= Tennessee Tech Golden Eagles men's basketball statistical leaders =

The Tennessee Tech Golden Eagles men's basketball statistical leaders are individual statistical leaders of the Tennessee Tech Golden Eagles men's basketball program in various categories, including points, assists, blocks, rebounds, and steals. Within those areas, the lists identify single-game, single-season, and career leaders. The Golden Eagles represent Tennessee Tech University in the NCAA Division I Southern Conference.

Tennessee Tech began competing in intercollegiate basketball in 1924. However, the school's record book does not generally list records from before the 1950s, as records from before this period are often incomplete and inconsistent. Since scoring was much lower in this era, and teams played much fewer games during a typical season, it is likely that few or no players from this era would appear on these lists anyway.

The NCAA did not officially record assists as a stat until the 1983–84 season, and blocks and steals until the 1985–86 season, but Tennessee Tech's record books includes players in these stats before these seasons. These lists are updated through the end of the 2020–21 season.

== Scoring ==
Career
| Rk | Player | Points | Seasons |
|---|---|---|---|
| 1 | Earl Wise | 2,196 | 1986–87 1987–88 1988–89 1989–90 |
| 2 | Kevin Murphy | 2,109 | 2008–09 2009–10 2010–11 2011–12 |
| 3 | Stephen Kite | 1,806 | 1982–83 1983–84 1984–85 1985–86 |
| 4 | John Best | 1,773 | 1989–90 1990–91 1991–92 1992–93 |
| 5 | Frank Jones | 1,733 | 1972–73 1973–74 1974–75 1975–76 |
| 6 | Jud Dillard | 1,732 | 2009–10 2010–11 2011–12 2012–13 |
| 7 | Anthony Fisher | 1,726 | 2004–05 2005–06 2006–07 2007–08 |
| 8 | Jr. Clay | 1,661 | 2018–19 2019–20 2020–21 2021–22 |
| 9 | Anthony Avery | 1,563 | 1985–86 1986–87 1987–88 1988–89 |
| 10 | Jimmy Hagan | 1,539 | 1957–58 1958–59 1959–60 |

Season
| Rk | Player | Points | Season |
|---|---|---|---|
| 1 | John Best | 799 | 1992–93 |
| 2 | Jimmy Hagan | 720 | 1958–59 |
| 3 | Kevin Murphy | 681 | 2011–12 |
| 4 | Earl Wise | 650 | 1988–89 |
| 5 | Rob West | 587 | 1993–94 |
| 6 | Frank Jones | 582 | 1974–75 |
| 7 | John Best | 580 | 1991–92 |
| 8 | Jud Dillard | 572 | 2011–12 |
| 9 | Belton Rivers | 570 | 2006–07 |
| | Willie Jenkins | 570 | 2004–05 |

Single game
| Rk | Player | Points | Season | Opponent |
|---|---|---|---|---|
| 1 | Kevin Murphy | 50 | 2011–12 | SIUE |
| 2 | Ron Filipek | 48 | 1965–66 | Middle Tennessee |
| | Jimmy Hagan | 48 | 1958–59 | East Tennessee State |
| 4 | Kenny Sidwell | 44 | 1955–56 | Morehead State |
| 5 | John Best | 42 | 1992–93 | Morehead State |
| 6 | Frank Jones | 41 | 1975–76 | East Tennessee State |
| | Jim Clemens | 41 | 1973–74 | William Penn |
| | Bobby Young | 41 | 1963–64 | Morehead State |
| 9 | Bobby Porter | 39 | 1976–77 | Cleveland State |
| 10 | John Best | 38 | 1992–93 | Murray State |
| | John Best | 38 | 1992–93 | Eastern Kentucky |
| | Dave Pratt | 38 | 1966–67 | Eastern Kentucky |

== Rebounds ==
Career
| Rk | Player | Rebounds | Seasons |
|---|---|---|---|
| 1 | Jimmy Hagan | 1,108 | 1957–58 1958–59 1959–60 |
| 2 | Lorenzo Coleman | 1,001 | 1993–94 1994–95 1995–96 1996–97 |
| 3 | Ron Filipek | 846 | 1964–65 1965–66 1966–67 |
| 4 | Earl Wise | 845 | 1986–87 1987–88 1988–89 1989–90 |
| 5 | Stephen Kite | 844 | 1982–83 1983–84 1984–85 1985–86 |
| 6 | Herbie Merritt | 834 | 1953–54 1954–55 1955–56 1956–57 1957–58 |
| 7 | Jud Dillard | 816 | 2009–10 2010–11 2011–12 2012–13 |
| 8 | Rich Stone | 774 | 1969–70 1971–72 1972–73 |
| 9 | Amadi McKenzie | 771 | 2004–05 2005–06 2006–07 2007–08 |
| 10 | Bobby Porter | 715 | 1974–75 1975–76 1976–77 1977–78 |

Season
| Rk | Player | Rebounds | Season |
|---|---|---|---|
| 1 | Jimmy Hagan | 454 | 1958–59 |
| 2 | Jimmy Hagan | 379 | 1959–60 |
| 3 | Lorenzo Coleman | 333 | 1996–97 |
| 4 | Henry Jordan | 327 | 1965–66 |
| 5 | Daniel Northern | 296 | 2007–08 |
| 6 | Ron Filipek | 290 | 1966–67 |
| 7 | Damien Kinloch | 288 | 2001–02 |
| 8 | Charles Jackson | 286 | 2014–15 |
| 9 | Jud Dillard | 282 | 2011–12 |
| | Ron Filipek | 282 | 1965–66 |

Single game
| Rk | Player | Rebounds | Season | Opponent |
|---|---|---|---|---|
| 1 | Jimmy Hagan | 30 | 1958–59 | Morehead State |
| 2 | Lorenzo Coleman | 22 | 1994–95 | Bethel College |
| 3 | Lorenzo Coleman | 21 | 1996–97 | UT Martin |
| 4 | Larrie Smith | 20 | 2000–01 | Southeast Missouri |
| | Lorenzo Coleman | 20 | 1996–97 | Middle Tennessee |
| | Charles Edmonson | 20 | 1991–92 | Tennessee State |
| | Harold Johnson | 20 | 1972–73 | Charlotte |
| | Ron Sutton | 20 | 1967–68 | Western Kentucky |
| | Ron Filipek | 20 | 1966–67 | Eastern Kentucky |
| | Ron Filipek | 20 | 1966–67 | Austin Peay |
| | Tom Kirby | 20 | 1966–67 | Arkansas State |
| | Ron Filipek | 20 | 1965–66 | Middle Tennessee |
| | Bobby Young | 20 | 1963–64 | East Tennessee St. |
| | John Adams | 20 | 1962–63 | Western Kentucky |

== Assists ==
Career
| Rk | Player | Assists | Seasons |
|---|---|---|---|
| 1 | Van Usher | 690 | 1989–90 1990–91 1991–92 |
| 2 | Anthony Avery | 593 | 1985–86 1986–87 1987–88 1988–89 |
| 3 | Carlton Clarington | 470 | 1981–82 1982–83 1983–84 1984–85 |
| 4 | Jr. Clay | 451 | 2018–19 2019–20 2020–21 2021–22 |
| 5 | Maurice Houston | 448 | 1990–91 1991–92 1992–93 1993–94 |
| 6 | Wayne Pack | 422 | 1970–71 1971–72 1972–73 |
| 7 | Zac Swansey | 404 | 2010–11 2011–12 |
| 8 | Keishawn Davidson | 385 | 2019–20 2020–21 2021–22 |
| 9 | Cameron Crisp | 367 | 2000–01 2001–02 2002–03 2003–04 |
| 10 | Jimmy Howell | 325 | 1975–76 1976–77 1977–78 1978–79 |

Season
| Rk | Player | Assists | Season |
|---|---|---|---|
| 1 | Van Usher | 254 | 1991–92 |
| 2 | Van Usher | 247 | 1990–91 |
| 3 | Zac Swansey | 212 | 2010–11 |
| 4 | Carlton Clarington | 210 | 1984–85 |
| 5 | Zac Swansey | 192 | 2011–12 |
| 6 | Van Usher | 189 | 1989–90 |
| 7 | Anthony Avery | 183 | 1988–89 |
| 8 | Maurice Houston | 170 | 1993–94 |
| 9 | Tony DiLeo | 167 | 1974–75 |
| 10 | Wayne Pack | 160 | 1970–71 |

Single game
| Rk | Player | Assists | Season | Opponent |
|---|---|---|---|---|
| 1 | Van Usher | 17 | 1990–91 | Western Kentucky |
| 2 | Wayne Pack | 16 | 1970–71 | Morehead State |
| 3 | Maurice Houston | 15 | 1992–93 | Morehead State |
| | Van Usher | 15 | 1991–92 | Austin Peay |
| | Van Usher | 15 | 1989–90 | Mississippi Valley St. |
| 6 | Zac Swansey | 14 | 2011–12 | SIUE |
| | Van Usher | 14 | 1990–91 | Western Carolina |
| | Tony DiLeo | 14 | 1974–75 | Stetson |

== Steals ==
Career
| Rk | Player | Steals | Seasons |
|---|---|---|---|
| 1 | Van Usher | 280 | 1989–90 1990–91 1991–92 |
| 2 | Stephen Kite | 213 | 1982–83 1983–84 1984–85 1985–86 |
| 3 | Anthony Avery | 202 | 1985–86 1986–87 1987–88 1988–89 |
| | Jr. Clay | 202 | 2018–19 2019–20 2020–21 2021–22 |
| 5 | Joey Westmoreland | 184 | 1998–99 1999–00 2000–01 2001–02 |
| 6 | Earl Wise | 155 | 1986–87 1987–88 1988–89 1989–90 |
| | Carlton Clarington | 155 | 1981–82 1982–83 1983–84 1984–85 |
| 8 | Keyon Boyd | 154 | 2002–03 2003–04 2004–05 2005–06 |
| 9 | Frank Davis | 147 | 2006–07 2007–08 2008–09 2009–10 |
| 10 | Zac Swansey | 140 | 2010–11 2011–12 |

Season
| Rk | Player | Steals | Season |
|---|---|---|---|
| 1 | Van Usher | 113 | 1990–91 |
| 2 | Van Usher | 86 | 1991–92 |
| 3 | Anthony Avery | 85 | 1988–89 |
| 4 | Van Usher | 80 | 1989–90 |
| 5 | Keyon Boyd | 73 | 2005–06 |
| 6 | Zac Swansey | 72 | 2011–12 |
| 7 | Alex Franco | 71 | 1997–98 |
| 8 | Zac Swansey | 68 | 2010–11 |
| 9 | Stephen Kite | 64 | 1985–86 |
| 10 | Joey Westmoreland | 60 | 2001–02 |

Single game
| Rk | Player | Steals | Season | Opponent |
|---|---|---|---|---|
| 1 | Curtis Phillips Jr. | 8 | 2017–18 | New Mexico |
| | Van Usher | 8 | 1990–91 | Bethel College |
| | Van Usher | 8 | 1990–91 | Covenant College |
| | Van Usher | 8 | 1989–90 | Vanderbilt |
| | Jimmy Howell | 8 | 1978–79 | Murray State |
| 6 | Zach Bailey | 7 | 2010–11 | Hiwassee College |
| | Van Usher | 7 | 1990–91 | Murray State |
| | Van Usher | 7 | 1989–90 | Sam Houston St. |
| | Van Usher | 7 | 1990–91 | Nebraska |
| | Van Usher | 7 | 1989–90 | Tennessee State |

== Blocks ==
Career
| Rk | Player | Blocks | Seasons |
|---|---|---|---|
| 1 | Lorenzo Coleman | 436 | 1993–94 1994–95 1995–96 1996–97 |
| 2 | Daniel Northern | 184 | 2006–07 2007–08 2008–09 |
| 3 | Miloš Babić | 115 | 1987–88 1988–89 1989–90 |
| 4 | Micaiah Henry | 114 | 2016–17 2017–18 2018–19 |
| 5 | Anthony Morse | 110 | 2012–13 2013–14 2014–15 2015–16 |
| 6 | Bassey Inameti | 98 | 2008–09 2009–10 2010–11 2011–12 |
| 7 | Jonathan Jones | 87 | 2003–04 2004–05 2005–06 2006–07 |
| | Eric Akins | 87 | 1996–97 1997–98 1998–99 1999–00 |
| 9 | Steve Taylor | 84 | 1981–82 1982–83 |
| 10 | Bobby Porter | 78 | 1974–75 1975–76 1976–77 1977–78 |

Season
| Rk | Player | Blocks | Season |
|---|---|---|---|
| 1 | Lorenzo Coleman | 134 | 1996–97 |
| 2 | Lorenzo Coleman | 123 | 1994–95 |
| 3 | Lorenzo Coleman | 94 | 1995–96 |
| 4 | Daniel Northern | 90 | 2007–08 |
| 5 | Lorenzo Coleman | 85 | 1993–94 |
| 6 | Daniel Northern | 75 | 2008–09 |
| 7 | Anthony Morse | 59 | 2015–16 |
| 8 | Miloš Babić | 58 | 1988–89 |
| 9 | Micaiah Henry | 55 | 2018–19 |
| 10 | Alex Franco | 52 | 1997–98 |

Single game
| Rk | Player | Blocks | Season | Opponent |
|---|---|---|---|---|
| 1 | Lorenzo Coleman | 10 | 1996–97 | Eastern Kentucky |
| | Lorenzo Coleman | 10 | 1995–96 | Lambuth College |
| | Lorenzo Coleman | 10 | 1994–95 | Oral Roberts |
| 4 | Lorenzo Coleman | 9 | 1996–97 | Cumberland |
| | Lorenzo Coleman | 9 | 1995–96 | Morehead State |
| | Lorenzo Coleman | 9 | 1994–95 | Northern Illinois |
| | Lorenzo Coleman | 9 | 1994–95 | UT Martin |
| 8 | Lorenzo Coleman | 8 | 1996–97 | Northwestern |
| | Lorenzo Coleman | 8 | 1994–95 | Middle Tennessee |
| | Lorenzo Coleman | 8 | 1994–95 | Austin Peay |
