= 2021 Polish Basketball Cup =

57th edition of Poland's national cup competition for men basketball teams

Polish Basketball Cup
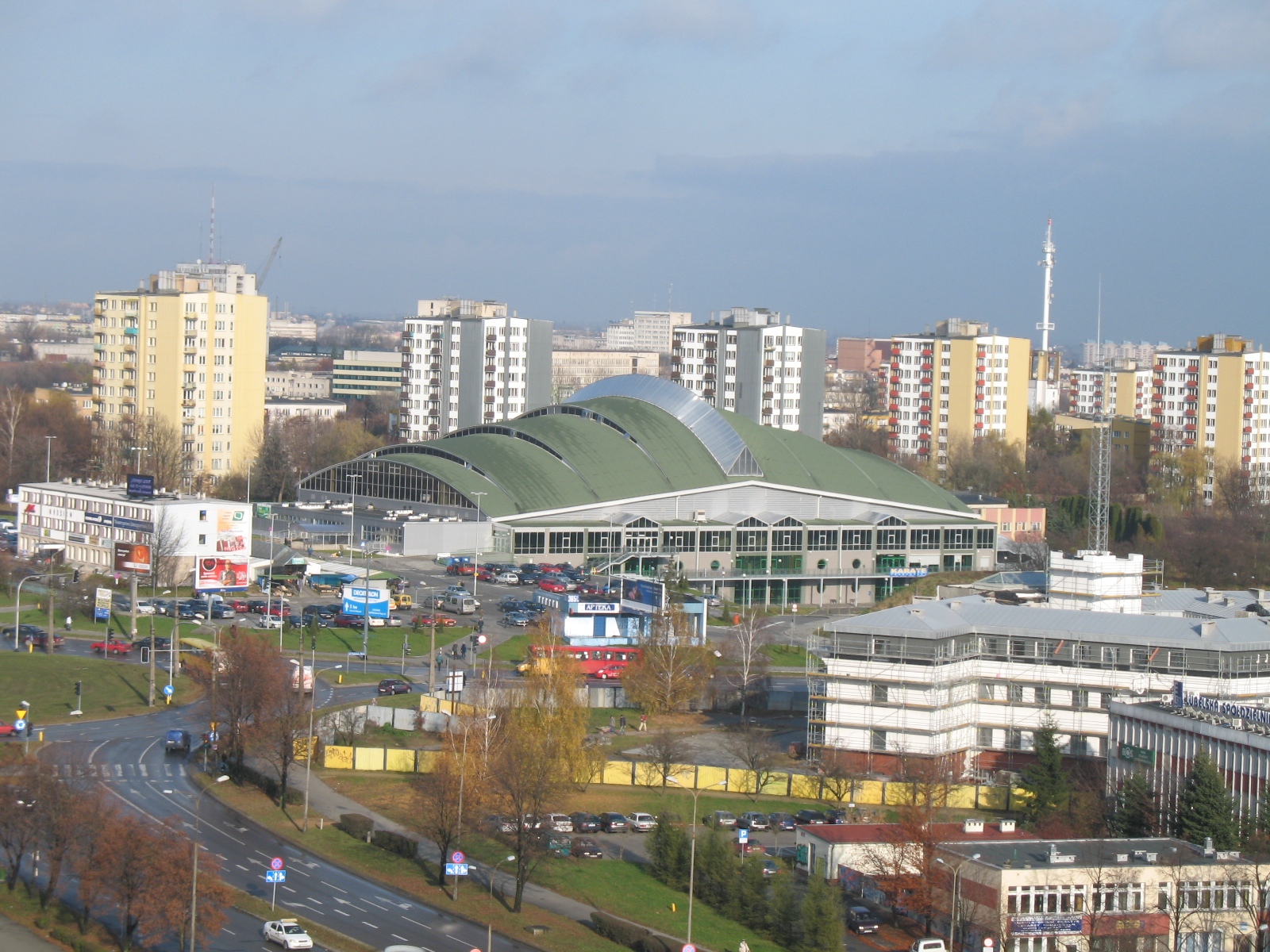
- The Globus hosted the tournament
- Season: 2021
- Duration: 11–14 February
- Games played: 7
- Teams: 8

Regular season
- Season MVP: (Denmark) Iffe Lundberg

Finals
- Champions: Zastal Zielona Góra (3rd title)
- Runners-up: Spójnia Stargard
- Semi-finalists: BM Slam Stal Ostrów Wielkopolski, Trefl Sopot

The 2021 Suzuki Polish Basketball Cup (Polish: Puchar Polski 2021) was the 58th edition of Poland's national cup competition for men's basketball teams. It was managed by the Polish Basketball League (PLK) and was held in Lublin, in the Globus. Zastal Zielona Góra won its third Cup title in club history.

== Qualified teams ==
The eight teams first qualified after the first half of the 2020–21 PLK season qualified to the tournament. The four highest-placed teams would play the lowest-seeded teams in the quarter-finals. Start Lublin qualified as host of the tournament, and gained automatic qualification.

== Bracket ==
Quarterfinals; 11–12 February
Zastal Zielona Góra	90
Asseco Arka Gdynia	68
TBV Start Lublin	73
BM Slam Stal Ostrów Wielkopolski	80
Legia Warsaw	56
Trefl Sopot	92
Śląsk Wrocław	73
Spójnia Stargard	92

Semifinals; 13 February
Zastal Zielona Góra	105
BM Slam Stal Ostrów Wielkopolski	79
Trefl Sopot	73
Spójnia Stargard	84

Final; 14 February
Zastal Zielona Góra	86
Spójnia Stargard	73

== Final ==
14 February 2021	Zastal Zielona Góra	86–73	Spójnia Stargard	Lublin
17:00 CET (UTC+01:00)	Scoring by quarter: 24–16, 24–15, 16–20, 22–22
Polsat Sport Extra	Pts: Lundberg 21; Rebs: Groselle 8 Asts: Lundberg 5 PIR: Lundberg 26	Report	Pts: Steele 16; Rebs: Steele 10; Asts: Threatt 7 PIR: Steele 22	Arena: Globus; Referees: Jakub Zamojski, Mariusz Nawrocki, Karol Nowak

Starters:			Pts	Reb	Ast
SG	0	(Romania) Kris Richard	15	4	2
PG	1	(Denmark) Gabriel Lundberg	21	6	5
SF	31	(Latvia) Jānis Bērziņš	6	5	4
PF	32	(United States) Blake Reynolds	2	4	0
C	41	(United States) Geoffrey Groselle	15	8	2
Reserves:					
F	2	(Poland) Kacper Porada	DNP		
PG	3	(Poland) Kacper Traczyk	DNP		
PG	7	(Poland) Mikołaj Siminski	DNP		
SG	10	(Poland) Nikodem Klocek	DNP		
PF	21	(Poland) Filip Put	0	0	0
F/C	24	(Latvia) Rolands Freimanis	20	5	1
PG	55	(Poland) Łukasz Koszarek	7	2	2
Head coach:
(Croatian Basketball Federation) Žan Tabak

Zastal Zielona Góra	Spójnia Stargard

Zastal Zielona Góra	Statistics	Spójnia Stargard
19/37 (51.4%)	2 point field goals	16/38 (42.1%)
12/28 (42.9%)	3 point field goals	10/26 (38.5%)
12/15 (80%)	Free throws	11/18 (61.1%)
14	Offensive rebounds	14
24	Defensive rebounds	20
38	Total rebounds	34
16	Assists	12
17	Steals	8
19	Turnovers	21
3	Blocks	3

Starters:			Pts	Reb	Ast
PG	2	(United States) Jay Threatt	13	1	7
G/F	7	(United States) Nick Faust	9	2	3
C	11	(United States) Baylee Steele	16	10	0
G/F	18	(United States) Raymond Cowels	14	4	0
F	31	(Poland) Mateusz Kostrzewski	8	3	0
Reserves:					
PG	1	(Poland) Piotr Potap	DNP		
SG	8	(Poland) Filip Matczak	6	1	1
PG	9	(Poland) Francis Han	0	0	1
F/C	24	(Democratic Republic of the Congo) Omari Gudul	5	2	0
PF	25	(Poland) Dominik Grudziński	DNP		
F	32	(Poland) Kacper Młynarski	2	4	0
F	38	(Poland) Bartosz Kucharczyk	DNP		
Head coach:
(Polish Basketball Federation) Marek Łukomski

== See also ==
- 2020–21 PLK season
