= Robert Hines =

Robert Hines or Bob Hines may refer to:

- Robert Hines (astronaut) (born 1975), American astronaut
- Robert Hines (boxer) (born 1961), American boxer
- Robert L. Hines (born 1970), American comedian and actor
- Robert W. Hines (1912–1994), American wildlife artist
- Bo Hines (born 1995), American politician

== See also ==
- Bob Heinz (born 1947), American football player
