= Chicago Vocational High School =

Location
- 2100 East 87th Street; Chicago, Illinois 60617; United States; 41.7381°N 87.5729°W

Information
- School type: Public; Secondary; Vocational
- Opened: 1941
- School district: Chicago Public Schools
- CEEB code: 140735
- Principal: Latasha M. Taylor
- Grades: 9–12
- Gender: Coed
- Enrollment: 587 (2024–2025)
- Campus type: Urban
- Colors: Navy Blue; Gold
- Athletics conference: Chicago Public League
- Team name: Cavaliers
- Accreditation: North Central Association of Colleges and Schools
- Newspaper: Trademaster
- Yearbook: Technician
- Website: chicagovocational.org

Chicago Vocational High School (also known as Chicago Vocational Career Academy, Chicago Vocational Career Academy High School and locally known as CVCA or CVS) is a public 4–year vocational high school located in the Avalon Park neighborhood on the south side of Chicago, Illinois, United States. Opened in 1941, the school is operated by the Chicago Public Schools district.

== History ==
Planning for the school began in 1936 with the need for a new vocational school on the South Side of the city. The school groundbreaking ceremony occurred in June 1938. Construction began in 1939, and was partially funded through the Works Progress Administration. With construction completed in April 1940, Chicago Vocational School opened with an all–male class of 850 in 1941. Enrollment was further restricted to students who had already completed a year of high school.

According to then Superintendent of Chicago Public Schools, Dr. William H. Johnson, the school's purpose was "the employ-ability of Chicago boys in the heavier trades and industries." The Chicago Daily Tribune noted that the new school was "regarded as the most modern and best equipped trade school in the United States." In June 1941, with entry into World War II imminent, the school was turned over to the United States Navy, where the school's emphasis would be on training aviation mechanics.

This change from general vocational education to specific wartime training had been something anticipated as a possible future of the school shortly before it had opened. Later, additional training for teachers and other civilians in national defense jobs was added. These defense related training courses permitted the Defense Priority Board to free up funds for purchasing more equipment for workshops, and to build a US$500,000 addition to the building. Construction also included a still–extant airplane hangar. During this time, non–vocational courses were moved to Calumet High School. By 1942, classes were being taught 24 hours a day to accommodate work and training schedules.

February 1946 saw the academic classes return from Calumet High School, and a return to the normalcy that the school had virtually never known, with the Navy officially "handing back the keys" to the school on April 30, 1946. 1946 also saw the admittance of the first women to the school. CVS started offering night courses to help returning veterans who held a day job. For times, classes were being offered 24 hours a day, seven days a week to accommodate the varied hours of returning veterans. The Navy had left behind an aircraft hangar, and a small number of relatively intact "war weary" combat aircraft, keeping aviation maintenance in the school's curriculum until 1995. This was highlighted in 1948 when students restored a Stinson Reliant monoplane to airworthy condition.

Rather than dismantle the plane and shipping it to an airport, the owner pilot received permission to wheel the plane onto nearby Anthony Avenue, and take off and fly it to Midway Airport; all in front of cameras for WGN-TV. the school was home to a Civil Air Patrol Cadet squadron but 1958 saw the activation of the school's ROTC program; the first to be started in a Chicago high school since 1946. The same article noted that the entire population of the school was 4,000, with the first ROTC class seeing an enrollment of 250.

== Academics ==
When the school first opened, it was not a diploma granting institution, with students earning certificates for industry. Aside from vocational education, students only took courses in English and United States History, Being a vocational and career academy, one of the core aspects of the school's curriculum is the Education-To-Careers (ETC) curriculum. Within this curriculum, students select a "major" from one of the "schools", such as the School of Construction and Manufacturing and the School of Transportation.

== Athletics ==
Chicago Vocational competes in interscholastic sports as a member of the Chicago Public League (CPL), and competes in state championship series sponsored by the Illinois High School Association (IHSA). The schools' sport teams are nicknamed Cavaliers. The school sponsors interscholastic athletic teams for men and women in basketball and volleyball. Men may compete in baseball, football, swimming & diving, and wrestling. Girls may compete in bowling, cross country, softball, and track & field. While not sponsored by the IHSA, CVS sponsors a boys softball team which competes exclusively in the CPL. Unlike the fast-pitch variety played by girls, the boys play the 16 inch variety of softball.

The boys' baseball team were public league champions four times (1952–53, 1975–76, 1979–80 and 1986–87) and Class AA twice (1979–80 and 1986–87). The boys' basketball team were Class AA twice (1975–76 and 2006–07) and regional champions four times (2006–07, 2008–09, 2014–15, and 2015–16). In 1988–89, The girls' bowling team were public league champions. The boys' cross country were Class AA four times from 1987 through 1991. The golf team were public league champions in 1951–52. In 1990–91, the boys' track and field team were public league champions and Class AA. The boys' wrestling team were public league champions in 1967–68. The school was the site of the weightlifting competition for the 1959 Pan American Games.

== Notable alumni ==
- Michael Baisden – 1981, is a notable author (The Maintenance Man, Men Cry in the Dark) and radio talk show host. He is currently host of a nationally syndicated self–titled radio show. In 2008, he received a Keepers of the Dream Award from the National Action Network.
- Yung Berg (Christian Ward) – (attended), is a rap artist (Sexy Lady).
- Darron Brittman – 1981, was the first officially recognized NCAA Division I men's basketball season steals leader in 1985–86.
- Dick Butkus – 1961, was an NFL linebacker for the Chicago Bears (1965–73). He was a two–time All-American at the University of Illinois, was an NFL first round draft pick in 1965, and was named to 8 All-Pro teams. He was voted to the Pro Football Hall of Fame in 1979, and into the College Football Hall of Fame in 1983. He was later named to the NFL 1960s All-Decade Team, NFL 1970s All-Decade Team, and the NFL 75th Anniversary All-Time Team. In 1985, he became the namesake of the Dick Butkus Award, given annually to the top collegiate linebacker.
- Lou Collier – (attended), is a former MLB player (Pittsburgh Pirates, Milwaukee Brewers, Montreal Expos, Boston Red Sox, Philadelphia Phillies).
- Marvin Freeman – 1981, was a Major League Baseball pitcher (1986–96). He was a member of the 1992 and 1993 Atlanta Braves who played in the World Series.
- Robert L. Hines – (attended), American comedian.
- DeMarlo Hale – 1979, is a former minor league baseball player and manager. Since 2006, he has been the third base coach for the Boston Red Sox, including their 2007 championship season which culminated with the 2007 World Series.
- Juwan Howard – 1991, was a professional basketball forward in the NBA (1994–2013). He was a member of the University of Michigan's Fab Five and won championships with the Miami Heat in 2012 and 2013. He then became a Heat assistant coach until 2019. Now he is the Head Coach of the Michigan Wolverines Basketball Team !
- Darryl Jones - Current bass player for Rolling Stones, Miles Davis, and Sting
- E. J. Jones – 1980, is a former NFL fullback.
- Bernie Mac (Bernard McCollough) – 1975, was a comedian and actor (The Original Kings of Comedy, Ocean's Eleven, Mr. 3000, The Bernie Mac Show). He was nominated for two Emmy Awards, two Golden Globe Awards, and won four NAACP Image Awards.
- Kel Mitchell - Actor/Comedian known for his roles in All That, Kenan & Kel and Good Burger.
- Minyon Moore – 1976, served as Director of White House Political Affairs and Director of the White House Office of Public Liaison under President Clinton.
- Dean Richards - Film critic and entertainment reporter for WGN-TV and a longtime radio host for WGN (AM) in Chicago.
- Strings (Marinna Teal) – 1994, rap artist (Tongue Song)
- Keena Turner – 1976, was an NFL linebacker who played his entire career (1980–90) for the San Francisco 49ers. He started, and was a member of the winning team in Super Bowl XVI, Super Bowl XIX, Super Bowl XXIII, and Super Bowl XXIV. He is currently Vice President of Football Affairs for the 49ers.
- Juice Williams – 2006, was the starting quarterback for the University of Illinois football team from 2006 to 2009.
- Chris Zorich – 1987, is a former NFL linebacker, playing most of his career (1991–97) for the Chicago Bears. Playing college football at the University of Notre Dame, he was a three–time All-American, and was inducted into the College Football Hall of Fame in 2007.
