= Filipek =

Filipek is a Polish language surname from the personal name Philipp. Notable people with the name include:

- Krzysztof Filipek (1961), Polish politician
- Ron Filipek (1944–2005), American basketball player
- Sofía Filipek (1994), Chilean field hockey player
- Katarzyna Filipek (1897–1944),Polish WWII Hero
