= John Best (basketball) =

American basketball player (born 1971)

Personal information
- Born: March 27, 1971 (age 55) Neptune, New Jersey, U.S.
- Listed height: 6 ft 8 in (2.03 m)
- Listed weight: 216 lb (98 kg)

Career information
- High school: Neptune (Neptune, New Jersey); Whitehaven (Memphis, Tennessee)
- College: Tennessee Tech (1989–1993)
- NBA draft: 1993: 2nd round, 36th overall pick
- Drafted by: New Jersey Nets
- Playing career: 1993–2007
- Position: Forward

Career history
- 1993–1994: Le Mans
- 1994: Westchester Stallions
- 1995: Piratas de Quebradillas
- 1995: San Miguel Beerman
- 1995–1996: Chorale Roanne
- 1996–1997: Fribourg Olympic
- 1997: Formula Shell
- 1997–1998: Angers BC 49
- 1998: Formula Shell
- 1998–1999: Fribourg Olympic
- 1999–2000: Formula Shell
- 2000–2003: Bayer Giants Leverkusen
- 2003–2004: Alba Berlin
- 2004–2007: Élan Chalon

Career highlights
- Basketball Bundesliga Top Scorer (2001); BBL All-Star Game MVP (2001); 2× BBL All-Star (2001, 2003); PBA All-Star (1998); Swiss Basketball League champion (1997); 2× First-team All-OVC (1992, 1993)
- Stats at Basketball Reference

John Herbert Best (born March 27, 1971) is an American former professional basketball player. A forward/center listed at 6-foot-8, he played college basketball at Tennessee Tech for 4 years, and in his senior year he ranked third in NCAA Division I in scoring with an average of 28.5 points per game. He was selected by the New Jersey Nets in the second round of the 1993 NBA draft (36th overall), but he was cut before the beginning of the 1993–94 NBA season and started his professional career in France. After playing in Puerto Rico, Switzerland and the Philippines, Best joined German team Bayer Giants Leverkusen where he was the Basketball Bundesliga Top Scorer in 2001 with an average of 22.9 points per game. He then participated in the 2003–04 Euroleague with Alba Berlin and retired after three more seasons in France with Élan Chalon.

== High school career ==
Best grew up in Neptune, New Jersey and then moved to Memphis, Tennessee with his family in 1987, before his junior year of high school. While being at Neptune High School he had not played in the varsity basketball team; he later had a 6 inches growth spurt and when at Whitehaven High School in Memphis he played two years in the varsity team. In his senior season at Whitehaven he averaged 21.1 points, 9.7 rebounds and 3.1 blocks per game.

== College career ==
Best signed for Tennessee Tech in April 1989. He wasn't cleared to play until November because his old high school in New Jersey had not given a final certification for a science course taken in the 9th grade: after the school provided the certification, Best became eligible. While at Tennessee Tech he chose to wear number 25 and he played mostly center during his college career. In his freshman season he played 15 games (no starts) and averaged 3.1 points, 1.7 rebounds and 0.1 assists per game, receiving limited playing time; he also won the Golden Eagle Award given by Tennessee Tech every year to players who showed "sacrifice, dedication and hard work": he received the award together with his teammate Mitch Cupples. After the graduation of forward Earl Wise, the 1989–90 top scorer at Tennessee Tech, coach Frank Harrell gave Best a spot in the starting lineup, and he led the team during his sophomore season, recording a team-best 13.9 points per game. In a preseason game on November 23, 1990, against Bethel he recorded a then career-high 32 points. Best went on to average 5.3 rebounds (second on the team behind Jerome Rodgers) and 0.9 steals (second behind Van Usher).

Best's junior season saw him start 27 out of 29 games, averaging 32 minutes per game and record a team-leading 20 points per game. His 7 rebounds per game placed him second behind Charles Edmondson, and he ranked third in steals behind Usher and Edmondson. At the end of the season he was an All-OVC selection, as he ranked third in the entire conference in scoring behind Division I scoring champion Brett Roberts and Popeye Jones. Best was named team capitain for his senior year. On December 12, 1992, in a game against Southern Mississippi he recorded a new career-high of 36 points; on January 9, 1993, against Eastern Kentucky he improved his career best with 38 points, and equalled it on January 30 against Murray State. He recorded his career-high of 42 points playing against Morehead State on February 22, 1993. He led the NCAA in 2-point field goals with 292, led the OVC in total points (799, also an all-time record for Tennessee Tech) and points per game (28.5), which also ranked him 3rd in the entire Division I and 2nd all-time in Tennessee Tech history behind Jimmy Hagan's 1958–59 season (28.8). At the end of the 1992–93 season he was named in the All-OVC team, NABC All-Region and All-District teams, and in the Basketball Weekly All-Region team.

He ranks 4th all-time for points scored at Tennessee Tech with 1,773 in 97 games.

In 2018, he was named an OVC basketball legend.

=== College statistics ===
Year	Team	GP	GS	MPG	FG%	3P%	FT%	RPG	APG	SPG	BPG	PPG
1989–90	Tennessee Tech	15	0	6.3	.429	.000	.708	1.7	0.1	0.3	0.0	3.1
1990–91	Tennessee Tech	25	25	22.1	.547	.111	.754	5.3	0.2	0.9	0.1	13.9
1991–92	Tennessee Tech	29	27	32.0	.568	.188	.710	7.0	1.0	1.2	0.4	20.0
1992–93	Tennessee Tech	28	28	36.0	.553	.222	.749	8.4	2.6	1.4	0.2	28.5
Career		97	80	26.6	.557	.186	.737	6.9	1.3	1.2	0.2	21.0

== Professional career ==
After the end of his senior season, Best was automatically eligible for the 1993 NBA draft, during which he was selected by the New Jersey Nets with the 9th pick in the second round (36th overall). He participated in the preseason camp with the Nets, but was cut before the beginning of the 1993–94 NBA season and moved to Europe, signing for French club Le Mans Sarthe. In 1993–94 he played 17 games in the LNB Pro A with Le Mans, averaging 18.2 points, 7.1 rebounds and 1.6 assists, shooting 51% from the field in 35.4 minutes per game. He played in the USBL in 1994 with the Westchester Stallions; in 1995 he moved to Piratas de Quebradillas in the Baloncesto Superior Nacional of Puerto Rico, where he appeared in 5 games averaging 20 points, 6 rebounds and 0.8 assists, and then played for the San Miguel Beerman of the Philippine Basketball Association. In 1995–96 he played with Chorale Roanne in the LNB Pro B, the second level of French basketball.

He joined Swiss club Fribourg Olympic, where he won the Swiss Basketball League title in 1996–97. After a stint for the Formula Shell Zoom in the Philippines he played in the LNB Pro B again in 1997–98 for Angers BC 49. He then spent two seasons with Formula Shell Zoom, earning an All-Star selection in 1998. In 2000 he transferred to German club Bayer Giants Leverkusen, in the Basketball Bundesliga. In the 2000–01 season he played a total of 32 games averaging 22.9 points, 6.1 rebounds, 2.6 assists and 1.9 steals in 32.8 minutes, shooting 58.1% from the field (38.7% from three) and 85% from the free throw line, and was the top scorer of the league; he was also named the BBL All-Star Game MVP in 2001. In 2001–02 he played 29 games with averages of 19.6 points, 5.8 rebounds, 2 assists and 1.8 steals in 31.2 minutes per game (shooting 38.9% from three). In 2002–03 over 30 games he averaged 20.6 points, 5.9 rebounds, 2.7 assists and 1.4 steals shooting 55.7% from the field (39.8% from three) and 85.3% from the line in 34.4 minutes per game. In 2003 he left Leverkusen for Alba Berlin: in 2003–04 he played 37 games in the Bundesliga (28 in the regular season, 9 in the playoffs) averaging 15.4 points, 4.4 rebounds, 1.2 assists and 1 steal on 58.4% shooting from the field (40.6% from three) and 90.5% on free throws, thus recording a 50–40–90 season. He also played in the 2003–04 Euroleague with Alba Berlin played, appearing in 14 games, averaging 11 points and 4.2 rebounds per game, shooting 55.4% from the field (38.9% from three) and 90.5% from the free throw line.

In 2004 he left Germany to go back to France, signing for Élan Chalon. In the 2004–05 LNB Pro A season Best played 33 games, with averages of 15.8 points, 4.3 rebounds and 1.4 assists, shooting 39.3% from three and 92.3% from the free throw line in 29.3 minutes per game. He also appeared in the 2004–05 ULEB Cup with Élan Chalon, and played 10 games, averaging 15.6 points and 4.3 rebounds, shooting 53.6% from the field (41% from three) and 88.9% from the line. In the 2005–06 season he appeared in 32 games averaging 12.4 points, 5.1 rebounds and 2.1 assists in 28.1 minutes per game, and he retired after the 2006–07 season during which he played 33 games with averages of 11.9 points, 3.8 rebounds and 1.8 assists in 25.1 minutes per game.
