= Fuquan Edwin =

American basketball player (born 1991)

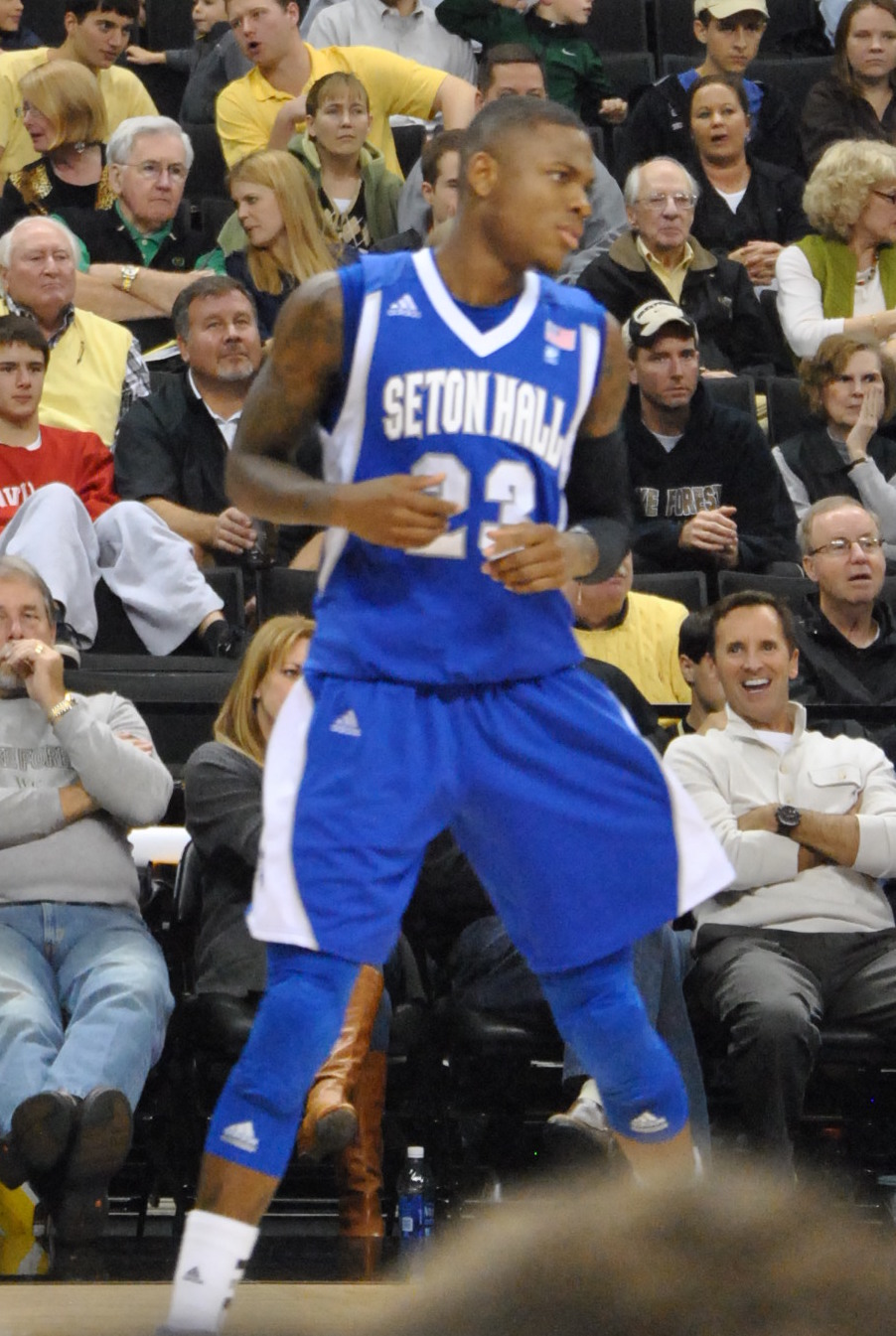
- Edwin with the Seton Hall Pirates in 2012

Personal information
- Born: September 17, 1991 (age 35) Paterson, New Jersey, U.S.
- Listed height: 6 ft 6 in (1.98 m)
- Listed weight: 207 lb (94 kg)

Career information
- High school: Paterson Catholic (Paterson, New Jersey)
- College: Seton Hall (2010–2014)
- NBA draft: 2014: undrafted
- Playing career: 2014–2018
- Position: Small forward

Career history
- 2014–2015: Sioux Falls Skyforce
- 2015: Guaros de Lara
- 2015–2016: Ironi Nes Ziona
- 2016–2017: Cairns Taipans
- 2017: Sigal Prishtina
- 2017: Kauhajoen Karhu
- 2017–2018: Raptors 905

Career highlights
- NBA D-League All-Defensive First Team (2015); NCAA steals leader (2012); Second-team All-Big East (2014); Big East Defensive Player of the Year (2014)
- Stats at Basketball Reference

Fuquan Edwin (born September 17, 1991) is an American former professional basketball player. He played college basketball for the Seton Hall Pirates, where in 2011–12, he tied with Jay Threatt for the highest steals per game average (3.0) in NCAA Division I competition.

== High school career ==
Edwin attended Paterson Catholic High School in Paterson, New Jersey where he led the team to three straight Passaic County Tournament championships and tallied 1,766 career points. As a junior in 2008–09, he averaged 16 points and eight rebounds per game. As a senior in 2009–10, he averaged a team-leading 15.7 points per game as he guided Paterson Catholic to a 28–1 record, and was named 2010 North Jersey Player of the Year and first-team All-State.

Edwin was ranked the #77 prospect in the Hoop Scoop Top-100, the #23 small forward by ESPN.com, and the #48 small forward by Scout.com.

== College career ==
As a freshman at Seton Hall in 2010–11, Edwin played in all 31 games and made 26 starts as he averaged 7.9 points and 3.3 rebounds per game. He shot 41.0% from the field, 31.6% from three, and 64.8% from the free throw line.

As a sophomore in 2011–12, Edwin played in all 34 games and made 33 starts as he became the first player in Big East history to lead the nation in steals per game (3.0). He broke Seton Hall's single-season record for steals with 102, and averaged a team third-best 12.5 points and a second-best 6.2 rebounds per game.

As a junior in 2012–13, Edwin started all 33 games and averaged a team-best 16.5 points per game, eighth highest scoring average in the Big East. He was named an All-Big East Honorable Mention and received first-team All-Metropolitan honors after becoming the 40th player in Seton Hall history to record 1,000 career points, only the 23rd player in program history to do it in less than three full seasons. He also finished second in the Big East with 2.4 steals per game and ranked fifth in the Big East with a 41.2% three-point shooting percentage.

As a senior in 2013–14, Edwin became just the second Pirate to be named Big East Defensive Player of the Year, joining Jerry Walker who won it in 1993. He also earned second-team All-Big East honors and led the Big East in steals for the second time in three seasons after finishing as runner-up to Michael Carter-Williams as a junior. Edwin finished his career owning three of the top-10 single season steals totals in program history, including a school record 102 in 2011–12. In 29 games (26 starts), he averaged 14.5 points, 3.5 rebounds, 1.7 assists and 2.7 steals in 30.1 minutes per game.

== Professional career ==
After going undrafted in the 2014 NBA draft, Edwin joined the Oklahoma City Thunder for the 2014 NBA Summer League, where he averaged 1.3 points in three games. On July 19, 2014, he signed with Giorgio Tesi Pistoia of Italy for the 2014–15 season. However, after being ruled out for two months with a foot injury on September 1, he was released by the club four days later before appearing in a game for them.

On October 24, 2014, Edwin signed with the San Antonio Spurs, but was waived the next day, prior to the start of the 2014–15 NBA season. On November 1, 2014, he was selected by the Sioux Falls Skyforce with the 15th overall pick in the 2014 NBA Development League Draft. On April 25, 2015, following the conclusion of the 2014–15 NBA Development League season, he signed with Guaros de Lara of Venezuela for the rest of the 2015 LNB season.

After playing for the New Orleans Pelicans during the 2015 NBA Summer League, Edwin signed a one-year deal with Ironi Nes Ziona of the Israeli Premier League on July 18, 2015.

On August 16, 2016, Edwin signed with the Cairns Taipans for the 2016–17 NBL season. On January 19, 2017, the Taipans agreed to release Edwin from his contract for personal reasons. In 20 games for the Taipans, he averaged 8.1 points, 3.5 rebounds and 1.0 assists per game. On January 31, 2017, he signed with Sigal Prishtina of the Kosovo Basketball Superleague.

On July 27, 2017, Edwin signed with Kauhajoen Karhu of the Korisliiga. He left Karhu after appearing in five games. On December 11, 2017, he was acquired by the Raptors 905 of the NBA G League.

== See also ==
- List of NCAA Division I men's basketball season steals leaders
