= Toby Jones (disambiguation) =

Toby Jones (born 1966) is an English actor.

Toby Jones may also refer to:

- Toby Jones (novel series), an Australian cricket fantasy novel series, written by Michael Panckridge and Brett Lee
- Theobald Jones (1790–1868), also known as Toby Jones, Irish officer in the Royal Navy, MP for County Londonderry, and lichenologist
- Toby Craig Jones, historian
- An internet character portrayed by Robert L. Hines

== See also ==
- Tobias Jones (disambiguation)
