= List of NCAA Division I men's basketball players with 11 or more steals in a game =

In basketball, a steal is the act of legally gaining possession of the ball by a defensive player who causes the opponent to turn the ball over. The steal statistic was first compiled by the National Collegiate Athletic Association (NCAA) during the 1985–86 season. All of the players on this list have recorded 11 or more steals in a single game in NCAA Division I competition.

The all-time single game steals record holder is Daron "Mookie" Blaylock of Oklahoma, who twice recorded 13 steals. The first instance occurred on December 12, 1987 against Centenary, while the second instance happened nearly one year later to the day on December 17, 1988 against Loyola Marymount. Blaylock and Darron Brittman of Chicago State are the only two Division I players who have recorded at least 11 steals on two occasions. Chris Thomas of Notre Dame, meanwhile, is the only freshman to achieve the feat.

== Key ==
Pos.	G	F	C	Ref.
Position	Guard	Forward	Center	Reference(s)

Class (Cl.) key
Fr	Freshman	So	Sophomore	Jr	Junior	Sr	Senior

*	Elected to the Naismith Memorial Basketball Hall of Fame
Player (X)	Denotes the number of times the player appears on the list
Team (X)	Denotes the number of times a player from that team appears on the list

== Dates of 11+ steals ==
Steals	Player	Pos.	Cl.	Team	Opponent	Date	Ref.
13	Mookie Blaylock	G	Jr	Oklahoma	Centenary	December 12, 1987	
13	Mookie Blaylock (2)	G	Sr	Oklahoma (2)	Loyola Marymount	December 17, 1988	
12	Greedy Daniels	G	Jr	TCU	Arkansas–Pine Bluff	December 30, 2000	
12	Richard Duncan	G		Middle Tennessee	Eastern Kentucky	February 20, 1999	
12	Terry Evans	G		Oklahoma (3)	Florida A&M	January 27, 1993	
12	Carldell Johnson	G	Sr	UAB	South Carolina State	November 27, 2005	
12	Jehiel Lewis	G/F	Sr	Navy	Bucknell	January 12, 2002	
12	Kenny Robertson	G	Jr	Cleveland State	Wagner	December 3, 1988	
11	Ron Arnold	G	Sr	St. Francis (NY)	Mount St. Mary's	February 4, 1993	
11	Darron Brittman	G	Sr	Chicago State	McKendree	January 24, 1986	
11	Darron Brittman (2)	G	Sr	Chicago State (2)	Saint Xavier	February 8, 1986	
11	Travis Demanby	G	Sr	Fresno State	Oklahoma State	February 10, 2002	
11	Tyus Edney	G	Sr	UCLA	George Mason	December 22, 1994	
11	Travis Holmes	G	So	VMI	Bridgewater (VA)	January 18, 2007	
11	Philip Huyler	G	Sr	Florida Atlantic	Campbell	January 18, 1997	
11	Ellis Jefferson	G	Jr	Lamar	Northwestern State	December 21, 2019	
11	Marty Johnson	G		Towson	Bucknell	February 17, 1988	
11	John Linehan	G	Sr	Providence	Rutgers	January 2, 2002	
11	Mark Macon	G	Jr	Temple	Notre Dame	January 29, 1989	
11	Drew Schifino	G	Jr	West Virginia	Arkansas–Monticello	December 1, 2001	
11	Carl Thomas	G	Sr	Eastern Michigan	Chicago State	February 20, 1991	
11	Chris Thomas	G	Fr	Notre Dame	New Hampshire	November 16, 2001	
11	Ali Ton	G	Jr	Davidson	Tufts	November 29, 1997	
11	Aldwin Ware	G	Sr	Florida A&M	Tuskegee	February 24, 1988	

== See also ==
- List of National Basketball Association players with most steals in a game
