= Darron Brittman =

American basketball player (born 1962)

Personal information
- Born: September 3, 1962 (age 64) Chicago, Illinois, U.S.
- Listed height: 5 ft 10 in (1.78 m)
- Listed weight: 170 lb (77 kg)

Career information
- High school: Chicago Vocational (Chicago, Illinois)
- College: Wisconsin–Parkside (1981–1982); Chicago State (1983–1986)
- NBA draft: 1986: undrafted
- Position: Point guard

Career history
- 1989–1990: Columbus Horizon

Career highlights
- NCAA steals leader (1986)

Darron Brittman (born September 3, 1962) is an American former basketball player who is best known as the first officially recognized NCAA Division I season steals leader in 1985–86. He is also one of only two Division I players ever to record 11 or more steals in two separate games. The first occurrence was on January 24, 1986 against McKendree University, and the second time happened two weeks later on February 8 against Saint Xavier University. Brittman recorded 11 steals in each game.

Brittman grew up in Chicago, Illinois and attended Chicago Vocational Career Academy. When he played college basketball for Chicago State University, the school was not classified as Division I until his senior year in 1985–86, so even though he led the nation in steals per game as a junior, the statistic is not recognized as a Division I accomplishment. Brittman was a 5 ft 10 in (1.78 m) point guard, and it was his small stature that ultimately cost him a chance to play in the NBA despite high acclaim from his coaches, NBA scouts and other NBA players. He was cut from the Milwaukee Bucks' training camp in 1986 because he was playing behind highly touted point guard Scott Skiles. Brittman was even nicknamed "Ali Baba" due to his crafty ability to steal the ball from opposing players.

With the NBA out of the picture, Brittman spent very short stints in the Continental Basketball Association (CBA) and World Basketball League, but neither panned out and he returned to Chicago to try to live a post-basketball life, which he admitted he found difficult to do.

== See also ==
- List of NCAA Division I men's basketball players with 11 or more steals in a game
- List of NCAA Division I men's basketball season steals leaders
