= Joel Hoover =

American basketball player

Personal information
- Born: Brooklyn, New York, U.S.
- Listed height: 6 ft 0 in (1.83 m)
- Listed weight: 175 lb (79 kg)

Career information
- High school: Grady (Brooklyn, New York)
- College: Maryland Eastern Shore (1996–1999)
- NBA draft: 2000: undrafted
- Position: Point guard

Career highlights
- NCAA steals leader (1997); MEAC First-team All-Rookie (1997)

Joel Hoover is an American former basketball player who played for Maryland Eastern Shore from 1996 to 1999. In 1996–97, he led the NCAA Division I in steals with a 3.21 per game average. He was a freshman when he led the country in steals.

== See also ==
- List of NCAA Division I men's basketball season steals leaders
