= List of NCAA Division I men's basketball season steals leaders =

In basketball, a steal is the act of legally gaining possession of the ball by a defensive player who causes the opponent to turn the ball over. The National Collegiate Athletic Association's (NCAA) Division I steal title is awarded to the player with the highest steals per game average in a given season. The steal title was first recognized in the 1985–86 season when statistics on steals were first compiled by the NCAA.

Desmond Cambridge of Alabama A&M holds the all-time NCAA Division I records for single-season steals (160) and steals per game (5.52), which both occurred during the 2001–02 season. The all-time leader in career steals is Richmond's Jacob Gilyard (466), who benefited from the NCAA's blanket COVID-19 eligibility waiver which allowed all student-athletes who were active in 2020–21 to play a full additional season without penalty.

In 2011–12, two 'firsts' occurred: Jay Threatt of Delaware State became the first ever repeat season steals leader, and there was also a tie for the honor (Fuquan Edwin of Seton Hall tied Threatt with a 3.00 steals per game average). When Chavis Holmes of Virginia Military Institute (VMI) secured his national steals title in 2008–09 at 3.39 spg, he and his brother Travis became the first pair of siblings in NCAA basketball history to lead the nation in the same statistical category. Travis had led the country with a 3.36 spg average in 2006–07. Only two schools have had two different players win the steals title: Alabama A&M (2002, 2005) and VMI (2007, 2009). The lowest steals total for a national per game leader is 78, and the lowest steals per game average to win is 2.83, both of which were achieved by Threatt.

Three freshmen have led the nation in steals: Jason Kidd (1993), Joel Hoover (1997), and Devin Gibson (2008). Among them, Kidd tallied the highest steals per game average (3.79) and the most total steals (110). He would also go on to lead the NCAA in assists the following season as a sophomore.

== Key ==
Pos.	G	F	C	SPG	Ref.
Position	Guard	Forward	Center	Steals per game	References

Class (Cl.) key
Fr	Freshman	So	Sophomore	Jr	Junior	Sr	Senior	Gr	Graduate

^	Player still active in NCAA Division I
†	Denotes a tie for the season's steals leader
*	Elected to the Naismith Memorial Basketball Hall of Fame
Player (X)	Denotes the number of times the player had been the steals leader up to and including that season

== Steals leaders ==
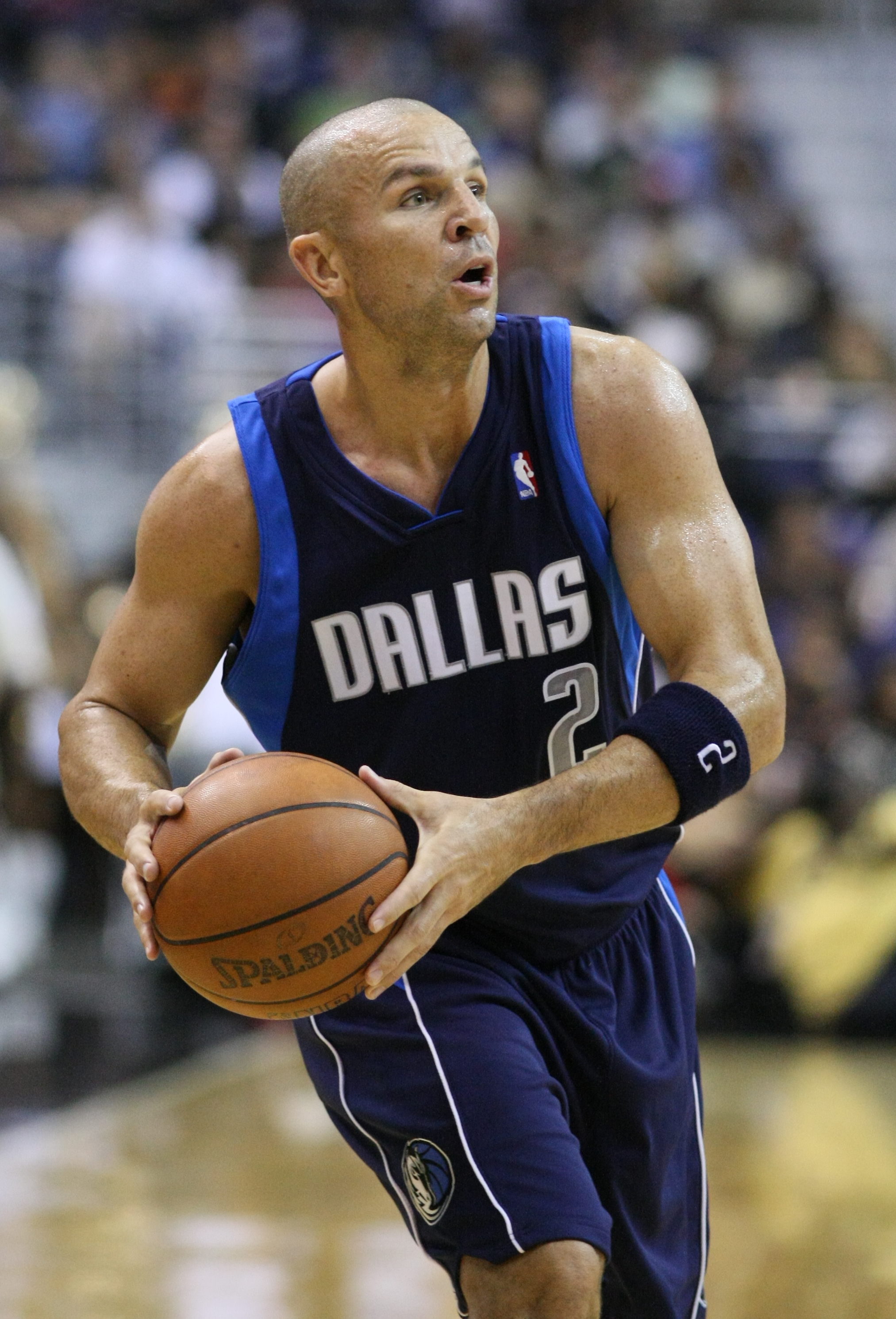
Jason Kidd led the nation in steals as a freshman in 1993.

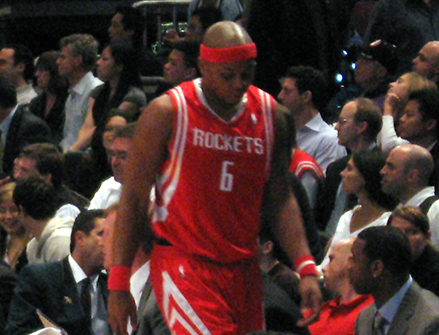
Bonzi Wells is the only steals champion from Ball State. He led the NCAA in 1997–98.

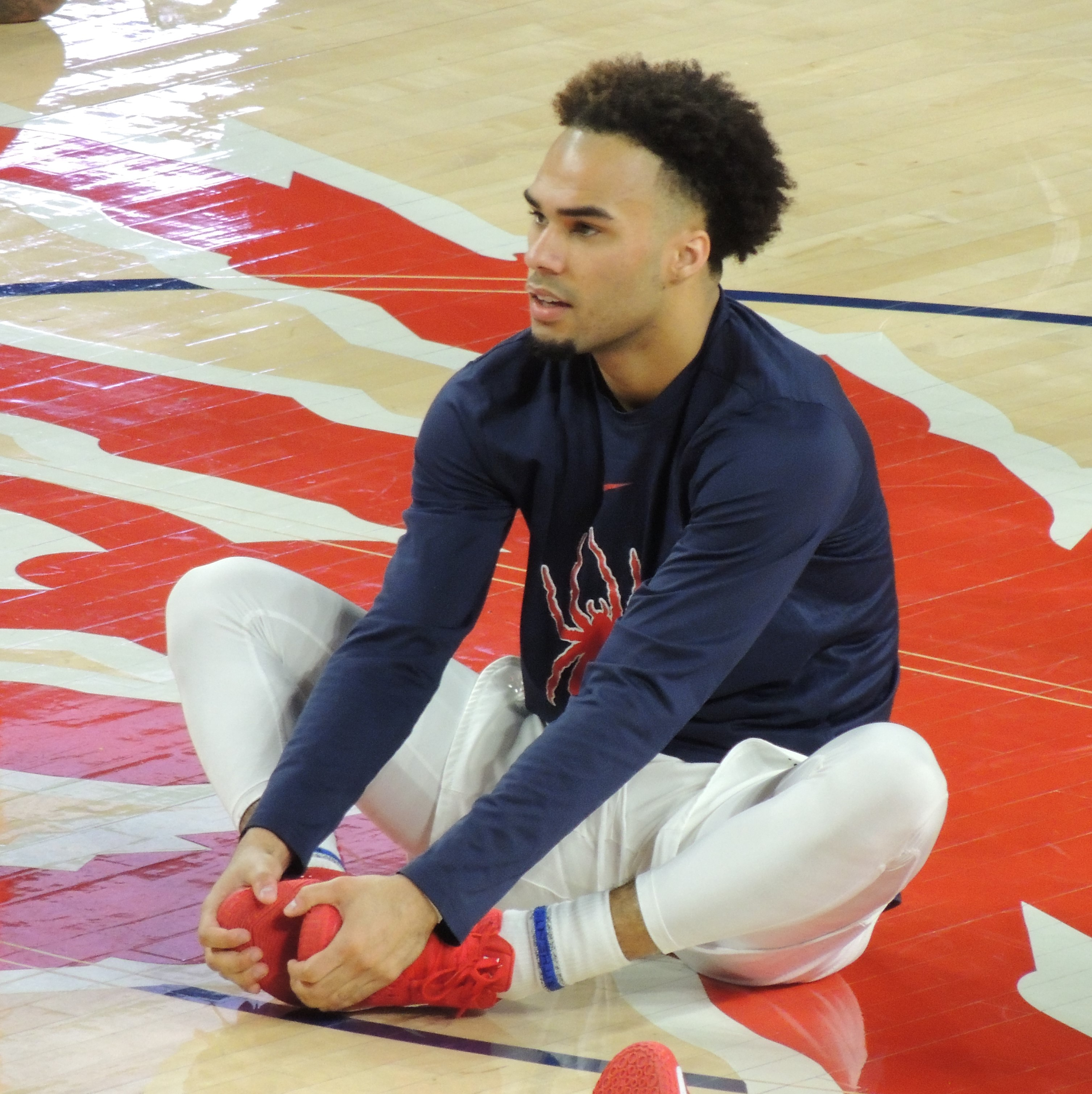
Jacob Gilyard led the nation in steals twice (2020, 2021).

Season	Player	Pos.	Cl.	Team	Games played	Steals	SPG	Ref.
1985–86	Darron Brittman	G	Sr	Chicago State	28	139	4.96	
1986–87	Tony Fairley	G	Sr	Charleston Southern	28	114	4.07	
1987–88	Aldwin Ware	G	Sr	Florida A&M	29	142	4.90	
1988–89	Kenny Robertson	G	Jr	Cleveland State	28	111	3.96	
1989–90	Ronn McMahon	G	Sr	Eastern Washington	29	130	4.48	
1990–91	Van Usher	G	Jr	Tennessee Tech	28	104	3.71	
1991–92	Victor Snipes	G	So	Northeastern Illinois	25	86	3.44	
1992–93	Jason Kidd*	G	Fr	California	29	110	3.79	
1993–94	Shawn Griggs	G	Sr	Southwestern Louisiana	30	120	4.00	
1994–95	Roderick Anderson	G	Sr	Texas	30	101	3.37	
1995–96	Pointer Williams	G	Sr	McNeese State	27	118	4.37	
1996–97	Joel Hoover	G	Fr	Maryland–Eastern Shore	28	90	3.21	
1997–98	Bonzi Wells	G/F	Sr	Ball State	29	103	3.55	
1998–99	Shawnta Rogers	G	Sr	George Washington	29	103	3.55	
1999–00	Carl Williams	G	Sr	Liberty	28	107	3.82	
2000–01	Greedy Daniels	G	Jr	TCU	25	108	4.32	
2001–02	Desmond Cambridge	G	Sr	Alabama A&M	29	160	5.52	
2002–03	Alexis McMillan	G	Sr	Stetson	22	87	3.95	
2003–04	Marques Green	G	Sr	St. Bonaventure	27	107	3.96	
2004–05	Obie Trotter	G	Jr	Alabama A&M	32	125	3.91	
2005–06	Tim Smith	G	Sr	East Tennessee State	28	95	3.39	
2006–07	Travis Holmes	G	So	VMI	33	111	3.36	
2007–08	Devin Gibson	G	Fr	UTSA	28	93	3.32	
2008–09	Chavis Holmes	G	Sr	VMI	31	105	3.39	
2009–10	Jay Threatt	G	So	Delaware State	29	82	2.83	
2010–11	Anthony Nelson	G	Sr	Niagara	29	98	3.38	
2011–12^{†}	Fuquan Edwin	G/F	So	Seton Hall	34	102	3.00	
2011–12^{†}	Jay Threatt (2)	G	Sr	Delaware State	26	78	3.00	
2012–13	Duke Mondy	G	Jr	Oakland	33	100	3.03	
2013–14	Brianté Weber	G	Jr	VCU	35	121	3.46	
2014–15	Corey Walden	G	Sr	Eastern Kentucky	32	99	3.09	
2015–16	Tra-Deon Hollins	G	Jr	Omaha	32	127	3.97	
2016–17	Ehab Amin	G	Jr	Texas A&M–Corpus Christi	36	124	3.44	
2017–18	Joseph Chartouny	G	Jr	Fordham	29	97	3.34	
2018–19	Matisse Thybulle	G	Sr	Washington	36	126	3.50	
2019–20	Jacob Gilyard	G	Jr	Richmond	31	98	3.16	
2020–21	Jacob Gilyard (2)	G	Sr	Richmond	23	82	3.57	
2021–22	Nendah Tarke	G	So	Coppin State	32	94	2.94	
2022–23	Kellen Tynes	G	Jr	Maine	30	98	3.27	
2023–24	Arturo Dean^	G	So	FIU	31	104	3.35	
2024–25	Kellen Tynes (2)	G	Gr	Maine	34	107	3.15	
2025–26	Javontae Campbell	G	Sr	Bowling Green	32	97	3.03	

== Multiple-time leaders ==
Rank	Player	Team	Times leader	Years
1	Jacob Gilyard	Richmond	2	2019–20, 2020–21
1	Jay Threatt	Delaware State	2	2009–10, 2011–12
1	Kellen Tynes	Maine	2	2022–23, 2024–25
