= Tobias Jones =

Tobias Jones may refer to:

- Tobias Jones (writer), author of The Dark Heart of Italy
- Tobias Jones, a character in the Driver video game franchise

== See also ==
- Toby Jones (disambiguation)
