= Geoffrey Groselle =

American basketball player (born 1993)

Utah State Aggies
- Position: Center

Personal information
- Born: February 12, 1993 (age 33) Dallas, Texas
- Listed height: 2.13 m (7 ft 0 in)
- Listed weight: 109 kg (240 lb)

Career information
- High school: Plano West (Plano, Texas)
- College: Creighton (2012–2016)
- NBA draft: 2016: undrafted
- Playing career: 2016–2025
- Coaching career: 2026–present

Career history

Playing
- 2016–2017: Löwen Braunschweig
- 2017–2018: Eisbären Bremerhaven
- 2018–2019: BC Astana
- 2019–2020: Orléans
- 2020–2021: Zastal Zielona Góra
- 2021–2022: Fortitudo Bologna
- 2022–2023: Legia Warsaw
- 2023–2024: Zastal Zielona Góra
- 2024–2025: Trefl Sopot

Coaching
- 2026–present: Utah State (assistant)

Career highlights
- PLK champion (2024); PLK MVP (2021); All-PLK Team (2021); All-VTB United League Second Team (2021); Polish Cup champion (2021); Kazakhstan League champion (2019)
Medals
Representing the United States
Pan American Games
Bronze medal – third place	2019 Lima	National team

Geoffrey Groselle (born February 12, 1993) is a US-born, naturalized Polish professional basketball player who last played for Trefl Sopot of the Polish Basketball League (PLK). A left-handed center, he played high school basketball at Plano West Senior High School, and four seasons in the NCAA Division I with the Creighton Bluejays. After going undrafted in the 2016 NBA draft, Groselle started a professional career in Europe with German team Löwen Braunschweig of the Basketball Bundesliga. In 2019 he won the bronze medal at the 2019 Pan American Games.

== High school career ==
Groselle attended Plano West Senior High School in Plano, Texas, where he played alongside his older brother Mike, who graduated in 2009. In his sophomore year of high school, he was named Newcomer of the Year in his district. As a senior, he averaged 12.4 points, 8.7 rebounds and 2.1 blocks, being named in the All-District and All-Area first teams. He was a first-team all-conference selection in his last two years at Plano West, and established school records for blocks and rebounds in a single season. He was ranked the 32nd best center in the nation in the class of 2011 by ESPN.

== College career ==
Groselle signed to play for Creighton on November 11, 2010. He decided to redshirt his freshman year, and spent the 2011–12 season practicing with the team.

Groselle made his debut in the 2012–13 season: he received limited playing time, and recorded season highs of 4 points and 4 rebounds in the November 20 game against Longwood. Groselle also appeared in one game during the 2013 NCAA tournament, playing one minute against Duke on March 24. In 17 games, Groselle averaged 0.5 points, 0.7 rebounds and 0.1 assists per game in 2.8 minutes of playing time.

In his sophomore season, Groselle played 15 games, again receiving limited minutes. He posted season highs of 8 points and 4 rebounds in the January 14 game against Butler, having made 4 of his 5 field goal attempts. In the 2014 NCAA tournament, Groselle played 3 minutes during the March 23 game against Baylor, scoring 3 points. He averaged 1.5 points, 0.9 rebounds, 0.1 assists and 0.3 blocks over 3.3 minutes per game of playing time.

Groselle was more involved in the team's rotation during his junior season. He posted a new career high of 15 points on November 25, 2014, against Eastern Illinois, shooting 7/8 from the field in 12 minutes. He started his first game on January 3, 2015, against Georgetown, and scored 2 points in 14 minutes. On February 4 he tied his career high in points with 15 and recorded a new career high in rebounds with 7 against Xavier. He improved the rebounding mark against Seton Hall on February 28, grabbing 8 rebounds. Groselle started 9 of his 31 games in his junior season, averaging 5.4 points, 2.5 rebounds and 0.6 blocks in 12.3 minutes per game.

As a senior, Groselle was chosen as the starting center, and recorded 34 starts out of 35 appearances. He recorded a new career high of 20 points against UMass on November 25, 2015, and posted his first double-double with 15 points and 12 rebounds against Loyola (Illinois) on December 5. On December 21, Groselle scored 27 points against North Texas, shooting 8/9 from the field and 11/14 from the free throw line. He posted double-doubles against DePaul (February 6), St. John's (February 28) and Alabama (March 15, his NIT debut). He scored 22 points on his last game with the team against BYU on March 22. He averaged 11.2 points, 6.1 rebounds, 0.4 assists and 1.3 blocks per game in 21.2 minutes in his senior season.

During his five years at Creighton, Groselle received several academic honors, being included in the Dean's List and in All-Academic teams both in the MVC and the Big East. In his four seasons with the Bluejays, Groselle did not attempt a single three-pointer, being exclusively employed as a center playing in the post.

== Professional career ==
After his senior season with the Creighton Bluejays, Groselle was automatically eligible for the 2016 NBA draft, where he was not selected by any team. Groselle signed a two-year contract with Löwen Braunschweig of the Basketball Bundesliga in Germany on July 1, 2016. In his first season as a professional player he played all 32 games, averaging 10.9 points, 6.2 rebounds, 0.8 assists and 1.2 blocks per game in 22.6 minutes: the team narrowly avoided relegation, finishing 16th out of 18 teams.

On July 25, 2017, Groselle signed with Eisbären Bremerhaven, another team of the Bundesliga. In the 2017–18 Basketball Bundesliga Groselle played all 34 games, posting averages of 11 points, 5.5 rebounds, 1.3 assists and 0.8 blocks in 21.9 minutes per game. Again his team avoided relegation for 2 points, finishing 16th over 18 teams.

In August 2018 Groselle signed with BC Astana of the VTB United League and the Kazakhstan Basketball Championship. He appeared in 16 games in the domestic league, posting averages of 14.1 points, 7.1 rebounds and 1.4 assists, and won the league title. In the 2018–19 VTB United League, Groselle played 26 games and averaged 12.1 points, 5.7 rebounds, 1.5 assists and 0.9 blocks per game over 26.6 minutes of playing time: Astana qualified for the playoffs, during which Groselle played all 3 games with averages of 11.7 points, 6.7 rebounds and 2.7 assists per game. The team lost the series against BC Khimki, 3–0.

In August 2019 Groselle signed with Orléans Loiret Basket, a team of the French LNB Pro A. He played 25 games with his new club, averaging 7.4 points, 5 rebounds and 0.6 assists in 19.2 minutes. On June 25, 2020, Groselle left Orléans and signed with Polish team Stelmet Zielona Góra.

On July 21, 2021, he signed with Fortitudo Bologna of the Italian Lega Basket Serie A (LBA) and FIBA Basketball Champions League (BCL). Groselle averaged 7.4 points and 4.6 rebounds per game. On February 14, 2022, he reportedly signed with s.Oliver Wuerzburg of the German easycredit BBL for the remainder of the season. However, Fortitudo Bologna refused to release Groselle, and s.Oliver Wuerzburg considered legal action against his agent.

In 2022, he left Fortitudo Bologna and joined Polish team, Legia Warsaw.

On August 23, 2023, he signed with Zastal Zielona Góra of the Polish Basketball League for a second stint.

On January 10, 2024, he signed with Trefl Sopot of the Polish Basketball League (PLK).

== National team career ==
Groselle was called up by Ed Cooley to be part of the United States team at the 2019 Pan American Games in Lima, Peru. He was the oldest member of the team at 26 years of age, and one of two professional players on the team together with Tyler Wideman: the rest of the roster was made of college players. Groselle posted 18 points and 10 rebounds in the bronze medal game against the Dominican Republic.

== Personal life ==
He was born in Dallas, Texas, son of Robert and Toni Groselle, and has two brothers and one sister. His older brother Michael played with him at Plano West, and was also a Division I player, spending four seasons at The Citadel between 2009 and 2013.
