= Omari Gudul =

Congolese basketball player

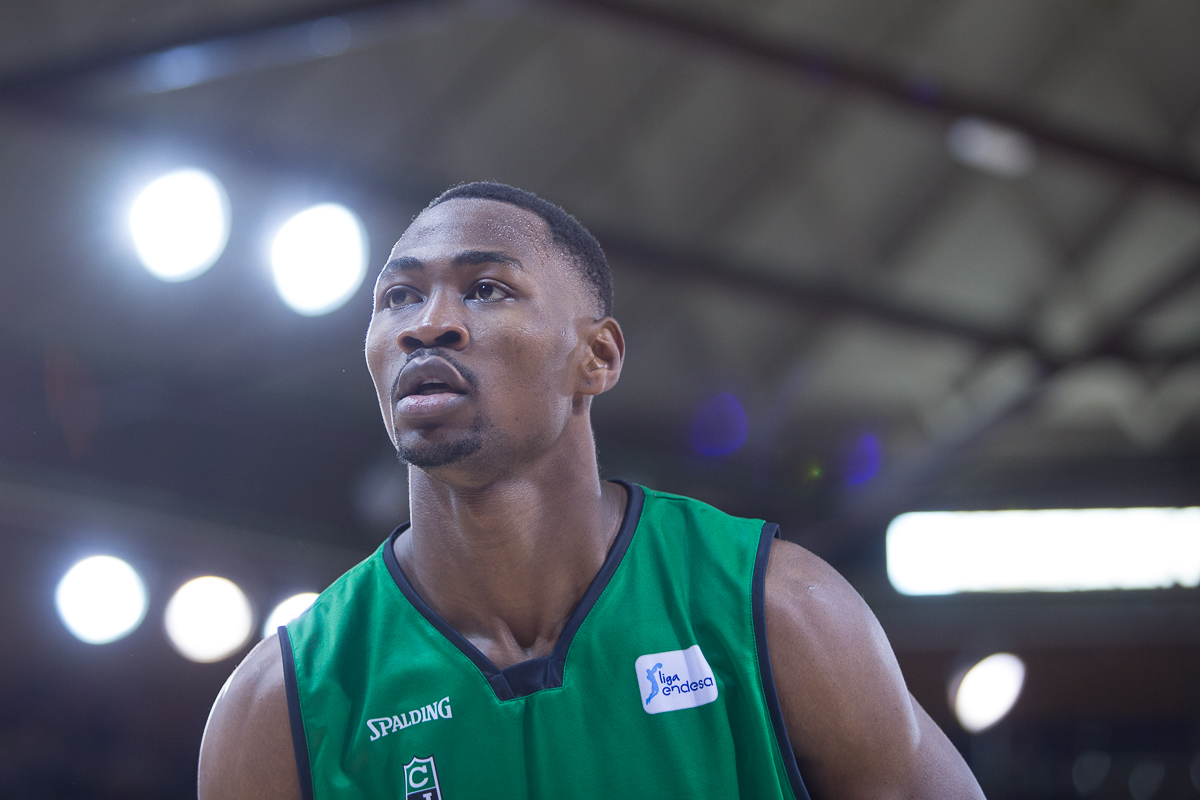
- Gudul with Joventut in January 2018

Personal information
- Born: 18 May 1994 (age 32) Kinshasa, Zaire
- Listed height: 6 ft 9 in (2.06 m)
- Listed weight: 230 lb (104 kg)

Career information
- High school: Laiser Hill Academy(Kenya)
- College: Ranger College (2012-2013); Angelo State (2013–2016)
- NBA draft: 2016: undrafted
- Playing career: 2016–present
- Position: Power forward / center

Career history
- 2016–2017: Beroe
- 2017–2018: Joventut
- 2018: Levski Sofia
- 2018–2019: Blois
- 2019–2020: Craiova
- 2020–2021: Spójnia Stargard
- 2021-2022: SLUC Nancy Basket
- 2022-2023: UB Chartres Métropole
- 2023-2024: Rueil Athletic Club
- 2024-2025: Lyonso Basket Territoire

Career highlights
- Bulgarian League champion (2018)

Omari Gudul (born 18 May 1994) is a Congolese professional basketball player. Standing at 6 ft 9 in (2.06 m), Gudul usually plays as power forward or center.

== Professional career ==
In August 2016, Gudul signed his first professional contract with BC Beroe of the Bulgarian NBL. In his first NBL season, Gudul averaged 11.8 points and 6.2 rebounds per game.

On 12 August 2019, he has signed with Craiova of the Romanian Liga Națională.

On 29 June 2020, he has signed with Spójnia Stargard of the PLK.
