= Desmond Cambridge =

American basketball player

Personal information
- Born: November 28, 1979 (age 46) Nashville, Tennessee, U.S.
- Listed height: 6 ft 1 in (1.85 m)
- Listed weight: 175 lb (79 kg)

Career information
- High school: Whites Creek (Nashville, Tennessee)
- College: Alabama A&M (1999–2002)
- NBA draft: 2002: undrafted
- Position: Point guard

Career history
- 2004–2005: Nashville Rhythm

Career highlights
- NCAA steals leader (2002); First-team All-SWAC (2002); SWAC Defensive Player of the Year (2002)

Desmond Cambridge (born November 28, 1979) is an American basketball player who played for Alabama A&M from 1999 to 2002.

== Playing career ==
In 1999–2000, Cambridge averaged 5.9 points and 2.3 steals per game. In 2000–01, he averaged 18.6 points and led the Southwestern Athletic Conference with 3.8 steals per game. In 2001–02, Cambridge led the SWAC with 20.7 points per game. He set NCAA Division I season records for steals, with 160, and steals per game, with 5.52. He finished his college career with 330 steals. Cambridge scored a career-high 50 points in a game against Texas Southern on February 24, 2002 – a Southwestern Athletic Conference record at the time.

In 2005, Cambridge played for the Nashville Rhythm of the American Basketball Association.

== Personal life ==
Cambridge has seven children, Desmond Jr., Devan, Jalon, Jaloni, Jasiah, Jordyn and Kennedy. All of his children play basketball.

== See also ==
- List of NCAA Division I men's basketball career steals leaders
- List of NCAA Division I men's basketball season steals leaders
