= Žan Tabak =

Croatian basketball player and coach (born 1970)

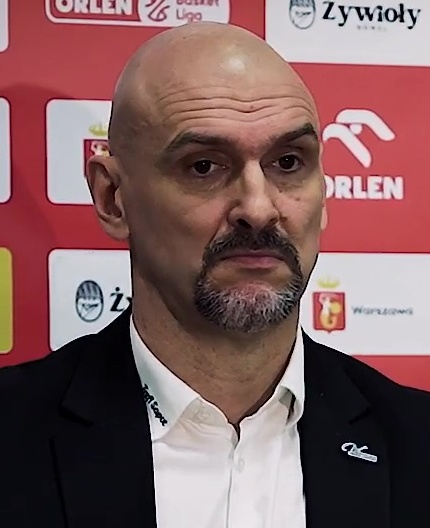
- Tabak in 2024

BC Andorra
- Title: Head coach
- League: Liga ACB

Personal information
- Born: 15 June 1970 (age 56) Split, SR Croatia, SFR Yugoslavia
- Listed height: 7 ft 0 in (2.13 m)
- Listed weight: 245 lb (111 kg)

Career information
- NBA draft: 1991: 2nd round, 51st overall pick
- Drafted by: Houston Rockets
- Playing career: 1985–2005
- Position: Center
- Number: 55, 3
- Coaching career: 2006–present

Career history

Playing
- 1985–1992: Jugoplastika / Pop 84 / Slobodna Dalmacija
- 1992–1993: Baker Livorno
- 1993–1994: Recoaro Milano
- 1994–1995: Houston Rockets
- 1995–1998: Toronto Raptors
- 1998: Boston Celtics
- 1998–1999: Fenerbahçe
- 1999–2001: Indiana Pacers
- 2001–2002: Real Madrid
- 2002–2004: Joventut Badalona
- 2005: Unicaja Málaga

Coaching
- 2006–2009: Real Madrid (assistant)
- 2009–2011: Sevilla (assistant)
- 2011–2012: Sant Josep Girona
- 2012: Trefl Sopot
- 2012–2013: Baskonia
- 2013–2015: Real Madrid (assistant)
- 2015: Fuenlabrada
- 2015–2016: Maccabi Tel Aviv
- 2016–2017: Sevilla
- 2019–2021: Stelmet Zielona Góra
- 2021: Burgos
- 2022–2025: Trefl Sopot
- 2026–present: BC Andorra

Career highlights
- As player: NBA champion (1995); 3× EuroLeague champion (1989–1991); 4× Yugoslav League champion (1988–1991); 2× Yugoslav Cup winner (1990, 1991); Croatian Cup winner (1992); Spanish Cup winner (2005); As assistant coach: EuroLeague champion (2015); EuroCup champion (2007); 2× Spanish League champion (2007, 2015); 2× Spanish Cup winner (2014, 2015); Supercopa champion (2014); As head coach: PLK champion (2024); 2× Polish Cup winner (2021, 2023); Israeli Cup winner (2016); Polish Super Cup winner (2012); PLK Coach of the Year (2021)

Career NBA statistics
- Points: 1,233 (5.0 ppg)
- Rebounds: 883 (3.6 rpg)
- Assists: 165 (0.7 apg)
- Stats at NBA.com
- Stats at Basketball Reference
Medals
Men's basketball
Representing Yugoslavia
European Championship for Junior men
Gold medal – first place	1988 Yugoslavia	Team
European Championship for Cadets
Gold medal – first place	1987 Hungary	Team
Representing Croatia
Olympic Games
Silver medal – second place	1992 Barcelona	Team
EuroBasket
Bronze medal – third place	1993 Germany

Žan Tabak (born 15 June 1970) is a Croatian professional basketball coach and former player who is now serving as the head coach for BC Andorra of the Liga ACB. His basketball career, spanning twenty years, was marked by several notable achievements, despite injuries. He was the first international player to play in the NBA Finals for two teams. Žan Tabak averaged 5.0 points in his 6-year NBA career.

== Early career ==
Born in Split, SR Croatia, SFR Yugoslavia, Tabak's father-in-law Ratomir Tvrdić was a top European basketball player, his wife played first-division basketball for Croatia, and his younger brother played professionally in Croatia.

Tabak began his basketball career in 1985, at the age of fifteen, making his debut with the Jugoplastika Split organization. Only a few years later, he and Split teammates Dino Rađa and Toni Kukoč led the club to three consecutive European Championships (1989–91), a feat only equaled in EuroLeague's storied history by its first champions, Rīgas ASK, some thirty years before.

Rađa and Kukoč were 2nd-round selections in the 1989 and 1990 National Basketball Association (NBA) Drafts, respectively.

== Professional career ==
=== Houston Rockets (1991–1995) ===
Tabak was selected by the Houston Rockets with the 24th pick in the second round (51st overall) of the 1991 NBA draft. He did not immediately play for Houston, however, opting instead to spend another year in Croatia with SD Split.

=== Return to Europe (1991–1994) ===
On June 25, 1991, Croatia, along with Slovenia, decided to end relationships with the other republics of the Yugoslavia. The newly independent state, then, was able to send its own athletes to the 1992 Summer Olympic Games; this delegation also included a national basketball team.

Along with previous Split teammates and Dražen Petrović, Tabak and the Croatian team performed well and won the silver medal; they were bested only by the star-studded United States Dream Team.

After Barcelona, Tabak continued with his career, spending two years in the Italian Serie A league. In his years there, Tabak shot the ball extremely well, with a field goal percentage of over 60%. He also averaged a double-double in points and rebounds in both the 1992–93 season for Baker Livorno and in the 1993–94 season for Recoaro Milano.

=== Return to NBA (1994–1998) ===
Over three years after he was drafted by them, Tabak was signed by the Rockets on July 20, 1994. With nine years of experience, he played his first NBA minutes on November 5, 1994. As a rookie, he saw limited playing time, averaging less than five minutes per game in thirty-seven appearances. He spent the season as a backup to Hakeem Olajuwon, who led Houston to the franchise's second NBA title that year as Tabak won his first and only NBA championship.

==== Toronto Raptors (1995–1998) ====
In the 1995 expansion draft, Tabak was selected by the Toronto Raptors.

On February 25, 1996, Tabak recorded a career high 16 rebounds in a 98–105 loss to the Dallas Mavericks.

On March 27, 1996, Tabak dropped a career high 26 points in a 94–103 loss to the Philadelphia 76ers.

He started several games and saw increased playing time, but a strained left groin kept him from competing during the close of the 1995–96 season. As for the Raptors, the franchise had an expectably bad season ending with a sub-par 21–61 record and missing the playoffs. Tabak did not fare well in the following season, either; plantar fasciitis in his left foot restricted his appearances to thirteen games.

After another average start and a transverse fracture to a metacarpal bone in his right hand, Tabak was traded in a seven-player deal to the Boston Celtics in February 1998.

Tabak played in Turkey for Fenerbahçe during the next year. He then returned to the NBA and signed with the Indiana Pacers. As back-up to Rik Smits, Tabak contributed to the Pacers' appearance in the 2000 NBA Finals, which was ultimately won by the Los Angeles Lakers.

The 2000–01 season was to be Tabak's last in the NBA, despite improved numbers and increased playing time. When asked about his decision to return to European basketball Tabak said "...I wanted to come back [to Europe] because I felt I was 31 years old and I was feeling my career was coming to the end. I didn't want to finish my career being just one of the players. I wanted to be an important player in my team."

== Post-NBA career ==
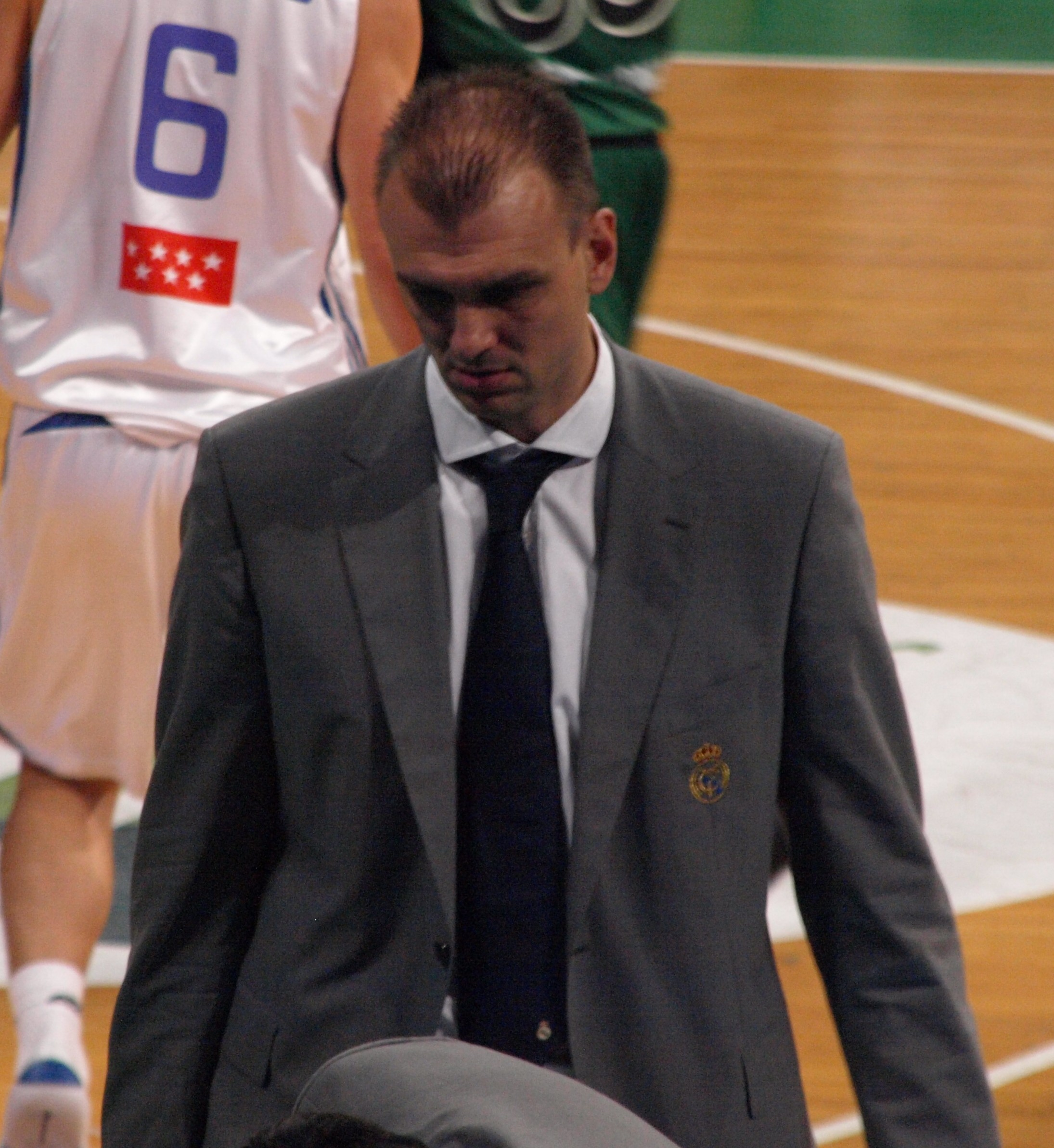
Tabak in 2008

Tabak spent the remaining four years of his playing career in Spain with Real Madrid, DKV Joventut, and Unicaja Málaga.He maintained a high caliber of play during his later career. Even as he won with Split and the Rockets in his earlier days, he ended twenty years of professional basketball also as a winner: along with Jorge Garbajosa, Tabak helped Málaga to win the 2005 King's Cup, the Spanish national cup trophy.

In 2006, he worked for the New York Knicks as an international scout.

In 2011, he debuted as head coach with Sant Josep Girona of the LEB Oro league. In 2012, he moved to Poland where he became the head coach of the 2011–12 Polish league runner-up Trefl Sopot. In November 2012, he became head coach of Saski Baskonia. With the Spanish squad, he achieved a 17-game winning streak for games played in both the EuroLeague and the Liga ACB. After being eliminated in the 2012–13 season quarterfinals, Baskonia announced that Tabak would not continue as head coach.

Tabak was the head coach of the Slovakia national basketball team from 2019 until 2021. He led them to the second round of pre-qualification for the 2023 World Cup and then led the position for personal reasons. At the same time he was the head coach of the Polish Stelmet Zielona Gora.

On June 30, 2021, Tabak signed with San Pablo Burgos of the Liga ACB. In November, 2021, after a series of bad results, he left the club.

On May 9, 2022, he has signed with Trefl Sopot of the PLK.

On January 26, 2026, he took over as head coach for MoraBanc Andorra of the Liga ACB after the departure of coach Joan Plaza. After avoiding relegation at the end of the 2025–26 ACB season, Tabak signed a contract extension for two more seasons with Andorra on June 9, 2026.

== Personal life ==
In the mid-1990s, Tabak married Gorana Tvrdić, daughter of former professional basketball player Rato Tvrdić, having met her several years earlier while playing for KK Split. The couple has three children and has been residing in Madrid since 2001.

In March 2020, Tabak's wife Gorana contracted COVID-19 in Madrid and within weeks developed severe symptoms for which she was intubated and placed in a 16-day induced coma. By late April 2020, her condition improved and she got released for home rehabilitation.
