= Aldwin Ware =

American basketball player

Personal information
- Listed height: 6 ft 2 in (1.88 m)

Career information
- High school: Hastings (Hastings, Florida)
- College: Florida A&M (1983–1988)
- NBA draft: 1988: undrafted
- Position: Point guard

Career highlights
- Black College All-American (1988); First-team All-MEAC (1988); NCAA steals leader (1988)

Aldwin Ware is an American former basketball player who played for Florida A&M from 1983 to 1988 (he redshirted in 1986–87). As a senior in 1987–88, he led the NCAA Division I in steals, with 142. That same season he recorded a 32-point, 11-rebound, 10-assist triple-double against Maryland Eastern Shore and was named to the first-team All-MEAC. Ware was also honored as a Black College All-American in 1987–88.

He never played professionally, however, and later worked as a framer for Mark Allen's Homes.

== See also ==
- List of NCAA Division I men's basketball players with 11 or more steals in a game
- List of NCAA Division I men's basketball season steals leaders
