= E. J. Jones =

American football player (born 1962)

E.J. Jones
No. 48, 39
- Position: Fullback

Personal information
- Born: February 1, 1962 (age 64); Chicago, Illinois, U.S.
- Listed height: 5 ft 11 in (1.80 m)
- Listed weight: 216 lb (98 kg)

Career information
- High school: Chicago Vocational
- College: Kansas
- NFL draft: 1984: undrafted

Career history
- Kansas City Chiefs (1984–1985); Chicago Bears (1986); Dallas Cowboys (1987)

Career NFL statistics
- Rushing yards: 26
- Rushing average: 1.9
- Receptions: 6
- Receiving yards: 47
- Stats at Pro Football Reference

Earnest Christopher "E. J." Jones (born February 1, 1962) is an American former professional football player who was a fullback in the National Football League (NFL) for the Kansas City Chiefs, Chicago Bears and Dallas Cowboys. He played college football for the Kansas Jayhawks.

== Early life ==
Jones attended Chicago Vocational High School, where he was a starter at running back. He accepted a football scholarship from the University of Kansas. As a senior, he was named a starter at fullback, registering 98 carries for 417 yards (4.3-yard avg.) and 2 rushing touchdowns.

== Professional career ==
Jones was signed as an undrafted free agent by the Kansas City Chiefs after the 1984 NFL draft on May 5. He was waived before the start of the season. In 1985, he was signed for training camp and was later released on August 26. On September 16, he was re-signed. He appeared in 5 games, registering 12 carries for 19 yards. On October 23, he was released to make room for the signing of running back Mike Pruitt.

On July 9, 1986, he was signed by the Chicago Bears as a free agent. He was waived on August 24 and placed on the injured reserve list the next day. He was released after the fourth regular season game.

In 1987, he was signed as a free agent by the Dallas Cowboys. He was waived on August 31. After the NFLPA strike was declared on the third week of the season, those contests were canceled (reducing the 16-game season to 15) and the NFL decided that the games would be played with replacement players. He was re-signed to be a part of the Dallas replacement team that was given the mock name "Rhinestone Cowboys" by the media.
