= Ken Sidwell =

American basketball and baseball coach (1936–2022)

Biographical details
- Born: January 23, 1936; Monroe, Kentucky, U.S.
- Died: December 25, 2022 (aged 86); Franklin, Tennessee, U.S.

Playing career

Basketball
- 1954–1958: Tennessee Tech

Baseball
- 1955–1956: Tennessee Tech
- Position: Guard (basketball)

Coaching career (HC unless noted)

Basketball
- 1962–1964: Belmont
- 1964–1969: Tennessee Tech
- 1972–1974: Belmont

Baseball
- 1963–1964: Belmont

Administrative career (AD unless noted)
- 19??–19??: Belmont

Head coaching record
- Overall: 103–109 (basketball) ?–? (baseball)

Accomplishments and honors

Awards
- 3× All-OVC (1954–1956)

Kenneth Boyd Sidwell (January 23, 1936 – December 25, 2022) was an American college head basketball and baseball head coach. He coached Belmont's basketball team from 1962 to 1964 and again from 1972 to 1974, as well as Tennessee Tech from 1964 to 1969. In baseball, Sidwell coached Belmont from 1963 to 1964. He was also the first full-time athletic director in Belmont's history. He was inducted into Belmont's Hall of Fame as a coach and administrator in 1993.

As an athlete, Sidwell starred in both sports when he attended Tennessee Tech. In his four-year basketball career, Sidwell was a three-time all-Ohio Valley Conference player, a Little College All-American, and when he graduated he was the school's all-time leading scorer. He had his jersey retired and was inducted into Tennessee Tech's Hall of Fame in 1977.

Sidwell died in Franklin, Tennessee, on December 25, 2022, at the age of 86.

== Head coaching record ==
=== Basketball ===
Record table
| Season | Team | Overall | Conference | Standing | Postseason |
|---|---|---|---|---|---|
Belmont Bruins (Volunteer State Athletic Conference) (1962–1964)
| 1962–63 | Belmont | 5–14 | | | |
| 1963–64 | Belmont | 10–8 | | | |
Tennessee Tech Golden Eagles (Ohio Valley Conference) (1964–1969)
| 1964–65 | Tennessee Tech | 14–11 | 8–6 | 4th | |
| 1965–66 | Tennessee Tech | 17–8 | 8–6 | T–3rd | |
| 1966–67 | Tennessee Tech | 12–11 | 6–8 | 6th | |
| 1967–68 | Tennessee Tech | 10–16 | 4–10 | T–7th | |
| 1968–69 | Tennessee Tech | 13–11 | 5–9 | 6th | |
| Tennessee Tech: | | 66–57 (.537) | 31–39 | | |
Belmont Bruins () (1972–1974)
| 1972–73 | Belmont | 8–18 | 2–7 | | |
| 1973–74 | Belmont | 14–12 | 3–5 | | |
| Belmont: | | 37–52 (.416) | | | |
| Total: | | 103–109 (.486) | | | |

=== Baseball ===
Record table
| Season | Team | Overall | Conference | Standing | Postseason |
|---|---|---|---|---|---|
Belmont Bruins (Volunteer State Athletic Conference) (1963–1964)
| 1963 | Belmont | 15–13 | | | |
| 1964 | Belmont | ?–? | | | |
| Belmont: | | ?–? | | | |
| Total: | | ?–? | | | |
