= Jim Hagan (basketball) =

American basketball player (1938–2021)

Personal information
- Born: February 18, 1938 Hardin County, Kentucky, U.S.
- Died: May 4, 2021 (aged 83) Bartlesville, Oklahoma, U.S.
- Listed height: 6 ft 10 in (2.08 m)
- Listed weight: 215 lb (98 kg)

Career information
- High school: Glendale (Glendale, Kentucky)
- College: Tennessee Tech (1957–1960)
- NBA draft: 1960: 3rd round, 18th overall pick
- Drafted by: Minneapolis Lakers
- Playing career: 1960–1964
- Position: Center
- Number: 24

Career history
- 1960–1964: Phillips 66ers

Career highlights
- 2× AAU All-American (1963, 1965); Third-team All-American – AP (1959); 2× First-team All-OVC (1959, 1960); No. 42 jersey retired by Tennessee Tech Golden Eagles
- Stats at Basketball Reference

James Stephen Hagan Sr. (February 18, 1938 – May 4, 2021) was an American basketball player. He was an All-American college player at Tennessee Tech before earning similar honors with the Amateur Athletic Union's Phillips 66ers.

From Glendale, Kentucky, Hagan played for Tennessee Tech from 1957 to 1960. While there, the 6 ft 10 in (2.08 m) center became one of the best players in program history. The slender big man was known as a prolific scorer with a deft shooting touch, particularly from the free throw line. In his junior season, Hagan used his offensive skill very effectively in coach John Oldham's high post offense. Hagan averaged 28.8 points per game and engaged in a highly publicized national scoring race with eventual scoring leader Oscar Robertson. At the close of the season, Hagan was named first-team All-Ohio Valley Conference and a third-team All-American by the Associated Press.

In his senior season, Hagan's scoring average dipped to 24.3 points per game. He was again named All-OVC and was the only unanimous choice for the squad. Hagan left Tennessee Tech holding a number of records - including total career points (1,539, since eclipsed), total career rebounds (1,108), season scoring average (28.8 points per game in 1958–59) and career scoring average (21.1 points per game). He was inducted into the Tennessee Tech athletic Hall of Fame in 1979 and his jersey has been retired by the school.

Following the close of his college career, Hagan was selected by the Minneapolis Lakers in the third round of the 1960 NBA draft (18th pick overall). Concerned that his thin frame might have trouble in a league marked with burly big men, he instead chose to join the Phillips 66ers of the National Industrial Basketball League. With the 66ers, Hagan won an Amateur Athletic Union (AAU) championship in 1962 and was named an AAU All-American in 1963 and 1964 before retiring to focus on his business career with Phillips.

Hagan died on May 4, 2021.
