= Jay Threatt =

American basketball player (born 1989)

No. 10 – Rapid București
- Position: Point guard
- League: Liga Națională

Personal information
- Born: August 8, 1989 (age 37) Richmond, Virginia, U.S.
- Listed height: 5 ft 11 in (1.80 m)
- Listed weight: 175 lb (79 kg)

Career information
- High school: Highland Springs (Highland Springs, Virginia)
- College: George Mason (2007–2008); Delaware State (2009–2012)
- NBA draft: 2012: undrafted
- Playing career: 2012–present

Career history
- 2012–2013: Snæfell
- 2013–2014: MLP Academics Heidelberg
- 2014–2015: BC Nokia
- 2015–2016: Phoenix Galați
- 2016–2017: Poitiers Basket 86
- 2017–2018: Denain Voltaire Basket
- 2018: Poitiers Basket 86
- 2018–2019: Pieno žvaigždės
- 2019–2020: Stal Ostrów Wielkopolski
- 2021: Spójnia Stargard
- 2021: Élan Béarnais
- 2021: Larisa
- 2021–2022: Wilki Morskie Szczecin
- 2022: Golden Eagle Ylli
- 2020–2023: FC Porto
- 2023–present: Rapid București

Career highlights
- Icelandic All-Star Game MVP (2013); Icelandic All-Star (2013); Úrvalsdeild karla assist leader (2013); 2× NCAA steals leader (2010, 2012); First-team All-MEAC (2012)

Jay L. Threatt (born August 8, 1989) is an American professional basketball player for Rapid București of the Liga Națională. He played for the Delaware State Hornets for three seasons and twice led the NCAA in steals. He was the first ever Division I player to hold at least a share of the steals title in more than one season.

== High school career ==
Threatt played high school basketball for Highland Springs High School in Virginia for four years. As a senior, he averaged 15 points, 7 assists, 3.5 rebounds, and 2.7 steals per game, helping his team win the AAA state championship. That year, he was also named to the All-District, All-Metro, and All-Region teams.

== College career ==
Threatt enrolled at George Mason but transferred to Delaware State after his freshman season. He did not compete in 2008–09 due to NCAA transfer rules.

In 2009–10, Threatt averaged 7.9 points per game. His 4.2 assists per game ranked second in the Mid-Eastern Athletic Conference (MEAC), and his 2.32 assist-to-turnover ratio led the MEAC. Threatt also led all NCAA Division I players in steals per game, at 2.8. He had 82 total steals and recorded two or more steals in nineteen of the Hornets' 29 games.

In 2010–11, Threatt was his team's starting point guard in all 30 games. He averaged 9.7 points. Threatt led the MEAC in assists (6.0), steals (3.1), and assist-to-turnover ratio (2.7). Nationally, he was tied for second in steals. He had 3 or more steals in 18 games. On January 10, he made the game-winning basket as time expired in a 62-60 victory over South Carolina State.

In 2011–12, Threatt scored 8.8 points per game. He led the MEAC with 6.0 assists per game, and he led the nation for the second time in steals, with 3.0. He was the first ever Division I player to hold at least a share of the steals title in more than one season. He was also selected to the All-MEAC First Team. Threatt finished his college career with the most assists (458) and second-most steals (253) in MEAC history.

== Professional career ==
Following the close of his college career, Threatt signed with Snæfell of Icelandic Úrvalsdeild karla. He was named MVP of the Icelandic All-Star game in January 2013, netting a triple-double in the game with 21 points, 11 rebounds and 10 assists. During the regular season he averaged 18 points and league leading 9.5 assists per game, helping Snæfell finish with a third-best 16-6 record. In game 2 in Snæfells semi-finals matchup against Stjarnan in the playoffs, Threatt dislocated his toe and missed the next game which Snæfell lost. He tried to play through the injury in game 4 but was unable to prevent Snæfell losing the game, and the series, to Stjarnan.

On November 20, 2014 he signed with Finnish team BC Nokia.

On January 20, 2021, he signed with Spójnia Stargard of the PLK. On April 8, 2021, he moved to Élan Béarnais of the French LNB Pro A. On August 12, 2021, Threatt signed with Larisa of the Greek Basket League. On November 23, 2021, he parted ways with the Greek club. In four games, he averaged 9 points, 2.7 rebounds and 3.3 assists per contest.

On November 23, 2021, he has signed with Wilki Morskie Szczecin of the Polish Basketball League (PLK).

== Personal life ==
Threatt was born on August 8, 1989, to Cheryl and Jay Threatt. He graduated from Highland Springs High School in 2007. His father played basketball at Virginia State University. His younger brother, Jarvis, played for the University of Delaware.
