= Stephen Kite =

American basketball player

Personal information
- Listed height: 6 ft 6 in (1.98 m)

Career information
- High school: Turner (Atlanta, Georgia)
- College: Tennessee Tech (1982–1986)
- NBA draft: 1986: undrafted
- Position: Forward

Career highlights
- OVC Player of the Year (1985); 3× First-team All-OVC (1984–1986); Second-team All-OVC (1983); OVC Rookie of the Year (1983); OVC All-Freshman team (1983); No. 23 jersey retired by Tennessee Tech Golden Eagles

Stephen Kite Sr. is an American former professional basketball player. He played college basketball for the Tennessee Tech Golden Eagles and was selected as the Ohio Valley Conference (OVC) Player of the Year in 1985.

== High school career ==
Kite is a native of Atlanta, Georgia, and attended Turner High School. He averaged 22 points per game during his senior season but was overlooked by major college recruiters because his team had a 15–9 record. Kite chose to play for Tennessee Tech over offers from Chattanooga, Georgia Tech, Auburn and UTEP.

== College career ==
Kite made an immediate impact on the Golden Eagles as a freshman; he led the team to 16 wins during the 1982–83 season after six seasons of losing records. His 360 points set a freshman scoring record in the Ohio Valley Conference (OVC). Kite was selected as the OVC Rookie of the Year in 1983.

Kite led the Golden Eagles to a 19–9 record and their first outright conference championship in 27 years during the 1984–85 season. The Golden Eagles received their first-ever bid to the National Invitation Tournament where they lost in the first round to the Tennessee Volunteers. Kite averaged 16.3 points and 7.6 rebounds per game during the season and was selected as the OVC Player of the Year.

Kite averaged 16.8 points and 7.4 rebounds per game during his senior season. The Golden Eagles had lost several key starters to graduation and slumped to a 14–15 record.

Kite led the Golden Eagles in points, rebounds and steals for three seasons. He led the team in blocks during his senior season. Kite left the Golden Eagles as its all-time leader in points (1,806) and steals (213); he ranked second in rebounds (844) and blocks (55). On February 22, 1986, his no. 23 jersey was retired by the team as the first player to receive the honor.

== Post-playing career ==
Kite had been in contention for a National Basketball Association (NBA) tryout but was sidelined by a broken foot and remained in a cast for several months. He served as a student assistant coach for the Golden Eagles during the 1986–87 season. Kite played professional basketball in Denmark and the Netherlands.

Kite received his degree in interdisciplinary studies from Tennessee Tech in 2002.

Kite was inducted into the Tennessee Tech Athletics Hall of Fame in 2003. He was selected to the OVC 75th anniversary team in 2023.
