= Van Usher =

American basketball player

Personal information
- Born: February 27, 1970 (age 56)
- Listed height: 6 ft 0 in (1.83 m)
- Listed weight: 182 lb (83 kg)

Career information
- High school: Lithonia (Lithonia, Georgia)
- College: Tennessee Tech (1989–1992)
- NBA draft: 1992: undrafted
- Position: Point guard

Career highlights
- NCAA steals leader (1991); NCAA assists leader (1992); First-team All-OVC (1992); Second-team All-OVC (1991)

Van Usher (born February 27, 1970) is an American former basketball player. He played college basketball for the Tennessee Tech Golden Eagles from 1989 to 1992. A 6 ft 0 in (1.83 m) point guard, he holds school and Ohio Valley Conference records for single game, season, and career assist and steal totals. In 1990–91, he led NCAA Division I in steals with a 3.71 per game average. He had recorded 104 steals in 28 games en route to being named an OVC Second Team honoree. The following year as a senior, he led Division I in assists while averaging 8.76 per game. In 29 games, he accumulated 254 total assists as he earned an OVC First Team honor. He is one of two college basketball players to lead the country in both steals and assists (Basketball Hall of Fame inductee Jason Kidd is the other). After college, he signed with the Rochester Renegade of the Continental Basketball Association (CBA) but was placed on the injured reserve list before the start of his stint.

== See also ==
- List of NCAA Division I men's basketball season steals leaders
- List of NCAA Division I men's basketball season assists leaders
