= Anthony Fisher (basketball, born 1986) =

American basketball player

Anthony Fisher אנתוני פישר
No. 3 – Maccabi Haifa
- Position: Shooting guard
- League: Israeli Basketball Premier League

Personal information
- Born: January 31, 1986 (age 40) Alpharetta, Georgia, U.S.
- Listed height: 6 ft 3 in (1.91 m)
- Listed weight: 185 lb (84 kg)

Career information
- High school: Chattahoochee (Johns Creek, Georgia)
- College: Tennessee Tech (2004–2008)
- NBA draft: 2008: undrafted
- Playing career: 2008–present

Anthony Fisher (Hebrew: אנתוני פישר; born January 31, 1986) is an American-Israeli basketball player for Maccabi Haifa in the Israel Basketball Premier League. He plays the shooting guard position.

== Early and personal life ==
He was born in Alpharetta, Georgia. His parents are William and Sandra Fisher. He is 6 ft 3 in (1.91 m) tall, and weighs 185 pounds (84 kg).

== Basketball career ==
He attended Chattahoochee High School ('04) in Johns Creek, Georgia. Playing basketball there, as a senior he averaged 20 points and 4 assists per game, won the Fulton County and Regional Player of the Year awards, and was Georgia Class 5A All-State team.

He attended Tennessee Tech ('08). Playing for the basketball team, in 2006–07 he was third in the Ohio Valley Conference in points per game (17.2), free throw percentage (.799) and assists per game (4.2), and seventh in field goal percentage (.417). In 2007–08 he was fourth in the OVC in points per game (17.1). In 2007 he was All-OVC First Team, and in 2008 he was All-OVC Second Team. His 1,726 career points are fifth-most in team history.

On May 20, 2020, he signed with Maccabi Haifa in the Israel Basketball Premier League.
