= Ron Filipek =

American basketball player

Personal information
- Born: February 5, 1944
- Died: December 9, 2005 (aged 61) Cookeville, Tennessee
- Listed height: 6 ft 5 in (1.96 m)
- Listed weight: 205 lb (93 kg)

Career information
- High school: St. Joseph's (Camden, New Jersey)
- College: Tennessee Tech (1964–1967)
- NBA draft: 1967: 9th round, 100th overall pick
- Drafted by: Philadelphia 76ers
- Playing career: 1967–1969
- Position: Forward
- Number: 20

Career history
- 1967–1968: Philadelphia 76ers
- 1968–1969: Wilkes-Barre Barons

Career highlights
- EPBL champion (1969)
- Stats at NBA.com
- Stats at Basketball Reference

Ronald Stanley Filipek (February 5, 1944 – December 9, 2005) was a professional basketball player who spent one season in the National Basketball Association (NBA) as a member of the Philadelphia 76ers (1967–68). He attended Tennessee Technological University where he was drafted by the 76ers in the ninth round of the 1967 NBA draft.

Filipek played for the Wilkes-Barre Barons of the Eastern Professional Basketball League (EPBL) from 1968 to 1969. He won an EPBL championship with the Barons in 1969.

== Career statistics ==
Legend
| GP | Games played | GS | Games started | MPG | Minutes per game |
| FG% | Field goal percentage | 3P% | 3-point field goal percentage | FT% | Free throw percentage |
| RPG | Rebounds per game | APG | Assists per game | SPG | Steals per game |
| BPG | Blocks per game | PPG | Points per game | **Bold** | Career high |

=== NBA ===
==== Regular season ====
| Year | Team | GP | MPG | FG% | FT% | RPG | APG | PPG |
|---|---|---|---|---|---|---|---|---|
| 1967–68 | Philadelphia | 19 | 3.8 | .383 | .500 | 1.3 | .4 | 2.3 |
