= Robert L. Hines =

American comedian

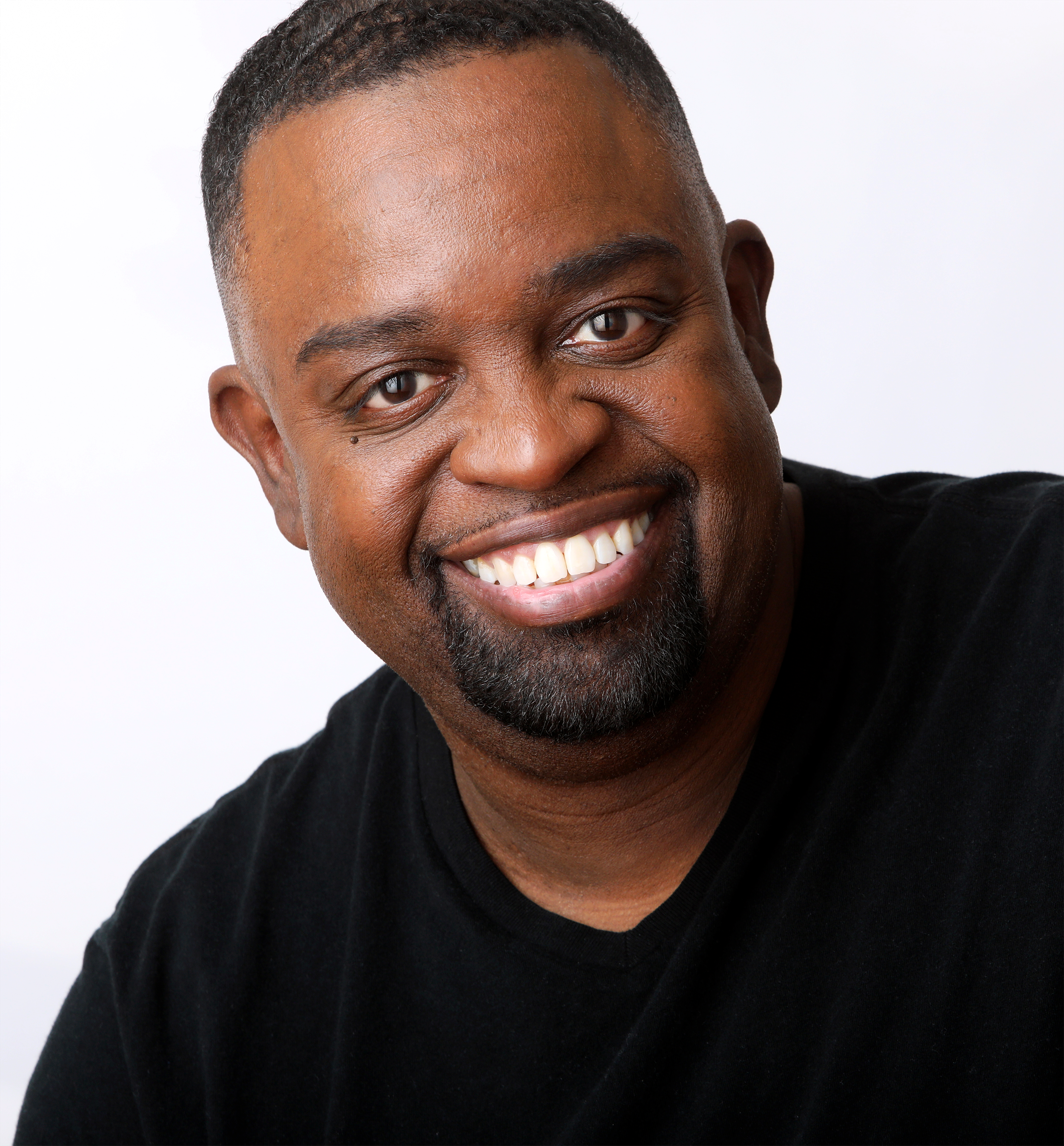
- Hines in 2019
- Born: Chicago, Illinois, U.S.
- Education: Chicago Vocational High School
- Notable work: Toby Jones – Toby Jones Big ASS (viral video series)
- Spouse: Reneé Hines

Comedy career
- Years active: 1991–present
- Medium: Stand-up, film, television, web series
- Genres: Observational comedy, character comedy, improvisational comedy
- Subjects: Family, incarceration, marriage, overeating
- Website: robertlhines.com

Robert L. Hines is an American comedian and actor. He is best known for his role as Toby Jones in a series of viral spoof commercials that include "Jones' Good-Ass BBQ and Foot Massage".

== Early life ==
Hines was born in Chicago, Illinois to Vera Mae (née King) and Bobby Frank Hines. He attended Chicago Vocational High School on Chicago's South Side. In August 1988, Hines enlisted in the U.S. Army Reserves and was a reservist for six years, serving as a Cannon Crewman, Field Artillery.

== Career ==
=== Working at Cook County Jail ===
To support himself while honing his skills as a comedian, Hines began working as a correctional officer at Chicago's Cook County Jail in 1994, at the age of 24. He quit the job in 2003 when he was cast to star in the independent comedy movie, Chasing Robert, which featured performances by Andy Dick, Larry Miller, Paul Provenza, Rick Overton and Dan Castellaneta.

=== Stand-up comedy ===
Hines started doing stand-up comedy at the age of 21. His first performance was in June 1991 at the Funny Firm, a Chicago comedy club owned by Len Austrevitch, who would later cast Hines in his first film roles. After his set, Hines met local comedians Bernie Mac, Evan Lionel, Daran Howard and Shay Shay (Phillip White). Mac and Lionel booked Hines on the spot for their Monday night show at Chicago's Cotton Club, where Hines continued to appear for nearly a year. All four comedians became mentors and friends of Hines. From 1991 to 1996, Daran Howard tapped Hines to perform in his Laugh Fest College Comedy Tour with shows targeted to historically Black colleges. Hines credits Shay Shay with helping him learn to make his comedy more personal, telling Steven Johnson of the Chicago Tribune, "Shay told me I've got to show them my pain."

In addition to touring and club performances (primarily in the Midwest), Hines has made a number of national TV appearances, including BET's Comic View, Comedy Central's Comic Justice and Fox's Uptown Comedy Club. In 1995, Hines was nominated for the Sammy Davis Jr. Musical Comedy Award by BET's Comic View Comedy Awards TV show.

=== Toby Jones ===
In 2008, Hines was cast to portray the character Toby Jones in an internet commercial spoof titled Jones' Big Ass Truck Rental and Storage produced by a Chicago sketch comedy group. The group, members of BDEC, had spotted Hines during a stand-up comedy performance and thought he would valuably add to their creative process with the commercial. Hines quickly became the creative force behind the Jones character. He is known internet wide as Toby Jones "The BBQ King of Chicago". Hines created a real web address and provided his actual cell number in the commercial. This was inspired by the local weird hard-sell TV commercials often seen in Chicago.

The Jones' Big Ass Truck Rental and Storage video was released in November 2008, and became a viral video sensation, garnering over 700,000 views in its first two weeks of release. Hines received hundreds of calls to his cellphone from all over the world, with many people believing the spot was advertising a real business.

In April 2009, Big Dog Eat Child released Jones' Good ASS BBQ and Foot Massage, and followed with Jones' Cheap Ass Prepaid Legal and Daycare Academy in November 2009. Subsequent releases have included recordings of actual phone messages left on 'Toby's' voice mail, a series of "Ask Toby" advice videos, and spoofs of 'Legal Retraction & Clarification' videos from the 'urban entrepreneur'.

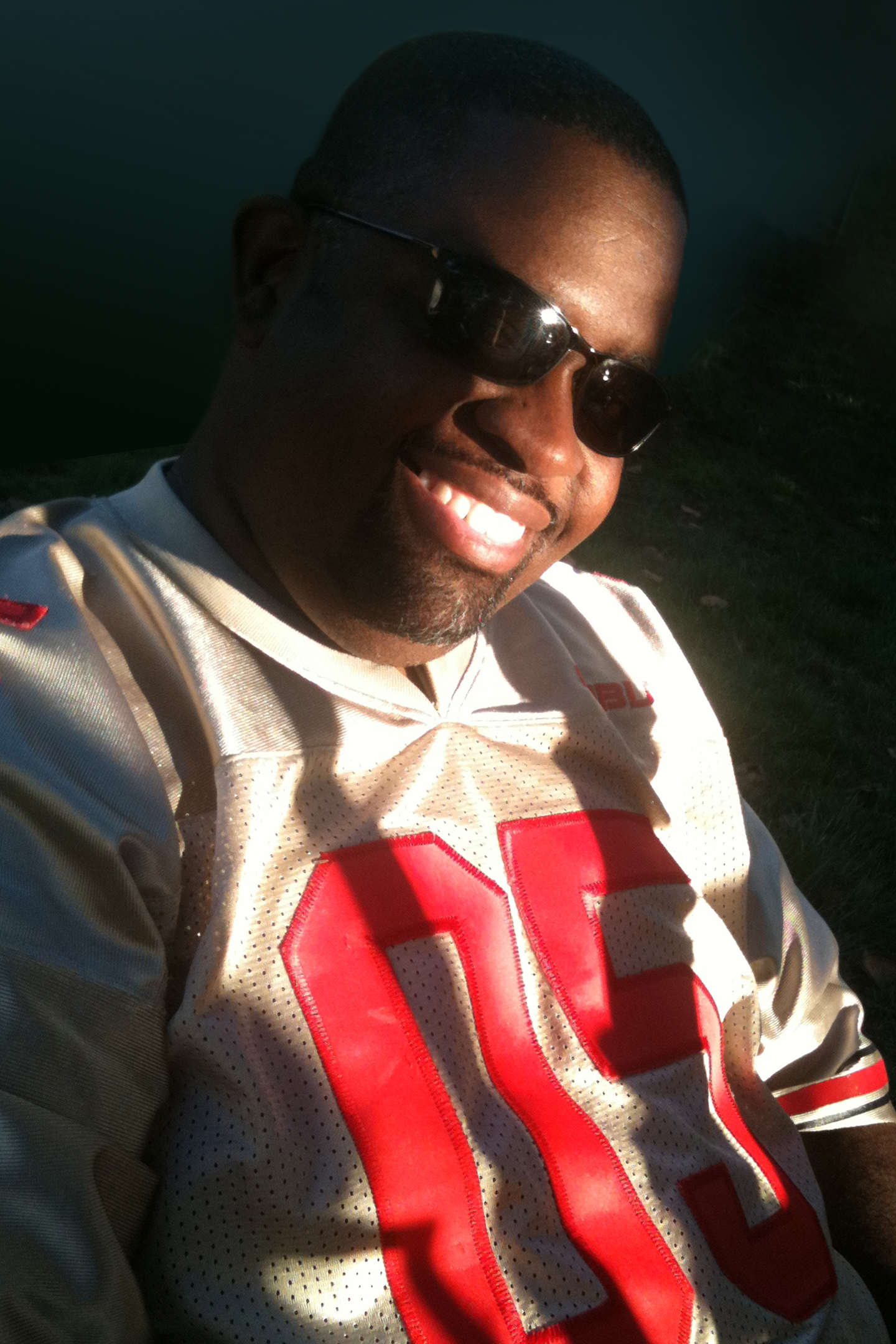
Hines in 2012

Recognition for the videos (often in competition with real commercials) has often been as wacky as the spots themselves:

- Esquire.com's Daniel Murphy included Jones' Big Ass Truck Rental and Storage among "The Five Most Terrifying Local TV Christmas Commercials".
- Jimmy Traina at Sports Illustrated.com named it "Commercial of the Day".
- In the UK, Channel 4's Rude Tube TV show listed Jones' Big Ass Truck Rental and Storage at #13 on its list of the top 50 viral videos.
- Duncan Riley of The Inquisitor urged his readers to "Check out the funniest home made commercial of the year."
- Zagat, the famed food and restaurant guide, named Jones' Good ASS BBQ and Foot Massage one of "The 8 Wackiest BBQ Commercials".

During the NBA Playoffs in 2016, Stephen Curry, the all-star guard for the Golden State Warriors, stayed loose before games by dancing and singing with arena employees to the Jones' Barbecue and Foot Massage jingle. The pre-game ritual is apparently linked to Curry's assertion that big players who switch onto him are "barbecue chicken". During a segment that year on ABC's Good Morning America, Hines was asked what he thought of all the media attention he was getting from Curry's pre-game routine, to which he replied, "You're welcome Steph!"

=== Jail material ===
In 2012, Hines began devoting an increasing amount of his stand-up performances to material from his days as a correctional officer. Hines had largely avoided the topic earlier in his career due to training he received that urged officers to pursue outside interests and to compartmentalize their work at the jail as a way to avoid burnout.

== Filmography ==
Film
Year	Title	Role	Notes
2009	Assisted Living (short)	Robert	
2007	Chasing Robert	Robert L. Brown	
1998	Bullet on a Wire	Guard	
Television
Year	Title	Role	Notes
2012	Vidiots	as Toby Jones	TV One, Guest
1998	ComicView	Himself	BET, Stand-up comedian
1994	Uptown Comedy Club	Himself	Fox, Stand-up comedian
1993	Comic Justice	Himself	Comedy Central, Stand-up comedian
1992	ComicView	Himself	BET, Stand-up comedian
Selected Internet Videos
Year	Title	Role	Notes
2009	Jones' Big Ass Truck Rental and Storage (2)	Toby Jones	Viral video
2009	Jones' Cheap ASS Prepaid Legal and Daycare Academy	Toby Jones	Viral video
2009	Jones' Good ASS BBQ and Foot Massage	Toby Jones	Viral video
2008	Jones' Big ASS Truck Rental and Storage	Toby Jones	Viral video
