= Spójnia Stargard =

- Leagues: I Liga
- Founded: September 1949; 77 years ago
- Arena: Hala Miejska
- Capacity: 2,500
- Location: Stargard, Poland
- Main sponsor: PGE
- President: Beata Radziszewska
- Head coach: Andrej Urlep
- Team captain: Paweł Kikowski
- Championships: 1 Polish Second League
- Website: https://spojniastargard.com/
Home	Away

Spójnia Stargard, also known as shortly Spójnia, is a professional Polish basketball team based in Stargard, Poland, currently (as of 2022) playing in the I Liga, the second tier in Polish basketball.

Spójnia hosts its games at the Hala Miejska.

== History ==
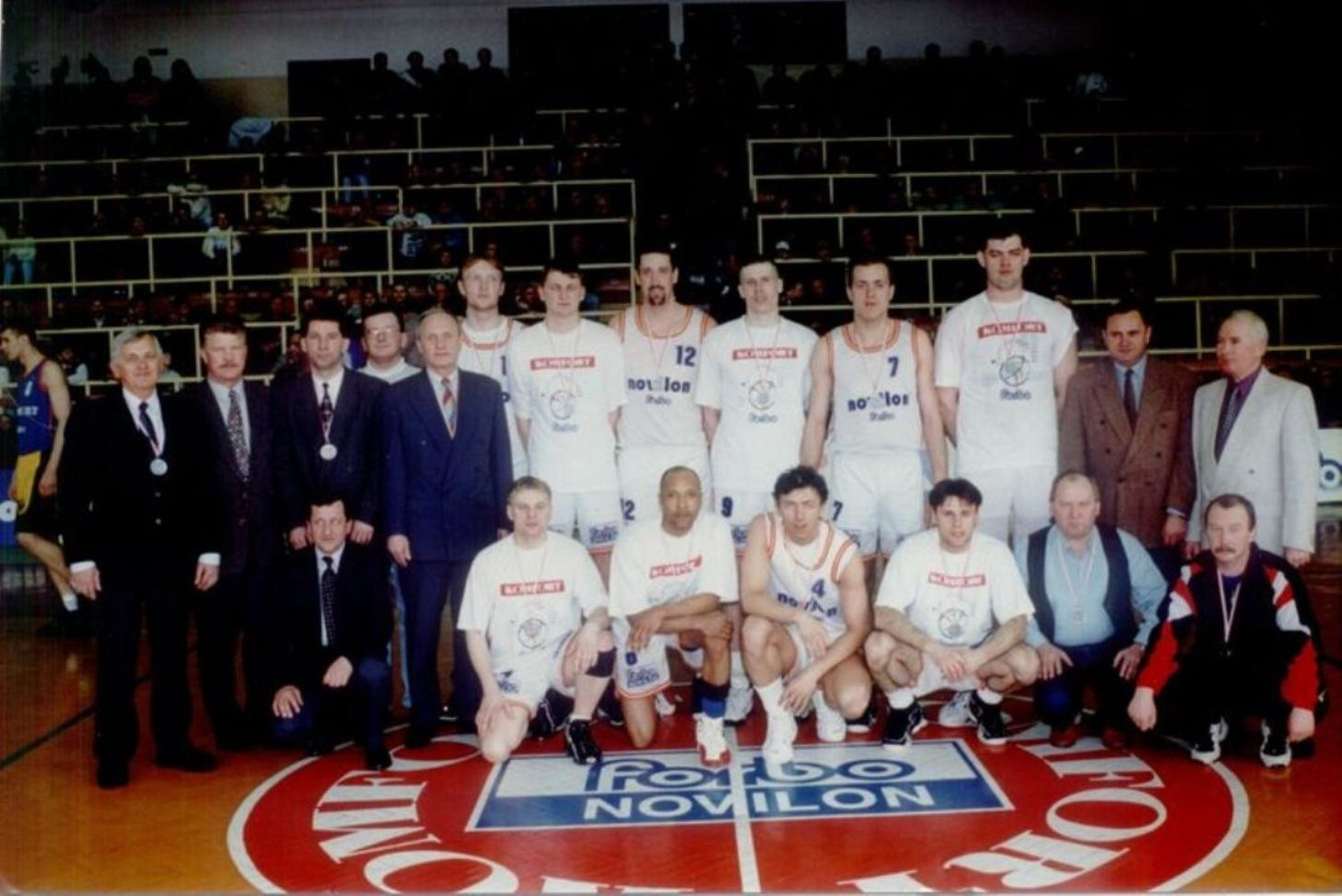
Silver team from the 1996–97 season

Spójnia Stargard was founded in 1949 as multi-sport club. Its first chairman was Józef Tropaczyński, former member of the Polish resistance movement in World War II and Lieutenant of the Anders' Army.

In the 1996–97 season, Spójnia for the first time in its history reached the finals of the Polish Basketball League, which it lost to Znicz Pruszków.

In May 2018, Spójnia promoted to the PLK after winning the I Liga championship as the team beat Sokół Łańcut 3–0 in the playoff finals. In its debut 2018–19 season, the team finished as 13th with a 9–21 record.

In the 2019 offseason, PGE Polska Grupa Energetyczna became main sponsor of the team which was re-named PGE Spójnia. In the 2020–21 season, Spójna reached the final of the 2021 Polish Basketball Cup. The team lost the final 86–73 to Zielona Góra in Lublin.

== Honours ==
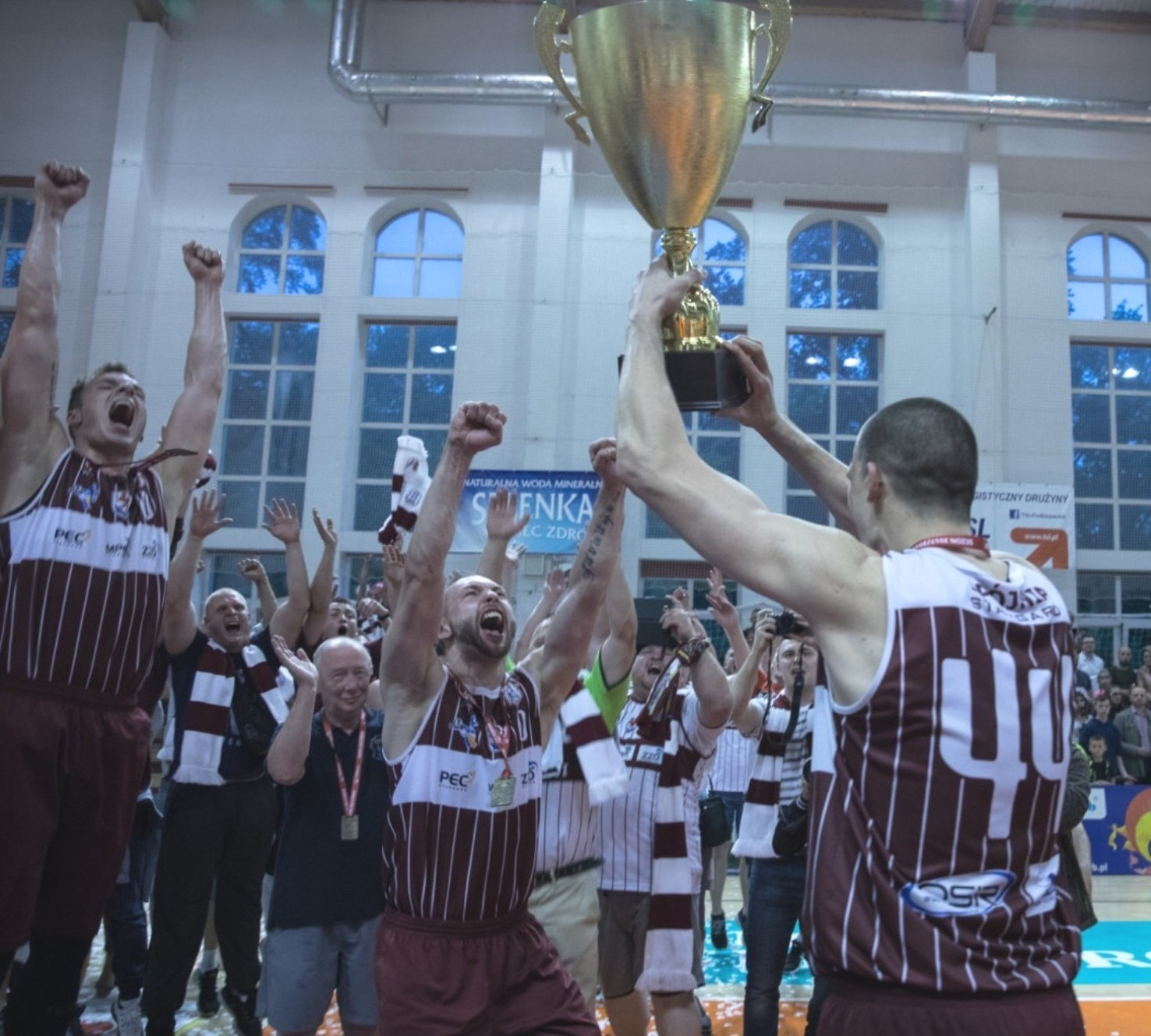
Spójnia players lifting the I Liga trophy in May 2018

Polish Basketball League (Polish Championship)

- Runners-up (1): 1996–97

Polish Basketball Cup

- Runners-up (1): 2021

I Liga

- Champions (1): 2017–18

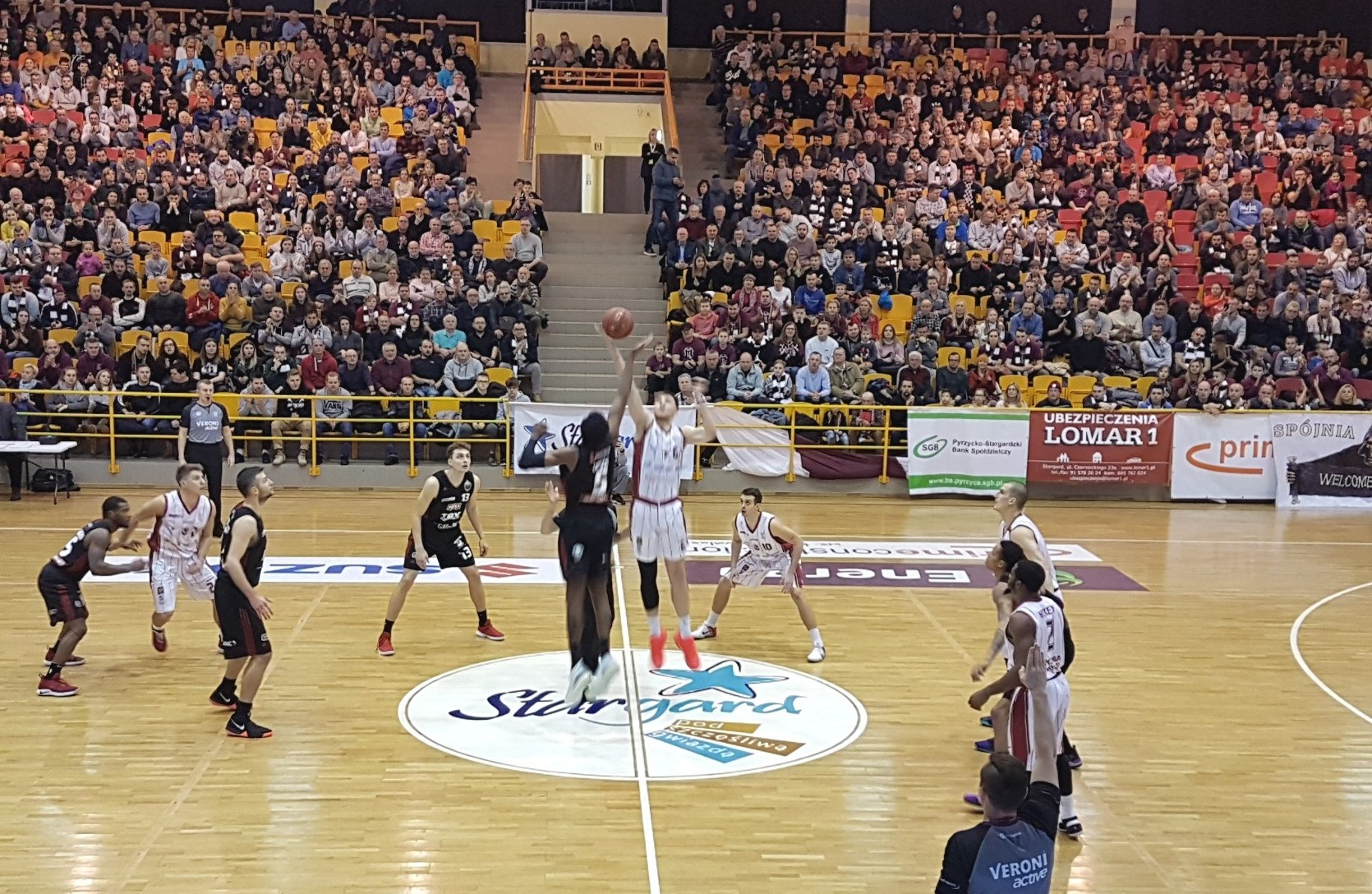
Home game with Start Lublin in the 2018–19 PLK season

== Players ==
=== Current roster ===
Spójnia Stargard roster
Players
Coaches

Pos.	No.	Nat.	Name	Ht.	Age
G	1	(Poland)	Góralski, Bartosz	1.90 m (6 ft 3 in)	17 – 4 October 2008
G	2	(Poland)	Wojdak, Jakub	1.93 m (6 ft 4 in)	19 – 23 March 2007
PG	3	(Poland)	Hensler, Mikołaj	1.85 m (6 ft 1 in)	18 – 6 January 2008
C	4	(Latvia)	Gromovs, Iļja	2.11 m (6 ft 11 in)	32 – 4 August 1994
PG	7	(Poland)	Rajewicz, Wiktor	1.75 m (5 ft 9 in)	26 – 10 April 2000
F/C	8	(Poland)	Kopycki, Paweł	2.06 m (6 ft 9 in)	26 – 3 May 2000
G/F	9	(Poland)	Karolak, Jakub	1.96 m (6 ft 5 in)	32 – 26 September 1993
G	10	(Poland)	Wadowski, Igor	1.96 m (6 ft 5 in)	30 – 18 January 1996
SG	11	(Poland)	Kikowski, Paweł (C)	1.91 m (6 ft 3 in)	40 – 27 April 1986
F	12	(Poland)	Mokros, Jarosław	2.01 m (6 ft 7 in)	36 – 21 January 1990
SG	13	(Poland)	Bryła, Mateusz	1.84 m (6 ft 0 in)	20 – 13 March 2006
SF	14	(Poland)	Czerlonko, Wojciech	2.01 m (6 ft 7 in)	30 – 16 November 1995
G	20	(United Kingdom) (United States)	Ray, Jalen	1.88 m (6 ft 2 in)	27 – 15 June 1999
G	33	(Puerto Rico)	Han, Francis	1.85 m (6 ft 1 in)	39 – 14 January 1987
C	46	(Poland)	Jęch, Aleksander	2.16 m (7 ft 1 in)	22 – 14 April 2004
G	55	(Poland)	Szmit, Szymon	1.95 m (6 ft 5 in)	24 – 25 July 2002

Head coach

- (Poland) Marek Popiołek

Assistant coach(es)

- (Poland) Michał Trypuć
- (Poland) Konrad Koziorowicz

Legend

- (C) Team captain
- Injured

- Roster
Updated: February 1, 2026

Note: Flags indicate national team eligibility at FIBA-sanctioned events. Players may hold other non-FIBA nationalities not displayed.

=== Notable players ===
Note: Flags indicate national team eligibility at FIBA-sanctioned events. Players may hold other non-FIBA nationalities not displayed.

Criteria

To appear in this section a player must have either:

- Set a club record or won an individual award while at the club
- Played at least one official international match for their national team at any time
- Played at least one official NBA match at any time.

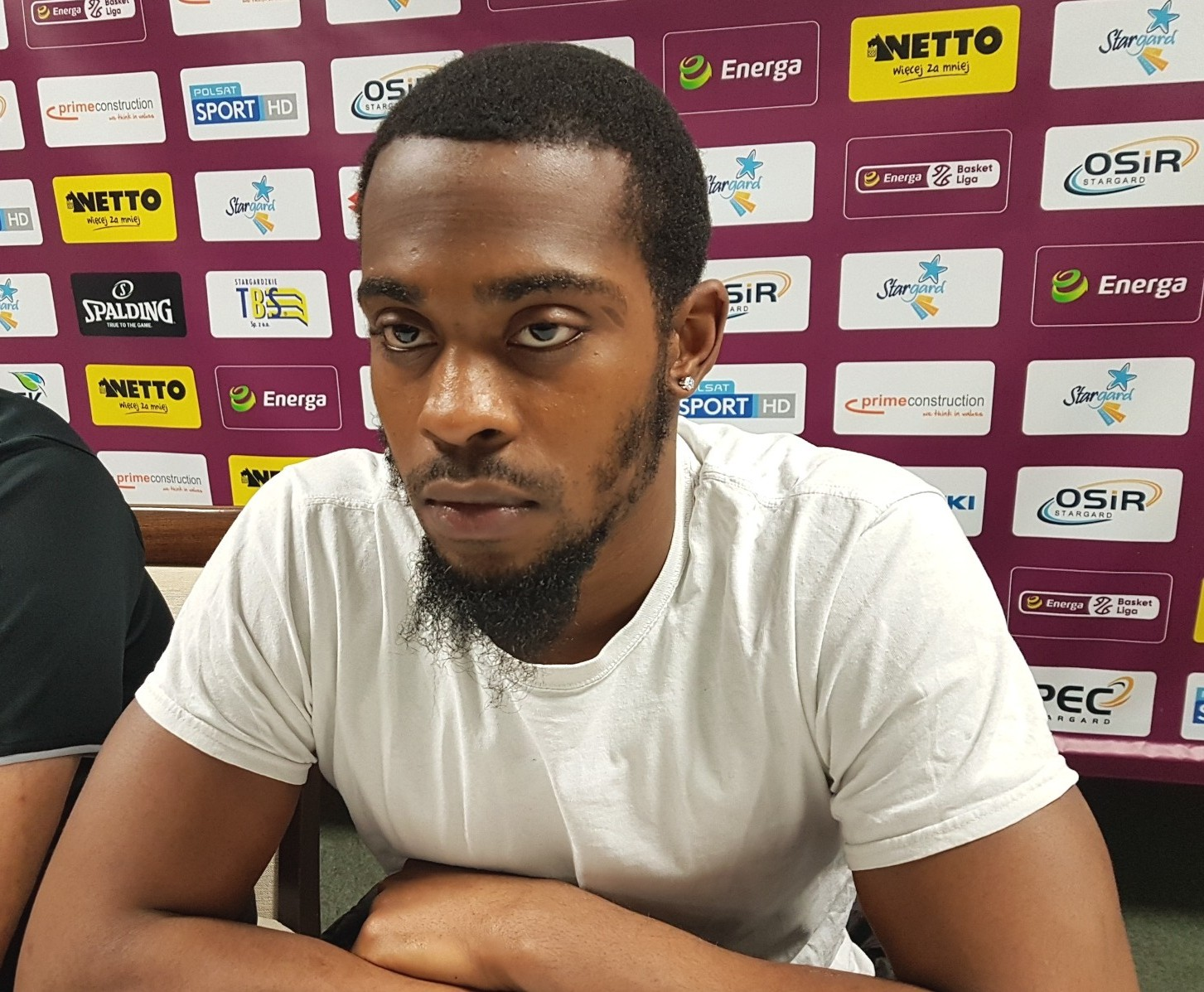
Anthony Hickey

- (United States) Rashid Atkins
- (United States) Anthony Hickey
- (United States) / (Poland) Joe McNaull
- (United States) Shawn Respert
- (United States) Kelvin Upshaw
- (United States) Keith Williams

=== Notable coaches ===
- (Poland) Tadeusz Aleksandrowicz
- (Poland) Grzegorz Chodkiewicz

== Crest ==
The club's crest depicts the medieval Gothic Stargard Mill Gate, one of the most distinctive historic landmarks of Stargard, and also contains the name of the club and the year of its foundation, i.e. 1949.

== Arena ==
This multi-purpose indoor arena was opened in 1989. Basketball games can be watched by 2,500 spectators. Hala Miejska is part of a bigger complex which consists of hotel and restaurant.
