= Tennessee Tech Golden Eagles men's basketball =

American men's college basketball team

2026–27 Tennessee Tech Golden Eagles men's basketball team
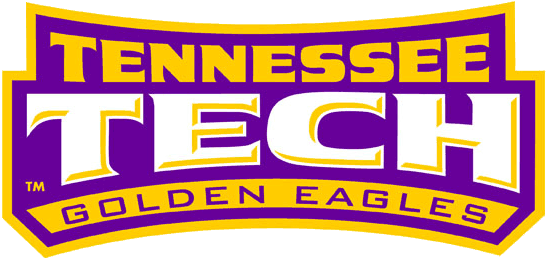
- University: Tennessee Tech University
- First season: 1922–23
- Head coach: Tobin Anderson (1st season)
- Location: Cookeville, Tennessee
- Arena: Hooper Eblen Center (capacity: 9,282)
- Conference: SoCon
- Nickname: Golden Eagles
- Colors: Purple and gold
- Student section: The Nest

NCAA Division I tournament appearances
- 1958, 1963

Conference tournament champions
- 1967

Conference regular-season champions
- 1956, 1958, 1963, 1985, 2001, 2002, 2005

The Tennessee Tech Golden Eagles men's basketball team is the men's basketball team that represents Tennessee Tech in Cookeville, Tennessee, United States. The school's team currently competes in the Southern Conference of NCAA Division I college basketball. Tennessee Tech has fielded a varsity men's basketball team since 1922. The Golden Eagles have appeared twice in the NCAA Tournament, most recently in 1963.

== Postseason results ==
=== NCAA Division I Tournament results ===
The Golden Eagles have appeared in two NCAA Tournaments. Their combined record is 0–2. They have not reached the Tournament in sixty years, the third longest in NCAA Division I Tournament history.

Year	Round	Opponent	Result
1958	Regional Quarterfinals	Notre Dame	L 61–94
1963	Regional Quarterfinals	Loyola–Chicago	L 42–111

=== NIT results ===
The Golden Eagles have appeared in two National Invitation Tournaments (NIT). Their combined record is 3–2.

Year	Round	Opponent	Result
1985	First Round	Tennessee	L 62–65
2002	Opening Round; First Round; Second Round; Quarterfinals	Georgia State; Dayton; Yale; Memphis	W 64–62; W 68–59; W 80–61; L 73–79

=== CIT results ===
The Golden Eagles have appeared in two CollegeInsider.com Postseason Tournaments (CIT). Their combined record is 0–2.

Year	Round	Opponent	Result
2011	First Round	Western Michigan	L 66–74
2012	First Round	Georgia State	L 43–74

=== Vegas 16 results ===
The Golden Eagles have appeared in one Vegas 16. Their record is 0–1.

Year	Round	Opponent	Result
2016	Quarterfinals	Old Dominion	L 59–75

== Players ==
=== Retired jerseys ===
Tennessee Tech has retired four jerseys in program history.

Tennessee Tech Golden Eagles retired jerseys
No.	Player	Years
23	Stephen Kite	1982–1986
32	Earl Wise	1986–1990
40	Kenny Sidwell	1954–1958
42	Jim Hagan	1957–1960

=== Professional players ===
- Anthony Fisher (born 1986), basketball player in the Israeli Basketball Premier League
