= 2015 Polish Basketball Cup =

Polish Basketball Cup
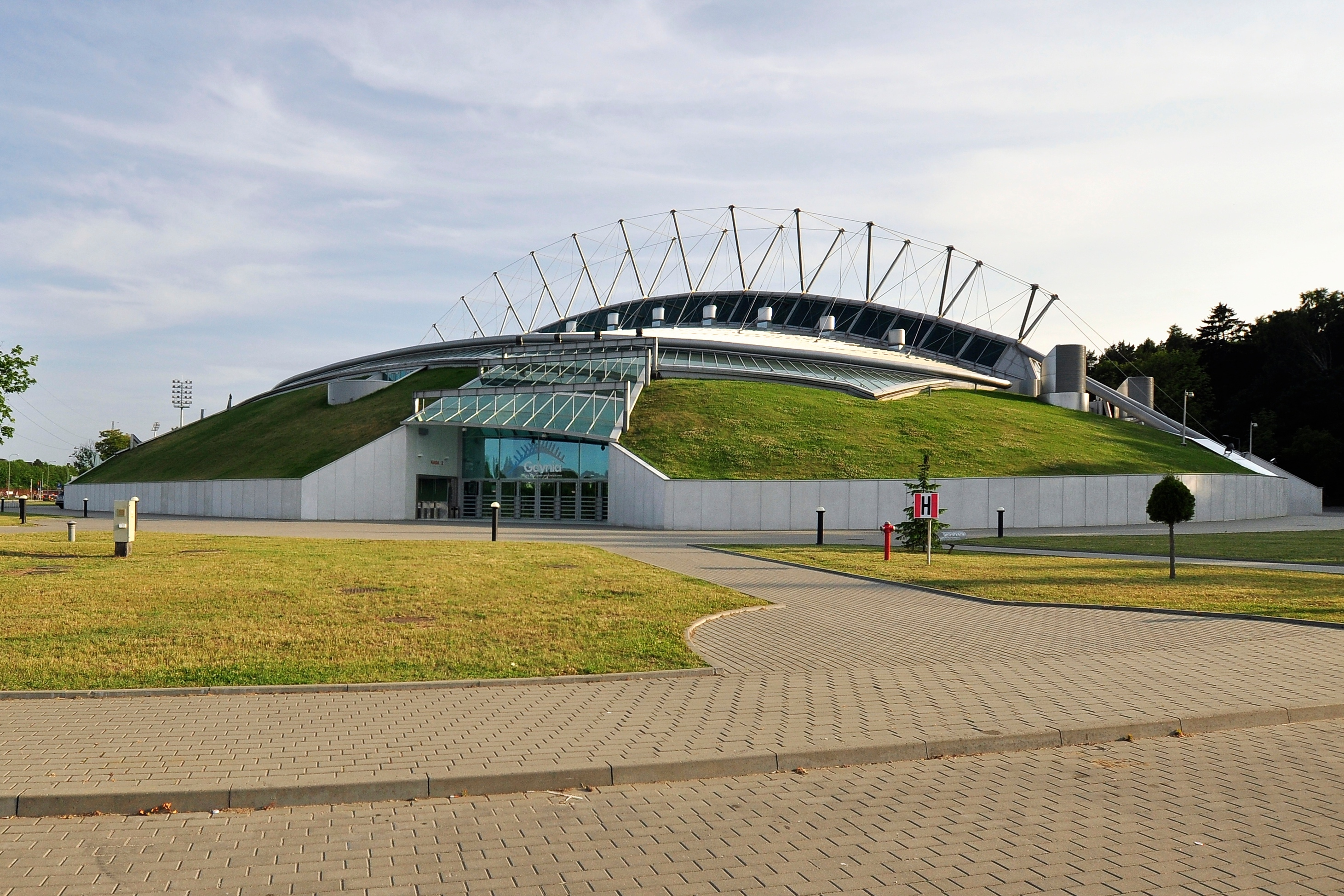
- The Gdynia Sports Arena hosted the tournament
- Season: 2015
- Duration: 19–22 February
- Games played: 7
- Teams: 8

Finals
- Champions: Stelmet Zielona Góra (1st title)
- Runners-up: Rosa Radom

Awards
- MVP: (Poland) Przemysław Zamojski

The 2015 Polish Basketball Cup (Polish: Puchar Polski 2015) was the 52nd edition of Poland's national cup competition for men basketball teams. It was managed by the Polish Basketball League (PLK) and was held in Gdynia, in the Gdynia Sports Arena, in February 2015.

== Qualification ==
Teams who played in European competitions qualified directly, along with hosts Asseco Gdynia. The other five teams were determined by league standings in the 2014–15 PLK season after the first half of the regular season.

== Bracket ==
The draw took place on 19 January 2015.

Quarterfinals; 19–20 February
PGE Turów	83
Energia Czarni Słupsk	84
Asseco Gdynia	75
Rosa Radom	83
Stelmet Zielona Góra	74
Śląsk Wrocław	71
AZS Koszalin	79
Trefl Sopot	72

Semifinals; 21 February
Energia Czarni Słupsk	71
Rosa Radom	78
Stelmet Zielona Góra	87
AZS Koszalin	65

Final; 22 February
Rosa Radom	71
Stelmet Zielona Góra	77

== Final ==
Zielona Góra won the game 71–77 and captured its first Polish Cup title. Zielona Góra's Przemysław Zamojski was named the Final MVP.

17 May 2015	Rosa Radom	71–77	Stelmet Zielona Góra	Gdynia
20:00 CET (UTC+01:00)	Scoring by quarter: 15–17, 28–18, 6–20, 22–22
	Pts: Taylor 19; Rebs: Adams 9 Asts: Four players 2	Boxscore	Pts: Hosley, Robinson 18; Rebs: Cel 8 Asts: Koszarek 7	Arena: Gdynia Sports Arena

Rosa Radom	Zielona Góra

2

Starters:			Pts	Reb	Ast
PG	12	(United States) Danny Gibson	18	0	2
SG	1	(United States) Mike Taylor	19	6	2
SF	15	(Poland) Lukasz Majewski	12	0	2
PF	24	(Poland) Michal Sokolowski	13	5	0
C	32	(United States) Kim Adams	2	9	0
Reserves:					
C	4	(United States) John Turek	0	2	0
SF	8	(Poland) Robert Witka	DNP		
PF	11	(Serbia) Uros Mirkovic	3	1	0
SG	13	(Poland) Jakub Zalweski	0	0	2
SG	22	(Poland) Daniel Szymkiewicz	0	3	1
PF	35	(Poland) Damian Jeszke	4	3	1
Head coach:
(Poland) Wojciech Kaminski

2015 Polish Cup Champions
Stelmet Zielona Góra
1st title

Starters:			Pts	Reb	Ast
PG	55	(Poland) Lukasz Koszarek	8	2	7
SG	35	(Poland) Przemyslaw Zamojski	18	2	0
SF	14	(Georgia (country)) Quinton Hosley	15	5	1
PF	5	(Poland) Aaron Cel	7	8	1
C	34	(Poland) Adam Hrycaniuk	7	2	0
Reserves:					
SG	2	(United States) Russell Robinson	18	1	3
PF	4	(Poland) Patryk Pelka	DNP		
PF	8	(United States) Chevon Troutman	0	0	2
PG	13	(Poland) Kamil Chanas	0	0	0
SF	20	(Poland) Maciej Kucharek	DNP		
C	24	(Croatia) Jure Lalic	4	3	0
Head coach:
(Poland) Andrzej Adamek
