= Łukasz Koszarek =

Polish basketball player (born 1984)

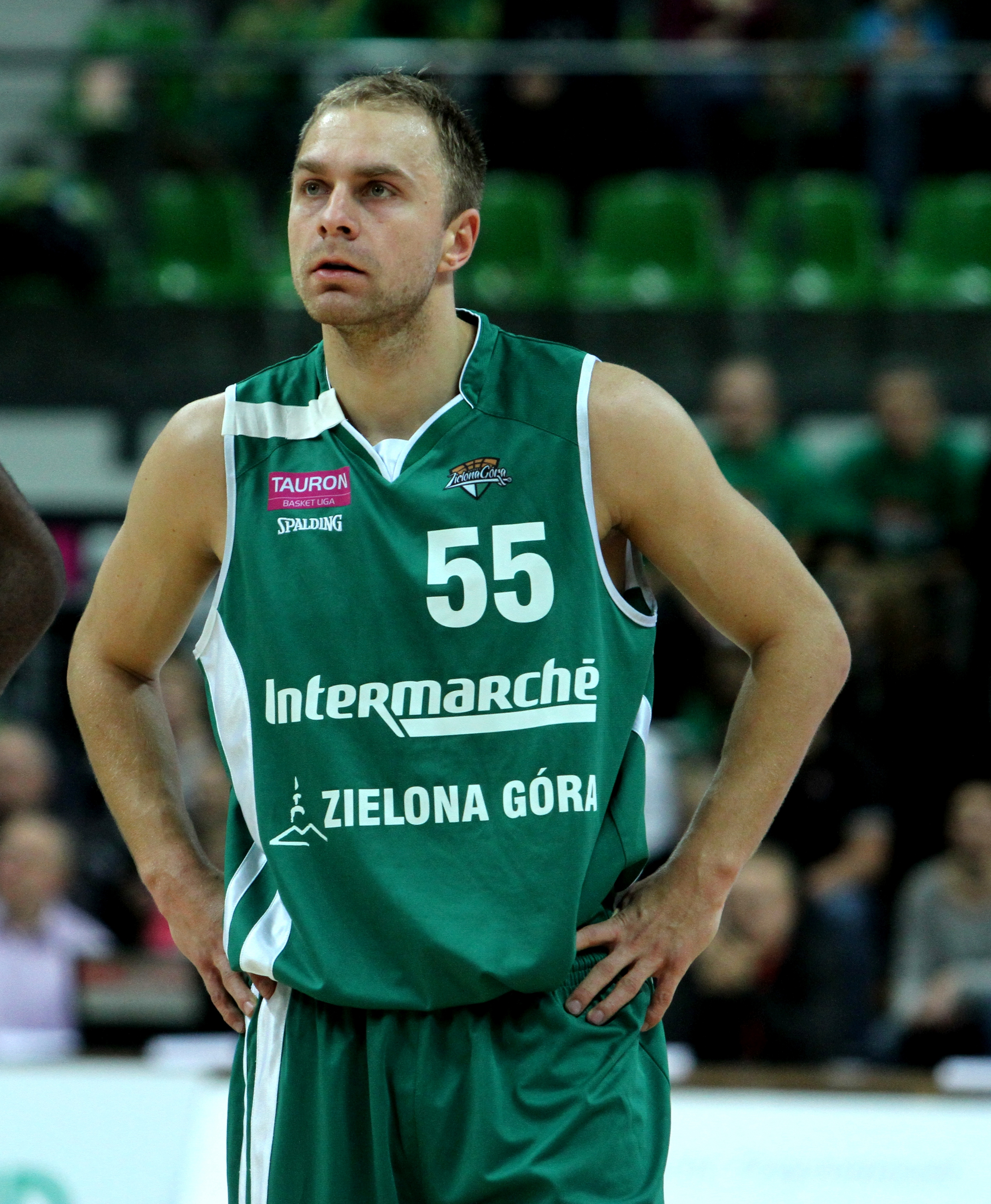
- Koszarek with Zielona Góra in December 2013

Personal information
- Born: 12 January 1984 (age 42) Września, Poland
- Listed height: 1.87 m (6 ft 2 in)
- Listed weight: 91 kg (201 lb)

Career information
- NBA draft: 2006: undrafted
- Playing career: 2003–2023
- Position: Point guard
- Number: 55

Career history
- 2003–2006: Polonia Warszawa
- 2006–2007: Turów Zgorzelec
- 2007–2009: Anwil Włocławek
- 2009–2011: Juvecaserta
- 2011–2012: Trefl Sopot
- 2012–2013: Asseco Prokom
- 2013–2021: Stelmet Zielona Góra
- 2021–2023: Legia Warszawa

Career highlights
- 5× Polish League champion (2013, 2015, 2016, 2017, 2020); 3× PLK Best Polish Player (2012–2014); 3× Polish Cup winner (2012, 2015, 2017); 2× Polish Cup MVP (2012, 2017); 2× Polish Supercup winner (2007, 2015)

Łukasz Koszarek (born 12 January 1984) is a Polish former professional basketball player for. He was a 187 cm (6 ft 2 in) point guard.

== Professional career ==
Koszarek has spent most of his career in the Polish Basketball League. He made his debut for Polonia Warbud Warszawa in 2003–04, seeing limited action off the bench for the team. However, the following year, he saw significantly more action, averaging 11.6 points and 4.8 assists per game in leading the team to a third-place finish in the league.

In 2008–09 season, he averaged 13.9 points and 6.1 assists per game for fourth-place Anwil Włocławek. After a successful season in Anwil, he moved to Italy and signed a two-year contract with JuveCaserta, where he was just a backup point guard and didn’t see much playing time. In his last season abroad he averaged 4.9 points, 1.6 rebounds and 1.5 assists.

He came back to Poland in the summer of 2011, when he signed a contract with Trefl Sopot. In the 2011–12 season Koszarek was voted the MVP of the league and led Trefl to finals, where they lost to Asseco Prokom. Koszarek finished the season averaging 15.5 points, 3.7 rebounds and 5.4 assists per game.

The 2012–13 season Koszarek started in Asseco Prokom, but after the club struggled with financial problems, he moved to Zielona Góra in the middle of the season and won his first Polish championship title playing for Stelmet. After that season he signed a multi-year contract with the club. Koszarek re-signed with the team on 20 July 2020.

On 31 May 2021 he signed with Legia Warszawa of the Polish Basketball League.

== International career ==
Koszarek is also a member of the Polish national basketball team. He was selected to the national team for the first time at EuroBasket 2007. He was also selected to play for the host Polish team at the EuroBasket 2009, where he ranked fifth on the team in points, fourth in rebounds, and second in assists.

He also played at EuroBasket 2011, EuroBasket 2013, EuroBasket 2015, and EuroBasket 2017.

He was also a member of the Polish national team at Basketball World Cup 2019 in China, where he averaged 2.5 points, 0.8 rebounds and 2.5 assists in 14 minutes per game.

== Honours ==
=== Club ===
Anwil Wloclawek

- Polish Supercup Winner: 2007

Trefl Sopot

- Polish Cup Winner: 2012

Zielona Góra

- Polish PLK Champion: 2012–13, 2014–15, 2015–16, 2016–17, 2019–20
- Polish Cup Winner: 2015, 2017
- Polish Supercup Winner: 2015

=== Individual ===
- 3× PLK Best Polish Player: 2011–12, 2012–13, 2013–14
- 2× Polish Cup MVP: 2012, 2017

== Career statistics ==
Legend
GP	Games played	GS	Games started	MPG	Minutes per game
FG%	Field-goal percentage	3P%	3-point field-goal percentage	FT%	Free-throw percentage
RPG	Rebounds per game	APG	Assists per game	SPG	Steals per game
BPG	Blocks per game	PPG	Points per game	PIR	Performance index rating
**Bold**	Career high

=== EuroLeague ===
Year	Team	GP	GS	MPG	FG%	3P%	FT%	RPG	APG	SPG	BPG	PPG	PIR
2012–13	Asseco Prokom	**10**	9	29.9	**.420**	**.366**	**.903**	2.9	4.0	**1.1**	**.1**	**11.1**	**11.6**
2013–14	Zielona Góra	**10**	**10**	**31.3**	.378	.314	.857	**3.8**	**5.8**	.4	**.1**	8.5	8.9
Career		20	19	30.6	.398	.342	.895	3.4	4.9	.8	.1	9.8	10.2
