= 2014–15 PLK season =

Tauron Basket Liga^{1}
- Games played: 271
- Teams: 16 ▲ ^{+4}

Regular season
- Season MVP: (Poland) Damian Kulig

Finals
- Champions: Stelmet Zielona Góra; 2nd title
- Runners-up: PGE Turów Zgorzelec
- Third place: Energa Czarni Słupsk
- Fourth place: Rosa Radom
- Finals MVP: (Georgia (country)) Quinton Hosley

Awards
- Best Defender: (Georgia (country)) Quinton Hosley
- Best Polish Player: (Poland) Damian Kulig
- Best Coach: (Poland) Wojciech Kamiński

Statistical leaders
| Points | (United States) Dominique Johnson | 23.0 |
| Rebounds | (United States) Darrell Harris | 11.6 |
| Assists | (United States) Jerel Blassingame | 7.9 |

Records
- Highest scoring: (United States) Myles McKay (40)
- Highest attendance: Stelmet Zielona Góra (av. 3,866)
- Lowest attendance: Jezioro Tarnobrzeg (av. 616)
- Average attendance: 2,034
- ^{1} Sponsored league name, referring to Tauron.

The 2014–15 Polish Basketball League – for sponsorship reasons the Tauron Basket Liga – was the 81st season of the highest professional basketball tier in Poland and the 19th since the foundation of the Polish Basketball League.

The league champion qualified for the 2015–16 Euroleague regular season.

== Teams ==
| Team | Location | Stadium | Capacity |
|---|---|---|---|
| WTK Anwil Włocławek | Włocławek | Hala Mistrzów | 4,200 |
| AZS Koszalin | Koszalin | Hala Widowiskowo-Sportowa | 3,000 |
| Asseco Gdynia | Gdynia | Gdynia Sports Arena | 5,500 |
| PGE Turów Zgorzelec | Zgorzelec | PGE Turów Arena | 3,500 |
| Rosa Radom | Radom | ZSE Radom | 1,200 |
| Stelmet Zielona Góra | Zielona Góra | CRS Hall | 6,080 |
| Trefl Sopot | Sopot | Ergo Arena | 15,000 |
| WKS Śląsk Wrocław | Wrocław | Hala Orbita | 3,000 |
| Energa Czarni Słupsk | Słupsk | Hala Gryfia | 3,200 |
| Jezioro Tarnobrzeg | Tarnobrzeg | Hala OSiR Wisła | 1,500 |
| Polpharma Starogard Gdański | Starogard Gdański | Argo-Kociewie | 2,500 |
| Wilki Morskie Szczecin ^{WC} | Szczecin | Azoty Arena | 7,403 |
| Polfarmex Kutno ^{P} | Kutno | Hala SP9 | 1,200 |
| Polski Cukier Toruń ^{WC} | Toruń | Arena Toruń | 6,248 |
| MKS Dąbrowa Górnicza ^{WC} | Dąbrowa Górnicza | Hala Centrum | 2,944 |
| Start Lublin ^{WC} | Lublin | Hala Globus | 5,000 |

Notes
^P Promoted to the highest tier.
^WC Teams that received wild card invitations from the league.

== Regular season ==
| Pos | Team | Pld | W | L | PF | PA | PD | Qualification or relegation |
|---|---|---|---|---|---|---|---|---|
| 1 | PGE Turów Zgorzelec | 30 | 23 | 7 | 2759 | 2461 | +298 | Qualified for Playoffs |
| 2 | Stelmet Zielona Góra | 30 | 23 | 7 | 2349 | 2122 | +227 | Qualified for Playoffs |
| 3 | AZS Koszalin | 30 | 22 | 8 | 2526 | 2256 | +270 | Qualified for Playoffs |
| 4 | Energa Czarni Słupsk | 30 | 21 | 9 | 2354 | 2228 | +126 | Qualified for Playoffs |
| 5 | Śląsk Wrocław | 30 | 21 | 9 | 2354 | 2228 | +126 | Qualified for Playoffs |
| 6 | Rosa Radom | 30 | 21 | 9 | 2386 | 2134 | +252 | Qualified for Playoffs |
| 7 | Asseco Gdynia | 30 | 16 | 14 | 2295 | 2282 | +13 | Qualified for Playoffs |
| 8 | Trefl Sopot | 30 | 14 | 16 | 2455 | 2435 | +20 | Qualified for Playoffs |
| 9 | Polski Cukier Toruń | 30 | 14 | 16 | 2428 | 2317 | +111 | |
| 10 | Polfarmex Kutno | 30 | 13 | 17 | 2287 | 2364 | −77 | |
| 11 | Dąbrowa Górnicza | 30 | 10 | 20 | 2456 | 2585 | −129 | |
| 12 | Anwil Włocławek | 30 | 10 | 20 | 2253 | 2440 | −187 | |
| 13 | Wilki Morskie Szczecin | 30 | 9 | 21 | 2389 | 2588 | −199 | |
| 14 | Start Lublin | 30 | 9 | 21 | 2300 | 2536 | −236 | |
| 15 | Starogard Gdański | 30 | 7 | 23 | 2441 | 2767 | −326 | |
| 16 | Jezioro Tarnobrzeg | 30 | 7 | 23 | 2394 | 2727 | −333 | |

=== Results ===
| Home \ Away | DAB | GDY | KOS | KUT | LUB | RAD | SOP | STA | SZC | SLU | TAR | TOR | WRO | WLO | ZGO | ZIE |
|---|---|---|---|---|---|---|---|---|---|---|---|---|---|---|---|---|
| MKS Dąbrowa Górnicza | | 75–72 | 94–99 | 88–99 | 104–95 | 57–72 | 67–83 | 94–93 | 85–94 | 74–79 | 95–96 | 80–92 | 87–78 | 74–85 | 86–92 | 63–76 |
| Asseco Gdynia | 74–71 | | 72–64 | 73–82 | 89–74 | 65–77 | 89–81 | 81–73 | 88–79 | 84–79 | 81–93 | 65–57 | 67–60 | 100–65 | 86–78 | 72–68 |
| AZS Koszalin | 88–79 | 86–70 | | 95–63 | 80–66 | 87–69 | 88–60 | 82–90 | 98–73 | 76–68 | 102–75 | 89–74 | 69–64 | 89–64 | 78–89 | 72–71 |
| Polfarmex Kutno | 80–86 | 86–80 | 76–70 | | 88–72 | 76–71 | 66–69 | 80–62 | 70–65 | 68–86 | 77–62 | 70–80 | 71–76 | 78–71 | 70–83 | 66–68 |
| Start Lublin | 80–74 | 72–64 | 70–87 | 80–91 | | 67–81 | 77–87 | 81–97 | 76–87 | 82–73 | 79–65 | 75–62 | 70–91 | 77–91 | 68–75 | 73–86 |
| Rosa Radom | 96–78 | 80–72 | 81–85 | 86–59 | 75–50 | | 73–62 | 102–60 | 122–78 | 78–87 | 71–64 | 76–73 | 84–65 | 77–71 | 90–73 | 73–62 |
| Trefl Sopot | 84–87 | 65–77 | 61–90 | 90–83 | 111–94 | 76–80 | | 119–115 | 79–84 | 68–85 | 79–81 | 97–82 | 93–95 | 72–60 | 66–74 | 81–77 |
| Polpharma Starogard Gdański | 77–81 | 85–79 | 72–90 | 92–83 | 84–91 | 72–91 | 77–95 | | 95–86 | 86–91 | 89–79 | 84–73 | 87–100 | 65–88 | 110–126 | 75–103 |
| Wilki Morskie Szczecin | 80–86 | 69–67 | 69–75 | 68–92 | 82–86 | 75–94 | 96–93 | 100–82 | | 94–101 | 92–73 | 73–86 | 68–86 | 77–78 | 88–94 | 70–76 |
| Energa Czarni Słupsk | 80–71 | 90–83 | 84–76 | 76–59 | 71–68 | 74–71 | 65–70 | 90–85 | 82–50 | | 73–70 | 77–76 | 63–67 | 85–71 | 67–85 | 72–70 |
| Jezioro Tarnobrzeg | 101–109 | 78–87 | 83–118 | 85–86 | 90–93 | 69–85 | 56–95 | 108–105 | 95–85 | 72–83 | | 81–123 | 105–91 | 83–75 | 83–119 | 87–90 |
| Polski Cukier Toruń | 86–71 | 71–75 | 89–96 | 105–84 | 84–62 | 74–61 | 93–85 | 107–65 | 87–90 | 63–79 | 78–61 | | 66–63 | 85–74 | 70–80 | 62–71 |
| WKS Śląsk Wrocław | 96–92 | 80–65 | 73–66 | 78–68 | 100–75 | 81–70 | 95–81 | 91–48 | 82–73 | 69–74 | 97–73 | 84–80 | | 91–72 | 101–99 | 69–68 |
| WTK Anwil Włocławek | 77–90 | 58–67 | 63–84 | 87–66 | 85–89 | 71–82 | 56–87 | 95–93 | 71–74 | 76–70 | 82–78 | 78–76 | 82–89 | | 86–81 | 74–77 |
| PGE Turów Zgorzelec | 90–81 | 101–85 | 103–68 | 91–89 | 98–82 | 78–59 | 103–104 | 88–67 | 118–102 | 87–80 | 117–83 | 86–90 | 92–76 | 97–89 | | 92–79 |
| Stelmet Zielona Góra | 91–77 | 85–66 | 91–79 | 69–61 | 84–76 | 73–59 | 70–62 | 93–56 | 71–68 | 79–70 | 71–65 | 85–84 | 80–70 | 87–58 | 78–70 | |

Legend: Blue = home team win; Red = away team win.

== Playoffs ==
Quarterfinals
1 | PGE Turów | 3
8 | Trefl Sopot | 0
4 | Energa Czarni Słupsk | 3
5 | Śląsk Wrocław | 0
3 | AZS Koszalin | 0
6 | Rosa Radom | 3
2 | Stelmet Zielona Góra | 3
7 | Asseco Gdynia | 1

Semifinals
1 | PGE Turów | 3
4 | Energa Czarni Słupsk | 1
2 | Stelmet Zielona Góra | 3
6 | Rosa Radom | 0

Finals
1 | PGE Turów | 2
2 | Stelmet Zielona Góra | 4
Third place
4 | Energa Czarni Słupsk | 2
6 | Rosa Radom | 1

Stelmet Zielona Góra 2014–15 PLK Champions

- 2 Robinson
- 4 Pelka
- 5 Cel
- 8 Troutman
- 9 Zywert
- 13 Chanas
- 14 Hosley
- 20 Kucharek
- 24 Lalic
- 34 Hrycaniuk
- 35 Zamojski
- 55 Koszarek
- Head coach: Filipovski

== Statistical leaders ==
=== Points ===
| Pos | Player | Club | PPG |
|---|---|---|---|
| 1 | (United States) Dominique Johnson | Jezioro Tarnobrzeg | 23.0 |
| 2 | (United States) Anthony Miles | Starogard Gdański | 19.7 |
| 3 | (United States) Kwamain Mitchell | Starogard Gdański | 19.4 |

=== Rebounds ===
| Pos | Player | Club | RPG |
|---|---|---|---|
| 1 | (United States) Darrell Harris | Wilki Morskie Szczecin | 11.6 |
| 2 | (United States) Kevin Johnson Jr. | Starogard Gdański | 10.3 |
| 3 | (Lithuania) Ovidijus Galdikas | Asseco Gdynia | 10.0 |

=== Assists ===
| Pos | Player | Club | APG |
|---|---|---|---|
| 1 | (United States) Jerel Blassingame | Energa Czarni Słupsk | 7.4 |
| 2 | (United States) William Franklin | Polski Cukier Toruń | 7.3 |
| 3 | (United States) Josh Miller | Jezioro Tarnobrzeg | 5.8 |

== Awards ==
- MVP: (Poland) Damian Kulig – PGE Turów Zgorzelec
- Finals MVP: (Georgia (country)) Quinton Hosley – Stelmet Zielona Góra
- Best Defender: (Georgia (country)) Quinton Hosley – Stelmet Zielona Góra
- Best Coach: (Poland) Wojciech Kamiński – Rosa Radom
- Best Polish Player: (Poland) Damian Kulig – PGE Turów Zgorzelec
- All-PLK Team:

(Georgia (country)) Quinton Hosley – Stelmet Zielona Góra
(United States) Jerel Blassingame – Energa Czarni Słupsk
(Poland) Karol Gruszecki – Energa Czarni Słupsk
(Poland) Aaron Cel – Stelmet Zielona Góra
(Poland) Damian Kulig – PGE Turów Zgorzelec

== Polish clubs in European competitions ==
| Team | Competition | Progress |
|---|---|---|
| PGE Turow Zgorzelec | Euroleague | Regular season |
| PGE Turow Zgorzelec | Eurocup | Eigtfinals |
| Stelmet Zielona Gora | Eurocup | Regular season |
