= 2016–17 PLK season =

Polska Liga Koszykówki
- Season: 2016–17
- Duration: 9 October 2016 – 26 April 2017 (Regular season)
- Teams: 17

Regular season
- Top seed: Anwil Włocławek
- Season MVP: (Saint Vincent and the Grenadines) Shawn King
- Relegated: Siarka Tarnobrzeg; Polfarmex Kutno

Finals
- Champions: Stelmet Zielona Góra; 4th title
- Runners-up: Polski Cukier Toruń
- Third place: Stal Ostrów Wielkopolski
- Fourth place: Energa Czarni Słupsk
- Finals MVP: (United States) James Florence

Statistical leaders
Points	(Poland) Krzysztof Szubarga	18.0
Rebounds	(Saint Vincent and the Grenadines) Shawn King	10.8
Assists	(United States) Aaron Johnson	7.0

The 2016–17 Polish Basketball League was the 83rd season of the highest professional basketball tier in Poland and the 21st since the foundation of the Polish Basketball League.

== Teams ==
As finishing in one of the two last positions during the two previous seasons, Siarka Tarnobrzeg lost its right to participate in the PLK. However, the club was invited to join the league.

As champion of the previous I Liga, Miasto Szkła Krosno was promoted.

After the ejection of Śląsk Wrocław, the league was played by 17 teams. The intention of PLK is to reduce the number of clubs in the PLK to 16 and to eliminate contracts by introducing regular promotions and relegations. For this season, three teams will be relegated to the I Liga.

Location of teams in 2016–17 PLK

Team	Location	Stadium	Capacity
Asseco Gdynia	Gdynia	Gdynia Sports Arena	5,500
AZS Koszalin	Koszalin	Hala Widowiskowo-Sportowa	3,000
Energa Czarni Słupsk	Słupsk	Hala Gryfia	3,200
BM Slam Stal Ostrów Wielkopolski	Ostrów Wielkopolski	Hala Sportowa Stal	1,200
MKS Dąbrowa Górnicza	Dąbrowa Górnicza	Centrum Hall	2,944
PGE Turów Zgorzelec	Zgorzelec	PGE Turów Arena	3,500
Polfarmex Kutno	Kutno	Hala SP9	1,200
Polski Cukier Toruń	Toruń	Arena Toruń	6,248
Rosa Radom	Radom	ZSE Radom	1,200
Siarka Tarnobrzeg	Tarnobrzeg	Hala OSiR Wisła	1,500
Polpharma Starogard Gdański	Starogard Gdański	Argo-Kociewie	2,500
Miasto Szkła Krosno	Krosno	MOSiR Krosno	1,380
Stelmet Zielona Góra	Zielona Góra	CRS Hall	6,080
TBV Start Lublin	Lublin	Hala Globus	5,000
Trefl Sopot	Sopot	Ergo Arena	15,000
Wilki Morskie Szczecin	Szczecin	Azoty Arena	7,403
WTK Anwil Włocławek	Włocławek	Hala Mistrzów	4,200

== Regular season ==
Pos	Team	Pld	W	L	PF	PA	PD	Pts	Qualification or relegation
1	Anwil Włocławek	32	25	7	2572	2307	+265	57	Qualification to playoffs
2	Stelmet Zielona Góra	32	23	9	2513	2259	+254	55	Qualification to playoffs
3	BM Slam Stal Ostrów Wielkopolski	32	21	11	2448	2307	+141	53	Qualification to playoffs
4	Polski Cukier Toruń	32	21	11	2602	2485	+117	53	Qualification to playoffs
5	Rosa Radom	32	21	11	2390	2270	+120	53	Qualification to playoffs
6	MKS Dąbrowa Górnicza	32	20	12	2538	2354	+184	52	Qualification to playoffs
7	Polpharma Starogard Gdański	32	19	13	2459	2401	+58	51	Qualification to playoffs
8	Energa Czarni Słupsk	32	19	13	2482	2394	+88	51	Qualification to playoffs
9	Trefl Sopot	32	18	14	2510	2479	+31	50	
10	PGE Turów Zgorzelec	32	17	15	2665	2487	+178	49	
11	King Szczecin	32	16	16	2591	2546	+45	48	
12	Miasto Szkła Krosno	32	15	17	2392	2425	−33	47	
13	Asseco Gdynia	32	10	22	2486	2669	−183	42	
14	AZS Koszalin	32	9	23	2288	2471	−183	41	
15	TBV Start Lublin	32	8	24	2312	2613	−301	40	
16	Siarka Tarnobrzeg	32	5	27	2281	2739	−458	37	Relegation to I Liga
17	Polfarmex Kutno	32	5	27	2170	2463	−293	37	Relegation to I Liga

Source: PLK

== Playoffs ==
Quarter-finals
1 Anwil Włocławek	72	72	71	76	62
8 Energa Czarni Słupsk	82	70	68	83	67
4 Polski Cukier Toruń	105	87	90
5 Rosa Radom	98	78	89
2 Stelmet Zielona Góra	82	95	63	77
7 Polpharma Starogard Gdański	71	80	65	74
3 Stal Ostrów Wielkopolski	84	81	85
6 Dąbrowa Górnicza	76	75	76

Semi-finals
8 Energa Czarni Słupsk	72	76	52
4 Polski Cukier Toruń	78	83	65
2 Stelmet Zielona Góra	94	89	78	57	95
3 Stal Ostrów Wielkopolski	88	74	92	58	71

Final
4 Polski Cukier Toruń	69	66	84	78	82
2 Stelmet Zielona Góra	88	87	74	81	88

Third place
3 Stal Ostrów Wielkopolski	86	76
8 Energa Czarni Słupsk	83	67

== Polish teams in European competitions ==
Club	Competition	Result
Stelmet Enea Zielona Góra	Champions League	Regular season
Rosa Radom	Champions League	Regular season
Stelmet Enea Zielona Gora	FIBA Europe Cup	Top 32
