= Aaron Cel =

French-Polish basketball player (born 1987)

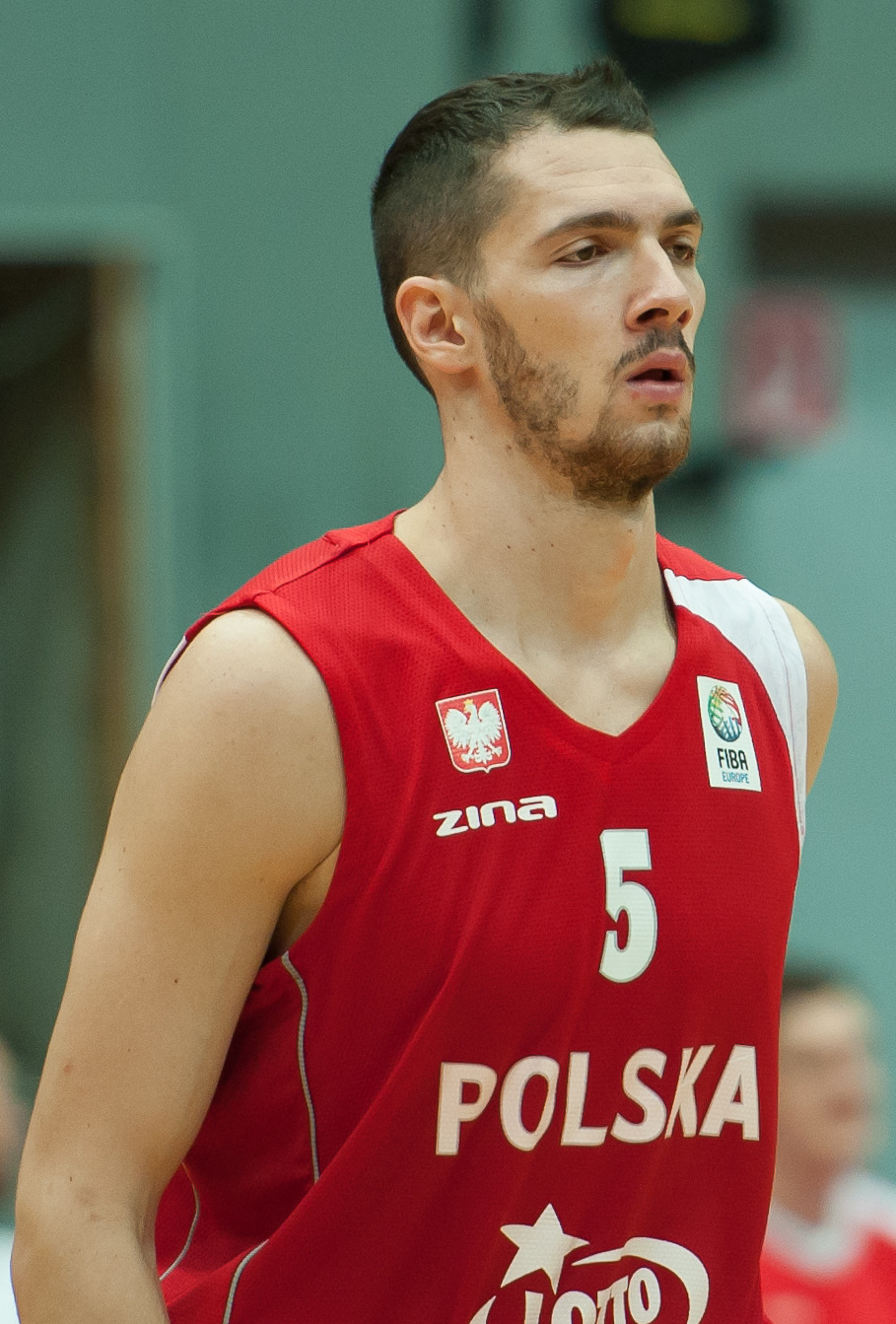
- Cel with the Polish national team in 2014

Personal information
- Born: March 4, 1987 (age 39) Orléans, France
- Listed height: 2.03 m (6 ft 8 in)
- Listed weight: 97 kg (214 lb)

Career information
- NBA draft: 2009: undrafted
- Playing career: 2005–2024
- Position: Power forward
- Number: 5

Career history
- 2005–2007: Le Mans
- 2007–2009: Étendard de Brest
- 2009–2010: Boulazac Dordogne
- 2010–2011: Hermine Nantes
- 2011–2013: Turów Zgorzelec
- 2013–2015: Stelmet Zielona Góra
- 2015–2016: Monaco
- 2016–2017: BCM Gravelines
- 2017–2024: Polski Cukier Toruń

Career highlights
- French League champion (2006); Polish League champion (2015); 2× Polish Cup winner (2015, 2018); 3× All-Polish League Team (2015, 2018, 2019); VTB United League Top Polish Player (2013)

Aaron Cel (born March 4, 1987) is a French-Polish former professional basketball player. After ending his playing career he became the sports director and board member of Legia Warsaw.

== Professional career ==
Cel made his professional debut with Le Mans in the French Pro A League. He later played with Brest, Boulazac and Nantes in the French Pro B League. In the summer of 2011, he signed with Polish team Turów Zgorzelec. After he spent two seasons with them in June 2013, he signed with Stelmet Zielona Góra. In July 2015, he returned to France and signed with AS Monaco Basket. For the 2016–17 season he moved to French club BCM Gravelines. On August 6, 2017, he signed with Polish club Polski Cukier Toruń.

After the end of 2023–24 season, he announced his retirement from professional basketball. On May 17, 2024, he became the sports director and a board member of Legia Warsaw.

== National team career ==
Cel represented the French national basketball team at junior level. He later acquired Polish citizenship and started to play for the Polish national basketball team. With Poland he played at the EuroBasket 2015.
