= 2015–16 PLK season =

Tauron Basket Liga^{1}
- Season: 2015–16
- Teams: 17

Regular season
- Season MVP: (Poland) Mateusz Ponitka

Finals
- Champions: Stelmet Zielona Góra (3rd title)
- Runners-up: Rosa Radom
- Third place: Energa Czarni Słupsk
- Fourth place: Anwil Włocławek
- Finals MVP: (United States) Dee Bost

Statistical leaders
Points	(United States) Jarvis Williams	17.2
Rebounds	(United States) Kirk Archibeque	9.8
Assists	(United States) Jerel Blassingame	6.1
- ^{1} Sponsored league name, referring to Tauron.

The 2015–16 Polish Basketball League, for sponsorship reasons the Tauron Basket Liga, was the 82nd season of the highest professional basketball tier in Poland and the 20th since the foundation of the Polish Basketball League.

== Teams ==
- Promoted from the 2014–15 1 Liga:
  - BM Slam Stal Ostrów Wielkopolski (1st)
Location of teams in 2015–16 PLK

Team	Location	Stadium	Capacity
Asseco Gdynia	Gdynia	Gdynia Sports Arena	5,500
AZS Koszalin	Koszalin	Hala Widowiskowo-Sportowa	3,000
Energa Czarni Słupsk	Słupsk	Hala Gryfia	3,200
BM Slam Stal Ostrów Wielkopolski ^{P}	Ostrów Wielkopolski	Hala Sportowa Stal	1,200
MKS Dąbrowa Górnicza	Dąbrowa Górnicza	Hala Centrum	2,944
PGE Turów Zgorzelec	Zgorzelec	PGE Turów Arena	3,500
Polfarmex Kutno	Kutno	Hala SP9	1,200
Polski Cukier Toruń	Toruń	Arena Toruń	6,248
Rosa Radom	Radom	ZSE Radom	1,200
Siarka Tarnobrzeg	Tarnobrzeg	Hala OSiR Wisła	1,500
Polpharma Starogard Gdański	Starogard Gdański	Argo-Kociewie	2,500
WKS Śląsk Wrocław	Wrocław	Hala Orbita	3,000
Start Lublin	Lublin	Hala Globus	5,000
Stelmet Zielona Góra	Zielona Góra	CRS Hall	6,080
Trefl Sopot	Sopot	Ergo Arena	15,000
Wilki Morskie Szczecin	Szczecin	Azoty Arena	7,403
WTK Anwil Włocławek	Włocławek	Hala Mistrzów	4,200

Notes
^P Promoted from the 1 Liga.

== Regular season ==
Pos	Team	Pld	W	L	PF	PA	PD	Pts	Qualification or relegation
1	Stelmet Zielona Góra	32	28	4	2656	2179	+477	60	Qualification to playoffs
2	Rosa Radom	32	25	7	2439	2226	+213	57	Qualification to playoffs
3	Anwil Włocławek	32	24	8	2509	2221	+288	56	Qualification to playoffs
4	Polski Cukier Toruń	32	24	8	2514	2280	+234	56	Qualification to playoffs
5	Energa Czarni Słupsk	32	23	9	2575	2341	+234	55	Qualification to playoffs
6	King Wilki Morskie Szczecin	32	18	14	2596	2529	+67	50	Qualification to playoffs
7	Polfarmex Kutno	32	18	14	2272	2225	+47	50	Qualification to playoffs
8	Asseco Gdynia	32	17	15	2309	2383	−74	49	Qualification to playoffs
9	PGE Turów Zgorzelec	32	16	16	2674	2631	+43	48	
10	MKS Dąbrowa Górnicza	32	14	18	2382	2400	−18	46	
11	Polpharma Starogard Gdański	32	13	19	2342	2400	−58	45	
12	AZS Koszalin	32	13	19	2284	2436	−152	45	
13	BM Slam Stal Ostrów Wielkopolski	32	12	20	2297	2434	−137	44	
14	WKS Śląsk Wrocław	32	8	24	2285	2511	−226	40	
15	Trefl Sopot	32	8	24	2167	2332	−165	40	
16	Siarka Tarnobrzeg	32	7	25	2253	2557	−304	39	
17	Start Lublin	32	4	28	2154	2623	−469	36	

Source: PLK

== Playoffs ==
=== Bracket ===
Quarterfinals
1	Stelmet Zielona Góra	3
8	Asseco Gdynia	0
4	Polski Cukier Toruń	1
5	Energa Czarni Słupsk	3
3	Anwil Włocławek	3
6	King Wilki Morskie Szczecin	1
2	Rosa Radom	3
7	Polfarmex Kutno	0

Semifinals
1	Stelmet Zielona Góra	3
5	Energa Czarni Słupsk	0
3	Anwil Włocławek	1
2	Rosa Radom	3

Finals
1	Stelmet Zielona Góra	4
2	Rosa Radom	0
Third place
5	Anwil Włocławek	0
3	Energa Czarni Słupsk	2

=== Quarter-finals ===
Team 1	Agg.	Team 2	Game 1	Game 2	Game 3	Game 4	Game 5
Stelmet Zielona Góra	3–0	Asseco Gdynia	91–57	81–53	92–55		
Polski Cukier Toruń	1–3	Energa Czarni Słupsk	87–90	86–71	71–84	83–94	
Anwil Włocławek	3–1	King Wilki Morskie Szczecin	78–54	86–71	88–93	83–75 (OT)	
Rosa Radom	3–0	Polfarmex Kutno	76–66	63–56	73–68		

=== Semi-finals ===
Team 1	Agg.	Team 2	Game 1	Game 2	Game 3	Game 4	Game 5
Stelmet Zielona Góra	3–0	Energa Czarni Słupsk	93–73	87–67	77–61		
Rosa Radom	3–1	Anwil Włocławek	58–64	82–65	71–56	75–61	

=== Third-position play-off ===
Team 1	Agg.	Team 2	Game 1	Game 2	Game 3
Anwil Włocławek	0–2	Energa Czarni Słupsk	54–59	62–78	

=== Finals ===
Team 1	Agg.	Team 2	Game 1	Game 2	Game 3	Game 4	Game 5	Game 6	Game 7
Stelmet Zielona Góra	4–0	Rosa Radom	86–80 (OT)	70–51	65–53	64–53			

== Awards ==
=== Most Valuable Player ===
Player	Team	Ref.
(Poland) Mateusz Ponitka	Stelmet Zielona Góra	

=== Finals MVP ===
Player	Team	Ref.
(United States) Dee Bost	Stelmet Zielona Góra	

=== Best Defender ===
Player	Team	Ref.
(Poland) Michał Sokołowski	Rosa Radom	

=== Best Polish Player ===
Player	Team	Ref.
(Poland) Mateusz Ponitka	Stelmet Zielona Góra	

=== Best Coach ===
Player	Team	Ref.
(Slovenia) Sašo Filipovski	Stelmet Zielona Góra	

== Statistical leaders ==
Final statistical leaders after the Regular Season.

=== Efficiency ===
Pos	Player	Club	PIR
1	(United States) Jarvis Williams	Śląsk Wrocław	20.3
2	(United States) Zach Robbins	Siarka Tarnobrzeg	19.0
3	(United States) Kirk Archibeque	PGE Turów Zgorzelec	18.4

=== Points ===
Pos	Player	Club	PPG
1	(United States) Jarvis Williams	Śląsk Wrocław	17.24
2	(Cameroon) Danny Gibson	Twarde Pierniki Toruń	17.22
3	(Poland) Michael Hicks	Starogard Gdański	17.19
4	(Czech Republic) David Jelinek	Anwil Włocławek	17.1

=== Rebounds ===
Pos	Player	Club	RPG
1	(United States) Kirk Archibeque	PGE Turów Zgorzelec	9.8
2	(United States) Michael Fraser	Polfarmex Kutno	9.6
3	(United States) Kevin Johnson Jr.	Polfarmex Kutno	9.5

=== Assists ===
Pos	Player	Club	APG
1	(United States) Jerel Blassingame	Energa Czarni Słupsk	6.1
2	(Cameroon) Danny Gibson	Polski Cukier Toruń	5.9
3	(Australia) Daniel Dillon	PGE Turów Zgorzelec	5.7

== Polish clubs in European competitions ==
Team	Competition	Progress
Stelmet Zielona Gora	Euroleague	Regular season
Stelmet Zielona Gora	Eurocup	Quarterfinals
PGE Turow Zgorzelec	FIBA Europe Cup	Regular season
Slask Wroclaw	FIBA Europe Cup	Top 32
Rosa Radom	FIBA Europe Cup	Top 32
