= Mateusz Ponitka =

Polish basketball player (born 1993)

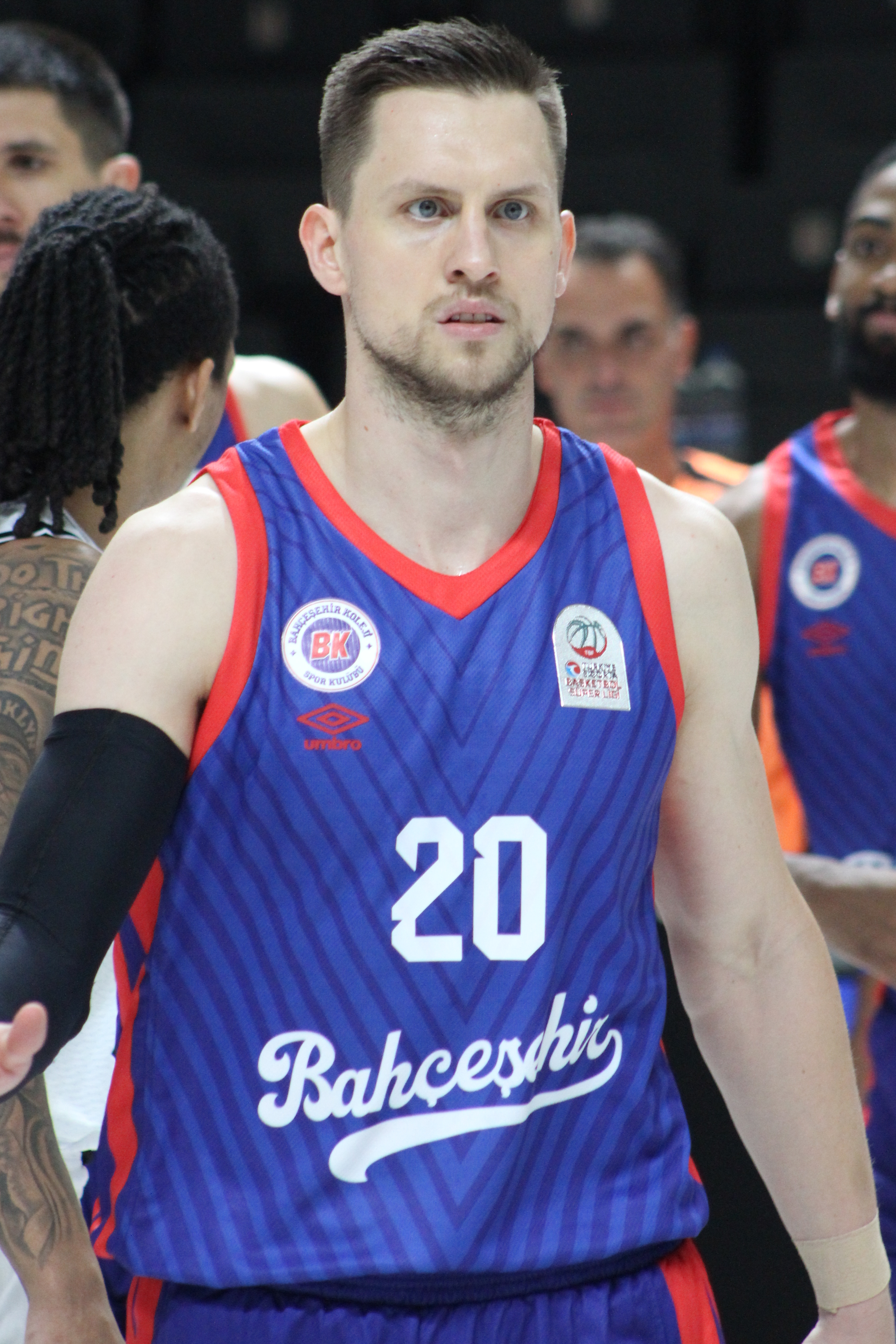
- Ponitka with Bahçeşehir Koleji

No. 38 – Bahçeşehir Koleji
- Position: Small forward / point guard
- League: Basketbol Süper Ligi

Personal information
- Born: 29 August 1993 (age 33) Ostrów Wielkopolski, Poland
- Listed height: 6 ft 6 in (1.98 m)
- Listed weight: 206 lb (93 kg)

Career information
- NBA draft: 2015: undrafted
- Playing career: 2009–present

Career history
- 2009–2012: AZS Warsaw University of Technology
- 2012–2013: Asseco Prokom
- 2013–2015: Oostende
- 2015–2016: Zielona Góra
- 2016–2017: Karşıyaka
- 2017–2018: Canarias
- 2018–2019: Lokomotiv Kuban
- 2019–2022: Zenit Saint Petersburg
- 2022: Reggio Emilia
- 2022–2023: Panathinaikos
- 2023–2024: Partizan
- 2024–present: Bahçeşehir Koleji

Career highlights
- EuroCup Rising Star (2016); All-EuroCup Second Team (2016); FIBA Intercontinental Cup champion (2017); All-Liga ACB Second Team (2018); All-VTB United League Second Team (2019); 2× Belgian League champion (2014, 2015); 2× Polish League champion (2012, 2016); Polish League MVP (2016); All-Polish PLK Team (2016); Polish Supercup MVP (2015); Polish Supercup winner (2015); Turkish League All-Star (2017)
Medals
Men's basketball
Representing Poland
U17 World Championship
Silver medal – second place	2010 Germany

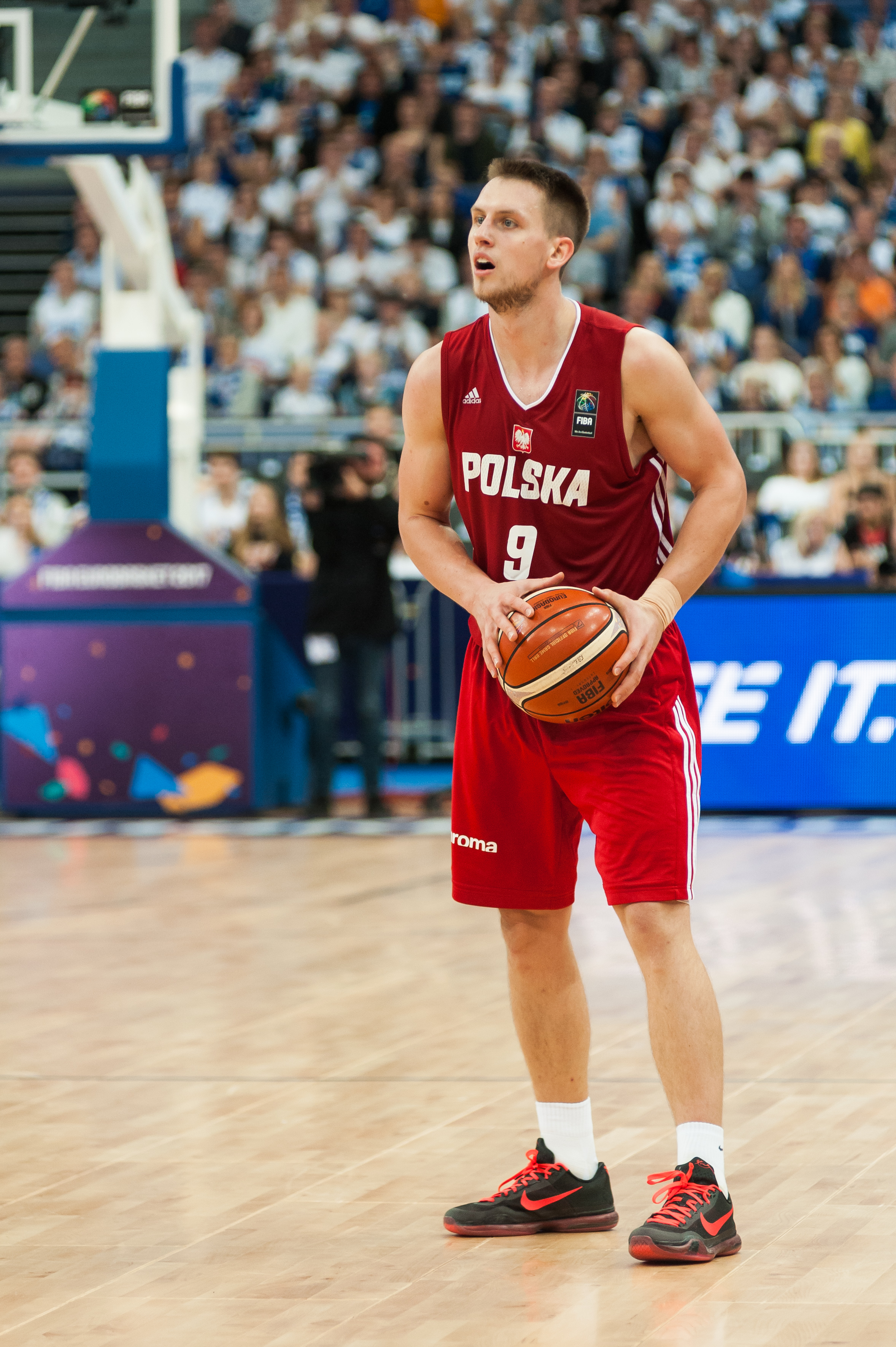
Ponitka with Poland during EuroBasket 2017

Mateusz Ponitka (born 29 August 1993) is a Polish professional basketball player for Bahçeşehir Koleji of the Turkish Basketbol Süper Ligi (BSL). He also represents the senior Poland national team in international competitions. Standing at a height of 6 ft 6 in (1.98 m), he plays at the small forward position.

His brother Marcel Ponitka is also a professional basketball player who capped for the Poland national team.

== Professional career ==
=== Early years ===
Ponitka started playing basketball in UKS Kasprowiczanka Ostrow Wielkopolski, before moving in 2009 to AZS Warsaw University of Technology. In his first season as a professional player, he appeared in 27 games of the Polish 2nd-tier League, averaging 7.1 points, 3.5 rebounds and 1.2 steals in 18 minutes per game. He also appeared in four games of the Polish Cup, averaging 9 points per game. In September 2010, Ponitka took part in the Basketball Without Borders camp, held in Barcelona. He was named the MVP of the camp.

In the 2010–11 season, he had a bigger role in the team, which reflected on his stats. In April 2011, he took part in Nike Hoop Summit held in Portland, Oregon. He was the leading scorer of the World Select Team with 17 points in a 92–80 loss to the USA Team. Over the season, he averaged 11.7 points, 4.7 rebounds and 1.6 steals over 34 games. His team eventually won the championship, this way promoting to the Polish League in the following season.

In the 2011–12 season, due to his good performances, he was voted for the Polish League All-Star game with the most votes. In the game, he was the third scorer in his team with 13 points. In his final season with AZS Warsaw University of Technology, he averaged 13.6 points and 4.6 rebounds.

=== Asseco Prokom ===
On 27 March 2012, Ponitka signed a three-year deal with the Polish team Asseco Prokom. He also had an option to leave the team after two seasons. In the new team, his minutes were very limited, and the player had the averages of 2.6 points and 1.4 rebounds for the rest of the season. However, his team won the Polish League championship, by defeating Trefl Sopot with 78–67 in the final series. In the 2012–13 season, his role in the team increased, as he averaged 8.6 points and 4.2 rebounds per game over the season. He also played in the EuroLeague, averaging 8.8 points and 3.5 rebounds over 10 games.

=== Telenet Oostende ===
On 4 August 2013, he signed a three-year contract with the Belgian team Telenet Oostende. In the 2013–14 and 2014–15 season his team won the Belgian League championship.

He went undrafted in the 2015 NBA draft.

=== Zielona Góra ===
On 4 August 2015, he signed a contract with the Polish team Stelmet Zielona Góra. Ponitka was named the EuroCup Rising Star of the 2015–16 season.

=== Pınar Karşıyaka ===
On 8 August 2016, he signed a two-year deal with Turkish club Pınar Karşıyaka.

=== Lokomotiv Kuban ===
On 13 July 2018, he signed with Russian club Lokomotiv Kuban.

=== Zenit ===
On 4 July 2019, Ponitka signed a two-year contract with Zenit Saint Petersburg. In his debut season with the club, Ponitka averaged 9.1 points and 4.6 rebounds over 18 EuroLeague games, in a season that was cut short due to COVID-19 pandemic. In second season with the club, he averaged 8.4 points, career-high 3.2 assists and 5.2 rebounds per game.

Ponitka stayed for 2021–22 season with the club as well. Although his playing time stayed the same, his scoring dropped by half almost and he finished the EuroLeague season with averages of 4.6 points, 2.6 assists and 5.2 rebounds over 20 games.

=== Pallacanestro Reggiana ===
On 17 August 2022, he signed a three-month deal with an option until the end of the season with Reggio Emilia of the Italian Lega Basket Serie A (LBA). However, he did not stay more than a month with the club.

=== Panathinaikos ===
On 23 September 2022, Ponitka signed a one-year deal with Panathinaikos of the Greek Basket League and the EuroLeague. In a total of 27 EuroLeague games (6 starts), he averaged 8.4 points, 5.2 rebounds, 2.4 assists, 1.1 steals and 1.9 turnovers, playing around 25 minutes per contest. Additionally, in 29 domestic league matches, he averaged 9.6 points, 4.3 rebounds, 3.1 assists, 1 steal and 2.4 turnovers, playing around 23 minutes per contest. On 5 July 2023, he parted ways with the Greek club.

=== Partizan ===
On 13 July 2023, Ponitka signed a two-year contract with the Serbian powerhouse Partizan Belgrade. Over 2023–24 season, Ponitka averaged career-low 2.4 points and 2.2 rebounds over 26 EuroLeague games. The season was deemed to be unsuccessful for Partizan as they finished the season without lifting any trophy. On June 29, 2024, he announced he was parting ways with Partizan.

=== Bahçeşehir Koleji ===
On 23 July 2024, he signed with Bahçeşehir Koleji of the Turkish Basketbol Süper Ligi (BSL). He renewed his contract with the team on 28 June 2025, signing a new one-year deal.

== National team career ==
Ponitka was part of the Poland U-17 national basketball team which took the silver medal at the 2010 FIBA Under-17 World Championship held in Germany. In the final game, he scored 14 points against the United States, but his team lost by huge margin, 111–80. He played against athletes like Bradley Beal, Michael Kidd-Gilchrist, James Michael McAdoo, Andre Drummond, Quinn Cook, Marquis Teague and others. He was named to the All-Tournament Team.

In 2011, he was part of the U-18 team which took sixth place at the 2011 FIBA Europe Under-18 Championship held in Poland. Over nine tournament games, he averaged 15.3 points, 7.6 rebounds and 1.6 assists per game.

He officially debuted for the senior national team on 3 August 2012, in the friendly game against Montenegro. Even he played for nearly 23 minutes, he scored just 4 points. He was a member of the team at the 2013 FIBA EuroBasket held in Slovenia. He averaged 3.6 points and 1.4 rebounds over five tournament games.

He represented the Polish national team at the 2015 FIBA EuroBasket and 2017 FIBA EuroBasket. He also participated in the 2019 FIBA World Cup, where he scored 26 points against China. Down one, Ponitka came up with a key steal on Chinese star Zhou Qi with 3 seconds left, being fouled in the process and sending the game into overtime, where Poland would later triumph in an upset 79–76 overtime win over the hosts.

Ponitka played at EuroBasket 2017, where he averaged 12.8 points and 7.2 rebounds per game, while Poland did not advance past the preliminary round.

Ponitka returned at EuroBasket 2022 for Poland. In the quarter-finals against heavily favoured Slovenia, he guided Poland to a 90–87 upset win to reach the first semi-finals in 51 years. Ponitka finished with 26 points, 16 rebounds and 10 assists to become the fourth player in EuroBasket history to record a triple-double.

== Career statistics ==
Legend
GP	Games played	GS	Games started	MPG	Minutes per game
FG%	Field-goal percentage	3P%	3-point field-goal percentage	FT%	Free-throw percentage
RPG	Rebounds per game	APG	Assists per game	SPG	Steals per game
BPG	Blocks per game	PPG	Points per game	PIR	Performance index rating
**Bold**	Career high

=== EuroLeague ===
Year	Team	GP	GS	MPG	FG%	3P%	FT%	RPG	APG	SPG	BPG	PPG	PIR
2012–13	Gdynia	10	4	22.2	.486	.323	.381	3.5	.8	1.0	.0	8.8	7.8
2015–16	Zielona Góra	10	10	**31.5**	**.505**	.250	.676	**7.9**	2.2	**1.1**	**.2**	**12.0**	**17.9**
2019–20	Zenit	18	15	24.3	.492	.324	.708	4.6	1.6	.8	.3	9.1	12.2
2020–21	Zenit	**34**	**26**	26.0	.484	.306	.785	5.2	**3.2**	1.0	.1	8.4	14.1
2021–22	Zenit	20	18	25.7	.414	.269	.583	5.2	2.6	.6	.1	4.6	9.6
2022–23	Panathinaikos	27	6	25.2	.434	**.372**	.802	5.2	2.4	**1.1**	.1	8.4	13.0
2023–24	Partizan	26	14	13.9	.410	.238	**.889**	2.2	.7	.4	.0	2.4	3.1
Career		145	93	23.5	.465	.308	.734	4.7	2.1	.9	.1	7.2	10.9

=== EuroCup ===
Year	Team	GP	GS	MPG	FG%	3P%	FT%	RPG	APG	SPG	BPG	PPG	PIR
2013–14	Oostende	15	2	20.3	.476	.355	.625	3.2	1.7	1.0	.1	8.9	9.4
2014–15	Oostende	16	14	19.6	.477	.333	.667	3.6	1.3	.9	.3	8.3	8.8
2015–16	Zielona Góra	10	10	**29.8**	.562	**.476**	.694	**6.5**	**2.1**	1.1	**.4**	**13.5**	**17.3**
2018–19	Lokomotiv Kuban	**18**	**16**	25.1	**.575**	.364	**.827**	4.8	1.7	**1.2**	**.4**	9.6	13.9
Career		59	42	23.2	.521	.372	.717	4.4	1.6	1.0	.3	9.7	11.9

=== Basketball Champions League ===
Year	Team	GP	GS	MPG	FG%	3P%	FT%	RPG	APG	SPG	BPG	PPG
2016–17	Karşıyaka	**19**	**18**	**28.2**	.462	**.367**	.707	**4.7**	1.7	**1.3**	**.4**	10.8
2017–18	Canarias	16	16	22.0	**.514**	.333	**.800**	3.7	**2.1**	.9	.1	**11.1**
Career		35	34	25.3	.483	.354	.756	4.3	1.9	1.1	.3	10.9

=== Domestic leagues ===
Year	Team	League	GP	MPG	FG%	3P%	FT%	RPG	APG	SPG	BPG	PPG
2009–10	(Poland) Politechnika	I Liga	27	19.0	.458	.373	.609	3.6	.6	1.3	.2	7.4
2010–11	(Poland) Politechnika	I Liga	34	25.4	.429	.301	.609	4.7	1.4	1.6	.1	11.7
2011–12	(Poland) Politechnika	PLK	30	25.4	.533	.294	.671	4.6	1.3	1.4	.3	13.6
2011–12	(Poland) Gdynia	PLK	16	8.9	.515	.375	.286	1.4	.2	.3	.1	2.6
2012–13	(Poland) Gdynia	PLK	34	20.8	.410	.272	.707	4.2	.6	.8	.3	8.7
2013–14	(Belgium) Oostende	PBL	43	19.6	.449	.364	.653	2.9	1.2	1.6	.1	9.7
2014–15	(Belgium) Oostende	PBL	38	21.6	.525	.375	.702	3.2	1.5	1.1	.3	12.7
2015–16	(Poland) Zielona Góra	PLK	41	23.4	.523	.383	.761	5.2	2.7	1.1	.2	10.5
2016–17	(Turkey) Karşıyaka	TBSL	28	31.2	.502	.297	.708	4.7	2.2	1.7	.2	13.2
2017–18	(Spain) Canarias	ACB	33	25.2	.552	.273	.784	5.6	1.4	.8	.1	13.7
2018–19	(Russia) Lokomotiv Kuban	VTBUL	29	24.4	.638	.407	.750	4.7	2.0	.9	.1	9.4
2019–20	(Russia) Zenit	VTBUL	13	20.3	.507	.348	.750	4.1	1.7	.4	.1	8.1
2020–21	(Russia) Zenit	VTBUL	19	21.6	.552	.410	.652	3.7	2.4	1.2	.2	8.6
2021–22	(Russia) Zenit	VTBUL	11	21.7	.436	.429	.607	3.5	4.6	1.0	—	5.2
2022–23	(Greece) Panathinaikos	GBL	27	23.3	.519	.375	.752	4.4	3.1	1.0	.1	9.8
2023–24	(Serbia) Partizan	KLS	4	22.5	.615	.571	.667	2.7	2.7	1.0	.2	7.5
2023–24	(Serbia) Partizan	ABA	29	16.9	.596	.421	.846	3.3	1.7	.9	.0	6.1

=== National team ===
Tournament	Pos.	GP	PPG	RPG	APG
EuroBasket 2013	21st	5	3.6	1.4	0.2
EuroBasket 2015	11th	6	9.3	4.0	3.7
EuroBasket 2017	18th	5	12.8	7.2	2.6
World Cup 2019	8th	8	13.5	6.8	1.6
EuroBasket 2022	4th	9	13.4	5.3	5.7
EuroBasket 2025	TBD				

== See also ==
- Sport in Poland
- List of Polish basketball players
