= ULEB Cup 2007–08 Regular Season Group I =

These are the Group I Standings and Results:

Key to colors
Top three places in each group, plus five highest-ranked four-places teams, advance to Top 32
Eliminated

== Standings ==
	Team	Pld	W	L	PF	PA	Diff
1.	(Poland) PGE Turów Zgorzelec	10	8	2	743	695	48
2.	(Croatia) Zadar	10	6	4	850	761	89
3.	(Russia) UNICS Kazan	10	5	5	799	732	67
4.	(Israel) Hapoel Jerusalem	10	5	5	820	856	-36
5.	(Netherlands) EiffelTowers	10	3	7	788	863	-75
6.	(France) Strasbourg	10	3	7	688	781	-93

== Results/Fixtures ==
All times given below are in Central European Time.

=== Game 1 ===
November 6, 2007

November 6
17:00

UNICS Kazan (Russia)	90–87 (OT)	(Croatia) Zadar
Scoring by quarter: 22-18, 22-17, 19-19, 15-24, 12-9

Kazan

November 6
18:00

Hapoel Jerusalem (Israel)	74–73	(France) Strasbourg
Scoring by quarter: 17-24, 19-9, 17-2, 21-18

Jerusalem

November 6
18:30

Turów Zgorzelec (Poland)	80–65	(Netherlands) EiffelTowers
Scoring by quarter: 22-12, 23-20, 18-10, 17-23

Zgorzelec

=== Game 2 ===
November 13, 2007

November 13
19:00

Zadar (Croatia)	85–74	(Poland) Turów Zgorzelec
Scoring by quarter: 21-25, 21-17, 17-14, 26-18

Zadar

November 13
20:00

EiffelTowers (Netherlands)	101–94	(Israel) Hapoel Jerusalem
Scoring by quarter: 25-25, 26-21, 23-28, 27-20

Den Bosch

November 13
20:30

Strasbourg (France)	78–66	(Russia) UNICS Kazan
Scoring by quarter: 24-19, 22-14, 20-15, 12-18

Strasbourg

=== Game 3 ===
November 20, 2007

November 20
18:30

Turów Zgorzelec (Poland)	66–42	(France) Strasbourg
Scoring by quarter: 13-14, 21-9, 13-11, 19-8

Zgorzelec

November 20
19:30

Hapoel Jerusalem (Israel)	107–68	(Russia) UNICS Kazan
Scoring by quarter: 23-13, 29-12, 21-18, 34-25

Jerusalem

November 20
20:00

EiffelTowers (Netherlands)	93–83	(Croatia) Zadar
Scoring by quarter: 31-25, 22-19, 19-13, 21-26

Den Bosch

=== Game 4 ===
November 27, 2007

November 27
17:00

UNICS Kazan (Russia)	75–80	(Poland) Turów Zgorzelec
Scoring by quarter: 21-25, 17-16, 16-14, 21-25

Kazan

November 27
18:00

Hapoel Jerusalem (Israel)	84–83	(Croatia) Zadar
Scoring by quarter: 27-22, 23-21, 13-18, 21-22

Jerusalem

November 27
20:30

Strasbourg (France)	97–85	(Netherlands) EiffelTowers
Scoring by quarter: 33-17, 21-29, 23-18, 20-21

Strasbourg

=== Game 5 ===
December 4, 2007

December 4
18:30

Turów Zgorzelec (Poland)	78–68	(Israel) Hapoel Jerusalem
Scoring by quarter: 15-19, 15-18, 25-12, 23-19

Zgorzelec

December 4
19:00

Zadar (Croatia)	94–65	(France) Strasbourg
Scoring by quarter: 22-17, 27-9, 20-18, 25-21

Zadar

December 4
20:00

EiffelTowers (Netherlands)	79–108	(Russia) UNICS Kazan
Scoring by quarter: 11-30, 23-16, 16-28, 29-34

Den Bosch

=== Game 6 ===
December 11, 2007

December 11
19:00

Zadar (Croatia)	76–64	(Russia) UNICS Kazan
Scoring by quarter: 26-21, 12-15, 20-9, 18-19

Zadar

December 11
20:00

EiffelTowers (Netherlands)	70–77	(Poland) Turów Zgorzelec
Scoring by quarter: 12-22, 21-11, 21-24, 16-20

Den Bosch

December 11
20:30

Strasbourg (France)	81–72	(Israel) Hapoel Jerusalem
Scoring by quarter: 23-21, 14-13, 18-19, 26-19

Strasbourg

=== Game 7 ===
December 18, 2007

December 18
17:00

UNICS Kazan (Russia)	94–57	(France) Strasbourg
Scoring by quarter: 24-10, 21-18, 22-18, 27-11

Kazan

December 18
18:00

Hapoel Jerusalem (Israel)	112–97	(Netherlands) EiffelTowers
Scoring by quarter: 27-26, 34-15, 27-31, 24-25

Jerusalem

December 18
18:30

Turów Zgorzelec (Poland)	77–72 (OT)	(Croatia) Zadar
Scoring by quarter: 23-25, 22-10, 13-17, 5-11, 14-9

Zgorzelec

=== Game 8 ===
January 8, 2008

January 8
17:00

UNICS Kazan (Russia)	98–45	(Israel) Hapoel Jerusalem
Scoring by quarter: 26-14, 20-11, 26-14, 26-6

Kazan

January 8
19:00

Zadar (Croatia)	84–65	(Netherlands) EiffelTowers
Scoring by quarter: 24-16, 16-18, 25-17, 19-14

Zadar

January 8
20:30

Strasbourg (France)	61–64	(Poland) Turów Zgorzelec
Scoring by quarter: 14-17, 21-12, 16-14, 10-21

Strasbourg

=== Game 9 ===
January 15, 2008

January 15
18:30

Turów Zgorzelec (Poland)	73–68	(Russia) UNICS Kazan
Scoring by quarter: 15-16, 17-15, 15-21, 26-16

Zgorzelec

January 15
19:00

Zadar (Croatia)	103–75	(Israel) Hapoel Jerusalem
Scoring by quarter: 33-17, 26-15, 18-19, 26-24

Zadar

January 15
20:00

EiffelTowers (Netherlands)	83–60	(France) Strasbourg
Scoring by quarter: 26-17, 22-16, 19-5, 16-22

Den Bosch

=== Game 10 ===
January 22, 2008

January 22
19:00

UNICS Kazan (Russia)	68–50	(Netherlands) EiffelTowers
Scoring by quarter: 15-14, 20-5, 12-13, 21-18

Kazan

January 22
19:00

Strasbourg (France)	74–83	(Croatia) Zadar
Scoring by quarter: 20-15, 21-16, 8-22, 25-30

Strasbourg

January 22
19:00

Hapoel Jerusalem (Israel)	89–74	(Poland) Turów Zgorzelec
Scoring by quarter: 26-20, 23-12, 22-21, 18-21

Jerusalem
