= Russell Robinson =

American basketball player

Free agent
- Position: Point guard

Personal information
- Born: January 24, 1986 (age 40) Bronx, New York, U.S.
- Listed height: 6 ft 1 in (1.85 m)
- Listed weight: 196 lb (89 kg)

Career information
- High school: Rice (New York City, New York)
- College: Kansas (2004–2008)
- NBA draft: 2008: undrafted
- Playing career: 2008–present

Career history
- 2008: Erdemirspor
- 2008–2010: Reno Bighorns
- 2010: Maine Red Claws
- 2010–2011: DKV Joventut
- 2011–2012: Trabzonspor
- 2012–2013: Angelico Biella
- 2013: Turów Zgorzelec
- 2014: Champville
- 2014: Austin Spurs
- 2014–2015: Stelmet Zielona Góra
- 2015–2016: Kavala
- 2016–2017: Wilki Morskie Szczecin
- 2017–2018: Rabotnički
- 2018–2019: Levski Lukoil

Career highlights
- Macedonian League champion (2018); Macedonian League Finals MVP (2018); Polish League champion (2015); Polish Cup winner (2015); NCAA champion (2008); Big 12 All-Defensive Team (2006); Fourth-team Parade All-American (2004)

Russell Robinson Jr. (born January 24, 1986) is an American professional basketball player who last played for Levski Lukoil of the NBL. He played college basketball for the University of Kansas where he won an NCAA championship in 2008. He has previously played in Spain, Turkey, Italy, Poland and Lebanon.

== Early years ==
Robinson was born to Thearesa Watson and Russell Robinson Sr. in the Bronx, New York. Robinson attended Rice High School in New York City, where he was coached by Maurice Hicks. As a junior, he led his team with 18 points, six rebounds, four assists and four steals per game. His senior year, he averaged 22 points and eight rebounds. During his senior year, he was the New York Newsday Manhattan Player of the Year, a New York Daily News All-City Team selection, a CHSAA All-City Team honoree, and a fourth-team Parade All-American.

== College career ==
In his four-year college career at Kansas, Robinson played 134 games (107 starts) while averaging 7.1 points, 2.6 rebounds, 3.7 assists and 1.8 steals in 24.8 minutes per game. As a sophomore in 2005–06, he earned Big 12 All-Defensive team honors, and as a senior in 2007–08, he helped Kansas win the 2008 NCAA championship.

== Professional career ==
=== 2008–09 season ===
After going undrafted in the 2008 NBA draft, Robinson joined the Houston Rockets for the 2008 NBA Summer League where he averaged 3.3 points and 1.7 rebounds in three games. He later joined Erdemirspor of Turkey where he played for them during Erdemirspor's three-day basketball tournament. He left them following the tournament and returned to the United States.

On November 7, 2008, Robinson was selected by the Reno Bighorns in the second round of the 2008 NBA Development League Draft. In 50 games (35 starts) for Reno during 2008–09, he averaged 12.3 points, 2.8 rebounds, 4.4 assists and 2.1 steals per game.

=== 2009–10 season ===
In July 2009, Robinson joined the Orlando Magic for the 2009 NBA Summer League. On September 3, 2009, he joined Team NBA for the 2009 NBA Asia Challenge held in Seoul, South Korea and Manila, Philippines. On September 28, 2009, he signed with the Cleveland Cavaliers. However, he was later waived by the Cavaliers on October 22, 2009.

In November 2009, Robinson was reacquired by the Bighorns. On January 28, 2010, he was traded to the Maine Red Claws.

=== 2010–11 season ===
In July 2010, Robinson joined the Indiana Pacers for the Orlando Summer League and the NBA D-League Select Team for the Las Vegas Summer League. On August 3, 2010, he signed a one-year deal with DKV Joventut of the Liga ACB.

=== 2011–12 season ===
On August 13, 2011, Robinson signed a one-year deal with JSF Nanterre of the LNB Pro A. However, he later parted ways with Nanterre on September 30, 2011, before playing in a game for them.

In November 2011, Robinson signed with Trabzonspor for the rest of the 2011–12 season.

=== 2012–13 season ===
On July 26, 2012, Robinson signed a one-year deal Angelico Biella of the Lega Basket Serie A. In January 2013, he left Biella and signed with Turów Zgorzelec of Poland for the rest of the season.

=== 2013–14 season ===
On July 25, 2013, Robinson signed with Stelmet Zielona Góra of Poland for the 2013–14 season. On December 1, 2013, he parted ways with Zielona Góra before playing in a game for them. On January 24, 2014, he signed with Champville SC for the 2014 Lebanese Division A season. He five games before leaving the team in February 2014.

=== 2014–15 season ===
On November 1, 2014, Robinson was acquired by the Austin Spurs. On December 3, 2014, he was waived by the Spurs. On December 31, 2014, he signed a 10-day contract with Stelmet Zielona Góra of the Polish Basketball League. On January 13, 2015, he re-signed with Zielona Góra for the rest of the season.

=== 2015–16 season ===
On October 30, 2015, Robinson signed with Greek club Kavala. In early January 2016, he left Kavala after appearing in nine games. On January 11, 2016, he signed with Polish club Wilki Morskie Szczecin for the rest of the season.

=== 2016–17 season ===
On May 19, 2016, Robinson re-signed with Wilki Morskie Szczecin for the 2016–17 season.

=== 2017–18 season ===
On October 13, 2017, Robinson signed with Macedonian club Rabotnički.
