= Jerel Blassingame =

American basketball player (born 1981)

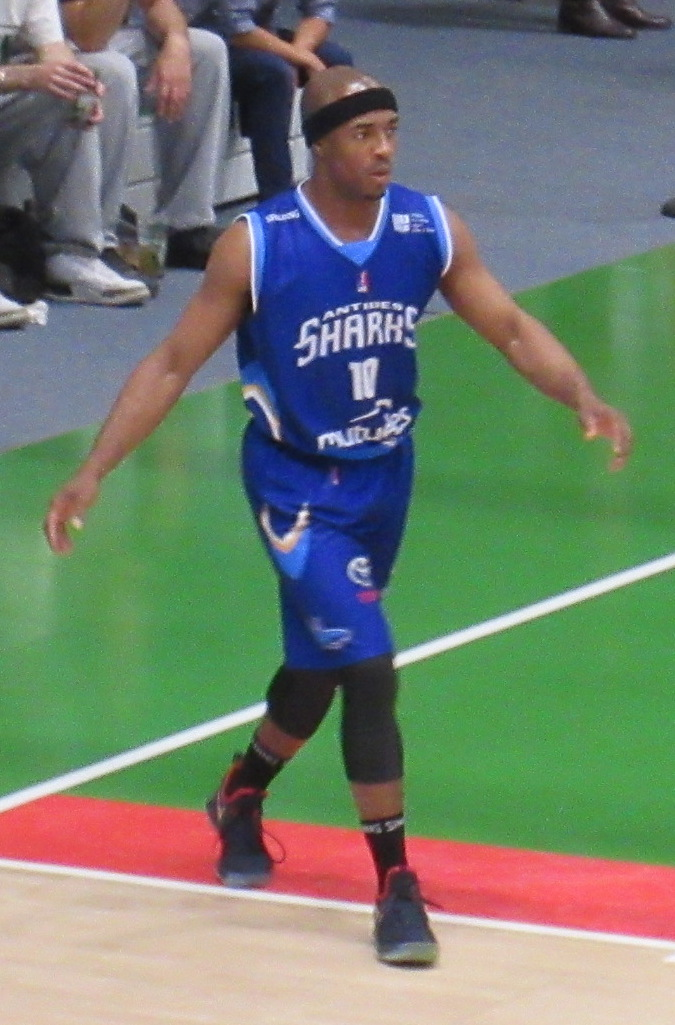
- Blassingame with Antibes Sharks in 2017

AIK Basket
- Position: Point guard
- League: Superettan

Personal information
- Born: September 12, 1981 (age 45) Brooklyn, New York, U.S.
- Listed height: 5 ft 10 in (1.78 m)
- Listed weight: 179 lb (81 kg)

Career information
- High school: Redirection (Newark, New Jersey)
- College: Los Angeles CC (2001–2003); UNLV (2003–2005)
- NBA draft: 2005: undrafted
- Playing career: 2005–present

Career history
- 2005–2006: ENAD
- 2006: AEK Athens
- 2006–2007: Solna Vikings
- 2007–2008: Maccabi Rishon LeZion
- 2008–2009: Lappeenrannan NMKY
- 2009: 08 Stockholm
- 2009–2010: Odesa
- 2010–2011: Czarni Słupsk
- 2011–2013: Asseco Prokom
- 2013–2014: Cibona Zagreb
- 2014–2017: Czarni Słupsk
- 2017: Promitheas Patras
- 2017–2018: Antibes Sharks
- 2018–2019: Élan Béarnais
- 2021–present: AIK Basket

Career highlights
- Adriatic League champion (2014); Polish League champion (2012); Croatian Cup winner (2013); Polish League Finals MVP (2012); Adriatic League assists leader (2014); 2× Polish League assists leader (2015, 2016); French Pro A assists leader (2018)

Jerel Romaine Blassingame (born September 12, 1981) is an American professional basketball player for AIK Basket of the Swedish second-tier Superettan. He is 1.75 metres (5 ft 9 in) in height and plays at the point guard position.

== Amateur career ==
Blassingame played at Redirection High School in Brooklyn, New York, before attending Los Angeles City College, where he helped the team win a California state championship in 2002–03. He was named MVP of the state tournament, and was an All-Southcoast Conference selection that year.

He later transferred to UNLV, where he averaged 11.2 ppg and 6.6 assists in his junior season (2003–04). In his senior year, he averaged 8.9 ppg and 5.5 apg.

== Professional career ==
Before beginning his career in Finland, Blassingame played with Maccabi Rishon LeZion in the Israeli League. He also played in the Swedish Obol Basketball League, with the Solna Vikings. Prior to his career with Solna, he played with ENAD in the Cypriot League and AEK Athens BC in the Greek League. For the 2009–10 season, he was the starting point guard for BC Odesa in Ukraine. In the 2010–11 season Blassingame was a key player for Energa Czarni Słupsk, the leader of the Polish Basket League. In the winter season Energa Czarni Słupsk finished with a win–loss record of 10–1, and Blassingame averaged 12.4 points per game and 6.2 assists per game. In August 2011 he signed with Asseco Prokom Gdynia. After a season and a half in Poland, Blassingame moved to Croatia, signing for Cibona Zagreb. He helped them win the ABA League title in the 2013–14 season. In December 2014 he terminated his contract with Cibona.

On December 7, 2014, he signed with Polish club Energa Czarni Słupsk. On January 9, 2017, he parted ways with Czarni Słupsk. On January 24, 2017, he returned to the Greek Basket League and signed with Promitheas Patras in order to replace the injured Keydren Clark, who was released.
