= Eurocup 2014–15 Regular Season Group L =

Standings and Results for Group L of the Last 32 phase of the 2014–15 Eurocup basketball tournament.

== Standings ==
Pos	Team	Pld	W	L	PF	PA	PD	TUR	LRY	OST	SEV
1	(Poland) PGE Turów	6	5	1	553	501	+52		104–93	99–71	87–84
2	(Lithuania) Lietuvos Rytas	6	3	3	553	514	+39	98–86		111–83	100–78
3	(Belgium) Telenet Oostende	6	2	4	474	506	−32	79–80	75–69		72–84
4	(Spain) Sevilla	6	2	4	473	532	−59	76–97	88–82	63–94	

Source: Euroleague Basketball;
