= Michał Chyliński =

Polish basketball player (born 1986)

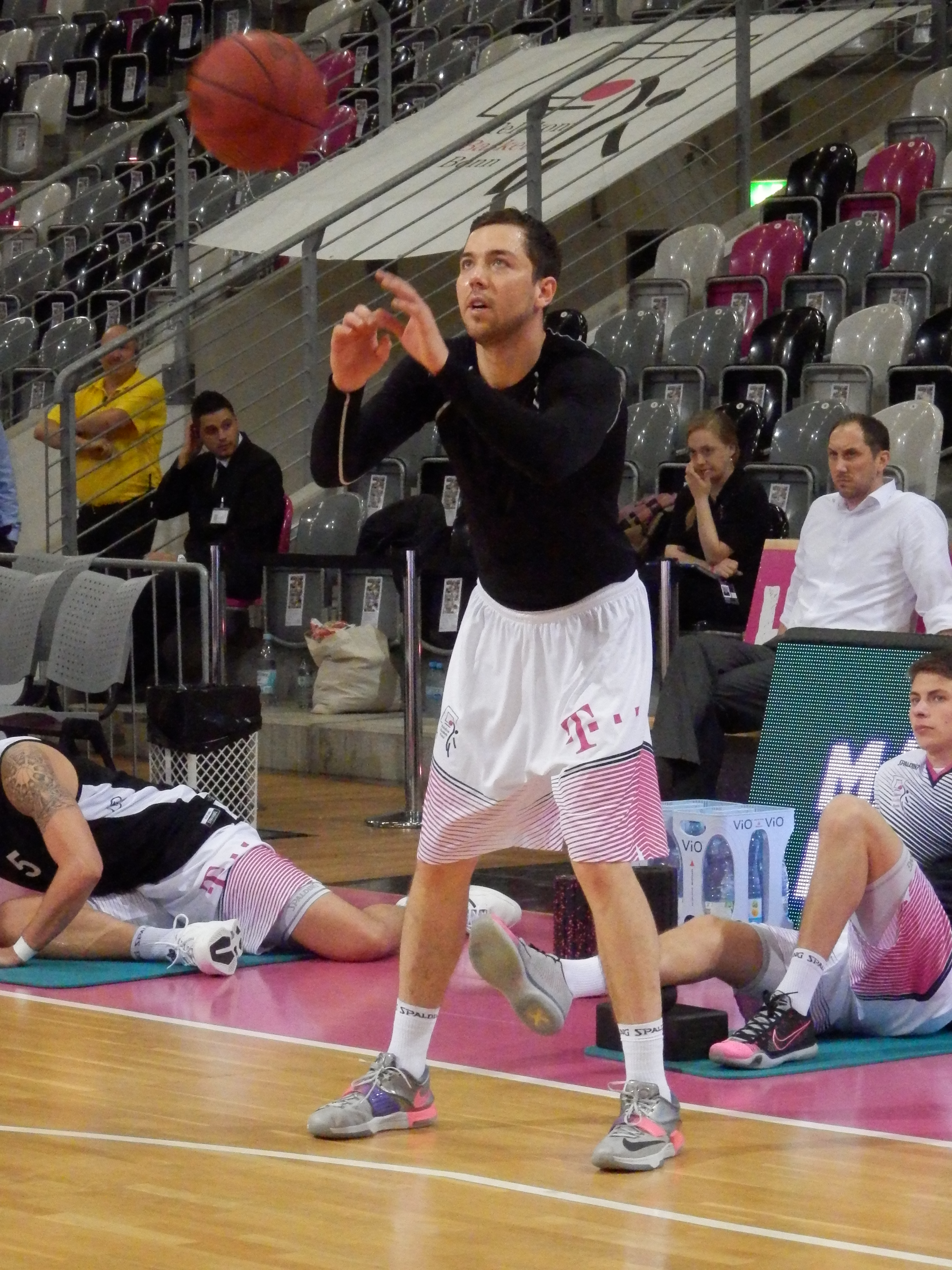

Astoria Bydgoszcz
- Title: Sporting director
- League: Bank Pekao S.A. I Liga

Personal information
- Born: 22 February 1986 (age 40) Bydgoszcz, Poland
- Listed height: 196 cm (6 ft 5 in)
- Listed weight: 95 kg (209 lb)

Career information
- Playing career: 2003–2026
- Position: Point guard / shooting guard

Career history
- 2003–2004: SMS PZKosz Warka
- 2004: JSF Nanterre
- 2005–2006: Astoria Bydgoszcz
- 2006–2008: Unicaja Malaga
- 2006–2008: →Clinicas Rincon Axarquia Malaga
- 2007: →CD Villa de Los Barrios
- 2008–2009: Clinicas Rincon Axarquia Malaga
- 2009–2015: PGE Turów Zgorzelec
- 2015: Telekom Baskets Bonn
- 2016–2017: Anwil Włocławek
- 2017–2019: Stal Ostrów Wielkopolski
- 2019–2022: Astoria Bydgoszcz
- 2022–2023: Czarni Słupsk
- 2023–2024: Stal Ostrów Wielkopolski
- 2024–2026: Astoria Bydgoszcz

Career highlights
- Polish League champion (2014); Polish Supercup champion (2015); Polish Supercup MVP (2015); 2× Polish League All-Star (2010, 2013)

Michał Chyliński (born 22 February 1986) is a Polish former professional basketball player. He has played for the Polish national basketball team on many occasions.
