= Quinton Hosley =

American-Georgian basketball player

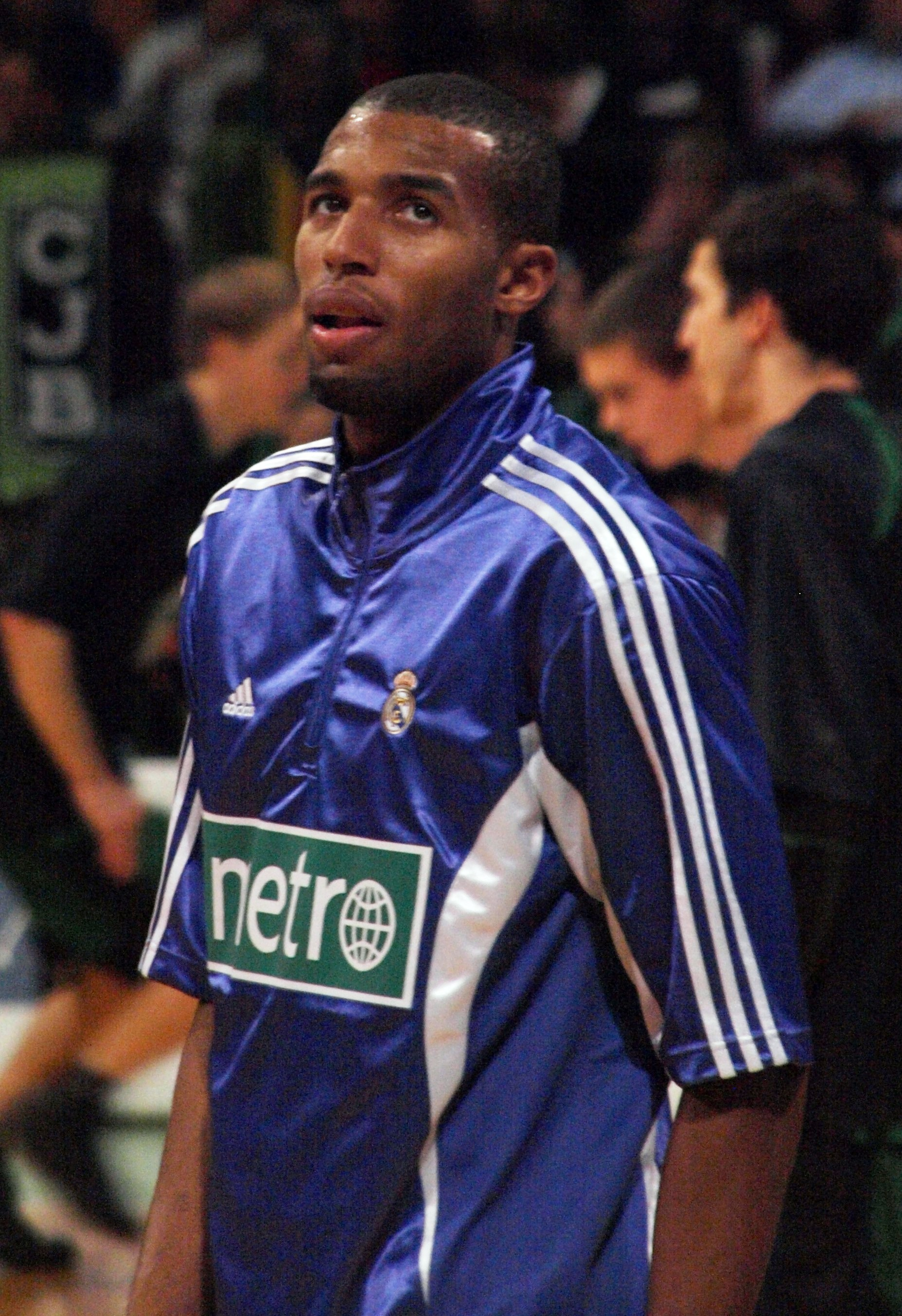
- Hosley warming-up with Real Madrid

Personal information
- Born: March 25, 1984 (age 42) New York City, New York, U.S.
- Listed height: 6 ft 7 in (2.01 m)
- Listed weight: 215 lb (98 kg)

Career information
- High school: Abraham Lincoln (Denver, Colorado)
- College: Lamar CC (2002–2004); Fresno State (2005–2007)
- NBA draft: 2007: undrafted
- Playing career: 2007–2021
- Position: Small forward

Career history
- 2007–2008: Pınar Karşıyaka
- 2008: Real Madrid
- 2008–2009: Galatasaray Café Crown
- 2009–2010: Aliağa Petkim
- 2010–2011: DKV Joventut
- 2011–2012: Dinamo Sassari
- 2012–2013: Stelmet Zielona Góra
- 2013–2014: Virtus Roma
- 2014–2015: Stelmet Zielona Góra
- 2015–2016: Yeşilgiresun Belediye
- 2016–2017: Shahrdari Arak
- 2017–2018: Yeşilgiresun Belediye
- 2018: Anwil Włocławek
- 2018–2019: Stelmet Zielona Góra

Career highlights
- 3× Polish League champion (2013, 2015, 2018); 2× Polish League Finals MVP (2013, 2015); Polish League All-First Team (2015); Polish League Best Defender (2015); Turkish Super League All-Star Game MVP (2008)

Quinton Robert Hosley (born March 25, 1984) is an American-born naturalized Georgian professional basketball player for Stelmet Zielona Góra of the Polish Basketball League. He is a 2.01 m (6 ft 7 in) tall swingman. He is the son of streetball and Rucker Park legend Ron Mathias.

== Collegiate career ==
He played two seasons of the college basketball at Lamar Community College and Fresno State University. His career averages are 16.1 points and 9 rebounds per game.

== Professional career ==
After going undrafted in the 2007 NBA draft, Hosley joined the Turkish League team Pınar Karşıyaka in 2007. In 2008, he joined the Spanish ACB League team Real Madrid. After being released from Real Madrid due to poor performances, Hosley signed a contract with the Turkish team Galatasaray Café Crown.

On October 23, 2010, he agreed to a deal with another Turkish team Aliağa Petkim.

In the summer of 2010, Hosley signed a two-year deal with DKV Joventut of the Spanish ACB League.

In July 2011, he signed with Italian club Dinamo Basket Sassari.

On August 8, 2012, he signed a one-year contract with the 2012 Polish League Bronze Medalist Stelmet Zielona Góra. In 2013, Hosley won the Polish League Championship (first championship in the history of Zielona Góra). He has also become the Finals MVP.

On July 8, 2013, Hosley signed with Virtus Roma of Italy for the 2013–14 season.

In July 2014, Hosley returned to Zielona Góra signing a contract for the 2014–15 season. He was once again named the PLK Finals MVP in 2015, after Zielona Gora beat PGE Turów Zgorzelec 4–2 in the Finals.

On August 3, 2015, he signed a one-year deal with Krasny Oktyabr of Russia. One month later, on September 3, he parted ways with Krasny Oktyabr before appearing in a game for them. On October 6, 2015, he signed with Turkish club Yeşilgiresun Belediye for the rest of the season.

On July 21, 2016, Hosley signed with French club Nanterre 92. However, he left Nanterre before appearing in a game for them. In October 2016, he signed with Iranian club Shahrdari Arak for the 2016–17 season.

On October 5, 2017, Hosley signed with his former club Yeşilgiresun Belediye for the 2017–18 BSL season. On January 31, 2018, he moved to Polish club Anwil Włocławek for the rest of the season.

== Georgian national team ==
Hosley played for the Georgia national basketball team in 2010.

== Career statistics ==
Legend
GP	Games played	GS	Games started	MPG	Minutes per game
FG%	Field-goal percentage	3P%	3-point field-goal percentage	FT%	Free-throw percentage
RPG	Rebounds per game	APG	Assists per game	SPG	Steals per game
BPG	Blocks per game	PPG	Points per game	PIR	Performance index rating
**Bold**	Career high

=== College ===
College	Year	GP	GS	MIN	FG%	3P%	FT%	RPG	APG	SPG	BPG	PPG
Fresno State	2005–06	28	28	**35.1**	.408	**.343**	**.749**	**9.2**	1.4	**2.1**	**1.1**	**18.6**
Fresno State	2006–07	**32**	**32**	33.3	**.418**	.322	.672	8.9	**1.6**	1.3	.6	13.9
**Career**		60	60	34.1	.413	.332	.708	9.0	1.5	1.7	.8	16.1

=== EuroLeague ===
Year	Team	GP	GS	MPG	FG%	3P%	FT%	RPG	APG	SPG	BPG	PPG	PIR
2008–09	Real Madrid	13	7	16.3	.463	.348	.718	3.2	.5	.8	.5	8.6	8.8
Career		13	7	16.3	.463	.348	.718	3.2	.5	.8	.5	8.6	8.8
