= Start Lublin =

PGE Start Lublin
- Leagues: PLK
- Founded: 1953; 73 years ago
- Arena: Globus
- Capacity: 5,000
- Location: Lublin, Poland
- President: Arkadiusz Pelczar
- Head coach: Wojciech Kamiński
- Team captain: Filip Put
- Website: www.startlublin.pl
Home	Away	Third

Start Lublin, officially PGE Start Lublin for sponsporship reasons, is a Polish basketball club based in Lublin. The team plays in the Polish Basketball League (PLK) since 2014. Its home arena is the Globus, which has places for 5,000 people. The basketball team is a part of MKS Start Lublin, which also holds chess and athletics sections.

== History ==
MKS Start Lublin was founded in 1953, along with the basketball team. After seven years of existence, Start promoted to the Polish Basketball League (PLK), the national highest league. In the 1964–65 season, Start captured its first bronze medal. In 1978, Start was the first Polish club to sign an African-American played in Kent Washington. Washington was named PLK Most Valuable Player in 1980.

In the 2002–03 season, Start returned to the PLK after winning the First Division. After two years, the team relegated once again.

In the summer of 2014, Start Lublin received a wild card from the PLK because of the expansion from 12 to 16 teams.

Lublin had its most successful season in the 2019–20 PLK season, which was curtailed due to the COVID-19 pandemic. When the season was ended, the team was in second place with a 17–5 record. As such, it qualified for a European competition for the first time in the 2020–21 Basketball Champions League.

== Honours ==
Polish Basketball League

- Runners-up (2): 2019–20, 2024–25
- Bronze medal (3): 1964–65, 1978–79, 1979–80

Polish Basketball Cup

- Runners-up (2): 2022, 2023

Polish Basketball Supercup

- Winners (1): 2025

== Sponsorship names ==
Due to sponsorship reasons, the club has been known by several names:

- Start Jadar (1992–93)
- Start Instal (1993–96)
- Start Faelbud (1996–98)
- Gala Start (1998–99)
- AICE Start (2000–01)
- Start Lublin (2002–2005)
- Start AZS Lublin (2005–2008)
- Start Lublin (2008–2009)
- Olimp Start Lublin (2009–2011)
- Start Lublin (2011–2012)
- Wikana Start S.A. Lublin (2012–2015)
- TBV Start Lublin (2015–2019)
- Pszczółka Start Lublin (2020)
- Polski Cukier Pszczółka Start Lublin (2021–2025)
- PGE Start Lublin (2025–present)

== Season by season ==
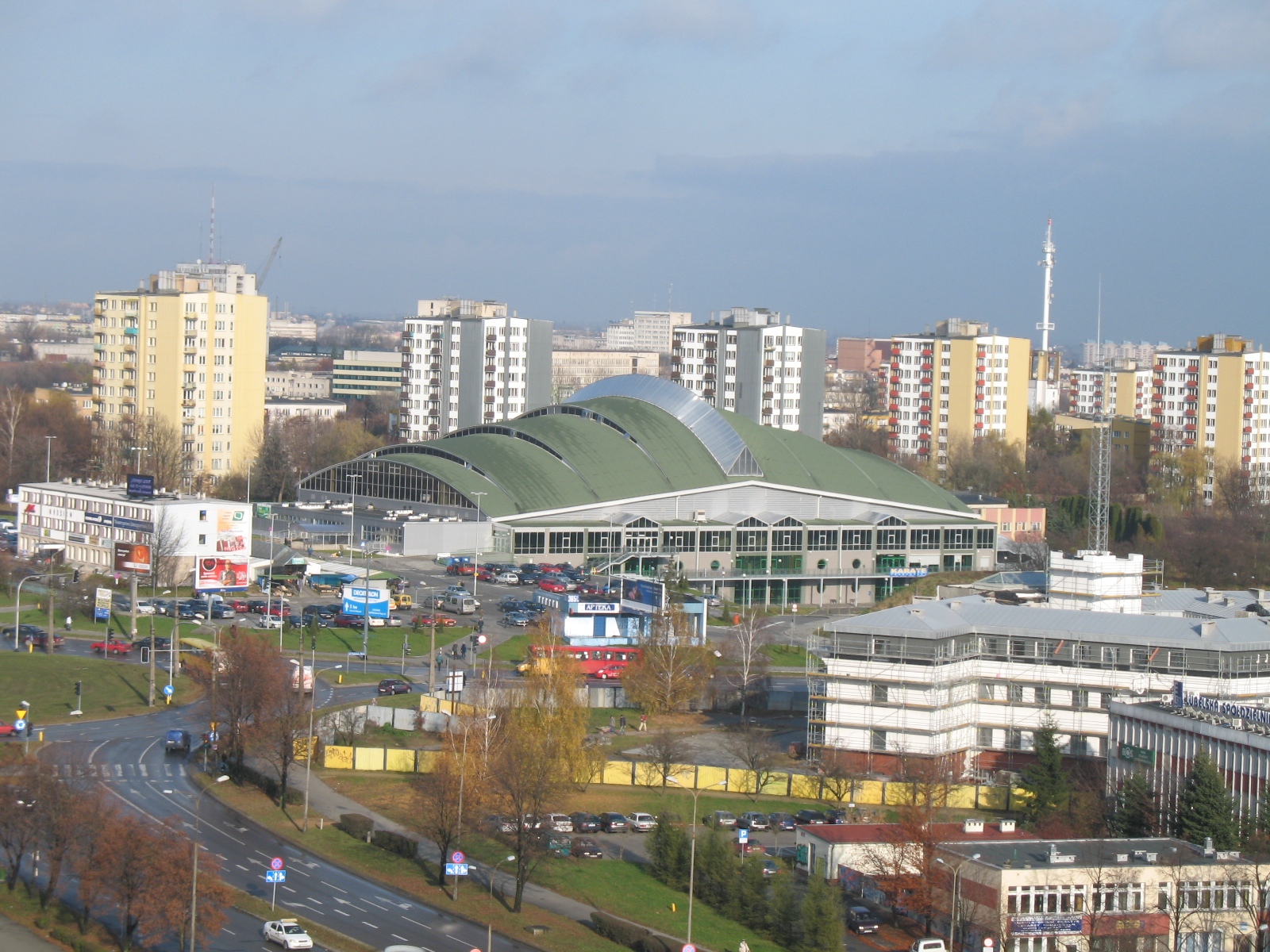
The Globus, home arena of Start Lublin

Season	Tier	League	Pos.	Polish Cup	European competitions	
2006–07	2	I liga	10th			
2007–08	2	I liga	16th			
2008–09	3	2 Liga	1st			
2009–10	2	I liga	9th			
2010–11	2	I liga	12th			
2011–12	2	I liga	12th			
2012–13	2	I liga	8th			
2013–14	2	I liga	4th (Note: Lublin received a wild card to play in the PLK, due to the expansion of the league.)			
2014–15	1	PLK	14th			
2015–16	1	PLK	17th			
2016–17	1	PLK	15th			
2017–18	1	PLK	9th	Quarterfinalist		
2018–19	1	PLK	10th			
2019–20	1	PLK	2nd (Note: The 2019–20 PLK season was cancelled prematurely because of the COVID-19 pandemic in Poland.)			
2020–21	1	PLK	6th		2 Champions League	RS
2021–22	1	PLK	12th	Runners–up		
2022–23	1	PLK	13th	Runners–up	R ENBL	SF^{3rd}
2023–24	1	PLK	9th	Quarterfinalist	R ENBL	RS
2024–25	1	PLK	2nd	Quarterfinalist		
2025–26	1	PLK	13th		3 Champions League	QR
2025–26	1	PLK	13th		4 FIBA Europe Cup	RS

== Players ==
=== Current roster ===
Note: Flags indicate national team eligibility at FIBA-sanctioned events. Players may hold other non-FIBA nationalities not displayed.

PGE Start Lublin roster
Players
Coaches

Pos.	No.	Nat.	Name	Ht.
PG	3	(United States)	Ramey, Courtney	1.91 m (6 ft 3 in)	27 – 2 October 1999
PG	4	(United States)	Lottie, Jaizec	1.84 m (6 ft 0 in)	28 – 16 February 1998
F	5	(Poland)	Siergiej, Cezary	2.02 m (6 ft 8 in)	19 – 21 February 2007
G	6	(United States)	Starks, TJ	1.88 m (6 ft 2 in)	28 – 11 September 1998
PG	7	(Poland)	Pelczar, Bartłomiej	1.86 m (6 ft 1 in)	26 – 5 February 2000
F	10	(Poland)	Ciechociński, Bartosz	2.03 m (6 ft 8 in)	35 – 19 September 1991
C	13	(Estonia)	Tass, Matthias	2.08 m (6 ft 10 in)	27 – 23 March 1999
F	14	(Poland)	Kulka, Grzegorz	2.05 m (6 ft 9 in)	30 – 4 April 1996
PF	15	(Latvia)	Miška, Anrijs	2.08 m (6 ft 10 in)	26 – 14 January 2000
PF	21	(Poland)	Put, Filip (C)	2.01 m (6 ft 7 in)	33 – 8 April 1993
G	23	(Estonia)	Jõesaar, Janari	1.98 m (6 ft 6 in)	32 – 8 December 1993
SG	55	(United States)	Williamson, Lucas	1.93 m (6 ft 4 in)	28 – 28 January 1998

Head coach

- (Poland) Wojciech Kamiński

Assistant coach(es)

- (Poland) Michał Sikora
- (Poland) Tobiasz Łukaszyk

Legend

- (C) Team captain
- Injured

- Roster
Updated: November 10, 2026

=== Individual awards ===
PLK Most Valuable Player

- Kent Washington – 1980

=== Notable players ===
- Brynton Lemar, basketball player in the Israeli Basketball Premier League
- Chavaughn Lewis (born 1993), basketball player for Hapoel Galil Elyon of the Israeli Basketball Premier League
- Devonte Upson (born 1993), basketball player in the Israeli Basketball Premier League
- Kent Washington (born 1956), basketball player
