= MKS Dąbrowa Górnicza (basketball) =

- Leagues: PLK
- Founded: 1992; 34 years ago
- Arena: Hala Centrum
- Capacity: 2,944
- Location: Dąbrowa Górnicza, Poland
- Team colors: Red, White, Navy
- Head coach: Artur Gronek
- Team captain: Marcin Piechowicz
- Website: www.mksdabrowa.pl
Home	Away

MKS Dąbrowa Górnicza is a Polish professional basketball team based in Dąbrowa Górnicza. The team currently plays in the Polish Basketball League (PLK) since 2014.

== History ==
The basketball section of MKS Dąbrowa Górnicza was found in 1992. In 2003, the club started acting on the national third level. It played for several years in the 2 Liga, until the team won the championship in 2007–08 and was promoted.

The team remained in the 1 Liga for the next 6 seasons. In 2009–10 the team was close to promotion to the PLK but failed to beat Siarka Tarnobrzeg.

MKS was offered a spot in the 2014–15 PLK season as a wild card because of the expansion from 12 to 16 teams.

== Players ==
=== Current roster ===
Note: Flags indicate national team eligibility at FIBA-sanctioned events. Players may hold other non-FIBA nationalities not displayed.

MKS Dąbrowa Górnicza roster
Players
Coaches

Pos.	No.	Nat.	Name
SG	0	(United States)	Lofton, Kyle	1.90 m (6 ft 3 in)	27 – 31 May 1999
G	1	(Poland)	Wojdała, Jakub	1.94 m (6 ft 4 in)	19 – 26 June 2007
G	2	(United States)	Kountz, Daylen	1.93 m (6 ft 4 in)	26 – 26 February 2000
F	3	(Poland)	Wojdała, Przemysław	1.89 m (6 ft 2 in)	16 – 12 November 2009
G/F	4	(Poland)	Piechowicz, Marcin (C)	1.98 m (6 ft 6 in)	33 – 19 March 1993
SF	5	(United States)	Hyatt, Aundre	1.98 m (6 ft 6 in)	26 – 23 July 2000
SF	9	(Poland)	Jakubiec, Dawid	1.97 m (6 ft 6 in)	19 – 4 August 2007
G	10	(Poland)	Musiał, Jakub	1.86 m (6 ft 1 in)	28 – 22 September 1998
G	12	(Poland)	Musiałek, Stanisław	1.90 m (6 ft 3 in)	27 – 31 May 1999
PF	15	(Czech Republic)	Peterka, Martin	2.06 m (6 ft 9 in)	31 – 12 January 1995
PG	17	(United States)	Hall, Jordan	2.02 m (6 ft 8 in)	24 – 14 January 2002
C	21	(Poland)	Nagel, Maciej	2.03 m (6 ft 8 in)	21 – 14 September 2005
C	22	(United States)	Boone, Kalib	2.05 m (6 ft 9 in)	25 – 3 November 2000
F	23	(Poland)	Woźny, Nikodem	1.97 m (6 ft 6 in)	18 – 4 July 2008
C	25	(Poland)	Jęch, Maksymilian	2.10 m (6 ft 11 in)	22 – 14 April 2004
SG	77	(Poland)	Woroniecki, Marcin	1.91 m (6 ft 3 in)	26 – 13 March 2000

Head coach

- (Poland) Artur Gronek

Assistant coach(es)

- (Poland) Maciej Raczyński
- (Poland) Łukasz Szczypka

Legend

- (C) Team captain
- Injured

- Roster
Updated: September 13, 2026

== Honours ==
- Alpe Adria Cup
  - Champions (2): 2022–23, 2023–24

== Season by season ==
Season	Tier	League	Pos	Polish Cup	European competitions	
2010–11	2	1 Liga	3rd			
2011–12	2	1 Liga	4th			
2012–13	2	1 Liga	2nd			
2013–14	2	1 Liga	5th			
2014–15	1	PLK	11th			
2015–16	1	PLK	10th	Quarterfinalist		
2016–17	1	PLK	6th	Quarterfinalist		
2017–18	1	PLK	6th	Quarterfinalist		
2018–19	1	PLK	6th	Semifinalist		
2019–20	1	PLK	15th			
2020–21	1	PLK	9th			
2021–22	1	PLK	14th			
2022–23	1	PLK	11th		R Alpe Adria Cup	C
2023–24	1	PLK	7th		R Alpe Adria Cup	C
2024–25	1	PLK	14th			
2025–26	1	PLK	9th			

== Notable players ==
Note: Flags indicate national team eligibility at FIBA-sanctioned events. Players may hold other non-FIBA nationalities not displayed.

Criteria

To appear in this section a player must have either:

- Set a club record or won an individual award while at the club
- Played at least one official international match for their national team at any time
- Played at least one official NBA match at any time.

- (Croatia) Josip Sobin
- (Estonia) Matthias Tass
- (United Kingdom) Sacha Killeya-Jones
- (Slovenia) Martin Krampelj
- (Serbia) Jovan Novak
- (United States) Rashaun Broadus
- (United States) Kerron Johnson
- (United States) Robert Johnson
- (United States) Dominic Artis
- (United States) Devyn Marble
- (United States) Trevon Bluiett
- (United States) Joe Chealey
- (United States) Gerry Blakes
