= Kamil Chanas =

Polish media personality and basketball player

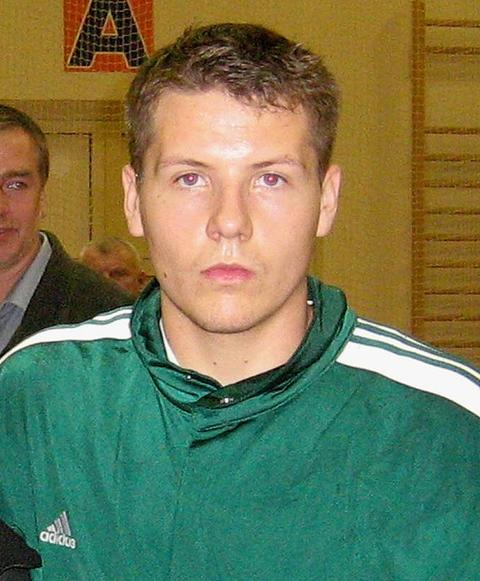

Personal information
- Born: 20 April 1985 (age 41) Wrocław, Poland
- Listed height: 6 ft 2 in (1.88 m)
- Listed weight: 210 lb (95 kg)

Career information
- NBA draft: 2007: undrafted
- Playing career: 2003–2022
- Position: Shooting guard
- Number: 13

Career history
- 2003–2008: Śląsk Wrocław
- 2008–2009: Górnik Wałbrzych
- 2009–2010: Turów Zgorzelec
- 2010–2012: Polpharma Starogard Gdański
- 2012–2015: Stelmet Zielona Góra
- 2015–2016: Śląsk Wrocław
- 2016–2017: Stal Ostrów Wielkopolski
- 2017–2020: Polonia Leszno
- 2020–2022: Rycerze Rydzyna

Career highlights
- 2× Polish League champion (2013, 2015)

Kamil Chanas (born 20 April 1985) is a Polish media personality and former professional basketball player.
