= 2011–12 PLK season =

Tauron Basket Liga^{1}
- Duration: October 8, 2011 – June 6, 2012
- Games played: 276
- Teams: 12

Regular season
- Season MVP: (United States Virgin Islands) Walter Hodge

Finals
- Champions: Asseco Prokom Gdynia; 9th title
- Runners-up: Trefl Sopot
- Third place: Zastal Zielona Góra
- Fourth place: PGE Turów Zgorzelec
- Finals MVP: (United States) Jerel Blassingame

Statistical leaders
Points	(United States Virgin Islands) Walter Hodge	19.4
Rebounds	(United States) Darrell Harris	11.6
Assists	(Poland) Robert Skibniewski	7.2

Records
- Highest scoring: 45 – (United States) Brandon Hazzard
- Highest attendance: 10,152; Trefl Sopot 73–77 Asseco Prokom Gdynia (14 April 2012)
- Average attendance: 1,940
- ^{1} Sponsored league name, referring to Tauron.

The 2011–12 Polish Basketball League (Tauron Basket Liga for sponsorship reasons) was the 84th edition of the Polish national championship.

The regular season started on 8 October 2011. The season ended on 6 June 2012, when Asseco Prokom Gdynia won their 9th consecutive title in a row this season, by beating Trefl Sopot 4–3 in the Finals.

== Participants ==
- Anwil Włocławek
- Asseco Prokom Gdynia ^{1}
- AZS Koszalin
- AZS Politechnika Warszawska
- Energa Czarni Słupsk
- Kotwica Kołobrzeg
- ŁKS Łódź
- PBG Basket Poznań
- PGE Turów Zgorzelec
- Polpharma Starogard Gd.
- Siarka Jezioro Tarnobrzeg
- WKS Śląsk Wrocław
- Trefl Sopot
- Zastal Zielona Góra

Note
^1 Asseco Prokom Gdynia did not participate in the regular season, but entered the Second Phase.

Tauron Basket Liga 2011–12 – Club Locations

== Regular season ==
Pos	Team	Pld	W	L	PF	PA	PD	Pts	
1	Energa Czarni Słupsk	14	11	3	1102	1003	+99	25	Qualified for the Playoffs
2	PGE Turów Zgorzelec	14	10	4	1110	909	+201	24	Qualified for the Playoffs
3	Trefl Sopot	14	10	4	1187	1027	+160	24	Qualified for the Playoffs
4	Anwil Włocławek	13	9	4	1063	995	+68	22	Qualified for the Playoffs
5	Kotwica Kołobrzeg	14	7	7	1067	1065	+2	21	Qualified for the Playoffs
6	WKS Śląsk Wrocław	13	7	6	1003	986	+17	20	Qualified for the Playoffs
7	Zastal Zielona Góra	13	7	6	1052	1040	+12	20	Qualified for the Playoffs
8	Siarka Jezioro Tarnobrzeg	13	7	6	1083	1106	−23	20	Qualified for the Playoffs
9	AZS Koszalin	13	6	7	1062	1056	+6	19	
10	PBG Basket Poznań	14	5	9	1024	1128	−104	19	
11	Polpharma Starogard Gd.	14	4	10	1076	1194	−118	18	
12	ŁKS Łódź	14	3	11	1027	1225	−198	17	
13	AZS Politechnika Warszawska	13	2	11	953	1075	−122	15	

== Playoffs ==
Quarter-finals
1	Asseco Prokom Gdynia	3
8	AZS Koszalin	2
4	Zastal Zielona Góra	3
5	Energa Czarni Słupsk	2
2	Trefl Sopot	3
7	Śląsk Wrocław	2
3	Anwil Włocławek	1
6	PGE Turòw	3

Semi-finals
1	Asseco Prokom Gdynia	3
4	Zastal Zielona Góra	0
2	Trefl Sopot	3
6	PGE Turòw	1

Finals
1	Asseco Prokom Gdynia	4
2	Trefl Sopot	3
Third place
4	Zastal Zielona Góra
6	PGE Turòw

== Awards ==
- Most Valuable Player: (United States Virgin Islands) Walter Hodge (Zielona Gora Basket)
- Finals MVP: (United States) Jerel Blassingame (Asseco Prokom Gdynia)

== Polish clubs in European competitions ==
Team	Competition	Progress
Asseco Prokom Gdynia	Euroleague	Regular season
PGE Turow Zgorzelec	Eurocup	Regular season

== Polish clubs in Regional competitions ==
Team	Competition	Progress
Asseco Prokom Gdynia	VTB United League	Regular season
Anwil Wloclawek	VTB United League	Qualifying round

== See also ==
- VTB United League 2011–12
