= Wojciech Kamiński =

Polish basketball coach

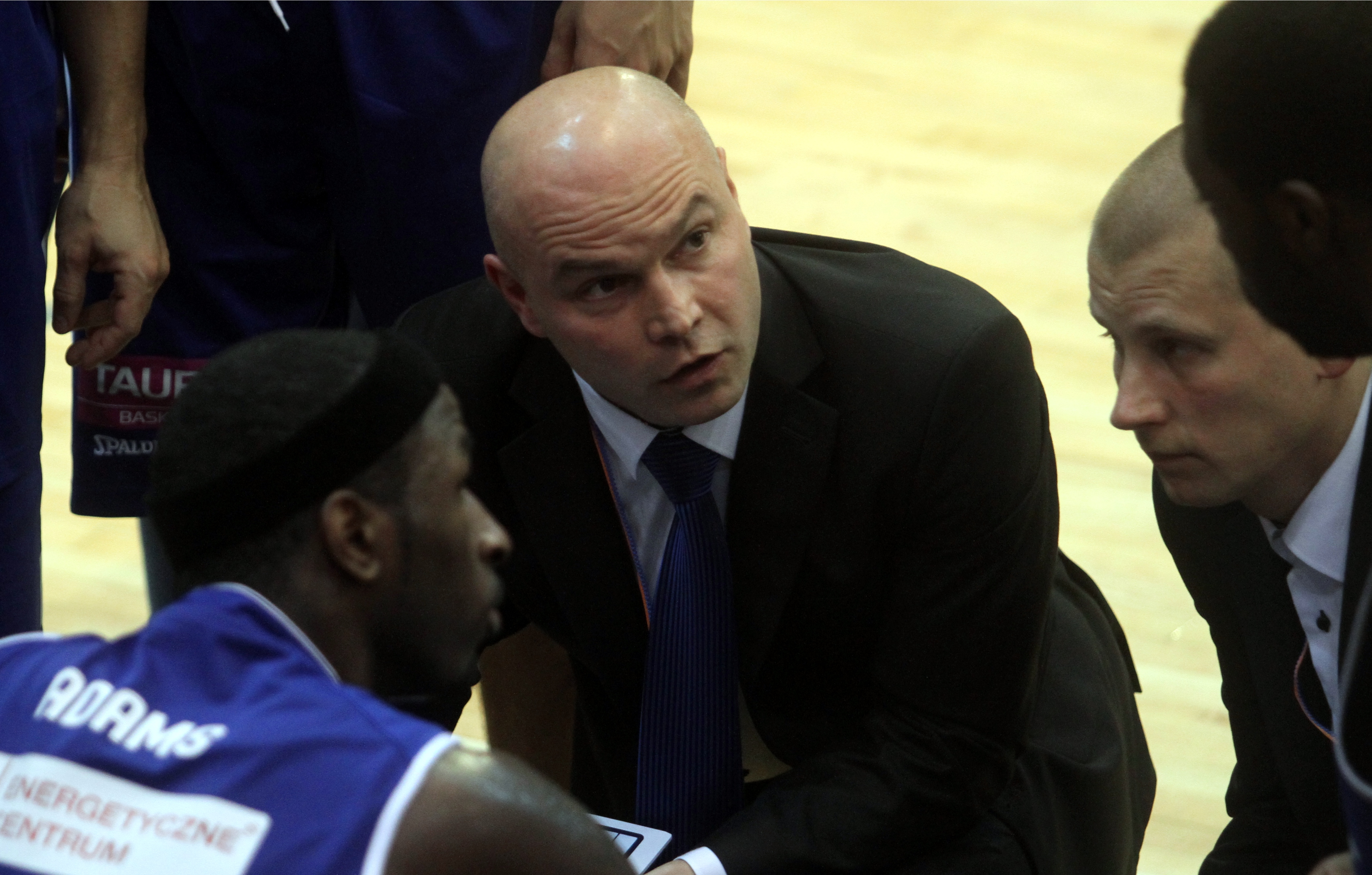

Start Lublin
- Position: Head coach
- League: PLK

Personal information
- Born: 27 February 1974 (age 52)
- Coaching career: 2002–present

Career history

Coaching
- 2013–2018: Rosa Radom
- 2019: Mitteldeutscher BC
- 2020–2024: Legia Warszawa
- 2024–present: Start Lublin

Career highlights
- 2× Polish Cup winner (2016, 2024); 2× Polish Supercup winner (2016, 2025); PLK Best Coach (2015)

Wojciech Kamiński (born 27 February 1974) is a Polish professional basketball coach. He is the current head coach of Start Lublin of the Polish Basketball League (PLK).

== Coaching career ==
Kamiński was appointed head coach of Rosa Radom in 2013. He led Rosa to the Polish Basketball Cup title in 2016. In 2015, he was named Coach of the Year in PLK.

On 12 June 2019, Kamiński was announced as head coach of Syntainics MBC of the German Basketball Bundesliga (BBL), where he replaced outgoing Silvano Poropat. Further, he has been the assistant coach of Poland's national basketball team.

On 23 February 2020, Kamiński signed as head coach with Legia Warszawa of the Polish Basketball League (PLK).

On 31 May 2024, Kamiński signed with Start Lublin of the Polish Basketball League (PLK).

== Honours ==
- PLK Best Coach: 2014–15
