= Czarni Słupsk =

Energa Czarni Słupsk
- Leagues: PLK
- Founded: 1989
- History: List: Alkpol-Czarni (1997–1999) Brok-Alkpol (1999–2001) M&S Okna (2001) Brok Czarni (2001–2002) Czarni (2002–2005) Energa Czarni (2005–present)
- Arena: Hala Gryfia
- Capacity: 2,500
- Location: Słupsk, Poland
- Team colors: Black, Red, Silver, Blue
- Head coach: Ivica Skelin
- Team captain: Kacper Borowski
- Website: https://czarni.stk.slupsk.pl/pl
Home	Away

Czarni Słupsk, more commonly known as Energa Czarni Słupsk because of sponsorship reasons, is a Polish basketball team, based in Słupsk, playing in Polish Basketball League (PLK). The home arena of the club was Hala Gryfia.

== History ==
In July 1945, the original Czarni Słupsk team was formed, by railway workers who moved from Kraków to Słupsk after World War II. The club was originated as an association football club, but in 1989 the basketball section was founded. In the 1998–99 season, the team promoted to the Polish Basketball League (PLK). In the 2005–06 season, the first club honour was one: the bronze medal. In the 2010s Czarni Słupsk was a steady competitor in the PLK, with several Playoff appearances.

On 31 January 2018, Czarni Słupsk retired from the league and was dissolved due to financial collapse.

In 2018, it was decided to re-start basketball activities for the club and before 2021–22 season, they promoted to PLK, first-tier of Polish basketball system.

== Players ==
=== Current roster ===
Note: Flags indicate national team eligibility at FIBA-sanctioned events. Players may hold other non-FIBA nationalities not displayed.

Energa Czarni Słupsk roster
Players
Coaches

Pos.	No.	Nat.	Name	Ht.	Wt.	Age
PF	0	(United States)	Robinson, Demond	2.06 m (6 ft 9 in)		26 – 11 October 2000
SF	1	(United States)	Green, Dominic	1.98 m (6 ft 6 in)		29 – 29 March 1997
PG	2	(Poland)	Stupnicki, Jakub	1.80 m (5 ft 11 in)		22 – 23 July 2004
SG	4	(United States)	Cheese, Tyler	1.96 m (6 ft 5 in)		30 – 13 November 1996
PG	5	(Serbia)	Dimitrijević, Djordje	1.88 m (6 ft 2 in)		29 – 6 February 1997
SF	12	(Poland)	Pluta, Jan	1.95 m (6 ft 5 in)		21 – 12 May 2005
PF	13	(Poland)	Borowski, Kacper (C)	2.05 m (6 ft 9 in)		32 – 2 May 1994
F	21	(United States)	Carpenter, Robert	2.01 m (6 ft 7 in)		27 – 13 October 1999
F	25	(Poland)	Grudziński, Dominik	2.06 m (6 ft 9 in)		28 – 4 February 1998
F	26	(Canada)	Veinot, Keevan	1.93 m (6 ft 4 in)		28 – 6 November 1998
C	34	(Poland)	Kornacki, Alek	2.11 m (6 ft 11 in)		20 – 19 April 2006
G	45	(United States)	Madsen, Mason	1.93 m (6 ft 4 in)		25 – 1 May 2001

Head coach

- (Poland) Krzysztof Szablowski

Assistant coach(es)

- (Poland) Łukasz Seweryn

Legend

- (C) Team captain
- Injured

- Roster
Updated: November 10, 2026

=== Notable players ===
Note: Flags indicate national team eligibility at FIBA-sanctioned events. Players may hold other non-FIBA nationalities not displayed.

Criteria

To appear in this section a player must have either:

- Set a club record or won an individual award while at the club
- Played at least one official international match for their national team at any time
- Played at least one official NBA match at any time.

- (Poland) Michał Chyliński
- (Poland) Karol Gruszecki
- (Poland) Andrzej Pluta
- (Poland) Piotr Szczotka
- (Belgium) Tim Lambrecht
- (Republic of the Congo) Junior Etou
- (Lithuania) Donatas Sabeckis
- (Lithuania) Augenijus Vaškys
- (Latvia) Aigars Šķēle
- (North Macedonia) Bojan Trajkovski
- (Senegal) Cheikh Mbodj
- (United States) Cedric Bozeman
- (United States) Antonio Burks
- (United States) Billy Garrett Jr.
- (United States) God Shammgod

== Season by season ==
Season	Tier	League	Pos	Polish Cup	European competitions	
2007–08	1	PLK	10th			
2008–09	1	PLK	6th		3 EuroChallenge	RS
2009–10	1	PLK	8th			
2010–11	1	PLK	3rd			
2011–12	1	PLK	5th			
2012–13	1	PLK	6th			
2013–14	1	PLK	6th			
2014–15	1	PLK	3rd	Semifinalist		
2015–16	1	PLK	3rd	Semifinalist		
2016–17	1	PLK	4th			
2016–17	1	PLK	17th			
2018–19	2	I Liga				
2019–20	2	I Liga				
2020–21	2	I Liga	1st			
2021–22	1	PLK	4th	Quarterfinalist		
2022–23	1	PLK	6th		4 FIBA Europe Cup	QR2
2023–24	1	PLK	11th	Quarterfinalist		
2024–25	1	PLK	6th			
2025–26	1	PLK	14th			

== Logos ==
Energa Czarni Słupsk
(2005–2015)

== Honours ==
- Polish Basketball League:

Third place (4): 2005–06, 2010–11, 2014–15, 2015–16
