= Hala Gryfia =

Arena in Słupsk, Poland

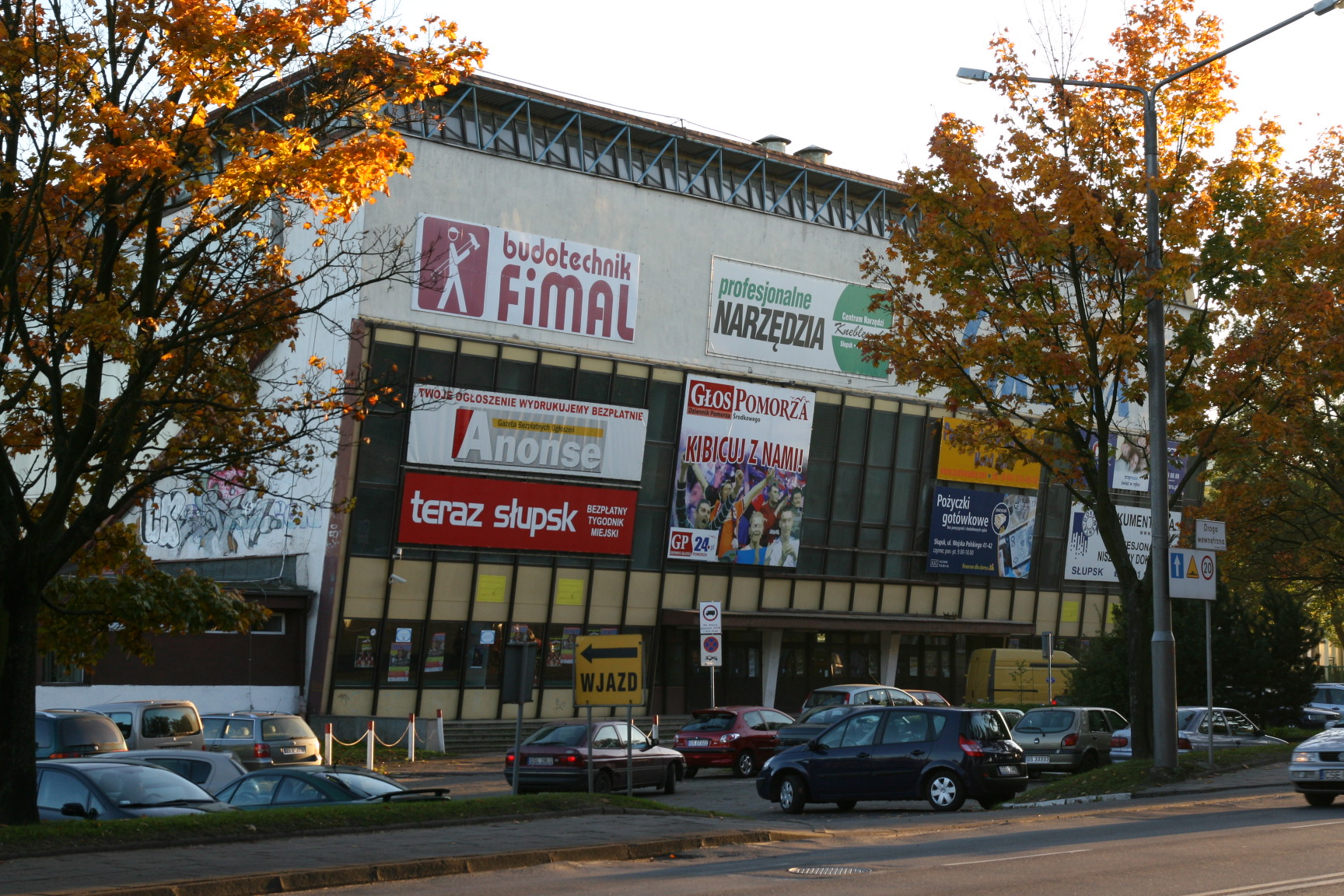
- Hala Gryfia covered with advertisements
- Interactive map of Hala Gryfia
- Address: ul. Szczecinska 99
- Location: Słupsk
- Coordinates: 54°27′41″N 17°00′24″E
- Capacity: 2,249
- Type: Stadium

Construction
- Built: July 1982

Hala Gryfia is an arena in Słupsk, Poland. It is primarily used for basketball. Hala Gryfia holds 2,500 people and hosts the home games of Czarni Słupsk. It was built in 1982.
