= Gdynia Arena =

Indoor arena in Gdynia, Poland

Coordinates: 54°29′56″N 18°31′53″E

- Polsat Plus Arena Gdynia

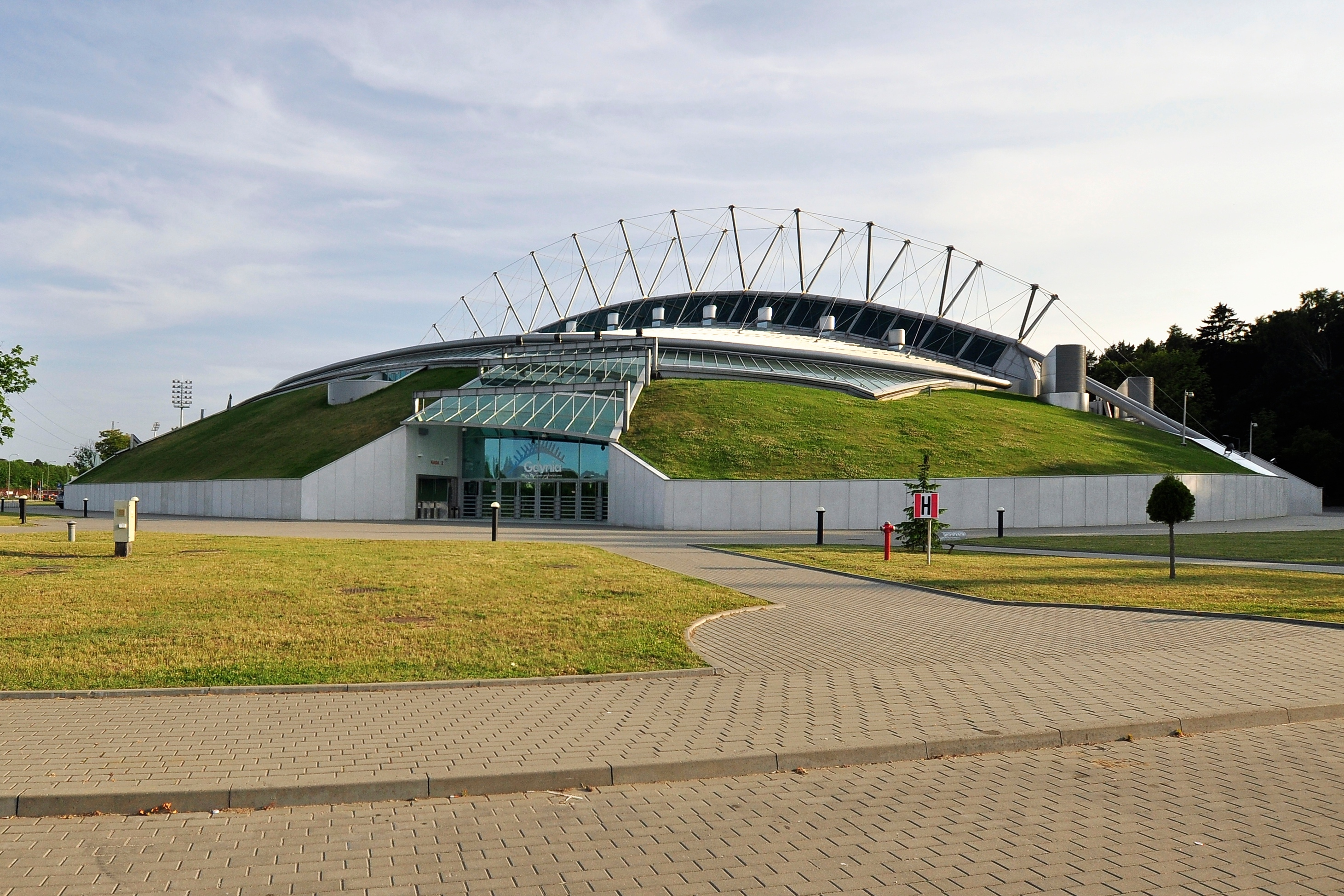
- Interactive map of Gdynia Arena
- Location: Gdynia, Poland
- Capacity: 5,500

Construction
- Opened: December 22, 2008

Tenant
- Arka Gdynia (basketball)

Gdynia Arena (known in Poland as Hala Sportowo-Widowiskowa Gdynia and for sponsorship reasons as the Polsat Plus Arena Gdynia since August 2022) is an indoor arena that is located in Gdynia, Poland. It is the home of the professional Euroleague Basketball club Arka Gdynia. The arena opened on December 22, 2008, and it has a seating capacity of 5,500 for basketball games.

The arena hosted the final draw of the 2019 FIFA U-20 World Cup.

From 21 May 2021, the stadium is called Polsat Plus Arena Gdynia. The city's contract with the media and telecommunications companies Polsat and Plus was concluded for four years.

== See also ==
- List of indoor arenas in Poland
- Sport in Poland
