= Turów Zgorzelec =

- Leagues: PLK
- Founded: 1964
- History: List: KS Turów (1964–1965) KS Turów Zgorzelec (1965–2006) KKS Turów Zgorzelec S.A. (2006–2018) KS Turów Zgorzelec (2019-)
- Arena: Turów Arena
- Capacity: 3,500
- Location: Zgorzelec, Poland
- Championships: 1 Polish Championship; 1 Polish Supercup
- Website: http://ksturow.eu
| Home | Away |

Turów Zgorzelec (officially PGE GiEK Turów Zgorzelec for sponsorship reasons) is a Polish a basketball team based in Zgorzelec.

The club played in the Polish League (PLK) and won the Polish championship once, in the 2013–14 season. The club was sponsored by the PGE Group, and they are also the club's name sponsor as well but in 2018, the club withdrew after the PGE Group pulled back their sponsoring. The club continues to play in the lower leagues.

The club's home court for domestic Polish League games is the Turów Arena.

== History ==
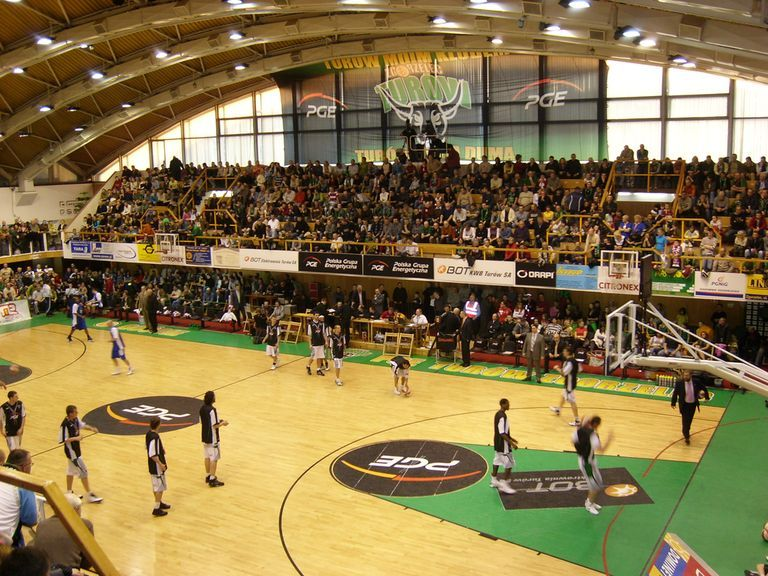
Turów playing in the Sports Centre in 2008

The original athletic club was founded in 1948, as an athletic association with a football club in Bogatynia, called KS Miner Turoszów. In 1961, the club changed its name to Sports Club Turów. In June 1964, the athletic club added a sailing team. Then also in 1964, the athletic club formed the men's basketball section. Then in 1965, the club moved from Bogatynia to Zgorzelec.

The club was promoted to the Polish Premier League in 1978. After one season in the top division, Turów played in the lower Polish leagues for 25 years. The club won the Polish second division title in 2004, and was them promoted to up to the Polish first division once again.

In 2006, the basketball section took the name of KKS Turów Zgorzelec S.A, and the sailing club became a separate sports association called Sports Club Turów Zgorzelec. In 2007, the club reached a sponsorship agreement with PGE Group, and thus the club's name sponsor has been PGE Turów Zgorzelec since then.

Between 2007 and 2013, the club had 5 Polish League Finals appearances in the Tauron Basket Liga. However, the team lost in each of those finals appearances against Prokom Trefl Sopot / Asseco Prokom Gdynia.

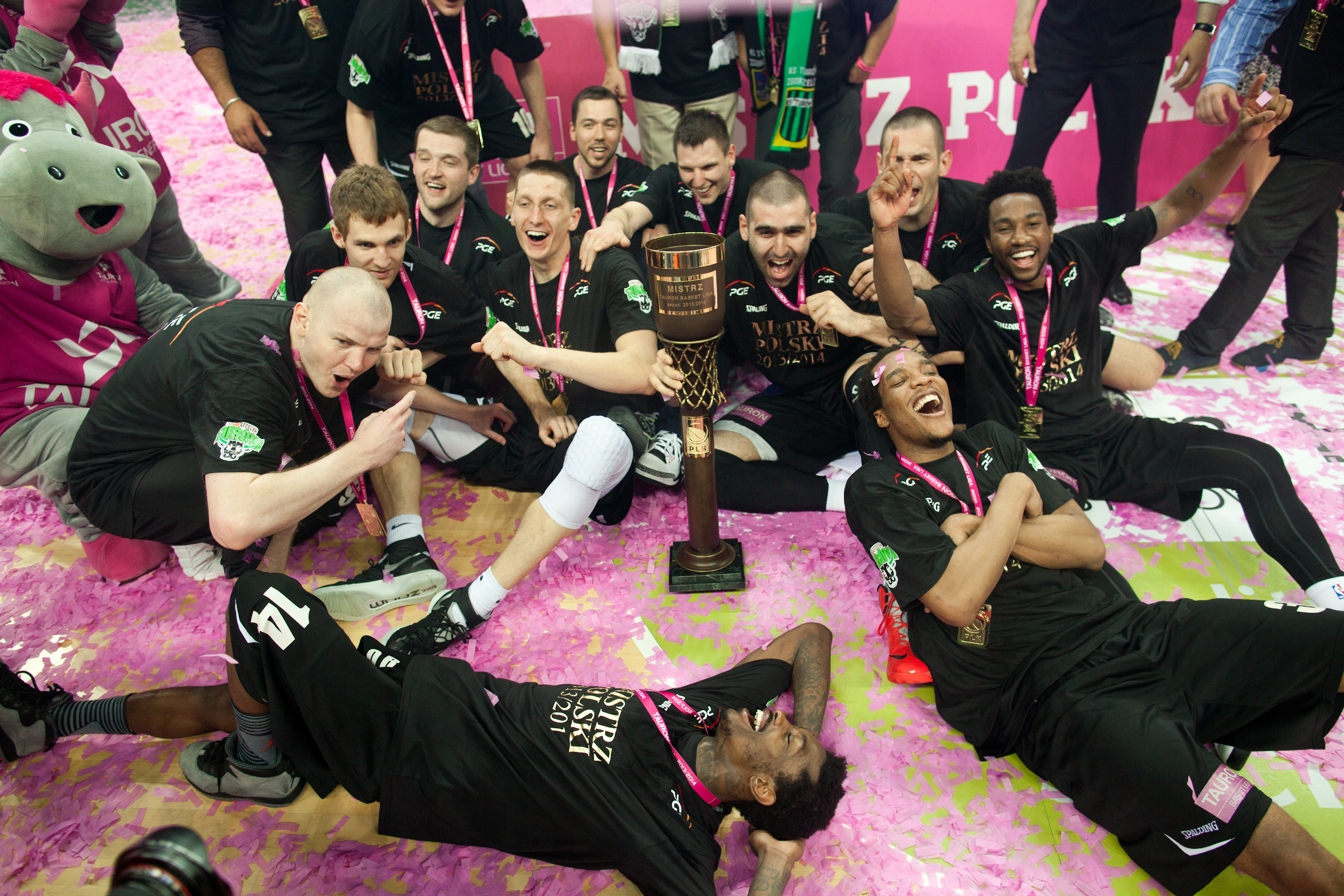
Turów players celebrating winning the Polish Champions' title in 2014

In 2014, Turów won the Tauron Basket Liga championship, after they defeated Zielona Góra in the Finals 4–2. J.P. Prince led the team the whole season, and was rewarded with the PLK Most Valuable Player award. The 34-year-old veteran Filip Dylewicz was chosen as the 2014 PLK Finals MVP.

To add to the positive developments around the club, the team qualified for the 2014–15 Euroleague season. It would be the first appearance of the club on this level, and Turów is just the fourth Polish club to ever play in the Euroleague.

In July 2018, Turów withdrew from the PLK after PGE Group stopped financing the club. The club since restarted from the lowest, Third Division.

== Arenas ==
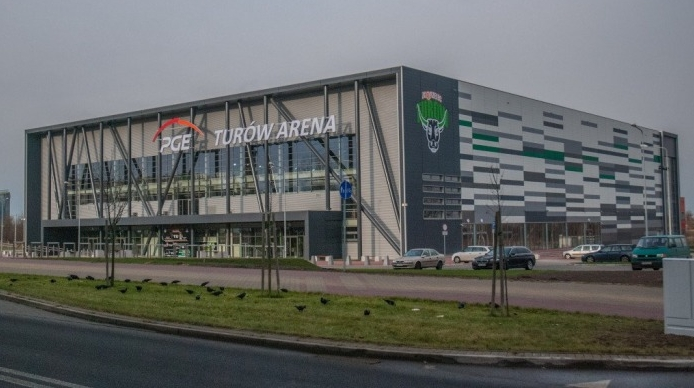
Turów Arena, home venue of the team

Turów Zgorzelec played its domestic Polish League home games at the 1,500 seat capacity Centrum Sportowe. For European cup games, which require arenas with larger seating capacities, like the Eurocup (3,000 seating minimum requirement) and the Euroleague (5,000 seating minimum requirement), the club could play its home games at either the 6,080 seat CRS Hala Zielona Góra or the 9,000 seat Tipsport Arena.

In 2014, Turów opened the PGE Turów Arena, its new home court with a capacity for 3,500 people.

== Season by season ==
| Season | Tier | League | Pos. | Polish Cup | Other leagues | | European competitions | |
|---|---|---|---|---|---|---|---|---|
| 2005–06 | 1 | PLK | 7th | | | | | |
| 2006–07 | 1 | PLK | 2nd | Semifinalist | | | | |
| 2007–08 | 1 | PLK | 2nd | Semifinalist | | | 2 ULEB Cup | QF |
| 2008–09 | 1 | PLK | 2nd | Semifinalist | | | 2 Eurocup | RS |
| 2009–10 | 1 | PLK | 5th | Runner–up | | | 2 Eurocup | RS |
| 2010–11 | 1 | PLK | 2nd | Semifinalist | | | | |
| 2011–12 | 1 | PLK | 4th | Semifinalist | | | 2 Eurocup | RS |
| 2012–13 | 1 | PLK | 2nd | Semifinalist | United League | 8th | | |
| 2013–14 | 1 | PLK | 1st | Runner–up | United League | 7th | | |
| 2014–15 | 1 | PLK | 2nd | Quarterfinalist | | | 1 Euroleague | RS |
| 2014–15 | 1 | PLK | 2nd | Quarterfinalist | | | 2 Eurocup | EF |
| 2015–16 | 1 | PLK | 9th | | | | 3 FIBA Europe Cup | RS |
| 2016–17 | 1 | PLK | 10th | | | | | |
| 2017–18 | 1 | PLK | 8th | Semifinalist | | | | |

== Honours ==
- Polish Basketball League: (1)
  - 2013–14
- Polish Supercup: (1)
  - 2014
- Prague, Czech Republic Invitational Game: (1)
  - 2014

== Notable players ==
Note: Flags indicate national team eligibility at FIBA-sanctioned events. Players may hold other non-FIBA nationalities not displayed.

Criteria

To appear in this section a player must have either:

- Set a club record or won an individual award while at the club
- Played at least one official international match for their national team at any time
- Played at least one official NBA match at any time.

- (Poland) Michał Chyliński
- (Poland) Olek Czyż
- (Poland) Thomas Kelati
- (Poland) David Logan
- (Poland) Andrzej Pluta
- (Poland) J.P. Prince
- (Poland) Krzysztof Roszyk
- (Poland) Dominik Tomczyk
- (Poland) Robert Witka
- (Poland) Adam Wójcik
- (France) Yann Mollinari
- (Lithuania) Giedrius Gustas
- (Lithuania) Denis Krestinin
- (Puerto Rico) Andrés Rodríguez
- (Slovenia) Dragiša Drobnjak
- (United States) Michael Ansley
- (United States) Tyus Edney
- (United States) Justin Gray
- (United States) David Jackson
- (United States) Chris Johnson
- (United States) Jarryd Loyd
- (United States) Kevinn Pinkney
- (United States) Torey Thomas 1 season: '10-'11
- (United States) TJ Thompson
- (United States) Brandon Wallace
- (United States) Michael Wright 1 season: '09-'10
