= 2025 Polish Basketball Supercup =

2025 Pekao S.A. Superpuchar Polski
Tournament details
- Arena: OSiR Bemowo; Warsaw, Poland
- Dates: 27–28 September 2025

Final positions
- Champions: PGE Start Lublin
- Runners-up: Energa Trefl Sopot
- Third place: Legia Warsaw / Górnik Zamek Książ Wałbrzych

Awards and statistics
- MVP: (United States) Tevin Mack

The 2025 Polish Basketball Supercup (Polish: Superpuchar Polski 2025), also known as Pekao S.A. Superpuchar 2025 for sponsorship reasons, is the 20th edition of the super cup tournament, organized the Polish Basketball League (PLK). For the first time, Warsaw will host the Supercup.

It is the second edition of a new format Supercup with four teams participating, instead of just two as it was previously. Tournament will be played between not only the champions and the Polish Cup winners but also the other two medalists of the Polish league from the recently concluded season.

== Participant teams ==
Team	Home city	Head coach	Status
Legia Warsaw	Warsaw	(Estonia) Heiko Rannula	PLK champion
Górnik Zamek Książ Wałbrzych	Wałbrzych	(Poland) Andrzej Adamek	Polish Cup champion
PGE Start Lublin	Lublin	(Poland) Wojciech Kamiński	PLK silver medalist
Trefl Sopot	Sopot	(Finland) Mikko Larkas	PLK bronze medalist

== Final Four ==
Semifinals; 27 September
PGE Start Lublin	80
Górnik Zamek Książ Wałbrzych	66
Legia Warsaw	82
Energa Trefl Sopot	96

Final; 28 September
PGE Start Lublin	82
Energa Trefl Sopot	77
