= 2023 Polish Basketball Cup =

59th edition of Poland's national cup competition for men basketball teams

Polish Basketball Cup
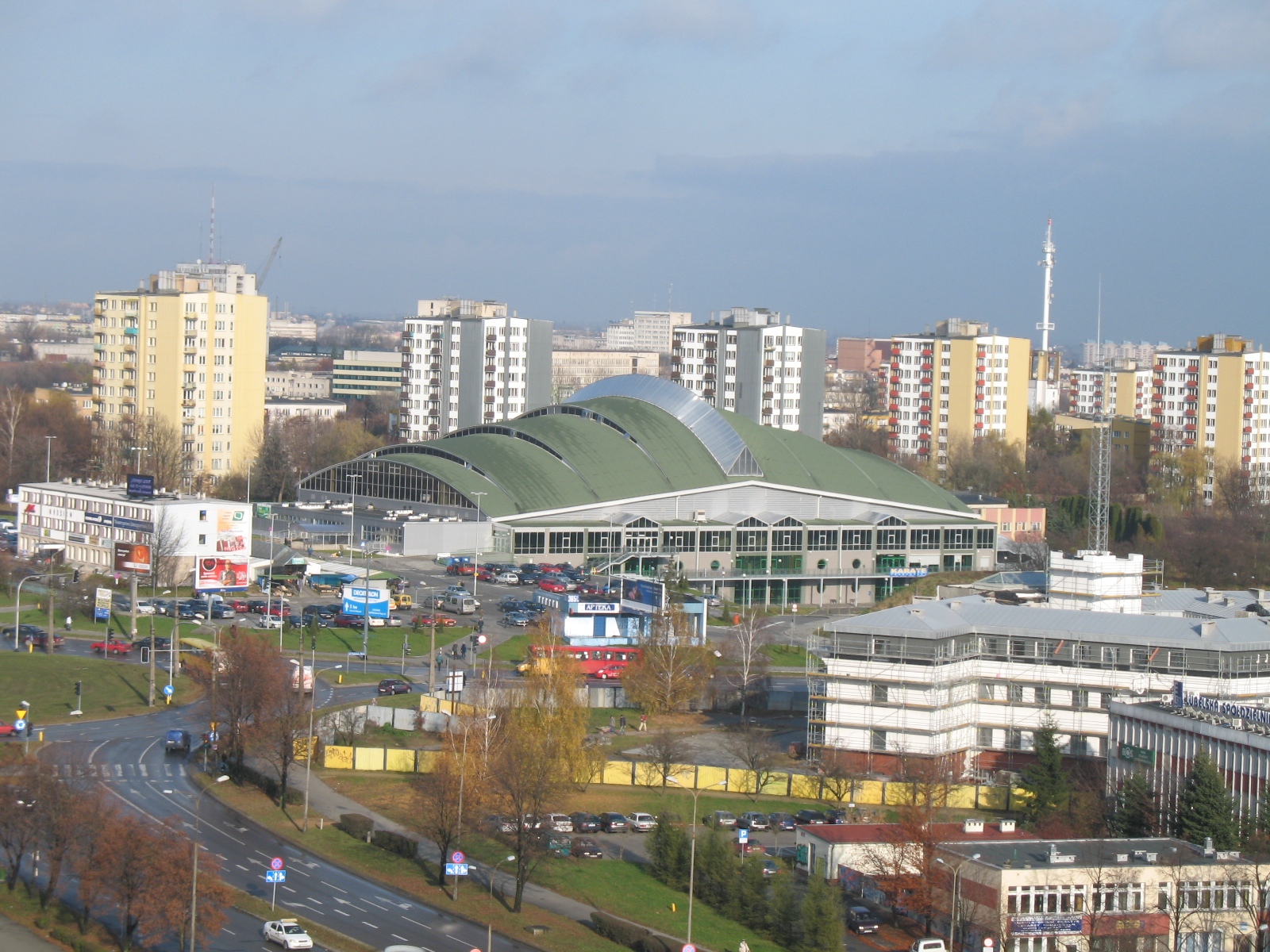
- The Globus, venue for the tournament
- Season: 2022–23
- Duration: 16–19 February
- Games played: 7
- Teams: 8

Regular season
- Season MVP: (United States) Garrett Nevels

Finals
- Champions: Trefl Sopot (3rd title)
- Runners-up: Polski Cukier Start Lublin
- Semi-finalists: Anwil Włocławek, Spójnia Stargard

The 2023 Suzuki Polish Basketball Cup (Polish: Puchar Polski 2023) was the 60th edition of Poland's national cup competition for men basketball teams. It is managed by the Polish Basketball League (PLK) and was held in Lublin, in the Globus.

== Qualified teams ==
The eight participants qualified for the tournament after the first half of the 2022–23 PLK season. The highest-placed three teams joined Start Lublin and would play against the four low-seeded teams in the quarter-finals. As host of the tournament, Start Lublin gained automatic qualification.

Hosts
Polski Cukier Start Lublin	Seeded

Pos	Team	Pld	W	L	PF	PA	PD	Pts	Seeding
1	Śląsk Wrocław	15	14	1	1333	1171	+162	29	Seeded
2	BM Slam Stal Ostrów Wlkp.	15	11	4	1302	1174	+128	26	Seeded
3	King Szczecin	15	10	5	1292	1233	+59	25	Seeded
4	Trefl Sopot	15	10	5	1251	1211	+40	25	Unseeded
5	Legia Warszawa	15	9	6	1171	1141	+30	24	Unseeded
6	Anwil Włocławek	15	8	7	1211	1161	+50	23	Unseeded
7	Spójnia Stargard	15	8	7	1229	1208	+21	23	Unseeded

Source: PLK

== Draw ==
The draw was held on 8 July 2022 in Lublin at Lublin Conference Center.

== Bracket ==
Quarterfinals; 16–17 February
King Szczecin	87
Spójnia Stargard	92
Polski Cukier Start Lublin	87
Legia Warszawa	86
BM Stal Ostrów Wlkp.	80
Anwil Włocławek	89
Śląsk Wrocław	70
Trefl Sopot	79

Semifinals; 18 February
Spójnia Stargard	86
Polski Cukier Start Lublin	109
Anwil Włocławek	91
Trefl Sopot	93

Final; 19 February
Polski Cukier Start Lublin	80
Trefl Sopot	91

== Quarterfinals ==
16 February 2023	King Szczecin	87–92	Spójnia Stargard	Lublin
18:00 CET (UTC+01:00)	Scoring by quarter: 18–20, 16–31, 21–13, 32–28
Polsat Sport	Pts: Cuthbertson 18; Rebs: Cuthbertson 8 Asts: Mazurczak 9 PIR: Cuthbertson 27	Boxscore	Pts: Penava 20; Rebs: Benson 10; Asts: Fortson 9 PIR: Penava 26	Arena: Globus; Attendance: 800; Referees: Marek Maliszewski, Dariusz Zapolski, Maciej Krupiński

16 February 2023	Polski Cukier Start Lublin	87–86	Legia Warszawa	Lublin
20:30 CET (UTC+01:00)	Scoring by quarter: 17–15, 25–20, 24–19, 21–32
Polsat Sport	Pts: Melvin 18; Rebs: Čavars 11; Asts: Smith 10; PIR: Čavars, Smith 23	Boxscore	Pts: Vinales 33; Rebs: Leslie 11; Asts: Vinales 6 PIR: Vinales 29	Arena: Globus; Attendance: 1,215; Referees: Tomasz Trawicki, Łukasz Jankowski, Bartłomiej Kucharski

17 February 2023	BM Stal Ostrów Wlkp.	80–89	Anwil Włocławek	Lublin
18:00 CET (UTC+01:00)	Scoring by quarter: 25–22, 22–16, 12–23, 21–28
Polsat Sport	Pts: Đurišić 18; Rebs: Đurišić 8 Asts: Perkins 8 PIR: Đurišić 23	Boxscore	Pts: Williams 17; Rebs: Williams 11; Asts: Łączyński 7 PIR: Williams 28	Arena: Globus; Attendance: 400; Referees: Marcin Kowalski, Tomasz Trawicki, Mariusz Nawrocki

17 February 2023	Śląsk Wrocław	70–79	Trefl Sopot	Lublin
20:30 CET (UTC+01:00)	Scoring by quarter: 15–24, 23–15, 19–24, 13–16
Polsat Sport	Pts: Martin 13; Rebs: Parakhouski, Ramljak 5 Asts: Martin 4 PIR: Martin 15	Boxscore	Pts: Nevels 30; Rebs: Gordon 11; Asts: Wells 4 PIR: Nevels 33	Arena: Globus; Attendance: 700; Referees: Dariusz Zapolski, Michał Chrakowiecki, Michał Kuzia

== Semifinals ==
18 February 2023	Spójnia Stargard	86–109	Polski Cukier Start Lublin	Lublin
15:00 CET (UTC+01:00)	Scoring by quarter: 19–27, 25–26, 16–26, 26–30
Polsat Sport	Pts: Mathews 19; Rebs: Clarke 15; Asts: Fortson 5 PIR: Gruszecki 16	Boxscore	Pts: Melvin 24; Rebs: Čavars 7 Asts: Smith 15; PIR: Čavars, Melvin	Arena: Globus; Attendance: 2,000; Referees: Dariusz Zapolski, Michał Chrakowiecki, Bartłomiej Kucharski

18 February 2023	Anwil Włocławek	91–93(OT)	Trefl Sopot	Lublin
19:00 CET (UTC+01:00)	Scoring by quarter: 19–15, 15–17, 16–20, 16–14, Overtime: 25–27
Polsat Sport	Pts: Moore 15; Rebs: Sanders, Williams 7 Asts: Sanders 6 PIR: Sanders 21	Boxscore	Pts: Nevels 30; Rebs: Nevels 13; Asts: Pluta 6 PIR: Nevels 37	Arena: Globus; Attendance: 700; Referees: Tomasz Trawicki, Łukasz Jankowski, Karol Nowak

== Finals ==
19 February 2023	Polski Cukier Start Lublin	80–91	Trefl Sopot	Lublin
18:00 CET (UTC+01:00)	Scoring by quarter: 23–18, 22–29, 20–23, 15–21
Polsat Sport	Pts: DeVoe, Smith 15; Rebs: Krasuski, Smith 6 Asts: Smith 7 PIR: Melvin 20	Boxscore	Pts: Nevels 27; Rebs: Radić 9 Asts: Wells 9 PIR: Nevels 34	Arena: Globus; Attendance: 2,500; Referees: Marcin Kowalski, Dariusz Zapolski, Bartłomiej Kucharski

Starters:			Pts	Reb	Ast
PG	11	(United States) Scoochie Smith	15	6	7
SG	10	(United States) Gabe DeVoe	15	2	4
SF	3	(Poland) Mateusz Dziemba	8	5	1
PF	2	(United States) Cleveland Melvin	14	3	5
C	15	(Latvia) Klāvs Čavars	12	5	0
Reserves:					
PG	0	(Poland) Kacper Świtacz	DNP		
F	1	(United States) Troy Barnies	11	3	0
G	7	(Poland) Bartłomiej Pelczar	0	0	0
SG	9	(Poland) Norbert Ziółko	DNP		
SF	12	(Poland) Sebastian Walda	DNP		
G	17	(Poland) Wiktor Kępka	DNP		
SF	21	(Poland) Michał Krasuski	5	2	2
Head coach:
(Polish Basketball Federation) Artur Gronek

Start Lublin	Trefl Sopot

Start Lublin	Statistics	Trefl Sopot
22/33 (66.7%)	2 point field goals	26/42 (61.9%)
9/27 (33.3%)	3 point field goals	10/30 (33.3%)
9/15 (60%)	Free throws	9/11 (81.8%)
6	Offensive rebounds	11
26	Defensive rebounds	26
32	Total rebounds	37
19	Assists	24
5	Steals	9
14	Turnovers	7
4	Blocks	3

Starters:			Pts	Reb	Ast
PG	22	(United States) Cameron Wells	11	3	9
SG	1	(United States) Garrett Nevels	27	7	6
SF	23	(Poland) Michał Kolenda	4	3	1
PF	15	(Poland) Jarosław Zyskowski	26	4	3
C	41	(Croatia) Ivica Radić	4	9	0
Reserves:					
SG	0	(Poland) Jan Malesa	DNP		
G	3	(Poland) Andrzej Pluta Jr.	0	2	3
F/C	6	(Latvia) Rolands Freimanis	5	5	0
PF	7	(Poland) Jakub Urbaniak	DNP		
G/F	11	(Poland) Błażej Kulikowski	0	0	0
G	13	(Belgium) Jean Salumu	8	2	1
C	25	(United States) Wesley Gordon	6	2	1
Head coach:
(Croatian Basketball Federation) Žan Tabak

2023 Polish Basketball Cup Winners
Trefl Sopot
(3rd title)

== See also ==
- 2022–23 PLK season
