= Raymond Cowels =

American basketball player (born 1990)

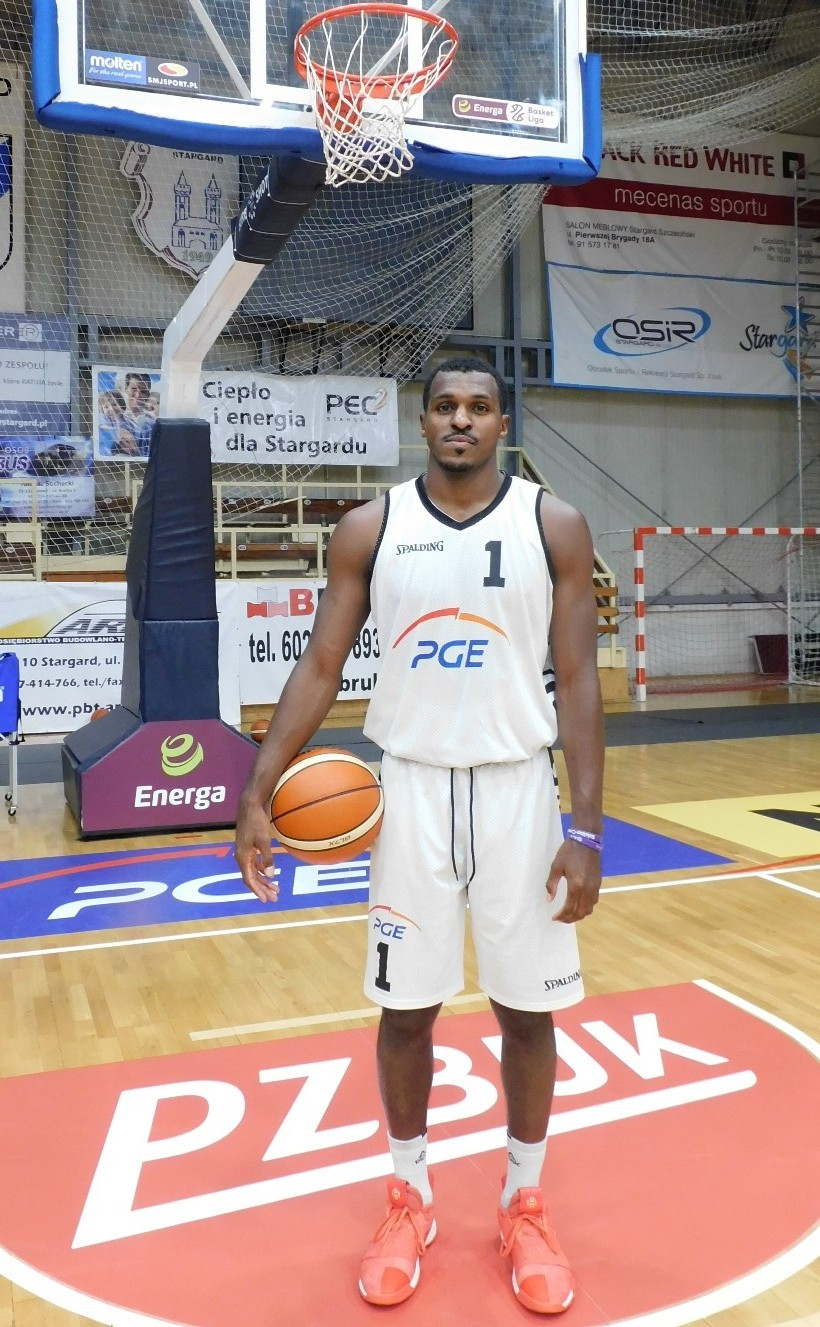
- Cowels with Spójnia Stargard in September 2019

Free Agent
- Position: Shooting guard / small forward

Personal information
- Born: November 18, 1990 (age 35) Chicago, Illinois, U.S.
- Listed height: 6 ft 4 in (1.93 m)
- Listed weight: 206 lb (93 kg)

Career information
- High school: Hopkins (Minnetonka, Minnesota)
- College: Santa Clara (2009–2013)
- NBA draft: 2013: undrafted
- Playing career: 2013–present

Career history
- 2013–2014: Den Helder Kings
- 2016: Nelson Giants
- 2016–2017: Helsinki Seagulls
- 2017–2018: Hyères-Toulon
- 2018: Canterbury Rams
- 2018–2019: Boulazac
- 2019–2021: Spójnia Stargard
- 2021: Poitiers Basket 86
- 2021–2022: Legia Warsaw
- 2022–2023: Falco KC Szombathely
- 2023–2024: Legia Warszawa
- 2024–2025: MKS Dąbrowa Górnicza
- 2025–2026: Trefl Sopot

Career highlights
- NBL All-Star Five (2016); Hungarian Cup winner (2023); Hungarian League champion (2023); Polish Cup winner (2024)

Raymond Cowels III (born November 18, 1990) is an American professional basketball player who most recently played for Trefl Sopot of the Polish Basketball League (PLK). He played college basketball for the Santa Clara Broncos before playing professionally in the Netherlands, New Zealand, Finland, and France.

== High school career ==
Cowels attended Hopkins High School in Minnetonka, Minnesota where he led his team to 128 wins with only six losses while winning two state championships in 2006 and 2009, and earning All-State honors twice and all-conference three times. As a sophomore in 2006–07, he averaged 11 points and six rebounds per game as Hopkins made it to the section championship. As a junior in 2007–08, he averaged 17 points and seven rebounds per game in leading Hopkins 27–2 record. In November 2008, Cowels signed a National Letter of Intent to play college basketball for Santa Clara University. He went on to average 16 points and six rebounds as a senior in 2008–09.

== College career ==
In his freshman season at Santa Clara, Cowels played all 32 games with 11 starting assignments while averaging 7.3 points, 2.2 rebounds and 1.3 assists in 24.0 minutes per game. He finished in the top 10 of five categories of the SCU freshman records, including three-pointers made (46, 5th); three-pointers attempted (146, 2nd); free throw percentage (.787, 3rd); steals (26, 10th); and minutes played (769, 9th). In his sophomore season, Cowels' minutes and production both decreased as he averaged just 5.4 points, 1.8 rebounds and 15.3 minutes in 37 games and only nine starts. In his junior season, Cowels was the only player to start every game as he led the team and tied for No. 5 on the Bronco single-season list in three-point field goal percentage (43.1 percent). In 30 games, he averaged 10.1 points, 3.5 rebounds and 1.0 assists in 27.7 minutes per game. In his senior season, Cowels became the 31st player in school history to score 1,000 career points on February 16 with a corner three in the second half against Pepperdine. In 38 games (all starts), he averaged 9.4 points, 4.3 rebounds ad 1.5 steals in 26.2 minutes per game.

== Professional career ==
On July 18, 2013, Cowels signed a one-year deal with the Den Helder Kings of the Dutch Basketball League. In 40 games for Den Helder in 2013–14, he averaged 10.1 points, 3.7 rebounds and 1.1 steals per game.

On November 1, 2014, Cowels was selected with the final pick in the 2014 NBA Development League Draft by the Reno Bighorns. He was later traded to the Maine Red Claws on draft night. On November 10, he was waived by the Red Claws prior to the start of the regular season.

In July 2015, Cowels joined the Memphis Grizzlies for the 2015 Orlando Summer League, helping the team win the tournament championship. In five games for the Grizzlies, he averaged 3.4 points and 2.0 rebounds per game.

On December 17, 2015, Cowels signed with the Halifax Hurricanes of the National Basketball League of Canada. However, six days later, he was released by Halifax prior to the start of the 2015–16 season.

On January 29, 2016, Cowels signed with the Nelson Giants for the 2016 New Zealand NBL season. He scored 30 points or more six times during the season, including a season-high 35 points to go with 11 rebounds in a 107–97 win over the Canterbury Rams on April 30. He subsequently earned Player of the Week honors for Round 8. Cowels appeared in all 18 games for the Giants in 2016, averaging 25.7 points (ranked second in league), 5.0 rebounds, 2.2 assists and 1.8 steals per game. He subsequently earned NBL All-Star Five honors.

On August 3, 2016, Cowels signed with the Helsinki Seagulls of Finland for the 2016–17 Korisliiga season. In 45 games, he averaged 14.7 points, 5.7 rebounds and 1.4 assists per game.

In July 2017, Cowels joined the Memphis Grizzlies for the 2017 NBA Summer League. He later joined French team Hyères-Toulon for the 2017–18 season. In 34 games for Hyères-Toulon, he averaged 15.1 points, 3.5 rebounds, 1.2 assists and 1.3 steals per game.

In July 2018, Cowels signed with the Canterbury Rams as a short-term replacement for Xavier Thames, thus returning to New Zealand for a second stint. He played three games for parting ways with the Rams. That same month, he signed with French team Boulazac Basket Dordogne.

On September 18, 2019, he has signed with Spójnia Stargard of the PLK. Cowels averaged 18.3 points, 5.3 rebounds, 1.7 assists and 1.3 steals per game. He re-signed with the team on September 20, 2020.

On June 1, 2021, he has signed with Poitiers Basket 86 of the Pro B.

On June 22, 2021, he has signed with Legia Warsaw of the PLK.

On July 18, 2023, he signed with Legia Warszawa of the Polish Basketball League for a second stint.

On July 18, 2025, he signed with Trefl Sopot of the Polish Basketball League (PLK).

== Career Statistics ==
=== College statistics ===
Year	Team	GP	GS	MPG	FG%	3P%	FT%	RPG	APG	SPG	BPG	PPG
2009–10	Santa Clara	32	11	24.0	.318	.315	.787	2.2	1.3	.8	.1	7.3
2010–11	Santa Clara	37	9	15.3	.366	.354	.815	1.8	.6	.2	.2	5.4
2011–12	Santa Clara	30	30	27.7	.424	.431	.744	3.5	1.0	.8	.2	10.1
2012–13	Santa Clara	38	38	26.2	.408	.390	.865	4.3	.5	1.5	.2	9.4

== Personal ==
Cowels is the son of Raymond Cowels, Jr. and Wanda Jackson, and has four siblings: Rueben, Carl, Kayla and Cara.
