= 2024 Polish Basketball Cup =

60th edition of Poland's national cup competition for men basketball teams

Polish Basketball Cup
- Season: 2023–24
- Duration: 15–18 February
- Games played: 7
- Teams: 8

Finals
- Champions: Legia Warsaw (3rd title)
- Runners-up: BM Stal Ostrów Wielkopolski

Awards
- Final MVP: (United States) Aric Holman

The 2024 Bank Pekao Polish Basketball Cup (Polish: Puchar Polski 2024) was the 61st edition of Poland's national cup competition for men basketball teams. It is managed by the Polish Basketball League (PLK) and will be held in Sosnowiec, in the Arena Sosnowiec.

== Qualified teams ==
The eight participants qualified for the tournament after the first half of the 2023–24 PLK season. The highest-placed four teams and would play against the four low-seeded teams in the quarter-finals.

Pos	Team	Pld	W	L	PF	PA	PD	Pts	Seeding
1	Anwil Włocławek	15	14	1	1310	1124	+186	29	Seeded
2	Trefl Sopot	15	10	5	1277	1203	+74	25	Seeded
3	BM Slam Stal Ostrów Wielkopolski	15	9	6	1282	1165	+117	24	Seeded
4	Polski Cukier Pszczółka Start Lublin	15	9	6	1320	1319	+1	24	Seeded
5	King Szczecin	15	8	7	1317	1249	+68	23	Unseeded
6	Twarde Pierniki Toruń	15	8	7	1223	1206	+17	23	Unseeded
7	Legia Warszawa	15	8	7	1213	1201	+12	23	Unseeded
8	Grupa Sierleccy Czarni Słupsk	15	8	7	1189	1227	−38	23	Unseeded

Source: PLK

== Draw ==
The draw was held on 9 January 2024 in Polsat Sport studio.

== Bracket ==
Quarterfinals; 15–16 February
Polski Cukier Start Lublin	83
Legia Warszawa	112
Trefl Sopot	85
King Szczecin	65
Anwil Włocławek	90
Twarde Pierniki Toruń	89
BM Stal Ostrów Wielkopolski	87
Grupa Sierleccy Czarni Słupsk	82

Semifinals; 17 February
Legia Warszawa	96
Trefl Sopot	81
Anwil Włocławek	85
BM Stal Ostrów Wielkopolski	94

Final; 18 February
Legia Warszawa	94
BM Stal Ostrów Wielkopolski	71

== Quarterfinals ==
15 February 2024	Polski Cukier Start Lublin	83–112	Legia Warszawa	Sosnowiec
18:00 CET (UTC+01:00)	Scoring by quarter: 29–30, 26–26, 10–30, 18–26
Polsat Sport	Pts: Benson 21; Rebs: Wade 10; Asts: O'Reilly 9 PIR: Wade 23	Boxscore	Pts: Cowels 27; Rebs: Holman 9 Asts: Jackson 13; PIR: Vital 36	Arena: Arena Sosnowiec; Attendance: 678; Referees: Dariusz Zapolski, Michał Kuzia, Tomasz Szczurewski

15 February 2024	Trefl Sopot	85–65	King Szczecin	Sosnowiec
20:30 CET (UTC+01:00)	Scoring by quarter: 21–28, 14–14, 33–9, 17–14
Polsat Sport	Pts: Schenk 23; Rebs: Barnes, Váradi 8 Asts: Váradi 4 PIR: Schenk 25	Boxscore	Pts: Woodson 28; Rebs: three players4 Asts: Mazurczak 4 PIR: Woodson 25	Arena: Arena Sosnowiec; Attendance: 523; Referees: Jakub Zamojski, Bartłomiej Kucharski, Tomasz Langowski

16 February 2024	Anwil Włocławek	90–89(OT)	Twarde Pierniki Toruń	Sosnowiec
18:00 CET (UTC+01:00)	Scoring by quarter: 18–11, 18–27, 19–17, 26–26, Overtime: 9–8
Polsat Sport	Pts: Kyzlink 21; Rebs: Petrasek 10; Asts: Kyzlink 5 PIR: Kyzlink 21	Boxscore	Pts: Smith 22; Rebs: Vucić 8 Asts: Filipović 8 PIR: Filipović 22	Arena: Arena Sosnowiec; Attendance: 1,373; Referees: Piotr Pastusiak, Łukasz Jankowski, Marcin Koralewski

16 February 2024	BM Stal Ostrów Wielkopolski	87–82	Grupa Sierleccy Czarni Słupsk	Sosnowiec
20:30 CET (UTC+01:00)	Scoring by quarter: 34–20, 18–22, 14–23, 21–17
Polsat Sport	Pts: Beliauskas 28; Rebs: Brembly, Mikalauskas 6 Asts: Chatman 5 PIR: Beliauskas 34	Boxscore	Pts: Griciunas, Jankowski 21; Rebs: Griciunas 12; Asts: Caffey 7 PIR: Griciunas 29	Arena: Arena Sosnowiec; Attendance: 844; Referees: Wojciech Liszka, Michał Proc, Mateusz Skorek

== Semifinals ==
17 February 2024	Legia Warszawa	96–81	Trefl Sopot	Sosnowiec
15:00 CET (UTC+01:00)	Scoring by quarter: 20–22, 31–25, 21–17, 24–17
Polsat Sport	Pts: Holman 24; Rebs: Holman 8 Asts: Vital 9 PIR: Holman 23	Boxscore	Pts: Best, van Vliet 15; Rebs: Best 8 Asts: Best 6 PIR: Best 21	Arena: Arena Sosnowiec; Attendance: 1,882; Referees: Marcin Kowalski, Łukasz Jankowski, Bartłomiej Kucharski

17 February 2024	Anwil Włocławek	85–94	BM Stal Ostrów Wielkopolski	Sosnowiec
19:00 CET (UTC+01:00)	Scoring by quarter: 19–23, 20–26, 29–16, 17–29
Polsat Sport	Pts: Kyzlink 30; Rebs: Garbacz 6 Asts: Sanders 7 PIR: Kyzlink 21	Boxscore	Pts: Siliņš 21; Rebs: Siliņš 7 Asts: Chatman 6 PIR: Siliņš 29	Arena: Arena Sosnowiec; Attendance: 2,259; Referees: Jakub Zamojski, Michał Proc, Michał Kuzia

== Final ==
18 February 2024	Legia Warszawa	94–71	BM Stal Ostrów Wielkopolski	Sosnowiec
17:30 CET (UTC+01:00)	Scoring by quarter: 18–20, 22–21, 25–14, 29–16
Polsat Sport	Pts: Jackson 24; Rebs: Sobin 9 Asts: Jackson, Kolenda 4 PIR: Holman 31	Boxscore	Pts: Đurišić 24; Rebs: Đurišić 7 Asts: Beliauskas 5 PIR: Đurišić 25	Arena: Arena Sosnowiec; Attendance: 2,712; Referees: Piotr Pastusiak, Wojciech Liszka, Bartłomiej Kucharski

Starters:			Pts	Reb	Ast
PG	3	(United States) Loren Jackson	24	2	4
SG	1	(United States) Christian Vital	17	6	2
SF	23	(Poland) Michał Kolenda	15	2	4
PF	35	(United States) Aric Holman	23	8	1
C	8	(Croatia) Josip Sobin	4	9	0
Reserves:					
G	4	(Poland) Marcin Wieluński	DNP		
PF	14	(Poland) Grzegorz Kulka	0	0	0
F/C	15	(Poland) Adam Linowski	DNP		
SG	11	(United States) Raymond Cowels	4	1	3
G	42	(Poland) Marcel Ponitka	5	3	1
F/C	91	(Poland) Dariusz Wyka	2	1	1
Head coach:
(Poland) Wojciech Kamiński

Legia Warszawa	BM Stal Ostrów Wielkopolski

Legia Warszawa	Statistics	BM Stal
15/30 (50.0%)	2 point field goals	17/35 (48.5%)
15/30 (50.0%)	3 point field goals	8/28 (28.5%)
15/30 (50.0%)	Free throws	13/17 (76.4%)
10	Offensive rebounds	14
24	Defensive rebounds	22
34	Total rebounds	36
16	Assists	14
9	Steals	6
10	Turnovers	17
5	Blocks	0

Starters:			Pts	Reb	Ast
PG	6	(Germany) David Brembly	11	2	1
SG	9	(Lithuania) Laurynas Beliauskas	10	3	5
SF	0	(Lithuania) Arūnas Mikalauskas	2	3	3
PF	15	(Latvia) Ojārs Siliņš	13	5	1
C	7	(Poland) Krzysztof Sulima	1	6	1
Reserves:					
PG	3	(United States) Rodney Chatman	3	1	0
F	4	(Poland) Wiktor Sewioł	0	0	0
SG	8	(Poland) Michał Chyliński	7	2	2
G	11	(Poland) Aleksander Załucki	DNP		
PF	42	(Montenegro) Nemanja Đurišić	24	7	1
Head coach:
(Poland) Andrzej Urban

2024 Polish Cup Winners
Legia Warsaw
(3rd title)

== See also ==
- 2023–24 PLK season
