= SLB Player of the Month Award =

The Super League Basketball Player of the Month Award is a monthly award of the United Kingdom's top professional basketball league, Super League Basketball. It is awarded to the league's top-performing player throughout the duration of the month. Each month, the League selects nominees. Then the award is presented to the player who receives the most votes, following a voting process with 40% of the votes coming from fans and 60% of the votes coming from a panel of 3.

== Panel Judges ==
Each judge's vote is worth 20%; they do not need to agree.

As of 6 October 2026, the panel is:

- Daniel Routledge (British Basketball historian/statistician and commentator)
- Drew Lasker (Former British Basketball player and commentator)
- Azania Stewart (Former Women’s British Basketball player and commentator)

== Statistics ==
Player nationalities by national team.

=== Wins by Player ===
	Player	MVP Awards
1.	(United States) Pat Robinson III	3
2.	(United States) RaeQuan Battle	2
2.	(United States) Rodney Chatman	2
4.	(United States) Spencer Johnson	1
4.	(United Kingdom) Flynn Boardman-Raffet	1
4.	(United States) Cam Holden	1
4.	(United States) Charles Thompson	1
4.	(United States) Larry Austin Jr	1
4.	(United States) Mike Okauru	1
4.	(Canada) Aaryn Rai	1
4.	(United States) Makai Ashton-Langford	1

=== Wins by Team ===
	Club	MVP Awards
1.	Leicester Riders	5
2.	Cheshire Phoenix	4
3.	Sheffield Sharks	2
4.	Newcastle Eagles	1
4.	London Lions	1
4.	Manchester Basketball	1

=== Wins by Country ===
	Country	MVP Awards
1.	United States	12
2.	United Kingdom	1
2.	Canada	1

== Winners ==
=== 2024–25 ===
Month	Player	Club	Source
September/October	(United States) Cam Holden	Cheshire Phoenix	
November	(United States) Rodney Chatman	Sheffield Sharks	
December	(United States) Charles Thompson	Leicester Riders	
January	(United States) Larry Austin Jr	Cheshire Phoenix	
February	(United States) Mike Okauru	Newcastle Eagles	
March	(Canada) Aaryn Rai	London Lions	
April	(United States) Makai Ashton-Langford	Manchester Basketball	

=== 2025–26 ===
Month	Player	Club	Source
September/October	(United States) RaeQuan Battle	Leicester Riders	
November	(United States) Rodney Chatman	Sheffield Sharks	
December	(United States) RaeQuan Battle	Leicester Riders	
January	(United States) Pat Robinson III	Cheshire Phoenix	
February	(United States) Pat Robinson III	Cheshire Phoenix	
March	(United States) Spencer Johnson	Leicester Riders	
April	(United Kingdom) Flynn Boardman-Raffet	Leicester Riders	

=== 2026-27 ===
Month	Player	Club	Source
September/October	(United States) Pat Robinson III	Liverpool Basketball	
