= Christian Vital =

American basketball player (born 1997)

No. 1 – Derthona Basket
- Position: Point guard
- League: LBA; EuroCup

Personal information
- Born: March 21, 1997 (age 29) Queens Village, New York, U.S.
- Listed height: 6 ft 2 in (1.88 m)
- Listed weight: 187 lb (85 kg)

Career information
- High school: The Rectory School (Pomfret, Connecticut); Vermont Academy (Saxtons River, Vermont); St. Thomas More (Oakdale, Connecticut)
- College: UConn (2016–2020)
- NBA draft: 2020: undrafted
- Playing career: 2021–present

Career history
- 2021–2022: Rio Grande Valley Vipers
- 2022: Hamilton Honey Badgers
- 2022: Raptors 905
- 2022–2023: Salt Lake City Stars
- 2023: Brampton Honey Badgers
- 2023–2024: Legia Warszawa
- 2024: Henan Golden Elephants
- 2024–2026: Derthona Basket
- 2026: Zhejiang Golden Bulls
- 2026–present: Derthona Basket

Career highlights
- FIBA Europe Cup Top Scorer (2024); All-PLK Team (2024); All-Lega Serie A Team (2026); Polish Cup winner (2024); NBA G League champion (2022); CEBL champion (2022); CEBL Finals MVP (2022); 2× All-CEBL Second Team (2022, 2023); CEBL steals leader (2022); First-team All-AAC (2020)
- Stats at Basketball Reference

Christian Lucien Vital (born March 21, 1997) is an American-born naturalized Armenian professional basketball player for Derthona Basket of the Italian Lega Basket Serie A (LBA) and the EuroCup. He played college basketball for the UConn Huskies. Vital also represents the senior Armenian national team in international competition.

== Early life and high school career ==
Vital is the oldest of five children born to Rose Vital-Williams. He grew up playing basketball for the PSA Cardinals Amateur Athletic Union program. He played chess from age five, competing in various tournaments in New York City, and continued playing the game in high school. Vital began high school at the Rectory School in Pomfret, Connecticut, living away from his family. He played basketball for St. Thomas More School in Oakdale, Connecticut for his final two years of high school. In his final season, Vital averaged 16.8 points, seven rebounds, and 2.2 assists per game, leading his team to a 31–7 record and the National Prep Championship final. He earned New England Preparatory School Athletic Council Class AAA first team honors and was selected to play in the Jordan Brand Classic Regional Game. Vital originally committed to play college basketball for UNLV but re-opened his recruitment after head coach Dave Rice left the program. On April 29, 2016, he committed to UConn over an offer from Louisville, among others.

== College career ==
Vital started 10 games as a freshman and averaged 9.1 points and 3.5 rebounds per game, though the Huskies finished with a 16–17 overall record, the program's first losing season in 30 years. On November 19, 2017, Vital scored a career-high 30 points in an 85–66 win over Boston University. As a sophomore, Vital averaged 14.9 points, a team-leading 5.4 rebounds and 1.6 steals per game. Following the season he declared for the 2018 NBA draft, but opted to return to UConn, citing "unfinished business." Vital averaged 14.9 points and 5.6 rebounds per game as a junior while leading the Huskies with 52 steals. As a senior, Vital averaged 16.4 points, 6.3 rebounds, 2.6 assists and 2.5 steals per game. He was named to the First Team All-American Athletic Conference. Vital scored 1,735 points in his UConn career, hitting an AAC-record 265 three-pointers.

== Professional career ==
=== Rio Grande Valley Vipers (2021–2022) ===
On August 19, 2020, Vital signed his first professional contract with BG Göttingen of the Basketball Bundesliga. However, his contract was terminated on September 21. After going undrafted in the 2020 NBA draft, he signed with the Memphis Grizzlies, but waived on December 16. He later joined the Memphis Hustle of the NBA G League in January 2021, but did not compete in any games.

On October 16, 2021, Vital signed with the Houston Rockets but was waived shortly thereafter. He subsequently joined the Rio Grande Valley Vipers where he played 45 games and averaged 12.8 points, 3.4 rebounds, 3.0 assists, and shot .401 from three-point range while helping the Vipers win the G League Championship.

=== Hamilton Honey Badgers (2022) ===
On May 12, 2022, Vital signed with the Hamilton Honey Badgers of the CEBL. On August 14, he won the franchise's first CEBL title with the Honey Badgers. Vital was named the CEBL Final MVP after scoring 17 points in the 90–88 win over Scarborough. Over the season, Vital averaged a team leading 17.4 points and 4.8 rebounds in 15 games.

=== Raptors 905 (2022) ===
Vital joined the Toronto Raptors for the 2022 NBA Summer League. He did not make the final roster but was added to their G League affiliate, Raptors 905.

=== Salt Lake City Stars (2022–2023) ===
On December 15, 2022, Vital was traded to the Salt Lake City Stars.

=== Brampton Honey Badgers (2023) ===
On April 1, 2023, Vital signed with Hapoel Haifa of the Israeli Basketball Premier League, but didn't play for them. On May 10, he signed with the Brampton Honey Badgers of the Canadian Elite Basketball League.

=== Legia Warszawa (2023–2024) ===
On July 20, 2023, Vital signed with Legia Warszawa of the Polish Basketball League.

=== Henan Golden Elephants (2024) ===
On June 6, 2024, Vital joined the Henan Golden Elephants of the National Basketball League.

=== Derthona Basket (2024–2026) ===
On June 22, 2024, he signed with Derthona Basket of the Italian Lega Basket Serie A (LBA).

=== Zhejiang Golden Bulls (2026) ===
On August 3, 2026, Vital signed with Zhejiang Golden Bulls of the Chinese Basketball Association.

=== Return to Derthona Basket (2026–present) ===
On November 6, 2026, Vital signed with Derthona Basket of the Italian Lega Basket Serie A (LBA).

== National team career ==
Vital represents the senior Armenian national basketball team.

== Career statistics ==
Legend
GP	Games played	GS	Games started	MPG	Minutes per game
FG%	Field goal percentage	3P%	3-point field goal percentage	FT%	Free throw percentage
RPG	Rebounds per game	APG	Assists per game	SPG	Steals per game
BPG	Blocks per game	PPG	Points per game	**Bold**	Career high

=== College ===
Year	Team	GP	GS	MPG	FG%	3P%	FT%	RPG	APG	SPG	BPG	PPG
2016–17	UConn	31	10	28.5	.391	.366	.708	3.5	1.8	1.1	**.2**	9.1
2017–18	UConn	32	23	31.7	.383	.318	.846	5.4	1.7	1.6	.0	14.9
2018–19	UConn	**33**	29	30.2	**.453**	**.409**	.813	5.6	2.4	1.6	.0	14.2
2019–20	UConn	31	**31**	**32.2**	.398	.346	**.899**	**6.3**	**2.6**	**2.5**	**.2**	**16.4**
Career		127	93	30.6	.407	.358	.836	5.2	2.1	1.7	.1	13.7
