= Ivica Radić =

Croatian basketball player

No. 41 – Miasto Szkła Krosno
- Position: Center / power forward
- League: PLK

Personal information
- Born: 8 September 1990 (age 36) Split, SR Croatia, SFR Yugoslavia
- Listed height: 2.08 m (6 ft 10 in)
- Listed weight: 111 kg (245 lb)

Career information
- Playing career: 2008–present

Career history
- 2008–2009: Split
- 2009–2010: Kaštela
- 2010–2011: Alkar
- 2011–2012: Zadar
- 2012–2014: Kvarner 2010
- 2014: Zagreb
- 2015: Veroli
- 2015: Reyer Venezia
- 2015: Fortitudo Bologna
- 2015–2016: Benfica
- 2016–2017: Viola Reggio Calabria
- 2017: Ferentino
- 2017–2018: Zalakerámia ZTE
- 2018–2019: Brussels
- 2019–2020: Zielona Góra
- 2020–2021: Włocławek
- 2021: Cantù
- 2021: Pallacanestro Forlì
- 2021: Vanoli Cremona
- 2021–2022: Levski Sofia
- 2022–2023: Trefl Sopot
- 2023–2024: Ourense
- 2024–2025: Benfica
- 2025–present: Miasto Szkła Krosno

Career highlights
- Polish Cup winner (2023)

Ivica Radić (born 8 September 1990) is a Croatian professional basketball player for Miasto Szkła Krosno of the Polish Basketball League (PLK).

== Professional career ==
He signed with Cremona on 17 September 2021. However, he parted ways with the team on 15 October 2021, after appearing in two games.

On November 15, 2022, he signed with Trefl Sopot of the Polish Basketball League.

On November 11, 2025, he signed with Miasto Szkła Krosno of the Polish Basketball League (PLK).
