= Rodney Chatman (disambiguation) =

Rodney Chatman may refer to:

- Rodney Chatman (born 1998), American basketball player
- Rodney Chatman, Brown University's vice president for public safety during the 2025 Brown University shooting
