= Michał Kolenda =

Polish basketball player

No. 23 – Legia Warsaw
- Position: Small forward
- League: PLK

Personal information
- Born: March 31, 1997 (age 29) Ełk, Poland
- Listed height: 6 ft 8 in (2.03 m)
- Listed weight: 194 lb (88 kg)

Career information
- NBA draft: 2018: undrafted
- Playing career: 2015–present

Career history
- 2015–2023: Trefl Sopot
- 2023–present: Legia Warsaw

Career highlights
- 2× PLK champion (2025, 2026); Polish Cup winner (2023, 2024)

Michał Kolenda (born March 31, 1997) is a Polish professional basketball player for Legia Warsaw of the Polish Basketball League (PLK). He represents the Polish national team internationally. Standing at 6 ft 8 in (2.03 m), he plays at the small forward position.

== Professional career ==
After spending 10 years in Trefl Sopot basketball system, Kolenda signed a two-year contract with Legia Warsaw in 2023. With team re-building before the 2023–24 season, Kolenmda was named the new captain of Legia team.

== International career ==
Kolenda represented Polish youth national teams and has made appearances for Poland men's national basketball team in qualifying tournaments since 2023.
