= Paul Scruggs =

American basketball player (born 1998)

No. 10 – Śląsk Wrocław
- Position: Point guard / shooting guard
- League: PLK

Personal information
- Born: March 9, 1998 (age 28) Indianapolis, Indiana, U.S.
- Listed height: 6 ft 5 in (1.96 m)
- Listed weight: 198 lb (90 kg)

Career information
- High school: Southport (Indianapolis, Indiana); Prolific Prep (Napa, California)
- College: Xavier (2017–2022)
- NBA draft: 2022: undrafted
- Playing career: 2022–present

Career history
- 2023–2024: Trefl Sopot
- 2024–2025: Hapoel Be'er Sheva
- 2025: Hapoel Gilboa Galil
- 2025–2026: Trefl Sopot
- 2026–present: Śląsk Wrocław

Career highlights
- Polish Cup MVP (2026); Polish Cup winner (2026); PLK champion (2024); NIT champion (2022); Second-team All-Big East (2021)

Paul Edward Scruggs (born March 9, 1998) is an American professional basketball player for Śląsk Wrocław of the Polish Basketball League (PLK). He played college basketball for the Xavier Musketeers.

== High school career ==
Scruggs played for Southport High School in Indianapolis, Indiana in his first three years of high school. As a junior, he averaged 19 points, 7.8 rebounds and 4.4 assists per game, leading his team to its first regional title since 1990. Scruggs finished 55 points shy of the school's all-time scoring record. He competed for the Indy Hoosiers on the Amateur Athletic Union circuit. For his senior season, Scruggs transferred to Prolific Prep in Napa, California, joining his longtime friend Gary Trent Jr. In his fifth game of the season, he suffered a torn MCL in his left knee that required surgery, before returning for his team's final two games.

=== Recruiting ===
On October 14, 2016, Scruggs committed to playing college basketball for Xavier over offers from Indiana, Michigan State and UConn. He became the program's highest ranked recruit in the modern recruiting era. Scruggs explained his decision by saying, "It's the school that fits my style of play."

College recruiting
Name	Hometown	School	Height	Weight	Commit date
Paul Scruggs; PG	Indianapolis, IN	Prolific Prep (CA)	6 ft 3 in (1.91 m)	190 lb (86 kg)	Oct 14, 2016
Paul Scruggs; PG	Recruit ratings: Scout: Rivals: 247Sports: ESPN: (89)				
Overall recruit ranking: Scout: 30 Rivals: 39 247Sports: 32 ESPN: 32
Note: In many cases, Scout, Rivals, 247Sports, On3, and ESPN may conflict in their listings of height and weight.; In these cases, the average was taken. ESPN grades are on a 100-point scale.; Sources: "Xavier 2017 Basketball Commitments". Rivals.; "2017 Xavier Musketeers Recruiting Class". ESPN.; "2017 Team Ranking". Rivals.

== College career ==
Scruggs came off the bench for Xavier in his freshman season, averaging 4.9 points per game. He moved into a starting role in the following season. Scruggs averaged 12.3 points, 4.9 rebounds and 3.3 assists per game as a sophomore. He declared for the 2019 NBA draft before withdrawing his name and returning to college. On November 24, 2019, Scruggs scored 24 points in a 70–65 loss to Florida in the Charleston Classic title game, earning All-Tournament Team honors. Scruggs posted a junior season-high 30 points in an 80–78 loss to Wake Forest on December 14. He missed his team's final three games of the season with a hamstring injury. As a junior, he averaged 12.7 points, 4.5 rebounds and 2.9 assists per game. For his senior season, Scruggs was named co-captain of his team.

== Professional career ==
On August 7, 2023, he signed with Trefl Sopot of the Polish Basketball League (PLK).

On September 27, 2026, he signed with Śląsk Wrocław of the Polish Basketball League (PLK).

== Career statistics ==
Legend
GP	Games played	GS	Games started	MPG	Minutes per game
FG%	Field goal percentage	3P%	3-point field goal percentage	FT%	Free throw percentage
RPG	Rebounds per game	APG	Assists per game	SPG	Steals per game
BPG	Blocks per game	PPG	Points per game	**Bold**	Career high

=== College ===
Year	Team	GP	GS	MPG	FG%	3P%	FT%	RPG	APG	SPG	BPG	PPG
2017–18	Xavier	34	0	16.8	.455	.304	.723	2.0	1.7	.5	.3	4.9
2018–19	Xavier	**35**	**35**	32.8	.461	**.375**	.737	**4.9**	3.3	1.2	**.5**	12.3
2019–20	Xavier	28	28	**33.3**	**.463**	.373	.741	4.5	2.9	1.2	.4	12.7
2020–21	Xavier	21	21	32.7	.458	.325	**.841**	4.0	**5.7**	**1.6**	**.5**	**14.0**
Career		118	84	28.3	.460	.355	.762	3.8	3.2	1.1	.4	10.6

== Personal life ==
Scruggs is the son of Brenda and Dan Scruggs. His favorite NBA player is LeBron James.
