= Alterique Gilbert =

American basketball player (born 1997)

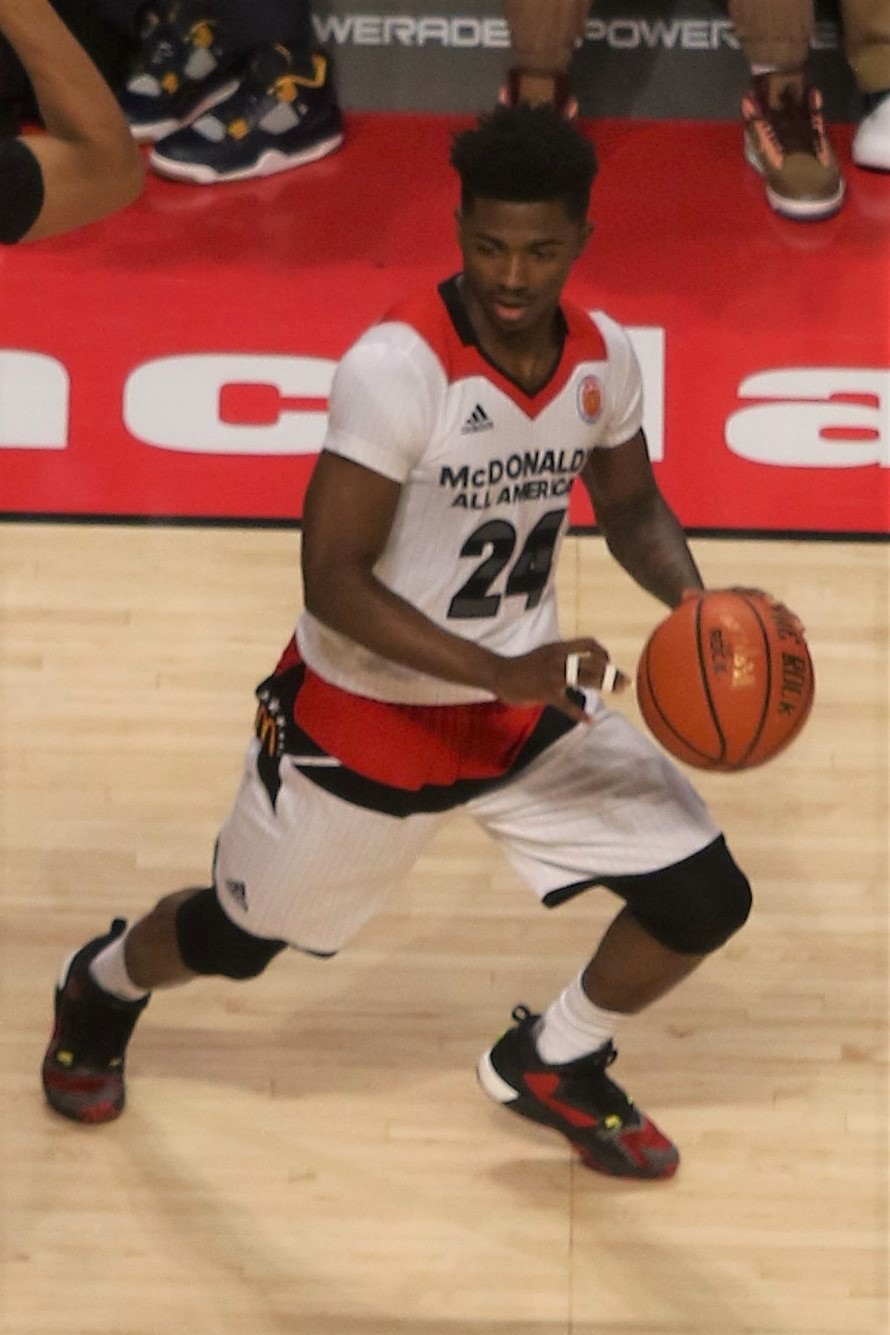
- Gilbert at the 2016 McDonald's All-American Game

Free Agent
- Position: Point guard

Personal information
- Born: October 6, 1997 (age 29)
- Listed height: 6 ft 0 in (1.83 m)
- Listed weight: 180 lb (82 kg)

Career information
- High school: Miller Grove (Lithonia, Georgia)
- College: UConn (2016–2020); Wichita State (2020–2021)
- NBA draft: 2021: undrafted
- Playing career: 2022–present

Career history
- 2022: KK Paulus Pärnu
- 2022–2023: BC Kalev
- 2023: Rapid București
- 2024: Helsinki Seagulls
- 2024–2025: Górnik Wałbrzych

Career highlights
- Polish Cup winner (2025); 2× Estonian League champion (2022, 2023); Third-team All-AAC (2021); McDonald's All-American (2016); Mr. Georgia Basketball (2016)

Alterique Lamont Gilbert (born October 6, 1997) is an American professional basketball player who last played for Górnik Wałbrzych of the Polish Basketball League (PLK). He played college basketball for the UConn Huskies and the Wichita State Shockers.

== Early life ==
Gilbert is originally from Richmond, Virginia but moved to Lithonia, Georgia as he entered his teenage years. He was raised by his mother, Tamonica Alexander, and was not acquainted with his father, Alcuero Gilbert, who was incarcerated for about 10 years. Gilbert grew up playing football and started focusing on basketball in seventh grade.

== High school career ==
Gilbert played basketball for Miller Grove High School near Lithonia. As a sophomore, he averaged 18.0 points, 3.7 rebounds, 5.6 assists and 4.1 steals, leading his team to a 28–5 record. As a junior, he averaged 18.5 points, 4.7 rebounds, 6.2 assists and 5.3 steals, leading his team to a 27–4 record. As a senior, he averaged 20.1 points, 5.8 assists, 5.5 rebounds and 4.3 steals, leading his team to a 31–3 record and the Class 5A state championship, his third state title in four years at Miller Grove. He helped his team reach the semifinals at High School Nationals despite sleeping one hour before the previous game. Gilbert was named Georgia Gatorade Player of the Year and Mr. Georgia Basketball. He was selected to play in the McDonald's All-American Game and Jordan Brand Classic. He left the Jordan Brand Classic early on April 15, 2016 after dislocating his left shoulder. In May, he underwent surgery on his shoulder. A four-star recruit and one of the best point guards in the 2016 class by the end of high school, Gilbert committed to UConn on July 4, 2015 over Louisville, Illinois, Syracuse and Texas.

== College career ==
On November 11, 2016, Gilbert made his collegiate debut, scoring 14 points in a 67–58 loss to Wagner. Two games later, on November 17 versus Loyola Marymount, he suffered a torn labrum in his left shoulder that would require season-ending surgery. Gilbert subsequently redshirted the season. On November 23, 2017, as a redshirt freshman, he scored a then-career-high 16 points in a 71–63 win over Oregon at the Phil Knight Invitational. In his next game versus Michigan State, Gilbert injured his left shoulder. He attempted to play through the pain in his following game against Arkansas before being sidelined. On December 28, it was announced that he would miss the remainder of the season and likely undergo surgery.

On December 5, 2018, during his sophomore season, Gilbert recorded a career-high 11 assists with no turnovers, five rebounds and three steals in a 90–63 victory over Lafayette. Three days later, he recorded a career-high 24 points, five steals and four three-pointers in a 79–71 loss to 11th-ranked Florida State at the Never Forget Tribute Classic. On January 26, Gilbert aggravated his left shoulder against Wichita State and missed five games. On March 7, in a 78–71 loss to Temple, he collapsed and began bleeding profusely from his nose after being hit in the face. He missed the final three games of the season with a concussion and right eye injury. He started in 23 of 25 games and averaged 12.6 points, 3.6 assists, 2.9 rebounds and 1.3 steals per game.

On November 13, 2019, Gilbert scored a junior season-high 22 points in a 96–87 loss to Saint Joseph's. As a junior, he played 30 games for UConn, starting in 20, and averaged 8.5 points, 3.8 assists, 2.6 rebounds and 1.1 steals per game. Gilbert suffered from mental health issues, attending weekly therapy and taking daily medication to stabilize his mood. After the season, he announced that he was transferring from UConn.

On March 28, 2020, Gilbert committed to play for Wichita State in his senior season. He is immediately eligible as a graduate transfer, filling a void at point guard and teaming up with Dexter Dennis in the backcourt. Gilbert averaged 10.3 points, 3.1 rebounds, 4.1 assists, and 1.6 steals per game. He was named to the Third Team All-American Athletic Conference.

== Professional career ==
In January 2022, Gilbert signed with KK Paulus Pärnu of the Latvian-Estonian Basketball League for the rest of the 2021–22 season.

For the 2022–23 season, Gilbert joined BC Kalev/Cramo of the Latvian-Estonian Basketball League.

Gilbert started the 2023–24 season with Rapid Bucharest of the Romanian Basketball League but left in December 2023. In March 2024, he joined the Helsinki Seagulls of the Korisliiga.

In July 2024, Gilbert signed with Górnik Wałbrzych of the Polish Basketball League.

== Career statistics ==
Legend
| GP | Games played | GS | Games started | MPG | Minutes per game |
| FG% | Field goal percentage | 3P% | 3-point field goal percentage | FT% | Free throw percentage |
| RPG | Rebounds per game | APG | Assists per game | SPG | Steals per game |
| BPG | Blocks per game | PPG | Points per game | **Bold** | Career high |

=== College ===
| Year | Team | GP | GS | MPG | FG% | 3P% | FT% | RPG | APG | SPG | BPG | PPG |
|---|---|---|---|---|---|---|---|---|---|---|---|---|
| 2016–17 | UConn | 3 | 2 | 29.0 | **.500** | .222 | .700 | 3.3 | 2.0 | **2.3** | .0 | 10.3 |
| 2017–18 | UConn | 6 | 6 | 27.8 | .317 | .227 | .550 | **4.0** | 2.8 | 1.2 | **.3** | 9.0 |
| 2018–19 | UConn | 25 | **23** | **29.4** | .381 | **.336** | **.775** | 2.9 | 3.6 | 1.3 | .1 | **12.6** |
| 2019–20 | UConn | **30** | 20 | 27.2 | .346 | .318 | .671 | 2.6 | 3.8 | 1.1 | .1 | 8.5 |
| 2020–21 | Wichita State | 22 | 20 | 29.6 | .348 | .289 | .714 | 3.1 | **4.1** | 1.6 | .1 | 10.3 |
| Career | | 86 | 71 | 28.6 | .360 | .308 | .706 | 2.9 | 3.7 | 1.3 | .1 | 10.3 |

=== Professional career ===
| Year | Team | GP | GS | MPG | FG% | 3P% | FT% | RPG | APG | SPG | BPG | PPG |
|---|---|---|---|---|---|---|---|---|---|---|---|---|
| 2021–22 | KK Paulus Pärnu | 13 | 13 | 28.80 | **.500** | .285 | .787 | 3.23 | 5.08 | **3.15** | 0.8 | 14.92 |
