= Mindaugas Kačinas =

Lithuanian basketball player (born 1993)

- Kačinas with the Lithuania national team in 2026

No. 13 – Split
- Position: Power forward / small forward
- League: Premijer liga

Personal information
- Born: June 30, 1993 (age 33) Klaipėda, Lithuania
- Listed height: 6 ft 8 in (2.03 m)
- Listed weight: 220 lb (100 kg)

Career information
- High school: Word of Life Fire Traditional School (Wichita, Kansas)
- College: South Carolina (2012–2016)
- NBA draft: 2016: undrafted
- Playing career: 2016–present

Career history
- 2016–2018: Neptūnas Klaipėda
- 2018: Stelmet Zielona Góra
- 2018–2019: Keflavík
- 2019–2020: Palencia Baloncesto
- 2020–2022: Río Breogán
- 2022–2024: San Pablo Burgos
- 2024: Edmonton Stingers
- 2024–2025: HLA Alicante
- 2025–2026: Trefl Sopot
- 2026–present: Split

Career highlights
- Polish Cup winner (2026); Spanish Copa Princesa de Asturias MVP (2021)
Medals
Men's basketball
Representing Lithuania
Summer Universiade
| Gold medal – first place | 2017 Taipei | Team competition |

Mindaugas Kačinas (born June 30, 1993) is a Lithuanian professional basketball player for Split of the Premijer liga. He plays the power forward position, and has represented Lithuania in international competition.

== Early career ==
Kačinas played for Word of Life Fire Traditional School in Wichita, Kansas under head coach Ryan Hujing, averaging 23.6 points and 12.1 rebounds in his senior season.

== College career ==
Kačinas played college basketball for South Carolina from 2012 to 2016, averaging 6.7 points in 132 games.

== Professional career ==
After graduating from the South Carolina Gamecocks, Kačinas signed a two-year deal with Neptūnas Klaipėda.

In December 2018, Kačinas signed with Keflavík of the Icelandic Úrvalsdeild karla. In his debut, he had 20 points and 8 rebounds in a narrow loss against Njarðvík.

In July 2019 Kačinas signed a one-year deal with Palencia Baloncesto of the second Spanish league. He averaged 8.7 points and 6.1 rebounds per game on 54.9 percent shooting in 2019–20.

On September 23, 2022, he signed with San Pablo Burgos of the LEB Oro.

On November 28, 2024, Kačinas signed with HLA Alicante of the Primera FEB.

On August 27, 2025, he signed with Trefl Sopot of the Polish Basketball League (PLK).

On September 6, 2026, he signed with Split of the Premijer liga and the ABA League.

== International career ==
Kačinas played in 2013 FIBA Europe Under-20 Championship for Lithuania men's national under-20 and was one of the team's leaders, averaging 9 points, 5.5 rebounds and 1.3 assists per game.

== Personal life ==
Mindaugas is the son of Ricardas Kačinas and Rita Kačinienė. He has a brother, Arvydas, and a sister, Reda. He supports the Miami Heat and is a fan of Kevin Durant. At South Carolina, he majored in hotel management.
