= 2026 Polish Basketball Cup =

Polish Basketball Cup
- Season: 2025–26
- Duration: 19–22 February
- Games played: 7
- Teams: 8

Finals
- Champions: Trefl Sopot (4th title)
- Runners-up: Zastal Zielona Góra

The 2026 Bank Pekao Polish Basketball Cup (Polish: Puchar Polski 2026) is the 63rd edition of Poland's national cup competition for men basketball teams. It is managed by the Polish Basketball League (PLK) and will be held in Sosnowiec, in the Arena Sosnowiec.

== Qualified teams ==
The eight participants qualified for the tournament after the first half of the 2025–26 PLK season. The highest-placed four teams and would play against the four low-seeded teams in the quarter-finals.

Pos	Team	Pld	W	L	PF	PA	PD	Pts	Seeding
1	WKS Śląsk Wrocław	15	11	4	1339	1226	+113	26	Seeded
2	Arka Gdynia	15	11	4	1280	1203	+77	26	Seeded
3	Trefl Sopot	15	10	5	1342	1209	+133	25	Seeded
4	King Szczecin	15	10	5	1248	1222	+26	25	Seeded
5	Górnik Wałbrzych	15	9	6	1207	1202	+5	24	Unseeded
6	Dziki Warszawa	15	9	6	1374	1295	+79	24	Unseeded
7	Legia Warszawa	15	9	6	1254	1198	+56	24	Unseeded
8	Zastal Zielona Góra	15	8	7	1276	1226	+50	23	Unseeded

Source: PLK

== Draw ==
The draw held on 13 January 2026 in Polsat Sport 1 studio.

== Bracket ==
Quarterfinals; 19–20 February
Trefl Sopot	83
Legia Warszawa	80
Arka Gdynia	81
Górnik Wałbrzych	91
WKS Śląsk Wrocław	91
Dziki Warszawa	86
King Szczecin	88
Zastal Zielona Góra	94

Semifinals; 21 February
Trefl Sopot	92
Górnik Wałbrzych	67
WKS Śląsk Wrocław	79
Zastal Zielona Góra	86

Final; 22 February
Trefl Sopot	91
Zastal Zielona Góra	67

== Quarterfinals ==
19 February 2026 QF	Trefl Sopot	83–80	Legia Warszawa	Sosnowiec
18:00 CET (UTC+01:00)	Scoring by quarter: 23–23, 22–21, 18–19, 20–17
	Pts: Suurorg, Witliński 16; Rebs: Scruggs 8 Asts: Schenk 7 PIR: Witliński 19	Boxscore	Pts: Pluta, Thompson 17; Rebs: Thompson 9 Asts: Ponsar 4 PIR: Thompson 26	Arena: Arena Sosnowiec; Attendance: 1,261; Referees: Marcin Kowalski, Michał Chrakowiecki, Mateusz Skorek

19 February 2026 QF	Arka Gdynia	81–91	Górnik Wałbrzych	Sosnowiec
20:30 CET (UTC+01:00)	Scoring by quarter: 23–16, 18–31, 17–25, 23–19
	Pts: Zyskowski 22; Rebs: Kowalczyk, Ljubičić 7 Asts: three players 3 PIR: Barrett 16	Boxscore	Pts: Anderson III 31; Rebs: Anderson III 8 Asts: Anderson III 9 PIR: Anderson III 35	Arena: Arena Sosnowiec; Attendance: 1,706; Referees: Tomasz Trawicki, Łukasz Jankowski, Adam Krzemień

20 February 2026 QF	WKS Śląsk Wrocław	91–86	Dziki Warszawa	Sosnowiec
18:00 CET (UTC+01:00)	Scoring by quarter: 25–24, 25–13, 21–24, 20–25
	Pts: Đorđević 21; Rebs: Urbaniak 8 Asts: Kirkwood 9 PIR: Đorđević 23	Boxscore	Pts: Edge 22; Rebs: Frąckiewicz 9 Asts: Edge 4 PIR: Edge 21	Arena: Arena Sosnowiec; Attendance: 1,456; Referees: Piotr Pastusiak, Wojciech Liszka, Michał Kuzia

20 February 2026 QF	King Szczecin	88–94	Zastal Zielona Góra	Sosnowiec
20:30 CET (UTC+01:00)	Scoring by quarter: 17–19, 23–22, 28–25, 20–28
	Pts: Freidel 17; Rebs: Gielo, Roberts 8 Asts: Novak 7 PIR: Popović 18	Boxscore	Pts: Lewis 25; Rebs: Cartier 6 Asts: Mazurczak 7 PIR: three players 21	Arena: Arena Sosnowiec; Attendance: 1,610; Referees: Michał Proc, Marek Maliszewski, Paweł Pacek

== Semifinals ==
21 February 2026 SF	Trefl Sopot	92–67	Górnik Wałbrzych	Sosnowiec
15:00	Scoring by quarter: 25–15, 8–8, 22–25, 34–19
	Pts: Kačinas 18; Rebs: Kačinas 11; Asts: Suurorg 8 PIR: Kačinas 24	Boxscore	Pts: Anderson III 33; Rebs: Wyka 9 Asts: Anderson III 6 PIR: Anderson III 30	Arena: Arena Sosnowiec; Attendance: 2,340; Referees: Marcin Kowalski, Tomasz Trawicki, Tomasz Langowski

21 February 2026 SF	WKS Śląsk Wrocław	79–86	Zastal Zielona Góra	Sosnowiec
19:00	Scoring by quarter: 17–23, 15–18, 23–17, 24–28
	Pts: Kirkwood 27; Rebs: Kirkwood, Núñez 6 Asts: Sanon 7 PIR: Kirkwood 24	Boxscore	Pts: Lewis 22; Rebs: Cartier 9 Asts: Cartier 5 PIR: Fayne, Lewis 19	Arena: Arena Sosnowiec; Attendance: 2,651; Referees: Michał Proc, Łukasz Jankowski, Michał Chrakowiecki

== Final ==
22 February 2026 F	Trefl Sopot	91–67	Zastal Zielona Góra	Sosnowiec
17:30	Scoring by quarter: 21–16, 25–21, 16–12, 29–18
	Pts: Kačinas 19; Rebs: Kačinas 7 Asts: Suurorg 7 PIR: Kačinas 23	Boxscore	Pts: Maughmer; Rebs: Cartier 8 Asts: Garrison 5 PIR: Cartier 17	Arena: Arena Sosnowiec; Attendance: 2,229; Referees: Piotr Pastusiak , Marek Maliszewski , Robert Mordal

Starters:			Pts	Reb	Ast
PG	11	(Estonia) Kasper Suurorg	12	5	7
SG	0	(United States) Paul Scruggs	16	4	4
SF	13	(Lithuania) Mindaugas Kačinas	19	7	2
PF	33	(United States) Kenny Goins	13	6	3
C	12	(Poland) Mikołaj Witliński	11	6	1
Reserves:					
SF	3	(Poland) Szymon Kiejzik	3	0	0
SF	7	(Poland) Szymon Nowicki	0	0	0
C	21	(Poland) Szymon Zapała	14	6	1
C	25	(Poland) Maksymilian Jęch	DNP		
G	37	(United States) Dylan Addae-Wusu	3	1	5
SG	91	(Poland) Franciszek Chac	DNP		
Head coach:
(Finland) Mikko Larkas

Trefl Sopot	Zielona Góra

Trefl Sopot	Statistics	Zielona Góra
20/36 (55.5%)	2 point field goals	20/36 (55.5%)
11/21 (52.4%)	3 point field goals	7/29 (24.1%)
18/22 (81.8%)	Free throws	6/10 (60%)
10	Offensive rebounds	13
26	Defensive rebounds	17
36	Total rebounds	30
23	Assists	19
6	Steals	8
13	Turnovers	13
0	Blocks	0

Starters:			Pts	Reb	Ast
PG	3	(Poland) Andrzej Mazurczak	10	4	4
SG	0	(United States) Conley Garrison	3	2	5
SF	32	(United States) Jayvon Maughmer	16	1	0
PF	7	(Poland) Krzysztof Sulima	4	2	1
C	12	(United States) Patrick Cartier	10	8	4
Reserves:					
G/F	1	(Poland) Miłosz Góreńczyk	2	0	0
F	6	(Poland) Miłosz Majewski	0	0	0
C	10	(United States) Phil Fayne	9	5	1
G/F	40	(United States) Chavaughn Lewis	13	5	2
PG	77	(Poland) Marcin Woroniecki	0	1	2
Head coach:
(Poland) Arkadiusz Miłoszewski

2026 Polish Cup Winners
Trefl Sopot
(4th title)

== See also ==
- 2025–26 PLK season
