= 2025 Polish Basketball Cup =

61st edition of Poland's national cup competition for men basketball teams

Polish Basketball Cup
- Season: 2024–25
- Duration: 13–16 February
- Games played: 7
- Teams: 8

Finals
- Champions: Górnik Zamek Książ Wałbrzych (1st title)
- Runners-up: King Szczecin

Awards
- Final MVP: (United States) Toddrick Gotcher

The 2025 Bank Pekao Polish Basketball Cup (Polish: Puchar Polski 2025) is the 62nd edition of Poland's national cup competition for men basketball teams. It is managed by the Polish Basketball League (PLK) and will be held in Sosnowiec, in the Arena Sosnowiec.

== Qualified teams ==
The eight participants qualified for the tournament after the first half of the 2024–25 PLK season. The highest-placed four teams and would play against the four low-seeded teams in the quarter-finals.

Pos	Team	Pld	W	L	PF	PA	PD	Pts	Seeding
1	Anwil Włocławek	15	13	2	1359	1193	+166	28	Seeded
2	Trefl Sopot	15	11	4	1331	1280	+51	26	Seeded
3	Górnik Zamek Książ Wałbrzych	15	10	5	1162	1121	+41	25	Seeded
4	PGE Start Lublin	15	9	6	1346	1316	+30	24	Seeded
5	Legia Warszawa	15	8	7	1235	1216	+19	23	Unseeded
6	King Szczecin	15	8	7	1262	1233	+29	23	Unseeded
7	Dziki Warszawa	15	8	7	1118	1089	+29	23	Unseeded
8	Śląsk Wrocław	15	7	8	1161	1190	−29	22	Unseeded

Source: PLK

== Draw ==
The draw was held on 21 January 2025 in Polsat Sport 1 studio.

== Bracket ==
Quarterfinals; 13–14 February
Polski Cukier Start Lublin	93
Dziki Warszawa	82
Górnik Zamek Książ Wałbrzych	73
Legia Warszawa	72
Trefl Sopot	77
King Szczecin	97
Anwil Włocławek	99
Śląsk Wrocław	93

Semifinals; 15 February
Polski Cukier Start Lublin	60
Górnik Zamek Książ Wałbrzych	88
King Szczecin	77
Anwil Włocławek	73

Final; 16 February
Górnik Zamek Książ Wałbrzych	80
King Szczecin	78

== Quarterfinals ==
13 February 2025 QF	Polski Cukier Start Lublin	93–82	Dziki Warszawa	Sosnowiec
18:00 CET (UTC+01:00)	Scoring by quarter: 29–14, 19–21, 17–24, 28–23
Polsat Sport 3	Pts: Brown 34; Rebs: Williams 7 Asts: Lecomte, Pelczar 4 PIR: Brown 29	Boxscore	Pts: Jõesaar 18; Rebs: Jõesaar 10; Asts: Radičević 8 PIR: Jõesaar 27	Arena: Arena Sosnowiec; Attendance: 800; Referees: Marcin Kowalski, Michał Kuzia, Tomasz Langowski

13 February 2025 QF	Górnik Zamek Książ Wałbrzych	73–72	Legia Warszawa	Sosnowiec
20:30 CET (UTC+01:00)	Scoring by quarter: 15–11, 13–26, 26–21, 19–14
Polsat Sport 1	Pts: Gilbert 20; Rebs: Patton, Wyka 9 Asts: Gilbert 5 PIR: Patton 17	Boxscore	Pts: McGusty 16; Rebs: Vucić 15; Asts: Pluta 8 PIR: McGusty, Vucić	Arena: Arena Sosnowiec; Attendance: 1,192; Referees: Łukasz Jankowski, Robert Mordal, Bogna Podkowińska

14 February 2025 QF	Trefl Sopot	77–97	King Szczecin	Sosnowiec
18:00 CET (UTC+01:00)	Scoring by quarter: 13–23, 17–29, 23–24, 24–21
Polsat Sport 2	Pts: Groselle, Schenk 14; Rebs: Weathers 6 Asts: Schenk 7 PIR: Kennedy 17	Boxscore	Pts: Whitehead 21; Rebs: Nicholson, Novak 5 Asts: Novak 14; PIR: Woodard 23	Arena: Arena Sosnowiec; Attendance: 1,056; Referees: Marcin Kowalski, Michał Proc, Paweł Pacek

14 February 2025 QF	Anwil Włocławek	99–93(OT)	Śląsk Wrocław	Sosnowiec
20:30 CET (UTC+01:00)	Scoring by quarter: 20–23, 21–22, 15–21, 27–17, Overtime: 16–10
Polsat Sport 2	Pts: Turner 25; Rebs: Petrasek 8 Asts: Łączyński 9 PIR: Petrasek, Turner 20	Boxscore	Pts: Senglin 19; Rebs: Gołębiowski, Penava 8 Asts: Robinson 10; PIR: Penava 21	Arena: Arena Sosnowiec; Attendance: 1,395; Referees: Łukasz Jankowski, Michał Chrakowiecki, Mateusz Skorek

== Semifinals ==
15 February 2025 SF	Polski Cukier Start Lublin	60–88	Górnik Zamek Książ Wałbrzych	Sosnowiec
15:00 CET (UTC+01:00)	Scoring by quarter: 12–17, 16–25, 12–22, 20–24
Polsat Sport 2	Pts: Lecomte 12; Rebs: Drame 6 Asts: Pelczar 3 PIR: Lecomte 14	Boxscore	Pts: Smith 24; Rebs: Smith 9 Asts: Gilbert 5 PIR: Smith 32	Arena: Arena Sosnowiec; Attendance: 2,008; Referees: Wojciech Liszka, Michał Chrakowiecki, Bogna Podkowińska

15 February 2025 SF	King Szczecin	77–73	Anwil Włocławek	Sosnowiec
19:00 CET (UTC+01:00)	Scoring by quarter: 17–21, 27–15, 21–15, 12–22
Polsat Sport 2	Pts: Whitehead 23; Rebs: Novak 7 Asts: Novak 4 PIR: Whitehead 18	Boxscore	Pts: Taylor 12; Rebs: Michalak, Petrasek 7 Asts: Łączyński 6 PIR: Łączyński 14	Arena: Arena Sosnowiec; Attendance: 2,439; Referees: Marcin Kowalski, Łukasz Jankowski, Tomasz Langowski

== Final ==
16 February 2025 F	Górnik Zamek Książ Wałbrzych	80–78	King Szczecin	Sosnowiec
17:30 CET (UTC+01:00)	Scoring by quarter: 19–13, 22–16, 16–27, 23–22
Polsat Sport 3	Pts: Smith 27; Rebs: Wyka 12; Asts: Smith 5 PIR: Smith 30	Boxscore	Pts: Novak 24; Rebs: Novak 9 Asts: Novak 6 PIR: Novak 31	Arena: Arena Sosnowiec; Attendance: 2,929; Referees: Wojciech Liszka, Michał Proc, Michał Kuzia

Starters:			Pts	Reb	Ast
PG	1	(United States) Alterique Gilbert	5	0	4
SG	0	(United States) Toddrick Gotcher	24	4	2
SF	24	(Poland) Kacper Marchewka	0	1	1
PF	41	(Poland) Grzegorz Kulka	10	6	4
C	91	(Poland) Dariusz Wyka	7	12	0
Reserves:					
C	2	(Poland) Piotr Niedźwiedzki	DNP		
PF	3	(United States) Ike Smith	27	5	5
SG	11	(Poland) Aleksander Wiśniewski	3	0	0
SG	30	(United States) Joshua Patton	2	2	0
SG	31	(Latvia) Jānis Bērziņš	2	0	0
SG	55	(Poland) Krzysztof Jakóbczyk	DNP		
Head coach:
(Polish Basketball Federation) Andrzej Adamek

Górnik Wałbrzych	King Szczecin

Górnik Wałbrzych	Statistics	King Szczecin
20/37 (54.1%)	2 point field goals	15/39 (38.5%)
9/25 (36.0%)	3 point field goals	13/29 (44.8%)
13/20 (65.0%)	Free throws	9/16 (56.3%)
5	Offensive rebounds	16
27	Defensive rebounds	30
32	Total rebounds	46
16	Assists	15
4	Steals	1
2	Turnovers	8
7	Blocks	2

Starters:			Pts	Reb	Ast
PG	30	(Serbia) Jovan Novak	24	9	6
SG	15	(United States) Isaiah Whitehead	6	3	5
SF	21	(United States) Tony Meier	5	4	1
PF	11	(Poland) Aleksander Dziewa	22	4	1
C	7	(United States) Kassim Nicholson	9	7	0
Reserves:					
G	8	(United States) James Woodard	5	7	2
SG	9	(Poland) Michał Kierlewicz	DNP		
PF	10	(Poland) Szymon Wójcik	2	2	0
PG	12	(Poland) Antoni Majcherek	DNP		
PF	31	(Poland) Mateusz Kostrzewski	5	6	0
Head coach:
(Polish Basketball Federation) Arkadiusz Miłoszewski

2025 Polish Cup Winners
Górnik Zamek Książ Wałbrzych
(1st title)

== See also ==
- 2024–25 PLK season
