= Ike Smith =

American basketball player (born 1997)

No. 3 – Górnik Wałbrzych
- Position: Guard - Forward
- League: PLK

Personal information
- Born: July 5, 1997 (age 29) Gainesville, Florida
- Listed height: 6 ft 4 in (1.93 m)
- Listed weight: 210 lb (95 kg)

Career information
- High school: Gainesville (Gainesville, Florida)
- College: Georgia Southern (2015–2020)
- NBA draft: 2019: undrafted
- Playing career: 2020–present

Career history
- 2020–2021: Gießen 46ers
- 2021–2023: Tampereen Pyrintö
- 2023–2024: Nuova Pallacanestro Vigevano 1955
- 2024–present: Górnik Wałbrzych

Career highlights
- Polish Cup winner (2025); First-team All-Sun Belt (2017); Third-team All-Sun Belt (2020)

Ikeon Deonta Smith (born July 5, 1997) is an American professional basketball player for Górnik Wałbrzych of the Orlen Basket Liga. He played college basketball for Georgia Southern.

== Early life ==
Smith grew up in Gainesville, Florida and mainly played football growing up. He began to focus more on basketball after getting injured playing basketball in sixth grade. Smith attended Gainesville High School and competed for Florida Elite in Amateur Athletic Union (AAU) play. He continued playing quarterback on the football team in addition to playing basketball. As a senior, Smith averaged 18.4 points, 7.8 rebounds, and 2.5 assists per game. He leading Gainesville to the FHSAA 6-A State Championship Game, where they lost to Miami Norland Senior High School despite 21 points and 10 rebounds from Smith. He was named to the First-Team All-State and was County Player of the Year. In April 2015, Smith committed to Georgia Southern over offers from South Alabama, Jacksonville, Tennessee Tech, Western Carolina, Coastal Carolina, Ohio, and Arkansas State. He chose the Eagles because his cousin, Willie Powells, attended the university and he told Smith stories about how much he enjoyed it.

== College career ==
Smith averaged 11.7 points, 4.8 rebounds, and 1.1 assists per game as a freshman at Georgia Southern. On December 1, 2016, Smith scored a career-high 29 points and had five rebounds in a 94-75 win against Savannah State. As a sophomore, Smith led the Sun Belt in scoring with 19.6 points per game, and led Georgia Southern in rebounding with 5.2 rebounds per game. He joined teammate Tookie Brown on the First Team All-Sun Belt. Smith struggled with an ankle sprain as a junior. He averaged 12.0 points and 4.3 rebounds per game.

Smith played the first 10 games of his senior season, averaging 14.7 points and 5.7 rebounds per game. He sustained a back injury, forcing him to miss the rest of the season, and he sought a medical hardship waiver for another season of eligibility. The waiver was granted in June 2019. As a redshirt senior, Smith averaged 14.1 points and 5.5 rebounds per game, scoring double figures in 24 games. He was named to the Third Team All-Sun Belt and Second Team All-District by the National Association of Basketball Coaches. Smith received the 2020 All-American Athlete Award from the National Strength and Conditioning Association. He finished his career second on the Georgia Southern Division I scoring list with 1,931 points and 10th at Georgia Southern in rebounds (668).

== Professional career ==
On September 17, 2020, Smith signed his first professional contract with the Gießen 46ers in Germany. On October 23, 2021, Smith signed with the Texas Legends after a successful tryout.

On July 30, 2024, he signed with Górnik Wałbrzych of the Polish Basketball League (PLK).
