= Toddrick Gotcher =

American basketball player

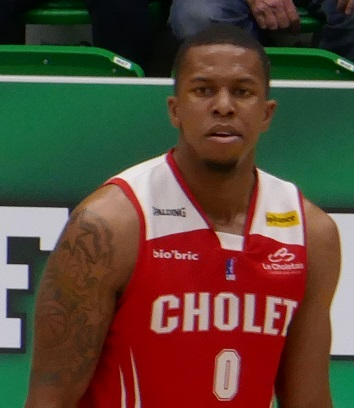
- Gotcher in action with Cholet

Free Agent
- Position: Shooting guard

Personal information
- Born: March 14, 1993 (age 33) Dallas, Texas
- Listed height: 6 ft 4 in (1.93 m)
- Listed weight: 200 lb (91 kg)

Career information
- High school: Lakeview Centennial (Garland, Texas)
- College: Texas Tech (2011–2016)
- NBA draft: 2016: undrafted
- Playing career: 2016–present

Career history
- 2016–2017: Koroivos Amaliadas
- 2017–2018: Cholet
- 2018–2019: Ifaistos Limnou
- 2019–2020: Beşiktaş
- 2020: MZT Skopje
- 2020–2021: Charilaos Trikoupis
- 2021–2023: CSO Voluntari
- 2023–2024: Oradea
- 2024–2025: Górnik Wałbrzych

Career highlights
- Polish Cup MVP (2025); Polish Cup winner (2025); Romanian Cup winner (2022)

Toddrick Gotcher (born March 14, 1993) is an American professional basketball player who last played for Górnik Wałbrzych of the Orlen Basket Liga. He played college basketball for Texas Tech Red Raiders from 2011 until 2016. Gotcher entered the 2016 NBA draft, but was not selected in the draft's two rounds.

== High school career ==
Gotcher played high school basketball at Lakeview Centennial in Garland, Texas. He was ranked as the No. 2 player in Texas. Gotcher went to the Texas State Finals two years in a row during his Junior and Senior year in high school. He averaged 16.4 points, 7.4 rebounds, 2.4 assists, and 1.5 steals per game.

== College career ==
Gotcher played college basketball at Texas Tech University from 2011 to 2016 with Texas Tech Red Raiders. In his senior year, he averaged 10.9 points, 3.5 rebounds and 2.2 assists per game. He led his team to NCAA Tournament his senior year. He was named Big XII Honorable Mention his senior year.

== Professional career ==
After going undrafted in the 2016 NBA draft, Gotcher signed with Koroivos Amaliadas of the Greek Basket League. On December 12, 2016, he was voted as the Stoiximan.gr MVP of the week after having 29 points, 10 rebounds and 1 assist against Aries Trikala. He was also voted as the Stoiximan.gr MVP of the week after having 26 points, 6 rebounds and 2 assist against Apollon Patras. At the end of the full season, Gotcher went on to average 12.9 points, 5.8 rebounds, 2.2 assists, and 1.6 steals in 26 games for Koroivos. During the season, Gotcher scored in double figures 17 times, having also 4 double-double in points and rebounds. Gotcher total stats were 1st in Three-Pointers made, 3rd in Total Points, 4th in Steals, and 5th in Total Rebounds.

On July 17, 2017, Gotcher joined Cholet of the French LNB Pro A.

On August 19, 2019, he has signed with Beşiktaş Sompo Japan.

On August 20, 2020, Gotcher joined MZT Skopje. In December of the same year, he left MZT and returned to Greece, joining Charilaos Trikoupis of the Greek Basket League. Gotcher averaged 18.8 points, 4.9 rebounds and 2.9 assists per game.

On August 2, 2021, he signed a two-year deal with CSO Voluntari of the Liga Națională. On February 19, 2022, Voluntari won the Romanian Cup after a final in which Gotcher scored 18 points, 6 rebounds and 5 assists.

On July 23, 2024, he signed with Górnik Wałbrzych of the Polish Basketball League (PLK).
