= KKK MOSiR Krosno =

Polish basketball club

- Leagues: I Liga
- Founded: 2000; 26 years ago
- History: KKK MOSiR Krosno (2000–present)
- Arena: VANDER Arena
- Capacity: 1,380
- President: Janusz Walciszewski
- Head coach: Maroš Kováčik
- Team captain: Michał Jankowski
- 2025–26 position: PLK, 16th of 16 (relegated)
- Championships: 2 I Liga; 1 PZKosz Cup
- Website: Link
Home	Away

KKK MOSiR Krosno, for sponsorship reasons named Miasto Szkła Krosno, is a Polish basketball club based in Krosno. As of 2026, the club competes in the I Liga, the second highest basketball division in Poland.

== History ==
In the 2015–16 season, Krosno won the I Liga and was promoted to the PLK. In its first PLK season, the team ended in 12th place for the regular season.

In the 2018–19 season, Krosno finished in the 16th and last place and was relegated back to the I Liga.

== Sponsorship names ==
Due to sponsorship reasons, the club has been known as:

- PBS Bank MOSiR (until 2011)
- Delikatsey Centrum PBS Bank MOSiR (2011–2012)
- PBS Bank EFIR Energy MOSiR (2012–2013)
- MOSiR Krosno (2013–2014)
- Miasto Szkła Krosno (2014–present)

== Players ==
=== Current roster ===
Note: Flags indicate national team eligibility at FIBA-sanctioned events. Players may hold other non-FIBA nationalities not displayed.

Miasto Szkła Krosno roster
Players
Coaches

Pos.	No.	Nat.	Name	Ht.	Wt.	Age
SF	0	(Poland)	Góreńczyk, Jan	1.92 m (6 ft 4 in)		21 – 30 November 2004
G	2	(United States)	Shungu, Ben	1.88 m (6 ft 2 in)		28 – 4 October 1997
G	3	(United States)	Jackson III, Charles	1.85 m (6 ft 1 in)		25 – 3 May 2001
F	7	(United States)	Hensley, Jarrett	2.03 m (6 ft 8 in)		25 – 28 September 2000
SG	12	(Poland)	Jankowski, Michał (C)	1.93 m (6 ft 4 in)		38 – 15 September 1987
PG	13	(Poland)	Chruściel, Cezary	1.80 m (5 ft 11 in)		18 – 23 July 2007
G	14	(United States)	Hopkins, Javontae	1.83 m (6 ft 0 in)		25 – 6 July 2001
SF	15	(United States)	Hamilton, Jairus	2.03 m (6 ft 8 in)		26 – 11 January 2000
C	17	(Poland)	Wrona, Przemysław	2.05 m (6 ft 9 in)		33 – 7 May 1993
PG	24	(Poland)	Łalak, Hubert	1.80 m (5 ft 11 in)		23 – 15 July 2003
SG	39	(Latvia)	Laksa, Mārtiņš	1.98 m (6 ft 6 in)		36 – 20 June 1990
F/C	41	(Croatia)	Radić, Ivica	2.08 m (6 ft 10 in)		35 – 8 September 1990
G/F	77	(Poland)	Chrabota, Michał	1.96 m (6 ft 5 in)		27 – 22 February 1999

Head coach

- (Slovakia) Maroš Kováčik

Assistant coach(es)

- (Poland) Tobiasz Łukaszyk

Legend

- (C) Team captain
- Injured

- Roster
Updated: June 1, 2026

== Season by season ==
Season	Tier	League	Pos	Polish Cup
2015–16	2	I Liga	1st	
2016–17	1	PLK	12th	
2017–18	1	PLK	15th	
2018–19	1	PLK	16th	
2019–20	2	I Liga	6th	
2020–21	2	I Liga	6th	
2021–22	2	I Liga	11th	
2022–23	2	I Liga	11th	
2023–24	2	I Liga	5th	
2024–25	2	I Liga	1st	
2025–26	1	PLK	16th	

== Honours ==
- I Liga

Champions (2): 2015–16, 2024–25

- PZKosz Cup

Champions (1): 2012–13

== Logos ==
Logo used until 2018
