= Mārtiņš Laksa =

Latvian basketball player

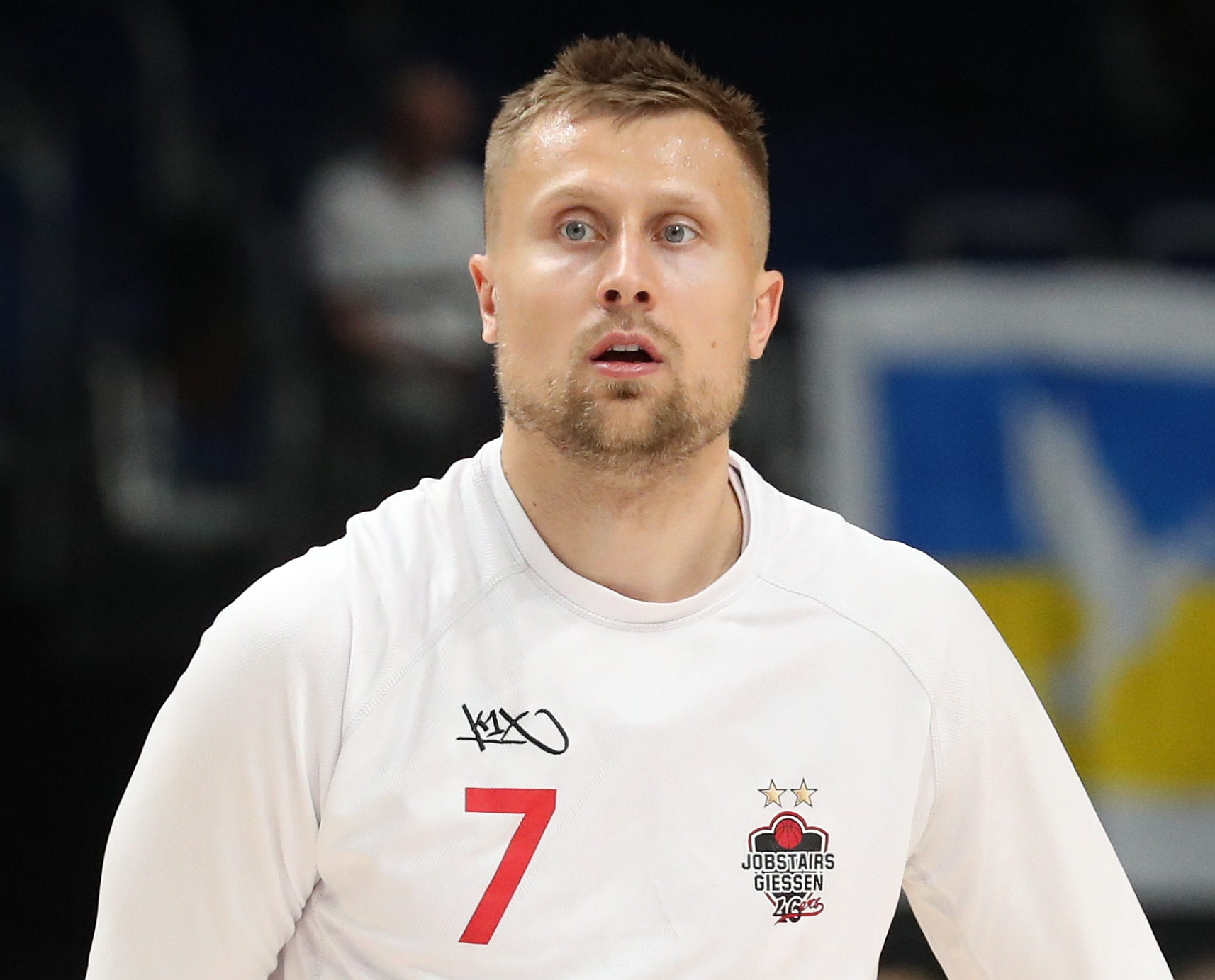

No. 39 – Miasto Szkła Krosno
- Position: Shooting guard
- League: PLK

Personal information
- Born: 26 June 1990 (age 36) Riga, Latvia
- Listed height: 1.98 m (6 ft 6 in)
- Listed weight: 92 kg (203 lb)

Career information
- Playing career: 2009–present

Career history
- 2009–2011: VEF Rīga
- 2011–2014: Ventspils
- 2014–2015: Jūrmala
- 2015–2017: Valmiera
- 2017–2019: Obradoiro
- 2019–2021: Start Lublin
- 2021: Estudiantes
- 2021–2022: Alba Fehérvár
- 2022: Gießen 46ers
- 2022–2023: CBet Jonava
- 2023–2025: GTK Gliwice
- 2026–present: Miasto Szkła Krosno

Career highlights
- Latvian League champion (2016)

Mārtiņš Laksa (born 26 June 1990) is a professional Latvian basketball player for Miasto Szkła Krosno of the Polish Basketball League (PLK).

== Professional career ==
Laksa started his career with ASK Rīga junior squad. In August 2009 Laksa tried out for Spanish club Bilbao Basket. Starting from 2009-2010 season Laksa played for VEF Rīga, where he spent three years. After playing in Riga Laksa made a move to BK Ventspils. He also played for the Spanish club Monbus Obradoiro in Liga ACB. In August 2021, Laksa signed with Alba Fehérvár of the Hungarian Nemzeti Bajnokság I/A. He averaged 12.7 points, 4.2 rebounds, and 1.5 assists per game. On January 22, 2022, Laksa signed with Gießen 46ers of the Basketball Bundesliga.

On August 4, 2023, he signed with GTK Gliwice of the Polish Basketball League (PLK).

On January 13, 2026, he signed with Miasto Szkła Krosno of the Polish Basketball League (PLK).

== International career ==
Laksa has represented the Latvian national youth team and Latvian men's national team in several competitions.

== Personal life ==
Mārtiņš Laksa is son of former Latvian NT player Jānis Laksa.
