= Kacper Marchewka =

Polish basketball player (born 2002)

No. 9 – Trefl Sopot
- Position: Shooting guard
- League: PLK

Personal information
- Born: 24 July 2002 (age 24) Poland
- Listed height: 1.96 m (6 ft 5 in)
- Listed weight: 212 lb (96 kg)

Career information
- Playing career: 2017–present

Career history
- 2017–2020: Śląsk II Wrocław Academy
- 2019–2021: Śląsk Wrocław Academy
- 2020–2021: Śląsk II Wrocław
- 2020–2022: Śląsk Wrocław
- 2022—2024: Arka Gdynia
- 2024–2026: Górnik Wałbrzych
- 2026–present: Trefl Sopot
Medals
Men's Basketball
Śląsk Wrocław
Polish League (PLK)
Gold medal – first place	2022
Bronze medal – third place	2021
Polish U19 Championships
Silver medal – second place	Gliwice 2021
Bronze medal – third place	Kraków 2019
Polish U17 Championships
Bronze medal – third place	Gdańsk 2019
Polish U15 Championships
Silver medal – second place	Wrocław 2018
Górnik Wałbrzych
Polish Cup (PP)
Gold medal – first place	2025
Poland
FIBA U18 European Championship Division B
Silver medal – second place	Romania 2019

Kacper Marchewka is a professional Polish basketball player for Trefl Sopot in Polish Basketball League (PLK), playing as a shooting guard.

== Professional career ==
A product of Śląsk Wrocław's academy, he won the under-18 national title in 2020 where he was named MVP of the tournament. His PLK debut was also at Śląsk, and he went on to win the title with them.

On 4 August 2022 he joined Arka Gdynia. Arka had a policy of recruiting very young players with potential, and after a season in the summer of 2023 he was only one of four players to stay at the club (the others being Bartłomiej Wołoszyn, Adam Hrycaniuk and Adrian Bogucki).

After two seasons he joined Górnik Wałbrzych in the summer of 2024. Górnik was promoted from the second tier by becoming champions at the end of 2023–24 season after spending 15 years in the lower leagues. In the club's maiden PLK season, Marchewka was part of the squad that triumphed in the 2025 Polish Cup, the club's first in its history. At Górnik, Marchewka averaged 3.6ppg, 2.0rpg, and 1.3apg in 24 league games in 2026, where he played a key role in helping Górnik reach the Polish Cup semi-finals that year.

He rejected a contract extension offered by Górnik in 2026 in favour of working with his former coach at Arka, Krzysztof Roszyk, now at tricity rivals Trefl Sopot. In July 2026 he was confirmed as the first and one of the main signings for Trefl ahead of the upcoming season.

== Achievements ==
=== Team ===
==== Śląsk Wrocław ====
- PLK
  - Champion gold medal: 2022
  - Bronze medal: 2021
- Eurocup
  - Participant: 2021–22
- U-20 EuroChallenge
  - Participant
- Polish U-19 championship:
  - Vice-champion silver medal: 2021
  - Bronze medal: 2019
- Polish U-17 championship
  - Bronze medal: 2019
- Polish U-15 championship
  - Vice-champion silver medal: 2018

==== Górnik Wałbrzych ====
- Polish Cup
  - Gold medal: 2025

=== Individual ===
- Polish championship squad inclusion:
  - U-19: 2021
  - U-17: 2019
  - U-15: 2018

=== International ===
- U-18 EuroBasket Division B:
  - Vice-Champion silver medal: 2019
- U-20 EuroBasket
  - Participant (13th): 2022
