= Stefan Majer =

Polish basketball player (1929–2020)

Personal information
- Born: 29 October 1929 Warsaw, Poland
- Died: 5 August 2020 (aged 90)

Career information
- Playing career: 1951–1959
- Coaching career: 1967–present

Career history

Playing
- 1951–1959: Legia Warszawa
- ?–?: Polish National Team

Coaching
- 1967–1971: Legia Warszawa
- 1975–1977: Lech Poznań
- 1980: Polish National Team
- 1981–1982: Legia Warszawa

Stefan Majer (29 October 1929 – 5 August 2020) was a Polish professional basketball player and coach.

== Awards ==
=== As a Player ===
- Polish Basketball League Championship (1956, 1957)

=== As a Coach ===
- Polish Basketball League Championship (1969)
- Polish Basketball Cup Champion (1968, 1970)
