= Garrett Nevels =

American basketball player

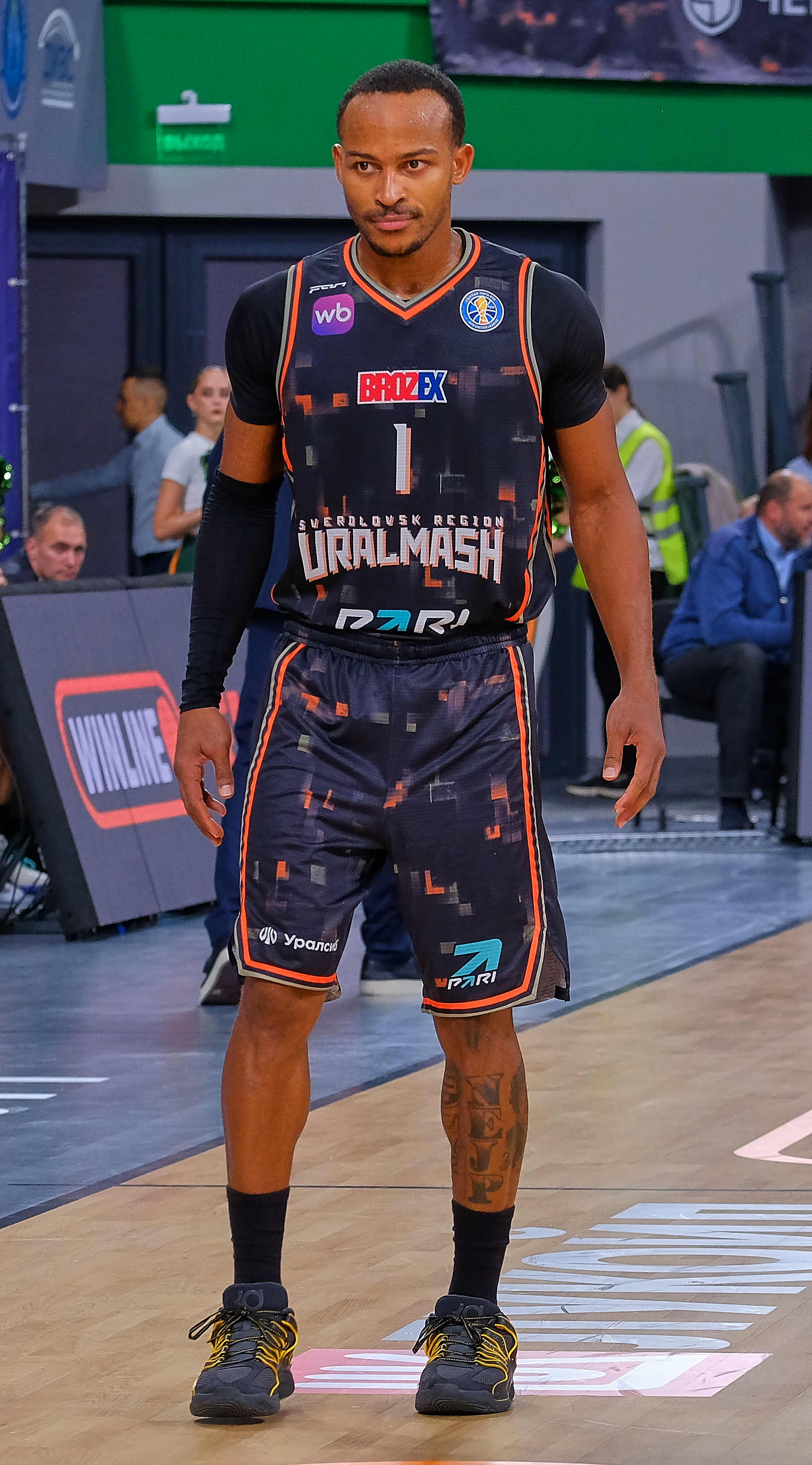
- Nevels with BC Uralmash in 2025

No. 12 – Longobardi Scafati Basket
- Position: Shooting guard
- League: LBA

Personal information
- Born: November 26, 1992 (age 33) Los Angeles, California
- Listed height: 6 ft 2 in (1.88 m)
- Listed weight: 190 lb (86 kg)

Career information
- High school: Palisades Charter (Los Angeles, California)
- College: Mt. San Antonio (2011–2013); Hawaii (2013–2015)
- NBA draft: 2015: undrafted
- Playing career: 2015–present

Career history
- 2015–2016: Albacete Basket
- 2016–2017: Força Lleida
- 2017–2018: Pallacanestro Reggiana
- 2018–2019: Gipuzkoa Basket
- 2019–2020: Agua Caliente Clippers
- 2020–2021: Śląsk Wrocław
- 2021: FC Porto
- 2021–2022: FMP
- 2022–2023: Trefl Sopot
- 2023–2024: Uralmash Yekaterinburg
- 2024-2025: Parma
- 2025–2026: Uralmash Yekaterinburg
- 2026–present: Scafati Basket

Career highlights
- Polish Cup MVP (2023); Polish Cup winner (2023)

Garrett Keith Nevels (born November 26, 1992) is an American professional basketball player for Scafati Basket of the Lega Basket Serie A (LBA). He played college basketball for Hawaii.

== Early life and high school ==
Nevels was born and grew up in Los Angeles, California and attended Palisades Charter High School. As a senior, he led the Dolphins with 20.7 points and 5.5 rebounds per game and was named second team All-City and first team All-Western League.

== College career ==
=== Mt. San Antonio College ===
Nevels began his collegiate career at Mt. San Antonio College. As a sophomore 19.8 points and 5.6 rebounds and was named the MVP of the California Community College Athletic Association (CCCAA) State Tournament as he led the Mounties to their first junior college state title. He committed to play for Hawaii for his final two years of eligibility.

=== Hawaii ===
Nevels immediately became a starter for the Hawaii Rainbow Warriors in his first season, starting 30 of 31 games and averaging 13.1 points per game while shooting 41 percent on three-point attempts. As a senior, Nevels was second on the team 10.8 points per game and 28 three-pointers made while leading the Warriors with a .771 free throw percentage.

== Professional career ==
Nevels signed with Albacete Basket of the Spanish fourth division, Liga EBA, on August 20, 2015. In his first professional season, he averaged 20.5 points (4th-highest in the league), 6.3 rebounds, 1.5 assists and 2.2 steals in 29 games as Albacete won the EBA Final Stage 4 title and was promoted to the third division.

Nevels signed with Força Lleida CE of the Spanish second division (LEB Oro) for the 2016–2017 season. He averaged 16.4 points and 3.4 assists per game in 34 LEB Oro games.

Nevels signed with Pallacanestro Reggiana of the Italian Lega Basket Serie A (LBA) on August 1, 2018. He averages 8.3 points, 3.1 rebounds and 1.1 assists over nine LBA games and 5.9 points, 1.8 rebounds and 1.1 steals in 14 EuroCup games.

Nevels signed with Gipuzkoa Basket of Liga ACB on July 26, 2018. Nevels appeared in all 34 of Gipuzkoa's games, starting 29, and averaged 11.6 points, 4.3 rebounds, 1.9 assists and 1.1 assists per game as the team finished 17th in Liga ACB and was relegated to LEB Oro.

Nevels was named to the roster of the G League's Agua Caliente Clippers on October 27, 2019, after a successful tryout. Nevels averaged 5.3 points, 3.3 rebounds, 2.0 assists, and 1.2 steals in 33 games played for Agua Caliente.

On July 14, 2020, he has signed with Śląsk Wrocław of the Polish Basketball League.

On July 12, 2021, Nevels signed a contract with FMP.

On October 1, 2022, he has signed with Trefl Sopot of the Polish Basketball League.

On August 12, 2026, he signed with Scafati Basket of the Lega Basket Serie A (LBA).
