= Mikko Larkas =

Finnish basketball coach (b.1981)

Szolnoki Olajbányász
- Position: Head coach
- League: Nemzeti Bajnokság I/A; Europe Cup

Personal information
- Born: 22 June 1981 (age 45)
- Coaching career: 2007–present

Career history

Coaching
- 2009–2012: Espoo United (women)
- 2013–2019: Helsinki Seagulls
- 2016–2024: Finland (assistant)
- 2023–2024: SIG Strasbourg (assistant)
- 2024–2025: Limoges (assistant)
- 2025: Limoges
- 2025–2026: Trefl Sopot
- 2026–present: Szolnoki Olajbányász

Career highlights
- Polish Cup winner (2026)

Mikko Larkas (born 22 June 1981) is a Finnish professional basketball coach who is currently the head coach of Szolnoki Olajbányász of the Nemzeti Bajnokság I/A.

Previously he has coached in his native Finland and France, and has been the assistant coach of Finland’s national basketball team during 2016–2024.
