= Cleveland Melvin =

American basketball player

No. 2 – Iraklis Thessaloniki
- Position: Power forward
- League: Greek Basketball League; FIBA Europe Cup

Personal information
- Born: June 25, 1991 (age 35) Baltimore, Maryland, U.S.
- Listed height: 2.03 m (6 ft 8 in)
- Listed weight: 205 lb (93 kg)

Career information
- High school: Lake Clifton (Baltimore, Maryland)
- College: DePaul (2010–2014)
- NBA draft: 2014: undrafted
- Playing career: 2014–present

Career history
- 2014: Erie BayHawks
- 2014–2015: Jefes de Fuerza Lagunera
- 2015: Fuerza Guinda de Nogales
- 2015: Alba Fehérvár
- 2015–2016: Los Angeles D-Fenders
- 2016: Mono Vampire
- 2016–2017: Al Mouttahed Tripoli
- 2017–2018: Cibona
- 2018: Hapoel Gilboa Galil
- 2018–2019: MKS Dąbrowa Górnicza
- 2019–2021: King Szczecin
- 2021–2022: Start Lublin
- 2022: Atomerőmű SE
- 2022–2023: Start Lublin
- 2023–2024: FC Porto
- 2024–2025: Cholet Basket
- 2025–2026: PAOK Thessaloniki
- 2026–present: Iraklis Thessaloniki

Career highlights
- Portuguese Cup winner (2024); Big East Rookie of the Year (2011)

Cleveland Hubert Melvin III (born June 25, 1991) is an American professional basketball player for Iraklis Thessaloniki of the Greek Basketball League (GBL) and the FIBA Europe Cup. Standing at 2.03 m, he plays primarily at the power forward position.

== College career ==
Melvin played college basketball for the DePaul Blue Demons from 2010 to 2014. He was named the Big East Rookie of the Year in 2011 and finished his college career with averages of 16.3 points and 6.4 rebounds per game. In 110 appearances for DePaul, he ranked among the program's career leaders in scoring, rebounding, blocked shots and field goals made.

== Professional career ==
After going undrafted in the 2014 NBA draft, Melvin began his professional career with the Erie BayHawks of the NBA Development League. During the 2014–15 season, he played in Mexico for Jefes de Fuerza Lagunera and Fuerza Guinda de Nogales, before joining Hungarian club Alba Fehérvár. He later returned to the Development League with the Los Angeles D-Fenders and also played for Mono Vampire in Thailand and Al Moutahed Tripoli in Lebanon.

Melvin established himself in European basketball from the 2017–18 season onwards. He played for Cibona in Croatia and Hapoel Gilboa Galil in Israel, before spending several seasons in Poland with MKS Dąbrowa Górnicza, King Szczecin and Start Lublin. During the 2021–22 season, he also had a short spell with Hungarian club Atomerőmű SE.

In July 2023, Melvin signed with FC Porto. During the 2023–24 FIBA Europe Cup, he averaged 17.0 points, 6.2 rebounds and 1.4 assists per game for the Portuguese club. He spent the following season with Cholet Basket in France.

For the 2025–26 season, Melvin joined PAOK. He helped the club reach the 2025–26 FIBA Europe Cup Finals, averaging 14.6 points and 4.2 rebounds in 17 games. At the end of the competition, he had scored 660 career points in 49 FIBA Europe Cup appearances, moving into the top ten of the competition's all-time scoring list.

On June 3, 2026, Melvin signed a two-year contract with Iraklis.
