= Andrzej Adamek =

Polish basketball player and coach

Górnik Wałbrzych
- Title: Head coach
- League: PLK

Personal information
- Born: 6 January 1972 (age 54) Wałbrzych, Poland
- Listed height: 6 ft 2 in (1.88 m)
- Listed weight: 196 lb (89 kg)

Career information
- Playing career: 1988–2004
- Position: Shooting guard

Career history

Playing
- 1988–1995: Górnik Wałbrzych
- 1995–1998: Polonia Przemyśl
- 1998: UMKS Kielce
- 1998–2002: Śląsk Wrocław
- 1999: → Czarni Słupsk
- 2000–2001: → Prokom Sopot
- 2002–2003: Znicz Pruszków
- 2003–2004: Helsingborg
- 2004: Górnik Wałbrzych

Coaching
- 2004–2006: Górnik Wałbrzych
- 2005–2007: Poland (assistant)
- 2006–2007: Śląsk Wrocław (assistant)
- 2007–2008: Śląsk Wrocław
- 2008–2009: Śląsk Wrocław (assistant)
- 2009: Górnik Wałbrzych
- 2009: Turów Zgorzelec (assistant)
- 2009–2011: Prokom Gdynia (assistant)
- 2011–2013: Prokom Gdynia
- 2013–2014: Zastal Zielona Góra (assistant)
- 2014–2015: Zastal Zielona Góra
- 2015–2018: Zastal Zielona Góra (assistant)
- 2019: Śląsk Wrocław
- 2019–2020: Mono Vampire (assistant)
- 2019–2022: Poland U-18
- 2021–2023: Śląsk Wrocław (assistant)
- 2023–present: Górnik Wałbrzych

Career highlights
- As player: 3× Polish League champion (1999, 2000, 2002); 2x Polish League bronze medalist (1996, 2001); Polish Cup winner (2001); 2× Polish Basketball Supercup winner (1999, 2000); As head coach: Polish League champion (2012); Polish Cup winner (2015); FIBA U-18 Division B European Championship runner-up (2019); I Liga champion (2024); Polish Cup winner (2025)

Andrzej Adamek (born 6 January 1972) is a Polish basketball coach and former professional basketball player.

== Early career ==
Adamek was born on 6 January 1972, in Wałbrzych, Poland, where he began playing basketball. In 1995–96, he moved to Polonia Przemyśl, where he achieved success, helping the team secure a Polish vice-championship. In 1998, he came back to Lower Silesia to join Zepter Idea Śląsk Wrocław, leaving Polonia Przemyśl due to the team's financial problems and declining league performance. However, his time in Wrocław was less impactful; he was not among the teams key players and seldom even made it to the bench. During the 1999–00 season, after talks with Slask's management, Adamek transferred to Kielce. Unfortunately, this step was not the best solution for Adamek, as he still played rarely. He later joined Prokom Trefl Sopot, where the start of the season seemed promising, with Adamek playing regularly. But when Prokom's signed Igor Miličić, everything changed. "Szkopek" had big difficulties with his place in the team again. In 2002 he came back to Wrocław and played for Idea Śląsk Wrocław. In 2003, he decided to play abroad and chose the Swedish league. He later returned to his hometown in 2004 and started to play and coach Górnik Wałbrzych. He retired definitely in 2005. He coached Górnik Wałbrzych in First Polish League (actually First Polish League is the second after the PLK). He has made a contribution to remain his team in First Polish League. In 2006 he was assistant coach in Śląsk Wrocław Adamek also has spent a short while as head coach of the Śląsk Wrocław.He took over the team when the management were looking for a new coach. He was a temporary head coach but he had a chance to show his skills in ULEB Cup.In the 2008–2009 season he began as assistant coach in Śląsk Wrocław. However - after the financial problems - Śląsk Wrocław was withdrawn from PLK. Adamek received an offer from the Górnik Wałbrzych and decided to take over the team. Because of the financial problems in Górnik, Adamek has moved to the Turów Zgorzelec where he is working as assistant coach of Paweł Turkiewicz. As assistant coach in Turów he has advanced to the national finals.

== Professional career ==
Andrzej Adamek was a multiple PLK champion with Śląsk Wrocław. He also was a runner-up with Polonia Przemyśl. Moreover, he performed for Polish national basketball team.

== Coaching career ==
He used to be called one of the most promising coaches of young generation in Poland. In 2006, he was named the Polish national basketball team assistant coach, to head coach Andrej Urlep. He was an assistant coach of the Polish Basketball National Team during the EuroBasket 2007 in Spain.

In 2012, Adamek won his first championship as the head coach. He is also a 7x Polish Basketball League champion, 2x runner-up and 1x bronze medalist.

Adamek is the former head coach of the U-18 Polish National Basketball Team. In 2019, his team was a runner-up in the FIBA U-18 Division B European Championships, held in Oradea, Romania, and advanced to the top flight Division A. In 2022, Adamek's team finished 9th in the FIBA U-18 European Championships, hosted by the city of İzmir, Turkey] Poland saved the Division A spot for another year.

In June 2023, Adamek became the head coach of Górnik Wałbrzych, his first club as player, then the tier-2 league team. He returned to his hometown after two successful years as the Śląsk Wrocław assistant coach, winning the 2022 Polish Basketball League championship and finishing as runner-up one campaign later. In 2023-24, Adamek's Górnik Wałbrzych clinched playoffs as the 2nd seed. Eventually, Górnik won the finals against Enea Abramczyk Astoria Bydgoszcz 3-1, despite trailing 0-1, and earned a spot in the Polish Basketball League. Górnik returned to top flight after 15 years in lower leagues.
