= Rodney Chatman =

American basketball player

Rodney Chatman III
No. 3 – Sheffield Sharks
- Position: Point guard
- League: SLB

Personal information
- Born: August 24, 1998 (age 28) Daytona Beach, Florida, US
- Listed height: 1.85 m (6 ft 1 in)
- Listed weight: 81 kg (179 lb)

Career information
- High school: Lithonia High School; (Lithonia, Georgia)
- College: Chattanooga (2016–2018); Dayton (2019-21); Vanderbilt (2021-22)
- NBA draft: 2022: undrafted
- Playing career: 2022–present

Career history
- 2022–2023: Team FOG Næstved
- 2023–2024: Stal Ostrów Wielkopolski
- 2024–present: Sheffield Sharks

Career highlights
- SLB Cup Winner (2025)

Rodney Chatman III (born August 24, 1998) is an American professional basketball player for Sheffield Sharks of the Super League Basketball (SLB).

== Playing career ==
After graduating from college, Chatman signed with Team FOG Næstved to start off his professional career in the Danish Basketligaen. With 19.1 points per game he led his team in scoring, as Næstved went to the first finals in its history.

In the summer of 2023, Chatman signed with Stal Ostrów Wielkopolski in the Polish Basketball League.

In 2024, chatman signed with the sheffield sharks and won the slb cup as his first professional basketball achievement

== Personal ==
Rodney's father, Rodney Chatman Jr., played college basketball for USC from 1990 to 1993. His mother played for Bethune–Cookman. He has two siblings, Bryce and Alexis.
