= Górnik Wałbrzych (basketball) =

- Nickname: Górnicy (The Miners)
- Leagues: Polish Basketball League
- Founded: 1946; 80 years ago
- History: Śniezka Aspro Świebodzice; 1994–95; Górnik Zamek Książ Wałbrzych; 2023–present
- Arena: Aqua Zdrój
- Capacity: 2,023
- Location: Wałbrzych, Poland
- Team colors: White-blue
- Main sponsor: Zamek Książ
- President: Jakub Lewandowski
- Head coach: Andrzej Adamek
- Team captain: Dariusz Wyka
- Ownership: Górnik Kosz.Plc
- Championships: 2 Polish League; 1 Polish Cup; 1 I Liga
- Retired numbers: 4, 5, 6, 9, 10, 12, 14
- Website: https://www.gornikwalbrzych.com.pl/
Home	Away

Górnik Wałbrzych is a Polish men's basketball team, based in Wałbrzych, southwestern Poland, currently in Polish Basketball League. Name 'Górnik' stands for 'Miner' as the city of Wałbrzych was known for its thriving mining industry until the early 90s.

== History ==
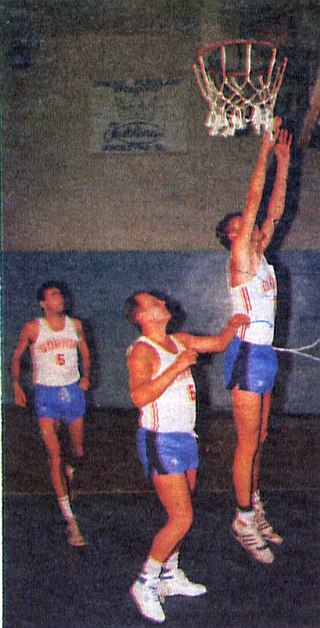
Players of Górnik Wałbrzych in 1990

Górnik was founded in 1946. The most famous departments - basketball and football, were opened in the same year. The basketball team in 1956 won promotion to the Division I, and in 1970 it appeared for the first time in the Polish top flight. Best years for Górnik's basketball team were the 1980s. In 1981, Górnik was Polish league runner-up, in 1982 it won its first championship. That season, club legend Mieczysław Młynarski set the single-game league record by scoring 90 points in a 133–109 win over Pogoń Szczecin. In 1983 and 1986, the club was a runner-up again. Górnik won its second Polish league title in 1988.

Then, in the 1990s, coal-mining industry in the city of Wałbrzych collapsed and, lacking sponsorship, Górnik started to decline. In 1995, the White and Blues left the top division due to poor financing, despite finishing 4th. Good times returned in the 2006–07 season, when Górnik, with a new sponsor and under the name Victoria-Górnik, won promotion to the elite Dominet Basket Liga. In the decisive round against Sportino Inowroclaw, Górnik was trailing 0-2 in the best od 5 series. Nevertheless, the club from Walbrzych had managed an impressive comeback and beat a stunned Sportino 3-2. The final game had taken place in front of a home sold out crowd that went ecstatic after the game came to an end.

In 2007–2008, the White and Blues finished 10th out of 13 teams with a record of 9–15. However, it was relegated to Division I after finishing in last place in the 2008–09 season.

From 2009 through 2011 Górnik played in the tier-2 league but missed playoffs in the first season and suffered relegation in the second. Due to financial deterioration, the club restructured and started over from the bottom, Division III (fourth-tier league). In 2013, Górnik Wałbrzych joined forces with the local rival, Górnik Nowe Miasto, also playing in the tier-4. The goal was to establish one, strong basketball program. Górnik spent three seasons in tier-4 and won promotion in 2014. From 2014 through 2017, the team was contending in Division II (tier-3) and planned to return to Division I (tier-2). In 2017–18 season, the White and Blues, playing a short rotation, unexpectedly reached the finals and finished second in Division II. Next year, the team advanced to Division I playoffs as 8th seed but lost in the first round (1-3) to no. 1 seed Śląsk Wrocław.

Season 2019-20 was suspended due to the COVID-19 pandemic in Poland. At that time, few games shy to close the regular season, Górnik was leading the Division I standings with 18–5 record. Later on, it was officially named the 2020 Division I Champion. Nevertheless, was not promoted to top flight.

The Miners had a three-year span (2021-2023) of reaching the Division I finals but finishing as runner-up in all of them and, in result, not advancing to tier-1 league.

By becoming champions at the end of 2023–24 season, Górnik Wałbrzych was promoted from the second tier, after spending 15 years in the lower leagues. The team entered play-off as 2nd seed.

In February 2025, Gornik upset King Szczecin 80-78 and won their first ever Polish Cup. Hundreds of Gornik fans stormed the court in Sosnowiec Arena after the buzzer, joining the celebration. The Miners ran away with victory in a thriller as Toddrick Gotcher made a 10-feet jumper with less than 2 seconds left on the clock.

The White and Blues finished the 2024-25 regular season on the 5th seed.In the playoffs first round, they'd come up short 1-3 to Legia Warsaw who later became the 2025 Polish League champions.

== Honours and achievements ==
Polish Basketball League:

- Winner (2): 1982, 1988
- Runner-up (3): 1981, 1983, 1986
- 4th place: 1989, 1995

Polish Cup:

- Winner (1): 2025

I Liga:

- Winner (2): 2020, 2024
- Runner-up (4): 2007, 2021, 2022, 2023

Youth leagues:

- U-14 Polish League - 4th place (2011)
- U-18 Polish League Champions (1979,1980)
- U-18 Polish League Bronze Medalist (2003)
- U-18 Polish League - 4th place (2002)
- U-20 Polish League Runner-up (2000)

== Notable players ==
- (Poland) Mieczysław Młynarski
- (Poland) Stanisław Kiełbik
- (Poland) Tadeusz Reschke
- (Poland) Andrzej Adamek
- (Poland) Adam Waczyński
- (Poland) Kamil Chanas
- (United States) Jeremy Montgomery
- (Poland) Rafał Glapiński
- (Poland) Aleksander Balcerowski

== Retired Numbers ==
- 4. Zenon Kozłowski

Forward, 2nd most games all time for Górnik (1974-90), with Górnik: 2x Polish League Champion, 3x runner-up

Note: It was agreed that Damian Durski, the product of club's academy and current team captain, is eligible to wear no 4.

- 5. Tadeusz Reschke

Center, member of Polish National Team, with Górnik: 2x Polish League Champion, 3x runner-up

- 6. Wojciech Krzykała

Point Guard. With Górnik: 2x Polish League Champion, 3x runner-up

- 9. Ryszard Wieczorek

Forward. 2x Polish League Champion with Górnik, 1981 runner-up

- 10. Jerzy Żywarski

Shooting Guard. 2x Polish League Champion with Górnik, 3x runner-up

- 12. Mieczysław Młynarski

Forward. Member of Polish National Team, 3rd Top Scorer of the 1980 Olympics, 2x EuroBasket Top Scorer, 5th All-Time Polish League Top Scorer (total points), 90 points scored in a single game of tier-1 Polish League (1982). 1982 Polish League Champion with Górnik, 3x runner-up

- 14. Stanisław Kiełbik

Guard. Member of Polish National Team. 2x Polish League Champion with Górnik, 2x runner-up

== Seasons ==
Season	Tier	League	Pos	Head Coach
1999–00	2	Division I	3rd	Chodkiewicz
2000–01	2	Division I	11th	Chodkiewicz
2001–02	3	Division II	4th	Młynarski
2002–03	3	Division II	5th	Młynarski
2003–04	3	Division II	1st	Krzykała
2004–05	2	Division I	12th	Adamek, Krzykała (sacked)
2005–06	2	Division I	10th	Adamek
2006–07	2	Division I	2nd	Czerniak
2007–08	1	PLK	13th	Czerniak
2008–09	1	PLK	14th	Młynarski, Adamek (sacked), Chudeusz (sacked)
2009–10	2	Division I	14th	Chlebda, Chodkiewicz (sacked)
2010–11	2	Division I	15th	Chlebda
2011–12	4	Division III	7th	Chlebda
2012–13	4	Division III	7th	Chlebda
2013–14	4	Division III	1st	Chlebda
2014–15	3	Division II	2R	Chlebda
2015–16	3	Division II	QF	Chlebda
2016–17	3	Division II	QF	Chlebda
2017–18	3	Division II	2nd	Radomski
2018–19	2	Division I	8th	Radomski
2019–20	2	Division I	1st	Grudniewski
2020–21	2	Division I	2nd	Grudniewski
2021–22	2	Division I	2nd	Grudniewski
2022–23	2	Division I	2nd	Radomski
2023–24	2	Division I	1st	Adamek
2024–25	1	PLK	5th	Adamek
2025–26	1	PLK	11th	Adamek

== Players ==
=== Current roster ===
Note: Flags indicate national team eligibility at FIBA-sanctioned events. Players may hold other non-FIBA nationalities not displayed.

Górnik Wałbrzych roster
Players
Coaches

Pos.	No.	Nat.	Name	Ht.
F/C	00	(Poland)	Wyka, Dariusz (C)	2.09 m (6 ft 10 in)	34 – 3 December 1991
SF	0	(Poland)	Szelążek, Soprano	1.96 m (6 ft 5 in)	20 – 13 March 2006
PG	1	(United States)	Scott, Mike	1.83 m (6 ft 0 in)	33 – 10 August 1993
G	2	(United States)	Curry, Ron	1.90 m (6 ft 3 in)	33 – 12 July 1993
G/F	3	(United States)	Smith, Ike (injured)	1.93 m (6 ft 4 in)	29 – 5 July 1997
F	7	(United States)	Diggs, Trey	1.98 m (6 ft 6 in)	27 – 27 February 1999
F	8	(United States)	Rohosy, A.J.	2.06 m (6 ft 9 in)	23 – 14 January 2003
SG	11	(Estonia)	Böckler, Leemet	1.98 m (6 ft 6 in)	25 – 7 April 2001
C	20	(Poland)	Karwik, Maksymilian	2.06 m (6 ft 9 in)	21 – 22 September 2005
F	21	(Poland)	Bojanowski, Maciej	2.00 m (6 ft 7 in)	30 – 20 May 1996
SF	23	(Poland)	Puchalski, Maciej	2.05 m (6 ft 9 in)	22 – 30 September 2004
PF	25	(Poland)	Nowakowski, Michał	2.05 m (6 ft 9 in)	38 – 18 June 1988
C	33	(United States)	Goins, Kenny	2.01 m (6 ft 7 in)	30 – 11 September 1996

Head coach

- (Poland) Andrzej Adamek

Assistant coach(es)

- (Serbia) Zoran Čarapić
- (Poland) Adrian Mroczek-Truskowski
- (United States) David Jackson

Legend

- (C) Team captain
- Injured

- Roster
Updated: October 7, 2026

=== Notable players ===
- (Poland) Andrzej Adamek
- (Poland) Kamil Chanas
- (Poland) Rafał Glapiński
- (Poland) Stanisław Kiełbik
- (Poland) Mieczysław Młynarski
- (Poland) Tadeusz Reschke
- (Poland) Adam Waczyński
- (Poland) Aleksander Balcerowski
- (United States) Jeremy Montgomery
