= Legia Warsaw (basketball) =

- Nickname: Wojskowi (The Militarians); Legioniści (The Legionnaires)
- League: PLK; Champions League
- Founded: 1929; 97 years ago
- History: Legia Warsaw; 1929–present
- Arena: Hala OSiR Bemowo; Cos Torwar
- Capacity: 1,416; 4,824 (for BCL games)
- Location: Warsaw, Poland
- Team colors: White, Black, Green and Red
- President: Robert Chabelski
- General manager: Aaron Cel
- Head coach: Heiko Rannula
- Team captain: Michał Kolenda
- Championships: 9 Polish Championships; 3 Polish Cups; 1 Polish Supercup; 1 I Liga
- Website: legiakosz.com
Home	Away

Legia Warszawa Sekcja Koszykówki (in English: Legia Warsaw Basketball Section) is a Polish men's basketball club, based in Warsaw. The team currently plays in the PLK, the Polish first division. The club was established in 1929 as the basketball section of the military multi-sport club of Legia Warsaw. Legia became the leading team in Polish basketball in the 1950s and 1960s with seven national championships and two national cups.

It is one of the sports sections of Legia brand, with the most famous being a football team.

== History ==
=== First steps to glory ===
The basketball section of Legia Warsaw was founded in 1929. The first game of the team was on December 8, 1929, when the team won 31–5 over Jutrznia.

The team was re-activated in 1947, after absence during World War II, by students from the Stefana Batorego. The team won the national high school championship, and after several more promotions, it returned to the highest-level league in 1951.

Legia played its first international match on September 6, 1953, facing UDA Praha. In 1956, the first national championship in club history was won after finishing first with a 14–4 record. A year after winning that competition, Legia's basketball players once again won the Polish championship. Then it took five overtimes to determine the winner in the Legia – ŁKS game. The Łódź Sports Club, competing at the time as Włókniarz Łódź, ultimately defeated Legia 77–75. For Legia, it was the only loss out of five games in this phase of the competition, and secured the Polish championship.

Legia's basketball players were the first Polish team to represent the country in European cup competitions. Their second consecutive Polish championship in 1957 secured team's participation in the FIBA European Champions Cup the following year. In the second round, Legia faced the best team in Europe at that time Rīgas ASK. Although the victory in Warsaw did not allow them to advance to the semifinals, it was a huge surprise for the basketball community in Europe. Legia became powerhouse in Poland, winning 7 national titles in 13 years in the 1950s and 1960s, as well as 2 Polish cups.

=== Financial difficulties lead to downfall ===
Unfortunately, in the 2002–03 season, Legia, instead of building on their momentum, ended their adventure in the top league for many years. This was due to the club's severe financial problems, which prevented them from paying the players' contractual obligations. Most of the basketball players left the club, and Legia finished the season with juniors. The youth players were unable to save Legia's position in the top league.

In the following season, after many troubles, Legia finally played in the First League with a very strong squad that was expected to fight for a return to the national elite. Unfortunately, Legia performed below expectations – they advanced to the playoffs from the eighth place and lost 0–3 to Turów Zgorzelec in the first round of the playoffs. Warsaw continued to struggle with financial problems, resulting in the team not registering for the First League. Legia spent the 2003–04 season in the Second League, which was the third tier of national championship, and even at this level had to fight against relegation.

On May 15, 2014, the team was brought under a new legal form when the joint-stock company "Legia Warszawa Sekcja Koszykówki" was founded; the main shareholders of the club are Legia Warszawa SA and Robert Chabelski. In 2017, Legia was promoted to the PLK after being absent for 14 years.

=== Regaining its status in Poland ===
In 2020–21 season for the first time since promoted back to the PLK, Legia finished the season with a positive record, winning 24 of 37 games and finishing fourth. That let the team to participate in FIBA Europe Cup. 2021–22 season was successful both internationally and locally, reaching the FIBA Europe Cup quarterfinal and PLK final for the first time since 1969. The European run continued when Legia participated in 2022–23 Basketball Champions League and 2023–24 FIBA Europe Cup.

In 2024 Legia won the Polish Basketball Cup for the first time in 44 years.

After the end of the 2023–24 PLK season, in which they finished fifth, club started a rebuilding process. First step was to hire a new sports director in Aaron Cel. Later that summer it was announced that a new coach would take over the team as Legia signed a contract with Croatian specialist Ivica Skelin. Long-time captain of Legia, Dariusz Wyka, left the team. After not getting a place in any of the more prestigious European competitions, Legia joined up-and-coming ENBL.

In February 2025, Legia surprisingly changed coaches as Heiko Rannula was appointed the new head coach. He led the team to its first Polish Championship in 56 years.

== Arena ==
Legia basketball players played in the former riding school hall which was adapted from a former riding school in the 1950s for the needs of indoor sports. At the start of the 1992–93 season Legia basketball team moved to the current Hala OSiR Bemowo facility. The hall in which basketball players play today was converted from a former aircraft hangar to the needs of indoor sports.

For European games Legia has used the Arena COS Torwar.

== Roster ==
=== Current roster ===
Note: Flags indicate national team eligibility at FIBA-sanctioned events. Players may hold other non-FIBA nationalities not displayed.

Legia Warsaw roster
Players
Coaches

Pos.	No.	Nat.	Name	Ht.	Wt.	Age
PF	1	(Poland)	Wojciechowski, Mathieu	2.03 m (6 ft 8 in)	94 kg (207 lb)	34 – 20 October 1992
C	2	(Poland)	Niedziałkowski, Dawid	2.03 m (6 ft 8 in)		19 – 1 June 2007
SG	3	(United States)	Daniels, Devon	1.96 m (6 ft 5 in)	91 kg (201 lb)	28 – 18 July 1998
SG	5	(Poland)	Tomaszewski, Wojciech	1.98 m (6 ft 6 in)	85 kg (187 lb)	24 – 20 February 2002
G	6	(Latvia)	Zoriks, Kristers	1.93 m (6 ft 4 in)	86 kg (190 lb)	28 – 25 May 1998
C	7	(Hungary)	Golomán, György	2.11 m (6 ft 11 in)	102 kg (225 lb)	30 – 2 April 1996
C	10	(Croatia)	Vranković, Antonio	2.13 m (7 ft 0 in)	122 kg (269 lb)	30 – 28 October 1996
PG	11	(Poland)	Czapla, Błażej	1.83 m (6 ft 0 in)		18 – 19 December 2007
F/C	18	(Poland)	Tomczak, Szymon	2.01 m (6 ft 7 in)	104 kg (229 lb)	28 – 17 January 1998
G/F	23	(Poland)	Kolenda, Michał (C)	2.02 m (6 ft 8 in)	88 kg (194 lb)	29 – 31 March 1997
SF	25	(United States)	Christmas, Michael	1.98 m (6 ft 6 in)	102 kg (225 lb)	26 – 1 January 2000
PF	32	(United States)	Freemantle, Zach	2.06 m (6 ft 9 in)	103 kg (227 lb)	26 – 18 October 2000
PF	35	(Estonia)	Ilver, Markus	2.06 m (6 ft 9 in)	102 kg (225 lb)	24 – 30 January 2002
G/F	95	(Poland)	Andrzejewski, Jakub	1.90 m (6 ft 3 in)		22 – 18 September 2004
G		(United States)	Jones, Rubin	1.96 m (6 ft 5 in)	86 kg (190 lb)	25 – 22 October 2001

Head coach

- (Estonia) Heiko Rannula

Assistant coach(es)

- (Poland) Maciej Jamrozik
- (Poland) Maciej Jankowski

Strength & conditioning coach(es)

- (France) Samuel Covelli

Legend

- (C) Team captain
- Injured

- Roster
Updated: November 16, 2026

=== Depth chart ===
Pos.	Starting 5	Bench 1	Bench 2
C	György Golomán	Szymon Tomczak	Dawid Niedziałkowski
PF	Zach Freemantle	Markus Ilver
SF	Michael Christmas	Michał Kolenda	Jakub Andrzejewski
SG	Devon Daniels	Wojciech Tomaszewski
PG	Kristers Zoriks	Błażej Czapla	Błażej Czapla

== First Team staff ==
Position	Staff
Head coach	(Estonia) Heiko Rannula
Assistant coach	(Poland) Maciej Jamrozik
Assistant coach	(Poland) Maciej Jankowski
Physical Trainer	(France) Samuel Covelli
Physical Trainer	(Poland) Radosław Senski
Physiotherapist	(Poland) Jakub Nowosad
Manager	(Poland) Maciej Jankowski
Doctor	(Poland) Mateusz Dawidziuk

Last updated: 16 July 2025
Source: Legia Warsaw Website

== Personnel ==
Chairman	(Poland) Robert Chabelski
Vice-President	(Poland) Lukasz Sekula
Shareholder	(Poland) Jarosław Jankowski
Sports Director	(Poland) (France) Aaron Cel

== Honours ==
Total titles: 11

=== Domestic competitions ===
- Polish Championship:
  - Winners (9): 1956, 1957, 1960, 1961, 1963, 1966, 1969, 2025, 2026
  - Runners-up (1): 2022
- Polish Cup:
  - Winners (3): 1968, 1970, 2024
- I Liga
  - Winners (1): 2017

== Season by season ==
Season	Tier	League	Pos.	Record	Polish Cup
2011–12	4	3 Liga	1st		
2012–13	3	2 Liga	3rd		
2013–14	3	2 Liga	1st		
2014–15	2	I Liga	4th		
2015–16	2	I Liga	2nd		
2016–17	2	I Liga	1st		
2017–18	1	PLK	16th	5–27	Quarterfinalist
2018–19	1	PLK	8th	15–15	
2019–20	1	PLK	14th^{1}	5–17^{1}	Quarterfinalist
2020–21	1	PLK	4th	24–13	Quarterfinalist
2021–22	1	PLK	Runners-up	24–17	
2022–23	1	PLK	4th	24–13	
2023–24	1	PLK	5th	20–14	Champion
2024–25	1	PLK	Champion	29–15	Quarterfinalist
2025–26	1	PLK	Champion	32–12	Quarterfinalist

^1 Cancelled due to the COVID-19 pandemic in Europe.

== International record ==
Season	Achievement	Notes
Euroleague
1958	Quarter-finals	eliminated by Rīgas ASK, 59–93 (L) in Riga and 63–61 (W) in Warsaw
1960–61	Quarter-finals	eliminated by CSKA Moscow, 72–98 (L) in Warsaw and 73–85 (L) in Moscow
1961–62	Quarter-finals	eliminated by Real Madrid, 73–62 (W) in Warsaw and 71–100 (L) in Madrid
1963–64	Quarter-finals	eliminated by Real Madrid, 90–102 (L) in Warsaw and 86–92 (L) in Madrid
Saporta Cup
1968–69	Quarter-finals	eliminated by Slavia Prague, 82–113 (L) in Prague and 80–91 (L) in Warsaw
1970–71	Quarter-finals	eliminated by Fides Napoli, 75–84 (L) in Warsaw and 73–96 (L) in Naples
FIBA Europe Cup
2021–22	Quarter-finals	eliminated by Reggiana, 68–71 (L) in Warsaw and 80–75 after overtime (L) in Reggio Emilia
2023–24	Quarter-finals	eliminated by Bilbao Basket, 83–64 (W) in Warsaw and 53–81 (L) in Bilbao
Basketball Champions League
2022–23	Group stage	eliminated in the Group stage
European North Basketball League
2024–25	Quarter-finals	eliminated by CSO Voluntari, 81–95 (L) in Warsaw and 87–102 (L) in Voluntari

== Notable players ==
=== Notable players ===
Note: Flags indicate national team eligibility at FIBA-sanctioned events. Players may hold other non-FIBA nationalities not displayed.

Criteria

To appear in this section a player must have either:

- Set a club record or won an individual award while at the club
- Played at least one official international match for their national team at any time
- Played at least one official NBA match at any time.

- (Poland) Lukasz Koszarek
- (Poland) Marcel Ponitka
- (Poland) Cezary Trybański
- (Poland) Andrzej Pluta Jr.
- (Latvia) Jānis Bērziņš
- (United States) / (Poland) Geoff Groselle
- (Latvia) Ojārs Siliņš
- (United States) Kameron McGusty

== Coaches ==
=== Notable former coaches ===
- (Poland) Tadeusz Ulatowski 1951–1959
- (Poland) Władysław Maleszewski 1959–1967
- (Poland) Stefan Majer 1967–1971, 1981–1982
- (Poland) Andrzej Pstrokonski 1971–1975
- (Poland) Wladyslaw Pawlak 1975–1981
- (Poland) Adam Wielgosz 1982–1984
- (Poland) Richard Pietruszak 1984–1986
- (Poland) Jan Kwasiborski 1986–1988
- (Poland) Marek Jablonski 1988–1990
- (Poland) Adam Wielgosz 1990–1991
- (Ukraine) Alexander Salnikov 1991–1992
- (Poland) Jan Kwasiborski 1992–1996
- (Poland) Robert Chabelski 1996–1998, 2004–2012
- (Poland) Marek Jablonski 1998–2001
- (Poland) Jacek Gembal 2001–2004
- (Poland) Piotr Bakun 2012–2018
- (North Macedonia) Tane Spasev 2018–2020
- (Poland) Wojciech Kaminski 2020–2024
- (Croatia) Ivica Skelin 2024–2025
- (Estonia) Heiko Rannula 2025–present
