= Trefl Sopot =

- Leagues: PLK
- Founded: 2009; 17 years ago
- History: Trefl Sopot (2009–present)
- Arena: Ergo Arena
- Capacity: 15,000
- Location: Sopot, Poland
- Team colors: Yellow and Black
- President: Marek Wierzbicki
- Head coach: Krzysztof Roszyk
- Team captain: Jakub Schenk
- Championships: 1 Polish League; 4 Polish Cups; 2 Polish Supercups
- Website: Official Website
Home	Away

Trefl Sopot, officially Energa Trefl Sopot for sponsorship reasons, is a Polish professional basketball team, based in Sopot, Poland. The team plays in the Polish Basketball League and EuroCup. The club was founded as the replacement of Prokom Asseco Sopot that left the city of Sopot for Gdynia in 2009.

== History ==
The team was founded as a phoenix club with a new corporate identity after Asseco Prokom Sopot decided to relocate to Gdynia. In its inaugural season, the club played in the Hali 100-lecia. At the beginning of the 2010–11 season, Trefl moved to the Ergo Arena, with a capacity of 15,000 people the largest arena in the PLK. In the 2011–12 season, Sopot reached the PLK Finals where the team faced its predecessor Asseco Prokom Gdynia. In a thrilling best-of-seven series, Sopot lost 4–3.

In 2011–12, Sopot won its first trophy when it won the Polish Cup. In the following season, Sopot repeated as Cup champions. Alongside these victories, the team also won the Polish Supercup in 2012 and 2013.

In the 2020–21 PLK season, Sopot finished 5th overall, a result that exceeded expectations.

== Trophies ==
- Polish League (1):
  - Winners (1): 2023–24
  - Runners-up (1): 2011–12
  - Third place (1): 2013–14
- Polish Cups (3):
  - Winners (4): 2011–12, 2012–13, 2022–23, 2025–26
- Polish Supercups (2):
  - Winners (2): 2012, 2013
  - Runners-up (2): 2023, 2025

== Season by season ==
The Trefl Sopot club logo used from 2009 to 2015

Season	Tier	League	Pos.	Polish Cup	European competitions	
2009–10	1	PLK	4th			
2010–11	1	PLK	3rd		3 EuroChallenge	QR
2011–12	1	PLK	2nd	Winner		
2012–13	1	PLK	5th	Winner	2 Eurocup	RS
2013–14	1	PLK	3rd			
2014–15	1	PLK	8th			
2015–16	1	PLK	15th			
2016–17	1	PLK	9th			
2017–18	1	PLK	10th			
2018–19	1	PLK	15th			
2019–20	1	PLK	6th	Quarterfinalist		
2020–21	1	PLK	5th	Semifinalist		
2021–22	1	PLK	10th			
2022–23	1	PLK	8th	Champions	R ENBL	RS
2023–24	1	PLK	1st	Semifinalist		
2024–25	1	PLK	3rd	Quarterfinalist	2 Eurocup	RS
2025–26	1	PLK	4th	Champions	4 Europe Cup	2R

== Players ==
=== Current roster ===
Note: Flags indicate national team eligibility at FIBA-sanctioned events. Players may hold other non-FIBA nationalities not displayed.

Energa Trefl Sopot roster
Players
Coaches

Pos.	No.	Nat.	Name
G/F	1	(United States)	Anderson, Trey	2.01 m (6 ft 7 in)	23 – 26 August 2003
G	2	(United States)	Jacobs, Malique	1.91 m (6 ft 3 in)	26 – 28 April 2000
SF	3	(Poland)	Kiejzik, Szymon	1.93 m (6 ft 4 in)	20 – 28 February 2006
PG	5	(Poland)	Łącz, Filip	1.87 m (6 ft 2 in)	19 – 5 February 2007
SF	7	(Poland)	Nowicki, Szymon	2.01 m (6 ft 7 in)	21 – 2 June 2005
SG	9	(Poland)	Marchewka, Kacper	1.93 m (6 ft 4 in)	24 – 24 July 2002
C	12	(Bosnia and Herzegovina)	Simanić, Stefan	2.08 m (6 ft 10 in)	25 – 2 August 2001
PF	14	(Poland)	Wardziński, Antoni	2.00 m (6 ft 7 in)	18 – 25 October 2008
F	15	(Poland)	Twigg, David	2.00 m (6 ft 7 in)	18 – 8 April 2008
C	17	(Poland)	Syrzycki, Fabian	2.03 m (6 ft 8 in)	17 – 18 April 2009
G	20	(Finland)	Blomgren, Perttu	1.95 m (6 ft 5 in)	25 – 13 September 2001
C	21	(Poland)	Zapała, Szymon	2.13 m (7 ft 0 in)	25 – 9 May 2001
SG	23	(Poland)	Michalak, Michał	1.97 m (6 ft 6 in)	33 – 2 November 1993
PF	24	(Poland)	Prochorowicz, Karol	2.03 m (6 ft 8 in)	19 – 4 June 2007
SG	33	(Poland)	Rotegard, Tobias	2.01 m (6 ft 7 in)	26 – 8 May 2000
F	52	(United States)	Gilmore, Carter	2.01 m (6 ft 7 in)	24 – 12 December 2001
PG	55	(Poland)	Schenk, Jakub (C)	1.84 m (6 ft 0 in)	32 – 29 July 1994

Head coach

- (Poland) Krzysztof Roszyk

Assistant coach(es)

- (Poland) Radosław Soja

Legend

- (C) Team captain
- Injured

- Roster
Updated: October 12, 2026

=== Notable players ===
Note: Flags indicate national team eligibility at FIBA-sanctioned events. Players may hold other non-FIBA nationalities not displayed.

Criteria

To appear in this section a player must have either:

- Set a club record or won an individual award while at the club
- Played at least one official international match for their national team at any time
- Played at least one official NBA match at any time.

- (United Kingdom) (United States) Tarik Phillip (2024)
- (Poland) Filip Dylewicz
- (Poland) Łukasz Kolenda
- (Poland) Łukasz Koszarek (2011–2012)
- (Poland) Adam Waczyński
- (Poland) Igor Miličić Jr.
- (Finland) Perttu Blomgren
- (Finland) Carl Lindbom
- (Latvia) Sandis Buškevics
- (Lithuania) Giedrius Gustas (2010–2011)
- (Lithuania) Gintaras Kadžiulis (2009–2010)
- (Lithuania) Tautvydas Lydeka (2014–2015)
- (Lithuania) Šarūnas Vasiliauskas (2013–2015)
- (Lithuania) Eimantas Bendžius (2014–2015)
- (South Sudan) (United States) Nuni Omot
- (United States) Vonteego Cummings
- (United States) Lorinza Harrington
- (United States) Lance Jeter (2013–2014)
- (United States) Garrett Nevels (2022–2023)
- (United States) John Turek (2012–2013)

== Head coaches ==
- (Latvia) Kārlis Muižnieks
- (Croatia) Žan Tabak
- (Lithuania) Darius Maskoliūnas
- (Finland) Jukka Toijala
- (Finland) Mikko Larkas
