= 2011 FIBA Under-19 World Championship =

International basketball competition

- Official logo of the FIBA Under-19 World Championship 2011

Tournament details
- Host country: Latvia
- Cities: Valmiera, Liepāja, Rīga
- Dates: 30 June – 10 July
- Teams: 16 (from 5 confederations)
- Venues: 3 (in 3 host cities)

Final positions
- Champions: Lithuania (1st title)

Tournament statistics
- MVP: (Lithuania) Jonas Valančiūnas
- Top scorer: (Lithuania) Valančiūnas (23.0)
- Top rebounds: (Lithuania) Valančiūnas (13.9)
- Top assists: (Lithuania) Čižauskas (5.6)
- PPG (Team): Lithuania (90.4)
- RPG (Team): United States (44.1)
- APG (Team): Lithuania (16.8)

Official website
- FIBA Under-19 World Championship 2011

The 2011 FIBA Under-19 World Championship (Latvian: 2011. gada FIBA pasaules čempionāts līdz 19 gadu vecumam) was the 10th edition of the FIBA U19 World Championship, the biennial international men's youth basketball championship contested by the U19 national teams of the member associations of FIBA.

It was hosted by Latvia from 30 June to 10 July 2011. The draw for the tournament took place on 17 February 2011 in Riga. Teams played a round robin schedule, with the top three teams advancing to the knockout stage. Lithuania won their first title, and captain Jonas Valančiūnas was chosen the tournament MVP.

== Venues ==
Below is a list of the venues which were used to host games during the 2011 FIBA Under-19 World Championship. All games of a preliminary round group were held in a single arena, as well as the games in the knockout round.

Preliminary round		Knockout stage
Valmiera	Liepāja	Rīga
Vidzemes Olimpiskais Centrs	Liepājas Olimpiskais centrs	Arena Riga

== Draw ==
The draw held on February 17 divided the qualified teams into four groups named A, B, C, and D, as listed for the preliminary round. Aside from the fact that those teams in the same pot would not be in the same preliminary round groups, there were restrictions on how teams may be drawn. Before the draw was aware that Latvia will not be the same group with Lithuania, who will play in Liepāja. In addition to the FIBA wanted the first stage in each city to play over the three European teams, which meant that Russia should play a sample set of Valmiera groups.

Pot 1	Pot 2	Pot 3	Pot 4
United States; Australia; Russia; Lithuania	Croatia; Latvia; Poland; Serbia	Argentina; Brazil; Canada; China	South Korea; Egypt; Chinese Taipei; Tunisia

== Group stage ==
All times are local (UTC+3).

=== Group A ===
Team	Pld	W	L	PF	PA	PD	Pts	Tiebreaker
Poland	3	2	1	242	206	+36	5	1–1, +8
Brazil	3	2	1	254	207	+47	5	1–1, +6
Russia	3	2	1	252	220	+32	5	1–1, −14
Tunisia	3	0	3	168	283	−115	3	

30 June 2011
13:45

Boxscore

Poland	85–57	Tunisia
Scoring by quarter: 18–13, 28–14, 26–13, 13–17
Pts: Ponitka 17; Rebs: Bonarek 10; Asts: Grochowski 7		Pts: Mahmoud 10; Rebs: M'Rad 11; Asts: Souabni 5

Vidzemes Olimpiskais Centrs, Valmiera
Referees: Elias Koromnilas (GRE), Arnis Ozols (LAT), Zhiyuan Jiang (CHN)

30 June 2011
16:00

Boxscore

Russia	81–78	Brazil
Scoring by quarter: 27–21, 12–20, 23–18, 19–19
Pts: Karasev 24; Rebs: Karasev 6 Asts: Vikhrov 5		Pts: Togni Neto 20; Rebs: Nogueira 9 Asts: three players 2

Vidzemes Olimpiskais Centrs, Valmiera
Referees: Takao Udagwa (JPN), Joseph Bissang (FRA), Roberto Vasquez (PUR)

1 July 2011
13:45

Boxscore

Tunisia	55–101	Russia
Scoring by quarter: 16–21, 13–29, 14–23, 12–28
Pts: Abada 12; Rebs: Sadaddi, Manai 6 Asts: three players 2		Pts: Kulagin 18; Rebs: Trushkin 7 Asts: Varnakov, Zaryazhko 4

Vidzemes Olimpiskais Centrs, Valmiera
Referees: John Daniel Goble (USA), Fernando Rocha (POR), Zhiyuan Jiang (CHN)

1 July 2011
18:15

Boxscore

Brazil	79–70	Poland
Scoring by quarter: 18–22, 23–10, 9–20, 29–18
Pts: Togni Neto 16; Rebs: Felicio 7 Asts: Togni Neto 5		Pts: Michalak 14; Rebs: Ponitka, Niedzwiedzki 7 Asts: Grochowski 4

Vidzemes Olimpiskais Centrs, Valmiera
Referees: Vicente Bulto (ESP), Michael John Weiland (CAN), Arnis Ozols (LAT)

2 July 2011
13:45

Boxscore

Poland	87–70	Russia
Scoring by quarter: 18–17, 26–27, 26–14, 17–12
Pts: Karnowski 23; Rebs: Michalak 8 Asts: Grochowski 7		Pts: Karasev 14; Rebs: Tikhonin 7 Asts: Vikhrov 5

Vidzemes Olimpiskais Centrs, Valmiera
Referees: Milivoje Jovcic (SRB), Joseph Bissang (FRA), Zhiyuan Jiang (CHN)

2 July 2011
18:15

Boxscore

Brazil	97–56	Tunisia
Scoring by quarter: 23–9, 18–17, 26–20, 30–10
Pts: Nogueira 19; Rebs: Nogueira 10; Asts: Cunha 6		Pts: Souabni 18; Rebs: Saddadi, M'Rad 5 Asts: Roudesli 3

Vidzemes Olimpiskais Centrs, Valmiera
Referees: John Daniel Goble (USA), Elias Koromilas (GRE), Naftal Candido Chongo (MOZ)

=== Group B ===
Team	Pld	W	L	PF	PA	PD	Pts	Tiebreaker
Australia	3	2	1	234	192	+42	5	1–1, +14
Latvia	3	2	1	225	204	+21	5	1–1, +3
Argentina	3	2	1	198	204	−6	5	1–1, −17
Chinese Taipei	3	0	3	201	258	−57	3	

30 June 2011
18:15

Boxscore

Argentina	49–73	Australia
Scoring by quarter: 10–17, 10–15, 11–12, 18–29
Pts: Massarelli 16; Rebs: Delia 11; Asts: Paredes 7		Pts: Drmic 25; Rebs: Creek 7 Asts: Greenwood, Trist 5

Vidzemes Olimpiskais Centrs, Valmiera
Referees: Vicente Bulto (ESP), Milivoje Jovcic (SRB), Fernando Rocha (POR)

30 June 2011
20:30

Boxscore

Latvia	85–67	Chinese Taipei
Scoring by quarter: 25–20, 17–13, 24–14, 19–20
Pts: Timma 23; Rebs: Timma 14; Asts: Vecvagars 6		Pts: Hu 18; Rebs: Chen, Hu 4 Asts: Chien, Chen 3

Vidzemes Olimpiskais Centrs, Valmiera
Referees: John Daniel Goble (USA), Michael John Weiland (CAN), Naftal Candido Chongo (MOZ)

1 July 2011
16:00

Boxscore

Chinese Taipei	69–80	Argentina
Scoring by quarter: 16–17, 15–21, 10–29, 28–13
Pts: Hung 18; Rebs: Chen 6 Asts: Chen 3		Pts: Paredes 19; Rebs: four players 5 Asts: Giaveno 6

Vidzemes Olimpiskais Centrs, Valmiera
Referees: Joseph Bissang (FRA), Milivoje Jovcic (SRB), Naftal Candido Chongo (MOZ)

1 July 2011
20:30

Boxscore

Australia	68–78	Latvia
Scoring by quarter: 15–18, 17–17, 17–29, 19–14
Pts: Creek 20; Rebs: three players 5 Asts: Creek 4		Pts: Vecvagars 24; Rebs: Dukulis 7 Asts: Vecvagars 6

Vidzemes Olimpiskais Centrs, Valmiera
Referees: Takao Udagwa (JPN), Elias Koromilas (GRE), Roberto Vazquez (PUR)

2 July 2011
16:00

Boxscore

Chinese Taipei	65–93	Australia
Scoring by quarter: 17–29, 17–20, 16–30, 15–14
Pts: Hung 22; Rebs: Fan 5 Asts: Chen 3		Pts: Drmic 34; Rebs: Drmic 8 Asts: Aldridge, Hadziomerovic 4

Vidzemes Olimpiskais Centrs, Valmiera
Referees: Arnis Ozols (LAT), Takao Udagawa (JPN), Roberto Vasquez (PUR)

2 July 2011
20:30

Boxscore

Argentina	69–62	Latvia
Scoring by quarter: 18–9, 14–9, 17–22, 20–22
Pts: Massarelli 15; Rebs: Delia 12; Asts: Giaveno 5		Pts: Vecvagars 17; Rebs: Dukulis 9 Asts: Vecvagars 3

Vidzemes Olimpiskais Centrs, Valmiera
Referees: Vicente Bulto (ESP), Michael John Weiland (CAN), Fernando Rocha (POR)

=== Group C ===
Team	Pld	W	L	PF	PA	PD	Pts	Tiebreaker
Croatia	3	2	1	247	234	+13	5	1–0
Lithuania	3	2	1	303	220	+83	5	0–1
Canada	3	1	2	261	292	−31	4	1–0
South Korea	3	1	2	232	297	−65	4	0–1

30 June 2011
18:15

Boxscore

South Korea	93–109	Canada
Scoring by quarter: 22–28, 29–27, 25–27, 17–27
Pts: Lee 25; Rebs: Lee 6 Asts: Kim 8		Pts: Bhullar 24; Rebs: Bhullar 14; Asts: Pangos, Scrubb 3

Liepājas Olimpiskais centrs, Liepāja
Referees: Guerrino Cerebuch (ITA), Robert Lottermoser (GER), Yi-Chih Chung (TPE)

30 June 2011
20:30

Boxscore

Croatia	88–75	Lithuania
Scoring by quarter: 22–18, 20–13, 26–22, 20–22
Pts: Katić 23; Rebs: Šarić 11; Asts: Katić, Šarić 4		Pts: Valančiūnas 19; Rebs: Valančiūnas 13; Asts: Butkevičius 3

Liepājas Olimpiskais centrs, Liepāja
Referees: Fernando Jorge Sampietro (ARG), Guilherme Locatelli (BRA), Alejandro Sanchez (URU)

1 July 2011
18:15

Boxscore

Lithuania	117–64	South Korea
Scoring by quarter: 33–11, 30–21, 31–12, 23–20
Pts: Valančiūnas 25; Rebs: Valančiūnas 17; Asts: Simanavičius, Čižauskas 7		Pts: Kim 13; Rebs: Kim 5 Asts: Kim 5

Liepājas Olimpiskais centrs, Liepāja
Referees: Robert Lottermoser (GER), Samir Abaakil (MAR), Marwan Egho (LIB)

1 July 2011
20:30

Boxscore

Canada	84–88	Croatia
Scoring by quarter: 21–26, 22–18, 20–18, 21–26
Pts: Pangos 19; Rebs: Pierre 11; Asts: Pangos 5		Pts: Hezonja 21; Rebs: Barać 16; Asts: three players 4

Liepājas Olimpiskais centrs, Liepāja
Referees: Borys Ryzhyk (UKR), Philip Haines (AUS), Olegs Latisevs (LAT)

2 July 2011
16:00

Boxscore

Croatia	71–75	South Korea
Scoring by quarter: 21–19, 11–24, 19–14, 20–18
Pts: Barać 21; Rebs: Krstanović 16; Asts: Junaković, Zadravec 4		Pts: Kim, Kim 19; Rebs: Kim, Kim 8 Asts: Kim 6

Liepājas Olimpiskais centrs, Liepāja
Referees: Sergey Mikhaylov (RUS), Fernando Jorge Sampietro (ARG), Marwan Egho (LIB)

2 July 2011
20:30

Boxscore

Canada	68–111	Lithuania
Scoring by quarter: 13–29, 15–32, 22–23, 18–27
Pts: Pierre 10; Rebs: Pierre 9 Asts: Hanlan, Pangos 2		Pts: Čižauskas 22; Rebs: Valančiūnas 9 Asts: Čižauskas 5

Liepājas Olimpiskais centrs, Liepāja
Referees: Guerrino Cerebuch (ITA), Alejandro Sanchez (URU), Guilherme Locatelli (BRA)

=== Group D ===
Team	Pld	W	L	PF	PA	PD	Pts
United States	3	3	0	277	204	+73	6
Serbia	3	2	1	241	220	+21	5
Egypt	3	1	2	227	296	−69	4
China	3	0	3	235	260	−25	3

30 June 2011
13:45

Boxscore

China	73–78	Serbia
Scoring by quarter: 16–14, 19–22, 14–18, 24–24
Pts: Guo 21; Rebs: Zhai 7 Asts: Guo 4		Pts: Cvetković 20; Rebs: Silađi 10; Asts: Cvetković 6

Liepājas Olimpiskais centrs, Liepāja
Referees: Philip Haines (AUS), Olegs Latisevs (LAT), Sergey Mikhaylov (RUS)

30 June 2011
16:00

Boxscore

United States	115–60	Egypt
Scoring by quarter: 25–5, 25–24, 32–15, 33–16
Pts: McDermott 19; Rebs: Leonard 11; Asts: Brown 7		Pts: Mohamed 17; Rebs: Ahmed 9 Asts: Mostafa 3

Liepājas Olimpiskais centrs, Liepāja
Referees: Borys Ryzhyk (UKR), Samir Abbakil (MAR), Marwan Egho (LIB)

1 July 2011
13:45

Boxscore

Egypt	100–96 (OT)	China
Scoring by quarter: 16–10, 18–15, 22–18, 20–33, Overtime: 11–11, 13–9
Pts: Ahmed 25; Rebs: Ahmed 16; Asts: Hossam 10		Pts: Zhai 28; Rebs: Wang 10; Asts: Wang 7

Liepājas Olimpiskais centrs, Liepāja
Referees: Sergey Mikhaylov (RUS), Guilherme Locatelli (BRA), Alejandro Sanchez (URU)

1 July 2011
16:00

Boxscore

Serbia	78–80	United States
Scoring by quarter: 17–21, 14–17, 22–19, 25–23
Pts: Cvetković 20; Rebs: Mitrović 9 Asts: Cvetković 2		Pts: Jackson 19; Rebs: Mitchell 9 Asts: Hardaway 4

Liepājas Olimpiskais centrs, Liepāja
Referees: Guerrino Cerebuch (ITA), Fernando Jorge Sampietro (ARG), Yi-Chih Chung (TPE)

2 July 2011
13:45

Boxscore

Serbia	85–67	Egypt
Scoring by quarter: 25–17, 20–18, 19–18, 21–14
Pts: Cvetković 24; Rebs: Gujaničić 14; Asts: Vujošević, Lambić 5		Pts: Ahmed 20; Rebs: Ahmed 11; Asts: Hossam 5

Liepājas Olimpiskais centrs, Liepāja
Referees: Borys Ryzhyk (UKR), Yi-Chih Chung (TPE), Robert Lottermoser (GER)

2 July 2011
18:15

Boxscore

United States	82–66	China
Scoring by quarter: 25–13, 19–15, 12–25, 26–13
Pts: Lamb 17; Rebs: four players 8 Asts: Jackson 5		Pts: Ju 17; Rebs: Zhai 7 Asts: Wang Zh., Wang Zi. 2

Liepājas Olimpiskais centrs, Liepāja
Referees: Philip Lawrence Poulton Haines (AUS), Samir Abaakil (MAR), Olegs Latisevs (LAT)

== Eighth-final round ==
=== Group E ===
Team	Pld	W	L	PF	PA	PD	Pts	Tiebreaker
Australia	6	5	1	454	379	+75	11	
Poland	6	4	2	453	427	+26	10	1–0
Argentina	6	4	2	413	416	−3	10	0–1
Russia	6	3	3	473	441	+32	9	1–0
Brazil	6	3	3	468	414	+54	9	0–1
Latvia	6	2	4	439	451	−12	8	

4 July 2011
16:45

Boxscore

Australia	85–78	Russia
Scoring by quarter: 18–21, 19–18, 21–22, 27–17
Pts: Drmic 22; Rebs: Creek 7 Asts: Drmic 3		Pts: Karasev, Kulagin 19; Rebs: Trushkin 7 Asts: Loginov 5

Arena Riga, Riga
Referees: Guerrino Cerebuch (ITA), Milivoje Jovcic (SRB), Yi-Chih Chung (TPE)

4 July 2011
19:00

Boxscore

Latvia	73–88	Brazil
Scoring by quarter: 18–17, 16–29, 24–26, 15–16
Pts: Dukulis 22; Rebs: Dukulis 9 Asts: Vecvagars 4		Pts: Togni Neto 19; Rebs: Felicio 10; Asts: three players 3

Arena Riga, Riga
Referees: John Daniel Goble (USA), Elias Koromilas (GRE), Joseph Bissang (FRA)

4 July 2011
21:15

Boxscore

Argentina	71–73	Poland
Scoring by quarter: 11–20, 8–13, 27–17, 25–23
Pts: Paredes 17; Rebs: Massarelli, Perez 6 Asts: Massarelli, Giaveno 5		Pts: Ponitka 20; Rebs: Karnowski 9 Asts: Michalak 4

Arena Riga, Riga
Referees: Michael John Weiland (CAN), Robert Lottermoser (GER), Samir Abaakil (MAR)

5 July 2011
16:45

Boxscore

Brazil	57–63	Australia
Scoring by quarter: 12–12, 16–16, 14–17, 15–18
Pts: Togni Neto 19; Rebs: Nogueira 16; Asts: Cunha, Togni Neto 2		Pts: Creek 23; Rebs: Creek 10; Asts: Drmic, Hadziomerovic 2

Arena Riga, Riga
Referees: Vicente Bulto (ESP), Borys Ryzhyk (UKR), Zhiyuan Jiang (CHN)

5 July 2011
19:00

Boxscore

Poland	86–78	Latvia
Scoring by quarter: 27–13, 25–14, 12–16, 22–35
Pts: Ponitka 26; Rebs: three players 8 Asts: Grzelinski 4		Pts: Vecvagars 21; Rebs: Bertāns 11; Asts: Vecvagars, Dukulis 3

Arena Riga, Riga
Referees: Guerrino Cerebuch (ITA), Milivoje Jovcic (SRB), Yi-Chih Chung (TPE)

5 July 2011
21:15

Boxscore

Russia	70–73	Argentina
Scoring by quarter: 12–16, 14–23, 25–15, 19–19
Pts: Karasev 25; Rebs: Karasev 8 Asts: Karasev, Varnakov 3		Pts: Garino 19; Rebs: Delia 8 Asts: Delia 3

Arena Riga, Riga
Referees: Takao Udagawa (JPN), John Daniel Goble (USA), Elias Koromilas (GRE)

6 July 2011
16:45

Boxscore

Australia	72–52	Poland
Scoring by quarter: 12–14, 17–13, 24–6, 19–19
Pts: Aldridge 21; Rebs: three players 8 Asts: Greenwood 3		Pts: Niedzwiedzki 11; Rebs: Karnowski 7 Asts: Grzelinski 3

Arena Riga, Riga
Referees: John Daniel Goble (USA), Milivoje Jovcic (SRB), Alejandro Sanchez (URU)

6 July 2011
19:00

Boxscore

Latvia	63–73	Russia
Scoring by quarter: 21–15, 11–12, 17–16, 14–30
Pts: Vecvagars 17; Rebs: Dukulis 12; Asts: Bertāns 5		Pts: Varnakov 21; Rebs: Zaryazhko 7 Asts: four players 2

Arena Riga, Riga
Referees: Michael John Weiland (CAN), Robert Lottermoser (GER), Roberto Vazquez (PUR)

6 July 2011
21:15

Boxscore

Argentina	71–69 (OT)	Brazil
Scoring by quarter: 8–19, 16–11, 18–13, 20–19, Overtime: 9–7
Pts: Massarelli 15; Rebs: Delia 8 Asts: Copello 4		Pts: Taddei 15; Rebs: Nogueira 13; Asts: Togni Neto 8

Arena Riga, Riga
Referees: Guerrino Cerebuch (ITA), Borys Ryzhyk (UKR), Yi-Chih Chung (TPE)

=== Group F ===
Team	Pld	W	L	PF	PA	PD	Pts	Tiebreaker
United States	6	5	1	552	450	+102	11	
Croatia	6	4	2	485	473	+12	10	1–1, +8
Lithuania	6	4	2	557	440	+117	10	1–1, +4
Serbia	6	4	2	462	432	+30	10	1–1, −12
Canada	6	2	4	481	540	−41	8	
Egypt	6	1	5	438	548	−110	7	

4 July 2011
10:00

Boxscore

Egypt	81–83	Croatia
Scoring by quarter: 22–25, 20–22, 24–19, 15–17
Pts: Mohamed, Ahmed 22; Rebs: Samir 7 Asts: Ahmed 4		Pts: Šarić 19; Rebs: Šarić 16; Asts: Katić, Šarić 7

Arena Riga, Riga
Referees: Guilherme Locatelli (BRA), Olegs Latisevs (LAT), Zhiyuan Jiang (CHN)

4 July 2011
12:15

Boxscore

Serbia	54–71	Lithuania
Scoring by quarter: 8–19, 13–14, 22–15, 11–23
Pts: Cvetković 15; Rebs: Lambić 12; Asts: Lambić 3		Pts: Valančiūnas 18; Rebs: Valančiūnas 13; Asts: Čižauskas 7

Arena Riga, Riga
Referees: Takao Udagawa (JPN), Vicente Bulto (ESP), Roberto Vazquez (PUR)

4 July 2011
14:30

Boxscore

United States	83–54	Canada
Scoring by quarter: 21–14, 25–9, 22–17, 15–14
Pts: Bell 16; Rebs: Mitchell 9 Asts: Carson 6		Pts: Bhullar 15; Rebs: Bhullar 7 Asts: Pangos 5

Arena Riga, Riga
Referees: Fernando Jorge Sampietro (ARG), Borys Ryzhyk (UKR), Fernando Rocha (POR)

5 July 2011
10:00

Boxscore

Canada	91–71	Egypt
Scoring by quarter: 25–14, 23–16, 27–14, 16–27
Pts: Pangos 22; Rebs: Shaver 8 Asts: Hanlan 8		Pts: Mohamed 16; Rebs: Mohamed 7 Asts: Ahmed 6

Arena Riga, Riga
Referees: Olegs Latisevs (LAT), Roberto Vazquez (PUR), Samir Abaakil (MAR)

5 July 2011
12:15

Boxscore

Croatia	68–73	Serbia
Scoring by quarter: 11–16, 20–15, 19–17, 18–25
Pts: Barać 18; Rebs: Šarić 8 Asts: Katić 5		Pts: Drenovac 19; Rebs: Gujaničić 9 Asts: five players 1

Arena Riga, Riga
Referees: Michael John Weiland (CAN), Guilherme Locatelli (BRA), Fernando Rocha (POR)

5 July 2011
14:30

Boxscore

Lithuania	105–107 (OT)	United States
Scoring by quarter: 15–25, 24–24, 21–20, 34–25, Overtime: 11–13
Pts: Valančiūnas 30; Rebs: Valančiūnas 15; Asts: Redikas 3		Pts: Lamb 35; Rebs: McDermott, Mitchell 8 Asts: Jackson 6

Arena Riga, Riga
Referees: Fernando Jorge Sampietro (ARG), Joseph Bissang (FRA), Robert Lottermoser (GER)

6 July 2011
10:00

Boxscore

Egypt	59–78	Lithuania
Scoring by quarter: 9–23, 16–23, 17–17, 17–15
Pts: Ahmed 23; Rebs: Ahmed 19; Asts: Ahmed 7		Pts: Valančiūnas 17; Rebs: Valančiūnas 13; Asts: Redikas 6

Arena Riga, Riga
Referees: Elias Koromilas (GRE), Fernando Rocha (POR), Zhiyuan Jiang (CHN)

6 July 2011
12:15

Boxscore

Serbia	94–73	Canada
Scoring by quarter: 23–14, 24–12, 25–20, 22–27
Pts: Drenovac 14; Rebs: Bogdanović, Gujaničić 7 Asts: Cvetković 6		Pts: Lomomba 14; Rebs: Shaver 8 Asts: Pangos, Hanlan 2

Arena Riga, Riga
Referees: Joseph Bissang (FRA), Fernando Jorge Sampietro (ARG), Guilherme Locatelli (BRA)

6 July 2011
14:30

Boxscore

United States	85–87	Croatia
Scoring by quarter: 24–25, 19–21, 18–24, 24–17
Pts: Lamb 25; Rebs: Young 8 Asts: Jackson 4		Pts: Katić 21; Rebs: Šarić 8 Asts: Katić 4

Arena Riga, Riga
Referees: Vicente Bulto (ESP), Takao Udagawa (JPN), Olegs Latisevs (LAT)

== Classification round ==
=== 13th–16th place ===
Semi-finals
4 July
South Korea	88
China	95
4 July
Tunisia	59
Chinese Taipei	70

Thirteenth place
5 July
China	91
Chinese Taipei	48
Fifteenth place
5 July
South Korea	78
Tunisia	72

==== Semifinals ====
4 July 2011
17:30

Boxscore

South Korea	88–95	China
Scoring by quarter: 11–24, 19–26, 20–25, 38–20
Pts: Kim 32; Rebs: Jun Yl Kim 5 Asts: Lee 7		Pts: Wang 21; Rebs: Sun 14; Asts: Sun 4

Liepājas Olimpiskais centrs, Liepāja
Referees: Arnis Ozols (LAT), Alejandro Sanchez (URU), Naftal Candido Chongo (MOZ)

4 July 2011
20:00

Boxscore

Tunisia	59–70	Chinese Taipei
Scoring by quarter: 21–15, 8–13, 14–15, 16–27
Pts: Souabni 16; Rebs: M'Rad 13; Asts: Roudesli, Mahmoud 2		Pts: Chen 24; Rebs: Chen 8 Asts: Chen 6

Liepājas Olimpiskais centrs, Liepāja
Referees: Philip Lawrence Poulton Haines (AUS), Sergey Mikhaylov (RUS), Marwan Egho (LIB)

==== Fifteenth place game ====
5 July 2011
17:30

Boxscore

South Korea	78–72	Tunisia
Scoring by quarter: 11–15, 17–25, 24–10, 26–22
Pts: Kim 20; Rebs: Kim 7 Asts: Kim 6		Pts: Abada 19; Rebs: Manai 10; Asts: Souabni 8

Liepājas Olimpiskais centrs, Liepāja
Referees: Philip Lawrence Poulton Hines (AUS), Alejandro Sanchez Varela R. (URU), Naftal Candido Ckongo (MOZ)

==== Thirteenth place game ====
5 July 2011
20:00

Boxscore

China	91–48	Chinese Taipei
Scoring by quarter: 13–15, 33–13, 24–6, 21–14
Pts: Guo 24; Rebs: Zhai 9 Asts: Guo 4		Pts: Hung 18; Rebs: Hung 6 Asts: Chen 5

Liepājas Olimpiskais centrs, Liepāja
Referees: Arnis Ozols (LAT), Marwan Egho (LIB), Sergey Mikhaylov (RUS)

=== 9th–12th place ===
Semi-finals
8 July
Brazil	77
Egypt	63
8 July
Canada	96
Latvia	99

Ninth place
9 July
Brazil	81
Latvia	73
Eleventh place
9 July
Egypt	79
Canada	84

==== Semifinals ====
8 July 2011
10:00

Boxscore

Brazil	77–63	Egypt
Scoring by quarter: 12–16, 28–15, 19–11, 18–21
Pts: Rossetto 18; Rebs: Cunha 6 Asts: Togni Neto 6		Pts: Mohamed 18; Rebs: Ahmed 13; Asts: Mohamed 3

Arena Riga, Riga
Referees: Milivoje Jovcic (SRB), Alejandro Sanchez Varela (URU), Yi-Chih Chung (TPE)

8 July 2011
12:15

Boxscore

Latvia	99–96	Canada
Scoring by quarter: 23–24, 21–30, 27–15, 28–27
Pts: Dukulis 23; Rebs: Dukulis 11; Asts: Vecvagars, Bertāns 4		Pts: Pierre 30; Rebs: Pierre 10; Asts: Hanlan 5

Arena Riga, Riga
Referees: Vicente Bulto (ESP), Takao Udagawa (JPN), Marwan Egho (LIB)

==== Eleventh place game ====
9 July 2011
10:00

Boxscore

Egypt	79–84	Canada
Scoring by quarter: 18–17, 16–21, 24–25, 21–21
Pts: Ahmed 19; Rebs: Ahmed 13; Asts: Gamal 4		Pts: Pierre 28; Rebs: Pierre 13; Asts: Pierre 4

Arena Riga, Riga
Referees: John Daniel Goble (USA), Yi-Chih Chung (TPE), Naftal Candido Chongo (MOZ)

==== Ninth place game ====
9 July 2011
12:15

Boxscore

Brazil	81–73	Latvia
Scoring by quarter: 21–14, 20–21, 17–19, 23–19
Pts: Rossetto 19; Rebs: Nogueira 10; Asts: Togni Neto 4		Pts: Bertāns 25; Rebs: Dukulis, Timma 6 Asts: Timma 6

Arena Riga, Riga
Referees: Fernando Jorge Sampietro (ARG), Milivoje Jovcic (SRB), Marwan Egho (LIB)

== Final round ==
=== Bracket ===
Quarter-finals
8 July
Australia	74
Serbia	93
8 July
Croatia	76
Argentina	81
8 July
United States	74
Russia	79
8 July
Poland	75
Lithuania	87

Semi-finals
9 July
Serbia	76
Argentina	71
9 July
Russia	68
Lithuania	85

Final
10 July
Serbia	67
Lithuania	85
Third place
10 July
Argentina	72
Russia	77

5th place bracket

Semi-finals
9 July
Australia	90
Croatia	63
9 July
United States	84
Poland	47

Fifth place
10 July
Australia	77
United States	78
Seventh place
10 July
Croatia	70
Poland	82

=== Quarterfinals ===
8 July 2011
14:30

Boxscore

Poland	75–87	Lithuania
Scoring by quarter: 15–22, 18–25, 24–17, 18–23
Pts: Michalak 29; Rebs: Michalak 13; Asts: Grochowski 6		Pts: Valančiūnas 26; Rebs: Valančiūnas 24; Asts: Cizauskas 6

Arena Riga, Riga
Referees: Fernando Jorge Sampietro (ARG), Philip Lawrence Poulton Haines (AUS), Samir Abaakil (MAR)

8 July 2011
16:45

Boxscore

Russia	79–74	United States
Scoring by quarter: 25–18, 15–12, 12–23, 27–21
Pts: Kulagin 21; Rebs: Kulagin 12; Asts: Gudumak 5		Pts: Lamb 21; Rebs: Mitchell 7 Asts: four players 2

Arena Riga, Riga
Referees: Elias Koromilas (GRE), Robert Lottermoser (GER), Naftal Candido Chongo (MOZ)

8 July 2011
19:00

Boxscore

Australia	74–93	Serbia
Scoring by quarter: 12–22, 26–20, 10–27, 26–24
Pts: Greenwood 25; Rebs: Creek 6 Asts: three players 2		Pts: Mitrović, Drenovac 17; Rebs: Gujaničić 7 Asts: Cvetković 4

Arena Riga, Riga
Referees: John Daniel Goble (USA), Olegs Latisevs (LAT), Joseph Bissang (FRA)

8 July 2011
21:15

Boxscore

Argentina	81–76	Croatia
Scoring by quarter: 21–11, 25–21, 13–22, 22–22
Pts: Garino 21; Rebs: Garino 8 Asts: Giaveno 5		Pts: Šarić 24; Rebs: Šarić 9 Asts: Šarić, Katić 3

Arena Riga, Riga
Referees: Guerrino Cerebuch (ITA), Roberto Vazquez (PUR), Sergey Mikhaylov (RUS)

=== Classification 5–8 ===
9 July 2011
14:30

Boxscore

United States	84–47	Poland
Scoring by quarter: 19–11, 17–10, 23–11, 25–15
Pts: McDermott 19; Rebs: Jackson 10; Asts: Lamb, Jackson 4		Pts: Michalak 13; Rebs: Michalak, Grochowski 5 Asts: Grochowski 5

Arena Riga, Riga
Referees: Guerrino Cerebuch (ITA), Sergey Mikhaylov (RUS), Alejandro SANCHEZ Varela (URU)

9 July 2011
16:45

Boxscore

Australia	90–63	Croatia
Scoring by quarter: 24–19, 16–16, 22–16, 28–12
Pts: Greenwood 21; Rebs: Creek 10; Asts: Creek 6		Pts: Barać 20; Rebs: Šarić 7 Asts: Junaković 6

Arena Riga, Riga
Referees: Vicente Bulto (ESP), Fernando Rocha (POR), Zhiyuan Jiang (CHN)

=== Semifinals ===
9 July 2011
19:00

Boxscore

Russia	68–85	Lithuania
Scoring by quarter: 11–25, 15–28, 24–17, 15–18
Pts: Kulagin 27; Rebs: Trushkin 5 Asts: Zaryazhko 4		Pts: Valančiūnas 21; Rebs: Valančiūnas 13; Asts: Čižauskas 7

Arena Riga, Riga
Referees: Elias Koromilas (GRE), Roberto Vazquez (PUR), Philip Lawrence Poulton Haines (AUS)

9 July 2011
21:15

Boxscore

Serbia	76–71	Argentina
Scoring by quarter: 16–14, 12–18, 29–22, 19–17
Pts: Bogdanović 25; Rebs: Bogdanović 8 Asts: Vujošević 6		Pts: Delia 19; Rebs: Delia 10; Asts: Giaveno 3

Arena Riga, Riga
Referees: Michael John Weiland (CAN), Olegs Latisevs (LAT), Borys Ryzhyk (UKR)

=== Seventh place game ===
10 July 2011
13:30

Boxscore

Poland	82–70	Croatia
Scoring by quarter: 18–26, 20–20, 22–11, 22–13
Pts: Karnowski 29; Rebs: Karnowski 9 Asts: Grochowski 7		Pts: Šarić 21; Rebs: Šarić 9 Asts: three players 3

Arena Riga, Riga
Referees: Fernando Jorge Sampietro (ARG), Sergey Mikhaylov (RUS), Philip Lawrence Poulton Haines (AUS)

=== Fifth place game ===
10 July 2011
15:45

Boxscore

United States	78–77	Australia
Scoring by quarter: 21–24, 18–19, 21–16, 18–18
Pts: Hardaway 21; Rebs: Leonard 6 Asts: Jackson 7		Pts: Greenwood 26; Rebs: Creek 9 Asts: Greenwood 5

Arena Riga, Riga
Referees: Vicente Bulto (ESP), Borys Ryzhyk (UKR), Yi-Chih Chung (TPE)

=== Bronze medal game ===
10 July 2011
19:00

Boxscore

Argentina	72–77	Russia
Scoring by quarter: 19–19, 21–16, 13–15, 19–27
Pts: Girogetti 18; Rebs: Delia 7 Asts: Giaveno 5		Pts: Kulagin 24; Rebs: Kulagin 8 Asts: Kulagin 4

Arena Riga, Riga
Referees: Milivoje Jovcic (SRB), Robert Lottermoser (GER), Alejandro Sanchez Varela (URU)

=== Final ===
10 July 2011
21:15

Boxscore

Serbia	67–85	Lithuania
Scoring by quarter: 13–18, 19–21, 15–23, 20–23
Pts: Drenovac 14; Rebs: Cvetković, Silađi 5 Asts: Bogdanović 3		Pts: Valančiūnas 36; Rebs: Valančiūnas 8 Asts: Čižauskas 6

Arena Riga, Riga
Referees: Guerrino Cerebuch (ITA), John Daniel Goble (USA), Takao Udagawa (JPN)

== Final standings ==
Rank	Team
1st place, gold medalist(s)	Lithuania
2nd place, silver medalist(s)	Serbia
3rd place, bronze medalist(s)	Russia
4th	Argentina
5th	United States
6th	Australia
7th	Poland
8th	Croatia
9th	Brazil
10th	Latvia
11th	Canada
12th	Egypt
13th	China
14th	Chinese Taipei
15th	South Korea
16th	Tunisia

== Statistical leaders ==
Points

Name	PPG
(Lithuania) Jonas Valančiūnas	23.0
(Croatia) Boris Barać	18.7
(Egypt) Assem Marei	18.5
(Croatia) Dario Šarić	18.1
(Poland) Michal Michalak	17.4

Rebounds

Name	RPG
(Lithuania) Jonas Valančiūnas	13.9
(Egypt) Assem Marei	12.2
(Croatia) Dario Šarić	10.1
(Latvia) Edmunds Dukulis	9.5
(Brazil) Lucas Nogueira	8.8

Assists

Name	APG
(Lithuania) Vytenis Čižauskas	5.6
(Poland) Grzegorz Grochowski	5.5
(South Korea) Kim Gi-yun	5.4
(Croatia) Toni Katić	4.5
(United States) Joe Jackson (Brazil) Raulzinho Togni Neto	4.1

Blocks

Name	BPG
(Lithuania) Jonas Valančiūnas	3.2
(Brazil) Lucas Nogueira	2.9
(United States) Tony Mitchell	1.8
(Poland) Przemyslaw Karnowski (United States) Meyers Leonard	1.6

Steals

Name	SPG
(Egypt) Assem Marei	2.3
(Chinese Taipei) Chen Ying-chun (South Korea) Moon Seong-gon	2.2
(Canada) Kevin Pangos	2.1
(United States) Jeremy Lamb	2.0

== Awards ==
2011 Under-19 World Championship winner

Lithuania
First title

Most Valuable Player
(Lithuania) Jonas Valančiūnas

All-Tournament Team

- (Serbia) Aleksandar Cvetković
- (Australia) Hugh Greenwood
- (United States) Jeremy Lamb
- (Russia) Dmitry Kulagin
- (Lithuania) Jonas Valančiūnas

== Referees ==
FIBA named 26 referees that officiated at the tournament.

- (Argentina) Fernando Jorge Samprieto
- (Australia) Philip Lawrence Poulton Haines
- (Brazil) Guilherme Locatelli
- (Canada) Michael John Weiland
- (China) Zhiyuan Jiang
- (Chinese Taipei) Yi-Chih Chung
- (Colombia) Jose Hernan Melgarejo Pinto
- (France) Joseph Bissang
- (Germany) Robert Lottermoser
- (Greece) Elias Koromilas
- (Italy) Guerrino Cerebuch
- (Japan) Takao Udagawa
- (Latvia) Olegs Latisevs
- (Latvia) Arnis Ozols
- (Lebanon) Marwan Egho
- (Morocco) Samir Abaakil
- (Mozambique) Naftal Candido Chongo
- (Portugal) Fernando Rocha
- (Puerto Rico) Roberto Vazquez
- (Russia) Sergey Mikhaylov
- (Serbia) Milivoje Jovcic
- (Slovenia) Damir Javor
- (Spain) Vicente Bulto
- (Ukraine) Borys Ryzhyk
- (Uruguay) Alejandro Sanchez Varela
- (United States) John Daniel Goble
