= EuroBasket 2015 squads =

This article displays the squads of the teams that competed in EuroBasket 2015. Each team includes of 12 players.

Age and club as of the start of the tournament, 5 September 2015.

== Group A ==
=== Bosnia and Herzegovina ===
Bosnia and Herzegovina men's national basketball team roster
Players
Coaches

Pos.	No.	Name	Age – Date of birth	Height	Club	Ctr.
PG	4	Muhamed Pašalić	27 – 27 September 1987	1.94 m (6 ft 4 in)	Cluj-Napoca	(Romania)
SF	5	Nedim Buza	20 – 10 May 1995	2.02 m (6 ft 8 in)	Telenet Oostende	(Belgium)
C	6	Andrija Stipanović	28 – 18 December 1986	2.08 m (6 ft 10 in)	Trabzonspor	(Turkey)
SG	7	Marko Šutalo	32 – 13 April 1983	1.93 m (6 ft 4 in)	Pitești	(Romania)
PF	9	Edin Bavčić	31 – 5 June 1984	2.05 m (6 ft 9 in)	Sigal Prishtina	(Kosovo)
PG	10	Nemanja Gordić	26 – 25 September 1988	1.94 m (6 ft 4 in)	Cedevita	(Croatia)
C	11	Elmedin Kikanović (C)	27 – 2 September 1988	2.08 m (6 ft 10 in)	Alba Berlin	(Germany)
SG	13	Dalibor Peršić	30 – 28 May 1985	1.97 m (6 ft 6 in)	Timișoara	(Romania)
SF	15	Milan Milošević	29 – 26 October 1985	2.02 m (6 ft 8 in)	AEK	(Greece)
PG	20	Alex Renfroe	29 – 23 May 1986	1.95 m (6 ft 5 in)	Bayern Munich	(Germany)
SF	23	Adin Vrabac	21 – 27 January 1994	2.05 m (6 ft 9 in)	Trier	(Germany)
PF	30	Draško Albijanić	28 – 14 December 1986	2.08 m (6 ft 10 in)	Sutjeska	(Montenegro)

Head coach

- (Montenegro) Duško Ivanović

Assistant coach(es)

- (Bosnia and Herzegovina) Alen Abaz
- (Serbia) Mrđa Milkan
- (Serbia) Nenad Trajković

Legend

- (C) Team captain
- Club – describes last
  club before the tournament
- Age – describes age
  on 5 September 2015

=== Finland ===
Finland men's national basketball team roster
Players
Coaches

Pos.	No.	Name	Age – Date of birth	Height	Club	Ctr.
SG	4	Mikko Koivisto	28 – 18 April 1987	1.94 m (6 ft 4 in)	Nilan Bisons	(Finland)
SF	7	Shawn Huff (C)	31 – 5 May 1984	1.98 m (6 ft 6 in)	MHP Ludwigsburg	(Germany)
C	8	Gerald Lee	27 – 23 November 1987	2.08 m (6 ft 10 in)	CSA Steaua București	(Romania)
SG	9	Sasu Salin	24 – 11 June 1991	1.91 m (6 ft 3 in)	CB Gran Canaria	(Spain)
F/C	10	Tuukka Kotti	34 – 18 March 1981	2.05 m (6 ft 9 in)	Nilan Bisons	(Finland)
PG	11	Petteri Koponen	27 – 13 April 1988	1.94 m (6 ft 4 in)	BC Khimki	(Russia)
SF	12	Matti Nuutinen	25 – 6 May 1990	2.00 m (6 ft 7 in)	Arkadikos	(Greece)
PF	21	Ville Kaunisto	33 – 19 March 1982	2.04 m (6 ft 8 in)	Kouvot	(Finland)
PF	24	Joonas Cavén	22 – 12 January 1993	2.11 m (6 ft 11 in)	Delaware 87ers	(United States)
PG	30	Roope Ahonen	25 – 12 June 1990	1.87 m (6 ft 2 in)	Kolossos Rodou	(Greece)
PG	31	Jamar Wilson	31 – 22 February 1984	1.85 m (6 ft 1 in)	SPO Rouen Basket	(France)
PF	33	Erik Murphy	24 – 26 October 1990	2.08 m (6 ft 10 in)	Beşiktaş	(Turkey)

Head coach

- (Finland) Henrik Dettmann

Assistant coach(es)

- (Finland) Pekka Salminen
- (Finland) Jukka Toijala
- (Finland) Lassi Tuovi

Legend

- (C) Team captain
- Club – describes last
  club before the tournament
- Age – describes age
  on 5 September 2015

=== France ===
France men's national basketball team roster
Players
Coaches

Pos.	No.	Name	Age – Date of birth	Height	Club	Ctr.
PG	4	Léo Westermann	23 – 24 July 1992	1.97 m (6 ft 6 in)	Limoges CSP	(France)
SF	5	Nicolas Batum	26 – 14 December 1988	2.03 m (6 ft 8 in)	Charlotte Hornets	(United States)
F/C	7	Joffrey Lauvergne	23 – 30 September 1991	2.09 m (6 ft 10 in)	Denver Nuggets	(United States)
SF	8	Charles Lombahe-Kahudi	29 – 19 July 1986	1.99 m (6 ft 6 in)	ASVEL Basket	(France)
PG	9	Tony Parker	33 – 17 May 1982	1.88 m (6 ft 2 in)	San Antonio Spurs	(United States)
SG	10	Evan Fournier	22 – 29 October 1992	1.97 m (6 ft 6 in)	Orlando Magic	(United States)
PF	11	Florent Piétrus	34 – 19 January 1981	2.01 m (6 ft 7 in)	SLUC Nancy	(France)
G	12	Nando de Colo	28 – 23 June 1987	1.95 m (6 ft 5 in)	CSKA Moscow	(Russia)
PF	13	Boris Diaw (C)	33 – 16 April 1982	2.05 m (6 ft 9 in)	San Antonio Spurs	(United States)
SF	15	Mickaël Gelabale	32 – 22 May 1983	2.01 m (6 ft 7 in)	Le Mans Sarthe	(France)
C	16	Rudy Gobert	23 – 26 June 1992	2.13 m (7 ft 0 in)	Utah Jazz	(United States)
C	19	Mouhammadou Jaiteh	20 – 27 November 1994	2.08 m (6 ft 10 in)	JSF Nanterre	(France)

Head coach

- (France) Vincent Collet

Assistant coach(es)

- (France) Jacques Commères
- (France) Ruddy Nelhomme

Legend

- (C) Team captain
- Club – describes last
  club before the tournament
- Age – describes age
  on 5 September 2015

=== Israel ===
Israel men's national basketball team roster
Players
Coaches

Pos.	No.	Name	Age – Date of birth	Height	Club
SG	5	Dagan Yivzori	29 – 15 October 1985	1.93 m (6 ft 4 in)	Maccabi Tel Aviv	(Israel)
G/F	6	Shawn Dawson	21 – 12 December 1993	1.95 m (6 ft 5 in)	Maccabi Rishon LeZion	(Israel)
PG	7	Gal Mekel	27 – 4 March 1988	1.90 m (6 ft 3 in)	Crvena zvezda	(Serbia)
PF	8	Lior Eliyahu	29 – 9 September 1985	2.05 m (6 ft 9 in)	Hapoel Jerusalem	(Israel)
SF	9	Omri Casspi (C)	27 – 22 June 1988	2.06 m (6 ft 9 in)	Sacramento Kings	(United States)
SG	10	Raviv Limonad	31 – 26 August 1984	1.91 m (6 ft 3 in)	Hapoel Tel Aviv	(Israel)
PF	11	Elishay Kadir	27 – 4 November 1987	2.02 m (6 ft 8 in)	Hapoel Eilat	(Israel)
PG	12	Yogev Ohayon	28 – 24 April 1987	1.91 m (6 ft 3 in)	Maccabi Tel Aviv	(Israel)
C	14	Yaniv Green	35 – 16 May 1980	2.06 m (6 ft 9 in)	Hapoel Jerusalem	(Israel)
C	15	D'or Fischer	33 – 12 October 1981	2.11 m (6 ft 11 in)	Hapoel Jerusalem	(Israel)
C	16	Robert Rothbart	29 – 16 June 1986	2.17 m (7 ft 1 in)	Hapoel Tel Aviv	(Israel)
PG	23	Bar Timor	23 – 2 March 1992	1.91 m (6 ft 3 in)	Hapoel Jerusalem	(Israel)

Head coach

- (Israel) Erez Edelstein

Assistant coach(es)

- (Israel) Lior Lubin
- (Israel) Alon Stein

General Manager

- (Israel) Pini Gershon

Legend

- (C) Team captain
- Club – describes last
  club before the tournament
- Age – describes age
  on 5 September 2015

=== Poland ===
Poland men's national basketball team roster
Players
Coaches

Pos.	No.	Name	Age – Date of birth	Height	Club	Ctr.
PF	0	Aleksander Czyż	25 – 3 March 1990	2.04 m (6 ft 8 in)	Turow	(Poland)
PF	5	Aaron Cel	28 – 4 March 1987	2.03 m (6 ft 8 in)	AS Monaco	(France)
SG	6	A. J. Slaughter	28 – 3 August 1987	1.91 m (6 ft 3 in)	Banvit	(Turkey)
PF	7	Damian Kulig	28 – June 23, 1987	2.04 m (6 ft 8 in)	Trabzonspor	(Turkey)
SF	10	Mateusz Ponitka	22 – 29 August 1993	1.97 m (6 ft 6 in)	Zielona Góra	(Poland)
SF	12	Adam Waczyński	25 – 15 October 1989	1.98 m (6 ft 6 in)	Rio Natura Monbus	(Spain)
C	13	Marcin Gortat (C)	31 – February 17, 1984	2.11 m (6 ft 11 in)	Washington Wizards	(United States)
PG	15	Łukasz Koszarek	31 – 12 January 1984	1.87 m (6 ft 2 in)	Zielona Góra	(Poland)
SG	17	Przemysław Zamojski	28 – 16 December 1986	1.93 m (6 ft 4 in)	Zielona Góra	(Poland)
C	24	Przemysław Karnowski	21 – November 8, 1993	2.14 m (7 ft 0 in)	Gonzaga	(United States)
SG	33	Karol Gruszecki	25 – 4 November 1989	1.93 m (6 ft 4 in)	Zielona Góra	(Poland)
PG	66	Robert Skibniewski	32 – 19 July 1983	1.82 m (6 ft 0 in)	Anwil	(Poland)

Head coach

- (United States) Mike Taylor

Assistant coach(es)

- (Poland) Wojciech Kaminski
- (Poland) Pawel Turkiewicz

Legend

- (C) Team captain
- Club – describes last
  club before the tournament
- Age – describes age
  on 5 September 2015

=== Russia ===
Russia men's national basketball team roster
Players
Coaches

Pos.	No.	Name	Age – Date of birth	Height	Club	Ctr.
PF	1	Andrey Zubkov	24 – 29 June 1991	2.05 m (6 ft 9 in)	PBC Lokomotiv-Kuban	(Russia)
SG	4	Evgeny Baburin	28 – 4 July 1987	1.90 m (6 ft 3 in)	BC Nizhny Novgorod	(Russia)
C	5	Ruslan Pateev	25 – 25 April 1990	2.13 m (7 ft 0 in)	BC Khimki	(Russia)
G	7	Vitaly Fridzon	29 – 14 October 1985	1.95 m (6 ft 5 in)	PBC CSKA Moscow	(Russia)
SG	9	Egor Vyaltsev	29 – 10 October 1985	1.93 m (6 ft 4 in)	BC Khimki	(Russia)
F	11	Semyon Antonov	26 – 18 July 1989	2.02 m (6 ft 8 in)	BC Nizhny Novgorod	(Russia)
SF	12	Sergei Monia	32 – 15 April 1983	2.02 m (6 ft 8 in)	BC Khimki	(Russia)
PG	13	Dmitry Khvostov	26 – 21 August 1989	1.90 m (6 ft 3 in)	BC Nizhny Novgorod	(Russia)
SG	14	Anton Ponkrashov (C)	29 – 23 April 1986	2.00 m (6 ft 7 in)	UNICS Kazan	(Russia)
PF	20	Andrey Vorontsevich	28 – 17 July 1987	2.07 m (6 ft 9 in)	PBC CSKA Moscow	(Russia)
C	32	Andrey Desyatnikov	21 – 4 May 1994	2.20 m (7 ft 3 in)	B.C. Zenit Saint Petersburg	(Russia)
F	41	Nikita Kurbanov	28 – 5 October 1986	2.02 m (6 ft 8 in)	PBC CSKA Moscow	(Russia)

Head coach

- (Russia) Evgeniy Pashutin

Assistant coach(es)

- (Russia) Georgy Artemyev
- (Russia) Andrey Maltsev
- (Russia) Zakhar Pashutin

Legend

- (C) Team captain
- Club – describes last
  club before the tournament
- Age – describes age
  on 5 September 2015

== Group B ==
=== Germany ===
Germany men's national basketball team roster
Players
Coaches

Pos.	No.	Name	Age – Date of birth	Height	Club	Ctr.
G	4	Maodo Lô	22 – 31 December 1992	1.92 m (6 ft 4 in)	Columbia University	(United States)
SF	5	Niels Giffey	24 – 8 June 1991	2.01 m (6 ft 7 in)	ALBA Berlin	(Germany)
PF	7	Alex King	30 – 20 February 1985	2.00 m (6 ft 7 in)	ALBA Berlin	(Germany)
PG	8	Heiko Schaffartzik (C)	31 – 3 January 1984	1.83 m (6 ft 0 in)	Bayern Munich	(Germany)
SG	9	Karsten Tadda	26 – 2 November 1988	1.90 m (6 ft 3 in)	Brose Baskets	(Germany)
C	11	Tibor Pleiß	25 – 2 November 1989	2.16 m (7 ft 1 in)	Utah Jazz	(United States)
SF	12	Robin Benzing	26 – 25 January 1989	2.08 m (6 ft 10 in)	CAI Zaragoza	(Spain)
PF	14	Dirk Nowitzki	37 – 19 June 1978	2.13 m (7 ft 0 in)	Dallas Mavericks	(United States)
PG	17	Dennis Schröder	21 – 15 September 1993	1.88 m (6 ft 2 in)	Atlanta Hawks	(United States)
SG	21	Paul Zipser	21 – 18 February 1994	2.00 m (6 ft 7 in)	Bayern Munich	(Germany)
G	25	Anton Gavel	30 – 24 October 1984	1.89 m (6 ft 2 in)	Bayern Munich	(Germany)
C	77	Johannes Voigtmann	22 – 30 September 1992	2.09 m (6 ft 10 in)	Fraport Skyliners	(Germany)

Head coach

- (United States) Chris Fleming

Assistant coach(es)

- (Germany) Henrik Rödl
- (Germany) Martin Schiller
- (Germany) Alex Jensen

Legend

- (C) Team captain
- Club – describes last
  club before the tournament
- Age – describes age
  on 5 September 2015

=== Italy ===
Italy men's national basketball team roster
Players
Coaches

Pos.	No.	Name	Age – Date of birth	Height	Club	Ctr.
SG	3	Marco Belinelli	29 – 25 March 1986	1.96 m (6 ft 5 in)	Sacramento Kings	(United States)
SG	4	Pietro Aradori	26 – 9 December 1988	1.98 m (6 ft 6 in)	Reggio Emilia	(Italy)
G/F	5	Alessandro Gentile	22 – 12 November 1992	1.95 m (6 ft 5 in)	Emporio Armani	(Italy)
F	8	Danilo Gallinari	26 – 8 August 1988	2.08 m (6 ft 10 in)	Denver Nuggets	(United States)
C	9	Andrea Bargnani	29 – 26 October 1985	2.13 m (7 ft 0 in)	Brooklyn Nets	(United States)
C	12	Marco Cusin	30 – 28 February 1985	2.11 m (6 ft 11 in)	Vanoli Cremona	(Italy)
F	13	Luigi Datome (C)	27 – 27 November 1987	2.02 m (6 ft 8 in)	Fenerbahçe	(Turkey)
PF	17	Nicolò Melli	24 – 26 January 1991	2.05 m (6 ft 9 in)	Brose Baskets	(Germany)
PG	20	Andrea Cinciarini	29 – 10 January 1986	1.93 m (6 ft 4 in)	Emporio Armani	(Italy)
PG	23	Daniel Hackett	27 – 19 December 1987	1.99 m (6 ft 6 in)	Olympiacos	(Greece)
PF	33	Achille Polonara	23 – 23 November 1991	2.03 m (6 ft 8 in)	Reggio Emilia	(Italy)
PG	00	Amedeo Della Valle	22 – 11 April 1993	1.94 m (6 ft 4 in)	Reggio Emilia	(Italy)

Head coach

- (Italy) Simone Pianigiani

Assistant coach(es)

- (Italy) Luca Dalmonte
- (Italy) Mario Fioretti

Legend

- (C) Team captain
- Club – describes last
  club before the tournament
- Age – describes age
  on 5 September 2015

=== Iceland ===
Iceland men's national basketball team roster
Players
Coaches

Pos.	No.	Name	Age – Date of birth	Height	Club	Ctr.
SG	3	Martin Hermannsson	20 – 16 September 1994	1.91 m (6 ft 3 in)	KR Reykjavík	(Iceland)
SF	4	Axel Kárason	32 – 11 February 1983	1.93 m (6 ft 4 in)	Værløse Basket	(Denmark)
C	5	Ragnar Nathanaelsson	23 – 27 August 1991	2.18 m (7 ft 2 in)	Sundsvall Dragons	(Sweden)
PG	6	Jakob Sigurðarson	33 – 4 April 1982	1.93 m (6 ft 4 in)	Sundsvall Dragons	(Sweden)
C	8	Hlynur Bæringsson (C)	33 – 6 July 1982	2.01 m (6 ft 7 in)	Sundsvall Dragons	(Sweden)
SG	9	Jón Arnór Stefánsson	32 – 21 September 1982	1.96 m (6 ft 5 in)	CAI Zaragoza	(Spain)
SF	10	Helgi Már Magnússon	32 – 27 August 1982	1.98 m (6 ft 6 in)	KR Reykjavík	(Iceland)
PG	13	Hörður Vilhjálmsson	26 – 18 December 1988	1.91 m (6 ft 3 in)	Aries Trikala B.C.	(Greece)
SG	14	Logi Gunnarsson	33 – 5 September 1981	1.93 m (6 ft 4 in)	Njarðvíkur	(Iceland)
SF	15	Pavel Ermolinskij	28 – 25 January 1987	2.03 m (6 ft 8 in)	KR Reykjavík	(Iceland)
SF	24	Haukur Helgi Pálsson	23 – 18 May 1992	1.98 m (6 ft 6 in)	ICL Manresa	(Spain)
PG	29	Aegir Steinarsson	24 – 10 May 1991	1.83 m (6 ft 0 in)	Sundsvall Dragons	(Sweden)

Head coach

- (Canada) Craig Pedersen

Assistant coach(es)

- (Iceland) Finnur Freyr Stefánsson
- (Iceland) Arnar Guðjónsson

Legend

- (C) Team captain
- Club – describes last
  club before the tournament
- Age – describes age
  on 5 September 2015

=== Serbia ===
Serbia men's national basketball team roster
Players
Coaches

Pos.	No.	Name	Age – Date of birth	Height	Club	Ctr.
PG	4	Miloš Teodosić (C)	28 – March 19, 1987	1.95 m (6 ft 5 in)	CSKA Moscow	(Russia)
SF	5	Marko Simonović	29 – May 30, 1986	2.01 m (6 ft 7 in)	Pau-Orthez	(France)
C	6	Ognjen Kuzmić	25 – May 16, 1990	2.13 m (7 ft 0 in)	Panathinaikos	(Greece)
SG	7	Bogdan Bogdanović	23 – August 18, 1992	1.98 m (6 ft 6 in)	Fenerbahce	(Turkey)
F	8	Nemanja Bjelica	27 – May 9, 1988	2.09 m (6 ft 10 in)	Minnesota Timberwolves	(United States)
PG	9	Stefan Marković	27 – April 25, 1988	1.95 m (6 ft 5 in)	Baloncesto Málaga	(Spain)
SF	10	Nikola Kalinić	23 – November 8, 1991	2.02 m (6 ft 8 in)	Fenerbahce	(Turkey)
G	11	Nemanja Nedović	24 – June 16, 1991	1.92 m (6 ft 4 in)	Baloncesto Málaga	(Spain)
G/F	12	Dragan Milosavljević	26 – May 11, 1989	1.98 m (6 ft 6 in)	Alba Berlin	(Germany)
C	13	Miroslav Raduljica	27 – January 5, 1988	2.13 m (7 ft 0 in)	Panathinaikos	(Greece)
PF	14	Zoran Erceg	30 – January 11, 1985	2.11 m (6 ft 11 in)	Galatasaray	(Turkey)
C	15	Nikola Milutinov	20 – December 30, 1994	2.12 m (6 ft 11 in)	Olympiacos	(Greece)

Head coach

- (Serbia) Aleksandar Đorđević

Assistant coach(es)

- (Serbia) Miroslav Nikolić
- (Serbia) Jovica Antonić
- (Serbia) Milan Minić
- (Croatia) Goran Bjedov

Legend

- (C) Team captain
- Club – describes last
  club before the tournament
- Age – describes age
  on 5 September 2015

=== Spain ===
Spain men's national basketball team roster
Players
Coaches

Pos.	No.	Name	Age – Date of birth	Height	Club	Ctr.
C	4	Pau Gasol (C)	35 – 6 June 1980	2.13 m (7 ft 0 in)	Chicago Bulls	(United States)
SF	5	Rudy Fernández	30 – 4 April 1985	1.97 m (6 ft 6 in)	Real Madrid	(Spain)
PG	6	Sergio Rodríguez	29 – 12 June 1986	1.90 m (6 ft 3 in)	Real Madrid	(Spain)
C	7	Guillermo Hernangómez	21 – 27 May 1994	2.10 m (6 ft 11 in)	Real Madrid	(Spain)
G	8	Pau Ribas	28 – 2 March 1987	1.96 m (6 ft 5 in)	FC Barcelona	(Spain)
PF	9	Felipe Reyes	35 – 16 March 1980	2.06 m (6 ft 9 in)	Real Madrid	(Spain)
F	10	Víctor Claver	27 – 30 August 1988	2.06 m (6 ft 9 in)	Lokomotiv Kuban	(Russia)
SF	11	Fernando San Emeterio	31 – 1 January 1984	1.99 m (6 ft 6 in)	Valencia Basket	(Spain)
G	12	Sergio Llull	27 – 15 November 1987	1.92 m (6 ft 4 in)	Real Madrid	(Spain)
PF	13	Pablo Aguilar	26 – 9 February 1989	2.05 m (6 ft 9 in)	Gran Canaria	(Spain)
F	14	Nikola Mirotić	24 – 11 February 1991	2.08 m (6 ft 10 in)	Chicago Bulls	(United States)
PG	15	Guillem Vives	22 – 16 June 1993	1.92 m (6 ft 4 in)	Valencia Basket	(Spain)

Head coach

- (Italy) Sergio Scariolo

Assistant coach(es)

- (Spain) Jaume Ponsarnau
- (Spain) Txus Vidorreta
- (Spain) Ángel Sánchez-Cañete

Legend

- (C) Team captain
- Club – describes last
  club before the tournament
- Age – describes age
  on 5 September 2015

=== Turkey ===
Turkey men's national basketball team roster
Players
Coaches

Pos.	No.	Name	Age – Date of birth	Height	Club	Ctr.
PG	4	Kartal Özmızrak	19 – 29 August 1995	1.85 m (6 ft 1 in)	Beşiktaş	(Turkey)
SG	5	Sinan Güler (C)	31 – 8 November 1983	1.92 m (6 ft 4 in)	Galatasaray	(Turkey)
SF	6	Cedi Osman	20 – 8 April 1995	2.00 m (6 ft 7 in)	Anadolu Efes	(Turkey)
PF	7	Barış Hersek	27 – 26 March 1988	2.08 m (6 ft 10 in)	Fenerbahçe	(Turkey)
PF	8	Ersan İlyasova	28 – 15 May 1987	2.08 m (6 ft 10 in)	Detroit Pistons	(United States)
C	9	Semih Erden	29 – 28 July 1986	2.11 m (6 ft 11 in)	Darüşşafaka S.K.	(Turkey)
SG	10	Melih Mahmutoğlu	25 – 12 May 1990	1.91 m (6 ft 3 in)	Fenerbahçe	(Turkey)
C	11	Oğuz Savaş	28 – 13 July 1987	2.11 m (6 ft 11 in)	Darüşşafaka S.K.	(Turkey)
SG	12	Furkan Korkmaz	18 – 24 July 1997	2.00 m (6 ft 7 in)	Anadolu Efes	(Turkey)
PG	13	Ali Muhammed	32 – 10 April 1983	1.78 m (5 ft 10 in)	Fenerbahçe	(Turkey)
SG	14	Göksenin Köksal	24 – 8 January 1991	1.96 m (6 ft 5 in)	Galatasaray	(Turkey)
F/C	15	Furkan Aldemir	24 – 9 August 1991	2.07 m (6 ft 9 in)	Philadelphia 76ers	(United States)

Head coach

- (Turkey) Ergin Ataman

Assistant coach(es)

- (Turkey) Ufuk Sarıca
- (Turkey) Yakup Sekizkök
- (Turkey) Ömer Uğurata

Legend

- (C) Team captain
- Club – describes last
  club before the tournament
- Age – describes age
  on 5 September 2015

== Group C ==
=== Croatia ===
Croatia men's national basketball team roster
Players
Coaches

Pos.	No.	Name	Age – Date of birth	Height	Club	Ctr.
C	4	Ante Tomić	28 – 17 February 1987	2.17 m (7 ft 1 in)	Barcelona	(Spain)
PF	5	Damjan Rudež	29 – 17 June 1986	2.08 m (6 ft 10 in)	Minnesota Timberwolves	(United States)
PG	6	Rok Stipčević	29 – 20 May 1986	1.85 m (6 ft 1 in)	Dinamo Sassari	(Italy)
SG	7	Bojan Bogdanović	26 – 18 April 1989	2.00 m (6 ft 7 in)	Brooklyn Nets	(United States)
PF	8	Dario Šarić	21 – 8 April 1994	2.08 m (6 ft 10 in)	Anadolu Efes	(Turkey)
SG	9	Marko Tomas	30 – 3 January 1985	2.06 m (6 ft 9 in)	TED Ankara Kolejliler	(Turkey)
PG	10	Roko Ukić (C)	30 – 5 December 1984	1.96 m (6 ft 5 in)	Cedevita	(Croatia)
SG	11	Krunoslav Simon	30 – 24 June 1985	1.97 m (6 ft 6 in)	Armani Milano	(Italy)
PG	13	Dontaye Draper	31 – 10 August 1984	1.80 m (5 ft 11 in)	Lokomotiv Kuban	(Russia)
C	15	Miro Bilan	26 – 21 July 1989	2.15 m (7 ft 1 in)	Cedevita	(Croatia)
C	21	Luka Žorić	30 – 5 November 1984	2.11 m (6 ft 11 in)	Fenerbahce	(Turkey)
SF	23	Mario Hezonja	20 – 25 February 1995	2.01 m (6 ft 7 in)	Orlando Magic	(United States)

Head coach

- (Croatia) Velimir Perasović

Assistant coach(es)

- (Croatia) Dario Gjergja
- (Croatia) Aramis Naglić

Legend

- (C) Team captain
- Club – describes last
  club before the tournament
- Age – describes age
  on 5 September 2015

=== Georgia ===
Georgian men's national basketball team roster
Players
Coaches

Pos.	No.	Name	Age – Date of birth	Height	Club	Ctr.
PG	0	Jacob Pullen	25 – 10 November 1989	1.89 m (6 ft 2 in)	Cedevita	(Croatia)
PF	4	Nika Metreveli	24 – 14 January 1991	2.11 m (6 ft 11 in)	MIA Academy	(Georgia (country))
C	7	Zaza Pachulia (C)	31 – 10 February 1984	2.11 m (6 ft 11 in)	Dallas Mavericks	(United States)
PG	8	Giorgi Tsintsadze	29 – 7 February 1986	1.92 m (6 ft 4 in)	Gravelines	(France)
C	9	Giorgi Shermadini	26 – 2 April 1989	2.16 m (7 ft 1 in)	BC Andorra	(Andorra)
SG	10	Duda Sanadze	23 – 25 July 1992	1.96 m (6 ft 5 in)	San Diego Toreros	(United States)
G/F	11	Manuchar Markoishvili	28 – 17 November 1986	1.96 m (6 ft 5 in)	Darüşşafaka	(Turkey)
SF	12	Levan Patsatsia	31 – 27 September 1983	1.98 m (6 ft 6 in)	MIA Academy	(Georgia (country))
SF	13	Viktor Sanikidze	29 – 1 April 1986	2.03 m (6 ft 8 in)	TED Ankara Kolejliler	(Turkey)
PF	15	Beka Burjanadze	21 – 3 January 1994	2.03 m (6 ft 8 in)	Básquet Coruña	(Spain)
PF	23	Tornike Shengelia	23 – 5 October 1991	2.07 m (6 ft 9 in)	Saski Baskonia	(Spain)
SG	25	Besik Lezhava	29 – 21 February 1986	1.92 m (6 ft 4 in)	Dinamo Tbilisi	(Georgia (country))

Head coach

- (Serbia) Igor Kokoškov

Assistant coach(es)

- (Georgia (country)) David Ustiashvili
- (Georgia (country)) Kote Tugushi
- (United States) Jason Staudt
- (Serbia) Miloš Gligorijević

Legend

- (C) Team captain
- Club – describes last
  club before the tournament
- Age – describes age
  on 5 September 2015

=== Greece ===
Greece men's national basketball team roster
Players
Coaches

Pos.	No.	Name	Age – Date of birth	Height	Club	Ctr.
C	5	Ioannis Bourousis	31 – 17 November 1983	2.15 m (7 ft 1 in)	Real Madrid	(Spain)
PG	6	Nikos Zisis (C)	32 – 16 August 1983	1.97 m (6 ft 6 in)	Brose Baskets	(Germany)
SG	7	Vassilis Spanoulis	33 – 7 August 1982	1.93 m (6 ft 4 in)	Olympiacos	(Greece)
PG	8	Nick Calathes	26 – 22 February 1989	1.98 m (6 ft 6 in)	Panathinaikos	(Greece)
SF	9	Stratos Perperoglou	31 – 7 August 1984	2.03 m (6 ft 8 in)	FC Barcelona	(Spain)
SG	10	Kostas Sloukas	25 – 15 January 1990	1.90 m (6 ft 3 in)	Fenerbahçe	(Turkey)
PF	12	Kostas Kaimakoglou	32 – 15 April 1983	2.05 m (6 ft 9 in)	Unics Kazan	(Russia)
C	13	Kosta Koufos	26 – 24 February 1989	2.13 m (7 ft 0 in)	Sacramento Kings	(United States)
PF	15	Georgios Printezis	30 – 22 February 1985	2.06 m (6 ft 9 in)	Olympiacos	(Greece)
SF	16	Kostas Papanikolaou	25 – 1 August 1990	2.04 m (6 ft 8 in)	Denver Nuggets	(United States)
PG	17	Vangelis Mantzaris	25 – 16 April 1990	1.96 m (6 ft 5 in)	Olympiacos	(Greece)
SF	34	Giannis Antetokounmpo	20 – 6 December 1994	2.11 m (6 ft 11 in)	Milwaukee Bucks	(United States)

Head coach

- (Greece) Fotios Katsikaris

Assistant coach(es)

- (Greece) Thanasis Skourtopoulos
- (Greece) Dimitrios Priftis

Legend

- (C) Team captain
- Club – describes last
  club before the tournament
- Age – describes age
  on 5 September 2015

=== North Macedonia ===
Macedonia men's national basketball team roster
Players
Coaches

Pos.	No.	Name	Age – Date of birth	Height	Club	Ctr.
SF	4	Vladimir Brčkov	25 – 29 December 1989	2.00 m (6 ft 7 in)	KK Kožuv	(North Macedonia)
PG	5	Vlado Ilievski (C)	35 – 19 January 1980	1.87 m (6 ft 2 in)	Orlandina Basket	(Italy)
SG	6	Darko Sokolov	29 – 8 May 1986	1.90 m (6 ft 3 in)	KK Karpoš Sokoli	(North Macedonia)
PG	7	Aleksandar Kostoski	27 – 5 March 1988	1.88 m (6 ft 2 in)	KK Kumanovo	(North Macedonia)
SF	8	Vojdan Stojanovski	27 – 9 December 1987	1.95 m (6 ft 5 in)	BC Andorra	(Andorra)
SF	9	Damjan Stojanovski	27 – 9 December 1987	1.98 m (6 ft 6 in)	MZT Skopje	(North Macedonia)
SG	10	Marko Simonovski	26 – 28 June 1989	1.92 m (6 ft 4 in)	MZT Skopje	(North Macedonia)
C	11	Ljubomir Mladenovski	20 – 2 May 1995	2.10 m (6 ft 11 in)	MZT Skopje	(North Macedonia)
PF	12	Bojan Trajkovski	28 – 11 September 1986	2.08 m (6 ft 10 in)	Sigal Prishtina	(Kosovo)
F	13	Stojan Gjuroski	23 – 6 November 1991	2.03 m (6 ft 8 in)	BC Levski Sofia	(Bulgaria)
PF	14	Richard Hendrix	28 – 15 October 1986	2.03 m (6 ft 8 in)	Baloncesto Málaga	(Spain)
C	15	Predrag Samardžiski	29 – 11 April 1986	2.15 m (7 ft 1 in)	MZT Skopje	(North Macedonia)

Head coach

- (North Macedonia) Marjan Srbinovski

Assistant coach(es)

- (North Macedonia) Pero Blazevski
- (North Macedonia) Aleksandar Jončevski

Legend

- (C) Team captain
- Club – describes last
  club before the tournament
- Age – describes age
  on 5 September 2015

=== Netherlands ===
Netherlands men's national basketball team roster roster
Players
Coaches

Pos.	No.	Name	Age – Date of birth	Height	Club
SG	0	Yannick Franke	19 – 21 May 1996	1.90 m (6 ft 3 in)	Donar	(Netherlands)
PG	5	Leon Williams	23 – 19 March 1992	1.89 m (6 ft 2 in)	SPM Shoeters	(Netherlands)
SG	6	Worthy de Jong	27 – 14 March 1988	1.94 m (6 ft 4 in)	ZZ Leiden	(Netherlands)
PG	7	Charlon Kloof	25 – 20 March 1990	1.90 m (6 ft 3 in)	Rethymno Cretan Kings	(Greece)
SF	9	Mohamed Kherrazi	25 – 29 June 1990	2.00 m (6 ft 7 in)	ZZ Leiden	(Netherlands)
SF	10	Ralf de Pagter	26 – 22 July 1989	2.00 m (6 ft 7 in)	SPM Shoeters	(Netherlands)
SF	12	Kees Akerboom, Jr.	31 – 20 December 1983	2.00 m (6 ft 7 in)	SPM Shoeters	(Netherlands)
F/C	13	Roeland Schaftenaar	27 – 29 July 1988	2.11 m (6 ft 11 in)	Rethymno Cretan Kings	(Greece)
C	18	Nicolas de Jong	27 – 15 May 1988	2.10 m (6 ft 11 in)	Cholet Basket	(France)
PF	21	Robin Smeulders	28 – 19 June 1987	2.08 m (6 ft 10 in)	EWE Baskets Oldenburg	(Germany)
C	23	Henk Norel	27 – 17 September 1987	2.12 m (6 ft 11 in)	Basket Zaragoza 2002	(Spain)
G	44	Arvin Slagter (C)	29 – 19 October 1985	1.92 m (6 ft 4 in)	SPM Shoeters	(Netherlands)

Head coach

- (Netherlands) Toon van Helfteren

Assistant coach(es)

- (Netherlands) Sam Jones
- (Netherlands) Peter van Noord

Legend

- (C) Team captain
- Club – describes last
  club before the tournament
- Age – describes age
  on 5 September 2015

=== Slovenia ===
Slovenia men's national basketball team roster
Players
Coaches

Pos.	No.	Name	Age – Date of birth	Height	Club	Ctr.
SG	1	Nebojša Joksimović	34 – 17 January 1981	1.93 m (6 ft 4 in)	Krka	(Slovenia)
PG	5	Luka Rupnik	22 – 20 May 1993	1.85 m (6 ft 1 in)	Union Olimpija	(Slovenia)
SG	7	Klemen Prepelič	22 – 20 October 1992	1.91 m (6 ft 3 in)	EWE Baskets Oldenburg	(Germany)
G/F	9	Jaka Blažič	25 – 30 June 1990	1.96 m (6 ft 5 in)	Laboral Kutxa	(Spain)
SF	10	Mitja Nikolić	24 – 24 February 1991	2.00 m (6 ft 7 in)	Union Olimpija	(Slovenia)
SG	12	Zoran Dragić	26 – 22 June 1989	1.96 m (6 ft 5 in)	BC Khimki	(Russia)
PF	13	Miha Zupan	32 – 13 September 1982	2.05 m (6 ft 9 in)	Uşak Sportif	(Turkey)
PF	15	Jure Balažič (C)	34 – 12 September 1980	2.04 m (6 ft 8 in)	Gaziantep Basketbol	(Turkey)
C	17	Saša Zagorac	31 – 1 January 1984	2.06 m (6 ft 9 in)	Union Olimpija	(Slovenia)
C	23	Alen Omić	23 – 6 May 1992	2.15 m (7 ft 1 in)	CB Gran Canaria	(Spain)
PG	24	Jaka Klobučar	28 – 19 August 1987	1.98 m (6 ft 6 in)	ratiopharm Ulm	(Germany)
F/C	55	Uroš Slokar	32 – 14 May 1983	2.10 m (6 ft 11 in)	Sevilla	(Spain)

Head coach

- (Slovenia) Jure Zdovc

Assistant coach(es)

- (Slovenia) Gašper Potočnik
- (Greece) Stefanos Dedas
- (Slovenia) Rado Trifunović

Legend

- (C) Team captain
- Club – describes last
  club before the tournament
- Age – describes age
  on 5 September 2015

== Group D ==
=== Belgium ===
Belgium men's national basketball team roster
Players
Coaches

Pos.	No.	Name	Age – Date of birth	Height	Club	Ctr.
PG	4	Lionel Bosco	33 – 18 September 1981	1.75 m (5 ft 9 in)	Belfius Mons-Hainaut	(Belgium)
PG	5	Sam Van Rossom	29 – 3 June 1986	1.88 m (6 ft 2 in)	Valencia	(Spain)
F	7	Axel Hervelle (C)	32 – 12 May 1983	2.05 m (6 ft 9 in)	Bilbao Basket	(Spain)
F	8	Jean-Marc Mwema	25 – 5 December 1989	1.95 m (6 ft 5 in)	Antwerp Giants	(Belgium)
G	9	Jonathan Tabu	29 – 7 October 1985	1.84 m (6 ft 0 in)	Baloncesto Fuenlabrada	(Spain)
SG	10	Quentin Serron	25 – 25 February 1990	1.90 m (6 ft 3 in)	Oostende	(Belgium)
SF	12	Wen Mukubu	32 – 2 August 1983	1.98 m (6 ft 6 in)	Spirou Charleroi	(Belgium)
PF	13	Pierre-Antoine Gillet	24 – 16 April 1991	2.01 m (6 ft 7 in)	Oostende	(Belgium)
PF	14	Maxime de Zeeuw	28 – 26 April 1987	2.04 m (6 ft 8 in)	Nymburk	(Czech Republic)
C	22	Kevin Tumba	24 – 23 February 1991	2.06 m (6 ft 9 in)	Spirou Charleroi	(Belgium)
SF	23	Jean Salumu	25 – 26 July 1990	1.93 m (6 ft 4 in)	Oostende	(Belgium)
SG	24	Matt Lojeski	30 – 24 July 1985	1.98 m (6 ft 6 in)	Olympiacos	(Greece)

Head coach

- (Belgium) Eddy Casteels

Assistant coach(es)

- (Belgium) Pascal Angillis
- (Belgium) Jacques Stas

Legend

- (C) Team captain
- Club – describes last
  club before the tournament
- Age – describes age
  on 5 September 2015

=== Czech Republic ===
Czech Republic men's national basketball team roster
Players
Coaches

Pos.	No.	Name	Age – Date of birth	Height	Club	Ctr.
C	4	Petr Benda	33 – 25 March 1982	2.04 m (6 ft 8 in)	ČEZ Nymburk	(Czech Republic)
PF	5	Patrik Auda	26 – 29 August 1989	2.06 m (6 ft 9 in)	AZS Koszalin	(Poland)
G/F	6	Pavel Pumprla	29 – 13 June 1986	1.97 m (6 ft 6 in)	Obradoiro	(Spain)
SF	7	Vojtěch Hruban	26 – 29 August 1989	2.00 m (6 ft 7 in)	ČEZ Nymburk	(Czech Republic)
PG	8	Tomáš Satoranský (C)	23 – 30 October 1991	2.00 m (6 ft 7 in)	FC Barcelona	(Spain)
SG	9	Jiří Welsch	35 – 27 January 1980	2.00 m (6 ft 7 in)	ČEZ Nymburk	(Czech Republic)
F/C	10	Pavel Houška	31 – 23 January 1984	2.03 m (6 ft 8 in)	ČEZ Nymburk	(Czech Republic)
SF	11	Luboš Bartoň	35 – 7 April 1980	2.02 m (6 ft 8 in)	ČEZ Nymburk	(Czech Republic)
SG	12	David Jelínek	24 – 7 September 1990	1.94 m (6 ft 4 in)	KK Włocławek	(Poland)
PG	13	Jakub Šiřina	27 – 21 November 1987	1.87 m (6 ft 2 in)	BK Opava	(Czech Republic)
SF	14	Blake Schilb	31 – 23 December 1983	1.98 m (6 ft 6 in)	Galatasaray	(Turkey)
PF	24	Jan Veselý	25 – 24 April 1990	2.13 m (7 ft 0 in)	Fenerbahçe	(Turkey)

Head coach

- (Israel) Ronen Ginzburg

Assistant coach(es)

- (Czech Republic) Pavel Benes
- (Czech Republic) Lubomir Ruzicka

Legend

- (C) Team captain
- Club – describes last
  club before the tournament
- Age – describes age
  on 5 September 2015

=== Estonia ===
Estonia men's national basketball team roster
Players
Coaches

Pos.	No.	Name	Age – Date of birth	Height	Club	Ctr.
SG	4	Rain Veideman	23 – 1 October 1991	1.92 m (6 ft 4 in)	Kalev/Cramo	(Estonia)
PG	5	Tanel Sokk	30 – 20 January 1985	1.88 m (6 ft 2 in)	Tartu Ülikool/Rock	(Estonia)
SG	6	Gert Dorbek	30 – 10 June 1985	1.93 m (6 ft 4 in)	Tartu Ülikool/Rock	(Estonia)
PG	7	Sten Sokk	26 – 14 February 1989	1.84 m (6 ft 0 in)	Dynamo Moscow	(Russia)
PF	8	Janar Talts	32 – 7 April 1983	2.07 m (6 ft 9 in)	Tartu Ülikool/Rock	(Estonia)
SF	9	Gregor Arbet	32 – 19 June 1983	1.95 m (6 ft 5 in)	Kalev/Cramo	(Estonia)
SF	10	Erik Keedus	25 – 27 April 1990	1.97 m (6 ft 6 in)	Kalev/Cramo	(Estonia)
PF	11	Siim-Sander Vene	24 – 12 November 1990	2.03 m (6 ft 8 in)	Žalgiris	(Lithuania)
C	13	Joosep Toome	30 – 21 June 1985	2.08 m (6 ft 10 in)	Tartu Ülikool/Rock	(Estonia)
SF	14	Kristjan Kangur (C)	32 – 23 October 1982	2.01 m (6 ft 7 in)	Openjobmetis Varese	(Italy)
C	15	Reinar Hallik	31 – 5 January 1984	2.08 m (6 ft 10 in)	Rakvere Tarvas	(Estonia)
SG	20	Tanel Kurbas	27 – 8 May 1988	1.98 m (6 ft 6 in)	Tartu Ülikool/Rock	(Estonia)

Head coach

- (Estonia) Tiit Sokk

Assistant coach(es)

- (Estonia) Alar Varrak
- (Estonia) Andres Sõber
- (Estonia) Rait Käbin

Legend

- (C) Team captain
- Club – describes last
  club before the tournament
- Age – describes age
  on 5 September 2015

=== Latvia ===
Latvia men's national basketball team roster
Players
Coaches

Pos.	No.	Name	Age – Date of birth	Height	Club	Ctr.
F	5	Mareks Mejeris	24 – 2 September 1991	2.07 m (6 ft 9 in)	VEF Rīga	(Latvia)
PF	6	Rolands Freimanis	27 – 21 January 1988	2.10 m (6 ft 11 in)	Kalev/Cramo	(Estonia)
SG	7	Jānis Blūms (C)	33 – 20 April 1982	1.91 m (6 ft 3 in)	S.S. Felice Scandone	(Italy)
SG	9	Dairis Bertāns	25 – 9 September 1989	1.92 m (6 ft 4 in)	Bilbao Basket	(Spain)
SF	10	Jānis Timma	23 – 2 July 1992	2.01 m (6 ft 7 in)	VEF Rīga	(Latvia)
G/F	12	Kristaps Janičenoks	32 – 14 March 1983	1.96 m (6 ft 5 in)	Ventspils	(Latvia)
PG	13	Jānis Strēlnieks	26 – 1 September 1989	1.91 m (6 ft 3 in)	Brose Baskets	(Germany)
PF	14	Kaspars Bērziņš	30 – 25 August 1985	2.11 m (6 ft 11 in)	Krasnye Krylia	(Russia)
PG	19	Kaspars Vecvagars	22 – 3 August 1993	1.93 m (6 ft 4 in)	Žalgiris	(Lithuania)
G/F	23	Haralds Kārlis	24 – 29 April 1991	1.95 m (6 ft 5 in)	Seton Hall Pirates	(United States)
PG	31	Žanis Peiners	25 – 2 August 1990	2.04 m (6 ft 8 in)	Ventspils	(Latvia)
F/C	33	Mārtiņš Meiers	24 – 30 March 1991	2.08 m (6 ft 10 in)	Ventspils	(Latvia)

Head coach

- (Latvia) Ainars Bagatskis

Assistant coach(es)

- (Latvia) Ainars Zvirgzdiņš
- (Latvia) Artūrs Štālbergs
- (Latvia) Roberts Štelmahers

Legend

- (C) Team captain
- Club – describes last
  club before the tournament
- Age – describes age
  on 5 September 2015

=== Lithuania ===
Lithuania men's national basketball team roster
Players
Coaches

Pos.	No.	Name	Age – Date of birth	Height	Club	Ctr.
PG	5	Mantas Kalnietis	28 – 6 September 1986	1.95 m (6 ft 5 in)	Žalgiris	(Lithuania)
G/F	6	Deividas Gailius	27 – 26 April 1988	2.00 m (6 ft 7 in)	Lietuvos Rytas	(Lithuania)
SF	8	Jonas Mačiulis	30 – 10 February 1985	1.98 m (6 ft 6 in)	Real Madrid	(Spain)
SG	10	Renaldas Seibutis	30 – 23 July 1985	1.96 m (6 ft 5 in)	Žalgiris	(Lithuania)
F/C	11	Domantas Sabonis	19 – 3 May 1996	2.08 m (6 ft 10 in)	Gonzaga Bulldogs	(United States)
C	12	Antanas Kavaliauskas	30 – 19 September 1984	2.08 m (6 ft 10 in)	Lietuvos Rytas	(Lithuania)
PF	13	Paulius Jankūnas	31 – 29 April 1984	2.05 m (6 ft 9 in)	Žalgiris	(Lithuania)
C	15	Robertas Javtokas (C)	35 – 20 March 1980	2.11 m (6 ft 11 in)	Žalgiris	(Lithuania)
C	17	Jonas Valančiūnas	23 – 6 May 1992	2.13 m (7 ft 0 in)	Toronto Raptors	(Canada)
SF	19	Mindaugas Kuzminskas	25 – 19 October 1989	2.05 m (6 ft 9 in)	Unicaja Málaga	(Spain)
SG	21	Artūras Milaknis	29 – 16 June 1986	1.95 m (6 ft 5 in)	Unics Kazan	(Russia)
PG	43	Lukas Lekavičius	21 – 30 March 1994	1.80 m (5 ft 11 in)	Žalgiris	(Lithuania)

Head coach

- (Lithuania) Jonas Kazlauskas

Assistant coach(es)

- (Lithuania) Darius Maskoliūnas
- (Lithuania) Gintaras Krapikas

Legend

- (C) Team captain
- Club – describes last
  club before the tournament
- Age – describes age
  on 5 September 2015

=== Ukraine ===
Ukraine men's national basketball team roster
Players
Coaches

Pos.	No.	Name	Age – Date of birth	Height	Club	Ctr.
SF	4	Maksym Pustozvonov	28 – 16 April 1987	2.00 m (6 ft 7 in)	BC Budivelnyk	(Ukraine)
PG	5	Jerome Randle	28 – 21 May 1987	1.78 m (5 ft 10 in)	Eskişehir Basket	(Turkey)
PG	6	Olexandr Mishula	23 – 18 April 1992	1.94 m (6 ft 4 in)	BC Dnipro	(Ukraine)
PG	7	Denys Lukashov	26 – 30 April 1989	1.88 m (6 ft 2 in)	BC Budivelnyk	(Ukraine)
C	8	Kyrylo Fesenko (C)	28 – 24 December 1986	2.15 m (7 ft 1 in)	Lokomotiv Kuban	(Russia)
SF	9	Oleksandr Sizov	27 – 16 June 1988	1.99 m (6 ft 6 in)	BC Dnipro	(Ukraine)
PF	10	Stanislav Tymofeyenko	27 – 16 June 1988	2.02 m (6 ft 8 in)	BC Dnipro	(Ukraine)
SG	11	Oleksandr Lypovyy	23 – 9 October 1991	2.00 m (6 ft 7 in)	BC Budivelnyk	(Ukraine)
PF	12	Maksym Korniyenko	28 – 26 June 1987	2.06 m (6 ft 9 in)	BC Khimik	(Ukraine)
F/C	13	Ihor Zaytsev	26 – 11 May 1989	2.10 m (6 ft 11 in)	BC Khimik	(Ukraine)
C	14	Artem Pustovyi	23 – 25 June 1992	2.18 m (7 ft 2 in)	BC Khimik	(Ukraine)
G/F	15	Pavlo Krutous	23 – 9 April 1992	1.94 m (6 ft 4 in)	BC Kalev/Cramo	(Estonia)

Head coach

- (Ukraine) Yevgen Murzin

Assistant coach(es)

- (Ukraine) Alexander Lokhmanchuk
- (Ukraine) Leonid Ivatin
- (Ukraine) Yaroslav Zubrytskyy

Legend

- (C) Team captain
- Club – describes last
  club before the tournament
- Age – describes age
  on 5 September 2015
