= Kaspars Vecvagars =

Latvian basketball player and coach

Žalgiris-2
- Title: Head coach
- League: NKL

Personal information
- Born: 3 August 1993 (age 33) Riga, Latvia
- Listed height: 1.93 m (6 ft 4 in)
- Listed weight: 83 kg (183 lb)

Career information
- NBA draft: 2015: undrafted
- Playing career: 2012–2023
- Position: Point guard
- Coaching career: 2023–present

Career history

Playing
- 2010–2016: Žalgiris Kaunas
- 2012: →KK Baltai
- 2012–2013: →Lietkabelis Panevėžys
- 2016–2018: VEF Rīga
- 2018–2019: Wilki Morskie Szczecin
- 2019–2020: Palencia
- 2020–2021: Força Lleida
- 2021–2022: Bàsquet Girona
- 2023: Heroes Den Bosch

Coaching
- 2023–2025: Valmiera Glass ViA (assistant)
- 2025–2026: Valmiera Glass ViA
- 2026–present: Žalgiris-2

Career highlights
- As a player: 3× LKL champion (2014, 2015, 2016); LKF Cup winner (2015); LBL champion (2017); U20 EuroBasket All-Tournament Team (2013); LEB Oro promotion (2022); As a head coach: Latvian Basketball Cup winner (2026); LEBL champion (2026); LBL champion (2026)
Medals
Men's basketball
Representing Latvia
FIBA Europe Under-20 Championship
| Silver medal – second place | 2013 Estonia | U-20 Team |
FIBA Europe Under-18 Championship
| Bronze medal – third place | 2010 Lithuania | U-18 Team |

Kaspars Vecvagars (born 3 August 1993) is a former Latvian professional basketball coach and former player who played at the point guard position. He is currently the head coach for Žalgiris-2 of the National Basketball League (NKL).

== Professional career ==
On 25 January 2023, Vecvagars signed a 5-week contract with Heroes Den Bosch, with an option for an extension. After his experience in Netherlands, Kaspars call it a day in his player career and immediately started coaching.

== Coaching career ==
After serving as an assistant coach for two seasons, on 15 July 2025, he became the head coach of Valmiera Glass ViA of the Latvian-Estonian Basketball League, marking his first head coaching experience.

On 2 July 2026, Vecvagars made his return to Lithuania, signing a two-year contract as head coach of Žalgiris-2, the reserve team of Žalgiris Kaunas.

== National team career ==
Vecvagars and the Latvian national team secured third place in the 2010 European U-18 Championship. Vecvagars has represented the Latvian national youth team in several competitions, including 2011 FIBA Under-19 World Championship. Vecvagars was a member of Latvia national team in EuroBasket 2015.
