= Olek Czyż =

Polish basketball player (born 1990)

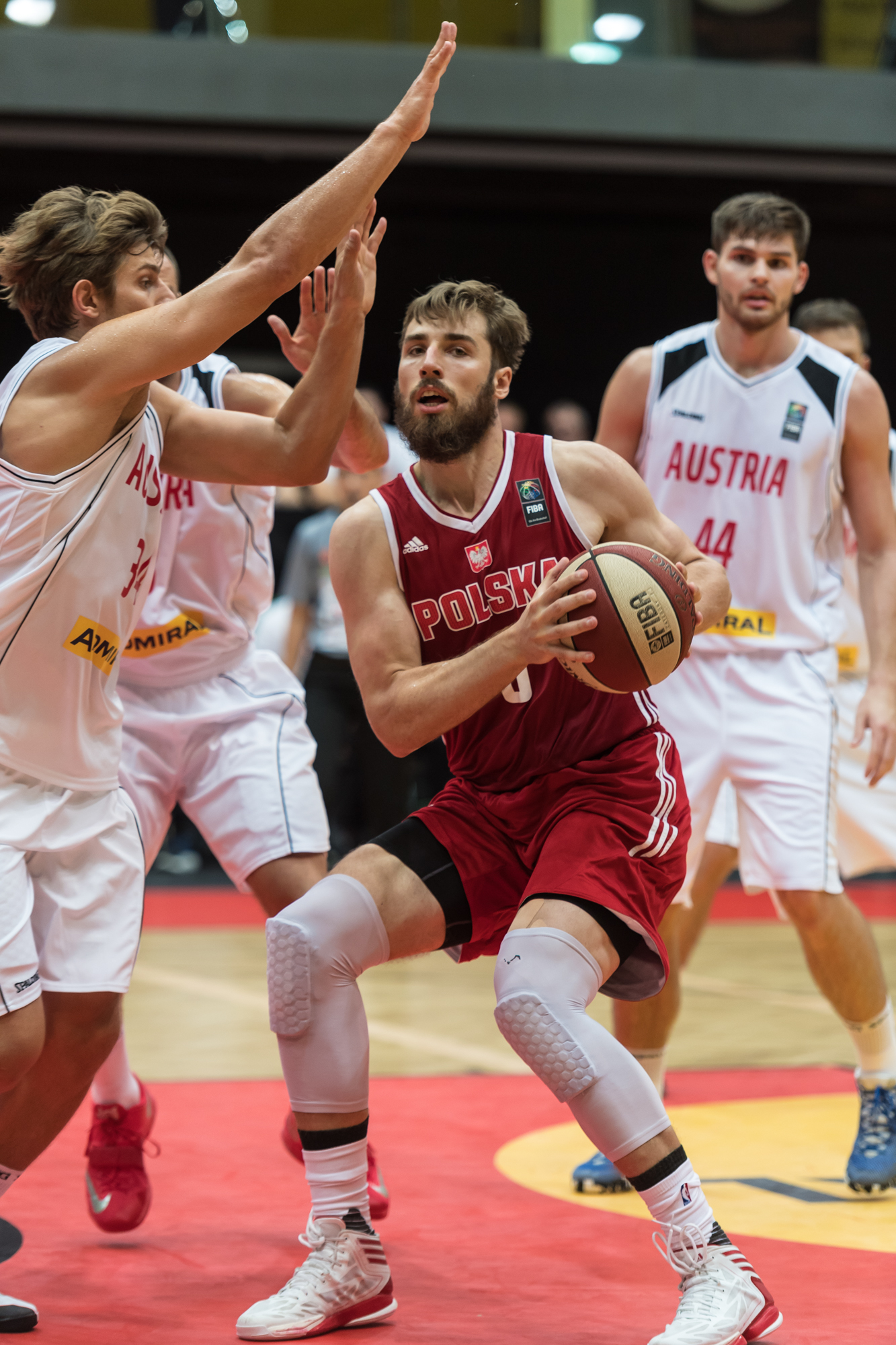
- Czyż during his tenure with Virtus Roma

Personal information
- Born: 3 March 1990 (age 36) Gdynia, Poland
- Listed height: 6 ft 8 in (2.03 m)
- Listed weight: 240 lb (109 kg)

Career information
- High school: Reno (Reno, Nevada)
- College: Duke (2008–2010); Nevada (2010–2012)
- NBA draft: 2012: undrafted
- Playing career: 2012–2019
- Position: Small forward / power forward

Career history
- 2012–2013: Virtus Roma
- 2013–2014: Fort Wayne Mad Ants
- 2014: Canton Charge
- 2015: Turów Zgorzelec
- 2015–2016: Pistoia
- 2016–2017: Juvecaserta
- 2019: Włocławek
- 2019: Gries Oberhoffen

Career highlights
- PLK champion (2019); PLK Rookie of the Year (2015); First-team All-WAC (2012); WAC All-Newcomer Team (2011)
- Stats at Basketball Reference

Aleksander "Olek" Czyż is a Polish former professional basketball player. He has also represented the Polish national team.

== Early years and college ==
Czyż grew up playing basketball in Poland. He first started playing when he was 10 years old for a club team called Prokom Trefl Gdynia. At the age of 14, he moved with his mother and sister to the United States and attended Reno High School, in Reno, Nevada, where he was a two-time state champion. He received scholarship offers to attend colleges around the country going into his senior year at Reno High School. Throughout his collegiate freshman, and half of his sophomore basketball season, Olek played for Duke University in North Carolina. He transferred to the University of Nevada, Reno, in Reno where he played during the 2010–11 and 2011–12 seasons. During his junior year, he was selected for the WAC All-Newcomer team. During his senior year, he was selected for the first-team All-WAC and led the Wolf Pack to a conference championship. Czyż graduated from Nevada with a bachelor's degree in speech communications in May 2012.

== Professional career ==
After going undrafted in the 2012 NBA draft, Czyż joined the Chicago Bulls for the 2012 NBA Summer League. On 12 August 2012, he signed with Virtus Roma of Italy for the 2012–13 season.

In July 2013, Czyż joined the Portland Trail Blazers for the 2013 NBA Summer League. On 30 September 2013, he signed with the Milwaukee Bucks. However, he was waived by the Bucks on 26 October 2013. In November 2013, he was acquired by the Fort Wayne Mad Ants as an affiliate player. On 2 January 2014, he was traded to the Canton Charge.

On 25 June 2014, Czyż signed with Enel Brindisi of Italy for the 2014–15 season. In July 2014, he joined the NBA D-League Select Team for the 2014 NBA Summer League. Upon his arrival at Brindisi, he failed his physicals and was subsequently released on 25 August 2014.

On 7 January 2015, Czyż signed with PGE Turów Zgorzelec of Poland for the rest of the 2014–15 season.

== Honours ==
Individual

- PLK Rookie of the Year: 2014–15
