= PLK Rookie of the Year =

Basketball award in Poland

The PLK Rookie of the Year award is an annual award in the Polish PLK that is given to the best newcomer in the Polish Basketball League. Import players can not win the award. A select group press members votes for the winner of the award.

== Winners ==
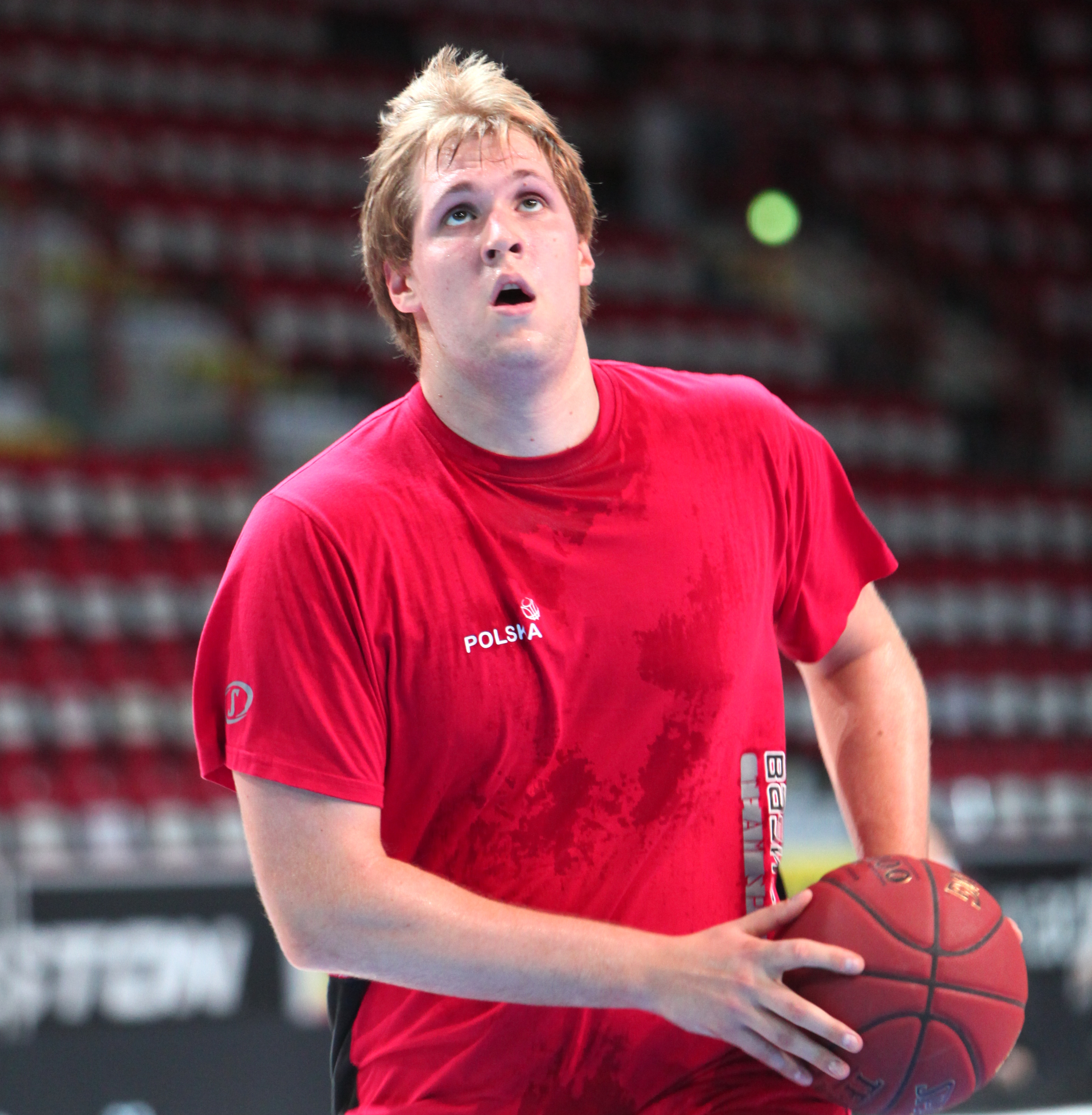
Przemysław Karnowski (2011–12)

Season	Player	Club	Ref.
2009–10	Dardan Berisha	Polonia 2011 Warszawa	
2010–11	Jakub Dłoniak	Zastal Zielona Góra	
2011–12	Przemysław Karnowski	Siarka Jezioro Tarnobrzeg	
2012–13	Artur Donigiewicz	Rosa Radom	
2013–14	Kacper Borowski	Energa Czarni Słupsk	
2014–15	Aleksander Czyż	Turów Zgorzelec	
2015–16	Igor Wadowski	AZS Koszalin	
2016–17	Filip Put	Asseco Gdynia	
