= Lucas Nogueira =

Brazilian basketball player (born 1992)

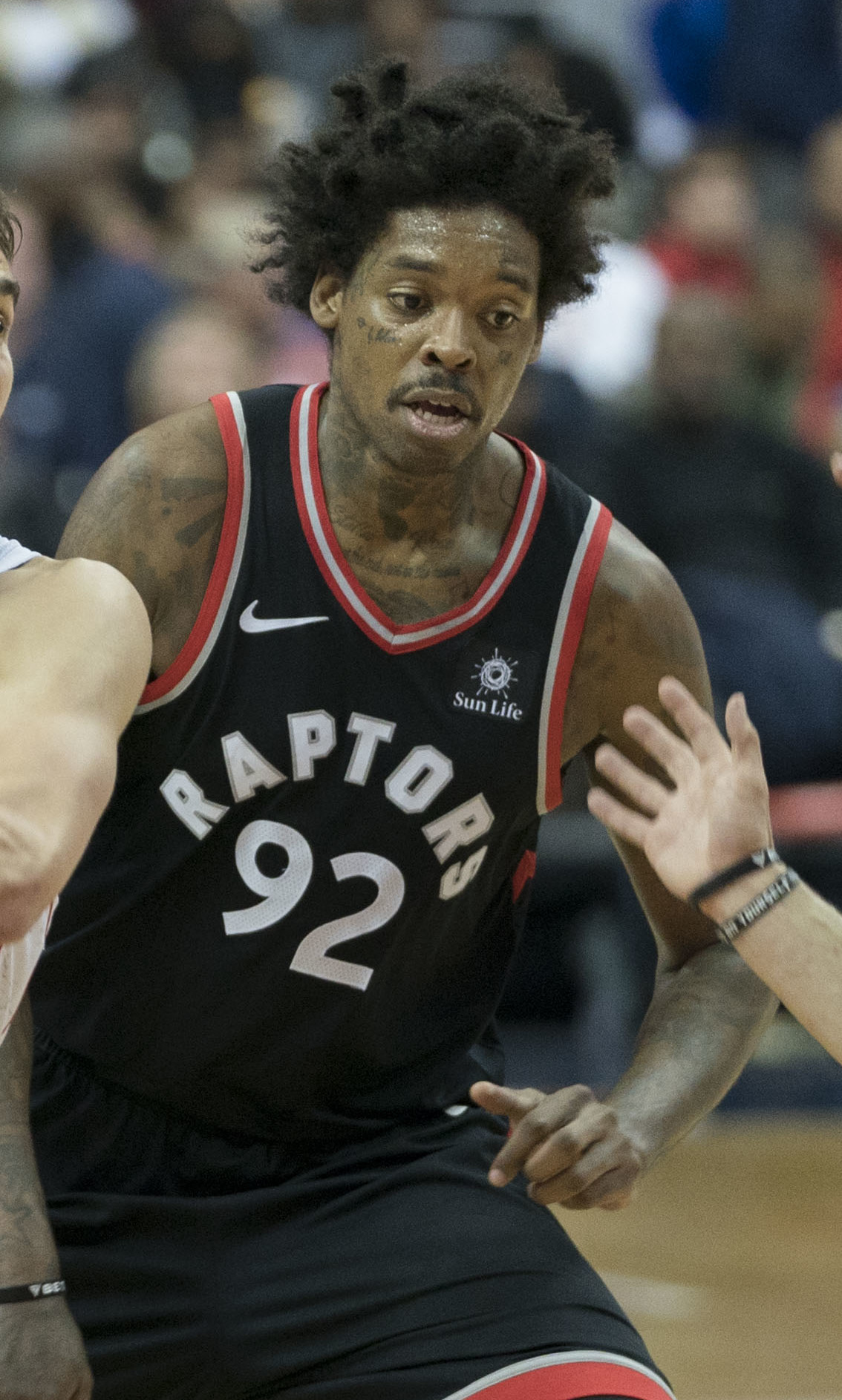
- Nogueira with the Toronto Raptors in 2018

Personal information
- Born: July 26, 1992 (age 34) São Gonçalo, Brazil
- Listed height: 7 ft 0 in (2.13 m)
- Listed weight: 220 lb (100 kg)

Career information
- NBA draft: 2013: 1st round, 16th overall pick
- Drafted by: Boston Celtics
- Playing career: 2009–2022
- Position: Center

Career history
- 2009–2014: Estudiantes
- 2011–2012: →CB Las Rozas
- 2014–2018: Toronto Raptors
- 2015: →Fort Wayne Mad Ants
- 2015–2016: →Raptors 905
- 2018: Fuenlabrada
- 2020: Al-Muharraq
- 2020–2021: Cearense
- 2021–2022: São Paulo FC
- 2022: Guelph Nighthawks
- 2022: Calgary Surge

Career highlights
- BCL Americas champion (2022)
- Stats at NBA.com
- Stats at Basketball Reference

Lucas Riva Amarante "Bebê" Nogueira (born July 26, 1992) is a Brazilian former professional basketball player. He was selected in the first round (16th overall pick) of the 2013 NBA draft by the Boston Celtics, but ultimately made his NBA debut with the Toronto Raptors in 2014.

== Professional career ==
=== Liga ACB career ===
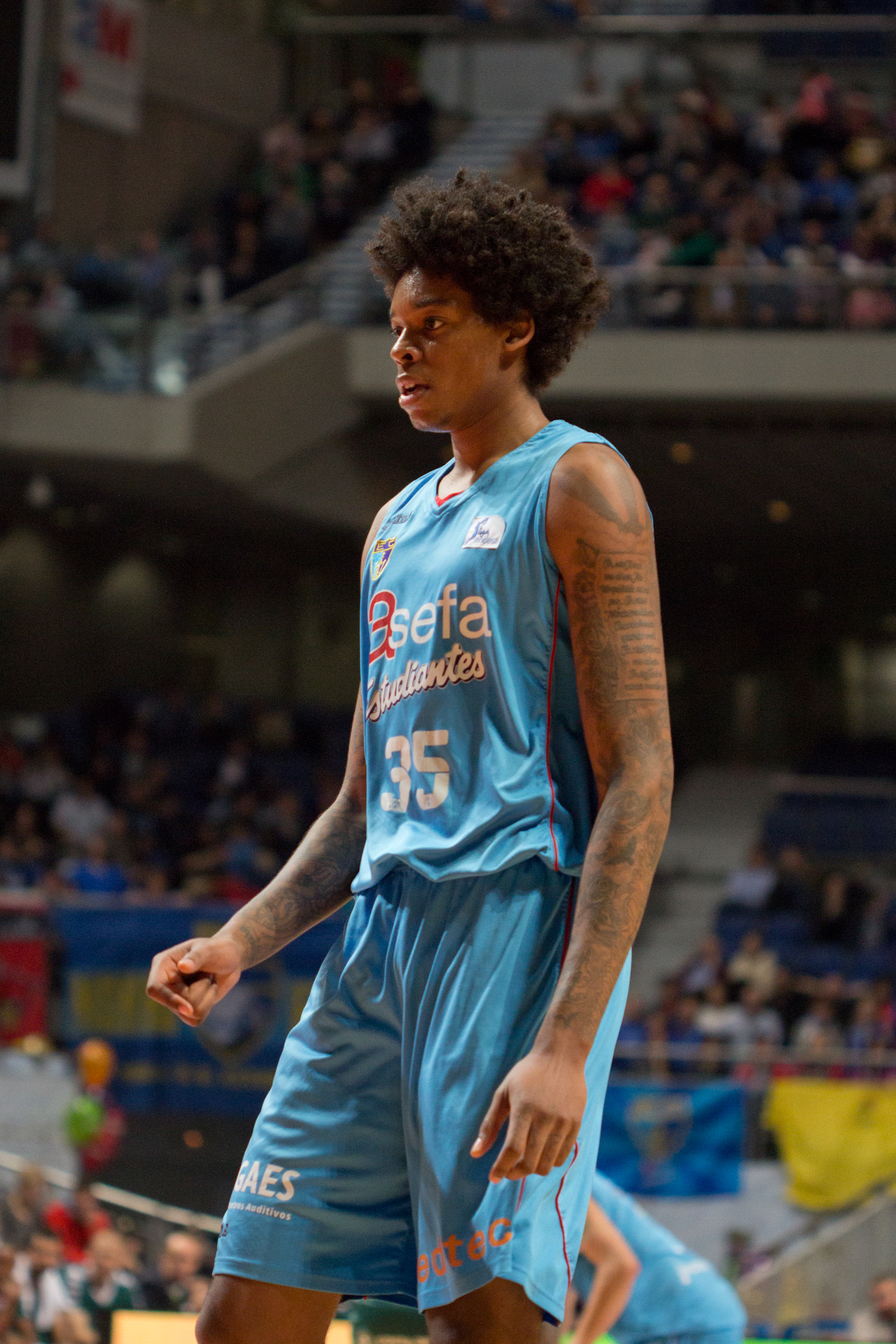
Nogueira playing with Estudiantes in 2013

From 2009 to 2011, Nogueira played for the CB Estudiantes junior team. In 2011, he was loaned to CB Las Rozas for the 2011–12 season. In January 2012, he joined CB Estudiantes for the rest of the 2011–12 ACB season, and re-joined the team for the 2012–13 season as well.

On June 27, 2013, the day of the NBA draft, Nogueira signed a two-year contract extension with Estudiantes. He went on to win the ACB's Best Defender award for the 2013–14 season.

=== NBA career ===
On April 17, 2013, Nogueira officially declared for the 2013 NBA draft. Because he had initially decided to declare for the 2011 NBA draft, but ultimately declined to enter it afterwards, Nogueira was not allowed to back out of the 2013 draft. He was selected with the 16th overall pick by the Boston Celtics on behalf of the Dallas Mavericks, who then traded his draft rights to the Atlanta Hawks. In July 2013, Nogueira joined the Hawks for the 2013 NBA Summer League.

On June 30, 2014, Nogueira's draft rights were traded, along with Lou Williams, to the Toronto Raptors in exchange for John Salmons and a 2015 second-round pick. In July 2014, he joined the Raptors for the 2014 NBA Summer League. On August 3, 2014, he signed with the Raptors. On November 21, 2014, he made his NBA debut against the Milwaukee Bucks. In eight minutes of action, he recorded two points, five rebounds and one steal in a 124–83 win. On March 12, 2015, he was assigned to the Fort Wayne Mad Ants of the NBA Development League. He was recalled by the Raptors on March 26, 2015.

In July 2015, Nogueira re-joined the Raptors for the 2015 NBA Summer League. On September 29, 2015, the Raptors exercised their third-year team option on Nogueira's rookie scale contract, extending the contract through the 2016–17 season. On December 5, 2015, he scored a career-high 14 points in a 112–109 loss to the Golden State Warriors. During the 2015–16 season, he had multiple assignments with Raptors 905 of the NBA Development League.

On October 23, 2016, the Raptors exercised their fourth-year team option on Nogueira's rookie scale contract, extending the contract through the 2017–18 season. On November 9, 2016, he scored 10 points on 5-for-5 shooting and had seven rebounds in a 112–102 win over the Oklahoma City Thunder. Three days later, he recorded six points, 10 rebounds, one assist, three steals and a career-high five blocked shots in a 118–107 win over the New York Knicks.

On October 30, 2017, Nogueira scored a career-high 17 points in a 99–85 win over the Portland Trail Blazers.

The Raptors did not extend a qualifying offer for the 2018–19 season, so Nogueira became an unrestricted free agent.

=== Later career and retirement ===
On September 19, 2018, Nogueira signed with Montakit Fuenlabrada.

In early 2020, he joined Al-Muharraq of the Bahraini Premier League.

In October 2020, he joined Cearense of the Novo Basquete Brasil. However, on February 3, 2021, Nogueira announced his early retirement from basketball on Instagram after confirming an injury he had combined with earlier injuries during his career forcing his decision there.

On August 21, 2021, Nogueira returned from retirement when he signed with São Paulo FC.

In 2022 Nogueira signed a contract to play in Canada with the Guelph Nighthawks of the CEBL.

== NBA career statistics ==
Legend
GP	Games played	GS	Games started	MPG	Minutes per game
FG%	Field goal percentage	3P%	3-point field goal percentage	FT%	Free throw percentage
RPG	Rebounds per game	APG	Assists per game	SPG	Steals per game
BPG	Blocks per game	PPG	Points per game	**Bold**	Career high

=== Regular season ===
Year	Team	GP	GS	MPG	FG%	3P%	FT%	RPG	APG	SPG	BPG	PPG
2014–15	Toronto	6	0	3.8	.250	-	.500	1.8	.2	.3	.0	1.0
2015–16	Toronto	29	1	7.8	.636	**.333**	.533	1.6	.2	.4	.4	2.2
2016–17	Toronto	**57**	**6**	**19.1**	**.660**	.250	.657	**4.3**	**.7**	**.9**	**1.6**	**4.4**
2017–18	Toronto	49	3	8.5	.613	.263	**.679**	1.8	.4	.5	.9	2.5
Career		141	10	12.4	.632	.265	.640	2.8	.5	.6	1.0	3.2

=== Playoffs ===
Year	Team	GP	GS	MPG	FG%	3P%	FT%	RPG	APG	SPG	BPG	PPG
2016	Toronto	**5**	0	**5.8**	**.750**	-	-	1.6	.0	.0	.0	**1.2**
2017	Toronto	3	0	2.3	.500	-	**.500**	**1.7**	.0	.0	.0	1.0
2018	Toronto	**5**	0	4.8	.000	-	**.500**	.2	**.2**	.0	.0	.2
Career		13	0	4.6	.571	-	.500	1.1	.1	.0	.0	.8

== National team career ==
Nogueira played for the Brazilian U-19 national team at the 2011 FIBA Under-19 World Championship. He was fifth in rebounds per game and second in blocks per game. He is also a member of the senior Brazilian national basketball team.

== Personal life ==
He married Caroline Kuczynski in Toronto on June 26, 2016, and separated on September 20, 2016. Later that same year, their daughter Stella was born. He filed for divorce on April 17, 2018.

He holds a Spanish passport.
