= Petar Lambić =

Serbian basketball player

Free agent
- Position: Shooting guard

Personal information
- Born: February 1, 1992 (age 34) Zrenjanin, SR Serbia, SFR Yugoslavia
- Listed height: 1.95 m (6 ft 5 in)

Career information
- NBA draft: 2014: undrafted
- Playing career: 2010–present

Career history
- 2010–2012: Hemofarm
- 2010–2011: → Proleter Zrenjanin
- 2012–2013: Proleter Zrenjanin
- 2013–2014: Vojvodina Srbijagas
- 2014–2015: Smederevo 1953
- 2015–2016: Academic Plovdiv
- 2016–2021: Proleter Zrenjanin
Medals
Men's basketball
Representing Serbia
U19 World Championship
Silver medal – second place	2011 Latvia	U19 National Team

Petar Lambić (Serbian: Петар Ламбић, born February 1, 1992) is a Serbian professional basketball player. Standing at 1.95 m (6 ft 5 in) he plays at the shooting guard position.
