= List of Polish basketball champions =

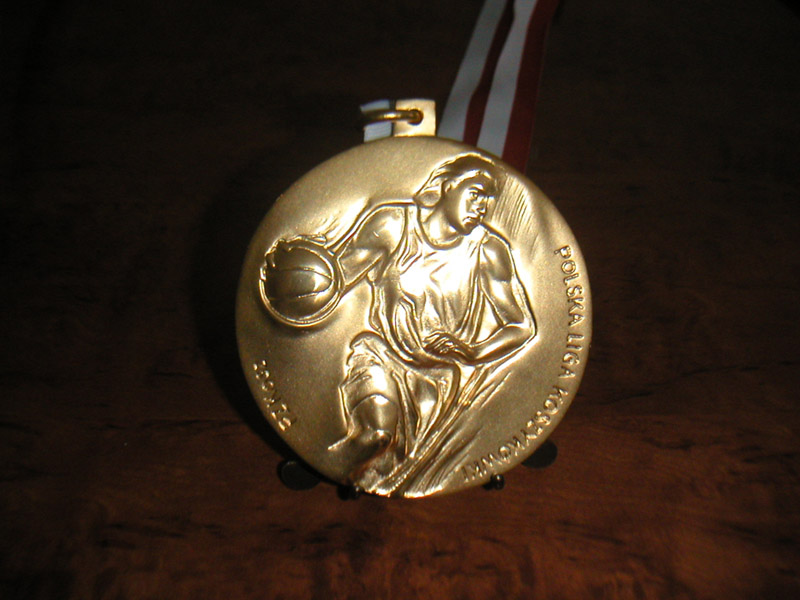
The gold medal that is handed out to the winners of the PLK

The Polish basketball champions, are the winners of the highest level of basketball in Poland, which is the Polish Basketball League (PLK). This page is a list of winners and runners-up in each given PLK season, along with additional information.

Śląsk Wrocław has won a total number of 18 titles, the highest of any club.

== List ==
=== Polish Championship ===
Season	Champions	Runners-up	Third Place
1928	Czarna Trzynastka Poznań	Varsovia Warsaw	Triumph Łódź
1929	Cracovia	Polonia Warsaw	Czarna Trzynastka Poznań
1930	AZS Poznań	Cracovia	Polonia Warsaw
1931	AZS Poznań (2)	Polonia Warsaw	Cracovia
1932	AZS Poznań (3)	Polonia Warsaw	Cracovia
1933	YMCA Kraków	WKS Łódź	Polonia Warsaw
1934	YMCA Kraków (2)	Polonia Warsaw	Lech (KPW) Poznań
1935	Lech (KPW) Poznań	Polonia Warsaw	Cracovia
1936	Not played.		
1937	AZS Poznań (4)	Lech (KPW) Poznań	Cracovia
1938	Cracovia (2)	AZS Poznań	Lech (KPW) Poznań
1939	Lech (KPW) Poznań (2)	Polonia Warsaw	AZS Lwów
1940–45	Not played.		
1946	Lech Poznań (3)	Cracovia	Warta Poznań
1947	AZS Warsaw	Wisła Kraków	Lech Poznań

=== I liga/Ekstraklasa ===
Season	Champions	Runners-up	Third Place
1947–48	YMCA Łódź	Lech Poznań	Warta Poznań
1948–49	Lech Poznań (4)	YMCA Łódź	Społem Łódź
1949–50	Społem Łódź	Lech Poznań	Spójnia Gdańsk
1950–51	Lech Poznań (5)	Spójnia Gdańsk	Społem Łódź
1951–52	Społem Łódź (2)	Wisła Kraków	Legia Warsaw
1952–53	ŁKS Łódź	Legia Warsaw	Lech Poznań
1953–54	Wisła Kraków	Polonia Warsaw	Spójnia Gdańsk
1954–55	Lech Poznań (6)	Legia Warsaw	AZS Warsaw
1955–56	Legia Warsaw	Wisła Kraków	Lech Poznań
1956–57	Legia Warsaw (2)	Polonia Warsaw	Wisła Kraków
1957–58	Lech Poznań (7)	Legia Warsaw	Wisła Kraków
1958–59	Polonia Warsaw	Wisła Kraków	Lech Poznań
1959–60	Legia Warsaw (3)	Polonia Warsaw	Śląsk Wrocław
1960–61	Legia Warsaw (4)	Lech Poznań	Wisła Kraków
1961–62	Wisła Kraków (2)	AZS Warsaw	Legia Warsaw
1962–63	Legia Warsaw (5)	Śląsk Wrocław	Wisła Kraków
1963–64	Wisła Kraków (3)	Śląsk Wrocław	Wybrzeże Gdańsk
1964–65	Śląsk Wrocław	Wisła Kraków	Start Lublin
1965–66	Legia Warsaw (6)	Wisła Kraków	Śląsk Wrocław
1966–67	AZS Warsaw (2)	Wisła Kraków	Śląsk Wrocław
1967–68	Wisła Kraków (4)	Legia Warsaw	Wybrzeże Gdańsk
1968–69	Legia Warsaw (7)	Wisła Kraków	Śląsk Wrocław
1969–70	Śląsk Wrocław (2)	Wybrzeże Gdańsk	Wisła Kraków
1970–71	Wybrzeże Gdańsk	Wisła Kraków	Śląsk Wrocław
1971–72	Wybrzeże Gdańsk (2)	Śląsk Wrocław	Polonia Warsaw
1972–73	Wybrzeże Gdańsk (3)	Resovia	Śląsk Wrocław
1973–74	Wisła Kraków (5)	Resovia	Śląsk Wrocław
1974–75	Resovia	Wisła Kraków	Wybrzeże Gdańsk
1975–76	Wisła Kraków (6)	Polonia Warsaw	Resovia
1976–77	Śląsk Wrocław (3)	Wisła Kraków	Resovia
1977–78	Wybrzeże Gdańsk (4)	Śląsk Wrocław	ŁKS Łódź
1978–79	Śląsk Wrocław (4)	Resovia	Start Lublin
1979–80	Śląsk Wrocław (5)	Wybrzeże Gdańsk	Start Lublin
1980–81	Śląsk Wrocław (6)	Górnik Wałbrzych	Zagłębie Sosnowiec
1981–82	Górnik Wałbrzych	Lech Poznań	Śląsk Wrocław
1982–83	Lech Poznań (8)	Górnik Wałbrzych	Gwardia Wrocław
1983–84	Lech Poznań (9)	Wisła Kraków	Zagłębie Sosnowiec
1984–85	Zagłębie Sosnowiec	Lech Poznań	Śląsk Wrocław
1985–86	Zagłębie Sosnowiec (2)	Górnik Wałbrzych	Śląsk Wrocław
1986–87	Śląsk Wrocław (7)	Gwardia Wrocław	Lech Poznań
1987–88	Górnik Wałbrzych (2)	Gwardia Wrocław	Lech Poznań
1988–89	Lech Poznań (10)	Śląsk Wrocław	Zagłębie Sosnowiec
1989–90	Lech Poznań (11)	Gwardia Wrocław	Śląsk Wrocław
1990–91	Śląsk Wrocław (8)	Lech Poznań	Zagłębie Sosnowiec
1991–92	Śląsk Wrocław (9)	Gwardia Wrocław	Bobry Bytom
1992–93	Śląsk Wrocław (10)	Anwil Włocławek	Gwardia Wrocław
1993–94	Śląsk Wrocław (11)	Anwil Włocławek	Lech Poznań
1994–95	Znicz Pruszków	Polonia Przemyśl	Anwil Włocławek
1995–96	Śląsk Wrocław (12)	Bobry Bytom	Polonia Przemyśl
1996–97	Znicz Pruszków (2)	Spójnia Stargard	Bobry Bytom

=== Polish Basketball League (1997–present) ===
Season	Champions	Score	Runners-up	Third Place
1997–98	Śląsk Wrocław (13)	4–3	Znicz Pruszków	Bobry Bytom
1998–99	Śląsk Wrocław (14)	4–3	Anwil Włocławek	Bobry Bytom
1999–00	Śląsk Wrocław (15)	4–1	Anwil Włocławek	Znicz Pruszków
2000–01	Śląsk Wrocław (16)	4–1	Anwil Włocławek	Prokom Trefl Sopot
2001–02	Śląsk Wrocław (17)	4–1	Prokom Trefl Sopot	Stal Ostrów Wielkopolski
2002–03	Anwil Włocławek	4–2	Prokom Trefl Sopot	Śląsk Wrocław
2003–04	Prokom Trefl Sopot	4–1	Śląsk Wrocław	Polonia Warsaw
2004–05	Prokom Trefl Sopot (2)	4–2	Anwil Włocławek	Śląsk Wrocław
2005–06	Prokom Trefl Sopot (3)	4–1	Anwil Włocławek	Czarni Słupsk
2006–07	Prokom Trefl Sopot (4)	4–1	Turów Zgorzelec	Śląsk Wrocław
2007–08	Prokom Trefl Sopot (5)	4–3	Turów Zgorzelec	Śląsk Wrocław
2008–09	Asseco Prokom Sopot (6)	4–1	Turów Zgorzelec	Anwil Włocławek
2009–10	Asseco Gdynia (7)	4–0	Anwil Włocławek	SKS Starogard Gdański
2010–11	Asseco Gdynia (8)	4–3	Turów Zgorzelec	Czarni Słupsk
2011–12	Asseco Gdynia (9)	4–3	Trefl Sopot	Stelmet Zielona Góra
2012–13	Stelmet Zielona Góra	4–0	Turów Zgorzelec	AZS Koszalin
2013–14	Turów Zgorzelec	4–2	Stelmet Zielona Góra	Trefl Sopot
2014–15	Stelmet Zielona Góra (2)	4–2	Turów Zgorzelec	Czarni Słupsk
2015–16	Stelmet Zielona Góra (3)	4–0	Rosa Radom	Czarni Słupsk
2016–17	Stelmet Zielona Góra (4)	4–1	Polski Cukier Toruń	Stal Ostrów Wielkopolski
2017–18	Anwil Włocławek (2)	4–2	Stal Ostrów Wielkopolski	Polski Cukier Toruń
2018–19	Anwil Włocławek (3)	4–3	Polski Cukier Toruń	Arka Gdynia
2019–20^{1}	Stelmet Zielona Góra (5)	—^{1}	Start Lublin	Anwil Włocławek
2020–21	Stal Ostrów Wielkopolski	4–2	Zastal Zielona Góra	Śląsk Wrocław
2021–22	Śląsk Wrocław (18)	4–1	Legia Warsaw	Anwil Włocławek
2022–23	King Wilki Morskie Szczecin	4–2	Śląsk Wrocław	Stal Ostrów Wielkopolski
2023–24	Trefl Sopot	4–3	King Wilki Morskie Szczecin	Śląsk Wrocław
2024–25	Legia Warsaw (8)	4–3	Start Lublin	Trefl Sopot
2025–26	Legia Warsaw (9)	4–3	Zastal Zielona Góra	Dziki Warsaw

^1 The 2019–20 PLK season was curtailed due to the COVID-19 pandemic. Standings at the time were declared final results.

== Titles by club ==
Bold and † indicate teams that still play in the top division

Club	Champions	Winning years
Śląsk Wrocław †	18	1964–65, 1969–70, 1976–77, 1978–79, 1979–80, 1980–81, 1986–87, 1990–91, 1991–92, 1992–93, 1993–94, 1995–96, 1997–98, 1998–99, 1999–00, 2000–01, 2001–02, 2021–22
Lech Poznań	11	1935, 1939, 1946, 1948–49, 1950–51, 1954–55, 1957–58, 1982–83, 1983–84, 1988–89, 1989–90
Legia Warsaw †	9	1955–56, 1956–57, 1959–60, 1960–61, 1962–63, 1965–66, 1968–69, 2024–25, 2025–26
Arka Gdynia †	9	2003–04, 2004–05, 2005–06, 2006–07, 2007–08, 2008–09, 2009–10, 2010–11, 2011–12
Wisła Kraków	6	1953–54, 1961–62, 1963–64, 1967–68, 1973–74, 1975–76
Zastal Zielona Góra †	5	2012–13, 2014–15, 2015–16, 2016–17, 2019–20
AZS Poznań	4	1930, 1931, 1932, 1937
Wybrzeże Gdańsk	4	1970–71, 1971–72, 1972–73, 1977–78
KK Włocławek †	3	2002–03, 2017–18, 2018–19
Cracovia	2	1929, 1938
YMCA Kraków	2	1933, 1934
AZS Warsaw	2	1947, 1966–67
Społem Łódź	2	1949–50, 1951–52
Górnik Wałbrzych †	2	1981–82, 1987–88
Zagłębie Sosnowiec	2	1984–85, 1985–86
Znicz Pruszków	2	1994–95, 1996–97
Czarna Trzynastka Poznań	1	1928
YMCA Łódź	1	1947–48
ŁKS Łódź	1	1952–53
Polonia Warsaw	1	1958–59
Resovia	1	1974–75
Turów Zgorzelec	1	2013–14
Stal Ostrów Wielkopolski †	1	2020–21
Wilki Morskie Szczecin †	1	2022–23
Trefl Sopot †	1	2023–24
