= Przemek Karnowski =

Polish basketball player (born 1993)

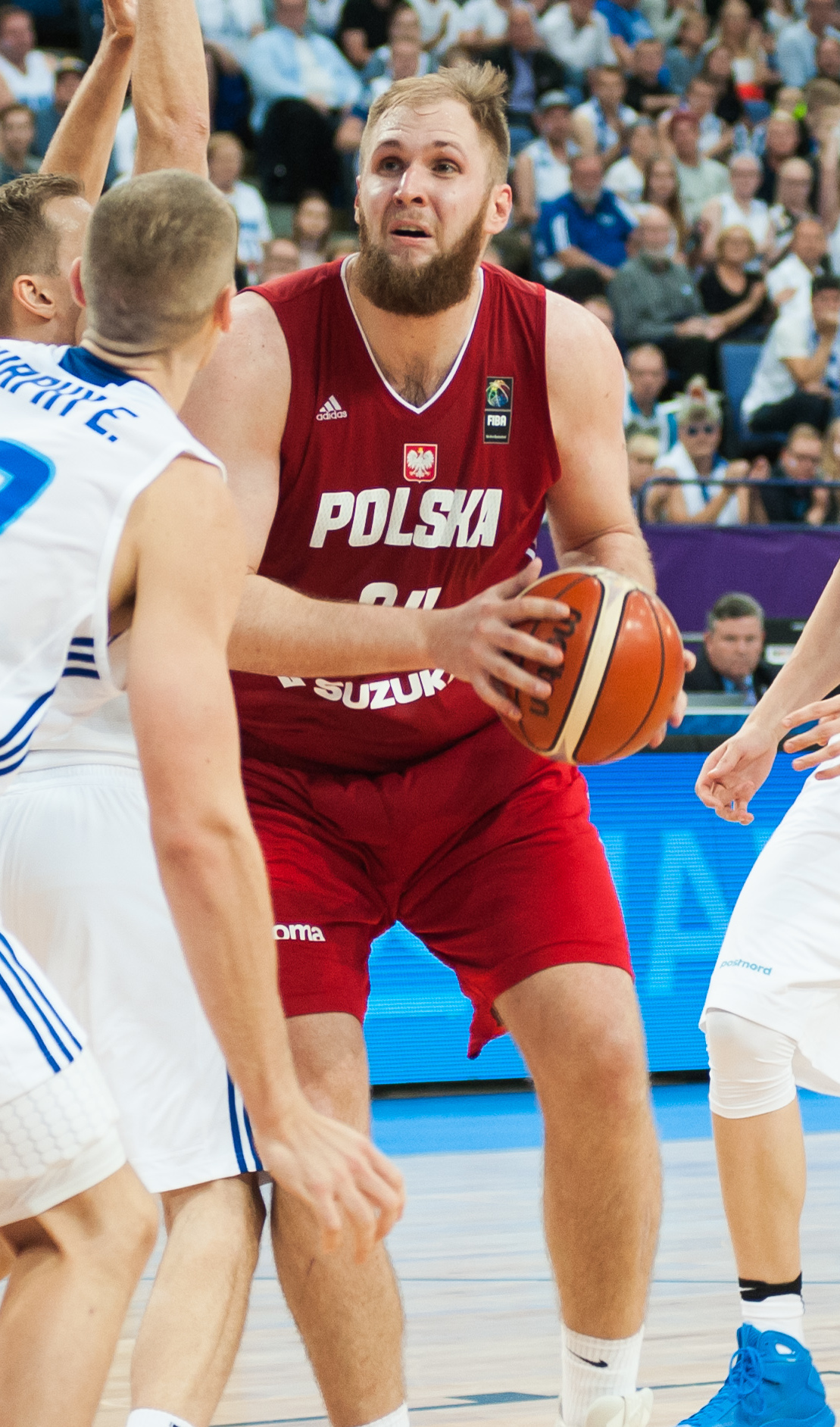
- Karnowski during EuroBasket 2017

Personal information
- Born: November 8, 1993 (age 33) Bydgoszcz, Poland
- Listed height: 7 ft 1 in (2.16 m)
- Listed weight: 285 lb (129 kg)

Career information
- College: Gonzaga (2012–2017)
- NBA draft: 2017: undrafted
- Playing career: 2009–2022
- Position: Center
- Coaching career: 2023–present

Career history

Playing
- 2009–2010: Toruń
- 2010–2011: Wladyslawowo
- 2011–2012: Siarka Tarnobrzeg
- 2017–2018: Andorra
- 2018: →Fuenlabrada
- 2020: Toruń
- 2021: Zielona Góra
- 2021-2022: Toruń

Coaching
- 2023-current: Arizona Wildcats (Graduate Assistant)

Career highlights
- PLK Rookie of the Year (2012); Kareem Abdul-Jabbar Award (2017); 2× First-team All-WCC (2015, 2017); WCC All-Freshman Team (2013)
Medals
Men's basketball
Representing Poland
U17 World Cup
| Silver medal – second place | 2010 Germany |

Przemysław Marcin "Przemek" Karnowski (Polish pronunciation: [ˈpʂɛmɛk karˈnɔfskʲi]; born 8 November 1993) is the Arizona men’s basketball graduate assistant and a former professional basketball player.

He completed his college career at Gonzaga University in the United States in 2017, and played professionally in Spain and Poland. He has also played for the Polish national team.

== College career ==
Przemek narrowed his decision down to California and Gonzaga. He committed to Gonzaga on May 29, 2012. For his freshman season he was behind star Canadian center Kelly Olynyk, a future lottery pick in the 2013 NBA draft. In the 2013–14 season Karnowski averaged 10.4 points, 7.0 rebounds and 1.7 blocks per game as the Bulldogs' starting center. As a junior, he averaged 11 points, 5.8 rebounds and 1 block per game. Due to back problems, Karnowski had surgery after playing only five games in his senior season. He was averaging 8.8 points and 5.4 rebounds in those five games.

The surgery followed a prolonged episode of back pain so severe that by the time of the operation, it took him over an hour to get out of bed and perform normal morning activities; he was also unable to walk without crutches. He developed an infection after undergoing the surgery and lost roughly 60 pounds (27 kg). Karnowski's recovery proceeded ahead of schedule; while he was told he would be unable to perform any strenuous activities for ten months post-operation, he was running after seven months. For the rest of his Gonzaga career, the team's training staff placed him on a customized conditioning program to protect his back, and he did not participate in any basketball-related activity outside of games and scheduled practices.

On May 24, 2016, Gonzaga announced that Karnowski had received a medical redshirt and would return to the school for one final college season in 2016–17. In his final college season, he led Gonzaga to the best start in the history of the organization (29-0) whilst posting the best offensive and defensive numbers of his career: 12.4 points, 5.8 rebounds, 2.0 assists and 0.9 block in just 22.5 minutes per game coming to the conference tournament. On February 2, 2017, Karnowski became the career leader in wins for Gonzaga, passing Kevin Pangos and Kyle Dranginis (both 122 wins). Karnowski became the active leader in Division I basketball games played with 143, passing Nigel Hayes (Wisconsin), Nate Britt and Isaiah Hicks (both North Carolina). Karnowski would be surpassed later that season by Hayes and Duke's Amile Jefferson, and passed both in a win in Gonzaga's Final Four matchup with South Carolina. After the 2017 West Coast Conference men's basketball tournament, Karnowski became the NCAA's career leader in wins with 132, passing Shane Battier (131). During his senior season he was nominated to the Kareem Abdul-Jabbar Award and Senior CLASS Award.

Karnowski graduated with a Bachelor of Education in Sport Management and MBA and one of the highest GPAs in the WCC, for which he was named to the 2016-17 WCC Men's Basketball All-Academic Team.

In the 2017 NCAA Division I men's basketball tournament, with a 13-point performance and two crucial baskets, Karnowski led his team to a 77–73 victory in the NCAA tournament semifinal, giving Gonzaga their first ever appearance in the national championship game.

During his tenure with Gonzaga Bulldogs, Karnowski became a fan favorite not only because his skills, but also because of his outgoing and friendly attitude as well as his signature beard. Some fans even wear fake beards during games to impersonate Karnowski. His name is found difficult to spell for basketball fans from the US, thus he was given fancy nicknames like "Shem" (short for "Przemysław"), "Big Shem," or "Mount Karnowski" (in reference to his size). His performances are also widely recognized in his home country of Poland. Tens of thousands of Polish fans watched his March Madness surge overnight, because of the time difference.

=== College statistics ===
| Year | Team | GP | GS | MPG | FG% | 3P% | FT% | RPG | APG | SPG | BPG | PPG |
|---|---|---|---|---|---|---|---|---|---|---|---|---|
| 2012–13 | Gonzaga | 34 | 1 | 10.8 | .567 | – | .444 | 2.7 | 0.2 | 0.2 | 0.3 | 5.4 |
| 2013–14 | Gonzaga | 36 | 36 | 25.3 | .593 | .000 | .500 | 7.0 | 0.7 | 0.3 | 1.7 | 10.4 |
| 2014–15 | Gonzaga | 38 | 37 | 24.5 | .622 | 1.000 | .509 | 5.8 | 1.3 | 0.5 | 1.0 | 11.0 |
| 2015–16 | Gonzaga | 5 | 5 | 24.8 | .594 | – | .462 | 5.4 | 1.2 | 0.8 | 0.6 | 8.8 |
| 2016–17 | Gonzaga | 39 | 39 | 22.9 | .601 | .000 | .582 | 5.8 | 2.1 | 0.4 | 1.0 | 12.2 |
| Career | | 152 | 118 | 21.2 | .600 | .333 | .513 | 5.4 | 1.1 | 0.4 | 1.0 | 9.8 |

== Professional career ==
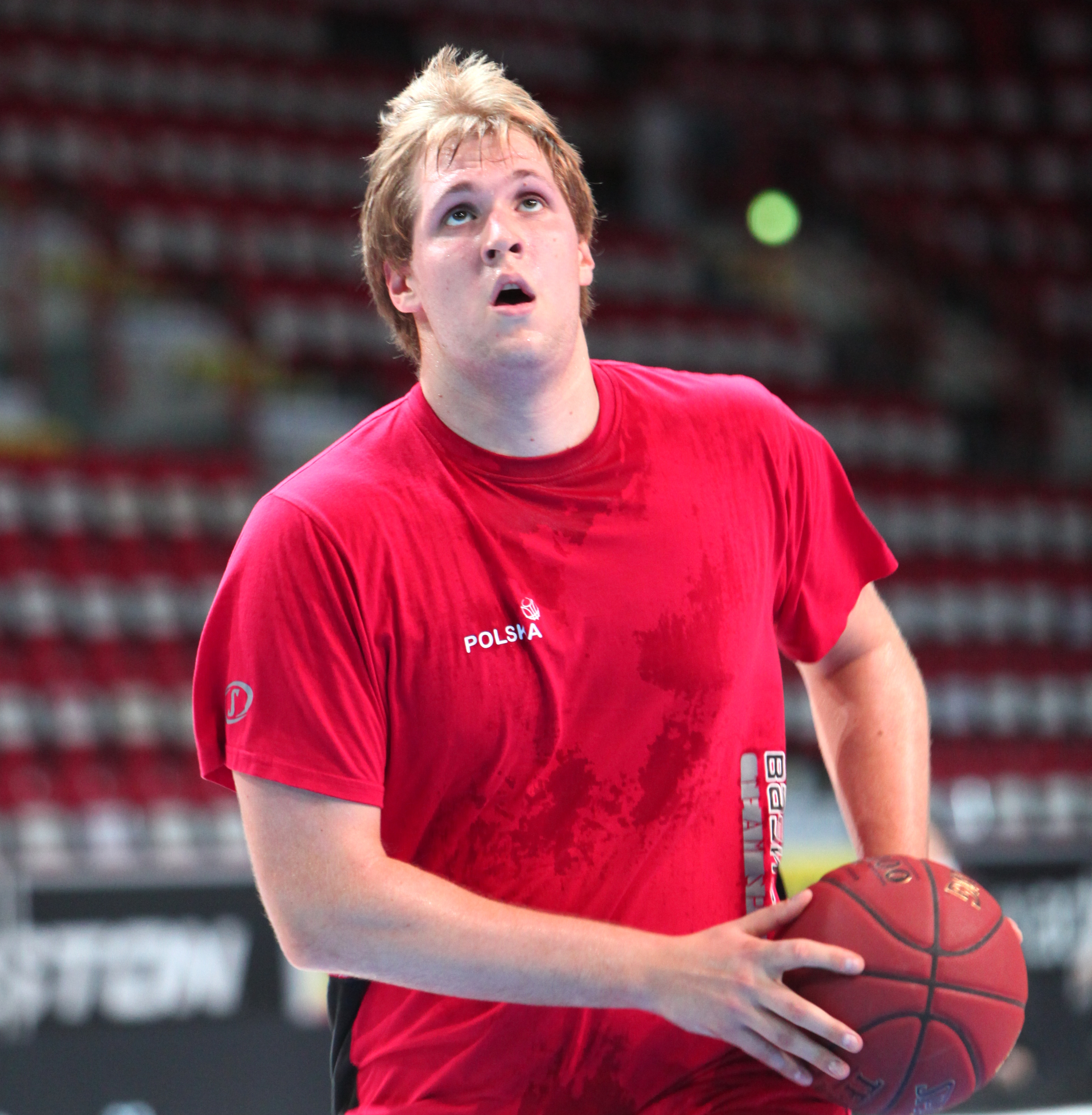
Karnowski warming up in 2012

In the 2011–12 season, Karnowski played for Siarka Jezioro Tarnobrzeg of the Polish PLK. In 35 games, he averaged 10.1 points, 4.4 rebounds and 1.2 blocks per game. After the regular season, Karnowski won the PLK Rookie of the Year Award.

He went undrafted in the 2017 NBA draft, but joined the Charlotte Hornets for the 2017 NBA Summer League.

On July 28, 2017, Karnowski agreed to terms with Spanish Liga ACB team MoraBanc Andorra. On July 8, 2018, Karnowski part ways with MoraBanc Andorra. On August 16, 2018, he signed with Twarde Pierniki Toruń of the Polish Basketball League.

On August 17, 2020, Karnowski signed with Stelmet Zielona Góra of the PLK and the VTB United League.

=== Professional career statistics ===
| Year | Team | GP | GS | MPG | FG% | 3P% | FT% | RPG | APG | SPG | BPG | PPG |
|---|---|---|---|---|---|---|---|---|---|---|---|---|
| 2009–10 | Pierniki Torun | 14 | 0 | 21.4 | .560 | .000 | .612 | 9.1 | 1.2 | .9 | 2.5 | 12.2 |
| 2010–11 | SMS Wladyslawowo | 23 | 0 | 31.0 | .517 | .250 | .547 | 9.6 | 1.3 | 1.1 | 2.1 | 14.0 |
| 2011–12 | ASK KS Siarka Tarnobrzeg | 35 | 18 | 25.6 | .520 | .067 | .560 | 4.4 | 1.3 | 0.7 | 1.2 | 10.1 |

== International career ==
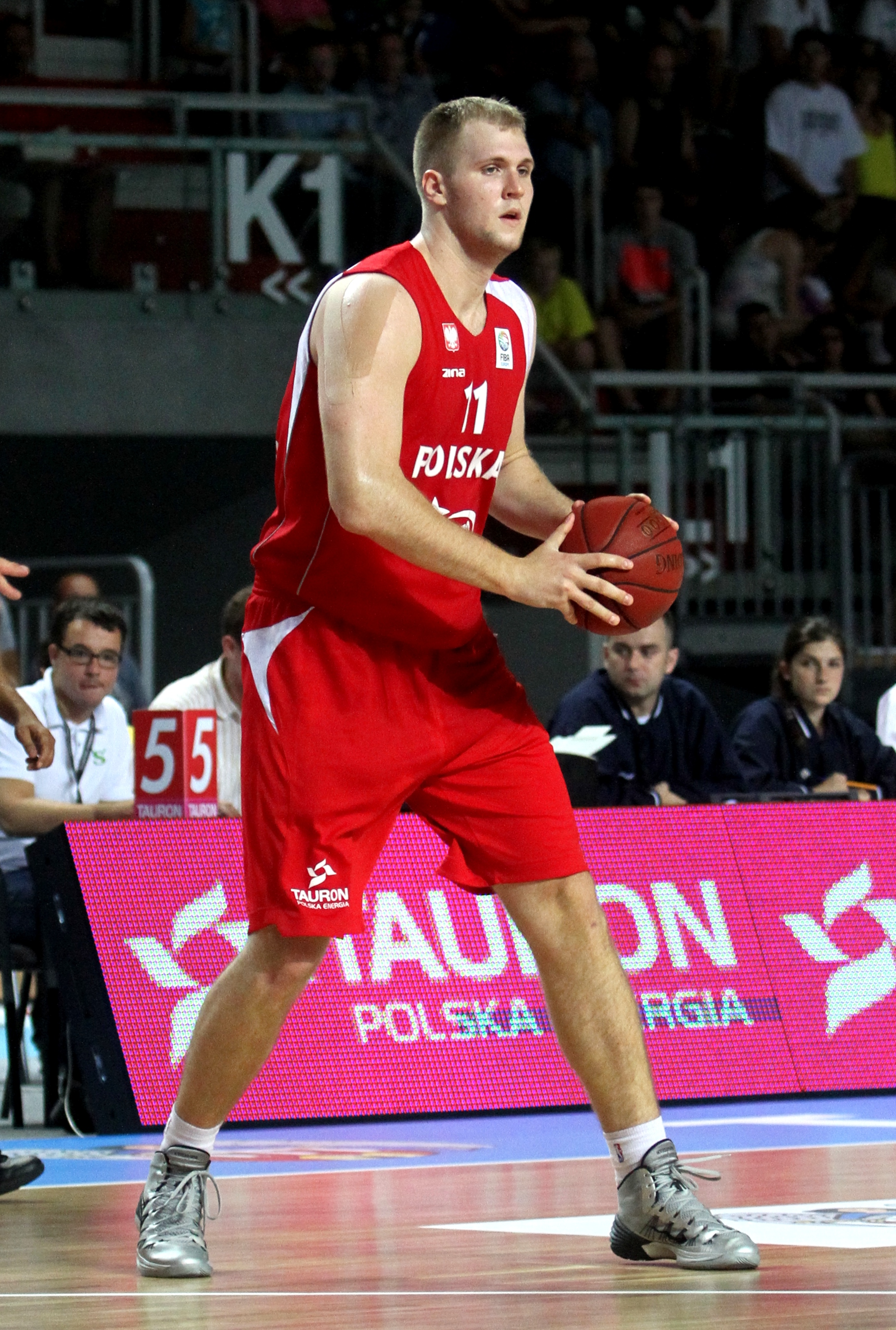
Karnowski with Poland in August 2014

Karnowski guided the Polish junior national team to the championship game of the 2010 FIBA Under-17 World Championship, in Hamburg. He was named to the All-Tournament Team. and was named Best Center of the tournament by Eurobasket.com after averaging 14.5 points, 11 rebounds, 2.5 assists and 2.0 blocked shots per contest. Joining him on the official All-Tournament Team was Canada's Kevin Pangos who would later be his teammate at Gonzaga.

Karnowski represented the senior Polish national basketball team at EuroBasket 2013, in Slovenia. He averaged 3.3 PPG, 2.5 RPG, and 0.3 APG.

== Coaching career ==
Karnowski joined the Arizona men’s basketball staff as a graduate assistant in January 2023.
