= Ukrainian Basketball All-Star Game =

- Status: Inactive
- Frequency: Annually
- Inaugurated: 2007-08
- Most recent: 2019-20
- Organizer: Ukrainian Basketball League; Basketball SuperLeague

The Ukrainian Basketball All-Star Game (also known as USL All-Star Game) was an annual basketball event in Ukraine, organised by the Ukrainian Basketball League and the Basketball SuperLeague. It was launched in 2008, but it was not held between 2014 and 2016. The event was held annually and consisted of an all-star game, a three-point shoot and skills challenge contest and a slam-dunk exhibition. Many notable players like Khalid El-Amin, Grigorij Khizhnyak, Sergiy Gladyr, Panagiotis Liadelis, Steve Burtt Jr., Patrick Beverley and Tomas Delininkaitis have played in the All-Star Game.

== List of games ==
Bold: Team that won the game.

Year	Date	Location	Team 1	Score	Team 2	MVP	Club
2008			Ukraine All-Stars	97-**99**	**Legion All-Stars**	(Greece) Panagiotis Liadelis	BC Azovmash
2009			**Ukraine All-Stars**	**128**-123	Legion All-Stars	(United States) Demetrius Alexander	BC Azovmash
2010	April 19	Meteor Palace of Sports, Dnipropetrovsk	Ukraine All-Stars	123-**125**	**Legion All-Stars**	(United States) John DeGroat	BC Odesa
2011	April 3	Kharkov	Ukraine All-Stars	86-**98**	**Legion All-Stars**	(United States) Steve Burtt Jr.	BC Dnipro
2012	February 25	Kharkov	Ukraine All-Stars	124-124	Legion All-Stars	(United States) Steve Burtt Jr. (2)	BC Dnipro
2013			Ukraine All-Stars		Legion All-Stars		
2004-2016	Not held						
2017	March 12	Dnipro	**North East**	**141**-133	South West	(Ukraine) Sergiy Zagreba	BC Dnipro
2018	January 27	Mykolaiv	**North**	**128**-123	South	(United States) Shaheed Davis	Cherkaski Mavpy
2019	January 26		**Ukraine All-Stars**	**154**-150	Legion All-Stars	(Ukraine) Pavlo Krutous	Kyiv-Basket
2020	February 20	Kyiv	Ukraine All-Stars	119-**126**	**Legion All-Stars**	(United States) Henry Dugat	BC Dnipro

== Three-Point Shoot Contest ==
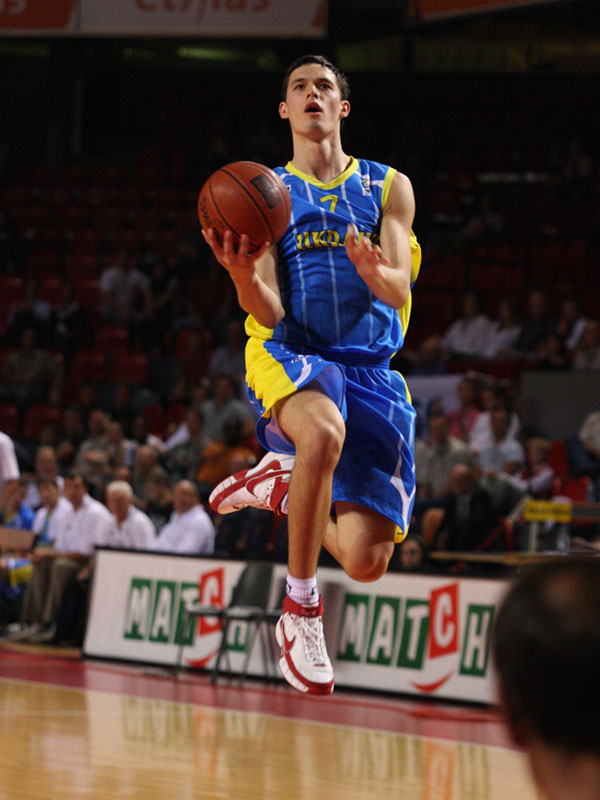
Sergiy Gladyr was the Three-Point Shoot Contest winner in 2009.

Year	Player	Team
2008	(Belarus) Yegor Mescheriakov	BC Azovmash
2009	(Ukraine) Sergiy Gladyr	MBC Mykolaiv
2010	(Ukraine) Alexander Rybalko	Ferro-ZNTU
2011	(Georgia (country)) Timur Arabadzhi	BC Politekhnik
2012	(Ukraine) Ruslan Otverchenko	BC Kyiv
2018	(Ukraine) Olexiy Onufriyev	MBC Mykolaiv
2019	(Ukraine) Maksym Zakurdaev	BC Dnipro
2020	(Ukraine) Maksym Lutsenko	Kyiv-Basket

== Slam-Dunk champions ==
Year	Player	Team
2008	(Ukraine) Witaly Kovalenko	BC Budivelnyk
2009	(United States) Anthony Tucker	BC Donetsk
2010	(United States) Charles Thomas (Ukraine) Konstantyn Glazyrin	BC Dnipro; Ferro-ZNTU
2011	(United States) Brian Greene	MBC Mykolaiv
2012	(United States) Randy Culpepper	Ferro-ZNTU
2019	(Russia) Alexander Zakharov	(Lithuania) BC Juventus
2020	(Ukraine) Pavlo Krutous	Kyiv-Basket

== Skills challenge ==
Year	Player	Team
2009	(United States) Wykeen Kelly	BC Khimik
2010	(Ukraine) Maksim Vilkhovetskyi	BC Dnipro
2012	(United States) Stanley Pringle	BC Dnipro-Azot

== Topscorers ==
Year	Player	Points	Team
2008	(Ukraine) Volodymyr Gurtovoy	30	BC Kharkiv
2009	(Ukraine) Sergiy Gladyr	24	MBC Mykolaiv
2010	(Ukraine) Maksym Zvonov	27	BC Kyiv
2011	(United States) Steve Burtt Jr.	27	BC Dnipro
2012	(United States) Steve Burtt Jr. (2)	47	BC Dnipro
2017	(Ukraine) Sergiy Zagreba	29	BC Dnipro
2018	(United States) Shaheed Davis	34	Cherkaski Mavpy
2019	(Ukraine) Pavlo Krutous	42	Kyiv-Basket
2020	(Ukraine) Maksym Pustozvonov	22	BC Kyiv

== Players with most selections ==
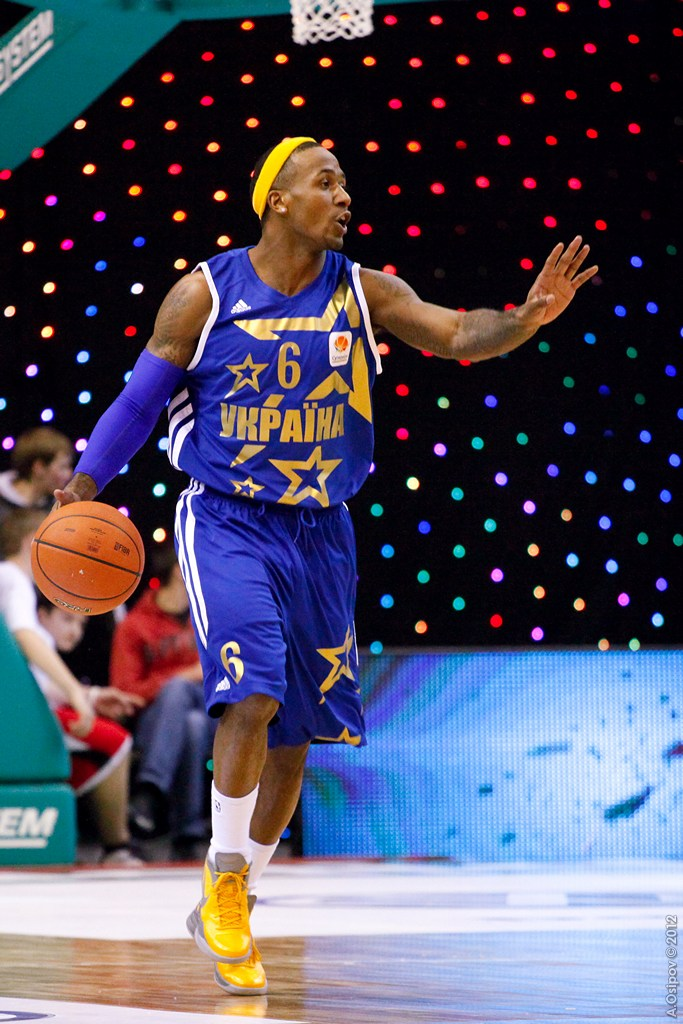
Steve Burtt Jr. was the MVP and topscorer in the 2011 edition.

Player	All-Star	Editions	Notes
(Ukraine) Viacheslav Kravtsov	4	2009, 2010, 2011 and 2012	
(Ukraine) Viacheslav Petrov	4	2017, 2018, 2019 and 2020	
(Ukraine) Artur Drozdov	3	2008, 2009 and 2012	
(Ukraine) Denys Lukashov	3	2009, 2011 and 2020	
(Ukraine) Dmytro Zabirchenko	3	2009, 2010 and 2011	
(United States) (Ukraine) Steve Burtt Jr.	3	2010, 2011, 2012	2x MVP
(United States) R.T. Guinn	2	2009, 2013	
(Russia) Andrey Agafonov	2	2009, 2010	
(Ukraine) Maksym Pustozvonov	2	2010, 2012	

== See also ==
- VTB United League All-Star Game
