= BC Politekhnika-Halychyna =

Politekhnika-Halychyna
- Nickname: "Students", "Lions"
- Leagues: Ukrainian League
- Founded: 1994
- Arena: SP "Halychyna"
- Location: Lviv, Ukraine
- Team colors: Green, white, black
- Head coach: Cyril Pohostinskyi
- Championships: 1994, 1999
- Website: bcpg.in.ua
Home	Away

BC Lvivska Politekhnika, formerly since 2006 till 2016 BC Politekhnika-Halychyna (Ukrainian: БК "Політехніка-Галичина"), is a professional basketball club from Lviv, Ukraine. The club participated in the Ukrainian Basketball Superleague.

Club was founded in 1994 under the name "Lviv Polytechnic". The team represented the Lviv Polytechnic National University.

The name was from 2006 till 2016 with sponsorship reasons (sponsor – refining complex "Galychyna"). Home arena – sports palace " Halychyna".

== History ==
In 1993, Lviv Polytechnic, made up of students who attended the university won a prestigious international tournament in France. This success and the achievements of previous years prompted the rector of the university, Yuri Rudavskyi, to establish a university professional basketball team. That same season, 1993–1994, Lviv team went undefeated in the Ukrainian second league, going 30-0. The next season, 1994–1995, the team finished third in the first division and was promoted to the Premier League. In order to become champions of the competition, the team took four seasons.

From 2000 to 2008 Polytechnic played in the Ukrainian Basketball SuperLeague. In the summer of 2006 the club changed its name to Politehnica-Halychyna (given to the new owner – refining complex "Galychyna") and had a very successful season in 2007–2008. Under the leadership of the Belarusian coach Valentin Voronin, the team finished fourth place in the Super League . Also, the team made it to the Ukrainian Final Four Cup, which won the bronze medal.

In the 2008–2009 season, the club decided to participate in the newly established Ukrainian Basketball League. On 15 May 2009, the newly established Association of Basketball Clubs of Ukraine "Superleague" Association became the organizer of the Championship, Cup and Super League All-Star Game. Since then, Politehnica-Halychyna has been a member of the Association of basketball clubs of Ukraine and regular participant of the Superleague Championship. Politehnica-Halychyna initially struggled in the Super League. In fact during the first two seasons the team finished in 11th place. In the 2011–12 season, it found itself in last place.

Fortunately, at the end of the disastrous year, Serbian coach Željko Lukajić was hired and the team improved significantly. And the fact that Lukajić remained head coach of Politehnica-Halychyna after the 2012–2013 season only added optimism Lviv fans. Moreover, in the off-season club signed several experienced players.

During the 2012-2013 regular Superleague season the team finished fifth with a record of 24-15 and ensure a place in the playoffs games. After sweeping its quarterfinal series against BC "Khimik" 4–0, Politehnica-Halychyna was promptly swept 4-0 by "Budivelnyk" in the following round. In the series to determine third place, Politehnica-Halychyna was also swept by "Ferro ZNTU" 4-0 to finish the season in 4th place.

In the off season the team signed Kyndall Dykes and Jaroslav Lemyk. Politehnica-Halychyna also signed Israeli point guard Naveh Menin to a two-year contract (2012–2014), allowing him to play for both the Superleague team and the club’s Division 2 developmental team. Naveh Menin, known for his sharpshooting and leadership at the point guard position, averaged 26.8 points and 7.5 assists per game for the Division 2 team, while contributing 16 points and 5 assists per game for the Superleague team. The 2013-2014 season also saw the addition of Maxim Ivshyn, who had previously played for BC "Goverla" and "Cherkaski Mavpy" and Alexander Kolchenko of BC "Azovmash". In November, Darrel Mitchell rejoined the club, who the previous season had played 46 games for Politehnica-Halychnya, averaging 15.8 points per game. On 17 December 2013 by mutual consent, Politehnica-Halychyna and Mitchell agreed to end their contract. The next day, on 18 December 2013, BC "Politehnica-Halychyna" severed ties with head coach Lukajić, his assistant Dushan Hvozdich, and forward Vladan Vukosavljević. During his three years with the club, Vukosavljević averaged 14.2 points, 9.0 rebounds and 1.2 assists per game.

After the termination of the contract of head coach and his assistant's, CEO Cyril Pohostinskyy hired Andry Kremez, who had previously coached BC Goverla. On 4 January 2014 team signed American point guard Anthony Miles, who had spent the previous season in the Netherlands, where he played 32 games for the club Rotterdam.

On 5 March 2014, the team released American PG/SG Kyndall Dykes, who stated on his Twitter account,"Want to say thanks to Lviv team and fans for a good run while it but we parting ways today good luck to the guys there rest of the way."

Difficult for most teams season 2013–14 team finished on the ninth place. After losing in the last match of the regular season, Halychyna lost chance to continue the struggle in the play-off, passing in eighth place "Kyiv" (with the same number of wins and losses), which lost twice in the season

In the season 2014–2015 Lviv "Polytechnica-Halychyna" began to train young Ukrainian expert Maxim Fomichov (born 1990). Previously, new coach worked in BC Donetsk basketball club, Russians BC UNICS and PBC CSKA Moscow. The team also began the season as part of the young players. Іе at the start of the championship did not bring results. A series of eight defeats could interrupt only home game against BC Dnipro-Azot Dniprodzerzhynsk, difficult victory with a score of 84:82.

26 November 2014 the club president dismissed head coach Maxim Fomichev. Acting head coach again became CEO Cyril Pohostinskyy. Playing coach was an alumnus of Lviv basketball school Jaroslav Zubrytskyi.

In early January 2015 the club decided to return to the position coach 24-year-old Maxim Fomichev.

28 February 2015 in a home match against "MBC Mykolaiv" former outsiders get the fourth in this season victory. At the end of the regular season 2014/2015, in the third round team showed a good game, had 7 wins in a season. But by the results of the games finished season on the 11th place with 37 points and lost chances for playoff. After the end of the regular season Basketball clubs association "Superleague" applied penalties against teams who fails to pay the entry fee. "Politehnica-Halychyna" lost other one point, but finished Championship in 10th place.

In season 2015–2016 Lviv presents two basketball teams: "Lviv Polytechnic" play in the championship under the presidency of the Ukrainian Basketball Federation, and "Halychyna" – in the "Superleague" championship.

The team went to the quarterfinal of SuperLeague Cup. Victory in the second match with Hoverla with a score of 81:75 was not enough to reach the semifinals.

Regular stage of championship in this season team finishes with 22 points in the asset with 8 wins and 6 defeats and will start playoff from third place. Having won in two of three matches of BC Kharkiv and losing both matches with BC Budivelnyk Halychyna does not get to the final play-off and finishing season 2015/2016 in third place.

== Season by season ==
Playoff berth

Season	Tier	League	Finish	Wins	Losses	Win%	Playoffs	Ukrainian Cup	Head coach
Politekhnika-Halychyna
2012–13	1	SuperLeague	5th	24	15	.615	Won quarterfinals (Khimik), 4–0; Lost semifinals (Budivelnyk), 0–4; Lost third place (BC Ferro-ZNTU), 0–4	–	
2013–14	1	SuperLeague	9th	12	14	.462	–	–	
2014–15	1	SuperLeague	10th	7	23	.233	–	–	
2015–16	1	SuperLeague	3rd	8	6	.571	Won quarterfinals (BC Kharkiv), 2–1; Lost semifinals (BC Budivelnyk), 0–2	–	

== Current roster ==
=== Season 2014–2015 ===
#	Name	Pos.	Height	Weight	Born	Nat.	Played from – to
_	Oleksandr Berkhin	F	2.05	100	1985	(Ukraine)	2014/11/07
7	Oleksandr Dolenko	PG	1.89	80	1990	(Ukraine)	2014/09/27
8	Maksym Tiutiunnyk	PG	1.90	85	1992	(Ukraine)	2013/11/10
10	Yuriy Kuschak	C	1.98	92	1993	(Ukraine)	2014/09/27
12	Yaroslav Zubrytskyi	C	2.02	108	1974	(Ukraine)	2014/09/27
14	Anton Dziuba	F	2.04	92	1990	(Ukraine)	2014/09/27
15	Anton Davydiuk	F	2.05	88	1992	(Ukraine)	2014/09/27
17	Volodymyr Orlenko	C	2.12	118	1985	(Ukraine)	2014/10/29
21	Vladyslav Petrenko	PG	1.80	75	1994	(Ukraine)	2014/09/27 – 2014/10/29
21	Illia Shemosiuk	PG	1.88	83	1985	(Ukraine)	2014/10/29
22	Artem Shelukha	F	1.98	97	1987	(Ukraine)	2014/09/27
23	Eduard Fedchuk	PG	1.82	73	1991	(Ukraine)	2014/09/27
24	Mykola Polyuliak	PG	1.92	84	1990	(Ukraine)	2014/09/27
32	Dmytro Tykhonov	F	2.04	114	1992	(Ukraine)	2013/10/08
43	Illia Zhukovskyi	F	1.98	82	1993	(Ukraine)	2014/10/06
Head coach: (Ukraine) Maksym Fomichov 2014/09/27 – 2014/11/26, 2015/01/02 – end of season
P. D. of Head coach: (Ukraine) Kyrylo Pohostinskyi 2014/11/26 – 2015/01/02
Playing coach: (Ukraine) Yaroslav Zubrytskyi

=== Season 2015–2016 ===
#	Name	Pos.	Height	Weight	Born	Nat.	Played from – to
6	Larry Hall	PG	1.90	97	1983	(United States)	2015/11/05 - 2016/02/26
11	Illia Shemosiuk	PG	1.88	87	1985	(Ukraine)	2015/11/05
23	Volodymyr Hurtovyi	C	2.08	106	1975	(Ukraine)	2015/11/05
21	Volodymyr Orlenko	C	2.15	120	1985	(Ukraine)	2015/11/05
10	Denys Tiutiunnyk	F	1.92	99	1992	(Ukraine)	2015/11/05
22	Viacheslau Skidan	C	2.05	120	1985	(Belarus)	2015/11/05
8	Maksym Tiutiunnyk	F	1.92	99	1992	(Ukraine)	2015/11/05
15	Mykhailo Nasennik	F	2.00	90	1983	(Ukraine)	2015/11/05
20	Omar Briggs	C	2.01	98	1989	(United States)	2015/11/05 - 2015/12/17
5	Vadym Onishenko	F	1.84	83	1989	(Ukraine)	2015/11/05
Head coach: (Ukraine) Kyrylo Pohostynskyi
