= Andriy Malysh =

Ukrainian basketball player

Personal information
- Born: 6 July 1983 (age 43) Kyiv, Ukraine
- Listed height: 6 ft 8 in (2.03 m)
- Listed weight: 237 lb (108 kg)

Career information
- NBA draft: 2005: undrafted
- Playing career: 2000–2018
- Position: Power forward

Career history
- 2000–2004: BC Kyiv
- 2004-2007: BC Budivelnyk
- 2007-2008: BC Sumyhimprom
- 2008-2009: BC Cherkaski Mavpy
- 2009–2012: BC Budivelnyk
- 2012-2013: BC Donetsk
- 2013–2014: BC Ferro-ZNTU
- 2014–2015: BC Dnipro
- 2015–2016: BC Budivelnyk
- 2016–2017: BC Borisfen
- 2017–2018: BC Kremin

Career highlights
- Ukrainian SuperLeague champion (2010, 2011); Ukrainian Cup (2012)

Andrij Malysh (born July 6, 1983) is a Ukrainian former professional basketball player.

He played at the 2002 FIBA Europe Under-20 Championship with the Ukrainian national junior team.
