= Oleksandr Sizov =

Ukrainian basketball player

Personal information
- Born: 16 June 1988 (age 38) Kharkiv, Ukrainian SSR, Soviet Union
- Listed height: 1.94 m (6 ft 4 in)

Career information
- Playing career: 2007–2022
- Position: Point guard

Career history
- 2007–2009: Khimik
- 2009–2010: BIPA Odesa
- 2011–2013: Khimik
- 2013–2014: MBC Mykolaiv
- 2014–2015: Dnipro
- 2015–2016: Cherkaski Mavpy
- 2017–2020: Dnipro
- 2020–2022: BC Zaporizhzhia

Career highlights
- Ukrainian Super League champion (2020); 2x Ukrainian Cup champion (2018, 2019)

Oleksandr Sizov (born 16 June 1988) is a Ukrainian former basketball player. He participated at the EuroBasket 2015.
