= 2014–15 Ukrainian Basketball SuperLeague =

Ukrainian SuperLeague
- Duration: October 11, 2014 – May 4, 2015
- Games played: 187
- Teams: 11

Regular season
- Season MVP: (Ukraine) Denys Lukashov

Finals
- Champions: Khimik (1st title)
- Runners-up: Dnipro
- Third place: Budivelnyk
- Fourth place: Kyiv
- Finals MVP: (United States) Derek Needham

Statistical leaders
Points	(Ukraine) Ruslan Otverchenko	20.8
Rebounds	(Ukraine) Maks Adam Konate	9.3
Assists	(United States) Cameron Randels	6.5

Records
- Biggest home win: Kyiv 112–48 Odesa (28 March 2015)
- Biggest away win: Kyiv 58–109 Khimik (30 March 2015)
- Highest scoring: Kyiv 124–98 Dnipro-Azot (22 February 2015)
- Winning streak: 36; Khimik
- Losing streak: 12; Politekhnika-Halychyna, Mykolaiv
- All statistics correct as of April 21, 2015.

The 2014–15 Ukrainian Basketball SuperLeague was the 24th edition of the Ukrainian top-tier basketball championship. The season started on October 11, 2014 and ended on May 4, 2015.

Because of the Russo-Ukrainian war, just 7 foreign players played in the league this season. BC Donetsk and BC Azovmash didn't participate this season.

In the regular season, Khimik took the top seed unbeaten with a 30–0 record, and eventually took the title after winning 36 games in a row.

== Regular season ==
=== Standings ===
Pos	Team	Pld	W	L	PF	PA	PD	Pts	Qualification
1	Khimik	30	30	0	2654	1856	+798	60	Qualification for semifinals
2	Budivelnyk	30	26	4	2458	1860	+598	56	Qualification for semifinals
3	Dnipro	30	19	11	2353	2081	+272	49	Qualification for quarterfinals
4	Kyiv	30	15	15	2332	2386	−54	45	Qualification for quarterfinals
5	Cherkaski Mavpy	30	15	15	2307	2410	−103	45	Qualification for quarterfinals
6	Ferro-ZNTU	30	15	15	2291	2472	−181	43	
7	Mykolaiv	30	11	19	2103	2353	−250	40	Qualification for quarterfinals
8	Hoverla Ivano-Frankivsk	30	11	19	2064	2142	−78	38	
9	Odesa	30	8	22	2239	2555	−316	36	
10	Politekhnika-Halychyna	30	7	23	2067	2474	−407	36	
11	Dnipro-Azot	30	8	22	2136	2415	−279	34	

Source: Superleague.ua

=== Results ===
==== Rounds 1-20 ====
Home \ Away	BUD	CHE	DNI	AZO	FER	HOV	KHI	KYI	MYK	ODE	POL
BC Budivelnyk		89–61	83–61	100–75	92–60	76–69	83–84	80–76	20–0	85–63	96–58
Cherkaski Mavpy	71–79		74–69	79–76	77–72	87–85	67–84	80–96	73–61	100–91	86–70
BC Dnipro	70–72	88–73		71–54	88–67	86–79	49–63	76–56	94–68	98–65	74–52
BC Dnipro-Azot	48–81	81–97	70–78		90–63	76–67	56–79	71–52	67–73	68–75	88–72
BC Ferro-ZNTU	90–83	100–87	83–68	89–76		89–78	56–78	75–80	79–77	84–83	73–70
Hoverla Ivano-Frankivsk	59–61	59–63	69–67	73–81	76–74		79–90	66–62	57–78	83–80	74–51
BC Khimik	77–71	79–62	76–68	104–56	106–63	76–65		95–64	92–46	90–56	98–54
BC Kyiv	48–90	74–83	78–71	94–65	84–81	72–69	73–77		106–81	75–86	98–64
MBC Mykolaiv	48–65	86–63	64–78	79–64	82–57	78–58	67–85	85–87		101–80	68–56
BC Odesa	68–82	77–81	72–77	77–89	76–109	90–71	75–87	100–81	84–92		75–69
BC Politekhnika-Halychyna	45–98	69–83	56–93	84–82	74–78	61–75	75–105	71–74	81–96	68–77	

Legend: Blue = home team win; Yellow = draw; Red = away team win.

==== Rounds 21-30 ====
Home \ Away	BUD	CHE	DNI	AZO	FER	HOV	KHI	KYI	MYK	ODE	POL
BC Budivelnyk			84–64			86–64	61–66	99–65		77–60	
Cherkaski Mavpy	49–77		83–85		73–77				95–77		84–76
BC Dnipro					93–63	71–67	60–69	85–53		104–74	
BC Dnipro-Azot	71–101	85–76	77–103						94–71		76–90
BC Ferro-ZNTU	57–101			89–74		83–66		74–78		70–80	
Hoverla Ivano-Frankivsk		76–64		20–0			57–79	85–84		70–57	
BC Khimik		100–71		76–53	116–56				104–42		114–57
BC Kyiv		83–75		124–98			58–109			112–48	69–77
MBC Mykolaiv	79–101		56–96		90–92	49–83		70–76			
BC Odesa		89–90		78–71			56–96		72–80		75–95
BC Politekhnika-Halychyna	45–85		77–68		76–88	71–65			94–59		

Legend: Blue = home team win; Yellow = draw; Red = away team win.

== Playoffs ==
Quarterfinals
4	Kyiv	3
5	Cherkaski Mavpy	1
3	Dnipro	3
7	Mykolaiv	0

Semifinals
1	Khimik	3
4	Kyiv	0
2	Budivelnyk	2
3	Dnipro	3

Finals
1	Khimik	3
3	Dnipro	0
Third place
2	Budivelnyk	3
4	Kyiv	1
