= Sergiy Gorbenko =

Ukrainian basketball player

Sergij Gorbenko
No. 10 – Budivelnyk Kyiv
- Position: Forward
- League: Ukrainian SuperLeague

Personal information
- Born: 30 July 1985 (age 41) Mykolaiv
- Listed height: 6 ft 8 in (2.03 m)
- Listed weight: 220 lb (100 kg)

Career information
- NBA draft: 2007: undrafted
- Playing career: 2000–present

Career history
- 2000–2003: Mykolaiv
- 2003–2005: Kyiv
- 2005–2010: Budivelnyk
- 2010–2012: Dnipro-Azot
- 2012–2014: Budivelnyk
- 2014–2015: Avangard
- 2015–present: Budivelnyk

Career highlights
- Global Games champion (2004); 4x Ukrainian League champion (2005, 2013, 2014, 2017); Ukrainian Cup champion (2014); UBL Cup champion (2009)

Sergij Gorbenko (Ukrainian: Сергій Горбенко; born July 30, 1985) is a Ukrainian professional basketball player for Budivelnyk Kyiv of the UA SuperLeague.

== Professional career ==
On September 17, 2015, Gorbenko signed a contract with BC Budivelnyk.
