= 2012–13 Ukrainian Basketball SuperLeague =

Ukrainian Basketball SuperLeague 2012–13
- League: Ukrainian SuperLeague
- Sport: Basketball
- Duration: September 28, 2012 – May 31, 2013
- Number of teams: 14
- TV partner(s): Sport 1, Sport 2

Season
- Top seed: Budivelnyk
- Season MVP: (United States) Malcolm Delaney (Budivelnyk)
- Top scorer: (United States) Randy Culpepper (Ferro-ZNTU)

Finals
- Champions: BC Budivelnyk
- Runners-up: BC Azovmash

Ukrainian Basketball SuperLeague seasons
- ← 2011–12 2013–14 →

The 2012–13 Ukrainian Basketball SuperLeague was the 22nd edition of the Ukrainian top-tier basketball championship. The season has started on 28 September 2012 and ended on 31 May 2013. BC Budivelnyk won the Ukrainian championship by beating BC Azovmash 4–3 in the Finals. Ferro-ZNTU ended on the third place.

== Participants ==
Team	Home city	Stadium	Capacity
BC Azovmash	Mariupol	Azovmash Sports Palace	3,000
BC Budivelnyk	Kyiv	Merydian Sports Complex	1,500
Cherkaski Mavpy	Cherkasy	Budivelnyk Sports Palace	1,500
BC Dnipro	Dnipropetrovsk	Meteor Sports Palace	6,500
BC Dnipro-Azot	Dniprodzerzhynsk	Mykhaylo Anoshkin Tennis Palace	1,000
BC Donetsk	Donetsk	Druzhba Sports Palace	4,700
BC Ferro-ZNTU	Zaporizhzhia	ZAS Sports Palace	1,200
BC Hoverla	Ivano-Frankivsk	CPE Manezh	1,500
BC Khimik	Yuzhne	Olimp Physical Culture and Sports Complex	2,000
BC Kryvbasbasket	Kryvyy Rih	KTU Sports Complex	1,300
BC Kyiv	Kyiv	Merydian Sports Complex	1,500
MBC Mykolaiv	Mykolaiv	Nadezhda Sports Palace	2,000
BC Odesa	Odesa	Krayan Sports Complex	1,500
BC Politekhnika-Halychyna	Lviv	Halychyna Sports Palace	1,200

== Regular season ==
	Team	GP	W	L	PF	PA	Qualification
1	Budivelnyk	39	28	11	3204	2922	Qualified for the Playoffs
2	Ferro-ZNTU	39	25	14	3377	3232	Qualified for the Playoffs
3	Azovmash	39	25	14	3204	3054	Qualified for the Playoffs
4	Khimik	39	24	15	3102	3040	Qualified for the Playoffs
5	Politekhnika-Halychyna	39	24	15	3072	2961	Qualified for the Playoffs
6	BC Donetsk	39	23	16	3095	2926	Qualified for the Playoffs
7	Cherkaski Mavpy	39	21	18	3047	2935	Qualified for the Playoffs
8	Hoverla	39	21	18	3074	3024	Qualified for the Playoffs
9	Kryvbasbasket	39	17	22	2930	2990	–
10	MBC Mykolaiv	39	16	23	2911	3036	–
11	Dnipro	39	15	24	2911	3052	–
12	BC Odesa	39	14	25	2990	3165	–
13	Dnipro-Azot	39	11	28	2894	3165	–
14	BC Kyiv	39	9	30	2739	3048	–

== Playoffs ==
=== Bracket ===
Quarterfinals
1	Budivelnyk	4
8	Hoverla	1
4	Khimik	0
5	Politekhnika-Halychyna	4
2	Ferro-ZNTU	4
7	Cherkaski Mavpy	1
3	Azovmash	4
6	Donetsk	1

Semifinals
1	Budivelnyk	4
5	Politekhnika-Halychyna	0
2	Ferro-ZNTU	0
3	Azovmash	4

Finals
1	Budivelnyk	4
3	Azovmash	3
Third place
2	Ferro-ZNTU	4
5	Politekhnika-Halychyna	0

=== Quarterfinals ===
- Budivelnyk - Hoverla 4–1 (85:82, 96:59, 95:102, 78:77, 101:97 OT)
- Khimik - Politekhnika-Halychyna 0–4 (81:87, 75:82, 73:77, 56:76)
- Ferro-ZNTU - Cherkaski Mavpy 4–1 (88:83, 93:89 OT, 83:76, 85:87, 94:83)
- Azovmash - Donetsk 4–1 (102:93, 82:74, 97:96 OT, 49:83, 97:96 OT)

=== Semifinals ===
- Budivelnyk - Politekhnika-Halychyna 4–0 (73:56, 77:67, 80:65, 69:56)
- Ferro-ZNTU - Azovmash 0–4 (63:82, 73:79, 79:86, 89:93)

=== Third place ===
- Ferro-ZNTU - Politekhnika-Halychyna 4–0 (97:79, 102:89, 94:73, 87:67)

=== Final ===
- Budivelnyk - Azovmash 4–3 (89:82, 73:77, 74:86, 80:63, 89:75, 95:96, 82:70)

== Awards ==
=== MVP ===
- (United States) Malcolm Delaney – Budivelnyk

=== All-Superleague team ===
Position	Player	Team
PG	(United States) Lynn Greer	Azovmash
SG	(United States) Malcolm Delaney	Budivelnyk
SF	(Ukraine) Artur Drozdov	Budivelnyk
PF	(United States) Leo Lyons	Budivelnyk
C	(Serbia) Vladan Vukosavljević	Polytekhnika-Halychyna

== Statistical leaders ==
=== Points ===
Rank	Name	Team	PPG
1	(United States) Randy Culpepper	Ferro-ZNTU	21.6
2	(United States) Kyndall Dyker	Hoverla	17.5
3	(United States) Lynn Greer	Azovmash	17.3
4	(United States) Anthony Goods	Kyiv	17.2
5	(United States) Charles Thomas	Cherkaski Mavpy	16.9

=== Rebounds ===
Rank	Name	Team	RPG
1	(Serbia) Vladan Vukosavljević	Politekhnika-Halychyna	10.5
2	(United States) Cameron Moore	Ferro-ZNTU	9.0
3	(United States) Jarrod Jones	Kyiv	8.5
4	(United States) Alan Wiggins	Dnipro-Azot	8.0
5	(United States) Callistus Eziukwu	Kryvbas	7.9

=== Assists ===
Rank	Name	Team	APG
1	(United States) Lynn Greer	Azovmash	7.1
2	(United States) Derrick Low	Dnipro	6.9
3	(United States) James Florence	Kryvbas	6.3
4	(United States) Eugene Lawrence	Hoverla	6.2
5	(United States) Willie Deane	Khimik	6.0

== Ukrainian clubs in European competitions ==
Team	Competition	Progress
Budivelnyk	EuroCup	Semifinal
Azovmash	EuroCup	Regular season
Donetsk	EuroCup	Regular season
Khimik	EuroChallenge	Quarterfinal

== Ukrainian clubs in Regional competitions ==
Team	Competition	Progress
Donetsk	VTB United League	Eightfinals
Azovmash	VTB United League	Regular season
