= Denys Lukashov =

Ukrainian basketball player

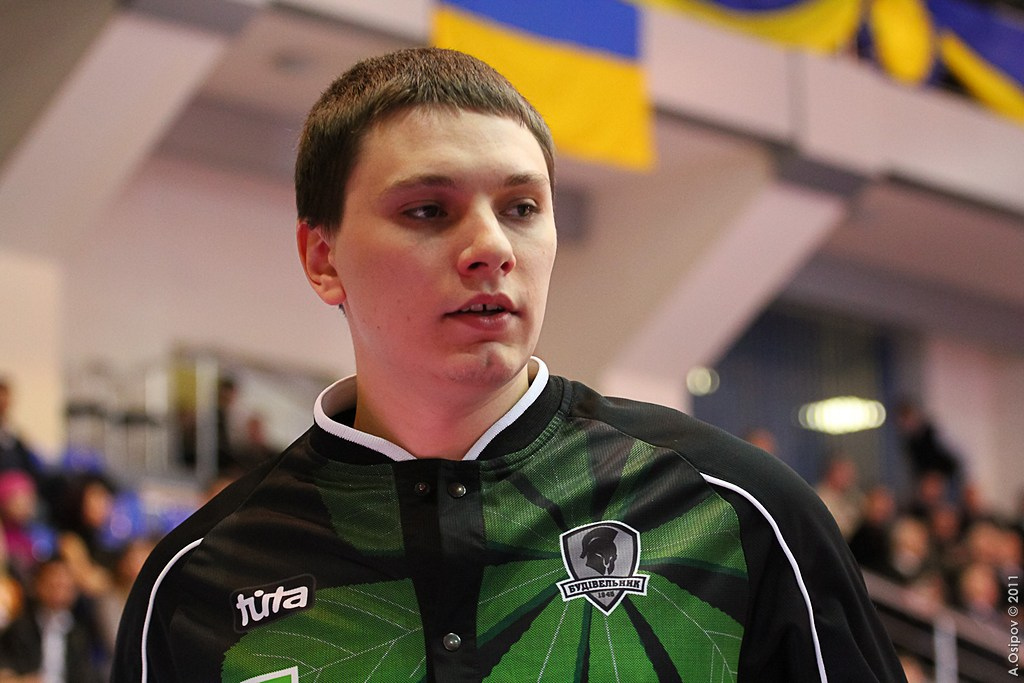
- Lukashov for Budivelnyk in 2010

Free agent
- Position: Point guard / shooting guard

Personal information
- Born: April 30, 1989 (age 37) Donetsk, Ukrainian SSR, Soviet Union
- Listed height: 1.88 m (6 ft 2 in)
- Listed weight: 82 kg (181 lb)

Career information
- NBA draft: 2011: undrafted
- Playing career: 2008–present

Career history
- 2008–2010: Kyiv
- 2010–2011: Budivelnyk
- 2012–2013: Donetsk
- 2013–2014: Azovmash
- 2014–2015: Budivelnyk
- 2015–2016: Avtodor Saratov
- 2016: Lietuvos rytas
- 2016–2017: Enisey
- 2017–2018: Vytautas
- 2018–2019: Enisey
- 2019–2024: Prometey
- 2024–2025: Peja
- 2026: Rīgas Zeļļi

Career highlights
- Ukrainian SuperLeague MVP (2015); King Mindaugas Cup champion (2016)

Denys Lukashov (born 30 April 1989) is a Ukrainian professional basketball player who most recently played for Rīgas Zeļļi of the Latvian–Estonian Basketball League (LEBL). He is a member of the Ukrainian national team, where he participated at the EuroBasket 2015. On October 31, 2024, Lukashov signed for the Kosovan club KB Peja.

== Honours ==
=== Club ===
Budivelnyk Kyiv

- Ukrainian Cup: 2010–11

Lietuvos rytas

- Lithuanian Cup: 2016

=== Individual ===
- Ukrainian SuperLeague MVP: 2014–15
