= Maksym Zvonov =

Ukrainian basketball player

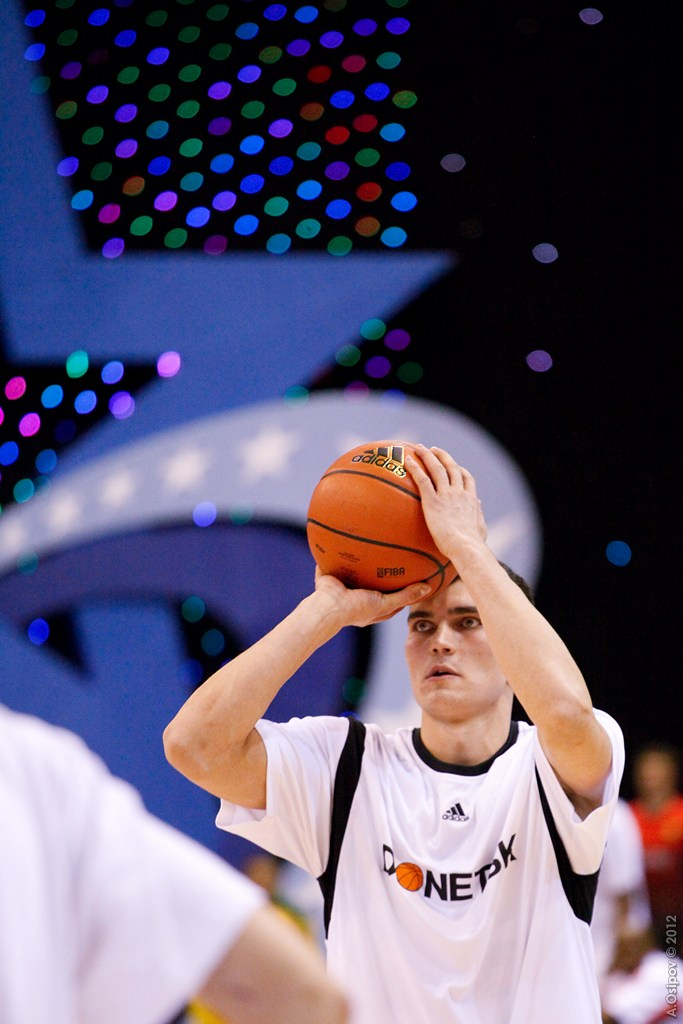

Personal information
- Born: April 16, 1987 (age 39) Bila Tserkva, Ukrainian SSR, Soviet Union
- Listed height: 6 ft 7 in (2.01 m)
- Listed weight: 215 lb (98 kg)

Career information
- Playing career: 2004–2022
- Position: Forward

Career history
- 2004–2010: Kyiv
- 2010–2011: Azovmash
- 2011–2013: Donetsk
- 2013–2014: Azovmash
- 2014–2015: Budivelnyk
- 2015: Dynamo Kyiv
- 2015–2016: BCM U Pitești
- 2016–2017: U-BT Cluj-Napoca
- 2017–2018: Canton Charge
- 2018–2019: Dynamo Odesa
- 2019–2020: Kyiv-Basket
- 2021–2022: Budivelnyk

Career highlights
- Ukrainian Basketball SuperLeague champion (2012); Romanian League champion (2017); Romanian Cup winner (2017); Ukrainian Cup winner (2015, 2021); Ukrainian Cup Final Four MVP (2015)

Maksym Zvonov (Ukrainian: Максим Звонов; born Maksym Pustozvonov Ukrainian: Максим Пустозвонов; born April 16, 1987) is a Ukrainian former professional basketball player. He represented the Ukraine national basketball team.

In 2021, he began playing under the surname Zvonov after changing his family name from Pustozvonov.

== Professional career ==
=== Ukraine ===
Born in Bila Tserkva, Zvonov began his basketball career in the Ukrainian Basketball SuperLeague, first with the second division team became a champion and then first division of BC Kyiv from 2004 to 2010. In 2010 was nominated “Best progressive player of the league”.

From 2010 to 2011 he played for BC Azovmash. He was named MVP of the 5th round of the VTB United League group stage in the 2010–11 season.

In 2011, he joined the team of BC Donetsk, where he spent two seasons and became a champion of Ukraine in 2012.

In 2013, he came back to BC Azovmash for one year.

In August 2014, he signed with the BC Budivelnyk for the 2014–2015 season.

In March 2015, he was named the Ukrainian Cup Final Four MVP, after winning the Cup with Budivelnyk.

In September 2018, he signed with the BC Dynamo Odesa for the 2018–2019 season. With him Odesa advanced to the Cup Final and he was shooting over 50% from 3 point line in the National championship (best in a league).

In August 2019, he signed with the Kyiv-Basket for the 2019–2020 season and again finished the season with the best percentage in league from 3 point line (over 48%).

On 1 February 2020, he won the three-point contest at the SuperLeague All-Star event.

In January 2021, he returned to Budivelnyk and played under the surname Zvonov. Budivelnyk won the Ukrainian Cup in April 2021.

During his career five times he was selected for National super league All Star Games.

=== Romania ===
In October 2015, Zvonov signed with the BCM U Pitești for the 2015–2016 season, where he finished his season as a best 3 point shooter of the National league with over 56%.

In the 2016–17 season he played for Romanian team U-BT Cluj-Napoca. The club won the Romanian national championship in 2017. U-BT also won the Romanian Cup in 2017.

=== NBA G League ===
Zvonov was selected 17th overall in the 2017 NBA G League Draft by the Memphis Hustle.

He played for the Canton Charge in the NBA G League during the 2017–18 season. In March 2018, the Charge waived him.

== National team career ==
Zvonov was a member of the Ukraine national basketball team at the 2014 FIBA Basketball World Cup and multiple editions of EuroBasket.

== Personal life ==
In March 2021, Zvonov said he changed his surname after researching his family tree and returning to the earlier family name Zvonov.
