= 2011–12 Ukrainian Basketball SuperLeague =

Ukrainian Basketball SuperLeague 2011-12
- League: Ukrainian Basketball SuperLeague
- Sport: Basketball
- Duration: October 1, 2011 – May 25, 2012

Regular season
- Top seed: Donetsk
- Season MVP: (United States) Ramel Curry (Donetsk)

Finals
- Champions: BC Donetsk
- Runners-up: Azovmash Mariupol

Ukrainian Basketball SuperLeague seasons
- ← 2010–11 2012–13 →

The Ukrainian Basketball SuperLeague 2011-2012 (UBL) was the 21st edition of the professional league. The Ukrainian Basketball SuperLeague (USL) (Ukrainian: Українська баскетбольна суперліга) is the first-tier level of professional basketball league in Ukraine established in 1992.

The season started on 1 October 2011 and ended 25 May 2012. BC Donetsk won the championship title for the first time.

== Participants ==
Team	Home city	Stadium	Capacity
BC Azovmash	Mariupol	Azovmash Sports Palace	3,000
BC Budivelnyk	Kyiv	Merydian Sports Complex	1,500
BC Cherkaski Mavpy	Cherkasy	Budivelnyk Sports Palace	1,500
BC Dnipro	Dnipro	Meteor Sports Palace	6,500
BC Dnipro-Azot	Dniprodzerzhynsk	Mykhaylo Anoshkin Tennis Palace	1,000
BC Donetsk	Donetsk	Druzhba Sports Palace	4,700
BC Ferro-ZNTU	Zaporizhya	ZAS Sports Palace	1,200
BC Hoverla	Ivano-Frankivsk	CPE Manezh	1,500
BC Khimik	Yuzhne	Olimp Physical Culture and Sports Complex	2,000
BC Kryvbasbasket	Kryvyy Rih	KTU Sports Complex	1,300
BC Kyiv	Kyiv	Merydian Sports Complex	1,500
MBC Mykolaiv	Mykolaiv	Nadezhda Sports Palace	2,000
BC Odesa	Odesa	Krayan Sports Complex	1,500
BC Politekhnika-Halychyna	Lviv	Halychyna Sports Palace	1,200

== Regular season ==
	Team	Pld	W	L	PF	PA	Qualification
1	BC Donetsk	39	31	8	3279	2944	Qualified for the Playoffs
2	BC Budivelnyk	39	30	9	3154	2993	Qualified for the Playoffs
3	Azovmash Mariupol	39	26	13	3207	2949	Qualified for the Playoffs
4	Khimik	39	23	16	3180	3112	Qualified for the Playoffs
5	Ferro-ZNTU	39	23	16	3327	3172	Qualified for the Playoffs
6	Hoverla	39	22	17	2954	2944	Qualified for the Playoffs
7	BC Odesa	39	22	17	3276	3228	Qualified for the Playoffs
8	BC Dnipro	39	21	18	3159	3001	Qualified for the Playoffs
9	BC Kyiv	39	21	18	3122	3083	
10	Kryvbasbasket	39	15	24	3086	3296	
11	Dnipro-Azot	39	12	27	3091	3301	
12	MBC Mykolaiv	39	11	28	3031	3236	
13	Cherkasy	39	8	31	2906	3221	
14	Halychyna	39	8	31	3057	3349	

== Playoffs ==
Quarter Finals
1	BC Donetsk	3
8	BC Dnipro	1
4	BC Khimik	0
5	Ferro-ZNTU	3
2	BC Budivelnyk	3
7	BC Odesa	2
3	Azovmash Mariupol	3
6	Hoverla	1

Semifinals
1	BC Donetsk	4
5	Ferro-ZNTU	2
2	BC Budivelnyk	0
3	Azovmash Mariupol	4

Finals
1	BC Donetsk	4
3	Azovmash Mariupol	0
Third place
2	BC Budivelnyk	1
5	Ferro-ZNTU	3

== Awards ==
=== MVP ===
- Ramel Curry – BC Donetsk

=== All-Superleague team ===
Position	Player	Team
PG	(United States) Ramel Curry	BC Donetsk
SG	(United States) Randy Culpepper	Ferro-ZNTU
SF	(United States) Matthew Walsh	Azovmash
PF	(United States) Richard Guinn	Ferro-ZNTU
C	(Ukraine) Vyacheslav Kravtsov	BC Donetsk

== Ukrainian clubs in European competitions ==
Team	Competition	Progress
Donetsk	EuroCup	Quarterfinals
Azovmash	EuroCup	Regular season
Goverla	EuroChallenge	Regular season
Khimik	EuroChallenge	Regular season

== Ukrainian clubs in Regional competitions ==
Team	Competition	Progress
Budivelnyk	VTB United League	Regular season
Azovmash	VTB United League	Regular season
Dnipro	VTB United League	Qualifying round
