= Vyacheslav Bobrov =

Ukrainian basketball player

No. 67 – Stal Ostrów Wielkopolski
- Position: Power forward / Center
- League: PLK

Personal information
- Born: 19 September 1992 (age 34) Donetsk, Ukraine
- Listed height: 6 ft 8 in (2.03 m)
- Listed weight: 224 lb (102 kg)

Career information
- NBA draft: 2014: undrafted

Career history
- 2009–2011: Azovmash Mariupol
- 2011–2015: Kyiv
- 2015–2016: BCM U Pitești
- 2016–2017: UJAP Quimper
- 2017–2018: Pieno žvaigždės
- 2018–2019: Gipuzkoa Basket
- 2019–2020: Fuenlabrada
- 2020–2022: Dnipro
- 2022: Nanterre 92
- 2022–2023: BC Budivelnyk
- 2023–2024: Prometey
- 2024–2025: VEF Rīga
- 2025–2026: Dinamo București
- 2026–present: Stal Ostrów Wielkopolski

Career highlights
- LBL champion (2025); 2x Latvian-Estonian League champion (2024, 2025); Latvian–Estonian Basketball League Final MVP (2025); Latvian Basketball Cup winner (2025)

Vyacheslav Bobrov (born 19 September 1992) is a Ukrainian basketball player for Stal Ostrów Wielkopolski of the Polish Basketball League (PLK). He also plays for the Ukrainian national team.

== Professional career ==
During the 2019–20 season, Bobrov averaged 7.4 points and 3.2 rebounds per game in the Liga ACB. On 30 May 2020 he signed a two-year extension with Fuenlabrada.

Bobrov subsequently joined BC Dnipro of the Ukrainian Basketball Super League. He averaged 9.4 points, 5.7 rebounds, and 1.0 assist per game during the 2021–22 season.

On 28 February 2022, Bobrov signed with Nanterre 92 of the LNB Pro A.

On August 1, 2022, he has signed with BC Budivelnyk of the European North Basketball League.

On August 6, 2024, he signed with VEF Rīga of the Latvian–Estonian Basketball League.

== National team career ==
Bobrov participated at the EuroBasket in 2017 and 2022.
