= Olexandr Nerush =

Ukrainian basketball player

Oleksandr Nerush
No. 11 – BC Budivelnyk
- Position: Small forward / power forward
- League: UA SuperLeague; Euroleague

Personal information
- Born: 17 January 1983 (age 43) Kiev
- Listed height: 6 ft 4 in (1.93 m)
- Listed weight: 211 lb (96 kg)

Career information
- NBA draft: 2005: undrafted
- Playing career: 1999–present

Career history
- 1999–2008: BC Budivelnyk
- 2008: BC Pulsar
- 2010-2011: BC Dnipro-Azot
- 2011-2013: BC Cherkaski Mavpy
- 2013–present: BC Budivelnyk

Career highlights
- UBL Cup (2009); Ukrainian Cup (2010)

Oleksandr Nerush (born 17 January 1983) - was a Ukrainian professional basketball player for BC Budivelnyk of the UA SuperLeague.
