= 2015–16 Ukrainian Basketball SuperLeague =

Ukrainian Basketball SuperLeague
- Duration: 31 October 2015 – 12 March 2016
- Teams: 8

Finals
- Champions: Dnipro (1st title)
- Runners-up: Budivelnyk

Statistical leaders
Points	(Ukraine) Illya Shemosiuk	17.5
Rebounds	(Ukraine) Victor Ljuldjuraj	10.3
Assists	(United States) Larry Hall	7.5

The 2015–16 Ukrainian Basketball SuperLeague was the 2015–16 edition of the Ukrainian basketball championship. The season started on October 10, 2015.

The original top-tier Ukrainian SuperLeague was split in two before the season began, after eight teams from the league created the new Ukrainian SL Favorit Sport.

== Teams ==
Team	City	Arena
Budivelnyk	Kyiv	Kyiv Sports Palace
Dnipro	Mykolaiv	Palace of Sports Meteor
Hoverla	Ivano-Frankivsk	College of Physical Education
Kharkiv	Kharkiv	
Khortytsia	Zaporizhzhia	
Kremin	Kremenchuk	
Odesa	Odesa	Palace of Sport
Politekhnika-Halychyna	Lviv	SP Halychyna

== Regular season ==
Pos	Team	Pld	W	L	PF	PA	PD	Pts	Qualification or relegation
1	Dnipro	14	13	1	1187	875	+312	27	Qualification to playoffs
2	Budivelnyk	14	11	3	1191	993	+198	25	Qualification to playoffs
3	Politekhnika-Halychyna	14	8	6	1160	1103	+57	22	Qualification to playoffs
4	Kremin	14	8	6	1164	1147	+17	22	Qualification to playoffs
5	Hoverla	14	7	7	1079	1072	+7	21	Qualification to playoffs
6	Kharkiv	14	6	8	1113	1176	−63	20	Qualification to playoffs
7	Khortytsia	14	2	12	1040	1254	−214	16	Qualification to playoffs
8	Odesa	14	1	13	946	1260	−314	15	Qualification to playoffs

Source: Flashscore

== Playoffs ==
Quarterfinals
1	Dnipro	2
8	Odesa	0
4	Kremin	2
5	Hoverla	1
2	Budivelnyk	2
7	Khortytsia	0
3	Politekhnika-Halychyna	2
6	Kharkiv	1

Semifinals
1	Dnipro	2
4	Kremin	0
2	Budivelnyk	2
3	Politekhnika-Halychyna	0

Finals
1	Dnipro	3
2	Budivelnyk	0

== Ukrainian clubs in European competitions ==
Team	Competition	Progress
Khimik	FIBA Europe Cup	Quarterfinals
