= Nerush =

Nerush (Russian: Неруш) is a surname. Notable people with the surname include:

- Nikolay Nerush (born 1960), Russian rugby union coach
- Olexandr Nerush (born 1983), Ukrainian basketball player
