= Horbenko =

Horbenko or Gorbenko (Ukrainian: Горбенко) is a Ukrainian surname. Notable people with the surname include:

- Anastasia Gorbenko (born 2003), Israeli swimmer
- Hennadiy Horbenko (1975–2025), Ukrainian hurdler
- Ihor Horbenko, Ukrainian Paralympic athlete
- Leonid Gorbenko (1939–2010), Russian politician
- Natalia Gorbenko (born 1970), Ukrainian figure skater
- Sergiy Gorbenko (born 1985), Ukrainian basketball player
- Svitlana Horbenko (born 1985), Ukrainian Paralympic athlete
