= Andriy Myronenko =

Ukrainian basketball player

No. 13 – Keila Coolbet
- Position: Forward
- League: Ukrainian Basketball Super League

Personal information
- Born: 8 December 1994 (age 30); Ukraine
- Listed height: 6 ft 6 in (1.98 m)

Career information
- NBA draft: 2016: undrafted
- Playing career: 2012–present

Career history
- 2012–2019: Dnipro
- 2019–2020: Zaporizhya
- 2020–2022: Khimik
- 2022–present: Keila Coolbet

Andrij Myronenko (born 8 December 1994) is a Ukrainian professional basketball player, who most recently played for Keila Coolbet of the Latvian-Estonian Basketball League.

With BC Dnipro, Myronenko won the SuperLeague Cup in 2016, the first in his career.
