= Valerii Kondratiev =

- Валерій Валерійович Кондратьєв
- Born: Valerii Valeriiovych Kondratiev; 28 August 1970 (age 55); Dnipropetrovsk, Ukrainian SSR
- Other name: Gastello
- Citizenship: Ukraine
- Occupations: crime boss, sports executive

Valerii Valeriiovych Kondratiev (Ukrainian: Валерій Валерійович Кондратьєв; born 28 August 1970, Dnipropetrovsk) is a Ukrainian public person and sports executive. He is the president of BC Dnipro, the head of the Basketball Federation of Dnipropetrovsk Oblast, and a former vice-president of the Basketball Federation of Ukraine.

== Early life ==
Valerii Kondratiev was born on 28 August 1970 in Dnipro.

The era of Gorbachev's "Perestroika" — the late 80s — became for Kondratiev a kind of start in career. And at the same time he came to the attention of the police. In the late 80s, the police of the central Dnipro market "Ozerka" recorded a group of young sportsmen who were cheating with the help of the then popular game "Thimbles". The head of the group was Oleksandr Petrovskyi, nicknamed Narik.

The group of thimbles, in addition to Valerii Kondratiev nicknamed Gastello, according to police reports, included young judokas and boxers — Dato Suladze (nicknamed Dato), Sasha Yevtushenko, Oleh Panasenko, Roma Shovkoplyas (Roma Lugansky), Bohdan Gulyamov (Bodia), Valera Gulyaev (Slon), Serhiy Oliynyk (Umka), Sasha Lisovenko, Sasha Kavdax (Shtrek) and Albert Koleskor (Durdyonok).

Many of the former young "fighters", including Valerii Kondratiev, became businessmen, philanthropists, and partners of Oleksandr Petrovskyi in commercial activities decades later.

Valerii Kondratiev is the president of the BC Dnipro, the head of the Basketball Federation of Dnipropetrovsk Oblast, and was also the vice president of the Basketball Federation of Ukraine.

In 2019, he was named one of the top 30 most influential people in Dnipro by The New Voice of Ukraine.

== Investigations ==
=== Relations with Kolomoyskyi ===
The Ukrainian sports media Tribuna calls Valerii Kondratiev a long-time business partner of oligarch Ihor Kolomoyskyi. The investigation states that the BC Dnipro has several legal entities — BSC Dnipro and BC Dnipro — whose ultimate beneficiary is Kolomoyskyi. The trail of the oligarch is also specifically indicated by the fact that, along with Kondratiev, the beneficiary of BSC Dnipro is a Cypriot Andreas Sofoleous, who is listed in BC Budivelnyk's beneficiary company, BUDIVELNYK PROPERTIES INC.

=== Suspicion of money laundering ===
According to an investigation by Dnipro journalists, Kondratiev is the formal president of BC Dnipro, as he uses this position to launder money. According to the journalists, under the leadership of Valerii Kondratiev, in 2022, BC Dnipro suffered a loss of UAH 60.4 thousand in financial results.

== Controversies ==
=== Death threats to referees ===
In December 2019, Valeriy Kondratiev, together with Ihor Kolomoyskyi, threatened and intimidated a referee of a Ukrainian Basketball SuperLeague match. The incident occurred during a match between BC Dnipro and BC Kyiv-Basket.

After the regular season match of the Ukrainian Basketball SuperLeague between BC Dnipro and BC Kyiv-Basket (75:78), Valerii Kondratiev, as well as Ihor Kolomoyskyi and Valerii Guliaev, threatened the team of referees, in particular the chief referee of the match, Andriy Babyk, according to his report published by the Basketball Federation of Ukraine, on the way to the referee's room, he was approached by three people with threats.

As a result, the Basketball Federation of Ukraine decided to suspend the president of the Dnipro club for two games and to fine him: BC Dnipro for 32 thousand hryvnias, and Kondratiev for 20 thousand hryvnias.

=== Offences ===
In December 2021, the Basketball Federation of Ukraine fined Valerii Kondratiev for violating a number of issues related to the conduct and organisation of the Ukrainian Basketball SuperLeague.

According to Ukrainian media, he is part of the Narik group, headed by mafia boss Oleksandr Petrovskyi, and he is an associate of oligarch Ihor Kolomoyskyi.
