= Malysh (disambiguation) =

Malysh is a Russian surname literally meaning "little one".

Malysh may also refer to:

- Malysh Mountain, Antarctica
- OTs-21 Malysh, Russian pistol
