= Larry Hall =

Larry Hall may refer to:

- Larry Hall (singer), American singer
- Larry Hall (politician), member of the North Carolina House of Representatives
- Larry Hall (basketball), American basketball player
- Larry Hall (criminal), American kidnapper, rapist, murderer, and suspected serial killer

== See also ==
- Lawrence Hall (disambiguation)
