= Pavlo Krutous =

Ukrainian basketball player

No. 12 – Club Melilla Baloncesto
- Position: Small forward
- League: Primera FEB

Personal information
- Born: 9 April 1992 (age 34) Bila Tserkva, Ukraine
- Listed height: 1.94 m (6 ft 4 in)

Career information
- Playing career: 2010–present

Career history
- 2010–2015: BC Kyiv
- 2015–2017: Budivelnyk
- 2017–2018: BC Kalev
- 2018–2021: Kyiv-Basket
- 2022–2023: Budivelnyk
- 2023–2024: SCMU Craiova
- 2024–present: Club Melilla Baloncesto

Pavlo Krutous (born 9 April 1992) is a Ukrainian basketball player for Club Melilla Baloncesto of the Spanish Primera FEB. He has also represented the Ukrainian national team, with which he participated in the EuroBasket 2015.

After playing for several Ukrainian basketball clubs, including BC Budivelnyk, BC Kyiv and Kyiv-Basket, he joined SCMU Craiova of the Romanian Liga Națională in 2023. In August 2024, he signed for Club Melilla Baloncesto of the Spanish Primera FEB, the second tier of Spanish basketball.
