= Darjuš Lavrinovič =

Lithuanian basketball player (born 1979)

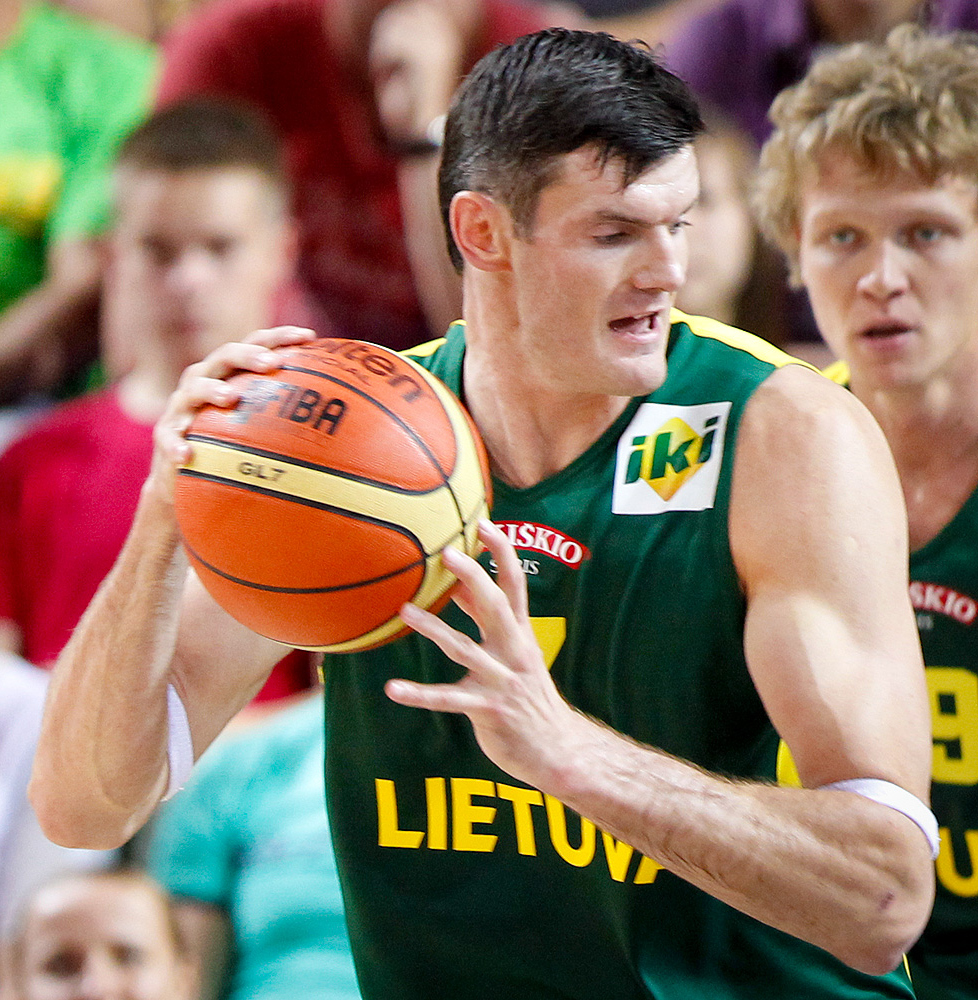
- Lavrinovič with Lithuania in 2014

Personal information
- Born: 1 November 1979 (age 47) Vilnius, Lithuania
- Listed height: 212 cm (6 ft 11 in)
- Listed weight: 110 kg (243 lb)

Career information
- NBA draft: 2001: undrafted
- Playing career: 1996–2022

Career history
- 1996–2003: Alita Alytus
- 2003–2006: Žalgiris
- 2006–2008: UNICS
- 2008–2009: Dynamo Moscow
- 2009–2010: Real Madrid
- 2010–2011: Fenerbahçe
- 2011–2012: CSKA Moscow
- 2012–2013: Žalgiris
- 2013–2014: Budivelnyk
- 2014–2016: Reggiana
- 2016–2018: Lietkabelis
- 2018–2019: BC SkyCop Prienai
- 2019–2020: London City Royals
- 2020–2022: BC Vytis

Career highlights
- LKL MVP (2006); BBL regular season MVP (2006); All-EuroLeague Second Team (2006); EuroLeague Blocks Leader (2006); Lithuanian League All-Star Game Co-MVP (2013); Ukrainian SuperLeague MVP (2014); Ukrainian Cup MVP (2014); All-EuroCup Second Team (2014)

Darjuš Lavrinovič (Polish: Dariusz Ławrynowicz, born 1 November 1979) is a Lithuanian former professional basketball player. At 2.12 m (6 ft 11 1/2 in) in height, he played primarily at the center position. He was also a member of the Lithuanian national basketball team. Lavrinovič was an All-EuroLeague Second Team selection in 2006.

== Professional career ==
Darjuš Lavrinovič blossomed in the EuroLeague 2005–06 season while playing with Žalgiris Kaunas, as he earned an All-EuroLeague Second Team selection. He was a rebounding monster that year, claiming the league rebounding crown in both the LKL and the Baltic League, averaging 9.8 rebounds per game in each competition. He joined Real Madrid in 2009. The following year, he was transferred to Fenerbahçe. In 2011, he signed a two-year contract with CSKA Moscow.

On 30 August 2013 he signed with Budivelnyk Kyiv.

On 31 July 2014 Darjuš officially joined Grissin Bon Reggio Emilia in the Italian Serie A. Despite missing the start of the season because of an injury, he contributed 11.4 points in around 17 minutes per game over 25 league games, before scoring in double figures in 10 of 15 playoff games he played in as Reggio Emilia only conceded the title on game 7 of the finals to Game 7 of the Italian League finals.

On 22 August 2018 Lavrinovič signed with BC Prienai of the Lithuanian Basketball League.

On 21 September 2019 he signed with the London City Royals of the British Basketball League.

On 19 January 2020 he signed with BC Vytis of the National Basketball League.

== National team career ==
Lavrinovič has also been a member of the senior Lithuanian national basketball team. With Lithuania's national team he has played at the EuroBasket 2005, the 2006 FIBA World Championship, the EuroBasket 2007, the 2008 Summer Olympics, the EuroBasket 2009, the EuroBasket 2013 and the 2014 FIBA World Cup. He helped Lithuania win the silver medal at the EuroBasket 2013 and the bronze medal at the EuroBasket 2007.

== Personal life ==
Lavrinovič is ethnically Polish. Lavrinovič has a twin-brother, Kšyštof, whom he played with at UNICS Kazan in the Russian Superleague, as well as with on the senior men's Lithuanian national basketball team. On 18 October 1998 Darjuš Lavrinovič, his twin-brother Kšyštof and their cousin raped at that time a seventeen-year-old girl. On 25 June 1999 the court sentenced the twin brothers to 5 years in prison and the cousin to 6 years in prison.

== Career statistics ==
Legend
GP	Games played	GS	Games started	MPG	Minutes per game
FG%	Field-goal percentage	3P%	3-point field-goal percentage	FT%	Free-throw percentage
RPG	Rebounds per game	APG	Assists per game	SPG	Steals per game
BPG	Blocks per game	PPG	Points per game	PIR	Performance index rating
**Bold**	Career high

Led the league

=== EuroLeague ===
Year	Team	GP	GS	MPG	FG%	3P%	FT%	RPG	APG	SPG	BPG	PPG	PIR
2003–04	Žalgiris	2	1	17.5	.571	.333	**1.000**	2.5	1.0	.0	1.5	11.5	12.5
2004–05	Žalgiris	14	2	15.3	.536	.316	.692	4.1	.1	.4	1.4	7.0	8.1
2005–06	Žalgiris	20	15	27.3	.516	.379	.681	**8.3**	**1.9**	.8	**2.1**	14.7	18.7
2009–10	Real Madrid	20	10	20.0	**.577**	**.412**	.739	4.5	1.2	**1.0**	.9	11.1	14.5
2010–11	Fenerbahçe	16	**16**	21.7	.426	.226	.778	4.4	1.3	.8	.9	8.0	9.6
2011–12	CSKA	15	1	12.4	.434	.300	.857	2.7	.5	.5	.3	4.7	4.5
2012–13	Žalgiris	**21**	10	19.7	.511	.333	.707	3.8	1.0	.7	.4	8.9	9.9
2013–14	Budivelnyk	10	10	**30.0**	.557	.406	.882	5.4	1.8	**1.0**	1.4	**15.1**	**19.5**
Career		118	67	20.8	.516	.342	.751	4.8	1.2	.7	1.0	10.0	12.0

== Honours ==
=== Individual ===
- LKL
  - LKL MVP: 2006
- All-EuroLeague Team
  - Second Team: 2005–06
- Lithuanian League All-Star Game:
  - MVP: 2013
- Ukrainian SuperLeague
  - MVP: 2013–14
- Ukrainian Cup
  - MVP: 2014
- All-EuroCup Team
  - Second Team: 2013–14

=== Team ===
==== International ====
- EuroBasket
  - 2007 Spain: Bronze
  - 2013 Slovenia: Silver

==== Club ====
- Lithuanian League
  - Champion: 2004, 2005, 2013
- Baltic Basketball League
  - Champion: 2005
- Turkish Super League
  - Champion: 2011
- Turkish Cup
  - Winner: 2011
- VTB United League
  - Champion: 2012
- Russian PBL
  - Champion: 2012
  - Champion: 2012
- Ukrainian SuperLeague
  - Champion: 2014
- Ukrainian Cup
  - Winner: 2014
