= Panagiotis Liadelis =

Greek retired basketball player

Personal information
- Born: December 7, 1974 (age 51) Volos, Greece
- Listed height: 6 ft 4.5 in (1.94 m)
- Listed weight: 200 lb (91 kg)

Career information
- Playing career: 1993–2009
- Position: Point guard / shooting guard
- Number: 5, 10, 12, 19

Career history
- 1993–2000: Aris
- 2000–2002: PAOK
- 2002: Ural Great Perm
- 2002–2003: Makedonikos
- 2003: Pamesa Valencia
- 2003–2004: Olympiacos
- 2004–2006: Apollon Patras
- 2006–2009: Azovmash Mariupol

Career highlights
- All-EuroLeague Second Team (2001); FIBA Korać Cup champion (1997); Greek Cup winner (1998); Greek Cup Finals MVP (1998); Greek Cup Finals Top Scorer (1998); 4× Greek League All-Star (1996 II, 1997, 1999, 2004); Russian League champion (2002); 3× Ukrainian League champion (2007, 2008, 2009); 3× Ukrainian Cup winner (2006, 2008, 2009)
Medals
Men's basketball
Representing Greece
FIBA Europe Under-16 Championship
| Silver medal – second place | 1991 Greece | Under-16 |

Panagiotis Liadelis (born December 7, 1974, in Volos, Greece) is a retired Greek professional basketball player. At a height of 1.94 m (6 ft 4 1/2 in) tall, he played as a point guard-shooting guard.

== Professional career ==
Liadelis played for many successful teams. His first well-known club was the Greek club Aris Thessaloniki, where he played for many years and won the FIBA Korać Cup title, in the 1996–97 season, and the Greek Cup and Greek Cup MVP in 1998. He also played for the Greek clubs PAOK Thessaloniki, Makedonikos, Olympiacos Piraeus, and Apollon Patras. In all of those years, he was an efficient scorer in the Greek League and the EuroLeague, when he participated in the competition. His EuroLeague performances in the EuroLeague 2000–01 season, while wearing PAOK's jersey, earned him an All-EuroLeague Second Team selection.

He also played for the Russian Super League club Ural Great Perm, the Spanish ACB League club Valencia, and Azovmash Mariupol of the Ukrainian Super League.

In 2006, he moved to Azovmash Mariupol, and in the 2006–07 season, he was a finalist in the FIBA EuroCup, against Girona.

== National team career ==
Liadelis was also a member of the senior men's Greek national team. He had a total of 25 caps (games played) with Greece's senior national team, in which he scored a total of 190 points, for a scoring average of 7.6 points per game.

== Awards and accomplishments ==
- 4× Greek League All-Star: 1996 II, 1997, 1999, 2004
- FIBA Korać Cup Champion: 1997
- Greek Cup Winner: 1998
- Greek Cup Finals Top Scorer: 1998
- Greek Cup MVP: 1998
- All-EuroLeague Second Team: 2001
- Russian League Champion: 2002
- 3× Ukrainian Cup Winner: 2006, 2008, 2009
- 3× Ukrainian League Champion: 2007, 2008, 2009
