= Malysh =

Malysh is a Russian surname literally meaning "little one". Notable people with the surname include:

- Andriy Malysh (born 1983), Ukrainian basketball player
- Artem Malysh (born 2000), Ukrainian footballer
- Ihor Malysh (born 1983), Ukrainian footballer
