= R. T. Guinn =

American-Swedish basketball player

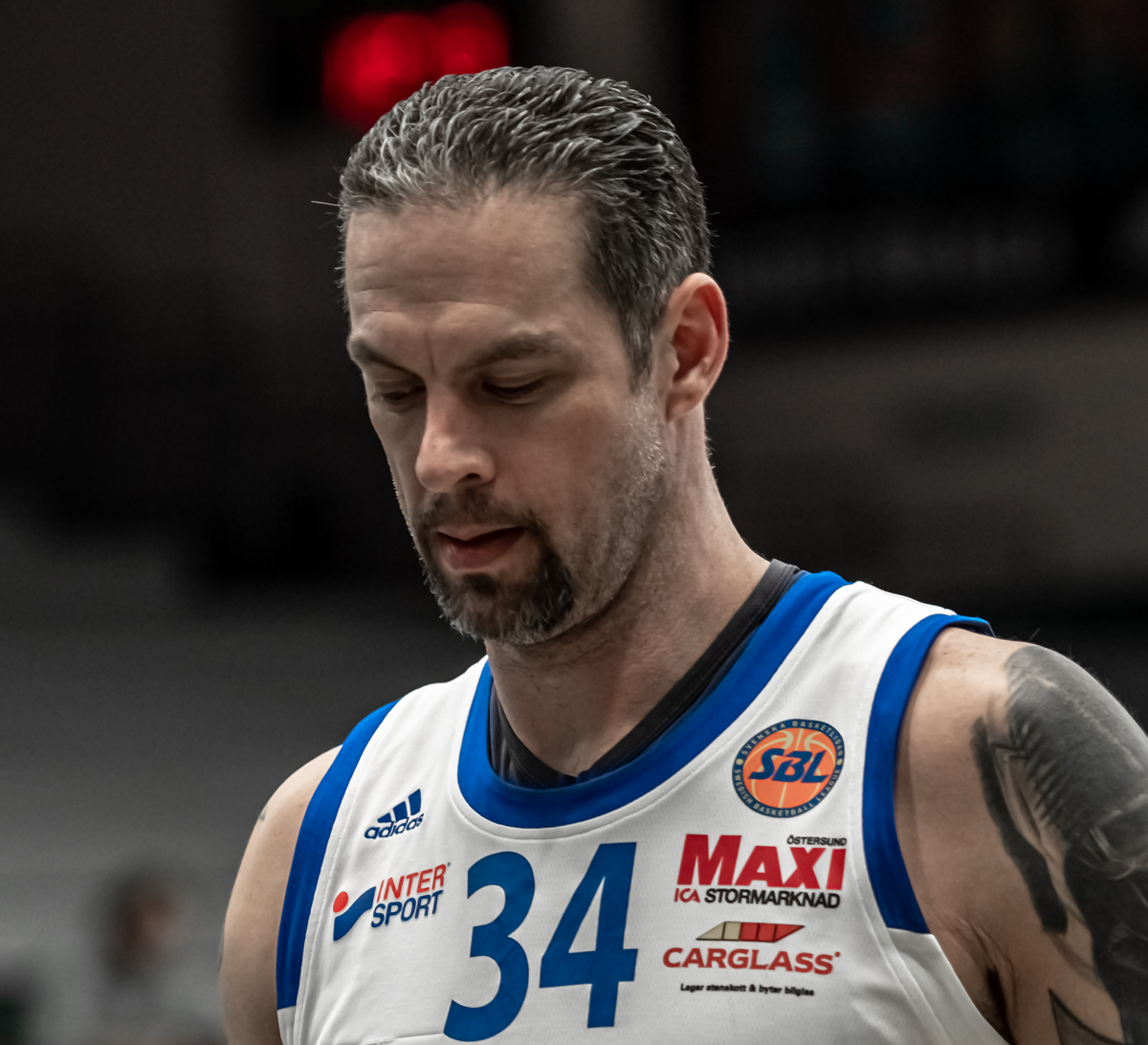

Personal information
- Born: February 10, 1981 (age 45) Bryan, Texas, U.S.
- Listed height: 6 ft 10 in (2.08 m)
- Listed weight: 265 lb (120 kg)

Career information
- High school: Cibola (Albuquerque, New Mexico); Valley (Albuquerque, New Mexico)
- College: New Mexico (1999–2000); Baylor (2001–2004)
- NBA draft: 2004: undrafted
- Playing career: 2004–2023
- Position: Power forward

Career history
- 2004–2005: Salon Vilpas
- 2005–2006: Södertälje Kings
- 2006–2008: Eisbären Bremerhaven
- 2008: Darüşşafaka
- 2008: Poltava
- 2008–2009: Azovmash
- 2009–2010: Budivelnyk
- 2010–2011: CSP Limoges
- 2011–2013: Ferro-ZNTU
- 2013: Panathinaikos
- 2013: Zielona Góra
- 2013–2014: Maccabi Ashdod
- 2014–2015: Torku Konyaspor
- 2015: Krasny Oktyabr
- 2016: Bandırma Kırmızı
- 2016–2017: Hitachi SunRockers
- 2017–2018: Atomerőmű SE
- 2018–2023: Jämtland

Career highlights
- Greek League champion (2013); Ukrainian League champion (2009); 2× Ukrainian Cup winner (2009, 2013)

Richard Thomas "R. T." Guinn (born February 10, 1981) is an American professional basketball player for Jämtland Basket. Standing at 6 ft 10 in (2.08 m), he plays the power forward-center position. In March 2019, RT Guinn got a Swedish citizenship.

== College career ==
Guinn was born in Bryan, Texas, and played high school basketball at Cibola High School and Valley High School in Albuquerque, New Mexico. After high school, he played college basketball at the University of New Mexico, with the New Mexico Lobos, during the 1999–2000 season. He then transferred to Baylor University, where he was a member of the Baylor Bears, from 2000 to 2004.

== Professional career ==
In his pro career, Guinn has played with the following clubs: Salon Vilpas of the Finnish League, Södertälje Kings of the Swedish League, Eisbären Bremerhaven of the German League, Darüşşafaka of the Turkish League, Poltava-Basket, Azovmash Mariupol, Budivelnyk, and Ferro-ZNTU of the Ukrainian League, and Panathinaikos of the Greek League.

He joined Panathinaikos in May 2013. On August 1, 2013, he signed with Stelmet Zielona Góra. He left them on December 3, 2013. He then signed with Maccabi Ashdod.

On June 27, 2014, he signed with Torku Konyaspor of Turkey for the 2014–15 season.

On August 1, 2015, he signed with Krasny Oktyabr of Russia. In late November 2015, he left the Russian club. On January 20, 2016, he signed for the rest of the season with Bandırma Kırmızı of the Turkish Basketball Second League.

On July 22, 2016, Guinn signed with Hitachi SunRockers of the Japanese B.League.

On October 31, 2017, Guinn signed with Hungarian club Atomerőmű SE.

On August 20, 2018, Guinn signed with Swedish club Jämtland Basket.
