= Stanislav Tymofeyenko =

Ukrainian basketball player

No. 21 – BC Dnipro
- Position: Power forward
- League: Ukrainian SuperLeague

Personal information
- Born: 3 June 1989 (age 37) Dnipropetrovsk, Ukrainian SSR, Soviet Union
- Listed height: 2.05 m (6 ft 9 in)

Career information
- Playing career: 2007–present

Career history
- 2007–2016: Dnipro
- 2016: Pieno žvaigždės
- 2016–present: Dnipro

Career highlights
- Ukrainian Cup MVP (2019); 4x Ukrainian Super League champion (2020); 4x Ukrainian Cup champion (2011, 2017–2019)
Medals
Men's 3x3 basketball
Representing Ukraine
European Championships
Bronze medal – third place	2017 Amsterdam	Team

Stanislav Tymofeyenko (born 3 June 1989) is a Ukrainian basketball player for BC Dnipro and the Ukrainian national team, where he participated at the EuroBasket 2015. He is bronze medalist of the 2017 FIBA 3x3 Europe Cup.
