= Larry Hall (basketball) =

American professional basketball player

No. 22 – Dresden Titans
- Position: Guard
- League: ProB

Personal information
- Born: May 22, 1983 (age 43) Long Beach, California
- Listed height: 1.91 m (6 ft 3 in)

Career information
- High school: Jordan (Long Beach, California)
- College: Western Oregon (2003–2007)
- NBA draft: 2007: undrafted
- Playing career: 2007–2018

Career history
- 2007: West Coast Hotshots
- 2007: BC Nokia
- 2007–2008: Tapiolan Honka
- 2008: Elektra Šoštanj
- 2010: Porvoon Tarmo
- 2010: Puntukas Anykščiai
- 2011: Tsmoki-Minsk
- 2011: SKP Banska Bystrica
- 2011–2012: Düsseldorf Baskets
- 2012–2013: Cherno More
- 2013–2014: Rakvere Tarvas
- 2014: Swiss Central Basket Luzern
- 2014–2015: Timba Timișoara
- 2015–2016: Politekhnika-Halychyna
- 2016: Cherkaski Mavpy
- 2016–2017: Kožuv
- 2017–2018: Dresden Titans

Larry Donell Hall Jr. (born May 22, 1983) is an American professional basketball player who last played for Dresden Titans of the ProB.
