= BC Prykarpattia-Hoverla =

Prykarpattia-Hoverla
- Nickname: Bears
- Leagues: Higher League
- Founded: 2002; 23 years ago
- History: BC Hoverla (2002–2022); BC Prykarpattia-Hoverla (2022–present)
- Stadium: College of Physical Education
- Capacity: 1,500
- Location: Ivano-Frankivsk, Ukraine
- Team colors: Green, Yellow
- President: Peleh Oleg
- Website: www.bcgoverla.if.ua

BC Prykarpattia-Hoverla (Ukrainian: БК Говерла), known also as Hoverla, is a professional basketball club based in Ivano-Frankivsk, Ukraine. The team plays in the Higher League, the Ukrainian's second division. The team colours are green and yellow.

== History ==
The club was founded in August 2002. Goverla entered the Ukrainian Basketball SuperLeague, the highest tier of professional basketball in Ukraine, in 2009.

== Honours ==
- Ukrainian Cup

Runners-up (1): 2013

== Season by season ==
Season	Tier	League	Pos.	Ukrainian Cup	European competitions	
2010–11	1	SuperLeague	4th			
2011–12	1	SuperLeague	6th		3 EuroChallenge	RS
2012–13	1	SuperLeague	8th	Runner-up		
2013–14	1	SuperLeague	10th	Semifinalist		
2014–15	1	SuperLeague	8th			
2015–16	1	SuperLeague	6th	Semifinalist		
2016–17	2	Higher League	1st			

== Players ==
=== Notable players ===
Note: Flags indicate national team eligibility at FIBA-sanctioned events. Players may hold other non-FIBA nationalities not displayed.

Criteria

To appear in this section a player must have either:

- Set a club record or won an individual award while at the club
- Played at least one official international match for their national team at any time
- Played at least one official NBA match at any time.

- (United States) Seamus Boxley
- (United States) Jeremy Chappell
- (United States) Dante Swanson
- (United States) Ryan Pearson
