= Steve Burtt Jr. =

American-born basketball player (born 1984)

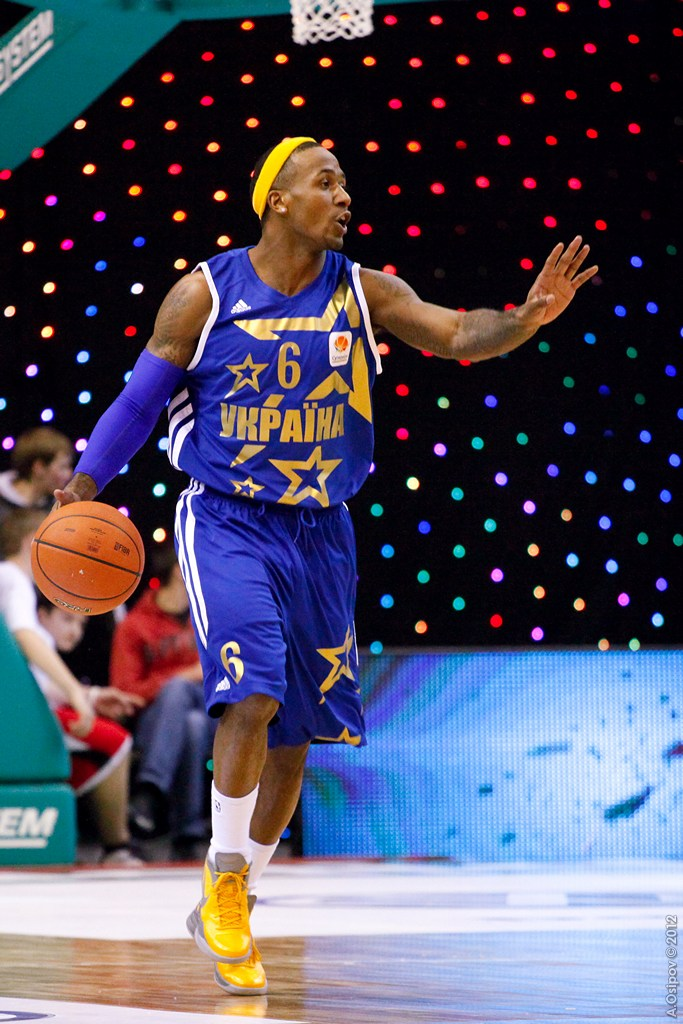

No. 11 – G.S. Eleftheroupoli
- Position: Shooting guard / point guard
- League: Elite League

Personal information
- Born: March 7, 1984 (age 42) New York City, New York, U.S.
- Listed height: 6 ft 2 in (1.88 m)
- Listed weight: 185 lb (84 kg)

Career information
- High school: Rice (New York City, New York)
- College: Iona (2002–2006)
- NBA draft: 2006: undrafted
- Playing career: 2006–present

Career history
- 2006: Northeast Pennsylvania Breakers
- 2006–2007: Olympiada Patron
- 2007: Benfica
- 2007: Ignis Novara
- 2007–2009: Ironi Ashkelon
- 2009: ViveMenorca
- 2009: Apollon Limassol
- 2010: Ferro-ZNTU
- 2010–2012: BC Dnipro
- 2012–2013: Tofaş Bursa
- 2013: Avtodor Saratov
- 2013–2014: Spartak Saint Petersburg
- 2014: Stelmet Zielona Góra
- 2014–2015: Baloncesto Fuenlabrada
- 2015: Atléticos de San Germán
- 2015–2016: Byblos Club
- 2016: Guizhou White Tigers
- 2017: Apollon Patras
- 2017: Sagesse
- 2017: Caciques de Humacao
- 2017–2018: Sanat Naft Abadan
- 2018: Faros Larissas
- 2018–2019: Rethymno Cretan Kings
- 2019–2020: Ionikos Nikaias
- 2020: Gimnasia y Esgrima
- 2020–2021: Budivelnyk
- 2023: Ionikos Nikaias
- 2023–2024: Milon
- 2024–Present: Eletheroupoli

Career highlights
- Greek League Top Scorer (2019); All-Greek League Second Team (2019); Israeli League Top Scorer (2008); 3× Ukrainian Cup winner (2010, 2011, 2021); 3× Ukrainian League All-Star (2010–2012); Ukrainian Cup MVP (2021); Lebanese Cup winner (2016); Lebanese SuperCup winner (2016); Greek A2 Elite League champion (2024); First-team All-MAAC (2006); Second-team All-MAAC (2005); Third-team All-MAAC (2004)

Steven Dwayne Burtt Jr. (Ukrainian: Стівен Буртт; born March 7, 1984) is an American-born naturalized Ukrainian professional basketball player.

Born in the United States, he received Ukrainian citizenship in 2011 and played for the Ukrainian national team. After four years at Iona, Burtt entered the 2006 NBA draft but was not selected.

== High school career ==
Burtt played high school basketball at Rice High School, in New York City, New York.

== College career ==
As of April 2015, Burtt is Iona’s second all-time leader in scoring with 2,034 points, behind his father Steve Burtt Sr. They are one of just two father-son duos to score 2,000 points each in NCAA Division I basketball, the other being Dell Curry and Steph Curry. In 2012, he was inducted in Iona basketball Hall of Fame. Burtt was named first team All-MAAC in 2006, second team All-MAAC in 2005 and third team All-MAAC in 2004.

== Professional career ==
On March 5, 2009, Burtt signed with Vive Menorca of Spain. On April 28, 2009, he was released by Menorca.

In the summer of 2009, he signed with Apollon Limassol of Cyprus. In January 2010, he moved to Ukraine and signed with BC Ferro-ZNTU for the remainder of the season.

In August 2010, he signed with BC Dnipro of Ukraine. In July 2011, he re-signed with Dnipro for one more season.

In July 2012, he signed a 1+1 contract with Tofaş of Turkey. In January 2013, he parted ways with Tofaş. In March 2013, he moved to Russia and signed with Avtodor Saratov for the rest of the season.

On September 26, 2013, he signed with Spartak Saint Petersburg of Russia for the 2013–14 season.

On July 31, 2014, Burtt signed with Stelmet Zielona Góra of Poland. On December 5, 2014, he left Zielona Góra and signed a two-year deal with Baloncesto Fuenlabrada of Spain. On April 13, 2015, he left Fuenlabrada and signed with Atléticos de San Germán of Puerto Rico for the rest of the 2015 BSN season.

On August 21, 2015, he signed with Byblos Club of Lebanon. In May 2016, he signed in China with the Guizhou White Tigers for the 2016 NBL season.

On February 10, 2017, Burtt signed with the Greek club Apollon Patras. On March 31, 2018, Burtt moved to Faros Larissas, after stints in Lebanon, Puerto Rico and Iran. On May 10, 2018 Burtt signed with Ionikos Nikaias, but the deal never came through. On September 26, 2018, he joined another Greek team, the Rethymno Cretan Kings.

On October 28, 2020, Burtt signed with Budivelnyk of the Ukrainian Basketball Super League.

In April of 2023, Burtt came out of retirement to play a single game with Ionikos Nikaias against Karditsa, in order for the Greek club to avoid relegation. He scored 29 points and passed out a career-high 9 assists, playing almost 39 minutes out of the available 40, but his club fell to a final score of 85–83.

== National team career ==
In 2011, Burtt acquired Ukrainian citizenship and represented the senior Ukrainian national team at EuroBasket 2011.

== The Basketball Tournament ==
Steve Burtt played for Gael Nation in the 2018 edition of The Basketball Tournament. In two games, he averaged 16.5 points, 2.5 assists, and 2 rebounds per game. Gael Nation reached the second round before falling to Armored Athlete.

== Personal life ==
Burtt is the son of former Iona College and NBA player Steve Burtt Sr. He received a degree from Iona in Marketing.
