= 2013–14 Ukrainian Basketball SuperLeague =

Ukrainian SuperLeague
- Season: 2013–14
- Duration: 10 October 2013 – 13 May 2014
- Games played: 204
- Teams: 14

Regular season
- Season MVP: (Lithuania) Darjuš Lavrinovič

Finals
- Champions: Budivelnyk (9th title)
- Runners-up: Khimik Yuzhny
- Third place: Azovmash
- Fourth place: Donetsk

Statistical leaders
Points	(United States) Donald Sims	21.4
Rebounds	(United States) Kervin Bristol	12.4
Assists	(United States) Dominique Coleman	9.0
- All statistics correct as of 11 September 2014.

The 2013–14 Ukrainian Basketball SuperLeague was the 23rd edition of the Ukrainian top-tier basketball championship, which began on 10 October 2013, and finished on May 13 2014. Budivelnyk won its 8th Ukrainian title by beating BC Khimik 3–1 in the Finals.

== Participants ==
Team	Home city	Stadium	Capacity
BC Azovmash	Mariupol	Azovmash Sports Palace	3,000
BC Budivelnyk	Kyiv	Merydian Sports Complex	1,500
Cherkaski Mavpy	Cherkasy	Budivelnyk Sports Palace	1,500
BC Dnipro	Dnipropetrovsk	Meteor Sports Palace	6,500
BC Dnipro-Azot	Dniprodzerzhynsk	Mykhaylo Anoshkin Tennis Palace	1,000
BC Donetsk	Donetsk	Druzhba Sports Palace	4,700
BC Ferro-ZNTU	Zaporizhzhia	ZAS Sports Palace	1,200
BC Hoverla	Ivano-Frankivsk	CPE Manezh	1,500
BC Khimik	Yuzhne	Olimp Physical Culture and Sports Complex	2,000
SC Kryvbas	Kryvyy Rih	KTU Sports Complex	1,300
BC Kyiv	Kyiv	Merydian Sports Complex	1,500
MBC Mykolaiv	Mykolaiv	Nadezhda Sports Palace	2,000
BC Odesa	Odesa	Krayan Sports Complex	1,500
BC Politekhnika-Halychyna	Lviv	Halychyna Sports Palace	1,200

== Regular season ==
	Team	Pld	W	L	PF	PA	Qualification
1	Khimik	26	23	3	2144	1762	Qualified for the Playoffs
2	Budivelnyk	26	19	7	2253	1951	Qualified for the Playoffs
3	Azovmash	26	18	8	1983	1844	Qualified for the Playoffs
4	BC Donetsk	26	17	9	2064	1995	Qualified for the Playoffs
5	Ferro-ZNTU	26	17	9	1974	1973	Qualified for the Playoffs
6	BC Odesa	26	15	11	2051	2065	Qualified for the Playoffs
7	MBC Mykolaiv	26	13	13	2019	1985	Qualified for the Playoffs
8	BC Kyiv	26	12	14	1966	2003	Qualified for the Playoffs
9	Politekhnika-Halychyna	26	12	14	2001	2027	
10	Hoverla	26	11	15	1921	2013	
11	Cherkaski Mavpy	26	10	16	2066	2096	
12	Dnipro	26	6	20	1768	1987	
13	Kryvbas	26	5	21	1876	2152	
14	Dnipro-Azot	26	4	22	1830	2063	

== Playoffs ==
=== Bracket ===
Quarter Finals
1	Khimik	2
8	BC Kyiv	0
4	BC Donetsk	2
5	Ferro-ZNTU	0
2	Budivelnyk	2
7	MBC Mykolaiv	0
3	Azovmash	2
6	BC Odesa	0

Semifinals
1	Khimik	3
4	BC Donetsk	0
2	Budivelnyk	3
3	Azovmash	1

Finals
1	Khimik	1
2	Budivelnyk	3
Third place
3	Azovmash	3
4	BC Donetsk	0

=== Quarterfinals ===
- Khimik - BC Kyiv 2-0 (84:55, 65:61)
- BC Donetsk - Ferro-ZNTU 2-0 (92:75, 77:65)
- Budivelnyk - MBC Mykolaiv 2-0 (92:69, 90:68)
- Azovmash - BC Odesa 2-0 (74:52, 67:44)

=== Semifinals ===
- Khimik - BC Donetsk 3-0 (78:67, 91:60, 91:79)
- Budivelnyk - Azovmash 3-1 (76:43, 75:63, 73:91, 92:81)

=== Third place ===
- Azovmash - BC Donetsk 3-0 (82:61, 82:73, 75:53)

=== Final ===
- Khimik - Budivelnyk 1-3 (65:74, 73:70, 72:82, 77:85)

== Awards ==
=== Most Valuable Player ===
- (Lithuania) Darjuš Lavrinovič – Budivelnyk

== Ukrainian clubs in European competitions ==
Team	Competition	Progress
Budivelnyk	Euroleague	Regular season
Budivelnyk	Eurocup	Eightfinals
Khimik	Eurocup	Round of 16
Kyiv	EuroChallenge	Regular season

== Ukrainian clubs in Regional competitions ==
Team	Competition	Progress
Donetsk	VTB United League	Withdrawn
Azovmash	VTB United League	Regular season
