= Vladan Vukosavljević (basketball) =

Serbian basketball player

No. 27 – Timișoara
- Position: Center
- League: Liga Națională

Personal information
- Born: October 6, 1984 (age 42) Jagodina, SFR Yugoslavia
- Listed height: 2.05 m (6 ft 9 in)
- Listed weight: 130 kg (287 lb)

Career information
- NBA draft: 2006: undrafted
- Playing career: 2001–present

Career history
- 2001–2002: Svilajnac
- 2002–2003: Crvena zvezda
- 2003–2004: OKK Beograd
- 2004: Lovćen
- 2004–2005: Crvena zvezda
- 2005–2009: Hemofarm
- 2009: Oostende
- 2009–2010: Aliağa Petkim
- 2010–2011: Radnički Kragujevac
- 2011–2013: Politekhnika-Halychyna
- 2014–2015: Champville
- 2015–2016: Tadamon Zouk
- 2017: Hoops Club
- 2017–2018: Tadamon Zouk
- 2018–present: Timișoara

Vladan Vukosavljević (born October 6, 1984) is a Serbian professional basketball player for the Timișoara of the Romanian Liga Națională. He was born in Jagodina, but he moved to Svilajnac as a boy.
