= Randy Culpepper =

American basketball player (born 1989)

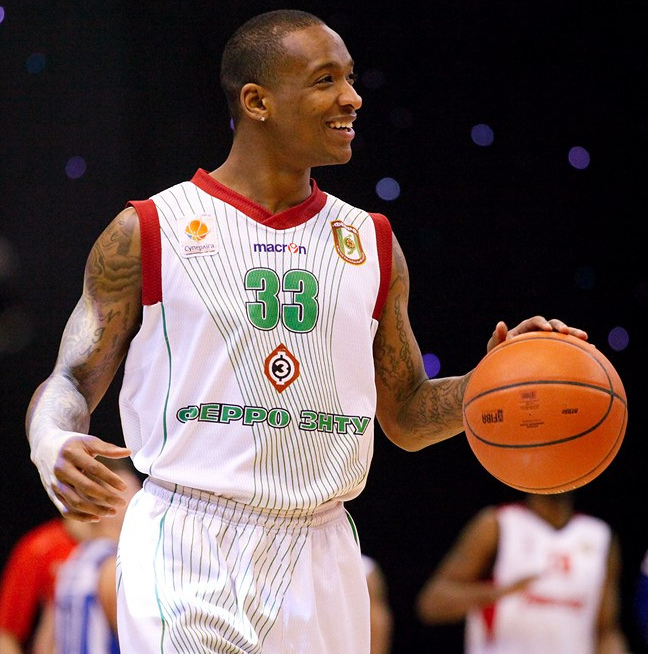
- Culpepper with Ferro-ZNTU in 2012

No. 5 – Gezira
- Position: Point guard / shooting guard
- League: Egyptian Basketball Premier League

Personal information
- Born: May 16, 1989 (age 37) Memphis, Tennessee, U.S.
- Listed height: 1.82 m (6 ft 0 in)
- Listed weight: 79 kg (174 lb)

Career information
- High school: Sheffield (Memphis, Tennessee)
- College: UTEP (2007–2011)
- NBA draft: 2011: undrafted
- Playing career: 2011–present

Career history
- 2011–2013: Ferro-ZNTU
- 2013–2014: Krasny Oktyabr
- 2014: Sagesse Beirut
- 2014–2015: Krasny Oktyabr
- 2015: Limoges CSP
- 2015–2016: Beşiktaş
- 2016–2017: Best Balıkesir
- 2017–2018: Pallacanestro Cantù
- 2018–2019: Anyang KGC
- 2019: Afyon Belediye
- 2019–2020: Prometey Kamianske
- 2020: Pistoia
- 2020–2021: Scafati Basket
- 2021: Soles de Mexicali
- 2022: Pieno žvaigždės Pasvalys
- 2022: US Monastir
- 2022–2023: Basket Brno
- 2023–2024: Smouha
- 2024: Al Gharafa Doha
- 2024: City Oilers
- 2025–present: Gezira

Career highlights
- Turkish League All-Star (2016); VTB United League top scorer (2015); EuroCup top scorer (2015); Ukrainian Cup winner (2013); Ukrainian Cup MVP (2012); Ukrainian League All-Star (2012); Conference USA Player of the Year (2010)

Randy Lechard Culpepper Sr. (born May 16, 1989) is an American professional basketball player for the Gezira of the Egyptian Basketball Premier League.

== College career ==
He played for the University of Texas El Paso Miners. He is in Conference USA's top 15 all-time in career scoring, and in 2009–10 was named the Conference USA Men's Basketball Player of the Year. In Culpepper's first season, he was named NCAA sixth man of year. He averaged 12 points and 2 rebounds. In his second year he was a solid starter averaging 15 points and 3 rebounds. His 3rd year, he was a C-USA champ averaging 17 points, 4 rebounds, and 3 assists. He had the league high with 45 points against West Carolina. His senior year he averaged 19 points, 4 rebounds, and 2 assists.

== Professional career ==
On June 29, 2011 he signed with Ferro-ZNTU of the Ukrainian SuperLeague. On April 26, 2012 he re-signed with them for one more season. In July 2013, he signed a two-year deal with Russian team Krasny Oktyabr. He was waived in March 2014. He then signed with Sagesse Beirut of Lebanon. However, he left Sagesse after only two games. In September 2014, he signed with Jilin Northeast Tigers. However, he did not pass the tryout period with the Chinese team. On October 31, 2014, he returned to his former team Krasny Oktyabr.

On July 26, 2015, he signed with Limoges CSP. On December 6, 2015, he left Limoges and signed with the Turkish club Beşiktaş for the rest of the season.

In July 2016, Culpepper joined the Memphis Grizzlies for the 2016 NBA Summer League. On October 11, 2016, he signed with Turkish club Best Balıkesir for the 2016–17 season. On March 9, 2017, he parted ways with Balıkesir after appearing in 14 games.

On June 16, 2017, Culpepper signed with Italian club Pallacanestro Cantù for the 2017–18 season. Ha averaged 17.2 points, 3.3 rebounds and 3.6 assists per game. On October 1, 2018, Culpepper signed with Korean club Anyang KGC for the 2018–19 season.

On February 13, 2019, he has signed with Afyon Belediye of the Turkish Basketbol Süper Ligi (BSL).

On August 15, 2019, he has signed with Prometey Kamianske of the Ukrainian Basketball SuperLeague.

At mid-season Culpepper signs for Pistoia Basket 2000 in the Italian championship that at that moment was competing not to relegate the Serie A2. He scored 20 points and grabbed four rebounds in his only game. On July 9, 2020, Culpepper signed with Scafati Basket.

On November 18, 2022, he signed with US Monastir, defending BAL champions, in Tunisia.

In April 2024, Culpepper signed with Ugandan club City Oilers and joined them for the 2024 BAL season. On April 19, 2024, Culpepper had 15 points and 4 rebounds in his Oilers debut in a 76–99 loss to defending champions Al Ahly.

On January 13, 2025, Culpepper signed with the Gezira of the Egyptian Basketball Premier League.
