= BC Odesa =

Professional basketball club

- Leagues: SuperLeague
- Founded: 1992
- History: List: BIPA-Moda (1992–1999) MBC Odesa (1999–2006) BC Odesa (2006–2016) BC Dynamo Odesa (2017–2018) BC Odesa (2018–present)
- Arena: Palace of Sport
- Capacity: 3,500
- Location: Odesa, Ukraine
- Team colors: Blue, Dark Blue, White
- Championships: 4 Ukrainian Championships; 2 Ukrainian Cups; 1 NEBL Challenge Cup
- Website: bcodessa.ua
| Home | Away |

BC Odesa (Ukrainian: баскетбольний клуб "Одеса") is a Ukrainian professional basketball club based in Odesa. The club competed in the Ukrainian Basketball SuperLeague (UBSL).

Established in 1992, Odesa played in the SuperLeague for most of its existence until it disappeared in 2016. In 2018, the club was re-founded when it merged with BC Dynamo Odesa.

== History ==
BC Odesa was one of the most distinguished basketball clubs in the country and has won the UBSL championship 4 times. It was founded in 1992 under the name BIPA-Moda after its sponsor company. Following the death of its 1st president Arkadiy Tabachnyk in 1999, the club became municipal and, hence, changed its name to MBC Odesa. In 2006, the club turned private again after its purchase by the current president Oleh Bychkov, and its name was changed to the present BC Odesa. After the 2015–16 season, the club disappeared. However, another club BIPA Odesa played in the SuperLeague the following years.

In the summer of 2018, BC Dynamo Odesa, winner of the second-tier division, was renamed and merged to BC Odesa. Previously, BIPA Odesa was merged to BC Dynamo Odesa in 2017.

== Season by season ==
| Season | Tier | League | Pos. | Ukrainian Cup | European competitions |
|---|---|---|---|---|---|
| 2010–11 | 1 | SuperLeague | 10th | | |
| 2011–12 | 1 | SuperLeague | 7th | Semifinalist | |
| 2012–13 | 1 | SuperLeague | 12th | | |
| 2013–14 | 1 | SuperLeague | 6th | | |
| 2014–15 | 1 | SuperLeague | 9th | | |
| 2015–16 | 1 | SuperLeague | 8th | | |

=== Since re-foundation in 2018 ===
| Season | Tier | League | Pos. | Ukrainian Cup | European competitions |
|---|---|---|---|---|---|
| 2018–19 | 1 | SuperLeague | 6th | Runner-up | |

== Players ==
=== Hall of Fame ===
- #5 (Ukraine) Vadym Pudzyrey
- #4 (Ukraine) Oleg Yuzhkin

== Notable players ==
- (Ukraine) Ihor Kharchenko
- (Ukraine) Ihor Molchanov
- (Ukraine) Leonid Yaylo
- (Ukraine) Yaroslav Zubritskiy
- (Ukraine) Oleksandr Okunskiy
- (Ukraine) Hennadiy Kuznetsov
- (Ukraine) Oleksiy Poltorackiy
- (Ukraine) Vadym Matyukevych
- (Ukraine) Oleh Tkach
- (Ukraine) Vadym Matukevich

- (Lithuania) Tomas Pačėsas
- (United States) Otis Hill
- (United States) Dario Hunt
- (United States) Jerel Blassingame
- (United States) Larry Turner
- (United States) Willie Deane
- (United States) Jamison Brewer
- (Saint Vincent and the Grenadines) Shawn King

== Head coaches ==
- (Ukraine) Vitaliy Lebedyntsev: 1992–1996, 1998–2001, 2008–2010
- (Russia) Yuriy Selikhov: 1996–1998
- (Belarus) Valiantsin Varonin
- (Ukraine) Oleh Yushkin: 2010–2015

== Honors ==
=== Domestic competitions ===
- Ukrainian Super League

Champions (4): 1997–98, 1998–99, 2000–01, 2001–02

- Ukrainian Cup

Champions (2): 1993, 2001
Runners-up: 2019

=== International competitions ===
- NEBL Challenge Cup

Winners (1): 2001
