= BC Donetsk =

Donetsk
- Nickname: Tigers
- Founded: 2006
- Folded: 2014
- History: BC Donetsk; 2006–2014
- Arena: Druzhba Palace of Sports
- Capacity: 4,700
- Location: Donetsk, Ukraine
- Team colors: Orange and black
- Championships: 1 Ukrainian SuperLeague; 1 Ukrainian Second League; 1 Ukrainian Third League
Home	Away

Basketball Club Donetsk (Ukrainian: баскетбольний клуб Донецьк), commonly known as simply Donetsk, was a Ukrainian professional basketball club based in Donetsk. The team played in the Ukrainian SuperLeague. The mascot of the team was a tiger, which also appeared on their logo. "The Tigers" was their nickname.

== History ==
In Soviet times, there was one professional basketball team in Donetsk, called Shakhtyor (which translates as Miners in English). It had built a reputation as a highly competitive team. In the years following Ukrainian independence, the Miners finished second in the country on one occasion and third place another season, and played 24 games in the Euro cup championships.

In 2006, a new club - BC Donetsk was founded to continue the basketball traditions of the Donbass. The initiator and the founder of a new club was Valery Plekhanov, who also became its coach, and started playing in the Ukrainian First League, which is the third highest league in Ukraine. In their first season (2006–07), the team finished first, going undefeated at 34-0, and was promoted to the Ukrainian Higher League, which is the second highest league in the country. At that season (2007–08) the team finished 53-3, one of the leaders of the team Konstantin Galenkin was announced as the best center forward of the tournament. As a result of its successful season, BC "Donetsk" was promoted to the Ukrainian Basketball Super League. In the same season the team finally found a sponsor: Sergei Dyadechko, who also became the president of the club. Even though just promoted, the team received a wild card to play in the EuroChallenge 2008–09. The person who helped BC Donetsk to get its wild card was Sergei Bubka.

Before the start of the 2008–09 season a new coach was hired to lead a team, Olympic champion Igors Miglinieks. Also to reinforce the team before new season, some members the national teams of Ukraine, Belarus and Puerto Rico were signed by BC Donetsk.

The team set a goal: to become the champion of the Ukrainian Basketball Super League in its first year as a member and to be competitive in its debut in the EuroChallenge.

The nickname of team is the Tigers. Color scale of a game form is white, black and orange colors. The tiger — one of the largest predators of family cats, symbolizes grace, dexterity and huge power. The Donetsk Tiger is a symbol of activity, fight, commitment and success. White color symbolizes purity, virtue and pleasure, black color in many martial arts means the highest rank, and orange — color of a holiday and nobility.

The Donetsk basketball club is played its home games at Druzhba — one of the best arenas in Ukraine.

Since the 2008–09 season, the team plays in the Superleague of Ukraine. BC Donetsk took second place in the season 2008–09, winning the playoff semi-finals against BC Kyiv, before losing to BC Azovmash in the finals.

During the 2009–10 season, BC Donetsk had suspended play before the season had ended. The president of Donetsk Tigers — Dyadechko S. V. left his post of the president of club for the personal reasons. The team cancelled the rest of its games and closed due to financial problems. Its players were dismissed and became free agents. At the beginning of 2010, a few months later, the management of team found financial support from the Party of Regions, the political party in power in Ukraine at the time, and a number of deputies assisted in financing BC Donetsk and youth sports clubs.

During the 2010–11, BC Donetsk remained in the SuperLeague. The Serbian expert Saša Obradović became the head coach. Again reaching the finals, BC Donetsk lost to the Kyiv-based club BC Budivelnyk in seven games, repeating as SuperLeague runners-up.

During the 2011–12 season, BC Donetsk participated in Eurocup. It was unprecedented for Donetsk basketball, having reached the Top 8, Donetsk conceded to the Lithuanian BC Lietuvos rytas. That season Donetsk team for the first time in its history won the Superleague championship.

== Honours ==
- Ukrainian SuperLeague
  - Champions (1): 2011–12
- Ukrainian Second League
  - Champions (1): 2007–08
- Ukrainian Third League
  - Champions (1): 2006–07

== Season by season ==
Season	Tier	League	Pos.	Ukrainian Cup	United League	European competitions	
2010–11	1	SuperLeague	2nd			3 EuroChallenge	RS
2011–12	1	SuperLeague	1st			2 Eurocup	QF
2012–13	1	SuperLeague	6th		Last 16	2 Eurocup	RS
2013–14	1	SuperLeague	4th	Runner-up	Group stage		

== Notable players ==
- (United States) (Israel) D'or Fischer
- (Ukraine) Viacheslav Kravtsov
- (Lithuania) Darius Songaila
- (North Macedonia) Vojdan Stojanovski
