= MBC Mariupol =

Ukrainian basketball team

MBC Mariupol МБК «Маріуполь»
- Founded: 1990
- History: BC Azovmash (1990–2014)
- Arena: Azovmash Arena
- Capacity: 3,022
- Location: Mariupol, Ukraine
- Team colors: Blue, White, Orange
- Championships: 7 Ukrainian Leagues; 5 Ukrainian Cups
Home	Away

MBC Mariupol (Ukrainian: МБК «Маріуполь», formerly BK Azovmash) was a Ukrainian professional basketball club. It was founded in 1990 in the city of Mariupol in South-Eastern Ukraine.

Mariupol was one of the strongest teams in Ukraine along with Kyiv, Khimik, and Cherkasy. The team's performance peak was an appearance in the EuroCup Final of 2007, against Akasvayu Girona.

== History ==
The club was founded in 1990. Azovmash moved up from the Ukrainian third to first division by 1999. Azovmash won the 2002 Ukrainian SuperLeague title. Azovmash added another Ukrainian title in 2004 and following the arrival of point guard Khalid El-Amin, won the domestic championship again in 2006 and 2007.

In 2007, with players like Kenan Bajramović, Panagiotis Liadelis, Serhiy Lishchuk and El-Amin, Azovmash reached the FIBA EuroCup Final Four, defeating Italian Serie A club Virtus Bologna by a point in the semis before falling to Spanish Liga ACB club Akasvayu Girona in the title game. In 2008, Azovmash reached the elimination rounds ULEB Cup and won the Ukrainian domestic championship and cup.

After leaving the Ukrainian Basketball Superleague in 2014, the club did not join any competition until 2016, when the club joined the Higher League, the Ukrainian second division.

== Season by season ==
Season	Tier	League	Pos.	Ukrainian Cup	United League	European competitions	
2008–09	1	SuperLeague	1st	Winner		2 Eurocup	T16
2009–10	1	SuperLeague	1st	Semifinalist		2 Eurocup	RS
2010–11	1	SuperLeague	4th	Runner-up	Fourth place	2 Eurocup	RS
2011–12	1	SuperLeague	2nd		Regular season	2 Eurocup	RS
2012–13	1	SuperLeague	2nd		Regular season	2 Eurocup	RS
2013–14	1	SuperLeague	3rd		Regular season		

== Honours ==
- Ukrainian SuperLeague:
  - Gold - 2003, 2004, 2006, 2007, 2008, 2009, 2010
  - Silver - 2005, 2012, 2013
  - Bronze - 2001, 2002
- Ukrainian Cup:
  - Gold - 2001, 2002, 2006, 2008, 2009
  - Silver - 2007
- FIBA EuroCup:
  - Gold Conference North - 2003
  - Finalist of the EuroCup 2006-07

== Notable players ==
Note: Flags indicate national team eligibility at FIBA-sanctioned events. Players may hold other non-FIBA nationalities not displayed.

Criteria

To appear in this section a player must have either:

- Set a club record or won an individual award while at the club
- Played at least one official international match for their national team at any time
- Played at least one official NBA match at any time.

- (Ukraine) Oleksandr Rayevsky
- (Ukraine) Serhiy Lishchuk
- (Ukraine) Alexander Lokhmanchuk
- (Ukraine) Kyrylo Fesenko
- (Ukraine) Maksym Pustozvonov
- (Ukraine) Denys Lukashov
- (Ukraine) Vyacheslav Bobrov
- (Ukraine) Ihor Zaytsev
- (Ukraine) Oleksandr Kol'čenko
- (Belgium) Thomas Van Den Spiegel
- (Bosnia and Herzegovina) Kenan Bajramović
- (Bosnia and Herzegovina) Nemanja Gordić
- (Bosnia and Herzegovina) Ratko Varda
- (Croatia) Slaven Rimac
- (United Kingdom) Robert Archibald
- (Greece) Panagiotis Liadelis
- (Italy) Nikola Radulović
- (Latvia) Sandis Valters
- (Lithuania) Tomas Delininkaitis
- (Lithuania) Simonas Serapinas
- (Montenegro) Vladimir Golubović
- (Slovenia) Aleksandar Ćapin
- (Slovakia) Radoslav Rancik
- (Serbia) Miroslav Raduljica
- (Serbia) Ivan Paunić
- (Serbia) Tadija Dragićević
- (United States) William Avery
- (United States) Rodney Buford
- (United States) R. T. Guinn
- (United States) Tyus Edney
- (United States) Khalid El-Amin
- (United States) Junior Harrington
- (United States) Jermaine Jackson
- (United States) Kris Lang
- (United States) Carlos Powell
- (United States) Marc Salyers
- (United States) Dijon Thompson
- (United States) Joe Crispin

== Head coaches ==
- (Ukraine) Vitaliy Lebedintsev (2002)
- (Ukraine) Andriy Podkovyrov (2002–2004)
- (Lithuania) Rimas Girskis (2004–2007)
- (Lithuania) Algirdas Brazys (2007–Dec. 2007)
- (Ukraine) Sergiy Zavalin (Dec. 2007–Feb. 2008 )
- (Slovenia) Memi Bečirovič (Feb.–Nov. 2008)
- (Lithuania) Rimas Girskis (Nov. 2008– Nov. 2009)
- (Ukraine) Andriy Podkovyrov (Nov. 2009–Feb. 2010)
- (Ukraine) Sergiy Zavalin (Feb.–Nov. 2010)
- (Lithuania) Rolandas Jarutis (Nov. 2010–Jun. 2011 )
- (Serbia) Aleksandar Petrović (Jun.–Dec. 2011)
- (Lithuania) Gintaras Krapikas (Dec. 2011–Feb. 2012)
- (Italy) Luca Bechi (Feb.–Jun. 2012)
- (Serbia) Aleksandar Kesar (Jul.–Nov. 2012)
- (Ukraine) Sergiy Zavalin (Nov. 2012)
- (Ukraine) Sergiy Zavalin (Jun. 2013–Jan. 2014)
- (Montenegro) Zvezdan Mitrović (Jan.–May 2014)
