= BC Dnipro =

Dnipro
- Leagues: SuperLeague
- Founded: 12 December 2003; 21 years ago
- History: BC Dnipro (2003–present)
- Stadium: Palace of Sports Shynnik
- Capacity: 5,600
- Location: Dnipro, Ukraine
- Team colors: Navy blue, black, sky blue
- President: Valerii Kondratiev
- Championships: 3 Ukrainian SuperLeague; 2 Ukrainian Second League; 6 Ukrainian Cup
- Website: bcdnipro.com
Home	Away

The Basketball Club Dnipro (Ukrainian: баскетбольний клуб «Дніпро»), commonly known as simply Dnipro, is a Ukrainian professional basketball club that is based in Dnipro. The home court of the club is Palace of Sports Shynnik. The women's team of the club won the Ukrainian Superleague in 2010.

== History ==
The women's team of the club has made three appearances in the FIBA Eurocup since 2007. Dnipro would reach their first championship series against BC Khimik in 2015, only to be swept by them by three games. A year later, Dnipro would win their first ever Ukrainian SuperLeague Championship, sweeping BC Budivelnyk in all three of their games against them.

The 2019–20 Superleague season was ended prematurely due to the COVID-19 pandemic. Because Dnipro was first in the standings at the time, the team won its second championship.

== Honours ==
- Ukrainian SuperLeague

(gold) Champions (4): 2016, 2020, 2024, 2025
(silver) Runners-up (3): 2015, 2018, 2023
(bronze) Third place (1) 2017

- Ukrainian Cup

(gold) Champions (6): 2011, 2016, 2017, 2018, 2019, 2024
(silver) Runners-up (2): 2015, 2020

== Season by season ==
Season	Tier	League	Pos.	Ukrainian Cup	Other competitions		European competitions		
2006-07	1	SuperLeague	QF				4 EuroCup Challenge	SF	6–4
2009-10	1	SuperLeague	7th						
2010–11	1	SuperLeague	7th	Champion	United League (Note: From the season 2014-15 basketball teams from Ukraine do not participate in VTB United League.)	RS			
2011–12	1	SuperLeague	8th						
2012–13	1	SuperLeague	11th						
2013–14	1	SuperLeague	12th						
2014–15	1	SuperLeague	2nd	Runner-up					
2015–16	1	SuperLeague	1st (Note: During the 2015-16 season Ukrainian Championship was divided in two leagues: Ukrainian SL Favorit Sport and Ukrainian Basketball SuperLeague. Also there were two cups: Ukrainian Basketball Cup and Ukraine SuperLeague Cup.)	Champion					
2016–17	1	SuperLeague	3rd	Champion					
2017–18	1	SuperLeague	2nd	Champion			4 FIBA Europe Cup	QR1	1–1
2018–19	1	SuperLeague	4th	Champion			4 FIBA Europe Cup	RS	1–5
2019–20	1	SuperLeague	1st (Note: The 2019–20 season was curtailed due to the COVID-19 pandemic, BC Dnipro was named champions based on standings at the time.)	Runner-up			4 FIBA Europe Cup	RS	4–4
2020–21	1	SuperLeague	3rd				1 Champions League	QR1	0–1
2021–22	1	SuperLeague	Canceled (Note: The 2021–22 season was canceled due to the full scale russian invasion of Ukraine. The standings were not counted.)				4 FIBA Europe Cup	QR1	0–1
2022–23	1	SuperLeague	2nd						
2023–24	1	SuperLeague	1st	Champion					
2024–25	1	SuperLeague	1st	Champion			4 FIBA Europe Cup	RS	2–6

== Players ==
=== Current squad ===
BC Dnipro roster
Players
Coaches

Pos.	No.	Nat.	Name	Ht.	Wt.	Age
PG	2	(Ukraine)	Popov, Ivan	1.88 m (6 ft 2 in)	72 kg (159 lb)	22 – 30 July 2003
G	4	(United States)	Williamson, C.J.	1.97 m (6 ft 6 in)	98 kg (216 lb)	25 – 9 May 2000
C	7	(Ukraine)	Druzheliubov, Ivan	2.14 m (7 ft 0 in)		20 – 7 September 2005
SG	8	(Ukraine)	Sorochan, Yevhenii	1.93 m (6 ft 4 in)	75 kg (165 lb)	25 – 7 August 2000
C	10	(Netherlands)	Osaikhwuwuomwan, Craig	2.11 m (6 ft 11 in)	105 kg (231 lb)	34 – 12 October 1990
SF	11	(Ukraine)	Dubonenko, Ihor	1.98 m (6 ft 6 in)	87 kg (192 lb)	27 – 11 January 1998
C	17	(Nigeria)	Orizu, Prince	2.08 m (6 ft 10 in)	112 kg (247 lb)	31 – 10 August 1994
PF	21	(Ukraine)	Tymofeyenko, Stanislav	2.06 m (6 ft 9 in)	103 kg (227 lb)	36 – 3 June 1989
G	23	(Ukraine)	Popov, Danylo	1.92 m (6 ft 4 in)		17 – 25 March 2008
F	24	(Ukraine)	Koniev, Volodymyr	2.03 m (6 ft 8 in)	87 kg (192 lb)	36 – 18 June 1989
PG	33	(Ukraine)	Zakurdaev, Maksym	1.97 m (6 ft 6 in)	97 kg (214 lb)	32 – 16 June 1993
PG	98	(Ukraine)	Gorobchenko, Michael	1.98 m (6 ft 6 in)	82 kg (181 lb)	27 – 10 January 1998

Head coach

- (Ukraine) Denys Zhuravliov

Assistant coach(es)

- (Ukraine) Pavlo Agapov

Legend

- (C) Team captain
- Injured

- Roster
Updated: November 28, 2021

=== Notable players ===
Note: Flags indicate national team eligibility at FIBA-sanctioned events. Players may hold other non-FIBA nationalities not displayed.

Criteria

To appear in this section a player must have either:

- Set a club record or won an individual award while at the club
- Played at least one official international match for their national team at any time
- Played at least one official NBA match at any time.

- (United States) Jared Terrell
- (Ukraine) Viacheslav Kravtsov
- (Ukraine) Alex Len
- (Ukraine) (United States) Steve Burtt
- (Ukraine) (United States) Eugene Jeter
- (Canada) Denham Brown
- (United States) Patrick Beverley
- (United States) Mario Austin
- (United States) Qyntel Woods
- (United States) Darnell Lazare
- (Lithuania) Donatas Zavackas
- (Lithuania) Tautvydas Lydeka
