= BC Dnipro-Azot =

Dnipro-Azot
- Leagues: Ukrainian Basketball SuperLeague
- Founded: 2005
- Dissolved: 2015
- Arena: Tennis Palace Anoshkina
- Capacity: 1,000
- Location: Dniprodzerzhynsk, Ukraine
- President: Hryhoriy Poturemets

BC Dnipro-Azot was a Ukrainian basketball club based in Dniprodzerzhynsk. Established in 2005, the team played in the Superleague. It was dissolved in 2015, ten years after its foundation. Its team colors were red and white.

== Season by season ==
Season	Tier	League	Pos.	Postseason	Ukrainian Cup	European competitions
2010–11	1	SuperLeague	9th	–	–	–
2011–12	1	SuperLeague	11th	–	–	–
2012–13	1	SuperLeague	13th	–	–	–
2013–14	1	SuperLeague	14th		Semifinalist	–
