= BC Zaporizhzhia =

- Nickname: ZP Basket
- Leagues: Ukrainian Basketball SuperLeague
- Founded: 1972; 54 years ago
- History: BC Ferro-ZNTU (till 2015); BC Zaporizhzhia (2015–present)
- Arena: Yunost Sport Hall
- Capacity: 3,600
- Location: Zaporizhzhia, Ukraine
- Team colors: Green and White
- Head coach: Kiril Bolshakov
- Championships: 2 Ukrainian Cups
- Website: bcferro.com.ua
| Home | Away |

BC Zaporizhia (Ukrainian: БК ЗАПОРІЖЖЯ) is a Ukrainian professional basketball club, based in Zaporizhzhia. The club was previously known as BC Ferro-ZNTU. The team played in Ukrainian SL Favorit Sport.

== Logos ==
The logo of BC Ferro-ZNTU

== Trophies ==
- Ukrainian Cup: 2

2010, 2013

== Season by season ==
| Season | Tier | League | Pos. | Ukrainian Cup | European competitions | |
BC Ferro-ZNTU
| 2009–10 | 1 | SuperLeague | 3rd | Champion | | |
| 2010–11 | 1 | SuperLeague | 4th | | 3 EuroChallenge | QR |
| 2011–12 | 1 | SuperLeague | 4th | Runner-up | | |
| 2012–13 | 1 | SuperLeague | 3rd | Champion | | |
| 2013–14 | 1 | SuperLeague | 5th | | | |
| 2014–15 | 1 | SuperLeague | 7th | Quarterfinalist | | |
BC Zaporizhya
| 2015–16 | 1 | SL Favorit Sport | 6th | Quarterfinalist | | |
| 2016–17 | 1 | SuperLeague | 6th | Quarterfinalist | | |
| 2017–18 | 1 | SuperLeague | 8th | Round of 16 | | |
| 2018–19 | 1 | SuperLeague | 3rd | Quarterfinalist | | |

== Players ==
=== Current squad ===
BC Zaporizhzhia roster
Players
Coaches

| Pos. | No. | Nat. | Name | Ht. | Wt. | Age |
|---|---|---|---|---|---|---|
| F | | (Ukraine) | Rahimov, Rustam | 1.88 m (6 ft 2 in) | 85 kg (187 lb) | 27 – 7 June 1999 |
| F | | (Ukraine) | Sorochan, Dmytro | 2.00 m (6 ft 7 in) | 103 kg (227 lb) | 28 – 6 August 1998 |
| PF | 1 | (Ukraine) | Lypovtsev, Dmytro | 2.03 m (6 ft 8 in) | 105 kg (231 lb) | 40 – 8 October 1986 |
| G | 2 | (Ukraine) | Kozhemiakin, Andrii | 1.90 m (6 ft 3 in) | 85 kg (187 lb) | 29 – 13 December 1996 |
| SG | 4 | (Ukraine) | Titov, Yakiv | 1.95 m (6 ft 5 in) | 85 kg (187 lb) | 27 – 29 August 1999 |
| PF | 9 | (Ukraine) | Sokolenko, Danylo | 2.03 m (6 ft 8 in) | 85 kg (187 lb) | 27 – 13 September 1999 |
| F | 11 | (Ukraine) | Shevchenko, Volodymyr | 2.00 m (6 ft 7 in) | 87 kg (192 lb) | 31 – 3 December 1994 |
| G | 13 | (United States) | Stallworth, Lew | 1.85 m (6 ft 1 in) | 91 kg (201 lb) | 30 – 29 May 1996 |
| PF | 14 | (Ukraine) | Mikhieiev, Ivan | 1.90 m (6 ft 3 in) | 82 kg (181 lb) | 27 – 14 January 1999 |
| C | 19 | (Ukraine) | Buts, Anton | 2.01 m (6 ft 7 in) | 115 kg (254 lb) | 38 – 13 May 1988 |
| C | 21 | (Ukraine) | Sandul, Maksym | 2.06 m (6 ft 9 in) | 105 kg (231 lb) | 35 – 20 February 1991 |
| SF | 23 | (United States) | Randolph, Brandon | 1.88 m (6 ft 2 in) | 87 kg (192 lb) | 31 – 26 May 1995 |
| PF | 24 | (Ukraine) | Morozov, Roman | 2.04 m (6 ft 8 in) | 87 kg (192 lb) | 27 – 24 October 1998 |
| PF | 44 | (Ukraine) | Myronenko, Andriy (C) | 2.00 m (6 ft 7 in) | 100 kg (220 lb) | 31 – 8 December 1994 |
| PG | –– | (United States) | Caffey, Mike | 1.83 m (6 ft 0 in) | 79 kg (174 lb) | 33 – 17 February 1993 |

Head coach

- (Ukraine) Valerii Plekhanov

Legend

- (C) Team captain
- Injured

- Roster
Updated: 12 July 2020

== Notable players ==
- (United States) Randy Culpepper 2 seasons: 2011–13
- (United States) Daeshon Francis
- (United States) R. T. Guinn 2 seasons: 2011–13
- (Ukraine) (United States) Steven Burtt 1 season: 2010
- (North Macedonia) Gjorgji Čekovski 1 season: 2009
