= BC Kyiv =

- Nickname: Wolves
- Leagues: Ukrainian SuperLeague
- Founded: 1999
- Dissolved: 2015
- History: BC Kyiv; 1999–2015
- Arena: Meridian Sports Complex (capacity: 1,500); Kyiv Sports Palace (capacity: 7,000)
- Location: Kyiv, Ukraine
- Team colors: Green, Yellow
- President: Vitali Khomenko
- Head coach: Renato Pasquali
- Championships: 2 Ukrainian Championships; 1 Ukrainian Cup
- Website: bckiev.com.ua
Home	Away

BC Kyiv (Ukrainian: БК "Київ") was a Ukrainian professional basketball club based in Kyiv. The club's home court for Ukrainian domestic league matches was the Meridian Sports Complex, which has a seating capacity of 1,500. Large attendance games and European-wide competition games were held at the 7,000 seat Kyiv Sports Palace.

== History ==
The club was founded in 1999. Kyiv won the Ukrainian SuperLeague in 2000 and 2005, and also reached the FIBA EuroCup final in 2005. Over this time, the club has also developed a huge rivalry with their city opponents Budivelnyk Kyiv.

== Season by season ==
Season	Domestic competitions			Ukrainian Cup	European competitions		
Season	Tier	League	Pos.	Ukrainian Cup	Tier	League	Result
2008–09	1	SuperLeague	4th	Runner-up	3	EuroChallenge	QF
2009–10	1	SuperLeague	4th	Runner-up	3	EuroChallenge	RS
2010–11	1	SuperLeague	13th		3	EuroChallenge	QR
2011–12	1	SuperLeague	9th				
2012–13	1	SuperLeague	14th				
2013–14	1	SuperLeague	8th		3	EuroChallenge	RS
2014–15	1	SuperLeague	4th	Semifinalist			

== Trophies ==
- Ukrainian SuperLeague (2):

(gold) Champions (2): 2000, 2005
(silver) Runners-up (6): 2001, 2002, 2004, 2006, 2007, 2008
(bronze) Third-place (1): 2003

- Ukrainian Cup (1):

(gold) Champions (1): 2007
(silver) Runners-up (3): 2006, 2008, 2010

- FIBA EuroCup (0):

(silver) Runners-up (1): 2005
(bronze) Third place (1): 2006

== Notable players ==
Note: Flags indicate national team eligibility at FIBA-sanctioned events. Players may hold other non-FIBA nationalities not displayed.

Criteria

To appear in this section a player must have either:

- Set a club record or won an individual award while at the club
- Played at least one official international match for their national team at any time
- Played at least one official NBA match at any time.

- (Israel) Afik Nissim
- (Ukraine) Hryhoriy Khyzhniak
- (Ukraine) Viacheslav Kravtsov
- (Ukraine) Oleksandr Lokhmanchuk
- (Ukraine) Oleksiy Pecherov
- (Ukraine) Oleksandr Volkov
- (Argentina) Marcelo Nicola
- (Bosnia and Herzegovina) Ratko Varda
- (Croatia) Krešimir Lončar
- (Croatia) Marcus Norris
- (Georgia (country)) Manuchar Markoishvili
- (Greece) Giannis Giannoulis
- (Lithuania) Rimas Kurtinaitis
- (Montenegro) Goran Nikolić
- (North Macedonia) Ryan Stack
- (Russia) Sergei Chikalkin
- (Serbia) Dušan Kecman
- (Serbia) Dragan Lukovski
- (United States) Gary Ervin
- (United States) LaMarr Greer
- (United States) Mike Harris
- (United States) Scoonie Penn
