= Ukrainian Basketball Cup =

Basketball competition in Ukraine

- Sport: Basketball
- Founded: 1992
- Country: Ukraine
- Continent: Europe
- Most recent champion: Dnipro (6th title)
- Most titles: Dnipro (6 titles)
- Related competitions: Ukrainian SL Favorit Sport; Ukrainian SuperLeague

The Ukrainian Basketball Cup (in Ukrainian: Кубок України з баскетболу) is an annual cup competition for basketball teams from Ukraine. The competition was founded in 1992.

== Finals ==
Season	Champions	Score	Runners-up	MVP	Arena	City	Ref.
2007	Kyiv			(Croatia) Damir Rančić			
2008	Azovmash (4)	73–63	Kyiv				
2009	Azovmash (5)	75–74	Kyiv	(United States) Khalid El-Amin			
2010	Ferro-ZNTU	82–74	Kyiv				
2011	Dnipro	81–79	Azovmash				
2012	Budivelnyk (2)		Ferro-ZNTU	(Ukraine) Vitaly Boyko		Sevastopol	
2013	Ferro-ZNTU (2)	87–69	Hoverla	(Ukraine) Oleksandr Rybalko	Palace of Sports	Lviv	
2014	Budivelnyk (3)	96–88	Donetsk	(Lithuania) Darjuš Lavrinovič	Palace of Sports	Kyiv	
2015	Budivelnyk (4)	73–60	Dnipro	(Ukraine) Maksym Pustozvonov	Palace of Sports	Kyiv	
2016	Khimik	71–51	Kryvbas	(Ukraine) Vladimir Konev	Palace of Sports	Kyiv	
2017	Dnipro (2)	86–82	Budivelnyk	(Ukraine) Stanyslav Tymofejenko	Palace of Sports	Kyiv	
2018	Dnipro (3)	78–71	Khimik	(Ukraine) Dmitry Glebov		Kharkiv	
2019	Dnipro (4)	74–69	Odesa	(Ukraine) Alexander Mishula	Palace of Sports Shynnik	Dnipro	
2020	Khimik (2)	78–77	Dnipro	(United States) Lewis Sullivan			
2021	Budivelnyk (5)	93–70	Cherkaski Mavpy	(United States) Steve Burtt Jr.	Palace of Sports	Kyiv	
2024	Dnipro (5)	65–64	Prometey	(Ukraine) Maksym Zakurdaev		Kyiv	
2025	Dnipro (6)	95–69	Rivne	(Ukraine) Stanislav Tymofeyenko		Dnipro	

== Titles by team ==
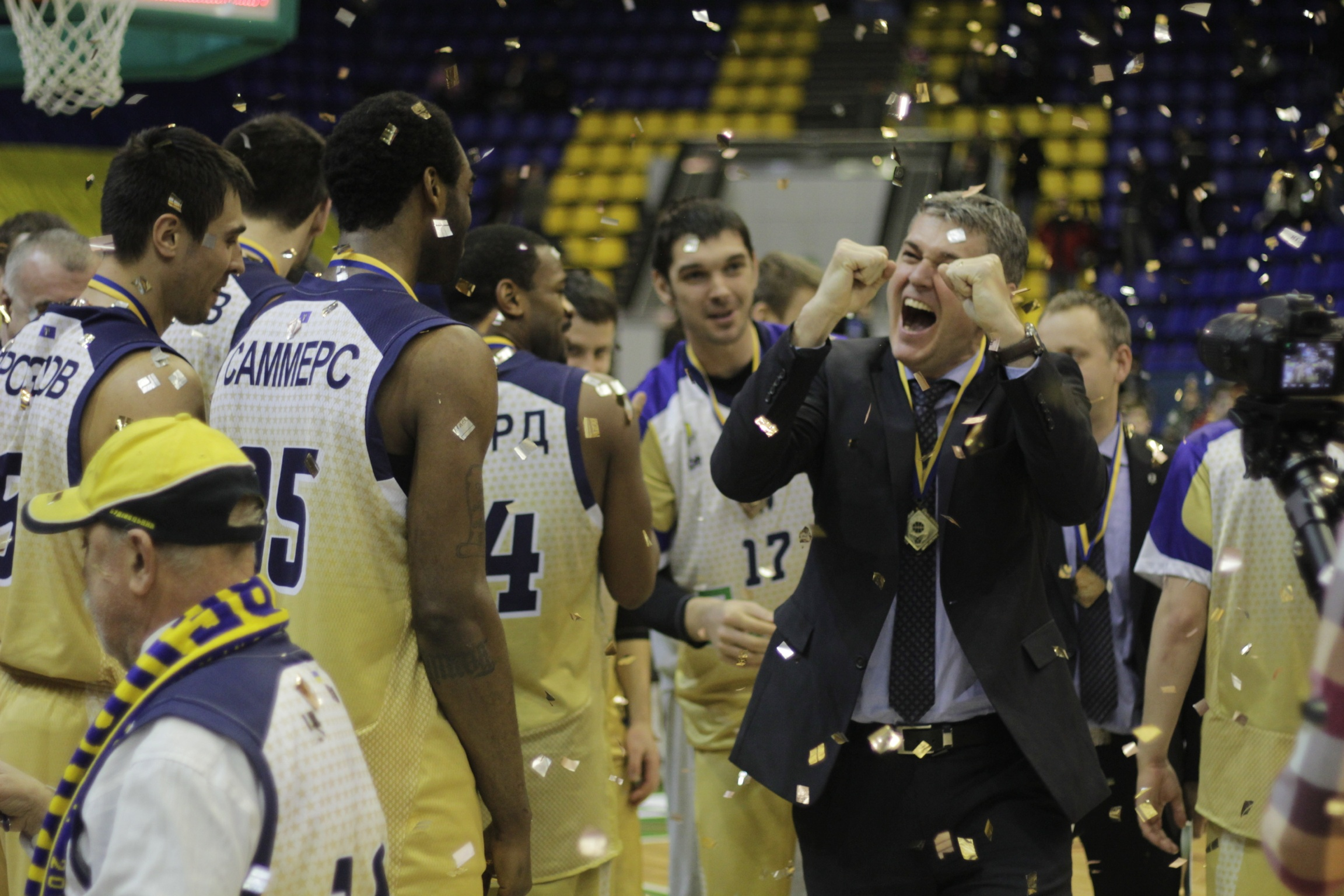
Budivelnyk celebrating after they won the 2014 Cup

Teams in italics are no longer active.

Club	Winners	Runners-up	Seasons won	Seasons runners-up
Dnipro	6	2	2011, 2017, 2018, 2019, 2024, 2025	2015, 2020
Mariupol (Note: MBK Mariupol was named "BC Azovmash" from 2009 until 2014.)	5	1	2001, 2002, 2006, 2008, 2009	2007, 2011
Budivelnyk	3	1	2012, 2014, 2015	2017
Khimik	2	1	2016, 2020	2018
BC Kyiv	1	3	2007	2006, 2008, 2010
Zaporizhya (Note: BC Zaporizhya was known as "BC Ferro-ZNTU" until 2015.)	1	1	2010	2012
Kryvbas	–	1	–	2016
Goverla	–	1	–	2013
Prometey	–	1	–	2024
Rivne	–	1	–	2025
