= BC Budivelnyk =

Budivelnyk
- Nickname: Konstruktor (Constructor); Budivel'nyk (Builder)
- Leagues: Ukrainian Basketball SuperLeague
- Founded: 1945; 81 years ago
- History: List: SKIF Kyiv (1945–1962) Stroitel (1962–1989) BC Budivelnyk (1989–2018; 2020–present)
- Arena: Kyiv Sports Palace
- Capacity: 7,000
- Location: Kyiv, Ukraine
- Team colors: Yellow, Blue, Navy
- President: Bohdan Guliamov
- Head coach: Valery Plekhanov
- Ownership: PrivatBank
- Championships: 1 Soviet Championship; 11 Ukrainian Championships; 3 Ukrainian Cups
- Website: budivelnyk.ua
Home	Away

BC Budivelnyk Kyiv (Ukrainian: Будівельник Київ) is a Ukrainian professional basketball club based in Kyiv. The club plays in the Ukrainian Basketball SuperLeague. In June 2018, it was forced to withdraw from the Superleague due to open debts. Two years later, the club returned. The club holds a record eleven Ukrainian championships and three Ukrainian cups, as well as a Soviet championship (1989).

Budivelnyk is owned and operated by the banking and investing company PrivatBank.

== History ==
Founded in the club's current form in 1962, the club was one of the leading clubs in Soviet League basketball. It was formed out of another team from Kyiv, SKIF, that was originally established in 1945. The team was established as a team of the Republican Trade Union Volunteer Sport Society Avanhard, under sponsorship of the local municipal building company Kyivmiskbud-4 (Kyiv-City-Construction-4). In Soviet times, the team played at the 7,000 seat Kyiv Sports Palace. The team won the Soviet League in 1989, and the Ukrainian League 11th times.

Following the team's long period of success, a period of time in which the team declined ensued, and it was relegated to the lower Ukrainian division, due to financial problems. However, in 2006, the team was rescued by a group of businessmen who invested considerable resources into it, thus allowing it to return to the top league of Ukrainian basketball. Within two years, the team once again became one of the strongest teams in Ukraine, finishing second in the Ukrainian National League.

BC Budivelnyk alternate 1962 logo.

In March 2010, the management of Budivelnyk held a joint press conference with the CEO and President of Euroleague Basketball Company, Jordi Bertomeu, announcing that they might join the EuroLeague in the next few years. Eventually, a wildcard was conceded to the team for the 2013–14 EuroLeague season.

On 21 June 2018, the FBU announced Budivelnyk was not allowed to participate in the Ukrainian Superleague due to debts with their players.

In the 2020 offseason, the Budivelnyk club restarted its activities and signed up for the 2020–21 SuperLeague season. Its transfer ban by the FIBA, which was enforced in 2018, was lifted.

=== Name ===
The original team played under the name of SKIF, from 1945 to 1962. The current team plays under the current name since 1962. The team's name means "Builder" in Ukrainian.

== Arena ==
BC Budivelnyk played their home games at Kyiv Sport Palace. It was built in 1960 and it has capacity of 7,000 seats.

== Current players ==
=== Current roster ===
Note: Flags indicate national team eligibility at FIBA-sanctioned events. Players may hold other non-FIBA nationalities not displayed.

BC Budivelnyk Kyiv roster
Players
Coaches

Pos.	No.	Nat.	Name	Ht.	Age
PG	1	(Lithuania)	Vasiliauskas, Šarūnas	1.88 m (6 ft 2 in)	37 – 27 March 1989
F/C	2	(United States)	Grant, Jerai	2.03 m (6 ft 8 in)	37 – 10 January 1989
SF	7	(Ukraine)	Grytsak, Andriy	2.01 m (6 ft 7 in)	26 – 12 June 2000
SG	8	(Canada)	Berhanemeskel, Johnny	1.88 m (6 ft 2 in)	33 – 30 October 1992
SG	10	(United States)	Goodwin, Archie	1.96 m (6 ft 5 in)	32 – 17 August 1994
SF	12	(Ukraine)	Krutous, Pavlo	1.94 m (6 ft 4 in)	34 – 9 April 1992
PF	13	(Ukraine)	Bobrov, Vyacheslav	2.03 m (6 ft 8 in)	34 – 19 September 1992
F/C	15	(United States)	Brown, Alec	2.16 m (7 ft 1 in)	34 – 23 July 1992
SF	21	(Cyprus)	Kolomoisky, Israel	1.96 m (6 ft 5 in)	27 – 27 January 1999
SG	34	(Ukraine)	Tyrtyshnik, Illya	1.91 m (6 ft 3 in)	28 – 7 September 1998
PG	45	(Ukraine)	Zotov, Vitaliy	1.88 m (6 ft 2 in)	29 – 3 March 1997
PF	51	(Ukraine)	Tykhonov, Dmytro	2.05 m (6 ft 9 in)	34 – 19 January 1992

Head coach

- (Ukraine) Valery Plekhanov

Assistant coach(es)

- (Ukraine) Leonid Yailo
- (Ukraine) Yanick Murry

Legend

- (C) Team captain
- Injured

- Roster
Updated: March 23, 2023

== Honors ==
- Soviet Union League (1):
  - Gold – 1989
  - Silver - 1965, 1966, 1977, 1979, 1981, 1982
  - Bronze – 1962, 1964, 1970, 1974, 1983, 1984, 1990
- Soviet Union Cup (0):
  - Runner Up - 1969, 1972
- Ukrainian SuperLeague (11):
  - Gold - 1992 - 1997, 2011, 2013, 2014, 2017, 2023
  - Silver - 1998, 2010
  - Bronze - 1999
- Ukrainian Cup (3):
  - Winner – 2012, 2014, 2015

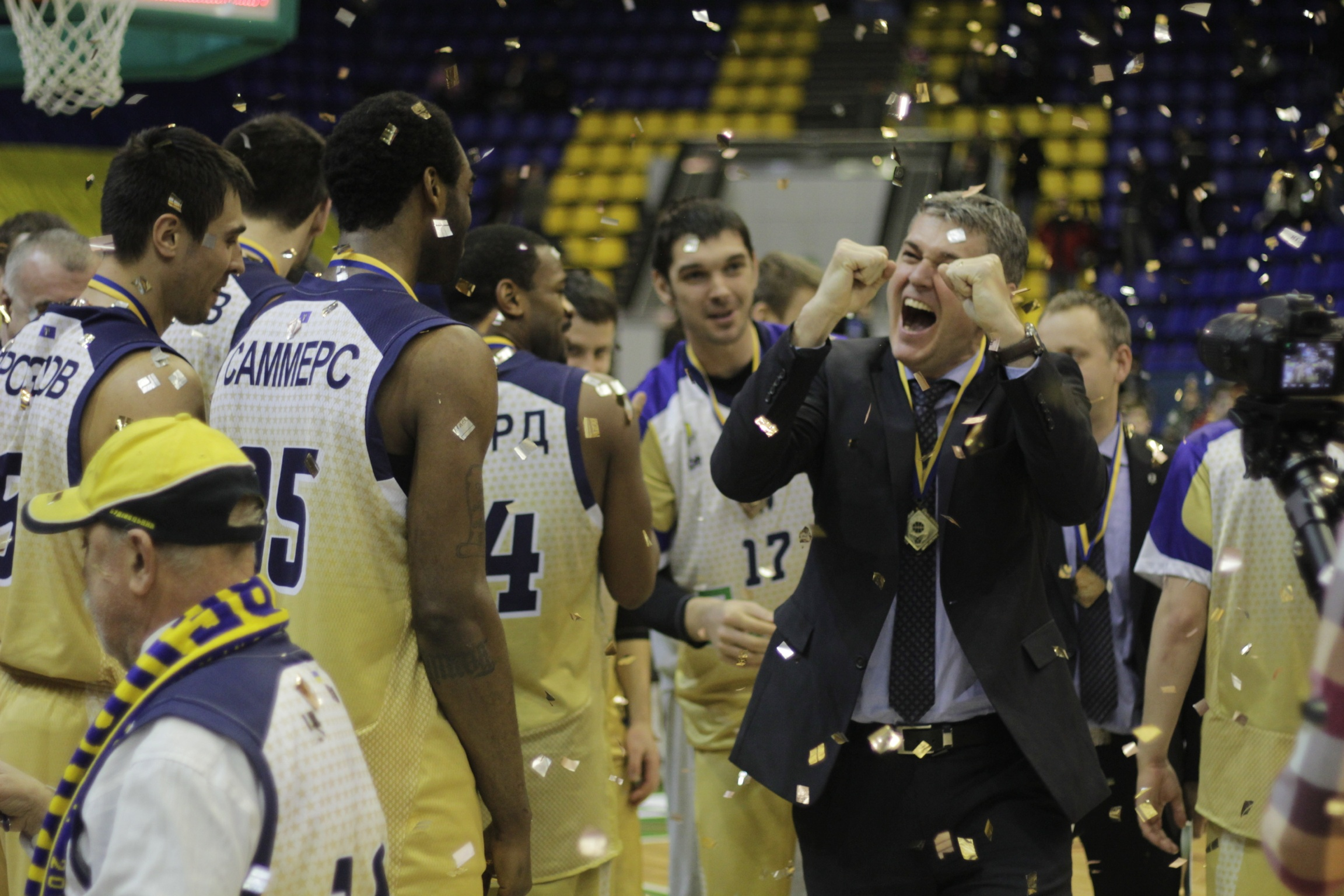
Ukrainian Cup Winners (2014)

== Season by season ==
Season	Tier	League	Pos.	Ukrainian Cup	Other competitions		European competitions	
2004–05	1	SuperLeague	7th					
2005–06	1	SuperLeague	9th					
2006–07	1	SuperLeague	10th					
2007–08	1	SuperLeague	10th					
2008–09	1	UBL	2nd	Winner (Note: In the 2008–09 season, Budivelnyk played in the UBL Cup tournament.)				
2009–10	1	SuperLeague	2nd	Semifinalist				
2010–11	1	SuperLeague	1st				1 Euroleague	QR2
2010–11	1	SuperLeague	1st				2 Eurocup	QF
2011–12	1	SuperLeague	4th	Winner	United League	RS		
2012–13	1	SuperLeague	1st				2 Eurocup	SF
2013–14	1	SuperLeague	1st	Champion			1 Euroleague	RS
2013–14	1	SuperLeague	1st	Champion			2 Eurocup	QF
2014–15	1	SuperLeague	3rd	Champion				
2015–16	1	SuperLeague	2nd					
2016–17	1	SuperLeague	1st	Runner-up				
2017–18	1	SuperLeague	5th	Quarterfinalist			3 Champions League	QR2
2018–20	Inactive							
2020–21	1	SuperLeague						

== Notable players ==
=== Notable players ===
Note: Flags indicate national team eligibility at FIBA-sanctioned events. Players may hold other non-FIBA nationalities not displayed.

Criteria

To appear in this section a player must have either:

- Set a club record or won an individual award while at the club
- Played at least one official international match for their national team at any time
- Played at least one official NBA match at any time.

- (Ukraine) Volodymyr Tkachenko
- (Ukraine) Oleksandr Bilostinny
- (Ukraine) Sasha Volkov
- (Ukraine) Anatoliy Polyvoda
- (Ukraine) Serhiy Kovalenko
- (Ukraine) Vitaly Potapenko
- (Ukraine) Anatolij Kovtun
- (Dominican Republic) Luis Flores
- (United Kingdom) Andrew Betts
- (Lithuania) Tomas Delininkaitis
- (Lithuania) Dainius Šalenga
- (Lithuania) Darjuš Lavrinovič
- (Lithuania) Šarūnas Vasiliauskas
- (Montenegro) Suad Šehović
- (United States) Cat Barber
- (United States) Maceo Baston
- (United States) Malcolm Delaney
- (United States) Khalid El-Amin
- (United States) Archie Goodwin
- (United States) Brice Johnson
- (United States) Leo Lyons
- (United States) Jack McClinton
- (United States) Derrick Zimmerman
- (United States) (Ukraine) Steve Burtt Jr.
