= Russian basketball clubs in international competitions =

Russian basketball clubs in European and worldwide competitions is the performance record of men's professional basketball clubs from Russia's various top-tier level leagues over the years, Super Liga A (1991–92 to 2009–10), Professional Basketball League (PBL) (2010–11 to 2012–13), and the VTB United League (2013–14 to present).

After the 2022 Russian invasion of Ukraine FIBA banned Russian teams and officials from participating in its competitions.

== History ==
Russian men's professional basketball clubs have played in European-wide basketball competitions since September 1992 (nine months after the dissolution of the Soviet Union on December 26, 1991), when CSKA Moscow took part in the FIBA European League (now called EuroLeague), Stroitel Samara in the FIBA European Cup and Avtodor Saratov in the FIBA Korać Cup. UNICS Kazan is the first Russian men's basketball club that won a European-wide competition trophy, the 2003–04 FIBA Europe League (now called EuroChallenge), a third-tier competition on the pyramid of European professional club basketball system. CSKA Moscow was also the first Russian men's basketball club that won the EuroLeague, in 2006, when the club beat the defending champions, Maccabi Tel Aviv, in the Finals, that took place in Prague, Czech Republic.

The same season (2005–06), a few days before the EuroLeague Final Four in Prague, Dynamo Moscow, under head coach Dušan Ivković, became the second Russian basketball club that won a European-wide competition trophy, after the defeated Aris TT Bank in the final of the ULEB Cup (now called EuroCup Basketball) in Spiroudome, Charleroi, Belgium. For the next decade, Russian basketball clubs won many trophies in all European-wide competitions.

After the 2022 Russian invasion of Ukraine, FIBA banned Russian teams and officials from participating in FIBA 3x3 Basketball competitions.

== The finals ==
Season	Champion	Result	Runner-up	Date	Venue	
FIBA European League & EuroLeague (1st tier)
2005–06	CSKA Moscow (Russia)	73–69	(Israel) Maccabi Tel Aviv	30/04/2006	Sazka Arena, Prague	
2006–07	Panathinaikos (Greece)	93–91	(Russia) CSKA Moscow	06/05/2007	OAKA, Athens	
2007–08	CSKA Moscow (Russia)	91–77	(Israel) Maccabi Tel Aviv	04/05/2008	Palacio de Deportes de la Comunidad de Madrid, Madrid	
2008–09	Panathinaikos (Greece)	73–71	(Russia) CSKA Moscow	03/05/2009	O2 World, Berlin	
2011–12	Olympiacos (Greece)	62–61	(Russia) CSKA Moscow	13/05/2012	Sinan Erdem Dome, Istanbul	
2015–16	CSKA Moscow (Russia)	101–96 (OT)	(Turkey) Fenerbahçe	15/05/2016	Mercedes-Benz Arena, Berlin	
2018–19	CSKA Moscow (Russia)	91–83	(Turkey) Anadolu Efes	19/05/2019	Fernando Buesa Arena, Vitoria-Gasteiz	
EuroCup Basketball (2nd tier)
2005–06	Dynamo Moscow (Russia)	73–60	(Greece) Aris TT Bank	11/04/2006	Spiroudome, Charleroi	
2008–09	Lietuvos rytas (Lithuania)	80–74	(Russia) Khimki	13/04/2009	Pala Alpitour, Turin	
2010–11	UNICS (Russia)	92–77	(Spain) Cajasol	17/04/2011	PalaVerde, Treviso	
2011–12	Khimki (Russia)	77–68	(Spain) Valencia Basket	15/04/2012	Basketball Center, Khimki	
2012–13	Lokomotiv Kuban (Russia)	75–64	(Spain) Uxúe Bilbao Basket	13/04/2013	RTL Spiroudome, Charleroi	
2013–14	Valencia Basket (Spain)	165–140 (two-leg)	(Russia) UNICS	01 & 07/05/2014	... Font de San Lluís, Valencia	Basket-Hall, Kazan
2014–15	Khimki (Russia)	174–130 (two-leg)	(Spain) Herbalife Gran Canaria	24 & 29/04/2014	Gran Canaria Arena, Las Palmas	Basketball Center, Khimki
2017–18	Darüşşafaka (Turkey)	2–0 Play-off	(Russia) Lokomotiv Kuban	10 & 13/04/2018	Basket-Hall, Krasnodar	Volkswagen Arena, Istanbul
FIBA Korać Cup (3rd tier)
2001–02	SLUC Nancy (France)	172–167 (two-leg)	(Russia) Lokomotiv Mineralnye Vody	10 & 17/04/2002	Palais des Sports Jean Weille, Nancy	SK Ekspress, Rostov-on-Don
FIBA EuroChallenge (3rd tier)
2003–04	UNICS (Russia)	87–63	(Greece) Maroussi TIM	24/04/2004	Basket-Hall, Kazan	
2004–05	Dynamo Saint Petersburg (Russia)	85–74	(Ukraine) Kyiv	28/04/2005	Abdi İpekçi Arena, Istanbul	
2005–06	DKV Joventut (Spain)	88–63	(Russia) Khimki	09/04/2006	Palace of Sports, Kyiv	
2009–10	Göttingen (Germany)	83–75	(Russia) Krasnye Krylia	02/05/2010	Lokhalle Göttingen, Göttingen	
2010–11	Krka (Slovenia)	83–77	(Russia) Lokomotiv Kuban	01/05/2011	Sleuyter Arena, Ostend	
2012–13	Krasnye Krylia (Russia)	77–76	(Turkey) Pinar Karşıyaka	28/04/2013	Karşıyaka Arena, İzmir	
2013–14	Grissin Bon Reggio Emilia (Italy)	79–65	(Russia) Triumph Lyubertsy	27/04/2014	PalaDozza, Bologna	
FIBA EuroCup Challenge (4th tier)
2004–05	Asesoft Ploiești (Romania)	75–74	(Russia) Lokomotiv Rostov	10/04/2005	Sala Sporturilor Olimpia, Ploiești	
2005–06	Ural Great Perm (Russia)	154–147 (two-leg)	(Ukraine) Khimik	16 & 23/03/2006	Dvorets Sporta, Yuzhne	Universal Sports Palace Molot, Perm
2006–07	CSK VVS Samara (Russia)	184–166 (two-leg)	(Cyprus) Keravnos	22 & 29/03/2007	Costas Papaellinas Arena, Nicosia	Sport CSK VSS, Samara

== EuroLeague (1st-tier) ==
=== Season to season ===
Year	Team	_______ Earlier stage _______	________ Last 24 to 32 ________	________ Last 12 to 16 ________	_________ Last 6 to 8 _________	_________ Semifinals _________	____________ Final ____________
1992–93	CSKA Moscow	(Netherlands) Commodore Den Helder	(Croatia) Zadar				
1993–94	CSKA Moscow	(Slovenia) Smelt Olimpija					
1994–95	CSKA Moscow	(Romania) Dinamo București	(France) Olympique Antibes	3rd of 8 teams	(Greece) Olympiacos		
1995–96	CSKA Moscow		(Switzerland) Fidefinanz Bellinzona	1st of 8 teams	(France) Pau-Orthez	(Greece) Panathinaikos	(Spain) Real Madrid Teka
1996–97	CSKA Moscow	2nd of 6 teams	5th of 6 teams				
1996–97	Dynamo Moscow	6th of 6 teams	6th of 6 teams				
1997–98	CSKA Moscow	4th of 6 teams	2nd of 6 teams	(Spain) FC Barcelona	(Federal Republic of Yugoslavia) Partizan		
1998–99	CSKA Moscow	3rd of 6 teams	3rd of 6 teams	(Turkey) Efes Pilsen			
1998–99	Avtodor Saratov	6th of 6 teams	6th of 6 teams				
1998–99	CSK VVS Samara	6th of 6 teams	6th of 6 teams				
1999–00	CSKA Moscow	2nd of 6 teams	2nd of 6 teams	(Croatia) Cibona			
2000–01	CSKA Moscow		2nd of 10 teams	(Belgium) Telindus Oostende	(France) ASVEL	(Israel) Maccabi Tel Aviv	(Turkey) Efes Pilsen (4th)
2000–01	Saint Petersburg Lions		5th of 6 teams				
2001–02	Ural Great Perm		3rd of 8 teams	4th of 4 teams			
2001–02	CSKA Moscow		4th of 8 teams	3rd of 4 teams			
2002–03	CSKA Moscow		1st of 8 teams	1st of 4 teams	Bye	(Spain) FC Barcelona	(Italy) Montepaschi Siena (4th)
2003–04	CSKA Moscow		1st of 8 teams	1st of 4 teams	Bye	(Israel) Maccabi Tel Aviv	(Italy) Montepaschi Siena
2004–05	CSKA Moscow		1st of 8 teams	1st of 4 teams	(Turkey) Ülker	(Spain) Tau Cerámica	(Greece) Panathinaikos (4th)
2005–06	CSKA Moscow		3rd of 8 teams	1st of 4 teams	(Turkey) Efes Pilsen	(Spain) Winterthur FC Barcelona	(Israel) Maccabi Tel Aviv
2006–07	CSKA Moscow		1st of 8 teams	1st of 4 teams	(Israel) Maccabi Tel Aviv	(Spain) Unicaja	(Greece) Panathinaikos
2006–07	Dynamo Moscow		2nd of 8 teams	2nd of 4 teams	(Greece) Panathinaikos		
2007–08	CSKA Moscow		1st of 8 teams	1st of 4 teams	(Greece) Olympiacos	(Spain) Tau Cerámica	(Israel) Maccabi Tel Aviv
2008–09	CSKA Moscow		1st of 6 teams	1st of 4 teams	(Serbia) Partizan	(Spain) Regal FC Barcelona	(Greece) Panathinaikos
2009–10	CSKA Moscow		1st of 6 teams	1st of 4 teams	(Spain) Caja Laboral	(Spain) Regal FC Barcelona	(Serbia) Partizan
2009–10	Khimki		3rd of 6 teams	3rd of 4 teams			
2010–11	CSKA Moscow		6th of 6 teams				
2010–11	Khimki		5th of 6 teams				
2011–12	CSKA Moscow		1st of 6 teams	1st of 4 teams	(Spain) Gescrap Bizkaia Bilbao	(Greece) Panathinaikos	(Greece) Olympiacos
2011–12	UNICS		3rd of 6 teams	2nd of 4 teams	(Spain) FC Barcelona Regal		
2012–13	CSKA Moscow		2nd of 6 teams	1st of 8 teams	(Spain) Laboral Kutxa	(Greece) Olympiacos	(Spain) FC Barcelona Regal
2012–13	Khimki		2nd of 6 teams	5th of 8 teams			
2013–14	CSKA Moscow		2nd of 6 teams	1st of 8 teams	(Greece) Panathinaikos	(Israel) Maccabi Tel Aviv	(Spain) FC Barcelona (4th)
2013–14	Lokomotiv Kuban		3rd of 6 teams	5th of 8 teams			
2014–15	CSKA Moscow		1st of 6 teams	1st of 8 teams	(Greece) Panathinaikos	(Greece) Olympiacos	(Turkey) Fenerbahçe Ülker
2014–15	Nizhny Novgorod		4th of 6 teams	8th of 8 teams			
2014–15	UNICS		5th of 6 teams				
2015–16	CSKA Moscow		1st of 6 teams	1st of 8 teams	(Serbia) Crvena zvezda Telekom	(Russia) Lokomotiv Kuban	(Turkey) Fenerbahçe
2015–16	Khimki		2nd of 6 teams	5th of 8 teams			
2015–16	Lokomotiv Kuban		1st of 6 teams	2nd of 8 teams	(Spain) FC Barcelona Lassa	(Russia) CSKA Moscow	(Spain) Laboral Kutxa
2016–17	CSKA Moscow			2nd of 16 teams	(Spain) Baskonia	(Greece) Olympiacos	(Spain) Real Madrid
2016–17	UNICS			15th of 16 teams			
2017–18	CSKA Moscow			1st of 16 teams	(Russia) Khimki	(Spain) Real Madrid	(Lithuania) Žalgiris (4th)
2017–18	Khimki			8th of 16 teams	(Russia) CSKA Moscow		
2018–19	CSKA Moscow			2nd of 16 teams	(Spain) Kirolbet Baskonia	(Spain) Real Madrid	(Turkey) Anadolu Efes
2018–19	Khimki			13th of 16 teams			

== FIBA Saporta Cup (2nd-tier) ==
=== Season to season ===
Year	Team	_______ Earlier stage _______	___________ Last 48 ___________	________ Last 24 to 32 ________	________ Last 12 to 16 ________	_________ Last 6 to 8 _________	_________ Semifinals _________	____________ Final ____________
1992–93	Stroitel Samara		(Netherlands) Pro-Specs EBBC					
1992–93	CSKA Moscow			(Czechoslovakia) USK Praha	4th of 6 teams			
1993–94	Spartak Saint Petersburg		(Poland) Nobiles Włocławek					
1994–95	Avtodor Saratov	(Latvia) Bonus						
1995–96	Dynamo Moscow		(Lithuania) Olimpas	(Romania) CSU Sibiu	2nd of 6 teams	Bye	(Spain) Taugrés	
1996–97	Avtodor Saratov		1st of 6 teams	(England) London Towers	(Poland) Śląsk Wrocław			
1996–97	Akvarius Volgograd		5th of 6 teams					
1997–98	Avtodor Saratov		2nd of 6 teams	(Hungary) Marc-Körmend	(Germany) Tatami Rhöndorf	(Russia) Samara	(Lithuania) Žalgiris	
1997–98	Samara		2nd of 6 teams	(Poland) Mazowzanka	(Finland) Torpan Pojat	(Russia) Avtodor Saratov		
1998–99	UNICS		2nd of 6 teams	(Latvia) Ventspils				
1998–99	Spartak Moscow		6th of 6 teams					
1999–00	Avtodor Saratov		6th of 6 teams					
1999–00	Arsenal Tula		5th of 6 teams					
2000–01	UNICS			1st of 6 teams	(Israel) Hapoel Galil Elyon	(Belgium) Telindus Racing Antwerpen	(Greece) Maroussi	
2001–02	UNICS			3rd of 6 teams	(Greece) Iraklis Thessaloniki	(Italy) Montepaschi Siena		

== FIBA Korać Cup (3rd-tier) ==
=== Season to season ===
Year	Team	_______ Earlier stage _______	________ Last 64 to 48 ________	________ Last 24 to 32 ________	________ Last 12 to 16 ________	_________ Last 6 to 8 _________	_________ Semifinals _________	____________ Final ____________
1992–93	Avtodor Saratov		(Slovenia) Helios Suns	(Italy) Phonola Caserta				
1993–94	Dynamo Moscow		(Ukraine) Korabel' Nikolaev	(Italy) Stefanel Trieste				
1993–94	Stroitel Samara		(Czech Republic) Nová huť Ostrava	(Greece) PAOK Bravo				
1994–95	CSK VVS Samara	(Georgia (country)) Cactus Tbilisi	(Ukraine) Korabel' Nikolaev	(Greece) Nikas Peristeri				
1994–95	Dynamo Moscow		(Romania) CSU Sibiu	(Greece) Aris Intersalonika	4th of 4 teams			
1994–95	Spartak Moscow		(North Macedonia) Kočani Delikates	(Italy) illycafe Trieste				
1994–95	Stroitel Samara	(Finland) NMKY Lahti	(Germany) Ratiopharm Ulm					
1995–96	CSK VVS Samara		(North Macedonia) MZT Skopje	(Spain) Amway Zaragoza				
1995–96	Avtodor Saratov	(Sweden) Planja Basket	(Lithuania) Atletas	(Germany) Alba Berlin				
1995–96	Akvarius Volgograd	(Federal Republic of Yugoslavia) Crvena zvezda	(Slovenia) Bavaria Wolltex					
1996–97	CSK VVS Samara		2nd of 4 teams	(Croatia) Benston Zagreb				
1996–97	Samara		2nd of 4 teams	(Italy) Rolly Pistoia				
1996–97	Spartak Saint Petersburg		4th of 4 teams					
1997–98	Lokomotiv Kazan		3rd of 4 teams					
1997–98	Spartak Moscow		2nd of 4 teams	(Italy) Varese Roosters				
1997–98	Shakhtjor Irkutsk		3rd of 4 teams					
1998–99	Spartak Saint Petersburg		3rd of 4 teams					
1998–99	Arsenal Tula		1st of 4 teams	(Greece) Iraklio Minoan Lines	(Italy) Aeroporti di Roma Virtus	(Spain) Adecco Estudiantes		
1998–99	Lokomotiv Mineralnye Vody		3rd of 4 teams					
1999–00	Ural Great Perm		3rd of 4 teams					
1999–00	UNICS		2nd of 4 teams	(France) Limoges CSP				
1999–00	Lokomotiv Mineralnye Vody		2nd of 4 teams	(Italy) Aeroporti di Roma Virtus				
2000–01	Avtodor Saratov		(Bulgaria) CSKA Sofia	1st of 4 teams	(Netherlands) Ricoh Astronauts			
2000–01	Khimki		(Sweden) Sundsvall Dragons	3rd of 4 teams				
2000–01	Lokomotiv Mineralnye Vody		(Sweden) Södertälje Kings	2nd of 4 teams	(Poland) Prokom Trefl Sopot			
2000–01	Spartak Saint Petersburg		(Finland) Kouvot	3rd of 4 teams				
2000–01	Shakhtjor Irkutsk		(Belarus) Grodno 93	4th of 4 teams				
2001–02	Avtodor Saratov		(Georgia (country)) Maccabi Brinkford Tbilisi	1st of 4 teams	(Slovenia) Pivovarna Laško			
2001–02	Khimki		(Bulgaria) Lukoil Academic	3rd of 4 teams				
2001–02	Lokomotiv Mineralnye Vody		(Romania) West Petrom Arad	1st of 4 teams	(Hungary) Atomerőmű	(Poland) Prokom Trefl Sopot	(Greece) Maroussi Telestet	(France) SLUC Nancy
2001–02	EvrAz		(Turkey) Fenerbahçe	4th of 4 teams				

== See also ==
European basketball clubs in European and worldwide competitions from:

- Czechoslovakia
- France
- Greece
- Italy
- Spain
- Turkey
- USSR
- Yugoslavia
