= BC Brno in international competitions =

BC Brno history and statistics in FIBA Europe and Euroleague Basketball (company) competitions.

== European competitions ==
Record	Round	Opponent club		
1958–59 FIBA European Champions Cup 1st–tier
3–1	1st round	(Austria) Engelmann Wien	96–56 h	92–69 a
3–1	2nd round	(Poland) Lech Poznań	63–87 a	85–68 h
1962–63 FIBA European Champions Cup 1st–tier
6–2	1st round	(Belgium) Antwerpse	81–74 a	88–57 h
6–2	2nd round	(Finland) Helsingin Kisa-Toverit	87–83 a	85–59 h
6–2	QF	(Socialist Federal Republic of Yugoslavia) AŠK Olimpija	83–86 a	79–72 h
6–2	SF	(Spain) Real Madrid	79–60 h	67–90 a
1963–64 FIBA European Champions Cup 1st–tier
6–4	1st round	(Austria) Wiener AC	105–71 a	79–62 h
6–4	2nd round	(Israel) Maccabi Tel Aviv	58–60 a	96–51 h
6–4	QF	(Romania) Steaua București	92–94 a	104–75 h
6–4	SF	(Socialist Federal Republic of Yugoslavia) OKK Beograd	94–103 a	85–75 h
6–4	F	(Spain) Real Madrid	110–99, April 27, Zimní stadion, Brno; 64–84, May 10, Fiesta Alegre fronton, Madrid	
1964–65 FIBA European Champions Cup 1st–tier
3–1	2nd round	(East Germany) Chemie Halle	82–76 a	73–66 h
3–1	QF	(Italy) Ignis Varese	84–90 a	72–67 h
1966–67 FIBA European Cup Winners' Cup 2nd–tier
4–2	2nd round	(Luxembourg) Diekirch	94–69 a	116–101 h
4–2	QF	(Belgium) Royal IV	88–76 a	91–69 h
4–2	SF	(Italy) Ignis Varese	83–84 h	53–58 a
1967–68 FIBA European Champions Cup 1st–tier
7–4	2nd round	(Turkey) Altınordu	65–61 a	102–69 h
7–4	QF	(Spain) Real Madrid	78–85 a	113–97 h
7–4	QF	(Belgium) Racing Bell Mechelen	76–67 h	79–80 a
7–4	QF	(Israel) Maccabi Tel Aviv	105–76 h	88–77 a
7–4	SF	(Italy) Simmenthal Milano	63–64 a	103–86 h
7–4	F	(Spain) Real Madrid	95–98; April 11, Palais des Sports de Gerland, Lyon	
1968–69 FIBA European Champions Cup 1st–tier
6–4	2nd round	(Romania) Dinamo București	85–100 a	96–69 h
6–4	QF	(Italy) Oransoda Cantù	60–69 a	82–68 h
6–4	QF	(Israel) Maccabi Tel Aviv	78–88 a	75–61 h
6–4	QF	(Belgium) Standard Liège	105–81 h	102–90 a
6–4	SF	(Soviet Union) CSKA Moscow	66–101 a	92–83 h
1971–72 FIBA European Cup Winners' Cup 2nd–tier
2–2	1st round	(Luxembourg) Arantia Larochette	111–65 h	113–85 a
2–2	2nd round	(Italy) Fides Napoli	69–76 h	82–92 a
1972–73 FIBA European Cup Winners' Cup 2nd–tier
4–4	1st round	(Austria) Mounier Wels	107–73 h	82–83 a
4–4	2nd round	(Greece) Olympiacos	94–87 a	76–74 h
4–4	QF	(Italy) Mobilquattro Milano	83–109 a	79–75 h
4–4	QF	(Soviet Union) Spartak Leningrad	74–82 h	77–82 a
1973–74 FIBA European Cup Winners' Cup 2nd–tier
7–4	1st round	(England) Embassy All-Stars	103–84 a	123–76 h
7–4	2nd round	(Belgium) Royal IV	96–94 a	114–83 h
7–4	QF	(Romania) Steaua București	96–86 h	64–77 a
7–4	QF	(Spain) Estudiantes Monteverde	72–74 a	117–93 h
7–4	SF	(Italy) Saclà Asti	70–86 a	88–71 h
7–4	F	(Socialist Federal Republic of Yugoslavia) Crvena zvezda	75–86; April 2, Palasport Primo Carnera, Udine	
1976–77 FIBA European Champions Cup 1st–tier
3–11	1st round	(Socialist Federal Republic of Yugoslavia) Partizan	96–85 a	93–100 h
3–11	1st round	(Egypt) Al-Gezira	Al-Gezira withdrew without games	
3–11	1st round	(Bulgaria) Academic	82–73 h	101–76 a
3–11	SF	(Israel) Maccabi Tel Aviv	01–02 a	76–91 h
3–11	SF	(Italy) Mobilgirgi Varese	73–110 a	77–84 h
3–11	SF	(Spain) Real Madrid	93–120 h	103–107 a
3–11	SF	(Soviet Union) CSKA Moscow	81–99 h	93–106 a
3–11	SF	(Belgium) Maes Pils	60–61 a	83–89 h
1977–78 FIBA European Champions Cup 1st–tier
4–2	1st round	(Turkey) Eczacıbaşı	90–98 a	86–64 h
4–2	1st round	(Sweden) Alvik	110–98 h	73–88 a
4–2	1st round	(Austria) Shopping Centre Wien	116–107 a	110–102 h
1978–79 FIBA European Champions Cup 1st–tier
4–2	1st round	(Albania) Partizani Tirana	79–100 a	104–83 h
4–2	1st round	(Cyprus) AEL	99–50 a	125–68 h
4–2	1st round	(Socialist Federal Republic of Yugoslavia) Bosna	90–89 h	97–105 a
1980–81 FIBA Korać Cup 3rd–tier
3–5	2nd round	(France) Stade Français	95–75 h	74–76 a
3–5	Top 16	(Socialist Federal Republic of Yugoslavia) Jugoplastika	90–96 h	110–102 a
3–5	Top 16	(Greece) Aris	87–101 a	114–83 h
3–5	Top 16	(Italy) Carrera Venezia	77–90 a	109–110 h
1981–82 FIBA Korać Cup 3rd–tier
1–1	2nd round	(Italy) Latte Sole Bologna	86–104 a	60–59 h
1986–87 FIBA European Champions Cup 1st–tier
1–3	1st round	(Sweden) Alvik	110–95 a	96–98 h
1–3	2nd round	(Spain) Real Madrid	70–82 h	91–132 a
1987–88 FIBA European Champions Cup 1st–tier
1–3	1st round	(England) Portsmouth	94–76 h	95–97 a
1–3	2nd round	(Netherlands) Nashua EBBC	78–87 a	83–97 h
1988–89 FIBA European Champions Cup 1st–tier
1–3	1st round	(Turkey) Eczacıbaşı	66–79 a	79–62 h
1–3	2nd round	(France) Limoges CSP	87–111 h	54–129 a
1990–91 FIBA European Champions Cup 1st–tier
0–2	1st round	(Sweden) Scania Södertälje	82–94 a	59–68 h
1991–92 FIBA Korać Cup 3rd–tier
1–1	1st round	(Germany) TBB Trier	62–98 a	102–80 h
1992–93 FIBA European Cup 2nd–tier
0–2	1st round	(Netherlands) Pro-Specs EBBC	73–101 h	62–88 a
1993–94 FIBA European Cup 2nd–tier
0–2	2nd round	(Italy) Olitalia Siena	87–98 h	78–91 a
1994–95 FIBA European League 1st–tier
2–2	1st round	(Luxembourg) Résidence	89–73 a	79–53 h
2–2	2nd round	(France) Limoges CSP	52–71 h	57–84 a
1994–95 FIBA European Cup 2nd–tier
0–2	3rd round	(Israel) Hapoel Tel Aviv	72–79 h	66–86 a
1995–96 FIBA European League 1st–tier
1–1	1st round	(Switzerland) Fidefinanz Bellinzona	106–93 h	69–93 a
1996–97 FIBA EuroCup 2nd–tier
5–7	1st round	(Greece) Apollon Patras Dexim	71–92 a	76–84 h
5–7	1st round	(Romania) Universitatea Cluj	96–74 a	109–79 h
5–7	1st round	(Russia) Aquarius	108–80 h	68–80 a
5–7	1st round	(Belgium) Sunair Oostende	65–70 h	79–78 a
5–7	1st round	(Ukraine) Budivelnyk	57–76 a	93–102 h
5–7	2nd round	(Greece) Iraklis Thessaloniki	86–78 h	61–76 a
2001–02 FIBA Korać Cup 3rd–tier
0–2	2nd round	(Poland) Prokom Trefl Sopot	84–103 h	60–105 a
2003–04 FIBA Europe Cup 4th–tier
4–4	Regular season	(Switzerland) Boncourt	87–75 h	80–92 a
4–4	Regular season	(Germany) TSK Würzburg	72–98 a	81–73 h
4–4	QF	(Hungary) Kaposvári	73–83 a	65–54 h
4–4	SF	(Hungary) Debreceni Vadkakasok	86–89; February 28, Főnix Hall, Central Conference Final stage Debrecen	
4–4	3rd place game	(Germany) TSK Würzburg	95–84; February 29, Főnix Hall, Central Conference Final stage Debrecen	
2004–05 FIBA Europe Cup 4th–tier
2–4	Regular season	(Portugal) Os Belenenses	78–80 a	97–84 h
2–4	Regular season	(Hungary) Albacomp-UPC	105–97 h	80–86 a
2–4	Regular season	(Switzerland) Boncourt	88–92 a	73–85 h
2005–06 FIBA EuroCup Challenge 4th–tier
1–3	Regular season	(Croatia) Dubrovnik	78–80 a	97–84 h
1–3	Regular season	(Cyprus) Apollon Limassol	73–85 h	46–79 a
2006–07 FIBA EuroCup Challenge 4th–tier
3–3	Regular season	(Cyprus) Keravnos	68–70 h	86–90 a
3–3	Regular season	(Switzerland) Boncourt	71–64 a	87–73 h
3–3	Regular season	(Romania) U-Mobitelco Cluj-Napoca	96–64 h	62–79 a

== Worldwide competitions ==
Record	Round	Opponent club	
1969 FIBA Intercontinental Cup
1–1	SF	(Spain) Real Madrid	84–77; January 25, Macon Coliseum, Macon
1–1	F	(United States) Akron Goodyear Wingfoots	71–84; January 26, Macon Coliseum, Macon

== Record ==
BC Brno has overall, from 1958–59 (first participation) to 2006–07 (last participation): 85 wins against 93 defeats in 178 games for all the European club competitions.

- EuroLeague: 48–45 (93)
  - FIBA Saporta Cup: 22–25 (47)
    - FIBA Korać Cup: 5–9 (14)
      - FIBA EuroCup Challenge: 10–14 (24)

== See also ==
- Czechoslovak basketball clubs in European competitions
