= 2002–03 FIBA Europe Regional Challenge Cup =

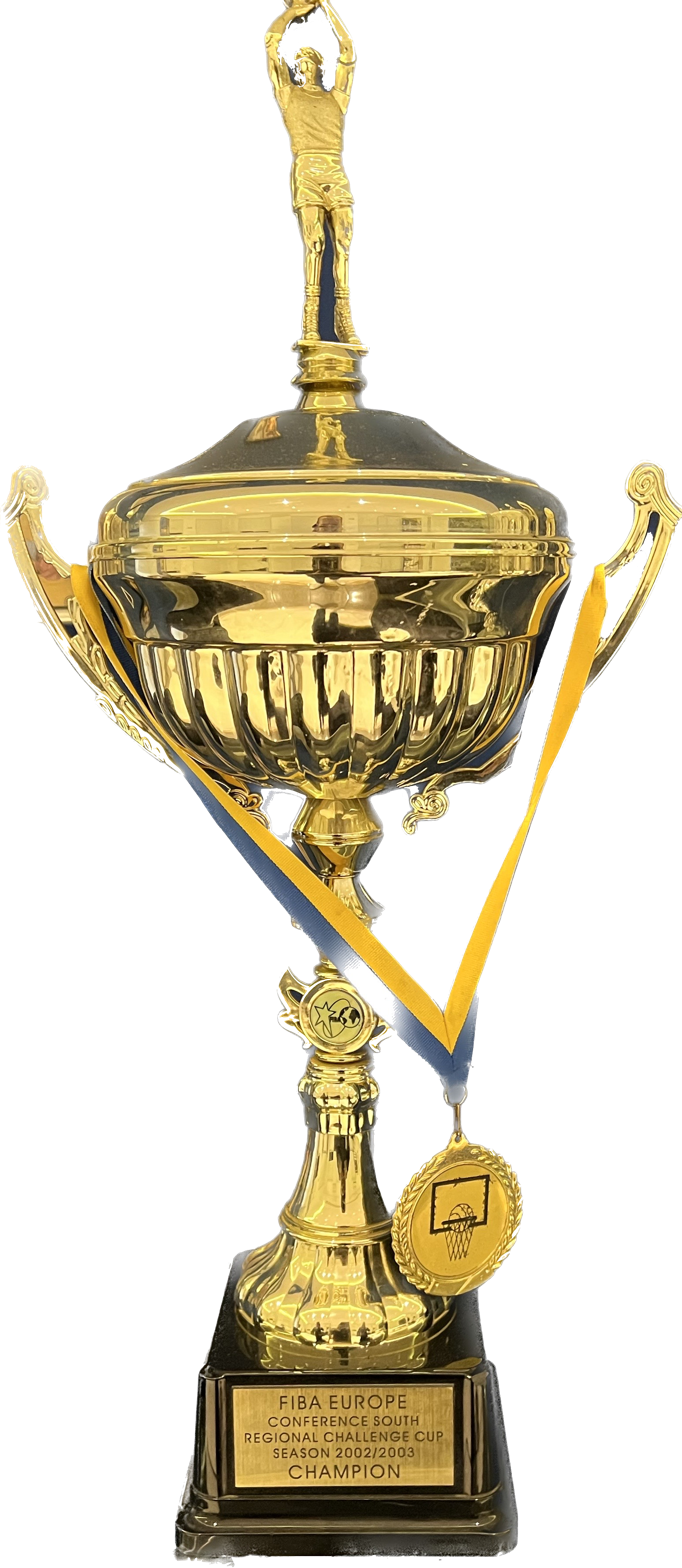
- Season: 2002–03
- Teams: 28

Finals
- Champions: (Ukraine) Azovmash (North) (Cyprus) AEL Limassol (South)

The 2002–03 FIBA Europe Regional Challenge Cup was a one-season international European competition for men's professional basketball clubs, organised by FIBA. Although it was marketed at the time by FIBA as the 2nd-tier level European club basketball tournament, most would consider it Europe's 4th-tier level competition, after the Euroleague, ULEB Cup and the FIBA Europe Champions Cup. The aim of this tournament was to provide competitive international play for clubs that would otherwise be unable to participate in international basketball. The tournament which featured 4 domestic champions was divided in two conferences: "North" (which consisted of 17 teams) and "South" (which consisted of 11 teams). The season started on 30 October 2002, and ended on 13 February 2003. There were two champions - Azovmash from Ukraine and AEL Limassol from Cyprus. Prior to the commencement of the 2003–04 basketball season, an agreement between FIBA Europe and ULEB basketball was reached regarding the management of Europe's transnational leagues. As a result, the Regional Challenge Cup merged with the Champions Cup to form the FIBA Europe Cup, which was thereafter renamed FIBA EuroCup Challenge.

== Teams allocation ==
- 1st, 2nd, etc.: Club's domestic league position after playoffs.

Conference North
Regular season
(Norway) Asker Aliens (1st)	(Germany) Bayer Giants Leverkusen (4th)	(Azerbaijan) NTD Servis-Devon
(Norway) Ulriken Eagles (2nd)	(Germany) DJK Würzburg (9th)	(Czech Republic) ECM Nymburk (3rd)
(Norway) Kongsberg Penguins (4th)	(Hungary) Kaposvari Klima-Vill (3rd)	(Estonia) TTÜ-A. Le Coq (1st)
(Norway) Tromsø Storm (5th)	(Hungary) Albacomp UPC (5th)	(Georgia (country)) Dinamo Tbilisi (2nd)
(Finland) Honka Playboys (1st)	(Ukraine) Azovmash (3rd)	(Slovakia) ESO Lučenec (3rd)
(Finland) Lappeenrannan NMKY (6th)	(Ukraine) Khimik (1st, HL)	

Conference South
Regular season
(Cyprus) EKA AEL Limassol (3rd)	(Bosnia and Herzegovina) Igokea (5th)	(North Macedonia) Nikol Fert (3rd)
(Cyprus) Apollon Limassol (4th)	(Bosnia and Herzegovina) Hercegovac (6th)	(North Macedonia) Žito Vardar (5th)
(Cyprus) ENAD Nicosia (6th)	(Bosnia and Herzegovina) Brotnjo (7th)	(Romania) West Petrom Arad (1st)
(Croatia) Zrinjevac (7th)	(Israel) Hapoel Galil Elyon (7th)	

== Conference North ==
=== Regular season ===
==== Group A ====
Pos	Team	Pld	W	L	PF	PA	PD	Pts	Qualification
1	(Ukraine) Khimik	4	4	0	428	294	+134	8	Advance to conference play-offs
2	(Georgia (country)) Dinamo Tbilisi	4	2	2	397	346	+51	6	Advance to conference play-offs
3	(Azerbaijan) NTD Servis-Devon	4	0	4	295	480	−185	4	

Source: FIBA Europe

==== Group B ====
Pos	Team	Pld	W	L	PF	PA	PD	Pts	Qualification
1	(Hungary) Kaposvari Klima-Vill	6	5	1	584	471	+113	11	Advance to conference play-offs
2	(Germany) Bayer Giants Leverkusen	6	4	2	537	518	+19	10	Advance to conference play-offs
3	(Czech Republic) ECM Nymburk	6	3	3	550	523	+27	9	
4	(Norway) Asker Aliens	6	0	6	444	600	−156	6	

Source: FIBA Europe

==== Group C ====
Pos	Team	Pld	W	L	PF	PA	PD	Pts	Qualification
1	(Hungary) Albacomp UPC	6	5	1	576	450	+126	11	Advance to conference play-offs
2	(Slovakia) ESO Lučenec	6	3	3	473	481	−8	9	Advance to conference play-offs
3	(Germany) DJK Würzburg	6	3	3	451	440	+11	9	
4	(Norway) Ulriken Eagles	6	1	5	410	509	−99	7	

Source: FIBA Europe

==== Group D ====
Pos	Team	Pld	W	L	PF	PA	PD	Pts	Qualification
1	(Ukraine) Azovmash	4	4	0	413	268	+145	8	Advance to conference play-offs
2	(Finland) Lappeenrannan NMKY	4	2	2	323	314	+9	6	
3	(Norway) Tromsø Storm	4	0	4	269	423	−154	4	

Source: FIBA Europe

==== Group E ====
Pos	Team	Pld	W	L	PF	PA	PD	Pts	Qualification
1	(Finland) Honka Playboys	4	3	1	310	275	+35	7	Advance to conference play-offs
2	(Estonia) TTÜ-A. Le Coq	4	3	1	336	302	+34	7	
3	(Norway) Kongsberg Penguins	4	0	4	266	335	−69	4	

Source: FIBA Europe

==== Play-offs ====
The winner of the play-offs qualified for the FIBA Europe Regional Challenge Cup Final Four.

Quarterfinals
(Ukraine) Khimik	78	92
(Finland) Honka Playboys	83	62
(Georgia (country)) Dinamo Tbilisi	91	95
(Ukraine) Azovmash	106	111
(Germany) Bayer Giants Leverkusen	87	94
(Hungary) Albacomp UPC	92	81
(Slovakia) ESO Lučenec	69	59
(Hungary) Kaposvari Klima-Vill	70	89

Semifinals
11 February – Mariupol
(Ukraine) Khimik	62
(Ukraine) Azovmash	95
11 February – Mariupol
(Germany) Bayer Giants Leverkusen	91
(Hungary) Kaposvari Klima-Vill	74

Final
12 February – Mariupol
(Ukraine) Azovmash	88
(Germany) Bayer Giants Leverkusen	61
Third place
12 February – Mariupol
(Ukraine) Khimik	59
(Hungary) Kaposvari Klima-Vill	86

2002–03 FIBA North Regional Challenge Cup

Azovmash
1st title

== Conference South ==
=== Regular season ===
==== Group A ====
Pos	Team	Pld	W	L	PF	PA	PD	Pts	Qualification
1	(Israel) Hapoel Galil Elyon	4	4	0	350	280	+70	8	Advance to conference play-offs
2	(Bosnia and Herzegovina) Hercegovac	4	1	3	297	313	−16	5	Advance to conference play-offs
3	(Cyprus) ENAD Nicosia	4	1	3	239	293	−54	5	

Source: Linguasport

==== Group B ====
Pos	Team	Pld	W	L	PF	PA	PD	Pts	Qualification
1	(Bosnia and Herzegovina) Igokea	6	5	1	580	430	+150	11	Advance to conference play-offs
2	(Romania) West Petrom Arad	6	3	3	406	418	−12	9	Advance to conference play-offs
3	(Cyprus) Apollon Limassol	6	3	3	405	427	−22	9	Advance to conference play-offs
4	(North Macedonia) Žito Vardar	6	1	5	431	475	−44	7	

Source: Linguasport

==== Group C ====
Pos	Team	Pld	W	L	PF	PA	PD	Pts	Qualification
1	(Cyprus) EKA AEL Limassol	6	6	0	499	441	+58	12	Advance to conference play-offs
2	(Croatia) Zrinjevac	6	3	3	457	470	−13	9	Advance to conference play-offs
3	(Bosnia and Herzegovina) Brotnjo	6	2	4	446	436	+10	8	Advance to conference play-offs
4	(North Macedonia) Nikol Fert	6	1	5	441	496	−55	7	

Source: Linguasport

==== Play-offs ====
The winner of the play-offs qualified for the FIBA Europe Regional Challenge Cup Final Four.

Quarterfinals
(Cyprus) Apollon Limassol	86	67
(Israel) Hapoel Galil Elyon	86	65
(Cyprus) EKA AEL Limassol	97	95
(Bosnia and Herzegovina) Brotnjo	74	78
(Croatia) Zrinjevac	83	99
(Bosnia and Herzegovina) Igokea	89	120
(Bosnia and Herzegovina) Hercegovac	100	52
(Romania) West Petrom Arad	75	81

Semifinals
12 February – Limassol
(Cyprus) Apollon Limassol	52
(Cyprus) EKA AEL Limassol	73
12 February – Limassol
(Bosnia and Herzegovina) Igokea	79
(Romania) West Petrom Arad	64

Final
13 February – Limassol
(Cyprus) EKA AEL Limassol	92
(Bosnia and Herzegovina) Igokea	82
Third place
13 February – Limassol
(Cyprus) Apollon Limassol	79
(Romania) West Petrom Arad	65

2002–03 FIBA South Regional Challenge Cup

AEL Limassol
1st title

== Finals ==
Year	Final			Third and fourth place	
Year	Champion	Score	Second place	3rd	4th
2002–03 Details	North Conf. / South Conf.; (Ukraine) Mariupol / (Cyprus) EKA AEL	North Conf. / South Conf.; 88 –61 / 92–82	North Conf. / South Conf.; (Germany) Bayer Leverkusen / (Bosnia and Herzegovina) Igokea	North Conference / South Conf.; (Hungary) Kaposvári / (Cyprus) Pizza Express Apollon	North Conf. / South Conf.; (Ukraine) Khimik / (Romania) West Petrom Arad

== Finals MVP ==
Season	Player	Pos.	Club
2002–03	(United States) Duane Woodward	PG/SG	(Cyprus) EKA AEL

== Winning rosters ==
FIBA Europe Regional Challenge Cup:

North Conference:

- 2002–03 (Ukraine) Azovmash Mariupol

Volodymyr Gurtovyy, Andriy Kapinos, Andriy Botichev, Oleksandr Skutyelnik, Igor Kharchenko, Sergiy Moskalenko, Petro Podtykan, Yevhenii Annienkov, Dmytro Briantsev (Head Coach: Andrij Podkovyrov)

South Conference:

- 2002–03 (Cyprus) EKA AEL Limassol

Dimitris Prokopiou, Marcos Asonitis, Georgios Kouzapas, Michalis Kounounis, Davor Kurilic, Konstantinos Perentos, Ranko Velimirovic, David Michael Van Dyke, Christos Spyrou, Duane Woodward (Head Coach: Dragan Raca).

== See also ==
- 2002-03 FIBA Europe Champions Cup
- FIBA Europe Conference South
- FIBA Europe Conference North
