= FIBA Europe Conference North =

FIBA Europe Conference North was a basketball tournament of FIBA Europe Conference North held from 2002 to 2005. It was part of FIBA Europe Cup tournament. In tournament involving teams from Poland, Russia, Baltic States, Scandinavia, Belarus, Czech Republic and Ukraine. The tournament takes place in three stages. The first is the group stage, the second is playoff, and the third stage is the Final Four.

== Final Conference north 2002/2003 (A) ==
Semi-finals
14 Jan. 2003
(Russia) BC UNICS	114
(Poland) Asseco Prokom Gdynia	80
14 Jan. 2003
(Lithuania) BC Lietuvos Rytas	94
(Poland) WTK Anwil Włocławek	63

Final
15 Jan. 2003
(Russia) BC UNICS	93
(Lithuania) BC Lietuvos Rytas	90

== Final Conference north 2002/2003 (B) ==
Semi-finals
11 Feb. 2003
(Ukraine) BC Azovmash	95
(Ukraine) BC Khimik	62
11 Feb. 2003
(Germany) Bayer Giants Leverkusen	91
(Hungary) Kaposvári KK	74

Final
12 Feb. 2003
(Ukraine) BC Azovmash	88
(Germany) Bayer Giants Leverkusen	61

== Final Conference north 2003/2004 ==
Semi-finals
28 Feb. 2004
(Russia) BC Dynamo MO	91
(Latvia) BK Valmiera	88
28 Feb. 2004
(Russia) BC Avtodor Saratov	107
(Russia) BC Arsenal Tula	92

Final
29 Feb. 2004
(Russia) BC Dynamo MO	96
(Russia) BC Avtodor Saratov	88

== Final Conference north 2004/2005 ==
Semi-finals
16 Feb. 2005
(Russia) BC Dynamo MO	100
(Russia) BK EVRAZ	79
16 Feb. 2005
(Russia) PBC Lokomotiv Kuban	94
(Lithuania) BC Šiauliai	57

Final
17 Feb. 2005
(Russia) BC Dynamo MO	91
(Russia) PBC Lokomotiv Kuban	86

== Titles by club ==
Rank	Club	Titles	Runner-up	Champion years
2	(Russia) Dynamo Moscow Region	2	0	2003–04, 2004–05
1	(Russia) UNICS	1	0	2002–03
1	(Ukraine) BC Azovmash	1	0	2002–03

== See also ==
- Eurocup Basketball
- EuroChallenge
- FIBA EuroCup Challenge
- FIBA Europe Conference South
