= FIBA Europe Conference South =

FIBA Europe South Conference was a FIBA Europe organized basketball tournament held from 2002 to 2005. It was a regional division part of FIBA Europe Cup tournament, the 4th-tier and 5th-tier continental basketball levels. In tournament includes teams from Bulgaria, Cyprus, Turkey, Romania, Serbia, Macedonia, Greece, Croatia, Bosnia and Herzegovina, Georgia and Slovenia. The tournament was played in three stages. The first was the group stage, followed by the playoff, and the Final Four.

== 2002–03 ==
=== Final Conference south 2002/2003 (A) ===
Semi-finals
16 Jan. 2003
(Bulgaria) Lukoil Academic	99
(Turkey) Türk Telekom	83
16 Jan. 2003
(Greece) Aris	86
(Greece) Peristeri	84

Final
17 Jan. 2003
(Bulgaria) Lukoil Academic	81
(Greece) Aris	80

=== Final Conference south 2002/2003 (B) ===
Semi-finals
12 Feb. 2003
(Cyprus) Apollon Limassol B.C.	52
(Cyprus) EKA AEL	73
12 Feb. 2003
(Bosnia and Herzegovina) Igokea	79
(Romania) ACS Progresul Pecica	64

Final
13 Feb. 2003
(Cyprus) EKA AEL	92
(Bosnia and Herzegovina) Igokea	82

== Final Conference south 2003/2004 ==
Semi-finals
28 Feb. 2004
(North Macedonia) Rabotnički	96
(Cyprus) Keravnos	75
28 Feb. 2004
(Turkey) Tuborg Pilsener	84
(Turkey) Fenerbahçe	67

Final
29 Feb. 2004
(Turkey) Tuborg Pilsener	80
(North Macedonia) Rabotnički	78

== Final Conference south 2004/2005 ==
Semi-finals
16 Feb. 2005
(Turkey) Banvit	90
(Cyprus) Keravnos	74
16 Feb. 2005
(Romania) CSU Asesoft Ploiești	71
(Cyprus) Apollon Limassol BC	65

Final
17 Feb. 2005
(Turkey) Banvit	71
(Romania) CSU Asesoft Ploiești	68

== Titles by club ==
Rank	Club	Titles	Runner-up	Champion years
1	(Bulgaria) Lucoil Academic	1	0	2002–03 (A)
1	(Cyprus) EKA AEL	1	0	2002–03 (B)
1	(Turkey) Tuborg Pilsener	1	0	2003–04
1	(Turkey) Banvit	1	0	2004–05

== See also ==
- Eurocup Basketball
- EuroChallenge
- FIBA EuroCup Challenge
- FIBA Europe Conference North
- Balkan International Basketball League
