= Valeri Tikhonenko =

Soviet-Russian basketball player

Personal information
- Born: 19 August 1964 (age 62) Angren, Uzbek SSR, Soviet Union
- Listed height: 2.07 m (6 ft 9 in)
- Listed weight: 106 kg (234 lb)

Career information
- NBA draft: 1986: 7th round, 157th overall pick
- Drafted by: Atlanta Hawks
- Playing career: 1984–2000
- Position: Power forward / small forward
- Number: 9
- Coaching career: 2000–2010

Career history

Playing
- 1984–1985: SKA Alma-Ata
- 1985–1987: CSKA Moscow
- 1987–1990: SKA Alma-Ata
- 1990–1991: Fórum Valladolid
- 1991–1992: Unicaja Ronda
- 1992–1993: Argal Huesca
- 1993–1994: Spartak Moscow
- 1994–1997: CSK VVS-Samara
- 1997: Arsenal Tula
- 1997–2000: CSKA Moscow

Coaching
- 2000–2002: CSKA Moscow
- 2004–2005: Dynamo Moscow
- 2005–2009: CSK VVS-Samara
- 2009–2010: Russia Women

Career highlights
- As player: North European League champion (2000); 3× Russian Super League championship (1998–2000); 2× Russian Super League MVP (1994, 1995); 2× Russian Super League All-Star Game (1996, 1999); Russian Super League All-Star Game MVP (1999); As head coach: FIBA EuroCup Challenge champion (2007)
- Stats at Basketball Reference
Medals
Men's basketball
Representing Soviet Union
Olympic Games
| Gold medal – first place | 1988 Seoul |
Friendship Games
| Gold medal – first place | 1984 Soviet Union |
FIBA World Cup
| Silver medal – second place | 1986 Spain |
| Silver medal – second place | 1990 Argentina |
FIBA EuroBasket
| Gold medal – first place | 1985 Germany |
| Silver medal – second place | 1987 Greece |
| Bronze medal – third place | 1989 Yugoslavia |
FIBA Under-19 World Cup
| Silver medal – second place | 1983 Spain | Under-19 |
European Championship for Juniors
| Gold medal – first place | 1982 Bulgaria | Under-18 |
European Championship for Cadets
| Gold medal – first place | 1981 Greece | Under-16 |
Representing Russia
FIBA World Cup
| Silver medal – second place | 1998 Greece |
Head coach for Russia Women
EuroBasket Women
| Silver medal – second place | 2009 Latvia |

Valeri Tikhonenko (Russian: Валерий Алексеевич Тихоненко; born 19 August 1964) is a retired Soviet and Russian professional basketball player and coach. During his playing career, he played at the small forward and power forward positions, with power forward being his main position. He represented both the Soviet Union and Russia in national team competitions. With the Soviet Union, he won a gold medal at the 1988 Summer Olympics.

== Professional career ==
Tikhonenko was selected by the Atlanta Hawks, in the 7th round of the 1986 NBA draft, with the 157th overall draft pick. During his pro club career, Tikhonenko won three Russian Championships with CSKA Moscow (1998, 1999, 2000).

== National team career ==
With the senior Soviet Union national team, Tikhonenko won a gold medal at the 1984 Friendship Games (the alternate tournament to the 1984 Summer Olympics), a gold medal at the 1985 EuroBasket, a silver medal at the 1986 FIBA World Cup, a silver medal at the 1987 EuroBasket, a gold medal at the 1988 Summer Olympics, a bronze medal at the 1989 EuroBasket, and a silver medal at the 1990 FIBA World Cup. He also played at the 1992 Summer Olympics, as a member of the Unified Team).

As a member of Russia's national team, he played at the 1998 FIBA World Cup, where he won a silver medal, and at the 1999 EuroBasket.

== Executive career ==
Tikhonenko became the general manager of the Kazakh League club Astana, in 2011.

== Personal life ==
Tikhonenko was a lieutenant colonel in the Russian Army.

== Orders won ==
- USSR Medal "For Distinguished Labour"
- USSR Order of Friendship of Peoples
- USSR Order of the Badge of Honor
- Honored Master of Sports of the USSR (1988)
- Russian Order of Friendship
