= Sharon Drucker =

Israeli professional basketball coach

Sharon Drucker שרון דרוקר
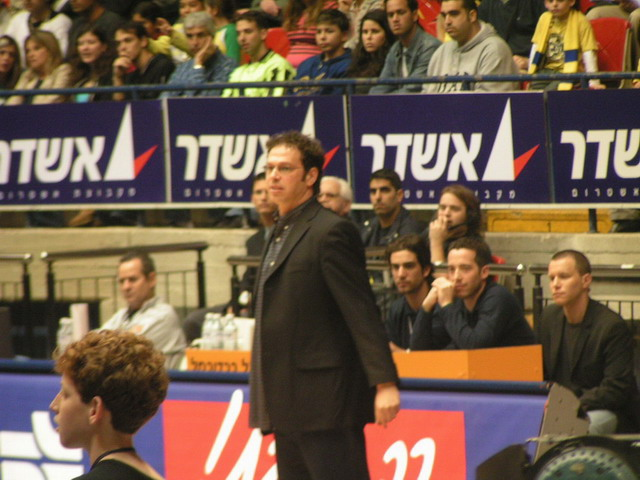

Hapoel Haifa
- Position: Head coach
- League: Liga Leumit

Personal information
- Born: July 26, 1967 (age 59) Petah Tikva, Israel
- Coaching career: 1996–present

Career history

Coaching
- 1996–1999: Maccabi Ra'anana (assistant)
- 1999–2002: Maccabi Ra'anana
- 2002–2003: Hapoel Galil Elyon
- 2003–2005: Hapoel Jerusalem
- 2005–2006: Ural Great Perm
- 2006: Lietuvos rytas
- 2006–2008: Oostende
- 2008–2010: Maccabi Tel Aviv (assistant)
- 2010–2011: Aris
- 2011: Sutor Montegranaro
- 2012–2013: Hapoel Jerusalem
- 2013–2014: Hapoel Gilboa Galil
- 2014–2016: Maccabi Rishon LeZion
- 2017: Lukoil Academic
- 2017–2019: Hapoel Eilat
- 2019: Hapoel Holon
- 2020–2022: Bnei Herzliya
- 2021–2025: Israel (women)
- 2022–2023: Hapoel Haifa
- 2023–2025: Israel (men) (assistant)
- 2026: Maccabi Rishon LeZion
- 2026–present: Hapoel Haifa

Career highlights
- As head coach: Israeli Coach of the Year (2000); ULEB Cup (2004); FIBA EuroCup Challenge (2006); Belgian League champion (2007); Belgian Cup (2008); As assistant coach: Israeli League champion (2009)

Sharon Drucker (Hebrew: שרון דרוקר; born July 26, 1967) is an Israeli professional basketball coach, currently serving as the head coach for Hapoel Haifa of the Liga Leumit.

== Personal life ==
His brother, Raviv Drucker is a journalist.

He has two children from his first wife - Hadas and an additional son from his former partner - Tsipi.

== Titles ==
- Israeli Coach of the Year 2000
- ULEB Cup 2004 - Hapoel Jerusalem
- EuroCup Challenge 2006 - Ural Great
- Belgian League 2007 - Oostende
- Belgian Cup 2008 - Oostende
- Israeli League 2009 - Maccabi Tel Aviv (assistant)
