= 2002–03 FIBA Europe Champions Cup =

- Season: 2002–03

Finals
- Champions: (Greece) Aris (1st title)
- Runners-up: (Poland) Prokom Trefl Sopot
- Third place: (Latvia) Ventspils
- Fourth place: (Serbia and Montenegro) Hemofarm
- Final Four MVP: (United States) Will Solomon

Statistical leaders
Points	(Bulgaria) Todor Stoykov	24.0
Rebounds	(Bulgaria) Priest Lauderdale	12.0
Assists	(Latvia) Kristaps Valters	7.3

The 2002–03 FIBA Europe Champions Cup was the first edition of Europe's transnational competition for men's professional basketball clubs, the FIBA Europe Champions Cup, following the abolushment of the FIBA Korać Cup and FIBA Saporta Cup competitions and the launch of the ULEB Cup.

It was FIBA's top tier competition. In this first edition, it was actually the 3rd tier level on the European club basketball pyramid, featuring 15 domestic league champions. Except Lithuania, the champions were only from the countries, which wasn't represented in the Euroleague or the ULEB Cup.

The season consisted of 64 teams. The Greek club Aris Thessaloniki won the title, after beating the Polish club Prokom Trefl Sopot in the Final, which was held at Alexandreio Melathron, in Thessaloniki, Greece.

The competition, which was initially advertised as FIBA's attempt to revive the FIBA European Champions Cup (now known as the EuroLeague). The competition attracted 15 national domestic league champions, 5 runners-up, and teams from 30 European national leagues, which represented it as a truly pan-European event. Several teams like Split, Aris, PAOK, Lietuvos Rytas, Kalev, Fribourg, Planja, Academic, Levski, APOEL, Ventspils, Rabotnički, and Porto had played for years in FIBA's former Champions Cup (1958–2001).

Apart from Lietuvos Rytas and UNICS, no other participant of the FIBA Europe Champions Cup finished higher in their national championship in the previous season than any of the participants of the 2002-03 season of the Euroleague or the ULEB Cup.

The brand new competition was also joined by second division runners-up from Italy, Russia and Spain, and the newly promoted champion of the Israeli Second Division. The league was unable to make a good commercial impact, and was then dropped to being the European 4th-tier level in the following 2003–04 season, as FIBA launched the FIBA Europe League to replace it.

== Teams ==
Country	Teams	Clubs				
Greece	5	Panionios Freddoccino (5th)	Maroussi Telestet (6th)	Peristeri (7th)	PAOK (8th)	Aris (10th)
Portugal	5	Portugal Telecom (1st)	Ovarense Aerosoles (2nd)	Oliveirense (3rd)	Porto Ferpinta (4th)	CAB Madeira (13th)
Poland	4	Prokom Trefl Sopot (2nd)	Gipsar Stal Ostrów (3d)	Anwil Włocławek (4th)	Polonia Warszawa (5th)	
Russia	4	UNICS (2nd)	Avtodor Saratov (4th)	Khimki (8th)	EvrAz (2nd, SL B)	
Belgium	3	Quatro Bree (3rd)	Dexia Mons-Hainaut (4th)	Euphony Liège (5th)		
Bulgaria	3	Yambolgaz-92 (1st)	Lukoil Academic (2nd)	Levski Sofia (3d)		
France	3	JDA Dijon (6th)	SIG Strasbourg (9th)	SLUC Nancy (8th)		
Israel	3	Hapoel Migdal Jerusalem (3d)	Bnei HaSharon	Hapoel Tel Aviv (1st, A2)		
Lithuania	3	Lietuvos rytas (1st)	Alita (3d)	Šiauliai (4th)		
Bosnia and Herzegovina	2	Feal Široki (1st)	Sloboda Dita Tuzla (2nd)			
Croatia	2	Split CO (9th)	Zagreb (3rd)			
Cyprus	2	APOEL (1st)	Keravnos Keo (2nd)			
Czech Republic	2	Opava (1st)	Mlékárna Kunín (2nd)			
Estonia	2	Kalev Tallinn (1st)	Tartu ÜSK Rock (2nd)			
Latvia	2	Ventspils (1st)	Skonto (2nd)			
Serbia and Montenegro	2	Hemofarm (4th)	NIS Vojvodina (6th)			
Spain	2	Ourense (3d, A2)	Tenerife (4th, A2)			
Turkey	2	Türk Telekom (5th)	Pinar Karşıyaka (8th)			
Ukraine	2	Odesa (1st)	Kyiv (2nd)			
Austria	1	Montan Bears Kapfenberg (1st)				
Belarus	1	Grodno-93 (1st)				
Denmark	1	BF Copenhagen (1st)				
England	1	Birmingham Bullets (9th)				
(North Macedonia) Macedonia	1	Feršped Rabotnički (1st)				
Hungary	1	Atomerőmű (1st)				
Italy	1	Bipop Carire Reggio Emilia (2nd, A2)				
Netherlands	1	EiffelTowers Nijmegen (2nd)				
Slovenia	1	Geoplin Slovan (4th)				
Sweden	1	Plannja Basket (1st)				
Switzerland	1	Benetton Fribourg (2nd)				

== Draw and promotion ==
The participating teams were announced on 21 July 2002. The draw took place on the 30th July, 2002, in Munich. FIBA appointed legendary former players who had played in the FIBA Champions Cup (1958-2001) to promote the new competition:

- Sarunas Marciulionis (Managing Director of the Northern Conference)
- Predrag Danilovic (member of the Board of FIBA Europe)
- Kosta Illiev (Managing Director of the Southern Conference)
- José Antonio Montero (Managing Director of the Western Conference
- Alexander Volkov (member of the Board of FIBA Europe)

== Competition system ==
- 64 teams from countries affiliated to FIBA Europe enter a Regional Qualifying Round (RQR), distributed in three major conferences (North, South and West) according to their geographical location. Within each conference, the teams are further divided into groups and play a Round-robin. The final standing is based on individual wins and defeats. In case of a tie between two or more teams after this group stage, the following criteria are used to decide the final classification: 1) number of wins in one-to-one games between the teams; 2) basket average between the teams; 3) general basket average within the group.
- The RQR group winners and runners-up, together with the best third-placed teams, advance to Pan-European Phase (PEP). Before the PEP phase, the group champions of the RQR Northern and Southern conferences participate in a final round to contest for the symbolic title of Conference Champion- in the case of the Northern conference, the final four doubles as NEBL championship (North European Basketball League).
- The 24 teams qualified for the PEP are divided into six groups of four teams each playing a Round-robin. The group winners, together with the two best runners-up, qualify for a quarterfinal play-off (x-pairings, home and away games).
- The four winners of the quarterfinal play-off qualify for the final stage (Final Four), played at a predetermined venue. The winner gets a wild card to participate in 2003–04 FIBA Europe League.

== Conference North ==
The season ran from October 1, 2002 to November 5, 2002. The winner was also considered the champion of the 2002-03 North European Basketball League.

Key to colors
Top two places in each group advance to PEP
Eliminated

=== Group A ===
	Team	Pld	W	L	PF	PA	Diff	Tie-break
1.	(Russia) UNICS	10	9	1	896	724	+172	
2.	(Latvia) Ventspils	10	7	3	914	797	+117	
3.	(Lithuania) Šiauliai	10	4	6	821	886	−65	3–1 (+28)
4.	(Poland) Gipsar Stal Ostrów	10	4	6	805	837	−32	2–2 (+6)
5.	(Czech Republic) Opava	10	4	6	829	874	−45	1–3 (+24)
6.	(Sweden) Plannja Basket	10	2	8	767	914	−147	

=== Group B ===
	Team	Pld	W	L	PF	PA	Diff	Tie-break
1.	(Poland) Anwil Włocławek	8	8	0	666	537	+129	
2.	(Ukraine) Odesa	8	4	4	655	686	−31	
3.	(Denmark) Copenhagen	8	3	5	586	579	+7	1–1 (+8)
4.	(Russia) EvrAz	8	3	5	567	589	−22	1–1 (−8)
5.	(Estonia) Tartu ÜSK Rock	8	2	6	589	672	−45	

=== Group C ===
	Team	Pld	W	L	PF	PA	Diff	Tie-break
1.	(Poland) Prokom Trefl Sopot	10	10	0	951	718	+233	
2.	(Latvia) Skonto	10	7	3	975	882	+93	
3.	(Russia) Avtodor Saratov	10	6	4	881	903	−22	
4.	(Czech Republic) Mlékárna Kunín	10	3	7	895	985	−90	
5.	(Belarus) Grodno-93	10	2	8	764	876	−112	1–1 (+5)
6.	(Lithuania) Alita	10	2	8	819	921	−102	1–1 (−5)

=== Group D ===
	Team	Pld	W	L	PF	PA	Diff	Tie-break
1.	(Lithuania) Lietuvos rytas	10	10	0	938	670	+268	
2.	(Russia) Khimki	10	6	4	875	830	+45	
3.	(Poland) Polonia Warszawa	10	5	5	830	847	−17	
4.	(Ukraine) Kyiv	10	4	6	859	901	−42	
5.	(Hungary) Atomerőmű	10	3	7	770	883	−113	
6.	(Estonia) Kalev	10	2	8	706	847	−141	

Before the PEP phase, the group champions of the RQR Northern conference participate in a final round to contest for the symbolic title of Conference Champion

=== Semifinals ===
January 14, Vilnius Palace of Sports, Vilnius

Team 1	Score	Team 2
Prokom Trefl Sopot (Poland)	80–114	(Russia) UNICS
Lietuvos rytas (Lithuania)	94–63	(Poland) Anwil Włocławek

=== 3rd place game ===
January 15, Vilnius Palace of Sports, Vilnius

Team 1	Score	Team 2
Anwil Włocławek (Poland)	78–65	(Poland) Prokom Trefl Sopot

=== Final ===
January 15, Vilnius Palace of Sports, Vilnius

Team 1	Score	Team 2
Lietuvos rytas (Lithuania)	90–93	(Russia) UNICS

== Conference South ==
The season ran from October 1, 2002 to November 5, 2002.

Key to colors
Top two places (and the best 3rd) in each group advance to PEP
Eliminated

=== Group A ===
	Team	Pld	W	L	PF	PA	Diff	Tie-break
1.	(Greece) Peristeri	10	9	1	844	718	+126	
2.	(Israel) Hapoel Migdal Jerusalem	10	7	3	878	826	+52	
3.	(Bulgaria) Yambolgaz-92	10	5	5	771	790	−19	
4.	(Serbia and Montenegro) NIS Vojvodina	10	4	6	850	862	−12	1–1 (+16)
5.	(Turkey) Pinar Karşıyaka	10	4	6	792	815	−23	1–1 (−16)
6.	(North Macedonia) Feršped Rabotnički	10	1	9	747	871	−147	

=== Group B ===
	Team	Pld	W	L	PF	PA	Diff	Tie-break
1.	(Turkey) Türk Telekom	10	8	2	801	749	+52	
2.	(Serbia and Montenegro) Hemofarm	10	7	3	825	726	+99	1–1 (+14)
3.	(Israel) Hapoel Tel Aviv	10	7	3	806	742	+64	1–1 (−14)
4.	(Greece) Panionios Freddoccino	10	6	4	820	799	+21	
5.	(Bulgaria) Levski Sofia	10	1	9	793	872	−79	1–1 (+1)
6.	(Bosnia and Herzegovina) Sloboda Dita	10	1	9	684	841	−157	1–1 (−1)

=== Group C ===
	Team	Pld	W	L	PF	PA	Diff	Tie-break
1.	(Greece) Aris	8	6	2	701	633	+68	
2.	(Israel) Bnei HaSharon	8	5	3	668	632	+36	1–1 (+12)
3.	(Greece) Maroussi Telestet	8	5	3	731	694	+37	1–1 (−12)
4.	(Croatia) Split CO	8	2	6	679	752	−73	1–1 (+16)
5.	(Cyprus) Keravnos Keo	8	2	6	567	635	−68	1–1 (−16)

=== Group D ===
	Team	Pld	W	L	PF	PA	Diff	Tie-break
1.	(Bulgaria) Lukoil Academic	10	8	2	878	720	+158	
2.	(Greece) PAOK	10	7	3	858	778	+80	
3.	(Slovenia) Geoplin Slovan	10	6	4	753	705	+48	
4.	(Croatia) Zagreb	10	4	6	783	790	−7	1–1 (+9)
5.	(Bosnia and Herzegovina) Feal Široki	10	4	6	772	848	−76	1–1 (−9)
6.	(Cyprus) APOEL	10	1	9	644	847	−203	

Before the PEP phase, the group champions of the RQR Southern conference participate in a final round to contest for the symbolic title of Conference Champion

=== Semifinals ===
January 16, Universiada Hall, Sofia

Team 1	Score	Team 2
Peristeri (Greece)	84–86	(Greece) Aris
Lukoil Academic (Bulgaria)	99–83	(Turkey) Türk Telekom

=== 3rd place game ===
January 17, Universiada Hall, Sofia

Team 1	Score	Team 2
Türk Telekom (Turkey)	86–70	(Greece) Peristeri

=== Final ===
January 17, Universiada Hall, Sofia

Team 1	Score	Team 2
Lukoil Academic (Bulgaria)	81–80	(Greece) Aris

== Conference West ==
The season ran from October 1, 2002 to November 5, 2002.

Key to colors
Top two places (and the best 3rd) in each group advance to PEP
Eliminated

=== Group A ===
	Team	Pld	W	L	PF	PA	Diff	Tie-break
1.	(Spain) Tenerife	10	9	1	804	732	+72	
2.	(France) JDA Dijon	10	6	4	829	776	+53	2–0 (+14)
3.	(England) Birmingham Bullets	10	6	4	746	764	−18	0–2 (−14)
4.	(Belgium) Dexia Mons-Hainaut	10	5	5	806	791	+15	
5.	(Switzerland) Benetton Fribourg	10	2	8	690	776	−86	2–0 (+10)
6.	(Portugal) Oliveirense	10	2	8	797	833	−36	0–2 (−10)

=== Group B ===
	Team	Pld	W	L	PF	PA	Diff	Tie-break
1.	(France) SIG Strasbourg	10	7	3	865	818	+47	
2.	(Spain) Ourense	10	6	4	910	861	+49	
3.	(Portugal) Ovarense Aerosoles	10	5	5	878	851	+27	1–1 (+13)
4.	Portugal Telecom	10	5	5	819	827	−8	1–1 (−13)
5.	(Austria) Montan Bears Kapfenberg	10	4	6	871	906	−35	
6.	(Belgium) Euphony Liège	10	3	7	799	879	−80	

=== Group C ===
	Team	Pld	W	L	PF	PA	Diff	Tie-break
1.	(Netherlands) EiffelTowers Nijmegen	10	8	2	856	794	+62	
2.	(Italy) Bipop Carire Reggio Emilia	10	7	3	858	838	+20	
3.	(Portugal) Porto Ferpinta	10	5	5	858	830	−18	2–0 (+14)
4.	(France) SLUC Nancy	10	5	5	814	764	+50	0–2 (−14)
5.	(Belgium) Quatro Bree	10	3	7	770	848	−78	
6.	(Portugal) CAB Madeira	10	2	8	812	894	−82	

== Overall winners ==
- (Russia) UNICS (North)
- (Bulgaria) PBC Academic (South)

== Pan-European phase ==
The phase ran from February 2, 2003 to March 25, 2003.

Key to colors
Advance to Quarterfinals
Eliminated

=== Group A ===
	Team	Pld	W	L	PF	PA	Diff	Tie-break
1.	(Russia) UNICS	6	6	0	544	428	+116	
2.	(Ukraine) Odesa	6	3	3	522	557	−35	
3.	(Israel) Hapoel Jerusalem	6	2	4	511	525	−14	
4.	(Turkey) Türk Telekom	6	1	5	478	545	−67	

=== Group B ===
	Team	Pld	W	L	PF	PA	Diff	Tie-break
1.	(Serbia and Montenegro) Hemofarm	6	5	1	533	457	+76	
2.	(Lithuania) Lietuvos rytas	6	3	3	494	468	+26	
3.	(Latvia) Skonto	6	2	4	530	567	−37	1–1 (+25)
4.	(Greece) PAOK	6	2	4	470	535	−65	1–1 (−25)

=== Group C ===
	Team	Pld	W	L	PF	PA	Diff	Tie-break
1.	(Poland) Prokom Trefl Sopot	6	5	1	499	463	+36	
2.	(Latvia) Ventspils	6	3	3	531	480	+51	
3.	(Netherlands) EiffelTowers Nijmegen	6	2	4	527	544	−17	1–1 (0)
4.	(Spain) Ourense	6	2	4	450	520	−70	1–1 (0)

=== Group D ===
	Team	Pld	W	L	PF	PA	Diff	Tie-break
1.	(France) JDA Dijon	4	3	1	326	305	+21	
2.	(Portugal) Porto Ferpinta	4	2	2	300	317	−17	
3.	(Poland) Anwil Włocławek	4	1	3	295	299	−4	

=== Group E ===
	Team	Pld	W	L	PF	PA	Diff	Tie-break
1.	(Greece) Aris	6	4	2	505	504	+1	1–1 (+8)
2.	(Israel) Hapoel Tel Aviv	6	4	2	439	429	+10	1–1 (−8)
3.	(Russia) Khimki	6	2	4	528	517	+11	1–1 (+14)
4.	(France) SIG Strasbourg	6	2	4	459	481	−22	1–1 (−14)

=== Group F ===
	Team	Pld	W	L	PF	PA	Diff	Tie-break
1.	(Bulgaria) Lukoil Academic	6	5	1	550	483	+67	
2.	(Spain) Unelco Tenerife*	6	3	3	487	467	+20	
3.	(Italy) Bipop Carire Reggio Emilia	6	2	4	391	445	−54	2–0 (+27)
4.	(Israel) Bnei HaSharon	6	2	4	418	451	−33	0–2 (−27)

^{*}In 2003, Tenerife CB signed a sponsorship contract with Unelco and adopted the commercial name "Unelco Tenerife CB".

== Quarterfinals ==
The quarterfinals were two-legged ties determined on aggregate score. The first legs was played on April 8. All return legs were played on April 15.

Team 1	Agg.	Team 2	1st leg	2nd leg
Aris (Greece)	158–150	(Bulgaria) Lukoil Academic	91–73	67–77
Hapoel Tel Aviv (Israel)	127–138	(Serbia and Montenegro) Hemofarm	52–56	75–82
JDA Dijon (France)	157–177	(Poland) Prokom Trefl Sopot	70–74	87–103
Ventspils (Latvia)	164–158	(Russia) UNICS	88–79	76–79

== Final Four ==
=== Semifinals ===
- May 2, 2003 at Alexandreio Melathron in Thessaloniki, Greece.

Team 1	Score	Team 2
Ventspils (Latvia)	57–79	(Poland) Prokom Trefl Sopot
Hemofarm (Serbia and Montenegro)	66–73	(Greece) Aris

=== 3rd place game ===
- May 4, 2003 at Alexandreio Melathron in Thessaloniki, Greece.

Team 1	Score	Team 2
Ventspils (Latvia)	91–90	(Serbia and Montenegro) Hemofarm

=== Final ===
- May 4, 2003 at Alexandreio Melathron in Thessaloniki, Greece.

Team 1	Score	Team 2
Aris (Greece)	84–83	(Poland) Prokom Trefl Sopot

2002–03 FIBA Europe Champions Cup

Aris
1st title

=== Final standings ===
	Team
	(Greece) Aris
Silver medal	(Poland) Prokom Trefl Sopot
Bronze medal	(Latvia) Ventspils
4.	(Serbia and Montenegro) Hemofarm

== See also ==
- 2002–03 Euroleague
- 2002–03 ULEB Cup
- 2002–03 FIBA Europe Regional Challenge Cup

== Sources ==
- 2002–03 at Eurobasket.com
- Linguasport
- Statistics
