= Joe Wylie =

American basketball player (born 1968)

Personal information
- Born: February 10, 1968 (age 58) Washington, D.C., U.S.
- Listed height: 6 ft 9 in (2.06 m)
- Listed weight: 210 lb (95 kg)

Career information
- High school: Woodrow Wilson (Washington, D.C.)
- College: Miami (Florida) (1988–1991)
- NBA draft: 1991: 2nd round, 38th overall pick
- Drafted by: Los Angeles Clippers
- Playing career: 1991–2005
- Position: Power forward

Career history
- 1991: CB Collado Villalba
- 1991–1992: Columbus Horizon
- 1992–1993: Nasaş
- 1993–1994: CB Guadalajara
- 1994: Chorale Roanne Basket
- 1994: Vaqueros de Bayamón
- 1995: Peñarol de Mar del Plata
- 1995: Vaqueros de Bayamón
- 1995–1996: Besiktas
- 1996: Gigantes de Carolina
- 1996–1997: Basket Rimini Crabs
- 1997: Vaqueros de Bayamón
- 1997–1998: A.P.L. Pozzuoli
- 1998: Hapoel Holon
- 1998: Bnei Herzliya
- 1998: Vaqueros de Bayamón
- 1999: Benfica
- 1999: San Miguel Beermen
- 1999: Leones de Ponce
- 1999–2000: Ratiopharm Ulm
- 2000: Leones de Ponce
- 2000–2001: Hapoel Holon
- 2001: Brujos de Guayama
- 2001–2002: CSK VVS Samara
- 2002: Cajasur Córdoba
- 2004–2005: Debreceni Vadkakasok
- 2005: Kaposvári KK
- Stats at Basketball Reference

Joseph Jay Wylie Sr. (born February 10, 1968), is an American retired professional basketball player. Born in Washington, D.C., he is listed at 6'9" and weighed 210 lbs. Wylie played collegiate ball with the University of Miami Hurricanes from 1988 to 1991), where he earned the names, "Wylie's World", and "Jumping Joe Wylie", because of his ability to leap over his opponents.

Wylie entered the 1991 NBA draft and was picked 38th in the second round by the Los Angeles Clippers. On July 4, 1991, almost a week after the draft, the Clippers traded him to the New York Knicks for a 1993 second round pick. The Knicks were enthusiastic of getting such a player of his calibre;

In 1992, Wylie was invited to the Minnesota Timberwolves training camp but he was eventually cut from the roster during the preseason. In 1993 Wylie played in 6 preseason games with the Detroit Pistons and was the last cut before contracts became guaranteed.

He eventually played his professional basketball career mostly overseas in Italy, Spain, France, Venezuela, Puerto Rico, Turkey, Argentina, Israel, Portugal, the Philippines, Germany, Russia, the Dominican Republic and Hungary. He also played in CBA with the Columbus Horizon during the 1991–92 season. He retired in 2009.

Wylie has a son, Joseph Micheal Wylie Jr., who played collegiate football at his alma mater but later transferred to Tennessee State University.
