= Eurocup 2014–15 Regular Season Group K =

Standings and Results for Group K of the Last 32 phase of the 2014–15 Eurocup basketball tournament.

== Standings ==
Pos	Team	Pld	W	L	PF	PA	PD	BAY	BRO	JDA	UOL
1	(Germany) Bayern Munich	6	6	0	534	437	+97		87–63	93–84	90–84
2	(Germany) Brose Bamberg	6	3	3	444	474	−30	52–90		81–86	91–90
3	(France) Dijon	6	2	4	453	498	−45	74–84	56–86		77–81
4	(Slovenia) Union Olimpija	6	1	5	473	495	−22	80–90	65–71	73–76	

Source: Euroleague Basketball;
