= Valery Likhodey =

Russian basketball player

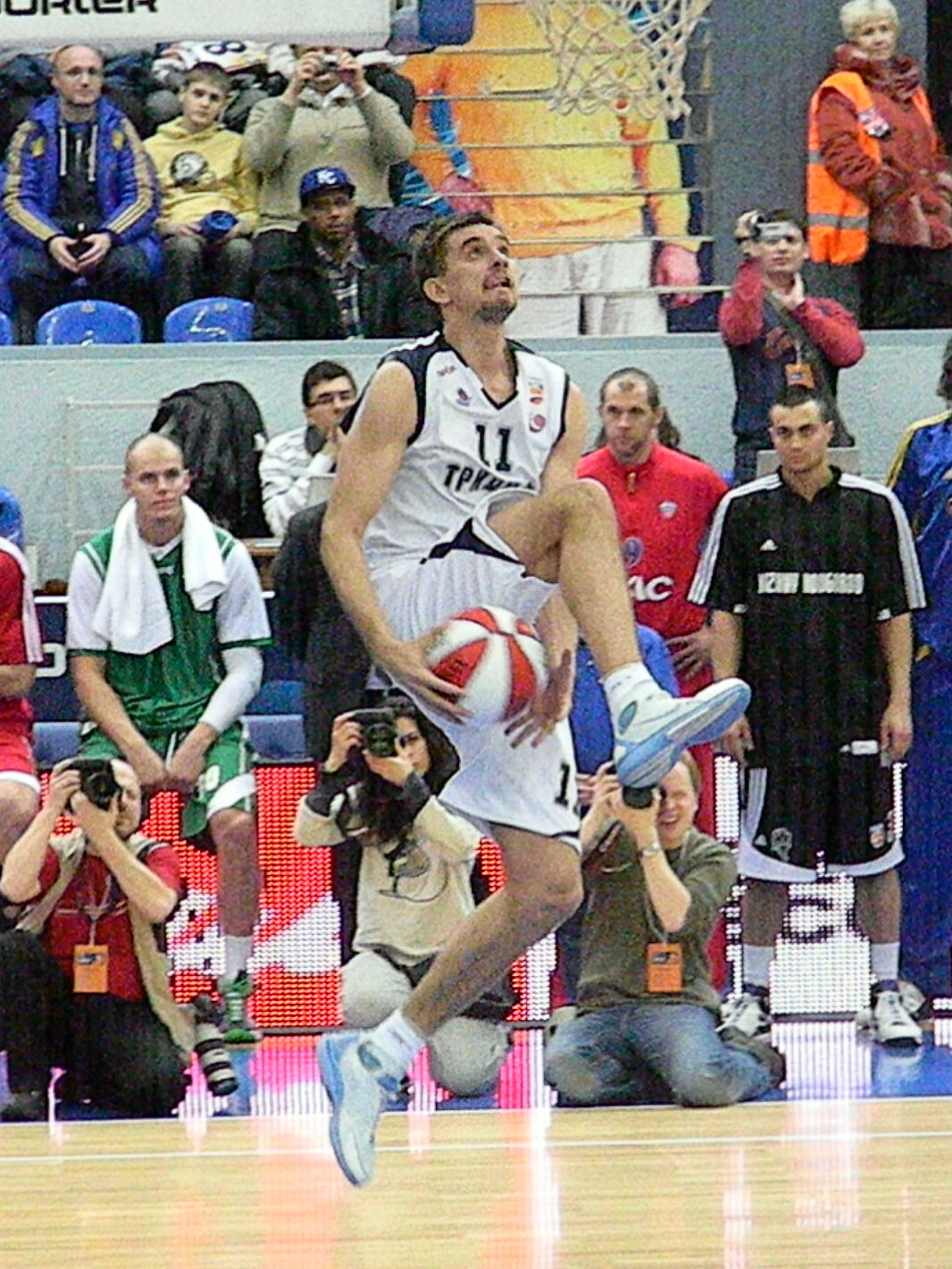
- Likhodey for Triumph Lyubertsy in 2011

Personal information
- Born: 23 October 1986 (age 40) Rostov-on-Don, Russian SFSR, Soviet Union
- Listed height: 6 ft 8.5 in (2.04 m)
- Listed weight: 220 lb (100 kg)

Career information
- NBA draft: 2008: undrafted
- Playing career: 2003–2025

Career history
- 2003–2004: CSKA Moscow
- 2004–2008: CSK VVS Samara
- 2008–2011: Triumph Lyubertsy
- 2011–2012: Spartak Saint Petersburg
- 2012–2014: Lokomotiv Kuban
- 2014–2016: UNICS
- 2016–2017: Khimki
- 2017–2018: Nevėžis
- 2018: Orlandina
- 2018–2019: Włocławek
- 2019–2020: UNICS
- 2020–2021: Włocławek
- 2021: Legia Warszawa
- 2022–2023: BC Astana
- 2025: Dynamo (Grozny)

Career highlights
- EuroCup champion (2013); FIBA EuroCup Challenge champion (2007)

Valery Vitalevich Likhodey (alternative spelling: Valerii Likhodei) (Russian: Валерий Витальевич Лиходей; born 23 October 1986) is a Russian former professional basketball.

== Professional career ==
During his professional career, Likhodey has played with CSKA Moscow, CSK VVS Samara, Triumph Lyubertsy, Spartak Saint Petersburg.

In June 2012, he signed with Lokomotiv Kuban. In July 2014, he parted ways with Lokomotiv.

On 17 July 2014 he signed a one-year deal with UNICS Kazan. On 22 June 2015 he re-signed with UNICS for one more season.

On 29 June 2016 he signed with Khimki for the 2016–17 season.

In August 2017, he moved to Lithuanian club Nevėžis.

On 23 February 2018 Likhodey signed with the Italian club Orlandina Basket. In August 2018 he signed one year deal with polish Anwil Włocławek.

On 27 June 2019 he signed 1+1 year contract with UNICS of the VTB United League.

On 6 July 2020 he signed with Anwil Włocławek of the Polish Basketball League.

On 3 February 2021 he signed with Legia Warszawa of the Polish Basketball League.

On 21 November 2022 he signed with BC Astana of the Kazakhstan Basketball Championship and the VTB United League.

== Career statistics ==
Legend
GP	Games played	GS	Games started	MPG	Minutes per game
FG%	Field-goal percentage	3P%	3-point field-goal percentage	FT%	Free-throw percentage
RPG	Rebounds per game	APG	Assists per game	SPG	Steals per game
BPG	Blocks per game	PPG	Points per game	PIR	Performance index rating
**Bold**	Career high

=== EuroLeague ===
*	Led the league

Year	Team	GP	GS	MPG	FG%	3P%	FT%	RPG	APG	SPG	BPG	PPG	PIR
2013–14	Lokomotiv Kuban	**21**	**3**	**14.9**	**.483**	**.547***	**.455**	**2.0**	**.2**	**.2**	**.4**	**5.9**	**4.9**
2014–15	UNICS	4	0	1.3	.000	—	—	.3	—	—	.3	0.0	0.0
Career		25	3	12.7	.477	.547	.455	1.7	.2	.2	.4	5.0	4.1

== Awards and accomplishments ==
=== Club career ===
- EuroCup champion: (2013)
- FIBA EuroCup Challenge champion (2007)
- Russian League All-Star: (2011)

=== Russian Junior National team ===
- 2009 Summer Universiade: Silver
