= Omar Cook =

American-born Montenegrin basketball player (born 1982)

Omar Cook Омар Кук
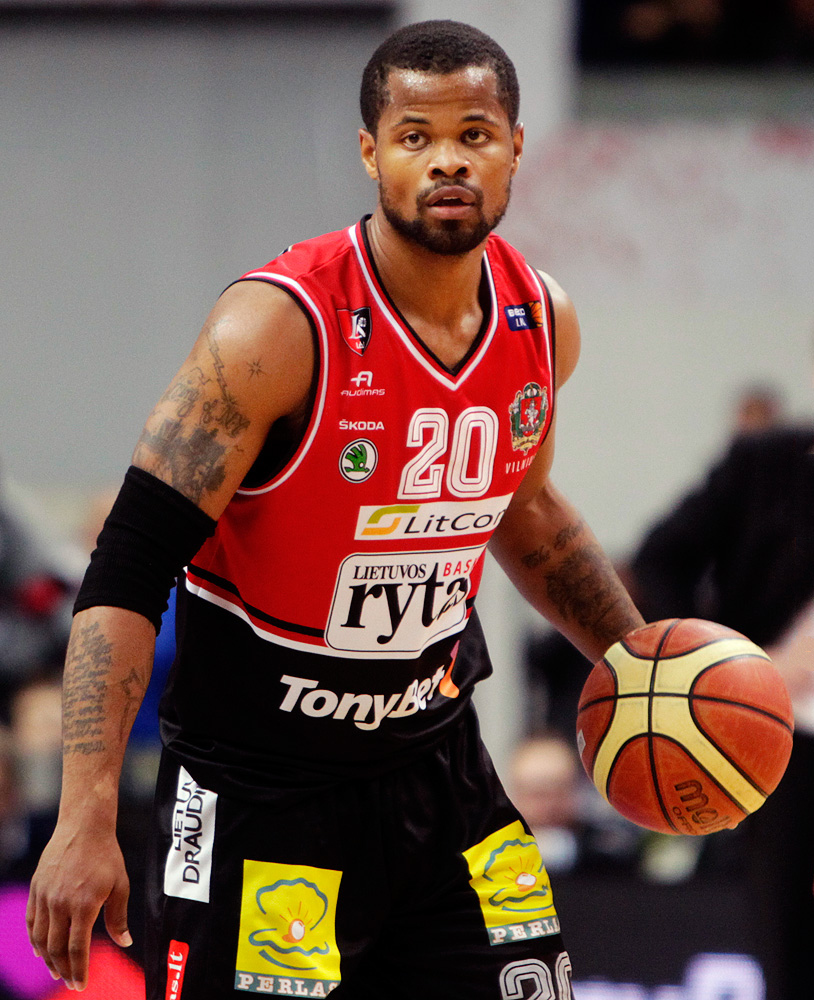
- Cook with Lietuvos rytas in 2014

Cleveland Cavaliers
- Title: Assistant coach
- League: NBA

Personal information
- Born: January 28, 1982 (age 44) Brooklyn, New York, U.S.
- Listed height: 6 ft 1 in (1.85 m)
- Listed weight: 190 lb (86 kg)

Career information
- High school: Christ The King (Queens, New York)
- College: St. John's (2000–2001)
- NBA draft: 2001: 2nd round, 32nd overall pick
- Drafted by: Orlando Magic
- Playing career: 2001–2022
- Position: Point guard
- Number: 10, 1, 00, 20,
- Coaching career: 2022–present

Career history

Playing
- 2001–2005: Fayetteville Patriots
- 2004: Portland Trail Blazers
- 2005: Toronto Raptors
- 2005–2006: Mons-Hainaut
- 2006–2007: Samara
- 2007: Strasbourg
- 2007–2008: Crvena zvezda
- 2008–2010: Unicaja
- 2010–2011: Valencia
- 2011–2012: Olimpia Milano
- 2012–2013: Baskonia
- 2013–2014: Rytas
- 2014–2016: Budućnost
- 2016–2019: Estudiantes
- 2019–2020: Gran Canaria
- 2020–2021: San Pablo Burgos
- 2021–2022: Casademont Zaragoza

Coaching
- 2022–2023: Cleveland Charge (assistant)
- 2023–present: Cleveland Cavaliers (assistant)

Career highlights
- 2× EuroLeague assists leader (2010, 2012); 2× Champions League champion (2020, 2021); Champions League assists leader (2018); FIBA Intercontinental Cup champion (2021); FIBA EuroCup Challenge champion (2007); ABA League assists leader (2016); 3× Liga ACB assists leader (2010, 2018, 2019); LKL assists leader (2014); LKL steals leader (2014); 2× Montenegrin League champion (2015, 2016); 2× Montenegrin Cup winner (2015, 2016); Belgian Cup winner (2006); BPBL assists leader (2006); BLS assists leader (2008); 3× All-NBDL Second Team (2002, 2004, 2005); NBDL assists leader (2002); First-team Parade All-American (2000); McDonald's All-American (2000)
- Stats at NBA.com
- Stats at Basketball Reference

Omar-Sharif Cook (Montenegrin: Omar-Šarif Kuk / Омар-Шариф Кук; born January 28, 1982) is an American-Montenegrin professional basketball coach and former player who is an assistant coach for the Cleveland Cavaliers of the National Basketball Association (NBA). He represented Montenegro internationally. Prior to entering the draft he was considered a top 10 overall prospect by several NBA scouts.

== Amateur career ==
Cook played high school basketball at Christ The King Regional High School, and then played college basketball at St. John's University. Cook ranked second in the nation and first in the Big East in assists during the one year he spent at St. John's. He also broke Mark Jackson's record for the most assists in a game for a St. John's player with 17, against Stony Brook University.

== Professional career ==
Cook was drafted by the Orlando Magic of the NBA as the third pick in the second round (31st overall) of the 2001 NBA draft. He was immediately traded to the Denver Nuggets, but failed to make the team, reportedly because of his inability to shoot the ball effectively. From 2001 to 2004, Cook made some pre-season appearances for teams in the league, also managing 22 regular season games played (17 with the Portland Trail Blazers in the 2003–04 season and five with the Toronto Raptors in the 2004–05 season). In July 2005, he was drafted by the AAPBL, but the league folded less than two weeks after the draft.

He also briefly led the NBA D-League in steals and assists in the 2004–05 season, while playing with the Fayetteville Patriots. Cook's final NBA game was played on April 20, 2005, in a 104–95 victory over the Cleveland Cavaliers. In his final game, Cook recorded 19 points, 9 assists, 2 rebounds, 2 steals and 1 block.

During the 2005–06 season, Cook played in the Belgian league with Dexia Mons-Hainaut. The following year, he played with two teams, the French Pro A club SIG Strasbourg and the Russian Super League club Samara. In the 2007–08 season, he played with the Adriatic League club Crvena zvezda. He had the best season of his career with Crvena zvezda, where he was one of the team leaders.

On June 26, 2008, he joined the Spanish league's Unicaja, signing with the club for two seasons. In 2010, he signed a two-year deal with Spanish basketball club Power Electronics Valencia.

In 2011, he signed a two-year deal with Italian team Armani Jeans Milano. In December 2012, after Milano was eliminated from the Euroleague, Cook signed with Caja Laboral until the end of the season.

On August 6, 2013, Cook signed with Lietuvos rytas of Lithuania for the 2013–14 season.

On September 30, 2014, Cook signed a two-month deal with Budućnost Podgorica of Montenegro. On November 14, 2014, he extended his contract with Budućnost for the rest of the season. On August 15, 2015, he re-signed with Budućnost for one more season.

On August 20, 2016, Cook signed with Spanish club Estudiantes for the 2016–17 season. On July 17, 2019, Cook signed a one-plus-one deal with Herbalife Gran Canaria.

On July 24, 2020, he has signed with San Pablo Burgos of the Liga ACB.

On July 15, 2021, he has signed with Casademont Zaragoza of the Liga ACB.

== Coaching career ==
On September 29, 2022, Cook was hired as an assistant coach for the Cleveland Charge of the NBA G League.

On October 24, 2023, Cook was hired as an assistant coach by the Cleveland Cavaliers.

== Career statistics ==
Legend
GP	Games played	GS	Games started	MPG	Minutes per game
FG%	Field-goal percentage	3P%	3-point field-goal percentage	FT%	Free-throw percentage
RPG	Rebounds per game	APG	Assists per game	SPG	Steals per game
BPG	Blocks per game	PPG	Points per game	PIR	Performance index rating
**Bold**	Career high

=== NBA ===
==== Regular season ====
Year	Team	GP	GS	MPG	FG%	3P%	FT%	RPG	APG	SPG	BPG	PPG
2003–04	Portland	**17**	0	8.2	.259	.000	.000	.4	1.4	.6	.0	.8
2004–05	Toronto	5	0	**14.8**	**.417**	.000	**.500**	**1.4**	**4.4**	**1.2**	**.2**	**4.6**
Career		22	0	9.7	.333	.000	.500	.6	2.1	.7	.0	1.7

=== EuroLeague ===
*	Led the league

Year	Team	GP	GS	MPG	FG%	3P%	FT%	RPG	APG	SPG	BPG	PPG	PIR
2008–09	Málaga	16	11	23.5	.365	.391	.750	1.9	5.1	1.3	—	5.6	7.8
2009–10	Málaga	16	15	27.9	.408	.385	**.794**	1.8	**5.9***	1.2	**.1**	**9.7**	10.9
2010–11	Valencia	**21**	**21**	**30.0**	.386	.361	.791	**2.4**	5.5	**1.8**	.0	8.0	10.9
2011–12	Milano	16	16	**30.0**	.354	.368	.700	**2.4**	5.7*	1.0	—	7.3	**11.0**
2012–13	Milano	10	10	28.2	**.480**	**.462**	.583	1.7	5.0	1.4	—	7.3	9.8
2012–13	Baskonia	18	8	20.4	.322	.333	.500	1.1	3.5	1.2	—	3.1	4.5
2013–14	Rytas	8	7	29.6	.263	.297	.727	1.6	**5.9**	1.3	—	6.1	6.5
Career		105	88	26.9	.372	.372	.738	1.9	5.2	1.3	.0	6.7	8.9

== Montenegrin national team ==
In May 2008, Cook received Montenegrin citizenship, thus applying to represent Montenegro's national basketball team.
