= Tuborg Pilsener S.K. =

Tuborg Pilsener
- Founded: 1993
- Dissolved: 2006
- History: Tuborg (1993-1999); Troy Pilsner (1999-2003); Tuborg Pilsener (2003-2006)
- Arena: İzmir Atatürk Spor Salonu
- Capacity: 6,000
- Location: İzmir, Turkey
Home	Away

Tuborg Pilsener Spor Kulübü (in English: Tuborg Pilsener Sports Club) was a professional basketball club based in İzmir, Turkey.

== History ==
The club was founded in 1971 in İzmir, under the name Izmir Swimming Specialization Club Association ("İzmir Yüzme İhtisas Kulübü Derneği") as a specialized sports club. On May 23, 1978, the club was included in the Yaşar Holding Club and has been named Tuborg Swimming Specialization Club Association. In 1989 the club adopted the name Spring Swimming Specialization Club-Society and in 1992 renamed to Tuborg S.K. changed as the club is primarily funded by the company that bears the name and supported.

The basketball branch was established in 1993. On July 18, 2003, the club changed its name to Tuborg Pilsener. After the 2005–06 season, club has decided to withdraw from Turkish League.

== Honours ==
FIBA EuroCup Challenge

- Third place: 2003–04
