= Nikita Shabalkin =

Russian basketball player

Personal information
- Born: 9 October 1986 (age 40) Vladikavkaz, Russia
- Listed height: 6 ft 9 in (2.06 m)
- Listed weight: 232 lb (105 kg)

Career information
- NBA draft: 2008: undrafted
- Playing career: 2004–2013
- Position: Small forward / power forward

Career history
- 2004–2006: CSK VVS Samara
- 2005–2006: CSKA Moscow
- 2006–2007: CSK VVS Samara
- 2007–2009: Khimki
- 2009–2010: Triumph Lyubertsy
- 2010–2011: Dynamo Moscow
- 2011–2013: Lokomotiv Kuban
- 2013: UNICS

Career highlights
- FIBA EuroCup Challenge champion (2007); FIBA EuroCup Challenge Finals MVP (2007)

Nikita Shabalkin (born October 9, 1986) is a Russian former professional basketball player. At a height of 2.06 m (6 ft 9 in) tall, and a weight of 105 kg (231 lb), he played at both the small forward and power forward positions.

== Professional career ==
Shabalkin last played for UNICS Kazan, of the Russian PBL.

== National team career ==
Shabalkin was a member of the senior men's Russian national basketball team. With Russia's senior national team, he played at the EuroBasket 2007, where he won a gold medal, and at the EuroBasket 2011, where he won a bronze medal.
