= BC Euras =

Euras
- Founded: 2001
- Dissolved: 2005
- History: BC Euras (2001–2005)
- Arena: Palace of Sports
- Capacity: 5,000
- Location: Yekaterinburg, Russia

BC Euras (Russian: Евраз) was a Russian basketball club, based in Yekaterinburg. The team was active from 2001 until 2005, years in which it played in the Super League A, the first tier in Russia as well as the Super League B. Euras also played in European competitions twice; in the 2003–04 FIBA Europe Cup Euras had a 2–4 record and in the 2004–05 season the team had a 5–5 record, finishing fourth in the Conference North.

== History ==
In its first season, the 2001–02 season, Euras played in the Super League B and immediately promoted to the highest level as runner-up of the league. In the 2002–03 season, Euras finished as the fifth best team in the Super League A.

On 30 July 2005, the club was expelled from the Super League A.
