= 2005–06 FIBA EuroCup Challenge =

- League: FIBA EuroCup Challenge
- Sport: Basketball

Finals
- Champions: (Russia) Ural Great Perm
- Runners-up: (Ukraine) Khimik

FIBA EuroCup Challenge seasons
- ← 2004–05 2006–07 →

The 2005–06 FIBA EuroCup Challenge was the fourth edition of Europe's fourth-tier level transnational competition for men's professional basketball clubs. 24 teams participated in the season's competition. The Russian team Ural Great Perm won the title, after beating the Ukrainian team Khimik in the double-legged final.

== Teams of the 2005-06 FIBA EuroCup Challenge ==
Country	Teams	Clubs		
Czech Republic	3	Mlékárna Kunín	A plus OHL ŽS Brno	Prostějov
Cyprus	3	APOEL	Apollon Limassol	Keravnos Keo
Albania	1	Valbona Bajram Curri		
Austria	1	Superfund Bulls		
Azerbaijan	1	Gala Baku		
Croatia	1	Dubrovnik		
Denmark	1	Skovbakken		
Finland	1	Lappeenrannan NMKY		
Greece	1	Olympia Larissa		
Hungary	1	Debreceni Vadkakasok		
Iceland	1	Keflavík		
Israel	1	Ironi Ashkelon		
Latvia	1	Rīga		
Netherlands	1	Tulip Den Bosch		
Portugal	1	Madeira		
Romania	1	U-Mobitelco Cluj-Napoca		
Russia	1	Ural Great Perm		
Switzerland	1	Boncourt		
Turkey	1	Bandırma Banvit		
Ukraine	1	Khimik		

== Regular season ==
Key to colors
Top two places in each group advance to quarterfinals
Eliminated

=== Group A ===
	Team	Pld	W	L	PF	PA	Diff	Tie-break
1.	(Cyprus) Keravnos Keo	4	3	1	318	271	+47	1–1 (+10)
2.	(Greece) Olympia Larissa	4	3	1	365	271	+94	1–1 (-10)
3.	(Albania) Valbona Bajram Curri	4	0	4	246	387	-141	

=== Group B ===
	Team	Pld	W	L	PF	PA	Diff	Tie-break
1.	(Switzerland) Boncourt	4	3	1	355	332	+23	1–1 (+1)
2.	(Hungary) Debreceni Vadkakasok	4	3	1	353	341	+12	1–1 (-1)
3.	(Czech Republic) Prostějov	4	0	4	326	361	–35	

=== Group C ===
	Team	Pld	W	L	PF	PA	Diff	Tie-break
1.	(Finland) Lappeenrannan NMKY	4	4	0	341	299	+42	
2.	(Iceland) Keflavík	4	1	3	354	373	–19	1–1 (+13)
3.	(Latvia) Rīga	4	1	3	336	359	–23	1–1 (-13)

=== Group D ===
	Team	Pld	W	L	PF	PA	Diff	Tie-break
1.	(Portugal) Madeira	4	3	1	361	331	+30	
2.	(Netherlands) Tulip Den Bosch	4	2	2	296	317	–21	
3.	(Denmark) Skovbakken	4	1	3	314	323	–9	

=== Group E ===
	Team	Pld	W	L	PF	PA	Diff	Tie-break
1.	(Cyprus) APOEL	4	3	1	357	316	+41	
2.	(Israel) Ironi Ashkelon	4	2	2	336	350	–14	
3.	(Romania) U-Mobitelco Cluj-Napoca	4	1	3	316	343	–27	

=== Group F ===
	Team	Pld	W	L	PF	PA	Diff	Tie-break
1.	(Czech Republic) Mlékárna Kunín	4	3	1	341	320	+21	1–1 (+11)
2.	(Turkey) Bandırma Banvit	4	3	1	286	287	–1	1–1 (-11)
3.	(Austria) Superfund Bulls	4	0	4	282	302	–20	

=== Group G ===
	Team	Pld	W	L	PF	PA	Diff	Tie-break
1.	(Cyprus) Apollon Limassol	4	3	1	326	274	+52	
2.	(Croatia) Dubrovnik	4	2	2	313	320	–7	
3.	(Czech Republic) A plus OHL ŽS Brno	4	1	3	277	322	–45	

=== Group H ===
	Team	Pld	W	L	PF	PA	Diff	Tie-break
1.	(Russia) Ural Great Perm	4	4	0	358	303	+55	
2.	(Ukraine) Khimik	4	1	3	314	297	+17	1–1 (+21)
3.	(Azerbaijan) Gala Baku	4	1	3	278	350	–72	1–1 (-21)

== Top 16 ==
The top 16 were two-legged ties determined on aggregate score. The first legs was played on December 8. All return legs were played on December 15.

Team 1	Agg.	Team 2	1st leg	2nd leg
Olympia Larissa (Greece)	159–145	(Switzerland) Boncourt	79–63	80–82
Debreceni Vadkakasok (Hungary)	149–143	(Cyprus) Keravnos Keo	81–71	68–72
Keflavík (Iceland)	177–213	(Portugal) Madeira	87–108	90–105
Tulip Den Bosch (Netherlands)	181–183	(Finland) Lappeenrannan NMKY	104–102	77–81
Ironi Ashkelon (Israel)	187–179	(Czech Republic) Mlékárna Kunín	95–103	92–76
Bandırma Banvit (Turkey)	142–159	(Cyprus) APOEL	76–59	66–100
Dubrovnik (Croatia)	144–189	(Russia) Ural Great Perm	78–85	66–104
Khimik (Ukraine)	196–152	(Cyprus) Apollon Limassol	110–76	86–76

== Quarterfinals ==
The quarterfinals were two-legged ties determined on aggregate score. The first legs was played on January 19. All return legs were played on January 26.

Team 1	Agg.	Team 2	1st leg	2nd leg
Olympia Larissa (Greece)	167–159	(Portugal) Madeira	90–64	77–95
Debreceni Vadkakasok (Hungary)	159–167	(Finland) Lappeenrannan NMKY	88–73	71–94
Ironi Ashkelon (Israel)	136–175	(Russia) Ural Great Perm	69–90	67–85
APOEL (Cyprus)	134–164	(Ukraine) Khimik	82–71	52–93

== Semifinals ==
The semifinals were two-legged ties determined on aggregate score. The first legs was played on February 23. All return legs were played on March 2.

Team 1	Agg.	Team 2	1st leg	2nd leg
Khimik (Ukraine)	167–159	(Finland) Lappeenrannan NMKY	88–61	71–49
Olympia Larissa (Greece)	136–165	(Russia) Ural Great Perm	71–81	65–84

== Finals ==
Team 1	Agg.	Team 2	1st leg	2nd leg
Khimik (Ukraine)	147–154	(Russia) Ural Great Perm	67–80	80–74

2005–06 FIBA EuroCup Challenge

Ural Great Perm
1st title

== Sources ==
- Statistics
