= FIBA EuroCup Challenge =

Club basketball tournament in Europe

- Sport: Basketball
- Founded: 2002; as Champions Cup
- Folded: 2007
- Motto: We Are Basketball
- No. of teams: 16
- Continent: Europe
- Last champions: (Russia) Samara (1st title)
- Most titles: (Greece) Aris (Ukraine) MBC Mariupol (Cyprus) EKA AEL (Germany) Mitteldeutscher (Romania) Asesoft Ploiești (Russia) Ural Great Perm (Russia) Samara (1 title each)
- Level on pyramid: 3 (2002-03); 4 (2003-07)
- Promotion to: FIBA EuroChallenge – (3rd tier)
- Website: FIBA EuroCup EuroChallenge

The FIBA EuroCup Challenge was the 4th-tier level transnational professional continental club basketball competition in Europe, organised by FIBA Europe. However, it was considered Europe's 3rd tier level club basketball competition in its inaugural 2002–03 season.

The competition was founded in 2002, following a conflict between FIBA Europe and ULEB during the 2001–02 season. It was an attempt by FIBA to expand its secondary tournament held during the previous season:, the FIBA Europe Regional Challenge Cup, by merging it with the FIBA Europe Champions Cup.

Each season's finalists were promoted to the next season's more prestigious 3rd-tier level competition, the FIBA EuroChallenge. The competition ultimately ceased in 2007.

== History ==
In 2002, FIBA Europe abolished its two main club tournaments, the FIBA Saporta Cup and the FIBA Korac Cup, and invited European teams to join their two newly formed competitions, the FIBA Europe Champions Cup and the FIBA Europe Regional Challenge Cup, which would function as FIBA's premium and secondary-tier tournaments, respectively, in an attempt to compete against the newly formed EuroLeague, already run by ULEB since 2001.

However, the revived Champions Cup never became a true rival to the ULEB Euroleague, and FIBA therefore decided that a pan-European competition, on top of the previous season's regional competition, would be organised for the 2003–04 season. The FIBA Europe League was launched in 2003, as its top competition and the FIBA Europe Champions Cup ultimately merged with FIBA's second-tier tournament, the FIBA Europe Regional Challenge Cup, to form the FIBA Europe Cup, which instead functioned as FIBA Europe's second-tier tournament, and the fourth-tier overall on the European pyramid.

The competition was played during the 2002–03 to 2006–07 seasons. It was variously known as the FIBA Europe Championship Cup / FIBA Europe Regional Challenge Cup (2002–03), the FIBA Europe Cup (2003–05), and the FIBA EuroCup Challenge (2005–07).

Overall during those five seasons, several historic European clubs played in the competition, such as ASK Riga, Fenerbahçe, Split, Khimki Moscow Region, EKA AEL, Bayer Giants Leverkusen, Azovmash Mariupol, PAOK Thessaloniki, Hapoel Jerusalem, Rytas, Ventspils, Ural Great Perm, Belenenses, Academic, UNICS Kazan, Prokom, Dinamo Bucharest, Benetton Fribourg, etc.

=== Names of the competition ===
- FiBA Europe Champions Cup / FIBA Europe Regional Challenge Cup: (2002–2003)
- FIBA Europe Cup: (2003–2005)
- FIBA EuroCup Challenge: (2005–2007)

== Finals ==
Year	Champion		Score	Second place		3rd		4th	
2002–03 (FECC)	(Greece); Aris Thessaloniki		84 – 83	(Poland); Prokom Trefl Sopot		(Latvia); Ventspils		(Serbia and Montenegro); Hemofarm	
2002–03 (FERCC)	North	(Ukraine); Mariupol	88 – 61	North	(Germany); Bayer Leverkusen	North	(Hungary); Kaposvári	North	(Ukraine); Khimik
2002–03 (FERCC)	South	(Cyprus); EKA AEL	92 – 82	South	(Bosnia and Herzegovina); Igokea	South	(Romania); West Petrom Arad	South	(Cyprus); Pizza Express Apollon
2003–04	(Germany); Mitteldeutscher		84–68	(France); SAOS Dijon		(Turkey); Tuborg Pilsener		(Russia); Dynamo Moscow Region	
2004–05	(Romania); Asesoft Ploiești		75–74	(Russia); Lokomotiv Rostov		(Russia); Dynamo Moscow Region		(Turkey); Bandırma Banvit	
2005–06	(Russia); Ural Great Perm		154–147; 80–67 / 74–80	(Ukraine); Khimik		(Greece); Olympia Larissa		(Finland); Lappeenrannan NMKY	
2006–07	(Russia); Samara		184–166; 83–85 / 101–81	(Cyprus); Keravnos		(Cyprus); Pizza Express Apollon		(Ukraine); Dnipro	

== Finals MVP ==
Season	Player	Pos.	Club
2002–03 (FECC)	(United States) Will Solomon	PG/SG	(Greece) Aris Thessaloniki
2002–03 (RCC)	(United States) Duane Woodward	PG/SG	(Cyprus) EKA AEL
2003–04	(Lithuania) Marijonas Petravičius	PF/C	(Germany) Mitteldeutscher
2004–05	(Serbia) Vladimir Kuzmanović	SG	(Romania) Asesoft Ploiești
2005–06	(United States) Derrick Alston	PF/C	(Russia) Ural Great Perm
2006–07	(Russia) Nikita Shabalkin	SF / PF	(Russia) Samara

== Titles by club ==
Rank	Club	Titles	Runner-up	Champion years
1	(Greece) Aris Thessaloniki	1	0	2002–03 (A)
1	(Ukraine) Mariupol	1	0	2002–03 (B)
1	(Cyprus) EKA AEL Limassol	1	0	2002–03 (B)
1	(Germany) Mitteldeutscher	1	0	2003–04
1	(Romania) Asesoft Ploiești	1	0	2004–05
1	(Russia) Ural Great Perm	1	0	2005–06
1	(Russia) Samara	1	0	2006–07
6	(Germany) Bayer Leverkusen	0	1	
6	(Bosnia and Herzegovina) Igokea	0	1	
6	(Poland) Prokom Trefl Sopot	0	1	
6	(France) Dijon	0	1	
6	(Russia) Lokomotiv Kuban	0	1	
6	(Ukraine) Khimik	0	1	
6	(Cyprus) Keravnos	0	1	
Total		7	7	

== Winning rosters ==
FIBA Europe Regional Challenge Cup:

North Conference:

- 2002–03 (Ukraine) Mariupol

Volodymyr Gurtovyy, Andriy Kapinos, Andriy Botichev, Oleksandr Skutyelnik, Igor Kharchenko, Sergiy Moskalenko, Petro Podtykan, Yevhenii Annienkov, Dmytro Briantsev (Head Coach: Andrij Podkovyrov)

South Conference:

- 2002–03 (Cyprus) EKA AEL Limassol

Dimitris Prokopiou, Marcos Asonitis, Georgios Kouzapas, Michalis Kounounis, Davor Kurilic, Konstantinos Perentos, Ranko Velimirovic, David Michael Van Dyke, Christos Spyrou, Duane Woodward (Head Coach: Dragan Raca).

FIBA Europe Cup:

- 2003–04 (Germany) Mitteldeutscher

Wendell Alexis, Manuchar Markoishvili, Paul Burke, Marijonas Petravičius, Misan Nikagbatse, Sebastian Machowski, Stephen Arigbabu, Jonas Elvikis, Per Ringstrom, Chauncey Leslie, Peter Fehse, Paul Bayer, Michael Krikemans (Head Coach: Henrik Dettmann)

- 2004–05 (Romania) Asesoft Ploiești

Cătălin Burlacu, Ivan Krasic, Nikola Bulatović, Vladimir Kuzmanović, Paul Helcioiu, Marko Rakočević, Rares Apostol, Antonio Alexe, Levente Szijarto, Predrag Materić, Nicolae Toader, Marko Peković, Adrian Blidaru, Saša Ocokoljić (Head Coach: Mladjen Jojic)

FIBA EuroCup Challenge:

- 2005–06 (Russia) Ural Great Perm

Derrick Alston, Terrell Lyday, Vasily Karasev, Jurica Golemac, Jasmin Hukić, Andre Hutson, Andrei Trushkin, Egor Vyaltsev, Vadim Panin, Evgeni Kolesnikov, Aleksandr Dedushkin, Arseni Kuchinsky, Vyacheslav Shushakov, Artem Kuzyakin (Head Coach: Sharon Drucker)

- 2006–07 (Russia) Samara

Nikita Shabalkin, Omar Cook, Georgios Diamantopoulos, Kelvin Gibbs, Evgeni Voronov, Pavel Agapov, Gennadi Zelenskiy, Yaroslav Strelkin, Oleg Baranov, Pavel Ulyanko, Taras Osipov, Anton Glazunov, Alexei Kiryanov, Valeri Likhodey (Head Coach: Valeri Tikhonenko)

== See also ==
- FIBA EuroChallenge
- FIBA Europe Regional Challenge Cup
