= JDA Dijon Basket =

JDA Dijon
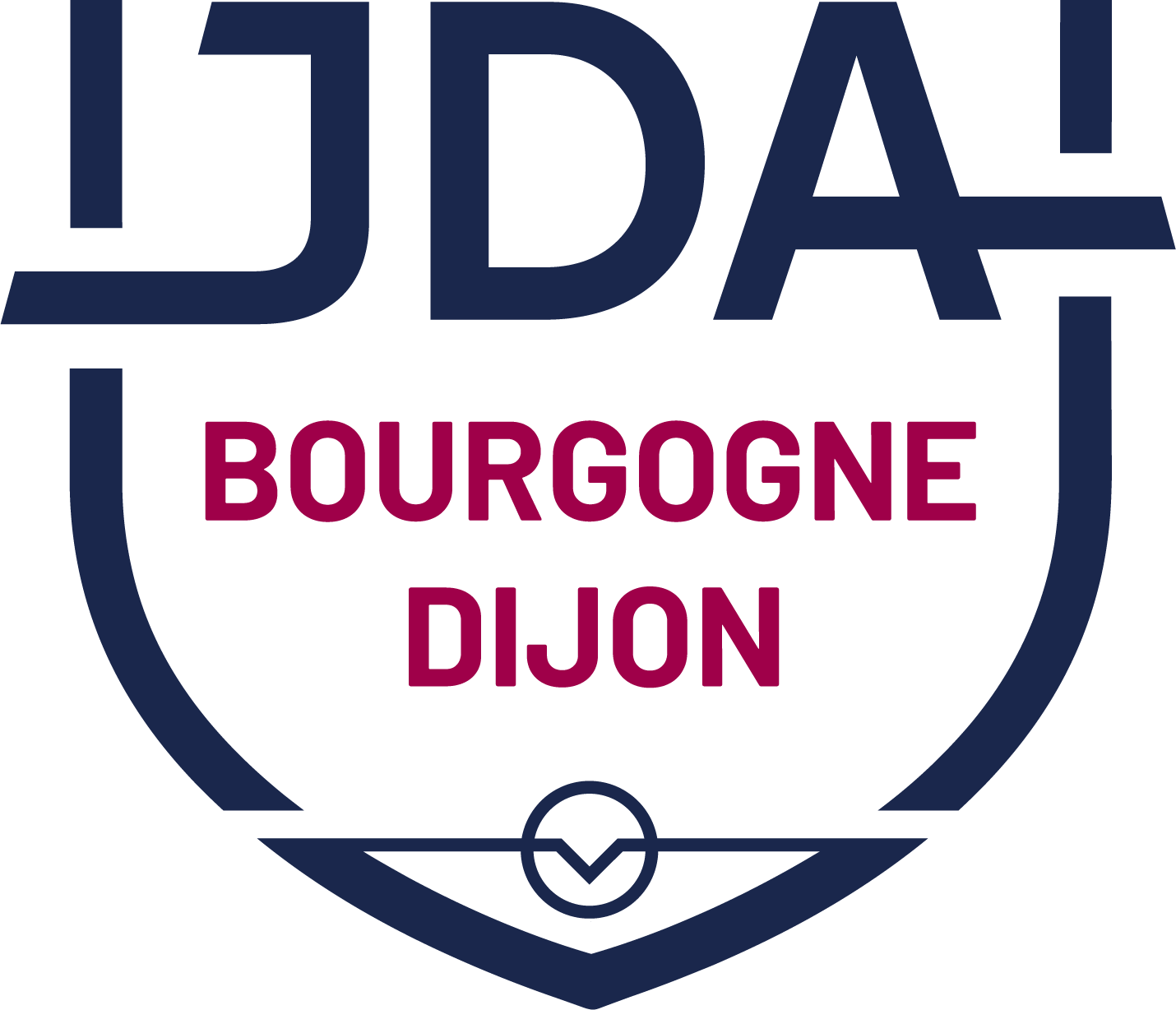
- Nickname: La Jeanne
- Leagues: Pro A
- Founded: 1880; 146 years ago
- Arena: Palais des Sports Jean-Michel Geoffroy
- Capacity: 5,000
- Location: Dijon, France
- President: Thierry Degorce
- Team manager: Jean-Louis Borg
- Head coach: Vincent Dumestre
- Championships: 3 French Cups; 1 French Supercup
- Website: jdadijon.com
Home	Away

Jeanne d'Arc Dijon Basket, commonly known as JDA Dijon Basket or simply Dijon, is a professional basketball club from the city of Dijon, France. The club currently plays in the LNB Pro A, the French first tier division. The club has won the French Federation Cup three times: in 1993, 2006 and 2024.

The club is named after Joan of Arc, a heroine in French history.

== History ==
The logo used until 2022

The club, named after Joan of Arc, was founded in 1880, as a sports club active in gymnastics, football, as well as cultural activities such as theatre.

In the 2003–04 season, JDA reached the finals of the FIBA EuroCup Challenge, the continent's fourth tier level. In its first European final ever, Dijon lost to German club Mitteldeutscher BC, by a score of 68–84.

Dijon played in the 2019–20 FIBA Champions League, marking its return to European-wide competitions for the first time since 2014. The team won the bronze medal after defeating Zaragoza in the third place game.

In the 2020–21 season, Dijon reached the Finals of the LNB Pro A for the first time in club history, after defeating Monaco in the semi-final. In the single-game Finals, Dijon lost to ASVEL.

On April 27, 2024, Dijon won their third French Cup after they defeated Strasbourg in the final in the Accor Arena.

== Arena ==
JDA Dijon Basket plays its home games at the Palais des Sports Jean-Michel Geoffroy, which has a seating capacity of 5,000.

== Honors and titles ==
=== Domestic competitions ===
- LNB Pro A
  - Runners-up (1): 2020–21
- French Federation Cup
  - Champions (3): 1993, 2006, 2024
- French League Cup
  - Champions (1): 2020
- French Supercup
  - Champions (1): 2006

=== European competitions ===
- FIBA Champions League
  - Third place (1): 2019–20
- FIBA Europe Cup
  - Runners-up (1): 2003–04

== Season by season ==
Season	Tier	League	Pos.	French Cup	Leaders Cup	European competitions	
2010–11	2	LNB Pro B	2nd	Second round			
2011–12	1	LNB Pro A	9th	Second round			
2012–13	1	LNB Pro A	7th	Second round		3 EuroChallenge	RS
2013–14	1	LNB Pro A	5th	Semifinalist	Quarterfinalist	3 EuroChallenge	L16
2014–15	1	LNB Pro A	10th	Semifinalist			
2015–16	1	LNB Pro A	9th		Quarterfinalist		
2016–17	1	LNB Pro A	12th	Quarterfinalist			
2017–18	1	LNB Pro A	5th	Round of 32			
2018–19	1	LNB Pro A	3rd	Quarterfinalist	Quarterfinalist		
2019–20	1	LNB Pro A	2nd (Note: The 2019–20 season was declared void due to the COVID-19 pandemic, Dijon was 2nd in the standings at the time.)		Champion	Champions League	3rd
2020–21	1	LNB Pro A	2nd			Champions League	RS
2021–22	1	LNB Pro A	3rd			Champions League	R16
2022–23	1	LNB Pro A	5th	Quarterfinalist	Semifinalist	Champions League	R16
2023–24	1	LNB Pro A	9th	Champion		Champions League	R16
2024–25	1	LNB Pro A	8th	Quarterfinalist		FIBA Europe Cup	SF

== Players ==
=== Current roster ===
Note: Flags indicate national team eligibility at FIBA-sanctioned events. Players may hold other non-FIBA nationalities not displayed.

JDA Dijon Basket roster
Players
Coaches

Pos.	No.	Nat.	Name	Ht.	Age
PG	1	(United States)	Bibbins, Justin	1.73 m (5 ft 8 in)	30 – 23 January 1996
SG	2	(United States)	Melson, Silas	1.93 m (6 ft 4 in)	30 – 22 August 1996
G	5	(France)	Dadeke, Emrys	1.88 m (6 ft 2 in)	19 – 11 April 2007
SF	9	(France)	Audry, Tom	1.98 m (6 ft 6 in)	19 – 3 September 2007
PG	11	(United States)	Holston, David	1.73 m (5 ft 8 in)	40 – 26 January 1986
PF	13	(Estonia)	Hermet, Kregor	2.05 m (6 ft 9 in)	29 – 9 June 1997
F	19	(Cambodia)	Ndjock, Elwin	2.01 m (6 ft 7 in)	25 – 5 August 2001
F	21	(Jamaica)	Thompson, Shevon	2.01 m (6 ft 7 in)	33 – 10 June 1993
C	22	(France)	Losser, Quentin	2.06 m (6 ft 9 in)	27 – 11 September 1999
SF	24	(United States)	Taylor, Kevion	1.98 m (6 ft 6 in)	27 – 12 January 1999
PF	34	(Lebanon)	Zamatta, Karl	2.03 m (6 ft 8 in)	20 – 7 May 2006
F	44	(Cameroon)	Narace, Williams	2.01 m (6 ft 7 in)	29 – 17 March 1997

Head coach

- (France) Vincent Dumestre

Assistant coach(es)

- (France) Antoine Béguin
- (France) Frédéric Wiscart-Goetz

Legend

- (C) Team captain
- Injured

- Roster
Updated: November 3, 2026

== Notable players ==
Note: Flags indicate national team eligibility at FIBA-sanctioned events. Players may hold other non-FIBA nationalities not displayed.

Criteria

To appear in this section a player must have either:

- Set a club record or won an individual award while at the club
- Played at least one official international match for their national team at any time
- Played at least one official NBA match at any time.

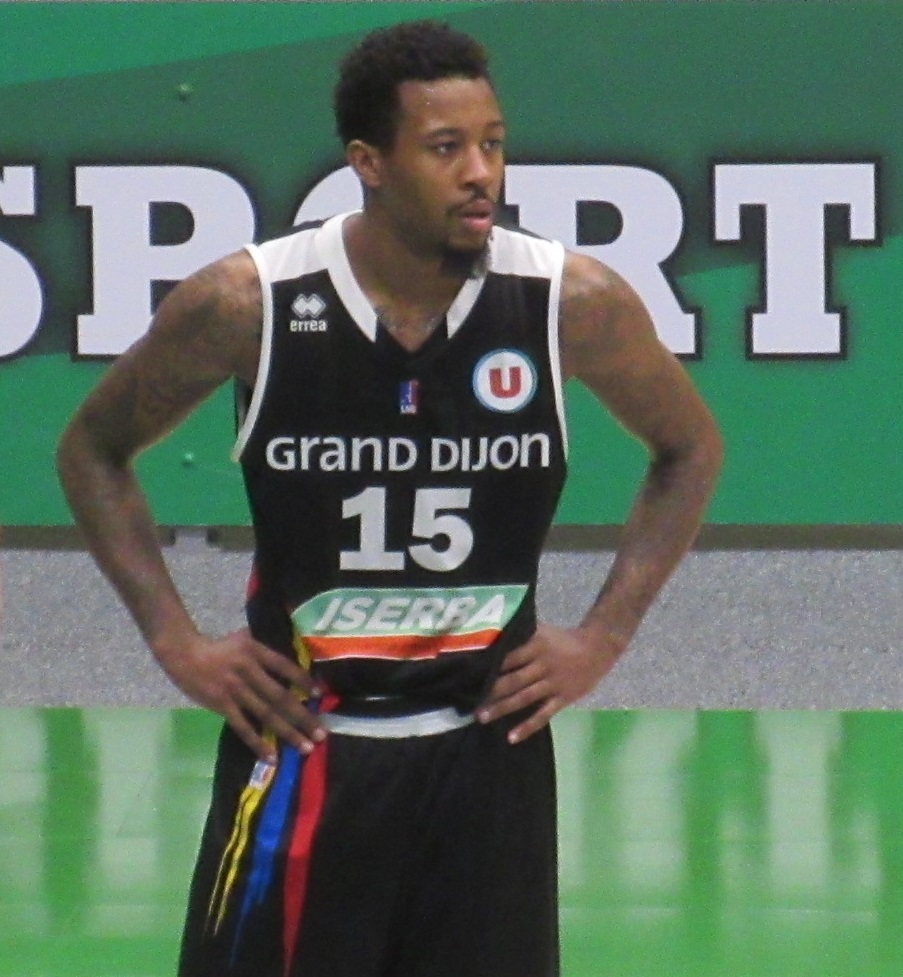
Isaiah Miles, playing for Dijon

- (Canada) Rowan Barrett
- (France) Yakhouba Diawara
- (France) Laurent Sciarra
- (Georgia (country)) Vakhtang Natsvlishvili
- (Georgia (country)) Viktor Sanikidze
- (Israel) (Trinidad and Tobago) (United States) Khadeen Carrington
- (Japan) Nick Fazekas
- (Senegal) Boniface N'Dong
- (United States) Bobby Dixon
- (United States) David Holston
- (United States) Markis McDuffie
- (United States) C. J. Williams
- (United States) Reggie Williams
