= 2006–07 FIBA EuroCup Challenge =

- League: FIBA EuroCup Challenge
- Sport: Basketball
- Top scorer: (United States) LeVar Seals (22.9) (Romania) U-Mobitelco Cluj-Napoca

Finals
- Champions: (Russia) CSK VVS-Samara
- Runners-up: (Cyprus) Keravnos

FIBA EuroCup Challenge seasons
- ← 2005–06

The 2006–07 FIBA EuroCup Challenge was the fifth edition of Europe's fourth-tier level transnational competition for men's professional basketball clubs. The season had the participation of 16 teams. The Russian club CSK VVS-Samara won the title, after beating the Cypriot club Keravnos in the Final.

== Teams of the 2006-07 FIBA EuroCup Challenge ==
Country	Teams	Clubs		
Czech Republic	3	Mlékárna Kunín	Prostějov	A plus OHL ŽS Brno
Cyprus	2	Keravnos	Pizza Express Apollon	
Iceland	2	Keflavík	Njarðvík	
Ukraine	2	Dnipro	Cherkaski Mavpy	
Estonia	1	Tartu ÜSK Rock		
Greece	1	Olympias Patras		
Israel	1	Hapoel Galil Elyon		
Romania	1	U-Mobitelco Cluj-Napoca		
Russia	1	CSK VVS-Samara		
Sweden	1	Holmen Norrköping		
Switzerland	1	Boncourt		

2006–07 FIBA EuroCup Challenge

CSK VVS-Samara BC
1st title

== Regular season ==
Key to colors
Top two places in each group advance to quarterfinals
Eliminated

=== Group A ===
	Team	Pld	W	L	PF	PA	Diff	Tie-break
1.	(Czech Republic) Prostějov	6	4	2	506	488	+18	1–1 (+1)
2.	(Cyprus) Pizza Express Apollon	6	4	2	479	477	+2	1–1 (-1)
3.	(Greece) Olympias Patras	6	3	3	473	448	+25	
4.	(Israel) Hapoel Galil Elyon	6	1	5	502	547	−45	

=== Group B ===
	Team	Pld	W	L	PF	PA	Diff	Tie-break
1.	(Romania) U-Mobitelco Cluj-Napoca	6	4	2	477	494	−17	2–0 (+10)
2.	(Cyprus) Keravnos	6	4	2	522	491	+31	0–2 (-10)
3.	(Czech Republic) A plus OHL ŽS Brno	6	3	3	470	440	+30	
4.	(Switzerland) Boncourt	6	1	5	448	492	−44	

=== Group C ===
	Team	Pld	W	L	PF	PA	Diff	Tie-break
1.	(Russia) CSK VVS-Samara	6	5	1	495	446	+49	
2.	(Ukraine) Cherkaski Mavpy	6	4	2	544	518	+26	
3.	(Estonia) Tartu ÜSK Rock	6	3	3	508	497	+11	
4.	(Iceland) Njarðvík	6	0	6	501	583	−82	

=== Group D ===
	Team	Pld	W	L	PF	PA	Diff	Tie-break
1.	(Ukraine) Dnipro	6	5	1	495	446	+49	
2.	(Czech Republic) Mlékárna Kunín	6	4	2	540	478	+62	
3.	(Sweden) Holmen Norrköping	6	2	4	510	549	−39	
4.	(Iceland) Keflavík	6	1	5	544	616	−72	

== Quarterfinals ==
The quarterfinals were two-legged ties determined on aggregate score. The first legs was played on January 11, 2007. All return legs were played on January 18, 2007.

Team 1	Agg.	Team 2	1st leg	2nd leg
Keravnos (Cyprus)	166–157	(Czech Republic) Prostějov	75–76	91–81
Pizza Express Apollon (Cyprus)	168–146	(Romania) U-Mobitelco Cluj-Napoca	82–71	86–75
Mlékárna Kunín (Czech Republic)	133–165	(Russia) CSK VVS-Samara	64–84	69–81
Cherkaski Mavpy (Ukraine)	169–175	(Ukraine) Dnipro	89–87	80–88

== Semifinals ==
The quarterfinals were two-legged ties determined on aggregate score. The first legs was played on February 28, 2007 and on March 1, 2007. All return legs were played on March 8.

Team 1	Agg.	Team 2	1st leg	2nd leg
Keravnos (Cyprus)	163–138	(Ukraine) Dnipro	72–67	91–71
Pizza Express Apollon (Cyprus)	127–151	(Russia) CSK VVS-Samara	77–75	50–76

== Finals ==
Team 1	Agg.	Team 2	1st leg	2nd leg
Keravnos (Cyprus)	166–184	(Russia) CSK VVS-Samara	85–83	81–101

2006–07 FIBA EuroCup Challenge

CSK VVS-Samara
1st title

== Individual statistics ==
=== Points ===
Rank	Player	Team	Total	PPG
1	(United States) LeVar Seals	(Romania) U-Mobitelco Cluj-Napoca	183	22.9
2	(Denmark) Thomas Soltau	(Iceland) Keflavík	136	22.6
3	(Russia) Nikita Shabalkin	(Russia) CSK VVS-Samara	270	22.5
4	(United States) Jeb Ivey	(Iceland) Njarðvík	127	21.2
5	(Iceland) Friðrik Stefánsson	(Iceland) Njarðvík	549	16.1

=== Rebounds ===
Rank	Player	Team	Total	RPG
1	(United States) Erryol Bing	(Switzerland) Boncourt	78	13.0
2	(United States) Jonathan Oden	(Cyprus) Pizza Express Apollon	100	10.0
3	(Iceland) Friðrik Stefánsson	(Iceland) Njarðvík	60	10.0
4	(Lithuania) Donatas Zavackas	(Ukraine) Dnipro	96	9.6
5	(Czech Republic) Petr Benda	(Czech Republic) A plus OHL ŽS Brno	549	16.1

=== Assists ===
Rank	Player	Team	Total	APG
1	(United States) Omar Cook	(Russia) CSK VVS Samara	80	6.7
2	(Croatia) Ivan Tomeljak	(Cyprus) Pizza Express Apollon	49	4.9
3	(Georgia (country)) George Tsintsadze	(Estonia) Tartu ÜSK Rock	29	4.8
4	(Estonia) Tanel Tein	(Estonia) Tartu ÜSK Rock	26	4.3
5	(Czech Republic) Stepán Vrubl	(Czech Republic) A plus OHL ŽS Brno	25	4.2
