= BC Samara =

- Leagues: VTB United League
- Founded: 1976; 50 years ago
- History: List: BC Azot Tolyatti (1976–1977) BC Stroitel Kuybyshev (1977–1991) BC Stroitel Samara (1991–1994) BC Samara (1994–2002) CSK VVS-Samara (2002–2010) BC Samara SGEU (2012–2014) BC Samara (2014–present)
- Arena: Ice Sports Palace
- Capacity: 4,713
- Location: Samara, Russia
- Team colors: Blue, Orange
- President: Kamo Poghosyan
- Head coach: Milos Pavicevic
- Championships: 1 FIBA EuroCup Challenge; 1 Russian Cup
- Website: bcsamara.com
Home	Away

BC Samara (Russian: БК Самара) is a Russian professional basketball team based in Samara.

== History ==
=== BC Samara (1976–2002) ===
Club was founded in Tolyatti as BC Azot.

=== CSK VVS (1992–2002) ===
Another club from Samara was formally patronized by the Russian Air Force (VVS). After the collapse of Soviet Union, staff of basketball club SKA Alma-Ata and basketball players along with coach moved to Samara and new club "CSK VVS" was founded.

In 1997, after bankruptcy, club was moved to Tula, Russia and founded as Arsenal Tula.

=== CSK VVS - Samara (2002–2010) ===
In 2002, CSK VVS was refounded and merged with BC Samara, to form a new club called "CSK VVS - Samara". In the 2006–07 season, this club won the championship of the European-wide 4th tier-level league, the FIBA EuroCup.

However, CSK VVS- Samara went bankrupt in 2009. Thus the team could not participate in the 2009–10 Russian Super League 1 season.

=== BC Samara (2012–present) ===
In 2012, CSK VVS - Samara was refounded as "Samara SGEU" and in 2014 club got back its old name "Samara". BC Samara won Russian Super League 1 twice in season. In 2022 BC Samara joined VTB United League.

== Honours ==
- FIBA EuroCup Challenge

Champions (1): 2006–07

- Russian Basketball Super League

Champions (2): 2018–19, 2020-21

- Russian Cup

Champions (2): 2019–20, 2021-22

== Logos ==
Logo (until 2019)

Logo (2019–present)

== Players ==
=== Current roster ===
BC Samara roster
Players
Coaches

Pos.	No.	Nat.	Name	Ht.	Age
PG	1	(Russia)	Chevarenkov, Artem	1.85 m (6 ft 1 in)	30 – 12 March 1996
PG	3	(Russia)	Kuznetcov, Alexandr	1.85 m (6 ft 1 in)	28 – 13 March 1998
G	4	(Russia)	Sheiko, Gleb	1.98 m (6 ft 6 in)	29 – 19 November 1996
F	10	(Russia)	Mikhailovskii, Nikita	2.01 m (6 ft 7 in)	26 – 10 September 2000
F	12	(Russia)	Savrasov, Andrey	2.01 m (6 ft 7 in)	25 – 30 November 2000
C	14	(Russia) (Ukraine)	Minchenko, Evgeny	2.13 m (7 ft 0 in)	31 – 13 December 1994
F	16	(Russia)	Pokhodiaev, Danila	2.04 m (6 ft 8 in)	25 – 4 February 2001
C	18	(Russia)	Kalinov, Valeriy	2.13 m (7 ft 0 in)	27 – 1 August 1999
G	23	(Russia)	Kulagin, Mikhail	1.91 m (6 ft 3 in)	32 – 4 August 1994
C	27	(Russia)	Kosyakov, Nikita	2.06 m (6 ft 9 in)	21 – 17 January 2005
SF	30	(Russia)	Chikarev, Danila	1.97 m (6 ft 6 in)	24 – 18 November 2001
G	53	(Russia)	Cheburkin, Dmitriy	2.00 m (6 ft 7 in)	29 – 16 June 1997

Head coach

- (Russia) Vladislav Konovalov

Assistant coach(es)

- (Russia) Igor Grachev
- (Russia) Ilya Loktionov
- (Russia) Dmitry Bazarevich

Legend

- (C) Team captain
- Injured

- Roster
Updated: December 20, 2025

Note: Flags indicate national team eligibility at FIBA-sanctioned events. Players may hold other non-FIBA nationalities not displayed.

== Notable players ==
Note: Flags indicate national team eligibility at FIBA-sanctioned events. Players may hold other non-FIBA nationalities not displayed.

Criteria

To appear in this section a player must have either:

- Set a club record or won an individual award while at the club
- Played at least one official international match for their national team at any time
- Played at least one official NBA match at any time.

- (Russia) Sergei Chikalkin (1996–98, 2008–10)
- (Serbia) Milan Preković (2001–02)
- (Serbia) Aleksandar Čubrilo (2001–02)
- (United States) Joe Wylie (2001–02)
- (Georgia (country)) Giorgi Tsintsadze (2004–05)
- (United States) James Wade (2004)
- (United States) Omar Cook (2006–07)
- (United States) Kelvin Gibbs (2006–07)
- (Greece) Georgios Diamantopoulos (2006–07)
- (Russia) Nikita Shabalkin (2006–07)
- (United States) Sam Clancy, Jr. (2008–09)
- (United Kingdom) Andrew Sullivan (2008–09)
- (Nigeria) Ikechukwu Nwamu (2021)
- (United States) Malcolm Thomas (2022–present)

== Head coaches ==
- (Russia) Sergei Bazarevich (2005–06, 2022–present)
- (Russia) Valeri Tikhonenko (2005–09)
