= 2003–04 FIBA Europe Cup =

- Season: 2003–04
- Dates: 5 November 2003–28 March 2004
- Teams: 41

Finals
- Champions: (Germany) Mitteldeutscher (1st title)
- Runners-up: (France) JDA Dijon
- Third place: (Turkey) Tuborg Pilsener
- Fourth place: (Russia) Dynamo Moscow Region
- Final Four MVP: (Lithuania) Marijonas Petravičius

Statistical leaders
Points	(United States) Albert Mouring	26.8
Rebounds	(United States) Alex Jensen	11.8
Assists	(Senegal) Babacar Cisse	7.4

The 2003–04 FIBA Europe Cup was the second season of the FIBA Europe Cup. After its first season as FIBA's revived' Champions Cup the competition was renamed and now considered Europe's fourth level professional club basketball tournament. However it kept the previous competition system dividing the teams in conferences and the three top teams would now automatically qualify to FIBA Europe League 's following season.

The season started on 5 November 2003, and ended on 28 March 2004. A total number of 41 teams participated in the competition.

== Teams ==
- 1st, 2nd, etc.: League position after Playoffs

West conference
(Portugal) Oliveirense (2nd)	(Portugal) Ovarense Aerosoles (3rd)	(Portugal) CA Queluz Sintra (5th)	(Portugal) CAB Madeira (10th)
(France) JDA Dijon (9th)	(France) JA Vichy Auvergne (11th)	(France) Hyères-Toulon (12th)	(Iceland) Keflavík (1st)
East conference
(Russia) EvrAz (5th)	(Russia) Avtodor Saratov (6th)	(Russia) Arsenal Tula	(Russia) Dynamo Moscow Region
(Estonia) Tartu USK Rock	(Estonia) TTÜ/A. Le Coq	(Lithuania) Neptūnas	(Lithuania) Šiauliai
(Ukraine) Khimik	(Ukraine) Sumykhimprom Sumy	(Azerbaijan) Gala Baku	(Latvia) Valmiera/Rujiena
Central conference
(Czech Republic) BVV ŽS Brno	(Czech Republic) Mlékárna Kunín	(Germany) Mitteldeutscher	(Germany) TSK Würzburg
(Hungary) Debreceni Vadkakasok	(Hungary) Kaposvári	(Switzerland) Boncourt	(Switzerland) Benetton Fribourg Olympic
(Croatia) Hiron Botinec			
South conference
(Cyprus) APOEL	(Cyprus) Pizza Express Apollon Limassol	(Cyprus) ENAD Ayiou Dometiou	(Cyprus) Keravnos KEO
(Turkey) Tuborg Pilsener	(Turkey) Fenerbahçe	(Turkey) Tekelspor	(Romania) Asesoft Ploiești
(Romania) Dinamo București	(Romania) West Petrom Arad	(Israel) Hapoel Galil Elyon	(North Macedonia) Fersped Rabotnički

== Conference West ==
=== Qualifying round ===
==== Group A ====
Pos	Team	Pld	W	L	PF	PA	PD	Pts	Qualification
1	(Portugal) Atlético Queluz	6	4	2	512	472	+40	10	Advance to conference play-offs
2	(France) JDA Dijon	6	3	3	514	502	+12	9	Advance to conference play-offs
3	(France) JA Vichy	6	3	3	503	540	−37	9	Advance to conference play-offs
4	(Portugal) Oliveirense	6	2	4	509	524	−15	8	Advance to conference play-offs

Source: FIBA EuroCup

==== Group B ====
Pos	Team	Pld	W	L	PF	PA	PD	Pts	Qualification
1	(Portugal) Ovarense Areosoles	6	4	2	518	507	+11	10	Advance to conference play-offs
2	(France) Hyères-Toulon	6	3	3	504	501	+3	9	Advance to conference play-offs
3	(Iceland) Keflavík	6	3	3	585	579	+6	9	Advance to conference play-offs
4	(Portugal) CAB Madeira	6	2	4	514	534	−20	8	Advance to conference play-offs

Source: FIBA EuroCup

==== Play-offs ====
The winner of the play-offs qualified for the FIBA EuroCup Final Four.

Quarterfinals
(Portugal) Atlético Queluz	89	88
(Portugal) CAB Madeira	70	77
(Portugal) Ovarense Areosoles	77	86
(Portugal) Oliveirense	75	69
(France) JDA Dijon	104	106
(Iceland) Keflavík	92	91
(France) Hyères-Toulon	98	74	89
(France) JA Vichy	96	82	83

Semifinals
2 March – Toulon
(Portugal) Atlético Queluz	77
(Portugal) Ovarense Areosoles	76
2 March – Toulon
(France) Hyères-Toulon	77
(France) JDA Dijon	85

Final
3 March – Toulon
(Portugal) Atlético Queluz	115
(France) JDA Dijon	126
Third place
3 March – Toulon
(France) Hyères-Toulon	80
(Portugal) Ovarense Areosoles	74

== Conference East ==
=== Qualifying round ===
==== Group A ====
Pos	Team	Pld	W	L	PF	PA	PD	Pts	Qualification
1	(Azerbaijan) Gala Baku	2	1	1	197	157	+40	3	Advance to conference play-offs
2	(Ukraine) Sumykhimprom Sumy	2	1	1	157	197	−40	3	Advance to conference play-offs

Source: FIBA EuroCup

==== Group B ====
Pos	Team	Pld	W	L	PF	PA	PD	Pts	Qualification
1	(Russia) Dynamo Moscow Region	2	2	0	177	166	+11	4	Advance to conference play-offs
2	(Russia) Arsenal Tula	2	0	2	166	177	−11	2	Advance to conference play-offs

Source: FIBA EuroCup

==== Group C ====
Pos	Team	Pld	W	L	PF	PA	PD	Pts	Qualification
1	(Ukraine) Khimik	6	4	2	518	507	+11	10	Advance to conference play-offs
2	(Lithuania) Neptūnas	6	3	3	504	501	+3	9	Advance to conference play-offs
3	(Estonia) Tartu Rock	6	3	3	585	579	+6	9	
4	(Russia) EvrAz	6	2	4	514	534	−20	8	

Source: FIBA EuroCup

==== Group D ====
Pos	Team	Pld	W	L	PF	PA	PD	Pts	Qualification
1	(Latvia) Valmiera/Rujiena	6	4	2	518	507	+11	10	Advance to conference play-offs
2	(Russia) Avtodor Saratov	6	3	3	504	501	+3	9	Advance to conference play-offs
3	(Lithuania) Šiauliai	6	3	3	585	579	+6	9	
4	(Estonia) TTÜ	6	2	4	514	534	−20	8	

Source: FIBA EuroCup

==== Play-offs ====
The winner of the play-offs qualified for the FIBA EuroCup Final Four.

Quarterfinals
(Latvia) Valmiera	81	102	99
(Azerbaijan) Gala Baku	93	96	88
(Lithuania) Neptūnas	68	78
(Russia) Dynamo Moscow Region	79	83
(Ukraine) Khimik	102	67	75
(Russia) Arsenal Tula	73	86	87
(Russia) Avtodor Saratov	82	97
(Ukraine) Sumykhimprom Sumy	75	87

Semifinals
28 February – Tula
(Latvia) Valmiera	88
(Russia) Dynamo Moscow Region	91
28 February – Tula
(Russia) Arsenal Tula	92
(Russia) Avtodor Saratov	107

Final
29 February – Tula
(Russia) Dynamo Moscow Region	96
(Russia) Avtodor Saratov	88
Third place
29 February – Tula
(Latvia) Valmiera	90
(Russia) Arsenal Tula	110

== Conference Central ==
=== Qualifying round ===
==== Group A ====
Pos	Team	Pld	W	L	PF	PA	PD	Pts	Qualification
1	(Switzerland) Boncourt	4	3	1	334	296	+38	7	Advance to conference play-offs
2	(Czech Republic) BVV ŽS Brno	4	2	2	320	338	−18	6	Advance to conference play-offs
3	(Germany) TSK Würzburg	4	1	3	300	320	−20	5	Advance to conference play-offs

Source: FIBA EuroCup

==== Group B ====
Pos	Team	Pld	W	L	PF	PA	PD	Pts	Qualification
1	(Germany) Mitteldeutscher	4	4	0	344	299	+45	8	Advance to conference play-offs
2	(Hungary) Debreceni Vadkakasok	4	2	2	353	340	+13	6	Advance to conference play-offs
3	(Switzerland) Benetton Olympic	4	0	4	306	364	−58	4	

Source: FIBA EuroCup

==== Group C ====
Pos	Team	Pld	W	L	PF	PA	PD	Pts	Qualification
1	(Hungary) Kaposvári	4	3	1	360	321	+39	7	Advance to conference play-offs
2	(Czech Republic) Mlékárna Kunín	4	2	2	354	352	+2	6	Advance to conference play-offs
3	(Croatia) Hiron Botinec	4	1	3	304	345	−41	5	Advance to conference play-offs

Source: FIBA EuroCup

==== Play-offs ====
The winner of the play-offs qualified for the FIBA EuroCup Final Four.

Quarterfinals
(Croatia) Hiron Botinec	53	67
(Germany) Mitteldeutscher	92	91
(Germany) TSK Würzburg	95	95
(Switzerland) Boncourt	79	83
(Hungary) Kaposvári	83	54	64
(Czech Republic) BVV ŽS Brno	73	65	76
(Czech Republic) Mlékárna Kunín	77	102
(Hungary) Debreceni Vadkakasok	88	110

Semifinals
28 February – Debrecen
(Germany) Mitteldeutscher	107
(Germany) TSK Würzburg	83
28 February – Debrecen
(Hungary) Debreceni Vadkakasok	89
(Czech Republic) BVV ŽS Brno	86

Final
29 February – Debrecen
(Germany) Mitteldeutscher	93
(Hungary) Debreceni Vadkakasok	77
Third place
29 February – Debrecen
(Germany) TSK Würzburg	84
(Czech Republic) BVV ŽS Brno	95

- Final Four MVP: (United States) Wendell Alexis (Mitteldeutscher)

== Conference South ==
=== Qualifying round ===
==== Group A ====
Pos	Team	Pld	W	L	PF	PA	PD	Pts	Qualification
1	(Turkey) Tuborg Pilsener	4	4	0	328	261	+67	8	Advance to conference play-offs
2	(Romania) West Petrom Arad	4	1	3	287	323	−36	5	Advance to conference play-offs
3	(Turkey) Tekelspor	4	1	3	297	328	−31	5	

Source: FIBA EuroCup

==== Group B ====
Pos	Team	Pld	W	L	PF	PA	PD	Pts	Qualification
1	(Turkey) Fenerbahçe	4	3	1	360	295	+65	7	Advance to conference play-offs
2	(North Macedonia) Fersped Rabotnički	4	2	2	277	293	−16	6	Advance to conference play-offs
3	(Romania) Asesoft Ploiești	4	1	3	265	314	−49	5	

Source: FIBA EuroCup

==== Group C ====
Pos	Team	Pld	W	L	PF	PA	PD	Pts	Qualification
1	(Cyprus) APOEL	4	3	1	355	309	+46	7	Advance to conference play-offs
2	(Israel) Hapoel Galil Elyon	4	2	2	321	310	+11	6	Advance to conference play-offs
3	(Cyprus) ENAD Ayiou Dometiou	4	1	3	280	337	−57	5	

Source: FIBA EuroCup

==== Group D ====
Pos	Team	Pld	W	L	PF	PA	PD	Pts	Qualification
1	(Cyprus) Keravnos KEO	4	2	2	339	324	+15	6	Advance to conference play-offs
2	(Cyprus) Pizza Express Apollon Limassol	4	2	2	335	339	−4	6	Advance to conference play-offs
3	(Romania) Dinamo București	4	2	2	323	334	−11	6	

Source: FIBA EuroCup

=== Play-offs ===
The winner of the play-offs qualified for the FIBA EuroCup Final Four.

Quarterfinals
(Cyprus) Pizza Express Apollon Limassol	61	71
(Turkey) Tuborg Pilsener	77	84
(Turkey) Fenerbahçe	99	89	83
(Israel) Hapoel Galil Elyon	58	95	80
(North Macedonia) Fersped Rabotnički	100	81
(Cyprus) APOEL	93	77
(Romania) West Petrom Arad	70	59
(Cyprus) Keravnos KEO	84	75

Semifinals
28 February – İzmir
(Turkey) Tuborg Pilsener	84
(Turkey) Fenerbahçe	67
28 February – İzmir
(North Macedonia) Fersped Rabotnički	92
(Cyprus) Keravnos KEO	75

Final
29 February – İzmir
(Turkey) Tuborg Pilsener	80
(North Macedonia) Fersped Rabotnički	78
Third place
29 February – İzmir
(Turkey) Fenerbahçe	99
(Cyprus) Keravnos KEO	94

== Overall winners ==
- (France) JDA Dijon (West)
- (Russia) Dynamo Moscow Region (East)
- (Germany) Mitteldeutscher BC (Central)
- (Turkey) Tuborg (South)

== Final Four ==
The pan-European Final Four was held in the İzmir Atatürk Sports Hall in İzmir. The semifinals were played on 27 March while the Final and third place game were played on 28 March 2017.

Semifinals; 27 March
(Germany) Mitteldeutscher	95
(Russia) Dynamo Moscow Region	88
(Turkey) Tuborg Pilsener	74
(France) JDA Dijon	76

Final; 28 March
(Germany) Mitteldeutscher	95
(France) JDA Dijon	88
Third place
(Russia) Dynamo Moscow Region	53
(Turkey) Tuborg Pilsener	94

2003–04 FIBA Europe Cup

Mitteldeutscher
1st title

== See also ==
- 2003-04 FIBA Europe League
- 2003-04 ULEB Cup
- 2003-04 Euroleague

== Sources ==
- 2003-04 at Eurobasket.com
- Linguasport^{[usurped]}
