= BC Arsenal Tula =

Arsenal Tula
- Leagues: Super League 2
- Founded: 1997; 28 years ago
- History: BK Arsenal (1997–present)
- Arena: Arena Sports Hall
- Capacity: 2,500
- Location: Tula, Russia
Home	Away

BC Arsenal Tula (Russian: бк Арсенал Тула) is a basketball club based in Tula, Russia. The club currently plays in the Russian Super League 2, the third tier in Russia.

== History ==
The club was founded in 1997 as BK Arsenal and used the licence of CSK VSS Samara. In its debut season, the club ended in third place in the Russian Super League A.

The club was also in financial trouble in all its Super League years. In the 2004–05 season, Arsenal finally withdrew from the top division.

== Honours ==
- Super League A
  - Third place (1): 1998–99
- Super League B
  - Winners (1): 2000–01

== Notable players ==
Note: Flags indicate national team eligibility at FIBA-sanctioned events. Players may hold other non-FIBA nationalities not displayed.

Criteria

To appear in this section a player must have either:

- Set a club record or won an individual award while at the club
- Played at least one official international match for their national team at any time
- Played at least one official NBA match at any time.

- (Russia) Alexander Petrenko
