= Debreceni Vadkakasok =

- Founded: 1970
- Dissolved: 2007
- Arena: Fönix Hall
- Capacity: 6,500
- Location: Debrecen, Hungary
Home	Away

Debreceni Vadkakasok was a professional basketball team in Debrecen, Hungary. The team participated in the Korać Cup (1997 and 2002) twice and in the ULEB Cup once.
