= 2023–24 Ukrainian Basketball SuperLeague =

Ukrainian Basketball SuperLeague

Ukrainian Basketball SuperLeague
- Season: 2023–24
- Teams: 11

The 2023–24 Ukrainian Basketball SuperLeague (or Favbet Ukrainian Basketball SuperLeague due to sponsorship reasons) is the 2023–24 edition of the Ukrainian top-tier basketball championship. This is the second season that will be played despite the ongoing state of war in Ukraine and will be organised as "bubble" tournaments. Budivelnyk are the defending champions.

This season marked the debut season of BC Rivne.

BC Prometey will not take part in the league for the second consecutive season due to the FBU ban.

== Teams ==
Location of teams in 2023–24 Basketball SuperLeague

The league was expanded to 11 teams, as Rivne made its debut and Kryvbas returned to the league

Team	City	Arena	Capacity
BIPA	Odesa	Palace of Sports	3,500
Budivelnyk	Kyiv	Kyiv Sports Palace	7,000
Cherkaski Mavpy-Dnipro	Cherkasy	Sportpalace Budivelnyk	1,500
Dnipro	Dnipro	Sportcomplex Shynnik	5,600
Kryvbas	Kryvbas	KTU Sports Complex	1,300
Kyiv-Basket	Kyiv	Kyiv Sports Palace	7,000
Politekhnika-Halychyna	Lviv	SP "Halychyna"	
Prykarpattia-Hoverla	Ivano-Frankivsk	College of Physical Education	1,500
Rivne	Rivne		
Stariy Lutsk	Lutsk		
Zaporizhzhia	Zaporizhzhia	Yunost Sport Hall	3,600

== Regular season ==
=== Standings ===
Pos	Team	Pld	W	L	PF	PA	PD	Pts	Qualification
1	Dnipro	27	26	1	2302	1767	+535	53	Qualification for playoffs
2	Rivne	27	19	8	2126	1930	+196	46	Qualification for playoffs
3	Kyiv-Basket	27	16	11	2075	1943	+132	43	Qualification for playoffs
4	Cherkaski Mavpy	27	15	12	2030	1928	+102	42	Qualification for playoffs
5	Zaporizhzhia	27	15	12	2008	1976	+32	42	Qualification for playoffs
6	Prykarpattia-Hoverla	27	14	13	1855	1923	−68	41	Qualification for playoffs
7	Stariy Lutsk	27	11	16	1837	1997	−160	38	Qualification for playoffs
8	Politekhnika-Halychyna	27	9	18	1987	2183	−196	36	Qualification for playoffs
9	BIPA Odesa	27	8	19	1890	2043	−153	35	
10	Kryvbas	27	2	25	1764	2184	−420	29	

Source: Flashscore

== Playoffs ==
Quarterfinals
1	Dnipro	2
8	Politekhnika-Halychyna	0
4	Zaporizhzhia	0
5	Cherkaski Mavpy	2
2	Rivne	2
7	Stariy Lutsk	0
3	Kyiv-Basket	2
6	Prykarpattia-Hoverla	1

Semifinals
1	Dnipro	2
5	Cherkaski Mavpy	1
2	Rivne	2
3	Kyiv-Basket	0

Finals
1	Dnipro	2
2	Rivne	0
Third place
3	Kyiv-Basket	2
5	Cherkaski Mavpy	0

== Ukrainian clubs in European competitions ==
Team	Competition	Progress
Prometey	EuroCup	Quarterfinals
