= USL Most Valuable Player =

The Ukrainian Basketball SuperLeague (USL) Most Valuable Player is an annual award of the Ukrainian Basketball SuperLeague (USL), the highest tier professional basketball league in Ukraine, given since the 2008–09 season, to the league's most valuable player in the regular season.

== Winners ==
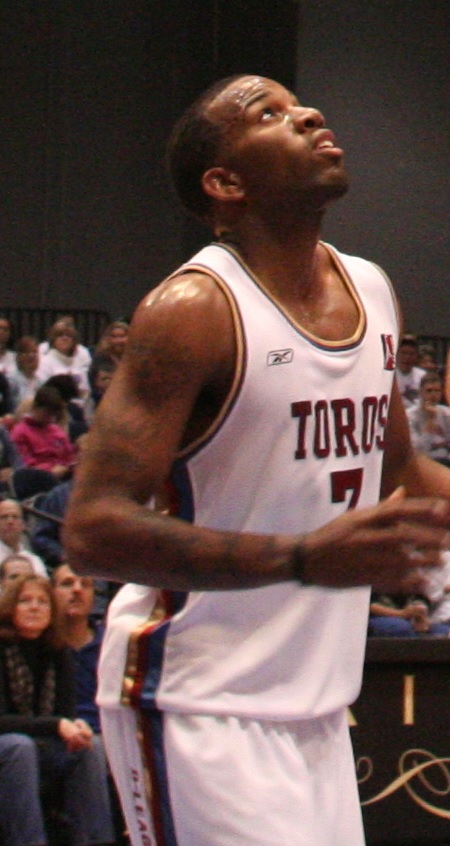
Ramel Curry won the award twice in 2011 and 2012

^	Denotes player who is still active in the SuperLeague
*	Inducted into the Naismith Memorial Basketball Hall of Fame
†	Denotes player whose team won championship that year
Player (X)	Denotes the number of times the player had been named MVP at that time

Season	Player	Position	Nationality	Team	Ref(s)
2008–09	Manuchar Markoishvili	Guard/forward	Georgia	Kyiv	
2009–10	Charles Thomas	Center	United States	Ferro-ZNTU	
2010–11	Ramel Curry	Guard	United States	Azovmash	
2011–12†	Ramel Curry (2)	Guard	United States	Donetsk	
2012–13†	Malcolm Delaney	Guard	United States	Budivelnyk	
2013–14†	Darjuš Lavrinovič	Center	Lithuania	Budivelnyk	
2014–15†	Derek Needham	Guard	United States / Montenegro	Khimik	
2015–16	Dmytro Glebov^	Center	Ukraine	Kryvbas	
2016–17†	Henry Dugat^	Guard	United States	Budivelnyk	
2017–18†	Oleksandr Kolchenko^	Forward	Ukraine	Cherkaski Mavpy	
2018–19†	Deon Edwin^	Guard	U.S. Virgin Islands	Khimik	
2020–21	Mike Caffey^	Guard	United States	Zaporizhya	
2024–25†	Stanislav Tymofeyenko^	Power forward	Ukraine	Dnipro	
2025–26†	Stanislav Tymofeyenko^ (2)	Power forward	Ukraine	Dnipro	

== Players with most awards ==
Player	Awards	Editions
(United States) Ramel Curry	2	2011, 2012
(Ukraine) Stanislav Tymofeyenko	2	2025, 2026
