= Ukrainian Higher League (basketball) =

Second-tier basketball league in Ukraine

Ukrainian Higher League (Vyscha liga/ Вища ліга) is the second-tier basketball competition in Ukraine, after Ukrainian Basketball SuperLeague.

== Current teams (2020-2021) ==
=== Group 1 ===
- Kryvbas
- Mykolaiv 2
- Politekhnik
- Mariupol
- SumDU Sumy
- Dnipro 2
- Prometey 2
- Invasport
- Novomoskovsk

=== Group 2 ===
- Rivne
- VolynBasket
- Zhytomyr
- Khimik 2
- BIPA Odesa SDYUSSOR
- Cherkaski Mavpy 2
- Politekhnika Lviv
- Goverla
