= Deon Edwin =

American basketball player

No. 6 – Anwil Włocławek
- Position: Shooting guard
- League: Polish Basketball League

Personal information
- Born: October 9, 1992 (age 34) Laramie, Wyoming, U.S.
- Listed height: 6 ft 3 in (1.91 m)
- Listed weight: 209 lb (95 kg)

Career information
- High school: Red Lion Christian Academy (Bear, Delaware)
- College: Kent State (2014–2017)
- NBA draft: 2017: undrafted
- Playing career: 2017–present

Career history
- 2017–2018: KTP
- 2018–2019: Khimik
- 2019: Kyiv-Basket
- 2020–2021: Prometey
- 2021–2022: Khimik
- 2022: Rabotnički
- 2022–2023: Paks Atomerőmű
- 2023–2024: DEAC
- 2024–2025: MZT Skopje
- 2025–2026: Paks Atomerőmű
- 2026–present: Anwil Włocławek

Career highlights
- 2× Ukrainian League champion (2019, 2021); Macedonian League champion (2025); Macedonian Cup winner (2025); Ukrainian League All-Star (2019); Ukrainian League MVP (2019); Macedonian League MVP (2025)

Deon Edwin (born October 9, 1992) is a U.S. Virgin Islander professional basketball player for Anwil Włocławek of the Polish Basketball League (PLK). He represents the US Virgin Islands internationally. Standing at 1.91 m (6 ft 3 in), Edwin plays as a point guard or a shooting guard.

== Club career ==
Edwin started his professional career KTP-Basket in the Finnish Korisliiga. He averaged 15.3 points and 6.0 rebounds in 41 games during his rookie season.

In August 2018, Edwin signed with Ukrainian club Khimik of the Ukrainian Basketball SuperLeague. He was an instrumental part in Khimik's run to the 2018–19 Ukrainian SuperLeague title. He averaged 15.8 points per game for Khimik.

On July 29, 2019, Edwin signed with Kyiv-Basket in Ukraine.

For the 2020–21 season, Edwin signed with his third Ukrainian team, Prometey, and won a second Ukrainian Basketball SuperLeague title. Edwin averaged 11.3 points, 6.3 rebounds and 4.3 assists for Prometey.

Edwin rejoined Khimik in 2021 and averaged 12 points, 4.5 rebounds, and 3.3 assists per game. On February 11, 2022, he signed with Rabotnički of the Macedonian League.

== National team career ==
Edwin has been a member of the U.S. Virgin Islands national basketball team and played with the team at 2017 FIBA AmeriCup. He averaged 6.6 points and 4.4 rebounds in five games, helping his country end in the fourth place.
