= Issuf Sanon =

Ukrainian basketball player (born 1999)

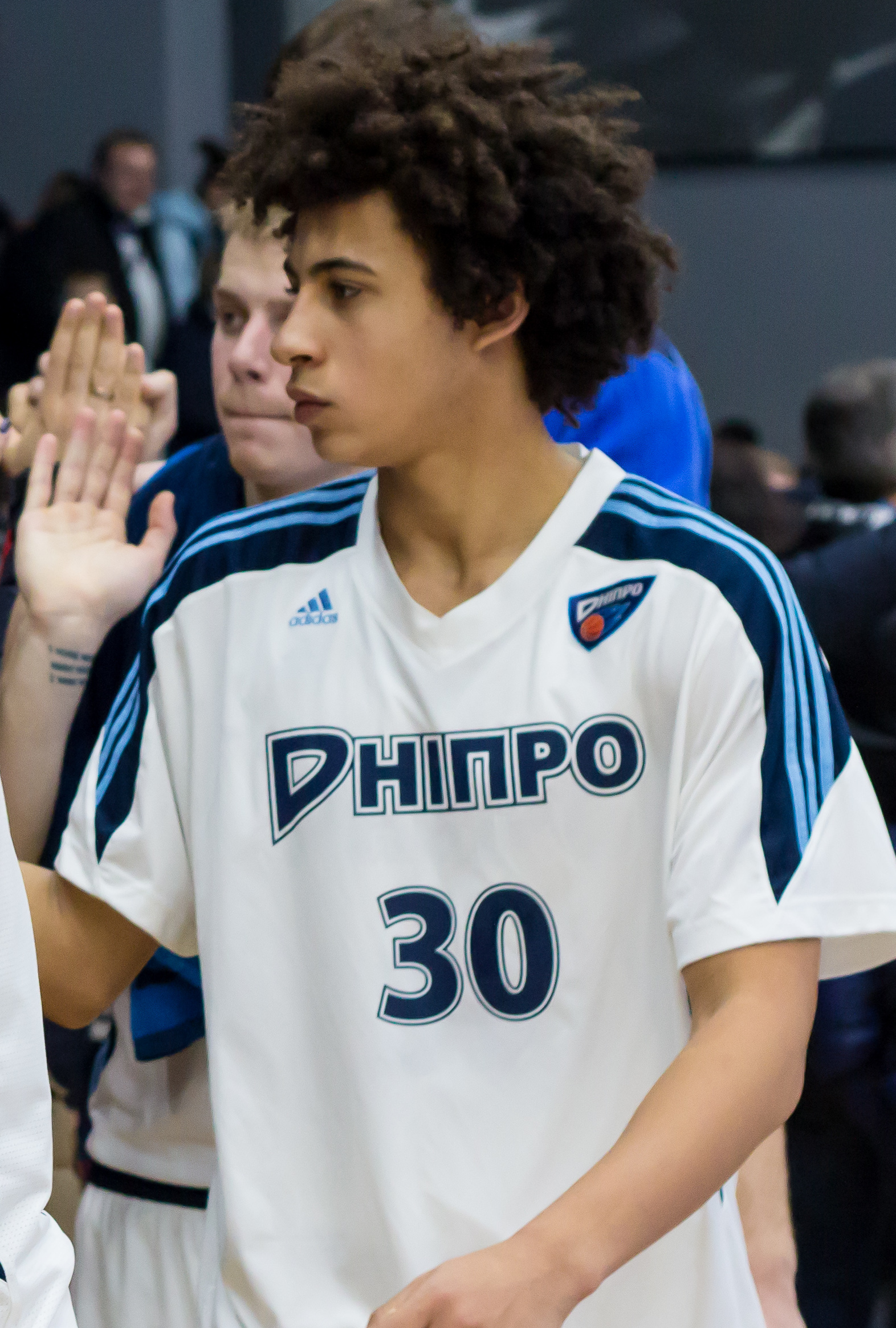
- Sanon in December 2017

No. 30 – VEF Rīga
- Position: Point guard / shooting guard
- League: LBL; LEBL

Personal information
- Born: 30 October 1999 (age 27) Donetsk, Ukraine
- Listed height: 1.93 m (6 ft 4 in)
- Listed weight: 83 kg (183 lb)

Career information
- NBA draft: 2018: 2nd round, 44th overall pick
- Drafted by: Washington Wizards
- Playing career: 2016–present

Career history
- 2016–2018: Dnipro
- 2016–2018: →Dnipro-2
- 2018–2019: Olimpija
- 2019–2022: Dnipro
- 2022: Šiauliai
- 2022–2024: Prometey
- 2024–2025: VEF Rīga
- 2025–2026: Śląsk Wrocław
- 2026–present: VEF Rīga

Career highlights
- LBL champion (2025); 3x Latvian-Estonian League champion (2023–2025); Latvian–Estonian Basketball League MVP (2025); Latvian Cup winner (2025); Latvian Cup Final MVP (2025); Ukrainian Basketball League Best Guard (2021); Ukrainian Basketball League Best Five (2021); Slovenian League champion (2018)
- Stats at Basketball Reference

Issuf Vladlen Sanon (Ukrainian: Іссуф Санон; born 30 October 1999), also spelled Yusuf Sanon, is a Ukrainian professional basketball player for Śląsk Wrocław of the Polish Basketball League (PLK). Standing 1.93 m (6 ft 4 in), the combo guard has experience with the Ukraine under-18 national team. He began his career with the Ukrainian club Dnipro, and was one of the top players on its reserve team.

== Early life ==
Sanon was born and raised in Donetsk, Ukraine. His father, a native of Ouagadougou, Burkina Faso, met Issuf's mother while the two were studying in Ukraine. Sanon began playing basketball at age 7, following his older brother into the sport. In 2014, he competed with the Falcons in the Donetsk School Basketball League, under head coach Anna Kapralova.

== Professional career ==
=== Dnipro (2016–2018) ===
Sanon made his professional debut for Dnipro on 2 October 2016, scoring two points in two minutes against BIPA Odesa, in the top-tier level league in Ukraine, the Ukrainian Basketball SuperLeague. In his first season with the team, he primarily competed for the club's reserve team, Dnipro-2 in the Ukrainian Higher League, the second-tier level professional league in the country. On 17 January 2017 he earned Player of the Week honors from the website Eurobasket.com, after recording a double-double of 22 points and 11 rebounds, in a 14 January game, for Dnipro-2 to defeat Kremen-2. He completed the season for Dnipro-2 averaging 16.8 points, 6.4 rebounds, 3.3 assists, and 3.3 steals per game, in the second division Higher League.

In the 2017–18 season, Sanon saw more playing time for the Dnipro senior team and increased success on the reserve team. His season debut came on 27 September 2017 against Demir İnşaat Büyükçekmece in FIBA Europe Cup's 2017–18 qualification rounds, playing 56 seconds and recording no statistics. On 15 October 2017, with second division Dnipro-2, Sanon recorded 33 points, four rebounds, and eight assists, en route to Eurobasket.com Higher League Player of the Week accolades. He scored a career-high 11 points off the bench, on 1 December 2017, to help defeat Cherkaski Mavpy, in the first division SuperLeague. In his 2017–18 stint with Dnipro, he averaged 2.4 points, 1.2 assists, and 0.8 steals in 9.6 minutes per game, in 13 games played in the Ukrainian top division Super League. In addition, in 5 games played, he averaged a team-best 24.6 points, 4.6 rebounds, 3.8 assists, and 3.4 steals per game, in the Ukrainian second division Higher League.

=== Olimpija (2018–2019) ===
On 13 January 2018 Sanon signed a four-year contract with Petrol Olimpija of the Premier A Slovenian Basketball League (SKL). He debuted for his new team on 21 January 2018, recording only one steal in eight minutes in an ABA League loss to Budućnost Voli Podgorica. On 28 January Sanon scored 11 points and grabbed five rebounds against Šenčur GGD, in a Slovenian SKL game. He notched a career-high 23 points vs. Helios Suns Domžale, in a Slovenian SKL game on 13 February, shooting 4-of-7 from the three-point line. On 27 July 2020 he parted ways with Olimpija.

=== Return to Dnipro (2019–2022) ===
On 22 August 2019, Dnipro announced it had signed Sanon for the 2019–20 season. In July 2020 he re-signed with the team.

=== Šiauliai (2022) ===
On 11 April 2022, Sanon signed with Šiauliai of the Lithuanian Basketball League until the end of the season.

=== Prometey (2022–2024) ===
On 24 June 2022 he signed with Prometey of the Latvian-Estonian Basketball League.

=== VEF Rīga (2024–2025) ===
On 5 July 2024, Sanon signed with VEF Rīga of the Latvian-Estonian Basketball League.

=== Śląsk Wrocław (2025–present) ===
On August 3, 2025, he signed with Śląsk Wrocław of the Polish Basketball League (PLK).

=== NBA draft rights ===
On 4 April 2018 Sanon announced his intentions to enter the 2018 NBA draft, where ESPN projected him to be a "strong draft-and-stash candidate." By the 11 June international deadline, Sanon was one of 11 truly international prospects to remain in the 2018 NBA draft. He was eventually picked by the Washington Wizards (second round, 44th overall). Sanon played for the Wizards during the NBA Summer League, but then returned to Slovenia to develop and gain more experience.

On 6 February 2020 Sanon's draft rights were traded to the New York Knicks. On 27 November 2020 Sanon's draft rights were traded to the Houston Rockets.

== National team career ==
Sanon was unable to compete for the Ukraine under-16 basketball team in 2015, due to an appendix injury. An ankle injury, as well as a lack of official documentation, also prevented him from joining. He made his junior national team debut for Ukraine, at the 2017 FIBA Europe Under-18 Championship, in Slovakia. In seven games played, in a span of just over a week, he averaged 19.3 points, 6.1 rebounds, 2.7 assists, and 3.4 steals per game, leading his team to a 12th-place finish at the tournament. Sanon was named All-European Championships U18 Honorable Mention by the basketball website Eurobasket.com. Entering the event as a little-known prospect, even in his home country, his unexpected success in Slovenia catapulted him into NBA draft consideration. He was subsequently considered a top-10 prospect at the event, according to ESPN.

== Personal life ==
Sanon is a fan of the Denver Nuggets of the National Basketball Association (NBA) and admired Emmanuel Mudiay during his stint with the team. With Olimpija, he takes English classes up to four times each week, watching the show Prison Break to better pick up the language.
