= Maurice Creek =

American basketball player (born 1990)

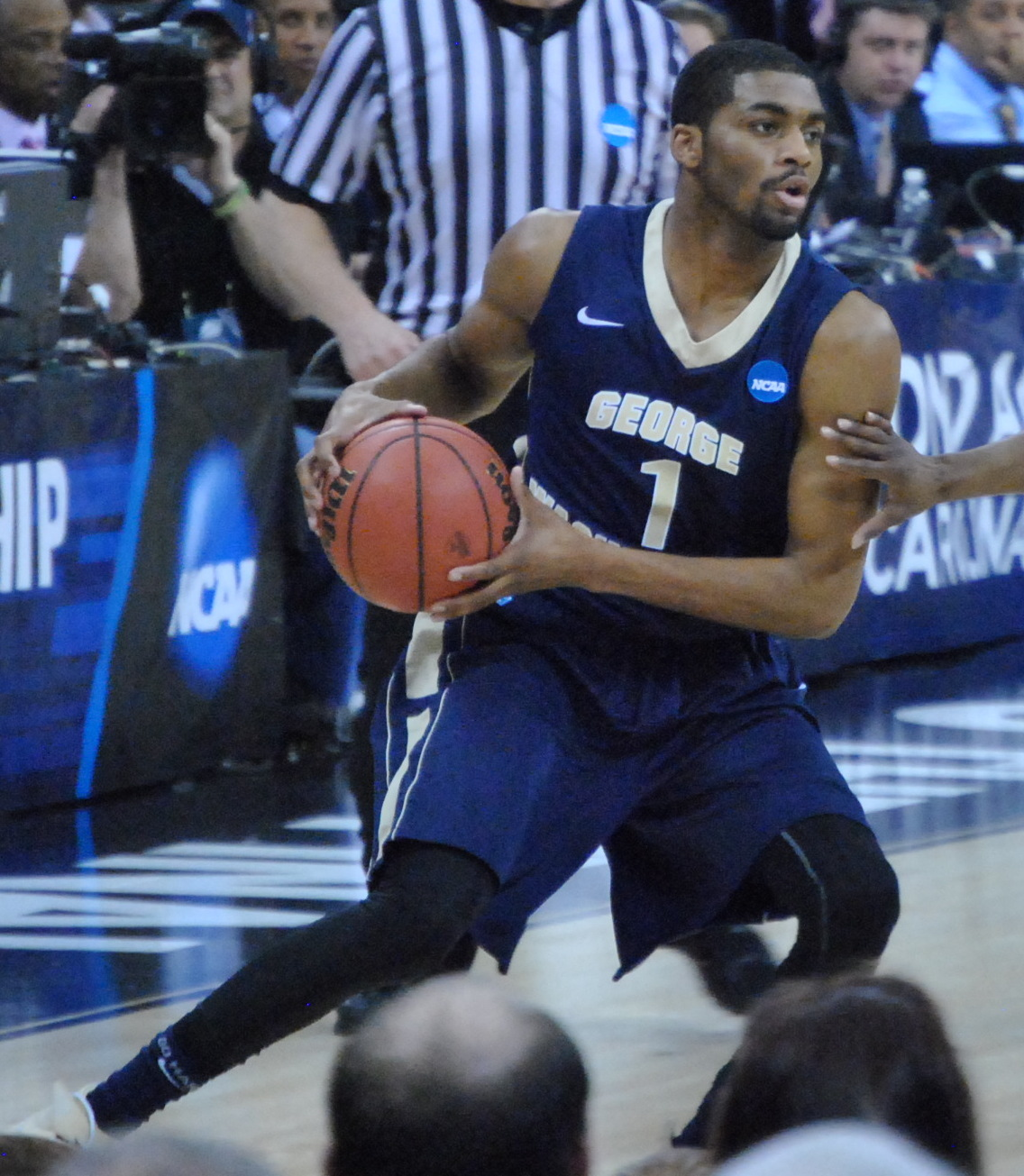
- Creek playing for George Washington in March 2014

Free agent
- Position: Shooting guard

Personal information
- Born: August 16, 1990 (age 36)
- Listed height: 6 ft 5 in (1.96 m)
- Listed weight: 195 lb (88 kg)

Career information
- High school: Hargrave Military Academy (Chatham, Virginia)
- College: Indiana (2009–2013); George Washington (2013–2014)
- NBA draft: 2014: undrafted
- Playing career: 2014–present

Career history
- 2014: Den Helder Kings
- 2015: ZZ Leiden
- 2016: SISU Copenhagen
- 2016–2017: ETB Wohnbau Baskets
- 2017–2018: Kobrat
- 2018–2019: Kyiv-Basket
- 2019: Maccabi Hod HaSharon
- 2019–2020: Prometey Kamianske
- 2020–2021: Steaua București
- 2022: Mykolaiv
- 2023: Olimpia
- 2023: Hamar

Career highlights
- Third-team All-Atlantic 10 (2014)

Maurice Creek (born August 16, 1990) is an American professional basketball player. He played four seasons collegiate for the Indiana Hoosiers and one season for the George Washington Colonials.

== High school ==
Creek was a Kentucky Derby Festival Basketball Classic player before he graduated from Hargrave Military Academy (Chatham, Virginia). He continued his basketball career at Oxon Hill High School and South Kent Prep School. Creek joined the AAU with Triple Threat.

== College career ==
Before playing for Indiana University, Creek wanted to "try to get to the national championship to show everybody that Indiana is alive and is always going to be alive for the rest of the time we live."

"It is really hard to put into context what has happened with him. But the one thing that I can put into context is that he is one tough young man. He embodies the spirit that we want this program to be about. When you look at a situation where, not only has he had one major injury and surgery, not only has he had two major injuries and surgeries, but he has now had three in less than 22 months."

— Coach Tom Crean (October 24, 2011).

An injury limited Creek's playing as a freshman during the 2009–10 season. This reoccurred while as a sophomore during the 2010–11 season. During the early 2010s, he had knee surgery. An achilles tendon rupture prevented Creek from playing in the 2011–12 season.

In June 2013, he transferred to George Washington University for his final year of eligibility, where he became the team's leading scorer and hit a buzzer beater to defeat the Maryland Terrapins. That team reached the NCAA tournament, GW's first in a few years.

=== College statistics ===
Year	Team	GP	GS	MPG	FG%	3P%	FT%	RPG	APG	SPG	BPG	PPG
2009–10	Indiana	12	12	25.4	.527	.448	.763	3.8	1.8	1.4	0.4	16.4
2010–11	Indiana	18	13	20.0	.389	.310	.808	2.4	1.2	0.2	0.2	8.3
2011–12	Indiana	Redshirt injury										
2012–13	Indiana	24	0	7.8	.288	.323	.800	0.9	0.4	0.3	0.1	1.8
2013–14	George Washington	32	30	29.4	.414	.400	.743	3.4	1.8	1.1	0.2	14.1
Career		86	55	20.8	.422	.382	.758	2.5	1.3	0.7	0.2	9.8

== Professional career ==
=== Den Helder Kings (2014) ===
In September 2014, Creek signed with Port of Den Helder Kings of the Dutch DBL. In December, Kings went bankrupt and was dissolved. In his games with Den Helder, he averaged 18.2 points a game, enough for second place in scoring in the DBL.

=== ZZ Leiden (2015) ===
On January 28, 2015, Creek signed with Zorg en Zekerheid Leiden. His season ended when Leiden was defeated 4–2 in the Semi-finals by Donar Groningen.

=== SISU Copenhagen (2016) ===
In January 2016, Creek signed with SISU Copenhagen for the remainder of the 2016–17 season.

=== ETB Wohnbau Baskets (2016–2017) ===
On October 31, Creek was acquired by the Santa Cruz Warriors of the NBA Development League, However, he was waived five days later.

Creek spent the 2016–17 season with ETB Wohnbau Baskets of the ProA.

=== Kobrat (2017–2018) ===
Creek spent the 2017–18 season with Kobrat of the Korisliiga.

=== Kyiv-Basket (2018–2019) ===
Creek played for Sideline Cancer in the 2018 edition of The Basketball Tournament. He scored 19 points and had 8 rebounds in the team's first-round loss to Gael Nation.

On August 15, 2018, Creek signed a one-year contract with Kyiv-Basket of the Ukrainian Basketball SuperLeague.

=== Maccabi Hod HaSharon (2019) ===
On October 24, 2019, Creek signed a one-year deal with Maccabi Hod HaSharon of the Israeli National League, replacing Lee Moore. On November 26, 2019, he parted ways with Hod HaSharon after appearing in two games.

=== Prometey (2019–2020) ===
On December 26, 2019, Creek signed with Prometey Kamianske of the Ukrainian Basketball SuperLeague.

=== Steaua București (2020–2021) ===
Creek re-joined Sideline Cancer for The Basketball Tournament 2020, but they lost in the championship game against the Golden Eagles.

Creek spent the 2020–21 season with CSA Steaua București of the Liga Națională.

=== Mykolaiv (2022) ===
On January 19, 2022, Creek signed with MBC Mykolaiv of the Ukrainian Basketball SuperLeague. Creek was in Ukraine during the 2022 Russian invasion and escaped to Romania and then arrived back in the US after a 24-hour ordeal.

== Iceland (2023) ==
After playing for Olimpia in Uruguay, Creek signed with Hamar in July 2023. He was released by Hamar on 16 November 2023, after appearing in six games where he averaged 18.5 points and 4.1 assists.
