= Oleksandr Kolchenko =

Ukrainian basketball player

No. 3 – Cherkaski Mavpy
- Position: Small forward
- League: USL

Personal information
- Born: September 20, 1988 (age 38) Tiraspol, Moldavian SSR
- Listed height: 6 ft 5 in (1.96 m)
- Listed weight: 211 lb (96 kg)

Career information
- NBA draft: 2010: undrafted
- Playing career: 2005–present

Career history
- 2005–2011: Khimik
- 2011–2013: Azovmash
- 2013–2014: Politekhnika-Halychyna
- 2014–2015: Budivelnyk
- 2015: Avtodor Saratov
- 2015–2016: Nevėžis
- 2016–2020: Cherkaski Mavpy
- 2020–2021: BC Ternopil
- 2021–present: Cherkaski Mavpy

Career highlights
- USL champion (2018); USL Most Valuable Player (2018)

Oleksandr Kolchenko (Ukrainian: Олександр Кольченко; born September 20, 1988) is a Ukrainian basketball player for Cherkaski Mavpy and the Ukrainian national team.

With Ukraine, Kolchenko played at the EuroBasket 2017.
