= 2020–21 Ukrainian Basketball SuperLeague =

Ukrainian Basketball SuperLeague
- Season: 2020–21
- Duration: 7 October 2020 – 14 June 2021
- Teams: 11

Regular season
- Season MVP: (United States) Mike Caffey (Zaporizhzhia)

Finals
- Champions: Prometey; 1st title
- Runners-up: Zaporizhzhia
- Finals MVP: (United States) Rashad Vaughn (Prometey)

Statistical leaders
Points	(United States) Tyrell Nelson	18.3
Rebounds	(United States) Lewis Sullivan	9.7
Assists	(United States) D.J. Cooper	8.2

The 2020–21 Ukrainian Basketball SuperLeague was the 2020–21 edition of the Ukrainian top-tier basketball championship. Dnipro were the defending champions. The season started on 7 October 2020 and ended 14 June 2021.

This season marked the debut season of BC Ternopil. Prometey won its first-ever Ukrainian league title.

== Teams ==
Location of teams in 2019–20 Basketball SuperLeague

The league was expanded to 11 teams, as Ternopil made its debut.

Team	City	Arena	Capacity
Budivelnyk	Kyiv	Kyiv Sports Palace	7,000
Cherkaski Mavpy	Cherkasy	Sportpalace Budivelnyk	1,500
Dnipro	Dnipro	Sportcomplex Shynnik	5,600
Kharkivski Sokoly	Kharkiv	Lokomotyv Sports Palace	4,000
Khimik	Yuzhne	Sportcomplex Olymp	2,000
Kyiv-Basket	Kyiv	Kyiv Sports Palace	7,000
Mykolaiv	Mykolaiv	Sports School Nadiya	2,000
Odesa	Odesa	Palace of Sports	3,500
Prometey	Kamianske	SC "Prometey"	1,000
Ternopil	Ternopil	FOK	500
Zaporizhzhia	Zaporizhzhia	Yunost Sport Hall	3,600

== Regular season ==
=== Standings ===
Pos	Team	Pld	W	L	PF	PA	PD	Pts	Qualification
1	Kyiv-Basket	40	30	10	3388	3017	+371	70	Qualification for playoffs
2	Dnipro	40	28	12	3315	3077	+238	68	Qualification for playoffs
3	Prometey	40	27	13	3444	3099	+345	67	Qualification for playoffs
4	Zaporizhzhia	40	26	14	3234	3071	+163	66	Qualification for playoffs
5	Ternopil	40	24	16	3451	3254	+197	64	Qualification for playoffs
6	Khimik	40	23	17	3077	3053	+24	63	Qualification for playoffs
7	Budivelnyk	40	22	18	3475	3350	+125	62	Qualification for playoffs
8	Cherkaski Mavpy	40	15	25	3035	3200	−165	55	Qualification for playoffs
9	Odesa	40	9	31	3002	3326	−324	49	
10	Kharkivski Sokoly	40	9	31	3023	3559	−536	49	
11	Mykolaiv	40	7	33	3068	3506	−438	47	

Source: Flashscore

== Playoffs ==
Quarterfinals
1	Kyiv-Basket	3
8	Cherkaski Mavpy	0
4	Zaporizhzhia	3
5	Ternopil	0
2	Dnipro	3
7	Budivelnyk	2
3	Prometey	3
6	Khimik	0

Semifinals
1	Kyiv-Basket	2
4	Zaporizhzhia	3
2	Dnipro	1
3	Prometey	3

Finals
4	Zaporizhzhia	0
3	Prometey	3

== Ukrainian clubs in European competitions ==
Team	Competition	Progress
Dnipro	Champions League	First qualifying round
Kyiv-Basket	FIBA Europe Cup	Round of 16
BC Prometey	FIBA Europe Cup	Round of 16
