= D. J. Stephens =

American basketball player (born 1990)

No. 20 – Casademont Zaragoza
- Position: Small forward
- League: Liga ACB

Personal information
- Born: December 19, 1990 (age 35) Frankfurt, Germany
- Listed height: 6 ft 5 in (1.96 m)
- Listed weight: 198 lb (90 kg)

Career information
- High school: Harker Heights (Harker Heights, Texas)
- College: Memphis (2009–2013)
- NBA draft: 2013: undrafted
- Playing career: 2013–present

Career history
- 2013–2014: Ilysiakos
- 2014: Milwaukee Bucks
- 2014: Anadolu Efes
- 2014–2015: Zenit Saint Petersburg
- 2015–2016: Canton Charge
- 2016: Iowa Energy
- 2016–2017: Budivelnyk
- 2017: Vaqueros de Bayamón
- 2017–2018: Le Mans
- 2018: Memphis Grizzlies
- 2018: Memphis Hustle
- 2019: Manama
- 2019: Los Prados De Santo Domingo
- 2019–2020: Le Mans
- 2020–2022: Prometey
- 2022: Fos Provence
- 2022–2023: Prometey
- 2023–2024: Chiba Jets
- 2024–2025: UCAM Murcia
- 2025–present: Casademont Zaragoza

Career highlights
- All-EuroCup First Team (2023); 2× Ukrainian SuperLeague champion (2017, 2021); Ukrainian SuperLeague Best Five (2021); Pro A champion (2018); Pro A Best Sixth Man (2018); C-USA Defensive Player of the Year (2013); Third-team All-C-USA (2013); C-USA All-Defensive Team (2013)
- Stats at NBA.com
- Stats at Basketball Reference

Dalenta Jameral Stephens (born December 19, 1990) is an American professional basketball player for Casademont Zaragoza of the Spanish Liga ACB. He played college basketball for the University of Memphis, where he played four years for the Tigers basketball team.

== College career ==
Stephens was not a highly regarded recruit out of Harker Heights High School when he was offered a scholarship by Memphis coach Josh Pastner. By his senior year at Memphis, however, he had become a crowd favorite for his spectacular dunking and blocking abilities. In 2011–12, he won the Intersport's Dunks of the Year title for a dunk against Xavier on February 4, 2012. In his senior year at Memphis, Stephens became a starter and earned the Conference USA defensive player of the year award. Stephens earned national attention in the 2013 NCAA tournament after demonstrating his leaping ability against St. Mary's and Michigan State.

In a four-year career at Memphis, Stephens played a total of 129 games while averaging 4.0 points, 3.4 rebounds and 1.2 blocks in 13.2 minutes per game.

== Professional career ==
=== Ilysiakos (2013–2014) ===
During the 2013 pre-draft workouts at the NBA Draft Combine, Stephens recorded the highest standing vertical leap (46 inches) and the highest running vertical leap (53 inches) ever recorded by the NBA. He also had the fastest time at the 2013 Combine in the three-quarter court sprint.

After going undrafted in the 2013 NBA draft, Stephens joined the Miami Heat for the Orlando Summer League and the Dallas Mavericks for the Las Vegas Summer League after his shot step in Masaje Arisco. On August 13, 2013, he signed with Ilysiakos B.C. of Greece for the 2013–14 season. In early March 2014, he left Greece and returned to the United States.

=== Milwaukee Bucks (2014) ===
On March 26, 2014, Stephens signed a 10-day contract with the Milwaukee Bucks. On March 29, 2014, he made his NBA debut. In just under 12 minutes of action, he recorded five points and four rebounds in a loss to the Miami Heat. On April 5, 2014, the Bucks did not offer him a second 10-day contract after his first 10-day contract expired.

=== Anadolu Efes (2014) ===
On April 10, 2014, he signed with Anadolu Efes of Turkey for the rest of the 2013–14 season.

=== Zenit Saint Petersburg (2014–2015) ===
On October 1, 2014, Stephens signed with the New Orleans Pelicans. However, he was later waived by the Pelicans on October 24, 2014. On December 2, 2014, he signed with Zenit Saint Petersburg of Russia for the rest of the season. In 21 league games for Zenit in 2014–15, Stephens averaged 6.7 points and 5.3 rebounds per game.

=== Canton Charge (2015–2016) ===
On September 28, 2015, Stephens signed with the Cleveland Cavaliers. However, he was later waived by the Cavaliers on October 23 after appearing in four preseason games.

On October 30, 2015, Stephens was acquired by the Canton Charge of the NBA Development League as an affiliate player of the Cavaliers. On November 14, he made his debut for Canton in a 106–99 loss to the Maine Red Claws, recording 10 points, six rebounds, one assist, one steal and two blocks in 25 minutes. In 27 games for the Charge, he averaged 8.2 points, 4.9 rebounds and 1.3 blocks in 19.8 minutes per game.

=== Iowa Energy (2016) ===
On March 5, 2016, Stephens was traded to the Iowa Energy in exchange for a 2016 fifth-round draft pick. The next day, he made his debut for Iowa in a 109–104 loss to the Delaware 87ers, recording three points and four rebounds in 17 minutes off the bench. On March 28, he was named NBA Development League Performer of the Week after averaging 24.7 points on 61.4 percent shooting to go with 8.0 rebounds, 2.0 blocks, 1.3 assists and 1.3 steals while connecting 11-of-18 three-point attempts in three games from March 21 through March 27.

=== Budivelnyk (2016–2017) ===
In July 2016, Stephens joined the Memphis Grizzlies for the 2016 NBA Summer League and on August 8, 2016, he signed with them. However, he was waived on October 22 after appearing in five preseason games. On November 21, 2016, he signed with Ukrainian club Budivelnyk for the rest of the season. With Budivelnyk he won the Ukrainian SuperLeague championship.

=== Vaqueros de Bayamón (2017) ===
On May 19, 2017, Stephens signed with Vaqueros de Bayamón of the Baloncesto Superior Nacional.

=== Le Mans Sarthe Basket (2017–2018) ===
On July 17, 2017, Stephens signed with French club Le Mans Sarthe Basket for the 2017–18 season. On May 15, 2018, Stephens was named the LNB Pro A Best Sixth Man of the 2017–18 season. He averaged 9.1 points and 3.7 rebounds per game. Stephens re-signed with the team on July 5, 2018.

=== Memphis Grizzlies (2018) ===
On October 8, 2018, Stephens signed a two-way contract with the Memphis Grizzlies, but was waived by the Memphis Grizzlies on December 30, 2018, after appearing in one game.

=== Manama Club (2019) ===
On February 19, 2019, Stephens signed a contract for the rest of the season with the reigning Bahraini Premier League champions, Manama Club. He posted averages of 18 ppg, 10 rpg, and 2.7 assist a game. He announced his departure April 13, 2019, via Instagram.

=== Le Mans Sarthe Basket (2019–2020) ===
On July 12, 2019, he has signed with Le Mans of the LNB Pro A. On December 29, 2019, he has won the dunk contest of the French All-Star Game LNB 2019. He averaged 8.6 points and 3.5 rebounds per game.

=== Prometey (2020–2022) ===
On July 9, 2020, Stephens signed with Prometey of the Ukrainian Basketball SuperLeague. He averaged 12 points, 5.4 rebounds, 1.8 assists, and 1.4 steals per game. Stephens re-signed with the team on July 3, 2021. He averaged 12.4 points, 5.0 rebounds, and 1.3 steals per game, helping the team win the Supercup.

=== Fos Provence (2022) ===
On March 17, 2022, he has signed with Fos Provence of the LNB Pro A.

=== Prometey (2022–2023) ===
On July 28, 2022, he has signed with Prometey of the Latvian-Estonian Basketball League.

=== Chiba Jets (2023–2024) ===
On July 14, 2023, Stephens signed with Chiba Jets of the Japanese B.League.

=== UCAM Murcia (2024–2025) ===
In December 2024, Stephens joined the UCAM Murcia of the Liga ACB.

=== Basket Zaragoza (2025–present) ===
On July 26, 2025, he signed with Casademont Zaragoza of the Spanish Liga ACB.

== NBA career statistics ==
Legend
GP	Games played	GS	Games started	MPG	Minutes per game
FG%	Field goal percentage	3P%	3-point field goal percentage	FT%	Free throw percentage
RPG	Rebounds per game	APG	Assists per game	SPG	Steals per game
BPG	Blocks per game	PPG	Points per game	**Bold**	Career high

=== Regular season ===
Year	Team	GP	GS	MPG	FG%	3P%	FT%	RPG	APG	SPG	BPG	PPG
2013–14	Milwaukee	**3**	0	5.0	.429	–	**1.000**	**1.7**	.0	.0	.0	**2.3**
2018–19	Memphis	1	0	**7.0**	**.500**	–	–	.0	.0	**1.0**	.0	2.0
Career		4	0	5.5	.444	.000	1.000	1.3	.0	.3	.0	2.3

== Personal life ==
Stephens is the son of Will Stephens and Dorothea Love. He’s currently married to Kalis Loyd. He has two daughters, Dallas Stephens, Lordis Stephens, and a newborn son Dante Stephens.
