= Viacheslav Petrov =

Ukrainian basketball player

No. 22 – Kanazawa Samuraiz
- Position: Power forward / center
- League: B.League

Personal information
- Born: 13 August 1994 (age 32) Novomyrhorod, Ukraine
- Listed height: 204 cm (6 ft 8 in)
- Listed weight: 116 kg (256 lb)

Career information
- Playing career: 2014–present

Career history
- 2014–2018: Khimik
- 2018–2020: Kyiv-Basket
- 2020–2023: Prometey
- 2022: Antibes Sharks
- 2023: →Antibes Sharks
- 2024: Podgorica
- 2024–present: Kanazawa Samuraiz

Career highlights
- 2x Ukrainian SuperLeague champion (2015, 2016); Ukrainian Cup champion (2016); Latvian-Estonian League champion (2023)

Viacheslav Petrov (born 13 August 1994) is a Ukrainian professional basketball player for the Kanazawa Samuraiz of the B.League.

== Professional career ==
On 5 March 2022, Prometey of the Ukrainian Basketball SuperLeague were dissolved. On 22 March, Petrov joined the Antibes Sharks of the LNB Pro B.

On 24 June 2022, Prometey joined the Latvian–Estonian Basketball League, Petrov signed with the Prometey for the 2022–23 season. On 2 May 2023, Petrov was loaned to the Antibes Sharks.

On 20 November 2023, Prometey parted ways with Petrov. On 8 January 2024, Petrov joined the Podgorica of the Prva A Liga.

On 6 December 2024, Petrov signed with the Kanazawa Samuraiz of the B.League.

== National team career ==
In 2012, Petrov participated at the 2012 FIBA Europe Under-18 Championship. In 2016, Petrov made his debut for the Ukrainian national basketball team.
