= Joshua Patton =

American basketball player (born 1997)

No. 30 – Falco KC Szombathely
- Position: Center
- League: Hungarian League

Personal information
- Born: March 7, 1997 (age 29)
- Listed height: 6 ft 8 in (2.03 m)
- Listed weight: 230 lb (104 kg)

Career information
- High school: Sierra (Manteca, California)
- College: Sacramento State (2016–2020)
- NBA draft: 2020: undrafted
- Playing career: 2021–present

Career history
- 2021: BIPA Odesa
- 2021–2022: Sporting CP
- 2022: Hapoel Gilboa Galil
- 2022–2023: Sporting CP
- 2023–2024: Bornova Belediyespor
- 2024: AEK Larnaca B.C.
- 2024–2025: Górnik Wałbrzych
- 2026: Soproni KC
- 2026–present: Falco KC Szombathely

Career highlights
- Polish Cup winner (2025); 2× Portuguese League Cup winner (2022, 2023); Portuguese Cup winner (2022); Portuguese Super Cup winner (2021); Higher League champion (2021); Third-team All-Big Sky (2019, 2020)

Joshua Kyle Patton (born March 7, 1997) is an American professional basketball player for Falco KC Szombathely of the Hungarian League. He played college basketball for the Sacramento State Hornets.

== High school career ==
Patton attended Sierra High School in Manteca, California. As a junior, Patton averaged 11.1 points, 9.1 rebounds, and 1.8 blocked shots per game, and shot .620 from the field. He was named Valley Oak League MVP, All-Area MVP, and first team all-VOL defense. As a senior, he averaged 15.3 points, 10.2 rebounds, and 3.3 blocked shots per game and shot.650 from the field. He was named the Stockton Record Player of the Year, league MVP, second team all-NorCal, and first team all-league.

== College career ==
Patton played college basketball for the Sacramento State Hornets. He redshirted the 2015–16 season. In 2016–17, he had 1.1 blocks per game (4th in the Big Sky Conference). In 2017–18, he had 58 blocks and 1.8 blocks per game (both leading the Big Sky), 118 fouls (2nd), a .611 2-point field goal percentage (3rd).

In 2018–19, Patton averaged 6.4 rebounds per game (9th in the Big Sky), 1.6 blocks per game (3rd), and had 51 blocks (3rd), 99 fouls (7th), a .609 2-point field goal percentage (3rd). On November 26, 2019, Patton was named the Big Sky Conference Ready Nutrition Player of the Week. In 2019–20, he had 1.9 blocks per game (2nd), and 57 blocks (again leading the Big Sky), and 108 fouls. In both 2018–19 and 2019–20, Patton was named third-team All-Big Sky. His 391 career fouls are tops in the Big Sky, and his 199 career blocks are 4th.

== Professional career ==
In February 2021, Patton moved to Ukraine to play out the 2020–21 season with BIPA Odesa of the Higher League. He helped the team win the championship. In 24 games, he averaged 16.7 points, 8.5 rebounds, 2.0 assists, 1.3 steals and 2.1 blocks per game.

For the 2021–22 season, Patton joined Sporting CP of the Liga Portuguesa de Basquetebol (LPB). They won the Portuguese Super Cup at the start of the season and then the Portuguese Cup and Portuguese League Cup during the season. In 30 LPB games, he averaged 8.4 points, 4.7 rebounds and 1.2 blocks per game. He also averaged 11.6 points, 5.9 rebounds and 1.1 assists in 14 FIBA Europe Cup games.

In August 2022, Patton signed with Hapoel Gilboa Galil of the Israeli Basketball Premier League. He left Gilboa Galil in November after five games, and in December he returned to Sporting CP for the rest of the 2022–23 LPB season. He helped the team win back-to-back League Cups and helped the team reach the LPB finals, where they lost 3–1 to Benfica. In 30 LPB games, he averaged 9.5 points and 6.0 rebounds per game.

For the 2023–24 season, Patton joined Bornova Belediyespor of the Turkish Basketball First League. In 29 games, he averaged 13.1 points, 7.6 rebounds, 1.4 assists, 1.2 steals and 1.1 blocks per game. In April 2024, he joined AEK Larnaca of the Cypriot Basketball League. In 11 games to complete the season, he averaged 10.3 points and 5.5 rebounds per game.

On August 11, 2024, Patton signed with Górnik Wałbrzych of the Polish Basketball League. In 34 games during the 2024–25 season, he averaged 7.6 points and 4.5 rebounds per game.

In January 2026, Patton joined Soproni KC of the Hungarian League. In 15 games to finish the 2025–26 season, he averaged 18.9 points, 7.3 rebounds, 1.4 assists and 1.2 steals per game.

In July 2026, Patton signed with Falco KC Szombathely for the 2026–27 Hungarian League season.

== Personal life ==
Patton is the son of Gary and Elene Patton. His brother, Jerrod, played a season of college basketball for Fresno State in 2014–15.
