= Ukrainian SL Favorit Sport =

- Sport: Basketball
- Founded: 2015
- Founder: Ukrainian Basketball Federation
- Folded: 2016
- No. of teams: 9
- Country: Ukraine
- Continent: (European Union) FIBA Europe (Europe)
- Last champion: Khimik (1st title)
- Most titles: Khimik (1 title)
- Level on pyramid: 1st tier on Ukrainian pyramid (along with Ukrainian Basketball SuperLeague)
- Domestic cup: Ukrainian Cup

The Ukrainian SL Favorit Sport was one of two top-tier level professional basketball leagues in Ukraine. The league existed for one season, and was organised by the Ukrainian Basketball Federation.

== History ==
At the start of the 2015–16 season, the SL Favorit Sport league was founded, and several teams from the Ukrainian SuperLeague, including the league's champions, Khimik, left the Ukrainian SuperLeague and joined the newly formed Ukrainian SL Favorit Sport league. After the 2015–16 season, the two leagues merged again.

== Teams ==
As of the 2015-2016 season the following team participated:

Team	City
Bipa Odesa	Odesa
Infiz Kyiv	Kyiv
Dynamo Kyiv	Kyiv
Mykolaiv	Mykolaiv
Zaporizhya	Zaporizhia
VolynBasket	Lutsk
Kryvbas	Kryvyi Rih
Cherkaski Mavpy	Cherkaski
Khimik	Yuzhny

== Finals ==
Season	Champions	Score	Runners-up
2015–16	Khimik	3–1	Dynamo Kyiv

== See also ==
- Ukrainian SuperLeague
