= Branden Frazier =

American basketball player (born 1992)

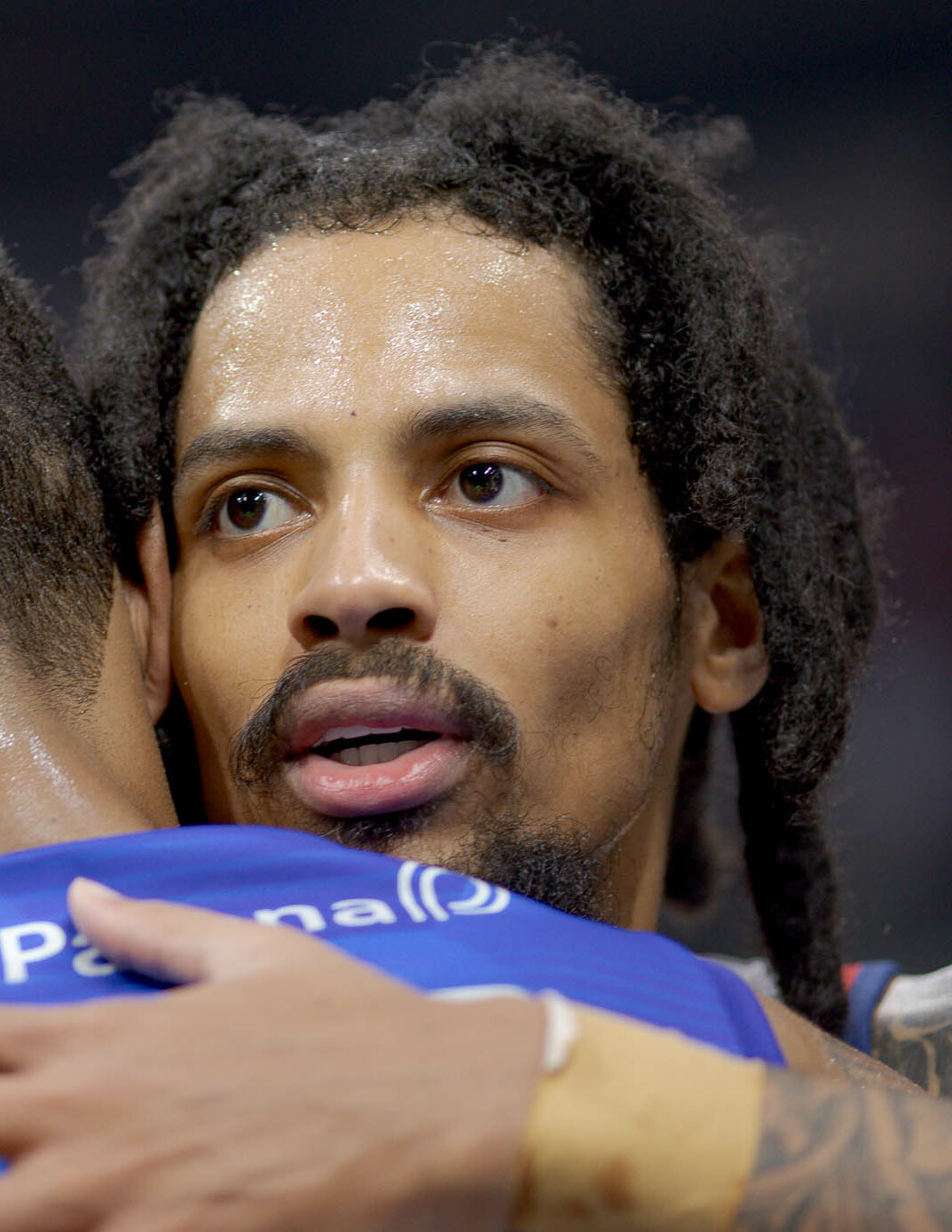
- Frazier with Nacional in 2023

No. 11 – Shandong Honey Badger
- Position: Point guard
- League: National Basketball League

Personal information
- Born: July 23, 1992 (age 34) Brooklyn, New York, U.S.
- Listed height: 1.93 m (6 ft 4 in)
- Listed weight: 81 kg (179 lb)

Career information
- High school: Bishop Loughlin (Brooklyn, New York)
- College: Fordham (2010–2014)
- NBA draft: 2014: undrafted
- Playing career: 2014–present

Career history
- 2014: Den Helder Kings
- 2015: Kaposvári
- 2015–2016: Khimik
- 2016–2018: Avtodor Saratov
- 2018–2019: Burgos
- 2019–2020: Bonn
- 2020–2021: Fethiye Belediyespor
- 2021: Monaco
- 2021: Stelmet Zielona Góra
- 2021–2022: Fortitudo Bologna
- 2022–2023: Libertadores de Querétaro
- 2023: Nacional
- 2023–2024: Real Betis Baloncesto
- 2024: Estudiantes
- 2024–2025: TSG GhostHawks
- 2025: Al Ahly Ly
- 2026–present: Shandong Honey Badger

Career highlights
- Ukrainian League champion (2016); Ukrainian League Finals MVP (2016)

Branden Lee Herbert Frazier (born July 23, 1992) is an American professional basketball player for the Shandong Honey Badger of the National Basketball League (NBL). Frazier usually plays as a point guard. He played college basketball for the Fordham Rams.

== Professional career ==
In September 2014, Frazier signed with Den Helder Kings of the Dutch Basketball League. He played with the team until Den Helder went bankrupt and was expelled from the DBL in December.

In January 2015, Frazier signed with Kaposvári KK of the Hungarian NB I/A. Fraziers made his mark in league instantly by only playing half the season and making Eurobasket 2nd Team All-Hungarian and All import team during his first season.

Frazier played with Khimik in Ukraine in the inaugural 2015–16 SL Favorit Sport season. With Khimik, he won the Favorit Sport championship and was named 1st team All Ukrainian and Finals MVP. Frazier was a key component to Khimik's run in the 2015–16 FIBA Europe Cup and garnered Eurobasket.com All- FIBA EuroCup Player of The Year, Guard of The Year, Import of The Year honors and was named to the FIBA EuroCup 1st Team and FIBA EuroCup All Import Team.

In June 2016, Frazier signed with Avtodor Saratov of the VTB United League. During the 2016–17 season, he averaged 10.1 points, 5 assists, 3 rebounds and 1 steal in 24 VTB games and 11.5 points, 6.5 assists, and 3.3 rebounds in 16 Champions League games. In his second season with the team, Frazier averaged 12.2 points, 3.5 assists, and 2.4 rebounds in 24 VTB games.

On July 25, 2018, Frazier signed with San Pablo Burgos of the Liga ACB.

On July 18, 2019, he has signed with Telekom Baskets Bonn of the Basketball Bundesliga (BBL). He averaged 9.3 points, 2.1 rebounds, 4.3 assists and 1.1 steals per game.

On September 25, 2020, Frazier signed with Lokman Hekim Fethiye Belediyespor of the Turkish BSL.

On February 26, 2021, he has signed with AS Monaco of the French LNB Pro A. Frazier averaged 8.3 points and 2.6 assists per game. On August 10, he signed with Stelmet Zielona Góra of the Polish Basketball League. He parted ways with the team on December 27.

On December 30, 2021, Frazier signed with Fortitudo Bologna in the Italian Lega Basket Serie A.

On August 31, 2024, Frazier signed with TSG GhostHawks of the P. League+.
