= 2018–19 Ukrainian Basketball SuperLeague =

Ukrainian Basketball SuperLeague
- Season: 2018–19
- Duration: 5 October 2018 – May 2019
- Teams: 8

Regular season
- Season MVP: Deon Edwin

Finals
- Champions: Khimik (3rd title)
- Runners-up: Kyiv-Basket
- Third place: Zaporizhzhia
- Fourth place: Dnipro

The 2018–19 Ukrainian Basketball SuperLeague was the 2018–19 edition of the Ukrainian top-tier basketball championship. Cherkaski Mavpy were the defending champions.

Khimik won its third domestic title, its first one since 2016, after beating Kyiv-Basket in the finals. Khimik's Deon Edwin was named the USL Most Valuable Player this season.

== Teams ==
Location of teams in 2018–19 Basketball SuperLeague

Eight teams joined the competition. Budivelnyk and BIPA Odesa were replaced by Kyiv-Basket and Odesa respectively.

On 21 June 2018, the Ukrainian federation announced that Budivelnyk would not participate because of its open debts to its players.

Team	City	Arena
Cherkaski Mavpy	Cherkasy	Sportpalace Budivelnyk
Dnipro	Dnipro	Sportcomplex Shynnik
Khimik	Yuzhne	Sportcomplex Olymp
Kyiv-Basket	Kyiv	Kyiv Sports Palace
Mykolaiv	Mykolaiv	Sports School Nadiya
Odesa	Odesa	Palace of Sports
Politekhnik	Kharkiv	
Zaporizhzhia	Zaporizhzhia	Palace of Sports ZAB

== Regular season ==
=== Standings ===
Pos	Team	Pld	W	L	PF	PA	PD	Pts	Qualification
1	Zaporizhzhia	28	19	9	2488	2387	+101	47	Qualification to playoffs
2	Khimik	28	19	9	2378	2263	+115	47	Qualification to playoffs
3	Dnipro	28	18	10	2272	2186	+86	46	Qualification to playoffs
4	Kyiv-Basket	28	15	13	2262	2177	+85	43	Qualification to playoffs
5	Mykolaiv	28	13	15	2188	2227	−39	41	Qualification to playoffs
6	Odesa	28	10	18	2251	2336	−85	38	Qualification to playoffs
7	Politekhnik	28	9	19	2175	2331	−156	37	Qualification to playoffs
8	Cherkaski Mavpy	28	9	19	2384	2491	−107	37	Qualification to playoffs

Source: Flashscore

=== Results ===
Home \ Away	CHE	ODE	DNI	KHI	KYI	MYK	POL	ZAP	CHE	ODE	DNI	KHI	KYI	MYK	POL	ZAP
Cherkaski Mavpy	—	110–95	89–91	96–98	77–80	101–94	71–89	88–91	—	84–81	89–86	82–86	87–96	74–94	89–91	98–105
Odesa	76–83	—	71–65	89–80	89–79	71–62	74–92	94–97	88–85	—	59–72	78–84	70–76	85–93	82–76	95–88
Dnipro	97–82	90–85	—	78–73	86–93	74–65	70–59	83–79	92–87	90–72	—	74–75	75–65	88–82	83–68	87–83
Khimik	93–76	90–89	94–92	—	89–75	87–81	94–82	87–95	92–89	92–78	75–76	—	72–79	77–83	87–92	74–79
Kyiv-Basket	75–80	84–81	78–79	60–65	—	85–72	77–81	103–82	90–51	76–62	85–77	60–65	—	88–72	75–76	88–83
Mykolaiv	80–73	92–73	78–72	72–88	83–79	—	72–65	60–57	75–83	67–82	73–80	68–80	74–72	—	94–78	79–88
Politekhnik	94–85	76–81	65–73	61–99	68–74	75–77	—	74–95	76–91	69–84	80–73	72–84	86–88	86–81	—	86–90
Zaporizhzhia	90–93	88–80	89–79	97–101	88–82	84–81	104–77	—	96–91	96–87	93–90	93–82	92–83	82–84	84–81	—

Source: Flashscore
Legend: Blue = home team win; Red = away team win.

== Playoffs ==
Quarterfinals will be played in a best-of-three games format, while semifinals and final in a best-of-five (2–2–1) format.

=== Bracket ===
Quarter-finals
Zaporizhzhia	2
Cherkaski Mavpy	1
Kyiv-Basket	2
Mykolaiv	1
Khimik	2
Politekhnik	0
Dnipro	2
Odesa	1

Semi-finals
Zaporizhzhia	1
Kyiv-Basket	3
Khimik	3
Dnipro	2

Final
Kyiv-Basket	0
Khimik	3
Third place
Zaporizhzhia	3
Dnipro	2

=== Quarter-finals ===
Team 1	Series	Team 2	Game 1	Game 2	Game 3
Zaporizhzhia	2–1	Cherkaski Mavpy	105–87	91–101	81–80
Khimik	2–0	Politekhnik	83–81	90–66	
Dnipro	2–1	Odesa	92–82	93–101	91–81
Kyiv-Basket	2–1	Mykolaiv	82–70	94–103	83–73

=== Semi-finals ===
Team 1	Series	Team 2	Game 1	Game 2	Game 3	Game 4	Game 5
Zaporizhzhia	1–3	Kyiv-Basket	86–94	95–83	92–104	81–89	
Khimik	3–2	Dnipro	95–85	92–86	53–90	77–93	76–71

=== Third place series ===
Team 1	Series	Team 2	Game 1	Game 2	Game 3	Game 4	Game 5
Zaporizhzhia	3–2	Dnipro	110–86	73–81	100–94	77–92	76–56

=== Finals ===
Team 1	Series	Team 2	Game 1	Game 2	Game 3	Game 4	Game 5
Khimik	3–0	Kyiv-Basket	88–70	92–87	79–73		

== Ukrainian clubs in European competitions ==
Team	Competition	Progress
Cherkaski Mavpy	FIBA Europe Cup	Regular season
Dnipro	FIBA Europe Cup	Regular season
