= Dmytro Zabirchenko =

Ukrainian basketball player

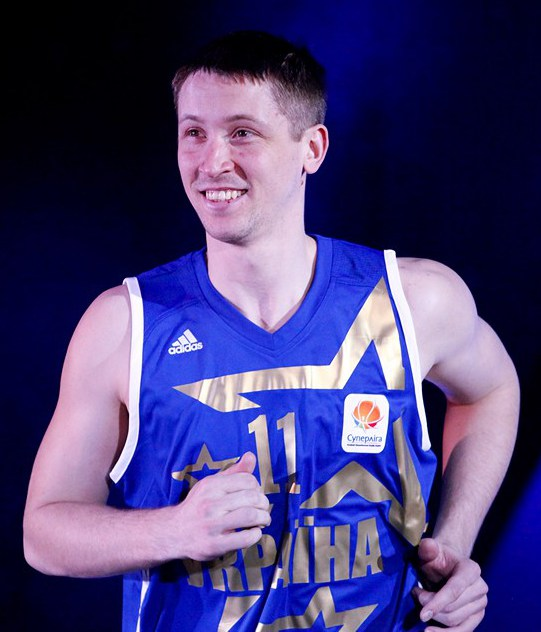
- Zabirchenko in 2012

BC Ternopil
- Title: Head coach
- League: Ukrainian SuperLeague

Personal information
- Born: June 15, 1984 (age 42) Druzhkovka, Ukraine, Soviet Union
- Listed height: 6 ft 3.7 in (1.92 m)
- Listed weight: 193 lb (88 kg)

Career information
- NBA draft: 2006: undrafted
- Playing career: 2001–2017
- Position: Point guard
- Number: 11
- Coaching career: 2020–present

Career history

Playing
- 2001–2005: BC Azovmash
- 2005–2006: SC Mariupol
- 2006–2008: Budivelnyk
- 2008–2009: BC Donetsk
- 2009–2010: BC Kyiv
- 2010–2012: Budivelnyk
- 2012–2014: Azovmash
- 2014–2015: Budivelnyk
- 2015–2016: Kryvbas
- 2016–2017: Sokhumi

Coaching
- 2018–present: Ternopil

Dmytro Oleksandrovych Zabirchenko (Ukrainian: Дмитро Олександрович Забірченко; born 15 June 1984) s a Ukrainian retired basketball player and current coach.

Zabirchenko played with the Ukraine national basketball team at the FIBA EuroBasket 2011 and FIBA EuroBasket 2013.

== Coaching career ==
Starting from 2018, Zabrichenko is the head coach of BC Ternopil which made its debut in the Ukrainian Basketball SuperLeague in 2020–21.
