= Oleksandr Lypovyy =

Ukrainian basketball player (born 1991)

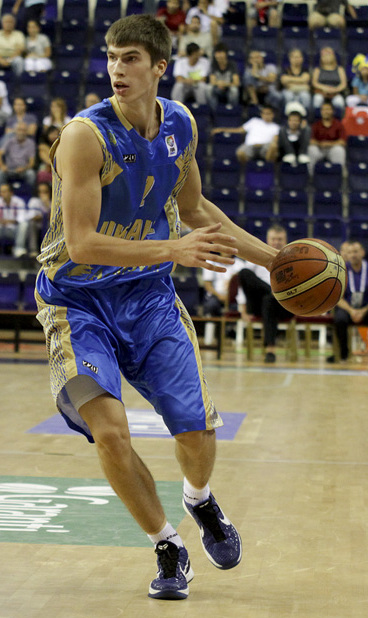
- Lypovyy, while playing with the Ukraine, in August 2011.

Free agent
- Position: Small forward / shooting guard

Personal information
- Born: October 9, 1991 (age 35) Kharkiv, Ukrainian SSR, Soviet Union
- Listed height: 2.03 m (6 ft 8 in)
- Listed weight: 91 kg (201 lb)

Career information
- NBA draft: 2013: undrafted
- Playing career: 2008–present

Career history
- 2008–2011: Kyiv
- 2011–2014: Donetsk
- 2014: Crvena zvezda
- 2014–2015: Budivelnyk
- 2015: VITA Tbilisi
- 2015–2016: Szolnoki Olaj
- 2016: Dynamo Kyiv
- 2016–2017: Aries Trikala
- 2017–2020: Promitheas Patras
- 2020–2022: Prometey
- 2022: Telekom Baskets Bonn
- 2022–2024: Prometey
- 2024: Alicante
- 2024–2025: Kolossos Rodou

Career highlights
- Ukrainian League champion (2012); Ukrainian Cup winner (2015)

Oleksandr Lypovyy (born October 9, 1991) is a Ukrainian professional basketball player who last played for Kolossos Rodou of the Greek Basketball League.

== Professional career ==
In March 2014, Lypovyy signed a contract with the Serbian team Crvena zvezda, for the rest of the season. In September 2014, he returned to Ukraine, and signed with Budivelnyk. In October 2015, he signed with the Georgian team VITA Tbilisi.

On November 10, 2015, he left Tbilisi and signed with the Hungarian club Szolnoki Olaj, for the rest of the season. In late February 2016, he left Szolnoki and signed with the Ukrainian club Dynamo Kyiv, for the rest of the season. In September 2016, he signed with the Greek team Aries Trikala, for the 2016–17 season.

On July 14, 2017, he signed with the Greek club Promitheas Patras. On July 4, 2019, Lypovyy renewed his contract with Promitheas through 2021. After the end of the 2019–20 season, Lypovyy refused to reduce his wages with Promitheas, and eventually, the team terminated his contract.

Lypovyy spent the next four seasons with his home country club Prometey, along with a brief stint with the German team Telekom Baskets Bonn in 2022.

After starting the 2024–25 campaign with Alicante in Spain, Lypovyy returned to Greece for Kolossos Rodou, reuniting with his Promitheas Patras coach Makis Giatras.

== National team career ==
Lypovyy has been a member of the senior Ukrainian national basketball team. With the Ukrainian national team, he played at the EuroBasket 2011, the EuroBasket 2013, the EuroBasket 2015, and the EuroBasket 2017. He also played at the 2014 FIBA World Cup

== See also ==
- List of foreign basketball players in Serbia
