= Dmytro Skapintsev =

Ukrainian basketball player (born 1998)

No. 44 – Básquet Coruña
- Position: Center / power forward
- League: Liga ACB

Personal information
- Born: 12 May 1998 (age 28) Cherkasy, Ukraine
- Listed height: 7 ft 1 in (2.16 m)
- Listed weight: 215 lb (98 kg)

Career information
- NBA draft: 2020: undrafted
- Playing career: 2015–present

Career history
- 2015–2021: Cherkaski Mavpy
- 2021–2022: Kyiv-Basket
- 2022: Pieno žvaigždės
- 2022–2024: Westchester Knicks
- 2023–2024: New York Knicks
- 2024–2025: Maine Celtics
- 2025: Rip City Remix
- 2025–2026: Hapoel Jerusalem
- 2026–present: Básquet Coruña

Career highlights
- NBA G League Showcase Cup champion (2023)
- Stats at NBA.com
- Stats at Basketball Reference

Dmytro Skapintsev (born 12 May 1998) is a Ukrainian professional basketball center and power forward for Básquet Coruña of the Liga ACB.

== Professional career ==
=== Early career (2015–22) ===
Skapintsev's professional career began with his hometown team, Cherkaski Mavpy in Cherkasy, Ukraine, with whom he played for six years. In 2019, he joined the Cal State Northridge Matadors. He spent a few months with the team, but never appeared in a game.

In 2021, Skapintsev moved to Kyiv-Basket in Ukraine; he remained with the team through the beginning of 2022. After the Russian invasion of Ukraine shut down the Ukrainian Basketball SuperLeague season, Skapintsev played out the rest of the year with Pieno žvaigždės, in Pasvalys, Lithuania.

=== New York / Westchester Knicks (2022–24) ===
On 23 October 2022, Skapintsev signed with the Westchester Knicks, playing out the 2022–23 season with the team.

In July 2023, Skapintsev joined the New York Knicks for the 2023 NBA Summer League, and on 3 August, he signed with New York. However, he was waived on 15 September and on 9 November, he was named to the Westchester Knicks opening night roster.

On 23 December 2023, Skapintsev signed a two-way contract with the New York Knicks, and he made his NBA debut that night in a 130–111 loss to the Milwaukee Bucks. However, he was waived on 1 January 2024, and two days later, he rejoined Westchester.

=== Maine Celtics (2024–25) ===
On 17 September 2024, Skapintsev signed with the Boston Celtics, but he was waived on 16 October./ On 26 October, he joined the Maine Celtics. He played sparingly for the Celtics, appearing in only five games and averaging 3.2 points per game.

=== Rip City Remix (2025) ===
On 17 January 2025, Skapintsev was traded to the Rip City Remix. In 26 games for the team, Skapintsev averaged 10.1 points and 8.2 rebounds.

=== Hapoel Jerusalem (2025–2026) ===
On 7 August 2025, Skapintsev signed a one-year contract with Hapoel Jerusalem of the Israeli Basketball Premier League and the EuroCup. In 2026-26 in 34 games in 13.8 minutes per game he averaged 5.1 points, 4.5 rebounds, and 0.7 blocks while shooting 64.9% from the field.

=== Básquet Coruña (2026–present) ===
On 25 July 2026, he signed with Básquet Coruña of the Liga ACB.

== National team career ==
Skapintsev was included on Ukraine's 2022 EuroBasket roster. He played in two of Ukraine's five group stage games, and did not play in their Round of 16 loss to Poland.

== Career statistics ==
Legend
GP	Games played	GS	Games started	MPG	Minutes per game
FG%	Field goal percentage	3P%	3-point field goal percentage	FT%	Free throw percentage
RPG	Rebounds per game	APG	Assists per game	SPG	Steals per game
BPG	Blocks per game	PPG	Points per game	**Bold**	Career high

=== NBA ===
Year	Team	GP	GS	MPG	FG%	3P%	FT%	RPG	APG	SPG	BPG	PPG
2023–24	New York	2	0	1.1	.000	–	–	.0	.0	.0	.0	.0
Career		2	0	1.1	.000	–	–	.0	.0	.0	.0	.0
