= 2019–20 FIBA Europe Cup Play-offs =

The 2019–20 FIBA Europe Cup play-offs began on 4 March and would have concluded on 29 April 2020 with the 2020 FIBA Europe Cup Finals, to decide the champions of the 2019–20 FIBA Europe Cup. A total of eight teams were to compete in the play-offs.

On 16 June 2020, FIBA Europe announced the season was declared void and would not be finished.

== Format ==
Each tie in the knockout phase, is played over two legs, with each team playing one leg at home.

The draw was made with the only restriction that these lucky losers could not be paired against each other, being decided all the bracket by the luck of the draw in the round of 16.

== Qualified teams ==
The four group winners and second-placed teams from the second round advanced to the play-offs. Since this season, there were not transfer from the Champions League.

Group	Winners	Runners-up
I	(Germany) medi Bayreuth	(Denmark) Bakken Bears
J	(Belarus) Tsmoki Minsk	(Romania) U-BT Cluj-Napoca
K	(Latvia) Ventspils	(Ukraine) Kyiv Basket
L	(Turkey) Pınar Karşıyaka	(Turkey) Bahçeşehir Koleji

=== Standings ===
Pos	Grp	Team	Pld	W	L	PF	PA	PD
1	L	(Turkey) Pınar Karşıyaka	6	6	0	594	421	+173
2	K	(Latvia) Ventspils	6	5	1	558	479	+79
3	I	(Germany) medi Bayreuth	6	5	1	581	526	+55
4	J	(Belarus) Tsmoki-Minsk	6	4	2	481	446	+35
5	I	(Denmark) Bakken Bears	6	4	2	542	527	+15
6	J	(Romania) U-BT Cluj-Napoca	6	4	2	474	460	+14
7	K	(Ukraine) Kyiv Basket	6	4	2	481	484	−3
8	L	(Turkey) Bahçeşehir Koleji	6	3	3	508	554	−46

Source: FIBA Europe Cup

== Bracket ==
Quarter-finals
(Turkey) Bahçeşehir Koleji	78	112	190
(Latvia) Ventspils	77	90	167
(Denmark) Bakken Bears	79	93	172
(Belarus) Tsmoki Minsk	66	87	153
(Romania) U-BT Cluj-Napoca	83	87	170
(Germany) medi Bayreuth	82	100	182
(Ukraine) Kyiv Basket	71	67	138
(Turkey) Pınar Karşıyaka	89	88	177

Semi-finals (Cancelled)
Cancelled
(Turkey) Bahçeşehir Koleji
(Denmark) Bakken Bears
Cancelled
(Germany) medi Bayreuth
(Turkey) Pınar Karşıyaka

Final (Cancelled)
Cancelled
–
–

== Quarterfinals ==
The first legs were played on 4 March, and the second legs were played on 11 March 2020. Team 2 played the second leg at home.

Team 1	Agg.	Team 2	1st leg	2nd leg
U-BT Cluj-Napoca (Romania)	170–182	(Germany) medi Bayreuth	83–82	87–100
Bakken Bears (Denmark)	172–153	(Belarus) Tsmoki Minsk	79–66	93–87
Bahçeşehir Koleji (Turkey)	190–167	(Latvia) Ventspils	78–77	112–90
Kyiv Basket (Ukraine)	138–177	(Turkey) Pınar Karşıyaka	71–89	67–88

=== First leg ===
4 March 2020	Bahçeşehir Koleji (Turkey)	78–77	(Latvia) Ventspils	Istanbul
17:00	Scoring by quarter: 15–22, 21–24, 22–16, 20–15
	Pts: Clark 24; Rebs: Mathiang 15; Asts: Golden 9 Eff: Clark 26	Boxscore	Pts: Kaufmanis 18; Rebs: Luther 7 Asts: Shorts 9 Eff: Shorts 24	Arena: BJK Akatlar Arena; Referees: Luis Castillo (ESP), Ventsislav Velikov (BUL), Sergei Beliakov (RUS)

4 March 2020	U-BT Cluj-Napoca (Romania)	83–82	(Germany) medi Bayreuth	Cluj-Napoca
18:00	Scoring by quarter: 25–25, 23–14, 17–19, 18–24
	Pts: Peak 19; Rebs: Richard 7 Asts: Richard 6 Eff: Richard 23	Boxscore	Pts: Doreth 19; Rebs: Bruinsma, Travis 8 Asts: Robinson 6 Eff: Doreth 21	Arena: BT Arena; Referees: Janusz Calik (POL), Petr Hrůša (CZE), Beniamino Manuel Attard (ITA)

4 March 2020	Bakken Bears (Denmark)	79–66	(Belarus) Tsmoki Minsk	Aarhus
18:30	Scoring by quarter: 14–23, 23–12, 15–13, 27–18
	Pts: Evans 14; Rebs: Evans, Ongwae 8 Asts: Hilliard 6 Eff: Evans 19	Boxscore	Pts: Lowery 17; Rebs: Salash 11; Asts: Lowery 8 Eff: Lowery 23	Arena: Vejlby-Risskov Hallen; Referees: Michal Proc (POL), Alexandre Deman (FRA), Gintaras Mačiulis (LTU)

4 March 2020	Kyiv Basket (Ukraine)	71–89	(Turkey) Pınar Karşıyaka	Kyiv
19:30	Scoring by quarter: 21–20, 19–28, 20–19, 11–22
	Pts: Bliznyuk 16; Rebs: Petrov 6 Asts: Klassen 7 Eff: Bliznyuk 19	Boxscore	Pts: 3 players 16; Rebs: Kennedy 8 Asts: Taylor, M'Baye 4 Eff: Triche 24	Arena: Meridian Sports Complex; Referees: Tanel Suslov (EST), Vladimir Jevtović (SRB), Zdenko Tomašovič (SVK)

=== Second leg ===
11 March 2020	Tsmoki Minsk (Belarus)	87–93 (153–172 agg.)	(Denmark) Bakken Bears	Minsk
17:00	Scoring by quarter: 21–27, 26–24, 17–18, 23–24
	Pts: Salash 23; Rebs: Gavrilovic 11; Asts: Lowery 18; Eff: Lowery 29	Boxscore	Pts: Jukic 20; Rebs: Evans 5 Asts: Hilliard 6 Eff: Hilliard 21	Arena: Minsk Arena; Referees: Gintaras Vitkauskas (LTU), Josip Jurčević (CRO), Blaž Zupančič (SLO)

11 March 2020	Pınar Karşıyaka (Turkey)	88–67 (177–138 agg.)	(Ukraine) Kyiv Basket	İzmir
17:00	Scoring by quarter: 19–20, 19–12, 19–17, 31–18
	Pts: Birsen 16; Rebs: Kennedy, Morgan 9 Asts: Morgan, Yıldırım 3 Eff: Morgan 21	Boxscore	Pts: Pavlov 23; Rebs: Pavlov 7 Asts: Petrov 5 Eff: Pavlov 24	Arena: Mustafa Kemal Atatürk Karşıyaka Sport Hall; Referees: Andris Aunkrogers (LAT), Petr Hrůša (CZE), Anastasios Manos (GRE)

11 March 2020	Ventspils (Latvia)	90–112 (167–190 agg.)	(Turkey) Bahçeşehir Koleji	Ventspils
18:00	Scoring by quarter: 11–34, 24–30, 25–23, 30–25
	Pts: Shorts 20; Rebs: Čavars 10; Asts: Shorts 9 Eff: Shorts 25	Boxscore	Pts: Golden 41; Rebs: Golden 11; Asts: Mathiang 19; Eff: Golden 44	Arena: Ventspils Olympic Center; Referees: Janusz Calik (POL), Dariusz Zapolski (POL), Goran Sljivic (AUT)

11 March 2020	medi Bayreuth (Germany)	100–87 (182–170 agg.)	(Romania) U-BT Cluj-Napoca	Bayreuth
18:30	Scoring by quarter: 20–22, 26–26, 36–20, 18–19
	Pts: Three Players 15; Rebs: Linhart 6 Asts: Linhart 7 Eff: Linhart 25	Boxscore	Pts: Peak 23; Rebs: Peak 10; Asts: Richard 5 Eff: Peak 28	Arena: Oberfrankenhalle; Referees: Tanel Suslov (EST), Ilias Kounelles (CYP), Andrei Sharapa (BEL)

== Semifinals ==
The first legs were to be played on 25 March, and the second legs were to be played on 1 April 2019. Team 2 played the second leg at home.

Team 1	Agg.	Team 2	1st leg	2nd leg
Medi Bayreuth (Germany)	Cancelled	(Turkey) Pınar Karşıyaka	Cancelled	Cancelled
Bahçeşehir Koleji (Turkey)	Cancelled	(Denmark) Bakken Bears	Cancelled	Cancelled

=== First leg ===
25 March 2020 (cancelled)	Bahçeşehir Koleji (Turkey)	vs.	(Denmark) Bakken Bears	Istanbul
	Eff:		Eff:	Arena: BJK Akatlar Arena

25 March 2020 (cancelled)	medi Bayreuth (Germany)	vs.	(Turkey) Pınar Karşıyaka	Bayreuth
	Eff:		Eff:	Arena: Oberfrankenhalle

=== Second leg ===
1 April 2020 (cancelled)	Bakken Bears (Denmark)	vs.	(Turkey) Bahçeşehir Koleji	Aarhus
	Eff:		Eff:	Arena: Vejlby-Risskov Hallen

1 April 2020 (cancelled)	Pınar Karşıyaka (Turkey)	vs.	(Germany) medi Bayreuth	İzmir
	Eff:		Eff:	Arena: Mustafa Kemal Atatürk Karşıyaka Sport Hall

== Final ==
The first leg were to be played on 22 April, and the second leg were to be played on 29 April 2020. Team 2 played the second leg at home.

Team 1	Agg.	Team 2	1st leg	2nd leg
N/A	Cancelled	N/A	Cancelled	Cancelled
