= Mike Caffey =

American basketball player (born 1993)

No. 55 – Šiauliai
- Position: Point guard
- League: LKL; EuroCup

Personal information
- Born: February 17, 1993 (age 33) Riverside, California, U.S.
- Listed height: 6 ft 0 in (1.83 m)
- Listed weight: 175 lb (79 kg)

Career information
- High school: Centennial (Corona, California)
- College: Long Beach State (2011–2015)
- NBA draft: 2015: undrafted
- Playing career: 2015–present

Career history
- 2015–2016: Jászberény
- 2016–2017: Aries Trikala
- 2018: Helsinki Seagulls
- 2019–2020: BKM Lučenec
- 2020–2021: Zaporizhya
- 2021–2022: Kyiv-Basket
- 2022: Crailsheim Merlins
- 2022–2023: MZT Skopje
- 2023–2024: Czarni Słupsk
- 2024–2026: CSO Voluntari
- 2026–present: Šiauliai

Career highlights
- Macedonian League champion (2023); Macedonian Cup winner (2023); Hungarian League All-Star (2015); ENBL champion (2025); ENBL Final MVP (2025); Ukrainian League MVP (2021); 3× First-team All-Big West (2013–2015)

Mike Caffey (born February 17, 1993) is an American professional basketball player for Šiauliai of the Lithuanian Basketball League (LKL) and the EuroCup. He played four years of college basketball for the Long Beach State 49ers.

== High school career ==
Caffey played high school basketball at Centennial.

== College career ==
As a true freshman, Caffey played in all 34 games, starting two, averaging 5.9 points, 2.8 rebounds, 2.2 assists and 0.7 steals per game. As a sophomore, he started all 33 games for LBSU, averaging 32.8 minutes, 12.0 points, 4.0 rebounds, 1.4 steals and 3.8 assists per game, improving his numbers a lot. Due to his performances, he Earned a First-Team All-Big West honor. During the next two years, his numbers became better and Caffey managed to gain First-Team All-Big West honors another two times, and was a three-time first-team All-Conference pick.

== Professional career ==
After going undrafted in the 2015 NBA draft, Caffey joined Jászberényi KSE of the Hungarian League. During his rookie professional year, Caffey averaged 15 points, 4.5 rebounds and 3.4 assists per game, and was also included to the Hungarian All-Star Game.

On September 20, 2016, he signed with Aries Trikala of the Greek Basket League. He went on to average 8.4 points, 3.2 rebounds and 3.1 assists per game.

On January 2, 2017, Caffey joined Helsinki Seagulls of the Korisliiga.

On July 12, 2020, he has signed with BC Zaporizhya of the UA SuperLeague.

On March 23, 2022, he has signed with Crailsheim Merlins of the Basketball Bundesliga.

On June 27, 2023, he signed with Czarni Słupsk of the PLK.

On July 28, 2024, he signed with CSO Voluntari of the Liga Națională.

On August 27, 2026, Caffey signed one–year contract with Šiauliai of the Lithuanian Basketball League (LKL) and the EuroCup.
