= 2017–18 Ukrainian Basketball SuperLeague =

Ukrainian Basketball SuperLeague
- Season: 2017–18
- Duration: 29 September 2017 – May 2018
- Teams: 8

Regular season
- Season MVP: Oleksandr Kol'čenko

Finals
- Champions: Cherkaski Mavpy (1st title)
- Runners-up: Dnipro

The 2017–18 Ukrainian Basketball SuperLeague was the 2017–18 edition of the Ukrainian top-tier basketball championship. The season started on 29 September 2017. Cherkaski Mavpy won its first national championship after defeating Dnipro in the finals, 0–3.

== Teams ==
Location of teams in 2017–18 Basketball SuperLeague

After the withdrawal of Kremin and Volynbasket, only eight teams would participate in the 2017–18 season.

| Team | City | Arena |
|---|---|---|
| BIPA | Odesa | Palace of Sports |
| Budivelnyk | Kyiv | Kyiv Sports Palace |
| Cherkaski Mavpy | Cherkasy | Sportpalace Budivelnyk |
| Dnipro | Dnipro | Sportcomplex Shynnik |
| Khimik | Yuzhne | Sportcomplex Olymp |
| Mykolaiv | Mykolaiv | Sports School Nadiya |
| Politekhnik | Kharkiv | |
| Zaporizhzhia | Zaporizhzhia | Palace of Sports ZAB |

== Regular season ==
| Pos | Team | Pld | W | L | PF | PA | PD | Pts | Qualification |
|---|---|---|---|---|---|---|---|---|---|
| 1 | Dnipro | 28 | 25 | 3 | 2416 | 2006 | +410 | 53 | Qualification to playoffs |
| 2 | Cherkaski Mavpy | 28 | 20 | 8 | 2364 | 2211 | +153 | 48 | Qualification to playoffs |
| 3 | Budivelnyk | 28 | 19 | 9 | 2219 | 1993 | +226 | 47 | Qualification to playoffs |
| 4 | Khimik | 28 | 14 | 14 | 2251 | 2184 | +67 | 42 | Qualification to playoffs |
| 5 | BIPA | 28 | 11 | 17 | 2124 | 2313 | −189 | 39 | Qualification to playoffs |
| 6 | Mykolaiv | 28 | 10 | 18 | 2142 | 2277 | −135 | 38 | Qualification to playoffs |
| 7 | Politekhnik | 28 | 7 | 21 | 2100 | 2419 | −319 | 35 | Qualification to playoffs |
| 8 | Zaporizhzhia | 28 | 6 | 22 | 2074 | 2287 | −213 | 34 | Qualification to playoffs |

Source: FBU, Flashscores.com

== Playoffs ==
Quarterfinals were played in a best-of-three playoff format. Semifinals were played with a 2-2-1 format and the finals with a 2-2-1-1-1 format.

Quarter-finals
1 Dnipro | 85 | 82
8 Zaporizhzhia | 82 | 78
4 Khimik | 80 | 96
5 BIPA | 69 | 86
2 Cherkaski Mavpy | 128 | 104
7 Politekhnik | 89 | 80
3 Budivelnyk | 63 | 50
6 Mykolaiv | 82 | 53

Semi-finals
1 Dnipro | 96 | 67 | 81 | 75
4 Khimik | 62 | 62 | 99 | 69
2 Cherkaski Mavpy | 91 | 83 | 59
6 Mykolaiv | 78 | 54 | 57

Final
1 Dnipro | 75 | 72 | 66
2 Cherkaski Mavpy | 76 | 76 | 79

| Third place |
| 4 Khimik | 71 | 100 | 68 |
| 6 Mykolaiv | 60 | 92 | 66 |

== Individual awards ==
Most Valuable Player

| Player | Team | Ref. |
|---|---|---|
| (Ukraine) Oleksandr Kolchenko | Cherkaski Mavpy | |

== Ukrainian clubs in European competitions ==
| Team | Competition | Progress |
|---|---|---|
| BC Budivelnyk | Champions League | Second qualifying round |
| BC Khimik | FIBA Europe Cup | Regular season |
| Dnipro | FIBA Europe Cup | First qualifying round |
