= Ukrainian Basketball League =

- Full name: Ukrainian Basketball League
- Short name: UBL
- Founded: 2008
- Dissolved: 2009
- President: Mykhailo Brodskyy
- Director general: Kyrylo Pogostinskyj
- League: UBL, Super League

The Ukrainian Basketball League was the professional basketball division in Ukraine in 2008–09 season alongside the country's top pro basketball league, the Ukrainian Men's Basketball SuperLeague.

== 2008–09 season ==
In the only 2008–09 season, Division A was represented by the following clubs:

- BC Kryvbasbasket Kryvyj Rig (Winner)
- BC Budivelnyk Kyiv (Runner-Up)
- BC Polytekhnika-Halychyna Lviv (Third)
- BC Hoverla Ivano-Frankivsk
- BC Griffon Simferopol
- BC Dnipro
- BC Dnipro-Azot Dniprodzerzhynsk
- BC Odesa
- BC Ferro-ZNTU Zaporizhya
- BC Cherkaski Mavpy

Under the aegis of UBL the women’s Ukrainian basketball League that united 10 professional clubs was also formed.

== Goal ==
The main task that UBL sets for itself was the popularization of basketball in Ukraine, the improvement of Ukrainian basketball players’ skills and the revival of Ukrainian basketball prestige. The President of UBL was Mykhailo Brodskyy.

== History ==
Ukrainian basketball League was created on 20 June 2008 as an alternative body to Ukrainian basketball Federation. The following key principles are put to the basis of UBL operation: sight, competition and openness. That is why today in UBL, as in NBA, the clubs are limited with their budget top margins, which guarantees to all teams the same and equal opportunities. Another key difference of UBL is “the course to Ukrainization” of domestic basketball. The Regulations of the League demand the presence on playing court a minimum of one Ukrainian player out of five. This approach gives an opportunity to involve Ukrainian stars in games and to stimulate investments in formation of domestic basketball schools. During the first year of its existence UBL had organized several arrangements that combined the sporting activities with elements of show, such as All-Star Game and UBL Cup Final Four.

== See also ==
- Ukrainian Men's Basketball SuperLeague
- Ukrainian Basketball All-Star Game
