= Rashad Vaughn =

American basketball player (born 1996)

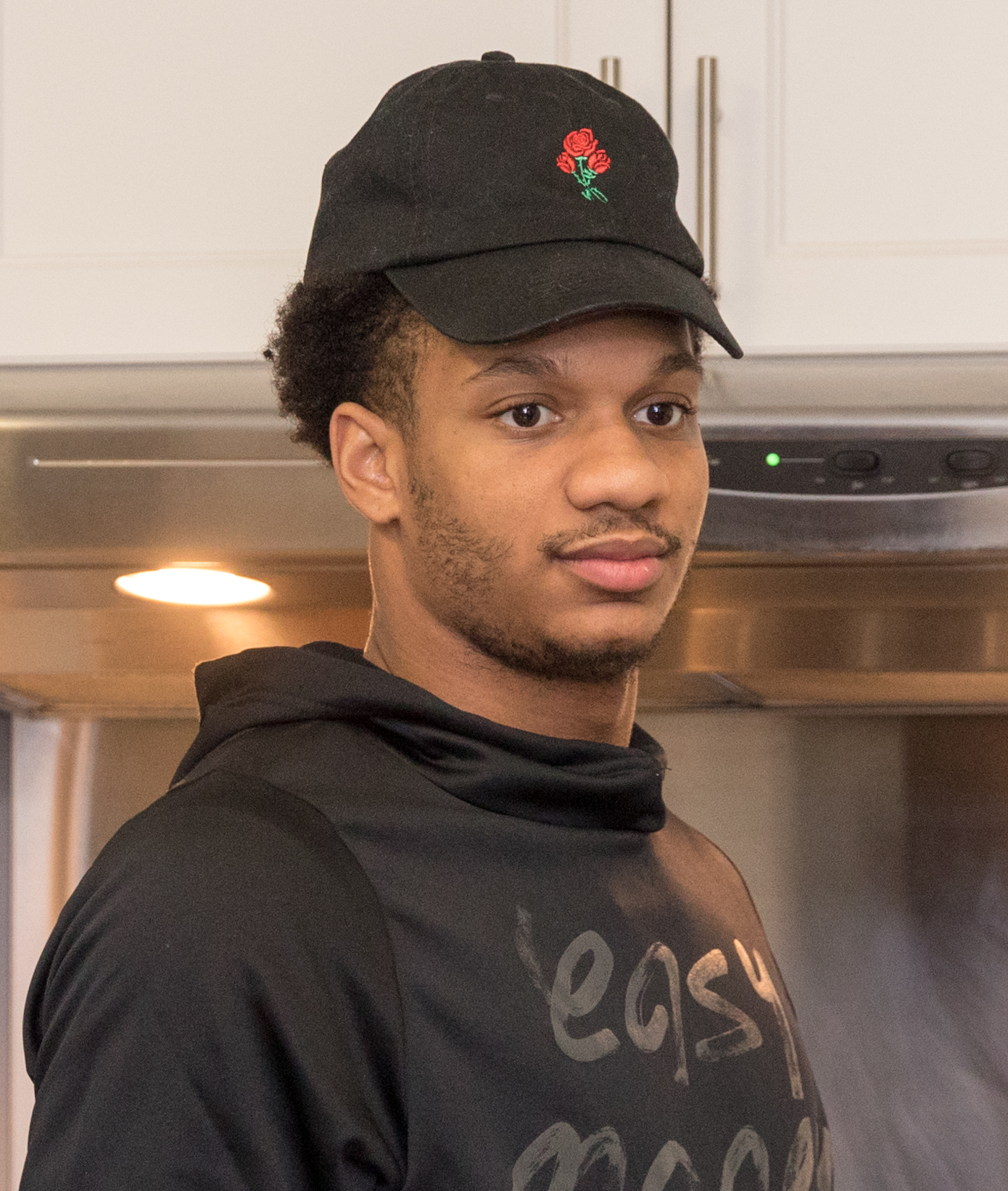
- Vaughn in 2017

No. 20 – Kesatria Bengawan Solo
- Position: Small forward / shooting guard
- League: IBL

Personal information
- Born: August 16, 1996 (age 30) Minneapolis, Minnesota, U.S.
- Listed height: 6 ft 6 in (1.98 m)
- Listed weight: 202 lb (92 kg)

Career information
- High school: Robbinsdale Cooper (New Hope, Minnesota); Findlay Prep (Henderson, Nevada)
- College: UNLV (2014–2015)
- NBA draft: 2015: 1st round, 17th overall pick
- Drafted by: Milwaukee Bucks
- Playing career: 2015–present

Career history
- 2015–2018: Milwaukee Bucks
- 2016: →Canton Charge
- 2016: →Westchester Knicks
- 2018: Brooklyn Nets
- 2018: Orlando Magic
- 2018: Texas Legends
- 2018–2019: Delaware Blue Coats
- 2019–2020: Igokea
- 2020: Budućnost
- 2020–2021: Prometey
- 2021: Dnipro
- 2022: Lavrio
- 2022–2023: Cleveland Charge
- 2023–2024: Apollon Patras
- 2024–2025: Lavrio
- 2025-present: Kesatria Bengawan Solo

Career highlights
- Ukrainian League champion (2021); Ukrainian Basketball SuperLeague Finals MVP (2021); MWC Freshman of the Year (2015); McDonald's All-American (2014)
- Stats at NBA.com
- Stats at Basketball Reference

Rashad DeAndre Vaughn (born August 16, 1996) is an American professional basketball player for Kesatria Bengawan Solo of the Indonesian Basketball League (IBL). He played college basketball for the UNLV Runnin' Rebels.

== High school career ==
For the first three years of his high school career, Vaughn attended Robbinsdale Cooper High School in New Hope, Minnesota. As a junior in 2012–13, he averaged 28 points and nine rebounds per game. For his senior year, he transferred to Findlay Prep in Henderson, Nevada, where he averaged 19.9 points and 4.9 assists per game in 2013–14. He subsequently earned McDonald's All-American honors and Jordan Brand Classic selection.

== College career ==
After considering offers from Iowa State, Kansas, Kentucky and North Carolina, Vaughn finally committed to UNLV. Vaughn played one season of college basketball for UNLV where he was named the Mountain West Conference Freshman of the Year after averaging 17.8 points and 4.8 rebounds in 23 games.

== Professional career ==
=== Milwaukee Bucks (2015–2018) ===
On June 25, 2015, Vaughn was selected by the Milwaukee Bucks with the 17th overall pick in the 2015 NBA draft. He later joined the Bucks for the 2015 NBA Summer League and signed his rookie scale contract with the team on July 17. He made his debut for the Bucks in the team's season opener against the New York Knicks on October 28, scoring 10 points off the bench in a 122–97 loss. On March 18, 2016, pursuant to the flexible assignment rule, he was assigned to the Canton Charge, the Cleveland Cavaliers' D-League affiliate. On March 26, he was recalled by the Bucks.

On October 29, 2016, Vaughn scored a career-high 22 points and hit six three-pointers in a 110–108 win over the Brooklyn Nets. On November 19, pursuant to the flexible assignment rule, he was assigned to the Westchester Knicks and was recalled four days later. On November 26, he was reassigned to Westchester and recalled on December 1.

=== Brooklyn Nets (2018) ===
On February 5, 2018, Vaughn was traded, along with a second-round pick, to the Brooklyn Nets in exchange for Tyler Zeller. He made his debut for the Nets the following day, collecting one assist in four minutes against the Houston Rockets. On February 8, 2018, Vaughn was traded to the New Orleans Pelicans in exchange for Dante Cunningham. He was waived by the Pelicans two days later.

=== Orlando Magic (2018) ===
On February 20, 2018, Vaughn signed a 10-day contract with the Orlando Magic. He signed a second 10-day contract with the Magic on March 2, only to be waived by the team five days later due to injury.

=== Texas Legends (2018) ===
On October 8, 2018, the Mavericks announced they signed Vaughn to a training camp deal. He was waived three days later. He then was added to the roster of the Texas Legends, the Mavericks’ G League affiliate.

=== Delaware Blue Coats (2018–2019) ===
On December 31, 2018, Vaughn, alongside a 2019 third-round draft pick, was traded to the Delaware Blue Coats for the returning player rights to Askia Booker and a 2019 second-round pick.

=== Igokea (2019–2020) ===
On July 30, 2019, Vaughn signed a one-year contract for Igokea of the Adriatic League. He averaged 16.5 points per game.

=== Budućnost VOLI (2020) ===
On June 7, 2020, he signed with Budućnost. On October 23, Budućnost and Vaughn parted ways after he appeared in six games.

=== Prometey (2020–2021) ===
On December 22, 2020, he has signed with Prometey of the Ukrainian Basketball SuperLeague.

=== Dnipro (2021) ===
On August 12, 2021, he has signed with Dnipro of the Ukrainian Basketball SuperLeague. Vaughn averaged 12.2 points, 4 rebounds and 1.6 assists per game. He parted ways with the team on November 28.

=== Lavrio (2022) ===
On January 28, 2022, Vaughn signed with Lavrio of the Greek Basket League and the Basketball Champions League. In 12 league games, he averaged 14.4 points, 4.6 rebounds and 1 assist in 25 minutes per game.

=== Cleveland Charge (2022–2023) ===
On October 24, 2022, Vaughn joined the Cleveland Charge training camp roster.

=== Apollon Patras (2023–2024) ===
On November 20, 2023, Vaughn signed with Apollon Patras of the Greek Basket League. On January 29, 2024, Vaughn parted ways with the Greek club and was replaced by Ryan Boatright.

== Career statistics ==
=== NBA ===
Legend
GP	Games played	GS	Games started	MPG	Minutes per game
FG%	Field goal percentage	3P%	3-point field goal percentage	FT%	Free throw percentage
RPG	Rebounds per game	APG	Assists per game	SPG	Steals per game
BPG	Blocks per game	PPG	Points per game	**Bold**	Career high

==== Regular season ====
Year	Team	GP	GS	MPG	FG%	3P%	FT%	RPG	APG	SPG	BPG	PPG
2015–16	Milwaukee	**70**	**6**	**14.3**	.305	.293	**.800**	**1.3**	.6	.4	**.2**	3.1
2016–17	Milwaukee	41	2	11.2	.365	.321	.400	1.2	.6	**.5**	**.2**	**3.5**
2017–18	Milwaukee	22	0	7.9	**.402**	.371	.667	.8	.5	.2	.1	2.7
2017–18	Brooklyn	1	0	4.0	–	–	–	.0	**1.0**	.0	.0	.0
2017–18	Orlando	5	0	7.0	.333	**.500**	–	.8	.0	.2	.0	1.0
Career		139	8	12.0	.337	.313	.692	1.1	.5	.4	.2	3.0

==== Playoffs ====
Year	Team	GP	GS	MPG	FG%	3P%	FT%	RPG	APG	SPG	BPG	PPG
2017	Milwaukee	3	0	3.3	.500	1.000	–	.0	.0	.0	.0	2.0
Career		3	0	3.3	.500	1.000	–	.0	.0	.0	.0	2.0

=== College ===
Year	Team	GP	GS	MPG	FG%	3P%	FT%	RPG	APG	SPG	BPG	PPG
2014–15	UNLV	23	23	32.3	.439	.383	.694	4.8	1.6	.8	.3	17.8
