= Maksym Lutsenko =

Ukrainian basketball player

No. 8 – Kyiv-Basket
- Position: Small forward
- League: Ukrainian Basketball SuperLeague

Personal information
- Born: January 30, 1993 (age 33) Druzhkivka, Ukraine
- Listed height: 6.2 ft 0 in (1.89 m)
- Listed weight: 198 lb (90 kg)

Career information
- NBA draft: 2015: undrafted
- Playing career: 2010–present

Career history
- 2010–2014: Azovmash
- 2010–2014: BC Kyiv
- 2015–2017: Budivelnyk
- 2018–present: Kyiv-Basket

Maksym Lutsenko (born January 30, 1993) is a Ukrainian professional basketball player, who plays for Kyiv-Basket of the Ukrainian Basketball SuperLeague.

He is able to play as a small forward and a point guard.
