= Volodymyr Koniev =

Ukrainian basketball player

No. 24 – BC Budivelnyk
- Position: Small forward / power forward
- League: Ukrainian Basketball SuperLeague

Personal information
- Born: 18 June 1989 (age 36) Kharkiv, Ukraine
- Listed height: 6 ft 8 in (2.03 m)
- Listed weight: 191 lb (87 kg)

Career information
- NBA draft: 2011: undrafted

Career history
- 2017–2020: Cherkaski Mavpy
- 2021–present: Budivelnyk
- 2022: →Pieno žvaigždės

Volodymyr Koniev (born 18 June 1989) is a Ukrainian basketball player for BC Budivelnyk of the Ukrainian Basketball SuperLeague. He also represents the Ukraine national team.

He participated at the EuroBasket 2017.
