= BC Ternopil =

Ukrainian basketball team

Ternopil
- Leagues: Ukrainian Basketball Superleague
- Founded: 2017; 8 years ago
- History: Ternopil; 2017–present
- Arena: FOK
- Capacity: 500
- Location: Ternopil, Ukraine
- Team colors: Green, Yellow
- Head coach: Dmytro Zabirchenko

BC Ternopil (Ukrainian: БК Тернопіль) is a Ukrainian basketball club based in Ternopil. Founded in 2017, the team made its debut in the Ukrainian Basketball Superleague in 2020.

== Players ==
=== Current squad ===
BC Ternopil roster
Players
Coaches

Pos.	No.	Nat.	Name	Ht.	Wt.	Age
PF		(United States)	Ugba, Averyl	1.97 m (6 ft 6 in)	106 kg (234 lb)	30 – 4 December 1994
G		(United States)	Bowie, Adrian	1.88 m (6 ft 2 in)	86 kg (190 lb)	35 – 6 August 1989
F		(Ukraine)	Kalnichenko, Andrii	2.01 m (6 ft 7 in)	209 kg (461 lb)	38 – 27 March 1986

Head coach

- (Ukraine) Dmytro Zabirchenko

Athletic trainer(s)

Doctor

Manager

Legend

- (C) Team captain
- Injured

- Roster
Updated: 17 July 2020

=== Squad changes 2020–21 ===
==== In ====
No.	Pos.	Nat.	Name	Age	Moving from		Type	Ends	Transfer fee	Date	Source
	PF	(United States)	Averyl Yugba	25	BC Khimik	(Ukraine)	1 year	2021	Free	17 July 2020	
