= 2015–16 SL Favorit Sport season =

2015–16 SL Favorit Sport season^{1}
- Duration: October 10, 2015 – May 2, 2016
- Games played: 170
- Teams: 9

Regular season
- Season MVP: (Ukraine) Dmytro Gliebov

Finals
- Champions: Khimik (2nd title)
- Runners-up: Dynamo Kyiv
- Third place: Kryvbas
- Fourth place: Cherkaski Mavpy
- Finals MVP: (United States) Branden Frazier

Statistical leaders
Points	(Ukraine) Andriy Lebedintsev	20.3
Rebounds	(Ukraine) Artem Shvets	9.6
Assists	(Ukraine) Andriy Lebedintsev	7.7

Records
- Biggest home win: Khimik 111–59 Dynamo Kyiv (28 November 2015), Kryvbas 106–54 BIPA Odesa (5 April 2016)
- Biggest away win: Infiz Kyiv 83–122 Cherkaski Mavpy (31 March 2016)
- Highest scoring: Infiz Kyiv 102–107 Mykolaiv (2 April 2016)
- Winning streak: 12 games Kryvbas
- Losing streak: 16 games Infiz Kyiv
- ^{1} Sponsored league name.

The 2015–16 SL Favorit Sport was the 1st season of the newly established Ukrainian top-tier basketball competition, the Ukrainian SL Favorit Sport. The season started on October 10, 2015.

== Separation ==
At the start of the 2015–16 season, the SL Favorit Sport league was founded, and several teams from the Ukrainian SuperLeague, including the league's champions, Khimik, left the Ukrainian SuperLeague and joined the newly formed Ukrainian SL Favorit Sport league.

== Teams ==
Team	City
BIPA Odesa	Odesa
Infiz Kyiv	Kyiv
Dynamo Kyiv	Kyiv
Mykolaiv	Mykolaiv
Zaporizhzhia	Zaporizhzhia
VolynBasket	Lutsk
Kryvbas	Kryvyi Rih
Cherkaski Mavpy	Cherkaski
Khimik	Yuzhny

== Regular season ==
Pos	Team	Pld	W	L	PF	PA	PD	Pts	Qualification or relegation
1	Khimik	32	28	4	2667	2106	+561	60	Qualification to playoffs
2	Kryvbas	32	26	6	2382	2071	+311	58	Qualification to playoffs
3	Dynamo Kyiv	32	23	9	2452	2217	+235	55	Qualification to playoffs
4	Cherkaski Mavpy	32	18	14	2601	2492	+109	50	Qualification to playoffs
5	MBC Mykolaiv	32	14	18	2323	2405	−82	46	Qualification to playoffs
6	Zaporizhzhia	32	14	18	2315	2395	−80	46	Qualification to playoffs
7	BIPA Odesa	32	13	19	2273	2382	−109	45	Qualification to playoffs
8	Volynbasket	32	5	27	2209	2668	−459	37	Qualification to playoffs
9	Infiz Kyiv	32	3	29	2409	2895	−486	35	

Source: Flashscore

== Playoffs ==
Quarter Finals
1	Khimik	2
8	VolynBasket	0
4	Cherkaski Mavpy	2
5	Mykolaiv	1
2	Kryvbas	2
7	BIPA Odesa	0
3	Dynamo Kyiv	2
6	Zaporizhzhia	0

Semifinals
1	Khimik	3
4	Cherkaski Mavpy	0
2	Kryvbas	2
3	Dynamo Kyiv	3

Finals
1	Khimik	3
3	Dynamo Kyiv	1
Third place
2	Kryvbas	3
4	Cherkaski Mavpy	2
