= BC Infiz =

BK Infiz СК "ИНФИЗ"
- Leagues: Ukrainian SL Favorit Sport
- Location: Kyiv, Ukraine
- Team colors: Red, Navy

BK Infiz (in Ukrainian: СК "ИНФИЗ") was a professional basketball team based in Kyiv, Ukraine. In the 2015–16 season, the team entered the Ukrainian SL Favorit Sport – a newly formed top-tier league in Ukraine.

== Notable players ==
- (Ukraine) Andriy Lebedintsev
- (Ukraine) Artem Shvets

== Season by season ==
Season	Tier	League	Pos.	Postseason	RS	PO
2015–16	1	Ukrainian SL Favorit Sport	9	–	3–29	–
