= Vitaliy Cherniy =

Ukrainian basketball player and coach

BC Lietkabelis
- Position: Head coach

Personal information
- Born: 1971 (age 54–55)

Career history

Coaching
- Budivelnyk Kyiv
- BC Lietkabelis

Vitaliy Cherniy (born 1971) is a Ukrainian basketball coach and former player. Today he is the coach of BC Kyiv, a member of the Ukrainian Basketball SuperLeague, and a former head coach of Ukraine national basketball team.

== Career ==
Vitaliy Cherniy was born in Kyiv, in the Ukrainian SSR of the Soviet Union (in present-day Ukraine). He played for 13 years in Ukrainian Superleague clubs. After finishing his playing career, he was the assistant of the well-known Lithuanian coach Rimantas Endrijaitis in the Ukrainian BC Sumy. He left the club in 2007 and became a temporary assistant coach of the Ukraine national basketball team. In 2008, he was the head coach of Ukraine U-16 basketball team and reached 9th place in the European Championship.

After the Championship, he signed a long-term contract with BC Kyiv as the general manager of junior teams. At 2009, when BC Kyiv sacked all of their foreign players due to financial problems, the young players of academy took the lead and BC Kyiv reached 4th place in the Ukrainian Superleague with Ukrainian players only.

Cherniy was named new BC Kyiv coach in September 2009 and led this young all-Ukrainian team to the playoffs semifinal. In April 2010, he was named as new Head Coach of Ukraine national basketball team, the youngest national coach in the history of Ukrainian basketball.

== Sources ==
- Vitaliy Cherniy is BK Kyiv coach
- Vitaliy Cherniy's interview
- http://basketball.sport.ua/news/92142
