= BC Prometey =

Ukrainian basketball club

Prometey
- Leagues: Ukrainian Basketball SuperLeague; Latvian-Estonian Basketball League
- Founded: 2018; 8 years ago
- Dissolved: 2024
- History: BC Prometey; 2018–2024
- Arena: SC Prometey; Arena Riga
- Capacity: 1,000 (SC Prometey); 11,200 (Arena Riga)
- Location: Kamianske, Ukraine (2018–2021); Slobozhanske, Ukraine (2021–2022); Riga, Latvia (2022–2024)
- Head coach: Ronen Ginzburg
- Championships: 1 Ukrainian League; 2 Higher League; 2 Latvian–Estonian Basketball League
- Website: prometeybc.com
Home	Away

BC Prometey (Ukrainian: БК Прометей), also known as Prometey Slobozhanske, was a Ukrainian basketball club based in Slobozhanske and Kamianske. It played in the Ukrainian Basketball SuperLeague, the highest tier of basketball in Ukraine, from 2019 to 2022.

From 2022 to 2024, the team was based in Riga and played in the Latvian-Estonian Basketball League due to the Russian invasion of Ukraine.

== History ==
The team logo used from 2018 to 2022

The team was founded as Sports Club Prometey in September 2018, by Volodymyr Dubynsky and Pavlo Chukhno. The plans were to develop a basketball and volleyball team.

In 2018, Prometey joined the Ukrainian Higher League, the national second tier. On October 8, 2018, they played their first game against Zolotyi Vik, winning 86–80. Prometey went on to win the league title at the first attempt. Therefore, it was promoted to the SuperLeague for the 2019–20 season.

In its first SuperLeague season, Prometey was in third place before the season was shut down because of the COVID-19 pandemic. The following season, the club enrolled for the FIBA Europe Cup and made their European debut.

In 2021, Prometey won its first Ukrainian SuperLeague championship. The following season, Prometey made its debut at the European stage when it played in the Qualifying Rounds of the 2021–22 Basketball Champions League. In its debut season, it immediately qualified for the regular season and then advanced to the round of 16. Following the 2022 Russian invasion of Ukraine, Prometey withdrew from the competition and disbanded all teams of the club as club president Volodymyr Dubinskyi cited: "All money and resources should go to the army. Win first. Then everything.". All the club's teams were dissolved in March 2022.

In June 2022, Prometey was included in the list of teams participating in the 2022–23 EuroCup Basketball. The team practiced and played their home games in Riga, as playing in Ukraine was not possible due to the war. Prometey reached the semifinals of the EuroCup in 2023.

Prometey also joined the Latvian–Estonian Basketball League, consisting of teams from Estonia and Latvia, and won two consecutive league titles.

The club shut down its operations in the summer of 2024, as the team had been dealing with legal troubles with Ukrainian police and investigators launching a high-profile investigation concerning club president Dubinskiy and his companies. The club's men's and women's volleyball section were also shut down.

== Honours ==
- Ukrainian SuperLeague
  - Champions (1): 2020–21
- Ukrainian Higher League
  - Winners (2): 2018–19, 2023–24
- Latvian-Estonian League
  - Champions (2): 2022–23, 2023–24

== Season by season ==
Champions	Runners-up	Promoted	Playoff berth

Season	Tier	League	Finish	Wins	Losses	Win%	Playoffs	Other competitions	Head coach
Prometey Kamianske
2018–19	2	Ukrainian Higher League	1st	26	2	.929	Won semi-finals (Khimik-2), 2–0; Won finals (Rivne), 3–0	–	Dmitry Markov
2019–20	1	Ukrainian SuperLeague	3rd	16	8	.667	Curtailed due to COVID-19 pandemic	–	Kārlis Muižnieks
2020–21	1	Ukrainian SuperLeague	3rd	27	13	.675	Winners; Won quarterfinals (Khimik, 3–0); Won semifinals (Dnipro, 3–1); Won finals (Zaporizhzhia, 3–0)	FIBA Europe Cup; Round of 16	Vitaliy Cherniy; Ronen Ginzburg
2021–22	1	Ukrainian SuperLeague	1st	25	1	.962	Curtailed and voided due to Russian invasion of Ukraine	Champions League; Round of 16	Ronen Ginzburg
2022–23	1	Latvian–Estonian	1st	29	1	.967	Winners; Won quarterfinals (Viimsi, 2–1); Won semifinal (Tartu, 89–69); Won final (VEF Rīga, 77–62)	EuroCup Basketball; SF	Ronen Ginzburg

== Head coaches ==
Period	Name
2018–2019	(Ukraine) Dmitry Markov
2019–2020	(Latvia) Kārlis Muižnieks
2020–2021	(Ukraine) Vitaliy Cherniy
2021–2024	(Czech Republic) Ronen Ginzburg

== Notable players ==
Note: Flags indicate national team eligibility at FIBA-sanctioned events. Players may hold other non-FIBA nationalities not displayed.

Criteria

To appear in this section a player must have either:

- Set a club record or won an individual award while at the club
- Played at least one official international match for their national team at any time
- Played at least one official NBA match at any time.

- (United States) Davon Reed 1 season: 2023
- (United States) Rashad Vaughn 1 season: 2020–21
- (United States) D. J. Stephens 3 seasons: 2020–23
- (United States) D. J. Kennedy 3 seasons: 2021–24
- (Puerto Rico) Gian Clavell 2 seasons: 2022–24
- (Czech Republic) Ondřej Balvín 2 seasons: 2022–24
- (Nigeria) Caleb Agada 2 seasons: 2022–24
- (Ukraine) Denys Lukashov 5 seasons: 2019–24
- (Ukraine) Oleksandr Lypovyy 4 seasons: 2020–24
- (Ukraine) Viacheslav Petrov 3 seasons: 2020–23
- (Ukraine) Oleksandr Belikov 1 season: 2020–21
- (Ukraine) Issuf Sanon 2 seasons: 2022–24
- (Ukraine) Ivan Tkachenko 2 seasons: 2022–24
- (Ukraine) Illia Sydorov 5 seasons: 2019–24
- (Lithuania) Arnoldas Kulboka 1 season: 2023-24
- (Puerto Rico) Tai Odiase (2023–24)
