= BC Dynamo Kyiv =

- Leagues: Ukrainian SL Favorit Sport
- Location: Kyiv, Ukraine
- Website: bcdynamo.kiev.ua/ua
Home	Away

BC Dynamo Kyiv was a professional basketball club based in Kyiv, Ukraine. In the 2015–16 season, the team entered the Ukrainian SL Favorit Sport – a newly formed top tier league in Ukraine.

== Honours ==
Ukrainian SL Favorit Sport

- Runner-up (1): 2016

== Season by season ==
Season	Tier	League	Pos.	Postseason	RS	PO
2015–16	1	Ukrainian SL Favorit Sport	3	Runner-up	23–9	6–5
