= MBC Mykolaiv =

- Leagues: Ukrainian Basketball SuperLeague
- Founded: 1967; 58 years ago
- History: List: Spartak Nikolaev (1972–1977) NKI Nikolaev (1977–1994) SK Mykolaiv (1994–2000) MBC Mykolaiv (2000–present)
- Capacity: 2,000
- Location: Mykolaiv, Ukraine
- Team colors: White, Navy, Sea Blue
- Website: mbcmklv.com
Home	Away

Logo used since 2000 until 2018.

Municipal Basketball Club Mykolaiv (in Ukrainian: Муніципальний Баскетбольний Клуб Миколаїв), commonly known as simply Mykolaiv, is a professional basketball team (club) of Mykolaiv, Ukraine. They currently play in the Ukrainian SL Favorit Sport.

== History ==
In 2009, the team finished in fifth place in the Ukrainian Men's Basketball SuperLeague. In the 2009 NBA draft basketball player Sergiy Gladyr was the 49th draft pick, in the second round by the Atlanta Hawks, but did not succeed in the teams' request. For the 2015–16 season, they joined the Ukrainian SL Favorit Sport.

== Season by season ==
Season	Tier	League	Pos.	Ukrainian Cup	European competitions	
2008–09	1	SuperLeague	5th		3 EuroChallenge	QR
2009–10	1	SuperLeague	9th			
2010–11	1	SuperLeague	5th			
2011–12	1	SuperLeague	12th			
2012–13	1	SuperLeague	10th			
2013–14	1	SuperLeague	7th			
2014–15	1	SuperLeague	7th	Quarterfinalist		
2015–16	1	SL Favorit Sport	5th	Quarterfinalist		
2016–17	1	SuperLeague	7th	Quarterfinalist		
2017–18	1	SuperLeague	4th	Round of 16		
2018–19	1	SuperLeague	5th	Quarterfinalist		

== Names ==
Through the years, MBC Mykolaiv has known several names:

- 1972—1977: Spartak (Nikolaev)
- 1977—1994: NKI (Nikolaev)
- 1994—2000: SK Mykolaiv
- since 2000: MBC Mykolaiv

== Honours ==
Ukrainian Basketball SuperLeague

- Runner-up (1): 1992
  - Third place (2): 1992–93, 1997–98

== Players ==
=== Current squad ===
Note: Flags indicate national team eligibility at FIBA-sanctioned events. Players may hold other non-FIBA nationalities not displayed.

MBC Mykolaiv roster
Players
Coaches

Pos.	No.	Nat.	Name	Ht.	Wt.	Age
С		(Ukraine)	Tsykaliuk, Oleksandr	2.03 m (6 ft 8 in)	100 kg (220 lb)	31 – 13 October 1993
G	3	(Ukraine)	Bobrov, Denys	1.91 m (6 ft 3 in)	80 kg (176 lb)	27 – 1 August 1997
G	7	(Ukraine)	Khokhonyk, Andrii	1.88 m (6 ft 2 in)	78 kg (172 lb)	27 – 7 August 1997
F	8	(Ukraine)	Onufriev, Oleksiy (C)	2.02 m (6 ft 8 in)	95 kg (209 lb)	43 – 24 February 1982
G	9	(Ukraine)	Lutsenko, Maksym	1.91 m (6 ft 3 in)	86 kg (190 lb)	32 – 30 January 1993
PG	11	(United States)	Peterson, QJ	1.83 m (6 ft 0 in)	83 kg (183 lb)	30 – 12 October 1994
G	15	(Ukraine)	Davydiuk, Anton	2.05 m (6 ft 9 in)	94 kg (207 lb)	32 – 6 May 1992
C	18	(Ukraine)	Yurchenko, Serhii	2.02 m (6 ft 8 in)	100 kg (220 lb)	38 – 17 March 1987
F	22	(Ukraine)	Pryimak, Serhii	2.04 m (6 ft 8 in)	91 kg (201 lb)	28 – 17 September 1996
C	33	(Russia)	Adediran, Aleksey	2.01 m (6 ft 7 in)	113 kg (249 lb)	42 – 30 October 1982
F	34	(Ukraine)	Meshcheriakov, Kyrylo	1.97 m (6 ft 6 in)	82 kg (181 lb)	29 – 17 August 1995
G	45	(Ukraine)	Zotov, Vitalii	1.88 m (6 ft 2 in)	84 kg (185 lb)	28 – 3 March 1997
C	55	(Haiti)	Bristol, Kervin	2.04 m (6 ft 8 in)	101 kg (223 lb)	36 – 4 September 1988

Head coach

- (Ukraine) Vitaliy Cherniy

Assistant coach(es)

Legend

- (C) Team captain
- Injured

- Roster
Updated: 30 January 2020
