= BC VolynBasket =

VolynBasket
- Founded: 2007; 19 years ago
- History: VolynBasket (2007–present)
- Location: Lutsk, Ukraine
- Team colors: Red, Black, White
- Website: volynbasket.com
Home	Away

VolynBasket (Ukrainian: Волиньбаскет) is a professional basketball club based in Lutsk, Ukraine. In the 2015–16 season, the team entered the Ukrainian SL Favorit Sport, a newly formed top tier league in Ukraine.

In 2021–22 season, the club plays in the third division of Ukrainian basketball.

== Season by season ==
Season	Tier	League	Pos.	Ukrainian Cup	European competitions
2012–13	2	Higher League	4th		
2013–14	2	Higher League	8th		
2014–15	2	Higher League	5th		
2015–16	1	SL Favorit Sport	8th		
2016–17	1	SuperLeague	9th (Note: VolynBasket withdrew from the SuperLeague after the 2016–17 season.)		
