= 2016–17 Ukrainian Basketball SuperLeague =

Ukrainian Basketball SuperLeague
- Season: 2016–17
- Teams: 11

Regular season
- Season MVP: (United States) Henry Dugat

Finals
- Champions: Budivelnyk (10th title)
- Runners-up: Khimik
- Third place: Dnipro
- Fourth place: Cherkaski Mavpy

The 2016–17 Ukrainian Basketball SuperLeague is the 2016–17 edition of the Ukrainian basketball championship., the first after merging the two leagues in the previous season.

== Teams ==
Eleven teams play in the 2016–17 season.

Team	City
BIPA Odesa	Odesa
Budivelnyk	Kyiv
Cherkaski Mavpy	Cherkasy
Dnipro	Dnipro
Khimik	Yuzhne
Kremin	Kremenchuk
Kryvbas	Kryvyi Rih
Mykolaiv	Mykolaiv
Politekhnik	Kharkiv
VolynBasket	Lutsk
Zaporizhzhia	Zaporizhzhia

== Regular season ==
Pos	Team	Pld	W	L	PF	PA	PD	Pts	Qualification
1	Budivelnyk	27	25	2	2208	1794	+414	52	Qualification to playoffs
2	Khimik	27	22	5	2219	1814	+405	49	Qualification to playoffs
3	Dnipro	27	21	6	2138	1797	+341	48	Qualification to playoffs
4	Cherkaski Mavpy	27	15	12	2064	2077	−13	42	Qualification to playoffs
5	BIPA Odesa	27	14	13	2044	2017	+27	41	Qualification to playoffs
6	Zaporizhya	27	13	14	2161	2059	+102	40	Qualification to playoffs
7	Mykolaiv	27	11	16	2014	2087	−73	38	Qualification to playoffs
8	Kremin	27	7	20	1876	2238	−362	34	Qualification to playoffs
9	Volynbasket	27	4	23	1750	2195	−445	31	
10	Politekhnik	27	3	24	1927	2323	−396	30	
11	Kryvbas (Note: Withdrew from the competition)	0	0	0	0	0	0	0	Withdrew

Source: Ukrainian Basketball Federation, Mismarcadores.com

== Playoffs ==
Quarter-finals
Budivelnyk	105	116
Kremin	82	64
Cherkaski Mavpy	92	66
BIPA Odesa	66	61
Khimik	95	96
Mykolaiv	67	95
Dnipro	94	97
Zaporizhya	70	79

Semi-finals
Budivelnyk	78	72	90
Cherkaski Mavpy	66	70	84
Khimik	76	71	62	65	75
Dnipro	73	52	71	81	71

Final
Budivelnyk	66	71	74	89
Khimik	67	64	67	81

Third place
Dnipro	91	77	81	83	92
Cherkaski Mavpy	77	82	83	69	75

== Ukrainian clubs in European competitions ==
Team	Competition	Progress
BC Khimik	Champions League	Regular season
