= Basketball Federation of Ukraine =

Sports governing body in Ukraine

- Founded: 1992; 34 years ago
- Affiliation: FIBA Europe
- Headquarters: Kyiv
- President: Mykhailo Brodskyi

Official website
- fbu.ua

The Basketball Federation of Ukraine (Ukrainian: Федерація баскетболу України, romanized: Federatsiia basketbolu Ukrainy) also known as FBU is the governing body of basketball in Ukraine. The federation was established and joined FIBA in 1992, after the dissolution of the Soviet Union. They are headquartered in Kyiv.

The Basketball Federation of Ukraine operates the Ukraine men's national team and Ukraine women's national team. They organize national competitions in Ukraine, for both the men's and women's senior teams and also the youth national basketball teams.

The top professional league in Ukraine is the Ukrainian Basketball SuperLeague.

== See also ==
- Ukraine men's national basketball team
- Ukraine men's national under-20 basketball team
- Ukraine men's national under-18 basketball team
- Ukraine men's national under-16 basketball team
- Ukraine men's national 3x3 team
- Ukraine women's national basketball team
- Ukraine women's national under-20 basketball team
- Ukraine women's national under-18 basketball team
- Ukraine women's national under-16 basketball team
- Ukraine women's national 3x3 team
