= BIPA Odesa =

Professional basketball club based in Odesa, Ukraine

- Leagues: Ukrainian Basketball SuperLeague
- Founded: 2015
- History: BIPA Odesa; 2015–2018; Dynamo Odesa; 2018–2019; BIPA Odesa; 2019–present
- Arena: Palace of Sports
- Capacity: 3,000
- Location: Odesa, Ukraine
- Team colors: Yellow, Blue
- Website: bipa.com.ua
Home	Away

BIPA Odesa (Ukrainian: БІПА Одеса) is a professional basketball club based in Odesa, Ukraine. In the 2015–16 season, the team entered the Ukrainian Basketball SuperLeague, the top tier league in Ukraine. In December 2017, BIPA Odesa went under the ownership of BC Dynamo Odesa, but completed the 2017-2018 season under the name "BIPA". BC Dynamo Odesa was promoted to the Superleague for the season 2018-2019. BIPA and BC Dynamo merged and changed name to BC Odesa.

However, refounded BIPA Odesa started to play in lower divisions. In 2020-21 season, club won Higher League of Ukraine (second division). In 2022-23 season team merged with BC Khimik and began to play in Superleague under the war circumstances.

== Season by season ==
Season	Tier	League	Pos.	Ukrainian Cup	European competitions
2015–16	1	SL Favorit Sport	7th	Quarterfinalist	
2016–17	1	SuperLeague	5th	Semifinalist	
2017–18	1	SuperLeague	6th	Semifinalist	
