= BC Kyiv-Basket =

Ukrainian professional basketball team based in Kyiv

Kyiv-Basket
- Nickname: The Bees (Ukrainian: Бджоли)
- Leagues: Ukrainian Basketball SuperLeague
- Founded: 1992 (reestablished in 2017)
- Dissolved: 1998
- History: List: Maccabi-Dandy 1992–1993 Kyiv-Basket 1993–1996 Dandy-Basket 1996–1998 Kyiv-Basket 2017–present
- Arena: Palace of Sports
- Capacity: 7,000
- Location: Kyiv, Ukraine
- Website: https://kyiv-basket.com.ua
Home	Away

Kyiv-Basket (Ukrainian: Київ-Баскет) is a Ukrainian professional basketball club based in Kyiv. Originally founded in 1992 and refounded in 2017, the team plays in the Ukrainian Basketball SuperLeague (UBL). The re-established club made its debut in the Ukrainian Basketball SuperLeague in the 2018–19 season. It replaced the previous club from Kyiv in the UBL, Budivelnyk.

== History ==
The club was founded in 1992 as Maccabi-Dandy (Ukrainian: Маккабі-Денді) by politician and businessman Mykhailo Brodskyy. The team won several trophies in Ukraine. In 1998, the team ceased to exist because of the financial problems.

In November 2017, the club had a revival as a new team was established. The new logo of the team, featuring a bee, was revealed while it was announced that the club would have a women's team and two men's team in the 2017–18 season. The new home arena of the team was the Meridian Sports Complex.

In the 2018–19 season, Kyiv-Basket finished as runners-up as it was defeated by Khimik in the finals, 0–3. Currently the team sits in second place in the UBL and 1st in the second stage of Fiba Europe Cup

== Honors ==
Honors of Kyiv-Basket
League	Result	Years
Ukrainian SuperLeague	(gold) Champions	–
Ukrainian SuperLeague	(silver) Runners-up	4 (1994, 1995, 2019, 2020)
Ukrainian SuperLeague	(bronze) Third place	2 (1996, 1997)

== Arenas ==
Arenas
Arena	Capacity	Tenure
Palace of Sports	7,000	1992–1998
Palace of Sports	7,000	2018–present
Meridian Sports Complex	1,500	2017–2018

== Season by season ==
Playoff berth

Season	Tier	League	Finish	Wins	Losses	Win%	Playoffs	Other competitions	Head coach
Kyiv-Basket
2018–19	1	SuperLeague	4th	15	13	.536	Won quarterfinals (Mykolaiv), 2–1; Won semifinals (Zaporizhya), 2–1; Lost finals (Khimik), 0–3	–	
2019–20	1	SuperLeague	2nd	17	6		–	2019–20 FIBA Europe Cup; Lost quarterfinals (Pınar Karşıyaka), 0–2	Ainars Bagatskis

== Coaches ==
- (Latvia) Ainars Bagatskis
- (Ukraine) Alexander Lokhmanchuk
- (Ukraine) Yevgen Murzin

== Notable players ==
- (United States) Maurice Creek
- (United States) Greg Mangano
- (United States) Brandon Young
- (Ukraine) Maksym Lutsenko
- (Ukraine) Dmytro Skapintsev
- (Senegal) Malik Dime
