= BC Cherkaski Mavpy =

Cherkaski Mavpy
- Leagues: Ukrainian SuperLeague
- Founded: 2003; 23 years ago
- History: Cherkaski Mavpy (2003–present)
- Arena: Sportpalace Budivelnyk
- Capacity: 1,500
- Location: Cherkasy, Ukraine
- Team colors: Orange, Black
- Championships: 1 Ukrainian championship 1 Ukrainian Cup; 2 Higher League
Home	Away

Cherkaski Mavpy (Ukrainian: Черкаські Мавпи, lit. 'Cherkasy Apes') is a Ukrainian professional basketball club that plays its home games in Cherkasy.

In the 2007 NBA draft, Cherkaski Mavpy center Kyrylo Fesenko was selected 38th by the Philadelphia 76ers, who then traded his rights to the Utah Jazz. In 2017, Cherkasi played at the Houssam el Din Hariri Tournament, and finished as finalist after losing to Riyadi Beirut. In 2018, Cherkasi won its first SuperLeague championship.

== Honours ==
Ukrainian Basketball SuperLeague

- Champions (1): 2017–18

== Season by season ==
Season	Tier	League	Pos.	Ukrainian Cup	European competitions	
2004–05	2	Higher League	2nd			
2005–06	1	SuperLeague	4th			
2006–07	1	SuperLeague	4th		4 FIBA EuroCup Challenge	QF
2007–08	1	SuperLeague	7th		3 FIBA EuroCup	RS
2008–09	1	UBL	4th			
2009–10	2	Higher League	1st			
2010–11	2	Higher League	1st	Champion		
2011–12	1	SuperLeague	13th			
2012–13	1	SuperLeague	7th			
2013–14	1	SuperLeague	11th			
2014–15	1	SuperLeague	6th	Quarterfinalist		
2015–16	1	SL Favorit Sport	4th	Semifinalist		
2016–17	1	SuperLeague	4th	Quarterfinalist		
2017–18	1	SuperLeague	1st	Quarterfinalist		
2018–19	1	SuperLeague	8th	Round of 16	4 FIBA Europe Cup	RS
2019–20	1	SuperLeague	6th	Quarterfinalist		
2020–21	1	SuperLeague	9th	Finalist		

== European record ==
Season	Competition	Round	Club	Home	Away	Agg
2018–19	FIBA Europe Cup	QR1	(Norway) Kongsberg Miners	101–90	83–63	184–153
2018–19	FIBA Europe Cup	QR2	(Cyprus) Keravnos	75–64	61–64	136–128
2018–19	FIBA Europe Cup	RS	(Denmark) Bakken Bears	77–106	89–121	3rd place
2018–19	FIBA Europe Cup	RS	(Kosovo) Prishtina	73–92	82–92	3rd place
2018–19	FIBA Europe Cup	RS	(Romania) Steaua Bucharest	90–64	70–87	3rd place

Notes

1. Cherkaski Mavpy points are listed first.

== Players ==
=== Current squad ===
Cherkaski Mavpy roster
Players
Coaches

Pos.	No.	Nat.	Name	Ht.	Wt.	Age
G	22	(United States)	Williams, Aaron Pervis	1.98 m (6 ft 6 in)	93 kg (205 lb)	34 – 9 November 1991
SG	3	(Ukraine)	Kolchenko, Oleksandr (C)	1.95 m (6 ft 5 in)	101 kg (223 lb)	37 – 20 September 1988
C	4	(Ukraine)	Skapintsev, Dmytro	2.06 m (6 ft 9 in)	78 kg (172 lb)	28 – 12 May 1998
F	5	(Ukraine)	Tkachenko, Ivan	1.97 m (6 ft 6 in)	78 kg (172 lb)	29 – 23 April 1997
SG	6	(Ukraine)	Voievoda, Nikita	1.84 m (6 ft 0 in)	76 kg (168 lb)	29 – 6 November 1996
PG	8	(Ukraine)	Ruslov, Nikita	1.94 m (6 ft 4 in)	94 kg (207 lb)	29 – 23 October 1996
PF	13	(Ukraine)	Belikov, Oleksandr	2.00 m (6 ft 7 in)	88 kg (194 lb)	34 – 31 May 1992
PF	14	(Bosnia and Herzegovina)	Hadžifejzović, Sead	2.02 m (6 ft 8 in)	101 kg (223 lb)	37 – 3 April 1989
SG	15	(Ukraine)	Nahornyi, Dmytro	1.85 m (6 ft 1 in)	72 kg (159 lb)	26 – 1 September 1999
SG	16	(Ukraine)	Bondarenko, Oleh	1.91 m (6 ft 3 in)	94 kg (207 lb)	26 – 16 December 1999
PF	21	(United States)	Wright, Dion	2.01 m (6 ft 7 in)	100 kg (220 lb)	33 – 18 February 1993
SG	23	(Ukraine)	Popov, Serhii	1.96 m (6 ft 5 in)	94 kg (207 lb)	38 – 27 February 1988
SF	24	(Ukraine)	Konev, Vladimir	2.03 m (6 ft 8 in)	85 kg (187 lb)	37 – 18 June 1989
C	31	(Ukraine)	Serheiev, Ihor	2.07 m (6 ft 9 in)	85 kg (187 lb)	24 – 4 August 2001
SG		(United States)	Young, Cameron	1.98 m (6 ft 6 in)	93 kg (205 lb)	30 – 24 March 1996

Head coach

- (Ukraine) Maksym Mikhelson

Athletic trainer(s)
Doctor
Manager

Legend

- (C) Team captain
- Injured

- Roster
Updated: 24 February 2020

== Notable players ==
Note: Flags indicate national team eligibility at FIBA-sanctioned events. Players may hold other non-FIBA nationalities not displayed.

Criteria

To appear in this section a player must have either:

- Set a club record or won an individual award while at the club
- Played at least one official international match for their national team at any time
- Played at least one official NBA match at any time.

- (Lebanon) Fadi El Khatib
- (Ukraine) Kyrylo Fesenko 1 season: 2006–07
- (Lithuania) Tomas Delininkaitis 1 season: 2012–13
- (Ukraine) Sviatoslav Mykhailiuk 2 seasons: 2012–14
- (Ukraine) Dmytro Skapintsev 6 seasons: 2015–21

== See also ==
- FC Cherkashchyna
