= SC Kryvbas =

Professional basketball club from Kryvyi Rih, Ukraine

- Leagues: Ukrainian Basketball SuperLeague
- Founded: 2000
- History: BC Basket Kryvyi Rih (2000–2002); Kryvbasbasket (2002–2009); SC Kryvbas (2009–2017); BC Kryvbas (since 2021)
- Arena: KTU Sports Complex
- Capacity: 1,300
- Location: Kryvyi Rih, Ukraine
- Team colors: Red, Black, White
- Championships: 1 UBL; 2 Higher Leagues

BC Kryvbas (Ukrainian: Спортивний клуб Кривбас), is a professional basketball club based in Kryvyi Rih, Ukraine.

Achievements of the team were winning the Ukrainian Basketball League in 2009, and winning the Higher League in 2003 and 2004.

Kryvbas withdrew from the 2016–17 Ukrainian Basketball SuperLeague in January 2017.

== Names ==
- 2000–2002: BC Basket Kryvyi Rih
- 2002–2009: BC Kryvbasbasket
- 2009–2017: SC Kryvbas
- Since 2021: BC Kryvbas

== Honors ==
- Ukrainian Super League

Champions (1): 2008–09

- Higher League

Winners (2): 2002–03, 2003–04

- Ukrainian Cup

Runners-up (1): 2016

== Players ==
=== Notable players ===
Note: Flags indicate national team eligibility at FIBA-sanctioned events. Players may hold other non-FIBA nationalities not displayed.

Criteria

To appear in this section a player must have either:

- Set a club record or won an individual award while at the club
- Played at least one official international match for their national team at any time
- Played at least one official NBA match at any time.

- (Bulgaria) Darius Adams
