= BC Khimik =

Coordinates: 46°37′15″N 31°06′00″E

- Leagues: Ukrainian Basketball SuperLeague
- Founded: 2001; 24 years ago
- History: BC Khimik (2001–present)
- Arena: Sportzentrum Olymp
- Capacity: 2,000
- Location: Pivdenne, Ukraine
- Team colors: Green, White
- Championships: 3 Ukrainian Championships; 1 Ukrainian Cup
- SuperLeague titles: 3 (2015, 2016, 2019)
- Website: khimik.com.ua
Home	Away

Khimik Yuzhne (Ukrainian: Хімік Южне) is a Ukrainian professional basketball club that is based in Pivdenne. The club plays in the Ukrainian Basketball SuperLeague. In 2006, the club reached the final of the EuroCup Challenge, where they were defeated by Ural Great Perm.

== History ==
The team was founded in 2001 as BC Khimik. In the first season of the club, the team immediately finished in fourth place in the Ukrainian Basketball SuperLeague. In the 2014–15 season, Khimik won its first national championship after going undefeated in the entire season. In the regular season, Khimik finished 30–0 and in the Playoffs the team won all its six games. In 2016, Khimik repeated as national champions - winning the Ukrainian SL Favorit Sport (one of the two Ukrainian top tier basketball leagues).

In the 2018–19 season, Khimik won its third domestic championship.

== Trophies ==
- Ukrainian Championship

Winners (3): 2014–15, 2015–16 (Note: In the 2015–16 season, two top-tier Ukrainian Leagues were organized. Khimik won the Ukrainian SL Favorit Sport.), 2018–19

- Ukrainian Cup

Winners (1): 2015–16

== Season by season ==
Season	Tier	League	Pos.	Ukrainian Cup	European competitions	
2007–08	1	SuperLeague	3rd		3 EuroCup	QF
2008–09	1	SuperLeague	4th	Semifinalist	3 EuroChallenge	RS
2009–10	1	SuperLeague	10th		3 EuroChallenge	RS
2010–11	1	SuperLeague	12th		3 EuroChallenge	RS
2011–12	1	SuperLeague	5th	Semifinalist	3 EuroChallenge	RS
2012–13	1	SuperLeague	5th		3 EuroChallenge	QF
2013–14	1	SuperLeague	2nd		2 Eurocup	EF
2014–15	1	SuperLeague	1st	Semifinalist		
2015–16	1	SL Favorit Sport	1st	Champion	3 FIBA Europe Cup	QF
2016–17	1	SuperLeague	2nd	Semifinalist	3 Champions League	RS
2017–18	1	SuperLeague	3rd	Runner-up	4 FIBA Europe Cup	RS
2018–19	1	SuperLeague	1st	Quarterfinalist		

== Notable players ==
Note: Flags indicate national team eligibility at FIBA-sanctioned events. Players may hold other non-FIBA nationalities not displayed.

Criteria

To appear in this section a player must have either:

- Set a club record or won an individual award while at the club
- Played at least one official international match for their national team at any time
- Played at least one official NBA match at any time.

- (United States Virgin Islands) Deon Edwin (1 season: 2018–19)
- (Ukraine) Vladimir Konev (4 seasons: 2013–2017)
- (Ukraine) Artem Pustovyi (4 seasons: 2011–2015)
- (Ukraine) Ihor Zaytsev (1 season: 2014-15)
- (Ukraine) Maksym Korniyenko (1 season: 2014-15)
- (United States) Derek Needham (1 season: 2014-15)
- (United States) Jamal Shuler (1 season: 2013-14)
- (United States) Romeo Travis (1 season: 2013-14)
- (United States) Paul Delaney (1 season: 2013-14)
- (Latvia) Rolands Freimanis (1 season: 2013-14)
- (United States) Willie Deane (1 season: 2012-13)
- (United States) Vernon Goodridge (1 season: 2012-13)
- (United States) Devoe Joseph (1 season: 2012-13)
- (Serbia) Sava Lešić (1 season: 2012-13)
- (Bosnia and Herzegovina) Suad Šehović (1 season: 2012-13)
- (Bosnia and Herzegovina) Miroslav Todić (1 season: 2012-13)
- (United States) Reyshawn Terry (1 season: 2011–12)
- (United States) Aaron McGhee (1 season: 2011–12)
- (Lithuania) Arvydas Eitutavičius (1 season: 2011–12)
- (Croatia) Saša Vasiljević (1 season: 2011-12)
- (Serbia) Predrag Miletić (1 season: 2011-12)
- (Bosnia and Herzegovina) Edin Bavčić (1 season: 2010–11)
- (Lithuania) Edgaras Želionis (2 season: 2008–10)
- (Canada) Olu Famutimi (2 season: 2006–08)
- (United States) Cedric Henderson (1 season: 2006–07)
- (Ukraine) Serhiy Lishchuk (2 seasons: 2003–05)
