= Ukrainian Basketball SuperLeague =

Sports league

- Organising body: Basketball Federation of Ukraine
- Founded: 1992; 34 years ago
- First season: 1992–93
- Country: Ukraine
- Confederation: FIBA Europe
- Number of teams: 8
- Level on pyramid: 1
- Relegation to: Ukrainian Higher League
- Domestic cup: Ukrainian Cup
- International cup: Basketball Champions League
- Current champions: Dnipro (5th title) (2025–26)
- Most championships: Budivelnyk (11 titles)
- Website: fbu.ua
- 2025–26 season

The Ukrainian Basketball SuperLeague (USL) (Ukrainian: Українська баскетбольна суперліга, romanized: Ukrainska basketbolna superliha) is the first-tier level of professional basketball league in Ukraine. Established in 1992, the league is currently contested by 10 clubs. It is a tier above the Ukrainian Higher League and allows for one team from the Higher League each season to be promoted.

The league exists out of a regular season, in which team play for playoff-seeding, followed by playoffs to determine the Ukrainian champion. Budivelnyk is the most successful team in league history with 11 titles. The winners of the Superleague qualify for the qualifying rounds of the Basketball Champions League (BCL).

== Teams ==
Location of teams in the 2024–25 Ukrainian Basketball SuperLeague

=== Active teams ===
Next teams are in the competition.

Team	City	Arena	Capacity
Cherkaski Mavpy	Cherkasy	Sportpalace Budivelnyk	1,500
Dnipro	Dnipro	Sportcomplex Shynnik	5,600
Hoverla	Ivano-Frankivsk	College of Physical Education	1,500
Kryvbas	Kryvyi Rih	KTU Sports Complex	1,300
Kyiv-Basket	Kyiv	Kyiv Sports Palace	7,000
Rivne-OSHVSM	Rivne	DYSSH №4	N/A
Stariy Lutsk Universitet	Lutsk	Regional Children and Youth Sports School - Lutsk	N/A
Zaporizhzhia	Zaporizhzhia	Yunost Sport Hall	3,600

== Results by season ==
Year	Winner	Runners-up	Final score	Third place
1992	Budivelnyk	NKI Mykolaiv	Round-robin	Spartak Luhansk
1992–93	Budivelnyk	SKA Kyiv	Round-robin	NKI Mykolaiv
1993–94	Budivelnyk	Kyiv-Basket	3–0	BIPA-Moda Odesa
1994–95	Budivelnyk	Kyiv-Basket	3–0	Shakhtar-ASKO Donetsk
1995–96	Budivelnyk	Shakhtar Donetsk	Round-robin	Kyiv-Basket
1996–97	Budivelnyk	BIPA-Moda Odesa	3–2	Kyiv-Basket
1997–98	BIPA-Moda Odesa	Budivelnyk	3–0	SC Mykolaiv
1998–99	BIPA-Moda Odesa	CSKA-RIKO Kyiv	3–2	Budivelnyk
1999–00	Kyiv	MBC Odesa	3–2	CSKA-Ukrtatnafta Kyiv
2000–01	MBC Odesa	Kyiv	3–2	Azovmash
2001–02	MBC Odesa	Kyiv	3–2	Azovmash
2002–03	Azovmash	MBC Odesa	4–0	Kyiv
2003–04	Azovmash	Kyiv	4–2	MBC Odesa
2004–05	Kyiv	Azovmash	3–0	Khimik
2005–06	Azovmash	Kyiv	3–1	Khimik
2006–07	Azovmash	Kyiv	3–2	Khimik
2007–08	Azovmash	Kyiv	3–1	Khimik
2008–09*	Azovmash	Donetsk	3–0	Khimik
2008–09*	Kryvbasbasket	Budivelnyk	3–2	Politekhnika-Halychyna
2009–10	Azovmash	Budivelnyk	3–2	Ferro-ZNTU
2010–11	Budivelnyk	Donetsk	4–3	Hoverla
2011–12	Donetsk	Azovmash	4–0	Ferro-ZNTU
2012–13	Budivelnyk	Azovmash	4–3	Ferro-ZNTU
2013–14	Budivelnyk	Khimik	3–1	Azovmash
2014–15	Khimik	Dnipro	3–0	Budivelnyk
2015–16*	Khimik	Dynamo	3–1	Kryvbas
2015–16*	Dnipro	Budivelnyk	3–0	Politekhnika-Halychyna
2016–17	Budivelnyk	Khimik	3–1	Dnipro
2017–18	Cherkaski Mavpy	Dnipro	3–0	Khimik
2018–19	Khimik	Kyiv-Basket	3–0	Zaporizhzhia
2019–20	Dnipro	Kyiv-Basket	—N/a	Prometey
2020–21	Prometey	Zaporizhzhia	3–0	Kyiv-Basket
2021–22	Suspended (Russian invasion of Ukraine)			
2022–23	Budivelnyk	BIPA Odesa	Round-robin	Dnipro
2023–24	Dnipro	Rivne-OSHVSM	2–0	Kyiv-Basket
2024–25	Dnipro	Kyiv-Basket	2–1	Cherkaski Mavpy
2025–26	Dnipro	Kyiv-Basket	2–0	Rivne-OSHVSM

- Note, there were two different leagues in the 2008–09 and 2015–16 season.
- FBU-sanctioned league seasons marked in light green. Alternative non-FBU league seasons marked in light blue.

== Performance by club ==
Club	Champions	Runners-up	Third place	Winning years
Budivelnyk	11	4	2	1992, 1992–93, 1993–94, 1994–95, 1995–96, 1996–97, 2010–11, 2012–13, 2013–14, 2016–17, 2022–23
Azovmash	7	3	3	2002–03, 2003–04, 2005–06, 2006–07, 2007–08, 2008–09 (UBSL), 2009–10
Dnipro	5	3	1	2015–16 (UBSL), 2019–20, 2023–24, 2024–25, 2025–26
Odesa / BIPA Odesa	4	3	3	1997–98, 1998–99, 2000–01, 2001–02
Khimik	3	2	6	2014–15, 2015–16 (SL), 2018–19
Kyiv	2	6	1	1999–2000, 2004–05
Donetsk	1	2	0	2011–12
Kryvbas	1	0	1	2008–09 (UBL)
Cherkaski Mavpy	1	0	1	2017–18
Prometey	1	0	1	2020–21
Kyiv-Basket	0	6	4	
CSKA Kyiv	0	2	1	
Mykolaiv	0	1	2	
Shakhtar Donetsk	0	1	1	
Dynamo Kyiv	0	1	0	
Zaporizhzhia	0	1	4	
Rivne-OSHVSM	0	1	1	
Politekhnika-Halychyna	0	0	2	
Spartak Luhansk	0	0	1	
Hoverla-Prykarpattya	0	0	1	
Total	35	35	35	

- Superleague clubs marked with light green background.
- Low division clubs marked with light yellow background.
- Defunct clubs marked with light grey background.

=== All–time national champions ===
Total number of national champions won by Ukrainian clubs. Table includes titles won during the USSR Premier Basketball League (1923–1992).

Club	Trophies	Years won
Budivelnyk	12	1988–89, 1992, 1992–93, 1993–94, 1994–95, 1995–96, 1996–97, 2010–11, 2012–13, 2013–14, 2016–17, 2022–23
Mariupol	7	2002–03, 2003–04, 2005–06, 2006–07, 2007–08, 2008–09 (UBSL), 2009–10
Dnipro	5	2015–16 (UBSL), 2019–20, 2023–24, 2024–25, 2025–26
Odesa	4	1997–98, 1998–99, 2000–01, 2001–02
Khimik	3	2014–15, 2015–16 (SL), 2018–19
Kyiv	2	1999–2000, 2004–05
Kryvbas	1	2008–09 (UBL)
Donetsk	1	2011–12
Cherkaski Mavpy	1	2017–18
Prometey	1	2020–21

== See also ==
- Ukrainian Basketball League
- Ukrainian SL Favorit Sport
- Ukrainian Basketball Cup
- Ukrainian Basketball Federation
- Ukrainian Basketball All-Star Game
