= Deaths in June 1979 =

The following is a list of notable deaths in June 1979. Entries for each day are listed alphabetically by surname. A typical entry lists information in the following sequence:

- Name, age, country of citizenship at birth, subsequent country of citizenship (if applicable), reason for notability, cause of death (if known), and reference.

== June 1979 ==
=== 1 ===
- Charles Barlow, 74, South African businessman, philanthropist and cricketer.
- John Barry, 43, English production designer (Star Wars), meningitis.
- Bruto Brivonesi, 90, Italian naval admiral.
- Ernst Brunner, 77, Swiss photographer.
- Peter Christopher Caldwell, 52, British zoologist.
- Eric Bertrand Ceadel, 58, English academic administrator.
- Vico Consorti, 76, Italian sculptor (St. Peter's Basilica Holy Doors)
- Roy Courlander, 64, British-born New Zealand soldier and Nazi collaborator.
- Andrés Domingo y Morales del Castillo, 86, Cuban jurist and politician, acting president (1954–1955).
- Werner Forssmann, 74, German physician, Nobel Prize laureate (1956), heart failure.
- Janice Holt Giles, 74, American writer.
- Ján Kadár, 61, Slovak-American filmmaker (The Shop on Main Street).
- Jose Concepcion Maristela Sr., 63, Filipino general.
- Jack Mulhall, 91, American actor, heart failure.
- Eric Partridge, 85, New Zealand-British lexicographer.
- John Hubert Penson, 86, British civil servant.
- Renny Pereira, 31, Kenyan Olympic field hockey player (1968, 1972).
- Maria Petrovykh, 71, Soviet poet.
- Hernán Vigil, 68, Chilean Olympic equestrian (1952).
- Hans Wolff, 67, German filmmaker.

=== 2 ===
- Camille Becanne, 65, French Olympic rower (1936).
- Emil Boyson, 81, Norwegian poet.
- Bob Carson, 69, American actor.
- William C. Gribble Jr., 62, American general, cancer.
- Leonard Hall, 78, American politician, member of the U.S. House of Representatives (1939–1952), complications from a stroke.
- Jim Hutton, 45, American actor (Ellery Queen), liver cancer.
- Alfred Lanzon, 62, Maltese Olympic water polo player (1936).
- Bernard Ouchard, 54, French violin bow maker.
- Joe Ryan, 77, Canadian football manager, cancer.
- Huseyn Seyidzadeh, 68, Soviet Azerbaijani film director.
- P. V. H. Weems, 90, American naval officer and maritime navigator.

=== 3 ===
- Joe Brown, 76, American baseball player.
- Bert Davie, 80, Australian cricketer.
- František Draškovič, 68, Slovak sculptor.
- John Ellis Edwards, 57, American Air Force pilot (Tuskegee Airmen)
- Frederick Mitchell, 77, Irish Anglican prelate.
- Arno Schmidt, 65, German author and translator, stroke.
- Mario Vitali, 65, Italian Olympic bobsledder (1948).

=== 4 ===
- Gilda Abreu, 74, Brazilian actress, singer and film director.
- William G. Bray, 75, American politician, member of the U.S. House of Representatives (1951–1975), stroke.
- Clarence Copithorne, 58, Canadian politician, cancer.
- Eddie Dawson, 75, English cricketer.
- Sigrid Fick, 92, Finnish-born Swedish Olympic tennis player (1912, 1920, 1924).
- James Hamilton, 4th Duke of Abercorn, 75, British politician and hereditary peer.
- Gene Leroy Hart, 35, American convicted rapist and acquitted murder suspect, heart attack.
- Jan Koželuh, 75, Czech tennis player.
- Torkil Lauritzen, 77, Danish actor.
- Hans "Frack" Mauch, 60, Swiss ice skater, heart failure.
- Seamus O'Donovan, 82, Irish republican militant (Irish Republican Army) and Nazi collaborator.
- Elena Domenica Rubeo, 82, Italian-born Australian businesswoman and community worker.
- Herman Shumlin, 80, American theatre director, heart failure.

=== 5 ===
- Karina Bell, 80, Danish actress.
- Heinz Erhardt, 70, German comedian, actor and musician.
- Antonio Francese, 79, Uruguayan politician and general.
- Morris Lazaron, 91, American rabbi and writer.
- Francis Peabody Magoun, 84, American literary scholar.
- Gustavo Re, 71, Spanish television presenter and actor.
- Vin Schleusner, 71, American football player.
- Heinrich Schulz, 85, German assassin (Matthias Erzberger).
- Geoffrey Tristram, 61, British organist and composer, heart attack.
- Sir Cecil Wakeley, 87, British surgeon.
- Cedric Whitman, 62, American poet and literary scholar.

=== 6 ===
- Jack Haley, 80, American actor (The Wizard of Oz), drummer, and comedian, complications from a heart attack.
- Ion Idriess, 89, Australian author.
- Janina Kurkowska-Spychajowa, 78, Polish archer.
- Kay Madsen, 76, Danish footballer.
- Kazimierz Opaliński, 89, Polish actor.

=== 7 ===
- Asa Earl Carter, 53, American novelist (The Rebel Outlaw: Josey Wales) and segregationist activist, choked.
- Sir William Coles, 65, British air marshal.
- James F. Donovan, 76, American businessman.
- Harold Feehan, 84, Australian footballer.
- Yehudit Harari, 93, Israeli educator and writer.
- Hans Kadelbach, 78, German Olympic sailor (1952).
- Aleksei Markushevich, 71, Soviet mathematician.
- Modesto Valle, 86, Italian footballer.

=== 8 ===
- Clarence Sinclair Bull, 83, American photographer.
- Muriel Coben, 58, Canadian baseball player.
- Sir Colin Coote, 85, British politician and journalist, MP (1917–1922).
- Reinhard Gehlen, 77, German general and intelligence officer, prostate cancer.
- Vic Harding, 26, English racing cyclist, racing crash.
- Sir Norman Hartnell, 77, English fashion designer, heart attack.
- Magnar Isaksen, 68, Norwegian footballer.
- James Nusser, 74, American actor (Gunsmoke).
- D. P. O'Connell, 54, New Zealand barrister and legal scholar.

=== 9 ===
- Georgiana Bonser, 81, British physician.
- Leif Borthen, 68, Norwegian journalist and author.
- Maria Chmurkowska, 78, Polish actress.
- Rudy Fernandez, 51, Filipino trade unionist, stroke.
- Scott Garland, 27, Canadian ice hockey player, traffic collision.
- John Morris, Baron Morris of Borth-y-Gest, 82, British jurist.
- Philip Muldoon, 82, Australian police officer and prison warden.
- Ben Navaratne, 62–63, Sri Lankan cricketer.
- Cyclone Taylor, 94, Canadian ice hockey player and civil servant.

=== 10 ===
- Aurel Baranga, 65, Romanian playwright and poet.
- Rupert Croft-Cooke, 75, English novelist.
- Henry Ginsberg, 82, American film producer (Giant), heart attack.
- Lloyd Grow, 75, American football and basketball coach.
- Frances Beatrice Taylor, 88, Canadian journalist, poet and playwright.

=== 11 ===
- Stu Aberdeen, 43, American basketball coach, heart attack.
- Jesse Abramson, 75, American sports journalist, cancer.
- Edward Almond, 86, American general.
- Jean-Louis Bory, 59, French writer, journalist and film critic, suicide.
- Nora Collyer, 81, Canadian painter.
- Alice Dalgliesh, 85, British-American author.
- Cecil J. Edmonds, 89, British colonial administrator and diplomat.
- George Eyston, 81, British engineer and racing driver.
- John Grover, 82, British general.
- Elisabeth Kadow, 73, German artist.
- Oscar Kjällander, 77, Swedish Olympic boxer (1928).
- Alfred von Martin, 96, German historian and sociologist.
- Fred Martin, 63, American baseball player, manager and scout, cancer.
- Jerry Miley, 79, American actor.
- Loren Murchison, 80, American Olympic track and field athlete (1920, 1924).
- Charles Riddy, 94, Canadian Olympic rower (1908, 1912).
- John Wayne, 72, American actor (True Grit, The Searchers) and film producer (The Alamo, Bullfighter and the Lady), stomach cancer.

=== 12 ===
- Henry Berman, 65, American film editor, cancer.
- Bill Brenzel, 69, American baseball player.
- Constant Joacim, 71, Belgian footballer.
- Ernesto Lomasti, 19, Italian mountaineer and skier, struck by lightning.
- Ferenc Nagy, 75, Hungarian politician, prime minister (1946–1947), heart attack.
- Perry L. Owsley, 64, American jurist, heart attack.
- Paek Nam-un, 85, North Korean politician.
- Mary Partington, 90, American educator and urban legend subject.
- David Sibeko, 40, South African political activist, shot.
- Sidney Smith, 89, English Assyriologist.
- Jessie Stephen, 86, British journalist, suffragist and trade unionist, pneumonia.

=== 13 ===
- Norm Chisholm, 64, Australian footballer.
- George Cisar, 66, American actor.
- Darla Hood, 47, American actress (Our Gang) and singer, heart failure.
- Anatoly Kuznetsov, 49, Soviet-British writer, heart attack.
- Jim McEwin, 80, New Zealand cricketer.
- Billy Nelson, 75, American actor and comedian.
- Barry Shear, 56, American film and television director, cancer.
- Demetrio Stratos, 34, Egyptian-born Greek-Italian singer and musician, heart attack.
- Sunshine Sue, 66, American country musician, complications from a stroke.
- Sir John Weston, 70, British air marshal.
- Arthur McCandless Wilson, 76, American historian.

=== 14 ===
- Igor Bondarevsky, 66, Soviet chess player.
- David Butler, 84, American actor, filmmaker and television director.
- Osman Hajibeyov, 72, Soviet Azerbaijani actor.
- Les Johnson, 75, Australian footballer.
- Aleksandr Morozov, 74, Soviet general.
- Toivo Pawlo, 61, Swedish actor.
- Ahmad Zahir, 33, Afghan singer and songwriter, shot.

=== 15 ===
- Alex Archer, 71, English ice hockey player.
- Juan Arremón, 80, Uruguayan footballer.
- Laurie Bird, 25, American actress and photographer, suicide by drug overdose.
- Sir Cecil Bouchier, 83, British air marshal.
- Giovanni De Prà, 78, Italian footballer.
- Leon Green, 91, American legal scholar.
- Werner Kaegi, 78, Swiss historian.
- Charlie Lee, 82, Australian footballer.
- Ernst Meister, 67, German poet and writer.
- Teruo Nakamura, 59, Taiwanese soldier, final Japanese holdout of World War II, lung cancer.
- John Porter, 57, Canadian sociologist, heart attack.
- Mel Taube, 74, American football coach.

=== 16 ===
- Ignatius Kutu Acheampong, 47, Ghanaian general and politician, head of state (1972–1978), execution by firing squad.
- Ayhan Işık, 50, Turkish actor, stroke.
- Roy C. Knapp, 87, American drummer and music educator.
- Lazar Lagin, 75, Soviet children's author.
- John Joseph Mathews, 84, American historian.
- Nicholas Ray, 67, American film director (Rebel Without a Cause, Johnny Guitar, King of Kings), heart failure.
- Telma Reca, 75, Argentine psychologist.
- Selma Steinmetz, 71, Austrian-French author and eductator, complications from surgery.
- Edward Kwaku Utuka, 42, Ghanaian general, execution by firing squad.
- Ben Weber, 62, American composer, heart attack.
- Liselotte Welskopf-Henrich, 77, German novelist.

=== 17 ===
- Sir Hubert Ashton, 81, English politician and cricketer, MP (1950–1964).
- Lou Frizzell, 59, American actor and music director, lung cancer.
- Robert E. Gerstung, 63, American soldier.
- Sir John Hathorn Hall, 84, British colonial administrator.
- Ching Johnson, 81, Canadian ice hockey player.
- Duffy Lewis, 91, American baseball player.
- Vigo Madsen, 89, Danish Olympic gymnast (1908, 1912).
- Leverett Saltonstall, 86, American politician, member of the U.S. Senate (1945–1967), governor of Massachusetts (1939–1945), heart failure.
- Rose Terlin, 70, American economist and YWCA leader, cancer.
- Tesourinha, 57, Brazilian footballer.
- Gladstone Waithe, 76–77, Barbadian cricketer.

=== 18 ===
- Gösta Brodin, 71, Swedish Olympic sailor (1948).
- Eric D'Ath, 82, New Zealand pathologist.
- Dudley S. Martin, 75, American politician.
- Moisés Moleiro, 75, Venezuelan pianist and composer.
- H. V. Morton, 86, English-South African journalist and travel writer.
- José Padilla Jr., 67, Filipino actor.
- Harry Rauch, 53, American mathematician.
- Sir Harold Richter, 73, Australian politician.
- Hal Trosky, 66, American baseball player, heart attack.
- Rodolfo Usigli, 73, Mexican playwright and essayist, heart attack.

=== 19 ===
- Nick Grinde, 86, American filmmaker.
- Franz Polgar, 79, Hungarian-American hypnotist, brain cancer.
- Paul Popenoe, 90, American marriage counselor and eugenicist.
- Ivan Stranski, 82, Bulgarian chemist.

=== 20 ===
- Gottlieb Ababio Adom, 74, Ghanaian journalist and educator.
- Bill Buckler, 78, American football player.
- Sir Harry George Champion, 87, British geographer.
- Robert Howe, 75, Scottish footballer.
- Karl Retzlaw, 83, German politician.
- Robin Samsoe, 12, American murder victim.
- Bill Stewart, 37, American journalist, shot.
- Aenne Willkomm, 77, German costume designer (Metropolis).
- Yisrael Yeshayahu, 71, Yemeni-born Israeli politician, MK (1951–1977), cancer.

=== 21 ===
- Harry Boyes, 71, South African cricketer.
- Anthony Chenevix-Trench, 60, British educator, complications during intestinal surgery.
- Elias IV of Antioch, 65, Syrian Greek Orthodox prelate, patriarch of Antioch (since 1970), heart attack.
- Mykhailo Hrechyna, 77, Soviet Ukrainian architect.
- Arnold Lundgren, 80, Danish Olympic cyclist (1920).
- Angus MacLise, 41, American drummer (The Velvet Underground), hypoglycemia.
- Curt Masreliez, 59, Swedish actor.
- David McCulloch, 66, Scottish footballer.
- Julian Orchard, 49, English actor (Carry On).
- Pedro Pérez de Guzmán, 78, Spanish politician and footballer.

=== 22 ===
- Gilbert Smithson Adair, 82, English biochemist.
- Troy Archer, 24, American football player, traffic collision.
- Louis Chiron, 79, Monegasque racing driver.
- Nittatsu Hosoi, 77, Japanese Buddhist monk.
- Pee Wee Hunt, 72, American bandleader and trombonist.
- Wiard Ihnen, 81, American art director, cancer.
- Berthold Müller-Oerlinghausen, 86, German sculptor.
- Harry Norris, 91, New Zealand-born British conductor.
- Emory Parnell, 86, American actor.
- Karl Pilß, 77, Austrian pianist and composer.
- Paul Smart, 87, American Olympic sailor (1948).
- Hope Summers, 77, American actress (The Andy Griffith Show).

=== 23 ===
- Marcelle Louise Fernande Le Gal, 84, French mycologist.
- Reynolds Stone, 70, English engraver.

=== 24 ===
- John Lyon Collyer, 85, American businessman.
- Grace Fortescue, 95, American socialite.
- P. K. Kunju, 72–73, Indian politician.
- István Örkény, 67, Hungarian playwright and novelist, heart failure.
- Lessing J. Rosenwald, 88, American businessman and philanthropist, pneumonia.
- P. B. A. Saleh, 50, Indian footballer, heart attack.

=== 25 ===
- Ewa Bandrowska-Turska, 85, Polish singer and music educator.
- Dave Fleischer, 84, American film director and producer (Fleischer Studios), stroke.
- Philippe Halsman, 73, Russian-American photographer.
- William O. Steele, 61, American author.
- Martinus Stenseth, 89, American general.
- J. Millard Tawes, 85, American politician, governor of Maryland (1959–1967), heart attack.
- Lillian Eichler Watson, 78, American author and advertising copywriter.

=== 26 ===
- Nau Cherrington, 55, New Zealand rugby player.
- Afrânio da Costa, 87, Brazilian Olympic sport shooter (1920).
- Arthur G. Dorland, 91, Canadian historian.
- Franz-Josef Röder, 69, German politician.
- Sam Yuchtman, 69, Polish-born Canadian broadcaster and singer.
- Notable Ghanaians executed by firing squad:
  - Akwasi Afrifa, 43, politician and general, head of state (1969–1970)
  - Fred Akuffo, 42, politician, head of state (1978–1979)
  - Joy Amedume, naval admiral
  - George Boakye, 41, air marshal
  - Roger Joseph Felli, 38, politician and diplomat
  - Robert Kotei, 43, politician and general

=== 27 ===
- Ludovico Arroyo Bañas, 78, Filipino communications administrator.
- Bruno Beran, 91, Czech painter.
- Theodore Menline Bernstein, 74, American journalist, cancer.
- Alan C. Burton, 75, English-born Canadian physicist.
- Antoni Gołubiew, 72, Polish historian.
- Nikolai Kabak, 75, Soviet soldier.
- Pat Maloney, 91, American baseball player.
- Sir Thomas William Meagher, 77, Australian physician and politician.
- Bande Ali Mia, 73, Bangladeshi author and poet.
- Eric Snowden, 90, English-born American actor.
- Sir Arthur Tyndall, 88, New Zealand engineer and jurist.

=== 28 ===
- Luis Aguirrebeña, 63, Chilean Olympic water polo player (1948).
- Holless Wilbur Allen, 69, American bowyer and inventor (compound bow), traffic collision.
- Joachim Alva, 72, Indian journalist and politician, MP, Lok Sabha (1952–1967) and MP, Rajya Sabha (1968–1974).
- Bruce Barclay, 56, New Zealand politician, MP (since 1969), cancer.
- Ilse Braun, 70, German secretary, sister of Eva Braun, cancer.
- Clarence H. Cobbs, 71, American broadcaster and clergyman.
- Philippe Cousteau, 38, French diver, oceanographer and cinematographer, seaplane crash.
- Paul Dessau, 84, German composer and conductor.
- Edgar Hayes, 77, American jazz pianist and bandleader.
- Mary Kahil, 90, Egyptian feminist and Christian mystic.
- Natan Rakhlin, 73, Soviet Ukrainian conductor.
- Reginald H. Ridgely Jr., 76, American general, cardiac arrest.
- Oleksa Shatkivsky, 71, Soviet Ukrainian painter.

=== 29 ===
- Ben Barnett, 71, Australian cricketer.
- Johnny Bassler, 84, American baseball player and coach.
- Kate Beath, 96, New Zealand architect.
- Sir Freddie de Guingand, 79, British general.
- Blas de Otero, 63, Spanish poet.
- Lowell George, 34, American musician (Little Feat), heroin-induced heart attack.
- Russell Kimball, 75, American art director.
- Sir Norman Kipping, 78, British electrical engineer and businessman.
- Peo Charles Koller, 78, Hungarian cytologist.
- Valeriy Kopayev, 24, Soviet Olympic skier (1976).
- Augusto Mijares, 81, Venezuelan historian, journalist and diplomat.
- Alfie Moore, 74, Canadian ice hockey player.
- Vilho Niittymaa, 82, Finnish Olympic discus thrower (1924).
- Madeleine Orr, 64, Australian-born English actress, cancer.
- Jane Rose, 66, American actress (Phyllis), cancer.
- Walter Ulfig, 77, German composer.
- Steamboat Williams, 87, American baseball player.

=== 30 ===
- William B. Franke, 85, American businessman and government official, secretary of the Navy (1959–1961), complications from gallbladder surgery.
- Hugh Garner, 66, English-born Canadian novelist.
- Eddie Grant, 50, Scottish footballer.
- Carl Leavitt Hubbs, 84, American ichthyologist, cancer.
- Jim Southee, 77, Australian politician.
- Chris Taylor, 29, American Olympic wrestler (1972), heart disease.
- M. G. Vijayasarathi, 72, Indian cricket umpire.
