= Harold Raynsford Stark =

American admiral, 8th US Chief of Naval Operations (1880–1972)

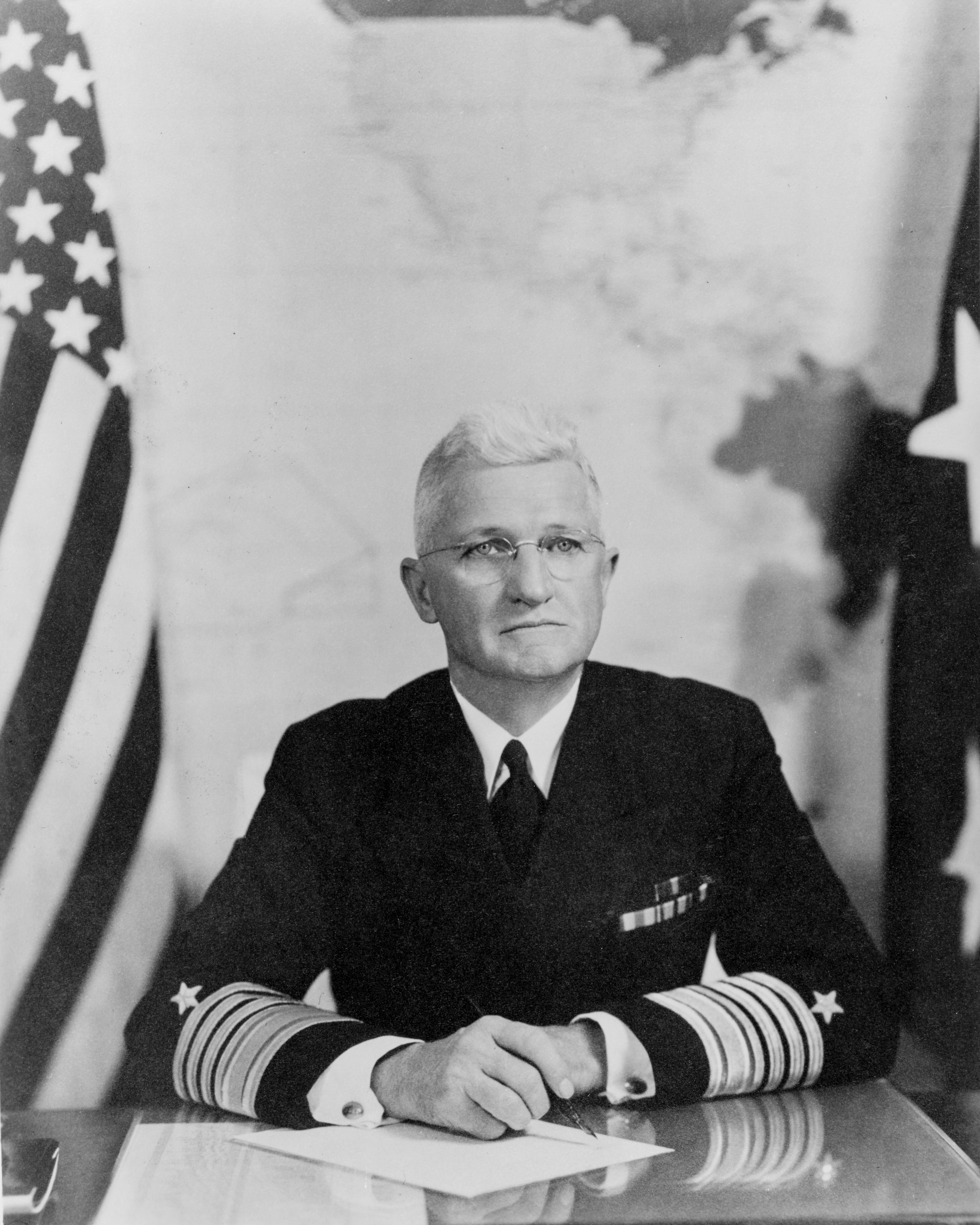
- Born: November 12, 1880; Wilkes-Barre, Pennsylvania, US
- Died: August 20, 1972 (aged 91); Washington, D.C., US
- Burial place: Arlington National Cemetery, Virginia, US
- Military career
- Branch: United States Navy
- Service years: 1899–1946
- Rank: Admiral
- Nickname: "Betty"
- Commands: United States Twelfth Fleet; United States Naval Forces Europe; Chief of Naval Operations; Cruisers of Battle Fleet; Cruiser Division Three; USS West Virginia; USS Nitro
- Conflicts: World War I World War II
- Awards: Navy Distinguished Service Medal (3); Army Distinguished Service Medal

Harold Raynsford Stark (November 12, 1880 – August 20, 1972) was an officer in the United States Navy during World War I and World War II, who served as the 8th Chief of Naval Operations from August 1, 1939, to March 26, 1942. He was relieved of that position and subsequently reassigned to serve Commander of United States Naval Forces Europe in the wake of the Japanese attack on Pearl Harbor.

== Early life and career ==
Stark was born in Wilkes‐Barre, Pennsylvania, on November 12, 1880, and enrolled in the United States Naval Academy in 1899. As a plebe he received the nickname "Betty", when upper classmen required him to place his hand over his heart and exclaim "We'll win today, or tonight Betty Stark's a widow," based on the rallying cry attributed to General John Stark during the Revolutionary War.

After his graduation in 1903 Stark served two years as a midshipman, then required by law before commissioning, before he was commissioned Ensign on February 3, 1905. He served on the battleship USS Minnesota from 1907 to 1909, before and during the United States Atlantic Fleet's cruise around the world.

During the following six years, he successively commanded the torpedo boat Stringham and the destroyers Porter, Lamson, and Patterson, and was Engineer Officer of the cruiser Brooklyn. From June 1915 to February 1917, he had shore duty at the Naval Torpedo Station in Newport, Rhode Island.

While Stark was commanding the Patterson on maneuvers near Campobello, Nova Scotia in 1914 the young Franklin D. Roosevelt, then Assistant Secretary of the Navy and an observer on board, asked to take the helm, saying he had sailed those waters since childhood. Lieutenant Stark replied "No sir. This ship is my command and I doubt your authority to relieve me," then guided the ship through the narrow channel, with rocks and shoals looming on either side, at 28 knots.

== World War I ==
Subsequently, Stark had extensive duty in torpedo boats and destroyers, including command of the Asiatic Fleet's torpedo flotilla in 1917, when these old and small destroyers steamed from the Philippines to the Mediterranean, remaining in sight of land along the way, to join in World War I operations. In November 1917 he joined the staff of Admiral William Sims, Commander, U.S. Naval Forces operating in European waters. The Italian government bestowed on him the Grade of Officer of the Order of the Crown of Italy for his World War I service; he was also awarded the Navy Distinguished Service Medal.

== Interwar years ==
Following World War I, Stark was executive officer of the battleships North Dakota and West Virginia, attended the Naval War College, commanded the ammunition ship USS Nitro from 1 December 1923 to 14 November 1925 and served in naval ordnance positions.

During the later 1920s and into the mid-1930s, with the rank of captain, Stark was successively Chief of Staff to the Commander, Destroyer Squadrons Battle Fleet, Aide to the Secretary of the Navy, and Commanding Officer of USS West Virginia. From 1934 to 1937, Rear Admiral Stark was Chief of the Bureau of Ordnance. Then from July 1938, he served at sea as Commander Cruiser Division Three and Commander of Cruisers in the Battle Fleet, with the rank of vice admiral. →

== Chief of Naval Operations ==
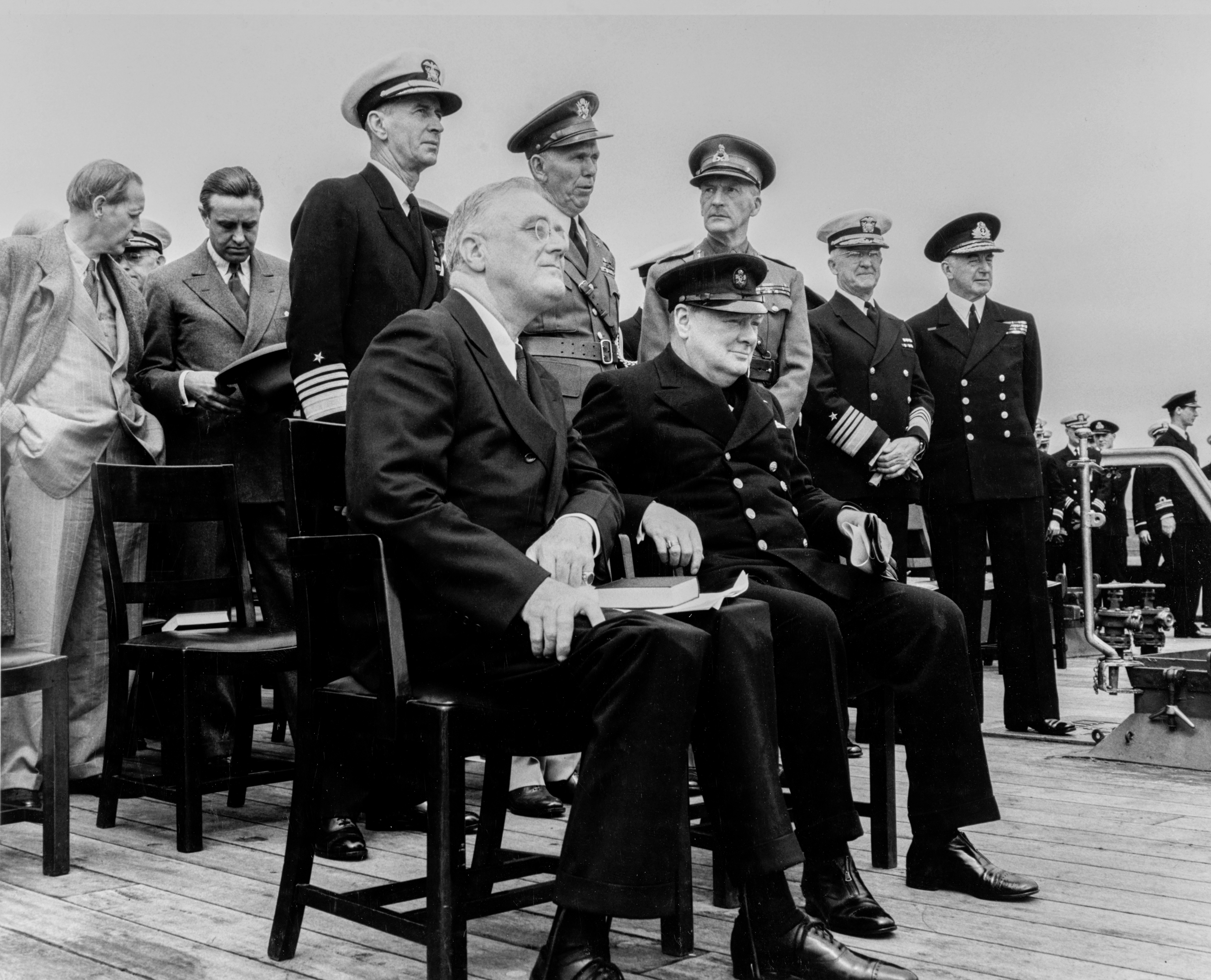
Stark (rear, 2nd from right) aboard HMS Prince of Wales at the conference that led to the Atlantic Charter.

In August 1939, Stark became Chief of Naval Operations (CNO) with the rank of admiral. In that position, he oversaw the expansion of the navy during 1940 and 1941 and its involvement in the Neutrality Patrols against German submarines in the Atlantic during the latter part of 1941. It was at this time that he authored the Plan Dog memo, which laid the basis for America's "Europe first" policy.

Following the Kearny incident in October 1941 Stark wrote, "Whether the country knows it or not, we are at war." The country was beginning to know it; Gallup registered 65% approval for U.S. intervention.

In late November 1941, as negotiations with Japan deteriorated, Stark sent warnings to Pacific naval commanders that war with Japan was increasingly likely. A 24 November message stated that a "surprise aggressive movement in any direction" was possible, while the 27 November message was explicitly described as a "war warning" and stated that an aggressive Japanese move was expected within the next few days. The latter warning identified an amphibious expedition against the Philippines, the Thai or Kra Peninsula, or Borneo as possible Japanese objectives. The 27 November warning also directed the addressees to "execute an appropriate defensive deployment preparatory to carrying out the tasks assigned in WPL-46"; under the prewar naval command structure, the CNO could issue such warnings, plans, and doctrine, but did not exercise direct operational command over the Pacific Fleet. Few officers in Washington or Hawaii regarded Pearl Harbor itself as the most likely target.

Stark remained CNO until 27 March 1942, when he was succeeded by Admiral Ernest J. King.

== After Pearl Harbor ==
The Imperial Japanese Navy launched a devastating attack on Pearl Harbor on 7 December 1941. Four hours after the attack Stark ordered the navy to carry out unrestricted submarine warfare against Japan. It appears that the decision was taken without the knowledge or prior consent of the government. It violated the London Naval Treaty, to which the United States was signatory.

Stark faced severe criticism in the aftermath of the attack on Pearl Harbor from those who claimed that he and his Director of War Plans, Admiral Richmond K. Turner, did not provide sufficient timely information to Admiral Husband E. Kimmel about Japanese moves in the fall of 1941 to enable Kimmel to anticipate an attack and to take steps to counter it. Captain (later Rear Admiral) Edwin T. Layton was Kimmel's chief intelligence officer (later also Admiral Chester W. Nimitz's intelligence officer) at the time of the attack. In his book, And I Was There: Pearl Harbor and Midway – Breaking the Secrets (1985), Layton maintained that Stark offered meaningless advice throughout the period; withheld vital information at the insistence of his Director of War Plans, Admiral Turner; showed timidity in dealing with the Japanese; and utterly failed to provide anything of use to Kimmel.

Kimmel and his Army counterpart Walter Short were removed from command and demoted in December 1941; both subsequently retired in early 1942. In March 1942, Stark was relieved as CNO by Admiral Ernest King. He went to Britain the next month to become Commander of United States Naval Forces Europe.

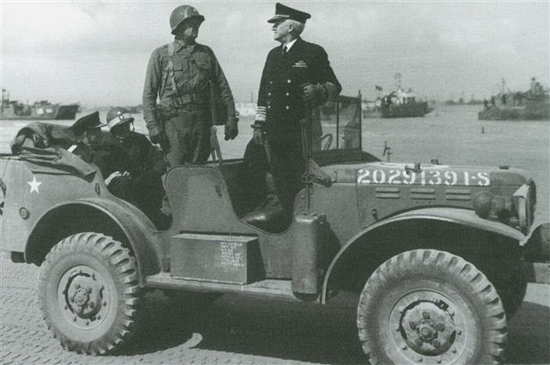
Brigadier General James E. Wharton (left), commander of the 1st Engineer Special Brigade, escorts Admiral Harold Stark on Utah Beach shortly after the D-Day landings in 1944.

From his London headquarters, Stark nominally directed the naval part of the great buildup in England and US naval operations and training activities on the European side of the Atlantic. He received the additional title of Commander of the Twelfth Fleet in October 1943, and he supervised USN participation in the landings in Normandy, France, in June 1944. Stark built and maintained close relations with British civilian and naval leaders, who "generally adored him," and also with the leaders of other Allied powers. Stark was particularly important in dealing with Charles de Gaulle; it was thanks to Stark that the US-British-Free French relationship continued to work. He earned high praise from Admiral King for his work.

After the Normandy landings, Stark faced a Court of Inquiry over his actions leading up to Pearl Harbor. The Court concluded that Stark had not conveyed the danger or provided enough information to Kimmel but that he had not been derelict. The court found that the Army and Navy had adequately cooperated in the defense of Pearl Harbor, there had been no information indicating that Japanese carriers were on their way to attack Pearl Harbor, and the attack had succeeded principally because of the aerial torpedo, a secret weapon whose use could not have been predicted.

Secretary of the Navy James Forrestal, who had ordered the 1944 Board of Inquiry, felt that the court had been too lenient in assigning blame for the disaster. Forrestal disapproved all of the court's findings and judged that Kimmel could have done more with the information he had had to prevent or mitigate the attack. Forrestal concluded that both Kimmel and Stark had "failed to demonstrate the superior judgment necessary for exercising command commensurate with their rank and their assigned duties." King's endorsement of the report was scalding, leading to Stark being relieved.

In 1948, King reconsidered and requested that the endorsement be expunged: "It was the only time that King ever admitted he had been wrong." The controversy surrounding him persisted after his death.

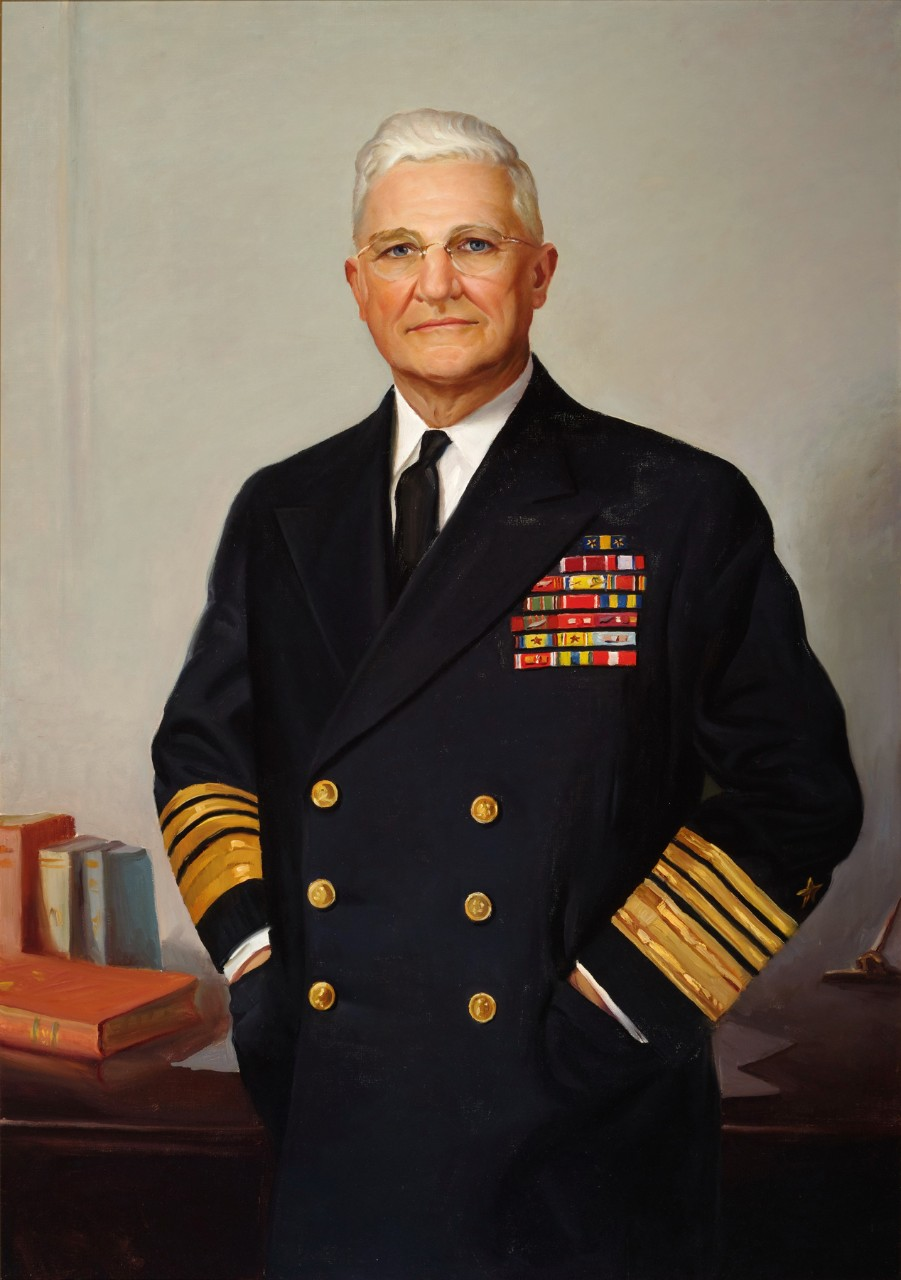
Painting by Bjorn Egeli, 1945.

Moreover, as the Supreme Commander of the Allied Powers official historian Gordon Prange and his colleagues note in December 7, 1941 (McGraw-Hill, 1988), the defense of the fleet was General Short's responsibility, not Kimmel's. Turner's insistence on having intelligence go through War Plans led Office of Naval Intelligence to a wrong belief that it was only to collect intelligence. Turner did not correct his view or aid Stark in understanding the problem. Among others, Morison and Layton agree that Turner was most responsible for the debacle, as does Ned Beach in Scapegoats (Annapolis, 1995).

In addition, there was considerable confusion over where Japan might strike: the United States, the Soviet Union, or British colonies in Asia and the Far East. John Costello (Layton's co-author), in Days of Infamy (Pocket, 1994), points out that Douglas MacArthur had complete access to both PURPLE and JN-25, with over eight hours warning, and was still caught by surprise.

== Postwar ==
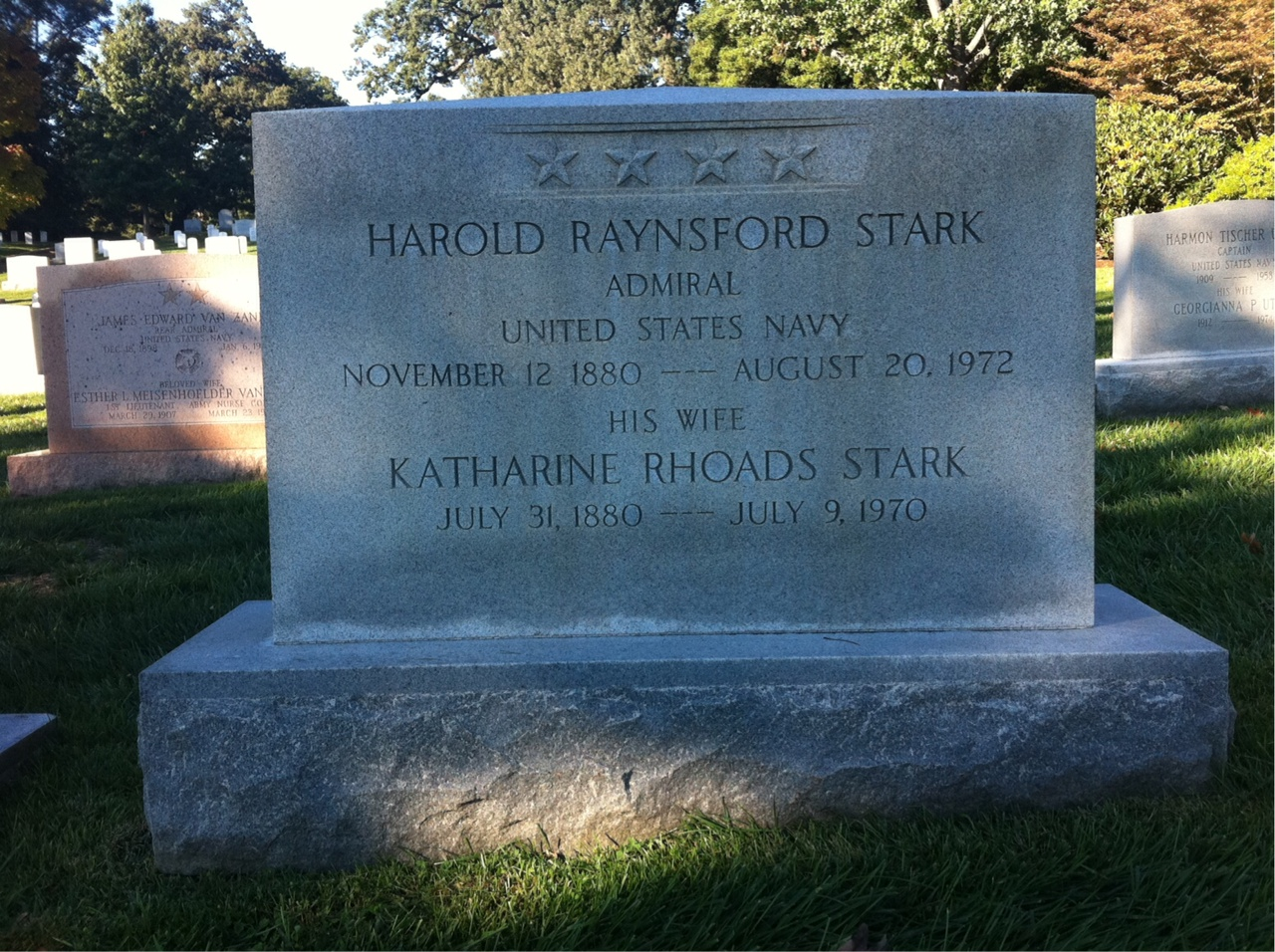
The grave of Admiral Harold R. Stark at Arlington National Cemetery.

From August 1945 until he left active duty in April 1946, Stark served in Washington, D.C., and made his home there after retirement. He died in 1972 and was buried at Arlington National Cemetery.

Stark maintained a family summer residence on Lake Carey in Pennsylvania, north of his native Wilkes-Barre, for many years and flew in by naval seaplane for weekends during his career. The cottage still stands on the western shore of the lake.

== Awards and decorations ==
Stark's known decorations included three awards of the Navy Distinguished Service Medal, the Army Distinguished Service Medal, and several foreign honours. His 1945 retirement portrait by Bjorn Egeli, held by the Naval History and Heritage Command, depicts the following ribbon rack:

Row	Ribbons, left to right	Notes
1	Navy Distinguished Service Medal	Worn with two Gold Stars, indicating three awards.
2	Army Distinguished Service Medal • Navy Expeditionary Medal	The Army decoration appears beside the Navy Expeditionary Medal.
3	Mexican Service Medal • World War I Victory Medal • American Defense Service Medal	The American Defense Service Medal is worn with the "FLEET" clasp.
4	American Campaign Medal • European-African-Middle Eastern Campaign Medal • World War II Victory Medal	The European-African-Middle Eastern Campaign Medal is worn with one battle star.
5	Honorary Knight Grand Cross of the Order of the British Empire • Commander, Legion of Honour • Croix de guerre 1939–1945	The French Croix de guerre is worn with palm.
6	Belgian Croix de Guerre • Grand Cross, Order of Orange-Nassau • Grand Collar, Order of the Southern Cross	The Belgian Croix de guerre is worn with palm; the Order of Orange-Nassau is shown with Swords.
7	Grand Cross, Order of St. Olav • Grand Cross, Order of the Sword • Officer, Order of the Crown of Italy	The Order of the Crown of Italy was awarded for Stark's World War I service.

== Dates of rank ==
Stark's promotion dates are inconsistently reported in later career summaries. Contemporary photographs, assignment records, and award citations indicate the following dates of rank or rank held by date.

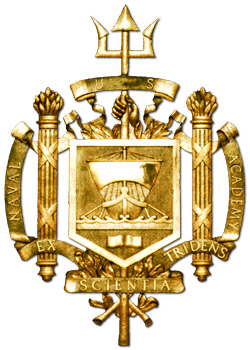
United States Naval Academy graduate, Class of 1903

Ensign	Lieutenant junior grade	Lieutenant	Lieutenant commander	Commander	Captain
O-1	O-2	O-3	O-4	O-5	O-6
2 February 1905	Never held	31 January 1907	1915	8 January 1917	December 1919

Commodore	Rear admiral	Vice admiral	Admiral	Fleet admiral
O-7	O-8	O-9	O-10	Special grade
Never held	1 November 1934	7 July 1938	1 August 1939	Never held

=== Notes ===
- Stark graduated from the United States Naval Academy in 1903 and was commissioned ensign after the then-required period of sea service as a passed midshipman.
- Stark never held the rank of lieutenant junior grade. Contemporary photographic evidence identifies him as a lieutenant by 1908, while some later career summaries give a lieutenant junior grade date for that year.
- Stark was still identified as a lieutenant in 1914, but had advanced to lieutenant commander by 1915.
- Stark was a commander by 1917. His first Navy Distinguished Service Medal citation names him as "Commander Harold Raynsford Stark" for his service commanding the Philippine Squadron of destroyers during World War I.
- Contemporary photographic evidence shows Stark wearing captain's rank by early 1920. A Getty Images catalogue entry for a Library of Congress/Corbis portrait identifies the image as Harold Raynsford Stark and dates it to 1 January 1920. A later portrait identifies him as captain and commanding officer of USS West Virginia, a billet he held from late 1933 until his promotion to rear admiral and appointment as Chief of the Bureau of Ordnance in 1934.
- Stark held the temporary rank of vice admiral as Commander, Cruisers, Battle Force, before becoming Chief of Naval Operations with the rank of admiral on 1 August 1939.

== Legacy ==
The frigate USS Stark (FFG-31) was named in honor of Stark. Stark Learning Center, a major instructional facility at Wilkes University in Wilkes-Barre, PA, was also named in his honor, as was research and development laboratory and office building at the Naval Surface Warfare Center Dahlgren Division.

Stark was portrayed by actor Edward Andrews in the 1970 film Tora! Tora! Tora!.

Military offices
Preceded by William D. Leahy	Chief of Naval Operations; 1939–1942	Succeeded by Ernest J. King
