= Kadelbach =

Kadelbach is a surname. Notable people with the surname include:

- Achim Kadelbach (born 1939), German sailor
- Hans Kadelbach (1900–1979), German sailor
- Kathrin Kadelbach (born 1983), German sports sailor
- Philipp Kadelbach (born 1974), German film and television director
