= Olympic Stadium (Kyiv) =

Stadium in Kyiv, Ukraine

Coordinates: 50°26′00″N 30°31′19″E

- UEFA
- Interactive map of Olympic Stadium
- Former names: See previous names
- Location: Velyka Vasylkivska str. 55, Kyiv, Ukraine
- Owner: Ministry of Youth and Sports of Ukraine
- Capacity: 50,000 (1941); 47,756 (1949); 100,062 (1967); 82,893 (1999); 70,050 (2011)
- Surface: Grass
- Record attendance: 102,000 (Dynamo Kyiv-Bayern Munich, 16 March 1977)
- Field size: 105 m × 68 m (344 ft × 223 ft)
- Public transit: Olimpiiska and Palats Sportu, Kyiv Metro

Construction
- Opened: 12 September 1923; 102 years ago
- Renovated: 1967, 1999, 2011
- Expanded: 1966, 1979
- Cost: ₴3,968–4,365 million
- Architects: L. I. Pilvinsky (1923); Mykhailo Hrechyna (1936–41); GMP (Germany) (2008–2011)
- General contractor: Kyivmiskbud

Tenants
- Soviet Union national football team (1969–1990); Ukraine national football team (1994–present); Dynamo Kyiv (1953–1978; 1980–2007; 2011–2022); Shakhtar Donetsk (2020–2023): Major sporting events hosted; 1980 Summer Olympic football tournament; UEFA Euro 2012; 2018 UEFA Champions League Final

Website
- nsc-olimpiyskiy.com.ua/en/

The Olympic Stadium (also known as Olimpiyskiy National Sports Complex; Ukrainian: Національний спортивний комплекс "Олімпійський", romanized: Natsionalnyi sportyvnyi kompleks "Olimpiiskyi", IPA: [nɐts⁽ʲ⁾ioˈnɑlʲnɪj sporˈtɪu̯nɪj ˈkɔmpleks ol⁽ʲ⁾imˈpijsʲkɪj]) is a multi-use sports and recreation facility in Kyiv, Ukraine, located on the slopes of the city's central Cherepanova Hora (Cherepanov Hill), Pecherskyi District. The Olympic National Sports Complex Stadium is the premier sports venue in Ukraine and the sixteenth largest venue of this type in Europe. Although it is often used by FC Dynamo Kyiv for football matches, it is technically not the football club's home stadium. Since May 2020, the stadium has also been used for the home matches of Shakhtar Donetsk due to the war in Donbas. The complex beside its stadium also features several other sports facilities and is designed to host the Olympic Games (the stadium hosted some football matches at the 1980 Summer Olympics).

Following extensive renovation, including the construction of a new roof, the stadium was reopened on 9 October 2011 with a performance by Shakira, and had its international inauguration with a 3–3 friendly draw by Ukraine against Germany on 11 November 2011. It hosted the final of the UEFA Euro 2012 and the 2018 UEFA Champions League Final.

== History ==
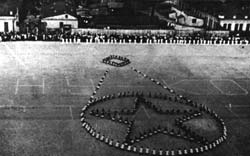
Opening of the "Red Stadium" in 1923

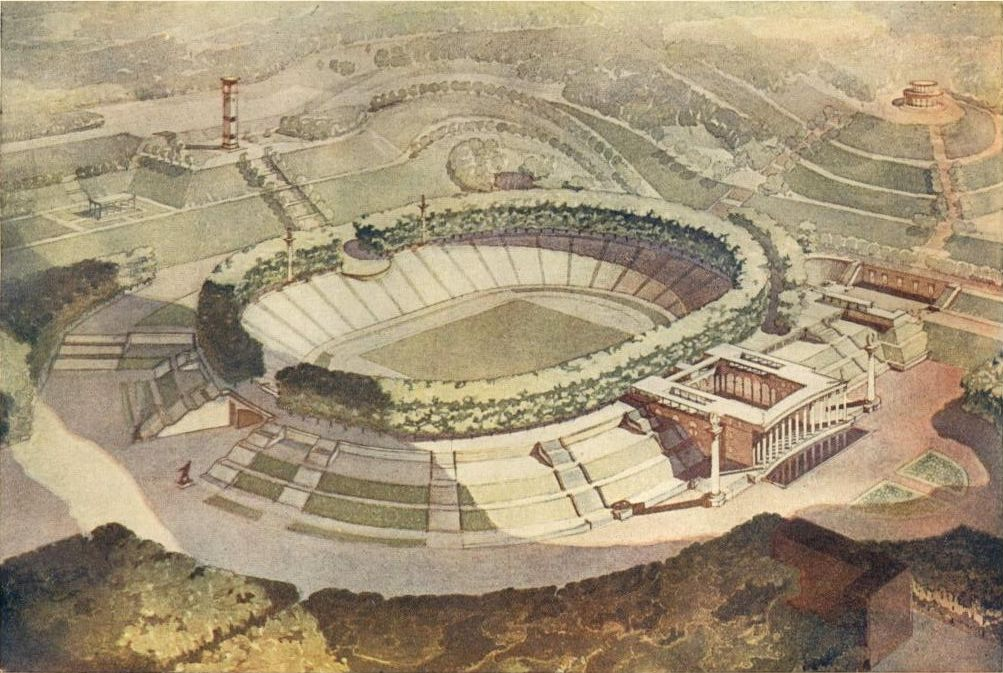
Panoramic view of the stadium on a 1930s project

Opened in 1923 as Leon Trotsky Red Stadium, the arena was built on the northwestern slopes of Cherepanova Hora hill and used remains of ruined buildings for parts of its structure. The initiative to create the stadium belonged to Lajos Gavro, at the time military commissar of Kiev Governorate. In 1924 a football field measuring 120 to 70 meters with a running track and changing rooms was established at the location. Until the construction of Dynamo Stadium, the arena remained the main football pitch in Kyiv.

Following the transfer of Ukrainian SSR's administrative capital from Kharkiv to Kyiv in 1934, the stadium was significantly expanded according to a project by architect Mykhailo Hrechyna. The opening of the new structure, decorated with a colonnade of 22 Corinthian columns and officially renamed N.S.Khrushchev Republican Stadium was scheduled for 22 June 1941, but was abandoned due to the start of the German-Soviet War on the same day.

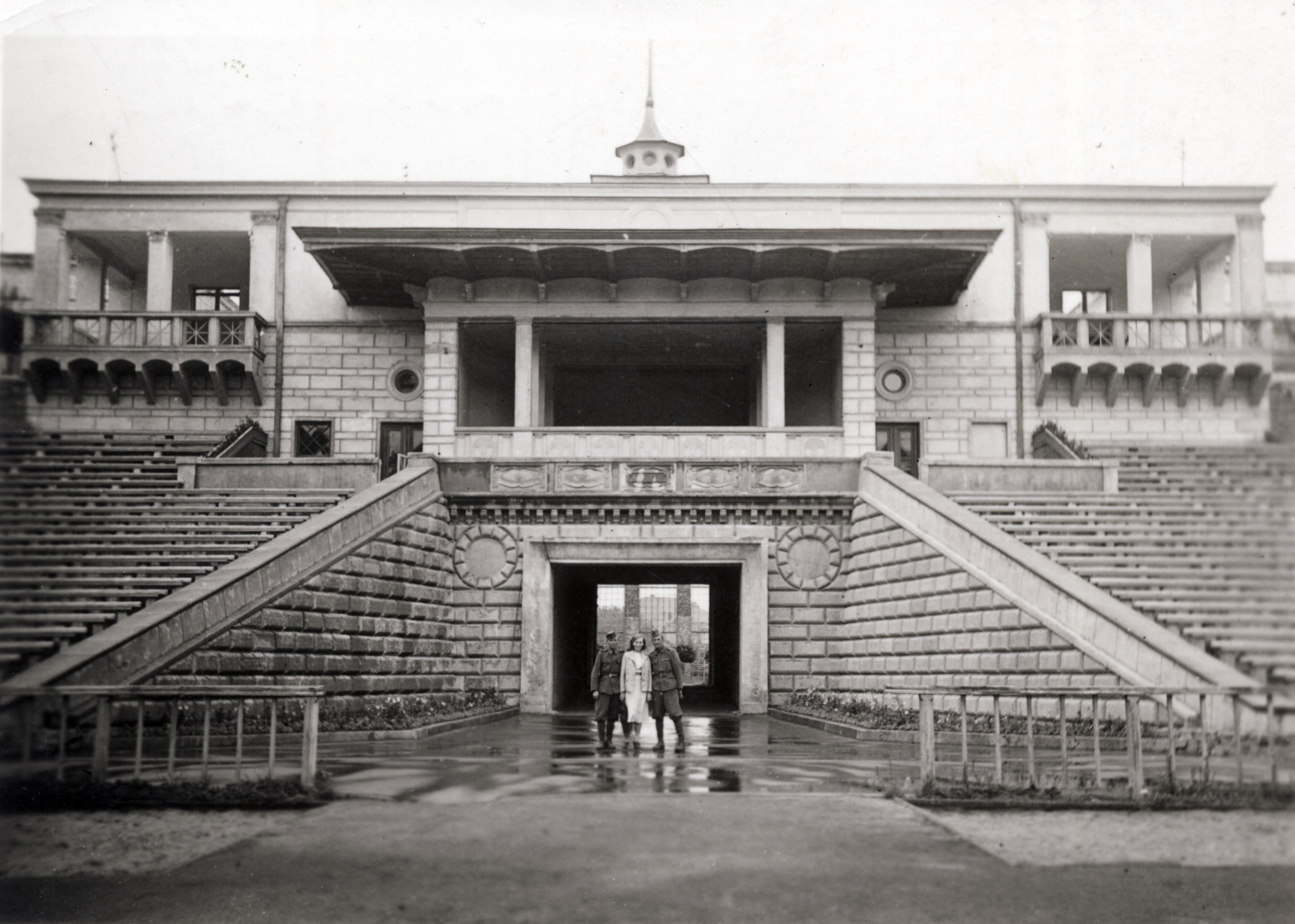
Entrance to the stadium in 1942 during the German occupation

Under German occupation the arena became known as the All-Ukrainian Stadium and reopened on 12 July 1942, hosting matches of several local and German teams. Although the stadium was never directly attacked by any of the sides, it was seriously damaged during the German retreat from Kyiv in November 1943 and could only be reopened seven months later with a football match between Dynamo Kyiv and CSKA Moscow, which had originally been scheduled for the opening of the arena back in 1941.

In the postwar years the stadium was reconstructed, receiving its first scoreboard, its entrance portal was completed, and in 1956 four 500-lux lighting masts with the height of 45 meters were installed. In October 1962 the arena became known as Central Stadium. In the next year a Hungarian-produced electronic scoreboard appeared. Another reconstruction took place from 1966, with a second tier being added to the stadium, which allowed it to host over 100,000 spectators. Specialized rooms for commentators' booths, two new electronic scoreboards and even a ski jump were added during that time.

In preparation for the 1980 Summer Olympics, after 1977 the stadium underwent another reconstruction, receiving new drainage, an Olympic cauldron, a modernized lighting system with four 82-meter masts and various additional facilities. During that period the arena once again became known as the Republican Stadium.

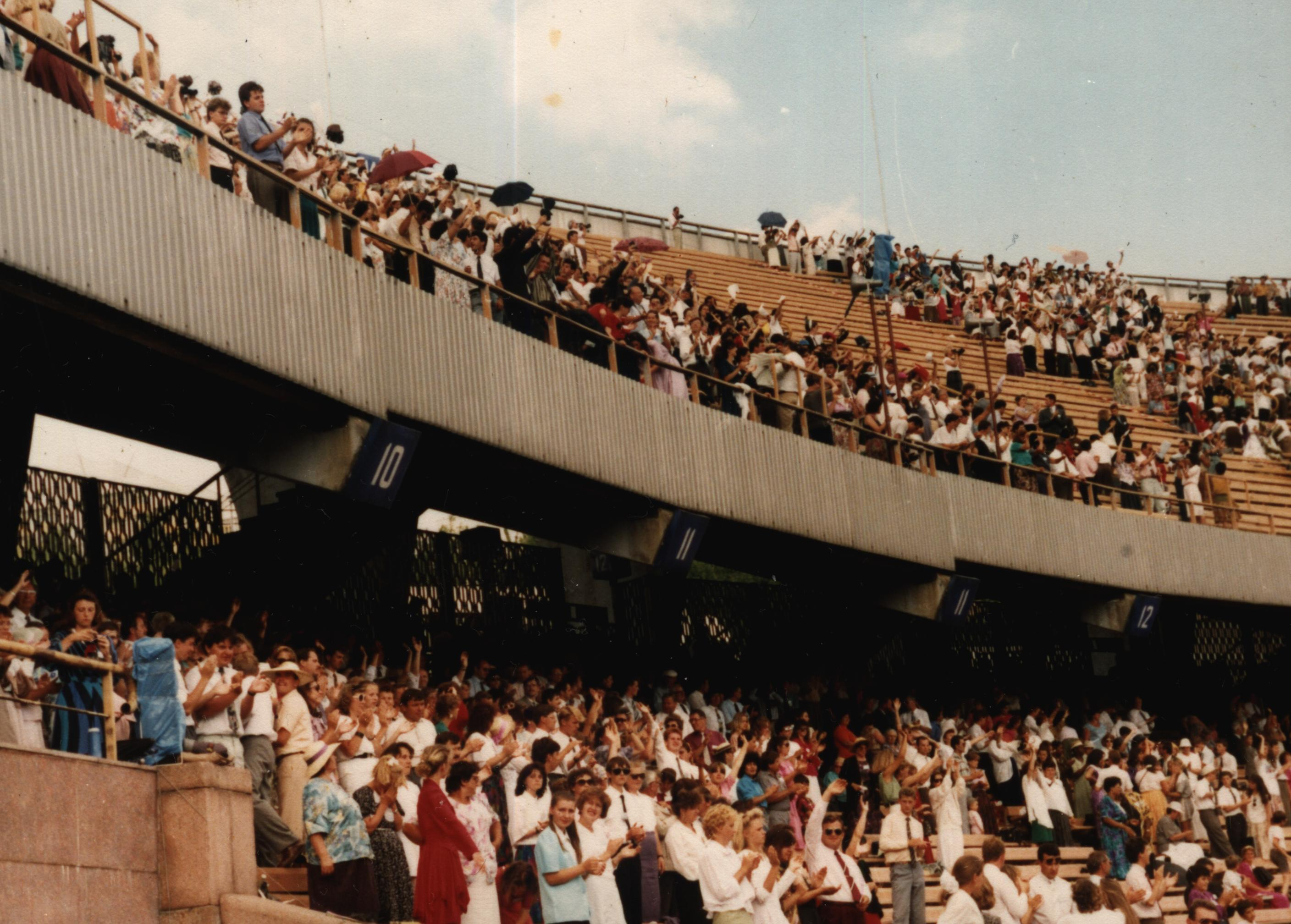
View of the stands in early 1990s

After Ukrainian independence in 1991, the stadium was given national status in 1996 and renamed again as the "Olympic" National Sports Complex. Kyivans still commonly refer to it as the Tsentralny (Central) or Respublikanskyi stadion (Republican Stadium); the nearby metro station "Olimpiiska" was also initially called "Respublikanskyi Stadion".

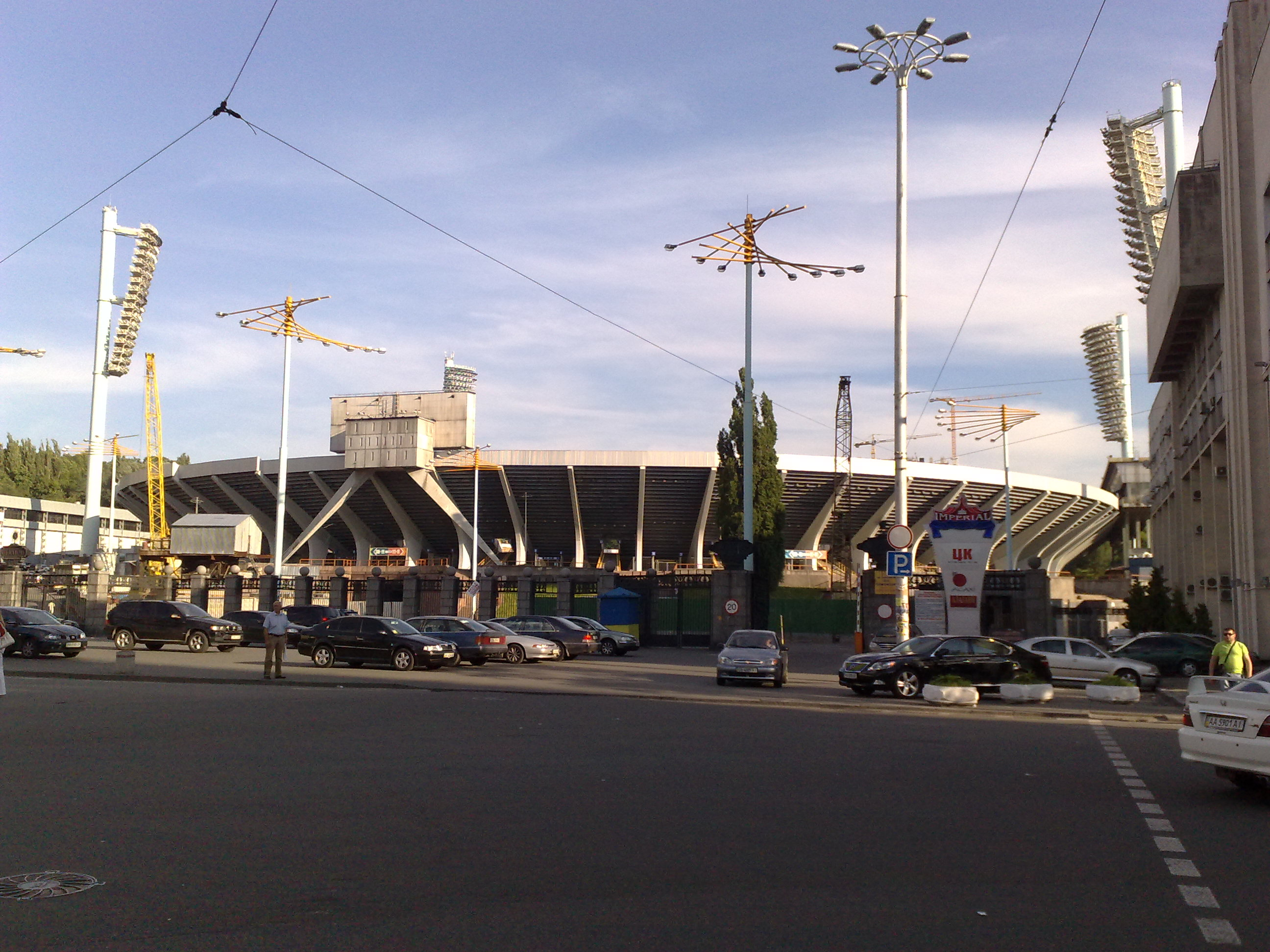
Stadium at the beginning of its latest reconstruction in 2008

In 1997–99, the stadium was renovated again in accordance with FIFA guidelines, and its capacity was reduced to 83,450. The stadium continued to serve as the home territory of Dynamo, with the Lobanovsky stadium serving as a training ground. Sometime after 1998, major changes took place, as it was no longer efficient to keep and maintain the stadium as a club ground. Dynamo decided to reconstruct the Lobanovsky Dynamo Stadium as its primary ground, because match attendances rarely exceeded 10,000 spectators. Since that time, Olympic has been used primarily for football international matches, and it was lent to FC Dynamo Kyiv for high-profile home games when a high attendance was expected. However, it is not the official home ground of Dynamo or any other Kyiv club, as they all have smaller home stadiums and training bases. The stadium is an official home ground of the Ukraine national football team and was the official venue of the Ukrainian Cup final until 2008. In 2008, the stadium underwent a major reconstruction in preparation for the continental championship.

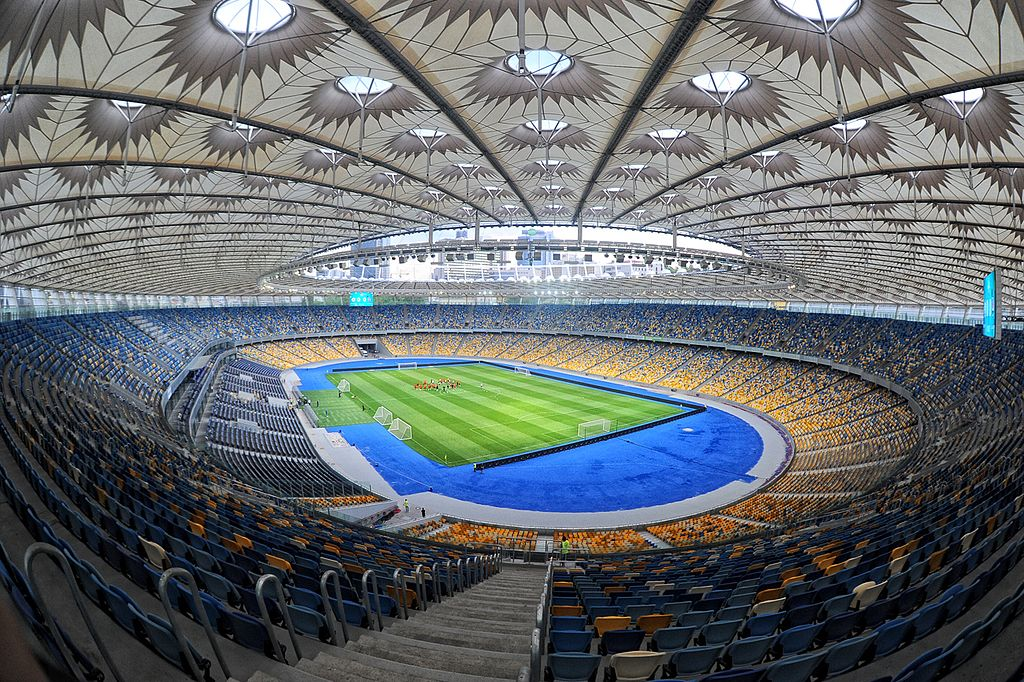
Interior of the stadium

During the 2019 Ukrainian presidential election, the debate between then-incumbent Petro Poroshenko and eventual winner Volodymyr Zelenskyy was held in the Olympic Stadium.

=== Previous names ===
For most of its history, the stadium was known as the Republican Stadium.

- 1923–1924: Leon Trotsky Red Stadium
- 1924–1935: Red Stadium
- 1936–1938: Stanislav Kosior Republican Stadium
- 1938–1941: Republican Stadium
- 1941: Nikita Khrushchev Republican Stadium (50,000 capacity in 1941)
- 1941–1943: All-Ukrainian Stadium (Occupation by Nazi Germany)
- 1943–1962: Nikita Khrushchev Republican Stadium (capacity reduced to 47,756 in 1944)
- 1962–1979: Central Stadium (100,062 capacity in 1967)
- 1980–1996: Republican Stadium
- 1996–present: Olympic National Sports Complex (83,450 capacity in 1999; reduced to 70,050 in 2011)

== 1980 Summer Olympics ==
During the 1980 Summer Olympics, three Group C and three Group D matches, as well as a quarter-final, were scheduled at the stadium, for a total of seven games. In the first of these matches (held on 20 July 1980), East Germany tied with Spain by a scoreline of 1–1. The sole quarter-final (held on 27 July 1980) saw East Germany beat Iraq with a record-breaking score of 4–0 on the way to their third title.

=== Matches at the 1980 Summer Olympics ===
Date	Time	Team	Result	Team	Round	Attendance
20 July 1980	12:00	East Germany	1–1	(International Olympic Committee) Spain	Group C	100,000
22 July 1980	12:00	East Germany	1–0	Algeria	Group C	70,000
24 July 1980	12:00	East Germany	5–0	Syria	Group C	80,000
21 July 1980	12:00	Iraq	3–0	Costa Rica	Group D	
23 July 1980	12:00	Iraq	0–0	Finland	Group D	40,000
25 July 1980	12:00	Iraq	1–1	Yugoslavia	Group D	
27 July 1980	12:00	East Germany	4–0	Iraq	Quarter-finals	48,000

== Euro 2012 ==
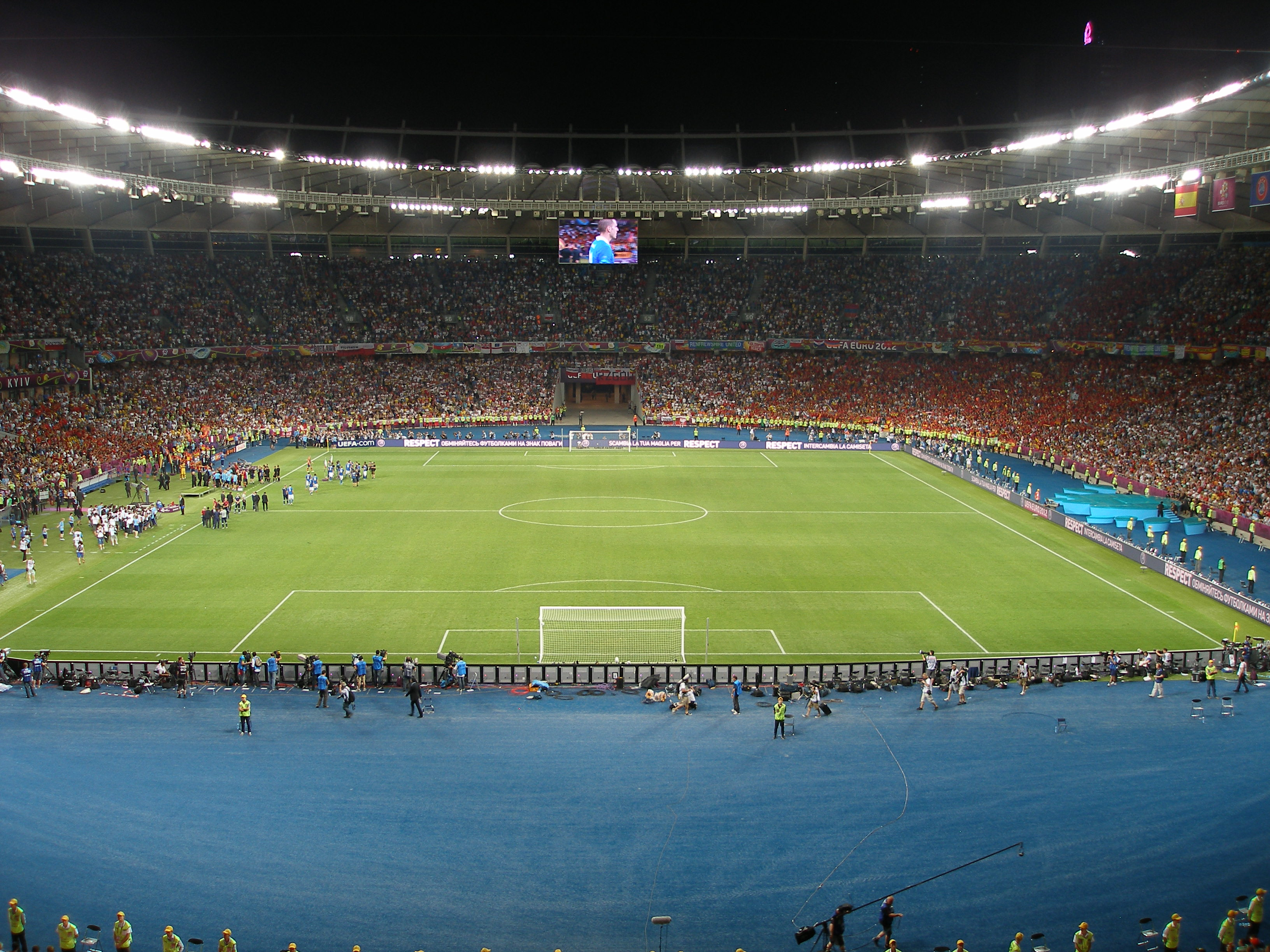
View of the stadium during the Euro 2012 final match

On 18 April 2007, Poland and Ukraine were chosen by UEFA to co-host the finals of Euro 2012, with the Olimpiyskiy Stadium set to host the final. The reconstruction of the stadium involved the demolition and rebuilding of the lower tier, a completely new west stand with a two-level press box, luxury boxes between the two tiers, the addition of a 13-storey high-rise building to the west (to house the Sheraton Kyiv Olimpiysky Hotel), and the addition of a new roof (of unique design) covering the entire seating area. The capacity of the stadium after the reconstruction is 70,050. Reconstruction began on 1 December 2008, when the winner of a tender was announced. It was scheduled to be finished in 2011. The stadium was officially opened by Ukrainian President Viktor Yanukovych on 8 October 2011.

The three Group D matches involving Sweden, a quarter-final, and the final were scheduled for here (with the other matches in Group D being played at the Donbas Arena). In the first match, Ukraine beat Sweden by a scoreline of 2–1. The final, held on 1 July 2012, saw Spain defeat Italy by the record-breaking score of 4–0 on the way to their third title.

=== Matches at Euro 2012 ===
Date	Time	Team	Result	Team	Round	Attendance
11 June 2012	21:45	Ukraine	2–1	Sweden	Group D	64,290
15 June 2012	22:00	Sweden	2–3	England	Group D	64,640
19 June 2012	21:45	Sweden	2–0	France	Group D	63,010
24 June 2012	21:45	England	0–0 (a.e.t.) (2–4 (p))	Italy	Quarter-finals	64,340
1 July 2012	21:45	Spain	4–0	Italy	Final	63,170

== 2018 UEFA Champions League ==
The 2018 UEFA Champions League final was played in the Olympic Stadium between Real Madrid and Liverpool on 26 May 2018.

UEFA Champions League finals
Season	Winners	Score	Runners-up	Attendance
2017–18	Real Madrid (Spain)	3-1	(England) Liverpool	61,561

== Concerts ==
When international music superstars or bands come to Kyiv, their concerts are often held in this stadium, as it is the biggest in Ukraine and one of the biggest in Europe. Artists who have performed here include George Michael and Shakira.

The Rolling Stones were scheduled to perform at the stadium on 25 July 2007 as part of their A Bigger Bang Tour, but the concert was moved to Warsaw, Poland because of political crisis and early parliament elections in Ukraine.

On 25 July 2012 a concert of the bands Red Hot Chili Peppers, Kasabian and The Vaccines was held in the stadium.

Madonna performed a concert at the stadium on 4 August 2012 as part of her The MDNA Tour. 31,022 people visited her show.

Depeche Mode performed at the stadium on 29 June 2013 during their The Delta Machine Tour, in front of a crowd of 36,562 people.

Famous Ukrainian rock-band Okean Elzy performed in the stadium their 20 anniversary on 21 June 2014, with an attendance of 71,045 people. The band again performed here on 18 June 2016 as part of their 2016–2017 world tour.

Aerosmith were scheduled to perform at the stadium on 2 July 2014 as part of their Global Warming Tour. However, the concert was cancelled due to the Russo-Ukrainian War.

Year	Date	Main act(s)	Opening act(s)	Tour / Concert name	Attendance	Additional notes
2011	8 October	(Colombia) Shakira	Ani Lorak; Gaitana; Taisia Povaliy	The Sun Comes Out World Tour	60,000	
2012	25 July	(United States) Red Hot Chili Peppers (United Kingdom) Kasabian (United Kingdom) The Vaccines		"Tuborg Greenfest 2012"	Near 40,000	Rock festival
2012	4 August	(United States) Madonna	~~Sebastian Ingrosso~~; DJ Kirill Doomski	The MDNA Tour	31,022	Absolute box office record in Ukraine – $4,893,317
2013	29 June	(United Kingdom) Depeche Mode		The Delta Machine Tour	36,562 / 38,640	
2014	21 June	(Ukraine) Okean Elzy		20 years together	More than 70,000	
2014	2 July	(United States) ~~Aerosmith~~		~~Global Warming Tour~~		Cancelled due to Russian invasion of Ukraine
2016	18 June	(Ukraine) Okean Elzy	SINOPTIK	Bez mezh	More than 85,000	Absolute record audience in Ukraine
2016	6 July	(United States) Red Hot Chili Peppers (United Kingdom) The Kills (United Kingdom) Nothing but Thieves (Ukraine) The Hardkiss		U-Park Festival		Rock festival
2016	8 July	(United Kingdom) Muse (United Kingdom) Hurts (Finland) Poets of the Fall (United Kingdom) My Vitriol (Ukraine) ШАNA		U-Park Festival		Rock festival
2017	19 July	(United Kingdom) Depeche Mode		Global Spirit Tour	30,803	
2017	23 September	(Italy) Andrea Bocelli			12,000	
2018	24 August	(Ukraine) Okean Elzy				
2018	31 August	(United States) Imagine Dragons		Evolve World Tour		
2018	30 September	(Spain) Enrique Iglesias		All The Hits Live (Enrique Iglesias)		
2019	16 June	(United States) Kiss		End of the Road World Tour		

== Adjacent infrastructure ==
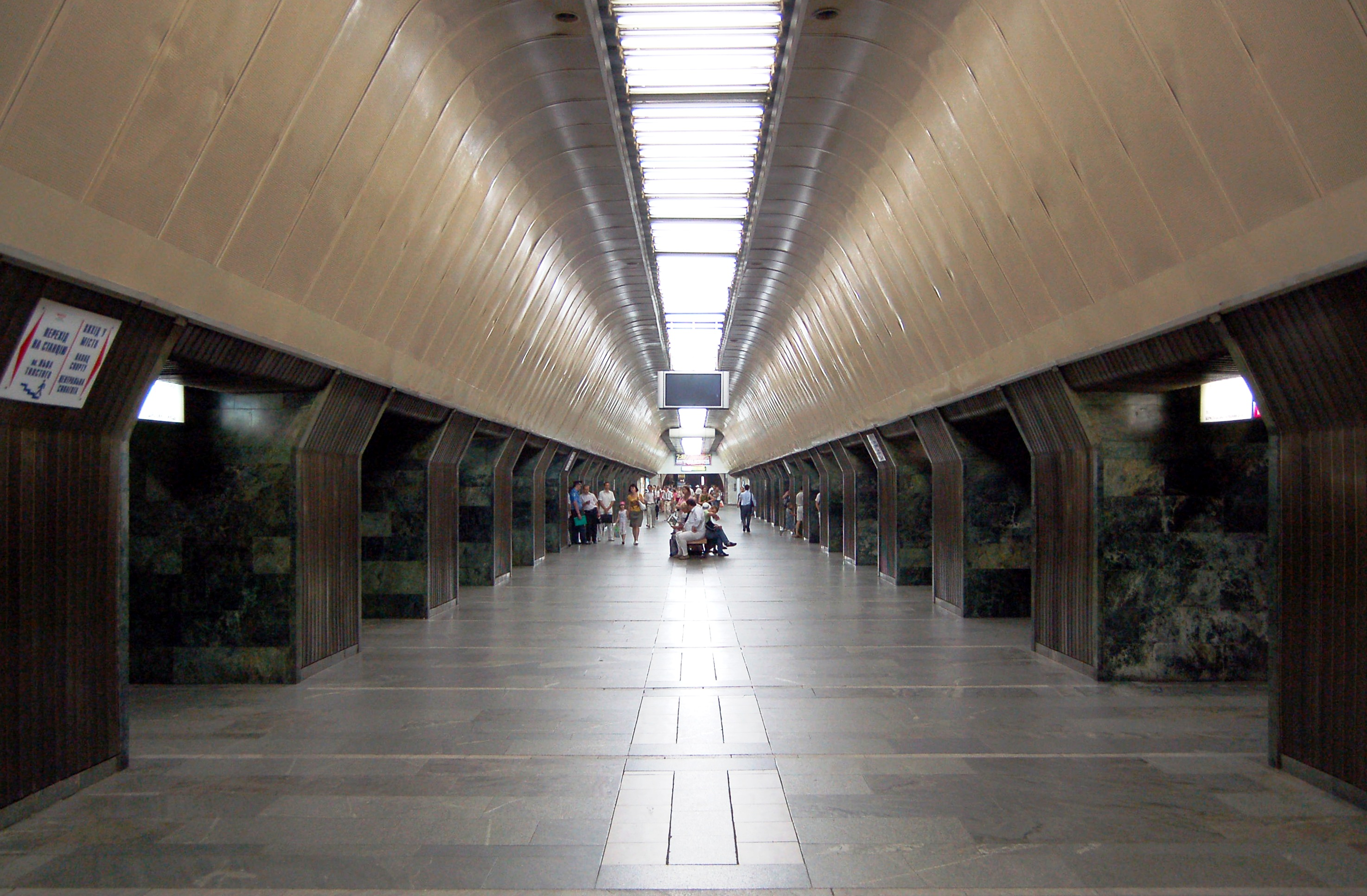
"Palats sportu" subway station

=== Transportation ===
The stadium is located right in the centre of Kyiv on the right bank of the River Dnipro. The stadium can be approached mainly by either Velyka Vasylkivska Street or Lesi Ukrainki Boulevard. Both streets' southern ends connect to the European route E95, which is known at that part of the city as Druzhby Narodiv Boulevard. However the main arena of the complex does not have a direct access to the mentioned streets and can only be reached through several smaller streets such as Fizkultury, Saksahanskoho, Shota Rustaveli, Esplanadna Streets and Hospitalny Lane.

There are several subway stations on the Kyiv Metro located within walking distance: "Olimpiiska" (~300 metres (0.19 miles)) and "Palats Sportu" (~400 metres (0.25 miles)). These are usually closed during matches. It is possible to use other nearby stations Klovska, Zoloti Vorota, Teatralna, Palats "Ukrayina". In December 2010, Kyiv City State Administration renamed the subway station "Respublikansky Stadion" as "Olimpiiska".

=== Sports facilities ===
- National University of Ukraine on Physical Education and Sport
- House of Football
- Palace of Sports (indoor arena)
- Bannikov Stadium (Viktor Bannikov training complex)
- Atlet track and field training complex

=== Tourist attractions ===
- Hotels: Rus, President Hotel, Sheraton
- Kyiv Fortress National Park

== See also ==
- List of football stadiums in Ukraine
- Lists of stadiums

Events and tenants
Preceded by Ernst-Happel-Stadion; Vienna	UEFA European Championship; Final venue 2012	Succeeded by Stade de France; Saint-Denis
Preceded by Millennium Stadium; Cardiff	UEFA Champions League; Final venue 2018	Succeeded by Wanda Metropolitano; Madrid
