= HC Ukrainochka (Kyiv) =

Ukrainian ice hockey club

HC Ukrainochka (ukr. ЖХК «Україночка») - is a Ukrainian women's ice hockey club in the capital city of Kyiv. It was created in 2015 and currently competes in the Ukrainian Women's Hockey League (Ukrainian: Чемпіонат України з хокею серед жінок).

The home rinks of the club are the "Ice Arena" and the Kyiv Sports Palace. The colors of the team are blue and yellow.

== History ==
HC Ukrainochka was created on January 10, 2015. Originally, its members were women whose sons were playing hockey.

The club was hosted by the NHL to travel to the United States as part of a charity event.

On December 19, 2015, Ukrainochka played four friendly matches with the other women's team in Ukraine, the Dnipro Squirrels.

HC Ukrainochka played in the amateur league in Kyiv before becoming one of the founding teams of the Ukrainian Women's Hockey League in the 2016–2017 season. The first goal of the league was scored by Ukrainochka's forward, Yulia Dobrovolska

== Roster ==
=== Goaltenders ===
#	Nationality	Player	Catches	Date of birth	Place of birth
1	Ukraine	Victoria Tkachenko	Left	9 April 1998	Kyiv Ukraine
44	Ukraine	Irina Byedokurova	Left	27 June 1988	Kyiv

=== Defensemen ===
#	Nationality	Player	Shoots	Date of birth	Place of birth
5	Ukraine	Anna Veremchuk			Kyiv
13	Ukraine	Marina Kobchuk	Left	15 January 1999	Kyiv
15	Ukraine	Marina Udovychenko	Left	16 August 1964	Kyiv
18	Ukraine	Larisa Verbenko	Left	30 October 1975	Kyiv
20	Ukraine	Aleksandra Slatvytska	Left	20 February 1989	Kyiv
71	United States	Kelly Ann Whelan	Right	22 January 1992	Washington, DC, USA
82	Ukraine	Viktoria Yanov	Left	21 July 2000	Kyiv
83	Ukraine	Olga Grechko	Left	26 October 1990	Kyiv
88	Ukraine	Natalya Romanenko	Left	11 September 1967	Kyiv
99	Ukraine	Irina Raenok	Left	24 October 1986	Kyiv

=== Forwards ===
#	Nationality	Player	Shoots	Date of birth	Place of birth
7	Ukraine	Elizaveta Alipova	Left	18 December 1997	Kyiv
8	Ukraine	Maria Gromova	Left	14 December 1996	Kyiv
9	Ukraine	Yulia Artemieva (C)	Left	15 November 1976	Kyiv
11	Ukraine	Anna Dorofeeva	Left	5 December 1998	Kyiv
12	Ukraine	Natalia Balysheva	Left	4 December 1976	Kyiv
14	Ukraine	Nadezhda Boboshko	Left	14 December 1981	Kyiv
16	Canada	Meagan Harrison		1985	Ottawa, Canada
19	Ukraine	Elena Alipova	Left	18 December 1997	Kyiv
24	Ukraine	Anastasia Ryabchun	Left	4 August 2000	Kyiv
28	Ukraine	Olga Pisarenko	Left	14 February 1976	Kyiv
55	Ukraine	Yulia Dobrovolska	Left	30 March 1998	Kyiv
70	Ukraine	Yulia Verhiles			Kyiv
77	Ukraine	Darya Suprun	Left	5 May 2000	Kyiv
78	Ukraine	Marina Kryvoruchko	Left	4 January 2000	Kyiv

=== Management ===
- President - Nadezhda Boboshko

=== Coaching Staff and Personnel ===
- Head Coach - Evgeny Alipov (since August 2015)
- Coach - Andrei Kochur
- Coach - Alexander Nikulichev
