= Jules James =

American naval officer (1885–1957)

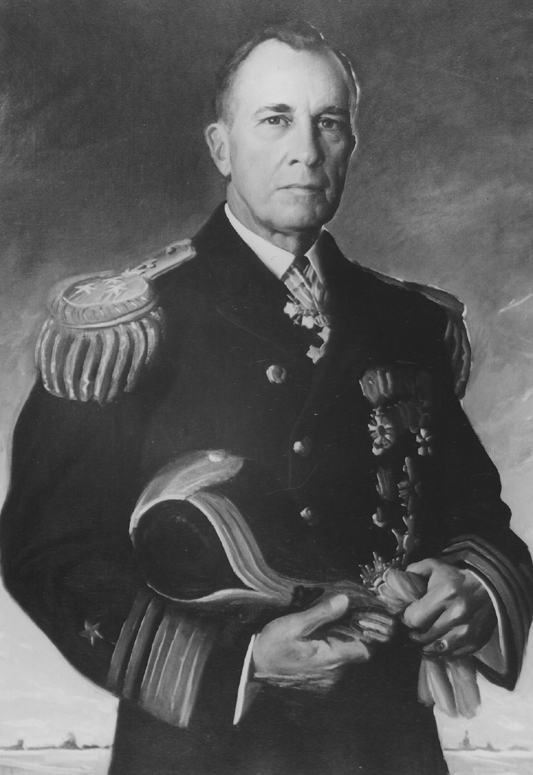
- Portrait of Admiral James by Bjorn Egeli while he commanded U.S. forces in Bermuda.
- Born: February 15, 1885; Danville, Virginia, US
- Died: 12 March 1975 (aged 90); Bethesda, Maryland, US
- Military career
- Allegiance: United States
- Branch: United States Navy
- Service years: 1906–1946
- Rank: Vice admiral
- Commands: USS Edsall (DD-219); USS Philadelphia (CL-41); Office of Naval Intelligence; Sixth naval district United States Sixth Fleet
- Awards: Legion of Honour
- Other work: Special representative, National Lead Company

Jules James (February 14, 1885 – March 12, 1957) was an American naval officer. During World War II, he commanded U.S. Naval forces in Bermuda and then later oversaw the construction of a large number of U.S. Navy ships while commanding the Sixth Naval District.

== Biography ==
James was born on 14 February 1885, in Danville, Virginia. He graduated from the U.S. Naval Academy in 1910 and was commissioned an ensign in the U.S. Navy. One of his early assignments was as a White House naval aide to President Woodrow Wilson from 1912 to 1913. The following year James had his first taste of combat, serving on the USS Florida during the Battle of Veracruz. Lieutenant Commander James served as Executive Officer aboard the USS Rochester (CA-2) during World War I as the ship escorted convoys to and from Europe. For his actions Jules was give a special letter of commendation. Later, during the 70th U.S. Congress, special dispensation allowed James to accept the French Legion of Honour for his World War I service.

In 1921, United States Army General Billy Mitchell, an outspoken advocate for air power, led a series of tests off the Virginia coast in which the ex-German battleship SMS Ostfriesland and other ships were sunk by bomber aircraft. James served as Chief Censor, given responsibility for censoring what information about the tests were released to the news media. After a tour aboard the USS Columbia in 1922, James served as assistant naval attache to the American embassies in France, Spain, and Portugal from 1923 to 1926.

At times between 1926 and 1934, James was navigator on the USS Florida (BB-30); commanded the USS Edsall (DD-219), with which he participated in the Yangtze River patrol; served as naval aide for the Governor-General of the Philippines; attended the Naval War College; and commanded the Destroyer Division 6, Battle Force, U.S. Fleet. In 1933, James was head of the Department of Ordnance and Gunnery at the U.S. Naval Academy. In 1937, he directed the fitting out of the light cruiser USS Philadelphia (CL-41), which he then commanded until mid-1939. On her shake-down cruise in January and February 1938, Philadelphia visited the Royal Naval Dockyard at the British Imperial fortress colony of Bermuda, the home base of the Royal Navy's America and West Indies Station 640 miles off North Carolina, where the ship's officers were hosted to lunch by Captain-in-Charge HM Dockyard, Captain Henry Bradford Maltby, and the dockyard cinema presented a special show for the crew. Captain James, selected other officers and US Consul Harold L. Williamson, was entertained at Government House by the Governor and General Officer Commanding-in-Chief, General Sir Reginald John Thoroton Hildyard. Captain James was also the guest of honour at a tea-dance held by the US Consul, where he was presented to more than 350 local naval, military and civil dignitaries, including Governor and Lady Hildyard, at the Princess Hotel.

From 1939 to 1941, James served as assistant director, and briefly acting director, of the Office of Naval Intelligence.

Following the onset of the Second World War in 1939, but prior to the US entry to the war, secret negotiations between the British and US governments would led to Britain granting the United States leases for a Naval Operating Base and Kindley Field of the Bermuda Base Command (this agreement would later be grouped with the exchange of base rights in other British territories for destroyers in the Destroyers-for-bases deal, although the bases in Bermuda and Newfoundland were granted freely). Already familiar with the British naval and military leadership in the British territory from his 1938 visit, James in 1941 became commander of the newly acquired U.S. Naval Operating Base, where he also commanded the combined U.S. and British local defense forces.

From May 1943 to September 1945, James commanded the Sixth Naval District, headquartered at Charleston Navy Yard, Charleston, South Carolina. In 1945 James received his final assignment, commander of United States Naval Forces, Mediterranean (now redesignated the U.S. Sixth Fleet) where he served until retiring from active duty in 1946.

In addition to being a serving officer, James was an inventor and songwriter. During his time in Bermuda James wrote and published the tune "Traveling High". Earlier in his career he was responsible for the invention of a new type of gunsight for Navy machine guns and a naval mine.

James died on March 12, 1957, aged 90 in, Bethesda, Maryland.

== Personal life ==
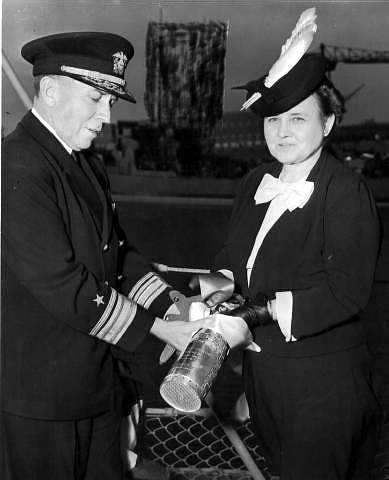
Admiral James and Mrs. William P. Liddle preparing to christen the USS Liddle (DE-206) at Charleston Navy Yard

In 1928, James married Eleanor Standish Gamble, niece of U.S. Secretary of War Henry L. Stimson. Gamble was also the great-great-granddaughter of American founding father Roger Sherman. Following his retirement from the Navy in 1946, James became a special representative in Europe for the National Lead Company.
