= Antoni Gołubiew =

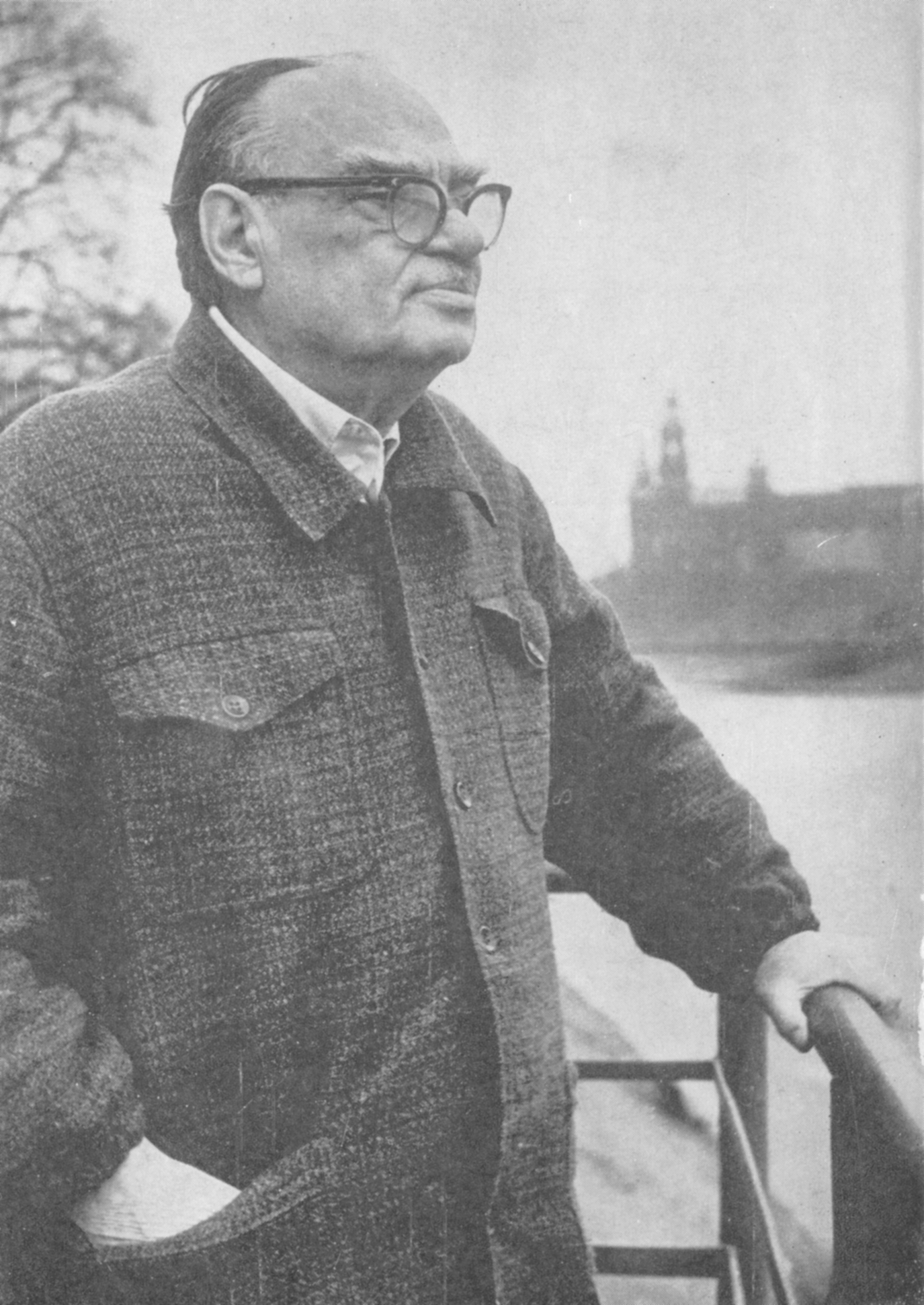
- Antoni Gołubiew, 1986
- Born: 25 February 1907; Vilnius
- Died: 27 June 1979 (aged 72); Kraków
- Occupations: Historian, writer

Antoni Gołubiew (25 February 1907 – 27 June 1979), nicknames Goa, Jan Karol Wayda, Jerzy Cichocki, was a Polish historian, writer and a Catholic publicist. He was one of the cofounders of the pre World War II biweekly Pax. After the war he wrote for the magazines Znak, Odra, and Tygodnik Powszechny. He was also one of the organizers (together with, among others, Czesław Miłosz) of the poetry group Zagary. He is best known as the author of the four volume historical epic Bolesław Chrobry which was written over the whole lifetime of the author. This epic tells the story of the founding and first years of existence of the Polish state.

== Works ==
- Mędrcy na arenie. 1935.
- Bolesław Chrobry. 1947–1974; volumes: Puszcza, Szło Nowe, Złe dni, Rozdroża.
- Listy do przyjaciela. 1955. Second edition 2009.
- Poszukiwania. Kraków: Wydawnictwo „ZNAK”. 1960.
- Na drodze. 1966.
- Unoszeni historią. 1971.
- Świadkowie przemian. 1974.
- Spotkanie na Świętokrzyskiej. 1975.
- Największa przygoda mego życia. Lata nad „Bolesławem Chrobrym”. Kraków: Społeczny Instytut Wydawniczy „ZNAK”. 1981.
- W dolinie dwóch rzek. Kazimierzówka. 1981.
- W żółtej poczekalni dworcowej pod zegarem. 1985.
- Szaja Ajzensztok. Trzy świeczniki siedmioramienne. 1985.
