= Valeriy Kopayev =

Valeriy Vasilyevich Kopayev (Russian: Валерий Васильевич Копаев); (15 July 1954 – 29 June 1979) was a Soviet Nordic combined skier who competed in the 1970s. He finished seventh in the Nordic combined event at the 1976 Winter Olympics in Innsbruck.
