= Peo Charles Koller =

British doctor, biologist of Hungarian origin

- Born: Koller Károly; 4 March 1901; Nagykanizsa
- Died: June 29, 1979 (aged 78)
- Education: University of Budapest (1928)
- Medical career
- Profession: cytologist, cytogeneticist

Pius Charles Koller FRSE (in hungarian: Koller Károly Pius; 4 March 1901 – 29 June 1979), known as Peo Charles Koller, was a Hungarian-born cytologist and cytogeneticist.

== Life ==
Koller was born in Nagykanizsa, Hungary on 4 March 1901. He studied at the University of Budapest graduating with a BSc in 1928, continuing as a postgraduate, gaining a PhD.

He left Hungary in the years leading up to World War II and relocated to Scotland in the early 1930s. In 1933 Koller obtained a DSc from the University of Edinburgh with a thesis on the dynamics of chromosome movement. In 1937 he was elected a Fellow of the Royal Society of Edinburgh. His proposers were Francis Albert Eley Crew, Alan William Greenwood, Sir Alick Buchanan-Smith, Baron Balerno, and James Nichol Pickard. He won the Society's Neill Prize for the period 1939 to 1941 and the David Anderson-Berry Prize for 1947.

In 1938 he began lecturing in animal genetics at the University of Edinburgh. In 1944 he moved to the Royal Cancer Hospital in London as Research Cytologist. In 1946 he moved again, this time to the Chester Beatty Research Institute, first as Cytologist then as Professor of Cytogenetics.

He died on 29 June 1979.

== Family ==
In 1946 he married Anna Edith Olsen.

== Publications ==
- Koller: Chromosomes and Genes: The Biological Basis of Heredity (1971)
- The Role of Chromosomes in Cancer Biology (1972)
