= Elisabeth Kadow =

- Kadow c. 1929
- Born: 19 March 1906; Bremerhaven, Bremen, German Empire
- Died: 11 June 1979 (aged 73); Krefeld, North Rhine-Westphalia, Germany

Elisabeth Kadow (née Jäger, 19 March 1906 – 11 June 1979) was a German textile artist involved with the Bauhaus movement.

== Early life and education ==
Elisabeth Kadow was born on 19 March 1906 in Bremerhaven. Her father was an architect.

At age 18, Kadow entered the Staatliches Bauhaus in Weimar as an apprentice. She studied under tapestry artist Irma Goecke.

== Career ==
Due to her achievements during her year of textile technology studies in Berlin and Dortmund, Kadow was hired as a teacher in Dortmund following her graduation. In 1939, she completed her master's apprenticeship with Georg Muche at the Textile Engineering School in Krefeld.

In 1940, Elisabeth married textile artist, painter, and graphic artist Gerhard Kadow. She became a teacher at the Higher Technical School of the Textile Industry Escuela (from 1944 known as the Textile Engineering School) in Krefeld, first teaching classes on fashion, and later leading classes on artistic print design. When Georg Muche retired from education in 1958, Elisabeth Kadow took charge of the master class for textile art and elevated its reputation to the international level. Elisabeth Kadow led the school's design department until 1971.

When she left the Textile Engineering School in 1971, she dedicated herself to textile design. Kadow designed embroidery, and worked with Gobelin-Manufaktur Nuremberg and weaver Johann Peter Heek to design tapestries. She also worked with weaver Hildegard von Portatius to design and create silk hangings and other similar works. Kadow used diverse textile production techniques to explore motifs of order and disorder within her work. She drew inspiration from a variety of sources, including watercolors, and considered factors such as shading, color combinations, and proportions when designing.

== Recognition ==
Elisabeth Kadow had much success in exhibitions and international fairs, and gained international fame. From 1954 until 1964, she exhibited her works at the Milan Triennial. In 1958, she exhibited at Expo 58 in Brussels. In 1958, she received Krefeld's Premio de Arte.

== Death and legacy ==
Elisabeth Kadow died on 11 June 1979 in Krefeld.

A street in the Allerheiligen de Neuss district was named in her honor.

== Bibliography ==
- Hans Joachim Albrecht: Elisabeth Kadow. 1906 bis 1979. Retrieved March 28, 2018.
- Adnan Benk (Hrsg.): Büyük Larousse. Sözlük ve Ansiklopedisi. Band 12: İşaret – Kart. Milliyet, Istanbul 1986.
- Hahn, Helmut (2007). Schüler und Zeitzeugen. Zu Elisabeth und Gerhard Kadow. Kunst und Krefeld e.V. ISBN 978-3-9811973-0-3.
- von Portatius, Hildegard (1971). Elisabeth Kadow. Seidenbehänge und Entwürfe. Osnabrück.
- Kadow, Elisabeth; Schwarzbauer, Georg Franz (1973). Elisabeth Kadow: Monographien zur rheinisch-westfälischen Kunst der Gegenwart. Vol. 46. Bongers. ISBN 3-7647-0249-4.
- Tölke, Dirk (2007). Elisabeth Kadow. Kunst und Krefeld e.V. Textilkultur in Krefeld. ISBN 978-3-9811973-0-3.
