= Bjorn Egeli =

Norwegian-American painter (1900–1984)

Herbjorn (Bjorn) Peter Egeli (15 November 1900 – 20 October 1984) was a Norwegian-born American portrait painter and maritime artist. After seven years at sea, he came to the United States in 1923 and studied at the Corcoran School of Art in Washington, D.C.

== Early life ==
Herbjorn Peter Egeli was born in Horten, Norway. He was the eldest of the three sons of Even Egeli (1874–1915) and Josefine Mathilde Wennerstrom (1875–1921). He had traditional schooling with additional art classes and wood-carving taught by his uncle, Hermann Ekeli (1885–1946) (the various family branches spelled the name either Ekeli or Egeli). Bjorn, who on his paternal grandfather's side descended from a family originating in Haukeli in Vinje Municipality in Telemark county, was not the first artist in his family. A great-great-uncle, Tor Sveinsen Øykjelie (1825–1882), was a well-known rosepainter who eventually emigrated to Wisconsin.

== Move to the United States ==
Egeli left Norway after the death of his father in 1915. It was the custom for young men to be on their own when coming to the confirmation age of 15 and so Egeli left to join the crew of a sailing ship out of Oslo.

== Education ==
After seven years at sea, during which time he painted maritime subjects and made ship models, he came to the United States in 1923 and entered Brooklyn Art School in New York. Later after another period at sea, in 1924, he entered the Corcoran School of Art in Washington, D.C. There he studied under Richard S. Meryman Sr. (1882–1963), Eugene M. Weisz and Samuel Burtis Baker (1882–1967). Early in his studies, his teachers noted Egeli's ability. This recognition earned him commissions from members of the community who came to the Corcoran to purchase paintings. One of his earliest works was a mural in one of the early houses in Chevy Chase, Maryland. Egeli did a painting of a medieval chase scene that showed the huntsmen leaving the castle, then pursuing a stag and finally, returning with it at the end of the day. Another project was a series of woodcuts for two books of poems (1932 and 1933) by Tom Sweeney.

== Career ==
The public quickly became aware of Egeli's talents, especially in portraiture. The list of commissions from the Washington area began to grow. Egeli at first used a room in the basement of the Corcoran as a studio.

In 1932 he returned to Norway to be united with his brothers and uncle for a short visit. His mother, Mathilde had died on May 17, 1921. At the time of his last visit to Norway, he considered America his home, having become a US citizen in 1921. Later that year he married Lois Baldwin, a fellow student at the Corcoran. They would eventually have five children, Peter Egeli, Cedric Egeli, Bjorn James Egeli, Mary Lois Ekroos, and Carolyn Egeli, all of whom pursued careers as professional artists. The next generation also includes at least four professional painters, including Arthur Egeli, Lisa Egeli, Anastasia and Ingrid Egeli.

Egeli's success at the Corcoran and his many successful commissions resulted in a one-man exhibit at the Smithsonian's National Portrait Gallery in early 1936. The exhibit of 34 portraits launched his career. Over the next nearly fifty years he continued to paint portraits. This includes two U.S. Presidents (Richard M. Nixon and Dwight D. Eisenhower for the Capitol Hill Club,) several Supreme Court Justices (Melville Weston Fuller and James Clark McReynolds), leaders in medicine (Mayo Brothers, Charles Horace Mayo and William James Mayo for the Mayo Clinic, and Paul Henry Streit for Walter Reed Army Institute of Research), industrialists (Lamont DuPont for DuPont and James F. Donovan, among others), military leaders (Adm. Jules James, Gen. Maxwell Taylor, Gen. Douglas MacArthur, Gen. Henry L. Benning, and others), political leaders (Speaker of the Maryland House of Delegates, Thomas Hunter Lowe and others) and educators (Canon Albert H. Lucas, of St. Alban's School in Washington, DC, and Pierre Samuel DuPont of the University of Delaware).

Late in his life, Egeli turned his attention again to the sea and resumed painting maritime subjects including some of the ships he had once sailed. Egeli died at his home in Valley Lee, Maryland, on October 20, 1984, at the age of 83.

== Literature ==
- Egeli, Peter E. (2013) Bjorn Egeli: A Life in Images. ISBN 9780615817439.
- Lund, Kathrine. (2015) The Art of Diplomacy. The Art Collection of the Ministry of Foreign Affairs, pp. 90–91. ISBN 9788275477581.
- Stølen, Gunnlaug Haugarne. Øykjelieslekta, a genealogical survey published in Bygdemellom, Sullamrei Historielag (Historical Society), 2002, pp. 5–19.
