= Norm Chisholm =

Australian rules footballer, born 1914

Personal information
- Full name: Norm Chisholm
- Born: 17 October 1914
- Died: 13 June 1979 (aged 64)
- Original team: Williamstown
- Height: 168 cm (5 ft 6 in)
- Weight: 66 kg (146 lb)

Playing career^{1}
Years	Club	Games (Goals)
1942–43	Footscray	29 (2)
- ^{1} Playing statistics correct to the end of 1943.

Norm Chisholm (17 October 1914 – 13 June 1979) was a former Australian rules footballer who played with Footscray in the Victorian Football League (VFL).

Originally from Spotswood, Chisholm played three seasons with Williamstown in the VFA from 1939 to 1941 before the recess in respect of World War II. He returned to Williamstown in 1945 and played a further three seasons, finishing up in 1947 after 91 games and 19 goals. He played on the wing in both Williamstown's 1939 and 1945 premiership victories and took out the Club best and fairest award in 1940 and the most consistent player trophy in 1945. He went to Newport as coach during 1947.
