= Harold Feehan =

Australian rules footballer

Personal information
- Full name: Harold Joseph Augustine Feehan
- Born: 21 April 1895; Essendon, Victoria
- Died: 7 June 1979 (aged 84); Caulfield South, Victoria
- Original team: Ascot Vale

Playing career^{1}
Years	Club	Games (Goals)
1915	Essendon	11 (0)
- ^{1} Playing statistics correct to the end of 1915.

Harold Feehan (21 April 1895 – 7 June 1979) was an Australian rules footballer who played with Essendon in the Victorian Football League (VFL).
