= Jim McEwin =

New Zealand cricketer

Personal information
- Full name: James Nankivelle McEwin
- Born: 11 September 1898; Wellington, New Zealand
- Died: 13 June 1979 (aged 80); Christchurch, New Zealand
- Batting: Right-handed
- Bowling: Leg-break and googly

Domestic team information
- Years: Team
- 1917-18 to 1927-28: Canterbury

Career statistics
Competition	First-class
Matches	16
Runs scored	312
Batting average	16.42
100s/50s	0/0
Top score	39
Balls bowled	2774
Wickets	41
Bowling average	32.85
5 wickets in innings	2
10 wickets in match	1
Best bowling	5/87
Catches/stumpings	6/–
- Source: Cricinfo, 17 September 2018

James Nankivelle McEwin (11 September 1898 – 13 June 1979) was a New Zealand cricketer who played first-class cricket for Canterbury from 1917 to 1928.

A leg-spinner, Jim McEwin had his best performance in January 1919, taking 5 for 108 and 5 for 87 when Canterbury defeated Wellington by seven wickets to regain the Plunket Shield. In the second innings he opened the bowling and bowled 29 overs unchanged. In senior club cricket for Sydenham in Christchurch he played 93 matches and took 454 wickets at an average of 16, taking five or more wickets in an innings 40 times.
