= Mykhailo Hrechyna =

Mykhailo Hnatovych Hrechyna (Ukrainian: Миха́йло Гна́тович Гречи́на; April 2, 1902 – June 21, 1979), a Soviet architect from Ukraine, recipient of the Ukrainian State Prize (1982).

== Biography ==
Mykhailo Hrechyna was born in the village of Budyshche, Kiev Governorate (Russian Empire), today it's the village of Cherkasy Raion around the city of Cherkasy. In 1930 he graduated from the architect department of the Kiev Art Institute (today, National Academy of visual arts and architecture).

== Works ==
=== Kiev ===
- Lobanovskyi Dynamo Stadium 1937 (co-author)
  - reconstruction - 1956-58, 1978–79
- Olimpiysky National Sports Complex, 1937–41
  - reconstruction - 1967, 1978
- Palace of Sports 1960
- Komsomolsky Residential Massif 1963
- Building of the Trade-Industrial Chamber 1964
- Hotel "Rus" 1965-79

=== Kaniv ===
- Hotel "Taras's Hill" 1961

== Family ==
- Father of Vadym Hrechyna

== Awards ==
- State Prize of Ukraine in Science and Technology - 1983
