= James F. Donovan =

American businessman (1902–1979)

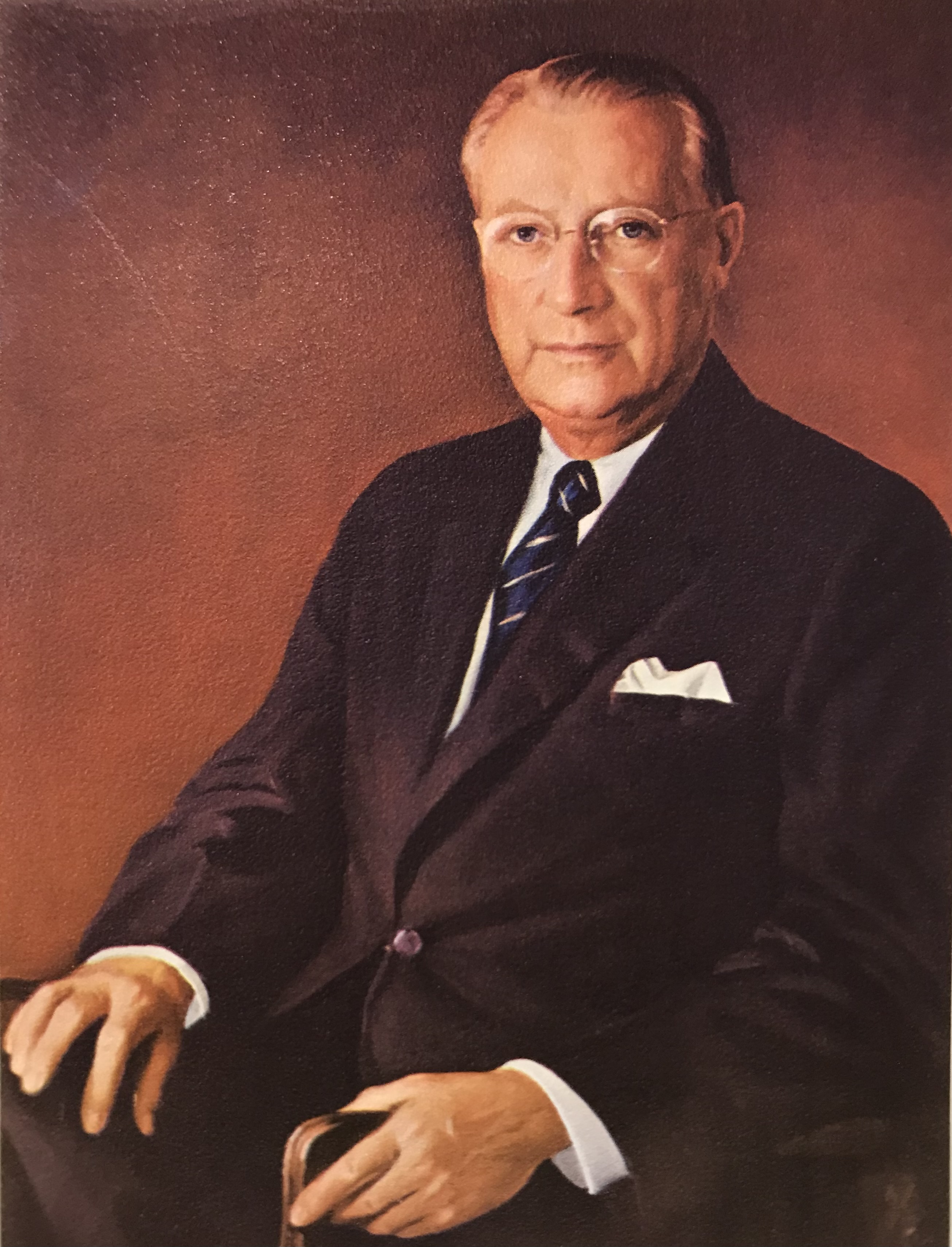
- Born: James F. Donovan; July 26, 1902
- Died: June 7, 1979 (aged 76)
- Citizenship: United States
- Education: Bentley University
- Occupation: Businessman

James F. Donovan (July 26, 1902 – June 7, 1979) was an American businessman and industrialist. Donovan served as co-trustee of the F.H Prince Holding Company which oversaw multiple corporations. Donovan was chairman of the Union Stock Yard and Transit Company, often called “The Chicago Stock Yards”. During his career, he administered the Central Manufacturing's 11 industrial parks in Chicago and industrial parks in Phoenix and Tempe, AZ and Sacramento, CA. He also served in a trustee role at Bentley University.

In 1965, Donovan was painted by Bjorn Peter Egeli for the Saddle & Sirloin Club after winning one of the greatest distinctions in the agriculture industry. His portrait hung in the club's Agriculture Hall of Fame for nearly two decades and now hangs in the Kentucky Exposition Center in Louisville.

== Education ==
Donovan enrolled at Bentley University, then the Bentley School of Accounting and Finance, in Boston in 1920, where he studied Accounting and Finance. He was among the first classes of students to graduate from this institution.

== Career ==
Donovan began his career in 1918, at the age of 15, when he joined Frederick H. Prince's Brokerage as a messenger boy. He ascended through the ranks of the company and over his tenure he held the positions of bookkeeper, accountant, controller, and treasurer.

When Frederick H. Prince died in 1953, Donovan and William Wood Prince were named co-trustees of the F. H. Prince Holding Company and oversaw multiple corporations. Eventually, he also took over Prince's Central Manufacturing industrial park network in Chicago, as well as similar industrial real estate locations in Phoenix and Tempe, AZ and Sacramento, CA. In addition, Donovan served as director of the International Livestock Exposition and was director of Armour & Company, one of the country's major slaughterhouses and meatpacking operations. Donovan was also appointed co-trustee with William Wood Prince of the Prince Family Trusts which today stands as a memorial to Frederick Henry Prince.

As one of the early graduates of Bentley University, Donovan maintained a longtime friendship with founder, Henry C. Bentley, and was appointed as Trustee of Bentley University in 1948.

Donovan was also a trustee of Franklin Pierce College in New Hampshire, an associate of Northwestern University and a citizen's board member of Loyola University.

== Awards and recognition ==
Donovan received one of the greatest distinctions in the agriculture industry in 1965 for his leadership skills and efforts as the chairman of The Chicago Stock Yards when his portrait was placed alongside industry greats in the Saddle and Sirloin Club’s Agricultural Hall of Fame. The Saddle & Sirloin Club collection honors leaders in all facets of the American livestock industry.

== Personal life ==
Donovan and his wife lived on a 12-acre farm in Wheaton, IL with their six children. Aside from his business ventures, Donovan was an active member of a number of educational, civic, and charitable organizations.
