= Palace of Sports, Kyiv =

Sport-concert complex situated in the center of Kyiv, Ukraine

Palace of Sports
- Палац Спорту
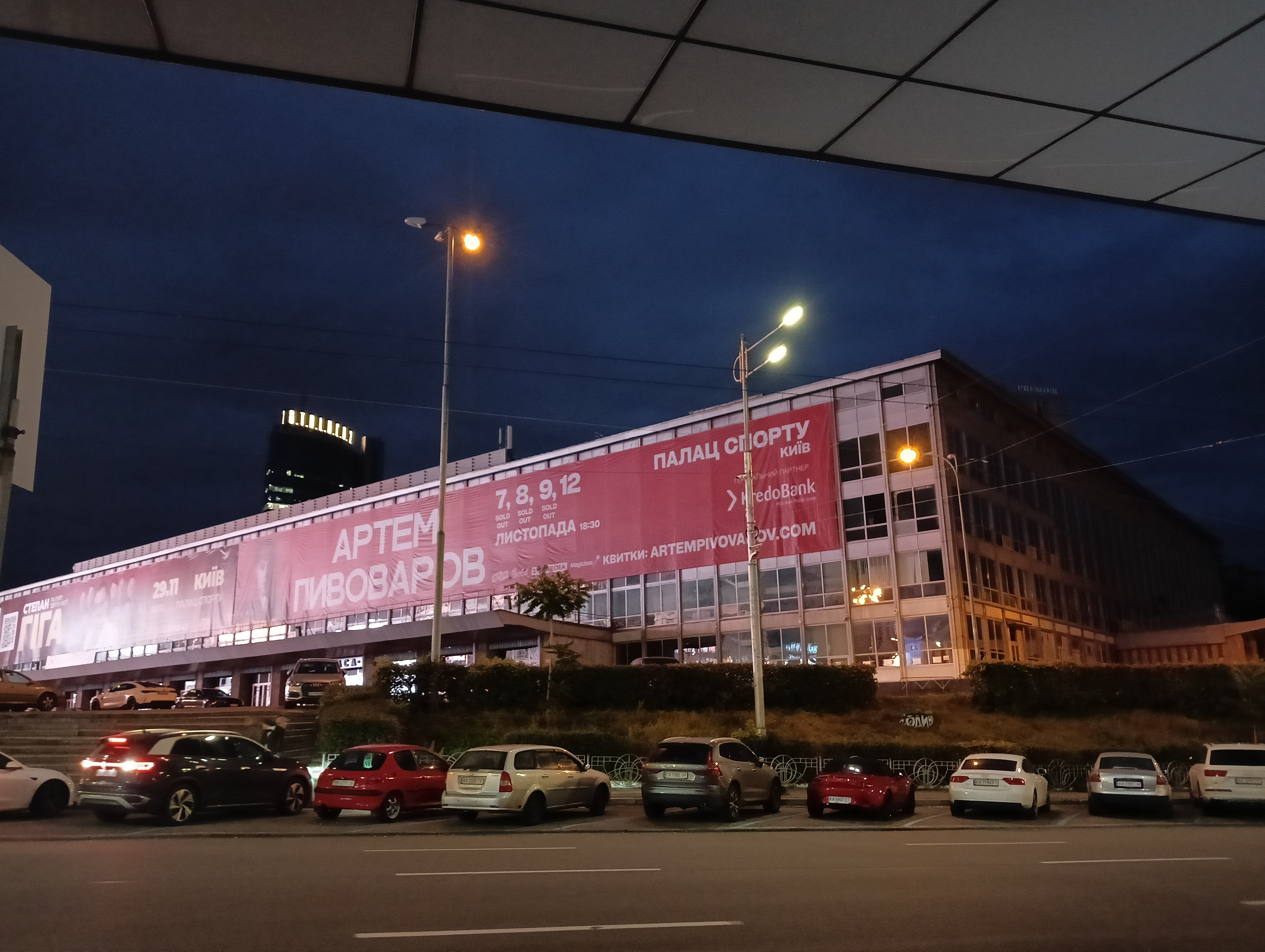
- Palace of Sports at night
- Interactive map of Palace of Sports
- Location: Shevchenko, Kyiv, Ukraine
- Coordinates: 50°26′14″N 30°31′20″E
- Owner: Kyivskyi Palats Sportu CJSC
- Capacity: Concerts: 10,000; Ice hockey: ≤7,000
- Surface: floor/ice variable
- Field size: 66 m x 102 m
- Public transit: Kyiv Metro: at Ploshcha Ukrainskykh Heroiv at Palats Sportu

Construction
- Built: 1958–1960
- Opened: December 9, 1960
- Renovated: 1981–82, 2004–05, 2010–11
- Architects: Mykhailo Hrechyna, Oleksii Zavarov, engineer Viktor Repyakh

Tenant
- Kyiv-Basket (2018–present)

The Palace of Sports (Ukrainian: Палац Спорту, romanized: Palats Sportu, pronounced [pɐˈlɑts ˈspɔrtʊ]) is an indoor sport-concert complex situated in the center of Kyiv, Ukraine. The complex is an independent state enterprise.

== History ==
It was built between 1958 and 1960, to design of architects Mykhailo Hrechyna and Oleksiy Zavarov, engineer Viktor Repyakh as a major indoor sports arena and was opened on 9 December 1960. Constructivist Architecture, an artistic movement sporting mostly simple geometric forms was used in the design.

In the first 50 years, the Sports Palace was the venue for 16 world championships, 28 European championships, 42 championships of the USSR and more than 4,000 concerts and theatre shows as stage performances. In addition, there were around 400 exhibitions and fairs. The events attracted more than 24 million visitors.

=== Renovations ===
In 1980–1982, the Palace of Sport was reconstructed (by the Kyivproject Institute and the Kyiv Zonal Scientific Research Institute for Experimental Design). The lighting and technical facilities were almost completely modernized, the interiors and halls were expanded and otherwise illuminated, the palace was equipped with numerous changing rooms and sideboards.

The Palace of Sports was confirmed by officials as the host venue for the Eurovision Song Contest 2005 in September 2004. However, in order to host the contest, the facilities had been brought up to the standard required by the European Broadcasting Union (EBU). At the end of December 2004, work began on the renovation of the hall, for which approximately 4 million francs were allocated. Renovation works were to be finished by 20 April, however, they were completed at the beginning of May. The arena could accommodate over 5,000 seated spectators. Additionally 2,000 press delegates were catered for.

A further reconstruction took place from October 2010 in preparation to host matches for the 2011 IIHF World Championship Division I. As part of the reconstruction, the backstage space was completely re-equipped, six sports locker rooms were installed, the hall lighting was modernized, and the ventilation, air-conditioning, heating and fire safety systems were completely replaced. In addition, a modern quadrilateral display appeared above the arena. In the stands, plastic seats were installed in the colors of the national flag: the total number of seats is 6,900 for sporting events, increased to 9,800 when in concert-mode.

== Events ==
The venue hosts indoor sports games, concerts, major exhibitions and trade fairs.

=== Sport ===
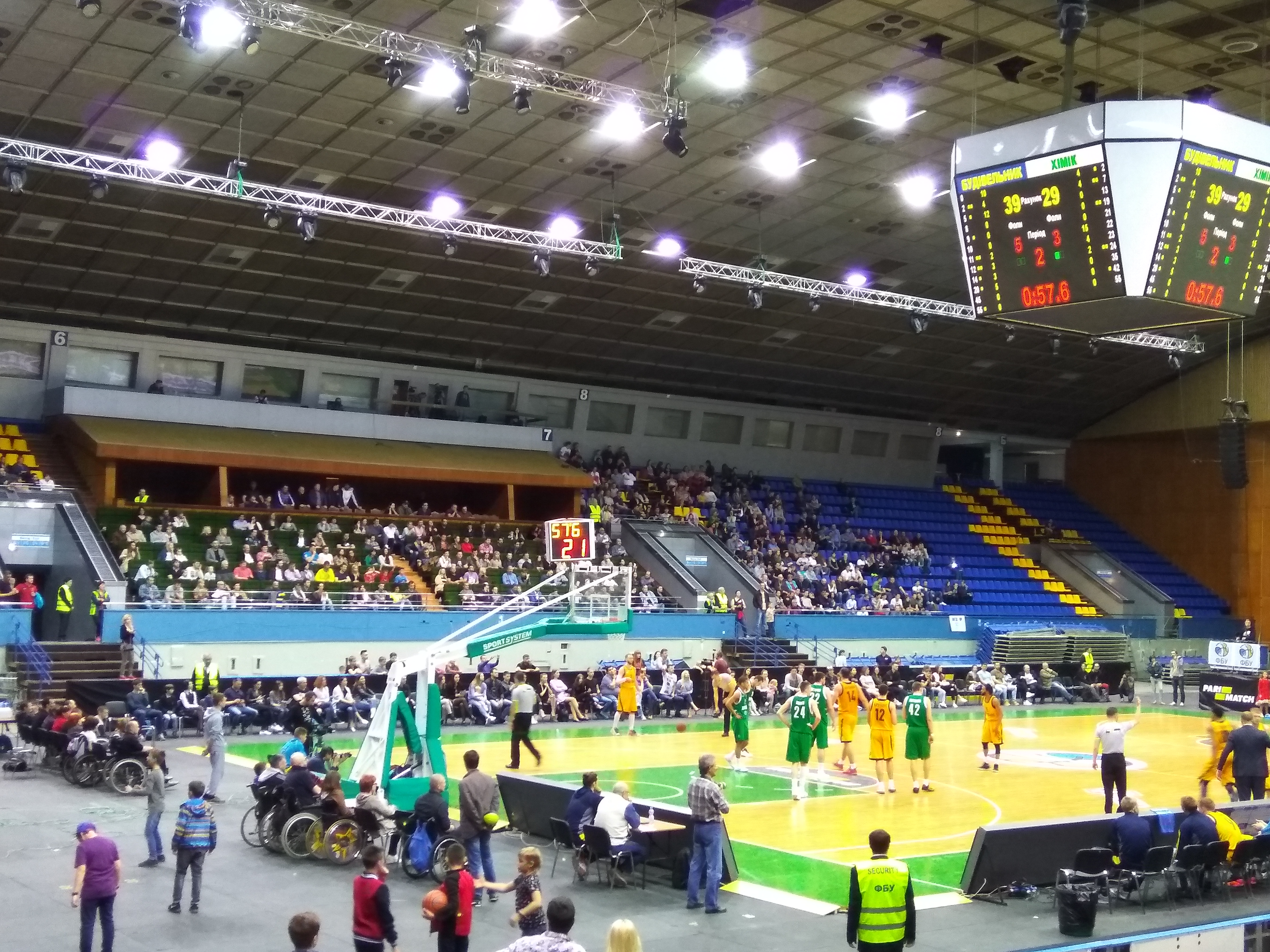
2016–17 Ukrainian Basketball SuperLeague final, Budivelnyk vs. Khimik (April 2017)

The hall hosts ice hockey, basketball and boxing competitions. The home teams have included the ice hockey club Sokil Kyiv and the basketball clubs BC Kyiv and BC Budivelnyk.

Major sporting events to be held at the arena include the 2012 Professional Hockey League All-Star Game, 2013 FIBA Europe Under-16 Championship and 2013 World Rhythmic Gymnastics Championships.

=== Eurovision ===
It hosted the Eurovision Song Contest 2005, which required the facilities to be brought up to the standard stipulated by the European Broadcasting Union. Four years later, the Junior Eurovision Song Contest 2009 was hosted in the venue. It is one of the two venues to have hosted both the junior and adult versions of the song contest (The other being Rotterdam Ahoy which hosted the Junior Eurovision Song Contest 2007 and the Eurovision Song Contest 2021).

=== Concerts ===
The Sports Palace is also a popular venue for concerts, having been the venue for Didier Marouani and Space on 10, 11, 12, 13, 14, 15 of July 1983, Ace of Base, Backstreet Boys, Black Eyed Peas, Britney Spears, Deep Purple, Judas Priest, A-ha, Jamiroquai, Jean Michel Jarre, Moby, Thirty Seconds to Mars, Muse, Placebo, Limp Bizkit, The Rasmus, Christina Aguilera, Anastacia, Lenny Kravitz, Chris Rea, Lara Fabian, Depeche Mode, Sting, Marilyn Manson, The Prodigy and others.

=== Business ===
The Sports Palace hosts annual business events, such as: Megatraining, Dream Big Forum, Big Money Forum, Business Concentrate, and Online Business Laboratory.

Events and tenants
Preceded by Abdi İpekçi Arena; Istanbul	Eurovision Song Contest Venue; 2005	Succeeded by Olympic Indoor Hall; Athens
Preceded by Spyros Kyprianou Athletic Centre; Limassol	Junior Eurovision Song Contest Venue; 2009	Succeeded by Minsk Arena; Minsk
Preceded by Tivoli Hall; Ljubljana	IIHF World Championship Division I Venue; 2011	Succeeded by Krynica Ice Stadium; Krynica
Preceded by Spodek; Katowice	IIHF World Championship Division I Venue; 2017	Succeeded by László Papp Budapest Sports Arena; Budapest
