= Hans Kadelbach =

German sailor

Hans Kadelbach (1 October 1900 – 7 June 1979) was a German sailor who competed in the 1952 Summer Olympics.
