= 2022–23 PLK season =

PLK
- Season: 2022–23
- Dates: 22 September 2022 – 15 June 2023
- Teams: 16
- TV partner: Polsat Sport

Regular season
- Top seed: WKS Śląsk Wrocław
- Season MVP: (Poland) Andrzej Mazurczak
- Relegated: Astoria Bydgoszcz

Finals
- Champions: Wilki Morskie Sczecin (1st title)
- Runners-up: WKS Śląsk Wrocław
- Third place: Stal Ostrów Wielkopolski
- Fourth place: Legia Warszawa
- Finals MVP: (United States) Bryce Brown

Statistical leaders
Points	(United States) Jeremiah Martin	19.1
Rebounds	(United States) Adam Kemp	9.6
Assists	(United States) Courtney Fortson	8.4
Index Rating	(United States) Jeremiah Martin	20.9
- All statistics correct as of complete.

The 2022–23 Polish Basketball League (PLK) season, the Energa Basket Liga for sponsorship reasons, was the 89th season of the Polish Basketball League, the highest professional basketball league in Poland. Śląsk Wrocław were the defending champions.

== Teams ==
16 teams participated in the season.

Rosa Radom was relegated and Sokół Łańcut was promoted from I Liga.

=== Locations and venues ===
Location of teams in the 2022–23 PLK season

Team	Location	Arena	Capacity
Anwil Włocławek	Włocławek	Hala Mistrzów	4,200
Arka Gdynia	Gdynia	Gdynia Sports Arena	5,500
Stal Ostrów Wielkopolski	Ostrów Wielkopolski	Arena Ostrów	3,086
Astoria Bydgoszcz	Bydgoszcz	Sisu Arena	1,470
Czarni Słupsk	Slupsk	Hala Gryfia	2,500
GTK Gliwice	Gliwice	Gliwice Arena	13,752
King Wilki Morskie Szczecin	Szczecin	Netto Arena	7,403
Legia Warsaw	Warsaw	OSiR Bemowo	1,000
MKS Dąbrowa Górnicza	Dąbrowa Górnicza	Centrum Hall	2,944
Start Lublin	Lublin	Hala Globus	5,000
Śląsk Wrocław	Wrocław	Hala Orbita	3,000
Sokół Łańcut	Łańcut	MOSiR Łańcut	1,200
Spójnia Stargard	Stargard	Hala Miejska	2,500
Trefl Sopot	Sopot	Ergo Arena	15,000
Twarde Pierniki Toruń	Toruń	Arena Toruń	6,248
Zastal Enea Zielona Góra	Zielona Góra	CRS Hall	6,080

== Regular season ==
=== League table ===
Pos	Team	Pld	W	L	PF	PA	PD	Pts	Qualification or relegation
1	WKS Śląsk Wrocław	30	22	8	2541	2344	+197	52	Advance to playoffs
2	King Szczecin (C)	30	22	8	2600	2465	+135	52	Advance to playoffs
3	Stal Ostrów Wielkopolski	30	20	10	2584	2426	+158	50	Advance to playoffs
4	Legia Warszawa	30	20	10	2536	2423	+113	50	Advance to playoffs
5	Spójnia Stargard	30	18	12	2510	2462	+48	48	Advance to playoffs
6	Czarni Słupsk	30	17	13	2325	2221	+104	47	Advance to playoffs
7	Anwil Włocławek	30	17	13	2532	2395	+137	47	Advance to playoffs
8	Trefl Sopot	30	17	13	2468	2422	+46	47	Advance to playoffs
9	Zastal Zielona Góra	30	16	14	2561	2522	+39	46	
10	Arka Gdynia	30	11	19	2464	2581	−117	41	
11	MKS Dąbrowa Górnicza	30	11	19	2544	2665	−121	41	
12	Sokół Łańcut	30	11	19	2292	2398	−106	41	
13	Start Lublin	30	11	19	2414	2549	−135	41	
14	GTK Gliwice	30	10	20	2377	2516	−139	40	
15	Twarde Pierniki Toruń	30	9	21	2457	2618	−161	39	
16	Astoria Bydgoszcz	30	8	22	2538	2736	−198	38	Relegation to I Liga

Source: PLK
(C) Champions

=== Results ===
Home \ Away	ANW	GDY	STA	CZA	BYD	GTK	LAN	SZC	LEG	MKS	TOR	SPO	LUB	SOP	WRO	ZIE
Anwil Włocławek	—	110–86	86–88	79–70	97–81	88–63	78–89	99–91	91–97	94–72	86–79	78–81	86–63	80–83	73–75	82–61
Arka Gdynia	93–79	—	92–80	68–88	85–88	91–76	84–81	88–102	81–83	84–74	87–99	76–77	90–79	75–82	87–70	78–90
Stal Ostrów Wielkopolski	71–68	102–73	—	74–84	103–80	100–76	87–75	95–92	90–87	85–76	90–58	80–85	78–74	79–84	68–75	88–72
Czarni Słupsk	85–73	66–64	66–90	—	82–78	49–60	91–88	66–83	73–86	83–74	94–58	68–51	82–60	83–60	75–77	64–66
Astoria Bydgoszcz	95–84	88–102	88–94	59–86	—	83–72	87–78	104–103	61–86	78–80	90–100	89–98	92–100	80–91	99–111	73–91
GTK Gliwice	80–82	70–81	97–82	84–64	82–89	—	87–86	90–83	135–136	77–79	90–85	83–95	63–49	82–92	71–91	88–94
Sokół Łańcut	67–85	85–74	70–67	69–83	84–72	68–73	—	76–91	72–83	60–68	74–66	79–83	74–72	81–74	92–85	86–74
King Szczecin	88–87	98–93	88–97	88–77	88–80	84–62	75–73	—	69–65	88–81	99–101	97–95	86–78	103–79	78–103	69–64
Legia Warsaw	78–70	90–61	68–96	70–63	96–88	61–84	75–61	77–92	—	101–86	81–68	69–71	108–90	79–71	63–76	87–81
MKS Dąbrowa Górnicza	79–82	86–91	88–100	95–94	92–89	88–70	103–102	76–79	93–76	—	96–106	100–85	92–91	82–91	96–103	88–108
Twarde Pierniki Toruń	74–84	79–98	82–95	74–73	88–92	96–89	72–60	73–81	84–88	106–77	—	92–88	80–93	79–81	74–83	72–89
Spójnia Stargard	93–94	88–61	89–91	83–69	73–72	59–64	96–63	81–88	97–80	90–83	92–82	—	99–106	77–66	81–79	82–77
Start Lublin	70–81	72–71	90–71	80–91	101–97	79–68	74–83	75–69	76–103	91–89	104–83	85–94	—	96–75	70–100	76–83
Trefl Sopot	73–81	115–83	93–78	71–77	90–71	98–79	83–68	86–91	70–80	87–73	87–85	91–79	74–69	—	74–88	81–90
WKS Śląsk Wrocław	82–91	87–80	83–68	74–86	101–90	84–73	75–76	66–78	83–77	80–88	79–74	99–66	91–84	71–67	—	85–78
Zastal Zielona Góra	88–84	97–87	87–97	85–93	98–105	100–89	81–72	78–79	90–106	94–90	98–88	101–82	96–67	83–99	67–85	—

Source: PLK
Legend: Blue = home team win; Red = away team win.
Matches with lighter background shading were decided after overtime.

== Playoffs ==
Quarterfinals and semifinals are played in a best-of-five format (2–2–1) while the finals in a best-of-seven one (2–2–1–1–1).

=== Bracket ===
Quarterfinals
1	WKS Śląsk Wrocław	3
8	Trefl Sopot	1
4	Legia Warszawa	3
5	Spójnia Stargard	0
2	King Szczecin	3
7	Anwil Włocławek	2
3	Stal Ostrów Wielkopolski	3
6	Czarni Słupsk	0

Semifinals
1	WKS Śląsk Wrocław	3
4	Legia Warszawa	1
2	King Szczecin	3
3	Stal Ostrów Wielkopolski	1

Finals
1	WKS Śląsk Wrocław	2
2	King Szczecin	4
Third place
3	Stal Ostrów Wielkopolski	170
4	Legia Warszawa	161

=== Quarterfinals ===
Team 1	Series	Team 2	Game 1	Game 2	Game 3	Game 4	Game 5
WKS Śląsk Wrocław	3–1	Trefl Sopot	80–73	87–95	88–80	84–75	—
King Szczecin	3–2	Anwil Włocławek	91–86	76–77	84–75	64–70	81–67
Stal Ostrów Wielkopolski	3–0	Czarni Słupsk	95–85	70–63	77–70	—	—
Legia Warszawa	3–0	Spójnia Stargard	84–77	91–78	93–82	—	—

=== Semifinals ===
Team 1	Series	Team 2	Game 1	Game 2	Game 3	Game 4	Game 5
WKS Śląsk Wrocław	3–1	Legia Warszawa	83–77	71–57	55–78	65–63	—
King Szczecin	3–1	Stal Ostrów Wielkopolski	80–78	79–74	60–92	79–76	—

=== Third place series ===
Team 1	Agg.	Team 2	1st leg	2nd leg
Stal Ostrów Wielkopolski	170–161	Legia Warszawa	85–73	85–88

=== Finals ===
Team 1	Series	Team 2	Game 1	Game 2	Game 3	Game 4	Game 5	Game 6	Game 7
WKS Śląsk Wrocław	2–4	King Szczecin	78–89	65–92	67–90	85–75	82–70	72–92	—

== Awards ==
All official awards of the 2022–23 PLK season.

=== Season awards ===
Award	Player	Team	Ref.
PLK Most Valuable Player	(Poland) Andrzej Mazurczak	Wilki Morskie Szczecin	
PLK Finals MVP	(United States) Bryce Brown	Wilki Morskie Szczecin	
PLK Best Defender	(Poland) Przemyslaw Zolnierewicz	Zastal Zielona Góra	
PLK Best Polish Player	(Poland) Andrzej Mazurczak	Wilki Morskie Szczecin	
PLK Best Coach	(Poland) Arkadiusz Miłoszewski	Wilki Morskie Szczecin	
All-PLK Team	(Poland) Andrzej Mazurczak	Wilki Morskie Szczecin	
All-PLK Team	(United States) Jeremiah Martin	WKS Śląsk Wrocław	
All-PLK Team	(Poland) Przemyslaw Zolnierewicz	Zastal Zielona Góra	
All-PLK Team	(Poland) Aleksander Dziewa	WKS Śląsk Wrocław	
All-PLK Team	(Poland) Damian Kulig	Stal Ostrów Wielkopolski	

=== MVP of the Round ===
Gameday	Player	Team	EFF	Ref.
1	(Poland) Damian Kulig	Stal Ostrów Wielkopolski	35	
2	(United States) Jeremiah Martin	Śląsk Wrocław	28	
3	(Dominican Republic) Eddy Polanco	Astoria Bydgoszcz	38	
4	(Poland) Łukasz Kolenda	Śląsk Wrocław	33	
5	(Latvia) Klavs Cavars	Start Lublin	33	
6	(Poland) Damian Kulig (2)	Stal Ostrów Wielkopolski	34	
7	(United States) Jeremiah Martin (2)	Śląsk Wrocław	28	
8	(Poland) Michał Kolenda	Trefl Sopot	32	
9	(United States) Courtney Fortson	Spójnia Stargard	38	
10	(Poland) Damian Kulig (3)	Stal Ostrów Wielkopolski	32	
11	(United States) Jeremiah Martin (3)	Śląsk Wrocław	42	
12	(United States) Ben Simons	Astoria Bydgoszcz	36	
13	(Croatia) Ivan Ramljak	Śląsk Wrocław	26	
14	(United States) D.J. Fenner	Arka Gdynia	31	
15	(Poland) Filip Matczak	King Szczecin	19 & 26	
16	(Poland) Przemyslaw Zolnierewicz	Zastal Zielona Góra	32	
17	(United States) Gabe DeVoe	Start Lublin	39	
18	(United States) Courtney Fortson (2)	Spójnia Stargard	36	
19	(United States) Courtney Fortson (3)	Spójnia Stargard	32	
20	(Poland) Przemyslaw Zolnierewicz (2)	Zastal Zielona Góra	30	
21	(United States) Trey Wade	Arka Gdynia	35	
22	(Poland) Andrzej Pluta	Trefl Sopot	24	
23	(United States) Aric Holman	Legia Warsaw	35	
24	(United States) Bryce Alford	Zastal Zielona Góra	28	
25	(Poland) Andrzej Mazurczak	King Szczecin	38	
26	(United States) Kyle Vinales	Legia Warsaw	51	
27	(United States) James Florence	Arka Gdynia	18 & 16	
28	(United States) Scoochie Smith	Start Lublin	33	
29	(United States) Victor Sanders	Anwil Włocławek	32	

=== MVP of the Month ===
Month	Player	Team	EFF	Ref.
2022
September	(Poland) Damian Kulig	Stal Ostrów Wielkopolski	27.3	
October	(Poland) Damian Kulig	Stal Ostrów Wielkopolski	27.3	
November	(Poland) Aleksander Dziewa	Śląsk Wrocław	18.3	
December	(United States) Jeremiah Martin	Śląsk Wrocław	22.5	
2023
January	(United States) Courtney Fortson	Spójnia Stargard	20.0	
February	(Poland) Andrzej Mazurczak	King Szczecin	24.3	
March	(Poland) Andrzej Mazurczak	King Szczecin	24.3	

== Statistical leaders ==
Leaders at the end of the regular season.

Category	Player	Team	Value
Points per game	Jeremiah Martin	WKS Śląsk Wrocław	19.1
Rebounds per game	Adam Kemp	Sokół Łańcut	9.6
Assists per game	Courtney Fortson	Spójnia Stargard	8.4
Steals per game	Jeremiah Martin	WKS Śląsk Wrocław	2.4
Blocks per game	Adam Kemp	Sokół Łańcut	2.0
Evaluation per game	Jeremiah Martin	WKS Śląsk Wrocław	20.9

== Polish clubs in European competitions ==
Team	Competition	Progress
Śląsk Wroclaw	EuroCup	Regular Season
Legia Warsaw	Champions League	Regular Season
Anwil Włocławek	FIBA Europe Cup	Champions
Czarni Słupsk	FIBA Europe Cup	Qualifying rounds

== Polish clubs in Regional competitions ==
Team	Competition	Progress
Stal Ostrów Wielkopolski	European North Basketball League	Champions
Zastal Zielona Góra	European North Basketball League	Quarterfinals
Wilki Morskie Szczecin	European North Basketball League	Semifinals
Trefl Sopot	European North Basketball League	Regular Season
Start Lublin	European North Basketball League	Semifinals
MKS Dąbrowa Górnicza	Alpe Adria Cup	Champions
