= 2023–24 PLK season =

Orlen Basket Liga
- Season: 2023–24
- Dates: 21 September 2023 – 16 June 2024
- Teams: 16
- TV partner: Polsat Sport

Regular season
- Top seed: Anwil Włocławek
- Relegated: Sokół Łańcut

Finals
- Champions: Trefl Sopot (1st title)
- Runners-up: King Wilki Morskie Szczecin
- Third place: WKS Śląsk Wrocław
- Fourth place: Spójnia Stargard
- Finals MVP: (Poland) Jakub Schenk

Statistical leaders
Points	(United States) Liam O'Reilly	21.4
Rebounds	(Croatia) Mate Vucić	11.2
Assists	(United States) Tayler Persons	9.6
Index Rating	(Canada) Kadre Gray	21.8

Records
- Biggest home win: Stal Ostrów Wielkopolski 126–60 Zielona Góra (27 April 2024)
- Biggest away win: Arka Gdynia 78–117 Śląsk Wrocław (20 January 2024)
- Highest scoring: MKS Dąbrowa 122–115 GTK Gliwice (30 December 2023)
- All statistics correct as of complete.

The 2023–24 Polish Basketball League (PLK) season, the Orlen Basket Liga for sponsorship reasons, was the 90th season of the Polish Basketball League, the highest professional basketball league in Poland. King Wilki Morskie Szczecin were the defending champions.

== Teams ==
16 teams will participate this season.

Dziki Warsaw was promoted from Liga I and Astoria Bydgoszcz was relegated.

=== Locations and venues ===
Location of teams in the 2023–24 PLK season

Team	Location	Arena	Capacity
Anwil Włocławek	Włocławek	Hala Mistrzów	4,200
Arka Gdynia	Gdynia	Gdynia Sports Arena	5,500
Stal Ostrów Wielkopolski	Ostrów Wielkopolski	Arena Ostrów	3,086
Dziki Warsaw	Warsaw	Hala Koło	1,280
Czarni Słupsk	Slupsk	Hala Gryfia	2,500
GTK Gliwice	Gliwice	Gliwice Arena	13,752
King Wilki Morskie Szczecin	Szczecin	Netto Arena	7,403
Legia Warsaw	Warsaw	OSiR Bemowo	1,000
MKS Dąbrowa Górnicza	Dąbrowa Górnicza	Centrum Hall	2,944
Start Lublin	Lublin	Hala Globus	5,000
Sokół Łańcut	Łańcut	MOSiR Łańcut	1,200
Śląsk Wrocław	Wrocław	Hala Orbita	3,000
Spójnia Stargard	Stargard	Hala Miejska	2,500
Trefl Sopot	Sopot	Ergo Arena	15,000
Twarde Pierniki Toruń	Toruń	Arena Toruń	6,248
Zastal Enea Zielona Góra	Zielona Góra	CRS Hall	6,080

== Regular season ==
=== League table ===
Pos	Team	Pld	W	L	PF	PA	PD	Pts	Qualification or relegation
1	Anwil Włocławek	30	23	7	2585	2312	+273	53	Advanced to playoffs
2	Trefl Sopot (C)	30	21	9	2570	2385	+185	51	Advanced to playoffs
3	BM Slam Stal Ostrów Wielkopolski	30	19	11	2641	2417	+224	49	Advanced to playoffs
4	Wilki Morskie Szczecin	30	19	11	2701	2534	+167	49	Advanced to playoffs
5	Legia Warsaw	30	19	11	2587	2473	+114	49	Advanced to playoffs
6	Śląsk Wrocław	30	17	13	2393	2469	−76	47	Advanced to playoffs
7	MKS Dąbrowa Górnicza	30	16	14	2887	2755	+132	46	Advanced to playoffs
8	Spójnia Stargard	30	16	14	2453	2333	+120	46	Advanced to playoffs
9	Polski Cukier Pszczółka Start Lublin	30	16	14	2720	2707	+13	46	
10	Dziki Warsaw	30	16	14	2347	2382	−35	46	
11	Icon Sea Czarni Słupsk	30	14	16	2332	2395	−63	44	
12	Twarde Pierniki Toruń	30	13	17	2428	2520	−92	43	
13	Asseco Arka Gdynia	30	9	21	2452	2753	−301	39	
14	GTK Gliwice	30	9	21	2577	2729	−152	39	
15	Zastal Zielona Góra	30	8	22	2468	2737	−269	38	
16	Sewertronics Sokół Łańcut	30	5	25	2413	2653	−240	35	Relegated to I Liga

Source: PLK
(C) Champions

=== Results ===
Home \ Away	ANW	GDY	STA	CZA	DZI	GTK	LAN	SZC	LEG	MKS	TOR	SPO	LUB	SOP	WRO	ZIE
Anwil Włocławek	—	97–66	97–86	75–60	78–66	96–73	88–71	88–90	74–76	97–91	91–70	78–69	100–71	91–83	80–74	75–93
Krajowa Grupa Spożywcza Arka Gdynia	85–89	—	102–95	67–84	69–94	100–87	115–118	84–103	104–102	82–104	83–79	86–96	90–82	72–92	78–117	86–81
Arged BM Stal Ostrów Wielkopolski	89–87	89–79	—	106–77	68–75	89–96	89–77	86–95	71–53	103–102	98–80	77–73	96–93	70–71	108–51	126–60
Icon Sea Czarni Słupsk	58–83	93–82	65–85	—	59–66	72–81	92–90	74–78	82–80	92–90	90–65	61–81	77–81	74–65	78–53	73–69
Dziki Warsaw	67–95	83–81	86–65	83–96	—	87–88	93–85	75–84	96–86	82–76	78–56	70–67	86–71	75–80	71–80	61–74
Tauron GTK Gliwice	77–88	73–84	81–94	100–79	87–94	—	87–100	79–105	100–105	73–110	92–76	76–74	83–86	79–80	86–87	90–92
Muszynianka Domelo Sokół Łańcut	64–88	74–77	85–80	88–74	58–68	71–96	—	74–96	71–82	96–98	93–87	73–86	78–88	79–82	84–91	88–89
King Wilki Morskie Szczecin	92–93	91–73	81–85	82–86	90–72	112–86	85–79	—	84–85	86–106	70–92	101–103	81–85	79–84	89–84	95–84
Legia Warsaw	96–87	87–67	88–96	94–84	61–62	83–81	87–78	89–96	—	93–86	91–84	89–78	75–92	70–85	82–98	90–72
MKS Dąbrowa Górnicza	84–87	107–86	85–89	77–84	116–83	122–115	100–90	103–101	86–103	—	85–92	98–106	112–87	101–106	82–80	100–93
Arriva Polski Cukier Toruń	78–83	101–86	57–76	83–82	72–80	104–83	81–69	92–88	70–83	79–89	—	72–97	98–84	69–80	78–75	85–74
PGE Spójnia Stargard	64–70	91–54	65–62	77–65	64–56	86–76	77–56	69–78	81–87	83–93	73–84	—	86–81	80–73	93–67	94–72
Polski Cukier Start Lublin	88–80	98–88	78–100	77–86	111–84	100–93	99–83	93–98	92–112	114–102	102–85	110–108	—	84–85	102–85	91–95
Trefl Sopot	76–71	85–69	88–76	81–90	96–85	79–85	94–78	92–98	77–69	110–102	78–80	88–70	73–82	—	79–72	124–74
Śląsk Wrocław	82–96	88–79	103–95	67–65	78–72	80–75	98–79	60–83	68–97	72–76	78–69	75–69	97–95	66–87	—	77–66
Zastal Zielona Góra	73–83	73–78	87–92	89–80	91–97	94–99	86–84	79–90	71–92	91–104	89–110	105–93	91–103	85–97	76–80	—

Source: PLK
Legend: Blue = home team win; Red = away team win.
Matches with lighter background shading were decided after overtime.

== Playoffs ==
Quarterfinals and semifinals are played in a best-of-five format (2–2–1) while the finals in a best-of-seven one (2–2–1–1–1).

=== Bracket ===
Quarterfinals
1	Anwil Włocławek	2
8	Spójnia Stargard	3
4	King Wilki Morskie Szczecin	3
5	Legia Warsaw	1
2	Trefl Sopot	3
7	MKS Dąbrowa Górnicza	1
3	BM Slam Stal Ostrów Wielkopolski	2
6	WKS Śląsk Wrocław	3

Semifinals
4	King Wilki Morskie Szczecin	3
8	Spójnia Stargard	0
2	Trefl Sopot	3
6	WKS Śląsk Wrocław	1

Finals
2	Trefl Sopot	4
4	King Wilki Morskie Szczecin	3
Third place
6	WKS Śląsk Wrocław	175
8	Spójnia Stargard	168

=== Quarterfinals ===
Team 1	Series	Team 2	Game 1	Game 2	Game 3	Game 4	Game 5
Anwil Włocławek	2–3	Spójnia Stargard	89–70	98–84	82–86	68–86	77–81
Trefl Sopot	3–1	MKS Dąbrowa Górnicza	97–78	82–81	84–92	101–93	—
BM Slam Stal Ostrów Wielkopolski	2–3	WKS Śląsk Wrocław	76–85	81–64	97–102	84–74	81–83
King Wilki Morskie Szczecin	3–1	Legia Warsaw	85–80	80–77	88–90	99–84	—

=== Semifinals ===
Team 1	Series	Team 2	Game 1	Game 2	Game 3	Game 4	Game 5
King Wilki Morskie Szczecin	3–0	Spójnia Stargard	104–86	78–72	88–75	—	—
Trefl Sopot	3–1	WKS Śląsk Wrocław	78–54	88–70	70–76	81–77	—

=== Third place series ===
Team 1	Agg.	Team 2	1st leg	2nd leg
WKS Śląsk Wrocław	175–168	Spójnia Stargard	88–83	87–85

=== Finals ===
Team 1	Series	Team 2	Game 1	Game 2	Game 3	Game 4	Game 5	Game 6	Game 7
Trefl Sopot	4–3	King Wilki Morskie Szczecin	73–82	84–81	59–75	76–81	88–84	101–80	77–71

== Awards ==
All official awards of the 2023–24 PLK season.

=== Season awards ===
Award	Player	Team	Ref.
PLK Most Valuable Player	(United States) Victor Sanders	Anwil Włocławek	
PLK Finals MVP	(Poland) Jakub Schenk	Trefl Sopot	
PLK Best Defender	(United States) Amir Bell	Anwil Włocławek	
PLK Best Polish Player	(Poland) Andrzej Mazurczak	King Szczecin	
PLK Best Coach	(Poland) Przemysław Frasunkiewicz	Anwil Włocławek	
All-PLK Team	(Poland) Andrzej Mazurczak	King Szczecin	
All-PLK Team	(Latvia) Aigars Šķēle	BM Stal Ostrów Wielkopolski	
All-PLK Team	(United States) Christian Vital	Legia Warsaw	
All-PLK Team	(United States) Victor Sanders	Anwil Włocławek	
All-PLK Team	(United States) Aric Holman	Legia Warsaw	

=== MVP of the Month ===
Month	Player	Team	EFF	Ref.
2023
September	(United States) Victor Sanders	Anwil Włocławek	18.2	
October	(United States) Victor Sanders	Anwil Włocławek	18.2	
November	(United States) Josh Price	GTK Gliwice	23.8	
December	(Latvia) Aigars Šķēle	BM Stal Ostrów Wielkopolski	27.0	
2024
January	(United States) Dominic Green	Dziki Warsaw	19.8	
February	(Poland) Andrzej Mazurczak	King Szczecin	20.3	
March	(Poland) Andrzej Mazurczak	King Szczecin	20.3	

=== MVP of the Round ===
Gameday	Player	Team	EFF	Ref.
1	(United States) Jabril Durham	Polski Cukier Start Lublin	33	
2	(Poland) Damian Kulig	BM Stal Ostrów Wielkopolski	34	
3	(Serbia) Dušan Miletić	WKS Śląsk Wrocław	29	
4	(Poland) Aaron Cel	Twarde Pierniki Toruń	24	
5	(United States) Tayler Persons	MKS Dąbrowa Górnicza	31	
6	(United States) Barret Benson	Polski Cukier Start Lublin	36	
7	(United States) Joshua Price	GTK Gliwice	35	
8	(United States) Wesley Gordon	Spójnia Stargard	32	
9	(Lithuania) Arūnas Mikalauskas	BM Stal Ostrów Wielkopolski	33	
10	(Poland) Michał Michalak	Grupa Sierleccy Czarni Słupsk	19	
11	(Poland) Andrzej Pluta Jr.	Arka Gdynia	27	
12	(Poland) Daniel Gołębiowski	WKS Śląsk Wrocław	29	
13	(United States) Tayler Persons (x2)	MKS Dąbrowa Górnicza	35	
14	(United States) Aric Holman	Legia Warsaw	31	
15	(Lithuania) Arūnas Mikalauskas (x2)	BM Stal Ostrów Wielkopolski	26	
16	(Poland) Mikołaj Witliński	Trefl Sopot	23	
17	(United States) Lovell Cabbil	MKS Dąbrowa Górnicza	27	
18	(Poland) Jakub Nizioł	WKS Śląsk Wrocław	35	
19	(Poland) Liam O'Reilly	Polski Cukier Start Lublin	35	
20	(United States) Stephen Brown	Spójnia Stargard	35	
21	(Poland) Adrian Bogucki	Arka Gdynia	39	
22	(United States) Victor Sanders	Anwil Włocławek	27	
23	(Canada) Aaron Best	Trefl Sopot	31	
24	(Poland) Adam Hrycaniuk	Arka Gdynia	23	
25	(United States) Tyler Cheese	Sewertronics Sokół Łańcut	32	
26	(United States) Devon Daniels	Spójnia Stargard	23	
27	(United States) Zac Cuthbertson	King Szczecin	24	
28	(Poland) Liam O'Reilly (x2)	Polski Cukier Start Lublin	34	
29	(United States) Christian Vital	Legia Warsaw	34	
30	(United States) Loren Jackson	Legia Warsaw	32	

== Statistical leaders ==
Leaders at the end of the regular season.

Category	Player	Team	Value
Points per game	(United States) Liam O'Reilly	Polski Cukier Pszczółka Start Lublin	21.4
Rebounds per game	(Croatia) Mate Vucić	Twarde Pierniki Toruń	11.2
Assists per game	(United States) Tayler Persons	MKS Dąbrowa Górnicza	9.6
Steals per game	(United States) Jabril Durham	Polski Cukier Pszczółka Start Lublin	2.3
Blocks per game	(United States) Wesley Gordon	Spójnia Stargard	2.0
Evaluation per game	(Canada) Kadre Gray	GTK Gliwice	21.8

== Polish clubs in European competitions ==
Team	Competition	Progress
Śląsk Wroclaw	EuroCup	Regular Season
King Szczecin	Champions League	Regular Season
Legia Warsaw	Champions League	Qualifying rounds
Legia Warsaw	FIBA Europe Cup	Quarterfinals
Anwil Włocławek	FIBA Europe Cup	Regular Season
PGE Spójnia Stargard	FIBA Europe Cup	Regular Season

== Polish clubs in Regional competitions ==
Team	Competition	Progress
Enea Zastal Zielona Gora	European North Basketball League	Regular Season
Polski Cukier Start Lublin	European North Basketball League	Regular Season
MKS Dąbrowa Górnicza	Alpe Adria Cup	Champions
