= 2025–26 PLK season =

PLK
- Season: 2025–26
- Dates: 2 October 2025 – 21 June 2026
- Games played: 275
- Teams: 16
- TV partner: Polsat Sport

Regular season
- Top seed: Legia Warsaw
- Season MVP: (Poland) Andrzej Pluta Jr.
- Relegated: Miasto Szkła Krosno

Finals
- Champions: Legia Warsaw (9th title)
- Runners-up: Zastal Zielona Góra
- Third place: Dziki Warsaw
- Fourth place: Arka Gdynia
- Finals MVP: (Poland) Andrzej Pluta Jr.

Statistical leaders
Points	(United States) Landrius Horton	19.7
Rebounds	(United States) Wesley Gordon	8.9
Assists	(Serbia) Jovan Novak	8.4
Index Rating	(Slovenia) Aljaz Kunc	19.4

Records
- Biggest home win: Trefl Sopot 97–61 GTK Gliwice (2 November 2025); Trefl Sopot 97–61 Czarni Słupsk (28 December 2026)
- Biggest away win: Trefl Sopot 64–104 Dziki Warsaw (31 January 2026)
- Highest scoring: Twarde Toruń 113–106 Śląsk Wrocław (28 April 2026)

The 2025–26 Polish Basketball League (PLK) season, the Orlen Basket Liga for sponsorship reasons, is the 92nd season of the Polish Basketball League, the highest professional basketball league in Poland. Legia Warsaw were the defending champions.

== Teams ==
16 teams will participate this season.

Miasto Szkła Krosno was promoted from Liga I. and Spójnia Stargard was relegated after finishing in the last spot for 2024–25 PLK season.

=== Locations and venues ===
Location of teams in the 2025–26 PLK season

Team	Location	Arena	Capacity
Anwil Włocławek	Włocławek	Hala Mistrzów	3,963
Arka Gdynia	Gdynia	Gdynia Sports Arena	4,010
Dziki Warsaw	Warsaw	Hala Koło	1,298
Czarni Słupsk	Slupsk	Hala Gryfia	2,249
Trefl Sopot	Sopot	Ergo Arena	11,409
Górnik Wałbrzych	Wałbrzych	Aqua Zdrój	2,023
King Wilki Morskie Szczecin	Szczecin	Enea Arena	5,055
Legia Warsaw	Warsaw	OSiR Bemowo	1,991
MKS Dąbrowa Górnicza	Dąbrowa Górnicza	Centrum Hall	2,944
Miasto Szkła Krosno	Krosno	Hala MOSiR	1,690
Start Lublin	Lublin	Hala Globus	4,221
Śląsk Wrocław	Wrocław	Hala Orbita	3,000
Stal Ostrów Wielkopolski	Ostrów Wielkopolski	Arena Ostrów	3,086
GTK Gliwice	Gliwice	Gliwice Arena	3,360
Twarde Pierniki Toruń	Toruń	Kujawsko-Pomorska Arena Toruń	6,248
Zastal Zielona Góra	Zielona Góra	CRS Hall	5,080

== Regular season ==
=== Supercup ===
On September 28, 2025 Start Lublin won the Polish Super Cup, defeating Trefl Sopot 82–77 in the final played at the OSiR Bemowo Hall in Warsaw. In final four also played Legia Warsaw and Górnik Wałbrzych.

=== League table ===
Pos	Team	Pld	W	L	PF	PA	PD	Pts	Qualification or relegation
1	Legia Warsaw (C)	30	22	8	2603	2401	+202	52	Advanced to playoffs
2	King Wilki Morskie Szczecin	30	21	9	2538	2479	+59	51	Advanced to playoffs
3	Śląsk Wrocław	30	20	10	2687	2537	+150	50	Advanced to playoffs
4	Trefl Sopot	30	19	11	2640	2534	+106	49	Advanced to playoffs
5	Dziki Warsaw	30	18	12	2726	2549	+177	48	Advanced to playoffs
6	Arka Gdynia	30	18	12	2570	2465	+105	48	Advanced to playoffs
7	Anwil Włocławek	30	17	13	2653	2537	+116	47	Advanced to playins
8	Zastal Zielona Góra	30	16	14	2538	2438	+100	46	Advanced to playins
9	MKS Dąbrowa Górnicza	30	16	14	2651	2600	+51	46	Advanced to playins
10	Stal Ostrów Wielkopolski	30	16	14	2485	2524	−39	46	Advanced to playins
11	Górnik Wałbrzych	30	15	15	2464	2532	−68	45	
12	Twarde Pierniki Toruń	30	12	18	2647	2716	−69	42	
13	Start Lublin	30	10	20	2489	2717	−228	40	
14	Czarni Słupsk	30	9	21	2491	2621	−130	39	
15	GTK Gliwice	30	7	23	2419	2676	−257	37	
16	Miasto Szkła Krosno (R)	30	4	26	2449	2724	−275	34	Relegated to I Liga

Source: PLK
(C) Champions; (R) Relegated

=== Results ===
Home \ Away	ANW	TOR	GDY	DZI	SOP	WAL	CZA	SZC	LEG	KRO	MKS	LUB	STA	GTK	WRO	ZIE
Anwil Włocławek	—	87–98	98–108	105–96	94–79	97–90	91–80	92–94	83–91	99–93	89–78	90–81	90–81	93–58	96–83	79–70
Twarde Pierniki Toruń	95–101	—	95–86	82–83	95–86	73–96	98–111	68–77	67–82	112–105	93–105	97–88	109–79	90–88	113–106	95–81
Arka Gdynia	82–97	94–86	—	78–96	80–77	85–69	74–66	78–91	106–73	95–76	92–84	75–87	90–83	76–59	101–87	71–82
Dziki Warsaw	78–73	110–91	94–84	—	80–86	78–84	106–86	85–96	88–95	90–85	96–93	103–72	80–61	108–83	81–82	98–86
Trefl Sopot	83–74	92–72	83–85	64–104	—	84–77	97–61	84–74	93–100	94–81	77–100	103–97	88–86	97–61	93–81	78–75
Górnik Wałbrzych	61–86	64–71	103–97	71–69	91–100	—	90–107	97–76	81–79	90–74	73–103	81–86	80–72	90–81	85–83	82–89
Czarni Słupsk	57–68	103–93	76–90	96–102	72–76	88–92	—	101–76	87–82	85–81	88–102	98–72	86–93	80–89	86–91	63–95
King Wilki Morskie Szczecin	84–74	90–82	90–81	91–88	85–96	64–77	84–83	—	83–81	88–85	102–89	81–75	97–72	85–78	90–81	80–66
Legia Warsaw	80–75	82–81	91–84	79–84	78–88	93–68	87–76	88–84	—	82–68	84–63	90–68	98–89	93–66	99–104	84–66
Miasto Szkła Krosno	87–101	81–88	60–78	80–95	85–105	86–70	77–91	72–82	87–94	—	92–87	81–82	80–87	88–87	66–88	87–99
MKS Dąbrowa Górnicza	85–94	90–79	70–83	95–82	93–81	79–96	83–71	102–93	85–90	91–89	—	105–100	91–84	88–72	80–99	91–86
Start Lublin	97–91	90–85	80–101	76–101	84–105	85–79	101–96	83–74	52–84	87–95	81–78	—	76–91	86–82	91–98	77–91
Stal Ostrów Wielkopolski	104–89	77–75	84–82	73–83	89–80	86–74	75–68	81–76	75–83	92–89	77–91	93–78	—	96–93	93–72	75–82
GTK Gliwice	87–86	107–99	66–89	88–82	92–96	82–92	73–85	86–93	81–89	98–75	80–90	95–93	73–76	—	86–93	62–86
Śląsk Wrocław	86–79	87–75	87–68	109–100	96–85	100–75	87–64	80–83	98–84	89–60	95–90	98–91	73–77	84–85	—	90–85
Zastal Zielona Góra	91–82	88–90	75–77	105–86	92–90	79–86	96–80	74–75	71–88	98–84	82–70	76–73	98–84	98–81	76–80	—

Source: PLK
Legend: Blue = home team win; Red = away team win.
Matches with lighter background shading were decided after overtime.

== Play-in ==
Under the new format, the 7th to 10th-ranked teams faced each other in the play-in. Each game is hosted by the team with the higher regular season record. The format was similar to the first two rounds of the Page–McIntyre system for a four-team playoff that was identical to that of the NBA play-in tournament. First, the 7th seed will host the 8th seed, with the winner advancing to the playoffs as the 7th seed; likewise the 9th seed will host the 10th seed, with the loser eliminated. Then the loser of the 7-v-8 game will host the winner of the 9-v-10 game, with the winner of that game getting the final playoff spot, as the 8th seed.

Play-in games
7	Anwil Włocławek	71
8	Zastal Zielona Góra	86
9	MKS Dąbrowa Górnicza	94
10	Stal Ostrów Wielkopolski	86

No. 8 seed game
7	Anwil Włocławek	84
9	MKS Dąbrowa Górnicza	87

Final seeds
Zastal Zielona Góra	No. 7 seed
MKS Dąbrowa Górnicza	No. 8 seed

== Playoffs ==
Quarterfinals and semifinals are played in a best-of-five format (2–2–1) while the finals in a best-of-seven one (2–2–1–1–1).

=== Bracket ===
Quarterfinals
1	Legia Warsaw	3
8	MKS Dąbrowa Górnicza	1
4	Trefl Sopot	1
5	Dziki Warsaw	3
2	King Wilki Morskie Szczecin	1
7	Zastal Zielona Góra	3
3	Śląsk Wrocław	2
6	Arka Gdynia	3

Semifinals
1	Legia Warsaw	3
5	Dziki Warsaw	0
6	Arka Gdynia	0
7	Zastal Zielona Góra	3

Finals
1	Legia Warsaw	4
7	Zastal Zielona Góra	3
Third place
5	Dziki Warsaw	176
6	Arka Gdynia	167

=== Quarterfinals ===
Team 1	Series	Team 2	Game 1	Game 2	Game 3	Game 4	Game 5
Legia Warsaw	3–1	MKS Dąbrowa Górnicza	100–66	89–84	91–92	98–86	—
King Wilki Morskie Szczecin	1–3	Zastal Zielona Góra	80–78	79–82	70–84	80–86	—
Śląsk Wrocław	2–3	Arka Gdynia	87–84 (OT)	92–82	75–86	84–86 (OT)	54–71
Trefl Sopot	1–3	Dziki Warsaw	92–107	81–78	78–85	73–88	—

=== Semifinals ===
Team 1	Series	Team 2	Game 1	Game 2	Game 3	Game 4	Game 5
Legia Warsaw	3–0	Dziki Warsaw	98–80	78–76	91–78	—	—
Arka Gdynia	0–3	Zastal Zielona Góra	64–90	83–85	89–96	—	—

=== Third place series ===
Team 1	Agg.	Team 2	1st leg	2nd leg
Dziki Warsaw	176–167	Arka Gdynia	84–89	92–78

=== Finals ===
Team 1	Series	Team 2	Game 1	Game 2	Game 3	Game 4	Game 5	Game 6	Game 7
Legia Warsaw	4–3	Zastal Zielona Góra	74−77	104−82	79–63	73−85	84–80	74–76	78–70

== Awards ==
All official awards of the 2025–26 PLK season.

=== Season awards ===
Award	Player	Team	Ref.
PLK Most Valuable Player	(Poland) Andrzej Pluta Jr.	Legia Warsaw	
PLK Finals MVP	(Poland) Andrzej Pluta Jr.	Legia Warsaw	
PLK Best Defender	(United States) Quan Jackson	Tasomix Rosiek Stal Ostrów Wielkopolski	
PLK Best Polish Player	(Poland) Andrzej Pluta Jr.	Legia Warsaw	
PLK Best Coach	(Poland) Maciej Majcherek	Wilki Morskie Szczecin	
All-PLK Team	(Poland) Andrzej Pluta Jr.	Legia Warsaw	
All-PLK Team	(United States) Landrius Horton	Dziki Warsaw	
All-PLK Team	(Canada) Noah Kirkwood	WKS Śląsk Wrocław	
All-PLK Team	(Poland) Jakub Szumert	Orlen Zastal Zielona Góra	
All-PLK Team	(Serbia) Nemanja Popović	Wilki Morskie Szczecin	

=== MVP of the Month ===
Month	Player	Team	EFF	Ref.
2025
October	(United States) Paul Scruggs	Energa Trefl Sopot	19.3	
November	(United States) Landrius Horton	Dziki Warsaw	24.3	
December	(Poland) Jakub Szumert	ORLEN Zastal Zielona Góra	18.5	
2026
January	(Canada) Kadre Gray	WKS Śląsk Wrocław	17.0	
February	(Poland) Andrzej Pluta	Legia Warsaw	17.7	
March	(Poland) Andrzej Pluta	Legia Warsaw	17.7	
April	(Iceland) Elvar Már Friðriksson	Anwil Włocławek	20.0	

=== MVP of the Round ===
Gameday	Player	Team	EFF	Ref.
1	(Iceland) Elvar Már Friðriksson	Anwil Włocławek	29	
2	(United States) Anthony Roberts	King Szczecin	29	
3	(United States) Lovell Cabbil	Górnik Zamek Książ Wałbrzych	17	
4	(Poland) Przemysław Żołnierewicz	King Szczecin	23	
5	(Poland) Szymon Tomczak	Energa Czarni Słupsk	24	
6	(United States) Landrius Horton	Dziki Warsaw	34	
7	(United States) Jeremy Roach	King Szczecin	21	
8	(Serbia) Stefan Đorđević	WKS Śląsk Wrocław	26	
9	(Poland) Daniel Gołębiowski	Tasomix Rosiek Stal Ostrów Wielkopolski	30	
10	(United States) Lovell Cabbil (x2)	Górnik Zamek Książ Wałbrzych	17	
11	(United States) Paul Scruggs	Energa Trefl Sopot	34	
12	(Canada) Luka Šakota	Tasomix Rosiek Stal Ostrów Wielkopolski	29	
13	(Serbia) Aleksandar Langović	Arriva LOTTO Twarde Pierniki Toruń	35	
14	(Latvia) Mareks Mejeris	Tasomix Rosiek Stal Ostrów Wielkopolski	26	
15	(Poland) Szymon Zapała	Energa Trefl Sopot	19	
16	(Canada) Kadre Gray	WKS Śląsk Wrocław	19	
17	(Poland) Jakub Musiał	MKS Dąbrowa Górnicza	20	
18	(United States) Ben Shungu	Miasto Szkła Krosno	26	
19	(Poland) Jakub Szumert	ORLEN Zastal Zielona Góra	37	
20	(United States) Liam O'Reilly	PGE Start Lublin	39	
21	(United States) Jorden Duffy	Energa Czarni Słupsk	24	
22	(United States) Luther Muhammad	MKS Dąbrowa Górnicza	25	
23	(United States) Lovell Cabbil (x3)	Górnik Zamek Książ Wałbrzych	45	
24	(Poland) Mateusz Szlachetka	Arriva LOTTO Twarde Pierniki Toruń	23	
25	(Iceland) Elvar Már Friðriksson (x2)	Anwil Włocławek	36	
26	(United States) Tyler Wahl	Anwil Włocławek	40	
27	(Serbia) Jovan Novak	King Szczecin	26	
28	(Iceland) Elvar Már Friðriksson (x3)	Anwil Włocławek	36	
29	(Poland) Kuba Piśla	GTK Gliwice	30	
30	(Poland) Damian Kulig	Arriva LOTTO Twarde Pierniki Toruń	39	

== Polish clubs in European competitions ==
Team	Competition	Progress
Śląsk Wrocław	EuroCup	Regular Season
Legia Warsaw	Champions League	Regular Season
Start Lublin	Champions League	Qualifying rounds
Start Lublin	FIBA Europe Cup	Regular Season
Trefl Sopot	FIBA Europe Cup	Second Round
Anwil Włocławek	FIBA Europe Cup	Regular Season

== Polish clubs in Regional competitions ==
Team	Competition	Progress
Dziki Warsaw	European North Basketball League	Champions
