= 2020–21 PLK season =

Energa Basket Liga
- Season: 2020–21
- Dates: 27 August 2020 – 6 May 2021
- Teams: 16
- TV partner: Polsat Sport

Regular season
- Top seed: Zastal Zielona Góra
- Season MVP: (United States) Geoffrey Groselle
- Relegated: Polpharma Starogard Gdański

Finals
- Champions: Arged BM Slam Stal Ostrów Wielkopolski (1st title)
- Runners-up: Enea Zastal BC Zielona Góra
- Third place: WKS Śląsk Wrocław
- Fourth place: Legia Warszawa
- Finals MVP: (Poland) Jakub Garbacz

Statistical leaders
| Points | (United States) Jabarie Hinds | 21.7 |
| Rebounds | (Croatia) Ivica Radić | 9.1 |
| Assists | (United States) Corey Sanders | 7.4 |
| Index Rating | (United States) Geoffrey Groselle | 22.3 |
- All statistics correct as of complete.

The 2020–21 Polish Basketball League (PLK) season, the Energa Basket Liga for sponsorship reasons, was the 87th season of the Polish Basketball League, the highest professional basketball league in Poland. Stelmet Enea Zielona Góra were the defending champions.

Arged BM Slam Stal Ostrów Wielkopolski won its first ever national championship.

== Teams ==
16 teams were scheduled to participate this season. Due to the coronavirus pandemic, there were no relegation or promotion.

=== Locations and venues ===
Location of teams in the 2020–21 PLK season

| Team | Location | Arena | Capacity |
|---|---|---|---|
| Anwil Włocławek | Włocławek | Hala Mistrzów | 4,200 |
| Asseco Arka Gdynia | Gdynia | Gdynia Sports Arena | 5,500 |
| BM Slam Stal Ostrów Wielkopolski | Ostrów Wielkopolski | Hala Sportowa Stal | 1,200 |
| Enea Astoria | Bydgoszcz | Artego Arena | 1,470 |
| GTK Gliwice | Gliwice | Gliwice Arena | 13,752 |
| GTK Gliwice | Gliwice | Mała Arena | 1,092 |
| HydroTruck Radom | Radom | ZSE Radom | 1,200 |
| Legia Warsaw | Warsaw | OSiR Bemowo | 1,000 |
| MKS Dąbrowa Górnicza | Dąbrowa Górnicza | Centrum Hall | 2,944 |
| Polpharma Starogard Gdański | Starogard Gdański | Argo-Kociewie | 2,500 |
| Polski Cukier Toruń | Toruń | Arena Toruń | 6,248 |
| Śląsk Wrocław | Wrocław | Hala Orbita | 3,000 |
| Spójnia Stargard | Stargard | Hala Miejska | 2,500 |
| TBV Start Lublin | Lublin | Hala Globus | 5,000 |
| Trefl Sopot | Sopot | Ergo Arena | 15,000 |
| Wilki Morskie Szczecin | Szczecin | Azoty Arena | 7,403 |
| Zastal Zielona Góra | Zielona Góra | CRS Hall | 6,080 |

== Regular season ==
=== League table ===
| Pos | Team | Pld | W | L | PF | PA | PD | Pts | Qualification or relegation |
|---|---|---|---|---|---|---|---|---|---|
| 1 | Zastal Zielona Góra | 30 | 27 | 3 | 2853 | 2357 | +496 | 57 | Advance to playoffs |
| 2 | Legia Warszawa | 30 | 21 | 9 | 2540 | 2306 | +234 | 51 | Advance to playoffs |
| 3 | BM Slam Stal Ostrów Wielkopolski (C) | 30 | 20 | 10 | 2547 | 2384 | +163 | 50 | Advance to playoffs |
| 4 | WKS Śląsk Wrocław | 30 | 20 | 10 | 2513 | 2377 | +136 | 50 | Advance to playoffs |
| 5 | Trefl Sopot | 30 | 19 | 11 | 2531 | 2379 | +152 | 49 | Advance to playoffs |
| 6 | Start Lublin | 30 | 17 | 13 | 2433 | 2414 | +19 | 47 | Advance to playoffs |
| 7 | King Szczecin | 30 | 17 | 13 | 2354 | 2415 | −61 | 47 | Advance to playoffs |
| 8 | Spójnia Stargard | 30 | 16 | 14 | 2505 | 2472 | +33 | 46 | Advance to playoffs |
| 9 | MKS Dąbrowa Górnicza | 30 | 14 | 16 | 2470 | 2539 | −69 | 44 | |
| 10 | Polski Cukier Toruń | 30 | 12 | 18 | 2579 | 2623 | −44 | 42 | |
| 11 | Enea Astoria Bydgoszcz | 30 | 12 | 18 | 2572 | 2677 | −105 | 42 | |
| 12 | GTK Gliwice | 30 | 11 | 19 | 2455 | 2550 | −95 | 41 | |
| 13 | Anwil Włocławek | 30 | 10 | 20 | 2481 | 2580 | −99 | 40 | |
| 14 | HydroTruck Radom | 30 | 10 | 20 | 2333 | 2485 | −152 | 40 | |
| 15 | Asseco Arka Gdynia | 30 | 8 | 22 | 2233 | 2584 | −351 | 38 | |
| 16 | Polpharma Starogard Gdański | 30 | 6 | 24 | 2558 | 2815 | −257 | 36 | Relegation to I Liga |

Source: PLK
(C) Champions

=== Results ===
| Home \ Away | ANW | GDY | WRO | STA | GTK | RAD | LEG | BYD | MKS | POL | TOR | SPO | LUB | SOP | SZC | ZIE |
|---|---|---|---|---|---|---|---|---|---|---|---|---|---|---|---|---|
| Anwil Włocławek | — | 86–78 | 93–78 | 90–71 | 98–82 | 97–86 | 86–78 | 90–71 | 98–101 | 89–96 | 77–75 | 84–96 | 78–94 | 74–89 | 75–78 | 67–90 |
| Arka Gdynia | 80–84 | — | 63–102 | 74–64 | 94–84 | 76–70 | 83–92 | 75–78 | 85–76 | 92–90 | 72–88 | 82–92 | 68–79 | 71–100 | 95–74 | 76–104 |
| WKS Śląsk Wrocław | 107–77 | 110–76 | — | 98–97 | 80–72 | 75–97 | 73–68 | 90–66 | 71–82 | 107–75 | 82–70 | 95–94 | 91–77 | 82–85 | 91–73 | 58–78 |
| BM Slam Stal Ostrów Wielkopolski | 88–79 | 87–54 | 76–72 | — | 83–61 | 94–89 | 89–81 | 78–86 | 83–70 | 81–75 | 85–80 | 98–105 | 79–74 | 95–73 | 91–59 | 90–80 |
| GTK Gliwice | 81–87 | 97–89 | 85–91 | 81–102 | — | 75–83 | 80–89 | 91–83 | 77–84 | 91–77 | 88–74 | 84–78 | 85–80 | 95–82 | 81–72 | 86–92 |
| HydroTruck Radom | 70–64 | 84–73 | 67–87 | 73–83 | 87–80 | — | 71–70 | 72–85 | 81–74 | 77–85 | 99–80 | 73–75 | 65–76 | 60–80 | 83–73 | 70–93 |
| Legia Warsaw | 85–76 | 76–69 | 67–69 | 89–73 | 95–85 | 79–57 | — | 98–81 | 93–70 | 104–93 | 84–64 | 77–73 | 74–72 | 78–72 | 137–43 | 78–85 |
| Enea Astoria Bydgoszcz | 99–96 | 103–73 | 91–83 | 88–109 | 68–88 | 92–97 | 85–75 | — | 90–78 | 94–89 | 98–92 | 84–88 | 89–92 | 77–82 | 73–83 | 87–101 |
| MKS Dąbrowa Górnicza | 87–84 | 78–80 | 82–88 | 93–100 | 86–74 | 87–84 | 89–79 | 89–86 | — | 102–90 | 81–74 | 99–90 | 81–78 | 72–81 | 89–93 | 69–97 |
| Polpharma Starogard Gdański | 102–95 | 102–67 | 87–103 | 67–72 | 92–81 | 93–85 | 90–97 | 77–98 | 91–99 | — | 87–94 | 93–106 | 91–100 | 92–117 | 80–88 | 77–103 |
| Polski Cukier Toruń | 94–85 | 94–79 | 91–96 | 83–96 | 78–65 | 81–67 | 94–102 | 112–102 | 94–99 | 99–90 | — | 108–95 | 104–98 | 88–83 | 102–83 | 94–88 |
| Spójnia Stargard | 77–67 | 80–64 | 73–74 | 84–83 | 84–78 | 84–71 | 73–79 | 86–95 | 82–67 | 71–60 | 86–79 | — | 70–65 | 83–63 | 64–72 | 80–97 |
| Start Lublin | 78–74 | 76–61 | 79–76 | 62–82 | 70–75 | 86–78 | 79–82 | 107–101 | 76–74 | 82–78 | 82–73 | 87–86 | — | 80–91 | 94–85 | 90–103 |
| Trefl Sopot | 96–83 | 73–78 | 79–60 | 82–66 | 80–110 | 80–70 | 74–81 | 107–78 | 72–66 | 110–76 | 96–67 | 91–81 | 70–76 | — | 77–82 | 71–76 |
| King Szczecin | 80–71 | 82–50 | 79–65 | 77–67 | 100–70 | 97–87 | 60–70 | 75–68 | 73–67 | 101–74 | 74–71 | 105–80 | 70–78 | 81–83 | — | 80–99 |
| Zastal Zielona Góra | 93–77 | 104–58 | 80–84 | 105–85 | 92–73 | 101–80 | 98–83 | 104–76 | 95–79 | 110–89 | 94–82 | 98–89 | 90–75 | 101–82 | 92–72 | — |

Source: PLK
Legend: Blue = home team win; Red = away team win.

== Playoffs ==
Quarterfinals and semifinals are played in a best-of-five format (2–2–1) while the finals in a best-of-seven one (2–2–1–1–1).

=== Bracket ===
Quarterfinals
1 | Zastal Zielona Góra | 3
8 | Spójnia Stargard | 1
4 | WKS Śląsk Wrocław | 3
5 | Trefl Sopot | 1
2 | Legia Warszawa | 3
7 | King Szczecin | 1
3 | BM Slam Stal Ostrów Wielkopolski | 3
6 | Start Lublin | 1

Semifinals
1 | Zastal Zielona Góra | 3
4 | WKS Śląsk Wrocław | 0
2 | Legia Warszawa | 0
3 | BM Slam Stal Ostrów Wielkopolski | 3

Finals
1 | Zastal Zielona Góra | 2
3 | BM Slam Stal Ostrów Wielkopolski | 4
Third place
2 | Legia Warszawa | 1
4 | WKS Śląsk Wrocław | 2

=== Quarterfinals ===
| Team 1 | Series | Team 2 | Game 1 | Game 2 | Game 3 | Game 4 | Game 5 |
|---|---|---|---|---|---|---|---|
| Zastal Zielona Góra | 3–1 | Spójnia Stargard | 90–70 | 89–74 | 77–82 | 91–80 | — |
| Legia Warszawa | 3–1 | King Szczecin | 99–91 | 90–67 | 81–88 | 79–72 | — |
| BM Slam Stal Ostrów Wielkopolski | 3–1 | Start Lublin | 106–81 | 94–100 | 87–83 | 109–101 | — |
| WKS Śląsk Wrocław | 3–1 | Trefl Sopot | 76–71 | 91–72 | 90–92 | 83–81 | — |

=== Semifinals ===
| Team 1 | Series | Team 2 | Game 1 | Game 2 | Game 3 | Game 4 | Game 5 |
|---|---|---|---|---|---|---|---|
| Zastal Zielona Góra | 3–0 | WKS Śląsk Wrocław | 97–90 | 87–76 | 80–75 | — | — |
| Legia Warszawa | 0–3 | BM Slam Stal Ostrów Wielkopolski | 80–85 | 67–80 | 87–95 | — | — |

=== Third place series ===
| Team 1 | Series | Team 2 | Game 1 | Game 2 | Game 3 |
|---|---|---|---|---|---|
| Legia Warszawa | 1–2 | WKS Śląsk Wrocław | 84–72 | 73–84 | 85–86 |

=== Finals ===
| Team 1 | Series | Team 2 | Game 1 | Game 2 | Game 3 | Game 4 | Game 5 | Game 6 | Game 7 |
|---|---|---|---|---|---|---|---|---|---|
| Zastal Zielona Góra | 2–4 | BM Slam Stal Ostrów Wielkopolski | 89–75 | 71–87 | 81–90 | 80–95 | 105–101 | 85–92 | — |

== Awards ==
All official awards of the 2020–21 PLK season.

=== Season awards ===
| Award | Player | Team | Ref. |
|---|---|---|---|
| PLK Most Valuable Player | (United States) Geoffrey Groselle | Zastal Zielona Góra | |
| PLK Finals MVP | (Poland) Jakub Garbacz | BM Slam Stal Ostrów Wielkopolski | |
| PLK Best Defender | (Croatia) Ivan Ramljak | Śląsk Wrocław | |
| PLK Best Polish Player | (Poland) Jakub Garbacz | BM Slam Stal Ostrów Wielkopolski | |
| PLK Best Coach | (Croatia) Žan Tabak | Zastal Zielona Góra | |
| All-PLK Team | (Denmark) Gabriel Lundberg | Zastal Zielona Góra | |
| All-PLK Team | (United States) Lee Moore | MKS Dąbrowa Górnicza | |
| All-PLK Team | (Poland) Jakub Garbacz | BM Slam Stal Ostrów Wielkopolski | |
| All-PLK Team | (Latvia) Rolands Freimanis | Zastal Zielona Góra | |
| All-PLK Team | (United States) Geoffrey Groselle | Zastal Zielona Góra | |

=== MVP of the Round ===
| Gameday | Player | Team | EFF | Ref. |
|---|---|---|---|---|
| 1 | (United States) Deishuan Booker | Anwil Włocławek | 24 | |
| 2 | (Poland) Mateusz Zębski | Wilki Morskie Szczecin | 27 | |
| 3 | (Poland) Kacper Borowski | Start Lublin | 23 | |
| 4 | (Poland) Krzysztof Szubarga | Arka Gdynia | 18 | |
| 5 | (United States) Nick Neal | HydroTruck Radom | 35 | |
| 6 | (Poland) Przemyslaw Zolnierewicz | Asseco Arka Gdynia | 28 & 14 | |
| 7 | (Poland) Damian Kulig | Polski Cukier Toruń | 27 | |
| 8 | (Poland) Aaron Cel | Polski Cukier Toruń | 31 & 23 | |
| 9 | (Poland) Jakub Karolak | Legia Warszawa | 31 | |
| 10 | (United States) Lee Moore | MKS Dąbrowa Górnicza | 42 & 15 | |
| 11 | (Poland) Aleksander Dziewa | WKS Śląsk Wrocław | 26 & 22 | |
| 12 | (Poland) Filip Matczak | PGE Spójnia Stargard | 36 | |
| 13 | (United States) McKenzie Moore | Anwil Włocławek | 39 | |
| 14 | (Poland) Przemysław Żołnierewicz (2) | Arka Gdynia | 24 & 17 | |
| 15 | (United States) Geoffrey Groselle | Zastal Zielona Góra | 41 | |
| 16 | (Latvia) Martins Laksa | Start Lublin | 32 | |
| 17 | (Poland) Jakub Garbacz | Arged BM Slam Stal Ostrów | 22 | |
| 18 | (Poland) Jakub Garbacz (2) | Arged BM Slam Stal Ostrów | 15 & 23 | |
| 19 | (Poland) Mateusz Zębski (2) | Wilki Morskie Szczecin | 27 | |
| 20 | (Poland) Andrzej Mazurczak | MKS Dąbrowa Górnicza | 34 | |
| 21 | (United States) Lester Medford | Legia Warszawa | 38 | |
| 22 | (Poland) Łukasz Kolenda | Trefl Sopot | 22 | |
| 23 | (United States) Jabarie Hinds | HydroTruck Radom | 39 | |
| 24 | (Poland) Aleksander Dziewa (2) | WKS Śląsk Wrocław | 25 | |
| 25 | (Poland) Andrzej Mazurczak (2) | MKS Dąbrowa Górnicza | 26 | |
| 26 | (Poland) Aleksander Dziewa (3) | WKS Śląsk Wrocław | 25 | |
| 27 | (Poland) Paweł Leończyk | Trefl Sopot | 28 & 25 | |

=== MVP of the Month ===
| Month | Player | Team | EFF | Ref. |
2020
| October | (Poland) Damian Kulig | Polski Cukier Toruń | 20.7 | |
| November | (Poland) Aleksander Dziewa | WKS Śląsk Wrocław | 20.6 | |
| December | (Poland) Jakub Garbacz | Arged BM Slam Stal Ostrów | 17.8 | |
2021
| January | (Poland) Jakub Garbacz | Arged BM Slam Stal Ostrów | 19.3 | |
| February | Not awarded | | | |
| March | (United States) Chris Smith | Arged BM Slam Stal Ostrów | 21.2 | |

== Polish clubs in European competitions ==
| Team | Competition | Progress |
|---|---|---|
| Start Lublin | Champions League | Regular season |
| Anwil Włocławek | Champions League | Qualifying rounds |
| Anwil Włocławek | FIBA Europe Cup | Round of 16 |
| Stal Ostrów Wielkopolski | FIBA Europe Cup | Finalist |

== Polish clubs in Regional competitions ==
| Team | Competition | Progress |
|---|---|---|
| Zastal Zielona Góra | VTB United League | Quarterfinalist |
| Śląsk Wroclaw | Alpe Adria Cup | Cancelled |
| Legia Warsaw | Alpe Adria Cup | Cancelled |
