= 2024–25 PLK season =

Orlen Basket Liga
- Season: 2024–25
- Dates: 3 October 2024 – 22 June 2025
- Games played: 277
- Teams: 16
- TV partner: Polsat Sport

Regular season
- Top seed: Anwil Włocławek
- Season MVP: (United States) Kameron McGusty
- Relegated: Spójnia Stargard

Finals
- Champions: Legia Warsaw (8th title)
- Runners-up: PGE Start Lublin
- Third place: Trefl Sopot
- Fourth place: Anwil Włocławek
- Finals MVP: (United States) Kameron McGusty

Statistical leaders
| Points | (United States) Kameron McGusty | 19.9 |
| Rebounds | (Serbia) Stefan Đorđević | 8.9 |
| Assists | (Serbia) Jovan Novak | 9.6 |
| Index Rating | (Serbia) Stefan Đorđević | 24.2 |

Records
- Biggest home win: Dziki Warsaw 88–63 Stal Ostrów Wielkopolski (5 October 2024)
- Biggest away win: Legia Warsaw 70–99 Trefl Sopot (12 April 2025)
- Highest scoring: GTK Gliwice 110–105 Start Lublin (24 October 2024)

The 2024–25 Polish Basketball League (PLK) season, the Orlen Basket Liga for sponsorship reasons, is the 91st season of the Polish Basketball League, the highest professional basketball league in Poland. Trefl Sopot are the defending champions.

== Teams ==
16 teams will participate this season.

Górnik Wałbrzych was promoted from Liga I after spending 14 years in the lower leagues and Sokół Łańcut was relegated.

=== Locations and venues ===
Location of teams in the 2024–25 PLK season

| Team | Location | Arena | Capacity |
|---|---|---|---|
| Anwil Włocławek | Włocławek | Hala Mistrzów | 3,963 |
| Arka Gdynia | Gdynia | Gdynia Sports Arena | 4,020 |
| Dziki Warsaw | Warsaw | Hala Koło | 1,298 |
| Czarni Słupsk | Slupsk | Hala Gryfia | 2,249 |
| Górnik Wałbrzych | Wałbrzych | Aqua Zdrój | 2,023 |
| King Wilki Morskie Szczecin | Szczecin | Enea Arena | 5,055 |
| Legia Warsaw | Warsaw | OSiR Bemowo | 1,991 |
| MKS Dąbrowa Górnicza | Dąbrowa Górnicza | Centrum Hall | 2,944 |
| Start Lublin | Lublin | Hala Globus | 4,221 |
| Śląsk Wrocław | Wrocław | Hala Orbita | 3,000 |
| Spójnia Stargard | Stargard | Hala Miejska | 1,937 |
| Stal Ostrów Wielkopolski | Ostrów Wielkopolski | Arena Ostrów | 3,086 |
| GTK Gliwice | Gliwice | Gliwice Arena (small arena) | 1,092 |
| Trefl Sopot | Sopot | Ergo Arena | 10,731 |
| Twarde Pierniki Toruń | Toruń | Arena Toruń | 6,248 |
| Zastal Zielona Góra | Zielona Góra | CRS Hall | 5,080 |

== Regular season ==
=== League table ===
| Pos | Team | Pld | W | L | PF | PA | PD | Pts | Qualification or relegation |
|---|---|---|---|---|---|---|---|---|---|
| 1 | Anwil Włocławek | 30 | 24 | 6 | 2672 | 2418 | +254 | 54 | Advanced to playoffs |
| 2 | Trefl Sopot | 30 | 20 | 10 | 2676 | 2521 | +155 | 50 | Advanced to playoffs |
| 3 | Start Lublin | 30 | 19 | 11 | 2610 | 2548 | +62 | 49 | Advanced to playoffs |
| 4 | Legia Warsaw (C) | 30 | 19 | 11 | 2462 | 2392 | +70 | 49 | Advanced to playoffs |
| 5 | Górnik Wałbrzych | 30 | 18 | 12 | 2379 | 2311 | +68 | 48 | Advanced to playoffs |
| 6 | Czarni Słupsk | 30 | 17 | 13 | 2401 | 2242 | +159 | 47 | Advanced to playoffs |
| 7 | King Wilki Morskie Szczecin | 30 | 17 | 13 | 2605 | 2557 | +48 | 47 | Advanced to playins |
| 8 | Śląsk Wrocław | 30 | 15 | 15 | 2437 | 2412 | +25 | 45 | Advanced to playins |
| 9 | Twarde Pierniki Toruń | 30 | 14 | 16 | 2642 | 2632 | +10 | 44 | Advanced to playins |
| 10 | Dziki Warsaw | 30 | 13 | 17 | 2302 | 2325 | −23 | 43 | Advanced to playins |
| 11 | Zastal Zielona Góra | 30 | 12 | 18 | 2391 | 2497 | −106 | 42 | |
| 12 | GTK Gliwice | 30 | 12 | 18 | 2467 | 2683 | −216 | 42 | |
| 13 | Stal Ostrów Wielkopolski | 30 | 11 | 19 | 2563 | 2610 | −47 | 41 | |
| 14 | MKS Dąbrowa Górnicza | 30 | 11 | 19 | 2472 | 2571 | −99 | 41 | |
| 15 | Arka Gdynia | 30 | 9 | 21 | 2475 | 2701 | −226 | 39 | |
| 16 | Spójnia Stargard (R) | 30 | 9 | 21 | 2278 | 2412 | −134 | 39 | Relegated to I Liga |

Source: PLK
(C) Champions; (R) Relegated

=== Results ===
| Home \ Away | ANW | GDY | STA | CZA | DZI | GTK | SZC | LEG | MKS | TOR | SPO | LUB | SOP | WAL | WRO | ZIE |
|---|---|---|---|---|---|---|---|---|---|---|---|---|---|---|---|---|
| Anwil Włocławek | — | 88–98 | 92–79 | 92–86 | 79–70 | 96–88 | 92–78 | 77–85 | 95–91 | 83–66 | 72–64 | 82–83 | 77–85 | 91–60 | 97–70 | 66–76 |
| Arka Gdynia | 85–97 | — | 79–91 | 88–80 | 69–82 | 83–86 | 83–79 | 56–97 | 81–95 | 97–108 | 84–73 | 102–92 | 89–97 | 74–88 | 81–100 | 83–92 |
| Stal Ostrów Wielkopolski | 85–87 | 105–83 | — | 70–66 | 94–67 | 85–97 | 82–83 | 75–90 | 92–89 | 87–93 | 75–89 | 82–89 | 95–82 | 80–70 | 88–81 | 84–70 |
| Czarni Słupsk | 86–104 | 84–62 | 87–83 | — | 78–64 | 98–84 | 73–74 | 83–60 | 86–72 | 83–89 | 71–79 | 79–56 | 73–77 | 76–62 | 63–72 | 81–54 |
| Dziki Warsaw | 94–101 | 81–80 | 88–63 | 66–81 | — | 90–80 | 70–86 | 70–72 | 86–73 | 86–98 | 71–57 | 75–63 | 71–76 | 68–92 | 71–83 | 83–85 |
| GTK Gliwice | 74–90 | 89–97 | 93–79 | 63–88 | 64–76 | — | 72–87 | 88–85 | 81–79 | 64–111 | 83–97 | 110–105 | 90–86 | 79–95 | 91–73 | 82–70 |
| King Wilki Morskie Szczecin | 89–92 | 99–84 | 100–104 | 68–79 | 105–100 | 97–76 | — | 81–84 | 90–94 | 107–95 | 73–81 | 81–82 | 96–99 | 90–81 | 81–102 | 89–81 |
| Legia Warsaw | 86–94 | 72–88 | 80–79 | 56–70 | 73–66 | 84–87 | 85–71 | — | 68–77 | 82–77 | 88–84 | 76–88 | 70–99 | 81–91 | 88–79 | 85–79 |
| MKS Dąbrowa Górnicza | 77–87 | 100–93 | 98–87 | 91–90 | 48–63 | 107–87 | 88–92 | 79–97 | — | 98–101 | 67–79 | 82–101 | 78–83 | 74–79 | 70–68 | 88–89 |
| Arriva Polski Cukier Toruń | 89–97 | 96–94 | 90–83 | 78–96 | 90–94 | 91–92 | 101–103 | 85–93 | 74–86 | — | 88–89 | 90–96 | 124–121 | 102–85 | 87–72 | 83–79 |
| Spójnia Stargard | 68–83 | 76–83 | 79–73 | 83–96 | 66–84 | 82–87 | 84–74 | 75–81 | 74–79 | 67–79 | — | 73–86 | 69–77 | 81–80 | 69–76 | 80–82 |
| Start Lublin | 83–95 | 96–72 | 105–90 | 83–77 | 86–69 | 91–74 | 77–82 | 78–89 | 95–81 | 79–71 | 85–75 | — | 122–121 | 84–93 | 85–83 | 91–82 |
| Trefl Sopot | 93–108 | 100–72 | 96–81 | 89–65 | 81–70 | 88–77 | 98–100 | 75–109 | 92–68 | 75–68 | 83–78 | 87–88 | — | 100–85 | 94–90 | 88–70 |
| Górnik Wałbrzych | 71–75 | 84–63 | 104–108 | 66–64 | 63–82 | 70–63 | 72–82 | 72–79 | 87–77 | 77–63 | 89–68 | 87–72 | 83–75 | — | 77–60 | 62–56 |
| Śląsk Wrocław | 89–86 | 87–82 | 91–87 | 82–85 | 62–69 | 105–83 | 66–67 | 85–73 | 78–93 | 99–76 | 72–61 | 87–77 | 72–87 | 74–80 | — | 91–82 |
| Zastal Zielona Góra | 70–97 | 87–90 | 92–87 | 75–77 | 77–76 | 98–83 | 80–101 | 84–94 | 86–73 | 68–79 | 91–78 | 101–92 | 83–72 | 70–74 | 82–88 | — |

Source: PLK
Legend: Blue = home team win; Red = away team win.
Matches with lighter background shading were decided after overtime.

== Play-in ==
Under the new format, the 7th to 10th-ranked teams faced each other in the play-in. Each game is hosted by the team with the higher regular season record. The format was similar to the first two rounds of the Page–McIntyre system for a four-team playoff that was identical to that of the NBA play-in tournament. First, the 7th seed will host the 8th seed, with the winner advancing to the playoffs as the 7th seed; likewise the 9th seed will host the 10th seed, with the loser eliminated. Then the loser of the 7-v-8 game will host the winner of the 9-v-10 game, with the winner of that game getting the final playoff spot, as the 8th seed.

Play-in games
7 | King Wilki Morskie Szczecin | 91
8 | WKS Śląsk Wrocław | 74
9 | Twarde Pierniki Toruń | 86
10 | Dziki Warsaw | 82

No. 8 seed game
8 | WKS Śląsk Wrocław | 77
9 | Twarde Pierniki Toruń | 81

Final seeds
King Wilki Morskie Szczecin | No. 7 seed
Twarde Pierniki Toruń | No. 8 seed

== Playoffs ==
Quarterfinals and semifinals are played in a best-of-five format (2–2–1) while the finals in a best-of-seven one (2–2–1–1–1).

=== Bracket ===
Quarterfinals
1 | Anwil Włocławek | 3
8 | Twarde Pierniki Toruń | 1
4 | Legia Warsaw | 3
5 | Górnik Zamek Książ Wałbrzych | 1
2 | Trefl Sopot | 3
7 | King Wilki Morskie Szczecin | 1
3 | PGE Start Lublin | 3
6 | Energa Icon Sea Czarni Słupsk | 2

Semifinals
1 | Anwil Włocławek | 0
4 | Legia Warsaw | 3
2 | Trefl Sopot | 2
3 | PGE Start Lublin | 3

Finals
3 | PGE Start Lublin | 3
4 | Legia Warsaw | 4
Third place
1 | Anwil Włocławek | 161
2 | Trefl Sopot | 167

=== Quarterfinals ===
| Team 1 | Series | Team 2 | Game 1 | Game 2 | Game 3 | Game 4 | Game 5 |
|---|---|---|---|---|---|---|---|
| Anwil Włocławek | 3–1 | Twarde Pierniki Toruń | 86–69 | 107–76 | 82–105 | 98–81 | — |
| Trefl Sopot | 3–1 | King Wilki Morskie Szczecin | 85–84 | 72–66 | 90–91 | 94–68 | — |
| PGE Start Lublin | 3–2 | Energa Icon Sea Czarni Słupsk | 84–82 | 90–81 | 73–92 | 57–89 | 109–94 |
| Legia Warsaw | 3–1 | Górnik Zamek Książ Wałbrzych | 86–55 | 59–62 | 74–64 | 94–85 | — |

=== Semifinals ===
| Team 1 | Series | Team 2 | Game 1 | Game 2 | Game 3 | Game 4 | Game 5 |
|---|---|---|---|---|---|---|---|
| Anwil Włocławek | 0–3 | Legia Warsaw | 76–78 | 85–89 | 80–101 | — | — |
| Trefl Sopot | 2–3 | PGE Start Lublin | 81–100 | 95–79 | 84–92 | 95–93 | 72–79 |

=== Third place series ===
| Team 1 | Agg. | Team 2 | 1st leg | 2nd leg |
|---|---|---|---|---|
| Anwil Włocławek | 161–167 | Trefl Sopot | 88–85 | 73–82 |

=== Finals ===
| Team 1 | Series | Team 2 | Game 1 | Game 2 | Game 3 | Game 4 | Game 5 | Game 6 | Game 7 |
|---|---|---|---|---|---|---|---|---|---|
| PGE Start Lublin | 3–4 | Legia Warsaw | 82–81 | 78–84 | 86–90 | 77–71 | 97–82 | 83–87 | 82–92 |

== Attendance ==
| Pos | Team | Total | High | Low | Average | Change |
|---|---|---|---|---|---|---|
| 1 | Anwil Włocławek | 68,207 | 3,949 | 2,700 | 3,410 | +1.3% |
| 2 | Orlen Zastal Zielona Góra | 48,680 | 4,999 | 2,063 | 3,245 | +40.8% |
| 3 | WKS Śląsk Wrocław | 49,055 | 4,879 | 1,257 | 3,066 | +4.5% |
| 4 | Tasomix Rosiek Stal Ostrów Wielkopolski | 43,833 | 3,086 | 2,478 | 2,922 | −0.3% |
| 5 | Trefl Sopot | 48,612 | 4,657 | 1,327 | 2,315 | −23.3% |
| 6 | Górnik Zamek Książ Wałbrzych | 34,646 | 2,138 | 1,893 | 2,038 | +69.1%^{1} |
| 7 | King Szczecin | 36,600 | 3,602 | 880 | 2,033 | −26.2% |
| 8 | Energa Icon Sea Czarni Słupsk | 33,766 | 2,000 | 1,922 | 1,986 | +1.0% |
| 9 | PGE Start Lublin | 46,512 | 4,221 | 732 | 1,938 | +61.1% |
| 10 | Legia Warsaw | 37,010 | 1,991 | 1,350 | 1,762 | +3.6% |
| 11 | Arriva Polski Cukier Toruń | 31,577 | 4,000 | 1,088 | 1,754 | +28.5% |
| 12 | AMW Arka Gdynia | 25,691 | 3,022 | 1,141 | 1,713 | +12.5% |
| 13 | Spójnia Stargard | 18,511 | 1,497 | 893 | 1,234 | −4.2% |
| 14 | Dziki Warsaw | 14,932 | 1,190 | 815 | 995 | −6.3% |
| 15 | Tauron GTK Gliwice | 13,291 | 1,092 | 625 | 886 | +14.9% |
| 16 | MKS Dąbrowa Górnicza | 12,490 | 1,000 | 569 | 833 | −34.9% |
| | League total | 563,413 | 4,999 | 569 | 2,034 | +2.0% |

Source: PKL.pl
Notes:
1: Team play in I Liga in previous season.

== Awards ==
All official awards of the 2024–25 PLK season.

=== Season awards ===
| Award | Player | Team | Ref. |
|---|---|---|---|
| PLK Most Valuable Player | (United States) Kameron McGusty | Legia Warsaw | |
| PLK Finals MVP | (United States) Kameron McGusty | Legia Warsaw | |
| PLK Best Defender | (Canada) Aaron Best | Trefl Sopot | |
| PLK Best Polish Player | (Poland) Michał Michalak | Anwil Włocławek | |
| PLK Best Coach | (Turkey) Selçuk Ernak | Anwil Włocławek | |
| All-PLK Team | (Serbia) Jovan Novak | Wilki Morskie Szczecin | |
| All-PLK Team | (United States) Alex Stein | Icon Sea Czarni Słupsk | |
| All-PLK Team | (United States) Kameron McGusty | Legia Warsaw | |
| All-PLK Team | (Poland) Michał Michalak | Anwil Włocławek | |
| All-PLK Team | (United States) D. J. Funderburk | Anwil Włocławek | |

=== MVP of the Month ===
| Month | Player | Team | EFF | Ref. |
2024
| October | (Poland) Jarosław Zyskowski | Trefl Sopot | 16.3 | |
| November | (Poland) Michał Michalak | Anwil Włocławek | 16.8 | |
| December | (United States) Courtney Ramey | Start Lublin | 20.2 | |
2025
| January | (United States) Ike Smith | Górnik Zamek Książ Wałbrzych | 15.2 | |
| February | (United States) Ike Smith | Górnik Zamek Książ Wałbrzych | 15.2 | |
| March | (United States) Alex Stein | Icon Sea Czarni Słupsk | 20.0 | |

=== MVP of the Round ===
| Gameday | Player | Team | EFF | Ref. |
|---|---|---|---|---|
| 1 | (Poland) Łukasz Frąckiewicz | Tauron GTK Gliwice | 28 | |
| 2 | (United States) Alterique Gilbert | Górnik Zamek Książ Wałbrzych | 16 | |
| 3 | (Serbia) Stefan Đorđević | AMW Arka Gdynia | 33 | |
| 4 | (Slovakia) Mario Ihring | Tauron GTK Gliwice | 29 | |
| 5 | (United States) Souley Boum | MKS Dąbrowa Górnicza | 32 | |
| 6 | (Poland) Michał Michalak | Anwil Włocławek | 23 | |
| 7 | (Jamaica) Tyran De Lattibeaudiere | Start Lublin | 34 | |
| 8 | (Poland) Kamil Łączyński | Anwil Włocławek | 29 | |
| 9 | (United States) Courtney Ramey | Start Lublin | 29 | |
| 10 | (United States) Kameron McGusty | Legia Warsaw | 36 | |
| 11 | (Serbia) Nemanja Nenadić | AMW Arka Gdynia | 28 | |
| 12 | (United States) Michael Ertel | Arriva Polski Cukier Toruń | 37 | |
| 13 | (Sweden) Viktor Gaddefors | Arriva Polski Cukier Toruń | 38 | |
| 14 | (United States Virgin Islands) Walter Hodge | Zastal Zielona Góra | 27 | |
| 15 | (Poland) Dariusz Wyka | Górnik Zamek Książ Wałbrzych | 23 | |
| 16 | (United States) Loren Jackson | Icon Sea Czarni Słupsk | 23 | |
| 17 | (United States) Nick Johnson | Trefl Sopot | 39 | |
| 18 | (United States) Tyler Cheese | MKS Dąbrowa Górnicza | 29 | |
| 19 | (Poland) Dariusz Wyka (x2) | Górnik Zamek Książ Wałbrzych | 36 | |
| 20 | (United States) Isaiah Whitehead | King Szczecin | 32 | |
| 21 | (Poland) Jakub Schenk | Trefl Sopot | 31 | |
| 22 | (Serbia) Jovan Novak | King Szczecin | 33 | |
| 23 | (United States) Michael Ertel (x2) | Arriva Polski Cukier Toruń | 30 | |
| 24 | (Serbia) Jovan Novak (x2) | King Szczecin | 31 | |
| 25 | (Canada) Aaron Best | Trefl Sopot | 25 | |
| 26 | (United States) Kameron McGusty (x2) | Legia Warsaw | 27 | |
| 27 | (Slovakia) Mario Ihring (x2) | Tauron GTK Gliwice | 20 | |
| 28 | (United States) Alex Stein | Icon Sea Czarni Słupsk | 20 & 26 | |
| 29 | (Poland) Andrzej Pluta Jr. | Legia Warsaw | 23 | |

== Statistical leaders ==
Leaders at the end of the regular season.

| Category | Player | Team | Value |
|---|---|---|---|
| Points per game | (United States) Kameron McGusty | Legia Warsaw | 19.9 |
| Rebounds per game | (Serbia) Stefan Đorđević | Arka Gdynia | 8.9 |
| Assists per game | (Serbia) Jovan Novak | King Szczecin | 9.6 |
| Steals per game | (United States) Sindarius Thornwell | Zastal Zielona Góra | 2.1 |
| Blocks per game | (United States) Wesley Gordon | Spójnia Stargard | 1.4 |
| Evaluation per game | (Serbia) Stefan Đorđević | Arka Gdynia | 24.2 |

== Polish clubs in European competitions ==
| Team | Competition | Progress |
|---|---|---|
| Trefl Sopot | EuroCup | Regular Season |
| King Szczecin | Champions League | Regular Season |
| Śląsk Wrocław | Champions League | Regular Season |
| Anwil Włocławek | FIBA Europe Cup | Second Round |
| Spójnia Stargard | FIBA Europe Cup | Regular season |

== Polish clubs in Regional competitions ==
| Team | Competition | Progress |
|---|---|---|
| Dziki Warsaw | European North Basketball League | Final Four |
| Legia Warsaw | European North Basketball League | Quarterfinals |
