= Adam Kemp =

American basketball player

Free Agent
- Position: Power forward

Personal information
- Born: December 20, 1990 (age 35) Sherrill, New York
- Listed height: 6 ft 10 in (2.08 m)
- Listed weight: 235 lb (107 kg)

Career information
- High school: Vernon-Verona-Sherrill High School (Verona, New York); The Winchendon School (Winchendon, Massachusetts)
- College: Marist Red Foxes (2010–2014)
- NBA draft: 2014: undrafted
- Playing career: 2014–present

Career history
- 2014–2015: KK Feni Industries
- 2015–2016: BC Astana
- 2016–2017: Spirou Charleroi
- 2017: BC Beroe
- 2018: Koroivos
- 2018–2019: Polpharma Starogard Gdański
- 2019–2020: Astoria Bydgoszcz
- 2020–2021: Start Lublin
- 2021–2022: Legia Warszawa
- 2022: Alba Fehérvár
- 2022–2024: Sokół Łańcut
- 2025–2026: Astoria Bydgoszcz

Career highlights
- Third-team All-MAAC (2013)

Adam Kemp (born December 20, 1990) is an American professional basketball player who last played for Astoria Bydgoszcz of the Polish Second Division. In 2014, Kemp graduated from Marist College with a degree in Sports Communication, and a minor in Psychology.

He joined the Detroit Pistons for the 2015 Orlando Summer League.

== Professional career ==
On June 12, 2016, Kemp signed with Spirou Charleroi of the Belgian Basketball League.

On August 7, 2017, Kemp signed with BC Beroe of the Bulgarian NBL.

On September 7, 2018, Kemp signed with SKS Starogard Gdański of the Polish Basketball League (PLK).

On June 18, 2019, Kemp signed with Astoria Bydgoszcz of the Polish Basketball League (PLK). He averaged 10.6 points, 7.1 rebounds and 1.6 blocks per game. On August 20, 2020, Kemp signed with Start Lublin.

On June 5, 2021, he has signed with Legia Warszawa of the Polish Basketball League.

On November 11, 2022, he signed with Sokół Łańcut of the Polish Basketball League (PLK).
