= PLK Best Polish Player =

The PLK Best Polish Player award is an annual award in the Polish Basketball League that is given to the best player with a Polish nationality. Players, coaches and press members vote for the winner of the award.

== Winners ==
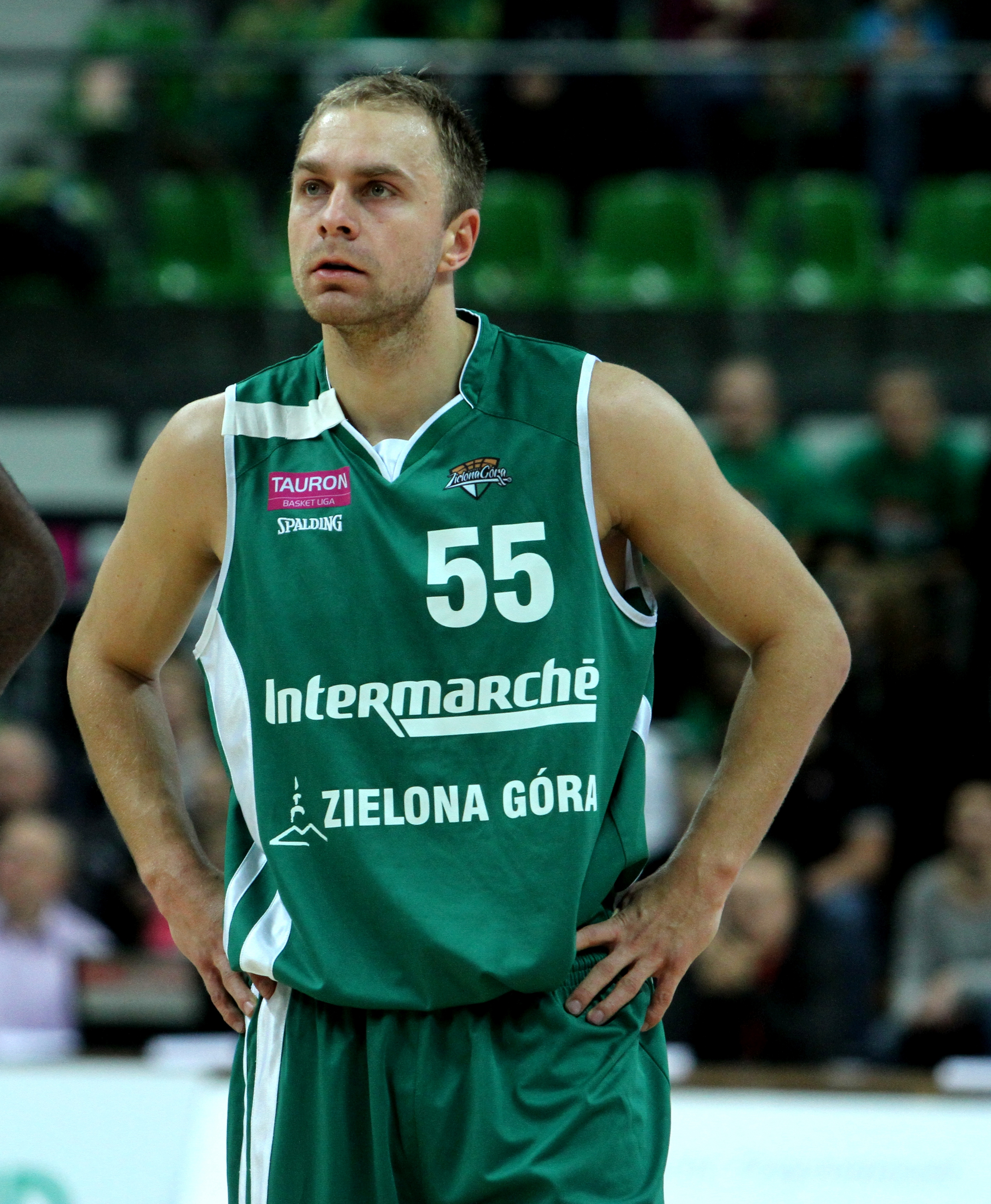
Łukasz Koszarek won the award three times

Season	Player	Club	Ref.
2009–10	Krzysztof Szubarga	Anwil Włocławek	
2010–11	Filip Dylewicz	Trefl Sopot	
2011–12	Łukasz Koszarek	Trefl Sopot	
2012–13	Łukasz Koszarek (x2)	Stelmet Zielona Góra	
2013–14	Łukasz Koszarek (x3)	Stelmet Zielona Góra	
2014–15	Damian Kulig	PGE Turów Zgorzelec	
2015–16	Mateusz Ponitka	Stelmet Zielona Góra	
2016–17	Krzysztof Szubarga (x2)	Asseco Gdynia	
2017–18	Michał Sokołowski	Rosa Radom	
2018–19	Michał Sokołowski (x2)	Stelmet Enea Zielona Góra	
2019–20	Not awarded		
2020–21	Jakub Garbacz	BM Slam Stal Ostrów Wielkopolski	
2021–22	Aleksander Dziewa	Śląsk Wrocław	
2022–23	Andrzej Mazurczak	Wilki Morskie Szczecin	
2023–24	Andrzej Mazurczak (x2)	Wilki Morskie Szczecin	
2024–25	Michał Michalak	Anwil Włocławek	
2025–26	Andrzej Pluta Jr.	Legia Warsaw	
