= All-PLK Team =

The All-PLK Team is an annual honour for the five best players of a given Polish Basketball League (PLK) regular season. The team is voted by press reporters from around the country.

== Teams ==
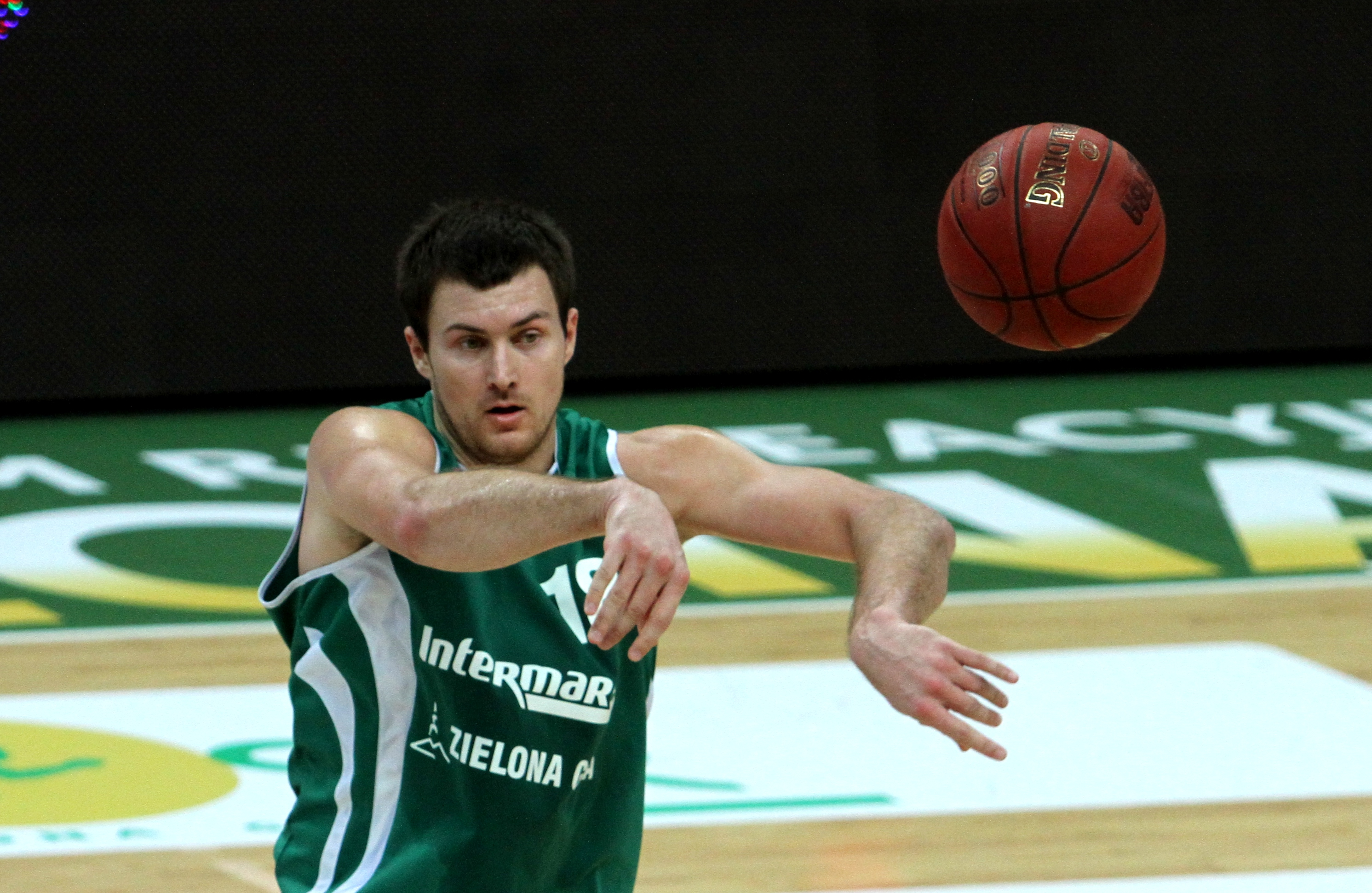
Montenegrin Vladimir Dragičević was named to the team three times

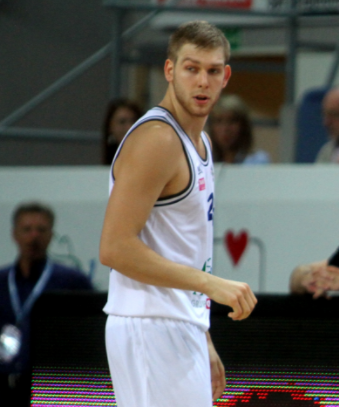
Michał Sokołowski was named to the team in 2017 and 2018

The player in bold was named the PLK Most Valuable Player of the given season.

Season	Pos	Player	Team	Ref.
2014–15	G	(United States) Jerel Blassingame	Czarni Słupsk	
2014–15	F	(United States) Mardy Collins	PGE Turów Zgorzelec	
2014–15	G	(Poland) Karol Gruszecki	Czarni Słupsk	
2014–15	F	(Poland) **Damian Kulig**	PGE Turów Zgorzelec	
2014–15	F	(Georgia (country)) Quinton Hosley	Stelmet Zielona Góra	
2015–16	G	(United States) Danny Gibson	Polski Cukier Toruń	
2015–16	G	(Czech Republic) David Jelinek	Anwil Włocławek	
2015–16	F	(Poland) **Mateusz Ponitka**	Stelmet Zielona Góra	
2015–16	F	(Ukraine) Maksym Korniyenko	Polski Cukier Toruń	
2015–16	C	(Serbia) Dejan Borovnjak	Stelmet Zielona Góra	
2016–17	G	(Poland) Krzysztof Szubarga	Asseco Gdynia	
2016–17	G	(Serbia) Nemanja Jaramaz	Anwil Włocławek	
2016–17	F	(Poland) Michał Sokołowski	Rosa Radom	
2016–17	F	(Montenegro) Vladimir Dragičević	Stelmet Zielona Góra	
2016–17	C	(Saint Vincent and the Grenadines) **Shawn King**	Stal Ostrów Wielkopolski	
2017–18	G	(Poland) Aaron Cel (2)	Polski Cukier Toruń	
2017–18	F	(Cape Verde) **Ivan Almeida**	Anwil Włocławek	
2017–18	F	(Poland) Michał Sokołowski (2)	Rosa Radom	
2017–18	F	(Montenegro) Vladimir Dragičević (3)	Stelmet Zielona Góra	
2017–18	C	(United States) Aaron Johnson	Stal Ostrów Wielkopolski	
2018–19	G	(United States) **James Florence**	Asseco Arka Gdynia	
2018–19	F	(United States) Josh Bostic	Asseco Arka Gdynia	
2018–19	F	(Poland) Michał Sokołowski (3)	Stelmet Enea BC Zielona Góra	
2018–19	F	(Montenegro) Vladimir Dragičević (4)	MKS Dąbrowa Górnicza	
2018–19	C	(Poland) Aaron Cel (3)	Polski Cukier Toruń	
2019–20	Not awarded			
2020–21	PG	(Denmark) Gabriel Lundberg	Zastal Zielona Góra	
2020–21	SG	(United States) Lee Moore	MKS Dąbrowa Górnicza	
2020–21	SF	(Poland) Jakub Garbacz	BM Slam Stal Ostrów Wielkopolski	
2020–21	PF	(Latvia) Rolands Freimanis	Zastal Zielona Góra	
2020–21	C	(United States) **Geoffrey Groselle**	Zastal Zielona Góra	
2021–22	PG	(United States) **Travis Trice**	WKS Śląsk Wrocław	
2021–22	SG	(United States) Jonah Mathews	Anwil Włocławek	
2021–22	SG	(United States) Billy Garrett Jr.	Grupa Sierleccy Czarni Słupsk	
2021–22	PF	(Poland) Aleksander Dziewa	WKS Śląsk Wrocław	
2021–22	C	(Serbia) Dragan Apić	Zastal Zielona Góra	
2022–23	PG	(Poland) **Andrzej Mazurczak**	Wilki Morskie Szczecin	
2022–23	PG	(United States) Jeremiah Martin	WKS Śląsk Wrocław	
2022–23	SG	(Poland) Przemyslaw Zolnierewicz	Enea Zastal BC Zielona Góra	
2022–23	PF	(Poland) Aleksander Dziewa	WKS Śląsk Wrocław	
2022–23	PF	(Poland) Damian Kulig	BM Stal Ostrów Wielkopolski	
2023–24	PG	(Poland) Andrzej Mazurczak	Wilki Morskie Szczecin	
2023–24	G	(Latvia) Aigars Šķēle	BM Stal Ostrów Wielkopolski	
2023–24	PG	(United States) Christian Vital	Legia Warszawa	
2023–24	SG	(United States) **Victor Sanders**	Anwil Włocławek	
2023–24	C	(United States) Aric Holman	Legia Warszawa	
2024–25	PG	(Serbia) Jovan Novak	Wilki Morskie Szczecin	
2024–25	G	(United States) Alex Stein	Icon Sea Czarni Słupsk	
2024–25	SG	(United States) **Kameron McGusty**	Legia Warszawa	
2024–25	SG	(Poland) Michał Michalak	Anwil Włocławek	
2024–25	F/C	(United States) D. J. Funderburk	Anwil Włocławek	
2025–26	PG	(Poland) **Andrzej Pluta Jr.**	Legia Warsaw	
2025–26	F	(United States) Landrius Horton	Dziki Warsaw	
2025–26	SG	(Canada) Noah Kirkwood	WKS Śląsk Wrocław	
2025–26	PF	(Poland) Jakub Szumert	Orlen Zastal Zielona Góra	
2025–26	PF	(Serbia) Nemanja Popović	Wilki Morskie Szczecin	
