= R8 Basket Kraków =

- Founded: 2016
- Dissolved: 2018
- History: R8 Basket Kraków (2016–2018)
- Arena: Tauron Arena Kraków
- Capacity: 800
- Location: Kraków, Poland
- Ownership: Dominika Kotarby-Majkutewicza
Home	Away

R8 Basket Kraków was a Polish professional basketball club based in Kraków. Established in 2016, the team played two seasons in the I Liga, the second division of basketball in Poland. Its owner was Dominika Kotarby-Majkutewicza. In 2018, R8 Basket was dissolved just two years after its foundation.

== History ==
The club started in 2015 with the licence of AZS Politechniki Kraków. In 2016, the club was transformed to R8 Basket. Game were played in a hall of the Tauron Arena, which has a capacity of 800 people. In the 2016–17 season, Kraków won the third division 2 Liga and was promoted to the national second division.

In the 2017–18 season, R8 Basket was eliminated in the quarter-finals by GKS Tychy after finishing fourth in the I Liga regular season. On 1 June 2018, the club announced it was to be dissolved. The disestablishment was no surprise as before the season it was announced that if the team would not promote it would be dissolved. Head coach Marcin Kękuś stated that "there is no climate for high level basketball in Krakow".

== Honours ==
- II Liga

Champions (1): 2016–17

- PZKosz Cup

Champions (1): 2016–17

== Season by season ==
Season	Tier	League	Pos	Other leagues	
2016–17	3	II Liga	1st	PZKosz Cup	C
2017–18	2	I Liga	5th		

== Head coaches ==
- (Poland) Marcin Kękuś (2016–2018)
