= Jeremiah Martin =

American basketball player (born 1996)

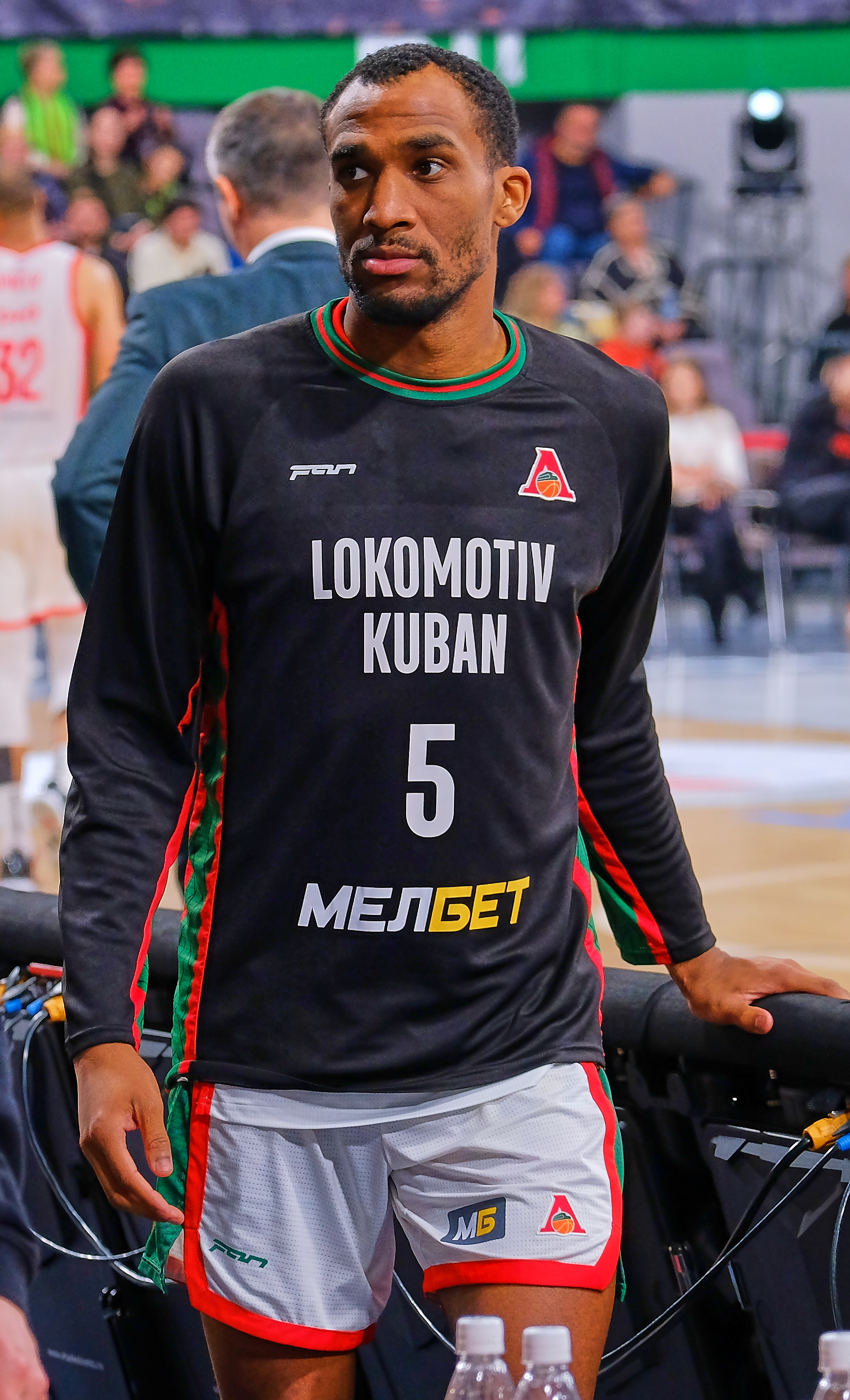
- Martin with the Lokomotiv Kuban in 2025

Free agent
- Position: Point guard

Personal information
- Born: June 19, 1996 (age 30) Memphis, Tennessee, U.S.
- Listed height: 6 ft 2 in (1.88 m)
- Listed weight: 185 lb (84 kg)

Career information
- High school: Mitchell (Memphis, Tennessee)
- College: Memphis (2015–2019)
- NBA draft: 2019: undrafted
- Playing career: 2019–present

Career history
- 2019–2020: Sioux Falls Skyforce
- 2020: Brooklyn Nets
- 2020: →Long Island Nets
- 2021: Long Island Nets
- 2021: Cleveland Cavaliers
- 2021–2022: New Zealand Breakers
- 2022: BG Göttingen
- 2022–2023: Śląsk Wrocław
- 2023–2024: Enisey
- 2024–2025: Uralmash
- 2025–2026: Lokomotiv Kuban

Career highlights
- EuroCup steals leader (2023); VTB United League Top Scorer (2025); PLK Top Scorer (2023); All-PLK Team (2023); First-team All-AAC (2019); Second-team All-AAC (2018); Tennessee Mr. Basketball (2015)
- Stats at NBA.com
- Stats at Basketball Reference

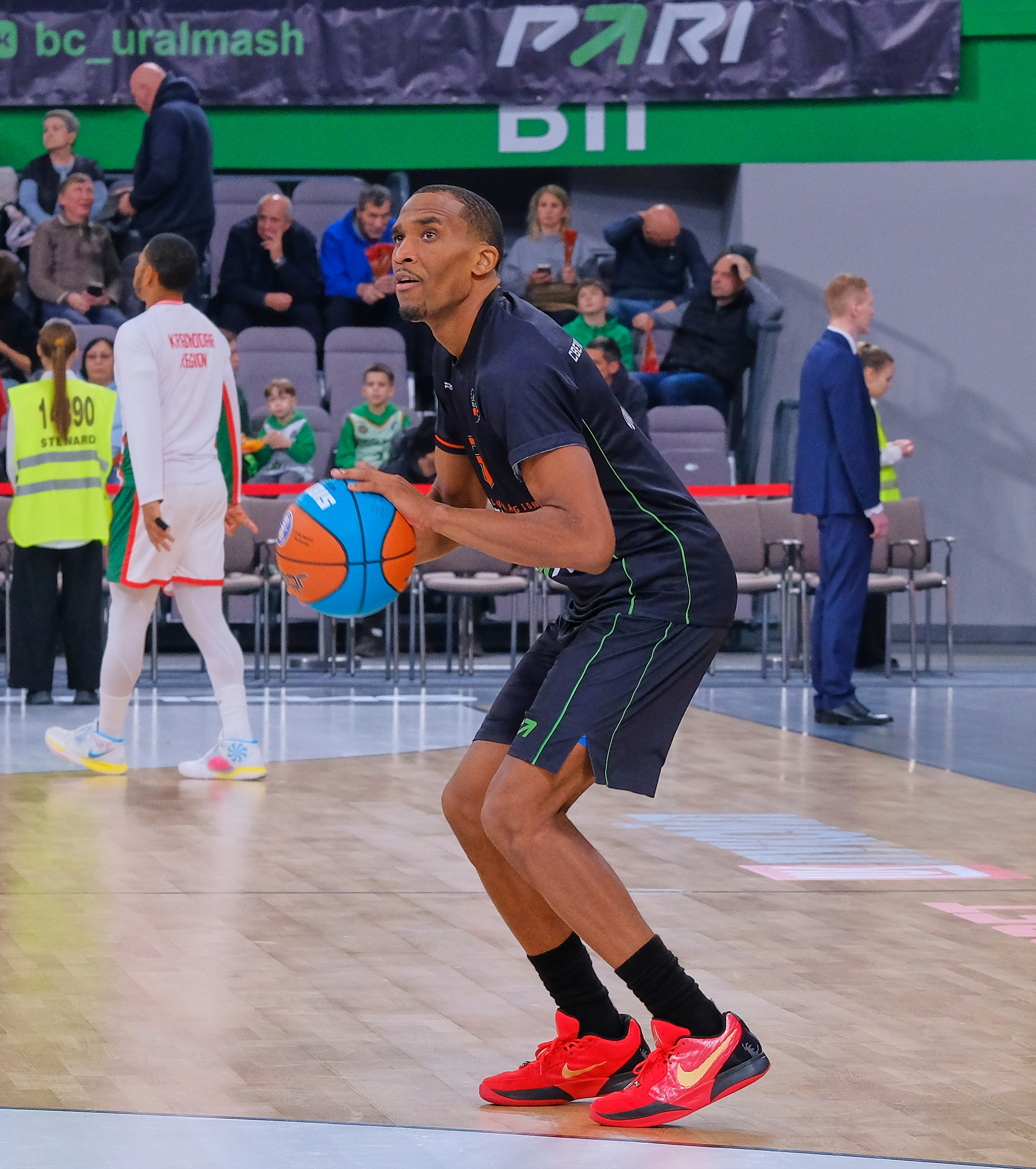
Martin with the Uralmash in 2024

Jeremiah Oljawain Martin Jr. (born June 19, 1996) is an American professional basketball player who last played for Lokomotiv Kuban of the VTB United League. He played college basketball for the Memphis Tigers.

== Early life ==
Martin grew up in Memphis, Tennessee and Mitchell High School. He was a three year starter for the school's basketball team and Mitchell won the TSSAA Class A state season in his junior and senior seasons. As a senior, Martin was named Tennessee Mr. Basketball and the MVP of the TSSAA State Tournament after scoring 19 points in the state title game. Martin initially committed to playing college basketball for Louisiana Tech, but de-committed in favor of playing for Memphis.

== College career ==
Martin played four seasons for the Memphis Tigers. He appeared in 29 games as a freshman, starting five, and averaged 2.7 points and 1.2 assists per game. He became the team's starting point guard as a sophomore, averaging 10.3 points per game and leading the Tigers with 4.4 assists and 1.8 steals per game. As a junior, Martin averaged 18.9 points, 4.3 rebounds, 3.8 assists and an American Athletic Conference (AAC)-leading 2.3 steals per game and was named second team All-AAC, despite missing seven games due to a foot injury. In his senior season, Martin started all 36 of Memphis's games and was named first team All-AAC after averaging 19.7 points, 4.4 assists, 4.3 rebounds, and 2.19 steals per game. Martin led the team in points with 708 (the second most by a senior in Memphis history), as well as field goals (220), free throws made (202), assists (157), steals (79) and minutes played (1,236). He became the first player in school history with multiple 40-point games after scoring 41 points (all in the second half) against South Florida on February 2, 2019 and a career-high 43 against Tulane on February 20, 2019. He finished his collegiate career 10th in school history with 1,625 points scored and 436 assists. After his senior season Martin participated in the Portsmouth Invitational Tournament and was named to the All-Tournament team after averaging 15 points, 5.6 assists and 5.3 rebounds per game in three games.

== Professional career ==
=== Sioux Falls Skyforce (2019–2020) ===
Martin worked out for several teams leading up to the 2019 NBA draft, but ultimately went unselected. He was named to the Miami Heat's Summer League roster and averaged 7.7 points and 2.3 assists in seven games. Martin signed an Exhibit 10 contract with the Miami Heat on July 12, 2019. On October 15, 2019, Martin was waived by the Heat. Following training camp, Martin was added to the roster of the Heat's NBA G League affiliate, the Sioux Falls Skyforce. On November 30, he tallied 31 points, four rebounds, two assists and one steal in a win over the Northern Arizona Suns.

=== Brooklyn Nets (2020) ===
On January 15, 2020, Martin was signed by the Brooklyn Nets to a two-way contract. On January 22, Martin contributed 24 points, five rebounds, four assists, four steals and a block in a win over the South Bay Lakers. Martin made his NBA debut on January 31 against the Chicago Bulls, playing two minutes and grabbing a rebound in a 133–118 win. Martin scored his first career points on February 5, scoring two points on one for three shooting with one assist and one steal in the final nine minutes of a 129–88 win over the Golden State Warriors. On August 11, he scored a career high 24 points in a 108–96 win over the Orlando Magic. Martin was waived just prior to the start of the 2020–21 season.

=== Long Island Nets (2021) ===
On January 27, 2021, Martin re-signed with the Long Island Nets where he appeared in 15 games, all starts and averaged 18.5 points, 3.7 rebounds, 5.1 assists and 2.4 steals in 31.8 minutes.

=== Cleveland Cavaliers (2021) ===
On April 28, 2021, Martin signed a two-way contract with the Cleveland Cavaliers.

And the next off-season, Martin joined the New York Knicks and the Atlanta Hawks for the 2021 NBA summer league.

=== New Zealand Breakers (2021–2022) ===
On October 3, 2021, Martin signed with the New Zealand Breakers for the 2021–22 NBL season. On February 10, 2022, he parted ways with the Breakers. Martin averaged 12.3 points, 2.8 rebounds and 3.5 assists over ten games with the Breakers.

=== Śląsk Wrocław (2022–2023) ===
On August 13, 2022, he has signed with Śląsk Wrocław of the PLK.

=== Enisey Krasnoyarsk ===
He has signed with Enisey Krasnoarsk in the VTB United League.

== Career statistics ==
Legend
GP	Games played	GS	Games started	MPG	Minutes per game
FG%	Field goal percentage	3P%	3-point field goal percentage	FT%	Free throw percentage
RPG	Rebounds per game	APG	Assists per game	SPG	Steals per game
BPG	Blocks per game	PPG	Points per game	**Bold**	Career high

=== NBA ===
==== Regular season ====
Year	Team	GP	GS	MPG	FG%	3P%	FT%	RPG	APG	SPG	BPG	PPG
2019–20	Brooklyn	**9**	0	**11.0**	**.453**	**.278**	**.786**	**1.1**	**2.0**	**.8**	**.2**	**7.1**
2020–21	Cleveland	**9**	0	8.3	.273	.250	.200	.8	.4	.6	**.2**	2.4
Career		18	0	9.7	.384	.267	.632	.9	1.2	.7	.2	4.8

==== Playoffs ====
Year	Team	GP	GS	MPG	FG%	3P%	FT%	RPG	APG	SPG	BPG	PPG
2020	Brooklyn	3	0	9.0	.286	.600	1.000	1.0	1.3	.0	.3	4.0
Career		3	0	9.0	.286	.600	1.000	1.0	1.3	.0	.3	4.0

=== College ===
Year	Team	GP	GS	MPG	FG%	3P%	FT%	RPG	APG	SPG	BPG	PPG
2015–16	Memphis	29	5	13.8	.333	.300	.636	1.1	1.2	.8	.2	2.7
2016–17	Memphis	32	32	**34.8**	**.451**	.282	.673	3.1	**4.4**	1.8	**.7**	10.3
2017–18	Memphis	27	26	34.7	.444	.327	**.784**	**4.3**	3.8	**2.3**	.6	18.9
2018–19	Memphis	**36**	**36**	34.2	**.451**	**.346**	.762	**4.3**	**4.4**	2.2	.6	**19.7**
Career		124	134	29.7	.441	.325	.745	3.2	3.5	1.8	.6	13.1
