= GTK Gliwice =

Polish basketball team

Euvic GTK Gliwice
- Leagues: PLK
- Founded: 1998; 28 years ago
- Arena: Gliwice Arena
- Capacity: 13,752
- Location: Gliwice, Poland
- Team colors: Navy, White, Orange
- President: Łukasz Kopera
- Head coach: Nebojša Vidić
- Team captain: Kacper Gordon
- Website: www.gtk.gliwice.pl
Home	Away

Gliwickie Towarzystwo Koszykówki Gliwice, shortly GTK Gliwice, is a professional basketball club based in Gliwice, Poland. The team currently (as of 2022–23) plays in the Polish Basketball League, the country's top division.

== History ==
The club was founded in 1998 and initially focussed on youth teams and developing young players. In 2006, the club reached the III Liga, the fourth highest level in Polish basketball. In 2010, the team promoted to the II Liga and in 2014 the club was invited to join the I Liga. After the club finished as the runner-up in the 2016–17 season, Gliwice was invited to join the PLK for the 2017–18 season.

Since 2018, Gliwice plays in the Gliwice Arena, changing between its big hall and training hall.

On 26 May 2020, Gliwice signed German Matthias Zollner as new head coach.

== Players ==
=== Current roster ===
Note: Flags indicate national team eligibility at FIBA-sanctioned events. Players may hold other non-FIBA nationalities not displayed.

Euvic GTK Gliwice roster
Players
Coaches

Pos.	No.	Nat.	Name	Ht.	Age
PG	0	(Poland)	Leniec, Maksymilian	1.94 m (6 ft 4 in)	19 – 25 September 2007
SG	1	(Angola)	Miguel, Selton	1.93 m (6 ft 4 in)	26 – 24 October 2000
G	2	(United States)	Nottage, Eric	1.88 m (6 ft 2 in)	31 – 10 December 1994
G/F	3	(United States)	Schwieger, Ben	2.03 m (6 ft 8 in)	23 – 18 June 2003
G	4	(Poland)	Walczuk, Marcel	1.96 m (6 ft 5 in)	18 – 7 June 2008
F	5	(United States)	Gray, Justin	1.98 m (6 ft 6 in)	30 – 15 December 1995
PG	7	(Poland)	Gordon, Kacper (C)	1.84 m (6 ft 0 in)	24 – 6 May 2002
SG	9	(Poland)	Wilczek, Dominik	1.93 m (6 ft 4 in)	27 – 16 July 1999
C	10	(Montenegro)	Šuškavčević, Milan	2.08 m (6 ft 10 in)	28 – 19 November 1997
G	11	(Poland)	Łosiak, Piotr	1.87 m (6 ft 2 in)	18 – 5 March 2008
PF	24	(United States)	Smith, Anthony	2.01 m (6 ft 7 in)	29 – 16 March 1997
C	66	(Poland)	Misztal, Kajetan	2.06 m (6 ft 9 in)	19 – 20 July 2007
F		(Poland)	Heliński, Stanisław	1.98 m (6 ft 6 in)	26 – 27 October 2000

Head coach

- (Serbia) Nebojša Vidić

Assistant coach(es)

- (Serbia) Petar Zlatanović
- (Poland) Radosław Ciosek

Legend

- (C) Team captain
- Injured

- Roster
Updated: November 11, 2026

=== Notable players ===
- (United States) Quinton Hooker
- (United States) Terrance Ferguson
- (United States) Malachi Richardson

== Season by season ==
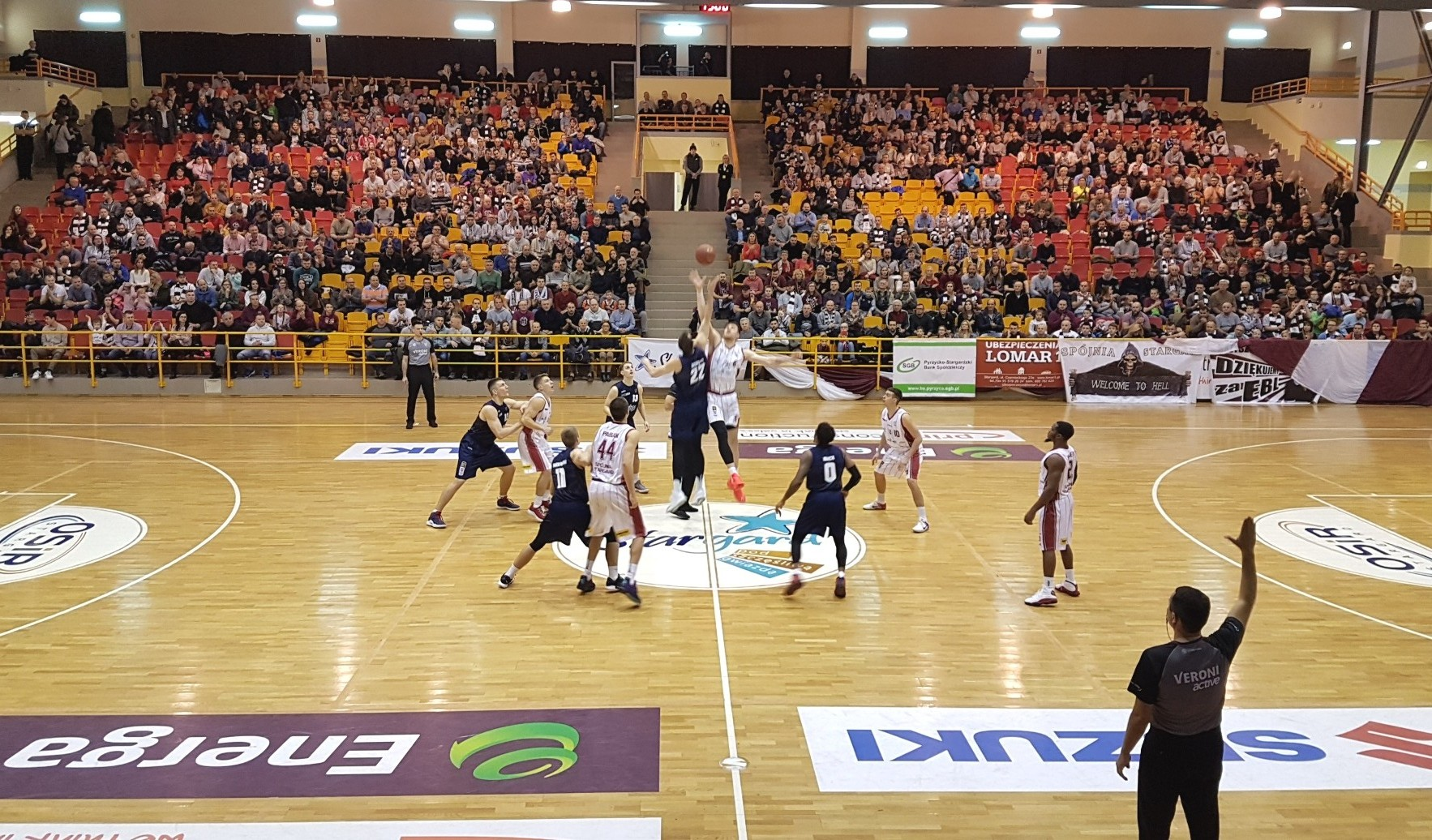
Away game with Spójnia Stargard in the 2018–19 PLK season

Season	Tier	League	Pos	Polish Cup
2012–13	3	II Liga	4th	
2013–14	3	II Liga	2nd	
2014–15	2	I Liga	10th	
2015–16	2	I Liga	15th	
2016–17	2	I Liga	2nd (Note: Received a wild card to promote to the PLK.)	
2017–18	1	PLK	14th	
2018–19	1	PLK	12th	
2019–20	1	PLK	13th	
2020–21	1	PLK	12th	
2021–22	1	PLK	15th	
2022–23	1	PLK	14th	
2023–24	1	PLK	14th	
2024–25	1	PLK	12th	
2025–26	1	PLK	15th	

== Crest ==
Logo used from 2010 until 2017

The club's crest depicts the Gliwice Radio Tower, one of the most distinctive historic landmarks of Gliwice. The previous logo, used from 2010 to 2017, depicted another prominent heritage sight of Gliwice, its historic City Hall.
