= 2019–20 PLK season =

Energa Basket Liga
- Season: 2019–20

Finals
- Champions: Stelmet Enea Zielona Góra (5th title)
- Runners-up: Start Lublin
- Third place: Anwil Włocławek

The 2019–20 Polish Basketball League (PLK) season, the Energa Basket Liga for sponsorship reasons, was the 86th season of the Polish Basketball League, the highest professional basketball league in Poland. Anwil Włocławek were the defending champions.

On 17 March 2020, the league was ended prematurely due to the coronavirus pandemic. Stelmet Enea Zielona Góra were named champions.

== Teams ==
16 teams will participate this season. Enea Astoria Bydgoszcz and Śląsk Wrocław were promoted from the I Liga, while Miasto Szkla Krosno was relegated. Koszalin did not get a licence this season.

=== Locations and venues ===
Location of teams in the 2019–20 PLK season

Team	Location	Arena	Capacity
Anwil Włocławek	Włocławek	Hala Mistrzów	4,200
Asseco Arka Gdynia	Gdynia	Gdynia Sports Arena	5,500
BM Slam Stal Ostrów Wielkopolski	Ostrów Wielkopolski	Hala Sportowa Stal	1,200
Enea Astoria	Bydgoszcz	Artego Arena	1,470
GTK Gliwice	Gliwice	Gliwice Arena	13,752
GTK Gliwice	Gliwice	Mała Arena	1,092
HydroTruck Radom	Radom	ZSE Radom	1,200
Legia Warsaw	Warsaw	OSiR Bemowo	1,000
MKS Dąbrowa Górnicza	Dąbrowa Górnicza	Centrum Hall	2,944
Polpharma Starogard Gdański	Starogard Gdański	Argo-Kociewie	2,500
Polski Cukier Toruń	Toruń	Arena Toruń	6,248
Śląsk Wrocław	Wrocław	Hala Orbita	3,000
Stelmet Enea Zielona Góra	Zielona Góra	CRS Hall	6,080
Spójnia Stargard	Stargard	Hala Miejska	2,500
TBV Start Lublin	Lublin	Hala Globus	5,000
Trefl Sopot	Sopot	Ergo Arena	15,000
Wilki Morskie Szczecin	Szczecin	Azoty Arena	7,403

== Regular season ==
=== League table ===
Pos	Team	Pld	W	L	PF	PA	PD	Pts	Qualification or relegation
1	Stelmet Enea Zielona Góra (C)	22	19	3	2097	1806	+291	41	
2	Start Lublin	22	17	5	1867	1716	+151	39	Qualification for Champions League
3	Anwil Włocławek	22	17	5	2078	1837	+241	39	Qualification for Champions League qualifying rounds
4	Asseco Arka Gdynia	22	14	8	1765	1655	+110	36	
5	Polski Cukier Toruń	20	15	5	1755	1583	+172	35	
6	Trefl Sopot	22	12	10	1786	1792	−6	34	
7	WKS Śląsk Wrocław	22	11	11	1910	1861	+49	33	
8	King Szczecin	22	11	11	1834	1848	−14	33	
9	BM Slam Stal Ostrów Wielkopolski	22	10	12	1772	1746	+26	32	Qualification for FIBA Europe Cup
10	Spójnia Stargard	22	10	12	1724	1772	−48	32	
11	Enea Astoria Bydgoszcz	21	10	11	1839	1847	−8	31	
12	HydroTruck Radom	22	9	13	1711	1790	−79	31	
13	GTK Gliwice	22	7	15	1857	1973	−116	29	
14	Legia Warszawa	22	5	17	1773	1976	−203	27	
15	MKS Dąbrowa Górnicza	23	4	19	1808	2135	−327	27	
16	Polpharma Starogard Gdański (Note: The rule enforcing relegation of the last placed team was suspended as a result of an early termination of the championship.)	22	4	18	1776	2015	−239	26	

Source: PLK
(C) Champions

=== Results ===
Home \ Away	ANW	GDY	WRO	STA	GTK	RAD	LEG	BYD	MKS	POL	TOR	SPO	LUB	ZIE	SOP	SZC
Anwil Włocławek	—	83–65	96–85		118–74	78–82	105–79	76–70	112–88	110–72		110–84		79–95	84–86	110–82
Arka Gdynia		—	86–73	69–71	78–87		81–66		95–68	100–69	82–75	82–97	75–81		87–66	83–82
WKS Śląsk Wrocław		83–85	—	70–78	81–84	111–95		90–88	106–84	90–83	86–108	85–65			71–87	73–83
BM Slam Stal Ostrów Wielkopolski	96–98	63–62	80–100	—		59–51		88–94	87–77	81–72	85–72			72–78	89–71	71–96
GTK Gliwice	82–88	74–82		64–85	—		95–94		102–105	111–99		93–97		74–83	71–99	79–81
HydroTruck Radom		68–85	83–87	80–74	89–71	—	79–76	85–80	96–76		71–72	75–77	66–77	74–86		
Legia Warsaw	87–94		71–98	75–104		76–90	—	69–71	90–83	77–81	92–85			89–97	71–92	95–87
Enea Astoria Bydgoszcz	103–106	72–81		95–78	96–104	80–66	96–87	—	89–93		80–97	90–82	75–104	99–110		
MKS Dąbrowa Górnicza			98–94	88–82	81–86		95–103	72–86	—	74–84	85–96		66–74	81–97	62–87	
Polpharma Starogard Gdański	78–109		82–99	66–106	70–89	78–86		80–97		—	86–89	75–80	94–102		92–82	89–71
Polski Cukier Toruń	86–102	80–65			98–92	86–53	79–70		100–64		—		78–75	92–82		103–73
Spójnia Stargard		65–76	79–82	80–66	86–79		71–69		84–70	92–71	73–82	—	71–83	76–96	78–69	
Start Lublin	96–71	66–95		84–72	78–72	94–78	79–84		91–80	82–80		82–73	—	84–79		88–65
Stelmet Enea Zielona Góra	101–77	87–65	83–78	99–90		106–83	103–64	107–113	97–74	93–84			100–93	—		108–85
Trefl Sopot	64–77	79–86	86–76		99–94	84–83		87–78		95–91	63–80	68–64	82–95		—	90–77
King Szczecin			77–92	75–73	86–80	77–78	111–89	85–87	97–44		104–97	74–68	90–81		76–70	—

Updated to match(es) played on 12 March 2020. Source: PLK
Legend: Blue = home team win; Red = away team win.

== Polish clubs in European competitions ==
Team	Competition	Progress
Asseco Arka Gdynia	EuroCup	Regular season
Anwil Włocławek	Champions League	Regular season
Polski Cukier Toruń	Champions League	Regular season
Legia Warsaw	Champions League	Second qualifying round
Legia Warsaw	FIBA Europe Cup	Regular season

== Polish clubs in Regional competitions ==
Team	Competition	Progress
Stelmet Zielona Gora	VTB United League	Regular season
GTK Gliwice	Alpe Adria Cup	Regular season
