= Alexander Krutikov =

Russian politician

- Born: November 17, 1987 (age 38); Odintsovo, Soviet Union
- Occupation: Politician

Alexander Viktorovich Krutikov (Russian: Александр Викторович Крутиков; born 17 November 1987) is a Russian politician who served as the First Deputy Minister for the Development of the Russian Far East and Arctic in 2019–2021, being responsible for the domestic Arctic policy of Russia. Previously he served as Deputy Minister for the Development of the Russian Far East and Arctic in 2016–2019.

== Biography ==
From 2010 till 2014 Krutikov held various positions at Odintsovsky District (Moscow oblast):

- 2010 - Deputy of Odintsovsky District;
- 2012 - Chairman of the Public Chamber of Odintsovsky District;
- 2013 - First Deputy Head of the Odintsovsky District administration;
- 2013 - Co-founder of the All-Russia People's Front.

In 2014, after winning competition held by the Agency of Strategic Initiatives, he transferred to the Ministry for the Development of the Russian Far East, dealing with issues of territorial and socio-economic development. Since 2015 he was in charge of attracting investment projects to Russian Far East, first as Department Director, and since 2016 as Deputy Minister. During his service, he co-authored the Law on the Far Eastern Hectare, signed in 2016 by Russian president Vladimir Putin to give a hectare of free land for those willing to migrate to the Far East. Also, Krutikov was responsible for holding Eastern Economic Forum and building relations with countries of Southeast Asia.

In 2019, Russian prime minister Dmitry Medvedev proposed to empower the Ministry for the Development of the Far East with the authority to implement state policy in the Arctic. Presidential Envoy to the Far Eastern Federal District Yuri Trutnev said that Krutikov will oversee the development of the Arctic zone, calling Krutikov "experienced and qualified". After that, Krutikov was released from other areas of his work and began to deal exclusively with Arctic issues. During his service, the ministry developed the strategy for the development of the Arctic zone until 2035, which identified specific measures to ensure the national interests of Russia in the Arctic. A package of laws containing large-scale benefits for doing business in the Russian Arctic was also adopted. As a result, it has become the world's largest free economic zone with an area of more than 5 million square kilometers.

In 2021 Alexander Viktorovich Krutikov voluntarily left the civil service.
