= Astoria Bydgoszcz =

Enea Łaciate Astoria Bydgoszcz
- Nickname: Asta
- Leagues: PLK
- Founded: 8 April 1924; 102 years ago
- Arena: Grupa Moderator Arena, Toruńska street 59, 85-023 Bydgoszcz, Poland
- Capacity: 1,475
- Location: Bydgoszcz, Poland
- Team colors: Black and Red
- Main sponsor: Enea SA and Abramczyk
- President: Bartłomiej Dzedzej
- Head coach: Anders Sommer
- Team captain: Marcin Nowakowski
- Championships: 4 I Liga
- Retired numbers: 4, 6, 7
- Website: www.astoria.bydgoszcz.pl
Home	Away

Astoria Bydgoszcz, also known as simply Astoria, or known for sponsorship reasons as Enea Łaciate Astoria Bydgoszcz, is a Polish multi-sports club most known for the professional men's basketball team, based in Bydgoszcz. Currently playing in the I Liga and in the past in the Polish Basketball League (PLK) and the FIBA Korać Cup.

== History ==
In the 2018–19 season, Astoria defeated Śląsk Wrocław in the finals of the play-offs, thus crowning itself I Liga champions. The accomplishment gained the club promotion to the Polish Basketball League (PLK), for the first time in 13 years. Astoria Bydgoszcz also has a reserve team that plays in Polish third-tier level II Liga. The Astoria U-18 team won the Polish Championship in 1987 and became 2nd in 1988. The U-16 team won the Polish Championship in 1985 and became 2nd also in 1988.

== Honours ==
I Liga

- Winners (4): 1988–89, 2002–03, 2018–19, 2025–26

== Current roster ==
Note: Flags indicate national team eligibility at FIBA-sanctioned events. Players may hold other non-FIBA nationalities not displayed.

Enea Łaciate Astoria Bydgoszcz roster
Players
Coaches

Pos.	No.	Nat.	Name	Ht.	Wt.	Age
PG	0	(Nigeria)	Ogundiran, Jordan	1.80 m (5 ft 11 in)		29 – 30 November 1996
PG	1	(Poland)	Dzierżak, Wojciech	1.85 m (6 ft 1 in)		25 – 24 September 2001
C	2	(United States)	Thomas, Jalen	2.08 m (6 ft 10 in)		26 – 2 October 2000
SG	3	(Poland)	Kachelski, Mikołaj	1.87 m (6 ft 2 in)		20 – 25 November 2005
F/C	5	(Sweden)	Andersson, Denzel	2.04 m (6 ft 8 in)		30 – 21 September 1996
SG	8	(Germany)	Brembly, David	1.98 m (6 ft 6 in)		33 – 10 February 1993
G	9	(United States)	Taylor, Jayden	1.93 m (6 ft 4 in)		23 – 1 June 2003
G/F	11	(Poland)	Kamiński, Karol	1.95 m (6 ft 5 in)		29 – 28 October 1997
G	14	(United States)	Kimbrough, Martyce	1.85 m (6 ft 1 in)		30 – 8 January 1996
PF	21	(Poland)	Ptak, Bartosz	2.00 m (6 ft 7 in)		20 – 5 June 2006
C	23	(Poland)	Wińkowski, Piotr	2.08 m (6 ft 10 in)		23 – 4 August 2003
SF	44	(Estonia)	Toom, Hugo	2.00 m (6 ft 7 in)		24 – 25 October 2002
PG	55	(Poland)	Nowakowski, Marcin (C)	1.84 m (6 ft 0 in)		37 – 9 November 1989
SG	66	(Poland)	Kłaczek, Kacper	2.03 m (6 ft 8 in)		24 – 6 January 2002

Head coach

- (Denmark) Anders Sommer

Assistant coach(es)

- (Poland) Grzegorz Skiba
- (Poland) Piotr Derda
- (Poland) Marek Zapałowski

Legend

- (C) Team captain
- Injured

- Roster
Updated: November 7, 2026

== Team names ==
- Weltinex Astoria Bydgoszcz (1990–1991)
- Polfrost Astoria Bydgoszcz (1991–1992)
- Domar Astoria Bydgoszcz (1994)
- Samsung Astoria Bydgoszcz (1994–1995)
- BFM Astoria Bydgoszcz (1995–1996)
- Kujawiak-Astoria Bydgoszcz (1997–2000)
- Astoria Bydgoszcz (2000–2002)
- Wody Mineralne Ostromecko Astoria Bydgoszcz (2002)
- KPSW Astoria Bydgoszcz (2007)
- Enea Astoria Bydgoszcz (2017–2021)
- Enea Abramczyk Astoria Bydgoszcz (2021–2026)
- Enea Łaciate Astoria Bydgoszcz (2026–present)

== Seasons in the Polish Basketball League ==
- 1989–1990 - 12th place (relegation)
- 1991–1992 - 7th place (withdrawn)
- 2003–2004 - 8th place
- 2004–2005 – 5th place
- 2005–2006 – 9th place (withdrawn)
- 2019–2020 – 11th place
- 2020–2021 – 11th place
- 2021–2022 – 9th place
- 2022–2023 – 16th place (relegation)

== Results in European competitions ==
Season	Competition	Round	Opposition	Score
1991–92	FIBA Korać Cup	First round	(Belgium) Bobcat Gent	75–87 (H); 82–95 (A)

== Former notable players ==
- (Poland) Filip Dylewicz
- (Kosovo) Jaren Sina
- (Lithuania) Kęstutis Marčiulionis
- (Lithuania) Andrius Jurkūnas
- (Lithuania) Augenijus Vaškys
- (United States) Dante Swanson
- (United States) Ed O'Bannon
- (United States) Dennis Mims
- (United States) Kevin Fletcher
- (Lithuania) Arvydas Čepulis
- (United States) J. P. Prince
- (United States) Kris Clyburn

=== Retired numbers ===
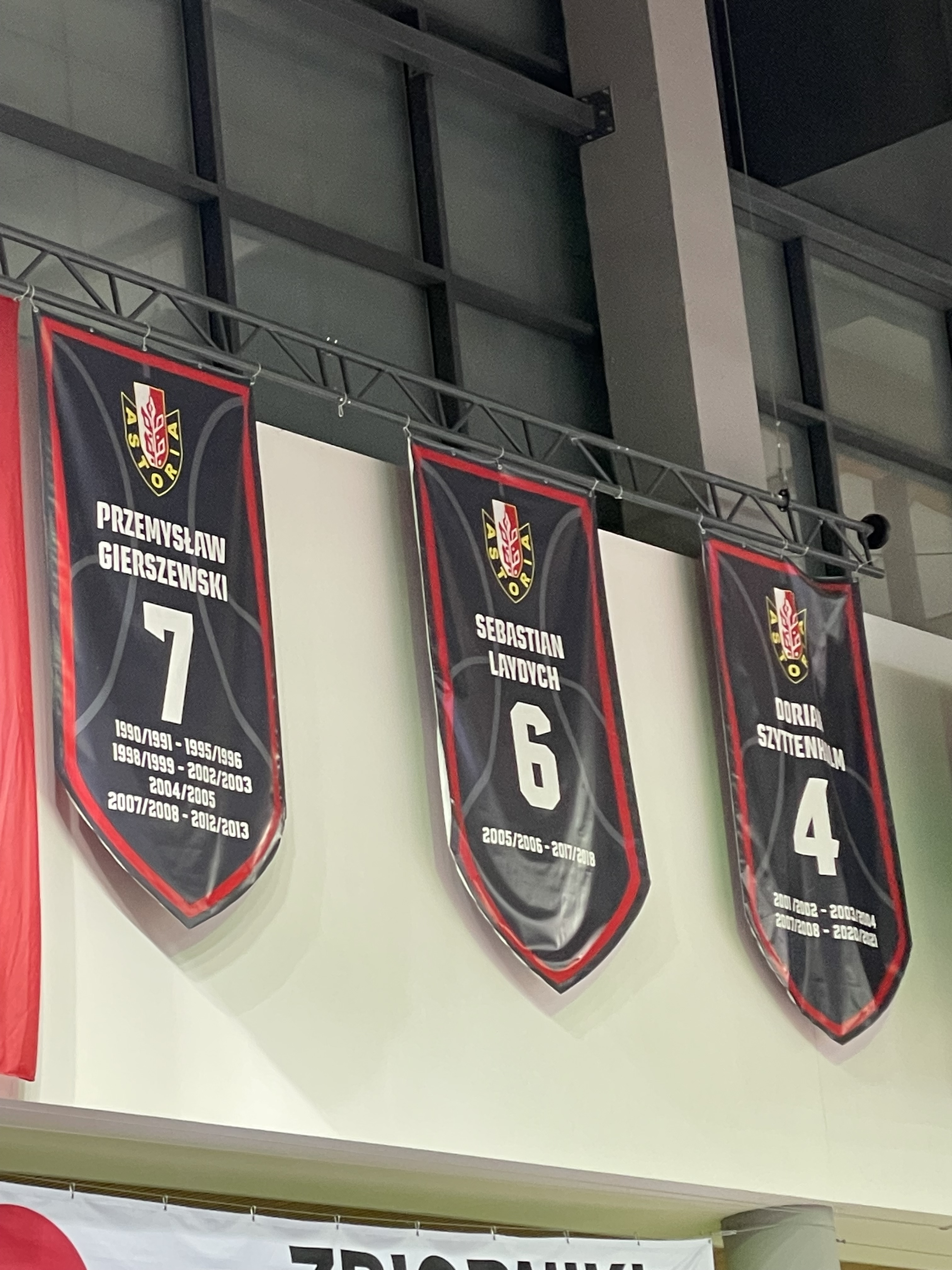
During Astoria's matches, banners commemorating three legends of the Bydgoszcz club are hung

- 4 Dorian Szyttenholm (born 1983) 2001–2004, 2007–2021
- 6 Sebastian Laydych (born 1987) 2005-2018
- 7 Przemysław Gierszewski (born 1970) 1990-1996, 1998-2003, 2004-2005, 2007-2014

== Former coaches ==
- (Poland) Zygmunt Weigt
- (Poland) Henryk Pietrzak
- (Poland) Aureliusz Gościniak
- (Poland) Roman Haber
- (Poland) Hilary Gierszewski
- (Poland) Maciej Mackiewicz
- (Poland) Jerzy Nowakowski
- (Belarus) / (Poland) Alexander Krutikov
- (Poland) Ryszard Mogiełka
- (Poland) Adam Ziemiński
- (Poland) Wojciech Krajewski
- (Poland) Tomasz Herkt
- (Poland) Jerzy Chudeusz
- (Poland) Jarosław Zawadka
- (Poland) Maciej Borkowski
- (Poland) Przemysław Gierszewski
- (Poland) Konrad Kaźmierczyk
- (Poland) Artur Gronek
- (Poland) Marek Popiołek
- (Greece) Atanasios Skurtopulos
- (Poland) Krzysztof Szubarga

== Other Sections ==
=== Boxing ===
- Jerzy Adamski
- Aleksy Kuziemski

=== Canoeing ===
- Dariusz Białkowski
- Zdzisław Szubski
- Sebastian Szubski

=== Swimming ===
- Alicja Pęczak
- Zbigniew Januszkiewicz

=== In past ===
- Association football
- Athletics
- Disabled sports
- Fencing
- Gymnastics
- Ice skating
- Table tennis
- Tennis
- Volleyball
