= Andrzej Mazurczak =

Polish basketball player (born 1993)

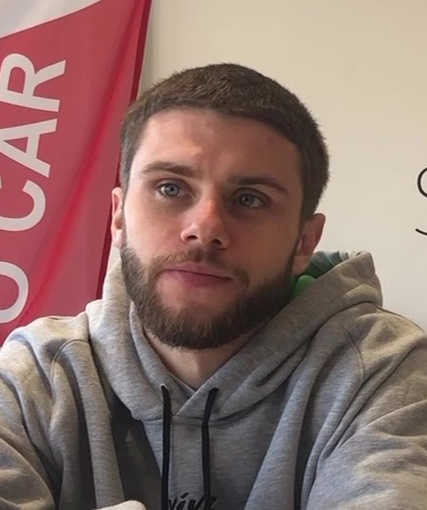

No. 3 – Zastal Zielona Góra
- Position: Point guard
- League: PLK

Personal information
- Born: 27 December 1993 (age 32) Chicago, Illinois, U.S.
- Listed height: 6 ft 2 in (1.88 m)
- Listed weight: 185 lb (84 kg)

Career information
- High school: Ridgewood (Norridge, Illinois)
- College: Wisconsin–Parkside (2012–2016)
- NBA draft: 2016: undrafted
- Playing career: 2016–present

Career history
- 2016–2017: Kavala
- 2017–2018: Niners Chemnitz
- 2018–2019: Cáceres
- 2019–2020: Aris Leeuwarden
- 2020–2021: MKS Dąbrowa Górnicza
- 2021–2022: Zastal Zielona Góra
- 2022–2025: Wilki Morskie Szczecin
- 2025–present: Zastal Zielona Góra

Career highlights
- PLK champion (2023); PLK Most Valuable Player (2023); 2× PLK Best Polish Player (2023); 2× All-PLK Team (2023, 2024); GLVC Player of the Year (2016); First-team All-GLVC (2016); Third-team All-GLVC (2015); GLVC Freshman of the Year (2013)

Andrzej “Andy” Piotr Mazurczak (born 27 December 1993) is a Polish professional basketball player for Zastal Zielona Góra in the Polish Basketball League (PLK).

== Professional career ==
He played for Kavala of the Greek A2 Ethniki on 2016–17 and for the NINERS Chemnitz of the German ProA league in the 2017–18 season.

On July 11, 2018, he signed with Cáceres Patrimonio de la Humanidad of the LEB Oro.

On 12 August 2019, Mazurczak signed with Aris Leeuwarden of the Dutch Basketball League (DBL). He led Aris in both scoring and assists, with 16.5 points and 5.5 assists per game before the season was cancelled due to the COVID-19 pandemic.

On July 29, 2021, he has signed with Stelmet Zielona Góra of the PLK.

On June 10, 2022, he has signed with Wilki Morskie Szczecin of the Polish Basketball League (PLK).

On June 1, 2025, he signed with Zastal Zielona Góra in the Polish Basketball League (PLK).

== National team career ==
In summer 2017, he was a member of Poland’s national basketball team.
