= Sokół Łańcut =

- Nickname: Sokoły
- League: I liga
- Established: 1990
- Arena: Hala MOSiR Łańcut, ul. Armii Krajowej
- Capacity: 800
- Location: Łańcut
- Team colours: Yellow Black
- Main sponsor: Solvera
- President: Sławomir Kuźniar
- Vice-president: Anna Kościńska
- Head coach: Dariusz Kaszowski
- Team captain: Filip Struski
- Ownership: Stowarzyszenie PTG Sokół w Łańcucie
- Website: sokollancut.pl
Home	Away

Sokół Łańcut, officially Solvera Sokół Łańcut for sponsorship reasons, is a Polish professional basketball club from Łańcut, Subcarpathian Voivodeship.

== Sponsorship and name changes ==
The club was previously officially called Sewertronics Sokół Łańcut, Muszynianka Domelo Sokół Łańcut and Rawlplug Sokół Łańcut after sponsorship deals from Sewertronics, Muszynianka, Domelo and Rawlplug respectively.

== History ==
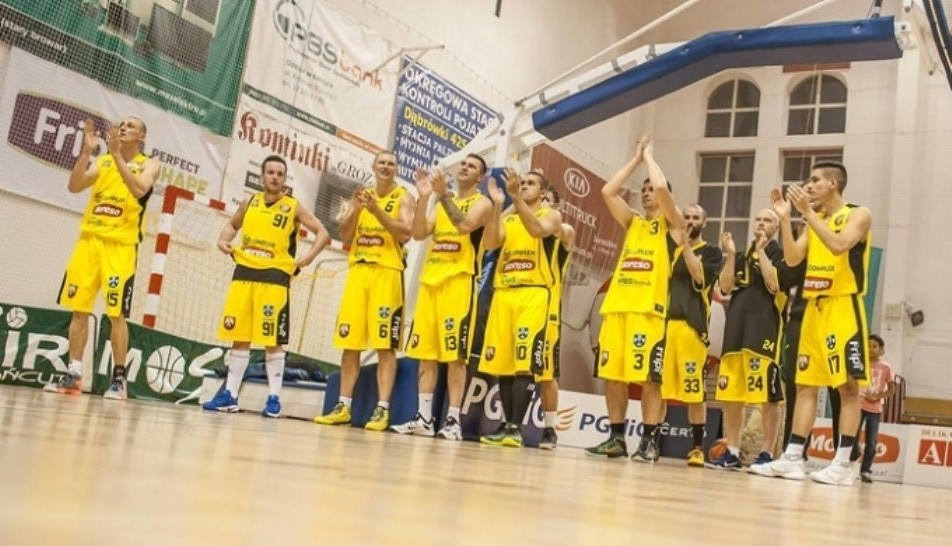
Sokół against Spójnia Stargard on 20 May 2017

The club was founded in 1990 on the basis of the local Sokół Gymnastics Society dating back to 1890. The club was entered into the lowest fourth division in 1992.

The club played in the third tier until a take over in 2000 propelled the club to win promotion the second tier in 2004, with 3–2 series win over AZS Radom. The club since then has become the one with the most seasons in that division.

After 6 failed promotion attempts in the play-offs since, the club achieved a historic promotion to the PLK in 2022. Their first PLK win was on 4 November 2022 away 83:74 against the favourites Start Lublin. Despite their minnow status they stayed in the league until 2024. Their two seasons in the top flight however caused their financial state to worsen. The club's coach at the time Marek Łukomski stated his extreme sadness and disappointment with the relegation.
