= Hala OSiR Bemowo =

Indoor arena in Warsaw, Poland

- Interactive map of Hala OSiR Bemowo
- Address: ul. Obrońców Tobruku 40 01-494, Fort Bema, Bemowo, Warsaw; Poland
- Coordinates: 52.1528°N 20.5550°E
- Capacity: 2,300 (concerts); 1,970 (basketball)

Tenants
- Legia Warsaw (basketball); Wisła Warszawa (volleyball); 2025 Polish Basketball Supercup

Website
- sport.um.warszawa.pl/waw/osir-bemowo

Hala OSiR Bemowo is a sports and recreation centre located in Bemowo, Warsaw, Poland. The hall was converted from a former aircraft hangar to the needs of indoor sports.

Over the years, the hall has undergone subsequent renovations – the parquet floor, changing rooms and all rooms were renovated, the lighting and sound system were replaced. Currently, the OSiR Bemowo sports hall is a multifunctional, fully modernized sports facility that can accommodate 1,416 spectators in the stands, and in the case of using the parquet floor area, even up to 2,300. It is possible to divide it into three sector pitches with curtains.

== Notable events ==
=== Basketball ===
- 2025 Polish Basketball Supercup

== See also ==
- List of indoor arenas in Poland
