= I Liga (basketball) =

- Organising body: Polish Basketball Association
- Founded: 1954; 72 years ago
- First season: 1954–55
- Country: Poland
- Confederation: FIBA Europe
- Number of teams: 18
- Level on pyramid: 2
- Promotion to: Polish Basketball League
- Relegation to: II Liga
- Current champions: Astoria Bydgoszcz (2nd title) (2025–26)

The I Liga (English: First League), officially known as the Bank Pekao S.A. I Liga due to its sponsorship by Bank Pekao, is the second-tier level league of basketball in Poland. It is organised by the Polish Basketball Association. Teams that win the championship have the option to be promoted to the first-tier level Polish Basketball League (PLK). The first I Liga season was held in the 1954–55 season.

== Recent champions ==
Season	Champions	Runners-up
2013–14	Polfarmex Kutno	MCKiS Jaworzno
2014–15	Stal Ostrów Wielkopolski	Politechnika Poznańska
2015–16	Miasto Szkła Krosno	Legia Warsaw
2016–17	Legia Warsaw	GTK Gliwice
2017–18	Spójnia Stargard	Sokół Łańcut
2018–19	Astoria Bydgoszcz	Śląsk Wrocław
2019–20	Górnik Wałbrzych	Czarni Słupsk
2020–21	Czarni Słupsk	Górnik Wałbrzych
2021–22	Sokół Łańcut	Górnik Wałbrzych
2022–24	Dziki Warsaw	Górnik Wałbrzych
2023–24	Górnik Wałbrzych	Astoria Bydgoszcz
2024–25	Miasto Szkła Krosno	Astoria Bydgoszcz
2025–26	Astoria Bydgoszcz	ŁKS Coolpack Łódź
