= PLK Top Scorer =

Polish basketball award

The Polish Basketball League Top Scorer contains a list of the Polish Basketball League (PLK)'s full season scoring leaders. Both regular season and playoff games are counted in the stats leaders. Edward Jurkiewicz led the league in points per game a record 8 times, in the years 1970, 1971, 1972, 1974, 1975, 1976, 1977, and 1978.

== Polish League full season top scorers by total points scored ==
Player (X)	Number of times leading the league

- Counting both regular season and playoff games.
- Nationality by national team.

Season	Player	Team	Total Points Scored
1947–48	(Poland) Antoni Kolaśniewski	ZZK Poznań	222
1948–49	(Poland) Antoni Kolaśniewski	ZZK Poznań	145
1949–50	(Poland) Mieczysław Pawlak	Społem Łódź	357
1950–51	(Poland) Zdzisław Dąbrowski	Gwardia Kraków	299
1951–52	(Poland) Zdzisław Dąbrowski (2×)	Gwardia Kraków	233
1952–53	(Poland) Jan Appenheimer	Spójnia Gdańsk	234
1953–54	(Poland) Jan Appenheimer (2×)	Spójnia Gdańsk	380
1954–55	(Poland) Andrzej Nartowski	AZS Warszawa	399
1955–56	(Poland) Janusz Wichowski	Polonia Warszawa	385
1956–57	(Poland) Janusz Wichowski (2×)	Polonia Warszawa	309
1957–58	(Poland) Janusz Wichowski (3×)	Polonia Warszawa	394
1958–59	(Poland) Janusz Wichowski (4×)	Polonia Warszawa	599
1959–60	(Poland) Janusz Wichowski (5×)	(Poland) Polonia Warszawa	563
1960–61	(Poland) Mieczysław Łopatka	Lech Poznań	582
1961–62	(Poland) Jerzy Piskun	Polonia Warszawa	606
1962–63	(Poland) Mieczysław Łopatka (2×)	Śląsk Wrocław	678
1963–64	(Poland) Janusz Wichowski (6×)	Legia Warszawa	593
1964–65	(Poland) Ryszard Olszewski	AZS Toruń	463
1965–66	(Poland) Mieczysław Łopatka (3×)	Śląsk Wrocław	634
1966–67	(Poland) Mieczysław Łopatka (4×)	Śląsk Wrocław	500
1967–68	(Poland) Bohdan Likszo	Wisła Kraków	572
1968–69	(Poland) Bohdan Likszo (2×)	Wisła Kraków	576
1969–70	(Poland) Edward Jurkiewicz	Wybrzeże Gdańsk	636
1970–71	(Poland) Edward Jurkiewicz (2×)	Wybrzeże Gdańsk	1,198
1971–72	(Poland) Edward Jurkiewicz (3×)	Wybrzeże Gdańsk	642
1972–73	(Poland) Paweł Waniorek	Pogoń Szczecin	822
1973–74	(Poland) Edward Jurkiewicz (4×)	Wybrzeże Gdańsk	1,005
1974–75	(Poland) Edward Jurkiewicz (5×)	Wybrzeże Gdańsk	1,179
1975–76	(Poland) Edward Jurkiewicz (6×)	Wybrzeże Gdańsk	1,146
1976–77	(Poland) Edward Jurkiewicz (7×)	Wybrzeże Gdańsk	1,717
1977–78	(Poland) Edward Jurkiewicz (8×)	Wybrzeże Gdańsk	1,019
1978–79	(Poland) Eugeniusz Kijewski	Lech Poznań	866
1979–80	(Poland) Mieczysław Młynarski	Górnik Wałbrzych	1002
1980–81	(Poland) Mieczysław Młynarski (2×)	Górnik Wałbrzych	1,110
1981–82	(Poland) Eugeniusz Kijewski (2)	Lech Poznań	737
1982–83	(Poland) Mieczysław Młynarski (3×)	Górnik Wałbrzych	840
1983–84	(Poland) Mieczysław Młynarski (4×)	Górnik Wałbrzych	762
1984–85	(Poland) Eugeniusz Kijewski (3×)	Lech Poznań	758
1985–86	(Poland) Eugeniusz Kijewski (4×)	Lech Poznań	906
1986–87	(Poland) Dariusz Zelig	Śląsk Wrocław	792
1987–88	(Poland) Eugeniusz Kijewski (5×)	Lech Poznań	654
1988–89	(Poland) Leszek Doliński	AZS Koszalin	910
1989–90	(Poland) Leszek Doliński (2×)	AZS Koszalin	1,060
1990–91	(Poland) Dariusz Zelig (2×)	Śląsk Wrocław	1,131
1991–92	(Poland) Maciej Zieliński	Śląsk Wrocław	953
1992–93	(Poland) Igor Griszczuk	Nobiles Włocławek	1,044
1993–94	(Poland) Wojciech Królik	Polonia Warszawa	1,064
1994–95	(United States) Nathan Buntin	Polonia Przemyśl	837
1995–96	(United States) Ronnie Battle	10.5 Basket Club	808
1996–97	(United States) Tyrone Thomas	Dojlidy Instal	1,216

== Polish League full season top scorers by points per game ==
Player (X)	Number of times leading the league

- Counting both regular season and playoff games.
- Nationality by national team.

Season	Player	Team	Points Per Game
1997–98	(United States) Samuel Hines	Pogoń Ruda Śląska	27.0
1998–99	(United States) Kendall Williams	Trefl Prokom Sopot	24.2
1999–00	(United States) Samuel Hines (2)	Unia Tarnów	23.3
2000–01	(Bosnia and Herzegovina) Aleksandar Nikolić	AZS Lublin	22.9
2001–02	(United States) Alex Austin	Noteć Inowrocław	28.1
2002–03	(United States) Alex Austin (2)	Noteć Inowrocław	21.1
2003–04	(United States) Brent Darby	AZS Koszalin / Spójnia Stargard	20.7
2004–05	(United States) Michael Ansley	Unia Tarnów	23.1
2005–06	(United States) Chudney Gray	AZS Koszalin	23.3
2006–07	(Nigeria) Patrick Okafor	Polpharma	17.4
2007–08	(United States) Donald Copeland	Polpharma	19.5
2008–09	(United States) Qyntel Woods	Trefl Prokom Sopot	19.2
2009–10	(Turkey) Michael Wright	PGE Turów Zgorzelec	21.0
2010–11	(United States) Ted Scott	Kotwica Kołobrzeg	25.4
2011–12	(United States Virgin Islands) Walter Hodge	Stelmet Zielona Góra	19.4
2012–13	(Poland) Jakub Dłoniak	Siarka Tarnobrzeg	20.1
2013–14	(Lithuania) Deividas Dulkys	Anwil Włocławek	16.4
2014–15	(United States) Dominique Johnson	Siarka Tarnobrzeg	23.0
2015–16	(United States) Jarvis Williams	Siarka Tarnobrzeg	17.2
2016–17	(Poland) Krzysztof Szubarga	Asseco Gdynia	18.0
2017–18	(United States) Anthony Beane	Legia Warszawa	22.4
2018–19	(United States) Jabarie Hinds	Miasto Szkła Krosno	21.7
2019–20	(Poland) Michał Michalak	Legia Warszawa	21.9
2020–21	(United States) Jabarie Hinds (2)	HydroTruck Radom	21.7
2021–22	(United States) Jonah Mathews	Anwil Włocławek	19.0
2022–23	(United States) Jeremiah Martin	Śląsk Wrocław	19.1
2023–24	(United States) Liam O'Reilly	Polski Cukier Pszczółka Start Lublin	21.4
2024–25	(United States) Kameron McGusty	Legia Warsaw	19.9
2025–26	(United States) Landrius Horton	Dziki Warsaw	19.7
