= PLK Most Valuable Player =

The PLK Most Valuable Player award is given annually at the end of the regular season of the Polish Basketball League (PLK), the highest professional basketball league in Poland, to the most valuable player of the league. Originally, the award was given by the now defunct Polish I Liga (Polish League 1), and was called the Polish League 1 Player of the Year. The current award, given by the Polish PLK League, began when that league started, with the 1995–96 season.

== I Liga Player of the Year winners (1961–1995) ==
- Player nationalities by national team:

Season	Player	Nationality	Team
1960–61	Ryszard Olszewski	Poland	AZS Toruń
1961–62	Not awarded		
1962–63	Not awarded		
1963–64	Not awarded		
1964–65	Mieczysław Łopatka	Poland	Śląsk Wrocław
1965–66	Not awarded		
1966–67	Not awarded		
1967–68	Wiesław Langiewicz	Poland	Wisła Kraków
1968–69	Mieczysław Łopatka (2)	Poland	Śląsk Wrocław
1969–70	Bolesław Kwiatkowski	Poland	AZS Warszawa
1970–71	Edward Jurkiewicz	Poland	Wybrzeże Gdańsk
1971–72	Not awarded		
1972–73	Andrzej Seweryn	Poland	Wisła Kraków
1973–74	Andrzej Seweryn (2)	Poland	Wisła Kraków
1974–75	Zdzisław Myrda	Poland	Resovia Rzeszów
1975–76	Edward Jurkiewicz (2)	Poland	Wybrzeże Gdańsk
1976–77	Edward Jurkiewicz (3)	Poland	Wybrzeże Gdańsk
1977–78	Wojciech Fiedorczuk	Poland	ŁKS Łódź
1978–79	Eugeniusz Kijewski	Poland	Lech Poznań
1979–80	Kent Washington	United States	Start Lublin
1980–81	Mieczysław Młynarski	Poland	Górnik Wałbrzych
1981–82	Eugeniusz Kijewski (2)	Poland	Lech Poznań
1982–83	Dariusz Szczubiał	Poland	Zagłębie Sosnowiec
1983–84	Krzysztof Fikiel	Poland	Wisła Kraków
1984–85	Dariusz Zelig	Poland	Śląsk Wrocław
1985–86	Eugeniusz Kijewski (3)	Poland	Lech Poznań
1986–87	Dariusz Zelig (2)	Poland	Śląsk Wrocław
1987–88	Not awarded		
1988–89	Not awarded		
1989–90	Jarosław Jechorek	Poland	Lech Poznań
1990–91	Not awarded		
1991–92	Maciej Zieliński	Poland	Śląsk Wrocław
1992–93	Igor Griszczuk	Poland	Anwil Włocławek
1993–94	Keith Williams	United States	Śląsk Wrocław
1994–95	Tyrice Walker	United States	MKS Znicz Pruszków

== PLK MVP winners (1996–present) ==
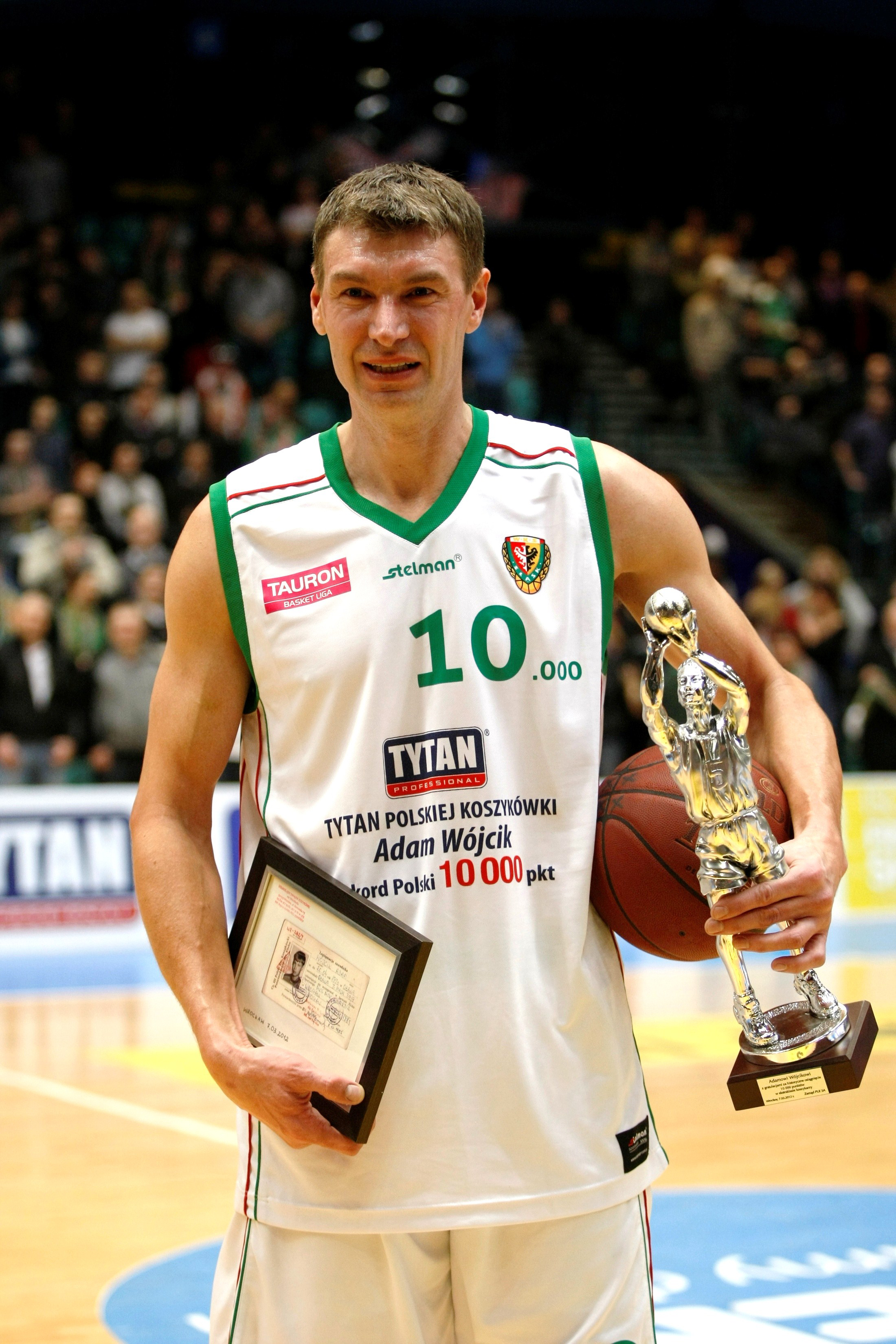
Adam Wójcik is tied for the record of the most Player of the Year/MVP awards won, with three.

^	Denotes player who is still active in the PLK
*	Inducted into the FIBA Hall of Fame
†	Denotes player whose team won championship that year
Player (X)	Denotes the number of times the player has been named MVP
Team (X)	Denotes the number of times a player from this team has won

- Player nationalities by national team:

Season	Player	Pos.	Nationality	Team	Ref.
1995–96†	Dominik Tomczyk	PF/C	Poland	Śląsk Wrocław	
1996–97	Maciej Zieliński (2)	SG	Poland	Śląsk Wrocław (2)	
1997–98†	Adam Wójcik	PF/C	Poland	Śląsk Wrocław (3)	
1998–99†	Maciej Zieliński (3)	SG	Poland	Śląsk Wrocław (4)	
1999–00	Not awarded				
2000–01†	Adam Wójcik (2)	PF/C	Poland	Śląsk Wrocław (5)	
2001–02†	Dominik Tomczyk (2)	PF/C	Poland	Śląsk Wrocław (6)	
2002–03	Joe McNaull	C	United States; Poland	Prokom Trefl Sopot	
2003–04†	Tomas Pačėsas	PG	Lithuania	Prokom Trefl Sopot (2)	
2004–05†	Adam Wójcik (3)	PF/C	Poland	Prokom Trefl Sopot (3)	
2005–06†	Goran Jagodnik	PF	Slovenia	Prokom Trefl Sopot (4)	
2006–07	Thomas Kelati	SG/SF	Poland	BOT Turów Zgorzelec	
2007–08	David Logan	PG/SG	Poland	PGE Turów Zgorzelec (2)	
2008–09	Not awarded				
2009–10†	Qyntel Woods	SF	United States	Asseco Prokom Gdynia (5)	
2010–11	Torey Thomas	PG	United States	PGE Turów Zgorzelec (3)	
2011–12	Walter Hodge	PG	U.S. Virgin Islands Puerto Rico	Stelmet Zielona Góra	
2012–13†	Walter Hodge (2)	PG	U.S. Virgin Islands Puerto Rico	Stelmet Zielona Góra (2)	
2013–14†	J.P. Prince	SG/SF	United States	PGE Turów Zgorzelec (4)	
2014–15	Damian Kulig^	PF/C	Poland	PGE Turów Zgorzelec (5)	
2015–16†	Mateusz Ponitka	SG/SF	Poland	Stelmet Zielona Góra (3)	
2016–17	Shawn King	C	Saint Vincent	Stal Ostrów Wielkopolski	
2017–18†	Ivan Almeida	F	Cape Verde	Anwil Włocławek	
2018–19	James Florence	PG	United States	Arka Gdynia (6)	
2019–20	Not awarded^{1}				
2020–21	Geoffrey Groselle	C	United States	Zastal Zielona Góra (4)	
2021–22†	Travis Trice	PG	United States	WKS Śląsk Wrocław (7)	
2022–23†	Andrzej Mazurczak^	PG	Poland	Wilki Morskie Szczecin	
2023–24	Victor Sanders	SG	United States	Anwil Włocławek	
2024–25†	Kameron McGusty	SG	United States	Legia Warszawa	
2025–26†	Andrzej Pluta Jr.^	PG	Poland	Legia Warszawa	

^1 There was no awarding in the 2019–20 season, because the season was cancelled due to the coronavirus pandemic in Poland.

== Multiple honors (1996–present) ==
=== Players ===
Rank	Player	Trophies	Years
1.	(Poland) Adam Wójcik	3	1998, 2001, 2005
1.	(Poland) Maciej Zieliński	3	1992, 1997, 1999
2.	(Poland) Dominik Tomczyk	2	1996, 2002
2.	(United States Virgin Islands) Walter Hodge	2	2012, 2013

=== Player nationality ===
Rank	Country	Total
1.	Poland	14
2.	United States	8
3.	U.S. Virgin Islands	2
4.	Slovenia	1
4.	Lithuania	1
4.	Saint Vincent and the Grenadines	1
4.	Cape Verde	1

=== Teams ===
Rank	Team	Total
1.	WKS Śląsk Wrocław	7
2.	Prokom Trefl Sopot / Arka Gdynia	6
3.	PGE Turów Zgorzelec	5
4.	Zastal Zielona Góra	4
5.	Anwil Włocławek	2
5.	Legia Warszawa	2
6.	Stal Ostrów Wielkopolski	1
6.	Wilki Morskie Szczecin	1
