= Mieczysław Łopatka =

Polish basketball player and coach

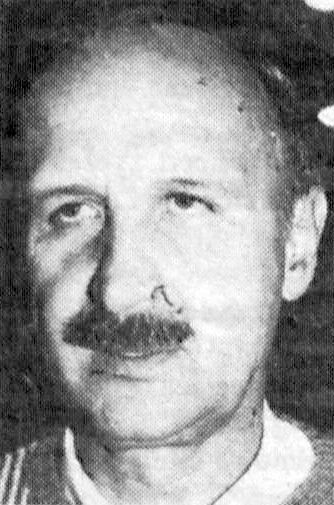

Personal information
- Born: October 10, 1939 (age 87) Drachowo, Poland
- Listed height: 196 cm (6 ft 5 in)
- Listed weight: 96 kg (212 lb)

Career information
- Playing career: 1955–1976
- Position: Small forward
- Coaching career: 1972–1994

Career history

Playing
- 1955–1958: Kolejarz Gniezno
- 1958–1961: Lech Poznań
- 1961–1972: Śląsk Wrocław
- 1972–1975: Montbrison
- 1975–1976: Élan Chalon-sur-Saône

Coaching
- 1972–1975: Montbrison (player-coach)
- 1975–1976: Élan Chalon-sur-Saône (player-coach)
- 1976–1982: Śląsk Wrocław
- 1985: Standard Liège
- 1990–1994: Śląsk Wrocław

Career highlights
- As a player: FIBA European Selection (1969); 2× Polish League champion (1965, 1970); Polish Cup winner (1972); 2× Polish League Player of the Year (1965, 1969); 4× Polish League Top Scorer (1961, 1963, 1966, 1967); As a head coach: 8× Polish League champion (1977, 1979–1981, 1991–1994); 3× Polish Cup winner (1977, 1980, 1992)
- FIBA Hall of Fame
Medals
Representing Poland
Men's basketball
EuroBasket
Silver medal – second place	1963 Poland
Bronze medal – third place	1965 Soviet Union
Bronze medal – third place	1967 Finland

Mieczysław Edwin Łopatka (born 10 October 1939) is a Polish former professional basketball player and coach. At a height of 1.96 m (6 ft 5 in) tall, and a weight of 96 kg (212 lb), he played at the small forward position.

== Club career ==
Łopatka was a member of the FIBA European Selection, in 1969. He won 2 Polish League championships (1965, 1970), and the Polish Cup (1972). He led the Polish League in scoring 4 times (1961, 1963, 1966, 1967), and he was a two time Polish League Player of the Year (1965, 1969).

== National team career ==
As a member of the senior Polish national basketball team, Łopatka competed at four Summer Olympic Games (1960, 1964, 1968, 1972). He won a silver medal at EuroBasket 1963, and bronze medals at EuroBasket 1965, and EuroBasket 1967. He was a member of the FIBA World Cup All-Tournament Team, at the 1967 FIBA World Championship, and he also led the tournament in scoring.

== Coaching career ==
In his coaching career, Łopatka won 8 Polish League championships (1977, 1979, 1980, 1981, 1991, 1992, 1993, 1994), and 3 Polish Cups (1977, 1980, 1992).
