= Kent Washington =

American basketball player (born 1956)

Personal information
- Born: January 10, 1956 (age 70) New Rochelle, New York, U.S.
- Listed height: 178 cm (5 ft 10 in)

Career information
- High school: New Rochelle High School
- College: Southampton College (1974–1978)
- Drafted by: Los Angeles Lakers
- Playing career: 1974–1995
- Position: Point guard

Career history

Playing
- 1978–81: Start Lublin
- 1981–83: Zagłębie Sosnowiec
- 1983–8?: IFK Linköping
- 198?–19??: Plannja Basket Luleå
- 19??–1995: BC Växjö

Coaching
- IFK Linköping
- Luleå BBK
- 1997–?: Iona Gaels
- 2000–04: Mercy College

Kent "Nut" Washington (born January 10, 1956) is an American former professional basketball player. He was the first American as well as the first black professional basketball player to play behind the Iron Curtain. He played professional basketball in the Polish People's Republic from 1979–83. He was the PLK Most Valuable Player in 1980. He won the Polish Cup in 1983. In total, he played professional basketball in Europe for 14 years. He is the author of the 2021 memoir Kentomania: A Black Basketball Virtuoso in Communist Poland.

== Early and personal life ==
Washington was born in New Rochelle, New York, to Ralph (New Rochelle’s first black police detective) and Cloteal Washington. He has an older brother, Kurt. He attended New Rochelle Public Schools. He was New Rochelle High School’s starting point guard, was All-Conference and All-County, and was MVP of the Westchester Holiday Tournament. He graduated in 1973.

He received a four-year scholarship to NCAA Division II Southampton College (now Stony Brook Southampton). There, he majored in sociology and scored 1,082 points for the Colonials. He was team captain in 1976 and 1977. In his junior year in college Washington averaged 15 points and 8 assists per game, shooting 54% from the floor. He completed his career as the school's career assists leader. He was drafted by the Los Angeles Lakers in the 10th round in 1977. He was 5 feet 8 inches tall.

Playing in Sweden, Washington met his future wife, Susanne. Their daughter, Kehli, was born in Sweden, became a star softball player for New Rochelle High School, Rider University, and the Swedish national softball team, and played softball professionally in the Netherlands.

== Basketball career ==
=== Poland ===
In 1979, at the age of 23, Washington became the first American as well as the first black professional basketball player to play behind the Iron Curtain. He played professional basketball in the Polish People's Republic from 1978–83. In Poland, he played for Start Lublin from 1979–81, with the team winning bronze medals in 1979 and 1980, and for Zagłębie Sosnowiec from 1981–83. In total, he played professional basketball in Europe for 14 years.

In 1986, between seasons in Poland, Washington played for the New Jersey Jammers in the United States Basketball League, which were coached by Nate Archibald.

In Poland, Washington averaged 20 points per game, and playing in the Polish Basketball League (PLK) was the PLK Most Valuable Player in 1980. He won the Polish Cup in 1983 with Zagłębie Sosnowiec.

His popularity was so great in PRL-era Poland during his five seasons there between 1978 and 1983 that it was dubbed "Kentomania". Washington, a black man, was a novelty for Polish fans; he said: "They touched my hair and my skin out of curiosity." One time a two-year-old bit Washington on his finger, thinking he was chocolate. Reportedly soldiers assigned to crack down on public gatherings as part of a national martial law decree would abandon their tanks to seek his autograph. Washington also appeared in the 1981 Polish comedy cult film Miś.

=== Sweden ===
Washington later played professionally for 10 years in Sweden. He played for three teams in its top league—IFK Linköping, Plannja Basket Luleå, and BC Växjö, led the league in scoring in 1985–86, and averaged 23 points per game in his Swedish career. At 38 years of age he retired.

=== Coaching ===
Washington coached women's basketball in Sweden for two years. In 1997, he and his wife and daughter returned to New Rochelle.

Washington then coached the women's basketball teams at Iona University (beginning in 1997) and Mercy College in Westchester (2000–04), and worked as a teacher's assistant at Washington Irving School in Tarrytown, New York.

== Honors ==
Washington was inducted into the New Rochelle Sports Hall of Fame in 2002. He was inducted into the Westchester Sports Hall of Fame in 2021.

== Memoir ==
Washington is the author of the 2021 memoir Kentomania: A Black Basketball Virtuoso in Communist Poland.

== Bibliography ==
- Autobiography: Kent Washington (2021). Kentomania: A Black Basketball Virtuoso in Communist Poland. independent. pp. 1–247. ISBN 9798786557979.
