= Eugeniusz Kijewski =

Polish basketball player (born 1955)

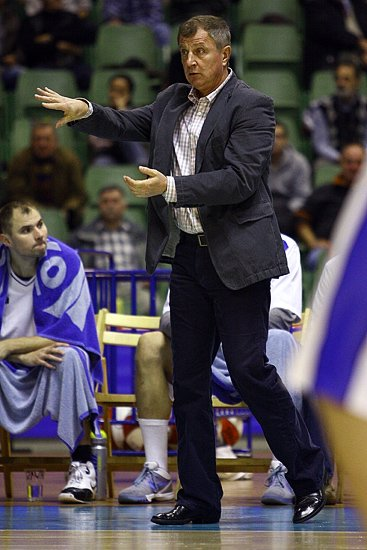
- Eugeniusz Kijewski in 2009

Personal information
- Born: 25 June 1955 (age 71) Poznań, Poland
- Listed height: 6 ft 1.25 in (1.86 m)
- Listed weight: 175 lb (79 kg)

Career information
- Playing career: 1969–1990
- Position: Point guard
- Coaching career: 1990–2015

Career history

Playing
- 1969–1975: Warta Poznań
- 1975–1976: Sbójnia Gdańsk
- 1976–1990: Lech Poznań

Coaching
- 1990–1997: Lech Poznań
- 1993–1998: Poland
- 1998–1999: Włocławek
- 1999–2007: Prokom Trefl Sopot
- 2008–2009: PBG Poznań
- 2012–2013: Twarde Pierniki Toruń
- 2015: Poland Under-18 (assistant)

Career highlights
- As player: 4× Polish Premier League champion (1983, 1984, 1989, 1990); Polish Cup winner (1984); 3× Polish Premier League MVP (1979, 1982, 1986); 5× Polish Premier League Top Scorer (1979, 1982, 1985, 1986, 1988); 10× All-Polish Premier League Team (1979, 1980, 1982–1984, 1986–1990); FIBA European Championship for Juniors Top Scorer (1974); Polish Junior Club Championship champion (1974); Polish Junior Club Championship Top Scorer (1974); Knight's Cross of the Order of Polonia Restituta (2021); As head coach: 4× Polish Premier League champion (2004–2007); 3× Polish Cup winner (2000, 2001, 2006); Polish Supercup winner (2001); 2× Polish Premier League Best Coach (2004, 2006)

Eugeniusz Kijewski (born 25 June 1955) is a Polish former professional basketball player and coach. Kijewski, who is considered to be one of the best Polish basketball players of all-time, won four Polish Premier League championships, three Polish Premier League MVP awards, and he led the Polish Premier League in scoring five times, during his pro club playing career. Kijewski is the all-time leading scorer in the history of the Polish Premier League, since the year 1976, when the Polish Basketball Association officially began to keep the records of individual player statistics. In 2021, he was awarded the Knight's Cross of the Order of Polonia Restituta.

== Youth club career ==
During his youth club career, Kijewski played with the junior teams of Warta Poznań. With Warta, he won the Polish Junior Club Championship title in 1974. He was the leading scorer of the competition.

== Club career ==
Kijewski started his senior club playing career with Warta Poznań, where he played from 1969 to 1975. He then spent the 1975–76 season with Sbójnia Gdańsk. After that, he played with Lech Poznań, from 1976 to 1990. With Lech, he won the Polish Premier League championship four times.

Kijewski was the Polish Premier League's Top Scorer a total of five times. He led the Polish Premier League in scoring in the: 1978–79 season, with a scoring average of 28.9 points per game, in the 1981–82 season, with a scoring average of 29.5 points per game, in the 1984–85 season, with a scoring average of 28.1 points per game, in the 1985–86 season, with a scoring 31.2 points per game, and in the 1987–88 season, with a scoring average of 24.2 points per game. The best single-game scoring mark in his senior club career, was 53 points scored in a game between Warta Poznań and Baildon Katowice, during the 1977–78 season. In 395 games played in the modern era of the Polish Premier League (1976–present), he scored a total of 10,185 points, for a career scoring average of 25.8 points per game.

== National team career ==
=== Polish junior national team ===
Kijewski was a member of the Polish junior national teams. He represented Poland at the 1974 FIBA European Championship for Juniors, where Poland finished in sixth place in the tournament. He was the tournament's leading scorer, with a scoring average of 27.2 points per game. He was also named to the competition's All-Tournament Team.

=== Polish senior national team ===
Kijewski was a member of the senior men's Polish national team. He played with Poland at the 1976 FIBA European Olympic Qualifying Tournament, and at the 1976 Pre-Olympic Tournament. He also played at the 1979 FIBA EuroBasket, and at the 1980 FIBA European Olympic Qualifying Tournament.

Kijewski also competed with Poland at the 1980 Moscow Summer Olympics, where they finished in seventh place. He also represented Poland at the 1981 FIBA EuroBasket, and at the 1983 FIBA EuroBasket. While playing with Poland, Kijewski had a total of 220 caps, in which he scored a total of 3,092 points, for a career scoring average of 14.1 points per game.

== Coaching career ==
=== Clubs ===
Right after he finished his club playing career, Kijewski became a basketball coach. He was the head coach of the Polish Premier League club Lech Poznań, from 1990 to 1997. After that, he was the head coach of the Polish club Włocławek, from 1997 to 1999. Kijewski was also Prokom Trefl Sopot's head coach, from 2000 to 2007. Under his coaching leadership, Prokom won the Polish Premier League championship in four consecutive years, from 2004 to 2007. He also coached the Polish club PBG Poznań, in the 2008–09 season. After that, he was the head coach of the Polish club Twarde Pierniki Toruń, during the 2012–13 season.

=== National teams ===
Kijewski also worked as the head coach of the senior men's Polish national team. He was Poland's head coach for five years, from 1993 to 1998. He coached Poland at the 1997 FIBA EuroBasket, where they finished the tournament in seventh place.
