= 2019 Polish Basketball Cup =

Polish Basketball Cup
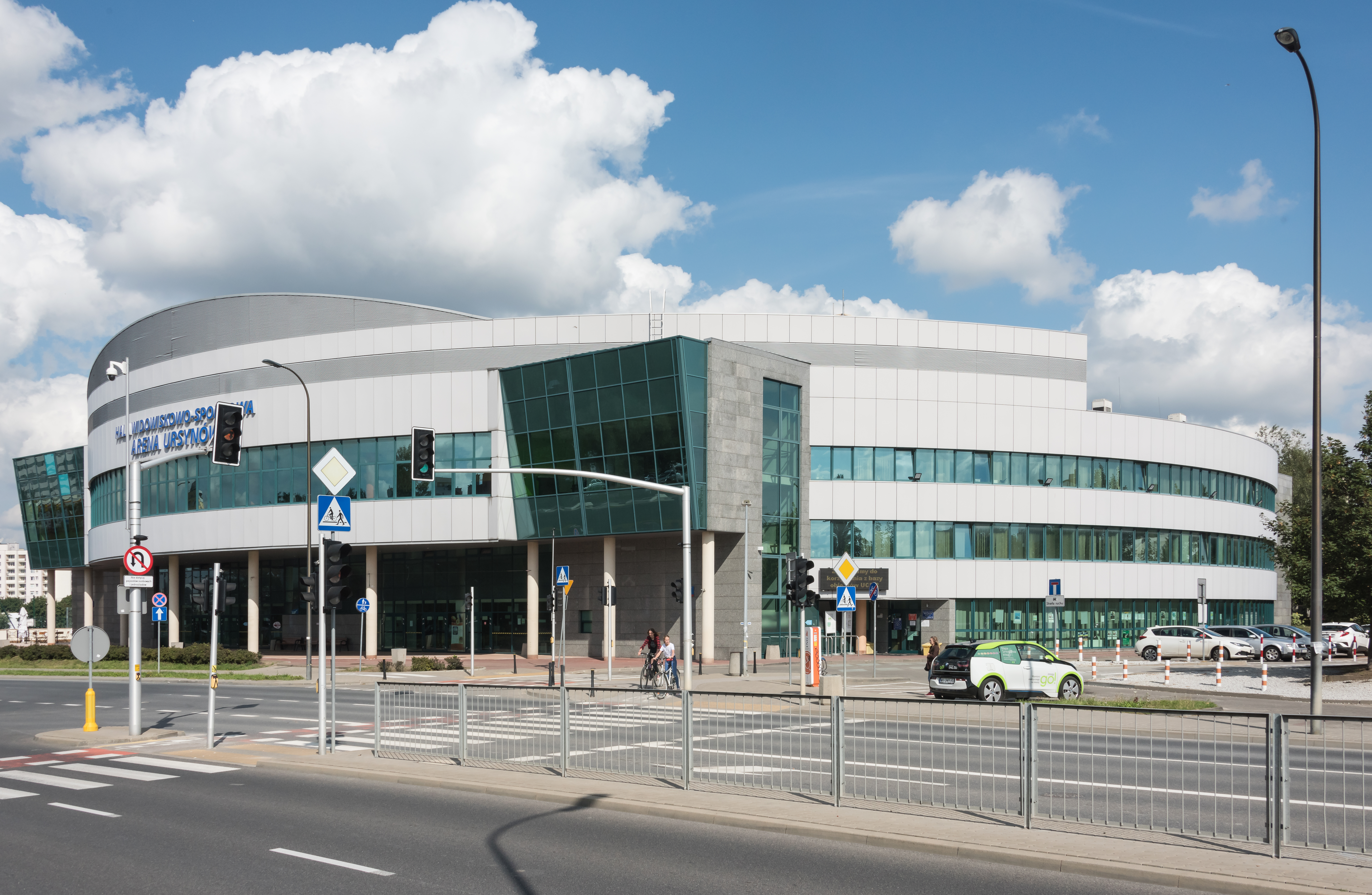
- The Arena Ursynów hosted the tournament
- Season: 2019
- Duration: 14–17 February
- Games played: 7
- Teams: 8

Finals
- Champions: Arged BMSlam Stal (1st title)
- Runners-up: Arka Gdynia

Awards
- MVP: Mateusz Kostrzewski

The 2019 Suzuki Polish Basketball Cup (Polish: Puchar Polski 2019) was the 56th edition of Poland's national cup competition for men basketball teams. It was managed by the Polish Basketball League (PLK) and was held in Warsaw, in the Arena Ursynów for the third time in a row in February 2019. BM Slam Stal Ostrów Wielkopolski won its first-ever Cup title in club history.

== Qualified teams ==
The eight first qualified after the first half of the 2018–19 PLK season qualified to the tournament. The highest placed four teams would play the lowest seeded teams in the quarter-finals. Legia Warsaw qualified as host of the tournament, and gained automatic qualification.

== Bracket ==
Quarter-finals
14 February
Legia Warsaw	64
Polpharma Starogard Gdański	74
14 February
Stelmet Zielona Góra	64
Arged BMSlam Stal	71
15 February
Polski Cukier Toruń	91
MKS Dąbrowa Górnicza	97
15 February
Anwil Włocławek	80
Arka Gdynia	84

Semi-finals
16 February
Polpharma Starogard Gdański	66
Arged BMSlam Stal	76
16 February
MKS Dąbrowa Górnicza	78
Arka Gdynia	81

Final
17 February
Arged BMSlam Stal	77
Arka Gdynia	74

== See also ==
- 2018–19 PLK season
