= Michał Gabiński =

Polish basketball player (born 1987)

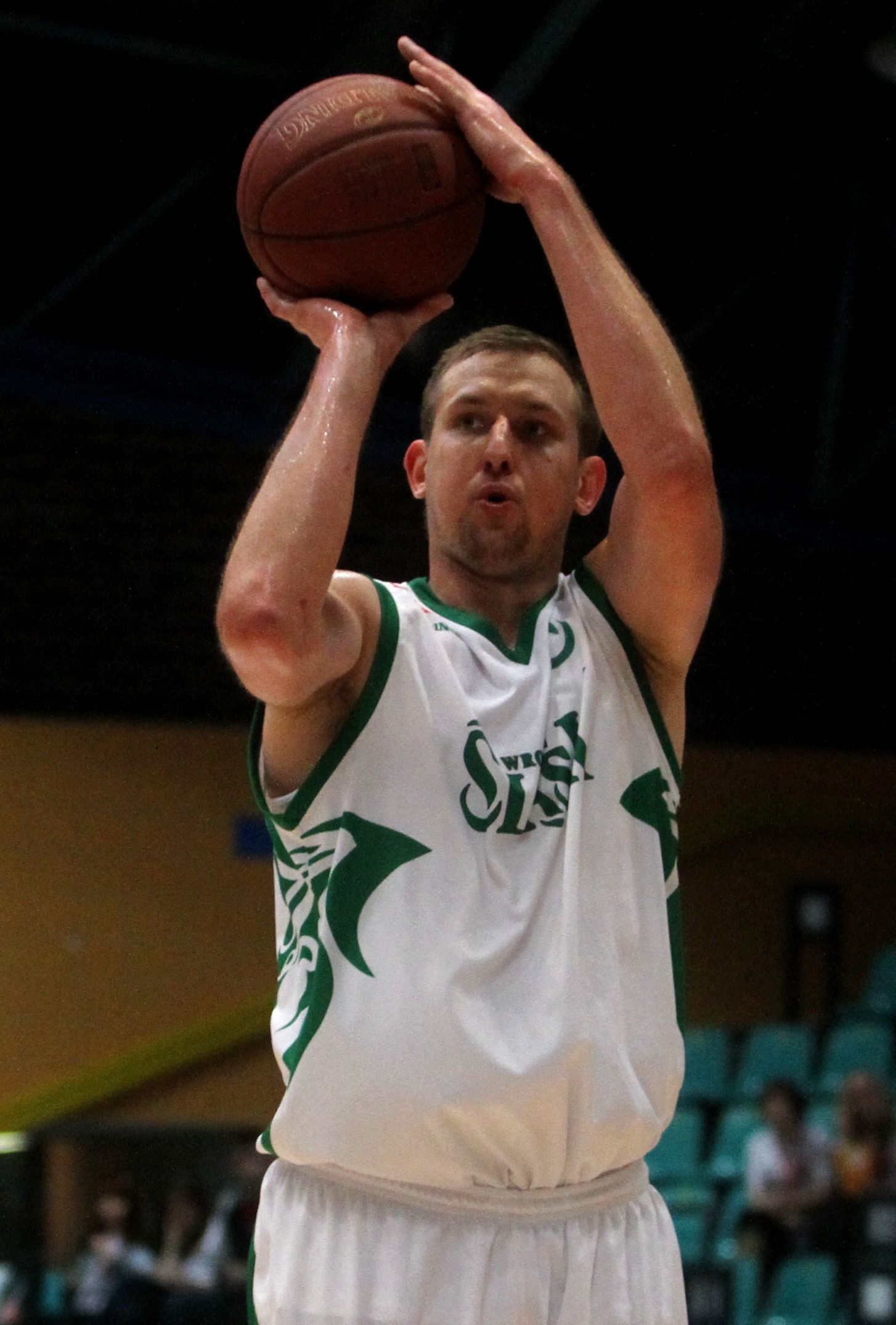
- Gabiński in 2014, for Śląsk Wrocław

No. 15 – Śląsk Wrocław
- Position: Power forward
- League: PLK

Personal information
- Born: February 11, 1987 (age 39) Stalowa Wola, Poland
- Listed height: 6 ft 7 in (2.01 m)

Career information
- Playing career: 2002–present

Career history
- 2002–2003: Stal Stalowa Wola
- 2003–2004: SMS PZKosz Kozienice
- 2004–2006: Anwil Włocławek
- 2006–2008: Sportino Inowrocław
- 2008–2009: Anwil Włocławek
- 2009–2010: Stal Stalowa Wola
- 2010–2012: PGE Turów Zgorzelec
- 2012–present: Śląsk Wrocław

Career highlights
- PLK champion (2022); Polish Cup winner (2014); Polish Cup MVP (2014)

Michał Gabiński (born February 11, 1987) is a Polish professional basketball player.

== Professional career ==
In his career, Gabiński has played with his hometown team, Stalowa Wola, as well as other Polish first division teams. Since 2012, he has been under contract with Śląsk Wrocław. In 2014, he was named the Polish Cup MVP.
