= Gabinski =

Gabinski or Gabiński is a surname. Notable people with the surname include:

- Michał Gabiński (born 1987), Polish basketball player
- Terry Gabinski (1938–2026), American politician
