= Dominik Tomczyk =

Polish basketball player (born 1974)

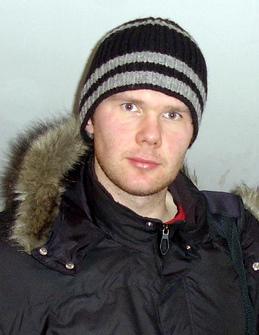

Personal information
- Born: April 15, 1974 (age 52) Wrocław, Poland
- Listed height: 2.04 m (6 ft 8 in)
- Listed weight: 100 kg (220 lb)

Career information
- Playing career: 1989–2008
- Position: Center

Career history
- 1990–1994: Gwardia Wrocław
- 1994–1997: Śląsk Wrocław
- 1997–2000: Znicz Pruszków
- 2000-2004: Śląsk Wrocław
- 2004–2005: Turów Zgorzelec
- 2005–2008: Śląsk Wrocław

Career highlights
- 2× Polish League MVP (1996, 2002); Polish League Finals MVP (1998)

Dominik Tomczyk (born April 15, 1974) is a Polish former professional basketball player. He is known as one of the all-time greats in Polish basketball. He was selected to the All-EuroBasket Team in 1997, as the Polish national team finished seventh.

== Honours ==
Club career

- 3× Polish Basketball League champion (1996, 2001, 2002)
- 2× Polish Cup (1989, 1990, 1992, 1997, 2004, 2005)

Individual awards

- 2× PLK Most Valuable Player (1996, 2002)
- Polish League Finals MVP (1998)
