= Jabarie Hinds =

American basketball player (born 1993)

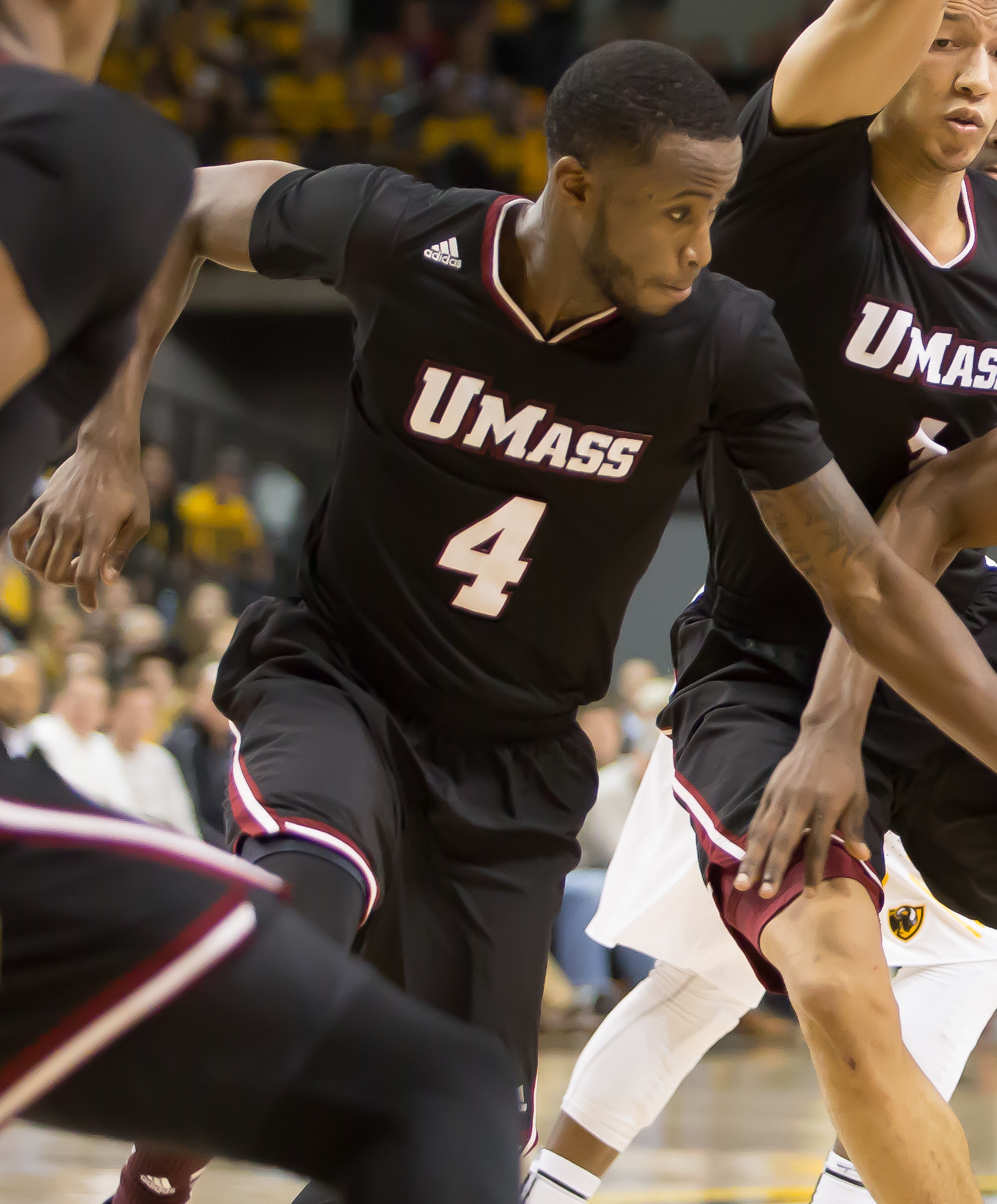
- Hinds playing for UMass in 2015

Personal information
- Born: March 11, 1993 (age 33)
- Listed height: 5 ft 11 in (1.80 m)
- Listed weight: 185 lb (84 kg)

Career information
- High school: Mount Vernon (Mount Vernon, New York)
- College: West Virginia (2011–2013); UMass (2014–2016)
- NBA draft: 2016: undrafted
- Playing career: 2016–present
- Position: Point guard

Career history
- 2016–2017: Prishtina
- 2017–2018: Atomerőmű SE
- 2018–2019: Krosno
- 2019–2020: MZT Skopje
- 2020: Socar Petkim
- 2020–2021: HydroTruck Radom
- 2021–2022: GTK Gliwice
- 2022–2023: Gezira
- 2023: Al Ahly Tripoli
- 2024–2025: BK Armex Decin

Career highlights
- 2x Polish League Top Scorer (2019, 2021); Kosovo Superleague champion (2017); Kosovo Cup winner (2017); Atlantic 10 Sixth Man of the Year (2016); Co-Mr. New York Basketball (2011)

Jabarie Wayne Hinds, Jr. (born March 11, 1993) is an American professional basketball player who last played for BK Armex Decin. He played college basketball for West Virginia and the UMass.

== Early life ==
Hinds was born in The Bronx and grew up in Mount Vernon, New York and attended Mount Vernon High School. He was a standout basketball player for the Knights and was named Mr. Basketball for Westchester County in his junior year after averaging 18.5 points, 4.5 steals and 4.0 assists. As a senior, Hinds averaged 17.7 points, 3.7 rebounds, 3.4 assists and 2.7 steals and was again named Mr. Basketball for Westchester County and also named co-Mr. Basketball for the state of New York and led the Knights to the New York Class AA state title, scoring 31 points in the championship game against Jamestown High School.

== College career ==
=== West Virginia ===
Hinds began his college career a West Virginia, where he was named a starter as a freshman. He averaged 7.4 points, led the Mountaineers with 3.3 assists, 1.4 steals and 2.5 rebounds per game over 33 starts in his first collegiate season as also led the team with 108 total assists and 46 steals. As a sophomore, Hinds started 26 of 32 games this past season and again averaged 7.4 points per game along with 1.8 rebounds and 1.6 assists per game as West Virginia went 13–19, the first losing season since Bob Huggins became head coach. He announced his intent to transfer following the season and was granted a release from his scholarship by the basketball program.

=== UMass ===
Hinds ultimately committed to transfer to the University of Massachusetts over Saint Joseph's and sat out one season due to NCAA transfer rules. As a redshirt junior, Hinds mostly came off the bench as a key reserve and averaged 8.1 points per game. He averaged 14.4 points, 2.3 rebounds, 3.0 assists, and a team-leading 1.5 steals per game in his final season of eligibility and was named the Atlantic 10 Conference co-Sixth Man of the Year.

== Professional career ==
=== Prishtina ===
Hinds signed with KB Prishtina of the Kosovo Basketball Superleague (FBK) on August 9, 2016. In his first professional season, Hinds averaged 12.1 points, 2.1 rebounds, 3.2 assists and 1.5 steals (3rd in the FBK) per game in 29 games played. He also averaged 14.9 points, 2.7 rebounds, 3.6 assists and 2.2 steals in 10 Balkan League games and 16.2 points, 3.3 rebounds, 6.0 assists and 2.2 steals in six FIBA Europe Cup contests.

=== Atomerőmű SE ===
Hinds signed with Atomerőmű SE of the Hungarian Nemzeti Bajnokság I/A (NB I/A) for the 2017–18 season. He averaged 15.9 points, 2.7 rebounds, 4.2 assists and 1.5 steals in 34 NB I/A games (32 starts) and was named honorable mention All-NB I/A by EuroBasket.com.

=== Krosno ===
Hinds signed with KKK MOSiR Krosno of the Polish Basketball League (PLK) on September 26, 2018. He started every game of the season for Krosno and led the PLK in scoring with 21.7 points per game while averaging 2.8 rebounds, 5.1 assists and 1.6 steals per game and was named honorable mention All-PLK by Eurobasket.com although the team finished last in the league with a 6–24 record.

=== MZT Skopje ===
Hinds signed with KK MZT Skopje of the Macedonian League on August 16, 2019. On March 3, 2020, his contract was terminated. Hinds averaged 11.0 points, 2.5 rebounds, 3.5 assists and 1.1 steals over 11 Macedonian League games and 13.9 points, 2.5 rebounds, 5.0 assists and 1.8 steals in 20 ABA League Second Division games.

=== Socar Petkim ===
Hinds signed with Socar Petkim of the Turkish Basketball First League (TBL) on March 8, 2020.

=== Radom ===
Hinds returned to the Polish Basketball League after signing with HydroTruck Radom on November 9, 2020.

=== GTK Gliwice ===
On July 13, 2021, he has signed with GTK Gliwice of the Polish Basketball League (PLK).

=== Gezira ===
On August 21, 2022, Hinds joined Gezira of the Egyptian Basketball Super League.
