= Dante Swanson =

American basketball player

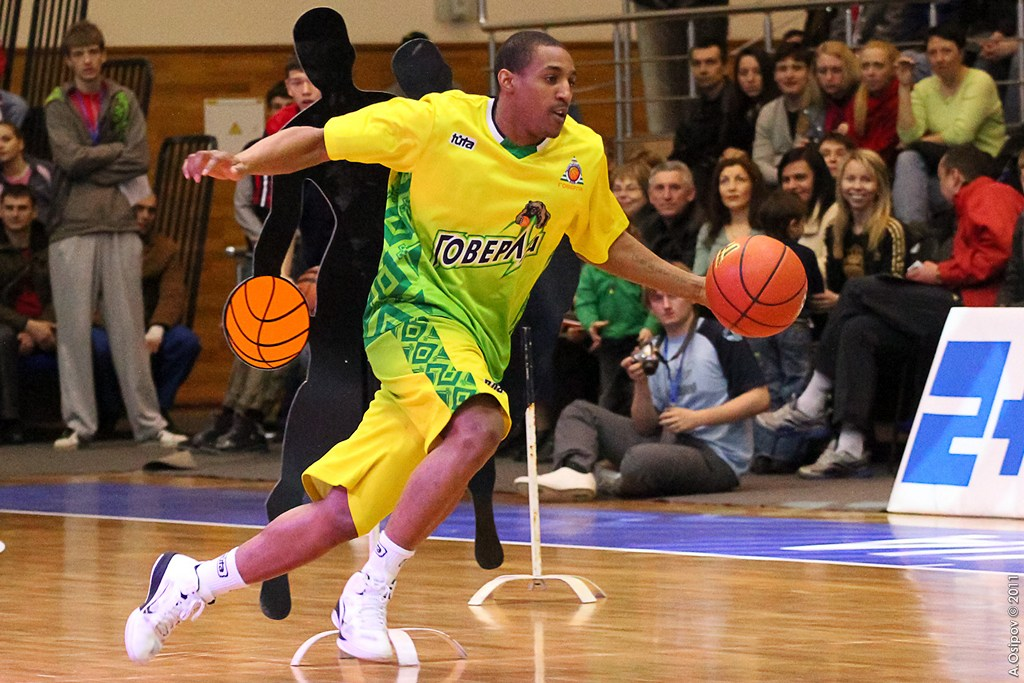

Personal information
- Born: January 23, 1981 (age 45) Wagoner, Oklahoma
- Listed height: 5 ft 10 in (1.78 m)
- Listed weight: 180 lb (82 kg)

Career information
- High school: Wagoner (Wagoner, Oklahoma)
- College: Tulsa (1999–2003)
- NBA draft: 2003: undrafted
- Playing career: 2003–2015
- Position: Point guard

Career history
- 2003–2004: Astoria Bydgoszcz
- 2004–2005: Anwil Włocławek
- 2005: Śląsk Wrocław
- 2005–2006: Anwil Włocławek
- 2007–2010: AZS Koszalin
- 2010–2012: Hoverla
- 2012–2013: Cherkaski Mavpy
- 2013–2014: Best Balıkesir
- 2014–2015: AZS Koszalin

Career highlights
- Polish Cup winner (2010); Polish Cup MVP (2010)

Dante Swanson (born January 23, 1981) is an American former professional basketball player.

He played college basketball for Tulsa from 1999 till 2003. With Tulsa, he was a NIT champion in 2001. In 2001 and 2002, he was named to the WAC All-Defensive Team.

In 2003, Swanson started his professional career. In 2007, he signed with AZS Koszalin, where he would stay three straight seasons. In 2009, he won the Polish Basketball Cup with Koszalin, and was named the competition's Most Valuable Player. In 2018 Swanson was elected to the Wagoner High School Athletics Hall of Fame.

== Honors ==
=== College ===
- National Invitation Tournament: 2001

Individual

- All-WAC Second Team: 2002
- WAC All-Defensive Team (2): 2001, 2002

=== Professional ===
- Polish Cup: 2010

Individual

- Polish Cup MVP: 2010

== Coaching career ==
Swanson was named the head coach of his alma mater Wagoner High School in March 2021. He went 12–13 in his first season leading the Bulldogs.
