= Jarosław Jechorek =

Polish basketball player (1961–2026)

Personal information
- Born: 31 May 1961 Poznań, Poland
- Died: 29 July 2026 (aged 65) Poznań, Poland
- Listed height: 208 cm (6 ft 10 in)

Career information
- Playing career: 1979–2001
- Position: Centre
- Number: 12

Career history
- 1979–1984: Lech Poznań
- 1984–1986: Śląsk Wrocław
- 1986–1992: Lech Poznań
- 1992–1993: Zastal Zielona Góra
- 1993–1995: JALT Le Mans
- 1995–1996: 10,5 Club Poznań
- 1996–1997: AZS Elana Toruń
- 1997–1998: Unia Tarnów
- 1998–1999: Black Jack Poznań
- 1999–2000: Zastal Zielona Góra
- 2000–2001: Alpen Gold Poznań

Career highlights
- Polish League Champion (1982–83, 1983–84, 1988–89, 1989–90); Polish League Silver Medalist (1981–82, 1990–91); Polish League Bronze Medalist (1984–85, 1985–86, 1986–87, 1987–88)

Career statistics
- National Team Caps: 171
- National Team Years: 1981–1991
- European Championships Participations: 5

Jarosław Jechorek (31 May 1961 – 29 July 2026) was a Polish basketball player known for his contributions to the Polish national team and notable performances in European club basketball with Lech Poznań.

== Playing career ==
=== National team ===
Jechorek earned a prominent role on the Poland national basketball team, where he played in 171 matches, including participation in 5 FIBA European Championships. His career with the national team spanned key tournaments and competitive periods in Polish basketball, where he was known for his skill and consistency on the court.

=== Club ===
Jechorek played primarily for Lech Poznań, one of Poland's leading basketball clubs in the 1980s, where he contributed to multiple Polish Championships. During his time with Lech Poznań, the team competed successfully in the Polish Basketball League and took part in European competitions, including the prestigious European Cup. His performance with the club helped cement his reputation in Polish basketball circles as a reliable and skilled player.

== Retirement and death ==
Following his retirement from professional basketball, Jechorek encountered a series of personal and legal challenges. He became involved in a fuel-related business, which later led to legal consequences. Jechorek served time in detention related to this involvement and received a suspended sentence and a fine. Reflecting on these experiences, he spoke openly about the complexities he faced in adapting to life after his sports career.

During this period, Jechorek also struggled with gambling, a challenge that he later worked to overcome with the support of Gamblers Anonymous. He credited his recovery to personal reflection and the encouragement of those close to him.

In later years, Jechorek faced further health issues, including a diagnosis of prostate cancer, which affected his ability to secure steady employment. He died on 29 July 2026, at the age of 65, after battling cancer for several years.

== Bibliography ==
- K. Łaszkiewicz (2004). Polska koszykówka męska 1928–2004 [Polish men's basketball 1928–2004]. Inowrocław: Wydawnictwo Pozkal. ISBN 83-89390-20-5. OCLC 749833294.
