= Maciej Zieliński (basketball) =

Polish basketball player (born 1971)

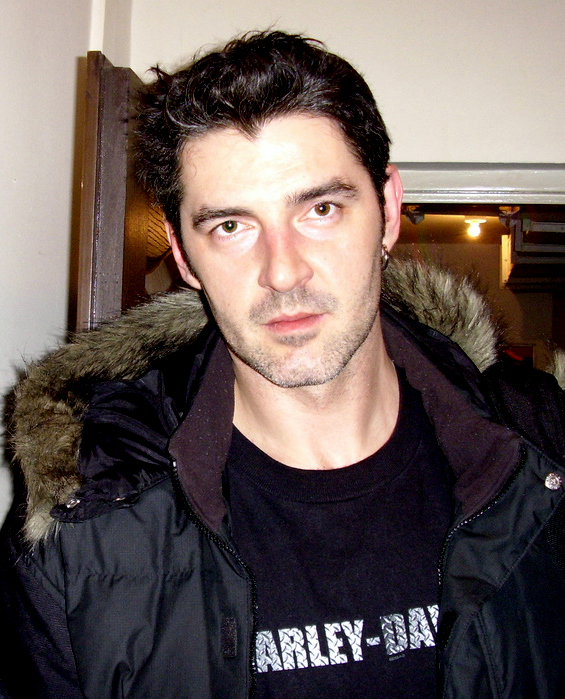

Personal information
- Born: 5 January 1971 (age 55) Wałbrzych, Poland
- Listed height: 1.98 m (6 ft 6 in)

Career information
- College: Providence (1992–1995)
- NBA draft: 1995: undrafted
- Playing career: 1986–2006
- Position: Shooting guard / small forward

Career history
- 1986–1987: AZS Olsztyn
- 1987–1992 1995–2006: Śląsk Wrocław

Career highlights
- 8× Polish League champion (1991, 1992, 1996, 1998–2002); 5× Polish Cup (1989, 1990, 1992, 1997, 2004, 2005); 3× Polish League MVP (1992, 1997, 1999); Polish League Finals MVP (1999)

Maciej Zieliński (born 5 January 1971) is a Polish former professional basketball player. He is known as one of the all-time greats in Polish basketball. He studied in the United States at Providence College. With the national team he participated at EuroBasket 1991 and EuroBasket 1997, as the Polish national team finished seventh in both tournaments. He played vast majority of his professional career with Śląsk Wrocław, where he became a multiple Polish champion and the Polish Basketball League Most Valuable Player.

After retiring from basketball, Zieliński went into politics, serving as a member of the Sejm in 2011, and that same year was named president of the Śląsk Wrocław basketball team.

== Honours ==
Club career

- 8× Polish Basketball League champion (1991, 1992, 1996, 1998, 1999, 2000, 2001, 2002)
- 5× Polish Cup (1989, 1990, 1992, 1997, 2004, 2005)

Individual awards

- 3× PLK Most Valuable Player (1992, 1997, 1999)
- Polish League Finals MVP (1999)
