= Wilki Morskie Szczecin =

- Nickname: Sea Wolves
- Leagues: PLK; Europe Cup
- Founded: 2004; 22 years ago
- History: Wilki Morskie Szczecin (2004–present)
- Arena: Arena Szczecin
- Capacity: 7,403
- Location: Szczecin, Poland
- Team colors: Blue, White, Red
- President: Krzysztof Król
- Team manager: Zbigniew Kołodziejczyk
- Head coach: Maciej Majcherek
- Team captain: Tomasz Gielo
- Ownership: Krzysztof Król
- Championships: 1 Polish Championship
- Website: www.kingwilki.pl
Home	Away

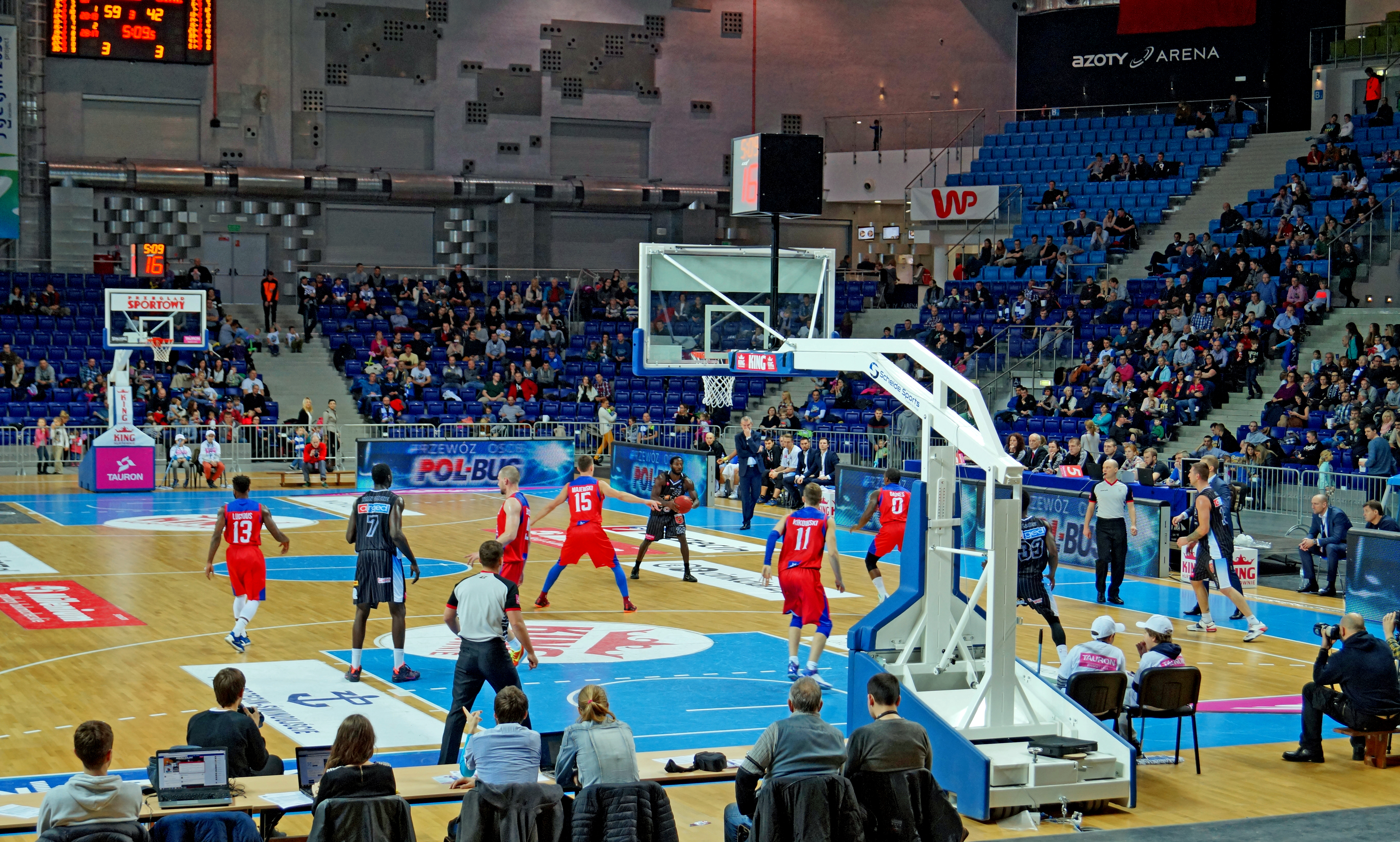
A home game of Wilki Morskie in Arena Szczecin

The King Wilki Morskie Szczecin is a Polish professional basketball team based in Szczecin, West Pomeranian. King Szczecin competes in the Polska Liga Koszykówki (PLK), the top tier league in Poland.

The club was founded in 2004 and made its debut in the PLK in 2014. Nine years later, they won their first-ever national championship after they defeated Śląsk Wrocław to win the 2023 title.

== Season by season ==
Season	Tier	League	Pos.	Polish Cup
2014–15	2	I Liga	4th (Note: Received a wild card to promote to the PLK.)	
2015–16	1	PLK	6th	
2016–17	1	PLK	11th	Quarterfinalist
2017–18	1	PLK	7th	
2018–19	1	PLK	7th	
2019–20	1	PLK	8th	
2020–21	1	PLK	7th	
2021–22	1	PLK	8th	Semifinalist
2022–23	1	PLK	1st	Quarterfinalist
2023–24	1	PLK	2nd	Quarterfinalist
2024–25	1	PLK	7th	Runner-up
2025–26	1	PLK	5th	Quarterfinalist

== Players ==
=== Current roster ===
Note: Flags indicate national team eligibility at FIBA-sanctioned events. Players may hold other non-FIBA nationalities not displayed.

Wilki Morskie Szczecin roster
Players
Coaches

Pos.	No.	Nat.	Name
G/F	0	(United States)	Porter, Zahir	1.98 m (6 ft 6 in)	26 – 11 January 2000
PG	2	(Poland)	Majcherek, Antoni	1.88 m (6 ft 2 in)	17 – 1 May 2009
F/C	6	(Poland)	Woźniak, Filip	2.05 m (6 ft 9 in)	19 – 6 May 2007
F/C	11	(France)	Chassang, Alexandre	2.05 m (6 ft 9 in)	31 – 22 November 1994
PF	12	(Poland)	Gielo, Tomasz (C)	2.05 m (6 ft 9 in)	33 – 4 January 1993
SF	14	(Poland)	Egner, Maximillian	2.02 m (6 ft 8 in)	24 – 25 July 2002
C	15	(Poland)	Witliński, Mikołaj	2.08 m (6 ft 10 in)	30 – 2 December 1995
PG	19	(Czech Republic)	Sehnal, Ondřej	1.91 m (6 ft 3 in)	29 – 10 October 1997
G	21	(United States)	Reynolds, Noah	1.91 m (6 ft 3 in)	24 – 11 November 2002
F	22	(United States)	McCaffery, Patrick	2.06 m (6 ft 9 in)	26 – 20 March 2000
SG	27	(Poland)	Ucieszyński, Jakub	1.95 m (6 ft 5 in)	21 – 9 June 2005
G/F	28	(Poland)	Żołnierewicz, Przemysław	1.96 m (6 ft 5 in)	31 – 3 July 1995
PF	31	(Poland)	Kostrzewski, Mateusz	2.02 m (6 ft 8 in)	37 – 18 September 1989

Head coach

- (Poland) Maciej Majcherek

Assistant coach(es)

- (Sweden) Carl Engström

Legend

- (C) Team captain
- Injured

- Roster
Updated: October 4, 2026

=== Depth chart ===
Pos.	Starting 5	Bench 1	Bench 2
C	Nemanja Popović
PF	Tomasz Gielo	Maximilian Egner
SF	Jovan Novak	Mateusz Kostrzewski	Jakub Ucieszyński
SG	Noah Freidel	Przemysław Żołnierewicz
PG	Anthony Roberts	Jeremy Roach	Antoni Majcherek

=== Notable players ===
Note: Flags indicate national team eligibility at FIBA-sanctioned events. Players may hold other non-FIBA nationalities not displayed.

Criteria

To appear in this section a player must have either:

- Set a club record or won an individual award while at the club
- Played at least one official international match for their national team at any time
- Played at least one official NBA match at any time.

- (Serbia) Jovan Novak
- (United States) Bryce Brown
- (United States) Michale Kyser
- (United States) Isaiah Whitehead

== Achievements ==
- Polish League (1):
  - Winner (1): 2022–23
  - Runners-up (1): 2023–24
- Polish Cup:
  - Runners-up (1): 2025
