= 2004–05 Polish Basketball League =

The 2004–05 Polish Basketball League was the 77th edition of the top basketball league of Poland and the second and final season branded as the Era Basket Liga under a sponsorship agreement with Polska Telefonia Cyfrowa, operator of the Era mobile network. The regular season opened on 16 October 2004 with Prokom Trefl Sopot finishing first at 19–3 and going on to win the championship, defeating Anwil Włocławek 4–2 in a best-of-seven final that concluded on 1 June 2005.

== Teams ==
The first 10 teams will play in Era Basket Liga in the next season:

- Idea Śląsk Wrocław
- Prokom Trefl Sopot
- Anwil Włocławek
- Polonia Warbud Warszawa
- Gipsar Stal Ostrów Wlkp.
- Unia Wisła Paged Tarnów
- Arcus Detal-Met Notec Inowrocław
- Czarni Słupsk
- Ostromecko Astoria Bydgoszcz
- AZS Gaz Ziemny Koszalin

Last 2 teams are dropped from EBL

- Start Lublin
- Spojnia Stargard Szczeciński

Teams promoted to EBL

- Turów Zgorzelec
- SKS Starogard Gdański

== League table ==
Pos	Team	Pld	W	L	PF	PA	PD	Pts
1	Prokom Trefl Sopot	22	19	3	1903	1605	+298	41
2	Anwil Włocławek	22	17	5	1727	1562	+165	39
3	Polonia Warszawa	22	14	8	1930	1725	+205	36
4	Turów Zgorzelec	22	13	9	1798	1719	+79	35
5	Astoria Bydgoszcz	22	12	10	1777	1841	−64	34
6	Platinum Wisła Kraków	22	12	10	1740	1823	−83	34
7	Deichmann Śląsk Wrocław	22	10	12	1744	1731	+13	32
8	Polpharma Starogard Gdański	22	9	13	1705	1730	−25	31
9	Czarni Słupsk	22	8	14	1649	1729	−80	30
10	Noteć Inowrocław	22	7	15	1705	1891	−186	29
11	AZS Koszalin	22	6	16	1915	2034	−119	28
12	Gipsar Stal Ostrów Wielkopolski	22	5	17	1692	1895	−203	27

== Ineligible for playoffs ==
Pos	Team	Pld	W	L	PF	PA	PD	Pts
9	Czarni Słupsk	28	11	17	2134	2209	−75	39
10	AZS Koszalin	28	10	18	2449	2526	−77	38
11	Noteć Inowrocław	28	9	19	2185	2405	−220	37
12	Gipsar Stal Ostrów Wielkopolski	28	8	20	2188	2404	−216	36

== Playoffs ==
QUARTERFINALS
- Prokom 3
  - 94:83
  - 88:71
  - 97:77
- Polpharma 0

- Turów Zgorzelec 3
  - 102:64
  - 94:75
  - 93:85
- Astoria 0

- Anwil Włocławek 3
  - 76:74
  - 86:84
  - 72:90
  - 101:84
- Deichmann Śląsk 1

- Polonia 3
  - 92:83
  - 77:62
  - 96:88
- Unia Tarnów 0
SEMIFINALS
- Prokom 4
  - 84:67
  - 88:78
  - 83:75
  - 80:88
  - 80:67
  - Turów Zgorzelec 1

- Anwil Włocławek 4
  - 90:75
  - 85:83
  - 73:96
  - 79:73
  - 74:68
- Polonia 1
FINAL
o mistrzostwo
- Prokom 4
  - 75:72
  - 75:85
  - 74:41
  - 57:77
  - 77:63
  - 72:67
- Anwil Włocławek 2

o 3 miejsce

- Polonia 2
  - 83:75
  - 80:88
  - 91:72
- Turów Zgorzelec 1

== Awards ==
Goran Jagodnik of Prokom Trefl Sopot was named Era Basket Liga Player of the Year, and Andrej Urlep of Anwil Włocławek was named Coach of the Year. The regular-season scoring leaders were Michael Ansley of Platinum Wisła Kraków at 23.1 points per game, Tarrence Hill of Polonia Warszawa at 20.9, and Jagodnik at 19.3.

== All-Star Game ==
The Era Basket Liga All-Star Game was held on 29 January 2005 at Hala Znicz in Pruszków and broadcast live on TVP3. Goran Jagodnik received the highest number of fan votes (11,985), and Gintaras Kadziulis of Anwil Włocławek was named All-Star MVP.
