= Edward Jurkiewicz =

Polish basketball player (born 1948)

Personal information
- Born: 22 January 1948 (age 78) Pruszcz Gdański, Poland
- Listed height: 1.95 m (6 ft 5 in)
- Listed weight: 90 kg (198 lb)

Career information
- Playing career: 1964–1979
- Position: Small forward

Career history
- 1964–1967: AZS Gdańsk
- 1967–1968: Zawisza Bydgoszcz
- 1968–1969: Legia Warszawa
- 1969–1979: Wybrzeże Gdańsk

Career highlights
- As player: FIBA European Olympic Qualifying Tournament Top Scorer (1976); FIBA European Selection (1971); FIBA EuroBasket Top Scorer (1971); 5× Polish Premier League champion (1969, 1971–1973, 1978); 4× Polish Cup winner (1968, 1976, 1978, 1979); 3× Polish Premier League Player of the Year (1971, 1976, 1977); 8× Polish Premier League Top Scorer (1970–1972, 1974–1978); All-Polish Premier League Team (1979)

Edward Jurkiewicz (born 22 January 1948 in Pruszcz Gdański, Poland) is a Polish former professional basketball player and coach. During his playing career, he was a 1.95 m tall (6' 4 3/4") tall small forward. Jurkiewicz is considered to be one of the greatest scorers in European basketball history. Jurkiewicz, who was the Polish Premier League's Top Scorer eight times, and was named to the FIBA European Selection Team in 1971; is the all-time leading scorer in the entire history of the Polish Premier League, from 1947 to the present day.

Jurkiewicz is also the all-time leading scorer in the history of the senior Polish national team. While representing Poland, he was twice named to the FIBA EuroBasket's All-Tournament team, in the 1969 edition and the 1971 edition of the tournament. He was also the Top Scorer of the 1971 edition of the EuroBasket, and the Top Scorer of the 1976 FIBA European Olympic Qualifying Tournament.

== Professional career ==
Jurkiewicz won five Polish Premier League championships, in the years 1969, 1971, 1972, 1973, and 1978. In addition to that, he also won four Polish Cup titles, in the years 1968, 1976, 1978, and 1979. He was named the Polish Premier League Player of the Year, a total of three times, in the years 1971, 1976, and 1977.

Jurkiewicz was also the Polish Premier League Top Scorer a record eight times, as he led the Polish Premier League in scoring in the years 1970, 1971, 1972, 1974, 1975, 1976, 1977, and 1978. His personal single-game scoring high in the Polish Premier league was 84 points scored, which is the second most points ever scored in a single game in the league's history. The 84 point game came in a match against Baildon Katowice, on 15 March 1970.

Jurkiewicz had a total of 16 games in Poland's Premier League, in which he scored at least 50 points. In the 1976–77 Polish Premier League season, he averaged 38.2 points per game, which is still a Polish Premier League single-season record. As is the total amount of points that he scored that season (1,717).

On the European-wide level, Jurkiewicz was a member of the FIBA European Selection Team in 1971. After he played in Poland, he moved to France to play. He once scored 94 points in a single game of the French 2nd Division.

Overall, Jurkiewicz scored a total of 23,726 points in the Polish Premier League, which is the record for the most points scored in the overall history of the league, from 1947 to the present. During his entire professional club career in Poland and France, he scored a total of 36,478 points.

== National team career ==
Jurkiewicz was a member of the senior men's Polish national team. He competed with Poland at the 1968 Pre-Olympic Tournament, and also in the men's tournament at the 1968 Mexico City Summer Olympics. Poland finished that tournament in sixth place.

Jurkiewicz was named to the 1969 FIBA EuroBasket's All-Tournament Team. He also led the 1971 FIBA EuroBasket in scoring, averaging 22.6 points per game. His performance at that tournament earned him another selection to the All-Tournament Team. He also represented Poland at the 1975 FIBA EuroBasket, and the 1976 FIBA European Olympic Qualifying Tournament, which he led in scoring.

In total, Jurkiewicz had a total of 203 caps with the senior Polish national team, from 1968 to 1977. In those 203 games, he scored a total of 4,114 points, for a career scoring average of 20.3 points per game. He is the senior Polish national team's all-time leading scorer.

== Coaching career ==
After Jurkiewicz retired from his club playing career, he became a basketball coach. He worked as a coach in France.
