= Leszek Doliński =

Polish basketball player (born 1956)

Personal information
- Nationality: Polish
- Born: 29 June 1956 (age 70) Koszalin, Poland

Sport
- Sport: Basketball

Leszek Doliński (born 29 June 1956) is a Polish former basketball player. He competed in the men's tournament at the 1980 Summer Olympics.
