= Polish Basketball League =

Professional men's club basketball league in Poland

- Founded: 1995; 31 years ago
- First season: 1995–96
- Country: Poland
- Federation: PZKosz
- Confederation: FIBA Europe
- Number of teams: 16
- Level on pyramid: 1
- Relegation to: I Liga
- Domestic cup: Polish Cup
- Supercup: Polish Supercup
- International cup(s): Eurocup Basketball; Champions League; FIBA Europe Cup
- Current champions: Legia Warsaw (9th title) (2025–26)
- Most championships: Śląsk Wrocław (18 titles)
- All-time top scorer: Eugeniusz Kijewski (10,185)
- TV partners: Polsat Sport
- Website: plk.pl
- 2026–27 PLK season

Polska Liga Koszykówki (PLK) (English: Polish Basketball League), officially known as the Orlen Basket Liga due to its sponsorship by Orlen, is a professional men's club basketball league in Poland. It constitutes the first and highest-tier level of the Polish league pyramid. The winning team of the final round are crowned the Polish Champions of that season. It began in 1947–48, with the name of I Liga, and was originally organized by the Polish Basketball Federation. The league changed to its current form, beginning with the 1997–98 season, after the Polska Liga Koszykówki SA, PLK SA (the Polish Basketball League Joint-stock company) took control over the league (the PLK SA was created in 1995). In the 2000–01 season, the league turned professional.

The PLK, which is played under FIBA rules, currently consists of 16 teams. A PLK season is split into a league stage and a playoffs stage (since 1984–85 season). At the end of the league stage, the top eight teams qualify for the playoff stage.

The competition Polish basketball men's championships has existed since the year 1928. Śląsk Wrocław is the record holder for most titles, with 18.

Legia Warsaw are the defending champions.

== Naming and logos ==
Due to sponsorship reasons, the league has been known under several names:

- 1997–1999: Polska Liga Koszykówki (PLK)
- 1999–2001: Lech Basket Liga (LBL)
- 2001–2003: Polska Liga Koszykówki (PLK)
- 2003–2005: Era Basket Liga (EBL)
- 2005–2006: Dominet Basket Liga (DBL)
- 2006–2008: Dominet Bank Ekstraliga (DBE)
- 2008–2010: Polska Liga Koszykówki (PLK)
- 2010–2016: Tauron Basket Liga (TBL)
- 2016–2018: Polska Liga Koszykówki (PLK)
- 2018–2023: Energa Basket Liga
- 2023–present: Orlen Basket Liga (OBL)
PLK original logo (2008–2010, 2016–2018)

Logo used from 2018 to 2023

== Teams ==
Team	Location	Arena	Capacity
Anwil Włocławek	Włocławek	Hala Mistrzów	4,200
Arka Gdynia	Gdynia	Gdynia Sports Arena	5,500
Śląsk Wrocław	Wrocław	Hala Orbita	3,000
Stal Ostrów Wielkopolski	Ostrów Wielkopolski	Arena Ostrów	5,000
GTK Gliwice	Gliwice	Centrum Sportowo-Kulturalne Łabędź / Gliwice Arena	400 / 15,000
Górnik Wałbrzych	Wałbrzych	Aqua Zdrój	1,200
Legia Warsaw	Warsaw	OSiR Bemowo	1,000
Astoria Bydgoszcz	Bydgoszcz	Sisu Arena	1,470
MKS Dąbrowa Górnicza	Dąbrowa Górnicza	Centrum Hall	2,944
Czarni Słupsk	Słupsk	Hala Gryfia	2,500
Twarde Pierniki Toruń	Toruń	Arena Toruń	6,248
Zastal Zielona Góra	Zielona Góra	CRS Hall Zielona Góra	6,080
Start Lublin	Lublin	Globus Hall	5,000
Dziki Warsaw	Warsaw	Hala Koło	1,298
Trefl Sopot	Sopot	Ergo Arena / Hala Stulecia Sopot	15,000 / 1,000
Wilki Morskie Szczecin	Szczecin	Netto Arena	7,403

== Medalists ==
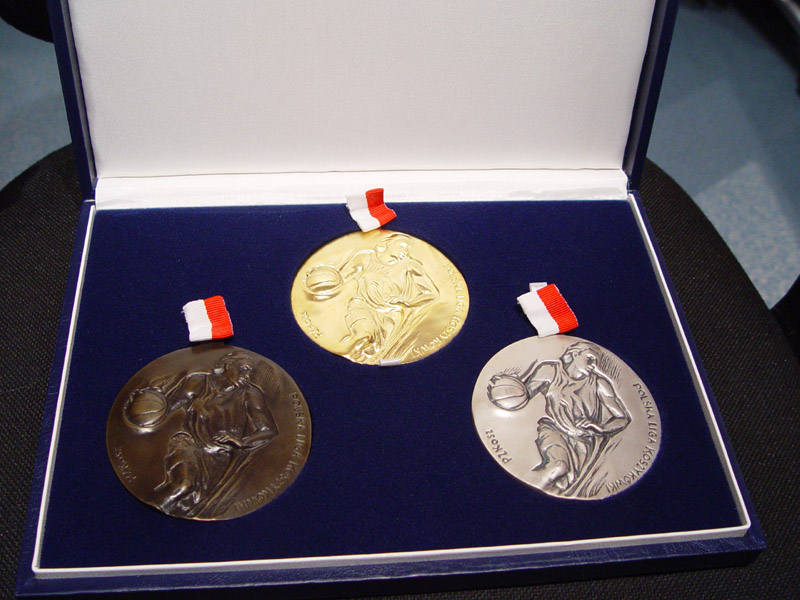
The official PLK medals

Season	Champion	Score	Runner-up	Third place
1997–98	Śląsk Wrocław (13)	4–3	Znicz Pruszków	Bobry Bytom
1998–99	Śląsk Wrocław (14)	4–3	KK Włocławek	Bobry Bytom
1999–00	Śląsk Wrocław (15)	4–1	Anwil Włocławek	Znicz Pruszków
2000–01	Śląsk Wrocław (16)	4–1	Anwil Włocławek	Trefl Sopot
2001–02	Śląsk Wrocław (17)	4–1	Trefl Sopot	Stal Ostrów Wielkopolski
2002–03	Włocławek (1)	4–2	Trefl Sopot	Śląsk Wrocław
2003–04	Trefl Sopot (1)	4–1	Śląsk Wrocław	Polonia Warszawa
2004–05	Trefl Sopot (2)	4–2	Włocławek	Polonia Warszawa
2005–06	Trefl Sopot (3)	4–1	Włocławek	Czarni Słupsk
2006–07	Trefl Sopot (4)	4–1	Turów Zgorzelec	Śląsk Wrocław
2007–08	Trefl Sopot (5)	4–3	Turów Zgorzelec	Śląsk Wrocław
2008–09	Trefl Sopot (6)	4–1	Turów Zgorzelec	Anwil Włocławek
2009–10	Gdynia (7)	4–0	Włocławek	SKS Starogard Gdański
2010–11	Gdynia (8)	4–3	Turów Zgorzelec	Czarni Słupsk
2011–12	Gdynia (9)	4–3	Trefl Sopot	Zastal Zielona Góra
2012–13	Zastal Zielona Góra (1)	4–0	Turów Zgorzelec	AZS Koszalin
2013–14	Turów Zgorzelec (1)	4–2	Zastal Zielona Góra	Trefl Sopot
2014–15	Zastal Zielona Góra (2)	4–2	Turów Zgorzelec	Czarni Słupsk
2015–16	Zastal Zielona Góra (3)	4–0	Rosa Radom	Czarni Słupsk
2016–17	Zastal Zielona Góra (4)	4–1	Toruń	Stal Ostrów Wielkopolski
2017–18	Włocławek (2)	4–2	Stal Ostrów Wielkopolski	Toruń
2018–19	Anwil Włocławek (3)	4–3	Toruń	Arka Gdynia
2019–20 (Note: The 2019–20 PLK season was curtailed due to the COVID-19 pandemic. Standings at the time were declared final results.)	Zielona Góra (5)	—N/a	Start Lublin	Anwil Włocławek
2020–21	Stal Ostrów Wielkopolski (1)	4–2	Zastal Zielona Góra	WKS Śląsk Wrocław
2021–22	Śląsk Wrocław (18)	4–1	Legia Warszawa	Anwil Włocławek
2022–23	King Szczecin (1)	4–2	Śląsk Wrocław	Anwil Włocławek
2023–24	Trefl Sopot (1)	4–3	King Szczecin	WKS Śląsk Wrocław
2024–25	Legia Warsaw (8)	4–3	Start Lublin	Trefl Sopot
2025–26	Legia Warsaw (9)	4–3	Zastal Zielona Góra	Dziki Warsaw

== Records and statistics ==
=== Individual records ===
The all-time scoring leaders of Poland's top-tier level men's pro club basketball competition, since the year 1947, when the competition began. From 1947 to 1975, official records of individual player statistics were not kept. The Polish Basketball Association officially began to keep the records of individual player statistics in 1976.

==== All-time scoring leaders (1947–present) ====
Pos	Player	Total Points Scored
1.	Edward Jurkiewicz	23,126

==== All-time scoring leaders (1976–present) ====
The all-time scoring leaders of Poland's top-tier level men's pro club basketball competition, since the year 1976, when the Polish Basketball Association officially began to keep the records of individual player statistics.

Pos	Player	Total Points Scored	Games Played
1.	Eugeniusz Kijewski	10,185	395
2.	Adam Wójcik	10,097	651
3.	Edward Jurkiewicz	9,832	306
4.	Jerzy Bińkowski	9,204	586
5.	Mieczysław Młynarski	9,026	357
6.	Mariusz Bacik	8,706	627
7.	Maciej Zieliński	8,650	579
8.	Andrzej Pluta	8,512	591
9.	Henryk Wardach	8,163	557
10.	Dominik Tomczyk	8,008	556
11.	Jarosław Jechorek	7,681	489
12.	Dariusz Zelig	7,481	420
13.	Eugeniusz Durejko	7,048	365
14.	Jarosław Marcinkowski	6,979	499
15.	Jarosław Zyskowski	6,774	484

==== Single game scoring highs ====
1. (Poland) Mieczysław Młynarski: 90 points (1982–83 season: Górnik Wałbrzych versus Pogoń Szczecin: 10 December 1982)
2. (Poland) Edward Jurkiewicz: 84 points (1969–70 season: Wybrzeże Gdańsk versus Baildon Katowice: March 15 March 1970)
3. (Poland) Mieczysław Łopatka: 77 points (1962–63 season: Śląsk Wrocław versus AZS Gdańsk)
4. (Poland) Leszek Doliński: 74 points (1988–89 season: Gwardia Wrocław versus AZS Koszalin)
5. (Poland) Edward Jurkiewicz: 67 points (1974–75 season: Górnik Wałbrzych versus Wybrzeże Gdańsk: 9 October 1974)
6. (Poland) Mieczysław Młynarski: 63 points (1982–83 season: Górnik Wałbrzych versus Pogoń Szczecin)

=== Team records ===
- Highest attendance in a single game:

10,152 – Trefl Sopot vs Asseco Prokom Gdynia, at Ergo Arena on 14 April 2012

== Individual awards ==
After the end of each season, individual honors are given to the best performing players of a season. A select group of press members vote for the winners of individual awards.

- Most Valuable Player
- Finals MVP
- Top Scorer
- Best Defender
- Rookie of the Year (defunct)
- Best Coach
- All-PLK Team
- Best Young Player

== List of Polish basketball champions ==
- 1928: Czarna Trzynastka Poznań
- 1929: Cracovia
- 1930: AZS Poznań
- 1931: AZS Poznań
- 1932: AZS Poznań
- 1933: YMCA Kraków
- 1934: YMCA Kraków
- 1935: KPW Poznań
- 1936: Not played due to the 1936 Summer Olympics.
- 1937: AZS Poznań
- 1938: Cracovia
- 1939: KPW Poznań
- 1940: Not played due to World War II.
- 1941: Not played due to World War II.
- 1942: Not played due to World War II.
- 1943: Not played due to World War II.
- 1944: Not played due to World War II.
- 1945: Not played due to World War II.
- 1946: KKS Poznań
- 1947: AZS Warszawa
- 1948: YMCA Łódź
- 1949: ZZK Poznań
- 1950: Spójnia Łódź
- 1951: Kolejarz Poznań
- 1952: Spójnia Łódź
- 1953: Włókniarz Łódź
- 1954: Gwardia Kraków
- 1955: Kolejarz Poznań
- 1956: CWKS Warszawa
- 1957: Legia Warszawa
- 1958: Lech Poznań
- 1959: Polonia Warszawa
- 1960: Legia Warszawa
- 1961: Legia Warszawa
- 1962: Wisła Kraków
- 1963: Legia Warszawa
- 1964: Wisła Kraków
- 1965: Śląsk Wrocław
- 1966: Legia Warszawa
- 1967: AZS Warszawa
- 1968: Wisła Kraków
- 1969: Legia Warszawa
- 1970: Śląsk Wrocław
- 1971: Wybrzeże Gdańsk
- 1972: Wybrzeże Gdańsk
- 1973: Wybrzeże Gdańsk
- 1974: Wisła Kraków
- 1975: Resovia Rzeszów
- 1976: Wisła Kraków
- 1977: Śląsk Wrocław
- 1978: Wybrzeże Gdańsk
- 1979: Śląsk Wrocław
- 1980: Śląsk Wrocław
- 1981: Śląsk Wrocław
- 1982: Górnik Wałbrzych
- 1983: Lech Poznań
- 1984: Lech Poznań
- 1985: Zagłębie Sosnowiec
- 1986: Zagłębie Sosnowiec
- 1987: Śląsk Wrocław
- 1988: Górnik Wałbrzych
- 1989: Lech Poznań
- 1990: Lech Poznań
- 1991: Śląsk Wrocław
- 1992: PCS Śląsk Wrocław
- 1993: PCS Śląsk Wrocław
- 1994: Śląsk Wrocław
- 1995: Mazowszanka Pruszków
- 1996: Śląsk Eska Wrocław
- 1997: Mazowszanka PEKAES Pruszków
- 1998: Zepter Śląsk Wrocław
- 1999: Zepter Śląsk Wrocław
- 2000: Zepter Śląsk Wrocław
- 2001: Zepter Śląsk Wrocław
- 2002: Idea Śląsk Wrocław
- 2003: Anwil Włocławek
- 2004: Prokom Trefl Sopot
- 2005: Prokom Trefl Sopot
- 2006: Prokom Trefl Sopot
- 2007: Prokom Trefl Sopot
- 2008: Prokom Trefl Sopot
- 2009: Asseco Prokom Sopot
- 2010: Asseco Prokom Gdynia
- 2011: Asseco Prokom Gdynia
- 2012: Asseco Prokom Gdynia
- 2013: Stelmet Zielona Góra
- 2014: PGE Turów Zgorzelec
- 2015: Stelmet Zielona Góra
- 2016: Stelmet Zielona Góra
- 2017: Stelmet Zielona Góra
- 2018: Anwil Włocławek
- 2019: Anwil Włocławek
- 2020: Stelmet Enea BC Zielona Góra
- 2021: Arged BM Slam Stal Ostrów Wielkopolski
- 2022: Śląsk Wrocław
- 2023: King Szczecin
- 2024: Trefl Sopot
- 2025: Legia Warsaw
- 2026: Legia Warsaw

=== Titles by club ===
Club	Champions	Winning years
Śląsk Wrocław	18	1965, 1970, 1977, 1979, 1980, 1981, 1987, 1991, 1992, 1993, 1994, 1996, 1998, 1999, 2000, 2001, 2002, 2022
Lech Poznań	11	1935, 1939, 1946, 1949, 1951, 1955, 1958, 1983, 1984, 1989, 1990
Arka Gdynia	9	2004, 2005, 2006, 2007, 2008, 2009, 2010, 2011, 2012
Legia Warsaw	9	1956, 1957, 1960, 1961, 1963, 1966, 1969, 2025, 2026
Wisła Kraków	6	1954, 1962, 1964, 1968, 1974, 1976
Zastal Zielona Góra	5	2013, 2015, 2016, 2017, 2020
AZS Poznań	4	1930, 1931, 1932, 1937
Wybrzeże Gdańsk	4	1971, 1972, 1973, 1978
KK Włocławek	3	2003, 2018, 2019
YMCA Kraków	2	1933, 1934
Cracovia	2	1929, 1938
Społem Łódź	2	1950, 1952
AZS Warsaw	2	1947, 1967
Zagłębie Sosnowiec	2	1985, 1986
Górnik Wałbrzych	2	1982, 1988
MKS Znicz Basket Pruszków	2	1995, 1997
Czarna Trzynastka Poznań	1	1928
YMCA Łódź	1	1948
ŁKS Łódź	1	1953
Polonia Warsaw	1	1959
Resovia	1	1975
Turów Zgorzelec	1	2014
Stal Ostrów Wielkopolski	1	2021
Wilki Morskie Szczecin	1	2023
Trefl Sopot	1	2024

== See also ==
- Basketball in Poland
- Polish basketball league system
- Polish Basketball All-Star Game
- I Liga (basketball)
- Basket Liga Kobiet
- Polish Basketball Cup
- Polish Basketball Supercup
- Polish Basketball Federation
