= Arka Gdynia (basketball) =

Polish basketball team

AMW Arka Gdynia
- Leagues: PLK
- Founded: 1995; 31 years ago
- History: Trefl Sopot (1995–1998); Prokom Trefl Sopot (1998–2008); Asseco Prokom Sopot (2008–2009); Asseco Prokom Gdynia (2009–2013); Asseco Gdynia (2013–2018); Arka Gdynia (2018–present)
- Arena: Gdynia Sports Arena
- Capacity: 5,500
- Location: Gdynia, Poland
- Team colors: Yellow and Blue
- President: Przemysław Sęczkowski
- Head coach: Mantas Česnauskis
- Team captain: Kamil Łączyński
- Championships: 9 Polish Championships; 4 Polish Cups; 2 Polish SuperCups
- Website: www.arkagdyniakosz.pl
| Home | Away |

Arka Gdynia, also known as AMW Arka Gdynia for sponsorship reasons, is a Polish professional basketball team, based in Gdynia. The team plays in the Polish PLK. The club's sponsorship name comes from Akademia Marynarki Wojennej. Historically the team is one of the most successful in Poland, mainly because of the nine championships in a row the team won from 2004 to 2012.

== History ==
The team was founded in 1995, as STK Trefl Sopot. In its first season, the team won the Polish third division and promotion to the Polish second division. In the 1996–97 season, after winning Group B of the Polish second division, the team was promoted to the top Polish Basketball League, the Dominet Bank Ekstraliga.

In 2003, Prokom Trefl played in the final of the FIBA Europe Champions Cup, against Aris. Starting in 2004, the team began to play in the EuroLeague. In its first EuroLeague season, the club became the first Polish team to reach the EuroLeague's Top 16 stage. In 2009, the club relocated from Sopot to its neighbouring city of Gdynia within the Tricity. Through the 2012–13 season, it was one of 14 clubs across Europe that held Euroleague Basketball A Licenses, which (normally) gave their holders an automatic place in the Regular Season phase of the EuroLeague.

The logo of Asseco Gdynia, used from 2013, until 2018

In 2018, the club changed its name to Arka Gdynia. It also made a return to European-wide competitions for the first time in 6 years, by playing in the 2018–19 EuroCup.

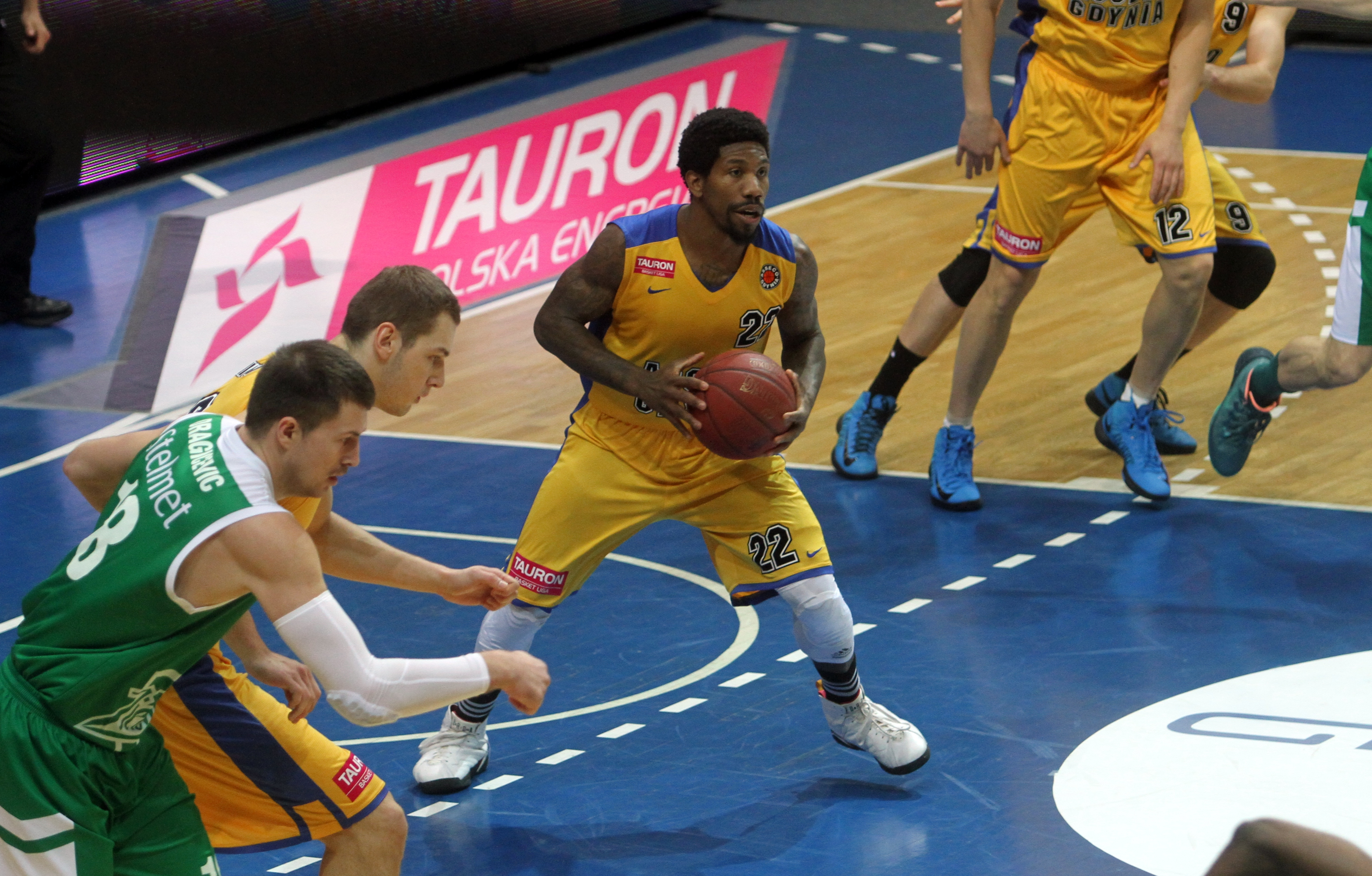
Home match with Zastal Zielona Góra in the 2013–14 PLK season

== Names ==
- Trefl Sopot (1995–1998)
- Prokom Trefl Sopot (1998–2008)
- Asseco Prokom Sopot (2008–2009)
- Asseco Prokom Gdynia (2009–2013)
- Asseco Gdynia (2013–2018)
- Arka Gdynia (2018–2019)
- Asseco Arka Gdynia (2019–2022)
- Suzuki Arka Gdynia (2022–2024)
- AMW Arka Gdynia (2024–present)

== Arena ==
Since 2009, Arka Gdynia has played its home games at the 5,500 seat Gdynia Sports Arena.

== Honours and titles ==
=== Domestic competitions ===
- Polish Championships (9):

2004, 2005, 2006, 2007, 2008, 2009, 2010, 2011, 2012

- Polish Cups (4):

2000, 2001, 2006, 2008

- Polish SuperCups (2):

2001, 2010

=== European competitions ===
- FIBA Europe Champions Cup

Runners-up (1): 2002-03

== Season by season ==
| Season | Tier | League | Pos. | Polish Cup | European competitions | | Other competitions | |
|---|---|---|---|---|---|---|---|---|
| 1995–96 | 3 | II Liga | 1st | | | | | |
| 1996–97 | 2 | I Liga | 1st | | | | | |
| 1997–98 | 1 | PLK | 9th | | | | | |
| 1998–99 | 1 | PLK | 11th | | | | | |
| 1999–00 | 1 | PLK | 9th | Champion | | | | |
| 2000–01 | 1 | PLK | 3rd | Champion | 3 Korać Cup | QF | | |
| 2001–02 | 1 | PLK | 2nd | | 3 Korać Cup | QF | | |
| 2002–03 | 1 | PLK | 2nd | | 4 Champions Cup | RU | | |
| 2003–04 | 1 | PLK | 1st | | 2 ULEB Cup | EF | | |
| 2004–05 | 1 | PLK | 1st | | 1 Euroleague | T16 | | |
| 2005–06 | 1 | PLK | 1st | Champion | 1 Euroleague | RS | | |
| 2006–07 | 1 | PLK | 1st | | 1 Euroleague | T16 | | |
| 2007–08 | 1 | PLK | 1st | Champion | 1 Euroleague | RS | | |
| 2008–09 | 1 | PLK | 1st | | 1 Euroleague | T16 | United League | 8th |
| 2009–10 | 1 | PLK | 1st | | 1 Euroleague | QF | | |
| 2010–11 | 1 | PLK | 1st | Semifinalist | 1 Euroleague | RS | United League | RS |
| 2011–12 | 1 | PLK | 1st | Quarterfinalist | 1 Euroleague | RS | United League | RS |
| 2012–13 | 1 | PLK | 6th | Semifinalist | 1 Euroleague | RS | | |
| 2013–14 | 1 | PLK | 7th | | | | | |
| 2014–15 | 1 | PLK | 7th | Quarterfinalist | | | | |
| 2015–16 | 1 | PLK | 8th | Quarterfinalist | | | | |
| 2016–17 | 1 | PLK | 13th | | | | | |
| 2017–18 | 1 | PLK | 11th | Quarterfinalist | | | | |
| 2018–19 | 1 | PLK | 3rd | Runners–up | 2 EuroCup | RS | | |
| 2019–20 | 1 | PLK | 4th | Quarterfinalist | 2 EuroCup | RS^{1} | | |
| 2020–21 | 1 | PLK | 15th | Quarterfinalist | | | | |
| 2021–22 | 1 | PLK | 13th | | | | | |
| 2022–23 | 1 | PLK | 10th | | | | | |
| 2023–24 | 1 | PLK | 13th | | | | | |
| 2024–25 | 1 | PLK | 15th | | | | | |
| 2025–26 | 1 | PLK | 4th | Quarterfinalist | | | | |

^1 Cancelled due to the COVID-19 pandemic in Europe.

== Players ==
=== Current roster ===
Note: Flags indicate national team eligibility at FIBA-sanctioned events. Players may hold other non-FIBA nationalities not displayed.

AMW Arka Gdynia roster
Players
Coaches

| Pos. | No. | Nat. | Name | Ht. | Age |
|---|---|---|---|---|---|
| F | 1 | (Poland) | Zyskowski, Jarosław | 2.03 m (6 ft 8 in) | 34 – 16 July 1992 |
| F | 6 | (Poland) | Botorek, Oliwier | 1.96 m (6 ft 5 in) | 18 – 25 September 2008 |
| G | 8 | (United States) | O'Neil, Jake | 1.93 m (6 ft 4 in) | 25 – 18 May 2001 |
| PG | 9 | (Poland) | Łączyński, Kamil | 1.83 m (6 ft 0 in) | 37 – 17 April 1989 |
| C | 10 | (Croatia) | Vucić, Mate | 2.04 m (6 ft 8 in) | 28 – 11 November 1997 |
| G | 11 | (Estonia) | Suurorg, Kasper | 1.97 m (6 ft 6 in) | 24 – 27 May 2002 |
| SG | 14 | (Poland) | Kowalczyk, Filip | 1.92 m (6 ft 4 in) | 20 – 16 April 2006 |
| G | 20 | (United States) | Stein, Alex | 1.90 m (6 ft 3 in) | 29 – 2 May 1997 |
| F | 21 | (Poland) | Nagel, Michał | 1.96 m (6 ft 5 in) | 18 – 9 July 2008 |
| SG | 30 | (Poland) | Garbacz, Jakub | 1.97 m (6 ft 6 in) | 32 – 17 March 1994 |
| PF | 33 | (United States) | Robinson, Shiloh | 2.01 m (6 ft 7 in) | 25 – 21 August 2001 |
| PF | 40 | (United States) | Lawrence, Jaquan | 2.06 m (6 ft 9 in) | 27 – 10 August 1999 |

Head coach

- (Lithuania) Mantas Česnauskis

Assistant coach(es)

- (Poland) Bartosz Sarzało
- (Poland) Roman Tymański

Legend

- (C) Team captain
- Injured

- Roster
Updated: August 30, 2026

=== Notable players ===
Note: Flags indicate national team eligibility at FIBA-sanctioned events. Players may hold other non-FIBA nationalities not displayed.

Criteria

To appear in this section a player must have either:

- Set a club record or won an individual award while at the club
- Played at least one official international match for their national team at any time
- Played at least one official NBA match at any time.

- (Poland) Andrzej Adamek
- (Poland) Łukasz Koszarek
- (Poland) David Logan
- (Poland) Paweł Mróz
- (Poland) Jeff Nordgaard
- (Poland) Piotr Szczotka
- (Bosnia and Herzegovina) Aleksandar Radojević
- (Bosnia and Herzegovina) Aleksej Nešović
- (Algeria) Ali Bouziane
- (Argentina) Rubén Wolkowyski
- (Lebanon) Julian Khazzouh
- (Austria) Rašid Mahalbašić
- (Belgium) Thomas Van Den Spiegel
- (Bosnia and Herzegovina) Ratko Varda
- (Bulgaria) Filip Videnov
- (Croatia) Alan Gregov
- (Croatia) Goran Kalamiza
- (Croatia) Josip Vranković
- (Czech Republic) Jiří Zídek
- (Denmark) Michael Andersen
- (Germany) Jan-Hendrik Jagla
- (Greece) Christos Charissis
- (Hungary) István Németh
- (Republic of Ireland) Pat Burke
- (Kosovo) Dardan Berisha
- (Lithuania) Tomas Pačėsas
- (Lithuania) Tomas Masiulis
- (Lithuania) Darius Maskoliūnas
- (Lithuania) Gintaras Einikis
- (Lithuania) Donatas Motiejūnas
- (Lithuania) Donatas Slanina
- (Puerto Rico) Christian Dalmau
- (Senegal) Pape Sow
- (Serbia) Milan Gurović
- (Serbia) Jovo Stanojević
- (Slovenia) Goran Jagodnik
- (Turkey) Hüseyin Beşok
- (United States) Alex Acker
- (United States) Gary Alexander
- (United States) Koko Archibong
- (United States) Michael Ansley
- (United States) Rashid Atkins
- (United States) Drew Barry
- (United States) Travis Best
- (United States) Jerel Blassingame
- (United States) Bobby Brown
- (United States) Duane Cooper
- (United States) Daniel Ewing
- (United States) Todd Fuller
- (United States) Alonzo Gee
- (United States) J.R. Giddens
- (United States) Lorinza Harrington
- (United States) Byron Houston
- (United States) Harold Jamison
- (United States) Oliver Lafayette
- (United States) Jerrod Mustaf
- (United States) Mustafa Shakur
- (United States) Dajuan Wagner
- (United States) Mike Wilks
- (United States) Qyntel Woods

== Head coaches ==
- (Poland) Adam Ziemiński
- (Poland) Tadeusz Aleksandrowicz
- (Poland) Tomasz Służałek
- (Poland) Krzysztof Koziorowicz
- (Poland) Arkadiusz Koniecki
- (Poland) Ryszard Szczechowiak
- (Poland) Eugeniusz Kijewski 2000–2007
- (Poland) Mariusz Karol
- (Lithuania) Tomas Pačėsas 2007–2012
- (Poland) Andrzej Adamek 2012
- (Lithuania) Kęstutis Kemzūra 2012
- (Slovenia) David Dedek 2013–2015
- (North Macedonia) Tane Spasev 2015–2016
- (Poland) Przemysław Frasunkiewicz 2016–2020
- (Serbia) Miloš Mitrović 2021–2022
- (Poland) Krzysztof Szubarga 2022–2023
- (Poland) Wojciech Bychawski 2023–2024
- (Poland) Artur Gronek 2024–2025
- (Lithuania) Mantas Česnauskis 2025–present
