= 2018–19 PLK season =

Energa Basket Liga
- Season: 2018–19
- Dates: 2 October 2018 – 14 June 2019
- Teams: 16

Regular season
- Season MVP: (United States) James Florence

Finals
- Champions: Anwil Włocławek (3rd title)
- Runners-up: Polski Cukier Toruń
- Third place: Arka Gdynia
- Fourth place: Stelmet Enea Zielona Góra
- Finals MVP: (Cape Verde) Ivan Almeida

Statistical leaders
Points	(United States) Jabarie Hinds	21.7
Rebounds	(United States) Shawn King	11.1
Assists	(United States) Obie Trotter	7.6
Index Rating	(United States) Shawn King	20.9

The 2018–19 Polish Basketball League (PLK) season, the Energa Basket Liga for sponsorship reasons, was the 85th season of the Polish Basketball League, the highest professional basketball league in Poland. Anwil Włocławek defended its title and repeated as Polish champions.

== Teams ==
Czarni Słupsk withdrew during the 2017–18 PLK season because of financial problems.

On 17 May 2018, Spójnia Stargard promoted to the PLK as the winners of the I Liga, after defeating Sokół Łańcut 3–0 in the playoff finals.

Also, during the pre-season, PGE Turów Zgorzelec withdrew from the tournament.

=== Locations and venues ===
Location of teams in the 2018–19 PLK season

Team	Location	Arena	Capacity
Anwil Włocławek	Włocławek	Hala Mistrzów	4,200
Arka Gdynia	Gdynia	Gdynia Sports Arena	5,500
AZS Koszalin	Koszalin	Hala Widowiskowo-Sportowa	3,000
BM Slam Stal Ostrów Wielkopolski	Ostrów Wielkopolski	Hala Sportowa Stal	1,200
GTK Gliwice	Gliwice	Arena Gliwice	1,092
HydroTruck Radom	Radom	ZSE Radom	1,200
Legia Warsaw	Warsaw	OSiR Bemowo	1,000
Miasto Szkła Krosno	Krosno	MOSiR Krosno	1,380
MKS Dąbrowa Górnicza	Dąbrowa Górnicza	Centrum Hall	2,944
Polpharma Starogard Gdański	Starogard Gdański	Argo-Kociewie	2,500
Polski Cukier Toruń	Toruń	Arena Toruń	6,248
Stelmet Enea Zielona Góra	Zielona Góra	CRS Hall	6,080
TBV Start Lublin	Lublin	Hala Globus	5,000
Spójnia Stargard	Stargard	Hala Miejska	2,500
Trefl Sopot	Sopot	Ergo Arena	15,000
Wilki Morskie Szczecin	Szczecin	Azoty Arena	7,403

== Regular season ==
=== League table ===
Pos	Team	Pld	W	L	PF	PA	PD	Pts	Qualification or relegation
1	Arka Gdynia	30	25	5	2575	2393	+182	55	Qualification to playoffs
2	Polski Cukier Toruń	30	24	6	2678	2413	+265	54	Qualification to playoffs
3	Stelmet Enea Zielona Góra	30	24	6	2707	2410	+297	54	Qualification to playoffs
4	Anwil Włocławek (C)	30	22	8	2728	2460	+268	52	Qualification to playoffs
5	BM Slam Stal Ostrów Wielkopolski	30	20	10	2577	2344	+233	50	Qualification to playoffs
6	MKS Dąbrowa Górnicza	30	17	13	2501	2314	+187	47	Qualification to playoffs
7	King Szczecin	30	15	15	2565	2527	+38	45	Qualification to playoffs
8	Legia Warsaw	30	15	15	2369	2396	−27	45	Qualification to playoffs
9	Polpharma Starogard Gdański	30	13	17	2711	2744	−33	43	
10	TBV Start Lublin	30	13	17	2514	2525	−11	43	
11	HydroTruck Radom	30	11	19	2348	2543	−195	41	
12	GTK Gliwice	30	11	19	2468	2669	−201	41	
13	Spójnia Stargard	30	9	21	2357	2551	−194	39	
14	AZS Koszalin	30	8	22	2421	2655	−234	38	
15	Trefl Sopot	30	7	23	2493	2598	−105	37	
16	Miasto Szkła Krosno (R)	30	6	24	2438	2708	−270	36	Relegation to Liga I

Source: PLK
(C) Champions; (R) Relegated

=== Results ===
Home \ Away	ANW	GDY	AZS	STA	GTK	RAD	LEG	KRO	MKS	POL	TOR	SPO	LUB	ZIE	SOP	SZC
Anwil Włocławek	—	66–83	77–80	844–78	113–81	97–73	89–75	104–76	77–79	122–115	76–79	80–81	90–80	93–84	97–85	86–82
Arka Gdynia	98–89	—	77–72	86–73	86–70	100–73	79–69	91–78	76–86	86–80	88–72	89–88	83–78	78–65	90–88	72–81
AZS Koszalin	76–91	84–89	—	78–123	82–85	78–75	90–67	99–94	85–89	77–74	73–82	68–74	126–122	72–81	67–102	88–71
BM Slam Stal Ostrów Wielkopolski	73–80	65–75	100–76	—	89–61	89–70	84–62	94–60	76–82	101–79	67–86	86–84	87–84	81–72	91–77	92–70
GTK Gliwice	81–86	74–78	95–71	76–114	—	80–78	86–71	98–88	77–74	82–85	70–94	101–93	91–102	74–79	77–75	95–81
HydroTruck Radom	68–81	77–94	91–78	80–84	91–72	—	87–82	85–68	65–76	88–81	85–87	76–72	87–79	74–70	75–68	61–79
Legia Warsaw	72–103	78–85	79–69	68–77	84–67	94–72	—	86–78	75–77	91–76	68–63	76–72	83–78	59–76	75–58	75–70
Miasto Szkła Krosno	88–93	72–96	93–86	79–82	101–89	76–92	85–88	—	86–97	100–92	70–95	93–76	73–87	73–87	79–76	86–92
MKS Dąbrowa Górnicza	81–101	62–82	93–91	94–82	79–86	82–74	74–80	88–82	—	103–106	93–84	86–80	87–84	78–102	69–84	82–91
Polpharma Starogard Gdański	95–92	100–104	99–84	75–90	96–80	107–86	102–97	105–77	99–105	—	97–88	93–90	96–77	80–94	100–90	94–99
Polski Cukier Toruń	80–89	96–73	89–65	87–70	113–98	92–56	94–80	99–91	91–77	96–87	—	94–69	87–86	93–89	90–83	87–71
Spójnia Stargard	75–91	95–70	76–73	79–88	89–83	80–83	72–94	90–78	61–81	72–65	75–85	—	75–87	59–85	76–82	64–95
TBV Start Lublin	70–88	71–80	81–59	88–83	85–73	109–91	67–81	83–75	72–84	104–91	93–91	78–93	—	69–77	100–75	71–80
Stelmet Enea Zielona Góra	93–91	113–93	97–80	83–76	104–76	99–71	100–96	105–87	87–81	96–80	107–110	104–87	92–70	—	93–75	96–89
Trefl Sopot	82–92	84–89	90–100	93–96	96–99	97–93	88–92	79–86	70–80	82–71	72–76	96–98	77–75	85–90	—	82–88
King Szczecin	97–110	94–105	99–94	76–86	92–91	92–71	80–72	74–66	99–84	91–101	95–98	91–62	72–75	80–87	94–104	—

Source: PLK
Legend: Blue = home team win; Red = away team win.

== Playoffs ==
Quarterfinals and semifinals are played in a best-of-five format (2-2-1) while the finals in a best-of-seven one (2-2-1-1-1).

=== Bracket ===
Quarterfinals
1	Arka Gdynia	3
8	Legia Warsaw	2
4	Anwil Włocławek	3
5	Stal Ostrów Wielkopolski	0
2	Polski Cukier Toruń	3
7	King Szczecin	0
3	Stelmet Enea Zielona Góra	3
6	MKS Dąbrowa Górnicza	1

Semifinals
1	Arka Gdynia	2
4	Anwil Włocławek	3
2	Polski Cukier Toruń	3
3	Stelmet Enea Zielona Góra	0

Finals
4	Anwil Włocławek	4
2	Polski Cukier Toruń	3
Third place
1	Arka Gdynia	182
3	Stelmet Enea Zielona Góra	175

=== Quarter-finals ===
Team 1	Series	Team 2	Game 1	Game 2	Game 3	Game 4	Game 5
Arka Gdynia	3–2	Legia Warsaw	79–75	109–87	91–97	94–100	94–75
Polski Cukier Toruń	3–0	King Szczecin	70–65	91–85	95–9		
Stelmet Enea Zielona Góra	3–1	MKS Dąbrowa Górnicza	88–80	89–97	99–79	81–73	
Anwil Włocławek	3–0	BM Slam Stal Ostrów Wielkopolski	89–84	86–78	105–98		

=== Semi-finals ===
Team 1	Series	Team 2	Game 1	Game 2	Game 3	Game 4	Game 5
Arka Gdynia	2–3	Anwil Włocławek	94–91	78–65	79–87	85–90	97-109
Polski Cukier Toruń	3–0	Stelmet Enea Zielona Góra	88–77	81–67	86–81		

=== Third place series ===
Team 1	Agg.	Team 2	1st leg	2nd leg
Arka Gdynia	182–175	Stelmet Enea Zielona Góra	77–95	105–80

=== Finals ===
Team 1	Series	Team 2	Game 1	Game 2	Game 3	Game 4	Game 5	Game 6	Game 7
Polski Cukier Toruń	3–4	Anwil Włocławek	96–89	78–89	86–96	83–82	74–70	85–103	77–89

== Awards ==
All official awards of the 2018–19 PLK season.

=== PLK Most Valuable Player ===
Player	Team	Ref.
(United States) James Florence	Arka Gdynia	

=== PLK Best Defender ===
Player	Team	Ref.
(Lithuania) Martynas Paliukėnas	King Szczecin	

=== PLK Best Polish Player ===
Player	Team	Ref.
(Poland) Michał Sokołowski	Stelmet Enea Zielona Góra	

=== PLK Best Coach ===
Player	Team	Ref.
(Poland) Przemysław Frasunkiewicz	Asseco Arka Gdynia	

=== All-PLK Team ===
Player	Team	Ref.
(United States) James Florence	Asseco Arka Gdynia	
(United States) Josh Bostic	Asseco Arka Gdynia	
(Poland) Michał Sokołowski	Stelmet Enea BC Zielona Góra	
(Montenegro) Vladimir Dragičević	MKS Dąbrowa Górnicza	
(Poland) Aaron Cel	Polski Cukier Toruń	

== Polish clubs in European competitions ==
Team	Competition	Progress
Arka Gdynia	EuroCup	Regular season
Anwil Włocławek	Champions League	Regular season
Polski Cukier Toruń	Champions League	Third qualifying round
HydroTruck Radom	FIBA Europe Cup	First qualifying round

== Polish clubs in Regional competitions ==
Team	Competition	Progress
Stelmet Zielona Góra	VTB United League	12th
GTK Gliwice	Alpe Adria Cup	Semifinals
