= Dariusz Zelig =

Polish basketball player (born 1957)

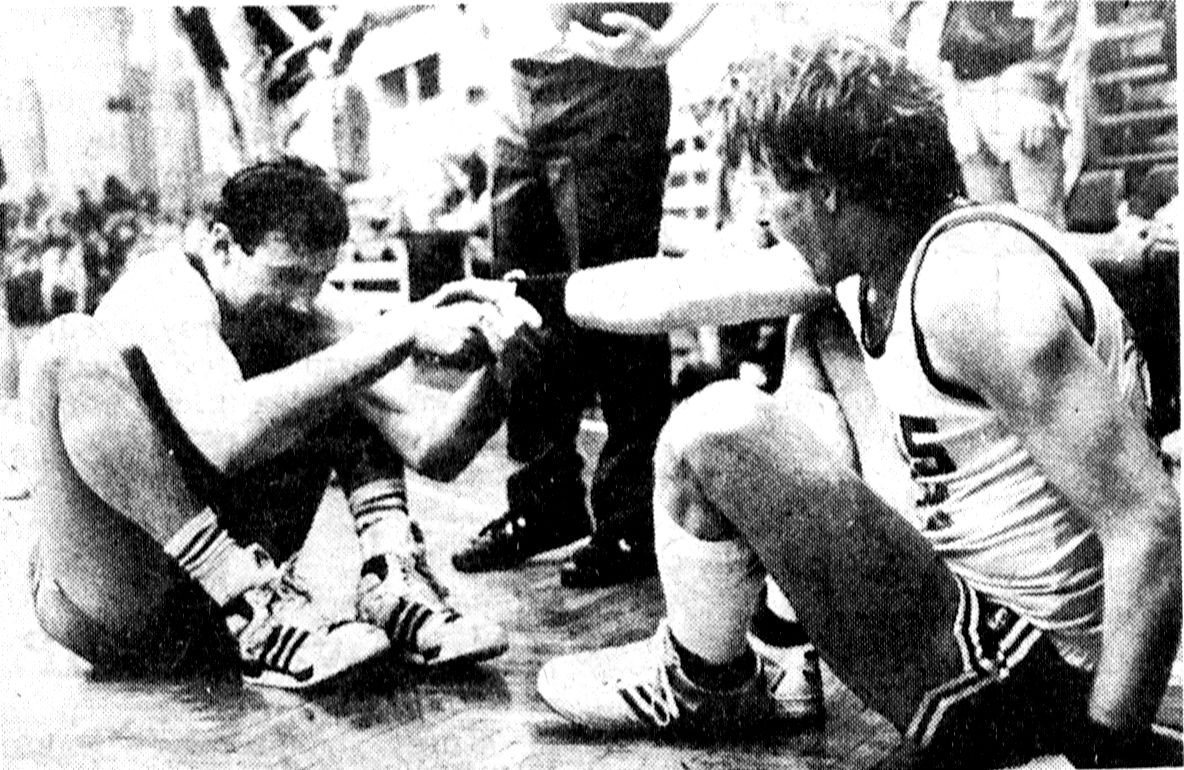

Personal information
- Nationality: Polish
- Born: 22 November 1957 (age 68) Koszalin, Poland

Sport
- Sport: Basketball

Dariusz Zelig (born 22 November 1957) is a Polish former basketball player. He competed in the men's tournament at the 1980 Summer Olympics.
