= Śląsk Wrocław (basketball) =

Polish basketball team

WKS Śląsk Wrocław
- Nickname: WKS; Wojskowi (Military)
- Leagues: PLK; EuroCup
- Founded: 1948; 78 years ago
- History: Śląsk Wrocław (1948–present)
- Arena: Hala Orbita, Centennial Hall
- Capacity: 3,000, 5,800
- Location: Wrocław, Poland
- Team colors: Green, white, red
- President: Michał Mazur
- Head coach: Danny Franco
- Team captain: Jakub Nizioł
- Championships: 18 Polish Championships; 14 Polish Cups; 3 Polish Supercups
- Website: wks-slask.eu
Home	Away	Third

WKS Śląsk Wrocław is a Polish professional basketball club based in Wrocław. Founded in 1948, Śląsk is the most decorated Polish basketball club, with 18 Polish League and 14 Polish cup championships. The club plays in the Polish Basketball League (PLK), the highest-tier level in Polish men's basketball, and in the EuroCup. The home court is Hala Orbita, but many games are played in Centennial Hall.

== History ==
Since the basketball section was founded in 1948, Śląsk Wrocław has been the most decorated and most recognizable club in Polish basketball. The team has won the Polish league championships 18 times so far. Most recognized period of Śląsk's history is the "Great Śląsk Era" when the team won five championship titles in a row (1998–2002) and 10 in 12 seasons (1991–2002).

Most of those successes where achieved with coach Andrej Urlep. The notable players playing for Śląsk Wrocław over the years were: Mieczysław Łopatka (1960s), Edward Jurkiewicz (1970s and 1980s), Jerzy Binkowski (1980s, 1990s), Dariusz Zelig (1980s, 1990s), Maciej Zieliński (1980s, 1990s, 2000s), Adam Wójcik and Dominik Tomczyk.

In 2008 the club has gone into serious financial difficulties, which resulted in withdrawing the team from Polish Basketball League. After years of rebuilding attempts, the club is now back playing in the Polish Basketball League top division.

In the 2020–21 PLK season, the team finished third. Śląsk defeated Legia Warszawa 86:85 in overtime of the decisive game 3 of the bronze medal series. The result exceeded expectations as it was the club's first league podium finish in 11 years. Key players of that team included Aleksander Dziewa, Kyle Gibson, Elijah Stewart and Strahinja Jovanović.

The following season the club returned to the top of the domestic competition becoming Polish champions, twenty years after the last championship won in 2002. Travis Trice won MVP awards for both the regular season and the finals.

== Season by season (since 1990) ==
Season	Tier	League	Pos.	Polish Cup	European competitions		
1990–91	1	PLK	Champion		2 FIBA European Cup Winners' Cup	T16	0-2
1991–92	1	PLK	Champion	Winner	1 FIBA European League / 2 European Cup	R3	1-3
1992–93	1	PLK	Champion		1 FIBA EuroLeague	R2	2-2
1993–94	1	PLK	Champion		1 FIBA EuroLeague	R1	0-2
1994–95	1	PLK	5th		1 FIBA EuroLeague	R1	0-2
1995–96	1	PLK	Champion		3 FIBA Korać Cup	R1	1-1
1996–97	1	PLK	4th	Winner	2 FIBA EuroCup	QF	9-7
1997–98	1	PLK	Champion		2 FIBA EuroCup	QF	9-6
1998–99	1	PLK	Champion		2 FIBA Saporta Cup	R32	5-7
1999–00	1	PLK	Champion		2 FIBA Saporta Cup	QF	10-6
2000–01	1	PLK	Champion		1 FIBA SuproLeague	T16	7-13
2001–02	1	PLK	Champion		1 Euroleague	RS	4–10
2002–03	1	PLK	3nd		1 Euroleague	RS	5–9
2003–04	1	PLK	2nd	Winner	1 Euroleague	RS	6–8
2004–05	1	PLK	5th	Winner	2 ULEB Cup	T16	6–6
2005–06	1	PLK	5th		3 FIBA EuroCup	T16	6–6
2006–07	1	PLK	3rd				
2007–08	1	PLK	3rd (Note: Withdrew from the PLK after bankruptcy.)	Runner-up	2 ULEB Cup	T32	5–7
2008–09	3	II Liga	11th				
2009–10	3	II Liga	12th				
2010–11	3	II Liga	12th				
2011–12	3	II Liga	1st				
2012–13	2	I Liga	1st				
2013–14	1	PLK	9th	Winner			
2014–15	1	PLK	5th	Quarterfinalist			
2015–16	1	PLK	14th (Note: Withdrew from the PLK due to financial problems.)		3 FIBA Europe Cup	R32	4–8
2016–17	3	II Liga	1st				
2017–18	2	I Liga	9th				
2018–19	2	I Liga	2nd				
2019–20	1	PLK	7th (Note: Season shortened due to the COVID-19 outbreak.)				
2020–21	1	PLK	3rd	Quarterfinalist			
2021–22	1	PLK	Champion	Semifinalist	2 EuroCup	T16	3–14
2022–23	1	PLK	2nd	Quarterfinalist	2 EuroCup	RS	1–17
2023–24	1	PLK	3rd		2 EuroCup	RS	2–16
2024–25	1	PLK	8th	Quarterfinalist	3 Basketball Champions League	RS	1–5
2025–26	1	PLK	6th	Semifinalist	2 EuroCup	RS	5–13

== Players ==
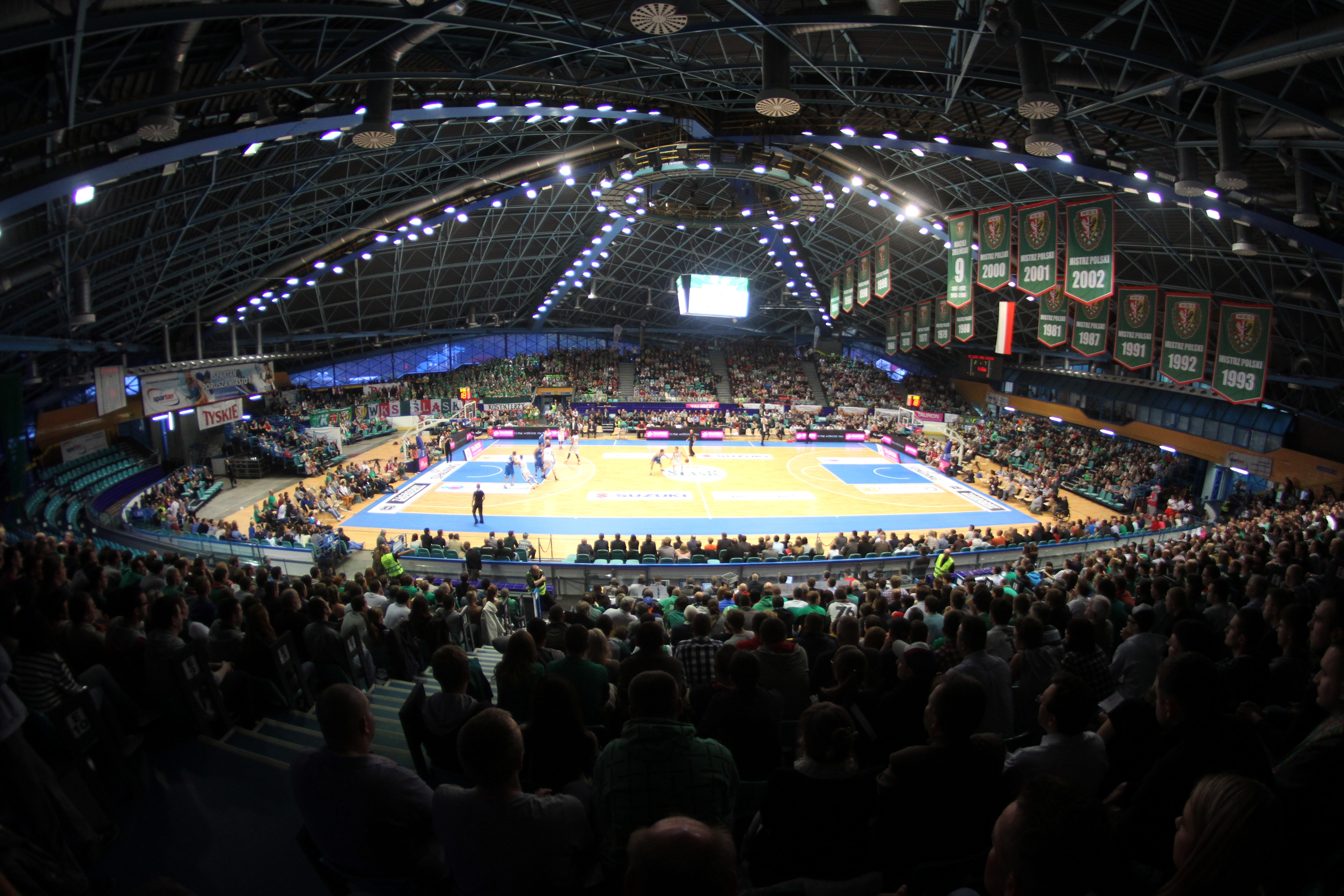
Hala Orbita

=== Current roster ===
Note: Flags indicate national team eligibility at FIBA-sanctioned events. Players may hold other non-FIBA nationalities not displayed.

Śląsk Wrocław roster
Players
Coaches

Pos.	No.	Nat.	Name
PG	2	(United States)	Hickey, Anthony	1.80 m (5 ft 11 in)	33 – 22 November 1992
G	3	(United States)	Parsons, Malik	1.91 m (6 ft 3 in)	27 – 17 August 1999
PF	5	(United States)	Robinson, Devin	2.03 m (6 ft 8 in)	31 – 7 March 1995
G	8	(Poland)	Wrzeszcz, Anthony	1.93 m (6 ft 4 in)	22 – 18 May 2004
G	10	(United States)	Scruggs, Paul	1.91 m (6 ft 3 in)	28 – 9 March 1998
G/F	11	(Poland)	Kulikowski, Błażej	1.95 m (6 ft 5 in)	25 – 3 January 2001
C	15	(Nigeria)	Egbunu, John	2.11 m (6 ft 11 in)	32 – 21 October 1994
C	17	(Poland)	Dunin-Wąsowicz, Leon	2.12 m (6 ft 11 in)	19 – 13 April 2007
PF	22	(Poland)	Sternicki, Tymoteusz	2.03 m (6 ft 8 in)	20 – 10 June 2006
G	27	(Poland)	Czerniewicz, Błażej	1.98 m (6 ft 6 in)	23 – 15 December 2002
C	31	(United States)	Coleman-Jones, Jared	2.08 m (6 ft 10 in)	26 – 13 September 2000
SF	35	(Poland)	Nizioł, Jakub (C)	2.01 m (6 ft 7 in)	30 – 8 May 1996

Head coach

- (Israel) Danny Franco

Assistant coach(es)

- (Poland) Jacek Winnicki
- (Poland) Jakub Pendrakowski

Legend

- (C) Team captain
- Injured

- Roster
Updated: November 7, 2026

=== Retired numbers ===
Śląsk Wrocław retired numbers
N°	Nat.	Player	Position	Tenure
9	(Poland)	Maciej Zieliński	G/F	1987–1992, 1995–2006
10	(Poland)	Adam Wójcik	PF	1997–2001, 2003–2004, 2011–2012
11	(Poland)	Mieczysław Łopatka	SF	1961–1972

=== Notable players ===
Note: Flags indicate national team eligibility at FIBA-sanctioned events. Players may hold other non-FIBA nationalities not displayed.

Criteria

To appear in this section a player must have either:

- Set a club record or won an individual award while at the club
- Played at least one official international match for their national team at any time
- Played at least one official NBA match at any time.

- (Poland) Mieczysław Łopatka
- (Poland) Dariusz Zelig
- (Poland) Maciej Zieliński
- (Poland) Dominik Tomczyk
- (Poland) Adam Wójcik
- (Croatia) Alan Gregov
- (Latvia) Raimonds Miglinieks
- (Latvia) Roberts Štelmahers
- (Lithuania) Dainius Adomaitis
- (Lithuania) Gintaras Einikis
- (Lithuania) Tomas Pačėsas
- (Lithuania) Andrius Giedraitis
- (Russia) Andrey Fetisov
- (Serbia) Dušan Miletić
- (New Zealand) Sean Marks
- (United States) Keith Williams
- (United States) / (Poland) Joe McNaull
- (United States) LaBradford Smith
- (United States) Harold Jamison
- (United States) Charles O'Bannon
- (United States) Michael Hawkins
- (United States) Michael Wright
- (United States) Lynn Greer
- (United States) Dean Oliver
- (United States) Travis Trice

== Achievements ==
- Polish League (18):
  - Winner (18): 1965, 1970, 1977, 1979, 1980, 1981, 1987, 1991, 1992, 1993, 1994, 1996, 1998, 1999, 2000, 2001, 2002, 2022
  - Runners-up (7): 1963, 1964, 1972, 1978, 1989, 2004, 2023
  - Third place (16): 1960, 1966, 1967, 1969, 1971, 1973, 1974, 1982, 1985, 1986, 1990, 2003, 2007, 2008, 2021, 2024
- 1 Liga (1):
  - Winner (1): 2012–13
- Polish Cup (14):
  - 1957, 1959, 1972, 1973, 1977, 1980, 1989, 1990, 1992, 1997, 2004, 2005, 2014
- Polish Supercup (3):
  - 1999, 2000, 2024

== See also ==
- Śląsk Wrocław
- Śląsk Wrocław (handball)
