= Lech Poznań (basketball) =

KKS Lech Poznań
- Founded: 19 March 1922; 104 years ago (sports club); 1930; 96 years ago (basketball section)
- Folded: 1997; 29 years ago
- Location: Poznań, Poland
- Championships: Men's: 11 Polish Championships; 3 Polish Cups; 4 Junior Championships; Women's: 1 Polish Championship; 4 Junior Championships
| Home | Away |

Koszykarski Klub Sportowy Lech Poznań (Basketball Sports Club Lech Poznań) was the professional basketball section of the Polish multi-sports club Lech Poznań.

== History ==
The club was established in 1922, with the basketball section founded in 1930. They competed in the Polish League until the summer of 1997, when due to financial and organizational problems, the club was withdrawn from the national league.

In European-wide competitions, a great achievement for Lech Poznań was its qualification to the EuroLeague's last 8 stage of the 1989–90 season, along with other clubs such as: Maccabi Tel Aviv, Olimpia Milano, Barcelona, Jugoplastika Split, Aris Thessaloniki, and Limoges.

== Honours ==
=== Men's ===
Polish League

- Winners (11): 1935, 1939, 1946, 1948–49, 1950–51, 1954–55, 1957–58, 1982–83, 1983–84, 1988–89, 1989–90
- Runners-up (7): 1937, 1948, 1950, 1961, 1982, 1985, 1991
- Third place (7): 1938, 1947, 1956, 1959, 1987, 1988, 1994

Polish Cup

- Winners (4): 1935–36, 1953–54, 1954–55, 1983–84
- Runners-up (3): 1970, 1975, 1977

European Champions Cup

- Semifinalists (1): 1958–59
- Quarterfinalists (1): 1989–90

Junior Polish Championship

- Winners (4): 1952, 1966, 1983, 1991
- Runners-up (2): 1960, 1964
- Third place (1): 1993

=== Women's ===
Polish League

- Winners (1): 1957
- Runners-up (3): 1955, 1956, 1990
- Third place (5): 1958, 1971, 1972, 1973, 1984

Junior Polish Championship

- Winners (4): 1955, 1956, 1962, 1994
- Runners-up (1): 1963
- Third place (1): 1993
