= Polish Basketball Cup =

- Organising body: Polish Basketball League
- Founded: 1933; 93 years ago
- First season: 1933–34
- Country: Poland
- Number of teams: 8
- Related competitions: Polish League; Polish Supercup
- Current champions: Trefl Sopot (4th title)
- Most championships: Śląsk Wrocław (14 titles)
- 2026 Polish Basketball Cup

The Polish Basketball Cup (Polish: Puchar Polski w koszykówce mężczyzn) is the annual top-tier level national domestic basketball cup competition for clubs in Poland. It is managed and organised by the Polish Basketball League (PLK). The competition was founded in 1933. Śląsk Wrocław has won the most titles, with 14 trophies.

== History ==
The creation of the tournament was initiated in 1933, by the Polish Association of Sports Games (PZGS), an organisation which carried out the organisation of national sports competitions in Poland.

== Format ==
Since the 2012 season, a Final Eight format is used, in which the highest placed teams from the first half of a given Polish Basketball League (PLK) regular season qualify. Games are usually played over a four-day span in February. Additionally, the host of the tournament gains automatic qualification to the tournament.

== Finals ==
Season	Champion	Score	Runner-up	Location	MVP	Ref.
2000–01	Prokom Trefl Sopot	81–72	Znicz Pruszków	Słupsk	(Croatia) Igor Miličić	
2001–02	not held					
2002–03	not held					
2004	Śląsk Wrocław	78–72	Anwil Włocławek	Włocławek	(United States) Lynn Greer	
2004–05	Śląsk Wrocław	96–91	Czarni Słupsk	Koszalin	(Poland) Michał Ignerski	
2005–06	Prokom Trefl Sopot	77–64	Polpharma Starogard Gdański	Grudziądz	(Puerto Rico) Christian Dalmau	
2007	Anwil Włocławek	72–66	Prokom Trefl Sopot	Sopot	(Poland) Andrzej Pluta	
2008	Prokom Trefl Sopot	81–69	ASCO Śląsk Wrocław	Sopot	(United States) Mustafa Shakur	
2009	Kotwica Kołobrzeg	98–89	Asseco Prokom Sopot	Lublin	(Poland) Dawid Przybyszewski	
2009–10	AZS Koszalin	80–75	Turów Zgorzelec	Warsaw	(United States) Dante Swanson	
2010–11	Polpharma Starogard Gdański	75–67	Anwil Włocławek	Gdynia	(Poland) Robert Skibniewski	
2012	Trefl Sopot	77–74	Zastal Zielona Góra	Zielona Góra	(Poland) Łukasz Koszarek	
2012–13	Trefl Sopot	64–59	AZS Koszalin	Koszalin	(Poland) Adam Waczyński	
2013–14	Śląsk Wrocław	90–87	Turów Zgorzelec	Wrocław	(Poland) Michał Gabiński	
2015	Stelmet Zielona Góra	77–71	Rosa Radom	Gdynia	(Poland) Przemysław Zamojski	
2016	Rosa Radom	74–64	Stelmet Zielona Góra	Dąbrowa Górnicza	(United States) C. J. Harris	
2017	Stelmet Zielona Góra	79–57	Anwil Włocławek	Warsaw	(Poland) Łukasz Koszarek	
2018	Polski Cukier Toruń	88–80	Stelmet Enea Zielona Góra	Warsaw	(Poland) Karol Gruszecki	
2019	Stal Ostrów Wielkopolski	77–74	Arka Gdynia	Warsaw	(Poland) Mateusz Kostrzewski	
2020	Anwil Włocławek	103–96	Twarde Pierniki Toruń	Warsaw	(United States) Shawn Jones	
2021	Zastal Zielona Góra	86–73	Spójnia Stargard	Lublin	(Denmark) Iffe Lundberg	
2022	BM Slam Stal Ostrów Wielkopolski	83–76	Polski Cukier Pszczółka Start Lublin	Lublin	(Poland) Jakub Garbacz	
2023	Trefl Sopot	91–80	Polski Cukier Pszczółka Start Lublin	Lublin	(United States) Garrett Nevels	
2024	Legia Warsaw	94–71	BM Stal Ostrów Wielkopolski	Sosnowiec	(United States) Aric Holman	
2025	Górnik Zamek Książ Wałbrzych	80–78	King Szczecin	Sosnowiec	(United States) Toddrick Gotcher	
2026	Trefl Sopot	91–67	Zastal Zielona Góra	Sosnowiec	(United States) Paul Scruggs	

== Titles by club ==
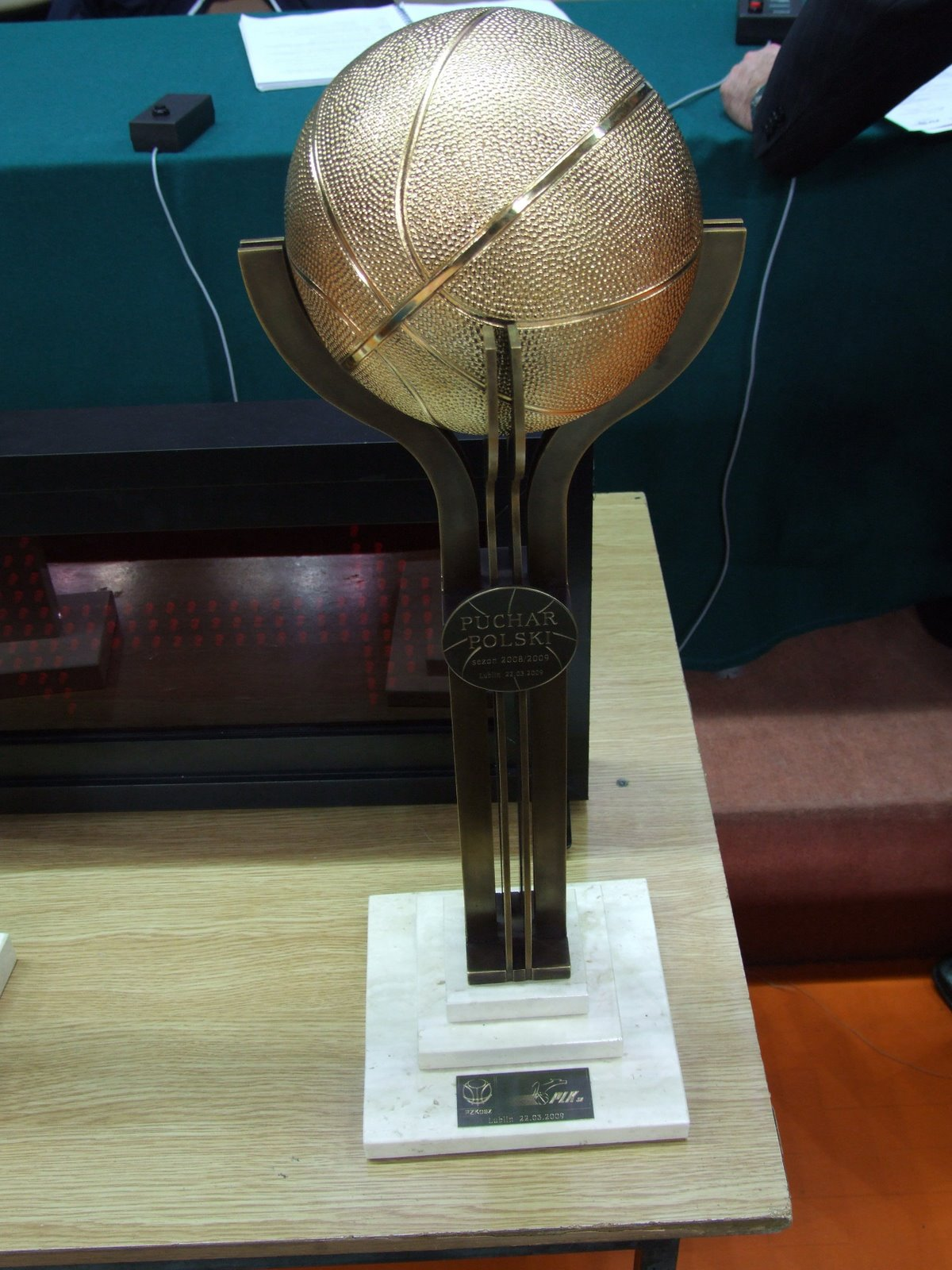
The trophy the winner of the Puchar Polski receives.

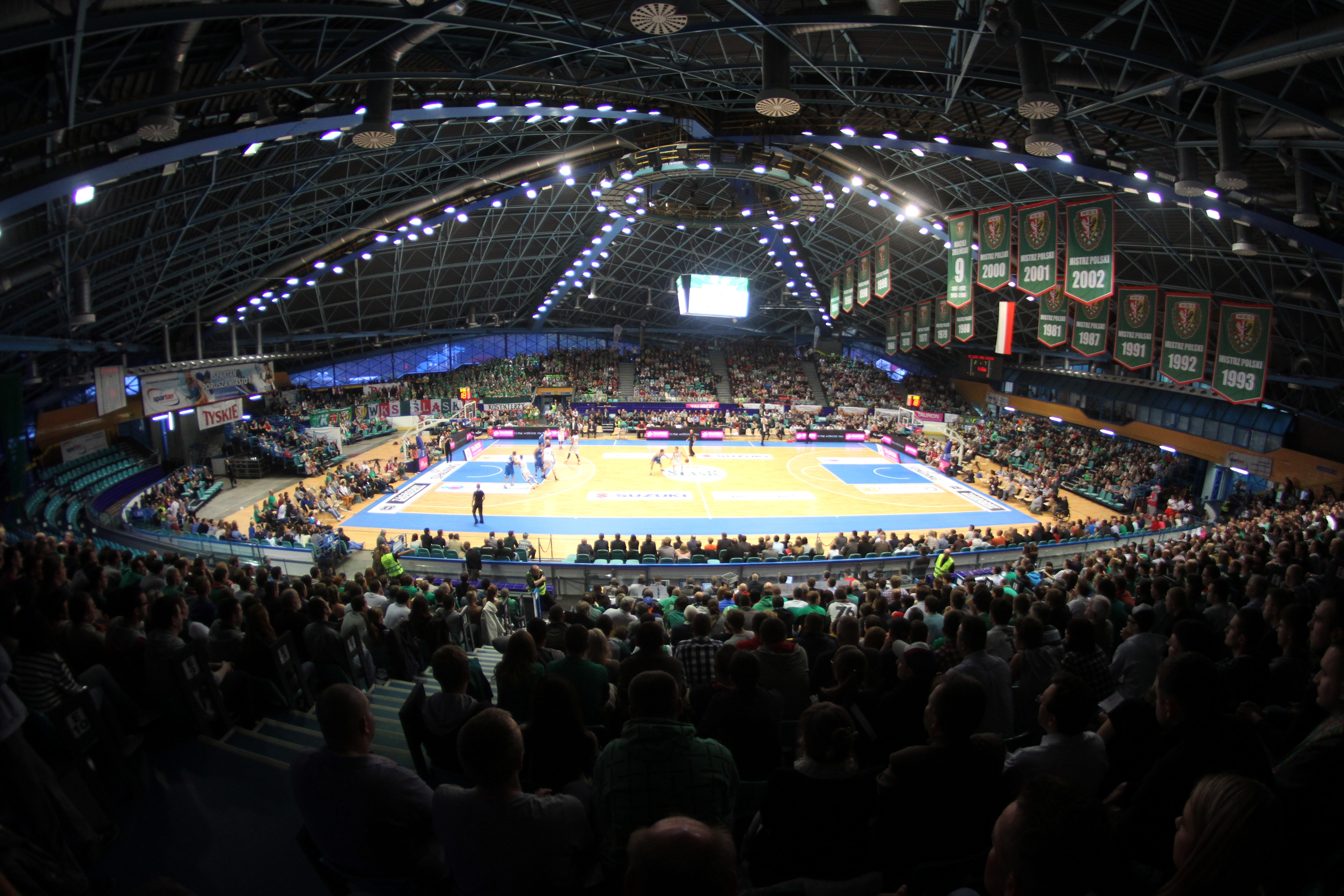
Scene of the final of the 2014 Cup in Wrocław.

Club	Titles	Years won
Śląsk Wrocław	14	1957, 1959, 1971, 1972, 1973, 1977, 1980, 1989, 1990, 1992, 1997, 2004, 2005, 2014
Asseco Gdynia^{1}	4	2000, 2001, 2006, 2008
Lech Poznań	4	1936, 1954, 1955, 1984
Anwil Włocławek	4	1995, 1996, 2007, 2020
Trefl Sopot^{1}	4	2012, 2013, 2023, 2026
Legia Warsaw	3	1968, 1970, 2024
Polonia Warsaw	3	1934, 1969, 1975
Wybrzeże Gdańsk	3	1976, 1978, 1979
Zielona Góra	3	2015, 2017, 2021
Cracovia	2	1935, 1936
Spójnia Gdańsk	2	1953, 1962
AZS-AWF Warsaw	2	1956, 1958
Pogoń Szczecin	2	1981, 1985
Pekaes Pruszków	2	1998, 1999
Stal Ostrów Wielkopolski	2	2019, 2022
Twarde Pierniki Toruń	1	2018
City Gdańsk	1	1951
Wisła Kraków	1	1952
Resovia	1	1974
Zagłębie Sosnowiec	1	1983
Kotwica Kołobrzeg	1	2009
AZS Koszalin	1	2010
Polpharma Starogard Gdański	1	2011
Rosa Radom	1	2016
Górnik Zamek Książ Wałbrzych	1	2025

^1 The history of Prokom Trefl Sopot stays with Asseco Gdynia.

== See also ==
- Polish League
- Polish Supercup
