= Eurocup 2014–15 Regular Season Group F =

Standings and results for Group F of the Regular Season phase of the 2014–15 Eurocup basketball tournament.

== Standings ==
Pos	Team	Pld	W	L	PF	PA	PD
1	(Russia) Lokomotiv Kuban	10	10	0	795	653	+142
2	(Greece) PAOK	10	6 (Note: Head-to-head: 1-1 (+1))	4	726	726	0
3	(Turkey) Pınar Karşıyaka	10	6 (Note: Head-to-head: 1-1 (-1))	4	780	763	+17
4	(Montenegro) Budućnost VOLI	10	3 (Note: Head-to-head: 2-0)	7	784	797	−13
5	(Poland) Stelmet Zielona Góra	10	3 (Note: Head-to-head: 0-2)	7	722	809	−87
6	(Latvia) Ventspils	10	2	8	665	724	−59

Source: Euroleague Basketball

== Fixtures and results ==
=== Game 1 ===
15 October 2014

Ventspils (Latvia)	82–75	(Montenegro) Budućnost VOLI

15 October 2014

Pınar Karşıyaka (Turkey)	81–87	(Greece) PAOK

15 October 2014

Stelmet Zielona Góra (Poland)	78–97	(Russia) Lokomotiv Kuban

=== Game 2 ===
22 October 2014

PAOK (Greece)	85–66	(Poland) Stelmet Zielona Góra

22 October 2014

Lokomotiv Kuban (Russia)	72–60	(Latvia) Ventspils

22 October 2014

Budućnost VOLI (Montenegro)	79–82	(Turkey) Pınar Karşıyaka

=== Game 3 ===
28 October 2014

Lokomotiv Kuban (Russia)	87–46	(Greece) PAOK

29 October 2014

Stelmet Zielona Góra (Poland)	76–90	(Montenegro) Budućnost VOLI

29 October 2014

Ventspils (Latvia)	72–81	(Turkey) Pınar Karşıyaka

=== Game 4 ===
5 November 2014

Ventspils (Latvia)	63–66	(Greece) PAOK

5 November 2014

Budućnost VOLI (Montenegro)	63–77	(Russia) Lokomotiv Kuban

5 November 2014

Pınar Karşıyaka (Turkey)	83–67	(Poland) Stelmet Zielona Góra

=== Game 5 ===
12 November 2014

Lokomotiv Kuban (Russia)	75–63	(Turkey) Pınar Karşıyaka

12 November 2014

PAOK (Greece)	80–60	(Montenegro) Budućnost VOLI

12 November 2014

Stelmet Zielona Góra (Poland)	69–79	(Latvia) Ventspils

=== Game 6 ===
19 November 2014

Lokomotiv Kuban (Russia)	78–68	(Poland) Stelmet Zielona Góra

19 November 2014

PAOK (Greece)	74–79	(Turkey) Pınar Karşıyaka

19 November 2014

Budućnost VOLI (Montenegro)	87–69	(Latvia) Ventspils

=== Game 7 ===
25 November 2014

Stelmet Zielona Góra (Poland)	84–77	(Greece) PAOK

26 November 2014

Ventspils (Latvia)	60–69	(Russia) Lokomotiv Kuban

26 November 2014

Pınar Karşıyaka (Turkey)	86–78	(Montenegro) Budućnost VOLI

=== Game 8 ===
3 December 2014

PAOK (Greece)	54–68	(Russia) Lokomotiv Kuban

3 December 2014

Pınar Karşıyaka (Turkey)	71–67	(Latvia) Ventspils

3 December 2014

Budućnost VOLI (Montenegro)	100–85	(Poland) Stelmet Zielona Góra

=== Game 9 ===
10 December 2014

Lokomotiv Kuban (Russia)	79–76	(Montenegro) Budućnost VOLI

10 December 2014

Stelmet Zielona Góra (Poland)	71–69	(Turkey) Pınar Karşıyaka

10 December 2014

PAOK (Greece)	76–62	(Latvia) Ventspils

=== Game 10 ===
17 December 2014

Ventspils (Latvia)	51–58	(Poland) Stelmet Zielona Góra

17 December 2014

Budućnost VOLI (Montenegro)	76–81	(Greece) PAOK

17 December 2014

Pınar Karşıyaka (Turkey)	85–93	(Russia) Lokomotiv Kuban
