= Armani Moore =

American basketball player (born 1994)

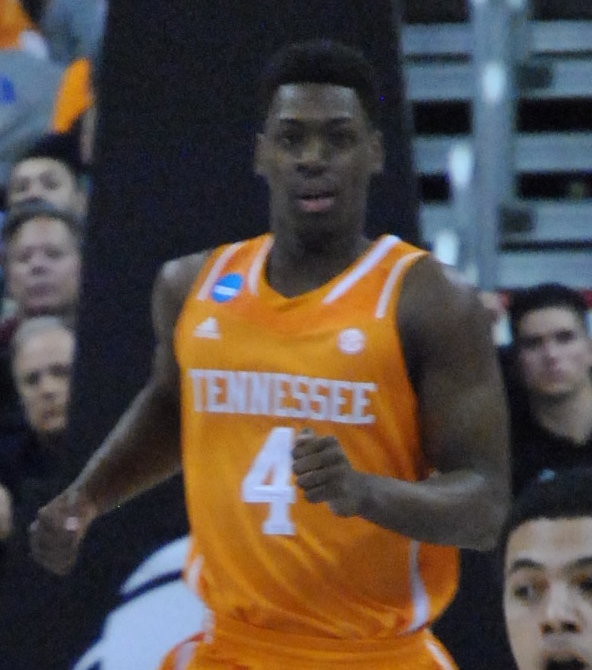
- Moore playing for Tennessee in the 2014 NCAA tournament

Personal information
- Born: March 25, 1994 (age 32) Swainsboro, Georgia
- Listed height: 6 ft 4 in (1.93 m)
- Listed weight: 217 lb (98 kg)

Career information
- High school: Mount Paran Christian (Kennesaw, Georgia)
- College: Tennessee (2012–2016)
- NBA draft: 2016: undrafted
- Position: Guard

Career history
- 2016–2018: Stelmet Zielona Góra
- 2018: EWE Baskets Oldenburg
- 2018–2019: New Zealand Breakers
- 2019: Eisbären Bremerhaven
- 2019: Arka Gdynia
- 2019–2020: EWE Baskets Oldenburg
- 2020: Start Lublin
- 2020–2021: Stal Ostrów Wielkopolski
- 2021–2022: Eisbären Bremerhaven
- 2022: Oldenburger TB
- 2023: Stjarnan

Career highlights
- Polish League champion (2017); Polish Cup winner (2017)

Armani T'Bori Moore (born March 25, 1994) is an American professional basketball player. He played college basketball at Tennessee. In 2017, he won the PLK championship and the Polish Cup.

== Early life and high school ==
Moore was born and raised in Swainsboro, Georgia and attended Swainsboro High School for three years. He transferred to Mount Paran Christian School in nearby Kennesaw, Georgia before his senior year. As a senior, Moore averaged 22 points, 9.3 rebounds, 3.9 blocks and 2.6 steals as Mount Paran went 24-6 and advance to the second round of the 2012 Georgia High School Association Class A playoffs. He committed to play for the University of Tennessee over offers from Mississippi and the College of Charleston.

== College career ==
Moore played four seasons for the Tennessee Volunteers. He started 16 games as a freshman and exclusively came off the bench as a sophomore before becoming a starter for the team going into his junior year. As a senior, he averaged 12.2 and 7.6 rebounds per game and was named honorable mention All-SEC. Over the course of his collegiate career, Moore scored 907 career points (7.1 PPG), 617 rebounds (4.8 RPG), and 131 blocked shots (1.02 BPG, 7th-most in school history) over 128 games (81 starts), which is tied for the 6th-most appearances in Tennessee history. He graduated from Tennessee with a degree in sports management.

== Professional career ==
After going unselected in the 2016 NBA draft, Moore participated in the NBA Summer League on the Indiana Pacers team but was not signed by the team.

=== Stelmet Zielona Góra ===
Moore signed with Stelmet Zielona Góra of the Polish Basketball League (PLK) on August 13, 2016. In his first season of professional basketball, Moore averaged 8.0 points and 4.0 rebounds in 44 PLK games as the team went on to win both the PLK league title and the 2017 Polish Cup. He returned to Stelmet for a second season and averaged 7.3 points and 4.1 rebounds in 14 PLK games and 6.1 points and 3.3 rebounds in nine Champions League games, as well as 14.5 points and 7.0 rebounds in two FIBA Europe Cup games, before leaving the team.

=== EWE Baskets Oldenburg ===
After leaving Stelmet, Moore signed with EWE Baskets Oldenburg of the German Basketball Bundesliga (BBL) on January 1, 2018. With EWE Moore averaged 7.4 points and 3.9 rebounds per game over 22 BBL games and 9.3 points and 5.9 rebounds in seven Champions League appearances.

=== New Zealand Breakers ===
Moore signed with the New Zealand Breakers of National Basketball League (NBL) on June 6, 2018. He averaged 7.1 points, 4.2 rebounds, 1.7 assists in 24 games (no starts) for the Breakers as the team finished sixth in the NBL.

=== Eisbären Bremerhaven ===
Moore returned to the Basketball Bundesliga after signing with Eisbären Bremerhaven for the remainder of the 2018–19 Bundesliga season on March 25, 2019. Moore averaged 12.2 points, 3.1 rebounds, and 1.8 assists in nine BBL games (seven starts) as Bremerhaven finished 17th in the league and was relegated to the German Second Division.

=== Arka Gdynia ===
Moore signed with Arka Gdynia of the Polish Basketball League on October 14, 2019. He averaged 7.3 points, 4.5 rebounds and 2.6 assists in eight PBL games and 7.7 points, 3.8 rebounds, 1.2 assists and 1.0 steals over seven EuroCup games before leaving the team during the December transfer window.

=== EWE Baskets Oldenburg (second stint) ===
Moore returned to EWE Baskets Oldenburg after signing with the team on December 18, 2019. He averaged 5.4 points and 3.6 rebounds per game in EuroCup.

=== Start Lublin ===
On July 20, 2020, he has signed with Start Lublin of the Polish Basketball League.

=== Stal Ostrów Wielkopolski ===
On November 23, 2020, he has signed with Stal Ostrów Wielkopolski of the Polish Basketball League (PLK).

=== Eisbären Bremerhaven (second stint) ===
On January 20, 2021, he has signed with Eisbären Bremerhaven of the German ProA.

=== Stjarnan ===
In January 2023, Moore signed with Stjarnan of the Icelandic Úrvalsdeild karla.

== Honours ==
=== Club ===
Zielona Góra

- Polish Basketball League: 2016–17
- Polish Cup: 2017
