= Marcus Lewis =

Marcus Lewis may refer to:

- Marcus Lewis (basketball, born 1986), basketball player in Israel, former NBA D-League player
- Marcus Lewis (basketball, born 1992), basketball player in Greece, former player in Canada and Finland
- Marcus Lewis (gridiron football) born 1996, American football player
