= PLK Best Coach =

Polish PLK award for coaching

The PLK Best Coach award is an annual award in the Polish PLK basketball league that is given to the best coach. A select group of press members can vote for the winner of the award.

== Winners ==
Season	Coach	Club	Ref.
1995–96	(Poland) Wojciech Krajewski	Anwil Włocławek	
2000–01	(Slovenia) Andrej Urlep	Śląsk Wrocław	
2003–04	(Poland) Eugeniusz Kijewski	Prokom Trefl Sopot	
2005–06	(Poland) Eugeniusz Kijewski (x2)	Prokom Trefl Sopot	
2006–07	(Slovenia) Sašo Filipovski	BOT Turów Zgorzelec	
2007–08	(Slovenia) Sašo Filipovski	PGE Turów Zgorzelec	
2008–09	Not awarded		
2009–10	(Serbia) Milija Bogicević	Polpharma Starogard Gdański	
2010–11	(Poland) Jacek Winnicki	PGE Turów Zgorzelec	
2011–12	(Serbia) Mihailo Uvalin	Zastal Zielona Góra	
2012–13	(Serbia) Mihailo Uvalin (x2)	Stelmet Zielona Góra	
2013–14	(Serbia) Miodrag Rajković	PGE Turów Zgorzelec	
2014–15	(Poland) Wojciech Kamiński	PGE Turów Zgorzelec	
2015–16	(Slovenia) Sašo Filipovski	Stelmet Zielona Góra	
2016–17	(Croatia) Igor Miličić	Anwil Włocławek	
2017–18	(Slovenia) Dejan Mihevc	Polski Cukier Toruń	
2018–19	(Poland) Przemysław Frasunkiewicz	Asseco Arka Gdynia	
2019–20	Not awarded		
2020–21	(Croatia) Žan Tabak	Zastal Zielona Góra	
2021–22	(Poland) Mantas Česnauskis	Grupa Sierleccy Czarni Słupsk	
2022–23	(Poland) Arkadiusz Miłoszewski	Wilki Morskie Szczecin	
2023–24	(Poland) Przemysław Frasunkiewicz (x2)	Anwil Włocławek	
2024–25	(Turkey) Selçuk Ernak	Anwil Włocławek	
2025–26	(Poland) Maciej Majcherek	Wilki Morskie Szczecin	
