= Montenegrin basketball clubs in European competitions =

Clubs from Montenegro are playing in European basketball competitions since the 1980s. Until 2006, they represented SFR Yugoslavia and FR Yugoslavia. Almost all European seasons by Montenegrin clubs are played by KK Budućnost. Exceptions are two single seasons in European competitions played by KK Lovćen Cetinje and KK Mornar Bar.

Most successful period was end of the 1990s and beginning of the 21st century. At that time, KK Budućnost played in the finish phases of EuroLeague. In that period, Budućnost often played games against greatest European basketball teams like FC Barcelona, Real Madrid, CSKA Moscow, Panathinaikos, Olympiacos, Maccabi Tel Aviv etc.

On season 2018-19, KK Budućnost made a comeback to EuroLeague. During that campaign, team from Podgorica made notable wins against CSKA Moscow, FC Barcelona and Real Madrid.

== Performances by season ==
Below is a list of games of all Montenegrin clubs in FIBA/ULEB competitions.

| Season | Competition | Round | Team 1 | Team 2 | Game 1 | Game 2 | Game 3 |
|---|---|---|---|---|---|---|---|
| 1986-87 | FIBA Korać Cup | Round 2 | (Turkey) Karşıyaka | KK Budućnost Podgorica | 71-82 | 82-85 | —N/a |
| 1986-87 | FIBA Korać Cup | Group D | KK Budućnost Podgorica | (Spain) Estudiantes | 94-108 | 88-99 | —N/a |
| 1986-87 | FIBA Korać Cup | Group D | (Italy) Juvecaserta | KK Budućnost Podgorica | 99-87 | 90-84 | —N/a |
| 1986-87 | FIBA Korać Cup | Group D | KK Budućnost Podgorica | (France) Challans | 87-84 | 97-114 | —N/a |
| 1996-97 | FIBA EuroCup | Group H | (Turkey) Türk Telekom | KK Budućnost Podgorica | 90-82 | 53-62 | —N/a |
| 1996-97 | FIBA EuroCup | Group H | KK Budućnost Podgorica | (Italy) Scaligera Basket Verona | 66-70 | 75-85 | —N/a |
| 1996-97 | FIBA EuroCup | Group H | KK Budućnost Podgorica | (Hungary) Körmend | 77-81 | 101-103 | —N/a |
| 1996-97 | FIBA EuroCup | Group H | KK Budućnost Podgorica | (England) London Towers | 103-96 | 58-71 | —N/a |
| 1996-97 | FIBA EuroCup | Group H | (Georgia (country)) Vita Tbilisi | KK Budućnost Podgorica | 104-86 | 56-93 | —N/a |
| 1997-98 | FIBA Korać Cup | Group D | KK Budućnost Podgorica | (Bulgaria) Slavia Sofia | 94-78 | 97-83 | —N/a |
| 1997-98 | FIBA Korać Cup | Group D | KK Budućnost Podgorica | (Turkey) Darüşşafaka | 69-64 | 59-68 | —N/a |
| 1997-98 | FIBA Korać Cup | Group D | (North Macedonia) Strumica | KK Budućnost Podgorica | 71-90 | 70-97 | —N/a |
| 1997-98 | FIBA Korać Cup | Round of 32 | KK Budućnost Podgorica | (Lithuania) Statyba | 83-69 | 61-69 | —N/a |
| 1997-98 | FIBA Korać Cup | Round of 16 | (Greece) Peristeri | KK Budućnost Podgorica | 76-57 | 60-78 | —N/a |
| 1998-99 | FIBA Saporta Cup | Group C | KK Budućnost Podgorica | (Israel) Hapoel Eilat | 75-80 | 78-86 | —N/a |
| 1998-99 | FIBA Saporta Cup | Group C | KK Budućnost Podgorica | (Latvia) Brocēni | 87-84 | 78-86 | —N/a |
| 1998-99 | FIBA Saporta Cup | Group C | (Spain) Valencia | KK Budućnost Podgorica | 78-68 | 78-71 | —N/a |
| 1998-99 | FIBA Saporta Cup | Group C | (Poland) Śląsk Wrocław | KK Budućnost Podgorica | 68-70 | 82-89 | —N/a |
| 1998-99 | FIBA Saporta Cup | Group C | (Austria) Sankt Pölten | KK Budućnost Podgorica | 66-69 | 69-95 | —N/a |
| 1998-99 | FIBA Saporta Cup | Round of 32 | (Greece) AEK Athens | KK Budućnost Podgorica | 66-61 | 63-74 | —N/a |
| 1998-99 | FIBA Saporta Cup | Round of 16 | KK Budućnost Podgorica | (Slovakia) Slovakofarma Pezinok | 86-68 | 85-81 | —N/a |
| 1998-99 | FIBA Saporta Cup | Quarterfinals | KK Budućnost Podgorica | (Turkey) Tofaş | 67-65 | 82-64 | —N/a |
| 1998-99 | FIBA Saporta Cup | Semifinals | (Italy) Benetton Treviso | KK Budućnost Podgorica | 76-60 | | —N/a |
| 1998-99 | FIBA Korać Cup | Group M | (Israel) Hapoel Galil Elyon | KK Lovćen Cetinje | 97-90 | 69-94 | —N/a |
| 1998-99 | FIBA Korać Cup | Group M | (Slovenia) Krka Novo Mesto | KK Lovćen Cetinje | 62-49 | 75-61 | —N/a |
| 1998-99 | FIBA Korać Cup | Group M | KK Lovćen Cetinje | (Italy) Virtus Roma | 63-71 | 67-92 | —N/a |
| 1999-00 | Euroleague | Group D | KK Budućnost Podgorica | (France) Pau-Orthez | 68-71 | 72-68 | —N/a |
| 1999-00 | Euroleague | Group D | (Croatia) Cibona Zagreb | KK Budućnost Podgorica | 69-63 | 90-95 | —N/a |
| 1999-00 | Euroleague | Group D | (Turkey) Anadolu Efes | KK Budućnost Podgorica | 73-67 | 80-86 | —N/a |
| 1999-00 | Euroleague | Group D | KK Budućnost Podgorica | (Italy) Fortitudo Bologna | 75-83 | 73-72 | —N/a |
| 1999-00 | Euroleague | Group D | (Spain) Caja San Fernando | KK Budućnost Podgorica | 75-73 | 65-88 | —N/a |
| 1999-00 | Euroleague | Stage 2 / Group G | KK Budućnost Podgorica | (Israel) Maccabi Tel Aviv | 59-67 | 60-74 | —N/a |
| 1999-00 | Euroleague | Stage 2 / Group G | (Greece) Olympiacos | KK Budućnost Podgorica | 89-61 | 70-82 | —N/a |
| 1999-00 | Euroleague | Stage 2 / Group G | KK Budućnost Podgorica | (France) ASVEL | 59-65 | 83-57 | —N/a |
| 1999-00 | Euroleague | Round of 16 | (Greece) Panathinaikos | KK Budućnost Podgorica | 65-59 | | —N/a |
| 1999-00 | Euroleague | Round of 16 | KK Budućnost Podgorica | (Greece) Panathinaikos | 77-64 | | —N/a |
| 1999-00 | Euroleague | Round of 16 | (Greece) Panathinaikos | KK Budućnost Podgorica | 78-61 | | —N/a |
| 2000-01 | Euroleague | Group D | KK Budućnost Podgorica | (Spain) FC Barcelona | 77-85 | 75-92 | —N/a |
| 2000-01 | Euroleague | Group D | (Germany) Skyliners Frankfurt | KK Budućnost Podgorica | 79-94 | 73-79 | —N/a |
| 2000-01 | Euroleague | Group D | (England) London Towers | KK Budućnost Podgorica | 88-95 | 83-101 | —N/a |
| 2000-01 | Euroleague | Group D | KK Budućnost Podgorica | (Greece) PAOK | 83-71 | 72-89 | —N/a |
| 2000-01 | Euroleague | Group D | (Italy) Scaligera Verona | KK Budućnost Podgorica | 86-91 | 73-77 | —N/a |
| 2000-01 | Euroleague | Round of 16 | (Spain) Real Madrid | KK Budućnost Podgorica | 91-63 | | —N/a |
| 2000-01 | Euroleague | Round of 16 | KK Budućnost Podgorica | (Spain) Real Madrid | 62-76 | | —N/a |
| 2001-02 | Euroleague | Group C | KK Budućnost Podgorica | (Spain) Real Madrid | 72-82 | 71-90 | —N/a |
| 2001-02 | Euroleague | Group C | (Italy) Fortitudo Bologna | KK Budućnost Podgorica | 109-79 | 70-86 | —N/a |
| 2001-02 | Euroleague | Group C | KK Budućnost Podgorica | (Russia) CSKA Moscow | 72-103 | 83-88 | —N/a |
| 2001-02 | Euroleague | Group C | (Greece) Panathinaikos | KK Budućnost Podgorica | 91-82 | 84-72 | —N/a |
| 2001-02 | Euroleague | Group C | (France) Pau-Orthez | KK Budućnost Podgorica | 87-90 | 79-77 | —N/a |
| 2001-02 | Euroleague | Group C | KK Budućnost Podgorica | (Slovenia) Krka Novo Mesto | 77-72 | 74-101 | —N/a |
| 2001-02 | Euroleague | Group C | (Croatia) Zadar | KK Budućnost Podgorica | 88-79 | 97-110 | —N/a |
| 2002-03 | Euroleague | Group B | (Greece) Panathinaikos | KK Budućnost Podgorica | 87-71 | 92-84 | —N/a |
| 2002-03 | Euroleague | Group B | KK Budućnost Podgorica | (Spain) Unicaja Málaga | 72-78 | 75-87 | —N/a |
| 2002-03 | Euroleague | Group B | (Slovenia) Olimpija Ljubljana | KK Budućnost Podgorica | 83-71 | 100-81 | —N/a |
| 2002-03 | Euroleague | Group B | KK Budućnost Podgorica | (Spain) Baskonia | 71-81 | 86-103 | —N/a |
| 2002-03 | Euroleague | Group B | KK Budućnost Podgorica | (Lithuania) Žalgiris | 106-102 | 85-101 | —N/a |
| 2002-03 | Euroleague | Group B | (Israel) Maccabi Tel Aviv | KK Budućnost Podgorica | 107-86 | 89-80 | —N/a |
| 2002-03 | Euroleague | Group B | KK Budućnost Podgorica | (Italy) Montepaschi Siena | 91-75 | 49-112 | —N/a |
| 2003-04 | ULEB Cup | Group E | KK Budućnost Podgorica | (Netherlands) Eiffel Towers | 103-100 | 91-88 | —N/a |
| 2003-04 | ULEB Cup | Group E | (Spain) Estudiantes | KK Budućnost Podgorica | 90-77 | 84-71 | —N/a |
| 2003-04 | ULEB Cup | Group E | (Greece) Makedonikos | KK Budućnost Podgorica | 87-75 | 74-85 | —N/a |
| 2003-04 | ULEB Cup | Group E | KK Budućnost Podgorica | (France) Le Mans | 85-81 | 67-78 | —N/a |
| 2003-04 | ULEB Cup | Group E | (Germany) Braunschweig | KK Budućnost Podgorica | 73-71 | 80-95 | —N/a |
| 2004-05 | ULEB Cup | Group A | (Germany) ALBA Berlin | KK Budućnost Podgorica | 86–70 | 85-95 | —N/a |
| 2004-05 | ULEB Cup | Group A | KK Budućnost Podgorica | (Belgium) Spirou Charleroi | 82-68 | 56-63 | —N/a |
| 2004-05 | ULEB Cup | Group A | KK Budućnost Podgorica | (Hungary) Debreceni Vadkakasok | 91-89 | 72-82 | —N/a |
| 2004-05 | ULEB Cup | Group A | (France) Gravelines-Dunkerque | KK Budućnost Podgorica | 108–75 | 89-81 | —N/a |
| 2004-05 | ULEB Cup | Group A | KK Budućnost Podgorica | (Greece) PAOK | 104–98 | 75-92 | —N/a |
| 2007-08 | ULEB Cup | Group E | KK Budućnost Podgorica | (Russia) Zenit St Petersburg | 66–75 | 65-75 | —N/a |
| 2007-08 | ULEB Cup | Group E | (Belgium) Antwerp Giants | KK Budućnost Podgorica | 76–79 | 65-76 | —N/a |
| 2007-08 | ULEB Cup | Group E | (Switzerland) Fribourg Olympic | KK Budućnost Podgorica | 73–82 | 63-74 | —N/a |
| 2007-08 | ULEB Cup | Group E | KK Budućnost Podgorica | (Israel) Hapoel Galil Elyon | 93–68 | 81-82 | —N/a |
| 2007-08 | ULEB Cup | Group E | (Austria) Swans Gmunden | KK Budućnost Podgorica | 72–79 | 60-86 | —N/a |
| 2007-08 | ULEB Cup | Round of 32 | (Serbia) Hemofarm Vršac | KK Budućnost Podgorica | 82–56 | 73-78 | —N/a |
| 2008-09 | Eurocup | Round 1 | (Turkey) Galatasaray | KK Budućnost Podgorica | 85–83 | 62–93 | —N/a |
| 2008-09 | Eurocup | Group H | (Czech Republic) Nymburk | KK Budućnost Podgorica | 75–70 | 66–63 | —N/a |
| 2008-09 | Eurocup | Group H | KK Budućnost Podgorica | (Spain) Bilbao | 65–67 | 66–69 | —N/a |
| 2008-09 | Eurocup | Group H | KK Budućnost Podgorica | (Serbia) Hemofarm Vršac | 70–59 | 85-89 | —N/a |
| 2009-10 | Eurocup | Round 1 | (Germany) Brose Bamberg | KK Budućnost Podgorica | 64–61 | 65–67 | —N/a |
| 2010-11 | Euroleague | Round 1Q | (France) ASVEL | KK Budućnost Podgorica | 64–69 | 84–76 | —N/a |
| 2010-11 | Eurocup | Group C | (Lithuania) Šiauliai | KK Budućnost Podgorica | 76–97 | 66–83 | —N/a |
| 2010-11 | Eurocup | Group C | KK Budućnost Podgorica | (Spain) Gran Canaria | 66–90 | 60–62 | —N/a |
| 2010-11 | Eurocup | Group C | (Ukraine) Budivelnyk Kyiv | KK Budućnost Podgorica | 70–56 | 54–69 | —N/a |
| 2011-12 | Euroleague | Round 1Q | (Lithuania) Lietuvos Rytas | KK Budućnost Podgorica | 83–64 | | —N/a |
| 2011-12 | Eurocup | Group H | KK Budućnost Podgorica | (Poland) Turów Zgorzelec | 75–50 | 78–73 | —N/a |
| 2011-12 | Eurocup | Group H | (Germany) ALBA Berlin | KK Budućnost Podgorica | 88–68 | 72–57 | —N/a |
| 2011-12 | Eurocup | Group H | (Belgium) Dexia Mons | KK Budućnost Podgorica | 66–53 | 78–85 | —N/a |
| 2011-12 | Eurocup | Stage 2 / Group K | KK Budućnost Podgorica | (Russia) Spartak St Petersburg | 57–65 | 64–70 | —N/a |
| 2011-12 | Eurocup | Stage 2 / Group K | (Slovenia) Krka Novo Mesto | KK Budućnost Podgorica | 64–69 | 58–63 | —N/a |
| 2011-12 | Eurocup | Stage 2 / Group K | (Turkey) Banvit | KK Budućnost Podgorica | 68–61 | 73–83 | —N/a |
| 2011-12 | Eurocup | Quarterfinals | (Spain) Valencia | KK Budućnost Podgorica | 71–75 | 85–63 | —N/a |
| 2012-13 | Eurocup | Group B | (Spain) Bilbao | KK Budućnost Podgorica | 85–78 | 68–66 | —N/a |
| 2012-13 | Eurocup | Group B | KK Budućnost Podgorica | (Bulgaria) Academic Sofia | 75–72 | 74–55 | —N/a |
| 2012-13 | Eurocup | Group B | (Belgium) Charleroi | KK Budućnost Podgorica | 53–66 | 55–59 | —N/a |
| 2012-13 | Eurocup | Stage 2 | KK Budućnost Podgorica | (Russia) Zenit St Petersburg | 90–69 | 66–76 | —N/a |
| 2012-13 | Eurocup | Stage 2 | (Turkey) Banvit | KK Budućnost Podgorica | 89–80 | 50–66 | —N/a |
| 2012-13 | Eurocup | Stage 2 | (Ukraine) Budivelnyk Kyiv | KK Budućnost Podgorica | 75–79 | 77–75 | —N/a |
| 2012-13 | Eurocup | Quarterfinals | (Russia) Lokomotiv Kuban | KK Budućnost Podgorica | 72–54 | 90–65 | —N/a |
| 2013-14 | Eurocup | Group F | (Greece) PAOK | KK Budućnost Podgorica | 85–84 | 75–69 | —N/a |
| 2013-14 | Eurocup | Group F | KK Budućnost Podgorica | (Turkey) Ankara | 80–73 | 75–81 | —N/a |
| 2013-14 | Eurocup | Group F | (Russia) Nizhny Novgorod | KK Budućnost Podgorica | 83–62 | 91–88 | —N/a |
| 2013-14 | Eurocup | Group F | KK Budućnost Podgorica | (Hungary) Alba Fehérvár | 67–61 | 80–82 | —N/a |
| 2013-14 | Eurocup | Group F | (Ukraine) Khimik Yuzhne | KK Budućnost Podgorica | 84–76 | 87–91 | —N/a |
| 2014-15 | Eurocup | Group F | (Latvia) Ventspils | KK Budućnost Podgorica | 82–75 | 69–87 | —N/a |
| 2014-15 | Eurocup | Group F | KK Budućnost Podgorica | (Turkey) Karşıyaka | 79–82 | 78–86 | —N/a |
| 2014-15 | Eurocup | Group F | (Poland) Zielona Góra | KK Budućnost Podgorica | 76–90 | 85–100 | —N/a |
| 2014-15 | Eurocup | Group F | KK Budućnost Podgorica | (Russia) Lokomotiv Kuban | 63–77 | 76–79 | —N/a |
| 2014-15 | Eurocup | Group F | (Greece) PAOK | KK Budućnost Podgorica | 80–60 | 81–76 | —N/a |
| 2014-15 | Eurocup | Stage 2 / Group H | (Italy) Dinamo Sassari | KK Budućnost Podgorica | 87–70 | 86–93 | —N/a |
| 2014-15 | Eurocup | Stage 2 / Group H | KK Budućnost Podgorica | (Spain) Gran Canaria | 83–88 | 69–92 | —N/a |
| 2014-15 | Eurocup | Stage 2 / Group H | (Turkey) Banvit | KK Budućnost Podgorica | 87–74 | 74–68 | —N/a |
| 2015-16 | Eurocup | Group D | KK Budućnost Podgorica | (Turkey) Banvit | 83–70 | 68–76 | —N/a |
| 2015-16 | Eurocup | Group D | (Greece) Aris | KK Budućnost Podgorica | 75–57 | 56–75 | —N/a |
| 2015-16 | Eurocup | Group D | (Turkey) Trabzonspor | KK Budućnost Podgorica | 75–71 | 82–79 | —N/a |
| 2015-16 | Eurocup | Group D | KK Budućnost Podgorica | (Russia) UNICS | 73–63 | 77–91 | —N/a |
| 2015-16 | Eurocup | Group D | (Romania) Steaua București | KK Budućnost Podgorica | 81–75 | 56–89 | —N/a |
| 2016-17 | Eurocup | Group C | (Spain) Murcia | KK Budućnost Podgorica | 86–77 | 86–75 | —N/a |
| 2016-17 | Eurocup | Group C | KK Budućnost Podgorica | (Russia) Zenit St Petersburg | 95–97 | 79–84 | —N/a |
| 2016-17 | Eurocup | Group C | (Germany) Bayern Munich | KK Budućnost Podgorica | 80–66 | 68–44 | —N/a |
| 2016-17 | Eurocup | Group C | KK Budućnost Podgorica | (Spain) Unicaja Málaga | 62–86 | 75–93 | —N/a |
| 2016-17 | FIBA Champions League | Round 1Q | (Bosnia and Herzegovina) Igokea | KK Mornar Bar | 71–69 | 60–83 | —N/a |
| 2016-17 | FIBA Champions League | Group D | KK Mornar Bar | (Belgium) Oostende | 74–72 | 60–80 | —N/a |
| 2016-17 | FIBA Champions League | Group D | (Spain) Tenerife | KK Mornar Bar | 103–57 | 89–72 | —N/a |
| 2016-17 | FIBA Champions League | Group D | KK Mornar Bar | (Serbia) Mega Leks | 87–85 | 53–60 | —N/a |
| 2016-17 | FIBA Champions League | Group D | (Croatia) Cibona Zagreb | KK Mornar Bar | 90–72 | 92–81 | —N/a |
| 2016-17 | FIBA Champions League | Group D | KK Mornar Bar | (Italy) Avellino | 67–76 | 60–53 | —N/a |
| 2016-17 | FIBA Champions League | Group D | KK Mornar Bar | (Lithuania) Juventus Utena | 73–75 | 74–82 | —N/a |
| 2016-17 | FIBA Champions League | Group D | (France) SIG Strasbourg | KK Mornar Bar | 93–62 | 83–70 | —N/a |
| 2017-18 | Eurocup | Group B | (Germany) Bayern Munich | KK Budućnost Podgorica | 85–82 | 76–60 | —N/a |
| 2017-18 | Eurocup | Group B | KK Budućnost Podgorica | (Turkey) Galatasaray | 87–78 | 61–82 | —N/a |
| 2017-18 | Eurocup | Group B | (Italy) Reggio Emilia | KK Budućnost Podgorica | 77–71 | 74–82 | —N/a |
| 2017-18 | Eurocup | Group B | KK Budućnost Podgorica | (Lithuania) Lietkabelis | 76–62 | 79–86 | —N/a |
| 2017-18 | Eurocup | Group B | (Israel) Hapoel Jerusalem | KK Budućnost Podgorica | 81–86 | 75–92 | —N/a |
| 2017-18 | Eurocup | Group G | KK Budućnost Podgorica | (Russia) Lokomotiv Kuban | 62–68 | 66–77 | —N/a |
| 2017-18 | Eurocup | Group G | (Italy) Trento | KK Budućnost Podgorica | 105–106 | 66–79 | —N/a |
| 2017-18 | Eurocup | Group G | KK Budućnost Podgorica | (Croatia) Cedevita | 84–52 | 78–75 | —N/a |
| 2017-18 | Eurocup | Quarterfinals | (Turkey) Darüşşafaka | KK Budućnost Podgorica | 57–54 | 78–71 | —N/a |
| 2017-18 | FIBA Champions League | Round 2Q | (Russia) Avtodor Saratov | KK Mornar Bar | 88–70 | 70–62 | —N/a |
| 2017-18 | FIBA Europe Cup | Group C | KK Mornar Bar | (Finland) Kataja | 76–71 | 76–81 | —N/a |
| 2017-18 | FIBA Europe Cup | Group C | (Portugal) Porto | KK Mornar Bar | 68–55 | 70–81 | —N/a |
| 2017-18 | FIBA Europe Cup | Group C | KK Mornar Bar | (Austria) Kapfenberg Bulls | 74–58 | 75–69 | —N/a |
| 2017-18 | FIBA Europe Cup | Group K | KK Mornar Bar | (Denmark) Bakken Bears | 76–87 | 92–93 | —N/a |
| 2017-18 | FIBA Europe Cup | Group K | (Belarus) Tsmoki Minsk | KK Mornar Bar | 84–45 | 76–83 | —N/a |
| 2017-18 | FIBA Europe Cup | Group K | KK Mornar Bar | (Hungary) Szolnoki Olaj | 73–68 | 92–89 | —N/a |
| 2017-18 | FIBA Europe Cup | Round of 16 | (Belgium) Oostende | KK Mornar Bar | 84–71 | 63–90 | —N/a |
| 2017-18 | FIBA Europe Cup | Quarterfinals | KK Mornar Bar | (Netherlands) Donar | 73–67 | 74–101 | —N/a |
| 2018-19 | Euroleague | Regular season | KK Budućnost Podgorica | (Italy) Olimpia Milano | 71–82 | 94–111 | —N/a |
| 2018-19 | Euroleague | Regular season | (Turkey) Darüşşafaka | KK Budućnost Podgorica | 71–63 | 74–75 | —N/a |
| 2018-19 | Euroleague | Regular season | KK Budućnost Podgorica | (Israel) Maccabi Tel Aviv | 68–78 | 76–81 | —N/a |
| 2018-19 | Euroleague | Regular season | (Spain) Real Madrid | KK Budućnost Podgorica | 89–55 | 60–73 | —N/a |
| 2018-19 | Euroleague | Regular season | KK Budućnost Podgorica | (Greece) Panathinaikos | 67–72 | 67–87 | —N/a |
| 2018-19 | Euroleague | Regular season | KK Budućnost Podgorica | (Lithuania) Žalgiris | 60–72 | 76–84 | —N/a |
| 2018-19 | Euroleague | Regular season | KK Budućnost Podgorica | (Spain) Baskonia | 99–84 | 62–82 | —N/a |
| 2018-19 | Euroleague | Regular season | (Russia) BC Khimki | KK Budućnost Podgorica | 85–69 | 98–90 | —N/a |
| 2018-19 | Euroleague | Regular season | KK Budućnost Podgorica | (Russia) CSKA Moscow | 93–92 | 69–99 | —N/a |
| 2018-19 | Euroleague | Regular season | (Greece) Olympiacos | KK Budućnost Podgorica | 92–70 | 89–76 | —N/a |
| 2018-19 | Euroleague | Regular season | KK Budućnost Podgorica | (Spain) FC Barcelona | 67–64 | 83–95 | —N/a |
| 2018-19 | Euroleague | Regular season | (Spain) Gran Canaria | KK Budućnost Podgorica | 95–85 | 70–75 | —N/a |
| 2018-19 | Euroleague | Regular season | (Turkey) Anadolu Efes | KK Budućnost Podgorica | 106–68 | 91–84 | —N/a |
| 2018-19 | Euroleague | Regular season | KK Budućnost Podgorica | (Turkey) Fenerbahçe | 65–89 | 67–76 | —N/a |
| 2018-19 | Euroleague | Regular season | (Germany) Bayern Munich | KK Budućnost Podgorica | 93–88 | 89–75 | —N/a |
| 2018-19 | Eurocup | Group D | KK Mornar Bar | (Russia) UNICS | 74–97 | 73–90 | —N/a |
| 2018-19 | Eurocup | Group D | (Spain) Unicaja Málaga | KK Mornar Bar | 111–76 | 96–85 | —N/a |
| 2018-19 | Eurocup | Group D | KK Mornar Bar | (Germany) Skyliners Frankfurt | 83–87 | 75–98 | —N/a |
| 2018-19 | Eurocup | Group D | (Lithuania) Lietuvos Rytas | KK Mornar Bar | 91–67 | 92–69 | —N/a |
| 2018-19 | Eurocup | Group D | KK Mornar Bar | (Italy) Torino | 86–83 | 84–80 | —N/a |
| 2019-20 | Eurocup | Group D | KK Budućnost Podgorica | (Spain) Unicaja Málaga | 81–82 | 70–83 | —N/a |
| 2019-20 | Eurocup | Group D | (Turkey) Galatasaray | KK Budućnost Podgorica | 84–83 | 78–94 | —N/a |
| 2019-20 | Eurocup | Group D | KK Budućnost Podgorica | (Germany) Oldenburg | 83–85 | 99–102 | —N/a |
| 2019-20 | Eurocup | Group D | (Italy) Trento | KK Budućnost Podgorica | 69–76 | 77–68 | —N/a |
| 2019-20 | Eurocup | Group D | KK Budućnost Podgorica | (Poland) Arka Gdynia | 59–62 | 78–61 | —N/a |
| 2019-20 | FIBA Champions League | Round 2Q | (Portugal) Benfica | KK Mornar Bar | 68–96 | 82–71 | —N/a |
| 2019-20 | FIBA Champions League | Group C | KK Mornar Bar | (Czech Republic) Nymburk | 66–98 | 74–91 | —N/a |
| 2019-20 | FIBA Champions League | Group C | (Spain) Tenerife | KK Mornar Bar | 91–61 | 81–74 | —N/a |
| 2019-20 | FIBA Champions League | Group C | KK Mornar Bar | (Russia) Nizhny Novgorod | 87–66 | 69–89 | —N/a |
| 2019-20 | FIBA Champions League | Group C | (Greece) Peristeri | KK Mornar Bar | 72–67 | 73–65 | —N/a |
| 2019-20 | FIBA Champions League | Group C | KK Mornar Bar | (Germany) Brose Bamberg | 77–73 | 76–81 | —N/a |
| 2019-20 | FIBA Champions League | Group C | (Turkey) Gaziantep | KK Mornar Bar | 86–79 | 77–84 | —N/a |
| 2019-20 | FIBA Champions League | Group C | KK Mornar Bar | (Latvia) VEF Rīga | 106–99 | 74–80 | —N/a |
| 2020–21 | Eurocup | Group B | KK Budućnost Podgorica | (Italy) Germani Brescia | 93–81 | 75–66 | —N/a |
| 2020–21 | Eurocup | Group B | (France) Metropolitans 92 | KK Budućnost Podgorica | 89–83 | 71–73 | —N/a |
| 2020–21 | Eurocup | Group B | (Spain) Unicaja | KK Budućnost Podgorica | 87–91 | 66–90 | —N/a |
| 2020–21 | Eurocup | Group B | KK Budućnost Podgorica | (Germany) ratiopharm Ulm | 73–68 | 77–73 | —N/a |
| 2020–21 | Eurocup | Group B | (Montenegro) Mornar | KK Budućnost Podgorica | 82–85 | 78–84 | —N/a |
| 2020–21 | Eurocup | Group B | (Germany) ratiopharm Ulm | KK Mornar Bar | 76–84 | 66–82 | —N/a |
| 2020–21 | Eurocup | Group B | KK Mornar Bar | (Spain) Unicaja | 90–80 | 72–98 | —N/a |
| 2020–21 | Eurocup | Group B | KK Mornar Bar | (Italy) Germani Brescia | 95–76 | 75–77 | —N/a |
| 2020–21 | Eurocup | Group B | (France) Metropolitans 92 | KK Mornar Bar | 65–78 | 89–78 | —N/a |
| 2020–21 | Eurocup | Group B | KK Mornar Bar | (Montenegro) Budućnost VOLI | 85–82 | 84–78 | —N/a |
| 2020–21 | Eurocup | Group G | KK Budućnost Podgorica | (France) JL Bourg | 108–80 | 92–89 | —N/a |
| 2020–21 | Eurocup | Group G | (Slovenia) Cedevita Olimpija | KK Budućnost Podgorica | 71–74 | 79–66 | —N/a |
| 2020–21 | Eurocup | Group G | (Italy) Virtus Segafredo Bologna | KK Budućnost Podgorica | 65–87 | 89–99 | —N/a |
| 2020–21 | Eurocup | Group H | (Spain) Herbalife Gran Canaria | KK Mornar Bar | 102–100 | 81–85 | —N/a |
| 2020–21 | Eurocup | Group H | KK Mornar Bar | (Spain) MoraBanc Andorra | 71–74 | 61–89 | —N/a |
| 2020–21 | Eurocup | Group H | KK Mornar Bar | (Russia) UNICS | 70–87 | 61–86 | —N/a |
| 2020–21 | Eurocup | Quarterfinals | (France) AS Monaco | KK Budućnost Podgorica | 77–76 | 64–74 | 87–90 |
| 2021–22 | Eurocup | Group B | (Germany) ratiopharm Ulm | KK Budućnost Podgorica | 86–79 | 68–89 | —N/a |
| 2021–22 | Eurocup | Group B | KK Budućnost Podgorica | (Spain) Valencia Basket | 71–70 | 76–103 | —N/a |
| 2021–22 | Eurocup | Group B | KK Budućnost Podgorica | (Italy) Virtus Segafredo Bologna | 86–82 | 68–62 | —N/a |
| 2021–22 | Eurocup | Group B | (Italy) Umana Reyer Venezia | KK Budućnost Podgorica | 67–72 | 72–82 | —N/a |
| 2021–22 | Eurocup | Group B | KK Budućnost Podgorica | (Slovenia) Cedevita Olimpija | 91–60 | 78–92 | —N/a |
| 2021–22 | Eurocup | Group B | (Greece) Promitheas | KK Budućnost Podgorica | 89–60 | 90–77 | —N/a |
| 2021–22 | Eurocup | Group B | KK Budućnost Podgorica | (Spain) Gran Canaria | 76–83 | 64–84 | —N/a |
| 2021–22 | Eurocup | Group B | (France) Mincidelice JL Bourg | KK Budućnost Podgorica | 86–82 | 73–75 | —N/a |
| 2021–22 | Eurocup | Group B | KK Budućnost Podgorica | (Turkey) Frutti Extra Bursaspor | 83–82 | 89–86 | —N/a |
| 2021–22 | Eurocup | Eighthfinals | (Spain) MoraBanc Andorra | KK Budućnost Podgorica | 64–74 | | —N/a |
| 2021–22 | FIBA Champions League | Qualification Group C | KK Mornar Bar | (Estonia) Kalev/Cramo | 89–104 | | —N/a |
| 2021–22 | FIBA Europe Cup | Group E | (Turkey) Bahçeşehir Koleji | KK Mornar Bar | 68–75 | 86–95 | —N/a |
| 2021–22 | FIBA Europe Cup | Group E | KK Mornar Bar | (Netherlands) ZZ Leiden | 87–74 | 73–78 | —N/a |
| 2021–22 | FIBA Europe Cup | Group E | KK Mornar Bar | (Greece) Iraklis | 88–65 | 82–83 | —N/a |
| 2022–23 | Eurocup | Group B | KK Budućnost Podgorica | (Germany) Hamburg Towers | 66–73 | 87–59 | —N/a |
| 2022–23 | Eurocup | Group B | (Poland) Śląsk Wrocław | KK Budućnost Podgorica | 98–58 | 82–71 | —N/a |
| 2022–23 | Eurocup | Group B | KK Budućnost Podgorica | (Greece) Promitheas | 95–89 | 72–81 | —N/a |
| 2022–23 | Eurocup | Group B | (United Kingdom) London Lions | KK Budućnost Podgorica | 87–78 | 78–68 | —N/a |
| 2022–23 | Eurocup | Group B | KK Budućnost Podgorica | (France) Paris Basketball | 74–77 | 87–103 | —N/a |
| 2022–23 | Eurocup | Group B | (Israel) Hapoel Tel Aviv | KK Budućnost Podgorica | 70–64 | 89–79 | —N/a |
| 2022–23 | Eurocup | Group B | KK Budućnost Podgorica | (Italy) Dolomiti Energia Trento | 73–58 | 76–79 | —N/a |
| 2022–23 | Eurocup | Group B | (Spain) Gran Canaria | KK Budućnost Podgorica | 71–79 | 69–94 | —N/a |
| 2022–23 | Eurocup | Group B | KK Budućnost Podgorica | (Turkey) Türk Telekom | 71–84 | 72–77 | —N/a |
| 2022–23 | Eurocup | Eighthfinals | (Germany) ratiopharm Ulm | KK Budućnost Podgorica | 83–92 | | —N/a |
| 2023–24 | Eurocup | Group B | KK Budućnost Podgorica | (Lithuania) 7bet-Lietkabelis | 76–65 | 83–81 | —N/a |
| 2023–24 | Eurocup | Group B | (Turkey) Türk Telekom | KK Budućnost Podgorica | 77–79 | 73–96 | —N/a |
| 2023–24 | Eurocup | Group B | KK Budućnost Podgorica | (Poland) Śląsk Wrocław | 103–89 | 80–79 | —N/a |
| 2023–24 | Eurocup | Group B | (Romania) U-BT Cluj-Napoca | KK Budućnost Podgorica | 74–89 | 77–79 | —N/a |
| 2023–24 | Eurocup | Group B | (France) Mincidelice JL Bourg | KK Budućnost Podgorica | 73–78 | 78–74 | —N/a |
| 2023–24 | Eurocup | Group B | KK Budućnost Podgorica | (Greece) Aris Midea | 63–65 | 75–76 | —N/a |
| 2023–24 | Eurocup | Group B | (Germany) ratiopharm Ulm | KK Budućnost Podgorica | 67–84 | 80–84 | —N/a |
| 2023–24 | Eurocup | Group B | KK Budućnost Podgorica | (Italy) Dolomiti Energia Trento | 98–96 | 97–78 | —N/a |
| 2023–24 | Eurocup | Group B | (Spain) Gran Canaria | KK Budućnost Podgorica | 70–97 | 90–77 | —N/a |
| 2023–24 | FIBA Champions League | Qualification Group III | KK Mornar Bar | (Spain) Obradoiro | 56–90 | | —N/a |
| 2023–24 | FIBA Europe Cup | Group D | KK Mornar Bar | (Azerbaijan) Sabah | 80–75 | 74–81 | —N/a |
| 2023–24 | FIBA Europe Cup | Group D | (Czech Republic) ERA Nymburk | KK Mornar Bar | 62–78 | 76–97 | —N/a |
| 2023–24 | FIBA Europe Cup | Group D | KK Mornar Bar | (Turkey) Bahçeşehir Koleji | 71–78 | 68–103 | —N/a |
| 2024–25 | Eurocup | Group A | (Turkey) Beşiktaş Fibabanka | KK Budućnost Podgorica | 76–94 | 88–90 | —N/a |
| 2024–25 | Eurocup | Group A | KK Budućnost Podgorica | (Spain) Gran Canaria | 86–89 | 71–82 | —N/a |
| 2024–25 | Eurocup | Group A | (Italy) Dolomiti Energia Trento | KK Budućnost Podgorica | 85–64 | 110–108 | —N/a |
| 2024–25 | Eurocup | Group A | KK Budućnost Podgorica | (Poland) Trefl Sopot | 92–83 | 81–69 | —N/a |
| 2024–25 | Eurocup | Group A | KK Budućnost Podgorica | (Turkey) Bahçeşehir Koleji | 75–92 | 93–95 | —N/a |
| 2024–25 | Eurocup | Group A | (Israel) Hapoel Shlomo Tel Aviv | KK Budućnost Podgorica | 72–92 | 84–83 | —N/a |
| 2024–25 | Eurocup | Group A | KK Budućnost Podgorica | (Germany) ratiopharm Ulm | 105–100 | 85–82 | —N/a |
| 2024–25 | Eurocup | Group A | (Spain) Joventut Badalona | KK Budućnost Podgorica | 72–78 | 107–75 | —N/a |
| 2024–25 | Eurocup | Group A | KK Budućnost Podgorica | (Lithuania) Wolves Twinsbet | 104–77 | 82–91 | —N/a |
| 2024–25 | Eurocup | Eighthfinals | (Turkey) Türk Telekom | KK Budućnost Podgorica | 73–93 | | —N/a |
| 2025–26 | Eurocup | Group B | (United Kingdom) London Lions | KK Budućnost Podgorica | 86–59 | 94–63 | —N/a |
| 2025–26 | Eurocup | Group B | KK Budućnost Podgorica | (Italy) Dolomiti Energia Trento | 96–107 | 90–91 | —N/a |
| 2025–26 | Eurocup | Group B | (Turkey) Türk Telekom | KK Budućnost Podgorica | 72–79 | 91–81 | —N/a |
| 2025–26 | Eurocup | Group B | KK Budućnost Podgorica | (Greece) Panionios Cosmorama Travel | 91–63 | 85–97 | —N/a |
| 2025–26 | Eurocup | Group B | (Lithuania) Lietkabelis | KK Budućnost Podgorica | 98–91 | 95–81 | —N/a |
| 2025–26 | Eurocup | Group B | KK Budućnost Podgorica | (Turkey) Beşiktaş Gain | 82–79 | 74–96 | —N/a |
| 2025–26 | Eurocup | Group B | (Germany) Niners Chemnitz | KK Budućnost Podgorica | 84–71 | 97–81 | —N/a |
| 2025–26 | Eurocup | Group B | KK Budućnost Podgorica | (Germany) ratiopharm Ulm | 101–71 | 103–90 | —N/a |
| 2025–26 | Eurocup | Group B | (France) Cosea JL Bourg | KK Budućnost Podgorica | 73–88 | 96–84 | —N/a |
| 2025–26 | Eurocup | Eighthfinals | KK Budućnost Podgorica | (Romania) U-BT Cluj-Napoca | 82–100 | | —N/a |
| 2025–26 | Eurocup | Qualification Group 2 | (Greece) PAOK mateco | KK Studentski centar | 67–79 | | —N/a |

== Performances by clubs ==
During the overall history, three different Montenegrin clubs played in FIBA/ULEB competitions. KK Budućnost played in every competition (Euroleague, Eurocup/ULEB Cup, Saporta Cup/FIBA EuroCup, FIBA Korać Cup), while KK Lovćen played one season in FIBA Korać Cup, and KK Mornar in Basketball Champions League.

| Team | Seasons | First | Last | G | W | L |
|---|---|---|---|---|---|---|
| KK Budućnost Podgorica | 23 | 1986-87 | 2019-20 | 285 | 107 | 178 |
| KK Mornar Bar | 4 | 2016-17 | 2019-20 | 58 | 19 | 39 |
| KK Lovćen Cetinje | 1 | 1998-99 | 1998-99 | 6 | 1 | 5 |

As of the end of FIBA/ULEB competitions 2019–20 season.

== Scores by competitions ==
During the history, Montenegrin basketball clubs played in Euroleague, Eurocup/ULEB Cup, Saporta Cup/FIBA EuroCup and FIBA Korać Cup.
Below is the list of performances of Montenegrin clubs in every single European basketball competition.

| Competition | G | W | L |
|---|---|---|---|
| Euroleague | 91 | 28 | 63 |
| Eurocup/ULEB Cup | 159 | 58 | 101 |
| FIBA Champions League | 32 | 8 | 24 |
| Saporta Cup/FIBA EuroCup | 27 | 13 | 14 |
| FIBA Europe Cup | 16 | 9 | 7 |
| FIBA Korać Cup | 24 | 11 | 13 |
| OVERALL | 349 | 127 | 222 |

As of the end of FIBA/ULEB competitions 2019–20 season.

== Scores by opponents' countries ==
Below is the list of performances of Montenegrin clubs against opponents in FIBA/ULEB competitions by their countries (basketball federations).

| Opponents' country | G | W | L |
|---|---|---|---|
| Austria | 6 | 6 | 0 |
| Belarus | 2 | 1 | 1 |
| Belgium | 12 | 8 | 4 |
| Bosnia and Herzegovina | 2 | 1 | 1 |
| Bulgaria | 4 | 4 | 0 |
| Croatia | 8 | 4 | 4 |
| Czech Republic | 4 | 0 | 4 |
| Denmark | 2 | 0 | 2 |
| England | 4 | 3 | 1 |
| Finland | 2 | 1 | 1 |
| France | 16 | 4 | 12 |
| Georgia | 2 | 1 | 1 |
| Germany | 22 | 6 | 16 |
| Greece | 31 | 8 | 23 |
| Hungary | 8 | 4 | 4 |
| Israel | 14 | 3 | 11 |
| Italy | 29 | 13 | 16 |
| Latvia | 6 | 3 | 3 |
| Lithuania | 15 | 5 | 10 |
| Macedonia | 2 | 2 | 0 |
| Netherlands | 4 | 3 | 1 |
| Portugal | 4 | 2 | 2 |
| Poland | 8 | 6 | 2 |
| Romania | 2 | 1 | 1 |
| Russia | 30 | 4 | 26 |
| Serbia | 6 | 3 | 3 |
| Slovakia | 2 | 2 | 0 |
| Slovenia | 8 | 2 | 6 |
| Spain | 48 | 6 | 42 |
| Switzerland | 2 | 2 | 0 |
| Turkey | 40 | 17 | 23 |

As of the end of FIBA/ULEB competitions 2019–20 season.

== See also ==
- Montenegrin Basketball League
- Second Basketball League
- Montenegrin Basketball Cup
