= Mihailo Uvalin =

Serbian basketball head coach

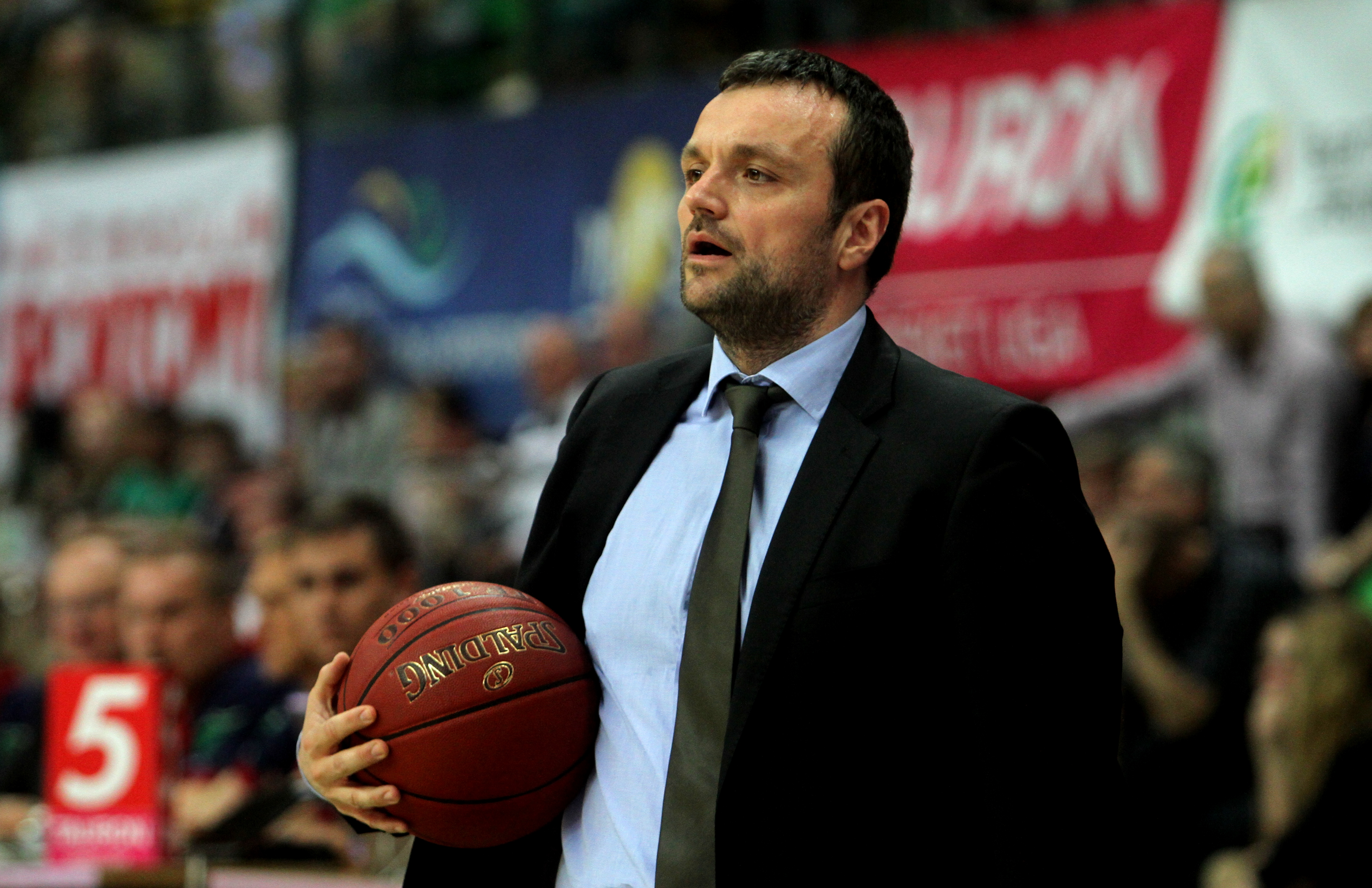
- Uvalin coaching Stelmet Zielona Góra in May 2014.

Free agent
- Position: Head coach

Personal information
- Born: 12 August 1971 (age 55) SFR Yugoslavia
- Coaching career: 1989–present

Career history

Coaching
- 1989–1993: Crvena zvezda (youth)
- 1993–1996: Crvena zvezda (assistant)
- 1995: Crvena zvezda (interim)
- 1996–1997: Crvena zvezda (youth)
- 1997–1999: Žito Vardar
- 1999–2000: TIDSG Innsbruck
- 2001–2002: Crvena zvezda (youth)
- 2002–2003: Crvena zvezda (assistant)
- 2004–2005: Damme
- 2005–2006: Oostende
- 2007: Mega Vizura
- 2007–2008: Polpak Świecie
- 2008–2009: Mega Hypo Leasing
- 2009–2010: Politekhnika-Halychyna
- 2010–2011: Crvena zvezda
- 2011–2014: Stelmet Zielona Góra
- 2015: Wilki Morskie Szczecin
- 2015: Śląsk Wrocław
- 2017: Yeşilgiresun Belediye
- 2021–2022: HydroTruck Radom

Mihailo Uvalin (Serbian Cyrillic: Михаило Увалин; born 12 August 1971) is a Serbian professional basketball coach.

== Coaching career ==
During his career Uvalin has been a head coach for Žito Vardar, Innsbruck, Damme, Oostende, Mega Basket, Polpak Świecie, Politekhnika-Halychyna, Crvena zvezda, Stelmet Zielona Góra, Wilki Morskie Szczecin, Śląsk Wrocław, Yeşilgiresun Belediye, and HydroTruck Radom.

== Career achievements and awards ==
As head coach

- Belgian League champion: 1 (with Telenet Oostende: 2005–06)
- Polish League champion: 1 (with Stelmet Zielona Góra: 2012–13)
- Belgian Supercup winner: 1 (with Telenet Oostende: 2006)

Individual

- PLK Best Coach (2) – 2011–12, 2012–13

== See also ==
- List of KK Crvena zvezda head coaches
