= Sašo Filipovski =

Slovenian basketball coach (born 1974)

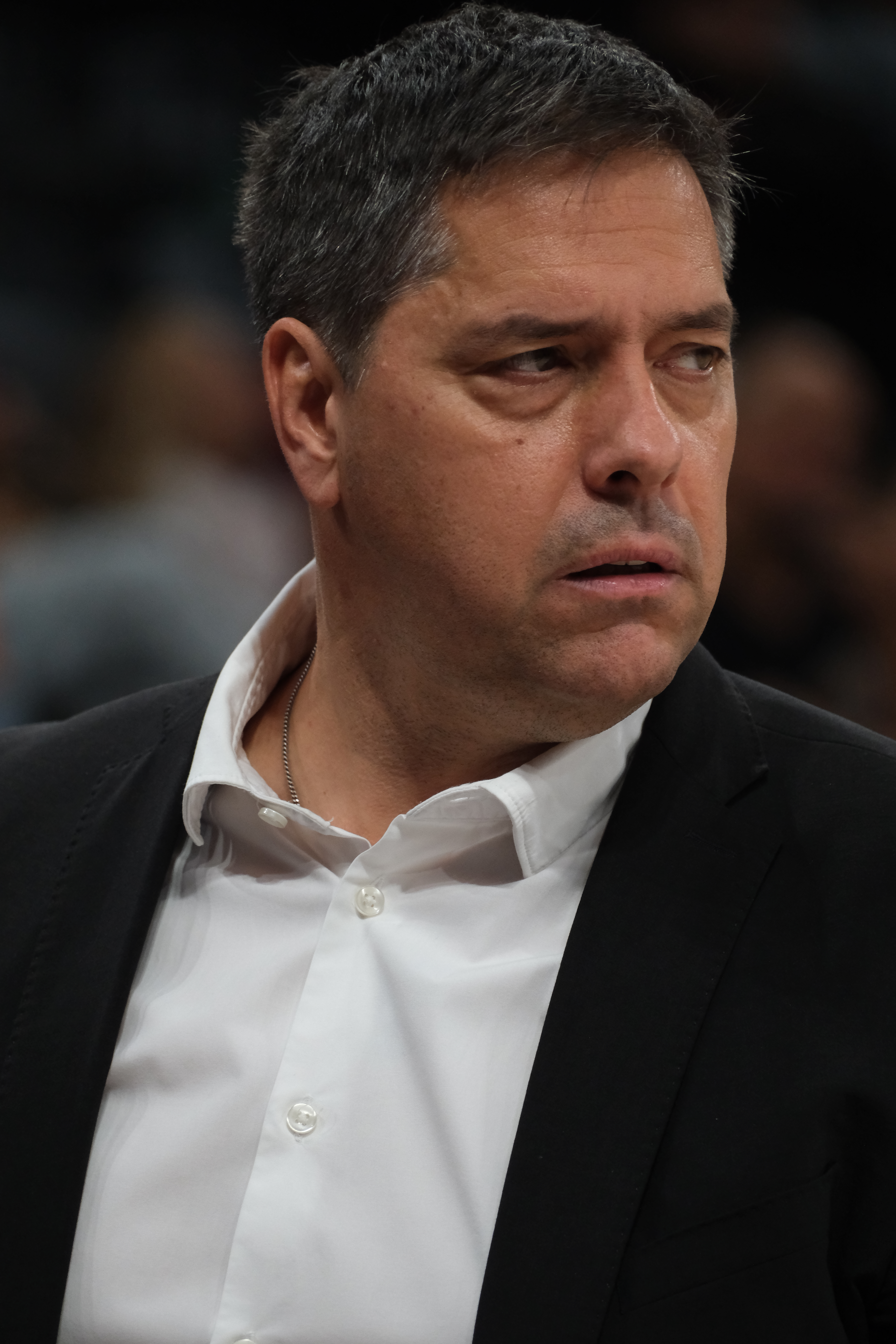
- Filipovski in 2025

Würzburg Baskets
- Position: Head coach
- League: Basketball Bundesliga

Personal information
- Born: 6 September 1974 (age 52) Ljubljana, SR Slovenia, SFR Yugoslavia
- Coaching career: 1996–present

Career history

Coaching
- 1996–2003: Union Olimpija (assistant)
- 2003–2005: Union Olimpija
- 2005–2006: Union Olimpija (assistant)
- 2006–2009: Turów Zgorzelec
- 2009: Lokomotiv Rostov
- 2010: CSKA Moscow (assistant)
- 2011: Lottomatica Roma
- 2011–2013: Union Olimpija
- 2014–2016: Stelmet Zielona Góra
- 2016–2018: Banvit
- 2018–2019: Monaco
- 2020–2021: Partizan
- 2021–present: Würzburg Baskets

Career highlights
- As head coach: 2× Slovenian League champion (2004, 2005); 2× Polish League champion (2015, 2016); 2× Slovenian Cup winner (2004, 2005); Polish Cup winner (2015); Turkish Cup winner (2017); 2× Slovenian Super Cup winner (2003, 2004); 3× PLK Coach of the Year (2007, 2008, 2016)

Sašo Filipovski (born 6 September 1974) is a Macedonian-Slovenian professional basketball coach, currently serving as the head coach for Würzburg Baskets of the German Basketball Bundesliga (BBL).

== Coaching career ==
His coaching career started back in 1996 when he was an assistant coach of Union Olimpija for seven seasons until 2003. He then became a head coach of the team for two seasons. Over the 2005–06 season, he once again served as an assistant coach of the team. In 2006, Filipovski signed a contract with the Polish team Turów Zgorzelec, with whom he was a runner-up in the Polish League championship in the 2006–07 and 2007–08 season. In December 2008, after an altercation between Filipovski and a fan after a game between Turów and AZS Koszalin, Filipovski received a three-month suspension and a 60 000 złoty fine. Therefore, he parted ways with Turów in January 2009.

Over the period from 2009 until 2011, Filipovski had short stints working with the Russian teams Lokomotiv Rostov and as an assistant coach at CSKA Moscow, before being the head coach in Lottomatica Roma back in 2011. In 2011, he returned to Union Olimpija, coaching them for two seasons.

On 11 November 2014, Filipovski was named the new head coach of the Polish team Zielona Góra. In his first 2014–15 season with the team, he won the Polish League championship after 4–2 win in the final series over his former team Turów Zgorzelec. On 19 June 2015, he signed a two-year extension with the club.

On 28 June 2018, Filipovski signed a two-year contract with Monaco of the French LNB Pro A.

On 5 November 2020, Filipovski was named the head coach of the Serbian team Partizan. On 8 March 2021, Partizan parted ways with him.

In the 2023-24 campaign, he led the Würzburg Baskets to the German Bundesliga semifinals, despite having one of the lower budgets in the Bundesliga. In the 2024-25 season, he managed another Bundesliga semi-final appearance with the Würzburg team.

== See also ==
- List of KK Partizan head coaches
