= Arkadiusz Miłoszewski =

Polish basketball player and coach

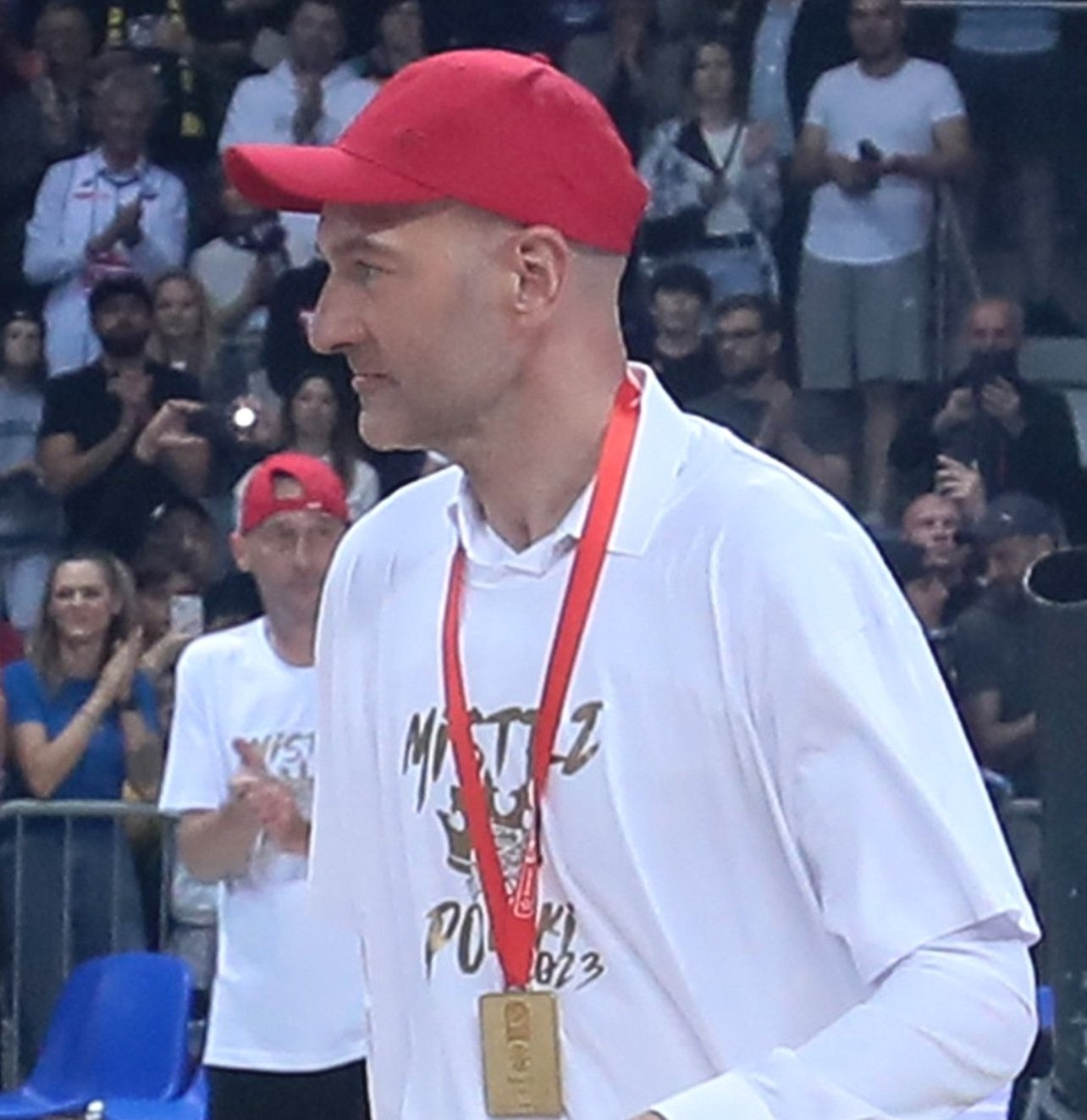

Zastal Zielona Góra
- Title: Head coach
- League: PLK

Personal information
- Born: March 22, 1973 (age 53) Warsaw, Poland

Career information
- Playing career: 1992–2010
- Position: Forward / center
- Coaching career: 2007–present

Career history

Playing
- 2003–2010: Polonia Warszawa

Coaching
- 2014–present: Basket Zielona Góra (assistant)
- 2016–2021: Poland (assistant)
- 2021–2025: Wilki Morskie Szczecin
- 2025–present: Zastal Zielona Góra

Career highlights
- As head coach: Polish League champion (2023); PLK Coach of the Year (2023)

Arkadiusz Miłoszewski (born March 22, 1973) is a Polish professional basketball coach and former national team player. He currently serves as head coach for Zastal Zielona Góra of the PLK and as assistant coach for Polish national basketball team.

He played for Poland’s national basketball team from 1994 to 1996.

On September 30, 2021, he has signed as head coach with Wilki Morskie Szczecin of the PLK.
