= Gavrilo Pajović =

Montenegrin basketball player and executive

Budućnost VOLI
- Title: Sports director
- League: Montenegrin First League; Adriatic League

Personal information
- Born: July 3, 1971 (age 55) Titograd, SR Montenegro, Yugoslavia
- Listed height: 1.87 m (6 ft 2 in)
- Listed weight: 85 kg (187 lb)

Career information
- NBA draft: 1993: undrafted
- Playing career: 1989–2008
- Position: Point guard
- Number: 5

Career history
- 1989–1991: Budućnost
- 1991–1992: Bosna
- 1992–1993: Partizan
- 1993–2000: Budućnost
- 2000–2001: Igokea
- 2001–2002: Primorka
- 2002–2005: Budućnost
- 2007–2008: Mediteran Herceg Novi

Career highlights
- 2× YUBA League champion (1999, 2000); Bosnian League champion (2001); 2× Yugoslav Cup winner (1996, 1998)

Gavrilo Pajović (Serbian Cyrillic: Гаврило Пајовић; born July 3, 1971) is a Montenegrin professional basketball executive and former player. He is currently serving as the sports director for Budućnost VOLI of the Adriatic League and the Montenegrin League.

== Playing career ==
Pajović spent the most of his professional career with his hometown team Budućnost. He had three stints there. During his second stint (1993–2000), Pajović won two Yugoslav Championships and two Yugoslav Cups. Also, he played for Belgrade powerhouse Partizan in the 1992–93 season and for Primorka Bar in the 2001–02 season.

Pajović spent two seasons in Bosnia and Herzegovina. He played for Bosna in the 1991–92 season, and for Igokea in the 2000–01 season. During his stint with Igokea he won the Bosnia and Herzegovina Championship.

In 2008, Pajović finished his playing career with Mediteran Herceg Novi.

== National team career ==
Pajović was a member of the Yugoslavia Juniors team what played at the 1991 FIBA Under-19 World Championship in Edmonton, Canada. Over eight tournament games, he averaged 2.2 points per game.

== Post-playing career ==
After retirement in 2008, Pajović joined the non-playing staff of Budućnost where he became a sports director.

== Personali life ==
His son, Feđa (born 2001) is a basketball player, who played for Studentski centar and Metalac Valjevo.
