= Igor Jovović =

Montenegrin basketball coach

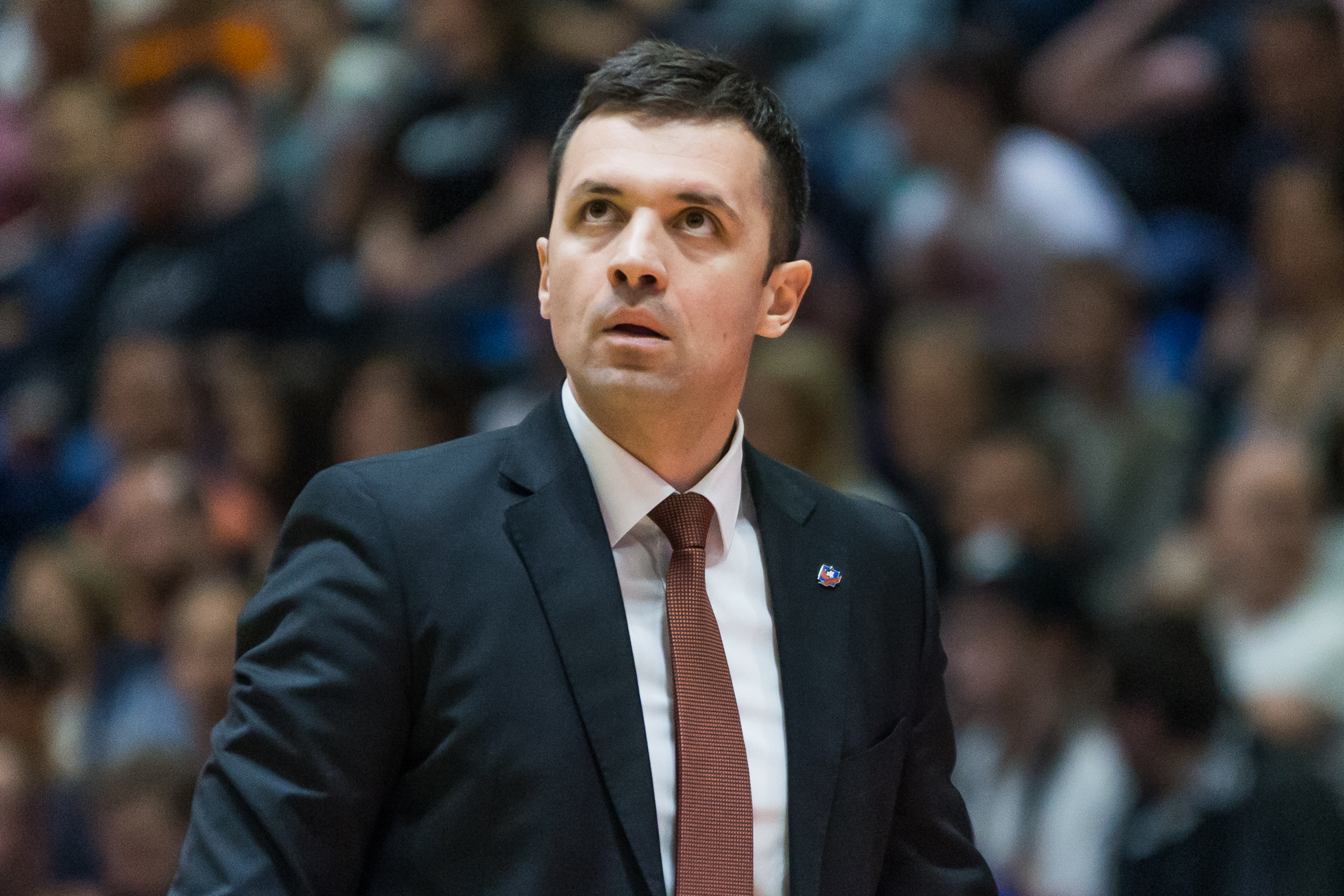

Bashkimi
- Position: Head coach
- League: Kosovo Basketball Superleague

Personal information
- Born: October 16, 1982 (age 44) Titograd, SR Montenegro, SFR Yugoslavia
- Coaching career: 2007–present

Career history

Coaching
- 2007–2013: Budućnost (assistant)
- 2013–2015: Budućnost
- 2015–2016: Sutjeska
- 2016–2018: Mitteldeutscher
- 2018–2019: Stelmet Zielona Góra
- 2019–2020: Bayern Munich (assistant)
- 2020–2021: Telekom Baskets Bonn
- 2021–2025: Mitteldeutscher BC
- 2025–present: Bashkimi

Career highlights
- As Coach: German ProA champion (2017)

Igor Jovović (Serbian Cyrillic: Игор Јововић, pronounced [îɡor jôːʋoʋitɕ]; born 16 October 1982) is a Montenegrin professional basketball coach who is head coach for Bashkimi of the Kosovo Basketball Superleague.

== Coaching career ==
Jovović got his first job in coaching career as an assistant coach to Dejan Radonjić at Budućnost Podgorica, in 2007. In 2013 he was appointed as head coach of Budućnost. With Budućnost, he won two Montenegrin League titles and managed to play two Adriatic League semifinals in both the 2013–14 and 2014–15 seasons. He resigned from Budućnost on 26 November 2015.

In the summer of 2015, Jovović was appointed as new head coach of Nikšić-based team Sutjeska. On 15 July 2020, he signed with Telekom Baskets Bonn of the Basketball Bundesliga (BBL) as head coach.

On June 7, 2021, he has signed with Mitteldeutscher BC of the German Basketball Bundesliga.
