= Petar Mijović =

Montenegrin basketball coach

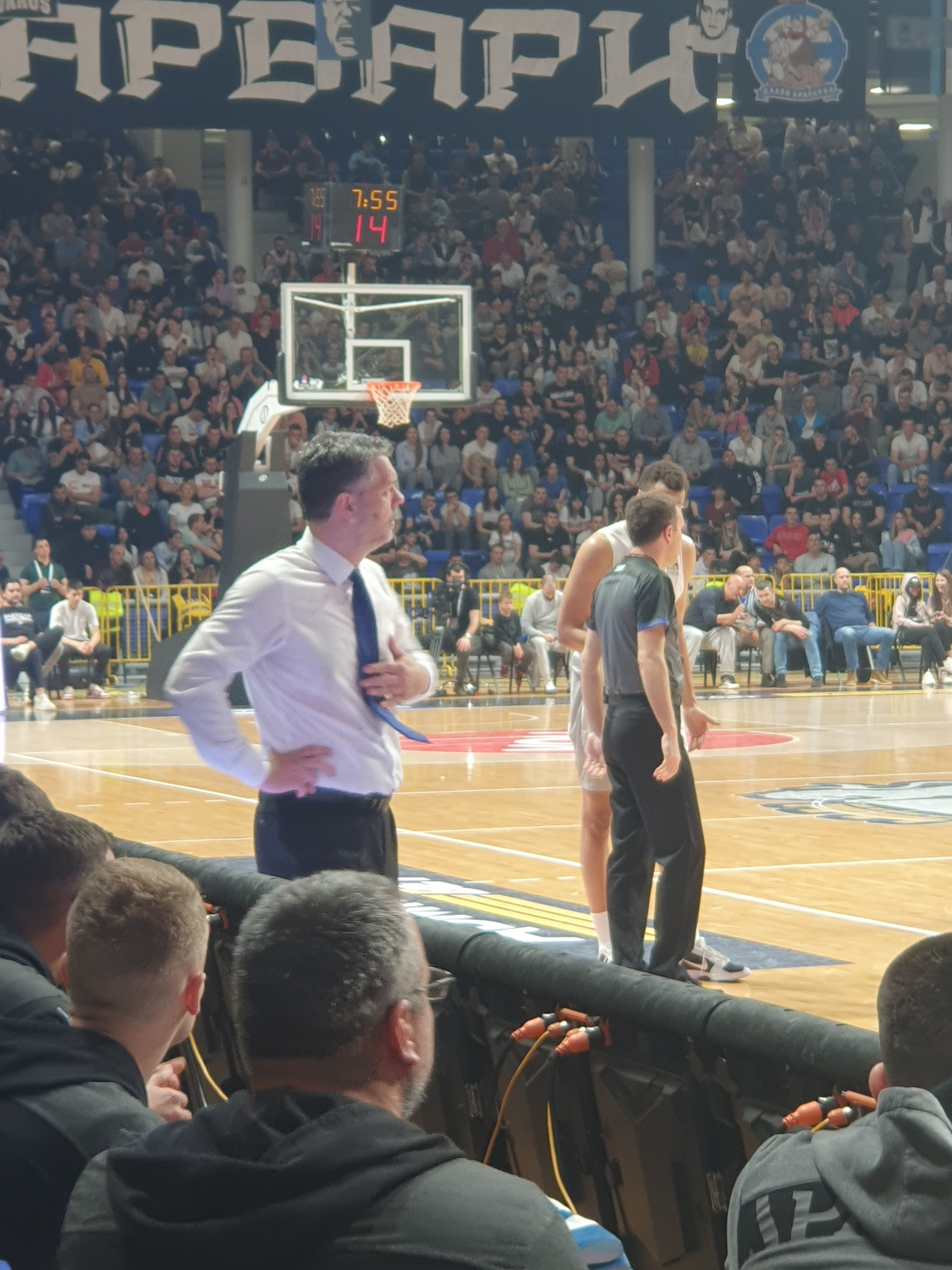
- Mijović 2023.

Studentski centar
- Position: Head coach
- League: ABA League; Prva A Liga

Personal information
- Born: 23 February 1982 (age 44) Bar, SR Montenegro, SFR Yugoslavia
- Coaching career: 2002–present

Career history

Coaching
- 2002–2003: OKK Primorka (assistant)
- 2003–2009: Mornar Bar (assistant)
- 2011–2012: Podgorica
- 2013–2014: Chorale Roanne (assistant)
- 2014–2015: Zeta
- 2015–2016: Bashkimi Prizren
- 2016: Sigal Prishtina
- 2017–2018: Budućnost (youth)
- 2018–2019: Budućnost (assistant)
- 2019: Budućnost
- 2019–2021: Budućnost
- 2021: Śląsk Wrocław
- 2021–2022: Atomerőmű SE
- 2022–2023: Studentski centar (youth)
- 2023: Budućnost
- 2024: Golden Eagle Ylli
- 2024–present: Studentski centar

Career highlights
- As head coach: Montenegrin League champion (2019)

Petar Mijović (Serbian Cyrillic: Петар Мијовић; born 23 February 1982) is a Montenegrin professional basketball coach, currently serving as head coach of Studentski centar of the Prva A Liga and ABA League.

== Coaching career ==
=== Budućnost (2017–2021) ===
In 2017, Mijović joined the coaching staff of Budućnost under-19 as head coach. In the next season, he was added to the senior team's coaching staff.

On 24 April 2019, following the resignation of Jasmin Repeša, Mijović was named new head coach of Budućnost. On 20 June 2019, his position took Slobodan Subotić. On 19 October 2019, Subotić resigned and Mijović was appointed head coach of Budućnost for the second time in his head coaching career. In June 2020, he extended his contract with Budućnost for the 2020–21 season. On 27 January 2021, Mijović resigned as the head coach.

=== Śląsk Wrocław (2021) ===
On June 2, 2021, he has signed a 3-year contract with Śląsk Wrocław of the Polish Basketball League.

== Career accomplishments and awards ==
As head coach:

- Montenegrin League champion: 1 (with Budućnost: 2018–19)
