= 2017 Polish Basketball Cup =

Polish Basketball Cup
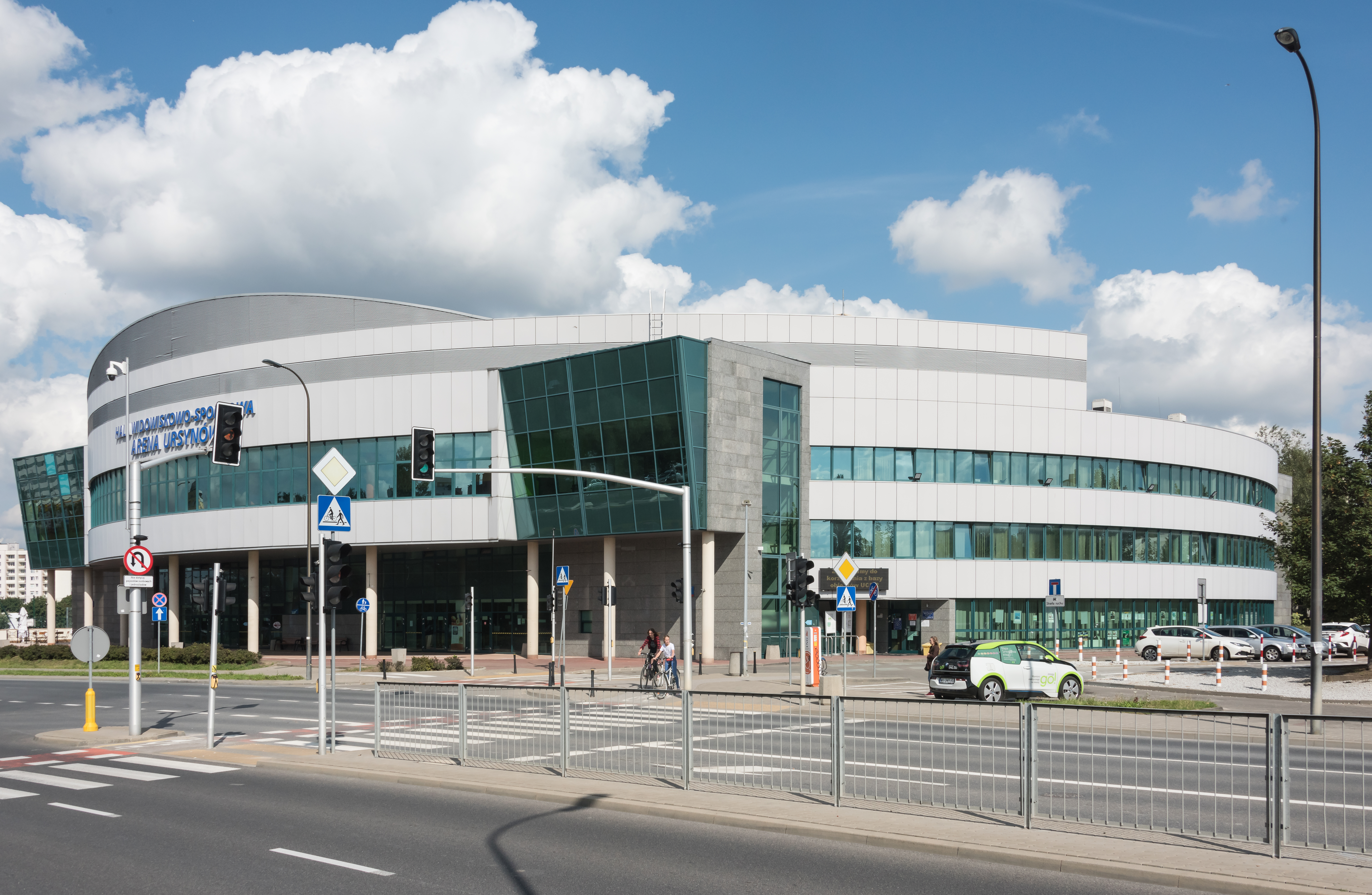
- The Arena Ursynów hosted the tournament
- Season: 2017
- Duration: 16–19 February
- Games played: 7
- Teams: 8

Regular season
- Season MVP: (Poland) Łukasz Koszarek

Finals
- Champions: Stelmet Zielona Góra (2nd title)
- Runners-up: Anwil Włocławek

The 2017 Polish Basketball Cup (Polish: Puchar Polski 2017) was the 54th edition of Poland's national cup competition for men basketball teams. It was managed by the Polish Basketball League (PLK) and was held in Warsaw, in the Arena Ursynów in February 2017.

== Qualified teams ==
The eight first qualified after the first half of the 2016–17 PLK season qualified to the tournament. The highest placed four teams would play the lowest seeded teams in the quarter-finals.

== Bracket ==
Quarterfinals
Polski Cukier Toruń	55
Stelmet Zielona Góra	79
Wilki Morskie Szczecin	58
PGE Turów	60
Trefl Sopot	72
Miasto Szkła Krosno	78
Anwil Włocławek	73
MKS Dąbrowa Górnicza	67

Semifinals
Stelmet Zielona Góra	69
PGE Turów	64
Miasto Szkła Krosno	68
Anwil Włocławek	77

Finals
Stelmet Zielona Góra	74
Anwil Włocławek	57

== Final ==
19 February 2017	Stelmet Zielona Góra	74–57	Anwil Włocławek	Warsaw
17:30 CET (UTC+01:00)	Scoring by quarter: 21-29, 48-52, 76-67, 99-74
	Pts: Đurišić, Gruszecki 12; Rebs: Đurišić 11; Asts: Florence, Kelati 4	Boxscore	Pts: Washington 15; Rebs: Sobin 8 Asts: Washington 8	Arena: Arena Ursynów

Zielona Góra	Anwil
