= Marcus Lewis (basketball, born 1992) =

American basketball player (born 1992)

No. 12 – Zastal Zielona Góra
- Position: Shooting guard
- League: Polish Basketball League

Personal information
- Born: February 16, 1992 (age 34) Streamwood, Illinois, U.S.
- Listed height: 6 ft 5 in (1.96 m)
- Listed weight: 185 lb (84 kg)

Career information
- High school: Streamwood (Streamwood, Illinois)
- College: Parkland (2010–2011); South Suburban (2011–2012); Eastern Kentucky (2012–2014)
- NBA draft: 2014: undrafted
- Playing career: 2014–present

Career history
- 2014–2015: Milwaukee Bucks
- 2015–2017: Niagara River Lions
- 2017–2018: St. John's Edge
- 2018–2019: Moncton Magic
- 2019: Guelph Nighthawks
- 2019–2020: Moncton Magic
- 2020–2021: Tampereen Pyrintö
- 2021: Lavrio
- 2021–2022: Czarni Słupsk
- 2022–2023: Skyliners Frankfurt
- 2024–2025: Szolnoki Olajbányász
- 2025–2026: Dinamo București
- 2026–present: Zastal Zielona Góra

Career highlights
- NBL Canada champion (2019)

Marcus Lewis (born February 16, 1992) is an American professional basketball player for Zastal Zielona Góra of the Polish Basketball League (PLK). He was born in Streamwood, Illinois. 2014 NCAA Dunk Contest Winner.

== High school career ==
Lewis played for Streamwood High School, at Streamwood, Illinois.

== College career ==
Lewis played for Parkland College, for South Suburban College and for Eastern Kentucky from 2010 until 2014. During his college career, he was highly regarded as one of the best dunkers in NCAA college basketball.

== Professional career ==
After going undrafted to the 2014 NBA draft, Lewis signed a non-guaranteed training camp deal with the Milwaukee Bucks in the NBA, Lewis then played five seasons in Canada with Niagara River Lions, St. John's Edge, Moncton Magic and Guelph Nighthawks. After five years in Canada, Lewis signed with Tampereen Pyrintö of the Finnish Korisliiga.

On July 17, 2021, Lewis officially signed with Greek club Lavrio of the Basketball Champions League. In eight games, he averaged 11.5 points and 3.2 rebounds per game.

On November 27, 2021, Lewis signed with Czarni Słupsk of the Polish Basketball League.

On November 20, 2022, he signed with Skyliners Frankfurt of the Basketball Bundesliga.

On September 2, 2024 he signed with Szolnoki Olajbányász of the Hungarian first tier Nemzeti Bajnokság I/A.

On November 11, 2026, he signed with the Zastal Zielona Góra of the Polish Basketball League.
