= KK Budućnost =

Basketball club in Podgorica, Montenegro

Budućnost VOLI
- Nickname: Tim iz Njegoševog parka Plavo-bijeli
- Leagues: Prva A Liga; ABA League; EuroCup
- Founded: 1949; 77 years ago
- Arena: Morača Sports Center
- Capacity: 6,000
- Location: Podgorica, Montenegro
- Team colors: Blue and white
- Main sponsor: VOLI
- President: Dragan Bokan
- Team manager: Gavrilo Pajović
- Head coach: Andrej Žakelj
- Team captain: Đorđije Jovanović
- Affiliation: Studentski centar
- Championships: 1 ABA League; 3 YUBA League; 18 Montenegrin League; 3 Yugoslav Cups; 18 Montenegrin Cups
- Website: kkbuducnost.me
Home	Away

KK Budućnost (Montenegrin: КК Будућност, lit. 'KK Future'; pronounced [budǔːtɕnoːst]), currently known as Budućnost VOLI (lit. 'Future VOLI') for sponsorship reasons, is a professional basketball club based in Podgorica, Montenegro. It is a part of the Budućnost Sports Society. The club competes in the Prva A Liga and the ABA League, and is one of the most successful teams in Montenegro with 21 league titles. Budućnost is a founding member and shareholder of the Adriatic Basketball Association.

== History ==
=== 1949–1979: Formation and early years ===
The club was founded in 1949 when Budućnost sports society decided to form the men's basketball club. Budućnost participated in its first competition in early June 1949, at the third Montenegrin Championship. The Championships took place in Cetinje, and in addition to Budućnost, three other teams from Montenegro participated. The first success came two years later – in 1951, when Budućnost took the first place in the First Championships of the Cities, which was held in Herceg-Novi.

In 1957, a new outdoor basketball court was constructed in the City Park, on the Morača river's left bank.

Budućnost became champion of Montenegro for the first time in 1958. The championship was played in three zones, and many more teams took part this time. All credit for this achievement goes to: Martinović, Pavlović, Vujović, Đukić, Golubović, Lekić, Belada, Đurišić, Tamindžić and Vukčević. Because of this result, Buducnost got the chance to play in the qualifications for the First League. The qualifications did not take place, because of the decision of Yugoslav Basketball Federation that the team of Zastava from Kragujevac should play in the First League, without any matches being played.

In the 1959–60 season, Budućnost became the Montenegrin basketball champion for the second time. The Qualifications for the First League were played in Podgorica, and the teams of Dinamo Pančevo and Rabotnički Skoplje took part. Dinamo Pančevo eventually qualified for the First League.

Budućnost dominated the Montenegrin basketball scene in 1961. Because of the financial problems, the championships were reduced to a tournament played in Podgorica, and the home team easily won all of its matches.

Budućnost had to wait until 1969 for more success. That year the team won two trophies. In the Republic League, Budućnost won the first place and again became the Montenegrin basketball champion. Budućnost played the qualifications for the Second League group East once more, but in the very strong competition from clubs from Serbia and Macedonia they failed to qualify. The team also won the Championships of the Cities, for the third time in its history.

The year 1970 was the turning point for Montenegrin basketball. The championships were played in the united league for the first time in history, without any zones. Budućnost became the Montenegrin basketball champion. The club managed to repeat the same success in the next year and became the Montenegrin basketball champion for the second time in a row (sixth overall). In the same year, the team finally managed to qualify for the Second League. Qualifications were held in Podgorica. Unfortunately, Budućnost managed to play for only one year in the Second League (1971–72).

In the 1973 Montenegrin champion was determined in a tie-breaker between Budućnost and Jedinstvo from Bijelo Polje, because both teams had the same number of points at the end of the season. The Game was played on the neutral court, and Budućnost proved that it still was the best. Both clubs took part in the qualifications for the Second League, but neither managed to qualify. The tournament was played in Skopje. Next year Budućnost had only one loss in the Montenegrin League and became the Montenegrin basketball champion once again. In the same year, the tournament of the Republics took place. The Budućnost players who played for Montenegro national basketball team were: Blažević, Begović, Pavićević, and Popović. The team managed to qualify for the Second League group South this year.

Because there was no suitable basketball arena in Titograd, Budućnost was forced to play its games in the Second League (season 1974–75) outside its hometown. Budućnost was by far the best team in group South – it had 11 wins and only 3 losses. That year the fusion of the clubs Akademik and Budućnost took place, so the team now had the best players from Akademik. The team roster for this year was: Begović, Brajović, Blažević, Šćepanović, Latković, Đurašković, I. Popović, M. Popović, Vukićević, Leković, Šarkić, Pavićević, Kazić and Martinović, and the head coach was Petar Blažević. The team achieved its first bigger success in Yugoslav Cup, qualifying for the Last 16 stage.

In the 1975–76 season, the Second League was once again dominated by Budućnost. At the end of the regular season Budućnost was tied with the team of Budućnost Peć, with 13 wins and 5 losses. In the tie-breaker that took place in Belgrade, the team from Podgorica was much better and won. The new players this season were Garić and Begović.

Next year the team was tied for the first place with the team of Kumanovo, but this Budućnost lost in the deciding tie-breaker. In the season of 1977–78 Budućnost qualified for the quarter-finals of the Yugoslav Cup, where it was beaten by Bosna. In the same year the team won the Montenegrin Cup.

=== 1979–1986: Yugoslav First League promotion and successes ===
The 1979–80 season is very significant in club's history. Budućnost took the first place in the Second League and automatically qualified for the Yugoslav First Federal League. The players were: Nikola Antić, Dragan Ivanović, Duško Ivanović, Vukićević, Sutulović, Vukosavljević, Petrović, Borislav Đurović, Bojanić, Garić, Slavenko Rakočević, Nesević and Dragović. The team was coached by Rusmir Halilović. As hosts, the team had to play its games in Danilovgrad.

Budućnost's promotion to the First League brought a resurgence of popularity for the game of basketball in Titograd in the summer of 1980. The First League had a representative from Montenegro again after 15 years. Shortly before the debut in the First League, Morača Sports Center was opened and the team played all of its official matches there.

In its First League debut season, the team achieved a significant success finishing eight with a 9–13 record. Team roster for this year was: Dragan and Duško Ivanović, Nikola Antić, Žarko Knežević, Kovačević, Slavenko Rakočević, Goran and Milorad Bojanić, Borislav Đurović, Petrović, Milatović. The coaches were Čedomir Đurašković, with assistants Vukićević, Garić.

In the 1984–85 season, the team managed to qualify for the play-off quarter-finals after beating Jugoplastika Split in three games. In the quarter-finals the team met with Crvena zvezda, who won twice in Belgrade, while Budućnost triumphed in Titograd.

Over its five top-tier seasons Budućnost fought hard to remain a First League participant, finding itself several times in relegation danger, but managing to overcome it. The big breakthrough would unexpectedly come in the 1985-86 season, its sixth in the top flight, although in the summer 1985 off-season it looked like Buducnost was in for another season of desperate struggle to stay up. Head coach Vlade Đurović left, taking an offer from KK Zadar and the player situation wasn't much better – club mainstays 26-year-old Goran Bojanić, 24-year-old Žarko Đurišić, and veteran Goran Rakočević left while even talented youth players joined the exodus as 18-year-old Zdravko Radulović transferred to KK Bosna, 21-year-old Saša Radunović took an offer from Wichita State University, and 17-year-old Luka Pavićević did the same with University of Utah.

Still despite all hardship, the incoming young head coach Milutin Petrović with a roster consisting of the Ivanović brothers, Nikola Antić, supreme young talent Žarko Paspalj, Milatović, Jadran Vujačić and Veselin Šćepanović, managed to lead the team to a 13–9 record and 3rd place in the league thus qualifying for the next season's Korać Cup, the club's first ever participation in the European competition.

=== 1986–1998: European debut and domestic permanence ===
In its European debut Budućnost had three wins and five losses, overall. It began the competition in the first round, played over two legs, against Karşıyaka S.K., winning both games and qualifying for the round robin group where it got drawn with JuveCaserta, Estudiantes, and Challans. Out of six round robin games, Budućnost managed only a single win, which meant elimination from the Korać Cup.

Following a few years of historic success for the club, Budućnost got relegated at the end of the 1987–88 season finishing dead last with a 6–16 record. However, the very next year Budućnost was promoted and never lost its place in the First League again.

In the 1995–96 season, Budućnost won the Yugoslav Cup for the first time. In the final tournament, held in Nikšić, Budućnost defeated BFC Beočin and Partizan. Roster: Šćepanović, Pajović, Tomović, Đaletić, Mudreša, P. Popović, A. Ivanović, Đikanović, Darko Ivanović, Simović, Vukčević and Mugoša. Head coach was Živko Brajović.

The Yugoslav Cup was won for the second time in the 1997–98 season, also in Nikšić. In the final tournament Budućnost was better than Partizan and Beobanka. Roster: Šćepanović, Pajović, Krivokapić, Vukčević, Ostojić, A. Ivanović, M. Ivanović, Ćeranić, S. Peković, Radunović and Dragutinović. The team was coached by Goran Bojanić.

=== 1998–2003: Prominent years ===
After wins in the Yugoslav Cup, Budućnost won three successive YUBA League championship titles. The first came in the 1998–99 season, in which the club had significant success in European competition. Budućnost qualified for the Saporta Cup semifinals, though lost to Benetton Treviso. Roster: Vlado Šćepanović, Gavrilo Pajović, Goran Bošković, Dejan Radonjić, Đuro Ostojić, Blagota Sekulić, Dragan Vukčević, Saša Radunović, Dragan Ćeranić, Nikola Bulatović, Balša Radunović and Željko Topalović. The team was coached by Miroslav Nikolić.

Budućnost won its second straight title without a loss (both in the regular season and in the play-offs) – a total of 27 wins. In the 1999–2000 season, Budućnost participated in the Euroleague for the first time. Due to the UN sanctions on FR Yugoslavia, Budućnost had to play its home game away from Podgorica (in Sarajevo and Budapest), but still managed to qualify for the Last 16 stage, where they lost to future champion Panathinaikos 2–1 after taking a great fight to the champion. Roster: Šćepanović, Pajović, Haris Brkić, Radonjić, Sekulić, Vukčević, Radunović, Vladimir Kuzmanović, Bulatović, Dejan Tomašević and Milenko Topić. The head coach was Miroslav Nikolić.

Budućnost won its first "double" in the 2000–01 season. The Final 8 tournament of the Yugoslav Cup was held in Vršac. In the quarterfinals Budućnost defeated Hemofarm, in the semifinals it defeated Lovćen, and in the finals, Budućnost outplayed Partizan, whom Budućnost also played and beaten in the play-off finals. In the modern Euroleague the team qualified for the Top 16 stage, losing to Real Madrid 0:2. Roster: Bojan Bakić, Brkić (went to Partizan at the half of the season), Saša Obradović, Radonjić, Igor Rakočević, Sekulić, Vukčević, Radunović, Kuzmanović, Dejan Milojević, Tomašević, Topić and Jerome James. Head coach of the team was Bogdan Tanjević (the team was coached by Nikolić for three months in the first half of the season).

Over the next two seasons, 2001–2002 and 2002–2003, Budućnost lost many of its star players. In 2001–2002, Budućnost lost its positions to Partizan, who defeated Budućnost in both the Cup finals and the Yugoslavian League finals. After the season, Rakočević, the last player of the Budućnost golden age, departed for the NBA. In 2002–2003, Budućnost was led by talented young prospects Žarko Čabarkapa, Milojević and Aleksandar Pavlović. Despite their play, Budućnost plummeted to the last place in the standings in the EuroLeague and did not reach the finals of Serbian and Montenegrin League.

=== 2003–2006: Quieter years ===
A quieter period followed during which Budućnost took part in the ULEB Cup, though it missed the elimination rounds in 2004 and 2005. Budućnost reached the Serbia and Montenegro League semifinals in its last appearance in that competition.

=== 2006–2011: Domestic dominance ===
Following the Montenegrin independence from Serbia and Montenegro in 2006, Budućnost naturally became the new team to beat in the reborn Montenegrin Basketball League and has won five consecutive titles since 2007 with a combined 89–1 record – which says plenty about its dominance. It still participated in the Adriatic (ABA) League, with solid successes. Budućnost was close to making the ABA League Final Four in 2009–10 and missed out on the Eurocup after falling to Brose Baskets by a single point at the end of a home-and-away Qualifying Round series.

=== 2011–present: Rise to regional prominence ===
In the 2010–11 season, Budućnost came up short in the Turkish Airlines Euroleague Qualifying Round and the Eurocup Regular Season, but once again won the Montenegrin League and the Montenegrin Basketball Cup titles. It also reached the Adriatic League Final Four, where it lost 62–58 against Partizan in the semifinals.

Since 2011, a Montenegrin retail company VOLI has been the general sponsor of the club, with company's CEO Dragan Bokan becoming the club's president. In domestic competitions, Budućnost continued its dominance by capturing its 11th consecutive Montenegrin Basketball League championship in 2016–17 season. Except being the runner-up to KK Sutjeska in 2013 Montenegrin Cup, it clinched all trophies from 2011 to 2017. Also, it became a standard EuroCup participant and one of top five teams of the ABA League in period from 2011 to 2017, reaching to the semifinal for five times.

In June 2017, Aleksandar Džikić was named as the head coach of Budućnost. In February 2018, Budućnost won its 5th consecutive and 11th in total Montenegrin Cup, after beating KK Mornar Bar with 87–83 in the final game. In the ABA League, it secured second place of the regular season with 17–5 score. In the semifinal series of ABA League, it eliminated the Croatian team Cedevita with 2–1 score. In April 2018, Budućnost with 3–1 score won in the final series of the ABA League against the reigning champions Crvena zvezda. Thus, they were crowned champions of the ABA League for the first time in history and also secured a spot in 2018–19 EuroLeague, that would become its first appearance in the elite European competition after 16 seasons. Budućnost actually lost the Prva A Liga finals for the first time since the establishment of the league in 2007.

In the middle of 2018–19 season, after series of bad results Budućnost sacked Džikić and named Jasmin Repeša as team's head coach. Also, it added several high-profile names to its roster, among whom were Goga Bitadze and Norris Cole. However, even with much stronger roster in second half of the season, Budućnost failed to fulfill any goals that were set at the beginning of the season. In 2018–19 EuroLeague, Budućnost finished in 15th place having the second-worst record of 6 wins and 24 losses. In the 2018–19 ABA League First Division, it failed to defend the title in repeated final series match-up of previous season, losing to Crvena zvezda with 3–2 in series. In the A Liga, Budućnost won back the championship.

== Home arena ==
Budućnost plays its home games at Morača Sports Center (Montenegrin: Sportski centar Morača, Спортски центар Морача), a sport venue located in Podgorica, Montenegro. The venue is located in the new part of Podgorica, on the right bank of Morača River, after which it got its name. Construction of this sports complex began in 1978, and various sport facilities are scattered across a five-hectare area. Today, its main sports hall has a capacity of 5,500 seats

== Supporters ==
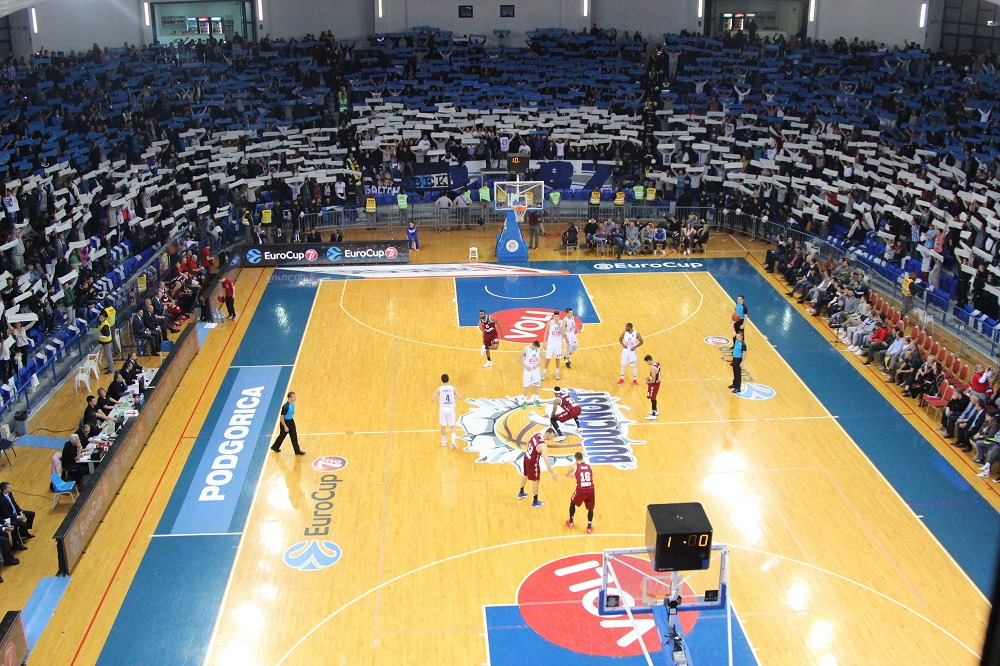
Inside view of the Morača Sports Center and Barbarians (Varvari) choreography

Buducnost fans are known as Varvari (Barbarians), a group founded in 1987. The group's traditional colours are blue and white, which are also the colours of all the Budućnost sports clubs. For FK Budućnost Podgorica home games, Varvari occupy the northern stand (Sjever) of the Podgorica city stadium. They also have a reserved stand at the Morača Sports Center, as supporters of KK Buducnost basketball club. The focal point for the group during the late 1990s was the basketball club, which started investing heavily while the football club toiled in the lower half of the table.

Since its foundation years, Varvari has gained a reputation as a violent group, and in the recent history they made a few biggest accidents on the football matches. At First League 2004-05 game Budućnost - Partizan Belgrade, flares, blocks, construction materials and similar objects were thrown from the North stand to the pitch and match was abandoned for 15 minutes. Year later, game Budućnost - Crvena Zvezda Belgrade was suspended for two hours after home supporters (Varvari) threw tear gas on the pitch and, after that, attacked visitors' ultras. On the spring 2006, there was a crowd violence on the local rivals game Budućnost - Zeta. In the Montenegrin First League, numerous matches of FK Budućnost were suspended due to crowd violence or crowd-invasion to the pitch. During the last seasons, there was an escalation of violence on Montenegrin Derby games.

They are one of the larger fan groups in Montenegro. Some Balkan fan magazines have compared them to fan groups from the former Yugoslavia.

== Season by season ==
The following table contains information from season 2006–07 onward:

Season	Tier	League	Pos.	Montenegrin Cup	ABA League	European competitions		Head coach
2006–07	1	First League	1st	Champion	Fifth position	—N/a	—	(Montenegro) Dejan Radonjić
2007–08	1	First League	1st	Champion	Sixth position	2 ULEB Cup	R32	(Montenegro) Dejan Radonjić
2008–09	1	First League	1st	Champion	Sixth position	2 Eurocup	RS	(Montenegro) Dejan Radonjić
2009–10	1	First League	1st	Champion	Fifth position	3 EuroChallenge^{[a]}	L16	(Montenegro) Dejan Radonjić
2010–11	1	First League	1st	Champion	Fourth position	2 Eurocup^{[b]}	RS	(Montenegro) Dejan Radonjić
2011–12	1	First League	1st	Champion	Fourth position	2 Eurocup^{[b]}	QF	(Montenegro) Dejan Radonjić
2012–13	1	First League	1st	Runner-up	Fifth position	2 Eurocup	QF	(Montenegro) Dejan Radonjić
2013–14	1	First League	1st	Champion	Fifth position	2 Eurocup	RS	(Montenegro) Igor Jovović
2014–15	1	First League	1st	Champion	Third position	2 Eurocup	L32	(Montenegro) Igor Jovović
2015–16	1	First League	1st	Champion	Third position	2 Eurocup	RS	(Montenegro) Luka Pavićević
2016–17	1	First League	1st	Champion	Fourth position	2 EuroCup	RS	(Greece) Ilias Zouros
2017–18	1	First League	2nd	Champion	Champion	2 EuroCup	QF	(Serbia) Aleksandar Džikić
2018–19	1	First League	1st	Champion	Runner-up	1 EuroLeague	RS	(Croatia) Jasmin Repeša
2019–20	1	First League	1st	Champion	Runner-up	2 EuroCup	RS	(Montenegro) Petar Mijović
2020–21	1	First League	1st	Champion	Runner-up	2 EuroCup	QF	(Montenegro) Petar Mijović
2021–22	1	First League	1st	Champion	Third position	2 EuroCup	EF	(Serbia) Aleksandar Džikić
2022–23	1	First League	1st	Champion	Third position	2 EuroCup	EF	(Montenegro) Petar Mijović
2023–24	1	First League	1st	Runner-up	Third position	2 EuroCup	RS	(Slovenia) Andrej Žakelj
2024–25	1	First League	1st	Champion	Runner-up	2 EuroCup	EF	(Slovenia) Andrej Žakelj
2025–26	1	First League		Champion		2 EuroCup	EF	(Slovenia) Andrej Žakelj

Source: Eurobasket.com

^{A} Failed to qualify to EuroCup (2 tier) ^{b} Failed to qualify to Euroleague (1 tier)

== Honours ==
=== Domestic competitions ===
==== League ====
- Montenegrin League

  - * Winners (18): 2007, 2008, 2009, 2010, 2011, 2012, 2013, 2014, 2015, 2016, 2017, 2019, 2021, 2022, 2023, 2024, 2025, 2026

Runners-up (1): 2018

- Serbia and Montenegro League

  - * Winners (3): 1999, 2000, 2001

  - *Runners-up (1): 2002

==== Cups ====
- Montenegrin Cup

  - * Winners (18): 2007, 2008, 2009, 2010, 2011, 2012, 2014, 2015, 2016, 2017, 2018, 2019, 2020, 2021, 2022, 2023, 2025, 2026

Runners-up (2): 2013, 2024

- Serbia and Montenegro Cup

  - * Winners (3): 1996, 1998, 2001

  - *Runners-up (1): 2002

=== International success ===
- EuroLeague:
  - Top 16 (2): 1999–00, 2000–01
- EuroCup
  - 1/4 Finals (4): 2011–12, 2012-13, 2017-18, 2020-21

=== Regional competitions ===
- ABA League

  - Winners (1): 2018

  - Runners-up (3): 2019, 2021, 2025
Final Four (6): 2010, 2011, 2014, 2015, 2016, 2017

=== Other competitions ===
- Igalo, Montenegro Invitational Game

Winners (1): 2008

== Players ==
=== Current roster ===
Note: Flags indicate national team eligibility at FIBA-sanctioned events. Players may hold other non-FIBA nationalities not displayed.

KK Budućnost Podgorica roster
Players
Coaches

Pos.	No.	Nat.	Name	Ht.	Wt.	Age
PF	0	(United States)	Smith, Justin	2.01 m (6 ft 7 in)	100 kg (220 lb)	27 – 1 March 1999
SF	1	(South Sudan)	Shayok, Marial	1.96 m (6 ft 5 in)	95 kg (209 lb)	31 – 26 July 1995
SG	3	(United States)	Magee, Fletcher	1.93 m (6 ft 4 in)	91 kg (201 lb)	30 – 13 November 1996
SF	7	(Montenegro)	Slavković, Andrija	2.02 m (6 ft 8 in)	100 kg (220 lb)	27 – 15 February 1999
PF	8	(Montenegro)	Hadžibegović, Emir	2.06 m (6 ft 9 in)	102 kg (225 lb)	30 – 24 August 1996
SG	10	(Panama)	Molinar, Iverson	1.93 m (6 ft 4 in)	93 kg (205 lb)	26 – 3 December 1999
PG	11	(United States)	Ferrell, Yogi	1.83 m (6 ft 0 in)	81 kg (179 lb)	33 – 9 May 1993
SF	13	(Montenegro)	Jovanović, Đorđije (C)	1.97 m (6 ft 6 in)	88 kg (194 lb)	23 – 15 May 2003
PF	15	(United States)	Morgan, Juwan	2.01 m (6 ft 7 in)	105 kg (231 lb)	29 – 17 April 1997
C	16	(France)	Boutsiele, Jerry	2.07 m (6 ft 9 in)	94 kg (207 lb)	34 – 20 April 1992
F/C	45	(Serbia)	Đorđević, Stefan	2.06 m (6 ft 9 in)		27 – 4 December 1998
G	50	(Ukraine)	Kovliar, Oleksandr	1.90 m (6 ft 3 in)	76 kg (168 lb)	24 – 24 June 2002
SF	83	(France)	Bouteille, Axel	2.01 m (6 ft 7 in)	82 kg (181 lb)	31 – 14 May 1995

Head coach

- (Slovenia) Andrej Žakelj

Assistant coach(es)

- (Montenegro) Vladimir Todorović
- (Montenegro) Vaso Milović

Strength & conditioning coach(es)

- (Montenegro) Nikola Musić

Team manager

- (Montenegro) Gavrilo Pajović

Legend

- (C) Team captain
- Injured

- Roster
Updated: October 3, 2025

=== Depth chart ===
Pos.	Starting 5	Bench 1	Bench 2
C	Justin Smith	Jerry Boutsiele	Stefan Đorđević
PF	Juwan Morgan	Emir Hadžibegović	Andrija Slavković
SF	Axel Bouteille	Marial Shayok	Đorđije Jovanović
SG	Iverson Molinar	Fletcher Magee
PG	Yogi Ferrell	Oleksandr Kovliar

== Head coaches ==
- (Socialist Federal Republic of Yugoslavia) Nikola Sekulović (1977–1978)
- (Socialist Federal Republic of Yugoslavia) Rusmir Halilović (1979–1980)
- (Socialist Federal Republic of Yugoslavia) Čedomir Đurašković (1980–1984)
- (Socialist Federal Republic of Yugoslavia) Vlade Đurović (1984–1985)
- (Socialist Federal Republic of Yugoslavia) Milutin Petrović (1985–1986)
- (Socialist Federal Republic of Yugoslavia) Miodrag Baletić (1988–1991)
- (Serbia and Montenegro) Goran Bojanić (1991–1995)
- (Serbia and Montenegro) Živko Brajović (1995–1996)
- (Serbia and Montenegro) Milovan Stepandić (1996–1997)
- (Serbia and Montenegro) Goran Bojanić (1997–1998)
- (Serbia and Montenegro) Miroslav Nikolić (1998–2000)
- (Serbia and Montenegro) Bogdan Tanjević (2001)
- (Serbia and Montenegro) Zoran Sretenović (2001)
- (Serbia and Montenegro) Miodrag Kadija (2001–2002)
- (Serbia and Montenegro) Darko Ruso (2002)
- (Serbia and Montenegro) Zvezdan Mitrović (2002)
- (Serbia and Montenegro) Vlade Đurović (2002)
- (Serbia and Montenegro) Miodrag Baletić (2002–2004)
- (Slovenia) Zoran Martič (2004–2005)
- (Montenegro) Dejan Radonjić (2005–2013)
- (Montenegro) Igor Jovović (2013–2015)
- (Montenegro) Luka Pavićević (2015–2016)
- (Montenegro) Vlado Šćepanović (2016)
- (Greece) Ilias Zouros (2016–2017)
- (Serbia) Aleksandar Džikić (2017–2018)
- (Croatia) Jasmin Repeša (2019)
- (Montenegro) Petar Mijović (2019)
- (Slovenia) Slobodan Subotić (2019)
- (Montenegro) Petar Mijović (2019–2021)
- (Serbia) Dejan Milojević (2021)
- (Serbia) Aleksandar Džikić (2021–2022)
- (Serbia) Vlade Jovanović (2022–2023)
- (Montenegro) Petar Mijović (2023)
- (Slovenia) Andrej Žakelj (2023–present)

== Notable players ==
Note: Flags indicate national team eligibility at FIBA-sanctioned events. Players may hold other non-FIBA nationalities not displayed.

Criteria

To appear in this section a player must have either:

- Set a club record or won an individual award while at the club
- Played at least one official international match for their national team at any time
- Played at least one official NBA match at any time.

By far the best known player to come through KK Budućnost ranks is Žarko Paspalj, Yugoslav national basketball team stalwart who had a basketball career that included successful stops all over Europe as well as a brief NBA stint in the late 1980s.

=== Notable players ===
- (Montenegro) Bojan Bakić
- (Montenegro) Goran Bošković
- (Montenegro) Nikola Bulatović
- (Montenegro) (Serbia) Žarko Čabarkapa
- (Montenegro) Vladimir Dašić
- (Montenegro) Vladimir Dragičević
- (Montenegro) Bojan Dubljević
- (Montenegro) Duško Ivanović
- (Montenegro) Nikola Ivanović
- (Montenegro) Goran Jeretin
- (Montenegro) Ivan Koljević
- (Montenegro) Vladimir Mihailović
- (Montenegro) Nenad Mijatović
- (Montenegro) Luka Pavićević
- (Montenegro) (Serbia) Aleksandar Pavlović
- (Montenegro) Aleksa Popović
- (Montenegro) Marko Popović
- (Montenegro) Gavrilo Pajović
- (Montenegro) Dejan Radonjić
- (Montenegro) Nemanja Radović
- (Montenegro) Balša Radunović
- (Montenegro) Žarko Rakočević
- (Montenegro) Boris Savović
- (Montenegro) Blagota Sekulić
- (Montenegro) Vlado Šćepanović
- (Montenegro) Sead Šehović
- (Montenegro) Mladen Šekularac
- (Montenegro) Slavko Vraneš
- (Montenegro) (Belgium) Nikola Vučević
- (Bosnia and Herzegovina) (Serbia) Nemanja Gordić
- (Australia) (Serbia) Aleks Marić
- (Canada) Jermaine Anderson
- (Canada) Kyle Landry
- (Canada) Owen Klassen
- (Croatia) Darko Planinić
- (Croatia) Robert Rikić
- (France) (United States) Edwin Jackson
- (Finland) (United States) Gerald Lee
- (Georgia (country)) Goga Bitadze
- (Guyana) (United States) Shawn James
- (Lithuania) Gintaras Kadžiulis
- (Lithuania) Donatas Tarolis
- (Nigeria) Deji Akindele
- (Slovenia) Aleksandar Ćapin
- (Slovenia) (Bosnia and Herzegovina) Hasan Rizvić
- (Slovenia) Alen Omić
- (Serbia) Haris Brkić
- (Serbia) Goran Ćakić
- (Serbia) Tadija Dragićević
- (Serbia) Nemanja Jaramaz
- (Serbia) Nikola Jestratijević
- (Serbia) Zoran Jovanović
- (Serbia) Bojan Krstović
- (Serbia) Vladimir Kuzmanović
- (Serbia) Vladimir Micov
- (Serbia) Dejan Milojević
- (Serbia) Saša Obradović
- (Serbia) Đuro Ostojić
- (Serbia) Nikola Otašević
- (Serbia) (Montenegro) Žarko Paspalj
- (Serbia) Ivan Paunić
- (Serbia) Miljan Pavković
- (Serbia) Igor Perović
- (Serbia) Igor Rakočević
- (Serbia) Marko Simonović
- (Serbia) (Montenegro) Bojan Subotić
- (Serbia) Dejan Tomašević
- (Serbia) Željko Topalović
- (Serbia) Milenko Topić
- (Serbia) Čedomir Vitkovac
- (United States) (Nigeria) Udoka Azubuike
- (United States) (Montenegro) Omar Cook
- (United States) (Kosovo) Justin Doellman
- (United States) Andre Brown
- (United States) Acie Earl
- (United States) Jerome James
- (United States) Julius Jenkins
- (United States) (Bulgaria) Dee Bost
- (United States) Kyle Gibson
- (United States) Doron Lamb
- (United States) J. R. Reynolds
- (United States) Marcus Williams
- (United States) Earl Clark
- (United States) Coty Clarke
- (United States) Norris Cole
- (United States) Sean Kilpatrick
- (United States) Scott Bamforth
- (United States) Hassan Martin
- (United States) (Montenegro) Justin Cobbs
- (United States) / (North Macedonia) Jacob Wiley
- (United States) McKinley Wright IV

=== Players at the NBA draft ===
Position	Player	Year	Round	Pick	Drafted by
PF	(Serbia) Žarko Čabarkapa	2003	1st round	17th	Phoenix Suns
SG/SF	(Montenegro) Aleksandar Pavlović	2003	1st round	19th	Utah Jazz
C	(Montenegro) Slavko Vraneš	2003	2nd round	39th	New York Knicks

=== Players who played in the NBA ===
- (Serbia) Žarko Paspalj
- (Serbia) Žarko Čabarkapa
- (Montenegro) Aleksandar Pavlović
- (Montenegro) Slavko Vraneš
- (Montenegro) Nikola Vučević
- (Montenegro) Omar Cook
- (Serbia) Igor Rakočević
- (United States) Andre Brown
- (United States) Acie Earl
- (United States) Jerome James
- (United States) Doron Lamb
- (United States) Marcus Williams
- (United States) Earl Clark
- (United States) Coty Clarke
- (United States) Norris Cole
- (United States) Sean Kilpatrick
- (United States) Rashad Vaughn
- (United States) Willie Reed
- (Georgia (country)) Goga Bitadze
- (United States) McKinley Wright IV

== Sponsorships ==
Official Shirt Sponsor	VOLI
Official Sport Clothing Manufacturer	Under Armour
Official Broadcaster	RTCG

== See also ==
- SD Budućnost Podgorica
- FK Budućnost Podgorica
- ŽKK Budućnost Podgorica
- Montenegrin Derby
- Montenegrin basketball clubs in European competitions
