= Zastal Zielona Góra =

- Nickname: Dziki (Boars)
- Leagues: Orlen Basket Liga; ENBL; Europe Cup
- Founded: 1946; 80 years ago
- Arena: CRS Hala Zielona Góra
- Capacity: 6,080
- Location: Zielona Góra, Poland
- Team colors: White, green
- Head coach: Arkadiusz Miloszewski
- Team captain: Andrzej Mazurczak
- Ownership: Sportowa Grono Joint Stock Company
- Championships: 5 Polish Championships; 2 Polish Cups; 2 Polish Supercup
- Retired numbers: 3 (5, 15, 55)
- Website: www.basketzg.pl//
Home	Away

Zastal Zielona Góra, officially Orlen Zastal Zielona Góra for sponsorship reasons, is a Polish professional basketball team that is based in Zielona Góra, Poland. The team plays in the Polish League. For past club sponsorship names, see the list below.

== History ==
The club was founded in the year 1946 under the name KS Zieloni, and in the following years the club had several name changes. Some of the names the team had included Stal Zielona Góra, Wagmo Zielona Góra and Lechia Zielona Góra. In the early 1960s the team consistently played in the third tier of Poland as Lechia. In the 1966–67 season, the club promoted to the second tier I Liga for the first time. In 1968 the team adopted the still famous club name Zastal Zielona Góra.

In the 1983–84 season, Zastal promoted to the top tier Polish Basketball League for the first time in club history. The club stayed there for a long time, however they had to leave the league in the 1999–2000 season due to financial problems. These problems caused Zastal to fall back all the way to the III Liga. In June 2001, Sports Joint Stock Company Grono became the owner of the team and a season later the club returned to the second tier I Liga.

In the 2009–10 season, Zastal finished in second place in the I Liga and was promoted back to the PLK. The golden years for the club would begin here. In the 2011–12 season, the team finished in third place in the Polish League. Due to sponsorship reasons, in the summer of 2012, the club changed its name from Zastal Zielona Góra to Stelmet Zielona Góra. In the 2012-13 season, the club won the Polish League championship, and thus qualified to play in the 2013–14 EuroLeague season, the highest continental level. The following years the club would consistently compete for the Polish national title while also playing in Europe.

On 24 February 2022, Zielona Góra terminated their membership with VTB United League due to the Russian invasion of Ukraine.

== Sponsorship naming ==
The club has had several denominations through the years due to its sponsorship:

- Wagmo Zielona Góra (1946–1949)
- Stal Zielona Góra (1950–1954)
- Zastal Zielona Góra (1955–1956, 1969–1992, 1995–1998, 2005–2007, 2008–2012)
- Lechia Zielona Góra (1957–1968)
- Zastal-Fortum Zielona Góra (1992–1995)
- Zastal-Dallas Zielona Góra (1998–1999)
- Zastal-Karl Eppe Zielona Góra (1999–2000)
- Intermarche-Zastal Zielona Góra (2000–2005)
- Wiecko-Zastal Zielona Góra (2007–2008)
- Stelmet Zielona Góra (2012–2018)
- Stelmet Enea Zielona Góra (2018–2020)
- Enea Zastal BC Zielona Góra (2020–2023)
- Enea Stelmet Zastal Zielona Góra (2023-present)

== Logos ==
(The previous official logo of Basket Zielona Góra.)

(The previous official logo of Basket Zielona Góra.)

== Achievements ==
- Polish League

Champions (5): 2012–13, 2014–15, 2015–16, 2016–17, 2019–20
Runner-up (4): 2013–14, 2020–21, 2025–26
Bronze (1): 2011–12

- Polish Cup

Champions (3): 2015, 2017, 2021
Runners-up (1): 2026

- Polish Supercup

Champions (3): 2015, 2020, 2021

=== Other achievements ===
- Gliwice, Poland Invitational Game

Winners (1): 2015

== Season by season ==
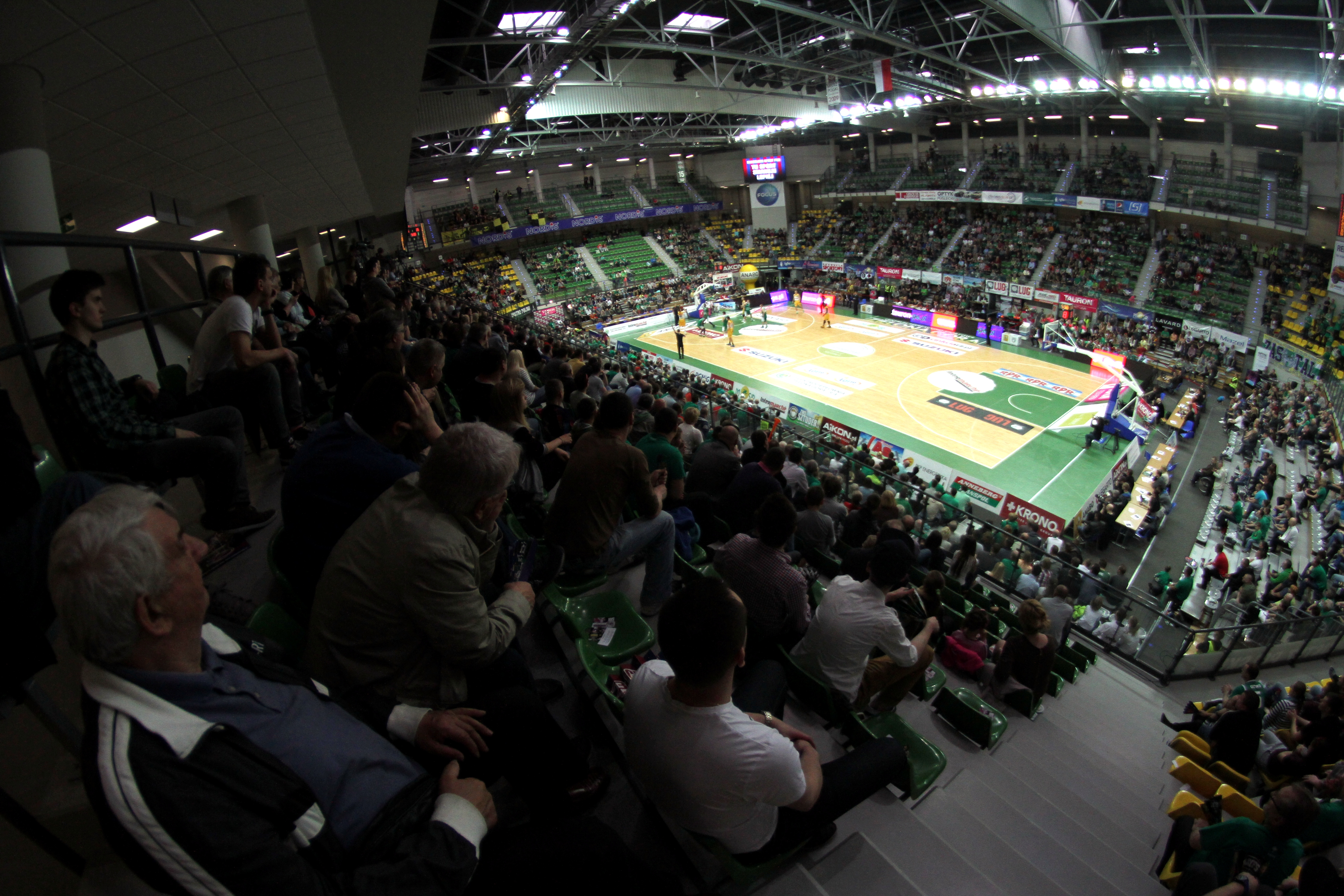
Home game of Zielona Góra in 2014

Through 2013–14 season, Stelmet Zielona Góra had played 18 seasons in the top Polish League (official name: Polska Liga Koszykówki). Altogether, through the 2013–14 season, the club had won 278 league games, and lost 343 league games.

Season	Tier	League	Pos.	W–L	Polish Cup	European competitions	
1984–85	1	PLK	9th	9–15			
1985–86	1	PLK	7th	14–15			
1986–87	1	PLK	8th	11–19			
1987–88	1	PLK	5th	14–15			
1988–89	1	PLK	8th	12–18			
1989–90	1	PLK	5th	17–16			
1990–91	1	PLK	7th	15–21			
1991–92	1	PLK	8th	14–24			
1992–93	1	PLK	4th	21–23			
1993–94	1	PLK	8th	15–24			
1994–95	1	PLK	10th	9–16			
1995–96	1	PLK	11th	7–20			
1998–99	1	PLK	14th	12–27			
1999–00	1	PLK	16th	6–31			
2000–01	2	I Liga	15th				
2001–02	3	II Liga	2nd				
2002–03	2	I Liga	8th				
2003–04	2	I Liga	11th				
2004–05	2	I Liga	6th				
2005–06	2	I Liga	8th				
2006–07	2	I Liga	4th				
2007–08	2	I Liga	5th				
2008–09	2	I Liga	5th				
2009–10	2	I Liga	2nd				
2010–11	1	PLK	9th	12–13			
2011–12	1	PLK	3rd	26–19	Runners-up		
2012–13	1	PLK	1st	30–14	Quarterfinalist	2 Eurocup	T16
2013–14	1	PLK	2nd	34–13	Quarterfinalist	1 Euroleague	RS
2013–14	1	PLK	2nd	34–13	Quarterfinalist	2 Eurocup	R32
2014–15	1	PLK	1st	33–10	Champion	1 Euroleague	QR1
2014–15	1	PLK	1st	33–10	Champion	2 Eurocup	RS
2015–16	1	PLK	1st	38–4	1st	1 Euroleague	RS
2015–16	1	PLK	1st	38–4	1st	2 Eurocup	QF
2016–17	1	PLK	1st	33–13	Champion	3 Champions League	RS
2016–17	1	PLK	1st	33–13	Champion	4 FIBA Europe Cup	R16
2017–18	1	PLK	4th	28–15	Runner-up	3 Champions League	R16
2018–19	1	PLK	4th	27–11	Quarterfinalist	R VTB United League	12th
2019–20	1	PLK	1st	19–3	Semifinalist	R VTB United League	–
2020–21	1	PLK	2nd	35–8	Champion	R VTB United League	QF
2021–22	1	PLK	5th	23–12	Quarterfinalist	R VTB United League	SUS
2022–23	1	PLK	9th	16–14		R ENBL	QF
2023–24	1	PLK	15th	8–22		R ENBL	RS
2024–25	1	PLK	11th	12–18			
2025–26	1	PLK	2nd	26–19			

== Players ==
=== Retired numbers ===
Zielona Góra retired numbers
No	Nat.	Player	Position	Tenure
5	(Poland)	Mariusz Kaczmarek	PG	1976–1980, 1985–1992
15	(United States Virgin Islands) (Puerto Rico)	Walter Hodge	PG	2010–2013
55	(Poland)	Łukasz Koszarek	PG	2013–2021

=== Current roster ===
Note: Flags indicate national team eligibility at FIBA-sanctioned events. Players may hold other non-FIBA nationalities not displayed.

Stelmet Zielona Góra roster
Players
Coaches

Pos.	No.	Nat.	Name	Ht.	Wt.	Age
G	0	(United States)	Garrison, Conley	1.85 m (6 ft 1 in)		27 – 19 February 1999
PG	1	(Poland)	Galewski, Jakub	1.83 m (6 ft 0 in)		19 – 26 March 2007
PG	3	(Poland)	Mazurczak, Andrzej (C)	1.88 m (6 ft 2 in)		32 – 27 December 1993
F	6	(Poland)	Majewski, Miłosz	1.99 m (6 ft 6 in)		19 – 8 January 2007
PF	7	(Poland)	Sulima, Krzysztof	2.02 m (6 ft 8 in)		36 – 5 January 1990
PG	8	(Poland)	Matczak, Filip	1.83 m (6 ft 0 in)		33 – 18 September 1993
SF	9	(France)	Denis, Gauthier	2.01 m (6 ft 7 in)		29 – 1 April 1997
SG	12	(United States)	Lewis, Marcus	1.96 m (6 ft 5 in)		34 – 16 February 1992
SF	13	(United States)	White, Trazarien	1.98 m (6 ft 6 in)		25 – 27 December 2000
C	21	(Serbia)	Brkić, Veljko	2.06 m (6 ft 9 in)		31 – 29 June 1995
PF	22	(United States)	Beech, Beau	2.03 m (6 ft 8 in)		32 – 1 March 1994
C	25	(Poland)	Wójcik, Jan	2.07 m (6 ft 9 in)		27 – 11 November 1999

Head coach

- (Poland) Arkadiusz Miloszewski

Assistant coach(es)

- (Poland) Kacper Traczyk
- (Poland) Grzegorz Kukiełka

Legend

- (C) Team captain
- Injured

- Roster
Updated: November 15, 2026

=== Notable players ===
Note: Flags indicate national team eligibility at FIBA-sanctioned events. Players may hold other non-FIBA nationalities not displayed.

Criteria

To appear in this section a player must have either:

- Set a club record or won an individual award while at the club
- Played at least one official international match for their national team at any time
- Played at least one official NBA match at any time.

- (Poland) Kamil Chanas
- (Poland) Łukasz Koszarek
- (Denmark) Gabriel Lundberg
- (Georgia (country)) Quinton Hosley
- (Latvia) Roberts Štelmahers
- (Lithuania) Gvidonas Markevičius
- (Lithuania) Martynas Gecevičius
- (Nigeria) Gani Lawal
- (Serbia) Miloš Babić
- (Serbia) Dejan Borovnjak
- (Serbia) Oliver Stević
- (United States Virgin Islands) Walter Hodge
- (United States) R. T. Guinn
- (United States) Chris Burgess
- (United States) George King
- (United States) Geoffrey Groselle

=== Coaches ===
- (Poland) Tomasz Herkt (2008–2011)
- (Serbia) Mihailo Uvalin (2011–2014)
- (North Macedonia) Sašo Filipovski (2014–2016)
- (Poland) Artur Gronek (2016–2017)
- (Slovenia) Andrej Urlep (2017–2018)
- (Montenegro) Igor Jovović (2018–2019)
- (Slovenia) Žan Tabak (2019–2021)
- (Serbia) Oliver Vidin (2021–2023)
- (Slovenia) David Dedek (2023–2024)
- (Serbia) Vladimir Jovanović (2024–2025)
- (Poland) Arkadiusz Miłoszewski (2025–)
