= 2022 Polish Basketball Cup =

58th edition of Poland's national cup competition for men basketball teams

Polish Basketball Cup
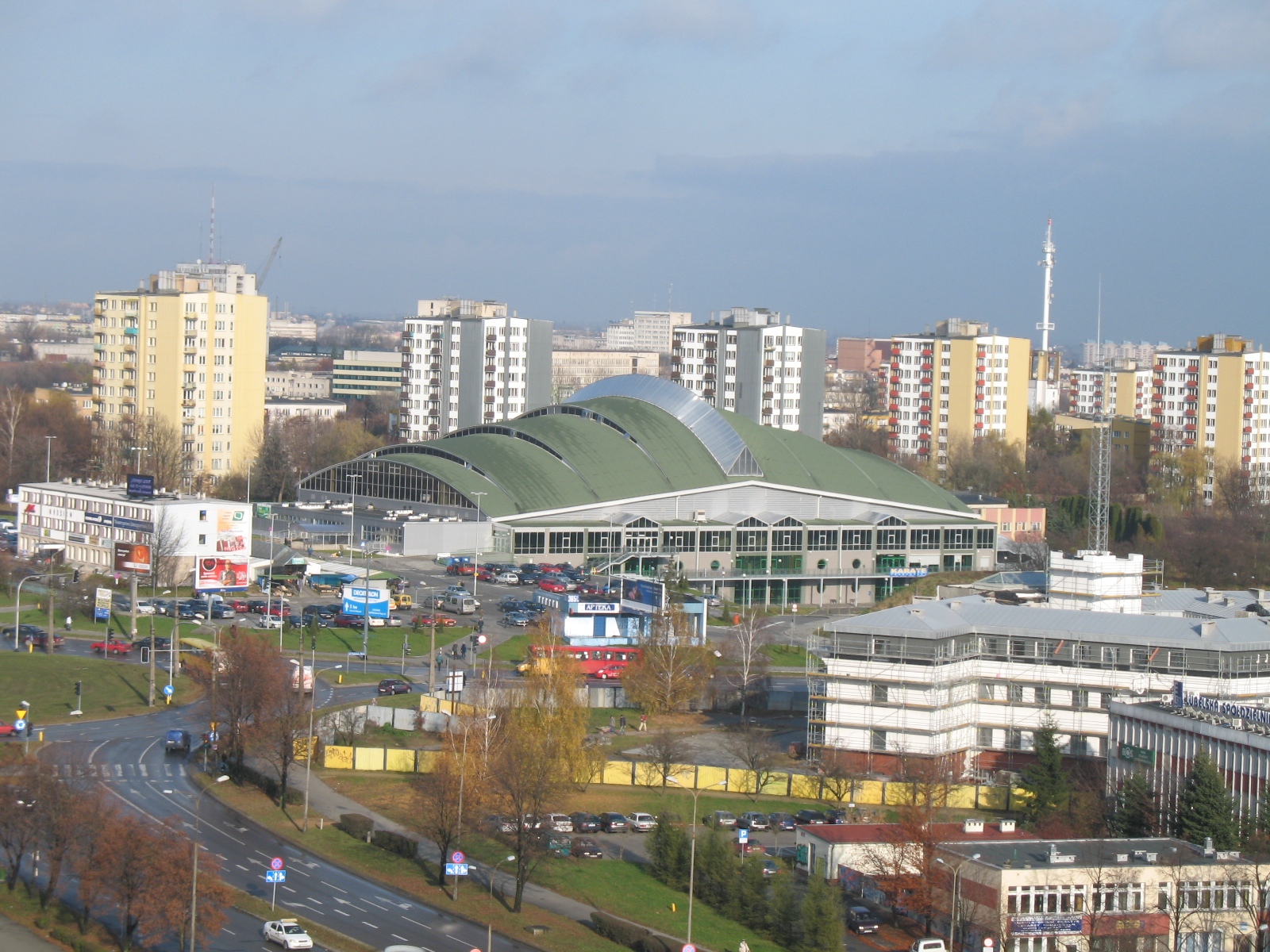
- The Globus, venue for the tournament
- Season: 2021–22
- Duration: 17–20 February
- Games played: 7
- Teams: 8

Regular season
- Season MVP: (Poland) Jakub Garbacz

Finals
- Champions: BM Slam Stal Ostrów Wlkp. (2nd title)
- Runners-up: Polski Cukier Pszczółka Start Lublin
- Semi-finalists: King Szczecin, Śląsk Wrocław

The 2022 Suzuki Polish Basketball Cup (Polish: Puchar Polski 2022) was the 59th edition of Poland's national cup competition for men basketball teams. It is managed by the Polish Basketball League (PLK) and was held in Lublin, in the Globus.

== Qualified teams ==
The eight participants qualified for the tournament after the first half of the 2021–22 PLK season. The highest-placed four teams would play the lowest-seeded teams in the quarter-finals. As host of the tournament, Start Lublin gained automatic qualification.

== Bracket ==
Quarterfinals; 17–18 February
Anwil Włocławek	94
King Szczecin	98
Polski Cukier Pszczółka Start Lublin	82
Zastal Zielona Góra	81
Twarde Pierniki Toruń	78
BM Slam Stal Ostrów Wlkp.	84
Grupa Sierleccy Czarni Słupsk	77
Śląsk Wrocław	88

Semifinals; 19 February
King Szczecin	70
Polski Cukier Pszczółka Start Lublin	77
BM Slam Stal Ostrów Wlkp.	94
Śląsk Wrocław	87

Final; 20 February
Polski Cukier Pszczółka Start Lublin	76
BM Slam Stal Ostrów Wlkp.	83

== Quarterfinals ==
17 February 2022	Anwil Włocławek	94–98(OT)	King Szczecin	Lublin
18:10 CET (UTC+01:00)	Scoring by quarter: 25–15, 33–20, 18–26, 10–25, Overtime: 8–12
Polsat Sport	Pts: Mathews 25; Rebs: Petrasek 12; Asts: three players 3 PIR: Mathews 21	Report	Pts: Schenk 21; Rebs: Langevine 9 Asts: Schenk 8 PIR: Schenk 24	Arena: Globus; Referees: Dariusz Zapolski, Adam Wierzman, Tomasz Szczurewski

17 February 2022	Polski Cukier Pszczółka Start Lublin	82–81(OT)	Zastal Zielona Góra	Lublin
20:40 CET (UTC+01:00)	Scoring by quarter: 18–16, 16–15, 21–18, 16–22, Overtime: 11–10
Polsat Sport	Pts: Scott 21; Rebs: Melvin, Taylor 8 Asts: Scott 9 PIR: Scott 22	Report	Pts: Apić 25; Rebs: Apić 13; Asts: Mazurczak 7 PIR: Apić 30	Arena: Globus; Referees: Michał Proc, Łukasz Jankowski, Maciej Dębowski

18 February 2022	Twarde Pierniki Toruń	78–84	BM Slam Stal Ostrów Wlkp.	Lublin
18:10 CET (UTC+01:00)	Scoring by quarter: 9–21, 23–21, 20–21, 26–21
Polsat Sport Extra	Pts: Diduszko 18; Rebs: Cel 9 Asts: Rogic 8 PIR: Cel 19	Report	Pts: Simmons 18; Rebs: Kulig, Young 9 Asts: Palmer Jr. 4 PIR: Simmons 22	Arena: Globus; Referees: Marek Maliszewski, Robert Mordal, Mariusz Nawrocki

18 February 2022	Grupa Sierleccy Czarni Słupsk	77–88	Śląsk Wrocław	Lublin
20:40 CET (UTC+01:00)	Scoring by quarter: 23–28, 19–18, 20–23, 15–19
Polsat Sport News	Pts: Klassen 15; Rebs: Young 8 Asts: Klassen 11; PIR: Klassen 21	Report	Pts: Trice 28; Rebs: Kanter 7 Asts: Trice 9 PIR: Trice 34	Arena: Globus; Referees: Piotr Pastusiak, Michał Chrakowiecki, Karol Nowak

== Semifinals ==
19 February 2022	King Szczecin	70–77	Polski Cukier Pszczółka Start Lublin	Lublin
15:00 CET (UTC+01:00)	Scoring by quarter: 19–25, 14–12, 14–16, 26–24
Polsat Sport Extra	Pts: Davis 18; Rebs: Langevine 9 Asts: Matczak 5 PIR: Langevine 23	Report	Pts: Scott 28; Rebs: Taylor 9 Asts: Scott 5 PIR: Scott 28	Arena: Globus; Referees: Marek Maliszewski, Łukasz Jankowski, Michał Chrakowiecki

19 February 2022	BM Slam Stal Ostrów Wlkp.	94–87	Śląsk Wrocław	Lublin
19:00 CET (UTC+01:00)	Scoring by quarter: 23–24, 31–24, 22–24, 18–15
Polsat Sport News	Pts: Florence 28; Rebs: Drechsel 6 Asts: Florence 4 PIR: Florence 28	Report	Pts: Dziewa 23; Rebs: Kanter 16; Asts: T.Trice 9 PIR: Dziewa 25	Arena: Globus; Referees: Piotr Pastusiak, Michał Proc, Karol Nowak

== Finals ==
20 February 2022	Polski Cukier Pszczółka Start Lublin	76–83	BM Slam Stal Ostrów Wlkp.	Lublin
18:00 CET (UTC+01:00)	Scoring by quarter: 20–10, 21–24, 14–28, 21–21
Polsat Sport Extra	Pts: Kostrzewski 20; Rebs: Szymański 10; Asts: Scott 7 PIR: Kostrzewski 20	Report	Pts: Garbacz 20; Rebs: Kulig 7 Asts: Palmer Jr. 4 PIR: Garbacz 19	Arena: Globus; Referees: Piotr Pastusiak, Łukasz Jankowski, Robert Mordal

Starters:			Pts	Reb	Ast
PG	0	(United States) Michaelyn Scott	11	5	7
SG	22	(United States) Elijah Wilson	18	2	1
SF	31	(Poland) Mateusz Kostrzewski	20	6	1
PF	2	(United States) Cleveland Melvin	5	4	1
C	1	(United States) Jimmie Taylor	2	6	3
Reserves:					
G/F	3	(Poland) Mateusz Dziemba	5	4	5
G/F	6	(Poland) Mikołaj Stopierzyński	DNP		
G	7	(Poland) Bartłomiej Pelczar	2	3	2
F	10	(Poland) Bartosz Ciechociński	DNP		
G/F	11	(Poland) Karol Obarek	DNP		
PF	18	(Poland) Damian Jeszke	7	2	2
C	19	(Poland) Roman Szymański	6	10	0
Head coach:
(Polish Basketball Federation) Tane Spasew

Start Lublin	Stal Ostrów Wielkopolski

Start Lublin	Statistics	Stal Ostrów Wielkopolski
22/42 (52.4%)	2 point field goals	14/25 (56.0%)
10/30 (33.3%)	3 point field goals	12/39 (30.8%)
2/6 (33.3%)	Free throws	19/25 (76.0%)
16	Offensive rebounds	11
29	Defensive rebounds	25
45	Total rebounds	36
22	Assists	14
0	Steals	5
12	Turnovers	7
3	Blocks	5

Starters:			Pts	Reb	Ast
PG	2	(United States) James Florence	19	1	3
SG	30	(Poland) Jakub Garbacz	20	4	0
SF	7	(United States) Trey Drechsel	5	5	0
PF	8	(United States) Michael Young	6	6	2
C	77	(Poland) Damian Kulig	2	7	3
Reserves:					
SG	1	(United States) James Palmer Jr.	12	5	4
PG	3	(United States) Kobi Simmons	9	3	2
F/C	5	(Sweden) Denzel Andersson	7	2	0
F/C	10	(Poland) Igor Wadowski	DNP		
PF	12	(Poland) Jarosław Mokros	3	2	0
F	18	(Poland) Jakub Wojciechowski	0	0	0
F	55	(Poland) Michał Pluta	DNP		
Head coach:
(Croatian Basketball Federation) Igor Miličić

2022 Polish Basketball Cup Winners
BM Slam Stal Ostrów Wlkp.
(2nd title)

== See also ==
- 2021–22 PLK season
