= 2021 FIBA Europe Cup Finals =

2021 FIBA Europe Cup Final
- Event: 2020–21 FIBA Europe Cup
Stal Ostrów Wielkopolski	Ironi Nes Ziona
(Poland)	(Israel)
74	82
- Date: 25 May 2021
- Venue: Menora Mivtachim Arena, Tel Aviv
- Attendance: 4,000

The 2021 FIBA Europe Cup Final was the concluding game of the 2020–21 FIBA Europe Cup season. The final was played as the culmination of the Final Four which was held at the Menora Mivtachim Arena in Tel Aviv.

== Venue ==
The game was originally scheduled to be in the Drive in Arena, but this was changed to the Menora Mivtachim Arena to allow for more fans.

Tel Aviv	2021 FIBA Europe Cup Finals (Europe)
Menora Mivtachim Arena	2021 FIBA Europe Cup Finals (Europe)
Capacity: 10,383	2021 FIBA Europe Cup Finals (Europe)

== Road to the final ==
Note: In the table, the score of the finalist is given first (H = home; A = away).

(Poland) Stal Ostrów Wielkopolski		Round	(Germany) s.Oliver Würzburg	
Group C: Pos / Team / Pld / Pts; 1 / (Poland) Stal Ostrów Wielkopolski / 3 / 6; 2 / (Israel) Ironi Nes Ziona / 3 / 5; 3 / (Hungary) Szolnoki Olajbányász / 3 / 4; 4 / (Portugal) Sporting CP / 3 / 3; Source: FIBA Europe Cup		Regular season	Group C: Pos / Team / Pld / Pts; 1 / (Poland) Stal Ostrów Wielkopolski / 3 / 6; 2 / (Israel) Ironi Nes Ziona / 3 / 5; 3 / (Hungary) Szolnoki Olajbányász / 3 / 4; 4 / (Portugal) Sporting CP / 3 / 3; Source: FIBA Europe Cup	
Opponent	Score	Play-offs	Opponent	Score
(Netherlands) Heroes Den Bosch	83–92	Round of 16	(Ukraine) Kyiv-Basket	90–76
(Belgium) Belfius Mons-Hainaut	73–66	Quarter-finals	(Greece) Iraklis	105–80
(Romania) Oradea	77–66	Semi-finals	(Russia) Parma	81–80

== Game ==
25 April 2021	Stal Ostrów Wielkopolski (Poland)	74–82	(Israel) Ironi Ness Ziona	Tel Aviv, Israel
(UTC+2)	Scoring by quarter: 22–26, 13–16, 30–17, 9–23
	Pts: Garbacz 19; Rebs: Ogden 10; Asts: Kell 7 Eff: Kell 14	Boxscore	Pts: Angola 15; Rebs: Meyinsse 13; Asts: Miller 9 Eff: Meyinsse 25	Arena: Menora Mivtachim Arena; Attendance: 4,000; Referees: Panagiotis Anastopoulos (GRE), Andris Aunkrogers (LAT), Martin Horozov (BUL)

Starters:			Pts	Reb	Ast
PG	7	(United States) Trey Kell	12	3	7
SG	34	(United States) Christopher Smith	11	5	6
SF	5	(Sweden) Denzel Andersson	12	2	1
PF	30	(United States) Jakub Grabacz	19	2	0
C	13	(Croatia) Josip Sobin	4	7	2
Reserves:					
G	0	(United States) James Florence	9	2	4
G	4	(Poland) Lukasz Wojciechowski	DNP		
G	8	(Poland) Szymon Ryzek	DNP		
PG	11	(Georgia (country)) Taurean Green	0	0	0
SG	12	(Poland) Jaroslaw Mokros	DNP		
F	21	(Poland) Maciej Kucharek	DNP		
F	35	(United States) Mark Ogden Jr.	4	10	1
Head coach:
(Croatian Basketball Federation) Igor Miličić

Stal	Ness Ziona

Stal	Statistics	Ness Ziona
21/64 (33%)	2-pt field goals	28/69 (41%)
12/37 (32%)	3-pt field goals	8/26 (31%)
20/26 (77%)	Free throws	18/23 (78%)
14	Offensive rebounds	16
26	Defensive rebounds	33
40	Total rebounds	49
16	Assists	24
9	Turnovers	9
2	Steals	5
2	Blocks	3
21	Fouls	21

Starters:			Pts	Reb	Ast
PG	2	(United States) Patrick Miller	9	3	9
SG	2	(United States) Wayne Selden Jr.	13	4	6
SF	21	(Colombia) Braian Angola	15	9	2
PF	6	(Israel) Tal Dunne	0	2	4
C	55	(United States) Jerome Meyinsse	14	13	2
Reserves:					
SF	8	(Israel) Lior Carreira	10	7	0
PG	11	(Israel) Amit Ebo	DNP		
F/C	12	(Uruguay) Uriel Trocki	DNP		
F	15	(Israel) Nimrod Levi	21	3	1
G	28	(Israel) Raviv Limonad	DNP		
SG	80	(Israel) Or Cornelius	DNP		
Head coach:
(USA Basketball) Brad Greenberg

- Team captains (C): (Poland) Jaroslaw Mokros (Stal Ostrów) and (Israel) Tal Dunne (Ironi Ness Ziona)

== See also ==
- 2021 EuroLeague Final Four
- 2021 Basketball Champions League Final Four
