= 2022–23 European North Basketball League =

Second season of the European North Basketball League

European North Basketball League
- Season: 2022–23
- Duration: 22 November 22–12 April 2023
- Games played: 59
- Teams: 15
- TV partners: Best4Sport TV, Emocje.tv

Regular season
- Season MVP: (United States) Zac Cuthbertson

Finals
- Champions: (Poland) BM Stal Ostrów Wielkopolski (1st title)
- Runners-up: (Lithuania) BC Wolves
- Third place: (Poland) Start Lublin
- Fourth place: (Poland) King Szczecin
- Finals MVP: (Poland) Damian Kulig

Records
- Biggest home win: Kalev/Cramo 105–69 TalTech/Optibet (22 December 2022)
- Biggest away win: Valmiera Glass Via 78–108 Valmiera Glass Via (28 December 2022)
- Highest scoring: Trefl Sopot 92–100 Ironi Ness Ziona (1 December 2022)
- Winning streak: King Szczecin 6 games
- Losing streak: Valmiera Glass VIA 7 games

2022–23 European North Basketball League was the second season of the European North Basketball League, a regional basketball competition patronised by FIBA.

In this season were 15 teams from 8 countries (Poland, Lithuania, Latvia, Estonia, Czech Republic, Ukraine, Kosovo and Israel). They were divided into two groups.

Ukraine, Israel and Kosovo had a debutant in this competition, while Russian and Belarus teams were banned from competition this season, due to 2022 Russian invasion of Ukraine.

== Teams ==
1st, 2nd, 3rd etc. - positions in national championships.

Regular season
(Poland) Slam Stal Ostrów Wielkopolski (5th)	(Poland) Polski Cukier Start Lublin (12th)	(Lithuania) Šiauliai (4th)	(Kosovo) Sigal Prishtina (3rd)
(Poland) Zastal Zielona Góra (6th)	(Estonia) Tartu Ülikool Maks & Moorits(2nd)	(Lithuania) Wolves	(Latvia) Valmiera Glass Via (5th)
(Poland) King Szczecin (8th)	(Estonia) Kalev/Cramo (3rd)	(Czech Republic) Brno (3rd)	~~(Serbia) Dunav (12th)~~
(Poland) Trefl Sopot (10th)	(Estonia) TalTech/Optibet (4th)	(Israel) Ironi Ness Ziona (10th)	(Ukraine) Budivelnik (2nd)

NOTE: KK Dunav from Serbia withdrew due to internal political reasons.

== Regular season ==
=== Group A ===
Pos	Team	Pld	W	L	PF	PA	PD	Pts	Qualification	LUB	BUD	ZZG	SIG	KAL	ŠIA	TTO
1	(Poland) Polski Cukier Start Lublin	6	5	1	505	447	+58	11	Advance to Playoffs	—	82–68	88–94	—	—	83–75	83–68
2	(Ukraine) Budivelnyk	6	5	1	472	415	+57	11	Advance to Playoffs	—	—	—	85–62	—	—	73–59
3	(Poland) Zastal Zielona Góra	6	4	2	488	478	+10	10	Advance to Playoffs	—	63–74	—	75–89	—	78–73	—
4	(Kosovo) Sigal Prishtina	6	2	4	434	468	−34	8	Advance to Playoffs	69–89	—	—	—	50–61	—	73–91
5	(Estonia) Kalev/Cramo	6	2	4	455	436	+19	8		73–80	76–84	69–74	—	—	—	105–69
6	(Lithuania) Šiauliai	6	2	4	453	492	−39	8		—	73–88	—	67–91	79–71	—	—
7	(Estonia) TalTech/Optibet	6	1	5	453	524	−71	7		—	—	85–104	—	—	81–86	—

Source: enbleague.eu

=== Group B ===
Pos	Team	Pld	W	L	PF	PA	PD	Pts	Qualification	SZC	OST	WOL	INZ	TRE	TAR	BRN	VAL
1	(Poland) King Szczecin	7	6	1	584	533	+51	13	Advance to Playoffs	—	—	—	89–86	81–77	78–73	—	—
2	(Poland) BM Stal Ostrów Wielkopolski	7	5	2	569	493	+76	12	Advance to Playoffs	56–72	—	—	92–76	88–65	84–65	—	—
3	(Lithuania) Wolves	7	5	2	572	531	+41	12	Advance to Playoffs	87–84	85–75	—	—	—	—	—	89–60
4	(Israel) Ironi Ness Ziona	7	5	2	630	570	+60	12	Advance to Playoffs	—	—	90–84	—	—	—	94–80	87–55
5	(Poland) Trefl Sopot	7	4	3	600	582	+18	11		—	—	89–86	92–100	—	—	93–77	—
6	(Estonia) Tartu Ülikool Maks & Moorits	7	2	5	552	568	−16	9		—	—	77–79	78–97	72–76	—	77–75	110–79
7	(Czech Republic) Brno	7	1	6	515	576	−61	8		78–87	59–80	56–62	—	—	—	—	—
8	(Latvia) Valmiera Glass Via	7	0	7	502	671	−169	7		76–93	71–94	—	—	78–108	—	83–90	—

Source: enbleague.eu

== Playoffs ==
Each tie in the quarter-finals phase is played over two legs. The winning teams qualify for the Final Four tournament.

=== Quarterfinals ===
Team 1	Agg.	Team 2	1st leg	2nd leg
Ironi Ness Ziona (Israel)	155–170	(Poland) Start Lublin	77–90	78–80
Wolves (Lithuania)	167–162	(Ukraine) Budivelnyk	80–83	87–79
Zielona Góra (Poland)	177–195	(Poland) BM Stal Ostrów Wielkopolski	97–94	80–101
Sigal Prishtina (Kosovo)	142–149	(Poland) King Szczecin	64–64	78–85

==== Ironi Ness Ziona vs. Start Lublin ====
8 March 2023	Ironi Ness Ziona (Israel)	77–90	(Poland) Start Lublin	Ness Ziona
18:00 (GMT)	Scoring by quarter: 19–17, 20-17, 18–28, 20–28
	Pts: Bey 28; Rebs: Bey 11; Asts: Cooper 11	Box Score	Pts: Melvin 22; Rebs: Čavars 8 Asts: Smith 6	Arena: Lev Hamoshava; Attendance: 700

20 March 2023	Start Lublin (Poland)	80–78	(Israel) Ironi Ness Ziona	Lublin
18:00 (GMT)	Scoring by quarter: 27–18, 17-23, 13–21, 23-16
	Pts: Smith, DeVoe 14; Rebs: Čavars 14; Asts: Smith 4	Box Score	Pts: Buchanan 21; Rebs: Bey, Harrell 7 Asts: Cooper 12	Arena: Globus Arena; Attendance: 600; Referees: A. Petrovs, M. Skorek, J. Brūveris

==== Wolves vs. Budivelnyk ====
11 March 2023	Wolves (Lithuania)	80–83	(Ukraine) Budivelnyk	Alytus
17:20 (GMT)	Scoring by quarter: 18-20, 20-23, 21–22, 21-18
	Pts: Caver 24; Rebs: Miniotas 7 Asts: Juškevičius 7	Box Score	Pts: Bliznyuk 20; Rebs: Bliznyuk 11; Asts: Goodwin 5	Arena: Alytus Arena; Attendance: 2411; Referees: O. Lucis, A. Urbanovic, D. Povoroznyuk

18 March 2023	Budivelnyk (Ukraine)	79–87(OT)	(Lithuania) Wolves	Veroli
19:30 (GMT)	Scoring by quarter: 17-22, 23-15, 14–16, 17-21, Overtime: 8-13
	Pts: Bliznyuk 23; Rebs: Grant 11; Asts: Bliznyuk 4	Box Score	Pts: Caver 28; Rebs: Buckner 16; Asts: Caver 5	Arena: Pala Coccia; Attendance: 500; Referees: G. Saliņš, A. Borusas, O. Dotsenko

==== Zielona Góra vs. Stal Ostrów Wielkopolski ====
12 March 2023	Zielona Góra (Poland)	97–94	(Poland) BM Stal Ostrów Wielkopolski	Zielona Góra
16:00 (GMT)	Scoring by quarter: 24-23, 16-25, 21-15, 36-31
	Pts: Alford 27; Rebs: Zečević 8 Asts: Alford 13	Box Score	Pts: Đurišić 17; Rebs: Šķēle, Kulig 7 Asts: Šķēle 19	Arena: CRS Hall; Attendance: 1557; Referees: P. Pastusiak, M. Chrakowiecki, B. Podkowińska

21 March 2023	BM Stal Ostrów Wielkopolski (Poland)	101–80	(Poland) Zielona Góra	Ostrów Wielkopolski
19:00 (GMT)	Scoring by quarter: 34-23, 16-26, 31-14, 20-17
	Pts: Đurišić 18; Rebs: Đurišić, Zębski 7 Asts: Šķēle 12	Box Score	Pts: Alford 26; Rebs: Hadžibegović, Wójcik 8 Asts: Żołnierewicz 4	Arena: Arena Ostrów; Attendance: 2559; Referees: T. Trawicki, E. Matuszewska, M. Dębowski

==== Sigal Prishtina vs. King Szczecin ====
8 March 2023	Sigal Prishtina (Kosovo)	64–64	(Poland) King Szczecin	Pristina
19:00 (GMT)	Scoring by quarter: 13–13, 9-8, 21-19, 21–24
	Pts: Gach 19; Rebs: Thomas 9 Asts: four players 2	Box Score	Pts: Kostrzewski 18; Rebs: Cuthbertson 7 Asts: Mazurczak 10	Arena: Palace of Youth and Sports; Attendance: 2500; Referees: N. Shabani, T. Langowski, M. Scholze

20 March 2023	King Szczecin (Poland)	85–78	(Kosovo) Sigal Prishtina	Szczecin
18:00 (GMT)	Scoring by quarter: 21–17, 20-25, 23-12, 21–24
	Pts: Cuthbertson 18; Rebs: Fayne 9 Asts: Andrzej Mazurczak 10	Box Score	Pts: Thomas 17; Rebs: Thomas, Debisschop 6 Asts: Gach, Thomas 4	Arena: Netto Arena; Attendance: 1712; Referees: A. Aunkrogers, E. Binders-Čoders, P. Gajdosz

== Final Four ==
Final Four will take place in Arena Ostrów on April 11–12.

Semifinals
11 April
(Poland) King Szczecin	55
(Lithuania) BC Wolves	58
11 April
(Poland) BM Stal Ostrów Wielkopolski	86
(Poland) Start Lublin	74

Championship game
12 April
(Lithuania) BC Wolves	66
(Poland) BM Stal Ostrów Wielkopolski	70
Third place game
12 April
(Poland) King Szczecin	62
(Poland) Start Lublin	86

=== Semifinals ===
11 April 2023	King Szczecin (Poland)	55–58	(Lithuania) BC Wolves	Ostrów Wielkopolski
16:00 (GMT)	Scoring by quarter: 12–11, 17–19, 13–12, 13–16
	Pts: Brown, Meier 12; Rebs: Fayne 7 Asts: Mazurczak 5	Box Score	Pts: Caver 19; Rebs: Žukauskas 11; Asts: Caver 3	Arena: Arena Ostrów; Attendance: 200; Referees: Oskars Lucis (LVA), Michal Chrakowiecki (POL), Gabrielius Simonavičius (LTU)

11 April 2023	BM Stal Ostrów Wielkopolski (Poland)	86–74	(Poland) Start Lublin	Ostrów Wielkopolski
19:00 (GMT)	Scoring by quarter: 22–12, 17–22, 22–21, 25–19
	Pts: three players 15; Rebs: Kulig 10; Asts: Šķēle 11	Box Score	Pts: Barnies 21; Rebs: three players 5 Asts: Smith 4	Arena: Arena Ostrów; Attendance: 2354; Referees: Marcin Kowalski (POL), Mihkel Manniste (EST), Bartlomiej Kucharski (POL)

=== Third place game ===
12 April 2023	King Szczecin (Poland)	62–86	(Poland) Start Lublin	Ostrów Wielkopolski
16:00 (GMT)	Scoring by quarter: 25–15, 17–21, 23–4, 21–22
	Pts: Brown 15; Rebs: Cuthbertson 7 Asts: Brown, Hamilton 4	Box Score	Pts: Griciūnas 13; Rebs: Griciūnas 12; Asts: Smith 6	Arena: Arena Ostrów; Attendance: 100; Referees: Michał Chrakowiecki (POL), Mihkel Manniste (EST), Bartlomiej Kucharski (POL)

=== Final ===
12 April 2023	BC Wolves (Lithuania)	66–70	(Poland) BM Stal Ostrów Wielkopolski	Ostrów Wielkopolski
19:00 (GMT)
	Pts: Miniotas 13; Rebs: Miniotas, Taylor 10; Asts: Caver 5	Box Score	Pts: Garbacz 22; Rebs: Đurišić 8 Asts: Šķēle 8	Arena: Arena Ostrów; Attendance: 2367; Referees: Marcin Kowalski (POL), Oskars Lucis (LVA), Gabrielius Simonavičius (LTU)

== Awards ==
=== Season awards ===
Award	Player	Team	Ref.
Regular Season MVP	(United States) Zac Cuthbertson	(Poland) Wilki Morskie Szczecin	
Finals MVP	(Poland) Damian Kulig	(Poland) BM Stal Ostrów Wielkopolski	
