= Andrzej Urban =

Polish basketball coach

Stal Ostrów Wielkopolski
- Position: Head coach
- League: PLK

Personal information
- Born: November 9, 1991 (age 35) Przemyśl, Poland
- Coaching career: 2018–present

Career history

Coaching
- 2022–present: BM Stal Ostrów Wielkopolski
- 2022–: Poland (assistant)

Career highlights
- As head coach: Polish Basketball Supercup champion (2022); European North Basketball League champion (2023); As assistant coach: Polish Basketball League champion (2021); 2× Polish Basketball Cup winner (2019, 2022)

Andrzej Urban (born November 9, 1991) is a Polish professional basketball coach. He is the current head coach of BM Stal Ostrów Wielkopolski of the Polish Basketball League.

== Coaching career ==
Urban was a professional basketball player for eight years, mostly playing in lower level Polish leagues. During 2016–17 season Urban was player-coach for AZS AGH Kraków In 2017–18 season he became an assistant for Wojciech Kamiński in Rosa Radom team. In 2018 he joined Kamiński's staff in BM Stal Ostrów Wielkopolski.

During the years as an assistant, Urban worked alongside such coaches as Wojciech Kamiński, Jacek Winnicki, Łukasz Majewski and Igor Miličić. In the summer of 2022, after Miličić left the team, Urban became the new head coach of BM Stal Ostrów Wielkopolski. During the debut season Urban led his team to Polish Basketball Supercup and European North Basketball League titles, and the bronze medal in Poland Basketball League.

On 3 March 2023 Urban signed a new two-year contract extension with the team.

== National team ==
In 2022 fall Urban became Milicic's assistant in Poland national team
