= Skele =

Skele is a surname. Notable people with the surname include:

- Aigars Šķēle (born 1992), basketball player
- Andris Šķēle (born 1957), Latvian politician and business oligarch
- Armands Šķēle (born 1983), Latvian basketball player
- William Skele (disambiguation), multiple people
