= Nemanja Đurišić =

Montenegrin basketball player

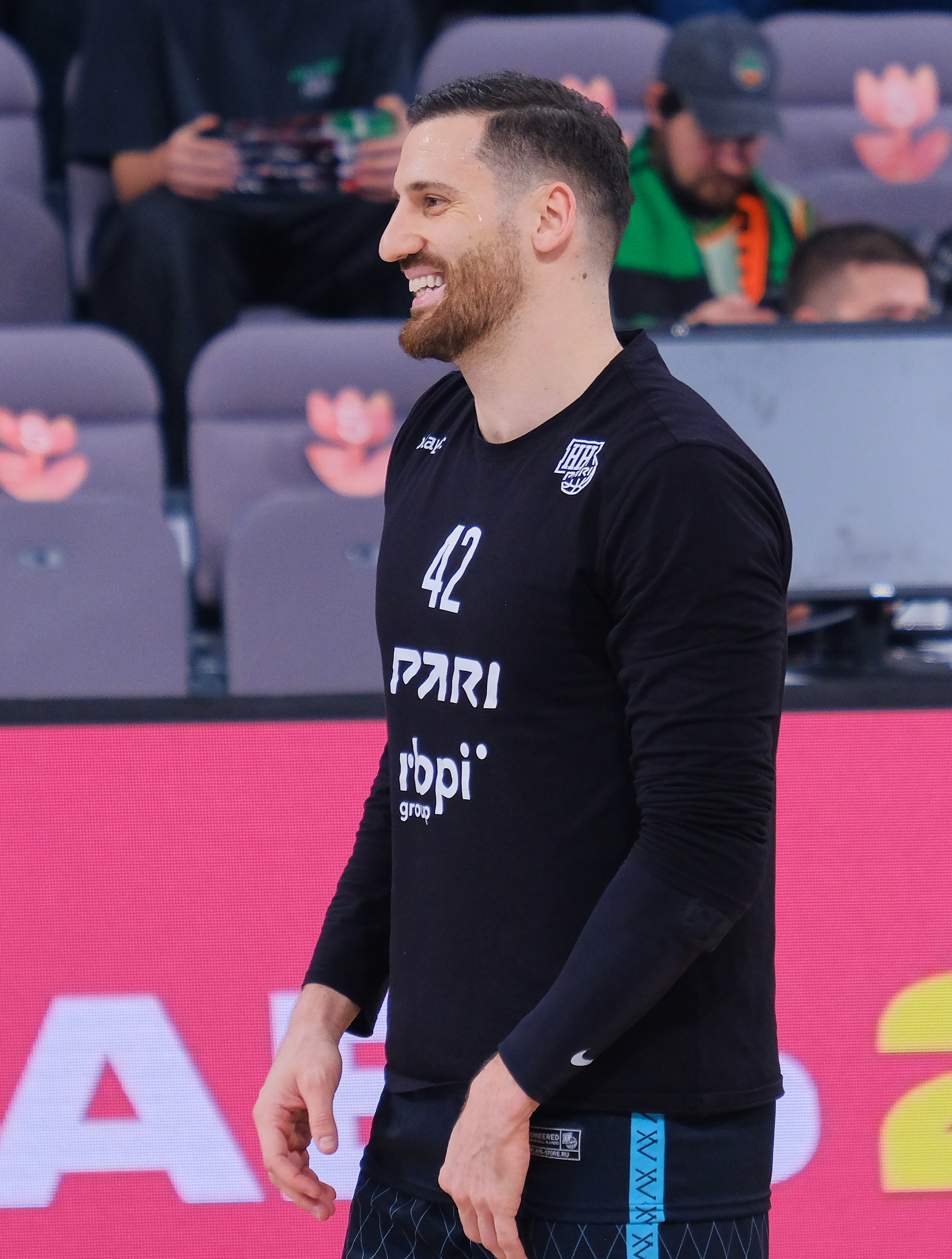

Tindastóll
- Position: Forward
- League: Úrvalsdeild karla ENBL

Personal information
- Born: February 23, 1992 (age 34) Titograd, SFR Yugoslavia
- Listed height: 2.03 m (6 ft 8 in)
- Listed weight: 100 kg (220 lb)

Career information
- High school: South Kent School (South Kent, Connecticut)
- College: Georgia (2011–2015)
- Playing career: 2015–present

Career history
- 2015–2017: Zielona Góra
- 2017–2018: Bonn
- 2018–2019: Oostende
- 2019–2020: Beşiktaş
- 2020–2022: Estudiantes
- 2022–2024: Stal Ostrów Wielkopolski
- 2024–2025: BC Nizhny Novgorod
- 2025–2026: Kumamoto Volters
- 2026: Mitteldeutscher BC
- 2026–present: Tindastóll

Career highlights
- ENBL winner (2023); 2× Polish League champion (2016, 2017); Pro Basketball League champion (2019); Polish Basketball Cup winner (2017); 2× Polish Supercup winner (2015, 2022)

Nemanja Đurišić (born February 23, 1992) is a Montenegrin professional basketball player for Tindastóll of the Icelandic Úrvalsdeild karla and the European North Basketball League. Đurišić is also currently a member of the Montenegrin national team and during his college years he played for the University of Georgia in the United States. He can play both small or power forward position. He is one of the few players from Montenegro who completed all 4 years of basketball scholarship at a university in the United States.

== Early life ==
Đurišić grew up in the neighborhood of Stari Aerodrom, Titograd, and started playing basketball at age of 12, for the local basketball club Sinalco. He was persuaded to start playing basketball by his brother Boris. His childhood basketball idol was Vlade Divac and as a kid he loved watching Yugoslavian national basketball team, who were a powerhouse during the 1990s and early 2000s. After taking his first basketball steps in Sinalco, Đurišić joined the youth academy of KK Budućnost Podgorica, where he gained an audience with several scouts.

== High school ==
After completing first 2 years of high school in Podgorica Đurišić got an offer to finish his high school overseas, in South Kent School, and be part of their basketball team. Despite his lack of knowledge in English language at the time he managed to prove himself well both as a basketball player and as a student, which led to him deciding to pursue basketball scholarship at a college in the US. In two seasons for South Kent Đurišić averaged 20.1 points and 10.3 rebounds per game. During his high school years Đurišić also made appearances for Montenegrin national basketball team at FIBA Europe Under-18 Championship.

== College career ==
=== Freshman year ===
In 2011 Đurišić enrolled at the University of Georgia and was immediately recognized as skillful basketball player by the coaching staff. In his freshman year for the Bulldogs Đurišić started 12 games at the power forward position, including four of the last five games of the season.

=== Sophomore year ===
In 2011–12 season Đurišić had team's only double-double of the season in an SEC Tourney win over Miss. State. During his sophomore year Đurišić gained more playing minutes and had a career-high 21 points against Florida A&M.

=== Junior year ===
In 2013–14 Đurišić had a breakthrough year and was a key player from the bench for the Bulldogs. During junior year he was the team's best 3-point shooter, in terms of percentage. He set a new career-high, with 22 points in a win against South Carolina.

=== Senior year ===
During his senior year Đurišić became one of team's top players and a regular starter. In a game against Tennessee, he became the 44th player in UGA history to reach 1,000 career points. Đurišić scored 35 points in two games vs. #1-ranked Kentucky, including a team-high 18 at home against the Wildcats. He nearly had a triple-double in Georgia's win over Fla. Atlantic, with 8 pts., 10 rebs., and a career-best 8 assists (no UGA player has ever recorded a triple-double). Đurišić is one of just 19 players in UGA history to score 1,000 points and pull down 500 rebounds.

=== College statistics ===
Year	Team	GP	GS	MPG	FG%	3P%	FT%	RPG	APG	SPG	BPG	PPG
2011–12	Georgia	32	12	19.8	.405	.364	.659	4.2	0.8	0.4	0.2	7.0
2012–13	Georgia	32	10	24.4	.395	.317	.747	4.3	1.4	0.5	0.3	7.9
2013–14	Georgia	34	3	22.9	.482	.432	.684	4.0	0.8	0.5	0.4	8.4
2014–15	Georgia	33	32	30.0	.468	.340	.704	5.2	1.5	0.7	0.5	11.0
Career		131	57	24.3	.438	.363	.702	4.4	1.1	0.5	0.3	8.6

== Professional career ==
=== Stelmet Zielona Góra ===
In August 2015 Đurišić signed a one-year contract with Stelmet Zielona Góra. He averaged 5.0 points and 3.3 rebounds per game in EuroLeague. In July 2016 Đurišić re-signed with the team for one more year.

=== Filou Oostende ===
After a season with Telekom Baskets Bonn in Germany, he signed with Filou Oostende for the 2018–19 season.

=== Beşiktaş Sompo Japan ===
On July 12, 2019, he signed with Beşiktaş Sompo Japan of the BSL. He averaged 10 points and 4 rebounds per game.

=== Estudiantes ===
On July 28, 2020, he signed with Movistar Estudiantes of the Liga ACB.

=== Stal Ostrów Wielkopolski ===
On August 11, 2022, he signed with Stal Ostrów Wielkopolski of the Polish Basketball League (PLK).

=== BC Nizhny Novgorod ===
In 2024, he signed with BC Nizhny Novgorod of the VTB United League Russian Cup.

=== Kumamoto Volters ===
On June 20, 2025, he signed with Kumamoto Volters of the B.League.

=== Mitteldeutscher BC ===
On February 27, 2026, he signed with Mitteldeutscher BC of the German Basketball Bundesliga (BBL).

=== Tindastóll ===
In October 2026, he signed with Tindastóll of the Icelandic Úrvalsdeild karla.

== International career ==
In September 2016 Durišić helped Montenegro's basketball team reach EuroBasket 2017, through qualifiers, averaging 9.7 points and 2.7 rebounds per game. He scored a game-high 17 points in Montenegro's only loss of the qualifiers, against Georgia.

== Personal life ==
Đurišić majored in International relations and affairs at UGA. His parents, Snežana and Ranko Đurišić, both from Montenegro, took part in their first-ever UGA game on February 28, 2015, on the occasion of their first visit to the US, participating in the Senior Day recognition before the Kentucky game on March 3, 2015.

In June 2020, he married Miss Turkey 2013 contestant Ezgi Avcı.

They divorced after 15 months of marriage.
