= 2020–21 FIBA Europe Cup =

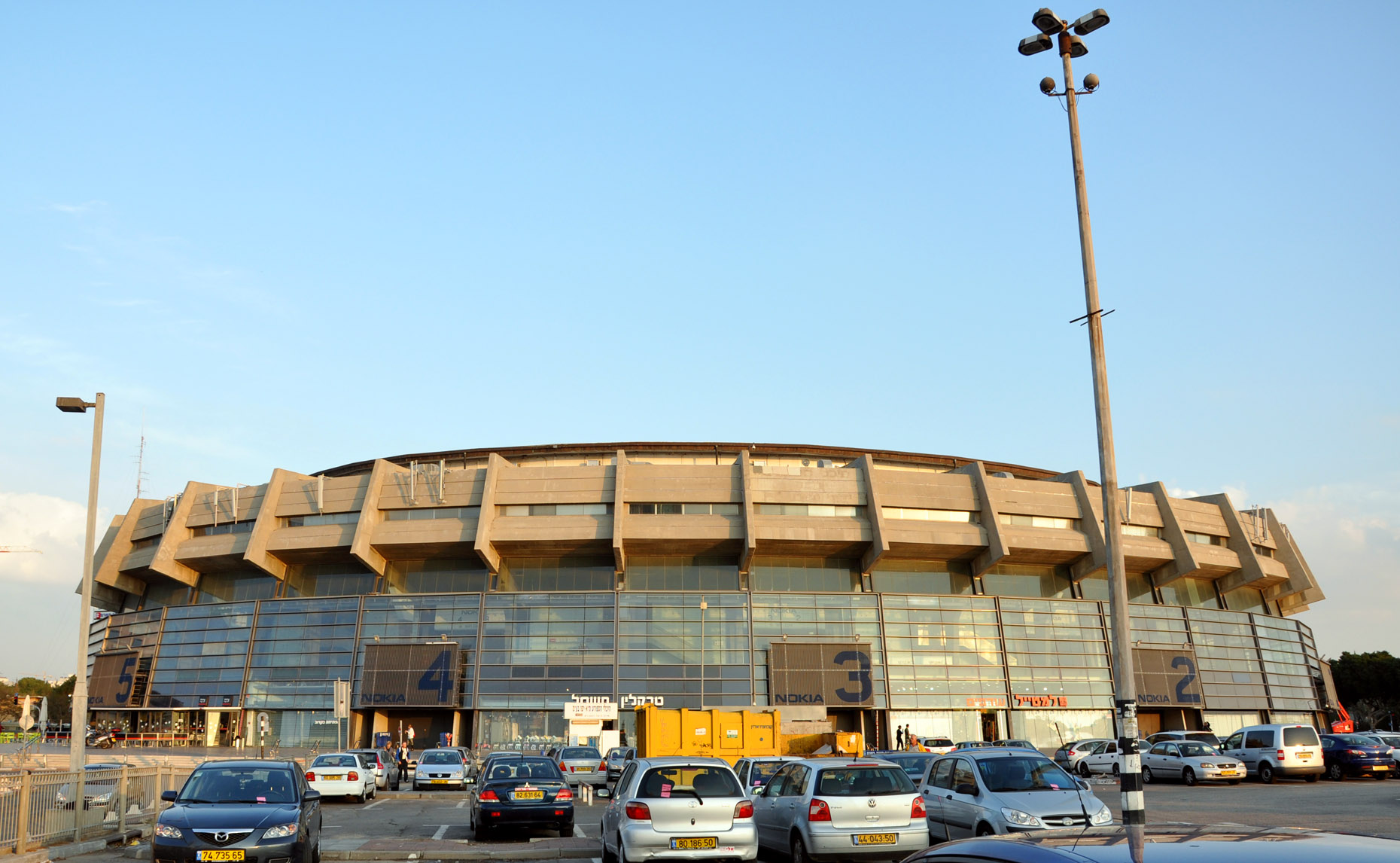
- The Menora Mivtachim Arena in Tel Aviv hosted the Final Four
- Season: 2020–21
- Dates: 26 January – 25 April 2021
- Games played: 46
- Teams: 22

Finals
- Champions: (Israel) Ironi Nes Ziona (1st title)
- Runners-up: (Poland) Arged BMSLAM Stal
- Semi-finalists: (Romania) CSM Oradea (Russia) Parma
- Final Four MVP: (United States) Wayne Selden Jr.

Statistical leaders
Points	(United States) Patrick Miller	15.6
Rebounds	(United States) Jerome Meyinsse	7.6
Assists	(United States) Patrick Miller	6.0
Index Rating	(United States) Patrick Miller	130

Seasons
- ← 2019–20 2021–22 →

The 2020–21 FIBA Europe Cup was the 6th season of the FIBA Europe Cup, a European professional basketball competition for clubs, that was launched by FIBA. The season started on 26 January 2021 as it was delayed due to the COVID-19 pandemic.

Ironi Nes Ziona won its first European title, after defeating Stal Ostrów Wielkopolski in the final in Tel Aviv.

== Effects of the COVID-19 pandemic ==
On 16 June 2020, FIBA Europe announced the season is presumed to start in September or October, with or without spectators. In case that the competition cannot start in September–October it will be automatically postponed to January 2021, with a reduced competition system.

On 2 September 2020, FIBA Europe announced the season will begin on 6 January 2021.

== Team allocation ==
Maximum 27 teams will play in the 2020–21 FIBA Europe Cup. The 16 teams directly qualified and at most 11 of the teams eliminated in the Basketball Champions League qualification rounds will join directly the regular season.

The teams are to be divided into seven groups. Groups of three and four teams will be formed.

Teams registered were officially published on 12 August 2020.

Draw will be on August 18.
Based on a decision of the Board of FIBA Europe, club from Russia (Parma) and clubs from Ukraine (Dnipro (if will not qualify for Champions League Regular season), Kyiv Basket, Prometey) will be drawn in separate groups in the Draw for the Regular Season.

=== Teams ===
- 1st, 2nd, etc.: Place in the domestic competition
- Abd: Season abandoned due to the COVID-19 pandemic

Regular season
(Belgium) Belfius Mons-Hainaut (CL QR2)	(Greece) Iraklis (CL QR1)	(Romania) CSM Oradea (Abd-2nd)	(Israel) Ironi Nes Ziona (7th)
(Lithuania) ~~Neptūnas~~ (CL QR2)	(Israel) ~~Hapoel Tel Aviv~~ (CL QR1)	(Romania) Sibiu (Abd-3rd)	(Italy) Unahotels Reggio Emilia (Abd-12th)
(Netherlands) Donar (CL QR2)	(Poland) Anwil Włocławek (CL QR1)	(Ukraine) Kyiv Basket (Abd-2nd)	(Montenegro) ~~Mornar~~
(Portugal) Sporting CP (CL QR2)	(Switzerland) Fribourg Olympic (CL QR1)	(Ukraine) Prometey (Abd-3rd)	(Netherlands) Heroes Den Bosch (Abd-3rd)
(Romania) ~~U-BT Cluj-Napoca~~ (CL QR1)	(Ukraine) Dnipro (CL QR1)	(Austria) Kapfenberg Bulls (Abd-2nd)	(Poland) Stal Ostrów Wielkopolski (Abd-9th)
(Bulgaria) Balkan (CL QR1)	(Hungary) Egis Körmend (Abd-2nd)	(Belarus) Borisfen (Abd-1st)	(Russia) Parma (Abd-5th)
(United Kingdom) London Lions (CL QR1)	(Hungary) Szolnoki Olajbányász (Abd-7th)	(Bulgaria) Rilski Sportist (Abd-3rd)	(Turkey) Beşiktaş Icrypex (Abd-8th)

1. NOTE Mornar: KK Mornar was drawn in group F, but withdrew because of the invitation to participate in 2020–21 EuroCup basketball in September 2020.

=== Applicants ===
The following 4 teams chose the option of ending their continental adventure if they were eliminated from the Champions League qualifying rounds and therefore refuse to participate in the FIBA Europe Cup:

- (Bosnia and Herzegovina) Igokea
- (Israel) Hapoel Tel Aviv
- (Lithuania) Neptūnas
- (Romania) U-BT Cluj-Napoca

== Round and draw dates ==
The schedule of the competition is as follows.

Phase	Round	Draw date	Match leg
Regular season	Matchday 1	18 August 2020	26 January 2021
Regular season	Matchday 2	18 August 2020	27–28 January 2021
Regular season	Matchday 3	18 August 2020	29 January 2021
Play-offs	Round of 16	3 February 2021	23–24 March 2021
Play-offs	Quarter-finals	3 February 2021	25–26 March 2021
Play-offs	Semi-finals	3 February 2021	23 April 2021
Play-offs	Finals	3 February 2021	25 April 2021

== System competition ==
Regular Season to be played in single venue hubs in single round-robin format from January 26–29, 2021. The top two clubs from each Regular Season group, plus the four best 3rd placed clubs, to advance to the Round of 16. The Round of 16 pairings to be determined by a draw, with all six group winners and the two best 2nd placed clubs seeded and the other qualified teams not seeded; clubs from the same regular season group cannot be drawn against each other. Round of 16 and Quarter-Finals to be played in single elimination games in four single venue hubs of four teams each, as per the Play-Off bracket, from March 23–25, 2021. Final Four to be played in a single venue hub from April 23–25, 2021.

== Regular season ==
=== Group A ===
Venue: Maaspoort in 's-Hertogenbosch, Netherlands

Pos	Team	Pld	W	L	PF	PA	PD	Pts	Qualification	IRA	REG	MON	KÖR
1	(Greece) Iraklis	3	3	0	251	225	+26	6	Advance to round of 16	—	—	—	94–76
2	(Italy) UnaHotels Reggio Emilia	3	2	1	232	226	+6	5	Advance to round of 16	74–78	—	—	—
3	(Belgium) Belfius Mons-Hainaut	3	1	2	227	215	+12	4	Advance to round of 16	75–79	69–70	—	—
4	(Hungary) Egis Körmend	3	0	3	221	265	−44	3		—	79–88	66–83	—

Source: FIBA Europe Cup
Legend: Blue = home team win; Red = away team win.

=== Group B ===
Venue: Arena Samokov in Samokov, Bulgaria

Pos	Team	Pld	W	L	PF	PA	PD	Pts	Qualification	PRO	KYI	RIL	KAP
1	(Ukraine) Prometey	3	3	0	225	200	+25	6	Advance to round of 16	—	—	89–76	—
2	(Ukraine) Kyiv-Basket	3	1	2	196	197	−1	4	Advance to round of 16	66–72	—	69–74	—
3	(Bulgaria) Rilski Sportist (H)	3	1	2	217	227	−10	4	Advance to round of 16	—	—	—	67–69
4	(Austria) Kapfenberg Bulls	3	1	2	178	192	−14	4		58–64	51–61	—	—

Source: FIBA Europe Cup
Legend: Blue = home team win; Red = away team win.
(H) Hosts

=== Group C ===
Venue: Hala Mistrzów in Włocławek, Poland

Pos	Team	Pld	W	L	PF	PA	PD	Pts	Qualification	STA	INZ	SZO	SPO
1	(Poland) Stal Ostrów Wielkopolski	3	3	0	268	249	+19	6	Advance to round of 16	—	—	—	85–83
2	(Israel) Ironi Nes Ziona	3	2	1	262	247	+15	5	Advance to round of 16	86–93	—	90–73	—
3	(Hungary) Szolnoki Olajbányász	3	1	2	231	247	−16	4		80–90	—	—	78–67
4	(Portugal) Sporting CP	3	0	3	231	249	−18	3		—	81–86	—	—

Source: FIBA Europe Cup
Legend: Blue = home team win; Red = away team win.

=== Group D ===
Venue: Akatlar Arena in Istanbul, Turkey

Pos	Team	Pld	W	L	PF	PA	PD	Pts	Qualification	SIB	BAL	ORA	BJK
1	(Romania) CSU Sibiu	3	2	1	247	235	+12	5	Advance to round of 16	—	88–75	—	—
2	(Bulgaria) Balkan	3	2	1	207	214	−7	5	Advance to round of 16	—	—	58–55	74–71
3	(Romania) CSM Oradea	3	1	2	216	219	−3	4	Advance to round of 16	70–78	—	—	91–83
4	(Turkey) Beşiktaş Icrypex (H)	3	1	2	244	246	−2	4		90–81	—	—	—

Source: FIBA Europe Cup
Legend: Blue = home team win; Red = away team win.
(H) Hosts

=== Group E ===
Venue: Hala Mistrzów in Włocławek, Poland

Pos	Team	Pld	W	L	PF	PA	PD	Pts	Qualification	OLY	DNI	ANW	LON
1	(Switzerland) Fribourg Olympic	2	1	1	143	131	+12	3	Advance to round of 16	—	57–62	—	—
2	(Ukraine) Dnipro	2	1	1	133	131	+2	3	Advance to round of 16	—	—	71–74	—
3	(Poland) Anwil Włocławek (H)	2	1	1	143	157	−14	3	Advance to round of 16	69–86	—	—	—
4	(United Kingdom) London Lions	0	0	0	0	0	0	0	Withdrawn	—	—	—	—

Source: FIBA Europe Cup
Legend: Blue = home team win; Red = away team win.
(H) Hosts

=== Group F ===
Venue: Maaspoort in 's-Hertogenbosch, Netherlands

Pos	Team	Pld	W	L	PF	PA	PD	Pts	Qualification	PAR	DBO	DON	BOR
1	(Russia) Parma	2	2	0	178	144	+34	4	Advance to round of 16	—	85–63	—	—
2	(Netherlands) Heroes Den Bosch (H)	2	1	1	162	183	−21	3	Advance to round of 16	—	—	99–98	—
3	(Netherlands) Donar	2	0	2	179	192	−13	2		81–93	—	—	—
4	(Belarus) Borisfen	0	0	0	0	0	0	0	Withdrawn	—	—	—	—

Source: FIBA Europe Cup
Legend: Blue = home team win; Red = away team win.
(H) Hosts

=== Ranking of third-placed teams ===
Pos	Grp	Team	Pld	W	L	PF	PA	PD	Pts	Qualification
1	B	(Bulgaria) Rilski Sportist	2	1	1	150	158	−8	3	Advance to round of 16
2	E	(Poland) Anwil Włocławek	2	1	1	143	157	−14	3	Advance to round of 16
3	A	(Belgium) Belfius Mons-Hainaut	2	0	2	144	149	−5	2	Advance to round of 16
4	D	(Romania) CSM Oradea	2	0	2	125	136	−11	2	Advance to round of 16
5	F	(Netherlands) Donar	2	0	2	179	192	−13	2	
6	C	(Hungary) Szolnoki Olajbányász	2	0	2	153	180	−27	2	

Source: FIBA Europe Cup
Rules for classification: 1) Points; 2) Points difference; 3) Points scored.

== Play-offs ==
All games are to be played in a single-elimination format.

=== Draw ===
The playoffs draw will take place in the FIBA Europe Regional Office headquarters in Munich, Germany on Wednesday, February 3 at 14:00 CET and will be made with the restriction that teams from the same regular season group cannot be drawn against each other.

Seeded teams (Poland) Arged BMSLAM Stal (Romania) CSU Sibiu (Ukraine) Dnipro (Greece) Iraklis (Israel) Ironi Nes Ziona (Switzerland) Fribourg Olympic (Russia) Parma (Ukraine) Prometey	Non-seeded teams (Poland) Anwil Włocławek (Bulgaria) Balkan (Belgium) Belfius Mons-Hainaut (Romania) CSM Oradea (Netherlands) Heroes Den Bosch (Ukraine) Kyiv-Basket (Bulgaria) Rilski Sportist (Italy) UNAHOTELS Reggio Emilia

=== Bracket ===
The hub locations of the round of 16 and quarterfinals were announced on 25 February.

Round of 16
23 March – Botevgrad
(Switzerland) Fribourg Olympic	74
(Bulgaria) Balkan	90
23 March – Botevgrad
(Russia) Parma	90
(Bulgaria) Rilski Sportist	61
24 March – 's-Hertogenbosch
(Greece) Iraklis	86
(Poland) Anwil Włocławek	81
24 March – 's-Hertogenbosch
(Israel) Ironi Nes Ziona	90
(Ukraine) Kyiv-Basket	76
23 March – Oradea
(Romania) CSU Sibiu	61
(Italy) UH Reggio Emilia	65
23 March – Oradea
(Ukraine) Dnipro	72
(Romania) CSM Oradea	78
23 March – 's-Hertogenbosch
(Ukraine) Prometey	81
(Belgium) Belfius Mons-Hainaut	88
23 March – 's-Hertogenbosch
(Poland) Arged BMSLAM Stal	92
(Netherlands) Heroes Den Bosch	83

Quarter-finals
25 March – Botevgrad
(Bulgaria) Balkan	62
(Russia) Parma	84
26 March – 's-Hertogenbosch
(Greece) Iraklis	80
(Israel) Ironi Nes Ziona	105
25 March – Oradea
(Italy) UH Reggio Emilia	64
(Romania) CSM Oradea	71
25 March – 's-Hertogenbosch
(Belgium) Belfius Mons-Hainaut	66
(Poland) Arged BMSLAM Stal	73

Semi-finals
23 April – Tel Aviv
(Russia) Parma	80
(Israel) Ironi Nes Ziona	81
23 April – Tel Aviv
(Romania) CSM Oradea	66
(Poland) Arged BMSLAM Stal	77

Final
25 April – Tel Aviv
(Israel) Ironi Nes Ziona	82
(Poland) Arged BMSLAM Stal	74
Third place
25 April – Tel Aviv
(Romania) CSM Oradea	85
(Russia) Parma	76

2020–21 FIBA Europe Cup champions

Ironi Nes Ziona
1st title

== Individual awards ==
=== FIBA Europe Cup Final MVP ===
Player	Team	Ref.
(United States) Wayne Selden	(Israel) Ironi Nes Ziona	

=== Top Performer ===
Round	Player	Team	EFF	Ref.
1	(Netherlands) Thomas van der Mars	(Netherlands) Heroes Den Bosch	38	
2	(Turkey) Alperen Şengün	(Turkey) Beşiktaş Icrypex	27	
2	(United States) Rashad Vaughn	(Ukraine) Prometey	27	
3	(Turkey) Alperen Şengün (2)	(Turkey) Beşiktaş Icrypex	31	
Round of 16	(Colombia) Braian Angola	(Israel) Ironi Nes Ziona	33	
Quarter-finals	(United States) Patrick Miller	(Israel) Ironi Nes Ziona	29	
Semi-finals	(United States) Trey Kell	(Poland) Arged BMSLAM Stal	24	
Final Four	(United States) Wayne Selden Jr.	(Israel) Ironi Nes Ziona	MVP	

== See also ==
- 2020–21 Basketball Champions League
- 2020–21 EuroLeague
- 2020–21 EuroCup Basketball
