= James Florence =

American basketball player (born 1988)

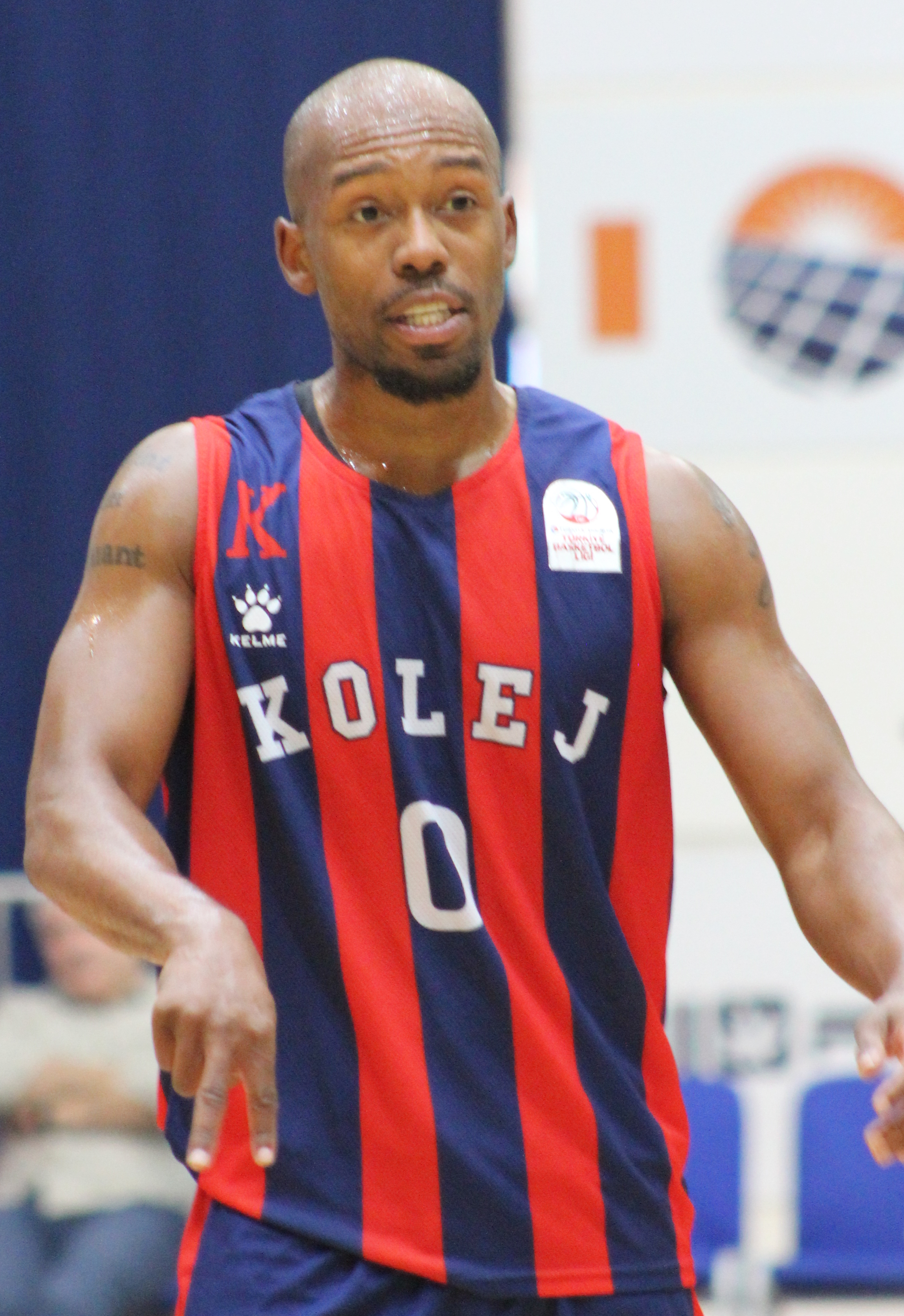
- Florence with TED Ankara Kolejliler in 2024.

No. 0 – Sigortam.net İTÜ BB
- Position: Point guard
- League: Basketball Super League

Personal information
- Born: May 31, 1988 (age 38) Marietta, Georgia, U.S.
- Listed height: 6 ft 1 in (1.85 m)
- Listed weight: 186 lb (84 kg)

Career information
- High school: Joseph Wheeler (Marietta, Georgia)
- College: Mercer (2006–2010)
- NBA draft: 2010: undrafted
- Playing career: 2010–present

Career history
- 2010–2011: Igokea
- 2011–2013: Kryvbas
- 2013: Szolnoki Olaj
- 2013–2014: New Yorker Phantoms Braunschweig
- 2014–2015: Zadar
- 2015: TED Ankara Kolejliler
- 2015: Paris-Levallois
- 2015–2016: Cibona
- 2016–2018: Stelmet Zielona Góra
- 2018–2019: Arka Gdynia
- 2019: Champville
- 2019–2020: Astana
- 2020–2022: Stal Ostrów Wielkopolski
- 2022–2023: Arka Gdynia
- 2024–present: Sigortam.net İTÜ BB

Career highlights
- Polish Cup winner (2022); 2× Polish League champion (2017, 2021); Polish League MVP (2019); All-PLK Team (2019); Polish League Finals MVP (2017)

James Brian Florence (born May 31, 1988) is an American professional basketball player for Sigortam.net İTÜ BB of the Basketball Super League. Standing at 1.86 m, he plays the point guard position.

== College career ==
Florence played college basketball for the Mercer Bears from 2006–2010.

== Professional career ==
Florence has also played professionally in the basketball leagues of Bosnia and Herzegovina, Ukraine, Hungary and Germany as well as in the EuroChallenge and Adriatic League competitions with Szolnoki Olaj.

In August 2014 he signed a one-year contract with the Croatian side KK Zadar. On March 15, 2015, he left Zadar. Three days later he signed with TED Ankara Kolejliler of Turkey for the rest of the 2014–15 Turkish Basketball League season.

On July 6, 2015, Florence signed a one-year contract with Paris-Levallois of the French LNB Pro A. On October 15, 2015, he parted ways with Paris after appearing in four league games. The next day, he signed with the Croatian club Cibona Zagreb for the rest of the season.

On July 21, 2016, Florence signed a one-year deal with Polish club Stelmet Zielona Góra. With Zielona Góra he won the 2016–17 PLK championship and was named the PLK Finals MVP, after averaging 16.4 points and 3.2 assists per game over the series. On June 30, 2017, he re-signed with Zielona Góra for one more season.

On July 28, 2018, Florence signed with Asseco Gdynia in Poland.

On August 18, 2019, Florence signed with Champville SC of the Lebanese League.

On December 11, 2019, Florence signed with BC Astana of the VTB United League.

On June 24, 2020, Florence signed with Stal Ostrów Wielkopolski of the Polish Basketball League (PLK).

On July 30, 2022, he has signed with Arka Gdynia of the Polish Basketball League for a second stint.
