= Aleksander Dziewa =

Polish basketball player (born 1997)

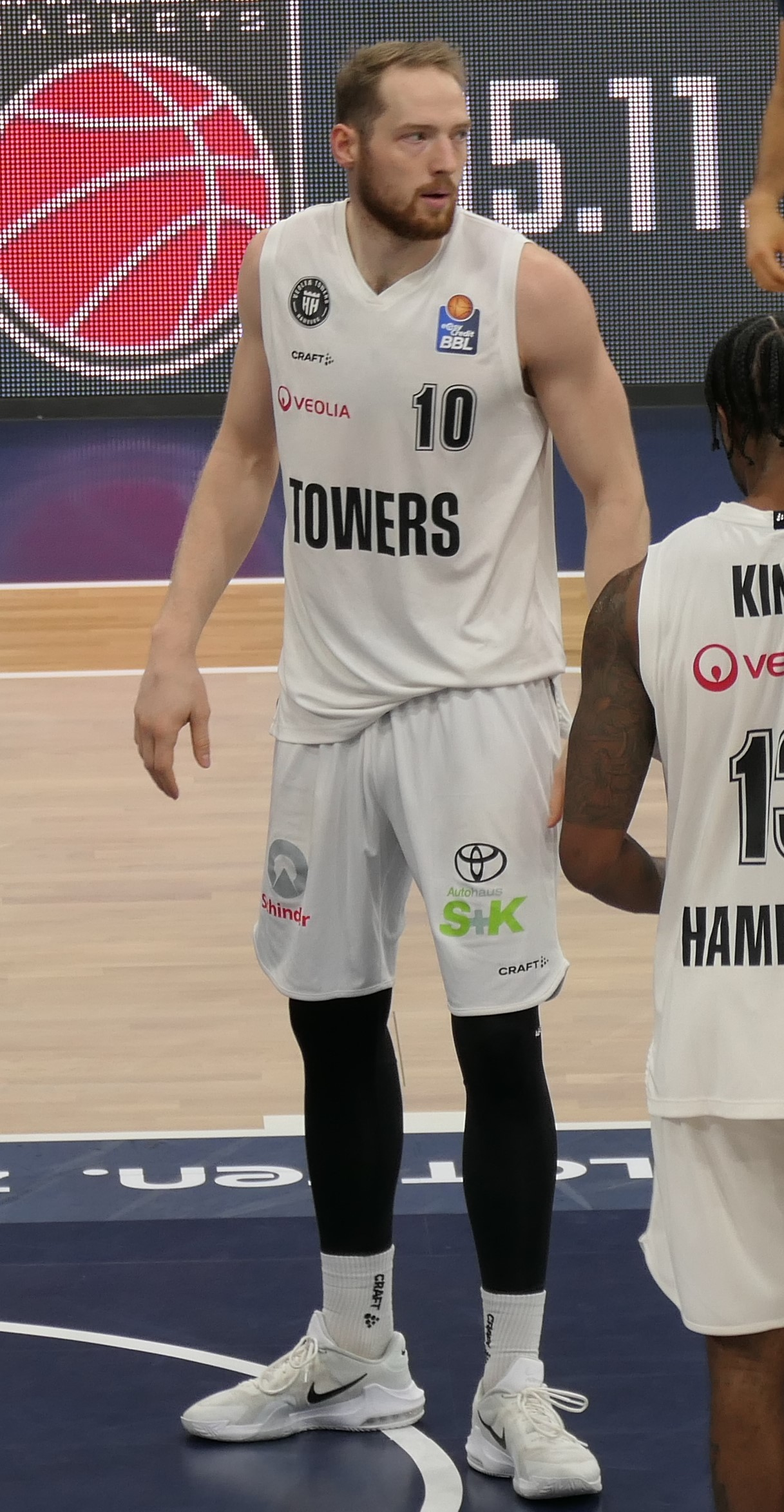
- Dziewa playing for Hamburg Towers in 2023

No. 11 – Benfica
- Position: Power forward / center
- League: Liga Portuguesa de Basquetebol

Personal information
- Born: 6 November 1997 (age 29) Konin, Poland
- Listed height: 2.05 m (6 ft 9 in)
- Listed weight: 113 kg (249 lb)

Career information
- Playing career: 2016–present

Career history
- 2016–2023: Śląsk Wrocław
- 2023–2024: Hamburg Towers
- 2024–2025: Wilki Morskie Szczecin
- 2025–present: Benfica

Career highlights
- PLK champion (2022); 2× All-PLK Team (2022, 2023); PLK Best Polish Player (2022); 2020–21 PLK season - Bronze medal

Aleksander Dziewa (born 6 November 1997) is a Polish professional basketball player for Benfica of the Liga Portuguesa de Basquetebol. He won the PLK championship in 2022.

== Early life ==
Aleksander Dziewa played chess regularly until he enrolled in middle school. He started basketball at age 16. He has two The Pug dogs.

== Professional career ==
Dziewa started his club career with Śląsk Wrocław in the I Liga.

The 2018–19 I Liga season was a turning point for him. In the first match against KKS Pro-Basket Kutno, he scored 28 points. Then, excluding one game, he regularly scored around 20 points. His "favorite" rival was SKK Siedlce, against whom he averaged 38 points in both matches. This achievement was especially noteworthy as Dziewa's coach Radosław Hyży took Dziewa out of the game early in order to give other players time to develop.

Throughout the season, Dziewa averaged 22.2 points and 9.7 rebounds per meeting. In the last match against SKK Siedlce, his efficiency index was as high as 46.

He was one of the cornerstones of the team that promoted to the Polish Basketball League in 2019. Aleksander Dziewa got MVP of Polish 1st League.

With Śląsk Wrocław, as one of the key players Dziewa helped defeat Legia Warszawa 86:85 in extra time for the bronze medal match. The result superseded expectations. For this final game of the season, Dziewa praised the performance of both Elijah Stewart and Strahinja Jovanovic. Aleksnader Dziewa won award for best Polish Player of the league in 2022.

On July 12, 2023, he signed with Hamburg Towers of the Basketball Bundesliga. He moved to Bundesliga after years of trying. Main key was 2022/2023 season in which he developed his 3pt shot under eye of polish development coach and assistant coach Maksym Papacz. Dziewa increased his 3pt percentage by 8,3%. Averaged 32.5% (2020/2022) and 40.8% (2022/2023)

On August 8, 2024, he signed with Wilki Morskie Szczecin of the Polish Basketball League (PLK).

On August 13, 2025, he signed with Benfica of the Liga Portuguesa de Basquetebol.

== National team ==
In the summer of 2018, Aleksander Dziewa was called up to the Polish national team B, with which he played several matches in China.

Because of Dziewa's strong performances in the national league, head coach Mike Taylor appointed Dziewa for the Polish main national team for the victorious 2019 FIBA Basketball World Cup qualification games against Croatia and the Netherlands.
