= Arena Ostrów =

Indoor sports arena in Poland

- Arena Ostrów logo
- Interactive map of Arena Ostrów
- Address: Andrzeja Kowalczyka 1; 63-400 Ostrów Wielkopolski
- Location: Ostrów Wielkopolski, Poland
- Coordinates: 51.65094359893537°N 17.808469792909353°E
- Owner: Ostrowskie Inwestycje Sportowe
- Capacity: 2,600 (handball, futsal); 3,086 (basketball); 5,200 (concerts)

Construction
- Groundbreaking: 6 May 2019
- Opened: 11 November 2020
- Cost: 31 million Polish złoty
- Builder: Bud-Rem

Tenant
- Stal Ostrów Wielkopolski (2020–present)

Website
- arenaostrow.pl

The Arena Ostrów is an indoor sports arena located in Ostrów Wielkopolski, Poland. The arena is used for basketball and handball and has a capacity for 3,000 people. The arena opened on 11 November 2020, after construction started a year earlier. The arena was built by local company Bud-Rem and costed approximately 31 million Polish złoty.
