= 2021–22 PLK season =

Energa Basket Liga
- Season: 2021–22
- Dates: 2 September 2021 – 27 May 2022
- Teams: 16
- TV partner: Polsat Sport

Regular season
- Top seed: Grupa Sierleccy Czarni Słupsk
- Season MVP: (United States) Travis Trice
- Relegated: HydroTruck Radom

Finals
- Champions: WKS Śląsk Wrocław (18th title)
- Runners-up: Legia Warszawa
- Third place: Anwil Włocławek
- Fourth place: Grupa Sierleccy Czarni Słupsk
- Finals MVP: (United States) Travis Trice

Statistical leaders
Points	(United States) Jonah Mathews	19.0
Rebounds	(Serbia) Dragan Apić	8.5
Assists	(United States) Travis Trice	7.4
Index Rating	(Serbia) Dragan Apić	20.5
- All statistics correct as of complete.

The 2021–22 Polish Basketball League (PLK) season, the Energa Basket Liga for sponsorship reasons, was the 88th season of the Polish Basketball League, the highest professional basketball league in Poland. Arged BM Slam Stal Ostrów Wielkopolski were the defending champions.

== Teams ==
16 teams will participate this season.

=== Locations and venues ===
Location of teams in the 2021–22 PLK season

Team	Location	Arena	Capacity
Anwil Włocławek	Włocławek	Hala Mistrzów	4,200
Asseco Arka Gdynia	Gdynia	Gdynia Sports Arena	5,500
BM Slam Stal Ostrów Wielkopolski	Ostrów Wielkopolski	Hala Sportowa Stal	1,200
Enea Astoria	Bydgoszcz	Artego Arena	1,470
Grupa Sierleccy Czarni Słupsk	Slupsk	Hala Gryfia	2,500
GTK Gliwice	Gliwice	Gliwice Arena	13,752
HydroTruck Radom	Radom	ZSE Radom	1,200
Legia Warsaw	Warsaw	OSiR Bemowo	1,000
MKS Dąbrowa Górnicza	Dąbrowa Górnicza	Centrum Hall	2,944
Polski Cukier Pszczółka Start Lublin	Lublin	Hala Globus	5,000
Śląsk Wrocław	Wrocław	Hala Orbita	3,000
Spójnia Stargard	Stargard	Hala Miejska	2,500
Trefl Sopot	Sopot	Ergo Arena	15,000
Twarde Pierniki Toruń	Toruń	Arena Toruń	6,248
Wilki Morskie Szczecin	Szczecin	Azoty Arena	7,403
Zastal Zielona Góra	Zielona Góra	CRS Hall	6,080

== Regular season ==
=== League table ===
Pos	Team	Pld	W	L	PF	PA	PD	Pts	Qualification or relegation
1	Grupa Sierleccy Czarni Słupsk	30	23	7	2513	2362	+151	53	Advance to playoffs
2	Anwil Włocławek	30	22	8	2554	2359	+195	52	Advance to playoffs
3	BM Slam Stal Ostrów Wielkopolski	30	22	8	2792	2433	+359	52	Advance to playoffs
4	Zastal Zielona Góra	30	21	9	2642	2387	+255	51	Advance to playoffs
5	WKS Śląsk Wrocław (C)	30	19	11	2553	2383	+170	49	Advance to playoffs
6	Legia Warszawa	30	17	13	2505	2446	+59	47	Advance to playoffs
7	Twarde Pierniki Toruń	30	17	13	2508	2500	+8	47	Advance to playoffs
8	King Szczecin	30	15	15	2504	2502	+2	45	Advance to playoffs
9	Enea Astoria Bydgoszcz	30	15	15	2497	2474	+23	45	
10	Trefl Sopot	30	15	15	2443	2461	−18	45	
11	Spójnia Stargard	30	11	19	2379	2560	−181	41	
12	Polski Cukier Pszczółka Start Lublin	30	11	19	2293	2455	−162	41	
13	Asseco Arka Gdynia	30	11	19	2300	2499	−199	41	
14	MKS Dąbrowa Górnicza	30	10	20	2482	2636	−154	40	
15	GTK Gliwice	30	6	24	2271	2587	−316	36	
16	HydroTruck Radom	30	5	25	2348	2540	−192	35	Relegation to I Liga

Source: PLK
(C) Champions

=== Results ===
Home \ Away	ANW	GDY	STA	CZA	BYD	GTK	RAD	SZC	LEG	MKS	TOR	SPO	LUB	SOP	WRO	ZIE
Anwil Włocławek	—	72–82	107–88	75–80	77–58	95–71	93–79	80–89	94–81	90–86	84–78	108–97	90–81	81–61	97–89	89–82
Arka Gdynia	78–83	—	73–102	59–87	74–97	84–68	99–78	89–65	70–88	81–80	90–101	76–74	78–66	90–98	65–80	73–83
BM Slam Stal Ostrów Wielkopolski	66–79	98–75	—	82–83	83–73	78–77	108–84	84–74	96–92	91–80	96–74	91–82	99–62	86–78	83–74	105–98
Grupa Sierleccy Czarni Słupsk	83–77	100–75	88–80	—	99–78	84–74	86–82	77–92	96–90	94–75	77–94	68–66	66–62	73–66	89–79	80–63
Enea Astoria Bydgoszcz	58–62	98–85	83–86	86–82	—	94–71	76–73	71–102	76–83	92–62	70–81	97–93	82–89	105–90	77–88	106–88
GTK Gliwice	62–88	72–73	70–122	76–83	77–82	—	86–82	73–70	78–75	67–95	70–83	110–70	73–76	72–82	61–89	82–89
HydroTruck Radom	84–92	85–91	83–78	80–83	68–85	82–94	—	74–82	75–88	75–78	72–59	68–87	65–70	69–76	64–67	89–92
King Szczecin	82–76	78–85	79–118	74–77	81–71	93–82	103–112	—	99–83	83–102	92–87	93–81	81–85	98–73	99–83	86–96
Legia Warsaw	74–73	79–59	84–114	68–66	68–87	86–73	73–60	101–71	—	81–78	105–68	84–86	69–60	104–109	73–87	79–85
MKS Dąbrowa Górnicza	92–86	96–85	96–112	82–97	80–94	101–92	76–72	77–90	86–99	—	98–92	87–101	94–101	71–79	87–88	83–78
Twarde Pierniki Toruń	84–92	83–75	105–98	83–76	102–86	99–85	82–85	76–69	77–87	85–92	—	85–77	81–55	73–92	86–95	95–77
Spójnia Stargard	95–87	79–64	61–105	81–104	89–86	64–54	80–73	75–81	63–77	75–71	80–82	—	80–81	82–94	86–73	53–96
Polski Cukier Pszczółka Start Lublin	64–75	90–76	77–88	81–82	73–80	69–77	79–78	73–92	97–107	77–68	83–85	82–97	—	70–73	85–67	73–99
Trefl Sopot	82–89	58–72	77–101	103–78	81–86	91–68	80–85	69–61	85–70	86–70	89–91	72–71	84–86	—	89–102	93–89
WKS Śląsk Wrocław	74–80	86–63	79–69	96–84	90–81	106–74	106–94	85–74	78–91	102–60	68–70	105–90	84–76	77–67	—	85–88
Zastal Zielona Góra	79–83	75–61	86–85	83–91	97–82	102–82	91–78	87–71	100–66	91–79	85–67	106–64	85–70	91–66	81–71	—

Source: PLK
Legend: Blue = home team win; Red = away team win.

== Playoffs ==
Quarterfinals and semifinals are played in a best-of-five format (2–2–1) while the finals in a best-of-seven one (2–2–1–1–1).

=== Bracket ===
Quarterfinals
1	Grupa Sierleccy Czarni Słupsk	3
8	King Szczecin	1
4	Zastal Zielona Góra	2
5	WKS Śląsk Wrocław	3
2	Anwil Włocławek	3
7	Twarde Pierniki Toruń	1
3	Arged BMStal Ostrów Wielkopolski	0
6	Legia Warszawa	3

Semifinals
1	Grupa Sierleccy Czarni Słupsk	2
5	WKS Śląsk Wrocław	3
2	Anwil Włocławek	0
6	Legia Warszawa	3

Finals
5	WKS Śląsk Wrocław	4
6	Legia Warszawa	1
Third place
1	Grupa Sierleccy Czarni Słupsk	153
2	Anwil Włocławek	169

=== Quarterfinals ===
Team 1	Series	Team 2	Game 1	Game 2	Game 3	Game 4	Game 5
Grupa Sierleccy Czarni Słupsk	3–1	King Szczecin	93–69	89–80	78–83	97–82	–
Anwil Włocławek	3–1	Twarde Pierniki Toruń	92–62	87–71	85–94	85–78	–
BM Slam Stal Ostrów Wielkopolski	0–3	Legia Warszawa	78–82	64–67	81–85	–	–
Zastal Zielona Góra	2–3	WKS Śląsk Wrocław	103–90	85–83	68–95	80–87	80–86

=== Semifinals ===
Team 1	Series	Team 2	Game 1	Game 2	Game 3	Game 4	Game 5
Grupa Sierleccy Czarni Słupsk	2–3	WKS Śląsk Wrocław	57–77	66–91	123–60	89–69	71–81
Anwil Włocławek	0–3	Legia Warszawa	79–83	71–77	77–87	–	–

=== Third place series ===
Team 1	Agg.	Team 2	1st leg	2nd leg
Grupa Sierleccy Czarni Słupsk	153–169	Anwil Włocławek	77–78	76–91

=== Finals ===
Team 1	Series	Team 2	Game 1	Game 2	Game 3	Game 4	Game 5	Game 6	Game 7
WKS Śląsk Wrocław	4–1	Legia Warszawa	76–72	85–88	81–74	66–63	90–77	–	–

== Awards ==
All official awards of the 2021–22 PLK season.

=== Season awards ===
Award	Player	Team	Ref.
PLK Most Valuable Player	(United States) Travis Trice	WKS Śląsk Wrocław	
PLK Finals MVP	(United States) Travis Trice	WKS Śląsk Wrocław	
PLK Best Defender	(Croatia) Ivan Ramljak	WKS Śląsk Wrocław	
PLK Best Polish Player	(Poland) Aleksander Dziewa	WKS Śląsk Wrocław	
PLK Best Coach	(Poland) Mantas Česnauskis	Grupa Sierleccy Czarni Słupsk	
All-PLK Team	(United States) Travis Trice	WKS Śląsk Wrocław	
All-PLK Team	(United States) Jonah Mathews	Anwil Włocławek	
All-PLK Team	(Serbia) Dragan Apić	Zastal Zielona Góra	
All-PLK Team	(Poland) Aleksander Dziewa	WKS Śląsk Wrocław	
All-PLK Team	(United States) Billy Garrett Jr.	Grupa Sierleccy Czarni Słupsk	

=== MVP of the Round ===
Gameday	Player	Team	EFF	Ref.
1	(Serbia) Dragan Apić	Zastal Zielona Góra	32	
2	(United States) A. J. English	HydroTruck Radom	26	
3	(Poland) Karol Gruszecki	Trefl Sopot	31	
4	(United States) Maurice Watson	Twarde Pierniki Toruń	40	
5	(United States) Doron Lamb	Polski Cukier Pszczółka Start Lublin	26	
6	(Poland) Jakub Schenk	King Szczecin	24	
7	(Poland) Mateusz Zębski	Astoria Bydgoszcz	31	
8	(Poland) Aaron Cel	Twarde Pierniki Toruń	31	
9	(United States) Erick Neal	Spójnia Stargard	43	
10	(United States) Maurice Watson (2)	Twarde Pierniki Toruń	36	
11	(United States) Raymond Cowels	Legia Warsaw	27	
12	(Poland) Szymon Szewczyk	Anwil Włocławek	24	
13	(Poland) Aleksander Dziewa	WKS Śląsk Wrocław	35	
14	(United States) Jacobi Boykins	Arka Gdynia	32	
15	(Poland) Jakub Nizioł	Astoria Bydgoszcz	24	
16	(Poland) Jarosław Zyskowski	Zastal Zielona Góra	23	
17	(Poland) Andrzej Pluta Jr.	Astoria Bydgoszcz	26	
18	(United States) Jonah Mathews	Anwil Włocławek	40	
19 & 20	(Palestine) Kyndall Dykes	Anwil Włocławek	37	
21	(Poland) Aleksander Dziewa (2)	WKS Śląsk Wrocław	11 & 13	
22	(Poland) Mateusz Zębski (2)	Astoria Bydgoszcz	38	
23	(Poland) Filip Matczak	King Szczecin	29	
24	(United States) Travis Trice	WKS Śląsk Wrocław	33 & 23	
25	(United States) Jonah Mathews (2)	Anwil Włocławek	17 & 30	
26	(United States) Malachi Richardson	King Szczecin	34	
27	(United States) James Palmer	Arged BM Slam Stal Ostrów Wielkopolski	38	
28	(Croatia) Roko Rogić	Twarde Pierniki Toruń	32	
29	(Poland) Michał Kolenda	Trefl Sopot	28	

=== MVP of the Month ===
Month	Player	Team	EFF	Ref.
2021
September	(United States) Billy Garrett Jr.	Grupa Sierleccy Czarni Słupsk	20.0	
October	(Poland) Jakub Schenk	King Szczecin	19.0	
November	(United States) Trey Drechsel	BM Slam Stal Ostrów Wielkopolski	23.5	
December	(United States) Devyn Marble	MKS Dąbrowa Górnicza	23.0	
2022
January	(United States) Jonah Mathews	Anwil Włocławek	24.0	
February	(United States) Travis Trice	Śląsk Wrocław	23.7	
March	(United States) Travis Trice	Śląsk Wrocław	23.7	

== Statistical leaders ==
Leaders at the end of the regular season.

Category	Player	Team	Value
Points per game	Robert Johnson	Legia Warsaw	18.8
Rebounds per game	Dragan Apić	Zastal Zielona Góra	8.5
Assists per game	Travis Trice	Śląsk Wrocław	7.3
Steals per game	Mateusz Zębski	Astoria Bydgoszcz	1.9
Blocks per game	John Sharma	Trefl Sopot	1.3
Evaluation per game	Roko Rogić	Twarde Pierniki Toruń	19.8

== Polish clubs in European competitions ==
Team	Competition	Progress
Śląsk Wroclaw	EuroCup	Eightfinals
Stal Ostrów Wielkopolski	Champions League	Regular Season
Legia Warsaw	FIBA Europe Cup	Quarterfinals
Trefl Sopot	FIBA Europe Cup	Second Round

== Polish clubs in Regional competitions ==
Team	Competition	Progress
Zastal Zielona Góra	VTB United League	Withdrawn
MKS Dąbrowa Górnicza	Alpe Adria Cup	Quarterfinals
Anwil Włocławek	European North Basketball League	Champions
