= Aigars Šķēle =

Latvian basketball player

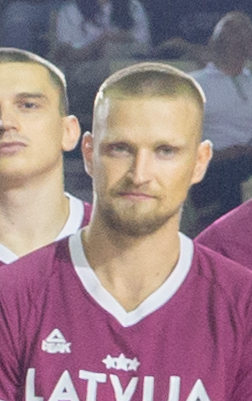
- Šķēle with Latvia men's national basketball team in 2023

No. 21 – VEF Rīga
- Position: Shooting guard / point guard
- League: LBL; LEBL

Personal information
- Born: December 4, 1992 (age 33) Riga, Latvia
- Listed height: 1.92 m (6 ft 4 in)
- Listed weight: 84 kg (185 lb)

Career information
- NBA draft: 2014: undrafted
- Playing career: 2009–present

Career history
- 2012–2013: Barons
- 2013–2014: Jūrmala/Fēnikss
- 2014–2015: VEF Rīga
- 2015–2016: Valmiera/ORDO
- 2016–2018: Ventspils
- 2018–2019: Antibes Sharks
- 2019–2020: Kalev/Cramo
- 2020–2021: VEF Rīga
- 2021–2022: s.Oliver Würzburg
- 2022–2024: Stal Ostrów Wielkopolski
- 2024–2025: Rostock Seawolves
- 2025: Stal Ostrów Wielkopolski
- 2025–2026: Czarni Słupsk
- 2026–present: VEF Rīga

Career highlights
- All-PLK Team (2024); ENBL winner (2023); Polish Supercup winner (2022); Estonia/Latvia League All Star (2018); 3× LBL champion (2016, 2018, 2021)

Aigars Šķēle (born December 4, 1992) is a Latvian professional basketball player for Czarni Słupsk of the Polish Basketball League (PLK). 6 stycznia 2025 Aigars ponownie został zawodnikiem Tasomix Rosiek Stal Ostrów Wielkopolski.

== Playing career ==
Šķēle spent couple of seasons in Spain, playing for Baloncesto Fuenlabrada youth teams, before returning to his home country in 2012. He played one season for Barons, then joined Jūrmala for the 2013-14 season. Šķēle helped Jūrmala to reach Latvian League semifinals for the first time in club history.

On August 11, 2014, he moved to VEF Rīga.

On January 7, 2015, he was loaned to BK Valmiera

On June 11, 2021, he has signed with s.Oliver Würzburg of the German Basketball Bundesliga.

On August 11, 2022, he has signed with Stal Ostrów Wielkopolski of the Polish Basketball League (PLK). Aigars became the leader of his new team and one of the best players in PLK, re-signing with the team for another season.

On July 9, 2024, he has signed with Rostock Seawolves of the Basketball Bundesliga.

On January 6, 2025, he has signed with Stal Ostrów Wielkopolski of the Polish Basketball League (PLK) for a second stint.

On June 19, 2025, he signed with Czarni Słupsk of the Polish Basketball League (PLK).

== National team career ==
Šķēle made his debut with the senior Latvian national team in 2016. He represented Latvia at the EuroBasket 2017, where the team finished 5th overall.

== Personal life ==
His older brother, Armands, is also a professional basketball player.
