= Patrick Miller (basketball) =

American basketball player (born 1992)

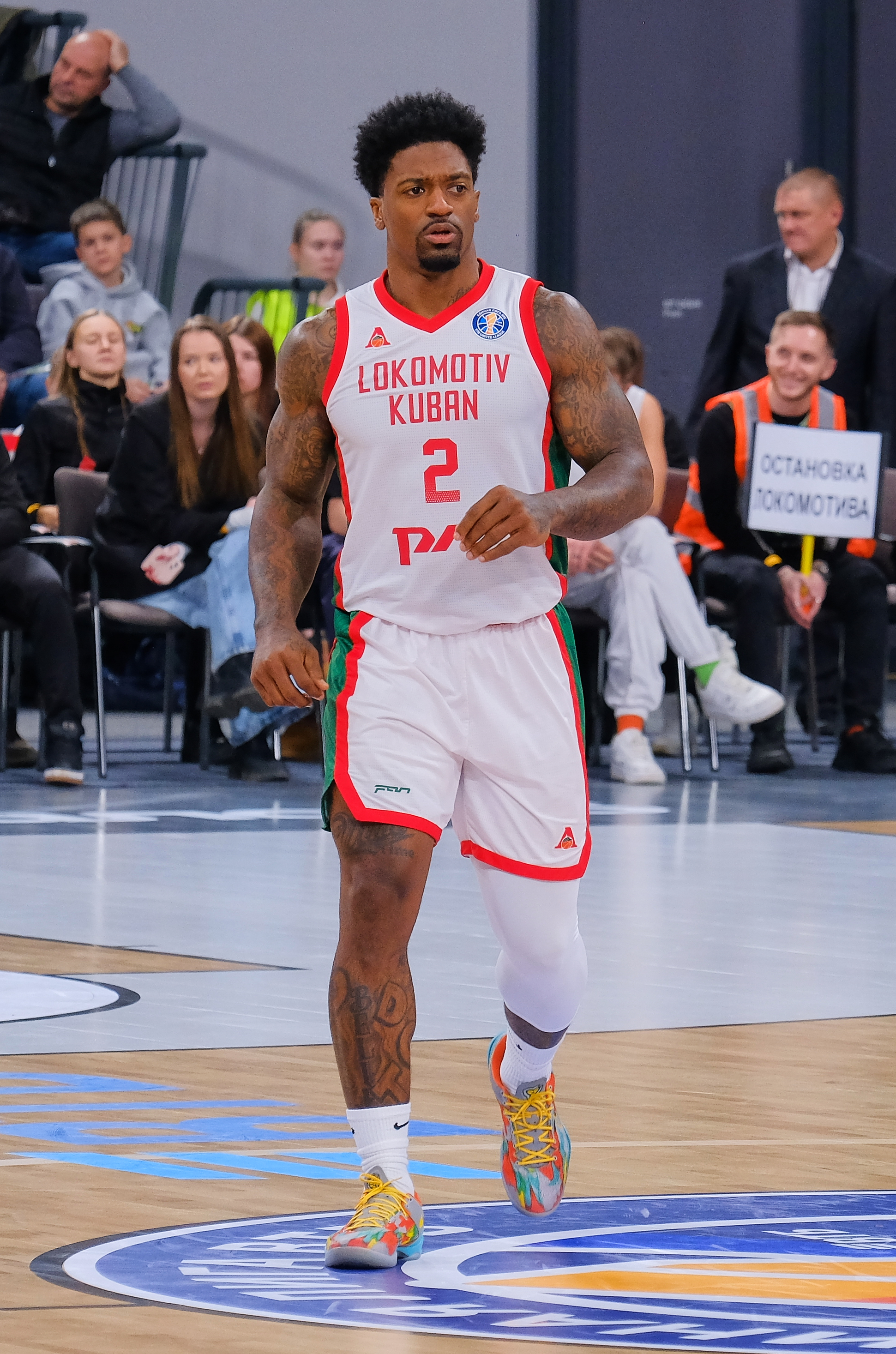
- Miller with Lokomotiv Kuban in 2024

No. 2 – Lokomotiv Kuban
- Position: Point guard
- League: VTB United League

Personal information
- Born: May 22, 1992 (age 34) Chicago, Illinois, U.S.
- Listed height: 6 ft 2 in (1.88 m)
- Listed weight: 210 lb (95 kg)

Career information
- High school: Hales Franciscan (Chicago, Illinois)
- College: Tennessee State (2010–2014)
- NBA draft: 2014: undrafted
- Playing career: 2014–present

Career history
- 2014–2015: Beşiktaş
- 2015: Yeşilgiresun
- 2015–2016: Texas Legends
- 2016–2017: Sioux Falls Skyforce
- 2017: Leones de Santo Domingo
- 2017–2018: Partizan
- 2018: Gaziantep
- 2018–2019: ratiopharm Ulm
- 2019–2020: Boulazac
- 2020–2021: Ironi Ness Ziona
- 2021–2022: Juventus Utena
- 2022–2023: Brose Bamberg
- 2023–2024: Cairns Taipans
- 2024–present: Lokomotiv Kuban

Career highlights
- FIBA Europe Cup champion (2021); VTB United League assists leader (2025); Lithuanian League top scorer (2022); 2× First-team All-OVC (2013, 2014); OVC Freshman of the Year (2011); OVC All-Newcomer Team (2011)

Patrick Dominick Miller (born May 22, 1992) is an American professional basketball player for Lokomotiv Kuban of the VTB United League. He played college basketball for the Tennessee State Tigers.

== High school career ==
Miller played basketball at Chicago's Hales Franciscan High School, averaging 22.6 points and 3.8 assists per game in 32 games as a senior, leading his team to a 28–4 record, winning the Regional and Sectional Championships. He was named Chicago All-Area two times and was voted 2009–10 Chicago Catholic League Player of the Year.

== College career ==
Miller joined the Tennessee State Tigers as a freshman in 2010–11. In 2012–13, he led the Ohio Valley Conference with 5.8 assists per game and was named to the All-OVC first team. The following season, he scored 23.7 points per game to rank fifth in NCAA Division I.

== Professional career ==
On July 8, 2014, Miller signed with Beşiktaş of Turkey for the 2014–15 season. In January 2015, he left Beşiktaş after appearing in just three Eurocup games and joined Yeşilgiresun of the Turkish Basketball Second League for the rest of the season. In 25 games for Yeşilgiresun, he averaged 13.8 points, 3.0 rebounds, 3.6 assists and 1.2 steals per game while helping the team win the championship. On June 29, 2015, he extended his contract with Yeşilgiresun for the 2015–16 season. However, he later parted ways with the club on August 31.

On October 31, 2015, Miller was selected by the Oklahoma City Blue in the second round of the 2015 NBA Development League Draft, only to be traded to the Texas Legends on draft night. In 52 games, he averaged 11.9 points, 4.1 assists, 3.3 rebounds and 1.3 steals in 27 minutes per game.

On November 30, 2016, Miller was traded to the Sioux Falls Skyforce in exchange for the player rights to Byron Wesley and a 2017 third-round draft pick. On December 3, he made his debut for the Skyforce in a 117–101 win over the Iowa Energy, recording 14 points, one rebound, four assists and one block in 19 minutes off the bench.

On September 20, 2017, Miller signed a two-year deal with Serbian club Partizan. On January 14, 2018, he left Partizan and signed with Turkish club Gaziantep for the rest of the 2017–18 season.

On July 24, 2018, Miller signed with German team ratiopharm Ulm.

On October 29, 2019, Miller signed with Boulazac Basket Dordogne of LNB Pro A. He averaged 12.9 points, 2.6 rebounds and 5.1 assists per game.

On August 17, 2020, Miller signed with Ironi Nes Ziona of the Israeli Premier League.

On August 23, 2021, Miller signed with the Juventus Utena of the Lithuanian Basketball League (LKL). He led the league in scoring with 17.9 points per game.

On April 2, 2022, Miller signed with Qingdao Eagles of the Chinese Basketball Association (CBA). In July 2022, he arrived in China to join Qingdao Eagles for the CBA Summer League. He helped Qingdao Eagles won the CBA Summer League championship. In September 2022, he left the team. On November 7, he signed with Brose Bamberg of the Basketball Bundesliga (BBL).

On June 16, 2023, Miller signed with the Cairns Taipans in Australia for the 2023–24 NBL season. Following the NBL season, he joined Lokomotiv Kuban in Russia.
