= Jonah Mathews =

American basketball player (born 1998)

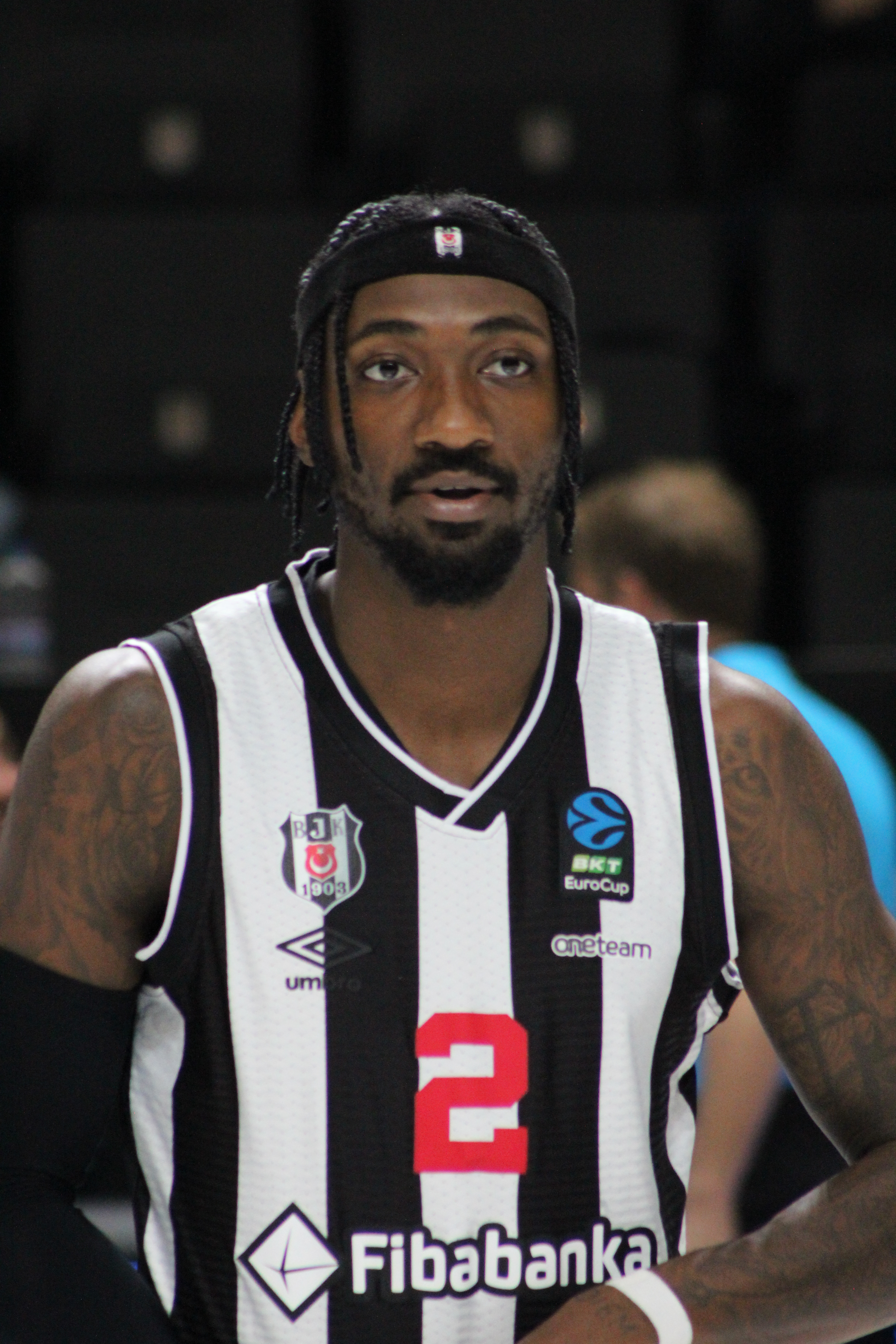
- Mathews with Beşiktaş

Free agent
- Position: Point guard / shooting guard

Personal information
- Born: February 10, 1998 (age 28) San Francisco, California, U.S.
- Listed height: 6 ft 3 in (1.91 m)
- Listed weight: 205 lb (93 kg)

Career information
- High school: Santa Monica (Santa Monica, California)
- College: USC (2016–2020)
- NBA draft: 2020: undrafted
- Playing career: 2020–present

Career history
- 2020–2021: Köping Stars
- 2021–2022: Anwil Włocławek
- 2022–2023: ASVEL
- 2023–2026: Beşiktaş

Career highlights
- Leaders Cup winner (2023); ENBL champion (2022); All-PLK Team (2022); PLK Top Scorer (2022); Second-team All-Pac-12 (2020); Pac-12 All-Defensive Team (2020)

Jonah Kenneth Mathews (born February 10, 1998) is an American professional basketball player who last played for Beşiktaş Gain of the Basketbol Süper Ligi (BSL). He played college basketball for the USC Trojans.

== High school career ==
Mathews attended Santa Monica High School. As a freshman, he was part of the team that won the Southern Section 1A championship. He helped Santa Monica win the Southern Section 1A title during his senior season, scoring 33 points in the championship game against Temecula Valley High School. Mathews averaged 24.1 points, 8.4 rebounds and 6.2 assists per game as a senior, earning 2016 CIF Southern Section Division 1A Player of the Year. A four-star prospect, he was ranked the No. 11 shooting guard and the No. 72 overall prospect in his high school class. In September 2015, Mathews committed to USC over Gonzaga and San Diego State, in part due to his relationship with Trojans assistant coach Jason Hart.

== College career ==
As a freshman at USC, Mathews averaged 7.0 points and 1.8 rebounds per game. Mathews was slowed by a sprained ankle during his sophomore season and endured a shooting slump, which he reversed by changing his pair of shoes. On March 10, 2018, Mathews scored a career-high 27 points in a 74–54 win over Oregon in the semifinal of the Pac-12 tournament. He averaged 9.3 points and 2.6 rebounds per game as a sophomore. Mathews started every game as a junior, averaging 12.6 points and 2.9 rebounds per game. On March 7, 2020, Mathews hit the game-winning three-pointer with one second remaining and finished with 19 points in a 54–52 win against UCLA. As a senior, Mathews averaged 13.4 points and 2.5 rebounds per game. He was named to the Second Team All-Pac-12 as well as the conference Defensive Team. Mathews finished his college career as the school leader in made three-pointers (247) and his 1,390 points ranks 17th on USC's all-time scoring list.

== Professional career ==
On September 4, 2020, Mathews signed his first professional contract with the Leicester Riders of the British Basketball League. However, he left the team on September 19, to prepare for the NBA draft. On December 22, 2020, Mathews signed with the Köping Stars of the Swedish Basketball League. He signed with the Saskatchewan Rattlers of the Canadian Elite Basketball League but did not join the team. On July 24, 2021, Mathews signed with Anwil Włocławek of the Polish Basketball League.

On July 1, 2022, he has signed with ASVEL of the French LNB Pro A.

On July 5, 2023, he has signed with Beşiktaş of the Turkish Basketbol Süper Ligi.

== Career statistics ==
Legend
GP	Games played	GS	Games started	MPG	Minutes per game
FG%	Field goal percentage	3P%	3-point field goal percentage	FT%	Free throw percentage
RPG	Rebounds per game	APG	Assists per game	SPG	Steals per game
BPG	Blocks per game	PPG	Points per game	**Bold**	Career high

=== College ===
Year	Team	GP	GS	MPG	FG%	3P%	FT%	RPG	APG	SPG	BPG	PPG
2016–17	USC	**35**	3	20.4	.372	.331	.692	1.8	1.1	.9	.1	7.0
2017–18	USC	34	23	27.1	**.458**	**.423**	.600	2.6	.9	.6	.1	9.3
2018–19	USC	33	**33**	**33.2**	.431	.392	.705	**2.9**	**2.2**	1.2	**.3**	12.6
2019–20	USC	31	28	32.1	.391	.381	**.740**	2.5	1.9	**1.4**	.2	**13.4**
Career		133	87	28.0	.414	.384	.698	2.5	1.5	1.0	.2	10.5

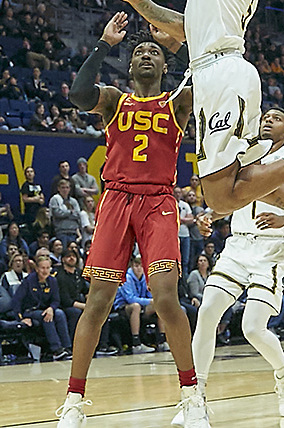

== Personal life ==
Mathews is the younger brother of professional basketball player Jordan Mathews. His father, Phil Mathews, is the head coach of Riverside City College. Mathews is interested in becoming a broadcaster after his playing days, and he took a broadcast journalism class at USC.
