= Jacek Winnicki =

Polish basketball coach

- Winnicki in 2024

Śląsk Wrocław
- Position: Assistant coach
- League: PLK

Personal information
- Born: 7 September 1967 (age 59)

Career history

Coaching
- 1997–2003: Śląsk Wrocław
- 2003–2007: Prokom Trefl Sopot (assistant)
- 2007–2008: Sportino Inowrocław
- 2008–2010: Lotos Gdynia
- 2010–2012: Turów Zgorzelec
- 2012–2014: CCC Polkowice
- 2012–2015: Poland
- 2014–2015: Fenerbahçe
- 2015–2017: Polski Cukier Toruń
- 2017–2019: MKS Dąbrowa Górnicza
- 2019: BM Slam Ostrów Wielkopolski
- 2019–2020: Spójnia Stargard
- 2021–2023: MKS Dąbrowa Górnicza
- 2025–present: Śląsk Wrocław (assistant)

Career highlights
- As head coach: PLK Coach of the Year (2011)

Jacek Winnicki (born 7 September 1967) is a Polish basketball coach. He is the assistant coach of Śląsk Wrocław of the Polish Basketball League (PLK).

== Honors ==
- (Poland) Śląsk Wrocław (1997-02) (Men's basketball, assistant coach)
  - Polish Basketball League: 1998, 1999, 2000, 2001, 2002
  - Polish Cup: 1997
- (Poland) Śląsk Wrocław (2002–03) (Men's basketball, head coach)
- (Poland) Asseco Gdynia (2003–07) (Men's basketball, assistant coach)
  - Polish Basketball League: 2004, 2005, 2006, 2007
  - Polish Cup: 2006
- (Poland) Sportino Inowrocław (2007–08) (Men's basketball, head coach)
  - Polish 2nd Basketball League: 2008
- (Poland) Lotos Gdynia (2008–10) (Women's basketball, head coach)
  - Polish Women's Basketball League: 2009, 2010
  - Polish Cup: 2010
- (Poland) Turów Zgorzelec (2010–12) (Men's basketball, head coach)
- (Poland) CCC Polkowice (2012–14) (Women's basketball, head coach)
  - Polish Women's Basketball League: 2013
  - Polish Cup: 2013
- (Turkey) Fenerbahçe Istanbul (2014-2015) (Women's basketball, head coach)
  - Turkish Super Cup: 2014
  - Turkish Cup: 2015
