= Jimmie Taylor =

American basketball player

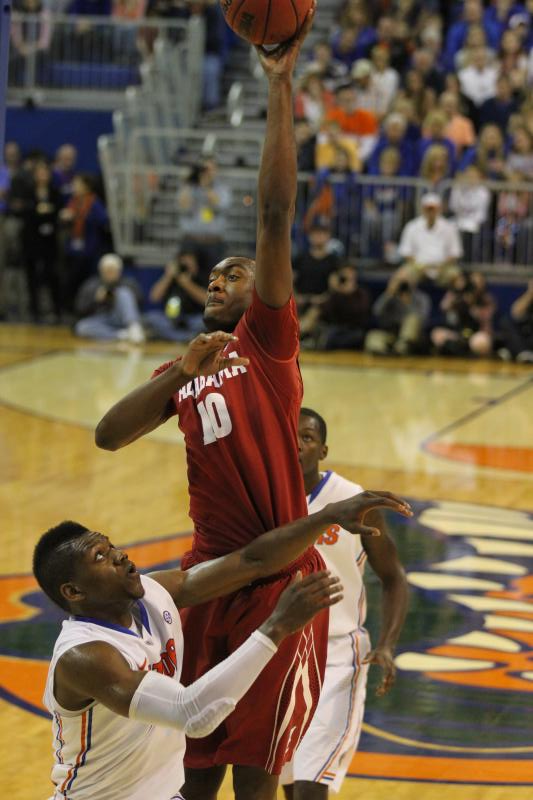

No. 1 – APOEL
- Position: Center
- League: Cypriot Division A

Personal information
- Born: September 3, 1995 (age 31) Eutaw, Alabama, U.S.
- Listed height: 6 ft 10 in (2.08 m)
- Listed weight: 248 lb (112 kg)

Career information
- High school: Greensboro (Greensboro, Alabama)
- College: Alabama (2013–2017)
- NBA draft: 2017: undrafted
- Playing career: 2017–present

Career history
- 2017–2018: Sioux Falls Skyforce
- 2018–2019: Panionios
- 2019: Spójnia Stargard
- 2019: Meralco Bolts
- 2019–2020: Start Lublin
- 2020–2021: Champagne Châlons-Reims
- 2021–2022: Start Lublin
- 2022–2023: Debreceni EAC
- 2023–2024: Anorthosis Ammochostou
- 2024–2025: CS Dinamo București
- 2025–present: APOEL

Career highlights
- Cypriot League All-Star (2023)

Jimmie Taylor (born September 3, 1995) is an American professional basketball player for APOEL of the Cypriot Division A. He played college basketball at Alabama.

== College career ==
Taylor played four seasons for the Alabama Crimson Tide and played in 133 career games (2nd-most in school history) with 99 starts. Over the course of his collegiate career, he averaged 4.7 points, 4.2 rebounds and 1.5 blocked shots per game. Taylor finished sixth all-time in blocks in Crimson Tide history, recording 205 blocks during his collegiate career.

== Professional career ==
=== Sioux Falls Skyforce ===
Taylor was drafted with the eighth pick in the second round of the 2017 NBA G League draft by the Sioux Falls Skyforce. In his first season of professional basketball, Taylor averaged 7.0 points, 5.5 rebounds, and 1.9 blocks over 28 games.

=== Panionios ===
Taylor signed with Panionios of the Greek Basket League (GBL) on September 20, 2018. Following disciplinary issues, he parted ways with the team on February 4, 2019, after averaging 7 points and 5.3 rebounds in 16 games.

=== Spójnia Stargard ===
Taylor signed with Spójnia Stargard of the Polish Basketball League (PLK) on March 15, 2019, through the end of the season. Taylor averaged 10.8 points, 8.4 rebounds, and 1.4 blocks per game in 8 PLK games as Spójnia finished 13th in the PLK standings.

=== Meralco Bolts ===
On June 14, 2019, Taylor signed with the Meralco Bolts of the Philippine Basketball Association as a replacement for Gani Lawal as the team's import for the 2019 PBA Commissioner's Cup. Taylor was released after appearing in one game for the Bolts, scoring 13 points and grabbing 18 rebounds in a loss to TNT KaTropa, after the team reinstated Lawal.

=== Start Lublin ===
On September 25, 2019, Taylor returned to the PLK after signing with Start Lublin. Taylor averaged 9.4 points and was second in the PLK in rebounds and sixth in blocks, averaging 8.7 rebounds and 1.1 blocks in 22 games until the season was ended early due to the coronavirus pandemic.

=== Chalons-Reims ===
On June 29, 2020, Taylor signed with Champagne Châlons-Reims Basket of the French LNB Pro A.

=== Return to Start Lublin ===
On June 29, 2021, Taylor signed for a second stint with Start Lublin of the Polish Basketball League.
