= Mateusz Kostrzewski =

Polish basketball player (born 1989)

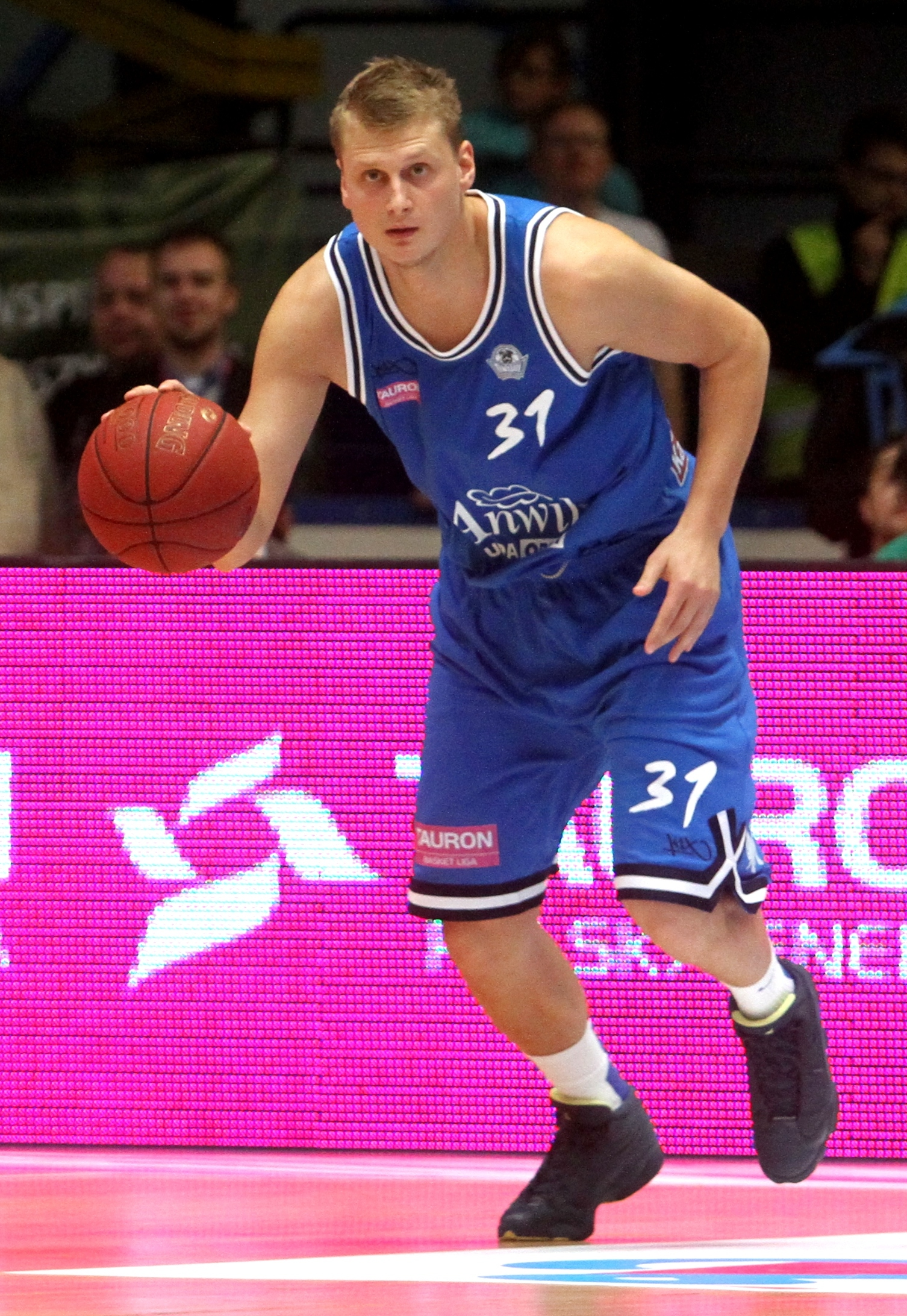
- Kostrzewski with Włocławek in 2013

No. 31 – Wilki Morskie Szczecin
- Position: Small forward
- League: PLK

Personal information
- Born: 18 September 1989 (age 37) Elbląg, Poland
- Listed height: 6 ft 7 in (2.01 m)
- Listed weight: 183 lb (83 kg)

Career information
- NBA draft: 2011: undrafted
- Playing career: 2006–present

Career history
- 2006–2008: OSSM PZKosz Sopot
- 2008–2012: Prokom Trefl Sopot / Asseco Gdynia
- 2012–2013: Czarni Słupsk
- 2013–2014: Anwil Włocławek
- 2014–2017: Turów Zgorzelec
- 2017–2018: Stal Ostrów Wielkopolski
- 2018–2019: Anwil Włocławek
- 2019: Stal Ostrów Wielkopolski
- 2019–2021: Spójnia Stargard
- 2021–2022: Start Lublin
- 2022–2023: Wilki Morskie Szczecin
- 2023–2024: Anwil Włocławek
- 2024–present: Wilki Morskie Szczecin

Career highlights
- 4x Polish League champion (2009, 2010, 2014, 2023); Polish Cup champion (2019); Polish Cup MVP (2019)

Mateusz Kostrzewski (born 18 September 1989) is a Polish professional basketball player for Wilki Morskie Szczecin of the Polish Basketball League (PLK).

== Professional career ==
After many years as a successful player in Poland's youth divisions, Kostrzewski started his professional career for the division 3 team OSSM PZKosz Sopot where he gained experience and played for Gdynia's junior team as well. In 2008 he had his first games for Gdynia's senior team and played his first Euroleague game in 2010. Between 2008 and 2010, he gained further experience at Gdynia's 2nd and 3rd team as well as its youth teams.

In the 2018–19 season, he won the Polish Basketball Cup with Stal Ostrów Wielkopolski and was named the tournament's Most Valuable Player. The following season, he averaged 13.1 points and 5.6 rebounds per game. On 6 June 2020 he extended his contract for an additional season.

On 26 July 2021 he signed with Start Lublin of the PLK.

On June 28, 2023, he signed with Anwil Włocławek of the Polish Basketball League (PLK).

On August 6, 2024, he signed with Wilki Morskie Szczecin of the Polish Basketball League (PLK) for a second stint.

== Achievements ==
=== Individual ===
- 2008: Polish U20 Championships All-Tournament 1st Team
- 2007: Poland national under-18 basketball team
- 2008, 2009: Poland national under-20 basketball team
- 2010: Poland national basketball team
- 2019: Polish Cup MVP

=== With the club ===
- 2008: Polish U20 Championships Finalist
- 2009: Polish Cup Finalist
- 2019: Polish Cup winner
- 2009, 2010, 2015, 2023: Polish League Champion
- 2010: Euroleague Quarterfinals
