= Stal Ostrów Wielkopolski =

Men's basketball team in Poland

Tasomix Rosiek Stal Ostrów Wielkopolski
- Leagues: PLK
- Founded: 1947; 79 years ago
- Arena: Arena Ostrów
- Capacity: 3,086
- Location: Ostrów Wielkopolski, Poland
- Team colors: Blue, Gold, White
- Main sponsor: Arged; BM Slam; Miasto Ostrów Wielkopolski
- President: Bartosz Karasiński
- Vice-president: Grzegorz Ardeli
- Head coach: Andrzej Urban
- Team captain: Daniel Gołębiowski
- Ownership: Paweł Matuszewski; Marcin Napierała
- Championships: 1 Polish League; 2 Polish Cups; 1 Polish Supercup; 1 ENBL
- Website: stalostrow.com
Home	Away

Stal Ostrów Wielkopolski, also known as Tasomix Rosiek Stal Ostrów Wielkopolski for sponsorship reasons, is a Polish professional basketball team, based in Ostrów Wielkopolski. They play in the Polish Basketball League (PLK) since its promotion back in 2015. The club won the Polish national championship in 2021 and the Polish Cup in 2019 and 2022. Since then, Stal has also been active at the European stage in the Basketball Champions League and FIBA Europe Cup.

The home arena of the team is the Arena Ostrów.

== History ==
The original, non-sponsored club logo

In 2015, Stal promoted from the second-tier I Liga to the PLK. In its first season, the team finished 13th in the standings with a 12–20 record. In the 2016–17 season, Stal had a historic season as the team reached the semi-finals of the PLK after defeating MKS Dąbrowa Górnicza 3–0 in the quarter-finals. In the semi-finals, Stal lost to Stelmet Zielona Góra but won the third place series against Energa Czarni Słupsk.

In the 2017–18 season, Stal had an even more successful season as the team reached the PLK finals for the first time after defeating Polski Cukier Toruń. In the Finals, the team lost to Anwil Włocławek, 2–4.

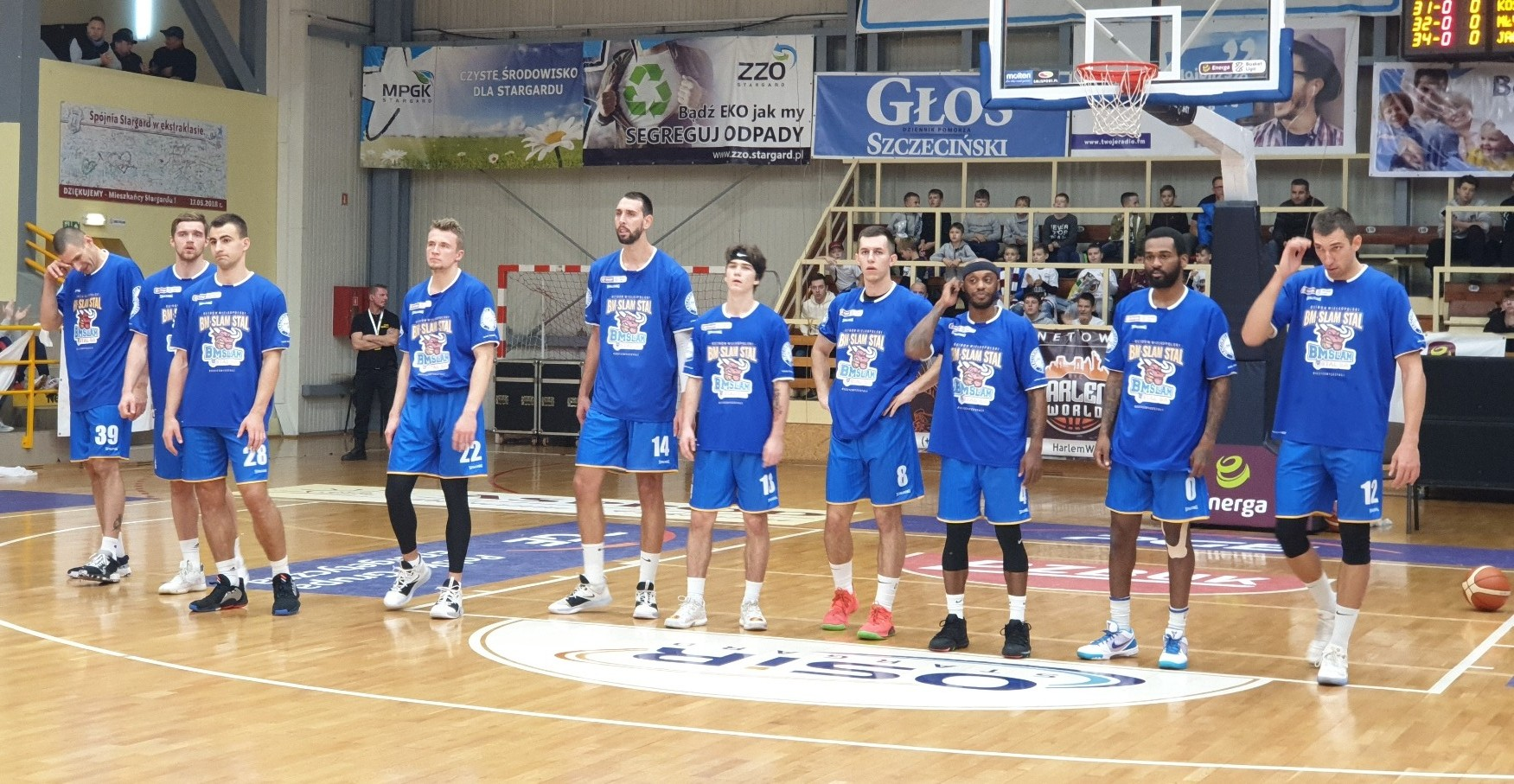
Stal team in 2019

In 2019, Stal won the Polish Basketball Cup after defeating Arka Gdynia 77–74 in the final. It was the first ever trophy for the club.

In the 2020–21 season, Stal played in the FIBA Europe Cup and reached the Final Four of the tournament. It reached the finals where it lost to Israeli club Ironi Ness Ziona. Later that season, Stal won the finals of the 2020–21 PLK season, winning its first Polish championship in club history. Guard Jakub Garbacz was named the PLK Finals MVP.

A new era started in 2022 when previous assistant Andrzej Urban was promoted to head coach. The team management reoriented its roster composition philosophy, focusing more on European foreigners. With players like Aigars Šķēle, Ojārs Siliņš and Nemanja Đurišić, Stal hit the mark and won its first Polish Supercup. By winning the European North Basketball League, Stal won its first international title. Urban's debut season ended with bronze in the Polish league. Before his second season with the team, Latvian international Šķēle became the first ever current state Stal Ostrów Wielkopolski player in the FIBA Basketball World Cup.

== Arenas ==
For most of its existence, the team played in the Hala Sportowa Stal, which had a capacity of 1,800 people. Since 2020, the club plays its home games in the Arena Ostrów, which has capacity for 3,000 people. The arena cost 31 million PLN and was built by local company Bud-Rem.

== Players ==
=== Current roster ===
Note: Flags indicate national team eligibility at FIBA-sanctioned events. Players may hold other non-FIBA nationalities not displayed.

Stal Ostrów Wielkopolski roster
Players
Coaches

Pos.	No.	Nat.	Name	Ht.	Age
G	1	(United States)	Billups, Jared	1.93 m (6 ft 4 in)	23 – 24 October 2002
G	2	(Poland)	Wiśniewski, Aleksander	1.92 m (6 ft 4 in)	23 – 13 January 2003
G	3	(United States)	Jones, Tajion	1.96 m (6 ft 5 in)	26 – 2 November 1999
G/F	6	(Poland)	Gołębiowski, Daniel (C)	1.95 m (6 ft 5 in)	28 – 6 February 1998
SF	8	(Poland)	Czoska, Nikodem	2.03 m (6 ft 8 in)	24 – 22 April 2002
PF	9	(Estonia)	Lips, Karl Johan	2.00 m (6 ft 7 in)	30 – 20 July 1996
PG	12	(United States)	Hunter, Jaylin	1.83 m (6 ft 0 in)	25 – 13 November 2000
SG	14	(Poland)	Soszyński, Szymon	1.93 m (6 ft 4 in)	20 – 6 November 2005
C	41	(Poland)	Parzeński, Jakub	2.12 m (6 ft 11 in)	34 – 3 December 1991
F/C	67	(Ukraine)	Bobrov, Vyacheslav	2.03 m (6 ft 8 in)	34 – 19 September 1992

Head coach

- (Poland) Andrzej Urban

Assistant coach(es)

- (Poland) Konrad Kaźmierczyk

Legend

- (C) Team captain
- Injured

- Roster
Updated: October 4, 2026

=== Depth chart ===
Pos.	Starting 5	Bench
C	Jakub Parzenski
PF	Karl Johan Lips
SF	Daniel Golebiowski
SG	Jared Billups	Taijon Jones
PG	Jaylin Hunter

=== Squad changes for the 2026–27 season ===
==== In ====
Note: Flags indicate national team, as has been defined under FIBA eligibility rules. Players may hold more than one non-FIBA nationality.

No.	Pos.	Nat.	Player
	PF	(Estonia) EST	Karl Johan Lips (from (Estonia) Tartu Ülikool)
	G	(United States) USA	Tajion Jones (from (Italy) New Basket Brindisi)
	G	(United States) USA	Jared Billups (from (Finland) Tampereen Pyrintö)

==== Out ====
Note: Flags indicate national team, as has been defined under FIBA eligibility rules. Players may hold more than one non-FIBA nationality.

No.	Pos.	Nat.	Player
	PG	(Canada) CAN	Luka Šakota (from (Poland) Twarde Pierniki Toruń)

== Honours ==
Polish Basketball League

- Winners (1): 2020-21

Polish Basketball Cup

- Winners (2): 2019, 2022
- Runners-up (1): 2024

Polish Basketball Supercup

- Winners (1): 2022
- Runners-up (2): 2019, 2021

FIBA Europe Cup

- Runners-up (1): 2020–21

European North Basketball League

- Winners (1): (2023)

== Sponsorship names ==
The team has also been known as:

- BM Slam Stal Ostrów Wielkopolski (2012–2013)
- Intermarché Bricomarché (2013–2015)
- BM Slam Stal Ostrów Wielkopolski (2015–2024)
- Tasomix Rosiek Stal Ostrów Wielkopolski (2024–present)

== Season by season ==
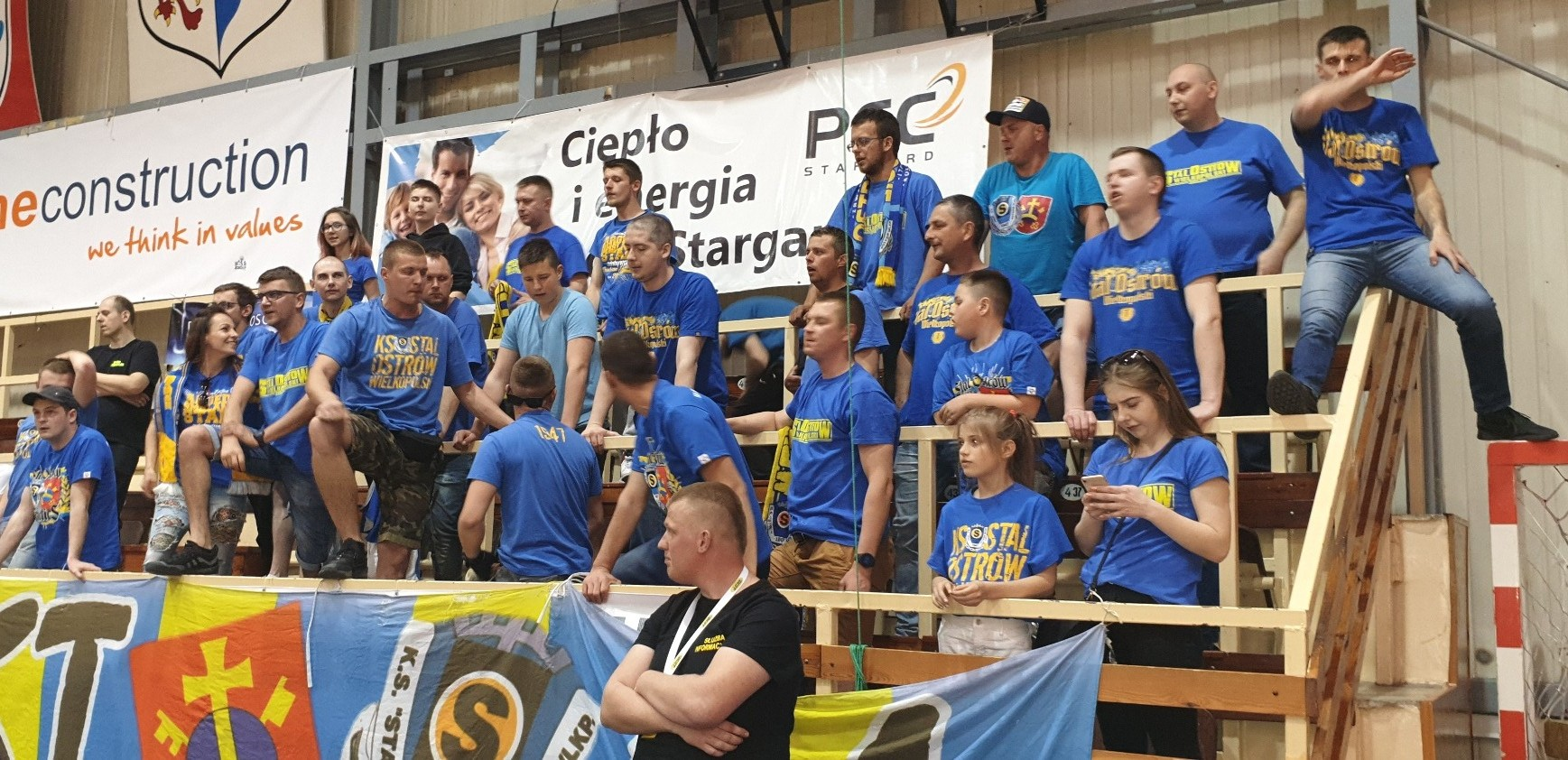
Fans of Stal in 2019

Season	Tier	League	Pos.	Polish Cup	European competitions		
2011–12	3	II Liga	2nd				
2012–13	2	I Liga	9th				
2013–14	2	I Liga	9th				
2014–15	2	I Liga	1st				
2015–16	1	PLK	13th				
2016–17	1	PLK	3rd				
2017–18	1	PLK	2nd		4 FIBA Europe Cup	QR1	1–1
2018–19	1	PLK	5th	Champions			
2019–20	1	PLK	9th				
2020–21	1	PLK	1st	Semi-finalist	4 FIBA Europe Cup	RU	6–1
2021–22	1	PLK	5th	Champions	3 Champions League	RS	1–5
2022–23	1	PLK	3rd	Quarter-finalist	European North Basketball League	1st	8–3
2023–24	1	PLK	3rd	Runner-up			
2024–25	1	PLK	13th				
2025–26	1	PLK	10th				

== European record ==
Season	Competition	Round	Club	Home	Away
2017–18	FIBA Europe Cup	QR1	(Israel) Bnei Herzliya	65–64	74-84
2020–21	FIBA Europe Cup	RS	(Hungary) Szolnoki Olaj		90-80
2020–21	FIBA Europe Cup	RS	(Portugal) Sporting	85-83	
2020–21	FIBA Europe Cup	RS	(Israel) Ironi Ness Ziona		93-86
2020–21	FIBA Europe Cup	RO16	(Netherlands) Heroes Den Bosch		92-83
2020–21	FIBA Europe Cup	QF	(Belgium) Belfius Mons-Hainaut		73-66
2020–21	FIBA Europe Cup	SF	(Romania) CSM Oradea		77-66
2020–21	FIBA Europe Cup	Final	(Israel) Ironi Ness Ziona		74-82
2021–22	FIBA BCL	RS	(Spain) Baxi Manresa	75-88	76-81
2021–22	FIBA BCL	RS	(Turkey) Pinar Karşıyaka	69-86	77-80
2021–22	FIBA BCL	RS	(Israel) Hapoel Jerusalem	76-65	76-83
2022-23	ENBL	RS	(Israel) Ironi Ness Ziona	92-76	
2022-23	ENBL	RS	(Poland) King Szczecin	56-72	
2022-23	ENBL	RS	(Czech Republic) Basket Brno		80-59
2022-23	ENBL	RS	(Latvia) Valmiera Glass VIA		94-71
2022-23	ENBL	RS	(Estonia) Tartu Ülikool Maks & Moorits		84-65
2022-23	ENBL	RS	(Lithuania) BC Wolves	75-85	
2022-23	ENBL	QF	(Poland) Zielona Góra	101-80	94-97
2022-23	ENBL	SF	(Poland) Start Lublin	86-74	
2022-23	ENBL	Final	(Lithuania) BC Wolves	70-66	

== Individual awards ==
Award	Players
PLK Most Valuable Player	Shawn King (2017)
Polish Basketball Cup MVP	Mateusz Kostrzewski (2019)
PLK Finals MVP	Jakub Garbacz (2021)
European North Basketball League Finals MVP	Damian Kulig (2023)

== Notable players ==
Note: Flags indicate national team eligibility at FIBA-sanctioned events. Players may hold other non-FIBA nationalities not displayed.

Criteria

To appear in this section a player must have either:

- Set a club record or won an individual award while at the club
- Played at least one official international match for their national team at any time
- Played at least one official NBA match at any time.

- (Finland) Carl Lindbom
- (Greece) Vangelis Mantzaris
- (Saint Vincent and the Grenadines) Shawn King
- (Poland) Mateusz Kostrzewski
- (Poland) Szymon Szewczyk
- (Poland) Jakub Garbacz
- (Poland) Damian Kulig
- (Latvia) Ojārs Siliņš
- (Latvia) Aigars Šķēle
- (Montenegro) Nemanja Đurišić
- (United States) Aaron Johnson
- (United States) Kobi Simmons
- (United States) Adonis Thomas

== Head coaches ==
- (Poland) Andrzej Kowalczyk: 1994–2004, 2005–2009
- (Poland) Kasper Smektała: 2009–2010
- (Poland) Mikołaj Czaja: 2010–2013, 2014–2015
- (Poland) Krzysztof Szablowski: 2013–2014
- (Serbia) Zoran Sretenović: 2015–2016
- (North Macedonia) Emil Rajković: 2016–2018
- (Poland) Wojciech Kamiński: 2018–2019
- (Poland) Jacek Winnicki: 2019
- (Poland) Łukasz Majewski: 2019–2020
- (Croatia) (Poland) Igor Miličić: 2020–2022
- (Poland) Andrzej Urban: 2022–present
