= 2011 PLK All Star Match =

Basketball match held in Kalisz, Poland

The 2011 Polish Basketball League All Star Match was the 18th edition of the Polish Basketball League All Star Match, held on 16 January 2011 at the Kalisz Arena in Kalisz, Poland. The game was broadcast live by TVP Sport.

The event featured a North–South format, with the South team defeating the North 119–117 in a closely contested match. Harding Nana of the South team was named the Most Valuable Player (MVP), contributing 24 points, 7 rebounds, 3 steals, and 1 block.

In addition to the main game, the event included a slam dunk contest and a three-point shootout. Streetball player Łukasz Biedny won the slam dunk contest, defeating Cameron Bennerman and Eddie Miller. Darnell Hinson claimed victory in the three-point shootout, outperforming Andrzej Pluta and Ivan Koljević.

== Venue ==
Kalisz Arena
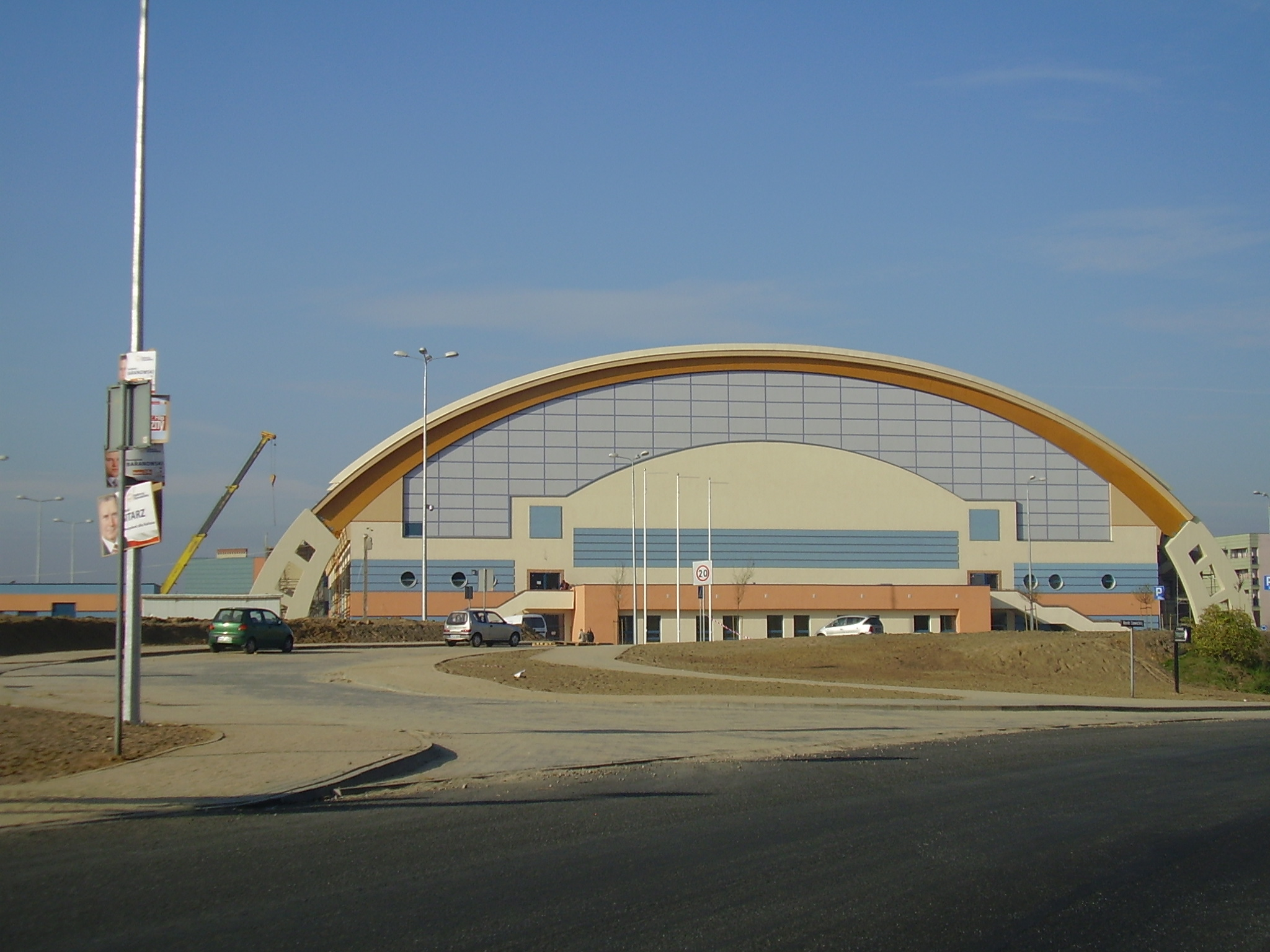
Exterior of Kalisz Arena

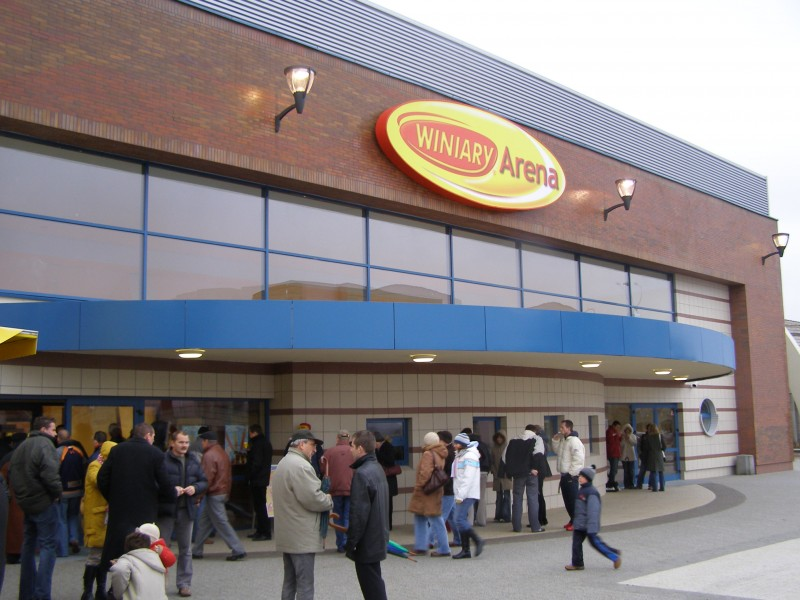
Entrance to Kalisz Arena

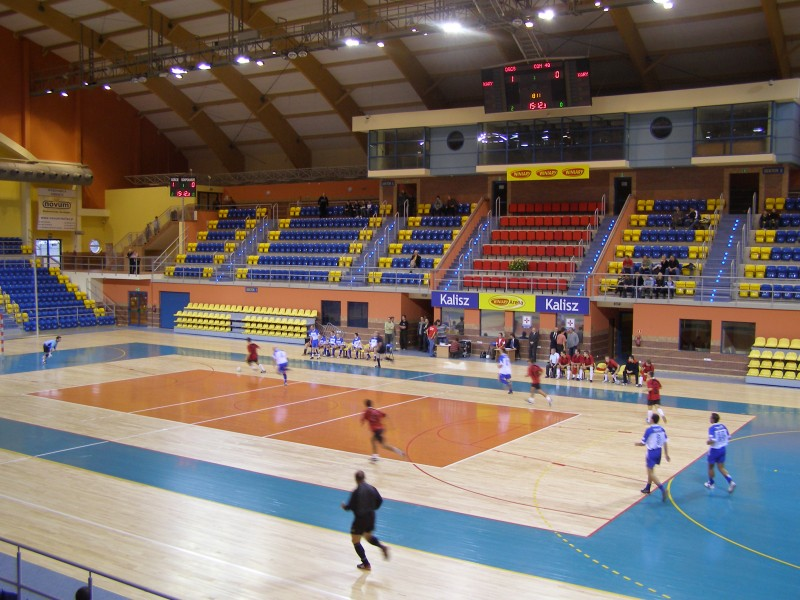
Interior of Kalisz Arena

Several cities, including Zielona Góra, Katowice, Wrocław, Poznań, and Kalisz, competed to host the 2011 All Star Match. However, scheduling conflicts made it impossible to hold the event in Katowice, where the Spodek arena was unavailable, or in Wrocław, where the Centennial Hall was under renovation. As a result, the CRS Hall Zielona Góra emerged as a strong candidate. Ultimately, the Polish Basketball League selected the Kalisz Arena, which has a capacity of 3,164 spectators. This marked the first time Kalisz hosted the PLK All Star Match.

== Participants ==
=== Voting ===
==== Rules ====
Unlike the 2010 PLK All Star Match, voting for the 2011 event was conducted through both SMS and a dedicated website, meczgwiazd.plk.pl. Fans could vote for the starting lineups of both teams and had an advisory role in selecting slam dunk contest participants, with the final list determined by the Polish Basketball League board.

==== Nominees ====
The Polish Basketball League nominated 60 players, evenly split between 30 from the North and 30 from the South. Each region included 12 guards, 12 forwards, and 6 centers.

===== Guards =====
- Cameron Bennerman, Energa Czarni Słupsk
- Jerel Blassingame, Energa Czarni Słupsk
- Mantas Česnauskis, Energa Czarni Słupsk
- Kamil Chanas, Polpharma Starogard Gdański
- Daniel Ewing, Asseco Prokom Gdynia
- Anthony Fisher, Kotwica Kołobrzeg
- Winsome Frazier, AZS Koszalin
- Giedrius Gustas, Trefl Sopot
- Igor Miličić, AZS Koszalin
- Ted Scott, Kotwica Kołobrzeg
- Robert Skibniewski, Polpharma Starogard Gdański
- Deonta Vaughn, Polpharma Starogard Gdański

===== Forwards =====
- Zbigniew Białek, Energa Czarni Słupsk
- Slaviša Bogavac, AZS Koszalin
- Tomasz Cielebąk, Polpharma Starogard Gdański
- Filip Dylewicz, Trefl Sopot
- Michael Hicks, Polpharma Starogard Gdański
- Lawrence Kinnard, Trefl Sopot
- Paweł Leończyk, Energa Czarni Słupsk
- George Reese, AZS Koszalin
- Marcin Stefański, Trefl Sopot
- Adam Waczyński, Trefl Sopot

===== Centers =====
- Kirk Archibeque, Polpharma Starogard Gdański
- Dragan Ćeranić, Trefl Sopot
- Bryan Davis, Energa Czarni Słupsk
- Darrell Harris, Kotwica Kołobrzeg
- Adam Łapeta, Asseco Prokom Gdynia
- Ratko Varda, Asseco Prokom Gdynia

===== Guards =====
- Dardan Berisha, Anwil Włocławek
- Darnell Hinson, Polonia Warszawa
- Walter Hodge, Zastal Zielona Góra
- Ivan Koljević, PGE Turów Zgorzelec
- David Jackson, PGE Turów Zgorzelec
- Eddie Miller, PBG Basket Poznań
- Marcin Nowakowski, Polonia Warszawa
- Stanley Pringle, Siarka Tarnobrzeg
- Andrzej Pluta, Anwil Włocławek
- Chris Thomas, Anwil Włocławek
- Torey Thomas, PGE Turów Zgorzelec
- D.J. Thompson, Anwil Włocławek

===== Forwards =====
- Marko Brkić, PGE Turów Zgorzelec
- Jakub Dłoniak, Zastal Zielona Góra
- Žarko Čomagić, Zastal Zielona Góra
- Tony Easley, Polonia Warszawa
- Kevin Goffney, Siarka Tarnobrzeg
- Nikola Jovanović, Anwil Włocławek
- Harding Nana, Polonia Warszawa
- Piotr Stelmach, PBG Basket Poznań
- Louis Truscott, Siarka Tarnobrzeg
- Daniel Wall, Siarka Tarnobrzeg
- Łukasz Wichniarz, Polonia Warszawa
- Konrad Wysocki, PGE Turów Zgorzelec

===== Centers =====
- Chris Burgess, Zastal Zielona Góra
- Eric Hicks, Anwil Włocławek
- Paul Miller, Anwil Włocławek
- Patrick Okafor, PBG Basket Poznań
- Vladimir Tica, PBG Basket Poznań
- Ivan Žigeranović, PGE Turów Zgorzelec

===== Voting process =====
Voting began on 20 December 2010 and concluded on 5 January 2011 at 11:59 PM. Partial results were published on 27 December 2010 and 3 January 2011. In the first week, Chris Burgess and Walter Hodge led the voting. The North's starting lineup at that point included Cameron Bennerman, Zbigniew Białek, Bryan Davis, Daniel Ewing, and J.R. Giddens, while the South's lineup featured Hodge, Burgess, Jakub Dłoniak, Andrzej Pluta, and Harding Nana. Bennerman led the slam dunk contest voting with 61.6% of the votes.

After two weeks, Burgess and Hodge remained the top vote-getters. The North's lineup shifted to include Igor Miličić, Slaviša Bogavac, Bennerman, Białek, and Ratko Varda, while the South's lineup remained unchanged. Bennerman continued to lead the slam dunk contest voting. Votes for Jan Jagla and J.R. Giddens were voided after they left Asseco Prokom Gdynia.

According to the regulations, voting ended on 5 January 2011 at 11:59 PM. Official results and contest participant lists were announced on 11 January 2011 during a press conference in Warsaw. A total of 7,527 fans voted online, and 1,841 voted via SMS, casting 88,779 votes – a record for PLK All Star Matchs. Igor Miličić received the most votes (2,745), followed by Walter Hodge (2,559) and Slaviša Bogavac (2,425). The North's starting lineup included Miličić, Bennerman, Bogavac, Białek, and Varda, while the South's lineup featured Hodge, Pluta, Nana, Dłoniak, and Burgess. In the slam dunk contest voting, Bennerman led with 1,791 votes, followed by Bryan Davis (1,373) and Eddie Miller (1,280), with 2,917 total voters.

==== Rosters ====
The official rosters were announced on 11 January 2011. Fans selected the starting lineups, while the Polish Basketball League board chose the reserves. Kevin Goffney withdrew due to a knee injury and was replaced by Ivan Koljević. Mantas Česnauskis withdrew due to illness, with Jerel Blassingame named as his replacement. However, Blassingame also withdrew two days before the game due to a meniscus injury. Coaches were selected based on the highest-ranking teams in the 2010–11 Polish Basketball League standings as of 4 January 2011: Dainius Adomaitis for the North and Jacek Winnicki for the South.

===== North =====
Starting lineup

- Igor Miličić
- Cameron Bennerman
- Slaviša Bogavac
- Zbigniew Białek
- Ratko Varda

Reserves

- Daniel Ewing
- Filip Dylewicz
- Michael Hicks
- Bryan Davis
- Ted Scott
- Adam Waczyński

===== South =====
Starting lineup

- Walter Hodge
- Andrzej Pluta
- Harding Nana
- Jakub Dłoniak
- Chris Burgess

Reserves

- Torey Thomas
- Eddie Miller
- Darnell Hinson
- Ivan Koljević
- Nikola Jovanović
- Marko Brkić
- Tony Easley

== Event details ==
=== Three-point shootout ===
==== Qualifiers ====
Qualifiers for the three-point shootout took place on 15 January 2011 at 2:30 PM at the Automotive Schools Complex in Kalisz. Six players from the Kalisz Amateur Basketball League participated: Patryk Kowalski, Piotr Satanowski, Kamil Stasik, Paweł Kawczyński, Adrian Kruszankin, and Marek Szczepański. In the first round, Satanowski scored 16 points, followed by Kowalski with 12. In the final, both achieved identical scores, but Satanowski won and advanced to the main three-point shootout on 16 January.

==== Participants ====
- Eddie Miller
- Ivan Koljević
- Darnell Hinson
- Andrzej Pluta
- Michael Hicks
- Piotr Satanowski

==== Competition ====
The three-point shootout, the 14th in PLK All Star history, took place on 16 January 2011. The main favourite was Andrzej Pluta, who had previously won this type of contest six times at the Polish League All Star Games, losing only once since 2000 – in 2007, when he was defeated in a tiebreaker by Marcin Kosiński. Each participant took 25 shots (five from each of five positions), with each made shot worth one point, except the final shot per position, worth two points. The main qualifiers began at 5:03 PM. Pluta and Koljević tied for first with 21 points each, advancing to the final. The remaining four competed in a playoff round during the break between the first and second quarters, with each player and a fan taking five shots. Darnell Hinson and his fan, Rafał, scored four points to advance. In the final, held between the third and fourth quarters, Hinson scored 21 points, Koljević 18, and Pluta 19, making Hinson the champion.

=== Slam dunk contest ===
==== Qualifiers ====
Qualifiers for the slam dunk contest were held on 15 January 2011 at 12:00 PM at the Automotive Schools Complex in Kalisz. Polish streetball players Piotr Nawojski, Łukasz Biedny, Emil Olszewski, Mirosław Śleziak, and Maciej Patyk competed. Emil Olszewski, the Polish streetball champion, was the favorite. Olszewski scored 144 points in three attempts but was outscored in the top two attempts by Nawojski and Biedny, who each scored 100 points. In the final, Biedny scored 94 points to Nawojski's 85, earning a spot in the main contest.

==== Participants ====
- Bryan Davis
- Ted Scott
- Cameron Bennerman
- Eddie Miller
- Tony Easley
- Łukasz Biedny

==== Competition ====
The slam dunk contest, the 15th in PLK All Star history, took place on 16 January 2011. Cameron Bennerman and defending champion Eddie Miller were the favorites. The main qualifiers began at 5:20 PM, with each participant performing two dunks, scored from 0 to 5 by five judges: Maciej Zieliński, Adam Wójcik, Janusz Pęcherz, Dariusz Grodziński, and Jacek Jakubowski. Failed attempts scored zero. Łukasz Biedny (46/50 points), Bennerman (44), and Miller (42) advanced to the final, while Bryan Davis (17) and Ted Scott (0) were eliminated. The final, held between the second and third quarters, was judged by Zieliński, Wójcik, Pęcherz, Jakubowski, and Marek Feruga (replacing Grodziński). Scores from both rounds were combined. Biedny won with a perfect 50 points in the final, totaling 96/100, with dunks over two friends and a group of cheerleaders and a mascot. Bennerman scored 87 points for second place, and Miller scored 67 for third. Biedny became the fifth Pole and the first amateur to win the PLK slam dunk contest.

=== All Star Match ===
Bold indicates starting lineup
North coach: Dainius Adomaitis (Energa Czarni Słupsk)
South coach: Jacek Winnicki (PGE Turów Zgorzelec)

North – 117				South – 119			
Player	Country	Team	Pts	Player	Country	Team	Pts
**Cameron Bennerman**	USA	Energa Czarni Słupsk	22	**Harding Nana**	CMR	Polonia Warszawa	24
Bryan Davis	USA	Energa Czarni Słupsk	19	**Walter Hodge**	PRI/VIR	Zastal Zielona Góra	12
**Ratko Varda**	BIH	Asseco Prokom Gdynia	19	Tony Easley	USA	Polonia Warszawa	12
Daniel Ewing	USA	Asseco Prokom Gdynia	13	**Andrzej Pluta**	POL	Anwil Włocławek	11
Ted Scott	USA	Kotwica Kołobrzeg	8	Darnell Hinson	USA	Polonia Warszawa	11
Michael Hicks	USA	Polpharma Starogard Gdański	8	Eddie Miller	USA	PBG Basket Poznań	10
Adam Waczyński	POL	Trefl Sopot	8	**Chris Burgess**	USA	Zastal Zielona Góra	9
Filip Dylewicz	POL	Trefl Sopot	7	Nikola Jovanović	SRB	Anwil Włocławek	8
**Zbigniew Białek**	POL	Energa Czarni Słupsk	6	Ivan Koljević	MNE	PGE Turów Zgorzelec	7
**Igor Miličić**	CRO/POL	AZS Koszalin	5	**Jakub Dłoniak**	POL	Zastal Zielona Góra	7
**Slaviša Bogavac**	SRB	AZS Koszalin	3	Torey Thomas	USA	PGE Turów Zgorzelec	3
				Marko Brkić	SRB	PGE Turów Zgorzelec	3

==== Game summary ====
===== Pre-game =====
The event began with an official presentation at 5:50 PM, featuring a violin performance and a laser show. Players were introduced individually, emerging from behind a sliding screen and walking down a red carpet. PLK president Jacek Jakubowski and Kalisz mayor Janusz Pęcherz officially opened the event.

===== First quarter =====
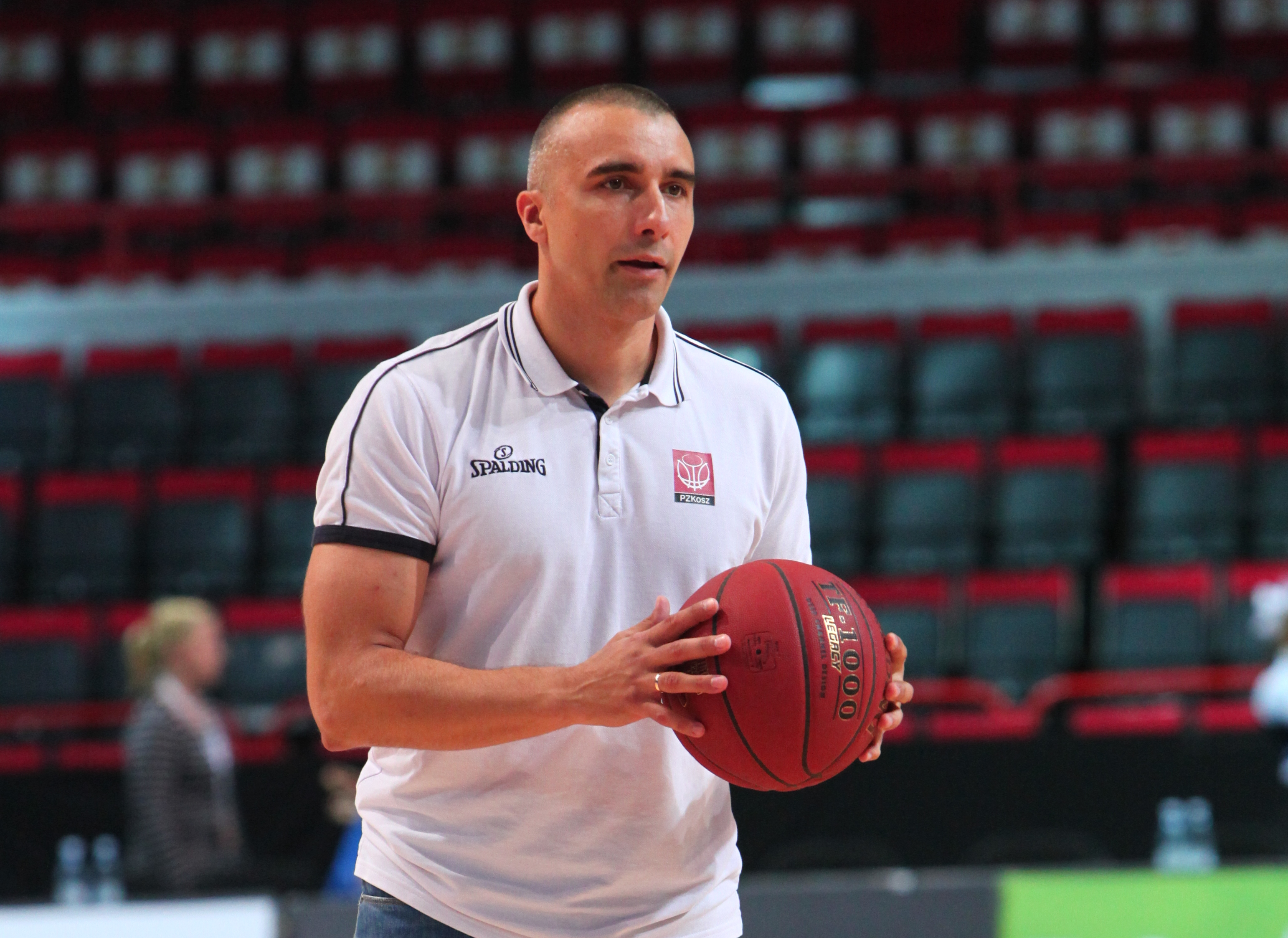
Andrzej Pluta

The game tipped off at 6:21 PM. Andrzej Pluta scored the first points, followed by an alley-oop to Harding Nana. Cameron Bennerman answered with a three-pointer, and Jakub Dłoniak and Walter Hodge added two points each. At 12–8 for the South, a timeout was called, pre-arranged for a cheerleader performance from Wrocław. The North narrowed the gap with three-pointers from Michael Hicks and Bennerman, taking a 19–16 lead after a dunk by Bryan Davis and another Hicks three-pointer. Both teams played minimal defense, leading to a high-scoring, entertaining quarter. Nana scored 13 points, but the North led 29–27.

===== Second quarter =====
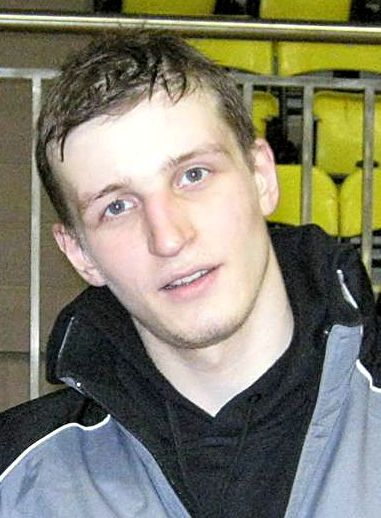
Adam Waczyński

The second quarter opened with coordinated plays by Adam Waczyński and Filip Dylewicz, with Waczyński scoring six points in the first two minutes. Dunks by Daniel Ewing, Ted Scott, and Tony Easley extended the North's lead to 10 points after five minutes. A highlight came when Bennerman dunked backward after a lob from Hicks. The South responded with three-pointers from Pluta and Marko Brkić and a fast-break score, cutting the lead to four points. The North maintained their advantage, leading 63–55 at halftime.

===== Third quarter =====
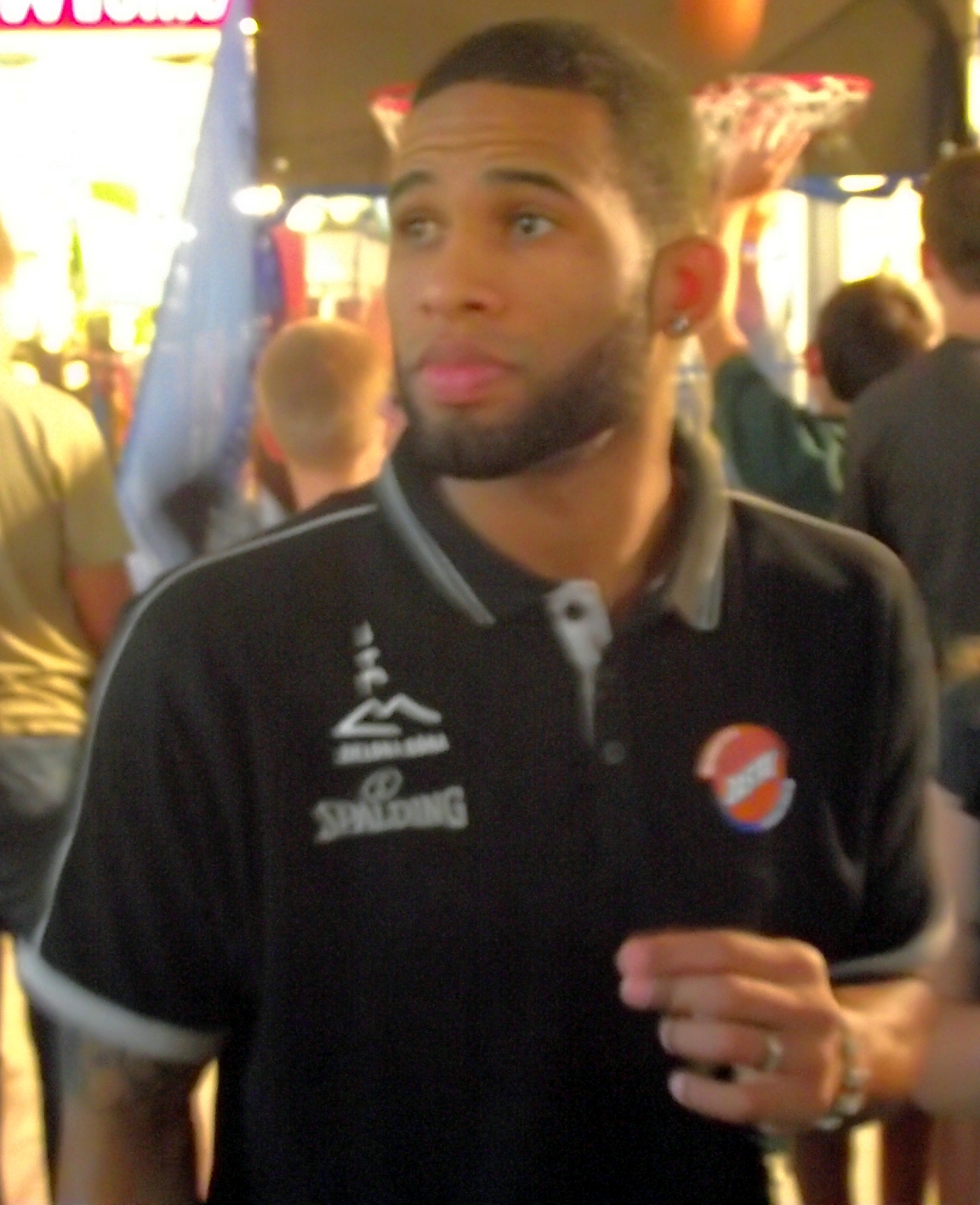
Walter Hodge

The third quarter began with another Bennerman dunk. The North extended their lead to 70–57, but the South mounted a comeback. Four consecutive three-pointers, a block by Nana, and a fast-break score by Hodge reduced the North's lead to one point. After a timeout, Hodge's fast-break score gave the South a 1-point lead. Strong play from Hodge and Nana helped the South lead 90–88 entering the fourth quarter.

===== Fourth quarter =====
Both teams played more aggressive defense in the fourth quarter, resulting in frequent lead changes. A Bennerman dunk tied the game at 110 with 90 seconds remaining. Chris Burgess then scored five straight points, giving the South a 115–110 lead. Two plays by Energa Czarni Słupsk players cut the lead to one point. With 13 seconds left, Darnell Hinson was fouled on a made shot but missed the free throw; Nana secured the rebound and was fouled. His two free throws gave the South a 119–114 lead. Bennerman hit a buzzer beater three-pointer, but the South won 119–117. Harding Nana was named MVP.

== Sponsors ==
The event was sponsored by the city of Kalisz, Tauron Polska Energia, Multimedia Polska, Echo Investment, and Winiary. The three-point shootout was sponsored by Spalding, and the slam dunk contest by Tissot.
