= Polish Basketball All-Star Game =

Polish All-Star Game
- Status: Inactive
- Inaugurated: 1994
- Most recent: 2013
- Organizer: Polish Basketball Federation; PLK

The Polish All-Star Game is the All-Star Game of the professional Polish Basketball League (LKL). The game is held once every year. It was first organized by the Polish Basketball Federation and then by PLK, after 1995.

Many legendary players like Adam Wojcik and Joe McNaull have featured in the eventwhich first started in the 1993–94 season.

== History ==
The event started in the 1993-94 season by the LKL featuring a match between North and South selection and also contests. In 1995 the Polish Basketball League took over.

The last edition with a game between selections was in the 2011–12 season. Ever since the All-Star Game showcases only the contests which occasionally include guest players from other leagues.

The 2013 edition featured a game between the PKL All-Stars against the Czech league All-Stars.

== Results ==
Summaries
Year	City	Result			|MVP
Year	City	Champion	Score	Runner-up	|MVP
1994	Stalowa Wola	South	138–136	North	(Poland) Jaroslaw Zyskowski
1995	Tarnów	North	168–165	South	(Poland) Igor Griszczuk
1996	Poznań	North	181–133	South	(United States) Tyrice Walker
1997		North	160–142	South	(United States) (Poland) Joe McNaull
1998	Tarnów	North	141–126	South	(United States) (Spain) Gary Alexander
1999		West	125–90	East	(Poland) Adam Wojcik
2000		West	86–84	East	(United States) Antoine Joubert
2001-2002			not held		
2003	Bydgoszcz	South	92–86	North	(United States) Joe McNaull
2003-2004			not held		
2005	Bydgoszcz	South	118–115	North	(Lithuania) Gintaras Kadziulis
2006		North	97–84	South	(United States) Chudney Gray
2007	Wrocław	South	87–77	North	(United States) Grady Reynolds
2008		South	114–112	North	(Poland) Andrzej Pluta
2009		North	143–116	South	(Poland) Adam Wojcik (2)
2010		South	108–92	North	(United States) (Turkey) Michael Wright
2011		South	119–117	North	(Cameroon) Harding NaNa
2012		North	151–135	South	(United States) Corsley Edwards
2013		TBL (Poland)	109–104	NBL (Czech)	(Puerto Rico) Walter Hodge

== Score sheets (1994–2012) ==
data source:

- 1st All-Star Game 1993-94:

DATE:
SCORE: South - North 138-136

South: Adam Wojcik 31, Dominik Tomczyk 17, Robert Kosciuk 10, Keith Williams 3, Mariusz Bacik 3, Jaroslaw Zyskowski 36, Piotr Karolak 19, Roman Rutkowski 15, Roman Prawica 4, Mariusz Sobacki, Andrzej Adamek, Piotr Czaska

North: Tomasz Jankowski 19, Roman Olszewski 22, Chris Elzey 16, Wojciech Krolik 10, Marek Sobczynski 10, Aleksiej Ugriumow 21, Jerzy Binkowski 14, Igor Griszczuk 12, Gintaras Baczanskas 6, Jaroslaw Dubicki 4, Jaroslaw Marcinkowski 2, Gvidonas Markevicius 2

- 2nd All-Star Game 1994-95:

DATE:
SCORE: North - South 168-165

South: Mariusz Bacik 29, Nathan Buntin 20, Wojciech Krolik 17, Daryl Thomas 10, Andrzej Adamek 4, Dominik Tomczyk 25, Roman Prawica 22, Tomasz Grzechowiak 13, Adam Golab 12, Piotr Karolak 6, Daniel Puchalski 4, Roman Rutkowski 3

North: Adam Wojcik 22, Igor Griszczuk 21, Tyrice Walker 20, Keith Williams 15, Tomasz Jankowski 14, Ronnie Battle 20, Tyrone Thomas 20, Dariusz Kondraciuk 17, Roman Olszewski 14, Piotr Wiktorowski 4, Martin Eggleston 1, Marek Sobczynski 0.

- 3d All-Star Game 1995-96:

DATE:
SCORE: North - South 181-133

North: Tyrice Walker 36, Igor Griszczuk 18, Tomasz Jankowski 9, Keith Williams 8, Ronnie Battle 7, Martin Eggleston 24, Ricky Robinson 21, Jamal Faulkner 20, Keith Hughes 20, Robert Kosciuk 8, Krzysztof Dryja 6, Ikie Corbin 4.

South: Mariusz Bacik 20, Piotr Karolak 9, Henryk Wardach 6, Joe Daughrity 7, Pawel Szczesniak 5, Roman Rutkowski 22, Tyrone Thomas 22, Ben Seltzer 17, Mariusz Sobacki 11, Andrzej Adamek 7, Andrzej Pluta 6, Nathan Buntin 1, Krzysztof Mila

- 4th All-Star Game 1996-97:

DATE:
SCORE: North - South 160-142

North: Ricky Calloway 26, Igor Griszczuk 20, Tomasz Jankowski 13, Tyrone Thomas 7, Martin Eggleston 6, Dannie Norris 28, Joe McNaull 27, Ricky Robinson 16, Robert Kosciuk 10, Keith Williams 3, Adrian Malecki 2, Przemyslaw Frasunkiewicz 2.

South: Maciej Zielinski 20, Tyrice Walker 19, Andrzej Pluta 15, Dominik Tomczyk 12, Antoine Joubert 11, Jeff Massey 21, Krzysztof Dryja 13, Piotr Szybilski 13, Mariusz Bacik 9, Piotr Karolak 7, Andrzej Adamek 2, James Winters, Wojciech Kukuczka

- 5th All-Star Game 1997-98:

DATE:
SCORE: North - South 141-126

North: Gary Alexander 25, Piotr Szybilski 23, Tyrice Walker 19, Dominik Tomczyk 15, Michal Hlebowicki 13, Kelvin Upshaw 15, LaBradford Smith 12, Krzysztof Sidor 11, Krzysztof Dryja 4, Robert Kosciuk 4.

South: Samuel Hines 29, Andrzej Pluta 17, Ronnie Thompkins 17, Tyrone Barksdale 12, Adam Wojcik 2, Adrian Malecki 16, Tomasz Jankowski 15, Duane Cooper 7, Will Brantley 5, Mariusz Bacik 4, Dominik Derwisz 2

- 6th All-Star Game 1998-99:

DATE:
SCORE: West - East 125-90

West : Maciej Zielinski 24, Adam Wojcik 19, Tomasz Jankowski 12, Joe McNaull 9, Raimonds Miglinieks 2, Roberts Stelmahers 19, Chris Sneed 16, Igor Griszczuk 12, Pawel Wiekiera 7, Walter Jeklin 5, Alan Gregov

East : Ainars Bagatskis 21, Antoine Joubert 10, Andrzej Pluta 8, Adrian Malecki 6, Dominik Tomczyk 2, Yohance Nicholas 15, Kenny Williams 13, Phil Zevenbergen 8, Isaiah Morris 5, Tyrone Barksdale 2, Mariusz Bacik

- 7th All-Star Game 1999-00:

DATE:
SCORE: West - East 86-84

West : Antoine Joubert 23, Isaiah Morris 20, Tomasz Jankowski 10, Kordian Korytek 10, Andrzej Pluta 8, Michal Hlebowicki 6, Tyrice Walker 2, Edgars Sneps 2, Radoslaw Hyzy 2, Raimonds Miglinieks 1

East : Adam Wojcik 16, Jerry Hester 15, Maciej Zielinski 14, Charles O'Bannon 14, Rafal Bigus 10, John Taylor 6, Krzysztof Wilangowski 4, Jarrod Gee 3, Alan Gregov 3, Zoran Sretenovic 1

- 8th All-Star Game 2002-03:

DATE:
SCORE: South - North 92-86

South: Dainius Adomaitis 24, Eric Elliott 15, Maciej Zielinski 13, Eric Taylor 9, Andrius Giedraitis 8, Brant Bailey 7, Aleksander Kul 6, Konstantin Furman 4, Chris Heinrich 2, Brandun Hughes 2, Wojciech Szawarski 2, Milos Sporar

North: Joe McNaull 20, Tomas Pacesas 12, Alex Austin 12, Goran Jagodnik 11, Andrzej Pluta 9, Jiri Zidek 6, Josip Vrankovic 6, Przemyslaw Frasunkiewicz 5, Zbigniew Bialek 4, Shawn Respert 1, Jaroslaw Kalinowski

- 9th All-Star Game 2004-05:

DATE:
SCORE: South - North 118-115

South: Michael Watson 19, Radoslaw Hyzy 19, Gintaras Kadziulis 14, Brandon Brown 12, Mujo Tuljkovic 11, Michael Ansley 11, Ryan Randle 9, Robert Witka 7, Robert Skibniewski 6, Deana Nolan 5, Dominik Czubek 3, Shannon Johnson 2, Adrian Penland

North: John Thomas 29, Goran Jagodnik 12, Eric Taylor 12, Adam Wojcik 10, Rafal Frank 8, Tomas Pacesas 7, Eric Elliott 7, Otis Hill 6, Pawel Wiekiera 6, Istvan Nemeth 5, Wojciech Majchrzak 4, Tomas Masiulis 4, Malgorzata Dydek 4, Beata Krupska-Tyszkiewicz 2

- 10th All-Star Game 2005-06:

DATE:
SCORE: North - South 97-84

North: Steffon Bradford 18, Chudney Gray 17, Adam Wojcik 16, Christian Dalmau 14, Dennis Stanton 9, Alex Dunn 5, Blake Hamilton 4, Damien Kinloch 4, Greg Davis 3, Miah Davis 3, Goran Jagodnik 2, Tarmo Kikerpill 2

South: George Reese 14, Dante Swanson 11, Michal Ignerski 10, Radoslaw Hyzy 10, Steve Thomas 10, Andrzej Pluta 9, Kevin Fletcher 8, Lukasz Koszarek 6, Wojciech Zurawski 4, Ed Scott, Eric Taylor 2

- 11th All-Star Game 2006-07:

DATE:
SCORE: South - North 87-77

South: Andrzej Pluta 11, Robert Witka 11, Goran Jagodnik 7, Radoslaw Hyzy 4, Dean Oliver 2, Grady Reynolds 16, Thomas Kelati 13, Tony Akins 7, Wojciech Szawarski 7, Dominik Tomczyk 6, Michael Ansley 3, Lukasz Koszarek

North: Harding Nana 19, Aaron Pettway 16, Dawid Witos 6, Robert Skibniewski 3, Rafal Bigus 2, Rashid Atkins 12, Miah Davis 6, Przemyslaw Frasunkiewicz 5, David Logan 4, Iwo Kitzinger 2, Gintaras Kadziulis 2

- 12th All-Star Game 2007-08:

DATE:
SCORE: South - North 114-112

South: Andrzej Pluta 21, Jared Homan 19, Norman Richardson 16, Alan Daniels 14, David Logan 10, Kris Clarkson 9, Kamil Chanas 8, Alex Dunn 6, Rashid Atkins 4, Thomas Kelati 3, Andres Rodriguez 2, Lukasz Koszarek 2, Wojciech Szawarski

North: D.J. Thompson 18, Donald Copeland 15, Eric Hicks 15, Michael Ansley 13, Hernol Hall 10, Pawel Kikowski 10, Christian Burns 10, Chris Daniels 10, Krzysztof Roszyk 4, Przemyslaw Frasunkiewicz 3, Filip Dylewicz 2, Milan Gurovic 2, Donatas Slanina

- 13d All-Star Game 2008-09:

DATE:
SCORE: North - South 143-116

North: Michael Hicks 24, Adam Wojcik 22, Pawel Kikowski 15, David Logan 14, Filip Dylewicz, Brandon Wallace 14, Sefton Barrett 14, Kevin Hamilton 12, George Reese 12, Alex McLean 7, Pawel Leonczyk 6, Javier Mojica 3

South: Andrzej Pluta 12, Chris Daniels 8, Marko Brkic 3, Lukasz Koszarek 2, Michael Ansley 2, Eddie Miller 25, Chad Timberlake 22, Quinton Day 14, Adam Waczynski 12, Kyle Landry 6, Krzysztof Roszyk 4, Krzysztof Szubarga 4, Robert Witka 2

- 14th All-Star Game 2009-10:

DATE:
SCORE: South - North 108-92

South: Harding Nana 10, Mujo Tuljkovic 8, Marek Miszczuk 7, Adam Waczynski 5, Krzysztof Szubarga, Michael Wright 30, Eddie Miller 15, Jeremy Chappell 12, Andrzej Pluta 11, Dardan Berisha 7, Keddrick Mays 3, Nikola Jovanovic

North: Tomasz Kesicki 13, Dante Swanson 9, Piotr Stelmach 9, Mantas Cesnauskis 7, George Reese 4, Lawrence Kinnard 14, Iwo Kitzinger 14, Quinton Day 10, Patrick Okafor 7, Tony Weeden 7, Saulius Kuzminskas, Darrell Harris

- 15th All-Star Game 2010-11:

DATE:
SCORE: South - North 119-117

South: Cameron Bennerman 22, Bryan Davis 19, Ratko Varda 19, Daniel Ewing 13, Ted Scott 8, Michael Hicks 8, Adam Waczynski 8, Filip Dylewicz 7, Zbigniew Bialek 6, Igor Milicic 5, Slavisa Bogavac 3

North: Harding Nana 26, Walter Hodge 12, Tony Easley 12, Andrzej Pluta 11, Darnell Hinson 11, Eddie Miller 10, Chris Burgess 9, Nikola Jovanovic 8, Ivan Koljevic 7, Jakub Dloniak 7, Torey Thomas 3, Marko Brkic 3

- 16th All-Star Game 2011-12:

DATE:
SCORE: North - South 151-135

North: Corsley Edwards 23, Dardan Berisha 18, Krzysztof Szubarga 18, Tony Weeden 15, John Turek 14, Darrell Harris 14, Lukasz Wisniewski 12, George Reese 12, Darnell Hinson 7, Filip Dylewicz 6, Lukasz Koszarek 6, Pawel Leonczyk 6

South: Konrad Wysocki 20, Daniel Kickert 19, Mateusz Ponitka 13, Walter Hodge 13, Przemyslaw Karnowski 11, Robert Skibniewski 11, Kirk Archibeque 10, Kamil Chanas 10, Jose Miller 8, Piotr Pamula 8, Qa'rraan Calhoun 6, Damian Kulig 6

== Three-Point Shoot Contest ==
Year	Player	Team
1994	(Belarus) (Poland) Igor Griszczuk	Pruszków
1995	(Poland) Wojciech Krolik	Polonia Warsaw
1996	(Poland) Wojciech Krolik	Polonia Warsaw
1997	(Poland) Andrzej Adamek	Polonia Warsaw
1998	(Poland) Adrian Malecki	Unia Tarnów
1999	(Latvia) Ainars Bagatskis	MKKS Zabrze
2000	(Poland) Andrzej Pluta	Ruda Śląska
2001-2002	not held	Ruda Śląska
2003	(Poland) Andrzej Pluta	Anwil Włocławek
2005	(Lithuania) Gintaras Kadziulis	Anwil Włocławek
2006	(Poland) Andrzej Pluta	PGE Turów
2007	(Poland) Iwo Kitzinger	Unia Tarnów
2008	(Poland) Andrzej Pluta	Anwil Włocławek
2009	(Poland) Andrzej Pluta	Anwil Włocławek
2010	(Poland) Andrzej Pluta	Anwil Włocławek
2011	(United States) (Puerto Rico) Darnell Hinson	(Puerto Rico) Guayama
2012	(Poland) Andrzej Pluta	Anwil Włocławek
2013	(Poland) Przemyslaw Zamojski	Trefl Sopot
2014	(United States) Tre Simmons	(United States) 3Headed Monsters
2016-2017	not held	
2018		
2019	(Poland) Michal Chylinski	Anwil Włocławek
2020	(United States) (Poland) Michael Hicks	Pelplin
2021	(Latvia) Martins Laksa	PGE Start
2022	(United States) (Poland) Luke Petrasek	Anwil Włocławek
2023	(Poland) Jakub Niziol	Bydgoszcz
2024	(Poland) Dominik Wilczek	Arka

== Slam-Dunk champions ==
Year	Player	Team
1994	(Poland) Adam Wojcik	ASPRO Wrocław
1995	(Poland) Adam Wojcik	Pruszków
1996	(United States) (France) Antwon Hoard	Pruszków
1997	(United States) Jeff Massey	Pruszków
1998	(Poland) Adrian Malecki	Unia Tarnów
1999	(United States) Tyrone Barksdale	Sosnowiec
2000		
2001-2002	not held	
2003	(United States) Brant Bailey	Pruszków
2004	(Poland) Michal Ignerski	Śląsk Wrocław
2005	(Poland) Michal Krajewski	Stal
2006	(Lithuania) Aivaras Kiausas	Śląsk Wrocław
2007	(United States) Grady Reynolds	Polonia Warsaw
2008	(Lithuania) Aivaras Kiausas	Śląsk Wrocław
2009	(Canada) Sefton Barrett	Kołobrzeg
2010	(United States) Eddie Miller	ISS Sportino
2011	(Poland) Lukasz Biedny	Poland National Team
2012	(United States) Qarraan Calhoun	Śląsk Wrocław
2013	(United States) Michael Deloach	(Romania) Dinamo Bucuresti
2014	(Zaire) Christian Eyenga	Zastal
2016-2017	not held	
2018	(United States) (Jamaica) Ryan Harrow	Radom
2019	(United Kingdom) Morayo Soluade	Legia Warsaw
2020	(United States) Thomas Davis	Starogard Gdynia
2021	(Poland) Jan Wojcik	Śląsk Wrocław 2
2022	(United States) James Eads III	Arriva P.Cukier
2023	(United States) Phil Fayne II	King Szczecin
2024	(United States) Xeyrius Williams	(Portugal) FC Porto

== Topscorers ==
Winners
Year	Player	
Year	Player	Team
1994	(Poland) Jaroslaw Zyskowski (36 pts)	
1995	(Poland) Mariusz Bacik (29 pts)	
1996	(United States) Tyrice Walker (36 pts)	
1997	(United States) (Poland) Joe McNaull (27 pts)	
1998	(United States) Samuel Hines (29 pts)	
1999	(Poland) Maciej Zielinski (29 pts)	
2000	(United States) Antoine Joubert (23 pts)	Pogoń Ruda Śląska
2001-2002	not held	
2003	(Lithuania) Dainius Adomaitis (24 pts)	Śląsk Wrocław
2003-2004	not held	
2005	(United States) John Thomas (29 pts)	
2006	(United States) Steffon Bradford (18 pts)	AZS Koszalin
2007	(Cameroon) Harding Nana (19 pts)	
2008	(Poland) Andrzej Pluta (21 pts)	Anwil Włocławek
2009	(United States) (Poland) Michael Hicks (24 pts)	Polpharma Starogard Gdański
2010	(United States) (Turkey) Michael Wright (30 pts)	Turów Zgorzelec
2011	(Cameroon) Harding NaNa (26 pts)	Polonia Warszawa
2012	(United States) Corsley Edwards (23 pts)	Anwil Włocławek
2013	(United States) Michael Deloach (NBL) (27 pts)	Tuři Svitavy (NBL)

== Players with most appearances ==
Player	All-Star	Editions	DOB	Notes
(Poland) Andrzej Pluta	12	1996, 1997, 1998, 1999, 2000, 2003, 2006, 2007, 2008, 2009, 2010, 2011	1974	7x Three-Point Shoot Contest
(Poland) Adam Wojcik	7	1994, 1995, 1998, 1999, 2000, 2005, 2006	1970	2x Slam-Dunk champion, 2x MVP
(Poland) Tomasz Jankowski	7	1994-2000	1972	
(Poland) Dominik Tomczyk	6	1994, 1995, 1997, 1998, 1999, 2007	1974	
(Belarus) (Poland) Igor Griszczuk	5	1994, 1995, 1996, 1997, 1999	1972	1x Three-Point Shoot Contest, 1x MVP
(United States) Tyrice Walker	5	1994, 1995, 1996, 1997, 1998, 2000	1972	1x MVP

== See also ==
- Polish Basketball League

== Sources ==
- All-Star Game results 1994-2013
