= Eurocup Basketball 2010–11 Regular Season Group H =

Standings and results for Group H of the regular season phase of the 2010–11 Eurocup basketball tournament.

== Standings ==
Key to colors
Top two places in each group advance to Last 16

	Team	Pld	W	L	PF	PA	Diff
1.	(Germany) Alba Berlin	6	6	0	496	414	+82
2.	(Italy) Pepsi Caserta	6	3	3	472	463	+9
3.	(Russia) Krasnye Krylya	6	2	4	478	502	−24
4.	(Poland) Anwil Włocławek	6	1	5	470	537	−67

Source: Euroleague Basketball

== Fixtures and results ==
All times given below are in Central European Time.

=== Game 1 ===
16 November 2010
17:00

Report

Krasnye Krylya (Russia)	78–85	(Italy) Pepsi Caserta
Scoring by quarter: 24–20, 22–17, 13–23, 19–24
Pts: Brezec 24; Rebs: Brezec 7 Asts: Rush 5		Pts: Di Bella 25; Rebs: Eric Williams 8 Asts: Bowers 7

MTL Arena
Attendance: 3,000
Referees: Murat Biricik (TUR), Zdravko Rutesic (MNE), Haris Bijedic (BIH)

16 November 2010
19:00

Report

Anwil Włocławek (Poland)	74–86	(Germany) Alba Berlin
Scoring by quarter: 26–22, 18–17, 14–31, 16–16
Pts: Jovanović 20; Rebs: Majewski 4 Asts: Thomas 6		Pts: McElroy 20; Rebs: Allen 10; Asts: Jenkins 6

Hala Mistrzów
Attendance: 3,000
Referees: Vicente Bulto (ESP), Oskars Lucis (LAT), Alfred Jovovic (CRO)

=== Game 2 ===
23 November 2010
20:30

Report

Pepsi Caserta (Italy)	87–79	(Poland) Anwil Włocławek
Scoring by quarter: 18–24, 21–20, 25–17, 23–18
Pts: Jones 20; Rebs: Bowers, Doornekamp 6 Asts: Di Bella 4		Pts: Thomas 18; Rebs: Miller 13; Asts: Thomas 3

PalaMaggiò
Attendance: 1,456
Referees: Spiros Gkontas (GRE), Roman Kolar (SLO), Aleksandar Milojevik (MKD)

24 November 2010
20:00

Report

Alba Berlin (Germany)	88–64	(Russia) Krasnye Krylya
Scoring by quarter: 23–16, 23–13, 19–12, 23–23
Pts: Allen 19; Rebs: Dragićević 7 Asts: Marinović 6		Pts: Rush 18; Rebs: Nesterov 7 Asts: Bremer 11

O2 World
Attendance: 8,863
Referees: Jakub Zamojski (POL), Milija Vojinovic (SRB), Igor Dragojevic (MNE)

=== Game 3 ===
30 November 2010
17:00

Report

Krasnye Krylya (Russia)	103–80	(Poland) Anwil Włocławek
Scoring by quarter: 25–21, 27–21, 21–21, 30–17
Pts: Rush, Green 21; Rebs: Green 10; Asts: Bremer 10		Pts: Hicks 16; Rebs: Thomas 7 Asts: Thomas 3

MTL Arena
Attendance: 3,500
Referees: Marius Ciulin (ROU), Andrej Jersan (SLO), Nikola Lepetic (MNE)

30 November 2010
20:30

Report

Pepsi Caserta (Italy)	73–79	(Germany) Alba Berlin
Scoring by quarter: 21–27, 16–13, 21–23, 15–16
Pts: Williams 14; Rebs: Garri 6 Asts: Bowers, Jones 2		Pts: Dragićević 16; Rebs: Marinović, Dragićević 9 Asts: Jenkins, McElroy 2

PalaMaggiò
Attendance: 1,618
Referees: Dubravko Muhvic (CRO), Renaud Geller (BEL), Jurgis Laurinavicius (LTU)

=== Game 4 ===
7 December 2010
19:00

Report

Anwil Włocławek (Poland)	83–98	(Russia) Krasnye Krylya
Scoring by quarter: 19–26, 17–9, 25–28, 22–35
Pts: Miller 19; Rebs: Modrić 7 Asts: Thomas 7		Pts: Brezec 25; Rebs: Brezec 12; Asts: Anisimov 7

Hala Mistrzów
Attendance: 1,560
Referees: Sasa Maricic (SRB), Oscar Lefwerth (SWE), Petri Mantyla (FIN)

7 December 2010
20:00

Report

Alba Berlin (Germany)	79–62	(Italy) Pepsi Caserta
Scoring by quarter: 20–14, 30–14, 10–17, 19–17
Pts: Jenkins, Marinović 14; Rebs: three players 5 Asts: Jenkins, Marinović 4		Pts: Di Bella 16; Rebs: Jones 10; Asts: Di Bella 4

O2 World
Attendance: 8,854
Referees: Zoran Sutulovic (MNE), Seffi Shemmesh (ISR), Elias Koromilas (GRE)

=== Game 5 ===
14 December 2010
20:00

Report

Alba Berlin (Germany)	92–73	(Poland) Anwil Włocławek
Scoring by quarter: 25–16, 30–17, 15–16, 22–24
Pts: Idbihi 15; Rebs: Allen, Taylor 5 Asts: Staiger 5		Pts: Pluta 13; Rebs: three players 5 Asts: Thomas 6

O2 World
Attendance: 7,114
Referees: Apostolos Kalpakas (SWE), Petar Obradovic (BIH), Sergiy Zashchuck (UKR)

30 November 2010
20:30

Report

Pepsi Caserta (Italy)	94–67	(Russia) Krasnye Krylya
Scoring by quarter: 22–15, 28–14, 21–19, 23–19
Pts: Ere 32; Rebs: Doornekamp 6 Asts: Bowers, Jones 3		Pts: Brezec 21; Rebs: Brezec 8 Asts: Green 2

PalaMaggiò
Attendance: 1,483
Referees: Jose Ramon Garcia Ortiz (ESP), Francisco Araña (ESP), Omer Esteron (ISR)

=== Game 6 ===
21 December 2010
19:45

Report

Krasnye Krylya (Russia)	68–72	(Germany) Alba Berlin
Scoring by quarter: 21–17, 16–21, 17–20, 14–14
Pts: Brezec 23; Rebs: Brezec 17; Asts: Rush 6		Pts: Taylor 22; Rebs: Schultze 8 Asts: Marinović, Taylor 3

MTL Arena
Attendance: 1,500
Referees: Christos Christodoulou (GRE), Marko Juras (SRB), Miroslav Tomov (BUL)

21 December 2010
19:45

Report

Anwil Włocławek (Poland)	81–71	(Italy) Pepsi Caserta
Scoring by quarter: 17–16, 16–19, 24–17, 24–19
Pts: Miller 17; Rebs: Jovanović 7 Asts: Thomas 7		Pts: Bowers 22; Rebs: Bowers 9 Asts: Bowers 6

Hala Mistrzów
Attendance: 2,000
Referees: Volodymr Drabikovsky (UKR), Rustu Nuran (TUR), Arnis Ozols (LAT)
