= 2010–11 PLK season =

Tauron Basket Liga ^{1}
- Duration: October 6, 2010 – May 23, 2011
- Teams: 12

Regular season
- Top seed: Asseco Prokom Gdynia
- Season MVP: (United States) Torey Thomas

Finals
- Champions: Asseco Prokom Gdynia
- Runners-up: PGE Turów Zgorzelec
- Semi-finalists: Trefl Sopot; Energa Czarni Slupsk
- Finals MVP: (United States) Daniel Ewing

Statistical leaders
Points	(United States) Ted Scott	25.4
Rebounds	(United States) Darrell Harris	11.4
Assists	(Poland) Igor Miličić	6.6
- ^1 Sponsored league name, referring to Tauron.

The 2010–11 PLK season, for sponsorships reasons named the Tauron Basket Liga, was the 83rd edition of Poland's highest tier of professional basketball. Asseco Prokom Gdynia took the title, after it beat PGE Turów Zgorzelec 4–3 in the Finals.

== Regular season ==
Pos	Team	Pld	W	L	PF	PA	PD	GAvg	Pts	
1	Asseco Prokom Gdynia	22	17	5	1750	1575	+175	1.11	39	Qualified for Playoffs
2	PGE Turów Zgorzelec	22	15	7	1799	1680	+119	1.07	37	Qualified for Playoffs
3	Trefl Sopot	22	14	8	1708	1590	+118	1.07	36	Qualified for Playoffs
4	Energa Czarni Słupsk	22	14	8	1781	1716	+65	1.04	36	Qualified for Playoffs
5	Polpharma Starogard Gdański	22	11	11	1792	1753	+39	1.02	33	Qualified for Playoffs
6	Anwil Włocławek	22	11	11	1696	1632	+64	1.04	33	Qualified for Playoffs
7	PBG Basket Poznań	22	10	12	1678	1685	−7	1	32	Qualified for Playoffs
8	AZS Koszalin	22	10	12	1868	1942	−74	0.96	32	Qualified for Playoffs
9	Zastal Zielona Góra	22	9	13	1692	1754	−62	0.96	31	Qualified for Playout
10	Polonia Warszawa	22	9	13	1567	1663	−96	0.94	31	Qualified for Playout
11	Kotwica Kołobrzeg	22	8	14	1749	1806	−57	0.97	30	Qualified for Playout
12	Siarka Tarnobrzeg	22	4	18	1598	1882	−284	0.85	26	Qualified for Playout

== Playoffs ==
Quarterfinals
1	Asseco Prokom Gdynia	3
8	AZS Koszalin	1
5	Polpharma Starogard Gdański	1
4	Energa Czarni Słupsk	3
3	Trefl Sopot	3
6	Anwil Włocławek	1
7	PBG Basket Poznań	2
2	PGE Turów Zgorzelec	3

Semifinals
1	Asseco Prokom Gdynia	4
4	Energa Czarni Słupsk	1
3	Trefl Sopot	3
2	PGE Turów Zgorzelec	4

Finals
1	Asseco Prokom Gdynia	4
2	PGE Turów Zgorzelec	3

== Polish clubs in European competitions ==
Team	Competition	Progress
Asseco Prokom Gdynia	Euroleague	Regular season
Anwil Wloclawek	Eurocup	Regular season
Trefl Sopot	EuroChallenge	Qualifying round

== Polish clubs in regional competitions ==
Team	Competition	Progress
Asseco Prokom Gdynia	VTB United League	Regular season

== Awards and statistical leaders ==
- Season MVP: Torey Thomas (PGE Turów Zgorzelec)
- Finals MVP: Daniel Ewing (Asseco Prokom Gdynia)
- Top scorer: Ted Scott – 25.4 ppg
- Rebounds leader: Darrell Harris – 11.4 rpg
- Assists leader: Igor Miličić – 6.6 apg
