= Srđan Živković =

Serbian basketball player

Srdjan Živković
Personal information
- Born: 14 March 1986 (age 40) Beograd, SR Serbia, SFR Yugoslavia
- Listed height: 2.00 m (6 ft 7 in)
- Listed weight: 97 kg (214 lb)

Career information
- Playing career: 2001–2015
- Position: Small forward
- Number: 7, 30

Career history
- 2001–2003: Partizan
- 2004–2006: OKK Beograd
- 2006–2007: Ergonom
- 2008: MZT Skopje
- 2008: Napredak Kruševac
- 2008–2009: Mašinac
- 2009: Rilski Sportist
- 2009–2010: OKK Beograd
- 2011–2015: BBC Nyon

Career highlights
- 2× YUBA League champion (2002, 2003); Yugoslav Cup winner (2002)
Medals
Men's basketball
Representing FR Yugoslavia
European Championship for Cadets
Gold medal – first place	2001 Latvia	Team

Srđan Živković (Serbian Cyrillic: Срђан Живковић; born 14 March 1986) is a Serbian former professional basketball player.

== Professional career ==
Until 22 February 2019, Živković was the record-holder for being the youngest player to have appeared in a EuroLeague game. Živković made his debut for Partizan in an 86–77 win over Telindus Oostende in the opening game of the 2001–02 EuroLeague season. That was his first and last EuroLeague game. Živković parted ways with Partizan in 2003 and then continued his career in various non-EuroLeague Balkan clubs, OKK Beograd, Ergonom, MZT Skopje, Napredak Kruševac, Mašinac, and Rilski Sportist. He last played for Nyon in Switzerland before his retirement in 2015.

== National team career ==
In July 2001, Živković was a member of the Yugoslav Cadets that won a gold medal at the European Championship for Cadets in Riga, Latvia. He played only one game, recording only one rebound in an 86–55 win over the Italy.

In July 2004, Živković was a member of the Serbia and Montenegro under-18 team that participated at the FIBA Europe U18 Championship in Zaragoza, Spain. Over six tournament games, he averaged 5.7 points, 2.2 rebounds, and 0.8 assists per game. His team was ranked 5th at the Championship with a 5–3 record.

== See also ==
- List of youngest EuroLeague players
