= KK Mašinac =

Defunct basketball club in Kraljevo, Serbia

- Founded: 1982; 43 years ago
- Folded: 2013; 12 years ago
- History: KK Mašinac; 1982–2013
- Arena: Kraljevo Sports Hall
- Location: Kraljevo, Serbia
- Team colors: Cheery and White
- Championships: None
- Website: kkmasinac.rs
Home	Away

Košarkaški klub Mašinac (Serbian Cyrillic: Кошаркашки клуб Машинац, English: Mašinac Basketball Club), commonly referred to as KK Mašinac or simply Mašinac, was a men's professional basketball club based in Kraljevo, Serbia. The club used to compete in the Basketball League of Serbia B.

== Notable players ==
- (Serbia and Montenegro) Nikola Jovanović
- (Serbia and Montenegro) Bojan Kusmuk
- (Serbia and Montenegro) Milan Vučićević
- (Serbia and Montenegro) Oliver Stević
- (Serbia) Aleksandar Radulović
- (Serbia) Slobodan Božović
- (Serbia) Dušan Knežević
- (Serbia) Uroš Mirković
- (Serbia) Nemanja Jelesijević
- (Serbia) Edi Sinadinović
- (Serbia) Miljan Rakić
- (Serbia) Srđan Živković
- (Serbia) Marko Dimitrijević

== Head coaches ==
- (Serbia and Montenegro) Vladimir Androić
- (Serbia and Montenegro) Boško Đokić (2002–2003)
- (Serbia and Montenegro) Miloš Pejić (2005–2006)
- (Serbia) Vladimir Đokić (2009–2010)
