= Joe McNaull =

American basketball player (born 1972)

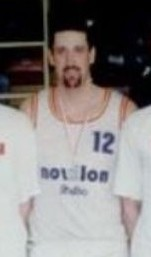

Personal information
- Born: June 23, 1972 (age 54) Miami, Florida
- Listed height: 6 ft 10 in (2.08 m)
- Listed weight: 260 lb (118 kg)

Career information
- High school: Monte Vista (Spring Valley, California)
- College: San Diego State (1990–1993); Long Beach State (1994–1995)
- NBA draft: 1995: undrafted
- Playing career: 1995–2011
- Position: Center
- Number: 12

Career history
- 1995–1996: Hermine de Nantes
- 1996–1997: Komfort Stargard Szczeciński
- 1997–2001: Śląsk Wrocław
- 2001–2003: Prokom Trefl Sopot
- 2003–2004: Ionikos Nea Filadelfia
- 2004–2005: Prokom Trefl Sopot
- 2005: Polpharma Starogard Gdański
- 2005–2006: Breogán Lugo
- 2006–2007: Plus Pujol Lleida
- 2007–2008: PBG Basket Poznań
- 2008–2011: Norrköping Dolphins

Career highlights
- 4× Polish League Champion (1998–2001); Swedish League Champion (2010); Polish League MVP (2003); Polish Basketball All-Star Game MVP (1997, 2003)

Joseph McNaull (born June 23, 1972) is an American former professional basketball player who also has Polish citizenship. Born in Miami, Florida, he is 6'10" and played at center. Represented Polish national basketball team for Eurobasket qualification. With Śląsk Wrocław he won four consecutive Polish league titles. With Norrköping Dolphins he won a Swedish league title in 2010.
