= Uroš Mirković (basketball) =

Serbian basketball player (born 1982)

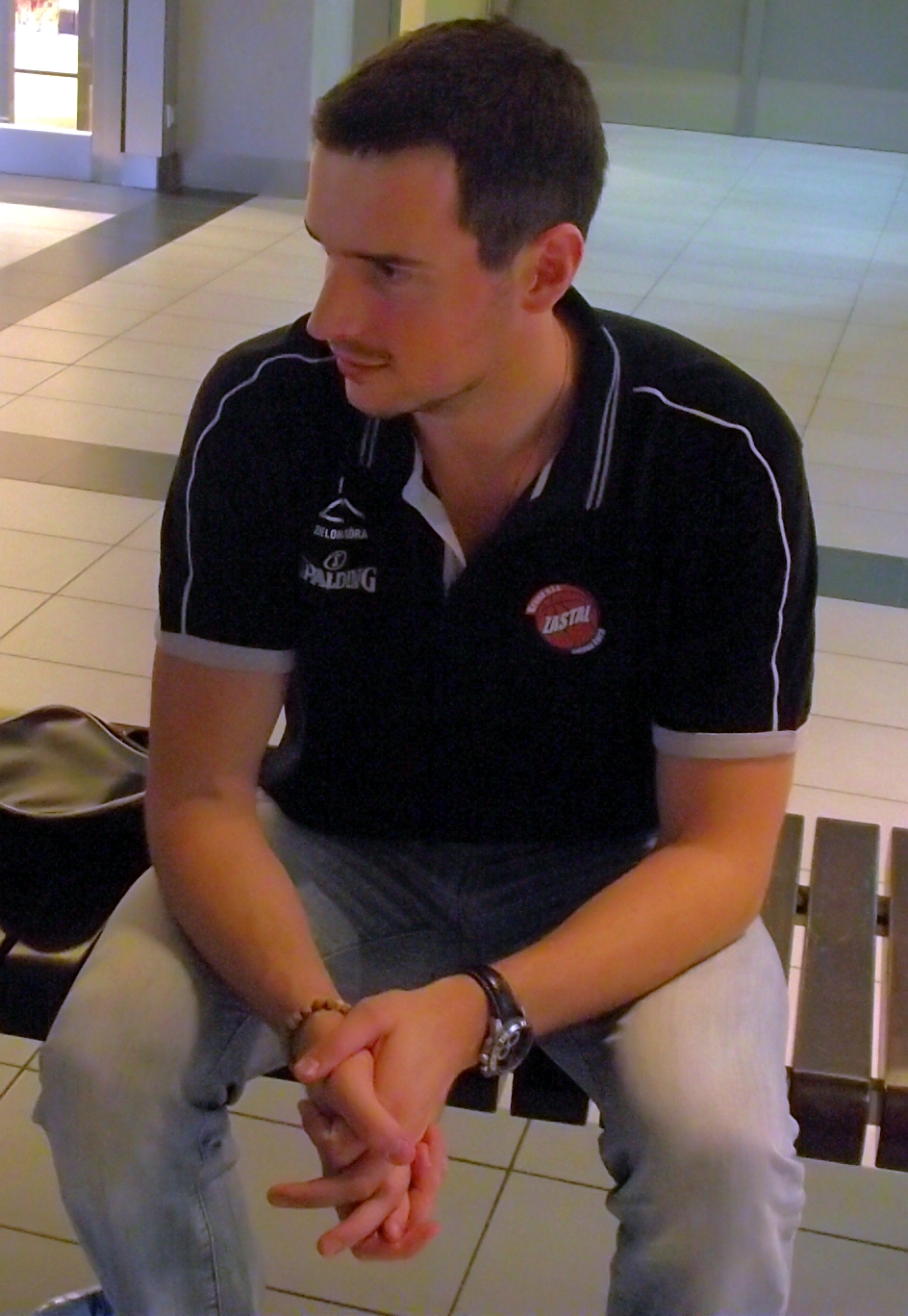

Proleter Naftagas
- Position: Power forward

Personal information
- Born: 11 January 1982 (age 44) Priština, SR Serbia, SFR Yugoslavia
- Listed height: 2.05 m (6 ft 9 in)
- Listed weight: 102 kg (225 lb)

Career information
- NBA draft: 2004: undrafted
- Playing career: 2000–present

Career history
- 2000–2008: Mašinac
- 2008: Vojvodina Srbijagas
- 2008–2009: Mašinac
- 2009: Swisslion Vršac
- 2009–2010: Polpharma Starogard
- 2010: Crvena zvezda
- 2010–2011: Polpharma Starogard
- 2011–2012: Zastal Zielona Góra
- 2012–2013: Polpharma Starogard
- 2013: Sloga
- 2013–2014: Igokea
- 2014–2015: Rosa Radom
- 2015–2017: Polpharma Starogard
- 2017–2019: TBV Start Lublin
- 2019–2021: Sloga
- 2021–present: Proleter Naftagas

Career highlights
- Bosnia-Herzegovina League champion (2014); Polish Cup winner (2011); Serbian First League MVP (2009)

Uroš Mirković (Serbian Cyrillic: Урош Мирковић; born 11 January 1982) is a Serbian professional basketball player for Proleter Naftagas of the Basketball League of Serbia.

== Professional career ==
Mirković made his professional debut with the Mašinac during the 2000–01 season. There he played till April 2008. He signed for the remainder of the 2007–08 season for Vojvodina Srbijagas. Mirković signed back for the 2008–09 season for Masinac. He got the Serbian First League MVP award. In April 2009, he signed for the remainder of the 2008–09 season for Swisslion Vršac.

Mirković moved to Poland for the 2009–10 season where he signed for Polpharma Starogard Gdański. Prior to the 2010–11 season he signed for the Serbian team Crvena zvezda. In November 2010, he moved back to the Polpharma Starogard Gdański.

Mirković played for Zastal Zielona Góra during the 2011–12 season, and for Polpharma Starogard Gdański during the 2012–13 season. In 2013, he briefly played for Serbian team Sloga. On 6 November 2013 he signed with Bosnian team Igokea.

On 6 July 2014 Mirković signed with Rosa Radom. On 25 November 2015 he signed with Polpharma Starogard Gdański for the fourth time. On 12 August 2017 he signed with TBV Start Lublin.
