= Dušan Knežević (basketball) =

Serbian basketball player

Podrinje Mitrovica
- Position: Center
- League: Second Basketball League of Serbia

Personal information
- Born: January 13, 1980 (age 46) Belgrade, SR Serbia, SFR Yugoslavia
- Listed height: 2.07 m (6 ft 9 in)
- Listed weight: 108 kg (238 lb)

Career information
- Playing career: 1997–2019

Career history
- 1997–1999: Srem
- 1999–2000: Zorka Šabac
- 2002: Nova Pazova
- 2002–2007: Mašinac
- 2007–2008: Saint-Quentin
- 2008–2009: Swisslion Takovo
- 2009–2013: Feni Industries
- 2013–2014: Rabotnički
- 2014–2017: Karpoš Sokoli
- 2017–2019: Tamiš
- 2019–2023: Drina Princip Zvornik
- 2023–present: Podrinje Mitrovica

Dušan Knežević (born January 13, 1980) is a Serbian professional basketball player.
