= Gino Cuccarolo =

Italian professional basketball player

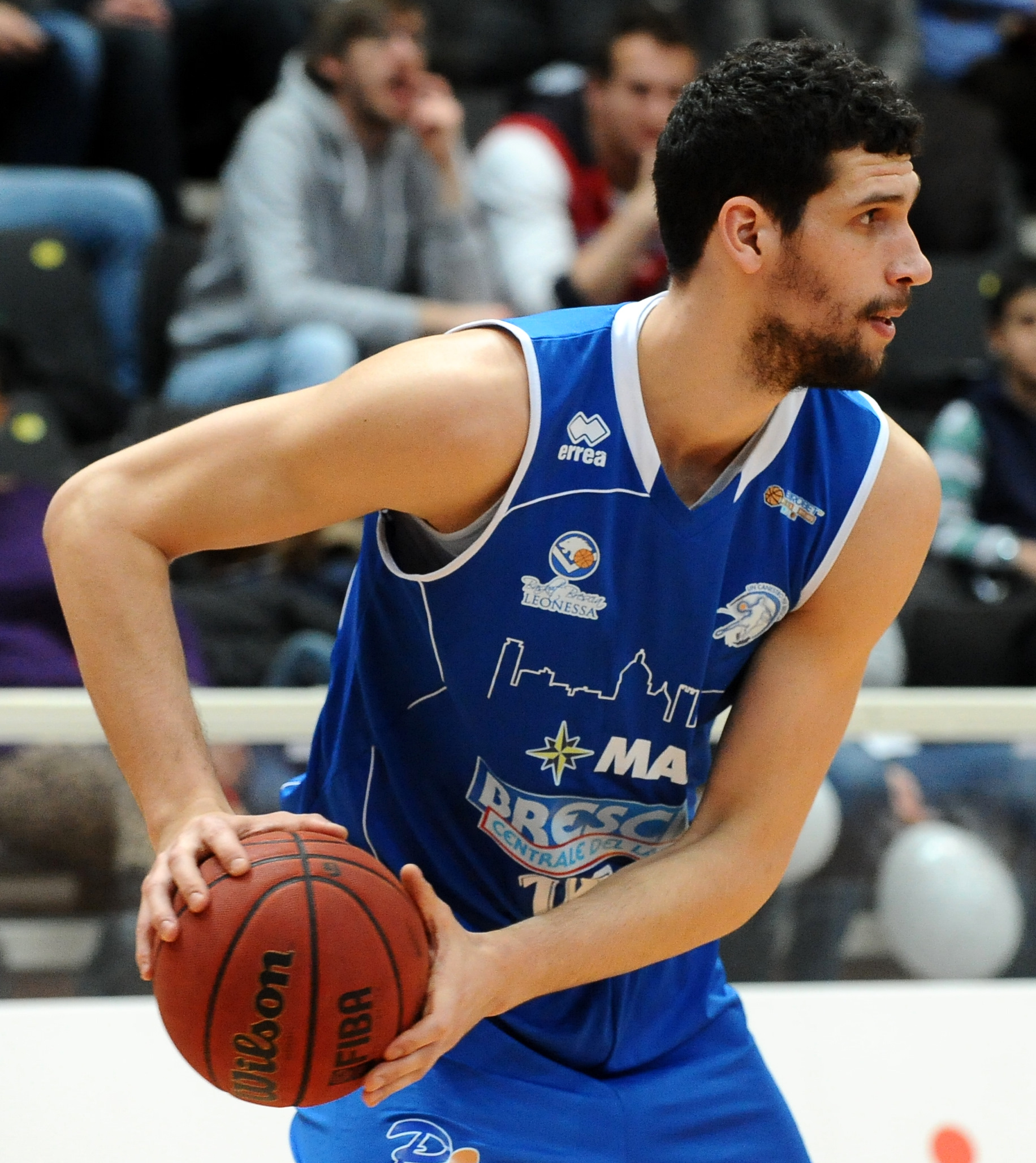
- Cuccarolo, as a player of Basket Brescia Leonessa, in 2013.

Personal information
- Born: November 26, 1987 (age 38) Asolo, Italy
- Listed height: 7 ft 3.5 in (2.22 m)
- Listed weight: 283 lb (128 kg)

Career information
- NBA draft: 2009: undrafted
- Playing career: 2003–2020
- Position: Center

Career history
- 2003–2012: Basket Treviso
- 2004–2005: → Basket Istrana
- 2005–2006: → Reyer Venezia
- 2007–2008: → RB Montecatini
- 2008–2010: → Virtus Siena
- 2011: → Biella
- 2012–2014: Leonessa BS
- 2014–2016: Virtus Bologna
- 2016–2017: Pallacanestro Udinese
- 2017: Auxilium Torino
- 2017-2018: Pallacanestro Gardonese
- 2018-2020: Fiorentina Basket

Career highlights
- Italian League champion (2006); Italian Supercup winner (2006); Italian Cup winner (2007)
Medals
Men's basketball
Representing Italy
FIBA Europe Under-20 Championship
Bronze medal – third place	2007 Slovenia & Italy
FIBA Europe Under-18 Championship
Bronze medal – third place	2005 Serbia and Montenegro	U-18 Team

Gino Cuccarolo (born November 26, 1987, in Asolo, Italy) is an Italian former professional basketball player. He is a 2.22 m (7 ft 3 1/2" in) tall center.

== Professional career ==
Cuccarolo began his professional career with the Italian League club Basket Treviso, during the Italian League 2003–04 season. He is the 4th youngest player to play in the EuroLeague, since the year 2000, starting in the Euroleague for the first time on his 16th birthday.

== Italian national team ==
Cuccarolo was a member of the junior national teams of Italy. With Italy's junior national teams, he played at the following tournaments: the 2003 FIBA Europe Under-16 Championship, the 2005 FIBA Europe Under-18 Championship, where he won a bronze medal, the 2006 FIBA Europe Under-20 Championship, and the 2007 FIBA Europe Under-20 Championship, where he won a bronze medal.

== See also ==
- List of tallest people
- List of youngest EuroLeague players
