= List of youngest EuroLeague players since the 2000–01 season =

This is a list of youngest EuroLeague players since the EuroLeague 2000–01 season, when the competition started to be organized by Euroleague Basketball. The EuroLeague is the European-wide top-tier level men's professional basketball club competition for eligible European basketball clubs. The list does not count any young players from the 1958 season to the 1999–00 season, when the EuroLeague competition was run by FIBA Europe.

== Key ==
Position	PG	SG	SF	PF	C
Position	Point guard	Shooting guard	Small forward	Power forward	Center

== Youngest players since the 2000–01 season ==
Rank	Player	Country	Position	Birth Date	First Game	Age	Team Played	Ref.
1	Fedor Žugić	Montenegro	PG	September 18, 2003	February 22, 2019	15 years, 157 days	(Montenegro) Budućnost VOLI	
2	Srđan Živković	(Serbia and Montenegro) Yugoslavia	PG	March 14, 1986	October 2, 2001	15 years, 202 days	(Serbia and Montenegro) Partizan	
3	Aleksandar Ugrinoski	(North Macedonia) Macedonia	PG	May 7, 1988	January 28, 2004	15 years, 266 days	(Croatia) Cibona VIP	
4	Neoklis Avdalas	Greece	PG	February 4, 2006	December 10, 2021	15 years, 309 days	(Greece) Panathinaikos	
5	Can Mutaf	Turkey	SG/SF	January 9, 1991	November 23, 2006	15 years, 318 days	(Turkey) Fenerbahçe Ülker	
6	Manu Markoishvili	Georgia	SG/SF	November 17, 1986	October 10, 2002	15 years, 327 days	(Italy) Benetton Treviso	
7	Gino Cuccarolo	Italy	C	November 26, 1987	November 26, 2003	16 years, 0 days	(Italy) Benetton Treviso	
8	Ricky Rubio	Spain	PG	October 21, 1990	October 24, 2006	16 years, 3 days	(Spain) DKV Joventut	
9	Uroš Tripković	Serbia and Montenegro	SG	September 11, 1986	October 9, 2002	16 years, 28 days	(Serbia and Montenegro) Partizan Mobtel	
10	Damir Markota	Croatia	PF	December 26, 1985	February 6, 2002	16 years, 42 days	(Croatia) Cibona VIP	
11	Vedran Pušić	Bosnia and Herzegovina	PF	December 22, 1986	February 12, 2003	16 years, 52 days	(Croatia) Cibona VIP	
12	Ioannis Karamalegkos	Greece	PG/SG	September 19, 1994	November 11, 2010	16 years, 53 days	(Greece) Panathinaikos Athens	
13	Džanan Musa	Bosnia and Herzegovina	SF	May 8, 1999	October 15, 2015	16 years, 160 days	(Croatia) Cedevita Zagreb	
14	Enes Kanter	Turkey	PF	May 20, 1992	October 30, 2008	16 years, 163 days	(Turkey) Fenerbahçe Ülker	
15	Marco Belinelli	Italy	SG/SF	March 25, 1986	October 17, 2002	16 years, 206 days	(Italy) Virtus Bologna	
16	Luka Dončić	Slovenia	PG/SG	February 28, 1999	October 16, 2015	16 years, 229 days	(Spain) Real Madrid	
17	Nikola Topić	Serbia	PG	August 10, 2005	April 1, 2022	16 years, 234 days	(Serbia) Crvena zvezda mts	
18	Michalis Lountzis	Greece	PG/SG	August 4, 1998	April 14, 2015	16 years, 253 days	(Greece) Panathinaikos Athens	
19	Ömer Yurtseven	Turkey	C	June 19, 1998	March 20, 2015	16 years, 274 days	(Turkey) Fenerbahçe Ülker	
20	Kostas Vasileiadis	Greece	SG/SF	March 15, 1984	December 20, 2000	16 years, 280 days	(Greece) PAOK	
21	Dino Radončić	Montenegro	SF	January 8, 1999	October 22, 2015	16 years, 287 days	(Spain) Real Madrid	
22	Ismaila Diagne	Senegal	C	December 20, 2006	October 6, 2023	16 years, 290 days	(Spain) Real Madrid	
23	Vassilis Charalampopoulos	Greece	SF	January 6, 1997	December 13, 2013	16 years, 341 days	(Greece) Panathinaikos Athens	
24	Luigi Datome	Italy	SF/PF	November 27, 1987	November 3, 2004	16 years, 342 days	(Italy) Montepaschi Siena	
25	Maciej Lampe	Poland	PF/C	February 5, 1985	January 31, 2002	16 years, 360 days	(Spain) Real Madrid	

== See also ==
- List of oldest and youngest National Basketball Association players
