= Milan Vučićević =

Serbian marketing consultant and basketball player

Milan Vučićević Милан Вучићевић
Personal information
- Born: July 20, 1985 (age 41) Belgrade, SR Serbia, SFR Yugoslavia
- Listed height: 6 ft 10 in (2.08 m)
- Listed weight: 208 lb (94 kg)

Career information
- NBA draft: 2007: undrafted
- Playing career: 2003–2013
- Position: Power forward / center
- Number: 11, 12

Career history
- 2003–2005: Mašinac
- 2005–2006: Ribnica
- 2006–2007: Unia Tarnow (Poland)
- 2007–2008: AGE Halkida (Greece)
- 2008: Budivelnyk Kyiv (Ukraine)
- 2008: KK Vizura
- 2009: KK Tamiš
- 2009: Al Nizwa (Oman)
- 2009: AEK Larnaca (Cyprus)
- 2010: Smart Gilas (Philippines)
- 2010–2011: Al Karameh (Syria)
- 2013: Anibal Zahle (Lebanon)

Milan Vučićević (Serbian Cyrillic: Милан Вучићевић; born July 20, 1985), also known by his online pseudonym Nichim Izazvan, is a Serbian marketing consultant and former professional basketball player.

Vučićević has played professional basketball in several countries including Cyprus, Oman, Ukraine, Greece, and Poland. In May 2010, Samahang Basketbol ng Pilipinas announced that Vučićević will suit up for the developmental Philippine national basketball team, Smart Gilas, in the FIBA Asia Champions Cup 2010.

== Basketball career ==
=== Serbia ===
Vučićević played for KK Tamiš, which represents the city of Pančevo, at the start of the 2008–09 season of Basketball League of Serbia, the highest professional basketball league in the country. The Serbian has also played for several ball clubs in his homeland, namely: Vizura Beograd and KK Mašinac.

=== Cyprus ===
In 2009, Vučićević signed with AEK Larnaca B.C., a professional basketball club based in Larnaca, Cyprus. AEK Larnaca coach Jerry Hemmings was able to watch the skilled center play for Oman basketball team, Al Nizwa, at the Arab Club Championship held in Beirut, Lebanon, and was impressed with his dominating performance. Vučićević averaged 23.5 points and 10.2 rebounds per game during his stint with Al Nizwa.

=== Smart Gilas ===
Samahang Basketbol ng Pilipinas executive director Noli Eala announced in May 2010 that Vučićević will play for Smart Gilas, the Philippines men's national basketball team, in the FIBA Asia Champions Cup 2010. He will play under coach Rajko Toroman, former coach of the Iran national basketball team, and will join notable Smart Gilas players such as Chris Tiu, Japeth Aguilar, and Dylan Ababou, as well as former Oakland University Golden Grizzly Kelly Williams, who will also join the national squad.

== National team career ==
Toroman, who has served as the assistant coach from 1991 to 1995 of the Yugoslavia national basketball team that featured players such as Predrag Danilović, Vlade Divac, and Dejan Bodiroga, has said that Vučićević's performance in the 2010 FIBA Asia Champions Cup will be the team's basis if they will consider him to become a naturalized Filipino.

Smart Gilas officials have decided that, although the Serbian has made a good impression during the FIBA Asia Champions Cup in Doha, Qatar, the team needs a bigger and stronger reinforcement. Vučićević will fly to Turkey after his stint with Gilas.

== Player profile ==
Vučićević is 2.08 m (6 ft 10 in) tall, and plays the center and power forward positions. He has played for several European basketball teams including Age Halkidas (Greece), Unia Tarnow (Poland), and Budivelnik Kyiv (Ukraine).

Outside Europe, Vučićević has suited up for a number of teams such as a.s Bond Shiraz (Iran) and Al Sadd (Qatar), to name a few.

In terms of inside players from Serbia, Vučićević is considered one of the biggest prospects. Aside from having great individual skills, he is often described as a player who possesses a winning mentality and good attitude. He is frequently compared to Serbian basketball legend Zoran Savić, a member of the 1990 FIBA World Championship Yugoslavian team that won the gold medal.

== Interesting facts ==
- Vučićević is the first European to play for the national basketball team of the Philippines, replacing former National Basketball Association players Jamal Sampson and C. J. Giles.
- Before Smart Gilas considered him as the team's naturalization candidate, Vučićević had previously bought an Adidas jacket from a store in Belgrade, sometime in 2008, that had the Philippine flag as part of its design.
