= Edi Sinadinović =

Serbian professional basketball player (born 1988)

Free agent
- Position: Point guard

Personal information
- Born: April 28, 1988 (age 38) Leskovac, SR Serbia, SFR Yugoslavia
- Listed height: 1.93 m (6 ft 4 in)

Career information
- Playing career: 2005–present

Career history
- 2005–2006: Zdravlje Leskovac
- 2006–2008: Mašinac Kraljevo
- 2008–2009: CSKA Sofia
- 2009–2010: MZT Skopje
- 2010–2011: Ovče Pole
- 2011–2012: AEK Argous
- 2012: Zrinjski Mostar
- 2012: Jolly JBŠ
- 2012–2013: Zrinjski Mostar
- 2013–2014: Valga Kalev
- 2014: BCM U Pitești
- 2014–2015: BC Mureș
- 2015: PAOK Thessaloniki
- 2015: MZT Skopje
- 2015: Zdravlje Leskovac
- 2015–2016: Sloboda Tuzla
- 2016–2017: BC Brno
- 2017–2018: Jindřichův Hradec
- 2019–2020: Čapljina Lasta
- 2020: Liepājas

Edi Sinadinović (Serbian Cyrillic: Еди Синадиновић; born April 28, 1988) is a Serbian professional basketball player who last played for Liepājas of the Latvian League.

== Professional career ==
Sinadinović started his career with his hometown club Zdravlje Leskovac. In 2006, he moved to Mašinac Kraljevo and stayed with them for two seasons. For the 2009–10 season he signed with CSKA Sofia, and the next season he played with MZT Skopje.

For the 2010–11 season he signed with the Macedonian club Ovče Pole. The next season, he started with AEK/Argous of the Greek A2 League, and then moved to Zrinjski Mostar of the Bosnian League. In March 2012, he signed with the Croatian club Jolly JBŠ for the rest of the season. The 2012–13 season he started with Zrinjski Mostar. In January 2013, he left Zrinjski. In March 2013, he signed with the Estonian club Valga Kalev. The 2013–14 season he also started with them, but in January 2014, he left Kalev and signed with the Romanian club BCM U Pitești for the rest of the season.

In June 2014, he signed with the Romanian club BC Mureș. On February 2, 2015, he left Mureș and signed with the Greek club PAOK for the rest of the season. In August 2015, he joined KK Partizan on trial. However, he did not signed a contract. On September 30, 2015, he signed with his former club MZT Skopje. On November 6, 2015, he parted ways with MZT after appearing in three league games and seven ABA league games. He then returned to Zdravlje Leskovac. With them he played three games in the Serbian B league, and on December 2, he signed with the Bosnian club Sloboda Tuzla for the rest of the season.

In June 2016, he signed with BC Brno of the Czech Republic National Basketball League. In November 2017, he signed with Jindřichův Hradec.
