= Slobodan Božović =

Serbian basketball player

Personal information
- Born: October 31, 1979 (age 47) Kraljevo, SR Serbia, SFR Yugoslavia
- Listed height: 2.07 m (6 ft 9 in)
- Listed weight: 110 kg (243 lb)

Career information
- Playing career: 1999–2017
- Position: Power forward / center

Career history
- 1999–2000: Zemun
- 2000–2001: Astra Banka
- 2001–2003: Sloga Kraljevo
- 2003–2004: Ergonom
- 2004–2005: Partizan Belgrade
- 2005–2006: Sloga Kraljevo
- 2006: Union Olimpija
- 2006–2007: Apollon Patras
- 2007–2008: Mašinac Kraljevo
- 2008–2009: Sloga Kraljevo
- 2009: AEL Limassol
- 2010–2011: Sloga Kraljevo
- 2011: Zlatorog Laško
- 2011: Sloga Kraljevo
- 2011–2012: Melli Haffari Ahvaz
- 2012–2014: Kožuv
- 2014: Balkan Botevgrad
- 2015: Kožuv
- 2015: Smederevo 1953
- 2015–2016: Iskra Svit
- 2016–2017: Smederevo 1953
- 2017: MBK Baník Handlová

Career highlights
- 2× YUBA League champion (2004, 2005)

Slobodan Božović (Serbian Cyrillic: Слободан Божовић; born October 31, 1979) is a Serbian former professional basketball player.
