= Steffon Bradford =

American basketball player

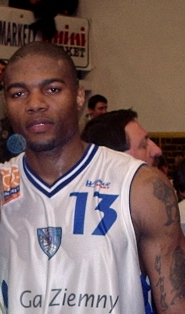

Personal information
- Born: December 7, 1977 (age 48) Clewiston, Florida
- Listed height: 2.00 m (6 ft 7 in)
- Listed weight: 109 kg (240 lb)

Career information
- High school: Clewiston (Clewiston, Florida)
- College: Compton CC (1998–1999); Nebraska (1999–2001)
- NBA draft: 2001: undrafted
- Playing career: 2001–present
- Position: Power forward / center
- Number: 14

Career history
- 2001–2002: Florida Sea Dragons
- 2002–2003: Seoul Samsung Thunders
- 2003: Dodge City Legend
- 2003–2004: Seoul SK Knights
- 2004: Florida Flame
- 2004–2005: Barreirense Basket
- 2005–2006: AZS Koszalin
- 2006–2008: JSF Nanterre
- 2008: AZS Koszalin
- 2008–2009: Maccabi Givat Shmuel
- 2009: Limoges CSP
- 2009–2010: JDA Dijon Basket
- 2010: Hapoel Afula
- 2010–2011: Habik'a
- 2011–2014: Lille Métropole Basket Clubs
- 2014–2015: JA Vichy
- 2015–2016: Aix Maurienne Savoie
- 2016–2017: Saint-Vallier
- 2017–2018: Vendée Challans
- 2018–2019: B. Löwen
- 2019–2021: Tonga men's national basketball team

Steffon Bradford (born December 7, 1977) is an American professional basketball player, from Clewiston, Florida. Steffon Bradford currently coaches 12 AAU teams LES Bulldogs through his company Lifeline Elite Sports.
