= Adam Wójcik =

Polish basketball player (1970–2017)

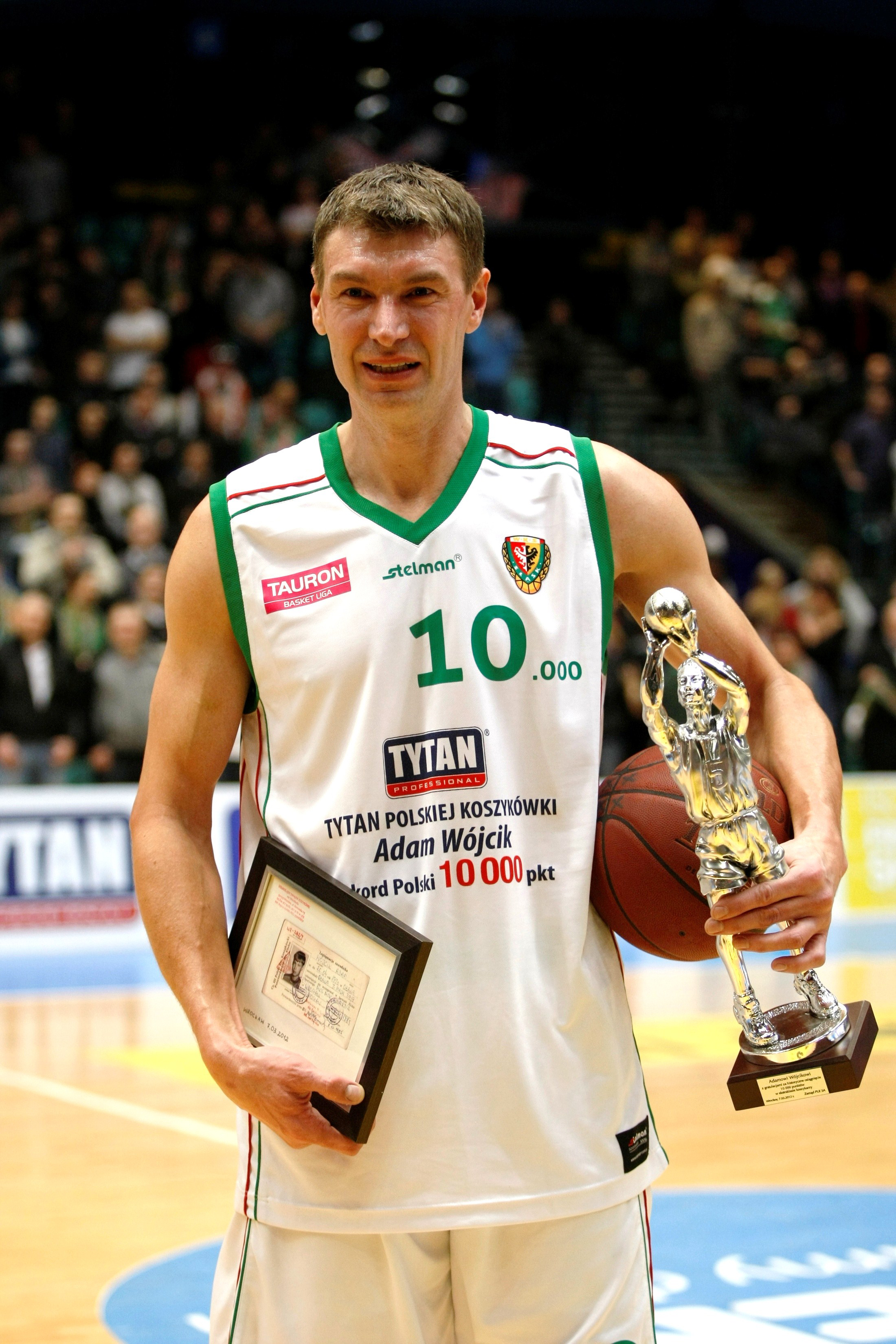
- Adam Wójcik in 2012

Personal information
- Born: 20 April 1970 Oława, Poland
- Died: 26 August 2017 (aged 47) Wrocław, Poland
- Listed height: 2.08 m (6 ft 10 in)
- Listed weight: 110 kg (243 lb)

Career information
- NBA draft: 1992: undrafted
- Playing career: 1987–2012
- Position: Power forward / center
- Number: 10

Career history
- 1987–1994: Gwardia Wrocław
- 1994–1995: Znic Pruszków
- 1995–1996: Bobry Bytom
- 1996: Oostende
- 1996–1997: Spirou Charleroi
- 1997–2001: Śląsk Wrocław
- 2001–2002: Peristeri
- 2002–2003: Unicaja Malaga
- 2003–2004: Śląsk Wrocław
- 2004–2007: Prokom Trefl Sopot
- 2007–2008: Orlandina Basket
- 2008–2009: PBG Basket Poznań
- 2009–2010: Turów Zgorzelec
- 2010–2011: WKK Wrocław
- 2011–2012: Śląsk Wrocław

Career highlights
- FIBA European Selection Team (1996); FIBA EuroStar (2007); Greek League All-Star (2002); 8× Polish League champion (1995, 1998–2001, 2005–2007); 3× Polish League MVP (1998, 2001, 2005); 3× Polish League Finals MVP (1998, 2001, 2005); 9× All-Polish League Team (1990–1993, 1995, 1998, 1999, 2001, 2005); 10× Polish League All-Star (1994, 1995, 1998–2001, 2004–2006, 2009); 2× Polish All-Star Game MVP (1999, 2009); 2× Polish Cup winner (2004, 2006); 2× Polish Supercup winner (1999, 2000); Belgian League champion (1997)

Adam Wójcik (20 April 1970 – 26 August 2017) was a Polish professional basketball player. He was known as one of the all-time greats in Polish basketball. He is the second all-time leading scorer of the Polish Basketball League, since the year 1976, with 10,097 points scored.

== Professional career ==
On club level, he played in his native Poland, and also in Belgium, Greece, Italy and Spain. Since official stats records keeping by the Polish Basketball Association began in the year 1976, Wójcik is second in the all-time list of games played in the Polish League, with a total of 651, and in total points scored, with 10,097 points.

He was a three-time Polish League MVP, and also the finals MVP in 1998, 2001, and 2005. He won eight Polish League championships, two Polish Cups, and he was also a Belgian League champion, in 1997.

Wojcik made his EuroLeague debut in 2002 with Peristeri of Greece, the first of his six consecutive seasons in the competition. In his debut season, 2001–02, he was the EuroLeague's eighth-best scorer, with 18.4 points per game. Next, he made one-year stops at Unicaja Malaga and Śląsk Wrocław, before spending three seasons in a row with Prokom Trefl Sopot, and leading the team to the EuroLeague Top 16 twice. He finished his EuroLeague career with a 10.8 points per game scoring average, for a total of 1,030 points, over 95 games. He subsequently played one season in the second tier level EuroCup, in the 2009–10 season, with Turów Zgorzelec of Poland. He retired in 2012.

== National team career ==
With the senior Polish national basketball team, Wojcik played in 149 games, the second most in the Polish national team's history, and he scored 1,821 points. He played at four EuroBasket's - 1991, 1997, 2007, and 2009.

== Death ==
On 26 August 2017, Wojcik died at the age of 47, of leukemia.

== Awards and accomplishments ==
=== Club career ===
- 8× Polish League champion: 1995, 1998–2001, 2005–2007
- Polish Cup winner: 2004, 2006
- 2× Polish Supercup winner: 1999, 2000
- Belgian League Champion: 1997

=== Individual awards ===
- FIBA European Selection Team (1996)
- 3× PLK Most Valuable Player: 1998, 2001, 2005
- 3× PLK Finals MVP: 1998, 2001, 2005
- 9× All-PLK Team: 1990–1993, 1995, 1998, 1999, 2001, 2005
- 10× PLK All-Star: 1994, 1995, 1998–2001, 2004–2006, 2009
- 2× PLK All-Star Game MVP: 1999, 2009
- Greek League All-Star: 2002
- FIBA EuroStar: 2007
