= Harding Nana =

Cameroonian professional basketball player

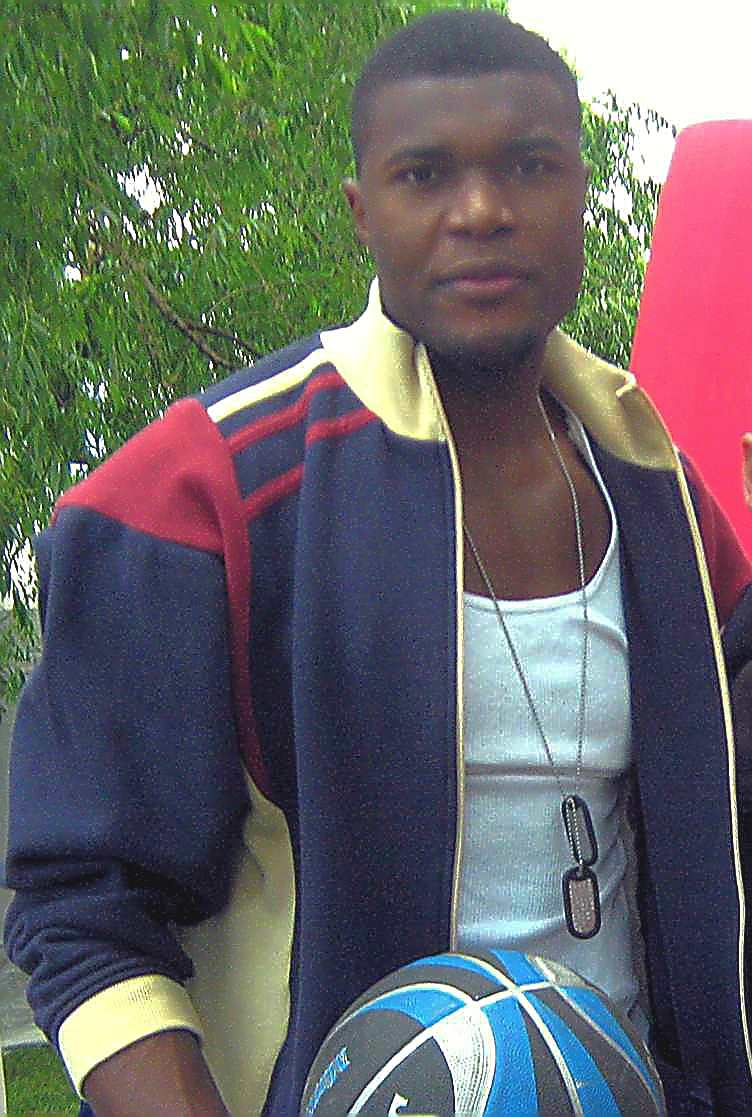

Swiss Central
- Position: Power forward
- League: Swiss Basketball League

Personal information
- Born: January 17, 1981 (age 45) Douala, Cameroon
- Listed height: 6 ft 8 in (2.03 m)
- Listed weight: 230 lb (100 kg)

Career information
- College: Virginia Tech (2001–2002); Delaware (2003–2006)
- NBA draft: 2006: undrafted
- Playing career: 2006–present

Career history
- 2006–2007: Polpak Świecie
- 2007–2008: Turów Zgorzelec
- 2008–2009: Beirasar Rosalía
- 2009–2011: Polonia Warszawa
- 2011–2012: Ilysiakos
- 2012–2015: Phantoms Braunschweig
- 2015–2016: Koroivos Amaliadas
- 2016–2018: Svendborg Rabbits
- 2018–present: Swiss Central

Career highlights
- PLK All-Star Game MVP (2011); 2x First-team All-CAA (2005, 2006)

Harding Ngueyep Nana (born January 17, 1981) is a Cameroonian professional basketball player currently playing as a power forward for Swiss Central of the Swiss Basketball League. He is also a member of the Cameroon national basketball team.

== College career ==
Nana signed with Virginia Tech out of Notre Dame Prep in Kensington, Maryland. In 2001–02, his first season with the Hokies, he played in only three games before missing the rest of the season after undergoing knee surgery. He did not appear in any games for the Hokies in the 2002–03 before requesting a transfer to the University of Delaware. At Delaware, he was a three-year starter for the Blue Hens after sitting out the first several games of his sophomore season due to NCAA transfer rules. In his junior season, his first full season as a starter he averaged 18.5 PPG and 10.4 RPG to lead the Colonial Athletic Association in both categories en route to a first team All-CAA selection. He followed that up with a 19.0 PPG and 10.9 RPG performance in his senior season After becoming only the fourth Blue Hen to score 1,300 points and grab 700 rebounds, he was named outstanding senior athlete by the University of Delaware.

== Professional career ==
Following graduation, Nana signed with Polpak Świecie of the Polish League. He had a solid first season with the team, averaging 14.3 PPG and 7.6 RPG. Following this season he moved to fellow Polish League side Turów Zgorzelec, which had qualified for the ULEB Eurocup for the 2007–08 season. Despite his successful first season, he rarely cracked the rotation for his new squad, averaging less than four points and three rebounds per game in 27 league games and nine ULEB Eurocup games. Following this disappointing campaign, Nana moved to Beirasar Rosalía of the Spanish Basketball League for the 2008–09 season, averaging 10.0 PPG and 6.8 RPG in a successful first season with the new team. He later returned to Poland to join Polonia Warszawa for the 2009–10 season and since then he remained with the club. On 16 January 2011 at the PLK All Star Match held in Kalisz, Poland, Harding led the South team to a great victory against the North 119-117 scoring 26 with 5 offensive rebounds and 2 defensive rebounds. He was the MVP of the 2011 Polish League All Star Game.

== National team career ==
Nana joined the Cameroon national basketball team following the country's qualification for the FIBA World Olympic Qualifying Tournament for Men 2008. He was Cameroon's leading scorer, scoring 24 points against Croatia and 22 points to go along with 14 rebounds against Puerto Rico. Still, Cameroon was eliminated after losing to both teams in close games. Nana again played for Cameroon at the FIBA Africa Championship 2009. He averaged 9.6 PPG and 5.7 RPG for the team as they narrowly missed out on qualifying for the 2010 FIBA World Championship after losing the bronze medal game.
