= Grady Reynolds =

American basketball player

Grady Reynolds is a professional basketball player from Alabama. Reynolds attended and played on college teams including the 2003–04 St. John's Red Storm men's basketball team and the 2002–03 St. John's Red Storm men's basketball team. He was involved in an incident involving a female member of the school swim team. He left the team after players were involved in an off-the-court incident. After college he played professional basketball at AZS Koszalin.

== Team history ==
- 2000–2002: Southern Union State Community College
- 2002–2004: St. John's (NCAA)
- 2004–2005: Fjolnir
- 2005–2006: Klal Bituah Ramat-Hasharon
- 2006–2007: Polonia Warszawa
- 2008–2009: Znicz Jarosław
- 2009–2010: Faymasa Palencia
- 2010: Hebraica Macabi
- 2011: AZS Koszali
