= Žarko Čomagić =

Serbian basketball player (born 1985)

Free agent
- Position: Small forward

Personal information
- Born: September 28, 1985 (age 41) Kraljevo, SR Serbia, SFR Yugoslavia
- Listed height: 1.99 m (6 ft 6 in)
- Listed weight: 101 kg (223 lb)

Career information
- College: Northern Arizona (2007–2009)
- Playing career: 2009–2020

Career history
- 2010–2011: Stelmet Zielona Góra
- 2011–2012: PBG Basket Poznań
- 2012: Vojvodina
- 2012–2014: CSM Oradea
- 2014–2015: Pierniki Toruń
- 2015–2016: Falco KC
- 2016: CSM Oradea
- 2016–2017: OKK Beograd
- 2017: Karpoš Sokoli
- 2018–2019: Sloboda Užice
- 2019–2020: Sloga

Žarko Čomagić (born September 28, 1985) is former a Serbian professional basketball player.

== Playing career ==
In 2017, he played for Karpoš Sokoli of the Macedonian League.
