= Janusz Pęcherz =

Polish politician (born 1954)

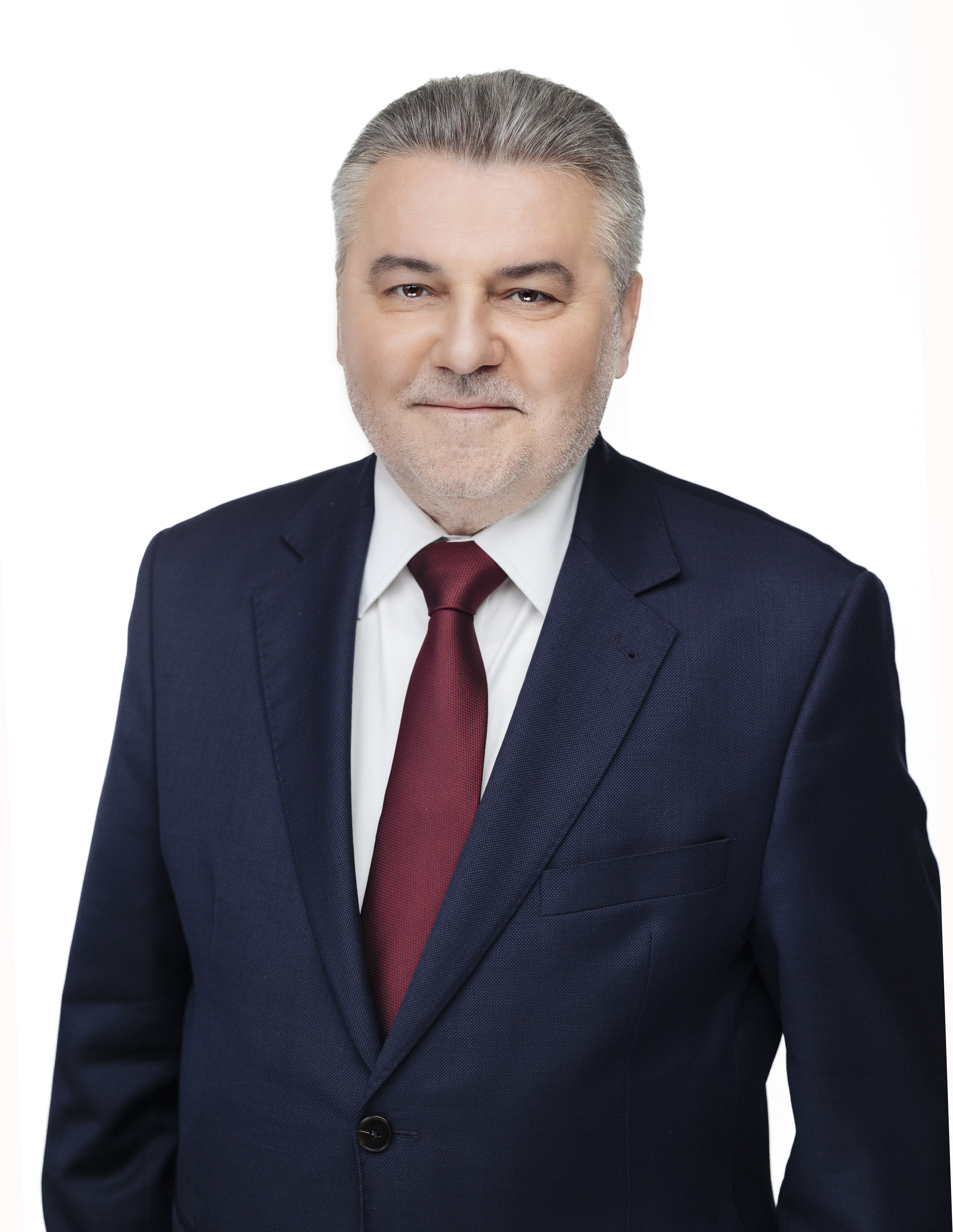

Member of the Senate of Poland

Personal details
- Born: 6 November 1954 (age 71)

Janusz Andrzej Pęcherz (born 6 November 1954) is a Polish politician. He was elected to the Senate of Poland (10th term) representing the constituency of Kalisz. He graduated from the Faculty of Chemistry at the Lodz University of Technology. In 2002, he was elected president of Kalisz. In the 2006 local government elections, he successfully ran for re-election, running with the support of several local parties and winning the first round. In 2010, he again won the third term in the first round with about 51% of the vote. In 2014, he was not re-elected for another term. In 2018, he was appointed a city councilor in Kalisz, and then became the head of the city council.

He was also elected to the 11th term of the Senate of Poland.
