= Andrzej Pluta =

Polish basketball player and coach

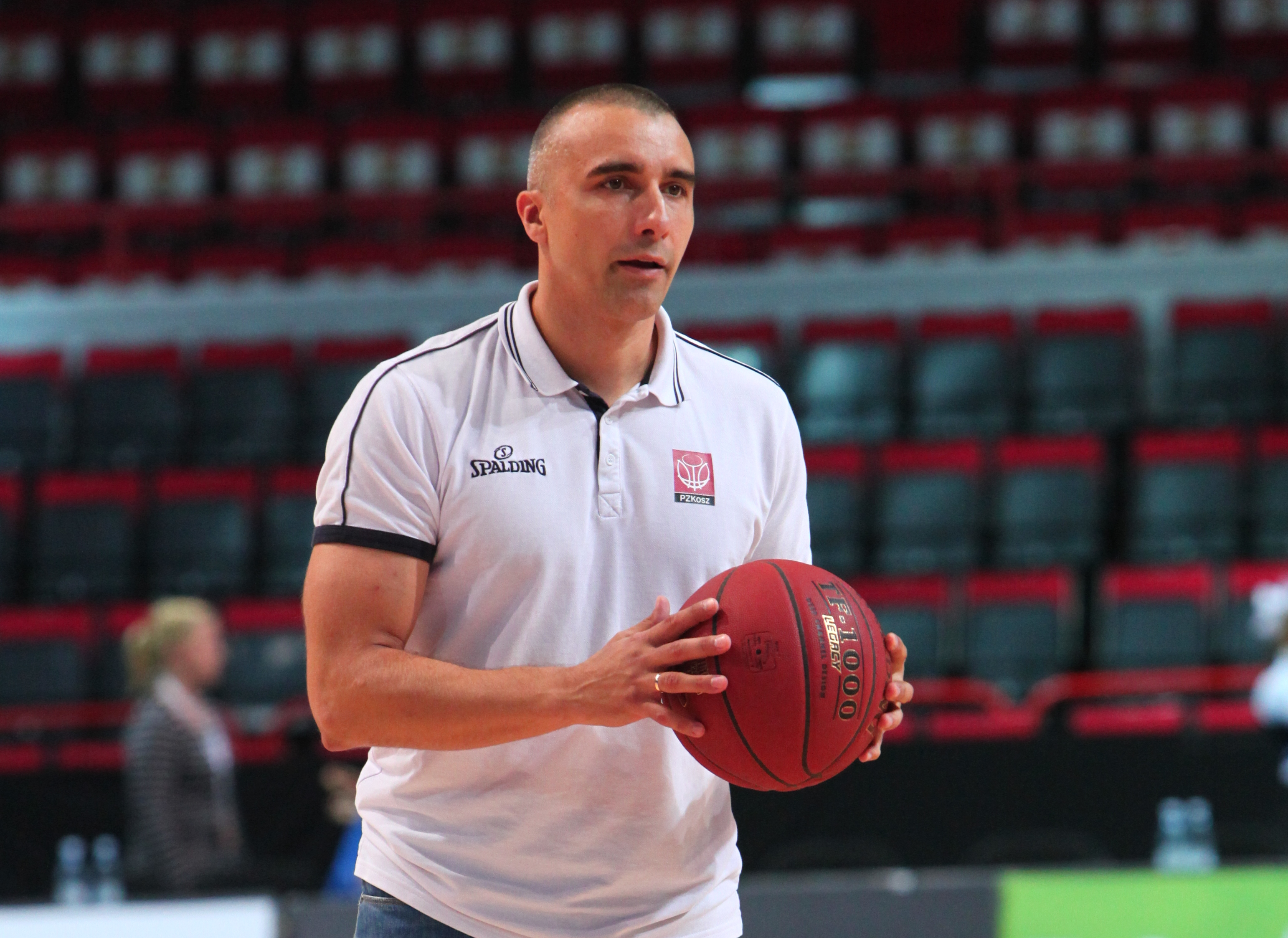
- Pluta in 2012

Personal information
- Born: 26 April 1974 (age 52) Ruda Śląska, Poland
- Listed height: 182 cm (6 ft 0 in)
- Listed weight: 80 kg (176 lb)

Career information
- Playing career: 1989–2011
- Position: Point guard

Career history

Playing
- 1989–1994: Pogoń Ruda Śląska
- 1994–1999: Bobry Bytom
- 1999–2000: Pogoń Ruda Śląska
- 2000–2001: Czarni Słupsk
- 2001–2002: MKS Znicz Basket Pruszków
- 2002–2003: Anwil Włocławek
- 2003–2004: Prokom Trefl Sopot
- 2004–2005: ESPE Basket Châlons-en-Champagne
- 2005–2006: Turów Zgorzelec
- 2006–2011: Anwil Włocławek

Coaching
- 2012–2014: Anwil Włocławek (assistant)

Career highlights
- 2× PLK champion (2003, 2004); Polish Cup champion (2007); Polish Cup MVP (2007); PLK All-Star Game MVP (2008); 12× PLK All-Star (1996–2000, 2003, 2004, 2006–2008, 2010, 2011); No. 10 retired by Anwil Włocławek

Andrzej Pluta (born 26 April 1974) is a Polish retired basketball player and current coach. He played professionally in Poland and one season in France. His jersey number 10 was retired by Anwil Włocławek, where he played for six seasons.
