= Chris Thomas (basketball player) =

Polish-American basketball player (born 1982)

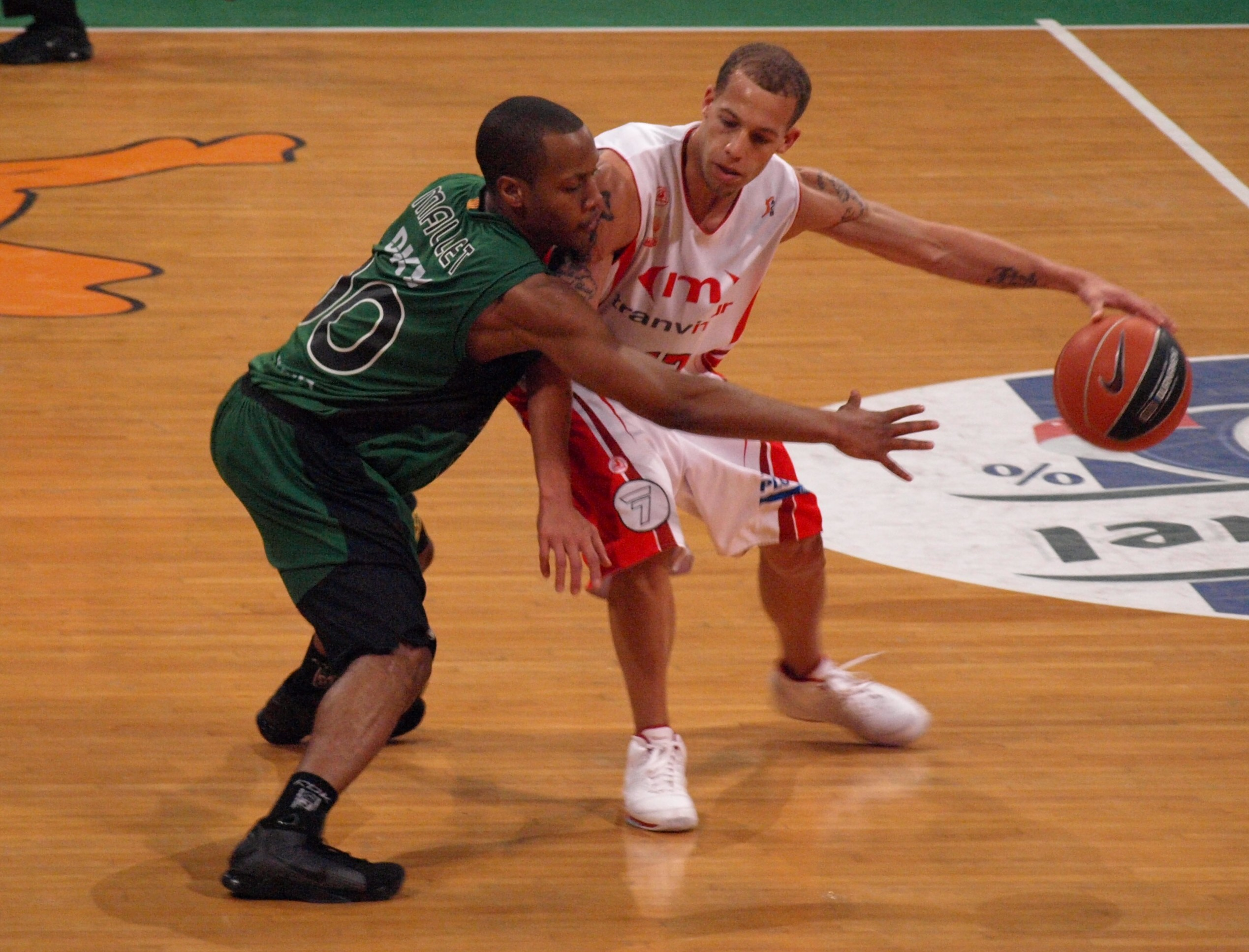
- Thomas (right) playing for CB Murcia

Personal information
- Born: October 3, 1982 (age 44) Indianapolis, Indiana, U.S.
- Listed height: 6 ft 1 in (1.85 m)
- Listed weight: 180 lb (82 kg)

Career information
- High school: Pike (Indianapolis, Indiana)
- College: Notre Dame (2001–2005)
- NBA draft: 2005: undrafted
- Playing career: 2005–2012
- Position: Point guard

Career history
- 2005–2006: Fabriano Basket
- 2006–2007: Maroussi
- 2007: Anwil Włocławek
- 2007–2009: Murcia
- 2009–2010: Fuenlabrada
- 2010–2011: Anwil Włocławek
- 2011–2012: Hapoel Gilboa Galil

Career highlights
- Fourth-team Parade All-American (2001); Indiana Mr. Basketball (2001); McDonald's All-American (2001)

Christopher Ryan Thomas (born October 3, 1982) is an American former professional basketball player who is an alumnus of Pike High School and the University of Notre Dame.

== High school ==
Thomas led the Pike High School Red Devils to 2 state titles in his 4 years at Pike. In 2001, he was named Indiana's "Mr. Basketball". He was also named 2001 McDonald's All-American and 2001 Indiana All-Star.

== College ==
Thomas chose Notre Dame over Stanford, Duke and Michigan State. At Notre Dame he was an economics major in the College of Arts and Letters. After College he still is in the UND basketball record books for a number of categories. Upon graduation, he ranked fourth all-time on the Notre Dame's all-time scoring list with 2,195 points. He was also the school's all-time leader in assists, and ranked 4th in NCAA history, having dished out 833 in his career. His career scoring average of 18.0 ppg ranks 11th on the school's all-time list. He also ranks second all-time in school history with 302 3-Point Field Goals, first in steals with 244, and 11th in 3 Point Field Goal Percentage. He recorded the only triple-double in school history, against University of New Hampshire, when he scored 24 points, had 11 assists, and 11 steals in his first game. He was named to the First Team All Notre Dame team as the point guard. This team was put together to celebrate 100 years of Notre Dame basketball and Thomas was the first team point guard. He is one of 3 players to ever record 2,000 points and 800 assists in NCAA history.

=== Freshman ===
Thomas received was awarded Big East Conference Freshman of the Year. He also won the National Freshman of the Year by Basketball Times and Basketball News. He finished as the team's second-leading scorer with a 15.6 scoring average.

=== Sophomore ===
He finished his season second in scoring again with an 18.7 scoring average. He became the 43rd player in Notre Dame basketball history to score 1,000 career points and just seventh player to reach the mark in his second season. Coming off a season where he garnered Associated Press honorable mention All-American honors, Thomas declared himself eligible for the 2003 NBA draft on May 6, 2003. After participating in individual workouts with a number of teams, Thomas never got a guarantee he would be a first-round pick, which meant a guaranteed three-year contract. Thomas withdrew on June 6 to return to Notre Dame for the 2003–04 year.

=== Junior ===
He was named to the Associated Press Honorable Mention selection and Big East Conference second-team honoree for the second straight year. He became the Notre Dame career leader in assists with 638, setting the record in home game against Connecticut on February 9, 2004. He is the only player in Notre Dame basketball history to score more than 1,700 points and dish off 600-plus assists.

=== Senior ===
Despite playing with knee injury throughout the season, averaged 14.2 points, 6.7 assists, 5.0 rebounds in 38.3 minutes per game. He never missed a game during his Irish career and started all 128 contests despite undergoing arthroscopic knee surgery for a cartilage tear in left kneecap on April 9.

== Professional career ==
2006/07: Anwil (PLK) 2007/08 and 2008/09 CB Murcia, Spain Thomas was currently playing for Baloncesto Fuenlabrada, Ayuda en acción Fuenlabrada in Spain's top professional basketball league the Liga ACB during the 2009/2010 season. The American guard left the club due to the team's financial difficulties and signed a 2-year contrant with Anwil Wloclawek in Poland, in which he played for in 2007 and their team won the Cup in Poland. Thomas terminated his contract with Anwil Wloclawek and went to play in Israel's top league for Galil Gilboa, which finished 2nd this past season. There he won the Balkan League Championship with the club, their first European title in club's history.

== See also ==
- List of NCAA Division I men's basketball players with 11 or more steals in a game
