= Ivan Koljević =

Montenegrin basketball player

Prizreni
- Position: Point guard
- League: Kosovo Basketball Superleague

Personal information
- Born: 30 June 1984 (age 42) Cetinje, SR Montenegro, SFR Yugoslavia
- Listed height: 1.86 m (6 ft 1 in)
- Listed weight: 79 kg (174 lb)

Career information
- NBA draft: 2006: undrafted
- Playing career: 2000–2024
- Coaching career: 2024–present

Career history

Playing
- 2000–2002: Lovćen
- 2002–2005: Budućnost Podgorica
- 2005–2006: Bilbao Basket
- 2006: Olympiacos
- 2006–2007: Bilbao Basket
- 2007: Lietuvos rytas
- 2007–2008: PBC Ural Great Perm
- 2008–2009: Cherkaski Mavpy
- 2009: Bornova Belediye
- 2010: Khimik Yuzhny
- 2010: Trikala 2000
- 2010–2011: Turów Zgorzelec
- 2011: Polpharma Starogard Gdański
- 2012: Cherkaski Mavpy
- 2012–2013: BC Odesa
- 2014: Esteghlal Qeshm
- 2015: Naft Abadan
- 2016–2017: Towzin Electric Kashan
- 2017–2018: Lovćen 1947
- 2018: Šenčur
- 2019–2020: Studentski Centar
- 2020–2021: Trepça
- 2021–2022: Rahoveci
- 2022–2023: Ponte Prizreni
- 2023: Peja
- 2023–2024: Proton Cable Prizreni

Coaching
- 2024–present: Proton Cable Prizreni (assistant)

Ivan Koljević (Cyrillic: Иван Кољевић; born 30 June 1984) is a Montenegrin former professional basketball player and coach. He is 1.86 m (6 ft 1 in) tall point guard.

In January 2014, he signed with Esteghlal Zarin Qeshm of the Iranian Basketball Super League.
