= Paul Miller (basketball) =

American basketball player (born 1982)

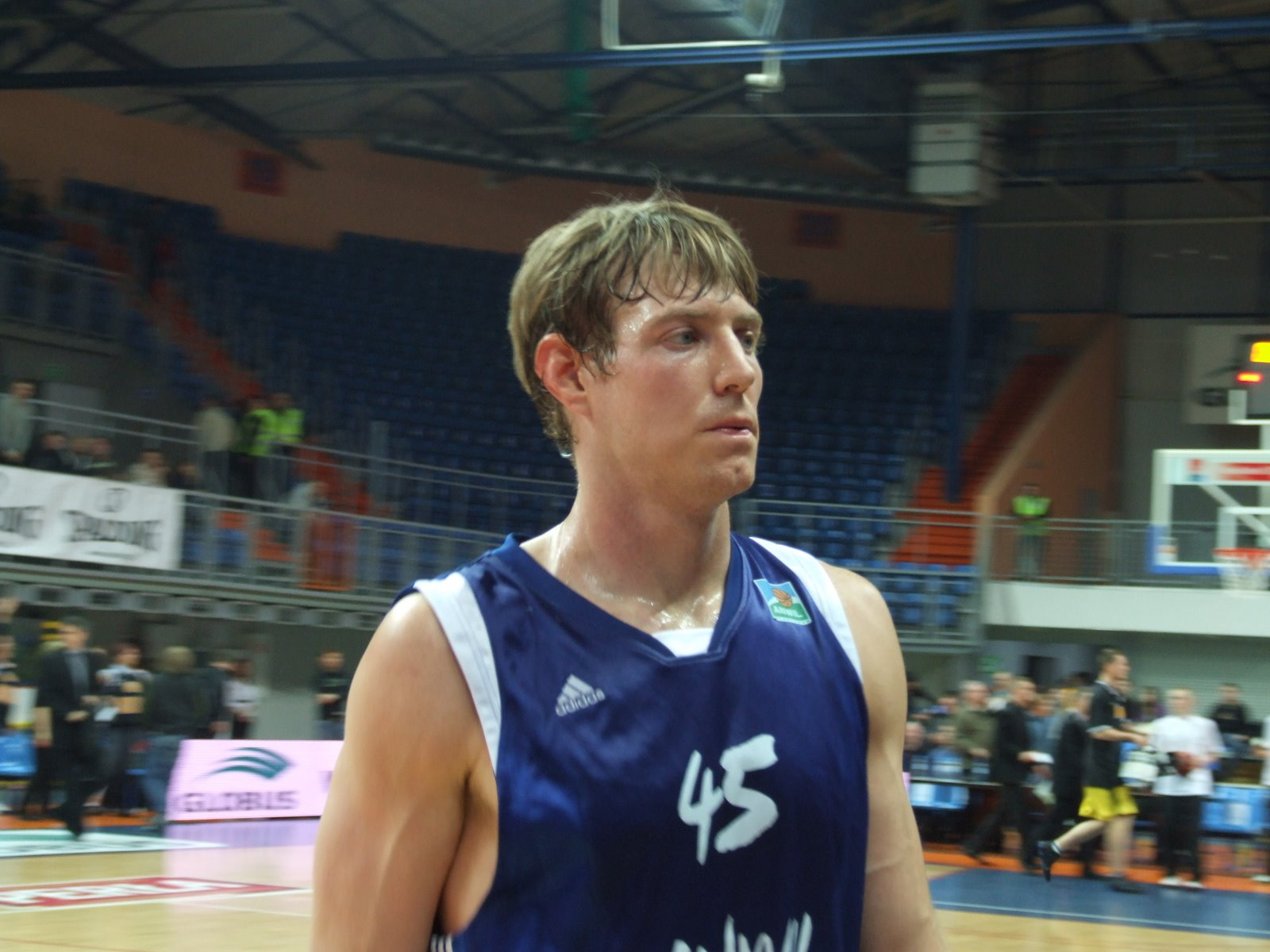

Personal information
- Born: November 17, 1982 (age 43) Jefferson City, Missouri, U.S.
- Listed height: 6 ft 10 in (2.08 m)
- Listed weight: 250 lb (113 kg)

Career information
- High school: Blair Oaks (Jefferson City, Missouri)
- College: Wichita State (2001–2006)
- NBA draft: 2006: undrafted
- Playing career: 2006–2014
- Position: Power forward / center

Career history
- 2006–2007: Eisbären Bremerhaven
- 2007–2008: Polonia Warbud Warszawa
- 2008–2009: Anwil Wloclawek
- 2009–2010: BC Triumph Lyubertsy
- 2010–2011: Anwil Wloclawek
- 2011: Aliağa Petkim
- 2011–2012: Bandırma Kırmızı
- 2012–2013: JDA Dijon Basket
- 2013–2014: Śląsk Wrocław

Career highlights
- MVC Player of the Year (2006); First-team All-MVC (2006); AP Honorable Mention All-American (2006)

Paul Miller (born November 17, 1982) is an American former professional basketball player. A 6'10" center/forward from Jefferson City, Missouri, Miller was an honorable mention All-American player at Wichita State University.

== College career ==
After starring at Blair Oaks High School in Jefferson City, Miller played collegiately for coach Mark Turgeon at Wichita State. Three games into his freshman year in 2001, Miller broke his foot and was lost for the season. After a redshirt year spent adding weight, Miller averaged 7.4 points and 4.7 rebounds per game in 2002–03 NCAA Division I men's basketball season and was named to the Missouri Valley Conference (MVC) All-Freshman team. Miller increased his scoring average each of the next three years.

As a senior in 2005–06, Miller led the Shockers to a regular-season MVC championship and an at large berth in the 2006 NCAA Tournament. Once there, the Shockers made the most of their trip, defeating Seton Hall in the first round and upsetting second seeded Tennessee in the second round to advance to the Sweet Sixteen for the fourth time in school history. For the season, Miller averaged 13.1 points and 6.6 rebounds and was named first team All-MVC and MVC Player of the Year. He was later named an honorable mention All-American by the Associated Press.

== Professional career ==
Following his college career, Miller was not selected in the 2006 NBA draft. He was invited to play for the New York Knicks Summer League team, but did not make the final roster. Miller headed for Germany to play for Eisbären Bremerhaven of the Basketball Bundesliga, where he averaged 4.7 points and 2.3 rebounds per game. The next few years, Miller played in Poland (for Polonia Warbud Warszawa and WTK Anwil Wloclawek), Russia (for BC Triumph Lyubertsy) and Turkey (for Aliağa Petkim and Bandırma Kırmızı). In 2012, he signed with JDA Dijon Basket of France's first division.

== Commentator ==
In 2017, Miller served as an analyst for Cox Channel Kansas covering his alma mater.
