= Ted Scott (basketball) =

American professional basketball player (born 1985)

Personal information
- Born: June 19, 1985 (age 41) Columbus, Ohio, U.S.
- Listed height: 6 ft 2 in (1.88 m)
- Listed weight: 192 lb (87 kg)

Career information
- High school: Whetstone (Columbus, Ohio)
- College: West Virginia State (2004–2009)
- NBA draft: 2008: undrafted
- Playing career: 2009–2013
- Position: Shooting guard

Career history
- 2009–2010: Sportino Inowrocław
- 2010: Ferro-ZNTU
- 2010–2011: SKK Kotwica Kołobrzeg
- 2011–2012: Benfica
- 2012–2013: Skyliners Frankfurt
- 2013: Melilla

Career highlights
- Polish League Top Scorer (2011)

Ted Scott (born June 19, 1985) is an American former professional basketball player who last played with Club Melilla Baloncesto in the LEB Oro, the Spanish second division.

== College career ==
Born in Columbus, Ohio, Scott started his basketball career competing at Whetstone High School, and that led to receiving a scholarship at West Virginia State University, playing for the NCAA Division II team, West Virginia State.

At West Virginia, Scott improved his scoring ability every year, shooting 40% or more in four out of five years, being named All-WVIAC Player of the Year in 2007 and 2009. In the last three years, he upgraded from an average of 27 points per game to 29 points per game in the 2007–08, with shooting averages of 50% in field goals, 54.5% in three-pointers, and 85.7% from free-throws. In his final year at West Virginia, he suffered an ACL knee injury with two games played, but still averaged 23.4 points per game, with shooting averages of 50.3% from field goals, 34.6% in three-pointers and 82.8% from the free throw line.

Scott never shot less than 81.5% from the free throw line over the five years, with 2005-06, being the best with 85.9%. He finished his college career in Virginia State, with a second place in both, points over the career (2368) and over a season (892 in 2006-07), plus sixth place in scoring average (19.7).

== Professional career ==
After not being drafted, Scott moved to Europe and had brief experiences at Sportino Inowrocław in the Polish Basketball League, with an average of 20 points per game, on just 10 games, before moved again, joining BC Ferro-ZNTU on the Ukrainian Basketball SuperLeague. He returned to Poland in the following season, making an immediate impact, averaging 25.4 points per game and leading the league in the scoring charts.

Scott then made a move to the Portuguese Basketball League to join Benfica, being an important part in the league title campaign, averaging 16.97 points per game in the regular season, and increasing to 18.72 in the playoffs, being instrumental on the game 5 of the final against Porto, on 23 May 2012.

Following the performances in Portugal, he moved to the more competitive BBL in the summer of 2013, to play for the Skyliners Frankfurt under coach Muli Katzurin. He averaged 13.5 points per game in 12 games, but as the Skyliners were nearing the bottom of the table, management opted to release Scott. He finished the season at LEB Oro team, Club Melilla Baloncesto, signing on 16 February 2013, and averaging 14.8 points per game in 8 games, as the team finished dead last in 2012–13 LEB Oro season.

== Titles ==
Benfica

- Liga Portuguesa de Basquetebol: 2011–12
- António Pratas Trophy: 2011–12
