= Igor Miličić =

Croatian basketball coach & player (born 1976)

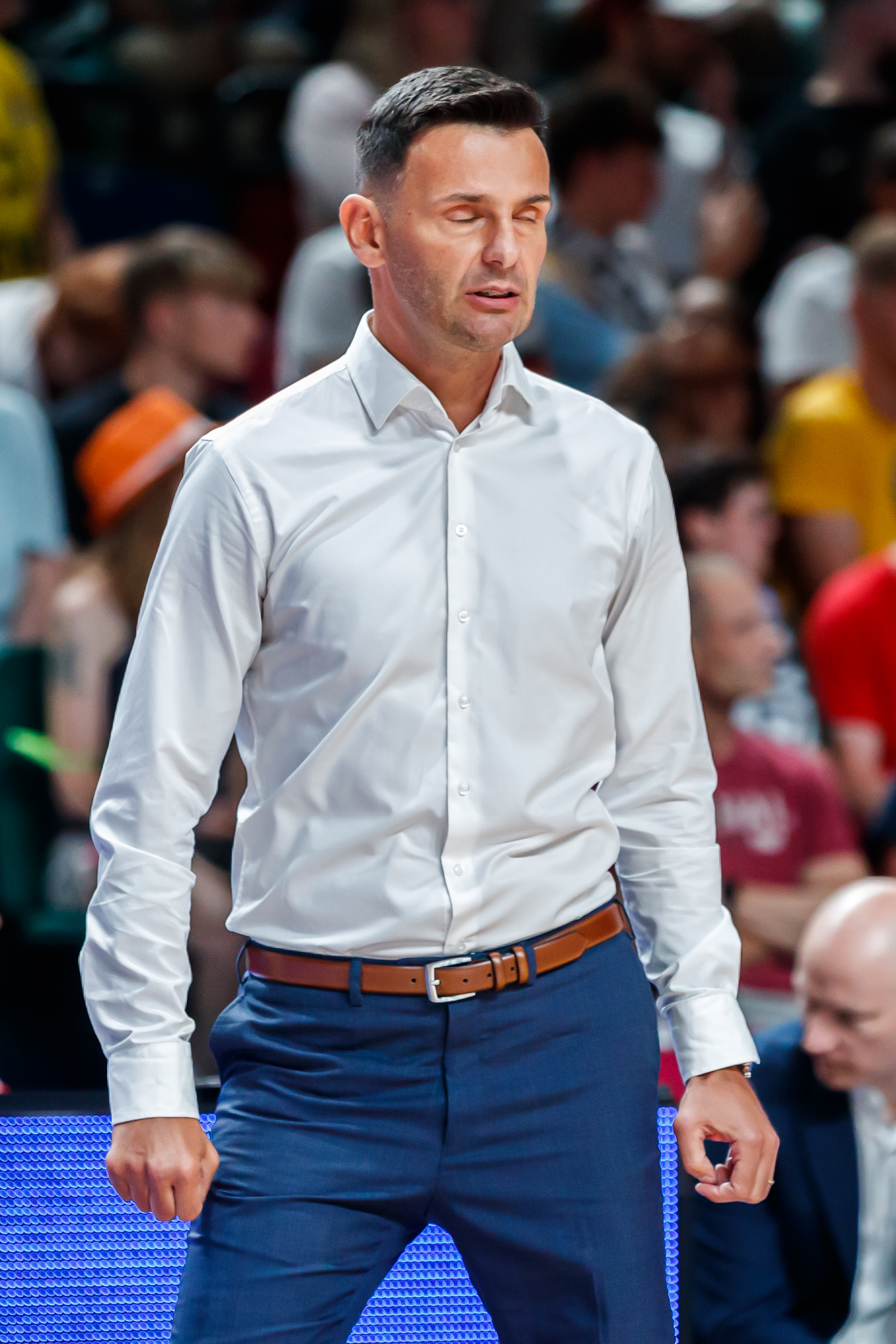
- Miličić in 2022

Personal information
- Born: June 9, 1976 (age 50) Slavonski Brod, Croatia, Yugoslavia
- Listed height: 196 cm (6 ft 5 in)

Career information
- NBA draft: 1998: undrafted
- Playing career: 1996–2013
- Position: Guard
- Coaching career: 2013–present

Career history

Playing
- 1993–1996: Split
- 1996–1997: Kvarner
- 1997–1999: Split
- 1999–2000: UMKS Kielce
- 2000: Polonia Warsaw
- 2000–2002: Prokom Sopot
- 2002–2003: Anwil Włocławek
- 2003–2004: Iraklis
- 2004: Trepça
- 2005: Tuborg Pilsener
- 2005–2006: Belfius Mons-Hainaut
- 2006–2007: Türk Telekom
- 2007: Enisey
- 2007–2008: Prokom Sopot
- 2008–2013: AZS Koszalin

Coaching
- 2014–2015: AZS Koszalin
- 2015–2020: Włocławek
- 2020–2022: Stal Ostrów Wielkopolski
- 2021–present: Poland
- 2022–2023: Beşiktaş
- 2023–2024: Napoli Basket
- 2025–2026: Aris Thessaloniki

Career highlights
- As player: Polish League champion (2008); 3× Polish Cup winner (2001, 2008, 2010); Belgian Cup winner (2006); Kosovan Cup winner (2004); Polish Cup MVP (2001); Polish League assists leader (2011); As head coach: 3× Polish League champion (2018, 2019, 2021); 2× Polish Cup winner (2020, 2022); Italian Cup winner (2024); 2× Polish Supercup winner (2017, 2019); Polish League Best Coach (2017)
Medals
Men's basketball
Representing Croatia
FIBA Europe Under-18 Championship
Silver medal – second place	1994 Israel	U-18 Team

Igor Miličić (born June 9, 1976) is a Croatian-Polish professional basketball coach and former player. He last worked as the head coach for Aris Thessaloniki of the Greek Basketball League. He is currently the head coach for Poland men's national basketball team.

== Professional playing career ==
Miličić was one of the most talented players of the Split youth teams in the 1990-s. As the starting playmaker he was one the leaders of the Croatia national under-18 basketball team that won silver at the 1994 FIBA Europe Under-18 Championship. After suffering a serious injury and a long recovery time, he moved to the Polish Basketball League. In Poland he became one of the best players of the league.

== National team career ==
Miličić was named in the roster of the Croatia men's national basketball team in February 1998 for a FIBA EuroBasket 1999 qualification match against Netherlands. This was the only time he was in the roster failing to appear on court.

== Coaching career ==
Miličić retired in 2013 as a player of AZS Koszalin. He stayed in the same club as an assistant coach for Zoran Sretenović. After a series of bad results and head coach changes, Miličić was named the head coach. Under coach Miličić the team won nine out of last ten games of the 2013–14 PLK season, making it the playoffs. In the next season, he led the team to the 3rd position before playoffs. He later led Anwil Włocławek to two winning two Polish League championships and Stal Ostrów Wielkopolski to another one, establishing himself as one of the best coaches in Poland.

In December 2022, Miličić took over Beşiktaş of the Turkish Super League. He only led until the end of the season.

On June 16, 2023, he signed with Napoli Basket of the Italian Lega Basket Serie A (LBA). With this team he won the Italian Cup.

On October 26, 2025, he became the new coach of the Greek club Aris Thessaloniki.

== National team coaching career ==
Miličić took over the Poland men's national basketball team in 2021. He led Poland to fourth place at the EuroBasket 2022, surprisingly defeating Slovenia in the quarterfinals.

== Personal life ==
Miličić's sons Igor Jr. (born 2002), Zoran (born 2006) and Teo (born 2008) all successfully play basketball. Igor Jr. played at the FIBA U20 European Championship and debuted for the senior Poland men's national basketball team.
