= George Reese =

American basketball player (born 1977)

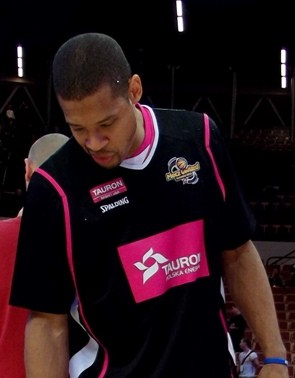
- Reese in Poland in 2012.

Personal information
- Born: May 8, 1977 (age 49) Columbus, Ohio, U.S.
- Listed height: 6 ft 7 in (2.01 m)
- Listed weight: 233 lb (106 kg)

Career information
- High school: Independence (Columbus, Ohio)
- College: John A. Logan (1997–1998); Ohio State (1998–2000)
- NBA draft: 2000: undrafted
- Playing career: 2000–2012
- Position: Small forward
- Number: 9

Career history
- 2000: Hermine de Nantes Atlantique
- 2000–2001: Cincinnati Stuff
- 2001: Trenton Shooting Stars
- 2001–2002: Columbus Riverdragons
- 2002: Asheville Altitude
- 2002–2003: Sioux Falls Skyforce
- 2002–2003: Idaho Stampede
- 2004: Florence Flyers
- 2004: Barangay Ginebra Kings
- 2004–2005: SKS Polphamra-Pakmet Starogard
- 2005–2006: Stal Ostrów Wielkopolski
- 2006–2007: Deutsche Bank Skyliners
- 2007–2012: AZS Koszalin

Career highlights
- 3× Polish Basketball League All-Star (2006, 2009, 2012); 2× Polish Basketball League All-Imports team (2005, 2011); Second-team All-Polish Basketball League (2011); Polish Cup champion (2010); Third-team all-Polish Basketball League (2009); Polish Basketball League All-Newcomers team (2005); Third-team All-Big Ten (2000); Second-team NJCAA All-American (1998)

George L. Reese (born May 8, 1977) is an American former professional basketball player. He attended The Ohio State University, where the Buckeyes went to the NCAA Final Four 1999, and won the Men's Big Ten Basketball Championship in 2000. Reese has played abroad, including France, Germany, Greece and Poland.

== Early life and college ==
Reese graduated from Independence High School at Columbus, Ohio in 1995. After graduating from high school, he attended the University of South Florida for one year. Under coach Bobby Paschal, Reese never played any games, so he transferred to Columbus State Community College the but still did not play basketball. He then transferred to John A. Logan College, a community college at Carterville, Illinois. In the 1997–98 season for Logan, Reese averaged 20.2 points and 11.6 rebounds per game and was a second-team NJCAA All-American.

From 1998 to 2000, Reese played small forward at Ohio State. He averaged 5.5 points, 4.3 rebounds, and 0.5 assists in 1998–99 then in his senior season 13.2 points, 5.7 rebounds, and 1.2 assists. He was a third-team All-Big Ten Conference pick in his senior year.

Daughter Aila Reese

== Professional career ==
Although Reese was not selected in the 2000 NBA draft, the Cincinnati Stuff of International Basketball League selected Reese in the 10th round (79th overall) in the 2000 IBL Draft. Reese professionally debuted in October 2000 with Hermine de Nantes Atlantique of the French Ligue Nationale de Basketball. In three games, he averaged 20 points and 10.7 rebounds. In November 2000, Reese signed with the Cincinnati Stuff. On April 14, 2001, Reese signed with the IBL's Trenton Shooting Stars but did not play for that team.

In the inaugural NBA Development League draft in 2001, the Columbus Riverdragons selected George Reese in the ninth round (68th overall). The Riverdragons traded Reese to the Asheville Altitude on January 14, 2002. With Columbus, Reese averaged 4.5 points and 1.9 rebounds in 22 games with 48.4% field goals made; with Asheville, Reese averaged 6.7 points, 2.9 rebounds, and 1.2 assists on 36.6% field goal shooting.

The next season, Reese played in two Continental Basketball Association teams: the Sioux Falls Skyforce (15 games: 9.7 points, 4.2 rebounds, 1.4 assists, 43.2% field goals made) and Idaho Stampede (14 games: 17.4 points, 5.9 rebounds, 1.7 assists, 1.1 steals, 56.2% field goals). Then in 2004, he played ten games with the Florence Flyers of the USBL. He also played with the Barangay Ginebra Kings of the Philippine Basketball Association.

Reese has played in the Polish Basketball League from 2004 to 2012, with the PBL team AZS Koszalin from 2007 to 2012.
