= Darrell Harris =

American basketball player (born 1984)

No. 34 – MKS Dąbrowa Górnicza
- Position: Center
- League: Polish Basketball League

Personal information
- Born: May 25, 1984 (age 42) Cleveland, Ohio, U.S.
- Listed height: 6 ft 9.75 in (2.08 m)
- Listed weight: 220 lb (100 kg)

Career information
- High school: East Cleveland (Cleveland, Ohio)
- College: Cuyahoga CC (2003–2005); Rhode Island (2005–2007)
- NBA draft: 2007: undrafted
- Playing career: 2007–present

Career history
- 2007–2008: Barreirense
- 2008–2009: Canarias
- 2009: Club Malvín
- 2009–2012: Kotwica Kołobrzeg
- 2012–2014: AZS Koszalin
- 2014–2015: King Wilki Morskie
- 2015: KAOD
- 2015–2016: Koroivos
- 2016–2017: AZS Koszalin
- 2017–2019: King Wilki Morskie
- 2019–present: MKS Dąbrowa Górnicza

Career highlights
- 2x PLK All-Star (2010, 2012); 3x PLK rebounding leader (2010–2012); PLK blocks leader (2011); Liga Portuguesa MVP (2008); Liga Portuguesa All-Star (2008)

Darrell Harris (born May 25, 1984) is an American professional basketball player for MKS Dąbrowa Górnicza of the Polish Basketball League (PLK). Standing at 2.05, he plays the center position. After two years at Rhode Island, Harris entered the 2007 NBA draft but was not selected in the draft's two rounds.

== Professional career ==
After going undrafted in the 2007 NBA draft, Harris played in several teams in Europe. Harris played from 2009 to 2012, for Kotwica Kołobrzeg. The next two years he spent in the AZS Koszalin. In 2015, he signed with Koroivos.

On June 19, 2016, Harris returned to AZS Koszalin after 2 years.

After spending two seasons with King Wilki Morskie, on July 20, 2019, he has signed with MKS Dąbrowa Górnicza of the Polish Basketball League (PLK).

== Personal life ==
Harris is married to a Polish woman.
