= Nikola Jovanović (basketball, born 1981) =

Serbian basketball player

Personal information
- Born: 7 March 1981 (age 45) Odžaci, SR Serbia, SFR Yugoslavia
- Listed height: 2.03 m (6 ft 8 in)
- Listed weight: 96 kg (212 lb)

Career information
- NBA draft: 2003: undrafted
- Playing career: 2001–2021
- Position: Power forward
- Number: 15

Career history
- 2003–2005: Mašinac
- 2005–2006: Ergonom Best
- 2006–2007: ETHA Engomis
- 2007–2008: Swisslion Takovo
- 2008–2009: Stal Ostrów Wielkopolski
- 2009–2011: Anwil Włocławek
- 2011–2012: Union Kavala
- 2012: Timișoara
- 2012: APOEL
- 2012–2013: Anwil Włocławek
- 2013–2014: KTE-Duna Aszfalt
- 2014–2016: CEP Lorient
- 2016: Vojvodina
- 2016–2018: Berck
- 2019–2021: Joker

Nikola Jovanović (Serbian Cyrillic: Никола Јовановић; born 7 March 1981) is a Serbian former professional basketball player.

== Playing career ==
Jovanović played professional basketball in Serbia (Mašinac, Ergonom Best, Swisslion Takovo, Vojvodina), Cyprus (ETHA Engomis, APOEL), Greece (Union Kavala), Poland (Stal Ostrów Wielkopolski and Anwil Włocławek), Romania (Timișoara), Hungary (KTE-Duna Aszfalt).

On November 25, 2016, Jovanović signed for the French team Berck.
