= Kamil Łączyński =

Polish basketball player (born 1989)

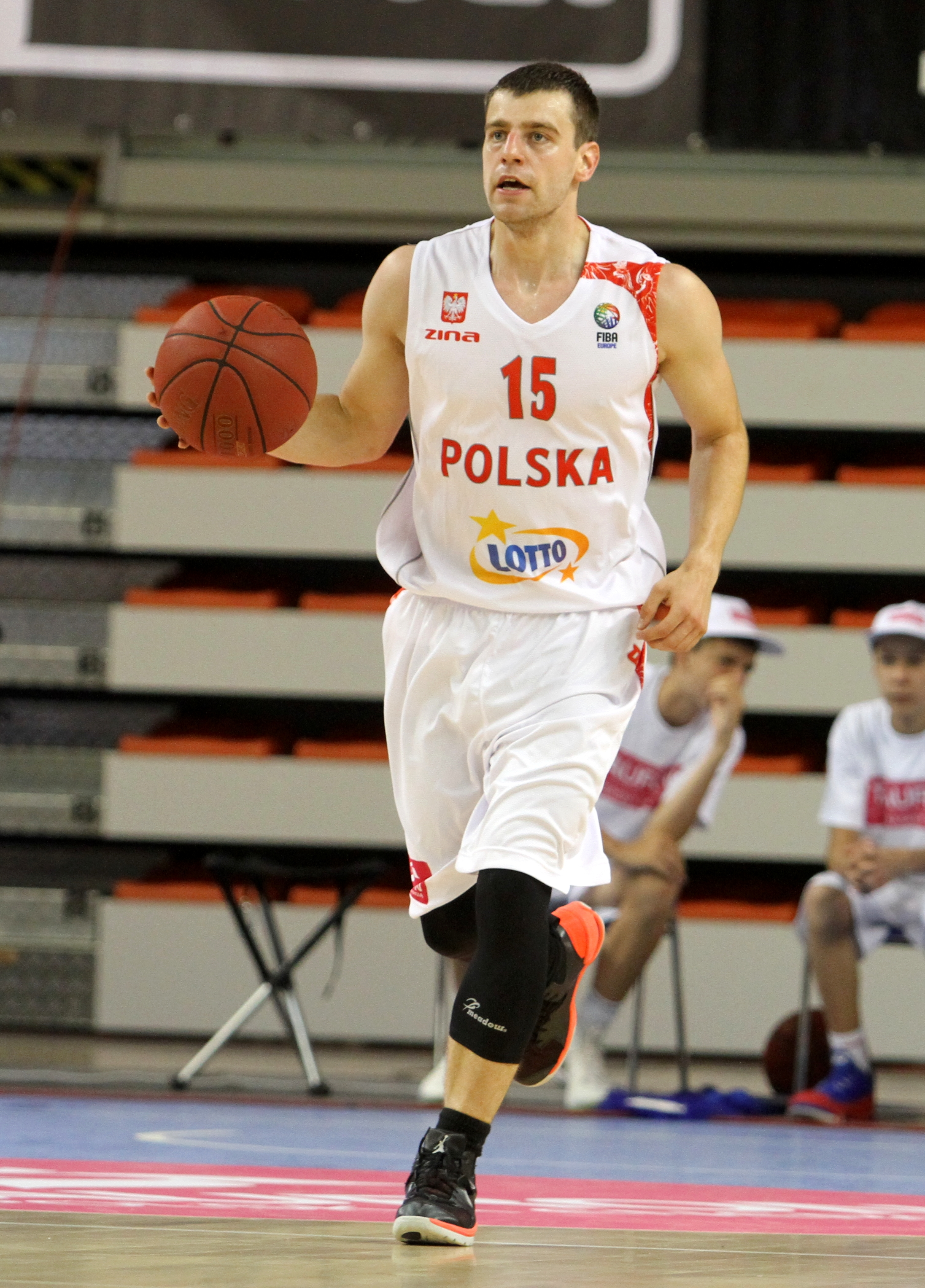
- Łączyński with Poland in 2014

No. 9 – AMW Arka Gdynia
- Position: Point guard
- League: PLK

Personal information
- Born: 17 April 1989 (age 37) Warsaw, Poland
- Listed height: 1.83 m (6 ft 0 in)

Career history
- 2005–2011: Polonia Warszawa
- 2011–2012: AZS Koszalin
- 2012–2013: Krosno
- 2013–2015: Rosa Radom
- 2015: Kutno
- 2015–2019: Anwil Włocławek
- 2019–2020: Śląsk Wrocław
- 2020–2021: Start Lublin
- 2021–2025: Anwil Włocławek
- 2025–present: Arka Gdynia

Career highlights
- FIBA Europe Cup champion (2023); PLK champion (2018); PLK Finals MVP (2018); Polish Supercup champion (2017); Champions League assists leader (2019)

Kamil Łączyński (born 17 April 1989) is a Polish basketball player for Arka Gdynia of the Polish Basketball League (PLK). Standing at 1.83 m (6 ft 0 in), he usually plays as point guard.

== Professional career ==
Łączyński started his career in 2005, with Polonia Warszawa. In the following years, he would play for AZS Koszalin, Rosa Radom and Kutno.

On 4 June 2018, Łączyński won his first PLK title with Włocławek, after defeating Stal Ostrów Wielkopolski 65–73 in Game 6 of the finals. He was named the PLK Finals MVP after averaging 10.8 points and 4.8 assists over the six games in the series.

On August 22, 2019, he signed with Śląsk Wrocław of the Polish Basketball League. Łączyński averaged 10.3 points and 6.4 assists per game. On September 2, 2020, he signed with Start Lublin.

On June 10, 2021, he has signed a 2-year contract with Anwil Włocławek for his return to club after 2 years.

On June 17, 2025, he signed with Arka Gdynia of the Polish Basketball League (PLK).
