= 2017–18 PLK season =

Energa Basket Liga
- Season: 2017–18
- Dates: 30 September 2017 – 4 June 2018
- Teams: 17

Regular season
- Top seed: Anwil Włocławek
- Season MVP: (Cape Verde) Ivan Almeida
- Relegated: Czarni Słupsk

Finals
- Champions: Anwil Włocławek (2nd title)
- Runners-up: BM Slam Stal Ostrów Wielkopolski
- Third place: Polski Cukier Toruń
- Fourth place: Stelmet Enea Zielona Góra
- Finals MVP: (Poland) Kamil Łączyński

Statistical leaders
Points	(United States) Anthony Beane	22.4
Rebounds	(United States) D.J. Shelton	10.1
Assists	(United States) Aaron Johnson	7.7

The 2017–18 Polish Basketball League (PLK) season, the Energa Basket Liga for sponsorship reasons, was the 84th season of the Polish Basketball League, the highest professional basketball league in Poland. The season started on 30 September 2017 and ended 4 June 2018. Anwil Włocławek won its second ever title in club history.

== Teams ==
Polfarmex Kutno and Siarka Tarnobrzeg were relegated to the I Liga after finishing in the 15th and 16th place in the 2016–17 PLK season. Legia Warsaw promoted to the PLK 15 years later, after winning the I Liga championship.

On July 28, 2017, the PLK announced it expanded the number of teams to 17 by giving a wild card to GTK Gliwice, the runner-up of the I Liga.

=== Locations and venues ===
Location of teams in 2017–18 Polish Basketball League

Team	Location	Arena	Capacity
Anwil Włocławek	Włocławek	Hala Mistrzów	4,200
Asseco Gdynia	Gdynia	Gdynia Sports Arena	5,500
AZS Koszalin	Koszalin	Hala Widowiskowo-Sportowa	3,000
BM Slam Stal Ostrów Wielkopolski	Ostrów Wielkopolski	Hala Sportowa Stal	1,200
Energa Czarni Słupsk	Słupsk	Hala Gryfia	3,200
GTK Gliwice	Gliwice	Centrum Sportowo-Kulturalne Łabędź	400
Legia Warsaw	Warsaw	OSiR Bemowo	1,000
Miasto Szkła Krosno	Krosno	MOSiR Krosno	1,380
MKS Dąbrowa Górnicza	Dąbrowa Górnicza	Centrum Hall	2,944
PGE Turów Zgorzelec	Zgorzelec	PGE Turów Arena	3,500
Polpharma Starogard Gdański	Starogard Gdański	Argo-Kociewie	2,500
Polski Cukier Toruń	Toruń	Arena Toruń	6,248
Rosa Radom	Radom	ZSE Radom	1,200
Stelmet Enea Zielona Góra	Zielona Góra	CRS Hall	6,080
TBV Start Lublin	Lublin	Hala Globus	5,000
Trefl Sopot	Sopot	Ergo Arena	15,000
Wilki Morskie Szczecin	Szczecin	Azoty Arena	7,403

== Regular season ==
=== League table ===
Pos	Team	Pld	W	L	PF	PA	PD	PCT	Qualification or relegation
1	Anwil Włocławek	32	24	8	2732	2366	+366	.750	Qualification to playoffs
2	BM Slam Stal Ostrów Wielkopolski	32	23	9	2586	2350	+236	.719	Qualification to playoffs
3	Polski Cukier Toruń	32	23	9	2730	2427	+303	.719	Qualification to playoffs
4	Stelmet Enea Zielona Góra	32	21	11	2738	2505	+233	.656	Qualification to playoffs
5	Rosa Radom	32	20	12	2659	2531	+128	.625	Qualification to playoffs
6	MKS Dąbrowa Górnicza	32	20	12	2642	2477	+165	.625	Qualification to playoffs
7	King Szczecin	32	18	14	2656	2583	+73	.563	Qualification to playoffs
8	PGE Turów Zgorzelec	32	18	14	2722	2707	+15	.563	Qualification to playoffs
9	TBV Start Lublin	32	17	15	2619	2588	+31	.531	
10	Trefl Sopot	32	17	15	2568	2519	+49	.531	
11	Asseco Gdynia	32	17	15	2607	2650	−43	.531	
12	Polpharma Starogard Gdański	32	15	17	2525	2575	−50	.469	
13	AZS Koszalin	32	11	21	2506	2756	−250	.344	
14	GTK Gliwice	32	10	22	2548	2756	−208	.313	
15	Miasto Szkła Krosno	32	8	24	2481	2711	−230	.250	
16	Legia Warsaw	32	5	27	2449	2823	−374	.156	
17	Czarni Słupsk (Note: On 31 January 2018, Czarni Słupsk retired from the league and was dissolved due to financial collapse.) (D)	32	5	27	1463	1907	−444	.156	Withdrew

Source: PLK
(D) Disqualified

== Playoffs ==
Quarterfinals and semifinals are played in a best-of-five format (2-2-1) while the finals in a best-of-seven one (2-2-1-1-1). The third place series are played in a double-legged format.

=== Bracket ===
Quarterfinals
1	Anwil Włocławek	3
8	PGE Turów Zgorzelec	0
4	Stelmet Enea Zielona Góra	3
5	Rosa Radom	1
2	Stal Ostrów Wielkopolski	3
7	King Szczecin	0
3	Polski Cukier Toruń	3
6	MKS Dąbrowa Górnicza	0

Semifinals
1	Anwil Włocławek	3
4	Stelmet Enea Zielona Góra	2
2	Stal Ostrów Wielkopolski	3
3	Polski Cukier Toruń	1

Finals
1	Anwil Włocławek	4
2	Stal Ostrów Wielkopolski	2
Third place
4	Stelmet Enea Zielona Góra	182
3	Polski Cukier Toruń	200

=== Quarterfinals ===
Team 1	Series	Team 2	Game 1	Game 2	Game 3	Game 4	Game 5
Anwil Włocławek	3–0	PGE Turów Zgorzelec	86–76	86–72	93–72		
BM Slam Stal Ostrów Wielkopolski	3–0	King Szczecin	78–71	88–79	91–73		
Polski Cukier Toruń	3–0	MKS Dąbrowa Górnicza	83–72	73–63	84–69		
Stelmet Enea Zielona Góra	3–1	Rosa Radom	104–97	86–94	71–60	93–83	

=== Semifinals ===
Team 1	Series	Team 2	Game 1	Game 2	Game 3	Game 4	Game 5
Anwil Włocławek	3–2	Stelmet Enea Zielona Góra	98–84	74–90	104–107	88–87	85–83
BM Slam Stal Ostrów Wielkopolski	3–1	Polski Cukier Toruń	82–76	82–71	78–84	92–78	

=== Third-place game ===
Team 1	Agg.	Team 2	1st leg	2nd leg
Stelmet Enea Zielona Góra	182–200	Polski Cukier Toruń	95–117	87–83

=== Final ===
Team 1	Series	Team 2	Game 1	Game 2	Game 3	Game 4	Game 5	Game 6	Game 7
Anwil Włocławek	4–2	BM Slam Stal Ostrów Wielkopolski	62–61	77–83	82–80	67–69	84–80	73–65	

== Awards ==
PLK Most Valuable Player

Player	Team	Ref.
(Cape Verde) Ivan Almeida	Anwil Włocławek	

PLK Finals MVP

Player	Team	Ref.
(Poland) Kamil Łączyński	Anwil Włocławek	

All-PLK Team

Player	Team	Ref.
(Cape Verde) Ivan Almeida	Anwil Włocławek	
(Poland) Aaron Cel	Polski Cukier Toruń	
(Poland) Michał Sokołowski	Rosa Radom	
(Montenegro) Vladimir Dragičević	Stelmet Zielona Góra	
(United States) Aaron Johnson	Stal Ostrów Wielkopolski	

== In European competitions ==
Club	Competition	Result	Ref
Stelmet Enea Zielona Góra	Champions League	Round of 16	
Rosa Radom	Champions League	Regular season	
Stal Ostrów Wielkopolski	FIBA Europe Cup	Second qualifying round	
