= Łukasz Seweryn =

Polish basketball player (born 1982)

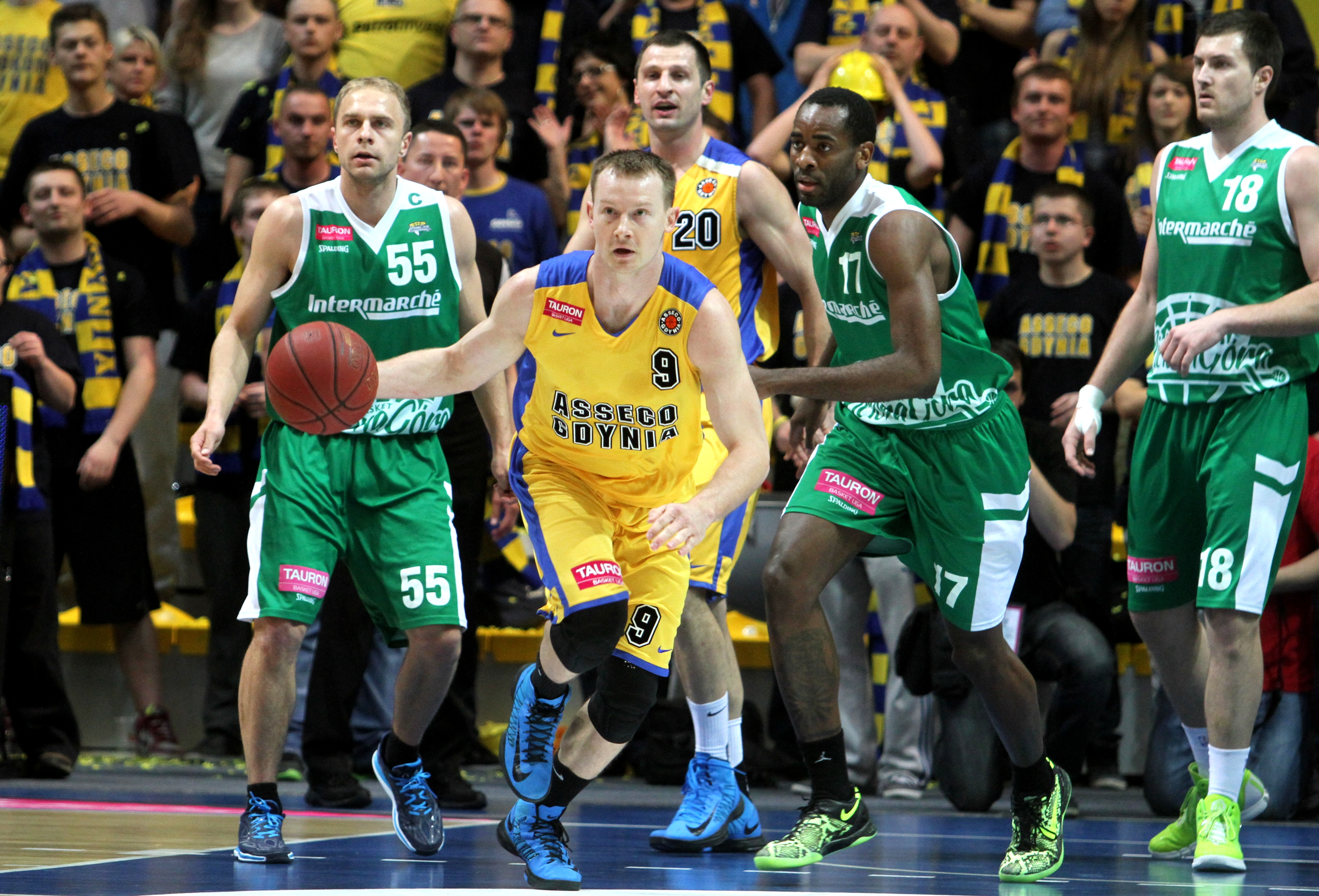

Personal information
- Born: October 26, 1982 (age 44) Poland
- Listed height: 6 ft 5 in (1.96 m)
- Listed weight: 196 lb (89 kg)

Career information
- Playing career: 2003–present
- Position: Guard / forward

Career history
- 2003–2004: Unia Wisła Paged Kraków
- 2004–2006: Czarni Słupsk
- 2006: Unia Tarnów
- 2006–2007: AZS Koszalin
- 2007–2008: Polpak Świecie
- 2018–2009: Stal Ostrów Wielkopolski
- 2009–2012: Asseco Gdynia
- 2012–2013: KK Włocławek
- 2013: Basket Zielona Góra
- 2013–2014: Asseco Gdynia
- 2014–2019: Czarni Słupsk

Łukasz Seweryn (born 26 October 1982) is a Polish professional basketball player who last played for Czarni Słupsk in the Polish Basketball League (PLK). He is 1.96 metres (6 ft 5 in) in height and plays at both the shooting guard and small forward positions. He is known for his three-point shooting.

== Professional career ==
In June 2014, Seweryn signed a two-year contract with Czarni Słupsk, returning to the team for a third stint.

== Personal life ==
Seweryn and his wife Natalia own a small chain of resort holiday homes in northern Poland, 600 meters from the coast.

== Honours ==
=== Club ===
Asseco Gdynia

- Polish Basketball League: 2010, 2011, 2012

Basket Zielona Góra

- Polish Basketball League: 2013
