= Jakub Garbacz =

Polish basketball player (born 1994)

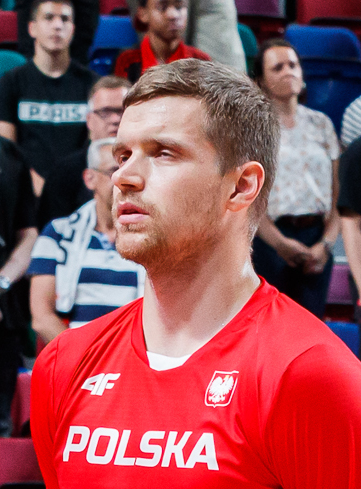
- Garbacz in 2022

No. 30 – AMW Arka Gdynia
- Position: Shooting guard / small forward
- League: PLK

Personal information
- Born: 17 March 1994 (age 32) Radom, Poland
- Listed height: 1.97 m (6 ft 6 in)

Career information
- Playing career: 2010–present

Career history
- 2010–2013: SMS Władysławowo
- 2012–2013: Kutno
- 2013–2015: GKS Tychy
- 2015–2017: Wilki Morskie Szczecin
- 2017–2019: Arka Gdynia
- 2019–2021: Stal Ostrów Wielkopolski
- 2021: Mitteldeutscher BC
- 2021–2023: Stal Ostrów Wielkopolski
- 2023–2024: Anwil Włocławek
- 2024–present: Arka Gdynia

Career highlights
- ENBL winner (2023); Polish Supercup winner (2022); Polish Cup MVP (2022); PLK champion (2021); PLK Finals MVP (2021); PLK Best Polish Player (2021); 2× Polish Cup winner (2019, 2022)

Jakub Garbacz (born 17 March 1994) is a Polish basketball player for Arka Gdynia of the Polish Basketball League (PLK). He also plays for the Polish national team.

== Professional career ==
Garbacz was named the PLK Finals MVP in 2021, after leading Stal Ostrów Wielkopolski to its first PLK title.

In the following offseason, he signed in Germany with Mitteldeutscher BC. He averaged 11.9 points and 2.1 rebounds per game. Garbacz signed with Stal Ostrów Wielkopolski on 31 December.

On 16 June 2023 he signed with Anwil Włocławek of the Polish Basketball League.

On 1 July 2024 he signed with Arka Gdynia of the Polish Basketball League (PLK).
