= 2013–14 PLK season =

Tauron Basket Liga^{1}
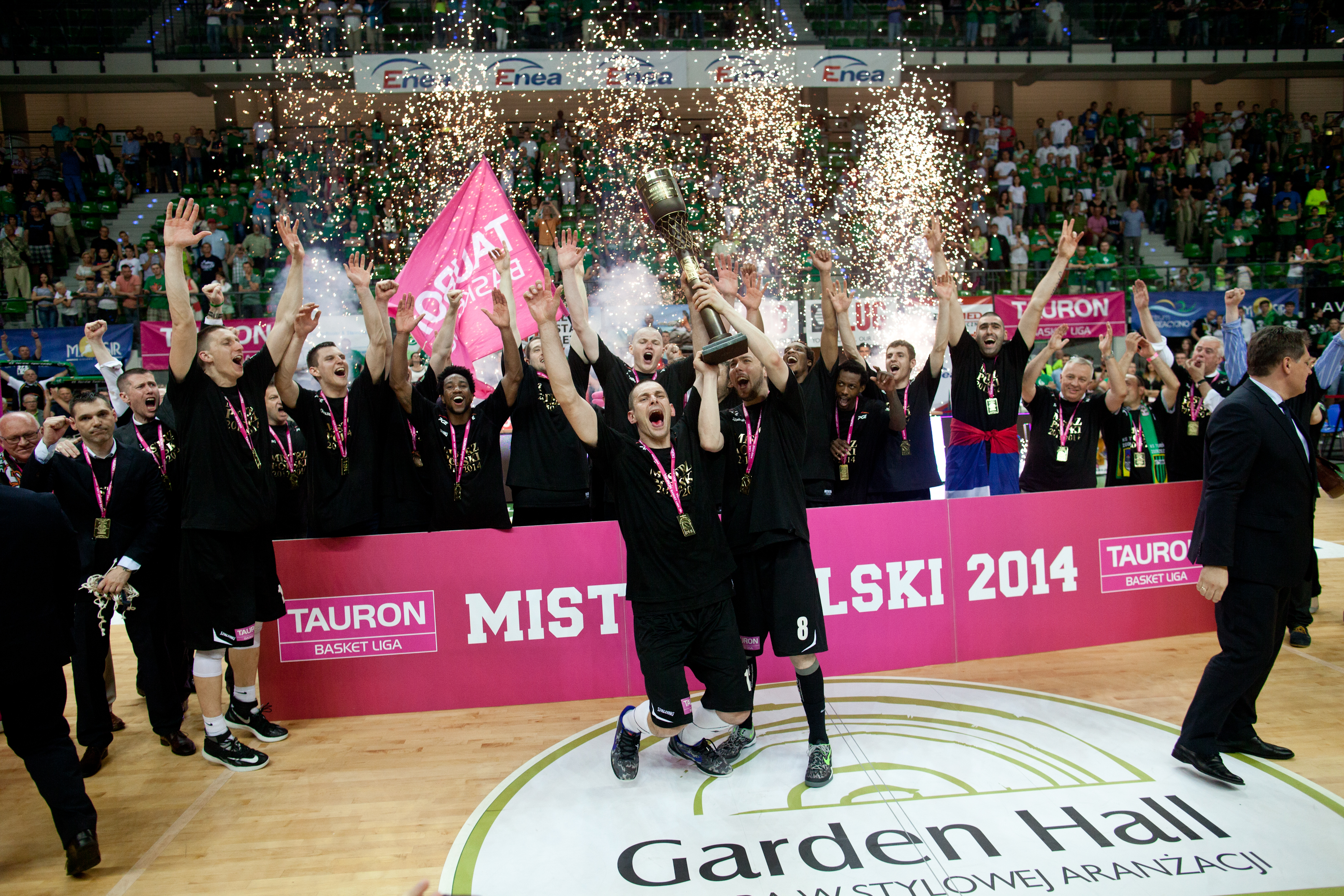
- Turów Zgorzelec celebrating after winning the title
- Teams: 12

Regular season
- Season MVP: (United States) J.P. Prince

Finals
- Champions: PGE Turów Zgorzelec; 1st title
- Runners-up: Stelmet Zielona Góra
- Third place: Trefl Sopot
- Fourth place: Rosa Radom
- Finals MVP: (Poland) Filip Dylewicz

Statistical leaders
Points	(Lithuania) Deividas Dulkys	16.4
Rebounds	(United States) Kevin Johnson Jr.	11.6
Assists	(Poland) Łukasz Koszarek	6.8

Records
- Highest scoring: (United States) LaceDarius Dunn (40)
- Highest attendance: Stelmet Zielona Góra (av. 3,375)
- Lowest attendance: Kotwica Kołobrzeg (av. 581)
- Average attendance: 1,741
- ^{1} Sponsored league name, referring to Tauron.

The 2013–14 Polish Basketball League – for sponsorship reasons the Tauron Basket Liga – was the 80th season of the highest professional basketball league in Poland and the 18th since the foundation of the Polish Basketball League. PGE Turów Zgorzelec won the Polish national title for the first time in franchise history.

== Teams ==
Colours	Team	Location	Stadium	Capacity
	WTK Anwil Włocławek	Włocławek	Hala Mistrzów	4,200
	AZS Koszalin	Koszalin	Hala Widowiskowo-Sportowa	3,000
	Asseco Gdynia	Gdynia	Gdynia Sports Arena	5,500
	PGE Turów Zgorzelec	Zgorzelec	Centrum Sportowe	1,300
	Rosa Radom	Radom	ZSE Radom	1,200
	Stelmet Zielona Góra	Zielona Góra	CRS Hall	6,080
	Trefl Sopot	Sopot	Ergo Arena	15,000
	Śląsk Wrocław	Wrocław	Hala Orbita	3,000
	Energa Czarni Słupsk	Słupsk	Hala Gryfia	3,200
	STABILL Lake Tarnobrzeg	Tarnobrzeg	Hala OSiR Wisła	1,500
	Kotwica Kołobrzeg	Kołobrzeg	Hala Millenium	1,306
	Polpharma Starogard Gdański	Gdański	Argo-Kociewie	2,500

== Standings ==
=== First round ===
Pos	Team	Pld	W	L	PF	PA	PD	Pts
1	PGE Turów Zgorzelec	22	18	4	1831	1636	+195	40
2	Stelmet Zielona Góra	22	17	5	1866	1634	+232	39
3	Trefl Sopot	22	16	6	1812	1634	+178	38
4	Anwil Włocławek	22	13	9	1699	1639	+60	35
5	Energa Czarni Słupsk	22	12	10	1655	1603	+52	34
6	Rosa Radom	22	12	10	1689	1669	+20	34
7	Asseco Gdynia	22	11	11	1565	1543	+22	33
8	Śląsk Wrocław	22	10	12	1679	1691	−12	32
9	AZS Koszalin	22	9	13	1691	1690	+1	31
10	Jezioro Tarnobrzeg	22	5	17	1661	1875	−214	27
11	Polpharma Starogard Gdański	22	5	17	1559	1840	−281	27
12	Kotwica Kołobrzeg	22	4	18	1606	1859	−253	26

=== Second round ===
Ranked 1–6
Pos	Team	Pld	W	L	PF	PA	PD	Pts
1	PGE Turów Zgorzelec	32	25	7	2696	2393	+303	57
2	Stelmet Zielona Góra	32	25	7	2700	2414	+286	57
3	Trefl Sopot	32	22	10	2647	2432	+215	54
4	Anwil Włocławek	30	16	14	2394	2445	−51	46
5	Rosa Radom	30	16	14	2443	2475	−32	46
6	Energa Czarni Słupsk	30	14	16	2391	2375	+16	44

Ranked 7–12
Pos	Team	Pld	W	L	PF	PA	PD	Pts
7	Asseco Gdynia	32	18	14	2352	2277	+75	50
8	AZS Koszalin	32	18	14	2499	2399	+100	50
9	Śląsk Wrocław	32	17	15	2521	2482	+39	49
10	Polpharma Starogard Gdański	32	10	22	2360	2642	−282	42
11	Jezioro Tarnobrzeg	32	7	25	2433	2673	−240	39
12	Kotwica Kołobrzeg	32	4	28	2280	2709	−429	36

== Playoffs ==
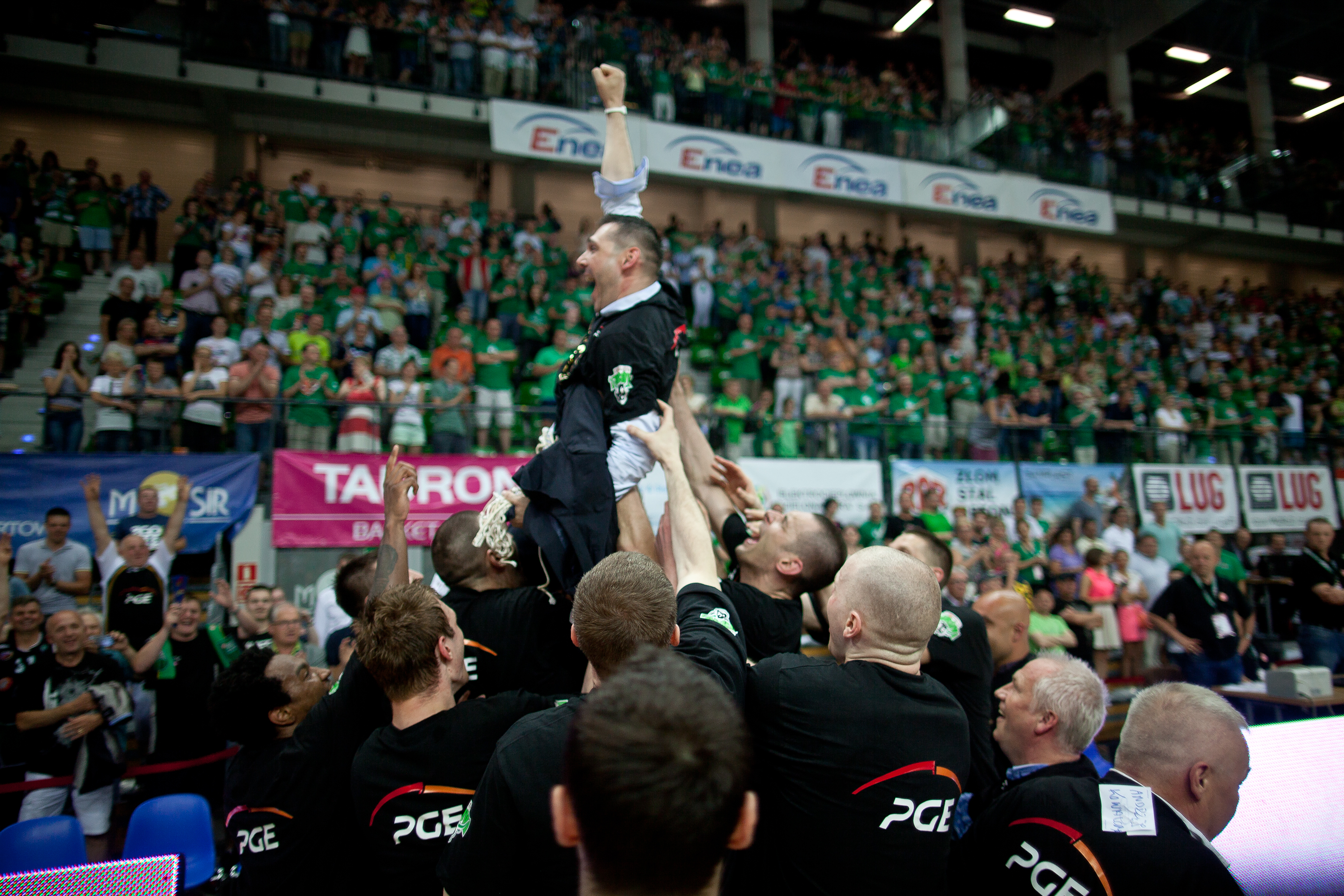
Turów celebrating after their first national championship

Quarterfinals
1	PGE Turów Zgorzelec	3
8	AZS Koszalin	0
4	Anwil	2
5	Rosa Radom	3
2	Stelmet Zielona Góra	3
7	Asseco Gdynia	1
3	Trefl Sopot	3
6	Energa Czarni Słupsk	2

Semifinals
1	PGE Turów Zgorzelec	3
5	Rosa Radom	0
2	Stelmet Zielona Góra	3
3	Trefl Sopot	2

Final
1	PGE Turów Zgorzelec	4
2	Stelmet Zielona Góra	2
Third place
3	Trefl Sopot	2
5	Rosa Radom	1

== Awards ==
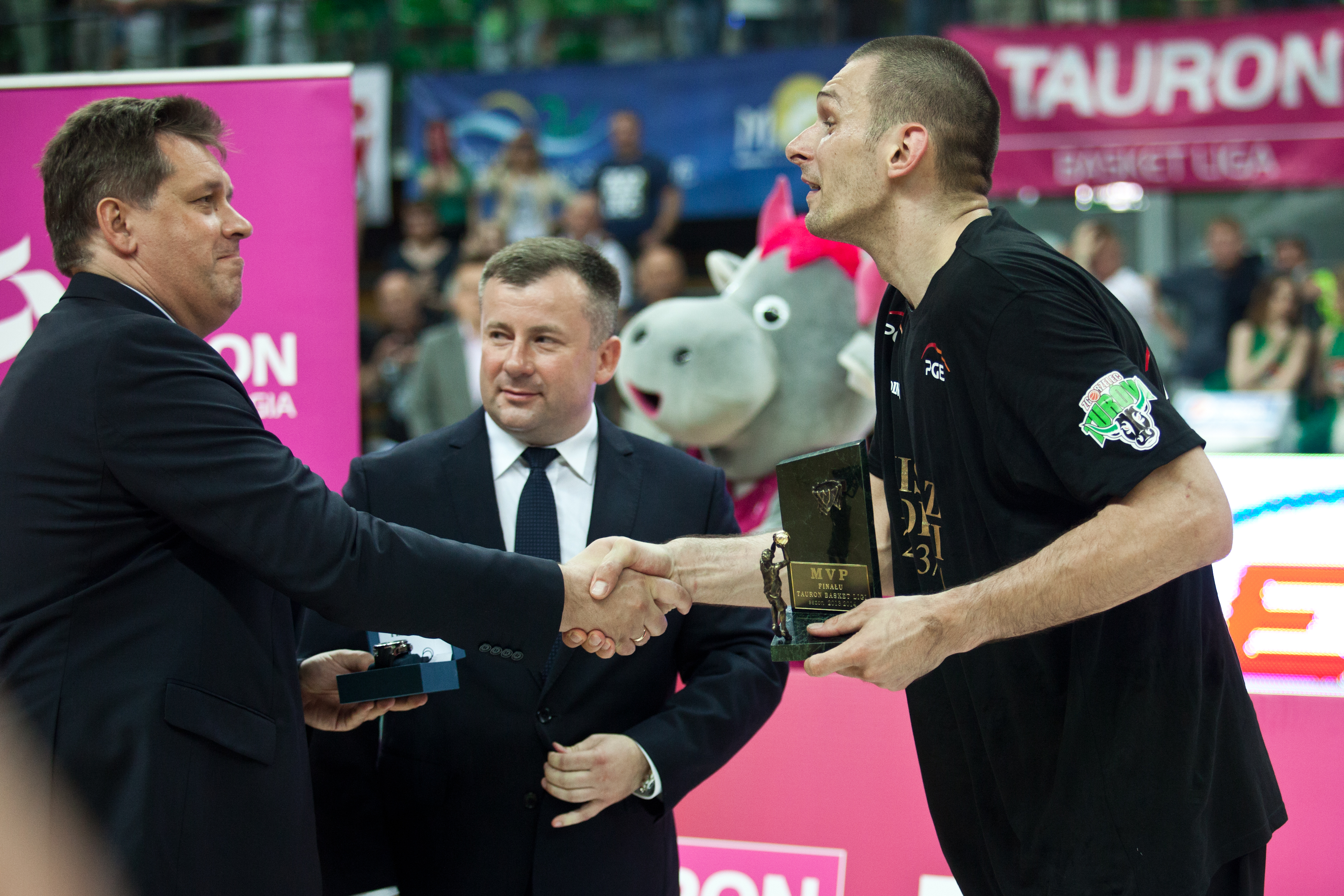
Filip Dylewicz receiving the Finals MVP Award

Award	Player	Team
Most Valuable Player	(United States) J.P. Prince	PGE Turów Zgorzelec
Finals Most Valuable Player	(Poland) Filip Dylewicz	PGE Turów Zgorzelec

== Polish clubs in European competitions ==
Team	Competition	Progress
Stelmet Zielona Gora	Euroleague	Regular season
Stelmet Zielona Gora	Eurocup	Top32

== Polish clubs in Regional competitions ==
Team	Competition	Progress
PGE Turow Zgorzelec	VTB United League	Regular season
