= Kirk Archibeque =

American basketball player (born 1984)

Los Angeles Sparks
- Position: Center

Personal information
- Born: September 27, 1984 (age 42) Durango, Colorado
- Listed height: 6 ft 9 in (2.06 m)
- Listed weight: 240 lb (109 kg)

Career information
- High school: Montezuma-Cortez (Cortez, Colorado)
- College: Northern Colorado (2004–2008); Fort Lewis (2008–2009)
- NBA draft: 2009: undrafted
- Playing career: 2009–present

Career history
- 2009–2010: Astrum Levice
- 2010–2011: Polpharma Starogard Gdanski
- 2011–2012: ŁKS Łódź
- 2011–2012: Zastal Zielona Gora
- 2012–2013: MIA Academy
- 2013–2014: Rosa Radom
- 2014–2015: Port of Antwerp Giants
- 2015–2016: Belfius Mons-Hainaut
- 2016–2017: PGE Turów

Career highlights
- Polish League rebounding leader (2016)

Kirk Archibeque (born September 27, 1984) is an American professional basketball player who last played for PGE Turów of the Polish Basketball League.

== Career ==
Archibeque started played basketball for the Montezuma-Cortez High School Panthers. During his college years he moved to the University of Northern Colorado where he played with the Bears in the Big Sky Conference. Between 2003 and 2008, he played 96 games for the team. For his final college year he moved to the Fort Lewis Skyhawks, playing 34 games.

After being undrafted in 2009, he started his professional career in Eastern Europe where he played for teams from Slovakia, Poland and Georgia. In 2014, he signed with Port of Antwerp Giants in Belgium.
