= PLK Finals MVP =

The PLK Finals MVP award is handed out to the best player in the Polish Basketball League Finals, the final series of the highest Polish basketball league.

== Winners ==
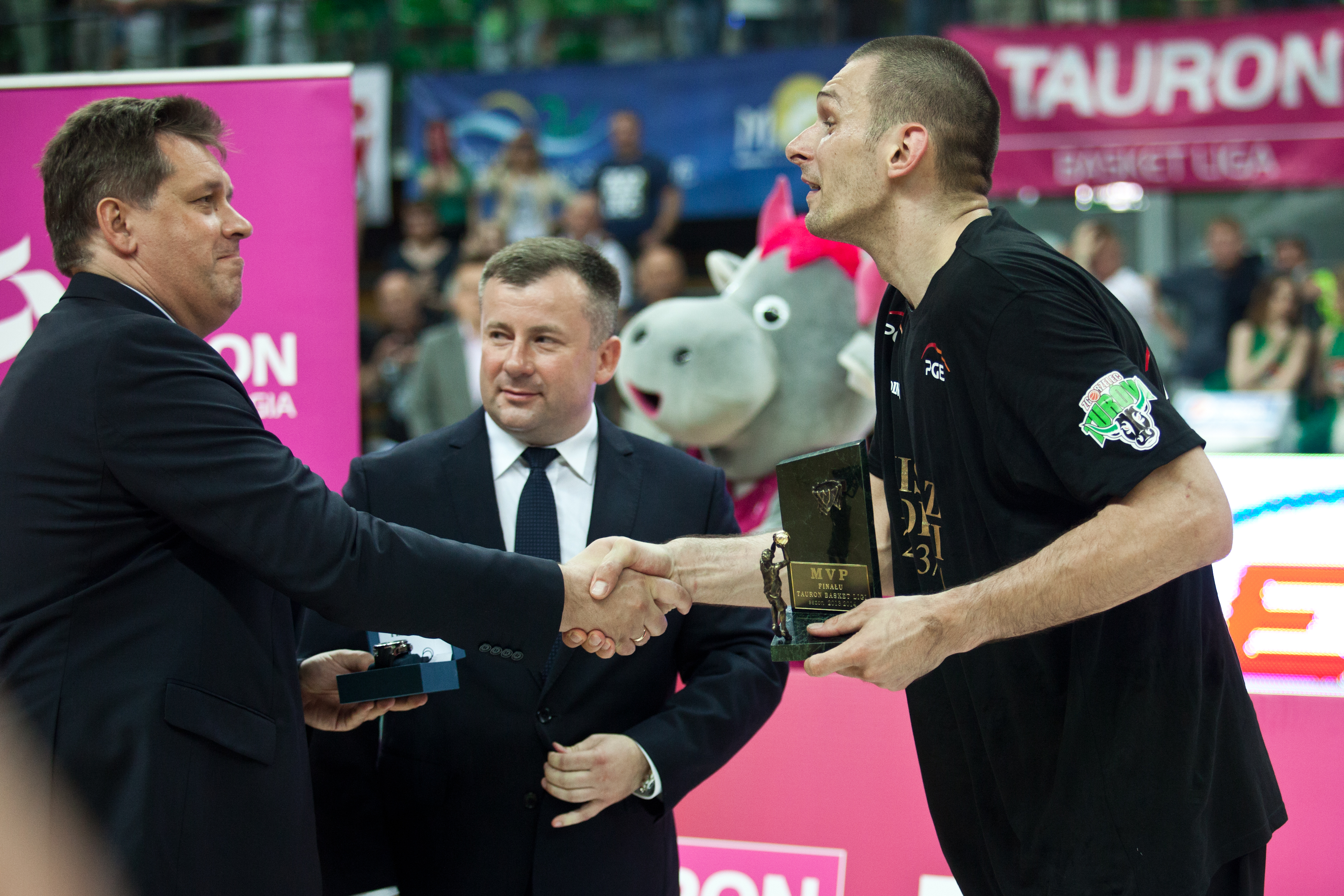
Filip Dylewicz receiving his award in 2014

Season	Player	Position	Nationality	Team	Ref
1997–98	Dominik Tomczyk	PF	Poland	Śląsk Wrocław	
1997–98	Adam Wójcik	C	Poland	Śląsk Wrocław (2)	
1998–99	Maciej Zieliński	SG	Poland	Śląsk Wrocław (3)	
1999–00	Charles O'Bannon	SG/SF	United States	Śląsk Wrocław (4)	
2000–01	Adam Wójcik (2×)	C	Poland	Śląsk Wrocław (5)	
2001–02	Michael Wright	PF	United States	Śląsk Wrocław (6)	
2002–03	Damir Krupalija	SF	Bosnia and Herzegovina	Anwil Włocławek	
2003–04	Tomas Pacesas	PG	Lithuania	Prokom Trefl Sopot	
2004–05	Adam Wójcik (3×)	C	Poland	Prokom Trefl Sopot (2)	
2005–06	Tomas Masiulis	PF	Lithuania	Prokom Trefl Sopot (3)	
2006–07	Donatas Slanina	PG	Lithuania	Prokom Trefl Sopot (4)	
2007–08	Filip Dylewicz	PF	Poland	Prokom Trefl Sopot (5)	
2008–09	Qyntel Woods	SF	United States	Prokom Trefl Sopot (6)	
2009–10	David Logan	PG	United States	Asseco Prokom Gdynia (7)	
2010–11	Daniel Ewing	SG	United States	Asseco Prokom Gdynia (8)	
2011–12	Jerel Blassingame	PG	United States	Asseco Prokom Gdynia (9)	
2012–13	Quinton Hosley	SF	Georgia	Stelmet Zielona Góra	
2013–14	Filip Dylewicz (2)	PF	Poland	PGE Turów Zgorzelec	
2014–15	Quinton Hosley (2)	SF	Georgia	Stelmet Zielona Góra (2)	
2015–16	Dee Bost	PG	United States	Stelmet Zielona Góra (3)	
2016–17	James Florence	PG	United States	Stelmet Zielona Góra (4)	
2017–18	Kamil Łączyński	PG	Poland	Anwil Włocławek (2)	
2018–19	Ivan Almeida	SF	Cape Verde; Portugal	Anwil Włocławek (3)	
2019–20	Not awarded ^{1}				
2020–21	Jakub Garbacz	SG	Poland	BM Slam Stal Ostrów Wielkopolski	
2021–22	Travis Trice	PG	United States	Śląsk Wrocław (7)	
2022–23	Bryce Brown	SG	United States	King Szczecin (1)	
2023–24	Jakub Schenk	PG	Poland	Trefl Sopot (1)	
2024–25	Kameron McGusty	SG	United States	Legia Warsaw (1)	
2025–26	Andrzej Pluta Jr.	PG	Poland	Legia Warsaw (2)	

^1 There was no awarding in the 2019–20, because the season was cancelled due to the coronavirus pandemic in Europe.

== Multiple honors ==
=== Player nationality ===
Rank	Country	Total
1.	Poland	12
2.	United States	11
3.	Lithuania	3
4.	Georgia	2
5.	Bosnia and Herzegovina	1
5.	Cape Verde	1

=== Teams ===
Rank	Team	Total
1.	Prokom Trefl Sopot / Arka Gdynia	9
2.	WKS Śląsk Wrocław	7
3.	Zastal Zielona Góra	4
4.	Anwil Włocławek	3
5.	Legia Warsaw	2
6.	PGE Turów Zgorzelec	1
6.	Stal Ostrów Wielkopolski	1
6.	King Szczecin	1
6.	Trefl Sopot	1
