= Polish Basketball Supercup =

- Organising body: Polish Basketball League
- Founded: 1999; 27 years ago
- First season: 1999
- Country: Poland
- Confederation: FIBA Europe
- Number of teams: 4
- Current champions: Legia Warsaw (1st title) (2026)
- Most championships: Anwil Włocławek; Śląsk Wrocław; Zastal Zielona Góra (3 titles)
- TV partners: Polsat Sport
- Website: www.plk.pl
- 2026 Polish Basketball Supercup

The Polish Basketball Supercup (Polish: "Superpuchar Polski w Koszykówce") is the supercup game of Polish men's top-tier level professional club basketball. Each season, the winner of the Polish League, plays against the winner of the Polish Cup, to cap off the new season. The first Polish Supercup game was played on 4 September 1999, and it was won by Śląsk Wrocław.

== Format changes ==
New format was introduced for the 2024 edition of Supercup. For the first time, as many as four teams compete for the basketball trophy - not only the champions and the Polish Cup winners but also the other two medalists of the Polish league from the recently concluded season.

== Matches ==
Polish Basketball Supercup winners
Year	Winner(s)	Score	Runners-up	Venue	City	MVP
1999	Śląsk Wrocław (1)	57–55	Znicz Pruszków (Note: As "Hoop Pekaes Pruszków".)	Hala Orbita (1)	Wrocław (1)	
2000	Śląsk Wrocław (2)	67–66	Prokom Trefl Sopot	Hala Orbita (2)	Wrocław (2)	
2001	Prokom Trefl Sopot (1)	101–74	Śląsk Wrocław	Hala Orbita (3)	Wrocław (3)	
2007	Anwil Włocławek (1)	103–100 (OT)	Prokom Trefl Sopot	Hala Mistrzów (1)	Włocławek (1)	
2010	Asseco Prokom Gdynia (2)	89–78	AZS Koszalin	Gdynia Sports Arena (1)	Gdynia (1)	
2011	Polpharma Starogard Gdański (1)	79–78	Asseco Prokom Gdynia	Gdynia Sports Arena (2)	Gdynia (2)	
2012	Trefl Sopot (1)	74–69	Asseco Prokom Gdynia	Gdynia Sports Arena (3)	Gdynia (3)	
2013	Trefl Sopot (2)	76–71	Stelmet Zielona Góra	CRS Hall Zielona Góra (1)	Zielona Góra (1)	(Lithuania) Šarūnas Vasiliauskas
2014	Turów Zgorzelec (1)	85–70	Śląsk Wrocław	PGE Turów Arena (1)	Zgorzelec (1)	(Poland) Michael Chyliński
2015	Stelmet Zielona Góra (1)	67–66	Rosa Radom	CRS Hall Zielona Góra (2)	Zielona Góra (2)	(Poland) Mateusz Ponitka
2016	Rosa Radom (1)	81–77	Stelmet Zielona Góra	CRS Hall Zielona Góra (3)	Zielona Góra (3)	(United States) Tyrone Brazelton
2017	Anwil Włocławek (2)	92–89 (OT)	Stelmet Zielona Góra	Hala Mistrzów (2)	Włocławek (2)	(Cape Verde) Ivan Almeida
2018	Twarde Pierniki Toruń (1)	72–68	Anwil Włocławek	Hala GOSiR (1)	Gniezno (1)	(Poland) Karol Gruszecki
2019	Anwil Włocławek (3)	95–66	Stal Ostrów Wielkopolski	Arena Kalisz (1)	Kalisz (1)	(Poland) Szymon Szewczyk
2020	Zastal Zielona Góra (2)	75–66	Anwil Włocławek	Arena Kalisz (2)	Kalisz (2)	(Poland) Łukasz Koszarek
2021	Zastal Zielona Góra (3)	84–69	BM Slam Stal Ostrów Wielkopolski	Aqua Zdrój (1)	Wałbrzych (1)	(Poland) Jarosław Zyskowski
2022	BM Slam Stal Ostrów Wielkopolski (1)	94–81	Śląsk Wrocław	Stegu Arena (1)	Opole (1)	(Poland) Damian Kulig
2023	King Szczecin (1)	92–90	Trefl Sopot	ArcelorMittal Park (1)	Sosnowiec (1)	(Poland) Kacper Borowski
2024	Śląsk Wrocław (3)	76–75	King Szczecin	Sports Hall RCS (1)	Radom (1)	(United States) Reggie Lynch
2025	PGE Start Lublin (1)	82–77	Energa Trefl Sopot	OSiR Bemowo (1)	Warsaw (1)	(United States) Tevin Mack
2026	Legia Warsaw (1)	110–96	Zastal Zielona Góra	ArcelorMittal Park (2)	Sosnowiec (2)	(United States) Devon Daniels

== Titles by team ==
Teams in italics are no longer active.

Club	Winners	Runners-up	Seasons won
Basket Zielona Góra	3	4	2015, 2020, 2021
Śląsk Wrocław	3	3	1999, 2000, 2024
Anwil Włocławek	3	2	2007, 2017, 2019
Asseco Arka Gdynia (Note: Arka Gdynia won its titles under the names "Prokom Trefl Sopot" and "Asseco Prokom Gdynia".)	2	4	2001, 2010
Trefl Sopot (Note: The Trefl Sopot team that was established in 2010.)	2	2	2012, 2013
Stal Ostrów Wielkopolski	1	2	2022
King Szczecin	1	1	2023
Rosa Radom	1	1	2016
Polpharma Starogard Gdański	1	–	2011
Turów Zgorzelec	1	–	2014
Twarde Pierniki Toruń	1	–	2018
Start Lublin	1	–	2025
Legia Warsaw	1	–	2026
Znicz Pruszków (Note: Znicz Pruszków was known as "Hoop Pekaes Pruszków" (1998–2000).)	–	1	–
AZS Koszalin	–	1	–

== See also ==
- Polish League
- Polish Cup
