= Szymon Szewczyk =

Polish basketball player (born 1982)

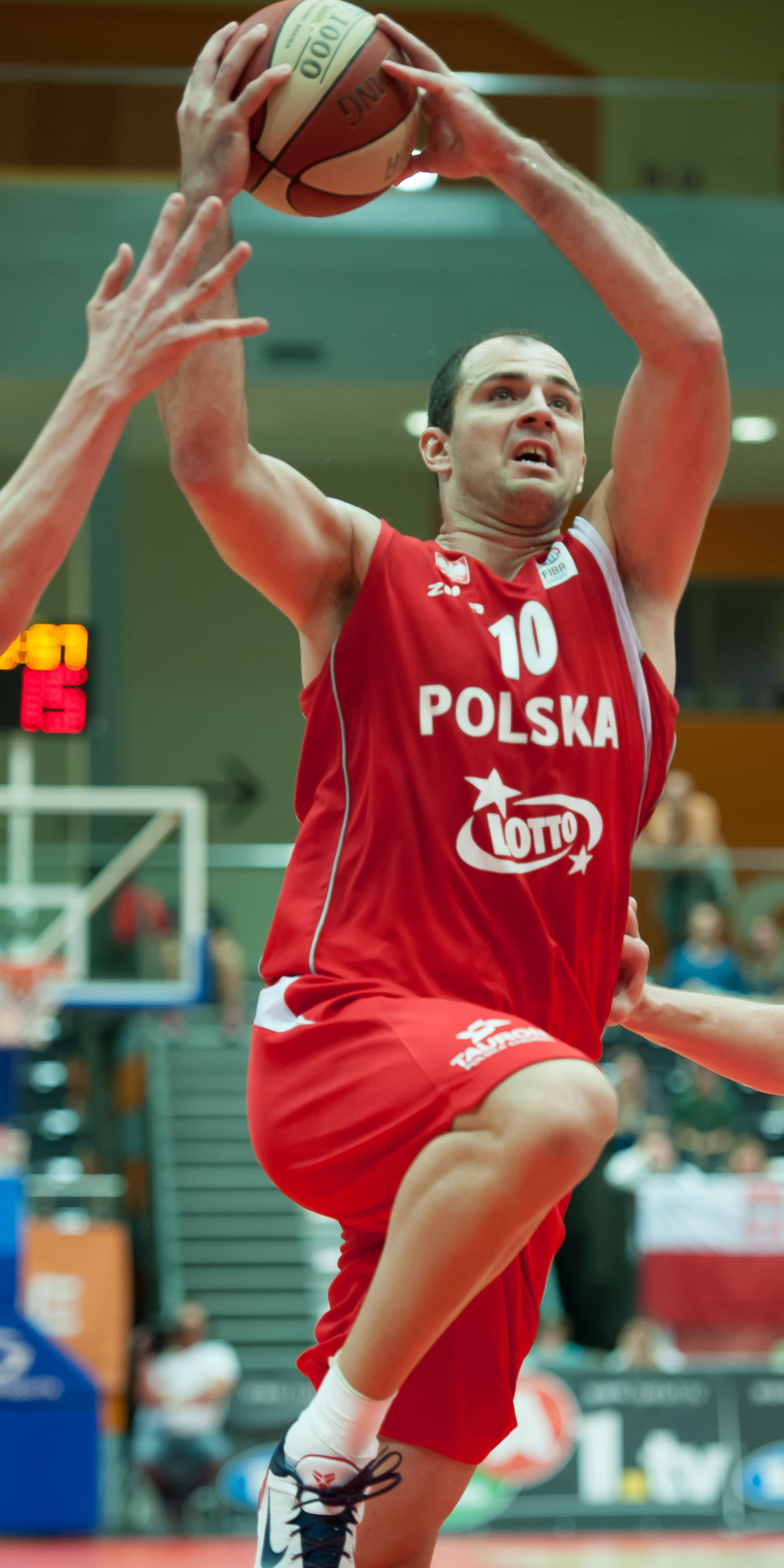
- Szymon Szewczyk 2014

Personal information
- Born: December 21, 1982 (age 43) Szczecin, Poland
- Listed height: 6 ft 9 in (2.06 m)
- Listed weight: 243 lb (110 kg)

Career information
- NBA draft: 2003: 2nd round, 35th overall pick
- Drafted by: Milwaukee Bucks
- Playing career: 1999–2022
- Position: Power forward / center

Career history
- 1999–2001: SKK Szczecin
- 2001–2002: Polpharma Starogard Gdański
- 2002–2003: TXU Energie Braunschweig
- 2003–2005: Alba Berlin
- 2005–2006: Union Olimpija
- 2006–2007: Scafati
- 2007–2009: Lokomotiv Rostov
- 2009–2011: Air Avellino
- 2011–2013: Reyer Venezia
- 2014: Virtus Roma
- 2014–2015: AZS Koszalin
- 2015–2016: Zielona Góra
- 2016–2017: Stal Ostrów Wielkopolski
- 2017–2020: Anwil Włocławek
- 2020–2021: GTK Gliwice
- 2021–2022: Anwil Włocławek

Career highlights
- ENBL champion (2022); 3× Polish League champion (2016, 2018, 2019); Slovenian League champion (2006); Slovenian Cup winner (2006); German League Rookie of the Year (2003)
- Stats at Basketball Reference

Szymon Szewczyk (born December 21, 1982) is a Polish former professional basketball player who last played for Anwil Włocławek of the PLK. of the Polish Basketball League (PLK). Standing at 6'9, he plays both the power forward and center positions.

== Career ==
After playing two successful seasons in his native Poland, Szewczyk was evaluated by several top teams in Europe before signing with Braunschweig of Germany's top division (Bundesliga I) for the 2002–03 season. Many considered him at the time as the best prospect from Poland in his age group.

=== National team ===
He has been a member of the Polish Junior National Team, the Polish Under-20 National Team and the Polish “B” National Team. He currently is a member of the Polish National Team.

=== Highlights ===
- 1999–2000: SKK Szczecin - In his first full season with Szczecin, Szewczyk averaged 13.1 points and 5.0 rebounds.
- 2000–2001: SKK Szczecin - Szewczyk improved his numbers across the board in his second season with Szczecin. Averaged 14.1 points, 7.4 rebounds and showed a three-point touch with 14 three-pointers (48.3%).
- 2001–2002: Polpharma Starogard Gdański
- 2002–2003: TXU Energie Braunschweig - Szewczyk delivered a very solid performance in his first season in Germany. Averaged 12.3 points, 6.3 rebounds and 1.07 blocked shots (4th in league). Erupted for 27 points (8-for-12 shooting from two-point range) and added seven rebounds vs. Trier. Posted a double-double with 11 points and 10 rebounds vs. Cologne. Scored 14 points and added five rebounds, four steals and three blocked shots in a win over X-Rays Würzburg.
- 2003–2005: Alba Berlin
- 2005–2006: Olimpija Ljubljana
- 2006–2007: Scafati Basket
- 2007–2009: Lokomotiv Rostov
- 2009–2011: Air Avellino
- 2011–2013: Reyer Venezia Mestre
- 2014: Pallacanestro Virtus Roma
- 2014–2015: AZS Koszalin
- 2015–2016: Basket Zielona Góra
- 2016–2017: BM Slam Ostrów Wielkopolski - Signed on September 23, 2016.
- 2017–2020: KK Włocławek
- 2020–2021: GTK Gliwice
- 2021–2022: KK Włocławek

=== NBA ===
On June 26, 2003, Szewczyk was selected by the Milwaukee Bucks with the 35th pick of the 2003 NBA draft. On 2009, he joined the Bucks for the Las Vegas Summer League.

On July 11, 2013, the Oklahoma City Thunder acquired Szewczyk's rights in a three team deal with Milwaukee and the Minnesota Timberwolves.

== Personal life ==
Born in Szczecin, Szewczyk grew up with PKK Szczecin's youth teams. His father Miroslaw Szewczyk was a professional basketball player for more than 20 years in Szczecin.
