= Jack Forrest (basketball) =

American basketball player (born 2000)

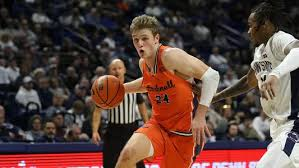

No. 24 – Anwil Włocławek
- Position: Small forward / shooting guard
- League: Polish Basketball League

Personal information
- Born: August 15, 2000 (age 26) Baltimore, Maryland, U.S.
- Listed height: 6 ft 5 in (1.96 m)
- Listed weight: 208 lb (94 kg)

Career information
- High school: Lower Merion (Ardmore, Pennsylvania)
- College: Columbia (2019–2020); Saint Joseph's (2020–2022); Bucknell (2022–2024)
- NBA draft: 2024: undrafted
- Playing career: 2024–present

Career history
- 2024–2025: Lavrio
- 2025–2026: Salon Vilpas Vikings
- 2026–present: Anwil Włocławek

Jack Forrest (born August 15, 2000) is an American professional basketball player, who currently plays for Anwil Włocławek of the Polish Basketball League (PLK). He played college basketball for the Columbia Lions, St. Joseph's Hawks, and Bucknell Bison.

== High school career ==
Forrest was a 2019 graduate of Lower Merion High School and was coached by Gregg Downer, the same high school coach for Kobe Bryant. As a senior he was named the Central League (PIAA) Most Valuable Player (MVP) and Third Team Pennsylvania All-State 6A. He was a two-time First Team All-Central League and three-time All-Main Line Team. He led Lower Merion to three Central League titles, three District 1 semifinal appearances, and an unbeaten season during league play as a senior. He recorded 1,209 career points, shot 44.3% from the 3-point range, and played AAU ball for Jersey Shore Warriors.

== College career ==
=== Columbia Lions ===
Jack attended Columbia University (2019–2020) for one year and appeared in 27 games with five starts as a freshman. He averaged 8.9 points and 3.3 rebounds per game. He scored 23 points on 10-for-15 shooting against Cornell, which earned him Ivy League Rookie of the Week honors. He was the team's third-leading scorer.

=== St. Joseph's Hawks ===
He transferred to Saint Joseph's University during the early phase of the COVID-19 pandemic, and played for the Hawks for two years (2020–2022). In 2020-2021 he averaged 10.4 points per game. He recorded 25 points at La Salle, had a team-high 18 points against Kansas, and had 15 in his debut against Auburn. Battling an injury, his 2021-2022 campaign was cut short, playing in 22 games.

=== Bucknell Bison ===
Forrest completed his collegiate career at Bucknell University (2022–2024), where he graduated with a degree in Economics. In the 2022–2023 season, following his return from injury at the start of the campaign, he averaged 10.1 points, 3.9 rebounds, and 1.5 assists across 22 games. In his final year at Bucknell, he started all 33 games, averaging 16.0 points, 5.2 rebounds, 1.5 assists in a league-high 36.1 minutes per game, and ranked 26th nationally in minutes per game. He scored a team-high 17 points at Duke, and a career high 27 at La Salle. Forrest finished his collegiate career with 1,216 total points. In 2024, he was a First Team All-Patriot League selection and was awarded the Patriot League Men's Basketball Scholar-Athlete of the Year.

== Professional career ==
On July 5, 2024, Forrest signed with Lavrio of the Greek Basketball League (GBL) to start his career as a professional basketball player. In the 2025–26 season, Forrest signed with Salon Vilpas Vikings of the Finnish Korisliiga.

On August 6, 2026, he signed with Anwil Włocławek of the Polish Basketball League (PLK).
