= Damir Krupalija =

Bosnian basketball player

Bosna Royal
- Title: Sporting director

Personal information
- Born: June 13, 1979 (age 47) Sarajevo, SFR Yugoslavia (now Bosnia and Herzegovina)
- Listed height: 6 ft 9 in (2.06 m)
- Listed weight: 232 lb (105 kg)

Career information
- High school: Boylan (Rockford, Illinois)
- College: Illinois (1998–2002)
- NBA draft: 2002: undrafted
- Playing career: 2002–2016
- Position: Small forward

Career history
- 2002–2003: Anwil Wloclawek
- 2003–2007: Spirou Charleroi
- 2007–2010: JDA Dijon
- 2010–2011: Hyères-Toulon
- 2011: Bilbao Basket
- 2013: Vogošća
- 2013–2014: Apollon Limassol
- 2014: Spirou Charleroi
- 2014: SLUC Nancy
- 2015: Bosna Royal
- 2015: Keravnos
- 2015–2016: Bosna Royal

Career highlights
- Polish League champion (2003); Polish League Finals MVP (2003); Belgian League champion (2004); French League All-Star (2009)

Damir Krupalija (born June 13, 1979) is a Bosnian-American professional basketball executive and former player. He played college basketball at University of Illinois at Urbana–Champaign.

== Early years ==
Krupalija fled his war-torn country in 1992, living in the Czech Republic for three years before coming to the United States in 1995. His parents, Sead and Zora Krupalija, joined him a year later.

== Career ==
After arriving in the United States, Krupalija attended Boylan Catholic High School in Rockford, Illinois, where he led the Titan basketball team to a fourth-place finish in the 1997 Illinois state tournament. In 1998, he was named an all-state selection by the Chicago Tribune and Associated Press. He was also named to the 1996 and 1997 State Farm Holiday Classic All-Tournament teams, and in 2003 was named to the Holiday Classic All-Quarter Century Team voted on by the fans.

After graduating from high school, Krupalija played basketball for the University of Illinois. Although his career at Illinois was often hampered by injuries, the 6'9" forward was well regarded for his rebounding ability and fiery attitude on the court. In his senior year (2001–2002), Krupalija, coming off the bench, was named as the Most Valuable Player at the Las Vegas Invitational Tournament.

In 2002, Krupalija moved to Poland, where he played forward for Anwil Wloclawek and won the 2002–03 Polish National Championship. The following season, he relocated to Belgium and joined Spirou Charleroi. They won the 2003–04 Belgian National Championship. He played for Spirou Charleroi until end of 2007 season.

For the 2010–11 season Krupalija signed for Hyères-Toulon Var Basket. In November 2011, he signs with Bilbao Basket for a month and a half. At the start of the 2013–14 season, he played for the Cypriot team Apollon Limassol BC.

On March 3, 2014 he returned to Spirou Charleroi, signing a contract for the rest of the season.

On June 5, 2014, he signed with SLUC Nancy Basket of the LNB Pro A for the 2014–15 season. In January 2015, he left Nancy and signed with KK Bosna Royal. He left Bosna after only three games and signed with Keravnos of Cyprus.
