= Luke Petrasek =

American basketball player

- Petrasek with Bilbao in 2026

No. 18 – Bilbao Basket
- Position: Forward
- League: Liga ACB; FIBA Europe Cup

Personal information
- Born: August 17, 1995 (age 31) East Northport, New York, U.S.
- Listed height: 6 ft 10 in (2.08 m)
- Listed weight: 215 lb (98 kg)

Career information
- High school: Northport (East Northport, New York)
- College: Columbia (2013–2017)
- NBA draft: 2017: undrafted
- Playing career: 2017–present

Career history
- 2017–2019: Greensboro Swarm
- 2019–2020: Gießen 46ers
- 2020–2021: Nizhny Novgorod
- 2021–2025: Anwil Włocławek
- 2025–present: Bilbao Basket

Career highlights
- 2× FIBA Europe Cup champion (2025, 2026); FIBA Europe Cup champion (2023); ENBL champion (2022); Second-team All-Ivy League (2017)
- Stats at Basketball Reference

Luke Petrasek (born August 17, 1995) is an American-born Polish professional basketball player for Bilbao Basket of the Liga ACB. He played college basketball for Columbia.

== Early life ==
Petrasek's grandfather Connie Simmons played for the New York Knicks from 1949 to 1954. Petrasek attended Northport High School, which he led to the 2013 Long Island Class AA Championship. He was a Newsday All-Long Island First Team honoree.

== College career ==
Petrasek immediately entered the starting lineup for Columbia and named was named Ivy League rookie of the week after scoring 20 points and blocking three shots in an 82–59 win over Fairleigh Dickinson on December 21, 2013. As a junior at Columbia, Petrasek averaged 10.2 points and 4.5 rebounds per game. Shooting 11-for-14 from the floor, Petrasek scored a career-high 31 points to lead Columbia to a 79–75 win over Cornell on January 20, 2017. Petrasek averaged 15.1 points, 5.6 rebounds and 1.9 assists per game as a senior. He earned second-team All-Ivy League honors. For his college career, he averaged 9.0 points, 4.1 rebounds and 1.3 assists per game.

== Professional career ==
=== Greensboro Swarm (2017–2019) ===
After not being chosen in the 2017 NBA draft, he was invited by the Charlotte Hornets to participate in the NBA Summer League and made the training camp roster. Petrasek was signed by the Greensboro Swarm of the NBA G League in October. He averaged 6.1 points and 4.4 rebounds per game in his first season with the Swarm. Petrasek was invited to play for the Hornets in the 2018 Summer League.

=== Gießen 46ers (2019–2020) ===
On July 18, 2019, Petrasek signed with the Gießen 46ers. He averaged 10.9 points, 4.4 rebounds and 1.2 assists per game.

=== Nizhny Novgorod (2020–2021) ===
On July 13, 2020, he has signed with Nizhny Novgorod of the VTB United League.

=== Anwil Włocławek (2021–2025) ===
On June 30, 2021, he has signed with Anwil Włocławek of the Polish Basketball League.

=== Bilbao Basket (2025–present) ===
On July 2, 2025, he signed with Bilbao Basket of the Liga ACB.

== National team career ==
In December 2023, Petrasek received Polish citizenship and became eligible to play for the Poland national team.
