= KK Włocławek =

Polish basketball club

Anwil Włocławek
- Nickname: Rottweilery (The Rottweilers)
- Leagues: PLK; ENBL
- Founded: 1990; 36 years ago
- History: Provide Włocławek; 1990–1992; Nobiles Włocławek; 1992–1999; Anwil Włocławek; 1999–present
- Arena: Hala Mistrzów
- Capacity: 3,963
- Location: Włocławek, Poland
- Team colors: Blue, White, Green
- Main sponsor: Anwil S.A.
- President: Hubert Hejman
- Head coach: Vedran Bosnić
- Team captain: Dawid Słupiński
- Ownership: Włocławek (67%); TKM Włocławek (33%)
- Championships: 3 Polish League; 4 Polish Cups; 3 Polish Supercups; 1 FIBA Europe Cup; 1 ENBL
- Retired numbers: 3 (10, 12, 33)
- Website: kkwloclawek.pl
Home	Away

Klub Koszykówki Włocławek (English: Basketball Club Włocławek), or known for sponsorship reasons as Anwil Włocławek, is a Polish professional basketball club, based in Włocławek, Poland. The team plays in the Polish Basketball League (PLK) and internationally in the European North Basketball League (ENBL). Their home arena is Hala Mistrzów.

The club has won the PLK championship three times, in 2003, 2018 and 2019. The club has also won four Polish Cup titles and three Polish Supercup titles. Anwil is the only Polish club in history to have won a European club competition, as they won the FIBA Europe Cup in 2023.

== History ==
=== 1990s: From Promotion to National Contender ===
The history of Anwil Włocławek began in the 1991–92 season, when the team, then competing under the name Provide Włocławek, secured promotion from Poland’s second division. What initially appeared to be a modest project soon developed into one of the biggest success stories in Polish basketball.

Ahead of its debut season in the top flight, the club gained a major sponsor, Nobiles, and adopted the name Nobiles Włocławek. Expectations were modest, but the newly promoted side quickly exceeded them. In its first season in the Polish Basketball League, the team reached the championship finals, earning a silver medal after losing to powerhouse Śląsk Wrocław. The achievement was no coincidence. In 1993–94, Nobiles once again advanced to the league finals and captured a second consecutive silver medal. A year later, the club added a bronze medal and won the Polish League Cup, firmly establishing itself among the country's leading basketball organizations.

During the second half of the decade, the club continued its steady development. Anwil became a regular playoff participant and one of the strongest challengers to the dominant teams of the era. The breakthrough came again in the 1998–99 season, when the club reached the Polish Championship Finals. In a memorable seven-game series against Śląsk Wrocław, the title was decided only in Game 7, with Anwil ultimately settling for another silver medal.

By the end of the 1990s, the club had transformed itself from a newly promoted team into a permanent member of Poland's basketball elite.

=== 2000s: The Road to the First Championship ===
The beginning of the new millennium saw Anwil become one of the strongest clubs in the country. The team won back-to-back silver medals in 2000 and 2001, emerging as one of the few organizations capable of challenging the growing dominance of Prokom Trefl Sopot. At the same time, the club began to make its mark in European competition. Anwil regularly competed in continental tournaments and recorded notable victories against teams from Lithuania, Croatia, Turkey, Russia and Israel.

One of the greatest achievements of that period came in the 2001–02 season, when Anwil advanced to the semifinals of the FIBA Saporta Cup. It remained the club's most significant international accomplishment for more than two decades, until the FIBA Europe Cup triumph in 2023.

Another milestone was the opening of Hala Mistrzów ("Hall of Champions") in 2001. The arena quickly became one of Poland’s best-known basketball venues and remains the club’s home court today.

The defining moment in club history arrived during the 2002–03 season. Led by head coach Andrej Urlep and a roster featuring Andrzej Pluta, Tomas Pacesas, Jeff Nordgaard, Armands Šķēle, Damir Krupalija and Igor Miličić, Anwil finally captured its first Polish Championship. After sweeping longtime rival Śląsk Wrocław 3–0 in the semifinals, Anwil defeated Prokom Trefl Sopot 4–2 in the championship series to secure the club's first league title. It represented the culmination of more than a decade of growth and development.

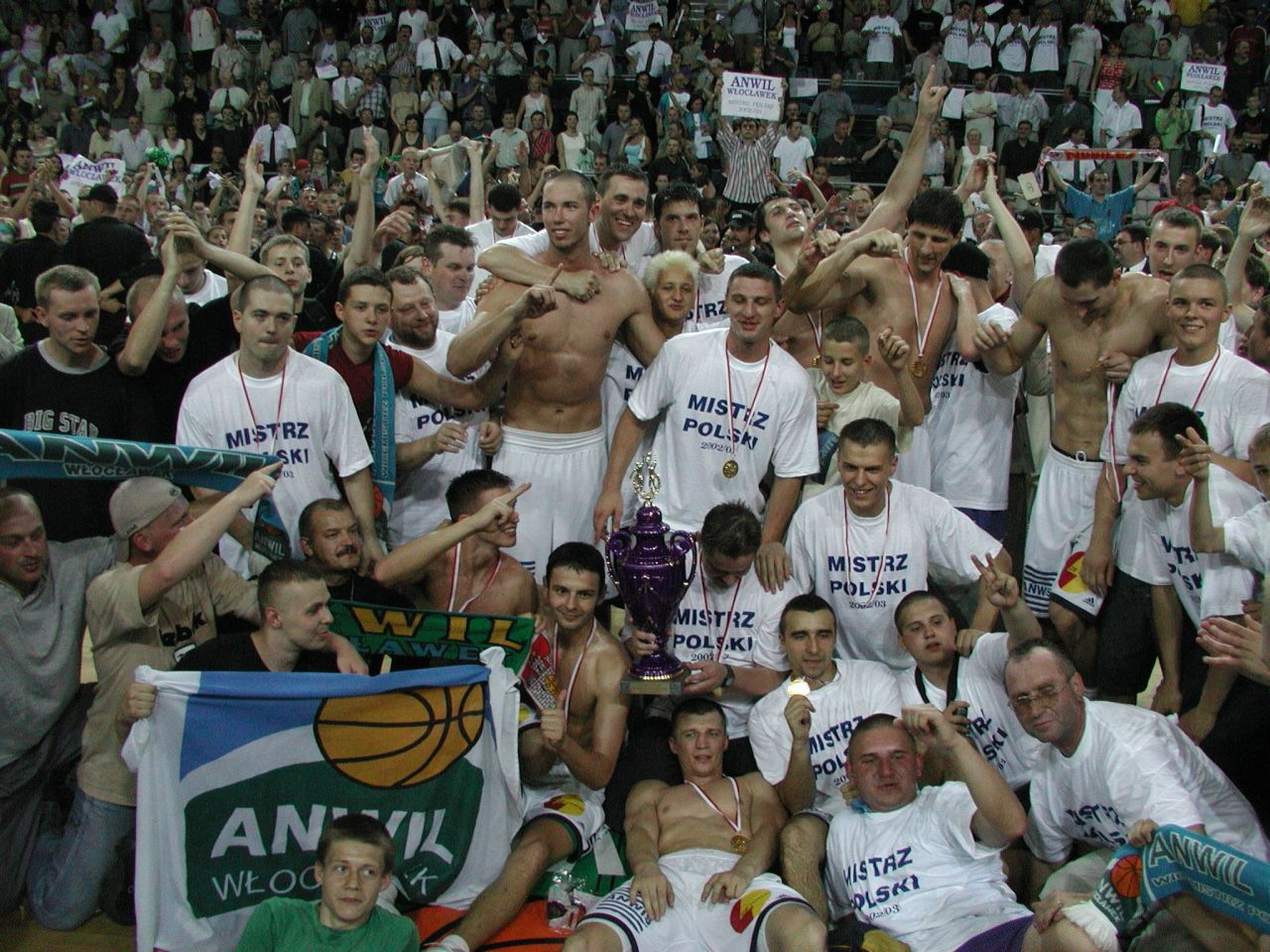
Anwil Włocławek celebrates 1st championship title in 2003

The years that followed were marked by continued success. Anwil remained among the country's top teams, regularly competing for medals and domestic trophies. The club won the Polish Cup in 2007 and added a bronze medal in 2008–09, signaling a return to the podium after several seasons without a medal. The following season proved even more successful, as Anwil reached the league finals and finished as runner-up in the 2009–10 campaign.

=== 2010s: Crisis, Rebuilding and Return to Glory ===
After several years among Poland’s elite, the early 2010s proved to be a period of transition for Anwil Włocławek. Although the club remained competitive and regularly qualified for the playoffs, it was unable to replicate the success of the previous decade. A fourth-place finish in 2012–13 highlighted the team’s potential, but frequent roster changes and injuries prevented it from mounting a serious championship challenge.

The following years brought increasing instability. In the 2013–14 season, Anwil spent much of the campaign near the top of the standings but suffered a painful quarterfinal defeat after losing a 2–0 series lead against Rosa Radom. The situation worsened in 2014–15. Despite multiple coaching and roster changes, the club finished 12th and failed to qualify for the playoffs for the first time since earning promotion to the top division in 1992.

A turning point came in the summer of 2015, when former Anwil player Igor Miličić was appointed head coach. The Croatian quickly rebuilt the team’s identity around intense defense, discipline and collective effort. Led by players such as Kamil Łączyński, David Jelínek and Fedor Dmitriev, Anwil returned to the upper half of the standings and finished fourth in 2015–16.

The following season marked another significant step forward. Strengthened by Josip Sobin, Paweł Leończyk and Nemanja Jaramaz, Anwil won the regular season for the first time in more than two decades. However, the playoffs ended in disappointment, as the top-seeded team was eliminated by Czarni Słupsk in the quarterfinals. Despite the setback, club officials remained committed to Miličić’s long-term project.

Their patience was rewarded in spectacular fashion during the 2017–18 season. Anwil opened the campaign by defeating Stelmet Zielona Góra to win the Polish SuperCup, ending an eleven-year wait for a major trophy. The team once again finished first in the regular season before entering one of the most memorable playoff runs in Polish basketball history. The defining moment came in the semifinals against defending champions Stelmet Zielona Góra. After four games, the series was tied 2–2. In Game 5, Anwil trailed by 19 points with just seven minutes remaining. Facing elimination, the team launched an extraordinary comeback fueled by aggressive full-court pressure and inspired performances from Ivan Almeida, Quinton Hosley, Kamil Łączyński and Josip Sobin. Anwil overturned the deficit and won 85–83, claiming the series 3–2 in what remains one of the greatest comebacks in Polish playoff history. The championship series against Stal Ostrów Wielkopolski was equally dramatic. After six hard-fought games, Anwil emerged victorious 4–2, securing its second Polish Championship and first league title in fifteen years. Kamil Łączyński, who averaged 10.8 points and 4.8 assists in the series, was named PLK Finals MVP.

The club successfully defended its crown in 2018–19. After sweeping Stal Ostrów Wielkopolski in the quarterfinals and rallying from a 0–2 deficit to defeat Arka Gdynia 3–2 in the semifinals, Anwil advanced to the first ever Polish Championship Final between clubs from the Kuyavian-Pomeranian region. The seven-game series against Polski Cukier Toruń became one of the most memorable finals in league history. Anwil fell behind 2–3 but responded with back-to-back victories, including an 89–77 win in Game 7 on Toruń’s home court. The triumph secured the club’s third Polish Championship and completed one of the most successful eras in its history.

By the end of the decade, Anwil had transformed itself from a team that missed the playoffs in 2015 into back-to-back national champions and one of the strongest basketball organizations in Poland.

=== 2020s: Domestic Success and European Triumph ===
The new decade began with high expectations. Fresh off back-to-back Polish Championships, Anwil entered the 2019–20 season determined not only to defend its domestic position but also to establish itself on the European stage. The club assembled one of the strongest rosters in its history, featuring former NBA players Tony Wroten and Ricky Ledo alongside established leaders such as Chase Simon and Shawn Jones. The season started successfully. Anwil captured the Polish Basketball Supercup by defeating Stal Ostrów Wielkopolski 95–66 and later added the Polish Cup, defeating Start Lublin, HydroTruck Radom and Polski Cukier Toruń in the Final Eight tournament. In the Basketball Champions League, the team recorded notable victories, including a memorable 100–90 home win over eventual champions San Pablo Burgos. However, the campaign came to an abrupt end in March 2020 when the COVID-19 pandemic forced the cancellation of the season. Anwil was officially classified in third place.

The following season proved far more difficult. Major roster changes, coaching changes and the challenges created by the pandemic led to one of the most disappointing campaigns in club history. Despite competing in FIBA Europe Cup, Anwil struggled domestically and finished the 2020–21 season outside the playoff positions for only the second time since joining Poland’s top division in 1992.

A rapid recovery followed. Under head coach Przemysław Frasunkiewicz, the club rebuilt around players such as Kamil Łączyński, James Bell, Luke Petrasek and Jonah Mathews. The 2021–22 season saw Anwil return to the top tier of Polish basketball. The team won the inaugural European North Basketball League (ENBL), capturing the club’s first international trophy, and later secured the bronze medal in the Polish Championship. While those achievements were significant, they would soon be overshadowed by an even greater success.

The 2022–23 season occupies a unique place in club history. Domestically, Anwil experienced an inconsistent campaign and entered the playoffs as the seventh seed. Although the team pushed eventual Polish champions King Szczecin to a decisive fifth game in the quarterfinals, it narrowly missed a place in the semifinals. The club’s European journey, however, became historic. Competing in the FIBA Europe Cup, Anwil advanced through both group stages before eliminating Turkish side Gaziantep in the quarterfinals. The semifinals brought another convincing performance against Finland’s Karhu Basket, with Anwil winning the first leg 90–71 before completing the job on the road. For the first time in club history, Anwil reached a European final. The opponent was French side Cholet Basket. In front of a packed Hala Mistrzów, Anwil won the first leg 81–77. A week later, the Polish side completed the mission by securing an 80–78 victory in France. Led by Phil Greene IV, who was named Finals MVP, Anwil lifted the FIBA Europe Cup trophy and became first Polish club to win a major European competition.

The following season demonstrated that the club remained among the strongest teams in Poland. Led by Victor Sanders, Amir Bell, Luke Petrasek and Kamil Łączyński, Anwil opened the 2023–24 campaign with thirteen consecutive victories, setting a new club record. The team finished first in the regular-season standings, while Sanders was named the Polish League MVP and Frasunkiewicz was voted Coach of the Year. Yet the playoff campaign ended in dramatic disappointment. After taking a 2–0 lead against Spójnia Stargard in the quarterfinals, Anwil lost three consecutive games and was eliminated despite holding home-court advantage throughout the series.

The 2024–25 season brought another fresh start under Turkish head coach Selçuk Ernak. Once again, Anwil finished first in the regular season and returned to the semifinals. The team advanced past local rivals Twarde Pierniki Toruń in the quarterfinals but was swept 3–0 by Legia Warsaw in the semifinals. A subsequent loss to Trefl Sopot in the bronze-medal series left the club in fourth place despite another strong regular season.

Even so, the first half of the 2020s confirmed Anwil’s position among Poland’s leading basketball organizations. The club added domestic trophies, won its first international title, repeatedly finished atop the regular-season standings and continued to compete for championships both at home and abroad.

== Evolution of the logo ==
The logo of the club features a rottweiler dog. The logo features a star in its logo for every PLK championship won.

== Honours ==
=== Domestic competitions ===
Polish Basketball League

- Winners (3): 2003, 2018, 2019
- Runners-up (8): 1993, 1994, 1999, 2000, 2001, 2005, 2006, 2010
- 3rd place (4): 1995, 2009, 2020, 2022
- Semifinals (7): 1996, 2002, 2004, 2007, 2013, 2016, 2025

Polish Basketball Cup

- Winners (4): 1995, 1996, 2007, 2020
- Runners-up (3): 2004, 2011, 2017

Polish Basketball Supercup

- Winners (3): 2007, 2017, 2019
- Runners-up (2): 2018, 2020

=== European competitions ===
FIBA Europe Cup

- Champions (1): 2022–23

Saporta Cup:

- Semifinals (1): 2002
- Quarterfinals (1): 2001

Korać Cup:

- Quarterfinals (1): 2000

European North Basketball League:

- Winners (1): 2022

== Season by season ==
Season	Tier	League	Pos	Polish Cup	Polish Supercup	European competitions		
1990–91	3	III Liga	1st	not held	not held	did not participate		
1991–92	2	II Liga	2nd	did not qualify	not held	did not participate		
1992–93	1	I Liga	2nd	not held	not held	did not participate		
1993–94	1	I Liga	2nd	not held	not held	2 FIBA European Cup	3R	3–1
1994–95	1	I Liga	3rd	Champion	not held	2 FIBA European Cup	QGS	7–9
1995–96	1	I Liga	4th	Champion	not held	2 FIBA European Cup	QGS	5–9
1996–97	1	I Liga	5th	Semifinal	not held	2 FIBA EuroCup	R16	8–6
1997–98	1	PLK	7th	Quarterfinal	not held	3 FIBA Korać Cup	R2	0–6
1998–99	1	PLK	2nd	Semifinal	not held	did not participate		
1999–00	1	PLK	2nd		did not qualify	3 FIBA Korać Cup	QF	8–4
2000–01	1	PLK	2nd		did not qualify	2 FIBA Saporta Cup	QF	11–3
2001–02	1	PLK	4th	not held	did not qualify	2 FIBA Saporta Cup	SF	7–9
2002–03	1	PLK	1st	not held	not held	3 FIBA Europe Champions Cup	GS2	10–4
2003–04	1	PLK	4th	Runner-up	not held	3 FIBA Europe League	R16	9–5
2004–05	1	PLK	2nd		not held	3 FIBA Europe League	QR	5–7
2005–06	1	PLK	2nd	Semifinal	not held	2 ULEB Cup	RS	3–7
2006–07	1	PLK	4th	Champion	not held	2 ULEB Cup	RS	3–7
2007–08	1	PLK	5th	Semifinal	Champion	2 ULEB Cup	RS	4–6
2008–09	1	PLK	3rd	Semifinal	not held	did not participate		
2009–10	1	PLK	2nd	Semifinal	not held	did not participate		
2010–11	1	PLK	6th	Runner-up	did not qualify	2 Eurocup Basketball	RS	1–5
2011–12	1	PLK	5th	Quarterfinal	did not qualify	R VTB United League	QR	1–3
2012–13	1	PLK	4th	Quarterfinal	did not qualify	did not participate		
2013–14	1	PLK	5th	Semifinal	did not qualify	did not participate		
2014–15	1	PLK	12th	did not qualify	did not qualify	did not participate		
2015–16	1	PLK	4th	Semifinal	did not qualify	did not participate		
2016–17	1	PLK	5th	Runner-up	did not qualify	did not participate		
2017–18	1	PLK	1st	Semifinal	Champion	did not participate		
2018–19	1	PLK	1st	Quarterfinal	Runner-up	3 Basketball Champions League	RS	4–10
2019–20	1	PLK	3rd (Note: Season curtailed due to the coronavirus pandemic.)	Champion	Champion	3 Basketball Champions League	RS	5–9
2020–21	1	PLK	13th	did not qualify	Runner-up	3 Basketball Champions League	QR1	0–1
2020–21	1	PLK	13th	did not qualify	Runner-up	4 FIBA Europe Cup	R16	1–2
2021–22	1	PLK	3rd	Quarterfinal	did not qualify	R European North Basketball League	C	7–0
2022–23	1	PLK	7th	Semifinal	did not qualify	4 FIBA Europe Cup	C	13–5
2023–24	1	PLK	5th	Semifinal	did not qualify	4 FIBA Europe Cup	RS	3–3
2024–25	1	PLK	4th	Semifinal	did not qualify	4 FIBA Europe Cup	R2	5–7
2025–26	1	PLK	9th	did not qualify	did not qualify	4 FIBA Europe Cup	RS	4–4

== Sponsorship naming ==
- Provide Włocławek (1991–1992)
- Nobiles Włocławek (1992–1996)
- Nobiles/Azoty Włocławek (1996–1997)
- Azoty/Nobiles Włocławek (1997)
- Anwil/Nobiles Włocławek (1997–1998)
- Nobiles/Anwil Włocławek (1998–1999)
- Anwil Włocławek (1999–present)

== Home arenas ==
- Hala OSiR (1991–2001)
- Hala Mistrzów (2001–present)

== Players ==
=== Retired numbers ===
Anwil Włocławek retired numbers
No.	Nat.	Player	Position	Tenure	Ceremony Date
10	(Poland)	Andrzej Pluta	SG	2002–03, 2006–2011	20 September 2011
12	(Belarus) (Poland)	Igor Griszczuk	G	1991–2002	16 September 2002
33	(Poland)	Szymon Szewczyk	C	2017–2020, 2021–2022	24 September 2023

=== Current roster ===
Note: Flags indicate national team eligibility at FIBA-sanctioned events. Players may hold other non-FIBA nationalities not displayed.

Anwil Włocławek roster
Players
Coaches

Pos.	No.	Nat.	Name	Ht.	Age
C	1	(Germany) (Poland)	Szczesko, Wiktor	2.08 m (6 ft 10 in)	18 – 20 January 2008
G	2	(United States)	Strong, Josiah (injured)	1.93 m (6 ft 4 in)	27 – 17 September 1999
G	4	(Poland)	Szlachetka, Mateusz	1.96 m (6 ft 5 in)	27 – 21 March 1999
C	5	(United States)	Freeman, Lennard	2.03 m (6 ft 8 in)	30 – 10 December 1995
SG	6	(United States Virgin Islands)	Edwin, Deon	1.91 m (6 ft 3 in)	34 – 9 October 1992
SG	7	(Poland)	Brenk, Adam	1.92 m (6 ft 4 in)	31 – 8 May 1995
SG	8	(United States)	Hines Jr., Samuel	1.98 m (6 ft 6 in)	24 – 26 March 2002
F/C	9	(Poland)	Wójcik, Szymon	2.08 m (6 ft 10 in)	27 – 11 November 1999
G	11	(Poland)	Łazarski, Bartosz	1.92 m (6 ft 4 in)	19 – 25 July 2007
C	16	(Poland)	Słupiński, Dawid (C)	2.06 m (6 ft 9 in)	34 – 16 April 1992
PG	20	(Belgium)	Lecomte, Manu	1.80 m (5 ft 11 in)	31 – 16 August 1995
SG	21	(Poland)	Pabijan, Kacper	1.96 m (6 ft 5 in)	19 – 1 February 2007
SG	24	(United States)	Forrest, Jack (injured)	1.96 m (6 ft 5 in)	26 – 15 August 2000

Head coach

- (Bosnia and Herzegovina) (Sweden) Vedran Bosnić

Assistant coach(es)

- (Poland) Marcin Woźniak
- (Bosnia and Herzegovina) Ahmet Pasalić

Athletic trainer(s)

- (Poland) Łukasz Orzechowski

Physiotherapist(s)

- (Poland) Marta Adamczak
- (Poland) Julia Baranowska

Team manager

- (Poland) Filip Brylski

Legend

- (C) Team captain
- Injured

- Roster
Updated: November 18, 2026

=== Depth chart ===
Pos.	Starting 5	Bench 1	Bench 2
C	Lennard Freeman	Dawid Słupiński	Wiktor Szczesko
PF	Szymon Wójcik
SF	Samuel Hines Jr.	Jack Forrest	Kacper Pabijan
SG	Mateusz Szlachetka	Adam Brenk	Josiah Strong
PG	Manu Lecomte	Deon Edwin	Bartosz Łazarski

=== Notable players ===
Note: Flags indicate national team eligibility at FIBA-sanctioned events. Players may hold other non-FIBA nationalities not displayed.

Criteria

To appear in this section a player must have either:

- Set a club record or won an individual award while at the club
- Played at least one official international match for their national team at any time
- Played at least one official NBA match at any time.

- (Poland) Zbigniew Białek
- (Poland) Jerzy Binkowski
- (Poland) Kamil Chanas
- (Poland) Michał Chyliński
- (Poland) Olek Czyż
- (Poland) Przemysław Frasunkiewicz
- (Poland) Michał Gabiński
- (Poland) Jakub Garbacz
- (Poland) Karol Gruszecki
- (Poland) Michał Ignerski
- (Poland) Łukasz Koszarek
- (Poland) Adam Łapeta
- (Poland) Kamil Łączyński
- (Poland) Michał Michalak
- (Poland) Jeff Nordgaard
- (Poland) Luke Petrasek
- (Poland) Andrzej Pluta
- (Poland) Andrzej Pluta Jr.
- (Poland) Hubert Radke
- (Poland) Łukasz Seweryn
- (Poland) Robert Skibniewski
- (Poland) A.J. Slaughter
- (Poland) Michał Sokołowski
- (Poland) Piotr Szczotka
- (Poland) Szymon Szewczyk
- (Poland) Krzysztof Szubarga
- (Poland) Przemysław Zamojski
- (Belgium) Manu Lecomte
- (Belgium) Hans Vanwijn
- (Belarus) Igor Griszczuk
- (Bosnia and Herzegovina) Damir Krupalija
- (Cape Verde) Ivan Almeida
- (Croatia) Ante Delaš
- (Croatia) Alan Gregov
- (Croatia) Vladimir Krstić
- (Croatia) Davor Marcelić
- (Croatia) Igor Miličić
- (Croatia) Josip Sobin
- (Czech Republic) David Jelínek
- (Czech Republic) Tomáš Kyzlink
- (Estonia) Janari Jõesaar
- (Georgia (country)) Quinton Hosley
- (Germany) Konrad Wysocki
- (United Kingdom) Kavell Bigby-Williams
- (United Kingdom) Luke Nelson
- (Haiti) Kervin Bristol
- (Iceland) Elvar Már Friðriksson
- (Israel) D'or Fischer
- (Italy) Andrea Crosariol
- (Kosovo) Dardan Berisha
- (Kosovo) Shawn Jones
- (Latvia) Jānis Blūms
- (Latvia) Rolands Freimanis
- (Latvia) Gatis Jahovičs
- (Latvia) Raimonds Miglinieks
- (Latvia) Armands Šķēle
- (Lithuania) Dainius Adomaitis
- (Lithuania) Deividas Dulkys
- (Lithuania) Gintaras Kadžiulis
- (Lithuania) Tomas Pačėsas
- (Lithuania) Donatas Zavackas
- (North Macedonia) Dušan Bocevski
- (Montenegro) Vladimir Mihailović
- (New Zealand) Mark Dickel
- (Nigeria) Chamberlain Oguchi
- (Palestine) Kyndall Dykes
- (Russia) Fedor Dmitriev
- (Russia) Evgeni Kisurin
- (Russia) Valery Likhodey
- (Serbia) Danilo Anđušić
- (Serbia) Nikola Jovanović
- (Serbia) Nikola Marković
- (Slovenia) Žiga Dimec
- (Slovenia) Goran Jagodnik
- (South Sudan) Emmanuel Akot
- (United States) Amir Bell
- (United States) Shaq Buchanan
- (United States) Joe Crispin
- (United States) Corsley Edwards
- (United States) Alton Ford
- (United States) D. J. Funderburk
- (United States) Lorinza Harrington
- (United States) Otis Hill
- (United States) Kris Lang
- (United States) Ricky Ledo
- (United States) Malcolm Mackey
- (United States) Jonah Mathews
- (United States) Ed O'Bannon
- (United States) Luke Petrasek
- (United States) Victor Sanders
- (United States) Brent Scott
- (United States) Casey Shaw
- (United States) Chase Simon
- (United States) Malik Williams
- (United States) Sharone Wright
- (United States) Tony Wroten
- (United States Virgin Islands) Deon Edwin

=== Individual awards ===
Award	Titles	Players
PLK Most Valuable Player	3	Igor Griszczuk (1993); Ivan Almeida (2018); Victor Sanders (2024)
PLK Finals MVP	3	Damir Krupalija (2003); Kamil Łączyński (2018); Ivan Almeida (2019)
PLK Top Scorer	3	Igor Griszczuk (1993); Deividas Dulkys (2014); Jonah Mathews (2022)
All-PLK Team	26	Igor Griszczuk (1993), (1995), (1996), (1999); Roman Olszewski (1993), (1994); Jerzy Binkowski (1994); Tomasz Jankowski (1997), (2000^{1}); Raimonds Miglinieks (2000^{1}); Dainius Adomaitis (2000^{1}); Roman Prawica (2001^{1}); Ed O'Bannon (2002^{1}); Andrzej Pluta (2003^{1}); Jeff Nordgaard (2003^{1}); Kris Lang (2003^{1}); Michał Ignerski (2006); Otis Hill (2007); Krzysztof Szubarga (2010); David Jelínek (2016); Nemanja Jaramaz (2017); Ivan Almeida (2018); Jonah Mathews (2022); Victor Sanders (2024); Michał Michalak (2025); D. J. Funderburk (2025)
PLK Best Defender	2	Krzysztof Szubarga (2013); Amir Bell (2024)
PLK Most Improved Player	1	Michał Sokołowski (2014)
PLK Best Polish Player	2	Krzysztof Szubarga (2010); Michał Michalak (2025)
PLK Best Coach	3	Igor Miličić (2017); Przemysław Frasunkiewicz (2024); Selçuk Ernak (2025)
Polish Basketball Cup MVP	2	Andrzej Pluta (2007); Shawn Jones (2020)
Polish Basketball Supercup MVP	2	Ivan Almeida (2017); Szymon Szewczyk (2019)
FIBA Europe Cup Final MVP	1	Phil Greene IV (2023)

^1 In the seasons 1999/2000 – 2002/2003, the best squads of Poles and foreigners were selected.

== Head coaches ==
- (Poland) Mirosław Noculak (1991–1992)
- (Poland) Szczepan Waczyński (1992–1993)
- (Poland) Wojciech Krajewski (1993–1996)
- (Poland) Jacek Gembal (1996)
- (Poland) Wojciech Kobielski (1996–1997)
- (Serbia) Rajko Toroman (1997)
- (Poland) Wojciech Kobielski (1997)
- (Poland) Eugeniusz Kijewski (1997–1999)
- (Croatia) Danijel Jusup (2000–2001)
- (Poland) Wojciech Kobielski (2001)
- (Serbia) Stevan Tot (2001)
- (Croatia) Aleksandar Petrović (2001–2002)
- (Slovenia) Andrej Urlep (2002–2006)
- (Slovenia) David Dedek (2006)
- (Slovenia) Aleš Pipan (2006–2008)
- (Slovenia) Zmago Sagadin (2008)
- (Belarus) (Poland) Igor Griszczuk (2008–2010)
- (Poland) Krzysztof Szablowski (2010)
- (Bosnia and Herzegovina) Emir Mutapčić (2010–2012)
- (Poland) Krzysztof Szablowski (2012)
- (Lithuania) Dainius Adomaitis (2012)
- (Serbia) Milija Bogićević (2012–2014)
- (Poland) Mariusz Niedbalski (2014)
- (Bosnia and Herzegovina) Predrag Krunić (2014–2015)
- (Poland) Marcin Woźniak (2015)
- (Croatia) (Poland) Igor Miličić (2015–2020)
- (Slovenia) Dejan Mihevc (2020)
- (Poland) Marcin Woźniak (2020–2021)
- (Poland) Przemysław Frasunkiewicz (2021–2024)
- (Turkey) Selçuk Ernak (2024–2025)
- (Poland) Grzegorz Kożan (2025)
- (Israel) (Czech Republic) Ronen Ginzburg (2025–2026)
- (Bosnia and Herzegovina) (Sweden) Vedran Bosnić (2026–present)
