= Amir Bell =

American professional basketball player

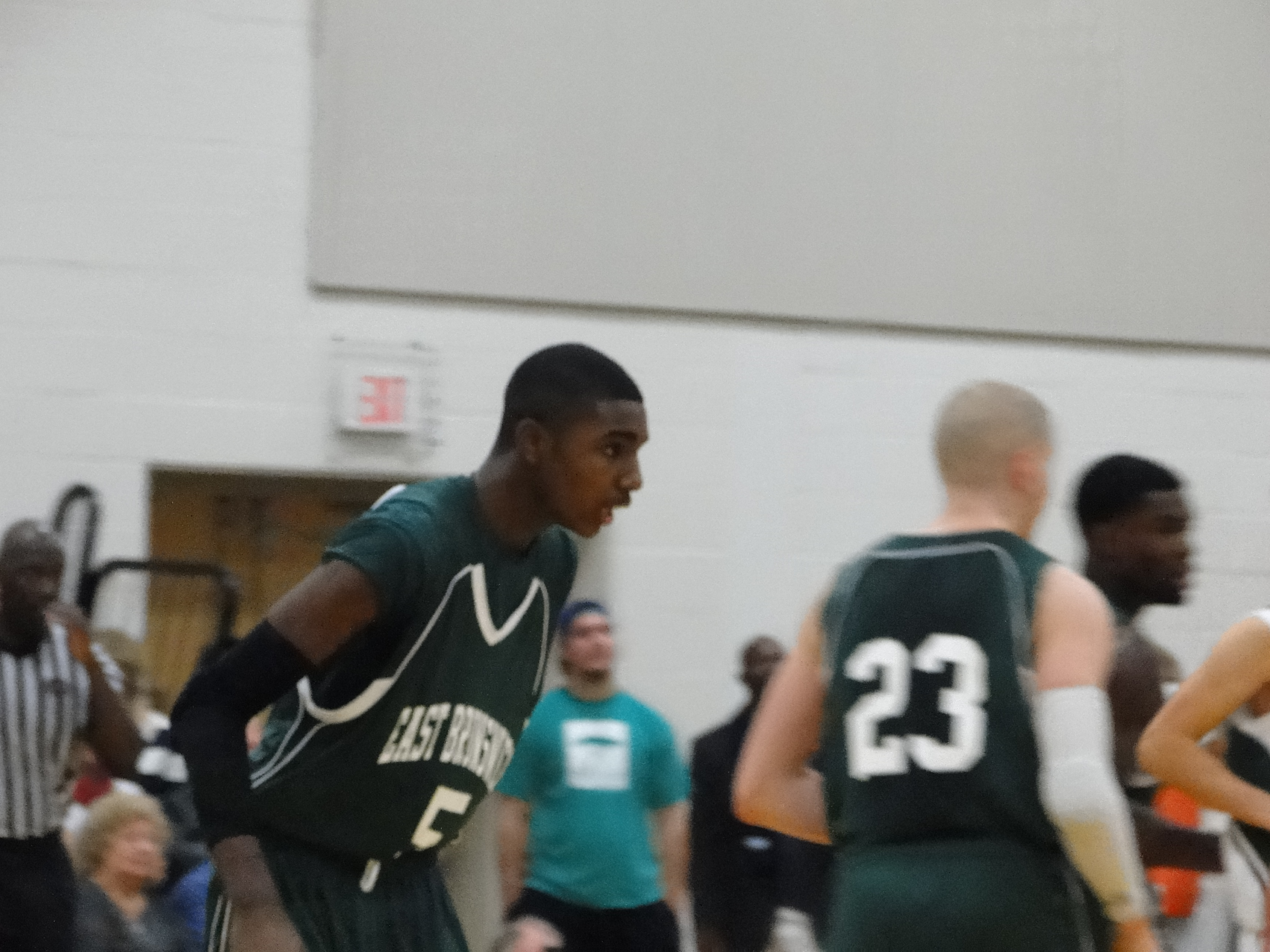
- Amir Bell in youth sports

Free agent
- Position: Guard

Personal information
- Born: May 21, 1996 (age 30) East Brunswick, New Jersey
- Listed height: 6 ft 4 in (1.93 m)
- Listed weight: 190 lb (86 kg)

Career information
- High school: East Brunswick (East Brunswick, New Jersey)
- College: Princeton (2014–2018)
- NBA draft: 2018: undrafted
- Playing career: 2018–present

Career history
- 2018–2019: Fortitudo Agrigento
- 2019–2020: KL Dragons
- 2020–2022: Hapoel Be'er Sheva
- 2022–2023: Brose Bamberg
- 2023–2024: Anwil Włocławek
- 2024–2025: AEK Larnaca B.C.

Career highlights
- PLK Best Defender (2024); Ivy League Defensive Player of the Year (2018)

Amir Bell (born May 21, 1996) is an American professional basketball player who last played for AEK Larnaca B.C. of the Cypriot Basketball League. He played college basketball for the Princeton Tigers. He plays the guard position.

== Early and personal life ==
Bell was born in Brick City and raised in East Brunswick, New Jersey. He is 6 ft 4 in (193 cm) tall, and weighs 190 pounds (86 kg).

He attended and played basketball at East Brunswick High School, where he was a three-star recruit according to ESPN.com as well as Yahoo! Sports’ Rivals.com. He was named All-Greater Middlesex Conference in 2013 and 2014.

== College career ==
Bell attended Princeton University, majoring in politics and playing basketball for the Princeton Tigers. In 2014–15 he was the only player on the team to start all 30 games, and his assist-to-turnover ratio of 1.6 was seventh-best in the Ivy League. Bell averaged 8.8 points, 2.6 assists and 3.0 rebounds while shooting 49.4 percent from the floor. In 2015–16 he started all 29 team on a team that finished 22–7 and reached the NIT, averaging 9.1 points and 2.5 rebounds per game. In 2016–17 he played in all 30 games. Bell averaged 6.6 points, 2.4 rebounds, and 2.0 assists per game as a junior. In 2017–18 he started all 29 games and was named the Ivy League Defensive Player of the Year, finishing second in the league in assist-to-turnover ratio (1.5), third in steals per game (1.4), and fourth in assists per game (3.7). Bell also averaged a career-high 10.9 points and 5.4 rebounds per game as a senior. He ended his Princeton career tied for fourth in career games played (118), and sixth in career assists (313), as well as 31st in scoring with 1,043 points.

== Professional career ==
In the 2018–19 season, Bell played for Italian team Moncada Agrigento in Serie A2 Basket League.

In the 2019–20 season, he played for the Kuala Lumpur Dragons in the ASEAN Basketball League, and in 17 games he averaged 15.8 points, 7.2 assists, and 7.2 rebounds per game.

In May 2020 Bell signed with Hapoel Be'er Sheva of the Israeli Basketball Premier League for the remainder of the winter league season with an option to extend the contract for another season. He averaged 9.2 points, 4.5 assists and 1.4 steals per game. On July 3, 2021, Bell re-signed with the team.

On June 22, 2022, he signed with Brose Bamberg of the Basketball Bundesliga.
