= Ivan Almeida =

Cape Verdean basketball player (born 1989)

Free Agent
- Position: Shooting guard / small forward

Personal information
- Born: 10 May 1989 (age 37) Praia, Cape Verde
- Listed height: 1.98 m (6 ft 6 in)
- Listed weight: 94 kg (207 lb)

Career information
- College: Stonehill (2009–2011)
- NBA draft: 2012: undrafted
- Playing career: 2011–present

Career history
- 2011–2012: Sampaense
- 2012: AD Bairro
- 2012–2013: Vitória de Guimarães
- 2013: AD Bairro
- 2013–2015: Lille Métropole
- 2015–2016: Chorale Roanne
- 2016–2017: Cholet
- 2017–2018: Włocławek
- 2018–2019: BC Kalev
- 2019: Włocławek
- 2019: Nymburk
- 2019: Galitos Barreiro
- 2020: Universo Treviso
- 2020: Ironi Nahariya
- 2020–2022: Włocławek
- 2021–2024: Benfica
- 2024: Sporting CP
- 2024: Al Ahli Tripoli
- 2024: Valtur Brindisi
- 2025: Juvi Cremona
- 2025: Kriol Star
- 2025: Al Ahli Tripoli
- 2025: Kriol Star
- 2026: Galitos Barreiro
- 2026: GTK Gliwice

Career highlights
- All-BAL Second Team (2025); BAL All-Defensive Second Team (2025); 2× PLK champion (2018, 2019); PLK Most Valuable Player (2018); PLK Finals MVP (2019); 3× Portuguese League champion (2022, 2023, 2024); 2× Portuguese Cup winner (2013, 2023); Portuguese League Cup winner (2024); Portuguese Supercup champion (2023); All-PLK Team (2018); Polish Supercup winner (2017); Polish Supercup MVP (2017); LNB Pro B Best Scorer (2015)
Medals
Men's basketball
Representing Cape Verde
Lusophony Games
Silver medal – second place	2009 Portugal	Team
Bronze medal – third place	2006 Macau	Team

Ivan Almeida (born 10 May 1989) is a Cape Verdean professional basketball player who last played for GTK Gliwice of the Polish Basketball League (PLK). Standing at 1.98 m (6' 6"), he usually plays as a small forward. Almeida represents the Cape Verde national team in international competitions. His brother, Joel, also plays professional basketball.

== Professional career ==
In August 2017, Almeida signed with Anwil Włocławek of the Polish Basketball League (PLK). In September 2017 he won the Polish SuperCup with Anwil Włocławek, winning over Stelmet Zielona Góra, 92–88. He scored 23 points in his debut and was named the Most Valuable Player of the game. In the following 2017–18 season, Almeida was named the PLK Most Valuable Player. Almeida averaged 17.2 points, 5.5 rebounds and 2.9 assists per game. He signed with Estonian club Kalev/Cramo on 24 August 2018.

On 8 October 2019, he has signed with ČEZ Nymburk of the NBL.

On 20 January 2020, he has signed with Universo Treviso Basket of the Italian Lega Basket Serie A (LBA).

The 2019–20 season in Italy was cancelled early due to the COVID-19 pandemic but in Israel it was restored and Almeida signed with Ironi Nahariya on 26 May 2020 for the end of the season. He averaged 14.9 points, 6.9 rebounds, 4.7 assists and 2.1 steals per game. On 15 September 2020, Almeida signed with Anwil Włocławek of the Polish Basketball League.

On February 22, 2022, he has signed with Benfica of the Liga Portuguesa de Basquetebol.

In October 2024, Almeida joined Libyan national champions Al Ahli Tripoli ahead of their participation in the Road to BAL.

On October 25, 2024, he signed with Valtur Brindisi of the Serie A2. In May 2025, Almeida played in the Basketball Africa League (BAL) with Kriol Star, a team from his native country that he co-founded with his brother Joel. He helped the team reach the playoffs, and was named to the BAL All-Defensive Second Team. On June 18, Almeida was named to the All-BAL Second Team. He averaged 13.8 points, 6.1 rebounds, 3.2 assists and 1.3 steals per game over the season.

In September 2025, Almeida played with Libyan club Al Ahli Tripoli at the 2025 FIBA Intercontinental Cup, where the team won a bronze medal, becoming the first African team in history to finish on the podium.

On January 27, 2026, he signed with GTK Gliwice of the Polish Basketball League (PLK).

== International career ==
Almeida played for Cape Verde's national basketball team on many occasions. At the 2015 AfroBasket, he recorded the most assists, steals and blocks for his team.
