= David Dedek =

Slovenian basketball coach (born 1971)

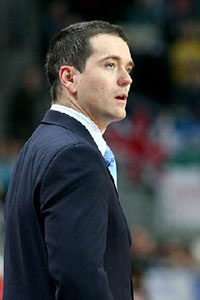
- Dedek in 2006.

Personal information
- Born: January 25, 1971 (age 55) Ljubljana, SR Slovenia, SFR Yugoslavia
- Position: Head coach
- Coaching career: 1995–present

Career history

Coaching
- 1988-1995: Jezica - Youth Categories
- 1995-1996: Iskra Litus (assistant)
- 1996-1997: Jezica
- 1997–1998: IMOS Jezica (W - Euroleague)
- 1998-1999: Slovan
- 1998–1999: Slovan U20
- 2000-2001: Kraski Zidar
- 2002-2003: Jurij Plava Laguna
- 2003–2006: Anwil Włocławek (assistant)
- 2006–2007: Anwil Włocławek
- 2007–2007: Śląsk Wrocław (assistant)
- 2007–2011: Asseco Prokom Gdynia (assistant)
- 2011–2012: AZS Koszalin (assistant)
- 2012–2013: Start Gdynia
- 2013–2015: Asseco Gdynia
- 2011–2012: AZS Koszalin
- 2016–2021: Start Lublin
- 2022: DEAC
- 2023–2024: Zastal Zielona Góra

Career highlights
- As coach: 1x Polish vice champion (2020); 1x Slovenian Champion - women team (1998); 1x Slovenian Cup Winner - women team (1998); 1x Slovenian 1. B league Champion (2002); 1x U17 Slovenian Campion (1994); 1x U19 Slovenian vice Campion (1995); 1x U20 Slovenian Campion (1999); As coach assistant: 5x Polish Champion (2003, 2008, 2009, 2010, 2011); 2x Polish vice Champion (2005, 2006); 1x Polish Cup Winner (2008); 1x Euroleague ELITE 8 (2010); 1x Euroleague TOP 16 (2009)

David Dedek (born 25 January 1971) is a Slovenian professional basketball coach. He was most recently the head coach for Zastal Zielona Góra of the Polish Basketball League.

== Education ==
David Dedek enrolled into Fakulteti za elektrotehniko in računalništvo v Ljubljani in 1989. He continued his education at Fakulteta za šport, where he has finished his education at the top of his class.

== Coaching career ==
David Dedek began his coaching career at Primary School Franceta Bevka in 1985, assisting the established educator Aleš Pečeta in winning the national championship in the primary school competition. He worked for several years in the youth department of KD Ježica. He was coaching young players till 1996 when he took over the senior team. Until 2003, he successfully worked in Slovenia before accepting an invitation from Andrej Urlep to go to Poland and join the Anwil Włocławek team. That year, he won the national championship with Anwil, the first in the club's history. After Anwil Włocławek he was coaching Śląsk Wrocław, Asseco Prokom Gdynia, Start Gdynia and AZS Koszalin. Midseason 2016 he took over Start Lublin team. In the 4th season he led the team to 2nd place in PLK. In the 2022/23 season he continued his coaching career in Hungary at DEAC. After Hungary he has returned to Poland to coach Zastal Zielona Góra in the 2023/24 season.

== Awards ==
=== Individual awards ===
- 1998 Basketball Coach of the year - ZKT Slovenije
- 2014 Sportsman of the month (january) - trojmiasto.pl
- 2015 Sportsman of the month (may) - trojmiasto.pl
- 2014 Basketball Coach of the year - redakcja Sportowe Fakty
- 2014 Basketball Coach of the year - Radio Gdansk
- 2015 Basketball Coach of the year - Radio Gdansk
- 2020 Basketball Coach of the year - redakcja Polski Kosz
- 2020 Best Basketball coach - redakcja Polsat Sport
- 2020 City Lublin - Coach of The Year Award
