= Igor Griszczuk =

Belarusian-Polish basketball player and coach

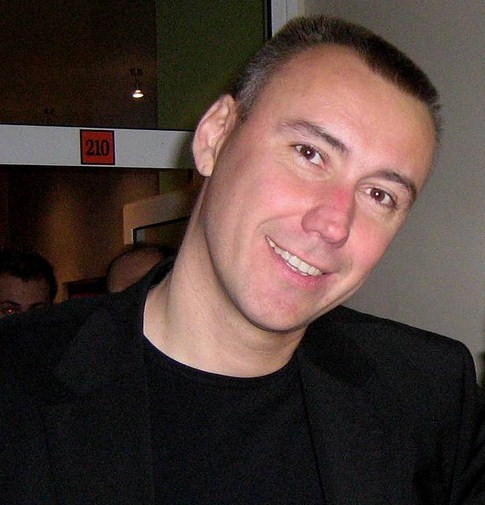
- Griszczuk in 2007

Personal information
- Born: 9 June 1964 (age 62) Minsk, Byelorussian SSR, Soviet Union
- Listed height: 194 cm (6 ft 4 in)
- Listed weight: 90 kg (198 lb)

Career information
- Playing career: 1981–2002
- Position: Shooting guard
- Number: 12
- Coaching career: 2002–present

Career history

Playing
- 1981–1989: RTI Minsk
- 1989–1991: Dynamo Moscow
- 1991–2002: Włocławek

Coaching
- 2002–2005: Włocławek (assistant)
- 2005–2008: Czarni Słupsk
- 2008–2010: Włocławek
- 2010–2011: Poland
- 2014–2017: Tsmoki-Minsk

Career highlights
- As player: No. 12 retired by Włocławek; PLK Most Valuable Player (1993); 4x All-PLK Team (1993, 1995, 1996, 1999); 5x PLK All-Star (1994–1996, 1999); 2x Polish Cup champion (1995, 1996); As coach: 3x Belarusian League champion (2015–2017)

Igor Griszczuk (born 9 June 1964; born as Ihar Hryščuk) is a Belarusian-Polish retired basketball player and current coach. Born in Minsk, he had a long career in Russia and Poland. His jersey number 12 was retired by Włocławek.

== Early life ==
Griszcuk started playing basketball in the fourth grade of primary school, at age 17, for RTI Minsk. Later, he played for MBC Dynamo Moscow while also serving in the military. In 1990, Griszcuk returned to RTI Minsk.

In the 1991–92 season, he made his debut in Poland playing for Pogoń Szczecin's basketball team in the Polish second division. He helped the team to promote by winning the finals of the play-offs. Griszczuk averaged 28.3 points per game in the playoffs.

He went on to play eleven years for KK Włocławek and was named to four All-PLK Teams and a PLK All-Star five times as well. He won the Polish Basketball Cup in 1995 and 1996.

On 21 October 1996, his jersey number 12 was retired by KK Włocławek.

== Coaching career ==
In 2014, he took over the defending Belarusian champions BC Tsmoki-Minsk. He won three Belarusian Premier League titles (from 2015 to 2017) and was the Coach of the Year in once (in 2017).

== Personal ==
On 20 February 1998, Griszczuk received the Polish nationality.
