= Hubert Radke =

Polish basketball player (born 1980)

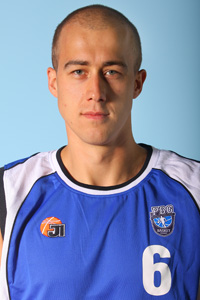

Personal information
- Born: 25 October 1980 (age 46) Radziejów, Poland
- Listed height: 6 ft 8 in (2.03 m)
- Listed weight: 240 lb (109 kg)

Career information
- College: Loyola Chicago (2000–2001)
- NBA draft: 2002: undrafted
- Playing career: 1998–2011
- Position: Center

Career history
- 1998–1999: Anwil Włocławek
- 1999–2000: AZS Toruń
- 2001–2004: Noteć Inowrocław
- 2004–2006: Anwil Włocławek
- 2005–2006: Turów Zgorzelec
- 2006–2007: Czarni Słupsk
- 2006–2007: Kotwica Kołobrzeg
- 2007: BC Rakvere Tarvas
- 2007–2009: Polonia Warszawa
- 2009–2010: PBG Basket Poznań
- 2010–2011: Siden Polski Cukier Toruń
- 2011: RosaSport Radom

Hubert Radke (born 25 October 1980 in Radziejów) is a Polish former professional basketball player who played at the center position. Radke represented the Poland national basketball team a total of 13 times between 2004 and 2005.

== Achievements with club ==
Anwil Włocławek

- Polish Basketball League:
  - Runner-up: 1999, 2005
