= Filip Dylewicz =

Polish basketball player (born 1980)

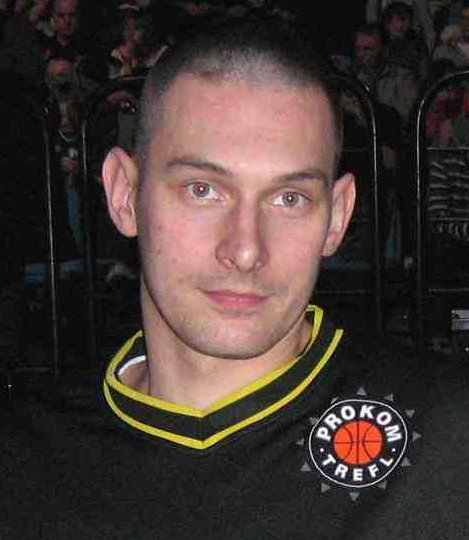

Personal information
- Born: 25 January 1980 (age 46) Bydgoszcz, Poland
- Listed height: 6 ft 8 in (2.03 m)
- Listed weight: 220 lb (100 kg)

Career information
- NBA draft: 2003: undrafted
- Playing career: 1997–2022
- Position: Power forward

Career history
- 1997–2009: Prokom Sopot
- 2009–2010: Scandone Avellino
- 2010–2013: Trefl Sopot
- 2013–2016: Turów Zgorzelec
- 2016–2018: Trefl Sopot
- 2018–2019: Arka Gdynia
- 2019–2020: Stal Ostrów Wielkopolski
- 2020–2022: Arka Gdynia

Career highlights
- 7× Polish League champion (2004–2009, 2014); 2× Polish Cup winner (2006, 2008); 2× Polish League Finals MVP (2008, 2014); Polish League Best Player (2010)

Filip Dylewicz (born 25 January 1980) is a Polish former professional basketball player. He also represented the Polish national basketball team in the international competitions.

== Professional career ==
Started playing in basketball in Astoria Bydgoszcz. In August 2013 he signed a contract with Turów Zgorzelec. He won the Polish championship with Turów, after they beat Stelmet Zielona Góra 4–2 in the Finals. Dylewicz was named PLK Finals MVP for the second time in his career, with averages of 16.6 points and 8.3 rebounds per game in the series.

On 15 July 2014 he signed a new two-year deal with Turów.

On 8 August 2016, Dylewicz returned to Trefl Sopot.

On 17 November 2019 he has signed with Stal Ostrów Wielkopolski of the Polish League (PLK).

On 6 July 2020 he signed with Arka Gdynia of the Polish Basketball League.

On 4 July 2022 he announced his retirement from professional basketball.

== Honours ==
- Polish League Champion: (7)

2004, 2005, 2006, 2007, 2008, 2009, 2014

- Polish Cup Winner: (2)

2006, 2008

- Polish League Finals MVP: 2

2008, 2014
