= SKS Starogard Gdański =

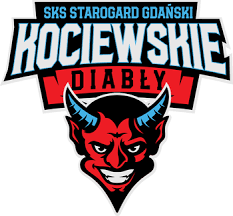
- Nickname: Kociewskie Diabły (Kociewian Devils)
- Leagues: I Liga
- Founded: 1957; 69 years ago
- History: SKS Starogard Gdański (1957-1994); SKS Pakmet Starogard Gdański (1994–1999); SKS Polpharma Starogard Gdański (1999–2022); SKS Fulimpex Starogard Gdański (2023-present)
- Arena: Hala Miejska im. Andrzejaaa Grubbby
- Capacity: 2,500
- Location: Starogard Gdański, Poland
- Team colors: White, Blue
- Main sponsor: Fulimpex
- Team manager: Marcin Fulbiszewski
- Head coach: Darko Radulović
- Championships: 1 Polish Cup; 1 Polish Supercup
- Website: kociewskiediably.pl
Home	Away

SKS Starogard Gdański, more commonly referred to as Kociewskie Diabły are a Polish professional basketball team based in Starogard Gdański. The team currently plays in the Polish I Liga, the second tier. In 2004, the team was promoted to the highest division in Poland. In 2011, the club won its first trophy when it beat Anwil Włocławek 75–61 in the Polish Cup Final. Following the cup triumph, Polpharma also won the Supercup, beating previous champions Asseco Prokom Gdynia 79–67.

== Players ==
=== Current roster ===
Note: Flags indicate national team eligibility at FIBA-sanctioned events. Players may hold other non-FIBA nationalities not displayed.

SKS Starogard Gdański roster
Players
Coaches

Pos.	No.	Nat.	Name	Ht.	Age
PG	0	(Poland)	Rajewicz, Wiktor	1.76 m (5 ft 9 in)	26 – 10 April 2000
G	1	(United States)	Johnson, Jikari	1.93 m (6 ft 4 in)	23 – 30 November 2002
PF	2	(Poland)	Komenda, Rafal	2.00 m (6 ft 7 in)	28 – 5 June 1998
G	3	(Poland)	Majewski, Bartosz	1.92 m (6 ft 4 in)	28 – 8 December 1997
C	4	(Latvia)	Gromovs, Ilja	2.10 m (6 ft 11 in)	32 – 4 August 1994
PG	7	(Poland)	Kowalczyk, Sebastian	1.88 m (6 ft 2 in)	33 – 25 March 1993
G	8	(Poland)	Serocki, Jakub	1.75 m (5 ft 9 in)	18 – 13 November 2007
F	9	(Poland)	Sewiol, Wiktor	1.98 m (6 ft 6 in)	29 – 24 January 1997
SG	22	(Poland)	Wrobel, Bartosz	1.90 m (6 ft 3 in)	31 – 10 August 1995
PF	32	(Poland)	Kedel, Patryk	2.01 m (6 ft 7 in)	27 – 26 January 1999
PG	47	(Poland)	Kordalski, Adrian	1.87 m (6 ft 2 in)	30 – 11 December 1995
PG	67	(Poland)	Majka, Kacper	1.83 m (6 ft 0 in)	29 – 6 January 1997
C	77	(Poland)	Niemiec, Artur	2.11 m (6 ft 11 in)	22 – 30 July 2004

Head coach

- (North Macedonia) Darko Radulović

Assistant coach(es)

- (Poland) Michael Lydkowski

Legend

- (C) Team captain
- Injured

- Roster
Updated: October 10, 2026

== Trophies ==
- Polish Cup
  - Champions (1): 2011
- Polish Supercup
  - Champions (1): 2011

== Season by season ==
Season	Tier	League	Pos	Polish Cup
2009–10	1	PLK	3rd	
2010–11	1	PLK	5th	Winner
2011–12	1	PLK	11th	
2012–13	1	PLK	8th	
2013–14	1	PLK	10th	
2014–15	1	PLK	15th	
2015–16	1	PLK	11th	
2016–17	1	PLK	7th	
2017–18	1	PLK	12th	

== Logos ==
Logo used until 2017

== Notable players ==
Note: Flags indicate national team eligibility at FIBA-sanctioned events. Players may hold other non-FIBA nationalities not displayed.

Criteria

To appear in this section a player must have either:

- Set a club record or won an individual award while at the club
- Played at least one official international match for their national team at any time
- Played at least one official NBA match at any time.

- (Poland) Zbigniew Bialek
- (Poland) Lukasz Majewski
- (Lithuania) Martynas Andriuškevičius
- (Poland) Damian Kulig
- (United States) Kirk Archibeque
- (Mexico) Brody Angley
- (United States) Jason Crowe
- (United States) Tony Meier
