= 2012–13 PLK season =

Tauron Basket Liga^{1}
- Games played: 221
- Teams: 12

Regular season
- Season MVP: (United States Virgin Islands) Walter Hodge

Finals
- Champions: Stelmet Zielona Góra; 1st title
- Runners-up: PGE Turów Zgorzelec
- Third place: AZS Koszalin
- Fourth place: Anwil Włocławek
- Finals MVP: (Georgia (country)) Quinton Hosley

Statistical leaders
Points	(Poland) Jakub Dłoniak	20.1
Rebounds	(United States) Kim Adams	9.0
Assists	(United States) Frank Turner	6.3

Records
- Highest scoring: (United States) Tony Weeden (39)
- Highest attendance: Zielona Góra (av. 3,868)
- Lowest attendance: Start Gdynia (av. 319)
- Average attendance: 1,741
- ^{1} Sponsored league name, referring to Tauron.

The 2012–13 Polish Basketball League – for sponsorship reasons Tauron Basket Liga – was the 79th season of the highest professional basketball league in Poland.

Stelmet Zielona Góra won the Polish championship, the club beat PGE Turów Zgorzelec 4–0 in the Finals.

== Standings ==
=== Round 1 ===
Pos	Team	Pld	W	L	PF	PA	PD	GAvg	Pts	
1	PGE Turów Zgorzelec	22	15	7	1831	1683	+148	1.09	37	Goes to Group 1
2	Stelmet Zielona Góra	22	15	7	1898	1836	+62	1.03	37	Goes to Group 1
3	Asseco Prokom Gdynia	22	15	7	1692	1570	+122	1.08	37	Goes to Group 1
4	Trefl Sopot	22	14	8	1860	1619	+241	1.15	36	Goes to Group 1
5	Anwil Włocławek	22	14	8	1673	1573	+100	1.06	36	Goes to Group 1
6	Energa Czarni Słupsk	22	13	9	1753	1704	+49	1.03	35	Goes to Group 1
7	Polpharma Starogard Gdański	22	10	12	1733	1787	−54	0.97	32	Goes to Group 2
8	AZS Koszalin	22	10	12	1692	1709	−17	0.99	32	Goes to Group 2
9	Jezioro Tarnobrzeg	22	9	13	1740	1855	−115	0.94	31	Goes to Group 2
10	Rosa Radom	22	6	16	1705	1844	−139	0.92	28	Goes to Group 2
11	Kotwica Kołobrzeg	22	6	16	1580	1759	−179	0.9	28	Goes to Group 2
12	Start Gdynia	22	5	17	1467	1685	−218	0.87	27	Goes to Group 2

=== Round 2 ===
==== Group 1–6 ====
Pos	Team	Pld	W	L	PF	PA	PD	GAvg	Pts	
1	PGE Turów Zgorzelec	32	23	9	2630	2371	+259	1.11	55	Qualifies for Playoffs
2	Trefl Sopot	32	21	11	2612	2345	+267	1.11	53	Qualifies for Playoffs
3	Stelmet Zielona Góra	32	20	12	2686	2658	+28	1.01	52	Qualifies for Playoffs
4	Asseco Prokom Gdynia	32	18	14	2427	2387	+40	1.02	50	Qualifies for Playoffs
5	Anwil Włocławek	32	18	14	2396	2316	+80	1.03	50	Qualifies for Playoffs
6	Energa Czarni Słupsk	32	16	16	2479	2431	+48	1.02	48	Qualifies for Playoffs

==== Group 7–12 ====
Pos	Team	Pld	W	L	PF	PA	PD	GAvg	Pts	
1	AZS Koszalin	32	18	14	2387	2325	+62	1.03	50	Qualifies for Playoffs
2	Polpharma Starogard Gdański	32	15	17	2491	2551	−60	0.98	47	Qualifies for Playoffs
3	Jezioro Tarnobrzeg	32	14	18	2548	2681	−133	0.95	46	
4	Rosa Radom	32	10	22	2471	2606	−135	0.95	42	
5	Start Gdynia	32	10	22	2153	2380	−227	0.9	42	
6	Kotwica Kołobrzeg	32	9	23	2227	2456	−229	0.91	41	

== Playoffs ==
Quarterfinals
1	PGE Turów Zgorzelec	3
8	Polpharma Starogard Gdański	0
5	Anwil Włocławek	3
4	Asseco Prokom Gdynia	1
3	Stelmet Zielona Góra	3
6	Energa Czarni Słupsk	2
7	AZS Koszalin	3
2	Trefl Sopot	1

Semifinals
1	PGE Turów Zgorzelec	3
5	Anwil Włocławek	1
3	Stelmet Zielona Góra	3
7	AZS Koszalin	0

Finals
1	PGE Turów Zgorzelec	0
3	Stelmet Zielona Góra	4

Third place

Third place
5	Anwil Włocławek	0
7	AZS Koszalin	2

== Polish clubs in European competitions ==
Team	Competition	Progress
Asseco Prokom Gdynia	Euroleague	Regular season
Trefl Sopot	Eurocup	Regular season
Stelmet Zielona Gora	Eurocup	Top 16

== Polish clubs in Regional competitions ==
Team	Competition	Progress
PGE Turow Zgorzelec	VTB United League	Regular season
