= Deividas Dulkys =

Lithuanian basketball player (born 1988)

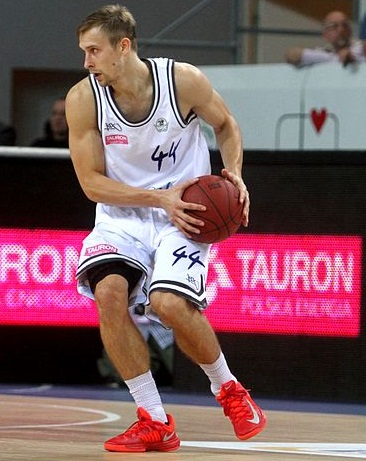
- Dulkys playing for Anwil Włocławek in 2013

Brooklyn Nets
- Title: Assistant coach
- League: NBA

Personal information
- Born: 21 March 1988 (age 38) Šilutė, Lithuania
- Listed height: 6 ft 4.75 in (1.95 m)
- Listed weight: 196 lb (89 kg)

Career information
- High school: Findlay College Prep (Henderson, Nevada)
- College: Florida State (2008–2012)
- NBA draft: 2012: undrafted
- Playing career: 2012–2021
- Position: Shooting guard / small forward

Career history

Playing
- 2012–2014: Lietuvos rytas Vilnius
- 2013: →Barons Riga
- 2013–2014: →Anwil Włocławek
- 2014: →Tofaş
- 2014–2015: Reyer Venezia
- 2015–2016: Yeşilgiresun Belediye
- 2016–2017: Obradoiro
- 2017–2018: İstanbul BB
- 2018–2019: Arka Gdynia
- 2019–2020: Manresa
- 2020: Rytas Vilnius
- 2020–2021: Manresa

Coaching
- 2021–2022: Memphis Hustle (assistant)
- 2022–2024: Sacramento Kings (player development)
- 2024–present: Brooklyn Nets (assistant)

Career highlights
- Polish League Top Scorer (2014); Polish League All-Star (2014)

Deividas Dulkys (born 12 March 1988) is a Lithuanian professional basketball coach and former player who is an assistant coach for the Brooklyn Nets of the National Basketball Association. (NBA). He played as a swingman.

== College career ==
Dulkys moved to the U.S. in 2005 to attend high school in the hopes of obtaining a college scholarship. He first attended Liberty Christian Academy in Lynchburg, Virginia before moving to Findlay College Prep in Henderson, Nevada, participating in their 32–1 record during his senior year (the loss in the National Prep school championship game).

During his time in Nevada he also played for the Branch West All-Star AAU.

He committed to Florida State University of the Atlantic Coast Conference of NCAA Division I in April 2007 amidst interest from Oregon and California.

With Florida State he played 131 career games (2nd best for FSU) as they reached the NCAA tournament in every of his 4 years in Florida, reaching the Sweet Sixteen in 2011. He was part of the first Seminoles team to win the ACC tournament during his senior season in 2012, Dulkys finished his collegiate career with 203 three-point shots made, including a FSU record 8 against #3 ranked North Carolina on ESPN College GameDay on 14 January 2012.

== Professional career ==
Going undrafted in the 2012 NBA draft, the Lithuanian returned home to join LKL and VTB United League side Lietuvos rytas Vilnius in July 2012, signing a multi-year contract.

He started the season with the Lithuanian giants, playing in Europe's top tier EuroLeague, before they loaned him to Latvian team Barons Riga for the second part of the season in order to gain more playing time, having played American basketball for more years he struggled re-adapting during his first year back in Europe.

For the 2013–14 season he was loaned from the start of the season to Polish side Anwil Włocławek of the, Tauron Basket Liga, he played well in Poland, being named best player in the TBL February 2014, earning a call-up to the All Star Game against Czech League players the same month.

Dulkys left the Polish side a few days later, being re-loaned by Lietuvos rytas Vilnius to Turkish outfit Tofaş for the remainder of the season after they bought out Anwil's contract with the player, the latter agreeing to lose a mayor player for financial reasons. He scored 11.4 points on 54.5 percent from 3-point range in 10 games, as Tofaş made it to the Turkish Basketball League quarter-finals.

After his two-year contract was seemingly not extended by Lietuvos rytas Vilnius, he joined Italian Serie A team Umana Reyer Venezia in July 2014.

On 19 June 2015, he signed with Yeşilgiresun Belediye of the Turkish Basketball League for the 2015–16 season.

On 11 October 2016, Dulkys signed with Rio Natura Monbus Obradoiro. Following the solid season in Liga ACB where he averaged 10.3 points, 2.5 rebounds and 2.6 assists, he joined the Golden State Warriors for the 2017 NBA Summer League.

In August 2017, Dulkys signed with İstanbul BB. He averaged 6.5 points, 2.3 rebounds and 2.5 assists per game in four games, a season shortened due to injury. On 4 August 2018, Dulkys signed with the Polish club Asseco Gdynia.

On 13 September 2019, he has signed with Baxi Manresa of the Liga ACB. Dulkys signed an extension with Manresa on 24 December.

On 13 November 2020, Dulkys returned to Manresa.

== Coaching career ==
On 23 October 2021, Dulkys became an assistant coach for the Memphis Hustle.

On 12 August 2022, Dulkys became a player development coach for the Sacramento Kings.

On May 31, 2024, the Brooklyn Nets announced the hiring of Dulkys as an assistant coach.

== National team career ==
Fresh out of college Dulkys played for Lithuania in the 2012 Olympic qualification, he finished with a solitary three-pointer scored in six minutes spread across three games, but was not selected for the Olympics competition.

== Personal life ==
Dulkys met his wife whilst they were both studying at Florida State University. She has an interior design shop.
