= KKS Pro-Basket Kutno =

Polfarmex Kutno
- Leagues: I Liga
- Founded: 2000; 26 years ago
- Dissolved: 2019; 7 years ago
- Arena: Hala SP Nr. 9
- Capacity: 1,150
- Location: Kutno, Poland
- Team colors: Blue, Gold, White
- President: Sławomir Erywiński
- Head coach: Jarosław Krysiewicz
- Website: www.probasket.net.pl
Home	Away

KKS Pro-Basket Kutno, for sponsorship reasons also known as Polfarmex Kutno, was a Polish professional basketball team based in Kutno. The team played in the I Liga, the second-tier league in Poland, before folding operations after the 2018–2019 season.

== History ==
Kutno was promoted to the PLK after the club won the I Liga in 2014.

== Honours ==
- I Liga

Champions (1): 2013–14

== Season by season ==
Season	Tier	League	Pos	Polish Cup
2013–14	2	1 Liga	1st	
2014–15	1	PLK	10th	
2015–16	1	PLK	7th	Quarterfinalist
2016–17	1	PLK	17th	
2017–18	2	1 Liga	6th	
2018–19	2	1 Liga	12th	

== Notable players ==
Note: Flags indicate national team eligibility at FIBA-sanctioned events. Players may hold other non-FIBA nationalities not displayed.

Criteria

To appear in this section a player must have either:

- Set a club record or won an individual award while at the club
- Played at least one official international match for their national team at any time
- Played at least one official NBA match at any time.

- (Czech Republic) Patrik Auda
- (Kosovo) Dardan Berisha
- (United States) Kevin Johnson
- (Poland) Kamil Łączyński
- (Belarus) Maksim Salash
- (Poland) Mariusz Bacik
- (Slovakia) Michal Batka
- (Poland) Mateusz Bartosz
