= Siarka Tarnobrzeg (basketball) =

KKS Siarka Tarnobrzeg
- Leagues: II liga (2019)
- Founded: 1962
- Folded: 2019
- Arena: OSiR Wisła Hall
- Capacity: 1,700
- Location: Tarnobrzeg, Poland
- Team colors: Gold, Green
- President: Zbigniew Pyszniak (2019)
- Head coach: Zbigniew Pyszniak (2019)
Home	Away

KKS Siarka Tarnobrzeg was a Polish professional basketball team, founded in 1962 and based in Tarnobrzeg, Poland. The team played in the Polish Basketball League (PLK) in 2010s. KKS Siarka Tarnobrzeg club withdrew the team from the third-tier II liga games for the 2018–19 season on 4 January 2019.

== Season by season ==
The Siarka logo with the former blue and white color scheme

Season	Tier	League	Pos.	Polish Cup
2011–12	1	PLK	5th	
2012–13	1	PLK	9th	
2013–14	1	PLK	11th	
2014–15	1	PLK	16th	
2015–16	1	PLK	16th	
2016–17	1	PLK	16th	

== Notable players ==
Note: Flags indicate national team eligibility at FIBA-sanctioned events. Players may hold other non-FIBA nationalities not displayed.

Criteria

To appear in this section a player must have either:

- Set a club record or won an individual award while at the club
- Played at least one official international match for their national team at any time
- Played at least one official NBA match at any time.

- (Poland) Przemek Karnowski
- (United States) Reggie Hamilton
