= Rosa Radom =

Polish professional basketball team

HydroTruck Radom
- Leagues: I Liga
- Founded: 2003
- History: KS Rosa Radom; 2003–2009; Rosasport Radom; 2009–2010; Rosa Radom; 2010–2018; HydroTruck Radom; 2018–present
- Arena: Hala MOSiR
- Capacity: 1,200
- Location: Radom, Poland
- Team colors: Blue, white
- President: Piotr Kardaś
- Head coach: Robert Witka
- Team captain: Daniel Wall
- Ownership: Zbigniew Sitkowski
- Championships: 1 Polish Cup; 1 Polish Supercup
- Website: hydrotrucksport.pl
Home	Away

Rosa Radom, also known as HydroTruck Radom for sponsorship reasons, is a Polish professional basketball team based in Radom. The club was founded in 2003 and plays in the I Liga since the 2022–23 season.

== History ==
In the 2011–12 season of the 1 Liga, Rosa Radom reached the Finals but lost 3–1 to Start Gdynia. The team was still promoted to the highest level PLK. In 2016, the team won its first trophy when it upset Stelmet Zielona Góra in the Polish Cup Final, winning 74–64. Rosa's C. J. Harris was named the Cup MVP.

== Players ==
=== Current roster ===
Note: Flags indicate national team eligibility at FIBA-sanctioned events. Players may hold other non-FIBA nationalities not displayed.

Rosa Radom roster
Players
Coaches

Pos.	No.	Nat.	Name
PF	2	(United States)	Moore, Mike	2.03 m (6 ft 8 in)	31 – 30 April 1994
PG	3	(United States)	Ireland, Anthony	1.76 m (5 ft 9 in)	34 – 25 September 1991
G	4	(United States)	Davis, Mike	1.93 m (6 ft 4 in)	29 – 22 May 1996
SG	9	(United States)	Hill, Ahmed	1.96 m (6 ft 5 in)	30 – 21 March 1995
PG	12	(Poland)	Dzierżak, Paweł	1.88 m (6 ft 2 in)	30 – 7 April 1995
G	13	(Poland)	Zalewski, Jakub	1.85 m (6 ft 1 in)	39 – 21 June 1986
PF	16	(Poland)	Wall, Daniel (C)	1.96 m (6 ft 5 in)	43 – 2 March 1982
SF	21	(Serbia)	Ostojić, Danilo	2.01 m (6 ft 7 in)	29 – 11 May 1996
G	25	(Poland)	Domański, Jakub	1.73 m (5 ft 8 in)	20 – 2 January 2005
SG	29	(Poland)	Zegzuła, Filip	1.88 m (6 ft 2 in)	30 – 29 December 1994
C	47	(Croatia)	Kraljević, Filip	2.13 m (7 ft 0 in)	35 – 13 December 1989

Head coach

- (Poland) Robert Witka

Assistant coach(es)

- (Poland) Maciej Dudzik

Legend

- (C) Team captain
- Injured

- Roster
Updated: May 28, 2022

=== Notable players ===
Note: Flags indicate national team eligibility at FIBA-sanctioned events. Players may hold other non-FIBA nationalities not displayed.

Criteria

To appear in this section a player must have either:

- Set a club record or won an individual award while at the club
- Played at least one official international match for their national team at any time
- Played at least one official NBA match at any time.

- (Poland) Hubert Radke
- (Ukraine) Igor Zajcew
- (Finland) Carl Lindbom
- (Georgia (country)) Duda Sanadze
- (United States) Tyrone Brazelton
- (United States) Danny Gibson
- (United States) C. J. Harris
- (United States) Torey Thomas

== Honors ==
Polish League

- Winners (0): None
  - Runner-up (1): 2016
    - Fourth place (2): 2014, 2015

Polish Cup

- Champions (1): 2016
  - Runner-up (1): 2015

Polish Supercup

- Winners (1): 2016

== Season by season ==
Season	Tier	League	Pos.	Polish Cup	European competitions	
2009–10	3	2 Liga	1st			
2010–11	2	1 Liga	3rd			
2011–12	2	1 Liga	2nd			
2012–13	1	PLK	10th			
2013–14	1	PLK	4th			
2014–15	1	PLK	4th	Runner-up		
2015–16	1	PLK	2nd	Champions	3 FIBA Europe Cup	L32
2016–17	1	PLK	6th		3 Champions League	RS
2017–18	1	PLK	5th		3 Champions League	RS
2018–19	1	PLK	11th		4 FIBA Europe Cup	QR1
2019–20	1	PLK	12th			
2020–21	1	PLK	14th			
2021–22	1	PLK	16th			
