= CRS Hall Zielona Góra =

Sports arena in Poland

Coordinates: 51°57′22″N 15°31′26″E

Centrum Rekreacyjno-Sportowe
- Hala MOSiR
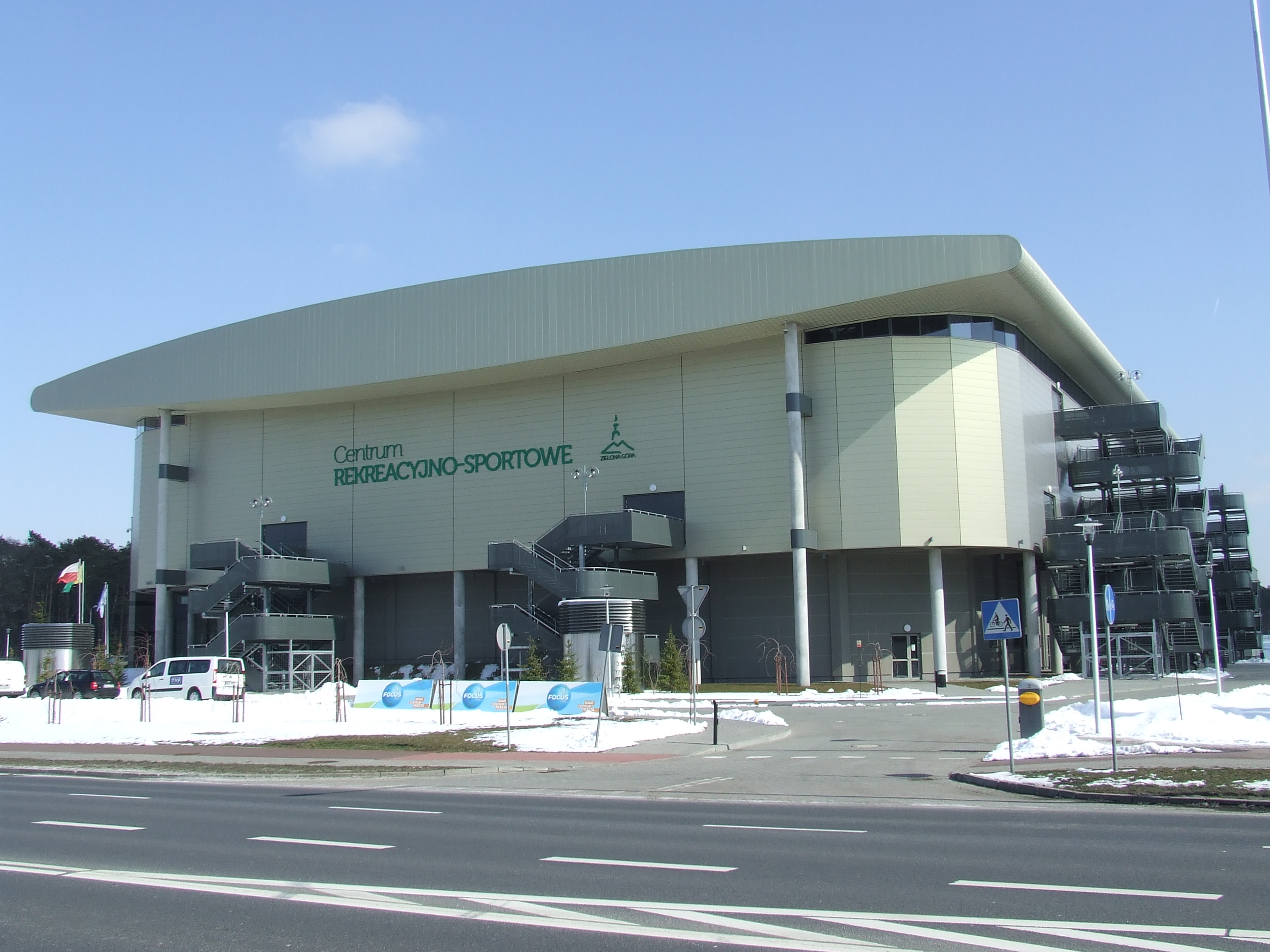
- Interactive map of Centrum Rekreacyjno-Sportowe
- Location: Zielona Góra, Poland
- Operator: MOSiR Zielona Góra
- Capacity: Basketball: 5,080 (permanent seating); 6,080 (with retractable seating)
- Surface: Parquet

Construction
- Groundbreaking: 2008
- Opened: June 26, 2010

Tenant
- Zastal Zielona Góra

CRS Hall Zielona Góra, officially Centrum Rekreacyjno-Sportowe w Zielonej Górze in Polish, is a multi-use indoor sporting arena that is located in Zielona Góra, Poland.

The arena can be used for basketball, handball, futsal, volleyball, and cultural and entertainment events. The seating capacity of the arena for basketball games is 6,080, of which 5,080 seats are permanent and 1,000 seats are retractable. It is the home arena of the Polish League professional basketball club Zastal Zielona Góra.

== See also ==
- List of indoor arenas in Poland
- Sport in Poland
