= AZS Koszalin =

- Leagues: I Liga
- Founded: 1968; 58 years ago
- Folded: 2019; 7 years ago
- History: AZS Koszalin (1968–2019)
- Arena: Hala Widowiskowo-Sportowa
- Capacity: 3,000
- Location: Koszalin, Poland
- Team colors: White, blue, silver
- Championships: 1 Polish Cup
- Website: www.azs.koszalin.pl
Home	Away

AZS Koszalin were a Polish basketball team, based in Koszalin. AZS was playing in the Polish Basketball League (PLK), the top division, from 2003 all the way until its bankruptcy in 2019.

== History ==
The AZS Koszalin sports club was founded on 8 October 1968. The founding fathers participating in the meeting, together with invited guests, decided that the creation of a sports club was vital and would contribute to the sports life of the city. The emergence of the AZS Koszalin sports club was supposed to fill in the geographic gap that existed in the region between Gdańsk and Szczecin.

It was assumed that the newly founded club would take part in actively promoting sports and physical education among students. The accepted action plan for the areas of work for the AZS was based on the development of traditional academic team disciplines as well as on occasionally performed individual disciplines. In the beginnings of its existence the club had many active subsections including: volleyball, basketball, swimming, athletics, badminton and judo.

Throughout its growing process, the AZS started to co-operate with local schools in Koszalin. The effects of this co-operation were many successes of local teams on a national and even international scale. Alumni of these schools were known Olympic athletes as well as athletes representing Poland internationally (the Wołujewiczówny sisters, Leszek Doliński, Dariusz Zelig, Wiesława Reut, Ryszard Razik, Krzysztof Janicki, Wioleta Gawęcka, Małgorzata Janowicz and others).

Ultimately the AZS focuses mainly on their men's basketball team, slowly moving away from their women's basketball team, which has stopped competing since 1999.

At the present time, the club's entire attention is focused on the first team. The training of children and youngsters is limited leading to giving up this field of activity. Focusing entirely on the first team results in the team's advance to the first league and following that to the ekstraklasa league.

After the 2018/2019 season, AZS Koszalin announced bankruptcy.

== Logos ==
Logo used till the 2014–15 season

== Current roster ==
AZS Koszalin roster
Players	Coaches
Pos. / No. / Nat. / Name / Ht. / Age	Head coach: Vacant; Assistant coach(es): Vacant; Legend: (C) Team captain; Injured

== Notable players ==
- Oded Brandwein (born 1988), Israeli-Polish basketball player for Maccabi Tel Aviv of the Euroleague and the Israeli Basketball Premier League

== Season by season ==
Season	Tier	League	Pos	Polish Cup	European competitions
2009–10	1	PLK	6th	Winner	
2010–11	1	PLK	8th		
2011–12	1	PLK	8th		
2012–13	1	PLK	7th	Runner-up	
2013–14	1	PLK	8th		
2014–15	1	PLK	5th	Semifinalist	
2015–16	1	PLK	12th		
2016–17	1	PLK	14th		
2017–18	1	PLK	13th		
