= Donar Groningen in European basketball =

Dutch professional basketball club

Donar in international basketball
- Club: Donar
- Seasons played: 20
- First entry: 1974–75 FIBA Korać Cup
- Latest entry: 2023–24 FIBA Europe Cup

Donar, internationally represented as Donar Groningen, is a Dutch professional basketball club based in Groningen. The club made its debut in international competitions in 1974 in the 1974–75 FIBA Korać Cup. Since then, Donar has played in European competitions in 20 seasons organised by FIBA Europe or Euroleague Basketball.

== List of games ==
Aggregate results list Donar's point tally first. All statistics are updated as of 8 October 2023.

Colour key

Wins
Draws
Losses
Competition winners
Competition runners-up

Key

- QR = Qualifying round
- R1 = First round
- R2 = Second round
- RS = Regular season
- R16 = Round of 16
- QF = Quarterfinals
- SF = Semifinals
- OT = After overtime
- N = Neutral venue

Season	Tier	Competition	Round	Club	Home	Away	Aggregrate
1974–75	3	Korać Cup	R1	(Luxembourg) Etzella	129–68	78–110	239–146
1974–75	3	Korać Cup	R2	(France) ASVEL	90–82	87–64	154–169
1981–82	3	Korać Cup	R1	(England) Solent Stars Southampton	107–77	105–92	199–182
1981–82	3	Korać Cup	R2	(Spain) Cotonificio Badalona	104–82	107–83	187–189
1982–83	1	European Champions Cup	R1	(Norway) Ammerud	116–67	56–106	222–123
1982–83	1	European Champions Cup	R2	(Israel) Maccabi Tel Aviv	76–69	88–68	144–157
1990–91	3	Korać Cup	R1	(Socialist Federal Republic of Yugoslavia) Vojvodina	80–90	102–73	153–192
1999–2000	3	Korać Cup	Q	(Switzerland) Vacallo	61–78	86–73	134–164
2000–01	3	Korać Cup	R1	(Belgium) Athlon Ieper	70–88	76–72	142–162
2004–05	2	ULEB Cup	RS	(Greece) Maroússi	74–82	85–51	5th in Group C
2004–05	2	ULEB Cup	RS	(Belgium) Oostende	97–85	84–97	5th in Group C
2004–05	2	ULEB Cup	RS	(Spain) Gran Canaria	69–79	80–63	5th in Group C
2004–05	2	ULEB Cup	RS	(Croatia) Zadar	73–71	74–51	5th in Group C
2004–05	2	ULEB Cup	RS	(France) Cholet	72–74	79–67	5th in Group C
2005–06	3	FIBA EuroCup	RS	(Poland) Śląsk Wroclaw	69–79	77–68	3rd in Group F
2005–06	3	FIBA EuroCup	RS	(Israel) Hapoel Tel Aviv	72–74	66–73	3rd in Group F
2005–06	3	FIBA EuroCup	RS	(Greece) Maroússi	73–68	65–53	3rd in Group F
2007–08	2	ULEB Cup	RS	(Romania) CSU Ploieşti	81–95	80–73	6th in Group E
2007–08	2	ULEB Cup	RS	(Turkey) Galatasaray	60–93	101–67	6th in Group E
2007–08	2	ULEB Cup	RS	(Spain) Akavayu Girona	91–105	96–63	6th in Group E
2007–08	2	ULEB Cup	RS	(Serbia) Vršac	94–85	102–77	6th in Group E
2007–08	2	ULEB Cup	RS	(Belgium) Spirou Charleroi	79–73	85–76	6th in Group E
2010–11	1	Euroleague	Q1	(Russia) UNICS Kazan	72–84	78–63	135–162
2010–11	2	Eurocup	RS	(Turkey) Galatasaray	65–66	57–63	4th in Group E
2010–11	2	Eurocup	RS	(Greece) Panellinios	57–63	68–51	4th in Group E
2010–11	2	Eurocup	RS	(Italy) Cantù	80–74	81–54	4th in Group E
2011–12	2	EuroCup	RS	(Lithuania) Prienai	87–82	97–70	4th in Group E
2011–12	2	EuroCup	RS	(Greece) Aris Thessaloniki	51–58	79–58	4th in Group E
2011–12	2	EuroCup	RS	(Czech Republic) ČEZ Nymburk	75–92	93–60	4th in Group E
2013–14	3	EuroChallenge	RS	(Italy) Reggio Emilia	85–60	78–61	4th in Group E
2013–14	3	EuroChallenge	RS	(Finland) KTP	72–76	72–76	4th in Group E
2013–14	3	EuroChallenge	RS	(Belgium) Okapi Aalstar	63–70	83–82 (OT)	4th in Group E
2015–16	3	FIBA Europe Cup	RS	(France) ASVEL	66–85	81–45	3rd in Group A
2015–16	3	FIBA Europe Cup	RS	(Belgium) Mons-Hainaut	77–75	90–76	3rd in Group A
2015–16	3	FIBA Europe Cup	RS	(Hungary) Körmend	78–71	75–72	3rd in Group A
2016–17	3	Champions League	Q1	(Estonia) Tartu	76–76	65–57	133–141
2016–17	4	FIBA Europe Cup	RS	(France) Gravelines	70–79	71–67	2nd in Group B
2016–17	4	FIBA Europe Cup	RS	(Belgium) Limburg United	98–70	90–97	2nd in Group B
2016–17	4	FIBA Europe Cup	RS	(Hungary) Körmend	79–74	72–79	2nd in Group B
2016–17	4	FIBA Europe Cup	R2	(Russia) Enisey	76–84	67–81	2nd in Group P
2016–17	4	FIBA Europe Cup	R2	(Portugal) Benfica	81–78	82–94	2nd in Group P
2016–17	4	FIBA Europe Cup	R2	(Bulgaria) Lukoil Academic	95–89	88–64	2nd in Group P
2017–18	3	Basketball Champions League	Q1	(Lithuania) Vytautas	75–77	61–84	159–138
2017–18	3	Basketball Champions League	Q2	(Denmark) Bakken Bears	78–80	83–91	169–163
2017–18	3	Basketball Champions League	Q3	(Spain) Estudiantes	76–76	77–69 (OT)	145–153
2017–18	4	FIBA Europe Cup	RS	(France) ESSM Le Portel	77–72	60–49	2nd in Group A
2017–18	4	FIBA Europe Cup	RS	(Bosnia and Herzegovina) Bosna Royal	94–56	43–72	2nd in Group A
2017–18	4	FIBA Europe Cup	RS	(Belgium) Antwerp Giants	84–82 (OT)	78–77	2nd in Group A
2017–18	4	FIBA Europe Cup	R2	(Romania) U-BT Cluj-Napoca	92–72	73–77	1st in Group L
2017–18	4	FIBA Europe Cup	R2	(Cyprus) Keravnos	109–69	74–72	1st in Group L
2017–18	4	FIBA Europe Cup	R2	(Belgium) Mons-Hainaut	96–72	84–65	1st in Group L
2017–18	4	FIBA Europe Cup	L16	(Romania) U-BT Cluj-Napoca	103–76	69–76	179–145
2017–18	4	FIBA Europe Cup	QF	(Montenegro) Mornar Bar	101–74	73–67	168–147
2017–18	4	FIBA Europe Cup	SF	(Italy) Reyer Venezia	83–80	82–72	155–162
2018–19	3	Basketball Champions League	Q1	(Kosovo) Prishtina	80–55	84–64	144–139
2018–19	3	Basketball Champions League	Q2	(Switzerland) Fribourg Olympic	67–72	77–79	144–151
2018–19	4	FIBA Europe Cup	RS	(Turkey) Pınar Karsiyaka	89–83	64–69	1st in Group C
2018–19	4	FIBA Europe Cup	RS	(Belgium) Spirou Charleroi	76–73	94–64	1st in Group C
2018–19	4	FIBA Europe Cup	RS	(Turkey) Istanbul BB	90–81	47–85	1st in Group C
2018–19	4	FIBA Europe Cup	R2	(Italy) Varese	67–73	77–80	3rd in Group
2018–19	4	FIBA Europe Cup	R2	(Cyprus) AEK Larnaca	70–80	56–78	3rd in Group
2018–19	4	FIBA Europe Cup	R2	(Italy) Dinamo Sassari	76–84	97–74	3rd in Group
2018–19	4	FIBA Europe Cup	R16	(Belgium) Oostende	66–66	80–88	146–154
2019–20	3	Champions League	Q1	(Portugal) Benfica	76–66	94–65	141–161
2019–20	4	FIBA Europe Cup	RS	(Turkey) Pınar Karsiyaka	62–79	77–59	3rd in Group E
2019–20	4	FIBA Europe Cup	RS	(Belgium) Spirou Charleroi	64–78	87–56	3rd in Group E
2019–20	4	FIBA Europe Cup	RS	(Belgium) Phoenix Brussels	75–63	70–72	3rd in Group E
2020–21	3	Champions League	Q1	(Ukraine) Dnipro	88–53 (N)		
2020–21	3	Champions League	Q2	(Cyprus) Keravnos	57–60 (N)		
2020–21	4	FIBA Europe Cup	RS	(Russia) Parma Perm	81–93		3rd in Group F
2020–21	4	FIBA Europe Cup	RS	(Netherlands) Heroes Den Bosch	98–99		3rd in Group F
2020–21	4	FIBA Europe Cup	RS	(Belarus) Borisfen	20–0 (Note: Donar won with a walk over after Borisfen could not play due to health rules concerning the COVID-19 pandemic.)		3rd in Group F
2021–22	4	FIBA Europe Cup	QR1	(Austria) Swans Gmunden	80–53 (N)		
2021–22	4	FIBA Europe Cup	QR2	(Portugal) Benfica	73–81 (N) (Note: Donar lost to Benfica in the second qualifying round, but still qualified as a Lucky Loser as it was ranked second of the four eliminated teams.)		
2021–22	4	FIBA Europe Cup	RS	(United Kingdom) London Lions	60–79	85–67	3rd in Group A
2021–22	4	FIBA Europe Cup	RS	(Germany) Medi Bayreuth	64–71	61–84	3rd in Group A
2021–22	4	FIBA Europe Cup	RS	(Austria) Kapfenberg Bulls	85–59	85–89 (OT)	3rd in Group A
2022–23	4	FIBA Europe Cup	RS	(Italy) New Basket Brindisi	65–87	57–81	4th in Group F
2022–23	4	FIBA Europe Cup	RS	(Ukraine) Budivelnyk	61–74	81–86	4th in Group F
2022–23	4	FIBA Europe Cup	RS	(Estonia) Kalev	41–94	65–75	4th in Group F
2023–24	4	FIBA Europe Cup	QR	(North Macedonia) Rabotnički	65–62		3rd in qualifying tournament A
2023–24	4	FIBA Europe Cup	QR	(Romania) Rapid Bucharest	65–69		3rd in qualifying tournament A
2023–24	4	FIBA Europe Cup	QR	(Azerbaijan) Sabah	72–75		3rd in qualifying tournament A

=== Non-FIBA competitions ===
In 2006, Donar (then known as Hanzevast Capitals) played in the Haarlem Basketball Week, an International tournament in Amsterdam hosted during the winter break. Six years later, in 2012, the team hosted the Groninger Basketball Week at the MartiniPlaza.

For the 2024–25 season, Donar joined the European North Basketball League (ENBL), a FIBA-affiliated but separately organised competition for basketball teams across the continent.

Season	Tournament	Round	Club	Score
2006	Haarlem Basketball Week	Group stage	Israel	79–81 (OT)
2006	Haarlem Basketball Week	Group stage	(Netherlands) EiffelTowers Den Bosch	Lost (Unknown)
2006	Haarlem Basketball Week	Group stage	(Argentina) Estudiantes de Bahia Blanca	93–70
2012	Groninger Basketball Week	Group stage	Egypt	92–90
2012	Groninger Basketball Week	Group stage	(Bosnia and Herzegovina) Bosna	82–56
2012	Groninger Basketball Week	Semifinal	(Lithuania) Šiauliai	74–78
2024–25	European North Basketball League	Regular season	(Czech Republic) Opava	86–88
2024–25	European North Basketball League	Regular season	(Latvia) Valmiera Glass ViA	78-81 (OT)
2024–25	European North Basketball League	Regular season	(Estonia) Tartu	70–89
2024–25	European North Basketball League	Regular season	(Poland) Dziki Warsaw	79–95
2024–25	European North Basketball League	Regular season	(Slovakia) Spišskí Rytieri	88–68
2024–25	European North Basketball League	Regular season	(Bulgaria) Spartak Pleven	87–84
2024–25	European North Basketball League	Regular season	(Romania) CSO Voluntari	83–89
2024–25	European North Basketball League	Regular season	(United Kingdom) Newcastle Eagles	63–67
2025–26	European North Basketball League	Regular season	(Latvia) Valmiera Glass ViA	88–92
2025–26	European North Basketball League	Regular season	(Estonia) TalTech	93–71
2025–26	European North Basketball League	Regular season	(United Kingdom) Bristol Flyers	70–69
2025–26	European North Basketball League	Regular season	(Romania) CSO Voluntari	91–97
2025–26	European North Basketball League	Regular season	(Norway) Fyllingen Lions	88–80
2025–26	European North Basketball League	Regular season	(Croatia) Alkar	90–71
2025–26	European North Basketball League	Regular season	(Germany) Mitteldeutscher BC	104–106
2025–26	European North Basketball League	Regular season	(Austria) Hefte Helfen Bulls	89–81
2025–26	European North Basketball League	Round of 16	(Czech Republic) Opava	103–86
2025–26	European North Basketball League	Quarter-finals	(Germany) Mitteldeutscher BC	81–100
2025–26	European North Basketball League	Quarter-finals	(Germany) Mitteldeutscher BC	73–80
2026–27	European North Basketball League	Regular season	(Poland) Anwil Włocławek	81–97
2026–27	European North Basketball League	Regular season	(Estonia) TalTech	70–83
2026–27	European North Basketball League	Regular season	(Romania) CSO Voluntari	90–71
2026–27	European North Basketball League	Regular season	(Croatia) Alkar Sinj	92–80
2026–27	European North Basketball League	Regular season	(Cyprus) TRIA EKA AEL	83–81
2026–27	European North Basketball League	Regular season	(Norway) Fyllingen Lions	
2026–27	European North Basketball League	Regular season	(Bulgaria) Spartak Pleven	
2026–27	European North Basketball League	Regular season	(Bosnia and Herzegovina) HKK Zrinjski 1992	

== Overall record ==
All statistics are correct as of after the 2023–24 season.

Colour key

Positive balance (more wins)
Neutral balance (equal W/L ratio)
Negative balance (more losses)

=== By country ===
Donar record in European basketball by country
Country	Pld	W	D	L	Win%
Austria	3	3	0	0	1.000
Azerbaijan	1	1	0	1	.000
Belarus	1	1	0	0	1.000
Belgium	22	11	1	12	.479
Bosnia and Herzegovina	2	2	0	0	1.000
Bulgaria	2	1	0	1	.500
Croatia	2	1	0	1	.500
Cyprus	5	2	0	3	.400
Czechia	2	0	0	2	.000
Denmark	2	1	0	1	.500
Estonia	4	1	1	2	.375
Finland	2	1	0	1	.500
France	12	2	0	10	.167
Germany	2	0	0	2	.000
Greece	8	1	0	7	.125
Hungary	4	3	0	1	.750
Israel	4	2	0	2	.500
Italy	12	4	0	8	.333
Kosovo	2	1	0	1	.500
Lithuania	4	2	0	2	.500
Luxembourg	2	2	0	0	1.000
Montenegro	2	1	0	1	.500
Netherlands	1	0	0	1	.000
North Macedonia	1	1	0	0	1.000
Norway	2	2	0	0	1.000
Poland	2	0	0	2	.000
Portugal	5	3	0	2	.600
Romania	4	2	0	3	.400
Russia	5	1	0	4	.200
Serbia	2	1	0	1	.500
Spain	7	1	1	6	.188
Switzerland	4	1	0	3	.250
Turkey	10	4	0	6	.400
Ukraine	3	1	2	0	.333
United Kingdom	4	2	0	2	.500
Yugoslavia	2	0	0	2	.000
Total	163	61	3	92	.401

=== By club ===
Donar record in European basketball by club
Club	Country	Pld	W	D	L	Win%
AEK Larnaca	Cyprus	2	1	0	1	.500
Ammerud	Norway	2	2	0	0	1.000
Antwerp Giants	Belgium	2	1	0	1	.500
Aris Thessaloniki	Greece	2	0	0	2	.000
ASVEL	France	4	1	0	3	.250
Athlon Ieper	Belgium	2	0	0	2	.000
Bakken Bears	Denmark	2	1	0	1	.500
Bayreuth	Germany	2	0	0	2	.000
Benfica	Portugal	5	3	0	2	.600
Bosna	Bosnia and Herzegovina	2	2	0	0	1.000
Borsifen	Belarus	1	1	0	0	1.000
New Basket Brindisi	Italy	2	0	0	2	.000
Budivelnyk Kiev	Ukraine	2	0	0	2	.000
Cantú	Italy	2	1	0	1	.500
Cholet	France	2	0	0	2	.000
CSU Ploiești	Romania	2	0	0	2	.000
Dinamo Sassari	Italy	2	0	0	2	.000
Dnipro	Ukraine	1	1	0	0	1.000
Enisey	Russia	2	1	0	1	.500
Estudiantes	Spain	2	0	1	1	.250
Etzella	Luxembourg	2	2	0	0	1.000
Fribourg Olympic	Switzerland	2	1	0	1	.500
Sant Josep Girona	Spain	2	0	0	2	.000
Galatasaray	Turkey	4	0	0	4	.000
Gran Canaria	Spain	2	0	0	2	.000
Gravelines-Dunkerque	France	2	0	0	2	.000
Hapoel Tel Aviv	Israel	2	1	0	1	.500
Heroes Den Bosch	Netherlands	1	0	0	1	.000
Istanbul BB	Turkey	2	2	0	0	1.000
Círcol Catòlic de Badalona	Spain	2	1	0	1	.500
Kalev	Estonia	2	0	0	2	.000
Kapfenberg Bulls	Austria	2	2	0	0	1.000
Karşıyaka	Turkey	4	2	0	2	.500
Keravnos	Cyprus	3	1	0	2	.333
Körmend	Hungary	4	3	0	1	.750
KTP	Finland	2	1	0	1	.500
Limburg United	Belgium	2	2	0	0	1.000
London Lions	United Kingdom	2	0	0	2	.000
Lukoil Academic	Bulgaria	2	1	0	1	.500
Maccabi Tel Aviv	Israel	2	1	0	1	.500
Maroússi	Greece	4	1	0	3	.250
Mons-Hainaut	Belgium	4	2	0	2	.500
Mornar	Montenegro	2	1	0	1	.500
Nymburk	Czechia	2	0	0	2	.000
Okapi Aalst	Belgium	2	0	0	2	.000
Oostende	Belgium	4	2	1	1	.625
Panelliniios	Greece	2	0	0	2	.000
Parma	Russia	1	0	0	1	.000
Phoenix Brussels	Belgium	2	2	0	0	1.000
Prienai	Lithuania	2	1	0	1	.500
Prishtina	Kosovo	2	1	0	1	.500
Reggiana	Italy	2	1	0	1	.500
Rabotnički	North Macedonia	1	1	0	0	1.000
Rapid București	Romania	1	0	0	1	.000
Reyer Venezia	Italy	2	1	0	1	.500
Sabah	Azerbaijan	1	0	0	1	.000
Spirou	Belgium	6	3	0	3	.500
Śląsk Wrocław	Poland	2	0	0	2	.000
Solent Stars	United Kingdom	2	2	0	0	1.000
Swans Gmunden	Austria	1	1	0	0	1.000
Tartu	Estonia	1	0	1	1	.250
U-BT Cluj-Napoca	Romania	4	4	0	0	1.000
UNICS	Russia	2	0	0	2	.500
Vacallo	Switzerland	2	0	0	2	.000
Varese	Italy	2	1	0	1	.500
Vojvodina	FR Yugoslavia	2	0	0	2	.000
Vršac	Serbia	2	1	0	1	.500
Vytautas	Lithuania	2	1	0	1	.500

== BNXT League ==
On 10 December 2020, it was announced that the Belgian Pro Basketball League and Dutch Basketball League would merge to form a new multinational league, the BNXT League. In this competition, Donar competes regularly against Belgian opponents.

=== By season ===
Season	Pld	W	L	Win%
2021–22	16	9	7	.563
2022–23	12	7	5	.583
2023–24	10	3	7	.300
2024–25	20	4	16	.200
2025–26	20	10	10	.500
2026–27	5	2	3	.400
Total	83	35	48	.422

Italics indicate an ongoing season

=== By club ===
Club	Pld	W	L	Win%
(Belgium) Antwerp Giants	12	5	7	.417
(Belgium) Brussels Basketball	4	1	3	.250
(Belgium) Kangoeroes Mechelen	10	4	6	.400
(Belgium) Kortrijk Spurs	5	2	3	.400
(Belgium) Leuven Bears	7	3	4	.429
(Belgium) Liège Basket	2	1	1	.500
(Belgium) Limburg United	13	6	7	.462
(Belgium) CityX Mons	6	4	2	.667
(Belgium) Okapi Aalst	5	2	3	.400
(Belgium) BC Oostende	10	2	8	.200
(Belgium) Spirou Charleroi	9	5	4	.556
