= CSO Voluntari (basketball) =

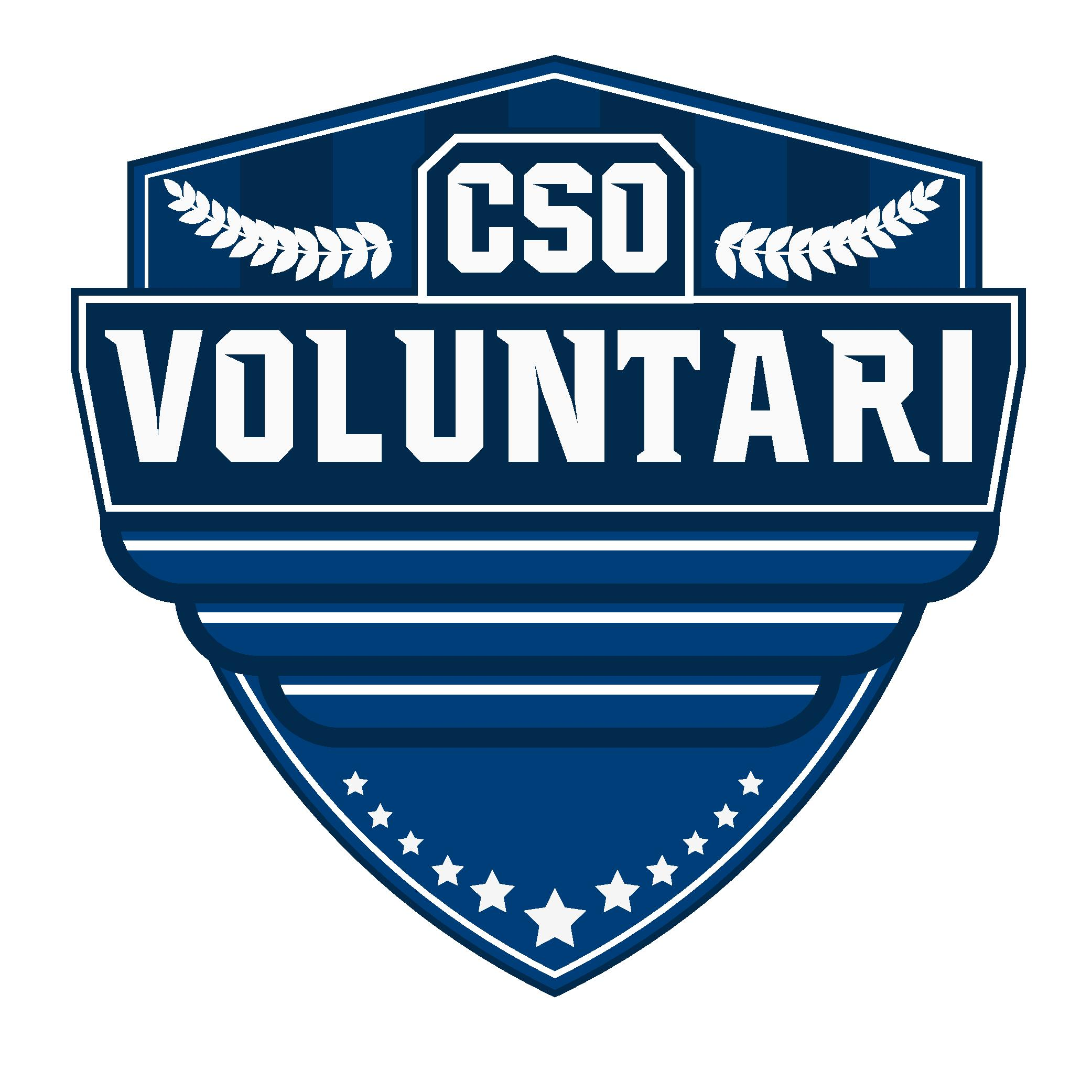
- Leagues: Liga Națională; ENBL
- Founded: 2005; 21 years ago
- Arena: Sala Sp. Gabriela Szabo
- Capacity: 1,100
- Location: Voluntari, Romania
- Team colors: White, Blue
- President: Adrian Moldovan
- Team manager: Ionuț Georgescu
- Head coach: Dan Ioan
- Championships: 3 Romanian Cup; 1 ENBL
- Website: csovoluntari.ro
Home	Away

The basketball section of Clubul Sportiv Orășenesc Voluntari, commonly known as CSO Voluntari or simply Voluntari, is one of the most prominent departments of the Romanian multi-sport club based in Voluntari.

CSO Voluntari earned promotion to Romania’s top basketball division for the first time in 2018. In the years that followed, the club established itself as a competitive presence, winning three Romanian Cup titles (starting in 2021), securing the ENBL title in 2025, and maintaining a consistent spot in the first division.

== Honours ==
=== Domestic competitions ===
- Liga Națională
  - Runners-up (1): 2022
- Romanian Cup
  - Champions (3): 2021, 2022, 2025

=== European competitions ===
- European North Basketball League
  - Champions (1): 2025
  - Runners-up (1): 2024

== Season by season ==
Season	Tier	Division	Pos.	Romanian Cup	European competitions		
2020–21	1	Liga Națională	4th	Champions			
2021–22	1	Liga Națională	Runner-up	Champions	4 Europe Cup	QR	0-1
2022–23	1	Liga Națională	5th	Quarter-finals	3 Champions League	QR	1-1
2023–24	1	Liga Națională	3rd	Quarter-finals	R European North Basketball League	RU	8–3
2024–25	1	Liga Națională	4th	Champions	R European North Basketball League	C	10–2
2025–26	1	Liga Națională	6th	Quarter-finals	R European North Basketball League	4th	10-3
2026–27	1	Liga Națională			R European North Basketball League		0-0

== Current men's basketball roster ==
Note: Flags indicate national team eligibility at FIBA-sanctioned events. Players may hold other non-FIBA nationalities not displayed.

CSO Voluntari roster
Players
Coaches

Pos.	No.	Nat.	Name	Ht.	Age
PG	0	(United States)	Azor, Marcus	1.83 m (6 ft 0 in)	26 – 11 April 2000
PG	2	(Romania)	Somacescu, Tudor	1.87 m (6 ft 2 in)	21 – 15 June 2005
PG	5	(Romania)	Herea, Stefan	1.78 m (5 ft 10 in)	20 – 22 June 2006
SG	6	(Hungary)	Polyak, Laszlo	1.87 m (6 ft 2 in)	33 – 28 May 1993
PF	11	(United States)	Sullivan, Lewis	1.98 m (6 ft 6 in)	31 – 29 May 1995
F	15	(Andorra)	Miseailo, Mihail	1.96 m (6 ft 5 in)	24 – 1 August 2002
C	19	(Romania)	Petrescu, Edward	2.01 m (6 ft 7 in)	27 – 22 February 1999
PF	20	(Romania)	Visan, Matei	2.00 m (6 ft 7 in)	20 – 29 July 2006
SG	21	(Slovenia)	Jones, Andre	1.89 m (6 ft 2 in)	36 – 30 January 1990
C	22	(Romania)	Olah, Alexandru	2.12 m (6 ft 11 in)	33 – 15 October 1993
C	23	(Belgium)	Mukeba, Allen	2.00 m (6 ft 7 in)	25 – 19 September 2001
C	25	(Romania)	Sima, Matei	2.17 m (7 ft 1 in)	18 – 30 July 2008
G	30	(United States)	Rosser, Damion	1.96 m (6 ft 5 in)	27 – 24 August 1999
F	35	(Romania)	Girbea, Tudor	1.96 m (6 ft 5 in)	28 – 16 October 1998
SG	44	(United States)	Justice, Kodi	1.93 m (6 ft 4 in)	31 – 3 April 1995
SF	55	(Bosnia and Herzegovina)	Durmo, Ibrahim	1.97 m (6 ft 6 in)	29 – 15 January 1997

Head coach

- (Romania) Dan Ioan

Assistant coach(es)

- (Serbia) Dean Medan
- (Romania) Alin Sipos

Legend

- (C) Team captain
- Injured

- Roster
Updated: October 13, 2025

=== In Europe ===
Season	Competition	Round	Club	Home	Away	Aggregrate
2021–22	FIBA Europe Cup	Second qualifying round	(Portugal) Benfica	77–83 (in Groningen)		

=== Notable players ===
Note: Flags indicate national team eligibility at FIBA-sanctioned events. Players may hold other non-FIBA nationalities not displayed.

Criteria

To appear in this section a player must have either:

- Set a club record or won an individual award while at the club
- Played at least one official international match for their national team at any time
- Played at least one official NBA match at any time.

- (Romania) Marcu Badiu
- (Romania) Tudor Girbea
- (Romania) Vlad Moldoveanu
- (Romania) Titus Nicoară
- (Romania) Alexandru Olah
- (Romania) Julian Orbeanu
- (Romania) Daniel Popescu
- (Romania) Lucas Tohatan
- (Romania) Rolland Török
- (Croatia) Darko Planinić
- (Lithuania) Šarūnas Vasiliauskas
- (Serbia) Dejan Borovnjak
- (United States) Mike Caffey
