= Darnell Edge =

American basketball player (born 1997)

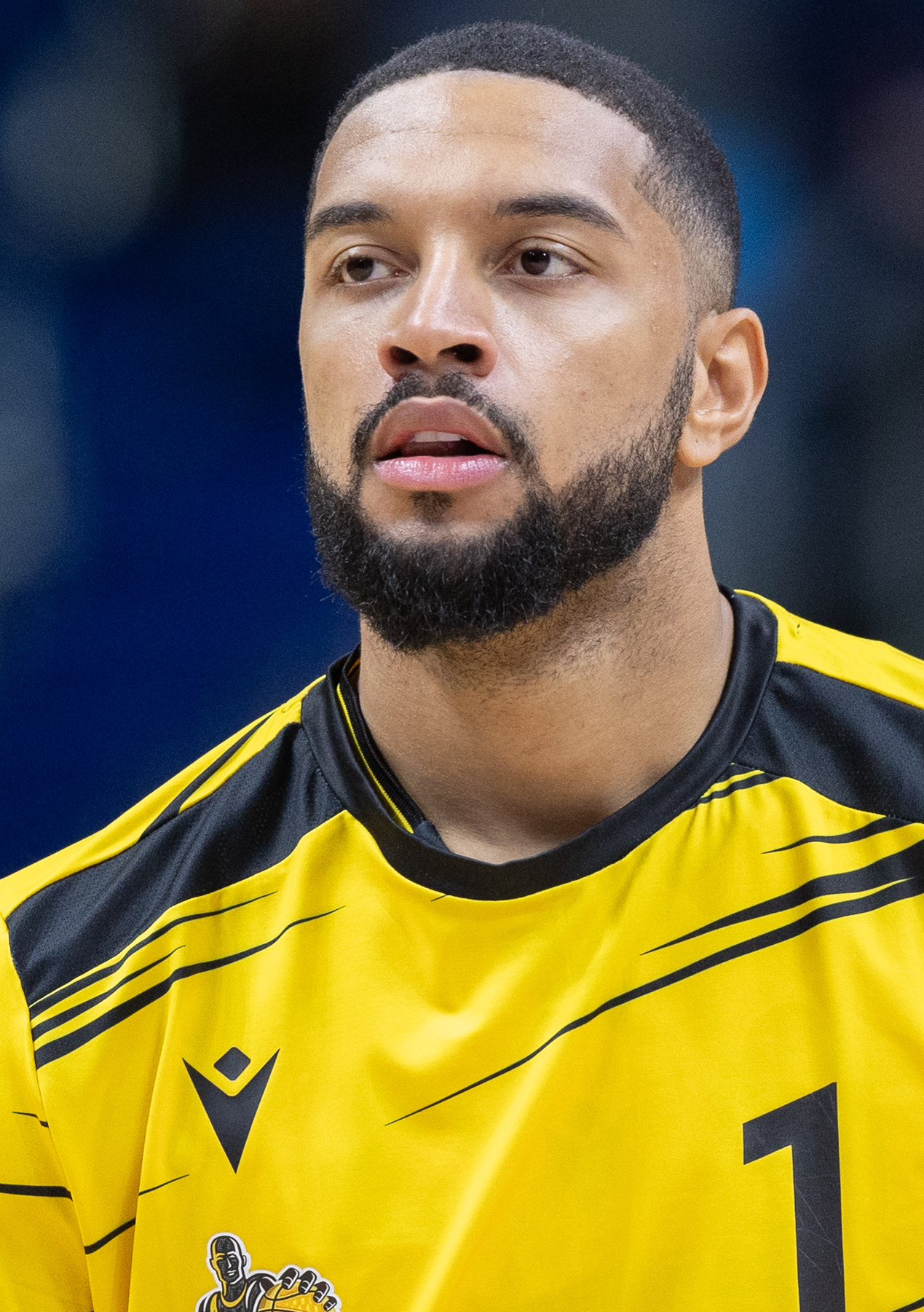
- Edge with Riesen Ludwigsburg in 2025

No. 1 – Balkan Botevgrad
- Position: Point guard
- League: NBL; EuroCup

Personal information
- Born: August 12, 1997 (age 29) Saugerties, New York, U.S.
- Listed height: 6 ft 1 in (1.85 m)
- Listed weight: 195 lb (88 kg)

Career information
- High school: Saugerties (Saugerties, New York)
- College: Fairleigh Dickinson (2015–2019)
- NBA draft: 2019: undrafted
- Playing career: 2019–present

Career history
- 2019: Starogard Gdanski
- 2020–2021: Mykolaiv
- 2021–2022: Gemlik BK
- 2022–2023: Dinamo București
- 2023: Mersin MSK
- 2023–2024: Trepça
- 2024: Indios de San Francisco
- 2024–2025: Ironi Ness Ziona
- 2025: Keravnos
- 2025: Riesen Ludwigsburg
- 2026: Dziki Warsaw
- 2026–present: Balkan Botevgrad

Career highlights
- ENBL champion (2026); Kosovo Superleague champion (2024); Kosovo Superleague Finals MVP (2024); Liga Unike champion (2024); Liga Unike MVP (2024); Kosovo Cup winner (2024); First-team All-NEC (2019); Third-team All-NEC (2018); NEC tournament MVP (2019)

Darnell Antonio Edge (born August 12, 1997) is an American professional basketball player for Balkan Botevgrad of the Bulgarian National Basketball League (NBL) and the EuroCup. He played college basketball for Fairleigh Dickinson, where he was named first-team All-NEC and NEC tournament MVP as a senior. He has played professionally in Poland, Ukraine, Turkey, Romania, Kosovo, Dominican Republic, Israel, Cyprus and Germany. With Trepça in 2024, he helped the team win the Kosovo Superleague championship while earning the Finals MVP award.

== Early life and high school career ==
Edge was born and raised in Saugerties, New York. He attended Saugerties High School, where he was a sophomore varsity player. He went on to lead the Sawyers to back-to-back championships in the Mid-Hudson Athletic League (MHAL) as a junior and senior while earning back-to-back MHAL Division I and II most valuable player honors. The championship in 2013–14 was the school's first ever title.

In 2014–15, the Sawyers won their first Section 9 Class A championship. Edge had 10 points in the win against Red Hook High School in the final. He was subsequently named the Player of the Year by the Hudson Valley chapter of the Basketball Coaches Association of New York (BCANY) for Section 9 Class A. He was also named Freeman Boys Basketball Player of the Year and earned New York State Sportswriters Association Class A boys basketball All-Stars second team honors. He averaged 18.5 points per game and led Class A with an 83.6 percent free-throw percentage.

Edge reached the 1000-point milestone, finishing with 1016 points in his Saugerties career.

== College career ==
=== Freshman season ===
As a freshman at Fairleigh Dickinson in 2015–16, Edge appeared in all 33 games, making one start and averaging 4.4 points per game. He scored a season-high 20 points off the bench against Saint Francis on January 28, 2016.

=== Sophomore season ===
As a sophomore in 2016–17, Edge appeared in all 30 games, making 16 starts and averaging nine points, three rebounds and 1.3 assists per game. He scored a season-high 19 points twice.

=== Junior season ===
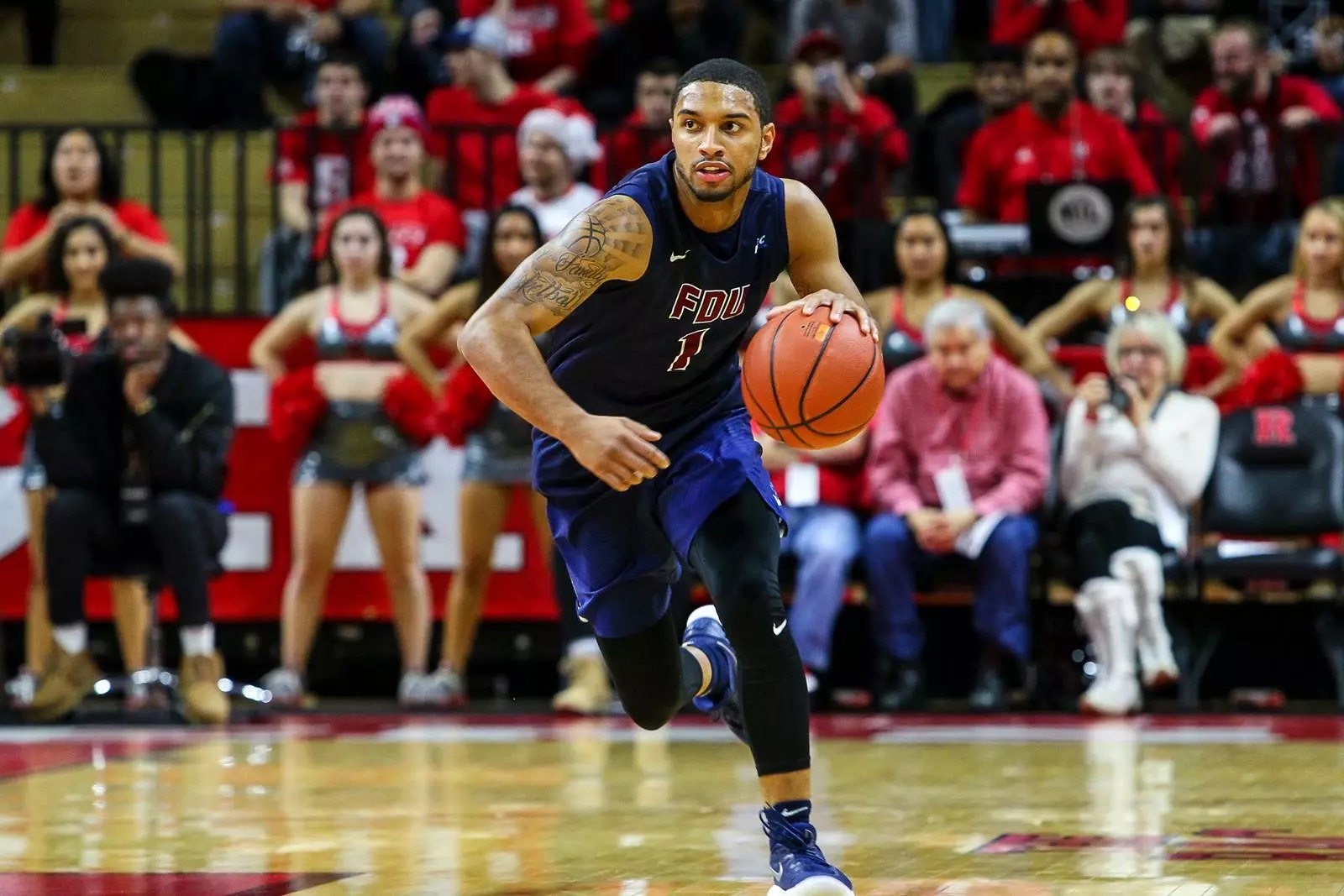
Edge with the FDU Knights in November 2018

As a junior in 2017–18, Edge was named All-NEC Third Team and led the NCAA in Free-Throw Percentage (94.4%). He subsequently became the first Fairleigh Dickinson men's basketball player to lead the NCAA in a category in the program's 68-year history. He started all 30 contests in which he played and averaged 14.5 points, 2.9 rebounds and 2.4 assists in 34.1 minutes per game. On November 18, 2017, he had 18 points and a career high-tying seven steals against Kean University. On January 27, 2018, he scored 21 points with a career-high five 3-pointers against Bryant. He scored a season-high 23 points twice during the season. In the season finale, he suffered a torn patella tendon in his right knee.

=== Senior season ===
As a senior in 2018–19, Edge was named All-NEC First Team and NABC All-District First Team. He was also selected for the Metropolitan Basketball Writer Association's All-Met First Team and was named the NEC tournament MVP in the 2019 tournament. He averaged 16.6 points, 3.5 rebounds and 2.4 assists per game. His 92 3-pointers were the second most in FDU single-season history and his 582 total points were fifth-most in FDU single-season history. He was named NEC Player of the Week on November 26, 2018, after averaging 22.5 points on 53.6 percent shooting from the field, including scoring 28 points against Princeton. He scored 32 points against Bryant on February 16, 2019. He made 11 of 14 shots, including 7 of 8 on 3-pointers. On March 19, he scored a career-high 33 points in an 82–76 win over Prairie View A&M. It marked FDU's first NCAA Tournament win in school history.

Edge finished as the team's 11th all-time leading scorer with a career total of 1,431 points. On December 27, 2019, he was selected to the All-Decade New Jersey college basketball team, an honor given to the top 15 Division I players in New Jersey schools from 2010–2019.

== Professional career ==
After playing for the Utah Jazz in the 2019 NBA Summer League, Edge joined Polish team SKS Starogard Gdanski in August 2019. He played three games for Starogard Gdanski between September 29 and October 12.

For the 2020–21 season, Edge joined Ukrainian team MBC Mykolaiv. In 32 games, he averaged 11.8 points, 2.6 rebounds and 2.1 assists per game.

For the 2021–22 season, Edge joined Gemlik BK of the Turkish Basketball League (TBL). In 30 games, he averaged 22.6 points, 4.0 rebounds, 4.8 assists and 1.1 steals per game.

For the 2022–23 season, Edge joined Romanian team CS Dinamo București. In 25 games, he averaged 12.6 points, 3.0 rebounds and 3.2 assists per game. In April 2023, he joined Mersin MSK in Turkey. In eight games to finish the TBL season, he averaged 16.0 points, 3.6 rebounds, 3.6 assists and 1.0 steals per game.

In November 2023, Edge signed with Trepça for the rest of the 2023–24 Kosovo Basketball Superleague season. He went on to help the team win the Kosovo Cup, the Kosovo Superleague championship, and the Liga Unike championship. He was named Kosovo Superleague Finals MVP and Liga Unike MVP. In the 2023–24 FIBA Europe Cup season, he averaged 21.5 points and 6.0 assists per game.

In June 2024, Edge joined Indios de San Francisco de Macorís of the Liga Nacional de Baloncesto. In nine games, he averaged 7.7 points, 2.1 rebounds and 2.7 assists per game.

On July 14, 2024, Edge signed with Ironi Ness Ziona of the Israeli Basketball Premier League. In 26 games during the 2024–25 season, he averaged 12.1 points, 3.0 rebounds and 4.1 assists per game.

On October 10, 2025, Edge signed with Keravnos of the Cyprus Basketball Division A. He appeared in 11 games for Keravnos between October 15 and November 19, averaging 17.2 points and 4.2 assists across the FIBA Europe Cup and the Cyprus League.

On December 5, 2025, Edge signed with Riesen Ludwigsburg of the Basketball Bundesliga. He appeared in five games between December 6 and December 29, averaging 6.6 points, 1.0 rebounds and 2.4 assists per game.

On January 27, 2026, Edge signed with Dziki Warsaw of the Polish Basketball League (PLK). He led the team to the ENBL championship for the 2025–26 season. He recorded 18 points, five rebounds and five assists against Manchester Basketball in the championship game and averaged 11.7 points on 38.1% three-point shooting, 3.8 assists and 1.2 steals overall in the competition.

On August 12, 2026, Edge signed with Balkan Botevgrad of the Bulgarian National Basketball League (NBL).

== Career statistics ==
Legend
GP	Games played	GS	Games started	MPG	Minutes per game
FG%	Field goal percentage	3P%	3-point field goal percentage	FT%	Free throw percentage
RPG	Rebounds per game	APG	Assists per game	SPG	Steals per game
BPG	Blocks per game	PPG	Points per game	**Bold**	Career high

=== Domestic leagues ===
Year	Team	League	GP	MPG	FG%	3P%	FT%	RPG	APG	SPG	BPG	PPG
2019	(Poland) SKS Starogard Gdański	I liga	3	23.2	31.8	0.0	100.0	2.3	1.3	0.3	0.0	6.3
2020–21	(Ukraine) MBC Mykolaiv	USL	30	24.5	47.8	38.0	91.4	2.7	2.1	0.9	0.0	11.9
2021–22	(Turkey) Gemlik BK	TBL	30	36.3	47.6	35.2	92.2	4.0	4.8	1.1	0.0	22.5
2022–23	(Romania) CS Dinamo București	Liga Națională	25	28.3	52.4	38.8	92.9	3.0	3.2	1.0	0.0	12.6
2023	(Turkey) Mersin MSK	TBL	8	30.4	43.6	44.7	95.0	3.6	3.6	1.0	0.0	16.0
2023–24	(Kosovo) Trepça	Kosovo Superleague	21	32.7	91.7	47.9	100.0	4.2	5.8	1.1	0.0	18.8

=== College ===
Year	Team	GP	GS	MPG	FG%	3P%	FT%	RPG	APG	SPG	BPG	PPG
2015–16	Fairleigh Dickinson	**33**	1	13.2	44.5	42.2	95.0	1.2	0.8	0.3	.0	4.4
2016–17	Fairleigh Dickinson	30	16	28.1	**50.3**	36.6	90.4	3.0	1.3	**0.9**	.0	9.0
2017–18	Fairleigh Dickinson	**30**	**30**	**34.1**	44.9	**36.1**	94.4	**2.9**	**2.4**	**1.3**	.0	**14.5**
2018–19	Fairleigh Dickinson	**35**	**35**	**37.0**	47.3	**47.7**	89.4	**3.5**	**2.4**	**1.3**	.0	**16.6**
Career		128	82	28.1	46.8	41.4	91.5	2.7	1.8	1.0	.0	11.2
