= 2026–27 PLK season =

PLK
- Season: 2026–27
- Dates: 2 October 2026 – June 2027
- Teams: 16
- TV partner: Polsat Sport

The 2026–27 Polish Basketball League (PLK) season, the Orlen Basket Liga for sponsorship reasons, is the 93rd season of the Polish Basketball League, the highest professional basketball league in Poland. Legia Warsaw are the defending champions.

== Teams ==
16 teams will participate this season.

Astoria Bydgoszcz was promoted from Liga I. and Miasto Szkła Krosno was relegated after finishing in the last spot for 2025–26 PLK season.

=== Locations and venues ===
Location of teams in the 2026–27 PLK season

Team	Location	Arena	Capacity
AMW Arka Gdynia	Gdynia	Gdynia Sports Arena	4,010
Anwil Włocławek	Włocławek	Hala Mistrzów	3,963
Arriva Lotto Twarde Pierniki Toruń	Toruń	Kujawsko-Pomorska Arena Toruń	6,248
Dziki Warsaw	Warsaw	Hala Koło	1,298
Enea Łaciate Astoria Bydgoszcz	Bydgoszcz	Grupa Moderator Arena	1,475
Energa Czarni Słupsk	Slupsk	Hala Gryfia	2,249
Energa Trefl Sopot	Sopot	Ergo Arena	11,409
Euvic GTK Gliwice	Gliwice	Gliwice Arena	3,360
Górnik Wałbrzych	Wałbrzych	Aqua Zdrój	2,023
King Wilki Morskie Szczecin	Szczecin	Enea Arena	5,055
Legia Warsaw	Warsaw	OSiR Bemowo	1,991
MKS Dąbrowa Górnicza	Dąbrowa Górnicza	Centrum Hall	2,944
PGE Start Lublin	Lublin	Hala Globus	4,221
Śląsk Wrocław	Wrocław	Hala Orbita	3,000
Tasomix Rosiek Stal Ostrów Wielkopolski	Ostrów Wielkopolski	Arena Ostrów	3,086
Zastal Zielona Góra	Zielona Góra	CRS Hall	5,080

== Regular season ==
=== League table ===
Pos	Team	Pld	W	L	PF	PA	PD	Pts	Qualification or relegation
1	MKS Dąbrowa Górnicza	8	8	0	743	668	+75	16	Advanced to playoffs
2	Dziki Warsaw	8	7	1	718	589	+129	15	Advanced to playoffs
3	Śląsk Wrocław	8	6	2	687	666	+21	14	Advanced to playoffs
4	AMW Arka Gdynia	8	6	2	668	604	+64	14	Advanced to playoffs
5	King Wilki Morskie Szczecin	8	6	2	699	658	+41	14	Advanced to playoffs
6	Enea Łaciate Astoria Bydgoszcz	8	5	3	698	674	+24	13	Advanced to playoffs
7	Zastal Zielona Góra	8	4	4	674	688	−14	12	Advanced to playins
8	Anwil Włocławek	8	4	4	638	653	−15	12	Advanced to playins
9	Arriva Lotto Twarde Pierniki Toruń	8	4	4	717	699	+18	12	Advanced to playins
10	Górnik Wałbrzych	8	4	4	665	643	+22	12	Advanced to playins
11	Euvic GTK Gliwice	8	3	5	622	646	−24	11	
12	Legia Warsaw	8	3	5	619	663	−44	11	
13	Tasomix Rosiek Stal Ostrów Wielkopolski	8	2	6	602	644	−42	10	
14	PGE Start Lublin	8	2	6	618	674	−56	10	
15	Energa Czarni Słupsk	8	0	8	634	720	−86	8	
16	Energa Trefl Sopot	8	0	8	631	744	−113	8	Relegated to I Liga

Updated to match(es) played on November 22, 2026. Source: PLK

=== Results ===
Home \ Away	GDY	ANW	TOR	DZI	BYD	CZA	SOP	GTK	WAL	LEG	MKS	LUB	WRO	STA	SZC	ZIE
AMW Arka Gdynia	—						96–82		88–95	67–60			95–70			
Anwil Włocławek	67–79	—				79–78			88–87					83–82		
Arriva Lotto Twarde Pierniki Toruń			—		110–96		106–76								85–104	87–71
Dziki Warsaw		96–75		—		91–81						97–77				
Enea Łaciate Astoria Bydgoszcz					—	95–58		74–75	91–87			70–62				105–95
Energa Czarni Słupsk	72–84					—				76–79	90–100			84–87		
Energa Trefl Sopot				63–102	87–90		—								81–91	
Euvic GTK Gliwice			90–69				84–77	—			78–89		84–96			76–84
Górnik Wałbrzych				74–71				70–52	—						86–95	
Legia Warsaw		73–72		77–92						—				84–74	78–85	
MKS Dąbrowa Górnicza			87–83				88–82		93–85	93–81	—		97–80			
PGE Start Lublin	76–73		94–101					87–83			89–96	—		79–84		
Śląsk Wrocław			81–76		100–77		87–83						—			91–85
Tasomix Rosiek Stal Ostrów Wielkopolski	82–86			59–73					65–81					—		69–74
King Wilki Morskie Szczecin		80–97				105–95						70–54	69–82		—	
Zastal Zielona Góra		78–77		83–96						104–87						—

Updated to match(es) played on November 22, 2026. Source: PLK
Legend: Blue = home team win; Red = away team win.
Matches with lighter background shading were decided after overtime.

== Awards ==
All official awards of the 2026–27 PLK season.

=== MVP of the Month ===
Month	Player	Team	EFF	Ref.
2026
October	(United States) Jordan Hall	MKS Dąbrowa Górnicza	20.3	

=== MVP of the Round ===
Gameday	Player	Team	EFF	Ref.
1	(United States) Alex Stein	AMW Arka Gdynia	26	
2	(United States) Trazarien White	Zastal Zielona Góra	27	
3	(United States) Daylen Kountz	MKS Dąbrowa Górnicza	18	
4	(United States) Ron Curry	Górnik Wałbrzych	23	
5	(Poland) Krzysztof Kempa	Dziki Warsaw	25	
6	(Poland) Tomasz Gielo	Wilki Morskie Szczecin	23	
7	(United States) TJ Starks	PGE Start Lublin	35	

== Polish clubs in European competitions ==
Team	Competition	Progress
Śląsk Wrocław	EuroCup	Regular Season
Legia Warsaw	Champions League	Regular Season
Dziki Warsaw	Champions League	Qualifying rounds
Dziki Warsaw	FIBA Europe Cup	Regular Season
Orlen Zielona Góra	FIBA Europe Cup	Regular Season
Wilki Morskie Szczecin	FIBA Europe Cup	Regular Season

== Polish clubs in Regional competitions ==
Team	Competition	Progress
Anwil Wloclawek	European North Basketball League	Regular season
