= 2026–27 Basketball Bundesliga =

Basketball Bundesliga
- Season: 2026–27
- Dates: 18 September 2026 – 11 June 2027
- Teams: 18

Seasons
- ← 2025–26 2027–28 →

The 2026–27 Basketball Bundesliga, known as the easyCredit BBL for sponsorship reasons, is the 61st season of the Basketball Bundesliga (BBL), the top-tier level of professional club basketball in Germany. It runs from September 2026 to June 2027.

== Format ==
After a double round-robin, the top six teams from the regular season qualify for the playoffs. Teams placed seven to ten will be entered into a play-in tournament for the final two seeds of the playoffs.

== Teams ==
Location of teams in 2026–27 Basketball Bundesliga

=== Team changes ===
Of the ProA finalists, only Phoenix Hagen applied for a license, which meant that there was a wildcard scenario for the 18th team. The Basketball Löwen Braunschweig purchased this wildcard and will stay in the Bundesliga, after being originally relegated last year.

Promoted from 2025–26 ProA	Relegated from 2025–26 Basketball Bundesliga
Phoenix Hagen	MLP Academics Heidelberg

=== Arenas and locations ===
Team	City	Arena	Capacity
Bamberg Baskets	Bamberg	Brose Arena	6,150
Alba Berlin	Berlin	Uber Arena	14,500
Telekom Baskets Bonn	Bonn	Telekom Dome	6,000
Löwen Braunschweig	Braunschweig	Volkswagen Halle	6,600
Niners Chemnitz	Chemnitz	Chemnitz Arena	5,200
Skyliners Frankfurt	Frankfurt	Süwag Energie ARENA	5,002
Phoenix Hagen	Hagen	Krollmann Arena	3,145
Veolia Towers Hamburg	Hamburg	Inselpark Arena	3,400
Science City Jena	Jena	Sparkassen-Arena	3,000
MHP Riesen Ludwigsburg	Ludwigsburg	MHP-Arena	5,300
Syntainics MBC	Weißenfels	Stadthalle Weißenfels	3,000
Bayern Munich	Munich	BMW Park	6,700
EWE Baskets Oldenburg	Oldenburg	Große EWE Arena	6,069
Rostock Seawolves	Rostock	Stadthalle Rostock	4,550
Vet-Concept Gladiators Trier	Trier	SWT-Arena	5,495
ratiopharm Ulm	Neu-Ulm	ratiopharm arena	6,000
Rasta Vechta	Vechta	Rasta Dome	3,140
Fitness First Würzburg Baskets	Würzburg	Tectake Arena	3,140

== Regular season ==
=== Standings ===
Pos	Team	Pld	W	L	PF	PA	PD	Pts	Qualification or relegation
1	Bayern Munich	10	9	1	949	701	+248	18	Playoffs
2	Rostock Seawolves	10	7	3	890	801	+89	14	Playoffs
3	Vet-Concept Gladiators Trier	9	7	2	868	781	+87	14	Playoffs
4	Telekom Baskets Bonn	10	7	3	878	805	+73	14	Playoffs
5	MHP Riesen Ludwigsburg	10	6	4	871	854	+17	12	Playoffs
6	Syntainics MBC	10	6	4	841	828	+13	12	Playoffs
7	Skyliners Frankfurt	8	5	3	695	673	+22	10	Play-in
8	Bamberg Baskets	10	5	5	848	846	+2	10	Play-in
9	Alba Berlin	10	5	5	864	869	−5	10	Play-in
10	Niners Chemnitz	10	4	6	901	879	+22	8	Play-in
11	Fitness First Würzburg Baskets	9	4	5	745	762	−17	8	
12	Ratiopharm Ulm	10	4	6	820	845	−25	8	
13	Rasta Vechta	10	4	6	848	894	−46	8	
14	Veolia Towers Hamburg	10	4	6	847	909	−62	8	
15	EWE Baskets Oldenburg	10	4	6	746	837	−91	8	
16	Basketball Löwen Braunschweig	10	3	7	842	965	−123	6	
17	Phoenix Hagen	10	2	8	845	925	−80	4	Relegation to ProA
18	Science City Jena	10	2	8	768	892	−124	4	Relegation to ProA

Updated to match(es) played on 22 November 2026. Source: BBL
Rules for classification: 1) points; 2) head-to-head points; 3) head-to-head points difference; 4) head-to-head number of points scored.

== Results ==
Home \ Away	BAM	BER	BON	BRA	CHE	FRA	HAG	HAM	JEN	LUD	MBC	MUN	OLD	ROS	TRI	ULM	VEC	WUR
Bamberg Baskets	—		71–85						88–78	96–103	74–85							
Alba Berlin	83–98	—			89–82	94–83	102–72					79–90				98–82		
Telekom Baskets Bonn		95–88	—	97–87				96–72	115–68		77–74					89–72		
Basketball Löwen Braunschweig	75–82			—						98–107				83–82	116–107			72–96
Niners Chemnitz				111–79	—		94–93			94–78		83–87						
Skyliners Frankfurt						—		89–78							85–99		93–81	
Phoenix Hagen				88–73		88–93	—			79–93						78–93	74–100	
Veolia Towers Hamburg					94–90		97–94	—			89–107			84–91				91–84
Science City Jena					82–76	82–93		87–91	—					67–86			79–71	
MHP Riesen Ludwigsburg			84–68							—	96–87		72–74	81–78	80–94			
Syntainics MBC						77–73			77–62		—			103–98		89–72		
Bayern Munich	108–72	95–61		108–66				96–77			91–61	—	113–60					
EWE Baskets Oldenburg	70–80	77–95				74–86	78–87	75–74			96–81		—					
Rostock Seawolves							102–92					69–67		—		97–87	86–75	101–62
Vet-Concept Gladiators Trier	92–79	95–75	106–80		80–93				98–85						—			
Ratiopharm Ulm									97–78	86–77			81–65			—		67–90
Rasta Vechta	67–108			87–93	99–90										88–97	84–83	—	
Fitness First Würzburg Baskets			83–76		98–88							73–94	68–77				91–96	—

Updated to match(es) played on 22 November 2026. Source: BBL
Legend: Blue = home team win; Red = away team win.

== Playoffs ==
=== Play-in ===
The teams ranked 7 to 10 will play in a play-in round.

Play-in games
7
8
9
10

No. 8 seed game

Final seeds
No. 7 seed
No. 8 seed

Bold Game winner
Italic Team with home-court advantage

=== Bracket ===
The rounds will be played in a best-of-five format. All games will be played in a best-of-five format in a 2-2-1 format for each series.

Quarterfinals
1
8
4
5
2
7
3
6

Semifinals

Finals

== German clubs in European competitions ==
Team	Competition	Result
Bayern Munich	EuroLeague	Regular season
Niners Chemnitz	EuroCup	Regular season
ratiopharm Ulm	EuroCup	Regular season
FRAPORT Skyliners	EuroCup	Regular season
Rostock Seawolves	EuroCup	Regular season
Alba Berlin	Champions League	Regular season
Bamberg Baskets	Champions League	Regular season
Telekom Baskets Bonn	Champions League	Regular season
Fitness First Würzburg Baskets	Champions League	Qualifying tournament
Rasta Vechta	Champions League	Regular season
Vet-Concept Gladiators Trier	FIBA Europe Cup	Regular season
Würzburg Baskets	FIBA Europe Cup	Regular season
SYNTAINICS MBC	ENBL	Regular season
