= Isaiah Cousins =

American basketball player (born 1994)

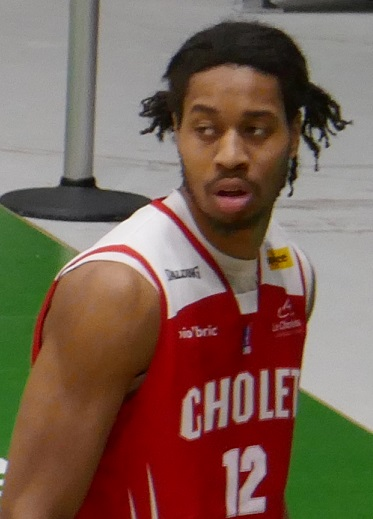
- Cousins with Cholet in 2018

No. 1 – Twarde Pierniki Toruń
- Position: Point guard / shooting guard
- League: PLK

Personal information
- Born: March 13, 1994 (age 32) Mount Vernon, New York, U.S.
- Listed height: 6 ft 4 in (1.93 m)
- Listed weight: 191 lb (87 kg)

Career information
- High school: Mount Vernon (Mount Vernon, New York)
- College: Oklahoma (2012–2016)
- NBA draft: 2016: 2nd round, 59th overall pick
- Drafted by: Sacramento Kings
- Playing career: 2016–present

Career history
- 2016–2017: Reno Bighorns
- 2017–2018: Salt Lake City Stars
- 2018: Cholet Basket
- 2018–2019: Salt Lake City Stars
- 2019–2020: Hapoel Jerusalem
- 2020: Peristeri
- 2020–2021: Hapoel Gilboa Galil
- 2022: BC Kalev
- 2022: Maine Celtics
- 2022–2023: Maccabi Rishon LeZion
- 2023: Hapoel Haifa
- 2023–2024: Krka
- 2024: KK Bosna
- 2024–2025: Inter Bratislava
- 2025–2026: Bashkimi
- 2026–present: Twarde Pierniki Toruń

Career highlights
- ENBL MVP (2025); Israeli League Cup winner (2019); Third-team All-Big 12 (2016); First-team Parade All-American (2012)
- Stats at Basketball Reference

Isaiah De Vonte Cousins (born March 13, 1994) is an American professional basketball player for Twarde Pierniki Toruń of the Polish Basketball League (PLK). He played college basketball for the University of Oklahoma before playing professionally in the NBA G League, France and Israel.

== High school career ==
Cousins played high school basketball for Mount Vernon under Bob Cimmino. As a senior, he averaged 15.8 points, 4.4 rebounds, 4.2 assists and 3.0 steals per game, leading Mount Vernon to a 23–3 record and second straight New York Public High School Athletic Association Class AA state championship. When he graduated, he was a three-star recruit by Rivals.com and New York's Section 1 "Mr. Basketball".

== College career ==
A native of Mount Vernon, New York, Cousins was only a two-star prospect out of high school. He played four seasons for Oklahoma, mostly at shooting guard and only switching to the point as a senior. As a senior, he paired with Buddy Hield to lead the Sooners to the Final Four while averaging 12.6 points, 4.5 assists and 1.4 steals per game. He earned third-team All-Big 12 honors.

== Professional career ==
=== Reno Bighorns (2016–2017) ===
On June 23, 2016, Cousins was selected by the Sacramento Kings with the 59th overall pick in the 2016 NBA draft and later joined them for the 2016 NBA Summer League. On September 6, he signed with the Kings, but was waived on October 24 after appearing in two preseason games. Seven days later, he was acquired by the Reno Bighorns of the NBA Development League as an affiliate player of the Kings.

=== Salt Lake City Stars (2017–2018) ===
On October 19, 2017, the Salt Lake City Stars announced that they had acquired the returning player rights to Cousins, along with the 33rd overall pick in the 2017 NBA G League Draft in exchange for the first-round pick (second overall) of the team.

=== Cholet Basket (2018) ===
On April 11, 2018, Cholet Basket of the LNB Pro A announced they had signed Cousins for the rest of the season.

=== Salt Lake City Stars (2018–2019) ===
On October 3, 2018, Cousins signed with the Utah Jazz. After appearing in three preseason games, he was waived on October 14. He was subsequently added to the roster of their G League affiliate, the Salt Lake City Stars.

=== Hapoel Jerusalem (2019–2020) ===
On July 24, 2019, Cousins signed a one-year deal with Hapoel Jerusalem of the Israeli Premier League, joining his former college teammate TaShawn Thomas. On January 1, 2020, he parted ways with Jerusalem after appearing in nine Champions League games.

=== Peristeri (2020) ===
On January 1, 2020, Cousins signed with Peristeri of the Greek Basket League for the rest of the season.

=== Hapoel Gilboa Galil (2020–2021) ===
On July 31, 2020, Cousins signed with Hapoel Gilboa Galil of the Israeli Basketball Premier League for the upcoming season.

=== Aris Thessaloniki (2021) ===
On November 2, 2021, he signed with Aris of the Greek Basket League. Due to an injury, however, he was not able to participate in the team's activities and parted ways with them soon after.

=== Kalev/Cramo Tallinn (2022) ===
On January 26, 2022, Cousins signed with Estonian side Kalev/Cramo of the Latvian-Estonian Basketball League and VTB United League.

=== Maine Celtics (2022) ===
On March 3, 2022, Cousins was acquired via waivers by the Maine Celtics.

=== Maccabi Rishon LeZion (2022–2023) ===
On August 10, 2022, he signed with Maccabi Rishon LeZion of the Liga Leumit.

=== Hapoel Hafia (2023) ===
On March 19, 2023, he signed with Hapoel Haifa of the Israeli Basketball Premier League.

=== Twarde Pierniki Toruń (2026–present) ===
On March 1, 2026, he signed with Twarde Pierniki Toruń of the Polish Basketball League (PLK).

== Personal life ==
The son of Lisa Cousins, he majored in human relations.
