= Alexandru Olah =

Romanian basketball player (born 1993)

No. 22 – CSO Voluntari
- Position: Center
- League: Liga Națională

Personal information
- Born: 15 October 1993 (age 33) Timișoara, Romania
- Listed height: 6 ft 11 in (2.11 m)
- Listed weight: 264 lb (120 kg)

Career information
- College: Northwestern (2012–2016)
- NBA draft: 2016: undrafted
- Playing career: 2016–present

Career history
- 2016–2017: Belfius Mons-Hainaut
- 2017: U-BT Cluj-Napoca
- 2018: ZZ Leiden
- 2018–2019: Kangoeroes Mechelen
- 2019–2020: Breogán
- 2020–2022: BC Timișoara
- 2022–2023: CS Rapid
- 2023–Present: CSO Voluntari

Alexandru Lucian Olah (born 15 October 1993) is a Romanian basketball player for CSO Voluntari of the Liga Națională. He also plays for the Romanian national team.

== Professional career ==
On 20 January 2018, Olah signed a 2-week try-out contract with ZZ Leiden of the Dutch Basketball League (DBL). On 4 February, Leiden signed him for the remainder of the season.

== International career ==
Olah participated at the EuroBasket 2017.
