= 2023–24 European North Basketball League =

Third season of the European North Basketball League

European North Basketball League
- Season: 2023–24
- Duration: 19 September 2023 – 10 April 2024
- Games played: 68
- Teams: 16

Regular season
- Season MVP: (United States) Rickey McGill

Finals
- Champions: (Denmark) Bakken Bears (1st title)
- Runners-up: (Romania) CSO Voluntari
- Third place: (Belgium) Royal Liege Basket
- Fourth place: (Lithuania) Šiauliai

Statistical leaders
Points	(United States) Seneca Knight	20.7
Rebounds	(United States) Geoffrey Groselle	9.5
Assists	(Puerto Rico) Ángel Rodríguez	8.3

Records
- Biggest home win: Tartu Ülikool Maks & Moorits 83–41 Svendborg Rabbits (9 January 2024)
- Biggest away win: Svendborg Rabbits 62–102 Polski Cukier Start Lublin (8 November 2023)
- Highest scoring: Enea Zastal Zielona Gora 106–100 Valmiera Glass ViA (31 October 2023)
- Winning streak: 6 games Uniclub Casino Juventus
- Losing streak: 7 games Valmiera Glass ViA

2023–24 European North Basketball League was the third season of the European North Basketball League, a regional basketball competition patronised by FIBA. It was won by Bakken Bears, after defeating CSO Voluntari in the final 85–81.

== Teams ==
There were 16 teams participating from 11 countries (Belgium, Netherlands, Poland, Lithuania, Latvia, Estonia, Czech Republic, Denmark, Bulgaria, Romania and UK) and the regular season was divided into two groups. Four teams from each group advanced to play-offs.

There were new teams added to the league – Belgium, Netherlands, Denmark, Bulgaria, Romania and UK all debuted in this competition, while Russian and Belarusian teams were still banned, due to the ongoing 2022 Russian invasion of Ukraine.

1st, 2nd, 3rd etc. – positions in national championships.

Regular season
(Denmark) Bakken Bears (1st)	(Lithuania) Uniclub Casino Juventus (5th)	(United Kingdom) Bristol Flyers (3rd)	(Czech Republic) Brno (5th)
(Denmark) Svendborg Rabbits (5th)	(Lithuania) Šiauliai (9th)	(United Kingdom) Newcastle Eagles (8th)	(Latvia) Valmiera Glass ViA (15th)
(Estonia) Tartu Ülikool Maks & Moorits (2nd)	(Poland) Enea Zastal Zielona Gora (9th)	(Belgium) Royal Liege Basket (9th)	(Netherlands) Landstede Hammers (5th)
(Estonia) Keila Coolbet (7th)	(Poland) Polski Cukier Start Lublin (13th)	(Bulgaria) Spartak Pleven (5th)	(Romania) CSO Voluntari (5th)
(Israel) ~~Hapoel Be'er Sheva-Dimona~~ (8th)	(Kosovo) ~~KB Prishtina~~		

KB Prishtina was originally supposed to participate in this tournament, however they were excluded from the competition, due to the unfulfilled financial obligations. Hapoel Be'er Sheva withdrew due to the Gaza war.

== Regular season ==
=== Group A ===
Pos	Team	Pld	W	L	PF	PA	PD	Pts	Qualification	JUV	BAK	TAR	FLY	HAM	LUB	RAB	SPA
1	(Lithuania) Uniclub Casino Juventus	7	6	1	640	536	+104	13	Advance to Playoffs	—	87–95	88–63	—	84–56	—	110–92	—
2	(Denmark) Bakken Bears	7	5	2	609	544	+65	12	Advance to Playoffs	—	—	—	—	52–56	91–98	—	87–70
3	(Estonia) Tartu Ülikool Maks & Moorits	7	4	3	551	529	+22	11	Advance to Playoffs	—	71–94	—	79–72	—	—	83–41	83–71
4	(United Kingdom) Bristol Flyers	7	4	3	581	519	+62	11	Advance to Playoffs	75–76	83–87	—	—	68–56	—	—	—
5	(Netherlands) Landstede Hammers	7	4	3	502	534	−32	11		—	—	78–97	—	—	—	77–62	86–80
6	(Poland) Polski Cukier Start Lublin	7	3	4	629	632	−3	10		73–103	—	85–75	85–107	91–93	—	—	—
7	(Denmark) Svendborg Rabbits	7	1	6	482	638	−156	8		—	79–103	—	63–86	—	62–102	—	83–77
8	(Bulgaria) Spartak Pleven	7	1	6	554	616	−62	8		82–92	—	—	73–90	—	101–95	—	—

Source: enbleague.eu

=== Group B ===
Pos	Team	Pld	W	L	PF	PA	PD	Pts	Qualification	SIA	VOL	EAG	LIE	ZZG	KEI	BRN	VAL
1	(Lithuania) Šiauliai	7	6	1	658	578	+80	13	Advance to Playoffs	—	85–77	94–92	—	—	107–79	88–70	—
2	(Romania) CSO Voluntari	7	6	1	596	509	+87	13	Advance to Playoffs	—	—	84–76	89–68	97–77	—	—	—
3	(United Kingdom) Newcastle Eagles	7	5	2	623	589	+34	12	Advance to Playoffs	—	—	—	100–92	86–80	—	87–81	—
4	(Belgium) Royal Liege Basket	7	4	3	624	587	+37	11	Advance to Playoffs	74–97	—	—	—	102–79	—	—	97–68
5	(Poland) Enea Zastal Zielona Gora	7	4	3	632	633	−1	11		109–83	—	—	—	—	95–91	86–74	106–100
6	(Estonia) Keila	7	2	5	589	636	−47	9		—	53–82	84–92	92–96	—	—	—	—
7	(Czech Republic) Brno	7	1	6	522	598	−76	8		—	72–75	—	62–95	—	73–93	—	90–74
8	(Latvia) Valmiera Glass ViA	7	0	7	562	676	−114	7		77–104	78–92	74–90	—	—	91–97	—	—

Source: enbleague.eu

== Playoffs ==
Each tie in the quarter-finals phase was played over two legs. The winning teams qualified for the Final Four tournament.

=== Quarterfinals ===
Team 1	Agg.	Team 2	1st leg	2nd leg
Uniclub Casino Juventus (Lithuania)	180–182	(Belgium) Royal Liege Basket	84–95	96–87
CSO Voluntari (Romania)	168–152	(Estonia) Tartu Ülikool Maks & Moorits	76–83	92–69
Bakken Bears (Denmark)	188–179	(United Kingdom) Newcastle Eagles	92–87	96–92 (OT)
Šiauliai (Lithuania)	174–155	(United Kingdom) Bristol Flyers	84–76	90–79

=== Final Four ===
Final Four took place in Sparekassen Danmark Basketball Center, Aarhus on April 9–10.

Semifinals
9 April
(Belgium) Royal Liege Basket	79
(Romania) CSO Voluntari	80
9 April
(Lithuania) Šiauliai	77
(Denmark) Bakken Bears	90

Championship game
10 April
(Romania) CSO Voluntari	81
(Denmark) Bakken Bears	85
Third place game
10 April
(Belgium) Royal Liege Basket	83
(Lithuania) Šiauliai	73
