= 2021–22 European North Basketball League =

European North Basketball League
- Season: 2021–22
- Duration: 19 October 2021–7 April 2022
- Teams: 8
- TV partner: Best4Sport TV

Regular season
- Season MVP: (United States) Hunter Mickelson

Finals
- Champions: (Poland) Anwil Włocławek (1st title)
- Runners-up: (Lithuania) Šiauliai
- Third place: (Czech Republic) Brno
- Fourth place: (Estonia) Tartu Ulikool Maks & Moorits

Records
- Biggest home win: Anwil Włocławek 116–55 Liepāja (9 February 2022)
- Biggest away win: Liepāja 64–104 Brno (2 March 2022)
- Highest scoring: BC Šiauliai 104–107 BC Brno (28 December 2021)
- Winning streak: 7 games Anwil Włocławek
- Losing streak: 5 games Valmiera Glass ViA

2021–22 European North Basketball League was the first season of the European North Basketball League, a regional basketball competition patronised by FIBA. The tournament began on October 19, 2021.

== Competition format ==
A round robin tournament – at least seven games in three stages (3+2+2), followed by the Final Four in Spring of 2022. There was no games during FIBA international windows for the National teams (November 22–30, 2021; February 21-March 1, 2022). Final Four tournament was held at Włocławek.

== Teams ==
Team	Home city	Arena	Capacity
(Poland) Anwil Włocławek	Włocławek	Hala Mistrzów	4200
(Czech Republic) Brno	Brno	Sportovní hala Sokola Brno	1100
(Belarus) Borisfen	Mogilev	Olympic Stadium	2740
(Russia) Enisey	Krasnoyarsk	Arena Sever	4100
(Latvia) Liepāja	Liepāja	Liepāja Olympic Center	2542
(Lithuania) Šiauliai	Šiauliai	Šiauliai Arena	5700
(Estonia) Tartu Ülikool Maks & Moorits	Tartu	University of Tartu Sports Hall	1650
(Latvia) Valmiera Glass VIA	Valmiera	Vidzeme Olympic Center	1500

== Regular season ==
Pos	Team	Pld	W	L	PF	PA	PD	PCT	Qualification or relegation
1	(Poland) Anwil Włocławek	5	5	0	468	346	+122	1.000	Advance to Final 4
2	(Czech Republic) Brno	5	4	1	459	412	+47	.800	Advance to Final 4
3	(Lithuania) Šiauliai	5	3	2	438	436	+2	.600	Advance to Final 4
4	(Estonia) Tartu Ülikool Maks & Moorits	5	2	3	333	358	−25	.400	Advance to Final 4
5	(Latvia) Liepāja	5	1	4	335	433	−98	.200	
6	(Latvia) Valmiera Glass VIA	5	0	5	355	403	−48	.000	
7	(Russia) BC Enisey^{1}	0	0	0	0	0	0	—	Excluded
8	(Belarus) Borisfen^{1}	0	0	0	0	0	0	—	Excluded

Source: enbleague.eu

^{1}Participation of Russian and Belarusian teams suspended due to the 2022 Russian invasion of Ukraine. Thus, according to article D.5.1 of the FIBA Official Basketball Rules, all their results in the relevant phases were annulled.

== Final Four ==
Semifinals
6 Apr
(Poland) Anwil Włocławek	80
(Estonia) Tartu Ülikool Maks & Moorits	74
6 Apr
(Czech Republic) Brno	73
(Lithuania) Šiauliai	84

Final
7 Apr
(Poland) Anwil Włocławek	90
(Lithuania) Šiauliai	79
Third place game
7 Apr
(Estonia) Tartu Ülikool Maks & Moorits	76
(Czech Republic) Brno	80
