= Ionuț Georgescu =

Romanian basketball manager (born 1988)

Lucentum Alicante
- Position: COO Lucentum Alicante
- League: Primera FEB

Personal information
- Born: 25 July 1988 (age 38) Ploiești, Prahova County, Romania

Career highlights
- As executive: Liga Națională 2011 2nd place; Liga Națională 2012 Champion; Liga Națională 2013 Champion; Liga Națională 2014 Champion; Liga Națională 2015 Champion; Romanian Supercup 2015 Winner; Liga Națională 2016 3rd place; Liga Națională 2017 2nd place; Liga Națională 2018 2nd place; Romanian Cup 2019 Winner; Liga Națională 2019 2nd place; Romanian Cup 2021 Winner; Romanian Cup 2022 Winner; Liga Națională 2022 2nd place; ENBL 2024 2nd place; Romanian Cup 2025 Winner; ENBL 2025 1st place

Ioan Costin Georgescu (born 25 July 1988) is a Romanian basketball manager. He is the current COO (Director de Operaciones) Lucentum Alicante

Georgescu began writing for a sport weekly at age 15, making him Romania's youngest sports journalist at the time.

== CSU Asesoft Ploiesti ==
At the age of 17, Georgescu became a press officer for CSU Asesoft Ploiești, the powerhouse of Romanian basketball. From the bottom to the top, he advanced to be team manager, delegate for the European competitions, general manager, and, at the age of 21, executive president of the club. The youngest in the European basketball! He developed programs such as the Junior Academy Asesoft Ploiesti, Basketball in schools, the annual memorial for Toni Alexe – ex-captain of CSU Asesoft, who died in a car accident in 2005, before the team won the FIBA Europe Cup Men – and various public relations events.

Besides his activity in the domestic competition, Georgescu was the only Romanian delegate designated to work with Euroleague Basketball, being responsible for the organization of 4 Eurocup campaigns, after his clubs won wild cards, coming from a country where basketball does not have professional status.

At the age of 27, he moved to Steaua CSM EximBank Bucharest after his home team went bankrupt because of several political issues.

== Steaua CSM Eximbank ==
Georgescu succeeded in obtaining a Eurocup wild card with his new club, which saw two victories: against the Turkish team Trabzonspor and the Adriatic League leader at that moment, Buducnost Podgorica. From that group were part also Aris Salonic, Unics Kazan and Banvit Bandirma.

In the season 2015/2016, Steaua led the regular season and the Top 6 to finish with the bronze medal, its best result since 2011. Also, having a 1300 juniors program, the club took the crown for U16 and U18 categories. In the season 2016/2017, Steaua was the runner-up of the Regular Season, semifinalist of the Romanian Cup, and just 1/6 in the regular season of FIBA Europe Cup. The team advanced in the Finals of the League after 21 years, but was defeated by U BT Cluj Napoca by 3-0, even the first two games in Cluj were decided in the last seconds.

== BC CSU SIBIU ==
Georgescu signed with BC CSU SIBIU in August 2018 The club finished on 1st position the Regular Season and the Top 6 in Liga Nationala On 19 April, BC CSU Sibiu won the Romanian Cup, after a Final against CSM Oradea 88-78. This was the first Cup in the club's history and the first trophy for Sibiu after 20 years. In the same season, BC CSU Sibiu played the Finals of the Romanian National League, losing 1-3 against CSM Oradea, and qualifying to FIBA Europe Cup regular season.

== Scouter for Real Betis Baloncesto ==
In April 2020, Georgescu reached a collaboration agreement with Real Betis Baloncesto. According to the Club, the partnership is aiming for a multi-year project, placing Georgescu in the scouting role for the Eastern Europe area and, in particular, in Romania.

== CSO Voluntari ==
In July 2020, Georgescu signed a two-year deal with CSO Voluntari. On March 9, 2021, CSO Voluntari won the Romanian Cup 2021. In the Final 8 that took place in Cluj-Napoca, CSO Voluntari defeated FC Argeș in quarterfinals (75-74), SCM Craiova in semifinals (81-80) and CSM Oradea in the Finals (72-65) CSO Voluntari succeeded in defending the Romanian Cup in 2022. On its way to the trophy, Voluntari defeated U BT Cluj Napoca (81-80), in the semifinals, and the host of the Final 4, SCM U Craiova (89-75), in the final game. At the end of the season 2023/2024, Georgescu announced that he was leaving Romania to go abroad, remaining involved only as a scouter & adviser for CSO Voluntari, after reaching the first European Cup finals in the club's history and finishing the National League with the bronze medals.

== Lucentum Alicante ==
In May 2024, Georgescu signed a three-year deal with Lucentum Alicante, as Technical Director, assisting the Sports Director of the Club, Asier Alonso Sanz, and coordinating Lucentum Basket Academy and the international project Lucentum Basketball HUB. In 2026, he was promoted as COO of the HLA Lucentum Alicante.
