= KK Dinamo Zagreb =

Basketball club in Zagreb, Croatia

Dinamo Zagreb
- Leagues: Premijer liga
- Founded: 1972; 54 years ago
- History: KK Rudeš; 1972–2020; KK Dinamo Zagreb; 2020–present
- Arena: Dražen Petrović Basketball Hall
- Capacity: 5,400
- Location: Zagreb, Croatia
- Team colors: Blue, White
- President: Marijan Pojatina
- Head coach: Damir Mulaomerović
- Website: kkdinamo.hr
Home	Away

KK Dinamo Zagreb is a professional basketball club from Zagreb, Croatia. Founded in 1972 as KK Rudeš, in 2020, the club changed its name and logo to KK Dinamo Zagreb. The team plays in the Premijer liga, the highest division of professional basketball in Croatia.

== History ==
The club was founded in 1972 as KK Rudeš by basketball enthusiasts from Rudeš, a neighborhood in western Zagreb.

Rudeš spent the following decades in lower-tier leagues within Yugoslavia and later Croatia. In 2006 the club struggled with financial difficulties and was on the verge of bankruptcy. With new management, supported by young enthusiasts, football fans of GNK Dinamo and Mladen Miholić, the club overcame its problems.

Croatian coach Neven Spahija recognised club's potential and became vice president in 2011. The club won medals in youth categories and qualification of senior team to the First men's basketball league.

The club's name and management changed. The club gained support by the Bad Blue Boys. The name changed on May 13, 2020.

Team competes in Croatian Basketball Premier League and Alpe Adria Cup.

== Season by season ==
Season	Tier	Division	Pos.	Croatian Cup	European competitions		
2025–26	1	Premijer liga	11th	Quarterfinalist	R European North Basketball League	QF	6-4
