= 2024–25 European North Basketball League =

Fourth season of the European North Basketball League

European North Basketball League
- Season: 2024–25
- Duration: 17 September 2024 – 9 April 2025
- Games played: 84
- Teams: 18

Regular season
- Season MVP: (United States) Isaiah Cousins

Finals
- Champions: (Romania) CSO Voluntari (1st title)
- Runners-up: (United Kingdom) Newcastle Eagles
- Third place: (Poland) Dziki Warsaw
- Fourth place: (Slovakia) Inter Bratislava
- Finals MVP: (United States) Mike Caffey

Records
- Biggest home win: CSO Voluntari 113–64 Tartu Ülikool Maks & Moorits (7 January 2025)
- Biggest away win: Keila Coolbet 48–82 Bakken Bears (15 October 2024)
- Highest scoring: Brno 101–103 Inter Bratislava (15 October 2024)
- Winning streak: 8 games Inter Bratislava
- Losing streak: 7 games Keila Coolbet

2024–25 European North Basketball League was the fourth season of the European North Basketball League, a regional basketball competition patronized by FIBA. It was won by CSO Voluntari, after defeating Newcastle Eagles in the final 95–82.

== Teams ==
Record-breaking 18 teams participated in 2024–25 season. For the first time in leagues history, previous season champions Bakken Bears returned to defend their championship.

This season marked the debut of the teams from Germany, Norway and Slovakia.

Location of teams in 2024–25 European North Basketball League
- 1st, 2nd, 3rd etc. – positions in national championships.
- TH - Title holder

Regular season
(Denmark) Bakken Bears (1st)^{TH}	(United Kingdom) Newcastle Eagles (4th)	(Romania) Dinamo București (7th)	(Germany) Bamberg Baskets (11th)
(Czech Republic) Opava (5th)	(United Kingdom) Bristol Flyers (7th)	(Slovakia) Spišski Rytieri (2nd)	(Latvia) Valmiera Glass ViA (6th)
(Czech Republic) Brno (6th)	(Poland) Legia Warszawa (5th)	(Slovakia) Inter Bratislava (7th)	(Netherlands) Donar (3rd/4th)
(Estonia) Tartu Ülikool Maks & Moorits (2nd)	(Poland) Dziki Warsaw (10th)	(Bulgaria) Spartak Pleven (4th)	(Norway) Fyllingen Lions (1st)
(Estonia) Keila Coolbet	(Romania) CSO Voluntari (3rd)		

== Format ==
18 teams were divided into two groups of nine teams each for the regular season. The draw for the regular season groups took place on July 24.

Clubs are guaranteed eight games in the main tournament – four at home and four away. The top four teams from each group will qualify for the playoffs (A1-B4, A2-B3, A3-B2, A4-B1). The winners of the quarterfinals will be determined by the sum of two games, with the second game being played at the home court of the higher-seeded team. The Final Four will take place in April 2025.

== Regular season ==
=== Group A ===
Pos	Team	Pld	W	L	PF	PA	PD	Pts	Qualification	EAG	VOL	DZI	VAL	OPA	TAR	DON	SPA	SPI
1	(United Kingdom) Newcastle Eagles	8	7	1	643	572	+71	15	Advance to Playoffs	—	84–80	—	—	84–69	—	67–63	75–61	—
2	(Romania) CSO Voluntari	8	6	2	778	625	+153	14	Advance to Playoffs	—	—	103–83	83–84	—	113–64	—	—	104–80
3	(Poland) Dziki Warsaw	8	6	2	695	614	+81	14	Advance to Playoffs	70–79	—	—	85–73	—	—	95–79	—	102–70
4	(Latvia) Valmiera Glass ViA	8	6	2	719	668	+51	14	Advance to Playoffs	87–84	—	—	—	96–97	—	81–78	—	93–69
5	(Czech Republic) BK Opava	8	5	3	650	674	−24	13		—	67–88	68–83	—	—	—	88–86	83–68	—
6	(Estonia) Tartu Ülikool Maks & Moorits	8	2	6	611	694	−83	10		58–79	—	65–79	83–101	80–86	—	—	—	—
7	(Netherlands) Donar	8	2	6	634	661	−27	10		—	83–89	—	—	—	70–89	—	87–84	88–68
8	(Bulgaria) Spartak Pleven	8	1	7	633	738	−105	9		—	80–118	77–98	89–104	—	75–85	—	—	—
9	(Slovakia) Spišskí Rytieri	8	1	7	639	756	−117	9		84–91	—	—	—	89–92	91–87	—	88–99	—

Source: enbleague.eu

=== Group B ===
Pos	Team	Pld	W	L	PF	PA	PD	Pts	Qualification	INT	BAM	LEG	BAK	BRI	BRN	DIN	KEI	FYL
1	(Slovakia) Inter Bratislava	8	8	0	731	690	+41	16	Advance to Playoffs	—	88–83	89–83	—	—	—	—	94–79	90–88
2	(Germany) Bamberg Baskets	8	7	1	677	577	+100	15	Advance to Playoffs	—	—	—	87–81	—	90–70	93–78	84–58	—
3	(Poland) Legia Warsaw	8	6	2	687	637	+50	14	Advance to Playoffs	—	73–87	—	88–79	—	—	—	80–72	102–72
4	(Denmark) Bakken Bears	8	4	4	665	609	+56	12	Advance to Playoffs	81–87	—	—	—	83–72	89–92	83–65	—	—
5	(United Kingdom) Bristol Flyers	8	4	4	637	632	+5	12		80–84	69–79	79–86	—	—	—	76–58	—	—
6	(Czech Republic) Brno	8	3	5	664	690	−26	11		101–103	—	71–84	—	89–93	—	—	—	68–72
7	(Romania) Dinamo București	8	2	6	649	693	−44	10		95–96	—	88–91	—	—	68–79	—	—	105–89
8	(Estonia) Keila Coolbet	8	1	7	602	681	−79	9		—	—	—	48–82	77–82	91–94	86–92	—	—
9	(Norway) Fyllingen Lions	8	1	7	600	703	−103	9		—	60–74	—	70–87	76–86	—	—	73–91	—

Source: enbleague.eu

== Playoffs ==
Each tie in the quarter-finals phase were played over two legs. The winning teams qualified for the Final Four tournament.

=== Quarterfinals ===
Team 1	Agg.	Team 2	1st leg	2nd leg
Newcastle Eagles (United Kingdom)	177–160	(Denmark) Bakken Bears	84–87	93–73
CSO Voluntari (Romania)	197–168	(Poland) Legia Warsaw	95–81	102–87
Bamberg Baskets (Germany)	165–167	(Poland) Dziki Warsaw	74–95	91–72
Inter Bratislava (Slovakia)	190–162	(Latvia) Valmiera Glass ViA	105–83	85–79

=== Final Four ===
The 2025 Final Four took place in Gopass Arena, Bratislava on April 8–9.

Semifinals
8 April
(Slovakia) Inter Bratislava	103
(Romania) CSO Voluntari	107
8 April
(United Kingdom) Newcastle Eagles	80
(Poland) Dziki Warsaw	67

Championship game
9 April
(Romania) CSO Voluntari	95
(United Kingdom) Newcastle Eagles	82
Third place game
9 April
(Slovakia) Inter Bratislava	78
(Poland) Dziki Warsaw	80

==== Semifinals ====
Team 1	Score	Team 2
Inter Bratislava (Slovak Basketball Association)	103–107	(Romanian Basketball Federation) CSO Voluntari
Newcastle Eagles (British Basketball)	80–67	(Polish Basketball Federation) Dziki Warsaw

==== Third place game ====
Team 1	Score	Team 2
Inter Bratislava (Slovak Basketball Association)	78–80	(Polish Basketball Federation) Dziki Warsaw

==== Final ====
Team 1	Score	Team 2
CSO Voluntari (Romanian Basketball Federation)	95–82	(British Basketball) Newcastle Eagles

== Awards ==
All official awards of the 2024–25 European North Basketball League.

=== Season awards ===
Award	Player	Team	Ref.
Regular season MVP	(United States) Isaiah Cousins	(Slovakia) Inter Bratislava	
Defensive Player of the Year	(United States) Dontay Caruthers	(Slovakia) Inter Bratislava	
