= 2025–26 European North Basketball League =

Fifth season of the European North Basketball League

European North Basketball League
- Season: 2025–26
- Duration: 23 September 2025 – 23 April 2026
- Teams: 26

Regular season
- Season MVP: (United States) Spencer Reaves

Finals
- Champions: (Poland) Dziki Warsaw (1st title)
- Runners-up: (United Kingdom) Manchester Basketball
- Third place: (Germany) Syntainics MBC
- Fourth place: (Romania) CSO Voluntari
- Finals MVP: (United States) Landrius Horton

Records
- Biggest home win: Newcastle Eagles 128–68 BK Olomoucko (6 February 2026)
- Biggest away win: BK Olomoucko 55–101 Dziki Warsaw (28 October 2025)
- Highest scoring: Tindastóll 104–110 Dinamo Zagreb (20 January 2026)
- Winning streak: 7 games Syntainics MBC
- Losing streak: 7 games Keila Coolbet

The 2025–26 European North Basketball League was the fifth season of the European North Basketball League, a regional basketball competition patronised by FIBA.

== Teams ==
In the 2025–26 season, 26 teams participated.

Due to the high interest of Croatian clubs in the ENBL and only three spots available for Croatian teams, the Croatian Basketball Federation decided to play a tournament deciding which clubs were allowed to participate in the ENBL. Participating teams are:

- Kvarner 2010
- Dubrava
- GKK Šibenka
- Dinamo Zagreb
- Zabok
- Alkar Sinj

The two best ranked teams from this tournament will participate in the ENBL. If Dubrava is not among the top two, it will still participate in this competition, as it is the first club to independently negotiate entry into the Northern League. Thus either two or three Croatian teams will participate in the ENBL.

On September 19, two finalists of "Liburnia cup" were Dinamo Zagreb and Alkar, thus qualified for the ENBL.

Location of teams in 2025–26 European North Basketball League
- 1st, 2nd, 3rd etc. – positions in national championships
- TH - Title holder
- QT: Qualifying tournament winner

Regular season
(United Kingdom) Newcastle Eagles (5th)	(Croatia) Dubrava (9th)	(Czech Republic) Olomoucko (3rd)	(Latvia) Rigas Zelli (3rd)
(United Kingdom) Manchester (4th)	(Croatia) Dinamo Zagreb (6th)^{QT}	(Czech Republic) Opava (6th)	(Latvia) Valmiera Glass ViA (4th)
(United Kingdom) Bristol Flyers (7th)	(Croatia) Alkar Sinj (7th)^{QT}	(Estonia) TalTech (4th)	(Poland) Dziki Warsaw (10th)
(Norway) Fyllingen Lions (1st)	(Kosovo) KB Prishtina (3rd)	(Estonia) Keila Coolbet (6th)	(Bulgaria) Spartak Pleven (4th)
(Norway) Gimle Basket (3rd)	(Kosovo) KB Peja (5th)	(Belgium) Brussels (5th)	(Austria) Hefte Helfen Bulls (8th)
(Romania) CSO Voluntari (4th)^{TH}	(Netherlands) Donar (4th)	(Slovakia) Slovan Bratislava (2nd)	(Greece) Iraklis (2nd)^{2nd}
(Iceland) Tindastóll (2nd)	(Germany) Mitteldeutscher BC (8th)		

== Format ==
The exact setup and the group distribution of the 2025–26 format was discussed during the Technical Meeting of the league in Riga in the weekend of 16 and 17 August, to which each team sent a representative.

The format entails three groups of 9 teams, bringing the total of 27 teams. Teams will all play in the regular season, in which they will play four home games and four away games. The groups were determined based on the following criteria:

1. Team positions in the ENBL 2024–2025 season
2. Geographic limitations – no more than one team from each country in group, if possible
3. Subjective opinion to make groups as equal as possible

Out of these matches, an overall ranking will be made. Out of this ranking, the best 16 will progress to the Round of 16. There, one match will determine which team progresses to the quarterfinals. The quarterfinals will consist of two matches, a home and an away match, and determine who progresses to the final four.

On 17 October it was announced that the season will only entail 26 teams from 17 countries. The 27th team from the 18th country could not proceed to participate in the League. A replacement could not be found and therefore the decision was made to progress with only 26 teams. This meant that in group 3, some teams meet each other twice to guarantee the 4 home and 4 away games.

== Regular season ==
=== Standings ===
Pos	Team	Pld	W	L	PF	PA	PD	Pts	Qualification or relegation
1	(Germany) Mitteldeutscher BC	8	7	1	729	598	+131	15	Round of 16
2	(Greece) Iraklis	8	7	1	728	598	+130	15	Round of 16
3	(Romania) CSO Voluntari	8	7	1	734	644	+90	15	Round of 16
4	(Croatia) Dinamo Zagreb	8	6	2	731	708	+23	14	Round of 16
5	(United Kingdom) Manchester Basketball	8	6	2	733	662	+71	14	Round of 16
6	(Iceland) Tindastóll	8	6	2	785	715	+70	14	Round of 16
7	(Poland) Dziki Warsaw	8	5	3	716	622	+94	13	Round of 16
8	(Netherlands) Donar	8	5	3	713	667	+46	13	Round of 16
9	(Czech Republic) BK Opava	8	5	3	705	677	+28	13	Round of 16
10	(Latvia) Valmiera Glass ViA	8	5	3	721	718	+3	13	Round of 16
11	(Latvia) Rigas Zelli	8	5	3	664	661	+3	13	Round of 16
12	(Croatia) KK Dubrava	8	4	4	649	632	+17	12	Round of 16
13	(Kosovo) Sigal Prishtina	8	4	4	602	587	+15	12	Round of 16
14	(Slovakia) Slovan Bratislava	8	4	4	662	655	+7	12	Round of 16
15	(Estonia) TalTech	8	4	4	617	616	+1	12	Round of 16
16	(Czech Republic) BK Olomoucko	8	4	4	498	583	−85	12	Round of 16
17	(Belgium) Brussels Basketball	8	3	5	638	622	+16	11	
18	(United Kingdom) Newcastle Eagles	8	3	5	628	620	+8	11	
19	(United Kingdom) Bristol Flyers	8	3	5	659	674	−15	11	
20	(Bulgaria) Spartak Pleven	8	3	5	655	687	−32	11	
21	(Croatia) Alkar	8	3	5	581	648	−67	11	
22	(Austria) Hefte Helfen Bulls	8	1	7	645	700	−55	9	
23	(Estonia) Keila Coolbet	8	1	7	541	648	−107	9	
24	(Norway) Gimle Basket	8	1	7	611	734	−123	9	
25	(Norway) Fyllingen Lions	8	1	7	611	745	−134	9	
26	(Kosovo) KB Peja (Note: KB Peja was disqualified from the tournament due to repeated no-shows.)	8	1	7	412	547	−135	6 (Note: Due to their failure to show up in the away match against BK Olomoucko, KB Peja has been awarded a forfeit and 0 points in the standings. After the refusal of their home match against BK Olomoucko all further matches were cancelled and no further points awarded to KB Peja. Previously earned points were however not stricken, thus resulting in 6 points for the team.)	Disqualified

Rules for classification: 1) points. 2) Points difference.

=== Group 1 ===
Home \ Away	SIN	FLY	VOL	DON	FYL	BUL	MBC	TAL	VAL
(Croatia) Alkar Sinj	—	76–81	—	—	—	81–65	52–69	—	104–94
(United Kingdom) Bristol Flyers	—	—	—	69–70	82–91	—	76–93	70–76	—
(Romania) CSO Voluntari	92–72	99–85	—	97–91	—	—	87–83	—	—
(Netherlands) Donar	90–71	—	—	—	88–80	—	—	93–71	88–92
(Norway) Fyllingen Lions	72–74	—	64–104	—	—	—	64–107	71–89	—
(Austria) Hefte Helfen Bulls	—	78–90	80–85	81–89	108–94	—	—	—	—
(Germany) Syntainics MBC	—	—	—	106–104	—	98–89	—	84–57	89–69
(Estonia) TalTech	85–51	—	88–93	—	—	61–55	—	—	90–99
(Latvia) Valmiera Glass ViA	—	91–106	81–77	—	93–75	102–89	—	—	—

Source: enbleague.eu
Legend: Blue = home team win; Red = away team win.
Matches with lighter background shading were decided after overtime.

=== Group 2 ===
Home \ Away	OPA	BRU	DIN	GIM	KEI	MCB	PRI	SLB	TIN
(Czech Republic) BK Opava	—	69–60	94–69	103–85	—	—	—	—	95–68
(Belgium) Brussels Basketball	—	—	92–95	—	95–70	66–79	75–80	—	—
(Croatia) Dinamo Zagreb	—	—	—	81–69	98–73	88–91	—	108–105	—
(Norway) Gimle Basket	—	65–86	—	—	76–75	72–94	—	77–80	—
(Estonia) Keila Coolbet	84–94	—	—	—	—	—	92–90	79–95	—
(United Kingdom) Manchester Basketball	112–92	—	—	—	84–80	—	99–74	78–90	—
(Kosovo) Sigal Prishtina	102–75	—	80–82	90–79	—	—	—	—	98–104
(Slovakia) Slovan Bratislava	97–83	66–72	—	—	—	—	73–78	—	56–80
(Iceland) Tindastóll	—	98–92	104–110	125–88	—	100–96	—	—	—

Source: enbleague.eu
Legend: Blue = home team win; Red = away team win.
Matches with lighter background shading were decided after overtime.

=== Group 3 ===
Home \ Away	OLO	DZI	IRA	PEJ	DUB	EAG	RIG	SPA
(Czech Republic) BK Olomoucko	—	55–101	82–109	20–0	82–73	—	—	—
(Poland) Dziki Warsaw	—	—	—	103–81	72–67	—	91–93	94–77
(Greece) Iraklis	—	87–75	—	122–80	—	85–71	—	72–69
(Kosovo) KB Peja	0–20	—	—	—	—	0–20	72–83	96–81
(Croatia) KK Dubrava	—	94–89	72–67	98–83	—	—	86–74	—
(United Kingdom) Newcastle Eagles	128–68	68–91	80–108	—	82–77	—	—	—
(Latvia) Rigas Zelli	81–87	—	69–78	—	—	96–88	—	83–78
(Bulgaria) Spartak Pleven	91–84	—	—	—	83–82	95–91	81–85	—

Source: enbleague.eu
Legend: Blue = home team win; Red = away team win.
Matches with lighter background shading were decided after overtime.

== Play-offs ==
Sixteen teams advanced to the 2026 ENBL playoffs. Round of 16 was featured a single elimination game at a higher seed between 4–12 March 2026. Quarterfinals offered “best-of-two” home and away series between 17 March–9 April 2026. The winners advanced to the Final Four.

Round of 16; 4–12 March 2026
1	(Germany) Syntainics MBC	98
16	(Czech Republic) BK Olomoucko	83
8	(Netherlands) Donar	103
9	(Czech Republic) BK Opava	86
4	(Croatia) Dinamo Zagreb	20
~~13~~	~~(Kosovo) Sigal Prishtina~~	0
5	(United Kingdom) Manchester Basketball	94
12	(Croatia) KK Dubrava	92
2	(Greece) Iraklis	76
15	(Estonia) TalTech	63
7	(Poland) Dziki Warsaw	97
10	(Latvia) Valmiera Glass ViA	84
3	(Romania) CSO Voluntari	99
14	(Slovakia) Slovan Bratislava	74
6	(Iceland) Tindastóll	94
11	(Latvia) Rigas Zelli	101

Quarterfinals; 17 March–9 April 2026
1	(Germany) Syntainics MBC	100	80	180
8	(Netherlands) Donar	81	73	154
4	(Croatia) Dinamo Zagreb	84	94	178
5	(United Kingdom) Manchester Basketball	86	97	183
2	(Greece) Iraklis	82	83	165
7	(Poland) Dziki Warsaw	89	84	173
3	(Romania) CSO Voluntari	81	96	177
11	(Latvia) Rigas Zelli	80	91	171

Semifinals; 21 April 2026
1	(Germany) Syntainics MBC	86
5	(United Kingdom) Manchester Basketball	89
3	(Romania) CSO Voluntari	80
7	(Poland) Dziki Warsaw	87

Final; 23 April 2026
5	(United Kingdom) Manchester Basketball	97
7	(Poland) Dziki Warsaw	109
Third place
1	(Germany) Syntainics MBC	92
3	(Romania) CSO Voluntari	76

=== Round of 16 ===
The Round of 16 took place on 4–12 March 2026.

Home team	Score	Away team
Syntainics MBC (German Basketball Federation)	98–83	(Czech Basketball Federation) BK Olomoucko
Iraklis (Hellenic Basketball Federation)	76–63	(Estonian Basketball Association) TalTech
CSO Voluntari (Romanian Basketball Federation)	99–74	(Slovak Basketball Association) Slovan Bratislava
Dinamo Zagreb (Croatian Basketball Federation)	–	(Basketball Federation of Kosovo) ~~Sigal Prishtina~~
Manchester Basketball (British Basketball)	94–92	(Croatian Basketball Federation) KK Dubrava
Tindastóll (Icelandic Basketball Association)	94–101	(Latvian Basketball Association) Rigas Zelli
Dziki Warsaw (Polish Basketball Federation)	97–84	(Latvian Basketball Association) Valmiera Glass ViA
Donar (Basketball Nederland)	103–86	(Czech Basketball Federation) BK Opava

=== Quarterfinals ===
Team 1	Agg.	Team 2	1st leg	2nd leg
Syntainics MBC (German Basketball Federation)	180–154	(Basketball Nederland) Donar	100–81	80–73
Dinamo Zagreb (Croatian Basketball Federation)	178–183	(British Basketball) Manchester Basketball	84–86	94–97
Iraklis (Hellenic Basketball Federation)	165–173	(Polish Basketball Federation) Dziki Warsaw	82–89	83–84
CSO Voluntari (Romanian Basketball Federation)	177–171	(Latvian Basketball Association) Rigas Zelli	81–80	96–91

=== Final Four ===
The 2026 Final Four took place on April 22–23, 2026. It was hosted by Syntainics MBC in their Stadthalle Weißenfels, despite some critism from the German Basketball Federation. The federation was of the opinion that the league has no legitimacy nor relevance. This stance stems from the ongoing power struggle between the FIBA and sprouting overgrowth of European competition in which the Federation firmly positions themselves with the FIBA.

==== Semifinals ====
Team 1	Score	Team 2
Syntainics MBC (German Basketball Federation)	86–89	(British Basketball) Manchester Basketball
CSO Voluntari (Romanian Basketball Federation)	80–87	(Polish Basketball Federation) Dziki Warsaw

==== Third place game ====
Team 1	Score	Team 2
Syntainics MBC (German Basketball Federation)	92–76	(Romanian Basketball Federation) CSO Voluntari

==== Final ====
Team 1	Score	Team 2
Manchester Basketball (British Basketball)	97–109	(Polish Basketball Federation) Dziki Warsaw

== Awards ==
All official awards of the 2025–26 European North Basketball League.

=== Player of the month ===
Month	Player	Team	Ref.
January/February	(United States) Chris Smith	(Greece) Iraklis	

=== Season awards ===
Award	Winner	Team	Ref.
Regular season MVP	(United States) Spencer Reaves	(Germany) Mitteldeutscher BC	
Final Four MVP	(United States) Landrius Horton	(Poland) Dziki Warsaw	
Defensive Player of the regular season	(Greece) Dimitrios Moraitis	(Greece) Iraklis	
Coach of the season	(Netherlands) Jason Dourisseau	(Netherlands) Donar	
