= Haarlem Basketball Week =

- Sport: Basketball
- Founded: 1982
- Folded: 2008
- Most titles: (United States) Levi's WBL All-Stars (United States) Marathon Oil Chicago (Netherlands) EclipseJet-MyGuide Amsterdam (2 titles each)

The Haarlem Basketball Week was a friendly basketball tournament held in Haarlem, Netherlands from 1982 till 2008. Several notable players have participated, including Sarunas Marciulionis, Drazen Petrovic, Vince Carter and Vlade Divac.

== Editions ==
| Edition | Season | Champion |
|---|---|---|
| 1 | 1982–83 | (Italy) Berloni Torino |
| 2 | 1983–84 | (Netherlands) Elmex Leiden |
| 3 | 1984–85 | (United States) Marathon Oil Chicago |
| 4 | 1985–86 | (Socialist Federal Republic of Yugoslavia) Yugoslavia |
| 5 | 1986–87 | (United States) Marathon Oil Chicago (2) |
| 6 | 1987–88 | Canada |
| 7 | 1988–89 | (Soviet Union) BC Žalgiris Kaunas |
| 8 | 1989–90 | (United States) Levi’s WBL All Stars |
| 9 | 1990–91 | (United States) Levi’s WBL All Stars (2) |
| 10 | 1991–92 | Australia |
| 11 | 1992–93 | (Israel) Hapoel Eilat B.C. |
| 12 | 1993–94 | (France) Olympique Antibes |
| 13 | 1994 | (Brazil) São Paulo BC |
| 14 | 1995 | (Estonia) Tallinn Kalev |
| 15 | 1996–97 | (Israel) Maccabi Tel Aviv B.C. |
| 16 | 1997–98 | Brazil |
| 17 | 1998–99 | (Serbia and Montenegro) KK Partizan |
| 18 | 1999–00 | (France) ASVEL Basket |
| 19 | 2000–01 | (Belgium) Athlon Ieper |
| 20 | 2002–03 | (Netherlands) Ricoh Astronauts |
| 21 | 2006–07 | (Netherlands) EiffelTowers Den Bosch |
| 22 | 2007–08 | (Netherlands) EclipseJet-MyGuide Amsterdam (2) |

== See also ==
- Haarlem Baseball Week
