= Mitteldeutscher BC =

Professional basketball team in Weißenfels, Germany

SYNTAINICS MBC
- Nickname: MBC
- Leagues: BBL; ENBL; DBBL
- Founded: 1958; 68 years ago
- History: SSV Einheit Weißenfels; 1958–1999; Mitteldeutscher BC; 1999–present
- Arena: Stadthalle Weißenfels
- Capacity: 3,000
- Location: Weißenfels, Germany
- Team colors: Blue, orange
- President: Jörg Hexel
- Team manager: Martin Geissler
- Head coach: Vladimir Jovanović (men); Timur Topal (women)
- Championships: 1 FIBA EuroCup Challenge; 1 German Cup; 3 ProA
- Website: syntainics-mbc.de
| Home | Away | Third |

Mitteldeutscher Basketball Club (English: Central German Basketball Club), for sponsorship reasons named SYNTAINICS MBC for the men, and halfit Lions for the women, and commonly known as simply MBC, is a professional basketball club based in Weißenfels, Germany. The club currently plays in the Basketball Bundesliga, the first tier league in Germany.

MBC has won the BBL-Pokal in 2025, its first national trophy, as well as the FIBA EuroCup Challenge in 2004.

== History ==
MBC logo used until 2019

The club was founded as SSV Einheit Weißenfels in 1958 and has played in the Basketball Bundesliga since the 1999–2000 season. In 2003-04, Mitteldeutscher won the FIBA EuroCup Challenge, defeating JDA Dijon Basket in the Final. Later that season, however, the team filed for bankruptcy and the league relegated the team to the Regionalliga (third division).

MBC won promotion to the second division after the 2004–05 season and earned promotion back to the Basketball Bundesliga after the 2008–09 season. In 2010 and 2016 the team relegated again, but promoted back the next season both times.

In the 2024–25 season, MBC won its first national trophy when they captured the BBL-Pokal, after defeating favored Bayern Munich and Bamberg in the final four, which was hosted in Weißenfels. Michael Devoe scored 27 points in the final and was named the tournament MVP. MBC became the first team from the new states of Germany to win the Cup title.

== Honours ==
- ProA (German 2nd Division):

Champions: 2008–09, 2011–12, 2016–17

- FIBA Europe Cup / FIBA EuroCup Challenge:

Champions: 2003–04

- BBL-Pokal:

Champions: 2024–25

== Team ==
=== Current roster ===
Mitteldeutscher BC roster
Players
Coaches

| Pos. | No. | Nat. | Name | Ht. |
|---|---|---|---|---|---|
| F/C | 1 | (Germany) (Brazil) | de Oliveira, Gabriel | 2.06 m (6 ft 9 in) | 28 – 3 March 1998 |
| G | 3 | (United States) | Hunt, DeLonnie | 1.83 m (6 ft 0 in) | 25 – 26 October 2001 |
| G | 4 | (Serbia) | Radojicić, Vuk | 1.85 m (6 ft 1 in) | 25 – 19 June 2001 |
| G | 8 | (Germany) | Wafa, Abdul | 1.85 m (6 ft 1 in) | 18 – 1 April 2008 |
| C | 9 | (Croatia) (Germany) | Nikić, Krešimir | 2.13 m (7 ft 0 in) | 27 – 16 April 1999 |
| SG | 10 | (Germany) | Mushidi, Kostja | 1.95 m (6 ft 5 in) | 28 – 18 June 1998 |
| SG | 11 | (United States) | Gaines, Anthony | 1.93 m (6 ft 4 in) | 28 – 30 May 1998 |
| F/C | 22 | (Serbia) | Simanić, Boriša | 2.11 m (6 ft 11 in) | 28 – 20 March 1998 |
| SG | 31 | (United States) (Germany) | Reaves, Spencer | 1.91 m (6 ft 3 in) | 30 – 23 December 1995 |
| PF | 40 | (United States) (Germany) | Welp, Collin | 2.05 m (6 ft 9 in) | 27 – 15 December 1998 |
| SF | 42 | (Germany) | Siegert, Mika | 2.01 m (6 ft 7 in) | 18 – 9 March 2008 |
| C | 44 | (Croatia) | Planinić, Jure | 2.06 m (6 ft 9 in) | 26 – 18 March 2000 |

Head coach

- (Serbia) Vladimir Jovanović

Assistant coach(es)

- (Germany) Christopher Schreiber

Legend

- (C) Team captain
- Injured

- Roster
Updated: October 29, 2026

=== Individual awards ===
ProA MVP

- Wayne Bernard: 2008
- Arizona Reid: 2012

=== Notable players ===
Note: Flags indicate national team eligibility at FIBA-sanctioned events. Players may hold other non-FIBA nationalities not displayed.

Criteria

To appear in this section a player must have either:

- Set a club record or won an individual award while at the club
- Played at least one official international match for their national team at any time
- Played at least one official NBA match at any time.

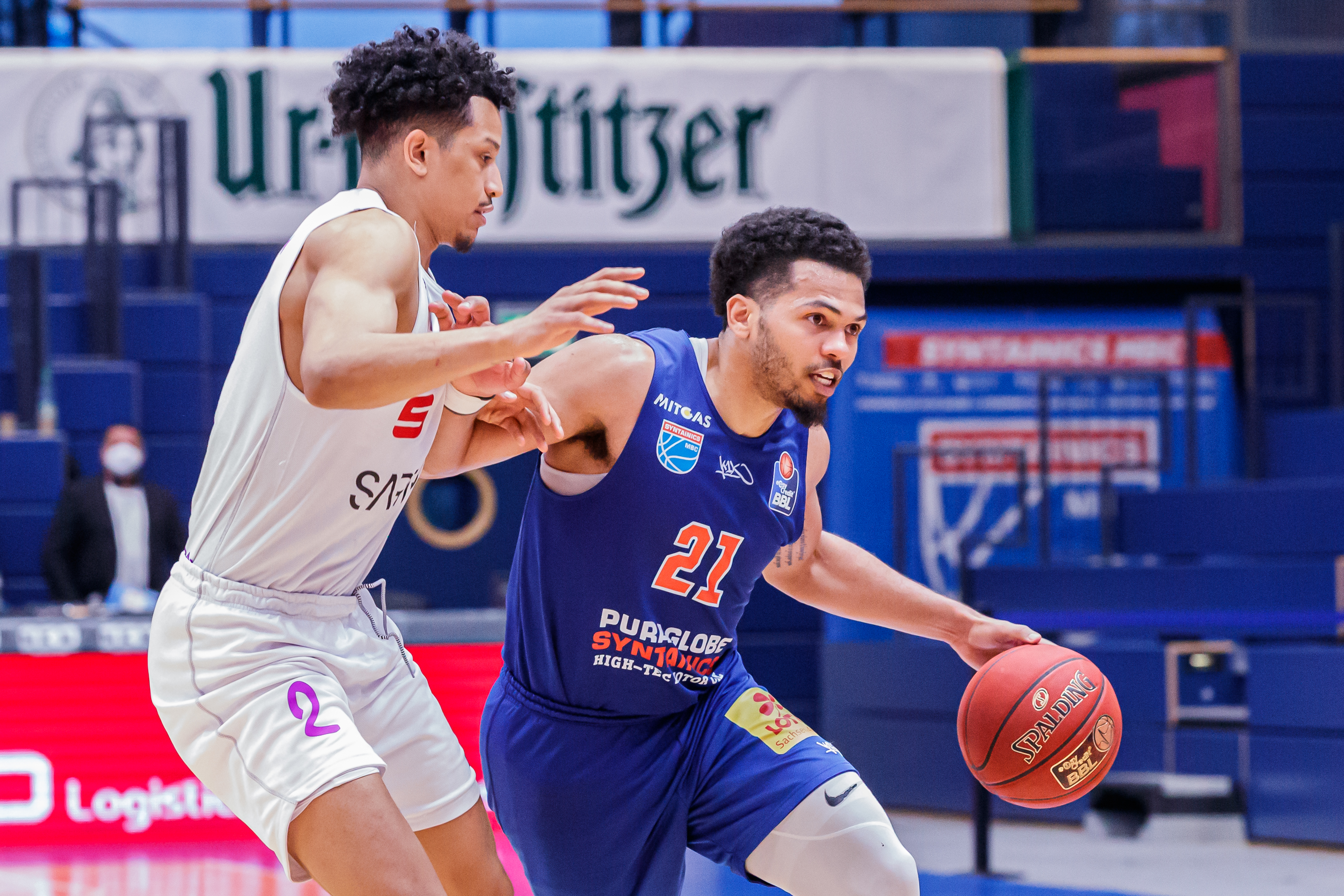
Quinton Hooker

- (Germany) Mithat Demirel
- (Germany) Misan Nikagbatse
- (Germany) Akeem Vargas
- (Bulgaria) Vassil Evtimov
- (Canada) Kaza Kajami-Keane
- (Canada) Adika Peter-McNeilly
- (Ivory Coast) Bazoumana Koné
- (Croatia) Filip Bundović
- (Denmark) Kevin Larsen
- (Finland) Antti Nikkilä
- (Finland) Perttu Blomgren
- (Georgia (country)) Manuchar Markoishvili
- (Georgia (country)) Giorgi Gamqrelidze
- (Iran) Behnam Yakhchali
- (Iceland) Hörður Axel Vilhjálmsson
- (Lithuania) Martynas Andriuškevičius
- (Lithuania) Marijonas Petravičius
- (Lithuania) Mindaugas Timinskas
- (Latvia) Mārtiņš Meiers
- (Nigeria) Ade Dagunduro
- (Nigeria) Michael Gbinije
- (Philippines) Christian Standhardinger
- (Poland) Jakub Garbacz
- (Romania) Patrick Richard
- (Serbia) Stefan Birčević
- (Serbia) Jovan Novak
- (Serbia) Nikola Rebić
- (Thailand) Martin Breunig
- (United States) Wendell Alexis
- (United States) Cat Barber
- (United States) Michael Devoe
- (United States) Vince Edwards
- (United States) Jordan Sibert
- (United States) Khyri Thomas

== Season by season ==
| Season | Tier | League | Pos. | W–L | German Cup | European competitions | | |
|---|---|---|---|---|---|---|---|---|
| 1997–98 | 2 | 2. BBL | 6th | | | | | |
| 1998–99 | 2 | 2. BBL | 2nd | | | | | |
| 1999–00 | 1 | Bundesliga | 6th | | | | | |
| 2000–01 | 1 | Bundesliga | 7th | | | 3 Korać Cup | ER2 | 1–1 |
| 2001–02 | 1 | Bundesliga | 13th | | | North European Basketball League | Regular season | |
| 2002–03 | 1 | Bundesliga | 11th | | | | | |
| 2003–04 | 1 | Bundesliga | 12th (Note: Relegated due to its financial trouble.) | | | 4 FIBA Europe Cup | C | 10–0 |
| 2004–05 | 3 | Oberliga | 1st | | | | | |
| 2005–06 | 2 | 2. BBL | 2nd | | | | | |
| 2006–07 | 2 | 2. BBL | 2nd | | | | | |
| 2007–08 | 2 | ProA | 5th | | | | | |
| 2008–09 | 2 | ProA | 1st | | | | | |
| 2009–10 | 1 | Bundesliga | 10th | 18–16 | | | | |
| 2010–11 | 1 | Bundesliga | 17th | 8–26 | | | | |
| 2011–12 | 2 | ProA | 1st | | | | | |
| 2012–13 | 1 | Bundesliga | 16th | 13–21 | | | | |
| 2013–14 | 1 | Bundesliga | 9th | 16–18 | | | | |
| 2014–15 | 1 | Bundesliga | 12th | 14–20 | | | | |
| 2015–16 | 1 | Bundesliga | 17th | 9–25 | | | | |
| 2016–17 | 2 | ProA | 1st | 35–3 | | | | |
| 2017–18 | 1 | Bundesliga | 15th | 10–24 | | | | |
| 2018–19 | 1 | Bundesliga | 15th | 10–24 | | | | |
| 2019–20 | 1 | Bundesliga | 16th | 3–17 | Quarterfinals | | | |
| 2020–21 | 1 | Bundesliga | 15th | 9–25 | Group stage | | | |
| 2021–22 | 1 | Bundesliga | 16th | 11–23 | Round of 16 | | | |
| 2022–23 | 1 | Bundesliga | 16th | 11–23 | Round of 16 | | | |
| 2023–24 | 1 | Bundesliga | 13th | 11–23 | Quarterfinals | | | |
| 2024–25 | 1 | Bundesliga | 8th | 17–15 | Champions | | | |
| 2025–26 | 1 | Bundesliga | 13th | 13–21 | Round of 16 | R Europeaon North Basketball League | 3rd | 11–2 |
| 2026–27 | 1 | Bundesliga | | | Round of 16 | R Europeaon North Basketball League | RS | 0-0 |
