= 2026–27 European North Basketball League =

Sixth season of the European North Basketball League

European North Basketball League
- Season: 2026–27
- Duration: 23 September 2026 – April 2027
- Games played: 84
- Teams: 18

Records
- Biggest home win: Hefte Helfen Bulls 108–83 BK Liepāja (21 October 2026)
- Biggest away win: Fyllingen Lions 54–79 Spartak Pleven (30 September 2026)
- Highest scoring: Hefte Helfen Bulls 108–83 BK Liepāja (21 October 2026)
- Winning streak: 3 games Mitteldeutscher BC; Tindastóll
- Losing streak: 4 games Pully Lausanne Foxes

The 2026–27 European North Basketball League will be the sixth season of the European North Basketball League, a regional basketball competition patronised by FIBA.

== Teams ==
18 teams will participate in the ENBL season 26–27.

Juventus Utena from Lithuania was amongst the first clubs to be announced to participate in the sixth season of the ENBL. At the moment of publication, the club was however still participating in the play-offs. The club had some unexpected successes and achieved a second place in the play-offs, meaning a ticket for the FIBA Champions League. The club therefore withdrew from the ENBL and joined the Champions League instead.

TRIA EKA AEL is the first club participating from Cyprus. The club announced that they signed an agreement to allow them participation for the coming three year.

Similar to the last season, too many clubs from Croatia were willing to participate to the ENBL. Since the league only had two groups this year and in each group only 1 team per country were allowed, a qualifying tournament was held again to determine which 2 clubs were allowed to participate in the ENBL. Between 17. September and 20. September, the clubs held a qualifying tournament in a round robin format. The best 2 teams would qualify. Participating teams were:

- Dubrava
- Dinamo Zagreb
- Zabok
- Alkar Sinj

Dubrava and Alkar Sinj emerged victories from the qualifying tournament and therefore earned their spot for the sixth ENBL season.

Location of teams in 2026–27 European North Basketball League
Group A; Group B
- 1st, 2nd, 3rd etc. – positions in national championships
- TH - Title holder

Regular season
(United Kingdom) Bristol Flyers (6th)	(Germany) Mitteldeutscher BC (13th)	(Bulgaria) Spartak Pleven (6th)	(Netherlands) Donar (4th)
(Norway) Fyllingen Lions (1st)	(Lithuania) Jonava Hipocredit (8th)	(Romania) CSO Voluntari (6th)	(Estonia) TalTech (3rd)
(Poland) Anwil Włocławek (9th)	(Austria) Hefte Helfen Bulls (1st)	(Switzerland) Pully Lausanne Foxes (4th)	(Croatia) Dubrava (7th)
(Latvia) BK Liepāja (6th)	(Iceland) Tindastóll (2nd)	(Bosnia and Herzegovina) HKK Zrinjski 1992 (11th)	(Croatia) Alkar Sinj (9th)
(Cyprus) TRIA EKA AEL (3rd)	(Georgia (country)) BC CIU Tbilisi (8th)		

== Format ==
Like previous years, participation in the ENBL is not linked to domestic results. Clubs can participate by paying a membership and participation fee to the league. The league allows clubs the freedom to apply for the ENBL while simultaneously awaiting the result of the division of Champions League or Europe Cup tickets. This gives the clubs the opportunity to ensure European basketball, whether in the ENBL or the FIBA tournaments.

The league has limited participation to two clubs per country.

The league will be split into two groups of 9 teams, with each nationality only represented once in each group. Each team will play four home games and four away games and play against each opponent only once. After the group stage, the best four teams of each group will advance to the quarterfinals. In the quarterfinals, a home and away game will decide which team advances to the Final Four.

== Regular season ==
=== Group A ===
Pos	Team	Pld	W	L	PF	PA	PD	Pts	Qualification	MBC	TIN	BUL	PUL	BRI	LIE	CIU	DUB	JON
1	(Germany) Mitteldeutscher BC	5	5	0	495	396	+99	10	Advance to Playoffs	—	—	—	—	106–84	93–80	—	101–78	9 Dec
2	(Iceland) Tindastóll	5	5	0	408	348	+60	10	Advance to Playoffs	26 Jan	—	6 Dec	79–69	—	—	19 Jan	—	—
3	(Austria) Hefte Helfen Bulls	4	3	1	385	347	+38	7	Advance to Playoffs	87–107	—	—	—	—	108–83	96–86	16 Dec	—
4	(Switzerland) Pully Lausanne Foxes	6	1	5	456	524	−68	7	Advance to Playoffs	67–88	—	71–94	—	26 Jan	—	—	3 Mar	—
5	(United Kingdom) Bristol Flyers	4	2	2	318	329	−11	6		—	68–85	3 Dec	—	—	—	—	81–66	16 Dec
6	(Latvia) BK Liepāja	5	1	4	385	452	−67	6		—	69–92	—	81–74	72–85	—	9 Dec	—	—
7	(Georgia (country)) BC CIU Tbilisi	4	1	3	332	351	−19	5		12 Jan	—	—	97–88	3 Feb	—	—	—	67–80
8	(Croatia) Dubrava	4	1	3	302	337	−35	5		—	7 Dec	—	—	—	5 Jan	87–82	—	27 Jan
9	(Lithuania) Jonava Hipocredit	3	1	2	236	233	+3	4		—	71–77	20 Jan	85–87	—	13 Jan	—	—	—

Updated to match(es) played on 18 November 2026. Source: enbleague.eu
Legend: Blue = home team win; Red = away team win.
Matches with lighter background shading were decided after overtime.

=== Group B ===
Pos	Team	Pld	W	L	GF	GA	GD	Pts	Qualification	SPA	DON	AEL	ANW	VOL	TAL	FYL	ALK	ZRI
1	(Bulgaria) Spartak Pleven	5	4	1	386	361	+25	9	Advance to Playoffs	—	—	61–79	—	8 Dec	—	—	93–82	77–74
2	(Netherlands) Donar	5	3	2	416	412	+4	8	Advance to Playoffs	19 Jan	—	83–81	—	90–71	—	—	—	3 Feb
3	(Cyprus) TRIA EKA AEL	4	3	1	310	269	+41	7	Advance to Playoffs	—	—	—	12 Jan	—	74–67	76–58	—	3 Dec
4	(Poland) Anwil Włocławek	4	3	1	362	331	+31	7	Advance to Playoffs	15 Dec	97–81	—	—	86–87	—	14 Oct	—	—
5	(Romania) CSO Voluntari	4	3	1	344	343	+1	7		—	—	15 Dec	—	—	80–74	106–93	2 Feb	—
6	(Estonia) TalTech	5	2	3	391	394	−3	7		72–76	83–70	—	27 Jan	—	—	95–94	—	—
7	(Norway) Fyllingen Lions	5	1	4	374	427	−53	6		54–79	6 Jan	—	—	—	—	—	16 Dec	75–71
8	(Croatia) Alkar Sinj	4	1	3	339	367	−28	5		—	80–92	20 Jan	85–95	—	12 Jan	—	—	—
9	(Bosnia and Herzegovina) HKK Zrinjski 1992	4	0	4	310	328	−18	4		—	—	—	78–84	3 Feb	16 Dec	—	87–92	—

Updated to match(es) played on 18 November 2026. Source: enbleague.eu
Legend: Blue = home team win; Red = away team win.
Matches with lighter background shading were decided after overtime.

== Awards ==
All official awards of the 2026–27 European North Basketball League.

=== Player of the month ===
Month	Player	Team	Ref.
September/October	(United States) Jalan McCloud	(Bulgaria) Spartak Pleven	
