= KK Alkar =

Alkar
- Leagues: Croatian League
- Founded: 1955; 65 years ago
- History: KK Tekstilac (1955–1965); KK Alkar (1965–present)
- Arena: Ivica Glavan Ićo Sports Hall
- Capacity: 600
- Location: Sinj, Croatia
- Team colors: White and Blue
- President: Denis Katić
- Head coach: Damir Milačić
- Website: www.kkalkar.com

Košarkaški klub Alkar (English: Alkar Basketball Club), commonly referred to as KK Alkar or simply Alkar, is a men's professional basketball club based in Sinj, Croatia. The club competes in the Croatian League.

== History ==
The club was founded in 1955 under the name Tekstilac. In 1965, the club changed its name to Alkar.

== Notable players ==
- (Croatia) Stipe Modrić
- (Croatia) Josip Vranković

== Season by season ==
Season	Tier	Division	Pos.	Croatian Cup	European competitions		
2025–26	1	Premijer liga	9th	Eigthfinalist	R European North Basketball League	RS	3-5
