= Dziki Warsaw =

Polish basketball team

- Nickname: Dziki (The Boars)
- League: PLK; Europe Cup
- Founded: 2017; 9 years ago
- History: Dziki Warsaw; 2017–present
- Arena: Hala Koło
- Capacity: 1,280
- Location: Warsaw, Poland
- Team colors: Grey, Dark blue, White
- President: Michał Szolc
- Head coach: Marco Legovich
- Team captain: Grzegorz Grochowski
- Championships: 1 I Liga; 1 ENBL
- Website: www.dziki.basketball
Home	Away

Dziki Warszawa (in English: Dziki Warsaw) is a Polish men's basketball club, based in Warsaw. The team currently plays in the PLK, the Polish first division. The club was established in 2017 on the basis of another basketball club MKS Ochota Warsaw.

== History ==
Dziki were founded in 2017, on the basis of a III Liga team MKS MOS Ochota. In their first season in the II Liga, the team fought to stay in the league. A year later, they advanced to the playoff phase, and in 2020, they took first place in the competition and gained promotion to the Suzuka I Liga.

The goal for the 2022–23 season was promotion to the Polish Basketball League. The team was built based on top league experience and led by coach Krzysztof Szablowski. In the play-off final, they defeated Górnik Wałbrzych 3–0, earning themselves a spot in the Polish top division for the first time in their history.

== Roster ==
=== Current roster ===
Note: Flags indicate national team eligibility at FIBA-sanctioned events. Players may hold other non-FIBA nationalities not displayed.

Dziki Warsaw roster
Players
Coaches

Pos.	No.	Nat.	Name	Ht.	Wt.	Age
PG	1	(United States)	Luke, Austin	1.93 m (6 ft 4 in)	91 kg (201 lb)	32 – 27 October 1994
PG	2	(United States)	Ashton-Langford, Makai	1.91 m (6 ft 3 in)	84 kg (185 lb)	28 – 3 October 1998
SG	3	(United States)	Girard III, Joseph	1.85 m (6 ft 1 in)		25 – 27 November 2000
SG	5	(Poland)	Aleksandrowicz, Michał	1.92 m (6 ft 4 in)		37 – 10 May 1989
PF	8	(Poland)	Kempa, Krzysztof	2.00 m (6 ft 7 in)		21 – 17 December 2004
SF	11	(Poland)	Kamiński, Grzegorz	2.00 m (6 ft 7 in)		26 – 14 May 2000
SG	13	(United States)	Jackson, Quan	1.93 m (6 ft 4 in)		29 – 24 October 1997
SF	21	(Poland)	Krasuski, Michał	1.98 m (6 ft 6 in)		26 – 21 May 2000
F	22	(United Kingdom)	Adetukasi, Tim	1.98 m (6 ft 6 in)	109 kg (240 lb)	25 – 26 February 2001
C	23	(United States)	Osunniyi, Osun	2.08 m (6 ft 10 in)	100 kg (220 lb)	28 – 21 October 1998
F/C	24	(United States)	Waterman, Zane	2.06 m (6 ft 9 in)	100 kg (220 lb)	31 – 12 October 1995
C	45	(Poland)	Frąckiewicz, Łukasz	2.05 m (6 ft 9 in)		29 – 27 December 1996

Head coach

- (Italy) Marco Legovich

Assistant coach(es)

- (Italy) Federico Pesio
- (Poland) Wojciech Walich

Strength & conditioning coach(es)

- (Poland) Rafal Piesio

Legend

- (C) Team captain
- Injured

- Roster
Updated: August 31, 2026

== Honours ==
=== Domestic ===
- I Liga
  - Winners (1): 2023
- European North Basketball League
  - Winners (1): 2025–26

== Season by season ==
Season	Tier	League	Pos.	Record	Polish Cup	European competitions	
2017–18	3	II Liga	11th	8–16			
2018–19	3	II Liga	6th	15–11			
2019–20	3	II Liga	Champion^{1}	21–2^{1}			
2020–21	2	I Liga	11th	13-17			
2021–22	2	I Liga	8th	17-15			
2022–23	2	I Liga	Champion	26–8			
2023–24	1	PLK	10th	16–14			
2024–25	1	PLK	10th	13–17	Quarterfinalist	R ENBL	3rd
2025–26	1	PLK	3rd	22–17	Quarterfinalist	R ENBL	Champion

^1 Cancelled due to the COVID-19 pandemic in Europe.
