= European North Basketball League =

Professional men's club basketball competition in Europe

- Founded: 2021; 5 years ago
- First season: 2021–22
- Region: Europe
- Confederation: FIBA Europe
- Number of teams: 18
- Current champions: (Poland) Dziki Warsaw (1st title)
- Most championships: (Poland) Anwil Włocławek (Denmark) Bakken Bears (Poland) BM Stal Ostrów Wielkopolski (Romania) CSO Voluntari (Poland) Dziki Warsaw (1 title each)
- CEO: Edgars Zanders
- President: Igo Zanders
- TV partners: Best4Sport TV
- Website: www.enbleague.eu
- 2026–27 season

The European North Basketball League (ENBL) is a professional men's club basketball league, established in 2021 across Europe. Despite its name, the league is not limited to Northern Europe. Clubs participate without formal qualification or performance criteria, and are selected arbitrarily.

== History ==
The first season featured eight teams from Poland, Czech Republic, Lithuania, Latvia, Estonia, Belarus and Russia, including several national medalists with wide regional and international experience.

The second season saw an expansion to 16 teams within two groups. While Belarusian and Russian teams were excluded, teams from Israel, Ukraine and Kosovo joined. A team from Serbia also joined but withdrew at the last moment, meaning the participating teams dropped to 15.

In the third season the league were joined by teams from Belgium, Bulgaria, Denmark, Great Britain, Netherlands and Romania. The Final Four was held at the Danish city of Aarhus in April 2024.

== Competition format ==
The regular season is divided into two groups. Four teams from each group will advance to play-offs. Each tie in the quarter-finals phase is played over two legs. The winning teams qualify for the Final Four tournament.

== Summary ==
Year	Clubs	Final			Semifinalists		
Year	Clubs	Champions	Score	Second place	Third place	Score	Fourth place
2021–22; Details	8	(Poland) Anwil Włocławek	90–79	(Lithuania) Šiauliai	(Czech Republic) Brno	80–76	(Estonia) Tartu Ülikool Maks & Moorits
2022–23; Details	15	(Poland) BM Stal Ostrów Wielkopolski	70–66	(Lithuania) BC Wolves	(Poland) Start Lublin	86–62	(Poland) King Szczecin
2023–24; Details	16	(Denmark) Bakken Bears	85–81	(Romania) CSO Voluntari	(Belgium) RSW Liège	83–73	(Lithuania) Šiauliai
2024–25; Details	18	(Romania) CSO Voluntari	95–82	(United Kingdom) Newcastle Eagles	(Poland) Dziki Warsaw	80–78	(Slovakia) Inter Bratislava
2025–26; Details	26	(Poland) Dziki Warsaw	109-97	(United Kingdom) Manchester Basketball	(Germany) Mitteldeutscher BC	92–76	(Romania) CSO Voluntari

=== Titles by club ===
Rank	Club	Champions	Runners-up	Championship years
1.	(Romania) CSO Voluntari	1	1	2025
2.	(Poland) Anwil Włocławek	1	—	2022
2.	(Poland) BM Stal Ostrów Wielkopolski	1	—	2023
2.	(Denmark) Bakken Bears	1	—	2024
2.	(Poland) Dziki Warsaw	1	—	2026
3.	(Lithuania) BC Wolves	—	1	—
3.	(Lithuania) Šiauliai	—	1	—
3.	(United Kingdom) Newcastle Eagles	—	1	—
3.	(United Kingdom) Manchester Basketball	—	1	—

=== Titles by country ===
	Country	Championships	Runner-ups	Championship years
1	Poland	3	—	2022, 2023, 2026
2	Romania	1	1	2025
3	Denmark	1	—	2024
4	Lithuania	—	2	—
5	(United Kingdom) Great Britain	—	2	—

== See also ==
- North European Basketball League
- European Women's Basketball League
