= CSO Voluntari =

Romanian multi sport organisation

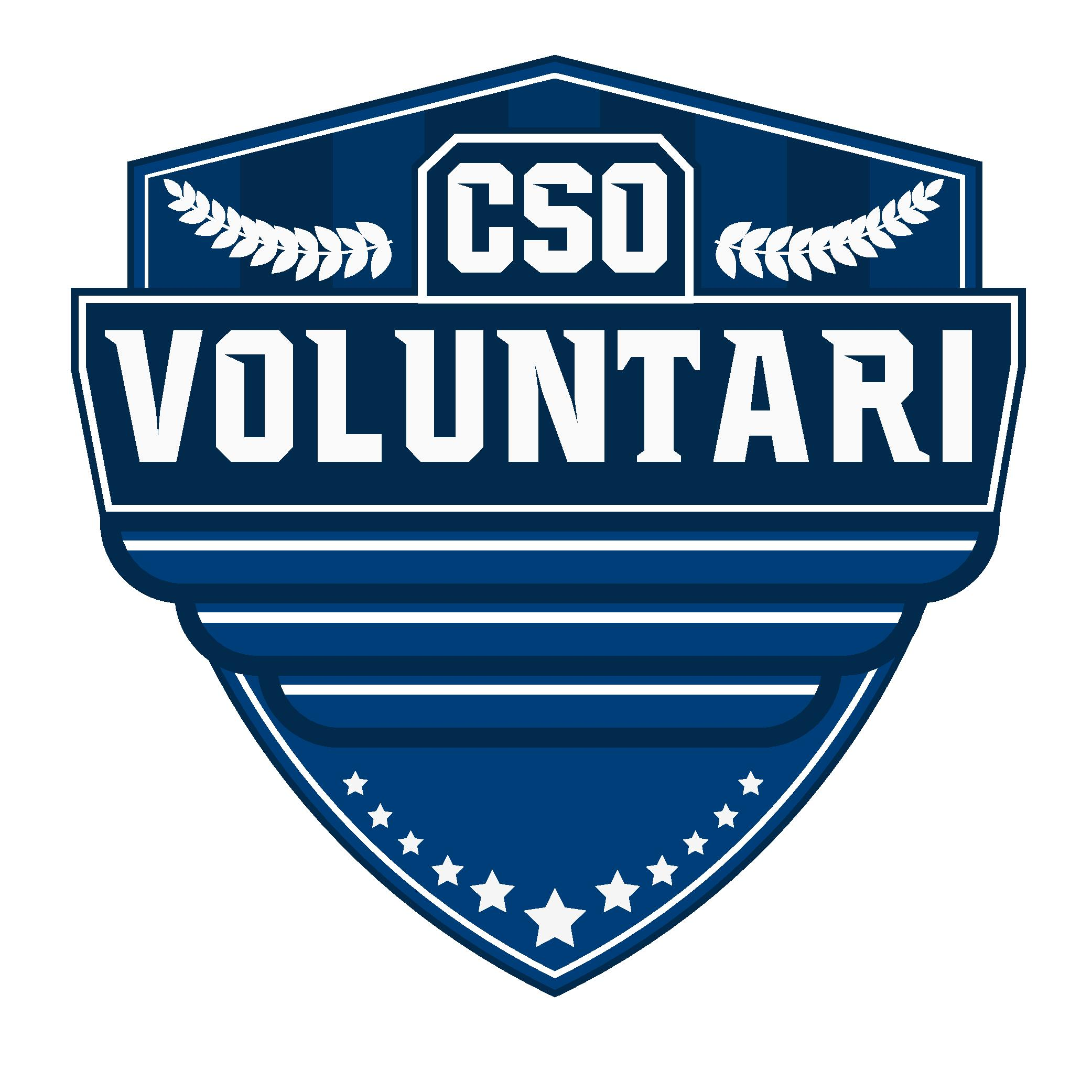
- Formation: 2005; 21 years ago
- Headquarters: Strada Buziaș 13, Voluntari, Romania
- Website: csovoluntari.ro

Club Sportiv Orășenesc Voluntari (CSO) is a multi-sport club based in Voluntari, Romania.

CSO Voluntari was founded in 2005 and currently encompasses 14 sports disciplines, with the women’s volleyball and men’s basketball teams standing out as its most successful departments.

== History ==
The club was founded in 2005 and has grown through training, competitions, medals, trophies, and athlete development. Its main goal is to promote sports within the Voluntari community by providing optimal conditions and continuous support. Currently, 1,200 children participate in free sports activities across 15 professionally managed sections. The club also organizes local and national events.

== Departments ==
CSO Voluntari has the following sections:

- Athletics
- Badminton
- Basketball: CSO Voluntari (basketball)
- Boxing
- Dance sport
- Handball
- Field hockey
- Gōjū Karate
- Shōtōkan Karate
- Kickboxing
- Wrestling
- Swimming
- Table tennis
- Volleyball
