= Twarde Pierniki Toruń =

- Leagues: PLK
- Founded: 2004; 22 years ago
- History: Twarde Pierniki Toruń (2004–present)
- Arena: Arena Toruń
- Capacity: 6,284
- Location: Toruń, Poland
- Head coach: Srđan Subotić
- Team captain: Damian Kulig
- Championships: 1 Polish Cup
- Website: twardepierniki.pl
Home	Away

Twarde Pierniki Toruń is a Polish professional basketball team based in Toruń. The team currently plays in the Polish Basketball League (PLK). The club has won Polish Cup and Polish Supercup titles in 2018. Currently the team plays under the name Arriva Polski Cukier Toruń due to sponsorship commitments.

== History ==
Twarde Pierniki was founded in 2004. Toruń was offered a spot in the 2014–15 PLK season as a wild card because of the expansion from 12 to 16 teams. In the 2016–17 season, Toruń had its best season in club history and reached the PLK Finals. Here it lost to Stelmet Zielona Góra which meant the team ended in second place.

Toruń won its first trophy in on 19 February 2018, when it beat Zielona Góra 88–80 in the final of the Polish Cup, behind Karol Gruszecki who was named Most Valuable Player of the tournament.

Team also starts next season with winning the Polish Basketball Supercup. Another time Karol Gruszecki was named Most Valuable Player of the final match.

== Sponsorship names ==
Due to sponsorship reasons, the club has been known as:

- MMKS VIII LO SIDEn Toruń (2004–2005)
- SIDEn MMKS VIII LO Toruń (2005–2011)
- SIDEn Polski Cukier Toruń (2011–2014)
- Polski Cukier Toruń (2014–2021)
- Arriva Twarde Pierniki Toruń (2023)
- Arriva Polski Cukier Toruń (2023–present)

== Honours ==
- Polish League

Runners-up (2): 2016–17, 2018–19

- Polish League

3rd place (1): 2017–18

- Polish Cup

Winners (1): 2018

- Polish Supercup

Winners (1): 2018

== Season by season ==
Season	Tier	League	Pos.	Polish Cup	European competitions	
2004–05	4	3 Liga				
2005–06	3	2 Liga	4th			
2006–07	3	2 Liga	4th			
2007–08	3	2 Liga	3rd			
2008–09	3	2 Liga	5th			
2009–10	3	2 Liga	7th			
2010–11	3	2 Liga	1st			
2011–12	2	1 Liga	9th			
2012–13	2	1 Liga	4th			
2013–14	2	1 Liga	1st			
2014–15	1	PLK	9th			
2015–16	1	PLK	5th	Quarterfinalist		
2016–17	1	PLK	2nd	Quarterfinalist		
2017–18	1	PLK	3rd	Champion		
2018–19	1	PLK	2nd	Quarterfinalist	Champions League	QR3
2019–20	1	PLK	5th	Runner-up	Champions League	RS
2020–21	1	PLK	10th			
2021–22	1	PLK	7th	Quarterfinalist		
2022–23	1	PLK	15th			
2023–24	1	PLK	12th	Quarterfinalist		
2024–25	1	PLK	9th			
2025–26	1	PLK	12th			

== Players ==
=== Current roster ===
Note: Flags indicate national team eligibility at FIBA-sanctioned events. Players may hold other non-FIBA nationalities not displayed.

Twarde Pierniki Toruń roster
Players
Coaches

Pos.	No.	Nat.	Name	Ht.
PF	0	(United States)	Vander Plas, Ben	2.03 m (6 ft 8 in)	28 – 19 September 1998
G	1	(United States)	Cousins, Isaiah	1.93 m (6 ft 4 in)	32 – 13 March 1994
PG	2	(Canada)	Šakota, Luka	1.98 m (6 ft 6 in)	25 – 17 February 2001
PG	6	(Poland)	Sowiński, Paweł	1.90 m (6 ft 3 in)	20 – 28 October 2005
PF	8	(Poland)	Kenig, Maciej	1.98 m (6 ft 6 in)	19 – 9 June 2007
PF	17	(Poland)	Lipiński, Hubert	2.02 m (6 ft 8 in)	20 – 17 December 2005
F	18	(Sweden)	Gaddefors, Viktor	2.01 m (6 ft 7 in)	34 – 8 October 1992
F	19	(Poland)	Szumański, Jan	1.93 m (6 ft 4 in)	19 – 20 October 2006
SF	27	(Poland)	Prokopowicz, Hubert	1.95 m (6 ft 5 in)	21 – 19 July 2005
SG	32	(Poland)	Wilczek, Maksymilian	1.98 m (6 ft 6 in)	22 – 13 June 2004
SG	35	(Latvia)	Klips, Kristaps	1.96 m (6 ft 5 in)	25 – 20 March 2001
C	77	(Poland)	Kulig, Damian (C)	2.06 m (6 ft 9 in)	39 – 23 June 1987

Head coach

- (Croatia) Srđan Subotić

Assistant coach(es)

- (Poland) Jarosław Zawadka
- (Poland) Bartosz Diduszko

Legend

- (C) Team captain
- Injured

- Roster
Updated: August 31, 2026

== Coaches ==
- (Poland) Marek Ziółkowski
- (Poland) Grzegorz Sowiński: 2008–2011, 2013–2014
- (Poland) Jarosław Zyskowski: 2011–2012
- (Poland) Eugeniusz Kijewski: 2012–2013
- (Serbia) Milija Bogicević: 2014–2015
- (Poland) Jacek Winnicki: 2015–2017
- (Slovenia) Dejan Mihevc: 2017–2019
- (Germany) Sebastian Machowski: 2019–2020
- (Poland) Jaroslaw Zawadka: 2020–2021
- (Croatia) Ivica Skelin: 2021–2022
- (Serbia) Miloš Mitrović: 2022–2023
- (France) Cédric Heitz: 2023
- (Croatia) Srđan Subotić: 2023–present

== Individual awards ==
Polish Cup MVP

- Karol Gruszecki – 2018

Polish Supercup MVP

- Karol Gruszecki – 2018

PLK Most Improved Player

- Krzysztof Sulima – 2017

PLK Best Coach

- Dejan Mihevc – 2018

All-1 Liga Team

- Tomasz Wojdyła – 2014

All-PLK Team

- Danny Gibson – 2016
- Maksym Korniyenko – 2016
- Aaron Cel – 2018, 2019

== Notable players ==
Note: Flags indicate national team eligibility at FIBA-sanctioned events. Players may hold other non-FIBA nationalities not displayed.

Criteria

To appear in this section a player must have either:

- Set a club record or won an individual award while at the club
- Played at least one official international match for their national team at any time
- Played at least one official NBA match at any time.

- (Nigeria) Alade Aminu
- (Poland) Aaron Cel
- (Canada) Sean Denison
- (Poland) Karol Gruszecki
- (United States) Danny Gibson
- (Poland) Przemek Karnowski
- (Ukraine) Maksym Korniyenko
- (Poland) Damian Kulig
- (Senegal) Cheikh Mbodj
- (United States) Obie Trotter
- (United States) Kyle Weaver
