= 2018 Polish Basketball Cup =

Polish Basketball Cup
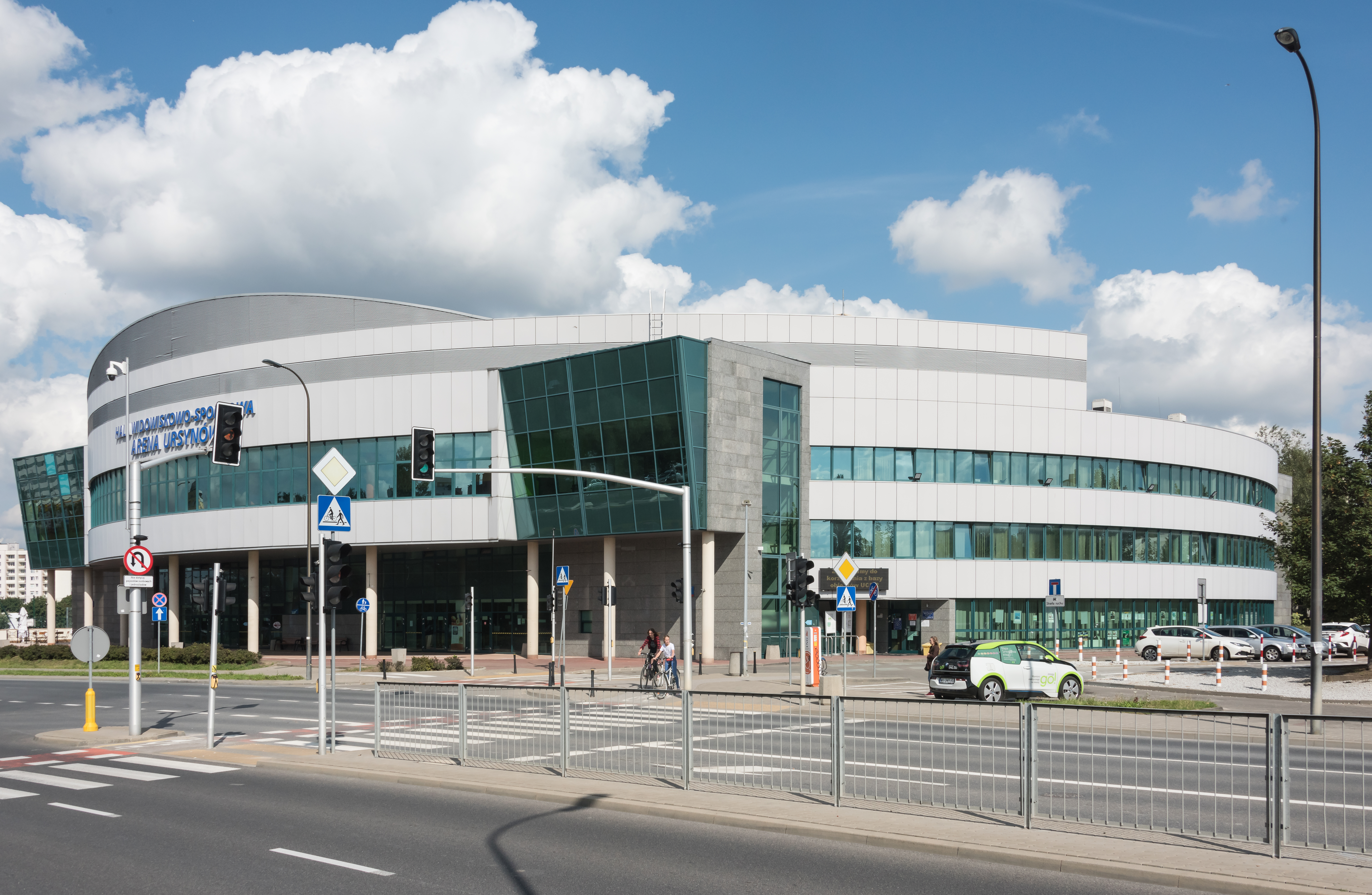
- The Arena Ursynów hosted the tournament
- Season: 2018
- Duration: 15–19 February
- Games played: 7
- Teams: 8

Finals
- Champions: Polski Cukier Toruń (1st title)
- Runners-up: Stelmet Enea Zielona Góra

Awards
- MVP: Karol Gruszecki

The 2018 Polish Basketball Cup (Polish: Puchar Polski 2018) was the 55th edition of Poland's national cup competition for men basketball teams. It was managed by the Polish Basketball League (PLK) and was held in Warsaw, in the Arena Ursynów in February 2018. Polski Cukier Toruń won its first-ever Cup title in club history.

== Qualified teams ==
The eight first qualified after the first half of the 2017–18 PLK season qualified to the tournament. The highest placed four teams would play the lowest seeded teams in the quarter-finals. Legia Warsaw qualified as host of the tournament, and gained automatic qualification.

== Draw ==
Matches were drawn on 11 January 2018.

== Bracket ==
Quarterfinals; 15–16 February
MKS Dąbrowa Górnicza	64
PGE Turów	67
Polski Cukier Toruń	83
Start Lublin	71
Anwil Włocławek	87
Asseco Gdynia	73
Stelmet Enea Zielona Góra	109
Legia Warsaw	63

Semifinals; 17–18 February
PGE Turów	72
Polski Cukier Toruń	79
Anwil Włocławek	77
Stelmet Enea Zielona Góra	88

Final; 19 February
Polski Cukier Toruń	88
Stelmet Enea Zielona Góra	80

== Final ==
19 February 2018	Polski Cukier Toruń	88–80	Stelmet Enea Zielona Góra	Warsaw
17:45 CET (UTC+01:00)	Scoring by quarter: 27–15, 24–16, 21–20, 16–29
	Pts: Cosey 36; Rebs: Mbodj 9 Asts: Wiśniewski 3	Boxscore	Pts: Gecevičius 19; Rebs: Dragičević 9 Asts: Koszarek, Gecevičius 5	Arena: Arena Ursynów; Referees: Janusz Calik, Dariusz Zapolski, Michał Sosin

Starters:			Pts	Reb	Ast
PG	00	(United States) Glenn Cosey	36	3	1
SG	12	(Poland) Bartosz Diduszko	8	2	1
SF	13	(Poland) Karol Gruszecki	13	4	1
PF	12	(Poland) Łukasz Wiśniewski	7	3	3
C	22	(Senegal) Cheikh Mbodj	8	9	0
Reserves:					
G/F	1	(Poland) Ignacy Grochowski	DNP		
G/F	2	(Poland) Kacper Lambarski	DNP		
G/F	3	(Poland) Paweł Krefft	DNP		
F	4	(Poland) Tomasz Śnieg	2	1	1
F	5	(Poland) Aaron Cel (injured)	DNP		
C	7	(Poland) Krzysztof Sulima	14	7	0
Head coach:
(Basketball Federation of Slovenia) Dejan Mihevc

Toruń	Zielona Góra

Starters:			Pts	Reb	Ast
PG	55	(Poland) Łukasz Koszarek	9	3	5
SG	00	(United States) James Florence	0	3	2
SF	35	(Poland) Przemysław Zamojski	3	1	1
PF	34	(Poland) Adam Hrycaniuk	2	2	0
C	21	(Serbia) Nikola Marković (basketball)	5	4	1
Reserves:					
G	7	(Slovenia) Edo Murić	2	0	0
G	8	(Poland) Filip Matczak	DNP		
G	9	(Spain) Álex Hernández	4	2	2
F	12	(Poland) Jarosław Mokros	15	0	3
F	13	(Lithuania) Martynas Gecevičius	19	5	5
F/C	18	(Montenegro) Vladimir Dragičević	13	9	3
G/F	22	(Poland) Thomas Kelati	8	3	2
Head coach:
(Basketball Federation of Slovenia) Andrej Urlep

== See also ==
- 2017–18 PLK season
