= Adam Waczyński =

Polish basketball player (born 1989)

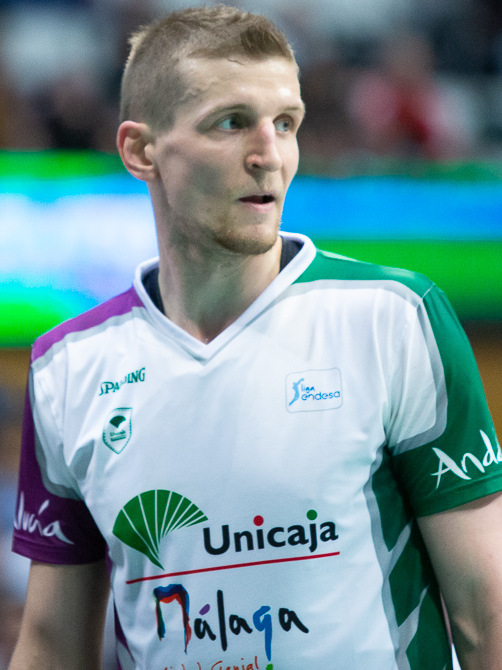
- Waczyński with Unicaja in 2018

Free Agent
- Position: Shooting guard / small forward

Personal information
- Born: October 15, 1989 (age 37) Toruń, Poland
- Listed height: 6 ft 6.5 in (1.99 m)
- Listed weight: 212 lb (96 kg)

Career information
- NBA draft: 2011: undrafted
- Playing career: 2004–present

Career history
- 2004–2008: Prokom Trefl Sopot
- 2006–2008: →OSSM Sopot
- 2007–2008: →Prokom Trefl Sopot II
- 2008–2009: Górnik Wałbrzych
- 2009–2010: PBG Poznań
- 2010–2014: Trefl Sopot
- 2014–2016: Obradoiro CAB
- 2016–2021: Unicaja
- 2021–2022: Casademont Zaragoza
- 2022–2024: Baxi Manresa
- 2024–2025: Śląsk Wrocław

Career highlights
- EuroCup champion (2017); 2× Polish League champion (2005, 2008); Polish League Most Improved Player (2011); 2× Polish Cup winner (2012, 2013); Polish Cup MVP (2013); 2× Polish Supercup winner (2012, 2013)

Adam Waczyński (born October 15, 1989) is a Polish professional basketball player who last played for Śląsk Wrocław of the Polish Basketball League (PLK). He also represents the senior Polish national basketball team. He is a 1.99 m (6'6 1/2") tall shooting guard-small forward.

== Professional career ==
In July 2016, he signed a three-year contract with the Spanish team Unicaja.

In the 2016–17 season, Waczyński won the EuroCup with Unicaja, after beating Valencia in the Finals. On July 17, 2020, he re-signed with Unicaja.

On September 9, 2021, Waczyński signed with Casademont Zaragoza of the Liga ACB.

On November 6, 2024, he signed with Śląsk Wrocław of the Polish Basketball League (PLK).

== National team career ==
Waczyński made his debut with the senior Polish national basketball team at EuroBasket 2011. He also played at the EuroBasket 2013, the EuroBasket 2015, and the EuroBasket 2017.

== Career statistics ==
Legend
| GP | Games played | GS | Games started | MPG | Minutes per game |
| FG% | Field-goal percentage | 3P% | 3-point field-goal percentage | FT% | Free-throw percentage |
| RPG | Rebounds per game | APG | Assists per game | SPG | Steals per game |
| BPG | Blocks per game | PPG | Points per game | PIR | Performance index rating |
| **Bold** | Career high |

=== EuroLeague ===
| Year | Team | GP | GS | MPG | FG% | 3P% | FT% | RPG | APG | SPG | BPG | PPG | PIR |
|---|---|---|---|---|---|---|---|---|---|---|---|---|---|
| 2007–08 | Prokom | 2 | 0 | 6.1 | .400 | .000 | .000 | .5 | .0 | .0 | .0 | 2.0 | 1.5 |
| 2017–18 | Unicaja | **27** | **8** | **18.9** | **.500** | **.495** | **.829** | **2.3** | **1.1** | **.7** | .0 | **10.1** | **8.9** |
| Career | | 29 | 8 | 18.0 | .497 | .490 | .829 | 2.2 | 1.1 | .7 | .0 | 9.5 | 8.4 |

=== National team ===
| Tournament | Pos. | GP | PPG | RPG | APG |
|---|---|---|---|---|---|
| EuroBasket 2011 | 17th | 4 | 0.0 | 0.0 | 0.0 |
| EuroBasket 2013 | 21st | 5 | 4.0 | 1.8 | 0.4 |
| EuroBasket 2015 | 11th | 6 | 15.8 | 2.5 | 1.3 |
| EuroBasket 2017 | 18th | 5 | 14.4 | 3.2 | 3.4 |

== Honours and awards ==
=== Club ===
Prokom Trefl Sopot

- Polish League Champion: 2004–05, 2007–08

Trefl Sopot

- Polish Cup Winner: 2012, 2013
- Polish Supercup Winner: 2012, 2013

Baloncesto Málaga

- EuroCup Champion: 2016–17

=== Individual ===
- Polish League Most Improved Player: 2010–11
- Polish Cup MVP: 2013
