= 2020 Polish Basketball Cup =

Basketball in Poland

Polish Basketball Cup
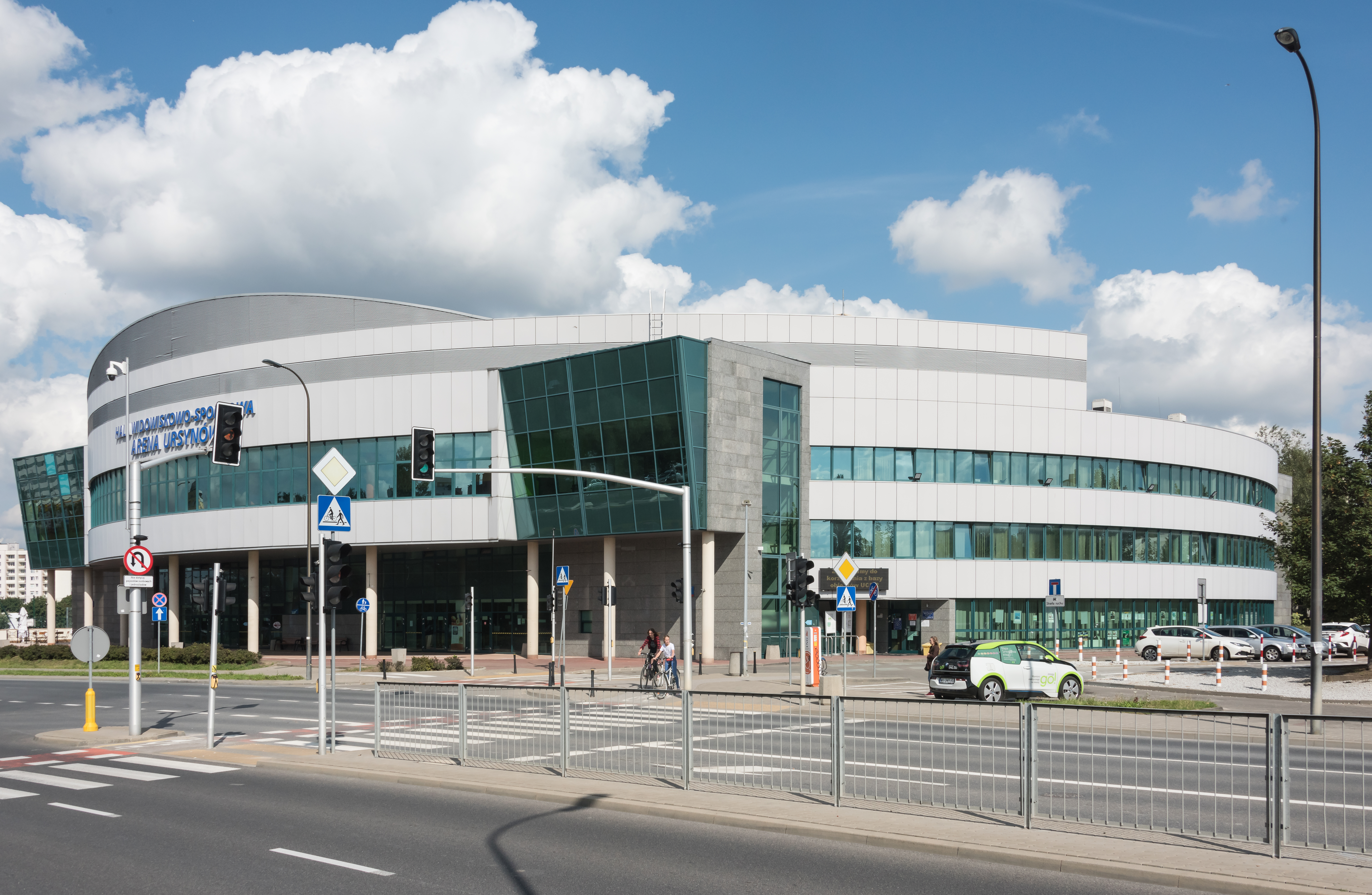
- The Arena Ursynów hosted the tournament
- Season: 2020
- Duration: 13–16 February
- Games played: 7
- Teams: 8

Regular season
- Season MVP: (United States) Shawn Jones

Finals
- Champions: Anwil Włocławek (4th title)
- Runners-up: Twarde Pierniki Toruń
- Semi-finalists: Enea Zastal Zielona Góra, HydroTruck Radom

The 2020 Suzuki Polish Basketball Cup (Polish: Puchar Polski 2020) was the 57th edition of Poland's national cup competition for men basketball teams. It was managed by the Polish Basketball League (PLK) and was held in Warsaw, in the Arena Ursynów for the fourth time in a row. Anwil Włocławek won its fourth Cup title in club history.

== Qualified teams ==
The eight first qualified after the first half of the 2019–20 PLK season qualified to the tournament. The highest-placed four teams would play the lowest-seeded teams in the quarter-finals. Legia Warsaw qualified as host of the tournament, and gained automatic qualification.

== Bracket ==
Quarterfinals; 13–14 February
Legia Warsaw	58
HydroTruck Radom	85
Pszczółka Start Lublin	81
Anwil Włocławek	87
Enea Zastal Zielona Góra	82
Trefl Sopot	75
Polski Cukier Toruń	80
Asseco Arka Gdynia	71

Semifinals; 15 February
HydroTruck Radom	89
Anwil Włocławek	108
Enea Zastal Zielona Góra	69
Polski Cukier Toruń	72

Final; 16 February
Anwil Włocławek	103
Polski Cukier Toruń	96

== Final ==
16 February 2020	Anwil Włocławek	103–96	Polski Cukier Toruń	Warsaw
18:00 CET (UTC+01:00)	Scoring by quarter: 28–28, 26–19, 21–24, 28–25
Polsat Sport Extra	Pts: Jones 27; Rebs: Jones, Sokołowski 5 Asts: Dowe 10; PIR: Jones 34	Report	Pts: Hornsby 21; Rebs: Kulig 5 Asts: Diduszko, Wright 5 PIR: Kulig 21	Arena: Arena Ursynów; Referees: Janusz Calik, Wojciech Liszka, Łukasz Jankowski

== See also ==
- 2019–20 PLK season
