= PLK Most Improved Player =

The PLK Most Improved Player Award is handed out at the end of a given regular season of the Polish Basketball League (PLK). The award was first handed out in the 2005–06 season

== Winners ==
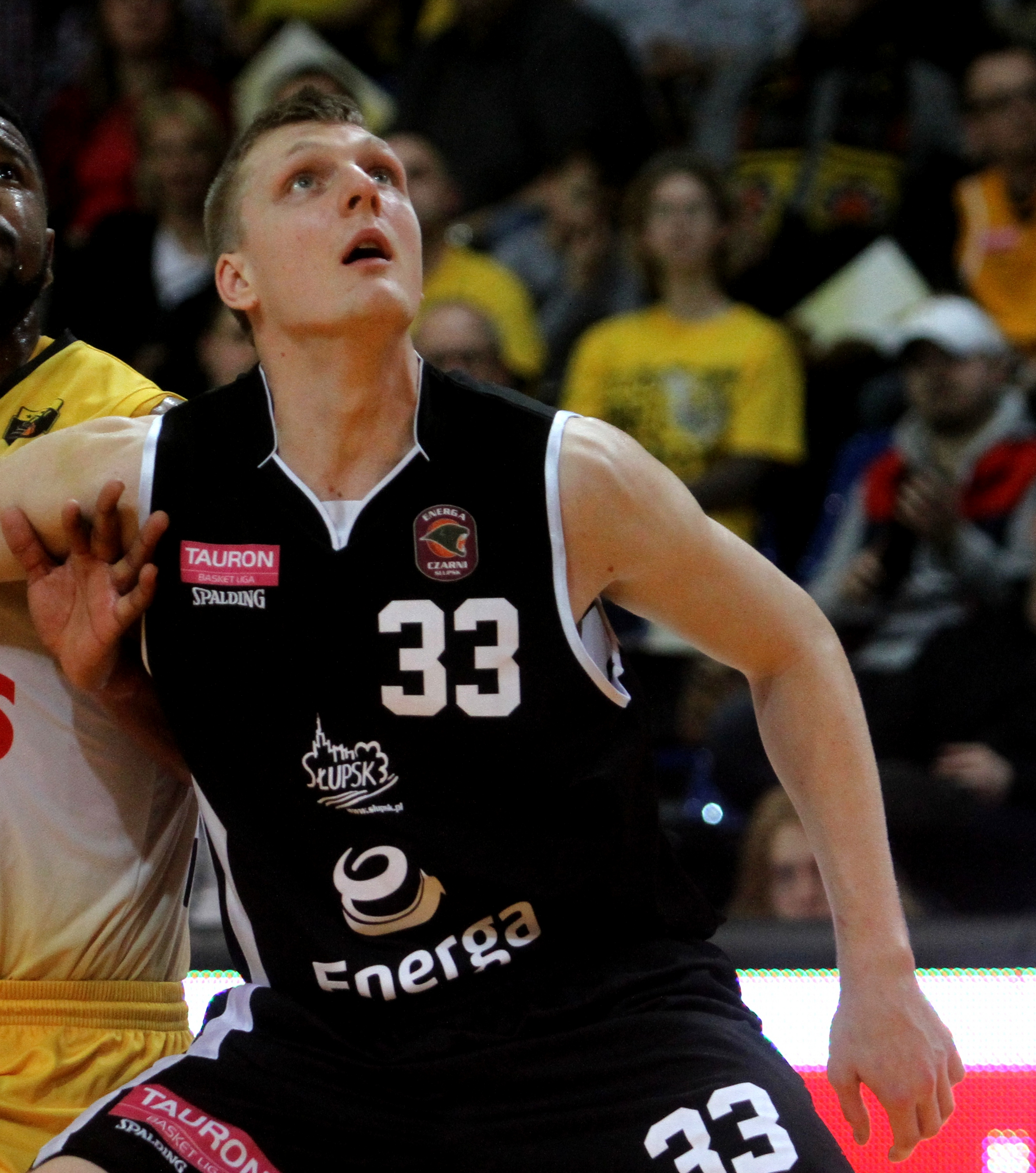
Karol Gruszecki won in the 2014–15 season

Sezon	Zawodnik	Zespół	Ref.
2000–01	Rafał Bigus	Prokom Trefl Sopot	
2005–06	Kamil Chanas	Era Śląsk Wrocław	
2006–07	Iwo Kitzinger	Polpharma Starogard Gdański	
2007–08	Paweł Kikowski	Polpak Świecie	
2007–08	David Logan	Turów Zgorzelec	
2009–10	Łukasz Majewski	Polpharma Starogard Gdański	
2010–11	Adam Waczyński	Trefl Sopot	
2011–12	Damian Kulig	PBG Basket Poznań/PGE Turów Zgorzelec	
2012–13	Jakub Dłoniak	Jezioro Tarnobrzeg	
2013–14	Michał Sokołowski	Anwil Włocławek	
2014–15	Karol Gruszecki	Energa Czarni Słupsk	
2015–16	Daniel Szymkiewicz	Rosa Radom	
2016–17	Krzysztof Sulima	Twarde Pierniki Toruń	
2017–18	Jakub Garbacz	Asseco Gdynia	
2018–19	Jakub Schenk	King Szczecin	
