= Cheikh Mbodj =

Senegalese basketball player (born 1987)

Free agent
- Position: Center

Personal information
- Born: August 1, 1987 (age 39) Dakar, Senegal
- Listed height: 6 ft 10 in (2.08 m)
- Listed weight: 235 lb (107 kg)

Career information
- College: Grayson College (2008–2011); Cincinnati (2011–2013)
- NBA draft: 2013: undrafted
- Playing career: 2013–present

Career history
- 2013–2014: Ilysiakos
- 2014: Cantù
- 2014–2015: Dinamo Sassari
- 2015–2016: Czarni Słupsk
- 2016–2017: Ventspils
- 2017–2019: Polski Cukier Toruń
- 2019–2020: Élan Béarnais Pau-Lacq-Orthez
- 2020–2022: Nishinomiya Storks
- 2022–2024: Bambitious Nara
- 2024: Diablos Rojos del México
- 2024–2025: Iwate Big Bulls
- 2025: Tachikawa Dice

Career highlights
- Polish Cup champion (2018); Italian League champion (2015)

Cheikh Tidiane Mbodj (born August 1, 1987) is a Senegalese professional basketball player for Tachikawa Dice of the B.League. He competed in college basketball for Cincinnati.

== Professional career ==
In the 2017-18 season Mbodj averaged 11 points and five rebounds in the Polish league. On July 17, 2018, he re-signed with Torun.

As a member of Senegal's national basketball team, he competed at the 2015 Afrobasket.

On September 27, 2024, Mbodj signed with the Iwate Big Bulls of the B.League. On February 21, 2025, his contract was terminated, signing with the Tachikawa Dice.
