= Middle Tennessee Blue Raiders men's basketball =

2026–27 Middle Tennessee Blue Raiders men's basketball team
- University: Middle Tennessee State University
- Head coach: Nick McDevitt (9th season)
- Location: Murfreesboro, Tennessee
- Arena: Murphy Center (capacity: 11,520)
- Conference: Conference USA
- Nickname: Blue Raiders
- Colors: Royal blue and white

NCAA Division I tournament round of 32
- 1975, 1977, 1982, 1989, 2016, 2017

NCAA Division I tournament appearances
- 1975, 1977, 1982, 1985, 1987, 1989, 2013, 2016, 2017

Conference tournament champions
- 1975, 1977, 1982, 1985, 1989, 2016, 2017

Conference regular-season champions
- 1975, 1978, 1986, 1987, 1989, 2012, 2013, 2014, 2017, 2018

Conference division champions
- 2022

Uniforms
Home	Away

The Middle Tennessee Blue Raiders men's basketball team is the basketball team that represents Middle Tennessee State University in Murfreesboro, Tennessee, United States. The school's team currently competes in Conference USA and are currently led by seventh-year head coach Nick McDevitt. The Blue Raiders have appeared nine times in the NCAA tournament, most recently in 2017. Middle Tennessee has six appearances in the NCAA round of 32 with upsets in 2016 over 2-seed Michigan State and 2017 upset over 5-seed Minnesota.

== Postseason results ==
=== NCAA tournament results ===
The Blue Raiders have appeared in the NCAA tournament nine times. Their combined record is 4–9. The 2015–16 season was most notable after MTSU became just the eighth #15 seed to win a game, winning against Michigan State.

Year	Round	Opponent	Result
1975	Regional Quarterfinals	Oregon State	L 67–78
1977	Regional Quarterfinals	Detroit	L 76–93
1982	First Round; Second Round	Kentucky; Louisville	W 50–44; L 56–81
1985	First Round	North Carolina	L 57–76
1987	First Round	Notre Dame	L 71–84
1989	First Round; Second Round	Florida State; Virginia	W 97–83; L 88–104
2013	First Four	Saint Mary's	L 54–67
2016	First Round; Second Round	Michigan State; Syracuse	W 90–81; L 50–75
2017	First Round; Second Round	Minnesota; Butler	W 81–72; L 65–74

=== NAIA Tournament results ===
The Blue Raiders have appeared in the NAIA Tournament one time. Their record is 0–1.

Year	Round	Opponent	Result
1955	First Round	Southeastern Oklahoma State	L 67–120

=== NIT results ===
The Blue Raiders have appeared in the National Invitation Tournament (NIT) five times. Their combined record is 5–5.

Year	Round	Opponent	Result
1986	First Round	Clemson	L 81–99
1988	First Round; Second Round; Quarterfinals	Tennessee; Georgia; Boston College	W 85–80; W 69–54; L 69–78
2012	First Round; Second Round; Quarterfinals	Marshall; Tennessee; Minnesota	W 86–78; W 71–64; L 72–78
2018	First Round; Second Round	Vermont; Louisville	W 91–64; L 68–84
2025	First Round	Chattanooga	L 103–109^{3OT}

=== CBI results ===
The Blue Raiders have appeared in the College Basketball Invitational (CBI) one time. Their combined record is 3–1.

Year	Seed	Round	Opponent	Result
2022	#2	First Round; Quarterfinals; Semifinals; Championship	#15 California Baptist #10 Boston University #6 Abilene Christian #9 UNC Wilmington	W 64–58; W 76–46; W 85–69; L 90–96^{2OT}

=== CIT results ===
The Blue Raiders have appeared in the CollegeInsider.com Postseason Tournament (CIT) two times. Their combined record is 0–2.

Year	Round	Opponent	Result
2010	First Round	Missouri State	L 79–87
2015	First Round	Kent State	L 56–68

== Notable players ==
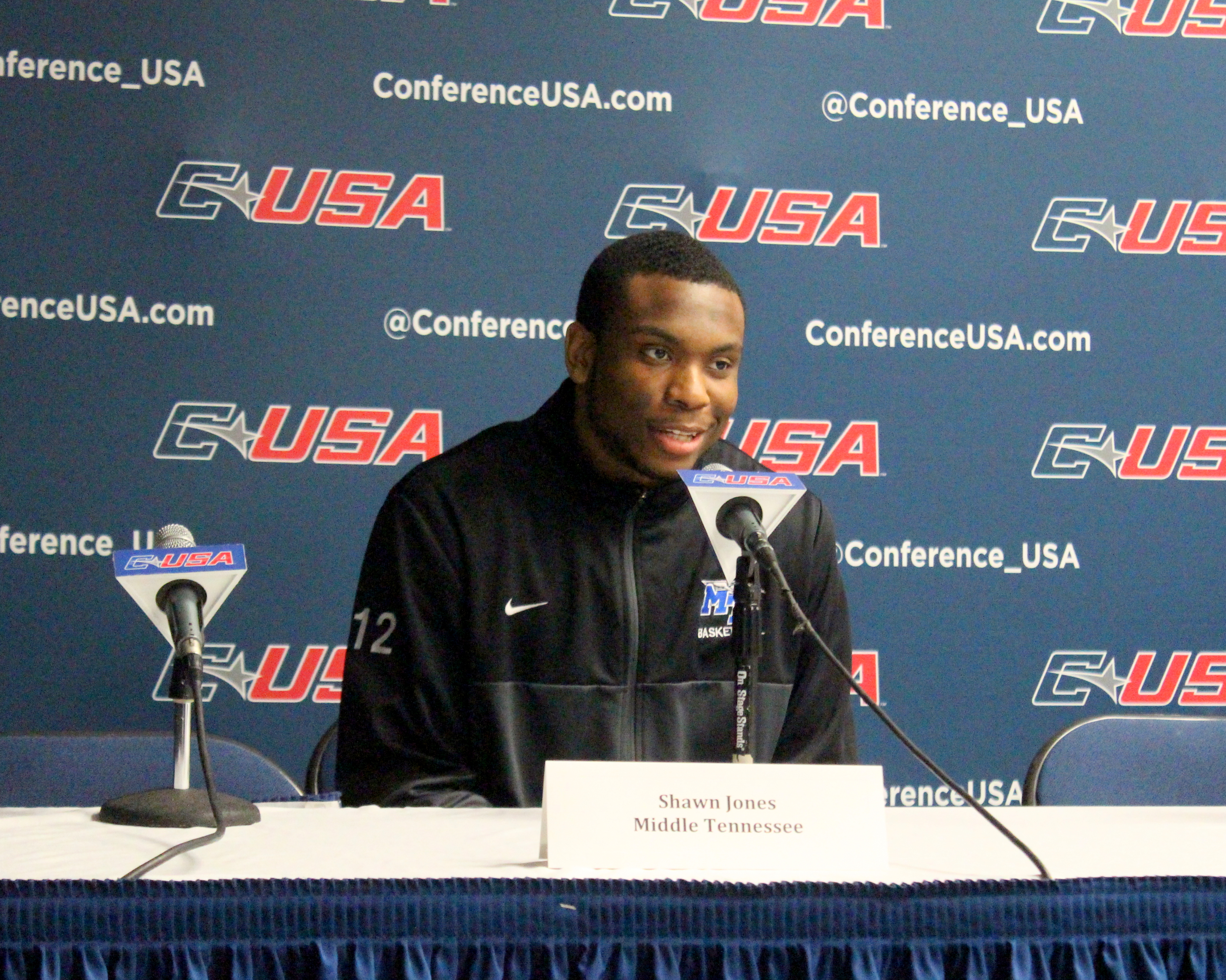
Shawn Jones

- Shawn Jones (born 1992), for Hapoel Haifa of the Israeli Basketball Premier League
- Reggie Upshaw (born 1995), in the Israel Basketball Premier League
- JaCorey Williams (born 1994), for Hapoel Jerusalem of the Israeli Basketball Premier League
