= Shawn Jones (basketball) =

American basketball player (born 1992)

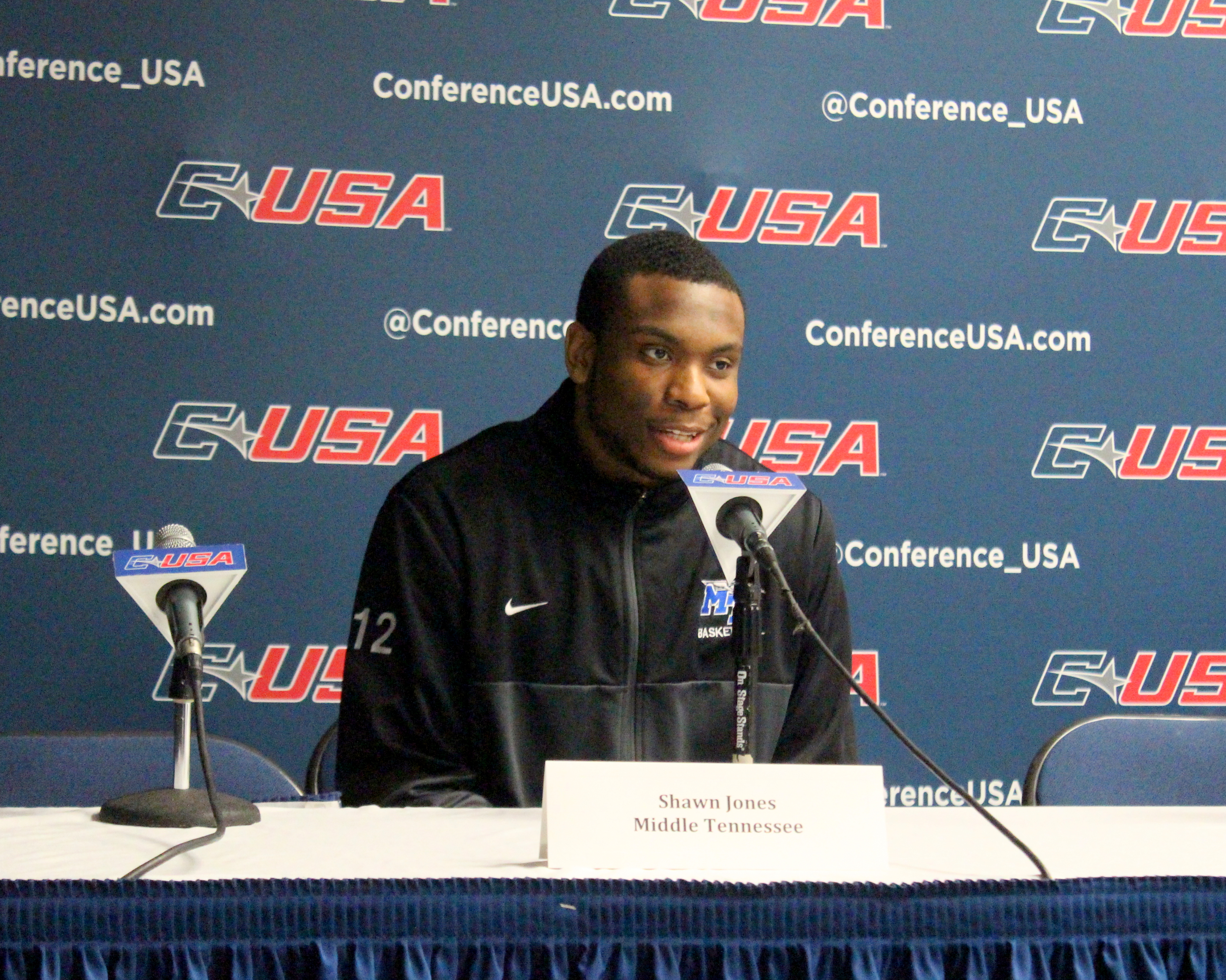
- Jones in 2014 at a CUSA press conference

No. 21 – Trepça
- Position: Center
- League: Kosovo Basketball Superleague

Personal information
- Born: March 25, 1992 (age 34) Miami, Florida, U.S.
- Listed height: 6 ft 8 in (2.03 m)
- Listed weight: 235 lb (107 kg)

Career information
- High school: Hialeah (Hialeah, Florida)
- College: Middle Tennessee (2010–2014)
- NBA draft: 2014: undrafted
- Playing career: 2014–present

Career history
- 2014–2015: Sioux Falls Skyforce
- 2015–2016: Andorra
- 2016–2017: Hapoel Jerusalem
- 2017: →Sidigas Avellino
- 2017–2018: Dinamo Sassari
- 2018–2019: Hapoel Holon
- 2019–2021: Anwil Włocławek
- 2021–2022: Split
- 2022: Spójnia Stargard
- 2022–2023: Hapoel Haifa
- 2023–2024: Cedevita Olimpija
- 2024–2025: Legia Warsaw
- 2025: Marinos
- 2025–present: Trepça

Career highlights
- Kosovo Superleague champion (2026); Kosovo Cup winner (2026); Slovenian League champion (2024); 2× Polish Cup winner (2019, 2020); Slovenian Cup winner (2024); Israeli League Cup winner (2016); Polish Cup MVP (2020); NBA D-League All-Rookie Second Team (2015); Conference USA Player of the Year (2014); AP honorable mention All-American (2014); First-team All-Conference USA (2014)
- Stats at Basketball Reference

Shawn Jones (born March 25, 1992) is an American-born Kosovan professional basketball player for Trepça of the Kosovo Basketball Superleague. He played college basketball for Middle Tennessee State University, where he was named the Conference USA Men's Basketball Player of the Year in 2014.

== High school career ==
Jones attended Hialeah High School in Hialeah, Florida. As a senior in 2009–10, he averaged 23.3 points, 14.3 rebounds and 9.1 blocks per game as he earned first team All-Dade County and third team All-State honors.

== College career ==
In his four-year career at Middle Tennessee State, Jones played 131 games (62 starts), averaging 8.5 points, 4.9 rebounds and 1.2 blocks per game. In his senior season in 2013–14, he was named the Conference USA Men's Basketball Player of the Year. He was also named to the Conference USA first team and NABC Division I All-District 11 first team, while also being named a participant of the Reese's College All-Star Game.

== Professional career ==
After going undrafted in the 2014 NBA draft, Jones joined the Los Angeles Clippers for the 2014 NBA Summer League. On September 23, 2014, he signed with the Miami Heat. However, he was later waived by the Heat on October 25, 2014, after appearing in four preseason games. On November 3, 2014, he was acquired by the Sioux Falls Skyforce of the NBA Development League as an affiliate player. In 49 games for the Skyforce in 2014–15, he averaged 13.1 points, 8.8 rebounds, and 1.2 blocks per game.

In July 2015, Jones joined the Washington Wizards for the 2015 NBA Summer League. On August, 14, he signed a one-year deal with MoraBanc Andorra of the Liga ACB. On October 25, 2015, Jones recorded a career-high 23 points, shooting 10-of-11 from the field, along with six rebounds in a 74–77 loss to Manresa.

On July 11, 2016, Jones signed a three-year deal with Hapoel Jerusalem. Jones helped Jerusalem to win the 2016 Israeli League Cup, as well as reaching the 2017 EuroCup Semifinals, where they eventually were eliminated by Valencia. On April 20, 2017, he was loaned to Sidigas Avellino for the rest of the season.

On June 22, 2017, Jones signed with Dinamo Sassari for the 2017–18 season. In 30 games played for Sassari, Jones averaged 10.0 points and 6.6 rebounds per game.

On August 21, 2018, Jones returned to Israel for a second stint, signing a one-year deal with Hapoel Holon. On March 9, 2019, Jones recorded 21 points, shooting 7-of-10 from the field, along with six rebounds and three blocks in a 96–95 overtime win over Ironi Nes Ziona. He was subsequently named Israeli League Round 21 MVP. Jones helped Holon reach the 2019 FIBA Europe Cup Semifinals, where they eventually were eliminated by his former team Dinamo Sassari.

On July 20, 2019, Jones signed with Boulazac Basket Dordogne for the 2019–20 season. On October 9, 2019, his contract was terminated due to an incident in the preseason game against Nanterre. On November 8, 2019, Jones signed a one-year deal with Anwil Włocławek of the Polish Basketball League. On December 8, 2020, he signed again with Anwil and joined the team for a second season.

On August 1, 2022, he signed with Spójnia Stargard of the Polish Basketball League (PLK). In eight games he averaged 14.2 points and 8.6 rebounds per game.

On November 24, 2022, he signed with Hapoel Haifa of the Israeli Basketball Premier League.

On June 16, 2025, he signed with Trepça of the Kosovo Basketball Superleague.

== The Basketball Tournament ==
In 2017, Jones participated in The Basketball Tournament for Blue Zoo, a team of Middle Tennessee alumni. The team was eliminated in the first round. The Basketball Tournament is an annual $2 million winner-take-all tournament broadcast on ESPN.

== Kosovo national team ==
On July 11, 2016, Jones received a Kosovan passport, and became a member of the Kosovo national basketball team.

On February 23, 2018, Jones made his first appearance for Kosovo in the 2019 FIBA Basketball World Cup qualification game against Poland.

== Personal life ==
Jones is the son of Andrew and Cynthia Jones.

== Career statistics ==
Legend
GP	Games played	MPG	Minutes per game	FG%	Field goal percentage
3P%	3-point field goal percentage	FT%	Free throw percentage	RPG	Rebounds per game
APG	Assists per game	SPG	Steals per game	BPG	Blocks per game
PPG	Points per game	**Bold**	Career high		Led the league

=== College ===
Year	Team	GP	GS	MPG	FG%	3P%	FT%	RPG	APG	SPG	BPG	PPG
2010–11	Middle Tennessee	32	2	10.9	.505	.000	.684	2.3	.3	.3	.6	4.1
2011–11	Middle Tennessee	32	1	16.2	.551	.000	.585	3.3	.2	.4	1.2	7.3
2012–13	Middle Tennessee	34	26	21.1	.498	.000	.635	5.4	.4	.3	1.3	8.5
2013–14	Middle Tennessee	33	33	28.2	.577	.000	.687	8.5	.6	.9	1.9	14.2
