= Karol Gruszecki =

Polish basketball player (born 1989)

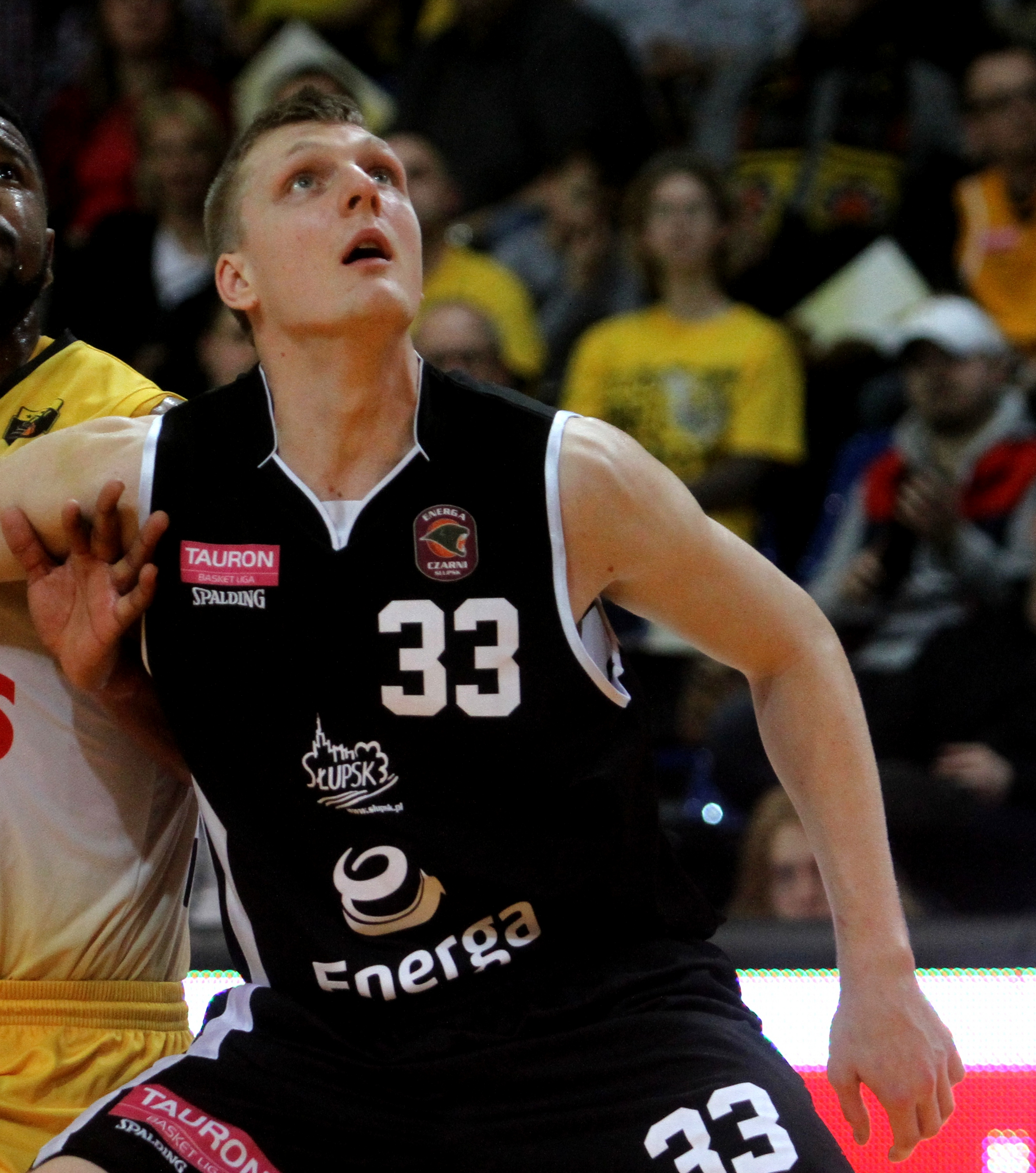
- Gruszecki with Czarni Słupsk in 2014

Free Agent
- Position: Shooting guard / small forward

Personal information
- Born: 4 November 1989 (age 37) Łódź, Poland
- Listed height: 6 ft 5 in (1.96 m)
- Listed weight: 201 lb (91 kg)

Career information
- College: North Platte CC (2009–2011); Texas–Arlington (2011–2013)
- NBA draft: 2013: undrafted
- Playing career: 2013–present

Career history
- 2013–2014: Spirou Charleroi
- 2014: →Czarni Słupsk
- 2014–2015: Czarni Słupsk
- 2015–2017: Zielona Góra
- 2017–2020: Polski Cukier Toruń
- 2020–2022: Trefl Sopot
- 2022–2024: Spójnia Stargard
- 2024–2025: Anwil Włocławek
- 2025–2026: Enea Abramczyk Astoria Bydgoszcz

Career highlights
- Polish Cup champion (2018); Polish Cup MVP (2018); All-PLK Team (2015); PLK Most Improved Player (2015)

Karol Gruszecki (born 4 November 1989) is a Polish professional basketball player who last played for Enea Abramczyk Astoria Bydgoszcz of the Bank Pekao S.A. I Liga and the Polish national basketball team.

== Professional career ==
Gruszecki signed with Spirou Charleroi in Belgium for the 2013–14 season. He finished the season in his home country of Poland, on loan with Czarni Słupsk. For the next season, Gruszecki signed a full contract with Czarni Słupsk. After the 2014–15 season, he was named to the All-PLK First Team. He also finished as runner-up in the voting for Best Polish Player. He signed with reigning PLK champion and EuroLeague team Stelmet Zielona Góra in the 2015 offseason. He played with them for two seasons before signing with Pierniki Toruń.

On 19 February 2018, Torún won its first trophy when it beat Zielona Góra 88–80 in the final of the Polish Cup. Gruszecki was named the tournament's Most Valuable Player.

On July 15, 2020, he has signed with Trefl Sopot of PLK.v

On June 28, 2022, he has signed with Spójnia Stargard of the Polish Basketball League (PLK).

On July 18, 2024, he signed with Anwil Włocławek of the Polish Basketball League (PLK).

== International career ==
Gruszecki was selected for the Polish national basketball team for EuroBasket 2015 and 2017.
