= Adewale Ojomo =

American gridiron football player (born 1988)

No. 71
- Position: Defensive end

Personal information
- Born: November 11, 1988 (age 38); Opa-locka, Florida, U.S.
- Listed height: 6 ft 4 in (1.93 m)
- Listed weight: 270 lb (122 kg)

Career information
- High school: Hialeah (Hialeah, Florida)
- College: Miami (FL)
- NFL draft: 2012: undrafted

Career history
- New York Giants (2012–2013); Seattle Seahawks (2013)*; Buffalo Bills (2013)*; Tennessee Titans (2013–2014)*; Los Angeles KISS (2014); Dallas Cowboys (2014)*; Hamilton Tiger-Cats (2014)*
- * Offseason or practice squad member only
- Stats at Pro Football Reference

Adewale Ojomo (born November 11, 1988) is an American former football defensive end. He signed with the New York Giants as an undrafted free agent. He played college football at the University of Miami.

== Early life ==
Ojomo attended Hialeah High School in Florida. He was rated as the No. 72 player in the state by the Orlando Sentinel.

== College career ==
He played college football at the University of Miami. Ojomo finished college with 79 tackles, 9.5 sacks, 3 pass deflections, 2 forced fumbles.

In his freshman season, Ojomo had 22 tackles, 3 sacks, a pass deflection and a forced fumble.

In his junior season, he had 38 tackles, 5 sacks and a pass deflection. On September 2, 2010, in the season opener against Florida A&M in which Ojomo recorded 3 tackles and 2 sacks helping the Miami Hurricanes win 45-0.

In his senior season, Ojomo had 19 tackles, 1.5 sacks, a pass deflection and a forced fumble.

== Professional career ==
=== New York Giants ===
On May 1, 2012, Ojomo signed with the New York Giants as an Undrafted free agent.

=== Seattle Seahawks ===
He was signed to the Seahawks' practice squad on September 17, 2013.

=== Buffalo Bills ===
Ojomo was signed to the Bills' practice squad on September 24, 2013.

=== Tennessee Titans ===
On December 11, 2013, Ojomo signed with the Tennessee Titans practice squad. He was waived on April 7, 2014, two weeks after he was arrested for soliciting a prostitute in Miami.

=== Los Angeles KISS ===
Ojomo was assigned to the Los Angeles KISS of the Arena Football League on May 22, 2014.

=== Dallas Cowboys ===
Ojomo signed with the Dallas Cowboys on August 1, 2014. The Cowboys waived Ojomo on August 26, 2014.

=== Hamilton Tiger-Cats ===
Ojomo was signed by the Hamilton Tiger-Cats of the Canadian Football League on September 17, 2014 and was assigned to the team's practice roster.
