= Corey Lemonier =

American football player (born 1991)

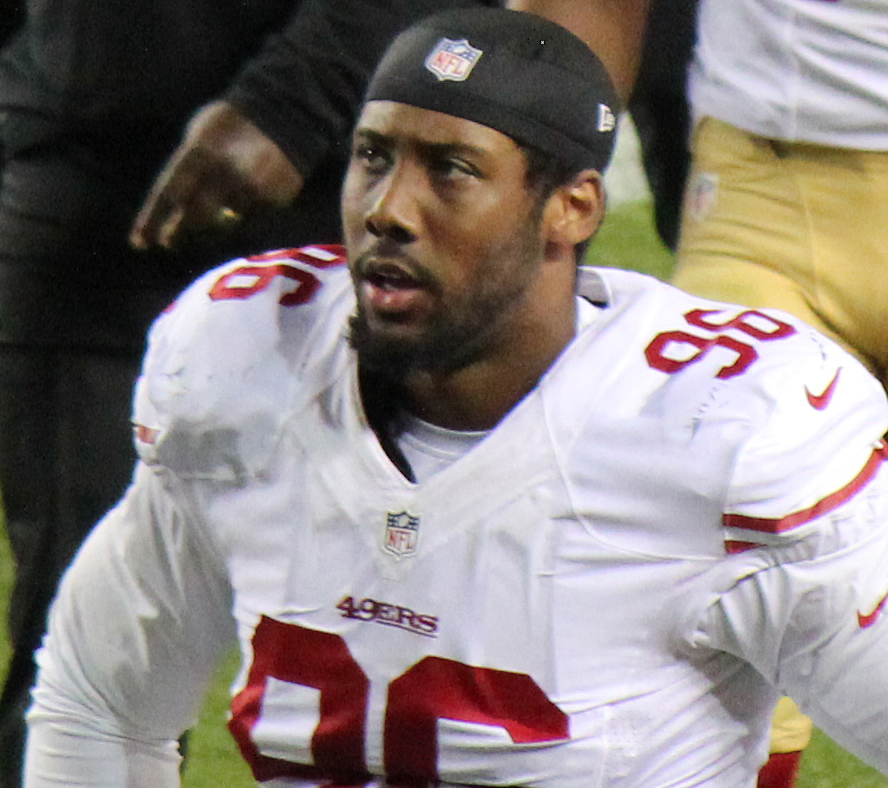
- Lemonier with the San Francisco 49ers in 2015

No. 96, 52, 44
- Position: Linebacker

Personal information
- Born: November 19, 1991 (age 34); Hialeah, Florida, U.S.
- Listed height: 6 ft 4 in (1.93 m)
- Listed weight: 255 lb (116 kg)

Career information
- High school: Hialeah
- College: Auburn
- NFL draft: 2013: 3rd round, 88th overall pick

Career history
- San Francisco 49ers (2013–2015); Cleveland Browns (2016); Detroit Lions (2016); New York Jets (2016)

Awards and highlights
- BCS national champion (2011); First-team All-SEC (2011); Second-team All-SEC (2012)

Career NFL statistics
- Total tackles: 46
- Sacks: 3
- Forced fumbles: 2
- Fumble recoveries: 1
- Stats at Pro Football Reference

Corey Lemonier (/lɛmɒnjeɪ/; born November 19, 1991) is an American former professional football player who was a linebacker in the National Football League (NFL). He was selected by the San Francisco 49ers in the third round of the 2013 NFL draft. He played college football for the Auburn Tigers.

== Early life ==
Lemonier was born in Hialeah, Florida to Henry and Francoise Lemonier, who are hardworking, Haitian immigrants. He attended Hialeah High School, and played for the Hialeah Thoroughbreds high school football team. He recorded 50 tackles and 10 sacks as a junior, and played in the 2010 Under Armour All-America Game.

Considered a four-star recruit by Rivals.com, he was ranked the 3rd best weakside defensive end in the nation. He accepted a scholarship to Auburn over offers from LSU, Florida State, and Tennessee.

== College career ==
Lemonier enrolled in Auburn University, where he played for the Auburn Tigers football team from 2010 to 2012. As a freshman in 2010, he started one of 14 games, recording 17 tackles and two quarterback sacks. He had three tackles in the tigers' victory in the 2011 BCS National Championship Game. As a sophomore in 2011, he was a first-team All-SEC selection after recording 47 tackles and 9.5 sacks. In his junior season in 2012, he recorded 34 tackles and 5.5 sacks in 12 games. He decided to forgo his senior season at Auburn and entered the 2013 NFL draft.

== Professional career ==
=== San Francisco 49ers ===
The San Francisco 49ers picked Lemonier in the third round, with the 88th overall pick, of the 2013 NFL draft. In his rookie season, he recorded his first sack and safety against the Arizona Cardinals on quarterback Carson Palmer.

On September 3, 2016, he was released by the 49ers.

=== Cleveland Browns ===
On September 4, 2016, Lemonier was claimed off waivers by the Cleveland Browns. On December 14, 2016, Lemonier was waived by the Browns.

=== Detroit Lions ===
Lemonier was claimed off waivers by the Lions on December 15, 2016. He was released by the team on December 23, 2016.

=== New York Jets ===
Lemonier was claimed off waivers by the Jets on December 26, 2016. In his first game with the Jets, he recorded a sack and forced fumble against the Bills.

On March 9, 2017, Lemonier re-signed with the Jets. He was released on September 1, 2017.
