= Sean Denison =

Canadian professional basketball player

Free agent
- Position: Power forward

Personal information
- Born: August 26, 1985 (age 41) Trail, British Columbia
- Listed height: 6 ft 11 in (2.11 m)
- Listed weight: 245 lb (111 kg)

Career information
- High school: L V Rogers (Nelson, British Columbia)
- College: Santa Clara (2003–2007)
- NBA draft: 2007: undrafted
- Playing career: 2007–present

Career history
- 2007–2010: Tofaş S.K.
- 2010–2011: Eisbären Bremerhaven
- 2011–2012: Spartak Primorye
- 2012–2013: Ataman Rostov
- 2013–2014: CSM Oradea
- 2014–2015: Polski Cukier Toruń
- 2015–2016: SOCAR Petkim
- 2016–2019: CSM Oradea

Career highlights
- WCC co-Player of the Year (2007); First-team All-WCC (2007)

Sean Morgan Denison (born August 26, 1985) is a Canadian professional basketball player. He ended up in seventh place with the Canada national men's basketball team at the 2007 Pan American Games in Rio de Janeiro, Brazil. A physics student at the Santa Clara University he played with the national development team at the 2004 Tournament of the Americas where Canada finished fourth.
