= 2014–15 Euroleague Regular Season Group C =

Standings and Results for Group C of the Regular Season phase of the 2014–15 Euroleague basketball tournament.

== Standings ==
Pos	Team	Pld	W	L	PF	PA	PD	FCB	FBU	PAN	EA7	BMU	PGE
1	(Spain) FC Barcelona (A)	10	9	1	861	738	+123		89–91	78–69	84–80	83–81	86–67
2	(Turkey) Fenerbahçe Ülker (A)	10	8	2	843	787	+56	78–80		84–62	77–74	87–81	89–74
3	(Greece) Panathinaikos (A)	10	5 (Note: Tiebreaker: 1–1 (+25))	5	768	743	+25	67–80	91–73		90–63	87–72	84–77
4	(Italy) EA7 Milano (A)	10	5 (Note: Tiebreaker: 1–1 (–25))	5	775	795	−20	63–78	74–80	66–64		83–81	90–71
5	(Germany) Bayern Munich (E)	10	2	8	806	866	−60	77–99	86–93	81–75	74–81		95–89
6	(Poland) PGE Turów (E)	10	1	9	773	897	−124	65–104	76–91	69–79	96–101	89–78	

(A) Advance to Top 16; (E) Enter 2014–15 Eurocup Basketball last 32 round

== Fixtures and results ==
All times given below are in Central European Time.

=== Game 1 ===
17 October 2014
20:30

Report

Panathinaikos (Greece)	84–77	(Poland) PGE Turów
Scoring by quarter: 18–14, 24–21, 26–24, 16–18
Pts: Slaughter, Pappas 16; Rebs: Batista 7 Asts: Diamantidis 4		Pts: Collins 23; Rebs: Collins 9 Asts: Collins 5

O.A.C.A., Athens
Attendance: 8,165
Referees: Milivoje Jovcic (SRB), Damir Javor (SLO), David Romano (ISR)

17 October 2014
21:00

Report

Fenerbahçe Ülker (Turkey)	77–74	(Italy) EA7 Milano
Scoring by quarter: 26–15, 15–28, 16-15, 20-16
Pts: Goudelock 19; Rebs: Veselý 9 Asts: Goudelock, Bogdanović 4		Pts: Gentile 15; Rebs: Samuels 9 Asts: Hackett 4

Ülker Sports Arena, Istanbul
Attendance: 10,143
Referees: Christos Christodoulou (GRE), Olegs Latisevs (LAT), Emilio Perez Pizarro (ESP)

17 October 2014
21:30

Report

FC Barcelona (Spain)	83–81	(Germany) Bayern Munich
Scoring by quarter: 19–19, 25-24, 18-16, 21-22
Pts: Doellman 16; Rebs: Tomić 10; Asts: Navarro 8		Pts: Đedović 19; Rebs: Bryant 11; Asts: Đedović, Bryant 4

Palau Blaugrana, Barcelona
Attendance: 6,631
Referees: Tolga Sahin (ITA), Eddie Viator (FRA), Petros Papapetrou (GRE)

=== Game 2 ===
23 October 2014
20:45

Report

Bayern Munich (Germany)	81–75	(Greece) Panathinaikos
Scoring by quarter: 17–16, 15-19, 25–24, 24-16
Pts: Savanović 20; Rebs: Bryant 9 Asts: Micić 4		Pts: Batista 18; Rebs: Batista 7 Asts: Diamantidis 7

Audi Dome, Munich
Attendance: 5,680
Referees: Jose Ramon Garcia Ortiz (ESP), Carmelo Paternico (ITA), Sergiy Zashchuk (UKR)

23 October 2014
21:00

Report

PGE Turów (Poland)	76–91	(Turkey) Fenerbahçe Ülker
Scoring by quarter: 15-30, 25-20, 20-19, 16-22
Pts: Kulig 23; Rebs: Kulig 8 Asts: Jaramaz 4		Pts: Goudelock 27; Rebs: Savaş 7 Asts: Bjelica, Preldžić 4

Regionalne Centrum Sportowe, Lubin
Attendance: 1,773
Referees: Fernando Rocha (POR), Eddie Viator (FRA), Sergiy Chebyshev (UKR)

23 October 2014
21:00

Report

EA7 Milano (Italy)	63–78	(Spain) FC Barcelona
Scoring by quarter: 17-20, 15-25, 18-18, 13-25
Pts: Hackett 15; Rebs: Gentile, James, Samuels 7 Asts: Gentile 8		Pts: Abrines 21; Rebs: Pleiß 6 Asts: Satoranský 6

Mediolanum Forum, Milan
Attendance: 8,977
Referees: Ilija Belosevic (SRB), Borys Ryzhyk (UKR), Jakub Zamojski (POL)

=== Game 3 ===
30 October 2014
20:30

Report

Panathinaikos (Greece)	91–73	(Turkey) Fenerbahçe Ülker
Scoring by quarter: 31-19, 28-17, 23-21, 9-16
Pts: Slaughter 23; Rebs: Fotsis 6 Asts: Diamantidis 10		Pts: Bjelica 16; Rebs: Veselý 8 Asts: Preldžić 5

O.A.C.A., Athens
Attendance: 14,480
Referees: Miguel Perez Perez (ESP), Borys Ryshyk (UKR), Tomasz Teawicki (POL)

31 October 2014
20:15

Report

Bayern Munich (Germany)	74–81	(Italy) EA7 Milano
Scoring by quarter: 21-25, 22-18, 16-13, 15-25
Pts: Schaffartzik 15; Rebs: Bryant 10; Asts: Gavel 4		Pts: Ragland, Hackett 16; Rebs: Moss 5 Asts: Hackett 6

Audi Dome, Munich
Attendance: 6,037
Referees: Dani Hierrezuelo (ESP), Elias Koromilas (GRE), Carlos Reruga (ESP)

31 October 2014
20:45

Report

FC Barcelona (Spain)	86–67	(Poland) PGE Turów
Scoring by quarter: 23-21, 26-16, 23-18, 14-12
Pts: Doellman 20; Rebs: Tomić 9 Asts: Oleson, Huertas 5		Pts: Kulig 19; Rebs: Kulig, Wright 5 Asts: Collins, Dylewicz 4

Palau Blaugrana, Barcelona
Attendance: 6,306
Referees: Roberto Chiari (ITA), Milija Vojinovic (SRB), Marko Juras (SRB)

=== Game 4 ===
6 November 2014
19:00

Report

PGE Turów (Poland)	89–78	(Germany) Bayern Munich
Scoring by quarter: 17-22, 25-17, 28-20, 19-19
Pts: Kulig 22; Rebs: Kulig, Wright 6 Asts: Collins 7		Pts: Đedović 16; Rebs: Bryant 10; Asts: Schaffartzik 4

Regionalne Centrum Sportowe, Lubin
Attendance: 2,242
Referees: Borys Ryzhyk (UKR), Juan Carlos Garcia Gonzales (ESP), Gentian Cici (ALB)

6 November 2014
20:45

Report

Fenerbahçe Ülker (Turkey)	78–80	(Spain) FC Barcelona
Scoring by quarter: 21-19, 20-22, 19-23, 18-16
Pts: Žorić 18; Rebs: Žorić 10; Asts: Bjelica 4		Pts: Oleson 16; Rebs: Lampe 8 Asts: Huertas 6

Ülker Sports Arena, Istanbul
Attendance: 10,785
Referees: Luigi Lamonica(ITA), Matej Boltauzer(SLO), Elias Koromilas(GRE)

7 November 2014
20:45

Report

Panathinaikos (Greece)	90–63	(Italy) EA7 Milano
Scoring by quarter: 23-13, 21-17, 27-13, 19-20
Pts: Batista 15; Rebs: Diamantidis 7 Asts: Diamantidis 8		Pts: Samuels 18; Rebs: Melli, James, Samuels 3 Asts: Ragland 7

O.A.C.A., Athens
Attendance: 10,580
Referees: Sasa Pukl (SLO), Robert Lottermoser (GER), Milija Vojinovic (SRB)

=== Game 5 ===
13 November 2014
20:15

Report

Bayern Munich (Germany)	86–93	(Turkey) Fenerbahçe Ülker
Scoring by quarter: 22-19, 22-31, 16-19, 26-24
Pts: Đedović, Micić 16; Rebs: Bryant, Micić, Savanović 5 Asts: Schaffartzik 8		Pts: Goudelock 34; Rebs: Bjelica 7 Asts: Bogdanović 7

Audi Dome, Munich
Attendance: 6,688
Referees: Sasa Pukl (SLO), Emilio Perez Pizarro (ESP), Oscar Perea (ESP)

13 November 2014
20:45

Report

EA7 Milano (Italy)	90–71	(Poland) PGE Turów
Scoring by quarter: 26-16, 14-22, 18-19, 32-14
Pts: Ragland 20; Rebs: Samuels, Moss 8 Asts: Hackett 9		Pts: Taylor 15; Rebs: Kulig 6 Asts: Dylewicz, Taylor 3

Mediolanum Forum, Milan
Attendance: 7,210
Referees: Srdan Dozai (CRO), Carlos Cortes (ESP), Tomislav Hordov (CRO)

14 November 2014
21:00

Report

FC Barcelona (Spain)	78–69	(Greece) Panathinaikos
Scoring by quarter: 18-18, 29-20, 17-18, 14-13
Pts: Tomić 16; Rebs: Tomić 10; Asts: Huertas 5		Pts: Batista 14; Rebs: Batista 8 Asts: Diamantidis 4

Palau Blaugrana, Barcelona
Attendance: 6,605
Referees: Milivoje Jovcic (SRB), Olegs Latisevs (LAT), Nicola Maestre (FRA)

=== Game 6 ===
20 November 2014
20:15

Report

Bayern Munich (Germany)	77–99	(Spain) FC Barcelona
Scoring by quarter: 17-22, 22-38, 21-21, 17-18
Pts: Đedović 14; Rebs: Bryant, Štimac 7 Asts: McCalebb, Đedović 5		Pts: Huertas, Navarro, Nachbar 15; Rebs: Tomić 6 Asts: Huertas 6

Audi Dome, Munich
Attendance: 6,683
Referees: Christos Christodoulou (GRE), Rustu Nuran (TUR), Piotr Pastusiak (POL)

20 November 2014
20:45

Report

PGE Turów (Poland)	69–79	(Greece) Panathinaikos
Scoring by quarter: 22-25, 11-19, 18-17, 18-18
Pts: Taylor, Wright 13; Rebs: Nikolić 5 Asts: Taylor 7		Pts: Mavrokefalidis 21; Rebs: Janković 7 Asts: Slaughter, Diamantidis 3

Regionalne Centrum Sportowe, Lubin
Attendance: 1,803
Referees: Tolga Sahin (ITA), Sinisa Herceg (CRO), Petri Mantyla (FIN)

20 November 2014
21:00

Report

EA7 Milano (Italy)	74–80	(Turkey) Fenerbahçe Ülker
Scoring by quarter: 23-21, 14-23, 12-18, 25-18
Pts: Brooks 17; Rebs: Hackett 10; Asts: Ragland 6		Pts: Hickman 14; Rebs: Bjelica 8 Asts: Goudelock 5

PalaDesio, Desio
Attendance: 6,344
Referees: Fernando Rocha (POR), Sreten Radovic (CRO), Sergiy Zashchuk (UKR)

=== Game 7 ===
27 November 2014
19:15

Report

Fenerbahçe Ülker (Turkey)	89–74	(Poland) PGE Turów
Scoring by quarter: 26-12, 22-24, 17-17, 24-21
Pts: Goudelock 21; Rebs: Bjelica 10; Asts: Bogdanović, Hickman 5		Pts: Moldoveanu 16; Rebs: Kulig 10; Asts: Taylor 9

Ülker Sports Arena, Istanbul
Attendance: 8,559
Referees: Dani Hierrezuelo (ESP), Petar Obradovic (BIH), Milos Koljensic (MNE)

28 November 2014
20:00

Report

Panathinaikos (Greece)	87–72	(Germany) Bayern Munich
Scoring by quarter: 18-12, 26-21, 21-18, 22-21
Pts: Slaughter 17; Rebs: Gist 6 Asts: Diamantidis 5		Pts: McCalebb 15; Rebs: Bryant 9 Asts: Schaffartzik, Benzing 4

O.A.C.A., Athens
Attendance: 11,781
Referees: Luigi Lamonica (ITA), Seffi Shemmesh (ISR), Benjamin Jimenez (ESP)

28 November 2014
20:45

Report

FC Barcelona (Spain)	84–80	(Italy) EA7 Milano
Scoring by quarter: 16-19, 20-23, 21-14, 27-24
Pts: Tomić 18; Rebs: Tomić 7 Asts: Oleson 4		Pts: Hackett 21; Rebs: James 6 Asts: Hackett 5

Palau Blaugrana, Barcelona
Attendance: 7,121
Referees: Spiros Gkontas (GRE), Damir Javor (SLO), Sasa Maricic (SRB)

=== Game 8 ===
3 December 2014
19:00

Report

EA7 Milano (Italy)	83–81	(Germany) Bayern Munich
Scoring by quarter: 20-19, 17-19, 22-22, 24-21
Pts: Hackett 25; Rebs: Melli, Samuels, Moss 6 Asts: Gentile 4		Pts: Schaffartzik 15; Rebs: Štimac 8 Asts: Schaffartzik 5

Mediolanum Forum, Milan
Attendance: 10,169
Referees: Miguel Perez Perez (ESP), Panagiotis Anastopoulos (GRE), Marek Cmikiewicz (POL)

4 December 2014
19:00

Report

Fenerbahçe Ülker (Turkey)	84–62	(Greece) Panathinaikos
Scoring by quarter: 18-18, 18-14, 31-16, 17-14
Pts: Goudelock 18; Rebs: Bogdanović 8 Asts: Bogdanović 4		Pts: Slaughter 20; Rebs: Gist, Fotsis 4 Asts: Gist 5

Ülker Sports Arena, Istanbul
Attendance: 12,853
Referees: Robert Lottermoser(GER), Antonio Conde(ESP), Tomas Jasevicius(LTU)

5 December 2014
20:30

Report

PGE Turów (Poland)	65–104	(Spain) FC Barcelona
Scoring by quarter: 16-20, 11-23, 16-36, 22-25
Pts: Taylor 17; Rebs: Dylewicz 6 Asts: Chylinski 3		Pts: Nachbar 17; Rebs: Pleiß 6 Asts: Satoranský 6

Regionalne Centrum Sportowe, Lubin
Attendance: 3,217
Referees: Anastasios Piloidis (GRE), Robert Vyklicky (CZE), Moritz Reiter (GER)

=== Game 9 ===
11 December 2014
20:15

Report

Bayern Munich (Germany)	95–89	(Poland) PGE Turów
Scoring by quarter: 16-22, 22-24, 25-26, 32-17
Pts: Savanović 31; Rebs: Bryant 7 Asts: Gavel 5		Pts: Jaramaz 16; Rebs: Dylewicz 6 Asts: Jaramaz 4

Audi Dome, Munich
Attendance: 5,047
Referees: Elias Koromilas (GRE), Vicente Bulto (ESP), Saverio Lanzarini (ITA)

11 December 2014
20:45

Report

EA7 Milano (Italy)	66–64	(Greece) Panathinaikos
Scoring by quarter: 18-11, 14-17, 20-23, 14-13
Pts: Hackett 21; Rebs: Hackett 4 Asts: Hackett 4		Pts: Slaughter 17; Rebs: Gist 10; Asts: Diamantidis 11

PalaDesio, Desio
Attendance: 6,870
Referees: Juan Carlos Garcia Gonzalez (ESP), Emilio Perez Pizarro (ESP), Marcin Kowalski (POL)

11 December 2014
20:45

Report

FC Barcelona (Spain)	89–91 (OT)	(Turkey) Fenerbahçe Ülker
Scoring by quarter: 23-25, 14-17, 24-17, 18-20, Overtime: 10-12
Pts: Huertas 25; Rebs: Doellman 6 Asts: Huertas 5		Pts: Bogdanović 23; Rebs: Veselý 10; Asts: Sipahi 5

Palau Blaugrana, Barcelona
Attendance: 6,619
Referees: Ilija Belosevic (SRB), Jakub Zamojski (POL), Carmelo Paternico (ITA)

=== Game 10 ===
18 December 2014
20:45

Report

PGE Turów (Poland)	96–101	(Italy) EA7 Milano
Scoring by quarter: 17-22, 22-25, 27-25, 30-29
Pts: Kuling 23; Rebs: Kuling 8 Asts: Collins, Taylor 5		Pts: Kleiza 29; Rebs: Kleiza 6 Asts: Hackett 9

Regionalne Centrum Sportowe, Lubin
Attendance: 709
Referees: Recep Ankarali (TUR), Nicola Maestre (ITA), Tomas Jasevicius (LTU)

18 December 2014
19:00

Report

Fenerbahçe Ülker (Turkey)	87–81	(Germany) Bayern Munich
Scoring by quarter: 21-16, 21-17, 22-23, 23-25
Pts: Bogdanović 16; Rebs: Bjelica 6 Asts: Bogdanović 4		Pts: Đedović 19; Rebs: Štimac 8 Asts: McCalebb 5

Ülker Sports Arena, Istanbul
Attendance: 11,647
Referees: Grzegorz Ziemblicki (POL), Boris Sulga (UKR), Ingus Baumanis (LAT)

19 December 2014
21:00

Report

Panathinaikos (Greece)	67–80	(Spain) FC Barcelona
Scoring by quarter: 10-21, 13-19, 24-20, 20-20
Pts: Fotsis 14; Rebs: Fotsis 8 Asts: Nelson 5		Pts: Huertas 17; Rebs: Lampe 10; Asts: Huertas 9

O.A.C.A., Athens
Attendance: 13,224
Referees: Fernando Rocha (POR), Tolga Sahin (ITA), Eddie Viator (FRA)

== Statistics ==
	(Germany) Bayern Munich	(Italy) EA7 Milano	(Spain) FC Barcelona	(Turkey) Fenerbahçe Ülker	(Greece) Panathinaikos	(Poland) PGE Turów
PPG	(Serbia) Duško Savanović (13.1)	(Italy) Daniel Hackett (13.2)	(United States) Justin Doellman & (Croatia) Ante Tomić (10.4)	(United States) Andrew Goudelock (16.9)	(United States) A. J. Slaughter (12.7)	(Poland) Damian Kulig (15.2)
RPG	(United States) John Bryant (7.7)	(Jamaica) Samardo Samuels (5.8)	(Croatia) Ante Tomić (6.8)	(Czech Republic) Jan Veselý (5.9)	(United States) James Gist (5.3)	(Poland) Damian Kulig (5.5)
APG	(North Macedonia) Bo McCalebb (3.6)	(Italy) Daniel Hackett (4.8)	(Brazil) Marcelinho Huertas (4.8)	(Serbia) Bogdan Bogdanović (3.4)	(Greece) Dimitris Diamantidis (5.9)	(United States) Mardy Collins (3.9)

Updated to game played on 19 December 2014
