= Hialeah Senior High School =

Public high school in Florida

Location
- 251 E. 47th Street; Hialeah, Florida; United States; 25.86569°N 80.27581°W

Information
- Type: Public
- Motto: To Seek, To Find, To Share
- Established: September 1954
- School district: Miami-Dade County Public Schools
- Principal: Ignacio Rodriguez
- Staff: 88.00 (FTE)
- Grades: 9–12
- Enrollment: 1,212 (2025–2026)
- Student to teacher ratio: 19.56
- Colors: Scarlet; Royal Blue; White
- Mascot: T-bred
- Team name: Thoroughbreds
- Newspaper: The Record
- Yearbook: Hiways
- School grade: B (as of 2025-2026)
- School hours: 7:20 AM to 2:20 PM
- Website: hialeahhigh.org

Hialeah Senior High School is a public high school located at 251 E 47th Street in Hialeah, Florida, United States.

== History ==
Hialeah Senior High School opened in September 1954.

In April 2012, Alberto M. Carvalho, the superintendent of Miami-Dade County Public Schools, awarded Natalie Antunez the $250,000 Leonore Annenberg Scholarship Fund.

== Academics ==
The state's accountability program grades a school by a complex formula that looks at both current scores and annual improvement on the Reading, Math, Writing and Science FCATs.

School Year	Grade
1998-99	C
1999-00	C
2000-01	D
2001-02	C
2002-03	D
2003-04	D
2004-05	C
2005-06	C
2006-07	F
2007-08	C
2008-09	D
2009-10	C
2010-11	C
2011-12	B
2012-13	B
2013-14	C
2014-15	C
2015-16	C
2016-17	C
2017-18	C
2018-19	C
2021-22	C
2022-23	C
2023-24	B
2024-25	B
2025-26	B

== Demographics ==
Hialeah Senior High School is 96% Hispanic, 3% Black, and 1% White non-Hispanic. The school has a high proportion of foreign-born students, with 59.8% students born outside of the United States (54.1% Cuba, 4.0% Nicaragua, 2.0% Honduras).

== Athletics ==
In 2013, Alin Edouard, the quarterback of the school's football team, decommitted from the University of Miami Hurricanes.

=== Accolades ===
- Baseball: won the State Title in 1969, 2001, and 2002

== Extracurricular accomplishments ==
=== Band ===
- 1964: the Marching Thoroughbred Band played in the Florida Pavilion at the New York World's Fair
- 1967-68: one of the featured bands at Super Bowl 2 (Raiders vs. Packers) halftime show
- 1968-69: featured band at University of Florida homecoming halftime show; escorted Queen's Float in Orange Bowl Parade; featured band at Super Bowl 3 (Colts vs Jets) halftime show; a top ten national marching band in the Disney Band Competition
- 2011: Florida Marching Band Competition 1A State Champions
- 2014: Florida Marching Band Competition 1A State Champions
- 2015: Florida Marching Band Competition 1A State Champions
- 2022: Florida Marching Band Competition 1A State Champions

=== Chorus ===
The TBS (T-Bred Singers) have placed first in The Miracle Mile Caroling Competition's show choir category for the past 30 years, since it began.

== Notable alumni ==
- Harry Wayne Casey, singer/songwriter/producer, founder of KC and the Sunshine Band
- Randy Coffield, NFL linebacker
- Nestor Cortes Jr., professional baseball pitcher for the Milwaukee Brewers, pitched in the 2022 MLB All Star Game
- Paris Cotton, CFL running back
- Bucky Dent, professional baseball player for the New York Yankees, 1978 World Series MVP
- George Enright, professional baseball player for the Chicago White Sox
- David Freeman, Olympian, competed in the 1500 meters at the 2008 Beijing Olympics
- Gio González, baseball player for the Chicago White Sox
- Ted Hendricks, All American with Miami Hurricanes [Pro Football Hall of Fame]] linebacker for the Baltimore Colts, Green Bay Packers, and Oakland/LA Raiders, and four-time Super Bowl champion
- Charlie Hough, professional baseball player
- Randy Johnson, professional baseball player for the Chicago White Sox and Minnesota Twins
- Ross Jones, professional baseball player for the New York Mets, Seattle Mariners, and Kansas City Royals
- Shawn Jones (born 1992), basketball player for Hapoel Haifa of the Israeli Basketball Premier League.
- Corey Lemonier, NFL linebacker for the San Francisco 49ers
- Corey Liuget, NFL lineman for the San Diego Chargers, selected in the 1st round of the 2011 NFL draft
- Kiel Martin, played J. D. LaRue on Hill Street Blues
- Adewale Ojomo, NFL defensive end for the New York Giants
- George Ortuzar, actor/comedian/television host
- Henry Polic II, stage, screen, and voice actor
- Roell Preston, professional football player
- Jon Secada, Grammy-winning singer/songwriter
- Alan Wiggins, professional baseball player
- Pedro Zamora, HIV/AIDS educator; The Real World: San Francisco television personality
