= Polski Cukier =

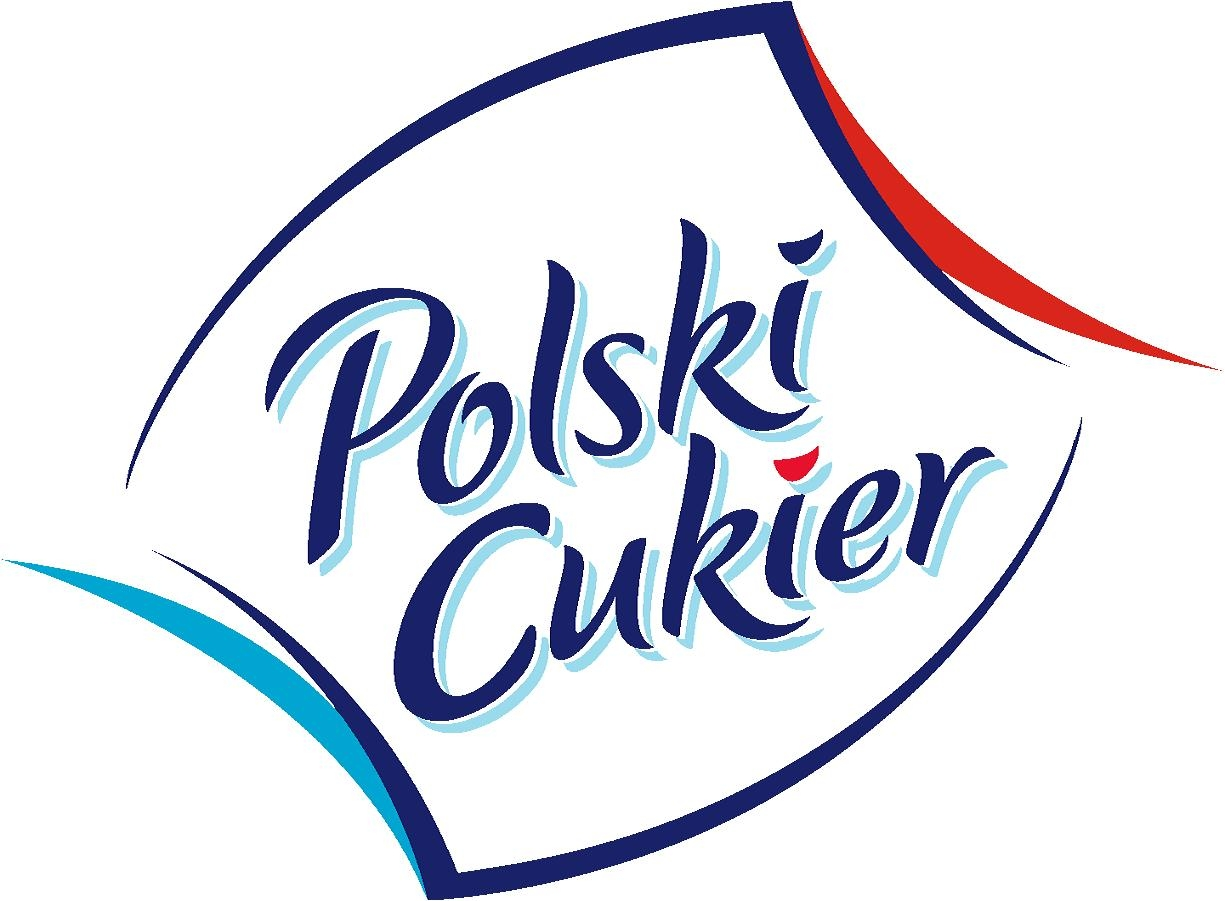
- Company type: Cooperative
- Industry: Food industry
- Founded: 2002
- Headquarters: Toruń, Poland
- Area served: Poland
- Key people: Sandra Malinowska
- Products: Sugar
- Revenue: 990 677 758 zł
- Net income: 7,900,000 (2018)
- Number of employees: 2,399 (2018)
- Website: www.polski-cukier.pl

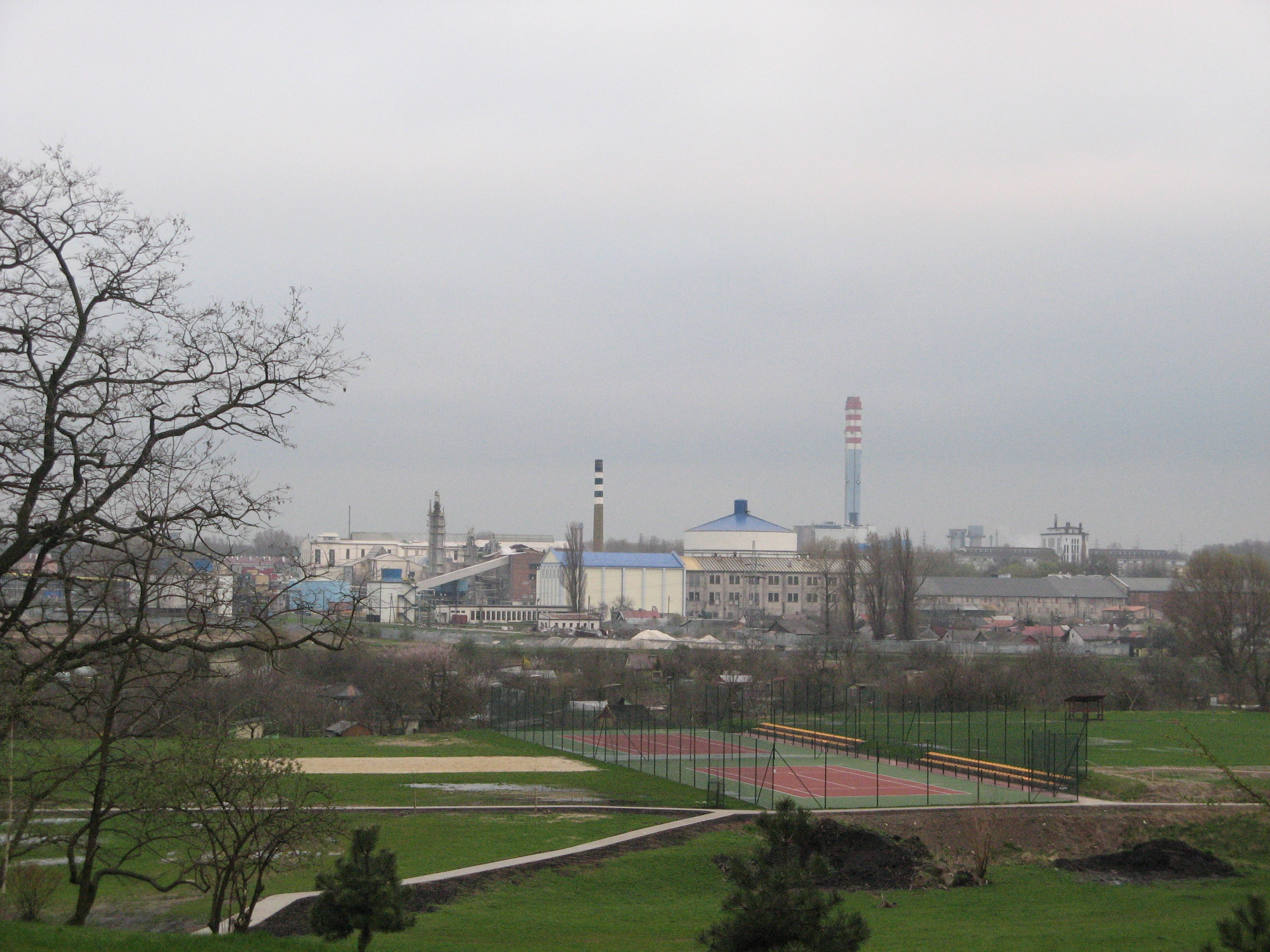
The Sugar Refinery in Lublin.

Polski Cukier (actually: Krajowa Spółka Cukrowa Spółka Akcyjna, abbreviated to KSC Polski Cukier S.A., literally: Polish Sugar) - founded in August 2002 after the consortium with the headquarters in Toruń. Krajowa Spółka Cukrowa (KSC) had taken over many companies around the country. The cooperative belongs to the State Treasury.

== Structure ==
In 2002 the company seized the following sugar refineries:

1. Borowiczki Sugar Refinery (closed)
2. Brześć Kujawski Sugar Refinery (closed)
3. Częstocice Sugar Refinery
4. Dobrzelin Sugar Refinery
5. Gryfice Sugar Refinery
6. Janikowo Sugar Refinery
7. Klemensów Sugar Refinery (closed)
8. Stargard Sugar Refinery
9. Siennica Nadolna Sugar Refinery
10. Kruszwica Sugar Refinery
11. Lublin Sugar Refinery (closed)
12. Łapy Sugar Refinery (closed)
13. Malbork Sugar Refinery
14. Mała Wieś Sugar Refinery (closed in the year 2006)
15. Nakło Sugar Refinery
16. Nowy Staw Sugar Refinery (closed on 1 June 2007)
17. Opole Lubelskie Sugar Refinery (closed)
18. Ostrowy Sugar Refinery
19. Przeworsk Sugar Refinery
20. Pruszcz Gdański Sugar Refinery (closed)
21. Rejowie Sugar Refinery
22. Sokołów Podlaski Sugar Refinery
23. Szczecin Sugar Refinery
24. Tuczno Sugar Refinery (closed)
25. Werbkowice Sugar Refinery
26. Wożuczyn Sugar Refinery
27. Żnin Sugar Refinery (closed)

The cooperative had been the main owner of the Leśmierz Sugar Refinery and smaller sugar refineries in : Baborów, Polska Cerekiew, Chełmża, Chybie, Jawor, Krasiniec, Lewin Brzeski (Wróblin Sugar Refinery), Łagiewniki, Małoszyn, Mełno, Opalenica, Ostrowite, Otmuchów, Pastuchów, Pustków, Lower Silesian Voivodeship, Racibórz, Ropczyce, Strzelin, Strzyżów, Szamotuły, Świdnica, Wieluń, Włostów, Wrocław and Włostów.
