= Dejan Mihevc =

Slovenian basketball coach

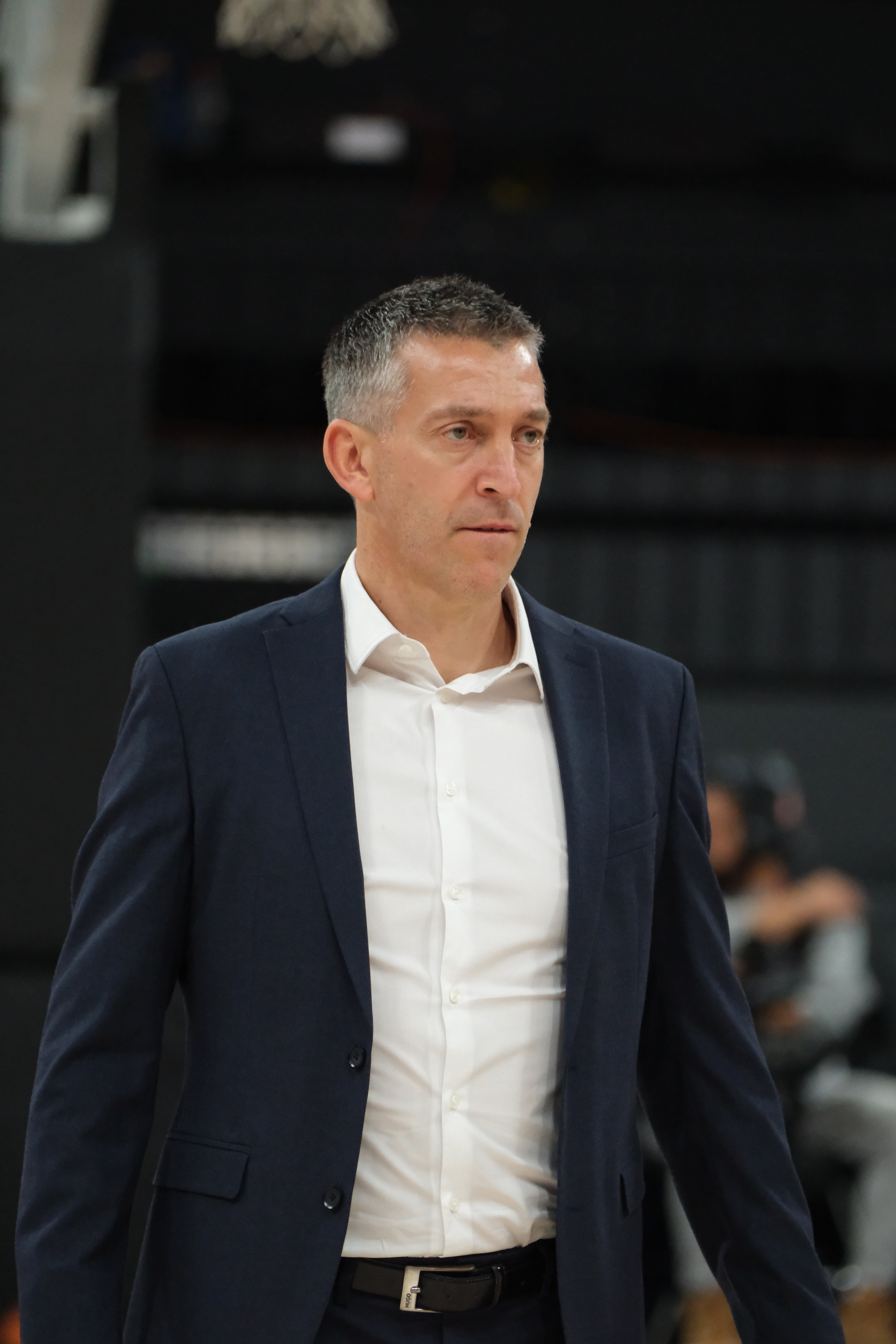
- Mihevc in 2025

Würzburg Baskets
- Position: Assistant coach
- League: Basketball Bundesliga

Personal information
- Born: May 14, 1978 (age 48) SFR Yugoslavia
- Coaching career: 1998–present

Career history

Coaching
- 2001–2006: Šentjur (assistant)
- 2008–2010: Slovenia U18
- 2011–2012: London Leopards
- 2013: Slovenia U20 (assistant)
- 2013–2014: Grosuplje
- 2014–2016: Tajfun
- 2016–2017: Krka
- 2017–2019: Polski Cukier Toruń
- 2019–2020: Anwil Włocławek
- 2020–2021: Alba Fehérvár
- 2020–present: Slovenia (assistant)
- 2022–present: Würzburg Baskets (assistant)

Dejan Mihevc (born 14 May 1978) is a Slovenian basketball coach, currently serving as an assistant to Sašo Filipovski in Würzburg Baskets of the Basketball Bundesliga, and to Aleksander Sekulić in the Slovenian national team.

== Honours ==
London Leopards

- English Basketball League Division One CHAMPION: 2011–12
- English National Cup CHAMPION: 2011–12

Tajfun Šentjur

- Slovenian First League CHAMPION: 2014–15
- Slovenian Basketball Supercup CHAMPION: 2015

Krka Novo mesto

- Slovenian Basketball Supercup CHAMPION: 2016

Twarde Pierniki Toruń

- Polish Basketball Cup CHAMPION: 2018
- Polish Basketball Supercup CHAMPION: 2018
- Polish Basketball League: Third place 2017–18, Runner-up 2018–19

Individual

- English Basketball League Division One Best Coach: 2011–12
- Slovenian basketball league Best Coach: 2014–15
- PLK Best Coach: 2017–18
