= Damian Kulig =

Polish basketball player (born 1987)

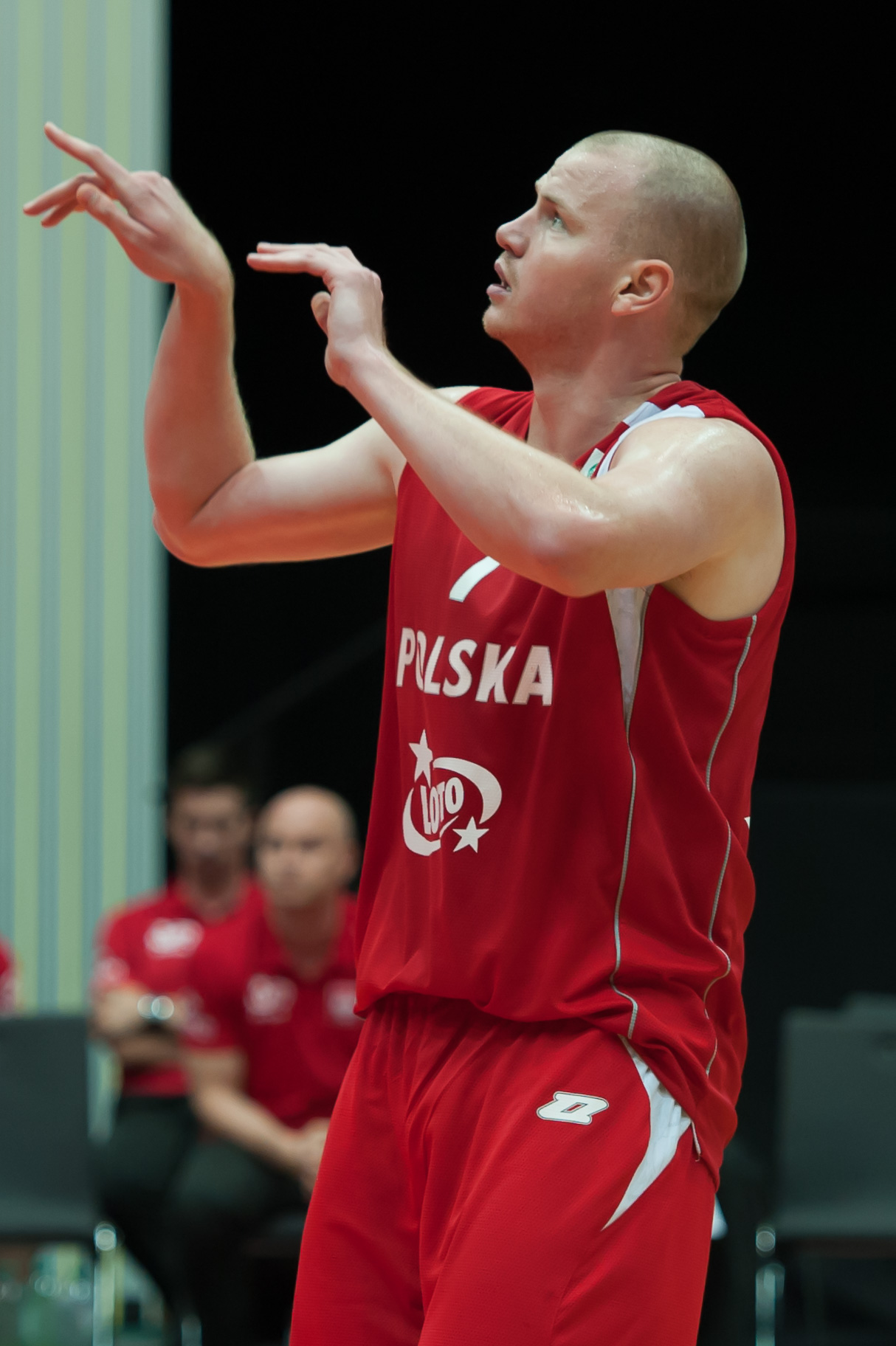
- Kulig with the Polish national team in August 2013

No. 77 – Twarde Pierniki Toruń
- Position: Power forward / center
- League: PLK

Personal information
- Born: June 23, 1987 (age 38); Piotrków Trybunalski, Poland
- Listed height: 6 ft 9 in (2.06 m)
- Listed weight: 243 lb (110 kg)

Career information
- NBA draft: 2009: undrafted
- Playing career: 2004–present

Career history
- 2004–2005: SMS Kozienice
- 2005: Mickiewicz Katowice
- 2005–2007: Piotrcovia Piotrków Trybunalski
- 2007–2009: Big Star Tychy
- 2009–2010: Starogard Gdański
- 2010–2012: PBG Poznań
- 2012–2015: Turów Zgorzelec
- 2015–2016: Trabzonspor
- 2016–2018: Banvit
- 2018–2019: İstanbul BB
- 2019–2021: Twarde Pierniki Toruń
- 2021–2025: Stal Ostrów Wielkopolski
- 2025–present: Twarde Pierniki Toruń

Career highlights
- All-PLK Team (2023); ENBL Finals MVP (2023); ENBL winner (2023); Polish Supercup winner (2022); Polish Cup winner (2022); Turkish Cup winner (2017); Polish League MVP (2015); Polish League champion (2014); All-VTB United League Second Team (2014)

Damian Kulig (born June 23, 1987) is a Polish professional basketball player for Twarde Pierniki Toruń of the Polish Basketball League (PLK). He represents the Polish national team internationally. Standing at 6 ft 9 in (2.06 m), he plays at the power forward and center positions.

== Professional career ==
On March 22, 2012, Kulig moved from Poznań to sign with the Polish team Turów Zgorzelec until the end of the 2011–12 season. In May 2012, the club extended contract with him for one more season.

In the 2014–15 season, Kulig played in the EuroLeague for the first time in his career. Over 10 games, he led his team with 15.2 points, also having 5.5 rebounds and 1.5 assists per game. However, Turów Zgorzelec was eliminated in the first phase of the competition, being last in the Group C with a 1–9 score. On April 29, 2015, Kulig won the PLK Most Valuable Player Award. Turów Zgorzelec finished the season in 2nd place of the Polish League, after a 4–2 loss to Zielona Góra in the final series.

On June 11, 2015, he signed a contract with the Turkish team Trabzonspor.

On July 8, 2016, he signed with Banvit.

Kulig signed with Twarde Pierniki Toruń on January 15, 2019. He averaged 10.1 points and 6 rebounds per game. Kulig re-signed with the team to a two-year extension on July 15, 2020.

On June 5, 2021, he signed with Stal Ostrów Wielkopolski of the Polish Basketball League (PLK).

On July 11, 2025, he signed with Twarde Pierniki Toruń of the Polish Basketball League (PLK).

== International career ==
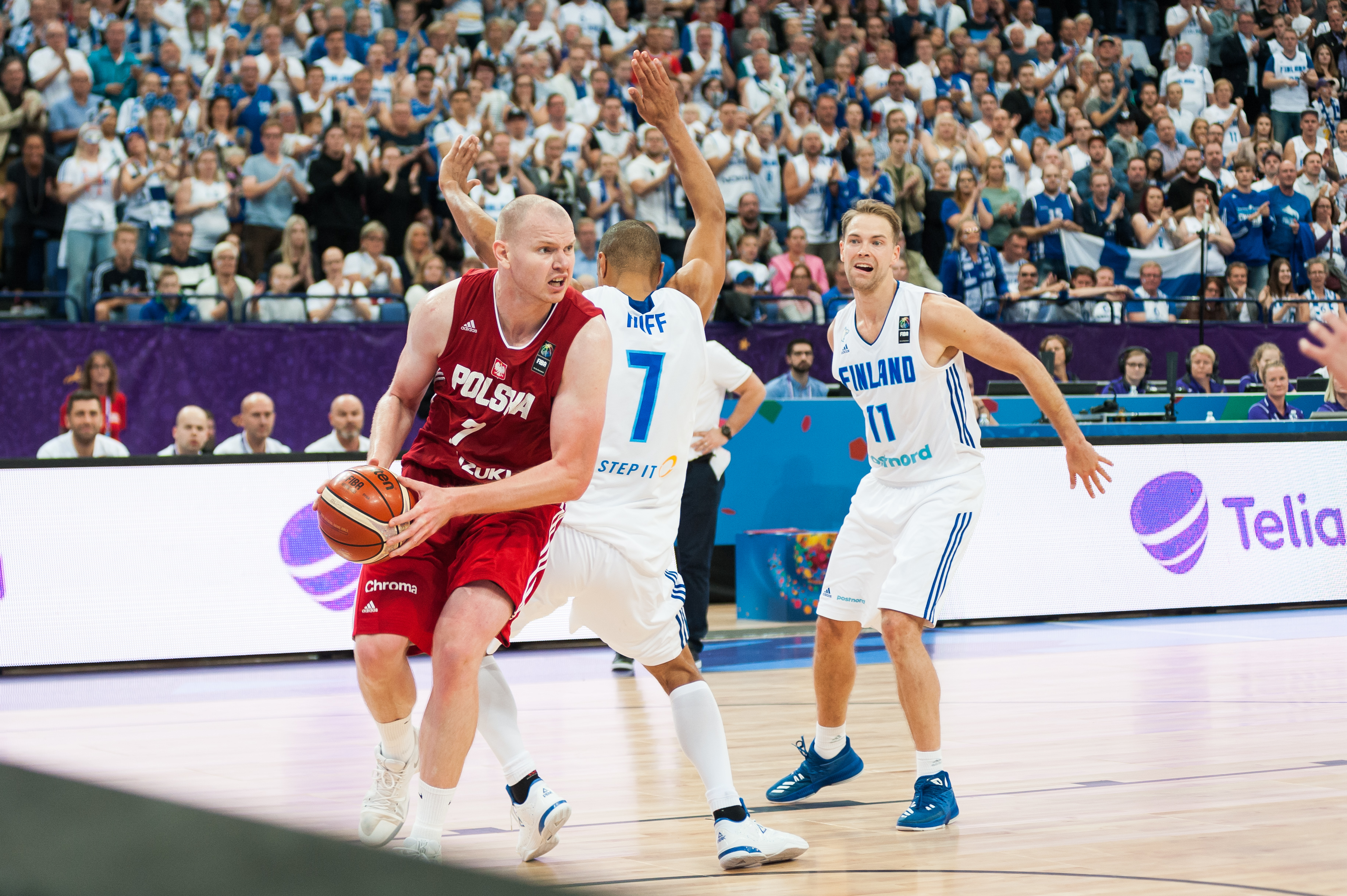
Kulig (left) during EuroBasket 2017

Kulig represented Poland at the EuroBasket 2015. Over six tournament games, he averaged 6.7 points and 5.7 rebounds on 45.2 shooting from the field.

== Career statistics ==
Legend
GP	Games played	GS	Games started	MPG	Minutes per game
FG%	Field-goal percentage	3P%	3-point field-goal percentage	FT%	Free-throw percentage
RPG	Rebounds per game	APG	Assists per game	SPG	Steals per game
BPG	Blocks per game	PPG	Points per game	PIR	Performance index rating
**Bold**	Career high

=== EuroLeague ===
Year	Team	GP	GS	MPG	FG%	3P%	FT%	RPG	APG	SPG	BPG	PPG	PIR
2014–15	Turów	10	1	25.3	.563	.472	.633	5.5	1.5	.6	1.1	15.2	14.5
Career		10	1	25.3	.563	.472	.633	5.5	1.5	.6	1.1	15.2	14.5

== Honours ==
=== Trophies ===
- Polish League (1): 2013–14

=== Individual awards ===
- PLK Most Valuable Player: 2015
- All-PLK Team: 2015
- PLK Most Improved Player: 2012
