= Mełno =

Mełno may refer to:

- Mełno, Brodnica County, Poland
- Mełno, Grudziądz County, Poland
- Mełno-Cukrownia, Poland
