= PBG Basket Poznań =

PBG Poznań
- Founded: 2006; 19 years ago
- Dissolved: 2012; 13 years ago
- Arena: Hala Arena; Hala AWF
- Capacity: 4,200; 1,200
- Location: Poznań, Poland
- Championships: 11 Polish Championships (as Lech)
Home	Away

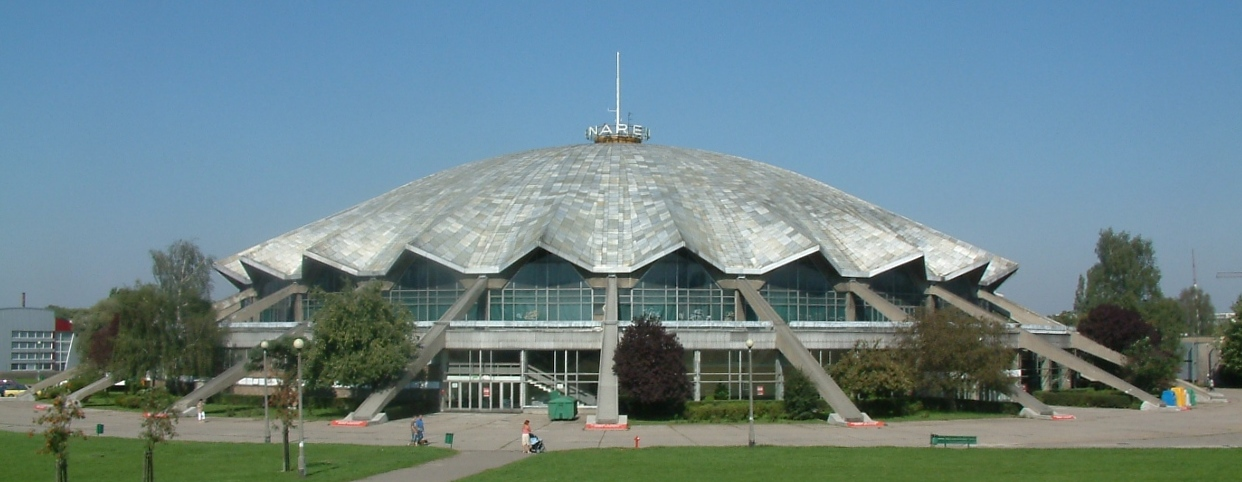
Hala Arena was the home arena of the team

PBG Basket Poznań is a former professional basketball club from Poznań, Poland. The team was founded in 2006, intending to continue the basketball legacy of Lech Poznań. PBG played in the PLK for most of its existence, but withdrew in 2012.

== Notable players ==
- (Poland) Damian Kulig (2 seasons: '10–'12)
