= FIBA Korać Cup Finals =

The FIBA Korać Cup Finals was the championship finals of the FIBA Korać Cup competition. FIBA Korać Cup was the name of the third-tier level European professional club basketball competition. The competition was organized by FIBA Europe. It was named after Radivoj Korać, a top Yugoslav basketball player.

== Title holders ==
- 1972: (Socialist Federal Republic of Yugoslavia) Lokomotiva
- 1973: (Italy) Birra Forst Cantù
- 1973–74: (Italy) Birra Forst Cantù
- 1974–75: (Italy) Birra Forst Cantù
- 1975–76: (Socialist Federal Republic of Yugoslavia) Jugoplastika
- 1976–77: (Socialist Federal Republic of Yugoslavia) Jugoplastika
- 1977–78: (Socialist Federal Republic of Yugoslavia) Partizan
- 1978–79: (Socialist Federal Republic of Yugoslavia) Partizan
- 1979–80: (Italy) Arrigoni Rieti
- 1980–81: (Spain) Joventut Freixenet
- 1981–82: (France) Limoges CSP
- 1982–83: (France) Limoges CSP
- 1983–84: (France) Orthez
- 1984–85: (Italy) Simac Milano
- 1985–86: (Italy) Banco Roma
- 1986–87: (Spain) FC Barcelona
- 1987–88: (Spain) Real Madrid
- 1988–89: (Socialist Federal Republic of Yugoslavia) Partizan
- 1989–90: (Spain) Ram Joventut
- 1990–91: (Italy) Shampoo Clear Cantù
- 1991–92: (Italy) il Messaggero Roma
- 1992–93: (Italy) Philips Milano
- 1993–94: (Greece) PAOK Bravo
- 1994–95: (Germany) Alba Berlin
- 1995–96: (Turkey) Efes Pilsen
- 1996–97: (Greece) Aris
- 1997–98: (Italy) Riello Mash Verona
- 1998–99: (Spain) FC Barcelona
- 1999–00: (France) Limoges CSP
- 2000–01: (Spain) Unicaja
- 2001–02: (France) SLUC Nancy

== Finals ==
Year	Host City	Champion	Runner Up	1st Game / Final	2nd Game	3rd Game	4th Game	5th Game
1972; Details	Belgrade & Zagreb	(Socialist Federal Republic of Yugoslavia) Lokomotiva	(Socialist Federal Republic of Yugoslavia) OKK Beograd	71–83	94–73	–		
1973; Details	Cantù & Mechelen	(Italy) Birra Forst Cantù	(Belgium) Maes Pils	106–75	85–94	–		
1973–74; Details	Cantù & Belgrade	(Italy) Birra Forst Cantù	(Socialist Federal Republic of Yugoslavia) Partizan	99–86	75–68	–		
1974–75; Details	Barcelona & Cantù	(Italy) Birra Forst Cantù	(Spain) CF Barcelona	71–69	110–85	–		
1975–76; Details	Split & Turin	(Socialist Federal Republic of Yugoslavia) Jugoplastika	(Italy) Chinamartini Torino	97–84	82–82	–		
1976–77; Details	Genoa	(Socialist Federal Republic of Yugoslavia) Jugoplastika	(Italy) Alco Bologna	87–84	–			
1977–78; Details	Banja Luka	(Socialist Federal Republic of Yugoslavia) Partizan	(Socialist Federal Republic of Yugoslavia) Bosna	117–110 (OT)	–			
1978–79; Details	Belgrade	(Socialist Federal Republic of Yugoslavia) Partizan	(Italy) Arrigoni Rieti	108–98	–			
1979–80; Details	Liège	(Italy) Arrigoni Rieti	(Socialist Federal Republic of Yugoslavia) Cibona	76–71	–			
1980–81; Details	Barcelona	(Spain) Joventut Freixenet	(Italy) Carrera Venezia	105–104 (OT)	–			
1981–82; Details	Padua	(France) Limoges CSP	(Socialist Federal Republic of Yugoslavia) Šibenka	90–84	–			
1982–83; Details	West Berlin	(France) Limoges CSP	(Socialist Federal Republic of Yugoslavia) Šibenka	94–86	–			
1983–84; Details	Paris	(France) Orthez	(Socialist Federal Republic of Yugoslavia) Crvena zvezda	97–73	–			
1984–85; Details	Brussels	(Italy) Simac Milano	(Italy) Ciaocrem Varese	91–78	–			
1985–86; Details	Caserta & Rome	(Italy) Banco Roma	(Italy) Mobilgirgi Caserta	84–78	73–72	–		
1986–87; Details	Barcelona & Limoges	(Spain) FC Barcelona	(France) Limoges CSP	106–85	97–86	–		
1987–88; Details	Madrid & Zagreb	(Spain) Real Madrid	(Socialist Federal Republic of Yugoslavia) Cibona	102–89	93–94	–		
1988–89; Details	Cucciago & Belgrade	(Socialist Federal Republic of Yugoslavia) Partizan	(Italy) Wiwa Vismara Cantù	76–89	101–82	–		
1989–90; Details	Pesaro & Badalona	(Spain) Ram Joventut	(Italy) Scavolini Pesaro	99–98	96–86	–		
1990–91; Details	Madrid & Cucciago	(Italy) Shampoo Clear Cantù	(Spain) Real Madrid Otaysa	73–71	95–93 (OT)	–		
1991–92; Details	Rome & Pesaro	(Italy) il Messaggero Roma	(Italy) Scavolini Pesaro	94–94	99–86	–		
1992–93; Details	Rome & Assago	(Italy) Philips Milano	(Italy) Virtus Roma	95–90	106–91	–		
1993–94; Details	Thessaloniki & Trieste	(Greece) PAOK Bravo	(Italy) Stefanel Trieste	75–66	100–91	–		
1994–95; Details	Assago & Berlin	(Germany) Alba Berlin	(Italy) Stefanel Milano	87–87	85–79	–		
1995–96; Details	Istanbul & Assago	(Turkey) Efes Pilsen	(Italy) Stefanel Milano	76–68	70–77	–		
1996–97; Details	Thessaloniki & Bursa	(Greece) Aris	(Turkey) Tofaş	66–77	88–70	–		
1997–98; Details	Verona & Belgrade	(Italy) Riello Mash Verona	(Federal Republic of Yugoslavia) Crvena zvezda	68–74	73–64	–		
1998–99; Details	Madrid & Barcelona	(Spain) FC Barcelona	(Spain) Adecco Estudiantes	77–93	97–70	–		
1999–00; Details	Limoges & Málaga	(France) Limoges CSP	(Spain) Unicaja	80–58	51–60	–		
2000–01; Details	Málaga & Vršac	(Spain) Unicaja	(Federal Republic of Yugoslavia) Hemofarm	77–47	71–69	–		
2001–02; Details	Nancy & Rostov-on-Don	(France) SLUC Nancy	(Russia) Lokomotiv Rostov	98–72	74–95	–		
