= Pallacanestro Cantù in international competitions =

Pallacanestro Cantù history and statistics in FIBA Europe and Euroleague Basketball competitions.

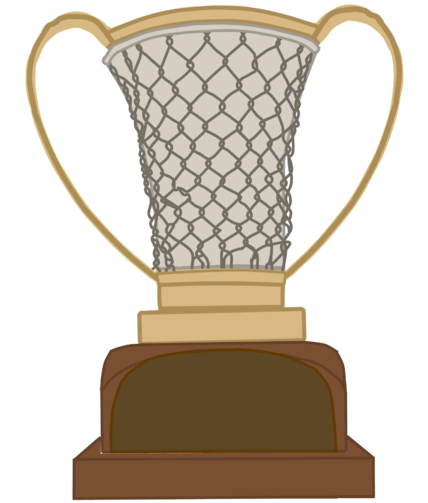
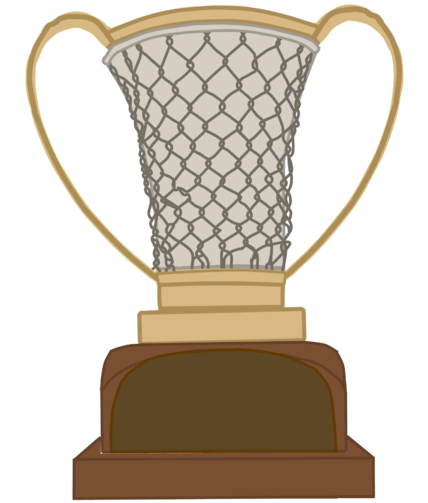
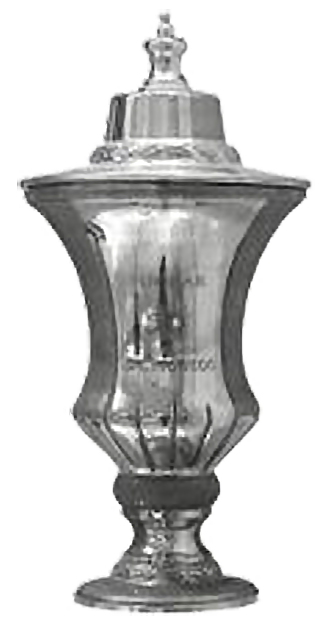
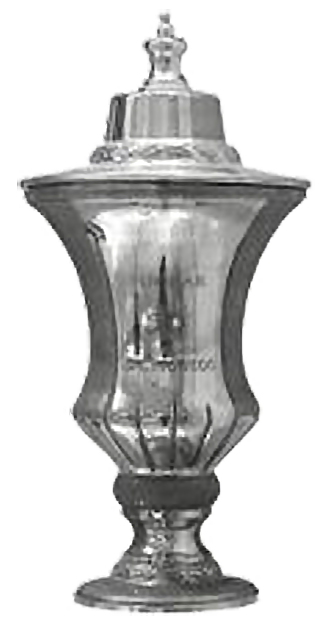
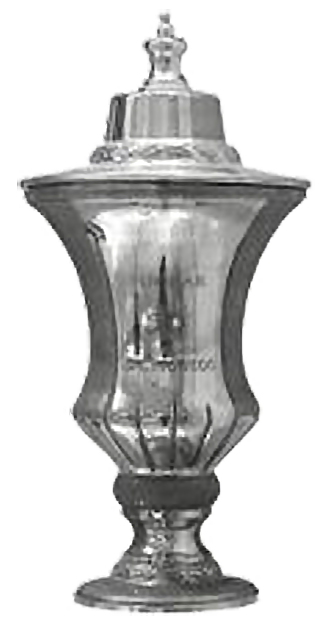
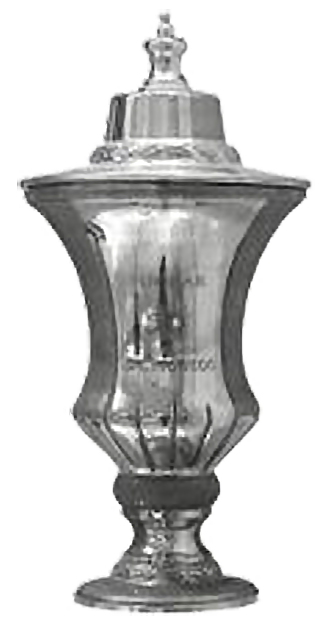

== European competitions ==
Record	Round	Opponent club			
1968–69 FIBA European Champions Cup 1st–tier
7–2 +1 draw	1st round	(Luxembourg) Black Star Mersch	97–51 (a)	124–53 (h)	
7–2 +1 draw	2nd round	(Albania) Partizani Tirana	73–73 (a)	90–63 (h)	
7–2 +1 draw	QF	(Czechoslovakia) Spartak ZJŠ Brno	69–60 (h)	68–82 (a)	
7–2 +1 draw	QF	(Belgium) Standard Liège	76–91 (a)	76–69 (h)	
7–2 +1 draw	QF	(Israel) Maccabi Tel Aviv	67–51 (a)	70–54 (h)	
1973 FIBA Korać Cup 3rd–tier
6–2	Top 12	(France) Berck	75–85 (a)	78–67 (h)	
6–2	Top 12	(Belgium) Standard Liège	90–56 (h)	106–93 (a)	
6–2	SF	(Spain) Filomatic Picadero	82–81 (a)	112–82 (h)	
6–2	F	(Belgium) Maes Pils	106–75, March 20, Palazzetto dello Sport Parini, Cantù; 85–94, March 27, Sporthal Winketkaai, Mechelen		
1973–74 FIBA Korać Cup 3rd–tier
5–3	2nd round	Bye	Forst qualified without games		
5–3	Top 12	(France) Olympique Antibes	107–77 (h)	84–96 (a)	
5–3	Top 12	(Spain) FC Barcelona	94–106 (a)	108–84 (h)	
5–3	SF	(France) ASVEL	99–68 (h)	76–94 (a)	
5–3	F	(Socialist Federal Republic of Yugoslavia) Partizan	99–86, April 4, Palazzetto dello Sport Parini, Cantù; 75–68, April 11, Hala sportova, Belgrade		
1974–75 FIBA Korać Cup 3rd–tier
3–1	2nd round	Bye	Forst qualified without games		
3–1	Top 16	(France) Vichy	Vichy withdrew without games		
3–1	Top 16	(Soviet Union) Dynamo Moscow	Dynamo Moscow withdrew without games		
3–1	Top 16	(Soviet Union) Stroitel	Stroitel withdrew without games		
3–1	SF	(Socialist Federal Republic of Yugoslavia) Partizan	88–101 (a)	84–67 (h)	
3–1	F	(Spain) FC Barcelona	71–69, March 18, Palau Blaugrana, Barcelona; 110–85, March 25, Palasport Pianella, Cucciago		
1975–76 FIBA European Champions Cup 1st–tier
10–4	2nd round	(Luxembourg) T71 Dudelange	97–76 (a)	110–47 (h)	
10–4	Top 12	(Spain) Real Madrid	93–88 (h)	98–105 (a)	
10–4	Top 12	(Switzerland) Federale	96–89 (a)	119–100 (h)	
10–4	Top 12	(Netherlands) Transol RZ	96–92 (a)	96–67 (h)	
10–4	Top 12	(Austria) Sefra Wien	94–63 (h)	86–76 (a)	
10–4	Top 12	(Israel) Maccabi Tel Aviv	76–88 (a)	106–81 (h)	
10–4	SF	(Italy) Mobilgirgi Varese	85–95 (a)	70–78 (h)	
1976–77 FIBA European Cup Winner's Cup 2nd–tier
9–2	2nd round	(Sweden) Högsbo	101–95 (a)	107–85 (h)	
9–2	QF	(Romania) Steaua București	85–88 (a)	99–77 (h)	
9–2	QF	(France) ASVEL	125–76 (h)	99–85 (a)	
9–2	QF	(Spain) Juventud Schweppes	105–76 (h)	86–93 (a)	
9–2	SF	(Italy) Cinzano Milano	101–78 (h)	98–95 (a)	
9–2	F	(Socialist Federal Republic of Yugoslavia) Radnički Belgrade	87–86; March 29, Nuevo Palacio de los Deportes, Palma de Mallorca		
1977–78 FIBA European Cup Winner's Cup 2nd–tier
7–2	2nd round	Bye	Gabetti qualified without games		
7–2	QF	(France) Caen	89–82 (h)	91–101 (a)	
7–2	QF	(Netherlands) Falcon Jeans EBBC	89–87 (a)	87–75 (h)	
7–2	QF	(Socialist Federal Republic of Yugoslavia) Kvarner	81–74 (a)	92–67 (h)	
7–2	SF	(Spain) FC Barcelona	87–90 (a)	97–77 (h)	
7–2	F	(Italy) Sinudyne Bologna	84–82; March 29, PalaLido, Milan		
1978–79 FIBA European Cup Winner's Cup 2nd–tier
6–3	2nd round	Bye	Gabetti qualified without games		
6–3	QF	(Netherlands) EBBC	90–95 (a)	91–75 (h)	
6–3	QF	(Poland) Śląsk Wrocław	80–70 (h)	108–81 (a)	
6–3	QF	(France) ASVEL	90–81 (h)	89–116 (a)	
6–3	SF	(Spain) FC Barcelona	84–89 (a)	101–83 (h)	
6–3	F	(Netherlands) EBBC	83–73; March 22, SRC Veli Jože, Poreč		
1979–80 FIBA European Cup Winner's Cup 2nd–tier
7–2	2nd round	Bye	Gabetti qualified without games		
7–2	QF	(Greece) Panathinaikos	106–103 (a)	119–79 (h)	
7–2	QF	(France) Caen	96–81 (h)	112–107 (a)	
7–2	QF	(Netherlands) Parker Leiden	100–86 (h)	108–112 (a)	
7–2	SF	(Spain) FC Barcelona	93–92 (a)	78–74 (h)	
7–2	F	(Italy) Emerson Varese	88–90; March 19, Palasport di San Siro, Milan		
1980–81 FIBA European Cup Winner's Cup 2nd–tier
9–0	2nd round	Bye	Squibb qualified without games		
9–0	QF	(France) Moderne	86–72 (h)	96–86 (a)	
9–0	QF	(Socialist Federal Republic of Yugoslavia) Cibona	99–81 (h)	99–98 (a)	
9–0	QF	(Soviet Union) Žalgiris	82–75 (a)	94–59 (h)	
9–0	SF	(Italy) Turisanda Varese	94–84 (a)	78–65 (h)	
9–0	F	(Spain) FC Barcelona	86–82; March 18, PalaEur, Rome		
1981–82 FIBA European Champions Cup 1st–tier
12–3	1st round	(Albania) Partizani Tirana	82–54 (h)	102–96 (a)	
12–3	1st round	(Portugal) Sporting	Sporting withdrew without games		
12–3	1st round	(Austria) UBSC Wien	84–81 (a)	91–75 (h)	
12–3	SF	(Spain) FC Barcelona	68–69 (a)	107–89 (h)	
12–3	SF	(Socialist Federal Republic of Yugoslavia) Partizan	90–74 (h)	89–104 (a)	
12–3	SF	(Greece) Panathinaikos	105–78 (h)	103–72 (a)	
12–3	SF	(Netherlands) Nashua EBBC	89–78 (a)	102–84 (h)	
12–3	SF	(Israel) Maccabi Tel Aviv	86–87 (a)	100–81 (h)	
12–3	F	(Israel) Maccabi Tel Aviv	86–80; March 25, Sporthalle, Cologne		
1982–83 FIBA European Champions Cup 1st–tier
11–3	1st round	(Luxembourg) T71 Dudelange	99–51 (a)	104–46 (h)	
11–3	2nd round	(Switzerland) Fribourg Olympic	112–75 (a)	108–79 (h)	
11–3	SF	(Italy) Billy Milano	69–63 (h)	66–71 (a)	
11–3	SF	(Socialist Federal Republic of Yugoslavia) Cibona	90–65 (a)	106–74 (h)	
11–3	SF	(Spain) Real Madrid	79–77 (a)	84–78 (h)	
11–3	SF	(Israel) Maccabi Tel Aviv	95–89 (h)	84–94 (a)	
11–3	SF	(Soviet Union) CSKA Moscow	77–78 (a)	106–73 (h)	
11–3	F	(Italy) Billy Milano	69–68; March 24, Palais des Sports, Grenoble		
1983–84 FIBA European Champions Cup 1st–tier
9–5	1st round	(Switzerland) Nyon	89–82 (a)	115–72 (h)	
9–5	2nd round	(Belgium) Sunair Oostende	77–88 (a)	76–59 (h)	
9–5	SF	(Israel) Maccabi Tel Aviv	74–65 (h)	77–79 (a)	
9–5	SF	(Socialist Federal Republic of Yugoslavia) Bosna	84–88 (a)	109–73 (h)	
9–5	SF	(Italy) Banco di Roma Virtus	86–85 (a)	71–79 (h)	
9–5	SF	(Spain) FC Barcelona	64–63 (h)	87–93 (a)	
9–5	SF	(France) Limoges	118–108 (a)	95–93 (h)	
1984–85 FIBA Korać Cup 3rd–tier
5–1	2nd round	Bye	Jollycolombani qualified without games		
5–1	Top 16	(Israel) Hapoel Haifa	104–85 (a)	122–87 (h)	
5–1	Top 16	(Socialist Federal Republic of Yugoslavia) Crvena zvezda	102–89 (h)	83–100 (a)	
5–1	Top 16	(Spain) Licor 43	96–95 (a)	92–80 (h)	
1986–87 FIBA Korać Cup 3rd–tier
6–2	2nd round	(Israel) Elitzur Netanya	91–85 (a)	88–86 (h)	
6–2	Top 16	(Socialist Federal Republic of Yugoslavia) Šibenka	107–78 (a)	97–87 (h)	
6–2	Top 16	(Soviet Union) Spartak Leningrad	79–77 (h)	83–88 (a)	
6–2	Top 16	(France) Limoges	83–98 (a)	97–88 (h)	
1987–88 FIBA Korać Cup 3rd–tier
4–4	2nd round	(Belgium) Trane Castors Braine	117–93 (h)	77–93 (a)	
4–4	Top 16	(Israel) Hapoel Tel Aviv	94–78 (h)	86–101 (a)	
4–4	Top 16	(Socialist Federal Republic of Yugoslavia) Jugoplastika	93–75 (h)	77–83 (a)	
4–4	Top 16	(Spain) CAI Zaragoza	85–95 (a)	93–89 (h)	
1988–89 FIBA Korać Cup 3rd–tier
10–4	1st round	(Czechoslovakia) VŠ Praha	93–79 (a)	106–91 (h)	
10–4	2nd round	(Turkey) Tofaş	84–87 (a)	86–72 (h)	
10–4	Top 16	(France) Orthez	100–86 (h)	102–96 (a)	
10–4	Top 16	(Soviet Union) Stroitel	108–97 (h)	88–103 (a)	
10–4	Top 16	(Netherlands) Direktbank Den Helder	92–70 (a)	107–78 (h)	
10–4	SF	(Italy) Philips Milano	95–81 (h)	65–70 (a)	
10–4	F	(Socialist Federal Republic of Yugoslavia) Partizan	89–76, March 16, Palasport Pianella, Cucciago; 82–101, March 22, Hala sportova, Belgrade		
1990–91 FIBA Korać Cup 3rd–tier
15–1	1st round	(Switzerland) Massagno	118–84 (a)	126–40 (h)	
15–1	2nd round	(Socialist Federal Republic of Yugoslavia) Vojvodina	81–82 (a)	88–85 (h)	
15–1	Top 16	(Greece) Panathinaikos	86–80 (a)	88–75 (h)	
15–1	Top 16	(Belgium) Trane Castors Braine	100–85 (a)	101–85 (h)	
15–1	Top 16	(Spain) Real Madrid	85–70 (h)	88–78 (a)	
15–1	QF	(Socialist Federal Republic of Yugoslavia) Cibona	80–70 (h)	80–77 (a)	
15–1	SF	(France) Mulhouse	85–82 (a)	64–54 (h)	
15–1	F	(Spain) Real Madrid	73–71, March 20, Palacio de Deportes de la Comunidad de Madrid, Madrid; 95–93, March 27, Palasport Pianella, Cucciago		
1991–92 FIBA Korać Cup 3rd–tier
8–4	2nd round	(Turkey) Paşabahçe	72–80 (a)	81–67 (h)	
8–4	Top 16	(Israel) Hapoel Tel Aviv	94–104 (a)	79–72 (h)	
8–4	Top 16	(Greece) Iraklis	85–80 (a)	96–73 (h)	
8–4	Top 16	(Spain) Fórum Filatélico	71–84 (h)	92–70 (a)	
8–4	QF	(Spain) Taugrés	86–73 (h)	78–77 (a)	
8–4	SF	(Italy) Scavolini Pesaro	76–74 (h)	86–89 (a)	
1992–93 FIBA Korać Cup 3rd–tier
11–3	2nd round	(Luxembourg) Amicale	104–65 (a)	105–72 (h)	
11–3	3rd round	(Slovenia) Optimizem Postojna	90–78 (a)	98–88 (h)	
11–3	Top 16	(Croatia) Zagreb	83–87 (a)	100–74 (h)	
11–3	Top 16	(Turkey) Fenerbahçe	97–80 (h)	62–73 (a)	
11–3	Top 16	(Belgium) Spirou	84–78 (a)	80–70 (h)	
11–3	QF	(Italy) Phonola Caserta	86–81 (a)	95–69 (h)	
11–3	SF	(Italy) Philips Milano	74–72 (h)	72–85 (a)	
1993–94 FIBA European League 1st–tier
3–13	2nd round	(Switzerland) Fidefinanz Bellinzona	104–105 (a)	90–75 (h)	
3–13	Top 16	(Spain) 7up Joventut	87–95 (h)	61–102 (a)	
3–13	Top 16	(France) Pau-Orthez	82–115 (a)	94–66 (h)	
3–13	Top 16	(Portugal) Benfica	74–65 (h)	64–83 (a)	
3–13	Top 16	(Turkey) Efes Pilsen	70–88 (a)	54–58 (h)	
3–13	Top 16	(Greece) Panathinaikos	75–85 (h)	75–79 (a)	
3–13	Top 16	(Italy) Buckler Bologna	60–71 (h)	57–88 (a)	
3–13	Top 16	(Croatia) Cibona	77–83 (a)	81–114 (h)	
1997–98 FIBA EuroCup 2nd–tier
11–3	1st round	(Hungary) Marc-Körmend	90–78 (a)	90–68 (h)	
11–3	1st round	Portugal Telecom	72–69 (a)	104–86 (h)	
11–3	1st round	(Germany) Bayer 04 Leverkusen	105–71 (h)	87–76 (a)	
11–3	1st round	(Belgium) Sunair Oostende	88–84 (h)	87–91 (a)	
11–3	1st round	(Bosnia and Herzegovina) Sloboda Dita Tuzla	92–77 (a)	101–62 (h)	
11–3	2nd round	(Slovakia) Slovakofarma Pezinok	87–95 (a)	79–59 (h)	
11–3	Top 16	(Federal Republic of Yugoslavia) Beobanka	58–88 (a)	78–75 (h)	
2004–05 ULEB Cup 2nd–tier
5–5	Regular season	(Russia) Dynamo Moscow	53–69 (a)	86–80 (h)	
5–5	Regular season	(Bulgaria) Lukoil Academic	108–111 (h)	75–78 (a)	
5–5	Regular season	(Greece) Aris Egnatia Bank	77–99 (a)	86–73 (h)	
5–5	Regular season	(Turkey) Türk Telekom	82–74 (a)	99–80 (h)	
5–5	Regular season	(Serbia and Montenegro) Reflex FMP	92–77 (h)	101–62 (a)	
2005–06 FIBA EuroCup 3rd–tier
5–7	Regular season	(France) Nancy	97–76 (h)	57–80 (a)	
5–7	Regular season	(Belgium) Dexia Mons-Hainaut	77–80 (a)	99–72 (h)	
5–7	Regular season	(Lithuania) Šiauliai	69–74 (a)	81–70 (h)	
5–7	Top 16	(Greece) Maroussi Honda	58–59 (a)	82–70 (h)	
5–7	Top 16	(Germany) RheinEnergie Köln	74–79 (h)	70–95 (a)	
5–7	Top 16	(Russia) Dynamo Moscow	97–80 (h)	76–92 (a)	
2010–11 Eurocup 2nd–tier
3–3	Regular season	(Greece) Panellinios	72–57 (h)	54–59 (a)	
3–3	Regular season	(Turkey) Galatasaray Café Crown	57–76 (a)	75–72 (h)	
3–3	Regular season	(Netherlands) GasTerra Flames	74–80 (a)	81–54 (h)	
2011–12 Euroleague 1st–tier
8–8	Regular season	(France) Nancy	80–69 (h)	75–76 (a)	
8–8	Regular season	(Spain) Caja Laboral	69–81 (a)	71–68 (h)	
8–8	Regular season	(Spain) Gescrap Bizkaia	78–69 (h)	67–64 (a)	
8–8	Regular season	(Greece) Olympiacos	64–63 (a)	61–86 (h)	
8–8	Regular season	(Turkey) Fenerbahçe Ülker	83–85 (a)	76–83 (h)	
8–8	Top 16	(Spain) FC Barcelona Regal	60–65 (a)	62–63 (h)	
8–8	Top 16	(Lithuania) Žalgiris	79–78 (h)	77–71 (a)	
8–8	Top 16	(Israel) Maccabi Tel Aviv	82–74 (h)	60–75 (a)	
2012–13 Euroleague 1st–tier
6–7	First qualifying round	(Bulgaria) Lukoil Academic	87–79, September 25, 2012, PalaDesio, Desio		
6–7	Second qualifying round	(Czech Republic) ČEZ Nymburk	89–83, September 27, 2012, PalaDesio, Desio		
6–7	Third qualifying round	(France) Le Mans	80–66, September 28, 2012, PalaDesio, Desio		
6–7	Regular season	(Slovenia) Union Olimpija	71–84 (h)	79–81 (a)	
6–7	Regular season	(Greece) Panathinaikos	76–78 (a)	69–71 (h)	
6–7	Regular season	(Russia) Khimki	67–54 (h)	53–77 (a)	
6–7	Regular season	(Spain) Real Madrid	66–80 (a)	76–70 (h)	
6–7	Regular season	(Turkey) Fenerbahçe Ülker	82–58 (h)	69–77 (a)	
2013–14 Eurocup 2nd–tier
11–5	Regular season	(Germany) Artland Dragons	88–86 (h)	81–68 (a)	
11–5	Regular season	(France) Le Mans	77–65 (a)	88–86 (h)	
11–5	Regular season	(Belgium) Telenet Oostende	83–58 (h)	75–77 (a)	
11–5	Regular season	(Czech Republic) ČEZ Nymburk	88–73 (h)	74–86 (a)	
11–5	Regular season	(Croatia) Cibona Zagreb	86–79 (a)	92–68 (h)	
11–5	Last 32	(France) JSF Nanterre	84–88 (a)	89–74 (h)	
11–5	Last 32	(Germany) Ratiopharm Ulm	97–106 (h)	85–77 (a)	
11–5	Last 32	(Turkey) Pınar Karşıyaka	84–55 (h)	80–93 (a)	
2014–15 Eurocup 2nd–tier
7–11	Regular season	(Spain) Herbalife Gran Canaria	81–101 (a)	63–80 (h)	
7–11	Regular season	(Germany) Artland Dragons	77–78 (h)	68–66 (a)	
7–11	Regular season	(France) Asvel Lyon Metropole	70–78 (a)	79–69 (h)	
7–11	Regular season	(France) Dijon	66–75 (a)	89–63 (h)	
7–11	Regular season	(Belgium) Telenet Oostende	68–60 (h)	77–83 (a)	
7–11	Last 32	(Russia) Khimki	62–75 (a)	99–88 (h)	
7–11	Last 32	(France) Limoges	68–57 (h)	70–81 (a)	
7–11	Last 32	(Greece) PAOK	78–70 (h)	77–78 (a)	
7–11	Eightfinals	(Russia) UNICS	64–70 (h)	72–75 (a)	136–145
2015–16 FIBA Europe Cup 3rd–tier
6–6	Regular season	(France) STB Le Havre	73–64 (h)	78–82 (a)	
6–6	Regular season	(Sweden) Borås	94–72 (h)	81–101 (a)	
6–6	Regular season	(Austria) ece Bulls Kapfenberg	85–70 (h)	91–95 (a)	
6–6	Round of 32	(France) Élan Chalon	103–90 (h)	78–89 (a)	
6–6	Round of 32	(Russia) Enisey	95–92 (h)	91–94 (a)	
6–6	Round of 32	(Estonia) Tartu Ülikool/Rock	71–76 (h)	87–83 (a)	
2018–19 Basketball Champions League 3rd–tier
2–2	First qualifying round	(Hungary) Szolnoki Olajbányász	69–68 (h)	90–71 (a)	159–139
2–2	Second qualifying round	(Belgium) Telenet Antwerp Giants	76–84 (h)	94–100 (a)	170–184

== Worldwide competitions ==
Record	Round	Opponent club	
1975 FIBA Intercontinental Cup
4–1	League stage	(Brazil) Amazonas Franca	82–81; September 13, Palazzetto dello Sport Lino Oldrini, Varese
4–1	League stage	(United States) Penn Quakers	112–88; September 14, Palasport Pianella, Cucciago
4–1	League stage	(Italy) Mobilgirgi Varese	83–87; September 15, Palazzetto dello Sport Lino Oldrini, Varese
4–1	League stage	(Spain) Real Madrid	96–94; September 16, Palasport Pianella, Cucciago
4–1	League stage	(Central African Republic) Hit Trésor	120–76; September 17, Palazzetto dello Sport Lino Oldrini, Varese
1982 FIBA Intercontinental Cup
5–0	League stage	(Netherlands) Elmex Leiden	92–75; September 28, Rotterdam Ahoy Sportpaleis, Rotterdam
5–0	League stage	(Israel) Maccabi Tel Aviv	76–73; September 29, Maaspoort Sports and Events, Den Bosch
5–0	League stage	(Argentina) Ferro Carril Oeste	102–75; October 1, Rotterdam Ahoy Sportpaleis, Rotterdam
5–0	League stage	(Netherlands) Nashua EBBC	70–68; October 2, Maaspoort Sports and Events, Den Bosch
5–0	League stage	(United States) Air Force Falcons	72–67; October 3, Maaspoort Sports and Events, Den Bosch
1983 FIBA Intercontinental Cup
3–2	League stage	(Uruguay) Peñarol	92–74; September 20, Estadio Obras Sanitarias, Buenos Aires
3–2	League stage	(United States) Oregon State Beavers	75–76; September 21, Estadio Obras Sanitarias, Buenos Aires
3–2	League stage	(Italy) Simac Milano	88–82; September 22, Estadio Obras Sanitarias, Buenos Aires
3–2	League stage	(Brazil) Monte Líbano	82–81; September 23, Estadio Obras Sanitarias, Buenos Aires
3–2	League stage	(Argentina) Obras Sanitarias	76–89; September 24, Estadio Obras Sanitarias, Buenos Aires
