= Panathinaikos B.C. in international competitions =

Panathinaikos B.C. in international competitions is the history and statistics of Panathinaikos B.C. in FIBA Europe and Euroleague Basketball Company competitions.

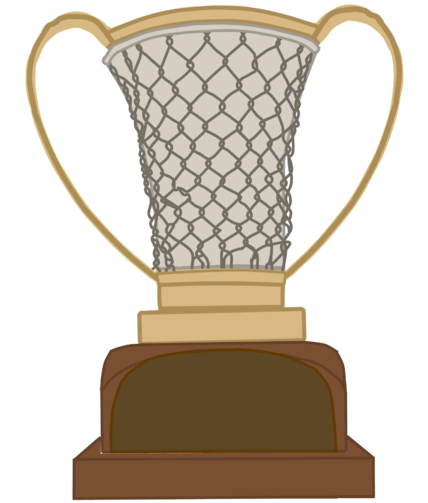
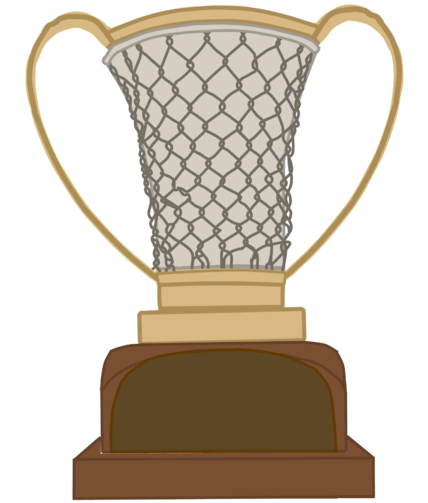

== European competitions ==
Record	Round	Opponent club					
1961–62 FIBA European Champions Cup 1st–tier
0–2	1st round	(Israel) Hapoel Tel Aviv	58–82 (a)	72–84 (h)			
1962–63 FIBA European Champions Cup 1st–tier
0–2	2nd round	(Spain) Real Madrid	73–97 (h)	60–90 (a)			
1967–68 FIBA European Champions Cup 1st–tier
2–2	1st round	(Romania) Steaua București	65–82 (a)	61–42 (h)			
2–2	2nd round	(Socialist Federal Republic of Yugoslavia) Zadar	79–70 (h)	62–89 (a)			
1968–69 FIBA European Cup Winners' Cup 2nd–tier
6–2	1st round	(Austria) Handelsministerium	76–84 (a)	95–55 (h)			
6–2	2nd round	(Portugal) Benfica	110–74 (a)	111–70 (h)			
6–2	QF	(Italy) Fides Napoli	20–00 (a)	20–00 (h)			
6–2	SF	(Soviet Union) Dinamo Tbilisi	81–67 (h)	71–103 (a)			
1969–70 FIBA European Champions Cup 1st–tier
1–1	2nd round	(Socialist Federal Republic of Yugoslavia) Crvena zvezda	66–91 (a)	83–75 (h)			
1970–71 FIBA European Cup Winners' Cup 2nd–tier
3–1	1st round	(West Germany) VfL Osnabrück	89–52 (h)	89–73 (a)			
3–1	2nd round	(Israel) Hapoel Tel Aviv	83–93 (a)	57–53 (h)			
1971–72 FIBA European Champions Cup 1st–tier
7–4 +1 draw	1st round	(Luxembourg) Amicale	98–63 (a)	94–67 (h)			
7–4 +1 draw	2nd round	(Israel) Maccabi Elite Tel Aviv	81–73 (h)	80–81 (a)			
7–4 +1 draw	QF	(Belgium) Bus Fruit Lier	84–117 (a)	70–55 (h)			
7–4 +1 draw	QF	(Socialist Federal Republic of Yugoslavia) Jugoplastika	63–87 (a)	94–83 (h)			
7–4 +1 draw	QF	(Czechoslovakia) Slavia VŠ Praha	99–73 (h)	74–74 (a)			
7–4 +1 draw	SF	(Italy) Ignis Varese	55–69 (a)	78–70 (h)			
1972–73 FIBA European Champions Cup 1st–tier
1–1	1st round	(Bulgaria) Academic	57–76 (a)	84–78 (h)			
1973–74 FIBA European Champions Cup 1st–tier
2–2	1st round	(Poland) Wybrzeże Gdańsk	70–87 (a)	97–70 (h)			
2–2	2nd round	(France) Berck	99–80 (h)	57–102 (a)			
1974–75 FIBA European Champions Cup 1st–tier
2–2	1st round	(Switzerland) Fribourg Olympic	89–76 (a)	99–78 (h)			
2–2	2nd round	(Israel) Maccabi Elite Tel Aviv	76–90 (h)	80–113 (a)			
1975–76 FIBA European Champions Cup 1st–tier
1–1	2nd round	(Finland) Turun NMKY	96–78 (h)	55–78 (a)			
1976–77 FIBA Korać Cup 3rd–tier
1–1	1st round	(Belgium) Standard Liège	90–75 (h)	62–78 (a)			
1977–78 FIBA European Champions Cup 1st–tier
5–1	QF	(Poland) Śląsk Wrocław	73–71 (h)	96–88 (a)			
5–1	QF	(Socialist Federal Republic of Yugoslavia) Jugoplastika	74–102 (a)	95–82 (h)			
5–1	QF	(Hungary) Honvéd	87–75 (h)	103–93 (a)			
1978–79 FIBA Korać Cup 3rd–tier
1–1	2nd round	(France) Orthez	73–102 (a)	88–67 (h)			
1979–80 FIBA European Cup Winners' Cup 2nd–tier
5–5	1st round	(Egypt) Union Récréation Alexandria	104–68 (a)	109–75 (h)			
5–5	2nd round	(Bulgaria) CSKA Sofia	93–96 (a)	100–85 (h)			
5–5	QF	(Italy) Gabetti Cantù	103–106 (h)	79–119 (a)			
5–5	QF	(Netherlands) Parker Leiden	88–86 (h)	86–95 (a)			
5–5	QF	(France) Caen	82–84 (a)	107–84 (h)			
1980–81 FIBA European Champions Cup 1st–tier
3–3	QF	(Israel) Maccabi Elite Tel Aviv	81–76 (h)	73–81 (a)			
3–3	QF	(France) ASPO Tours	88–81 (h)	88–103 (a)			
3–3	QF	(England) Sutton & Crystal Palace	84–99 (a)	106–102 (h)			
1981–82 FIBA European Champions Cup 1st–tier
4–10	1st round	(Syria) Al-Ittihad Aleppo	Al-Ittihad Aleppo withdrew without games				
4–10	1st round	(Soviet Union) CSKA Moscow	80–83 (a)	87–83 (h)			
4–10	1st round	(Bulgaria) Levski-Spartak	90–78 (h)	97–89 (a)			
4–10	SF	(Israel) Maccabi Elite Tel Aviv	91–112 (a)	78–86 (h)			
4–10	SF	(Spain) FC Barcelona	79–89 (h)	83–113 (a)			
4–10	SF	(Italy) Squibb Cantù	78–105 (a)	72–103 (h)			
4–10	SF	(Socialist Federal Republic of Yugoslavia) Partizan	91–106 (h)	83–98 (a)			
4–10	SF	(Netherlands) Nashua EBBC	88–77 (h)	88–89 (a)			
1982–83 FIBA European Champions Cup 1st–tier
1–1	1st round	(France) Moderne	58–55 (h)	67–112 (a)			
1983–84 FIBA European Cup Winners' Cup 2nd–tier
5–5	1st round	(Bulgaria) Levski-Spartak	81–73 (a)	88–79 (h)			
5–5	2nd round	(Austria) Landys&Gyr Wien	79–83 (a)	66–54 (h)			
5–5	QF	(Spain) Real Madrid	78–104 (a)	99–97 (h)			
5–5	QF	(Italy) Scavolini Pesaro	75–87 (a)	75–76 (h)			
5–5	QF	(Czechoslovakia) Rudá hvězda Pardubice	91–78 (h)	82–94 (a)			
1984–85 FIBA European Champions Cup 1st–tier
2–2	1st round	(Poland) Lech Poznań	83–86 (a)	96–87 (h)			
2–2	2nd round	(Italy) Granarolo Bologna	88–85 (h)	67–98 (a)			
1985–86 FIBA European Cup Winners' Cup 2nd–tier
2–2	1st round	(Luxembourg) Sparta Bertrange	101–73 (a)	89–72 (h)			
2–2	2nd round	(Switzerland) Vevey	75–82 (a)	79–84 (h)			
1986–87 FIBA European Cup Winners' Cup 2nd–tier
1–1	1st round	(West Germany) Steiner Bayreuth	71–84 (a)	74–67 (h)			
1987–88 FIBA Korać Cup 3rd–tier
1–1	1st round	(Israel) Hapoel Haifa	69–77 (a)	69–62 (h)			
1988–89 FIBA Korać Cup 3rd–tier
2–2	1st round	(Israel) Hapoel Holon	85–65 (h)	76–93 (a)			
2–2	2nd round	(Italy) Divarese Varese	79–76 (h)	73–91 (a)			
1989–90 FIBA Korać Cup 3rd–tier
1–1	1st round	(Israel) Hapoel Holon	71–87 (a)	80–65 (h)			
1990–91 FIBA Korać Cup 3rd–tier
3–7	1st round	(Czechoslovakia) Sparta Praha	72–64 (h)	72–75 (a)			
3–7	2nd round	(France) Olympique Antibes	97–80 (h)	93–100 (a)			
3–7	Top 16	(Italy) Clear Cantù	80–86 (h)	75–88 (a)			
3–7	Top 16	(Spain) Real Madrid	65–88 (a)	82–102 (h)			
3–7	Top 16	(Belgium) Trane Castors Braine	123–111 (h)	66–73 (a)			
1991–92 FIBA Korać Cup 3rd–tier
3–7	1st round	(France) Saint-Quentin	57–69 (a)	77–62 (h)			
3–7	2nd round	(Federal Republic of Yugoslavia) Vojvodina	74–77 (a)	81–68 (h)			
3–7	Top 16	(France) Pitch Cholet	75–84 (h)	68–90 (a)			
3–7	Top 16	(Italy) il Messaggero Roma	75–84 (a)	96–99 (h)			
3–7	Top 16	(Spain) CAI Zaragoza	71–67 (h)	80–94 (a)			
1993–94 FIBA European League 1st–tier
14–7	2nd round	(Bulgaria) Levski Sofia	84–68 (a)	81–79 (h)			
14–7	Top 16	(Portugal) Benfica	83–73 (h)	76–69 (a)			
14–7	Top 16	(Croatia) Cibona	80–74 (a)	72–67 (h)			
14–7	Top 16	(Turkey) Efes Pilsen	67–82 (h)	59–68 (a)			
14–7	Top 16	(Spain) 7up Joventut	85–61 (h)	86–81 (a)			
14–7	Top 16	(Italy) Clear Cantù	85–75 (a)	79–75 (h)			
14–7	Top 16	(France) Pau-Orthez	86–72 (h)	70–75 (a)			
14–7	Top 16	(Italy) Buckler Bologna	85–72 (a)	68–75 (h)			
14–7	QF	(France) Limoges CSP	68–75 (a)	59–48 (h)	87–73 (h)		
14–7	SF	(Greece) Olympiacos	72–77; April 19, Sports Palace at Yad Eliyahu, Tel Aviv				
14–7	3rd place game	(Spain) FC Barcelona	100–83; April 21, Sports Palace at Yad Eliyahu, Tel Aviv				
1994–95 FIBA European League 1st–tier
14–7	2nd round	(Ukraine) Inpromservis Kyiv	79–87 (a)	83–68 (h)			
14–7	Top 16	(Italy) Scavolini Pesaro	69–92 (a)	87–72 (h)			
14–7	Top 16	(Israel) Maccabi Elite Tel Aviv	63–62 (h)	91–92 (a)			
14–7	Top 16	(Russia) CSKA Moscow	70–77 (a)	101–77 (h)			
14–7	Top 16	(Portugal) Benfica	67–49 (a)	80–60 (h)			
14–7	Top 16	(Greece) PAOK Bravo	72–63 (h)	70–80 (a)			
14–7	Top 16	(Slovenia) Smelt Olimpija	65–62 (a)	79–66 (h)			
14–7	Top 16	(Spain) Real Madrid	77–64 (h)	68–66 (a)			
14–7	QF	(Italy) Buckler Bologna	68–85 (a)	63–55 (h)	99–56 (h)		
14–7	SF	(Greece) Olympiacos	52–58; April 11, Pabellón Príncipe Felipe, Zaragoza				
14–7	3rd place game	(France) Limoges CSP	91–77; April 13, Pabellón Príncipe Felipe, Zaragoza				
1995–96 FIBA European League 1st–tier
15–6	2nd round	(Lithuania) Žalgiris	59–56 (a)	86–66 (h)			
15–6	Top 16	(Spain) Real Madrid	54–52 (h)	73–80 (a)			
15–6	Top 16	(Spain) FC Barcelona	57–63 (a)	74–95 (h)			
15–6	Top 16	(Croatia) Cibona	79–61 (h)	93–82 (a)			
15–6	Top 16	(France) Pau-Orthez	87–79 (a)	67–69 (h)			
15–6	Top 16	(Portugal) Benfica	67–51 (h)	87–96 (a)			
15–6	Top 16	(Italy) Buckler Bologna	72–69 (a)	72–69 (h)			
15–6	Top 16	(Israel) Maccabi Elite Tel Aviv	67–62 (h)	86–79 (a)			
15–6	QF	(Italy) Benetton Treviso	70–67 (h)	69–83 (a)	65–64 (a)		
15–6	SF	(Russia) CSKA Moscow	81–71; April 9, Palais Omnisports de Paris-Bercy, Paris				
15–6	F	(Spain) FC Barcelona	67–66; April 11, Palais Omnisports de Paris-Bercy, Paris				
1996–97 FIBA EuroLeague 1st–tier
15–5	1st round	(Slovenia) Smelt Olimpija	75–67 (h)	76–74 (a)			
15–5	1st round	(Spain) FC Barcelona	58–77 (a)	79–75 (h)			
15–5	1st round	(France) ASVEL	66–72 (h)	80–74 (a)			
15–5	1st round	Croatia Osiguranje	72–50 (h)	65–58 (a)			
15–5	1st round	(Germany) Bayer 04 Leverkusen	78–67 (a)	87–79 (h)			
15–5	2nd round	(Russia) Dynamo Moscow	81–88 (a)	71–67 (h)			
15–5	2nd round	(Spain) Caja San Fernando	90–71 (h)	87–78 (a)			
15–5	2nd round	(France) Pau-Orthez	78–66 (a)	75–71 (h)			
15–5	Top 16	(France) Limoges CSP	68–67 (h)	70–55 (a)	– (h)		
15–5	QF	(Greece) Olympiacos	49–69 (h)	57–65 (a)	– (h)		
1997–98 FIBA EuroCup 2nd–tier
14–3 +1 draw	1st round	(Slovakia) Slovakofarma Pezinok	85–70 (a)	87–60 (h)			
14–3 +1 draw	1st round	(Israel) Maccabi Ironi Ra'anana	84–74 (a)	89–70 (h)			
14–3 +1 draw	1st round	(Russia) Avtodor Saratov	97–57 (h)	77–83 (a)			
14–3 +1 draw	1st round	(Ukraine) Budivelnyk	68–41 (h)	89–71 (a)			
14–3 +1 draw	1st round	(Austria) Sankt Pölten	88–57 (a)	101–62 (h)			
14–3 +1 draw	2nd round	(Germany) Bayer 04 Leverkusen	86–64 (a)	83–71 (h)			
14–3 +1 draw	Top 16	(Israel) Hapoel Eilat	78–80 (a)	86–68 (h)			
14–3 +1 draw	QF	(Poland) Śląsk Wrocław	82–58 (h)	61–61 (a)			
14–3 +1 draw	SF	(Italy) Stefanel Milano	77–58 (h)	61–86 (a)			
1998–99 FIBA EuroLeague 1st–tier
15–3	1st round	(Israel) Maccabi Elite Tel Aviv	84–62 (a)	67–58 (h)			
15–3	1st round	(Federal Republic of Yugoslavia) Crvena zvezda	77–71 (h)	76–74 (a)			
15–3	1st round	(Croatia) Cibona	69–61 (a)	83–70 (h)			
15–3	1st round	(Spain) TDK Manresa	74–58 (h)	63–58 (a)			
15–3	1st round	(Turkey) Efes Pilsen	77–63 (h)	80–53 (a)			
15–3	2nd round	(Russia) Avtodor Saratov	76–73 (a)	86–76 (h)			
15–3	2nd round	(Italy) Varese Roosters	82–71 (h)	54–63 (a)			
15–3	2nd round	(Spain) Tau Cerámica	77–74 (a)	86–63 (h)			
15–3	Top 16	(Italy) Teamsystem Bologna	58–63 (h)	64–88 (a)	– (h)		
1999–00 FIBA EuroLeague 1st–tier
19–4	1st round	(Lithuania) Žalgiris	82–66 (a)	86–82 (h)			
19–4	1st round	(Turkey) Tofaş	64–59 (a)	79–74 (h)			
19–4	1st round	(Slovenia) Union Olimpija	100–80 (h)	86–71 (a)			
19–4	1st round	(Spain) Real Madrid	96–69 (h)	66–63 (a)			
19–4	1st round	(Germany) Alba Berlin	73–54 (a)	70–72 (h)			
19–4	2 round	(Federal Republic of Yugoslavia) Crvena zvezda	76–61 (a)	67–58 (h)			
19–4	2 round	(France) Cholet	85–50 (h)	68–81 (a)			
19–4	2 round	(Greece) PAOK	77–69 (a)	71–75 (h)			
19–4	Top 16	(Federal Republic of Yugoslavia) Budućnost	65–59 (h)	64–77 (a)	78–61 (h)		
19–4	QF	(Croatia) Cibona	73–62 (h)	69–63 (a)	– (h)		
19–4	SF	(Turkey) Efes Pilsen	81–71; April 18, PAOK Sports Arena, Thessaloniki				
19–4	F	(Israel) Maccabi Elite Tel Aviv	73–67; April 18, PAOK Sports Arena, Thessaloniki				
2000–01 FIBA SuproLeague 1st–tier
18–6	Regular season	(Russia) CSKA Moscow	57–69 (a)	89–81 (h)			
18–6	Regular season	(Croatia) Split CO	59–68 (a)	64–60 (h)			
18–6	Regular season	(Poland) Śląsk Wrocław	85–79 (h)	76–63 (a)			
18–6	Regular season	(Italy) Montepaschi Siena	97–65 (a)	99–95 (h)			
18–6	Regular season	(Lithuania) Lietuvos rytas	104–83 (h)	78–87 (a)			
18–6	Regular season	(Turkey) Ülker	79–87 (a)	84–77 (h)			
18–6	Regular season	(Germany) Alba Berlin	92–75 (h)	71–79 (a)			
18–6	Regular season	(Israel) Maccabi Ness Ra'anana	82–68 (a)	83–61 (h)			
18–6	Regular season	(France) ASVEL	86–82 (h)	92–86 (a)			
18–6	Top 16	(Slovenia) Krka	82–65 (h)	86–79 (a)	– (h)		
18–6	QF	(Germany) Alba Berlin	87–77 (h)	71–69 (a)	– (h)		
18–6	SF	(Turkey) Efes Pilsen	74–66; May 11, Palais Omnisports de Paris-Bercy, Paris				
18–6	F	(Israel) Maccabi Elite Tel Aviv	67–81; May 13, Palais Omnisports de Paris-Bercy, Paris				
2001–02 Euroleague 1st–tier
19–3	Regular season	(Italy) Skipper Bologna	81–70 (h)	79–77 (a)			
19–3	Regular season	(Russia) CSKA Moscow	91–85 (a)	83–80 (h)			
19–3	Regular season	(France) Pau-Orthez	79–67 (a)	67–63 (h)			
19–3	Regular season	(Federal Republic of Yugoslavia) Budućnost	91–82 (h)	84–72 (a)			
19–3	Regular season	(Slovenia) Krka	81–82 (a)	98–92 (h)			
19–3	Regular season	(Croatia) Zadar	102–64 (h)	85–81 (a)			
19–3	Regular season	(Spain) Real Madrid	78–70 (a)	77–88 (h)			
19–3	Top 16	(Greece) Olympiacos	75–92 (a)	88–78 (h)			
19–3	Top 16	(Slovenia) Union Olimpija	85–67 (h)	79–72 (a)			
19–3	Top 16	(Greece) AEK	73–66 (a)	96–92 (h)			
19–3	SF	(Israel) Maccabi Elite Tel Aviv	83–75; May 3, PalaMalaguti, Bologna				
19–3	F	(Italy) Kinder Bologna	89–83; May 5, PalaMalaguti, Bologna				
2002–03 Euroleague 1st–tier
14–6	Regular season	(Serbia and Montenegro) Budućnost	87–71 (h)	92–84 (a)			
14–6	Regular season	(Lithuania) Žalgiris	94–79 (a)	98–84 (h)			
14–6	Regular season	(Israel) Maccabi Elite Tel Aviv	64–77 (h)	86–79 (a)			
14–6	Regular season	(Italy) Montepaschi Siena	69–77 (a)	64–56 (h)			
14–6	Regular season	(Spain) Tau Cerámica	76–75 (a)	86–83 (h)			
14–6	Regular season	(Spain) Unicaja	77–65 (h)	75–69 (a)			
14–6	Regular season	(Slovenia) Union Olimpija	70–77 (a)	65–63 (h)			
14–6	Top 16	(Italy) Skipper Bologna	81–67 (h)	63–88 (a)			
14–6	Top 16	(Italy) Montepaschi Siena	76–82 (a)	111–103 (h)			
14–6	Top 16	(Turkey) Ülker	78–74 (h)	73–92 (a)			
2003–04 Euroleague 1st–tier
9–11	Regular season	(Lithuania) Žalgiris	74–80 (a)	91–80 (h)			
9–11	Regular season	(Italy) Skipper Bologna	75–64 (h)	118–114 (a)			
9–11	Regular season	(Israel) Maccabi Elite Tel Aviv	75–97 (a)	84–91 (h)			
9–11	Regular season	(Russia) CSKA Moscow	58–69 (h)	68–75 (a)			
9–11	Regular season	(Italy) Montepaschi Siena	74–86 (a)	80–76 (h)			
9–11	Regular season	(Spain) Unicaja	91–67 (h)	78–83 (a)			
9–11	Regular season	(Slovenia) Krka	74–64 (a)	101–67 (h)			
9–11	Top 16	(Italy) Benetton Treviso	82–75 (h)	101–111 (a)			
9–11	Top 16	(Italy) Montepaschi Siena	67–86 (a)	77–86 (h)			
9–11	Top 16	(Spain) FC Barcelona	66–84 (h)	67–64 (a)			
2004–05 Euroleague 1st–tier
15–10	Regular season	(Spain) Unicaja	83–75 (a)	88–69 (h)			
15–10	Regular season	(Russia) CSKA Moscow	73–85 (h)	72–75 (a)			
15–10	Regular season	(Italy) Benetton Treviso	77–83 (a)	80–71 (h)			
15–10	Regular season	(Germany) Opel Skyliners	72–67 (h)	66–68 (a)			
15–10	Regular season	(Spain) Tau Cerámica	99–95 (h)	82–84 (a)			
15–10	Regular season	(Turkey) Ülker	64–66 (a)	79–72 (h)			
15–10	Regular season	(France) Pau-Orthez	103–89 (h)	88–62 (a)			
15–10	Top 16	(Lithuania) Žalgiris	84–73 (a)	83–78 (h)			
15–10	Top 16	(Italy) Climamio Bologna	73–77 (a)	78–55 (h)			
15–10	Top 16	(Spain) Tau Cerámica	93–81 (h)	69–86 (a)			
15–10	QF	(Turkey) Efes Pilsen	102–96 (h)	63–75 (a)	84–76 (h)		
15–10	SF	(Israel) Maccabi Elite Tel Aviv	82–91; May 6, Olimpiyskiy, Moscow				
15–10	3rd place game	(Russia) CSKA Moscow	94–91; May 8, Olimpiyskiy, Moscow				
2005–06 Euroleague 1st–tier
16–7	Regular season	(Turkey) Ülker	82–66 (a)	85–69 (h)			
16–7	Regular season	(Russia) CSKA Moscow	92–82 (h)	89–84 (a)			
16–7	Regular season	(Italy) Montepaschi Siena	82–78 (a)	89–79 (h)			
16–7	Regular season	(Serbia and Montenegro) Partizan Pivara MB	81–62 (h)	94–93 (a)			
16–7	Regular season	(Spain) Unicaja	79–82 (a)	93–95 (h)			
16–7	Regular season	(France) Pau-Orthez	82–67 (a)	94–62 (h)			
16–7	Regular season	(Spain) Real Madrid	87–71 (h)	90–73 (a)			
16–7	Top 16	(Croatia) Cibona VIP	70–72 (a)	88–69 (h)			
16–7	Top 16	(Italy) Benetton Treviso	69–76 (a)	81–70 (h)			
16–7	Top 16	(Turkey) Efes Pilsen	73–76 (h)	66–56 (a)			
16–7	QF	(Spain) Tau Cerámica	84–72 (h)	79–85 (a)	71–74 (h)		
2006–07 Euroleague 1st–tier
20–4	Regular season	(Spain) DKV Joventut	82–79 (a)	83–73 (h)			
20–4	Regular season	(Croatia) Cibona VIP	86–69 (h)	78–75 (a)			
20–4	Regular season	(Slovenia) Union Olimpija	86–65 (a)	83–74 (h)			
20–4	Regular season	(Italy) Lottomatica Roma	87–71 (h)	79–69 (a)			
20–4	Regular season	(Spain) Unicaja	87–72 (h)	61–67 (a)			
20–4	Regular season	(Serbia) Partizan	73–65 (a)	80–93 (h)			
20–4	Regular season	(Israel) Maccabi Elite Tel Aviv	90-88 (h)	73-76 (a)			
20–4	Top 16	(Turkey) Efes Pilsen	84–57 (h)	79–65 (a)			
20–4	Top 16	(Spain) Winterthur FC Barcelona	102–82 (h)	66–87 (a)			
20–4	Top 16	(Poland) Prokom Trefl Sopot	75–69 (a)	95–68 (h)			
20–4	QF	(Russia) Dynamo Moscow	80–58 (h)	73–65 (a)	– (h)		
20–4	SF	(Spain) Tau Cerámica	67–53; May 4, O.A.C.A. Olympic Indoor Hall, Athens				
20–4	F	(Russia) CSKA Moscow	93–91; May 6, O.A.C.A. Olympic Indoor Hall, Athens				
2007–08 Euroleague 1st–tier
15–5	Regular season	(Italy) Lottomatica Roma	86–83 (h)	67–85 (a)			
15–5	Regular season	(Germany) Brose Baskets	66–61 (h)	72–58 (a)			
15–5	Regular season	(Serbia) Partizan Igokea	94–90 (a)	67–66 (h)			
15–5	Regular season	(Spain) AXA FC Barcelona	76–66 (h)	56–55 (a)			
15–5	Regular season	(France) Chorale Roanne	123–83 (a)	102–78 (h)			
15–5	Regular season	(Turkey) Fenerbahçe Ülker	83–64 (a)	88–68 (h)			
15–5	Regular season	(Spain) Real Madrid	92–85 (h)	87–95 (a)			
15–5	Top 16	(Turkey) Efes Pilsen	64–74 (a)	74–65 (h)			
15–5	Top 16	(Serbia) Partizan Igokea	67–65 (h)	73–82 (a)			
15–5	Top 16	(Italy) Montepaschi Siena	75–84 (a)	77–76 (h)			
2008–09 Euroleague 1st–tier
17–5	Regular season	(Lithuania) Žalgiris	78–51 (h)	80–69 (a)			
17–5	Regular season	(Spain) Regal FC Barcelona	66–90 (a)	76–87 (h)			
17–5	Regular season	(France) SLUC Nancy	80–70 (a)	83–69 (h)			
17–5	Regular season	(Italy) Montepaschi Siena	81–76 (h)	77–82 (a)			
17–5	Regular season	(Poland) Asseco Prokom Sopot	67–60 (a)	75–53 (h)			
17–5	Top 16	(Serbia) Partizan	81–63 (h)	56–63 (a)			
17–5	Top 16	(Spain) Unicaja	81–69 (a)	103–95 (h)			
17–5	Top 16	(Italy) Lottomatica Roma	92–67 (h)	90–71 (a)			
17–5	QF	(Italy) Montepaschi Siena	90–85 (h)	79–84 (h)	72–53 (a)	91–84 (a)	– (h)
17–5	SF	(Greece) Olympiacos	84–82; May 1, O2 World, Berlin				
17–5	F	(Russia) CSKA Moscow	73–71; May 3, O2 World, Berlin				
2009–10 Euroleague 1st–tier
10–6	Regular season	(Italy) Armani Jeans Milano	75–67 (a)	80–68 (h)			
10–6	Regular season	(Russia) Khimki	101–66 (h)	87–82 (a)			
10–6	Regular season	(Spain) Real Madrid	70–80 (a)	67–76 (h)			
10–6	Regular season	(Poland) Asseco Prokom Gdynia	75–65 (a)	74–66 (h)			
10–6	Regular season	(Germany) EWE Baskets	96–63 (h)	67–64 (a)			
10–6	Top 16	(Serbia) Partizan	59–64 (h)	82–66 (a)			
10–6	Top 16	(Greece) Maroussi	78–80 (a)	82–79 (h)			
10–6	Top 16	(Spain) Regal FC Barcelona	71–83 (a)	67–70 (h)			
2010–11 Euroleague 1st–tier
16–6	Regular season	(Spain) Power Electronics Valencia	72–56 (a)	69–73 (h)			
16–6	Regular season	(Russia) CSKA Moscow	74–60 (h)	72–68 (a)			
16–6	Regular season	(Slovenia) Union Olimpija	84–85 (a)	95–88 (h)			
16–6	Regular season	(Turkey) Efes Pilsen	84–61 (h)	78–79 (a)			
16–6	Regular season	(Italy) Armani Jeans Milano	81–71 (a)	93–62 (h)			
16–6	Top 16	(Lithuania) Lietuvos rytas	80–59 (a)	67–68 (h)			
16–6	Top 16	(Spain) Unicaja	82–56 (h)	77–61 (a)			
16–6	Top 16	(Spain) Caja Laboral	70–77 (a)	76–74 (h)			
16–6	QF	(Spain) Regal FC Barcelona	82–83 (a)	75–71 (a)	76–74 (h)	78–67 (h)	– (a)
16–6	SF	(Italy) Montepaschi Siena	77–69; May 6, Palau Sant Jordi, Barcelona				
16–6	F	(Israel) Maccabi Electra Tel Aviv	78–70; May 8, Palau Sant Jordi, Barcelona				
2011–12 Euroleague 1st–tier
14–9	Regular season	(Spain) Unicaja	98–77 (h)	77–76 (a)			
14–9	Regular season	(Croatia) Zagreb CO	81–62 (a)	94–76 (h)			
14–9	Regular season	(Lithuania) Žalgiris	92–75 (h)	94–59 (a)			
14–9	Regular season	(Russia) CSKA Moscow	76–78 (h)	75–91 (a)			
14–9	Regular season	(Germany) Brose Baskets	76–79 (a)	71–66 (h)			
14–9	Top 16	(Italy) EA7 Emporio Armani Milano	78–57 (a)	58–67 (h)			
14–9	Top 16	(Russia) UNICS	83–89 (h)	68–63 (a)			
14–9	Top 16	(Turkey) Fenerbahçe Ülker	77–56 (a)	72–62 (h)			
14–9	QF	(Israel) Maccabi Electra Tel Aviv	93–73 (h)	92–94 (h)	62–65 (a)	78–69 (a)	86–85 (h)
14–9	SF	(Russia) CSKA Moscow	64–66; May 11, Sinan Erdem Dome, Istanbul				
14–9	3rd place game	(Spain) FC Barcelona Regal	69–74; May 13, Sinan Erdem Dome, Istanbul				
2012–13 Euroleague 1st–tier
17–12	Regular season	(Spain) Real Madrid	78–85 (a)	79–68 (h)			
17–12	Regular season	(Italy) Mapooro Cantù	78–76 (h)	71–69 (a)			
17–12	Regular season	(Slovenia) Union Olimpija	85–67 (a)	80–72 (h)			
17–12	Regular season	(Turkey) Fenerbahçe Ülker	64–73 (a)	69–55 (h)			
17–12	Regular season	(Russia) Khimki	67–79 (h)	77–78 (a)			
17–12	Top 16	(Lithuania) Žalgiris	67–66 (h)	78–73 (a)			
17–12	Top 16	(Turkey) Anadolu Efes	64–78 (a)	75–62 (h)			
17–12	Top 16	(Spain) Unicaja	78–73 (h)	60–66 (a)			
17–12	Top 16	(Germany) Alba Berlin	79–73 (a)	82–58 (h)			
17–12	Top 16	(Spain) Real Madrid	54–58 (h)	74–73 (a)			
17–12	Top 16	(Germany) Brose Baskets	76–73 (h)	82–60 (a)			
17–12	Top 16	(Russia) CSKA Moscow	69–86 (a)	63–69 (h)			
17–12	QF	(Spain) FC Barcelona Regal	70–72 (a)	66–65 (a)	65–63 (h)	60–70 (h)	53–64 (a)
2013–14 Euroleague 1st–tier
14–15	Regular season	(Lithuania) Lietuvos rytas	83–84 (a)	80–72 (h)			
14–15	Regular season	(Spain) Laboral Kutxa	95–74 (h)	77–79 (a)			
14–15	Regular season	(Serbia) Crvena zvezda Telekom	90–86 (a)	69–63 (h)			
14–15	Regular season	(Russia) Lokomotiv Kuban	69–72 (h)	82–63 (a)			
14–15	Regular season	(Israel) Maccabi Electra Tel Aviv	68–75 (a)	55–68 (h)			
14–15	Top 16	(Italy) EA7 Emporio Armani Milano	73–57 (h)	75–77 (a)			
14–15	Top 16	(Spain) Laboral Kutxa	72–64 (a)	61–68 (h)			
14–15	Top 16	(Turkey) Anadolu Efes	78–64 (h)	65–60 (a)			
14–15	Top 16	(Turkey) Fenerbahçe Ülker	72–77 (a)	76–67 (h)			
14–15	Top 16	(Spain) FC Barcelona	56–63 (h)	62–84 (a)			
14–15	Top 16	(Spain) Unicaja	71–87 (a)	69–60 (h)			
14–15	Top 16	(Greece) Olympiacos	66–62 (h)	65–68 (a)			
14–15	QF	(Russia) CSKA Moscow	74–77 (a)	51–77 (a)	65–59 (h)	73–72 (h)	44–74 (a)
2014–15 Euroleague 1st–tier
13–15	Regular season	(Poland) PGE Turów	84–77 (h)	79–69 (a)			
13–15	Regular season	(Germany) Bayern Munich	75–81 (a)	87–72 (h)			
13–15	Regular season	(Turkey) Fenerbahçe Ülker	91–73 (h)	62–84 (a)			
13–15	Regular season	(Italy) EA7 Emporio Armani Milano	90–63 (h)	64–66 (a)			
13–15	Regular season	(Spain) FC Barcelona	69–78 (a)	67–80 (h)			
13–15	Top 16	(Israel) Maccabi Electra Tel Aviv	83–76 (h)	70–73 (a)			
13–15	Top 16	(Spain) FC Barcelona	76–80 (a)	77–81 (h)			
13–15	Top 16	(Lithuania) Žalgiris	77–58 (h)	70–76 (a)			
13–15	Top 16	(Spain) Real Madrid	65–83 (a)	85–69 (h)			
13–15	Top 16	(Turkey) Galatasaray	86–77 (h)	86–84 (a)			
13–15	Top 16	(Germany) Alba Berlin	65–59 (a)	66–68 (h)			
13–15	Top 16	(Serbia) Crvena zvezda Telekom	74–69 (h)	68–69 (a)			
13–15	QF	(Russia) CSKA Moscow	66–93 (a)	80–100 (a)	86–85 (h)	55–74 (h)	– (a)
2015–16 Euroleague 1st–tier
15–12	Regular season	(Russia) Lokomotiv Kuban	70–81 (a)	71–77 (h)			
15–12	Regular season	(Turkey) Pınar Karşıyaka	85–73 (h)	69–66 (a)			
15–12	Regular season	(Spain) FC Barcelona Lassa	52–77 (a)	93–86 (h)			
15–12	Regular season	(Poland) Stelmet Zielona Góra	68–71 (a)	82–51 (h)			
15–12	Regular season	(Lithuania) Žalgiris	91–56 (h)	75–72 (a)			
15–12	Top 16	(Turkey) Fenerbahçe	75–82 (a)	76–71 (h)			
15–12	Top 16	(Spain) Unicaja	68–66 (h)	76–58 (a)			
15–12	Top 16	(Serbia) Crvena zvezda Telekom	63–74 (h)	67–69 (a)			
15–12	Top 16	(Russia) Lokomotiv Kuban	67–76 (a)	84–79 (h)			
15–12	Top 16	(Turkey) Darüşşafaka Doğuş	82–79 (h)	86–84 (a)			
15–12	Top 16	(Croatia) Cedevita	78–60 (a)	76–60 (h)			
15–12	Top 16	(Turkey) Anadolu Efes	83–78 (h)	86–91 (a)			
15–12	QF	(Spain) Laboral Kutxa	68–84 (a)	78–82 (a)	75–84 (h)	– (h)	– (a)
2016–17 Euroleague 1st–tier
19–14	Regular season	(Lithuania) Žalgiris	84–76 (h)	58–64 (a)			
19–14	Regular season	(Russia) CSKA Moscow	77–81 (a)	85–80 (h)			
19–14	Regular season	(Germany) Brose Bamberg	84–83 (a)	81–72 (h)			
19–14	Regular season	(Serbia) Crvena Zvezda Telekom	70–59 (h)	66–72 (a)			
19–14	Regular season	(Turkey) Anadolu Efes	83–91 (a)	92–81 (h)			
19–14	Regular season	(Israel) Maccabi Electra Tel Aviv	83–75 (h)	81–61 (a)			
19–14	Regular season	(Spain) Real Madrid	84–87 (a)	88–82 (h)			
19–14	Regular season	(Greece) Olympiacos	77–79 (h)	69–77 (a)			
19–14	Regular season	(Turkey) Darüşşafaka Doğuş	86–80 (h)	72–77 (a)			
19–14	Regular season	(Spain) FC Barcelona Lassa	57–72 (a)	71–65 (h)			
19–14	Regular season	(Turkey) Galatasaray Odeabank	85–58 (h)	84–79 (a)			
19–14	Regular season	(Turkey) Fenerbahçe	81–70 (h)	63–84 (a)			
19–14	Regular season	(Italy) EA7 Emporio Armani Milano	86–72 (a)	74–61 (h)			
19–14	Regular season	(Spain) Baskonia	69–68 (h)	72–63 (a)			
19–14	Regular season	(Russia) UNICS	81–83 (a)	83–82 (h)			
19–14	QF	(Turkey) Fenerbahçe	58–71 (h)	75–80 (h)	61–79 (a)	– (h)	– (a)
2017–18 Euroleague 1st–tier
19–14	Regular season	(Spain) FC Barcelona Lassa	71–98 (a)	84–75 (h)			
19–14	Regular season	(Germany) Brose Bamberg	93–83 (h)	74–95 (a)			
19–14	Regular season	(Russia) CSKA Moscow	63–81 (a)	70–75 (h)			
19–14	Regular season	(Turkey) Fenerbahçe	70–68 (h)	62–67 (a)			
19–14	Regular season	(Spain) Baskonia	84–85 (a)	80–76 (h)			
19–14	Regular season	(Greece) Olympiacos	70–62 (a)	85–87 (h)			
19–14	Regular season	(Russia) Khimki	93–65 (h)	61–78 (a)			
19–14	Regular season	(Turkey) Anadolu Efes	82–81 (a)	90–79 (h)			
19–14	Regular season	(Spain) Real Madrid	82–80 (h)	75–92 (a)			
19–14	Regular season	(Spain) Unicaja	82–71 (h)	90–79 (a)			
19–14	Regular season	(Lithuania) Žalgiris	74–80 (a)	94–93 (h)			
19–14	Regular season	(Italy) EA7 Emporio Armani Milano	80–72 (h)	96–95 (a)			
19–14	Regular season	(Israel) Maccabi Electra Tel Aviv	89–76 (h)	76–75 (a)			
19–14	Regular season	(Serbia) Crvena Zvezda Telekom	69–63 (a)	91–71 (h)			
19–14	Regular season	(Spain) Valencia	63–67 (a)	75–56 (h)			
19–14	QF	(Spain) Real Madrid	95–67 (h)	82–89 (h)	74–81 (a)	82–89 (a)	– (h)

== Worldwide competitions ==
Record	Round	Opponent club			
1996 FIBA Intercontinental Cup
2–1	F	(Argentina) Olimpia	83–89 (a)	83–78 (h)	101–76 (h)

== See also ==
- Greek basketball clubs in international competitions
