= Auxilium Pallacanestro Torino in international competitions =

Auxilium Pallacanestro Torino history and statistics in FIBA Europe and Euroleague Basketball (company) competitions.

== European competitions ==
Record	Round	Opponent club		
1975–76 FIBA Korać Cup 3rd–tier
6–5 +1 draw	2nd round	(France) Caen	54–79 a	90–60 h
6–5 +1 draw	Top 16	(Israel) Hapoel Tel Aviv	91–67 h	78–96 a
6–5 +1 draw	Top 16	(Spain) FC Barcelona	75–74 a	74–69 h
6–5 +1 draw	Top 16	(France) Olympique Antibes	97–101 a	89–63 h
6–5 +1 draw	SF	(Spain) Juventud Schweppes	83–107 a	79–54 h
6–5 +1 draw	F	(Socialist Federal Republic of Yugoslavia) Jugoplastika	84–97, March 16, Dvorana Gripe, Split; 82–82, March 23, Palasport Parco Ruffini, Turin	
1985–86 FIBA Korać Cup 3rd–tier
8–2	1st round	(Turkey) Çukurova Üniversitesi	93–86 a	114–74 h
8–2	2nd round	(Bulgaria) Spartak Pleven	96–90 a	101–88 h
8–2	Top 16	(Greece) PAOK	92–100 a	97–82 h
8–2	Top 16	(France) Olympique Antibes	89–78 h	71–92 a
8–2	Top 16	(Socialist Federal Republic of Yugoslavia) Zadar	114–105 a	85–68 h
1986–87 FIBA Korać Cup 3rd–tier
4–4	2nd round	(Greece) Panionios	70–66 a	99–71 h
4–4	Top 16	(Belgium) Assubel Mariembourg	92–97 a	83–65 h
4–4	Top 16	(Spain) CAI Zaragoza	80–82 h	92–96 a
4–4	Top 16	(Socialist Federal Republic of Yugoslavia) Partizan	90–101 a	91–90 h

== Record ==
Auxilium Pallacanestro Torino has overall, from 1975 to 1976 (first participation) to 1986–87 (last participation): 18 wins against 11 defeats plus 1 draw in 30 games for all the European club competitions.

- EuroLeague: –
  - EuroCup 6-4 (10)
    - FIBA Saporta Cup: –
      - FIBA Korać Cup: 18–11 plus 1 draw (30)
