= 1987–88 FIBA European Cup Winners' Cup =

- League: FIBA European Cup Winners' Cup
- Sport: Basketball

Finals
- Champions: (France) Limoges CSP
- Runners-up: (Spain) Ram Joventut

FIBA European Cup Winners' Cup seasons
- ← 1986–87 1988–89 →

The 1987–88 FIBA European Cup Winners' Cup was the twenty-second edition of FIBA's 2nd-tier level European-wide professional club basketball competition, contested between national domestic cup champions, running from 22 September 1987, to 16 March 1988. It was contested by 20 teams, one more than in the previous edition.

Limoges CSP won the competition, defeating Ram Joventut in the final, which was held in the Palais des Sports, of Grenoble.

== Participants ==
Country	Teams	Clubs
Austria	1	Sparkasse Wels
Belgium	1	Assubel Mariembourg
Bulgaria	1	Levski-Spartak
Cyprus	1	ENAD
England	1	Polycell Kingston
Finland	1	Uudenkaupungin Urheilijat
France	1	Limoges CSP
Greece	1	Panellinios
Hungary	1	Bajai
Israel	1	Hapoel Galil Elyon
Italy	1	Scavolini Pesaro
Luxembourg	1	Contern
Netherlands	1	Direktbank Den Helder
Portugal	1	Porto
Spain	1	Ram Joventut
Sweden	1	Alvik
Switzerland	1	Champel Genève
Turkey	1	Galatasaray
West Germany	1	Bayer 04 Leverkusen
(Socialist Federal Republic of Yugoslavia) Yugoslavia	1	IMT

== First round ==
Team 1	Agg.	Team 2	1st leg	2nd leg
Panellinios (Greece)	145–159	(Portugal) Porto	84–82	61–77
Bajai (Hungary)	162–176	(Sweden) Alvik	97–98	65–78
Champel Genève (Switzerland)	200–202	(Bulgaria) Levski-Spartak	116–115	84–87
Polycell Kingston (England)	166–164	(Netherlands) Direktbank Den Helder	84–82	84–82

== Second round ==
Team 1	Agg.	Team 2	1st leg	2nd leg
Sparkasse Wels (Austria)	156–222	(Socialist Federal Republic of Yugoslavia) IMT	87–97	69–125
ENAD (Cyprus)	90–244	(Italy) Scavolini Pesaro	41–143	49–101
Uudenkaupungin Urheilijat (Finland)	198–231	(France) Limoges CSP	94–123	104–108
Contern (Luxembourg)	136–187	(Spain) Ram Joventut	67–83	69–104
Porto (Portugal)	182–202	(Belgium) Assubel Mariembourg	91–86	91–116
Alvik (Sweden)	177–188	(Israel) Hapoel Galil Elyon	93–95	84–93
Levski-Spartak (Bulgaria)	159–180	(West Germany) Bayer 04 Leverkusen	92–86	67–94
Galatasaray (Turkey)	129–138	(England) Polycell Kingston	67–57	62–81

== Quarterfinals ==
Key to colors
Top two places in each group advance to semifinals

=== Group A ===
	(France) LIM	(West Germany) BAY	(England) KIN	(Socialist Federal Republic of Yugoslavia) IMT
(France) LIM		93-86	122-109	114-103
(West Germany) BAY	92-111		111-97	97-89
(England) KIN	106-108	75-79		94-92
(Socialist Federal Republic of Yugoslavia) IMT	93-102	84-81	89-99	

	Team	Pld	Pts	W	L	PF	PA	PD
1.	(France) Limoges CSP	6	12	6	0	650	589	+61
2.	(West Germany) Bayer 04 Leverkusen	6	9	3	3	546	549	-3
3.	(England) Polycell Kingston	6	8	2	4	580	601	-21
4.	(Socialist Federal Republic of Yugoslavia) IMT	6	7	1	5	550	587	-37

=== Group B ===
	(Spain) JOV	(Italy) SCA	(Israel) HGE	(Belgium) MAR
(Spain) JOV		106-95	101-83	91-82
(Italy) SCA	95-86		96-81	100-85
(Israel) HGE	91-101	89-86		100-95
(Belgium) MAR	84-93	81-94	57-83	

	Team	Pld	Pts	W	L	PF	PA	PD
1.	(Spain) Ram Joventut	6	11	5	1	578	530	+48
2.	(Italy) Scavolini Pesaro	6	10	4	2	566	528	+38
3.	(Israel) Hapoel Galil Elyon	6	9	3	3	527	536	-9
4.	(Belgium) Assubel Mariembourg	6	6	0	6	484	561	-77

== Semifinals ==
Team 1	Agg.	Team 2	1st leg	2nd leg
Limoges CSP (France)	193–179	(Italy) Scavolini Pesaro	102–86	91–93
Ram Joventut (Spain)	177–171	(West Germany) Bayer 04 Leverkusen	97–74	80–97

== Final ==
March 16, Palais des Sports, Grenoble

Team 1	Score	Team 2
Limoges CSP (France)	96–89	(Spain) Ram Joventut

1987–88 FIBA European Cup Winners' Cup Champions

Limoges CSP
1st title
