= José Biriukov =

Spanish-Soviet basketball player

Personal information
- Born: February 3, 1963 (age 63) Moscow, Russian SFSR, Soviet Union
- Listed height: 6 ft 4 in (1.93 m)

Career information
- Playing career: 1983–1995
- Position: Shooting guard

Career history
- 1983–1984: Dynamo Moscow
- 1984–1995: Real Madrid

Career highlights
- EuroLeague champion (1995); 2× FIBA Saporta Cup winner (1989, 1992); FIBA Korać Cup (1988); 4× Spanish League champion (1985, 1986, 1993, 1994); 4× Spanish Cup winner (1985, 1986, 1989, 1993); Spanish Supercup winner (1985)

José "Chechu" Biriukov Aguirregaviria (Russian: Хосе Александрович Бирюков, Khose Aleksandrovich Biryukov; born 3 February 1963) is a retired Spanish-Soviet professional basketball player. He was born in Moscow to a Russian father and a mother of Basque origin. Biriukov began playing basketball for Dynamo Moscow basketball team, before moving to Spain at the age of 20 to play for Real Madrid. He played a total of 11 seasons in Real Madrid, 22 games in the USSR national team and 67 for the Spain men's national basketball team.

He played as shooting guard and was a good three points shooter, using a particular style of shooting the ball flat to the basket. One of his most famous international games was playing the 1988 McDonald's Open against Boston Celtics.

== Career achievements ==
=== Club titles ===
International

- European League: 1 (with Real Madrid: 1994–95)
- European Cup Winners' Cup: 2 (with Real Madrid: 1988–89, 1991–92)
- Korać Cup: 1 (with Real Madrid: 1987–88)

Domestic

- Spanish League: 4 (with Real Madrid: 1984–85, 1985–86, 1992–93, 1993–94)
- Spanish Cup: 4 (with Real Madrid: 1984–85, 1985–86, 1988–89, 1992–93)
- Spanish Supercup: 1 (with Real Madrid: 1985)
