= 1988–89 FIBA European Cup Winners' Cup =

- League: FIBA European Cup Winners' Cup
- Sport: Basketball

Finals
- Champions: (Spain) Real Madrid
- Runners-up: (Italy) Snaidero Caserta

FIBA European Cup Winners' Cup seasons
- ← 1987–88 1989–90 →

The 1988–89 FIBA European Cup Winners' Cup was the twenty-third edition of FIBA's 2nd-tier level European-wide professional club basketball competition, contested between national domestic cup champions. It took place between 11 October 1988 and 14 March 1989. The final was played at the Peace and Friendship Stadium, in Piraeus, Greece, by Real Madrid of the Spanish League, and Snaidero Caserta of the Italian League.

== Participants ==
| Country | Teams | Clubs |
|---|---|---|
| Austria | 1 | Scholl Wels |
| Belgium | 1 | Maccabi Brussels |
| Bulgaria | 1 | CSKA Sofia |
| Cyprus | 1 | Achilleas |
| Finland | 1 | Uudenkaupungin Urheilijat |
| France | 1 | Pitch Cholet |
| Greece | 1 | AEK |
| Hungary | 1 | Oroszlányi Bányász |
| Israel | 1 | Hapoel Galil Elyon |
| Italy | 1 | Snaidero Caserta |
| Luxembourg | 1 | T71 Dudelange |
| Netherlands | 1 | Miniware Weert |
| Portugal | 1 | Porto |
| Scotland | 1 | Glasgow Rangers |
| Soviet Union | 1 | Žalgiris |
| Spain | 1 | Real Madrid |
| Sweden | 1 | Hageby |
| Switzerland | 1 | Pully |
| Turkey | 1 | Çukurova Üniversitesi |
| West Germany | 1 | Steiner Bayreuth |
| (Socialist Federal Republic of Yugoslavia) Yugoslavia | 1 | Cibona |

== First round ==
| Team 1 | Agg. | Team 2 | 1st leg | 2nd leg |
|---|---|---|---|---|
| Achilleas (Cyprus) | 151–201 | (Hungary) Oroszlányi Bányász | 76–86 | 75–115 |
| Hageby (Sweden) | 193–201 | (Finland) Uudenkaupungin Urheilijat | 100–113 | 93–88 |
| T71 Dudelange (Luxembourg) | 104–188 | (Netherlands) Miniware Weert | 64-94 | 40–94 |
| Porto (Portugal) | 195–222 | (Switzerland) Pully | 82-108 | 113–114 |
| Çukurova Üniversitesi (Turkey) | 148–151 | (Bulgaria) CSKA Sofia | 80-74 | 68–77 |

== Eighth-finals ==
| Team 1 | Agg. | Team 2 | 1st leg | 2nd leg |
|---|---|---|---|---|
| Oroszlányi Bányász (Hungary) | 146–169 | (Israel) Hapoel Galil Elyon | 69–70 | 77–99 |
| Uudenkaupungin Urheilijat (Finland) | 156–162 | (West Germany) Steiner Bayreuth | 76–80 | 80–82 |
| Miniware Weert (Netherlands) | 117–136 | (France) Pitch Cholet | 75-56 | 42–80 |
| Pully (Switzerland) | 168–173 | (Greece) AEK | 113-100 | 55–73 |
| CSKA Sofia (Bulgaria) | 154–187 | (Italy) Snaidero Caserta | 74-84 | 80–103 |
| Žalgiris (Soviet Union) | 207–170 | (Belgium) Maccabi Brussels | 108-71 | 99–99 |
| Glasgow Rangers (Scotland) | 180–250 | (Spain) Real Madrid | 89–116 | 91–134 |
| Scholl Wels (Austria) | 148–207 | (Socialist Federal Republic of Yugoslavia) Cibona | 71–97 | 77–110 |

== Quarterfinals ==
Key to colors
| Top two places in each group advance to semifinals |

=== Group A ===
| | (Spain) RMD | (Italy) CAS | (Israel) HGE | (France) CHO |
|---|---|---|---|---|
| (Spain) RMD | | 109-92 | 100-81 | 69-62 |
| (Italy) CAS | 94-95 | | 105-99 | 80-70 |
| (Israel) HGE | 82-92 | 89-92 | | 78-71 |
| (France) CHO | 95-85 | 85-76 | 78-87 | |

| | Team | Pld | Pts | W | L | PF | PA | PD |
|---|---|---|---|---|---|---|---|---|
| 1. | (Spain) Real Madrid | 6 | 11 | 5 | 1 | 550 | 506 | +44 |
| 2. | (Italy) Snaidero Caserta | 6 | 9 | 3 | 3 | 539 | 547 | -8 |
| 3. | (Israel) Hapoel Galil Elyon | 6 | 8 | 2 | 4 | 516 | 538 | -22 |
| 4. | (France) Pitch Cholet | 6 | 8 | 2 | 4 | 461 | 475 | -14 |

=== Group B ===
| | (Soviet Union) ŽAL | (Socialist Federal Republic of Yugoslavia) CIB | (West Germany) STB | (Greece) AEK |
|---|---|---|---|---|
| (Soviet Union) ŽAL | | 97-98 | 124-82 | 108-98 |
| (Socialist Federal Republic of Yugoslavia) CIB | 101-104 | | 79-80 | 94-82 |
| (West Germany) STB | 81-99 | 99-109 | | 89-67 |
| (Greece) AEK | 109-95 | 91-92 | 91-85 | |

| | Team | Pld | Pts | W | L | PF | PA | PD |
|---|---|---|---|---|---|---|---|---|
| 1. | (Soviet Union) Žalgiris | 6 | 10 | 4 | 2 | 627 | 569 | +58 |
| 2. | (Socialist Federal Republic of Yugoslavia) Cibona | 6 | 10 | 4 | 2 | 573 | 553 | +20 |
| 3. | (West Germany) Steiner Bayreuth | 6 | 8 | 2 | 4 | 516 | 569 | -53 |
| 4. | (Greece) AEK | 6 | 8 | 2 | 4 | 538 | 563 | -25 |

== Semifinals ==
| Team 1 | Agg. | Team 2 | 1st leg | 2nd leg |
|---|---|---|---|---|
| Žalgiris (Soviet Union) | 170–178 | (Italy) Snaidero Caserta | 86–80 | 84–98 |
| Cibona (Socialist Federal Republic of Yugoslavia) | 188–211 | (Spain) Real Madrid | 91–92 | 97–119 |

== Final ==
March 14, Peace and Friendship Stadium, Piraeus, Greece

| Team 1 | Score | Team 2 |
|---|---|---|
| Real Madrid (Spain) | 117–113 | (Italy) Snaidero Caserta |

1988–89 FIBA European Cup Winners' Cup Champions

Real Madrid
2nd title
