= 1990–91 FIBA Korać Cup =

- League: FIBA Korać Cup
- Sport: Basketball

Finals
- Champions: (Italy) Shampoo Clear Cantù
- Runners-up: (Spain) Real Madrid Otaysa

FIBA Korać Cup seasons
- ← 1989–90 1991–92 →

The 1990–91 FIBA Korać Cup was the 20th edition of FIBA's Korać Cup basketball competition. The Italian Shampoo Clear Cantu defeated the Spanish Real Madrid Otaysa in the final. This was Shampoo Clear Cantu's fourth time winning the title.

== First round ==
Team 1	Agg.	Team 2	1st leg	2nd leg
Fenerbahçe (Turkey)	142–155	(Belgium) Go Pass Verviers-Pepinster	83–77	59–78
APOEL (Cyprus)	110–174	(Italy) Antifurti Ranger Varese	55–87	55–87
ICED București (Romania)	148–245	(Soviet Union) VEF Rīga	89–106	59–139
Ludwigsburg (West Germany)	154–186	(Greece) Iraklis	92–91	62–95
Solna (Sweden)	173–185	(France) FC Mulhouse	81–92	92–93
Tungsram (Hungary)	147–187	(Turkey) Efes Pilsen	70–90	77–97
Citroën Klagenfurt (Austria)	153–141	(Czechoslovakia) Inter Slovnaft	69–59	84–82
KTP (Finland)	162–172	(Soviet Union) Budivelnyk	84–88	78–84
Möllersdorf Traiskirchen (Austria)	138–212	(Belgium) Trane Castors Braine	76–111	62–101
Stal Bobrek Bytom (Poland)	185–213	(Israel) Hapoel Tel Aviv	98–125	87–88
Magdeburg (East Germany)	113–243	(Socialist Federal Republic of Yugoslavia) Smelt Olimpija	46–122	67–121
Panathinaikos (Greece)	144–139	(Czechoslovakia) Sparta Praha	72–64	72–75
Beira-Mar (Portugal)	177–182	(France) Olympique Antibes	81–77	96–105
SKA Alma-Ata (Soviet Union)	156–151	(Bulgaria) Akademik Varna	85–63	71–88
Panasonic Reggio Calabria (Italy)	165–153	(Israel) Hapoel Jerusalem	71–62	94–91
Universitatea Cluj (Romania)	184–192	(Greece) Panionios	98–89	86–103
Etzella (Luxembourg)	173–175	(Netherlands) KBS Orca's	103–97	70–78
Charlottenburg (West Germany)	162–145	(Spain) Caja Ronda	88–77	74–68
AEK (Greece)	230–190	(Sweden) Alvik	123–98	107–92
Tofaş (Turkey)	150–175	(Italy) Phonola Caserta	74–86	76–89
Apollon Limassol (Cyprus)	150–175	(Spain) Estudiantes Caja Postal	74–86	76–89
Gravelines (France)	156–146	(Netherlands) Nashua EBBC	89–72	67–74
Honvéd (Hungary)	164–162	(Turkey) Çukurova Üniversitesi	96–86	68–76
Sunair Oostende (Belgium)	195–189	(France) Pau-Orthez	100–80	95–109
Kalev (Soviet Union)	193–172	(Czechoslovakia) Baník Cígeľ Prievidza	107–87	86–85
VGNN Donar (Netherlands)	153–192	(Socialist Federal Republic of Yugoslavia) Vojvodina	80–90	73–102
Massagno (Switzerland)	124–244	(Italy) Shampoo Clear Cantù	84–118	40–126
Maccabi Brussels (Belgium)	202–209	(Switzerland) Bellinzona	96–100	106–109

== Round of 32 ==
Team 1	Agg.	Team 2	1st leg	2nd leg
Go Pass Verviers-Pepinster (Belgium)	183–187	(Italy) Antifurti Ranger Varese	74–84	109–103
VEF Rīga (Soviet Union)	189–200	(Greece) Iraklis	113–97	76–103
FC Mulhouse (France)	174–166	(Turkey) Efes Pilsen	87–70	87–96
Citroën Klagenfurt (Austria)	110–192	(Spain) Real Madrid Otaysa	63–112	47–80
Budivelnyk (Soviet Union)	167–172	(Belgium) Trane Castors Braine	94–83	73–89
Hapoel Tel Aviv (Israel)	171–170	(Socialist Federal Republic of Yugoslavia) Smelt Olimpija	77–67	94–103
Panathinaikos (Greece)	190–180	(France) Olympique Antibes	97–80	93–100
SKA Alma-Ata (Soviet Union)	178–198	(Socialist Federal Republic of Yugoslavia) Cibona	82–88	96–110
Panasonic Reggio Calabria (Italy)	154–163	(Greece) Panionios	77–73	77–90
KBS Orca's (Netherlands)	143–165	(West Germany) Charlottenburg	70–71	73–94
AEK (Greece)	154–174	(Italy) Phonola Caserta	87–74	67–100
Estudiantes Caja Postal (Spain)	145–144	(France) Gravelines	77–66	68–78
Honvéd (Hungary)	147–189	(Belgium) Sunair Oostende	71–91	76–98
Kalev (Soviet Union)	156–167	(Socialist Federal Republic of Yugoslavia) Zadar	85–75	71–92
Vojvodina (Socialist Federal Republic of Yugoslavia)	167–169	(Italy) Shampoo Clear Cantù	82–81	85–88
Bellinzona (Switzerland)	164–242	(Spain) Montigalà Joventut	96–121	68–121

== Round of 16 ==
Key to colors
Top two places in each group advance to quarterfinals

=== Group A ===
	Team	Pld	Pts	W	L	PF	PA	PD
1.	(Italy) Shampoo Clear Cantù	6	12	6	0	548	473	+75
2.	(Spain) Real Madrid Otaysa	6	10	4	2	539	484	+55
3.	(Greece) Panathinaikos	6	7	1	5	491	548	−57
4.	(Belgium) Trane Castors Braine	6	7	1	5	518	591	−73

=== Group B ===
	Team	Pld	Pts	W	L	PF	PA	PD
1.	(Italy) Phonola Caserta	6	11	5	1	518	458	+60
2.	(Socialist Federal Republic of Yugoslavia) Cibona	6	9	3	3	535	480	+55
3.	(West Germany) Charlottenburg	6	8	2	4	502	540	−38
4.	(Israel) Hapoel Tel Aviv	6	8	2	4	481	558	−77

=== Group C ===
	Team	Pld	Pts	W	L	PF	PA	PD
1.	(Spain) Montigalà Joventut	6	11	5	1	532	387	+145
2.	(France) FC Mulhouse	6	9	3	3	466	533	−67
3.	(Italy) Antifurti Ranger Varese	6	8	2	4	523	563	−40
4.	(Greece) Iraklis	6	8	2	4	510	548	−38

=== Group D ===
	Team	Pld	Pts	W	L	PF	PA	PD
1.	(Socialist Federal Republic of Yugoslavia) Zadar	6	10	4	2	589	538	+51
2.	(Spain) Estudiantes Caja Postal	6	10	4	2	526	501	+25
3.	(Greece) Panionios	6	10	4	2	558	556	+2
4.	(Belgium) Sunair Oostende	6	6	0	6	524	602	−78

== Quarterfinals ==
Team 1	Agg.	Team 2	1st leg	2nd leg
Shampoo Clear Cantù (Italy)	160–147	(Socialist Federal Republic of Yugoslavia) Cibona	80–70	80–77
Phonola Caserta (Italy)	150–153	(Spain) Real Madrid Otaysa	92–79	58–74
Montigalà Joventut (Spain)	156–155	(Spain) Estudiantes Caja Postal	93–79	63–76
Zadar (Socialist Federal Republic of Yugoslavia)	151–164	(France) Mulhouse	84–84	67–80

== Semifinals ==
Team 1	Agg.	Team 2	1st leg	2nd leg
Real Madrid Otaysa (Spain)	151–149	(Spain) Montigalà Joventut	71–75	80–74
FC Mulhouse (France)	136–149	(Italy) Shampoo Clear Cantù	82–85	54–64

== Finals ==
Team 1	Agg.	Team 2	1st leg	2nd leg
Real Madrid Otaysa (Spain)	164–168	(Italy) Shampoo Clear Cantù	71–73	93–95*

- After extra-time. Originally Real beat with 77–79

1990–91 FIBA Korać Cup Champions

Shampoo Clear Cantù
4th title

== Rosters ==
(Italy) Cantù: Pierluigi Marzorati (C), Pace Mannion, Giuseppe Bosa, Davide Pessina, Roosevelt Bouie; Silvano Dal Seno, Andrea Gianolla, Angelo Gilardi, Alberto Rossini. Coach: Fabrizio Frates
(Spain) Real Madrid: Jose Luis Llorente, José Biriukov, Carl Herrera, Antonio Martin (C), Stanley Roberts; Josep Cargol, Fernando Romay, Enrique Villalobos, Ismael Santos. Coach: Ignacio Pinedo
