= 1983–84 FIBA Korać Cup =

- League: FIBA Korać Cup
- Sport: Basketball

Final
- Champions: (France) Orthez
- Runners-up: (Socialist Federal Republic of Yugoslavia) Crvena zvezda

FIBA Korać Cup seasons
- ← 1982–83 1984–85 →

The 1983–84 FIBA Korać Cup was the 13th edition of FIBA's Korać Cup basketball competition. The French Orthez defeated the Yugoslav Crvena zvezda in the final on March 15, 1984, in Paris, France. This was the third consecutive year in which a French team defeated a Yugoslav team in the final, and the third French victory overall.

== First round ==
Team 1	Agg.	Team 2	1st leg	2nd leg
Giants Osnabrück (West Germany)	177–158	(Greece) Iraklis	90–63	87–95
AEK (Greece)	220–153	(Luxembourg) Soleuvre	114–72	106–81
Csepel (Hungary)	167–194	(Turkey) Eczacıbaşı	90–95	77–99
Spartak Pleven (Bulgaria)	164–158	(Turkey) Beşiktaş	99–80	65–78
Intesit Caserta (Italy)	245–142	(Scotland) Sonex Falkirk	138–62	107–80

== Second round ==
Team 1	Agg.	Team 2	1st leg	2nd leg
Giants Osnabrück (West Germany)	136–159	(England) Sutton & Crystal Palace	76–101	60–58
AEK (Greece)	144–158	(France) Orthez	83–77	61–81
Eczacıbaşı (Turkey)	155–151	(Socialist Federal Republic of Yugoslavia) Partizan	93–72	62–79
Assubel Mariembourg (Belgium)	151–159	(France) Olympique Antibes	82–83	69–76
Spartak Pleven (Bulgaria)	136–157	(Italy) Bic Trieste	71–74	65–83
Binet Verviers-Pepinster (Belgium)	162–184	(Socialist Federal Republic of Yugoslavia) Crvena zvezda	89–95	73–89
İTÜ (Turkey)	0–4*	(France) Tours	0–2	0–2
Olympiacos (Greece)	0–4*	(Spain) CAI Zaragoza	0–2	0–2
Zadar (Socialist Federal Republic of Yugoslavia)	199–159	(Belgium) Standard Liège	104–81	95–78
Toptours Aarschot (Belgium)	184–187	(Greece) PAOK	87–74	97–113
Hapoel Ramat Gan (Israel)	169–180	(Italy) Intesit Caserta	103–72	66–108
Rapid București (Romania)	145–171	(Israel) Maccabi Ramat Gan	71–79	74–92
Keravnos (Cyprus)	111–214	(Italy) Carrera Venezia	48–108	63–106

^{*}İTÜ and Olympiacos withdrew before the first leg, and their rivals received a forfeit (2–0) in both games.

Automatically qualified to round of 16

- (Socialist Federal Republic of Yugoslavia) Šibenka
- (Italy) Star Varese
- (France) Moderne

== Round of 16 ==
Key to colors
Top place in each group advance to semifinals

=== Group A ===
	Team	Pld	Pts	W	L	PF	PA	PD
1.	(France) Olympique Antibes	6	11	5	1	466	452	+14
2.	(Israel) Maccabi Ramat Gan	6	10	4	2	502	498	+4
3.	(Italy) Carrera Venezia	6	9	3	3	497	482	+15
4.	(England) Sutton & Crystal Palace	6	6	0	6	444	477	−33

=== Group B ===
	Team	Pld	Pts	W	L	PF	PA	PD
1.	(Spain) CAI Zaragoza	6	12	6	0	574	474	+100
2.	(France) Tours	6	9	3	3	504	511	−7
3.	(Italy) Bic Trieste	6	8	2	4	444	473	−29
4.	(Socialist Federal Republic of Yugoslavia) Šibenka	6	7	1	5	493	557	−64

=== Group C ===
	Team	Pld	Pts	W	L	PF	PA	PD
1.	(France) Orthez	6	10	4	2	503	481	+22
2.	(Socialist Federal Republic of Yugoslavia) Zadar	6	10	4	2	541	524	+17
3.	(Italy) Star Varese	6	8	2	4	524	527	−3
4.	(Greece) PAOK	6	8	2	4	449	485	−36

=== Group D ===
	Team	Pld	Pts	W	L	PF	PA	PD
1.	(Socialist Federal Republic of Yugoslavia) Crvena zvezda	6	11	5	1	553	527	+26
2.	(France) Moderne	6	9	3	3	530	532	−2
3.	(Turkey) Eczacıbaşı	6	8	2	4	530	546	−16
4.	(Italy) Intesit Caserta	6	8	2	4	524	532	−8

== Semi finals ==
Team 1	Agg.	Team 2	1st leg	2nd leg
Orthez (France)	144–139	(France) Olympique Antibes	75–68	69–71
Crvena zvezda (Socialist Federal Republic of Yugoslavia)	217–208	(Spain) CAI Zaragoza	130–100	87–108

== Final ==
March 15, Palais des sports Pierre-de-Coubertin, Paris

Team 1	Score	Team 2
Orthez (France)	97–73	(Socialist Federal Republic of Yugoslavia) Crvena zvezda

1983–84 FIBA Korać Cup Champions

Orthez
1st title
