= 1989–90 FIBA Korać Cup =

- League: FIBA Korać Cup
- Sport: Basketball

Finals
- Champions: (Spain) Ram Joventut
- Runners-up: (Italy) Scavolini Pesaro

FIBA Korać Cup seasons
- ← 1988–89 1990–91 →

The 1989–90 FIBA Korać Cup was the 19th edition of FIBA's Korać Cup basketball competition. The Spanish Ram Joventut defeated the Italian Scavolini Pesaro in the final. This was Joventut's second time winning the title after a victory in 1981.

== First round ==
Team 1	Agg.	Team 2	1st leg	2nd leg
Montpellier (France)	227–187	(Hungary) ZTE	131–96	96–91
Hapoel Haifa (Israel)	140–161	(Italy) Phonola Caserta	75–81	65–80
WAT Wieden (Austria)	113–191	(Turkey) Efes Pilsen	66–80	47–111
Sparta Praha (Czechoslovakia)	161–163	(Switzerland) Bellinzona	88–83	73–80
Oroszlányi Bányász (Hungary)	169–198	(Turkey) Paşabahçe	81–98	88–100
Iraklis (Greece)	161–158	(Socialist Federal Republic of Yugoslavia) Crvena zvezda	99–81	62–77
Maccabi Brussels (Belgium)	198–186	(West Germany) Galatasaray Köln	110–100	88–86
Spartak Pleven (Bulgaria)	140–251	(Socialist Federal Republic of Yugoslavia) Zadar	72–119	68–132
Oldham Celtics (England)	186–203	(France) Monaco	88–112	98–91
Nyon (Switzerland)	157–212	(Spain) CAI Zaragoza	79–96	78–116
Tungsram (Hungary)	173–169	(Finland) Torpan Pojat	103–95	70–74
Achilleas Kaimakli (Cyprus)	118–262	(France) Pitch Cholet	64–124	54–138
Beslen Makarna (Turkey)	179–196	(West Germany) TTL Bamberg	111–92	68–104
Pezoporikos Larnaca (Cyprus)	165–218	(Greece) Panionios	88–99	77–119
Charlottenburg (West Germany)	138–187	(Italy) Benetton Treviso	70–96	68–91
Hapoel Galil Elyon (Israel)	151–152	(Socialist Federal Republic of Yugoslavia) Smelt Olimpija	70–73	81–79
Illiabum Clube (Portugal)	167–181	(Belgium) Monceau Jumet	84–75	83–106
Hapoel Holon (Israel)	152–151	(Greece) Panathinaikos	87–71	65–80
Caja Ronda (Spain)	142–145	(Belgium) Trane Castors Braine	75–80	67–65
KR (Iceland)	118–105	(England) Hemel Royals	53–45	65–60
Fribourg Olympic (Switzerland)	164–204	(France) Pau-Orthez	94–102	70–102
Contern (Luxembourg)	132–191	(Spain) Valvi Girona	80–98	52–93
Apollon Patras (Greece)	134–172	(Israel) Hapoel Tel Aviv	75–79	59–93
Fenerbahçe (Turkey)	154–178	(Socialist Federal Republic of Yugoslavia) Bosna	86–92	68–86
Möllersdorf Traiskirchen (Austria)	133–176	(West Germany) Ludwigsburg	81–84	52–92
Inter Slovnaft (Czechoslovakia)	180–133	(Denmark) Værløse	100–62	80–71

== Round of 32 ==
Team 1	Agg.	Team 2	1st leg	2nd leg
Montpellier (France)	195–213	(Italy) Phonola Caserta	95–97	100–116
Efes Pilsen (Turkey)	182–156	(Switzerland) Bellinzona	103–75	79–81
Paşabahçe (Turkey)	150–155	(Greece) Iraklis	80–82	70–73
Maccabi Brussels (Belgium)	201–219	(Socialist Federal Republic of Yugoslavia) Zadar	96–103	105–116
Monaco (France)	166–174	(Spain) CAI Zaragoza	89–79	77–95
Tungsram (Hungary)	132–190	(France) Pitch Cholet	72–89	60–101
TTL Bamberg (West Germany)	155–182	(Greece) Panionios	66–86	89–96
Benetton Treviso (Italy)	148–167	(Socialist Federal Republic of Yugoslavia) Smelt Olimpija	80–83	68–84
Monceau Jumet (Belgium)	169–209	(Spain) Ram Joventut	82–91	87–118
Hapoel Holon (Israel)	180–167	(Belgium) Trane Castors Braine	93–93	87–74
KR (Iceland)	153–199	(France) Pau-Orthez	78–97	75–102
Valvi Girona (Spain)	181–193	(Italy) Enimont Livorno	100–92	81–101
Hapoel Tel Aviv (Israel)	167–183	(Italy) Scavolini Pesaro	79–78	88–105
Bobcat Gent (Belgium)	156–211	(Socialist Federal Republic of Yugoslavia) Bosna	78–100	78–111
CSKA Moscow (Soviet Union)	210–174	(West Germany) Ludwigsburg	108–94	102–80
SKA Alma-Ata (Soviet Union)	178–164	(Czechoslovakia) Inter Slovnaft	103–86	75–78

== Round of 16 ==
Key to colors
Top two places in each group advance to quarterfinals

=== Group A ===
	Team	Pld	Pts	W	L	PF	PA	PD
1.	(Soviet Union) CSKA Moscow	6	10	4	2	514	477	+37
2.	(Socialist Federal Republic of Yugoslavia) Bosna	6	10	4	2	544	519	+25
3.	(Italy) Phonola Caserta	6	10	4	2	492	475	+17
4.	(Greece) Iraklis	6	6	0	6	485	564	−79

=== Group B ===
	Team	Pld	Pts	W	L	PF	PA	PD
1.	(Turkey) Efes Pilsen	6	10	4	2	540	524	+16
2.	(Greece) Panionios	6	9	3	3	557	559	−2
3.	(Soviet Union) SKA Alma-Ata	6	9	3	3	566	561	+5
4.	(Israel) Hapoel Holon	6	8	2	4	532	551	−18

=== Group C ===
	Team	Pld	Pts	W	L	PF	PA	PD
1.	(France) Pitch Cholet	6	9	3	3	549	539	+10
2.	(Italy) Enimont Livorno	6	9	3	3	539	541	−2
3.	(Spain) CAI Zaragoza	6	9	3	3	495	498	−3
4.	(Socialist Federal Republic of Yugoslavia) Smelt Olimpija	6	9	3	3	548	553	−5

=== Group D ===
	Team	Pld	Pts	W	L	PF	PA	PD
1.	(Spain) Ram Joventut	6	11	5	1	544	507	+37
2.	(Italy) Scavolini Pesaro	6	11	5	1	575	520	+55
3.	(Socialist Federal Republic of Yugoslavia) Zadar	6	7	1	5	557	574	−17
4.	(France) Pau-Orthez	6	7	1	5	496	571	−75

== Quarterfinals ==
Team 1	Agg.	Team 2	1st leg	2nd leg
Panionios (Greece)	160–191	(Soviet Union) CSKA Moscow	107–85	53–106
Efes Pilsen (Turkey)	169–224	(Socialist Federal Republic of Yugoslavia) Bosna	91–107	78–117
Enimont Livorno (Italy)	168–170	(Spain) Ram Joventut	88–87	80–83
Pitch Cholet (France)	169–206	(Italy) Scavolini Pesaro	75–102	94–104

== Semifinals ==
Team 1	Agg.	Team 2	1st leg	2nd leg
CSKA Moscow (Soviet Union)	184–196	(Italy) Scavolini Pesaro	90–89	94–107
Bosna (Socialist Federal Republic of Yugoslavia)	162–184	(Spain) Ram Joventut	90–90	72–94

== Finals ==
Team 1	Agg.	Team 2	1st leg	2nd leg
Scavolini Pesaro (Italy)	184–195	(Spain) Ram Joventut	98–99	86–96

1989–90 FIBA Korać Cup Champions

Ram Joventut
2nd title
