= Vendée Challans Basket =

French sports club

- Nickname: "VCB", "The Ducks"
- Leagues: LNB Élite 2
- Founded: January 26, 1936
- Arena: Salle Michel Vrignaud
- Capacity: 2,452
- Location: Challans, France
- Team colors: Red, White, Grey
- President: Jerome Sejourné
- Head coach: Sébastien Lambert
- Championships: 1 French Cup; 1 Pro B Championship; 1 NM1 Championship
- Website: challans-basket.com
Home	Away

Vendée Challans Basket is a professional basketball club that is based in the commune of Challans, France. The club plays in the LNB Élite 2, the second highest professional division in France.

== History ==
The club was founded in 1936 as Étoile Sportive du Marais Challans. In 1971, under the abbreviated name ESM Challans, the team was promoted to the National 1 League, the first division of the French Basketball Championship. Through the 1970's Challans often finished in sixth and seventh place, certifying itself as a leading member of the midfield. The team received invitations to play in the FIBA Korać Cup in both 1977 and 1979, losing in the first round each time to Carrera Venezia and Cotonificio. After many years in the top league a descent into the second division could not be prevented in 1981–82.

Challans quickly won the National 2 Championship in 1980 to receive promotion and return to the premier National 1 League. While playing in the top league, Challans defeated Lyon to win the French Cup in 1983, and made it as far as the Quarterfinals of the 1987 Korać Cup. In the early 1990's, after relegation to the National 2 League, Challans relegated itself to the National 4 League amid financial difficulties.

The team continued to play in the amateur fourth-highest division through the 1990's and early 2000's. In 2004 the club was renamed Vendée Challans Basket, and has played in the third-highest division, the NM1 League, since 2005.

After 20 years in the third division, Challans defeated Mulhouse 80–70 on 22 June, 2025, to win the NM1 Championship and receive a promotion to the ProB League for the 2025–26 season.

== Name through history ==
Names
- Étoile sportive du Marais Basket Challans (1936-1987)
- Challans Basket Club Vendée (1987-1988)
- Vendée Basket Challans (1988-1989)
- Basket-Ball Challans (1989-1996)
- Basket-Ball Challans Vendée (1996-2004)
- Vendée Challans Basket (2004 to present)

== Honours ==
Pro B Championship

- Winners (1): 1979–80

NM1 Championship

- Winners (1): 2024–25

French Cup

- Winners (1): 1982–83

== Season by season ==
Season	Tier	League	Pos.	French Cup	Other competitions
2016–17	3	NM1	5th	Round of 32	
2017–18	3	NM1	7th		
2018–19	3	NM1	1st		
2019–20	3	NM1	11th		
2020–21	3	NM1	7th		
2021–22	3	NM1	11th		
2022–23	3	NM1	8th	Round of 16	
2023–24	3	NM1	9th		
2024–25	3	NM1	2nd		
2025–26	2	Pro B			

== Notable players ==
- (United States) Barry White (1973–78)
- (United States) Murray Brown
- (France) Bruno Constant (1979–87)
- (France) Valéry Demory (1983–87)
- (United States) Kevin Figaro (1984–87)
- (France) Philippe Hervé (1985–86)
- (United States) Lance Berwald (1985–86)
- (The Bahamas) Rashad Davis (2022–24)
