= 1985–86 FIBA Korać Cup =

- League: FIBA Korać Cup
- Sport: Basketball

Final
- Champions: (Italy) Banco di Roma
- Runners-up: (Italy) Mobilgirgi Caserta

FIBA Korać Cup seasons
- ← 1984–85 1986–87 →

The 1985–86 FIBA Korać Cup was the 15th edition of FIBA's Korać Cup basketball competition. The Italian Banco di Roma defeated the Italian Mobilgirgi Caserta in the final. Three of the final four teams were from Italy, and this was the second consecutive year in which both of the final two teams were from Italy.

== First round ==
| Team 1 | Agg. | Team 2 | 1st leg | 2nd leg |
|---|---|---|---|---|
| Keravnos (Cyprus) | 96–267 | (Israel) Hapoel Tel Aviv | 38–140 | 58–127 |
| Manchester Giants (England) | 172–207 | (Spain) CAI Zaragoza | 83–90 | 89–117 |
| Super Cracks Werkendam (Netherlands) | 167–218 | (Spain) Caja Álava | 73–88 | 94–130 |
| Monthey (Switzerland) | 150–178 | (France) ASVEL | 74–83 | 76–95 |
| Solent Stars (England) | 151–170 | (Belgium) Boule d'or Andenne | 68–77 | 83–93 |
| Levski-Spartak (Bulgaria) | 188–191 | (Greece) PAOK | 105–87 | 83–104 |
| Iraklis (Greece) | 168–176 | (Bulgaria) Spartak Pleven | 92–78 | 76–98 |
| Çukurova Üniversitesi (Turkey) | 160–207 | (Italy) Berloni Torino | 86–93 | 74–114 |
| Eczacıbaşı (Turkey) | 160–162 | (West Germany) Steiner Bayreuth | 86–79 | 74–83 |
| Uudenkaupungin Urheilijat (Finland) | 196–201 | (West Germany) Charlottenburg | 103–95 | 93–106 |
| Contern (Luxembourg) | 143–209 | (Socialist Federal Republic of Yugoslavia) Partizan | 83–108 | 60–101 |
| Challans (France) | 187–175 | (Belgium) Spirale Herstal | 99–94 | 88–81 |
| AEK (Greece) | 193–192 | (Hungary) MAFC | 105–107 | 88–85 |
| Tyrolia Wienerwald (Austria) | 123–140 | (West Germany) SSV Hagen | 70–84 | 53–56 |
| Hapoel Holon (Israel) | 134–141 | (France) Olympique Antibes | 74–62 | 60–79 |
| Panionios (Greece) | 148–128 | (Belgium) Renault Gent | 72–64 | 76–64 |
| APOEL (Cyprus) | 156–313 | (Socialist Federal Republic of Yugoslavia) Zadar | 40–121 | 116–192 |
| Amicale Steinsel (Luxembourg) | 108–212 | (Spain) Cacaolat Granollers | 59–105 | 49–107 |
| Regenerin Klagenfurt (Austria) | 141–234 | (Belgium) Maes Pils | 69–109 | 72–125 |

== Second round ==
| Team 1 | Agg. | Team 2 | 1st leg | 2nd leg |
|---|---|---|---|---|
| Hapoel Tel Aviv (Israel) | 197–193 | (Spain) CAI Zaragoza | 104–89 | 93–104 |
| Caja Álava (Spain) | 172–182 | (France) ASVEL | 84–94 | 88–88 |
| Boule d'or Andenne (Belgium) | 157–188 | (Greece) PAOK | 81–96 | 76–92 |
| Spartak Pleven (Bulgaria) | 178–197 | (Italy) Berloni Torino | 90–96 | 88–101 |
| Steiner Bayreuth (West Germany) | 148–173 | (Italy) Mobilgirgi Caserta | 80–86 | 68–87 |
| Charlottenburg (West Germany) | 168–225 | (Socialist Federal Republic of Yugoslavia) Partizan | 89–96 | 79–129 |
| Challans (France) | 188–162 | (Greece) AEK | 102–77 | 86–85 |
| Hagen (West Germany) | 65–66 | (France) Olympique Antibes | 00–00* | 65–66 |
| Panionios (Greece) | 151–189 | (Socialist Federal Republic of Yugoslavia) Zadar | 78–97 | 73–92 |
| Cacaolat Granollers (Spain) | 177–176 | (Belgium) Maes Pils | 94–91 | 83–85 |

*The first leg was suspended in minute 9 (with Olympique Antibes winning 14–17) when one of the basket boards in Hagen's court was broken; although a replacement was quickly installed, it proved inadequate and the officials cancelled the game. Later, FIBA decided that the original two-legged match would be played as a single game in Antibes.

Automatically qualified to round of 16

- (Italy) Divarese Varese
- (Socialist Federal Republic of Yugoslavia) Crvena zvezda
- (France) Orthez
- (Italy) Banco di Roma
- (Socialist Federal Republic of Yugoslavia) Bosna
- (Spain) Breogán Caixa Galicia

== Round of 16 ==
Key to colors
| Top place in each group advance to semifinals |

=== Group A ===
| | Team | Pld | Pts | W | L | PF | PA | PD |
|---|---|---|---|---|---|---|---|---|
| 1. | (Italy) Divarese Varese | 6 | 10 | 4 | 2 | 517 | 472 | +45 |
| 2. | (Socialist Federal Republic of Yugoslavia) Crvena zvezda | 6 | 10 | 4 | 2 | 584 | 549 | +35 |
| 3. | (France) ASVEL | 6 | 10 | 4 | 2 | 541 | 522 | +19 |
| 4. | (Spain) Breogán Caixa Galicia | 6 | 6 | 0 | 6 | 516 | 615 | −99 |

=== Group B ===
| | Team | Pld | Pts | W | L | PF | PA | PD |
|---|---|---|---|---|---|---|---|---|
| 1. | (France) Olympique Antibes | 6 | 10 | 4 | 2 | 513 | 478 | +35 |
| 2. | (Italy) Berloni Torino | 6 | 10 | 4 | 2 | 548 | 525 | +23 |
| 3. | (Socialist Federal Republic of Yugoslavia) Zadar | 6 | 8 | 2 | 4 | 509 | 516 | −7 |
| 4. | (Greece) PAOK | 6 | 8 | 2 | 4 | 484 | 535 | −51 |

=== Group C ===
| | Team | Pld | Pts | W | L | PF | PA | PD |
|---|---|---|---|---|---|---|---|---|
| 1. | (Italy) Banco di Roma | 6 | 10 | 4 | 2 | 547 | 500 | +47 |
| 2. | (Israel) Hapoel Tel Aviv | 6 | 10 | 4 | 2 | 531 | 546 | −15 |
| 3. | (Socialist Federal Republic of Yugoslavia) Bosna | 6 | 9 | 3 | 3 | 581 | 584 | −3 |
| 4. | (France) Challans | 6 | 7 | 1 | 5 | 514 | 543 | −29 |

=== Group D ===
| | Team | Pld | Pts | W | L | PF | PA | PD |
|---|---|---|---|---|---|---|---|---|
| 1. | (Italy) Mobilgirgi Caserta | 6 | 11 | 5 | 1 | 553 | 505 | +48 |
| 2. | (France) Orthez | 6 | 9 | 3 | 3 | 551 | 528 | +23 |
| 3. | (Socialist Federal Republic of Yugoslavia) Partizan | 6 | 9 | 3 | 3 | 578 | 594 | −16 |
| 4. | (Spain) Cacaolat Granollers | 6 | 7 | 1 | 5 | 517 | 572 | −55 |

== Semi finals ==
| Team 1 | Agg. | Team 2 | 1st leg | 2nd leg |
|---|---|---|---|---|
| Divarese Varese (Italy) | 159–162 | (Italy) Mobilgirgi Caserta | 84–71 | 75–91 |
| Olympique Antibes (France) | 144–161 | (Italy) Banco di Roma | 69–78 | 75–83 |

== Finals ==
| Team 1 | Agg. | Team 2 | 1st leg | 2nd leg |
|---|---|---|---|---|
| Mobilgirgi Caserta (Italy) | 150–157 | (Italy) Banco di Roma | 78–84 | 72–73 |

1985–86 FIBA Korać Cup Champions

Banco di Roma
1st title
