= 1986–87 FIBA Korać Cup =

- League: FIBA Korać Cup
- Sport: Basketball

Finals
- Champions: (Spain) FC Barcelona
- Runners-up: (France) Limoges CSP

FIBA Korać Cup seasons
- ← 1985–86 1987–88 →

The 1986–87 FIBA Korać Cup was the 16th edition of FIBA's Korać Cup basketball competition. The Spanish FC Barcelona defeated the French Limoges CSP in the final.

== First round ==
Team 1	Agg.	Team 2	1st leg	2nd leg
Karşıyaka (Turkey)	161–160	(Belgium) Renault Gent	87–68	74–92
Sanjoanense (Portugal)	102–185	(Belgium) Maccabi Brussels	54–93	48–92
Elitzur Netanya (Israel)	246–106	(Cyprus) Keravnos	139–54	107–52
Vevey (Switzerland)	195–225	(Spain) Gin MG Sarriá	98–106	97–119
Videoton (Hungary)	175–165	(Turkey) Çukurova Üniversitesi	93–75	82–90
CEP Fleurus (Belgium)	182–203	(Socialist Federal Republic of Yugoslavia) Jugoplastika	104–103	78–100
Uudenkaupungin Urheilijat (Finland)	193–158	(West Germany) Charlottenburg	100–72	93–86
CSKA Sofia (Bulgaria)	162–172	(Greece) PAOK	85–83	77–89
Portsmouth (England)	158–165	(Socialist Federal Republic of Yugoslavia) Šibenka	96–76	62–89
Athleta Juvenis (Malta)	87–166	(France) Avignon	35–83	52–83
Contern (Luxembourg)	131–209	(Belgium) Assubel Mariembourg	67–107	64–102
AEL (Cyprus)	158–238	(Greece) Panionios	74–122	84–116
Apollon Patras (Greece)	151–205	(Israel) Hapoel Tel Aviv	71–88	80–117

== Second round ==
Team 1	Agg.	Team 2	1st leg	2nd leg
Karşıyaka (Turkey)	153–167	(Socialist Federal Republic of Yugoslavia) Budućnost	71–82	82–85
Maccabi Brussels (Belgium)	194–198	(Spain) CAI Zaragoza	112–91	82–107
Elitzur Netanya (Israel)	171–179	(Italy) Arexons Cantù	85–91	86–88
Gin MG Sarriá (Spain)	205–208	(France) Olympique Antibes	113–100	92–108
Videoton (Hungary)	132–198	(France) Challans	77–107	55–91
Fribourg Olympic (Switzerland)	146–239	(Socialist Federal Republic of Yugoslavia) Jugoplastika	81–119	65–120
Uudenkaupungin Urheilijat (Finland)	149–187	(Soviet Union) Spartak Leningrad	80–90	69–97
PAOK (Greece)	154–159	(Socialist Federal Republic of Yugoslavia) Partizan	79–69	75–90
ZTE (Hungary)	165–210	(Socialist Federal Republic of Yugoslavia) Šibenka	84–96	81–114
Avignon (France)	160–174	(Spain) Estudiantes Caja Postal	74–86	86–88
Assubel Mariembourg (Belgium)	198–144	(Greece) Olympiacos	95–70	103–74
Panionios (Greece)	137–169	(Italy) Berloni Torino	66–70	71–99
Hapoel Tel Aviv (Israel)	167–197	(Italy) Divarese Varese	92–85	75–112

Automatically qualified to round of 16

- (Italy) Mobilgirgi Caserta
- (Spain) FC Barcelona
- (France) Limoges CSP

== Round of 16 ==
Key to colors
Top place in each group advance to semifinals

=== Group A ===
	Team	Pld	Pts	W	L	PF	PA	PD
1.	(France) Limoges CSP	6	11	5	1	593	522	+71
2.	(Italy) Arexons Cantù	6	10	4	2	546	516	+30
3.	(Soviet Union) Spartak Leningrad	6	9	3	3	489	510	−21
4.	(Socialist Federal Republic of Yugoslavia) Šibenka	6	6	0	6	521	601	−80

=== Group B ===
	Team	Pld	Pts	W	L	PF	PA	PD
1.	(Spain) FC Barcelona	6	10	4	2	555	468	+87
2.	(Italy) Divarese Varese	6	9	3	3	525	507	+18
3.	(France) Olympique Antibes	6	9	3	3	533	567	−34
4.	(Socialist Federal Republic of Yugoslavia) Jugoplastika	6	8	2	4	493	564	−71

=== Group C ===
	Team	Pld	Pts	W	L	PF	PA	PD
1.	(Spain) CAI Zaragoza	6	10	4	2	542	520	+22
2.	(Socialist Federal Republic of Yugoslavia) Partizan	6	10	4	2	590	561	+29
3.	(Italy) Berloni Torino	6	8	2	4	528	531	−3
4.	(Belgium) Assubel Mariembourg	6	8	2	4	504	552	−48

=== Group D ===
	Team	Pld	Pts	W	L	PF	PA	PD
1.	(Italy) Mobilgirgi Caserta	6	12	6	0	570	527	+43
2.	(Spain) Estudiantes Caja Postal	6	9	3	3	614	595	+19
3.	(France) Challans	6	8	2	4	539	544	−5
4.	(Socialist Federal Republic of Yugoslavia) Budućnost	6	7	1	5	537	594	−57

== Semi finals ==
Team 1	Agg.	Team 2	1st leg	2nd leg
CAI Zaragoza (Spain)	167–189	(France) Limoges CSP	76–85	91–104
Mobilgirgi Caserta (Italy)	184–200	(Spain) FC Barcelona	96–87	88–113

== Finals ==
Team 1	Agg.	Team 2	1st leg	2nd leg
FC Barcelona (Spain)	203–171	(France) Limoges CSP	106–85	97–86

1986–87 FIBA Korać Cup Champions

FC Barcelona
1st title
