= 1987–88 FIBA Korać Cup =

- League: FIBA Korać Cup
- Sport: Basketball

Finals
- Champions: (Spain) Real Madrid
- Runners-up: (Socialist Federal Republic of Yugoslavia) Cibona

FIBA Korać Cup seasons
- ← 1986–87 1988–89 →

The 1987–88 FIBA Korać Cup season occurred between September 23, 1987, and March 9, 1988. The final was played by Real Madrid of Spain and Cibona of Yugoslavia.

== First round ==
Team 1	Agg.	Team 2	1st leg	2nd leg
Divarese Varese (Italy)	229–150	(Luxembourg) T71 Dudelange	115–61	114–89
Maccabi Brussels (Belgium)	188–191	Racing Club de France	90–102	98–89
Inter Slovnaft (Czechoslovakia)	271–112	(Cyprus) Olympia Nicosia	153–58	118–54
Akademik Varna (Bulgaria)	145–156	(Turkey) Beşiktaş	86–75	59–81
Achilleas Kaimakli (Cyprus)	90–217	(Israel) Maccabi Haifa	49–96	41–121
Nyon (Switzerland)	158–163	(Belgium) Boigelot Charleroi	69–93	89–70
Charlottenburg (West Germany)	228–159	(Switzerland) Vevey	104–60	114–99
Olympique Antibes (France)	178–168	(Switzerland) SMB Lausanne	103–77	75–91
Trane Castors Braine (Belgium)	209–155	(Portugal) Illiabum Clube	112–76	97–79
Mattersburg (Austria)	163–225	(Czechoslovakia) Nová huť Ostrava	88–100	75–125
Iraklis (Greece)	181–148	(Bulgaria) Spartak Pleven	101–65	80–83
Hapoel Haifa (Israel)	139–138	(Greece) Panathinaikos	77–69	62–69
Elitzur Netanya (Israel)	193–163	(Socialist Federal Republic of Yugoslavia) Šibenka	91–76	102–87
Gießen 46ers (West Germany)	181–217	(France) Monaco	87–101	94–116
Manchester United (England)	145–142	(Greece) Panionios	77–66	68–76
Honvéd (Hungary)	142–205	(Socialist Federal Republic of Yugoslavia) Jugoplastika	78–102	64–103
KTP (Finland)	181–175	(West Germany) 1.FC 01 Bamberg	109–79	72–97

== Second round ==
Team 1	Agg.	Team 2	1st leg	2nd leg
Divarese Varese (Italy)	181–194	Racing Club de France	98–98	83–96
Inter Slovnaft (Czechoslovakia)	163–210	(Israel) Hapoel Tel Aviv	86–111	77–99
Crvena zvezda (Socialist Federal Republic of Yugoslavia)	218–155	(Turkey) Beşiktaş	104–80	114–75
Maccabi Haifa (Israel)	178–182	(France) ASVEL	103–89	75–93
Real Madrid (Spain)	182–135	(Belgium) Boigelot Charleroi	98–74	84–61
Charlottenburg (West Germany)	153–163	(Spain) CAI Zaragoza	88–64	65–99
Olympique Antibes (France)	189–209	(Greece) PAOK	82–98	107–111
Arexons Cantù (Italy)	194–186	(Belgium) Trane Castors Braine	117–93	77–93
Nová huť Ostrava (Czechoslovakia)	144–199	(Italy) Dietor Bologna	63–89	81–110
Iraklis (Greece)	167–199	(Spain) Estudiantes Todagrés	100–98	67–101
Hapoel Haifa (Israel)	167–189	(Italy) Snaidero Caserta	91–103	76–86
Elitzur Netanya (Israel)	149–135	(Belgium) Sunair Oostende	77–66	72–69
Efes Pilsen (Turkey)	123–126	(France) Monaco	69–67	54–59
Manchester United (England)	178–177	(Spain) TDK Manresa	94–80	84–97
Jugoplastika (Socialist Federal Republic of Yugoslavia)	224–156	(Turkey) Beslen Makarna	114–73	110–83
Cibona (Socialist Federal Republic of Yugoslavia)	265–211	(Finland) KTP	138–110	127–101

== Round of 16 ==
Key to colors
Top place in each group advance to semifinals

=== Group A ===
	Team	Pld	Pts	W	L	PF	PA	PD
1.	(Spain) Real Madrid	6	11	5	1	527	474	+53
2.	(Italy) Dietor Bologna	6	10	4	2	515	492	+23
3.	(Israel) Elitzur Netanya	6	8	2	4	511	517	−6
4.	(France) Monaco	6	7	1	5	502	572	−70

=== Group B ===
	Team	Pld	Pts	W	L	PF	PA	PD
1.	(Socialist Federal Republic of Yugoslavia) Cibona	6	12	6	0	595	524	+71
2.	Racing Club de France	6	9	3	3	528	533	−5
3.	(England) Manchester United	6	8	2	4	581	623	−42
4.	(Italy) Snaidero Caserta	6	7	1	5	614	638	−24

=== Group C ===
	Team	Pld	Pts	W	L	PF	PA	PD
1.	(Socialist Federal Republic of Yugoslavia) Crvena zvezda	6	11	5	1	582	517	+65
2.	(France) ASVEL	6	10	4	2	548	508	+40
3.	(Spain) Estudiantes Todagrés	6	8	2	4	483	567	−84
4.	(Greece) PAOK	6	7	1	5	524	545	−21

=== Group D ===
	Team	Pld	Pts	W	L	PF	PA	PD
1.	(Israel) Hapoel Tel Aviv	6	10	4	2	521	506	+15
2.	(Italy) Arexons Cantù	6	9	3	3	528	521	+7
3.	(Socialist Federal Republic of Yugoslavia) Jugoplastika	6	9	3	3	473	501	−28
4.	(Spain) CAI Zaragoza	6	8	2	4	530	524	+6

== Semi finals ==
Team 1	Agg.	Team 2	1st leg	2nd leg
Crvena zvezda (Socialist Federal Republic of Yugoslavia)	154–170	(Spain) Real Madrid	82–89	72–81
Hapoel Tel Aviv (Israel)	182–204	(Socialist Federal Republic of Yugoslavia) Cibona	93–103	89–101

== Finals ==
Team 1	Agg.	Team 2	1st leg	2nd leg
Real Madrid (Spain)	195–183	(Socialist Federal Republic of Yugoslavia) Cibona	102–89	93–94

1987–88 FIBA Korać Cup Champions

Real Madrid
1st title
