= 1988–89 FIBA Korać Cup =

- League: FIBA Korać Cup
- Sport: Basketball

Finals
- Champions: (Socialist Federal Republic of Yugoslavia) Partizan
- Runners-up: (Italy) Wiwa Vismara Cantù

FIBA Korać Cup seasons
- ← 1987–88 1989–90 →

The 1988–89 FIBA Korać Cup was the 18th edition of FIBA's Korać Cup basketball competition. The Yugoslav Partizan defeated the Italian Wiwa Vismara Cantù in the final. This was the third time Partizan won the title, following victories in 1978 and 1979.

== First round ==
Team 1	Agg.	Team 2	1st leg	2nd leg
Trane Castors Braine (Belgium)	174–175	(West Germany) Charlottenburg	96–100	78–75
Olympiacos (Greece)	189–131	(Poland) Górnik Wałbrzych	91–76	98–55
TTL Bamberg (West Germany)	212–166	(Switzerland) Massagno	118–87	94–79
Galatasaray (Turkey)	173–171	(Switzerland) Nyon	98–87	75–84
Allibert Livorno (Italy)	155–161	(Czechoslovakia) Inter Slovnaft	74–75	81–86
Panathinaikos (Greece)	161–158	(Israel) Hapoel Holon	85–65	76–93
Regenerin Klagenfurt (Austria)	145–231	(Turkey) Efes Pilsen	96–130	49–101
Levski-Spartak (Bulgaria)	201–163	(Hungary) Bajai	113–76	88–87
Cuva Houthalen (Belgium)	188–190	(Finland) Torpan Pojat	93–87	95–103
Sparta Bertrange (Luxembourg)	140–196	(England) Manchester Eagles	68–93	72–103
Assubel Mariembourg (Belgium)	158–157	(France) Nantes	88–81	70–76
Tofaş (Turkey)	127–126	(Hungary) Szolnoki Honvéd	72–62	55–64
VŠ Praha (Czechoslovakia)	170–199	(Italy) Wiwa Vismara Cantù	79–93	91–106
MIM Livingston (Scotland)	164–166	(Netherlands) Direktbank Den Helder	87–93	77–73
Racing Club de Paris (France)	172–166	(West Germany) Bayer 04 Leverkusen	83–80	89–86
Birmingham Bullets (England)	156–192	(Spain) CajaCanarias	84–96	72–96
Maes Pils (Belgium)	171–170	(Portugal) Benfica	83–75	88–95
ASVEL (France)	161–218	(Greece) PAOK	83–93	78–125
Crvena zvezda (Socialist Federal Republic of Yugoslavia)	188–143	(Turkey) Fenerbahçe	101–64	87–79
APOEL (Cyprus)	0–4*	(Bulgaria) Spartak Pleven	0–2	0–2
Bellinzona (Switzerland)	195–217	(France) Orthez	105–109	90–108
Panionios (Greece)	166–170	(Socialist Federal Republic of Yugoslavia) Smelt Olimpija	88–73	78–97
Estudiantes Bosé (Spain)	193–146	(Portugal) Estrelas Avenida	100–71	93–75

*APOEL withdrew before the first leg and Spartak Pleven received a forfeit (2–0) in both games.

== Round of 32 ==
Team 1	Agg.	Team 2	1st leg	2nd leg
Stroitel Kyiv (Soviet Union)	188–178	(West Germany) Charlottenburg	106–93	82–85
Dinamo Tbilisi (Soviet Union)	188–189	(Greece) Olympiacos	75–96	113–93
TTL Bamberg (West Germany)	152–177	(Spain) Ram Joventut	73–94	79–83
Galatasaray (Turkey)	131–167	(Spain) CAI Zaragoza	68–72	63–95
Inter Slovnaft (Czechoslovakia)	172–195	(Israel) Hapoel Tel Aviv	80–91	92–104
Panathinaikos (Greece)	152–167	(Italy) Divarese Varese	79–76	73–91
Efes Pilsen (Turkey)	180–208	(Socialist Federal Republic of Yugoslavia) Zadar	84–123	96–85
Levski-Spartak (Bulgaria)	175–218	(Socialist Federal Republic of Yugoslavia) Partizan	96–90	79–128
Torpan Pojat (Finland)	171–220	(Italy) Philips Milano	88–90	83–130
Manchester Eagles (England)	157–166	(Belgium) Assubel Mariembourg	89–73	68–93
Tofaş (Turkey)	159–170	(Italy) Wiwa Vismara Cantù	87–84	72–86
Direktbank Den Helder (Netherlands)	168–161	(France) Racing Club de Paris	83–85	85–76
CajaCanarias (Spain)	165–169	(Belgium) Maes Pils	81–72	84–97
PAOK (Greece)	171–171*	(Socialist Federal Republic of Yugoslavia) Crvena zvezda	95–85	76–86
Spartak Pleven (Bulgaria)	178–212	(France) Orthez	95–106	83–106
Smelt Olimpija (Socialist Federal Republic of Yugoslavia)	161–162	(Spain) Estudiantes Bosé	96–70	65–92

*The game interrupted against PAOK B.C at the beginning of the extra time. PAOK'S American coach Johnny Neumann push the Italian referee Grosi, when he impute breach at jump all .

== Round of 16 ==
Key to colors
Top place in each group advance to semifinals

=== Group A ===
	Team	Pld	Pts	W	L	PF	PA	PD
1.	(Socialist Federal Republic of Yugoslavia) Partizan	6	12	6	0	536	498	+38
2.	(Italy) Divarese Varese	6	9	3	3	504	480	+24
3.	(Belgium) Assubel Mariembourg	6	8	2	4	536	575	−39
4.	(Spain) Estudiantes Bosé	6	7	1	5	505	528	−13

=== Group B ===
	Team	Pld	Pts	W	L	PF	PA	PD
1.	(Socialist Federal Republic of Yugoslavia) Zadar	6	11	5	1	544	493	+51
2.	(Spain) Ram Joventut	6	10	4	2	546	489	+57
3.	(Israel) Hapoel Tel Aviv	6	8	2	4	512	538	−26
4.	(Greece) Olympiacos	6	7	1	5	498	580	−82

=== Group C ===
	Team	Pld	Pts	W	L	PF	PA	PD
1.	(Italy) Philips Milano	6	12	6	0	577	479	+98
2.	(Socialist Federal Republic of Yugoslavia) Crvena zvezda	6	9	3	3	498	541	−43
3.	(Spain) CAI Zaragoza	6	8	2	4	506	528	−22
4.	(Belgium) Maes Pils	6	7	1	5	499	532	−33

=== Group D ===
	Team	Pld	Pts	W	L	PF	PA	PD
1.	(Italy) Wiwa Vismara Cantù	6	11	5	1	597	530	+67
2.	(Soviet Union) Stroitel Kyiv	6	10	4	2	616	554	+62
3.	(France) Orthez	6	9	3	3	569	569	0
4.	(Netherlands) Direktbank Den Helder	6	6	0	6	470	599	−129

== Semi finals ==
Team 1	Agg.	Team 2	1st leg	2nd leg
Partizan (Socialist Federal Republic of Yugoslavia)	163–147	(Socialist Federal Republic of Yugoslavia) Zadar	75–63	88–84
Wiwa Vismara Cantù (Italy)	160–151	(Italy) Philips Milano	95–81	65–70

== Finals ==
Team 1	Agg.	Team 2	1st leg	2nd leg
Wiwa Vismara Cantù (Italy)	171–177	(Socialist Federal Republic of Yugoslavia) Partizan	89–76	82–101

1988–89 FIBA Korać Cup Champions

Partizan
3rd title
