= RUS Mariembourg =

Belgian professional basketball club

Royale Union Sportive Mariembourg is a professional basketball club based in Couvin, Belgium.

== History ==
After the Second World War of 1939–45, the preferred sport for gymnasts of Union Sportive company Mariembourgeoise created in 1907 became the basketball under the influence of Albert Jossieaux. In 1949 USM applying for enrollment in the F.R.B.S.B. : A new club was born, with registration number of 475 which evolves Provincial Namur alongside Natoye, Dinant, Sombreffe ... From 1976 to 1981, RUSM went thus the first province Division to National Division I.

In the 1981–82 season the club adopted the name FIAT Mariembourg for sponsorship reasons and ranked 11th. The next season as Tuborg Mariemburg ranked 6 in the league and also reached in the semifinals of the Belgian Cup where it eliminated by Maccabi Brussels (score, 73–78).

In 1983–82 season, now Assubel Mariembourg participated in the European competitions for the first time in its history. Actually, Assubel played in the FIBA Korać Cup and eliminated in the second round by the French Olympique Antibes (82–83 home defeat, 69–76 in the Côte d'Azur). The sixth place in the Division I gave Assubel the right to play once again in the FIBA Korać Cup of the next season. In 1984–85 was the turn of Moderne to eliminate Mariembourg again in the second round (88–76 win in Counin, 78–109 defeat in Le Mans). During the 1987/1988 seasons RUS Assubel Mariembourg became runner-up of the Belgian Cup (lost to Racing Maes Pils Mechelen and to Maccabi Brussels). In 1988 the club reached to play in the quarterfinal group stage of FIBA European Cup Winner's Cup against Ram Joventut, Scavolini Pesaro and Hapoel Galil Elyon with 0–6 record. The next season played in the top 16 group stage (for second time after 1986–87) and ranked third above the Spanish club of Estudiantes Bosé (2–4 record). That was the last participation of the club in the European competitions to date.

== Honours and achievements ==
Belgian Cup

- Runners-up (2): 1986–87, 1987–88
