= JuveCaserta Basket =

Sporting Club JuveCaserta
- Leagues: Serie A2
- Founded: 1951; 75 years ago
- History: S.C. Juventus Caserta; 1951–1998; JuveCaserta Basket; 2004–2017; Sporting Club JuveCaserta; 2018–present
- Arena: PalaMaggiò
- Capacity: 6,387
- Location: Caserta, Campania, Italy
- Team colors: White and Black
- President: Nicola D’Andrea
- Ownership: Fortune Investment & Consulting (62%); Raffaele Iavazzi (28%); Caserta città del basket (10%)
- Championships: 1 Italian Championships; 1 Italian Cup
- Website: juvecaserta.it
Home	Away

Sporting Club JuveCaserta (sometimes spelled Juve Caserta), also known as Decò Caserta after its title sponsor, is an Italian professional basketball team based in Caserta, Campania. The team currently plays in the Serie A2, the second tier of Italy.

For past club sponsorship names, see sponsorship names.

== History ==
JuveCaserta was founded by a group of local enthusiasts in 1951. The name Sporting Club Juventus was chosen by Santino Piccolo, a fan of the homonymous Turin football team. The team started playing on the clay courts of the Liceo Classico Pietro Giannone.

The side played in the 1985–86 and 1986–87 finals of the first division Serie A before finally winning the competition in 1990–91, the first team from the south of Italy to do so. They had earlier won the Italian Cup in 1988 and reached the European Cup Winners' Cup final in 1989.

Following the 1997–98 season, the club went bankrupt. In 2004, two lower-level Caserta-based teams merged under the name of JuveCaserta. That side returned to the Serie A in 2008 after winning the LegaDue promotion playoffs.

The Juvecaserta logo that was introduced in 2004

Finishing in second-place in the league during the 2009–10 season, Caserta reached the playoff semi-finals but lost the series against Armani Jeans Milano 2-3. The next season saw the side lose in the EuroLeague first qualifying round to Russian team Khimki, playing instead in the Eurocup where they reached the quarterfinals where they narrowly lost to UNICS.

In July 2017, Juvecaserta Basket was excluded by CONI from the 2017–18 LBA season, due to financial issues. Vanoli Cremona was reprieved and took the place of Juvecaserta. In the 2017–18 season, the team would play in the Serie D, the fifth tier.

== Honours and titles ==
=== Domestic competitions ===
- Italian League

Winners (1): 1990–91
Runners-up (2): 1985–86, 1986–87

- Italian Cup

Winners (1): 1987–88
Runners-up (2): 1983–84, 1988–89

=== European competitions ===
- FIBA Saporta Cup

Runners-up (1): 1988–89

- FIBA Korać Cup

Runners-up (1): 1985–86
Semifinalist (1): 1986–87

- European Super Cup

3rd place (1): 1984

== Retired numbers ==
JuveCaserta Basket retired numbers
N°	Nat.	Player	Position	Tenure	Date Retired
5	(Italy)	Nando Gentile	PG	1982–1993, 2003–2004	
6	(Italy)	Vincenzo Esposito	SG	1984–1993	
18	(Brazil)	Oscar Schmidt	SF	1982–1990	1990

== Notable players ==
Note: Flags indicate national team eligibility at FIBA-sanctioned events. Players may hold other non-FIBA nationalities not displayed.

Criteria

To appear in this section a player must have either:

- Set a club record or won an individual award while at the club
- Played at least one official international match for their national team at any time
- Played at least one official NBA match at any time.

- (Italy) Davide Ancilotto 4 seasons: '91–'95
- (Italy) Sandro Dell'Agnello 8 seasons: '84–'92
- (Italy) Pietro Generali 5 seasons: '83–'88
- (Italy) Ferdinando Gentile 12 seasons: '82–'93, '03–'04
- (Italy) Vincenzo Esposito 9 seasons: '84–'93
- (The Bahamas) Mychal Thompson 1 season: '91–'92
- (Brazil) Oscar Schmidt 8 seasons: '82–'90
- (Bulgaria) Georgi Glouchkov 4 seasons: '86–'90
- (Canada) Aaron Doornekamp 3 seasons: '08–'12
- (Finland) Antti Nikkilä 1 season: '05–'06
- (Germany) Ingo Freyer 1 season: '97
- (Republic of Ireland) Jay Larrañaga 2 seasons: '07–'09
- (Israel) Guy Goodes 1 season: '97–'98
- (Israel) (United States) Richard Howell
- (United States) Cadillac Anderson 1 season: '92–'93
- (United States) Joe Arlauckas 1 season: '87–'88
- (United States) Anthony Avent 1 season: '91–'92
- (United States) Kris Clack 1 season: '05–'06
- (United States) Sean Colson 2 seasons: '04–'06
- (United States) Tellis Frank 3 seasons: '90–'93
- (United States) Dario Hunt
- (United States) Pace Mannion 1 season: '95–'96
- (United States) Bill McCaffrey 1 season: '94–'95
- (United States) BJ McKie 1 season: '06–'07
- (United States) John Mengelt 1 season: '80–'81
- (United States) Josh Powell 1 season: '04–'05
- (United States) Tom Scheffler 1 season: '87–'88
- (United States) Charles Shackleford 2 seasons: '90–'91, '93–'94
- (United States) Wayne Tinkle 1 season: '93–'94
- (United States) Bernard Toone 1 season: ??-??
- (United States) Leon Wood 1 season: '93–'94
- (United States) Galen Young 1 season: '05–'06

== Head coaches ==
- (Socialist Federal Republic of Yugoslavia) Bogdan Tanjević 4 seasons: '82–'86
- (Federal Republic of Yugoslavia) Ranko Žeravica 1 season: '93–'94
- (Italy) Andrea Trinchieri 1 season: '07–'08

== Sponsorship names ==
Throughout the years, due to sponsorship, the club has been known as :

- Juventus Caserta (no sponsorship, 1975–76 until 1978–79)
- Il Diario Caserta (1979–80)
- Latte Matese Caserta (1980–81 until 1981–82)
- Indesit Caserta (1982–83 until 1984–85)
- Mobilgirgi Caserta (1985–86 until 1986–87)
- Snaidero Caserta (1987–88 until 1988–89)
- Phonola Caserta (1989–90 until 1992–93)
- Onyx Caserta (1993–94)
- Pepsi Caserta (2000–01)
- Centro Energia Caserta (2001)
- Ellebielle Caserta (2001–02)
- Centro Energia Caserta (2002–03)
- Pepsi Caserta (2003–04 until 2007–08)
- Eldo Caserta (2008–09)
- Pepsi Caserta (2009–10 until 2010–11)
- Otto Caserta (2011–12)
- JuveCaserta (no sponsorship, 2012–13)
- Pasta Reggia Caserta (2013–14 until 2016–17)
