= RAS Maccabi Brussels =

Maccabi Brussels מכבי בריסל
- Founded: 1 November 1945; 80 years ago
- Location: Brussels, Belgium
- Team colors: Blue & white

Royale Association Sportive Maccabi Brussels (Hebrew: רויאל האיגוד הספורטיבי מכבי בריסל), founded in 1945, is a multi-sports club based in Brussels, Belgium with basketball, football, table tennis, volleyball teams.

== History ==
The Maccabi Brussels association was founded on November 1, 1945. It was originally established on January 31, 1933, but had to be restarted after some board members disappeared during World War II. In 1999, for reaching its 5th decade, it received Royal status from the Belgian federation.

== Basketball ==
Founded in 1949 by a group of young Brussels residents, Maccabi’s basketball team rose to Belgian Division 1 in 1983. The club won two Belgian Cups (1983–84 and 1987–88) and finished second in the league in 1985–86. Strong financial backing in the early 1980s helped attract coach John Van Crombruggen and key players like Cherokee Rhone, leading to notable successes including reaching European cup competitions.

In 1984, the club moved to the Palais du Midi. However, management problems in the late 1980s caused a crisis. In 1990, the club narrowly avoided losing its registration thanks to intervention by the Jewish community and regional authorities. A new committee took over and renamed it BC Maccabi.

In 1991, the club became Basket Brussels to attract broader support beyond the Jewish community. Financial troubles continued, culminating in liquidation before the 2002/03 season. Youth players then joined Royal Basket Club Bruxellois.

=== Names ===
- 1976-1983: R.A.S Maccabi Etterbeek
- 1983-1984 : R.A.S. Assumar Maccabi Etterbeek
- 1984-1986 : R.A.S. Maccabi Panasonic Brussel
- 1986-1987 : R.A.S. Orgaburo Maccabi Brussel
- 1987-1988 : R.A.S Maccabi Etterbeek
- 1988-1992 : R.A.S. Maccabi Brussel
- 1992-1996 : Basket Brussels
- 1996-1997 : Belgacom Brussels
- 1997-2002 : Atomics Brussels

=== Honours and achievements ===
Belgian League

- Runners-up (1): 1985-86

Belgian Cup

- Winners (2): 1984, 1988, 1995
- Runners-up (2): 1983, 1989
- Second division:
  - Winners (1): 1982-83

=== European participations ===
The club has competed for 9 seasons in European competitions organized by FIBA Europe from 1983 until 1999.

- Cup Winners' Cup: 4 times (1983–84, 1984–85, 1988–89, 1995-96)
- Korac Cup: 5 times (1986–87, 1987–88, 1989–90, 1990–91, 1992–93, 1998–99)

=== Notable players ===
Note: Flags indicate national team eligibility at FIBA-sanctioned events. Players may hold other non-FIBA nationalities not displayed.

Criteria

To appear in this section a player must have either:

- Set a club record or won an individual award while at the club
- Played at least one official international match for their national team at any time
- Played at least one official NBA match at any time.

- (United States) Jim Stack
- (United States) Terence Stansbury
- (Socialist Federal Republic of Yugoslavia) Slobodan Gordić

== Football ==
The Maccabi football section was created in 1953 by Holocaust survivors.
