= EuroCup Basketball records and statistics =

Map of countries, teams from which have reached the regular season of the EuroCup Basketball. Country that has been represented in the regular season Not represented

This page details statistics of the EuroCup Basketball. Unless notified these statistics concern all seasons since inception of the ULEB Cup in the 2002–03 season, including qualifying rounds of the EuroCup as per "Competition facts"; all matches before regular season count as "qualifying matches".

== General performances ==
=== By club ===
Club	Winners	Runners-up	Years won	Years runner-up
(Spain) Valencia Basket	4	2	2002–03, 2009–10, 2013–14, 2018–19	2011–12, 2016–17
(Lithuania) Rytas	2	1	2004–05, 2008–09	2006–07
(Russia) Khimki	2	1	2011–12, 2014–15	2008–09
(Russia) UNICS	1	2	2010–11	2013–14, 2020–21
(Spain) Gran Canaria	1	2	2022–23	2014–15, 2024–25
(Spain) Real Madrid	1	1	2006–07	2003–04
(Russia) Lokomotiv Kuban	1	1	2012–13	2017–18
(France) Bourg	1	1	2025–26	2023–24
(Israel) Hapoel Jerusalem	1	0	2003–04	–
(Russia) Dynamo Moscow	1	0	2005–06	–
(Spain) Joventut	1	0	2007–08	–
(Turkey) Galatasaray	1	0	2015–16	–
(Spain) Málaga	1	0	2016–17	–
(Turkey) Darüşşafaka	1	0	2017–18	–
(France) Monaco	1	0	2020–21	–
(Italy) Virtus Bologna	1	0	2021–22	–
(France) Paris	1	0	2023–24	–
(Israel) Hapoel Tel Aviv	1	0	2024–25	–
(Germany) Alba Berlin	0	2	–	2009–10, 2018–19
(Slovenia) Krka	0	1	–	2002–03
(Greece) Makedonikos	0	1	–	2004–05
(Greece) Aris	0	1	–	2005–06
(Spain) Girona	0	1	–	2007–08
(Spain) Real Betis	0	1	–	2010–11
(Spain) Bilbao	0	1	–	2012–13
(France) Strasbourg	0	1	–	2015–16
(Turkey) Bursapor	0	1	–	2021–22
(Turkey) Türk Telekom	0	1	–	2022–23
(Turkey) Beşiktaş	0	1	–	2025–26

=== By country ===
Rank	Nation	Champion	Finalist
1.	Spain	8 Valencia (4), Real Madrid (1), Joventut (1), Málaga (1), Gran Canaria (1)	7 Valencia (2), Real Madrid (1), Girona (1), Real Betis (1), Bilbao (1), Gran Canaria (1)
2.	Russia	5 Khimki (2), Dynamo Moscow (1), UNICS (1), Lokomotiv Kuban (1)	4 UNICS (2), Khimki (1), Lokomotiv Kuban (1)
3.	France	3 Bourg (1), Monaco (1), Paris (1)	2 Strasbourg (1), Bourg (1)
4.	Turkey	2 Galatasaray (1), Darüşşafaka (1)	3 Beşiktaş (1), Bursaspor (1), Türk Telekom (1)
5.	Lithuania	2 Rytas (2)	1 Rytas (1)
6.	Israel	2 Hapoel Jerusalem (1), Hapoel Tel Aviv (1)	—
7.	Italy	1 Virtus Bologna (1)	—
8.	Greece	—	2 Makedonikos (1), Aris (1)
-	Germany	—	2 Alba Berlin (2)
10.	Slovenia	—	1 Krka (1)

=== All-time top-25 EuroCup Basketball ranking ===
As of the end of the 2018–19 season.

Rank	Club	Years	Pld	W	D	L	W	RU	SF	QF
1	(Spain) Valencia	13	216	158	1	57	4	2	2	2
2	(Russia) UNICS	12	191	137	0	54	1	1	3	3
3	(Spain) Gran Canaria	12	166	108	0	58	0	1	1	3
4	(Lithuania) Rytas	11	163	96	1	66	2	1	1	2
5	(Germany) Berlin	12	174	93	1	80	0	2	0	1
6	(Israel) Hapoel Jerusalem	14	176	90	0	86	1	0	2	3
7	(Russia) Khimki	7	116	86	0	30	2	1	0	1
8	(Russia) Lokomotiv Kuban	6	110	85	0	25	1	1	2	3
9	(Serbia) Crvena zvezda	10	126	69	1	56	0	0	1	2
10	(Russia) Zenit Saint Petersburg	8	117	67	0	50	0	0	0	2
11	(Spain) Bilbao	7	97	60	0	37	0	1	2	0
12	(Montenegro) Budućnost	12	134	55	0	79	0	0	0	3
13	(France) ASVEL	9	105	54	1	50	0	0	0	2
14	(Serbia) FMP	7	84	53	0	31	0	0	2	1
15	(Greece) Aris	7	89	52	0	37	0	1	0	1
16	(Turkey) Galatasaray	7	103	50	1	52	1	0	1	0
17	(Turkey) Beşiktaş	9	97	48	1	48	0	0	0	1
18	(Serbia) Vršac	7	90	48	0	42	0	0	0	0
19	(Belgium) Spirou	11	114	48	0	66	0	0	0	1
20	(Spain) Joventut	5	71	47	1	23	1	0	1	1
21	(Czech Republic) Nymburk	8	104	46	1	57	0	0	1	2
22	(Russia) Dynamo Moscow	5	65	46	0	19	1	0	1	1
23	(Turkey) Banvit	6	86	46	0	40	0	0	1	0
24	(Germany) Bayern Munich	5	62	43	1	18	0	0	1	2
25	(Bulgaria) Academic Sofia	9	88	43	0	45	0	0	0	0

=== Participating clubs in the EuroCup ===
The following is a list of clubs that have played in or qualified for the EuroCup group stages.

Nation	No.	Clubs	Seasons
Italy (26)	11	Trento	2015–16, 2017–18, 2018–19, 2019–20, 2020–21, 2021–22, 2022–23, 2023–24, 2024–25, 2025–26, 2026–27
Italy (26)	9	Reyer Venezia	2015–16, 2019–20, 2020–21, 2021–22, 2022–23, 2023–24, 2024–25, 2025–26, 2026–27
Italy (26)	5	Treviso	2007–08, 2008–09, 2009–10, 2010–11, 2011–12
Italy (26)	4	Varese	2002–03, 2003–04, 2004–05, 2013–14
Italy (26)	4	Virtus Bologna	2003–04, 2019–20, 2020–21, 2021–22
Italy (26)	4	Cantù	2004–05, 2010–11, 2013–14, 2014–15
Italy (26)	4	Reggiana	2005–06, 2014–15, 2015–16, 2017–18
Italy (26)	4	Brescia	2018–19, 2019–20, 2020–21, 2022–23
Italy (26)	3	Virtus Roma	2005–06, 2013–14, 2014–15
Italy (26)	2	Amatori Udine	2002–03, 2006–07
Italy (26)	2	Fortitudo Bologna	2007–08, 2008–09
Italy (26)	2	Dinamo Sassari	2012–13, 2013–14
Italy (26)	2	Torino	2017–18, 2018–19
Italy (26)	1	Roseto	2002–03
Italy (26)	1	Trieste	2002–03
Italy (26)	1	Olimpia Milano	2003–04
Italy (26)	1	Napoli (1946)	2004–05
Italy (26)	1	Mens Sana	2006–07
Italy (26)	1	Biella	2009–10
Italy (26)	1	Teramo	2009–10
Italy (26)	1	Juvecaserta	2010–11
Italy (26)	1	Brindisi	2015–16
Italy (26)	1	Derthona	2026–27
Italy (26)	1	Maxima Roma	2026–27
Italy (26)	1	Napoli (2016)	2026–27
Italy (26)	1	Roma	2026–27
Spain (18)	17	Gran Canaria	2003–04, 2004–05, 2006–07, 2007–08, 2008–09, 2009–10, 2010–11, 2011–12, 2014–15, 2015–16, 2016–17, 2017–18, 2020–21, 2021–22, 2022–23, 2023–24, 2024–25
Spain (18)	13	Valencia	2002–03, 2004–05, 2007–08, 2008–09, 2009–10, 2011–12, 2012–13, 2013–14, 2015–16, 2016–17, 2018–19, 2021–22, 2024–25
Spain (18)	11	Joventut	2002–03, 2003–04, 2004–05, 2007–08, 2009–10, 2019–20, 2020–21, 2021–22, 2022–23, 2023–24, 2024–25
Spain (18)	7	Bilbao	2008–09, 2009–10, 2012–13, 2013–14, 2015–16, 2016–17, 2017–18
Spain (18)	5	Andorra	2017–18, 2018–19, 2019–20, 2020–21, 2021–22
Spain (18)	4	Estudiantes	2002–03, 2003–04, 2005–06, 2010–11
Spain (18)	4	Málaga	2016–17, 2018–19, 2019–20, 2020–21
Spain (18)	3	Real Betis	2010–11, 2012–13, 2014–15
Spain (18)	3	Zaragoza	2013–14, 2014–15, 2015–16
Spain (18)	2	Lleida	2002–03, 2003–04
Spain (18)	2	Fuenlabrada	2002–03, 2016–17
Spain (18)	2	Lucentum	2003–04, 2005–06
Spain (18)	2	Real Madrid	2003–04, 2006–07
Spain (18)	2	Manresa	2025–26, 2026–27
Spain (18)	1	Girona	2007–08
Spain (18)	1	Murcia	2016–17
Spain (18)	1	Canarias	2026–27
Spain (18)	1	San Pablo Burgos	2026–27
France (18)	10	Le Mans	2003–04, 2004–05, 2005–06, 2009–10, 2010–11, 2011–12, 2012–13, 2013–14, 2015–16, 2026–27
France (18)	9	ASVEL	2005–06, 2007–08, 2008–09, 2010–11, 2011–12, 2013–14, 2014–15, 2017–18, 2018–19
France (18)	7	Bourg	2020–21, 2021–22, 2022–23, 2023–24, 2024–25, 2025–26, 2026–27
France (18)	6	Cholet	2002–03, 2003–04, 2004–05, 2009–10, 2011–12, 2012–13
France (18)	5	Gravelines	2002–03, 2003–04, 2004–05, 2011–12, 2013–14
France (18)	5	Nancy	2006–07, 2007–08, 2009–10, 2014–15, 2015–16
France (18)	5	Metropolitans	2013–14, 2014–15, 2017–18, 2020–21, 2021–22
France (18)	4	Élan Chalon	2002–03, 2004–05, 2007–08, 2013–14
France (18)	4	Monaco	2018–19, 2019–20, 2020–21, 2026–27
France (18)	3	Strasbourg	2006–07, 2007–08, 2014–15
France (18)	3	Nanterre 92	2015–16, 2019–20, 2020–21
France (18)	3	Limoges	2017–18, 2018–19, 2019–20
France (18)	2	Roanne	2008–09, 2010–11
France (18)	2	Paris	2022–23, 2023–24
France (18)	1	Pau-Lacq-Orthez	2007–08
France (18)	1	Le Havre	2008–09
France (18)	1	Orléans	2012–13
France (18)	1	Dijon	2014–15
Germany (16)	14	Ulm	2012–13, 2013–14, 2015–16, 2016–17, 2017–18, 2018–19, 2019–20, 2020–21, 2021–22, 2022–23, 2023–24, 2024–25, 2025–26, 2026–27
Germany (16)	12	Berlin	2004–05, 2005–06, 2006–07, 2007–08, 2009–10, 2010–11, 2011–12, 2013–14, 2015–16, 2016–17, 2017–18, 2018–19
Germany (16)	7	Bonn	2002–03, 2003–04, 2004–05, 2009–10, 2013–14, 2014–15, 2015–16
Germany (16)	7	Skyliners Frankfurt	2002–03, 2003–04, 2005–06, 2007–08, 2011–12, 2018–19, 2026–27
Germany (16)	5	Bamberg	2004–05, 2006–07, 2008–09, 2009–10, 2014–15
Germany (16)	5	Artland Dragons	2007–08, 2008–09, 2012–13, 2013–14, 2014–15
Germany (16)	5	Oldenburg	2010–11, 2013–14, 2014–15, 2015–16, 2019–20
Germany (16)	5	Hamburg Towers	2021–22, 2022–23, 2023–24, 2024–25, 2025–26
Germany (16)	4	Köln	2002–03, 2003–04, 2004–05, 2007–08
Germany (16)	3	Bayern Munich	2011–12, 2016–17, 2017–18
Germany (16)	2	Ludwigsburg	2007–08, 2015–16
Germany (16)	2	Chemnitz	2025–26, 2026–27
Germany (16)	1	Braunschweig	2003–04
Germany (16)	1	Göttingen	2010–11
Germany (16)	1	Würzburg	2012–13
Germany (16)	1	Rostock Seawolves	2026–27
Russia (11)	13	UNICS	2005–06, 2006–07, 2007–08, 2008–09, 2009–10, 2010–11, 2012–13, 2013–14, 2015–16, 2017–18, 2018–19, 2019–20, 2020–21
Russia (11)	9	Lokomotiv Kuban	2011–12, 2012–13, 2014–15, 2016–17, 2017–18, 2018–19, 2019–20, 2020–21, 2021–22
Russia (11)	8	Zenit Saint Petersburg	2007–08, 2009–10, 2012–13, 2014–15, 2015–16, 2016–17, 2017–18, 2018–19
Russia (11)	7	Khimki	2006–07, 2007–08, 2008–09, 2011–12, 2013–14, 2014–15, 2016–17
Russia (11)	5	Dynamo Moscow	2004–05, 2005–06, 2007–08, 2008–09, 2009–10
Russia (11)	4	Spartak Saint Petersburg	2009–10, 2011–12, 2012–13, 2013–14
Russia (11)	3	Nizhny Novgorod	2013–14, 2015–16, 2016–17
Russia (11)	2	Krasny Oktyabr	2014–15, 2015–16
Russia (11)	1	Ural Great	2002–03
Russia (11)	1	Krasnye Krylia	2010–11
Russia (11)	1	Avtodor Saratov	2015–16
Turkey (11)	12	Beşiktaş	2005–06, 2006–07, 2007–08, 2008–09, 2009–10, 2010–11, 2013–14, 2014–15, 2015–16, 2023–24, 2024–25, 2025–26
Turkey (11)	11	Türk Telekom	2004–05, 2007–08, 2008–09, 2009–10, 2018–19, 2021–22, 2022–23, 2023–24, 2024–25, 2025–26, 2026–27
Turkey (11)	8	Galatasaray	2007–08, 2009–10, 2010–11, 2012–13, 2015–16, 2017–18, 2018–19, 2019–20
Turkey (11)	6	Banvit	2010–11, 2011–12, 2012–13, 2013–14, 2014–15, 2015–16
Turkey (11)	4	Darüşşafaka	2002–03, 2004–05, 2017–18, 2019–20
Turkey (11)	4	Tofaş	2017–18, 2018–19, 2019–20, 2026–27
Turkey (11)	4	Bahçeşehir Koleji	2020–21, 2024–25, 2025–26, 2026–27
Turkey (11)	3	Bursaspor	2020–21, 2021–22, 2022–23
Turkey (11)	2	Karşıyaka	2013–14, 2014–15
Turkey (11)	1	TED Ankara Kolejliler	2013–14
Turkey (11)	1	Trabzonspor	2015–16
Greece (9)	11	Aris	2004–05, 2005–06, 2008–09, 2009–10, 2010–11, 2011–12, 2015–16, 2023–24, 2024–25, 2025–26, 2026–27
Greece (9)	8	PAOK	2004–05, 2006–07, 2010–11, 2011–12, 2013–14, 2014–15, 2015–16, 2026–27
Greece (9)	5	Panionios	2005–06, 2007–08, 2012–13, 2013–14, 2025–26
Greece (9)	4	Pannelinios	2007–08, 2008–09, 2009–10, 2010–11
Greece (9)	4	Promitheas	2019–20, 2020–21, 2021–22, 2022–23
Greece (9)	2	Makedonikos	2003–04, 2004–05
Greece (9)	2	Maroussi	2004–05, 2008–09
Greece (9)	2	AEK Athens	2006–07, 2015–16
Greece (9)	1	Ionikos	2003–04
Belgium (7)	11	Spirou	2002–03, 2003–04, 2004–05, 2005–06, 2007–08, 2008–09, 2009–10, 2012–13, 2013–14, 2014–15, 2015–16
Belgium (7)	8	Oostende	2002–03, 2004–05, 2006–07, 2007–08, 2011–12, 2012–13, 2013–14, 2014–15
Belgium (7)	3	Mons-Hainaut	2006–07, 2011–12, 2013–14
Belgium (7)	2	Antwerp Giants	2007–08, 2020–21
Belgium (7)	1	Verviers-Pepinster	2003–04
Belgium (7)	1	Liège	2004–05
Belgium (7)	1	Bree	2005–06
Israel (7)	17	Hapoel Jerusalem	2003–04, 2004–05, 2005–06, 2006–07, 2007–08, 2009–10, 2010–11, 2011–12, 2012–13, 2013–14, 2014–15, 2015–16, 2016–17, 2017–18, 2024–25, 2025–26, 2026–27
Israel (7)	3	Hapoel Tel Aviv	2022–23, 2023–24, 2024–25
Israel (7)	1	Hapoel Galil Elyon	2007–08
Israel (7)	1	Bnei HaSharon	2008–09
Israel (7)	1	Hapoel Gilboa Galil	2010–11
Israel (7)	1	Maccabi Haifa	2013–14
Israel (7)	1	Maccabi Rishon LeZion	2019–20
Serbia (6)	8	Crvena zvezda	2003–04, 2004–05, 2005–06, 2006–07, 2007–08, 2009–10, 2012–13, 2018–19
Serbia (6)	7	Hemofarm	2004–05, 2005–06, 2006–07, 2007–08, 2008–09, 2009–10, 2010–11
Serbia (6)	6	FMP	2002–03, 2003–04, 2004–05, 2005–06, 2006–07, 2007–08
Serbia (6)	6	Partizan	2014–15, 2017–18, 2018–19, 2019–20, 2020–21, 2021–22
Serbia (6)	1	Atlas	2003–04
Serbia (6)	1	Radnički	2013–14
Lithuania (6)	12	Rytas	2003–04, 2004–05, 2006–07, 2008–09, 2009–10, 2011–12, 2014–15, 2015–16, 2016–17, 2017–18, 2018–19, 2019–20
Lithuania (6)	9	Lietkabelis	2016–17, 2017–18, 2020–21, 2021–22, 2022–23, 2023–24, 2024–25, 2025–26, 2026–27
Lithuania (6)	4	Šiauliai	2007–08, 2009–10, 2010–11, 2026–27
Lithuania (6)	4	Neptūnas	2013–14, 2015–16, 2025–26, 2026–27
Lithuania (6)	2	Prienai	2011–12, 2012–13
Lithuania (6)	2	Wolves	2023–24, 2024–25
Poland (6)	7	Śląsk Wrocław	2004–05, 2007–08, 2021–22, 2022–23, 2023–24, 2025–26, 2026–27
Poland (6)	4	Włocławek	2005–06, 2006–07, 2007–08, 2010–11
Poland (6)	4	Turów Zgorzelec	2007–08, 2008–09, 2009–10, 2011–12
Poland (6)	3	Gdynia	2003–04, 2018–19, 2019–20
Poland (6)	2	Zielona Góra	2012–13, 2014–15
Poland (6)	2	Trefl Sopot	2012–13, 2024–25
Ukraine (6)	6	Azovmash	2007–08, 2008–09, 2009–10, 2010–11, 2011–12, 2012–13
Ukraine (6)	2	Budivelnyk	2010–11, 2012–13
Ukraine (6)	2	Donetsk	2011–12, 2012–13
Ukraine (6)	2	Prometey	2022–23, 2023–24
Ukraine (6)	1	Kyiv	2007–08
Ukraine (6)	1	Khimik	2013–14
Croatia (5)	6	Zadar	2002–03, 2003–04, 2004–05, 2007–08, 2008–09, 2009–10
Croatia (5)	6	Cedevita	2010–11, 2011–12, 2013–14, 2016–17, 2017–18, 2018–19
Croatia (5)	3	Cibona	2011–12, 2012–13, 2013–14
Croatia (5)	1	Split	2003–04
Croatia (5)	1	Zagreb	2003–04
Latvia (5)	7	Ventspils	2003–04, 2004–05, 2005–06, 2006–07, 2007–08, 2009–10, 2014–15
Latvia (5)	5	VEF Rīga	2010–11, 2011–12, 2012–13, 2013–14, 2014–15
Latvia (5)	2	ASK Rīga	2007–08, 2008–09
Latvia (5)	1	Barons	2008–09
Latvia (5)	1	Rīgas Zeļļi	2026–27
Slovenia (4)	8	Cedevita Olimpija	2019–20, 2020–21, 2021–22, 2022–23, 2023–24, 2024–25, 2025–26, 2026–27
Slovenia (4)	3	Olimpija	2013–14, 2014–15, 2016–17
Slovenia (4)	2	Zlatorog Laško	2002–03, 2004–05
Slovenia (4)	2	Krka	2002–03, 2011–12
Netherlands (4)	4	Donar	2004–05, 2007–08, 2010–11, 2011–12
Netherlands (4)	3	Amsterdam	2002–03, 2003–04, 2005–06
Netherlands (4)	2	EiffelTowers Nijmegen	2003–04, 2004–05
Netherlands (4)	2	EBBC Den Bosch	2006–07, 2007–08
Romania (3)	5	U-BT Cluj-Napoca	2022–23, 2023–24, 2024–25, 2025–26, 2026–27
Romania (3)	3	Ploiești	2007–08, 2013–14, 2014–15
Romania (3)	1	Steaua București	2015–16
United Kingdom (3)	4	London Lions	2022–23, 2023–24, 2025–26, 2026–27
United Kingdom (3)	1	Brighton Bears	2003–04
United Kingdom (3)	1	Guildford Heat	2007–08
Portugal (3)	2	Queluz	2004–05, 2005–06
Portugal (3)	2	Ovarense	2004–05, 2007–08
Portugal (3)	1	Benfica	2004–05
Hungary (3)	2	Szolnoki Olaj	2014–15, 2015–16
Hungary (3)	1	Debreceni Vadkakasok	2004–05
Hungary (3)	1	Alba Fehérvár	2013–14
Montenegro (2)	20	Budućnost	2003–04, 2004–05, 2007–08, 2008–09, 2010–11, 2011–12, 2012–13, 2013–14, 2014–15, 2015–16, 2016–17, 2017–18, 2019–20, 2020–21, 2021–22, 2022–23, 2023–24, 2024–25, 2025–26, 2026–27
Montenegro (2)	2	Mornar	2018–19, 2020–21
Bulgaria (2)	9	Academic Sofia	2003–04, 2004–05, 2005–06, 2006–07, 2007–08, 2008–09, 2011–12, 2012–13, 2013–14
Bulgaria (2)	1	Balkan Botevgrad	2026–27
Austria (2)	2	Kapfenberg Bulls	2003–04, 2004–05
Austria (2)	1	Swans Gmunden	2007–08
Bosnia and Herzegovina (2)	2	Bosna	2007–08, 2026–27
Bosnia and Herzegovina (2)	1	Igokea	2013–14
Czech Republic (1)	8	Nymburk	2007–08, 2008–09, 2009–10, 2010–11, 2011–12, 2012–13, 2013–14, 2014–15
Estonia (1)	2	Kalev	2007–08, 2013–14
North Macedonia (1)	2	MZT Skopje	2013–14, 2016–17
Switzerland (1)	1	Fribourg Olympic	2007–08
Finland (1)	1	Bisons Loimaa	2013–14

== Clubs ==
=== Semi-final appearances ===
Club	No.	Years
(Spain) Valencia	10	**2003**, 2005, **2010**, **2012**, 2013, **2014**, **2017**, **2019**, 2022, 2025
(Russia) UNICS	5	2007, **2011**, **2014**, 2015, 2019
(Lithuania) Rytas	4	**2005**, **2007**, **2009**, 2012
(Spain) Gran Canaria	4	**2015**, 2016, **2023**, **2025**
(Israel) Hapoel Jerusalem	3	**2004**, 2006, 2017
(Serbia) Hemofarm	3	2005, 2006, 2009
(Spain) Bilbao	3	2009, 2010, **2013**
(Russia) Khimki	3	**2009**, **2012**, **2015**
(Russia) Lokomotiv Kuban	3	2013, 2017, **2018**
(Spain) Joventut	3	2003, **2008**, 2023
(Turkey) Galatasaray	2	2008, **2016**
(Spain) Real Madrid	2	**2004**, **2007**
(Spain) Estudiantes	2	2003, 2004
(Serbia) FMP	2	2004, 2007
(Russia) Dynamo Moscow	2	**2006**, 2008
(Germany) Alba Berlin	2	**2010**, **2019**
Andorra	2	2019, 2022
(Italy) Virtus Bologna	2	2021, **2022**
(Turkey) Türk Telekom	2	**2023**, 2026
(France) Bourg	2	**2024**, **2026**
(Turkey) Beşiktaş	2	2024, **2026**
(Turkey) Bahçeşehir Koleji	2	2025, 2026
(Spain) Girona	1	**2008**
(Slovenia) Krka	1	**2003**
(Greece) Makedonikos	1	**2005**
(Greece) Panellinios	1	2010
(Greece) Aris	1	**2006**
(Spain) Real Betis	1	**2011**
(Italy) Treviso	1	2011
(Croatia) Cedevita	1	2011
(Russia) Spartak St. Petersburg	1	2012
(Ukraine) Budivelnyk	1	2013
(Serbia) Crvena zvezda	1	2014
(Russia) Nizhny Novgorod	1	2014
(Turkey) Banvit	1	2015
(Italy) Aquila Trento	1	2016
(France) Strasbourg	1	**2016**
(Spain) Málaga	1	**2017**
(Italy) Reggiana	1	2018
(Germany) Bayern Munich	1	2018
(Turkey) Darüşşafaka	1	**2018**
(Turkey) Bursaspor	1	**2022**
(Ukraine) Prometey	1	2023
(France) Paris	1	**2024**
(United Kingdom) London Lions	1	2024
(Israel) Hapoel Tel Aviv	1	**2025**

Team in Bold:	Finalist team in season

=== Overall appearances ===
Seasons	Clubs
19	**Budućnost**
17	Gran Canaria
16	**Hapoel Jerusalem**
14	UNICS, Valencia
13	**Ulm**
12	Rytas, Alba Berlin, **Beşiktaş**
11	Spirou Charleroi, Joventut Badalona
10	Crvena zvezda, **Aris**, **Türk Telekom**, **Aquila Basket Trento**
9	PBC Academic, Le Mans, ASVEL, Lokomotiv Kuban
8	Oostende, Galatasaray, Nymburk, **Reyer Venezia**, **Lietkabelis**
7	Telekom Baskets Bonn, KK FMP, PAOK, Ventspils, Vršac, Khimki, Bilbao Basket, Cedevita, **Cedevita Olimpija**
6	Skyliners Frankfurt, Zadar, Cholet Basket, Bamberg, MBC Mariupol, Bandırma, Partizan, **JL Bourg**, **Śląsk Wrocław**
5	Gravelines-Dunkerque, Dynamo Moscow, Nancy Basket, SIG Strasbourg, Pallacanestro Treviso, Artland Dragons, Turów Zgorzelec, Baskets Oldenburg, VEF Rīga, Bayern Munich, Metropolitans 92, Zenit Saint Petersburg, Limoges, Andorra, **Hamburg Towers**, **Panionios**
4	Estudiantes, RheinStars Köln, Élan Chalon, Darüşşafaka, Pallacanestro Varese, Virtus Bologna, Donar Groningen, Cantù, Reggiana, Włocławek, Panellinios, Spartak Saint Petersburg, Zielona Góra, Dinamo Sassari, Olimpija Ljubljana, Nanterre 92, Málaga, Brescia, Promitheas Patras, **U-BT Cluj-Napoca** , **Neptūnas**
3	Amsterdam Basketball, Arka Gdynia, Virtus Roma, Belfius Mons-Hainaut, Šiauliai, CSU Ploiești, Triumph Lyubertsy, Budivelnyk, Real Betis, Cibona, Zaragoza, Karşıyaka, Nizhny Novgorod, Tofaş, Monaco, Bursaspor, Hapoel Tel Aviv, **Bahçeşehir Koleji**, **London Lions**
2	Pallalcesto Amatori Udine, Fuenlabrada, Zlatorog Laško, Krka, Lleida Bàsquet, Olimpia Milano, Real Madrid, Kapfenberg Bulls, Lucentum Alicante, Makedonikos, EiffelTowers Nijmegen, Maroussi, Queluz, Ovarense, AEK, Siena, Heroes Den Bosch, Antwerp Giants, Fortitudo Bologna, Ludwigsburg, Kalev, ASK Riga, Chorale Roanne, Donetsk, Prienai, MZT Skopje, Szolnoki Olajbányász, Krasny Oktyabr, Auxilium Pallacanestro Torino, Mornar Bar, BC Prometey, Paris Basketball, Wolves, Trefl Sopot
1	Ural Great Perm, Roseto Sharks, Trieste, Zagreb, Atlas, Pepinster, Löwen Braunschweig, Brighton Bears, Split, Ionikos Neas Filadelfias, Debreceni Vadkakasok, Liège Basket, Basket Napoli, Benfica, Bree, Bosna, Surrey Scorchers, Sant Josep Girona, Swans Gmunden, Hapoel Galil Elyon, Fribourg Olympic, BC Kyiv, Élan Béarnais, Barons, STB Le Havre, Bnei Herzliya, Teramo Basket, Pallacanestro Biella, Göttingen, Hapoel Gilboa Galil, JuveCaserta, Krasnye Krylia, Würzburg Baskets, Orléans Loiret, Igokea, BC Khimik, Ankara Kolejliler, Alba Fehérvár, Maccabi Haifa, Bisons Loimaa, Radnički Kragujevac, JDA Dijon, Brindisi, Trabzonspor, Steaua București, Avtodor Saratov, Maccabi Tel Aviv, Maccabi Rishon LeZion, UCAM, **Bàsquet Manresa** , **Niners Chemnitz**
