= Spanish basketball clubs in international competitions =

Spanish basketball clubs in European and worldwide competitions is a compilation of the results of clubs from Spain's national top-tier level men's professional basketball league, the Liga ACB, in official international competitions.

== History ==
1960s–1970s

In 1964, Real Madrid became the first Spanish club to win the European Champions Cup, marking the start of Spain’s continental dominance. In 1965, Madrid defended the crown, showing early consistency. By 1967, they added another trophy, and in 1968 they repeated the success. Their 1974 title confirmed their dynasty, while the 1978 triumph gave them six crowns in just 14 years. In 1979, Joventut Badalona made history by winning the FIBA Korać Cup, the first major European trophy for a Spanish team outside Madrid. This moment showed Spanish basketball power was spreading, and in 1980 Madrid lifted yet another Champions Cup.

1980s

In 1981, Real Madrid defended their crown, cementing dominance. By 1984, Madrid captured the Saporta Cup, diversifying their collection of European trophies. FC Barcelona entered the European winners’ circle in 1986 by claiming the Korać Cup . Real Madrid responded by lifting the Saporta Cup in 1988, then repeated the feat in 1989. Spanish clubs were now consistently making noise in multiple competitions.

1990s

In 1992, Real Madrid again triumphed in the Saporta Cup, keeping Spain in the European spotlight. The 1994 season produced a historic breakthrough when Joventut Badalona shocked Europe by winning the EuroLeague. They became the first Spanish club besides Madrid to win the most prestigious crown. Real Madrid followed up with a EuroLeague triumph in 1995, giving Spain back-to-back champions from different clubs. Madrid added another Saporta Cup in 1997, while in 1999 Barcelona claimed the same trophy. By the end of the decade, Spain had multiple European-winning clubs, not just one dynasty.

2000s

The new millennium saw Barcelona finally capture its long-awaited EuroLeague in 2003, a major milestone. That same year, Valencia Basket celebrated their first continental success with the ULEB Cup (now known as EuroCup). In 2007, Real Madrid proved versatile by winning the EuroCup as well. Joventut Badalona added more glory by capturing the EuroCup in 2008. By the end of the decade, Spanish clubs were winning across both EuroLeague and EuroCup consistently.

2010s

In 2010, FC Barcelona secured their second EuroLeague crown. That same year, Valencia Basket lifted their second EuroCup. Real Madrid returned to EuroLeague dominance in 2015, earning their ninth title. In 2017, Unicaja Málaga won their first EuroCup, adding southern Spain to the list of European winners. Real Madrid reclaimed the EuroLeague in 2018 for their tenth triumph. Valencia once again ruled the EuroCup in 2019, reinforcing their reputation as specialists in the competition.

2020s

The new decade brought fresh champions. In 2020, San Pablo Burgos stunned Europe by winning the Basketball Champions League (BCL). They successfully defended the crown in 2021, giving Spain another dominant team. Lenovo Tenerife, who had won the BCL in 2017, added a second crown in 2022. Real Madrid once again won its eleventh EuroLeague title in 2023, adding to their historical collection. That same year, Gran Canaria lifted the EuroCup for the first time but later, the team did not admit to the EuroLeague in the following season due financial problems. Màlaga won the Basketball Champions League back-to-back titles in 2024 and 2025

== Appearances in European finals ==
Season	Champion	Result	Runner-up	Date	Venue	
FIBA European Champions Cup & EuroLeague (1st tier)
1961–62	Dinamo Tbilisi (Soviet Union)	90–83	(Spain) Real Madrid	29/06/1962	Patinoire des Vernets, Geneva	
1962–63	CSKA Moscow (Soviet Union)	259–240 (three-leg)	(Spain) Real Madrid	23/07, 31/07 & 01/08/1963	Frontón Vista Alegre, Madrid	Lenin Palace of Sports, Moscow
1963–64	Real Madrid (Spain)	183–174 (two-leg)	(Czechoslovakia) Spartak ZJŠ Brno	29/04 & 10/05/1964	Brno Ice Rink	Frontón Vista Alegre, Madrid
1964–65	Real Madrid (Spain)	157–150 (two-leg)	(Soviet Union) CSKA Moscow	08/04 & 13/04/1965	Lenin Palace of Sports, Moscow	Frontón Vista Alegre, Madrid
1966–67	Real Madrid (Spain)	91–83	(Italy) Simmenthal Milano	01/04/1967	Sports City of Real Madrid Pavilion, Madrid	
1967–68	Real Madrid (Spain)	98–95	(Czechoslovakia) Spartak ZJŠ Brno	11/04/1968	Palais des Sports de Gerland, Lyon	
1968–69	CSKA Moscow (Soviet Union)	103–99	(Spain) Real Madrid	24/04/1969	Palau dels Esports, Barcelona	
1973–74	Real Madrid (Spain)	84–82	(Italy) Ignis Varese	03/04/1974	Palais des Sports de Beaulieu, Nantes	
1974–75	Ignis Varese (Italy)	79–66	(Spain) Real Madrid	10/04/1975	Arena Deurne, Antwerp	
1975–76	Mobilgirgi Varese (Italy)	81–74	(Spain) Real Madrid	01/04/1976	Patinoire des Vernets, Geneva	
1977–78	Real Madrid (Spain)	75–67	(Italy) Mobilgirgi Varese	06/04/1978	Olympiahalle, Munich	
1979–80	Real Madrid (Spain)	89–85	(Israel) Maccabi Tel Aviv	27/03/1980	Deutschlandhalle, West Berlin	
1983–84	Banco Roma (Italy)	79–73	(Spain) FC Barcelona	29/03/1984	Patinoire des Vernets, Geneva	
1984–85	Cibona (Socialist Federal Republic of Yugoslavia)	87–78	(Spain) Real Madrid	03/04/1985	Peace and Friendship Stadium, Piraeus	
1989–90	Jugoplastika (Socialist Federal Republic of Yugoslavia)	72–67	(Spain) FC Barcelona Banca Catalana	19/04/1990	Pabellón Príncipe Felipe, Zaragoza	
1990–91	POP 84 (Socialist Federal Republic of Yugoslavia)	70–65	(Spain) FC Barcelona Banca Catalana	18/04/1991	Palais Omnisports de Paris-Bercy, Paris	
1991–92	Partizan (Federal Republic of Yugoslavia)	71–70	(Spain) Montigalà Joventut	16/04/1992	Abdi İpekçi Arena, Istanbul	
1993–94	7up Joventut (Spain)	59–57	(Greece) Olympiacos	21/04/1994	Yad Eliyahu Arena, Tel Aviv	
1994–95	Real Madrid Teka (Spain)	73–61	(Greece) Olympiacos	13/04/1995	Pabellón Príncipe Felipe, Zaragoza	
1995–96	Panathinaikos (Greece)	67–66	(Spain) FC Barcelona Banca Catalana	11/04/1996	Palais Omnisports de Paris-Bercy, Paris	
1996–97	Olympiacos (Greece)	73–58	(Spain) FC Barcelona Banca Catalana	24/04/1997	Palaeur, Rome	
2000–01	Kinder Bologna (Italy)	3 – 2 Play-off	(Spain) Tau Cerámica	17/04 to 10/05/2001	PalaMalaguti, Casalecchio di Reno	Pabellón Araba, Vitoria-Gasteiz
2002–03	FC Barcelona (Spain)	76–65	(Italy) Benetton Treviso	11/05/2003	Palau Sant Jordi, Barcelona	
2004–05	Maccabi Tel Aviv (Israel)	90–78	(Spain) Tau Cerámica	08/05/2005	Olimpiisky Arena, Moscow	
2009–10	Regal FC Barcelona (Spain)	86–68	(Greece) Olympiacos	09/05/2010	Palais Omnisports de Paris-Bercy, Paris	
2012–13	Olympiacos (Greece)	100–88	(Spain) Real Madrid	12/05/2013	The O2 Arena, London	
2013–14	Maccabi Tel Aviv (Israel)	98–86	(Spain) Real Madrid	18/05/2014	Mediolanum Forum, Milan	
2014–15	Real Madrid (Spain)	78–59	(Greece) Olympiacos	17/05/2015	Barclaycard Center, Madrid	
2017–18	Real Madrid (Spain)	85–80	(Turkey) Fenerbahçe Doğuş	20/05/2018	Štark Arena, Belgrade	
2020–21	Anadolu Efes (Turkey)	86–81	(Spain) FC Barcelona	30/05/2021	Lanxess Arena, Cologne	
2021–22	Anadolu Efes (Turkey)	58–57	(Spain) Real Madrid	21/05/2022	Stark Arena, Belgrade	
2022–23	Real Madrid (Spain)	79–78	(Greece) Olympiacos	21/05/2023	Žalgiris Arena, Kaunas	
2023–24	Fenerbahçe Beko (Turkey)	95–80	(Spain) Real Madrid	26/05/2022	Uber Arena, Berlin	
2025–26	Olympiacos (Greece)	92–85	(Spain) Real Madrid	24/05/2022	Telekom Center, Athens	
FIBA Saporta Cup (2nd tier)
1980–81	Squibb Cantù (Italy)	86–82	(Spain) FC Barcelona	18/03/1981	Palaeur, Rome	
1981–82	Cibona (Socialist Federal Republic of Yugoslavia)	96–95	(Spain) Real Madrid	16/03/1982	Salle Henri Simonet, Brussels	
1983–84	Real Madrid (Spain)	82–81	(Italy) Simac Milano	14/03/1983	Stedelijk Sportcentrum, Ostend	
1984–85	FC Barcelona (Spain)	77–73	(Soviet Union) Žalgiris	19/03/1985	Palais des Sports, Grenoble	
1985–86	FC Barcelona (Spain)	101–86	(Italy) Scavolini Pesaro	18/03/1986	PalaMaggiò, Caserta	
1987–88	Limoges CSP (France)	96–89	(Spain) Ram Joventut	16/03/1988	Palais des Sports, Grenoble	
1988–89	Real Madrid (Spain)	117–113	(Italy) Snaidero Caserta	14/03/1989	Peace and Friendship Stadium, Piraeus	
1989–90	Knorr Bologna (Italy)	79–74	(Spain) Real Madrid	13/03/1990	PalaGiglio, Florence	
1990–91	PAOK (Greece)	76–72	(Spain) CAI Zaragoza	26/03/1991	Patinoire de Vernets, Geneva	
1991–92	Real Madrid Asegurator (Spain)	65–63	(Greece) PAOK	17/03/1992	Palais des Sports de Beaulieu, Nantes	
1993–94	Smelt Olimpija (Slovenia)	91–81	(Spain) Taugrés	15/03/1994	Centre Intercommunal de Glace Malley, Lausanne	
1994–95	Benetton Treviso (Italy)	94–86	(Spain) Taugrés	14/03/1995	Abdi İpekçi Arena, Istanbul	
1995–96	Taugrés (Spain)	88–81	(Greece) PAOK	12/03/1996	Pabellón Araba, Vitoria-Gasteiz	
1996–97	Real Madrid Teka (Spain)	78–64	(Italy) Riello Mash Verona	15/04/1997	Eleftheria Indoor Hall, Nicosia	
1998–99	Benetton Treviso (Italy)	64–60	(Spain) Pamesa Valencia	14/04/1999	Pabellón Príncipe Felipe, Zaragoza	
2001–02	Montepaschi Siena (Italy)	81–71	(Spain) Pamesa Valencia	30/04/2002	Palais des Sports de Gerland, Lyon	
EuroCup Basketball (2nd tier)
2002–03	Pamesa Valencia (Spain)	168–154 (two-leg)	(Slovenia) Krka	15 & 24/04/2003	ŠD Leona Štuklja, Krka	... Font de San Lluís, Valencia
2003–04	Hapoel Migdal (Israel)	83–72	(Spain) Real Madrid	13/04/2004	Spiroudome, Charleroi	
2006–07	Real Madrid (Spain)	87–75	(Lithuania) Lietuvos rytas	10/04/2007	Spiroudome, Charleroi	
2007–08	DKV Joventut (Spain)	79–54	(Spain) Akasvayu Girona	13/04/2008	Palavela, Turin	
2009–10	Power Elect. Valencia (Spain)	67–44	(Germany) Alba Berlin	18/04/2010	Fernando Buesa Arena, Vitoria-Gasteiz	
2010–11	UNICS (Russia)	92–77	(Spain) Cajasol	17/04/2011	PalaVerde, Treviso	
2011–12	Khimki (Russia)	77–68	(Spain) Valencia Basket	15/04/2012	Basketball Center, Khimki	
2012–13	Lokomotiv-Kuban (Russia)	75–64	(Spain) Uxúe Bilbao Basket	13/04/2013	RTL Spiroudome, Charleroi	
2013–14	Valencia Basket (Spain)	165–140 (two-leg)	(Russia) UNICS	01 & 07/05/2014	... Font de San Lluís, Valencia	Basket-Hall, Kazan
2014–15	Khimki (Russia)	174–130 (two-leg)	(Spain) Herbalife Gran Canaria	24 & 29/04/2014	Gran Canaria Arena, Las Palmas	Basketball Center, Khimki
2016–17	Unicaja (Spain)	2 – 1 Play-off	(Spain) Valencia Basket	28, 31/03 & 05/04/2017	... Font de San Lluís, Valencia	Palacio de Deportes..., Málaga
2018–19	Valencia Basket (Spain)	2 – 1 Play-off	(Germany) Alba Berlin	09, 12 15/04/2017	... Font de San Lluís, Valencia	Mercedes-Benz Arena, Berlin
2022–23	Gran Canaria (Spain)	71–67	(Turkey) Türk Telekom	03/05/2023	Gran Canaria Arena, Las Palmas	
2024–25	Hapoel Shlomo Tel Aviv (Israel)	177–159 (two-leg)	(Spain) Dreamland Gran Canaria	04 & 11/04/2025	Arena Samokov, Samokov	Gran Canaria Arena, Las Palmas
FIBA Korać Cup (3rd tier)
1974–75	Birra Forst Cantù (Italy)	181–154 (two-leg)	(Spain) FC Barcelona	18 & 25/03/1975	Palau Blaugrana, Barcelona	Palasport Pianella, Cucciago
1980–81	Joventut Freixenet (Spain)	105–104	(Italy) Carrera Venezia	19/03/1981	Palau Blaugrana, Barcelona	
1986–87	FC Barcelona (Spain)	203–171 (two-leg)	(France) Limoges CSP	18 & 25/03/1987	Palau Blaugrana, Barcelona	... Beaublanc, Limoges
1987–88	Real Madrid (Spain)	195–183 (two-leg)	(Socialist Federal Republic of Yugoslavia) Cibona	01 & 09/03/1988	Palacio de Deportes..., Madrid	Košarkaški centar Cibona, Zagreb
1989–90	Ram Joventut (Spain)	195–184 (two-leg)	(Italy) Scavolini Pesaro	21 & 28/03/1990	Palasport Comunale, Pesaro	Pavelló del Joventut, Badalona
1990–91	Shampoo Clear Cantù (Italy)	168–164 (two-leg)	(Spain) Real Madrid Otaysa	20 & 27/03/1991	Palacio de Deportes..., Madrid	Palasport Pianella, Cucciago
1998–99	FC Barcelona (Spain)	174–163 (two-leg)	(Spain) Adecco Estudiantes	24 & 31/03/1999	Palacio de Deportes..., Madrid	Palau Blaugrana, Barcelona
1999–00	Limoges CSP (France)	131–118 (two-leg)	(Spain) Unicaja	22 & 29/03/2000	... Beaublanc, Limoges	Pabellón Ciudad Jardín, Málaga
2000–01	Unicaja (Spain)	148–116 (two-leg)	(Federal Republic of Yugoslavia) Hemofarm	11 & 18/04/2001	Palacio de Deportes..., Málaga	Millennium Centar, Vršac
FIBA EuroChallenge (3rd tier)
2005–06	DKV Joventut (Spain)	88–63	(Russia) Khimki	09/04/2006	Palace of Sports, Kyiv	
2006–07	Akasvayu Girona (Spain)	79–72	(Ukraine) Azovmash	15/04/2007	Palau Girona-Fontajau, Girona	
Basketball Champions League (3rd tier)
2016–17	Iberostar Tenerife (Spain)	63–59	(Turkey) Banvit	30/04/2017	Santiago Martín, San Cristóbal de La Laguna	
2018–19	Virtus Segafredo Bologna (Italy)	73–61	(Spain) Iberostar Tenerife	05/05/2019	Sportpaleis, Antwerp	
2019–20	San Pablo Burgos (Spain)	85–74	(Greece) AEK	04/10/2020	O.A.C.A. Olympic Indoor Hall, Athens	
2020–21	San Pablo Burgos (Spain)	64-59	(Turkey) Pınar Karşıyaka	09/05/2021	Trade Union Sport Palace, Nizhny Novgorod	
2021–22	Lenovo Tenerife (Spain)	98–87	(Spain) Baxi Manresa	08/05/2022	Bilbao Arena, Bilbao	
2023–24	Unicaja Málaga (Spain)	83–67	(Spain) Lenovo Tenerife	28/04/2024	Belgrade Arena, Belgrade	
2024–25	Unicaja Málaga (Spain)	83-67	(Turkey) Galatasaray	11/05/2025	SUNEL Arena, Athens	
Europe Cup (4th tier)
2024–25	Surne Bilbao Basket (Spain)	154–149 (two-leg)	(Greece) PAOK mateco	16 & 23/04/2025	Bilbao Arena, Bilbao	PAOK Sports Arena, Thessaloniki
2025–26	Surne Bilbao Basket (Spain)	162–153 (two-leg)	(Greece) PAOK	22 & 29/04/2025	PAOK Sports Arena, Thessaloniki	Bilbao Arena, Bilbao

== Appearances in World-wide finals ==
Season	Champion	Result	Runner-up	Date	Venue
FIBA Intercontinental Cup
1968	Akron Goodyear Wingfoots (United States)	105–73	(Spain) Real Madrid	06/01/1968	Spectrum, Philadelphia, Pennsylvania
1981	Real Madrid (Spain)	109–83	(Brazil) Sírio	05/07/1981	Ginásio do Ibirapuera, São Paulo
1985	FC Barcelona (Spain)	93–89	(Brazil) Monte Líbano	29/06/1985	Palau Blaugrana, Barcelona
1987	Tracer Milano (Italy)	100–84	(Spain) FC Barcelona	20/09/1987	Palatrussardi, Milan
2015	Real Madrid (Spain)	181–170 (two-leg)	(Brazil) Bauru	25 & 27/09/2015	Ginásio do Ibirapuera, São Paulo
2017	Iberostar Tenerife (Spain)	76–71	(Venezuela) Guaros de Lara	24/09/2015	Santiago Martín, San Cristóbal de La Laguna
McDonald's Championship
1988	Boston Celtics (United States)	111–96	(Spain) Real Madrid	24/10/1988	Palacio de Deportes de la Comunidad de Madrid, Madrid
1991	Los Angeles Lakers (United States)	116–114	(Spain) Montigalà Joventut	19/10/1991	Palais Omnisports de Paris-Bercy, Paris

== Historical progression by team ==
This tables do not include matches for the third place.

=== Andorra ===
Second tier
Season	Earlier stages	Last 24 / 32	Last 12 / 16	Last 6 / 8	Semifinals	Final
2017–18 EuroCup		5th of 6 teams				
2018–19 EuroCup		2nd of 6 teams	2nd of 4 teams	(France) ASVEL	(Germany) Alba Berlin	
2019–20 EuroCup		2nd of 6 teams	4th of 4 teams			
Third tier
Season	Earlier stages	Last 24 / 32	Last 12 / 16	Last 6 / 8	Semifinals	Final
1995–96 Korać Cup	(Austria) Wels	(Serbia and Montenegro) Vojvodina	4th of 4 teams			

=== Askatuak ===
Third tier
Season	Earlier stages	Last 24 / 32	Last 12 / 16	Last 6 / 8	Semifinals	Final
1977–78 Korać Cup		(France) Berck				
1978–79 Korać Cup		(France) Antibes				

=== Barcelona ===
First tier
Season	Earlier stages	Last 24 / 32	Last 12 / 16	Last 6 / 8	Semifinals	Final
1959–60 European Cup			(Morocco) Marocaine	(Poland) Polonia Warszawa		
1981–82 European Cup		1st of 4 teams	Not played	4th of 6 teams		
1983–84 European Cup		(Turkey) Efes Pilsen	(Scotland) Murray Edinburgh	1st of 6 teams	Not played	(Italy) Banco di Roma Virtus
1987–88 European Cup			(Poland) Śląsk Wrocław	5th of 8 teams		
1988–89 European Cup			(Finland) KTP	2nd of 8 teams	(Socialist Federal Republic of Yugoslavia) Jugoplastika	
1989–90 European Cup			(Czechoslovakia) Baník Cigel' Prievidza	1st of 8 teams	(Greece) Aris	(Socialist Federal Republic of Yugoslavia) Jugoplastika
1990–91 European Cup		(Luxembourg) Hiefenech	Not played	1st of 8 teams	(Israel) Maccabi Tel Aviv	(Socialist Federal Republic of Yugoslavia) Pop 84
1991–92 European League		(Turkey) Fenerbahçe	2nd of 8 teams	(Italy) Philips Milano		
1993–94 European League		(Belarus) RTI Minsk	4th of 8 teams	(Turkey) Efes Pilsen	(Spain) 7up Joventut	
1994–95 European League		(Cyprus) Pezoporikos Larnaca	5th of 8 teams			
1995–96 European League			1st of 8 teams	(Turkey) Ülker	(Spain) Real Madrid	(Greece) Panathinaikos
1996–97 EuroLeague		3rd of 6 teams	(Germany) Alba Berlin	(Italy) Teamsystem Bologna	(France) ASVEL	(Greece) Olympiacos
1997–98 EuroLeague		3rd of 6 teams	(Russia) CSKA Moscow			
1999–2000 EuroLeague		1st of 6 teams	(Turkey) Ülker	(Slovenia) Union Olimpija	(Israel) Maccabi Tel Aviv	
2000–01 Euroleague		1st of 6 teams	(Italy) Benetton Treviso			
2001–02 Euroleague		2nd of 8 teams	2nd of 4 teams			
2002–03 Euroleague		2nd of 8 teams	1st of 4 teams	Not played	(Russia) CSKA Moscow	(Italy) Benetton Treviso
2003–04 Euroleague		1st of 8 teams	3rd of 4 teams			
2004–05 Euroleague		2nd of 8 teams	3rd of 4 teams			
2005–06 Euroleague		3rd of 8 teams	1st of 4 teams	(Spain) Real Madrid	(Russia) CSKA Moscow	
2006–07 Euroleague		2nd of 8 teams	2nd of 4 teams	(Spain) Unicaja		
2007–08 Euroleague		3rd of 8 teams	2nd of 4 teams	(Israel) Maccabi Tel Aviv		
2008–09 Euroleague		1st of 6 teams	1st of 4 teams	(Spain) Tau Cerámica	(Russia) CSKA Moscow	
2009–10 Euroleague		1st of 6 teams	1st of 4 teams	(Spain) Real Madrid	(Russia) CSKA Moscow	(Greece) Olympiacos
2010–11 Euroleague		3rd of 6 teams	1st of 4 teams	(Greece) Panathinaikos		
2011–12 Euroleague		1st of 6 teams	1st of 4 teams	(Russia) UNICS	(Greece) Olympiacos	
2012–13 Euroleague		1st of 6 teams	1st of 8 teams	(Greece) Panathinaikos	(Spain) Real Madrid	
2013–14 Euroleague		3rd of 6 teams	1st of 8 teams	(Turkey) Galatasaray	(Spain) Real Madrid	
2014–15 Euroleague		1st of 6 teams	2nd of 8 teams	(Greece) Olympiacos		
2015–16 Euroleague		2nd of 6 teams	3rd of 8 teams	(Russia) Lokomotiv Kuban		
2016–17 EuroLeague			11th of 16 teams			
2017–18 EuroLeague			13th of 16 teams			
2018–19 EuroLeague			5th of 16 teams	(Turkey) Anadolu Efes		
Second tier
Season	Earlier stages	Last 24 / 32	Last 12 / 16	Last 6 / 8	Semifinals	Final
1977–78 Cup Winners' Cup		(England) Embassy Milton Keynes	(Switzerland) Viganello	2nd of 4 teams	(Italy) Gabetti Cantù	
1978–79 Cup Winners' Cup			(Iceland) ÍR	1st of 4 teams	(Italy) Gabetti Cantù	
1979–80 Cup Winners' Cup				2nd of 4 teams	(Italy) Gabetti Cantù	
1980–81 Cup Winners' Cup				1st of 4 teams	(Socialist Federal Republic of Yugoslavia) Cibona	(Italy) Squibb Cantù
1982–83 Cup Winners' Cup				3rd of 4 teams		
1984–85 Cup Winners' Cup			(Luxembourg) Etzella	1st of 4 teams	(Spain) CAI Zaragoza	(Soviet Union) Žalgiris
1985–86 Cup Winners' Cup				1st of 4 teams	(Soviet Union) CSKA Moscow	(Italy) Scavolini Pesaro
Third tier
Season	Earlier stages	Last 24 / 32	Last 12 / 16	Last 6 / 8	Semifinals	Final
1973 Korać Cup			1st of 3 teams	Not played	(Belgium) Maes Pils	
1973–74 Korać Cup	(Portugal) Coimbra	(Luxembourg) T71 Dudelange	2nd of 3 teams			
1974–75 Korać Cup	(Switzerland) Union Neuchâtel	(Portugal) Porto	1st of 4 teams	Not played	(Italy) Brina Rieti	(Italy) Forst Cantù
1975–76 Korać Cup			2nd of 4 teams			
1986–87 Korać Cup			1st of 4 teams	Not played	(Italy) Mobilgirgi Caserta	(France) Limoges CSP
1992–93 Korać Cup	(Romania) Sibiu	(Poland) Stal Bobrek Bytom	1st of 4 teams	(Croatia) Zagreb	(Italy) Virtus Roma	
1998–99 Korać Cup	1st of 4 teams	(Slovenia) Krka	(Turkey) Darüşşafaka	(Italy) Ducato Siena	(Greece) Panionios	(Spain) Adecco Estudiantes

=== Baskonia ===
First tier
Season	Earlier stages	Last 24 / 32	Last 12 / 16	Last 6 / 8	Semifinals	Final
1998–99 EuroLeague		5th of 6 teams				
2000–01 Euroleague		3rd of 6 teams	(Greece) Peristeri	(Greece) Olympiacos	(Greece) AEK Athens	(Italy) Virtus Bologna
2001–02 Euroleague		1st of 8 teams	2nd of 4 teams			
2002–03 Euroleague		2nd of 8 teams	3rd of 4 teams			
2003–04 Euroleague		4th of 8 teams	2nd of 4 teams			
2004–05 Euroleague		5th of 8 teams	2nd of 4 teams	(Italy) Treviso	(Russia) CSKA Moscow	(Israel) Maccabi Tel Aviv
2005–06 Euroleague		1st of 8 teams	2nd of 4 teams	(Greece) Panathinaikos	(Israel) Maccabi Tel Aviv	
2006–07 Euroleague		1st of 8 teams	1st of 4 teams	(Greece) Olympiacos	(Greece) Panathinaikos	
2007–08 Euroleague		3rd of 8 teams	1st of 4 teams	(Serbia) Partizan	(Russia) CSKA Moscow	
2008–09 Euroleague		1st of 6 teams	2nd of 4 teams	(Spain) Barcelona		
2009–10 Euroleague		2nd of 6 teams	2nd of 4 teams	(Russia) CSKA Moscow		
2010–11 Euroleague		2nd of 6 teams	1st of 4 teams	(Israel) Maccabi Tel Aviv		
2011–12 Euroleague		5th of 6 teams				
2012–13 Euroleague		4th of 6 teams	4th of 8 teams	(Russia) CSKA Moscow		
2013–14 Euroleague		2nd of 6 teams	7th of 8 teams			
2014–15 Euroleague		3rd of 6 teams	5th of 8 teams			
2015–16 Euroleague		3rd of 6 teams	2nd of 8 teams	(Greece) Panathinaikos	(Turkey) Fenerbahçe	
2016–17 EuroLeague			7th of 16 teams	(Russia) CSKA Moscow		
2017–18 EuroLeague			7th of 16 teams	(Turkey) Fenerbahçe		
2018–19 EuroLeague			7th of 16 teams	(Russia) CSKA Moscow		
Second tier
Season	Earlier stages	Last 24 / 32	Last 12 / 16	Last 6 / 8	Semifinals	Final
1993–94 European Cup	(Hungary) Körmend	(Lithuania) Žalgiris	2nd of 6 teams	Not played	(France) Cholet	(Slovenia) Olimpija
1994–95 European Cup	(Slovakia) Pezinok	(Israel) Hapoel Jerusalem	1st of 6 teams	Not played	(Greece) Iraklis	(Italy) Treviso
1995–96 European Cup	(Finland) Namika	(Croatia) Zagreb	1st of 6 teams	Not played	(Russia) Dynamo Moscow	(Greece) PAOK
1999–00 Saporta Cup	3rd of 6 teams	(Israel) Maccabi Ra'anana	(Greece) AEK Athens			
Third tier
Season	Earlier stages	Last 24 / 32	Last 12 / 16	Last 6 / 8	Semifinals	Final
1985–86 Korać Cup	(Netherlands) Virtus Werkendam	(France) ASVEL				
1991–92 Korać Cup		(Germany) Ludwigsburg	1st of 4 teams	(Italy) Cantù		
1992–93 Korać Cup	(Czechoslovakia) Prievidza	(Belgium) Verviers-Pepinster	4th of 4 teams			
1996–97 Korać Cup	1st of 4 teams	(France) Nancy	(Greece) Peristeri			
1997–98 Korać Cup	2nd of 4 teams	(Italy) Scaligera				

=== Bilbao ===
First tier
Season	Earlier stages	Last 24 / 32	Last 12 / 16	Last 6 / 8	Semifinals	Final
2011–12 Euroleague		4th of 6 teams	2nd of 4 teams	(Russia) CSKA Moscow		
Second tier
Season	Earlier stages	Last 24 / 32	Last 12 / 16	Last 6 / 8	Semifinals	Final
2008–09 Eurocup		1st of 4 teams	1st of 4 teams	(Croatia) Zadar	(Russia) Khimki	
2009–10 Eurocup	(Ukraine) Donetsk	1st of 4 teams	1st of 4 teams	(Czech Republic) Nymburk	(Germany) Alba Berlin	
2012–13 Eurocup		1st of 4 teams	1st of 4 teams	(Germany) Ulm	(Ukraine) Budivelnik	(Russia) Lokomotiv Kuban
2013–14 Eurocup	3rd of 6 teams	3rd of 4 teams				
2015–16 Eurocup	1st of 6 teams	3rd of 4 teams				
2016–17 EuroCup		5th of 5 teams				
2017–18 EuroCup		5th of 6 teams				

=== Breogán ===
Third tier
Season	Earlier stages	Last 24 / 32	Last 12 / 16	Last 6 / 8	Semifinals	Final
1985–86 Korać Cup			4th of 4 teams			

=== Cáceres ===
Second tier
Season	Earlier stages	Last 24 / 32	Last 12 / 16	Last 6 / 8	Semifinals	Final
1997–98 EuroCup	1st of 6 teams	(Croatia) Zagreb				
Third tier
Season	Earlier stages	Last 24 / 32	Last 12 / 16	Last 6 / 8	Semifinals	Final
1994–95 Korać Cup	(Netherlands) Den Braven	(Israel) Hapoel Galil Elyon	1st of 4 teams	(Italy) Trieste	(Germany) Alba Berlin	
1996–97 Korać Cup	1st of 4 teams	(Portugal) Ovarense	(Croatia) Zrinjevac	(Turkey) Tofaş		
2000–01 Korać Cup	(Portugal) Oliveirense	1st of 4 teams	(Belgium) Ieper			

=== Cajamadrid ===
Third tier
Season	Earlier stages	Last 24 / 32	Last 12 / 16	Last 6 / 8	Semifinals	Final
1984–85 Korać Cup		(Austria) Wörthersee Piraten	3rd of 4 teams			

=== Canarias ===
Third tier
Season	Earlier stages	Last 24 / 32	Last 12 / 16	Last 6 / 8	Semifinals	Final
1977–78 Korać Cup	(West Germany) Hagen					
1988–89 Korać Cup	(England) Birmingham Bullets	(Belgium) Mechelen				
2016–17 Champions League	1st of 8 teams	Bye	(Greece) PAOK	(France) ASVEL	(Italy) Reyer Venezia	(Turkey) Banvit
2017–18 Champions League		1st of 8 teams	(Spain) Murcia			
2018–19 Champions League		1st of 8 teams	(Greece) Promitheas	(Israel) Hapoel Jerusalem	(Belgium) Antwerp Giants	(Italy) Virtus Bologna
2019–20 Champions League		2nd of 8 teams				

=== Círcol Catòlic ===
Third tier
Season	Earlier stages	Last 24 / 32	Last 12 / 16	Last 6 / 8	Semifinals	Final
1978–79 Korać Cup		(France) Challans	1st of 4 teams	Not Played	(Italy) Sebastiani Rieti	
1979–80 Korać Cup		(England) Sunderland	2nd of 4 teams			
1980–81 Korać Cup		(Belgium) Anderlecht				
1981–82 Korać Cup		(Netherlands) Donar	2nd of 4 teams			
1984–85 Korać Cup	(Scotland) Glasgow	(France) Antibes	3rd of 4 teams			

=== Collado Villalba ===
Third tier
Season	Earlier stages	Last 24 / 32	Last 12 / 16	Last 6 / 8	Semifinals	Final
1991–92 Korać Cup	(Belgium) Castors Braine	(Greece) Iraklis				

=== Espanyol ===
Third tier
Season	Earlier stages	Last 24 / 32	Last 12 / 16	Last 6 / 8	Semifinals	Final
1986–87 Korać Cup	(Switzerland) Vevey	(France) Antibes				

=== Estudiantes ===
First tier
Season	Earlier stages		Last 24 / 32	Last 12 / 16	Last 6 / 8	Semifinals	Final
1991–92 European League			(Sweden) Södertälje	2nd of 8 teams	(Israel) Maccabi Tel Aviv	(Spain) Joventut	
1992–93 European League			(Czechoslovakia) USK Praha	7th of 8 teams			
1996–97 EuroLeague			3rd of 6 teams	(France) ASVEL			
1997–98 EuroLeague			4th of 6 teams	(Italy) Virtus Bologna			
2000–01 Euroleague			4th of 6 teams	(Italy) Virtus Bologna			
2004–05 Euroleague			6th of 8 teams				
Second tier
Season	Earlier stages		Last 24 / 32	Last 12 / 16	Last 6 / 8	Semifinals	Final
1973–74 Cup Winners' Cup			(Portugal) Benfica	(Austria) Wels	2nd of 3 teams	(Socialist Federal Republic of Yugoslavia) Crvena zvezda	
1975–76 Cup Winners' Cup			(Finland) Espoon Honka	1st of 4 teams	(France) ASPO Tours		
2001–02 Saporta Cup			4th of 6 teams	(Spain) Valencia			
2002–03 ULEB Cup			2nd of 6 teams	(Italy) Roseto Sharks	(Italy) Varese	(Spain) Valencia	
2003–04 ULEB Cup			1st of 6 teams	(Belgium) Spirou	(Spain) Lleida	(Spain) Real Madrid	
2005–06 ULEB Cup			5th of 6 teams				
2010–11 ULEB Cup			2nd of 4 teams	1st of 4 teams	(Croatia) Cedevita		
Third tier
Season	Earlier stages		Last 24 / 32	Last 12 / 16	Last 6 / 8	Semifinals	Final
1986–87 Korać Cup			(France) Avignon	2nd of 4 teams			
1987–88 Korać Cup			(Greece) Iraklis	3rd of 4 teams			
1988–89 Korać Cup	(Portugal) Estrelas		(Socialist Federal Republic of Yugoslavia) Olimpija	4th of 4 teams			
1990–91 Korać Cup	(Cyprus) Apollon		(France) Gravelines	2nd of 4 teams	(Spain) Joventut		
1993–94 Korać Cup			(Germany) Ludwigsburg	3rd of 4 teams			
1994–95 Korać Cup	(England) Manchester Giants		(Turkey) Tofaş	3rd of 4 teams			
1995–96 Korać Cup	(Hungary) Atomerőmű		(Belgium) Spirou	3rd of 4 teams			
1998–99 Korać Cup	1st of 4 teams		(Croatia) Dubrava	(Poland) Pogoń	(Russia) Arsenal	(Belgium) Oostende	(Spain) Barcelona
1999–00 Korać Cup	1st of 4 teams		(Cyprus) Apollon	(Greece) Peristeri	(Poland) Włocławek	(Spain) Málaga	
2006–07 EuroCup			1st of 4 teams	1st of 4 teams	(Russia) Dynamo Moscow	(Spain) Girona	
2017–18 Champions League	(Netherlands) Donar		5th of 8 teams				
2018–19 Champions League	(Sweden) Norrköping	(Poland) Toruń					

=== Fuenlabrada ===
Second tier
Season	Earlier stages	Last 24 / 32	Last 12 / 16	Last 6 / 8	Semifinals	Final
2002–03 ULEB Cup		6th of 6 teams				
2016–17 EuroCup		2nd of 5 teams	3rd of 4 teams			
Third tier
Season	Earlier stages	Last 24 / 32	Last 12 / 16	Last 6 / 8	Semifinals	Final
1999–00 Korać Cup	3rd of 4 teams					
2001–02 Korać Cup	(Belgium) Bree	1st of 4 teams	(Portugal) Porto	(Greece) Maroussi		
2011–12 EuroChallenge		2nd of 4 teams	1st of 4 teams	(Russia) Triumph		
2018–19 Champions League		8th of 8 teams				

=== Girona ===
Second tier
Season	Earlier stages	Last 24 / 32	Last 12 / 16	Last 6 / 8	Semifinals	Final
2007–08 ULEB Cup	1st of 6 teams	(France) Élan Chalon	(Serbia) Vršac	(Russia) UNICS	(Russia) Dynamo Moscow	(Spain) Joventut
Third tier
Season	Earlier stages	Last 24 / 32	Last 12 / 16	Last 6 / 8	Semifinals	Final
1989–90 Korać Cup	(Luxembourg) Contern	(Italy) Libertas Livorno				
1999–00 Korać Cup	1st of 4 teams	(Italy) Andrea Costa	(Italy) Rimini Crabs	(Italy) Virtus Roma	(France) Limoges	
2000–01 Korać Cup	(Belgium) Ieper					
2006–07 EuroCup		1st of 4 teams	1st of 4 teams	(Greece) Panionios	(Spain) Estudiantes	(Ukraine) Azovmash

=== Granada ===
Third tier
Season	Earlier stages	Last 24 / 32	Last 12 / 16	Last 6 / 8	Semifinals	Final
1996–97 Korać Cup	2nd of 4 teams	(Italy) Virtus Roma				

=== Gran Canaria ===
First tier
Season	Earlier stages	Last 24 / 32	Last 12 / 16	Last 6 / 8	Semifinals	Final
2018–19 EuroLeague			14th of 16 teams			
Second tier
Season	Earlier stages	Last 24 / 32	Last 12 / 16	Last 6 / 8	Semifinals	Final
2003–04 ULEB Cup		2nd of 6 teams	(Spain) Real Madrid			
2004–05 ULEB Cup		3rd of 6 teams				
2006–07 ULEB Cup		4th of 6 teams	(Serbia) FMP			
2007–08 ULEB Cup	1st of 6 teams	(Bosnia and Herzegovina) Bosna	(Turkey) Galatasaray			
2008–09 Eurocup	(Switzerland) Fribourg	4th of 4 teams				
2009–10 Eurocup		2nd of 4 teams	1st of 4 teams	(Greece) Panellinios		
2010–11 Eurocup	(Croatia) Zagreb	1st of 4 teams	3rd of 4 teams			
2011–12 Eurocup	(Germany) Artland Dragons	3rd of 4 teams				
2014–15 Eurocup	1st of 6 teams	1st of 4 teams	(Croatia) Cedevita	(Turkey) Karşıyaka	(Russia) UNICS	(Russia) Khimki
2015–16 Eurocup	1st of 6 teams	1st of 4 teams	(France) Limoges	(Poland) Zielona Góra	(Turkey) Galatasaray	
2016–17 EuroCup		1st of 5 teams	2nd of 4 teams	(Israel) Hapoel Jerusalem		
2017–18 EuroCup		4th of 6 teams	2nd of 4 teams	(Russia) Lokomotiv Kuban		
Third tier
Season	Earlier stages	Last 24 / 32	Last 12 / 16	Last 6 / 8	Semifinals	Final
2000-01 Korać Cup	Portugal Telecom					
2005–06 EuroCup		3rd of 4 teams				

=== Granollers ===
Third tier
Season	Earlier stages	Last 24 / 32	Last 12 / 16	Last 6 / 8	Semifinals	Final
1978–79 Korać Cup	(England) Sunderland	(France) Caen				
1985–86 Korać Cup	(Luxembourg) Amicale	(Belgium) Mechelen	4th of 4 teams			

=== Joventut ===
First tier
Season	Earlier stages		Last 24 / 32	Last 12 / 16	Last 6 / 8	Semifinals	Final
1967–68 European Cup			(Morocco) FAR Rabat	(Poland) Legia Warsaw	3rd of 4 teams		
1978–79 European Cup			1st of 4 teams	Not played	5th of 6 teams		
1991–92 European League			1st of 8 teams	(Croatia) Cibona	(Spain) Estudiantes	(Serbia and Montenegro) Partizan	
1992–93 European League			5th of 8 teams				
1993–94 European League			(Latvia) Brocēni	3rd of 8 teams	(Spain) Real Madrid	(Spain) Barcelona	(Greece) Olympiacos
1994–95 European League			(Latvia) Brocēni	8th of 8 teams			
2006–07 Euroleague			3rd of 8 teams	4th of 4 teams			
2008–09 Euroleague			5th of 6 teams				
Second tier
Season	Earlier stages		Last 24 / 32	Last 12 / 16	Last 6 / 8	Semifinals	Final
1966–67 Cup Winners' Cup			(Portugal) Benfica	(Netherlands) Flamingo's Haarlem	(Israel) Maccabi Tel Aviv		
1969–70 Cup Winners' Cup			(Austria) Radenthein	(Finland) Helsingin Kisa-Toverit	(Greece) AEK Athens		
1970–71 Cup Winners' Cup			(Scotland) Boroughmuir	(Hungary) MAFC	(Bulgaria) Balkan Botevgrad	(Soviet Union) Spartak St.Petersburg	
1971–72 Cup Winners' Cup			(Albania) Partizani Tirana	(England) Crystal Palace	2nd of 3 teams	(Socialist Federal Republic of Yugoslavia) Crvena zvezda	
1972–73 Cup Winners' Cup			(Luxembourg) Sparta Bertrange	(France) Antibes	2nd of 3 teams	(Soviet Union) Spartak St.Petersburg	
1974–75 Cup Winners' Cup			(Egypt) Al-Gezira	(Hungary) Honvéd	4th of 4 teams		
1976–77 Cup Winners' Cup			(Netherlands) Flamingo's Haarlem	(Scotland) Boroughmuir	2nd of 4 teams	(Socialist Federal Republic of Yugoslavia) Radnički	
1985–86 Cup Winners' Cup			(England) Manchester Giants	1st of 4 teams	(Italy) Victoria Libertas		
1986–87 Cup Winners' Cup					3rd of 4 teams		
1987–88 Cup Winners' Cup			(Luxembourg) Contern	Not played	1st of 4 teams	(West Germany) Bayer Leverkusen	(France) Limoges
1997–98 EuroCup	1st of 6 teams		(Turkey) Fenerbahçe	(France) ASVEL			
1998–99 Saporta Cup	1st of 6 teams		(Austria) Oberwart Gunners	(Israel) Hapoel Jerusalem	(Spain) Valencia		
2002–03 ULEB Cup			2nd of 6 teams	(Belgium) Spirou	(Serbia and Montenegro) FMP	(Slovenia) Krka	
2003–04 ULEB Cup			3rd of 6 teams	(Italy) Olimpia Milano	(Serbia and Montenegro) FMP		
2004–05 ULEB Cup	2nd of 6 teams		(Spain) Valencia				
2007–08 ULEB Cup	1st of 6 teams		(Austria) Swans Gmunden	(Russia) Khimki	(Spain) Valencia	(Turkey) Galatasaray	(Spain) Girona
2009–10 Eurocup			2nd of 4 teams	3rd of 4 teams			
2019–20 EuroCup			4th of 6 teams	3rd of 4 teams			
Third tier
Season	Earlier stages		Last 24 / 32	Last 12 / 16	Last 6 / 8	Semifinals	Final
1973–74 Korać Cup	(Switzerland) Federale		(Portugal) Porto	2nd of 3 teams			
1975–76 Korać Cup			(West Germany) Wolfenbüttel	1st of 4 teams	Not Played	(Italy) Auxilium Torino	
1977–78 Korać Cup			(France) Pau-Orthez	1st of 4 teams	Not Played	(Socialist Federal Republic of Yugoslavia) Partizan	
1979–80 Korać Cup			(Hungary) Vasas	3rd of 4 teams			
1980–81 Korać Cup				1st of 4 teams	Not played	(Socialist Federal Republic of Yugoslavia) Crvena Zvezda	(Italy) Reyer Venezia
1981–82 Korać Cup			3rd of 4 teams				
1982–83 Korać Cup			4th of 4 teams				
1988–89 Korać Cup			(West Germany) Bamberg	2nd of 4 teams			
1989–90 Korać Cup			(Belgium) Spirou	1st of 4 teams	(Italy) Libertas Livorno	(Socialist Federal Republic of Yugoslavia) Bosna	(Italy) Victoria Libertas
1990–91 Korać Cup			(Switzerland) Bellinzona	1st of 4 teams	(Spain) Estudiantes	(Spain) Real Madrid	
2005–06 EuroCup			1st of 4 teams	2nd of 4 teams	(Russia) Lokomotiv Rostov	(Ukraine) Kyiv	(Russia) Khimki
2017–18 Champions League	(Georgia (country)) Dinamo Tbilisi	(Finland) Kataja					

=== Kas Vitoria ===
Second tier
Season	Earlier stages	Last 24 / 32	Last 12 / 16	Last 6 / 8	Semifinals	Final
1967–68 Cup Winners' Cup		(Portugal) Coimbra	(Greece) AEK Athens			
Third tier
Season	Earlier stages	Last 24 / 32	Last 12 / 16	Last 6 / 8	Semifinals	Final
1973–74 Korać Cup	(West Germany) Wolfenbüttel	(France) Antibes				

=== Inmobanco ===
Third tier
Season	Earlier stages	Last 24 / 32	Last 12 / 16	Last 6 / 8	Semifinals	Final
1980–81 Korać Cup	(England) Hemel Hempstead	(France) Pau-Orthez				

=== León ===
Third tier
Season	Earlier stages	Last 24 / 32	Last 12 / 16	Last 6 / 8	Semifinals	Final
1992–93 Korać Cup	(Switzerland) Bellinzona	(Germany) Alba Berlin	2nd of 4 teams	(Italy) Virtus Roma		
1993–94 Korać Cup		(Austria) Traiskirchen	(Israel) Hapoel Jerusalem	3rd of 4 teams		
1997–98 Korać Cup		1st of 4 teams	(Greece) Peristeri			

=== Lleida ===
Second tier
Season	Earlier stages	Last 24 / 32	Last 12 / 16	Last 6 / 8	Semifinals	Final
2002–03 ULEB Cup		2nd of 6 teams	(Russia) Ural Great	(Slovenia) Krka		
2003–04 ULEB Cup		1st of 6 teams	(Greece) Makedonikos	(Spain) Estudiantes		

=== Lucentum Alicante ===
Second tier
Season	Earlier stages	Last 24 / 32	Last 12 / 16	Last 6 / 8	Semifinals	Final
2003–04 ULEB Cup		5th of 6 teams				
2005–06 ULEB Cup		3rd of 6 teams	(Serbia and Montenegro) Vršac			

=== Málaga ===
First tier
Season	Earlier stages	Last 24 / 32	Last 12 / 16	Last 6 / 8	Semifinals	Final
1995–96 European League		(Croatia) Zrinjevac	5th of 8 teams			
2001–02 Euroleague		5th of 8 teams				
2002–03 Euroleague		4th of 8 teams	4th of 4 teams			
2003–04 Euroleague		7th of 8 teams				
2004–05 Euroleague		6th of 8 teams				
2005–06 Euroleague		1st of 8 teams	3rd of 4 teams			
2006–07 Euroleague		4th of 8 teams	1st of 4 teams	(Spain) Barcelona	(Russia) CSKA Moscow	
2007–08 Euroleague		3rd of 8 teams	3rd of 4 teams			
2008–09 Euroleague		1st of 6 teams	3rd of 4 teams			
2009–10 Euroleague		2nd of 6 teams	3rd of 4 teams			
2010–11 Euroleague		3rd of 6 teams	4th of 4 teams			
2011–12 Euroleague		3rd of 6 teams	4th of 4 teams			
2012–13 Euroleague		2nd of 6 teams	5th of 8 teams			
2013–14 Euroleague		3rd of 6 teams	5th of 8 teams			
2014–15 Euroleague		3rd of 6 teams	7th of 8 teams			
2015–16 Euroleague		2nd of 6 teams	7th of 8 teams			
2017–18 EuroLeague			9th of 16 teams			
Second tier
Season	Earlier stages	Last 24 / 32	Last 12 / 16	Last 6 / 8	Semifinals	Final
2016–17 EuroCup		4th of 5 teams	2nd of 4 teams	(Germany) Bayern Munich	(Russia) Lokomotiv Kuban	(Spain) Valencia
2018–19 EuroCup		2nd of 6 teams	2nd of 4 teams	(Germany) Alba Berlin		
2019–20 EuroCup		1st of 6 teams	1st of 4 teams			
Third tier
Season	Earlier stages	Last 24 / 32	Last 12 / 16	Last 6 / 8	Semifinals	Final
1989–90 Korać Cup	(Belgium) Castors Braine					
1990–91 Korać Cup	(West Germany) Charlottenburg					
1996–97 Korać Cup	1st of 4 teams	(Slovenia) Maribor	(Italy) Olimpia Pistoia	(Poland) Pruszków		
1997–98 Korać Cup	1st of 4 teams	(Lithuania) Šiauliai	(Italy) Virtus Roma			
1998–99 Korać Cup	4th of 4 teams					
1999–00 Korać Cup	1st of 4 teams	(Italy) Reggiana	(Turkey) Galatasaray	(Greece) Maroussi	(Spain) Estudiantes	(France) Limoges
2000–01 Korać Cup	(Belgium) Mons-Hainaut	1st of 4 teams	(France) Dijon	(Israel) Ironi Ramat Gan	(Netherlands) Amsterdam	(Serbia and Montenegro) Vršac

=== Manresa ===
First tier
Season	Earlier stages	Last 24 / 32	Last 12 / 16	Last 6 / 8	Semifinals	Final
1998–99 EuroLeague		5th of 6 teams				
Second tier
Season	Earlier stages	Last 24 / 32	Last 12 / 16	Last 6 / 8	Semifinals	Final
1996–97 EuroCup	2nd of 6 teams	(Hungary) Körmend	(Greece) Iraklis			
Third tier
Season	Earlier stages	Last 24 / 32	Last 12 / 16	Last 6 / 8	Semifinals	Final
1972 Korać Cup				(France) Antibes		
1987–88 Korać Cup		(England) Manchester Giants				
1994–95 Korać Cup	(Hungary) Alba Fehérvár	(Turkey) Galatasaray	3rd of 4 teams			
1995–96 Korać Cup	(Belgium) Verviers-Pepinster	(Turkey) Tofaş	3rd of 4 teams			
1997–98 Korać Cup	2nd of 4 teams	(Greece) Aris				
2019–20 Champions League		5th of 8 teams				

=== Miraflores ===
Third tier
Season	Earlier stages	Last 24 / 32	Last 12 / 16	Last 6 / 8	Semifinals	Final
2019–20 Champions League	(Ukraine) Kyiv Basket	3rd of 8 teams				

=== Murcia ===
Second tier
Season	Earlier stages	Last 24 / 32	Last 12 / 16	Last 6 / 8	Semifinals	Final
2016–17 EuroCup		3rd of 5 teams	4th of 4 teams			
Third tier
Season	Earlier stages	Last 24 / 32	Last 12 / 16	Last 6 / 8	Semifinals	Final
2017–18 Champions League		4th of 8 teams	(Spain) Canarias	(Turkey) Karşıyaka	(Greece) AEK Athens	
2018–19 Champions League	(Belgium) Spirou	1st of 8 teams	(Belgium) Antwerp Giants			

=== OAR Ferrol ===
Third tier
Season	Earlier stages	Last 24 / 32	Last 12 / 16	Last 6 / 8	Semifinals	Final
1981–82 Korać Cup	(Portugal) Sangalhos	(France) Tours				
1982–83 Korać Cup	(France) Monaco					
1984–85 Korać Cup	(Belgium) Mechelen	(Greece) AEK Athens	3rd of 4 teams			

=== Ourense ===
Third tier
Season	Earlier stages	Last 24 / 32	Last 12 / 16	Last 6 / 8	Semifinals	Final
2002–03 Champions Cup	2nd of 6 teams	4th of 4 teams				

=== Picadero ===
Second tier
Season	Earlier stages	Last 24 / 32	Last 12 / 16	Last 6 / 8	Semifinals	Final
1968–69 Cup Winners' Cup		(Sweden) Solna	(East Germany) Berlin 1893			
Third tier
Season	Earlier stages	Last 24 / 32	Last 12 / 16	Last 6 / 8	Semifinals	Final
1972 Korać Cup				(Belgium) Standard Liège		
1973 Korać Cup			1st of 3 teams	Not Played	(Italy) Cantù	

=== Pineda ===
Third tier
Season	Earlier stages	Last 24 / 32	Last 12 / 16	Last 6 / 8	Semifinals	Final
1974–75 Korać Cup	(France) Denain Voltaire					
1978–79 Korać Cup		(Belgium) Standard Liège				

=== Real Betis ===
First tier
Season	Earlier stages	Last 24 / 32	Last 12 / 16	Last 6 / 8	Semifinals	Final
1996–97 EuroLeague		4th of 6 teams	(Italy) Fortitudo Bologna			
1999–00 EuroLeague		5th of 6 teams				
Second tier
Season	Earlier stages	Last 24 / 32	Last 12 / 16	Last 6 / 8	Semifinals	Final
2000–01 Saporta Cup		4th of 6 teams	(Poland) Włocławek			
2008–09 Eurocup	(Latvia) ASK Riga					
2010–11 Eurocup		2nd of 4 teams	2nd of 4 teams	(Ukraine) Budivelnik	(Italy) Treviso	(Russia) UNICS
2012–13 Eurocup		2nd of 4 teams	4th of 4 teams			
2014–15 Eurocup	4th of 6 teams	4th of 4 teams				
Third tier
Season	Earlier stages	Last 24 / 32	Last 12 / 16	Last 6 / 8	Semifinals	Final
1993–94 Korać Cup	(Portugal) Esgueira	(Israel) Bnei Hasharon	4th of 4 teams			
1994–95 Korać Cup	(Belgium) Verviers-Pepinster	(Germany) Ulm	3rd of 4 teams			
2008–09 EuroChallenge		2nd of 4 teams	3rd of 4 teams			

=== Real Madrid ===
First tier
Season	Earlier stages	Last 24 / 32	Last 12 / 16	Last 6 / 8	Semifinals	Final
1958 European Cup			(Portugal) Barreirense	(Belgium) Anderlecht	(Soviet Union) Rīgas ASK	
1958–59 European Cup		(Switzerland) Urania Genève	(France) Charleville			
1960–61 European Cup			(Austria) Engelmann Wien	(Belgium) Antwerpse	(Soviet Union) Rīgas ASK	
1961–62 European Cup		(Morocco) Casablancais	(Italy) Varese	(Poland) Legia Warsaw	(Socialist Federal Republic of Yugoslavia) Olimpija	(Soviet Union) Dinamo Tbilisi
1962–63 European Cup		(Portugal) Benfica	(Greece) Panathinaikos	(Hungary) Honvéd	(Czechoslovakia) Brno	(Soviet Union) CSKA Moscow
1963–64 European Cup		(Northern Ireland) Celtic	(West Germany) Alemannia Aachen	(Poland) Legia Warsaw	(Italy) Olimpia Milano	(Czechoslovakia) Brno
1964–65 European Cup			(Finland) Helsingin	(France) ASVEL	(Socialist Federal Republic of Yugoslavia) OKK Beograd	(Soviet Union) CSKA Moscow
1965–66 European Cup			(Sweden) Alvik	4th of 4 teams		
1966–67 European Cup		(Luxembourg) Black Star Mersch	(West Germany) Heidelberg	1st of 4 teams	(Socialist Federal Republic of Yugoslavia) Olimpija	(Italy) Olimpia Milano
1967–68 European Cup		(Scotland) Boroughmuir	(Netherlands) Utrecht	2nd of 4 teams	(Socialist Federal Republic of Yugoslavia) Zadar	(Czechoslovakia) Brno
1968–69 European Cup		(England) Aldershot Warriors	(West Germany) Gießen 46ers	1st of 4 teams	(Belgium) Standard Liège	(Soviet Union) CSKA Moscow
1969–70 European Cup		(Portugal) Sporting	(Hungary) Honvéd	1st of 4 teams	(Italy) Varese	
1970–71 European Cup		(Sweden) Alvik	(United Arab Republic) Al-Zamalek	2nd of 4 teams	(Italy) Varese	
1971–72 European Cup		(Denmark) Virum	(West Germany) Leverkusen	2nd of 4 teams	(Socialist Federal Republic of Yugoslavia) Split	
1972–73 European Cup		(Iceland) ÍR	(England) Epping Avenue	3rd of 4 teams		
1973–74 European Cup		(Switzerland) Fribourg	(West Germany) Heidelberg	1st of 4 teams	(France) Berck	(Italy) Varese
1974–75 European Cup			1st of 6 teams	Not played	(Socialist Federal Republic of Yugoslavia) Zadar	(Italy) Varese
1975–76 European Cup		(Iceland) ÍR	1st of 6 teams	Not played	(France) ASVEL	(Italy) Varese
1976–77 European Cup		1st of 4 teams	Not played	4th of 6 teams		
1977–78 European Cup		1st of 4 teams	Not played	1st of 6 teams	Not played	(Italy) Varese
1978–79 European Cup		1st of 4 teams	Not played	4th of 6 teams		
1979–80 European Cup		1st of 4 teams	Not played	2nd of 6 teams	Not played	(Israel) Maccabi Tel Aviv
1980–81 European Cup		1st of 4 teams	Not played	5th of 6 teams		
1982–83 European Cup		(Sweden) Alvik	(England) Crystal Palace	3rd of 6 teams		
1984–85 European Cup		(Austria) Klosterneuburg	(Switzerland) Vevey	2nd of 6 teams	Not played	(Socialist Federal Republic of Yugoslavia) Cibona
1985–86 European Cup		(Scotland) Livingston	(Switzerland) Fribourg	4th of 6 teams		
1986–87 European Cup		(England) Manchester Giants	(Czechoslovakia) Brno	6th of 6 teams		
1992–93 European League		(Bulgaria) CSKA Sofia	1st of 8 teams	(Italy) Virtus Bologna	(France) Limoges	
1993–94 European League			2nd of 8 teams	(Spain) Joventut		
1994–95 European League			2nd of 8 teams	(Croatia) Cibona	(France) Limoges	(Greece) Olympiacos
1995–96 European League		(England) Sheffield Sharks	2nd of 8 teams	(Greece) Olympiacos	(Spain) Barcelona	
1997–98 EuroLeague		5th of 6 teams				
1998–99 EuroLeague		3rd of 6 teams	(Turkey) Fenerbahçe	(Italy) Fortitudo Bologna		
1999–00 EuroLeague		3rd of 6 teams	(France) ASVEL			
2000–01 Euroleague		2nd of 6 teams	(Serbia and Montenegro) Budućnost	(Italy) Fortitudo Bologna		
2001–02 Euroleague		2nd of 8 teams	3rd of 4 teams			
2002–03 Euroleague		6th of 8 teams				
2004–05 Euroleague		4th of 8 teams	4th of 4 teams			
2005–06 Euroleague		4th of 8 teams	2nd of 4 teams	(Spain) Barcelona		
2007–08 Euroleague		2nd of 8 teams	3rd of 4 teams			
2008–09 Euroleague		2nd of 6 teams	2nd of 4 teams	(Greece) Olympiacos		
2009–10 Euroleague		1st of 6 teams	2nd of 4 teams	(Spain) Barcelona		
2010–11 Euroleague		2nd of 6 teams	1st of 4 teams	(Spain) Valencia	(Israel) Maccabi Tel Aviv	
2011–12 Euroleague		1st of 6 teams	3rd of 4 teams			
2012–13 Euroleague		1st of 6 teams	2nd of 8 teams	(Israel) Maccabi Tel Aviv	(Spain) Barcelona	(Greece) Olympiacos
2013–14 Euroleague		1st of 6 teams	2nd of 8 teams	(Greece) Olympiacos	(Spain) Barcelona	(Israel) Maccabi Tel Aviv
2014–15 Euroleague		1st of 6 teams	1st of 8 teams	(Turkey) Anadolu Efes	(Turkey) Fenerbahçe	(Greece) Olympiacos
2015–16 Euroleague		4th of 6 teams	4th of 8 teams	(Turkey) Fenerbahçe		
2016–17 EuroLeague			1st of 16 teams	(Turkey) Darüşşafaka	(Turkey) Fenerbahçe	
2017–18 EuroLeague			5th of 16 teams	(Greece) Panathinaikos	(Russia) CSKA Moscow	(Turkey) Fenerbahçe
2018–19 EuroLeague			3rd of 16 teams	(Greece) Panathinaikos	(Russia) CSKA Moscow	
2019–20 EuroLeague			2nd of 18 teams	Season Cancelled due to COVID-19.		
2020–21 EuroLeague			6th of 18 teams	(Turkey) Anadolu Efes		
2021–22 EuroLeague			4th of 15 teams	(Israel) Maccabi Tel Aviv	(Spain) Barcelona	(Turkey) Anadolu Efes
Second tier
Season	Earlier stages	Last 24 / 32	Last 12 / 16	Last 6 / 8	Semifinals	Final
1981–82 Cup Winners' Cup			(Denmark) BMS	1st of 4 teams	(Italy) Virtus Bologna	(Socialist Federal Republic of Yugoslavia) Cibona
1983–84 Cup Winners' Cup				1st of 4 teams	(Socialist Federal Republic of Yugoslavia) Cibona	(Italy) Olimpia Milano
1988–89 Cup Winners' Cup			(England) Guildford Kings	1st of 4 teams	(Socialist Federal Republic of Yugoslavia) Cibona	(Italy) Juvecaserta
1989–90 Cup Winners' Cup			(Bulgaria) CSKA Sofia	1st of 4 teams	(Soviet Union) Žalgiris	(Italy) Virtus Bologna
1991–92 European Cup	(Netherlands) Den Bosch	Bye	1st of 6 teams	Not Played	(Italy) Scaligera	(Greece) PAOK
1996–97 EuroCup	1st of 6 teams	(Germany) Hagen	(Latvia) Riga	(Poland) Śląsk	(France) Racing Paris	(Italy) Scaligera Verona
2003–04 ULEB Cup		2nd of 6 teams	(Spain) Gran Canaria	(Italy) Varese	(Spain) Estudiantes	(Israel) Hapoel Jerusalem
2006–07 ULEB Cup		1st of 6 teams	(Germany) Alba Berlin	(Serbia) Crvena Zvezda	(Russia) UNICS	(Lithuania) Lietuvos rytas
Third tier
Season	Earlier stages	Last 24 / 32	Last 12 / 16	Last 6 / 8	Semifinals	Final
1987–88 Korać Cup		(Belgium) Fleurus	1st of 4 teams	Not played	(Socialist Federal Republic of Yugoslavia) Crvena Zvezda	(Socialist Federal Republic of Yugoslavia) Cibona
1990–91 Korać Cup		(Austria) Wörthersee Piraten	2nd of 4 teams	(Italy) Juvecaserta	(Spain) Joventut	(Italy) Cantù

=== Tenerife ===
Third tier
Season	Earlier stages	Last 24 / 32	Last 12 / 16	Last 6 / 8	Semifinals	Final
2002–03 Champions Cup	1st of 6 teams	2nd of 4 teams				

=== Valencia ===
First tier
Season	Earlier stages	Last 24 / 32	Last 12 / 16	Last 6 / 8	Semifinals	Final
2003–04 Euroleague		3rd of 8 teams	2nd of 4 teams			
2010–11 Euroleague		4th of 6 teams	2nd of 4 teams	(Spain) Real Madrid		
2014–15 Euroleague		6th of 6 teams				
2017–18 EuroLeague			11th of 16 teams			
Second tier
Season	Earlier stages	Last 24 / 32	Last 12 / 16	Last 6 / 8	Semifinals	Final
1998–99 Saporta Cup	1st of 6 teams	(Hungary) Atomerőmű	(Croatia) Split	(Spain) Joventut	(Greece) Aris	(Italy) Treviso
1999–00 Saporta Cup	1st of 6 teams	(Belgium) Spirou	(France) Élan Chalon	(Italy) Virtus Bologna		
2000–01 Saporta Cup		1st of 6 teams	(Turkey) Beşiktaş	(Cyprus) Keravnos	(France) Élan Chalon	
2001–02 Saporta Cup		1st of 6 teams	(Spain) Estudiantes	(Germany) Bonn	(Poland) Włocławek	(Italy) Mens Sana
2002–03 ULEB Cup		2nd of 6 teams	(Germany) Köln	(Croatia) Zadar	(Spain) Estudiantes	(Slovenia) Krka
2004–05 ULEB Cup		1st of 6 teams	(Spain) Joventut	(Belgium) Spirou	(Lithuania) Lietuvos Rytas	
2007–08 ULEB Cup	1st of 6 teams	(Greece) Panionios	(Croatia) Zadar	(Spain) Joventut		
2008–09 Eurocup		1st of 4 teams	1st of 4 teams	(Russia) Khimki		
2009–10 Eurocup	(Belgium) Mons-Hainaut	1st of 4 teams	1st of 4 teams	(Greece) Aris	(Greece) Panellinios	(Germany) Alba Berlin
2011–12 Eurocup		2nd of 4 teams	1st of 4 teams	(Montenegro) Budućnost	(Lithuania) Lietuvos Rytas	(Russia) Khimki
2012–13 Eurocup		1st of 4 teams	2nd of 4 teams	(Russia) UNICS	(Russia) Lokomotiv Kuban	
2013–14 Eurocup	3rd of 6 teams	2nd of 4 teams	(Russia) Khimki	(Germany) Alba Berlin	(Russia) Nizhny Novgorod	(Russia) UNICS
2014–15 Eurocup		2nd of 4 teams	(Germany) Bayern Munich	(Russia) Khimki		
2015–16 Eurocup	1st of 6 teams	3rd of 4 teams				
2016–17 EuroCup		1st of 5 teams	1st of 4 teams	(Russia) Khimki	(Israel) Hapoel Jerusalem	(Spain) Málaga
2018–19 EuroCup		1st of 6 teams	2nd of 4 teams	(Lithuania) Rytas	(Russia) UNICS	(Germany) Alba Berlin

=== Valladolid ===
Third tier
Season	Earlier stages	Last 24 / 32	Last 12 / 16	Last 6 / 8	Semifinals	Final
1979–80 Korać Cup	(Portugal) Sangalhos	(Scotland) Dalkeith	3rd of 4 teams			
1981–82 Korać Cup		(Belgium) Mechelen	3rd of 4 teams			
1982–83 Korać Cup	(Switzerland) Nyon					
1991–92 Korać Cup	(Netherlands) Weert	(Belgium) Leuven	1st of 4 teams	(Croatia) Zadar	(Italy) Virtus Roma	
1992–93 Korać Cup	(Turkey) Tofaş					
1998–99 Korać Cup	2nd of 4 teams	(Turkey) Beşiktaş				
2001–02 Korać Cup	(Portugal) Madeira	4th of 4 teams				

=== YMCA España ===
Third tier
Season	Earlier stages	Last 24 / 32	Last 12 / 16	Last 6 / 8	Semifinals	Final
1974–75 Korać Cup	(Scotland) Paisley	(France) Antibes				

=== Basket Zaragoza ===
Second tier
Season	Earlier stages	Last 24 / 32	Last 12 / 16	Last 6 / 8	Semifinals	Final
2013–14 Eurocup	3rd of 6 teams	4th of 4 teams				
2014–15 Eurocup	4th of 6 teams	4th of 4 teams				
2015–16 Eurocup	2nd of 6 teams	2nd of 4 teams	(Italy) Aquila Trento			
Third tier
Season	Earlier stages	Last 24 / 32	Last 12 / 16	Last 6 / 8	Semifinals	Final
2019–20 Champions League		1st of 8 teams				

=== CB Zaragoza ===
Second tier
Season	Earlier stages	Last 24 / 32	Last 12 / 16	Last 6 / 8	Semifinals	Final
1984–85 Cup Winners' Cup				2nd of 4 teams	(Spain) Barcelona	
1990–91 Cup Winners' Cup			(West Germany) Bayreuth	1st of 4 teams	(France) Cholet	(Greece) PAOK
1992–93 European Cup	(Germany) Bamberg	(Netherlands) Den Bosch	2nd of 6 teams	Not Played	(Greece) Aris	
Third tier
Season	Earlier stages	Last 24 / 32	Last 12 / 16	Last 6 / 8	Semifinals	Final
1977–78 Korać Cup		(Italy) Olimpia Milano				
1982–83 Korać Cup		(Hungary) Zalaegerszeg	2nd of 4 teams			
1983–84 Korać Cup		(Greece) Olympiacos	1st of 4 teams	Not played	(Socialist Federal Republic of Yugoslavia) Crvena Zvezda	
1985–86 Korać Cup	(England) Manchester Giants	(Israel) Hapoel Tel Aviv				
1986–87 Korać Cup		(Belgium) Maccabi Brussels	1st of 4 teams	Not played	(France) Limoges	
1987–88 Korać Cup		(West Germany) Charlottenburg	4th of 4 teams			
1988–89 Korać Cup		(Turkey) Galatasaray	3rd of 4 teams			
1989–90 Korać Cup	(Switzerland) Nyon	(France) Monaco	3rd of 4 teams			
1991–92 Korać Cup	(England) Leicester Riders	(Hungary) Tungsram	3rd of 4 teams			
1993–94 Korać Cup	(Turkey) Galatasaray	(Ukraine) Kharkiv	4th of 4 teams			
1995–96 Korać Cup	(Portugal) Beira-Mar	(Russia) Samara	4th of 4 teams			

== See also ==
European basketball clubs in European and worldwide competitions:

- Croatia
- Czechoslovakia
- France
- Greece
- Israel
- Italy
- Russia
- Turkey
- USSR
- Yugoslavia
