= 2026–27 EuroCup Basketball =

European basketball competition

2026–27 BKT EuroCup^{1}
- Season: 2026–27
- Teams: 32
- ^{1} Sponsored name, referring to BKT.

The 2026–27 EuroCup Basketball season is the 25th season of Euroleague Basketball's secondary level professional club basketball tournament. It is the 19th season since it was renamed from the ULEB Cup to the EuroCup, and the fourth season under the title sponsorship name of BKT.

Cosea JL Bourg are the defending champions after refusing to promote to the 2026–27 EuroLeague via spot granted to the title holders.

== Format changes ==
On 9 June 2026, Euroleague Basketball gave the green light to expand the league to 32 teams after receiving an outstanding interest with more than 40 applicants to join the league. Therefore, it was approved to divide the regular season into four groups of eight teams. From the regular season onwards, the top four teams from each group will advance to the Playoffs that will be played in best-of-three series from eighthfinals to the finals.

== Team allocation ==
A total of 32 teams from 16 countries participate in the 2026–27 EuroCup season. On 9 June 2026, Euroleague Basketball approved to expand the league, choosing entries from more than 40 applicants and deciding between either awarding long-term through five–year licenses with at least three years guaranteed or a sporting merit-based one–year wild card spot – depending on an applicant. On 12 June 2026, Euroleague Basketball announced a provisional list of 31 participating teams. On 26 June 2026, Euroleague Basketball announced the complete list of the teams. On 1 September 2026, Bosna BH Telecom replaced AS Monaco in the regular season after the team from the Principality were excluded from French professional basketball competitions.

=== Teams ===
League positions after the playoffs of the previous season are shown in parentheses (TH: EuroCup title holders).

Qualified teams for 2026–27 EuroCup Basketball (by license type)
Five–year license
(Basketball Federation of Montenegro) Budućnost VOLI (4th)	(German Basketball Federation) Skyliners Frankfurt (15th)	(French Federation of Basketball) Cosea JL Bourg (7th)^{TH}	(Turkish Basketball Federation) Bahçeşehir Koleji (3rd)
(Romanian Basketball Federation) U-BT Cluj-Napoca (5th)	(Italian Basketball Federation) Umana Reyer Venezia (2nd)	(Hellenic Basketball Federation) PAOK (3rd)	(Turkish Basketball Federation) Türk Telekom (5th)
(Basketball Federation of Slovenia) Cedevita Olimpija (6th)	(Italian Basketball Federation) Baglietto Derthona (5th)	(Hellenic Basketball Federation) Aris (5th)	(Israeli Basketball Association) Hapoel Midtown Jerusalem (3rd)
(German Basketball Federation) ratiopharm Ulm (6th)	(Italian Basketball Federation) Dolomiti Energia Trento (8th)	(Lithuanian Basketball Federation) Neptūnas (3rd)	(Spanish Basketball Federation) La Laguna Tenerife (4th)
(German Basketball Federation) Niners Chemnitz (12th)	(French Federation of Basketball) Le Mans Sarthe (6th)	(Lithuanian Basketball Federation) Lietkabelis (4th)	(British Basketball) London Lions (1st)
One–year participation
(Italian Basketball Federation) Maxima Roma (4th)	(Spanish Basketball Federation) Kids&Us Manresa (10th)	(Bulgarian Basketball Federation) Balkan Botevgrad (1st)	(Lithuanian Basketball Federation) Šiauliai (6th)
(Italian Basketball Federation) Napoli Basketball (10th)	(Spanish Basketball Federation) Recoletas Salud Burgos (13th)	(German Basketball Federation) Rostock Seawolves (9th)	(Polish Basketball Federation) Śląsk Wrocław (6th)
(Italian Basketball Federation) Roma (11th)	(Basketball Federation of Bosnia and Herzegovina) Bosna BH Telecom (7th)	(Latvian Basketball Association) Rīgas Zeļļi (3rd)	(Turkish Basketball Federation) Tofaş (10th)

Notes

1. ABA League (ABA): Budućnost VOLI, U-BT Cluj-Napoca, Cedevita Olimpija, and Bosna BH Telecom are clubs representing the ABA League.

== Round and draw dates ==
The schedule of the competition is as follows.

Schedule for 2026–27 EuroCup Basketball
Phase	Round	Draw date	First leg	Second leg	Third leg
Regular season	Round 1	8 July 2026	29–30 September 2026		
Regular season	Round 2	8 July 2026	6–7 October 2026		
Regular season	Round 3	8 July 2026	13–14 October 2026		
Regular season	Round 4	8 July 2026	20–21 October 2026		
Regular season	Round 5	8 July 2026	27–28 October 2026		
Regular season	Round 6	8 July 2026	3–4 November 2026		
Regular season	Round 7	8 July 2026	10–11 November 2026		
Regular season	Round 8	8 July 2026	17–18 November 2026		
Regular season	Round 9	8 July 2026	8–9 December 2026		
Regular season	Round 10	8 July 2026	15–16 December 2026		
Regular season	Round 11	8 July 2026	22–23 December 2026		
Regular season	Round 12	8 July 2026	29–30 December 2026		
Regular season	Round 13	8 July 2026	5–6 January 2027		
Regular season	Round 14	8 July 2026	12–13 January 2027		
Playoffs	Eighthfinals	8 July 2026	2–3 February 2027	9 February 2027	12 February 2027
Playoffs	Quarterfinals	8 July 2026	9–10 March 2027	16 March 2027	19 March 2027
Playoffs	Semifinals	8 July 2026	31 March 2027	6 April 2027	9 April 2027
Playoffs	Finals	8 July 2026	21 April 2027	27 April 2027	30 April 2027

=== Draw ===
The draw was held on 8 July 2026 in Barcelona, Spain.

The 32 teams were drawn into four groups of eight, with the restriction that teams from the same league could not be drawn against each other, except when there are more than four teams from the same league participating in the regular season. For the draw, the teams were seeded into 8 pots, in accordance with the Club Ranking, based on their performance in European competitions during a three-year period and the lowest possible position that any club from that league can occupy in the draw is calculated by adding the results of the worst performing team from each league.

Pot 1 Team (French Federation of Basketball) Cosea JL Bourg (French Federation of Basketball) ~~AS Monaco~~ (French Federation of Basketball) Le Mans Sarthe (Turkish Basketball Federation) Türk Telekom	Pot 2 Team (Israeli Basketball Association) Hapoel Midtown Jerusalem (Romanian Basketball Federation) U-BT Cluj-Napoca (Turkish Basketball Federation) Bahçeşehir Koleji (Turkish Basketball Federation) Tofaş	Pot 3 Team (Spanish Basketball Federation) Kids&Us Manresa (Spanish Basketball Federation) La Laguna Tenerife (Spanish Basketball Federation) Recoletas Salud Burgos (Basketball Federation of Montenegro) Budućnost VOLI	Pot 4 Team (Italian Basketball Federation) Umana Reyer Venezia (Basketball Federation of Slovenia) Cedevita Olimpija (Italian Basketball Federation) Dolomiti Energia Trento (German Basketball Federation) ratiopharm Ulm
Pot 5 Team (Italian Basketball Federation) Baglietto Derthona (Italian Basketball Federation) Napoli Basketball (Italian Basketball Federation) Maxima Roma (Italian Basketball Federation) Roma	Pot 6 Team (Hellenic Basketball Federation) Aris (Lithuanian Basketball Federation) Lietkabelis (Lithuanian Basketball Federation) Neptūnas (Lithuanian Basketball Federation) Šiauliai	Pot 7 Team (Hellenic Basketball Federation) PAOK (British Basketball) London Lions (German Basketball Federation) Niners Chemnitz (German Basketball Federation) Rostock Seawolves	Pot 8 Team (German Basketball Federation) Skyliners Frankfurt (Polish Basketball Federation) Śląsk Wrocław (Bulgarian Basketball Federation) Balkan Botevgrad (Latvian Basketball Association) Rīgas Zeļļi

== Regular season ==
Location of teams of the 2026–27 EuroCup regular season.
Red: Group A; Green: Group B; Blue: Group C; Yellow: Group D.

The regular season began on 29 September 2026 and will conclude on 13 January 2027. In each group, teams play against each other home-and-away in a round-robin format where 16 teams will advance to the playoffs. Moreover, the top four teams in each regular season group will qualify to the eighthfinals, while the bottom four teams from each group will be eliminated after the regular season.

Alongside 17 returning teams from last season, Tofaş return seven years later, Skyliners Frankfurt return eight years later, Le Mans Sarthe and PAOK return 11 years later, Šiauliai return 16 years later, Bosna BH Telecom return 19 years later, while Baglietto Derthona, Balkan Botevgrad, La Laguna Tenerife, Maxima Roma, Napoli Basketball, Recoletas Salud Burgos, Rīgas Zeļļi, Roma and Rostock Seawolves make their debut appearance in the EuroCup.

=== Group A ===
Pos	Team	Pld	W	L	PF	PA	PD	Qualification	JLM	ARI	MSB	RIG	COL	DER	ROS	BUR
1	(Israeli Basketball Association) Hapoel Midtown Jerusalem	8	8	0	710	598	+112	Advance to eighthfinals	—	84–73		100–64			94–73	
2	(Hellenic Basketball Federation) Aris	8	7	1	730	625	+105	Advance to eighthfinals		—	96–86	105–81	78–73	88–68		93–80
3	(French Federation of Basketball) Le Mans Sarthe	8	4	4	651	643	+8	Advance to eighthfinals	83–90	74–87	—				82–70	88–80
4	(Latvian Basketball Association) Rīgas Zeļļi	8	4	4	646	689	−43	Advance to eighthfinals			65–71	—	89–79	86–84		
5	(Basketball Federation of Slovenia) Cedevita Olimpija	8	3	5	592	609	−17		64–75		66–84		—	73–71		76–62
6	(Italian Basketball Federation) Baglietto Derthona	8	3	5	650	671	−21		77–91		89–83	92–96		—	86–83	89–79
7	(German Basketball Federation) Rostock Seawolves	8	2	6	629	696	−67		80–91	79–110		87–86	71–88		—	
8	(Spanish Basketball Federation) Recoletas Salud Burgos	8	1	7	600	677	−77		84–85			71–79	85–81		59–86	—

Updated to match(es) played on 18 November 2026. Source: EuroCup
Legend: Blue = home team win; Red = away team win.
Rules for classification: All points scored in extra period(s) will not be counted in the standings, nor for any tie-break situation.

=== Group B ===
Pos	Team	Pld	W	L	PF	PA	PD	Qualification	LLT	LDN	URV	RMA	TTA	SIA	SKY	UBT
1	(Spanish Basketball Federation) La Laguna Tenerife	8	7	1	731	641	+90	Advance to eighthfinals	—		82–80	96–71	82–75			113–73
2	(British Basketball) London Lions	8	5	3	628	572	+56	Advance to eighthfinals	89–77	—	80–76		79–61	68–55	76–81	
3	(Italian Basketball Federation) Umana Reyer Venezia	8	4	4	711	661	+50	Advance to eighthfinals			—		75–65	98–77	104–72	
4	(Italian Basketball Federation) Maxima Roma	8	4	4	688	672	+16	Advance to eighthfinals		86–84	90–79	—				89–55
5	(Turkish Basketball Federation) Türk Telekom	8	3	5	652	657	−5		88–91			92–77	—	84–94	98–78	
6	(Lithuanian Basketball Federation) Šiauliai	8	3	5	615	673	−58		71–86	74–71		98–93		—		75–93
7	(German Basketball Federation) Skyliners Frankfurt	8	3	5	703	770	−67		94–104		97–107	89–113		79–71	—	113–97
8	(Romanian Basketball Federation) U-BT Cluj-Napoca	8	3	5	657	739	−82			72–89	98–92	87–79	81–89			—

Updated to match(es) played on 18 November 2026. Source: EuroCup
Legend: Blue = home team win; Red = away team win.
Rules for classification: All points scored in extra period(s) will not be counted in the standings, nor for any tie-break situation.

=== Group C ===
Pos	Team	Pld	W	L	PF	PA	PD	Qualification	TOF	NAP	BUD	NIN	JLB	TRE	NEP	WKS
1	(Turkish Basketball Federation) Tofaş	8	7	1	728	653	+75	Advance to eighthfinals	—		90–85	82–69			94–79	
2	(Italian Basketball Federation) Napoli Basketball	8	7	1	731	671	+60	Advance to eighthfinals	105–101	—			84–76	90–79		
3	(Basketball Federation of Montenegro) Budućnost VOLI	8	5	3	713	679	+34	Advance to eighthfinals		75–93	—	96–84			104–89	94–88
4	(German Basketball Federation) Niners Chemnitz	8	4	4	700	692	+8	Advance to eighthfinals	85–94	90–112		—	96–77		93–84	95–67
5	(French Federation of Basketball) Cosea JL Bourg	8	3	5	659	672	−13		82–89	91–79	66–68		—	90–79		
6	(Italian Basketball Federation) Dolomiti Energia Trento	8	3	5	671	706	−35		86–96		94–92	80–88		—	96–83	81–94
7	(Lithuanian Basketball Federation) Neptūnas	8	2	6	676	728	−52			85–94			93–89	73–76	—	90–82
8	(Polish Basketball Federation) Śląsk Wrocław	8	1	7	646	723	−77		74–90	82–86	75–99		84–88			—

Updated to match(es) played on 18 November 2026. Source: EuroCup
Legend: Blue = home team win; Red = away team win.
Rules for classification: All points scored in extra period(s) will not be counted in the standings, nor for any tie-break situation.

=== Group D ===
Pos	Team	Pld	W	L	PF	PA	PD	Qualification	BKS	PBC	MAN	ULM	BOS	ROM	LIE	BLK
1	(Turkish Basketball Federation) Bahçeşehir Koleji	8	7	1	739	607	+132	Advance to eighthfinals	—	84–81	100–88			91–78	99–61	
2	(Hellenic Basketball Federation) PAOK	8	6	2	702	654	+48	Advance to eighthfinals		—	93–78	87–78		113–111		
3	(Spanish Basketball Federation) Kids&Us Manresa	8	5	3	697	671	+26	Advance to eighthfinals		80–88	—	101–89	86–82	108–88		
4	(German Basketball Federation) ratiopharm Ulm	8	3	5	691	698	−7	Advance to eighthfinals	82–96			—	102–93			98–84
5	(Basketball Federation of Bosnia and Herzegovina) Bosna BH Telecom	8	3	5	650	657	−7		86–77	72–75			—		91–84	69–78
6	(Italian Basketball Federation) Roma	8	3	5	671	723	−52		70–92			83–78	80–85	—	92–87	77–72
7	(Lithuanian Basketball Federation) Lietkabelis	8	3	5	600	663	−63			95–86	66–80	68–86	75–72		—	
8	(Bulgarian Basketball Federation) Balkan Botevgrad	8	2	6	556	633	−77		60–101	56–79	65–76	86–78			57–64	—

Updated to match(es) played on 18 November 2026. Source: EuroCup
Legend: Blue = home team win; Red = away team win.
Rules for classification: All points scored in extra period(s) will not be counted in the standings, nor for any tie-break situation.

== Awards ==
All official awards of the 2026–27 EuroCup.

=== MVP of the Round ===
Regular season

Round	Player	Team	PIR	Ref.
1	(United States) Darius Brown	(Italian Basketball Federation) Dolomiti Energia Trento	29	
2	(Canada) Thomas Kennedy	(British Basketball) London Lions	34	
3	(United States) Kenneth Lofton Jr.	(Israeli Basketball Association) Hapoel Midtown Jerusalem	33	
4	(United States) Kyle Guy	(Spanish Basketball Federation) La Laguna Tenerife	30	
4	(Canada) Nick Ongenda	(Spanish Basketball Federation) Kids&Us Manresa	30	
5	(United States) Darius Brown (2)	(Italy) Dolomiti Energia Trento	31	
5	(United States) Joel Scott	(United Kingdom) London Lions	31	
6	(Turkey) Doğuş Özdemiroğlu	(Turkish Basketball Federation) Türk Telekom	28	
7	(Croatia) Miro Bilan	(Italian Basketball Federation) Maxima Roma	34	
8	(United States) Javante McCoy	(Bulgarian Basketball Federation) Balkan Botevgrad	40	

== See also ==
- 2026–27 EuroLeague
- 2026–27 Basketball Champions League
- 2026–27 FIBA Europe Cup
