= 2003–04 ULEB Cup =

Basketball tournament

- Season: 2003–04
- Teams: 36 (competition proper)

Finals
- Champions: (Israel) Hapoel Jerusalem (1st title)
- Runners-up: (Spain) Real Madrid
- Finals MVP: (Russia) Kelly McCarty

Statistical leaders
Points	(United States) Rasheed Brokenborough	26.6
Rebounds	(Netherlands) Geert Hammink	11.5
Assists	(Croatia) Ivan Tomas	4.8
Index Rating	(Bulgaria) Priest Lauderdale	28.0

The 2003–04 ULEB Cup was the second season of the second-tier level European professional club basketball competition, EuroCup Basketball, organized by the Euroleague Basketball Company. The EuroCup is the European-wide league level that is one tier below the EuroLeague level. Thirty-six teams participated in thus expanded edition, including 7 league champions. The final was held on April 13, in Charleroi, Belgium, between Real Madrid and Hapoel Jerusalem, the latter winning it by a score of 83–72.

== Team allocation ==
For the first time teams from Israel, Lithuania, Greece, Latvia, Bulgaria, Poland, Austria and England joined the competition which was undisputedly considered now the 2nd tier of European club basketball. Three out of the 36 teams were domestic champions.

=== Teams ===
Country	Teams	Clubs (ranking in national league)					
Spain	6	Adecco Estudiantes (4th)	Auna Gran Canaria (5th)	DKV Joventut (7th)	Etosa Alicante (8th)	Real Madrid (10th)	Caprabo Lleida (11th)
Germany	4	Telekom Bonn (1st)	Energy Braunschweig (3rd)	RheinEnergie Köln (4th)	Opel Skyliners (5th)		
(Serbia and Montenegro) Serbia & Montenegro	4	Reflex (2nd)	Crvena zvezda (3rd)	Budućnost (4th)	Atlas		
Croatia	3	Split CO (1st)	Zadar (2nd)	Zagreb (3rd)			
France	3	Le Mans (3rd)	Gravelines-Dunkerque (4th)	Cholet (5th)			
Italy	3	Breil Milano (5th)	Metis Varese (12th)	Carisbo Virtus Bologna (15th)			
Belgium	2	Spirou (1st)	Verviers-Pepinster (4th)				
Greece	2	Ionikos Egnatia Bank (8th)	Makedonikos (10th)				
Netherlands	2	Demon Ricoh Astronauts (2nd)	EiffelTowers Nijmegen (5th)				
Austria	1	Superfund Bulls (1st)					
Bulgaria	1	Lukoil Academic (1st)					
England	1	Brighton Bears (2nd)					
Israel	1	Hapoel Jerusalem (8th)					
Latvia	1	Ventspils (1st)					
Lithuania	1	Lietuvos rytas (2nd)					
Poland	1	Prokom Trefl Sopot (2nd)					

== Format ==
The 2003–04 ULEB Cup featured a total of 36 teams, divided into six groups of six. The round-robin group stage was followed by knock-out stages. The regular season began in November 2003.

=== Regular season ===
All 36 teams in 6 groups played a round-robin competition, home and away. Two teams from each group advanced to the knockout stage (eighth-finals). Four teams with best third place records in their respective groups also advanced to the knockout stage.

=== Eighth-finals ===
The winners from the eighthfinals advanced to the quarterfinals. The matches were played as two games, home and away. The match winners were determined by point differential.

=== Quarterfinals ===
The winners from the quarterfinals advanced to the semifinals. The matches were played as two games, home and away. The match winners were determined by point differential.

=== Semifinals ===
The winners from the semifinals advanced to the finals. The matches were played as two games, home and away. The match winners were determined by point differential.

=== Final ===
The match was played as one game.

== Regular season ==
Key to colors
Top two places in each group, plus highest-ranked third-place team, advance to Top 16

=== Group A ===
	Team	Pld	W	L	PF	PA	Diff
1.	(Italy) Breil Milano	10	8	2	787	684	103
2.	(Spain) Real Madrid	10	7	3	804	728	76
3.	(Bulgaria) Lukoil Academic	10	7	3	855	828	27
4.	(Germany) Opel Skyliners	10	6	4	786	715	71
5.	(Croatia) Zagreb	10	2	8	776	882	-106
6.	(Netherlands) Demon Ricoh Astronauts	10	0	10	656	827	-171

=== Group B ===
	Team	Pld	W	L	PF	PA	Diff
1.	(Spain) Caprabo Lleida	10	8	2	796	729	67
2.	(Spain) Auna Gran Canaria	10	7	3	770	670	100
3.	(Germany) RheinEnergie Köln	10	6	4	740	785	-45
4.	(Croatia) Zadar	10	5	5	773	734	39
5.	(Serbia and Montenegro) Atlas	10	3	7	748	774	-26
6.	(Austria) Superfund Bulls	10	1	9	710	845	-135

=== Group C ===
	Team	Pld	W	L	PF	PA	Diff
1.	(Italy) Metis Varese	10	7	3	844	770	74
2.	(Latvia) Ventspils	10	7	3	811	772	39
3.	(Belgium) Spirou	10	6	4	756	759	-3
4.	(Serbia and Montenegro) Crvena zvezda	10	5	5	819	815	4
5.	(Spain) Etosa Alicante	10	3	7	769	820	-51
6.	(France) Gravelines-Dunkerque	10	2	8	705	768	-63

=== Group D ===
	Team	Pld	W	L	PF	PA	Diff
1.	(Serbia and Montenegro) Reflex	10	9	1	806	714	92
2.	(Israel) Hapoel Jerusalem	10	6	4	833	800	33
3.	(Spain) DKV Joventut	10	6	4	801	781	20
4.	(Belgium) Go Pass Verviers-Pepinster	10	3	7	755	779	-24
5.	(Italy) Carisbo Virtus Bologna	10	3	7	769	816	-53
6.	(Germany) Telekom Bonn	10	3	7	747	815	-68

=== Group E ===
	Team	Pld	W	L	PF	PA	Diff
1.	(Spain) Adecco Estudiantes	10	9	1	833	728	105
2.	(Greece) Makedonikos	10	6	4	778	786	-8
3.	(France) Le Mans	10	5	5	791	773	18
4.	(Serbia and Montenegro) Budućnost	10	5	5	820	835	-15
5.	(Netherlands) EiffelTowers Nijmegen	10	3	7	818	832	-14
6.	(Germany) Energy Braunschweig	10	2	8	769	855	-86

=== Group F ===
	Team	Pld	W	L	PF	PA	Diff
1.	(Lithuania) Lietuvos rytas	10	8	2	786	660	126
2.	(Poland) Prokom Trefl Sopot	10	7	3	790	696	94
3.	(England) Brighton Bears	10	4	6	791	807	-16
4.	(Croatia) Split CO	10	4	6	792	868	-76
5.	(France) Cholet	10	4	6	762	817	-55
6.	(Greece) Ionikos Egnatia Bank	10	3	7	794	867	-73

== Elimination rounds ==
=== Bracket ===
Top16
(Greece) Makedonikos	89	58	147
(Spain) Caprabo Lleida	63	90	153
(Belgium) Spirou	56	91	147
(Spain) Adecco Estudiantes	74	84	158
(Spain) Real Madrid	87	61	148
(Spain) Auna Gran Canaria	68	63	131
(Germany) RheinEnergie Köln	81	62	143
(Italy) Metis Varese	70	81	151
(Latvia) Ventspils	68	89	157
(Serbia and Montenegro) Reflex	79	95	174
(Spain) DKV Joventut	78	69	147
(Italy) Breil Milano	62	81	143
(Israel) Hapoel Jerusalem	77	82	159
(Poland) Prokom Trefl Sopot	67	86	153
(Bulgaria) Lukoil Academic	77	78	155
(Lithuania) Lietuvos rytas	80	105	185

Quarterfinals
(Spain) Caprabo Lleida	82	68	150
(Spain) Adecco Estudiantes	73	96	169
(Spain) Real Madrid	68	62	130
(Italy) Metis Varese	67	57	124
(Serbia and Montenegro) Reflex	81	79	160
(Spain) DKV Joventut	73	83	156
(Israel) Hapoel Jerusalem	79	80	159
(Lithuania) Lietuvos rytas	72	81	153

Semifinals
(Spain) Adecco Estudiantes	75	73	148
(Spain) Real Madrid	83	82	165
(Serbia and Montenegro) Reflex	70	76	146
(Israel) Hapoel Jerusalem	69	79	148

Finals
(Spain) Real Madrid	72
(Israel) Hapoel Jerusalem	83

Source: ULEB Cup

== Top 16 ==
Team 1	Agg.	Team 2	1st leg	2nd leg
Makedonikos (Greece)	147–153	(Spain) Caprabo Lleida	89–63	58–90
Spirou (Belgium)	147–158	(Spain) Adecco Estudiantes	56–74	91–84
Real Madrid (Spain)	148–131	(Spain) Auna Gran Canaria	87–68	61–63
RheinEnergie Köln (Germany)	143–151	(Italy) Metis Varese	81–70	62–81
Ventspils (Latvia)	157–174	(Serbia and Montenegro) Reflex	68–79	89–95
DKV Joventut (Spain)	147–143	(Italy) Breil Milano	78–62	69–81
Hapoel Jerusalem (Israel)	159–153	(Poland) Prokom Trefl Sopot	77–67	82–86
Lukoil Academic (Bulgaria)	155–185	(Lithuania) Lietuvos rytas	77–80	78–105

== Quarterfinals ==
Team 1	Agg.	Team 2	1st leg	2nd leg
Hapoel Jerusalem (Israel)	159–153	(Lithuania) Lietuvos rytas	79–72	80–81
Caprabo Lleida (Spain)	150–169	(Spain) Adecco Estudiantes	82–73	68–96
Real Madrid (Spain)	130–124	(Italy) Metis Varese	68–67	62–57
Reflex (Serbia and Montenegro)	160–156	(Spain) DKV Joventut	81–73	79–83

== Semifinals ==
Team 1	Agg.	Team 2	1st leg	2nd leg
Reflex (Serbia and Montenegro)	146–148	(Israel) Hapoel Jerusalem	70–69	76–79
Adecco Estudiantes (Spain)	148–165	(Spain) Real Madrid	75–83	73–82

== Final ==
April 13, Spiroudome, Charleroi

Team 1	Score	Team 2
Real Madrid (Spain)	72–83	(Israel) Hapoel Jerusalem

2003–04 ULEB Cup Champions

Hapoel Jerusalem
1st title

== Finals MVP ==
- (United States) Kelly McCarty (Hapoel Jerusalem)
