= 2005–06 ULEB Cup =

Basketball competition

- Season: 2005–06
- Teams: 24 (competition proper)

Finals
- Champions: (Russia) Dynamo Moscow (1st title)
- Runners-up: (Greece) Aris TT Bank
- Finals MVP: (Panama) Ruben Douglas

Statistical leaders
Points	(United States) Horace Jenkins	20.4
Rebounds	(United States) Mario Austin	9.4
Assists	(United States) Lamont Jones	6.3
Index Rating	(United States) Mario Austin	22.6

The 2005–06 ULEB Cup was the fourth season of the second-tier level European professional club basketball competition, the EuroCup. The EuroCup is the European-wide league level that is one tier below the EuroLeague level. Dynamo Moscow won the trophy, by defeating Aris TT Bank in the final, by a score of 73–60.

== Teams ==
Country	Teams	Clubs		
(Serbia and Montenegro) Serbia & Montenegro	3	Hemofarm	FMP	Crvena zvezda
Belgium	2	Eyphony Bree	Spirou	
France	2	Le Mans	Adecco ASVEL	
Germany	2	Alba Berlin	Deutsche Bank Skyliners	
Greece	2	Panionios Forthnet	Aris TT Bank	
Italy	2	Lottomatica Roma	Landi Renzo Reggio Emilia	
Russia	2	Dynamo Moscow	UNICS	
Spain	2	Adecco Estudiantes	Etosa Alicante	
Bulgaria	1	Lukoil Academic		
Israel	1	Hapoel Jerusalem		
Latvia	1	Ventspils		
Netherlands	1	Demon Ricoh Astronauts		
Poland	1	Anwil Włocławek		
Portugal	1	Queluz		
Turkey	1	Beşiktaş Cola Turka		

== Regular season ==
Key to colors
Top four places in each group advance to Top 16

=== Group A ===
Pos	Team	Pld	W	L	PF	PA	PD	Pts	Qualification	ARI	LUK	BRE	VEN	EST	ALB
1	(Greece) Aris TT Bank	10	7	3	827	785	+42	17	Advance to Top 16	—	97–91	81–74	96–78	73–69	97–80
2	(Bulgaria) Lukoil Academic	10	6	4	827	826	+1	16	Advance to Top 16	66–65	—	79–76	90–85	88–83	108–88
3	(Belgium) Eyphony Bree	10	5	5	787	778	+9	15	Advance to Top 16	69–64	87–75	—	74–63	78–80	82–74
4	(Latvia) Ventspils	10	5	5	811	807	+4	15	Advance to Top 16	96–76	82–69	79–69	—	79–78	88–78
5	(Spain) Adecco Estudiantes	10	4	6	833	849	−16	14		76–89	85–87	96–87	86–83	—	92–84
6	(Germany) Alba Berlin	10	3	7	847	887	−40	13		86–89	78–74	87–91	91–78	101–88	—

Source: Eurocup basketball
Legend: Blue = home team win; Red = away team win.

=== Group B ===
Pos	Team	Pld	W	L	PF	PA	PD	Pts	Qualification	REG	HEM	ASV	PAN	ANW	AMS
1	(Italy) Landi Renzo Reggio Emilia	10	7	3	791	705	+86	17	Advance to Top 16	—	83–62	82–66	67–61	83–78	93–59
2	(Serbia and Montenegro) Hemofarm	10	7	3	756	703	+53	17	Advance to Top 16	78–69	—	74–77	79–71	80–67	84–63
3	(France) Adecco ASVEL	10	6	4	743	722	+21	16	Advance to Top 16	81–73	78–80	—	83–61	61–49	82–72
4	(Greece) Panionios Forthnet	10	4	6	710	746	−36	14	Advance to Top 16	79–75	65–82	76–79	—	70–62	79–74
5	(Poland) Anwil Włocławek	10	3	7	667	711	−44	13		79–85	50–62	79–78	65–58	—	72–67
6	(Netherlands) Demon Ricoh Astronauts	10	3	7	700	780	−80	13		62–81	80–75	76–58	80–90	67–66	—

Source: Eurocup basketball
Legend: Blue = home team win; Red = away team win.

=== Group C ===
Pos	Team	Pld	W	L	PF	PA	PD	Pts	Qualification	UNI	FMP	ALI	SPI	BEŞ	QUE
1	(Russia) UNICS	10	9	1	814	640	+174	19	Advance to Top 16	—	90–65	79–62	88–57	82–58	97–60
2	(Serbia and Montenegro) FMP Železnik	10	7	3	730	730	0	17	Advance to Top 16	70–67	—	70–62	62–44	63–60	96–72
3	(Spain) Etosa Alicante	10	5	5	750	704	+46	15	Advance to Top 16	66–73	78–84	—	72–55	75–65	86–62
4	(Belgium) Spirou	10	5	5	664	680	−16	15	Advance to Top 16	59–61	77–59	71–64	—	71–56	85–70
5	(Turkey) Beşiktaş Cola Turka	10	3	7	723	754	−31	13		75–88	89–67	87–93	79–56	—	79–67
6	(Portugal) Queluz	10	1	9	709	882	−173	11		68–89	91–94	58–92	69–89	92–75	—

Source: Eurocup basketball
Legend: Blue = home team win; Red = away team win.

=== Group D ===
	(Russia) DYN	(Israel) JER	(Serbia and Montenegro) CZV	(Italy) ROM	(France) LEM	(Germany) SKY
(Russia) DYN		86-68	83-77	82-70	69-67	75-61
(Israel) JER	87-83		103-77	84-95	88-84	80-65
(Serbia and Montenegro) CZV	80-86	82-94		89-72	85-73	91-57
(Italy) ROM	72-97	91-94	94-88		65-78	86-76
(France) LEM	76-70	78-66	70-79	67-83		88-66
(Germany) SKY	49-73	82-95	62-89	50-54	57-85	

	Team	Pld	W	L	PF	PA	Diff
1.	(Russia) Dynamo Moscow	10	8	2	804	707	97
2.	(Israel) Hapoel Jerusalem	10	7	3	859	823	36
3.	(Serbia and Montenegro) Crvena zvezda	10	5	5	837	794	43
4.	(Italy) Lottomatica Roma	10	5	5	782	805	-23
5.	(France) Le Mans	10	5	5	766	728	38
6.	(Germany) Deutsche Bank Skyliners	10	0	10	625	816	-191

== Top 16 ==
Team 1	Agg.	Team 2	1st leg	2nd leg
Panionios Forthnet (Greece)	175–184	(Greece) Aris TT Bank	70–72	105–112(o)*
Crvena zvezda (Serbia and Montenegro)	173–156	(Bulgaria) Lukoil Academic	91–71	82–85
Ventspils (Latvia)	170–171	(Italy) Landi Renzo Reggio Emilia	87–86	83–85
Etosa Alicante (Spain)	139–148	(Serbia and Montenegro) Hemofarm	72–63	67–85
Lottomatica Roma (Italy)	165–156	(Russia) UNICS	91–86	74–70
Adecco ASVEL (France)	159–145	(Serbia and Montenegro) FMP	90–67	69–78
Spirou (Belgium)	130–168	(Russia) Dynamo Moscow	67–81	63–87
Eyphony Bree (Belgium)	143–150	(Israel) Hapoel Jerusalem	68–69	75–81

- Aris won after two overtimes. Full time 79-81, first overtime 92–94.

== Quarter finals ==
Team 1	Agg.	Team 2	1st leg	2nd leg
Adecco ASVEL (France)	127–144	(Greece) Aris TT Bank	60–67	67–77
Hemofarm (Serbia and Montenegro)	165–147	(Italy) Landi Renzo Reggio Emilia	88–72	77–75
Crvena zvezda (Serbia and Montenegro)	151–173	(Russia) Dynamo Moscow	86–87	65–86
Lottomatica Roma (Italy)	148–158	(Israel) Hapoel Jerusalem	92–84	56–74

== Semi finals ==
Team 1	Agg.	Team 2	1st leg	2nd leg
Hemofarm (Serbia and Montenegro)	151–153	(Greece) Aris TT Bank	74–71	77–82
Hapoel Jerusalem (Israel)	164–176	(Russia) Dynamo Moscow	83–84	81–92

== Final ==
April 11, Spiroudome, Charleroi

Team 1	Score	Team 2
Dynamo Moscow (Russia)	73–60	(Greece) Aris TT Bank

2005–06 ULEB Cup Champions

Dynamo Moscow
1st title

== Finals MVP ==
- (Panama) Ruben Douglas (Dynamo Moscow)
