= 2004–05 ULEB Cup =

Basketball championship

- Season: 2004–05
- Teams: 42 (competition proper)

Finals
- Champions: (Lithuania) Lietuvos rytas (1st title)
- Runners-up: (Greece) Makedonikos
- Finals MVP: (Lithuania) Robertas Javtokas

Statistical leaders
Points	(Bulgaria) Todor Stoykov	23.9
Rebounds	(United States) Chris Ensminger	10.7
Assists	(Croatia) Damir Mulaomerović	7.8
Index Rating	(United States) Fred House	23.9

The 2004–05 ULEB Cup was the third season of the second-tier level European professional club basketball competition, the EuroCup, which is organized by the Euroleague Basketball Company. The season started on November 9, 2004, and officially ended on April 19, 2005. The second-tier level EuroCup is the European-wide league level that is one tier below the EuroLeague level. Lietuvos rytas won the trophy, by defeating Makedonikos in the final, by a score of 78–74.

== Teams ==
Country	Teams	Clubs			
France	4	Gravelines-Dunkerque (2nd)	Le Mans (3rd)	Élan Chalon (4th)	Cholet (5th)
Germany	4	GHP Bamberg (2nd)	Alba Berlin (3rd)	Telekom Baskets Bonn (4th)	RheinEnergie Köln (6th)
Greece	4	Maroussi Honda (2nd)	Aris Egnatia Bank (5th)	PAOK (6th)	Makedonikos (9th)
(Serbia and Montenegro) Serbia & Montenegro	4	Hemofarm (2nd)	Crvena zvezda (3rd)	Budućnost (5th)	Reflex (6th)
Belgium	3	Spirou (1st)	Liège (3rd)	Telindus Oostende (4th)	
Italy	3	Pompea Napoli (5th)	Vertical Vision Cantù (6th)	Castigroup Varese (8th)	
Portugal	3	QueluzSintra PM (2nd)	Ovarense Aerosoles (3rd)	Benfica (11th)	
Spain	3	Pamesa Valencia (5th)	Gran Canaria (7th)	DKV Joventut (8th)	
Netherlands	2	MPC Capitals (1st)	EiffelTowers Nijmegen (3rd)		
Turkey	2	Darüşşafaka (6th)	Türk Telekom (9th)		
Austria	1	Kapfenberg Bulls (1st)			
Bulgaria	1	Lukoil Academic (1st)			
Croatia	1	Zadar (2nd)			
Hungary	1	Debreceni Vadkakasok (4th			
Israel	1	Hapoel Jerusalem (5th)			
Latvia	1	Ventspils (1st)			
Lithuania	1	Lietuvos rytas (2nd)			
Poland	1	Deichmann Śląsk Wrocław (2nd)			
Russia	1	Dynamo Moscow (3rd)			
Slovenia	1	Pivovarna Laško (2nd)			

== Format ==
Each group contained 6 teams. There were 7 groups. Each team would play amongst each group twice. Top 2 teams from groups A, C, E, F, and G qualify to eighthfinals. Top 3 teams from groups B and D also qualify to the eighthfinals.

In eighthfinals, each team plays against their selected team twice. The winner of the two games with a higher combined score qualifies to quarterfinals. This procedure repeats in quarterfinals and in semifinals.

== Regular season ==
Key to colors
Top two places in each group, plus highest-ranked third-place team, advance to Top 16

=== Group A ===
	Team	Pld	W	L	PF	PA	Diff
1.	(Greece) PAOK	10	8	2	866	778	88
2.	(Belgium) Spirou Charleroi	10	7	3	790	734	56
3.	(France) Gravelines-Dunkerque	10	5	5	846	846	0
4.	(Germany) Alba Berlin	10	4	6	839	851	-12
5.	(Serbia and Montenegro) Budućnost	10	4	6	801	860	-59
6.	(Hungary) Debreceni Vadkakasok	10	2	8	778	851	-73

=== Group B ===
	Team	Pld	W	L	PF	PA	Diff
1.	(Latvia) Ventspils	10	9	1	929	750	179
2.	(Serbia and Montenegro) Hemofarm	10	6	4	895	806	89
3.	(Germany) RheinEnergie Köln	10	6	4	834	792	42
4.	(France) Le Mans	10	6	4	775	745	30
5.	(Belgium) Liège	10	2	8	776	877	-101
6.	(Netherlands) EiffelTowers Nijmegen	10	1	9	662	901	-239

=== Group C ===
	Team	Pld	W	L	PF	PA	Diff
1.	(Greece) Maroussi Honda	10	7	3	792	738	54
2.	(France) Cholet	10	6	4	740	724	16
3.	(Spain) Gran Canaria	10	6	4	762	724	38
4.	(Croatia) Zadar	10	5	5	783	730	53
5.	(Netherlands) MPC Capitals	10	3	7	714	793	-79
6.	(Belgium) Telindus Oostende	10	3	7	768	850	-82

=== Group D ===
	Team	Pld	W	L	PF	PA	Diff
1.	(Russia) Dynamo Moscow	10	7	3	852	773	79
2.	(Bulgaria) Lukoil Academic	10	7	3	853	837	16
3.	(Greece) Aris Egnatia Bank	10	6	4	848	789	59
4.	(Serbia and Montenegro) Reflex	10	5	5	789	776	13
5.	(Italy) Vertical Vision Cantù	10	5	5	816	820	-4
6.	(Turkey) Türk Telekom	10	0	10	754	917	-163

=== Group E ===
	Team	Pld	W	L	PF	PA	Diff
1.	(Spain) Pamesa Valencia	10	8	2	780	676	104
2.	(Italy) Castigroup Varese	10	7	3	764	758	6
3.	(Israel) Hapoel Jerusalem	10	6	4	786	745	41
4.	(France) Élan Chalon	10	5	5	717	715	2
5.	(Portugal) QueluzSintra PM	10	4	6	762	819	-57
6.	(Portugal) Ovarense Aerosoles	10	0	10	657	753	-96

=== Group F ===
	Team	Pld	W	L	PF	PA	Diff
1.	(Greece) Makedonikos	10	7	3	790	716	74
2.	(Spain) DKV Joventut	10	6	4	812	741	71
3.	(Turkey) Darüşşafaka	10	6	4	748	772	-24
4.	(Slovenia) Pivovarna Laško	10	6	4	793	722	71
5.	(Germany) GHP Bamberg	10	5	5	763	705	58
6.	(Austria) Kapfenberg Bulls	10	0	10	561	811	-250

=== Group G ===
	Team	Pld	W	L	PF	PA	Diff
1.	(Lithuania) Lietuvos rytas	10	9	1	828	667	161
2.	(Poland) Deichmann Śląsk Wrocław	10	6	4	744	797	-53
3.	(Serbia and Montenegro) Crvena zvezda	10	5	5	821	770	51
4.	(Italy) Pompea Napoli	10	5	5	843	828	15
5.	(Germany) Telekom Baskets Bonn	10	5	5	749	773	-24
6.	(Portugal) Benfica	10	0	10	672	822	-150

== Top 16 ==
Team 1	Agg.	Team 2	1st leg	2nd leg
DKV Joventut (Spain)	155–161	(Spain) Pamesa Valencia	70–76	85–85
Lukoil Academic (Bulgaria)	140–157	(Belgium) Spirou Charleroi	73–85	67–72
Cholet (France)	146–152	(Greece) PAOK	75–78	71–74
Aris Egnatia Bank (Greece)	154–156	(Lithuania) Lietuvos rytas	77–75	77–81
Deichmann Śląsk Wrocław (Poland)	133–180	(Greece) Maroussi Honda	61–71	72–109
Castigroup Varese (Italy)	122–167	(Greece) Makedonikos	65–77	57–90
Hemofarm (Serbia and Montenegro)	177–159	(Russia) Dynamo Moscow	81–84	96–75
RheinEnergie Köln (Germany)	151–167	(Latvia) Ventspils	93–77	58–90

== Quarterfinals ==
Team 1	Agg.	Team 2	1st leg	2nd leg
Spirou Charleroi (Belgium)	160–179	(Spain) Pamesa Valencia	78–86	82–93
PAOK (Greece)	139–147	(Lithuania) Lietuvos rytas	74–71	65–76
Maroussi Honda (Greece)	165–167	(Greece) Makedonikos	89–92	76–75
Hemofarm (Serbia and Montenegro)	176–175	(Latvia) Ventspils	99–93	77–82

== Semifinals ==
Team 1	Agg.	Team 2	1st leg	2nd leg
Pamesa Valencia (Spain)	142–150	(Lithuania) Lietuvos rytas	77–75	65–75
Hemofarm (Serbia and Montenegro)	172–180	(Greece) Makedonikos	107–84	65–96

== Finals ==
April 19, Spiroudome, Charleroi

Team 1	Score	Team 2
Lietuvos rytas (Lithuania)	78–74	(Greece) Makedonikos

2004–05 ULEB Cup Champions

Lietuvos rytas
1st title

== Finals MVP ==
- (Lithuania) Robertas Javtokas (Lietuvos rytas)
