= 2006–07 ULEB Cup =

- Season: 2006–07
- Teams: 24 (competition proper)

Finals
- Champions: (Spain) Real Madrid (1st title)
- Runners-up: (Lithuania) Lietuvos rytas
- Finals MVP: (United States) Charles Smith

Statistical leaders
Points	(Serbia) Milan Gurović	25.9
Rebounds	(France) Tariq Kirksay	9.6
Assists	(New Zealand) Mark Dickel	5.7
Index Rating	(Serbia) Milan Gurović	25.5

The 2006–07 ULEB Cup was the fifth season of the second-tier level European professional club basketball competition, the EuroCup. The second-tier level EuroCup is the European-wide league level that is one tier below the EuroLeague level. It featured 24 basketball clubs, from 15 countries. Real Madrid defeated Lietuvos rytas in the final, by a score of 87–75, to lift the trophy.

== Teams of the 2006–07 ULEB Cup ==
Country	Teams	Clubs		
Serbia	3	Hemofarm	FMP	Crvena zvezda
Belgium	2	Telindus Oostende	Dexia Mons-Hainaut	
France	2	Nancy	Strasbourg	
Germany	2	Alba Berlin	Brose Baskets	
Greece	2	PAOK	AEK	
Italy	2	Montepaschi Siena	Snaidero Udine	
Russia	2	Khimki	UNICS	
Spain	2	Real Madrid	Gran Canaria Grupo Dunas	
Bulgaria	1	Lukoil Academic		
Latvia	1	Ventspils		
Lithuania	1	Lietuvos rytas		
Netherlands	1	EiffelTowers EBBC		
Poland	1	Anwil Włocławek		
Turkey	1	Beşiktaş Cola Turka		
Israel	1	Hapoel Jerusalem		

== Format ==
This season's ULEB Cup featured a total of 24 teams, divided into four groups of six. The round-robin group stage was followed by knock-out stages. The regular season began in October 2002.

=== Regular season ===
The 24 teams played a round-robin tournament competition (home and away). Four teams from each group advanced to the knock-out stage (quarter-finals).

=== Top 16 ===
The winners from eighth-finals advanced to the quarterfinals. The matches were played at two games (home and away). The match winner was determined by point differential.

=== Quarterfinals ===
The winners from quarterfinals advanced to the semifinals. The matches were played at two games (home and away). The match winner was determined by point differential.

=== Semifinals ===
The winners from semifinals advanced to the finals. The matches were played at two games (home and away). The match winner was determined by point differential.

=== Final ===
The match was played as one game.

== Regular season ==
Key to colors
Top four places in each group advance to Top 16

=== Group A ===
	Team	Pld	W	L	PF	PA	Diff
1.	(Lithuania) Lietuvos rytas	10	7	3	822	758	64
2.	(France) Nancy	10	7	3	844	764	80
3.	(Serbia) Hemofarm	10	6	4	798	752	46
4.	(Spain) Gran Canaria Grupo Dunas	10	5	5	690	700	-10
5.	(Germany) Brose Baskets	10	3	7	693	772	-79
6.	(Greece) AEK	10	2	8	721	822	-101

=== Group B ===
	Team	Pld	W	L	PF	PA	Diff
1.	(Serbia) FMP	10	8	2	846	778	68
2.	(Latvia) Ventspils	10	7	3	827	779	48
3.	(France) Strasbourg	10	5	5	775	767	8
4.	(Italy) Snaidero Udine	10	5	5	801	792	9
5.	(Poland) Anwil Włocławek	10	3	7	753	813	-60
6.	(Turkey) Beşiktaş Cola Turka	10	2	8	726	799	-73

=== Group C ===
	Team	Pld	W	L	PF	PA	Diff
1.	(Italy) Montepaschi Siena	10	8	2	808	748	60
2.	(Russia) Khimki	10	5	5	866	835	31
3.	(Israel) Hapoel Jerusalem	10	5	5	821	796	25
4.	(Germany) Alba Berlin	10	4	6	759	770	-11
5.	(Bulgaria) Lukoil Academic	10	4	6	724	783	-59
6.	(Belgium) Telindus Oostende	10	4	6	741	787	-46

=== Group D ===
	Team	Pld	W	L	PF	PA	Diff
1.	(Spain) Real Madrid	10	7	3	827	710	117
2.	(Russia) UNICS	10	7	3	896	720	76
3.	(Serbia) Crvena zvezda	10	7	3	835	806	29
4.	(Greece) PAOK	10	6	4	725	778	-53
5.	(Netherlands) EiffelTowers EBBC	10	2	8	823	870	-47
6.	(Belgium) Dexia Mons-Hainaut	10	1	9	778	900	-122

== Top 16 ==
Team 1	Agg.	Team 2	1st leg	2nd leg
Gran Canaria Grupo Dunas (Spain)	148–158	(Serbia) FMP	84–88	64–70
Hapoel Jerusalem (Israel)	161–135	(Latvia) Ventspils	88–73	73–62
Strasbourg (France)	175–160	(France) Nancy	89–86	86–74
Snaidero Udine (Italy)	135–137	(Lithuania) Lietuvos rytas	75–72	60–65
Alba Berlin (Germany)	122–147	(Spain) Real Madrid	65–74	57–73
Crvena zvezda (Serbia)	182–153	(Russia) Khimki	89–77	93–76
Hemofarm (Serbia)	137–185	(Russia) UNICS	73–90	64–95
PAOK (Greece)	139–159	(Italy) Montepaschi Siena	62–79	77–80

== Quarterfinals ==
Team 1	Agg.	Team 2	1st leg	2nd leg
Hapoel Jerusalem (Israel)	158–167	(Serbia) FMP	88–79	70–88
Strasbourg (France)	139–142	(Lithuania) Lietuvos rytas	83–70	56–72
Crvena zvezda (Serbia)	150–162	(Spain) Real Madrid	72–83	78–79
UNICS (Russia)	180–149	(Italy) Montepaschi Siena	83–53	97–96

== Semifinals ==
Team 1	Agg.	Team 2	1st leg	2nd leg
Lietuvos rytas (Lithuania)	147–139	(Serbia) FMP	78–67	69–72
UNICS (Russia)	139–153	(Spain) Real Madrid	76–69	63–84

== Final ==
April 10, Spiroudome, Charleroi

Team 1	Score	Team 2
Real Madrid (Spain)	87–75	(Lithuania) Lietuvos rytas

2006–07 ULEB Cup Champions

Real Madrid
1st title

== Finals MVP ==
- (United States) Charles Smith (Real Madrid)

== Rosters (top 2) ==
1. (Spain) Real Madrid: Felipe Reyes, Charles Smith, Axel Hervelle, Louis Bullock, Álex Mumbrú, Raul Lopez, Blagota Sekulic, Kerem Tunçeri, Marko Tomas.

2. (Lithuania) Lietuvos Rytas: Matt Nielsen, Joao Paulo Batista, Ivan Koljevic, Marijonas Petravičius, Artūras Jomantas, Eurelijus Žukauskas, Tomas Delininkaitis, Andrius Šležas, Roberts Štelmahers, Jānis Blūms, Kareem Lamar Rush, Mindaugas Lukauskis.
