= Arnaldo Taurisano =

Italian basketball coach (1933–2019)

Arnaldo Taurisano (Milan, 18 November 1933 – Brescia, 7 May 2019) was an Italian professional basketball coach. In 2009, at the age of 76, he became member of the Italian Basketball Hall of Fame.

== Career ==
Taurisano began his coaching career before reaching the thirties with the local clubs of Lombardy as Pavoniana Milano and Nuova Pallacanestro Vigevano.

In 1963 he went north to the club of Pallacanestro Cantù, joining as an assistant coach and head of the infrastructure department. In the 1965–66 season he had his first opportunity to coach the men's section of Oransoda Cantù, and led the team to fifth place of Serie A with a 12–10 wins record. In 1969 Taurisano resumed the position as head coach of the team and entered the height of his career, continuing through the 1970s. Following the 1969–70 season, where the team ranked 6th and welcomed Pierluigi Marzorati, Forst Cantù emerged as the third power of Italian League for four consecutive years, behind rival teams Ignis Varese and Simmenthal Milano. Arnaldo Taurisano and his team won the Italian championship in the 1974–75 season, the first and only in his career. At the same time, Taurisano led Forst Cantù to three consecutive wins of the newly founded FIBA Korać Cup in three finals against Maes Pils (1973), Partizan (1973–74) and Ranko Žeravica's FC Barcelona (1974–75). In September of 1975, Arnaldo Taurisano participated as Italian champion with Forst in the FIBA Intercontinental Cup, held in the cities of Cantù and Varese. In a five game round with a record 4–1 wins the team became world champions. During the year, the team took part in the FIBA European Champions Cup, where they reached the semifinals and were finally eliminated by Mobilgirgi Varese. Achieving second place in the regular season of Serie A sent Forst to the FIBA European Cup Winners' Cup of the following year. This gave an opportunity for Taurisano to earn additional European titles, leading Gabetti Cantù to three consecutive finals victories, all while remaining competitive in the domestic leagues. In 1979 Taurisano retired from coaching completely.

His career continued oddly in basketball clubs moving between Serie A and Serie A2 until 1990.

== Clubs ==
- 1962–63 Vigevano
- 1963–65 Cantù (Assistant/Juniors)
- 1965–66 Cantù
- 1966–69 Cantù (Assistant/Juniors)
- 1969–79 Cantù
- 1979–80 Rimini
- 1980–82 Lazio Roma
- 1982–84 Partenope Napoli
- 1984–86 Brescia
- 1986–88 Partenope Napoli
- 1988–90 Pavia

== Career achievements and awards ==
=== Club competitions ===
- FIBA Intercontinental Cup: 1 (with Cantù: 1975)
- FIBA Cup Winners' Cup: 3 (with Cantù: 1976–77, 1977–78, 1978–79)
- FIBA Korać Cup: 3 (with Cantù: 1973, 1973–74, 1974–75)

also

- FIBA European Champions Cup semifinalist – (with Cantù: 1975–76)
- Italian League: 1 (with Cantù: 1974–75)

=== Personal awards ===
Member of the Italian Basketball Hall of Fame (2009)
