= Fabrizio Della Fiori =

Italian basketball player (born 1951)

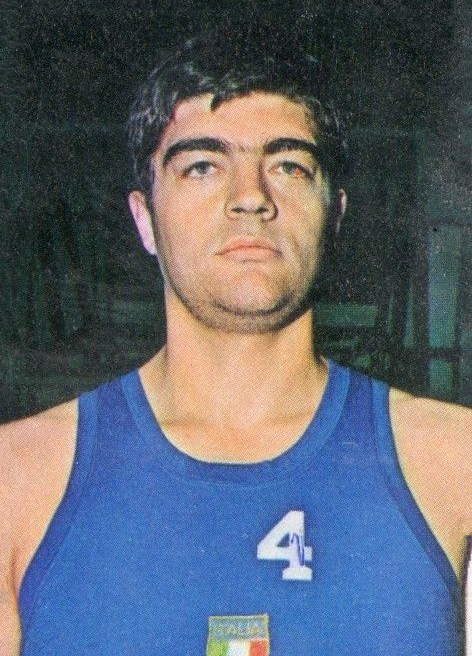
- Della Fiori, in 1975.

Personal information
- Born: 1 September 1951 (age 75) Formigara, Italy
- Listed height: 6 ft 8.5 in (2.04 m)
- Listed weight: 225 lb (102 kg)

Career information
- Playing career: 1967–1986
- Position: Power forward

Career history
- 1967–1979: Cantù
- 1979–1981: Reyer Venezia
- 1981–1984: Varese
- 1984–1985: A.P.U. Udine
- 1985–1986: Robur Varese

Career highlights
- FIBA Intercontinental Cup champion (1975); 2× FIBA European Selection (1977, 1980); 3× FIBA European Cup Winners Cup champion (1977, 1978, 1979); 3× FIBA Korać Cup champion (1973, 1974, 1975); 2× Italian League champion (1968, 1975); Italian Basketball Hall of Fame (2014)
Medals
Men's basketball
Representing Italy
Summer Olympic Games
| Silver medal – second place | 1980 Moscow |
FIBA EuroBasket
| Bronze medal – third place | 1975 Yugoslavia |
European U-18 Championship
| Bronze medal – third place | 1970 Greece | Under-18 |

Fabrizio Della Fiori (born 1 September 1951) is a retired professional basketball player from Italy. He was inducted into the Italian Basketball Hall of Fame in 2014.

== Professional career ==
As a player of Cantù, Della Fiori won the 1975 edition of the FIBA Intercontinental Cup. He was also a member of the FIBA European Selection Team, in 1977 and 1980.

== National team career ==
Della Fiori won the silver medal with the senior Italian national basketball team, at the 1980 Summer Olympics, in Moscow. His team lost in the final, against Yugoslavia. Prior to that, he won a bronze medal at the 1975 FIBA EuroBasket, and finished in fourth place at the 1977 FIBA EuroBasket.
