= KK Kvarner in international competitions =

KK Kvarner history and statistics in FIBA Europe and Euroleague Basketball (company) competitions.

== European competitions ==
| Record | Round | Opponent club | | |
|---|---|---|---|---|
1977–78 FIBA European Cup Winners' Cup 2nd–tier
| 2–6 | 2nd round | (Hungary) Soproni MAFC | 93–94 a | 88–78 h |
| 2–6 | QF | (Netherlands) Falcon Jeans EBBC | 85–99 a | 65–78 h |
| 2–6 | QF | (France) Caen | 100–93 h | 79–92 a |
| 2–6 | QF | (Italy) Gabetti Cantù | 74–81 h | 67–92 a |
1994–95 FIBA Korać Cup 3rd–tier
| 1–2 +1 draw | 1st round | Bye | Croatia Line Rijeka qualified without games | |
| 1–2 +1 draw | 2nd round | (Lithuania) Statyba | 84–69 (h) | 73–80 (a) |
| 1–2 +1 draw | 3rd round | (Italy) Birex Verona | 73–73 (h) | 75–77 (a) |
2000–01 FIBA Korać Cup 3rd–tier
| 3–1 | 1st round | (Bosnia and Herzegovina) Brotnjo | 84–79 (h) | 88–71 (a) |
| 3–1 | 2nd round | (Turkey) Türk Telekom | 101–92 (h) | 62–89 (a) |
2001–02 FIBA Korać Cup 3rd–tier
| 0–2 | 1st round | (Hungary) Kaposvári | 73–90 (a) | 65–80 (h) |

== Record ==
KK Kvarner has overall, from 1977–78 (first participation) to 2001–02 (last participation): 6 wins against 11 defeats and 1 draw in 18 games for all the European club competitions.

- EuroLeague: –
  - FIBA Saporta Cup: 2–6 in 8 games
    - FIBA Korać Cup: 4–5 plus 1 draw in 10 games
