= FIBA Korać Cup =

Defunct basketball cup competition

- The FIBA Korać Cup trophy
- Organising body: FIBA Europe
- Founded: 1971; 55 years ago
- First season: 1972
- Folded: 2002; 24 years ago
- Region: Europe
- Level on pyramid: 3
- Last champions: (France) SLUC Nancy (1st title) (2001–02)
- Most championships: (Italy) Cantù (4 titles)

The FIBA Korać Cup was an annual basketball club competition held by FIBA Europe between the 1971–72 and 2001–02 seasons. It was the third-tier level club competition in European basketball, after the FIBA European Champions Cup (later renamed the EuroLeague) and the FIBA Cup Winners Cup (later renamed the FIBA Saporta Cup). The last Korać Cup season was held during the 2001–02 season.

== History ==
The Korać Cup was named after the legendary Yugoslav player Radivoj Korać, killed in 1969 in a car accident near Sarajevo. The Korać Cup is not to be confused with the Serbian national basketball cup competition, the Radivoj Korać Cup, which has been named after Radivoj Korać since the mid-2000s, the next year after the international Korać Cup competition was terminated. Following the 2011 agreement between FIBA Europe and the Basketball Federation of Serbia, the actual winners' trophy given out for 30 years in the Korać Cup (the so-called "Žućko's left") will, from 2012 onwards, be given to the winning team of the Serbian national cup competition.

On 6 October 1985, Zdenko Babic of KK Zadar scored 144 pts against Apollon Limassol, a record for a club continental competition.

== Finals ==
Year	Final			Semifinalists	
Year	Champion	Score	Second place		
1972; Details	(Socialist Federal Republic of Yugoslavia); Lokomotiva	165–156 (71–83 / 94–73)	(Socialist Federal Republic of Yugoslavia); OKK Beograd	(Belgium); Standard Liège	(France); Olympique Antibes
1973; Details	(Italy); Birra Forst Cantù	191–169 (106–75 / 85–94)	(Belgium); Maes Pils	(Spain); Filomatic Picadero	(Spain); CF Barcelona
1973–74; Details	(Italy); Birra Forst Cantù	174–154 (99–86 / 68–75)	(Socialist Federal Republic of Yugoslavia); Partizan	(France); ASVEL	(Socialist Federal Republic of Yugoslavia); Jugoplastika
1974–75; Details	(Italy); Birra Forst Cantù	181–154 (69–71 / 110–85)	(Spain); CF Barcelona	(Socialist Federal Republic of Yugoslavia); Partizan	(Italy); Brina Rieti
1975–76; Details	(Socialist Federal Republic of Yugoslavia); Jugoplastika	179–166 (97–84 / 82–82)	(Italy); Chinamartini Torino	(Italy); Sinudyne Bologna	(Spain); Juventud Schweppes
1976–77; Details	(Socialist Federal Republic of Yugoslavia); Jugoplastika	87–84	(Italy); Alco Bologna	(Italy); IBP Stella Azzurra	(France); Berck
1977–78; Details	(Socialist Federal Republic of Yugoslavia); Partizan	117–110	(Socialist Federal Republic of Yugoslavia); Bosna	(Spain); Juventud Freixenet	(Italy); Cinzano Milano
1978–79; Details	(Socialist Federal Republic of Yugoslavia); Partizan	108–98	(Italy); Arrigoni Rieti	(Socialist Federal Republic of Yugoslavia); Jugoplastika	(Spain); Cotonificio
1979–80; Details	(Italy); Arrigoni Rieti	76–71	(Socialist Federal Republic of Yugoslavia); Cibona	(Socialist Federal Republic of Yugoslavia); Jugoplastika	(Israel); Hapoel Tel Aviv
1980–81; Details	(Spain); Joventut Freixenet	105–104	(Italy); Carrera Venezia	(Socialist Federal Republic of Yugoslavia); Crvena zvezda	(Soviet Union); Dynamo Moscow
1981–82; Details	(France); Limoges CSP	90–84	(Socialist Federal Republic of Yugoslavia); Šibenka	(Socialist Federal Republic of Yugoslavia); Zadar	(Socialist Federal Republic of Yugoslavia); Crvena zvezda
1982–83; Details	(France); Limoges CSP	94–86	(Socialist Federal Republic of Yugoslavia); Šibenka	(Soviet Union); Dynamo Moscow	(Socialist Federal Republic of Yugoslavia); Zadar
1983–84; Details	(France); Orthez	97–73	(Socialist Federal Republic of Yugoslavia); Crvena zvezda	(France); Olympique Antibes	(Spain); CAI Zaragoza
1984–85; Details	(Italy); Simac Milano	91–78	(Italy); Ciaocrem Varese	(Socialist Federal Republic of Yugoslavia); Crvena zvezda	(Greece); Aris
1985–86; Details	(Italy); Banco di Roma	157–150 (78–84 / 73–72)	(Italy); Mobilgirgi Caserta	(France); Olympique Antibes	(Italy); Divarese Varese
1986–87; Details	(Spain); FC Barcelona	203–171 (106–85 / 86–97)	(France); Limoges CSP	(Italy); Mobilgirgi Caserta	(Spain); CAI Zaragoza
1987–88; Details	(Spain); Real Madrid	195–183 (102–89 / 94–93)	(Socialist Federal Republic of Yugoslavia); Cibona	(Socialist Federal Republic of Yugoslavia); Crvena zvezda	(Israel); Hapoel Tel Aviv
1988–89; Details	(Socialist Federal Republic of Yugoslavia); Partizan	177–171 (89–76 / 101–82)	(Italy); Wiwa Vismara Cantù	(Socialist Federal Republic of Yugoslavia); Zadar	(Italy); Philips Milano
1989–90; Details	(Spain); Ram Joventut	195–184 (98–99 / 96–86)	(Italy); Scavolini Pesaro	(Socialist Federal Republic of Yugoslavia); Bosna	(Soviet Union); CSKA Moscow
1990–91; Details	(Italy); Shampoo Clear Cantù	168–164 (71–73 / 95–93)	(Spain); Real Madrid Otaysa	(France); FC Mulhouse	(Spain); Montigalà Joventut
1991–92; Details	(Italy); Il Messaggero Roma	193–180 (94–94 / 86–99)	(Italy); Scavolini Pesaro	(Spain); Fórum Filatélico Valladolid	(Italy); Shampoo Clear Cantù
1992–93; Details	(Italy); Philips Milano	201–181 (90–95 / 106–91)	(Italy); Virtus Roma	(Italy); Shampoo Clear Cantù	(Spain); FC Barcelona Banca Catalana
1993–94; Details	(Greece); PAOK Bravo	175–157 (75–66 / 91–100)	(Italy); Stefanel Trieste	(Greece); Chipita Panionios	(Italy); Recoaro Milano
1994–95; Details	(Germany); Alba Berlin	172–166 (87–87 / 85–79)	(Italy); Stefanel Milano	(Spain); Cáceres	(France); Pau-Orthez
1995–96; Details	(Turkey); Efes Pilsen	146–145 (76–68 / 77–70)	(Italy); Stefanel Milano	(Italy); Teamsystem Bologna	(France); ASVEL
1996–97; Details	(Greece); Aris	154–147 (66–77 / 70–88)	(Turkey); Tofaş	(Italy); Benetton Treviso	(Poland); Mazowszanka
1997–98; Details	(Italy); Mash Jeans Verona	141–138 (68–74 / 64–73)	(Federal Republic of Yugoslavia); Crvena zvezda	(Italy); Calze Pompea Roma	(France); Cholet
1998–99; Details	(Spain); FC Barcelona	174–163 (93–77 / 97–70)	(Spain); Adecco Estudiantes	(Greece); Panionios Nutella	(Belgium); Sunair Oostende
1999–00; Details	(France); Limoges CSP	131–118 (80–58 / 60–51)	(Spain); Unicaja	(Spain); Casademont Girona	(Spain); Adecco Estudiantes
2000–01; Details	(Spain); Unicaja	148–116 (77–47 / 69–71)	(Federal Republic of Yugoslavia); Hemofarm	(Netherlands); Ricoh Astronauts	(Belgium); Athlon Ieper
2001–02; Details	(France); SLUC Nancy	172–167 (98–72 / 95–74)	(Russia); Lokomotiv Mineralnye Vody	(Slovenia); Pivovarna Laško	(Greece); Maroussi Telestet

== Titles by club ==
Rank	Club	Titles	Runner-up	Champion Years
1.	(Italy) Cantù	4	1	1973, 1973–74, 1974–75, 1990–91
2.	(Socialist Federal Republic of Yugoslavia) Partizan	3	1	1977–78, 1978–79, 1988–89
–	(France) Limoges CSP	3	1	1981–82, 1982–83, 1999–00
4.	(Italy) Olimpia Milano	2	2	1984–85, 1992–93
5.	(Italy) Virtus Roma	2	1	1985–86, 1991–92
–	(Spain) FC Barcelona	2	1	1986–87, 1998–99
7.	(Socialist Federal Republic of Yugoslavia) Split	2		1975–76, 1976–77
–	(Spain) Joventut Badalona	2		1980–81, 1989–90
9.	(Socialist Federal Republic of Yugoslavia) Cibona	1	2	1972
10.	(Italy) AMG Sebastiani	1	1	1979–80
–	(Spain) Real Madrid	1	1	1987–88
–	(Spain) Málaga	1	1	2000–01
13.	(France) Pau-Lacq-Orthez	1		1983–84
–	(Greece) PAOK	1		1993–94
–	(Germany) Alba Berlin	1		1994–95
–	(Turkey) Efes Pilsen	1		1995–96
–	(Greece) Aris	1		1996–97
–	(Italy) Scaligera Verona	1		1997–98
–	(France) SLUC Nancy	1		2001–02
20.	(Socialist Federal Republic of Yugoslavia) Šibenka		2
–	(Federal Republic of Yugoslavia) Crvena zvezda		2
–	(Italy) Victoria Libertas		2
23.	(Socialist Federal Republic of Yugoslavia) OKK Beograd		1
–	(Belgium) Racing Mechelen		1
–	(Italy) Auxilium Torino		1
–	(Italy) Fortitudo Bologna		1
–	(Socialist Federal Republic of Yugoslavia) Bosna		1
–	(Italy) Reyer Venezia		1
–	(Italy) Varese		1
–	(Italy) JuveCaserta		1
–	(Italy) Trieste		1
–	(Turkey) Tofaş		1
–	(Spain) Estudiantes		1
–	(Federal Republic of Yugoslavia) Vršac		1
–	(Russia) Lokomotiv Rostov		1

== Titles by nation ==
Rank	Country	Titles	Runners-up
1.	Italy	10	13
2.	(Socialist Federal Republic of Yugoslavia) (Federal Republic of Yugoslavia) Yugoslavia	6	10
3.	Spain	6	4
4.	France	5	1
5.	Greece	2
6.	Turkey	1	1
7.	(Germany)	1
8.	Belgium		1
9.	Russia		1

== Winning rosters ==
- 1972 (Socialist Federal Republic of Yugoslavia) Lokomotiva

Nikola Plećaš, Damir Rukavina, Vječeslav Kavedžija, Rajko Gospodnetić, Milivoj Omašić, Eduard Bočkaj, Ivica Valek, Dragan Kovačić, Petar Jelić, Ante Ercegović, Zdenko Grgić, Srećko Šute, Zvonko Avberšek (Head coach: Marijan Catinelli)

- 1973 (Italy) Birra Forst Cantù

Pierlo Marzorati, Bob Lienhard, Carlo Recalcati, Antonio Farina, Mario Beretta, Fabrizio Della Fiori, Luciano Vendemini, Franco Meneghel, Renzo Tombolato, Giorgio Cattini, Danilo Zonta (Head coach: Arnaldo Taurisano)

- 1973–74 (Italy) Birra Forst Cantù

Pierlo Marzorati, Bob Lienhard, Carlo Recalcati, Fabrizio Della Fiori, Antonio Farina, Franco Meneghel, Mario Beretta, Renzo Tombolato, Giorgio Cattini, Luciano Vendemini, Danilo Zonta (Head coach: Arnaldo Taurisano)

- 1974–75 (Italy) Birra Forst Cantù

Bob Lienhard, Pierlo Marzorati, Fabrizio Della Fiori, Carlo Recalcati, Antonio Farina, Franco Meneghel, Mario Beretta, Renzo Tombolato, Giorgio Cattini, Silvano Cancian (Head coach: Arnaldo Taurisano)

- 1975–76 (Socialist Federal Republic of Yugoslavia) Jugoplastika

Željko Jerkov, Rato Tvrdić, Duje Krstulović, Mirko Grgin, Mlađan Tudor, Branko Macura, Ivo Bilanović, Ivica Skaric, Damir Šolman, Branislav Stamenković, Ivica Dukan, Mihajlo Manović, Drago Peterka, Slobodan Bjelajac (Head coach: Petar Skansi)

- 1976–77 (Socialist Federal Republic of Yugoslavia) Jugoplastika

Željko Jerkov, Rato Tvrdić, Damir Šolman, Duje Krstulović, Mlađan Tudor, Mirko Grgin, Mihajlo Manović, Ivo Bilanović, Branko Macura, Ivica Dukan, Slobodan Bjelajac, Predrag Kruščić (Head coach: Petar Skansi)

- 1977–78 (Socialist Federal Republic of Yugoslavia) Partizan

Dragan Kićanović, Dražen Dalipagić, Miodrag Marić, Jadran Vujačić, Boban Petrović, Dragan Todorić, Dušan Kerkez, Boris Beravs, Milenko Babić, Milan Medić, Arsenije Pešić, Zoran Krečković, Dragan Đukić (Head coach: Ranko Žeravica)

- 1978–79 (Socialist Federal Republic of Yugoslavia) Partizan

Dragan Kićanović, Miodrag Marić, Boban Petrović, Arsenije Pešić, Dragan Todorić, Jadran Vujačić, Dušan Kerkez, Boris Beravs, Goran Knežević, Milenko Savović, Milenko Babić, Milan Medić, Predrag Bojić, Miroslav Milojević (Head coach: Dušan Ivković)

- 1979–80 (Italy) Arrigoni Rieti

Roberto Brunamonti, Lee Johnson, Willie Sojourner, Giuseppe Danzi, Alberto Scodavolpe, Gianfranco Sanesi, Antonio Olivieri, Luca Blasetti, Mauro Antonelli, Stefano Colantoni, Paolo di Fazi, Antonio Coppola (Head coach: Elio Pentassuglia)

- 1980–81 (Spain) Joventut Freixenet

Al Skinner, Luis Miguel Santillana, Josep Maria Margall, Gonzalo Sagi-Vela, Joe Galvin, Ernesto Delgado, German Gonzalez, Jordi Villacampa, Francisco Sole, Roberto Mora, Antonio Pruna (Head coach: Manel Comas)

- 1981–82 (France) Limoges CSP

Ed Murphy, Richard Dacoury, Jean-Michel Sénégal, Irv Kiffin, Apollo Faye, Jean-Luc Deganis, Yves-Marie Verove, Didier Rose, Richard Billet, Philippe Koundrioukoff, Eric Narbonne, Benoit Tremouille (Head coach: André Buffière)

- 1982–83 (France) Limoges CSP

Ed Murphy, Richard Dacoury, Jean-Michel Sénégal, Glenn Mosley, Apollo Faye, Jean-Luc Deganis, Hugues Occansey, Didier Dobbels, Didier Rose, Eric Narbonne, Mathieu Faye, Olivier Garry (Head coach: André Buffière)

- 1983–84 (France) Orthez

Paul Henderson, John McCullough, Bengaly Kaba, Mathieu Bisseni, Freddy Hufnagel, Christian Ortega, Philippe Laperche, Pascal Laperche, Didier Gadou, Alain Gadou (Head coach: George Fisher)

- 1984–85 (Italy) Simac Milano

Mike D'Antoni, Dino Meneghin, Russ Schoene, Roberto Premier, Joe Barry Carroll, Renzo Bariviera, Franco Boselli, Mario Pettorossi, Vittorio Gallinari, Tullio De Piccoli, Marco Lamperti, Mario Governa, Marco Baldi (Head coach: Dan Peterson)

- 1985–86 (Italy) Banco di Roma

Leo Rautins, Bruce Flowers, Enrico Gilardi, Marco Solfrini, Stefano Sbarra, Fulvio Polesello, Franco Rossi, Phil Melillo, Fabrizio Valente, Claudio Brunetti, Gianluca Duri, Franco Picozzi (Head coach: Mario de Sisti)

- 1986–87 (Spain) FC Barcelona

Juan Antonio San Epifanio, Chicho Sibilio, Wallace Bryant, Ignacio Solozabal, Andrés Jiménez, Steve Trumbo, Juan Domingo De la Cruz, Quim Costa, Jordi Soler, Julian Ortiz, Ferran Martínez, Kenny Simpson (Head coach: Aíto García Reneses)

- 1987–88 (Spain) Real Madrid

Wendell Alexis, Fernando Martín, Brad Branson, Fernando Romay, Juan Antonio Corbalán, José Biriukov, José Luis Llorente, Juan Manuel López Iturriaga, Pep Cargol, Antonio Martín, Alfonso Del Corral (Head coach: Lolo Sainz)

- 1988–89 (Socialist Federal Republic of Yugoslavia) Partizan

Vlade Divac, Aleksandar Đorđević, Predrag Danilović, Žarko Paspalj, Ivo Nakić, Željko Obradović, Oliver Popović, Milenko Savović, Jadran Vujačić, Miladin Mutavdžić, Boris Orcev, Predrag Prlinčević, Dejan Lakićević, Vladimir Bosanac (Head coach: Dušan Vujošević)

- 1989–90 (Spain) Ram Joventut

Jordi Villacampa, Lemone Lampley, Reggie Johnson, Juan Antonio Morales, Jose Antonio Montero, Rafael Jofresa, Tomás Jofresa, Carlos Ruf, Josep Maria Margall, Dani Pérez, Antonio Medianero, Pere Remon, Ferran Lopez, Robert Bellavista (Head coach: Herb Brown / Pedro Martínez)

- 1990–91 (Italy) Shampoo Clear Cantù

Pace Mannion, Pierlo Marzorati, Davide Pessina, Giuseppe Bosa, Roosevelt Bouie, Alberto Rossini, Angelo Gilardi, Andrea Gianolla, Silvano Dal Seno, Omar Tagliabue, Alessandro Zorzolo, Fabio Gatti (Head coach: Fabrizio Frates)

- 1991–92 (Italy) Il Messaggero Roma

Dino Rađa, Rick Mahorn, Roberto Premier, Andrea Niccolai, Alessandro Fantozzi, Donato Avenia, Stefano Attruia, Fausto Bargna, Davide Croce, Gianluca Lulli (Head coach: Paolo di Fonzo)

- 1992–93 (Italy) Philips Milano

Aleksandar Đorđević, Antonello Riva, Antonio Davis, Riccardo Pittis, Flavio Portaluppi, Davide Pessina, Fabrizio Ambrassa, Paolo Alberti, Marco Baldi, Marco Sambugaro, Massimo Re (Head coach: Mike D'Antoni)

- 1993–94 (Greece) PAOK Bravo

Walter Berry, Zoran Savić, Branislav Prelević, John Korfas, Nasos Galakteros, Nikos Boudouris, Achilleas Mamatziolas, George Ballogiannis, Christos Tsekos, Efthimis Rentzias, Georgios Valavanidis, Fotis Takianos (Head coach: Soulis Markopoulos)

- 1994–95 (Germany) Alba Berlin

Teoman Alibegović, Saša Obradović, Gunther Behnke, Henrik Rödl, Ingo Freyer, Ademola Okulaja, Stephan Baeck, Teoman Öztürk, Sebastian Machowski, Patrick Falk, Oliver Braun (Head coach: Svetislav Pešić)

- 1995–96 (Turkey) Efes Pilsen

Petar Naumoski, Conrad McRae, Ufuk Sarıca, Mirsad Türkcan, Volkan Aydın, Tamer Oyguç, Murat Evliyaoğlu, Hüseyin Beşok, Bora Sancar, Mustafa Kemal Bitim, Alpay Öztaş, Erdal Bibo (Head coach: Aydın Örs)

- 1996–97 (Greece) Aris

José "Piculín" Ortiz, Charles Shackleford, Mario Boni, Panagiotis Liadelis, Dinos Angelidis, Mike Nahar, Alan Tomidy, Tzanis Stavrakopoulos, Giannis Sioutis, Georgios Floros, Srđan Jovanović, Alexis Papadatos, Aris Holopoulos (Head coach: Slobodan-Lefteris Subotić)

- 1997–98 (Italy) Mash Jeans Verona

Mike Iuzzolino, Hansi Gnad, Randolph Keys, Myron Brown, Roberto Dalla Vecchia, Roberto Bullara, Joachim Jerichow, Alessandro Boni, Matteo Nobile, Giampiero Savio, Damiano Dalfini, Davide Tisato, Matteo Sacchetti, Mario Soave, Massimo Spezie (Head coach: Andrea Mazzon)

- 1998–99 (Spain) FC Barcelona

Aleksandar Đorđević, Derrick Alston, Milan Gurović, Efthimis Rentzias, Roger Esteller, Rodrigo De la Fuente, Roberto Dueñas, Xavi Fernandez, Ignacio Rodríguez, Alfons Alzamora, Oriol Junyent, Juan Carlos Navarro, Chema Marcos (Head coach: Aíto García Reneses)

- 1999–00 (France) Limoges CSP

Marcus Brown, Yann Bonato, Harper Williams, Frédéric Weis, Bruno Hamm, Thierry Rupert, Stéphane Dumas, David Frigout, Stjepan Stazic, Jean-Philippe Methelie, Carl Thomas, Frédéric Adjiwanou (Head coach: Duško Ivanović)

- 2000–01 (Spain) Unicaja

Danya Abrams, Veljko Mršić, Moustapha Sonko, Richard Petruška, Jean-Marc Jaumin, Paco Vazquez, Berni Rodríguez, Frédéric Weis, Darren Phillip, Carlos Cabezas, Kenny Miller, Germán Gabriel, Francis Perujo (Head coach: Božidar Maljković)

- 2001–02 (France) SLUC Nancy

Stevin Smith, Cyril Julian, Ross Land, Fabien Dubos, Goran Bošković, Joseph Gomis, Vincent Masingue, Maxime Zianveni, Mouhamadou Mbodji, Danilo Cmiljanić, Gary Phaeton, Loic Toilier (Head coach: Sylvain Lautie)

== Statistical leaders per season ==
=== Top scorers ===
Since the beginning of the 1986–87 season (Total Points Per Season):

- 1986–87 (United States) Paul Thompson (Limoges): 245
- 1987–88 (Socialist Federal Republic of Yugoslavia) Drazen Petrovic (Cibona Zagreb): 302
- 1988–89 (United States) Jeff Turner (Wiwa Vismara Cantù): 273
- 1989–90 (United States) Reggie Johnson (Jovedud Badalona): 265
- 1990–91 (United States) Pace Mannion (Clear Cantù): 334

Since the beginning of the 1991–92 season (Points Per Game):

- 1991–92 (United States) Joe Arlauckas (Taugres Vitoria): 29.7
- 1992–93 (United States) Joe Arlauckas (Taugres Vitoria): 32
- 1993–94 (United States) Henry Turner (Panionios Smyrna): 27.5
- 1994–95 (United States) Steve Burtt (Illycaffé Trieste): 32.9
- 1995–96 (United States) Mitchell Wiggins (Sporting Athens): 27.1
- 1996–97 (United States) Orlando Lightfoot (Echo Houthalen): 28.6
- 1997–98 (United States) (Italy) Mike Iuzzolino (Mash Verona): 22.8
- 1998–99 (Sweden) David Bergstrom (Norrkoping Dolphins): 25.7
- 1999–00 (United States) Brian Evans (Lineltex Imola): 23.1
- 2000–01 (United States) Acie Earl (Turk Telecom): 24.9
- 2001–02 (Croatia) Velimir Perasović (Fuenlabrada): 23.8

=== Most rebounds ===
Since the beginning of the 1991–92 season (Rebounds Per Game):

- 1991–92 (Lithuania) Arvydas Sabonis (Forum Valladolid): 15.6
- 1992–93 (United States) P.J. Brown (Panionios Smyrna): 14.3
- 1993–94 (United States) Ed Stokes (Panionios Smyrna): 12.8
- 1994–95 (United States) Kevin Thompson (Illycaffe Trieste): 16
- 1995–96 (United States) Dallas Comegys (Fenerbahce Istanbul): 12.1
- 1996–97 (United States) Steve Payne (JDA Dijon): 11.7
- 1997–98 (United States) Michael Ansley (Darussafaka Istanbul): 9.2
- 1998–99 (Czech Republic) Richard Petruska (Galatasaray Istanbul): 9.7
- 1999–00 (The Bahamas) Mark Dean (Maccabi Haifa): 14.7
- 2000–01 (United States) Tanoka Beard (Fenerbahce): 13.8
- 2001–02 (United States) Kebu Stewart (Hapoel Jerusalem): 11.7

=== Most assists ===
Since the beginning of the 1991–92 season (Assists Per Game):

- 1991–92 (Spain) Pablo Laso (Taugres Vitoria): 9
- 1992–93 (Spain) Pablo Laso (Taugres Vitoria): 8.7
- 1993–94 (Germany) Henrik Rodl (Alba Berlin): 5.3
- 1994–95 (Russia) Evgeni Pashutin (Dynamo Moscow): 9.3
- 1995–96 (United States) (France) Delaney Rudd (ASVEL Villeurbanne): 6.5
- 1996–97 (Russia) Oleg Ten (CSK VVS Samara): 7.5
- 1997–98 (Italy) Gianmarco Pozzecco (Varese): 5.4
- 1998–99 (Belgium) Jean-Marc Jaumin (Sunair Oostende): 6.7
- 1999–00 (Finland) Teemu Rannikko (Piiloset Turku): 5.5
- 2000–01 (Bulgaria) Georgi Mladenov (Levski Sofia): 7.4
- 2001–02 (Czech Republic) Petr Czudek (BK Opava): 7.9

=== Index rating ===
- 1991–92 (Lithuania) Arvydas Sabonis (Forum Valladolid): 34.7
- 1992–93 (United States) Joe Arlauckas (Taugres Vitoria): 36
- 1993–94 (United States) Henry Turner (Panionios Smyrna): 27.2
- 1994–95 (United States) Kevin Thompson (Illycaffe Trieste): 29.8
- 1995–96 (United States) Dallas Comegys (Fenerbahce Istanbul): 23.7
- 1996–97 (United States) Orlando Lightfoot (Echo Houthalen): 30.1
- 1997–98 (United States) Michael Ansley (Darussafaka Istanbul): 24.4
- 1988–89 (United States) Jared Lee Miller (FC Porto): 23.3
- 1999–00 (United States) Thalamus McGhee (Apollon Limassol): 26.9
- 2000–01 (United States) Tanoka Beard (Fenerbahce): 30.7
- 2001–02 (Russia) Victor Khryapa (Avtodor Saratov): 24.9

== Korać Cup Finals Top Scorers ==
From the 1972 to 2001–02 seasons, the Top Scorer of the Korać Cup finals was noted, regardless of whether he played on the winning or losing team.

*	Member of the Naismith Memorial Basketball Hall of Fame
**	Member of the FIBA Hall of Fame
***	Member of both the Naismith and FIBA Halls of Fame

Season	Top Scorer	Club	Points Scored
1972	(Socialist Federal Republic of Yugoslavia) Nikola Plećaš	(Socialist Federal Republic of Yugoslavia) Lokomotiva	34.5 (2 games)
1973	(United States) Bob Lienhard	(Italy) Birra Forst Cantù	27.0 (2 games)
1973–74	(Socialist Federal Republic of Yugoslavia) Dražen Dalipagić***	(Socialist Federal Republic of Yugoslavia) Partizan	23.5 (2 games)
1974–75	(Spain) Jesús Iradier	(Spain) FC Barcelona	22.0 (2 games)
1975–76	(United States) John Laing	(Italy) Chinamartini Torino	33.0 (2 games)
1976–77	(Socialist Federal Republic of Yugoslavia) Željko Jerkov	(Socialist Federal Republic of Yugoslavia) Jugoplastika	34
1977–78	(Socialist Federal Republic of Yugoslavia) Dražen Dalipagić*** (2)	(Socialist Federal Republic of Yugoslavia) Partizan	48
1978–79	(Socialist Federal Republic of Yugoslavia) Dragan Kićanović**	(Socialist Federal Republic of Yugoslavia) Partizan	41
1979–80	(United States) Lee Johnson	(Italy) Arrigoni Rieti	28
1980–81	(United States) Spencer Haywood	(Italy) Carrera Venezia	30
1981–82	(United States) Ed Murphy	(France) Limoges CSP	35
1982–83	(United States) Ed Murphy (2)	(France) Limoges CSP	34
1983–84	(United States) John McCullough	(France) Orthez	29
1984–85	(United States) Russ Schoene	(Italy) Simac Milano	33
1985–86	(Canada) Leo Rautins	(Italy) Banco di Roma	21
1986–87	(United States) Wallace Bryant	(Spain) FC Barcelona	16.5 (2 games)
1987–88	(Socialist Federal Republic of Yugoslavia) Dražen Petrović***	(Socialist Federal Republic of Yugoslavia) Cibona	34.0 (2 games)
1988–89	(Socialist Federal Republic of Yugoslavia) Vlade Divac	(Socialist Federal Republic of Yugoslavia) Partizan	29.0 (2 games)
1989–90	(United States) Darwin Cook & (United States) Darren Daye	(Italy) Scavolini Pesaro	26.5 (2 games)
1990–91	(United States) Pace Mannion	(Italy) Shampoo Clear Cantù	34.0 (2 games)
1991–92	(United States) Darren Daye (2)	(Italy) Scavolini Pesaro	28.5 (2 games)
1992–93	(Federal Republic of Yugoslavia) Sasha Djordjević	(Italy) Philips Milano	33.5 (2 games)
1993–94	(United States) Walter Berry	(Greece) PAOK Bravo	24.5 (2 games)
1994–95	(Slovenia) Teoman Alibegović	(Germany) Alba Berlin	27.5 (2 games)
1995–96	(North Macedonia) Petar Naumoski	(Turkey) Efes Pilsen	28.5 (2 games)
1996–97	(Puerto Rico) José "Piculín" Ortiz	(Greece) Aris	22.0 (2 games)
1997–98	(United States) (Italy) Mike Iuzzolino	(Italy) Mash Jeans Verona	22.5 (2 games)
1998–99	(Federal Republic of Yugoslavia) Sasha Djordjević (2)	(Spain) FC Barcelona	19.0 (2 games)
1990–00	(United States) Marcus Brown	(France) Limoges CSP	24.0 (2 games)
2000–01	(United States) Danya Abrams	(Spain) Unicaja	16.5 (2 games)
2001–02	(United States) James "Hollywood" Robinson	(Russia) Lokomotiv Rostov	18.5 (2 games)

== Top scoring performances in final games ==
1. Dražen Dalipagić (Partizan) 48 points vs. Bosna (in 1977–78 final)
2. Dražen Petrović (Cibona) 47 points vs. Real Madrid (in second leg of 1987–88 final)
3. Dragan Kićanović (Partizan) 41 points vs. Arrigoni Rieti (in 1978–79 final)
4. Nikola Plećaš (Lokomotiva) 40 points vs. OKK Beograd (in second leg of 1971–72 final)
5. Sasha Djordjević (Philips Milano) 38 points vs. Virtus Roma (in second leg of 1992–93 final)
6. Antonello Riva (Wiwa Vismara Cantù) 36 points vs. Partizan (in second leg of 1988–89 final)
7. Pace Mannion (Shampoo Clear Cantù) 35 points vs. Real Madrid (in second leg of 1990–91 final)
8. Ed Murphy (Limoges CSP) 35 points vs. Šibenka (in 1981–82 final)
9. Ed Murphy (Limoges CSP) 34 points vs. Šibenka (in 1982–83 final)
10. Željko Jerkov (Jugoplastika) 34 points vs. Alco Bologna (in 1976–77 final)
11. Dino Rađa (Il Messaggero Roma) 34 points vs. Scavolini Pesaro (in first leg of 1991–92 final)
12. Saša Obradović (Alba Berlin) 34 points vs. Stefanel Milano (in first leg of 1994–95 final)
13. Teoman Alibegović (Alba Berlin) 34 points vs. Stefanel Milano (in second leg of 1994–95 final)

== Notes ==
- Coach Bogdan Tanjević made it to 5 Korać Cup finals with four different clubs, and lost all of them. In 1978 his Bosna team lost to Partizan 110–117 in overtime. Then in 1986 he made it to the very end again with Mobilgirgi Caserta, only to lose to Banco di Roma in a two legged final. Finally, in the '90s, Tanjević made 3 more finals, this time consecutively: with Stefanel Trieste in 1994 (lost to PAOK Bravo), and with Stefanel Milano in 1995 and 1996 (lost to Alba Berlin and Efes Pilsen, respectively).

== Sources ==
- FIBA Korać Cup
- Stats leaders

== See also ==
- FIBA Saporta Cup
- FIBA EuroCup Challenge
- FIBA EuroChallenge
- European Basketball Club Super Cup
- Rosters of the top basketball teams in European club competitions
