= 1972 FIBA Korać Cup =

- League: FIBA Korać Cup
- Sport: Basketball

Finals
- Champions: (Socialist Federal Republic of Yugoslavia) Lokomotiva
- Runners-up: (Socialist Federal Republic of Yugoslavia) OKK Beograd

FIBA Korać Cup seasons
- 1973 →

The 1972 FIBA Korać Cup was the inaugural edition of FIBA's competition for European basketball non national champions and cup winners, running from 4 January to 7 March 1972. 8 teams took part in the competition.

Lokomotiva from Zagreb defeated OKK Beograd (another Yugoslav club), in a two-legged final to become the competition's first champion.

== Season teams ==
Country	Teams	Clubs (ranking in 1970–71 national league)	
France	2	Olympique Antibes	Caen
Spain	2	Picadero	Manresa La Casera
(Socialist Federal Republic of Yugoslavia) Yugoslavia	2	OKK Beograd	Lokomotiva
Belgium	1	Standard Liège	
West Germany	1	USC München	

== Quarter finals ==
Team 1	Agg.	Team 2	1st leg	2nd leg
USC München (West Germany)	117–162	(Socialist Federal Republic of Yugoslavia) OKK Beograd	71–79	46–83
Manresa La Casera (Spain)	165–180	(France) Olympique Antibes	81–85	84–95
Caen (France)	170–212	(Socialist Federal Republic of Yugoslavia) Lokomotiva	83–109	87–103
Picadero (Spain)	140–160	(Belgium) Standard Liège	61–63	79–97

== Semi finals ==
Team 1	Agg.	Team 2	1st leg	2nd leg
OKK Beograd (Socialist Federal Republic of Yugoslavia)	160–137	(France) Olympique Antibes	99–72	61–65
Lokomotiva (Socialist Federal Republic of Yugoslavia)	167–145	(Belgium) Standard Liège	71–54	96–91

== Finals ==
Team 1	Agg.	Team 2	1st leg	2nd leg
OKK Beograd (Socialist Federal Republic of Yugoslavia)	156–165	(Socialist Federal Republic of Yugoslavia) Lokomotiva	83–71	73–94

1972 FIBA Korać Cup Champions

Lokomotiva
1st title
