= 1974–75 FIBA Korać Cup =

- League: FIBA Korać Cup
- Sport: Basketball

Finals
- Champions: (Italy) Birra Forst Cantù
- Runners-up: (Spain) CF Barcelona

FIBA Korać Cup seasons
- ← 1973–74 1975–76 →

The 1974–75 FIBA Korać Cup was the fourth edition of FIBA's new competition, running from 5 November 1974 to 25 March 1975. It was contested by 42 teams, five more than in the previous edition.

Birra Forst Cantù defeated CF Barcelona in the final to become the competition's first and only three-peat champion.

== Season teams ==
Country	Teams	Clubs (ranking in 1973–74 national league)							
France	8	Olympique Antibes	ASVEL	Caen	Chorale Mulsant	Monaco	ASPO Tours	JA Vichy	Denain Voltaire
Greece	4	YMCA Thessaloniki	Panellinios	Aris	PAOK				
Italy	4	Innocenti Milano	Birra Forst Cantù	Brina Rieti	IBP Stella Azzurra				
Belgium	3	Standard Liège	Éveil Monceau	Sunair Oostende					
Netherlands	3	Levi's Flamingo's	Nationale-Nederlanden Donar	Typsoos Lions					
Spain	3	CF Barcelona	YMCA España	Pineda					
West Germany	3	1.FC Bamberg	USC München	Wolfenbüttel					
Israel	2	Hapoel Gvat/Yagur	Hapoel Ramat Gan						
Luxembourg	2	Standard Diekirch	Etzella						
Soviet Union	2	Stroitel	Dynamo Moscow						
Switzerland	2	Union Neuchâtel	Vevey						
(Socialist Federal Republic of Yugoslavia) Yugoslavia	2	Bosna	Partizan						
Bulgaria	1	Levski-Spartak							
Portugal	1	Porto							
Scotland	1	Paisley							
Turkey	1	Galatasaray							

== First round ==
Team 1	Agg.	Team 2	1st leg	2nd leg
1.FC Bamberg (West Germany)	160–122	(Luxembourg) Standard Diekirch	82–56	78–66
USC München (West Germany)	139–193	(Italy) Brina Rieti	86–101	53–92
Panellinios (Greece)	135–147	(Belgium) Sunair Oostende	70–68	65–79
Union Neuchâtel (Switzerland)	146–246	(Spain) CF Barcelona	69–105	77–141
YMCA España (Spain)	219–114	(Scotland) Paisley	123–53	96–61
YMCA Thessaloniki (Greece)	153–160	(West Germany) Wolfenbüttel	73–69	80–91
Etzella (Luxembourg)	146–239	(Netherlands) Nationale-Nederlanden Donar	78–110	68–129
Éveil Monceau (Belgium)	156–184	(Bulgaria) Levski-Spartak	99–108	57–76
Hapoel Gvat/Yagur (Israel)	148–132	(Turkey) Galatasaray	84–64	64–68
Denain Voltaire (France)	166–143	(Spain) Pineda	83–58	83–85
Levi's Flamingo's (Netherlands)	192–198	(France) Monaco	105–107	87–91
Vevey (Switzerland)	165–193	(Socialist Federal Republic of Yugoslavia) Partizan	85–91	80–102
Typsoos Lions (Netherlands)	164–201	(Socialist Federal Republic of Yugoslavia) Bosna	81–79	83–122

== Second round ==
Team 1	Agg.	Team 2	1st leg	2nd leg
1.FC Bamberg (West Germany)	141–198	(France) ASPO Tours	72–77	69–121
Standard Liège (Belgium)	134–148	(Italy) Brina Rieti	69–67	65–81
Sunair Oostende (Belgium)	159–158	(France) Chorale Mulsant	81–79	78–79
CF Barcelona (Spain)	171–101	(Portugal) FC Porto	88–36	83–65
Olympique Antibes (France)	180–163	(Spain) YMCA España	106–82	74–81
Wolfenbüttel (West Germany)	164–181	(France) JA Vichy	102–86	62–95
Nationale-Nederlanden Donar (Netherlands)	154–169	(France) ASVEL	90–82	64–87
Levski-Spartak (Bulgaria)	124–120	(Greece) Aris	60–37	64–83
Hapoel Gvat/Yagur (Israel)	130–151	(Italy) IBP Stella Azzurra	59–72	71–79
Denain Voltaire (France)	170–174	(Italy) Innocenti Milano	96–76	74–98
Monaco (France)	194–186	(Israel) Hapoel Ramat Gan	84–74	110–112
Partizan (Socialist Federal Republic of Yugoslavia)	187–169	(France) Caen	100–79	87–90
PAOK (Greece)	150–157	(Socialist Federal Republic of Yugoslavia) Bosna	77–74	73–83

Automatically qualified to the round of 16

- (Italy) Birra Forst Cantù (title holder)
- (Soviet Union) Dynamo Moscow
- (Soviet Union) Stroitel

== Round of 16 ==
The round of 16 were played with a round-robin system, in which every Two Game series (TGS) constituted as one game for the record.

Key to colors
Top place in each group advance to semifinals

=== Group A ===
	Team	Pld	Pts	W	L	PF	PA	PD
1.	(Italy) Birra Forst Cantù	0	0	0	0	0	0	0
2.	(France) JA Vichy*	0	0	0	0	0	0	0
3.	(Soviet Union) Dynamo Moscow*	0	0	0	0	0	0	0
4.	(Soviet Union) Stroitel*	0	0	0	0	0	0	0

*Birra Forst Cantù qualifies directly for Semifinals after the withdrawal of the rest of participants in this group (JA Vichy, Dynamo Moscow and Stroitel).

=== Group B ===
	Team	Pld	Pts	W	L	PF	PA	PD
1.	(Socialist Federal Republic of Yugoslavia) Partizan	3	5	2	1	568	509	+59
2.	(Italy) Innocenti Milano	3	5	2	1	522	477	+45
3.	(France) ASPO Tours	3	5	2	1	528	494	+34
4.	(Belgium) Sunair Oostende	3	3	0	3	440	578	−138

=== Group C ===
	Team	Pld	Pts	W	L	PF	PA	PD
1.	(Italy) Brina Rieti	3	6	3	0	480	443	+37
2.	(France) ASVEL	3	5	2	1	535	483	+52
3.	(Bulgaria) Levski-Spartak	3	4	1	2	480	506	−26
4.	(France) Monaco	3	3	0	3	476	539	−63

=== Group D ===
	Team	Pld	Pts	W	L	PF	PA	PD
1.	(Spain) CF Barcelona	3	6	3	0	527	473	+54
2.	(Socialist Federal Republic of Yugoslavia) Bosna	3	5	2	1	491	494	−3
3.	(Italy) IBP Stella Azzurra	3	4	1	2	482	490	−8
4.	(France) Olympique Antibes	3	3	0	3	510	553	−43

== Semi finals ==
Team 1	Agg.	Team 2	1st leg	2nd leg
Partizan (Socialist Federal Republic of Yugoslavia)	168–172	(Italy) Birra Forst Cantù	101–88	67–84
Brina Rieti (Italy)	126–135	(Spain) CF Barcelona	63–48	63–87

== Finals ==
Team 1	Agg.	Team 2	1st leg	2nd leg
CF Barcelona (Spain)	154–181	(Italy) Birra Forst Cantù	69–71	85–110

1974–75 FIBA Korać Cup Champions

Birra Forst Cantù
3rd title
