= Yves-Marie Vérove =

French basketball player and coach (1949–2022)

Personal information
- Born: 22 October 1949 Grand-Fort-Philippe, France
- Died: 5 June 2022 (aged 72) Brest, France
- Listed height: 6 ft 3 in (1.91 m)

Career information
- Playing career: 1968–1995
- Position: power forward
- Coaching career: 1984–2005

Career history

Playing
- 1968–1969: Grand Fort Philippe
- 1969–1975: AS Berck
- 1975–1979: Caen
- 1979–1982: Limoges CSP
- 1982–1991: AS Berck
- 1991–1995: Ajaccio

Coaching
- 1984–1990: AS Berck
- 1990–1995: Ajaccio
- 1995–2005: Étendard de Brest

Yves-Marie Vérove (22 October 1949 – 5 June 2022) was a French basketball player and coach.

== Biography ==
Vérove was born and grew up in Grand-Fort-Philippe. In 1968, his local basketball team experienced great success, and he was signed by A.S. Berck Baskt, where he stayed from 1969 to 1975. With Berck, he won three French Basketball Championships before joining Caen Basket Calvados in 1976. In 1979, he moved to Limoges CSP, with whom he won the FIBA Korać Cup in 1982. In 1984, he began his career as a player-coach with AS Berck, before moving to Ajaccio Corse du Sud and Étendard de Brest. He retired from coaching in 2005 after leaving his job in Brest to Ron Stewart.

Vérove played in 32 games for the French national team from 1972 to 1976. He was the father of basketball players Jimmy Vérove and Franck Vérove. He died in Brest on 5 June 2022 at the age of 72.
