= Paul Henderson (basketball) =

American-French basketball player

Paul Henderson (born Mai 23, 1956 in Paradise, California) is an American-French former professional basketball player.

== Career ==
Henderson, a 6’7 (2.01 m) forward, played college basketball at Butte College and won Two-time California small schools Junior College Player of the Year honors. In 1976, he transferred to the University of Southern California. Seeing action in 26 games of the 1976–77 season, Henderson averaged 11.8 points and 7 rebounds per contest for USC.

He played for Élan béarnais Orthez in France from 1979 to 1991 and for Montpellier from 1991 to 1993. Playing under American head coach George Fisher at Orthez, Henderson won the European competition FIBA Korać Cup in 1984, scoring 20 points in the championship game against Red Star Belgrade, as well as the French national championship in 1986 and in 1987. With an average of 27.2 points per contest, Henderson was the leading scorer of the French league in the 1980–81 campaign. He left Orthez as the leading scorer in club history.

After his retirement, Henderson served as an assistant coach at Pau-Orthez until 2012. He is married to a French woman and was granted French nationality.
