= Bob Lienhard =

American basketball player (1948–2018)

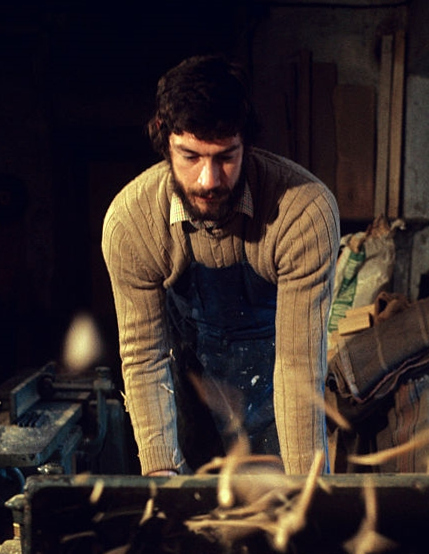
- Bob Lienhard engaged in carpentry works, his principal hobby. Italy, 1975.

Personal information
- Born: April 2, 1948 New York City, New York
- Died: September 22, 2018 (aged 70)
- Listed height: 6 ft 10 in (2.08 m)
- Listed weight: 245 lb (111 kg)

Career information
- High school: Rice (Manhattan, New York)
- College: Georgia (1967–1970)
- NBA draft: 1970: 4th round, 61st overall pick
- Drafted by: Phoenix Suns
- Playing career: 1970–1978
- Position: Center

Career history
- 1970–1978: Pallacanestro Cantù

Career highlights
- Second-team Parade All-American (1966)
- Stats at Basketball Reference

Bob Lienhard (April 2, 1948 – September 22, 2018) was an American basketball player. Lienhard was selected in the 1970 NBA draft by the Phoenix Suns but never played in the NBA. Lienhard played professionally for Pallacanestro Cantù in Italy. He played college basketball for the Georgia Bulldogs.

== College career ==
Lienhard became the Georgia’s all-time leading rebounder with 1,116 career rebounds. He also holds the single season record with 396 rebounds, as well as the single game record with 32 rebounds.

== Professional career ==
Lienhard was drafted by the National Basketball Association's Phoenix Suns in the 1970 NBA draft (10th pick of the 4th round, 61st overall), as well as by the American Basketball Association's Carolina Cougars in the 1970 ABA draft.

In 1970 he moved to Italy and played with Pallacanestro Cantu (1970–1978) with whom he won three Korać Cup, two European Cup Winner's Cup and one Intercontinental Cup.
