= Jean-Philippe Methelie =

French basketball player

Personal information
- Born: September 15, 1969 (age 57) Fort-de-France
- Listed height: 1.96 m (6 ft 5 in)

Career information
- High school: Saint-Joseph
- College: Castre BC
- Position: Small forward

Career history
- 1988-1991: Montpellier PSC
- 1991-1993: Montpellier Basket
- 1993-1996: Olympique Antibes
- 1996-1998: Pitch Cholet
- 1998-2004: Limoges CSP

Jean-Philippe Méthélie (born 15 September 1969 in Fort-de-France) is a former French basketballer.

== Biography ==
=== Youth ===
Jean-Philippe Méthélie began playing basketball in Martinique, for Saint-Joseph. His basketball qualities were noted in France, by Castres BC. He moved there in 1988. Jean Philippe Méthélie represented the French team for qualification for the European Junior Championships in 1988.

=== Montpellier, from 1988 to 1993 ===
In 1988, Jean-Philippe Méthélie joined Montpellier who played in the N1A. Little by little, Jean-Philippe Méthélie made a name for himself in the French championship, particularly with his three-point shots. In 1991, the Martiniquan took part in the World Military Games and became World Champion with the Blues. He stayed at Montpellier until 1993.

=== Olympique d'Antibes, from 1993 to 1996 ===
Then, Jean-Philippe Méthélie left to join Olympique d'Antibes, coached by Jacques Monclar. In his first season at Antibes (1993-1994), he took part in high-level European competition, in the FIBA Korać Cup. In 1995, Méthélie won the French Championship at Pau with the score at 80 to 81, with a buzzer-beater from Michael Ray Richardson, former NBA star for the New Jersey Nets. Antibes then took part in the EuroLeague. The 1995-1996 season was his best, with an average of 10.2 points, 3.7 rebounds, 0.8 interceptions and 1.1 decisive passes. In 1996, he left Antibes to join Cholet Basket.

=== Pitch Cholet from 1996 to 1998 ===
Cholet signed Jean-Philippe Méthélie for the 1996-1997 season. He showed that he was both a fantastic team player, but also a defensive master. Cholet finished 6th, and qualified for the FIBA Korać Cup. The 1997-1998 season was very good for Méthélie and his team. Cholet finished third in the French Championship, with a total of 20 wins, 10 defeats. Méthélie averaged 11.3 points, trois rebounds, two decisive passes and 1.1 interceptions per match. In the same season, he had the best three-point percentage with 59.5% (41 of 72 attempts). At the end of the season, he left to join Limoges CSP.

=== Limoges CSP from 1998 to 2004 ===
Méthélie was recruited by Limoges CSP. Jean-Philippe stayed CSP for the rest of his career. In his first season at Limoges, CSP did not perform well. The Cercle Saint-Pierre didn't make the top 3 for the league, finishing 7th. In the FIBA Saporta Cup, Limoges were eliminated in the last 16 by Région Wallonne. Méthélie also had a poor season personally. However, in the following season, (1999-2000) he improved.

Limoges had an exceptional season. In contrast to the 1999-2000 season, CSP recorded the best passing statistics since the start of the 1990s. The players took financial sacrifices to ensure the continuing survival of the club. The club was at risk of folding. Beaublanc and the Cercle Saint-Pierre players believed each match could be their last. This desperation and drive led to the players winning the FIBA Korać Cup against Malaga, and the coupe de France against PSG Racing, and finally the French Championship, against Asvel. CSP won the treble. Despite Méthélie and his team making history for the club, they were relegated to Pro B due to budget issues.

Méthélie alone of the treble winners re-signed for the 2000 season. He became captain of Limoges CSP. The 2000-2001 season saw them promoted back to the Pro A without much difficulty. Méthélie again had a good statistical average of over 10 points, almost 5 rebounds and 3 passes per match.

Méthélie's final three seasons at CSP were difficult. The yellow and garnets of Limoges struggled to maintain their position, while still trying to repay debt behind the scenes. In 2004, Méthélie was injured, and Limoges finished last (2003-2004 season) and were relegated beyond Pro B due to the large financial difficulties at the club. Eventually, it was agreed that Limoges would play in the NM1 rather than the NM3, as initially agreed. Méthélie retired from professional basketball, and returned to Martinique for good.

== Honours ==
- 1991 : World Military Champions
- 1994-1995 : Champion of France with Antibes
- 1997-1998 : Won the coupe de France with Cholet
- 1999-2000: Won the FIBA Korać Cup with Limoges
- 1999-2000: Won the coupe de France with Limoges
- 1999-2000: Champion of France with Limoges
- 2000-2001: Champion of France Pro B with Limoges

== Distinctions ==
- 1997-1998 : Best three-point shooter in Pro A with Cholet

== Caps ==
- France International Juniors
- France International Military
- 1988 : Took part in qualifications for the European Junior games with the French national team
- 1991 : Took part in the World Military Games with France
