= 1991–92 FIBA Korać Cup =

- League: FIBA Korać Cup
- Sport: Basketball

Finals
- Champions: (Italy) Il Messaggero Roma
- Runners-up: (Italy) Scavolini Pesaro

FIBA Korać Cup seasons
- ← 1990–91 1992–93 →

The 1991–92 FIBA Korać Cup was the 21st edition of FIBA's Korać Cup basketball competition. The Italian Il Messaggero Roma defeated the Italian Scavolini Pesaro in the final. This was Il Messaggero Roma's second time winning the title after a victory in 1986 playing as Banco di Roma.

== Team allocation ==
- 1st, 2nd, 3rd, etc.: League position after Playoffs of the previous season shown in parentheses
- TH: Title holder

Second round
| (Italy) Benetton Treviso (5th) | (Italy) Scavolini Pesaro (7th) | (Greece) AEK | (Spain) Taugrés |
| (Italy) Shampoo Clear Cantù (6th)^{TH} | (France) Pitch Cholet | | |
First round
| (Belgium) Bobcat Gent | (Poland) Polonia Warszawa | (Greece) Panathinaikos | (Finland) Saab UU |
| (Belgium) Go Pass Verviers-Pepinster | (Poland) Stal Bobrek Bytom | (Spain) CAI Zaragoza | (Italy) il Messaggero Roma (4th) |
| (Belgium) Kessel-Lo Leuven | (Turkey) Çukurova Üniversitesi | (Spain) Collado Villaiba | (Luxembourg) T71 Dudelange |
| (Belgium) Trane Castors Braine | (Turkey) Efes Pilsen | (Spain) Forum Filatélico Valladolid | (Netherlands) Selex Weert |
| (Czechoslovakia) Baník Cígeľ Prievidza | (Turkey) Paşabahçe | (Austria) Citroën Klagenfurt | (Portugal) Ovarense |
| (Czechoslovakia) Banik Handlová | (Turkey) TED Ankara Kolejliler | (Austria) Toshiba Klosterneuburg | (Romania) Dinamo Oradea |
| (Czechoslovakia) BVC Bioveta Brno | (France) Racing Club de Paris | (Israel) Hapoel Jerusalem | (Sweden) Alvik |
| (Czechoslovakia) Slavia Žilina | (France) Reims Champagne Basket | (Israel) Hapoel Tel Aviv | (Switzerland) Bellinzona |
| (Hungary) Körmendi Dózsa | (France) Saint-Quentin | (Socialist Federal Republic of Yugoslavia) Bosna | (Ukraine) Budivelnyk |
| (Hungary) Tungsram | (Germany) BSG Ludwigsburg | (Socialist Federal Republic of Yugoslavia) Vojvodina | (Soviet Union) Dynamo Moscow |
| (Hungary) Videoton | (Germany) Einheit Weißenfels | (Bulgaria) Levski-Spartak | |
| (Hungary) ZTE Heraklith | (Germany) TVG Trier | (Croatia) Zadar | |
| (Poland) Górnik Wałbrzych | (Greece) Iraklis | (Cyprus) AEL Limassol | |
| (Poland) Polfrost Bydgoszcz | (Greece) Nikas Peristeri | (England) Leicester Riders | |

== First round ==
| Team 1 | Agg. | Team 2 | 1st leg | 2nd leg |
|---|---|---|---|---|
| Trane Castors Braine (Belgium) | 172–174 | (Spain) Collado Villalba | 108–97 | 64–77 |
| Baník Handlová (Czechoslovakia) | 148–200 | (Greece) Iraklis | 79–89 | 69–111 |
| AEL (Cyprus) | 173–232 | (Socialist Federal Republic of Yugoslavia) Bosna | 83–107 | 90–125 |
| Toshiba Klosterneuburg (Austria) | 160–202 | (Greece) Nikas Peristeri | 82–98 | 78–104 |
| Polfrost Bydgoszcz (Poland) | 157–182 | (Belgium) Bobcat Gent | 75–87 | 82–95 |
| Saab UU (Finland) | 145–164 | (France) Racing Club de Paris | 87–97 | 58–67 |
| Kessel-Lo Leuven (Belgium) | 187–186 | (Switzerland) Bellinzona | 79–86 | 108–100 |
| Selex Weert (Netherlands) | 163–207 | (Spain) Fórum Filatélico Valladolid | 83–103 | 80–104 |
| Ovarense (Portugal) | 137–142 | (France) Reims | 71–66 | 66–76 |
| Go Pass Verviers-Pepinster (Belgium) | 179–203 | (Italy) Il Messaggero Roma | 89–99 | 90–104 |
| Citroën Klagenfurt (Austria) | 112–183 | (Socialist Federal Republic of Yugoslavia) Vojvodina | 62–98 | 50–85 |
| Saint-Quentin (France) | 131–134 | (Greece) Panathinaikos | 69–57 | 62–77 |
| Tungsram (Hungary) | 195–184 | (Czechoslovakia) Slavia Žilina | 111–96 | 84–88 |
| Leicester Riders (England) | 145–250 | (Spain) CAI Zaragoza | 69–112 | 76–138 |
| Stal Bobrek Bytom (Poland) | 178–193 | (Turkey) TED Ankara Kolejliler | 93–98 | 85–95 |
| Körmendi Dózsa (Hungary) | 158–180 | (Croatia) Zadar | 85–97 | 73–83 |
| Polonia Warszawa (Poland) | 203–182 | (Germany) Einheit Weißenfels | 118–97 | 85–85 |
| Dynamo Moscow (Soviet Union) | 200–217 | (Israel) Hapoel Tel Aviv | 90–102 | 110–115 |
| Levski-Spartak (Bulgaria) | 143–168 | (Israel) Hapoel Jerusalem | 83–84 | 60–84 |
| ZTE Heraklith (Hungary) | 161–211 | (Turkey) Efes Pilsen | 73–112 | 88–99 |
| Baník Cígeľ Prievidza (Czechoslovakia) | 151–163 | (Turkey) Çukurova Üniversitesi | 87–83 | 64–80 |
| T71 Dudelange (Luxembourg) | 121–186 | (Germany) Ludwigsburg | 72–96 | 49–90 |
| Paşabahçe (Turkey) | 181–165 | (Sweden) Alvik | 103–73 | 78–92 |
| TVG Trier (Germany) | 178–164 | (Czechoslovakia) BVC Bioveta Brno | 98–62 | 80–102 |
| Górnik Wałbrzych (Poland) | 150–151 | (Hungary) Videoton | 82–66 | 68–85 |
| Budivelnyk (Ukraine) | 192–148 | (Romania) Dinamo Oradea | 113–67 | 79–81 |

== Second round ==
| Team 1 | Agg. | Team 2 | 1st leg | 2nd leg |
|---|---|---|---|---|
| Collado Villalba (Spain) | 181–182 | (Greece) Iraklis | 84–89 | 97–93 |
| Bosna (Socialist Federal Republic of Yugoslavia) | 165–169 | (Greece) Nikas Peristeri | 84–84 | 81–85 |
| Bobcat Gent (Belgium) | 128–155 | (France) Racing Club de Paris | 67–74 | 61–81 |
| Kessel-Lo Leuven (Belgium) | 160–184 | (Spain) Fórum Filatélico Valladolid | 84–83 | 76–101 |
| Reims (France) | 125–166 | (Italy) Il Messaggero Roma | 54–72 | 71–94 |
| Vojvodina (Socialist Federal Republic of Yugoslavia) | 145–155 | (Greece) Panathinaikos | 77–74 | 68–81 |
| Tungsram (Hungary) | 155–199 | (Spain) CAI Zaragoza | 96–113 | 59–86 |
| TED Ankara Kolejliler (Turkey) | 171–184 | (Croatia) Zadar | 76–86 | 95–98 |
| Polonia Warszawa (Poland) | 145–214 | (Israel) Hapoel Tel Aviv | 75–98 | 70–116 |
| Hapoel Jerusalem (Israel) | 195–181 | (Turkey) Efes Pilsen | 99–78 | 96–103 |
| Çukurova Üniversitesi (Turkey) | 133–168 | (Italy) Benetton Treviso | 64–82 | 69–86 |
| Ludwigsburg (Germany) | 165–184 | (Spain) Taugrés | 91–94 | 74–90 |
| Paşabahçe (Turkey) | 147–153 | (Italy) Shampoo Clear Cantù | 80–72 | 67–81 |
| TVG Trier (Germany) | 138–224 | (Italy) Scavolini Pesaro | 69–115 | 69–109 |
| Videoton (Hungary) | 139–165 | (Greece) AEK | 70–81 | 69–84 |
| Budivelnyk (Ukraine) | 141–170 | (France) Pitch Cholet | 76–92 | 65–78 |

== Round of 16 ==
Key to colors
| Top two places in each group advance to quarterfinals |

=== Group A ===
| Pos | Team | Pld | W | L | PF | PA | PD | Pts | SCA | PAR | AEK | HAP |
|---|---|---|---|---|---|---|---|---|---|---|---|---|
| 1 | (Italy) Scavolini Pesaro | 6 | 5 | 1 | 549 | 432 | +117 | 11 | — | 93–64 | 96–65 | 94–84 |
| 2 | (France) Racing Club de Paris | 6 | 3 | 3 | 434 | 452 | −18 | 9 | 61–73 | — | 63–55 | 84–71 |
| 3 | (Greece) AEK | 6 | 3 | 3 | 451 | 474 | −23 | 9 | 83–81 | 68–71 | — | 88–80 |
| 4 | (Israel) Hapoel Jerusalem | 6 | 1 | 5 | 485 | 561 | −76 | 7 | 75–112 | 92–91 | 83–92 | — |

Source: FIBA Europe

=== Group B ===
| Pos | Team | Pld | W | L | PF | PA | PD | Pts | ROM | CHO | ZAR | PAO |
|---|---|---|---|---|---|---|---|---|---|---|---|---|
| 1 | (Italy) Il Messaggero Roma | 6 | 5 | 1 | 525 | 491 | +34 | 11 | — | 95–88 | 97–72 | 84–75 |
| 2 | (France) Pitch Cholet | 6 | 4 | 2 | 501 | 463 | +38 | 10 | 83–69 | — | 77–76 | 90–68 |
| 3 | (Spain) CAI Zaragoza | 6 | 2 | 4 | 466 | 485 | −19 | 8 | 77–81 | 80–79 | — | 94–80 |
| 4 | (Greece) Panathinaikos | 6 | 1 | 5 | 465 | 518 | −53 | 7 | 96–99 | 75–84 | 71–67 | — |

Source: FIBA Europe

=== Group C ===
| Pos | Team | Pld | W | L | PF | PA | PD | Pts | FFV | CAN | HTA | IRA |
|---|---|---|---|---|---|---|---|---|---|---|---|---|
| 1 | (Spain) Fórum Filatélico Valladolid | 6 | 5 | 1 | 508 | 490 | +18 | 11 | — | 70–92 | 76–74 | 94–76 |
| 2 | (Italy) Shampoo Clear Cantù | 6 | 4 | 2 | 517 | 483 | +34 | 10 | 71–84 | — | 79–72 | 96–73 |
| 3 | (Israel) Hapoel Tel Aviv | 6 | 3 | 3 | 551 | 515 | +36 | 9 | 88–89 | 104–94 | — | 106–79 |
| 4 | (Greece) Iraklis | 6 | 0 | 6 | 495 | 583 | −88 | 6 | 89–95 | 80–85 | 98–107 | — |

Source: FIBA Europe

=== Group D ===
| Pos | Team | Pld | W | L | PF | PA | PD | Pts | TAU | ZAD | BEN | PER |
|---|---|---|---|---|---|---|---|---|---|---|---|---|
| 1 | (Spain) Taugrés | 6 | 4 | 2 | 526 | 519 | +7 | 10 | — | 79–72 | 88–83 | 89–82 |
| 2 | (Croatia) Zadar | 6 | 4 | 2 | 559 | 528 | +31 | 10 | 100–97 | — | 90–96 | 118–92 |
| 3 | (Italy) Benetton Treviso | 6 | 3 | 3 | 533 | 513 | +20 | 9 | 98–86 | 81–90 | — | 103–66 |
| 4 | (Greece) Nikas Peristeri | 6 | 1 | 5 | 500 | 558 | −58 | 7 | 84–87 | 83–89 | 93–72 | — |

Source: FIBA Europe

== Quarterfinals ==
| Team 1 | Agg. | Team 2 | 1st leg | 2nd leg |
|---|---|---|---|---|
| Racing Club de Paris (France) | 142–151 | (Italy) Il Messaggero Roma | 70–71 | 72–80 |
| Pitch Cholet (France) | 163–178 | (Italy) Scavolini Pesaro | 74–78 | 89–100 |
| Shampoo Clear Cantù (Italy) | 164–150 | (Spain) Taugrés | 86–73 | 78–77 |
| Zadar (Croatia) | 171–178 | (Spain) Fórum Filatélico Valladolid | 80–95 | 91–83 |

== Semifinals ==
| Team 1 | Agg. | Team 2 | 1st leg | 2nd leg |
|---|---|---|---|---|
| Il Messaggero Roma (Italy) | 142–137 | (Spain) Fórum Filatélico Valladolid | 76–70 | 66–67 |
| Shampoo Clear Cantù (Italy) | 162–163 | (Italy) Scavolini Pesaro | 76–74 | 86–89 |

== Finals ==
| Team 1 | Agg. | Team 2 | 1st leg | 2nd leg |
|---|---|---|---|---|
| Il Messaggero Roma (Italy) | 193–180 | (Italy) Scavolini Pesaro | 94–94 | 99–86 |

== Rosters ==
(Italy) Virtus Roma: Alessandro Fantozzi (C),, Andrea Niccolai, Roberto Premier, Dino Radja, Rickey Mahorn; Stefano Attruia, Donato Avenia, Fausto Bargna, Davide Croce. Coach: Paolo Di Fonzo
(Italy) Scavolini Pesaro: Haywoode Workman, Andrea Gracis, Darren Daye, Walter Magnifico (C), Ario Costa; Alessandro Boni, Paolo Calbini, Giovanni Grattoni, Domenico Zampolini. Coach: Alberto Bucci

1991–92 FIBA Korać Cup Champions

Il Messaggero Roma
2nd title
