= Pallacanestro Cantù =

Italian professional basketball team

- Leagues: LBA
- Founded: 1936
- History: Associazione Pallacanestro Cantù; 1936–1940; Opera Nazionale Dopolavoro Cantù; 1940–1948; Pallacanestro Cantù; 1948–present
- Arena: Palasport Pianella; PalaDesio
- Capacity: 3,910 (Pianella); 6,700 (PalaDesio)
- Location: Cantù, Lombardy, Italy
- Team colors: White, Blue, Sky Blue
- President: Roberto Allievi
- Head coach: Francesco Vitucci
- Ownership: Tutti Insieme Cantù Srl
- Championships: 2 EuroLeagues; 4 Saporta Cups; 4 Korac Cups; 2 Intercontinental Cups; 3 Italian Leagues; 2 Italian Supercups; 1 Italian LNP Cup
- Website: Official website
Home	Away

Pallacanestro Cantù, known for sponsorship reasons as Acqua S.Bernardo Cantù, is an Italian professional basketball club based in Cantù, Lombardy. On the European-wide club competition scene, Cantù is second to Real Madrid – against whom they have an 8–2 record – for European trophies won, with twelve (two EuroLeague, four FIBA Saporta Cups, four FIBA Korać Cups and two FIBA Intercontinental Cups), in addition to three domestic leagues and two Italian Supercups.

== History ==
=== 1936–1969: Formation and early years ===
The club was founded as Associazione Pallacanestro Cantù in 1936 with impetus from Mario Broggi and Angiolino Polli. At a time when basketball was an unknown sport in Italy, a group composed of Broggi, Polli, Attilio Molteni, Peppino Borghi, Alberto Broggi, Vittorio Sgariboldi, Nene Marchi and Peppino Colombo started to play in the courtyard of the Sacramentine Sisters Institute. A name change in 1940 saw the club become Opera Nazionale Dopolavoro Cantù, winning their first major trophy in 1942 with the Bruno Mussolini Trophy after a squad coached by Luigi Cicoria won against Pallacanestro Varese and General Cantore Milano. The club re-emerged after World War II as Pallacanestro Cantù, playing in the third division Serie C in 1949. It then reached the second division Serie B in 1953 and the first division Serie A in 1954, though they downgraded after one season. The Broggi brothers retired during this period, replaced on the court by Lino Cappelletti (the first Cantù player to make the Italian national team) Lietti, Ronchetti and Quarta, whilst the squad was sponsored by the Milenka distillery.

Returning to the Serie A in 1956, the club was sponsored by Ettore Casella through his Oransoda brand, and two years later he became the club's owner, nominating Aldo Allievi as president. The arrival of Tony Vlastelica allowed Cantù, now playing in a covered Parini arena, to finish fourth in 1957–58 and start challenging Minganti Bologna and Simmenthal Milano. Over the summer, Casella transferred his Oransoda sponsorship to Virtus Bologna whilst using another of his brands, Fonte Levissima, for Cantù, whilst Gianni Corsolini was named coach. After Cappelletti retired, he was replaced in 1962 by a young player from Milano, Carlo Recalcati. Recalcati, along with the "wall of Cantù" – composed of Bob Burgess (arrived from Real Madrid), Alberto De Simone and Alberto Merlati – Antonio Frigerio and Carlos D'Aquila formed the team – coached by Borislav Stanković – that would win the club's first ever Serie A title in 1967–68.

=== 1969–1979: The second scudetto ===
The 1969 off-season saw Erminio Casella (who had replaced his father as owner after his death in 1967) leave the club, with Allievi stepping in to take his place. Arnaldo Taurisano was named coach and Pierluigi Marzorati joined, and stayed fifteen years with the club. Though Ignis and Simmenthal had a hold on the Italian league during that period, a Birra Forst-sponsored squad composed of Marzorati, Recalcati, Antonio Farina, Ciccio Della Fiori and Renzo Tombolato captured three successive FIBA Korać Cups in 1973, 1974 and 1975, beating respectively Maes Pils, Partizan from Belgrade and FC Barcelona. The 1974–75 season ended with the club earning their second scudetto with players such as Marzorati, Della Fiori, Recalcati, Farina, Tombolato, Bob Lienhard, Franco Meneghel and Mario Beretta, who later in that same year would add the FIBA Intercontinental Cup, beating Real Madrid and the final runners-up Amazonas Franca on the way. Harthorne Wingo joined the squad in 1976 and led the club to another European title, the 1977 Cup Winners' Cup claimed against Radnički Belgrade, a title repeated the next year over Sinudyne Bologna, whilst John Neumann helped them achieve the three-peat in 1979 by beating EBBC.

=== 1979–1984: The European title ===
The form from these seasons would continue into the 1980s, thanks to a squad coached by Valerio Bianchini with Americans Tom Boswell and Bruce Flowers, future Serie A all-time top scorer Antonello Riva, Renzo Bariviera, Denis Innocentin, Giorgio Cattini, Fausto Bargna and Marzorati. The latter, along with Riva, were decisive in the Italian's fourth Cup Winners' Cup in 1981 with an 86–81 win over FC Barcelona, also helping them win their third scudetto that same year. They earned a place in the 1981–82 Champions Cup, despite a rocky start as Bianchini did not travel with the squad early in the season, whilst Marzorati and Bariviera were injured. They lost 85–87 away to Maccabi Tel Aviv after a basket by new signing C. J. Kupec was disallowed. They travelled to Belgrade needing to win, or lose by 15 or fewer points against Partizan to reach the final, which they managed as they lost 89–104 after Dražen Dalipagić scored 55 points. Again pitted against Maccabi Tel Aviv in the final, Squibb Cantù brought 1,200 fans to Cologne on 25 May 1982, winning 86–80 thanks to 23 points from Kupec, 21 from Flowers, and 18 apiece for Marzorati and Riva. Though they conceded their league title to Bologna from Sinudyne in the play-off quarterfinals, they defended their European title in the 1982–83 edition as title holders, where they faced a decisive game, overcoming CSKA Moscow 106–73 to reach the final against rivals Billy Milano. The game in Grenoble was close, with Jim Brewer blocking John Gianelli's second-to-last shot to see the team emerge 69–68 winners as fans swamped the court while Marzorati held the cup, the team's other American, Wallace Bryant, had 18 points as did Riva, with Brewer adding 14.

=== 1984–1994: Forty years in the first division ===
The rest of the 1980s saw the club stay competitive but failing to add any titles despite counting American players like Dan Gay, Richard Anderson, Lorenzo Charles, Jeff Turner and Kent Benson, stalling in the league playoffs and losing the 1989 Korać Cup to Vlade Divac's Partizan.

Riva had left for Milano in 1988 but Pace Mannion joined the club and was decisive in the conquest of the 1991 Korać Cup, scoring eight consecutive three-pointers to down Real Madrid, with Marzorati ending his career with another title. At the second season of Fabrizio Frates as head coach of the team, Clear Cantù made another season in the 1991–92 FIBA Korać Cup after having reached the semi-finals of the competition, where they lost to Scavolini Pesaro for one point difference (a 76–74 home win and a 86–89 defeat in Pesaro). The 1992–93 season established the good performances in Europe (1992–93 FIBA Korać Cup). Clear Cantù ended the season in the semi-final losing to another Italian club after being surrounded by "Saša" Đorđević's Philips Milano (who subsequently won the trophy). In Serie A, although the team ranked fifth in the regular season, they ruled the play-off quarterfinals thanks to Stefanel Trieste with 2–0 wins. In the semi-finals the barrier of knorr Bologna proved impossible to overcome. However, the team qualified to compete in the next season's FIBA European League and to return in the top European basketball club's competition after an absence of nine years. The 1993–94 season saw the club playing in FIBA European League against European clubs like Efes Pilsen, Panathinaikos, 7up Joventut, Buckler Beer Bologna, Cibona or Pau-Orthez (ranked 8th and last in the group B with 2–12 record) and changing coaches and foreign players but this could not prevent the team from downgrading to the second division, ending a forty-year tenure in the first division, the Allievi family conceded the ownership to Franco Polti in its wake.

=== 1994–2009: 70th anniversary ===
The team returned to the first division after two seasons, with coach Dado Lombardi and Thurl Bailey helping Polti Cantù reach the Italian Cup final and an eighth place in the league on its return season. Francesco Corrado bought the club in 1999. During the course of the season, player Enrico Ravaglia died in a car crash, and the team – with a returning Riva – regrouped on the court. The 2000–01 season started badly, which led to the incumbent coach being replaced by long-time youth coach Stefano Sacripanti who guided the club to win. He would do better the next season, leading an American-centric group of Jerry McCullough, Bootsy Thornton, Sam Hines, Shaun Stonerook, Todd Lindeman and Ryan Hoover to a fourth place in the league, enough to qualify for the EuroLeague (though Corrado decided to renounce participating for financial reasons).

The 2002–03 season saw the club reach the Italian Cup final, though it would concede the title to Benetton Treviso. They would avenge their loss by beating Treviso in their own arena in the 2003 Italian Supercup. Reaching the league playoffs on a number of occasions, Cantù also returned to Europe, participating in the 2004–05 ULEB Cup and the 2005–06 FIBA EuroCup. The club celebrated its 70th anniversary during the 2006–2007 season; as part of the commemoration, a 54 year old Marzorati played during an October 2006 game, beating records as the oldest ever professional basketball player and the only player to have played for the same club in five different decades. When Corrado left the club to become president of Lega Basket, his son Alessandro became the eighth president in team history, another change saw Sacripanti leave for Scavolini Pesaro and be replaced by Luca Dalmonte. During the summer 2008, Cantù was brought by the NGC group led by Eugenio Cremascoli along with his children Paolo and Anna, though Corrado remained president.

=== 2009–present: Recovery ===
Dalmonte left in 2009 and was replaced by young coach Andrea Trinchieri, who took the club to the Italian Cup Final Eight and the fourth place in the league, before reaching the playoff semi-finals where they lost to holders Montepaschi Siena, earning a place in the next year's EuroCup.

The next season, Trinchieri led a squad with long-time players such as captain Nicolas Mazzarino, Manuchar Markoishvili, Maarty Leunen and Vladimir Micov to first the Italian Cup final and then the league final, where they would lose to frequent champions Siena. Meanwhile, Anna Cremascoli became the club's president in September 2011, the first woman ever to hold the position at a Serie A club (she would be joined by other part-owners in 2014, including the team's fans with a 10% share, though she remained president and majority owner). Having earned a place in the 2011–12 Euroleague, the Italians reached the Top 16 thanks to a buzzer beater from Gianluca Basile against Gescrap Bizkaia Bilbao. Placed in a tough Group H with Maccabi Tel Aviv and FC Barcelona Regal, they tied Tel Aviv for second but exited on points scored, losing the penultimate game to Barcelona by a single point as Basile could not repeat his earlier exploit. Meanwhile, they played in the Supercup and Italian Cup finals but lost both to Montepaschi Siena, whilst in the league they were defeated in the quarter-finals by Scavolini Pesaro.

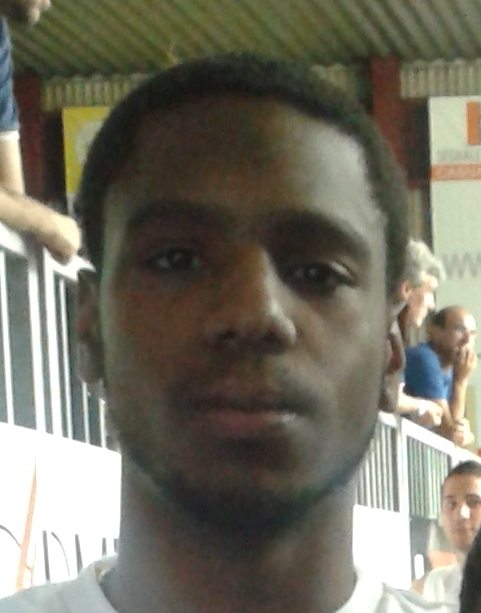
Joe Ragland

The 2012 summer saw main sponsor Bennet leave, to be replaced by Mapooro, a brand from the NGC group, whilst the squad saw wholesale changes with Basile leaving and eight new players coming in. Mapooro Cantù beat Siena to win the Supercup, then triumphed in the qualifying rounds (organised at "home" in the PalaDesio) to reach the EuroLeague regular season. Though they beat Real Madrid and Fenerbahçe Ülker they exited at the group stage after losing to the Turks in Istanbul, where Manuchar Markoishvili went mid-season by transferring to Galatasaray. The now Lenovo-sponsored team came back from a shaky start to crack the league playoffs, where – thanks to the arrival of Joe Ragland – they reached the semi-finals, losing the seven-game series against Acea Roma in the last game. Trinchieri left the club over the summer and was replaced by Sacripanti, whilst Daniele Della Fiori replaced Bruno Arrigoni as general manager and Acqua Vitasnella became main sponsor. A solid season saw the side reach the Italian Cup Final 8, the EuroCup Last 32 and the league playoffs, remaining unbeaten at home during all of the latter's regular season, though they lost their quarter-finals series against Roma. Known as FoxTown Cantù in Europe, the team went to the EuroCup Round of 16 before exiting at the hands of UNICS.

Domestically, they reached the playoffs again, with help from NBA All-Star Metta World Peace who joined the club in March, but were undone in the last game of the quarter-final series against Reyer Venezia. In November 2015, the club was bought by Ukrainian-Russian billionaire Dmitry Gerasimenko: in the first weeks of its ownership he announced he planned to build a new arena, brought in coach Sergey Bazarevich and four new players.

In August 2016, the club brought in coach Rimas Kurtinaitis from Khimki.

== Arena ==
Cantù started playing in the uncovered courtyard of the Sacramentine Sisters Institute before moving to another outside court on Piazza Parini. A covered arena, the PalaParini, was built in 1956 (when the Italian Basketball Federation disallowed the use of outside courts). They played there until moving to the newly built Palasport Pianella for the 1974–75 season.

When they qualified for the EuroLeague in 2011, they had to move to the PalaDesio for their games, 15 km away from Cantù in Desio, as the Pianella did not meet EuroLeague standards. The PalaDesio itself underwent a €130,000 refurbishment over the summer, with changes to the court, electrical installations and outside area that made it in line with the aforementioned standards. They also played their European games in Desio the next season, in addition to a number of domestic games over the next seasons (one game during 2010–11, four more the next season, then two local derbies against Vanoli Cremona and Milano in 2014–15).

The arena situation has driven a wedge between the club management and the local authorities as a promised new venue to replace the obsolete Pianella (which costs around €400,000 in upkeep, ten times more than most Serie A arenas) has not yet been built, whilst renting the PalaDesio full-time would prove too costly.

On July 6, 2016, there was the official presentation of the project for the new arena in Cucciago, Cantù. The project consists of a renovation and an extension of the Palasport Pianella, with the increase of capacity from 3,910 to 5,634. Inside the building, there will be a new museum dedicated to the club, a cafe/restaurant, a gym, a children fun area, a new team's training court and the offices of the club. It will be the fourth largest basketball arena in Lega Basket Serie A. Construction will last between 11 and 13 months.

== Players ==
=== Current roster ===
Acqua S.Bernardo Cantù roster
Players
Coaches

Pos.	No.	Nat.	Name	Ht.	Wt.	Age
F	1	(United States)	Flagg, Savion	2.01 m (6 ft 7 in)	102 kg (225 lb)	27 – 26 May 1999
PG	3	(United States)	Gravett, Hassani	1.88 m (6 ft 2 in)	85 kg (187 lb)	30 – 16 July 1996
F	4	(Italy)	Pavese, Riccardo (Y)	2.06 m (6 ft 9 in)	106 kg (234 lb)	18 – 1 February 2008
G	5	(Italy)	Molteni, Matteo (Y)	1.78 m (5 ft 10 in)	75 kg (165 lb)	18 – 27 April 2008
C	8	(Italy)	Okeke, Leonardo	2.13 m (7 ft 0 in)	108 kg (238 lb)	23 – 16 July 2003
G/F	9	(Italy)	Moraschini, Riccardo (C)	1.94 m (6 ft 4 in)	93 kg (205 lb)	35 – 8 January 1991
PG	10	(Italy)	Parravicini, Matteo	1.86 m (6 ft 1 in)	84 kg (185 lb)	25 – 4 July 2001
G/F	11	(Italy)	Ventura, Simone	2.00 m (6 ft 7 in)	89 kg (196 lb)	17 – 6 June 2009
PG	21	(United States)	Smith, Mike	1.80 m (5 ft 11 in)	84 kg (185 lb)	29 – 13 October 1997
C	22	(United States)	Brown, Chad	2.06 m (6 ft 9 in)	111 kg (245 lb)	30 – 6 September 1996
PF	24	(Latvia)	Gražulis, Andrejs	2.02 m (6 ft 8 in)	101 kg (223 lb)	33 – 21 July 1993
PG	25	(Italy)	Moretti, Davide	1.90 m (6 ft 3 in)	81 kg (179 lb)	28 – 25 March 1998
SF	27	(Italy)	Udom, Liam	2.01 m (6 ft 7 in)	111 kg (245 lb)	26 – 27 June 2000
F	31	(Lithuania)	Olisevičius, Osvaldas	2.00 m (6 ft 7 in)	90 kg (198 lb)	33 – 10 January 1993
G	32	(United States)	Green, Erick	1.90 m (6 ft 3 in)	85 kg (187 lb)	35 – 9 May 1991
C	36	(Italy)	Bagordo, Federico (Y)	2.03 m (6 ft 8 in)	91 kg (201 lb)	17 – 8 October 2009

Head coach

- (Italy) Francesco Vitucci

Assistant coach(es)

- (Italy) Mattia Consoli
- (Italy) Mattia Costacurta

Legend

- (C) Team captain
- (Y) Youth player
- Injured

- Roster
Updated: November 22, 2026

Note: Flags indicate national team eligibility at FIBA-sanctioned events. Players may hold other non-FIBA nationalities not displayed.

=== Depth chart ===
Pos.	Starting 5	Bench 1	Bench 2	Bench 3	Inactive
C	Chad Brown *	Leonardo Okeke †		Federico Bagordo ‡
PF	Savion Flagg *	Andrejs Gražulis °
SF	Osvaldas Olisevičius °	Liam Udom †		Riccardo Pavese ‡
SG	Riccardo Moraschini †	Matteo Molteni ‡			Simone Ventura ‡ (injured)
PG	Hassani Gravett ^	Davide Moretti †	Matteo Parravicini †

Notes: LBA clubs can choose between two main roster composition and foreign player formulas:

- 5+5 Formula: 5 Italian players and 5 foreign players.
- 3+4+5 Formula: 5 Italian players, 3 non-EU (European Union) foreigners, and 4 EU foreigners (including countries from the Cotonou Agreement).

Blue † – Homegrown player; (Note: A homegrown player (known in Italy as an atleta di formazione italiana) is defined by where they received their basketball training, rather than their actual passport or nationality. To be officially classified as a homegrown player by the Italian Basketball Federation (FIP), an athlete must complete at least four seasons in an Italian club’s youth academy (between the ages of 14 and 21), appearing in a minimum of 14 games per season. In EuroLeague, the team did not have any limitations regarding the number of Homegrown players.) Red * – Non-EU foreign player; (Note: A non-EU foreigner is a player from a country with no special trade or labor agreement with the European Union. In professional basketball, this primarily applies to players from the United States, Canada, Australia, and parts of Asia or non-EU Europe who do not possess a secondary European passport.) Purple °; – EU Foreign player (Note: "EU Foreign" players: An EU foreign player is a player who holds citizenship in a European Union (EU) member state (or an associated territory) but is not a citizen of the country where the league is based. Minimum of 4 EU Foreign players must be included on the active roster using the 3+4+5 formula) Gold ^; – Cotonou Agreement player (Note: "Cotonou Agreement" players: A Cotonou Agreement player (often called a "Cotonou player") is a basketball player who holds a passport from one of the 79 African, Caribbean, or Pacific (ACP) nations that signed the Cotonou Agreement with the European Union. In the LBA, these athletes are treated exactly like EU citizens and do not count against strict non-EU import quotas. The Cotonou Agreement is a political and trade treaty originally signed in 2000. Following a legal precedent known as the Kolpak ruling, European courts determined that citizens of countries with trade agreements guaranteeing non-discrimination against workers must have the same right to free movement of labor as EU citizens. Because of this ruling, if an LBA club chooses the 3+4+5 team-building formula, Cotonou players can be signed to fill the 4 EU foreigner roster spots, leaving the team’s 3 non-EU spots completely open for American or other traditional import players.) Green ‡ – youth player (Note: "Youth" players: players who are under the age of 20. In the context of European basketball and the LBA, youth players act as a bridge for clubs to fill out their active game-day rosters while meeting domestic requirements. To satisfy the "Italian player" requirement in the 5+5 or 3+4+5 formulas, a player does not technically have to be born in Italy. They can qualify as "homegrown" (Italian-trained) if they spent at least three consecutive seasons in an Italian club's youth academy between the ages of 15 and 21.)

=== Retired numbers ===
Pallacanestro Cantù retired numbers
No	Nat.	Player	Position	Tenure	Date retired	Ref.
6	(Italy)	Chicco Ravaglia	PG	1999	1999	
14	(Italy)	Pierluigi Marzorati	PG	1969–1991; 2006	September 12, 1991	

== Season by season ==
Season	Tier	League	Pos.	Italian Supercup	Italian Cup	LNP Cup	European competitions	
1967–68	1	Serie A	1st					
1968–69	1	Serie A	6th		Eighthfinalist		1 Champions Cup	QF
1969–70	1	Serie A	6th		Eighthfinalist			
1970–71	1	Serie A	3rd		Semifinalist			
1971–72	1	Serie A	3rd		Semifinalist			
1972–73	1	Serie A	3rd		Semifinalist		2 Korać Cup	W
1973–74	1	Serie A	3rd		Quarterfinalist		2 Korać Cup	W
2000–01	1	Serie A	4th	Regular season	Quarterfinalist			
2001–02	1	Serie A	16th					
2002–03	1	Serie A	5th		Runner-up			
2003–04	1	Serie A	6th	Champion	Semifinalist			
2004–05	1	Serie A	6th		Semifinalist		2 ULEB Cup	RS
2005–06	1	Serie A	14th				2 FIBA EuroCup	SS
2006–07	1	Serie A	8th					
2007–08	1	Serie A	7th					
2008–09	1	Serie A	9th		Quarterfinalist			
2009–10	1	Serie A	4th		Quarterfinalist			
2010–11	1	Serie A	2nd		Runner-up		2 Eurocup	RS
2011–12	1	Serie A	5th	Runner-up	Runner-up		1 Euroleague	T16
2012–13	1	Serie A	4th	Champion	Quarterfinalist		1 Euroleague	RS
2013–14	1	Serie A	5th		Quarterfinalist		2 Eurocup	L32
2014–15	1	Serie A	7th				2 Eurocup	EF
2015–16	1	Serie A	11th				3 FIBA Europe Cup	L32
2016–17	1	LBA	14th					
2017–18	1	LBA	7th		Semifinalist			
2018–19	1	LBA	10th				3 Champions League	QR2
2019–20	1	LBA	11th (Note: On March 8, 2020, the Italian government halted the league until April 3, 2020, due to the coronavirus pandemic in Italy. On April 7, 2020, after a month of suspension, the Italian Basketball Federation officially ended the 2019–20 season.)					
2020–21	1	LBA	15th	Group stage				
2021–22	2	Serie A2	3rd			Runner-up		
2022–23	2	Serie A2	3rd			Semifinalist		
2023–24	2	Serie A2	2nd			Semifinalist		
2024–25	2	Serie A2	1st			Champion		

== Honours ==
Total titles: 20

=== Domestic competitions ===
- Italian League

Winners (3): 1967–68, 1974–75, 1980–81
Runners-up (2): 1979–80, 2010–11

- Italian Cup

Runners-up (4): 1996–97, 2002–03, 2010–11, 2011–12

- Italian Supercup

Winners (2): 2003, 2012
Runners-up (1): 2011

- Italian LNP Cup

Winners (1): 2024–25

=== European competitions ===
- EuroLeague

Winners (2): 1981–82, 1982–83
Semifinalists (1): 1975–76

- FIBA Saporta Cup

Winners (4): 1976–77, 1977–78, 1978–79, 1980–81
Runners-up (1): 1979–80

- FIBA Korać Cup

Winners (4): 1973, 1973–74, 1974–75, 1990–91
Runners-up (1): 1988–89
Semifinalists (2): 1991–92, 1992–93

=== Worldwide competitions ===
- FIBA Intercontinental Cup

Winners (2): 1975, 1982
Runners-up (1): 1983

=== Other competitions ===
- Trofeo Cinelandia

Winners (1): 2011

== Top performances in European and worldwide competitions ==
Season	Achievement	Notes
EuroLeague
1968–69	Quarter-finals	3rd place in a group with Spartak ZJŠ Brno, Standard Liège and Maccabi Tel Aviv
1975–76	Semi-finals	eliminated by Mobilgirgi Varese, 85–95 (L) in Varese, 70–78 (L) in Cantù
1981–82	Champions	defeated Maccabi Tel Aviv, 86–80 in the final of European Champions Cup in Cologne
1982–83	Champions	defeated Billy Milano, 69–68 in the final of European Champions Cup in Grenoble
1983–84	Semi-final group stage	3rd place in a group with FC Barcelona, Banco di Roma Virtus, Bosna, Maccabi Tel Aviv and Limoges CSP
FIBA Saporta Cup
1976–77	Champions	defeated Radnički Belgrade, 87–86 in the final of European Cup Winners' Cup in Palma de Mallorca
1977–78	Champions	defeated Sinudyne Bologna, 84–82 in the final of European Cup Winners' Cup in Milan
1978–79	Champions	defeated EBBC, 83–73 in the final of European Cup Winners' Cup in Poreč
1979–80	Final	lost to Emerson Varese, 88–90 in the final (Milan)
1980–81	Champions	defeated FC Barcelona, 86–82 in the final of European Cup Winners' Cup in Rome
FIBA Korać Cup
1973	Champions	defeated Maes Pils, 106–85 (W) in Cantù, 85–94 (L) in Mechelen in the double finals of FIBA Korać Cup
1973–74	Champions	defeated Partizan, 99–86 (W) in Cantù, 75–68 (W) in Belgrade in the double finals of Korać Cup
1974–75	Champions	defeated FC Barcelona, 71–69 (W) in Barcelona, 110–85 (W) in Cucciago in the double finals of Korać Cup
1988–89	Final	lost to Partizan, 89–76 (W) in Cucciago, 82–101 (L) in Belgrade
1990–91	Champions	defeated Real Madrid, 73–71 (W) in Madrid, 95–93 (W) in Cucciago
1991–92	Semi-finals	eliminated by Scavolini Pesaro, 76–74 (W) in Cucciago, 86–89 (L) in Pesaro
1992–93	Semi-finals	eliminated by Philips Milano, 74–72 (W) in Cucciago, 72–85 (L) in Milan
FIBA Intercontinental Cup
1975	Champions	Intercontinental Cup Champions with a 4–1 record in a league tournament in Cantù
1982	Champions	Intercontinental Cup Champions with a 5–0 record in a league tournament in Den Bosch
1983	Runners-up	Runner-up with a 3–2 record in a league tournament in Buenos Aires

== Notable players ==
Note: Flags indicate national team eligibility at FIBA-sanctioned events. Players may hold other non-FIBA nationalities not displayed.

Criteria

To appear in this section a player must have either:

- Set a club record or won an individual award while at the club
- Played at least one official international match for their national team at any time
- Played at least one official NBA match at any time.

2010s

- (Lithuania) Vaidas Kariniauskas 1 season: '16–'17
- (United States) Metta World Peace 1/2 season: '15
- (United States) (Dominican Republic) James Feldeine 1 season: '14–'15
- (United States) Darius Johnson-Odom 1 season: '14–'15
- (Italy) Pietro Aradori 2 seasons: '12–'14
- (United States) (Israel) Alex Tyus 1 season: '12–'13
- (United States) Doron Perkins 1/2 season: '12
- (Georgia (country)) Giorgi Shermadini 2 season: '11–'12, '14-'15
- (Italy) Gianluca Basile 1 season: '11–'12
- (Italy) Denis Marconato 2 1/2 seasons: '10–'12, '14
- (Serbia) Vladimir Micov 2 1/2 seasons: '10–'12

2000s

- (United States) Maarty Leunen 5 seasons: '09–'14
- (Georgia (country)) Manuchar Markoishvili 3 1/2 seasons: '09–'13
- (Uruguay) (Italy) Nicolás Mazzarino 8 seasons: '05–'13
- (Lithuania) Rimantas Kaukėnas 1 season: '04–'05
- (Lithuania) Povilas Čukinas 1 season: '07–'08
- (Lithuania) Arminas Urbutis 2 season: '09–'11
- (United States) (Italy) Dante Calabria 1 season: '03–'04
- (United States) Nate Johnson 1 season: '03–'04
- (Greece) Sofoklis Schortsanitis 1 season: '03–'04
- (United States) Tyson Wheeler 1 1/2 seasons: '03–'04
- (New Zealand) (United Kingdom) Phill Jones 4 seasons: '02–'03, '04-'07
- (United States) Shaun Stonerook 4 seasons: '01–'05
- (United States) Jerry McCullough 2 seasons: '01–'03
- (United States) Bootsy Thornton 3 seasons: '00–'03

1990s

- (United States) (Italy) Casey Shaw 2 seasons: '99–'00, '06–'07
- (United States) Walter Berry 1 season: '97–'98
- (United States) Brian Oliver 1 season: '97–'98
- (United States) Pete Myers 1 season: '96–'97
- (United States) Thurl Bailey 2 seasons: '95–'97
- (United States) Michael Curry 1 season: '93–'94

1980s

- (United States) Pace Mannion 4 seasons: '89–'93
- (United States) Roosevelt Bouie 2 seasons: '89–'91
- (United States) Kent Benson 1 season: '88–'89
- (United States) Jeff Turner 2 seasons: '87–'89
- (United States) (Italy) Dan Gay 9 seasons: '85–'88, '00–'05
- (United States) Richard Anderson 2 seasons: '84–'86
- (United States) Jim Brewer 3 seasons: '82–'85
- (United States) Wallace Bryant 1 season: '82–'83
- (United States) C. J. Kupec 1 season: '81–'82
- (United States) Tom Boswell 1 season: '80–'81

1970s

- (United States) Bruce Flowers 3 seasons: '79–'82
- (Italy) Renzo Bariviera 5 seasons: '78–'83
- (United States) Johnny Neumann 1 season: '78–'79
- (Italy) Antonello Riva 16 seasons: '77–'89, '98–'02
- (United States) Harthorne Wingo 2 seasons: '76–'78
- (United States) Bob Lienhard 8 seasons: '70–'78

1960s

- (Italy) Pierluigi Marzorati 23 seasons: '69–'91, '06
- (United States) Ed Siudut 1 season: '69–'70
- (Italy) Fabrizio Della Fiori 12 seasons: '67–'79
- (Argentina) (Italy) Carlos D'Aquila 4 seasons: '65–'69
- (Argentina) (Italy) Alberto De Simone 7 seasons: '64–'71
- (Brazil) (Italy) Enrico De Carli 2 seasons: '63–'65
- (Italy) Carlo Recalcati 17 seasons: '62–'79

1950s

- (Italy) Giancarlo Sarti 8 seasons: '59–'67
- (Italy) Antonio Frigerio 11 seasons: '58–'69
- (Italy) Dante Angelo Masocco 8 seasons: '57–'63, '69-'71
- (United States) Tony Vlastelica 2 season: '57–'59
- (Socialist Federal Republic of Yugoslavia) Borislav Ćurčić 2 seasons: '55–'57
- (Italy) Sergio Marelli 1 season: '55–'56
- (Italy) Lino Cappelletti 13 seasons: '50–'63

== Head coaches ==
- (United States) James Strong – 1 season: '54–'55
- (Socialist Federal Republic of Yugoslavia) Isidoro Maršan – 2 seasons: '56–'58
- (Italy) Gianni Corsolini – 2 seasons: '58–'60
- (Italy) Vittorio Tracuzzi – 2 seasons: '60–'62
- (Italy) Gianni Corsolini – 3 seasons: '62–'65
- (Italy) Arnaldo Taurisano – 1 season: '65–'66
- (Socialist Federal Republic of Yugoslavia) Borislav Stanković – 2 seasons: '66–'69
- (Italy) Arnaldo Taurisano – 10 seasons: '69–'79
- (Italy) Valerio Bianchini – 3 seasons: '79–'82
- (Italy) Giancarlo Primo – 1 season: '82–'83
- (Italy) Gianni Asti – 1 season: '83–'84
- (Italy) Carlo Recalcati – 6 seasons: '84–'90
- (Italy) Fabrizio Frates – 2 seasons: '90–'92
- (Spain) Antonio Díaz-Miguel – 6 games: '93
- (Italy) Bruno Arrigoni – 1/2 season: '93–'94
- (Italy) Giancarlo Sacco – 1 1/2 seasons: '94–'95
- (Italy) Bruno Arrigoni – 1 game: '95
- (Italy) Gianfranco Lombardi – 1 1/2 seasons: '95–'97
- (Italy) Virginio Bernardi – 6 games: '97
- (Italy) Massimo Magri – 1/2 season: '97–'98
- (Italy) Fabrizio Frates – 1 season: '98–'99
- (Italy) Franco Ciani – 1/2 season: '99–'00
- (Italy) Stefano Sacripanti – 6 1/2 seasons: '00–'07
- (Italy) Luca Dalmonte – 2 seasons: '07–'09
- (Italy) Andrea Trinchieri – 4 seasons: '09–'13
- (Italy) Stefano Sacripanti – 2 seasons: '13–'15
- (Italy) Fabio Corbani – 1/2 season: '15
- (Russia) Sergei Bazarevich – 1/2 season: '15–'16
- (Lithuania) Rimas Kurtinaitis – 1/2 season: '16
- (Italy) Carlo Recalcati – 1/2 season: '16–'17
- (Ukraine) Kyrylo Bol'shakov – 1/2 season: '17
- (Italy) Marco Sodini – 1/2 season: '17–'18
- (Russia) Evgeniy Pashutin – 1 season: '18–'19
- (Italy) Nicola Brienza – 1/2 season: '19
- (Italy) Cesare Pancotto – 1 1/2 seasons: '19–21
- (Italy) Piero Bucchi – 1/2 season: '20–21
- (Italy) Marco Sodini – 1 season: '21–'22
- (Italy) Romeo Sacchetti – 1 season: '22–'23
- (Italy) Devis Cagnardi – 1 season: '23–'24
- (Italy) Nicola Brienza – 1 1/2 seasons: '24–present

== Sponsorship names ==
Throughout the years, due to sponsorship deals, the club has also been known as:

- Milenka Cantù (1954–55)
- Oransoda Cantù (1956–58)
- Fonte Levissima Cantù (1958–65)
- Oransoda Cantù (1965–69)
- Pallacanestro Cantù (1969–70)
- Birra Forst Cantù (1970–77)
- Gabetti Cantù (1977–80)
- Squibb Cantù (1980–82)
- Ford Cantù (1982–83)
- Jollycolombani Cantù (1983–85)
- Arexons Cantù (1985–88)
- Wiwa Vismara Cantù (1988–90)
- Shampoo Clear Cantù (1990–94)
- Polti Cantù (1994–99)
- Canturina Cantù (1999–2000)
- Poliform Cantù (2000–01)
- Oregon Scientific Cantù (2001–04)
- Vertical Vision Cantù (2004–06)
- Tisettanta Cantù (2006–08)
- NGC Cantù (2008–09)
- NGC Medical Cantù (2009–10)
- Bennet Cantù (2010–12)
- Chebolletta Cantù [Domestically] (2012)

- Mapooro Cantù [European competitions] (2012)

- Lenovo Cantù [Domestically] (2013)
- Acqua Vitasnella Cantù [Domestically] (2013–2016)
- Red October Cantù [Domestically] (2016–2019)

- FoxTown Cantù [European competitions] (2013–2018)

- Acqua S.Bernardo Cantù (2019)
- S.Bernardo-Cinelandia Cantù (2019–2022)
- Acqua S.Bernardo Cantù (2022–present)
