= BBC Diekirch =

Diekirch
- Nickname: Chargers
- Leagues: LBBL
- Founded: 1955; 70 years ago 1990; 35 years ago
- Dissolved: 1982; 43 years ago
- Arena: Sports Hall rue Joseph Merten
- Location: Diekirch, Luxembourg
- President: Rui Brito
- Head coach: Logelin Serge, Rui Brito
- Championships: 2 Luxembourgian Champions
- Website: BbcDiekirch.lu
Home	Away

Basketball Club Diekirch, better known as BBC Diekirch, is a Luxembourg basketball club from Diekirch.

== History ==
=== The beginnings ===
Although in Diekirch a group of students played before the Second World War regularly basketball, it took until 1955 before the Basketball Club Diekirch, who also then heard the acronym BBCD, the first Basketball Association was founded in the city. After the team was allowed to start in the second division, already managed to carve out two years after the association was founded in the highest league of Luxembourg, today Total League.

=== Establishment in the 1.League ===
In the 60s Diekirch played there ever a good role, was several times third, reaching three times the cup final at the Luxembourg Cup, which went each lost. A championship win never managed the team, which was mainly due to the triumphant basketball players from Etzella Ettelbruck that dominated the league in the 60s.

=== Transfers, merger and dissolution ===
The club officials targeted the late 60s for higher things, committing the first time foreign players, including mainly Americans, who were stationed at nearby Bitburg. Thus Diekirch was the first Luxembourg club that exported such transfers. The hoped-for gains title remained but in spite of these investments, so that the BBCD early 70s with the CS Standard, one founded a few years earlier athletics club from Diekirch, united and took its name CS Standard Diekirch (Circle Sportif Standard Diekirch), or commonly Standard Diekirch. Shortly after the merger, the team participated in the European competition 1974–75 FIBA Korać Cup in part, where there was a chance in the first round against the German 1.FC Bamberg and both games (56:82 and 66:78) lost.

The association was dissolved in 1982 because of financial problems.

=== Re-establishment ===
In 1990, eight years after the dissolution, the club was refounded and started the restart in the fifth division. To return to the upper house, it should still not rich, but at least the club has re-established itself in the third division.

The home matches will be held in the Sports Hall rue Joseph Merten.
