= Gary Phaeton =

French basketball player (born 1985)

Gary Phaeton (born 16 February 1985, in Paris) is a French basketball player who played for French Pro A League club Nancy during the 2003–2004 season.
