= George Fisher (basketball player) =

American professional basketball coach and former professional player

Personal information
- Born: Alhambra, California
- Listed height: 6 ft 7 in (2.01 m)
- Listed weight: 215 lb (98 kg)

Career information
- High school: Alhambra (Alhambra, California)
- College: Utah (1963–1966)
- NBA draft: 1966: 6th round, 51st overall pick
- Drafted by: New York Knicks
- Position: Forward

Career history

Coaching
- 1979–1989: Élan Béarnais Orthez
- 1989–1990: Racing Paris Basket
- 1991–1992: Aris
- Stats at Basketball Reference

George Fisher is an American professional basketball coach and former professional player.

== Career ==
Fisher, a 6’7’’ (2.00 m) forward, played basketball and baseball at Alhambra High School in Alhambra, California. Serving as captain of the Alhambra basketball team, he was a First Team All Pacific League and an All Temple City Tournament selection in 1962. Fisher attended the University of Utah, playing for the Utes from 1963 to 1966. He saw action in a total of 79 games, averaging 14.4 points per contest. His best season at the college level came in 1964–65, when he tallied 17.8 points a game. In the 1963–64 season, he led the Utes in rebounding with 8.7 boards per game. Fisher earned a bachelor's degree in marketing and management.

Despite having suffered a broken femur during the 1965–66 campaign, he was selected by the New York Knicks in the 1966 NBA draft (sixth round, 51st overall). However, Fisher never played in the NBA. After the end of his college career, he coached the freshman team at the University of Utah, while recovering from his leg injury. Later, Fisher went to Milan, Italy, to play professionally and then moved to France, where he played and coached at Jœuf Homécourt Basket for eight years.

From 1979 to 1989, Fisher served as head coach of Élan béarnais Orthez in France. Under his guidance, Orthez won the Korać Cup in 1984. Fisher also won two French national championships with Orthez (1986 and 1987). In 1987, he guided the team to a third-place finish in the final stage of the FIBA European Champions Cup. Over the years, his Orthez team included players like John McCullough, Paul Henderson, Howard Carter and Tom Scheffler. Fisher left Orthez in 1989. He had offers from Greece, Maccabi Tel Aviv and Real Madrid on the table, but took over the head coaching position at PSG Racing in Paris, France. He parted ways with the club during the 1989–1990 season. During his time in France, Fisher worked for the Banque Nationale de Paris as a consultant to Real Estate Asset Acquisition Managers in off-seasons. From 1991 to 1992, Fisher served as head coach of Aris Thessaloniki in Greece, where his team included players like Nikos Galis, Panagiotis Giannakis and Walter Berry.

Fisher moved back to California, he settled in Shell Beach and worked as a realtor. His former teammate at Utah, Bucky Buckwalter, later revealed, that Fisher made him aware of Arvydas Sabonis in the 1980s and also gave his insight on Dražen Petrović, when Buckwalter started considering foreign players as potential recruits for the Portland Trail Blazers who eventually drafted Sabonis in 1986.
