= Luciano Vendemini =

Italian basketball player (1952–1977)

Personal information
- Born: 11 July 1952 Rimini, Italy
- Died: 20 February 1977 (aged 24) Forlì, Italy
- Height: 2.12 m (6 ft 11 in)
- Weight: 107 kg (236 lb)

Sport
- Sport: Basketball
- Club: AMG Sebastiani Rieti

Luciano Vendemini (11 July 1952 – 20 February 1977) was an Italian basketball player. He was a member of the Italian team that finished fifth at the 1976 Summer Olympics. He unexpectedly died of heart failure while sitting on a bench during a basketball match.
