= Frédéric Adjiwanou =

French basketball player (born 1980)

Free agent
- Position: Center

Personal information
- Born: 17 July 1980 (age 46) Annemasse, France
- Listed height: 6 ft 8.5 in (2.04 m)
- Listed weight: 228.8 lb (104 kg)

Career information
- College: Foothill CC (2001–2002); Saint Mary's (2002–2005)
- NBA draft: 2005: undrafted
- Playing career: 1998–present

Career history
- 1998–2000: Limoges CSP
- 2005–2006: Reims Champagne
- 2006–2007: Le Mans Sarthe
- 2007–2009: Orléans Loiret
- 2009–2010: JDA Dijon
- 2009–2010: Olympique Antibes
- 2010–2012: Boulazac Dordogne
- 2013–2014: Aix Maurienne Savoie
- 2014–2015: Boulazac Dordogne
- 2015–2016: JSA Bordeaux

Frédéric Adjiwanou (born 17 July 1980) is a French professional basketball player who played for French Pro A league clubs in Reims, Le Mans, Orleans and Dijon between 2005 and 2010. He last played for JSA Bordeaux of the LNB Pro B.
