= USC München (basketball) =

USC München (Universitäts-Sportclub München) was a professional basketball club based in Munich, West Germany.

== History ==
The club was part (a.k.a. basketball section) of the multi-sport club of USC München e.V. which was founded in 1962. In 1967–68 season, USC München participated in the second edition of Basketball Bundesliga (BBL) for the first time in the history of the club and remained stable for eight consecutive seasons until 1974–75. In the 1970–71 season USC München reached to play with seat advantage in the play-off finals against TuS 04 Leverkusen but lost the series to 1–2 wins. As runners-up of the BBL, USC München participated in the 1972 FIBA Korać Cup, first edition of this newfound competition and eliminated in the quarterfinals by then runners-up of OKK Beograd (two loses 61–63 in Munich and 79–97 in Belgrade). The 1974–75 season, the club played again in the FIBA Korać Cup but eliminated in the first round by the Italians of Brina Rieti. At the end of the season USC München merged with TSV 1860 München to create a new professional basketball club, München Basket.

== Honours ==
- Basketball Bundesliga

Runners-up: 1971
