= 1973 FIBA Korać Cup =

- League: FIBA Korać Cup
- Sport: Basketball

Finals
- Champions: (Italy) Birra Forst Cantù
- Runners-up: (Belgium) Maes Pils

FIBA Korać Cup seasons
- ← 1972 1973–74 →

The 1973 FIBA Korać Cup was the second edition of FIBA's competition, running from 9 January to 27 March 1973. It was contested by 12 teams, four more than in the previous edition.

Birra Forst Cantù defeated Maes Pils in the final to become the competition's first Italian champion.

== Season teams ==
Country	Teams	Clubs (ranking in 1971–72 national league)	
Belgium	2	Maes Pils	Standard Liège
France	2	Berck	Denain Voltaire
Spain	2	CF Barcelona	Filomatic Picadero
(Socialist Federal Republic of Yugoslavia) Yugoslavia	2	Lokomotiva	Rabotnički
Greece	1	YMCA Thessaloniki	
Italy	1	Birra Forst Cantù	
Luxembourg	1	Amicale	
West Germany	1	Wolfenbüttel	

== Round of 12 ==
The round of 12 were played with a round-robin system, in which every Two Game series (TGS) constituted as one game for the record.

Key to colors
Top place in each group advance to semifinals

=== Group A ===
	1st leg	2nd leg	Agg.
(Greece) YMCA Thessaloniki – (Belgium) Maes Pils	73–76	71–96	144–172
(Socialist Federal Republic of Yugoslavia) Lokomotiva – (Greece) YMCA Thessaloniki	81–61	73–68	154–129
(Belgium) Maes Pils – (Socialist Federal Republic of Yugoslavia) Lokomotiva	115–92	82–87	197–179

	Team	Pld	Pts	W	L	PF	PA	PD
1.	(Belgium) Maes Pils	2	4	2	0	369	323	+46
2.	(Socialist Federal Republic of Yugoslavia) Lokomotiva	2	3	1	1	333	326	+7
3.	(Greece) YMCA Thessaloniki	2	2	0	2	273	326	−53

=== Group B ===
	1st leg	2nd leg	Agg.
(Spain) CF Barcelona – (Luxembourg) Amicale	87–61	cancelled	87–61
(Luxembourg) Amicale – (France) Denain Voltaire	62–69	66–87	128–156
(France) Denain Voltaire – (Spain) CF Barcelona	73–61	67–81	140–142

	Team	Pld	Pts	W	L	PF	PA	PD
1.	(Spain) CF Barcelona	2	4	2	0	229	198	+31
2.	(France) Denain Voltaire	2	3	1	1	293	270	+23
3.	(Luxembourg) Amicale	2	2	0	2	189	243	−54

=== Group C ===
	1st leg	2nd leg	Agg.
(France) Berck – (Italy) Birra Forst Cantù	85–75	67–78	152–153
(Belgium) Standard Liège – (France) Berck	87–90	75–100	162–190
(Italy) Birra Forst Cantù – (Belgium) Standard Liège	90–56	106–93	196–149

	Team	Pld	Pts	W	L	PF	PA	PD
1.	(Italy) Birra Forst Cantù	2	4	2	0	349	301	+48
2.	(France) Berck	2	3	1	1	342	315	+27
3.	(Belgium) Standard Liège	2	2	0	2	311	386	−75

=== Group D ===
	1st leg	2nd leg	Agg.
(West Germany) Wolfenbüttel – (Spain) Filomatic Picadero	60–58	52–71	112–129

	Team	Pld	Pts	W	L	PF	PA	PD
1.	(Spain) Filomatic Picadero	2	4	1	1	129	112	+17
2.	(West Germany) Wolfenbüttel	2	2	1	1	112	129	−17
3.	(Socialist Federal Republic of Yugoslavia) Rabotnički*	0	0	0	0	0	0	0

*Rabotnički originally drawn this group, withdrew before the competition.

== Semi finals ==
Team 1	Agg.	Team 2	1st leg	2nd leg
Maes Pils (Belgium)	177–169	(Spain) CF Barcelona	99–87	78–82
Filomatic Picadero (Spain)	163–194	(Italy) Birra Forst Cantù	81–82	82–112

== Finals ==
Team 1	Agg.	Team 2	1st leg	2nd leg
Birra Forst Cantù (Italy)	191–169	(Belgium) Maes Pils	106–75	85–94

1973 FIBA Korać Cup Champions

Birra Forst Cantù
1st title
