= 1973–74 FIBA Korać Cup =

- League: FIBA Korać Cup
- Sport: Basketball

Finals
- Champions: (Italy) Birra Forst Cantù
- Runners-up: (Socialist Federal Republic of Yugoslavia) Partizan

FIBA Korać Cup seasons
- ← 1973 1974–75 →

The 1973–74 FIBA Korać Cup was the third edition of FIBA's new competition, running from 6 November 1973 to 11 April 1974. It was contested by 37 teams, twenty-five more than in the previous edition.

Birra Forst Cantù defeated Partizan in the final to become the competition's first back-to-back champion.

== Season teams ==
Country	Teams	Clubs (ranking in 1972–73 national league)			
Belgium	4	Carad	Bus Fruit Lier	Standard Liège	Maes Pils
Italy	4	Innocenti Milano	Birra Forst Cantù	Snaidero Udine	Mobilquattro Milano
(Socialist Federal Republic of Yugoslavia) Yugoslavia	4	Partizan	Borac Čačak	AŠK Olimpija	Jugoplastika
France	3	Olympique Antibes	ASVEL	Denain Voltaire	
Spain	3	Juventud Schweppes	CF Barcelona	Kas Vitoria	
West Germany	3	1.FC Bamberg	TuS 04 Leverkusen	Wolfenbüttel	
Austria	2	Union Garant Ehgartner	Soma Wien		
Greece	2	AEK	YMCA Thessaloniki		
Israel	2	Hapoel Tel Aviv	Maccabi Ramat Gan		
Luxembourg	2	T71 Dudelange	Etzella		
Netherlands	2	Raak Punch	EBBC		
Portugal	2	Coimbra	Porto		
Switzerland	2	Federale	Union Neuchâtel		
Bulgaria	1	Balkan Botevgrad			
England	1	Sutton & Crystal Palace			

== First round ==
Team 1	Agg.	Team 2	1st leg	2nd leg
Union Neuchâtel (Switzerland)	212–257	(Socialist Federal Republic of Yugoslavia) AŠK Olimpija	114–127	98–130
Etzella (Luxembourg)	145–228	(Belgium) Maes Pils	83–127	62–101
Coimbra (Portugal)	164–220	(Spain) CF Barcelona	81–103	83–117
Juventud Schweppes (Spain)	213–167	(Switzerland) Federale	105–69	108–98
TuS 04 Leverkusen (West Germany)	161–165	(Italy) Snaidero Udine	89–85	72–80
Raak Punch (Netherlands)	154–150	(Belgium) Bus Fruit Lier	80–76	74–74
Hapoel Tel Aviv (Israel)	-*	(Greece) AEK		
Borac Čačak (Socialist Federal Republic of Yugoslavia)	155–176	(Italy) Innocenti Milano	79–80	76–96
1.FC Bamberg (West Germany)	-*	(Israel) Maccabi Ramat Gan		
Denain Voltaire (France)	164–175	(Socialist Federal Republic of Yugoslavia) Jugoplastika	83–81	81–94
YMCA Thessaloniki (Greece)	4–0**	(Austria) Soma Wien	2–0	2–0
Wolfenbüttel (West Germany)	173–186	(Spain) Kas Vitoria	90–80	83–106
Sutton & Crystal Palace (England)	165–175	(Belgium) Carad	89–78	76–97
EBBC (Netherlands)	171–193	(France) ASVEL	85–101	86–92

*Originally, AEK and 1.FC Bamberg were drawn to play against the Israeli teams Hapoel Tel Aviv and Maccabi Ramat Gan, respectively, but FIBA cancelled these match-ups and declared the former clubs winners.

**Soma Wien withdrew before the first leg and HAN Thessaloniki received a forfeit (2–0) in both games.

== Second round ==
Team 1	Agg.	Team 2	1st leg	2nd leg
AŠK Olimpija (Socialist Federal Republic of Yugoslavia)	191–181	(Belgium) Maes Pils	90–85	101–96
CF Barcelona (Spain)	196–119	(Luxembourg) T71 Dudelange	110–55	86–64
Porto (Portugal)	109–190	(Spain) Juventud Schweppes	61–83	48–107
Snaidero Udine (Italy)	161–147	(Netherlands) Raak Punch	87–71	74–76
Standard Liège (Belgium)	167–168	(Greece) AEK	94–76	73–92
Innocenti Milano (Italy)	161–139	(Austria) Union Garant Ehgartner	86–76	75–63
1.FC Bamberg (West Germany)	147–182	(Italy) Mobilquattro Milano	58–79	89–103
Balkan Botevgrad (Bulgaria)	164–166	(Socialist Federal Republic of Yugoslavia) Jugoplastika	91–62	73–104
YMCA Thessaloniki (Greece)	140–167	(Socialist Federal Republic of Yugoslavia) Partizan	77–79	63–88
Kas Vitoria (Spain)	190–195	(France) Olympique Antibes	109–103	81–92
Carad (Belgium)	146–170	(France) ASVEL	72–86	74–84

Automatically qualified to round of 12

- (Italy) Birra Forst Cantù (title holder)

== Round of 12 ==
The round of 12 were played with a round-robin system, in which every Two Game series (TGS) constituted as one game for the record.

Key to colors
Top place in each group advance to semifinals

=== Group A ===
	Team	Pld	Pts	W	L	PF	PA	PD
1.	(Italy) Birra Forst Cantù	2	4	2	0	393	363	+30
2.	(Spain) CF Barcelona	2	3	1	1	381	381	0
3.	(France) Olympique Antibes	2	2	0	2	352	382	−30

=== Group B ===
	Team	Pld	Pts	W	L	PF	PA	PD
1.	(Socialist Federal Republic of Yugoslavia) Jugoplastika	2	4	2	0	374	354	+20
2.	(Italy) Snaidero Udine	2	3	1	1	326	301	+25
3.	(Greece) AEK	2	2	0	2	312	357	−45

=== Group C ===
	Team	Pld	Pts	W	L	PF	PA	PD
1.	(France) ASVEL	2	3	1	1	300	291	+9
2.	(Socialist Federal Republic of Yugoslavia) AŠK Olimpija	2	3	1	1	329	332	−3
3.	(Italy) Innocenti Milano	2	3	1	1	293	299	−6

=== Group D ===
	Team	Pld	Pts	W	L	PF	PA	PD
1.	(Socialist Federal Republic of Yugoslavia) Partizan	2	4	2	0	331	311	+20
2.	(Spain) Juventud Schweppes	2	3	1	1	315	303	+12
3.	(Italy) Mobilquattro Milano	2	2	0	2	287	319	−32

== Semi finals ==
Team 1	Agg.	Team 2	1st leg	2nd leg
Birra Forst Cantù (Italy)	175–162	(France) ASVEL	99–68	76–94
Partizan (Socialist Federal Republic of Yugoslavia)	183–182	(Socialist Federal Republic of Yugoslavia) Jugoplastika	108–97	75–85

== Finals ==
Team 1	Agg.	Team 2	1st leg	2nd leg
Birra Forst Cantù (Italy)	174–154	(Socialist Federal Republic of Yugoslavia) Partizan	99–86	75–68

1973–74 FIBA Korać Cup Champions

Birra Forst Cantù
2nd title
