= 1977–78 FIBA European Cup Winners' Cup =

- League: FIBA European Cup Winners' Cup
- Sport: Basketball

Finals
- Champions: (Italy) Gabetti Cantù
- Runners-up: (Italy) Sinudyne Bologna

FIBA European Cup Winners' Cup seasons
- ← 1976–77 1978–79 →

The 1977–78 FIBA European Cup Winners' Cup was the twelfth edition of FIBA's 2nd-tier level European-wide professional club basketball competition, contested between national domestic cup champions, running from 19 October 1977, to 29 March 1978. It was contested by 22 teams, three less than in the previous edition.

Gabetti Cantù defeated Sinudyne Bologna in a final, held in Milan, winning the FIBA European Cup Winner's Cup for the second consecutive time in the club's history.

== Participants ==
Country	Teams	Clubs	
Italy	2	Sinudyne Bologna	Gabetti Cantù
Albania	1	Partizani Tirana	
Austria	1	Milde Sorte Wien	
Belgium	1	Éveil Monceau	
Bulgaria	1	Levski-Spartak	
Czechoslovakia	1	Slavia VŠ Praha	
England	1	Embassy Milton Keynes	
France	1	Caen	
Greece	1	Olympiacos	
Hungary	1	Soproni MAFC	
Israel	1	Hapoel Tel Aviv	
Luxembourg	1	Sparta Bertrange	
Netherlands	1	Falcon Jeans EBBC	
Poland	1	Wisła Kraków	
Romania	1	Steaua București	
Spain	1	FC Barcelona	
Sweden	1	Södertälje	
Switzerland	1	Viganello	
Turkey	1	Beşiktaş	
West Germany	1	Gießen 46ers	
(Socialist Federal Republic of Yugoslavia) Yugoslavia	1	Kvarner	

== First round ==
Team 1	Agg.	Team 2	1st leg	2nd leg
Soproni MAFC (Hungary)	195–179	(Austria) Milde Sorte Wien	98–94	97–85
Hapoel Tel Aviv (Israel)	134–135	(Greece) Olympiacos	79–60	55–75
Beşiktaş (Turkey)	165–200	(Bulgaria) Levski-Spartak	101–111	64–89
Sparta Bertrange (Luxembourg)	153–171	(Switzerland) Viganello	70–79	83–92
Embassy Milton Keynes (England)	183–205	(Spain) FC Barcelona	88–88	95–117
Gießen 46ers (West Germany)	189–216	(Netherlands) Falcon Jeans EBBC	97–109	92–107
Södertälje (Sweden)	188–178	(Belgium) Éveil Monceau	100–84	88–94

== Second round ==
Team 1	Agg.	Team 2	1st leg	2nd leg
Partizani Tirana (Albania)	165–192	(France) Caen	91–97	74–95
Soproni MAFC (Hungary)	172–181	(Socialist Federal Republic of Yugoslavia) Kvarner	94–93	78–88
Olympiacos (Greece)	139–150	(Italy) Sinudyne Bologna	78–72	61–78
Levski-Spartak (Bulgaria)	158–181	(Romania) Steaua București	83–74	75–107
Viganello (Switzerland)	166–219	(Spain) FC Barcelona	82–93	84–126
Falcon Jeans EBBC (Netherlands)	176–156	(Czechoslovakia) Slavia VŠ Praha	98–73	78–83
Södertälje (Sweden)	168–161	(Poland) Wisła Kraków	88–92	80–69

Automatically qualified to the Quarter finals group stage

- (Italy) Gabetti Cantù (title holder)

== Quarterfinals ==
Key to colors
Top two places in each group advance to semifinals

=== Group A ===
	(Italy) CAN	(France) CAE	(Netherlands) EBBC	(Socialist Federal Republic of Yugoslavia) KVA
(Italy) CAN	*	89-82	87-75	92-67
(France) CAE	101-91	*	98-87	92-79
(Netherlands) EBBC	87-89	89-91	*	99-85
(Socialist Federal Republic of Yugoslavia) KVA	74-81	100-93	65-78	*

	Team	Pld	Pts	W	L	PF	PA	PD
1.	(Italy) Gabetti Cantù	6	11	5	1	529	486	+43
2.	(France) Caen	6	10	4	2	557	535	+22
3.	(Netherlands) Falcon Jeans EBBC	6	8	2	4	515	515	0
4.	(Socialist Federal Republic of Yugoslavia) Kvarner	6	7	1	5	470	535	-65

=== Group B ===
	(Italy) SIN	(Spain) FCB	(Romania) STE	(Sweden) SÖD
(Italy) SIN	*	89-72	99-76	92-90
(Spain) FCB	94-86	*	124-86	98-73
(Romania) STE	110-101	101-100	*	95-84
(Sweden) SÖD	73-83	90-77	83-82	*

	Team	Pld	Pts	W	L	PF	PA	PD
1.	(Italy) Sinudyne Bologna	6	10	4	2	550	515	+35
2.	(Spain) FC Barcelona	6	9	3	3	565	525	+40
3.	(Romania) Steaua București	6	9	3	3	550	591	-41
4.	(Sweden) Södertälje	6	8	2	4	493	527	-34

== Semifinals ==
Team 1	Agg.	Team 2	1st leg	2nd leg
Sinudyne Bologna (Italy)	178–164	(France) Caen	98–78	80–86
FC Barcelona (Spain)	167–184	(Italy) Gabetti Cantù	90–87	77–97

== Final ==
March 29, PalaLido, Milan

Team 1	Score	Team 2
Gabetti Cantù (Italy)	84–82	(Italy) Sinudyne Bologna

1977–78 FIBA European Cup Winners' Cup Champions

Gabetti Cantù
2nd title
