= 1978–79 FIBA European Cup Winners' Cup =

- League: FIBA European Cup Winners' Cup
- Sport: Basketball

Finals
- Champions: (Italy) Gabetti Cantù
- Runners-up: (Netherlands) EBBC

FIBA European Cup Winners' Cup seasons
- ← 1977–78 1979–80 →

The 1978–79 FIBA European Cup Winners' Cup was the thirteenth edition of FIBA's 2nd-tier level European-wide professional club basketball competition, contested between national domestic cup champions, running from 1 November 1978, to 22 March 1979. It was contested by 20 teams, two less than in the previous edition.

Gabetti Cantù defeated the Dutch League club, Den Bosch, in a final held in Poreč, winning the FIBA European Cup Winner's Cup for the third consecutive time.

== Participants ==
Country	Teams	Clubs	
Italy	2	Sinudyne Bologna	Gabetti Cantù
Austria	1	UBSC Wien	
Belgium	1	Avanti Brugge	
Czechoslovakia	1	Dukla Olomouc	
Denmark	1	BMS	
England	1	Team Fiat Stars	
Finland	1	Playhonka	
France	1	ASVEL	
Hungary	1	Vasas	
Iceland	1	ÍS	
Israel	1	Hapoel Tel Aviv	
Luxembourg	1	Etzella	
Netherlands	1	EBBC	
Poland	1	Śląsk Wrocław	
Portugal	1	Sangalhos	
Spain	1	FC Barcelona	
Sweden	1	Helsingborg	
Turkey	1	Tofaş	
(Socialist Federal Republic of Yugoslavia) Yugoslavia	1	Radnički Belgrade	

== First round ==
Team 1	Agg.	Team 2	1st leg	2nd leg
EBBC (Netherlands)	169–148	(Israel) Hapoel Tel Aviv	83–67	86–81
Avanti Brugge (Belgium)	208–127	(Luxembourg) Etzella	110–61	98–66
Radnički Belgrade (Socialist Federal Republic of Yugoslavia)	207–176	(Turkey) Tofaş	114–79	93–97
Dukla Olomouc (Czechoslovakia)	146–140	(Hungary) Vasas	67–57	79–83
Helsingborg (Sweden)	187–142	(Denmark) BMS	106–66	81–76
Playhonka (Finland)	176–187	(Poland) Śląsk Wrocław	98–87	78–100
Sangalhos (Portugal)	123–235	(Austria) UBSC Wien	72–97	51–138

== Second round ==
Team 1	Agg.	Team 2	1st leg	2nd leg
EBBC (Netherlands)	179–152	(Belgium) Avanti Brugge	106–67	73–85
Radnički Belgrade (Socialist Federal Republic of Yugoslavia)	208–168	(Czechoslovakia) Dukla Olomouc	111–83	97–85
Helsingborg (Sweden)	147–183	(Poland) Śląsk Wrocław	64–82	83–101
UBSC Wien (Austria)	203–159	(England) Team Fiat Stars	115–77	88–82
ÍS (Iceland)	158–249	(Spain) FC Barcelona	79–125	79–124

Automatically qualified to the quarter-finals

- (Italy) Gabetti Cantù (title holder)
- (Italy) Sinudyne Bologna
- (France) ASVEL

== Quarterfinals ==
Key to colors
Top two places in each group advance to semifinals

=== Group A ===
	(Spain) FCB	(Italy) SIN	(Socialist Federal Republic of Yugoslavia) RAD	(Austria) UBSC
(Spain) FCB		95-81	102-95	106-82
(Italy) SIN	86-73		94-81	89-68
(Socialist Federal Republic of Yugoslavia) RAD	92-99	96-95		74-71
(Austria) UBSC	84-91	86-94	82-88	

	Team	Pld	Pts	W	L	PF	PA	PD
1.	(Spain) FC Barcelona	6	11	5	1	566	520	+46
2.	(Italy) Sinudyne Bologna	6	10	4	2	539	499	+40
3.	(Socialist Federal Republic of Yugoslavia) Radnički Belgrade	6	9	3	3	526	543	-17
4.	(Austria) UBSC Wien	6	6	0	6	473	542	-69

=== Group B ===
	(Netherlands) EBBC	(Italy) CAN	(France) ASV	(Poland) SLA
(Netherlands) EBBC		95-90	94-74	111-87
(Italy) CAN	91-75		90-81	80-70
(France) ASV	68-73	116-89		102-84
(Poland) SLA	72-88	81-108	86-96	

	Team	Pld	Pts	W	L	PF	PA	PD
1.	(Netherlands) EBBC	6	11	5	1	536	482	+54
2.	(Italy) Gabetti Cantù	6	10	4	2	548	518	+30
3.	(France) ASVEL	6	9	3	3	537	516	+21
4.	(Poland) Śląsk Wrocław	6	6	0	6	480	585	-105

== Semifinals ==
Team 1	Agg.	Team 2	1st leg	2nd leg
FC Barcelona (Spain)	172–185	(Italy) Gabetti Cantù	89–84	83–101
Sinudyne Bologna (Italy)	177–178	(Netherlands) EBBC	85–73	92–105

== Final ==
March 22, SRC Veli Jože, Poreč

Team 1	Score	Team 2
Gabetti Cantù (Italy)	83–73	(Netherlands) EBBC

1978–79 FIBA European Cup Winners' Cup Champions

Gabetti Cantù
3rd title
