= Caen Basket Calvados =

- Leagues: Pro B
- Founded: 1959; 67 years ago
- History: Caen BC (1959–1982); Caen Basket Calvados (1982–present)
- Arena: Palais des Sports of Caen
- Capacity: 3,000
- Location: Caen, France
- President: Loïc Adriaenssens
- Head coach: Jean-Baptiste Lecrosnier
- Championships: 2 French League 2; 1 French League 3; 1 French League 4; 1French League 5
- Website: http://www.caenbasketcalvados.fr
| Home | Away |

Caen Basket Calvados is a French basketball team located in the commune of Caen in Northwestern France. The club competes in LNB Pro B, France's second-division men's league.

== History ==
Caen Basket Club (CBC) was founded in 1959 after the scrapping of older basketball club Stade Malherbe Caennais. This section dissolved in September 1959 and the 80% of the chamber joined the new club, mostly to keep athletes and administrative benefits. The home games are played at the Palais des Sports of Caen (3,000 seats). The beginnings of the club was promising despite performance instability. Caen BC finished third in the National Championship 1 A in 1960, before two demotions in 1964 and 1969 that were followed by two lifts in 1966 and 1970.

In the 1970s, CBC knows its heyday with a first participation in the European Cups in 1971. CBC gradually stabilizes at the highest level of French basketball. From 1976 to 1979, under the chairmanship of Guy Chambily, the club finished every season on the podium French championship, disputing including two finals (lost) against ASVEL and Moderne in 1977 and 1979. In 1978 the club even reached the Semi finals (third) of the European Cup Winner's Cup where they eliminated by the Italian powerhouse Sinudyne Bologna.

However, the late 1980s sounded the death knell for the CBC. Renamed Caen Basket Calvados in 1982, the club was relegated to the lower level at the end of the 1988–1989 season. After several failed attempts to go back in National 1A, dark CBC in 1997 with a 16th place and financial problems. The club is then downgraded to National 4.

Started from scratch, Caen Basket Calvados rebuilds and goes successively in National 3 in 1998 and National 2 in 1999. Supported since 2013 by Nicolas Batum, the club sign Hervé Coudray as coach in May 2013.

Most recently, they won the championship of the third-level Nationale Masculine 1 (NM1) in 2017, thereby gaining promotion to Pro B.

== Season by season ==
| Season | Tier | League | Pos. | French Cup |
|---|---|---|---|---|
| 2011–12 | 4 | NM2 | 6th | |
| 2012–13 | 4 | NM2 | 4th | |
| 2013–14 | 4 | NM2 | 2nd | |
| 2014–15 | 4 | NM2 | 1st | |
| 2015–16 | 3 | NM1 | 6th | Round of 64 |
| 2016–17 | 3 | NM1 | 1st | Round of 64 |

== Honours ==
Total titles: 3

=== Domestic ===
- French League
  - Runners-up (2): 1977, 1979
  - Third (3): 1960, 1976, 1978
- French League 2
  - Winners (2): 1965, 1970
- French League 3
  - Winners (1): 2017
- French League 4
  - Winners (1): 2015
- French League 5
  - Winners (1): 1999

=== European competitions ===
- FIBA Saporta Cup
  - Semi finalist, third (1): 1978

== Record in the championship of France ==
CBC has belonged for 31 seasons at the elite championship France for a record 355 wins, 18 draws and 357 defeats in 730 games. During these periods, he carried different names: Stade Malherbe Caen, Caen CBN, Caen BC and Can Horses.

== Notable players ==
- Set a club record or won an individual award as a professional player.
- Played at least one official international match for his senior national team at any time.

- (The Bahamas) Rashad Davis
- (Nigeria) Jeremiah Mordi
- (Switzerland) Nemanja Calasan
