= Standard BC Liège =

Standard Liège
- Founded: 1959
- Dissolved: 1985
- Arena: Country Hall
- Capacity: 5,600
- Location: Liège, Belgium
- Championships: 3 Belgian Championships; 3 Belgian Cups
Home	Away

Standard Basketball Club Liège was a Belgian professional basketball club that was based in Liège, Belgium. The club was also known as Standard Golden Ball Liège, for sponsorship reasons. It was the senior men's basketball department of the multi-sports club Royal Standard de Liège. The team was dissolved in 1985.

== History ==
Standard BC de Liège was founded in 1959 under registration number 1188. It was also named Standard Boule d'or, after a brand of cigarettes.

The club, without being a classical force for Belgian basketball, lived its golden era from the mid 60s, until the end of the next decade. In that time, Standard Liège won three national championships and three national cups. From 1969 to 1971, the club proved to be extremely competitive in European-wide competitions.

They reached the semifinals of the 1968–69 FIBA European Champions Cup, and were eliminated from the subsequent finalists Real Madrid. They also made the quarterfinals of the 1969–70 FIBA European Cup Winner's Cup, where they were also eliminated by the subsequent tournament finalists Jeanne d'Arc Vichy. They also made the quarterfinals of the 1970–71 FIBA European Champions Cup, playing in a fairly difficult group, which included two powerhouses of European basketball, CSKA Moscow and Real Madrid, and the most important Bulgarian team, Akademik.

The club disappeared in 1985 when it moved to Andenne (near Namur). The club formed is today known under the name "Andenne Basket" .

== Honours and achievements ==
Total titles: 7

- Belgian League (3):
  - Champions: 1967–68, 1969–70, 1976–77
- Belgian Cup (3):
  - Winners: 1962–63, 1968–69, 1976–77
- Belgian Second division (1):
  - Champions: 1963–64
- FIBA European Champions Cup:
  - Semifinals: 1968-69
  - Quarterfinals: 1970-71

== European participations ==
The club has competed for 14 seasons in European competitions organized by FIBA Europe from 1968 until 1985.

- FIBA Euroleague/Suproleague : 2 times (1968-68, 1970–71)
- Cup Winners' Cup: 1 time (1968–69)
- Korac Cup: 11 times (1971–72, 1972–73, 1973–74, 1974–75, 1975–76, 1976–77, 1978–79, 1979–80, 1980–81, 1983–84, and 1985–86 as Boule d'or Andenne)

== Notable players ==
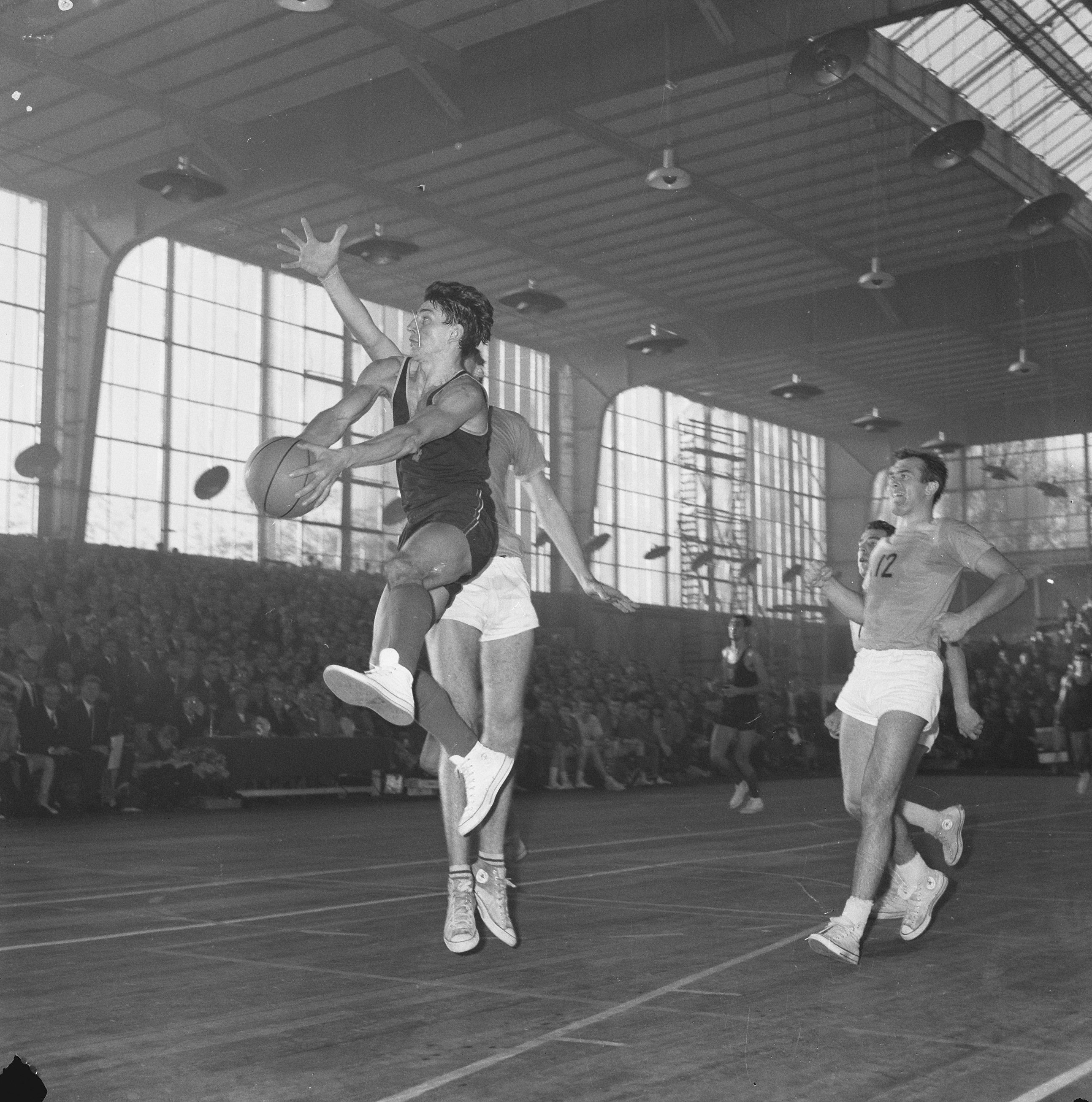
Willy Steveniers

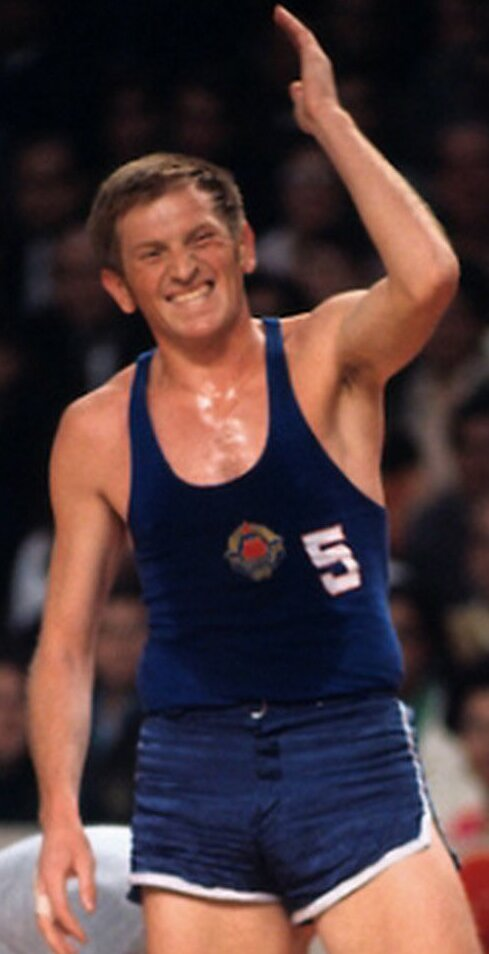
Radivoj Korac

Note: Flags indicate national team eligibility at FIBA-sanctioned events. Players may hold other non-FIBA nationalities not displayed.

Criteria

To appear in this section a player must have either:

- Set a club record or won an individual award while at the club
- Played at least one official international match for their national team at any time
- Played at least one official NBA match at any time.

Belgium :

- (Belgium) René Aerts
- (Belgium) Alain Stollenberg

Europe:

- (Socialist Federal Republic of Yugoslavia) Radivoj Korac

USA:

- (United States) Willy Steveniers

== Women's team ==
The women's section of the basketball club won the Belgian Cup six times; in 1961, 1962, 1963, 1964, 1967, and 1968.
