= Panionios B.C. in international competitions =

Panionios B.C. in international competitions is the history and statistics of Panionios B.C. in FIBA Europe and Euroleague Basketball Company competitions.

== 1970s ==
=== 1975–76 FIBA Korać Cup, 3rd–tier ===
The 1975–76 FIBA Korać Cup was the 5th installment of the European 3rd-tier level professional basketball club competition FIBA Korać Cup, running from October 28, 1975, to March 23, 1976. The trophy was won by Jugoplastika, who defeated Chinamartini Torino by a result of 179–166 in a two-legged final on a home and away basis. Overall, Panionios achieved in present competition a record of 1 win against 1 defeat, in only one round. More detailed:

==== First round ====
- Tie played on October 28, 1975, and on November 4, 1975.

Team 1	Agg.	Team 2	1st leg	2nd leg
Panionios (Greece)	163–172	(Belgium) Éveil Monceau	88–85	75–87

=== 1976–77 FIBA Korać Cup, 3rd–tier ===
The 1976–77 FIBA Korać Cup was the 6th installment of the European 3rd-tier level professional basketball club competition FIBA Korać Cup, running from October 19, 1976, to April 5, 1977. The trophy was won by Jugoplastika, who defeated Alco Bologna by a result of 87–84 at Palasport della Fiera in Genoa, Italy. Overall, Panionios achieved in present competition a record of 0 wins against 2 defeats, in two successive rounds. More detailed:

==== First round ====
- Bye

==== Second round ====
- Tie played on November 16, 1976, and on November 23, 1976.

Team 1	Agg.	Team 2	1st leg	2nd leg
Panionios (Greece)	130–185	(Italy) Alco Bologna	72–96	58–89

=== 1977–78 FIBA Korać Cup, 3rd–tier ===
The 1977–78 FIBA Korać Cup was the 7th installment of the European 3rd-tier level professional basketball club competition FIBA Korać Cup, running from November 15, 1977, to March 21, 1978. The trophy was won by Partizan, who defeated Bosna by a result of 117–110 (OT) at Sportska dvorana Borik in Banja Luka, Yugoslavia. Overall, Panionios achieved in present competition a record of 1 win against 1 defeat, in only one round. More detailed:

==== First round ====
- Tie played on November 15, 1977, and on November 22, 1977.

Team 1	Agg.	Team 2	1st leg	2nd leg
Resovia Rzeszów (Poland)	177–165	(Greece) Panionios	93–63	84–102

=== 1978–79 FIBA Korać Cup, 3rd–tier ===
The 1978–79 FIBA Korać Cup was the 8th installment of the European 3rd-tier level professional basketball club competition FIBA Korać Cup, running from October 31, 1978, to March 20, 1979. The trophy was won by Partizan, who defeated Arrigoni Rieti by a result of 108–98 at Hala Pionir in Belgrade, Yugoslavia. Overall, Panionios achieved in present competition a record of 1 win against 1 defeat, in only one round. More detailed:

==== First round ====
- Tie played on October 31, 1978, and on November 7, 1978.

Team 1	Agg.	Team 2	1st leg	2nd leg
Panionios (Greece)	185–191	(Switzerland) Pully	93–75	92–116

== 1980s ==
=== 1984–85 FIBA Korać Cup, 3rd–tier ===
The 1984–85 FIBA Korać Cup was the 14th installment of the European 3rd-tier level professional basketball club competition FIBA Korać Cup, running from October 3, 1984, to March 21, 1985. The trophy was won by Simac Milano, who defeated Ciaocrem Varese by a result of 91–78 at Palais du Midi in Brussels, Belgium. Overall, Panionios achieved in present competition a record of 2 wins against 2 defeats, in two successive rounds. More detailed:

==== First round ====
- Tie played on October 3, 1984, and on October 10, 1984.

Team 1	Agg.	Team 2	1st leg	2nd leg
Keravnos (Cyprus)	113–199	(Greece) Panionios	55–115	58–84

==== Second round ====
- Tie played on October 31, 1984, and on November 7, 1984.

Team 1	Agg.	Team 2	1st leg	2nd leg
Panionios (Greece)	142–175	(Italy) Ciaocrem Varese	67–91	75–84

=== 1985–86 FIBA Korać Cup, 3rd–tier ===
The 1985–86 FIBA Korać Cup was the 15th installment of the European 3rd-tier level professional basketball club competition FIBA Korać Cup, running from October 2, 1985, to March 27, 1986. The trophy was won by Banco di Roma Virtus, who defeated Mobilgirgi Caserta by a result of 157–150 in a two-legged final on a home and away basis. Overall, Panionios achieved in present competition a record of 2 wins against 2 defeats, in two successive rounds. More detailed:

==== First round ====
- Tie played on October 2, 1985, and on October 9, 1985.

Team 1	Agg.	Team 2	1st leg	2nd leg
Panionios (Greece)	148–128	(Belgium) Renault Gent	72–64	76-64

==== Second round ====
- Tie played on October 30, 1985, and on November 6, 1985.

Team 1	Agg.	Team 2	1st leg	2nd leg
Panionios (Greece)	151–189	(Socialist Federal Republic of Yugoslavia) Zadar	78–97	73-92

=== 1986–87 FIBA Korać Cup, 3rd–tier ===
The 1986–87 FIBA Korać Cup was the 16th installment of the European 3rd-tier level professional basketball club competition FIBA Korać Cup, running from October 1, 1986, to March 25, 1987. The trophy was won by FC Barcelona, who defeated Limoges CSP by a result of 203–171 in a two-legged final on a home and away basis. Overall, Panionios achieved in present competition a record of 2 wins against 2 defeats, in two successive rounds. More detailed:

==== First round ====
- Tie played on October 1, 1986, and on October 8, 1986.

Team 1	Agg.	Team 2	1st leg	2nd leg
AEL (Cyprus)	158–238	(Greece) Panionios	74–122	84-116

==== Second round ====
- Tie played on October 29, 1986, and on November 5, 1986.

Team 1	Agg.	Team 2	1st leg	2nd leg
Panionios (Greece)	137–169	(Italy) Berloni Torino	66–70	71-99

=== 1987–88 FIBA Korać Cup, 3rd–tier ===
The 1987–88 FIBA Korać Cup was the 17th installment of the European 3rd-tier level professional basketball club competition FIBA Korać Cup, running from September 23, 1987, to March 9, 1988. The trophy was won by Real Madrid, who defeated Cibona by a result of 195–183 in a two-legged final on a home and away basis. Overall, Panionios achieved in present competition a record of 1 win against 1 defeat, in only one round. More detailed:

==== First round ====
- Tie played on September 23, 1987, and on September 30, 1987.

Team 1	Agg.	Team 2	1st leg	2nd leg
Manchester United (England)	145–142	(Greece) Panionios	77–66	68–76

=== 1988–89 FIBA Korać Cup, 3rd–tier ===
The 1988–89 FIBA Korać Cup was the 18th installment of the European 3rd-tier level professional basketball club competition FIBA Korać Cup, running from October 12, 1988, to March 22, 1989. The trophy was won by Partizan, who defeated Wiwa Vismara Cantù by a result of 177–171 in a two-legged final on a home and away basis. Overall, Panionios achieved in present competition a record of 1 win against 1 defeat, in only one round. More detailed:

==== First round ====
- Tie played on October 12, 1988, and on October 19, 1988.

Team 1	Agg.	Team 2	1st leg	2nd leg
Panionios (Greece)	166–170	(Socialist Federal Republic of Yugoslavia) Smelt Olimpija	88–73	78–97

== 1990s ==
=== 1989–90 FIBA Korać Cup, 3rd–tier ===
The 1989–90 FIBA Korać Cup was the 19th installment of the European 3rd-tier level professional basketball club competition FIBA Korać Cup, running from September 27, 1989, to March 28, 1990. The trophy was won by Ram Joventut, who defeated Scavolini Pesaro by a result of 195–184 in a two-legged final on a home and away basis. Overall, Panionios achieved in present competition a record of 8 wins against 4 defeats, in four successive rounds. More detailed:

==== First round ====
- Tie played on September 27, 1989, and on October 4, 1989.

Team 1	Agg.	Team 2	1st leg	2nd leg
Pezoporikos Larnaca (Cyprus)	165–218	(Greece) Panionios	88–99	77–119

==== Second round ====
- Tie played on October 25, 1989, and on November 1, 1989.

Team 1	Agg.	Team 2	1st leg	2nd leg
TTL Bamberg (West Germany)	155–182	(Greece) Panionios	66–86	89–96

==== Top 16 ====
- Day 1 (December 6, 1989)

Team 1	Score	Team 2
Hapoel Holon (Israel)	85–86	(Greece) Panionios

- Day 2 (December 13, 1989)

Team 1	Score	Team 2
SKA Alma-Ata (Soviet Union)	99–96	(Greece) Panionios

- Day 3 (January 17, 1990)

Team 1	Score	Team 2
Panionios (Greece)	93–95	(Turkey) Efes Pilsen

- Day 4 (January 24, 1990)

Team 1	Score	Team 2
Panionios (Greece)	91–88	(Israel) Hapoel Holon

- Day 5 (January 31, 1990)

Team 1	Score	Team 2
Panionios (Greece)	107–98	(Soviet Union) SKA Alma-Ata

- Day 6 (February 7, 1990)

Team 1	Score	Team 2
Efes Pilsen (Turkey)	94–84	(Greece) Panionios

- Group B standings:

Pos.	Team	Pld.	Pts.	W	L	PF	PA	PD	Tie-break
1.	(Turkey) Efes Pilsen	6	10	4	2	540	524	+16	
2.	(Greece) Panionios	6	9	3	3	557	559	-2	1–1 (+6)
3.	(Soviet Union) SKA Alma-Ata	6	9	3	3	566	561	+5	1–1 (-6)
4.	(Israel) Hapoel Holon	6	8	2	4	532	551	-18	

==== Quarterfinals ====
- Tie played on February 21, 1990, and on February 28, 1990.

Team 1	Agg.	Team 2	1st leg	2nd leg
Panionios (Greece)	160–191	(Soviet Union) CSKA Moscow	107–85	53–106

=== 1990–91 FIBA Korać Cup, 3rd–tier ===
The 1990–91 FIBA Korać Cup was the 20th installment of the European 3rd-tier level professional basketball club competition FIBA Korać Cup, running from September 26, 1990, to March 27, 1991. The trophy was won by Shampoo Clear Cantù, who defeated Real Madrid Otaysa by a result of 168–164 in a two-legged final on a home and away basis. Overall, Panionios achieved in present competition a record of 6 wins against 4 defeats, in three successive rounds. More detailed:

==== First round ====
- Tie played on September 26, 1990, and on October 3, 1990.

Team 1	Agg.	Team 2	1st leg	2nd leg
Universitatea Cluj (Romania)	184–192	(Greece) Panionios	98–89	86–103

==== Second round ====
- Tie played on October 24, 1990, and on October 31, 1990.

Team 1	Agg.	Team 2	1st leg	2nd leg
Panasonic Reggio Calabria (Italy)	154–163	(Greece) Panionios	77–73	77–90

==== Top 16 ====
- Day 1 (December 12, 1990)

Team 1	Score	Team 2
Panionios (Greece)	91–81	(Socialist Federal Republic of Yugoslavia) Zadar

- Day 2 (December 19, 1990)

Team 1	Score	Team 2
Panionios (Greece)	97–91	(Belgium) Sunair Oostende

- Day 3 (January 2, 1991)

Team 1	Score	Team 2
Estudiantes Caja Postal (Spain)	85–81	(Greece) Panionios

- Day 4 (January 9, 1991)

Team 1	Score	Team 2
Zadar (Socialist Federal Republic of Yugoslavia)	127–99	(Greece) Panionios

- Day 5 (January 16, 1991)

Team 1	Score	Team 2
Sunair Oostende (Belgium)	101–103	(Greece) Panionios

- Day 6 (January 23, 1991)

Team 1	Score	Team 2
Panionios (Greece)	87–71	(Spain) Estudiantes Caja Postal

- Group D standings:

Pos.	Team	Pld.	Pts.	W	L	PF	PA	PD	Tie-break
1.	(Socialist Federal Republic of Yugoslavia) Zadar	6	10	4	2	589	538	+51	2–2 (+9)
2.	(Spain) Estudiantes Caja Postal	6	10	4	2	526	501	+25	2–2 (-3)
3.	(Greece) Panionios	6	10	4	2	558	556	+2	2–2 (-6)
4.	(Belgium) Sunair Oostende	6	6	0	6	524	602	-78	

=== 1991–92 FIBA European Cup, 2nd–tier ===
The 1991–92 FIBA European Cup was the 26th installment of FIBA's 2nd-tier level European-wide professional club basketball competition FIBA European Cup (lately called FIBA Saporta Cup), running from September 10, 1991, to March 17, 1992. The trophy was won by Real Madrid Asegurator, who defeated the title holder PAOK by a result of 65–63 at Palais des Sports de Beaulieu in Nantes, France. Overall, Panionios achieved in the present competition a record of 8 wins against 8 defeats, in four successive rounds. More detailed:

==== First round ====
- Tie played on September 8, 1991, and on September 10, 1991.

Team 1	Agg.	Team 2	1st leg	2nd leg
Slavia Sofia (Bulgaria)	147–181	(Greece) Panionios	77–83	70–98

==== Second round ====
- Tie played on October 1, 1991, and on October 8, 1991.

Team 1	Agg.	Team 2	1st leg	2nd leg
Sparta Praha (Czechoslovakia)	171–184	(Greece) Panionios	87–81	84–103

==== Third round ====
- Tie played on October 29, 1991, and on November 5, 1991.

Team 1	Agg.	Team 2	1st leg	2nd leg
Panionios (Greece)	222–180	(Cyprus) Pezoporikos Larnaca	118–95	104–85

==== Top 12 ====
- Day 1 (November 26, 1991)

Team 1	Score	Team 2
Panionios (Greece)	101–76	(France) Pau-Orthez

- Day 2 (December 3, 1991)

Team 1	Score	Team 2
Panionios (Greece)	89–77	(Portugal) Benfica

- Day 3 (December 10, 1991)

Team 1	Score	Team 2
Smelt Olimpija (Slovenia)	95–83	(Greece) Panionios

- Day 4 (December 17, 1991)

Team 1	Score	Team 2
Hapoel Galil Elyon (Israel)	93–85	(Greece) Panionios

- Day 5 (January 7, 1992)

Team 1	Score	Team 2
Panionios (Greece)	74–88	(Spain) Real Madrid Asegurator

- Day 6 (January 15, 1992)

Team 1	Score	Team 2
Pau-Orthez (France)	87–82	(Greece) Panionios

- Day 7 (January 21, 1992)

Team 1	Score	Team 2
Benfica (Portugal)	88–76	(Greece) Panionios

- Day 8 (January 28, 1992)

Team 1	Score	Team 2
Panionios (Greece)	80–85	(Slovenia) Smelt Olimpija

- Day 9 (February 4, 1992)

Team 1	Score	Team 2
Panionios (Greece)	91–71	(Israel) Hapoel Galil Elyon

- Day 10 (February 11, 1992)

Team 1	Score	Team 2
Real Madrid Asegurator (Spain)	87–71	(Greece) Panionios

- Group B standings:

Pos.	Team	Pld.	Pts.	W	L	PF	PA	PD	Tie-break
1.	(Spain) Real Madrid Asegurator	10	19	9	1	917	832	+85	
2.	(Slovenia) Smelt Olimpija	10	17	7	3	878	829	+49	
3.	(France) Pau-Orthez	10	16	6	4	899	889	+10	
4.	(Greece) Panionios	10	13	3	7	832	847	-15	1–1 (0)
5.	(Portugal) Benfica	10	13	3	7	787	851	-64	1–1 (0)
6.	(Israel) Hapoel Galil Elyon	10	12	2	8	877	942	-65	

=== 1992–93 FIBA Korać Cup, 3rd–tier ===
The 1992–93 FIBA Korać Cup was the 22nd installment of the European 3rd-tier level professional basketball club competition FIBA Korać Cup, running from September 9, 1992, to March 18, 1993. The trophy was won by Philips Milano, who defeated Virtus Roma by a result of 201–181 in a two-legged final on a home and away basis. Overall, Chipita Panionios achieved in present competition a record of 7 wins against 5 defeats, in five successive rounds. More detailed:

==== First round ====
- Bye

==== Second round ====
- Tie played on September 30, 1992, and on October 7, 1992.

Team 1	Agg.	Team 2	1st leg	2nd leg
Levski Sofia (Bulgaria)	139–162	(Greece) Chipita Panionios	67-70	72–92

==== Third round ====
- Tie played on October 28, 1992, and on November 4, 1992.

Team 1	Agg.	Team 2	1st leg	2nd leg
Nová huť ANES Ostrava (Czechoslovakia)	137–163	(Greece) Chipita Panionios	62-82	75–81

==== Top 16 ====
- Day 1 (November 25, 1992)

Team 1	Score	Team 2
Virtus Roma (Italy)	85–97	(Greece) Chipita Panionios

- Day 2 (December 2, 1992)

Team 1	Score	Team 2
Chipita Panionios (Greece)	79–56	(Spain) Taugrés

- Day 3 (December 8, 1992)

Team 1	Score	Team 2
Olympique Antibes (France)	71–68	(Greece) Chipita Panionios

- Day 4 (December 16, 1992)

Team 1	Score	Team 2
Chipita Panionios (Greece)	65–67	(Italy) Virtus Roma

- Day 5 (January 6, 1993)

Team 1	Score	Team 2
Taugrés (Spain)	76–74	(Greece) Chipita Panionios

- Day 6 (January 13, 1993)

Team 1	Score	Team 2
Chipita Panionios (Greece)	101–87	(France) Olympique Antibes

- Group C standings:

Pos.	Team	Pld.	Pts.	W	L	PF	PA	PD	Tie-break
1.	(Italy) Virtus Roma	6	10	4	2	475	476	-1	
2.	(Greece) Chipita Panionios	6	9	3	3	484	442	+42	1–1 (+11)
3.	(France) Olympique Antibes	6	9	3	3	526	530	-4	1–1 (-11)
4.	(Spain) Taugrés	6	8	2	4	464	501	-35	

==== Quarterfinals ====
- Tie played on January 27, 1993, and on February 3, 1993.

Team 1	Agg.	Team 2	1st leg	2nd leg
Chipita Panionios (Greece)	152–160	(Italy) Philips Milano	78–79	74–81

=== 1993–94 FIBA Korać Cup, 3rd–tier ===
The 1993–94 FIBA Korać Cup was the 23rd installment of the European 3rd-tier level professional basketball club competition FIBA Korać Cup, running from September 8, 1993, to March 16, 1994. The trophy was won by PAOK Bravo, who defeated Stefanel Trieste by a result of 175–157 in a two-legged final on a home and away basis. Overall, Chipita Panionios achieved in present competition a record of 10 wins against 4 defeats, in six successive rounds. More detailed:

==== First round ====
- Bye

==== Second round ====
- Tie played on September 29, 1993, and on October 6, 1993.

Team 1	Agg.	Team 2	1st leg	2nd leg
Slovenica Koper (Slovenia)	165–195	(Greece) Chipita Panionios	73–91	92–104

==== Third round ====
- Tie played on October 27, 1993, and on November 2, 1993.

Team 1	Agg.	Team 2	1st leg	2nd leg
Pezoporikos Larnaca (Cyprus)	148–185	(Greece) Chipita Panionios	69–86	79–99

==== Top 16 ====
- Day 1 (November 24, 1993)

Team 1	Score	Team 2
Chipita Panionios (Greece)	86–71	(Turkey) Fenerbahçe

- Day 2 (November 30, 1993)

Team 1	Score	Team 2
NatWest Zaragoza (Spain)	74–78	(Greece) Chipita Panionios

- Day 3 (December 7, 1993)

Team 1	Score	Team 2
Chipita Panionios (Greece)	74–58	(Italy) Stefanel Trieste

- Day 4 (December 15, 1993)

Team 1	Score	Team 2
Fenerbahçe (Turkey)	102–87	(Greece) Chipita Panionios

- Day 5 (January 6, 1994)

Team 1	Score	Team 2
Chipita Panionios (Greece)	95–81	(Spain) NatWest Zaragoza

- Day 6 (January 12, 1994)

Team 1	Score	Team 2
Stefanel Trieste (Italy)	94–79	(Greece) Chipita Panionios

- Group A standings:

Pos.	Team	Pld.	Pts.	W	L	PF	PA	PD
1.	(Italy) Stefanel Trieste	6	11	5	1	485	463	+22
2.	(Greece) Chipita Panionios	6	10	4	2	499	480	+19
3.	(Turkey) Fenerbahçe	6	9	3	3	479	484	-5
4.	(Spain) NatWest Zaragoza	6	6	0	6	449	485	-36

==== Quarterfinals ====
- Tie played on January 26, 1994, and on February 2, 1994.

Team 1	Agg.	Team 2	1st leg	2nd leg
Chipita Panionios (Greece)	169–146	(Israel) Maccabi Tel Aviv	92–72	77–74

==== Semifinals ====
- Tie played on February 16, 1994, and on February 23, 1994.

Team 1	Agg.	Team 2	1st leg	2nd leg
Chipita Panionios (Greece)	147–167	(Greece) PAOK Bravo	83–85	64–82

=== 1994–95 FIBA Korać Cup, 3rd–tier ===
The 1994–95 FIBA Korać Cup was the 24th installment of the European 3rd-tier level professional basketball club competition FIBA Korać Cup, running from September 7, 1994, to March 15, 1995. The trophy was won by Alba Berlin, who defeated Stefanel Milano by a result of 172–166 in a two-legged final on a home and away basis. Overall, Chipita Panionios achieved in present competition a record of 9 wins against 3 defeats, in five successive rounds. More detailed:

==== First round ====
- Bye

==== Second round ====
- Tie played on September 28, 1994, and on October 4, 1994.

Team 1	Agg.	Team 2	1st leg	2nd leg
Sakalai (Lithuania)	128–173	(Greece) Chipita Panionios	69–72	59–101

==== Third round ====
- Tie played on October 26, 1994, and on November 1, 1994.

Team 1	Agg.	Team 2	1st leg	2nd leg
Maccabi Rishon LeZion (Israel)	137–188	(Greece) Chipita Panionios	72–84	65–104

==== Top 16 ====
- Day 1 (November 23, 1994)

Team 1	Score	Team 2
Caja San Fernando (Spain)	73–76	(Greece) Chipita Panionios

- Day 2 (November 30, 1994)

Team 1	Score	Team 2
illycaffè Trieste (Italy)	72–71	(Greece) Chipita Panionios

- Day 3 (December 6, 1994)

Team 1	Score	Team 2
Chipita Panionios (Greece)	94–81	(Russia) Dynamo Moscow

- Day 4 (December 13, 1994)

Team 1	Score	Team 2
Chipita Panionios (Greece)	85–59	(Spain) Caja San Fernando

- Day 5 (January 3, 1995)

Team 1	Score	Team 2
Chipita Panionios (Greece)	90–73	(Italy) illycaffè Trieste

- Day 6 (January 11, 1995)

Team 1	Score	Team 2
Dynamo Moscow (Russia)	87–96	(Greece) Chipita Panionios

- Group C standings:

Pos.	Team	Pld.	Pts.	W	L	PF	PA	PD
1.	(Greece) Chipita Panionios	6	11	5	1	513	444	+69
2.	(Italy) illycaffè Trieste	6	10	4	2	496	515	-19
3.	(Spain) Caja San Fernando	6	8	2	4	496	489	+7
4.	(Russia) Dynamo Moscow	6	7	1	5	490	547	-57

==== Quarterfinals ====
- Tie played on January 25, 1995, and on February 1, 1995.

Team 1	Agg.	Team 2	1st leg	2nd leg
Stefanel Milano (Italy)	155–132	(Greece) Chipita Panionios	73–59	82–73

=== 1995–96 FIBA Korać Cup, 3rd–tier ===
The 1995–96 FIBA Korać Cup was the 25th installment of the European 3rd-tier level professional basketball club competition FIBA Korać Cup, running from September 6, 1995, to March 13, 1996. The trophy was won by Efes Pilsen, who defeated Stefanel Milano by a result of 146–145 in a two-legged final on a home and away basis. Overall, Panionios Afisorama achieved in present competition a record of 7 wins against 3 defeats, in four successive rounds. More detailed:

==== First round ====
- Bye

==== Second round ====
- Tie played on September 27, 1995, and on October 4, 1995.

Team 1	Agg.	Team 2	1st leg	2nd leg
Steiner Bayreuth (Germany)	131–163	(Greece) Panionios Afisorama	64–85	67–78

==== Third round ====
- Tie played on October 25, 1995, and on October 31, 1995.

Team 1	Agg.	Team 2	1st leg	2nd leg
Borovica (Federal Republic of Yugoslavia)	140–162	(Greece) Panionios Afisorama	75–77	65–85

==== Top 16 ====
- Day 1 (November 22, 1995)

Team 1	Score	Team 2
Festina Andorra (Spain)	63–72	(Greece) Panionios Afisorama

- Day 2 (November 29, 1995)

Team 1	Score	Team 2
Efes Pilsen (Turkey)	68–66	(Greece) Panionios Afisorama

- Day 3 (December 6, 1995)

Team 1	Score	Team 2
Panionios Afisorama (Greece)	68–61	(Italy) Cagiva Varese

- Day 4 (December 13, 1995)

Team 1	Score	Team 2
Panionios Afisorama (Greece)	80–68	(Spain) Festina Andorra

- Day 5 (December 19, 1995)

Team 1	Score	Team 2
Panionios Afisorama (Greece)	68–75	(Turkey) Efes Pilsen

- Day 6 (January 3, 1996)

Team 1	Score	Team 2
Cagiva Varese (Italy)	96–91	(Greece) Panionios Afisorama

- Group B standings:

Pos.	Team	Pld.	Pts.	W	L	PF	PA	PD
1.	(Turkey) Efes Pilsen	6	11	5	1	429	389	+40
2.	(Italy) Cagiva Varese	6	10	4	2	458	429	+29
3.	(Greece) Panionios Afisorama	6	9	3	3	445	431	-14
4.	(Spain) Festina Andorra	6	6	0	6	380	463	-83

=== 1996–97 FIBA EuroLeague, 1st–tier ===
The 1996–97 FIBA EuroLeague was the 40th installment of the European top-tier level professional club competition for basketball clubs (now called simply EuroLeague), running from September 19, 1996, to April 24, 1997. The trophy was won by Olympiacos, who defeated FC Barcelona Banca Catalana by a result of 73–58 at PalaEUR in Rome, Italy. Overall, Panionios Ethniki Asfalistiki achieved in present competition a record of 4 wins against 12 defeats, in two successive rounds. More detailed:

==== First round ====
- Day 1 (September 19, 1996)

Team 1	Score	Team 2
Panionios Ethniki Asfalistiki (Greece)	72–67	(Russia) CSKA Moscow

- Day 2 (September 26, 1996)

Team 1	Score	Team 2
Ülker (Turkey)	87–69	(Greece) Panionios Ethniki Asfalistiki

- Day 3 (October 2, 1996)

Team 1	Score	Team 2
Panionios Ethniki Asfalistiki (Greece)	92–77	(France) Limoges CSP

- Day 4 (October 10, 1996)

Team 1	Score	Team 2
Panionios Ethniki Asfalistiki (Greece)	69–74	(Israel) Maccabi Tel Aviv

- Day 5 (October 17, 1996)

Team 1	Score	Team 2
Stefanel Milano (Italy)	90–66	(Greece) Panionios Ethniki Asfalistiki

- Day 6 (November 7, 1996)

Team 1	Score	Team 2
CSKA Moscow (Russia)	96–66	(Greece) Panionios Ethniki Asfalistiki

- Day 7 (November 14, 1996)

Team 1	Score	Team 2
Panionios Ethniki Asfalistiki (Greece)	84–71	(Turkey) Ülker

- Day 8 (November 21, 1996)

Team 1	Score	Team 2
Limoges CSP (France)	78–75	(Greece) Panionios Ethniki Asfalistiki

- Day 9 (December 5, 1996)

Team 1	Score	Team 2
Maccabi Tel Aviv (Israel)	69–57	(Greece) Panionios Ethniki Asfalistiki

- Day 10 (December 12, 1996)

Team 1	Score	Team 2
Panionios Ethniki Asfalistiki (Greece)	79–86	(Italy) Stefanel Milano

- Group A standings:

Pos.	Team	Pld.	Pts.	W	L	PF	PA	PD	Tie-break
1.	(Italy) Stefanel Milano	10	17	7	3	775	727	+48	
2.	(Russia) CSKA Moscow	10	16	6	4	761	734	+27	2–0
3.	(Israel) Maccabi Tel Aviv	10	16	6	4	798	773	+26	0–2
4.	(Turkey) Ülker	10	14	4	6	780	767	+13	1–1 (+4)
5.	(France) Limoges CSP	10	14	4	6	731	723	+8	1–1 (-4)
6.	(Greece) Panionios Ethniki Asfalistiki	10	13	3	7	711	830	-119	

==== Second round ====
- Day 1 (January 9, 1997)

Team 1	Score	Team 2
Panionios Ethniki Asfalistiki (Greece)	72–88	(Italy) Teamsystem Bologna

- Day 2 (January 16, 1997)

Team 1	Score	Team 2
Cibona (Croatia)	85–58	(Greece) Panionios Ethniki Asfalistiki

- Day 3 (January 23, 1997)

Team 1	Score	Team 2
Panionios Ethniki Asfalistiki (Greece)	91–95	(Spain) Estudiantes Argentaria

- Day 4 (February 5, 1997)

Team 1	Score	Team 2
Teamsystem Bologna (Italy)	94–58	(Greece) Panionios Ethniki Asfalistiki

- Day 5 (February 13, 1997)

Team 1	Score	Team 2
Panionios Ethniki Asfalistiki (Greece)	84–76	(Croatia) Cibona

- Day 6 (February 20, 1997)

Team 1	Score	Team 2
Estudiantes Argentaria (Spain)	92–70	(Greece) Panionios Ethniki Asfalistiki

- Group F standings:

Pos.	Team	Pld.	Pts.	W	L	PF	PA	PD
1.	(Italy) Teamsystem Bologna	16	28	12	4	1262	1163	+99
2.	(Croatia) Cibona	16	26	10	6	1166	1126	+40
3.	(Spain) Estudiantes Argentaria	16	25	9	7	1309	1284	+25
4.	(France) Limoges CSP	16	24	8	8	1226	1235	-9
5.	(Turkey) Ülker	16	21	5	11	1196	1243	-47
6.	(Greece) Panionios Ethniki Asfalistiki	16	20	4	12	1162	1325	-163

=== 1998–99 FIBA Korać Cup, 3rd–tier ===
The 1998–99 FIBA Korać Cup was the 28th installment of the European 3rd-tier level professional basketball club competition FIBA Korać Cup, running from September 16, 1998, to March 31, 1999. The trophy was won by FC Barcelona, who defeated Adecco Estudiantes by a result of 174–163 in a two-legged final on a home and away basis. Overall, Panionios Nutella achieved in present competition a record of 9 wins against 5 defeats, in six successive rounds. More detailed:

==== First round ====
- Bye

==== Second round ====
- Day 1 (October 7, 1998)

Team 1	Score	Team 2
Panionios Nutella (Greece)	69–68	(Switzerland) Fribourg Olympic

- Day 2 (October 14, 1998)

Team 1	Score	Team 2
Keravnos Kéo (Cyprus)	76–65	(Greece) Panionios Nutella

- Day 3 (October 21, 1998)

Team 1	Score	Team 2
Panionios Nutella (Greece)	88–69	(Federal Republic of Yugoslavia) FMP Železnik

- Day 4 (November 4, 1998)

Team 1	Score	Team 2
Fribourg Olympic (Switzerland)	65–76*	(Greece) Panionios Nutella

^{*}Overtime at the end of regulation (60–60).

- Day 5 (November 11, 1998)

Team 1	Score	Team 2
Panionios Nutella (Greece)	81–74	(Cyprus) Keravnos Kéo

- Day 6 (November 18, 1998)

Team 1	Score	Team 2
FMP Železnik (Federal Republic of Yugoslavia)	68–79	(Greece) Panionios Nutella

- Group D standings:

Pos.	Team	Pld.	Pts.	W	L	PF	PA	PD	Tie-break
1.	(Greece) Panionios Nutella	6	11	5	1	458	488	+44	
2.	(Cyprus) Keravnos Keo	6	9	3	3	405	405	0	1–1 (+12)
3.	(Federal Republic of Yugoslavia) FMP Železnik	6	9	3	3	421	441	-20	1–1 (-12)
4.	(Switzerland) Fribourg Olympic	6	7	1	5	402	420	-18	

==== Third round ====
- Tie played on December 9, 1998, and on December 16, 1998.

Team 1	Agg.	Team 2	1st leg	2nd leg
Zucchetti Reggiana (Italy)	137–150	(Greece) Panionios Nutella	79–69	58–81

==== Top 16 ====
- Tie played on January 13, 1999, and on January 20, 1999.

Team 1	Agg.	Team 2	1st leg	2nd leg
Radnički Belgrade (Federal Republic of Yugoslavia)	145–169	(Greece) Panionios Nutella	74–88	71–81

==== Quarterfinals ====
- Tie played on February 10, 1999, and on February 17, 1999.

Team 1	Agg.	Team 2	1st leg	2nd leg
Panionios Nutella (Greece)	161–150	(France) JDA Dijon	87–66	74–84

==== Semifinals ====
- Tie played on March 3, 1999, and on March 11, 1999.

Team 1	Agg.	Team 2	1st leg	2nd leg
Panionios Nutella (Greece)	132–171	(Spain) FC Barcelona	71–80	61–91

== 2000s ==
=== 2001–02 FIBA Saporta Cup, 2nd–tier ===
The 2001–02 FIBA Saporta Cup was the 36th installment of FIBA's 2nd-tier level European-wide professional club basketball competition FIBA Saporta Cup, running from October 30, 2001, to April 30, 2002. The trophy was won by Montepaschi Siena, who defeated Pamesa Valencia by a result of 81–71 at Palais des Sports de Gerland in Lyon, France. Overall, Panionios achieved in the present competition a record of 8 wins against 6 defeats, in three successive rounds. More detailed:

==== Regular season ====
- Day 1 (October 30, 2001)

Team 1	Score	Team 2
Panionios (Greece)	83–79	(Turkey) Darüşşafaka

- Day 2 (November 7, 2001)

Team 1	Score	Team 2
Hapoel Jerusalem (Israel)	85–80	(Greece) Panionios

- Day 3 (November 13, 2001)

Team 1	Score	Team 2
Panionios (Greece)	108–83	(France) Le Mans Sarthe

- Day 4 (December 5, 2001)

Team 1	Score	Team 2
Montepaschi Siena (Italy)	74–71	(Greece) Panionios

- Day 5 (December 11, 2001)

Team 1	Score	Team 2
Panionios (Greece)	100–96	(Spain) Adecco Estudiantes

- Day 6 (December 18, 2001)

Team 1	Score	Team 2
Darüşşafaka (Turkey)	88–87	(Greece) Panionios

- Day 7 (January 9, 2002)

Team 1	Score	Team 2
Panionios (Greece)	97–86	(Israel) Hapoel Jerusalem

- Day 8 (January 15, 2002)

Team 1	Score	Team 2
Le Mans Sarthe (France)	88–75	(Greece) Panionios

- Day 9 (January 29, 2002)

Team 1	Score	Team 2
Panionios (Greece)	91–86	(Italy) Montepaschi Siena

- Day 10 (February 5, 2002)

Team 1	Score	Team 2
Adecco Estudiantes (Spain)	82–84	(Greece) Panionios

- Group B standings:

Pos.	Team	Pld.	Pts.	W	L	PF	PA	PD	Tie-break
1.	(Italy) Montepaschi Siena	10	17	7	3	851	760	+91	
2.	(Greece) Panionios	10	16	6	4	876	847	+29	3–1
3.	(Israel) Hapoel Jerusalem	10	16	6	4	785	755	+30	2–2
4.	(Spain) Adecco Estudiantes	10	16	6	4	883	848	+35	1–3
5.	(France) Le Mans Sarthe*	10	13	4	6	743	807	-64	
6.	(Turkey) Darüşşafaka	10	11	1	9	758	879	-121	

*Le Mans Sarthe was docked one point for not playing the game at Hapoel Jerusalem.

==== Top 16 ====
- Tie played on February 26, 2002, and on March 5, 2002.

Team 1	Agg.	Team 2	1st leg	2nd leg
Türk Telekom (Turkey)	143–145	(Greece) Panionios	80–74	63–71

==== Quarterfinals ====
- Tie played on March 20, 2002, and on March 27, 2002.

Team 1	Agg.	Team 2	1st leg	2nd leg
Panionios (Greece)	142–149	(Poland) Anwil Włocławek	83–74	59–75

=== 2002–03 FIBA Europe Champions Cup, 4th–tier ===
The 2002–03 FIBA Europe Champions Cup was the 1st installment of FIBA's 4th-tier level European-wide professional club basketball competition FIBA Europe Champions Cup (lately called FIBA EuroCup Challenge), running from October 1, 2002, to May 4, 2003. The trophy was won by Aris, who defeated Prokom Trefl Sopot by a result of 84–83 at Alexandreio Melathron in Thessaloniki, Greece. Overall, Panionios Freddoccino achieved in the present competition a record of 6 wins against 4 defeats, in only one round. More detailed:

==== Regular season ====
- Day 1 (October 1, 2002)

Team 1	Score	Team 2
Panionios Freddoccino (Greece)	89–80	(Israel) Hapoel Tel Aviv

- Day 2 (October 9, 2002)

Team 1	Score	Team 2
Hemofarm (Serbia and Montenegro)	82–61	(Greece) Panionios Freddoccino

- Day 3 (October 15, 2002)

Team 1	Score	Team 2
Panionios Freddoccino (Greece)	102–82	(Bulgaria) Levski Sofia

- Day 4 (October 22, 2002)

Team 1	Score	Team 2
Panionios Freddoccino (Greece)	73–82	(Turkey) Türk Telekom

- Day 5 (October 29, 2002)

Team 1	Score	Team 2
Sloboda Dita (Bosnia and Herzegovina)	73–74	(Greece) Panionios Freddoccino

- Day 6 (November 5, 2002)

Team 1	Score	Team 2
Hapoel Tel Aviv (Israel)	86–72	(Greece) Panionios Freddoccino

- Day 7 (November 12, 2002)

Team 1	Score	Team 2
Panionios Freddoccino (Greece)	82–72	(Serbia and Montenegro) Hemofarm

- Day 8 (December 3, 2002)

Team 1	Score	Team 2
Levski Sofia (Bulgaria)	88–99	(Greece) Panionios Freddoccino

- Day 9 (December 11, 2002)

Team 1	Score	Team 2
Türk Telekom (Turkey)	82–75	(Greece) Panionios Freddoccino

- Day 10 (December 17, 2002)

Team 1	Score	Team 2
Panionios Freddoccino (Greece)	93–72	(Bosnia and Herzegovina) Sloboda Dita

- Conference South Group B standings:

Pos.	Team	Pld.	W	L	PF	PA	PD	Tie-break
1.	(Turkey) Türk Telekom	10	8	2	801	749	+52	
2.	(Serbia and Montenegro) Hemofarm	10	7	3	825	726	+99	1–1 (+14)
3.	(Israel) Hapoel Tel Aviv	10	7	3	806	742	+64	1–1 (-14)
4.	(Greece) Panionios Freddoccino	10	6	4	820	799	+21	
5.	(Bulgaria) Levski Sofia	10	1	9	793	872	-79	1–1 (+1)
6.	(Bosnia and Herzegovina) Sloboda Dita	10	1	9	684	841	-157	1–1 (-1)

=== 2005–06 ULEB Cup, 2nd–tier ===
The 2005–06 ULEB Cup was the 4th installment of ULEB's 2nd-tier level European-wide professional club basketball competition ULEB Cup (lately called EuroCup Basketball), running from November 8, 2005, to April 11, 2006. The trophy was won by Dynamo Moscow, who defeated Aris TT Bank by a result of 73–60 at Spiroudome in Charleroi, Belgium. Overall, Panionios Forthnet achieved in the present competition a record of 5 wins against 7 defeats, in two successive rounds. More detailed:

==== Regular season ====
- Day 1 (November 8, 2005)

Team 1	Score	Team 2
Landi Renzo Reggio Emilia (Italy)	67–61	(Greece) Panionios Forthnet

- Day 2 (November 15, 2005)

Team 1	Score	Team 2
Panionios Forthnet (Greece)	79–74	(Netherlands) Demon Ricoh Astronauts

- Day 3 (November 22, 2005)

Team 1	Score	Team 2
Panionios Forthnet (Greece)	65–82	(Serbia and Montenegro) Hemofarm

- Day 4 (November 29, 2005)

Team 1	Score	Team 2
Adecco ASVEL (France)	83–61	(Greece) Panionios Forthnet

- Day 5 (December 6, 2005)

Team 1	Score	Team 2
Panionios Forthnet (Greece)	70–62	(Poland) Anwil Włocławek

- Day 6 (December 13, 2005)

Team 1	Score	Team 2
Panionios Forthnet (Greece)	79–75	(Italy) Landi Renzo Reggio Emilia

- Day 7 (December 20, 2005)

Team 1	Score	Team 2
Demon Ricoh Astronauts (Netherlands)	80–90	(Greece) Panionios Forthnet

- Day 8 (January 3, 2006)

Team 1	Score	Team 2
Hemofarm (Serbia and Montenegro)	79–71	(Greece) Panionios Forthnet

- Day 9 (January 10, 2006)

Team 1	Score	Team 2
Panionios Forthnet (Greece)	76–79	(France) Adecco ASVEL

- Day 10 (January 17, 2006)

Team 1	Score	Team 2
Anwil Włocławek (Poland)	65–58	(Greece) Panionios Forthnet

- Group B standings:

Pos.	Team	Pld.	W	L	PF	PA	PD	Tie-break
1.	(Italy) Landi Renzo Reggio Emilia	10	7	3	791	705	+86	1–1 (+12)
2.	(Serbia and Montenegro) Hemofarm	10	7	3	756	703	+53	1–1 (-12)
3.	(France) Adecco ASVEL	10	6	4	743	722	+21	
4.	(Greece) Panionios Forthnet	10	4	6	710	746	-36	
5.	(Poland) Anwil Włocławek	10	3	7	667	711	-44	1–1 (+4)
6.	(Netherlands) Demon Ricoh Astronauts	10	3	7	700	780	-80	1–1 (-4)

==== Top 16 ====
- Tie played on January 31, 2006, and on February 7, 2006.

Team 1	Agg.	Team 2	1st leg	2nd leg
Panionios Forthnet (Greece)	175–184	(Greece) Aris TT Bank	70–72	105–112*

^{*}The score in the second leg at the end of regulation was 81–79 for Panionios Forthnet, so it was necessary to play two extra-times to decide the winner of this match (94–92 and finally 105–112 for Aris TT Bank).

=== 2006–07 FIBA EuroCup, 3rd–tier ===
The 2006–07 FIBA EuroCup was the 4th installment of FIBA's 3rd-tier level European-wide professional club basketball competition FIBA EuroCup (lately called FIBA EuroChallenge), running from November 7, 2006, to April 15, 2007. The trophy was won by Akasvayu Girona, who defeated Azovmash Mariupol by a result of 79–72 at Pavelló Municipal Girona-Fontajau in Girona, Spain. Overall, Panionios Forthnet achieved in the present competition a record of 9 wins against 6 defeats, in three successive rounds. More detailed:

==== Regular season ====
- Day 1 (November 7, 2006)

Team 1	Score	Team 2
Panionios Forthnet (Greece)	84–76	(Turkey) Türk Telekom

- Day 2 (November 14, 2006)

Team 1	Score	Team 2
Ural Great Perm (Russia)	70–77	(Greece) Panionios Forthnet

- Day 3 (November 22, 2006)

Team 1	Score	Team 2
CSKA Sofia (Bulgaria)	86–83*	(Greece) Panionios Forthnet

^{*}Overtime at the end of regulation (73–73).

- Day 4 (November 28, 2006)

Team 1	Score	Team 2
Türk Telekom (Turkey)	82–75	(Greece) Panionios Forthnet

- Day 5 (December 5, 2006)

Team 1	Score	Team 2
Panionios Forthnet (Greece)	80–62	(Russia) Ural Great Perm

- Day 6 (December 12, 2006)

Team 1	Score	Team 2
Panionios Forthnet (Greece)	88–70	(Bulgaria) CSKA Sofia

- Group G standings:

Pos.	Team	Pld.	W	L	PF	PA	PD
1.	(Turkey) Türk Telekom	6	5	1	506	470	+36
2.	(Greece) Panionios Forthnet	6	4	2	487	446	+41
3.	(Russia) Ural Great Perm	6	2	4	461	490	-29
4.	(Bulgaria) CSKA Sofia	6	1	5	474	522	-48

==== Top 16 ====
- Day 1 (January 9, 2007)

Team 1	Score	Team 2
Lokomotiv Rostov (Russia)	60–62	(Greece) Panionios Forthnet

- Day 2 (January 16, 2007)

Team 1	Score	Team 2
Panionios Forthnet (Greece)	68–71	(Turkey) Türk Telekom

- Day 3 (January 23, 2007)

Team 1	Score	Team 2
Spirou Charleroi (Belgium)	71–64	(Greece) Panionios Forthnet

- Day 4 (January 30, 2007)

Team 1	Score	Team 2
Panionios Forthnet (Greece)	75–57	(Russia) Lokomotiv Rostov

- Day 5 (February 13, 2007)

Team 1	Score	Team 2
Türk Telekom (Turkey)	78–77	(Greece) Panionios Forthnet

- Day 6 (February 20, 2007)

Team 1	Score	Team 2
Panionios Forthnet (Greece)	80–68	(Belgium) Spirou Charleroi

- Group K standings:

Pos.	Team	Pld.	W	L	PF	PA	PD	Tie-break
1.	(Turkey) Türk Telekom	6	5	1	471	452	+19	
2.	(Greece) Panionios Forthnet	6	3	3	426	405	+21	2–0
3.	(Russia) Lokomotiv Rostov	6	3	3	429	431	-2	0–2
4.	(Belgium) Spirou Charleroi	6	1	5	413	451	-38	

==== Quarterfinals ====
- Best-of-3 playoff: Game 1 away on March 6, 2007 / Game 2 at home on March 8, 2007 / Game 3 away on March 14, 2007.

Team 1	Agg.	Team 2	1st leg	2nd leg	3rd leg
Akasvayu Girona (Spain)	2–1	(Greece) Panionios Forthnet	76–68	69–82	83-49

=== 2007–08 ULEB Cup, 2nd–tier ===
The 2007–08 ULEB Cup was the 6th installment of ULEB's 2nd-tier level European-wide professional club basketball competition ULEB Cup (lately called EuroCup Basketball), running from November 6, 2007, to April 13, 2008. The trophy was won by DKV Joventut, who defeated Akasvayu Girona by a result of 79–54 at Palavela in Turin, Italy. Overall, Panionios On Telecoms achieved in the present competition a record of 6 wins against 6 defeats, in two successive rounds. More detailed:

==== Regular season ====
- Day 1 (November 6, 2007)

Team 1	Score	Team 2
Kalev Cramo (Estonia)	81–68	(Greece) Panionios On Telecoms

- Day 2 (November 13, 2007)

Team 1	Score	Team 2
Panionios On Telecoms (Greece)	72–61	(Poland) ASCO Śląsk Wrocław

- Day 3 (November 20, 2007)

Team 1	Score	Team 2
Panionios On Telecoms (Greece)	91–98*	(France) ASVEL

^{*}Overtime at the end of regulation (81–81).

- Day 4 (November 27, 2007)

Team 1	Score	Team 2
Gran Canaria Grupo Dunas (Spain)	82–73	(Greece) Panionios On Telecoms

- Day 5 (December 5, 2007)

Team 1	Score	Team 2
EnBW Ludwigsburg (Germany)	77–85	(Greece) Panionios On Telecoms

- Day 6 (December 11, 2007)

Team 1	Score	Team 2
Panionios On Telecoms (Greece)	90–66	(Estonia) Kalev Cramo

- Day 7 (December 18, 2007)

Team 1	Score	Team 2
ASCO Śląsk Wrocław (Poland)	92–94	(Greece) Panionios On Telecoms

- Day 8 (January 8, 2008)

Team 1	Score	Team 2
ASVEL (France)	87–89	(Greece) Panionios On Telecoms

- Day 9 (January 15, 2008)

Team 1	Score	Team 2
Panionios On Telecoms (Greece)	74–79	(Spain) Gran Canaria Grupo Dunas

- Day 10 (January 22, 2008)

Team 1	Score	Team 2
Panionios On Telecoms (Greece)	86–95	(Germany) EnBW Ludwigsburg

- Group G standings:

Pos.	Team	Pld.	W	L	PF	PA	PD	Tie-break
1.	(Spain) Kalise Gran Canaria*	10	8	2	820	752	+68	
2.	(France) ASVEL	10	6	4	864	809	+55	
3.	(Greece) Panionios On Telecoms	10	5	5	822	818	+4	2–0
4.	(Poland) ASCO Śląsk Wrocław	10	5	5	785	760	+25	0–2
5.	(Germany) EnBW Ludwigsburg	10	3	7	811	852	-41	1–1 (+21)
6.	(Estonia) Kalev Cramo	10	3	7	727	838	-111	1–1 (-21)

^{*}On 17/01/2008, Gran Canaria Grupo Dunas signed a new contract for the rest of the season and three years more with a new sponsor (Grupo Kalise Menorquina) and adopted the commercial name Kalise Gran Canaria.

==== Top 32 ====
- Tie played on February 19, 2008, and on February 27, 2008.

Team 1	Agg.	Team 2	1st leg	2nd leg
Panionios On Telecoms (Greece)	131–141	(Spain) Pamesa Valencia	70–59	61–82

=== 2008–09 Euroleague, 1st–tier ===
The 2008–09 Euroleague was the 9th season of the EuroLeague, under the Euroleague Basketball Company's authority, and it was the 52nd installment of the European top-tier level professional club competition for basketball clubs, running from October 23, 2008, to May 3, 2009. The trophy was won by Panathinaikos, who defeated the title holder CSKA Moscow by a result of 73–71 at O2 World in Berlin, Germany. Overall, Panionios On Telecoms achieved in present competition a record of 3 wins against 7 defeats, in only one round. More detailed:

==== Regular season ====
- Day 1 (October 23, 2008)

Team 1	Score	Team 2
Real Madrid (Spain)	87–66	(Greece) Panionios On Telecoms

- Day 2 (October 29, 2008)

Team 1	Score	Team 2
Panionios On Telecoms (Greece)	52–86	(Russia) CSKA Moscow

- Day 3 (November 5, 2008)

Team 1	Score	Team 2
Efes Pilsen (Turkey)	69–78	(Greece) Panionios On Telecoms

- Day 4 (November 13, 2008)

Team 1	Score	Team 2
Panionios On Telecoms (Greece)	72–67	(Serbia) Partizan

- Day 5 (November 27, 2008)

Team 1	Score	Team 2
Armani Jeans Milano (Italy)	77–73	(Greece) Panionios On Telecoms

- Day 6 (December 3, 2008)

Team 1	Score	Team 2
Panionios On Telecoms (Greece)	68–66	(Spain) Real Madrid

- Day 7 (December 10, 2008)

Team 1	Score	Team 2
CSKA Moscow (Russia)	93–61	(Greece) Panionios On Telecoms

- Day 8 (December 18, 2008)

Team 1	Score	Team 2
Panionios On Telecoms (Greece)	64–78	(Turkey) Efes Pilsen

- Day 9 (January 7, 2009)

Team 1	Score	Team 2
Partizan (Serbia)	80–57	(Greece) Panionios On Telecoms

- Day 10 (January 14, 2009)

Team 1	Score	Team 2
Panionios On Telecoms (Greece)	77–87	(Italy) Armani Jeans Milano

- Group D standings:

Pos.	Team	Pld.	W	L	PF	PA	PD	Tie-break
1.	(Russia) CSKA Moscow	10	7	3	774	644	+130	
2.	(Spain) Real Madrid	10	6	4	740	707	+33	
3.	(Italy) Armani Jeans Milano	10	5	5	734	745	-11	1–1 (+9)
4.	(Serbia) Partizan	10	5	5	706	687	+19	1–1 (-9)
5.	(Turkey) Efes Pilsen	10	4	6	713	762	-49	
6.	(Greece) Panionios On Telecoms	10	3	7	668	790	-122	

== 2010s ==
=== 2012–13 Eurocup Basketball, 2nd–tier ===
The 2012–13 Eurocup Basketball was the 11th installment of ULEB's 2nd-tier level European-wide professional club basketball competition EuroCup Basketball, running from November 7, 2012, to April 13, 2013. The trophy was won by Lokomotiv Kuban, who defeated Uxúe Bilbao Basket by a result of 75–64 at Spiroudome in Charleroi, Belgium. Overall, Panionios achieved in the present competition a record of 2 wins against 4 defeats, in only one round. More detailed:

==== Regular season ====
- Day 1 (November 7, 2012)

Team 1	Score	Team 2
Telenet Oostende (Belgium)	84–65	(Greece) Panionios

- Day 2 (November 14, 2012)

Team 1	Score	Team 2
Panionios (Greece)	70–76	(Poland) Stelmet Zielona Góra

- Day 3 (November 21, 2012)

Team 1	Score	Team 2
Panionios (Greece)	72–92	(Russia) UNICS

- Day 4 (November 28, 2012)

Team 1	Score	Team 2
UNICS (Russia)	82–73	(Greece) Panionios

- Day 5 (December 5, 2012)

Team 1	Score	Team 2
Panionios (Greece)	101–100*	(Belgium) Telenet Oostende

^{*}Overtime at the end of regulation (89–89).

- Day 6 (December 12, 2012)

Team 1	Score	Team 2
Stelmet Zielona Góra (Poland)	84–85	(Greece) Panionios

- Group F standings:

Pos.	Team	Pld.	W	L	PF	PA	PD	Tie-break
1.	(Russia) UNICS	6	5	1	481	442	+39	
2.	(Poland) Stelmet Zielona Góra	6	3	3	477	446	+31	
3.	(Belgium) Telenet Oostende	6	2	4	464	482	-18	1–1 (+18)
4.	(Greece) Panionios	6	2	4	466	518	-52	1–1 (-18)

=== 2013–14 Eurocup Basketball, 2nd–tier ===
The 2013–14 Eurocup Basketball was the 12th installment of ULEB's 2nd-tier level European-wide professional club basketball competition EuroCup Basketball, running from October 15, 2013, to May 7, 2014. The trophy was won by Valencia Basket, who defeated UNICS by a result of 165–140 in a two-legged final on a home and away basis. Overall, Panionios achieved in the present competition a record of 6 wins against 10 defeats, in two successive rounds. More detailed:

==== Regular season ====
- Day 1 (October 16, 2013)

Team 1	Score	Team 2
Panionios (Greece)	77–72	(Serbia) Radnički Kragujevac

- Day 2 (October 23, 2013)

Team 1	Score	Team 2
Spartak Saint Petersburg (Russia)	68–69	(Greece) Panionios

- Day 3 (October 30, 2013)

Team 1	Score	Team 2
Panionios (Greece)	86–91	(Lithuania) Neptūnas

- Day 4 (November 6, 2013)

Team 1	Score	Team 2
Beşiktaş Integral Forex (Turkey)	71–57	(Greece) Panionios

- Day 5 (November 13, 2013)

Team 1	Score	Team 2
Panionios (Greece)	74–62	(Finland) Nilan Bisons

- Day 6 (November 20, 2013)

Team 1	Score	Team 2
Radnički Kragujevac (Serbia)	84–77	(Greece) Panionios

- Day 7 (November 27, 2013)

Team 1	Score	Team 2
Panionios (Greece)	76–69	(Russia) Spartak Saint Petersburg

- Day 8 (December 4, 2013)

Team 1	Score	Team 2
Neptūnas (Lithuania)	78–86	(Greece) Panionios

- Day 9 (December 11, 2013)

Team 1	Score	Team 2
Panionios (Greece)	77–67	(Turkey) Beşiktaş Integral Forex

- Day 10 (December 18, 2013)

Team 1	Score	Team 2
Nilan Bisons (Finland)	93–89*	(Greece) Panionios

^{*}Overtime at the end of regulation (80–80).

- Eastern Conference Group H standings:

Pos.	Team	Pld.	W	L	PF	PA	PD	Tie-break
1.	(Turkey) Beşiktaş Integral Forex	10	7	3	717	690	+27	
2.	(Greece) Panionios	10	6	4	768	755	+13	
3.	(Serbia) Radnički Kragujevac	10	5	5	824	824	0	1–1 (+1)
4.	(Finland) Nilan Bisons	10	5	5	750	769	-19	1–1 (-1)
5.	(Lithuania) Neptūnas	10	4	6	814	807	+7	
6.	(Russia) Spartak Saint Petersburg	10	3	7	733	761	-28	

==== Top 32 ====
- Day 1 (January 8, 2014)

Team 1	Score	Team 2
Panionios (Greece)	75–89	(Russia) Nizhny Novgorod

- Day 2 (January 14, 2014)

Team 1	Score	Team 2
Bilbao Basket (Spain)	93–62	(Greece) Panionios

- Day 3 (January 22, 2014)

Team 1	Score	Team 2
Crvena zvezda Telekom (Serbia)	84–64	(Greece) Panionios

- Day 4 (January 29, 2014)

Team 1	Score	Team 2
Panionios (Greece)	66–78	(Serbia) Crvena zvezda Telekom

- Day 5 (February 12, 2014)

Team 1	Score	Team 2
Nizhny Novgorod (Russia)	80–67	(Greece) Panionios

- Day 6 (February 19, 2014)

Team 1	Score	Team 2
Panionios (Greece)	84–88	(Spain) Bilbao Basket

- Group L standings:

Pos.	Team	Pld.	W	L	PF	PA	PD
1.	(Russia) Nizhny Novgorod	6	5	1	468	436	+32
2.	(Serbia) Crvena zvezda Telekom	6	4	2	501	462	+39
3.	(Spain) Bilbao Basket	6	3	3	494	471	+23
4.	(Greece) Panionios	6	0	6	418	512	-94

== Record ==
Panionios B.C. has overall, from the 1975–76 season (first participation) to the 2013–14 season (last participation): 123 wins against 112 defeats, in 235 games, during play in all the European club competitions.

- (1st–tier) FIBA EuroLeague & EuroLeague: 7–19 in 26 games.
- (2nd–tier) FIBA European Cup & FIBA Saporta Cup: 16–14 in 30 games.
- (2nd–tier) EuroCup: 19–27 in 46 games.
- (3rd–tier) FIBA Korać Cup: 66–42 108 games.
- (3rd–tier) FIBA EuroCup: 9–6 in 15 games.
- (4th–tier) FIBA Europe Champions Cup: 6–4 in 10 games.

== See also ==
- Greek basketball clubs in international competitions
