= Fortitudo Pallacanestro Bologna in international competitions =

Fortitudo Pallacanestro Bologna history and statistics in FIBA Europe and Euroleague Basketball (company) competitions.

== European competitions ==
Record	Round	Opponent club					
1976–77 FIBA Korać Cup 3rd–tier
8–3	1st round	(Portugal) Sangalhos	97–68 (a)	108–41 (h)			
8–3	2nd round	(Greece) Panionios	96–72 (a)	89–58 (h)			
8–3	Top 12	(Israel) Hapoel Tel Aviv	98–85 (h)	82–81 (a)			
8–3	Top 12	(Socialist Federal Republic of Yugoslavia) Bosna	84–96 (a)	90–77 (h)			
8–3	SF	(France) Berck	81–68 (h)	88–95 (a)			
8–3	F	(Socialist Federal Republic of Yugoslavia) Jugoplastika	84–87; April 5, Palasport della Fiera, Genoa				
1981–82 FIBA Korać Cup 3rd–tier
5–5	1st round	(Greece) Iraklis	86–56 (h)	87–102 (a)			
5–5	2nd round	(Czechoslovakia) Zbrojovka Brno	104–86 (h)	59–60 (a)			
5–5	Top 16	(France) Tours	103–86 (h)	91–93 (a)			
5–5	Top 16	(Turkey) Efes Pilsen	89–84 (h)	92–99 (a)			
5–5	Top 16	(Socialist Federal Republic of Yugoslavia) Crvena zvezda	84–82 (h)	79–91 (a)			
1982–83 FIBA Korać Cup 3rd–tier
3–1	1st round	(Greece) AEK	89–72 (a)	68–60 (h)			
3–1	2nd round	(France) Monaco	73–65 (h)	62–72 (a)			
1994–95 FIBA Korać Cup 3rd–tier
7–3 +2 draws	2nd round	(Slovakia) Ozeta Trenčín	94–60 (a)	84–58 (h)			
7–3 +2 draws	3rd round	(Czech Republic) USK Praha	69–69 (a)	82–80 (h)			
7–3 +2 draws	Top 16	(Spain) TDK Manresa	76–72 (a)	89–81 (h)			
7–3 +2 draws	Top 16	(France) Pitch Cholet	79–83 (a)	82–70 (h)			
7–3 +2 draws	Top 16	(Turkey) Ülker	82–75 (h)	68–72 (a)			
7–3 +2 draws	QF	(Germany) Alba Berlin	73–77 (a)	80–80 (h)			
1995–96 FIBA Korać Cup 3rd–tier
11–3	2nd round	(Israel) Hapoel Holon	89–75 (a)	88–60 (h)			
11–3	3rd round	(Germany) UniVersa Bamberg	72–62 (a)	80–70 (h)			
11–3	Top 16	(Spain) Amway Zaragoza	77–76 (a)	82–81 (h)			
11–3	Top 16	(Germany) Alba Berlin	101–79 (h)	78–86 (a)			
11–3	Top 16	(Greece) Aris Moda Bagno	60–83 (a)	88–84 (h)			
11–3	QF	(Italy) Scavolini Pesaro	84–81 (a)	100–89 (h)			
11–3	SF	(Turkey) Efes Pilsen	78–102 (a)	97–91 (h)			
1996–97 FIBA EuroLeague 1st–tier
15–6	1st round	(Belgium) Spirou	87–78 (h)	78–61 (a)			
15–6	1st round	(Greece) Olympiacos	80–96 (a)	81–72 (h)			
15–6	1st round	(Spain) Estudiantes Argentaria	75–66 (a)	100–86 (h)			
15–6	1st round	(Germany) Alba Berlin	82–72 (h)	64–81 (a)			
15–6	1st round	(Croatia) Cibona	72–64 (a)	54–66 (h)			
15–6	2nd round	(Greece) Panionios Afisorama	88–72 (a)	94–58 (h)			
15–6	2nd round	(France) Limoges	90–76 (h)	70–81 (a)			
15–6	2nd round	(Turkey) Ülker	69–61 (h)	78–73 (a)			
15–6	Top 16	(Spain) Caja San Fernando	73–70 (h)	79–75 (a)	– (h)		
15–6	QF	(Spain) FC Barcelona	70–65 (h)	73–75 (a)	62–87 (h)		
1997–98 FIBA EuroLeague 1st–tier
12–9	1st round	(Germany) Alba Berlin	80–73 (h)	79–95 (a)			
12–9	1st round	(Croatia) Cibona	92–87 (a)	77–75 (h)			
12–9	1st round	(Greece) AEK	70–67 (h)	57–80 (a)			
12–9	1st round	(France) PSG Racing	93–77 (h)	60–84 (a)			
12–9	1st round	(Slovenia) Union Olimpija	68–89 (a)	77–61 (h)			
12–9	2nd round	(Turkey) Ülker	69–83 (a)	80–74 (h)			
12–9	2nd round	(Federal Republic of Yugoslavia) Partizan	85–82 (h)	66–76 (a)			
12–9	2nd round	(Israel) Hapoel Jerusalem	74–69 (a)	79–60 (h)			
12–9	Top 16	(Israel) Maccabi Tel Aviv	96–93 (h)	72–88 (a)	68–65 (h)		
12–9	QF	(Italy) Kinder Bologna	52–64 (a)	56–58 (h)	– (a)		
1998–99 FIBA EuroLeague 1st–tier
13–9	1st round	(Slovenia) Union Olimpija	45–57 (a)	63–66 (h)			
13–9	1st round	(Russia) CSK VVS Samara	77–58 (h)	71–59 (a)			
13–9	1st round	(France) ASVEL	66–71 (a)	84–61 (h)			
13–9	1st round	(Greece) PAOK	76–61 (h)	59–68 (a)			
13–9	1st round	(Spain) Real Madrid	66–73 (h)	69–65 (a)			
13–9	2nd round	(Russia) CSKA Moscow	83–69 (h)	67–69 (a)			
13–9	2nd round	(Italy) Kinder Bologna	74–72 (a)	67–65 (h)			
13–9	2nd round	(Greece) Olympiacos	60–63 (h)	73–62 (a)			
13–9	Top 16	(Greece) Panathinaikos	63–58 (a)	88–64 (h)	– (a)		
13–9	QF	(Spain) Real Madrid	90–63 (h)	76–65 (a)	– (h)		
13–9	SF	(Italy) Kinder Bologna	57–62; April 20, Olympiahalle, Munich				
13–9	3rd place game	(Greece) Olympiacos	63–74; April 22, Olympiahalle, Munich				
1999–00 FIBA EuroLeague 1st–tier
13–8	1st round	(Croatia) Cibona	92–78 (h)	61–71 (a)			
13–8	1st round	(Turkey) Efes Pilsen	76–56 (h)	63–99 (a)			
13–8	1st round	(Spain) Caja San Fernando	52–60 (a)	69–63 (h)			
13–8	1st round	(Federal Republic of Yugoslavia) Budućnost	83–75 (a)	72–73 (h)			
13–8	1st round	(France) Pau-Orthez	83–58 (h)	78–70 (a)			
13–8	2nd round	(Turkey) Ülker	68–76 (a)	79–53 (h)			
13–8	2nd round	(Slovenia) Pivovarna Laško	81–63 (h)	78–77 (a)			
13–8	2nd round	(Italy) Varese Roosters	72–91 (a)	91–82 (h)			
13–8	Top 16	(Italy) Benetton Treviso	82–73 (h)	77–61 (a)	– (h)		
13–8	QF	(Israel) Maccabi Tel Aviv	65–62 (a)	73–80 (h)	64–79 (a)		
2000–01 Euroleague 1st–tier
12–6	Regular season	(Lithuania) Žalgiris	91–85 (h)	56–73 (a)			
12–6	Regular season	(Croatia) Zadar	91–87 (a)	81–77 (h)			
12–6	Regular season	(Switzerland) Lugano Snakes	100–72 (a)	81–66 (h)			
12–6	Regular season	(Spain) Adecco Estudiantes	81–72 (h)	90–76 (a)			
12–6	Regular season	(Greece) Peristeri	70–83 (a)	71–69 (h)			
12–6	Top 16	(Croatia) Cibona	76–64 (h)	75–74 (a)	– (h)		
12–6	QF	(Spain) Real Madrid	74–68 (h)	57–88 (a)	88–70 (h)		
12–6	SF	(Italy) Kinder Bologna	76–103 (a)	84–92 (a)	70–74 (h)	– (h)	– (a)
2001–02 Euroleague 1st–tier
10–10	Regular season	(Greece) Panathinaikos	70–81 (a)	77–79 (h)			
10–10	Regular season	(Federal Republic of Yugoslavia) Budućnost	109–79 (h)	86–70 (a)			
10–10	Regular season	(Slovenia) Krka	100–94 (a)	73–88 (h)			
10–10	Regular season	(Croatia) Zadar	95–85 (h)	82–76 (a)			
10–10	Regular season	(Spain) Real Madrid	82–87 (a)	93–77 (h)			
10–10	Regular season	(France) Pau-Orthez	69–86 (a)	83–75 (h)			
10–10	Regular season	(Russia) CSKA Moscow	97–99 (h)	77–75 (a)			
10–10	Top 16	(Spain) FC Barcelona	97–93 (h)	59–77 (a)			
10–10	Top 16	(Italy) Benetton Treviso	90–96 (a)	73–86 (h)			
10–10	Top 16	(Italy) Scavolini Pesaro	73–86 (h)	90–71 (a)			
2002–03 Euroleague 1st–tier
11–9	Regular season	(Spain) FC Barcelona	75–94 (a)	82–70 (h)			
11–9	Regular season	(Germany) Alba Berlin	88–78 (h)	80–77 (a)			
11–9	Regular season	(Greece) AEK	82–76 (h)	72–63 (a)			
11–9	Regular season	(France) Pau-Orthez	71–76 (a)	85–75 (h)			
11–9	Regular season	(Turkey) Efes Pilsen	72–73 (h)	57–75 (a)			
11–9	Regular season	(Italy) Benetton Treviso	80–95 (a)	82–75 (h)			
11–9	Regular season	(Croatia) Cibona VIP	76–71 (h)	83–89 (a)			
11–9	Top 16	(Greece) Panathinaikos	67–81 (a)	88–63 (h)			
11–9	Top 16	(Turkey) Ülker	75–69 (a)	82–86 (h)			
11–9	Top 16	(Italy) Montepaschi Siena	70–85 (h)	68–64 (a)			
2003–04 Euroleague 1st–tier
14–8	Regular season	(Slovenia) Krka	97–86 (h)	66–58 (a)			
14–8	Regular season	(Greece) Panathinaikos	64–75 (a)	114–118 (h)			
14–8	Regular season	(Lithuania) Žalgiris	77–87 (a)	117–107 (h)			
14–8	Regular season	(Israel) Maccabi Tel Aviv	104–111 (h)	99–89 (a)			
14–8	Regular season	(Russia) CSKA Moscow	71–70 (a)	71–78 (h)			
14–8	Regular season	(Italy) Montepaschi Siena	95–86 (h)	69–76 (a)			
14–8	Regular season	(Spain) Unicaja	80–72 (a)	82–60 (h)			
14–8	Top 16	(Slovenia) Union Olimpija	84–76 (h)	86–73 (a)			
14–8	Top 16	(France) Pau-Orthez	87–81 (h)	81–80 (a)			
14–8	Top 16	(Turkey) Efes Pilsen	70–72 (a)	76–75 (h)			
14–8	SF	(Italy) Montepaschi Siena	103–102; April 29, Nokia Arena, Tel Aviv				
14–8	F	(Israel) Maccabi Tel Aviv	74–118; May 1, Nokia Arena, Tel Aviv				
2004–05 Euroleague 1st–tier
16–4	Regular season	(Greece) Olympiacos	76–71 (a)	94–77 (h)			
16–4	Regular season	(Turkey) Efes Pilsen	92–71 (h)	73–79 (a)			
16–4	Regular season	(Spain) Adecco Estudiantes	97–84 (a)	84–78 (h)			
16–4	Regular season	(Serbia and Montenegro) Partizan Pivara MB	103–91 (h)	88–85 (a)			
16–4	Regular season	(Croatia) Cibona VIP	99–88 (h)	96–89 (a)			
16–4	Regular season	(Poland) Prokom Trefl Sopot	68–78 (a)	71–63 (h)			
16–4	Regular season	(Spain) Real Madrid	77–70 (h)	81–79 (a)			
16–4	Top 16	(Spain) Tau Cerámica	84–94 (a)	86–79 (h)			
16–4	Top 16	(Greece) Panathinaikos	77–73 (h)	55–78 (a)			
16–4	Top 16	(Lithuania) Žalgiris	82–81 (a)	87–74 (h)			
2005–06 Euroleague 1st–tier
12–8	Regular season	(Spain) Tau Cerámica	69–77 (a)	86–66 (h)			
12–8	Regular season	(Greece) AEK	88–55 (h)	75–82 (a)			
12–8	Regular season	(Italy) Benetton Treviso	84–94 (a)	84–65 (h)			
12–8	Regular season	(Germany) GHP Bamberg	94–64 (h)	76–67 (a)			
12–8	Regular season	(France) SIG	78–75 (a)	71–47 (h)			
12–8	Regular season	(Slovenia) Union Olimpija	80–87 (a)	68–65 (h)			
12–8	Regular season	(Lithuania) Žalgiris	75–64 (h)	86–81 (a)			
12–8	Top 16	(Turkey) Ülker	87–69 (h)	80–84 (a)			
12–8	Top 16	(Spain) Real Madrid	76–92 (a)	66–61 (h)			
12–8	Top 16	(Israel) Maccabi Tel Aviv	84–89 (h)	76–82 (a)			
2006–07 Euroleague 1st–tier
5–9	Regular season	(France) Le Mans	71–82 (a)	83–71 (h)			
5–9	Regular season	(Greece) Olympiacos	86–93 (h)	67–94 (a)			
5–9	Regular season	(Russia) Dynamo Moscow	73–78 (a)	80–101 (h)			
5–9	Regular season	(Germany) RheinEnergie Köln	86–90 (h)	90–78 (a)			
5–9	Regular season	(Spain) Tau Cerámica	80–90 (a)	90–82 (h)			
5–9	Regular season	(Turkey) Efes Pilsen	74–72 (a)	74–76 (h)			
5–9	Regular season	(Poland) Prokom Trefl Sopot	77–91 (h)	84–78 (a)			
2007–08 ULEB Cup 2nd–tier
4–6	Regular season	(Russia) Dynamo Moscow	66–91 (a)	81–62 (h)			
4–6	Regular season	(Czech Republic) ČEZ Nymburk	82–71 (h)	70–82 (a)			
4–6	Regular season	(Belgium) Telindus Oostende	76–89 (h)	60–62 (a)			
4–6	Regular season	(Serbia) Crvena zvezda	66–99 (a)	76–77 (h)			
4–6	Regular season	(Greece) Panellinios	83–59 (h)	85–67 (a)			
2008–09 Eurocup 2nd–tier
2–4	Regular season	(Germany) Artland Dragons	78–87 (a)	89–93 (h)			
2–4	Regular season	(Spain) Pamesa Valencia	71–77 (h)	74–80 (a)			
2–4	Regular season	(Serbia) FMP	70–59 (a)	88–61 (h)			

== Record ==
Fortitudo Pallacanestro Bologna has overall from 1976-77 (first participation) to 2008-09 (last participation): 173 wins against 111 defeats plus 2 draws in 286 games for all the European club competitions.

- EuroLeague: 133–86 (219).
  - EuroCup Basketball: 6–10 (16).
    - FIBA Korać Cup: 34–15 plus 2 draws (51).
