= KK Bosna Royal in international competitions =

KK Bosna history and statistics in FIBA Europe and Euroleague Basketball (company) competitions.

== 1970s ==
=== 1974–75 FIBA Korać Cup, 3rd–tier ===
The 1974–75 FIBA Korać Cup was the 4th installment of the European 3rd-tier level professional basketball club competition FIBA Korać Cup, running from November 5, 1974, to March 25, 1975. The trophy was won by the title holder Birra Forst Cantù, who defeated CF Barcelona by a result of 181–154 in a two-legged final on a home and away basis. Overall, Bosna achieved in present competition a record of 5 wins against 5 defeats, in three successive rounds. More detailed:

==== First round ====
- Tie played on November 5, 1974, and on November 12, 1974.

Team 1	Agg.	Team 2	1st leg	2nd leg
Typsoos Lions (Netherlands)	163–201	(Socialist Federal Republic of Yugoslavia) Bosna	81–79	82–122

==== Second round ====
- Tie played on November 26, 1974, and on December 3, 1974.

Team 1	Agg.	Team 2	1st leg	2nd leg
PAOK (Greece)	150–157	(Socialist Federal Republic of Yugoslavia) Bosna	77–74	73–83

==== Top 16 ====
- Tie played on January 7, 1975, and on January 14, 1975.

Team 1	Agg.	Team 2	1st leg	2nd leg
IBP Stella Azzurra (Italy)	163–165	(Socialist Federal Republic of Yugoslavia) Bosna	94–73	69–92

- Tie played on January 21, 1975, and on January 28, 1975.

Team 1	Agg.	Team 2	1st leg	2nd leg
Olympique Antibes (France)	178–179	(Socialist Federal Republic of Yugoslavia) Bosna	108–87	70–92

- Tie played on February 5, 1975, and on February 12, 1975.

Team 1	Agg.	Team 2	1st leg	2nd leg
Bosna (Socialist Federal Republic of Yugoslavia)	147–153	(Spain) CF Barcelona	81–73	66–80

- Group D standings:

Pos.	Team	Pld.	Pts.	W	L	PF	PA	PD
1.	(Spain) CF Barcelona	3	6	3	0	527	473	+54
2.	(Socialist Federal Republic of Yugoslavia) Bosna	3	5	2	1	491	494	-3
3.	(Italy) IBP Stella Azzurra	3	4	1	2	482	490	-8
4.	(France) Olympique Antibes	3	3	0	3	510	553	-43

=== 1976–77 FIBA Korać Cup, 3rd–tier ===
The 1976–77 FIBA Korać Cup was the 6th installment of the European 3rd-tier level professional basketball club competition FIBA Korać Cup, running from October 19, 1976, to April 5, 1977. The trophy was won by Jugoplastika, who defeated Alco Bologna by a result of 87–84 at Palasport della Fiera in Genoa, Italy. Overall, Bosna achieved in present competition a record of 6 wins against 2 defeats, in three successive rounds. More detailed:

==== First round ====
- Tie played on October 19, 1976, and on October 26, 1976.

Team 1	Agg.	Team 2	1st leg	2nd leg
Iraklis (Greece)	147–187	(Socialist Federal Republic of Yugoslavia) Bosna	83–91	64–96

==== Second round ====
- Tie played on November 16, 1976, and on November 23, 1976.

Team 1	Agg.	Team 2	1st leg	2nd leg
CSKA Septemvriisko zname (Bulgaria)	195–202	(Socialist Federal Republic of Yugoslavia) Bosna	117–100	78–102

==== Top 12 ====
- Day 1 (January 11, 1977)

Team 1	Score	Team 2
Hapoel Tel Aviv (Israel)	93–107	(Socialist Federal Republic of Yugoslavia) Bosna

- Day 2 (January 18, 1977)

Bye

- Day 3 (January 25, 1977)

Team 1	Score	Team 2
Bosna (Socialist Federal Republic of Yugoslavia)	96–84	(Italy) Alco Bologna

- Day 4 (February 8, 1977)

Team 1	Score	Team 2
Bosna (Socialist Federal Republic of Yugoslavia)	108–102	(Israel) Hapoel Tel Aviv

- Day 5 (February 15, 1977)

Bye

- Day 6 (February 22, 1977)

Team 1	Score	Team 2
Alco Bologna (Italy)	90–77	(Socialist Federal Republic of Yugoslavia) Bosna

- Group B standings:

Pos.	Team	Pld.	Pts.	W	L	PF	PA	PD	Tie-break
1.	(Italy) Alco Bologna	4	7	3	1	354	339	+15	1–1 (+1)
2.	(Socialist Federal Republic of Yugoslavia) Bosna	4	7	3	1	388	369	+19	1–1 (-1)
3.	(Israel) Hapoel Tel Aviv	4	4	0	4	361	395	-34	

=== 1977–78 FIBA Korać Cup, 3rd–tier ===
The 1977–78 FIBA Korać Cup was the 7th installment of the European 3rd-tier level professional basketball club competition FIBA Korać Cup, running from November 15, 1977, to March 21, 1978. The trophy was won by Partizan, who defeated Bosna by a result of 117–110 (OT) at Sportska dvorana Borik in Banja Luka, Yugoslavia. Overall, Bosna achieved in present competition a record of 7 wins against 4 defeats, in four successive rounds. More detailed:

==== First round ====
- Tie played on November 15, 1977, and on November 22, 1977.

Team 1	Agg.	Team 2	1st leg	2nd leg
Bosna (Socialist Federal Republic of Yugoslavia)	4–0*	(Turkey) İTÜ	2–0	2–0

^{*}İTÜ withdrew before the first leg, and Bosna received a forfeit (2-0) in both games.

==== Top 16 ====
- Day 1 (December 13, 1977)

Team 1	Score	Team 2
Bosna (Socialist Federal Republic of Yugoslavia)	116–107	(France) Berck

- Day 2 (January 10, 1978)

Team 1	Score	Team 2
Inter Slovnaft (Czechoslovakia)	100–115	(Socialist Federal Republic of Yugoslavia) Bosna

- Day 3 (January 17, 1978)

Team 1	Score	Team 2
Bosna (Socialist Federal Republic of Yugoslavia)	116–91	(Italy) Scavolini Pesaro

- Day 4 (January 24, 1978)

Team 1	Score	Team 2
Berck (France)	94–87	(Socialist Federal Republic of Yugoslavia) Bosna

- Day 5 (January 31, 1978)

Team 1	Score	Team 2
Bosna (Socialist Federal Republic of Yugoslavia)	96–84	(Czechoslovakia) Inter Slovnaft

- Day 6 (February 7, 1978)

Team 1	Score	Team 2
Scavolini Pesaro (Italy)	96–89	(Socialist Federal Republic of Yugoslavia) Bosna

- Group B standings:

Pos.	Team	Pld.	Pts.	W	L	PF	PA	PD	Tie-break
1.	(Socialist Federal Republic of Yugoslavia) Bosna	6	10	4	2	619	572	+47	1–1 (+2)
2.	(France) Berck	6	10	4	2	580	566	+14	1–1 (-2)
3.	(Italy) Scavolini Pesaro	6	9	3	3	557	590	-33	
4.	(Czechoslovakia) Inter Slovnaft	6	7	1	5	558	586	-28	

==== Semifinals ====
- Tie played on February 28, 1978, and on March 9, 1978.

Team 1	Agg.	Team 2	1st leg	2nd leg
Cinzano Milano (Italy)	160–177	(Socialist Federal Republic of Yugoslavia) Bosna	79–76	81–101

==== Final ====
- March 21, 1978 at Sportska dvorana Borik in Banja Luka, Yugoslavia.

Team 1	Score	Team 2
Partizan (Socialist Federal Republic of Yugoslavia)	117–110*	(Socialist Federal Republic of Yugoslavia) Bosna

^{*}Overtime at the end of regulation (101–101).

=== 1978–79 FIBA European Champions Cup, 1st–tier ===
The 1978–79 FIBA European Champions Cup was the 22nd installment of the European top-tier level professional basketball club competition FIBA European Champions Cup (now called EuroLeague), running from November 2, 1978, to April 5, 1979. The trophy was won by Bosna, who defeated Emerson Varese by a result of 96–93 at Palais des Sports in Grenoble, France. Overall, Bosna achieved in the present competition a record of 13 wins against 4 defeats, in three successive rounds. More detailed:

==== First round ====
- Day 1 (November 2, 1978)

Team 1	Score	Team 2
Bosna (Socialist Federal Republic of Yugoslavia)	104–45	(Cyprus) AEL

- Day 2 (November 9, 1978)

Team 1	Score	Team 2
Bosna (Socialist Federal Republic of Yugoslavia)	99–64	(Albania) Partizani Tirana

- Day 3 (November 16, 1978)

Team 1	Score	Team 2
Zbrojovka Brno (Czechoslovakia)	90–89	(Socialist Federal Republic of Yugoslavia) Bosna

- Day 4 (November 23, 1978)

Team 1	Score	Team 2
AEL (Cyprus)	47–98	(Socialist Federal Republic of Yugoslavia) Bosna

- Day 5 (November 30, 1978)

Team 1	Score	Team 2
Partizani Tirana (Albania)	76–78	(Socialist Federal Republic of Yugoslavia) Bosna

- Day 6 (December 7, 1978)

Team 1	Score	Team 2
Bosna (Socialist Federal Republic of Yugoslavia)	105–97	(Czechoslovakia) Zbrojovka Brno

- Group E standings:

Pos.	Team	Pld.	Pts.	W	L	PF	PA	PD
1.	(Socialist Federal Republic of Yugoslavia) Bosna	6	11	5	1	573	419	+154
2.	(Czechoslovakia) Zbrojovka Brno	6	10	4	2	594	495	+99
3.	(Albania) Partizani Tirana	6	9	3	3	574	473	+101
4.	(Cyprus) AEL	6	6	0	6	323	677	-354

==== Semifinals ====
- Day 1 (January 10, 1979)

Team 1	Score	Team 2
Bosna (Socialist Federal Republic of Yugoslavia)	114–109*	(Spain) Real Madrid

^{*}Overtime at the end of regulation (100–100).

- Day 2 (January 18, 1979)

Team 1	Score	Team 2
Maccabi Tel Aviv (Israel)	97–70	(Socialist Federal Republic of Yugoslavia) Bosna

- Day 3 (January 25, 1979)

Team 1	Score	Team 2
Bosna (Socialist Federal Republic of Yugoslavia)	85–84	(Spain) Joventut Freixenet

- Day 4 (January 31, 1979)

Team 1	Score	Team 2
Emerson Varese (Italy)	92–73	(Socialist Federal Republic of Yugoslavia) Bosna

- Day 5 (February 7, 1979)

Team 1	Score	Team 2
Bosna (Socialist Federal Republic of Yugoslavia)	72–69	(Greece) Olympiacos

- Day 6 (February 15, 1979)

Team 1	Score	Team 2
Real Madrid (Spain)	95–89	(Socialist Federal Republic of Yugoslavia) Bosna

- Day 7 (March 1, 1979)

Team 1	Score	Team 2
Bosna (Socialist Federal Republic of Yugoslavia)	101–87	(Israel) Maccabi Tel Aviv

- Day 8 (March 8, 1979)

Team 1	Score	Team 2
Joventut Freixenet (Spain)	94–98	(Socialist Federal Republic of Yugoslavia) Bosna

- Day 9 (March 15, 1979)

Team 1	Score	Team 2
Bosna (Socialist Federal Republic of Yugoslavia)	104–85	(Italy) Emerson Varese

- Day 10 (March 21, 1979)

Team 1	Score	Team 2
Olympiacos (Greece)	83–88	(Socialist Federal Republic of Yugoslavia) Bosna

- Semifinals group stage standings:

Pos.	Team	Pld.	Pts.	W	L	PF	PA	PD	Tie-break
1.	(Italy) Emerson Varese	10	17	7	3	819	763	+56	1–1 (0)
2.	(Socialist Federal Republic of Yugoslavia) Bosna	10	17	7	3	894	895	-1	1–1 (0)
3.	(Israel) Maccabi Tel Aviv	10	16	6	4	839	779	+60	1–1 (+9)
4.	(Spain) Real Madrid	10	16	6	4	976	910	+66	1–1 (-9)
5.	(Spain) Joventut Freixenet	10	13	3	7	860	892	-32	
6.	(Greece) Olympiacos	10	11	1	9	747	896	-149	

==== Final ====
- April 5, 1979 at Palais des Sports in Grenoble, France.

Team 1	Score	Team 2
Emerson Varese (Italy)	93–96	(Socialist Federal Republic of Yugoslavia) Bosna

== 1980s ==
=== 1979–80 FIBA European Champions Cup, 1st–tier ===
The 1979–80 FIBA European Champions Cup was the 23rd installment of the European top-tier level professional basketball club competition FIBA European Champions Cup (now called EuroLeague), running from November 11, 1979, to March 27, 1980. The trophy was won by Real Madrid, who defeated Maccabi Tel Aviv by a result of 89–85 at Deutschlandhalle in West Berlin, West Germany. Overall, Bosna achieved in the present competition a record of 9 wins against 5 defeats, in two successive rounds. More detailed:

==== First round ====
- Day 1 (October 11, 1979)

Bye

- Day 2 (October 18, 1979)

Team 1	Score	Team 2
Bosna (Socialist Federal Republic of Yugoslavia)	110–70	(Egypt) Al-Zamalek

- Day 3 (November 1, 1979)

Team 1	Score	Team 2
Levski-Spartak (Bulgaria)	92–85	(Socialist Federal Republic of Yugoslavia) Bosna

- Day 4 (November 8, 1979)

Bye

- Day 5 (November 22, 1979)

Team 1	Score	Team 2
Al-Zamalek (Egypt)	84–92	(Socialist Federal Republic of Yugoslavia) Bosna

- Day 6 (November 29, 1979)

Team 1	Score	Team 2
Bosna (Socialist Federal Republic of Yugoslavia)	100–89	(Bulgaria) Levski-Spartak

- Group A standings:

Pos.	Team	Pld.	Pts.	W	L	PF	PA	PD	Tie-break
1.	(Socialist Federal Republic of Yugoslavia) Bosna	4	7	3	1	387	335	+52	1–1 (+4)
2.	(Bulgaria) Levski-Spartak	4	7	3	1	374	340	+34	1–1 (-4)
3.	(Egypt) Al-Zamalek	4	4	0	4	309	395	-86	

==== Semifinals ====
- Day 1 (December 13, 1979)

Team 1	Score	Team 2
Partizan (Socialist Federal Republic of Yugoslavia)	96–93	(Socialist Federal Republic of Yugoslavia) Bosna

- Day 2 (December 20, 1979)

Team 1	Score	Team 2
Bosna (Socialist Federal Republic of Yugoslavia)	84–79	(Israel) Maccabi Tel Aviv

- Day 3 (January 10, 1980)

Team 1	Score	Team 2
Bosna (Socialist Federal Republic of Yugoslavia)	98–96	(Spain) Real Madrid

- Day 4 (January 17, 1980)

Team 1	Score	Team 2
Nashua EBBC (Netherlands)	76–78	(Socialist Federal Republic of Yugoslavia) Bosna

- Day 5 (January 24, 1980)

Team 1	Score	Team 2
Sinudyne Bologna (Italy)	79–76	(Socialist Federal Republic of Yugoslavia) Bosna

- Day 6 (January 31, 1980)

Team 1	Score	Team 2
Bosna (Socialist Federal Republic of Yugoslavia)	93–86	(Socialist Federal Republic of Yugoslavia) Partizan

- Day 7 (February 14, 1980)

Team 1	Score	Team 2
Maccabi Tel Aviv (Israel)	84–69	(Socialist Federal Republic of Yugoslavia) Bosna

- Day 8 (February 21, 1980)

Team 1	Score	Team 2
Real Madrid (Spain)	95–93	(Socialist Federal Republic of Yugoslavia) Bosna

- Day 9 (March 5, 1980)

Team 1	Score	Team 2
Bosna (Socialist Federal Republic of Yugoslavia)	95–91	(Netherlands) Nashua EBBC

- Day 10 (March 13, 1980)

Team 1	Score	Team 2
Bosna (Socialist Federal Republic of Yugoslavia)	89–85	(Italy) Sinudyne Bologna

- Semifinals group stage standings:

Pos.	Team	Pld.	Pts.	W	L	PF	PA	PD	Tie-break
1.	(Israel) Maccabi Tel Aviv	10	17	7	3	878	814	+64	1–1 (+9)
2.	(Spain) Real Madrid	10	17	7	3	950	888	+62	1–1 (-9)
3.	(Socialist Federal Republic of Yugoslavia) Bosna	10	16	6	4	868	867	+1	
4.	(Italy) Sinudyne Bologna	10	15	5	5	831	841	-10	
5.	(Netherlands) Nashua EBBC	10	14	4	6	786	775	+11	
6.	(Socialist Federal Republic of Yugoslavia) Partizan	10	11	1	9	810	938	-128	

=== 1980–81 FIBA European Champions Cup, 1st–tier ===
The 1980–81 FIBA European Champions Cup was the 24th installment of the European top-tier level professional basketball club competition FIBA European Champions Cup (now called EuroLeague), running from October 9, 1980, to March 26, 1981. The trophy was won by Maccabi Tel Aviv, who defeated Sinudyne Bologna by a result of 80–79 at Hall Rhénus in Strasbourg, France. Overall, Bosna achieved in the present competition a record of 9 wins against 7 defeats, in two successive rounds. More detailed:

==== First round ====
- Day 1 (October 9, 1980)

Team 1	Score	Team 2
Stevnsgade (Denmark)	68–121	(Socialist Federal Republic of Yugoslavia) Bosna

- Day 2 (October 16, 1980)

Team 1	Score	Team 2
Bosna (Socialist Federal Republic of Yugoslavia)	106–82	(Hungary) Budapesti Honvéd

- Day 3 (October 30, 1980)

Team 1	Score	Team 2
UBSC Wien (Austria)	85–92	(Socialist Federal Republic of Yugoslavia) Bosna

- Day 4 (November 6, 1980)

Team 1	Score	Team 2
Bosna (Socialist Federal Republic of Yugoslavia)	97–44	(Denmark) Stevnsgade

- Day 5 (November 13, 1980)

Team 1	Score	Team 2
Budapesti Honvéd (Hungary)	102–92	(Socialist Federal Republic of Yugoslavia) Bosna

- Day 6 (November 20, 1980)

Team 1	Score	Team 2
Bosna (Socialist Federal Republic of Yugoslavia)	106–94	(Austria) UBSC Wien

- Group C standings:

Pos.	Team	Pld.	Pts.	W	L	PF	PA	PD
1.	(Socialist Federal Republic of Yugoslavia) Bosna	6	11	5	1	614	475	+139
2.	(Hungary) Budapesti Honvéd	6	10	4	2	587	517	+70
3.	(Austria) UBSC Wien	6	9	3	3	558	501	+57
4.	(Denmark) Stevnsgade	6	6	0	6	382	648	-266

==== Semifinals ====
- Day 1 (December 10, 1980)

Team 1	Score	Team 2
Nashua EBBC (Netherlands)	101–87	(Socialist Federal Republic of Yugoslavia) Bosna

- Day 2 (December 18, 1980)

Team 1	Score	Team 2
Bosna (Socialist Federal Republic of Yugoslavia)	93–87	(Soviet Union) CSKA Moscow

- Day 3 (January 15, 1981)

Team 1	Score	Team 2
Sinudyne Bologna (Italy)	92–85	(Socialist Federal Republic of Yugoslavia) Bosna

- Day 4 (January 22, 1981)

Team 1	Score	Team 2
Bosna (Socialist Federal Republic of Yugoslavia)	86–97	(Israel) Maccabi Tel Aviv

- Day 5 (January 29, 1981)

Team 1	Score	Team 2
Bosna (Socialist Federal Republic of Yugoslavia)	90–79	(Spain) Real Madrid

- Day 6 (February 5, 1981)

Team 1	Score	Team 2
Bosna (Socialist Federal Republic of Yugoslavia)	104–90	(Netherlands) Nashua EBBC

- Day 7 (February 19, 1981)

Team 1	Score	Team 2
CSKA Moscow (Soviet Union)	93–83	(Socialist Federal Republic of Yugoslavia) Bosna

- Day 8 (February 26, 1981)

Team 1	Score	Team 2
Bosna (Socialist Federal Republic of Yugoslavia)	101–105*	(Italy) Sinudyne Bologna

^{*}Overtime at the end of regulation (99–99).

- Day 9 (March 5, 1981)

Team 1	Score	Team 2
Maccabi Tel Aviv (Israel)	107–100	(Socialist Federal Republic of Yugoslavia) Bosna

- Day 10 (March 12, 1981)

Team 1	Score	Team 2
Real Madrid (Spain)	95–97	(Socialist Federal Republic of Yugoslavia) Bosna

- Semifinals group stage standings:

Pos.	Team	Pld.	Pts.	W	L	PF	PA	PD	Tie-break
1.	(Italy) Sinudyne Bologna	10	17	7	3	864	837	+27	
2.	(Israel) Maccabi Tel Aviv	10	16	6	4	903	880	+23	
3.	(Netherlands) Nashua EBBC	10	15	5	5	902	901	+1	
4.	(Socialist Federal Republic of Yugoslavia) Bosna	10	14	4	6	926	946	-20	3–1
5.	(Soviet Union) CSKA Moscow	10	14	4	6	813	861	-48	2–2
6.	(Spain) Real Madrid	10	14	4	6	912	895	+17	1–3

=== 1983–84 FIBA European Champions Cup, 1st–tier ===
The 1983–84 FIBA European Champions Cup was the 27th installment of the European top-tier level professional basketball club competition FIBA European Champions Cup (now called EuroLeague), running from September 15, 1983, to March 29, 1984. The trophy was won by Banco di Roma, who defeated FC Barcelona by a result of 79–73 at Patinoire des Vernets in Geneva, Switzerland. Overall, Bosna achieved in the present competition a record of 9 wins against 5 defeats, in four successive rounds. More detailed:

==== First round ====
- Bye

==== Second round ====
- Tie played on September 29, 1983, and on October 6, 1983.

Team 1	Agg.	Team 2	1st leg	2nd leg
Klosterneuburg (Austria)	151–168	(Socialist Federal Republic of Yugoslavia) Bosna	76–77	75–91

==== Top 12 ====
- Tie played on October 27, 1983, and on November 3, 1983.

Team 1	Agg.	Team 2	1st leg	2nd leg
Austin Rover Sunderland (England)	171–177	(Socialist Federal Republic of Yugoslavia) Bosna	89–93	82–84

==== Semifinals ====
- Day 1 (December 8, 1983)

Team 1	Score	Team 2
FC Barcelona (Spain)	102–83	(Socialist Federal Republic of Yugoslavia) Bosna

- Day 2 (December 15, 1983)

Team 1	Score	Team 2
Bosna (Socialist Federal Republic of Yugoslavia)	88–84	(Italy) Jollycolombani Cantù

- Day 3 (January 12, 1984)

Team 1	Score	Team 2
Maccabi Tel Aviv (Israel)	112–80	(Socialist Federal Republic of Yugoslavia) Bosna

- Day 4 (January 18, 1984)

Team 1	Score	Team 2
Bosna (Socialist Federal Republic of Yugoslavia)	104–96	(France) Limoges CSP

- Day 5 (January 26, 1984)

Team 1	Score	Team 2
Bosna (Socialist Federal Republic of Yugoslavia)	86–77	(Italy) Banco di Roma

- Day 6 (February 2, 1984)

Team 1	Score	Team 2
Bosna (Socialist Federal Republic of Yugoslavia)	96–90	(Spain) FC Barcelona

- Day 7 (February 16, 1984)

Team 1	Score	Team 2
Jollycolombani Cantù (Italy)	109–73	(Socialist Federal Republic of Yugoslavia) Bosna

- Day 8 (February 23, 1984)

Team 1	Score	Team 2
Bosna (Socialist Federal Republic of Yugoslavia)	90–85	(Israel) Maccabi Tel Aviv

- Day 9 (February 29, 1984)

Team 1	Score	Team 2
Limoges CSP (France)	107–88	(Socialist Federal Republic of Yugoslavia) Bosna

- Day 10 (March 8, 1984)

Team 1	Score	Team 2
Banco di Roma (Italy)	66–55	(Socialist Federal Republic of Yugoslavia) Bosna

- Semifinals group stage standings:

Pos.	Team	Pld.	Pts.	W	L	PF	PA	PD	Tie-break
1.	(Spain) FC Barcelona	10	17	7	3	910	825	+85	1–1 (+4)
2.	(Italy) Banco di Roma	10	17	7	3	785	+752	+33	1–1 (-4)
3.	(Italy) Jollycolombani Cantù	10	16	6	4	865	826	+39	
4.	(Socialist Federal Republic of Yugoslavia) Bosna	10	15	5	5	843	928	-85	
5.	(Israel) Maccabi Tel Aviv	10	13	3	7	872	902	-30	
6.	(France) Limoges CSP	10	12	2	8	937	979	-42	

=== 1984–85 FIBA European Cup Winners' Cup, 2nd–tier ===
The 1984–85 FIBA European Cup Winners' Cup was the 19th installment of FIBA's 2nd-tier level European-wide professional club basketball competition FIBA European Cup Winners' Cup (lately called FIBA Saporta Cup), running from October 2, 1984, to March 19, 1985. The trophy was won by FC Barcelona, who defeated Žalgiris by a result of 77–73 at Palais des Sports in Grenoble, France. Overall, Bosna achieved in the present competition a record of 1 win against 1 defeat, in two successive rounds. More detailed:

==== First round ====
- Bye

==== Top 16 ====
- Tie played on October 30, 1984, and on November 6, 1984.

Team 1	Agg.	Team 2	1st leg	2nd leg
PAOK (Greece)	170–168	(Socialist Federal Republic of Yugoslavia) Bosna	88–84	82–84

=== 1985–86 FIBA Korać Cup, 3rd–tier ===
The 1985–86 FIBA Korać Cup was the 15th installment of the European 3rd-tier level professional basketball club competition FIBA Korać Cup, running from October 2, 1985, to March 27, 1986. The trophy was won by Banco di Roma, who defeated Mobilgirgi Caserta by a result of 157–150 in a two-legged final on a home and away basis. Overall, Bosna achieved in present competition a record of 3 wins against 3 defeats, in three successive rounds.

==== First round ====
- Bye

==== Second round ====
- Bye

==== Top 16 ====
- Day 1 (December 4, 1985)

Team 1	Score	Team 2
ESM Challans (France)	106–95*	(Socialist Federal Republic of Yugoslavia) Bosna

^{*}Overtime at the end of regulation (84–84).

- Day 2 (December 11, 1985)

Team 1	Score	Team 2
Banco di Roma (Italy)	91–77	(Socialist Federal Republic of Yugoslavia) Bosna

- Day 3 (January 8, 1986)

Team 1	Score	Team 2
Bosna (Socialist Federal Republic of Yugoslavia)	105–89	(Israel) Hapoel Tel Aviv

- Day 4 (January 15, 1986)

Team 1	Score	Team 2
Bosna (Socialist Federal Republic of Yugoslavia)	97–92	(France) ESM Challans

- Day 5 (January 22, 1986)

Team 1	Score	Team 2
Bosna (Socialist Federal Republic of Yugoslavia)	100–96	(Italy) Banco di Roma

- Day 6 (January 29, 1986)

Team 1	Score	Team 2
Hapoel Tel Aviv (Israel)	110–107	(Socialist Federal Republic of Yugoslavia) Bosna

- Group C standings:

Pos.	Team	Pld.	Pts.	W	L	PF	PA	PD	Tie-break
1.	(Italy) Banco di Roma	6	10	4	2	547	500	+47	1–1 (+9)
2.	(Israel) Hapoel Tel Aviv	6	10	4	2	531	546	-15	1–1 (-9)
3.	(Socialist Federal Republic of Yugoslavia) Bosna	6	9	3	3	581	584	-3	
4.	(France) ESM Challans	6	7	1	5	514	543	-29	

== 1990s ==
=== 1989–90 FIBA Korać Cup, 3rd–tier ===
The 1989–90 FIBA Korać Cup was the 19th installment of the European 3rd-tier level professional basketball club competition FIBA Korać Cup, running from September 27, 1989, to March 28, 1990. The trophy was won by Ram Joventut, who defeated Scavolini Pesaro by a result of 195–184 in a two-legged final on a home and away basis. Overall, Bosna achieved in present competition a record of 10 wins against 3 defeats plus 1 draw, in five successive rounds. More detailed:

==== First round ====
- Tie played on September 27, 1989, and on October 4, 1989.

Team 1	Agg.	Team 2	1st leg	2nd leg
Fenerbahçe (Turkey)	154–178	(Socialist Federal Republic of Yugoslavia) Bosna	86–92	68–86

==== Second round ====
- Tie played on October 25, 1989, and on November 1, 1989.

Team 1	Agg.	Team 2	1st leg	2nd leg
Bobcat Gent (Belgium)	156–211	(Socialist Federal Republic of Yugoslavia) Bosna	78–100	78–111

==== Top 16 ====
- Day 1 (December 6, 1989)

Team 1	Score	Team 2
Bosna (Socialist Federal Republic of Yugoslavia)	105–97	(Greece) Iraklis

- Day 2 (December 13, 1989)

Team 1	Score	Team 2
Phonola Caserta (Italy)	82–77	(Socialist Federal Republic of Yugoslavia) Bosna

- Day 3 (January 17, 1990)

Team 1	Score	Team 2
Bosna (Socialist Federal Republic of Yugoslavia)	92–89*	(Soviet Union) CSKA Moscow

^{*}Overtime at the end of regulation (80–80).

- Day 4 (January 24, 1990)

Team 1	Score	Team 2
Iraklis (Greece)	87–105	(Socialist Federal Republic of Yugoslavia) Bosna

- Day 5 (January 31, 1990)

Team 1	Score	Team 2
Bosna (Socialist Federal Republic of Yugoslavia)	96–84	(Italy) Phonola Caserta

- Day 6 (February 7, 1990)

Team 1	Score	Team 2
CSKA Moscow (Soviet Union)	80–69	(Socialist Federal Republic of Yugoslavia) Bosna

- Group A standings:

Pos.	Team	Pld.	Pts.	W	L	PF	PA	PD	Tie-break
1.	(Soviet Union) CSKA Moscow	6	10	4	2	514	477	+37	2–2 (+11)
2.	(Socialist Federal Republic of Yugoslavia) Bosna	6	10	4	2	544	519	+25	2–2 (-1)
3.	(Italy) Phonola Caserta	6	10	4	2	492	475	+17	2–2 (-10)
4.	(Greece) Iraklis	6	6	0	6	485	564	-79	

==== Quarterfinals ====
- Tie played on February 21, 1990, and on February 28, 1990.

Team 1	Agg.	Team 2	1st leg	2nd leg
Efes Pilsen (Turkey)	169–224	(Socialist Federal Republic of Yugoslavia) Bosna	91–107	78–117

==== Semifinals ====
- Tie played on March 7, 1990, and on March 15, 1990.

Team 1	Agg.	Team 2	1st leg	2nd leg
Bosna (Socialist Federal Republic of Yugoslavia)	162–184	(Spain) Ram Joventut	90–90	72–94

=== 1991–92 FIBA Korać Cup, 3rd–tier ===
The 1991–92 FIBA Korać Cup was the 21st installment of the European 3rd-tier level professional basketball club competition FIBA Korać Cup, running from October 2, 1991, to March 18, 1992. The trophy was won by il Messaggero Roma, who defeated Scavolini Pesaro by a result of 193–180 in a two-legged final on a home and away basis. Overall, Bosna achieved in present competition a record of 2 wins against 1 defeat plus 1 draw, in two successive rounds. More detailed:

==== First round ====
- Tie played on October 2, 1991, and on October 3, 1991.

Team 1	Agg.	Team 2	1st leg	2nd leg
AEL (Cyprus)	173–232	(Federal Republic of Yugoslavia) Bosna	83–107	90–125

==== Second round ====
- Tie played on October 30, 1991, and on November 6, 1991.

Team 1	Agg.	Team 2	1st leg	2nd leg
Bosna (Federal Republic of Yugoslavia)	165–169	(Greece) Nikas Peristeri	84–84	81–85

=== 1995–96 FIBA Korać Cup, 3rd–tier ===
The 1995–96 FIBA Korać Cup was the 25th installment of the European 3rd-tier level professional basketball club competition FIBA Korać Cup, running from September 6, 1995, to March 13, 1996. The trophy was won by Efes Pilsen, who defeated Stefanel Milano by a result of 146–145 in a two-legged final on a home and away basis. Overall, Bosna achieved in present competition a record of 0 wins against 2 defeats, in only one rounds. More detailed:

==== First round ====
- Tie played on September 6, 1995, and on September 13, 1995.

Team 1	Agg.	Team 2	1st leg	2nd leg
Bosna (Bosnia and Herzegovina)	0–40*	Croatia Osiguranje	0–20	0–20

^{*}Bosna withdrew before the first leg and Croatia Osiguranje received a forfeit (20-0) in both games.

=== 1998–99 FIBA Saporta Cup, 2nd–tier ===
The 1998–99 FIBA Saporta Cup was the 33rd installment of FIBA's 2nd-tier level European-wide professional club basketball competition FIBA Saporta Cup, running from September 22, 1998, to April 13, 1999. The trophy was won by Benetton Treviso, who defeated Pamesa Valencia by a result of 64–60 at Pabellón Príncipe Felipe in Zaragoza, Spain. Overall, Bosna achieved in the present competition a record of 1 win against 9 defeats, in only one round. More detailed:

==== First round ====
- Day 1 (September 22, 1998)

Team 1	Score	Team 2
Spirou (Belgium)	65–63	(Bosnia and Herzegovina) Bosna

- Day 2, (September 30, 1998)

Team 1	Score	Team 2
Bosna (Bosnia and Herzegovina)	50–71	(Turkey) Tofaş

- Day 3 (October 7, 1998)

Team 1	Score	Team 2
Bosna (Bosnia and Herzegovina)	59–61	(Israel) Hapoel Jerusalem

- Day 4 (October 13, 1998)

Team 1	Score	Team 2
Marc Körmend (Hungary)	76–69	(Bosnia and Herzegovina) Bosna

- Day 5 (October 20, 1998)

Team 1	Score	Team 2
Lietuvos rytas (Lithuania)	85–84	(Bosnia and Herzegovina) Bosna

- Day 6 (November 3, 1998)

Team 1	Score	Team 2
Bosna (Bosnia and Herzegovina)	65–72	(Belgium) Spirou

- Day 7 (November 12, 1998)

Team 1	Score	Team 2
Tofaş (Turkey)	72–60	(Bosnia and Herzegovina) Bosna

- Day 8 (November 17, 1998)

Team 1	Score	Team 2
Hapoel Jerusalem (Israel)	78–67	(Bosnia and Herzegovina) Bosna

- Day 9 (December 8, 1998)

Team 1	Score	Team 2
Bosna (Bosnia and Herzegovina)	83–63	(Hungary) Marc Körmend

- Day 10 (December 15, 1998)

Team 1	Score	Team 2
Bosna (Bosnia and Herzegovina)	72–77	(Lithuania) Lietuvos rytas

- Group E standings:

Pos.	Team	Pld.	Pts.	W	L	PF	PA	PD	Tie-break
1.	(Turkey) Tofaş	10	17	7	3	774	650	+124	2–2 (+43)
2.	(Israel) Hapoel Jerusalem	10	17	7	3	770	707	+63	2–2 (+1)
3.	(Belgium) Spirou	10	17	7	3	680	682	-2	2–2 (-44)
4.	(Lithuania) Lietuvos rytas	10	16	6	4	757	776	-19	
5.	(Hungary) Marc Körmend	10	12	2	8	723	841	-118	
6.	(Bosnia and Herzegovina) Bosna	10	11	1	9	672	720	-48	

== 2000s ==
=== 1999–2000 FIBA Saporta Cup ===
==== First round ====
- Day 1 (September 21, 1999)

Team 1	Score	Team 2
Bosna (Bosnia and Herzegovina)	60–100	(Spain) Tau Cerámica

- Day 2 (September 28, 1999)

Team 1	Score	Team 2
Illiabum Clube (Portugal)	75–79	(Bosnia and Herzegovina) Bosna

- Day 3 (October 5, 1999)

Team 1	Score	Team 2
Bosna (Bosnia and Herzegovina)	59–52	(North Macedonia) Godel Rabotnički

- Day 4 (October 12, 1999)

Team 1	Score	Team 2
Hoop Pekaes (Poland)	73–52	(Bosnia and Herzegovina) Bosna

- Day 5 (October 19, 1999)

Team 1	Score	Team 2
Bosna (Bosnia and Herzegovina)	43–66	(France) PSG Racing

- Day 6 (November 2, 1999)

Team 1	Score	Team 2
Tau Cerámica (Spain)	80–67	(Bosnia and Herzegovina) Bosna

- Day 7 (November 9, 1999)

Team 1	Score	Team 2
Bosna (Bosnia and Herzegovina)	84–71	(Portugal) Illiabum Clube

- Day 8 (November 16, 1999)

Team 1	Score	Team 2
Godel Rabotnički (North Macedonia)	51–82	(Bosnia and Herzegovina) Bosna

- Day 9 (December 7, 1999)

Team 1	Score	Team 2
Bosna (Bosnia and Herzegovina)	66–78	(Poland) Hoop Pekaes

- Day 10 (December 14, 1999)

Team 1	Score	Team 2
PSG Racing (France)	68–52	(Bosnia and Herzegovina) Bosna

- Group D standings:

Pos.	Team	Pld.	Pts.	W	L	PF	PA	PD	Tie-break
1.	(France) PSG Racing	10	19	9	1	771	600	+171	
2.	(Poland) Hoop Pekaes	10	18	8	2	760	668	+92	
3.	(Spain) Tau Cerámica	10	17	7	3	808	659	+149	
4.	(Bosnia and Herzegovina) Bosna	10	14	4	6	644	714	-70	
5.	(Portugal) Illiabum Clube	10	11	1	9	692	855	-163	1–1 (+7)
6.	(North Macedonia) Godel Rabotnički	10	11	1	9	550	729	-179	1–1 (-7)

==== Second round ====
- Tie played on January 11, 2000, and on January 18, 2000.

Team 1	Agg.	Team 2	1st leg	2nd leg
Bosna (Bosnia and Herzegovina)	138–174	(Lithuania) Lietuvos rytas	65–71	73–103

=== 2007–08 ULEB Cup ===
==== Regular season ====
- Day 1 (November 6, 2007)

Team 1	Score	Team 2
Bosna (Bosnia and Herzegovina)	84–68	(England) Guildford Heat

- Day 2 (November 13, 2007)

Team 1	Score	Team 2
Türk Telekom (Turkey)	95–82	(Bosnia and Herzegovina) Bosna

- Day 3 (November 20, 2007)

Team 1	Score	Team 2
Šiauliai (Lithuania)	85–76	(Bosnia and Herzegovina) Bosna

- Day 4 (November 27, 2007)

Team 1	Score	Team 2
Bosna (Bosnia and Herzegovina)	68–85	(Spain) DKV Joventut

- Day 5 (December 4, 2007)

Team 1	Score	Team 2
Alba Berlin (Germany)	141–127*	(Bosnia and Herzegovina) Bosna

^{*}Longest game in the history of European competitions. Five overtimes at the end of regulation (71–71, 82–82, 97–97, 111–111 and 122–122).

- Day 6 (December 11, 2007)

Team 1	Score	Team 2
Guildford Heat (England)	85–98	(Bosnia and Herzegovina) Bosna

- Day 7 (December 18, 2007)

Team 1	Score	Team 2
Bosna (Bosnia and Herzegovina)	80–85	(Turkey) Türk Telekom

- Day 8 (January 9, 2008)

Team 1	Score	Team 2
Bosna (Bosnia and Herzegovina)	88–77	(Lithuania) Šiauliai

- Day 9 (January 15, 2008)

Team 1	Score	Team 2
DKV Joventut (Spain)	83–66	(Bosnia and Herzegovina) Bosna

- Day 10 (January 22, 2008)

Team 1	Score	Team 2
Bosna (Bosnia and Herzegovina)	91–76	(Germany) Alba Berlin

- Group A standings:

Pos.	Team	Pld.	W	L	PF	PA	PD	Tie-break
1.	(Spain) DKV Joventut	10	9	1	913	675	+238	1–1 (+17)
2.	(Turkey) Türk Telekom	10	9	1	920	831	+89	1–1 (-17)
3.	(Bosnia and Herzegovina) Bosna	10	4	6	860	880	-20	2–2 (+3)
4.	(Lithuania) Šiauliai	10	4	6	781	826	-45	2–2 (+3)
5.	(Germany) Alba Berlin	10	4	6	790	815	-25	2–2 (-6)
6.	(England) Guildford Heat	10	0	10	689	926	-237	

==== Top 32 ====
- Tie played on February 19, 2008, and on February 26, 2008.

Team 1	Agg.	Team 2	1st leg	2nd leg
Bosna (Bosnia and Herzegovina)	158–171	(Spain) Kalise Gran Canaria	89–82	69–89

== 2010s ==
=== 2010–11 FIBA EuroChallenge ===
==== First round ====
- Tie played on September 29, 2010, and on October 5, 2010.

Team 1	Agg.	Team 2	1st leg	2nd leg
Bosna Asa (Bosnia and Herzegovina)	132–167	(France) SLUC Nancy	74–91	58–76

=== 2017–18 Basketball Champions League ===
==== First round ====
- Tie played on September 19, 2017, and on September 21, 2017.

Team 1	Agg.	Team 2	1st leg	2nd leg
Bosna Royal (Bosnia and Herzegovina)	118–187	(Germany) MHP Riesen Ludwigsburg	59–85	59–102

==== 2017–18 FIBA Europe Cup ====
===== Regular season =====
- Day 1 (October 18, 2017)

Team 1	Score	Team 2
Bosna Royal (Bosnia and Herzegovina)	84–91	(Belgium) Telenet Antwerp Giants

- Day 2 (October 25, 2017)

Team 1	Score	Team 2
Bosna Royal (Bosnia and Herzegovina)	43–72	(Netherlands) Donar

- Day 3 (October 31, 2017)

Team 1	Score	Team 2
ESSM Le Portel (France)	101–51	(Bosnia and Herzegovina) Bosna Royal

- Day 4 (November 8, 2017)

Team 1	Score	Team 2
Telenet Antwerp Giants (Belgium)	84–77	(Bosnia and Herzegovina) Bosna Royal

- Day 5 (November 15, 2017)

Team 1	Score	Team 2
Donar (Netherlands)	94–56	(Bosnia and Herzegovina) Bosna Royal

- Day 6 (December 6, 2017)

Team 1	Score	Team 2
Bosna Royal (Bosnia and Herzegovina)	66–86	(France) ESSM Le Portel

- Group A standings:

Pos.	Team	Pld.	Pts.	W	L	PF	PA	PD
1.	(France) ESSM Le Portel	6	11	5	1	486	392	+94
2.	(Netherlands) Donar	6	10	4	2	453	391	+62
3.	(Belgium) Telenet Antwerp Giants	6	9	3	3	484	489	-5
4.	(Bosnia and Herzegovina) Bosna Royal	6	6	0	6	377	528	-51

=== 2020s ===
==== First round ====
- Tie played on September 24, 2025, and on October 1, 2025.

Team 1	Agg.	Team 2	1st leg	2nd leg
Bosna Royal (Bosnia and Herzegovina)	164–139	(Belgium) Kangoeroes Mechelen	82–57	82–82

===== Regular season =====
- Day 1 (October 15, 2025)

Team 1	Score	Team 2
Start Lublin (Poland)	90–80	(Bosnia and Herzegovina) Bosna Royal

- Day 2 (October 21, 2025)

Team 1	Score	Team 2
Bosna Royal (Bosnia and Herzegovina)	87–72	(Spain) UCAM Murcia

- Day 3 (October 29, 2025)

Team 1	Score	Team 2
Rilski Sportist (Bulgaria)	56–65	(Bosnia and Herzegovina) Bosna Royal

- Day 4 (November 5, 2025)

Team 1	Score	Team 2
Bosna Royal (Bosnia and Herzegovina)	79–70	(Poland) Start Lublin

- Day 5 (November 11, 2025)

Team 1	Score	Team 2
UCAM Murcia (Spain)	87–63	(Bosnia and Herzegovina) Bosna Royal

- Day 6 (November 19, 2025)

Team 1	Score	Team 2
Bosna Royal (Bosnia and Herzegovina)	66–86	(Bulgaria) Rilski Sportist

- Group A standings:

Pos	Team	Pld	W	L	PF	PA	PD	Pts	Qualification	MUR	BOS	LUB	RIL
1	(Spanish Basketball Federation) UCAM Murcia	6	5	1	507	424	+83	11	Advance to second round	—	87–63	80–75	77–63
2	(Basketball Federation of Bosnia and Herzegovina) Bosna BH Telecom	6	4	2	465	439	+26	10	Advance to second round	87–72	—	79–70	91–64
3	(Polish Basketball Federation) Start Lublin	6	2	4	478	509	−31	8		75–102	90–80	—	76–73
4	(Bulgarian Basketball Federation) Rilski Sportist	6	1	5	412	490	−78	7		61–89	56–65	95–92	—

Source: FIBA

== Worldwide and other (semi-official) European competitions ==
=== 1979 XIII FIBA Intercontinental Cup "William Jones" ===
The 1979 XIII FIBA Intercontinental Cup "William Jones" was the 13th installment of the FIBA Intercontinental Cup for men's professional basketball clubs, running from October 2, 1979, to October 6, 1979. It took place at Ginásio do Ibirapuera in São Paulo, Brazil. The trophy was won by Sírio.

==== League stage ====
- Day 1 (October 2, 1979)

Team 1	Score	Team 2
Mo-Kan All-Stars (United States)	111–114*	(Socialist Federal Republic of Yugoslavia) Bosna

^{*}Two overtimes at the end of regulation (92–92 and 105–105).

- Day 2 (October 3, 1979)

Bye

- Day 3 (October 4, 1979)

Team 1	Score	Team 2
Bosna (Socialist Federal Republic of Yugoslavia)	109–90	(Italy) Emerson Varese

- Day 4 (October 5, 1979)

Team 1	Score	Team 2
Piratas de Quebradillas (Puerto Rico)	83–84	(Socialist Federal Republic of Yugoslavia) Bosna

- Day 5 (October 6, 1979)

Team 1	Score	Team 2
Sírio (Brazil)	100–98	(Socialist Federal Republic of Yugoslavia) Bosna

- Final standings:

Pos.	Team	Pld.	Pts.	W	L	PF	PA	PD	Tie-break
1.	(Brazil) Sírio	4	7	3	1	388	356	+32	1–0
2.	(Socialist Federal Republic of Yugoslavia) Bosna	4	7	3	1	405	384	+21	0–1
3.	(Italy) Emerson Varese	4	6	2	2	327	340	-13	
4.	(Puerto Rico) Piratas de Quebradillas	4	5	1	3	333	371	-38	1–0
5.	(United States) Mo-Kan All-Stars	4	5	1	3	379	381	-2	0–1

=== 1980 XIV FIBA Intercontinental Cup "William Jones" ===
The 1980 XIV FIBA Intercontinental Cup "William Jones" was the 14th installment of the FIBA Intercontinental Cup for men's professional basketball clubs, running from October 1, 1980, to October 5, 1980. It took place at Sportska Dvorana Skenderija in Sarajevo, Yugoslavia. The trophy was won by Maccabi Tel Aviv.

==== League stage ====
- Day 1 (October 1, 1980)

Team 1	Score	Team 2
Bosna (Socialist Federal Republic of Yugoslavia)	111–93	(United States) Kansas All-Stars

- Day 2 (October 2, 1980)

Team 1	Score	Team 2
Bosna (Socialist Federal Republic of Yugoslavia)	84–88	(Israel) Maccabi Tel Aviv

- Day 3 (October 3, 1980)

Bye

- Day 4 (October 4, 1980)

Team 1	Score	Team 2
Bosna (Socialist Federal Republic of Yugoslavia)	93–91	(Spain) Real Madrid

- Day 5 (October 5, 1980)

Team 1	Score	Team 2
Bosna (Socialist Federal Republic of Yugoslavia)	80–81	(Brazil) Atlética Francana

- Final standings:

Pos.	Team	Pld.	Pts.	W	L	PF	PA	PD	Tie-break
1.	(Israel) Maccabi Tel Aviv	4	7	3	1	368	349	+19	1–0
2.	(Brazil) Atlética Francana	4	7	3	1	357	315	+42	0–1
3.	(Socialist Federal Republic of Yugoslavia) Bosna	4	6	2	2	368	353	+15	1–0
4.	(Spain) Real Madrid	4	6	2	2	374	399	-25	0–1
5.	(United States) Kansas All-Stars	4	4	0	4	344	395	-51	

== Record ==
KK Bosna has overall, from 1974 to 1975 (first participation), 80 wins against 74 defeats plus 2 draws in 156 games for all the European club competitions.

- EuroLeague: 40–21 (61)
- FIBA Saporta Cup: 6–18 (24) /// EuroCup Basketball: 5–7 (12)
- FIBA Korać Cup: 31–18 plus 2 draws (51) /// FIBA EuroChallenge: 0–2 (2) /// Basketball Champions League: 0–2 (2)
- FIBA Europe Cup: 0–6 (6)

Also KK Bosna Royal has a 5–3 record in the FIBA Intercontinental Cup.

== See also ==
- Yugoslav basketball clubs in European competitions
