= 1975–76 FIBA Korać Cup =

- League: FIBA Korać Cup
- Sport: Basketball

Finals
- Champions: (Socialist Federal Republic of Yugoslavia) Jugoplastika
- Runners-up: (Italy) Chinamartini Torino

FIBA Korać Cup seasons
- ← 1974–75 1976–77 →

The 1975–76 FIBA Korać Cup was the fifth edition of FIBA's new competition, running from 28 October 1975 to 23 March 1976. It was contested by 30 teams, twelve less than in the previous edition.

Jugoplastika defeated Chinamartini Torino in the final to become the competition's champion for first time.

== Season teams ==
Country	Teams	Clubs (ranking in 1974–75 national league)			
Belgium	4	Imo Scheers Lier	Standard Liège	Éveil Monceau	Bavi Astroturf
France	4	Olympique Antibes	Berck	Caen	Moderne
Greece	4	Panellinios	AEK	PAOK	Panionios
Italy	4	Sinudyne Bologna	Mobilquattro Milano	Chinamartini Torino	Brina Rieti
Bulgaria	2	Botev	Cherno More Port Varna		
Israel	2	Hapoel Tel Aviv	Hapoel Ramat Gan		
Spain	2	FC Barcelona	Juventud Schweppes		
West Germany	2	04 Leverkusen	Wolfenbüttel		
(Socialist Federal Republic of Yugoslavia) Yugoslavia	2	Jugoplastika	Partizan		
Austria	1	Maximarkt Wels			
England	1	Doncaster Panthers			
Sweden	1	Gammelstads			
Turkey	1	Karşıyaka			

== First round ==
Team 1	Agg.	Team 2	1st leg	2nd leg
Bavi Astroturf (Belgium)	149–165	(France) Caen	82–73	67–92
Panionios (Greece)	163–172	(Belgium) Éveil Monceau	88–85	75–87

== Second round ==
Team 1	Agg.	Team 2	1st leg	2nd leg
Wolfenbüttel (West Germany)	165–179	(Spain) Juventud Schweppes	81–93	84–86
Panellinios (Greece)	139–168	(Socialist Federal Republic of Yugoslavia) Jugoplastika	78–63	61–105
Doncaster Panthers (England)	153–224	(France) Berck	85–101	68–123
Hapoel Tel Aviv (Israel)	158–154	(Greece) AEK	95–71	63–83
Gammelstads (Sweden)	156–185	(Belgium) Standard Liège	74–81	82–104
Maximarkt Wels (Austria)	151–182	(Italy) Sinudyne Bologna	71–89	80–93
Caen (France)	139–144	(Italy) Chinamartini Torino	79–54	60–90
Moderne (France)	179–142	(Greece) PAOK	112–73	67–69
Éveil Monceau (Belgium)	163–161	(Bulgaria) Botev	94–81	69–80
Imo Scheers Lier (Belgium)	159–160	(West Germany) 04 Leverkusen	91–73	68–87
Cherno More Port Varna (Bulgaria)	185–173	(Turkey) Karşıyaka	105–70	80–103
Hapoel Ramat Gan (Israel)	180–194	(Italy) Mobilquattro Milano	91–95	89–99

Automatically qualified to round of 16

- (Spain) FC Barcelona
- (Socialist Federal Republic of Yugoslavia) Partizan
- (Italy) Brina Rieti
- (France) Olympique Antibes

== Round of 16 ==
The round of 16 were played with a round-robin system, in which every Two Game series (TGS) constituted as one game for the record.

Key to colors
Top place in each group advance to semifinals

=== Group A ===
	Team	Pld	Pts	W	L	PF	PA	PD
1.	(Spain) Juventud Schweppes	3	5	2	1	540	515	+25
2.	(France) Moderne	3	5	2	1	508	496	+12
3.	(Italy) Brina Rieti	3	5	2	1	518	533	−15
4.	(Belgium) Éveil Monceau	3	3	0	3	470	492	−22

=== Group B ===
	Team	Pld	Pts	W	L	PF	PA	PD
1.	(Socialist Federal Republic of Yugoslavia) Jugoplastika	3	6	3	0	533	506	+27
2.	(France) Berck	3	5	2	1	552	511	+41
3.	(Belgium) Standard Liège	3	4	1	2	495	524	−29
4.	(Italy) Mobilquattro Milano	3	3	0	3	499	538	−39

=== Group C ===
	Team	Pld	Pts	W	L	PF	PA	PD
1.	(Italy) Sinudyne Bologna	3	6	3	0	564	485	+79
2.	(Socialist Federal Republic of Yugoslavia) Partizan	3	5	2	1	567	566	+1
3.	(West Germany) 04 Leverkusen	3	4	1	2	511	544	−33
4.	(Bulgaria) Cherno More	3	3	0	3	504	551	−47

=== Group D ===
	Team	Pld	Pts	W	L	PF	PA	PD
1.	(Italy) Chinamartini Torino	3	6	3	0	504	470	+34
2.	(Spain) FC Barcelona	3	5	2	1	555	513	+42
3.	(Israel) Hapoel Tel Aviv	3	4	1	2	546	558	−12
4.	(France) Olympique Antibes	3	3	0	3	503	567	−64

== Semi finals ==
Team 1	Agg.	Team 2	1st leg	2nd leg
Juventud Schweppes (Spain)	161–162	(Italy) Chinamartini Torino	107–83	54–79
Jugoplastika (Socialist Federal Republic of Yugoslavia)	166–162	(Italy) Sinudyne Bologna	74–83	92–79

== Finals ==
Team 1	Agg.	Team 2	1st leg	2nd leg
Jugoplastika (Socialist Federal Republic of Yugoslavia)	179–166	(Italy) Chinamartini Torino	97–84	82–82

1975–76 FIBA Korać Cup Champions

Jugoplastika
1st title
