= Auxilium Pallacanestro Torino =

Italian professional basketball club

Auxilium Torino
- Leagues: LBA; EuroCup
- Founded: 1974
- Dissolved: 28 June 2019
- History: Auxilium Pallacanestro Torino (1974–2008; 2015–2019)
- Arena: Palavela
- Capacity: 6,300
- Location: Turin, Piedmont, Italy
- Team colors: Yellow, Navy
- Main sponsor: Fiat
- President: Antonio Forni
- Head coach: Paolo Galbiati
- Team captain: Giuseppe Poeta
- Championships: 1 Italian Cup
- Retired numbers: 1 (11)
- Website: auxiliumcustorino.com
Home	Away

Auxilium Pallacanestro Torino was an Italian professional basketball club in Turin, Piedmont. It competed in the first division of Italian basketball, the Lega Basket Serie A for the last time in the 2018–19 season. The club won one trophy, the Italian Basketball Cup, in 2018.

In June 2019, Auxilium was dissolved after the club was declared bankrupt after months of financial struggles, which had led to relegation from the LBA in May.

== History ==
=== The beginnings ===
The club was founded in 1966 under the initiative of Don Gino Borgogno, a Salesian priest, who regrouped all the different oratories (Christian youth social clubs) practising basketball in Turin under one organisation, Auxilium Torino, based in the Agnelli oratory.

The club was promoted to the fourth-division Serie C in 1970 and moved up to the Serie B in 1972. At the same time another local side, Libertas, based in Asti and sponsored by Saclà, was moving quickly up the divisions, reaching the second division in 1971 and the first division Serie A in 1972. However, Saclà Asti wanted to move to a bigger arena and market, transferring to Turin in 1973, which meant the city had two clubs in the national divisions.

The clubs merged in the 1974 offseason after protracted discussions, with Asti president (Carlo Ercole), coach (Lajos Tóth), players, and sponsors transferring to Auxilium (now Saclà Torino) which played in the newly-formed second division Serie A2 while nearly all the Auxilium players were sent to Asti to play in the Serie B.

=== Serie A ===
In its first season in Serie A2, Auxilium was promoted to the Serie A.

During the 1975 off-season, the club changed coaches and sponsors, with Martini & Rossi becoming the main sponsor under the Chinamartini brand. The renamed team was relegated domestically, but this was compensated by a run to the 1976 Korać Cup final, in which it came back from a first-leg deficit of 24 points to beat Juventud Schweppes by one point in the semifinals before losing in the final to the Yugoslavian team Jugoplastika Split.

Torino returned to Serie A in 1979, staying there until 1989 and battling for honours during that decade, with playoff semifinals places in 1982, 1984, 1985, and 1986.

After one season in the Serie A2, the club returned to the Serie A in 1990, staying there until 1993.

=== The Minors ===
Though the club finished outside the relegation places in the two Serie A2 seasons it played, it struggled financially and, in July 1995, asked the league to play in the Serie B to reduce its debts, also selling its best players for that purpose.

Playing a few years at that level, Auxilium was relegated to Serie B2 at the end of the 1998–99 season, following which it merged with Pallacanestro Cerea Collegno in order to ask for a place in the Serie B1. The latter organisation's president, Giovanni Garrone, became Auxilium president, with the club's base and home arena moved to Collegno. The new organisation did not have more success, and was relegated from the Serie B2 to the Serie C within a year. It played at that level until it was amalgamated into Torino Basket, formed from the merger of two historic Turin clubs, Don Bosco Crocetta and Reale Società Ginnastica, in 2007, disappearing on the occasion.

=== PMS ===
PMS Basketball was founded in 2009 by the merger of Pallacanestro Moncalieri and Libertas Amici San Mauro (with the PMS an acronym of Pallacanestro Moncalieri San Mauro). Playing in the Serie B Dilettanti (fourth division), the side won promotion and the league's cup in 2009–10.

In 2011, the senior team, based in Turin and playing in the PalaRuffini - changed its name to PMS Torino, keeping the PMS Basketball name for its youth activities. One year later, Antonio Forni, formerly president of Pallacanestro Biella, joined the founder Paolo Terzolo as club co-president, announcing his desire to return Torino to the Serie within three years. It reached the second division DNA Gold in 2013, losing in the promotion playoffs at the end of the season.

=== Auxilium comeback ===
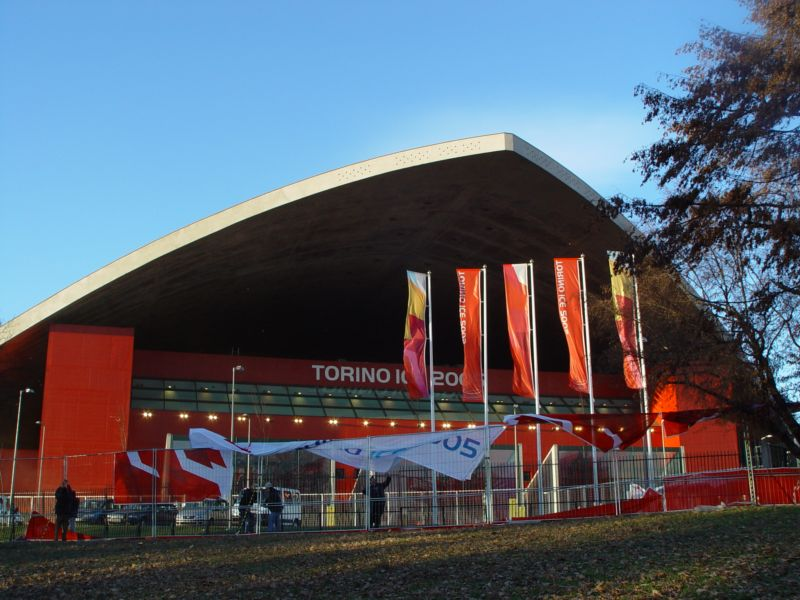
From 2018, home games were played in the Palavela

The club obtained promotion at the second try, beating Agrigento in the 2014–15 finals series to earn a place in Serie A. Soon afterwards, it was announced that Forni had obtained the Auxilium brand that Garrone had given to former coach Giovanni Asti when the club shut down, with the club renamed as Auxilium CUS Torino as a separate legal entity with CUS Torino (Centro Universitario Sportivo, a club founded in 1946) providing the youth sector under an agreement. PMS Basketball, with Terzolo at its head, separated from the club to play in Moncalieri, at a level no higher than the Serie B.

=== Italian Cup winners ===
The 2018 Italian Basketball Cup was the first played by Auxilium Torino. After beating Umana Reyer Venezia in the quarter-finals and then Vanoli Cremona in the semi-finals, in the final game Sasha Vujačić’s layup in the dying seconds lifted Fiat Torino to a 69-67 victory over Germani Basket Brescia for the club's first Italian Cup. After a series of threes in the closing seconds left the game tied, Brescia had the ball for what appeared to be the final possession, but Marcus Landry and Luca Vitali each missed, Deron Washington picked up the loose ball and started a fast break that Vujacic finished with the winning layup. Diante Garrett paced Fiat with 16 points, Nobel Boungou Colo and Vander Blue added 11 points each and Washington scored 10 for the winners. Landry paced Brescia with 22 points and 9 rebounds and Michele Vitali added 14 points in defeat.

=== Dissolution ===
On 10 May 2019, the Federal Council deducted eight points from Torino due to financial irregularities. Consequently, the club was relegated to the Serie A2 Basket after finishing last in the season. On 28 June 2019, the club was declared bankrupt. In Basket Torino, a new professional club from the city was founded.

== Arenas ==
Auxilium Torino played its home games at the 4,500 seat PalaRuffini from 1974 to 2000. From 2000 to 2008, the club used the 1,350 seat PalaCollegno as its home arena. The club returned to PalaRuffini from 2015 to 2018. In 2018, the club moved to the 6,300 seat Palavela.

== Season by season ==
Season	Tier	League	Pos.	Italian Cup	European competitions	
2012–13	3	Nazionale A	1st			
2013–14	2	LNP Gold	5th			
2014–15	2	LNP Gold	1st			
2015–16	1	LBA	15th			
2016–17	1	LBA	11th			
2017–18	1	LBA	11th	Champion	2 EuroCup	T16
2018–19	1	LBA	16th		2 EuroCup	RS

== Honours ==
=== Domestic competitions ===
- Italian Cup

Winners (1): 2017–18

- Italian Supercup

Runners-up (1): 2018

=== European competitions ===
- FIBA Korać Cup

Runners-up (1): 1975–76

== Notable players ==
1970s

- (United States) John Grochowalski 6 seasons: '76–'80
- (Italy) Romeo Sacchetti 5 seasons: '79–'84
- (Italy) Pino Brumatti 6 seasons: '77–'83
- (Italy) Maurizio Benatti 6 seasons: '78–'82

1980s

- (United States) Darryl Dawkins 2 seasons: '89–'91
- (Italy) Alessandro Abbio 6 seasons: '88–'94
- (United States) Joe Kopicki 3 seasons: '88–'91
- (Italy) Giampiero Savio 3 seasons: '85–'88
- (Italy) Davide Pessina 4 seasons: '84–'88
- (United States) Scott May 3 seasons: '83–'86
- (Italy) Riccardo Morandotti 8 seasons: '82–'90
- (Italy) Renzo Vecchiato 5 seasons: '82–'87
- (Italy) Carlo Caglieris 4 seasons: '81–'85

1990s

- (United States) Jay Vincent 1 season: '92–'93
- (United States) Kevin Magee 1 season: '91–'92

2010s

- (United States) Jamil Wilson 2 season: '16–'17, '18–present
- (United States) Ryan Hollins 1 season: 2017
- (United States) D. J. White 2 season: '15–'17
- (Italy) Stefano Mancinelli 3 seasons: '13–'16
- (Italy) Guido Rosselli 2 seasons: '14–'16
- (United States) Jerome Dyson 1 season: '15–'16
- (United States) James Michael McAdoo 1 season: '18–'19
- (Argentina) Carlos Delfino 1 season: '18–'19
- (Slovenia) Sasha Vujačić 1 season: '17–'18
- (United States) Trevor Mbakwe 1 season: '17–'18
- (United States) Lamar Patterson 1 season: '17–'18
- (United States) Victor Rudd 1 season: 2018
- (United States) Tony Carr

== Head coaches ==
- (Hungary) Lajos Tóth 1 season: '74–'75
- (Italy) Giovanni Asti 6 seasons: '76–'77, '80–'83, '87–'89
- (Italy) Sandro Gamba 3 seasons: '77–'80
- (Italy) Giuseppe Guerrieri 6 seasons: '83–'86, '89–'91, '93–'95
- (Italy) Romeo Sacchetti 5 seasons: '96–'98, '96–'98
- (Italy) Luca Banchi 1 season: '17–'18
- (Italy) Carlo Recalcati 1 season: '18
- (United States) Larry Brown 1 season: '18
- (Italy) Paolo Galbiati : '18–'19

== Sponsorship names ==
Throughout the years, due to sponsorship deals, it has been known as:

- Saclà Torino (1974–75)
- Chinamartini Torino (1975–79)
- Grimaldi Torino (1979–81)
- Berloni Torino (1981–87)
- San Benedetto Torino (1987–88)
- Ipifim Torino (1988–90)
- Auxilium Torino (1990–91)
- Robe di Kappa (1991–93)
- Francorosso (1993–95)
- Kappa (1995–98)
- Caffarel (1998–99)
- Auxilium Torino (1999–02)
- Iscot Auxilium (2002–08)
- Manital Torino (2015–16)
- FIAT Torino (2016–2019)
