= 1976–77 FIBA Korać Cup =

- League: FIBA Korać Cup
- Sport: Basketball

Final
- Champions: (Socialist Federal Republic of Yugoslavia) Jugoplastika
- Runners-up: (Italy) Alco Bologna

FIBA Korać Cup seasons
- ← 1975–76 1977–78 →

The 1976–77 FIBA Korać Cup was the sixth edition of FIBA's new competition, running from 19 October 1976 to 5 April 1977. It was contested by 27 teams, three less than in the previous edition.

Jugoplastika defeated another one Italian club, Alco Bologna, and became the second back-to-back champion in this competition, after a single final that was held at Palasport della Fiera in Genova, Italy, on 5 April 1977. Alleging lack of sport and economic interest, the Spanish teams (FC Barcelona and Estudiantes Monteverde) eligible to participate in FIBA Korać Cup this season.

== Season teams ==
| Country | Teams | Clubs (ranking in 1975–76 national league) | | | |
|---|---|---|---|---|---|
| France | 4 | Berck | Caen | ESM Challans | Moderne |
| Greece | 4 | Panathinaikos | Panionios | Aris | Iraklis |
| Italy | 4 | IBP Stella Azzurra | Alco Fortitudo Bologna | Canon Venezia | Snaidero Udine |
| Belgium | 2 | Standard Liège | Éveil Monceau | | |
| Bulgaria | 2 | Balkan Botevgrad | CSKA Septemvriisko zname | | |
| Israel | 2 | Hapoel Ramat Gan | Hapoel Tel Aviv | | |
| West Germany | 2 | SSV Hagen | Gießen 46ers | | |
| (Socialist Federal Republic of Yugoslavia) Yugoslavia | 2 | Jugoplastika | Bosna | | |
| Austria | 1 | Maximarkt Wels | | | |
| Poland | 1 | Polonia Warszawa | | | |
| Portugal | 1 | Sangalhos | | | |
| Soviet Union | 1 | Dynamo Moscow | | | |
| Turkey | 1 | Karşıyaka | | | |

== First round ==
| Team 1 | Agg. | Team 2 | 1st leg | 2nd leg |
|---|---|---|---|---|
| Sangalhos (Portugal) | 109–205 | (Italy) Alco Fortitudo Bologna | 68–97 | 41–108 |
| Snaidero Udine (Italy) | 179–168 | (Austria) Maximarkt Wels | 92–85 | 87–83 |
| Panathinaikos (Greece) | 152–153 | (Belgium) Standard Liège | 90–75 | 62–78 |
| Canon Venezia (Italy) | 176–142 | (Turkey) Karşıyaka | 89–58 | 87–84 |
| Iraklis (Greece) | 147–187 | (Socialist Federal Republic of Yugoslavia) Bosna | 83–91 | 64–96 |

== Second round ==
| Team 1 | Agg. | Team 2 | 1st leg | 2nd leg |
|---|---|---|---|---|
| Panionios (Greece) | 130–185 | (Italy) Alco Fortitudo Bologna | 72–96 | 58–89 |
| Balkan Botevgrad (Bulgaria) | 164–170 | (Italy) Snaidero Udine | 88–69 | 76–101 |
| Berck (France) | 181–174 | (West Germany) Gießen 46ers | 100–83 | 81–91 |
| Caen (France) | 210–172 | (West Germany) SSV Hagen | 114–69 | 96–103 |
| Standard Liège (Belgium) | 194–165 | (Poland) Polonia Warszawa | 113–82 | 81–83 |
| Canon Venezia (Italy) | 140–129 | (France) ESM Challans | 82–60 | 58–69 |
| Hapoel Ramat Gan (Israel) | 157–149 | (Belgium) Éveil Monceau | 86–68 | 71–81 |
| CSKA Septemvriisko zname (Bulgaria) | 195–202 | (Socialist Federal Republic of Yugoslavia) Bosna | 117–100 | 78–102 |
| Aris (Greece) | 147–198 | (Italy) IBP Stella Azzurra | 79–80 | 68–118 |
| Hapoel Tel Aviv (Israel) | 174–166 | (France) Moderne | 100–79 | 74–87 |

Automatically qualified to round of 12

- (Socialist Federal Republic of Yugoslavia) Jugoplastika (title holder)
- (Soviet Union) Dynamo Moscow

== Round of 12 ==
Key to colors
| Top place in each group advance to semifinals |

=== Group A ===
| | Team | Pld | Pts | W | L | PF | PA | PD |
|---|---|---|---|---|---|---|---|---|
| 1. | (France) Berck | 4 | 7 | 3 | 1 | 401 | 386 | +15 |
| 2. | (Soviet Union) Dynamo Moscow | 4 | 6 | 2 | 2 | 386 | 378 | +8 |
| 3. | (Italy) Snaidero Udine | 4 | 5 | 1 | 3 | 370 | 393 | −23 |

=== Group B ===
| | Team | Pld | Pts | W | L | PF | PA | PD |
|---|---|---|---|---|---|---|---|---|
| 1. | (Italy) Alco Fortitudo Bologna | 4 | 7 | 3 | 1 | 354 | 339 | +15 |
| 2. | (Socialist Federal Republic of Yugoslavia) Bosna | 4 | 7 | 3 | 1 | 388 | 369 | +19 |
| 3. | (Israel) Hapoel Tel Aviv | 4 | 4 | 0 | 4 | 361 | 395 | −34 |

=== Group C ===
| | Team | Pld | Pts | W | L | PF | PA | PD |
|---|---|---|---|---|---|---|---|---|
| 1. | (Italy) IBP Stella Azzurra | 4 | 8 | 4 | 0 | 355 | 325 | +30 |
| 2. | (France) Caen | 4 | 6 | 2 | 2 | 374 | 330 | +44 |
| 3. | (Israel) Hapoel Ramat Gan | 4 | 4 | 0 | 4 | 330 | 404 | −74 |

=== Group D ===
| | Team | Pld | Pts | W | L | PF | PA | PD |
|---|---|---|---|---|---|---|---|---|
| 1. | (Socialist Federal Republic of Yugoslavia) Jugoplastika | 4 | 8 | 4 | 0 | 376 | 313 | +63 |
| 2. | (Italy) Canon Venezia | 4 | 5 | 1 | 3 | 323 | 365 | −42 |
| 3. | (Belgium) Standard Liège | 4 | 5 | 1 | 3 | 327 | 348 | −21 |

== Semi finals ==
| Team 1 | Agg. | Team 2 | 1st leg | 2nd leg |
|---|---|---|---|---|
| Alco Fortitudo Bologna (Italy) | 169–163 | (France) Berck | 81–68 | 88–95 |
| Jugoplastika (Socialist Federal Republic of Yugoslavia) | 172–158 | (Italy) IBP Stella Azzurra | 96–71 | 76–87 |

== Final ==
April 5, Palasport della Fiera, Genoa

| Team 1 | Score | Team 2 |
|---|---|---|
| Jugoplastika (Socialist Federal Republic of Yugoslavia) | 87–84 | (Italy) Alco Fortitudo Bologna |

1976–77 FIBA Korać Cup Champions

Jugoplastika
2nd title
