= Berck Basket Club =

Berck Basketball Club is a French professional basketball team that is located in the commune of Berck, in the north of France.

== History ==
The club was founded in 1929, as A.S. Berck (French: Association Sportive de Berck), but its peak was during the 1970s, when they became back-to-back French League champions, and reached the FIBA European Champions Cup (EuroLeague) semifinals twice in a row.

=== Names through history ===
- 1929–1975: A.S. Berck Basket
- 1975–present: Berck B.C.

== Honours ==
=== Domestic competitions ===
- French League

Champions (2): 1972–73, 1973–74

== International record ==
Season	Achievement	Notes
EuroLeague
1973–74	Semifinals, third place,	eliminated by Real Madrid, 67–99 (L) in Madrid and 81–95 (L) in Berck
1974–75	Semifinals, third place,	eliminated by Ignis Varèse, 85–86 (L) in Berck and 79–98 (L) in Varese
Korać Cup
1976–77	Semifinals	eliminated by Alco Bologna, 68–81 (L) in Bologna and 95–88 (W) in Berck

== Notable players ==
Note: Flags indicate national team eligibility at FIBA-sanctioned events. Players may hold other non-FIBA nationalities not displayed.

Criteria

To appear in this section a player must have either:

- Set a club record or won an individual award while at the club
- Played at least one official international match for their national team at any time
- Played at least one official NBA match at any time.

- (France) Pierre Galle
- (United States) Ken Gardner
- (United States) Mike Stewart

== Wheelchair section ==
- 3× European Champion (1985, 1986, 1989)
