= 2019–20 Total League season =

2019–20 Total League
- Season: 2019–20
- Teams: 10

The 2019–20 Total League season, is the 67th season of the first division of the professional basketball in Luxembourg.

On 12 March 2020, the National Federation announced all games since that date would be annulled. Etzella is the defending champion.

== Competition format ==
The regular season consisted in a double-legged round robin tournament where the six first qualified teams advanced to the group for the title, while the other four teams played for avoiding relegation.

In the second stage, all wins from the regular season count for the standings, while the points are reset. The four first qualified teams in the group for the title, advanced to the playoffs, played in a format of best-of-three-games series.

Teams of the relegation group play twice against themselves and twice against the four first qualified teams of the first stage of the Nationale 2. The two worst teams would be relegated.

== Teams ==
Locations of the 2019–20 Total League teams

Club	City	Arena
Amicale	Steinsel	Hall omnisports "Alain Marchetti"
Arantia	Larochette	Hall sportif Centre Filano
Contern	Contern	Hall sportif "Um Ewent"
Esch	Esch-sur-Alzette	Hall omnisport Esch-sur-Alzette
Etzella	Ettelbruck	Centre sportif du Deich
Heffingen	Heffingen	Centre sportif Heffingen
Musel Pikes	Stadtbredimus	Sporthal Stadbriedemes
Racing Luxembourg	Luxembourg City	Centre sportif Tramsschapp
Sparta Bertrange	Bertrange	Centre Atert
T71 Dudelange	Dudelange	Salle Fos Grimler

== Regular season ==
=== League table ===
Pos	Team	Pld	W	L	PF	PA	PD	Pts	Qualification
1	Musel Pikes	18	14	4	1561	1407	+154	32	Qualification for the group for the title
2	Esch	18	13	5	1519	1361	+158	31	Qualification for the group for the title
3	T71 Dudelange	18	11	7	1618	1466	+152	29	Qualification for the group for the title
4	Etzella	18	9	9	1522	1524	−2	27	Qualification for the group for the title
5	Heffingen	18	9	9	1394	1419	−25	27	Qualification for the group for the title
6	Racing Luxembourg	18	8	10	1327	1323	+4	26	Qualification for the group for the title
7	Sparta Bertrange	18	8	10	1527	1544	−17	26	Qualification for the relegation group
8	Arantia	18	8	10	1466	1571	−105	26	Qualification for the relegation group
9	Contern	18	5	13	1504	1671	−167	23	Qualification for the relegation group
10	Amicale	18	5	13	1404	1586	−182	23	Qualification for the relegation group

=== Results ===
Home \ Away	AMI	ARA	CON	ESC	ETZ	HEF	MUS	RAC	SPA	DUD
Amicale	—	77–82	91–102	62–80	94–81	93–83	71–89	74–63	95–75	77–106
Arantia	90–86	—	98–91	77–81	103–89	76–81	68–76	74–90	96–87	90–74
Contern	85–71	78–92	—	92–106	80–110	69–68	83–89	87–91	88–82	105–109
Esch	103–78	94–89	104–73	—	68–77	92–82	83–76	67–59	86–64	82–89
Etzella	98–89	76–81	108–57	75–97	—	94–83	79–93	57–84	84–99	96–71
Heffingen	88–85	90–78	74–70	72–67	81–86	—	66–75	78–61	95–70	76–75
Musel Pikes	82–91	91–66	100–86	78–66	103–89	83–72	—	76–66	102–101	83–93
Racing Luxembourg	69–49	79–56	84–92	67–79	72–68	60–66	70–65	—	69–80	76–90
Sparta Bertrange	105–78	103–84	101–91	81–72	83–84	93–75	76–104	74–82	—	66–83
T71 Dudelange	105–43	128–72	93–75	76–92	86–101	92–64	81–96	91–85	76–87	—

Legend: Blue = home team win; Red = away team win.

== Group for the title ==
=== League table ===
Pos	Team	Pld	W	L	PF	PA	PD	Pts	Qualification
1	Esch	23	17	6	428	390	+38	40	Qualification for the semifinals
2	Musel Pikes	23	17	6	424	411	+13	40	Qualification for the semifinals
3	Etzella	23	13	10	447	393	+54	36	Qualification for the quarterfinals
4	T71 Dudelange	23	12	11	390	422	−32	35	Qualification for the quarterfinals
5	Racing Luxembourg	23	10	13	368	372	−4	33	Qualification for the quarterfinals
6	Heffingen	23	10	13	352	421	−69	33	Qualification for the quarterfinals

Updated to match(es) played on 7 March 2020. Source:

=== Results ===
Home \ Away	ESC	ETZ	HEF	MUS	RAC	DUD
Esch	—	62–89	102–63			99–84
Etzella		—	97–86		93–68	
Heffingen			—	73–77	54–82	
Musel Pikes	82–86	103–88		—		95–90
Racing Luxembourg	72–79			74–67	—	
T71 Dudelange		74–80	63–76		79–72	—

Updated to match(es) played on 7 March 2020. Source: FLBB
Legend: Blue = home team win; Red = away team win.

== Relegation group ==
=== League table ===
Pos	Team	Pld	W	L	PF	PA	PD	Pts	Relegation
1	Sparta Bertrange	23	12	11	472	436	+36	35	
2	Arantia	23	10	13	481	475	+6	33	
3	Amicale	23	9	14	466	431	+35	32	Relegated to Nationale 2
4	Contern	23	8	15	459	480	−21	31	Relegated to Nationale 2

Updated to match(es) played on 7 March 2020. Source:

=== Results ===
Only matches between Total League teams are included.

Home \ Away	AMI	ARA	BLA	CON	RES	SOL	SPA	TEL
Amicale	—				96–84		97–80	88–73
Arantia	112–99	—					90–91	
Black Star	82–86	91–99	—		—	—	87–107	—
Contern		104–96	103–93	—		88–75		
Résidence			—	113–84	—	—		—
Soleuvre		90–84	—		—	—		—
Sparta Bertrange					90–80		—	104–82
Telstar			—	103–80	—	—		—

Updated to match(es) played on 7 March 2020. Source: FLBB
Legend: Blue = home team win; Red = away team win.

== Playoffs ==
Quarterfinals are played in a best-of-three format, while semifinals and finals in a best-of-five (1-1-1-1-1) format.

=== Bracket ===
Quarter-finals

Semi-finals

Final

=== Quarter-finals ===
Team 1	Series	Team 2	Game 1	Game 2	Game 3

=== Semi-finals ===
Team 1	Series	Team 2	Game 1	Game 2	Game 3	Game 4	Game 5

=== Finals ===
Team 1	Series	Team 2	Game 1	Game 2	Game 3	Game 4	Game 5
