= 2017–18 Total League season =

2017–18 Total League
- Season: 2017–18
- Duration: 23 September 2017 – 2018
- Teams: 10

Regular season
- Relegated: Contern; Hiefenech

Finals
- Champions: Amicale (8th title)
- Runners-up: Etzella

The 2017–18 Total League season was the 65th season of the first division of the professional basketball in Luxembourg.

Amicale defended successfully its title and achieved their eighth league.

== Competition format ==
The regular season consisted in a double-legged round robin tournament where the six first qualified teams advanced to the group for the title, while the other four teams played for avoiding relegation.

In the second stage, all wins from the regular season counted for the standings, while the points are reset. The four first qualified teams in the group for the title, advanced to the playoffs, played in a format of best-of-three-games series.

Teams of the relegation group play twice against themselves and twice against the four first qualified teams of the first stage of the Nationale 2. The two worst teams would be relegated.

== Teams ==
Locations of the 2017–18 Total League teams

Club	City	Arena
AB Contern	Contern	Hall sportif "Um Ewent"
Amicale Steinsel	Steinsel	Hall omnisports "Alain Marchetti"
Racing Luxembourg	Luxembourg City	Centre sportif Tramsschapp
Basket Esch	Esch-sur-Alzette	Hall omnisport Esch-sur-Alzette
Etzella Ettelbruck	Ettelbruck	Centre sportif du Deich
Musel Pikes	Stadtbredimus	Sporthal Stadbriedemes
Résidence	Walferdange	Centre Prince Henri
Sparta Bertrange	Bertrange	Centre Atert
T71 Dudelange	Dudelange	Salle Fos Grimler
US Hiefenech	Heffingen	Centre sportif Heffingen

== Regular season ==
Pos	Team	Pld	W	L	PF	PA	PD	Pts	Qualification
1	Amicale	18	15	3	1674	1339	+335	33	Qualification for the group for the title
2	Etzella	18	14	4	1620	1419	+201	32	Qualification for the group for the title
3	Esch	18	13	5	1478	1370	+108	31	Qualification for the group for the title
4	T71 Dudelange	18	10	8	1625	1573	+52	28	Qualification for the group for the title
5	Musel Pikes	18	9	9	1532	1462	+70	27	Qualification for the group for the title
6	Sparta Bertrange	18	9	9	1461	1498	−37	27	Qualification for the group for the title
7	Contern	18	6	12	1415	1586	−171	24	Qualification for the relegation group
8	Racing Luxembourg	18	6	12	1306	1446	−140	24	Qualification for the relegation group
9	Résidence	18	5	13	1517	1594	−77	23	Qualification for the relegation group
10	Hiefenech	18	3	15	1269	1610	−341	21	Qualification for the relegation group

== Second stage ==
=== Group for the title ===
Pos	Team	Pld	W	L	PF	PA	PD	Pts	Qualification
1	Etzella	23	18	5	473	438	+35	41	Qualification for the semifinals
2	Amicale	23	18	5	462	424	+38	41	Qualification for the semifinals
3	Esch	23	15	8	376	396	−20	38	Qualification for the quarterfinals
4	T71 Dudelange	23	13	10	419	421	−2	36	Qualification for the quarterfinals
5	Musel Pikes	23	12	11	468	423	+45	35	Qualification for the quarterfinals
6	Sparta Bertrange	23	9	14	368	484	−116	32	Qualification for the quarterfinals

=== Relegation group ===
Pos	Team	Pld	W	L	PF	PA	PD	Pts	Relegation
1	Racing Luxembourg	31	19	12	1182	897	+285	50	
2	Résidence	31	15	16	1191	1043	+148	46	
3	Contern (R)	31	11	20	1135	1140	−5	42	Relegation to Nationale 2
4	Hiefenech (R)	31	7	24	1052	1102	−50	38	Relegation to Nationale 2

Updated to match(es) played on 29 April 2018. Source:
(R) Relegated

== Playoffs ==
=== Bracket ===
Seeded teams played games 1, 3 and 5 at home.

Quarter-finals
T71 Dudelange	1
Musel Pikes	2
Esch	2
Sparta Bertrange	0

Semi-finals
Etzella	3
Musel Pikes	0
Amicale	3
Esch	1

Final
Etzella	0
Amicale	3

=== Quarterfinals ===
Team 1	Series	Team 2	Game 1	Game 2	Game 3
T71 Dudelange	1–2	Musel Pikes	95–86	70–98	77–79
Esch	2–0	Sparta Bertrange	93–71	92–78	

=== Semifinals ===
Team 1	Series	Team 2	Game 1	Game 2	Game 3	Game 4	Game 5
Etzella	3–0	Musel Pikes	114–94	87–64	119–103		
Amicale	3–1	Esch	64–80	76–70	82–79	102–72	

=== Finals ===
Team 1	Series	Team 2	Game 1	Game 2	Game 3	Game 4	Game 5
Etzella	0–3	Amicale	81–85	81–88	82–85		
