= 2018–19 Total League season =

2018–19 Total League
- Season: 2018–19
- Duration: 22 September 2018 – May 2019
- Teams: 10

Regular season
- Relegated: Kordall Steelers; Résidence

Finals
- Champions: Etzella (15th title)
- Runners-up: T71 Dudelange

The 2018–19 Total League season, is the 66th season of the first division of the professional basketball in Luxembourg.

Amicale is the defending champion.

== Competition format ==
The regular season consisted in a double-legged round robin tournament where the six first qualified teams advanced to the group for the title, while the other four teams played for avoiding relegation.

In the second stage, all wins from the regular season count for the standings, while the points are reset. The four first qualified teams in the group for the title, advanced to the playoffs, played in a format of best-of-three-games series.

Teams of the relegation group play twice against themselves and twice against the four first qualified teams of the first stage of the Nationale 2. The two worst teams would be relegated.

== Teams ==
Locations of the 2018–19 Total League teams

Club	City	Arena
Amicale	Steinsel	Hall omnisports "Alain Marchetti"
Arantia	Larochette	
Esch	Esch-sur-Alzette	Hall omnisport Esch-sur-Alzette
Etzella	Ettelbruck	Centre sportif du Deich
Kordall Steelers	Rodange	
Musel Pikes	Stadtbredimus	Sporthal Stadbriedemes
Racing Luxembourg	Luxembourg City	Centre sportif Tramsschapp
Résidence	Walferdange	Centre Prince Henri
Sparta Bertrange	Bertrange	Centre Atert
T71 Dudelange	Dudelange	Salle Fos Grimler

== Regular season ==
=== League table ===
Pos	Team	Pld	W	L	PF	PA	PD	Pts	Qualification
1	Etzella	18	17	1	1698	1346	+352	35	Qualification for the group for the title
2	Esch	18	14	4	1538	1341	+197	32	Qualification for the group for the title
3	Amicale	18	13	5	1494	1316	+178	31	Qualification for the group for the title
4	T71 Dudelange	18	12	6	1629	1528	+101	30	Qualification for the group for the title
5	Racing Luxembourg	18	10	8	1412	1346	+66	28	Qualification for the group for the title
6	Sparta Bertrange	18	7	11	1414	1494	−80	25	Qualification for the group for the title
7	Musel Pikes	18	7	11	1427	1469	−42	25	Qualification for the relegation group
8	Arantia	18	5	13	1441	1681	−240	23	Qualification for the relegation group
9	Kordall Steelers	18	3	15	1418	1661	−243	21	Qualification for the relegation group
10	Résidence	18	2	16	1386	1675	−289	20	Qualification for the relegation group

=== Results ===
Home \ Away	AMI	ARA	ESC	ETZ	KOR	MUS	RAC	RES	SPA	DUD
Amicale	—	80–60	76–78	48–73	101–72	91–77	94–62	87–55	90–76	90–86
Arantia	65–99	—	69–87	91–115	100–96	92–100	69–83	104–100	105–97	95–104
Esch	76–71	92–74	—	89–96	94–58	81–73	74–70	102–66	94–70	99–88
Etzella	86–84	104–64	80–67	—	108–80	95–75	93–83	101–71	88–68	90–91
Kordall Steelers	83–87	68–76	78–93	57–95	—	81–76	93–77	105–92	81–95	75–106
Musel Pikes	76–78	80–77	65–78	62–90	104–77	—	66–53	101–89	73–79	81–84
Racing Luxembourg	76–60	80–73	90–73	82–84	91–74	88–77	—	94–45	84–70	93–67
Résidence	76–79	88–89	68–103	88–102	83–79	64–92	65–74	—	87–97	76–95
Sparta Bertrange	60–81	97–72	65–84	69–86	79–70	71–76	92–84	76–54	—	85–70
T71 Dudelange	96–82	111–66	84–74	77–107	91–104	101–73	61–64	111–97	93–90	—

Legend: Blue = home team win; Red = away team win.

== Group for the title ==
=== League table ===
Pos	Team	Pld	W	L	PF	PA	PD	Pts	Qualification
1	Etzella	23	22	1	468	409	+59	45	Qualification for the semifinals
2	Esch	23	16	7	357	369	−12	39	Qualification for the semifinals
3	T71 Dudelange	23	15	8	474	443	+31	38	Qualification for the quarterfinals
4	Amicale	23	15	8	378	398	−20	38	Qualification for the quarterfinals
5	Racing Luxembourg	23	12	11	357	387	−30	35	Qualification for the quarterfinals
6	Sparta Bertrange	23	8	15	435	464	−29	31	Qualification for the quarterfinals

First match(es) will be played: unknown. Source:

=== Results ===
Home \ Away	AMI	ESC	ETZ	RAC	SPA	DUD
Amicale	—	—	—	77–54	85–80	84–93
Esch	65–47	—	—	65–77	—	95–84
Etzella	106–85	73–57	—	—	—	94–84
Racing Luxembourg	—	—	76–85	—	74–66	—
Sparta Bertrange	—	88–75	107–111	—	—	—
T71 Dudelange	—	—	—	94–76	119–94	—

Source: FLBB.lu
Legend: Blue = home team win; Red = away team win.

== Relegation group ==
=== League table ===
Pos	Team	Pld	W	L	PF	PA	PD	Pts	Relegation
1	Musel Pikes	32	14	18	1257	1141	+116	46	
2	Arantia	32	13	19	1270	1218	+52	45	
3	Kordall Steelers	32	6	26	1099	1306	−207	38	Relegation to Nationale 2
4	Résidence	32	6	26	1209	1313	−104	38	Relegation to Nationale 2

=== Results ===
Only matches of Total League teams are shown.

Home \ Away	ARA	CON	HEF	KOR	MUS	RES	SOL	HES
Arantia	—	82–95	85–101	108–68	102–94	108–97	91–87	84–69
Contern	98–83	—	—	105–68	95–86	105–87	—	—
Heffingen	83–80	—	—	80–59	88–79	107–66	—	—
Kordall Steelers	76–97	90–124	94–105	—	69–105	82–74	102–73	62–85
Musel Pikes	85–89	99–58	89–60	100–81	—	100–104	80–67	93–79
Résidence	76–84	74–97	104–77	97–92	88–94	—	109–90	77–79
Soleuvre	103–100	—	—	82–76	91–87	90–66	—	—
Telstar Hesperange	86–77	—	—	72–80	70–66	108–90	—	—

Source: FLBB.lu
Legend: Blue = home team win; Red = away team win.

== Playoffs ==
Quarterfinals are played in a best-of-three format, while semifinals and finals in a best-of-five (1-1-1-1-1) format.

=== Bracket ===
Quarter-finals
Amicale	2
Racing Luxembourg	1
T71 Dudelange	2
Sparta Bertrange	0

Semi-finals
Etzella	3
Amicale	0
Esch	2
T71 Dudelange	3

Final
Etzella	3
T71 Dudelange	1

=== Quarter-finals ===
Team 1	Series	Team 2	Game 1	Game 2	Game 3
T71 Dudelange	2–0	Sparta Bertrange	105–97	95–87	
Amicale	2–1	Racing Luxembourg	79–85	80–65	80–60

=== Semi-finals ===
Team 1	Series	Team 2	Game 1	Game 2	Game 3	Game 4	Game 5
Etzella	3–0	Amicale	101–82	73–77	86–60		
Esch	2–3	T71 Dudelange	72–67	91–102	93–76	84–88	77–92

=== Finals ===
Team 1	Series	Team 2	Game 1	Game 2	Game 3	Game 4	Game 5
Etzella	3–1	T71 Dudelange	97–77	80–89	105–95	102–100	
