= French basketball clubs in international competitions =

French basketball clubs in European and worldwide competitions is the record of professional men's basketball clubs from France's top-tier level league, the LNB Pro A, in international competitions.

== The finals ==
Season	Champion	Result	Runner-up	Date	Venue	
FIBA European Champions Cup & EuroLeague (1st tier)
1992–93	Limoges CSP (France)	59–55	(Italy) Benetton Treviso	15/04/1993	Peace and Friendship Stadium, Piraeus	
2024–25	Fenerbahçe (Turkey)	81–70	(France) Monaco	25/05/2025	Etihad Arena, Abu Dhabi	
FIBA Saporta Cup (2nd tier)
1969–70	Fides Napoli (Italy)	147–129 (two-leg)	(France) JA Vichy	15 & 26/04/1970	Salle des Ailes, Vichy	Palasport di Fuorigrotta, Naples
1975–76	Cinzano Milano (Italy)	88–83	(France) ASPO Tours	17/03/1976	PalaRuffini, Turin	
1982–83	Scavolini Pesaro (Italy)	111–99	(France) ASVEL	09/03/1983	Palacio Municipal de Deportes, Palma de Mallorca	
1987–88	Limoges CSP (France)	96–89	(Spain) Ram Joventut	16/03/1988	Palais des Sports, Grenoble	
2000–01	Maroussi (Greece)	74–72	(France) Élan Chalon	17/04/2000	Hala Torwar, Warsaw	
EuroCup Basketball (2nd tier)
2015–16	Galatasaray Odeabank (Turkey)	140–133 (two-leg)	(France) SIG Strasbourg	22 & 27/04/2015	Rhénus Sport, Strasbourg	Abdi İpekçi Arena, Istanbul
2020–21	Monaco (France)	175–170 (two-leg)	(Russia) UNICS	27 & 30/04/2021	Salle Gaston Médecin, Monaco	Basket-Hall Kazan, Kazan
2023–24	Paris Basketball (France)	166–145 (two-leg)	(France) Mincidelice JL Bourg	09 & 13/04/2024	Adidas Arena, Paris	Ekinox, Bourg-en-Bresse
2025–26	Cosea JL Bourg (France)	145–131 (two-leg)	(Turkey) Beşiktaş Gain	22 & 28/04/2026	BJK Akatlar Arena, Istanbul	Ekinox, Bourg-en-Bresse
FIBA Korać Cup (3rd tier)
1981–82	Limoges CSP (France)	90–84	(Socialist Federal Republic of Yugoslavia) Šibenka	18/03/1982	Palasport San Lazzaro, Padua	
1982–83	Limoges CSP (France)	94–86	(Socialist Federal Republic of Yugoslavia) Šibenka	08/03/1983	Deutschlandhalle, West Berlin	
1983–84	Orthez (France)	97–73	(Socialist Federal Republic of Yugoslavia) Crvena zvezda	15/03/1984	Palais des Sports Pierre-de-Coubertin, Paris	
1986–87	FC Barcelona (Spain)	203–171 (two-leg)	(France) Limoges CSP	18 & 25/03/1987	Palau Blaugrana, Barcelona	... Beaublanc, Limoges
1999–00	Limoges CSP (France)	131–118 (two-leg)	(Spain) Unicaja	22 & 29/03/2000	... Beaublanc, Limoges	Pabellón Ciudad Jardín, Málaga
2001–02	SLUC Nancy (France)	172–167 (two-leg)	(Russia) Lokomotiv Mineralnye Vody	10 & 17/04/2002	Palais des Sports Jean Weille, Nancy	SK Ekspress, Rostov-on-Don
FIBA EuroChallenge (3rd tier)
2008–09	Virtus BolognaFiere (Italy)	77–75	(France) Cholet	26/04/2009	Futurshow Station, Bologna	
2011–12	Beşiktaş Milangaz (Turkey)	91–86	(France) Élan Chalon	29/04/2012	Főnix Hall, Debrecen	
2014–15	JSF Nanterre (France)	64–63	(Turkey) Trabzonspor Medical Park	26/04/2015	Hayri Gür Arena, Trabzon	
Basketball Champions League (3rd tier)
2017–18	AEK (Greece)	100–94	(France) Monaco	04/05/2018	Nikos Galis Olympic Indoor Hall, Athens	
FIBA EuroCup Challenge (4th tier)
2003–04	Mitteldeutscher (Germany)	84–68	(France) SAOS Dijon	28/03/2004	Atatürk Spor Salonu, İzmir	
FIBA Europe Cup (4th tier)
2016–17	Nanterre 92 (France)	140–137 (two-leg)	(France) Élan Chalon	18 & 25/04/2017	Palais des Sports Maurice Thorez, Nanterre	Le Colisée, Chalon-sur-Saône
2022–23	Anwil Włocławek (Poland)	161–155 (two-leg)	(France) Cholet	19 & 26/04/2023	Hala Mistrzów, Włocławek	La Meilleraie, Cholet

== French clubs in EuroLeague (1st tier) ==
=== Season to season ===
Year	Team	_______ Earlier stage _______	________ Last 24 to 32 ________	________ Last 12 to 16 ________	_________ Last 6 to 8 _________	_________ Semifinals _________	____________ Final ____________
1958	ASVEL			(Belgium) Royal IV			
1958–59	Étoile Charleville-Mézières		(Portugal) Barreirense	(Spain) Real Madrid			
1959–60	Chorale Mulsant		(Luxembourg) Rou'de Le'w Kayl	(Belgium) Antwerpse	(Czechoslovakia) Slovan Orbis Praha		
1960–61	Étoile Charleville-Mézières		(Morocco) Casablancais	(Soviet Union) CSKA Moscow			
1961–62	Alsace de Bagnolet		(Netherlands) The Wolves Amsterdam	(Belgium) Antwerpse			
1962–63	Alsace de Bagnolet		(Northern Ireland) Celtic	(Socialist Federal Republic of Yugoslavia) AŠK Olimpija			
1963–64	PUC		(Luxembourg) Etzella	(Socialist Federal Republic of Yugoslavia) OKK Beograd			
1964–65	ASVEL		(England) Central YMCA	(Iceland) ÍR	(Spain) Real Madrid		
1965–66	Denain Voltaire		(Northern Ireland) Collegians	(Bulgaria) CSKA Cherveno zname			
1966–67	ASVEL		(Morocco) Wydad Casablanca	(Greece) AEK	4th of 4 teams		
1967–68	Alsace de Bagnolet		(Israel) Maccabi Tel Aviv				
1968–69	ASVEL		(Scotland) Edinburgh Hornets	(Socialist Federal Republic of Yugoslavia) Zadar			
1969–70	ASVEL		(Tunisia) Union Radès Transport	(Israel) Hapoel Tel Aviv	3rd of 4 teams		
1970–71	Olympique Antibes		(Iceland) ÍR	(Greece) AEK	4th of 4 teams		
1971–72	ASVEL		(Portugal) Lourenço Marques	(Austria) Radio Koch Wien			
1972–73	ASVEL		(Morocco) Fath Union Sport	(Czechoslovakia) Slavia VŠ Praha			
1973–74	Berck			(Greece) Panathinaikos	2nd of 4 teams	(Spain) Real Madrid	
1974–75	Berck			2nd of 6 teams	Bye	(Italy) Ignis Varese	
1975–76	ASVEL			2nd of 6 teams	Bye	(Spain) Real Madrid	
1976–77	ASPO Tours		2nd of 4 teams				
1977–78	ASVEL		1st of 3 teams	Bye	3rd of 6 teams		
1978–79	Moderne		2nd of 4 teams				
1979–80	Moderne		3rd of 4 teams				
1980–81	ASPO Tours		2nd of 4 teams				
1981–82	ASVEL		2nd of 4 teams				
1982–83	Moderne		(Greece) Panathinaikos	(Italy) Billy Milano			
1983–84	Limoges CSP		(Romania) Dinamo București	(Netherlands) Nashua EBBC	6th of 6 teams		
1984–85	Limoges CSP		(England) Solent Stars	(Soviet Union) CSKA Moscow			
1985–86	Limoges CSP		(Belgium) Sunair Oostende	(Greece) Aris	6th of 6 teams		
1986–87	Orthez		(Albania) Partizani Tirana	(West Germany) Bayer 04 Leverkusen	3rd of 6 teams		
1987–88	Orthez			(Turkey) Karşıyaka	7th of 8 teams		
1988–89	Limoges CSP			(Czechoslovakia) Zbrojovka Brno	5th of 8 teams		
1989–90	Limoges CSP			(Switzerland) Pully	3rd of 8 teams	(Socialist Federal Republic of Yugoslavia) Jugoplastika	(Greece) Aris
1990–91	Limoges CSP			(Bulgaria) CSKA Sofia	8th of 8 teams		
1991–92	Olympique Antibes		(Portugal) Benfica	6th of 8 teams			
1992–93	Pau-Orthez		(Turkey) Efes Pilsen	4th of 8 teams	(Greece) PAOK		
1992–93	Limoges CSP		(England) Guildford Kings	2nd of 8 teams	(Greece) Olympiacos	(Spain) Real Madrid Teka	(Italy) Benetton Treviso
1993–94	Limoges CSP			3rd of 8 teams	(Greece) Panathinaikos		
1993–94	Pau-Orthez		(North Macedonia) Rabotnički	7th of 8 teams			
1994–95	Limoges CSP		(Czech Republic) Bioveta COOP Banka Brno	1st of 8 teams	(Italy) Scavolini Pesaro	(Spain) Real Madrid Teka	(Greece) Panathinaikos (4th)
1994–95	Olympique Antibes		(Russia) CSKA Moscow				
1995–96	Olympique Antibes			6th of 8 teams			
1995–96	Pau-Orthez	(Netherlands) Rene Coltof Den Helder	(Slovenia) Smelt Olimpija	4th of 8 teams	(Russia) CSKA Moscow		
1996–97	Pau-Orthez	4th of 6 teams	5th of 6 teams				
1996–97	Limoges CSP	5th of 6 teams	4th of 6 teams	(Greece) Panathinaikos			
1996–97	ASVEL	3rd of 6 teams	2nd of 6 teams	(Spain) Estudiantes Argentaria	(Turkey) Efes Pilsen	(Spain) Banca Catalana FC Barcelona	(Slovenia) Smelt Olimpija (4th)
1997–98	PSG Racing	6th of 6 teams	5th of 6 teams				
1997–98	Pau-Orthez	3rd of 6 teams	6th of 6 teams				
1997–98	Limoges CSP	6th of 6 teams	6th of 6 teams				
1998–99	Pau-Orthez	3rd of 6 teams	4th of 6 teams	(Slovenia) Union Olimpija	(Italy) Kinder Bologna		
1998–99	ASVEL	2nd of 6 teams	2nd of 6 teams	(Croatia) Cibona	(Greece) Olympiacos		
1999–00	Pau-Orthez	6th of 6 teams	6th of 6 teams				
1999–00	ASVEL	1st of 6 teams	2nd of 6 teams	(Spain) Real Madrid Teka	(Turkey) Efes Pilsen		
1999–00	Cholet	5th of 6 teams	5th of 6 teams				
2000–01	ASVEL		6th of 10 teams	(Federal Republic of Yugoslavia) Partizan	(Russia) CSKA Moscow		
2000–01	Pau-Orthez		6th of 10 teams	(Croatia) Split CO			
2001–02	Pau-Orthez		6th of 8 teams				
2001–02	ASVEL		5th of 8 teams				
2002–03	ASVEL		5th of 8 teams	4th of 4 teams			
2002–03	Pau-Orthez		6th of 8 teams				
2003–04	Pau-Orthez		5th of 8 teams	3rd of 4 teams			
2003–04	Adecco ASVEL		8th of 8 teams				
2004–05	Pau-Orthez		8th of 8 teams				
2004–05	Adecco ASVEL		8th of 8 teams				
2005–06	SIG		7th of 8 teams				
2005–06	Pau-Orthez		7th of 8 teams				
2006–07	Le Mans Sarthe		7th of 8 teams				
2006–07	Pau-Orthez		4th of 8 teams	4th of 4 teams			
2007–08	Chorale Roanne		7th of 8 teams				
2007–08	Le Mans Sarthe		8th of 8 teams				
2008–09	SLUC Nancy		6th of 6 teams				
2008–09	Le Mans Sarthe		6th of 6 teams				
2009–10	ASVEL		5th of 6 teams				
2009–10	Entente Orléanaise Loiret		6th of 6 teams				
2010–11	Le Mans Sarthe	(Russia) Khimki					
2011–12	SLUC Nancy		6th of 6 teams				
2012–13	Élan Chalon		5th of 6 teams				
2012–13	Le Mans Sarthe	(Italy) Mapooro Cantù					
2013–14	JSF Nanterre		5th of 6 teams				
2013–14	SIG		6th of 6 teams				
2014–15	Limoges CSP		6th of 6 teams				
2014–15	ASVEL	(Russia) UNICS					
2015–16	Limoges CSP		5th of 6 teams				
2015–16	SIG		6th of 6 teams				
2016–17
2017–18

== French clubs in FIBA Saporta Cup (2nd tier) ==
=== Season to season ===
Year	Team	_______ Earlier stage _______	___________ Last 48 ___________	________ Last 24 to 32 ________	________ Last 12 to 16 ________	_________ Last 6 to 8 _________	_________ Semifinals _________	____________ Final ____________
1966–67	Nantes				(Italy) Ignis Varese			
1967–68	ASVEL			(Netherlands) Landlust	(Turkey) Fenerbahçe	(Italy) Ignis Varese		
1968–69	Stade Auto Lyon				(Bulgaria) Levski-Spartak			
1969–70	JA Vichy			(Luxembourg) Etzella	(Bulgaria) Levski-Spartak	(Belgium) Standard Liège	(Greece) AEK	(Italy) Fides Napoli
1970–71	JA Vichy			(Portugal) Porto	(Bulgaria) Balkan Botevgrad			
1971–72	Denain Voltaire			(Israel) Maccabi Haifa	(Belgium) Racing Bell Mechelen			
1972–73	Olympique Antibes			(Hungary) Csepel	(Spain) Juventud Schweppes			
1973–74	Alsace de Bagnolet			(Poland) Śląsk Wrocław	(Socialist Federal Republic of Yugoslavia) Crvena zvezda			
1974–75	Moderne				(England) Embassy All-Stars	4th of 4 teams		
1975–76	ASPO Tours				(Albania) Partizani Tirana	2nd of 4 teams	(Spain) Estudiantes Monteverde	(Italy) Cinzano Milano
1976–77	ASVEL			(England) Embassy All-Stars	(Austria) Trend Wien	4th of 4 teams		
1977–78	Caen				(Albania) Partizani Tirana	2nd of 4 teams	(Italy) Sinudyne Bologna	
1978–79	ASVEL					3rd of 4 teams		
1979–80	Caen			(Iceland) KR Reykjavík	(Sweden) KFUM Uppsala	4th of 4 teams		
1980–81	Moderne			(Egypt) Union Récréation Alexandria	(England) Doncaster Panthers	3rd of 4 teams		
1981–82	Moderne			(Sweden) Korrugal Norrköpings	(Israel) Hapoel Ramat Gan			
1982–83	ASVEL				(Sweden) Solna IF	1st of 4 teams	(Netherlands) Nashua EBBC	(Italy) Scavolini Pesaro
1983–84	Monaco			(Sweden) Hageby	(West Germany) Saturn Köln			
1984–85	ASVEL			(Belgium) Maccabi Brussels	(Sweden) Alvik	2nd of 4 teams	(Soviet Union) Žalgiris	
1985–86	Stade Français				(Czechoslovakia) Chemosvit	3rd of 4 teams		
1986–87	ASVEL			(Luxembourg) Soleuvre	(Israel) Hapoel Holon	2nd of 4 teams	(Socialist Federal Republic of Yugoslavia) Cibona	
1987–88	Limoges CSP				(Finland) Uudenkaupungin Urheilijat	1st of 4 teams	(Italy) Scavolini Pesaro	(Spain) Ram Joventut
1988–89	Pitch Cholet				(Netherlands) Miniware Weert	4th of 4 teams		
1989–90	Mulhouse				(West Germany) Bayer 04 Leverkusen	4th of 4 teams		
1990–91	Pitch Cholet				(Sweden) Uppsala	2nd of 4 teams	(Spain) CAI Zaragoza	
1991–92	Limoges CSP		(Luxembourg) Etzella	(Finland) KTP	3rd of 6 teams			
1991–92	Pau-Orthez		(Romania) Universitatea Cluj	Bye	3rd of 6 teams			
1992–93	Pitch Cholet		(Luxembourg) T71 Dudelange	(Portugal) Ovarense	5th of 6 teams			
1993–94	Pitch Cholet		(Belgium) Go Pass Verviers-Pepinster	(Finland) Uudenkaupungin Urheilijat	1st of 6 teams	Bye	(Spain) Taugrés	
1994–95	SIG		(Romania) Universitatea Cluj	(Switzerland) Fidefinanz Bellinzona				
1994–95	Olympique Antibes			(Croatia) Zagreb	1st of 6 teams	Bye	(Italy) Benetton Treviso	
1995–96	Limoges CSP		(Portugal) Porto	(Ukraine) Dendi	3rd of 6 teams			
1996–97	Olympique Antibes		3rd of 6 teams	(Latvia) Rīgas ASK				
1996–97	PSG Racing		2nd of 6 teams	(Portugal) Benfica	(Lithuania) Žalgiris	(Turkey) Türk Telekom PTT	(Spain) Real Madrid Teka	
1997–98	ASVEL		2nd of 6 teams	(Federal Republic of Yugoslavia) FMP	(Spain) Festina Joventut	(Italy) Stefanel Milano		
1997–98	Le Mans Sarthe		1st of 6 teams	(Finland) Torpan Pojat				
1998–99	Cholet		1st of 6 teams	(Portugal) Estrelas da Avenida	(Slovenia) Pivovarna Laško			
1998–99	Limoges CSP		2nd of 6 teams	(Belgium) Spirou				
1999–00	Élan Chalon		3rd of 6 teams	(Poland) Hoop Pekaes	(Spain) Pamesa Valencia			
1999–00	PSG Racing		1st of 6 teams	(Netherlands) Ricoh Astronauts	(Croatia) Zadar			
2000–01	Racing Paris			5th of 6 teams				
2000–01	Élan Chalon			3rd of 6 teams	(Portugal) Porto	(Poland) Anwil Włocławek	(Spain) Pamesa Valencia	(Greece) Maroussi
2001–02	Le Mans Sarthe			5th of 6 teams				
2001–02	SIG			4th of 6 teams	(Italy) Montepaschi Siena			

== French clubs in FIBA Korać Cup (3rd tier) ==
=== Season to season ===
Year	Team	_______ Earlier stage _______	________ Last 64 to 48 ________	________ Last 24 to 32 ________	________ Last 12 to 16 ________	_________ Last 6 to 8 _________	_________ Semifinals _________	____________ Final ____________
1972	Olympique Antibes					(Spain) Manresa La Casera	(Socialist Federal Republic of Yugoslavia) OKK Beograd	
1972	Caen					(Socialist Federal Republic of Yugoslavia) Lokomotiva		
1973	Denain Voltaire				2nd of 3 teams			
1973	Berck				2nd of 3 teams			
1973–74	Denain Voltaire		(Socialist Federal Republic of Yugoslavia) Jugoplastika					
1973–74	Olympique Antibes			(Spain) Kas Vitoria	3rd of 3 teams			
1973–74	ASVEL		(Netherlands) EBBC	(Belgium) Carad	1st of 3 teams	Bye	(Italy) Forst Cantù	
1974–75	JA Vichy			(West Germany) Wolfenbüttel	Withdrawal †			
1974–75	ASVEL			(Netherlands) Nationale-Nederlanden Donar	2nd of 4 teams			
1974–75	ASPO Tours			(West Germany) 1.FC Bamberg	3rd of 4 teams			
1974–75	Chorale Mulsant			(Belgium) Sunair Oostende				
1974–75	Olympique Antibes			(Spain) YMCA España	4th of 4 teams			
1974–75	Denain Voltaire		(Spain) Pineda de Mar	(Italy) Innocenti Milano				
1974–75	Monaco		(Netherlands) Levi's Flamingo's	(Israel) Hapoel Ramat Gan	4th of 4 teams			
1974–75	Caen			(Socialist Federal Republic of Yugoslavia) Partizan				
1975–76	Moderne			(Greece) PAOK	2nd of 4 teams			
1975–76	Olympique Antibes				4th of 4 teams			
1975–76	Caen		(Belgium) Bavi Astroturf	(Italy) Chinamartini Torino				
1975–76	Berck			(England) Doncaster Panthers	2nd of 4 teams			
1976–77	Caen			(West Germany) SSV Hagen	2nd of 3 teams			
1976–77	Moderne			(Israel) Hapoel Tel Aviv				
1976–77	Berck			(West Germany) Gießen 46ers	1st of 3 teams	Bye	(Italy) Alco Bologna	
1976–77	ESM Challans			(Italy) Cannon Venezia				
1977–78	Moderne			(Greece) Aris	2nd of 4 teams			
1977–78	Nice			(Israel) Hapoel Gvat/Yagur	2nd of 4 teams			
1977–78	Berck			(Spain) Askatuak	2nd of 4 teams			
1977–78	Orthez			(Spain) Juventud Freixenet				
1978–79	Caen			(Spain) Areslux Granollers	2nd of 4 teams			
1978–79	Olympique Antibes			(Spain) Askatuak	4th of 4 teams			
1978–79	Orthez		(Portugal) Ginásio Figueirense	(Greece) Panathinaikos	4th of 4 teams			
1978–79	ESM Challans		(Luxembourg) T71 Dudelange	(Spain) Cotonificio				
1979–80	ASPO Tours			(Switzerland) Nyon	4th of 4 teams			
1979–80	Orthez			(Italy) Jollycolombani Forlì	3rd of 4 teams			
1979–80	Mulhouse		(England) Team Fiat Stars					
1980–81	ASVEL				4th of 4 teams			
1980–81	Stade Français		(Luxembourg) Sparta Bertrange	(Czechoslovakia) Zbrojovka Brno				
1980–81	Caen		(Socialist Federal Republic of Yugoslavia) Partizan					
1980–81	Orthez			(Spain) Inmobanco	2nd of 4 teams			
1981–82	Tours			(Spain) OAR Ferrol	3rd of 4 teams			
1981–82	Orthez			(Belgium) Anderlecht	3rd of 4 teams			
1981–82	Limoges CSP		(Luxembourg) T71 Dudelange	(Greece) Aris	1st of 4 teams	Bye	(Socialist Federal Republic of Yugoslavia) Zadar	(Socialist Federal Republic of Yugoslavia) Šibenka
1981–82	Avignon		(Italy) Acqua Fabia Rieti					
1982–83	Limoges CSP				1st of 4 teams	Bye	(Soviet Union) Dynamo Moscow	(Socialist Federal Republic of Yugoslavia) Šibenka
1982–83	Orthez		(Luxembourg) Amicale Steinsel	(Switzerland) Nyon	2nd of 4 teams			
1982–83	Monaco		(Spain) OAR Ferrol	(Italy) Latte Sole Bologna	2nd of 4 teams			
1982–83	Tours		(Belgium) Frisa Kortrijk	(Netherlands) Elmex Leiden	3rd of 4 teams			
1983–84	Moderne				2nd of 4 teams			
1983–84	Olympique Antibes			(Belgium) Assubel Mariembourg	1st of 4 teams	Bye	(France) Orthez	
1983–84	Orthez			(Greece) AEK	1st of 4 teams	Bye	(France) Olympique Antibes	(Socialist Federal Republic of Yugoslavia) Crvena zvezda
1983–84	Tours			(Turkey) İTÜ	2nd of 4 teams			
1984–85	Olympique Antibes			(Spain) Licor 43				
1984–85	Moderne			(Belgium) Assubel Mariembourg	4th of 4 teams			
1984–85	Stade Français		(Luxembourg) Sparta Bertrange	(Israel) Hapoel Ramat Gan	3rd of 4 teams			
1984–85	Orthez				2nd of 4 teams			
1985–86	ASVEL		(Switzerland) Monthey	(Spain) Caja Alava	3rd of 4 teams			
1985–86	Olympique Antibes		(Israel) Hapoel Holon	(West Germany) SSV Hagen	1st of 4 teams	Bye	(Italy) Banco di Roma Virtus	
1985–86	Orthez				2nd of 4 teams			
1985–86	ESM Challans		(Belgium) Spirale Herstal	(Greece) AEK	4th of 4 teams			
1986–87	Limoges CSP				1st of 4 teams	Bye	(Spain) CAI Zaragoza	(Spain) FC Barcelona
1986–87	ESM Challans			(Hungary) Videoton	3rd of 4 teams			
1986–87	Olympique Antibes			(Spain) Gin MG Sarriá	3rd of 4 teams			
1986–87	Avignon		(Malta) Athleta Juvenis	(Spain) Estudiantes Caja Postal				
1987–88	Monaco		(West Germany) Gießen 46ers	(Turkey) Efes Pilsen	3rd of 4 teams			
1987–88	Racing Club de France		(Belgium) Maccabi Brussels	(Italy) Divarese Varese	2nd of 4 teams			
1987–88	ASVEL			(Israel) Maccabi Haifa	2nd of 4 teams			
1987–88	Olympique Antibes		(Switzerland) SMB Lausanne	(Greece) PAOK				
1988–89	Racing Club de France		(West Germany) Bayer 04 Leverkusen	(Netherlands) Direktbank Den Helder				
1988–89	Orthez		(Switzerland) Bellinzona	(Turkey) Spartak Pleven	3rd of 4 teams			
1988–89	ASVEL		(Greece) PAOK					
1988–89	Nantes		(Belgium) Assubel Mariembourg					
1989–90	Pitch Cholet		(Cyprus) Achilleas Kaimakli	(Hungary) Tungsram	1st of 4 teams	(Italy) Scavolini Pesaro		
1989–90	Pau-Orthez		(Switzerland) Fribourg Olympic	(Iceland) KR Reykjavík	4th of 4 teams			
1989–90	Montpellier		(Hungary) ZTE	(Italy) Phonola Caserta				
1989–90	Monaco		(England) Oldham Celtics	(Spain) CAI Zaragoza				
1990–91	Olympique Antibes		(Portugal) Beira-Mar	(Greece) Panathinaikos				
1990–91	Pau-Orthez		(Belgium) Sunair Oostende					
1990–91	Mulhouse		(Sweden) Solna IF	(Turkey) Efes Pilsen	2nd of 4 teams	(Socialist Federal Republic of Yugoslavia) Zadar	(Italy) Shampoo Clear Cantù	
1990–91	Gravelines		(Netherlands) Nashua EBBC	(Spain) Estudiantes Caja Postal				
1991–92	Pitch Cholet			(Ukraine) Budivelnyk	2nd of 4 teams	(Italy) Scavolini Pesaro		
1991–92	Saint-Quentin		(Greece) Panathinaikos					
1991–92	Racing Club de France		(Finland) Saab Uudenkaupungin Urheilijat	(Belgium) Bobcat Gent	2nd of 4 teams	(Italy) il Messaggero Roma		
1991–92	Reims Champagne		(Portugal) Ovarense	(Italy) il Messaggero Roma				
1992–93	Gravelines		(Israel) Maccabi Haifa	(Greece) Fyrogenis AEK	4th of 4 teams			
1992–93	Olympique Antibes		(Turkey) Çukurova Üniversitesi	(Hungary) MOL Szolnoki Olajbányász	3rd of 4 teams			
1992–93	ASVEL		(Belgium) Spirou Charleroi					
1992–93	CRO Lyon	(Iceland) Valur	(Germany) EnBW Ludwigsburg					
1993–94	Olympique Antibes		(Czech Republic) Tonak Nový Jičín	(Poland) Lech Poznań	1st of 4 teams	(Italy) Recoaro Milano		
1993–94	Gravelines		(Ukraine) TIIT Kharkov					
1993–94	PSG Racing		(Hungary) ZTE	(Greece) Nikas Peristeri				
1993–94	JDA Dijon		(Iceland) Haukar	(Italy) Pfizer Reggio Calabria				
1994–95	Pitch Cholet		(Austria) Montan Kapfenberg	(Turkey) PTT	4th of 4 teams			
1994–95	Pau-Orthez			(Croatia) Šibenik	1st of 4 teams	(Turkey) Ülker	(Italy) Stefanel Milano	
1994–95	JDA Dijon	(Luxembourg) Sparta Bertrange	(Croatia) Zrinjevac	(Germany) Alba Berlin				
1994–95	PSG Racing		(Portugal) Beira-Mar	(Turkey) Ülker				
1995–96	Pitch Cholet		(Lithuania) Alita	(Greece) Soulis Sporting				
1995–96	JDA Dijon	(Czech Republic) CSA Sparta Praha	(Portugal) Oliveirense	(Turkey) Fenerbahçe				
1995–96	PSG Racing	(England) Haribo London Towers						
1995–96	ASVEL	(England) Manchester Giants	(Israel) Hapoel Tel Aviv	(Slovenia) Bavaria Wolltex	1st of 4 teams	(Germany) Alba Berlin	(Italy) Stefanel Milano	
1996–97	Levallois		3rd of 4 teams					
1996–97	JDA Dijon		2nd of 4 teams	(Italy) Benetton Treviso				
1996–97	SLUC Nancy		2nd of 4 teams	(Spain) Taugrés				
1996–97	Montpellier		3rd of 4 teams					
1997–98	Cholet		1st of 4 teams	(Germany) TBB Trier	(Italy) Varese Roosters	(France) JDA Dijon	(Federal Republic of Yugoslavia) Crvena zvezda	
1997–98	Montpellier		2nd of 4 teams	(Israel) Hapoel Galil Elyon				
1997–98	SLUC Nancy		1st of 4 teams	(Turkey) Kombassan Konya				
1997–98	JDA Dijon		2nd of 4 teams	(Ukraine) Dendi Basket	(Poland) Stal Bobrek Bytom	(France) Cholet		
1998–99	PSG Racing		3rd of 4 teams					
1998–99	JDA Dijon		1st of 4 teams	(Poland) Ericsson Bobry Bytom	(Greece) Apollon Patras	(Greece) Panionios		
1998–99	Le Mans Sarthe		3rd of 4 teams					
1998–99	Besançon		3rd of 4 teams					
1999–00	Le Mans Sarthe		4th of 4 teams					
1999–00	Limoges CSP		1st of 4 teams	(Russia) UNICS	(Ukraine) CSKA Kyiv	(Turkey) Türk Telekom	(Spain) Casademont Girona	(Spain) Unicaja
1999–00	SLUC Nancy		1st of 4 teams	(Ukraine) CSKA Kyiv				
1999–00	Olympique Antibes		3rd of 4 teams					
2000–01	Cholet		(Belgium) Bingoal Bree					
2000–01	SIG		(Germany) Herzogtel Trier	3rd of 4 teams				
2000–01	Le Mans Sarthe		(Portugal) CAB Madeira	4th of 4 teams				
2000–01	JDA Dijon		(Switzerland) Benetton Fribourg Olympic	2nd of 4 teams	(Spain) Unicaja			
2001–02	JDA Dijon		(Luxembourg) Etzella	2nd of 4 teams	(Israel) Maccabi Ness Ra'anana	(France) SLUC Nancy		
2001–02	SLUC Nancy		(Germany) StadtSport Braunschweig	1st of 4 teams	(Germany) Bayer Giants Leverkusen	(France) JDA Dijon	(Slovenia) Pivovarna Laško	(Russia) Lokomotiv Mineralnye Vody
2001–02	Élan Chalon		(Portugal) Oliveirense	4th of 4 teams				
2001–02	Racing Paris		(Belgium) Euphony Liège	3rd of 4 teams				

== See also ==
European basketball clubs in European and worldwide competitions from:

- Croatia
- Czechoslovakia
- Greece
- Israel
- Italy
- Russia
- Spain
- Turkey
- USSR
- Yugoslavia
