= Duane Johnson =

American basketball player (born 1991)

No. 12 – Mogi das Cruzes Basquete
- Position: Forward
- League: Novo Basquete Brasil

Personal information
- Born: April 2, 1991 (age 35) Lansdowne, Pennsylvania, U.S.
- Listed height: 6 ft 7 in (2.01 m)
- Listed weight: 190 lb (86 kg)

Career information
- High school: Penn Wood (Lansdowne, Pennsylvania)
- College: East Stroudsburg (2009–2013)
- NBA draft: 2013: undrafted
- Playing career: 2014–present

Career history
- 2014: Corio Bay Stingrays
- 2015–2016: DCU Saints
- 2016–2020: Black Star Mersch
- 2020–2022: BBC Arantia Larochette
- 2022–2023: Maccabi Ma'ale Adumim
- 2023–2025: União Corinthians
- 2025–present: Mogi das Cruzes Basquete

Career highlights
- LBBL Defensive Player of the Year (2022); Irish League All-Star First Pick (2016); Irish League scoring champion (2016); First-team All-PSAC East Division (2012); 2× Second-team All-PSAC East Division (2011, 2013)

Duane Alexander Johnson (born April 2, 1991) is an American professional basketball player for Mogi das Cruzes Basquete of the Novo Basquete Brasil. He played college basketball for the East Stroudsburg Warriors, where he was part of four straight PSAC Final Four teams and three NCAA Division II Tournament teams. He has since played professionally in Australia, Ireland, Luxembourg and Israel.

== High school career ==
Johnson was born Lansdowne, Pennsylvania. He attended Penn Wood High School in Lansdowne, where he was a two-time first-team All-Delaware County honoree playing for coach Clyde Jones. As a senior in 2008–09, he led Penn Wood in scoring (13.7 ppg), rebounding (7.0 rpg) and blocked shots (1.9 bpg), and was team captain. He subsequently earned second-team All-District I and second-team AAAA all-state honors as a senior, helping the Patriots finish with an overall record of 28–4. On March 21, 2009, he helped guide Penn Wood to their first state basketball title in school history, defeating York William Penn 72–53. In the title game, Johnson recorded 20 points, 10 rebounds and four steals. Johnson finished his high school career on Penn Wood's 1,000-point scorers list with 1,082 total points.

== College career ==
As a freshman at East Stroudsburg in 2009–10, Johnson played in all 30 games for a 24–6 Warriors team that competed in the PSAC Final Four and NCAA tournament. He averaged 6.9 points and 3.4 rebounds in 17.8 minutes per game, and earned three PSAC East Freshman of the Week honors. In his third game for the Warriors, he scored a season-high 16 points.

As a sophomore in 2010–11, Johnson earned second-team All-PSAC East honors after leading the Warriors in scoring (12.4 ppg) and ranking third in rebounding (4.9 rpg). He played in 28 games and made 27 starts, and helped the Warriors reach their second straight PSAC Final Four. He also earned Pocono Classic All-Tournament Team honors. In the second last game of the season, he scored a season-high 26 points.

As a junior in 2011–12, Johnson earned first-team All-PSAC East honors and helped the Warriors win the PSAC championship, guiding them back to the NCAA tournament for the second time in three years. He appeared in 32 games for the Warriors and started 31 of them, averaging 12.4 points, 6.2 rebounds, 2.4 assists and 1.4 steals in 32.7 minutes per game. On February 4, he scored a career-high 29 points against Kutztown.

As a senior in 2012–13, Johnson earned second-team All-PSAC East honors after helping the Warriors to a third NCAA tournament appearance in four years, and a fourth straight PSAC Final Four appearance. He was subsequently named ESU's Male Senior Athlete of the Year and ESU's Coaches Award recipient alongside Terrance King. He started in all 28 games for the Warriors as a senior, averaging 14.1 points, 6.2 rebounds, 1.9 assists and 1.5 steals in 31.5 minutes per game. During the season, the team recorded a school record-tying 14-game winning streak, and had a nine-game road winning streak, the latter coming to an end one game shy from tying a school record set between 1926 and 1928. Both streaks came to an end on February 16 against Shippensburg, a game which saw Johnson tie his career high of 29 points.

In four years at ESU, Johnson and teammate Terrance King led the Warriors to unprecedented success, including an 82–37 record from 2009–10 through 2012–13. Johnson left ESU seventh in career points (1,347), ninth in rebounds (608), fourth in steals (148) and eighth in blocks (90), and was just the third three-time All-PSAC East selection in program history. In addition, Johnson played 3,267 career minutes, the most by an ESU player since 1990, and led the Warriors in minutes played as a sophomore, junior and senior.

=== College statistics ===
Year	Team	GP	GS	MPG	FG%	3P%	FT%	RPG	APG	SPG	BPG	PPG
2009–10	East Stroudsburg	30	0	17.8	.471	.417	.701	3.4	1.2	.7	.6	6.9
2010–11	East Stroudsburg	28	27	28.8	.504	.341	.744	4.9	1.8	1.5	.7	12.4
2011–12	East Stroudsburg	32	31	32.7	.435	.254	.752	6.2	2.4	1.4	.9	12.4
2012–13	East Stroudsburg	28	28	31.5	.441	.314	.787	6.2	1.9	1.5	.9	14.1
Career		118	86	27.7	.459	.312	.753	5.2	1.8	1.3	.8	11.4

== Professional career ==
=== Corio Bay Stingrays (2014) ===
In December 2013, Johnson signed a professional contract with the Corio Bay Stingrays in Australia for the 2014 Big V season. His athleticism was highly rated to begin his career and quickly established himself as a good defensive player. In his debut for the Stingrays on March 15, he scored 25 points in a 102–86 win over the Ringwood Hawks. On June 28, he recorded 30 points and 14 rebounds in a 97–90 win over the Bulleen Boomers. He had a second 30-point effort on July 20 in a 100–98 win over the Waverley Falcons. He helped the Stingrays finish the regular season in second place with a 22–2 record before leading them to the best-of-three grand final series against the Ringwood Hawks. In game one, Johnson recorded 25 points and nine rebounds in a 92–85 win. The Stingrays went on to lose the series 2–1, with Johnson scoring 17 points in game two and 13 points in game three. In 27 games, he averaged 20.4 points, 9.2 rebounds, 1.8 assists, 1.1 steals and 1.3 blocks per game. He was subsequently nominated for All-Star forward selection, but ultimately missed out on the All-Star Five.

=== DCU Saints (2015–2016) ===
On November 20, 2015, Johnson signed with DCU Saints in Ireland for the rest of the 2015–16 Premier League season. He made his debut the following day, recording 16 points and 30 rebounds in a 73–70 win over UCD Marian. In his next game for the team on December 5, Johnson had 18 points and 26 rebounds in an 80–67 National Cup loss to Marian. In his third game on December 13, he recorded 40 points and 26 rebounds in a 96–78 regular-season win over UL Eagles. On December 20, he scored 39 points in a 100–90 win over UCC Demons. He was subsequently named the league's Player of the Month for December. Saints finished the regular season in sixth place with a 7–11 record, going 7–5 with Johnson in the line-up after starting 0–6. In 12 games, he averaged league-leading numbers with 26.2 points and 18.7 rebounds, in addition to 3.9 assists, 2.6 steals and 3.1 blocks in 38.7 minutes per game. He subsequently earned Premier League All-Star First Pick honors.

=== Black Star Mersch (2016–2020) ===
For the 2016–17 season, Johnson moved to Luxembourg to play for Black Star Mersch in the Nationale 2. In January 2017, he suffered a broken leg and missed the rest of the season. He continued on with Black Star in 2017–18, 2018–19, and 2019–20. In February 2020, Black Star were elevated to the first-tiered Luxembourg Basketball League (LBBL), where in five games to complete the 2019–20 season, Johnson averaged 30.0 points, 14.8 rebounds, 4.8 assists and 2.4 steals per game.

=== BBC Arantia Larochette (2020–2022) ===
In June 2020, Johnson signed with BBC Arantia Larochette of the LBBL, returning to Luxembourg for a fifth season. He missed Arantia's play-in game after injuring his foot in the final regular season game. In 21 games during the 2020–21 season, he averaged 21.6 points, 10.1 rebounds, 3.3 assists and 2.6 steals per game.

On April 7, 2021, Johnson signed a contract extension with Arantia Larochette for the 2021–22 season. On November 6, 2021, he scored 46 points in a 79–76 win over AB Contern. He helped Arantia reach the Luxembourg Cup final, where they lost 84–65 to Basket Esch despite Johnson's 22 points and 12 rebounds. He was named the LBBL Defensive Player of the Year. In 23 games, he averaged 24.3 points, 9.9 rebounds, 3.2 assists, 2.6 steals and 1.4 blocks per game.

=== Maccabi Ma'ale Adumim (2022–2023) ===
In July 2022, Johnson signed with Maccabi Ma'ale Adumim of the Israeli National League. In 29 games in the 2022–23 season, he averaged 14.6 points, 7.3 rebounds, 2.5 assists, 1.5 steals and 1.0 blocks per game.

=== União Corinthians (2023–2025) ===
In September 2023, Johnson signed with União Corinthians of the Novo Basquete Brasil (NBB). He scored a season-high 29 points in February 2024. In 36 games, he averaged 14.6 points, 7.0 rebounds, 3.8 assists and 1.7 steals per game.

In July 2024, Johnson re-signed with União Corinthians. He scored a season-high 37 points in October 2024. In February 2025, he was selected for the NBB All-Star Game. In 38 games, he averaged 14.9 points, 4.3 rebounds, 3.0 assists and 1.5 steals per game.

=== Mogi das Cruzes Basquete (2025–present) ===
On July 31, 2025, Johnson signed with Mogi das Cruzes Basquete of the NBB for the 2025–26 season. He helped Mogi reach the finals of the Campeonato Paulista de Basquete Masculino, where they lost 3–0 to Sesi Franca in October 2025. In 20 Paulista games, he averaged 11.5 points, 4.2 rebounds, 1.4 assists and 1.1 steals per game. After appearing in two NBB games on October 23 and October 25 to begin the season, he was deactivated in early November for conditioning reasons. He was active again by late December, playing 12 games between December 23 and February 22, but then missed the entire month of March. He finish the season playing 12 games across April and May. In 26 games, he averaged 9.1 points, 3.4 rebounds and 1.6 assists per game.

== Personal life ==
Johnson's first daughter was born in Santa Cruz do Sul during his first season in Brazil.

Johnson's nickname is The Rock due to having a similar name to former WWE wrestler, Dwayne Johnson.
