= 2001–02 FIBA Korać Cup =

- League: FIBA Korać Cup
- Sport: Basketball

Finals
- Champions: (France) SLUC Nancy
- Runners-up: (Russia) Lokomotiv Mineralnye Vody

FIBA Korać Cup seasons
- ← 2000–01 2002–03 FECC →

The last, 31st edition of the FIBA Korać Cup occurred between 25 September 2001 and 17 April 2002. The tournament was won by Nancy, who beat Lokomotiv Rostov in the final.

The competition was replaced with FIBA Europe Champions Cup in season 2002–2003 and with FIBA EuroChallenge in later seasons.

== Team allocation ==
The labels in the parentheses show National league position (after Playoffs) for the each team applied for the competition (1st, 2nd, etc.)

Teams
(Belgium) Telindus Racing Antwerpen (3rd)	(France) SLUC Nancy (6th)	(Russia) Khimki (7th)	(Italy) Euro Roseto (8th)
(Belgium) Dexia Union Mons-Hainaut (4th)	(France) Elan Chalon (7th)	(Russia) EvrAz (4th, SL B)	(Italy) Müller Verona (10th)
(Belgium) Stretch-Top Bingoal Bree (6th)	(France) Paris Basket Racing (8th)	(Austria) Montan Bears Kapfenberg (1st)	(Poland) Prokom Trefl (3rd)
(Belgium) Euphony Liège (7th)	(Germany) Bayer Giants Leverkusen (3rd)	(Austria) Wörthersee Piraten (2nd)	(Poland) Hoop Blanchy Pruszkow (4th)
(Croatia) Triglav Osiguranje Rijeka (3rd)	(Germany) Avitos Gießen (4th)	(Austria) SÜBA Sankt Pölten (9th)	(San Marino) Pallacanestro Titano
(Croatia) Dona Dubrava (5th)	(Germany) StadtSport Braunschweig (6th)	(Hungary) Kaposvari (1st)	(San Marino) Borgo Maggiore Basket
(Croatia) Zagreb (6th)	(Germany) Herzogtel Trier (9th)	(Hungary) Atomerömü (2nd)	(Slovenia) Geoplin Slovan (3rd)
(Croatia) Zrinjevac (7th)	(Luxembourg) AB Contern (1st)	(Hungary) Debreceni Vadkakasok (13th)	(Slovenia) Pivovarna Laško (4th)
(Cyprus) AEL Limassol (2nd)	(Luxembourg) Etzella (2nd)	(Turkey) Fenerbahçe (5th)	(Spain) Jabones Pardo Fuenlabrada (7th)
(Cyprus) Apollon Limassol (3rd)	Racing Club Luxembourg (3rd)	(Turkey) Beşiktaş (7th)	(Spain) Fórum Valladolid (8th)
(Cyprus) APOEL (4th)	(Luxembourg) Amicale Steinsel (4th)	(Turkey) Büyük Kolej (9th)	(Federal Republic of Yugoslavia) Hemofarm (4th)
(Cyprus) AEK Larnaca (5th)	(Portugal) Oliveirense (2nd)	(Bosnia and Herzegovina) Feal Široki (2nd)	(Federal Republic of Yugoslavia) Zdravlje (6th)
(Czech Republic) Opava (2nd)	(Portugal) Ovarense Aerosoles (3rd)	(Bosnia and Herzegovina) Čelik (5th)	(Bulgaria) Lukoil Academic (5th)
(Czech Republic) Mlekarna Kunin (3rd)	(Portugal) Porto (4th)	(Greece) Maroussi Telestet (7th)	(Georgia (country)) Maccabi Brinkford Tbilisi (4th)
(Czech Republic) BVV ŽS Brno (4th)	(Portugal) CAB Madeira (8th)	(Greece) PAOK (8th)	(Netherlands) EiffelTowers Nijmegen (7th)
(Czech Republic) Sparta Praha (5th)	(Russia) Lokomotiv Mineralnye Vody (3rd)	(Israel) Maccabi Ness Ra'anana (5th)	(Romania) West Petrom Arad (1st)
(France) JDA Dijon (5th)	(Russia) Avtodor Saratov (5th)	(Israel) Maccabi Ironi Ramat-Gan (6th)	

== Preliminary round ==
Team 1	Agg.	Team 2	1st leg	2nd leg
Kaposvári (Hungary)	170–138	(Croatia) Triglav Osiguranje Rijeka	90–73	80–65
Borgo Maggiore Basket (San Marino)	78–244	(Slovenia) Geoplin Slovan	47–121	31–123
Pallacanestro Titano (San Marino)	119–168	(Austria) Wörthersee Piraten	54–76	65–92

== First round ==
Team 1	Agg.	Team 2	1st leg	2nd leg
Wörthersee Piraten (Austria)	141–186	(Italy) Müller Verona	59–103	82–83
Feal Široki (Bosnia and Herzegovina)	155–172	(Greece) Maroussi Telestet	94–85	61–87
Oliveirense (Portugal)	143–152	(France) Élan Chalon	76–73	67–79
Euphony Liège (Belgium)	136–171	(France) Paris Basket Racing	62–83	74–88
Maccabi Brinkford Tbilisi (Georgia (country))	155–286	(Russia) Avtodor Saratov	91–141	64–145
Amicale Steinsel (Luxembourg)	118–222	(Portugal) Porto	65–109	53–113
Montan Bears Kapfenberg (Austria)	124–152	(Federal Republic of Yugoslavia) Hemofarm	56–66	58–86
Apollon Limassol (Cyprus)	136–164	(Greece) PAOK	65–69	71–95
EvrAz (Russia)	148–140	(Turkey) Fenerbahçe	71–62	77–78
Kaposvári (Hungary)	189–179	(Poland) Hoop Blachy Pruszyński	96–81	93–98
Sparta Praha (Czech Republic)	151–213	(Slovenia) Pivovarna Laško	86–111	65–102
Etzella (Luxembourg)	105–227	(France) JDA Dijon	40–118	65–109
Opava (Czech Republic)	180–154	(Croatia) Zagreb	96–72	84–82
AEK Larnaca (Cyprus)	138–165	(Israel) Maccabi Ironi Ramat-Gan	77–87	61–78
Lukoil Academic (Bulgaria)	129–141	(Russia) Khimki	74–76	55–65
Geoplin Slovan (Slovenia)	172–131	(Croatia) Zrinjevac	87–64	85–67
CAB Madeira (Portugal)	155–162	(Spain) Fórum Valladolid	85–84	70–78
Stretch-Top Bingoal Bree (Belgium)	167–176	(Spain) Jabones Pardo Fuenlabrada	77–92	90–84
Dexia Mons-Hainaut (Belgium)	188–179	(Germany) Herzogtel Trier	87–87	101–92
Debreceni Vadkakasok (Hungary)	159–173	(Czech Republic) Mlekarna Kunin	81–95	78–78
EiffelTowers Nijmegen (Netherlands)	143–168	(Belgium) Telindus Racing Antwerpen	60–80	83–88
Zdravlje (Federal Republic of Yugoslavia)	158–161	(Turkey) Beşiktaş	88–77	70–84
Racing Club Luxembourg	116–220	(Germany) Bayer Giants Leverkusen	70–111	46–109
APOEL (Cyprus)	142–168	(Israel) Maccabi Ness Ra'anana	70–84	72–84
AEL Limassol (Cyprus)	40–0	(Italy) Euro Roseto	20–0	20–0
StadtSport Braunschweig (Germany)	154–196	(France) SLUC Nancy	74–93	80–103
Avitos Gießen (Germany)	168–170	(Portugal) Ovarense Aerosoles	90–85	78–85
BVV ŽS Brno (Czech Republic)	144–208	(Poland) Prokom Trefl Sopot	84–103	60–105
West Petrom Arad (Romania)	112–209	(Russia) Lokomotiv Mineralnye Vody	65–105	47–107
Čelik (Bosnia and Herzegovina)	117–131	(Turkey) Büyük Kolej	54–68	63–63
Contern (Luxembourg)	150–206	(Austria) Süba Sankt Pölten	68–112	82–94
Atomerőmű (Hungary)	175–135	(Croatia) Dona Dubrava	89–68	86–67

== Round of 32 ==
Key to colors
Top two places in each group advance to round of 16

=== Group A ===
	Team	Pld	Pts	W	L	PF	PA
1	(Spain) Jabones Pardo Fuenlabrada	6	9	3	3	501	465
2	(Germany) Bayer Giants Leverkusen	6	9	3	3	458	445
3	(Belgium) Dexia Union Mons-Hainaut	6	9	3	3	454	479
4	(France) Élan Chalon	6	9	3	3	431	455

=== Group B ===
	Team	Pld	Pts	W	L	PF	PA
1	(France) SLUC Nancy	6	11	5	1	555	511
2	(Portugal) Porto	6	9	3	3	547	578
3	(Italy) Müller Verona	6	8	2	4	521	520
4	(Belgium) Telindus Racing Antwerpen	6	8	2	4	486	500

=== Group C ===
	Team	Pld	Pts	W	L	PF	PA
1	(Greece) Maroussi Telestet	6	11	5	1	464	468
2	(France) JDA Dijon	6	9	3	3	486	453
3	(Portugal) Ovarense Aerosoles	6	8	2	4	447	463
4	(Spain) Fórum Valladolid	6	8	2	4	451	464

=== Group D ===
	Team	Pld	Pts	W	L	PF	PA
1	(Israel) Maccabi Ness Ra'anana	6	10	4	2	399	348
2	(Federal Republic of Yugoslavia) Hemofarm	6	9	3	3	436	452
3	(France) Paris Basket Racing	6	9	3	3	378	388
4	(Turkey) Beşiktaş	6	8	2	4	463	488

=== Group E ===
	Team	Pld	Pts	W	L	PF	PA
1	(Russia) Lokomotiv Mineralnye Vody	6	11	5	1	549	438
2	(Israel) Maccabi Ironi Ramat-Gan	6	10	4	2	468	474
3	(Greece) PAOK	6	9	3	3	464	444
4	(Cyprus) AEL Limassol	6	6	0	6	475	600

=== Group F ===
	Team	Pld	Pts	W	L	PF	PA
1	(Czech Republic) Opava	6	11	5	1	560	510
2	(Hungary) Atomerőmű	6	10	4	2	513	489
3	(Russia) Khimki	6	9	3	3	530	525
4	(Turkey) Büyük Kolej	6	6	0	6	459	538

=== Group G ===
	Team	Pld	Pts	W	L	PF	PA
1	(Poland) Prokom Trefl Sopot	6	11	5	1	569	495
2	(Slovenia) Pivovarna Laško	6	10	4	2	555	514
3	(Czech Republic) Mlekarna Kunin	6	9	3	3	560	565
4	(Russia) EvrAz	6	6	0	6	467	577

=== Group H ===
	Team	Pld	Pts	W	L	PF	PA
1	(Russia) Avtodor Saratov	6	10	4	2	564	487
2	(Hungary) Kaposvári	6	10	4	2	531	483
3	(Slovenia) Geoplin Slovan	6	10	4	2	478	466
4	(Austria) Süba Sankt Pölten	6	6	0	6	460	597

== Playoffs ==
Round of 16
(German Basketball Federation) Bayer Giants Leverkusen	87	95	182
(French Federation of Basketball) SLUC Nancy	80	104	184
(French Federation of Basketball) JDA Dijon	71	64	135
(Israeli Basketball Association) Maccabi Ness Ra'anana	66	68	134
(Israeli Basketball Association) Maccabi Ironi Ramat-Gan	86	69	155
(Czech Basketball Federation) Opava	64	80	144
(Basketball Federation of Slovenia) Pivovarna Laško	96	81	177
(Russian Basketball Federation) Avtodor Saratov	74	92	166
(Portuguese Basketball Federation) Porto	85	71	156
(Spanish Basketball Federation) Jabones Pardo Fuenlabrada	85	101	186
(Basketball Federation of Yugoslavia) Hemofarm	69	71	140
(Hellenic Basketball Federation) Maroussi Telestet	71	85	156
(Hungarian Basketball Federation) Atomerőmű	88	89	177
(Russian Basketball Federation) Lokomotiv Mineralnye Vody	90	92	182
(Hungarian Basketball Federation) Kaposvári	78	95	173
(Polish Basketball Federation) Prokom Trefl Sopot	88	98	186

Quarter-finals
(French Federation of Basketball) SLUC Nancy	95	66	161
(French Federation of Basketball) JDA Dijon	72	79	151
(Israeli Basketball Association) Maccabi Ironi Ramat-Gan	58	65	123
(Basketball Federation of Slovenia) Pivovarna Laško	68	75	143
(Spanish Basketball Federation) Jabones Pardo Fuenlabrada	84	63	147
(Hellenic Basketball Federation) Maroussi Telestet	82	73	155
(Russian Basketball Federation) Lokomotiv Mineralnye Vody	74	93	167
(Polish Basketball Federation) Prokom Trefl Sopot	87	66	153

Semi-finals
(French Federation of Basketball) SLUC Nancy	89	83	172
(Basketball Federation of Slovenia) Pivovarna Laško	58	94	152
(Hellenic Basketball Federation) Maroussi Telestet	91	67	158
(Russian Basketball Federation) Lokomotiv Mineralnye Vody	86	75	161

Finals
(French Federation of Basketball) SLUC Nancy	98	74	172
(Russian Basketball Federation) Lokomotiv Mineralnye Vody	72	95	167

=== Round of 16 ===
Team 1	Agg.	Team 2	1st leg	2nd leg
Bayer Giants Leverkusen (Germany)	182–184	(France) SLUC Nancy	87–80	95–104
Porto (Portugal)	156–186	(Spain) Jabones Pardo Fuenlabrada	85–85	71–101
JDA Dijon (France)	135–134	(Israel) Maccabi Ness Ra'anana	71–66	64–68
Hemofarm (Federal Republic of Yugoslavia)	140–156	(Greece) Maroussi Telestet	69–71	71–85
Maccabi Ironi Ramat-Gan (Israel)	155–144	(Czech Republic) Opava	86–64	69–80
Atomerőmű (Hungary)	177–182	(Russia) Lokomotiv Mineralnye Vody	88–90	89–92
Pivovarna Laško (Slovenia)	177–166	(Russia) Avtodor Saratov	96–74	81–92
Kaposvári (Hungary)	173–186	(Poland) Prokom Trefl Sopot	78–88	95–98

=== Quarter finals ===
Team 1	Agg.	Team 2	1st leg	2nd leg
SLUC Nancy (France)	161–151	(France) JDA Dijon	95–72	66–79
Jabones Pardo Fuenlabrada (Spain)	147–155	(Greece) Maroussi Telestet	84–82	63–73
Maccabi Ironi Ramat-Gan (Israel)	123–143	(Slovenia) Pivovarna Laško	58–68	65–75
Lokomotiv Mineralnye Vody (Russia)	167–153	(Poland) Prokom Trefl Sopot	74–87	93–66

=== Semi finals ===
Team 1	Agg.	Team 2	1st leg	2nd leg
Maroussi Telestet (Greece)	158–161	(Russia) Lokomotiv Mineralnye Vody	91–86	67–75
SLUC Nancy (France)	172–152	(Slovenia) Pivovarna Laško	89–58	83–94

=== Finals ===
Team 1	Agg.	Team 2	1st leg	2nd leg
SLUC Nancy (France)	172–167	(Russia) Lokomotiv Mineralnye Vody	98–72	74–95

== Rosters ==
(France) SLUC Nancy : Joseph Gomis, Stevin Smith, Goran Bošković, Fabien Dubos, Vincent Masingue; Cyril Julian (C), Ross J. Land, Maxime Zianveni. Coach: Sylvain Lautié
(Russia) Lokomotiv M.Vody: James Robinson, Igor Kudelin, Goran Jagodnik, Tony Farmer, Eurelijus Zukasukas; Andrej Veditchev (C), Vojkan Bencic, Andrej Tsjpachev, Vladislav Konovalov. Coach: Anatolij Sukhachev

2001–02 FIBA Korać Cup Champions

SLUC Nancy
1st title

== See also ==
- 2001–02 Euroleague
- 2001–02 FIBA Saporta Cup
