= Luxembourg Basketball Federation =

- Founded: 1934; 92 years ago
- Affiliation: FIBA Europe
- Headquarters: Strassen
- President: Samy Picard

Official website
- luxembourg.basketball

The Luxembourg Basketball Federation (Luxembourgish: Lëtzebuerger basketballfederatioun, French: Fédération Luxembourgeoise de Basketball, German: Luxemburger Basketballföderation) also known as FLBB, is the governing body of basketball in Luxembourg. It was founded in 1934, and became members of FIBA in 1946.

The Luxembourg Basketball Federation operates the Luxembourg men's national team and Luxembourg women's national team. They organise national competitions in Luxembourg, for both the men's and women's senior teams and also the youth national basketball teams.

The top professional league in Luxembourg is the Total League.

== Current Teams ==
- AB Contern
- Amicale Steesel
- Arantia Larochette
- AS Soleuvre
- Avanti Mondorf 2000
- Bascharage Hedgehogs
- Basket Esch
- BBC KÄLDALL
- Berbourg Espérants Pirates
- Black Frogs Schieren
- Black Star Mersch
- Diekirch
- Etzella Ettelbruck
- Gréngewald Hueschtert
- Kehlen
- Kordall Steelers
- Les Sangliers Wooltz
- Mambra Mamer
- Mess
- Musel Pikes
- Nitia Bettembourg
- North Fox
- Racing Luxembourg
- Rebound Préizerdaul
- Red Miners Käldall
- Résidence Walferdange
- Sparta Bertrange
- Special Olympics Luxembourg
- T71 Dudelange
- Telstar Hesperange
- US Heffingen
- VIBBALL Echternach
- Zesummen Aktiv

== See also ==
- Luxembourg men's national basketball team
- Luxembourg men's national under-20 basketball team
- Luxembourg men's national under-18 basketball team
- Luxembourg men's national under-16 basketball team
- Luxembourg women's national basketball team
- Luxembourg women's national under-20 basketball team
- Luxembourg women's national under-18 basketball team
- Luxembourg women's national under-16 basketball team
