= Stephen Dennis =

American professional basketball player

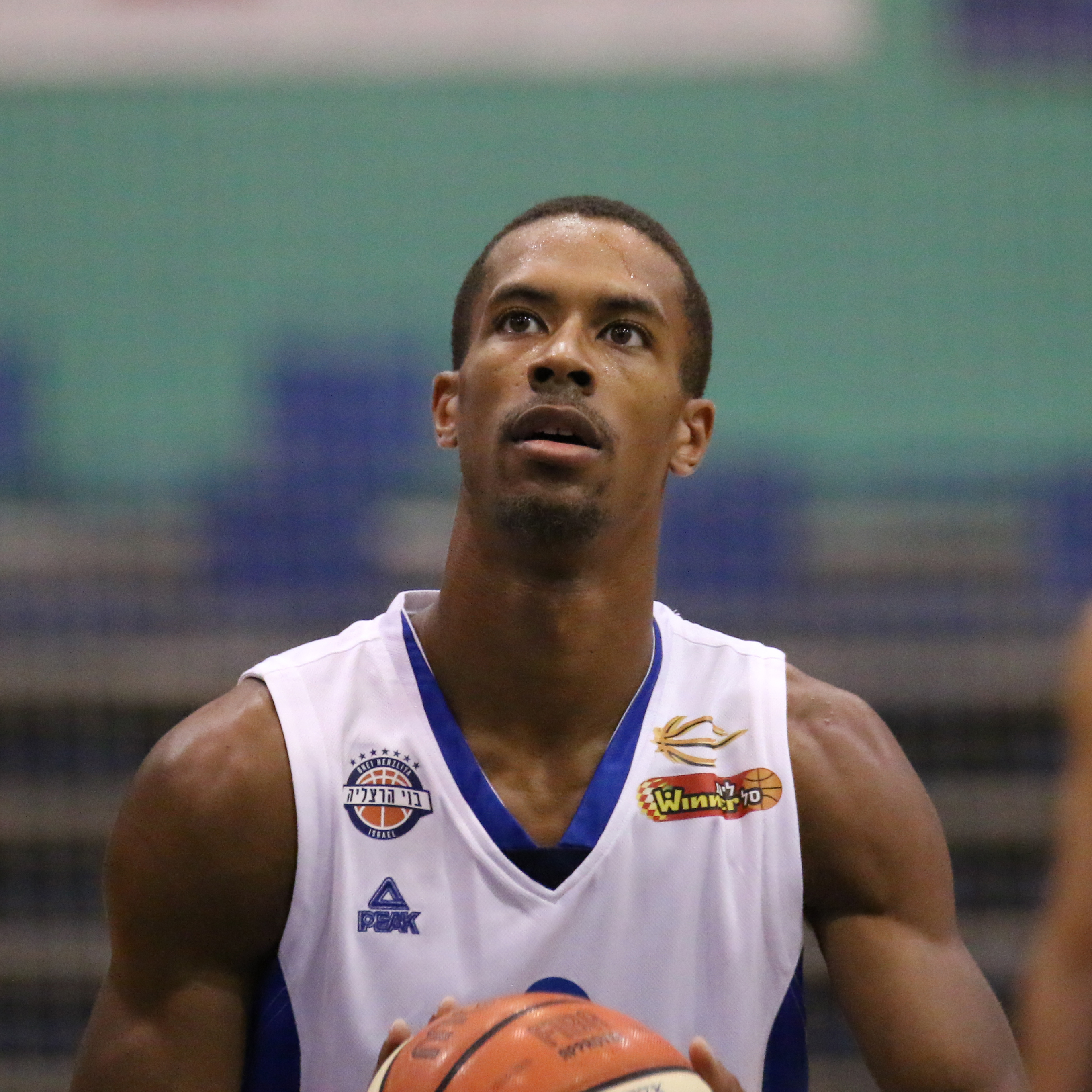
- Dennis with Bnei Herzliya in October 2016

Personal information
- Born: October 2, 1987 (age 39) West Chester, Pennsylvania
- Listed height: 6 ft 6 in (1.98 m)
- Listed weight: 180 lb (82 kg)

Career information
- High school: Henderson (West Chester, Pennsylvania)
- College: Kutztown (2006–2010)
- NBA draft: 2010: undrafted
- Playing career: 2010–2020
- Position: Point guard / shooting guard

Career history
- 2010–2011: Bakersfield Jam
- 2011–2012: Phantoms Braunschweig
- 2012–2013: Bakersfield Jam
- 2014–2015: Melbourne United
- 2015–2017: Bnei Herzliya
- 2018–2019: Elitzur Netanya
- 2019–2020: Luxembourg Racing Club

Career highlights
- NCAA Division II Player of the Year (2010); First-team NCAA Division II All-American (2010)
- Stats at Basketball Reference

Stephen Dennis (born October 2, 1987) is an American professional basketball player who last played for Racing Luxembourg of the Total League. He played college basketball for Kutztown University of Pennsylvania before playing professionally in the NBA D-League, Germany, Australia, Israel and Luxembourg.

== College career ==
Dennis, a 6'6" guard from West Chester, Pennsylvania, played college basketball at Kutztown University of Pennsylvania. While there, he was a four-year starter and made Pennsylvania State Athletic Conference (PSAC) all-league teams each of his four seasons with the Golden Bears. As a freshman, Dennis was named PSAC rookie of the year and was a second team all-conference selection. For the next three years, he was a mainstay on the All-PSAC first team. As a senior in the 2009–10 season, Dennis averaged over 26 points per game and was named the Division II National Player of the Year and a first team All-American by the member schools' Sports Information Directors. Dennis graduated as Kutztown's all-time leading scorer, netting 2,406 points for his career. Dennis also left as the school's all-time leader in field goals (850), free throws (621) and assists (447), as well as establishing the school's single-season scoring mark with 817 points in his senior season.

== Professional career ==
Dennis went undrafted in the 2010 NBA draft. On September 27, 2010, he signed with the Los Angeles Clippers. However, he was later waived by the Clippers on October 9, 2010. In November 2010, he was acquired by the Bakersfield Jam as an affiliate player.

In July 2011, Dennis signed a two-year deal with Phantoms Braunschweig of Germany. In January 2012, he suffered a season-ending injury. In 2011–12, he played 18 games, averaging 8.4 points, 2.7 rebounds and 2.5 assists per game.

In July 2012, Dennis parted ways with Phantoms Braunschweig and joined the Brooklyn Nets for the 2012 Orlando Summer League. On September 17, 2012, he signed with the Nets. However, he was later waived by the Nets on October 23, 2012. On November 2, 2012, he was re-acquired by the Bakersfield Jam.

On August 5, 2013, Dennis signed with the Melbourne Tigers for the 2013–14 NBL season. In September 2013, Dennis was ruled out of the 2013–14 season with an Achilles injury and was subsequently released by the Tigers.

On August 14, 2014, Dennis signed with Melbourne United for the 2014–15 NBL season. In 27 games for Melbourne, he averaged 10.0 points, 3.3 rebounds, 3.3 assists and 1.3 steals per game.

On July 31, 2015, Dennis signed with Bnei Herzliya of Israel for the 2015–16 season.

On August 9, 2018, Dennis signed a one-year deal with Elitzur Netanya of the Israeli National League. In 31 games played for Netanya, he averaged 17.9 points, 4.2 rebounds, 3.2 assists and 1.7 steals per game.

On January 20, 2020, Dennis has finalized a contract with Racing Luxembourg in Total League (the highest men's basketball league in Luxembourg).

On March 16, 2020, The Luxembourg Basketball Federation announced the cancellation of the 2019/2020 season of the Total League, due to the epidemic of coronavirus.

Since then, Dennis has since settled into a quieter role as the aquatics manager at the Coatesville YMCA. He spends his time scheduling swim lessons and making sure the pool chemicals are balanced.
