= Reuland =

Reuland may refer to:

- Reuland (surname)
- Reuland, Luxembourg, a village in Luxembourg
- Burg-Reuland, a municipality in Liège, Belgium
- Reuland Castle, a castle in Belgium
