= Jeff Coby =

Haitian-American basketball player

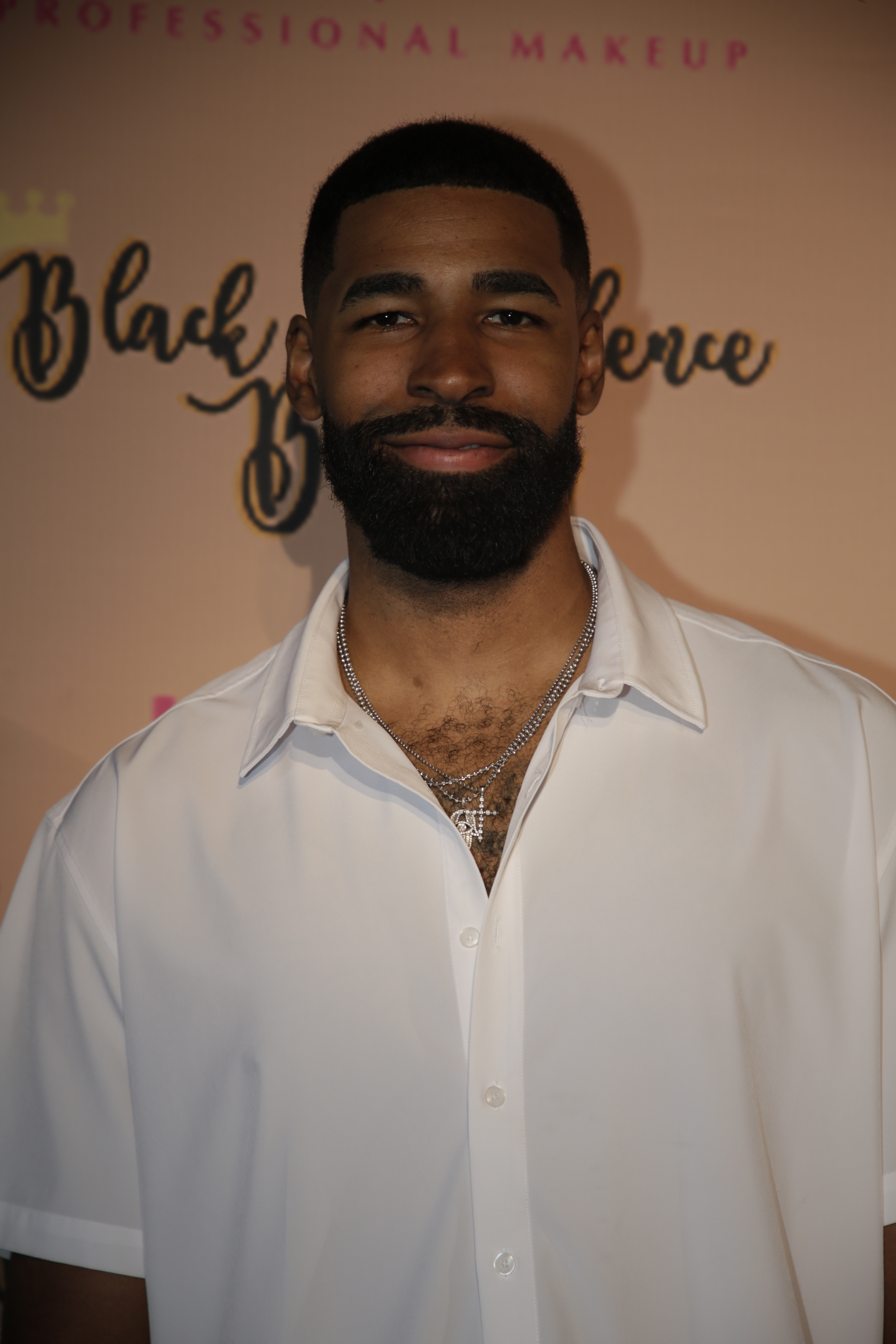
- Coby at Black Excellence Brunch 2026.

Free agent
- Position: Small forward

Personal information
- Born: February 4, 1994 (age 32) Pembroke Pines, Florida, U.S.
- Listed height: 6 ft 8 in (2.03 m)
- Listed weight: 222 lb (101 kg)

Career information
- High school: Sagemont School (Weston, Florida); Choate Rosemary Hall (Wallingford, Connecticut)
- College: Columbia (2013–2017)
- NBA draft: 2017: undrafted
- Playing career: 2017–present

Career history
- 2017–2018: Prat
- 2018: Xuventude
- 2019: Austin Spurs
- 2019: Basket Racing Club Luxembourg
- 2021: Sabios Basketball Club
- 2021: Soles de Santo Domingo Este
- 2021-2022: Raptors Basketball Club
- 2022: CDP Domingo Paulino Santiago
- 2022-2023: Yamaguchi Patriots
- Stats at Basketball Reference

Jeffrey Réginald Coby (born February 4, 1994) is a Haitian-American professional basketball player who last played for Basket Racing Club Luxembourg of the Total League. He played college basketball for Columbia.

== High school career ==
Coby played high school basketball for Sagemont School in Florida, where he was named team most valuable player in 2011 and earned Florida 3A first team honors in 2012. Coby also led Sagemont to its first Florida 2A title. In 2011, he was named among 20 student athletes from his school to visit Russia through a sports exchange program. As a senior, he transferred to Choate Rosemary Hall in Connecticut, where he helped his team finish second at the state championship.

== College career ==
In his freshman season at Columbia, Coby averaged 2.8 points and 2.6 rebounds per game. He recorded 11 points and 6 rebounds on March 1, 2014, against Harvard. As a sophomore, Coby averaged 5.4 points and 3.3 rebounds, starting in 10 of 27 games. He posted career-highs of 16 points and 12 rebounds versus Lehigh on November 23, 2014. In his junior season, Coby averaged 5.7 points and 4.7 rebounds per game. On January 9, 2016, he tallied a career-high 20 points and 13 rebounds in 96–68 win over Central Penn. As a senior, Coby averaged 6.2 points and 4.6 rebounds per game. He posted 13 points and 13 rebounds on January 7, 2017, to guide his team past Howard. At the end of the season, he was named Columbia's defensive player of the year. Coby maintained a 3.0 grade point average and graduated with a degree in art history and sociology.

== Professional career ==
=== Prat (2017–2018) ===
On August 15, 2017, Coby signed a professional contract with CB Prat of the LEB Oro. Through 11 games, he averaged 3.6 points and 3.3 rebounds per game.

=== Xuventude Baloncesto (2018) ===
On January 26, 2018, Coby signed with Xuventude Baloncesto of the LEB Plata. Through 11 games, he averaged 11.6 points and 9.2 rebounds per game.

In October 2018 Coby signed an Exhibit 10 deal with the New York Knicks. He was added to the Westchester Knicks training camp roster.

=== Austin Spurs (2019) ===
On February 12, 2019, Coby signed with the Austin Spurs.

=== Racing Luxembourg (2019) ===
On March 24, 2019, Coby signed with Basket Racing Club Luxembourg.

== National team career ==
Coby is Haitian American, with Haitian-born parents, and plays for the Haiti national basketball team. He has competed for Haiti in 2018 for the FIBA AmeriCup 2021 Caribbean Pre-Qualifiers.
