= List of 2014–15 DBL transactions =

This is a list of 2014–15 Dutch Basketball League (DBL) transactions . Moves made during the 2014 offseason till the end of the season are included. Contract extensions and retiring players are not included.

Only players on the move are included.

Date	Name	Moving from	Moving to	Ref
5 June 2014	(United States) Tai Wesley	(Netherlands) SPM Shoeters Den Bosch	(New Zealand) Southland Sharks	
11 June 2014	(United States) Patrick Richard	(Netherlands) Matrixx Magixx	(Germany) Mitteldeutscher BC	
18 June 2014	(Australia) Joshua Duinker	(Netherlands) Zorg en Zekerheid Leiden	(Australia) Sydney Kings	
28 June 2014	(United States) Roger Franklin	(Netherlands) Matrixx Magixx	(Luxembourg) Black Star Mersch	
30 June 2014	(United States) Philip Bach	(Netherlands) Port of Den Helder Kings	(Netherlands) Aris Leeuwarden	
3 July 2014	(Netherlands) Jeroen van der List	(Netherlands) Port of Den Helder Kings	(Netherlands) Zorg en Zekerheid Leiden	
8 July 2014	(Netherlands) Arvin Slagter	(Netherlands) GasTerra Flames	(Netherlands) SPM Shoeters Den Bosch	
10 June 2014	(United States) Justin Knox	(Netherlands) Port of Den Helder Kings	Westports Malaysia Dragons	
10 June 2014	(Netherlands) Aron Royé	(Netherlands) BC Apollo	(Netherlands) Port of Den Helder Kings	
23 July 2014	(United States) Jason Dourisseau	(Netherlands) GasTerra Flames	(Germany) S.Oliver Baskets	
