= 1968–69 FIBA European Cup Winners' Cup =

- League: FIBA European Cup Winners' Cup
- Sport: Basketball

Finals
- Champions: (Czechoslovakia) Slavia VŠ Praha
- Runners-up: (Soviet Union) Dinamo Tbilisi

FIBA European Cup Winners' Cup seasons
- ← 1967–68 1969–70 →

The 1968–69 FIBA European Cup Winners' Cup was the third edition of FIBA's 2nd-tier level European-wide professional club basketball competition, contested between national domestic cup champions, running from December 1968, to 17 April 1969. 22 teams took part in the competition.

The final, held in Vienna, featured for the first time, two clubs from the Eastern Bloc. Slavia VŠ Praha, which had lost the previous edition's final to AEK, defeated Dinamo Tbilisi, to become the competition's first Czechoslovak League champion.

== Participants ==
Country	Teams	Clubs
Austria	1	Handelsministerium
Belgium	1	Royal IV
Bulgaria	1	Levski-Spartak
Czechoslovakia	1	Slavia VŠ Praha
East Germany	1	TSC Berlin 1893
Finland	1	Helsingin Kisa-Toverit
France	1	Stade Auto Lyon
Greece	1	Panathinaikos
Hungary	1	Soproni MAFC
Israel	1	Hapoel Tel Aviv
Italy	1	Fides Napoli
Luxembourg	1	Nitia
Poland	1	Legia Warsaw
Portugal	1	Benfica
Romania	1	Steaua București
Scotland	1	Boroughmuir
Soviet Union	1	Dinamo Tbilisi
Spain	1	Picadero
Sweden	1	Solna
Turkey	1	Altınordu
West Germany	1	Bayern Munich
(Socialist Federal Republic of Yugoslavia) Yugoslavia	1	AŠK Olimpija

== First round ==
Team 1	Agg.	Team 2	1st leg	2nd leg
Nitia (Luxembourg)	121–186	(West Germany) Bayern Munich	64–84	57–102
Altınordu (Turkey)	123–149	(Socialist Federal Republic of Yugoslavia) AŠK Olimpija	57–70	66–79
Solna (Sweden)	141–177	(Spain) Picadero	70–80	71–97
Boroughmuir (Scotland)	127–212	(Belgium) Royal IV	52–103	75–109
Steaua București (Romania)	186–153	(Israel) Hapoel Tel Aviv	89–58	97–95
Handelministerium (Austria)	139–171	(Greece) Panathinaikos	84–76	55–95
Soproni MAFC (Hungary)	155–171	(Bulgaria) Levski-Spartak	89–92	66–79

== Second round ==
Team 1	Agg.	Team 2	1st leg	2nd leg
Bayern Munich (West Germany)	127–195	(Socialist Federal Republic of Yugoslavia) AŠK Olimpija	81–101	46–94
Picadero (Spain)	151–161	(East Germany) TSC Berlin 1893	82–79	69–82
Helsingin Kisa-Toverit (Finland)	160–170	(Czechoslovakia) Slavia VŠ Praha	74–76	86–94
Legia Warsaw (Poland)	167–155	(Belgium) Royal IV	97–69	70–86
Steaua București (Romania)	160–169	(Italy) Fides Napoli	95–77	65–92
Benfica (Portugal)	144–221	(Greece) Panathinaikos	74–110	70–111
Levski-Spartak (Bulgaria)	148–128	(France) Stade Auto Lyon	85–53	63–75

Automatically qualified to the quarter-finals

- (Soviet Union) Dinamo Tbilisi

== Quarterfinals ==
Team 1	Agg.	Team 2	1st leg	2nd leg
AŠK Olimpija (Socialist Federal Republic of Yugoslavia)	191–164	(East Germany) TSC Berlin 1893	101–73	90–91
Slavia VŠ Praha (Czechoslovakia)	204–162	(Poland) Legia Warsaw	113–82	91–80
Fides Napoli (Italy)	0–2*	(Greece) Panathinaikos	98–61	Not finished
Levski-Spartak (Bulgaria)	137–146	(Soviet Union) Dinamo Tbilisi	83–88	54–58

*Originally, Fides Napoli won the first leg by 37 points (98–61), but in the return game in Athens the Italian club withdrew during halftime (Panathinaikos winning then 51–16) as a protest for what they considered a biased refereeing and many irregularities in the scoring procedure (in particular, Fides claimed that the real halftime score should have been 39–28 for Panathinaikos, and also that the first half lasted more than the regulated 20 minutes). However the French FIBA Commissar Edmond Pigeu nor the Secretary General William Jones (who was also present in the outdoor Panathinian Stadium, with more than 25,000 fans crowding the stands) saw anything irregular in this game. Later, FIBA expelled Fides Napoli from the competition and declared Panathinaikos winner by forfeit (2–0).

== Semifinals ==
Team 1	Agg.	Team 2	1st leg	2nd leg
AŠK Olimpija (Socialist Federal Republic of Yugoslavia)	137–165	(Czechoslovakia) Slavia VŠ Praha	76–83	61–82
Panathinaikos (Greece)	152–170	(Soviet Union) Dinamo Tbilisi	81–67	71–103

== Final ==
April 17, Wiener Stadthalle, Vienna

Team 1	Score	Team 2
Slavia VŠ Praha (Czechoslovakia)	80–74	(Soviet Union) Dinamo Tbilisi

1968–69 FIBA European Cup Winners' Cup Champions

Slavia VŠ Praha
1st title
