= Daeshon Francis =

American basketball player (born 1996)

No. 5 – Bnei Herzliya
- Position: Point guard / shooting guard
- League: Israeli Basketball Premier League

Personal information
- Born: January 26, 1996 (age 30) Indianapolis, Indiana, U.S.
- Listed height: 6 ft 4 in (1.93 m)
- Listed weight: 205 lb (93 kg)

Career information
- High school: Lawrence North (Indianapolis, Indiana)
- College: Green Bay (2014–2015); Midland College (2015–2016); UT Permian Basin (2016–2018)
- NBA draft: 2018: undrafted
- Playing career: 2018–present

Career history
- 2018–2019: BBC Arantia Larochette
- 2019–2020: Rio Grande Valley Vipers
- 2020: Mega Tbilisi
- 2020–2021: BC Nokia
- 2021–2022: Ferro-ZNTU
- 2022–2023: Moncada Agrigento
- 2023–2024: BK Ventspils
- 2024–present: Bnei Herzliya

Career highlights
- Israeli Premier League Defensive Player of the Year (2026)

Daeshon Francis (born January 26, 1996) is an American professional basketball player for Bnei Herzliya of the Israeli Basketball Premier League. He plays the shooting guard position.

== Early life ==
Francis was born in Indianapolis, Indiana, in the United States. He attended Lawrence North in Indianapolis, and played guard for the basketball team. He was named 2014 IBCA/Subway Senior All-State. He is 6 ft 4 in (193 cm), and weighs 210 lb (95 kg).

== College career ==
Francis then attended the University of Wisconsin–Green Bay on scholarship and played basketball for the Green Bay basketball team in 2014–15. He averaged 4.5 points per game, with a .621 field goal percentage.

He subsequently attended Midland College, a junior college, in 2015–16. Playing for the basketball team, he averaged 17.9 points (5th in the league), 6.1 rebounds, 3.3 assists, and 1.9 steals per game. He was named First Team All-WJCAC, and All-NJCAA Region V.

Francis then played basketball for the University of Texas Permian Basin Falcons in 2016–18. In 2016–17, he averaged 18.2 points and 6.6 rebounds per game, with a .559 field goal percentage. He was named 2016-17 Lone Star Conference Player of the Year, Lone Star Conference All-First Team, Lone Star Conference Newcomer of the Year, and NABC All-District South Central First Team.

In 2017-18 Francis averaged 21.9 points and 8.0 rebounds per game, with a .534 field goal percentage. He was named 2017-18 Lone Star Conference Player of the Year, South Central Regional Player of the Year, Lone Star Conference All-First Team, NABC All-District South Central First Team, and a Division II First Team All-American. He is the team's all-time leading scorer (1,303 points), in the top three in school history in assists, rebounds, and steals, and holds the team's single-game record for points (43).

== Professional career ==
=== 2018–20 ===
Francis played for Arantia Larochette in the Luxembourg Basketball League in 2018–19. He averaged 25.9 points (6th in the league), 9.6 rebounds, and 4.8 assists (8th), and 2.0 steals (10th) per game, with a .527 field goal percentage (7th).

He played three games of basketball for the Rio Grande Valley Vipers in the G League in 2019–20.

=== 2020–present ===
Francis played for BC Nokia in the Korisliiga in Finland in 2020–21. He averaged 17.5 points per game, while shooting .822 from the free throw line.

He played basketball for Ferro-ZNTU in the Ukrainian Basketball SuperLeague in 2021–22. Francis averaged 14.0 points, 6.3 rebounds, and 1.8 steals (3rd in the league) per game.

Francis played for Moncada Agrigento in Serie A2 Basket in Italy in 2022–23. He averaged 10.5 points per game.

He played for BK Ventspils in the Estonian-Latvian Basketball League in 2023–24. He averaged 11.1 points per game with an .800 free throw percentage.

He is playing for Bnei Herzliya of the Israeli Basketball Premier League in 2024–present.
