= Roger Franklin =

American former basketball player

Personal information
- Born: September 7, 1990 (age 35) Duncanville, Texas, U.S.
- Listed height: 6 ft 5 in (1.96 m)
- Listed weight: 220 lb (100 kg)

Career information
- High school: Duncanville (Duncanville, Texas)
- College: Oklahoma State (2009–2011); North Texas (2011–2013)
- NBA draft: 2013: undrafted
- Playing career: 2013–2015
- Position: Small forward / shooting guard

Career history
- 2013–2014: Matrixx Magixx
- 2014–2015: Black Star Mersch

Career highlights
- Fourth-team Parade All-American (2009)

Roger Franklin (born September 7, 1990) is an American former basketball player. Born in Duncanville, Texas, he played two years professionally in the Netherlands and Luxembourg.

== Professional career ==
On August 16, 2013, it was announced Franklin would start playing in the Netherlands for Matrixx Magixx.

In June 2014, Franklin signed with Black Star Mersch in Luxembourg.
