= Mullendorf =

Town in Steinsel, Luxembourg

Coordinates: 49°41′N 6°08′E

Mullendorf (Luxembourgish: Mëllerëf; German: Müllendorf [ˈmʏləndɔʁf]) is a town in the commune of Steinsel, in central Luxembourg. As of September 2026, the town has a population of 1,383.
