= Reuland (surname) =

Reuland is a surname. Notable people with the surname include:

- Gina Reuland (born 1992), Luxembourgian pole vaulter
- Konrad Reuland (1987–2016), American football player
- Robert Reuland (born 1963), American novelist and attorney
