= Reuland, Luxembourg =

Village in Luxembourg

Coordinates: 49°45′N 6°16′E

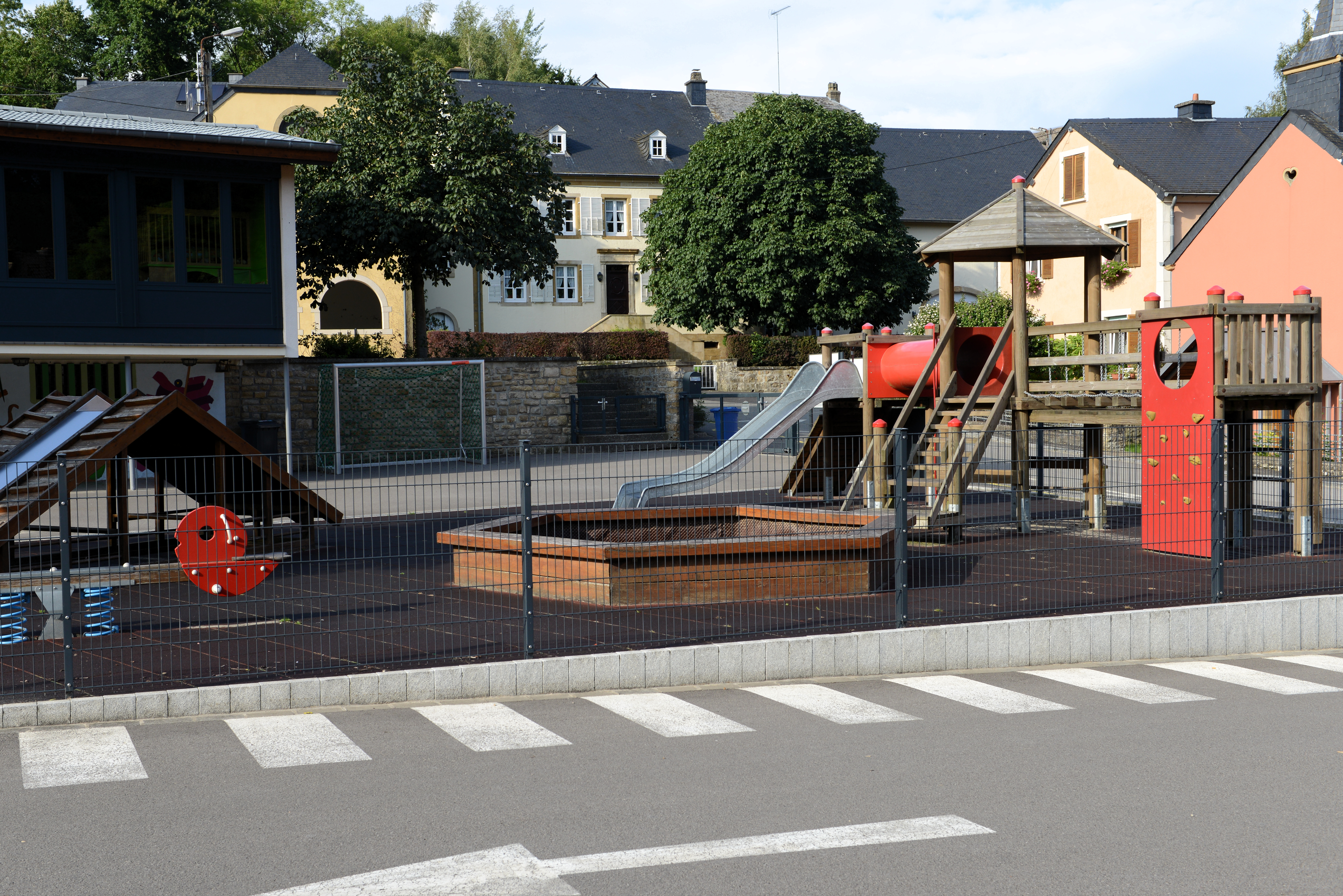
The playground of the school near the church of Reiland

Reuland (German pronunciation: [ˈʁɔʏlant]; Luxembourgish: Reiland) is a village in the commune of Heffingen, in central Luxembourg. As of September 2026, the village has a population of 392.
