= B.B.C. Union Sportive Hiefenech =

Sports club

Basket Ball Club Union Sportive Hiefenech was founded in 1959 in the small town of Heffingen, Luxembourg.

== History ==
The golden era of the club came in the late 1980s and lasted until the early 2000s. The team won four national leagues and four cups.

=== European competition ===
Competition	Team	Opponent(s)	Round(s)	Home	Away	Aggregate
Champions Cup 1991	(Luxembourg) Telekurs Hiefenech	(East Germany) BSG AdW Berlin (Spain) FC Barcelona	First round Round of 16	98 – 84; 73 – 113	92 – 96; 77 – 117	190–180; 150–230
Korać Cup 1994	(Luxembourg) Telekurs Hiefenech	(Wales) Cardiff Bay Heat (Germany) EnBW Ludwigsburg	First round Second round	78 – 72; 80 – 86	89 – 79; 69 – 105	167–151; 149–191

== Honours ==
Luxembourgian League

- Winners (4): 1988–89, 1989–90, 1990–91, 1995-96

Luxembourgish Cup

- Winners (4): 1993–94, 1994–95, 1997–98, 1999-00
