= BBC Résidence =

Basket-Ball Club Résidence or simply Résidence or Résidence Walferdange is a professional basketball club from the commune of Walferdange.

== History ==
Résidence was founded in 1965. Later the same year began the inauguration of the Prince Henry Stadium, the club's homecourt. On March 2, 1967 was allowed to BBC Résidence, the admission of the association with the FLBB. In 1971–72 season the men's team won its first title in the third division and in 1977-78 season finished fourth in the national division. In 1980 the club celebrated its 15th anniversary. The organizing committee of the event created the supporter club "Go Basket" under the chairmanship of Maisy Meintz and under the Vice Presidency of Mulles Feidt. In 1982-83 season came the first success of male seniors: they won the Memorial Cup in National Division (85-83 against Etzella Ettelbruck). The real success story for Résidence was in the mid-1990s when the club became a top team for the Diekirch League and won four titles and three consecutive from 1993 to 1995. Résidence, as champion of Luxembourg, took part in the FIBA European league in the 1993–94 season where they were eliminated in first round by the Czech Slavia Prague while the next year had the same effect against another historical Czech club of Bioveta COOP Banca Brno.

== Honours ==
Luxembourgian League

- Winners (4): 1992-93, 1993–94, 1994–95, 1996-97

Luxembourgish Cup

- Winners (1): 1992-93, 2021-2022

Luxembourgish League 2

- Winners (1): 2006-07

== Notable players ==
- (United States) Everage Richardson
