= Stade Auto Lyon =

- Founded: 1948
- History: 1948–Present
- Arena: Automobile Berliet
- Location: Lyon, France
- Team colors: Red & yellow
- Championships: 1 French Cup; 1 French League 2
Home	Away

Stade Auto Lyon, commonly abbreviated as SA Lyon or SAL, is a French basketball club that is based in Lyon, now disappeared from the high and mid level of French professional leagues.

== History ==
The year 1916 marks the creation by the founder of Berliet automobiles, Marius Berliet, of Union Sportive Berliet for enterprise workers can practice sports. Several sections was open: basketball, rugby, football, etc.

During the Second World War the club goes out and, in 1944, founded the Stade Berliet . The following year a new name finally adopted and it was Stade Auto Lyon . The SAL was the first sports club in the Lyon region from 1949 to 1970. The basketball section for nine seasons, belonged to the elite championship of France for a record of 82 wins, 4 draws and 72 defeats in 158 matches.

The club won the French Cup in 1960–61 against the PUC and finished second in the championship in 1959–60, 1960–61 and 1967–68 seasons.

The 1968–69 season, SAL took part for first and only time in the European Cup Winners Cup where they were eliminated in the second round by the Bulgarian Levski-Spartak (crashing defeat in Sofia with 53–85 and victory in Lyon with a score of 75–63).

== Honours ==
Total titles: (2)

French Cup

- Winners (1): 1960–61

French League 2

- Winners (1): 1956–57

== Notable players ==
- (France) Jacques Cachemire
- (France) Bernard Fatien
- (France) Pierre Galle
- (France) Bernard Lamarque
- (France) Gérard Lespinasse
- (France) Robert Monclar
- (France) Christian Petit
- (France) Albert Demeyer
- (France) Michel Housse

== Head coaches ==
- (France) André Buffière
