= BBC Arantia Larochette =

Basketball club from Luxembourg

Basket-Ball Club Arantia Larochette is professional basketball club from Luxembourg that competes in the Total League.

== History ==
Aranatia Larochette was founded in 1964 and the name of the club comes from the Arantia Kelteschen stands for the White Iernz by the rock communities. Arantia won its first and only one national Cup in 1970. As cup winner, the club participated for the first time in its history at the 1970–71 FIBA European Cup Winners' Cup and eliminated by the Belgian Bell Mechelen with two defeats (85-106 in homecourt and 48-108 in Winketkaai of Mechelen). The next year, Arantia faced Spartak ZJŠ Brno in the first round of 1971–72 FIBA European Cup Winners' Cup, and eliminated again with two easy defeats from the Czechs.

== Honours & achievements ==
Luxembourgian Cup

- Winners (1): 1969–70

== Notable players ==
- (United States) Daeshon Francis
