= BBC Nitia =

Professional basketball club of Luxembourg

Beetebuerger Basket Club Nitia or simply Nitia Bettembourg is a Luxembourgish professional basketball club from the commune of Bettembourg.

== History ==
Nitia Bettembourg was founded in 1932 by pioneers of Luxembourgish basketball, and is the first basketball club of the Grand Duchy of Luxembourg and celebrated its 75th anniversary in 2007. BBC Nitia is affiliated with the FLBB (Luxembourg Basketball Federation).

== Name through history ==
- 1932-1933 KJ Beetebuerg (Katholischer Jünglingsverein Bettemburg)
- 1934-1941 CSC Nitia Beetebuerg (Cercle Sportif Catholique Nitia)
- 1942-1945 Sportverein für Basketball und Fussball Bettemburg
- 1945-1955 C.S. Sporting Nitia Beetebuerg (football section, basketball section, etc.) ... and ... Basket-Ball-Club de Bettembourg (BBC))
- 1955-1967 Sporting Nitia Beetebuerg ... and ... Basket-Ball-Club de Bettembourg (BBC)
- 1967-1968 C.S. Nitia Beetebuerg (Cercle Sportif Nitia) ... and ... Basket-Ball-Club de Bettembourg (BBC)
- 1968 to present BBC Nitia (Beetebuerger Basket Club Nitia)

== Honours ==
Total League

- Winners (16): 1933-34, 1934–35, 1935–36, 1936–37, 1937–38, 1938–39, 1939–40, 1944–45, 1945–46, 1946–47, 1947–48, 1948–49, 1949–50, 1950–51, 1952–53, 1953-54

Luxembourgish Cup

- Winners (3): 1953-54, 1957–58, 1967–68
