= B.B.C. Amicale Steesel =

Professional basketball club in Steinsel, Luxembourg

Amicale Steesel
- Leagues: Total League
- Founded: 1947; 79 years ago
- History: B.B.C. Amicale Steesel (1947–present)
- Arena: Halle Ominsports Alain Marchetti
- Capacity: 1,000
- Location: Steinsel, Luxembourg
- President: Frank Fischer
- Head coach: Daniel Alves Brandao
- Championships: 10 Luxembourgian Leagues; 7 Luxembourgian Cups
- Website: www.amicale.lu
Home	Away

B.B.C. Amicale Steesel is a Luxembourgish professional basketball club based in Steinsel. The club is one of the most successful in Luxembourg, as Amicale has won 10 national championships.

== History ==
Founded in 1947, BBC Amicale was the first Luxembourg club with its own clubhouse and private sports hall, where the club was based in 1958. These good structural conditions were not initially reflected in sporting performance and it was only in the early-1970s the club established itself as the top team in the highest Luxembourg Basketball League, winning the championship in 1970-71 and 1972-73. Consequently, BBC Amicale fought mainly against the T71 Dudelange for national supremacy and subject to the first mid-70s. However, Amicale closed the 1977–78 season again as a master from, as well as in 1980 and 1981. With 10 domestic league titles, Amicale is the fourth most successful basketball team in Luxembourg. In addition, the club won the Luxembourg Cup seven times between 1971 and 2025.

Although they could only celebrate championships in the youth section in the recent past, after thirteen years they reached the finals in 2013 for the Championship for Men in which they ran against defending champion T71 Dudelange.

Better-known players who played in the German Basketball League, were the Estonian national player Margus Metstak and the Czech international player Kamil Novák. In the league finals in 2013 including the Americans Reggie Golson and the Luxembourg national player Samy Picard were members of the squad.

In 2016, 2017 and 2018, the team, led by national player Samy Picard, managed to win three consecutive championships. The team also included Bob Melcher and future professional player, Alex Laurent. In 2 of these 3 years, they also won the cup competition. Led by Luxembourg national team players Tom Konen and Bob Melcher, they won also the 2022 championship in the final against T71 Dudelange. In 2023, they were defeated in the final by Basket Esch before securing another title in 2024.1

== Youth Basketball ==
Steinsel has enjoyed considerable success in youth basketball, with many strong age groups over the years. However, none were as dominant as the 1996–1997 cohort. The 1996–1997 cohort included 14 licensed players with youth national team experience, 10 of whom had competed in European Championships.23 This team is widely regarded as the strongest youth team in the history of Luxembourgish basketball.

In 2009, this exceptional group achieved a historic feat by winning both the U14 league championship and the U14 league cup without suffering a single defeat. They completed the season with a perfect 24:0 record.4

Three years later, in 2012, the same team replicated this remarkable performance in the U16 league, again finishing the season unbeaten with a 24:0 record and securing both the league title and the cup.5

During the 2012 season, this age group participated in the prestigious international basketball tournament in Kortrijk in the U16 category. This tournament brings together the best youth teams from across Europe to compete against each other. Among the participants were BJBS Riga, Elite Sport Academy Denmark, Apollo Amsterdam, USK Prague, BMS Copenhagen, ALBA Berlin, Antwerp Giants, and many others.6

Their dominance culminated in 2014, when they once more completed a perfect 24:0 season in the U18 league, winning both the championship and the cup. To this day, this is the only youth team in Luxembourg's basketball history to achieve three undefeated championship-and-cup seasons.7

The 2014 U18 team regularly overwhelmed opponents from the first division, often winning by margins of 60 points or more, and occasionally by as much as 90 points.8910 On May 25th, in the U18 cup final against Dudelange, they set a national record: a 101:46 victory, the largest margin of victory in a cup final in Luxembourg's history.11

For the 2014 season, Steinsel had only five licensed players in the Espoirs/U22 category. Nevertheless, the club made the decision to register a team for the 2013–2014 season and increasingly relied on players from the U18 category. At that time, the U22 league was dominated by the best players born in 1992-1993. Steinsel mostly relied on the 1996-1997 cohort, which means their players were in some cases up to five years younger. Up to 7 players from the U18 Team were involved in some games.

The season concluded with an impressive record of 21 wins and only 2 losses. On June 1, 2014, Steinsel faced the star-studded team from Ettelbruck in the championship final. Led by national standout P. Gutenkauf, Ettelbruck's team featured 6 players who had competed for Luxembourg at U20 European Championships. Steinsel, on the other hand, had only 2 players who had represented Luxembourg at U20 European Championships. Their finals roster had to be supplemented with players from the U18 team, making up half the squad. Despite a clear age disadvantage, Steinsel emerged victorious with a 72:68 win. With an average team age of just 18.9 years, they became the youngest team in Luxembourg's history to win the U22 championship.12

== Honours ==
Luxembourgian League

- Winners (10): 1970-71, 1972–73, 1977–78, 1979–80, 1980–81, 2015–16, 2016–17, 2017–18, 2021–22, 2023–24

Luxembourgish Cup

- Winners (7): 1970-71, 1977–78, 1978–79, 1979–80, 2014–15, 2016–17, 2017–18

U18 League

- Winners (10): 1969-70, 1987-88, 2005-06, 2006-07, 2008-09, 2009-10, 2010-11, 2013-14, 2018-19, 2021–22

Coupe des Jeunes

- Winners (9): 2005-06, 2006-07, 2008-09, 2009-10, 2013-14, 2018-2019, 2022-23, 2023-24, 2024–25

== Notable players ==
Note: Flags indicate national team eligibility at FIBA-sanctioned events. Players may hold other non-FIBA nationalities not displayed.

Criteria

To appear in this section a player must have either:

- Set a club record or won an individual award while at the club
- Played at least one official international match for their national team at any time
- Played at least one official NBA match at any time.

- (Luxembourg) Alex Laurent
- (Luxembourg) Samy Picard
- (Luxembourg) Bob Melcher
- (Luxembourg) Tom Konen
- (Luxembourg) Lou Demuth
- (Luxembourg) Eric Jeitz
- (Luxembourg) Pit Koster
- (Luxembourg) Ivor kuresevic
- (Estonia) Margus Metstak

== Head coaches ==
- (Romania) Dragoş Nosievici
