= Musel Pikes =

Professional basketball club in Stadtbredimus, Luxembourg

- Leagues: Total League
- Founded: 2000; 25 years ago
- Location: Stadtbredimus, Luxembourg
- Head coach: John Dieckelman
- Website: www.pikes.lu/home

Musel Pikes is a Luxembourgish basketball club based in Stadtbredimus. The club was founded in 2000 after the merger between BC Stadtbredimus and Rief Remich.

== Honours ==
- Total League

Runners-up (4): 2007–08, 2008–09, 2015–16, 2016–17

- Luxembourg Cup

Winners (1): 2004
Runners-up (4): 2003, 2004, 2005, 2006
