= T71 Dudelange =

Professional basketball club in Dudelange, Luxembourg

- Leagues: Total League
- Founded: 1954; 71 years ago
- History: T71 Dudelange; 1954–present
- Arena: Centre Sportif René Hartmann
- Location: Dudelange, Luxembourg
- President: Alain Becker
- 2023–24 position: Total League, 6th of 12
- Championships: 13 Luxembourg League; 12 Luxembourg Cups
- Website: t71.lu
Home	Away

T71 Dudelange is a professional basketball club based in Dudelange, Luxembourg. Established in 1954, the club plays in the Total League, the highest tier of Luxembourgian basketball. The club has won the national championships thirteen times, third most after Etzella and Nitia.

== History ==
The roots of T71 go back to 1954 at which time, at the initiative of the local CA Dudelange (track & field), some basketball fans founded a basketball section. In 1959 the basketball section separates from the CAD and joins the HB Dudelange (handball) club. In 1968, the basketball section becomes an independent entity within the HBD organization.

Since 1971, T71 has had a lot of success and celebrated 13 championships and 12 cup wins with its men team. The ladies won the championship 4 times and the cup competition three times. Both teams play in the highest division in the Total League.

== Success ==
=== Men ===
- Total League
  - Winners (13): 1975, 1976, 1977, 1982, 1983, 1984, 1985, 2010, 2011, 2013, 2014, 2015, 2021
- Luxembourg Cup
  - Winners (12): 1974, 1975, 1977, 1983, 1984, 1988, 1989, 2009, 2012, 2013, 2014, 2016

=== Women ===
- 4x champion: 2003, 2009, 2021, 2022
- 3x cup winner: 2011, 2014, 2024
