= Heffingen =

Heffingen Hiefenech
- Commune
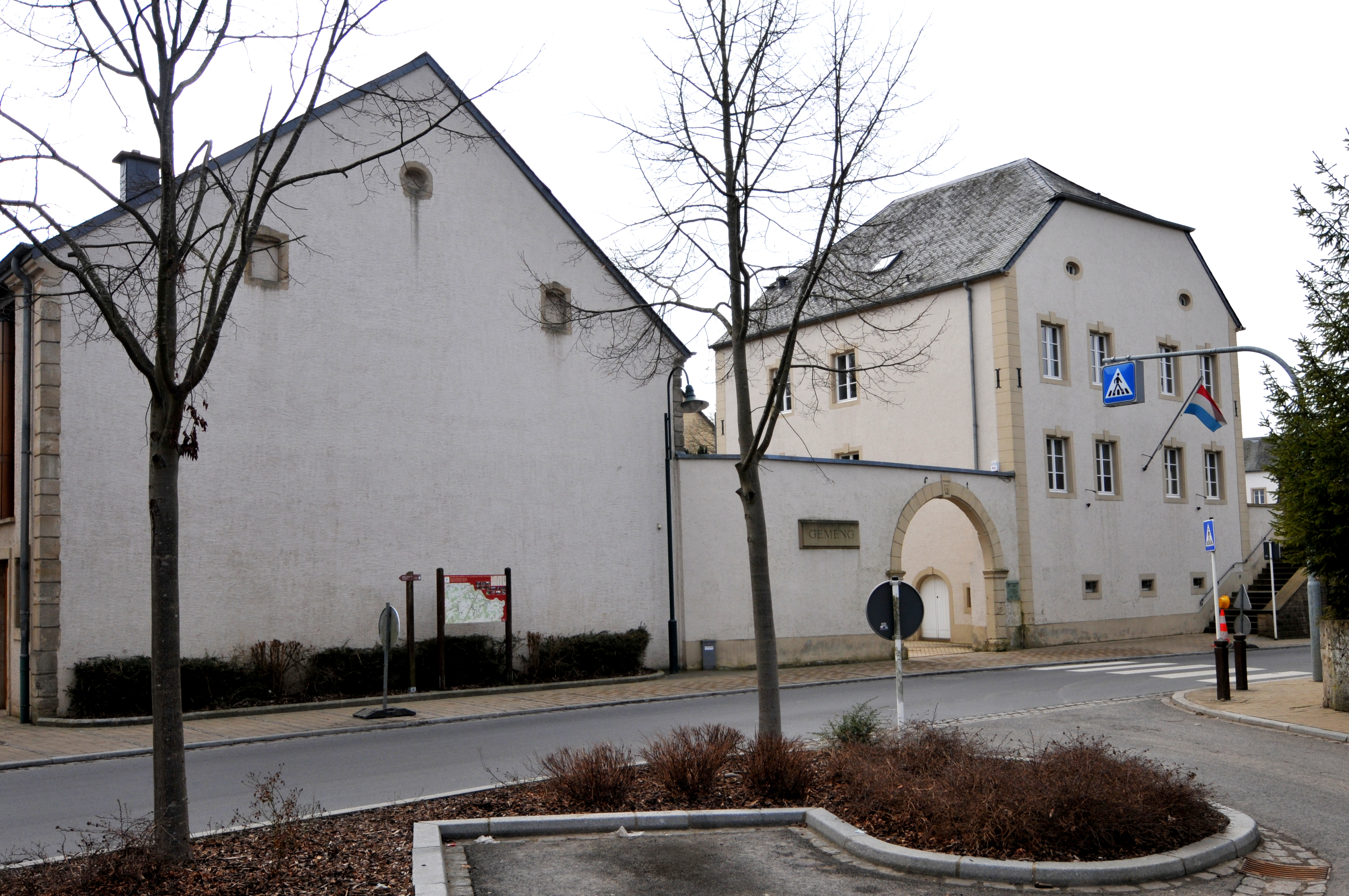
- Town hall

- Coat of arms

- Map of Luxembourg with Heffingen highlighted in orange, and the canton in dark red
- Coordinates: 49.7667°N 6.2333°E
- Country: Luxembourg
- Canton: Mersch

Government
  - Mayor: Jérôme Seiler

Area
  - Total: 13.34 km^{2} (5.15 sq mi)
  - Rank: 85th of 100
- Highest elevation: 405 m (1,329 ft)
  - Rank: 46th of 100
- Lowest elevation: 277 m (909 ft)
  - Rank: 79th of 100

Population (2025)
  - Total: 1,560
  - Rank: 90th of 100
  - Density: 117/km^{2} (303/sq mi)
  - Rank: 62nd of 100
- Time zone: UTC+1 (CET)
  - Summer (DST): UTC+2 (CEST)
- LAU 2: LU0000405
- Website: heffingen.lu

Heffingen (German pronunciation: [ˈhɛfɪŋən]; Luxembourgish: Hiefenech) is a commune and small town in central Luxembourg, in the canton of Mersch.

As of September 2026, the town of Heffingen, which lies in the centre of the commune, has a population of 1,231. Another town within the commune is Reuland.

Historical population

Year	Pop.	±%
1821	574	—
1851	1,114	+94.1%
1900	841	−24.5%
1910	758	−9.9%
1922	725	−4.4%
1935	722	−0.4%

Year	Pop.	±%
1947	724	+0.3%
1960	616	−14.9%
1970	603	−2.1%
1981	654	+8.5%
1990	732	+11.9%
2000	840	+14.8%

Year	Pop.	±%
2005	882	+5.0%
2010	1,045	+18.5%
2015	1,201	+14.9%
2020	1,504	+25.2%
2021	1,520	+1.1%

Source data
