= Steinsel =

Steinsel Steesel
- Commune
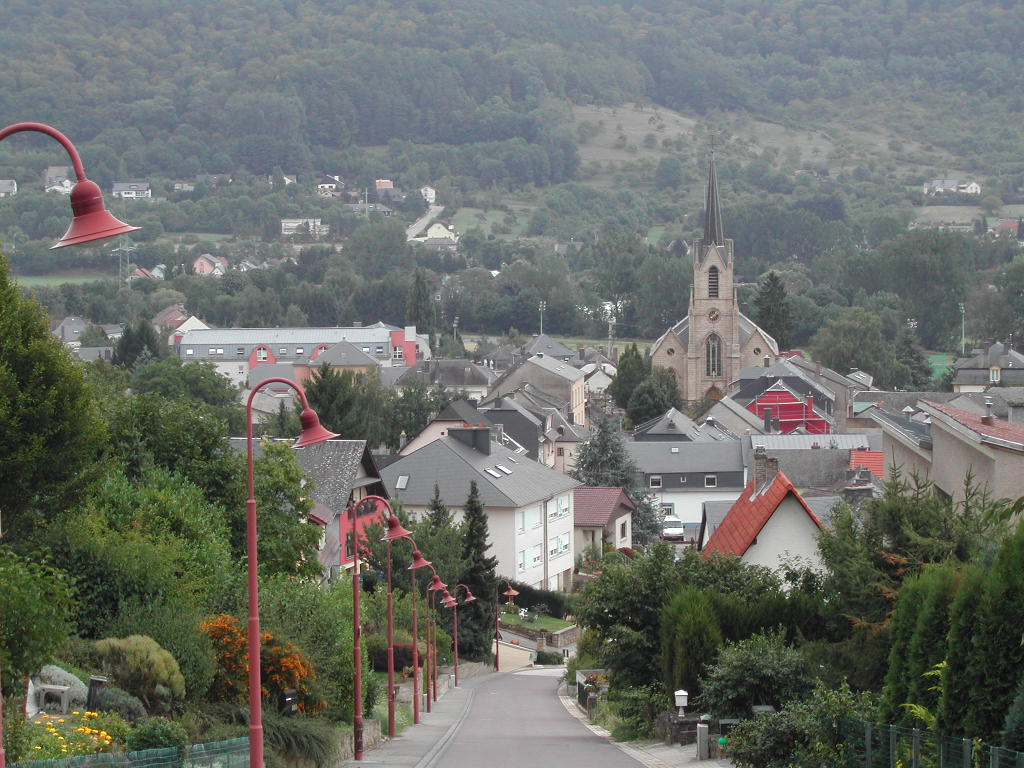

- Coat of arms

- Map of Luxembourg with Steinsel highlighted in orange, and the canton in dark red
- Coordinates: 49.6764°N 6.1236°E
- Country: Luxembourg
- Canton: Luxembourg

Government
  - Mayor: Manon Kolber-Hoffmann

Area
  - Total: 21.81 km^{2} (8.42 sq mi)
  - Rank: 47th of 100
- Highest elevation: 373 m (1,224 ft)
  - Rank: 71st of 100
- Lowest elevation: 241 m (791 ft)
  - Rank: 47th of 100

Population (2026)
  - Total: 6,352
  - Rank: 29th of 100
  - Density: 291.2/km^{2} (754.3/sq mi)
  - Rank: 29th of 100
- Time zone: UTC+1 (CET)
  - Summer (DST): UTC+2 (CEST)
- LAU 2: LU0000308
- Website: steinsel.lu

Steinsel (German pronunciation: [ˈʃtaɪnzl̩]; Luxembourgish: Steesel [ˈʃteːzəl]) is a commune and town in central Luxembourg. It is located north of Luxembourg City.

As of September 2026, the town of Steinsel, which lies in the west of the commune, has a population of 2,733. Other towns within the commune include Heisdorf and Mullendorf.

Like most of Luxembourg, Steinsel has an oceanic climate. On 25 July 2019, Steinsel recorded a temperature of 40.8 °C (105.4 °F), which is the highest temperature recorded in Luxembourg since records began in 1838.

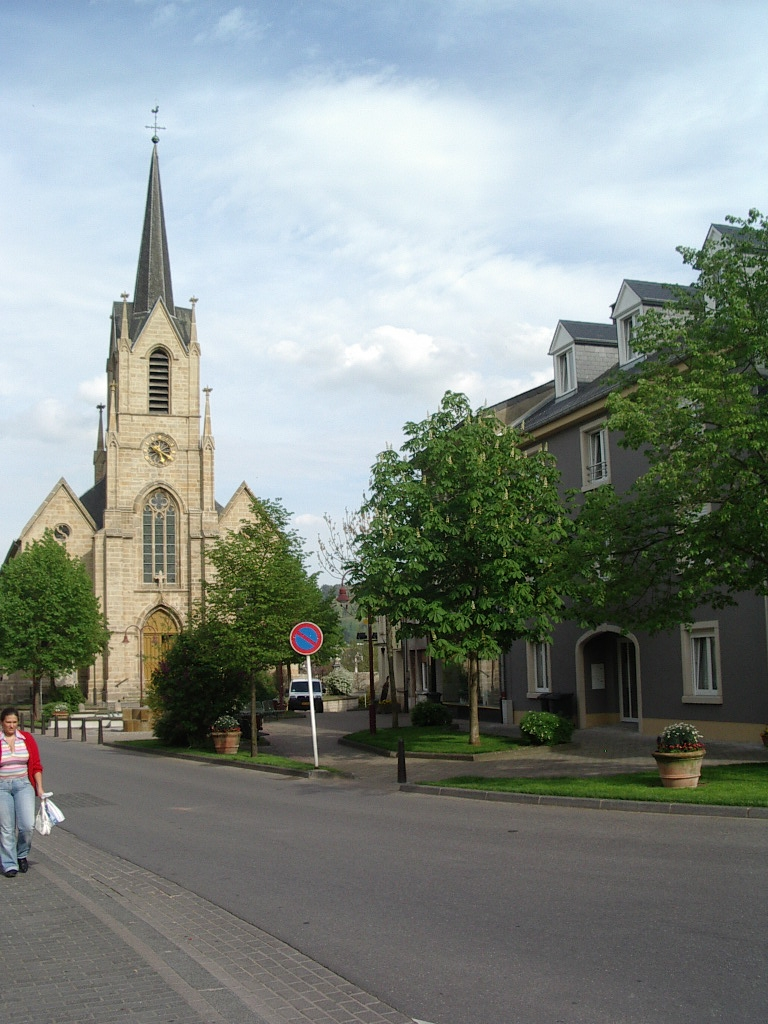
The church of Steinsel

== Geography ==
The commune of Steinsel is situated north of Walferdange, in the Alzette valley, and is the northernmost commune in the Canton of Luxembourg. It is split in two by the Alzette, with the towns of Steinsel and Mullendorf lying to its west, and Heisdorf lying to its east.

== Notable people ==
- Pierre Dupong (1885–1953), a Luxembourgish politician and statesman; the 16th Prime Minister of Luxembourg, serving from 1937 to 1953,

== Population ==
Historical population

| Year | Pop. | ±% |
|---|---|---|
| 1821 | 1,146 | — |
| 1851 | 1,494 | +30.4% |
| 1900 | 1,203 | −19.5% |
| 1910 | 1,193 | −0.8% |
| 1922 | 1,308 | +9.6% |
| 1935 | 1,429 | +9.3% |

| Year | Pop. | ±% |
|---|---|---|
| 1947 | 1,427 | −0.1% |
| 1960 | 1,669 | +17.0% |
| 1970 | 1,911 | +14.5% |
| 1981 | 2,421 | +26.7% |
| 1990 | 3,172 | +31.0% |
| 2000 | 4,374 | +37.9% |

| Year | Pop. | ±% |
|---|---|---|
| 2005 | 4,516 | +3.2% |
| 2010 | 4,665 | +3.3% |
| 2015 | 5,016 | +7.5% |
| 2020 | 5,443 | +8.5% |
| 2021 | 5,500 | +1.0% |

Source data
