= Luxembourg Basketball League =

Premier men's basketball league in Luxembourg

- Sport: Basketball
- Founded: 1933
- No. of teams: 12
- Country: Luxembourg
- Continent: Europe
- Most recent champion: Etzella (17th title) (2025–26)
- Most titles: Etzella (17 titles)
- Sponsor: Total
- Level on pyramid: 1
- Relegation to: Nationale 2
- Domestic cup: Luxembourg Cup
- Website: luxembourg.basketball

The Nationale 1 Hommes, officially named the Luxembourg Basketball League (LBBL), is the highest men's basketball league in Luxembourg. The league's governing body is Fédération Luxembourgeoise de Basketball (FLBB). The league was previously known by sponsorships names Diekirch League and Total League.

== About ==
As the Luxembourg Basketball League is semi-professional, all clubs are run as not-for-profit. Each team in the league is allowed to have two American players on the roster. While most local players do not receive a salary, American players are paid.

There are two player statuses: JICL (French acronym for "player registered with a Luxembourgish club") and non-JICL. To be classified as JICL, a player has to have obtained a license from a FLBB club before their 16th birthday, or have one for at least three seasons between their 16th and 21st birthday. Prior to the 2013–14 season, each team was only allowed two non-JICL players, no exceptions. In July 2013, the European Commission adjudged the ruling was contrary to the Schengen Agreement. Following that decision, the rule was scrapped and replaced by a gentlemen's agreement to keep the number at two, though some have signed a third non-JICL player, arguing they were part-time players.

== Format ==
During the regular season, each team plays the other nine teams twice, one at home and one away (10 teams, 18 games, 18 rounds). After this, the top six teams move on to the second stage, where they play a further 10 games against each other. The top four teams at the conclusion of the second stage move on to the playoffs. In the semi-finals, the No. 1 seed plays the No. 4 seed, and the No. 2 seed plays the No. 3 seed. The winner of each best-of-three semi-final moves on to the Finals series to decide the title (also best-of-three).

Meanwhile, the bottom four teams after the regular season join the best four teams from the second-tier Nationale 2 to play for relegation and promotion respectively. The two worst ranked Nationale 1 teams are relegated whilst the two best Nationale 2 teams are promoted.

== Current clubs ==
Current clubs
Club (Note: Official names in French as per linguistic rules.)	City	Arena	Founded	Last title
AB Contern	Contern	Hall sportif "Um Ewent"	1956	2009
Amicale Steesel	Steinsel	Hall omnisports "Alain Marchetti"	1947	2024
Arantia Larochette	Larochette	Hall sportif Centre Filano	1964	Never
Avanti Mondorf	Mondorf	Centre sportif "Roll Delles"	2000	Never
Basket Esch	Esch-sur-Alzette	Hall omnisport Esch-sur-Alzette	1959	2023
Etzella Ettelbruck	Ettelbruck	Centre sportif du Deich	1934	2006
Mambra Mamer	Mamer	Hall Sportif Nicolas Frantz	2000	Never
Musel Pikes	Stadtbredimus	Sporthal Stadbriedemes	2000	Never
Résidence Walferdange	Walferdange	Centre Prince Henri	1965	1997
Sparta Bertrange	Bertrange	Centre Atert	1935	2012
T71 Dudelange	Dudelange	Salle Fos Grimler	1971	2021
Union Sportive Hiefenech	Heffingen	Centre sportif Heffingen	1959	1996

Former clubs
Club	City	Arena	Founded	Last season	Last title
Black Star Mersch	Mersch	Hall omnisports Mersch	1934	2015	1968
Nitia Bettembourg	Bettembourg	Centre sportif Bettembourg	1932	2012	1953
AS Soleuvre	Soleuvre	Centre sportif "Roger Krier"	1937	2017	2002
B.C. Mess	Mondercange	Complexe sportif Mondercange	1967	2007	Never

== Title holders ==
- 1933–34: Nitia
- 1934–35: Nitia
- 1935–36: Nitia
- 1936–37: Nitia
- 1937–38: Nitia
- 1938–39: Nitia
- 1939–40: Nitia
- 1940–44: Not held
- 1944–45: Nitia
- 1945–46: Nitia
- 1946–47: Nitia
- 1947–48: Nitia
- 1948–49: Nitia
- 1949–50: Nitia
- 1950–51: Nitia
- 1951–52: Black Boys Kayl
- 1952–53: Nitia
- 1953–54: Nitia
- 1954–55: Etzella
- 1955–56: Etzella
- 1956–57: Etzella
- 1957–58: Sparta Bertrange
- 1958–59: Rou'de Le'w Kayl
- 1959–60: Sparta Bertrange
- 1960–61: Etzella
- 1961–62: Etzella
- 1962–63: Etzella
- 1963–64: Etzella
- 1964–65: Etzella
- 1965–66: Black Star Mersch
- 1966–67: Racing Luxembourg
- 1967–68: Black Star Mersch
- 1968–69: Sparta Bertrange
- 1969–70: Etzella
- 1970–71: Amicale Steesel
- 1971–72: Etzella
- 1972–73: Amicale Steesel
- 1973–74: Sparta Bertrange
- 1974–75: T71 Dudelange
- 1975–76: T71 Dudelange
- 1976–77: T71 Dudelange
- 1977–78: Amicale Steesel
- 1978–79: Sparta Bertrange
- 1979–80: Amicale Steesel
- 1980–81: Amicale Steesel
- 1981–82: T71 Dudelange
- 1982–83: T71 Dudelange
- 1983–84: T71 Dudelange
- 1984–85: T71 Dudelange
- 1985–86: Sparta Bertrange
- 1986–87: Sparta Bertrange
- 1987–88: Contern
- 1988–89: Union Sportive Hiefenech
- 1989–90: Union Sportive Hiefenech
- 1990–91: Union Sportive Hiefenech
- 1991–92: Etzella
- 1992–93: Résidence
- 1993–94: Résidence
- 1994–95: Résidence
- 1995–96: Union Sportive Hiefenech
- 1996–97: Résidence
- 1997–98: Racing Luxembourg
- 1998–99: Etzella
- 1999–00: Racing Luxembourg
- 2000–01: Contern
- 2001–02: AS Soleuvre|Soleuvre
- 2002–03: Etzella
- 2003–04: Contern
- 2004–05: Sparta Bertrange
- 2005–06: Etzella
- 2006–07: Sparta Bertrange
- 2007–08: Sparta Bertrange
- 2008–09: Contern
- 2009–10: T71 Dudelange
- 2010–11: T71 Dudelange
- 2011–12: Sparta Bertrange
- 2012–13: T71 Dudelange
- 2013–14: T71 Dudelange
- 2014–15: T71 Dudelange
- 2015–16: Amicale Steesel
- 2016–17: Amicale Steesel
- 2017–18: Amicale Steesel
- 2018–19: Etzella
- 2019–20: None
- 2020–21: T71 Dudelange
- 2021–22: Amicale Steesel
- 2022–23: Esch
- 2023–24: Amicale Steesel
- 2024–25: Etzella
- 2025–26: Etzella

=== Finals 2003-2026 ===
Season	Winner	Runner-up	Score
2003–04	Contern	Sparta Bertrange	2–0
2004–05	Sparta Bertrange	Etzella	2–1
2005–06	Etzella	Sparta Bertrange	2–0
2006–07	Sparta Bertrange	T71 Dudelange	2–0
2007–08	Sparta Bertrange	Musel Pikes	2–0
2008–09	Contern	Musel Pikes	2–1
2009–10	T71 Dudelange	Sparta Bertrange	2–1
2010–11	T71 Dudelange	Etzella	2–1
2011–12	Sparta Bertrange	T71 Dudelange	2–0
2012–13	T71 Dudelange	Amicale	2–0
2013–14	T71 Dudelange	Amicale	2–1
2014–15	T71 Dudelange	Amicale	2–1
2015–16	Amicale	Musel Pikes	2–0
2016–17	Amicale	Musel Pikes	2–1
2017–18	Amicale	Etzella	3–0
2018–19	Etzella	T71 Dudelange	3–1
2019–20	None held due to COVID-19 pandemic		
2020–21	T71 Dudelange	Esch	2–0
2021–22	Amicale Steesel	T71 Dudelange	3–2
2022–23	Esch	Amicale	3–1
2023–24	Amicale	Etzella	3–1
2024–25	Etzella	T71 Dudelange	3–0
2025–26	Etzella	Sparta Bertrange	3–0

== Performance by club ==
Club	Titles	Years
Etzella	17	1954–55, 1955–56, 1956–57, 1960–61, 1961–62, 1962–63, 1963–64, 1964–65, 1969–70, 1971–72, 1991–92, 1998–99, 2002–03, 2005–06, 2018–19, 2024–25, 2025–26
Nitia	16	1933–34, 1934–35, 1935–36, 1936–37, 1937–38, 1938–39, 1939–40, 1944–45, 1945–46, 1946–47, 1947–48, 1948–49, 1949–50, 1950–51, 1952–53, 1953–54
T71 Dudelange	13	1974–75, 1975–76, 1976–77, 1981–82, 1982–83, 1983–84, 1984–85, 2009–10, 2010–11, 2012–13, 2013–14, 2014–15, 2020–21
Sparta Bertrange	11	1957–58, 1959–60, 1968–69, 1973–74, 1978–79, 1985–86, 1986–87, 2004–05, 2006–07, 2007–08, 2011–12
Amicale	10	1970–71, 1972–73, 1977–78, 1979–80, 1980–81, 2015–16, 2016–17, 2017–18, 2021–22, 2023–24
Contern	4	1987–88, 2000–01, 2003–04, 2008–09
Hiefenech	4	1988–89, 1989–90, 1990–91, 1995–96
Résidence	4	1992–93, 1993–94, 1994–95, 1996–97
Racing Luxembourg	3	1966–67, 1997–98, 1999–00
Black Star Mersch	2	1965–66, 1967–68
Black Boys Kayl	1	1951–52
Rou'de Le'w Kayl	1	1958–59
Soleuvre	1	2001–02
Esch	1	2022–23

== European competition ==
Luxembourgian clubs have not participated in European competition since 2002, the last year FIBA organised the FIBA Saporta Cup, with the FLBB bemoaning the separation between FIBA Europe and ULEB and the move away from a single-elimination format. Some of the requirements for participation in the FIBA-organised European third-tier EuroChallenge that restrict their participation are: a €5,000 registration fee notwithstanding other costs, an arena that seats at least 2000 without non-basketball lines, and games played on weekdays.

=== Highlights ===
Competition	Team	Opponent(s)	Round(s)	Home	Away	Aggregate
Champions Cup 1958	(Luxembourg) Etzella	(Belgium) Royal IV	Group stage	43 – 82 (Note: First European Champions Cup game ever played.)	36 – 63	79 – 145
Cup Winners' Cup 1974	(Luxembourg) Sparta Bertrange	(Scotland) Paisley BC (Romania) Steaua București	Second round (Note: First round bye.); Round of 16	105 – 93; 77 – 108	64 – 51; 77 – 117	169–144; 154–225
Champions Cup 1978	(Luxembourg) T71 Dudelange	(Germany) Bayer 04 Leverkusen (Spain) Real Madrid (Portugal) GC Figueirense	Group stage	78 – 85; 63 – 94; 96 – 87	71 – 97; 60 – 118; 65 – 69	3rd/4 teams
Champions Cup 1979	(Luxembourg) Amicale	(Portugal) Sporting (Italy) Emerson Varese	Group stage	87 – 82; 68 – 108	99 – 94; 71 – 123	2nd/3 teams
Champions Cup 1991	(Luxembourg) Telekurs Hiefenech	(East Germany) BSG AdW Berlin (Spain) FC Barcelona	First round Round of 16	98 – 84; 73 – 113	92 – 96; 77 – 117	190–180; 150–230
Korać Cup 1994	(Luxembourg) Telekurs Hiefenech	(Wales) Cardiff Bay Heat (Germany) EnBW Ludwigsburg	First round Second round	78 – 72; 80 – 86	89 – 79; 69 – 105	167–151; 149–191
