= Black Star Mersch =

Professional basketball team in Mersch, Luxembourg

- Leagues: Nationale 2
- Founded: 1934; 91 years ago
- Arena: Sports Center Mersch
- Capacity: 900
- Location: Mersch, Luxembourg
- Championships: 2 Luxembourgian Leagues
- Website: blackstar-mersch.lu
Home	Away

Black Star Mersch is a basketball team based in Mersch, Luxembourg. The team was founded in 1934 and plays in the Nationale 2, Luxembourg's second-tier league. The team previously played in the Total League, where they won championships in 1966 and 1968.

== Honors ==
- Nationale 1
  - Winners (2): 1965–66, 1967–68

== European competitions ==
Season	Competition	Round	Club	Home	Away
1966–67	FIBA European Champions Cup	R1	(Spain) Real Madrid	44–100	125–47
1968–69	FIBA European Champions Cup	R1	(Italy) Oransoda Cantù	53–124	97–51
