= Sparta Bertrange =

Professional basketball club in Bertrange, Luxembourg

- Leagues: Total League
- Founded: 1935; 91 years ago
- Arena: Atert
- Capacity: 2,000
- Location: Bertrange, Luxembourg
- President: Romain Hoffmann
- Head coach: Christophe Flammang
- Championships: 11 Luxembourg Champions; 5 Luxembourg Cups

Basket-Ball Club Sparta Bertrange, also known as simply Sparta, is a Luxembourgish professional basketball team from Bertrange. The club plays in the Total League, the highest level of the national championship. The last few years Sparta is known for its good youth Teams as they have won several Championships. The basketball education for youth is at a very high-level compared to the rest of Luxembourg.

== History ==
Sparta was founded in 1935 and is one of the clubs with the most titles in the high level domestic league. The colors of the club are red and white. The arena "Atert" has a capacity of 2,000 seats.

== Honours ==
- Luxembourgish League

Winners (11): 1957–58, 1959–60, 1968–69, 1973–74, 1978–79, 1985–86, 1986–87, 2004–05, 2006–07, 2007–08, 2011–12

- Luxembourgish Cup

Winners (5): 1959–60, 1972–73, 1984–85, 1996–97, 2009–10

== Headcoaches since 2000 ==
- 2000-2004 : Toni Ostojic
- 2004-2007 : Michel Baiverlin
- January 2007 - Mai 2007 : Olaf Stolz
- 2007-2009 : Philippe Giberti
- December 2009 : Christophe Flammang (intérim)
- January 2010 - Juillet 2010 : Doug Marty
- 2010-2011 : Olaf Stolz
- 2011- January 2014 : Rainer Kloss
- January 2014 - Juillet 2014 : Doug Marty
- 2014 - January 2015 : Bob Adam
- January 2015 - 2017 : Philippe Giberti
- 2017-2018: Arnaud Ricoux
- 2018: Jason Price
- 2018 - 2020 : Kevin Magdowski
- 2020-2021: Pascal Meurs
- 2021-2022 (November): Chris Wulff
- 2022 (déc.) - 2023 (jan.): Christophe Flammang
- 2023 (jan.) - present: Karl Abou Khalil
