= Basket Racing Club Luxembourg =

Luxembourgish basketball club

Basket Racing Club Luxembourg (also Racing Luxembourg) is a Luxembourgish professional basketball club. The club has won the national championship 3 times, along with 1 Luxembourg Cup.

== Honours ==
=== Luxembourgian League ===
- Winners (3): 1966–67, 1997–98, 1999–00

=== Luxembourgian Cup ===
- Winners (1): 2000-01
