= AB Contern =

Professional basketball club in Contern, Luxembourg

Amis du Basket-Ball Contern is a semi professional basketball club from Contern, Luxembourg. The men's team plays in the LBBL and their home venue is Hall Sportif Contern. The club was established in 1956.

== Honours ==
Luxembourgian League

- Winners (4): 1987–88, 2000–01, 2003–04, 2008–09

Luxembourg Cup

- Winners (3): 1986–87, 1989–90, 1995–96
