= B.B.C. Etzella =

Etzella
- Leagues: Total League
- Founded: 1954; 71 years ago
- Arena: Centre sportif du Deich
- Capacity: 2,000
- Location: Ettelbruck, Luxembourg
- 2018–19 position: Total League, 1st of 10
- Championships: 15 Luxembourg League
Home	Away

Basketball Club Etzella, better known simply as Etzella, is a Luxembourgish professional basketball club based in Ettelbruck. The club competes in the Total League. The team has won the national championship 15 times.

== Notable players ==
- Ronnie Harrell (born 1996)
