= Olimpia Milano in international competitions =

Italian basketball statistics

Olimpia Milano history and statistics in FIBA Europe and Euroleague Basketball (company) competitions.

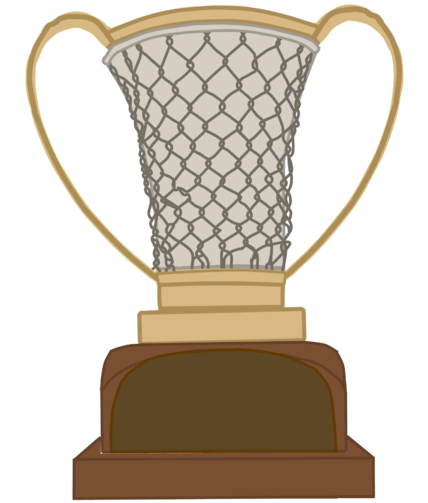
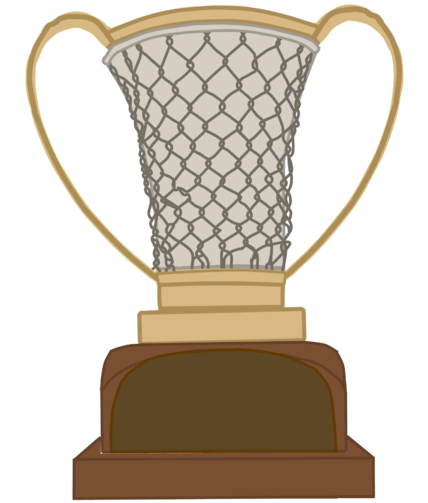
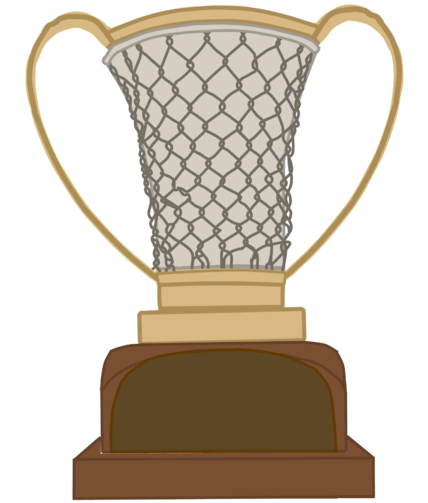
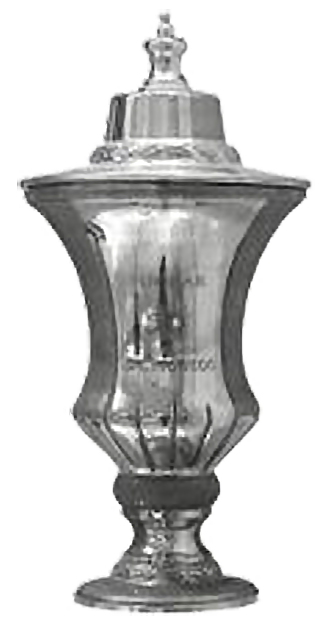
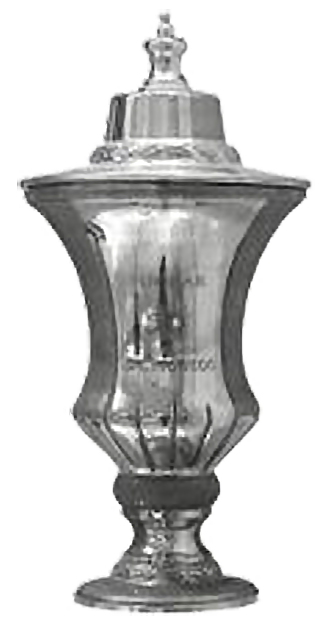
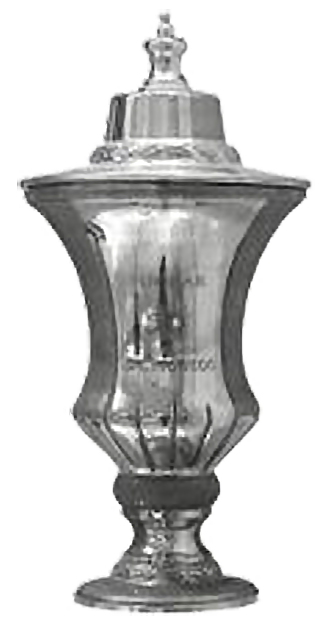

== European competitions ==
Record	Round	Opponent club					
1958 FIBA European Champions Cup 1st–tier
4–1	1st round	(Netherlands) The Wolves Amsterdam	115–47 (h)	90–42 (a)			
4–1	2nd round	(Czechoslovakia) Slovan Orbis	65–47; Milan				
4–1	2nd round	(Hungary) Honvéd	80–72*; Milan				
4–1	QF	(Hungary) Honvéd	80–72* (h)	85–95 (a)			
1958–59 FIBA European Champions Cup 1st–tier
	2nd round	(United Arab Republic) Al-Gezira	Simmenthal withdrew without games				
1962–63 FIBA European Champions Cup 1st–tier
4–1	1st round	(Morocco) Alliance Casablanca	110–60; Casablanca				
4–1	2nd round	(West Germany) Alemannia Aachen	69–67 (a)	76–53 (h)			
4–1	QF	(Soviet Union) Dinamo Tbilisi	70–65 (a)	68–74 (h)			
1963–64 FIBA European Champions Cup 1st–tier
4–2	2nd round	(Belgium) Antwerpse	90–84 (a)	90–86 (h)			
4–2	QF	(Finland) Helsingin Kisa-Toverit	99–70 (h)	87–97 (a)			
4–2	SF	(Spain) Real Madrid	82–77 (a)	78–101 (h)			
1965–66 FIBA European Champions Cup 1st–tier
9–3	1st round	(West Germany) Gießen 46ers	88–77 (a)	103–73 (h)			
9–3	2nd round	(Israel) Hapoel Tel Aviv	80–65 (a)	87–53 (h)			
9–3	QF	(Belgium) Racing Mechelen	94–104 (a)	95–66 (h)			
9–3	QF	(Czechoslovakia) Slavia VŠ Praha	96–77 (h)	59–82 (a)			
9–3	QF	(Spain) Real Madrid	66–71 (a)	93–76 (h)			
9–3	SF	(Soviet Union) CSKA Moscow	68–57; March 29, Palazzo dello sport, Bologna				
9–3	F	(Czechoslovakia) Slavia VŠ Praha	77–72; April 1, Palazzo dello sport, Bologna				
1966–67 FIBA European Champions Cup 1st–tier
9–3	1st round	(Iceland) KR	90–63 (a)	113–64 (h)			
9–3	2nd round	(Finland) Torpan Pojat	100–79 (a)	90–80 (h)			
9–3	QF	(Belgium) Racing Mechelen	103–110 (a)	121–104 (h)			
9–3	QF	(Socialist Federal Republic of Yugoslavia) AŠK Olimpija	73–69 (h)	107–92 (a)			
9–3	QF	(France) ASVEL	86–66 (a)	103–85 (h)			
9–3	SF	(Czechoslovakia) Slavia VŠ Praha	103–97; March 29, Pabellón de la Ciudad Deportiva del Real Madrid, Madrid				
9–3	F	(Spain) Real Madrid	83–91; April 1, Pabellón de la Ciudad Deportiva del Real Madrid, Madrid				
1967–68 FIBA European Champions Cup 1st–tier
7–3	2nd round	(Austria) Engelmann Wien	95–79 (a)	76–56 (h)			
7–3	QF	(Bulgaria) CSKA Sofia	112–106 (a)	76–64 (h)			
7–3	QF	(Spain) Juventud Kalso	90–59 (h)	71–72 (a)			
7–3	QF	(Socialist Federal Republic of Yugoslavia) Zadar	75–60 (h)	66–90 (a)			
7–3	SF	(Czechoslovakia) Spartak ZJŠ Brno	64–63 (h)	86–103 (a)			
1970–71 FIBA European Cup Winners' Cup 2nd–tier
9–1	1st round	(Morocco) MEC	105–61 (a)	125–39 (h)			
9–1	2nd round	(Belgium) Racing Bell Mechelen	96–74 (h)	75–71 (a)			
9–1	QF	(Israel) Hapoel Tel Aviv	107–74 (h)	105–80 (a)			
9–1	SF	(Italy) Fides Napoli	86–78 (a)	81–77 (h)			
9–1	F	(Soviet Union) Spartak Leningrad	56–66, March 30, Armija Dvorets, Leningrad; 71–52, April 7, PalaLido, Milan				
1971–72 FIBA European Cup Winners' Cup 2nd–tier
5–2	2nd round	Bye	Simmenthal qualified without games				
5–2	QF	(Greece) AEK	84–57 (a)	117–76 (h)			
5–2	QF	(Socialist Federal Republic of Yugoslavia) Crvena zvezda	86–62 (h)	58–84 (a)			
5–2	SF	(Italy) Fides Napoli	85–69 (a)	76–83 (h)			
5–2	F	(Socialist Federal Republic of Yugoslavia) Crvena zvezda	74–70; March 21, Alexandreio Melathron, Thessaloniki				
1972–73 FIBA European Champions Cup 1st–tier
8–4	1st round	(West Germany) 04 Leverkusen	75–73 (a)	90–87 (h)			
8–4	2nd round	(Austria) Wienerberger	93–76 (h)	82–80 (a)			
8–4	QF	(Spain) Real Madrid	76–94 (a)	92–72 (h)			
8–4	QF	(Israel) Maccabi Elite Tel Aviv	108–74 (h)	88–113 (a)			
8–4	QF	(Socialist Federal Republic of Yugoslavia) Crvena zvezda	108–85 (h)	80–74 (a)			
8–4	SF	(Italy) Ignis Varese	72–97 (h)	100–115 (a)			
1973–74 FIBA Korać Cup 3rd–tier
7–1	1st round	(Socialist Federal Republic of Yugoslavia) Borac Čačak	80–79 (a)	96–76 (h)			
7–1	2nd round	(Austria) Union Garant Ehgartner	86–76 (h)	75–63 (a)			
7–1	Top 12	(France) ASVEL	64–59 (a)	70–68 (h)			
7–1	Top 12	(Socialist Federal Republic of Yugoslavia) AŠK Olimpija	100–89 (h)	59–83 (a)			
1974–75 FIBA Korać Cup 3rd–tier
5–3	2nd round	(France) Denain Voltaire	76–96 (a)	98–74 (h)			
5–3	Top 16	(Socialist Federal Republic of Yugoslavia) Partizan	104–88 (h)	69–84 (a)			
5–3	Top 16	(France) ASPO Tours	65–82 (a)	95–79 (h)			
5–3	Top 16	(Belgium) Sunair Oostende	91–85 (a)	98–59 (h)			
1975–76 FIBA European Cup Winners' Cup 2nd–tier
7–4	2nd round	(Sweden) Solna IF	65–71 (a)	102–81 (h)			
7–4	QF	(West Germany) SSV Hagen	94–79 (a)	107–84 (h)			
7–4	QF	(England) Sutton & Crystal Palace	82–89 (h)	81–73 (a)			
7–4	QF	(Spain) Estudiantes Monteverde	107–82 (h)	72–106 (a)			
7–4	SF	(Socialist Federal Republic of Yugoslavia) Rabotnički	90–67 (h)	89–104 (a)			
7–4	F	(France) ASPO Tours	88–83; March 17, Palasport Parco Ruffini, Turin				
1976–77 FIBA European Cup Winners' Cup 2nd–tier
3–5	2nd round	Bye	Cinzano qualified without games				
3–5	QF	(Czechoslovakia) Slavia VŠ Praha	83–97 (a)	105–63 (h)			
3–5	QF	(Socialist Federal Republic of Yugoslavia) Radnički Belgrade	73–87 (a)	99–85 (h)			
3–5	QF	(Soviet Union) Spartak Leningrad	94–69 (h)	86–103 (a)			
3–5	SF	(Italy) Forst Cantù	78–101 (a)	95–98 (h)			
1977–78 FIBA Korać Cup 3rd–tier
7–3	1st round	(Spain) Centro Natación Helios	105–102 (a)	140–76 (h)			
7–3	Top 16	(France) Moderne	96–85 (h)	73–80 (a)			
7–3	Top 16	(Socialist Federal Republic of Yugoslavia) Cibona	87–88 (a)	102–90 (h)			
7–3	Top 16	(Poland) Resovia Rzeszów	86–81 (a)	102–70 (h)			
7–3	SF	(Socialist Federal Republic of Yugoslavia) Bosna	79–76 (h)	81–101 (a)			
1982–83 FIBA European Champions Cup 1st–tier
8–4	1st round	(Turkey) Eczacıbaşı	86–82 (a)	104–72 (h)			
8–4	2nd round	(France) Moderne	85–64 (h)	86–79 (a)			
8–4	SF	(Italy) Ford Cantù	63–69 (a)	71–66 (h)			
8–4	SF	(Soviet Union) CSKA Moscow	94–86 (h)	78–79 (a)			
8–4	SF	(Socialist Federal Republic of Yugoslavia) Cibona	88–76 (h)	95–92 (a)			
8–4	SF	(Spain) Real Madrid	78–82 (a)	83–79 (h)			
8–4	SF	(Israel) Maccabi Elite Tel Aviv	77–69 (a)	69–68 (h)			
8–4	F	(Italy) Ford Cantù	68–69; March 24, Palais des Sports, Grenoble				
1983–84 FIBA European Cup Winners' Cup 2nd–tier
7–4	2nd round	(Switzerland) Vevey	88–71 (a)	98–85 (h)			
7–4	QF	(Socialist Federal Republic of Yugoslavia) Cibona	80–84 (a)	82–69 (h)			
7–4	QF	(England) Solent Stars	61–67 (h)	78–68 (a)			
7–4	QF	(West Germany) Saturn Köln	75–81 (h)	90–80 (a)			
7–4	SF	(Italy) Scavolini Pesaro	78–76 (a)	90–80 (h)			
7–4	F	(Spain) Real Madrid	81–82; March 14, Stedelijk Sportcentrum, Ostend				
1984–85 FIBA Korać Cup 3rd–tier
9–0	2nd round	Bye	Simac qualified without games				
9–0	Top 16	(France) Stade Français	109–88 (a)	108–94 (h)			
9–0	Top 16	(Turkey) Fenerbahçe	108–88 (a)	103–85 (h)			
9–0	Top 16	(Soviet Union) Stroitel	94–86 (h)	84–83 (a)			
9–0	SF	(Socialist Federal Republic of Yugoslavia) Crvena zvezda	109–86 (h)	100–99 (a)			
9–0	F	(Italy) Ciaocrem Varese	91–78; March 21, Palais du Midi, Brussels				
1985–86 FIBA European Champions Cup 1st–tier
10–4	1st round	(Luxembourg) T71 Dudelange	116–48 (h)	117–74 (a)			
10–4	2nd round	(Finland) NMKY Helsinki	106–92 (a)	101–90 (h)			
10–4	SF	(Soviet Union) Žalgiris	79–80 (a)	95–66 (h)			
10–4	SF	(Socialist Federal Republic of Yugoslavia) Cibona	95–111 (a)	90–66 (h)			
10–4	SF	(Spain) Real Madrid	86–78 (h)	89–106 (a)			
10–4	SF	(France) Limoges	83–77 (h)	87–81 (a)			
10–4	SF	(Israel) Maccabi Elite Tel Aviv	95–102 (a)	82–70 (h)			
1986–87 FIBA European Champions Cup 1st–tier
10–4 +1 draw	1st round	(Scotland) Murray Edinburgh	83–83 (a)	101–83 (h)			
10–4 +1 draw	2nd round	(Greece) Aris	67–98 (a)	83–49 (h)			
10–4 +1 draw	SF	(France) Orthez	73–75 (a)	84–75 (h)			
10–4 +1 draw	SF	(Israel) Maccabi Elite Tel Aviv	97–79 (a)	79–94 (h)			
10–4 +1 draw	SF	(Soviet Union) Žalgiris	75–71 (h)	100–85 (a)			
10–4 +1 draw	SF	(Spain) Real Madrid	75–73 (h)	96–99 (a)			
10–4 +1 draw	SF	(Socialist Federal Republic of Yugoslavia) Zadar	85–78 (a)	106–85 (h)			
10–4 +1 draw	F	(Israel) Maccabi Elite Tel Aviv	71–69; April 2, Centre Intercommunal de Glace de Malley, Lausanne				
1987–88 FIBA European Champions Cup 1st–tier
12–5	2nd round	(Bulgaria) Balkan Botevgrad	93–79 (a)	97–88 (h)			
12–5	QF	(West Germany) Saturn Köln	78–102 (a)	115–104 (h)			
12–5	QF	(Socialist Federal Republic of Yugoslavia) Partizan	93–83 (h)	85–92 (a)			
12–5	QF	(Netherlands) Nashua EBBC	96–92 (h)	85–80 (a)			
12–5	QF	(Israel) Maccabi Elite Tel Aviv	99–93 (a)	113–81 (h)			
12–5	QF	(France) Orthez	80–78 (a)	87–77 (h)			
12–5	QF	(Spain) FC Barcelona	94–100 (h)	87–102 (a)			
12–5	QF	(Greece) Aris	95–120 (a)	97–82 (h)			
12–5	SF	(Greece) Aris	87–82; April 5, Flanders Expo, Ghent				
12–5	F	(Israel) Maccabi Elite Tel Aviv	90–84; April 7, Flanders Expo, Ghent				
1988–89 FIBA Korać Cup 3rd–tier
9–1	2nd round	(Finland) Torpan Pojat	90–88 (a)	130–83 (h)			
9–1	Top 16	(Spain) CAI Zaragoza	95–85 (a)	105–73 (h)			
9–1	Top 16	(Socialist Federal Republic of Yugoslavia) Crvena zvezda	101–81 (h)	90–80 (a)			
9–1	Top 16	(Belgium) Maes Pils	93–88 (a)	93–72 (h)			
9–1	SF	(Italy) Wiwa Vismara Cantù	81–95 (a)	70–65 (h)			
1989–90 FIBA European Champions Cup 1st–tier
11–7	1st round	(Portugal) Benfica	112–99 (a)	92–73 (h)			
11–7	2nd round	(England) Bracknell Tigers	115–95 (a)	126–103 (h)			
11–7	QF	(Netherlands) Commodore Den Helder	89–81 (a)	104–87 (h)			
11–7	QF	(Socialist Federal Republic of Yugoslavia) Jugoplastika	73–84 (h)	89–95 (a)			
11–7	QF	(Greece) Aris	77–95 (a)	100–92 (h)			
11–7	QF	(Poland) Lech Poznań	104–92 (a)	99–82 (h)			
11–7	QF	(Spain) FC Barcelona	94–93 (h)	85–97 (a)			
11–7	QF	(Israel) Maccabi Elite Tel Aviv	76–88 (a)	106–104 (h)			
11–7	QF	(France) Limoges	99–104 (h)	76–85 (a)			
1991–92 FIBA European League 1st–tier
15–5	2nd round	(Finland) KTP	105–84 (a)	106–70 (h)			
15–5	Top 16	(Belgium) Maes Pils	97–68 (a)	113–93 (h)			
15–5	Top 16	(Spain) Montigalà Joventut	103–107 (h)	81–75 (a)			
15–5	Top 16	(Federal Republic of Yugoslavia) Partizan	70–86 (a)	89–94 (h)			
15–5	Top 16	(Germany) Bayer 04 Leverkusen	103–82 (h)	72–67 (a)			
15–5	Top 16	(Spain) Estudiantes Caja Postal	68–74 (a)	70–65 (h)			
15–5	Top 16	(Greece) Aris	111–108 (a)	117–86 (h)			
15–5	Top 16	(Netherlands) Commodore Den Helder	88–78 (h)	82–78 (a)			
15–5	QF	(Spain) FC Barcelona	80–79 (h)	86–71 (a)	– (a)		
15–5	SF	(Federal Republic of Yugoslavia) Partizan	75–82; April 14, Abdi İpekçi Arena, Istanbul				
15–5	3rd place game	(Spain) Estudiantes Caja Postal	99–81; April 16, Abdi İpekçi Arena, Istanbul				
1992–93 FIBA Korać Cup 3rd–tier
14–2	2nd round	(Belgium) Bruxellois	97–67 (a)	99–75 (h)			
14–2	3rd round	(Croatia) Šibenik Zagreb Montaža	85–80 (a)	113–97 (h)			
14–2	Top 16	(Greece) Nikas Peristeri	90–78 (a)	89–78 (h)			
14–2	Top 16	(Spain) Elosúa León	86–84 (h)	75–77 (a)			
14–2	Top 16	(France) Gravelines	78–68 (a)	104–79 (h)			
14–2	QF	(Greece) Chipita Panionios	79–78 (a)	81–74 (h)			
14–2	SF	(Italy) Clear Cantù	72–74 (a)	85–72 (h)			
14–2	F	(Italy) Virtus Roma	95–90, March 9, PalaEur, Rome; 106–91, March 18, Forum di Milanofiori, Assago				
1993–94 FIBA Korać Cup 3rd–tier
8–4	2nd round	Bye	Recoaro qualified without games				
8–4	3rd round	(Belgium) Bobcat Gent	86–65 (a)	99–64 (h)			
8–4	Top 16	(Croatia) Zagreb	93–63 (a)	78–84 (h)			
8–4	Top 16	(Greece) PAOK Bravo	76–74 (h)	67–71 (a)			
8–4	Top 16	(Spain) Caja San Fernando	97–85 (a)	108–82 (h)			
8–4	QF	(France) Olympique Antibes	98–85 (h)	88–95 (a)			
8–4	SF	(Italy) Stefanel Trieste	79–96 (a)	103–96 (h)			
1994–95 FIBA Korać Cup 3rd–tier
9–4 +1 draw	2nd round	Bye	Stefanel qualified without games				
9–4 +1 draw	3rd round	(Estonia) Kalev	89–68 (a)	77–72 (h)			
9–4 +1 draw	Top 16	(Spain) Cáceres	67–70 (a)	86–93 (h)			
9–4 +1 draw	Top 16	(Greece) Nikas Peristeri	90–91 (a)	98–52 (h)			
9–4 +1 draw	Top 16	(Israel) Hapoel Eilat	80–71 (h)	82–74 (a)			
9–4 +1 draw	QF	(Greece) Chipita Panionios	73–59 (h)	82–73 (a)			
9–4 +1 draw	SF	(France) Pau-Orthez	82–76 (a)	90–85 (h)			
9–4 +1 draw	F	(Germany) Alba Berlin	87–87, March 8, Forum di Milanofiori, Assago; 79–85, March 15, Deutschlandhalle, Berlin				
1995–96 FIBA Korać Cup 3rd–tier
11–3	2nd round	Bye	Stefanel qualified without games				
11–3	3rd round	(Lithuania) Šiauliai	81–74 (a)	91–56 (h)			
11–3	Top 16	(Spain) Estudiantes Argentaria	87–68 (h)	76–86 (a)			
11–3	Top 16	(Greece) Soulis Sporting	100–96 (a)	110–83 (h)			
11–3	Top 16	(Turkey) Fenerbahçe	81–67 (a)	79–73 (h)			
11–3	QF	(Italy) Cagiva Varese	81–72 (a)	89–90 (h)			
11–3	SF	(France) ASVEL	73–69 (h)	81–72 (a)			
11–3	F	(Turkey) Efes Pilsen	68–76, March 6, Abdi İpekçi Arena, Istanbul; 77–70, March 13, Forum di Milanofiori, Assago				
1996–97 FIBA EuroLeague 1st–tier
14–8	1st round	(Turkey) Ülker	73–67 (a)	67–65 (h)			
14–8	1st round	(France) Limoges	85–74 (a)	79–66 (h)			
14–8	1st round	(Israel) Maccabi Elite Tel Aviv	68–78 (a)	85–88 (h)			
14–8	1st round	(Russia) CSKA Moscow	87–74 (h)	55–70 (a)			
14–8	1st round	(Greece) Panionios Afisorama	90–66 (h)	86–79 (a)			
14–8	2nd round	(Belgium) Spirou	71–68 (a)	73–63 (h)			
14–8	2nd round	(Greece) Olympiacos	73–71 (h)	84–87 (a)			
14–8	2nd round	(Germany) Alba Berlin	78–68 (a)	80–91 (h)			
14–8	Top 16	(Italy) Kinder Bologna	67–59 (h)	76–83 (a)	78–76 (h)		
14–8	QF	(Slovenia) Smelt Olimpija	94–90 (h)	69–73 (a)	61–77 (h)		
1997–98 FIBA EuroCup 2nd–tier
14–5	1st round	(Federal Republic of Yugoslavia) Beobanka	82–74 (h)	79–80 (a)			
14–5	1st round	(England) London Towers	56–65 (a)	102–86 (h)			
14–5	1st round	(Germany) Tatami Rhöndorf	72–58 (a)	93–90 (h)			
14–5	1st round	(Israel) Hapoel Eilat	90–75 (h)	86–75 (a)			
14–5	1st round	(Hungary) Honvéd	89–60 (a)	91–66 (h)			
14–5	2nd round	(Slovenia) Kovinotehna Savinjska Polzela	98–56 (a)	70–55 (h)			
14–5	Top 16	(Belgium) Sunair Oostende	80–68 (a)	82–72 (h)			
14–5	QF	(France) ASVEL	67–58 (a)	62–70 (h)			
14–5	SF	(Greece) Panathinaikos	58–77 (a)	86–61 (h)			
14–5	F	(Lithuania) Žalgiris	67–82; April 14, Hala Pionir, Belgrade				
1998–99 FIBA Saporta Cup 2nd–tier
8–4	1st round	(Slovenia) Kovinotehna Savinjska Polzela	66–67 (h)	66–63 (a)			
8–4	1st round	(Bulgaria) Cherno More	86–63 (h)	87–85 (a)			
8–4	1st round	(Lithuania) Atletas	77–62 (a)	82–62 (h)			
8–4	1st round	(Portugal) Estrelas Avenida	77–78 (a)	73–61 (h)			
8–4	1st round	(Estonia) Kalev	51–69 (a)	86–83 (h)			
8–4	2nd round	(Slovakia) Slovakofarma Pezinok	77–89 (a)	75–72 (h)			
1999–00 FIBA Saporta cup 2nd–tier
6–8	1st round	(Sweden) Plannja	86–67 (h)	60–66 (a)			
6–8	1st round	(England) London Towers	77–56 (a)	80–82 (h)			
6–8	1st round	(Turkey) Darüşşafaka	82–87 (h)	60–64 (a)			
6–8	1st round	(Belgium) Okapi Aalstar	92–68 (h)	74–68 (a)			
6–8	1st round	(Croatia) Split CO	66–77 (a)	72–84 (h)			
6–8	2nd round	(Slovenia) Krka	62–55 (h)	56–57 (a)			
6–8	Top 16	(Poland) Zepter Śląsk Idea Wrocław	57–75 (a)	64–62 (h)			
2003–04 ULEB Cup 2nd–tier
9–3	Regular season	(Spain) Real Madrid	62–61 (a)	94–65 (h)			
9–3	Regular season	(Netherlands) Demon Astronauts	81–65 (h)	73–67 (a)			
9–3	Regular season	(Croatia) Zagreb	97–75 (h)	93–74 (a)			
9–3	Regular season	(Germany) Opel Skyliners	61–67 (a)	69–68 (h)			
9–3	Regular season	(Bulgaria) Lukoil Academic	77–67 (h)	78–84 (a)			
9–3	Top 16	(Spain) DKV Joventut	62–78 (a)	81–69 (h)			
2005–06 Euroleague 1st–tier
5–9	Regular season	(Turkey) Efes Pilsen	66–71 (h)	57–85 (a)			
5–9	Regular season	(Lithuania) Lietuvos rytas	65–59 (a)	95–101 (h)			
5–9	Regular season	(Poland) Prokom Trefl Sopot	71–92 (h)	60–73 (a)			
5–9	Regular season	(Croatia) Cibona VIP	60–67 (a)	84–64 (h)			
5–9	Regular season	(Israel) Maccabi Elite Tel Aviv	95–96 (a)	94–71 (h)			
5–9	Regular season	(Spain) Winterthur FC Barcelona	70–58 (h)	77–75 (a)			
5–9	Regular season	(Greece) Olympiacos	67–89 (a)	75–84 (h)			
2007–08 Euroleague 1st–tier
3–11	Regular season	(Lithuania) Lietuvos rytas	76–83 (h)	62–75 (a)			
3–11	Regular season	(Turkey) Efes Pilsen	70–80 (a)	73–76 (h)			
3–11	Regular season	(Spain) Unicaja	65–74 (h)	70–89 (a)			
3–11	Regular season	(Croatia) Cibona VIP	91–100 (a)	63–72 (h)			
3–11	Regular season	(Greece) Aris TT Bank	77–70 (a)	77–69 (h)			
3–11	Regular season	(Israel) Maccabi Elite Tel Aviv	81–82 (h)	76–91 (a)			
3–11	Regular season	(France) Le Mans	71–63 (a)	63–83 (h)			
2008–09 Euroleague 1st–tier
7–9	Regular season	(Russia) CSKA Moscow	64–90 (a)	80–79 (h)			
7–9	Regular season	(Turkey) Efes Pilsen	71–81 (h)	67–74 (a)			
7–9	Regular season	(Serbia) Partizan Igokea	76–81 (a)	73–59 (h)			
7–9	Regular season	(Spain) Real Madrid	69–70 (a)	70–61 (h)			
7–9	Regular season	(Greece) Panionios Forthnet	77–73 (h)	87–77 (a)			
7–9	Top 16	(Greece) Olympiacos	76–74 (h)	81–84 (a)			
7–9	Top 16	(Poland) Asseco Prokom Sopot	62–60 (a)	72–96 (h)			
7–9	Top 16	(Spain) TAU Cerámica	90–108 (a)	74–107 (h)			
2009–10 Euroleague 1st–tier
3–7	Regular season	(Greece) Panathinaikos	67–75 (h)	68–80 (a)			
3–7	Regular season	(Germany) EWE Baskets	79–70 (a)	79–51 (h)			
3–7	Regular season	(Poland) Asseco Prokom Sopot	83–88 (a)	82–69 (h)			
3–7	Regular season	(Russia) Khimki	68–72 (h)	63–79 (a)			
3–7	Regular season	(Spain) Real Madrid	69–82 (a)	66–75 (h)			
2010–11 Euroleague 1st–tier
4–6	Regular season	(Russia) CSKA Moscow	88–73 (a)	71–65 (h)			
4–6	Regular season	(Slovenia) Union Olimpija	72–76 (h)	75–82 (a)			
4–6	Regular season	(Turkey) Efes Pilsen	74–82 (a)	84–70 (h)			
4–6	Regular season	(Spain) Power Electronics Valencia	80–69 (a)	60–75 (h)			
4–6	Regular season	(Greece) Panathinaikos	71–81 (h)	62–93 (a)			
2011–12 Euroleague 1st–tier
7–9	Regular season	(Israel) Maccabi Electra Tel Aviv	89–82 (h)	76–85 (a)			
7–9	Regular season	(Spain) Real Madrid	78–85 (a)	65–72 (h)			
7–9	Regular season	(Turkey) Anadolu Efes	54–62 (h)	70–84 (a)			
7–9	Regular season	(Belgium) Belgacom Spirou	81–76 (a)	88–53 (h)			
7–9	Regular season	(Serbia) Partizan mt:s	65–69 (h)	72–66 (a)			
7–9	Top 16	(Greece) Panathinaikos	57–78 (h)	67–58 (a)			
7–9	Top 16	(Turkey) Fenerbahçe Ülker	63–65 (a)	85–72 (h)			
7–9	Top 16	(Russia) UNICS	44–59 (a)	63–58 (h)			
2012–13 Euroleague 1st–tier
3–7	Regular season	(Turkey) Anadolu Efes	80–75 (h)	71–77 (a)			
3–7	Regular season	(Croatia) Cedevita	83–71 (a)	75–60 (h)			
3–7	Regular season	(Spain) Caja Laboral	85–95 (h)	62–64 (a)			
3–7	Regular season	(Lithuania) Žalgiris	87–92 (a)	65–67 (h)			
3–7	Regular season	(Greece) Olympiacos	71–84 (h)	81–82 (a)			
2013–14 Euroleague 1st–tier
16–12	Regular season	(Turkey) Anadolu Efes	67–87 (a)	77–73 (h)			
16–12	Regular season	(Lithuania) Žalgiris	82–75 (h)	71–73 (a)			
16–12	Regular season	(Spain) Real Madrid	74–93 (a)	71–78 (h)			
16–12	Regular season	(Germany) Brose Baskets	76–62 (a)	74–73 (h)			
16–12	Regular season	(France) Strasbourg	83–72 (h)	67–76 (a)			
16–12	Top 16	(Greece) Panathinaikos	57–73 (a)	77–75 (h)			
16–12	Top 16	(Greece) Olympiacos	81–51 (h)	88–86 (a)			
16–12	Top 16	(Spain) Laboral Kutxa	83–76 (h)	83–65 (a)			
16–12	Top 16	(Turkey) Anadolu Efes	60–61 (a)	76–69 (h)			
16–12	Top 16	(Turkey) Fenerbahçe Ülker	90–85 (h)	82–73 (a)			
16–12	Top 16	(Spain) FC Barcelona	70–80 (a)	91–63 (h)			
16–12	Top 16	(Spain) Unicaja	70–59 (h)	85–95 (a)			
16–12	QF	(Israel) Maccabi Electra Tel Aviv	99–101 (h)	91–77 (h)	63–75 (a)	66–86 (a)	– (h)
2014–15 Euroleague 1st–tier
9–15	Regular season	(Turkey) Fenerbahçe Ülker	74–77 (a)	74–80 (h)			
9–15	Regular season	(Spain) FC Barcelona	63–78 (h)	80–84 (a)			
9–15	Regular season	(Germany) Bayern Munich	81–74 (a)	83–81 (h)			
9–15	Regular season	(Greece) Panathinaikos	63–90 (a)	66–64 (h)			
9–15	Regular season	(Poland) PGE Turów	90–71 (h)	101–96 (a)			
9–15	Top 16	(Russia) Nizhny Novgorod	59–79 (h)	85–76 (a)			
9–15	Top 16	(Greece) Olympiacos	58–81 (a)	74–83 (h)			
9–15	Top 16	(Spain) Unicaja	84–77 (a)	90–86 (h)			
9–15	Top 16	(Turkey) Fenerbahçe Ülker	71–82 (h)	77–98 (a)			
9–15	Top 16	(Spain) Laboral Kutxa	83–102 (a)	99–85 (h)			
9–15	Top 16	(Turkey) Anadolu Efes	71–73 (h)	78–86 (a)			
9–15	Top 16	(Russia) CSKA Moscow	75–97 (a)	79–88 (h)			
2015–16 Euroleague 1st–tier
3–7	Regular season	(Spain) Laboral Kutxa	78–76 (h)	82–94 (a)			
3–7	Regular season	(Turkey) Anadolu Efes	73–89 (a)	88–84 (h)			
3–7	Regular season	(Greece) Olympiacos	66–71 (h)	63–73 (a)			
3–7	Regular season	(Croatia) Cedevita	68–77 (h)	85–82 (a)			
3–7	Regular season	(France) Limoges	90–71 (a)	101–96 (h)			
2015–16 Eurocup 2nd–tier
6–4	Top 32	(Germany) Alba Berlin	67–83 (a)	91–78 (h)			
6–4	Top 32	(Greece) Aris	95–54 (h)	68–83 (a)			
6–4	Top 32	(Lithuania) Neptūnas	79–71 (h)	74–73 (a)			
6–4	Top 16	(Turkey) Banvit	72–69 (h)	79–76 (a)			
6–4	QF	(Italy) Dolomiti Energia Trento	73–83 (h)	79–92 (a)			

== Worldwide competitions ==
Record	Round	Opponent club	
1967 FIBA Intercontinental Cup
2–1	Qualifying round	(Czechoslovakia) Slavia VŠ Praha	82–77; January 4, Naples
2–1	SF	(Italy) Ignis Varese	70–79; January 5, Palazzetto dello Sport, Rome
2–1	3rd place game	(Brazil) Corinthians	90–89; January 7, Palazzetto dello Sport, Rome
1968 FIBA Intercontinental Cup
1–1	SF	(Spain) Real Madrid	84–93; January 4, Palestra, Philadelphia
1–1	3rd place game	(Brazil) Botafogo	82–54; January 6, Spectrum, Philadelphia
1987 FIBA Club World Cup
4–1	Group stage	(Argentina) Ferro Carril Oeste	99–77; September 15, Palatrussardi, Milan
4–1	Group stage	(Spain) FC Barcelona	91–102; September 17, Palatrussardi, Milan
4–1	Group stage	(United States) Washington All-Stars	111–103; September 18, Palatrussardi, Milan
4–1	SF	(Socialist Federal Republic of Yugoslavia) Cibona	94–83; September 19, Palatrussardi, Milan
4–1	F	(Spain) FC Barcelona	100–84; September 20, Palatrussardi, Milan
1987 McDonald's Championship
0–2	League stage	(United States) Milwaukee Bucks	111–123; October 23, MECCA Arena, Milwaukee
0–2	League stage	Soviet Union	108–135; October 24, MECCA Arena, Milwaukee
1989 McDonald's Championship
1–1	SF	(Socialist Federal Republic of Yugoslavia) Jugoplastika	97–102; October 20, PalaEur, Rome
1–1	3rd place game	(Spain) FC Barcelona	136–104; October 22, PalaEur, Rome

== Record ==
Olimpia Milano has overall, from 1958 (first participation) to 2015-16 (last participation): 338 wins against 207 defeats plus 2 draws in 547 games for all the European club competitions.

- (1st–tier) FIBA European Champions Cup or FIBA European League or FIBA Euroleague or Euroleague: 185–146 (plus 1 draw) in 332 games.
- (2nd–tier) FIBA European Cup Winners' Cup or FIBA Eurocup or FIBA Saporta Cup: 59–33 in 92 games.
- (2nd–tier) ULEB Cup or Eurocup: 15–7 in 22 games.
- (3rd–tier) FIBA Korać Cup: 79–21 (plus 1 draw) in 101 games.

Also Olimpia has a 7 (w) - 3 (d) record in the FIBA Intercontinental Cup or FIBA Club World Cup and a 1 (w) - 3 (d) record in the McDonald's Championship.
