= 2023–24 BC CSKA Sofia season =

BC CSKA Sofia
2023–24 season
- President: (Bulgaria) Robert Gergov
- Head coach: (Bulgaria) Rosen Barchovski
- Arena: Arena CSKA
- Bulgarian League: 5th
- Bulgarian Cup: Quarterfinal
- Biggest win: CSKA 99–64 Cherno More (4 November 2023)
- Biggest defeat: Spartak Pleven 102–70 CSKA (19 April 2024)
Home	Away
- All statistics correct as of 3 May 2024.

In the 2023–24 season, BC CSKA Sofia competed in the Bulgarian League and Bulgarian Cup.

== Players ==
=== Current roster ===
Note: Flags indicate national team eligibility at FIBA-sanctioned events. Players may hold other non-FIBA nationalities not displayed.

CSKA Sofia roster
Players
Coaches

Pos.	No.	Nat.	Name	Ht.	Wt.	Age
G/F	1	(Bulgaria)	Georgi Tsekov	1.90 m (6 ft 3 in)	75 kg (165 lb)	20 – 28 October 2005
PF	3	(Bulgaria)	Deyan Lazarov	2.02 m (6 ft 8 in)	80 kg (176 lb)	21 – 3 May 2005
PF/C	6	(United States)	Cam Gregory	2.05 m (6 ft 9 in)	108 kg (238 lb)	31 – 14 September 1995
PF/C	7	(Bulgaria)	Kristiyan Chelenkov	2.04 m (6 ft 8 in)	100 kg (220 lb)	20 – 7 November 2005
CG	8	(Bulgaria)	Vasil Bachev	1.95 m (6 ft 5 in)	94 kg (207 lb)	34 – 11 August 1992
SF	10	(Bulgaria)	Damyan Minkov	1.97 m (6 ft 6 in)	96 kg (212 lb)	24 – 6 March 2002
CG	11	(Bulgaria)	Ivan Dimitrov	1.90 m (6 ft 3 in)	80 kg (176 lb)	20 – 20 January 2006
PF	12	(Bosnia and Herzegovina)	Aleksandar Radukić	2.06 m (6 ft 9 in)	105 kg (231 lb)	35 – 22 May 1991
CG	22	(Bulgaria)	Viktor Gergov	2.02 m (6 ft 8 in)	84 kg (185 lb)	22 – 20 November 2003
CG	23	(Bulgaria)	Boyan Kyosev	1.80 m (5 ft 11 in)	70 kg (154 lb)	18 – 14 January 2008
F	24	(Bulgaria)	Georgi Boyanov	2.00 m (6 ft 7 in)	94 kg (207 lb)	33 – 9 May 1993
CG	35	(Bulgaria)	Ventsislav Petkov (C)	1.88 m (6 ft 2 in)	80 kg (176 lb)	34 – 14 October 1991
F	77	(Bulgaria)	Vladimir Nankinski	1.97 m (6 ft 6 in)	90 kg (198 lb)	22 – 9 September 2004

Head coach

- (Bulgaria) Rosen Barchovski

Assistant coach(es)

- (Bulgaria) Daniel Klechkov

Physiotherapist(s)

- (Bulgaria) Yavor Kasabov

Legend

- (C) Team captain
- Injured

=== Players with multiple nationalities ===
- (Bosnia and Herzegovina) (Croatia) Aleksandar Radukić

=== Depth chart ===
Pos.	Starting 5	Bench 1	Bench 2
C	Cam Gregory	Kristiyan Chelenkov
PF	Aleksandar Radukić	Damyan Minkov	Deyan Lazarov
SF	Georgi Boyanov	Georgi Tsekov	Vladimir Nankinski
SG	Ventsislav Petkov	Vasil Bachev	Viktor Gergov
PG	Vasil Bachev	Ivan Dimitrov	Boyan Kyosev

=== Roster changes ===
==== In ====
No.	Pos.	Nat.	Name	Moving from		Type	Date	Source
24	F	(Bulgaria)	Georgi Boyanov	Chernomorets	(Bulgaria)	End of contract	4 August 2023	
15	PF/C	(Bulgaria)	Ivan Spirov	Cherno More	(Bulgaria)	End of contract	10 August 2023	
5	PG	(United States)	Marcus Hammond	Notre Dame	(United States)	End of contract	15 August 2023	
8	CG	(Bulgaria)	Vasil Bachev	Academic Plovdiv	(Bulgaria)	End of contract	18 August 2022	
34	C	(United States)	Kaleb Wesson	Indios de Mayagüez	(Puerto Rico)	End of contract	31 August 2023	
3	PF	(United States)	Troy Baxter Jr.	Canterbury Rams	(New Zealand)	End of contract	2 September 2023	
12	PF	(Bosnia and Herzegovina)	Aleksandar Radukić	Ostrava	(Czech Republic)	End of contract	6 October 2023	
17	G/F	(Bulgaria)	Bozhidar Avramov	Spartak Pleven	(Bulgaria)	End of contract	30 October 2023	
6	PF/C	(United States)	Cam Gregory	Sparta Bertrange	(Luxembourg)	End of contract	1 March 2024	
77	F	(Bulgaria)	Vladimir Nankinski	LSB Lecce	(Italy)	End of contract	1 March 2024	

==== Out ====
No.	Pos.	Nat.	Name	Moving to		Type	Date	Source
4	G/F	(Bulgaria)	Martin Sotirov	Balkan Botevgrad	(Bulgaria)	End of contract	22 August 2023	
23	PF/C	(Bulgaria)	Andrey Ivanov	Chernomorets	(Bulgaria)	End of contract	25 August 2023	
27	PF/C	(Serbia)	Dragan Zeković	New Taipei	(Taiwan)	End of contract	26 August 2023	
25	F	(Cameroon)	Tamenang Choh	Antibes	(France)	End of contract	4 September 2023	
3	PF	(United States)	Troy Baxter Jr.	Long Island Nets	(United States)	End of contract	20 September 2023	
77	PF/C	(The Bahamas)	Zane Knowles	Sigal Prishtina	(Kosovo)	End of contract	24 September 2023	
9	F	(Bulgaria)	Aleks Simeonov	Rilski Sportist	(Bulgaria)	End of contract	15 October 2023	
5	PG	(United States)	Marcus Hammond	Lugano	(Switzerland)	End of contract	30 November 2023	
8	G/F	(Bulgaria)	Aleksandar Aleksandrov	Levski Sofia	(Bulgaria)	End of contract	19 January 2024	
17	G/F	(Bulgaria)	Bozhidar Avramov	Supernova Fiumicino	(Italy)	End of contract	20 January 2024	
15	PF/C	(Bulgaria)	Ivan Spirov	Cherno More	(Bulgaria)	End of contract	3 February 2024	
34	C	(United States)	Kaleb Wesson	Élan Chalon	(France)	End of contract	28 January 2024	
0	PG	(United States)	Brandon Young	Al Ahli Doha	(Qatar)	End of contract	28 January 2024	

== Competitions ==
=== Overall ===
Competition	Started round	Final position / round	First match	Last match
NBL	Matchday 1	5th	7 October 2023	3 May 2024
Bulgarian Cup	Quarterfinals	Quarterfinals	15 March 2024	15 March 2024

Updated to match played 3 May 2024
Source: Competitions

=== Overview ===
Competition	Record							
Competition	Pld	W	D	L	PF	PA	PD	Win %
NBL	35	16		19	2,915	2,915	+0	45.71
Bulgarian Cup	1	0		1	66	92	−26	0.00
Total	36	16	0	20	2,981	3,007	−26	44.44

Last updated: 3 May 2024
Source: Competitions

== Individual awards ==
Bulgarian League

Player of the round

- (Bulgaria) Georgi Boyanov – Round 7
- (Bulgaria) Georgi Boyanov – Round 10
- (Bosnia and Herzegovina) Aleksandar Radukić – Round 16
- (Bosnia and Herzegovina) Aleksandar Radukić – Round 20
- (Bosnia and Herzegovina) Aleksandar Radukić – Round 22
- (Bulgaria) Georgi Boyanov – Round 27
- (Bulgaria) Georgi Boyanov – Round 32
