= AEK B.C. in international competitions =

AEK B.C. in international competitions is the history and statistics of basketball club AEK B.C. in FIBA Europe, Euroleague Basketball Company competitions and FIBA Intercontinental Cup.

AEK Athens has won two FIBA Saporta Cups, one FIBA Basketball Champions League and one FIBA Intercontinental Cup.

== Honours ==
=== Medals by competition ===
Competition	Gold	Silver	Bronze	Total
FIBA Intercontinental Cup/FIBA Club World Cup	1	0	0	1
Euroleague/FIBA European Champions Cup	0	1	1	2
FIBA Basketball Champions League	1	2	1	4
FIBA Saporta Cup/FIBA European Cup Winners Cup	2	0	1	3
EuroCup/ULEB Cup	0	0	0	0
FIBA EuroChallenge/FIBA EuroCup	0	0	0	0
FIBA Korać Cup	0	0	0	0
Total	4	3	3	10

=== Medals by year of achievement ===
- FIBA Intercontinental Cup/FIBA Club World Cup: 2019
- Euroleague/FIBA European Champions Cup: 1997–98, 2000–01
- FIBA Basketball Champions League: 2017–18, 2019–20, 2024–25, 2025–26
- FIBA Saporta Cup/FIBA European Cup Winners Cup: 1967–68, 1969–70, 1999–00

=== Final-4 ===
- FIBA Euroleague: 1965–66, 1997–98, 2000–01
- FIBA Basketball Champions League: 2017–18, 2019–20, 2024–25, 2025–26

== FIBA European competitions record ==
Win Loss Draw

Record	Round	Country\Opponent	Home (1 or 2)	Away (1 or 2)	Home\Away (3 or 4)	Home\Away (4 or 5)	Home\Away (4 or 5)
1958–59 FIBA European Champions Cup 1st–tier
0–2	R2	(Socialist Federal Republic of Yugoslavia) OKK Beograd	78–84	125–53			
1963–64 FIBA European Champions Cup 1st–tier
1–1	R1	(Turkey) Galatasaray	73–66	88–68			
1964–65 FIBA European Champions Cup 1st–tier
4–2	R1	(Israel) Maccabi Tel Aviv	64–53	74–67			
4–2	R2	(Belgium) Antwerpse	85–70	71–72			
4–2	QF	(Socialist Federal Republic of Yugoslavia) OKK Beograd	85–78	101–84			
1965–66 FIBA European Champions Cup 1st–tier
8–4	R1	(Poland) Wisła Kraków	72–71	79–81			
8–4	R2	(Morocco) Wydad	125–76	96–113			
8–4	QF	(Socialist Federal Republic of Yugoslavia) Zadar	76–71	69–71			
8–4	QF	(Soviet Union) CSKA Moscow	74–66	81–48			
8–4	QF	(Bulgaria) CSKA Sofia	75–45	94–69			
8–4	SF	(Czechoslovakia) Slavia VŠ Praha	103–73 (a); March 30, Milan				
8–4	CF	(Soviet Union) CSKA Moscow	62–85 (h); April 1, Palazzo dello Sport, Bologna				
1966–67 FIBA European Champions Cup 1st–tier
1–1	R2	(France) ASVEL	64–53	69–46			
1967–68 FIBA European Cup Winner's Cup 2nd–tier
4–3	R2	(Spain) Kas Vitoria	85–65	82–72			
4–3	QF	(Belgium) Royal IV	76–54	74–54			
4–3	SF	(Italy) Ignis Varese	72–52	78–60			
4–3	F	(Czechoslovakia) Slavia VŠ Praha	89–82 (h); April 4, Panathenaic Stadium, Athens				
1968–69 FIBA European Champions Cup 1st–tier
3–1	R1	(Portugal) Lourenço Marques	118–84	77–89			
3–1	R2	(Bulgaria) Academic	73–58	76–54			
1969–70 FIBA European Cup Winner's Cup 2nd–tier
4–2	R2	(Hungary) Soproni MAFC	86–49	97–104			
4–2	QF	(Spain) Juventud Nerva	74–46	87–68			
4–2	SF	(France) Vichy	74–65	78–60			
1970–71 FIBA European Champions Cup 1st–tier
3–1	R1	(Morocco) FUS	95–44	80–84			
3–1	R2	(France) Olympique Antibes	94–88	70–58			
1971–72 FIBA European Cup Winner's Cup 2nd–tier
4–4	R1	(Turkey) Beşiktaş	72–45	66–67			
4–4	R2	(Bulgaria) Levski-Spartak	115–67	103–69			
4–4	QF	(Italy) Simmenthal Milano	57–84	117–76			
4–4	QF	(Socialist Federal Republic of Yugoslavia) Crvena zvezda	100–76	100–63			
1973–74 FIBA Korać Cup 3rd–tier
5–3	R1	(Israel) Hapoel Tel Aviv	20–0 (bye)	0–20 (bye)			
5–3	R2	(Belgium) Standard Liège	92–73	94–76			
5–3	L12	(Socialist Federal Republic of Yugoslavia) Jugoplastika	112–103	97–73			
5–3	L12	(Italy) Snaidero Udine	63–61	96–64			
1974–75 FIBA European Cup Winner's Cup 2nd–tier
3–1	R1	(Netherlands) Raak Punch	72–71	0–20 (bye)			
3–1	R2	(Bulgaria) CSKA Sofia	87–85	74–59			
1975–76 FIBA Korać Cup 3rd–tier
1–1	R2	(Israel) Hapoel Tel Aviv	83–62	95–71			
1976–77 FIBA European Cup Winner's Cup 2nd–tier
1–1	R1	(Czechoslovakia) Slavia VŠ Praha	73–66	106–59			
1977–78 FIBA Korać Cup 3rd–tier
3–5	R1	(West Germany) 1.FC Bamberg	68–62	77–84			
3–5	L16	(Italy) Emerson Genova	82–81	87–62			
3–5	L16	(Socialist Federal Republic of Yugoslavia) Partizan	88–99	93–78			
3–5	L16	(France) Nice	56–59	107–85			
1979–80 FIBA Korać Cup 3rd–tier
1–1	R2	(West Germany) Wolfenbüttel	80–77	97–74			
1980–81 FIBA Korać Cup 3rd–tier
0–2	R2	(Belgium) Standard Liège	78–80	82–81			
1981–82 FIBA European Cup Winner's Cup 2nd–tier
1–3	R1	(Hungary) Soproni MAFC	101–80	98–87			
1–3	R2	(Netherlands) Parker Leiden	78–79	102–67			
1982–83 FIBA Korać Cup 3rd–tier
0–2	R1	(Italy) Latte Sole Bologna	72–89	68–60			
1983–84 FIBA Korać Cup 3rd–tier
3–1	R1	(Luxembourg) AS Soleuvre	114–72	81–106			
3–1	R2	(France) Orthez	83–77	81–61			
1984–85 FIBA Korać Cup 3rd–tier
0–2	R2	(Spain) Clesa Ferrol	77–90	82–67			
1985–86 FIBA Korać Cup 3rd–tier
1–3	R1	(Hungary) Soproni MAFC	105–107	85–88			
1–3	R2	(France) Challans	85–86	102–77			
1988–89 FIBA European Cup Winner's Cup 2nd–tier
3–5	R2	(Switzerland) Pully	73–55	113–100			
3–5	QF	(Soviet Union) Žalgiris	109–95	108–98			
3–5	QF	(West Germany) Steiner Bayreuth	91–85	89–67			
3–5	QF	(Socialist Federal Republic of Yugoslavia) Cibona	91–92	94–82			
1990–91 FIBA Korać Cup 3rd–tier
3–1	R1	(Sweden) Alvik	123–98	92–107			
3–1	R2	(Italy) Phonola Caserta	87–74	100–67			
1991–92 FIBA Korać Cup 3rd–tier
5–3	R2	(Hungary) Videoton	84–69	70–81			
5–3	L16	(Italy) Scavolini Pesaro	83–81	96–65			
5–3	L16	(France) Racing Paris	68–71	63–55			
5–3	L16	(Israel) Hapoel Jerusalem	88–80	83–92			
1992–93 FIBA Korać Cup 3rd–tier
3–1	R2	(Czechoslovakia) Sparta Praha	95–80	82–91			
3–1	R3	(France) Gravelines	85–70	91–61			
1993–94 FIBA Korać Cup 3rd–tier
3–1	R1	(Cyprus) Keravnos	93–54	73–106			
3–1	R2	(Israel) Hapoel Jerusalem	73–52	88–60			
1995–96 FIBA Korać Cup 3rd–tier
6–4	R2	(Austria) Einkaufswelt Fürstenfeld	100–63	88–118			
6–4	R3	(Lithuania) Šilutė	121–100	79–93			
6–4	L16	(France) ASVEL	73–79	69–91			
6–4	L16	(Italy) Scavolini Pesaro	63–72	93–86			
6–4	L16	(Spain) TDK Manresa	83–80	88–84			
1997–98 FIBA EuroLeague 1st–tier
16–6	R1	(France) PSG Racing	57–52	76–52			
16–6	R1	(Slovenia) Union Olimpija	74–65	71–74			
16–6	R1	(Italy) Teamsystem Bologna	80–57	70–67			
16–6	R1	(Croatia) Cibona	70–55	67–63			
16–6	R1	(Germany) Alba Berlin	79–80	60–67			
16–6	R2	(Israel) Hapoel Jerusalem	65–51	68–83			
16–6	R2	(Turkey) Ülker	81–73	63–70			
16–6	R2	(Federal Republic of Yugoslavia) Partizan	68–76	71–73			
16–6	L16	(Croatia) Split	76–46	54–62	–		
16–6	QF	(Germany) Alba Berlin	88–68	58–82	–		
16–6	SF	(Italy) Benetton Treviso	66–69 (a); April 21, Palau Sant Jordi, Barcelona				
16–6	F	(Italy) Kinder Bologna	58–44 (a); April 23, Palau Sant Jordi, Barcelona				
1998–99 FIBA Saporta Cup 2nd–tier
8–4	R1	(Hungary) Atomerőmű	66–59	78–76			
8–4	R1	(Finland) Torpan Pojat	72–60	71–76			
8–4	R1	(Federal Republic of Yugoslavia) Partizan	71–62	87–82			
8–4	R1	(Croatia) Zagreb	77–51	62–79			
8–4	R1	(Slovenia) Pivovarna Laško	87–72	93–71			
8–4	R2	(Federal Republic of Yugoslavia) Budućnost	66–61	74–63			
1999–00 FIBA Saporta Cup 2nd–tier
16–3	R1	(Finland) Honka Playboys	88–51	64–76			
16–3	R1	(Bulgaria) Cherno More Port Varna	103–75	81–103			
16–3	R1	(Israel) Hapoel Jerusalem	69–53	77–82			
16–3	R1	(Belgium) Spirou	83–63	80–62			
16–3	R1	(Russia) Avtodor Saratov	83–59	60–78			
16–3	R2	(Slovenia) Kovinotehna Savinjska Polzela	68–44	51–86			
16–3	L16	(Spain) TAU Cerámica	85–65	67–71			
16–3	QF	(Greece) Iraklis	84–73	73–70			
16–3	SF	(Croatia) Zadar	82–67	75–70			
16–3	F	(Italy) Kinder Bologna	83–76 (h); April 11, Centre intercommunal de glace de Malley, Lausanne				
2000–01 Euroleague 1st–tier
12–6	GS	(Italy) Kinder Bologna	78–77	81–66			
12–6	GS	(Russia) Saint Petersburg Lions	84–73	69–90			
12–6	GS	(Belgium) Spirou	97–73	89–97			
12–6	GS	(Croatia) Cibona	83–75	72–81			
12–6	GS	(Spain) TAU Cerámica	64–52	85–65			
12–6	L16	(Lithuania) Žalgiris	69–60	71–73	–		
12–6	QF	(Italy) Benetton Treviso	97–89	90–74	71–56		
12–6	SF	(Spain) TAU Cerámica	65–90	76–62	67–70	–	–
2001–02 Euroleague 1st–tier
11–9	GS	(France) ASVEL	87–65	86–84			
11–9	GS	(Federal Republic of Yugoslavia) Partizan ICN	106–70	69–74			
11–9	GS	(Spain) TAU Cerámica	85–82	82–62			
11–9	GS	(Italy) Scavolini Pesaro	68–70	68–89			
11–9	GS	(Belgium) Telindus Oostende	86–79	102–73			
11–9	GS	(Russia) Ural Great Perm	99–85	86–77			
11–9	GS	(Croatia) Cibona	72–69	89–90			
11–9	L16	(Slovenia) Union Olimpija	97–87	69–85			
11–9	L16	(Greece) Olympiacos	65–75	75–69			
11–9	L16	(Greece) Panathinaikos	66–73	96–92			
2002–03 Euroleague 1st–tier
1–13	GS	(Croatia) Cibona VIP	69–71	85–71			
1–13	GS	(Spain) FC Barcelona	57–62	68–54			
1–13	GS	(Italy) Skipper Bologna	63–72	82–76			
1–13	GS	(Germany) Alba Berlin	87–88	80–76			
1–13	GS	(France) Pau-Orthez	71–83	86–84			
1–13	GS	(Turkey) Efes Pilsen	64–81	74–79			
1–13	GS	(Italy) Benetton Treviso	90–94	72–59			
2003–04 Euroleague 1st–tier
6–8	GS	(Turkey) Ülker	83–82	75–69			
6–8	GS	(Italy) Lottomatica Roma	79–77	70–73			
6–8	GS	(Croatia) Cibona VIP	73–75	85–80			
6–8	GS	(France) Pau-Orthez	71–83	68–78			
6–8	GS	(Spain) FC Barcelona	64–70	79–62			
6–8	GS	(Slovenia) Union Olimpija	91–87	78–77			
6–8	GS	(Serbia and Montenegro) Partizan Mobtel	95–92	78–71			
2004–05 Euroleague 1st–tier
11–9	GS	(Spain) Winterthur FC Barcelona	91–79	69–57			
11–9	GS	(Lithuania) Žalgiris	76–86	81–71			
11–9	GS	(Italy) Montepaschi Siena	75–71	77–58			
11–9	GS	(France) Adecco ASVEL	89–63	69–73			
11–9	GS	(Israel) Maccabi Elite	110–113	93–92			
11–9	GS	(Italy) Scavolini Pesaro	78–72	88–90			
11–9	GS	(Slovenia) Union Olimpija	76–75	70–66			
11–9	L16	(Italy) Benetton Treviso	83–75	85–65			
11–9	L16	(Turkey) Efes Pilsen	70–69	69–62			
11–9	L16	(Poland) Prokom Trefl Sopot	81–70	59–75			
2005–06 Euroleague 1st–tier
3–11	GS	(France) SIG	73–71	70–66			
3–11	GS	(Italy) Climamio Bologna	82–75	88–55			
3–11	GS	(Lithuania) Žalgiris	80–65	87–70			
3–11	GS	(Spain) TAU Cerámica	60–87	77–62			
3–11	GS	(Slovenia) Union Olimpija	68–77	81–72			
3–11	GS	(Italy) Benetton Treviso	57–83	103–83			
3–11	GS	(Germany) CHP Bamberg	51–65	71–61			
2006–07 ULEB Cup 2nd–tier
2–8	GS	(Spain) Gran Canaria Grupo Dunas	70–58	63–57			
2–8	GS	(Germany) Brose Baskets	82–76	80–71			
2–8	GS	(Serbia) Hemofarm	73–93	93–67			
2–8	GS	(France) Nancy	76–85	86–69			
2–8	GS	(Lithuania) Lietuvos Rytas	76–102	86–80			
2007–08 FIBA EuroCup 3rd–tier
1–1	R2	(France) Cholet	91–82	78–55			
2015–16 Eurocup 2nd–tier
5–5	GS	(Russia) Krasny Oktyabr	94–96	78–82			
5–5	GS	(Turkey) Galatasaray Odeabank	73–86	89–65			
5–5	GS	(Russia) Nizhny Novgorod	87–70	86–79			
5–5	GS	(Israel) Hapoel Bank Yahav	75–74	82–78			
5–5	GS	(Lithuania) Neptūnas	75–71	80–86			
2016–2017 FIBA Champions League 1st–tier
12–6	GS	(Italy) Banco di Sardegna Sassari	78–58	80–78			
12–6	GS	(Turkey) Beşiktaş Sompo Japan	78–88	82–68			
12–6	GS	(Germany) MHP Riesen Ludwigsburg	82–72	72–67			
12–6	GS	(Serbia) Partizan NIS	91–81	65–69			
12–6	GS	(Belgium) Proximus Spirou	89–69	58–80			
12–6	GS	(Poland) Stelmet Zielona Góra	71–64	78–75			
12–6	GS	(Hungary) Szolnoki Olaj	92–49	76–89			
12–6	Play-offs	(Lithuania) Juventus	75–54	77–78			
12–6	L16	(France) Monaco	69–68	95–87			
2017–2018 FIBA Champions League 1st–tier
12–1–7	GS	(Turkey) Banvit	70–74	78–71			
12–1–7	GS	(Germany) medi bayreuth	83–81	80–73			
12–1–7	GS	(Spain) Movistar Estudiantes	79–87	78–85			
12–1–7	GS	(Slovenia) Petrol Olimpija	91–73	71–80			
12–1–7	GS	(Poland) Rosa Radom	96–92	63–69			
12–1–7	GS	(France) SIG Strasbourg	87–88	80–78			
12–1–7	GS	(Italy) Umana Reyer Venezia	84–64	101–103			
12–1–7	L16	(Czech Republic) ČEZ Nymburk	88–98	82–93			
12–1–7	QF	(France) SIG Strasbourg	78–69	83–83			
12–1–7	SF	(Spain) UCAM Murcia	77–75 (h); May 4, 2018 Nikos Galis Olympic Indoor Hall, Athens				
12–1–7	F	(France) Monaco	94–100 (a); May 6, 2018 Nikos Galis Olympic Indoor Hall, Athens				
2018–2019 FIBA Champions League 1st–tier
14–4	GS	(Israel) Hapoel Bank Yahav Jerusalem	75–79	70–83			
14–4	GS	(Germany) Brose Bamberg	93–86	77–73			
14–4	GS	(Spain) Montakit Fuenlabrada	78–71	82–90			
14–4	GS	(Czech Republic) ČEZ Nymburk	80–76	93–94			
14–4	GS	(Belgium) Telenet Giants Antwerp	77–76	64–71			
14–4	GS	(France) JDA Dijon	80–56	80–90			
14–4	GS	(Lithuania) Lietkabelis Panevėžys	65–59	65–84			
14–4	L16	(Greece) PAOK	62–63	75–84			
14–4	QF	(Germany) Brose Bamberg	69–67	71–67			
2019–2020 FIBA Champions League 1st–tier
13–6	GS	(Israel) Hapoel Jerusalem	91–78	85–78			
13–6	GS	(Turkey) Bandırma BK	84–96	50–68			
13–6	GS	(Poland) Anwil Włocławek	83–72	77–79			
13–6	GS	(France) EB Pau-Lacq-Orthez	102–82	67–79			
13–6	GS	(Belgium) Telenet Giants Antwerp	62–51	73–61			
13–6	GS	(Germany) Rasta Vechta	75–79	70–81			
13–6	GS	(Spain) San Pablo Burgos	74–66	93–76			
13–6	L16	(Germany) Telekom Baskets Bonn	92–85	86–90	–		
13–6	QF	(Czech Republic) ERA Nymburk	82–94 (a); October 1, 2020 Nikos Galis Olympic Indoor Hall, Athens				
13–6	SF	(Spain) Casademont Zaragoza	99–75 (h); October 2, 2020 Nikos Galis Olympic Indoor Hall, Athens				
13–6	F	(Spain) San Pablo Burgos	85–74 (a); October 4, 2020 Nikos Galis Olympic Indoor Hall, Athens				
2020–2021 FIBA Champions League 1st–tier
7–5	GS	(Israel) Hapoel Holon	100–96	77–71			
7–5	GS	(France) Cholet	83–81	79–70			
7–5	GS	(Belarus) Tsmoki-Minsk	95–69	90–95			
7–5	Play-offs	(Turkey) Türk Telekom	74–65	78–66			
7–5	Play-offs	(Russia) Nizhny Novgorod	79–78	88–60			
7–5	Play-offs	(France) SIG Strasbourg	77–68	91–73			
2021–2022 FIBA Champions League 1st–tier
1–5	GS	(Hungary) Falco Szombathely	83–89	83–78			
1–5	GS	(Italy) NutriBullet Treviso	77–92	81–69			
1–5	GS	(Latvia) VEF Rīga	88–79	92–76			
2022–2023 FIBA Champions League 1st–tier
10–7	GS	(Italy) UnaHotels Reggio Emilia	68–59	73–84			
10–7	GS	(Germany) Telekom Baskets Bonn	66–73	80–72			
10–7	GS	(Turkey) Pinar Karşıyaka	80–72	91–88			
10–7	Play-ins	(Turkey) Tofaş	73–70	82–85	–		
10–7	L16	(Spain) Unicaja Málaga	65–75	88–66			
10–7	L16	(Turkey) Galatasaray Nef	92–78	71–81			
10–7	L16	(France) Limoges	82–72	63–69			
10–7	QF	(Israel) Hapoel Jerusalem	94–78	64–55	91–51 (a)		
2023–2024 FIBA Champions League 1st–tier
5–7	GS	(Italy) Dinamo Banco di Sardegna Sassari	110–79	79–83			
5–7	GS	(Germany) MHP Riesen Ludwigsburg	84–79	83–79			
5–7	GS	(Poland) King Wilki Morskie Szczecin	86–64	77–86			
5–7	L16	(Spain) UCAM Murcia	79–84	100–89			
5–7	L16	(Greece) Promitheas Patras	67–79	80–79			
5–7	L16	(Israel) Hapoel Holon	108–112	79–68			
2024–2025 FIBA Champions League 1st–tier
12–5	GS	(Israel) Maccabi Ironi Ramat Gan	80–71	95–84			
12–5	GS	(Germany) Telekom Baskets Bonn	96–65	93–74			
12–5	GS	(Latvia) VEF Rīga	80–70	69–80			
12–5	L16	(Germany) FIT/One Würzburg Baskets	84–77	71–77			
12–5	L16	(Greece) Promitheas Patras	97–76	56–60			
12–5	L16	(Italy) Bertram Derthona Basket	93–86	83–82			
12–5	QF	(France) Nanterre 92	76–69	82–70	104–69		
12–5	SF	(Spain) Unicaja Málaga	65–71 (h); May 9, 2025 SUNEL Arena, Athens				
12–5	CF	(Spain) La Laguna Tenerife	73–77 (a); May 11, 2025 SUNEL Arena, Athens				
2025–2026 FIBA Champions League 1st–tier
14–3	GS	(Hungary) NHSZ-Szolnoki Olajbányász	91–77	80–69			
14–3	GS	(Slovakia) Patrioti Levice	99–88	69–71			
14–3	GS	(Latvia) VEF Rīga	95–64	53–69			
14–3	L16	(Germany) Alba Berlin	88–80	88–93			
14–3	L16	(Greece) ASK Karditsa	88–73	62–90			
14–3	L16	(Turkey) Tofaş	96–88	90–93			
14–3	QF	(Spain) Joventut Badalona	87–84	88–66	72–67		
14–3	SF	(Spain) Unicaja Málaga	65–78 (a); May 7, 2026 Pavelló Olímpic, Badalona				
14–3	F	(Lithuania) Rytas	86–92 (OT) (h); May 9, 2026 Pavelló Olímpic, Badalona				
2026–2027 FIBA Champions League 1st–tier
1–0	GS	(Hungary) Falco Szombathely	–	–			
1–0	GS	(Belgium) Windrose Giants Antwerp	–	–			
1–0	GS	(Finland) Salon Vilpas	95–93	–			

Last updated: 8 October 2026.
Source: linguasport.com

== FIBA Intercontinental Cup record ==
Win Loss Draw

Record	Round	Country\Opponent	Home\Away
2019 FIBA Intercontinental Cup 1st–tier
2–0
2–0	SF	(Argentina) San Lorenzo	64–86 (a); February 15, 2019 Carioca Arena 1, Rio de Janeiro
2–0	F	(Brazil) Flamengo	86–70 (h); February 17, 2019 Carioca Arena 1, Rio de Janeiro

Last updated: 4 January 2023.
Source: linguasport.com

== Record by country of opposition ==
Country	Home							Away							Total							
Country	Pld	W	D	L	PF	PA	PD	Pld	W	D	L	PF	PA	PD	Pld	W	D	L	PF	PA	PD	Win%
Argentina	0	0	0	0	0	0	0	1	1	0	0	86	64	+22	1	1	0	0	86	64	+22	100.00
Austria	1	1	0	0	100	63	+37	1	1	0	0	118	88	+30	2	2	0	0	218	151	+67	100.00
Belarus	1	1	0	0	95	69	+26	1	1	0	0	95	90	+5	2	2	0	0	190	159	+31	100.00
Belgium	10	9	0	1	825	688	+137	10	4	0	6	727	787	-60	20	13	0	7	1,552	1,475	+77	65.00
Brazil	1	1	0	0	86	70	+16	0	0	0	0	0	0	0	1	1	0	0	86	70	+16	100.00
Bulgaria	5	5	0	0	453	330	+123	5	1	0	4	354	428	-74	10	6	0	4	807	758	+49	50.00
Croatia	11	9	0	2	881	775	+106	11	5	0	6	822	849	-27	22	14	0	8	1,703	1,624	+79	63.63
Cyprus	1	1	0	0	93	54	+39	1	1	0	0	106	73	+33	2	2	0	0	199	127	+72	100.00
Czech Republic	5	4	0	1	425	402	+23	6	4	0	2	504	548	-44	11	8	0	3	929	950	-21	72.72
Finland	3	3	0	0	255	204	+51	2	2	0	0	152	135	+17	5	5	0	0	407	339	+68	100.00
France	27	19	0	8	2,135	1,954	+181	27	7	1	19	1,954	2,163	-209	54	26	1	27	4,089	4,117	-28	48.14
Germany	19	14	0	5	1,538	1,445	+93	19	7	0	12	1,528	1,483	+45	38	21	0	17	3,066	2,928	+138	55.26
Greece	7	3	0	4	529	512	+17	7	3	0	4	544	517	+27	14	6	0	8	1,073	1,029	+44	42.85
Hungary	8	6	0	2	708	579	+129	8	4	0	4	672	667	+5	16	10	0	6	1,380	1,246	+134	62.50
Israel	15	12	0	3	1,195	1,152	+43	16	5	0	11	1,135	1,221	-86	31	17	0	14	2,330	2,373	-43	54.83
Italy	28	20	0	8	2,170	2,076	+94	28	7	0	21	2,007	2,330	-323	56	27	0	29	4,177	4,406	-229	48.21
Latvia	3	3	0	0	263	213	+50	3	2	0	1	225	214	+11	6	5	0	1	488	427	+61	83.33
Lithuania	10	7	0	3	832	784	+48	9	5	0	4	733	734	-1	19	12	0	7	1,565	1,518	+47	63.15
Luxemburg	1	1	0	0	114	72	+42	1	1	0	0	106	81	+25	2	2	0	0	220	153	+67	100.00
Montenegro	1	1	0	0	66	61	+5	1	0	0	1	63	74	-11	2	1	0	1	129	135	-6	50.00
Morocco	2	2	0	0	220	120	+100	2	2	0	0	197	176	+21	4	4	0	0	417	296	+121	100.00
Netherlands	2	1	0	1	150	150	0	2	1	0	1	87	102	-15	4	2	0	2	237	252	-15	50.00
Poland	6	6	0	0	489	433	+56	6	5	0	1	465	433	+32	12	11	0	1	954	866	+88	91.66
Portugal	1	1	0	0	118	84	+34	1	1	0	0	89	77	+12	2	2	0	0	207	161	+46	100.00
Russia	8	6	0	2	662	612	+50	7	3	0	4	514	548	-34	15	9	0	6	1,176	1,160	+16	60.00
Serbia	10	6	0	4	855	811	+44	10	3	0	7	714	882	-168	20	9	0	11	1,569	1,693	-124	45.00
Slovakia	1	1	0	0	99	88	+11	1	1	0	0	71	69	+2	2	2	0	0	170	157	+13	100.00
Slovenia	8	7	0	1	652	580	+72	8	3	0	5	608	587	+21	16	10	0	6	1,260	1,167	+93	62.50
Spain	24	14	0	10	1,802	1,751	+51	22	5	0	17	1,544	1,757	-213	46	19	0	27	3,346	3,508	-162	41.30
Sweden	1	1	0	0	123	98	+25	1	1	0	0	107	92	+15	2	2	0	0	230	190	+40	100.00
Switzerland	1	1	0	0	73	55	+18	1	0	0	1	100	113	-13	2	1	0	1	173	168	+5	50.00
Turkey	15	10	0	5	1163	1133	+30	15	7	0	8	1100	1146	-46	30	17	0	13	2,263	2,279	-16	56.66
Total	236	176	0	60	19,169	17,418	+1,751	233	93	1	139	17,527	18,528	-1,001	469	269	1	199	36,696	35,946	+750	57.35

Last updated: 8 October 2026
Source: linguasport.com

- Last entry is the first match against Salon Vilpas for the 2026–27 Basketball Champions League group stage C.
- The record after the last entry is 469 matches in total (269W, 1D, 199L, PF36,696, PA35,946), with 236 home matches (176W, 0D, 60L, PF19,179, PA17,418) and 233 away matches (93W, 1D, 139L, PF17,527, PA18,528).
- Single games are considered home or away according to the team's allocation after a FIBA competition draw.

== Statistics record by competition ==
Competitions		Appearances	Played	W	D	L	PF \ PA
1	FIBA Intercontinental Cup	1	2	2	0	0	172–134
2	FIBA Euroleague	14	154	80	0	74	11,534–11,699
2	FIBA Champions League	11	160	103	1	56	12,887-12,104
3	FIBA Saporta Cup	9	70	44	0	26	5,419–5,143
3	FIBA EuroCup	3	22	8	0	14	1,661–1,794
4	FIBA Korać Cup	14	64	34	0	30	5,161–5,080
Overall		51	472	271	1	200	37,934-36,204

Last updated: 8 October 2026.
Source: linguasport.com

== See also ==
- Greek basketball clubs in international competitions
