= Kosta Iliev =

Bulgarian basketball player

Kosta Iliev (Bulgarian: Коста Илиев), born May 13, 1962, is a former Bulgarian basketball player, who played for Khimik Vidin, CSKA and Bulgaria.

He is currently employed by FIBA as sports director at FIBA Europe, and is charged with the development of 3x3 basketball, a discipline which was officially named an Olympic sport in 2020.
