= 2024 Bulgarian Basketball Cup =

Bulgarian Basketball Cup
- Duration: 15 March 2024 – 17 March 2024
- Games played: 7
- Teams: 8
- TV partner(s): Max Sport

Regular season
- Season MVP: Alex Ouandie

Finals
- Champions: Chernomorets
- Runners-up: Spartak Pleven
- Semifinalists: Balkan Botevgrad; Rilski Sportist

Records
- Highest attendance: 4,000
- Lowest attendance: 500
- Average attendance: 1,357

The 2024 Bulgarian Basketball Cup was the 70th edition of the annual cup tournament in Bulgaria. It is managed by the Bulgarian Basketball Federation and was held in Burgas, Arena Burgas. The competition starts on 15 March 2024 with the quarterfinals, and ends with the Final on 17 March 2024. Alex Ouandie was awarded with the MVP of the tournament

== Qualified teams ==
The first eight teams qualified after the first stage of the 2023–24 NBL regular season.

Pos	Team	Pld	W	L	Seed
1	Chernomorets	22	19	3	Seeded teams
2	Rilski Sportist	22	17	5	Seeded teams
3	Spartak Pleven	22	16	6	Seeded teams
4	Balkan Botevgrad	22	14	8	Seeded teams
5	CSKA	22	13	9	Non-seeded Teams
6	Cherno More Ticha	22	10	12	Non-seeded Teams
7	Beroe	22	8	14	Withdrew
8	Yambol	22	8	14	Non-seeded Teams
9	Academic Plovdiv	22	7	15	Non-seeded Teams
10	Shumen	22	7	15	Did not qualify
11	Minyor 2015	22	7	15	Did not qualify
12	Levski	22	6	16	Did not qualify

== Draw ==
The draw for the 2024 Bulgarian Basketball Cup took place on 1 March 2024. The seeded teams were paired in the quarterfinals with the non-seeded teams. There were no restrictions for the semifinals draw. Prior to the start of the competition, 7th placed Beroe withdrew and were replaced by 9th placed Academic Plovdiv.

== Bracket ==
Quarterfinals
4	Balkan Botevgrad	88
6	Cherno More Ticha	69
3	Spartak Pleven	74
8	Yambol	65
1	Chernomorets	92
5	CSKA Sofia	66
2	Rilski Sportist	84
9	Academic Plovdiv	78

Semifinals
Balkan Botevgrad	60
Spartak Pleven	76
Chernomorets	75
Rilski Sportist	73

Final
Spartak Pleven	62
Chernomorets	86

== Quarterfinals ==
15 March	Balkan Botevgrad	88–69	Cherno More Ticha	Arena Burgas
13:00 (UTC+02)	Scoring by quarter: 15–18, 23–15, 28–16, 22–20
Max Sport 2	Pts: Dimitrov 17; Rebs: Dimitrov 9 Asts: Hannah 7 PIR: Dimitrov 27	Boxscore	Pts: Jones 18; Rebs: Ugba 12; Asts: Jones, Kotsev 3 PIR: Jones 20	Attendance: 500; Referees: Nikolay Tsintsarski, Stefan Stefanov, Ivan Lyubomirov

15 March	Spartak Pleven	74–65	Yambol	Arena Burgas
15:30 (UTC+02)	Scoring by quarter: 27–8, 17–23, 15–19, 15–15
Max Sport 2	Pts: Zanna 14; Rebs: Zanna 11; Asts: Toshkov 4 PIR: Zanna 27	Boxscore	Pts: Kiss 21; Rebs: Mihaylov 6 Asts: Lilov 5 PIR: Kiss 22	Attendance: 500; Referees: Slavcho Nuchev, Serafim Petrov, Dimitar Georgiev

15 March	Rilski Sportist	84–78	Academic Plovdiv	Arena Burgas
18:00 (UTC+02)	Scoring by quarter: 24–18, 20–14, 16–26, 24–20
Max Sport 2	Pts: Kostov 17; Rebs: five players 5 Asts: Scott 6 PIR: Kostov 18	Boxscore	Pts: Cummings 33; Rebs: McCall 15; Asts: Cummings 4 PIR: Cummings 32	Attendance: 500; Referees: Ivan Marinov, Mladen Subashiev, Miroslav Kamburov

15 March	Chernomorets	92–66	CSKA Sofia	Arena Burgas
20:30 (UTC+02)	Scoring by quarter: 12–19, 22–12, 27–12, 31–23
Max Sport 2	Pts: McConico 15; Rebs: Smith 8 Asts: Smith 8 PIR: Smith 29	Boxscore	Pts: Radukić 16; Rebs: Radukić 7 Asts: Gergov 3 PIR: Radukić 23	Attendance: 1,500; Referees: Kaloyan Kostov, Vladimir Zanev, Angel Ivanov

== Semifinals ==
16 March	Balkan Botevgrad	60–76	Spartak Pleven	Arena Burgas
16:00 (UTC+02)	Scoring by quarter: 15−20, 20−16, 15−18, 10−22
Max Sport 2	Pts: Minchev 14; Rebs: Minchev 12; Asts: Minchev, Gerganov 2 PIR: Minchev 19	Boxscore	Pts: Purvis 30; Rebs: Zanna 12; Asts: Lomax, Purvis, Thomas 2 PIR: Purvis 26	Attendance: 500; Referees: Ventsislav Velikov, Bikolay Tsintsarski, Stefan Stefanov

16 March	Chernomorets	75–73	Rilski Sportist	Arena Burgas
19:00 (UTC+02)	Scoring by quarter: 20−22, 17−8, 17−19, 21−24
Max Sport 2	Pts: Smith 17; Rebs: Smith 14; Asts: Mcconico 7 PIR: Smith 31	Boxscore	Pts: Arnett, Kostov 15; Rebs: Florveus, Simeonov, Yanev 6 Asts: Scott 4 PIR: Kostov 14	Attendance: 2,000; Referees: Martin Horozov, Ivan Marinov, Slavcho Nuchev

== Finals ==
17 March 2024	Spartak Pleven	62–86	Chernomorets	Arena Burgas
18:00 (UTC+02)
	Pts: Purvis 16; Rebs: Zanna 13; Asts: Purvis 3 PIR: Thomas, Zanna 10	Boxscore	Pts: Ouandie 18; Rebs: Ivanov 8 Asts: McConico 5 PIR: Ouandie 24	Attendance: 4,000; Referees: Ventsislav Velikov, Martin Horozov, Kaloyan Kostov
