= BC CSKA Sofia =

BC CSKA
- 2023–24 BC CSKA Sofia season
- Nickname: "The Army"; "The Reds"
- Leagues: NBL
- Founded: 5 May 1948
- Arena: CSKA
- Capacity: 520
- Location: Sofia, Bulgaria
- Team colors: Red and white
- President: Ginko Vasilev
- Head coach: Yordan Bozov
- Championships: 12 NBL; 17 Bulgarian Cup
- Website: www.cska-basket.bg
Home	Away

BC CSKA Sofia (Bulgarian: БК "ЦСКА София") is a Bulgarian professional basketball club based in the capital Sofia and part of the CSKA Sofia sports club.

CSKA Sofia men's team have been champions of Bulgaria 12 times and Bulgarian cup winners 17 times. They played their home games at "CSKA" Hall in Sofia. In 2006–07, they took part in the FIBA EuroCup tournament, which is the last participation of the club in European club tournaments

== History ==
The CSKA Basketball team took over the AC–23, a team which finished in the second place in the national championship in 1942. In 1946, BC "Chavdar" was formed and finished third in the championship.

Basketball is one of the sports that developed in CSKA right from the creation of the Club on 5 May 1948. This "September in CDV" practically takes the whole male and female teams of AS–23, which proves clearly the relationship between CSKA and the first "army" Club in Bulgaria. The new team continued with the composition and the asset of CDV in the current Championship. In the autumn of the same year second place was won, and in 1949 it won the first CDV and the first in its history title in basketball. It was followed by two more titles over the next two seasons, while men generally earned 12 titles and 17 cups in the country. The founders of the Club were Konstantin Totev, Iliya Angelov, Tonko Raynov, Lubomir Katerinski, etc. Later, on the team played Konstantin Kotsev, who after his career became an artist in the National Theatre. At the time still a soldier, Daniel recited excerpts from plays in front of his teammates and he is remembered as one of the most colourful personalities in the "red" Club.

The strongest periods of men's basketball at CSKA were the 1950s and mid–' 60s and ' 70s, when they earned most titles, and in Europe basketball teams such as CSKA (Moscow), AEK (Athens), Olympiakos (Piraeus) and Huventud (Badalona) have been defeated in the european tournaments.

Thus the basketball CSKA won recognition beyond the borders of Bulgaria as well. Reaching of a semifinal in the Cup Winners ' Cup in 1975 and the quarterfinals of the European Cup in 1966 and 1968 are achieved.

In total, for the period 1948–1974 basketball bands broadcast 26 masters of sports and many of them are national team players.

Among the most famous basketball players of CSKA are Dimitar Donev, Kliment Kamenarov, Konstantin Totev, Iliya Angelov, Tonko Raynov, Georgi Maleev, Tsvyatko Barchovski, Temelaki Dimitrov, Atanas Golomeev, Petko Marinov, Milko Arabadzhiiski, Rumen Peychev and others. In CSKA famous coaches like Lubomir Katerinski, Ilia Totev, Kosyo Totev, Tsvyatko Barchovski, Omurtag Kuzmanov and Petko Marinov have worked.

In the mid–80s, on the European scene the "army men" were still performing well, and would play against the big teams in front of large crowds, which CSKA plays in to this day.

After the changes made on the 10th of November, 1989, the "army" basketball gradually fell into crisis and was on the way of vanishing. The military stopped taking part in developing the sport, which hits the club quite harshly. After 1992 the club cannot manage to win gold in the championship and only wins the "Cup of Bulgaria" in 2005.

During the 2006/2007 season Emil Koen and Vladimir Fedyaev take control over CSKA. They have the ambition to get the legendary team to get up on his feet. The women's team is also recovered, as the "Red angels" make the best season in their history.

In Bulgaria the "Red Angels" won a golden double. The highest achievement is the winning of the prestige "Adriatic league", which is one of the most competitive tournaments in Europe. After winning the golden double, Emil Koen died in 2007.

In the two years after 2007, various owners came and went and in the end the basketball team ended its competitive actions.

Only in 2012 a group of enthusiasts led by Alexander Chamakov and Robert Gergov began gradual attempts to reincarnate the red team. Because of the lack of enough financial resources, they started working solely on the youth academy, but the ambition was that there be a men's representative team starting from the 2016–2017 season. After several seasons in the second level, in 2022 CSKA won the second division (victory against Shumen II in the final) and from the 2022–23 season returned to the NBL.

After returning to the NBL, the coach of the team is the club legend and at the same time coach of the national team Rosen Barchovski. In the 2022–23 season, CSKA reached the Cup final, where they lost to their eternal rival Levski. For CSKA, this is the first final since 2005. For the championship, the army team won the bronze medals, first ranking in the top 3 since 2007. For the first time in its history, CSKA has a second team competing in the second division of Bulgaria. In the 2023–24 season, CSKA reached quarterfinals in the NBL playoffs and in the Bulgarian Cup. In 2024 CSKA didn't apply to play in the NBL, because of financial issues. After 2 years of extinction CSKA returned to the NBL.

== Honours ==
- (gold) National Basketball League (12): 1949, 1950, 1951, 1965, 1967, 1977, 1980, 1983, 1984, 1990, 1991, 1992
- (gold) Bulgarian Cup (17) (record): 1953, 1955, 1962, 1963, 1973, 1974, 1977, 1978, 1981, 1984, 1985, 1989, 1990, 1991, 1992, 1994, 2005
- (gold) BBL A Group/Second League (1): 2022
- European Champions' Cup 1/4 finalists (2): 1966, 1968
- FIBA European Cup Winners' Cup 1/2 finalists (1): 1975
- FIBA European Cup Winners' Cup 1/4 finalists (2): 1974, 1976

== BC CSKA Sofia in European Basketball ==
FIBA European Champions Cup / FIBA European League

Season	Round	Club	Home	Away	3rd leg	Aggregate
1965–66	First round	(Luxembourg) BBC Etzella	90–47	72–51		162–98
1965–66	Second round	(France) Denain Voltaire	86–65	53–61		139–126
1965–66	Quarter–finals, Group B	(Soviet Union) CSKA Moscow	78–63	64–77		3rd place
1965–66	Quarter–finals, Group B	(Socialist Federal Republic of Yugoslavia) Zadar	84–58	53–79	80–73	3rd place
1965–66	Quarter–finals, Group B	(Greece) AEK	94–69	45–75		3rd place
1967–68	Second round	(Finland) KTP	89–61	89–86		178–147
1967–68	Quarter–finals, Group A	(Italy) Simmenthal Milano	106–112	64–76		4th place
1967–68	Quarter–finals, Group A	(Socialist Federal Republic of Yugoslavia) Zadar	89–75	64–79		4th place
1967–68	Quarter–finals, Group A	(Spain) Juventud Kalso	106–101	71–80		4th place
1977–78	Quarter–finals, Group C	(England) Sutton & Crystal Palace	87–86	84–80		2nd place
1977–78	Quarter–finals, Group C	(France) ASVEL	75–66	71–99		2nd place
1980–81	Quarter–finals, Group D	(Turkey) Eczacıbaşı	85–67	86–95		2nd place
1980–81	Quarter–finals, Group D	(Albania) Partizani Tirana	110–91	83–89		2nd place
1980–81	Quarter–finals, Group D	(Italy) Sinudyne Bologna	86–90	75–106		2nd place
1983–84	First round	(Belgium) Sunair Oostende	74–62	76–89		150–151
1984–85	First round	(Socialist Federal Republic of Yugoslavia) Cibona	97–91	73–89		170–180
1990–91	First round	(Cyprus) ENAD	94–89	70–66		164–155
1990–91	Eighth–finals	(France) Limoges CSP	90–105	99–119		189–224
1991–92	Round of 32	(Germany) Bayer 04 Leverkusen	77–132	63–103		140–235
1992–93	First round	(Albania) Partizani Tirana	125–58	107–75		232–133
1992–93	Round of 32	(Spain) Real Madrid Teka	73–103	78–97		151–200

FIBA European Cup Winners' Cup / FIBA European Cup

Season	Round	Club	Home	Away	Aggregate
1973–74	First round	(Germany) Gießen 46ers	93–81	74–75	167–156
1973–74	Second round	(Greece) Olympiacos	79–69	59–67	138–136
1973–74	Quarter–finals, Group A	(Socialist Federal Republic of Yugoslavia) Crvena zvezda	88–81	72–80	3rd place
1973–74	Quarter–finals, Group A	(Italy) Saclà Asti	75–83	59–75	3rd place
1974–75	Second round	(Greece) AEK	74–59	85–87	146–159
1974–75	Quarter–finals, Group A	(Spain) Juventud Schweppes	79–51	65–88	2nd place
1974–75	Quarter–finals, Group A	(Socialist Federal Republic of Yugoslavia) Crvena zvezda	72–75	91–102	2nd place
1974–75	Quarter–finals, Group A	(Belgium) Thorens Antwerpen	64–57	58–69	2nd place
1974–75	Semi–finals	(Soviet Union) Spartak Leningrad	57–64	69–79	126–143
1975–76	Quarter–finals, Group A	(Greece) Olympiacos	99–77	78–91	3rd place
1975–76	Quarter–finals, Group A	(Socialist Federal Republic of Yugoslavia) Rabotnički	90–84	88–117	3rd place
1975–76	Quarter–finals, Group A	(France) ASPO Tours	95–91	84–95	3rd place
1979–80	First round	(Cyprus) APOEL	124–62	111–69	235–131
1979–80	Eighth–finals	(Greece) Panathinaikos	96–93	85–100	181–193
1985–86	First round	(Socialist Federal Republic of Yugoslavia) Jugoplastika	85–84	87–99	172–183
1988–89	First round	(Turkey) Çukurova Üniversitesi	77–68	74–80	151–148
1988–89	Eighth–finals	(Italy) Snaidero Caserta	74–84	80–103	154–187
1989–90	Eighth–finals	(Spain) Real Madrid	92–109	87–95	179–204
1992–93	Third round	(Portugal) Benfica	80–84	83–111	163–195
1993–94	First round	(Slovenia) Postojna	86–77	66–55	152–132
1993–94	Second round	(Turkey) Tofaş	67–63	64–71	131–134

FIBA Europe League / FIBA EuroCup

Season	Round	Club	Home	Away	Aggregate
2004–05	Qualifying Round, Group A	(Czech Republic) ČEZ Nymburk	76–80	81–84	6th place
2004–05	Qualifying Round, Group A	(North Macedonia) Fersped Rabotnički	97–84	81–82	6th place
2004–05	Qualifying Round, Group A	(Turkey) Fenerbahçe	81–86	61–90	6th place
2004–05	Qualifying Round, Group A	(Russia) UNICS	88–93	67–98	6th place
2004–05	Qualifying Round, Group A	(Israel) Hapoel Galil Elyon	80–83	103–90	6th place
2004–05	Qualifying Round, Group A	(Ukraine) Kyiv	92–96	71–94	6th place
2006–07	Round I, Group G	(Russia) Ural Great Perm	78–86	79–93	4th place
2006–07	Round I, Group G	(Turkey) Türk Telekom	75–79	86–93	4th place
2006–07	Round I, Group G	(Greece) Panionios Forthnet	86–83	70–88	4th place

FIBA Korać Cup

Season	Round	Club	Home	Away	Aggregate
1976–77	Second round	(Socialist Federal Republic of Yugoslavia) Bosna	117–100	78–102	195–202
1986–87	First round	(Greece) PAOK	85–83	77–89	162–172
2000–01	Round of 64	(Russia) Avtodor Saratov	75–109	62–92	137–201

== Season by season ==
Men's
Season	Tier	League	Pos.	W–L	Postseason	W–L	Bulgarian Cup	European competitions		
1948	1	"A" Group	2nd				–	–		
1949	1	"A" Group	Champion			5-0	–	–		
1950	1	"A" Group	Champion			6-0	–	–		
1951	1	"A" Group	Champion			8-0		–		
1952	1	"A" Group	4th			6-3		–		
1953	1	"A" Group	3rd				Winner	–		
1954	1	"A" Group	4th				3rd	–		
1955	1	"A" Group	4th			4-3	Winner	–		
1956	1	"A" Group	3rd			4-3	Semifinalist	–		
1958–59	1	"A" Group	7th			14-8		–		
1959–60	1	"A" Group	7th			14-12	Not held	–		
1961	1	"A" Group	10th				Not held	–		
1962	1	"A" Group	5th			3-4	Winner	–		
1963	1	"A" Group	3rd			4-3	Winner	–		
1964	1	"A" Group	2nd			10-1		–		
1964–65	1	"A" Group	Champion			23-3		–		
1965–66	1	"A" Group	2nd			22-4		1 FIBA European Champions Cup	QF	7–4
1966–67	1	"A" Group	Champion			25-1		–		
1967–68	1	"A" Group	2nd			27-5		1 FIBA European Champions Cup	QF	4–4
1968–69	1	"A" Group	3rd			12-12		–		
1969–70	1	"A" Group	3rd			26-10		–		
1970–71	1	"A" Group	3rd			20-7		–		
1971–72	1	"A" Group	4th			14-8		–		
1972–73	1	"A" Group	2nd			19–4	Winner	–		
1973–74	1	"A" Group	3rd			18–9	Winner	2 FIBA European Cup Winners' Cup	QF	3–5
1974–75	1	"A" Group	6th			14–13	3rd	2 FIBA European Cup Winners' Cup	SF	3–7
1975–76	1	"A" Group	2nd			38–11		2 FIBA European Cup Winners' Cup	QF	3–3
1976–77	1	"A" Group	Champion			41–6	Winner	3 FIBA Korać Cup	2R	1–1
1977–78	1	"A" Group	2nd			38–6	Winner	1 FIBA European Cup Winners' Cup	GS	3–1
1978–79	1	"A" Group	2nd			38–6	2nd	–		
1979–80	1	"A" Group	Champion			20–2	2nd	2 FIBA European Cup Winners' Cup	EF	3–1
1980–81	1	"A" Group	2nd			23–3	Winner	1 FIBA European Champions Cup	GS	2–4
1981–82	1	"A" Group	2nd			23–3		–		
1982–83	1	"A" Group	1st	21–5	Champion	2–0		–		
1983–84	1	"A" Group	Champion			23–3	Winner	1 FIBA European Champions Cup	1R	1–1
1984–85	1	"A" Group	3rd			15–6	Winner	1 FIBA European Champions Cup	1R	1–1
1985–86	1	"A" Group	2nd			16–6		2 FIBA European Cup Winners' Cup	1R	1–1
1986–87	1	"A" Group	4th	20–12	QF – 5th	4–2	Fourth	3 FIBA Korać Cup	1R	1–1
1987–88	1	"A" Group	3rd	17–5	Third	2–3		–		
1988–89	1	"A" Group	4th	17–5	Fourth	2–5	Winner	2 FIBA European Cup Winners' Cup	EF	1–3
1989–90	1	"A" Group	1st	18–4	Champion	6–2	Winner	2 FIBA European Cup Winners' Cup	EF	0–2
1990–91	1	"A" Group	1st	20–2	Champion	6–1	Winner	1 FIBA European Champions Cup	EF	2–2
1991–92	1	"A" Group	1st	7–0	Champion	6–2	Winner	1 FIBA European League	2R	0–2
1992–93	1	"A" Group	2nd	21–7	Runner–up	4–2	Finalist	1 FIBA European League	2R	2–2
1992–93	1	"A" Group	2nd	21–7	Runner–up	4–2	Finalist	2 FIBA European Cup	3R	0–2
1993–94	1	"A" Group	4th	26–4	Fourth	3–3	Winner	2 FIBA European Cup	2R	3–1
1994–95	1	"A" Group	10th			7–15	DNQ	–		
1995–96	1	"A" Group	12th ↓			1–21	DNQ	–		
1996–97	2	"B" Group					DNE	–		
1997–98	1	"A" Group	4th	16–6	Fourth	2–5		–		
1998–99	1	"A" Group	7th	8–14	Quarterfinalist	0–2		–		
1999–00	1	"A" Group	4th	12–16	Fourth	3–5	Quarterfinalist	–		
2000–01	1	"A" Group	5th	13–15	Quarterfinalist	0–2	Fourth	3 FIBA Korać Cup	R64	0–2
2001–02	1	"A" Group	6th	10–18	Quarterfinalist	2–1	Fourth	–		
2002–03	1	"A" Group	5th	13–15	Quarterfinalist	3–2	Quarterfinalist	–		
2003–04	1	"A" Group	2nd	23–5	Runner–up	5–5	Finalist	–		
2004–05	1	"A" Group	2nd	23–5	Runner–up	5–4	Winner	3 FIBA Europe League	RS	2–10
2005–06	1	"A" Group	8th	9–13	Quarterfinalist	3–3	First round	–		
2006–07	1	"A" Group	2nd	24–4	Runner–up	5–3	Third	3 FIBA EuroCup	RS	1–5
2007–08	1	"A" Group	6th	22–18	Quarterfinalist	0–2	Fourth	–		
2008–09	1	NBL	Disqualified			3–11	First round	–		
2009–16	-									
2016–17	2	"A" Group	11th			4–16	DNE	–		
2017–18	2	"A" Group	7th			11–13	DNE	–		
2018–19	-									
2019–20	2	"A" Group	Abandoned			3–14	DNE	–		
2020–21	2	BBL "A" Group West	6th	16–12	Quarterfinalist	0–2	DNE	–		
2021–22	2	BBL "A" Group	3rd	15–7	1st ↑	6–2	DNE	–		
2022–23	1	NBL	3rd	20–10	Third	5–3	Finalist	–		
2023–24	1	NBL	5th	15–17	Quarterfinalist	1–2	Quarterfinalist	–		
2024–25	-									
2025–26	3	BBL "B" Group West	3rd	17–3	Quarterfinalist	1–2	DNE	–		
2026–27	1	NBL						–		

Women's
Season	Division	Pos	Cup	European competitions
1950	"A" Group	7th	–	–
1951	"A" Group	6th		–
1952	"A" Group	6th		–
1953–1963	–			
1963–64	–		4th	–
1964–65	"A" Group	5th		–
1965–66	"A" Group	8th		–
1966–67	"A" Group	5th		–
1967–68	"A" Group	5th		–
1968–69	"A" Group	5th		–
1969–70	"A" Group	6th		–
1970–71	"A" Group	6th		–
1971–72	"A" Group	8th		–
1972–73	"A" Group	10th		–
1973–74	"A" Group	8th	2nd	–
1974–75	"A" Group	6th		–
1975–76	"A" Group	8th		–
1976–77	"A" Group	8th		–
1977–78	"A" Group	10th		–
1978–79	"A" Group	10th	–	–
1979–2006	–			
2006–07	"A" Group	Champion	W	Adriatic League – Winner
2006–07	"A" Group	Champion	W	EuroCup – Round of 32

== Players ==
=== Current roster ===
Note: Flags indicate national team eligibility at FIBA-sanctioned events. Players may hold other non-FIBA nationalities not displayed.

CSKA Sofia roster
Players
Coaches

Pos.	No.	Nat.	Name	Ht.	Wt.	Age
G/F	1	(Bulgaria)	Georgi Tsekov	1.90 m (6 ft 3 in)	75 kg (165 lb)	20 – 28 October 2005
PF	3	(Bulgaria)	Deyan Lazarov	2.02 m (6 ft 8 in)	80 kg (176 lb)	21 – 3 May 2005
PF/C	6	(United States)	Cam Gregory	2.05 m (6 ft 9 in)	108 kg (238 lb)	30 – 14 September 1995
PF/C	7	(Bulgaria)	Kristiyan Chelenkov	2.04 m (6 ft 8 in)	100 kg (220 lb)	20 – 7 November 2005
CG	8	(Bulgaria)	Vasil Bachev	1.95 m (6 ft 5 in)	94 kg (207 lb)	34 – 11 August 1992
SF	10	(Bulgaria)	Damyan Minkov	1.97 m (6 ft 6 in)	96 kg (212 lb)	24 – 6 March 2002
CG	11	(Bulgaria)	Ivan Dimitrov	1.90 m (6 ft 3 in)	80 kg (176 lb)	20 – 20 January 2006
PF	12	(Bosnia and Herzegovina)	Aleksandar Radukić	2.06 m (6 ft 9 in)	105 kg (231 lb)	35 – 22 May 1991
CG	22	(Bulgaria)	Viktor Gergov	2.02 m (6 ft 8 in)	84 kg (185 lb)	22 – 20 November 2003
CG	23	(Bulgaria)	Boyan Kyosev	1.80 m (5 ft 11 in)	70 kg (154 lb)	18 – 14 January 2008
F	24	(Bulgaria)	Georgi Boyanov	2.00 m (6 ft 7 in)	94 kg (207 lb)	33 – 9 May 1993
CG	35	(Bulgaria)	Ventsislav Petkov (C)	1.88 m (6 ft 2 in)	80 kg (176 lb)	34 – 14 October 1991
F	77	(Bulgaria)	Vladimir Nankinski	1.97 m (6 ft 6 in)	90 kg (198 lb)	21 – 9 September 2004

Head coach

- (Bulgaria) Rosen Barchovski

Assistant coach(es)

- (Bulgaria) Daniel Klechkov

Physiotherapist(s)

- (Bulgaria) Yavor Kasabov

Legend

- (C) Team captain
- Injured

=== Depth chart ===
Pos.	Starting 5	Bench 1	Bench 2
C	Cam Gregory	Kristiyan Chelenkov
PF	Aleksandar Radukić	Damyan Minkov	Deyan Lazarov
SF	Georgi Boyanov	Georgi Tsekov	Vladimir Nankinski
SG	Ventsislav Petkov	Vasil Bachev	Viktor Gergov
PG	Vasil Bachev	Ivan Dimitrov	Boyan Kyosev

=== Notable players ===
Note: Flags indicate national team eligibility at FIBA-sanctioned events. Players may hold other non-FIBA nationalities not displayed.

Criteria

To appear in this section a player must have either:

- Set a club record or won an individual award while at the club
- Played at least one official international match for their national team at any time
- Played at least one official NBA match at any time.

- (Bulgaria) Dimitar Donev
- (Bulgaria) Kliment Kamenarov
- (Bulgaria) Georgi Maleev
- (Bulgaria) Tsvyatko Barchovski
- (Bulgaria) Temelaki Dimitrov
- (Bulgaria) Atanas Golomeev
- (Bulgaria) Petko Marinov
- (Bulgaria) Milko Arabadzhiyski
- (Bulgaria) Rumen Peychev
- (Bulgaria) Georgi Glouchkov
- (Bulgaria) Kosta Iliev
- (Nigeria) Omorogbe Nosa
- (Serbia) Allan Tošić
- (The Bahamas) Trevor Harvey
- (Argentina) Leandro Palladino

== Head coaches ==
Name	From	Until	Honours
(Bulgaria) Lyubomir Katerinski	1948		3 Bulgarian Leagues; 2 Bulgarian Cups
(Bulgaria) Iliya Asenov		1962	1 Bulgarian Cup
(Bulgaria) Lyubomir Katerinski	1962		1 Bulgarian League; 1 Bulgarian Cup
(Bulgaria) Kiril Semov			1 Bulgarian League
(Bulgaria) Tsvyatko Barchovski		1979	1 Bulgarian League; 4 Bulgarian Cups
(Bulgaria) Omurtag Kuzmanov	1979	1981	1 Bulgarian League; 1 Bulgarian Cup
(Bulgaria) Petko Marinov	1981	1990	3 Bulgarian Leagues; 4 Bulgarian Cups
(Bulgaria) Rumen Peychev	1990		2 Bulgarian Leagues; 3 Bulgarian Cups
(Bulgaria) Rosen Barchovski	1998	2006	1 Bulgarian Cup
(Israel) Jaacob Gino	2006	2006	–
(Croatia) Kreshimir Bashic	2006	2007	–
(Serbia) Vlade Đurović	2007	2007	–
(Bulgaria) Rosen Barchovski	2007	2008	–
(Bulgaria) Ivaylo Zhelev	2008	2009	–
(Bulgaria) Jordan Kolev	2016	2018	–
(Bulgaria) Teddy Bukov	2019	2020	–
(Bulgaria) Hristo Tsenov	2020	2022	1 BBL "A" Group
(Bulgaria) Rosen Barchovski	2022	2024	–
(Bulgaria) Planimir Dafinov	2025	2026	–
(Bulgaria) Yordan Bozov	2026		

- (Bulgaria) Lyubomir Katerinski
- (Bulgaria) Iliya Semov
- (Bulgaria) Kosyo Totev
- (Bulgaria) Tsvyatko Barchovski
- (Bulgaria) Omurtag Kuzmanov
- (Bulgaria) Petko Marinov
- (Bulgaria) Rosen Barchovski
- (Israel) Jaacob Gino

== BC CSKA Sofia II ==
From 2022/23 season CSKA has a second team in the BBL "A" group. The team is not allowed to compete in the NBL and for the Bulgarian Cup. The first head coach is Hristo Tsenov, who led the first team in the second division of Bulgaria until the summer of 2022. In their first historic season, the Reds finished fourth in the West zone, failing to qualify for the National Finals.

CSKA II seasons
Season	Tier	League	Pos.	W–L	Postseason	W–L	BBL Cup
2022–23	2	BBL "A" Group West	4th	14–8	Fourth	2–4	DNE
2023–24	2	BBL "A" Group West	6th	13–9	Quarterfinalist	0–2	DNE

Head coaches
Name	From	Until	Honours
(Bulgaria) Hristo Tsenov	2022	2023	–
(Bulgaria) Planimir Dafinov	2023	2024	–

=== 2022/23 roster ===
No.	Name	Date of birth
3	(Bulgaria) Martin Dimitrov	1 March 2004
4	(Bulgaria) Tsvetan Ivanov	4 February 2005
5	(Bulgaria) Kaloyan Anachkov (C)	30 September 2005
6	(Bulgaria) Mihail Bosev	26 March 2004
7	(Bulgaria) Kristiyan Chelenkov	7 November 2005
8	(Bulgaria) Dimitar Genov	28 January 2002
9	(Bulgaria) Deyan Lazarov	3 May 2005
10	(Bulgaria) Damyan Minkov	6 March 2002
11	(Bulgaria) Vladimir Nankinski	9 September 2004
12	(Bulgaria) Aleksandar Aleksandrov	4 February 2004
13	(Bulgaria) Georgi Tsekov	28 October 2005
20	(Bulgaria) Kristiyan Dimov	6 February 2005
22	(Bulgaria) Viktor Gergov	20 November 2003
23	(Bulgaria) Konstantin Margaritov	14 May 2006
24	(Bulgaria) Kaloyan Kolev	5 April 2007
31	(Bulgaria) Veselin Gospodinov Jr.	30 March 2002
33	(Bulgaria) Martin Rusev	20 May 2004
34	(Bulgaria) Viktor Margaritov	11 December 2002
35	(Bulgaria) Radoslav Raykov	18 April 2006
43	(Bulgaria) Anton Todorov	1 July 2004

== Historical names and years of existence ==
- AC–23 (1923–1944)
- Chavdar (1944–1948)
- CSKA Sofia (1948–present)
  - Septemvri pri CDV (Bulgarian: Септември при ЦДВ), September at the Central House of the Troops in 1948 and 1948/49.
  - Narodna Voiska (Bulgarian: Народна Войска), People's Troops in 1950.
  - C.D.N.V. (Bulgarian: Централен Дом на Народната Войска, Ц.Д.Н.В.), Central House of the People's Troops in 1951 and 1952.
  - CDNA (Bulgarian: ЦДНА, Централен Дом на Народната Армия), Central House of the People's Army from 1954 and until the 1961/62 season.
  - CSKA "Cherveno zname" (Bulgarian: ЦСКА „Червено знаме“), CSKA "Red Flag" between 1962/63 and 1967/68.
  - CSKA "Septemvriysko zname" (Bulgarian: ЦСКА „Септемврийско знаме“), CSKA "September's flag" between 1968/69 and 1988/89.
  - CSKA (Bulgarian: ЦСКА), CSKA – Central Sports Club of the Army since 1989/90.

== Women's honours ==
- (gold) Bulgarian Championships (1): 2007
- (gold) Bulgarian Cup (1): 2007
  - (silver) Bulgarian Cup (1): 1974
- (gold) Women's Adriatic League (1): 2007
- EuroCup Women 1/16 finalists (1): 2007

== WBC CSKA Sofia in European Basketball ==
EuroCup Women

Season	Round	Club	Home	Away	Aggregate
2006–07	Preliminary Round, Group C	(Turkey) Botaş SK	67–68	52–57	2nd place
2006–07	Preliminary Round, Group C	(Israel) Hapoel Tel Aviv	85–64	61–79	2nd place
2006–07	Preliminary Round, Group C	(Greece) Apollon Ptolemaida	86–62	95–66	2nd place
2006–07	Round of 32	(Spain) Hondarribia Irun	69–66	63–72	132–138

Women's Adriatic League

Season	Round	Club	Home	Away	Aggregate
2006–07	Regular season	(Serbia) ŽKK Vojvodina	79–64	80–73	3rd place
2006–07	Regular season	(Montenegro) Budućnost	92–83	70–76	3rd place
2006–07	Regular season	(Croatia) Šibenik Jolly	57–63	75–68	3rd place
2006–07	Regular season	(Croatia) Ragusa Dubrovnik	79–55	84–63	3rd place
2006–07	Regular season	(Bosnia and Herzegovina) ŽKK Željezničar Sarajevo	89–78	65–74	3rd place
2006–07	Regular season	(Serbia) Crvena zvezda	70–54	82–43	3rd place
2006–07	Regular season	(Croatia) ŽKK Gospić	72–78	65–70	3rd place
2006–07	Regular season	(Montenegro) Jedinstvo	59–50	77–61	3rd place
2006–07	Regular season	(Slovenia) Merkur Celje	84–67	70–71	3rd place
2006–07	Regular season	(Montenegro) ŽKK Herceg Novi	109–70	89–68	3rd place
2006–07	Semi–finals	(Croatia) ŽKK Gospić	75–71		
2006–07	Final	(Croatia) Šibenik Jolly	73–67		
