= 1974–75 FIBA European Cup Winners' Cup =

- League: FIBA European Cup Winners' Cup
- Sport: Basketball

Finals
- Champions: (Soviet Union) Spartak Leningrad
- Runners-up: (Socialist Federal Republic of Yugoslavia) Crvena zvezda

FIBA European Cup Winners' Cup seasons
- ← 1973–74 1975–76 →

The 1974–75 FIBA European Cup Winners' Cup was the ninth edition of FIBA's 2nd-tier level European-wide professional club basketball competition, contested between national domestic cup champions, running from 6 November 1974, to 26 March 1975. It was contested by 22 teams, three less than in the previous edition.

Spartak Leningrad defeated Crvena zvezda, the former FIBA European Cup Winner's Cup champion, in the final, held in Nantes, and became the first and only Soviet League team to win the competition for the second time.

== Participants ==
Country	Teams	Clubs	
(Socialist Federal Republic of Yugoslavia) Yugoslavia	2	Jugoplastika	Crvena zvezda
Austria	1	Soma Wien	
Belgium	1	Thorens Antwerpen	
Bulgaria	1	CSKA Septemvriisko zname	
Czechoslovakia	1	Dukla Olomouc	
Egypt	1	Al-Gezira	
England	1	Embassy All Stars	
Finland	1	KaU	
France	1	Moderne	
Greece	1	AEK	
Hungary	1	Honvéd	
Israel	1	Maccabi Ramat Gan	
Italy	1	Sinudyne Bologna	
Luxembourg	1	T71 Dudelange	
Netherlands	1	Raak Punch	
Soviet Union	1	Spartak Leningrad	
Spain	1	Juventud Schweppes	
Sweden	1	Solna	
Switzerland	1	Federale	
Turkey	1	Şekerspor	
West Germany	1	04 Leverkusen	

== First round ==
Team 1	Agg.	Team 2	1st leg	2nd leg
Raak Punch (Netherlands)	71–74	(Greece) AEK	0–2*	71–72
Maccabi Ramat Gan (Israel)	196–168	(Austria) Soma Wien	113–80	83–88
Honvéd (Hungary)	173–159	(Turkey) Şekerspor	89–67	84–92
Al-Gezira (Egypt)	105–181	(Spain) Juventud Schweppes	51–69	54–112
T71 Dudelange (Luxembourg)	129–148	(Czechoslovakia) Dukla Olomouc	61–76	68–72
Embassy All-Stars (England)	161–148	(West Germany) 04 Leverkusen	77–65	84–83
Federale (Switzerland)	176–202	(Belgium) Thorens Antwerpen	86–99	90–103
Solna (Sweden)	175–114	(Finland) KaU	87–57	88–57

== Second round ==
Team 1	Agg.	Team 2	1st leg	2nd leg
AEK (Greece)	146–159	(Bulgaria) CSKA Septemvriisko zname	87–85	59–74
Maccabi Ramat Gan (Israel)	176–182	(Italy) Sinudyne Bologna	114–94	62–88
Honvéd (Hungary)	163–170	(Spain) Juventud Schweppes	83–96	80–74
Dukla Olomouc (Czechoslovakia)	152–183	(Socialist Federal Republic of Yugoslavia) Jugoplastika	82–84	70–99
Embassy All-Stars (England)	181–241	(France) Moderne	100–127	81–114
Thorens Antwerpen (Belgium)	178–148	(Sweden) Solna	98–67	80–81

Automatically qualified to the Quarter finals group stage

- (Socialist Federal Republic of Yugoslavia) Crvena zvezda (title holder)
- (Soviet Union) Spartak Leningrad

== Quarterfinals ==
The quarter finals were played with a round-robin system, in which every Two Game series (TGS) constituted as one game for the record.

Key to colors
Top two places in each group advance to semifinals

=== Group A ===
	1st leg	2nd leg	Agg.
(Spain) Juventud Schweppes - (Bulgaria) CSKA Septemvriisko zname	88-65	51-79	139-144
(Belgium) Thorens Antwerpen - (Socialist Federal Republic of Yugoslavia) Crvena zvezda	98-94	89-116	187-210
(Bulgaria) CSKA Septemvriisko zname - (Socialist Federal Republic of Yugoslavia) Crvena zvezda	72-75	91-102	163-177
(Spain) Juventud Schweppes - (Belgium) Thorens Antwerpen	83-70	78-87	161-157
(Bulgaria) CSKA Septemvriisko zname - (Belgium) Thorens Antwerpen	64-57	58-69	122-126
(Socialist Federal Republic of Yugoslavia) Crvena zvezda - (Spain) Juventud Schweppes	97-79	63-78	160-157

	Team	Pld	Pts	W	L	PF	PA	PD
1.	(Socialist Federal Republic of Yugoslavia) Crvena zvezda	3	6	3	0	547	507	+40
2.	(Bulgaria) CSKA Septemvriisko zname	3	4	1	2	429	442	-13
3.	(Belgium) Thorens Antwerpen	3	4	1	2	470	493	-23
4.	(Spain) Juventud Schweppes	3	4	1	2	457	461	-4

=== Group B ===
	1st leg	2nd leg	Agg.
(Soviet Union) Spartak Leningrad - (Italy) Sinudyne Bologna	93-70	58-69	151-139
(Socialist Federal Republic of Yugoslavia) Jugoplastika - (France) Moderne	94-78	64-74	158-152
(Italy) Sinudyne Bologna - (France) Moderne	85-64	88-89	173-163
(Soviet Union) Spartak Leningrad - (Socialist Federal Republic of Yugoslavia) Jugoplastika	98-78	69-71	167-149
(Italy) Sinudyne Bologna - (Socialist Federal Republic of Yugoslavia) Jugoplastika	81-78	74-87	155-165
(France) Moderne - (Soviet Union) Spartak Leningrad	60-60	79-119	139-179

	Team	Pld	Pts	W	L	PF	PA	PD
1.	(Soviet Union) Spartak Leningrad	3	6	3	0	497	427	+70
2.	(Socialist Federal Republic of Yugoslavia) Jugoplastika	3	5	2	1	472	474	-2
3.	(Italy) Sinudyne Bologna	3	4	1	2	467	469	-2
4.	(France) Moderne	3	3	0	3	444	510	-66

== Semifinals ==
Team 1	Agg.	Team 2	1st leg	2nd leg
CSKA Septemvriisko zname (Bulgaria)	126–143	(Soviet Union) Spartak Leningrad	57–64	69–79
Jugoplastika (Socialist Federal Republic of Yugoslavia)	151–157	(Socialist Federal Republic of Yugoslavia) Crvena zvezda	88–76	63–81

== Final ==
March 26, Palais des Sports de Beaulieu, Nantes

Team 1	Score	Team 2
Spartak Leningrad (Soviet Union)	63–62	(Socialist Federal Republic of Yugoslavia) Crvena zvezda

1974–75 FIBA European Cup Winners' Cup Champions

Spartak Leningrad
2nd title
