= 1975–76 FIBA European Cup Winners' Cup =

- League: FIBA European Cup Winners' Cup
- Sport: Basketball

Finals
- Champions: (Italy) Cinzano Milano
- Runners-up: (France) ASPO Tours

FIBA European Cup Winners' Cup seasons
- ← 1974–75 1976–77 →

The 1975–76 FIBA European Cup Winners' Cup was the tenth edition of FIBA's 2nd-tier level European-wide professional club basketball competition, contested between national domestic cup champions, running from 29 October 1975, to 17 March 1976. It was contested by 20 teams, two less than in the previous edition.

Cinzano Milano won its third title in the competition, by defeating the French League club, Tours, in the final held in Turin.

== Participants ==
Country	Teams	Clubs
Albania	1	Partizani Tirana
Austria	1	Soma Wien
Belgium	1	Bus Fruit Lier
Bulgaria	1	CSKA Septemvriisko zname
Czechoslovakia	1	Slavia VŠ Praha
Egypt	1	Union Récréation Alexandria
England	1	Sutton & Crystal Palace
Finland	1	Honka Playboys
France	1	ASPO Tours
Greece	1	Olympiacos
Iceland	1	Ármann
Israel	1	Hapoel Gvat/Yagur
Italy	1	Cinzano Milano
Spain	1	Estudiantes Monteverde
Sweden	1	Solna
Switzerland	1	Fribourg Olympic
Syria	1	Al-Wahda
Turkey	1	Galatasaray
West Germany	1	Hagen
(Socialist Federal Republic of Yugoslavia) Yugoslavia	1	Rabotnički

== First round ==
Team 1	Agg.	Team 2	1st leg	2nd leg
Partizani Tirana (Albania)	4–0*	(Egypt) Union Récréation Alexandria	2–0	2–0
Sutton & Crystal Palace (England)	140–130	(Belgium) Bus Fruit Lier	73–71	67–59
Ármann (Iceland)	146–195	(Finland) Honka Playboys	65–88	81–107
Al-Wahda (Syria)	0–4**	(Czechoslovakia) Slavia VŠ Praha	0–2	0–2
Olympiacos (Greece)	162–145	(Israel) Hapoel Gvat/Yagur	89–63	73–82
Fribourg Olympic (Switzerland)	142–153	(Austria) Soma Wien	79–67	63–86

*Union Récréation Alexandria withdrew before the first leg, and Partizani Tirana received a forfeit (2-0) in both games.

**Al-Wahda withdrew before the first leg, and Slavia VŠ Praha received a forfeit (2-0) in both games.

== Second round ==
Team 1	Agg.	Team 2	1st leg	2nd leg
Solna (Sweden)	152–167	(Italy) Cinzano Milano	71–65	81–102
Partizani Tirana (Albania)	159–181	(France) ASPO Tours	83–80	76–101
Galatasaray (Turkey)	151–160	(England) Sutton & Crystal Palace	91–77	60–83
Honka Playboys (Finland)	151–168	(Spain) Estudiantes Monteverde	80–90	71–78
Hagen (West Germany)	162–151	(Czechoslovakia) Slavia VŠ Praha	84–75	78-76
Olympiacos (Greece)	142–125	(Austria) Soma Wien	77–49	65–76

Automatically qualified to the Quarter finals group stage

- (Socialist Federal Republic of Yugoslavia) Rabotnički
- (Bulgaria) CSKA Septemvriisko zname

== Quarterfinals ==
The quarter finals were played with a round-robin system, in which every Two Game series (TGS) constituted as one game for the record.

Key to colors
Top two places in each group advance to semifinals

=== Group A ===
	1st leg	2nd leg	Agg.
(France) ASPO Tours - (Socialist Federal Republic of Yugoslavia) Rabotnički	99-83	90-107	189-190
(Greece) Olympiacos - (Bulgaria) CSKA Septemvriisko zname	91-78	77-99	168-177
(Socialist Federal Republic of Yugoslavia) Rabotnički - (Bulgaria) CSKA Septemvriisko zname	117-88	84-90	201-178
(France) ASPO Tours - (Greece) Olympiacos	102-77	69-77	171-154
(Socialist Federal Republic of Yugoslavia) Rabotnički - (Greece) Olympiacos	90-79	71-91	161-170
(Bulgaria) CSKA Septemvriisko zname - (France) ASPO Tours	95-91	84-95	179-186

	Team	Pld	Pts	W	L	PF	PA	PD
1.	(Socialist Federal Republic of Yugoslavia) Rabotnički	3	5	2	1	552	537	+15
2.	(France) ASPO Tours	3	5	2	1	546	523	+23
3.	(Bulgaria) CSKA Septemvriisko zname	3	4	1	2	534	555	-21
4.	(Greece) Olympiacos	3	4	1	2	492	509	-17

=== Group B ===
	1st leg	2nd leg	Agg.
(West Germany) Hagen - (Italy) Cinzano Milano	79-94	84-107	163-201
(Spain) Estudiantes Monteverde - (England) Sutton & Crystal Palace	107-79	87-87	194-166
(Italy) Cinzano Milano - (England) Sutton & Crystal Palace	82-89	81-73	163-162
(West Germany) Hagen - (Spain) Estudiantes Monteverde	86-85	76-109	162-194
(Italy) Cinzano Milano - (Spain) Estudiantes Monteverde	107-82	72-106	179-188
(England) Sutton & Crystal Palace - (West Germany) Hagen	96-86	74-83	170-169

	Team	Pld	Pts	W	L	PF	PA	PD
1.	(Spain) Estudiantes Monteverde	3	6	3	0	576	507	+69
2.	(Italy) Cinzano Milano	3	5	2	1	543	513	+30
3.	(England) Sutton & Crystal Palace	3	4	1	2	498	526	-28
4.	(West Germany) Hagen	3	3	0	3	494	565	-71

== Semifinals ==
Team 1	Agg.	Team 2	1st leg	2nd leg
ASPO Tours (France)	178–173	(Spain) Estudiantes Monteverde	106–81	72–93
Cinzano Milano (Italy)	179–171	(Socialist Federal Republic of Yugoslavia) Rabotnički	90–67	89–104

== Final ==
March 17, Palasport "Parco Ruffini", Turin

Team 1	Score	Team 2
Cinzano Milano (Italy)	88–83	(France) ASPO Tours

1975–76 FIBA European Cup Winners' Cup Champions

Cinzano Milano
3rd title
