= Rosen Barchovski =

Bulgarian basketball player and manager

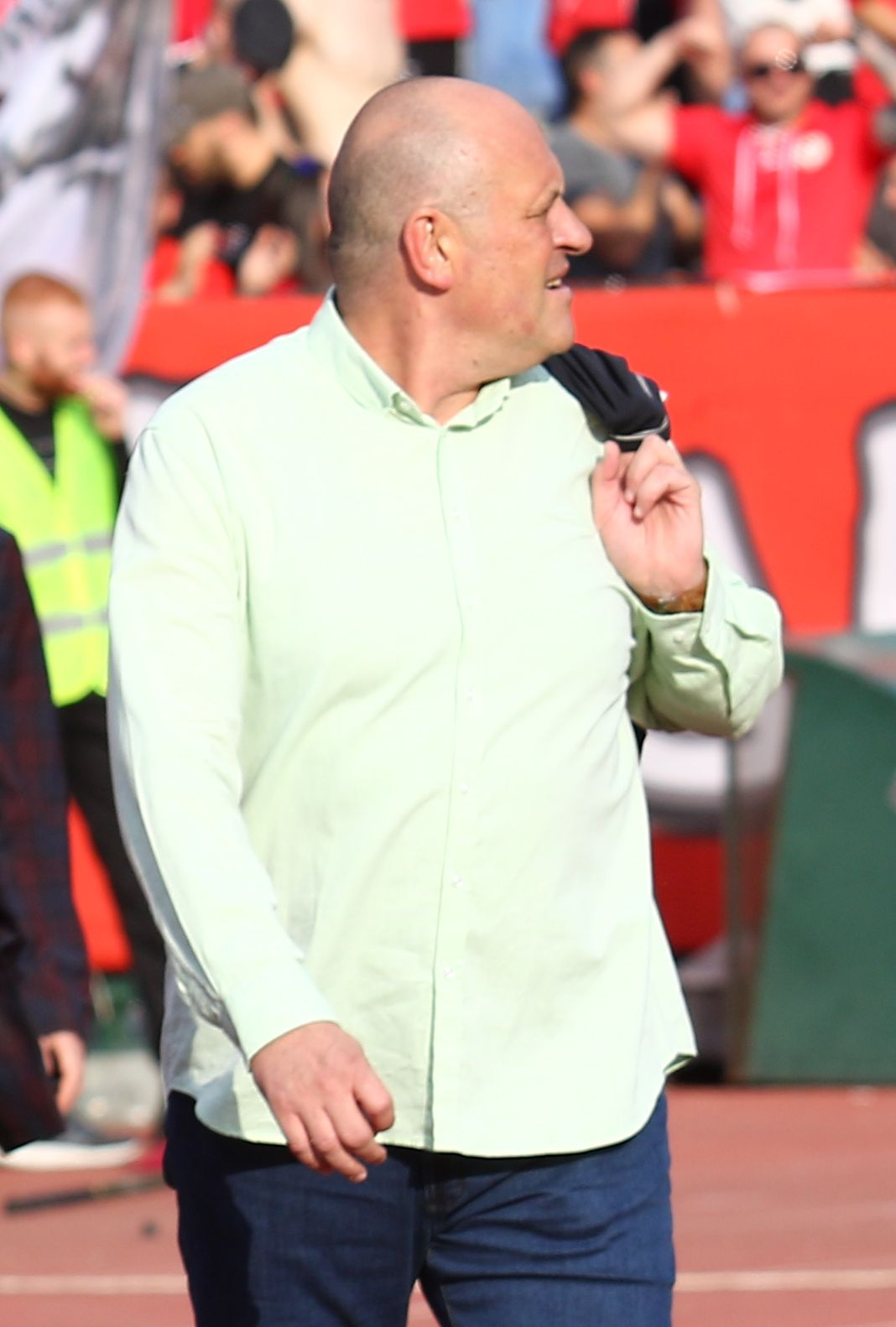
- Rosen Barchovski

BC Shumen

Personal information
- Born: 16 August 1960 (age 66) Sofia, Bulgaria
- Coaching career: 1995–present

Career history

Coaching
- 1995–1997: Slavia Sofia
- 1998–2006: CSKA Sofia
- 2004–2006: Bulgaria
- 2007–2008: CSKA Sofia
- 2008–2009: Dunav Ruse
- 2010–2014: Bulgaria
- 2010–2016: Rilski Sportist
- 2015: Bulgaria U20 (assistant)
- 2019-2025: Bulgaria
- 2022-2024: CSKA Sofia
- 2025-present: Shumen

Career highlights
- NBL champion 1997; 3x Bulgarian Cup champion (1997, 2005, 2016)

Rosen Barchovski (Bulgarian Cyrillic: Росен Барчовски) (born on 16 August 1960 in Sofia) is a former Bulgarian basketball player and current basketball head coach of BC Shumen.

He has coached Slavia Sofia, CSKA Sofia, Rilski Sportist and Bulgaria.

As coach of Bulgaria, he qualified and lead the team to three European Championships 2005, 2011, 2022.

Barchovski is the son of Vanya Voinova and Tsvyatko Barchovski, who are distinguished Bulgarian basketball players.
