= Tours Métropole Basket =

- Leagues: LNB Pro B
- Founded: 1925
- History: AS Paris-Orléans; 1925–195? ASPO Tours; 195?-1981; Tours B.C. 1981–1997; NPO Tours; 1997–1998; Touraine B.C. 1998–2004; 2009–2014; Tours Joué Basket; 2004–2009; Union Tours Basket Métropole; 2014–2021; Tours Métropole Basket 2021–present
- Arena: Gymnase Monconseil
- Capacity: 1,200
- Location: Tours, France
- Team colors: Blue, White
- President: Bruno de l'Espinay
- Head coach: Sébastien Duval
- Championships: 2 Domestic Championships; 1976, 1980
- Website: toursbasketmetropole.com

Tours Métropole Basket (English: Tours Metropolis Basketball) is a French professional basketball club based in the city of Tours in the Centre-Val de Loire region of France.

Founded in 1925, its heyday was in the 1970s under the name ASPO Tours, with two league titles in 1976 and 1980 and a European Cup Winners' Cup final in 1976.

After going through financial strife and successive reorganisations, Tours Métropole Basket is now the heir of the bankrupt club. As recently as the 2017–18 season, it had played in the fourth-tier Nationale 2, but earned promotion to Nationale 1 for 2018–19, and returned to the professional ranks by earning promotion to LNB Pro B for 2021–22.

== History ==
=== ASPO Tours ===
The club was formed as the sports wing of railway company Compagnie du chemin de fer de Paris à Orléans in the city of Tours with the name Association Sportive du Paris-Orléans. It therefore had close links to the railway industry, with a good portion of members either related to or themselves workers in the industry. As such the club later received subsidies from SNCF, the nationalised railway company, also enjoying in kind benefits such as reduced ticket fares.

The basketball section was formed in 1925, a women's section was created in 1937.

ASPO was Touraine champion every year from 1932 to 1940. During the 1950s, after the parent company had been amalgamated into the SNCF, the club was renamed Association Sportive de Préparation Olympique, keeping the same initials. It reached the Nationale, the highest division in the country, in 1950, staying there until 1953 before returning in 1955.

The club saw its first foreign recruits in 1956, two American soldiers from a military base in nearby Chinon.

After beating Berck (crowned champions in 1973 and 1974) by two points in March 1976, Tours won the French league that same year. It also reached the final of the European Cup Winners' Cup in 1976, in only its second participation in a European competition. However, the French would lose 83–88 to Cinzano Milano.

The club had an unremarkable European Champions Cup, not repeating its success domestically either, with two successive seventh-place finishes before a fourth place in 1978–1979.

ASPO Tours was again crowned French champion in 1980.

=== Tours Basket Club ===
In 1981, the ASPO basketball section became Tours Basket Club and became independent in all ways from the other sections of the organisation.

After a series of mid-table finishes, Tours ended the 1988–89 season in the penultimate place and was relegated from the first division.

=== NPO ===
During the 1997–98 season, Tours Basket Club became NPO Tours (a pseudo-acronym in effect signifying New PO), also changing its historical colours of blue and white to red, white and black to mirror the successful Chicago Bulls.

The club had been struggling financially for years and that season worsened the situation. NPO Tours was declared bankrupt on 5 June 1998 with debts of 4.5 million francs, its participation in the league had been earlier denied.

=== Later incarnations ===
Touraine Basket Club was formed the same year, playing in the Nationale 2, the amateur fourth division. In 2004, the municipalities of Tours and neighbouring Joué-lès-Tours pushed for a union between TBC and AS Jocondien from the latter town, which resulted in the fusion side Tours Joué Basket, playing in Nationale 2. However, it proved an awkward collaboration and the club amassed significant debts (€130,000 out of a budget of €380 000) and was declared bankrupt in 2009.

Touraine BC then played alone in the Nationale 3, the fifth division. After repeated requests from TBC, a union was formed with PLL Tours, then of Nationale 2, in June 2014 to form Union Tours Basket Métropole.

== Arena ==
After playing on an ever-changing number of courts, mostly uncovered outside courts, the club moved into the Palais des sports de Tours (known later as Palais des sports Robert Grenon) when it was inaugurated in October 1956.

When the club became Tours Joué Basket it played in the Palais des Sports Marcel Cerdan in Joué-lès-Tours. As Touraine Basket Club it played in the Gymnase du Hallebardier until January 2012. That year it moved into the newly constructed Gymnase Monconseil (capacity:1,200).

== Honours ==
=== Domestic ===
- French League

Winners (2): 1975–76, 1979–80

- French League Pro B

Winners (1): 1966–67

=== European competitions ===
- FIBA Saporta Cup

Runners-up (1): 1975–76

== Notable players ==
Note: Flags indicate national team eligibility at FIBA-sanctioned events. Players may hold other non-FIBA nationalities not displayed.

Criteria

To appear in this section a player must have either:

- Set a club record or won an individual award while at the club
- Played at least one official international match for their national team at any time
- Played at least one official NBA match at any time.

2020s

- (United States) James Batemon III 1 season: '21-'22

1990s

- (France) Makan Dioumassi 1 season: '94-'95

1980s

- (United States) Carl Nicks 2 seasons: '87-'89
- (France) Stéphane Risacher 1 season: '89-'90
- (France) Laurent Bernard 6 seasons: '87-'93

1970s

- (France) Georges Vestris 8 seasons: '76-'84
- (France) Jean-Michel Sénégal 7 seasons: '74-'81
- (France) Jean-Louis Vacher 16 seasons: '72-'88
- (United States) L.C. Bowen 6 seasons: '71-'77

1960s

- (United States) Slem Dewitt Menyard 11 Seasons: '69-'80
- (France) Gilbert Racine 8 Seasons: '62-'70

1950s

- (France) Marcel Kobzik 13 Seasons: '55-'68

== Head coaches ==
- (France) Pierre Dao 5 seasons: '75-'80

== Notable squads ==
- 1976 European Cup Winners' Cup: Jean-Michel Sénégal, L.C. Bowen, Eric Bonneau, Ray Reynolds, Slem Dewitt Menyard, Marc Bellot, Michel Bergeron, Patrick Demars, Christian Albert, Jean-Louis Vacher, Henri Barre, Daniel Boué (Coach: Pierre Dao)
