= Combo guard =

Basketball position

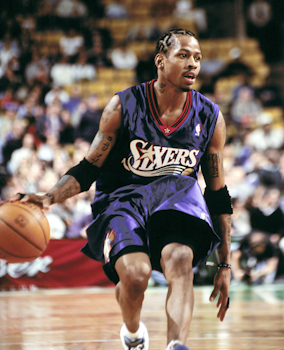
Allen Iverson often switched between both guard spots in his career.

A combo guard is a basketball player who combines the attributes of a point guard (1) and shooting guard (2) but does not necessarily fit the standard description of either position. In men's basketball, such guards are usually within the 6' 3" (1.91 m) and 6' 5" (1.96 m) height range. Most combo guards tend to be between point and shooting guards in terms of height, although some possess the height of a point or shooting guard specifically which affects how each plays.

Combo guards became prominent in the 1990s, when players such as Allen Iverson and Penny Hardaway were switched between playing point guard and shooting guard, depending on offensive and defensive situations. Combo guards use their ball-handling skills to bring the ball up the court and set up teammates, while also having the ability to shoot well. The best combo guards use their "in-between" height and athleticism to their own advantage: smaller point guards will use speed and agility to run past bigger players, while bigger shooting guards will shoot over the top of smaller players with their jump shots.

Historically, combo guards have been viewed as difficult for coaches to fit into an offensive system; however, combo guards have more recently become an important part of basketball, especially in the NBA. Dwyane Wade, a shooting guard with point-guard-like ball handling, led the Miami Heat to their first-ever NBA Championship in 2006, and won the Finals MVP award for the same championship series. In addition, the shift in the sport from a fundamental-driven style of play to a more scoring-oriented one means that the inferior passing ability of such guards is not viewed as a serious detriment. This shift is in part explained by hand-checking rules instituted by the NBA in 2007, which makes it a foul for a defender to use his hands to impede an offensive player. This allowed many smaller, weaker combo guards to use their speed to drive around stronger, taller players. In fact, many shorter young players (6' 2" or shorter) focus on developing their scoring abilities, whereas previously they would have to be proper point guards with the innate ability to pass to succeed in the professional leagues. For example, Allen Iverson is 6' 0" (1.83 m) tall, but given his shoot-first mentality, despite his exceptional ball-handling skills, he started playing as a shooting guard. He was rated as the fifth-greatest shooting guard of all time by ESPN in 2008. Other examples of combo guards are Jerry West, Jason Terry, Monta Ellis, Bradley Beal, Lou Williams, Marcus Smart, Victor Oladipo, Zach LaVine, Jamal Murray, Jrue Holiday, Joe Dumars, and Jeff Hornacek.

This is in contrast to "true" (or "pure") point guards such as Magic Johnson, John Stockton, Isiah Thomas, Steve Nash, Jason Kidd, Chris Paul, Rajon Rondo, John Wall, Kevin Johnson, and Ricky Rubio. These players exhibit a pass-first mentality, value assists and steals over points, and embrace the responsibility of playmaker rather than finisher. They conform to the perception that a point guard's duties are to direct the offense, distribute the ball, create scoring opportunities for others, and attempt the shot only if there are no open teammates to be found.

Some players, for example James Harden, Devin Booker, Manu Ginóbili, Tyreke Evans, Shaun Livingston, Jordan Clarkson, have the requisite size for a shooting guard (6' 5" or taller), but due to their at least above-average ball-handling and playmaking ability, are used as combo guards or even as swingmen.

In the Euroleague, the most notable examples are Vassilis Spanoulis, who has led his team to 3 Euroleague championships, and Sergio Llull, who has led Real Madrid to win 2 Euroleagues and nearly joined Houston Rockets on 2015 before signing renewal with his lifelong team. Other examples include American-born Macedonian player, Lester "Bo" McCalebb.

== See also ==
- Tweener
