= Aleksandar Radukić =

Serbian basketball player

Aleksandar Radukic
Personal information
- Born: 22 May 1991 (age 35) Nova Gradiška, SR Croatia, SFR Yugoslavia
- Listed height: 2.07 m (6 ft 9 in)

Career information
- Playing career: 2010–present
- Position: Power forward

Career history
- 2010–2011: Borac Nektar
- 2011–2012: Servitium Gradiška
- 2012–2015: Igokea
- 2015–2016: Mladost Mrkonjić Grad
- 2016–2017: Inter Bratislava
- 2017–2018: Bosna Royal
- 2018: Polpharma Starogard
- 2018–2019: CSU Craiova
- 2019–2020: MBK Banik Handlova
- 2020: Jászberényi
- 2020–2021: Borac Banja Luka
- 2021–2023: Nová Huť Ostrava
- 2023–2024: BC CSKA Sofia
- 2024–2026: Kumanovo

Aleksandar Radukić (Serbian Cyrillic: Александар Радукић, born 22 May 1991) is a Bosnian professional basketball player who last played for Kumanovo of the Macedonian First League.

== Playing career ==
Radukić signed for Igokea on 20 March 2012, having spent the first part of the 2011–12 season at Servitum Gradiška. He started playing professional basketball at Borac Nektar.

On 23 December 2020, Radukić signed for Borac Banja Luka. He left Borac in August 2021 to sign with Nová Huť Ostrava. In September 2023 he signed for BC CSKA Sofia.
