= PalaDozza =

Sporting arena in Bologna, Italy

Coordinates: 44.49988°N 11.33220°E

- Il Madison
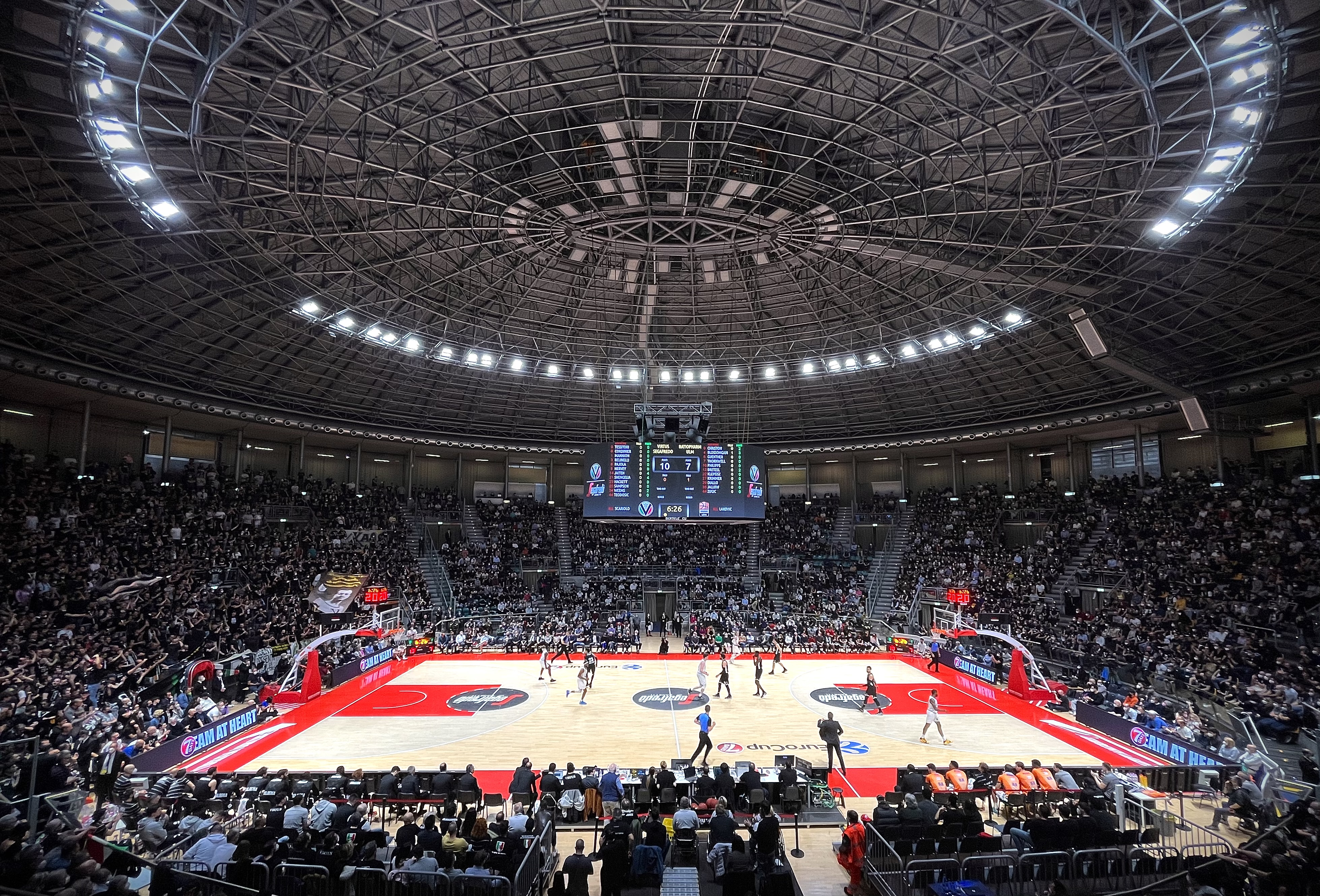
- Interactive map of PalaDozza
- Former names: PalaDozza
- Location: Bologna, Italy
- Capacity: Basketball: 5,570

Construction
- Opened: 1956

Tenants
- Virtus Bologna (1957–1996, 2017–2019); Fortitudo Bologna (1957–1996, 1999–2020, 2021–present); Volley Forlì Bologna 2002 (2012–2013)

PalaDozza is an indoor sporting arena located at Piazza Azzarita Manfredi 8, in Bologna, Italy. It was named after Giuseppe Dozza, the long-time communist mayor of Bologna, who served from 1945 to 1966. In Italy, the arena is frequently nicknamed Il Madison, after Madison Square Garden. The seating capacity of the arena for basketball games is 5,721 people. It is currently home to the Fortitudo Bologna professional basketball team.

== History ==
The arena was inaugurated in 1956. The arena hosted the FIBA European Champions Cup's 1965–66 season's Final Four, in which the Italian club Simmenthal Milano, won the competition. It was played in front of an 8,000 capacity crowd.

The Rolling Stones' first Italian concert was held here on 5 April 1967. During the band's sixth European tour.

Bruce Dickinson's first live show with Iron Maiden was performed here in October of 1981.

The venue hosted Group B in EuroBasket Women 2025.

== See also ==
- List of indoor arenas in Italy

Preceded by Two legged Final	FIBA European Champions Cup; Final Four venue 1966	Succeeded by Sports City of Real Madrid Pavilion; Madrid
