= 1965–66 FIBA European Champions Cup =

- League: FIBA European Champions Cup
- Sport: Basketball

Final Four
- Champions: (Italy) Simmenthal Milano (1st title)
- Runners-up: (Czechoslovakia) Slavia VŠ Praha

FIBA European Champions Cup seasons
- ← 1964–65 1966–67 →

The 1965–66 FIBA European Champions Cup was the ninth season of the European top-tier level professional basketball club competition FIBA European Champions Cup (now called EuroLeague). It was won by Simmenthal Milano, for the first time in its history, the first of the club's three EuroLeague championships.

Simmenthal defeated Slavia VŠ Praha, by a score of 77–72, in the final of the first ever Champions Cup Final Four held in the EuroLeague competition, with two venues used: a venue in Milan, and the Palazzo dello sport arena in Bologna, Italy. The Italian team, featuring future the Basketball Hall of Fame member Bill Bradley, defeated the favorites and former champions, CSKA Moscow, in the semifinal, by a score of 57–68.

== Competition system ==
26 teams. European national domestic league champions, plus the then current FIBA European Champions Cup title holders only, playing in a tournament system. The competition culminated in a Final Four.

== First round ==
Team 1	Agg.	Team 2	1st leg	2nd leg	3rd leg
Fenerbahçe (Turkey)	143–146	(Romania) Dinamo București	85–71	58–75	
Wiener (Austria)	139–161	(East Germany) Vorwärts Leipzig	75–82	64–79	
Gladsaxe Efterslægten (Denmark)	96–171	(Czechoslovakia) Slavia VŠ Praha	57–84	39–87	
Gießen 46ers (West Germany)	150–191	(Italy) Simmenthal Milano	77–88	73–103	
Etzella (Luxembourg)	98–162	(Bulgaria) CSKA Cherveno zname	51–72	47–90	
Collegians (Northern Ireland)	84–152	(France) Denain Voltaire	51–78	33–74	
KR (Iceland)	109–149	(Sweden) Alvik	48–60	61–89	
AEK (Greece)	153–150	(Poland) Wisła Kraków	72–71	81–79	
Wydad AC (Morocco)	193–191	(Portugal) Benfica	53–54	77–76	63-61
Aldershot Warriors (England)	144–213	(Belgium) Racing Mechelen	83–113	61–100	

*Series decided over a third game after having tied aggregate score after the two home-away games.

== Second round ==
Team 1	Agg.	Team 2	1st leg	2nd leg	3rd leg
Racing Mechelen (Belgium)	210–150	(Finland) Helsingin Kisa-Toverit	116–79	99–74	
Honvéd (Hungary)	143–182	(Czechoslovakia) Slavia VŠ Praha	62–100	81–82	
Vorwärts Leipzig (East Germany)	123–175	(Soviet Union) CSKA Moscow	66–87	57–88	
Wydad AC (Morocco)	172–238	(Greece) AEK	96–113	76–125	
Alvik (Sweden)	149–201	(Spain) Real Madrid	88–113	61–91	
Denain Voltaire (France)	126–139	(Bulgaria) CSKA Cherveno zname	61–53	65–86	
Hapoel Tel Aviv (Israel)	118–187	(Italy) Simmenthal Milano	65–80	53–87	
Dinamo București (Romania)	207–213*	(Socialist Federal Republic of Yugoslavia) Zadar	92–78	56–70	59-65

*Series decided over a third game after having tied aggregate score after the two home-away games.

== Quarterfinals group stage ==
For the first time in the competition history, the quarterfinals were played with a round-robin system, in which every Two Game series (TGS) constituted as one game for the record. A third decisive game was played if the aggregate score of the first two games was tied.

Key to colors for group standings
Top two places in each group advance to Semifinals

=== Group A ===
==== Games ====
Team 1	Agg.	Team 2	1st leg	2nd leg
Slavia VŠ Praha (Czechoslovakia)	146-151	(Spain) Real Madrid	83-71	63-80
Racing Mechelen (Belgium)	170-189	(Italy) Simmenthal Milano	104-94	66-95
Racing Mechelen (Belgium)	203-196	(Spain) Real Madrid	104-95	99-101
Simmenthal Milano (Italy)	155-159	(Czechoslovakia) Slavia VŠ Praha	96-77	59-82
Real Madrid (Spain)	147-159	(Italy) Simmenthal Milano	71-66	76-93
Racing Mechelen (Belgium)	180-185	(Czechoslovakia) Slavia VŠ Praha	104-91	76-94

==== Standings ====
	Team	Pld	Pts	W	L	PF	PA	PD
1.	(Czechoslovakia) Slavia VŠ Praha	3	5	2	1	490	486	+4
2.	(Italy) Simmenthal Milano	3	5	2	1	503	476	+27
3.	(Belgium) Racing Mechelen	3	4	1	2	553	570	-17
4.	(Spain) Real Madrid	3	4	1	2	494	508	-14

=== Group B ===
==== Games ====
Team 1	Agg.	Team 2	1st leg	2nd leg	3rd leg
CSKA Moscow (Soviet Union)	140-142	(Bulgaria) CSKA Cherveno zname	77-64	63-78	
Zadar (Socialist Federal Republic of Yugoslavia)	140-147	(Greece) AEK	69-71	71-76	
Zadar (Socialist Federal Republic of Yugoslavia)	210-217	(Bulgaria) CSKA Cherveno zname	79-53	58-84	73-80
AEK (Greece)	122-147	(Soviet Union) CSKA Moscow	74-66	48-81	
CSKA Cherveno zname (Bulgaria)	139-144	(Greece) AEK	94-69	45-75	
CSKA Moscow (Soviet Union)	166-133	(Socialist Federal Republic of Yugoslavia) Zadar	79-49	87-84	

==== Standings ====
	Team	Pld	Pts	W	L	PF	PA	PD
1.	(Soviet Union) CSKA Moscow	3	5	2	1	453	397	+56
2.	(Greece) AEK	3	5	2	1	413	426	-13
3.	(Bulgaria) CSKA Cherveno zname	3	5	2	1	498	494	+4
4.	(Socialist Federal Republic of Yugoslavia) Zadar	3	3	0	3	483	530	-47

== Final four ==
=== Semifinals ===
March 31, Milan

Team 1	Score	Team 2
Slavia VŠ Praha (Czechoslovakia)	103–73	(Greece) AEK

March 30, Palazzo dello sport, Bologna

Team 1	Score	Team 2
CSKA Moscow (Soviet Union)	57–68	(Italy) Simmenthal Milano

=== 3rd place game ===
April 1, Milan

Team 1	Score	Team 2
AEK (Greece)	62–85	(Soviet Union) CSKA Moscow

=== Final ===
April 1, Palazzo dello sport, Bologna

Team 1	Score	Team 2
Simmenthal Milano (Italy)	77–72	(Czechoslovakia) Slavia VŠ Praha

1965–66 FIBA European Champions Cup
Champions

Simmenthal Milano
1st Title

=== Final standings ===
	Team
	(Italy) Simmenthal Milano
2nd place, silver medalist(s)	(Czechoslovakia) Slavia VŠ Praha
3rd place, bronze medalist(s)	(Soviet Union) CSKA Moscow
	(Greece) AEK

== Awards ==
=== FIBA European Champions Cup Finals Top Scorer ===
- (Czechoslovakia) Jiří Zídek Sr. ( (Czechoslovakia) Slavia VŠ Praha)
