= Italian basketball clubs in international competitions =

Italian basketball clubs in European and worldwide competitions is the performance record of men's professional basketball clubs from Italy's top-tier level league, the Lega Basket Serie A, in international competitions.

== History ==
Italian men's professional basketball clubs have played in European-wide basketball competitions since 1958, when Simmenthal Milano took part in the FIBA European Champions Cup (now called EuroLeague). Simmenthal Milano was also the first Italian men's basketball club that won a European-wide competition trophy, the FIBA European Champions Cup (EuroLeague), in 1966, when the club beat Slavia VŠ Praha in the Finals that took place in Bologna, Italy. Over the next four decades, Italian basketball clubs dominated European basketball, claiming numerous titles across various competitions. To date, a total of 38 different Italian men's basketball clubs have competed in pan-European competitions.

== The finals ==
Season	Champion	Result	Runner-up	Date	Venue	
FIBA European Champions Cup & EuroLeague (1st tier)
1965–66	Simmenthal Milano (Italy)	77–72	(Czechoslovakia) Slavia VŠ Praha	01/04/1966	Palazzo dello sport, Bologna	
1966–67	Real Madrid (Spain)	91–83	(Italy) Simmenthal Milano	01/04/1967	Sports City of Real Madrid Pavilion, Madrid	
1969–70	Ignis Varese (Italy)	79–74	(Soviet Union) CSKA Moscow	09/04/1970	Sportska Dvorana Skenderija, Sarajevo	
1970–71	CSKA Moscow (Soviet Union)	67–53	(Italy) Ignis Varese	08/04/1971	Arena Deurne, Antwerp	
1971–72	Ignis Varese (Italy)	70–69	(Socialist Federal Republic of Yugoslavia) Jugoplastika	23/03/1972	Yad Eliyahu Arena, Tel Aviv	
1972–73	Ignis Varese (Italy)	71–66	(Soviet Union) CSKA Moscow	22/03/1973	Country Hall du Sart Tilman, Liège	
1973–74	Real Madrid (Spain)	84–82	(Italy) Ignis Varese	03/04/1974	Palais des Sports de Beaulieu, Nantes	
1974–75	Ignis Varese (Italy)	79–66	(Spain) Real Madrid	10/04/1975	Arena Deurne, Antwerp	
1975–76	Mobilgirgi Varese (Italy)	81–74	(Spain) Real Madrid	01/04/1976	Patinoire des Vernets, Geneva	
1976–77	Maccabi Elite Tel Aviv (Israel)	78–77	(Italy) Mobilgirgi Varese	07/04/1977	Hala Pionir, Belgrade	
1977–78	Real Madrid (Spain)	75–67	(Italy) Mobilgirgi Varese	06/04/1978	Olympiahalle, Munich	
1978–79	Bosna (Socialist Federal Republic of Yugoslavia)	96–93	(Italy) Emerson Varese	05/04/1979	Palais des Sports, Grenoble	
1980–81	Maccabi Elite Tel Aviv (Israel)	80–79	(Italy) Sinudyne Bologna	26/03/1981	Rhénus Sport, Strasbourg	
1981–82	Squibb Cantù (Italy)	86–80	(Israel) Maccabi Elite Tel Aviv	25/03/1982	Sporthalle, Cologne	
1982–83	Ford Cantù (Italy)	69–68	(Italy) Billy Milano	24/03/1983	Palais des Sports, Grenoble	
1983–84	Banco di Roma (Italy)	79–73	(Spain) FC Barcelona	29/03/1984	Patinoire des Vernets, Geneva	
1986–87	Tracer Milano (Italy)	71–69	(Israel) Maccabi Elite Tel Aviv	02/04/1987	Centre Intercommunal de Glace de Malley, Lausanne	
1987–88	Tracer Milano (Italy)	90–84	(Israel) Maccabi Elite Tel Aviv	07/04/1988	Flanders Expo, Ghent	
1992–93	Limoges CSP (France)	59–55	(Italy) Benetton Treviso	15/04/1993	Peace and Friendship Stadium, Piraeus	
1997–98	Kinder Bologna (Italy)	58–44	(Greece) AEK	23/04/1998	Palau Sant Jordi, Barcelona	
1998–99	Žalgiris (Lithuania)	82–74	(Italy) Kinder Bologna	22/04/1999	Olympiahalle, Munich	
2000–01	Kinder Bologna (Italy)	3–2 Play-off	(Spain) Tau Cerámica	17/04 to 10/05/2001	PalaMalaguti, Casalecchio di Reno	Pabellón Araba, Vitoria-Gasteiz
2001–02	Panathinaikos (Greece)	89–83	(Italy) Kinder Bologna	05/05/2002	PalaMalaguti, Casalecchio di Reno	
2002–03	FC Barcelona (Spain)	76–65	(Italy) Benetton Treviso	11/05/2003	Palau Sant Jordi, Barcelona	
2003–04	Maccabi Elite Tel Aviv (Israel)	118–74	(Italy) Skipper Bologna	01/05/2004	Nokia Arena, Tel Aviv	
FIBA Saporta Cup (2nd tier)
1966–67	Ignis Varese (Italy)	144–135 (two-leg)	(Israel) Maccabi Tel Aviv	07 & 13/04/1967	Palasport Lino Oldrini, Varese	Yad Eliyahu Arena, Tel Aviv
1969–70	Fides Napoli (Italy)	147–129 (two-leg)	(France) JA Vichy	15 & 26/04/1970	Salle des Ailes, Vichy	Palasport di Fuorigrotta, Naples
1970–71	Simmenthal Milano (Italy)	127–118 (two-leg)	(Soviet Union) Spartak Leningrad	30/03 & 07/04/1971	Armija Dvorets, Leningrad	PalaLido, Milan
1971–72	Simmenthal Milano (Italy)	74–70	(Socialist Federal Republic of Yugoslavia) Crvena zvezda	21/03/1972	Alexandreio Melathron, Thessaloniki	
1975–76	Cinzano Milano (Italy)	88–83	(France) ASPO Tours	17/03/1976	Palasport Parco Ruffini, Turin	
1976–77	Forst Cantù (Italy)	87–86	(Socialist Federal Republic of Yugoslavia) Radnički Belgrade	29/03/1977	Nuevo Palacio de los Deportes, Palma de Mallorca	
1977–78	Gabetti Cantù (Italy)	84–82	(Italy) Sinudyne Bologna	29/03/1978	PalaLido, Milan	
1978–79	Gabetti Cantù (Italy)	83–73	(Netherlands) EBBC	22/03/1979	SRC Veli Jože, Poreč	
1979–80	Emerson Varese (Italy)	90–88	(Italy) Gabetti Cantù	19/03/1980	Palasport di San Siro, Milan	
1980–81	Squibb Cantù (Italy)	86–82	(Spain) FC Barcelona	18/03/1981	Palaeur, Rome	
1982–83	Scavolini Pesaro (Italy)	111–99	(France) ASVEL	09/03/1983	Palacio Municipal de Deportes, Palma de Mallorca	
1983–84	Real Madrid (Spain)	82–81	(Italy) Simac Milano	14/03/1983	Stedelijk Sportcentrum, Ostend	
1985–86	FC Barcelona (Spain)	101–86	(Italy) Scavolini Pesaro	18/03/1986	PalaMaggiò, Caserta	
1986–87	Cibona (Socialist Federal Republic of Yugoslavia)	89–74	(Italy) Scavolini Pesaro	17/03/1987	Dvorana SPC Vojvodina, Novi Sad	
1988–89	Real Madrid (Spain)	117–113	(Italy) Snaidero Caserta	14/03/1989	Peace and Friendship Stadium, Piraeus	
1989–90	Knorr Bologna (Italy)	79–74	(Spain) Real Madrid	13/03/1990	PalaGiglio, Florence	
1994–95	Benetton Treviso (Italy)	94–86	(Spain) Taugrés	14/03/1995	Abdi İpekçi Arena, Istanbul	
1996–97	Real Madrid Teka (Spain)	78–64	(Italy) Mash Jeans Verona	15/04/1997	Eleftheria Indoor Hall, Nicosia	
1997–98	Žalgiris (Lithuania)	82–67	(Italy) Stefanel Milano	14/04/1998	Hala Pionir, Belgrade	
1998–99	Benetton Treviso (Italy)	64–60	(Spain) Pamesa Valencia	14/04/1999	Pabellón Príncipe Felipe, Zaragoza	
1999–00	AEK (Greece)	83–76	(Italy) Kinder Bologna	11/04/2000	Centre Intercommunal de Glace de Malley, Lausanne	
2001–02	Montepaschi Siena (Italy)	81–71	(Spain) Pamesa Valencia	30/04/2002	Palais des Sports de Gerland, Lyon	
FIBA Korać Cup (3rd tier)
1973	Birra Forst Cantù (Italy)	191–169 (two-leg)	(Belgium) Maes Pils	20 & 27/03/1973	Palazzetto dello Sport Parini, Cantù	Sporthal Winketkaai, Mechelen
1973–74	Birra Forst Cantù (Italy)	174–154 (two-leg)	(Socialist Federal Republic of Yugoslavia) Partizan	04 & 11/04/1974	Palazzetto dello Sport Parini, Cantù	Hala sportova, Belgrade
1974–75	Birra Forst Cantù (Italy)	181–154 (two-leg)	(Spain) CF Barcelona	18 & 25/03/1975	Palau Blaugrana, Barcelona	Palasport Pianella, Cucciago
1975–76	Jugoplastika (Socialist Federal Republic of Yugoslavia)	179–166 (two-leg)	(Italy) Chinamartini Torino	16 & 23/03/1976	Dvorana Gripe, Split	PalaRuffini, Turin
1976–77	Jugoplastika (Socialist Federal Republic of Yugoslavia)	87–84	(Italy) Alco Bologna	05/04/1977	Palasport della Fiera, Genoa	
1978–79	Partizan (Socialist Federal Republic of Yugoslavia)	108–98	(Italy) Arrigoni Rieti	20/03/1979	Hala Pionir, Belgrade	
1979–80	Arrigoni Rieti (Italy)	76–71	(Socialist Federal Republic of Yugoslavia) Cibona	26/03/1980	Country Hall du Sart Tilman, Liège	
1980–81	Joventut Freixenet (Spain)	105–104	(Italy) Carrera Venezia	19/03/1981	Palau Blaugrana, Barcelona	
1984–85	Simac Milano (Italy)	91–76	(Italy) Ciaocrem Varese	21/03/1985	Palais du Midi, Brussels	
1985–86	Banco di Roma (Italy)	157–150 (two-leg)	(Italy) Mobilgirgi Caserta	20 & 27/03/1986	PalaMaggiò, Caserta	Palaeur, Rome
1988–89	Partizan (Socialist Federal Republic of Yugoslavia)	177–171 (two-leg)	(Italy) Wiwa Vismara Cantù	16 & 22/03/1989	Palasport Pianella, Cucciago	Hala sportova, Belgrade
1989–90	Ram Joventut (Spain)	195–184 (two-leg)	(Italy) Scavolini Pesaro	21 & 28/03/1990	Palasport Comunale, Pesaro	Pavelló del Joventut, Badalona
1990–91	Shampoo Clear Cantù (Italy)	168–164 (two-leg)	(Spain) Real Madrid	20 & 27/03/1991	Palacio de Deportes..., Madrid	Palasport Pianella, Cucciago
1991–92	Il Messaggero Roma (Italy)	193–180 (two-leg)	(Italy) Scavolini Pesaro	11 & 18/03/1992	Palaeur, Rome	Palasport Comunale, Pesaro
1992–93	Philips Milano (Italy)	201–181 (two-leg)	(Italy) Virtus Roma	09 & 18/03/1993	Palaeur, Rome	Forum di Milanofiori, Assago
1993–94	PAOK Bravo (Greece)	175–156 (two-leg)	(Italy) Stefanel Trieste	09 & 16/03/1994	Alexandreio Melathron, Thessaloniki	PalaTrieste, Trieste
1994–95	Alba Berlin (Germany)	172–166 (two-leg)	(Italy) Stefanel Milano	08 & 15/03/1995	Forum di Milanofiori, Assago	Deutschlandhalle, Berlin
1995–96	Efes Pilsen (Turkey)	146–145 (two-leg)	(Italy) Stefanel Milano	06 & 13/03/1996	Abdi İpekçi Arena, Istanbul	Forum di Milanofiori, Assago
1997–98	Mash Jeans Verona (Italy)	141–138 (two-leg)	(Federal Republic of Yugoslavia) Crvena zvezda	25/03 & 01/04/1998	PalaOlimpia, Verona	Hala Pionir, Belgrade
FIBA EuroChallenge (3rd tier)
2008–09	Virtus BolognaFiere (Italy)	77–75	(France) Cholet Basket	26/04/2009	Futurshow Station, Casalecchio di Reno	
2013–14	Grissin Bon Reggio Emilia (Italy)	79–65	(Russia) Triumph Lyubertsy	27/04/2014	PalaDozza, Bologna	
Basketball Champions League (3rd tier)
2018–19	Segafredo Virtus Bologna (Italy)	73–61	(Spain) Iberostar Tenerife	05/05/2019	Sportpaleis, Antwerp	
FIBA Europe Cup (4th tier)
2015–16	Fraport Skyliners (Germany)	66–62	(Italy) Openjobmetis Varese	01/05/2016	Le Colisée, Chalon-sur-Saône	
2017–18	Umana Reyer Venezia (Italy)	158–148 (two-leg)	(Italy) Sidigas Avellino	25/04 & 02/05/2018	Palasport Del Mauro, Avellino	Palasport Giuseppe Taliercio, Venice

== Italian clubs in EuroLeague (1st-tier level) ==
=== Season to season ===
Year	Team	_______ Earlier stage _______	________ Last 24 to 32 ________	________ Last 12 to 16 ________	_________ Last 6 to 8 _________	_________ Semifinals _________	____________ Final ____________
1958	Simmenthal Milano		(Netherlands) The Wolves Amsterdam	1st of 3 teams	(Hungary) Honvéd		
1958–59	Simmenthal Milano			(United Arab Republic) Al-Gezira			
1959–60
1960–61	Idrolitina Bologna		(Switzerland) Urania Genève Sport	(Romania) CCA București			
1961–62	Ignis Varese		(Portugal) Benfica	(Spain) Real Madrid			
1962–63	Simmenthal Milano		(Morocco) Alliance Sports Casablanca	(West Germany) Alemannia Aachen	(Soviet Union) Dinamo Tbilisi		
1963–64	Simmenthal Milano			(Belgium) Antwerpse	(Finland) Helsingin Kisa-Toverit	(Spain) Real Madrid	
1964–65	Ignis Varese		(Morocco) ASFAR	(Hungary) Honvéd	(Czechoslovakia) Spartak ZJŠ Brno	(Soviet Union) CSKA Moscow	
1965–66	Simmenthal Milano		(West Germany) Gießen 46ers	(Israel) Hapoel Tel Aviv	2nd of 4 teams	(Soviet Union) CSKA Moscow	(Czechoslovakia) Slavia VŠ Praha
1966–67	Simmenthal Milano		(Iceland) KR	(Finland) Torpan Pojat	1st of 4 teams	(Czechoslovakia) Slavia VŠ Praha	(Spain) Real Madrid
1967–68	Simmenthal Milano			(Austria) Engelmann Wien	2nd of 4 teams	(Czechoslovakia) Spartak ZJŠ Brno	
1968–69	Oransoda Cantù		(Luxembourg) Black Star Mersch	(Albania) Partizani Tirana	3rd of 4 teams		
1969–70	Ignis Varese			(Finland) Tapion Honka	2nd of 4 teams	(Spain) Real Madrid	(Soviet Union) CSKA Moscow
1970–71	Ignis Varese			(West Germany) TuS 04 Leverkusen	1st of 4 teams	(Spain) Real Madrid	(Soviet Union) CSKA Moscow
1971–72	Ignis Varese				1st of 4 teams	(Greece) Panathinaikos	(Socialist Federal Republic of Yugoslavia) Jugoplastika
1972–73	Simmenthal Milano		(West Germany) TuS 04 Leverkusen	(Austria) Wienerberger	1st of 4 teams	(Italy) Ignis Varese	
1972–73	Ignis Varese				2nd of 4 teams	(Italy) Simmenthal Milano	(Soviet Union) CSKA Moscow
1973–74	Ignis Varese				1st of 4 teams	(Socialist Federal Republic of Yugoslavia) Radnički Belgrade	(Spain) Real Madrid
1974–75	Ignis Varese			1st of 6 teams	Bye	(France) Berck	(Spain) Real Madrid
1975–76	Birra Forst Cantù		(Luxembourg) T71 Dudelange	2nd of 6 teams	Bye	(Italy) Mobilgirgi Varese	
1975–76	Mobilgirgi Varese			1st of 6 teams	Bye	(Italy) Birra Forst Cantù	(Spain) Real Madrid
1976–77	Sinudyne Bologna		2nd of 4 teams				
1976–77	Mobilgirgi Varese		1st of 4 teams	Bye	1st of 6 teams	Bye	(Israel) Maccabi Elite Tel Aviv
1977–78	Mobilgirgi Varese		1st of 3 teams	Bye	2nd of 6 teams	Bye	(Spain) Real Madrid
1978–79	Emerson Varese		1st of 3 teams	Bye	1st of 6 teams	Bye	(Socialist Federal Republic of Yugoslavia) Bosna
1979–80	Sinudyne Bologna		1st of 3 teams	Bye	4th of 6 teams		
1980–81	Sinudyne Bologna		1st of 4 teams	Bye	1st of 6 teams	Bye	(Israel) Maccabi Elite Tel Aviv
1981–82	Squibb Cantù		1st of 4 teams	Bye	2nd of 6 teams	Bye	(Israel) Maccabi Elite Tel Aviv
1982–83	Billy Milano		(Turkey) Eczacıbaşı	(France) Moderne	2nd of 6 teams	Bye	(Italy) Ford Cantù
1982–83	Ford Cantù		(Luxembourg) T71 Dudelange	(Switzerland) Fribourg Olympic	1st of 6 teams	Bye	(Italy) Billy Milano
1983–84	Banco di Roma		(Luxembourg) T71 Dudelange	(Albania) Partizani Tirana	2nd of 6 teams	Bye	(Spain) FC Barcelona
1983–84	Jollycolombani Cantù		(Switzerland) Nyon	(Belgium) Sunair Oostende	3rd of 6 teams		
1984–85	Granarolo Bologna		(Hungary) Honvéd	(Greece) Panathinaikos	6th of 6 teams		
1984–85	Banco di Roma		(Denmark) SISU	(Turkey) Efes Pilsen	5th of 6 teams		
1985–86	Simac Milano		(Luxembourg) T71 Dudelange	(Finland) NMKY Helsinki	3rd of 6 teams		
1986–87	Tracer Milano		(Scotland) Murray Edinburgh	(Greece) Aris	1st of 6 teams	Bye	(Israel) Maccabi Elite Tel Aviv
1987–88	Tracer Milano			(Bulgaria) Balkan Botevgrad	3rd of 8 teams	(Greece) Aris	(Israel) Maccabi Elite Tel Aviv
1988–89	Scavolini Pesaro			(Albania) Partizani Tirana	6th of 8 teams		
1989–90	Philips Milano		(Portugal) Benfica	(England) Bracknell Tigers	5th of 8 teams		
1990–91	Scavolini Pesaro			(Hungary) ZTE-Heraklith	3rd of 8 teams	(Socialist Federal Republic of Yugoslavia) Pop 84	(Israel) Maccabi Elite Tel Aviv (4th)
1991–92	Phonola Caserta			8th of 8 teams			
1991–92	Philips Milano		(Finland) KTP	3rd of 8 teams	(Spain) Banca Catalana FC Barcelona	(Federal Republic of Yugoslavia) Partizan	(Spain) Estudiantes Caja Postal
1991–92	Knorr Bologna		(Cyprus) Pezoporikos Larnaca	1st of 8 teams	(Federal Republic of Yugoslavia) Partizan		
1992–93	Benetton Treviso			2nd of 8 teams	(Italy) Scavolini Pesaro	(Greece) PAOK	(France) Limoges CSP
1992–93	Scavolini Pesaro		(Poland) Śląsk Wrocław	3rd of 8 teams	(Italy) Benetton Treviso		
1992–93	Knorr Bologna		(Ukraine) Budivelnyk	4th of 8 teams	(Spain) Real Madrid Teka		
1993–94	Buckler Beer Bologna			4th of 8 teams	(Greece) Olympiacos		
1993–94	Benetton Treviso		(Czech Republic) USK Praha	6th of 8 teams			
1993–94	Shampoo Clear Cantù		(Switzerland) Fidefinanz Bellinzona	8th of 8 teams			
1994–95	Buckler Beer Bologna		(England) Thames Valley Tigers	4th of 8 teams	(Greece) Panathinaikos		
1994–95	Scavolini Pesaro		(Lithuania) Žalgiris	4th of 8 teams	(France) Limoges CSP		
1995–96	Buckler Beer Bologna		(Estonia) Kalev	5th of 8 teams			
1995–96	Benetton Treviso		(Slovakia) Baník Cígeľ Prievidza	2nd of 8 teams	(Greece) Panathinaikos		
1996–97	Stefanel Milano	1st of 6 teams	1st of 6 teams	(Italy) Kinder Bologna	(Slovenia) Smelt Olimpija		
1996–97	Teamsystem Bologna	1st of 6 teams	1st of 6 teams	(Spain) Caja San Fernando	(Spain) Banca Catalana FC Barcelona		
1996–97	Kinder Bologna	3rd of 6 teams	4th of 6 teams	(Italy) Stefanel Milano			
1997–98	Benetton Treviso	1st of 6 teams	1st of 6 teams	(Slovenia) Union Olimpija	(Turkey) Efes Pilsen	(Greece) AEK	(Federal Republic of Yugoslavia) Partizan
1997–98	Teamsystem Bologna	2nd of 6 teams	2nd of 6 teams	(Israel) Maccabi Elite Tel Aviv	(Italy) Kinder Bologna		
1997–98	Kinder Bologna	1st of 6 teams	1st of 6 teams	(Spain) Estudiantes	(Italy) Teamsystem Bologna	(Federal Republic of Yugoslavia) Partizan	(Greece) AEK
1998–99	Kinder Bologna	2nd of 6 teams	2nd of 6 teams	(Israel) Maccabi Elite Tel Aviv	(France) Pau-Orthez	(Italy) Teamsystem Bologna	(Lithuania) Žalgiris
1998–99	Teamsystem Bologna	4th of 6 teams	4th of 6 teams	(Greece) Panathinaikos	(Spain) Real Madrid Teka	(Italy) Kinder Bologna	(Greece) Olympiacos (4th)
1998–99	Varese Roosters	5th of 6 teams	4th of 6 teams	(Greece) Olympiacos			
1999–00	Varese Roosters	5th of 6 teams	5th of 6 teams				
1999–00	Benetton Treviso	3rd of 6 teams	3rd of 6 teams	(Italy) Paf Wennington Bologna			
1999–00	Paf Wennington Bologna	3rd of 6 teams	2nd of 6 teams	(Italy) Benetton Treviso	(Israel) Maccabi Elite Tel Aviv		
2000–01	Scavolini Pesaro		5th of 10 teams	(Turkey) Ülker	(Israel) Maccabi Elite Tel Aviv		
2000–01	Montepaschi Siena		9th of 10 teams				
2000–01	Paf Wennington Bologna		1st of 6 teams	(Croatia) Cibona	(Spain) Real Madrid Teka	(Italy) Kinder Bologna	
2000–01	Benetton Treviso		4th of 6 teams	(Spain) FC Barcelona	(Greece) AEK		
2000–01	Kinder Bologna		1st of 6 teams	(Spain) Adecco Estudiantes	(Slovenia) Union Olimpija	(Italy) Paf Wennington Bologna	(Spain) Tau Cerámica
2000–01	Müller Verona		4th of 6 teams	(Greece) Olympiacos			
2001–02	Kinder Bologna		1st of 8 teams	1st of 4 teams	Bye	(Italy) Benetton Treviso	(Greece) Panathinaikos
2001–02	Skipper Bologna		3rd of 8 teams	3rd of 4 teams			
2001–02	Scavolini Pesaro		4th of 8 teams	4th of 4 teams			
2001–02	Benetton Treviso		1st of 8 teams	1st of 4 teams	Bye	(Italy) Kinder Bologna	
2002–03	Benetton Treviso		1st of 8 teams	1st of 4 teams	Bye	(Italy) Montepaschi Siena	(Spain) FC Barcelona
2002–03	Skipper Bologna		4th of 8 teams	2nd of 4 teams			
2002–03	Virtus Bologna		4th of 8 teams	4th of 4 teams			
2002–03	Montepaschi Siena		6th of 8 teams	1st of 4 teams	Bye	(Italy) Benetton Treviso	(Russia) CSKA Moscow
2003–04	Benetton Treviso		2nd of 8 teams	2nd of 4 teams			
2003–04	Skipper Bologna		3rd of 8 teams	1st of 4 teams	Bye	(Italy) Montepaschi Siena	(Israel) Maccabi Elite Tel Aviv
2003–04	Lottomatica Roma		8th of 8 teams				
2003–04	Montepaschi Siena		4th of 8 teams	1st of 4 teams	Bye	(Italy) Skipper Bologna	(Russia) CSKA Moscow (4th)
2004–05	Montepaschi Siena		5th of 8 teams	3rd of 4 teams			
2004–05	Climamio Bologna		1st of 8 teams	3rd of 4 teams			
2004–05	Benetton Treviso		3rd of 8 teams	1st of 4 teams	(Spain) Tau Cerámica		
2004–05	Scavolini Pesaro		6th of 8 teams	2nd of 4 teams	(Israel) Maccabi Elite Tel Aviv		
2005–06	Climamio Bologna		2nd of 8 teams	3rd of 4 teams			
2005–06	Armani Jeans Milano		8th of 8 teams				
2005–06	Benetton Treviso		4th of 8 teams	3rd of 4 teams			
2005–06	Montepaschi Siena		6th of 8 teams				
2006–07	Benetton Treviso		3rd of 8 teams	3rd of 4 teams			
2006–07	Climamio Bologna		6th of 8 teams				
2006–07	Eldo Napoli		6th of 8 teams				
2006–07	Lottomatica Roma		5th of 8 teams	3rd of 4 teams			
2007–08	Montepaschi Siena		2nd of 8 teams	1st of 4 teams	(Turkey) Fenerbahçe Ülker	(Israel) Maccabi Elite Tel Aviv	(Spain) Tau Cerámica
2007–08	VidiVici Bologna		8th of 8 teams				
2007–08	Armani Jeans Milano		7th of 8 teams				
2007–08	Lottomatica Roma		6th of 8 teams	4th of 4 teams			
2008–09	Montepaschi Siena		2nd of 6 teams	2nd of 4 teams	(Greece) Panathinaikos		
2008–09	Lottomatica Roma		2nd of 6 teams	4th of 4 teams			
2008–09	Air Avellino		5th of 6 teams				
2008–09	Armani Jeans Milano		3rd of 6 teams	3rd of 4 teams			
2009–10	Montepaschi Siena		2nd of 6 teams	3rd of 4 teams			
2009–10	Armani Jeans Milano		5th of 6 teams				
2009–10	Lottomatica Roma		5th of 6 teams				
2009–10	Benetton Treviso	(France) Entente Orléanaise Loiret					
2010–11	Montepaschi Siena		1st of 6 teams	2nd of 4 teams	(Greece) Olympiacos	(Greece) Panathinaikos	(Spain) Real Madrid
2010–11	Armani Jeans Milano		5th of 6 teams				
2010–11	Lottomatica Roma		4th of 6 teams	3rd of 4 teams			
2011–12	Montepaschi Siena		2nd of 6 teams	1st of 4 teams	(Greece) Olympiacos		
2011–12	Bennet Cantù		3rd of 6 teams	3rd of 4 teams			
2011–12	EA7 Emporio Armani Milano		4th of 6 teams	3rd of 4 teams			
2012–13	Montepaschi Siena		3rd of 6 teams	6th of 8 teams			
2012–13	EA7 Emporio Armani Milano		5th of 6 teams				
2012–13	Mapooro Cantù	(France) Le Mans Sarthe	6th of 6 teams				
2013–14	Montepaschi Siena		5th of 6 teams				
2013–14	EA7 Emporio Armani Milano		2nd of 6 teams	2nd of 8 teams	(Israel) Maccabi Electra Tel Aviv		
2014–15	EA7 Emporio Armani Milano		4th of 6 teams	6th of 8 teams			
2014–15	Banco di Sardegna Sassari		6th of 6 teams				
2015–16	Banco di Sardegna Sassari		6th of 6 teams				
2015–16	EA7 Emporio Armani Milano		6th of 6 teams				
2016–17	EA7 Emporio Armani Milano			16th of 16 teams			
2017–18	AX Armani Exchange Olimpia Milan			15th of 16 teams			
2018–19	AX Armani Exchange Olimpia Milan			12th of 16 teams			

== Italian clubs in FIBA Saporta Cup (2nd-tier level) ==
=== Season to season ===
Year	Team	_______ Earlier stage _______	___________ Last 48 ___________	________ Last 24 to 32 ________	________ Last 12 to 16 ________	_________ Last 6 to 8 _________	_________ Semifinals _________	____________ Final ____________
1966–67	Ignis Varese			Bye	(France) Nantes	(Socialist Federal Republic of Yugoslavia) Partizan	(Czechoslovakia) Spartak ZJŠ Brno	(Israel) Maccabi Tel Aviv
1967–68	All'Onestà Milano			(Romania) Dinamo București				
1967–68	Ignis Varese					(France) ASVEL	(Greece) AEK	
1968–69	Fides Napoli				(Romania) Steaua București	(Greece) Panathinaikos		
1969–70	Fides Napoli			(Portugal) Benfica	(Israel) Maccabi Tel Aviv	(Socialist Federal Republic of Yugoslavia) Lokomotiva	(Soviet Union) Dinamo Tbilisi	(France) JA Vichy
1970–71	Simmenthal Milano			(Morocco) MEC	(Belgium) Racing Bell Mechelen	(Israel) Hapoel Tel Aviv	(Italy) Fides Napoli	(Soviet Union) Spartak Leningrad
1970–71	Fides Napoli					(Poland) Legia Warszawa	(Italy) Simmenthal Milano	
1971–72	Fides Napoli			(West Germany) USC Mainz	(Czechoslovakia) Spartak ZJŠ Brno	1st of 3 teams	(Italy) Simmenthal Milano	
1971–72	Simmenthal Milano					2nd of 3 teams	(Italy) Fides Napoli	(Socialist Federal Republic of Yugoslavia) Crvena zvezda
1972–73	Mobilquatro Milano			(Switzerland) Union Neuchâtel	(Poland) Śląsk Wrocław	2nd of 3 teams	(Socialist Federal Republic of Yugoslavia) Jugoplastika	
1973–74	Saclà Asti			(Switzerland) Pregassona	(Turkey) TED Ankara Kolejliler	2nd of 3 teams	(Czechoslovakia) Spartak ZJŠ Brno	
1974–75	Sinudyne Bologna				(Israel) Maccabi Ramat Gan	3rd of 4 teams		
1975–76	Cinzano Milano				(Sweden) Solna IF	2nd of 4 teams	(Socialist Federal Republic of Yugoslavia) Rabotnički	(France) ASPO Tours
1976–77	Forst Cantù				(Sweden) Högsbo	1st of 4 teams	(Italy) Cinzano Milano	(Socialist Federal Republic of Yugoslavia) Radnički Belgrade
1976–77	Cinzano Milano					2nd of 4 teams	(Italy) Forst Cantù	
1977–78	Sinudyne Bologna				(Greece) Olympiacos	1st of 4 teams	(France) Caen	(Italy) Gabetti Cantù
1977–78	Gabetti Cantù					1st of 4 teams	(Spain) FC Barcelona	(Italy) Sinudyne Bologna
1978–79	Sinudyne Bologna					2nd of 4 teams	(Netherlands) EBBC	
1978–79	Gabetti Cantù					2nd of 4 teams	(Spain) FC Barcelona	(Netherlands) EBBC
1979–80	Emerson Varese			Sporting Clube de Portugal	(Finland) Chatby KTP	1st of 4 teams	(Netherlands) Parker Leiden	(Italy) Gabetti Cantù
1979–80	Gabetti Cantù					1st of 4 teams	(Spain) FC Barcelona	(Italy) Emerson Varese
1980–81	Squibb Cantù					1st of 4 teams	(Italy) Turisanda Varese	(Spain) FC Barcelona
1980–81	Turisanda Varese					2nd of 4 teams	(Italy) Squibb Cantù	
1981–82	Sinudyne Bologna					2nd of 4 teams	(Spain) Real Madrid	
1982–83	Scavolini Pesaro				(Switzerland) FV Lugano	1st of 4 teams	(Socialist Federal Republic of Yugoslavia) ZZI Olimpija	(France) ASVEL
1983–84	Simac Milano				(Switzerland) Vevey	1st of 4 teams	(Italy) Scavolini Pesaro	(Spain) Real Madrid
1983–84	Scavolini Pesaro					2nd of 4 teams	(Italy) Simac Milano	
1984–85	Intesit Caserta					3rd of 4 teams		
1985–86	Scavolini Pesaro			(Belgium) Opel Merksem	(Sweden) Täby	2nd of 4 teams	(Spain) Ron Negrita Joventut	(Spain) FC Barcelona
1986–87	Scavolini Pesaro					2nd of 4 teams	(Soviet Union) CSKA Moscow	(Socialist Federal Republic of Yugoslavia) Cibona
1987–88	Scavolini Pesaro				(Cyprus) ENAD Ayiou Dometiou	2nd of 4 teams	(France) Limoges CSP	
1988–89	Snaidero Caserta				(Bulgaria) CSKA Sofia	2nd of 4 teams	(Soviet Union) Žalgiris	(Spain) Real Madrid
1989–90	Knorr Bologna				(Turkey) Çukurova Üniversitesi	1st of 4 teams	(Greece) PAOK	(Spain) Real Madrid
1990–91	Knorr Bologna				(Romania) Balanța Sibiu	3rd of 4 teams		
1991–92	Glaxo Verona		(Turkey) Tofaş	(Sweden) Scania Södertälje	1st of 6 teams	Bye	(Spain) Real Madrid Asegurator	
1992–93	Stefanel Trieste		(Bulgaria) Slavia Sofia	(Israel) Hapoel Galil Elyon				
1993–94	Olitalia Siena		(Czech Republic) Bioveta COOP Banka Brno	(Turkey) Tofaş				
1994–95	Benetton Treviso		(Bulgaria) Plama Pleven	(Cyprus) Pezoporikos Larnaca	2nd of 6 teams	Bye	(France) Olympique Antibes	(Spain) Taugrés
1995–96	illycaffè Trieste		(Sweden) New Wave Sharks					
1996–97	Mash Jeans Verona		1st of 6 teams	(Federal Republic of Yugoslavia) BFC Beočin	(Ukraine) Budivelnyk	(Portugal) Porto	(Greece) Iraklis Thessaloniki	(Spain) Real Madrid Teka
1996–97	Scavolini Pesaro		5th of 6 teams					
1997–98	Stefanel Milano		1st of 6 teams	(Slovenia) Kovinotehna Savinjska Polzela	(Belgium) Sunair Oostende	(France) ASVEL	(Greece) Panathinaikos	(Lithuania) Žalgiris
1997–98	Polti Cantù		1st of 6 teams	(Slovakia) Slovakofarma Pezinok	(Federal Republic of Yugoslavia) Beobanka			
1998–99	Benetton Treviso		1st of 6 teams	(Poland) Mazowzanka	(Belgium) Spirou	(Federal Republic of Yugoslavia) Partizan	(Federal Republic of Yugoslavia) Budućnost	(Spain) Pamesa Valencia
1998–99	Sony Milano		1st of 6 teams	(Slovakia) Slovakofarma Pezinok				
1999–00	Kinder Bologna		1st of 6 teams	(Germany) Telekom Baskets Bonn	(Germany) Skyliners Frankfurt	(Spain) Pamesa Valencia	(Lithuania) Lietuvos rytas	(Greece) AEK
1999–00	Adecco Milano		4th of 6 teams	(Slovenia) Krka	(Poland) Zepter Śląsk Idea Wrocław			
2000–01	Lineltex Andrea Costa Imola			6th of 6 teams				
2001–02	Montepaschi Siena			1st of 6 teams	(France) SIG	(Russia) UNICS	(Israel) Hapoel Jerusalem	(Spain) Pamesa Valencia
2001–02	Snaidero Udine			2nd of 6 teams	(Israel) Hapoel Jerusalem			

== Italian clubs in FIBA Korać Cup (3rd-tier level) ==
=== Season to season ===
Year	Team	_______ Earlier stage _______	________ Last 64 to 48 ________	________ Last 24 to 32 ________	________ Last 12 to 16 ________	_________ Last 6 to 8 _________	_________ Semifinals _________	____________ Final ____________
1972
1973	Birra Forst Cantù				1st of 3 teams	Bye	(Spain) Filomatic Picadero	(Belgium) Maes Pils
1973–74	Innocenti Milano		(Socialist Federal Republic of Yugoslavia) Borac Čačak	(Austria) Union Garant Ehgartner	3rd of 3 teams			
1973–74	Birra Forst Cantù				1st of 3 teams	Bye	(France) ASVEL	(Socialist Federal Republic of Yugoslavia) Partizan
1973–74	Snaidero Udine		(West Germany) TuS 04 Leverkusen	(Netherlands) Raak Punch	2nd of 3 teams			
1973–74	Mobilquattro Milano			(West Germany) 1.FC Bamberg	3rd of 3 teams			
1974–75	Innocenti Milano			(France) Denain Voltaire	2nd of 4 teams			
1974–75	Birra Forst Cantù			(West Germany) Wolfenbüttel	1st of 4 teams †	Bye	(Socialist Federal Republic of Yugoslavia) Partizan	(Spain) FC Barcelona
1974–75	Brina Rieti		(West Germany) USC München	(Belgium) Standard Liège	1st of 4 teams	Bye	(Spain) FC Barcelona	
1974–75	IBP Stella Azzurra			(Israel) Hapoel Gvat/Yagur	3rd of 4 teams			
1975–76	Sinudyne Bologna			(Austria) Maximarkt Wels	1st of 4 teams	Bye	(Socialist Federal Republic of Yugoslavia) Jugoplastika	
1975–76	Mobilquattro Milano			(Israel) Hapoel Ramat Gan	4th of 4 teams			
1975–76	Chinamartini Torino			(France) Caen	1st of 4 teams	Bye	(Spain) Juventud Schweppes	(Socialist Federal Republic of Yugoslavia) Jugoplastika
1975–76	Brina Rieti				3rd of 4 teams			
1976–77	IBP Stella Azzurra			(Greece) Aris	1st of 3 teams	Bye	(Socialist Federal Republic of Yugoslavia) Jugoplastika	
1976–77	Alco Bologna		(Portugal) Sangalhos	(Greece) Panionios	1st of 3 teams	Bye	(France) Berck	(Socialist Federal Republic of Yugoslavia) Jugoplastika
1976–77	Canon Venezia		(Turkey) Karşıyaka	(France) ESM Challans	2nd of 3 teams			
1976–77	Snaidero Udine		(Austria) Maximarkt Wels	(Bulgaria) Balkan Botevgrad	3rd of 3 teams			
1977–78	Cinzano Milano			(Spain) Centro Natación Helios	1st of 4 teams	Bye	(Socialist Federal Republic of Yugoslavia) Bosna	
1977–78	Xerox Milano			(Austria) Maximarkt Wels	3rd of 4 teams			
1977–78	Emerson Genova			(West Germany) Wolfenbüttel	3rd of 4 teams			
1977–78	Scavolini Pesaro			(Greece) Panellinios	3rd of 4 teams			
1978–79	Arrigoni Rieti				1st of 4 teams	Bye	(Spain) Cotonificio	(Socialist Federal Republic of Yugoslavia) Partizan
1978–79	Pagnossin Gorizia			(Belgium) Verviers-Pepinster	2nd of 4 teams			
1979–80	Arrigoni Rieti				1st of 4 teams	Bye	(Socialist Federal Republic of Yugoslavia) Jugoplastika	(Socialist Federal Republic of Yugoslavia) Cibona
1979–80	Antonini Siena		(Belgium) Verviers-Pepinster	(West Germany) BG Bayreuth	2nd of 4 teams			
1979–80	Jollycolombani Forlì		(Israel) Hapoel Haifa	(France) Orthez				
1979–80	Superga Mestre			(England) Team Fiat Stars	2nd of 4 teams			
1980–81	Ferrarelle Rieti				2nd of 4 teams			
1980–81	Carrera Venezia			(Israel) Hapoel Haifa	1st of 4 teams	Bye	(Soviet Union) Dynamo Moscow	(Spain) Joventut Freixenet
1981–82	Cagiva Varese				4th of 4 teams			
1981–82	Acqua Fabia Rieti		(France) Avignon	(Socialist Federal Republic of Yugoslavia) Iskra Olimpija	2nd of 4 teams			
1981–82	Latte Sole Bologna		(Greece) Iraklis Thessaloniki	(Czechoslovakia) Zbrojovka Brno	2nd of 4 teams			
1981–82	Carrera Venezia				3rd of 4 teams			
1982–83	Binova Cucine Rieti				3rd of 4 teams			
1982–83	Latte Sole Bologna		(Greece) AEK	(France) Monaco				
1982–83	Banco di Roma		(Belgium) CEPF	(Greece) Aris	2nd of 4 teams			
1982–83	Carrera Venezia		(Greece) Iraklis Thessaloniki	(Socialist Federal Republic of Yugoslavia) Crvena zvezda				
1983–84	Cagiva Varese				3rd of 4 teams			
1983–84	Bic Trieste			(Bulgaria) Spartak Pleven	3rd of 4 teams			
1983–84	Carrera Venezia			(Cyprus) Keravnos	3rd of 4 teams			
1983–84	Intesit Caserta		(Scotland) Sonex Falkirk	(Israel) Hapoel Ramat Gan	4th of 4 teams			
1984–85	Simac Milano				1st of 4 teams	Bye	(Socialist Federal Republic of Yugoslavia) Crvena zvezda	(Italy) Ciaocrem Varese
1984–85	Jollycolombani Cantù				2nd of 4 teams			
1984–85	Birra Peroni Livorno			(England) Cars Warrington	2nd of 4 teams			
1984–85	Ciaocrem Varese			(Greece) Panionios	1st of 4 teams	Bye	(Greece) Aris	(Italy) Simac Milano
1985–86	Banco di Roma				1st of 4 teams	Bye	(France) Olympique Antibes	(Italy) Mobilgirgi Caserta
1985–86	Berloni Torino		(Turkey) Çukurova Üniversitesi	(Bulgaria) Spartak Pleven	2nd of 4 teams			
1985–86	Divarese Varese				1st of 4 teams	Bye	(Italy) Mobilgirgi Caserta	
1985–86	Mobilgirgi Caserta			(West Germany) Steiner Bayreuth	1st of 4 teams	Bye	(Italy) Divarese Varese	(Italy) Banco di Roma Virtus
1986–87	Arexons Cantù			(Israel) Elitzur Netanya	2nd of 4 teams			
1986–87	Mobilgirgi Caserta				1st of 4 teams	Bye	(Spain) FC Barcelona	
1986–87	Berloni Torino			(Greece) Panionios	3rd of 4 teams			
1986–87	Divarese Varese			(Israel) Hapoel Tel Aviv	2nd of 4 teams			
1987–88	Divarese Varese		(Luxembourg) T71 Dudelange	Racing Club de France				
1987–88	Arexons Cantù			(Belgium) Trane Castors Braine	2nd of 4 teams			
1987–88	Dietor Bologna			(Czechoslovakia) Nová huť Ostrava	2nd of 4 teams			
1987–88	Snaidero Caserta			(Israel) Hapoel Haifa	4th of 4 teams			
1988–89	Divarese Varese			(Greece) Panathinaikos	2nd of 4 teams			
1988–89	Philips Milano			(Finland) Torpan Pojat	1st of 4 teams	Bye	(Italy) Wiwa Vismara Cantù	
1988–89	Wiwa Vismara Cantù		(Czechoslovakia) VŠ Praha	(Turkey) Tofaş	1st of 4 teams	Bye	(Italy) Philips Milano	(Socialist Federal Republic of Yugoslavia) Partizan
1988–89	Allibert Livorno		(Czechoslovakia) Inter Slovnaft					
1989–90	Scavolini Pesaro			(Israel) Hapoel Tel Aviv	2nd of 4 teams	(France) Pitch Cholet	(Soviet Union) CSKA Moscow	(Spain) Ram Joventut
1989–90	Enimont Livorno			(Spain) Valvi Girona	2nd of 4 teams	(Spain) Ram Joventut		
1989–90	Benetton Treviso		(West Germany) Charlottenburg	(Socialist Federal Republic of Yugoslavia) Smelt Olimpija				
1989–90	Phonola Caserta		(Israel) Hapoel Haifa	(France) Montpellier	3rd of 4 teams			
1990–91	Antifurti Ranger Varese		(Cyprus) APOEL	(Belgium) Go Pass Verviers-Pepinster	3rd of 4 teams			
1990–91	Shampoo Clear Cantù		(Switzerland) Massagno	(Socialist Federal Republic of Yugoslavia) Vojvodina	1st of 4 teams	(Socialist Federal Republic of Yugoslavia) Cibona	(France) Mulhouse	(Spain) Real Madrid
1990–91	Phonola Caserta		(Turkey) Tofaş	(Greece) AEK	1st of 4 teams	(Spain) Real Madrid		
1990–91	Panasonic Reggio Calabria		(Israel) Hapoel Jerusalem	(Greece) Panionios				
1991–92	Il Messaggero Roma		(Belgium) Go Pass Verviers-Pepinster	(France) Reims	1st of 4 teams	(France) Racing Club de Paris	(Spain) Fórum Filatélico Valladolid	(Italy) Scavolini Pesaro
1991–92	Benetton Treviso			(Turkey) Çukurova Üniversitesi	3rd of 4 teams			
1991–92	Shampoo Clear Cantù			(Turkey) Paşabahçe	2nd of 4 teams	(Spain) Taugrés	(Italy) Scavolini Pesaro	
1991–92	Scavolini Pesaro			(Germany) TBB Trier	1st of 4 teams	(France) Pitch Cholet	(Italy) Shampoo Clear Cantù	(Italy) Il Messaggero Roma
1992–93	Philips Milano		(Belgium) Bruxellois	(Croatia) Šibenik Zagreb Montaža	1st of 4 teams	(Greece) Chipita Panionios	(Italy) Shampoo Clear Cantù	(Italy) Virtus Roma
1992–93	Shampoo Clear Cantù		(Luxembourg) Amicale Steinsel	(Slovenia) Optimizem Postojna	1st of 4 teams	(Italy) Phonola Caserta	(Italy) Philips Milano	
1992–93	Virtus Roma		(Switzerland) Ideal Job Union Neuchâtel	(Ukraine) Spartak Lugansk	1st of 4 teams	(Spain) Elosúa León	(Spain) Banca Catalana FC Barcelona	(Italy) Philips Milano
1992–93	Phonola Caserta		(Romania) SOCED București	(Russia) Avtodor Saratov	2nd of 4 teams	(Italy) Shampoo Clear Cantù		
1993–94	Recoaro Milano			(Belgium) Bobcat Gent	2nd of 4 teams	(France) Olympique Antibes	(Italy) Stefanel Trieste	
1993–94	Stefanel Trieste		(Switzerland) Union Neuchâtel	(Russia) Dynamo Moscow	1st of 4 teams	(Greece) Nikas Peristeri	(Italy) Recoaro Milano	(Greece) PAOK Bravo
1993–94	Pfizer Reggio Calabria		(Slovenia) Maricom Miklavž	(France) JDA Dijon	4th of 4 teams			
1993–94	Scavolini Pesaro			(Slovakia) Slávia TU Košice	2nd of 4 teams	(Greece) PAOK Bravo		
1994–95	illycaffè Trieste		(Belgium) Goodyear Belgacom Aalst	(Russia) Spartak Moscow	2nd of 4 teams	(Spain) Cáceres		
1994–95	Birex Verona		(Poland) Mazowzanka	Croatia Line Rijeka	4th of 4 teams			
1994–95	Stefanel Milano			(Estonia) Kalev	2nd of 4 teams	(Greece) Chipita Panionios	(France) Pau-Orthez	(Germany) Alba Berlin
1994–95	Filodoro Bologna		(Slovakia) Ozeta Trenčín	(Czech Republic) USK Praha	1st of 4 teams	(Germany) Alba Berlin		
1995–96	Teamsystem Bologna		(Israel) Hapoel Holon	(Germany) UniVersa Bamberg	1st of 4 teams	(Italy) Scavolini Pesaro	(Turkey) Efes Pilsen	
1995–96	Stefanel Milano			(Lithuania) Šiauliai	1st of 4 teams	(Italy) Cagiva Varese	(France) ASVEL	(Turkey) Efes Pilsen
1995–96	Cagiva Varese		(Bulgaria) Slavia Sofia	Croatia Osiguranje	2nd of 4 teams	(Italy) Stefanel Milano		
1995–96	Scavolini Pesaro		(Croatia) Kantrida Rijeka	(Turkey) PTT	2nd of 4 teams	(Italy) Teamsystem Bologna		
1996–97	Benetton Treviso		1st of 4 teams	(France) JDA Dijon	(Greece) PAOK	(Italy) Telemarket Roma	(Greece) Aris	
1996–97	Cagiva Varese		2nd of 4 teams	(Greece) Nikas Peristeri				
1996–97	Telemarket Roma		1st of 4 teams	(Spain) Turismo Andaluz Granada	(Greece) Soulis Sporting	(Italy) Benetton Treviso		
1996–97	Rolly Pistoia		1st of 4 teams	(Russia) Samara	(Spain) Unicaja			
1997–98	Mash Jeans Verona		1st of 4 teams	(Spain) Tau Cerámica	(Israel) Hapoel Galil Elyon	(Greece) Nikas Peristeri	(Italy) Calze Pompea Roma	(Federal Republic of Yugoslavia) Crvena zvezda
1997–98	Calze Pompea Roma		1st of 4 teams	(Bulgaria) Cherno More Port Varna	(Spain) Unicaja	(Greece) Aris Moda Bagno	(Italy) Mash Jeans Verona	
1997–98	Varese Roosters		1st of 4 teams	(Russia) Spartak Moscow	(France) Cholet			
1997–98	Fontanafredda Siena		2nd of 4 teams	(Federal Republic of Yugoslavia) Crvena zvezda				
1998–99	Ducato Siena		1st of 4 teams	(Portugal) Porto	(Lithuania) Šiauliai	(Spain) FC Barcelona		
1998–99	Aeroporti di Roma Virtus		1st of 4 teams	(Belgium) Okapi Aalstar	(Russia) Arsenal Tula			
1998–99	Pepsi Rimini		3rd of 4 teams					
1998–99	Zucchetti Reggiana		2nd of 4 teams	(Greece) Panionios				
1999–00	Aeroporti di Roma Virtus		1st of 4 teams	(Russia) Lokomotiv Mineralnye Vody	(Poland) Pogoń Ruda Śląska	(Spain) Casademont Girona		
1999–00	Bipop Carire Reggiana		2nd of 3 teams	(Spain) Unicaja				
1999–00	Lineltex Andrea Costa Imola		2nd of 4 teams	(Spain) Casademont Girona				
1999–00	Pepsi Rimini		2nd of 4 teams	(Israel) Maccabi Haifa	(Spain) Casademont Girona			
2000–01	BingoSnai Montecatini		(Germany) Mitteldeutsche	4th of 4 teams				
2000–01	Viola Reggio Calabria		(Hungary) Atomerőmű	1st of 4 teams	(Israel) Maccabi Ramat Gan			
2000–01	Lineltex Andrea Costa Imola		(Switzerland) Olympique Lausanne					
2000–01	Télit Trieste		(Slovenia) Geoplin Slovan	2nd of 4 teams	(Greece) Near East	(Belgium) Athlon Ieper		
2001–02	Euro Roseto		(Cyprus) AEL Limassol					
2001–02	Müller Verona		(Austria) Wörthersee Piraten	3rd of 4 teams				

== See also ==
European basketball clubs in European and worldwide competitions:

- Croatia
- Czechoslovakia
- France
- Greece
- Israel
- Russia
- Spain
- Turkey
- USSR
- Yugoslavia
