= Greek basketball clubs in international competitions =

Greek basketball clubs in European and worldwide competitions is the performance record of men's professional basketball clubs from Greece's top-tier level league, the Greek Basketball League, in international competitions.

== History ==
Greek professional basketball clubs have played in European-wide competitions since the 1957–58 season, when Panellinios took part in the European top-tier level FIBA European Champions Cup (now called EuroLeague). Basketball was the first team sport in which Greek teams won a European-wide competition. AEK won the second-tier level FIBA European Cup Winners' Cup in the 1967–68 season, when they beat Slavia VŠ Praha in the final that took place in Athens.

Record Facts

- Record Guinness (Historical): The 1968 European Cup Winners' Cup final between AEK and Slavia Prague at the Panathenaic Stadium (Kallimarmaro) holds the European attendance record, with an official count of around 100,000 fans (and tens of thousands more outside the stadium).

Nevertheless, Greek basketball was actually mainly boosted following the gold medal-winning triumph at the 1987 EuroBasket and runners-up 1989 EuroBasket, by the senior men's Greek National Team. In the following decades, Greek teams have dominated in European-wide professional club basketball, winning many trophies in continental competitions. The Greek clubs have won nineteen European basketball competition titles.

The Greek teams have won the European first-tier level competitions, the EuroLeague and Basketball Champions League, a total of twelve times, with seven EuroLeague championships being won by Panathinaikos, four EuroLeague championships being won by Olympiacos, and one BCL championship being won by AEK Athens. Also, the Greek basketball clubs have been runners-up in European competitions seventeen times.

Four times the Greek teams have won the Cup Winners' Cup/Saporta Cup, a European second-tier level competition. These clubs are AEK (two times), PAOK, Aris, and Maroussi. Two Greek teams have won the FIBA Korać Cup, a European third-tier level cup. These clubs are Aris, and PAOK. Aris has also won a fourth-tier level European competition once, as they won the FIBA EuroCup Challenge.

Overall, twenty-two Greek basketball clubs have participated in European-wide competitions. AEK, Aris, Iraklis Thessaloniki, Maroussi, Olympiacos, Panathinaikos, Panellinios, Panionios and PAOK have each played in all of the main top three different level tiers. Peristeri has played in competitions of the first and third level tiers. Apollon Patras and Ionikos Neas Filadelfeias have played in competitions of the second and third level tiers. Makedonikos has only played in competitions of the second tier level, and YMCA Thessaloniki, Sporting, Near East, Ionikos Nikaias, Papagou, Irakleio, Olympia Larissa, Olympias Patras and Promitheas Patras BC have only played in competitions of the third level tier. Aris, Lavrio and Iraklis are the only clubs so far to participate at the fourth level tier FIBA Europe Cup.

== The finals ==
=== European-wide competitions ===
Season	Champion	Result	Runner-up	Date	Venue		Ref.
FIBA European Champions Cup & EuroLeague (1st tier)
1993–94	7up Joventut (Spain)	59–57	(Greece) Olympiacos	21/04/1994	Yad Eliyahu Arena, Tel Aviv		
1994–95	Real Madrid Teka (Spain)	73–61	(Greece) Olympiacos	13/04/1995	Pabellón Príncipe Felipe, Zaragoza		
1995–96	Panathinaikos (Greece)	67–66	(Spain) FC Barcelona Banca Catalana	11/04/1996	Palais Omnisports de Paris-Bercy, Paris		
1996–97	Olympiacos (Greece)	73–58	(Spain) FC Barcelona Banca Catalana	24/04/1997	Palaeur, Rome		
1997–98	Kinder Bologna (Italy)	58–44	(Greece) AEK	23/04/1998	Palau Sant Jordi, Barcelona		
1999–00	Panathinaikos (Greece)	73–67	(Israel) Maccabi Elite Tel Aviv	20/04/2000	P.A.O.K. Sports Arena, Thessaloniki		
2000–01	Maccabi Elite Tel Aviv (Israel)	81–67	(Greece) Panathinaikos	13/05/2001	Palais Omnisports de Paris-Bercy, Paris		
2001–02	Panathinaikos (Greece)	89–83	(Italy) Kinder Bologna	05/05/2002	PalaMalaguti, Casalecchio di Reno		
2006–07	Panathinaikos (Greece)	93–91	(Russia) CSKA Moscow	06/05/2007	O.A.K.A. Indoor Hall, Athens		
2008–09	Panathinaikos (Greece)	73–71	(Russia) CSKA Moscow	03/05/2009	O2 World, Berlin		
2009–10	Regal FC Barcelona (Spain)	86–68	(Greece) Olympiacos	09/05/2010	Palais Omnisports de Paris-Bercy, Paris		
2010–11	Panathinaikos (Greece)	78–70	(Israel) Maccabi Electra Tel Aviv	08/05/2011	Palau Sant Jordi, Barcelona		
2011–12	Olympiacos (Greece)	62–61	(Russia) CSKA Moscow	13/05/2012	Sinan Erdem Dome, Istanbul		
2012–13	Olympiacos (Greece)	100–88	(Spain) Real Madrid	12/05/2013	The O2 Arena, London		
2014–15	Real Madrid (Spain)	78–59	(Greece) Olympiacos	17/05/2015	Barclaycard Center, Madrid		
2016–17	Fenerbahçe (Turkey)	80–64	(Greece) Olympiacos	21/05/2017	Sinan Erdem Dome, Istanbul		
2022–23	Real Madrid (Spain)	79–78	(Greece) Olympiacos	21/05/2023	Žalgiris Arena, Kaunas		
2023–24	Panathinaikos (Greece)	95–80	(Spain) Real Madrid	26/05/2024	Uber Arena, Berlin		
2025–26	Olympiacos (Greece)	92–85	(Spain) Real Madrid	24/05/2026	Telekom Center Athens, Athens		
EuroLeague SuperCup
2026	Olympiacos (Greece)	89–93	(Spain) Real Madrid	20/09/2026	Abu Dhabi, UAE		
FIBA European Cup Winners' Cup & FIBA Saporta Cup (2nd tier)
1967–68	AEK (Greece)	89–82	(Czechoslovakia) Slavia VŠ Praha	04/04/1968	Panathenaic Kalimarmaro Stadium, Athens		
1990–91	PAOK (Greece)	76–72	(Spain) CAI Zaragoza	26/03/1991	Patinoire de Vernets, Geneva		
1991–92	Real Madrid Asegurator (Spain)	65–63	(Greece) PAOK	17/03/1992	Palais des Sports de Beaulieu, Nantes		
1992–93	Sato Aris (Greece)	50–48	(Turkey) Efes Pilsen	16/03/1993	PalaRuffini, Turin		
1995–96	Taugrés (Spain)	88–81	(Greece) PAOK	12/03/1996	Pabellón Araba, Vitoria-Gasteiz		
1999–00	AEK (Greece)	83–76	(Italy) Kinder Bologna	11/04/2000	Centre Intercommunal de Glace de Malley, Lausanne		
2000–01	Maroussi (Greece)	74–72	(France) Élan Chalon	17/04/2001	Hala Torwar, Warsaw		
EuroCup Basketball (2nd tier)
2004–05	Lietuvos rytas (Lithuania)	78–74	(Greece) Makedonikos	19/04/2005	Spiroudome, Charleroi		
2005–06	Dynamo Moscow (Russia)	73–60	(Greece) Aris TT Bank	11/04/2006	Spiroudome, Charleroi		
FIBA Korać Cup (3rd tier)
1993–94	PAOK Bravo (Greece)	175–156 (two-leg)	(Italy) Stefanel Trieste	09 & 16/03/1994	Alexandreio Melathron, Thessaloniki	PalaTrieste, Trieste	
1996–97	Aris (Greece)	154–147 (two-leg)	(Turkey) Tofaş	26/03 & 03/04/1997	Alexandreio Melathron, Thessaloniki	Bursa Atatürk Spor Salonu, Bursa	
FIBA Basketball Champions League (3rd tier)
2017–18	AEK (Greece)	100–94	(France) Monaco	04/05/2018	Nikos Galis Olympic Indoor Hall, Athens		
2019–20	San Pablo Burgos (Spain)	85–74	(Greece) AEK	04/10/2020	Nikos Galis Olympic Indoor Hall, Athens		
2025–26	Rytas (Lithuania)	92–86 (OT)	(Greece) AEK	09/05/2026	Pavelló Olímpic, Badalona		
FIBA EuroChallenge (3rd tier)
2003–04	UNICS (Russia)	87–63	(Greece) Maroussi TIM	24/04/2004	Basket-Hall Kazan, Kazan		
FIBA Europe Cup (4th tier)
2024–25	SURNE Bilbao (Spain)	154–149 (two-leg)	(Greece) PAOK	16 & 23/04/2025	Bilbao Arena, Bilbao	PAOK Sports Arena, Thessaloniki	
2025–26	SURNE Bilbao (Spain)	162–153 (two-leg)	(Greece) PAOK	22 & 29/04/2026	PAOK Sports Arena, Thessaloniki	Bilbao Arena, Bilbao	
FIBA EuroCup Challenge (4th tier)
2002–03	Aris (Greece)	84–83	(Poland) Prokom Trefl Sopot	04/05/2003	Alexandreio Melathron, Thessaloniki		

=== World-wide competitions ===
Season	Champion	Result	Runner-up	Date	Venue		Ref.
FIBA Intercontinental Cup
1996	Panathinaikos (Greece)	2–1 Play-off	(Argentina) Olimpia	04, 10 & 12/09/1996	Estadio Cubierto Newell's Old Boys, Rosario	O.A.K.A. Indoor Hall, Athens	
2013	Olympiacos (Greece)	167–139 (two-leg)	(Brazil) Pinheiros Sky	04 & 06/10/2013	Ginásio José Corrêa, Barueri, São Paulo		
2019	AEK (Greece)	86–70 Final-4	(Brazil) Flamengo	17/02/2019	Carioca Arena 1, Rio de Janeiro		
McDonald's Championship
1997	Chicago Bulls (United States)	104–78	(Greece) Olympiacos	18/10/1997	Palais Omnisports de Paris-Bercy, Paris		

== Greek clubs in EuroLeague (first-tier) 1958 – present ==
=== Achievements ===
EuroLeague
Rank	Club		Silver medal	Total
1.	Panathinaikos	7	1	8
2.	Olympiacos	4	6	10
3.	AEK	0	1	1
4.	Aris	0	0	0
5.	PAOK	0	0	0

=== Appearances ===
Since 2000 only Panathinaikos and Olympiakos can play in the Euroleague because they own EuroLeague#Licences and since ULEB 1992 that was the beginning of Euroleague that gave 13 teams the control of the European basketball

Rank	Club	Appearances	Years
1.	Panathinaikos	20 Fiba 26 Euro league with license.	1962, 1963, 1968, 1970, 1972, 1973, 1974, 1975, 1976, 1978, 1981, 1982, 1983, 1985, 1994, 1995, 1996, 1997, 1999, 2000, 2001†, 2002, 2003, 2004, 2005, 2006, 2007, 2008, 2009, 2010, 2011, 2012, 2013, 2014, 2015, 2016, 2017, 2018, 2019, 2020, 2021, 2022, 2023, 2024, 2025, 2026
2.	Olympiacos	9 Fiba 27 Euro league with license.	1961, 1977, 1979, 1993, 1994, 1995, 1996, 1997, 1998, 1999, 2000, 2001, 2002, 2003, 2004, 2005, 2006, 2007, 2008, 2009, 2010, 2011, 2012, 2013, 2014, 2015, 2016, 2017, 2018, 2019, 2020, 2021, 2022, 2023, 2024, 2025, 2026
3.	AEK	8 Fiba 6 Euro league without license.	1959, 1964, 1965, 1966, 1967, 1969, 1971, 1998, 2001, 2002, 2003, 2004, 2005, 2006
4.	Aris	9 Fiba 2 Euro league without license.	1980, 1984, 1986, 1987, 1988, 1989, 1990, 1991, 1992, 2007, 2008
5.	PAOK	5 Fiba 2 Euro league without license.	1960, 1993, 1995, 1998, 1999, 2000, 2001
6.	Iraklis	2 Fiba	1996, 2001†
7.	Panionios	1 Fiba 1 Euro league without license.	1997, 2009
8.	Peristeri	2 Euro league without license.	2001, 2002
9.	Panellinios	1 Fiba	1958
10.	Maroussi	1 Euro league without license.	2010

=== Season to season ===
Year	Team	_______ Earlier stage _______	________ Last 24 to 32 ________	________ Last 12 to 16 ________	_________ Last 6 to 8 _________	_________ Semifinals _________	____________ Final ____________
1958	Panellinios		(Romania) CCA București				
1958–59	AEK			(Socialist Federal Republic of Yugoslavia) OKK Beograd			
1959–60	PAOK		(Romania) CCA București				
1960–61	Olympiacos		(Turkey) Galatasaray				
1961–62	Panathinaikos		(Israel) Hapoel Tel Aviv				
1962–63	Panathinaikos			(Spain) Real Madrid			
1963–64	AEK		(Turkey) Galatasaray				
1964–65	AEK		(Israel) Maccabi Tel Aviv	(Belgium) Antwerpse	(Socialist Federal Republic of Yugoslavia) OKK Beograd		
1965–66	AEK			(Morocco) Wydad Casablanca	2nd of 4 teams	(Czechoslovakia) Slavia VŠ Praha	(Soviet Union) CSKA Moscow (4th)
1966–67	AEK			(France) ASVEL			
1967–68	Panathinaikos		(Romania) Steaua București	(Socialist Federal Republic of Yugoslavia) Zadar			
1968–69	AEK		(Portugal) Lourenço Marques	(Bulgaria) Academic			
1969–70	Panathinaikos			(Socialist Federal Republic of Yugoslavia) Crvena zvezda			
1970–71	AEK		(Morocco) Fath Union Sport	(France) Olympique Antibes			
1971–72	Panathinaikos		(Luxembourg) Amicale Steinsel	(Israel) Maccabi Elite Tel Aviv	2nd of 4 teams	(Italy) Ignis Varese	
1972–73	Panathinaikos		(Bulgaria) Academic				
1973–74	Panathinaikos		(Poland) Wybrzeże Gdańsk	(France) Berck			
1974–75	Panathinaikos		(Israel) Maccabi Elite Tel Aviv				
1975–76	Panathinaikos		(Finland) Turun NMKY				
1976–77	Olympiacos		4th of 4 teams				
1977–78	Panathinaikos		2nd of 4 teams				
1978–79	Olympiacos		1st of 4 teams	Bye	6th of 6 teams		
1979–80	Aris		3rd of 4 teams				
1980–81	Panathinaikos		3rd of 4 teams				
1981–82	Panathinaikos		1st of 4 teams	Bye	6th of 6 teams		
1982–83	Panathinaikos		(France) Moderne				
1983–84	Aris	(Cyprus) AEL Limassol	(West Germany) ASC 1846 Göttingen	(Israel) Maccabi Elite Tel Aviv			
1984–85	Panathinaikos		(Poland) Lech Poznań	(Italy) Granarolo Bologna			
1985–86	Aris	(Albania) Partizani Tirana	(West Germany) Bayer 04 Leverkusen	(France) Limoges CSP			
1986–87	Aris		(Belgium) Sunair Oostende	(Italy) Tracer Milano			
1987–88	Aris			(Switzerland) Pully	2nd of 8 teams	(Italy) Tracer Milano	(Socialist Federal Republic of Yugoslavia) Partizan (4th)
1988–89	Aris		(Cyprus) AEL Limassol	(Sweden) Södertälje	4th of 8 teams	(Israel) Maccabi Elite Tel Aviv	(Spain) FC Barcelona
1989–90	Aris			(Bulgaria) Balkan Botevgrad	4th of 8 teams	(Spain) FC Barcelona	(France) Limoges CSP (4th)
1990–91	Aris			(Finland) Uudenkaupungin Urheilijat	5th of 8 teams		
1991–92	Aris	(Albania) Partizani Tirana	(Poland) Śląsk Wrocław	7th of 8 teams			
1992–93	PAOK	(Cyprus) Pezoporikos Larnaca	(Federal Republic of Yugoslavia) Crvena zvezda	1st of 8 teams	(France) Pau-Orthez	(Italy) Benetton Treviso	(Spain) Real Madrid Teka
1992–93	Olympiacos		(Slovenia) Smelt Olimpija	3rd of 8 teams	(France) Limoges CSP		
1993–94	Olympiacos			1st of 8 teams	(Italy) Buckler Beer Bologna	(Greece) Panathinaikos	(Spain) 7up Joventut
1993–94	Panathinaikos		(Bulgaria) Levski Sofia	2nd of 8 teams	(France) Limoges CSP	(Greece) Olympiacos	(Spain) Banca Catalana FC Barcelona
1994–95	Olympiacos			2nd of 8 teams	(Russia) CSKA Moscow	(Greece) Panathinaikos	(Spain) Real Madrid Teka
1994–95	PAOK Bravo		(Israel) Hapoel Tel Aviv	6th of 8 teams			
1994–95	Panathinaikos		(Ukraine) Inpromservis Kyiv	1st of 8 teams	(Italy) Buckler Beer Bologna	(Greece) Olympiacos	(France) Limoges CSP
1995–96	Olympiacos			3rd of 8 teams	(Spain) Real Madrid Teka		
1995–96	Panathinaikos		(Lithuania) Žalgiris	3rd of 8 teams	(Italy) Benetton Treviso	(Russia) CSKA Moscow	(Spain) Banca Catalana FC Barcelona
1995–96	Iraklis Aspis Pronoia		(Israel) Hapoel Galil Elyon	8th of 8 teams			
1996–97	Olympiacos	5th of 6 teams	3rd of 6 teams	(Federal Republic of Yugoslavia) Partizan	(Greece) Panathinaikos	(Slovenia) Smelt Olimpija	(Spain) Banca Catalana FC Barcelona
1996–97	Panathinaikos	1st of 6 teams	1st of 6 teams	(France) Limoges CSP	(Greece) Olympiacos		
1996–97	Panionios Afisorama	6th of 6 teams	6th of 6 teams				
1997–98	Olympiacos	1st of 6 teams	1st of 6 teams	(Federal Republic of Yugoslavia) Partizan			
1997–98	AEK	1st of 6 teams	1st of 6 teams	(Croatia) Split	(Germany) Alba Berlin	(Italy) Benetton Treviso	(Italy) Kinder Bologna
1997–98	PAOK	3rd of 6 teams	3rd of 6 teams	(Germany) Alba Berlin			
1998–99	Panathinaikos	1st of 6 teams	1st of 6 teams	(Italy) Teamsystem Bologna			
1998–99	PAOK	5th of 6 teams	5th of 6 teams				
1998–99	Olympiacos	1st of 6 teams	1st of 6 teams	(Italy) Varese Roosters	(France) ASVEL	(Lithuania) Žalgiris	(Italy) Teamsystem Bologna
1999–00	Panathinaikos	1st of 6 teams	1st of 6 teams	(Federal Republic of Yugoslavia) Budućnost	(Croatia) Cibona	(Turkey) Efes Pilsen	(Israel) Maccabi Elite Tel Aviv
1999–00	Olympiacos	2nd of 6 teams	3rd of 6 teams	(Slovenia) Smelt Olimpija			
1999–00	PAOK	4th of 6 teams	4th of 6 teams	(Israel) Maccabi Elite Tel Aviv			
2000–01	Panathinaikos		1st of 10 teams	(Slovenia) Krka	(Germany) Alba Berlin	(Turkey) Efes Pilsen	(Israel) Maccabi Elite Tel Aviv
2000–01	Iraklis Thessaloniki		4th of 10 teams	(Germany) Alba Berlin			
2000–01	PAOK		2nd of 6 teams	(Slovenia) Union Olimpija			
2000–01	Olympiacos		1st of 6 teams	(Italy) Müller Verona	(Spain) Tau Cerámica		
2000–01	Peristeri		2nd of 6 teams	(Spain) Tau Cerámica			
2000–01	AEK		2nd of 6 teams	(Lithuania) Žalgiris	(Italy) Benetton Treviso	(Spain) Tau Cerámica	
2001–02	Panathinaikos		1st of 8 teams	1st of 4 teams	Bye	(Israel) Maccabi Elite Tel Aviv	(Italy) Kinder Bologna
2001–02	Olympiacos		3rd of 8 teams	2nd of 4 teams			
2001–02	Peristeri		7th of 8 teams				
2001–02	AEK		2nd of 8 teams	3rd of 4 teams			
2002–03	AEK		8th of 8 teams				
2002–03	Olympiacos		3rd of 8 teams	2nd of 4 teams			
2002–03	Panathinaikos		1st of 8 teams	3rd of 4 teams			
2003–04	Panathinaikos		5th of 8 teams	4th of 4 teams			
2003–04	AEK		6th of 8 teams				
2003–04	Olympiacos		5th of 8 teams	4th of 4 teams			
2004–05	Panathinaikos		2nd of 8 teams	1st of 4 teams	(Turkey) Efes Pilsen	(Israel) Maccabi Elite Tel Aviv	(Russia) CSKA Moscow
2004–05	AEK		4th of 8 teams	3rd of 4 teams			
2004–05	Olympiacos		7th of 8 teams				
2005–06	Panathinaikos		2nd of 8 teams	1st of 4 teams	(Spain) Tau Cerámica		
2005–06	AEK		8th of 8 teams				
2005–06	Olympiacos		5th of 8 teams	2nd of 4 teams	(Israel) Maccabi Elite Tel Aviv		
2006–07	Panathinaikos		1st of 8 teams	1st of 4 teams	(Russia) Dynamo Moscow	(Spain) Tau Cerámica	(Russia) CSKA Moscow
2006–07	Olympiacos		3rd of 8 teams	2nd of 4 teams	(Spain) Tau Cerámica		
2006–07	Aris TT Bank		5th of 8 teams	4th of 4 teams			
2007–08	Panathinaikos		1st of 8 teams	3rd of 4 teams			
2007–08	Olympiacos		5th of 8 teams	2nd of 4 teams	(Russia) CSKA Moscow		
2007–08	Aris TT Bank		5th of 8 teams	4th of 4 teams			
2008–09	Panathinaikos		3rd of 6 teams	1st of 4 teams	(Italy) Montepaschi Siena	(Greece) Olympiacos	(Russia) CSKA Moscow
2008–09	Olympiacos		2nd of 6 teams	1st of 4 teams	(Spain) Real Madrid	(Greece) Panathinaikos	(Spain) Regal FC Barcelona (4th)
2008–09	Panionios Forthnet		6th of 6 teams				
2009–10	Panathinaikos		2nd of 6 teams	3rd of 4 teams			
2009–10	Olympiacos		1st of 6 teams	1st of 4 teams	(Poland) Asseco Prokom Gdynia	(Serbia) Partizan	(Spain) Regal FC Barcelona
2009–10	Maroussi	(Germany) Alba Berlin	4th of 6 teams	4th of 4 teams			
2010–11	Panathinaikos		1st of 6 teams	2nd of 4 teams	(Spain) Regal FC Barcelona	(Italy) Montepaschi Siena	(Israel) Maccabi Electra Tel Aviv
2010–11	Olympiacos		1st of 6 teams	1st of 4 teams	(Italy) Montepaschi Siena		
2011–12	Panathinaikos		2nd of 6 teams	1st of 4 teams	(Israel) Maccabi Electra Tel Aviv	(Russia) CSKA Moscow	(Spain) FC Barcelona Regal (4th)
2011–12	Olympiacos		2nd of 6 teams	2nd of 4 teams	(Italy) Montepaschi Siena	(Spain) FC Barcelona Regal	(Russia) CSKA Moscow
2012–13	Olympiacos		2nd of 6 teams	2nd of 8 teams	(Turkey) Anadolu Efes	(Russia) CSKA Moscow	(Spain) Real Madrid
2012–13	Panathinaikos		3rd of 6 teams	4th of 8 teams	(Spain) FC Barcelona Regal		
2013–14	Panathinaikos		4th of 6 teams	4th of 8 teams	(Russia) CSKA Moscow		
2013–14	Olympiacos		1st of 6 teams	3rd of 8 teams	(Spain) Real Madrid		
2014–15	Panathinaikos		3rd of 6 teams	4th of 8 teams	(Russia) CSKA Moscow		
2014–15	Olympiacos		1st of 6 teams	3rd of 8 teams	(Spain) FC Barcelona	(Russia) CSKA Moscow	(Spain) Real Madrid
2015–16	Olympiacos		1st of 6 teams	7th of 8 teams			
2015–16	Panathinaikos		3rd of 6 teams	3rd of 8 teams	(Spain) Laboral Kutxa		
2016–17	Olympiacos			3rd of 16 teams	(Turkey) Anadolu Efes	(Russia) CSKA Moscow	(Turkey) Fenerbahçe
2016–17	Panathinaikos Superfoods			4th of 16 teams	(Turkey) Fenerbahçe		
2017–18	Panathinaikos Superfoods			4th of 16 teams	(Spain) Real Madrid		
2017–18	Olympiacos			3rd of 16 teams	(Lithuania) Žalgiris		
2018–19	Panathinaikos OPAP			6th of 16 teams	(Spain) Real Madrid		
2018–19	Olympiacos			9th of 16 teams			
2019–20	Panathinaikos OPAP			6th of 18 teams			
2019–20	Olympiacos			11th of 18 teams			
2020–21	Panathinaikos OPAP			16th of 18 teams			
2020–21	Olympiacos			12th of 18 teams			
2021–22	Panathinaikos OPAP			13th of 18 teams			
2021–22	Olympiacos			2nd of 18 teams	(France) Monaco	(Turkey) Anadolu Efes	
2022–23	Panathinaikos OPAP			17th of 18 teams			
2022–23	Olympiacos			1st of 18 teams	(Turkey) Fenerbahçe Beko	(France) Monaco	(Spain) Real Madrid
2023–24	Panathinaikos AKTOR			2nd of 18 teams	(Israel) Maccabi Playtika Tel Aviv	(Turkey) Fenerbahçe Beko	(Spain) Real Madrid
2023–24	Olympiacos			5th of 18 teams	(Spain) Barcelona	(Spain) Real Madrid	(Turkey) Fenerbahçe Beko
2024–25	Panathinaikos AKTOR			3rd of 18 teams	(Turkey) Anadolu Efes	(Turkey) Fenerbahçe Beko	(Greece) Olympiacos (4th)
2024–25	Olympiacos			1st of 18 teams	(Spain) Real Madrid	(France) Monaco	(Greece) Panathinaikos AKTOR
2025–26	Panathinaikos AKTOR			7th of 18 teams Play-in A (France) Monaco	(Spain) Valencia		
2025–26	Olympiacos			1st of 18 teams	(France) Monaco	(Turkey) Fenerbahçe Beko	(Spain) Real Madrid

== Greek clubs in Basketball Champions League (first-tier) 2016/17 – present ==
=== Achievements ===
FIBA Champions League
Rank	Club		Silver medal	SF	QF
1.	AEK	1	2	1	2
2.	Peristeri			1	
3.	Promitheas				1

=== Appearances ===
Rank	Club	Appearances	Years
1.	AEK	11	2017, 2018, 2019, 2020, 2021, 2022, 2023, 2024, 2025, 2026, 2027
2.	PAOK	8	2017, 2018, 2019, 2020, 2022, 2023, 2024, 2026
3.	Peristeri	7	2020, 2021, 2022, 2023, 2024, 2025, 2027
4.	Promitheas Patras	5	2019, 2024, 2025, 2026, 2027
5.	Aris	3	2017, 2018, 2019
6.	Kolossos Rodou	2	2025, 2027
7.	Iraklis	1	2021
8.	Lavrio	1	2022
9.	ASK Karditsa	1	2026

=== Season to season ===
Year	Team	___________ Last 40 ___________	___________ Last 32 ___________	___________ Last 16 ___________	___________ Last 8 ___________	_________ Semifinals _________	____________ Final ____________
2016–17	AEK	2nd of 8 teams	(Lithuania) Juventus	(France) Monaco			
2016–17	Aris	4th of 8 teams	(France) SIG Strasbourg	(France) ASVEL			
2016–17	PAOK	4th of 8 teams	(Serbia) Partizan NIS	(Spain) Iberostar Tenerife			
2017–18	AEK		3rd of 8 teams	(Czech Republic) ČEZ Nymburk	(France) SIG Strasbourg	(Spain) UCAM Murcia	(France) Monaco
2017–18	Aris		8th of 8 teams				
2017–18	PAOK		3rd of 8 teams	(Turkey) Pınar Karşıyaka			
2018–19	AEK		1st of 8 teams	(Greece) PAOK	(Germany) Bamberg		
2018–19	PAOK		4th of 8 teams	(Greece) AEK			
2018–19	Promitheas		4th of 8 teams	(Spain) Iberostar Tenerife			
2019–20	AEK		2nd of 8 teams	(Germany) Telekom Bonn	(Czech Republic) ERA Nymburk	(Spain) Casademont Zaragoza	(Spain) San Pablo Burgos
2019–20	PAOK		7th of 8 teams				
2019–20	Peristeri		4th of 8 teams	(Israel) Hapoel Jerusalem			
2020–21	AEK		2nd of 4 teams	3rd of 4 teams			
2020–21	Peristeri		3rd of 4 teams				
2021–22	AEK		4th of 4 teams				
2021–22	PAOK		3rd of 4 teams	(France) SIG Strasbourg			
2021–22	Lavrio Megabolt		3rd of 4 teams	(Italy) NutriBullet Treviso			
2022–23	AEK		2nd of 4 teams Play-ins (Turkey) Tofaş	2nd of 4 teams	(Israel) Hapoel Jerusalem		
2022–23	PAOK		3rd of 4 teams Play-ins (Lithuania) Rytas				
2022–23	Peristeri		3rd of 4 teams Play-ins (France) JDA Dijon				
2023–24	AEK		1st of 4 teams	4th of 4 teams			
2023–24	PAOK		2nd of 4 teams Play-ins (Turkey) Tofaş				
2023–24	Peristeri		3rd of 4 teams Play-ins (Lithuania) Rytas	2nd of 4 teams	(Germany) Telekom Bonn	(Spain) Lenovo Tenerife	(Spain) UCAM Murcia (4th)
2023–24	Promitheas		3rd of 4 teams Play-ins (France) Le Mans Sarthe	2nd of 4 teams	(Spain) Unicaja Málaga		
2024–25	AEK		1st of 4 teams	1st of 4 teams	(France) Nanterre 92	(Spain) Unicaja Málaga	(Spain) La Laguna Tenerife
2024–25	Peristeri Domino's		3rd of 4 teams Play-ins (Italy) Bertram Derthona Tortona				
2024–25	Promitheas		3rd of 4 teams Play-ins (Turkey) Karşıyaka Basket	4th of 4 teams			
2024–25	Kolossos H Hotels		4th of 4 teams				
2025–26	AEK		1st of 4 teams	1st of 4 teams	(Spain) Joventut Badalona	(Spain) Unicaja Málaga	(Lithuania) Rytas
2025–26	PAOK	QF (Montenegro) SC Derby; SF (Turkey) Bursaspor					
2025–26	Promitheas		4th of 4 teams				
2025–26	ASK Karditsa		3rd of 4 teams	4th of 4 teams			
2026–27	AEK		TBD				
2026–27	Peristeri Betsson		TBD				
2026–27	Promitheas	Eight-finals (Austria) Vienna					
2026–27	Kolossos H Hotels	Eight-finals (Turkey) Glint Manisa					

== Greek clubs in FIBA Saporta Cup (second-tier) 1966/67 – 2001/02 ==
=== Achievements ===
FIBA Saporta Cup
Rank	Club		Silver medal	SF	QF
1.	AEK	2	0	1	2
2.	PAOK	1	2	1	1
3.	Aris	1	0	2	0
4.	Maroussi	1	0	0	0
5.	Panathinaikos	0	0	2	2
6.	Iraklis	0	0	2	1
7.	Olympiacos	0	0	0	1
8.	Panionios	0	0	0	1

=== Appearances ===
Rank	Club	Appearances	Years
1.	AEK	9	1968, 1970, 1972, 1975, 1977, 1982, 1989, 1999, 2000
2.	Panathinaikos	7	1969, 1971, 1980, 1984, 1986, 1987, 1998
3.	PAOK	6	1983, 1985, 1990, 1991, 1992, 1996
4.	Aris	5	1967, 1993, 1994, 1999, 2001
5.	Olympiacos	5	1973, 1974, 1976, 1978, 1981
6.	Iraklis	4	1995, 1997, 2000, 2002
7.	Panionios	2	1992, 2002
8.	Apollon Patras	2	1997, 1998
9.	Panellinios	1	1988
10.	Maroussi	1	2001

=== Season to season ===
Year	Team	_______ Earlier stage _______	___________ Last 48 ___________	________ Last 24 to 32 ________	________ Last 12 to 16 ________	_________ Last 6 to 8 _________	_________ Semifinals _________	____________ Final ____________
1966–67	Aris				(Israel) Maccabi Tel Aviv			
1967–68	AEK				(Spain) Kas Vitoria	(Belgium) Royal IV	(Italy) Ignis Varese	(Czechoslovakia) Slavia VŠ Praha
1968–69	Panathinaikos			(Austria) Handeslministerium	(Portugal) Benfica	(Italy) Fides Napoli	(Soviet Union) Dinamo Tbilisi	
1969–70	AEK				(Hungary) Soproni MAFC	(Spain) Juventud Nerva	(France) JA Vichy	
1970–71	Panathinaikos			(West Germany) VfL Osnabrück	(Israel) Hapoel Tel Aviv			
1971–72	AEK			(Turkey) Beşiktaş	(Bulgaria) Levski-Spartak	3rd of 3 teams		
1972–73	Olympiacos			(Netherlands) Raak Punch	(Czechoslovakia) Spartak ZJŠ Brno			
1973–74	Olympiacos			(Hungary) Soproni MAFC	(Bulgaria) CSKA Septemvriisko zname			
1974–75	AEK			(Netherlands) Raak Punch	(Bulgaria) CSKA Septemvriisko zname			
1975–76	Olympiacos			(Israel) Hapoel Gvat/Yagur	(Austria) Soma Wien	4th of 4 teams		
1976–77	AEK			(Czechoslovakia) Slavia VŠ Praha				
1977–78	Olympiacos			(Israel) Hapoel Tel Aviv	(Italy) Sinudyne Bologna			
1979–80	Panathinaikos			(Egypt) Union Récréation Alexandria	(Bulgaria) CSKA Sofia	3rd of 4 teams		
1980–81	Olympiacos			(Belgium) Verviers-Pepinster				
1981–82	AEK			(Hungary) Soproni MAFC	(Netherlands) Parker Leiden			
1982–83	PAOK		(Cyprus) AEL Limassol	(Israel) Hapoel Ramat Gan				
1983–84	Panathinaikos			(Bulgaria) Levski-Spartak	(Austria) Landys&Gyr Wien	3rd of 4 teams		
1984–85	PAOK			(Hungary) Csepel	(Socialist Federal Republic of Yugoslavia) Bosna	4th of 4 teams		
1985–86	Panathinaikos			(Luxembourg) Sparta Bertrange	(Switzerland) Vevey			
1986–87	Panathinaikos			(West Germany) Steiner Bayreuth				
1987–88	Panellinios		(Portugal) Porto					
1988–89	AEK				(Switzerland) Pully	4th of 4 teams		
1989–90	PAOK				(Portugal) Ovarense	2nd of 4 teams	(Italy) Knorr Bologna	
1990–91	PAOK				(England) Sunderland Saints	2nd of 4 teams	(Soviet Union) Dynamo Moscow	(Spain) CAI Zaragoza
1991–92	Panionios	(Bulgaria) Slavia Sofia	(Czech Republic) Sparta Praha	(Cyprus) Pezoporikos Larnaca	4th of 6 teams			
1991–92	PAOK		(Cyprus) APOEL	Bye	1st of 6 teams	Bye	(Slovenia) Smelt Olimpija	(Spain) Real Madrid Asegurator
1992–93	Sato Aris		(Belarus) RTI Minsk	(Poland) Śląsk Wrocław	1st of 6 teams	Bye	(Spain) NatWest Zaragoza	(Turkey) Efes Pilsen
1993–94	Sato Aris		(Cyprus) APOEL	(Israel) Hapoel Ramat Gan	2nd of 6 teams	Bye	(Slovenia) Smelt Olimpija	
1994–95	Iraklis Aspis Pronoia		(Hungary) Marc-Körmend	(Slovenia) Kovinotehna Savinjska Polzela	2nd of 6 teams	Bye	(Spain) Taugrés	
1995–96	PAOK	(Cyprus) PAEEK	(Slovenia) Postojna	(Ukraine) Budivelnyk	1st of 6 teams	Bye	(Lithuania) Žalgiris	(Spain) Taugrés
1996–97	Iraklis Thessaloniki		1st of 6 teams	(Czech Republic) Stavex Brno	(Spain) TDK Manresa	(Israel) Hapoel Jerusalem	(Italy) Mash Jeans Verona	
1996–97	Dexim Apollon Patras		1st of 6 teams	(Croatia) Zadar	(Turkey) Türk Telekom PTT			
1997–98	Apollon Patras		2nd of 6 teams	(Israel) Hapoel Eilat				
1997–98	Panathinaikos		1st of 6 teams	(Germany) Bayer 04 Leverkusen	(Israel) Hapoel Eilat	(Poland) Śląsk Wrocław	(Italy) Stefanel Milano	
1998–99	Aris		1st of 6 teams	(Lithuania) Lietuvos rytas	(Latvia) Ventspils	(Slovenia) Pivovarna Laško	(Spain) Pamesa Valencia	
1998–99	AEK		3rd of 6 teams	(Federal Republic of Yugoslavia) Budućnost				
1999–00	AEK		1st of 6 teams	(Slovenia) Kovinotehna Savinjska Polzela	(Spain) Tau Cerámica	(Greece) Iraklis Thessaloniki	(Croatia) Zadar	(Italy) Kinder Bologna
1999–00	Iraklis Thessaloniki		1st of 6 teams	(Sweden) Norrköping Dolphins	(Croatia) Split CO	(Greece) AEK		
2000–01	Maroussi			2nd of 6 teams	(Greece) Aris	(Germany) Telekom Baskets Bonn	(Russia) UNICS	(France) Élan Chalon
2000–01	Aris			3rd of 6 teams	(Greece) Maroussi			
2001–02	Panionios			2nd of 6 teams	(Turkey) Türk Telekom	(Poland) Anwil Włocławek		
2001–02	Iraklis Thessaloniki			2nd of 6 teams	(Russia) UNICS			

== Greek clubs in EuroCup (second-tier) 2002/03 – present ==
=== Achievements ===
EuroCup
Rank	Club		Silver medal	SF	QF
1.	Aris	0	1	0	1
2.	Makedonikos	0	1	0	0
3.	Panellinios	0	0	1	0
4.	Maroussi	0	0	0	1
5.	PAOK	0	0	0	1

=== Appearances ===
Rank	Club	Appearances	Years
1.	Aris	8	2005, 2006, 2009, 2010, 2011, 2012, 2016, 2024
2.	PAOK	7	2005, 2007, 2011, 2012, 2014, 2015, 2016
3.	Panionios	4	2006, 2008, 2013, 2014
4.	Panellinios	4	2008, 2009, 2010, 2011
5.	Promitheas Patras	3	2020, 2021, 2022
6.	Makedonikos	2	2004, 2005
7.	Maroussi	2	2005, 2009
8.	AEK	2	2007, 2016
9.	Ionikos N.F.	1	2004

=== Season to season ===
Year	Team	_______ Earlier stage _______	___________ Last 48 ___________	________ Last 24 to 32 ________	________ Last 12 to 16 ________	_________ Last 6 to 8 _________	_________ Semifinals _________	____________ Final ____________
2003–04	Ionikos Egnatia Bank		6th of 6 teams					
2003–04	Makedonikos		2nd of 6 teams	Bye	(Spain) Caprabo Lleida			
2004–05	Aris Egnatia Bank		3rd of 6 teams	Bye	(Lithuania) Lietuvos rytas			
2004–05	PAOK		1st of 6 teams	Bye	(France) Cholet	(Lithuania) Lietuvos rytas		
2004–05	Maroussi Honda		1st of 6 teams	Bye	(Poland) Deichmann Śląsk Wrocław	(Greece) Makedonikos		
2004–05	Makedonikos		1st of 6 teams	Bye	(Italy) Castigroup Varese	(Greece) Maroussi Honda	(Serbia and Montenegro) Hemofarm	(Lithuania) Lietuvos rytas
2005–06	Panionios Forthnet			4th of 6 teams	(Greece) Aris TT Bank			
2005–06	Aris TT Bank			1st of 6 teams	(Greece) Panionios Forthnet	(France) Adecco ASVEL	(Serbia and Montenegro) Hemofarm	(Russia) Dynamo Moscow
2006–07	AEK			6th of 6 teams				
2006–07	PAOK			4th of 6 teams	(Italy) Montepaschi Siena			
2007–08	Panionios Forthnet		3rd of 6 teams	(Spain) Pamesa Valencia				
2007–08	Panellinios		6th of 6 teams					
2008–09	Maroussi Costa Coffee			1st of 4 teams	3rd of 4 teams			
2008–09	Aris			3rd of 4 teams				
2008–09	Panellinios	(Germany) Telekom Baskets Bonn	(Ukraine) Kyiv	2nd of 4 teams	4th of 4 teams			
2009–10	Aris			1st of 4 teams	2nd of 4 teams	(Spain) Power Electronics Valencia		
2009–10	Panellinios		(Latvia) VEF Rīga	1st of 4 teams	2nd of 4 teams	(Spain) Gran Canaria 2014	(Spain) Power Electronics Valencia	(Spain) Bizkaia Bilbao Basket (4th)
2010–11	Aris		(Bulgaria) Lukoil Academic	1st of 4 teams	4th of 4 teams			
2010–11	Panellinios			1st of 4 teams	3rd of 4 teams			
2010–11	PAOK			3rd of 4 teams				
2011–12	Aris			2nd of 4 teams	4th of 4 teams			
2011–12	PAOK			4th of 4 teams				
2012–13	Panionios			4th of 4 teams				
2013–14	Panionios		2nd of 6 teams	4th of 4 teams				
2013–14	PAOK		4th of 6 teams					
2014–15	PAOK		2nd of 6 teams	4th of 4 teams				
2015–16	PAOK		3rd of 6 teams	4th of 4 teams				
2015–16	Aris		1st of 6 teams	3rd of 4 teams				
2015–16	AEK		5th of 6 teams					
2020–21	Promitheas Patras			6th of 6 teams				

== Greek clubs in FIBA Europe Cup (second-tier) 2015/16 – present ==
=== Achievements ===
FIBA Europe Cup
Rank	Club		Silver medal	SF	QF
1.	PAOK	0	2	0	0
2.	Iraklis	0	0	0	1

=== Appearances ===
Rank	Club	Appearances	Years
1.	Iraklis	2	2021, 2022
2.	Aris	2	2019, 2023
3.	PAOK	2	2025, 2026
4.	Peristeri	2	2022, 2025
5.	Lavrio	1	2019
6.	Ionikos Nikaias	1	2022
7.	Maroussi	1	2025

=== Season to season ===
Year	Team	Progress	Opponents
2018-19	Lavrio	First qualifying round	(Ukraine) Dnipro
2018-19	Aris	Regular Season	Group
2020-21	Iraklis	Quarter-finals	(Israel) Ironi Nes Ziona
2022–23	Aris	First qualifying round	(Lithuania) Wolves
2024–25	PAOK	Runner's-up	(Spain) Bilbao Basket
2025–26	PAOK	Runner's-up	(Spain) Bilbao Basket

== Greek clubs in FIBA Korać Cup (third-tier) 1972–2001/02 ==
=== Achievements ===
FIBA Korać Cup
Rank	Club		Silver medal	SF	QF
1.	Aris	1	0	1	1
2.	PAOK	1	0	0	0
3.	Panionios	0	0	2	3
4.	Maroussi	0	0	1	1
5.	Peristeri	0	0	0	3

=== Appearances ===
Rank	Club	Appearances	Years
1.	Panionios	16	1976, 1977, 1978, 1979, 1985, 1986, 1987, 1988, 1989, 1990, 1991, 1993, 1994, 1995, 1996, 1999
2.	AEK	14	1974, 1976, 1978, 1980, 1981, 1983, 1984, 1985, 1986, 1991, 1992, 1993, 1994, 1996
3.	Aris	12	1975, 1977, 1978, 1981, 1982, 1983, 1985, 1995, 1996, 1997, 1998, 2000
4.	PAOK	11	1975, 1976, 1982, 1984, 1986, 1987, 1988, 1989, 1994, 1997, 2002
5.	Iraklis	10	1977, 1982, 1983, 1984, 1986, 1988, 1990, 1991, 1992, 1993
6.	Panathinaikos	7	1977, 1979, 1988, 1989, 1990, 1991, 1992
7.	Peristeri	7	1992, 1993, 1994, 1995, 1997, 1998, 1999
8.	Olympiacos	6	1980, 1982, 1983, 1984, 1987, 1989
9.	Panellinios	5	1975, 1976, 1978, 1979, 1981
10.	Sporting	4	1980, 1981, 1996, 1997
11.	HAN Thessaloniki	3	1973, 1974, 1975
12.	Maroussi	3	1979, 2000, 2002
13.	Apollon Patras	3	1987, 1990, 1999
14.	Ionikos Nikaias	2	1980, 1985
14.	Papagou	2	1998, 1999
16.	Near East	2	2000, 2001
17.	Irakleio	1	1999

=== Season to season ===
Year	Team	_______ Earlier stage _______	________ Last 64 to 48 ________	________ Last 24 to 32 ________	________ Last 12 to 16 ________	_________ Last 6 to 8 _________	_________ Semifinals _________	____________ Final ____________
1973	YMCA Thessaloniki				3rd of 3 teams			
1973–74	AEK		(Israel) Hapoel Tel Aviv	(Belgium) Standard Liège	3rd of 3 teams			
1973–74	YMCA Thessaloniki		(Austria) Soma Wien	(Socialist Federal Republic of Yugoslavia) Partizan				
1974–75	Aris			(Bulgaria) Levski-Spartak				
1974–75	PAOK			(Socialist Federal Republic of Yugoslavia) Bosna				
1974–75	YMCA Thessaloniki		(West Germany) Wolfenbüttel					
1974–75	Panellinios		(Belgium) Sunair Oostende					
1975–76	AEK			(Israel) Hapoel Tel Aviv				
1975–76	PAOK			(France) Moderne				
1975–76	Panionios		(Belgium) Éveil Monceau					
1975–76	Panellinios		(Socialist Federal Republic of Yugoslavia) Jugoplastika					
1976–77	Aris			(Italy) IBP Stella Azzurra				
1976–77	Panathinaikos		(Belgium) Standard Liège					
1976–77	Iraklis Thessaloniki		(Socialist Federal Republic of Yugoslavia) Bosna					
1976–77	Panionios			(Italy) Alco Bologna				
1977–78	Panionios			(Poland) Resovia Rzeszów				
1977–78	Aris			(France) Moderne				
1977–78	Panellinios			(Italy) Scavolini Pesaro				
1977–78	AEK			(West Germany) 1.FC Bamberg	4th of 4 teams			
1978–79	Panathinaikos			(France) Orthez				
1978–79	Panellinios		(Belgium) Verviers-Pepinster					
1978–79	Panionios		(Switzerland) Pully					
1978–79	Maroussi		(Austria) Milde Sorte Wien					
1979–80	Olympiacos				2nd of 4 teams			
1979–80	AEK			(West Germany) Wolfenbüttel				
1979–80	Sporting		(West Germany) Bayreuth					
1979–80	Ionikos Nikaias		(Switzerland) Nyon					
1980–81	Aris			(Hungary) Vasas	4th of 4 teams			
1980–81	Sporting			(Socialist Federal Republic of Yugoslavia) Crvena zvezda				
1980–81	AEK			(Belgium) Standard Liège				
1980–81	Panellinios		(Israel) Hapoel Haifa					
1981–82	Olympiacos		(Belgium) Maes Pils					
1981–82	Aris			(France) Limoges CSP				
1981–82	Iraklis Thessaloniki		(Italy) Latte Sole Bologna					
1981–82	PAOK		(Austria) Stock 84 Wels	(Socialist Federal Republic of Yugoslavia) Zadar				
1982–83	Aris		(Israel) Hapoel Jerusalem	(Italy) Banco di Roma				
1982–83	Iraklis Thessaloniki		(Italy) Carrera Venezia					
1982–83	AEK		(Italy) Latte Sole Bologna					
1982–83	Olympiacos		(Netherlands) Elmex Leiden					
1983–84	PAOK			(Belgium) Toptours Aarschot	4th of 4 teams			
1983–84	AEK		(Luxembourg) Soleuvre	(France) Orthez				
1983–84	Olympiacos			(Spain) CAI Zaragoza				
1983–84	Iraklis Thessaloniki		(West Germany) Giants Osnabrück					
1984–85	Aris		(Bulgaria) Levski-Spartak	(Socialist Federal Republic of Yugoslavia) Zadar	1st of 4 teams	Bye	(Italy) Ciaocrem Varese	
1984–85	Panionios		(Cyprus) Keravnos	(Italy) Ciaocrem Varese				
1984–85	AEK			(Spain) Clesa Ferrol				
1984–85	Ionikos Nikaias		(Israel) Hapoel Haifa					
1985–86	PAOK		(Bulgaria) Levski-Spartak	(Belgium) Standard Liège	4th of 4 teams			
1985–86	Panionios		(Belgium) Renault Gent	(Socialist Federal Republic of Yugoslavia) Zadar				
1985–86	Iraklis Thessaloniki		(Bulgaria) Spartak Pleven					
1985–86	AEK		(Hungary) MAFC	(France) ESM Challans				
1986–87	Olympiacos			(Belgium) Assubel Mariembourg				
1986–87	Panionios		(Cyprus) AEL Limassol	(Italy) Berloni Torino				
1986–87	PAOK		(Bulgaria) CSKA Sofia	(Socialist Federal Republic of Yugoslavia) Partizan				
1986–87	Apollon Patras		(Israel) Hapoel Tel Aviv					
1987–88	Panionios		(England) Manchester United					
1987–88	PAOK			(France) Olympique Antibes	4th of 4 teams			
1987–88	Panathinaikos		(Israel) Hapoel Haifa					
1987–88	Iraklis Thessaloniki		(Bulgaria) Spartak Pleven	(Spain) Estudiantes Todagrés				
1988–89	PAOK		(France) ASVEL	(Socialist Federal Republic of Yugoslavia) Crvena zvezda				
1988–89	Panionios		(Socialist Federal Republic of Yugoslavia) Smelt Olimpija					
1988–89	Panathinaikos		(Israel) Hapoel Holon	(Italy) Divarese Varese				
1988–89	Olympiacos		(Poland) Górnik Wałbrzych	(Soviet Union) Dinamo Tbilisi	4th of 4 teams			
1989–90	Panathinaikos		(Israel) Hapoel Holon					
1989–90	Panionios		(Cyprus) Pezoporikos Larnaca	(West Germany) TTL Bamberg	2nd of 4 teams	(Soviet Union) CSKA Moscow		
1989–90	Iraklis Thessaloniki		(Socialist Federal Republic of Yugoslavia) Crvena zvezda	(Turkey) Paşabahçe	4th of 4 teams			
1989–90	Apollon Patras		(Israel) Hapoel Tel Aviv					
1990–91	Panionios		(Romania) Universitatea Cluj	(Italy) Panasonic Reggio Calabria	3rd of 4 teams			
1990–91	Iraklis Thessaloniki		(Germany) EnBW Ludwigsburg	(Soviet Union) VEF Rīga	4th of 4 teams			
1990–91	Panathinaikos		(Czechoslovakia) Sparta Praha	(France) Olympique Antibes	3rd of 4 teams			
1990–91	AEK		(Sweden) Alvik	(Italy) Phonola Caserta				
1991–92	Iraklis Thessaloniki		(Czechoslovakia) Baník Handlová	(Spain) Collado Villalba	4th of 4 teams			
1991–92	AEK			(Hungary) Videoton	3rd of 4 teams			
1991–92	Nikas Peristeri		(Austria) Toshiba Klosterneuburg	(Federal Republic of Yugoslavia) Bosna	4th of 4 teams			
1991–92	Panathinaikos		(France) Saint-Quentin	(Federal Republic of Yugoslavia) Vojvodina	4th of 4 teams			
1992–93	Fyrogenis AEK		(Czechoslovakia) Sparta Praha	(France) Gravelines				
1992–93	Chipita Panionios		(Bulgaria) Levski Sofia	(Czechoslovakia) Nová huť ANES Ostrava	2nd of 4 teams	(Italy) Philips Milano		
1992–93	Replay Iraklis		(Cyprus) Keravnos	(Latvia) VEF Adazhi Interlatvia Rīga	3rd of 4 teams			
1992–93	Nikas Peristeri		(Cyprus) APOEL	(Ukraine) Stroitel Kharkov	3rd of 4 teams			
1993–94	PAOK Bravo			(Russia) Stroitel Samara	1st of 4 teams	(Italy) Scavolini Pesaro	(Greece) Chipita Panionios	(Italy) Stefanel Trieste
1993–94	Chipita Panionios		(Slovenia) Slovenica Koper	(Cyprus) Pezoporikos Larnaca	2nd of 4 teams	(Israel) Maccabi Elite Tel Aviv	(Greece) PAOK Bravo	
1993–94	AEK	(Cyprus) Keravnos	(Israel) Hapoel Jerusalem					
1993–94	Nikas Peristeri		(Belgium) Spirou Charleroi	(France) PSG Racing	2nd of 4 teams	(Italy) Stefanel Trieste		
1994–95	Chipita Panionios		(Lithuania) Policijos Akademija	(Israel) Maccabi Rishon LeZion	1st of 4 teams	(Italy) Stefanel Milano		
1994–95	Nikas Peristeri		(Hungary) MOL Szolnok	(Russia) CSK VVS Samara	4th of 4 teams			
1994–95	Aris Intersalonika		(Poland) Polonia Warsawa	(Russia) Dynamo Moscow				
1995–96	Panionios Afisorama		(Germany) Steiner Bayreuth	(Federal Republic of Yugoslavia) Borovica	3rd of 4 teams			
1995–96	Aris Moda bagno		(Hungary) MOL Szolnok	(Poland) Stal Bobrek Bytom	3rd of 4 teams			
1995–96	Soulis Sporting	(Cyprus) AEK Larnaca	(Belgium) Dexia Mons-Hainaut	(France) Pitch Cholet	4th of 4 teams			
1995–96	AEK		(Austria) Einkaufswelt Fürstenfeld	(Lithuania) Šilutė	4th of 4 teams			
1996–97	PAOK		1st of 4 teams	(Federal Republic of Yugoslavia) Crvena zvezda	(Italy) Benetton Treviso			
1996–97	Aris		1st of 4 teams	(Turkey) Beşiktaş	(Federal Republic of Yugoslavia) Beobanka	(Greece) Nikas Peristeri	(Italy) Benetton Treviso	(Turkey) Tofaş
1996–97	Soulis Sporting		1st of 4 teams	(Israel) Maccabi Rishon LeZion	(Italy) Telemarket Roma			
1996–97	Nikas Peristeri		1st of 4 teams	(Italy) Cagiva Varese	(Spain) Taugrés	(Greece) Aris		
1997–98	Peristeri 3Bit		2nd of 4 teams	(Spain) León Caja España	(Federal Republic of Yugoslavia) Budućnost	(Italy) Mash Jeans Verona		
1997–98	Aris Moda bagno		1st of 4 teams	(Spain) TDK Manresa	(Latvia) Ventspils	(Italy) Calze Pompea Roma		
1997–98	Sporting		4th of 4 teams					
1997–98	Papagou Katselis		2nd of 4 teams	(Germany) TTL UniVersa Bamberg	(Turkey) Kombassan Konya			
1998–99	Panionios		1st of 4 teams	(Italy) Zucchetti Reggiana	(Federal Republic of Yugoslavia) Radnički Belgrade	(France) JDA Dijon	(Spain) FC Barcelona	
1998–99	Apollon Patras		2nd of 4 teams	(Israel) Maccabi Rishon LeZion	(France) JDA Dijon			
1998–99	Iraklio Minoan Lines		2nd of 4 teams	(Russia) Arsenal Tula				
1998–99	Papagou		2nd of 4 teams	(Lithuania) Šiauliai				
1999–00	Aris		1st of 3 teams	(Belgium) Sunair Oostende	(Turkey) Türk Telekom			
1999–00	Maroussi		2nd of 4 teams	(Sweden) Magic M7	(Israel) Hapoel Galil Elyon	(Spain) Unicaja		
1999–00	Near East		2nd of 3 teams	(Greece) Nikas Peristeri				
1999–00	Nikas Peristeri		1st of 4 teams	(Greece) Near East	(Spain) Adecco Estudiantes			
2000–01	Near East		(Cyprus) Achilleas Kaimakli	1st of 4 teams	(Italy) Telit Trieste			
2001–02	Maroussi Telestet		(Bosnia and Herzegovina) Feal Široki	1st of 4 teams	(Federal Republic of Yugoslavia) Hemofarm	(Spain) Jabones Pardo Fuenlabrada	(Russia) Lokomotiv Mineralnye Vody	
2001–02	PAOK		(Cyprus) Apollon Limassol	3rd of 4 teams				

== Greek clubs in FIBA EuroChallenge (third-tier) 2003/04 – 2014/15 ==
=== Achievements ===
FIBA EuroChallenge
Rank	Club		Silver medal	SF	QF
1.	Maroussi	0	1	0	1
2.	Panionios	0	0	0	1

=== Appearances ===
Rank	Club	Appearances	Years
1.	Maroussi	4	2004, 2006, 2007, 2008
2.	Olympia Larissa	3	2005, 2008, 2009
3.	PAOK	2	2006, 2008
4.	Aris	1	2004
5.	Peristeri	1	2004
6.	Ionikos N.F.	1	2005
7.	Iraklis	1	2005
8.	Panionios	1	2007
9.	AEK	1	2008
10.	Olympias Patras	1	2008

=== Season to season ===
Year	Team	Progress	Opponents
2003–04	Maroussi TIM	Runner's up	(Russia) UNICS
2003–04	Aris	Quarter-finals	(Greece) Maroussi TIM
2003–04	Peristeri	Regular season	Group
2004–05	Ionikos N.F.	Regular season	Group
2004–05	Iraklis	Regular season	Group
2004–05	Olympia Larissa	Regular season	Group
2005–06	Maroussi	Quarter-finals	(Russia) Dynamo Saint Petersburg
2005–06	PAOK	Regular season	Group
2006–07	Maroussi	Top 16	Group
2006–07	Panionios	Quarter-finals	(Spain) Akasvayu Girona
2007–08	PAOK	Regular season	Group
2007–08	Olympia Larissa	Regular season	Group
2007–08	Maroussi	Elimination round 2	(Russia) Spartak Saint Petersburg
2007–08	AEK	Elimination round 2	(France) Cholet
2007–08	Olympias Patras	Elimination round 2	(Russia) Ural Great Perm
2008–09	Olympia Larissa	Regular season	Group
2009–10
2010–11
2011–12
2012–13
2013–14
2014–15

== See also ==
European basketball clubs in European and worldwide competitions:

- Croatia
- Czechoslovakia
- France
- Israel
- Italy
- Russia
- Spain
- Turkey
- USSR
- Yugoslavia
