= Arthur Kenney (basketball) =

American basketball player

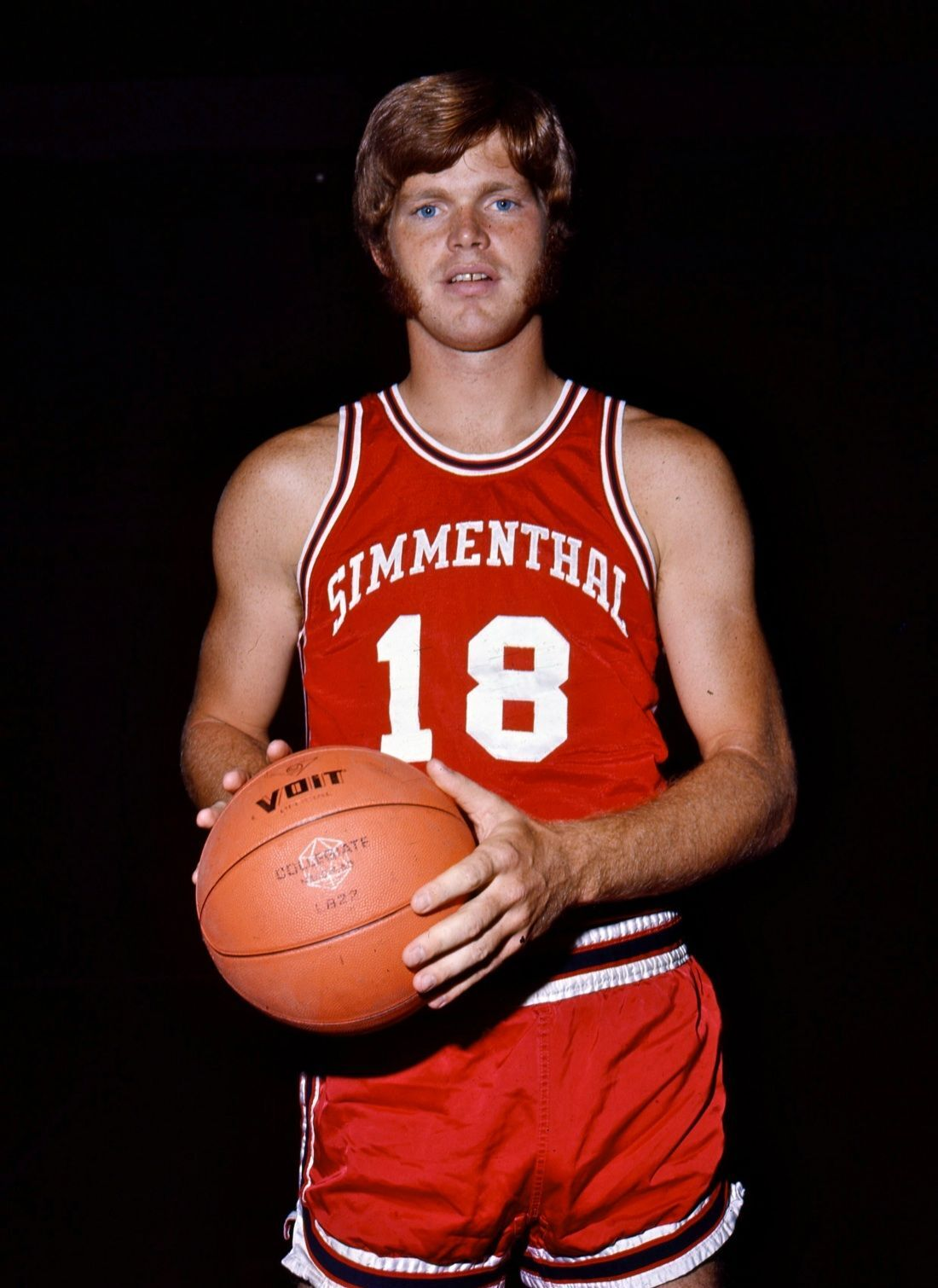
- Kenney with Olimpia Milano in the early 1970s

Personal information
- Born: March 5, 1946 (age 80) New York City, New York, U.S.
- Listed height: 6 ft 8.5 in (2.04 m)

Career information
- High school: Power Memorial Academy (New York City, New York)
- College: Fairfield (1965–1968)
- Playing career: 1968–1976
- Position: Power forward / center
- Number: 18

Career history
- 1968–1970: Le Mans
- 1970–1973: Olimpia Milano
- 1973–1975: Le Mans
- 1975–1976: Partenope Napoli

Career highlights
- 2× FIBA Saporta Cup champion (1971, 1972); FIBA Saporta Cup Finals Top Scorer (1972); Italian Cup winner (1972); Italian League champion (1972); No. 18 retired by Olimpia Milano (2013)
- Stats at Basketball Reference

Arthur Kenney (born March 5, 1946) is a retired American professional basketball player. He played at the power forward and center positions, and was nicknamed "The Great Red".

== High school ==
Kenney played high school basketball at Power Memorial Academy (PMA), in Manhattan, New York City. At Power Memorial, he was a teammate of Lew Alcindor (later known as Kareem Abdul-Jabbar). The team's head coach was Jack Donohue, and its assistant coach was Dick Percudani.

In May 2000, Kenney's high school senior season team of 1963–64, was named "The Best High School Team in American History", by the National Sportswriters Association, and it was inducted into the Catholic High School Athletic Association's Hall of Fame as, "The Team of the Century".

== College career ==
Kenney played college basketball at Fairfield University, with the Fairfield Stags, from 1964 to 1968. He was inducted into the Fairfield University Hall of Fame in 1996.

== Professional career ==
For his pro career, Kenney moved to France, where he played with the LNB Pro A club Le Mans, from 1968 to 1970. He then moved to Italy, where he played with the Italian League club Olimpia Milano, from 1970 to 1973. With Milano, he won the FIBA Saporta Cup title in the 1970–71 and 1971–72 seasons. He also won the Italian Cup and the Italian League championship with Milano, during the 1971–72 season.

He then returned to Le Mans, where he played from 1973 to 1975. He played with the Italian Second Division club Partenope Napoli, during the 1975–76 season. In 2013, Olimpia Milano retired his number 18 jersey.

== Post-playing career ==
After he ended his basketball playing career, Kenney went into coaching, and then eventually began a career working on Wall Street.
