= BC Dinamo Tbilisi in international competitions =

BC Dinamo Tbilisi history and statistics in FIBA Europe and Euroleague Basketball (company) competitions.

== European competitions ==
Record	Round	Opponent club		
1959–60 FIBA European Champions Cup 1st–tier
4–4	2nd round	(Romania) Steaua București	83–87 (a)	90–68 (h)
4–4	QF	(Bulgaria) Academic	76–64 (h)	69–72 (a)
4–4	SF	(Poland) Polonia Warszawa	88–65 (h)	64–61 (a)
4–4	F	(Soviet Union) Rīgas ASK	51–61, May 10, Dinamo Stadion, Tbilisi; 62–69, May 15, Daugava Stadion, Rīga	
1961–62 FIBA European Champions Cup 1st–tier
7–0	2nd round	(Romania) Steaua București	77–76 (a)	82–77 (h)
7–0	QF	(Turkey) Darüşşafaka	80–67 (a)	84–49 (h)
7–0	SF	(Soviet Union) CSKA Moscow	75–71 (a)	77–66 (h)
7–0	F	(Spain) Real Madrid	90–83; April 1, Patinoire des Vernets, Geneva	
1962–63 FIBA European Champions Cup 1st–tier
1–3	2nd round	Bye	Dinamo Tbilisi qualified without games	
1–3	QF	(Italy) Simmenthal Milano	65–70 (h)	74–68 (a)
1–3	SF	(Soviet Union) CSKA Moscow	59–76 (h)	78–79 (a)
1968–69 FIBA European Cup Winners' Cup 2nd–tier
3–2	2nd round	Bye	Dinamo Tbilisi qualified without games	
3–2	QF	(Bulgaria) Levski-Spartak	88–83 (a)	58–54 (h)
3–2	SF	(Greece) Panathinaikos	67–81 (a)	103–71 (h)
3–2	F	(Czechoslovakia) Slavia VŠ Praha	74–80; April 17, Wiener Stadthalle, Vienna	
1969–70 FIBA European Cup Winners' Cup 2nd–tier
2–2	2nd round	Bye	Dinamo Tbilisi qualified without games	
2–2	QF	(Poland) Polonia Warszawa	82–77 (a)	92–82 (h)
2–2	SF	(Italy) Fides Napoli	69–86 (a)	83–88 (h)
1988–89 FIBA Korać Cup 3rd–tier
1–1	1st round	Bye	Dinamo Tbilisi qualified without games	
1–1	2nd round	(Greece) Olympiacos	75–96 (h)	113–93 (a)
1992–93 FIBA European League 1st–tier
0–2	1st round	(Poland) Śląsk Wrocław	85–124 (h)	95–113 (a)
1996–97 FIBA Korać Cup 3rd–tier
0–2	1st round	(Lithuania) Olimpas	73–80 (h)	60–79 (a)
