= Near East B.C. in international competitions =

Near East B.C. in international competitions is the history and statistics of Near East B.C. in FIBA Europe and Euroleague Basketball Company competitions.

== European competitions ==
Record	Round	Opponent club		
1999–00 FIBA Korać Cup 3rd–tier
2–4	1st round	Bye	Near East qualified without games	
2–4	2nd round	(Turkey) Pınar Karşıyaka	73–79 (a)	79–70 (h)
2–4	2nd round	(Slovenia) Slovan	75–71 (h)	66–91 (a)
2–4	2nd round	(Federal Republic of Yugoslavia) Spartak Subotica	Spartak Subotica withdrew without games	
2–4	3rd round	(Greece) Nikas Peristeri	73–80 (h)	63–66 (a)
2000–01 FIBA Korać Cup 3rd–tier
7–3	2nd round	(Cyprus) Achilleas	106–70 (a)	92–60 (h)
7–3	3rd round	(Italy) Montecatini	78–76 (a)	104–101 (h)
7–3	3rd round	(Israel) Maccabi Ironi Ramat Gan	75–80 (a)	72–71 (h)
7–3	3rd round	(Bosnia and Herzegovina) Sloboda Dita	68–64 (h)	62–92 (a)
7–3	Top 16	(Italy) Telit Trieste	74–85 (a)	93–88 (h)

== See also ==
- Greek basketball clubs in international competitions
