= Napoli Basket =

Napoli Basket may refer to:

- Napoli Basket (2016), professional basketball team
- S.S. Basket Napoli (1946-2009), professional basketball team
- Partenope Napoli Basket, amateur basketball team
