= Habib Ademi =

Kosovan basketball player

Personal information
- Born: 1 April 1970 (age 56) Pristina, Yugoslavia
- Listed height: 6 ft 9 in (2.06 m)
- Listed weight: 220 lb (100 kg)

Career information
- College: Southern Indiana (1998–2000)
- Playing career: 1992–2009
- Position: Center

Career history

Playing
- 1992–1997: Krško
- 2000–2003: JA Vichy
- 2003–2005: Mabetex
- 2006–2007: Prishtina
- 2007–2009: Nova Gorica

Coaching
- 2016–2017: Alberta Golden Bears (assistant)

Career highlights
- As player: 2× Kosovo League champion (2005, 2006); Kosovo Cup winner (2007); Pro B champion (2002); Slovenian Second League champion (1994, 2008)

Habib Ademi (born 1 April 1970) is a Kosovan former professional basketball player and basketball coach. In 2006, he was selected the Sportsman of the Year in Kosovo.
