= PalaArgento =

Coordinates: 40°49′16″N 14°10′44″E

- Interactive map of PalaArgento
- Location: Naples, Italy
- Owner: City of Naples
- Capacity: 8,000 for Basketball

Construction
- Opened: 1963
- Closed: 1998
- Demolished: 2005

Tenant
- Partenope Napoli

PalaArgento (Italian pronunciation: [ˌpala.arˈdʒento]), full name Palazzetto dello Sport Mario Argento, was an indoor sporting arena in Naples, Italy. Built in 1963, the capacity of the arena was 8,000 spectators. It was the home arena of the Partenope Napoli basketball team of the Lega Basket Serie A.

During its lifespan, the arena hosted concerts from numerous bands including Genesis in 1974 and A-ha in 1988. The arena closed in 1998, initially for repairs which were cancelled due to cost overruns. Instead, the arena was replaced by PalaBarbuto in 2003 and PalaArgento was demolished in 2005.
