= Miles Aiken =

American basketball player

Personal information
- Born: December 27, 1941 (age 84) New York City, New York, U.S.
- Listed height: 6 ft 6 in (1.98 m)
- Listed weight: 210 lb (95 kg)

Career information
- High school: George Washington (New York City, New York)
- College: St. Bonaventure (1961–1964)
- NBA draft: 1964: undrafted
- Playing career: 1965–1970
- Position: Power forward / center

Career history
- 1965–1966: Águilas Escolapios Schuss de Bilbao
- 1966–1969: Real Madrid
- 1969–1970: Fides Napoli

Career highlights
- 2× EuroLeague champion (1967, 1968); 2× Spanish League champion (1968, 1969); Spanish Cup winner (1967); Spanish League Top Scorer (1966)

Miles Aiken (born December 27, 1941) is an American former professional basketball player, coach of the British Olympic basketball team, and sportscaster of basketball and American football.

He was a center in college for St. Bonaventure University in the 1960s, and averaged over 23 points a game before suffering a knee injury. After college, he played as a power forward in the EuroLeague. There, he won two championships with Real Madrid. He also won the FIBA Saporta Cup with Partenope Napoli.

Aiken coached the British Olympic basketball team in the 1970s, and later became a sportscaster of basketball and American football.

== Early life ==
Aiken was born in New York City. He grew up in the neighborhood of Harlem in the New York City borough of Manhattan, playing basketball in its playgrounds.

== College career ==
Aiken attended St. Bonaventure University in New York State, and played center for their basketball team. He averaged more than 20 points a game on the school's freshman squad in 1960–61.

As a sophomore, he started for the Bonnies, and averaged 23.6 points and 11.0 rebounds per game. By December 1961, he was rated one of the outstanding prospects in the United States. On December 16, 1961, he broke Elgin Baylor's Bluegrass invitational basketball tournament record by scoring 58 points in two games. On February 13, 1962, he was named to the weekly major college All-East Basketball Team by the Eastern College Athletic Conference. Aiken averaged 23 points per game in his first two years of varsity play.

In early 1963, after averaging 23 points per game and 14 rebounds per game in 10 games, he injured his left knee in a game against Duquesne University. He underwent surgery, and was sidelined for a good portion of the year.

== Professional career ==
When he was not drafted in the 1964 NBA draft, Aiken went to Europe to play basketball. He used a brace on his injured knee.

Aiken played for Águilas Escolapios Schuss de Bilbao (Spain) in 1965–66, and was the top scorer in the Primera División. He also played for the Newcastle Eagles in 1965–66 under Spanish coach Antonio Diaz Miguel, and led the National League in scoring with 23.9 points per game.

He then played for Real Madrid in the late 1960s, leading them to two consecutive EuroLeague titles in 1967 and 1968. In 1967, he led his team with 31 points in its semifinal win over Olimpija, 88–86, and he had 23 points in the EuroLeague Final to help Real Madrid beat Simmenthal Milano. In 1968, in the title game he led all scorers with 26 points to lead Real Madrid to the title against Spartak Brno, 98–95. In the 1969 European Cup final CSKA Moscow beat Real Madrid in double overtime, as he led Madrid with 24 points.

He joined Partenope Napoli that summer and led it to the 1970 Saporta Cup title, over JDA Dijon Basket. Jet magazine noted that he was one of four blacks in the European finals, along with Rudy Bennett (New York University), Larry Robertson (Oklahoma University), and Jim Williams (Temple University). Concurrently with playing for the team, he coached, and earned a long-distance teaching degree at the University of Southern California. He worked in England as a teacher after completing his studies.

On February 3, 2008, Aiken was among 105 players nominated for the 50 Greatest EuroLeague Contributors list.

== Career after basketball ==
In October 1975, he became Britain's Olympic basketball team coach. He coached the British Olympic team in 1976.

Aiken later moved into business and sports commentating. In 1982, he began hosting broadcasts of British basketball games, becoming the first black sports presenter on British television. The Boston Globe wrote in 1984 that he "has probably done more than anyone to stimulate interest for basketball in Britain, just by force of his personality."

He covered American football with Nicky Horne in the 1980s. In 1983, he covered the Super Bowl for Britain's independent Channel Four, London, with the broadcast attracting two million British viewers.

=== Writing ===
Aiken co-authored the Channel 4 Basketball Guide with Philip Linton (Statmill, 1983). He also co-authored American Football: The Records with Peter Rowe (Guinness Books, 1989), which covers the history of football, the development of high school and college football and the National Football League, and football in Canada and Europe.

== See also ==
- EuroLeague Finals Top Scorers
