= Giovanni Gavagnin =

Italian basketball player and coach (1936–2013)

Personal information
- Born: 15 September 1936 Portogruaro, Italy
- Died: 3 March 2013 (aged 76) Caserta, Italy
- Listed height: 6 ft 6.75 in (2.00 m)
- Listed weight: 208 lb (94 kg)

Career information
- Playing career: 1960–1976
- Position: Center
- Coaching career: 1965–2006

Career history

Playing
- 1960–1967: Varese
- 1967–1970: Partenope
- 1970–1975: Varese
- 1975–1976: Juvecaserta

Coaching
- 1965–1966: Varese
- 1967–1968: Partenope
- 1975–1976: Juvecaserta
- 1978–1980: Juvecaserta
- 2004–2006: Pantere Basket Femminile (assistant)

Career highlights
- As player: 2× FIBA Intercontinental Cup champion (1966, 1970); FIBA Saporta Cup champion (1970); 2× Italian League champion (1961, 1964); Italian Cup winner (1968); Italian Basketball Hall of Fame (2009)

Giovanni Angelo Gavagnin (15 September 1936 – 3 March 2013) was an Italian professional basketball player and coach. In 2009, he was inducted into the Italian Basketball Hall of Fame.

== Club career ==
During his pro club career, Gavagnin won the 1969–70 season's FIBA Saporta Cup championship.

== National team career ==
Gavagnin was a part of the senior Italian national basketball teams that finished in fourth and fifth place at the 1960 and 1964 Summer Olympics, respectively.
