= 1970–71 FIBA European Cup Winners' Cup =

- League: FIBA European Cup Winners' Cup
- Sport: Basketball

Finals
- Champions: (Italy) Simmenthal Milano
- Runners-up: (Soviet Union) Spartak Leningrad

FIBA European Cup Winners' Cup seasons
- ← 1969–70 1971–72 →

The 1970–71 FIBA European Cup Winners' Cup was the fifth edition of FIBA's 2nd-tier level European-wide professional club basketball competition, contested between national domestic cup champions, running from 3 December 1970, to 7 April 1971. It was contested by 26 teams, six more than in the previous edition.

Italy became the first country to win the competition twice in a row, as the 1966 FIBA European Cup champion, Simmenthal Milano, defeated Spartak Leningrad, in the last of the competition's three two-legged finals. It previously defeated defending champion, Fides Napoli, in the semifinals, in the competition's first tie between two clubs from the same country. Olimpia Milano was the third Italian League club to win the FIBA Cup Winners' Cup, after Ignis Varese, and Fides Napoli.

== Participants ==
Country	Teams	Clubs	
Italy	2	Simmenthal Milano	Fides Napoli
Albania	1	17 Nëntori Tirana	
Austria	1	WSG Radenthein	
Belgium	1	Racing Bell Mechelen	
Bulgaria	1	Balkan Botevgrad	
Czechoslovakia	1	Dukla Olomouc	
Finland	1	NMKY Helsinki	
France	1	JA Vichy	
Greece	1	Panathinaikos	
Hungary	1	Soproni MAFC	
Iceland	1	KR	
Israel	1	Hapoel Tel Aviv	
Luxembourg	1	Arantia Larochette	
Morocco	1	MEC	
Netherlands	1	Flamingo's Haarlem	
Poland	1	Legia Warsaw	
Portugal	1	Porto	
Romania	1	Steaua București	
Scotland	1	Boroughmuir	
Soviet Union	1	Spartak Leningrad	
Spain	1	Juventud Nerva	
Sweden	1	Helsingborg	
Turkey	1	Galatasaray	
West Germany	1	VfL Osnabrück	
(Socialist Federal Republic of Yugoslavia) Yugoslavia	1	Zadar	

== First round ==
Team 1	Agg.	Team 2	1st leg	2nd leg
Flamingo's Haarlem (Netherlands)	158–171	(Czechoslovakia) Dukla Olomouc	92–58	66–113
Zadar (Socialist Federal Republic of Yugoslavia)	145–122	(Albania) 17 Nëntori Tirana	73–60	72–62
Galatasaray (Turkey)	130–133	(Romania) Steaua București	66–61	64–72
NMKY Helsinki (Finland)	152–165	(Bulgaria) Balkan Botevgrad	83–80	69–85
Porto (Portugal)	112–149	(France) JA Vichy	56–60	56–89
Juventud Nerva (Spain)	198–141	(Scotland) Boroughmuir	106–64	92–77
WSG Radenthein (Austria)	154–159	(Hungary) Soproni MAFC	80–80	74–79
KR (Iceland)	125–210	(Poland) Legia Warsaw	67–99	58–111
MEC (Morocco)	100–230	(Italy) Simmenthal Milano	61–105	39–125
Arantia Larochette (Luxembourg)	133–214	(Belgium) Racing Bell Mechelen	85–106	48–108
Panathinaikos (Greece)	178–125	(West Germany) VfL Osnabrück	89–52	89–73

== Second round ==
Team 1	Agg.	Team 2	1st leg	2nd leg
Dukla Olomouc (Czechoslovakia)	146–151	(Socialist Federal Republic of Yugoslavia) Zadar	85–85	61–66
Spartak Leningrad (Soviet Union)	180–131	(Romania) Steaua București	93–54	87–77
Balkan Botevgrad (Bulgaria)	142–118	(France) JA Vichy	82–50	60–68
Juventud Nerva (Spain)	176–128	(Hungary) Soproni MAFC	95–57	81–71
Legia Warsaw (Poland)	163–158	(Sweden) Helsingborg	98–70	65–88
Simmenthal Milano (Italy)	171–145	(Belgium) Racing Bell Mechelen	96–74	75–71
Hapoel Tel Aviv (Israel)	146–140	(Greece) Panathinaikos	93–83	53–57

Automatically qualified to the quarter-finals

- (Italy) Fides Napoli (title holder)

== Quarterfinals ==
Team 1	Agg.	Team 2	1st leg	2nd leg
Zadar (Socialist Federal Republic of Yugoslavia)	137–161	(Soviet Union) Spartak Leningrad	59–63	78–98
Balkan Botevgrad (Bulgaria)	147–154	(Spain) Juventud Nerva	88–62	59–92
Legia Warsaw (Poland)	148–180	(Italy) Fides Napoli	75–84	73–96
Simmenthal Milano (Italy)	212–154	(Israel) Hapoel Tel Aviv	107–74	105–80

== Semifinals ==
Team 1	Agg.	Team 2	1st leg	2nd leg
Spartak Leningrad (Soviet Union)	131–114	(Spain) Juventud Nerva	82–52	49–62
Fides Napoli (Italy)	155–167	(Italy) Simmenthal Milano	78–86	77–81

== Finals ==
Team 1	Agg.	Team 2	1st leg	2nd leg
Spartak Leningrad (Soviet Union)	118–127	(Italy) Simmenthal Milano	66–56	52–71

1970–71 FIBA European Cup Winners' Cup Champions

Simmenthal Milano
1st title
