= 1969–70 FIBA European Cup Winners' Cup =

- League: FIBA European Cup Winners' Cup
- Sport: Basketball

Finals
- Champions: (Italy) Fides Napoli
- Runners-up: (France) JA Vichy

FIBA European Cup Winner's Cup seasons
- ← 1968–69 1970–71 →

The 1969–70 FIBA European Cup Winners' Cup was the fourth edition of FIBA's 2nd-tier level European-wide professional club basketball competition, contested between national domestic cup champions, running from 4 December 1969, to 26 April 1970. It was contested by 20 teams, two less than in the two previous editions.

Fides Napoli defeated JA Vichy, in a two-legged final, to become the competition's second Italian League champion.

== Participants ==
Country	Teams	Clubs
Austria	1	WSG Radenthein
Belgium	1	Standard Liège
Bulgaria	1	Levski-Spartak
Czechoslovakia	1	Iskra Svit
Finland	1	Helsingin Kisa-Toverit
France	1	JA Vichy
Greece	1	AEK
Hungary	1	Soproni MAFC
Israel	1	Maccabi Tel Aviv
Italy	1	Fides Napoli
Luxembourg	1	Etzella
Poland	1	Polonia Warsaw
Portugal	1	Benfica
Romania	1	Steaua București
Soviet Union	1	Dinamo Tbilisi
Spain	1	Juventud Nerva
Sweden	1	Solna
Turkey	1	İTÜ
West Germany	1	Gießen 46ers
(Socialist Federal Republic of Yugoslavia) Yugoslavia	1	Lokomotiva

== First round ==
Team 1	Agg.	Team 2	1st leg	2nd leg
Solna (Sweden)	169–228	(Belgium) Standard Liège	79–101	90–127
Etzella (Luxembourg)	102–191	(France) JA Vichy	63–102	39–89
WSG Radenthein (Austria)	157–207	(Spain) Juventud Nerva	87–93	70–114
Benfica (Portugal)	109–222	(Italy) Fides Napoli	54–102	55–120
Gießen 46ers (West Germany)	166–182	(Romania) Steaua București	86–84	81–98

== Second round ==
Team 1	Agg.	Team 2	1st leg	2nd leg
Standard Liège (Belgium)	182–139	(Czechoslovakia) Iskra Svit	101–67	81–72
JA Vichy (France)	144–140	(Bulgaria) Levski-Spartak	66–58	78–81
Juventud Nerva (Spain)	163–149	(Finland) Helsingin Kisa-Toverit	82–63	81–86
AEK (Greece)	190–146	(Hungary) Soproni MAFC	86–49	104–97
Lokomotiva (Socialist Federal Republic of Yugoslavia)	171–164	(Turkey) İTÜ	96–82	75–82
Maccabi Tel Aviv (Israel)	151–173	(Italy) Fides Napoli	89–82	62–91
Polonia Warsaw (Poland)	140–133	(Romania) Steaua București	73–62	67–71

Automatically qualified to the quarter finals

- (Soviet Union) Dinamo Tbilisi

== Quarterfinals ==
Team 1	Agg.	Team 2	1st leg	2nd leg
Standard Liège (Belgium)	148–173	(France) JA Vichy	95–95	53–78
Juventud Nerva (Spain)	133–142	(Greece) AEK	87–68	46–74
Lokomotiva (Socialist Federal Republic of Yugoslavia)	164–191	(Italy) Fides Napoli	80–89	84–102
Polonia Warsaw (Poland)	159–174	(Soviet Union) Dinamo Tbilisi	77–82	82–92

== Semifinals ==
Team 1	Agg.	Team 2	1st leg	2nd leg
JA Vichy (France)	143–134	(Greece) AEK	78–60	65–74
Fides Napoli (Italy)	174–152	(Soviet Union) Dinamo Tbilisi	86–69	88–83

== Finals ==
Team 1	Agg.	Team 2	1st leg	2nd leg
JA Vichy (France)	129–147	(Italy) Fides Napoli	64–60	65–87

1969–70 FIBA European Cup Winners' Cup Champions

Fides Napoli
1st title
