= MEC (basketball) =

Maison d'Enfants Club or simply MEC is a professional basketball club based in the district of Aïn Chock, Casablanca, Morocco.

== Honours & achievements ==
Throne Cup

- Winners (2): 1970, 1971
- Runners-up (1): 1981
