= 1971–72 FIBA European Cup Winners' Cup =

- League: FIBA European Cup Winners' Cup
- Sport: Basketball

Finals
- Champions: (Italy) Simmenthal Milano
- Runners-up: (Socialist Federal Republic of Yugoslavia) Crvena zvezda

FIBA European Cup Winners' Cup seasons
- ← 1970–71 1972–73 →

The 1971–72 FIBA European Cup Winners' Cup was the sixth edition of FIBA's 2nd-tier level European-wide professional club basketball competition, contested between national domestic cup champions, running from 4 November 1971, to 21 March 1972. It was contested by 21 teams, five less than in the previous edition, and it marked a reform in the competition's format; a 6-team group stage was introduced, replacing the quarterfinals.

Defending champion, Simmenthal Milano, defeated Crvena zvezda in the final, which returned to a single game format, to win their second trophy, becoming the first team to successfully defend its title. It was the third title in a row for an Italian League team. This season's FIBA European Champions Cup final, also featured Italian and Yugoslav League teams, with the same outcome.

== Participants ==
Country	Teams	Clubs	
Italy	2	Fides Napoli	Simmenthal Milano
Albania	1	Partizani Tirana	
Austria	1	Handelsministerium	
Belgium	1	Racing Bell Mechelen	
Bulgaria	1	Levski-Spartak	
Czechoslovakia	1	Spartak ZJŠ Brno	
Denmark	1	Gladsaxe	
England	1	Sutton & Crystal Palace	
Finland	1	Helsingin Kisa-Toverit	
France	1	Denain Voltaire	
Greece	1	AEK	
Israel	1	Maccabi Haifa	
Luxembourg	1	Arantia Larochette	
Netherlands	1	Fiat Stars	
Portugal	1	Coimbra	
Spain	1	Juventud Schweppes	
Syria	1	Ghouta	
Turkey	1	Beşiktaş	
West Germany	1	Mainz	
(Socialist Federal Republic of Yugoslavia) Yugoslavia	1	Crvena zvezda	

== First round ==
Team 1	Agg.	Team 2	1st leg	2nd leg
Spartak ZJŠ Brno (Czechoslovakia)	224–150	(Luxembourg) Arantia Larochette	111–65	113–85
Fides Napoli (Italy)	164–120	(West Germany) Mainz	82–49	82–71
Juventud Schweppes (Spain)	4–0*	(Albania) Partizani Tirana	2–0	2–0
Sutton & Crystal Palace (England)	171–118	(Denmark) Gladsaxe	83–68	88–50
Maccabi Haifa (Israel)	158–200	(France) Denain Voltaire	82–109	76–91
Racing Bell Mechelen (Belgium)	190–144	(Portugal) Coimbra	113–71	77–73
Ghouta (Syria)	0–4*	(Bulgaria) Levski-Spartak	0–2	0–2
AEK (Greece)	139–111	(Turkey) Beşiktaş	72–45	67–66
Handelsministerium (Austria)	4–0*	(Netherlands) Fiat Stars	2–0	2–0
Crvena zvezda (Socialist Federal Republic of Yugoslavia)	196–139	(Finland) Helsingin Kisa-Toverit	95–62	101–77

*Partizani Tirana (for political reasons), Ghouta and Blue Stars Amsterdam all withdrew before the first leg, and their rivals received a forfeit (2-0) in both games.

== Second round ==
Team 1	Agg.	Team 2	1st leg	2nd leg
Spartak ZJŠ Brno (Czechoslovakia)	151–168	(Italy) Fides Napoli	69–76	82–92
Juventud Schweppes (Spain)	217–107	(England) Sutton & Crystal Palace	120–62	97–45
Denain Voltaire (France)	146–158	(Belgium) Racing Bell Mechelen	74–68	72–90
Levski-Spartak (Bulgaria)	170–184	(Greece) AEK	103–69	67–115
Handelsministerium (Austria)	158–205	(Socialist Federal Republic of Yugoslavia) Crvena zvezda	90–97	68–108

Automatically qualified to the quarter-finals group stage

- (Italy) Simmenthal Milano (title holder)

== Quarterfinals ==
The quarter finals were played with a round-robin system, in which every Two Game series (TGS) constituted as one game for the record.

Key to colors
Top two places in each group advance to semifinals

=== Group A ===
	1st leg	2nd leg	Agg
(Italy) Fides Napoli – (Belgium) Racing Bell Mechelen	97-82	77-90	177-172
(Spain) Juventud Schweppes – (Italy) Fides Napoli	83-69	66-92	149-161
(Belgium) Racing Bell Mechelen – (Spain) Juventud Schweppes	96-77	57-77	153-154

	Team	Pld	Pts	W	L	PF	PA	PD
1.	(Italy) Fides Napoli	2	4	2	0	335	321	+14
2.	(Spain) Juventud Schweppes	2	3	1	1	303	314	-11
3.	(Belgium) Racing Bell Mechelen	2	2	0	2	325	328	-3

=== Group B ===
	1st leg	2nd leg	Agg
(Greece) AEK – (Italy) Simmenthal Milano	57-84	76-117	133-201
(Socialist Federal Republic of Yugoslavia) Crvena zvezda – (Greece) AEK	100-63	76-100	176-163
(Italy) Simmenthal Milano – (Socialist Federal Republic of Yugoslavia) Crvena zvezda	86-62	58-84	144-146

	Team	Pld	Pts	W	L	PF	PA	PD
1.	(Socialist Federal Republic of Yugoslavia) Crvena zvezda	2	4	2	0	322	307	+15
2.	(Italy) Simmenthal Milano	2	3	1	1	345	279	+66
3.	(Greece) AEK	2	2	0	2	296	377	-81

== Semifinals ==
Team 1	Agg.	Team 2	1st leg	2nd leg
Fides Napoli (Italy)	152–161	(Italy) Simmenthal Milano	69–85	83–76
Juventud Schweppes (Spain)	153–160	(Socialist Federal Republic of Yugoslavia) Crvena zvezda	83–70	70–90

== Final ==
March 21, Alexandreio Melathron, Thessaloniki

Team 1	Score	Team 2
Simmenthal Milano (Italy)	74–70	(Socialist Federal Republic of Yugoslavia) Crvena zvezda

1971–72 FIBA European Cup Winners' Cup Champions

Simmenthal Milano
2nd title
