= MAFC (basketball) =

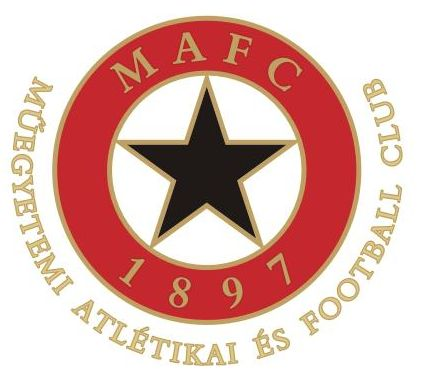
- Leagues: NB I/C
- Founded: 1934
- History: MAFC (1934–1948); Műegyetemi MEFESZ (1948–1949); Budapesti MEFESZ (1949–1950); Budapesti DISZ FSE (1950); Budapesti Haladás (1951-53); Haladás Műszaki Egyetem (1954-55); Budapesti Műszaki Egyetem (1956); MAFC (1957–2008); Újbuda TC (2008-11); MAFC (2011-present)
- Arena: Gabányi László Sportcsarnok (Capacity: 500)
- Location: Budapest, Hungary
- Team colors: red and black
- Championships: 7 Hungarian Championships; 5 Hungarian Cups
- Website: http://www.mafcbasket.hu/

MAFC (Műegyetemi Atlétikai és Football Club) is a Hungarian men's basketball club based in Budapest. MAFC was an active member of the Hungarian Basketball League since 1934, and the club has participated continuously in all seasons since then, almost always in the first division. As a result, is the third most successful club in the Hungarian basketball league with 7 national championships, 23 silver medals and 10 bronze medals. However, lately the club has hit a hard spell, with them currently competing in the third division.

== Honours ==
Total Titles: 12

=== Domestic competitions ===
Hungarian League

- (7): 1935–36, 1944, 1949–50, 1951, 1956, 1970, 1975
- (23): 1934–35, 1937–38, 1943, 1946–47, 1947–48, 1948–49, 1950, 1952, 1953, 1955, 1957, 1958–59, 1959–60, 1960–61, 1962–63, 1964, 1965, 1966, 1967, 1974, 1981–82, 1982–83, 1984–85
- (10): 1936–37, 1945–46, 1954, 1957–58, 1968, 1969, 1973, 1978, 1979, 1980–81

Hungarian Cup

- Winners (5): 1965, 1970, 1972, 1979, 1981
