= JA Vichy =

Former professional basketball club in Vichy, France

- Nickname: JAV
- Founded: 1933
- Dissolved: 2015
- History: JA Vichy (1933-2015)
- Arena: Palais des Sports Pierre Coulon
- Capacity: 3,300
- Location: Vichy, France
- Championships: 2 French Cups; 3 French Pro B

Jeanne d'Arc de Vichy-Clermont Métropole was a professional basketball club based in Vichy, France. The club played their home games at both Maison des Sports de Clermont-Ferrand and Palais des Sports de Vichy. In 2015, JA Vichy and Stade Clermontois Basket Auvergne merged to form a new team called JA Vichy-Clermont for the 2015–16 season.

== Honours ==
=== Domestic competitions ===
- French Cup

Winners (2): 1969, 1970

- Leaders Cup

Runners-up (1): 2008

=== European competitions ===
- FIBA Saporta Cup

Runners-up (1): 1969–70

== Players ==
=== Notable players ===
Note: Flags indicate national team eligibility at FIBA-sanctioned events. Players may hold other non-FIBA nationalities not displayed.

Criteria

To appear in this section a player must have either:

- Set a club record or won an individual award while at the club
- Played at least one official international match for their national team at any time
- Played at least one official NBA match at any time.

- (Kosovo) Habib Ademi
- (Lithuania) Martynas Andriukaitis
- (Mali) Nouha Diakité
- (Iceland) Pavel Ermolinskij
- (United States) Reece Gaines
- (United States) Demetris Nichols
- (United States) Brent Petway
- (United States) Kareem Reid
- (United States) Justin Reynolds
- (United States) Mike Smith
- (United States) David Teague
- (Nigeria) Ime Udoka
- (United States) Ryan Zamroz
