= Partenope Napoli Basket =

Partenope Napoli Basket is an Italian amateur basketball team from Naples, Campania.

== History ==
Partenope Napoli Basket first took part in the top-tier level Italian first division, the LBA, from 1963 to 1965. After stabilizing itself in the top level Italian league in 1967, it stayed there until 1975, with a second-place finish in the 1968–69 season. The club won the 1968 Italian Cup and the European-wide secondary level 1969–70 season's FIBA European Cup Winners' Cup.

The club played in the Italian second division, the Serie A2, between 1975 and 1978, and again for a solitary season in the 1997–98 season. The club then went bankrupt at the end of that season. The club was then re-founded in 2001.

The club played in the amateur Italian 4th-tier level Serie C Basket, during the 2014–15 season.

== Honours ==
Total titles: 2

=== Domestic competitions ===
- Italian Cup

Winners (1): 1967–68
Runners-up (2): 1968–69, 1970–71

=== European competitions ===
- FIBA Saporta Cup

Winners (1): 1969–70
Semifinalist (2): 1970–71, 1971–72

== Notable players ==
1960's

- (Italy) Remo Maggetti
- (Italy) Renato Abbate
- (Italy) Paolo Vittori
- (Italy) Ottorino Flaborea
- (United States) Jim Williams
- (Italy) Lorenzo Angori
- (Italy) Giovanni Gavagnin
- (Italy) Carlos D'Aquila
- (Italy) Sauro Bufalini
- (United States) Miles Aiken

1990's

- (United States) Yamen Sanders
- (Italy) Sergio Mastroianni
- (United States) (United Kingdom) Kenny Atkinson
- (United States) Dave Johnson

=== 1970 FIBA European Cup Winners' Cup winning squad ===
Miles Aiken, Jim Williams, Sauro Bufalini, Carlos d'Aquila, Remo Maggetti, Giovanni Gavagnin, Francesco Ovi, Antonio Errico, Vincenzo Errico, Manfredo Fucile, Renato Abbate, Leonardo Coen (Coach: Antonio Zorzi)

== Sponsorship names ==
Throughout the years, due to sponsorship, the club has been known as:

- Ignis Sud Napoli (1967–1968)
- Fides Napoli (1968–1972)
- Fag Napoli (1973–1976)
- Cosatto Napoli (1976–1977)
- Gis Napoli (1977–1978)
- Pasta Baronia Napoli (1997–1998)
