= List of minor planets: 765001–766000 =

The following is a partial list of minor planets, running from minor-planet number 765001 through 766000, inclusive. The primary data for this and other partial lists is based on JPL's "Small-Body Orbital Elements" and data available from the Minor Planet Center. Critical list information is also provided by the MPC, unless otherwise specified from Lowell Observatory. A detailed description of the table's columns and additional sources are given on the main page including a complete list of every page in this series, and a statistical break-up on the dynamical classification of minor planets.

Also see the summary list of all named bodies in numerical and alphabetical order, and the corresponding naming citations for the number range of this particular list. New namings may only be added to this list after official publication, as the preannouncement of names is condemned by the Working Group for Small Bodies Nomenclature of the International Astronomical Union.

Near-Earth obj.	MBA (inner)	MBA (outer)	Centaur
Mars-crosser	MBA (middle)	Jupiter trojan	Trans-Neptunian obj.
Unclassified

== 765001–765100 ==
Designation			Discovery			Properties		Ref
Permanent	Provisional	Named after	Date	Site	Discoverer(s)	Category	Diam.	Ref
765001	2013 QQ_{88}	—	August 9, 2013	Haleakala	Pan-STARRS 1	EOS	1.4 km	MPC · JPL
765002	2013 QE_{96}	—	August 28, 2013	Mount Lemmon	Mount Lemmon Survey	EUN	940 m	MPC · JPL
765003	2013 QP_{96}	—	August 28, 2013	Mount Lemmon	Mount Lemmon Survey	·	950 m	MPC · JPL
765004	2013 QR_{98}	—	September 6, 2008	Mount Lemmon	Mount Lemmon Survey	·	1.2 km	MPC · JPL
765005	2013 QU_{98}	—	November 26, 2003	Kitt Peak	Spacewatch	·	1.5 km	MPC · JPL
765006	2013 QM_{99}	—	November 23, 2014	Mount Lemmon	Mount Lemmon Survey	·	1.3 km	MPC · JPL
765007	2013 QW_{99}	—	August 28, 2013	Mount Lemmon	Mount Lemmon Survey	·	1.3 km	MPC · JPL
765008	2013 QF_{103}	—	August 26, 2013	Haleakala	Pan-STARRS 1	H	380 m	MPC · JPL
765009	2013 QM_{103}	—	August 29, 2013	Haleakala	Pan-STARRS 1	·	1.6 km	MPC · JPL
765010	2013 QZ_{106}	—	August 28, 2013	Mount Lemmon	Mount Lemmon Survey	·	1.5 km	MPC · JPL
765011	2013 RD_{8}	—	February 27, 2012	Haleakala	Pan-STARRS 1	·	1.5 km	MPC · JPL
765012	2013 RR_{11}	—	September 1, 2013	Haleakala	Pan-STARRS 1	AGN	880 m	MPC · JPL
765013	2013 RX_{13}	—	August 8, 2013	Kitt Peak	Spacewatch	·	1.8 km	MPC · JPL
765014	2013 RT_{15}	—	September 3, 2013	Haleakala	Pan-STARRS 1	·	1.7 km	MPC · JPL
765015 Marčiulionis	2013 RO_{26}	Marčiulionis	September 4, 2013	Baldone	K. Černis, I. Eglītis	L5	6.5 km	MPC · JPL
765016	2013 RQ_{27}	—	September 4, 2013	Mount Lemmon	Mount Lemmon Survey	·	1.5 km	MPC · JPL
765017	2013 RY_{28}	—	January 12, 1999	Mauna Kea	Veillet, C., Anderson, J.	·	1.5 km	MPC · JPL
765018	2013 RD_{30}	—	September 3, 2013	Haleakala	Pan-STARRS 1	H	320 m	MPC · JPL
765019	2013 RU_{36}	—	September 3, 2013	Kitt Peak	Spacewatch	·	2.3 km	MPC · JPL
765020	2013 RV_{39}	—	October 22, 2006	Kitt Peak	Spacewatch	·	760 m	MPC · JPL
765021	2013 RA_{40}	—	September 3, 2013	Piszkés-tető	K. Sárneczky, S. Kürti	·	850 m	MPC · JPL
765022	2013 RG_{41}	—	September 5, 2013	Kitt Peak	Spacewatch	·	2.3 km	MPC · JPL
765023	2013 RA_{46}	—	November 2, 2008	Catalina	CSS	·	1.8 km	MPC · JPL
765024	2013 RA_{54}	—	September 4, 2013	Haleakala	Pan-STARRS 1	H	410 m	MPC · JPL
765025	2013 RB_{55}	—	August 12, 2013	Haleakala	Pan-STARRS 1	EOS	1.1 km	MPC · JPL
765026	2013 RQ_{55}	—	August 26, 2013	Haleakala	Pan-STARRS 1	·	1.9 km	MPC · JPL
765027	2013 RE_{56}	—	September 10, 2013	Haleakala	Pan-STARRS 1	·	2.0 km	MPC · JPL
765028	2013 RC_{60}	—	September 10, 2013	Haleakala	Pan-STARRS 1	EOS	1.3 km	MPC · JPL
765029	2013 RC_{61}	—	September 12, 2013	Kitt Peak	Spacewatch	EOS	1.3 km	MPC · JPL
765030	2013 RR_{61}	—	September 1, 2013	Mount Lemmon	Mount Lemmon Survey	·	1.8 km	MPC · JPL
765031	2013 RW_{72}	—	September 6, 2013	Kitt Peak	Spacewatch	H	380 m	MPC · JPL
765032	2013 RW_{75}	—	March 1, 2011	Mount Lemmon	Mount Lemmon Survey	·	2.1 km	MPC · JPL
765033	2013 RX_{76}	—	September 20, 2008	Mount Lemmon	Mount Lemmon Survey	·	1.5 km	MPC · JPL
765034	2013 RE_{85}	—	September 13, 2013	Kitt Peak	Spacewatch	·	690 m	MPC · JPL
765035	2013 RL_{85}	—	September 13, 2013	Kitt Peak	Spacewatch	·	540 m	MPC · JPL
765036	2013 RB_{89}	—	September 14, 2013	Kitt Peak	Spacewatch	TIR	1.7 km	MPC · JPL
765037	2013 RE_{93}	—	January 16, 2004	Kitt Peak	Spacewatch	·	410 m	MPC · JPL
765038	2013 RZ_{99}	—	September 3, 2013	Kitt Peak	Spacewatch	·	2.2 km	MPC · JPL
765039	2013 RE_{100}	—	September 14, 2013	Haleakala	Pan-STARRS 1	·	2.0 km	MPC · JPL
765040	2013 RJ_{102}	—	October 8, 2008	Mount Lemmon	Mount Lemmon Survey	EOS	1.5 km	MPC · JPL
765041	2013 RK_{103}	—	September 14, 2013	Kitt Peak	Spacewatch	BRG	1.0 km	MPC · JPL
765042	2013 RV_{103}	—	February 27, 2012	Haleakala	Pan-STARRS 1	·	2.0 km	MPC · JPL
765043	2013 RV_{105}	—	September 12, 2013	Mount Lemmon	Mount Lemmon Survey	·	2.2 km	MPC · JPL
765044	2013 RJ_{106}	—	November 30, 2008	Kitt Peak	Spacewatch	·	1.6 km	MPC · JPL
765045	2013 RH_{107}	—	September 15, 2013	Mount Lemmon	Mount Lemmon Survey	·	490 m	MPC · JPL
765046	2013 RE_{108}	—	January 13, 2008	Kitt Peak	Spacewatch	·	440 m	MPC · JPL
765047	2013 RA_{109}	—	October 3, 2014	Cerro Tololo	DECam	EDDO	216 km	MPC · JPL
765048	2013 RX_{110}	—	September 1, 2013	Haleakala	Pan-STARRS 1	·	1.8 km	MPC · JPL
765049	2013 RZ_{110}	—	September 14, 2013	Haleakala	Pan-STARRS 1	·	710 m	MPC · JPL
765050	2013 RN_{113}	—	September 14, 2013	Haleakala	Pan-STARRS 1	·	850 m	MPC · JPL
765051	2013 RQ_{116}	—	September 15, 2013	Haleakala	Pan-STARRS 1	H	390 m	MPC · JPL
765052	2013 RK_{119}	—	September 9, 2013	Haleakala	Pan-STARRS 1	·	1.8 km	MPC · JPL
765053	2013 RW_{119}	—	August 28, 2013	Mount Lemmon	Mount Lemmon Survey	·	2.0 km	MPC · JPL
765054	2013 RC_{120}	—	September 14, 2013	Haleakala	Pan-STARRS 1	VER	2.2 km	MPC · JPL
765055	2013 RP_{120}	—	September 3, 2013	Piszkéstető	K. Sárneczky	EOS	1.4 km	MPC · JPL
765056	2013 RK_{122}	—	September 15, 2013	Mount Lemmon	Mount Lemmon Survey	·	1.4 km	MPC · JPL
765057	2013 RT_{123}	—	September 6, 2013	Mount Lemmon	Mount Lemmon Survey	·	860 m	MPC · JPL
765058	2013 RC_{126}	—	September 12, 2013	Mount Lemmon	Mount Lemmon Survey	·	1.9 km	MPC · JPL
765059	2013 RU_{126}	—	September 14, 2013	Haleakala	Pan-STARRS 1	EOS	1.5 km	MPC · JPL
765060	2013 RA_{129}	—	September 15, 2013	Haleakala	Pan-STARRS 1	HYG	2.1 km	MPC · JPL
765061	2013 RD_{129}	—	September 3, 2013	Kitt Peak	Spacewatch	·	2.1 km	MPC · JPL
765062	2013 RO_{129}	—	September 5, 2013	Kitt Peak	Spacewatch	·	2.3 km	MPC · JPL
765063	2013 RQ_{129}	—	September 3, 2013	Mount Lemmon	Mount Lemmon Survey	·	1.9 km	MPC · JPL
765064	2013 RK_{131}	—	September 1, 2013	Mount Lemmon	Mount Lemmon Survey	·	1.9 km	MPC · JPL
765065	2013 RQ_{131}	—	September 1, 2013	Mount Lemmon	Mount Lemmon Survey	·	1.5 km	MPC · JPL
765066	2013 RT_{131}	—	September 6, 2013	Mount Lemmon	Mount Lemmon Survey	·	1.5 km	MPC · JPL
765067	2013 RE_{133}	—	September 2, 2013	Mount Lemmon	Mount Lemmon Survey	·	740 m	MPC · JPL
765068	2013 RV_{135}	—	September 13, 2013	Mount Lemmon	Mount Lemmon Survey	MAS	480 m	MPC · JPL
765069	2013 RD_{136}	—	September 14, 2013	Haleakala	Pan-STARRS 1	·	920 m	MPC · JPL
765070	2013 RR_{136}	—	September 1, 2013	Mount Lemmon	Mount Lemmon Survey	·	1.3 km	MPC · JPL
765071	2013 RH_{137}	—	September 6, 2013	Mount Lemmon	Mount Lemmon Survey	EOS	1.3 km	MPC · JPL
765072	2013 RU_{137}	—	September 1, 2013	Haleakala	Pan-STARRS 1	KOR	1.1 km	MPC · JPL
765073	2013 RD_{138}	—	September 14, 2013	Haleakala	Pan-STARRS 1	·	1.7 km	MPC · JPL
765074	2013 RT_{138}	—	September 14, 2013	Haleakala	Pan-STARRS 1	·	1.3 km	MPC · JPL
765075	2013 RA_{142}	—	September 14, 2013	Haleakala	Pan-STARRS 1	·	2.1 km	MPC · JPL
765076	2013 RA_{144}	—	September 2, 2013	Haleakala	Pan-STARRS 1	H	360 m	MPC · JPL
765077	2013 RC_{144}	—	September 14, 2013	Haleakala	Pan-STARRS 1	EOS	1.2 km	MPC · JPL
765078	2013 RZ_{147}	—	September 1, 2013	Mount Lemmon	Mount Lemmon Survey	·	1.3 km	MPC · JPL
765079	2013 RA_{148}	—	September 14, 2013	Mount Lemmon	Mount Lemmon Survey	EOS	1.3 km	MPC · JPL
765080	2013 RB_{148}	—	September 14, 2013	Haleakala	Pan-STARRS 1	EOS	1.3 km	MPC · JPL
765081	2013 RM_{148}	—	September 14, 2013	Haleakala	Pan-STARRS 1	·	1.8 km	MPC · JPL
765082	2013 RR_{148}	—	September 14, 2013	Haleakala	Pan-STARRS 1	L5	7.0 km	MPC · JPL
765083	2013 RS_{148}	—	September 14, 2013	Haleakala	Pan-STARRS 1	L5	6.3 km	MPC · JPL
765084	2013 RW_{149}	—	September 15, 2013	Mount Lemmon	Mount Lemmon Survey	L5	6.4 km	MPC · JPL
765085	2013 RJ_{153}	—	September 14, 2013	Mount Lemmon	Mount Lemmon Survey	·	1.9 km	MPC · JPL
765086	2013 RT_{153}	—	September 15, 2013	Mount Lemmon	Mount Lemmon Survey	·	1.5 km	MPC · JPL
765087	2013 RE_{159}	—	September 13, 2013	Mount Lemmon	Mount Lemmon Survey	615	1.2 km	MPC · JPL
765088	2013 RM_{159}	—	September 14, 2013	Haleakala	Pan-STARRS 1	·	1.5 km	MPC · JPL
765089	2013 RE_{161}	—	September 4, 2013	Mount Lemmon	Mount Lemmon Survey	·	2.4 km	MPC · JPL
765090	2013 RE_{162}	—	September 11, 2013	Calar Alto	S. Hellmich, S. Mottola	·	2.4 km	MPC · JPL
765091	2013 RG_{162}	—	September 13, 2013	Kitt Peak	Spacewatch	·	1.5 km	MPC · JPL
765092	2013 RF_{164}	—	September 14, 2013	Haleakala	Pan-STARRS 1	·	2.0 km	MPC · JPL
765093	2013 RZ_{168}	—	September 5, 2013	Kitt Peak	Spacewatch	EOS	1.3 km	MPC · JPL
765094	2013 RV_{170}	—	September 14, 2013	Kitt Peak	Spacewatch	·	1.2 km	MPC · JPL
765095	2013 RS_{172}	—	September 1, 2013	Haleakala	Pan-STARRS 1	·	1.3 km	MPC · JPL
765096	2013 RJ_{174}	—	September 14, 2013	Haleakala	Pan-STARRS 1	·	1.9 km	MPC · JPL
765097	2013 RK_{175}	—	February 27, 2006	Mount Lemmon	Mount Lemmon Survey	·	2.0 km	MPC · JPL
765098	2013 RE_{178}	—	September 3, 2013	Haleakala	Pan-STARRS 1	KOR	910 m	MPC · JPL
765099	2013 RG_{178}	—	September 14, 2013	Haleakala	Pan-STARRS 1	L5	6.9 km	MPC · JPL
765100	2013 RS_{178}	—	September 14, 2013	Haleakala	Pan-STARRS 1	·	1.9 km	MPC · JPL

== 765101–765200 ==
back to top

Designation			Discovery			Properties		Ref
Permanent	Provisional	Named after	Date	Site	Discoverer(s)	Category	Diam.	Ref
765101	2013 RT_{190}	—	September 15, 2013	Mount Lemmon	Mount Lemmon Survey	·	2.5 km	MPC · JPL
765102	2013 ST_{2}	—	September 16, 2013	Mount Lemmon	Mount Lemmon Survey	TIR	2.1 km	MPC · JPL
765103	2013 SM_{3}	—	October 28, 2008	Kitt Peak	Spacewatch	·	1.9 km	MPC · JPL
765104	2013 SG_{7}	—	September 17, 2013	Mount Lemmon	Mount Lemmon Survey	L5	6.1 km	MPC · JPL
765105	2013 SD_{9}	—	February 15, 2012	Haleakala	Pan-STARRS 1	·	1.3 km	MPC · JPL
765106	2013 SN_{12}	—	November 1, 2008	Kitt Peak	Spacewatch	THM	2.0 km	MPC · JPL
765107	2013 SK_{16}	—	November 19, 2003	Kitt Peak	Spacewatch	·	620 m	MPC · JPL
765108	2013 SJ_{18}	—	September 9, 2013	Haleakala	Pan-STARRS 1	·	520 m	MPC · JPL
765109	2013 SY_{26}	—	September 29, 2013	Elena Remote	Oreshko, A.	·	830 m	MPC · JPL
765110	2013 SQ_{27}	—	September 11, 2007	Mount Lemmon	Mount Lemmon Survey	·	3.0 km	MPC · JPL
765111	2013 SR_{28}	—	September 29, 2013	Palomar	Palomar Transient Factory	·	2.3 km	MPC · JPL
765112	2013 SY_{30}	—	August 26, 2013	Haleakala	Pan-STARRS 1	·	1.9 km	MPC · JPL
765113	2013 SX_{32}	—	September 28, 2003	Kitt Peak	Spacewatch	·	1.3 km	MPC · JPL
765114	2013 SZ_{36}	—	April 26, 2006	Cerro Tololo	Deep Ecliptic Survey	·	1.5 km	MPC · JPL
765115	2013 SN_{37}	—	December 14, 2010	Mount Lemmon	Mount Lemmon Survey	·	540 m	MPC · JPL
765116	2013 SH_{39}	—	February 26, 2012	Haleakala	Pan-STARRS 1	·	770 m	MPC · JPL
765117	2013 SV_{40}	—	August 12, 2013	Haleakala	Pan-STARRS 1	·	1.3 km	MPC · JPL
765118	2013 SM_{41}	—	November 24, 2003	Kitt Peak	Spacewatch	·	1.2 km	MPC · JPL
765119	2013 SS_{47}	—	September 10, 2013	Haleakala	Pan-STARRS 1	·	1.5 km	MPC · JPL
765120	2013 SL_{49}	—	September 28, 2013	Mount Lemmon	Mount Lemmon Survey	NYS	920 m	MPC · JPL
765121	2013 SJ_{52}	—	September 28, 2013	Haleakala	Pan-STARRS 1	·	2.4 km	MPC · JPL
765122	2013 SB_{53}	—	September 29, 2013	Palomar	Palomar Transient Factory	·	680 m	MPC · JPL
765123	2013 SM_{54}	—	September 29, 2008	Mount Lemmon	Mount Lemmon Survey	EOS	1.5 km	MPC · JPL
765124	2013 SM_{61}	—	September 3, 2013	Haleakala	Pan-STARRS 1	EOS	1.3 km	MPC · JPL
765125	2013 SE_{63}	—	March 1, 2008	Kitt Peak	Spacewatch	·	580 m	MPC · JPL
765126	2013 SH_{65}	—	September 3, 2013	Mount Lemmon	Mount Lemmon Survey	·	1.2 km	MPC · JPL
765127	2013 SU_{69}	—	September 24, 2013	Mount Lemmon	Mount Lemmon Survey	·	1.4 km	MPC · JPL
765128	2013 SZ_{78}	—	September 30, 2013	Mount Lemmon	Mount Lemmon Survey	V	480 m	MPC · JPL
765129	2013 ST_{82}	—	September 30, 2013	Mount Lemmon	Mount Lemmon Survey	·	2.0 km	MPC · JPL
765130	2013 SS_{91}	—	December 8, 2015	Haleakala	Pan-STARRS 1	·	1.8 km	MPC · JPL
765131	2013 SP_{94}	—	September 2, 2013	Mount Lemmon	Mount Lemmon Survey	L5	6.9 km	MPC · JPL
765132	2013 SP_{96}	—	September 17, 2006	Kitt Peak	Spacewatch	·	610 m	MPC · JPL
765133	2013 SL_{102}	—	September 28, 2013	Cerro Tololo-DECam	DECam	ESDO	142 km	MPC · JPL
765134	2013 SH_{105}	—	November 19, 2017	Haleakala	Pan-STARRS 1	·	670 m	MPC · JPL
765135	2013 SU_{107}	—	September 30, 2013	Calar Alto-CASADO	Mottola, S., Proffe, G.	·	1.9 km	MPC · JPL
765136	2013 SA_{108}	—	September 28, 2013	Mount Lemmon	Mount Lemmon Survey	·	920 m	MPC · JPL
765137	2013 SQ_{108}	—	September 25, 2013	Kitt Peak	Spacewatch	·	760 m	MPC · JPL
765138	2013 SB_{109}	—	September 28, 2013	Mount Lemmon	Mount Lemmon Survey	·	1.4 km	MPC · JPL
765139	2013 SW_{109}	—	September 24, 2013	Catalina	CSS	·	2.1 km	MPC · JPL
765140	2013 SW_{110}	—	September 24, 2013	Mount Lemmon	Mount Lemmon Survey	EOS	1.2 km	MPC · JPL
765141	2013 SS_{111}	—	September 26, 2013	Mount Lemmon	Mount Lemmon Survey	·	1.8 km	MPC · JPL
765142	2013 SU_{111}	—	September 30, 2013	Mount Lemmon	Mount Lemmon Survey	L5	8.0 km	MPC · JPL
765143	2013 SV_{113}	—	September 30, 2013	Mount Lemmon	Mount Lemmon Survey	·	2.2 km	MPC · JPL
765144	2013 SA_{120}	—	September 28, 2013	Mount Lemmon	Mount Lemmon Survey	·	880 m	MPC · JPL
765145	2013 TJ_{3}	—	October 1, 2013	Palomar	Palomar Transient Factory	·	3.2 km	MPC · JPL
765146	2013 TU_{6}	—	September 10, 2013	Haleakala	Pan-STARRS 1	·	710 m	MPC · JPL
765147	2013 TB_{16}	—	October 1, 2013	Mount Lemmon	Mount Lemmon Survey	·	1.4 km	MPC · JPL
765148	2013 TH_{16}	—	April 19, 2006	Mount Lemmon	Mount Lemmon Survey	THM	1.8 km	MPC · JPL
765149	2013 TQ_{16}	—	September 10, 2013	Haleakala	Pan-STARRS 1	·	1.9 km	MPC · JPL
765150	2013 TF_{20}	—	October 1, 2013	Mount Lemmon	Mount Lemmon Survey	·	2.2 km	MPC · JPL
765151	2013 TL_{21}	—	October 1, 2013	Mount Lemmon	Mount Lemmon Survey	·	2.1 km	MPC · JPL
765152	2013 TT_{25}	—	September 6, 2013	Mount Lemmon	Mount Lemmon Survey	·	1.8 km	MPC · JPL
765153	2013 TL_{26}	—	October 23, 2006	Kitt Peak	Spacewatch	·	760 m	MPC · JPL
765154	2013 TJ_{27}	—	March 13, 2007	Mount Lemmon	Mount Lemmon Survey	GAL	1.2 km	MPC · JPL
765155	2013 TE_{29}	—	October 1, 2013	Kitt Peak	Spacewatch	NYS	770 m	MPC · JPL
765156	2013 TC_{30}	—	September 17, 2013	Mount Lemmon	Mount Lemmon Survey	MAS	510 m	MPC · JPL
765157	2013 TF_{31}	—	August 30, 2013	Mauna Kea	D. J. Tholen, M. Micheli	VER	2.1 km	MPC · JPL
765158	2013 TF_{33}	—	October 29, 2000	Kitt Peak	Spacewatch	·	460 m	MPC · JPL
765159	2013 TG_{40}	—	October 8, 2004	Kitt Peak	Spacewatch	·	1.7 km	MPC · JPL
765160	2013 TT_{41}	—	October 2, 2013	Mount Lemmon	Mount Lemmon Survey	·	2.4 km	MPC · JPL
765161	2013 TC_{42}	—	October 2, 2013	Mount Lemmon	Mount Lemmon Survey	·	1.8 km	MPC · JPL
765162	2013 TX_{42}	—	October 3, 2013	Kitt Peak	Spacewatch	·	2.0 km	MPC · JPL
765163	2013 TU_{44}	—	October 3, 2013	Catalina	CSS	·	1.9 km	MPC · JPL
765164	2013 TK_{48}	—	September 12, 2013	Mount Lemmon	Mount Lemmon Survey	·	1.9 km	MPC · JPL
765165	2013 TN_{56}	—	October 4, 2013	Mount Lemmon	Mount Lemmon Survey	·	530 m	MPC · JPL
765166	2013 TT_{56}	—	October 4, 2013	Mount Lemmon	Mount Lemmon Survey	·	2.3 km	MPC · JPL
765167	2013 TZ_{59}	—	October 4, 2013	Mount Lemmon	Mount Lemmon Survey	·	1.9 km	MPC · JPL
765168	2013 TJ_{64}	—	October 4, 2013	Mount Lemmon	Mount Lemmon Survey	·	2.2 km	MPC · JPL
765169	2013 TX_{64}	—	October 23, 2008	Kitt Peak	Spacewatch	·	1.3 km	MPC · JPL
765170	2013 TL_{68}	—	October 5, 2013	Haleakala	Pan-STARRS 1	·	2.0 km	MPC · JPL
765171	2013 TT_{69}	—	October 2, 2008	Mount Lemmon	Mount Lemmon Survey	·	2.0 km	MPC · JPL
765172	2013 TP_{74}	—	November 17, 2006	Mount Lemmon	Mount Lemmon Survey	NYS	600 m	MPC · JPL
765173	2013 TR_{77}	—	March 13, 2008	Mount Lemmon	Mount Lemmon Survey	·	520 m	MPC · JPL
765174	2013 TH_{78}	—	October 5, 2013	Haleakala	Pan-STARRS 1	·	750 m	MPC · JPL
765175	2013 TN_{79}	—	September 15, 2006	Kitt Peak	Spacewatch	·	580 m	MPC · JPL
765176	2013 TG_{82}	—	October 27, 2006	Mount Lemmon	Mount Lemmon Survey	·	640 m	MPC · JPL
765177	2013 TF_{83}	—	October 1, 2013	Kitt Peak	Spacewatch	·	910 m	MPC · JPL
765178	2013 TZ_{83}	—	October 1, 2013	Kitt Peak	Spacewatch	EMA	2.0 km	MPC · JPL
765179	2013 TC_{84}	—	October 1, 2013	Kitt Peak	Spacewatch	·	2.0 km	MPC · JPL
765180	2013 TO_{86}	—	April 10, 2005	Kitt Peak	Spacewatch	·	670 m	MPC · JPL
765181	2013 TW_{86}	—	October 1, 2013	Mount Lemmon	Mount Lemmon Survey	EOS	1.3 km	MPC · JPL
765182	2013 TJ_{93}	—	June 17, 2007	Kitt Peak	Spacewatch	·	1.9 km	MPC · JPL
765183	2013 TA_{96}	—	October 2, 2013	Bergisch Gladbach	W. Bickel	·	2.1 km	MPC · JPL
765184	2013 TF_{97}	—	February 10, 2011	Mount Lemmon	Mount Lemmon Survey	·	920 m	MPC · JPL
765185	2013 TD_{99}	—	October 2, 2013	Kitt Peak	Spacewatch	PHO	740 m	MPC · JPL
765186	2013 TT_{105}	—	October 3, 2013	Mount Lemmon	Mount Lemmon Survey	EOS	1.4 km	MPC · JPL
765187	2013 TA_{106}	—	October 3, 2013	Catalina	CSS	·	2.3 km	MPC · JPL
765188	2013 TG_{107}	—	November 11, 2006	Kitt Peak	Spacewatch	·	490 m	MPC · JPL
765189	2013 TC_{117}	—	October 4, 2013	Mount Lemmon	Mount Lemmon Survey	·	2.2 km	MPC · JPL
765190	2013 TL_{118}	—	October 4, 2013	Mount Lemmon	Mount Lemmon Survey	·	2.6 km	MPC · JPL
765191	2013 TN_{125}	—	September 15, 2013	Haleakala	Pan-STARRS 1	·	2.2 km	MPC · JPL
765192	2013 TX_{125}	—	October 11, 2002	Kitt Peak	Spacewatch	·	1.8 km	MPC · JPL
765193	2013 TZ_{125}	—	May 2, 2006	Mount Lemmon	Mount Lemmon Survey	EOS	1.5 km	MPC · JPL
765194	2013 TW_{127}	—	October 3, 2013	Kitt Peak	Spacewatch	·	2.1 km	MPC · JPL
765195	2013 TH_{131}	—	September 14, 2013	Haleakala	Pan-STARRS 1	·	2.6 km	MPC · JPL
765196	2013 TY_{139}	—	March 25, 2006	Mount Lemmon	Mount Lemmon Survey	TEL	1.0 km	MPC · JPL
765197	2013 TB_{142}	—	September 4, 2013	Mount Lemmon	Mount Lemmon Survey	·	1.8 km	MPC · JPL
765198	2013 TE_{143}	—	September 28, 2013	Mount Lemmon	Mount Lemmon Survey	·	2.8 km	MPC · JPL
765199	2013 TJ_{144}	—	March 12, 2010	Mount Lemmon	Mount Lemmon Survey	·	1.3 km	MPC · JPL
765200	2013 TF_{148}	—	February 8, 2011	Mount Lemmon	Mount Lemmon Survey	·	1.4 km	MPC · JPL

== 765201–765300 ==
back to top

Designation			Discovery			Properties		Ref
Permanent	Provisional	Named after	Date	Site	Discoverer(s)	Category	Diam.	Ref
765201	2013 TP_{150}	—	October 3, 2013	Mount Lemmon	Mount Lemmon Survey	·	1.8 km	MPC · JPL
765202	2013 TV_{152}	—	September 1, 2007	Siding Spring	K. Sárneczky, L. Kiss	·	2.0 km	MPC · JPL
765203	2013 TQ_{153}	—	March 8, 2005	Mount Lemmon	Mount Lemmon Survey	·	2.0 km	MPC · JPL
765204	2013 TF_{157}	—	February 22, 2004	Kitt Peak	Deep Ecliptic Survey	THM	1.6 km	MPC · JPL
765205	2013 TS_{157}	—	November 9, 2013	Haleakala	Pan-STARRS 1	·	1.7 km	MPC · JPL
765206	2013 TS_{160}	—	October 3, 2013	Kitt Peak	Spacewatch	·	2.4 km	MPC · JPL
765207	2013 TX_{160}	—	October 3, 2013	Kitt Peak	Spacewatch	·	1.6 km	MPC · JPL
765208	2013 TE_{161}	—	October 7, 2013	Kitt Peak	Spacewatch	·	1.3 km	MPC · JPL
765209	2013 TO_{162}	—	September 13, 2007	Mount Lemmon	Mount Lemmon Survey	·	2.4 km	MPC · JPL
765210	2013 TV_{162}	—	October 5, 2013	Haleakala	Pan-STARRS 1	·	1.9 km	MPC · JPL
765211	2013 TN_{163}	—	November 7, 2008	Mount Lemmon	Mount Lemmon Survey	·	1.3 km	MPC · JPL
765212	2013 TP_{167}	—	October 3, 2013	Haleakala	Pan-STARRS 1	·	1.9 km	MPC · JPL
765213	2013 TL_{168}	—	October 3, 2013	Haleakala	Pan-STARRS 1	·	2.4 km	MPC · JPL
765214	2013 TX_{169}	—	October 7, 2013	Kitt Peak	Spacewatch	·	2.2 km	MPC · JPL
765215	2013 TC_{170}	—	October 9, 2013	Mount Lemmon	Mount Lemmon Survey	·	2.1 km	MPC · JPL
765216	2013 TJ_{170}	—	May 9, 2011	Mount Lemmon	Mount Lemmon Survey	·	2.4 km	MPC · JPL
765217	2013 TW_{172}	—	February 10, 2015	Mount Lemmon	Mount Lemmon Survey	·	750 m	MPC · JPL
765218	2013 TX_{172}	—	October 1, 2013	Mount Lemmon	Mount Lemmon Survey	·	990 m	MPC · JPL
765219	2013 TR_{174}	—	October 5, 2013	Haleakala	Pan-STARRS 1	·	680 m	MPC · JPL
765220	2013 TT_{174}	—	October 13, 2013	Mount Lemmon	Mount Lemmon Survey	·	1.7 km	MPC · JPL
765221	2013 TL_{175}	—	October 14, 2013	Kitt Peak	Spacewatch	·	780 m	MPC · JPL
765222	2013 TU_{175}	—	October 5, 2013	Kitt Peak	Spacewatch	·	2.7 km	MPC · JPL
765223	2013 TX_{175}	—	October 3, 2013	Mount Lemmon	Mount Lemmon Survey	·	2.2 km	MPC · JPL
765224	2013 TS_{176}	—	October 15, 2013	Kitt Peak	Spacewatch	·	740 m	MPC · JPL
765225	2013 TD_{177}	—	October 3, 2013	Haleakala	Pan-STARRS 1	·	650 m	MPC · JPL
765226	2013 TM_{177}	—	October 1, 2013	Mount Lemmon	Mount Lemmon Survey	·	850 m	MPC · JPL
765227	2013 TK_{179}	—	October 5, 2013	Haleakala	Pan-STARRS 1	MAS	510 m	MPC · JPL
765228	2013 TY_{182}	—	October 1, 2013	Mount Lemmon	Mount Lemmon Survey	HYG	2.2 km	MPC · JPL
765229	2013 TC_{183}	—	December 21, 2014	Mount Lemmon	Mount Lemmon Survey	·	2.4 km	MPC · JPL
765230	2013 TG_{186}	—	October 3, 2013	Mount Lemmon	Mount Lemmon Survey	EOS	1.5 km	MPC · JPL
765231	2013 TX_{186}	—	October 3, 2013	Mount Lemmon	Mount Lemmon Survey	PHO	500 m	MPC · JPL
765232	2013 TJ_{188}	—	October 7, 2013	Kitt Peak	Spacewatch	LIX	2.6 km	MPC · JPL
765233	2013 TT_{188}	—	October 5, 2013	Haleakala	Pan-STARRS 1	V	420 m	MPC · JPL
765234	2013 TN_{190}	—	October 2, 2013	Kitt Peak	Spacewatch	LIX	2.8 km	MPC · JPL
765235	2013 TU_{190}	—	October 9, 2013	Oukaïmeden	M. Ory	TIR	2.1 km	MPC · JPL
765236	2013 TY_{192}	—	October 13, 2013	Mount Lemmon	Mount Lemmon Survey	·	2.3 km	MPC · JPL
765237	2013 TM_{193}	—	October 1, 2013	Kitt Peak	Spacewatch	·	1.9 km	MPC · JPL
765238	2013 TX_{193}	—	October 12, 2013	Kitt Peak	Spacewatch	·	1.8 km	MPC · JPL
765239	2013 TT_{194}	—	October 3, 2013	Haleakala	Pan-STARRS 1	THM	1.8 km	MPC · JPL
765240	2013 TL_{195}	—	September 13, 2013	Mount Lemmon	Mount Lemmon Survey	·	770 m	MPC · JPL
765241	2013 TT_{195}	—	October 4, 2013	Mount Lemmon	Mount Lemmon Survey	·	2.1 km	MPC · JPL
765242	2013 TY_{195}	—	October 9, 2013	Mount Lemmon	Mount Lemmon Survey	·	2.0 km	MPC · JPL
765243	2013 TD_{196}	—	October 12, 2013	Kitt Peak	Spacewatch	·	1.9 km	MPC · JPL
765244	2013 TX_{196}	—	October 14, 2013	Kitt Peak	Spacewatch	·	1.5 km	MPC · JPL
765245	2013 TG_{197}	—	October 1, 2013	Kitt Peak	Spacewatch	·	2.1 km	MPC · JPL
765246	2013 TP_{197}	—	October 7, 2013	Oukaïmeden	C. Rinner	·	1.9 km	MPC · JPL
765247	2013 TY_{197}	—	October 12, 2013	Kitt Peak	Spacewatch	·	2.0 km	MPC · JPL
765248	2013 TZ_{197}	—	October 2, 2013	Haleakala	Pan-STARRS 1	·	680 m	MPC · JPL
765249	2013 TE_{198}	—	October 2, 2013	Mount Lemmon	Mount Lemmon Survey	·	2.1 km	MPC · JPL
765250	2013 TK_{198}	—	October 1, 2013	Mount Lemmon	Mount Lemmon Survey	·	2.1 km	MPC · JPL
765251	2013 TO_{198}	—	October 3, 2013	Haleakala	Pan-STARRS 1	·	2.3 km	MPC · JPL
765252	2013 TR_{198}	—	October 8, 2013	Kitt Peak	Spacewatch	·	2.3 km	MPC · JPL
765253	2013 TF_{199}	—	October 9, 2013	Mount Lemmon	Mount Lemmon Survey	·	2.3 km	MPC · JPL
765254	2013 TJ_{199}	—	October 1, 2013	Mount Lemmon	Mount Lemmon Survey	MRX	770 m	MPC · JPL
765255	2013 TL_{199}	—	October 3, 2013	Haleakala	Pan-STARRS 1	·	1.9 km	MPC · JPL
765256	2013 TJ_{200}	—	October 2, 2013	Mount Lemmon	Mount Lemmon Survey	·	1.9 km	MPC · JPL
765257	2013 TJ_{202}	—	October 12, 2013	Kitt Peak	Spacewatch	·	1.5 km	MPC · JPL
765258	2013 TF_{204}	—	September 17, 2013	Mount Lemmon	Mount Lemmon Survey	NYS	790 m	MPC · JPL
765259	2013 TU_{204}	—	October 12, 2013	Mount Lemmon	Mount Lemmon Survey	TEL	1.0 km	MPC · JPL
765260	2013 TC_{205}	—	October 3, 2013	Haleakala	Pan-STARRS 1	·	720 m	MPC · JPL
765261	2013 TE_{205}	—	October 12, 2013	Kitt Peak	Spacewatch	L5	7.7 km	MPC · JPL
765262	2013 TH_{205}	—	October 5, 2013	Haleakala	Pan-STARRS 1	·	2.2 km	MPC · JPL
765263	2013 TK_{205}	—	October 3, 2013	Haleakala	Pan-STARRS 1	·	2.0 km	MPC · JPL
765264	2013 TX_{206}	—	October 12, 2013	Mount Lemmon	Mount Lemmon Survey	V	470 m	MPC · JPL
765265	2013 TD_{207}	—	October 14, 2013	Oukaïmeden	C. Rinner	·	2.2 km	MPC · JPL
765266	2013 TX_{207}	—	October 13, 2013	Kitt Peak	Spacewatch	THM	1.7 km	MPC · JPL
765267	2013 TK_{208}	—	October 5, 2013	Haleakala	Pan-STARRS 1	·	810 m	MPC · JPL
765268	2013 TS_{208}	—	October 5, 2013	Kitt Peak	Spacewatch	V	490 m	MPC · JPL
765269	2013 TV_{208}	—	October 29, 2002	Nogales	P. R. Holvorcem, M. Schwartz	·	980 m	MPC · JPL
765270	2013 TD_{209}	—	October 15, 2013	Mount Lemmon	Mount Lemmon Survey	CLA	1.3 km	MPC · JPL
765271	2013 TH_{212}	—	October 5, 2013	Haleakala	Pan-STARRS 1	·	1.7 km	MPC · JPL
765272	2013 TL_{212}	—	October 1, 2013	Mount Lemmon	Mount Lemmon Survey	·	1.8 km	MPC · JPL
765273	2013 TJ_{216}	—	October 13, 2013	Kitt Peak	Spacewatch	VER	2.2 km	MPC · JPL
765274	2013 TG_{218}	—	October 3, 2013	Kitt Peak	Spacewatch	·	2.4 km	MPC · JPL
765275	2013 TH_{218}	—	October 3, 2013	Mount Lemmon	Mount Lemmon Survey	EOS	1.3 km	MPC · JPL
765276	2013 TJ_{218}	—	October 5, 2013	Haleakala	Pan-STARRS 1	·	1.6 km	MPC · JPL
765277	2013 TL_{218}	—	October 14, 2013	Kitt Peak	Spacewatch	·	2.0 km	MPC · JPL
765278	2013 TR_{218}	—	October 13, 2013	Kitt Peak	Spacewatch	L5	6.6 km	MPC · JPL
765279	2013 TY_{218}	—	October 5, 2013	Kitt Peak	Spacewatch	·	2.4 km	MPC · JPL
765280	2013 TC_{219}	—	October 3, 2013	Haleakala	Pan-STARRS 1	L5	6.5 km	MPC · JPL
765281	2013 TT_{219}	—	October 15, 2013	Kitt Peak	Spacewatch	·	1.9 km	MPC · JPL
765282	2013 TB_{220}	—	October 9, 2013	Mount Lemmon	Mount Lemmon Survey	·	1.9 km	MPC · JPL
765283	2013 TG_{220}	—	October 14, 2013	Kitt Peak	Spacewatch	·	2.0 km	MPC · JPL
765284	2013 TJ_{220}	—	October 3, 2013	Kitt Peak	Spacewatch	·	2.0 km	MPC · JPL
765285	2013 TM_{220}	—	October 2, 2013	Mount Lemmon	Mount Lemmon Survey	HOF	2.0 km	MPC · JPL
765286	2013 TN_{222}	—	October 1, 2013	Mount Lemmon	Mount Lemmon Survey	V	440 m	MPC · JPL
765287	2013 TJ_{223}	—	October 10, 2008	Kitt Peak	Spacewatch	EOS	1.2 km	MPC · JPL
765288	2013 TJ_{224}	—	October 4, 2013	Mount Lemmon	Mount Lemmon Survey	·	1.5 km	MPC · JPL
765289	2013 TQ_{225}	—	October 2, 2013	Haleakala	Pan-STARRS 1	HOF	2.1 km	MPC · JPL
765290	2013 TG_{227}	—	October 3, 2013	Mount Lemmon	Mount Lemmon Survey	·	2.3 km	MPC · JPL
765291	2013 TX_{229}	—	October 2, 2013	Haleakala	Pan-STARRS 1	H	320 m	MPC · JPL
765292	2013 TK_{232}	—	October 3, 2013	Haleakala	Pan-STARRS 1	·	1.7 km	MPC · JPL
765293	2013 TS_{232}	—	October 3, 2013	Kitt Peak	Spacewatch	URS	2.4 km	MPC · JPL
765294	2013 TV_{232}	—	October 6, 2013	Kitt Peak	Spacewatch	L5	7.4 km	MPC · JPL
765295	2013 TD_{233}	—	October 4, 2013	Mount Lemmon	Mount Lemmon Survey	·	1.9 km	MPC · JPL
765296	2013 TE_{233}	—	October 3, 2013	Haleakala	Pan-STARRS 1	EOS	1.3 km	MPC · JPL
765297	2013 TH_{233}	—	October 5, 2013	Haleakala	Pan-STARRS 1	·	980 m	MPC · JPL
765298	2013 TL_{233}	—	October 14, 2013	Mount Lemmon	Mount Lemmon Survey	·	2.5 km	MPC · JPL
765299	2013 TM_{233}	—	October 12, 2013	Mount Lemmon	Mount Lemmon Survey	·	1.7 km	MPC · JPL
765300	2013 TY_{235}	—	October 15, 2013	Mount Lemmon	Mount Lemmon Survey	·	2.5 km	MPC · JPL

== 765301–765400 ==
back to top

Designation			Discovery			Properties		Ref
Permanent	Provisional	Named after	Date	Site	Discoverer(s)	Category	Diam.	Ref
765301	2013 TE_{237}	—	October 13, 2013	Kitt Peak	Spacewatch	EOS	1.2 km	MPC · JPL
765302	2013 TC_{241}	—	October 5, 2013	Haleakala	Pan-STARRS 1	·	1.4 km	MPC · JPL
765303	2013 TG_{243}	—	October 14, 2013	Mount Lemmon	Mount Lemmon Survey	WIT	760 m	MPC · JPL
765304	2013 TN_{248}	—	October 2, 2013	Mount Lemmon	Mount Lemmon Survey	·	1.6 km	MPC · JPL
765305	2013 TA_{249}	—	October 3, 2013	Haleakala	Pan-STARRS 1	EOS	1.3 km	MPC · JPL
765306	2013 TP_{252}	—	October 3, 2013	Haleakala	Pan-STARRS 1	·	2.3 km	MPC · JPL
765307	2013 TB_{276}	—	October 7, 2013	Mount Lemmon	Mount Lemmon Survey	·	2.3 km	MPC · JPL
765308	2013 TD_{281}	—	October 3, 2013	Haleakala	Pan-STARRS 1	·	2.0 km	MPC · JPL
765309	2013 UK_{3}	—	October 23, 2013	Haleakala	Pan-STARRS 1	H	440 m	MPC · JPL
765310	2013 UE_{14}	—	October 7, 2013	Catalina	CSS	·	2.4 km	MPC · JPL
765311	2013 UV_{15}	—	October 26, 2013	Mount Lemmon	Mount Lemmon Survey	H	370 m	MPC · JPL
765312	2013 UG_{16}	—	October 25, 2013	Kitt Peak	Spacewatch	EOS	1.4 km	MPC · JPL
765313	2013 UP_{16}	—	October 30, 2013	Haleakala	Pan-STARRS 1	·	2.2 km	MPC · JPL
765314	2013 UY_{18}	—	October 31, 2013	Kitt Peak	Spacewatch	V	400 m	MPC · JPL
765315	2013 UF_{20}	—	October 24, 2013	Mount Lemmon	Mount Lemmon Survey	·	1.8 km	MPC · JPL
765316	2013 UU_{20}	—	October 25, 2013	Kitt Peak	Spacewatch	EOS	1.6 km	MPC · JPL
765317	2013 UU_{21}	—	December 22, 2008	Kitt Peak	Spacewatch	·	1.7 km	MPC · JPL
765318	2013 UL_{23}	—	October 25, 2013	Nogales	M. Schwartz, P. R. Holvorcem	H	430 m	MPC · JPL
765319	2013 UA_{24}	—	October 26, 2013	Kitt Peak	Spacewatch	·	2.5 km	MPC · JPL
765320	2013 UC_{26}	—	October 26, 2013	Mount Lemmon	Mount Lemmon Survey	NYS	660 m	MPC · JPL
765321	2013 UP_{27}	—	October 26, 2013	Mount Lemmon	Mount Lemmon Survey	·	1.7 km	MPC · JPL
765322	2013 UL_{28}	—	October 15, 2013	Mount Lemmon	Mount Lemmon Survey	·	2.6 km	MPC · JPL
765323	2013 UN_{28}	—	October 31, 2013	Mount Lemmon	Mount Lemmon Survey	·	950 m	MPC · JPL
765324	2013 UA_{29}	—	February 10, 2016	Haleakala	Pan-STARRS 1	·	2.7 km	MPC · JPL
765325	2013 UD_{29}	—	October 4, 2007	Mount Lemmon	Mount Lemmon Survey	·	2.2 km	MPC · JPL
765326	2013 UE_{29}	—	October 30, 2013	Haleakala	Pan-STARRS 1	EOS	1.6 km	MPC · JPL
765327	2013 UN_{29}	—	October 26, 2013	Mount Lemmon	Mount Lemmon Survey	·	2.4 km	MPC · JPL
765328	2013 UP_{29}	—	October 26, 2013	Mount Lemmon	Mount Lemmon Survey	·	1.5 km	MPC · JPL
765329	2013 UA_{30}	—	December 21, 2014	Haleakala	Pan-STARRS 1	EOS	1.4 km	MPC · JPL
765330	2013 UD_{30}	—	January 20, 2015	Mount Lemmon	Mount Lemmon Survey	·	2.2 km	MPC · JPL
765331	2013 UF_{30}	—	October 27, 2013	Mount Lemmon	Mount Lemmon Survey	·	1.5 km	MPC · JPL
765332	2013 UJ_{30}	—	October 24, 2013	Mount Lemmon	Mount Lemmon Survey	·	1.4 km	MPC · JPL
765333	2013 UT_{30}	—	October 31, 2013	Kitt Peak	Spacewatch	·	1.5 km	MPC · JPL
765334	2013 UF_{32}	—	January 16, 2015	Haleakala	Pan-STARRS 1	·	2.2 km	MPC · JPL
765335	2013 UJ_{32}	—	January 20, 2015	Haleakala	Pan-STARRS 1	·	740 m	MPC · JPL
765336	2013 UK_{32}	—	October 31, 2013	Mount Lemmon	Mount Lemmon Survey	·	2.2 km	MPC · JPL
765337	2013 UN_{32}	—	October 30, 2013	Haleakala	Pan-STARRS 1	·	2.1 km	MPC · JPL
765338	2013 UX_{32}	—	October 28, 2013	Mount Lemmon	Mount Lemmon Survey	·	2.3 km	MPC · JPL
765339	2013 UJ_{33}	—	October 31, 2013	Mount Lemmon	Mount Lemmon Survey	·	1.5 km	MPC · JPL
765340	2013 US_{34}	—	October 25, 2013	Kitt Peak	Spacewatch	EOS	1.4 km	MPC · JPL
765341	2013 UT_{34}	—	October 24, 2013	Mount Lemmon	Mount Lemmon Survey	·	2.2 km	MPC · JPL
765342	2013 UN_{35}	—	October 16, 2013	Mount Lemmon	Mount Lemmon Survey	L5	7.2 km	MPC · JPL
765343	2013 UO_{35}	—	October 23, 2013	Haleakala	Pan-STARRS 1	·	1.7 km	MPC · JPL
765344	2013 UM_{36}	—	October 27, 2013	Kitt Peak	Spacewatch	EOS	1.2 km	MPC · JPL
765345	2013 UW_{36}	—	October 23, 2013	Mount Lemmon	Mount Lemmon Survey	·	880 m	MPC · JPL
765346	2013 UZ_{36}	—	October 31, 2013	Mount Lemmon	Mount Lemmon Survey	L5	6.8 km	MPC · JPL
765347	2013 UA_{37}	—	October 24, 2013	Mount Lemmon	Mount Lemmon Survey	·	2.3 km	MPC · JPL
765348	2013 UB_{37}	—	October 23, 2013	Mount Lemmon	Mount Lemmon Survey	·	1.5 km	MPC · JPL
765349	2013 US_{37}	—	October 23, 2013	Haleakala	Pan-STARRS 1	V	510 m	MPC · JPL
765350	2013 UV_{37}	—	October 23, 2013	Mount Lemmon	Mount Lemmon Survey	·	820 m	MPC · JPL
765351	2013 UC_{38}	—	October 25, 2013	Mount Lemmon	Mount Lemmon Survey	·	2.0 km	MPC · JPL
765352	2013 UP_{38}	—	October 24, 2013	Mount Lemmon	Mount Lemmon Survey	EOS	1.4 km	MPC · JPL
765353	2013 UB_{39}	—	October 25, 2013	Mount Lemmon	Mount Lemmon Survey	·	1.9 km	MPC · JPL
765354	2013 UV_{39}	—	October 23, 2013	Mount Lemmon	Mount Lemmon Survey	·	890 m	MPC · JPL
765355	2013 US_{41}	—	October 16, 2013	Mount Lemmon	Mount Lemmon Survey	MAS	570 m	MPC · JPL
765356	2013 UY_{41}	—	October 23, 2013	Mount Lemmon	Mount Lemmon Survey	·	2.4 km	MPC · JPL
765357	2013 UC_{42}	—	October 23, 2013	Mount Lemmon	Mount Lemmon Survey	HYG	1.8 km	MPC · JPL
765358	2013 UE_{42}	—	October 24, 2013	Mount Lemmon	Mount Lemmon Survey	MAS	460 m	MPC · JPL
765359	2013 UM_{43}	—	October 30, 2013	Haleakala	Pan-STARRS 1	H	400 m	MPC · JPL
765360	2013 UD_{45}	—	October 3, 2013	Kitt Peak	Spacewatch	L5	6.5 km	MPC · JPL
765361	2013 UK_{45}	—	October 31, 2013	Mount Lemmon	Mount Lemmon Survey	·	2.5 km	MPC · JPL
765362	2013 UQ_{46}	—	October 28, 2013	Kitt Peak	Spacewatch	·	2.2 km	MPC · JPL
765363	2013 UC_{47}	—	October 24, 2013	Mount Lemmon	Mount Lemmon Survey	·	2.0 km	MPC · JPL
765364	2013 UT_{47}	—	October 24, 2013	Mount Lemmon	Mount Lemmon Survey	·	1.2 km	MPC · JPL
765365	2013 UG_{48}	—	October 28, 2013	Mount Lemmon	Mount Lemmon Survey	·	920 m	MPC · JPL
765366	2013 UB_{49}	—	October 23, 2013	Mount Lemmon	Mount Lemmon Survey	·	840 m	MPC · JPL
765367	2013 UH_{52}	—	October 24, 2013	Mount Lemmon	Mount Lemmon Survey	·	2.0 km	MPC · JPL
765368	2013 UZ_{52}	—	October 27, 2013	Haleakala	Pan-STARRS 1	·	1.8 km	MPC · JPL
765369	2013 UJ_{58}	—	October 28, 2013	Mount Lemmon	Mount Lemmon Survey	EOS	1.2 km	MPC · JPL
765370	2013 UZ_{60}	—	October 23, 2013	Mount Lemmon	Mount Lemmon Survey	·	1.8 km	MPC · JPL
765371	2013 UE_{63}	—	October 28, 2013	Mount Lemmon	Mount Lemmon Survey	·	2.1 km	MPC · JPL
765372	2013 VA_{4}	—	May 12, 2012	Mount Lemmon	Mount Lemmon Survey	·	2.2 km	MPC · JPL
765373	2013 VF_{8}	—	October 27, 2013	Kitt Peak	Spacewatch	·	2.4 km	MPC · JPL
765374	2013 VR_{10}	—	September 16, 2013	Mount Lemmon	Mount Lemmon Survey	·	2.0 km	MPC · JPL
765375	2013 VX_{15}	—	November 1, 2013	Mount Lemmon	Mount Lemmon Survey	·	1.8 km	MPC · JPL
765376	2013 VD_{19}	—	October 28, 2013	Catalina	CSS	·	2.4 km	MPC · JPL
765377	2013 VJ_{22}	—	January 27, 2007	Kitt Peak	Spacewatch	·	930 m	MPC · JPL
765378	2013 VM_{22}	—	October 26, 2013	Catalina	CSS	PHO	690 m	MPC · JPL
765379	2013 VL_{27}	—	August 19, 2012	ESA OGS	ESA OGS	·	2.5 km	MPC · JPL
765380	2013 VT_{27}	—	November 2, 2013	Kitt Peak	Spacewatch	·	2.6 km	MPC · JPL
765381	2013 VO_{28}	—	November 5, 2013	Haleakala	Pan-STARRS 1	·	3.3 km	MPC · JPL
765382	2013 VC_{30}	—	November 10, 2013	Kitt Peak	Spacewatch	·	730 m	MPC · JPL
765383	2013 VH_{31}	—	December 3, 1996	Kitt Peak	Spacewatch	·	1.0 km	MPC · JPL
765384	2013 VL_{33}	—	November 8, 2013	Mount Lemmon	Mount Lemmon Survey	·	2.3 km	MPC · JPL
765385	2013 VT_{33}	—	November 9, 2013	Haleakala	Pan-STARRS 1	·	2.2 km	MPC · JPL
765386	2013 VS_{35}	—	November 9, 2013	Haleakala	Pan-STARRS 1	·	2.6 km	MPC · JPL
765387	2013 VC_{36}	—	November 1, 2013	Mount Lemmon	Mount Lemmon Survey	PHO	670 m	MPC · JPL
765388	2013 VO_{36}	—	November 9, 2013	Haleakala	Pan-STARRS 1	·	710 m	MPC · JPL
765389	2013 VD_{40}	—	November 7, 2013	Kitt Peak	Spacewatch	·	640 m	MPC · JPL
765390	2013 VH_{40}	—	November 4, 2013	Mount Lemmon	Mount Lemmon Survey	·	2.4 km	MPC · JPL
765391	2013 VW_{41}	—	November 2, 2013	Mount Lemmon	Mount Lemmon Survey	·	1.8 km	MPC · JPL
765392	2013 VX_{41}	—	November 9, 2013	Mount Lemmon	Mount Lemmon Survey	T_{j} (2.96)	2.7 km	MPC · JPL
765393	2013 VF_{42}	—	November 9, 2013	Mount Lemmon	Mount Lemmon Survey	·	2.6 km	MPC · JPL
765394	2013 VM_{42}	—	November 9, 2013	Haleakala	Pan-STARRS 1	·	1.3 km	MPC · JPL
765395	2013 VU_{42}	—	November 9, 2013	Haleakala	Pan-STARRS 1	·	1.3 km	MPC · JPL
765396	2013 VC_{43}	—	November 7, 2013	Mount Lemmon	Mount Lemmon Survey	·	1.7 km	MPC · JPL
765397	2013 VD_{43}	—	November 6, 2013	Haleakala	Pan-STARRS 1	·	750 m	MPC · JPL
765398	2013 VF_{43}	—	January 20, 2015	Haleakala	Pan-STARRS 1	·	1.7 km	MPC · JPL
765399	2013 VX_{43}	—	November 9, 2013	Haleakala	Pan-STARRS 1	·	2.0 km	MPC · JPL
765400	2013 VT_{44}	—	November 7, 2013	Kitt Peak	Spacewatch	·	1.7 km	MPC · JPL

== 765401–765500 ==
back to top

Designation			Discovery			Properties		Ref
Permanent	Provisional	Named after	Date	Site	Discoverer(s)	Category	Diam.	Ref
765401	2013 VB_{45}	—	November 10, 2013	Kitt Peak	Spacewatch	EOS	1.2 km	MPC · JPL
765402	2013 VE_{45}	—	November 9, 2013	Haleakala	Pan-STARRS 1	EOS	1.4 km	MPC · JPL
765403	2013 VS_{45}	—	November 10, 2013	Mount Lemmon	Mount Lemmon Survey	·	2.1 km	MPC · JPL
765404	2013 VH_{46}	—	November 10, 2013	Mount Lemmon	Mount Lemmon Survey	·	1.6 km	MPC · JPL
765405	2013 VV_{46}	—	January 2, 2016	Mount Lemmon	Mount Lemmon Survey	L5	7.3 km	MPC · JPL
765406	2013 VF_{47}	—	November 9, 2013	Kitt Peak	Spacewatch	L5	7.8 km	MPC · JPL
765407	2013 VO_{47}	—	November 8, 2013	Mount Lemmon	Mount Lemmon Survey	·	1.8 km	MPC · JPL
765408	2013 VE_{48}	—	January 15, 2015	Haleakala	Pan-STARRS 1	EOS	1.3 km	MPC · JPL
765409	2013 VG_{48}	—	January 18, 2015	Mount Lemmon	Mount Lemmon Survey	·	2.4 km	MPC · JPL
765410	2013 VK_{48}	—	August 11, 2018	Haleakala	Pan-STARRS 1	·	2.1 km	MPC · JPL
765411	2013 VP_{48}	—	November 2, 2013	Mount Lemmon	Mount Lemmon Survey	·	1.6 km	MPC · JPL
765412	2013 VQ_{48}	—	November 11, 2013	Mount Lemmon	Mount Lemmon Survey	EOS	1.3 km	MPC · JPL
765413	2013 VU_{48}	—	December 21, 2014	Haleakala	Pan-STARRS 1	·	1.9 km	MPC · JPL
765414	2013 VY_{48}	—	October 23, 2013	Haleakala	Pan-STARRS 1	·	2.1 km	MPC · JPL
765415	2013 VA_{50}	—	November 2, 2013	Mount Lemmon	Mount Lemmon Survey	EOS	1.3 km	MPC · JPL
765416	2013 VJ_{50}	—	October 9, 2013	Mount Lemmon	Mount Lemmon Survey	·	1.8 km	MPC · JPL
765417	2013 VY_{50}	—	November 1, 2013	Kitt Peak	Spacewatch	·	3.3 km	MPC · JPL
765418	2013 VL_{51}	—	November 6, 2013	Haleakala	Pan-STARRS 1	·	2.6 km	MPC · JPL
765419	2013 VN_{51}	—	November 14, 2013	Mount Lemmon	Mount Lemmon Survey	·	1.4 km	MPC · JPL
765420	2013 VZ_{51}	—	November 9, 2013	Mount Lemmon	Mount Lemmon Survey	·	1.8 km	MPC · JPL
765421	2013 VB_{52}	—	November 12, 2013	Mount Lemmon	Mount Lemmon Survey	·	2.2 km	MPC · JPL
765422	2013 VS_{52}	—	November 9, 2013	Kitt Peak	Spacewatch	·	1.9 km	MPC · JPL
765423	2013 VB_{53}	—	November 2, 2013	Mount Lemmon	Mount Lemmon Survey	·	1.8 km	MPC · JPL
765424	2013 VH_{53}	—	November 10, 2013	Mount Lemmon	Mount Lemmon Survey	EOS	1.5 km	MPC · JPL
765425	2013 VR_{54}	—	November 9, 2013	Haleakala	Pan-STARRS 1	KOR	1.0 km	MPC · JPL
765426	2013 VT_{54}	—	November 2, 2013	Mount Lemmon	Mount Lemmon Survey	·	1.7 km	MPC · JPL
765427	2013 VX_{54}	—	November 9, 2013	Haleakala	Pan-STARRS 1	·	830 m	MPC · JPL
765428	2013 VB_{55}	—	November 2, 2013	Kitt Peak	Spacewatch	MAS	460 m	MPC · JPL
765429	2013 VF_{55}	—	November 1, 2013	Mount Lemmon	Mount Lemmon Survey	·	1.2 km	MPC · JPL
765430	2013 VX_{55}	—	November 4, 2013	Haleakala	Pan-STARRS 1	L5	7.6 km	MPC · JPL
765431	2013 VH_{56}	—	November 8, 2013	Kitt Peak	Spacewatch	·	840 m	MPC · JPL
765432	2013 VJ_{56}	—	November 1, 2013	Mount Lemmon	Mount Lemmon Survey	·	1.8 km	MPC · JPL
765433	2013 VP_{56}	—	November 4, 2013	Mount Lemmon	Mount Lemmon Survey	THM	2.1 km	MPC · JPL
765434	2013 VZ_{56}	—	November 9, 2013	Haleakala	Pan-STARRS 1	·	1.8 km	MPC · JPL
765435	2013 VA_{57}	—	November 9, 2013	Haleakala	Pan-STARRS 1	·	700 m	MPC · JPL
765436	2013 VD_{57}	—	November 9, 2013	Mount Lemmon	Mount Lemmon Survey	·	2.0 km	MPC · JPL
765437	2013 VS_{57}	—	November 12, 2013	Mount Lemmon	Mount Lemmon Survey	·	1.8 km	MPC · JPL
765438	2013 VT_{57}	—	November 8, 2013	Kitt Peak	Spacewatch	VER	1.9 km	MPC · JPL
765439	2013 VW_{57}	—	November 2, 2013	Mount Lemmon	Mount Lemmon Survey	MAS	510 m	MPC · JPL
765440	2013 VX_{57}	—	November 9, 2013	Kitt Peak	Spacewatch	·	2.2 km	MPC · JPL
765441	2013 VL_{58}	—	November 12, 2013	Kitt Peak	Spacewatch	EOS	1.4 km	MPC · JPL
765442	2013 VT_{59}	—	November 9, 2013	Mount Lemmon	Mount Lemmon Survey	·	2.4 km	MPC · JPL
765443	2013 VV_{59}	—	November 12, 2013	Mount Lemmon	Mount Lemmon Survey	·	690 m	MPC · JPL
765444	2013 VW_{59}	—	November 12, 2013	Mount Lemmon	Mount Lemmon Survey	·	890 m	MPC · JPL
765445	2013 VS_{60}	—	November 8, 2013	Mount Lemmon	Mount Lemmon Survey	·	2.1 km	MPC · JPL
765446	2013 VT_{60}	—	November 9, 2013	Haleakala	Pan-STARRS 1	·	2.5 km	MPC · JPL
765447	2013 VO_{61}	—	November 11, 2013	Mount Lemmon	Mount Lemmon Survey	·	720 m	MPC · JPL
765448	2013 VT_{61}	—	November 6, 2013	Haleakala	Pan-STARRS 1	EOS	1.3 km	MPC · JPL
765449	2013 VY_{64}	—	November 6, 2013	Haleakala	Pan-STARRS 1	·	2.5 km	MPC · JPL
765450	2013 VE_{65}	—	November 9, 2013	Kitt Peak	Spacewatch	·	2.3 km	MPC · JPL
765451	2013 VG_{65}	—	November 1, 2013	Mount Lemmon	Mount Lemmon Survey	·	1.5 km	MPC · JPL
765452	2013 VN_{65}	—	November 10, 2013	Mount Lemmon	Mount Lemmon Survey	·	1.6 km	MPC · JPL
765453	2013 VT_{65}	—	November 9, 2013	Haleakala	Pan-STARRS 1	VER	2.4 km	MPC · JPL
765454	2013 VY_{66}	—	November 9, 2013	Mount Lemmon	Mount Lemmon Survey	·	1.5 km	MPC · JPL
765455	2013 VA_{67}	—	November 8, 2013	Mount Lemmon	Mount Lemmon Survey	·	1.5 km	MPC · JPL
765456	2013 VB_{67}	—	November 8, 2013	Kitt Peak	Spacewatch	EOS	1.3 km	MPC · JPL
765457	2013 VB_{68}	—	November 2, 2013	Mount Lemmon	Mount Lemmon Survey	URS	2.4 km	MPC · JPL
765458	2013 VJ_{68}	—	November 12, 2013	Mount Lemmon	Mount Lemmon Survey	H	350 m	MPC · JPL
765459	2013 VP_{68}	—	November 9, 2013	Kitt Peak	Spacewatch	·	2.3 km	MPC · JPL
765460	2013 VQ_{69}	—	November 4, 2013	Mount Lemmon	Mount Lemmon Survey	·	1.7 km	MPC · JPL
765461	2013 VY_{69}	—	November 14, 2013	Mount Lemmon	Mount Lemmon Survey	·	2.4 km	MPC · JPL
765462	2013 VW_{70}	—	October 24, 2005	Mauna Kea	A. Boattini	·	1.4 km	MPC · JPL
765463	2013 VD_{71}	—	November 1, 2013	Mount Lemmon	Mount Lemmon Survey	WIT	710 m	MPC · JPL
765464	2013 VR_{72}	—	November 11, 2013	Oukaïmeden	M. Ory	·	2.2 km	MPC · JPL
765465	2013 VX_{72}	—	November 6, 2013	Haleakala	Pan-STARRS 1	H	360 m	MPC · JPL
765466	2013 VJ_{73}	—	November 10, 2013	Mount Lemmon	Mount Lemmon Survey	EOS	1.6 km	MPC · JPL
765467	2013 VU_{74}	—	November 14, 2013	Mount Lemmon	Mount Lemmon Survey	·	1.5 km	MPC · JPL
765468	2013 VW_{74}	—	November 6, 2013	XuYi	PMO NEO Survey Program	EUP	2.5 km	MPC · JPL
765469	2013 VD_{76}	—	November 9, 2013	Kitt Peak	Spacewatch	·	910 m	MPC · JPL
765470	2013 VF_{76}	—	November 1, 2013	Mount Lemmon	Mount Lemmon Survey	·	1.2 km	MPC · JPL
765471	2013 VG_{77}	—	November 1, 2013	Kitt Peak	Spacewatch	EOS	1.4 km	MPC · JPL
765472	2013 VA_{78}	—	November 9, 2013	Haleakala	Pan-STARRS 1	EOS	1.7 km	MPC · JPL
765473	2013 VD_{78}	—	November 9, 2013	Mount Lemmon	Mount Lemmon Survey	·	2.1 km	MPC · JPL
765474	2013 VK_{78}	—	November 9, 2013	Haleakala	Pan-STARRS 1	·	1.9 km	MPC · JPL
765475	2013 VX_{78}	—	November 4, 2013	Mount Lemmon	Mount Lemmon Survey	·	1.9 km	MPC · JPL
765476	2013 VH_{79}	—	November 1, 2013	Mount Lemmon	Mount Lemmon Survey	·	2.6 km	MPC · JPL
765477	2013 VM_{79}	—	November 9, 2013	Haleakala	Pan-STARRS 1	·	2.5 km	MPC · JPL
765478	2013 VV_{85}	—	November 8, 2013	Kitt Peak	Spacewatch	L5	8.0 km	MPC · JPL
765479	2013 VB_{86}	—	November 9, 2013	Haleakala	Pan-STARRS 1	·	1.9 km	MPC · JPL
765480	2013 VE_{86}	—	November 1, 2013	Mount Lemmon	Mount Lemmon Survey	·	2.5 km	MPC · JPL
765481	2013 VN_{86}	—	November 9, 2013	Haleakala	Pan-STARRS 1	L5	6.6 km	MPC · JPL
765482	2013 VQ_{87}	—	November 9, 2013	Haleakala	Pan-STARRS 1	L5	6.2 km	MPC · JPL
765483	2013 WH_{1}	—	November 2, 2013	Catalina	CSS	·	820 m	MPC · JPL
765484	2013 WW_{4}	—	October 6, 2013	Mount Lemmon	Mount Lemmon Survey	·	2.0 km	MPC · JPL
765485	2013 WH_{5}	—	November 2, 2013	Catalina	CSS	·	940 m	MPC · JPL
765486	2013 WD_{7}	—	November 20, 2006	Mount Lemmon	Mount Lemmon Survey	·	770 m	MPC · JPL
765487	2013 WN_{8}	—	November 26, 2013	Mount Lemmon	Mount Lemmon Survey	·	770 m	MPC · JPL
765488	2013 WD_{11}	—	November 9, 2013	Haleakala	Pan-STARRS 1	NYS	790 m	MPC · JPL
765489	2013 WT_{11}	—	November 26, 2013	Haleakala	Pan-STARRS 1	·	2.1 km	MPC · JPL
765490	2013 WK_{12}	—	October 26, 2013	Mount Lemmon	Mount Lemmon Survey	·	1.6 km	MPC · JPL
765491	2013 WY_{12}	—	November 27, 2013	Haleakala	Pan-STARRS 1	·	1.7 km	MPC · JPL
765492	2013 WD_{17}	—	January 18, 2009	Kitt Peak	Spacewatch	·	1.8 km	MPC · JPL
765493	2013 WG_{17}	—	November 27, 2013	Haleakala	Pan-STARRS 1	·	2.4 km	MPC · JPL
765494	2013 WN_{17}	—	October 15, 2007	Mount Lemmon	Mount Lemmon Survey	HYG	1.9 km	MPC · JPL
765495	2013 WH_{19}	—	August 18, 2009	Kitt Peak	Spacewatch	·	870 m	MPC · JPL
765496	2013 WN_{19}	—	November 27, 2013	Haleakala	Pan-STARRS 1	·	1.8 km	MPC · JPL
765497	2013 WJ_{23}	—	November 27, 2013	Haleakala	Pan-STARRS 1	·	2.4 km	MPC · JPL
765498	2013 WZ_{23}	—	November 6, 2013	Haleakala	Pan-STARRS 1	TIR	2.2 km	MPC · JPL
765499	2013 WU_{24}	—	November 27, 2013	Haleakala	Pan-STARRS 1	H	470 m	MPC · JPL
765500	2013 WR_{27}	—	November 22, 2006	Mount Lemmon	Mount Lemmon Survey	NYS	940 m	MPC · JPL

== 765501–765600 ==
back to top

Designation			Discovery			Properties		Ref
Permanent	Provisional	Named after	Date	Site	Discoverer(s)	Category	Diam.	Ref
765501	2013 WC_{33}	—	November 10, 2013	Kitt Peak	Spacewatch	MAS	560 m	MPC · JPL
765502	2013 WM_{33}	—	November 10, 2013	Kitt Peak	Spacewatch	·	2.7 km	MPC · JPL
765503	2013 WF_{34}	—	November 26, 2013	Haleakala	Pan-STARRS 1	·	2.2 km	MPC · JPL
765504	2013 WH_{38}	—	January 30, 2011	Mount Lemmon	Mount Lemmon Survey	·	820 m	MPC · JPL
765505	2013 WY_{38}	—	November 28, 2013	Kitt Peak	Spacewatch	·	2.3 km	MPC · JPL
765506	2013 WJ_{39}	—	November 28, 2013	Kitt Peak	Spacewatch	·	1.9 km	MPC · JPL
765507	2013 WM_{39}	—	November 28, 2013	Kitt Peak	Spacewatch	·	1.5 km	MPC · JPL
765508	2013 WS_{41}	—	November 2, 2013	Mount Lemmon	Mount Lemmon Survey	·	2.4 km	MPC · JPL
765509	2013 WP_{43}	—	November 28, 2013	Mount Lemmon	Mount Lemmon Survey	·	2.3 km	MPC · JPL
765510	2013 WZ_{48}	—	November 12, 2013	Mount Lemmon	Mount Lemmon Survey	·	2.0 km	MPC · JPL
765511	2013 WE_{49}	—	November 12, 2013	Mount Lemmon	Mount Lemmon Survey	·	1.9 km	MPC · JPL
765512	2013 WK_{50}	—	November 25, 2013	Haleakala	Pan-STARRS 1	·	2.3 km	MPC · JPL
765513	2013 WT_{52}	—	December 30, 2008	Mount Lemmon	Mount Lemmon Survey	·	2.2 km	MPC · JPL
765514	2013 WU_{53}	—	November 25, 2013	Haleakala	Pan-STARRS 1	·	2.1 km	MPC · JPL
765515	2013 WM_{57}	—	October 27, 2013	Kitt Peak	Spacewatch	·	870 m	MPC · JPL
765516	2013 WK_{60}	—	November 26, 2013	Mount Lemmon	Mount Lemmon Survey	·	1.7 km	MPC · JPL
765517	2013 WE_{65}	—	October 31, 2013	Kitt Peak	Spacewatch	·	600 m	MPC · JPL
765518	2013 WQ_{65}	—	November 10, 2013	Kitt Peak	Spacewatch	·	1.5 km	MPC · JPL
765519	2013 WL_{74}	—	June 7, 2016	Haleakala	Pan-STARRS 1	·	890 m	MPC · JPL
765520	2013 WC_{81}	—	November 1, 2013	Kitt Peak	Spacewatch	·	2.1 km	MPC · JPL
765521	2013 WM_{82}	—	September 12, 2005	Kitt Peak	Spacewatch	V	490 m	MPC · JPL
765522	2013 WZ_{84}	—	November 27, 2013	Haleakala	Pan-STARRS 1	·	810 m	MPC · JPL
765523	2013 WX_{89}	—	September 19, 1998	Apache Point	SDSS	·	670 m	MPC · JPL
765524	2013 WZ_{89}	—	November 28, 2013	Mount Lemmon	Mount Lemmon Survey	·	2.2 km	MPC · JPL
765525	2013 WD_{90}	—	November 28, 2013	Mount Lemmon	Mount Lemmon Survey	·	2.4 km	MPC · JPL
765526	2013 WJ_{90}	—	November 28, 2013	Mount Lemmon	Mount Lemmon Survey	·	1.8 km	MPC · JPL
765527	2013 WT_{92}	—	October 7, 2012	Haleakala	Pan-STARRS 1	·	2.3 km	MPC · JPL
765528	2013 WE_{93}	—	November 28, 2013	Mount Lemmon	Mount Lemmon Survey	·	1.4 km	MPC · JPL
765529	2013 WG_{95}	—	November 28, 2013	Mount Lemmon	Mount Lemmon Survey	·	3.2 km	MPC · JPL
765530	2013 WP_{97}	—	October 14, 2013	Mount Lemmon	Mount Lemmon Survey	·	840 m	MPC · JPL
765531	2013 WO_{98}	—	October 26, 2013	Mount Lemmon	Mount Lemmon Survey	·	2.1 km	MPC · JPL
765532	2013 WA_{100}	—	October 9, 2013	Mount Lemmon	Mount Lemmon Survey	ERI	1.0 km	MPC · JPL
765533	2013 WM_{100}	—	August 17, 2012	Haleakala	Pan-STARRS 1	·	2.1 km	MPC · JPL
765534	2013 WC_{102}	—	November 29, 2013	Mount Lemmon	Mount Lemmon Survey	EOS	1.5 km	MPC · JPL
765535	2013 WD_{105}	—	November 11, 2013	Mount Lemmon	Mount Lemmon Survey	·	870 m	MPC · JPL
765536	2013 WE_{105}	—	November 29, 2013	Haleakala	Pan-STARRS 1	·	2.1 km	MPC · JPL
765537	2013 WZ_{108}	—	January 31, 2004	Apache Point	SDSS	·	1.9 km	MPC · JPL
765538	2013 WD_{110}	—	October 25, 2013	Kitt Peak	Spacewatch	·	3.3 km	MPC · JPL
765539	2013 WK_{110}	—	November 5, 2005	Mount Lemmon	Mount Lemmon Survey	3:2	3.8 km	MPC · JPL
765540	2013 WG_{111}	—	September 30, 2009	Mount Lemmon	Mount Lemmon Survey	·	880 m	MPC · JPL
765541	2013 WD_{112}	—	November 27, 2013	Haleakala	Pan-STARRS 1	·	480 m	MPC · JPL
765542	2013 WH_{113}	—	November 29, 2013	Mount Lemmon	Mount Lemmon Survey	·	1.7 km	MPC · JPL
765543	2013 WG_{115}	—	November 27, 2013	Haleakala	Pan-STARRS 1	·	630 m	MPC · JPL
765544	2013 WT_{116}	—	November 29, 2013	Mount Lemmon	Mount Lemmon Survey	H	390 m	MPC · JPL
765545	2013 WP_{117}	—	November 27, 2013	Haleakala	Pan-STARRS 1	NEM	1.7 km	MPC · JPL
765546	2013 WS_{117}	—	November 28, 2013	Kitt Peak	Spacewatch	·	840 m	MPC · JPL
765547	2013 WH_{119}	—	November 29, 2013	Mount Lemmon	Mount Lemmon Survey	·	2.3 km	MPC · JPL
765548	2013 WT_{120}	—	November 27, 2013	Mount Lemmon	Mount Lemmon Survey	THB	2.5 km	MPC · JPL
765549	2013 WU_{120}	—	February 18, 2015	Mount Lemmon	Mount Lemmon Survey	·	2.1 km	MPC · JPL
765550	2013 WY_{120}	—	November 28, 2013	Kitt Peak	Spacewatch	·	2.1 km	MPC · JPL
765551	2013 WH_{121}	—	November 27, 2013	Haleakala	Pan-STARRS 1	EOS	1.3 km	MPC · JPL
765552	2013 WM_{121}	—	November 29, 2013	Mount Lemmon	Mount Lemmon Survey	·	1.6 km	MPC · JPL
765553	2013 WU_{121}	—	January 18, 2015	Haleakala	Pan-STARRS 1	·	2.7 km	MPC · JPL
765554	2013 WF_{122}	—	October 10, 2007	Mount Lemmon	Mount Lemmon Survey	·	1.9 km	MPC · JPL
765555	2013 WK_{122}	—	October 16, 2013	Mount Lemmon	Mount Lemmon Survey	·	1.6 km	MPC · JPL
765556	2013 WP_{122}	—	November 29, 2013	Haleakala	Pan-STARRS 1	·	2.0 km	MPC · JPL
765557	2013 WZ_{122}	—	November 28, 2013	Mount Lemmon	Mount Lemmon Survey	·	870 m	MPC · JPL
765558	2013 WB_{123}	—	November 27, 2013	Haleakala	Pan-STARRS 1	·	840 m	MPC · JPL
765559	2013 WN_{124}	—	January 27, 2015	Haleakala	Pan-STARRS 1	·	2.2 km	MPC · JPL
765560	2013 WU_{124}	—	October 18, 2018	Mount Lemmon	Mount Lemmon Survey	·	2.4 km	MPC · JPL
765561	2013 WY_{124}	—	November 27, 2013	Haleakala	Pan-STARRS 1	·	2.3 km	MPC · JPL
765562	2013 WZ_{124}	—	November 28, 2013	Mount Lemmon	Mount Lemmon Survey	·	1.5 km	MPC · JPL
765563	2013 WB_{125}	—	August 3, 2016	Haleakala	Pan-STARRS 1	·	820 m	MPC · JPL
765564	2013 WE_{125}	—	November 28, 2013	Mount Lemmon	Mount Lemmon Survey	·	2.2 km	MPC · JPL
765565	2013 WW_{125}	—	November 28, 2013	Mount Lemmon	Mount Lemmon Survey	·	1.9 km	MPC · JPL
765566	2013 WL_{126}	—	November 27, 2013	Haleakala	Pan-STARRS 1	HYG	1.7 km	MPC · JPL
765567	2013 WS_{126}	—	November 26, 2013	Haleakala	Pan-STARRS 1	·	1.3 km	MPC · JPL
765568	2013 WA_{127}	—	November 28, 2013	Mount Lemmon	Mount Lemmon Survey	·	1.5 km	MPC · JPL
765569	2013 WG_{127}	—	November 28, 2013	Mount Lemmon	Mount Lemmon Survey	·	1.6 km	MPC · JPL
765570	2013 WM_{127}	—	November 28, 2013	Kitt Peak	Spacewatch	(5651)	2.2 km	MPC · JPL
765571	2013 WO_{127}	—	November 28, 2013	Mount Lemmon	Mount Lemmon Survey	EOS	1.3 km	MPC · JPL
765572	2013 WT_{127}	—	November 28, 2013	Haleakala	Pan-STARRS 1	·	1.6 km	MPC · JPL
765573	2013 WV_{127}	—	November 27, 2013	Haleakala	Pan-STARRS 1	EOS	1.3 km	MPC · JPL
765574	2013 WW_{127}	—	November 27, 2013	Haleakala	Pan-STARRS 1	EOS	1.3 km	MPC · JPL
765575	2013 WE_{128}	—	November 27, 2013	Haleakala	Pan-STARRS 1	·	2.0 km	MPC · JPL
765576	2013 WM_{128}	—	November 28, 2013	Mount Lemmon	Mount Lemmon Survey	·	2.0 km	MPC · JPL
765577	2013 WQ_{128}	—	November 26, 2013	Haleakala	Pan-STARRS 1	·	2.0 km	MPC · JPL
765578	2013 WJ_{129}	—	November 29, 2013	Kitt Peak	Spacewatch	·	2.2 km	MPC · JPL
765579	2013 WO_{129}	—	November 26, 2013	Haleakala	Pan-STARRS 1	·	1.8 km	MPC · JPL
765580	2013 WB_{130}	—	November 27, 2013	Haleakala	Pan-STARRS 1	·	2.3 km	MPC · JPL
765581	2013 WC_{130}	—	November 29, 2013	Haleakala	Pan-STARRS 1	·	940 m	MPC · JPL
765582	2013 WE_{130}	—	November 27, 2013	Haleakala	Pan-STARRS 1	·	1.7 km	MPC · JPL
765583	2013 WW_{130}	—	November 26, 2013	Haleakala	Pan-STARRS 1	MAS	530 m	MPC · JPL
765584	2013 WA_{131}	—	November 28, 2013	Haleakala	Pan-STARRS 1	PHO	770 m	MPC · JPL
765585	2013 WB_{131}	—	November 28, 2013	Mount Lemmon	Mount Lemmon Survey	·	1.5 km	MPC · JPL
765586	2013 WU_{131}	—	November 30, 2013	XuYi	PMO NEO Survey Program	·	820 m	MPC · JPL
765587	2013 WW_{132}	—	November 28, 2013	Mount Lemmon	Mount Lemmon Survey	·	790 m	MPC · JPL
765588	2013 WH_{133}	—	November 28, 2013	Mount Lemmon	Mount Lemmon Survey	·	2.0 km	MPC · JPL
765589	2013 WN_{133}	—	November 27, 2013	Haleakala	Pan-STARRS 1	(29841)	1.2 km	MPC · JPL
765590	2013 WD_{135}	—	November 26, 2013	Mount Lemmon	Mount Lemmon Survey	·	1.8 km	MPC · JPL
765591	2013 WP_{135}	—	November 26, 2013	Haleakala	Pan-STARRS 1	TEL	1.0 km	MPC · JPL
765592	2013 WV_{135}	—	October 18, 2007	Kitt Peak	Spacewatch	·	1.8 km	MPC · JPL
765593	2013 WF_{136}	—	November 28, 2013	Mount Lemmon	Mount Lemmon Survey	3:2	4.1 km	MPC · JPL
765594	2013 WT_{136}	—	November 26, 2013	Haleakala	Pan-STARRS 1	·	2.2 km	MPC · JPL
765595	2013 WX_{136}	—	November 27, 2013	Haleakala	Pan-STARRS 1	H	410 m	MPC · JPL
765596	2013 WY_{137}	—	November 27, 2013	Haleakala	Pan-STARRS 1	·	1.5 km	MPC · JPL
765597	2013 WH_{138}	—	November 27, 2013	Haleakala	Pan-STARRS 1	·	1.6 km	MPC · JPL
765598	2013 WP_{139}	—	November 27, 2013	Haleakala	Pan-STARRS 1	H	420 m	MPC · JPL
765599	2013 WP_{140}	—	November 27, 2013	Haleakala	Pan-STARRS 1	·	750 m	MPC · JPL
765600	2013 WZ_{141}	—	November 27, 2013	Haleakala	Pan-STARRS 1	·	2.2 km	MPC · JPL

== 765601–765700 ==
back to top

Designation			Discovery			Properties		Ref
Permanent	Provisional	Named after	Date	Site	Discoverer(s)	Category	Diam.	Ref
765601	2013 WQ_{143}	—	November 26, 2013	Haleakala	Pan-STARRS 1	HOF	2.3 km	MPC · JPL
765602	2013 WX_{144}	—	November 27, 2013	Haleakala	Pan-STARRS 1	·	1.8 km	MPC · JPL
765603	2013 WD_{145}	—	November 27, 2013	Haleakala	Pan-STARRS 1	·	2.2 km	MPC · JPL
765604	2013 WF_{145}	—	November 26, 2013	Haleakala	Pan-STARRS 1	·	2.0 km	MPC · JPL
765605	2013 WH_{145}	—	November 27, 2013	Haleakala	Pan-STARRS 1	·	1.9 km	MPC · JPL
765606	2013 WJ_{145}	—	November 28, 2013	Mount Lemmon	Mount Lemmon Survey	·	2.4 km	MPC · JPL
765607	2013 WA_{147}	—	November 28, 2013	Mount Lemmon	Mount Lemmon Survey	·	1.7 km	MPC · JPL
765608	2013 WP_{148}	—	November 28, 2013	Haleakala	Pan-STARRS 1	·	2.1 km	MPC · JPL
765609	2013 WW_{148}	—	November 27, 2013	Haleakala	Pan-STARRS 1	·	2.3 km	MPC · JPL
765610	2013 WY_{148}	—	November 28, 2013	Mount Lemmon	Mount Lemmon Survey	·	2.4 km	MPC · JPL
765611	2013 XV	—	October 9, 2013	Mount Lemmon	Mount Lemmon Survey	·	760 m	MPC · JPL
765612	2013 XJ_{1}	—	February 25, 2007	Mount Lemmon	Mount Lemmon Survey	MAS	540 m	MPC · JPL
765613	2013 XS_{5}	—	November 30, 2008	Kitt Peak	Spacewatch	·	1.9 km	MPC · JPL
765614	2013 XL_{9}	—	December 4, 2013	Haleakala	Pan-STARRS 1	H	480 m	MPC · JPL
765615	2013 XS_{14}	—	November 27, 2013	Haleakala	Pan-STARRS 1	HOF	1.8 km	MPC · JPL
765616	2013 XW_{14}	—	November 28, 2013	Mount Lemmon	Mount Lemmon Survey	EOS	1.5 km	MPC · JPL
765617	2013 XX_{14}	—	November 27, 2013	Haleakala	Pan-STARRS 1	EOS	1.3 km	MPC · JPL
765618	2013 XS_{17}	—	December 7, 2013	Kitt Peak	Spacewatch	·	790 m	MPC · JPL
765619	2013 XC_{20}	—	November 1, 2013	Mount Lemmon	Mount Lemmon Survey	THB	2.6 km	MPC · JPL
765620	2013 XC_{24}	—	November 9, 2013	Haleakala	Pan-STARRS 1	EOS	1.4 km	MPC · JPL
765621	2013 XM_{27}	—	January 11, 2010	Mount Lemmon	Mount Lemmon Survey	·	1.3 km	MPC · JPL
765622	2013 XN_{29}	—	January 20, 2015	Haleakala	Pan-STARRS 1	·	1.7 km	MPC · JPL
765623	2013 XZ_{30}	—	December 10, 2013	Mount Lemmon	Mount Lemmon Survey	·	930 m	MPC · JPL
765624	2013 XC_{31}	—	December 6, 2013	Haleakala	Pan-STARRS 1	EUP	2.6 km	MPC · JPL
765625	2013 XR_{31}	—	December 8, 2013	Tincana	Zolnowski, M., Kusiak, M.	·	760 m	MPC · JPL
765626	2013 XV_{31}	—	December 14, 2013	Mount Lemmon	Mount Lemmon Survey	·	3.3 km	MPC · JPL
765627	2013 XM_{32}	—	December 11, 2013	Haleakala	Pan-STARRS 1	·	2.0 km	MPC · JPL
765628	2013 XQ_{32}	—	December 6, 2013	Haleakala	Pan-STARRS 1	LIX	2.5 km	MPC · JPL
765629	2013 XS_{32}	—	December 13, 2013	Mount Lemmon	Mount Lemmon Survey	·	2.0 km	MPC · JPL
765630	2013 XU_{32}	—	February 16, 2015	Haleakala	Pan-STARRS 1	EOS	1.3 km	MPC · JPL
765631	2013 XY_{32}	—	December 6, 2013	Haleakala	Pan-STARRS 1	·	1.6 km	MPC · JPL
765632	2013 XN_{33}	—	December 4, 2013	Haleakala	Pan-STARRS 1	EOS	1.5 km	MPC · JPL
765633	2013 XW_{33}	—	December 11, 2013	Haleakala	Pan-STARRS 1	·	2.5 km	MPC · JPL
765634	2013 XY_{33}	—	September 1, 2017	Haleakala	Pan-STARRS 1	MAR	780 m	MPC · JPL
765635	2013 XB_{34}	—	August 27, 2016	Haleakala	Pan-STARRS 1	·	960 m	MPC · JPL
765636	2013 XE_{34}	—	December 11, 2013	Haleakala	Pan-STARRS 1	·	2.0 km	MPC · JPL
765637	2013 XL_{34}	—	October 2, 2016	Mount Lemmon	Mount Lemmon Survey	·	870 m	MPC · JPL
765638	2013 XA_{35}	—	November 12, 2013	Mount Lemmon	Mount Lemmon Survey	EOS	1.3 km	MPC · JPL
765639	2013 XS_{35}	—	December 4, 2013	Haleakala	Pan-STARRS 1	·	2.0 km	MPC · JPL
765640	2013 XY_{35}	—	December 3, 2013	Haleakala	Pan-STARRS 1	·	1.9 km	MPC · JPL
765641	2013 XQ_{36}	—	December 4, 2013	Haleakala	Pan-STARRS 1	NYS	810 m	MPC · JPL
765642	2013 XM_{37}	—	December 11, 2013	Mount Lemmon	Mount Lemmon Survey	·	2.4 km	MPC · JPL
765643	2013 XO_{37}	—	December 11, 2013	Haleakala	Pan-STARRS 1	·	800 m	MPC · JPL
765644	2013 XQ_{38}	—	December 13, 2013	Mount Lemmon	Mount Lemmon Survey	·	2.7 km	MPC · JPL
765645	2013 XP_{40}	—	December 7, 2013	Haleakala	Pan-STARRS 1	·	2.9 km	MPC · JPL
765646	2013 XA_{41}	—	December 7, 2013	Mount Lemmon	Mount Lemmon Survey	·	1.3 km	MPC · JPL
765647	2013 XU_{41}	—	October 25, 2009	Kitt Peak	Spacewatch	·	730 m	MPC · JPL
765648	2013 XA_{43}	—	December 4, 2013	Haleakala	Pan-STARRS 1	·	2.4 km	MPC · JPL
765649	2013 YV_{2}	—	December 29, 2008	Mount Lemmon	Mount Lemmon Survey	·	2.1 km	MPC · JPL
765650	2013 YD_{3}	—	December 22, 2013	Haleakala	Pan-STARRS 1	·	2.4 km	MPC · JPL
765651	2013 YL_{7}	—	December 24, 2013	Mount Lemmon	Mount Lemmon Survey	PHO	780 m	MPC · JPL
765652	2013 YS_{8}	—	December 24, 2013	Mount Lemmon	Mount Lemmon Survey	·	2.2 km	MPC · JPL
765653	2013 YH_{9}	—	December 24, 2013	Mount Lemmon	Mount Lemmon Survey	·	2.2 km	MPC · JPL
765654	2013 YF_{12}	—	November 2, 2013	Mount Lemmon	Mount Lemmon Survey	·	2.3 km	MPC · JPL
765655	2013 YR_{12}	—	January 31, 2009	Mount Lemmon	Mount Lemmon Survey	VER	2.2 km	MPC · JPL
765656	2013 YP_{15}	—	October 31, 2013	Mount Lemmon	Mount Lemmon Survey	·	1.7 km	MPC · JPL
765657	2013 YR_{17}	—	December 14, 2013	Mount Lemmon	Mount Lemmon Survey	EUP	3.0 km	MPC · JPL
765658	2013 YP_{18}	—	December 25, 2013	Kitt Peak	Spacewatch	URS	3.0 km	MPC · JPL
765659	2013 YL_{25}	—	October 26, 2013	Mount Lemmon	Mount Lemmon Survey	·	1.7 km	MPC · JPL
765660	2013 YS_{27}	—	December 23, 2013	Mount Lemmon	Mount Lemmon Survey	·	2.0 km	MPC · JPL
765661	2013 YB_{32}	—	October 3, 2013	Kitt Peak	Spacewatch	·	3.0 km	MPC · JPL
765662	2013 YM_{36}	—	December 7, 2013	Haleakala	Pan-STARRS 1	PHO	630 m	MPC · JPL
765663	2013 YZ_{36}	—	February 1, 2009	Kitt Peak	Spacewatch	·	1.8 km	MPC · JPL
765664	2013 YK_{39}	—	December 10, 2013	Mount Lemmon	Mount Lemmon Survey	·	2.2 km	MPC · JPL
765665	2013 YW_{39}	—	December 24, 2013	Mount Lemmon	Mount Lemmon Survey	LIX	3.1 km	MPC · JPL
765666	2013 YH_{41}	—	December 25, 2013	Mount Lemmon	Mount Lemmon Survey	·	910 m	MPC · JPL
765667	2013 YC_{42}	—	March 10, 2011	Kitt Peak	Spacewatch	·	690 m	MPC · JPL
765668	2013 YE_{44}	—	December 26, 2013	Haleakala	Pan-STARRS 1	·	970 m	MPC · JPL
765669	2013 YH_{44}	—	February 2, 2009	Kitt Peak	Spacewatch	·	1.7 km	MPC · JPL
765670	2013 YF_{45}	—	December 11, 2013	Mount Lemmon	Mount Lemmon Survey	·	2.1 km	MPC · JPL
765671	2013 YY_{45}	—	November 18, 2007	Mount Lemmon	Mount Lemmon Survey	·	2.2 km	MPC · JPL
765672	2013 YB_{46}	—	December 27, 2013	Kitt Peak	Spacewatch	·	2.0 km	MPC · JPL
765673	2013 YC_{49}	—	November 9, 2013	Mount Lemmon	Mount Lemmon Survey	·	1.8 km	MPC · JPL
765674	2013 YY_{51}	—	November 28, 2013	Kitt Peak	Spacewatch	·	2.2 km	MPC · JPL
765675	2013 YF_{52}	—	November 27, 2013	Haleakala	Pan-STARRS 1	·	2.7 km	MPC · JPL
765676	2013 YN_{62}	—	December 27, 2013	Kitt Peak	Spacewatch	·	2.2 km	MPC · JPL
765677	2013 YU_{62}	—	December 27, 2013	Kitt Peak	Spacewatch	·	990 m	MPC · JPL
765678	2013 YJ_{67}	—	December 30, 2013	Mount Lemmon	Mount Lemmon Survey	V	560 m	MPC · JPL
765679	2013 YH_{70}	—	December 30, 2013	Mount Lemmon	Mount Lemmon Survey	·	1.4 km	MPC · JPL
765680	2013 YC_{71}	—	February 8, 2007	Mount Lemmon	Mount Lemmon Survey	NYS	850 m	MPC · JPL
765681	2013 YM_{73}	—	December 25, 2013	Kitt Peak	Spacewatch	·	990 m	MPC · JPL
765682	2013 YL_{76}	—	September 18, 2003	Kitt Peak	Spacewatch	GEF	840 m	MPC · JPL
765683	2013 YK_{77}	—	December 27, 2013	Kitt Peak	Spacewatch	·	2.1 km	MPC · JPL
765684	2013 YT_{78}	—	December 4, 2013	Haleakala	Pan-STARRS 1	·	2.1 km	MPC · JPL
765685	2013 YU_{79}	—	December 28, 2013	Kitt Peak	Spacewatch	·	2.2 km	MPC · JPL
765686	2013 YO_{80}	—	December 28, 2013	Kitt Peak	Spacewatch	·	770 m	MPC · JPL
765687	2013 YP_{80}	—	October 26, 2008	Cerro Tololo	Wasserman, L. H.	HNS	740 m	MPC · JPL
765688	2013 YJ_{81}	—	December 28, 2013	Kitt Peak	Spacewatch	·	920 m	MPC · JPL
765689	2013 YD_{84}	—	December 28, 2013	Kitt Peak	Spacewatch	URS	2.8 km	MPC · JPL
765690	2013 YK_{85}	—	December 28, 2013	Kitt Peak	Spacewatch	LUT	2.9 km	MPC · JPL
765691	2013 YB_{86}	—	December 28, 2013	Kitt Peak	Spacewatch	·	1.0 km	MPC · JPL
765692	2013 YU_{86}	—	December 28, 2013	Kitt Peak	Spacewatch	·	2.6 km	MPC · JPL
765693	2013 YL_{87}	—	December 28, 2013	Kitt Peak	Spacewatch	·	930 m	MPC · JPL
765694	2013 YA_{89}	—	December 28, 2013	Kitt Peak	Spacewatch	LIX	2.5 km	MPC · JPL
765695	2013 YT_{93}	—	December 30, 2013	Kitt Peak	Spacewatch	·	2.3 km	MPC · JPL
765696	2013 YY_{94}	—	December 30, 2013	Kitt Peak	Spacewatch	·	1.2 km	MPC · JPL
765697	2013 YB_{96}	—	December 30, 2013	Kitt Peak	Spacewatch	·	2.3 km	MPC · JPL
765698	2013 YD_{96}	—	November 20, 2009	Kitt Peak	Spacewatch	NYS	810 m	MPC · JPL
765699	2013 YX_{98}	—	December 31, 2013	Kitt Peak	Spacewatch	·	2.0 km	MPC · JPL
765700	2013 YY_{98}	—	March 2, 2009	Catalina	CSS	·	2.2 km	MPC · JPL

== 765701–765800 ==
back to top

Designation			Discovery			Properties		Ref
Permanent	Provisional	Named after	Date	Site	Discoverer(s)	Category	Diam.	Ref
765701	2013 YB_{99}	—	September 12, 1996	La Silla	Uppsala-DLR Trojan Survey	·	1.2 km	MPC · JPL
765702	2013 YX_{99}	—	December 31, 2013	Kitt Peak	Spacewatch	V	520 m	MPC · JPL
765703	2013 YT_{101}	—	December 31, 2013	Mount Lemmon	Mount Lemmon Survey	·	2.0 km	MPC · JPL
765704	2013 YH_{102}	—	December 2, 2008	Catalina	CSS	·	2.0 km	MPC · JPL
765705	2013 YQ_{103}	—	October 30, 2013	Kitt Peak	Spacewatch	HYG	2.4 km	MPC · JPL
765706	2013 YC_{105}	—	December 28, 2013	Kitt Peak	Spacewatch	·	2.4 km	MPC · JPL
765707	2013 YP_{105}	—	November 11, 2013	Mount Lemmon	Mount Lemmon Survey	·	2.2 km	MPC · JPL
765708	2013 YU_{107}	—	August 27, 2009	Kitt Peak	Spacewatch	·	680 m	MPC · JPL
765709	2013 YH_{112}	—	October 19, 2006	Kitt Peak	Deep Ecliptic Survey	·	1.8 km	MPC · JPL
765710	2013 YF_{113}	—	November 20, 2009	Kitt Peak	Spacewatch	·	900 m	MPC · JPL
765711	2013 YO_{115}	—	December 30, 2013	Kitt Peak	Spacewatch	·	2.6 km	MPC · JPL
765712	2013 YL_{122}	—	November 9, 2007	Mount Lemmon	Mount Lemmon Survey	·	1.8 km	MPC · JPL
765713	2013 YN_{123}	—	December 30, 2013	Kitt Peak	Spacewatch	·	1.9 km	MPC · JPL
765714	2013 YR_{125}	—	December 30, 2013	Kitt Peak	Spacewatch	·	860 m	MPC · JPL
765715	2013 YU_{128}	—	December 30, 2013	Mount Lemmon	Mount Lemmon Survey	·	2.2 km	MPC · JPL
765716	2013 YH_{129}	—	December 31, 2013	Kitt Peak	Spacewatch	EUP	3.1 km	MPC · JPL
765717	2013 YB_{136}	—	December 31, 2013	Mount Lemmon	Mount Lemmon Survey	·	2.1 km	MPC · JPL
765718	2013 YP_{136}	—	December 31, 2013	Mount Lemmon	Mount Lemmon Survey	·	1.9 km	MPC · JPL
765719	2013 YX_{137}	—	December 31, 2013	Mount Lemmon	Mount Lemmon Survey	·	1.8 km	MPC · JPL
765720	2013 YC_{138}	—	November 8, 2008	Kitt Peak	Spacewatch	·	1.4 km	MPC · JPL
765721	2013 YU_{138}	—	October 19, 2007	Catalina	CSS	EOS	1.5 km	MPC · JPL
765722	2013 YX_{138}	—	December 6, 2013	Haleakala	Pan-STARRS 1	·	1.9 km	MPC · JPL
765723	2013 YJ_{141}	—	August 27, 2009	Kitt Peak	Spacewatch	MAS	540 m	MPC · JPL
765724	2013 YO_{143}	—	December 3, 2013	Mount Lemmon	Mount Lemmon Survey	·	2.3 km	MPC · JPL
765725	2013 YQ_{148}	—	December 31, 2013	Haleakala	Pan-STARRS 1	·	1.4 km	MPC · JPL
765726	2013 YL_{149}	—	December 22, 2013	Haleakala	Pan-STARRS 1	·	2.5 km	MPC · JPL
765727	2013 YH_{152}	—	February 4, 2003	Kitt Peak	Spacewatch	·	1.9 km	MPC · JPL
765728	2013 YH_{154}	—	December 27, 2013	Kitt Peak	Spacewatch	·	1.1 km	MPC · JPL
765729	2013 YM_{154}	—	August 25, 2012	Kitt Peak	Spacewatch	·	1.9 km	MPC · JPL
765730	2013 YW_{154}	—	December 31, 2013	Haleakala	Pan-STARRS 1	·	2.5 km	MPC · JPL
765731	2013 YY_{157}	—	December 31, 2013	Mount Lemmon	Mount Lemmon Survey	(1118)	2.2 km	MPC · JPL
765732	2013 YU_{158}	—	December 30, 2013	Oukaïmeden	M. Ory	PHO	870 m	MPC · JPL
765733	2013 YW_{158}	—	December 23, 2013	Mount Lemmon	Mount Lemmon Survey	·	2.4 km	MPC · JPL
765734	2013 YX_{158}	—	December 28, 2013	Mount Lemmon	Mount Lemmon Survey	·	1.0 km	MPC · JPL
765735	2013 YM_{159}	—	December 24, 2013	Nogales	J.-C. Merlin	·	2.0 km	MPC · JPL
765736	2013 YU_{159}	—	March 30, 2015	Haleakala	Pan-STARRS 1	·	920 m	MPC · JPL
765737	2013 YK_{160}	—	December 28, 2013	Mount Lemmon	Mount Lemmon Survey	H	450 m	MPC · JPL
765738	2013 YG_{161}	—	January 16, 2015	Haleakala	Pan-STARRS 1	·	2.0 km	MPC · JPL
765739	2013 YH_{161}	—	January 22, 2015	Haleakala	Pan-STARRS 1	URS	2.5 km	MPC · JPL
765740	2013 YO_{161}	—	December 25, 2013	Kitt Peak	Spacewatch	MAS	500 m	MPC · JPL
765741	2013 YD_{162}	—	December 30, 2013	Mount Lemmon	Mount Lemmon Survey	·	2.2 km	MPC · JPL
765742	2013 YP_{162}	—	December 25, 2013	Mount Lemmon	Mount Lemmon Survey	·	2.1 km	MPC · JPL
765743	2013 YW_{162}	—	December 31, 2013	Haleakala	Pan-STARRS 1	·	2.9 km	MPC · JPL
765744	2013 YL_{163}	—	December 24, 2013	Mount Lemmon	Mount Lemmon Survey	·	1.7 km	MPC · JPL
765745	2013 YB_{164}	—	December 31, 2013	Kitt Peak	Spacewatch	·	1.9 km	MPC · JPL
765746	2013 YD_{164}	—	December 24, 2013	Mount Lemmon	Mount Lemmon Survey	·	2.3 km	MPC · JPL
765747	2013 YE_{164}	—	December 25, 2013	Mount Lemmon	Mount Lemmon Survey	·	1.1 km	MPC · JPL
765748	2013 YF_{164}	—	December 31, 2013	Haleakala	Pan-STARRS 1	CLA	1.1 km	MPC · JPL
765749	2013 YS_{164}	—	December 31, 2013	Haleakala	Pan-STARRS 1	PHO	570 m	MPC · JPL
765750	2013 YN_{165}	—	December 31, 2013	Mount Lemmon	Mount Lemmon Survey	V	390 m	MPC · JPL
765751	2013 YC_{167}	—	December 27, 2013	Mount Lemmon	Mount Lemmon Survey	·	2.1 km	MPC · JPL
765752	2013 YO_{167}	—	December 24, 2013	Mount Lemmon	Mount Lemmon Survey	·	2.0 km	MPC · JPL
765753	2013 YL_{170}	—	December 30, 2013	Kitt Peak	Spacewatch	·	2.5 km	MPC · JPL
765754	2013 YZ_{170}	—	December 25, 2013	Kitt Peak	Spacewatch	·	870 m	MPC · JPL
765755	2013 YR_{171}	—	April 16, 2007	Mount Lemmon	Mount Lemmon Survey	·	980 m	MPC · JPL
765756	2013 YH_{172}	—	December 30, 2013	Mount Lemmon	Mount Lemmon Survey	EOS	1.3 km	MPC · JPL
765757	2014 AB_{1}	—	January 1, 2014	Haleakala	Pan-STARRS 1	·	920 m	MPC · JPL
765758	2014 AG_{2}	—	December 14, 2013	Mount Lemmon	Mount Lemmon Survey	·	2.1 km	MPC · JPL
765759	2014 AQ_{8}	—	January 1, 2014	Haleakala	Pan-STARRS 1	·	930 m	MPC · JPL
765760	2014 AH_{9}	—	March 1, 2009	Kitt Peak	Spacewatch	THM	1.6 km	MPC · JPL
765761	2014 AV_{9}	—	September 14, 2012	Mount Lemmon	Mount Lemmon Survey	·	2.5 km	MPC · JPL
765762	2014 AM_{13}	—	December 4, 2013	Haleakala	Pan-STARRS 1	·	2.2 km	MPC · JPL
765763	2014 AP_{18}	—	January 1, 2014	Haleakala	Pan-STARRS 1	·	2.2 km	MPC · JPL
765764	2014 AN_{20}	—	January 2, 2014	Kitt Peak	Spacewatch	LIX	2.2 km	MPC · JPL
765765	2014 AR_{25}	—	January 3, 2014	Kitt Peak	Spacewatch	·	610 m	MPC · JPL
765766	2014 AT_{25}	—	January 3, 2014	Kitt Peak	Spacewatch	URS	3.0 km	MPC · JPL
765767	2014 AB_{26}	—	January 3, 2014	Kitt Peak	Spacewatch	·	2.4 km	MPC · JPL
765768	2014 AC_{26}	—	November 11, 2009	Kitt Peak	Spacewatch	·	720 m	MPC · JPL
765769	2014 AT_{26}	—	December 3, 2013	Oukaïmeden	M. Ory	·	1.8 km	MPC · JPL
765770	2014 AC_{27}	—	January 4, 2014	Mount Lemmon	Mount Lemmon Survey	H	500 m	MPC · JPL
765771	2014 AA_{30}	—	March 20, 2007	Mount Lemmon	Mount Lemmon Survey	·	910 m	MPC · JPL
765772	2014 AQ_{35}	—	January 2, 2009	Kitt Peak	Spacewatch	·	1.8 km	MPC · JPL
765773	2014 AV_{35}	—	December 27, 2006	Mount Lemmon	Mount Lemmon Survey	NYS	760 m	MPC · JPL
765774	2014 AJ_{36}	—	December 24, 2013	Mount Lemmon	Mount Lemmon Survey	·	3.1 km	MPC · JPL
765775	2014 AF_{37}	—	December 24, 2013	Mount Lemmon	Mount Lemmon Survey	·	940 m	MPC · JPL
765776	2014 AA_{38}	—	December 14, 2013	Mount Lemmon	Mount Lemmon Survey	·	900 m	MPC · JPL
765777	2014 AO_{45}	—	October 25, 2009	Kitt Peak	Spacewatch	NYS	690 m	MPC · JPL
765778	2014 AX_{47}	—	August 10, 2012	Kitt Peak	Spacewatch	·	2.5 km	MPC · JPL
765779	2014 AE_{48}	—	January 7, 2014	Kitt Peak	Spacewatch	·	920 m	MPC · JPL
765780	2014 AJ_{52}	—	January 3, 2014	Mount Lemmon	Mount Lemmon Survey	TIR	2.0 km	MPC · JPL
765781	2014 AG_{54}	—	January 9, 2014	Haleakala	Pan-STARRS 1	H	370 m	MPC · JPL
765782	2014 AH_{56}	—	January 1, 2014	Kitt Peak	Spacewatch	THB	2.3 km	MPC · JPL
765783	2014 AP_{56}	—	January 9, 2014	Kitt Peak	Spacewatch	·	800 m	MPC · JPL
765784	2014 AV_{56}	—	January 12, 2014	Mount Lemmon	Mount Lemmon Survey	·	2.4 km	MPC · JPL
765785	2014 AG_{58}	—	January 1, 2014	Kitt Peak	Spacewatch	·	820 m	MPC · JPL
765786	2014 AA_{62}	—	January 2, 2014	Mount Lemmon	Mount Lemmon Survey	·	2.1 km	MPC · JPL
765787	2014 AA_{64}	—	January 9, 2014	Kitt Peak	Spacewatch	·	2.1 km	MPC · JPL
765788	2014 AS_{64}	—	January 9, 2014	Haleakala	Pan-STARRS 1	·	1.0 km	MPC · JPL
765789	2014 AQ_{65}	—	March 28, 2015	Haleakala	Pan-STARRS 1	·	1.1 km	MPC · JPL
765790	2014 AT_{65}	—	September 18, 1995	Kitt Peak	Spacewatch	·	2.2 km	MPC · JPL
765791	2014 AU_{65}	—	January 1, 2014	Kitt Peak	Spacewatch	·	2.1 km	MPC · JPL
765792	2014 AW_{65}	—	January 7, 2014	Mount Lemmon	Mount Lemmon Survey	TIR	2.0 km	MPC · JPL
765793	2014 AH_{66}	—	January 9, 2014	Haleakala	Pan-STARRS 1	PHO	1.1 km	MPC · JPL
765794	2014 AQ_{66}	—	August 1, 2016	Haleakala	Pan-STARRS 1	·	1.1 km	MPC · JPL
765795	2014 AZ_{66}	—	January 4, 2014	Mount Lemmon	Mount Lemmon Survey	·	2.4 km	MPC · JPL
765796	2014 AL_{67}	—	January 2, 2014	Catalina	CSS	·	3.6 km	MPC · JPL
765797	2014 AM_{67}	—	January 27, 2015	Haleakala	Pan-STARRS 1	EOS	1.3 km	MPC · JPL
765798	2014 AX_{67}	—	January 10, 2014	Mount Lemmon	Mount Lemmon Survey	LIX	2.5 km	MPC · JPL
765799	2014 AF_{70}	—	January 1, 2014	Kitt Peak	Spacewatch	·	860 m	MPC · JPL
765800	2014 AG_{70}	—	January 4, 2014	Haleakala	Pan-STARRS 1	·	2.4 km	MPC · JPL

== 765801–765900 ==
back to top

Designation			Discovery			Properties		Ref
Permanent	Provisional	Named after	Date	Site	Discoverer(s)	Category	Diam.	Ref
765801	2014 AE_{71}	—	January 3, 2014	Mount Lemmon	Mount Lemmon Survey	·	2.9 km	MPC · JPL
765802	2014 AL_{71}	—	January 9, 2014	Mount Lemmon	Mount Lemmon Survey	EUN	790 m	MPC · JPL
765803	2014 AM_{71}	—	January 10, 2014	Mount Lemmon	Mount Lemmon Survey	·	2.5 km	MPC · JPL
765804	2014 AO_{71}	—	January 1, 2014	Haleakala	Pan-STARRS 1	·	950 m	MPC · JPL
765805	2014 AS_{71}	—	January 10, 2014	Mount Lemmon	Mount Lemmon Survey	EOS	1.3 km	MPC · JPL
765806	2014 AT_{71}	—	January 9, 2014	Kitt Peak	Spacewatch	·	2.2 km	MPC · JPL
765807	2014 AP_{73}	—	January 10, 2014	Mount Lemmon	Mount Lemmon Survey	·	2.1 km	MPC · JPL
765808	2014 AU_{73}	—	January 1, 2014	Haleakala	Pan-STARRS 1	·	2.1 km	MPC · JPL
765809	2014 AY_{73}	—	January 29, 2003	Apache Point	SDSS	·	2.3 km	MPC · JPL
765810	2014 AA_{74}	—	January 3, 2014	Kitt Peak	Spacewatch	·	1.9 km	MPC · JPL
765811	2014 AD_{74}	—	January 3, 2014	Mount Lemmon	Mount Lemmon Survey	·	2.0 km	MPC · JPL
765812	2014 AH_{74}	—	January 10, 2014	Kitt Peak	Spacewatch	·	1.8 km	MPC · JPL
765813	2014 AJ_{74}	—	January 3, 2014	Kitt Peak	Spacewatch	·	2.4 km	MPC · JPL
765814	2014 AN_{75}	—	January 1, 2014	Haleakala	Pan-STARRS 1	·	1.8 km	MPC · JPL
765815	2014 AH_{76}	—	January 5, 2014	Haleakala	Pan-STARRS 1	·	1.8 km	MPC · JPL
765816	2014 AQ_{77}	—	October 21, 2012	Mount Lemmon	Mount Lemmon Survey	·	2.0 km	MPC · JPL
765817	2014 AL_{78}	—	January 1, 2014	Haleakala	Pan-STARRS 1	TRE	1.9 km	MPC · JPL
765818	2014 AS_{78}	—	January 1, 2014	Haleakala	Pan-STARRS 1	EOS	1.5 km	MPC · JPL
765819	2014 AC_{79}	—	September 12, 2012	Kislovodsk	ISON-Kislovodsk Observatory	·	2.4 km	MPC · JPL
765820	2014 AR_{79}	—	January 1, 2014	Mount Lemmon	Mount Lemmon Survey	·	2.1 km	MPC · JPL
765821	2014 BB_{2}	—	October 22, 2009	Mount Lemmon	Mount Lemmon Survey	MAS	590 m	MPC · JPL
765822	2014 BA_{4}	—	January 1, 2014	Haleakala	Pan-STARRS 1	·	750 m	MPC · JPL
765823	2014 BM_{5}	—	April 16, 2004	Apache Point	SDSS	·	2.3 km	MPC · JPL
765824	2014 BX_{5}	—	December 30, 2013	Mount Lemmon	Mount Lemmon Survey	·	2.0 km	MPC · JPL
765825	2014 BH_{6}	—	December 4, 2007	Kitt Peak	Spacewatch	THM	1.8 km	MPC · JPL
765826	2014 BT_{6}	—	December 30, 2013	Mount Lemmon	Mount Lemmon Survey	·	2.1 km	MPC · JPL
765827	2014 BX_{6}	—	December 30, 2013	Mount Lemmon	Mount Lemmon Survey	NYS	940 m	MPC · JPL
765828	2014 BL_{7}	—	December 20, 2007	Mount Lemmon	Mount Lemmon Survey	·	2.4 km	MPC · JPL
765829	2014 BS_{11}	—	May 26, 2011	Mount Lemmon	Mount Lemmon Survey	·	890 m	MPC · JPL
765830	2014 BQ_{19}	—	August 26, 2012	Haleakala	Pan-STARRS 1	·	1.5 km	MPC · JPL
765831	2014 BZ_{19}	—	December 30, 2013	Mount Lemmon	Mount Lemmon Survey	·	2.6 km	MPC · JPL
765832	2014 BA_{20}	—	January 22, 2006	Mount Lemmon	Mount Lemmon Survey	T_{j} (2.99) · 3:2 · (6124)	4.2 km	MPC · JPL
765833	2014 BZ_{25}	—	October 7, 2012	Haleakala	Pan-STARRS 1	·	1.5 km	MPC · JPL
765834	2014 BR_{26}	—	November 7, 2007	Kitt Peak	Spacewatch	(3460)	1.9 km	MPC · JPL
765835	2014 BF_{29}	—	January 10, 2014	Kitt Peak	Spacewatch	TIR	2.2 km	MPC · JPL
765836	2014 BM_{30}	—	January 10, 2014	Mount Lemmon	Mount Lemmon Survey	·	900 m	MPC · JPL
765837	2014 BU_{30}	—	January 23, 2014	Mount Lemmon	Mount Lemmon Survey	·	1.3 km	MPC · JPL
765838	2014 BC_{35}	—	December 28, 2013	Catalina	CSS	·	2.0 km	MPC · JPL
765839	2014 BH_{35}	—	January 21, 2014	Kitt Peak	Spacewatch	·	1.2 km	MPC · JPL
765840	2014 BC_{38}	—	January 23, 2014	Mount Lemmon	Mount Lemmon Survey	EUP	2.2 km	MPC · JPL
765841	2014 BQ_{38}	—	January 23, 2014	Mount Lemmon	Mount Lemmon Survey	·	1.2 km	MPC · JPL
765842	2014 BR_{38}	—	January 23, 2014	Mount Lemmon	Mount Lemmon Survey	·	2.4 km	MPC · JPL
765843	2014 BT_{41}	—	January 24, 2014	Haleakala	Pan-STARRS 1	·	1.1 km	MPC · JPL
765844	2014 BA_{42}	—	October 1, 2005	Mount Lemmon	Mount Lemmon Survey	·	780 m	MPC · JPL
765845	2014 BK_{42}	—	January 24, 2014	Haleakala	Pan-STARRS 1	·	1.3 km	MPC · JPL
765846	2014 BG_{47}	—	January 3, 2014	Catalina	CSS	·	2.3 km	MPC · JPL
765847	2014 BD_{51}	—	December 30, 2013	Kitt Peak	Spacewatch	·	2.2 km	MPC · JPL
765848	2014 BG_{51}	—	January 1, 2014	Haleakala	Pan-STARRS 1	BAP	590 m	MPC · JPL
765849	2014 BT_{51}	—	April 26, 2011	Mount Lemmon	Mount Lemmon Survey	·	880 m	MPC · JPL
765850	2014 BC_{55}	—	January 1, 2014	Kitt Peak	Spacewatch	·	860 m	MPC · JPL
765851	2014 BX_{55}	—	January 3, 2014	Mount Lemmon	Mount Lemmon Survey	·	2.5 km	MPC · JPL
765852	2014 BN_{56}	—	January 28, 2014	Mount Lemmon	Mount Lemmon Survey	VER	2.0 km	MPC · JPL
765853	2014 BE_{58}	—	January 10, 2014	Mount Lemmon	Mount Lemmon Survey	·	2.2 km	MPC · JPL
765854	2014 BY_{58}	—	January 10, 2014	Mount Lemmon	Mount Lemmon Survey	·	1.9 km	MPC · JPL
765855	2014 BQ_{60}	—	November 11, 2009	Kitt Peak	Spacewatch	·	720 m	MPC · JPL
765856	2014 BQ_{61}	—	January 21, 2014	Kitt Peak	Spacewatch	·	2.0 km	MPC · JPL
765857	2014 BF_{65}	—	September 22, 2003	Kitt Peak	Spacewatch	·	1.1 km	MPC · JPL
765858	2014 BH_{65}	—	January 28, 2014	Kitt Peak	Spacewatch	·	1.4 km	MPC · JPL
765859	2014 BO_{66}	—	January 23, 2014	Mount Lemmon	Mount Lemmon Survey	EOS	1.6 km	MPC · JPL
765860	2014 BO_{67}	—	August 27, 2006	Kitt Peak	Spacewatch	EUP	2.7 km	MPC · JPL
765861	2014 BS_{67}	—	January 24, 2014	Haleakala	Pan-STARRS 1	BRG	1.2 km	MPC · JPL
765862	2014 BL_{68}	—	January 26, 2014	Haleakala	Pan-STARRS 1	·	2.4 km	MPC · JPL
765863	2014 BV_{68}	—	January 28, 2014	Kitt Peak	Spacewatch	·	750 m	MPC · JPL
765864	2014 BT_{69}	—	January 31, 2014	Haleakala	Pan-STARRS 1	MAR	860 m	MPC · JPL
765865	2014 BW_{69}	—	March 15, 2007	Mount Lemmon	Mount Lemmon Survey	NYS	960 m	MPC · JPL
765866	2014 BQ_{70}	—	January 21, 2014	Mount Lemmon	Mount Lemmon Survey	·	2.5 km	MPC · JPL
765867	2014 BA_{71}	—	January 21, 2014	Haleakala	Pan-STARRS 1	H	410 m	MPC · JPL
765868	2014 BJ_{72}	—	April 18, 2015	Mount Lemmon	Mount Lemmon Survey	(1298)	2.5 km	MPC · JPL
765869	2014 BK_{72}	—	January 24, 2014	Haleakala	Pan-STARRS 1	·	2.5 km	MPC · JPL
765870	2014 BX_{72}	—	January 29, 2014	Mount Lemmon	Mount Lemmon Survey	·	2.6 km	MPC · JPL
765871	2014 BL_{74}	—	January 25, 2014	Haleakala	Pan-STARRS 1	·	1.7 km	MPC · JPL
765872	2014 BJ_{76}	—	January 24, 2014	Haleakala	Pan-STARRS 1	·	840 m	MPC · JPL
765873	2014 BH_{77}	—	January 31, 2014	Haleakala	Pan-STARRS 1	TIR	2.3 km	MPC · JPL
765874	2014 BR_{77}	—	October 18, 2012	Haleakala	Pan-STARRS 1	·	1.6 km	MPC · JPL
765875	2014 BT_{77}	—	January 31, 2014	Haleakala	Pan-STARRS 1	·	3.2 km	MPC · JPL
765876	2014 BE_{78}	—	January 24, 2014	Haleakala	Pan-STARRS 1	·	2.0 km	MPC · JPL
765877	2014 BW_{78}	—	January 28, 2014	Mount Lemmon	Mount Lemmon Survey	·	2.3 km	MPC · JPL
765878	2014 BE_{85}	—	January 21, 2014	Mount Lemmon	Mount Lemmon Survey	·	2.0 km	MPC · JPL
765879	2014 BK_{85}	—	January 28, 2014	Catalina	CSS	TIR	2.3 km	MPC · JPL
765880	2014 BW_{88}	—	January 28, 2014	Mount Lemmon	Mount Lemmon Survey	·	2.1 km	MPC · JPL
765881	2014 BV_{89}	—	January 31, 2014	Haleakala	Pan-STARRS 1	·	2.6 km	MPC · JPL
765882	2014 BB_{90}	—	January 28, 2014	Mount Lemmon	Mount Lemmon Survey	·	2.3 km	MPC · JPL
765883	2014 BY_{93}	—	January 28, 2014	Mount Lemmon	Mount Lemmon Survey	·	2.2 km	MPC · JPL
765884	2014 CC_{2}	—	November 3, 2005	Mount Lemmon	Mount Lemmon Survey	·	950 m	MPC · JPL
765885	2014 CY_{2}	—	February 10, 2008	Lulin	LUSS	T_{j} (2.9)	2.2 km	MPC · JPL
765886	2014 CT_{4}	—	December 30, 2013	Mount Lemmon	Mount Lemmon Survey	·	1.8 km	MPC · JPL
765887	2014 CJ_{6}	—	November 28, 2013	Mount Lemmon	Mount Lemmon Survey	·	1.8 km	MPC · JPL
765888	2014 CR_{6}	—	January 3, 2014	Kitt Peak	Spacewatch	·	2.2 km	MPC · JPL
765889	2014 CH_{8}	—	October 24, 2008	Kitt Peak	Spacewatch	(5)	1 km	MPC · JPL
765890	2014 CU_{14}	—	January 15, 2008	Catalina	CSS	T_{j} (2.94)	3.4 km	MPC · JPL
765891	2014 CG_{16}	—	November 1, 2005	Mount Lemmon	Mount Lemmon Survey	·	780 m	MPC · JPL
765892	2014 CK_{21}	—	February 9, 2014	Catalina	CSS	·	2.9 km	MPC · JPL
765893	2014 CW_{23}	—	February 9, 2014	Haleakala	Pan-STARRS 1	L4	7.4 km	MPC · JPL
765894	2014 CQ_{24}	—	January 11, 2010	Kitt Peak	Spacewatch	·	1.1 km	MPC · JPL
765895	2014 CK_{25}	—	February 6, 2014	Kitt Peak	Spacewatch	NYS	830 m	MPC · JPL
765896	2014 CR_{26}	—	February 10, 2014	Haleakala	Pan-STARRS 1	·	2.0 km	MPC · JPL
765897	2014 CA_{27}	—	February 10, 2014	Haleakala	Pan-STARRS 1	·	1.5 km	MPC · JPL
765898	2014 CE_{29}	—	February 10, 2014	Mount Lemmon	Mount Lemmon Survey	EUN	860 m	MPC · JPL
765899	2014 CF_{29}	—	April 9, 2003	Kitt Peak	Spacewatch	·	2.4 km	MPC · JPL
765900	2014 CF_{31}	—	February 8, 2014	Mount Lemmon	Mount Lemmon Survey	·	2.4 km	MPC · JPL

== 765901–766000 ==
back to top

Designation			Discovery			Properties		Ref
Permanent	Provisional	Named after	Date	Site	Discoverer(s)	Category	Diam.	Ref
765901	2014 CJ_{31}	—	February 10, 2014	Haleakala	Pan-STARRS 1	·	2.0 km	MPC · JPL
765902	2014 CW_{32}	—	February 2, 2014	Mount Lemmon	Mount Lemmon Survey	·	2.0 km	MPC · JPL
765903	2014 CB_{33}	—	February 11, 2014	Mount Lemmon	Mount Lemmon Survey	L4	6.5 km	MPC · JPL
765904	2014 CG_{33}	—	February 8, 2014	Mount Lemmon	Mount Lemmon Survey	·	2.6 km	MPC · JPL
765905	2014 CX_{33}	—	February 10, 2014	Mount Lemmon	Mount Lemmon Survey	·	2.3 km	MPC · JPL
765906	2014 CF_{34}	—	February 9, 2014	Kitt Peak	Spacewatch	·	2.7 km	MPC · JPL
765907	2014 CL_{34}	—	February 10, 2014	Haleakala	Pan-STARRS 1	T_{j} (2.99)	2.3 km	MPC · JPL
765908	2014 CR_{34}	—	February 10, 2014	Mount Lemmon	Mount Lemmon Survey	·	2.5 km	MPC · JPL
765909	2014 CE_{35}	—	February 10, 2014	Haleakala	Pan-STARRS 1	L4	8.2 km	MPC · JPL
765910	2014 CL_{35}	—	February 10, 2014	Haleakala	Pan-STARRS 1	L4 · ERY	6.5 km	MPC · JPL
765911	2014 CE_{36}	—	February 8, 2014	Mount Lemmon	Mount Lemmon Survey	LUT	3.2 km	MPC · JPL
765912	2014 DZ	—	January 26, 1998	Kitt Peak	Spacewatch	T_{j} (2.95) · 3:2	3.9 km	MPC · JPL
765913	2014 DN_{1}	—	January 29, 2014	Kitt Peak	Spacewatch	ADE	1.5 km	MPC · JPL
765914	2014 DC_{6}	—	January 31, 2014	Haleakala	Pan-STARRS 1	·	990 m	MPC · JPL
765915	2014 DZ_{7}	—	January 7, 2014	Kitt Peak	Spacewatch	·	2.7 km	MPC · JPL
765916	2014 DV_{8}	—	February 5, 2014	Nogales	M. Schwartz, P. R. Holvorcem	H	570 m	MPC · JPL
765917	2014 DX_{13}	—	February 20, 2014	Haleakala	Pan-STARRS 1	TIR	2.7 km	MPC · JPL
765918	2014 DO_{15}	—	February 21, 2014	Kitt Peak	Spacewatch	·	970 m	MPC · JPL
765919	2014 DA_{17}	—	February 22, 2014	Mount Lemmon	Mount Lemmon Survey	·	2.5 km	MPC · JPL
765920	2014 DO_{20}	—	February 22, 2014	Haleakala	Pan-STARRS 1	PHO	560 m	MPC · JPL
765921	2014 DL_{24}	—	February 10, 2014	Haleakala	Pan-STARRS 1	·	2.2 km	MPC · JPL
765922	2014 DO_{27}	—	October 18, 2012	Haleakala	Pan-STARRS 1	·	2.0 km	MPC · JPL
765923	2014 DE_{32}	—	December 1, 2005	Kitt Peak	Spacewatch	·	850 m	MPC · JPL
765924	2014 DL_{33}	—	March 24, 2006	Mount Lemmon	Mount Lemmon Survey	·	950 m	MPC · JPL
765925	2014 DQ_{33}	—	February 21, 2014	Kitt Peak	Spacewatch	·	1.6 km	MPC · JPL
765926	2014 DW_{38}	—	December 26, 2013	Kitt Peak	Spacewatch	EUN	1.1 km	MPC · JPL
765927	2014 DN_{39}	—	February 17, 2007	Kitt Peak	Spacewatch	·	830 m	MPC · JPL
765928	2014 DT_{39}	—	January 2, 2014	Kitt Peak	Spacewatch	·	890 m	MPC · JPL
765929	2014 DX_{39}	—	December 30, 2013	Mount Lemmon	Mount Lemmon Survey	·	2.7 km	MPC · JPL
765930	2014 DV_{41}	—	October 20, 2008	Mount Lemmon	Mount Lemmon Survey	·	1.1 km	MPC · JPL
765931	2014 DR_{44}	—	February 26, 2014	Mount Lemmon	Mount Lemmon Survey	·	2.4 km	MPC · JPL
765932	2014 DC_{47}	—	October 1, 2005	Mount Lemmon	Mount Lemmon Survey	·	2.6 km	MPC · JPL
765933	2014 DF_{55}	—	February 26, 2014	Haleakala	Pan-STARRS 1	·	710 m	MPC · JPL
765934	2014 DQ_{55}	—	January 23, 2006	Kitt Peak	Spacewatch	·	900 m	MPC · JPL
765935	2014 DN_{57}	—	May 29, 2011	Kitt Peak	Spacewatch	·	640 m	MPC · JPL
765936	2014 DZ_{59}	—	December 18, 2009	Kitt Peak	Spacewatch	·	910 m	MPC · JPL
765937	2014 DO_{65}	—	February 26, 2014	Haleakala	Pan-STARRS 1	·	1.4 km	MPC · JPL
765938	2014 DR_{67}	—	February 26, 2014	Haleakala	Pan-STARRS 1	·	1.3 km	MPC · JPL
765939	2014 DB_{69}	—	September 24, 2011	Haleakala	Pan-STARRS 1	EOS	1.4 km	MPC · JPL
765940	2014 DR_{70}	—	September 26, 2011	Haleakala	Pan-STARRS 1	·	1.5 km	MPC · JPL
765941	2014 DF_{71}	—	May 1, 2009	Kitt Peak	Spacewatch	HYG	2.2 km	MPC · JPL
765942	2014 DX_{71}	—	September 21, 2012	Mount Lemmon	Mount Lemmon Survey	(5)	930 m	MPC · JPL
765943	2014 DA_{74}	—	February 26, 2014	Haleakala	Pan-STARRS 1	·	1.2 km	MPC · JPL
765944	2014 DS_{76}	—	April 25, 2007	Kitt Peak	Spacewatch	V	470 m	MPC · JPL
765945	2014 DM_{81}	—	February 22, 2014	Kitt Peak	Spacewatch	L4	6.8 km	MPC · JPL
765946	2014 DP_{83}	—	February 25, 2014	Kitt Peak	Spacewatch	L4	6.5 km	MPC · JPL
765947	2014 DM_{86}	—	February 26, 2014	Mount Lemmon	Mount Lemmon Survey	·	1.3 km	MPC · JPL
765948	2014 DR_{88}	—	January 28, 2014	Kitt Peak	Spacewatch	·	2.1 km	MPC · JPL
765949	2014 DA_{89}	—	April 28, 2009	Kitt Peak	Spacewatch	·	2.0 km	MPC · JPL
765950	2014 DK_{94}	—	February 10, 2014	Haleakala	Pan-STARRS 1	H	370 m	MPC · JPL
765951	2014 DN_{94}	—	February 26, 2014	Mount Lemmon	Mount Lemmon Survey	·	950 m	MPC · JPL
765952	2014 DX_{95}	—	December 29, 2008	Kitt Peak	Spacewatch	·	1.2 km	MPC · JPL
765953	2014 DB_{99}	—	January 25, 2014	Haleakala	Pan-STARRS 1	EOS	1.3 km	MPC · JPL
765954	2014 DY_{99}	—	October 20, 2008	Kitt Peak	Spacewatch	·	1.3 km	MPC · JPL
765955	2014 DO_{101}	—	February 27, 2014	Mount Lemmon	Mount Lemmon Survey	·	990 m	MPC · JPL
765956	2014 DW_{101}	—	February 26, 2007	Mount Lemmon	Mount Lemmon Survey	MAS	640 m	MPC · JPL
765957	2014 DP_{102}	—	February 6, 2014	Mount Lemmon	Mount Lemmon Survey	·	2.3 km	MPC · JPL
765958	2014 DO_{104}	—	January 8, 2010	Kitt Peak	Spacewatch	MAS	510 m	MPC · JPL
765959	2014 DE_{105}	—	February 27, 2014	Mount Lemmon	Mount Lemmon Survey	·	1.3 km	MPC · JPL
765960	2014 DK_{105}	—	February 27, 2014	Mount Lemmon	Mount Lemmon Survey	·	1.8 km	MPC · JPL
765961	2014 DQ_{111}	—	February 26, 2014	Haleakala	Pan-STARRS 1	·	1.2 km	MPC · JPL
765962	2014 DW_{120}	—	December 30, 2007	Kitt Peak	Spacewatch	·	2.2 km	MPC · JPL
765963	2014 DG_{132}	—	June 10, 2011	Mount Lemmon	Mount Lemmon Survey	·	620 m	MPC · JPL
765964	2014 DB_{133}	—	February 28, 2014	Haleakala	Pan-STARRS 1	·	930 m	MPC · JPL
765965	2014 DB_{134}	—	October 20, 2012	Haleakala	Pan-STARRS 1	·	880 m	MPC · JPL
765966	2014 DD_{135}	—	April 30, 2009	Kitt Peak	Spacewatch	·	2.5 km	MPC · JPL
765967	2014 DC_{139}	—	February 9, 2008	Mount Lemmon	Mount Lemmon Survey	·	2.2 km	MPC · JPL
765968	2014 DP_{141}	—	November 18, 2009	Kitt Peak	Spacewatch	·	1.2 km	MPC · JPL
765969	2014 DV_{141}	—	February 20, 2014	Mount Lemmon	Mount Lemmon Survey	·	2.6 km	MPC · JPL
765970	2014 DX_{141}	—	January 1, 2014	XuYi	PMO NEO Survey Program	·	1.3 km	MPC · JPL
765971	2014 DV_{143}	—	February 27, 2014	Haleakala	Pan-STARRS 1	L4	5.7 km	MPC · JPL
765972	2014 DB_{144}	—	January 23, 2015	Haleakala	Pan-STARRS 1	L4	6.6 km	MPC · JPL
765973	2014 DU_{144}	—	February 21, 2014	Haleakala	Pan-STARRS 1	·	3.1 km	MPC · JPL
765974	2014 DM_{145}	—	February 28, 2014	Haleakala	Pan-STARRS 1	THB	2.4 km	MPC · JPL
765975	2014 DY_{145}	—	September 18, 2011	Mount Lemmon	Mount Lemmon Survey	GEF	860 m	MPC · JPL
765976	2014 DO_{146}	—	February 26, 2014	Haleakala	Pan-STARRS 1	·	1.1 km	MPC · JPL
765977	2014 DN_{147}	—	February 28, 2014	Haleakala	Pan-STARRS 1	·	1.5 km	MPC · JPL
765978	2014 DX_{149}	—	January 1, 2014	Mount Lemmon	Mount Lemmon Survey	V	530 m	MPC · JPL
765979	2014 DX_{151}	—	February 26, 2014	Haleakala	Pan-STARRS 1	·	970 m	MPC · JPL
765980	2014 DN_{152}	—	February 27, 2014	Haleakala	Pan-STARRS 1	·	2.2 km	MPC · JPL
765981	2014 DK_{154}	—	February 28, 2014	Haleakala	Pan-STARRS 1	·	1.1 km	MPC · JPL
765982	2014 DG_{155}	—	June 18, 2015	Haleakala	Pan-STARRS 1	·	900 m	MPC · JPL
765983	2014 DP_{156}	—	February 24, 2014	Haleakala	Pan-STARRS 1	·	2.6 km	MPC · JPL
765984	2014 DT_{156}	—	February 26, 2014	Haleakala	Pan-STARRS 1	VER	2.0 km	MPC · JPL
765985	2014 DU_{156}	—	August 26, 2016	Haleakala	Pan-STARRS 1	·	2.7 km	MPC · JPL
765986	2014 DC_{157}	—	November 11, 2009	Mount Lemmon	Mount Lemmon Survey	·	970 m	MPC · JPL
765987	2014 DF_{157}	—	February 28, 2014	Haleakala	Pan-STARRS 1	·	1.3 km	MPC · JPL
765988	2014 DR_{157}	—	February 26, 2014	Haleakala	Pan-STARRS 1	·	1.6 km	MPC · JPL
765989	2014 DS_{157}	—	February 28, 2014	Mount Lemmon	Mount Lemmon Survey	·	1 km	MPC · JPL
765990	2014 DM_{160}	—	February 26, 2014	Haleakala	Pan-STARRS 1	·	2.4 km	MPC · JPL
765991	2014 DV_{162}	—	February 24, 2014	Haleakala	Pan-STARRS 1	·	2.7 km	MPC · JPL
765992	2014 DW_{162}	—	June 25, 2015	Haleakala	Pan-STARRS 1	EUN	960 m	MPC · JPL
765993	2014 DB_{163}	—	February 26, 2014	Haleakala	Pan-STARRS 1	·	2.4 km	MPC · JPL
765994	2014 DQ_{163}	—	February 26, 2014	Haleakala	Pan-STARRS 1	·	2.3 km	MPC · JPL
765995	2014 DP_{166}	—	February 27, 2014	Haleakala	Pan-STARRS 1	·	640 m	MPC · JPL
765996	2014 DU_{166}	—	April 16, 2015	Haleakala	Pan-STARRS 1	L4	6.3 km	MPC · JPL
765997	2014 DY_{169}	—	February 20, 2014	Mount Lemmon	Mount Lemmon Survey	·	2.8 km	MPC · JPL
765998	2014 DV_{170}	—	February 26, 2014	Haleakala	Pan-STARRS 1	·	2.3 km	MPC · JPL
765999	2014 DP_{171}	—	February 20, 2014	Haleakala	Pan-STARRS 1	T_{j} (2.98) · EUP	2.4 km	MPC · JPL
766000	2014 DZ_{171}	—	February 25, 2014	Haleakala	Pan-STARRS 1	·	1.2 km	MPC · JPL

back to top

== Meaning of names ==
As minor planet discoveries are confirmed, they are given a permanent number by the IAU's Minor Planet Center (MPC), and the discoverers can then submit names for them, following the IAU's naming conventions. The list below concerns those minor planets in the specified number-range that have received names, and explains the meanings of those names.

Official naming citations of newly named small Solar System bodies are approved and published in a bulletin by IAU's Working Group for Small Bodies Nomenclature (WGSBN). Before May 2021, citations were published in MPC's Minor Planet Circulars for many decades. Recent citations can also be found on the JPL Small-Body Database (SBDB). Until his death in 2016, German astronomer Lutz D. Schmadel compiled these citations into the Dictionary of Minor Planet Names (DMP) and regularly updated the collection.

Based on Paul Herget's The Names of the Minor Planets, Schmadel also researched the unclear origin of numerous asteroids, most of which had been named prior to World War II. This article incorporates text from this source, which is in the public domain: SBDB New namings may only be added to this list below after official publication as the preannouncement of names is condemned. The WGSBN publishes a comprehensive guideline for the naming rules of non-cometary small Solar System bodies.

Named minor planet	Provisional	This minor planet was named for...	Ref · Catalog
765015 Marčiulionis	2013 RO_{26}	Raimondas Šarūnas Marčiulionis, Lithuanian former professional basketball player.	IAU · 765015
