= Olympiacos B.C. in international competitions =

Basketball team

Olympiacos B.C. in international competitions is the history and statistics of Olympiacos B.C. in FIBA Europe and Euroleague Basketball Company competitions.

== 1960s ==
=== 1960–61 FIBA European Champions Cup, 1st–tier ===
The 1960–61 FIBA European Champions Cup was the 4th installment of the European top-tier level professional basketball club competition FIBA European Champions Cup (now called EuroLeague), running from November 29, 1960 to July 26, 1961. The trophy was won by CSKA Moscow, who defeated the title holder Rīgas ASK by a result of 141–128 in a two-legged final on a home and away basis. Overall, Olympiacos achieved in the present competition a record of 0 wins against 2 defeats, in only one round. More detailed:

==== First round ====
- Tie played on November 23*, 1960 and on December 11, 1960.

Team 1	Agg.	Team 2	1st leg	2nd leg
Galatasaray (Turkey)	137–96	(Greece) Olympiacos	72-41	65-55

^{*}The game conducted six days before the official opening of the competition.

== 1970s ==
=== 1972–73 FIBA European Cup Winners' Cup, 2nd–tier ===
The 1972–73 FIBA European Cup Winners' Cup was the 7th installment of FIBA's 2nd-tier level European-wide professional club basketball competition FIBA European Cup Winners' Cup (lately called FIBA Saporta Cup), running from October 18, 1972 to March 20, 1973. The trophy was won by Spartak Leningrad, who defeated Jugoplastika by a result of 77–62 at Alexandreio Melathron in Thessaloniki, Greece. Overall, Olympiacos achieved in the present competition a record of 1 win against 3 defeats, in three successive rounds. More detailed:

==== First round ====
- Bye

==== Second round ====
- Tie played on November 8, 1972 and on November 15, 1972.

Team 1	Agg.	Team 2	1st leg	2nd leg
Raak Punch (Netherlands)	165–175	(Greece) Olympiacos	88–68	77–107*

^{*}The score in the second leg at the end of regulation was 89–69 for Olympiacos, so it was necessary to play an extra-time to decide the winner of this match.

==== Top 12 ====
- Tie played on December 6, 1972 and on December 13, 1972.

Team 1	Agg.	Team 2	1st leg	2nd leg
Olympiacos (Greece)	161–170	(Czechoslovakia) Spartak ZJŠ Brno	87–94	74–76

=== 1973–74 FIBA European Cup Winners' Cup, 2nd–tier ===
The 1973–74 FIBA European Cup Winners' Cup was the 8th installment of FIBA's 2nd-tier level European-wide professional club basketball competition FIBA European Cup Winners' Cup (lately called FIBA Saporta Cup), running from October 17, 1973 to April 2, 1974. The trophy was won by Crvena zvezda, who defeated Spartak ZJŠ Brno by a result of 86–75 at Palasport Primo Carnera in Udine, Italy. Overall, Olympiacos achieved in the present competition a record of 2 wins against 1 defeat, plus 1 draw, in three successive rounds. More detailed:

==== First round ====
- Bye

==== Second round ====
- Tie played on November 7, 1973 and on November 14, 1973.

Team 1	Agg.	Team 2	1st leg	2nd leg
Soproni MAFC (Hungary)	123–137	(Greece) Olympiacos	67–67	56–70

==== Top 12 ====
- Tie played on November 28, 1973 and on December 5, 1973.

Team 1	Agg.	Team 2	1st leg	2nd leg
Olympiacos (Greece)	136–138	(Bulgaria) CSKA Septemvriisko zname	67–59	69–79

=== 1975–76 FIBA European Cup Winners' Cup, 2nd–tier ===
The 1973–74 FIBA European Cup Winners' Cup was the 10th installment of FIBA's 2nd-tier level European-wide professional club basketball competition FIBA European Cup Winners' Cup (lately called FIBA Saporta Cup), running from October 29, 1975 to March 17, 1976. The trophy was won by Cinzano Milano, who defeated ASPO Tours by a result of 88–83 at Palasport Parco Ruffini in Turin, Italy. Overall, Olympiacos achieved in the present competition a record of 5 wins against 5 defeats, in three successive rounds. More detailed:

==== First round ====
- Tie played on October 20, 1975 and on November 5, 1975.

Team 1	Agg.	Team 2	1st leg	2nd leg
Olympiacos (Greece)	162–145	(Israel) Hapoel Gvat/Yagur	89–63	73–82

==== Top 14 ====
- Tie played on November 19, 1975 and on November 26, 1975.

Team 1	Agg.	Team 2	1st leg	2nd leg
Olympiacos (Greece)	142–125	(Austria) Soma Wien	77–49	65–76

==== Quarterfinals ====
- Day 1 (January 7, 1976) / Day 2 (January 14, 1976)

Team 1	Agg.	Team 2	1st leg	2nd leg
Olympiacos (Greece)	168–177	(Bulgaria) CSKA Septemvriisko zname	91–78	77–99

- Day 3 (January 21, 1976) / Day 4 (January 28, 1976)

Team 1	Agg.	Team 2	1st leg	2nd leg
ASPO Tours (France)	171–154	(Greece) Olympiacos	102–77	69–77

- Day 5 (February 4, 1976) / Day 6 (February 11, 1976)

Team 1	Agg.	Team 2	1st leg	2nd leg
Rabotnički (Socialist Federal Republic of Yugoslavia)	161–170	(Greece) Olympiacos	90–79	71–91

- Group A standings:

Pos.	Team	Pld.	Pts.	W	L	PF	PA	PD	Tie-break
1.	(Socialist Federal Republic of Yugoslavia) Rabotnički	3	5	2	1	552	537	+15	1–0
2.	(France) ASPO Tours	3	5	2	1	546	523	+23	0–1
3.	(Bulgaria) CSKA Septemvriisko zname	3	4	1	2	534	555	-21	1–0
4.	(Greece) Olympiacos	3	4	1	2	492	509	-17	0–1

=== 1976–77 FIBA European Champions Cup, 1st–tier ===
The 1976–77 FIBA European Champions Cup was the 20th installment of the European top-tier level professional basketball club competition FIBA European Champions Cup (now called EuroLeague), running from October 14, 1976 to April 7, 1977. The trophy was won by Maccabi Tel Aviv, who defeated the title holder Mobilgirgi Varese by a result of 78–77, at Hala Pionir, in Belgrade, SFR Yugoslavia. Overall, Olympiacos achieved in the present competition a record of 2 wins against 4 defeats, in only one round. More detailed:

==== First round ====
- Day 1 (October 14, 1976)

Team 1	Score	Team 2
Olympiacos (Greece)	74–90	(Israel) Maccabi Tel Aviv

- Day 2 (October 21, 1976)

Team 1	Score	Team 2
Sinudyne Bologna (Italy)	87–64	(Greece) Olympiacos

- Day 3 (October 28, 1976)

Team 1	Score	Team 2
Olympiacos (Greece)	84–80	(Romania) Dinamo București

- Day 4 (November 4, 1976)

Team 1	Score	Team 2
Maccabi Tel Aviv (Israel)	101–75	(Greece) Olympiacos

- Day 5 (November 18, 1976)

Team 1	Score	Team 2
Olympiacos (Greece)	81–79	(Italy) Sinudyne Bologna

- Day 6 (November 25, 1976)

Team 1	Score	Team 2
Dinamo București (Romania)	94–71	(Greece) Olympiacos

- Group E standings:

Pos.	Team	Pld.	Pts.	W	L	PF	PA	PD	Tie-break
1.	(Israel) Maccabi Tel Aviv	6	11	5	1	542	470	+72	
2.	(Italy) Sinudyne Bologna	6	9	3	3	496	482	+14	
3.	(Romania) Dinamo București	6	8	2	4	505	509	-4	1–1 (+19)
4.	(Greece) Olympiacos	6	8	2	4	449	531	-82	1–1 (-19)

=== 1977–78 FIBA European Cup Winners' Cup, 2nd–tier ===
The 1977–78 FIBA European Cup Winners' Cup was the 12th installment of FIBA's 2nd-tier level European-wide professional club basketball competition FIBA European Cup Winners' Cup (lately called FIBA Saporta Cup), running from October 19, 1977 to March 29, 1978. The trophy was won by the title holder Gabetti Cantù, who defeated Sinudyne Bologna by a result of 84–82 at PalaLido in Milan, Italy. Overall, Olympiacos achieved in the present competition a record of 2 wins against 2 defeats, in two successive rounds. More detailed:

==== First round ====
- Tie played on October 19, 1977 and on October 26, 1977.

Team 1	Agg.	Team 2	1st leg	2nd leg
Hapoel Tel Aviv (Israel)	134–135	(Greece) Olympiacos	79–60	55–75

==== Top 15 ====
- Tie played on November 16, 1977 and on November 23, 1977.

Team 1	Agg.	Team 2	1st leg	2nd leg
Olympiacos (Greece)	139–150	(Italy) Sinudyne Bologna	78–72	61–78

=== 1978–79 FIBA European Champions Cup, 1st–tier ===
The 1978–79 FIBA European Champions Cup was the 22nd installment of the European top-tier level professional basketball club competition FIBA European Champions Cup (now called EuroLeague), running from November 2, 1978 to April 5, 1979. The trophy was won by Bosna, who defeated Emerson Varese by a result of 96–93 at Palais des Sports in Grenoble, France. Overall, Olympiacos achieved in the present competition a record of 5 wins against 11 defeats, in two successive rounds. More detailed:

==== First round ====
- Day 1 (November 2, 1978)

Team 1	Score	Team 2
Olympiacos (Greece)	106–57	(Syria) Jalaa

- Day 2 (November 9, 1978)

Team 1	Score	Team 2
Olympiacos (Greece)	79–62	(France) Moderne

- Day 3 (November 16, 1978)

Team 1	Score	Team 2
Wybrzeże Gdańsk (Poland)	91–85	(Greece) Olympiacos

- Day 4 (November 23, 1978)

Team 1	Score	Team 2
Jalaa (Syria)	76–94	(Greece) Olympiacos

- Day 5 (November 30, 1978)

Team 1	Score	Team 2
Moderne (France)	76–56	(Greece) Olympiacos

- Day 6 (December 7, 1978)

Team 1	Score	Team 2
Olympiacos (Greece)	102–79	(Poland) Wybrzeże Gdańsk

- Group D standings:

Pos.	Team	Pld.	Pts.	W	L	PF	PA	PD	Tie-break
1.	(Greece) Olympiacos	6	10	4	2	522	431	+91	2–2 (+14)
2.	(France) Moderne	6	10	4	2	515	438	+77	2–2 (+8)
3.	(Poland) Wybrzeże Gdańsk	6	10	4	2	540	545	-5	2–2 (-22)
4.	(Syria) Jalaa	6	6	0	6	431	584	-153	

==== Semifinals ====
- Day 1 (January 10, 1979)

Team 1	Score	Team 2
Olympiacos (Greece)	79–77	(Israel) Maccabi Tel Aviv

- Day 2 (January 17, 1979)

Team 1	Score	Team 2
Emerson Varese (Italy)	92–67	(Greece) Olympiacos

- Day 3 (January 25, 1979)

Team 1	Score	Team 2
Real Madrid (Spain)	113–72	(Greece) Olympiacos

- Day 4 (February 1, 1979)

Team 1	Score	Team 2
Olympiacos (Greece)	84–95	(Spain) Joventut Freixenet

- Day 5 (February 7, 1979)

Team 1	Score	Team 2
Bosna (Socialist Federal Republic of Yugoslavia)	72–69	(Greece) Olympiacos

- Day 6 (February 15, 1979)

Team 1	Score	Team 2
Maccabi Tel Aviv (Israel)	95–51	(Greece) Olympiacos

- Day 7 (February 28, 1979)

Team 1	Score	Team 2
Olympiacos (Greece)	68–72	(Italy) Emerson Varese

- Day 8 (March 7, 1979)

Team 1	Score	Team 2
Olympiacos (Greece)	97–101	(Spain) Real Madrid

- Day 9 (March 15, 1979)

Team 1	Score	Team 2
Joventut Freixenet (Spain)	91–77	(Greece) Olympiacos

- Day 10 (March 21, 1979)

Team 1	Score	Team 2
Olympiacos (Greece)	83–88	(Socialist Federal Republic of Yugoslavia) Bosna

- Semifinals group stage standings:

Pos.	Team	Pld.	Pts.	W	L	PF	PA	PD	Tie-break
1.	(Italy) Emerson Varese	10	17	7	3	819	763	+56	1–1 (0)
2.	(Socialist Federal Republic of Yugoslavia) Bosna	10	17	7	3	894	895	-1	1–1 (0)
3.	(Israel) Maccabi Tel Aviv	10	16	6	4	839	779	+60	1–1 (+9)
4.	(Spain) Real Madrid	10	16	6	4	976	910	+66	1–1 (-9)
5.	(Spain) Joventut Freixenet	10	13	3	7	860	892	-32	
6.	(Greece) Olympiacos	10	11	1	9	747	896	-149	

== 1980s ==
=== 1979–80 FIBA Korać Cup, 3rd–tier ===
The 1979–80 FIBA Korać Cup was the 9th installment of the European 3rd-tier level professional basketball club competition FIBA Korać Cup, running from October 31, 1979 to March 26, 1980. The trophy was won by Arrigoni Rieti, who defeated Cibona by a result of 76–71 at Country Hall du Sart Tilman in Liège, Belgium. Overall, Olympiacos achieved in the present competition a record of 3 wins against 3 defeats, in three successive rounds. More detailed:

==== First round ====
- Bye

==== Second round ====
- Bye

==== Top 16 ====
- Day 1 (January 9, 1980)

Team 1	Score	Team 2
Arrigoni Rieti (Italy)	83–72	(Greece) Olympiacos

- Day 2 (January 16, 1980)

Team 1	Score	Team 2
Olympiacos (Greece)	94–49	(Turkey) Tofaş

- Day 3 (January 23, 1980)

Team 1	Score	Team 2
Joventut Freixenet (Spain)	76–65	(Greece) Olympiacos

- Day 4 (February 6, 1980)

Team 1	Score	Team 2
Olympiacos (Greece)	93–97*	(Italy) Arrigoni Rieti

^{*}Overtime at the end of regulation (77–77).

- Day 5 (February 13, 1980)

Team 1	Score	Team 2
Tofaş (Turkey)	85–91	(Greece) Olympiacos

- Day 6 (February 20, 1980)

Team 1	Score	Team 2
Olympiacos (Greece)	86–69	(Spain) Joventut Freixenet

- Group B standings:

Pos.	Team	Pld.	Pts.	W	L	PF	PA	PD	Tie-break
1.	(Italy) Arrigoni Rieti	6	12	6	0	568	477	+91	
2.	(Greece) Olympiacos	6	9	3	3	501	459	+42	1–1 (+6)
3.	(Spain) Joventut Freixenet	6	9	3	3	487	462	+25	1–1 (-6)
4.	(Turkey) Tofaş	6	6	0	6	425	583	-158	

=== 1980–81 FIBA European Cup Winners' Cup, 2nd–tier ===
The 1980–81 FIBA European Cup Winners' Cup was the 15th installment of FIBA's 2nd-tier level European-wide professional club basketball competition FIBA European Cup Winners' Cup (lately called FIBA Saporta Cup), running from October 7, 1980 to March 18, 1981. The trophy was won by Squibb Cantù, who defeated FC Barcelona by a result of 86–82 at PalaEUR in Rome, Italy. Overall, Olympiacos achieved in the present competition a record of 0 wins against 2 defeats, in only one round. More detailed:

==== First round ====
- Tie played on October 7, 1980 and on October 14, 1980.

Team 1	Agg.	Team 2	1st leg	2nd leg
Olympiacos (Greece)	125–138	(Belgium) Verviers-Pepinster	58–67	67–71

=== 1981–82 FIBA Korać Cup, 3rd–tier ===
The 1981–82 FIBA Korać Cup was the 11th installment of the European 3rd-tier level professional basketball club competition FIBA Korać Cup, running from October 7, 1981 to March 18, 1982. The trophy was won by Limoges CSP, who defeated Šibenka by a result of 90–84 at Palasport San Lazzaro in Padua, Italy. Overall, Olympiacos achieved in present competition a record of 1 win against 1 defeat, in one round. More detailed:

==== First round ====
- Tie played on October 7, 1981 and on October 14, 1981.

Team 1	Agg.	Team 2	1st leg	2nd leg
Olympiacos (Greece)	139–156	(Belgium) Maes Pils	79–60	60–96

=== 1982–83 FIBA Korać Cup, 3rd–tier ===
The 1982–83 FIBA Korać Cup was the 12th installment of the European 3rd-tier level professional basketball club competition FIBA Korać Cup, running from October 6, 1982 to March 8, 1983. The trophy was won by the title holder Limoges CSP, who defeated -for second consecutive time- Šibenka by a result of 94–86 at Deutschlandhalle in West Berlin, West Germany. Overall, Olympiacos achieved in present competition a record of 1 win against 1 defeat, in one round. More detailed:

==== First round ====
- Tie played on October 6, 1982 and on October 13, 1982.

Team 1	Agg.	Team 2	1st leg	2nd leg
Olympiacos (Greece)	132–162	(Netherlands) Elmex Leiden	71–70	61-92

=== 1983–84 FIBA Korać Cup, 3rd–tier ===
The 1983–84 FIBA Korać Cup was the 13th installment of the European 3rd-tier level professional basketball club competition FIBA Korać Cup, running from September 28, 1983 to March 15, 1984. The trophy was won by Orthez, who defeated Crvena zvezda by a result of 97–73 at Palais des sports Pierre de Coubertin in Paris, France. Overall, Olympiacos achieved in present competition a record of 0 wins against 2 defeats, in two successive rounds. More detailed:

==== First round ====
- Bye

==== Second round ====
- Tie played on October 26, 1983 and on November 2, 1983.

Team 1	Agg.	Team 2	1st leg	2nd leg
Olympiacos (Greece)	0–4*	(Spain) CAI Zaragoza	0–2	0–2

^{*}Olympiacos withdrew before the first leg and his rival received a forfeit (2-0) in both games.

=== 1986–87 FIBA Korać Cup, 3rd–tier ===
The 1986–87 FIBA Korać Cup was the 16th installment of the European 3rd-tier level professional basketball club competition FIBA Korać Cup, running from October 1, 1986 to March 25, 1987. The trophy was won by FC Barcelona, who defeated Limoges CSP by a result of 203–171 in a two-legged final on a home and away basis. Overall, Olympiacos achieved in present competition a record of 0 wins against 2 defeat, in two successive rounds. More detailed:

==== First round ====
- Bye

==== Second round ====
- Tie played on October 29, 1986 and on November 5, 1986.

Team 1	Agg.	Team 2	1st leg	2nd leg
Assubel Mariembourg (Belgium)	198–144	(Greece) Olympiacos	95–70	103-74

=== 1988–89 FIBA Korać Cup, 3rd–tier ===
The 1988–89 FIBA Korać Cup was the 18th installment of the European 3rd-tier level professional basketball club competition FIBA Korać Cup, running from October 12, 1988 to March 22, 1989. The trophy was won by Partizan, who defeated Wiwa Vismara Cantù by a result of 177–171 in a two-legged final on a home and away basis. Overall, Olympiacos achieved in present competition a record of 4 wins against 6 defeats, in three successive rounds. More detailed:

==== First round ====
- Tie played on October 12, 1988 and on October 19, 1988.

Team 1	Agg.	Team 2	1st leg	2nd leg
Olympiacos (Greece)	189–131	(Poland) Górnik Wałbrzych	91–76	98–55

==== Second round ====
- Tie played on November 2, 1988 and November 9, 1988.

Team 1	Agg.	Team 2	1st leg	2nd leg
Dinamo Tbilisi (Soviet Union)	188–189	(Greece) Olympiacos	75–96	113–93*

^{*}The score in the second leg at the end of the regulation was 83–104 for Dinamo Tbilisi, so it was necessary to play an extra-time to decide the winner of this match.

==== Top 16 ====
- Day 1 (December 7, 1988)

Team 1	Score	Team 2
Hapoel Tel Aviv (Israel)	101–86	(Greece) Olympiacos

- Day 2 (December 14, 1988)

Team 1	Score	Team 2
Olympiacos (Greece)	89–86	(Spain) Ram Joventut

- Day 3 (January 11, 1989)

Team 1	Score	Team 2
Zadar (Socialist Federal Republic of Yugoslavia)	116–97	(Greece) Olympiacos

- Day 4 (January 18, 1989)

Team 1	Score	Team 2
Olympiacos (Greece)	87–99	(Israel) Hapoel Tel Aviv

- Day 5 (January 25, 1989)

Team 1	Score	Team 2
Ram Joventut (Spain)	101–73	(Greece) Olympiacos

- Day 6 (February 1, 1989)

Team 1	Score	Team 2
Olympiacos (Greece)	66–77	(Socialist Federal Republic of Yugoslavia) Zadar

- Group B standings:

Pos.	Team	Pld.	Pts.	W	L	PF	PA	PD
1.	(Socialist Federal Republic of Yugoslavia) Zadar	6	11	5	1	544	493	+51
2.	(Spain) Ram Joventut	6	10	4	2	546	489	+57
3.	(Israel) Hapoel Tel Aviv	6	8	2	4	512	538	-26
4.	(Greece) Olympiacos	6	7	1	5	498	580	-82

== 1990s ==
=== 1992–93 FIBA European League, 1st–tier ===
The 1992–93 FIBA European League was the 36th installment of the European top-tier level professional club competition for basketball clubs (now called EuroLeague), running from September 10, 1992 to April 15, 1993. The trophy was won by Limoges CSP, who defeated Benetton Treviso by a result of 59–55 at Peace and Friendship Stadium in Piraeus, Greece. Overall, Olympiacos achieved in present competition a record of 11 wins against 8 defeats, in four successive rounds. More detailed:

==== First round ====
- Bye

==== Second round ====
- Tie played on October 1, 1992 and on October 8, 1992.

Team 1	Agg.	Team 2	1st leg	2nd leg
Smelt Olimpija (Slovenia)	166–176	(Greece) Olympiacos	85–88	81–88

==== Top 16 ====
- Day 1 (October 29, 1992)

Team 1	Score	Team 2
Olympiacos (Greece)	73–66	(Spain) Estudiantes Argentaria

- Day 2 (November 5, 1992)

Team 1	Score	Team 2
Bayer 04 Leverkusen (Germany)	66–63*	(Greece) Olympiacos

^{*}Overtime at the end of regulation (54–54).

- Day 3 (November 25, 1992)

Team 1	Score	Team 2
Real Madrid Teka (Spain)	92–74	(Greece) Olympiacos

- Day 4 (December 3, 1992)

Team 1	Score	Team 2
Olympiacos (Greece)	93–96*	(France) Pau-Orthez

^{*}Overtime at the end of regulation (83–83).

- Day 5 (December 9, 1992)

Team 1	Score	Team 2
Zadar (Croatia)	86–77	(Greece) Olympiacos

- Day 6 (December 17, 1992)

Team 1	Score	Team 2
Olympiacos (Greece)	91–86	(Italy) Benetton Treviso

- Day 7 (January 7, 1993)

Team 1	Score	Team 2
Olympiacos (Greece)	79–60	(Belgium) Maes Pils

- Day 8 (January 13, 1993)

Team 1	Score	Team 2
Estudiantes Argentaria (Spain)	80–73	(Greece) Olympiacos

- Day 9 (January 21, 1993)

Team 1	Score	Team 2
Olympiacos (Greece)	79–63	(Germany) Bayer 04 Leverkusen

- Day 10 (January 28, 1993)

Team 1	Score	Team 2
Olympiacos (Greece)	63–62	(Spain) Real Madrid Teka

- Day 11 (February 3, 1993)

Team 1	Score	Team 2
Pau-Orthez (France)	64–65	(Greece) Olympiacos

- Day 12 (February 11, 1993)

Team 1	Score	Team 2
Olympiacos (Greece)	75–61	(Croatia) Zadar

- Day 13 (February 18, 1993)

Team 1	Score	Team 2
Benetton Treviso (Italy)	75–67	(Greece) Olympiacos

- Day 14 (February 24, 1993)

Team 1	Score	Team 2
Maes Pils (Belgium)	66–85	(Greece) Olympiacos

- Group B standings:

Pos.	Team	Pld.	Pts.	W	L	PF	PA	PD	Tie-break
1.	(Spain) Real Madrid Teka	14	26	12	2	1181	1031	+150	
2.	(Italy) Benetton Treviso	14	24	10	4	1127	1073	+54	
3.	(Greece) Olympiacos	14	22	8	6	1057	1023	+34	2–2 (+14)
4.	(France) Pau-Orthez	14	22	8	6	1113	1100	+13	2–2 (+4)
5.	(Germany) Bayer 04 Leverkusen	14	22	8	6	1099	1105	-6	2–2 (-18)
6.	(Croatia) Zadar	14	19	5	9	1096	1198	-102	
7.	(Spain) Estudiantes Argentaria	14	18	4	10	1132	1131	+1	
8.	(Belgium) Maes Pils	14	15	1	13	1092	1236	-144	

==== Quarterfinals ====
- Best-of-3 playoff: Game 1 at home on March 11, 1993 / Game 2 away on March 15, 1993 / Game 3 away on March 17, 1993.

Team 1	Agg.	Team 2	1st leg	2nd leg	3rd leg
Olympiacos (Greece)	1–2	(France) Limoges CSP	70–67	53–59	58–60

=== 1993–94 FIBA European League, 1st–tier ===
The 1993–94 FIBA European League was the 37th installment of the European top-tier level professional club competition for basketball clubs (now called EuroLeague), running from September 9, 1993 to April 21, 1994. The trophy was won by 7up Joventut, who defeated Olympiacos by a result of 59–57 at Yad Eliyahu Arena in Tel Aviv, Israel. Overall, Olympiacos achieved in present competition a record of 14 wins against 5 defeats, in six successive rounds. More detailed:

==== First round ====
- Bye

==== Second round ====
- Bye

==== Top 16 ====
- Day 1 (October 28, 1993)

Team 1	Score	Team 2
Bayer 04 Leverkusen (Germany)	53–70	(Greece) Olympiacos

- Day 2 (November 4, 1993)

Team 1	Score	Team 2
Olympiacos (Greece)	96–51	(England) Guildford Kings

- Day 3 (November 24, 1993)

Team 1	Score	Team 2
Real Madrid Teka (Spain)	57–58	(Greece) Olympiacos

- Day 4 (December 2, 1993)

Team 1	Score	Team 2
Benetton Treviso (Italy)	73–79	(Greece) Olympiacos

- Day 5 (December 9, 1993)

Team 1	Score	Team 2
Olympiacos (Greece)	71–63	(Belgium) Maes Pils

- Day 6 (December 15, 1993)

Team 1	Score	Team 2
FC Barcelona Banca Catalana (Spain)	73–69	(Greece) Olympiacos

- Day 7 (January 6, 1994)

Team 1	Score	Team 2
Olympiacos (Greece)	59–67	(France) Limoges CSP

- Day 8 (January 13, 1994)

Team 1	Score	Team 2
Olympiacos (Greece)	92–70	(Germany) Bayer 04 Leverkusen

- Day 9 (January 19, 1994)

Team 1	Score	Team 2
Guildford Kings (England)	51–71	(Greece) Olympiacos

- Day 10 (January 26, 1994)

Team 1	Score	Team 2
Olympiacos (Greece)	75–73*	(Spain) Real Madrid Teka

^{*}Overtime at the end of regulation (66–66).

- Day 11 (February 2, 1994)

Team 1	Score	Team 2
Olympiacos (Greece)	80–65	(Italy) Benetton Treviso

- Day 12 (February 10, 1994)

Team 1	Score	Team 2
Maes Pils (Belgium)	70–86	(Greece) Olympiacos

- Day 13 (February 16, 1994)

Team 1	Score	Team 2
Olympiacos (Greece)	82–64	(Spain) FC Barcelona Banca Catalana

- Day 14 (February 23, 1994)

Team 1	Score	Team 2
Limoges CSP (France)	67–59	(Greece) Olympiacos

- Group A standings:

Pos.	Team	Pld.	Pts.	W	L	PF	PA	PD	Tie-break
1.	(Greece) Olympiacos	14	25	11	3	1047	897	+150	
2.	(Spain) Real Madrid Teka	14	23	9	5	1123	978	+145	1–1 (+29)
3.	(France) Limoges CSP	14	23	9	5	1013	979	+34	1–1 (-29)
4.	(Spain) FC Barcelona Banca Catalana	14	22	8	6	1132	1067	+65	1–1 (+15)
5.	(Belgium) Maes Pils	14	22	8	6	1040	1072	-32	1–1 (-15)
6.	(Italy) Benetton Treviso	14	21	7	7	1085	1072	+13	
7.	(Germany) Bayer 04 Leverkusen	14	18	4	10	1022	1045	-23	
8.	(England) Guildford Kings	14	14	0	14	889	1241	-352	

==== Quarterfinals ====
- Best-of-3 playoff: Game 1 away on March 10, 1994 / Game 2 at home on March 15, 1994 / Game 3 at home on March 17, 1994.

Team 1	Agg.	Team 2	1st leg	2nd leg	3rd leg
Buckler Beer Bologna (Italy)	1–2	(Greece) Olympiacos	77–64	69–89	62–65

==== Final four ====
The 1994 FIBA European League Final Four, was the 1993–94 season's FIBA European League Final Four tournament, organized by FIBA Europe.

- Semifinals: April 19, 1994 at Yad Eliyahu Arena in Tel Aviv, Israel.

Team 1	Score	Team 2
Olympiacos (Greece)	77–72	(Greece) Panathinaikos

- Final: April 21, 1994 at Yad Eliyahu Arena in Tel Aviv, Israel.

Team 1	Score	Team 2
Olympiacos (Greece)	57–59	(Spain) 7up Joventut

- Final four standings:

Pos.	Team	Rec.
	(Spain) 7up Joventut	2–0
Silver medal	(Greece) Olympiacos	1–1
Bronze medal	(Greece) Panathinaikos	1–1
4th	(Spain) FC Barcelona Banca Catalana	0–2

=== 1994–95 FIBA European League, 1st–tier ===
The 1994–95 FIBA European League was the 38th installment of the European top-tier level professional club competition for basketball clubs (now called EuroLeague), running from September 8, 1994 to April 13, 1995. The trophy was won by Real Madrid Teka, who defeated Olympiacos by a result of 73–61 at Pabellón Príncipe Felipe in Zaragoza, Spain. Overall, Olympiacos achieved in present competition a record of 12 wins against 7 defeats, in six successive rounds. More detailed:

==== First round ====
- Bye

==== Second round ====
- Bye

==== Top 16 ====
- Day 1 (October 27, 1994)

Team 1	Score	Team 2
Efes Pilsen (Turkey)	42–77	(Greece) Olympiacos

- Day 2 (November 2, 1994)

Team 1	Score	Team 2
Olympiacos (Greece)	101–69	(Croatia) Cibona

- Day 3 (November 24, 1994)

Team 1	Score	Team 2
7up Joventut (Spain)	75–76*	(Greece) Olympiacos

^{*}Overtime at the end of regulation (65–65).

- Day 4 (December 1, 1994)

Team 1	Score	Team 2
Olympiacos (Greece)	82–70	(Germany) Bayer 04 Leverkusen

- Day 5 (December 8, 1994)

Team 1	Score	Team 2
Limoges CSP (France)	66–59	(Greece) Olympiacos

- Day 6 (December 15, 1994)

Team 1	Score	Team 2
Buckler Beer Bologna (Italy)	72–68	(Greece) Olympiacos

- Day 7 (January 4, 1995)

Team 1	Score	Team 2
Olympiacos (Greece)	99–78	(Spain) FC Barcelona Banca Catalana

- Day 8 (January 12, 1995)

Team 1	Score	Team 2
Olympiacos (Greece)	56–79	(Turkey) Efes Pilsen

- Day 9 (January 19, 1995)

Team 1	Score	Team 2
Cibona (Croatia)	60–69	(Greece) Olympiacos

- Day 10 (January 26, 1995)

Team 1	Score	Team 2
Olympiacos (Greece)	84–53	(Spain) 7up Joventut

- Day 11 (February 2, 1995)

Team 1	Score	Team 2
Bayer 04 Leverkusen (Germany)	75–89	(Greece) Olympiacos

- Day 12 (February 9, 1995)

Team 1	Score	Team 2
Olympiacos (Greece)	73–76	(France) Limoges CSP

- Day 13 (February 16, 1995)

Team 1	Score	Team 2
Olympiacos (Greece)	89–64	(Italy) Buckler Beer Bologna

- Day 14 (February 23, 1995)

Team 1	Score	Team 2
FC Barcelona Banca Catalana (Spain)	79–64	(Greece) Olympiacos

- Group B standings:

Pos.	Team	Pld.	Pts.	W	L	PF	PA	PD	Tie-break
1.	(France) Limoges CSP	14	24	10	4	983	911	+72	
2.	(Greece) Olympiacos	14	23	9	5	1086	958	+128	
3.	(Croatia) Cibona	14	22	8	6	1049	1060	-11	4–2
4.	(Italy) Buckler Beer Bologna	14	22	8	6	1072	1023	+49	3–3 (+12)
5.	(Turkey) Efes Pilsen	14	22	8	6	900	912	-12	3–3 (-12)
6.	(Spain) FC Barcelona Banca Catalana	14	22	8	6	1095	1079	+16	2–4
7.	(Germany) Bayer 04 Leverkusen	14	18	4	10	1009	1100	-91	
8.	(Spain) 7up Joventut	14	15	1	13	923	1074	-151	

==== Quarterfinals ====
- Best-of-3 playoff: Game 1 away on March 9, 1995 / Game 2 at home on March 14, 1995 / Game 3 at home on March 16, 1995.

Team 1	Agg.	Team 2	1st leg	2nd leg	3rd leg
CSKA Moscow (Russia)	1–2	(Greece) Olympiacos	95–65	77–86	54–79

==== Final four ====
The 1995 FIBA European League Final Four, was the 1994–95 season's FIBA European League Final Four tournament, organized by FIBA Europe.

- Semifinals: April 11, 1995 at Pabellón Príncipe Felipe in Zaragoza, Spain.

Team 1	Score	Team 2
Panathinaikos (Greece)	52–58	(Greece) Olympiacos

- Final: April 13, 1995 at Pabellón Príncipe Felipe in Zaragoza, Spain.

Team 1	Score	Team 2
Real Madrid Teka (Spain)	73–61	(Greece) Olympiacos

- Final four standings:

Pos.	Team	Rec.
	(Spain) Real Madrid Teka	2–0
Silver medal	(Greece) Olympiacos	1–1
Bronze medal	(Greece) Panathinaikos	1–1
4th	(France) Limoges CSP	0–2

=== 1995–96 FIBA European League, 1st–tier ===
The 1995–96 FIBA European League was the 39th installment of the European top-tier level professional club competition for basketball clubs (now called EuroLeague), running from September 7, 1995 to April 11, 1996. The trophy was won by Panathinaikos, who defeated FC Barcelona Banca Catalana by a result of 67–66 at Palais Omnisports de Paris-Bercy in Paris, France. Overall, Olympiacos achieved in present competition a record of 11 wins against 6 defeats, in four successive rounds. More detailed:

==== First round ====
- Bye

==== Second round ====
- Bye

==== Top 16 ====
- Day 1 (October 26, 1995)

Team 1	Score	Team 2
Olympiacos (Greece)	83–72	(Italy) Benetton Treviso

- Day 2 (November 2, 1995)

Team 1	Score	Team 2
CSKA Moscow (Russia)	96–91	(Greece) Olympiacos

- Day 3 (November 23, 1995)

Team 1	Score	Team 2
Olympiacos (Greece)	92–76	(Turkey) Ülker

- Day 4 (November 29, 1995)

Team 1	Score	Team 2
Olympiacos (Greece)	82–59	(Spain) Unicaja

- Day 5 (December 7, 1995)

Team 1	Score	Team 2
Olympique Antibes (France)	97–89	(Greece) Olympiacos

- Day 6 (December 13, 1995)

Team 1	Score	Team 2
Olympiacos (Greece)	76–62	(Greece) Iraklis Aspis Pronoia

- Day 7 (December 21, 1995)

Team 1	Score	Team 2
Bayer 04 Leverkusen (Germany)	72–81*	(Greece) Olympiacos

^{*}Overtime at the end of regulation (62–62).

- Day 8 (January 4, 1996)

Team 1	Score	Team 2
Benetton Treviso (Italy)	83–77	(Greece) Olympiacos

- Day 9 (January 11, 1996)

Team 1	Score	Team 2
Olympiacos (Greece)	72–78	(Russia) CSKA Moscow

- Day 10 (January 18, 1996)

Team 1	Score	Team 2
Ülker (Turkey)	60–72	(Greece) Olympiacos

- Day 11 (January 24, 1996)

Team 1	Score	Team 2
Unicaja (Spain)	76–77*	(Greece) Olympiacos

^{*}Overtime at the end of regulation (67–67).

- Day 12 (February 1, 1996)

Team 1	Score	Team 2
Olympiacos (Greece)	98–83	(France) Olympique Antibes

- Day 13 (February 7, 1996)

Team 1	Score	Team 2
Iraklis Aspis Pronoia (Greece)	63–69	(Greece) Olympiacos

- Day 14 (February 14, 1996)

Team 1	Score	Team 2
Olympiacos (Greece)	73–69	(Germany) Bayer 04 Leverkusen

- Group A standings:

Pos.	Team	Pld.	Pts.	W	L	PF	PA	PD	Tie-break
1.	(Russia) CSKA Moscow	14	24	10	4	1162	1081	+81	3–1
2.	(Italy) Benetton Treviso	14	24	10	4	1157	1096	+61	2–2
3.	(Greece) Olympiacos	14	24	10	4	1132	1046	+86	1–3
4.	(Turkey) Ülker	14	20	6	8	1078	1104	+26	2–2 (+15)
5.	(Spain) Unicaja	14	20	6	8	1104	1081	+23	2–2 (+13)
6.	(France) Olympique Antibes	14	20	6	8	1108	1169	-61	2–2 (-28)
7.	(Germany) Bayer 04 Leverkusen	14	19	5	9	1067	1112	-45	
8.	(Greece) Iraklis Aspis Pronoia	14	17	3	11	945	1064	-119	

==== Quarterfinals ====
- Best-of-3 playoff: Game 1 at home on March 7, 1996 / Game 2 away on March 12, 1996 / Game 3 away on March 14, 1996.

Team 1	Agg.	Team 2	1st leg	2nd leg	3rd leg
Olympiacos (Greece)	1–2	(Spain) Real Madrid Teka	68–49	77–80	65–80

=== 1996–97 FIBA EuroLeague, 1st–tier ===
The 1996–97 FIBA EuroLeague was the 40th installment of the European top-tier level professional club competition for basketball clubs (now called simply EuroLeague), running from September 19, 1996 to April 24, 1997. The trophy was won by Olympiacos, who defeated FC Barcelona Banca Catalana by a result of 73–58 at PalaEUR in Rome, Italy. Overall, Olympiacos achieved in present competition a record of 15 wins against 8 defeats, in six successive rounds. More detailed:

==== First round ====
- Day 1 (September 19, 1996)

Team 1	Score	Team 2
Olympiacos (Greece)	64–67	(Germany) Alba Berlin

- Day 2 (September 26, 1996)

Team 1	Score	Team 2
Olympiacos (Greece)	96–80	(Italy) Teamsystem Bologna

- Day 3 (October 3, 1996)

Team 1	Score	Team 2
Spirou Charleroi (Belgium)	72–79*	(Greece) Olympiacos

^{*}Overtime at the end of regulation (68–68).

- Day 4 (October 10, 1996)

Team 1	Score	Team 2
Olympiacos (Greece)	62–61	(Croatia) Cibona

- Day 5 (October 17, 1996)

Team 1	Score	Team 2
Olympiacos (Greece)	110–78	(Spain) Estudiantes Argentaria

- Day 6 (November 6, 1996)

Team 1	Score	Team 2
Alba Berlin (Germany)	62–61	(Greece) Olympiacos

- Day 7 (November 13, 1996)

Team 1	Score	Team 2
Teamsystem Bologna (Italy)	81–72	(Greece) Olympiacos

^{*}Overtime at the end of regulation (66–66).

- Day 8 (November 21, 1996)

Team 1	Score	Team 2
Olympiacos (Greece)	87–60	(Belgium) Spirou Charleroi

- Day 9 (December 5, 1996)

Team 1	Score	Team 2
Cibona (Croatia)	63–61	(Greece) Olympiacos

- Day 10 (December 12, 1996)

Team 1	Score	Team 2
Estudiantes Argentaria (Spain)	87–78	(Greece) Olympiacos

- Group B standings:

Pos.	Team	Pld.	Pts.	W	L	PF	PA	PD	Tie-break
1.	(Italy) Teamsystem Bologna	10	17	7	3	773	742	+31	
2.	(Spain) Estudiantes Argentaria	10	16	6	4	798	821	-23	3–1
3.	(Croatia) Cibona	10	16	6	4	713	679	+34	2–2
4.	(Germany) Alba Berlin	10	16	6	4	755	723	+22	1–3
5.	(Greece) Olympiacos	10	15	5	5	770	711	+59	
6.	(Belgium) Spirou Charleroi	10	10	0	10	699	832	-133	

==== Second round ====
- Day 1 (January 9, 1997)

Team 1	Score	Team 2
Olympiacos (Greece)	82–51	(Russia) CSKA Moscow

- Day 2 (January 16, 1997)

Team 1	Score	Team 2
Stefanel Milano (Italy)	73–71	(Greece) Olympiacos

- Day 3 (January 23, 1997)

Team 1	Score	Team 2
Olympiacos (Greece)	69–60	(Israel) Maccabi Tel Aviv

- Day 4 (February 6, 1997)

Team 1	Score	Team 2
CSKA Moscow (Russia)	70–79	(Greece) Olympiacos

- Day 5 (February 13, 1997)

Team 1	Score	Team 2
Olympiacos (Greece)	87–84	(Italy) Stefanel Milano

- Day 6 (February 20, 1997)

Team 1	Score	Team 2
Maccabi Tel Aviv (Israel)	82–78	(Greece) Olympiacos

- Group E standings:

Pos.	Team	Pld.	Pts.	W	L	PF	PA	PD	Tie-break
1.	(Italy) Stefanel Milano	16	27	11	5	1234	1175	+59	
2.	(Germany) Alba Berlin	16	26	10	6	1193	1167	+26	
3.	(Greece) Olympiacos	16	25	9	7	1236	1131	+105	1–1 (+5)
4.	(Israel) Maccabi Tel Aviv	16	25	9	7	1209	1173	+32	1–1 (-5)
5.	(Russia) CSKA Moscow	16	24	8	8	1178	1175	+3	
6.	(Belgium) Spirou Charleroi	16	17	1	15	1123	1297	-174	

==== Top 16 ====
- Best-of-3 playoff: Game 1 away on March 6, 1997 / Game 2 at home on March 11, 1997 / Game 3 away on March 13, 1997.

Team 1	Agg.	Team 2	1st leg	2nd leg	3rd leg
Partizan (Federal Republic of Yugoslavia)	1–2	(Greece) Olympiacos	71–81	61–60	69–74

==== Quarterfinals ====
- Best-of-3 playoff: Game 1 away on March 27, 1997 / Game 2 at home on April 1, 1997.

Team 1	Agg.	Team 2	1st leg	2nd leg	3rd leg
Panathinaikos (Greece)	0–2	(Greece) Olympiacos	49–69	57–65	– – –

==== Final four ====
The 1997 FIBA EuroLeague Final Four, was the 1996–97 season's FIBA EuroLeague Final Four tournament, organized by FIBA Europe.

- Semifinals: April 22, 1997 at PalaEUR in Rome, Italy.

Team 1	Score	Team 2
Olympiacos (Greece)	74–65	(Slovenia) Smelt Olimpija

- Final: April 24, 1997 at PalaEUR in Rome, Italy.

Team 1	Score	Team 2
Olympiacos (Greece)	73–58	(Spain) FC Barcelona Banca Catalana

- Final four standings:

Pos.	Team	Rec.
	(Greece) Olympiacos	2–0
Silver medal	(Spain) FC Barcelona Banca Catalana	1–1
Bronze medal	(Slovenia) Smelt Olimpija	1–1
4th	(France) ASVEL	0–2

=== 1997–98 FIBA EuroLeague, 1st–tier ===
The 1997–98 FIBA EuroLeague was the 41st installment of the European top-tier level professional club competition for basketball clubs (now called simply EuroLeague), running from September 18, 1997 to April 23, 1998. The trophy was won by Kinder Bologna, who defeated AEK by a result of 58–44 at Palau Sant Jordi in Barcelona, Spain. Overall, Olympiacos achieved in present competition a record of 12 wins against 6 defeats, in three successive rounds. More detailed:

==== First round ====
- Day 1 (September 18, 1997)

Team 1	Score	Team 2
Efes Pilsen (Turkey)	67–70	(Greece) Olympiacos

- Day 2 (September 25, 1997)

Team 1	Score	Team 2
Olympiacos (Greece)	86–74	(Russia) CSKA Moscow

- Day 3 (October 2, 1997)

Team 1	Score	Team 2
Olympiacos (Greece)	69–57	(France) Limoges CSP

- Day 4 (October 9, 1997)

Team 1	Score	Team 2
Real Madrid Teka (Spain)	77–78	(Greece) Olympiacos

- Day 5 (October 23, 1997)

Team 1	Score	Team 2
Maccabi Tel Aviv (Israel)	73–87	(Greece) Olympiacos

- Day 6 (November 6, 1997)

Team 1	Score	Team 2
Olympiacos (Greece)	61–60	(Turkey) Efes Pilsen

- Day 7 (November 12, 1997)

Team 1	Score	Team 2
CSKA Moscow (Russia)	77–58	(Greece) Olympiacos

- Day 8 (November 20, 1997)

Team 1	Score	Team 2
Limoges CSP (France)	66–60	(Greece) Olympiacos

- Day 9 (December 11, 1997)

Team 1	Score	Team 2
Olympiacos (Greece)	82–75	(Spain) Real Madrid Teka

- Day 10 (December 18, 1997)

Team 1	Score	Team 2
Olympiacos (Greece)	71–76	(Israel) Maccabi Tel Aviv

- Group A standings:

Pos.	Team	Pld.	Pts.	W	L	PF	PA	PD	Tie-break
1.	(Greece) Olympiacos	10	17	7	3	722	702	+20	
2.	(Turkey) Efes Pilsen	10	16	6	4	718	674	+44	
3.	(Israel) Maccabi Tel Aviv	10	15	5	5	747	739	+8	1–1 (+10)
4.	(Russia) CSKA Moscow	10	15	5	5	763	756	+7	1–1 (-10)
5.	(Spain) Real Madrid Teka	10	14	4	6	787	793	–6	
6.	(France) Limoges CSP	10	13	3	7	662	735	–73	

==== Second round ====
- Day 1 (January 7, 1998)

Team 1	Score	Team 2
FC Porto (Portugal)	63–92	(Greece) Olympiacos

- Day 2 (January 15, 1998)

Team 1	Score	Team 2
Olympiacos (Greece)	90–79	(Croatia) Split

- Day 3 (January 22, 1998)

Team 1	Score	Team 2
Türk Telekom PTT (Turkey)	80–82	(Greece) Olympiacos

- Day 4 (February 4, 1998)

Team 1	Score	Team 2
Olympiacos (Greece)	73–54	(Portugal) FC Porto

- Day 5 (February 12, 1998)

Team 1	Score	Team 2
Split (Croatia)	60–53	(Greece) Olympiacos

- Day 6 (February 19, 1998)

Team 1	Score	Team 2
Olympiacos (Greece)	64–60	(Turkey) Türk Telekom PTT

- Group E standings:

Pos.	Team	Pld.	Pts.	W	L	PF	PA	PD	Tie-break
1.	(Greece) Olympiacos	16	28	12	4	1176	1098	+78	2–0
2.	(Turkey) Efes Pilsen	16	28	12	4	1232	1106	+126	0–2
3.	(Israel) Maccabi Tel Aviv	16	27	11	5	1236	1152	+84	
4.	(Croatia) Split	16	21	5	11	1185	1243	-58	1–1 (+7)
5.	(Turkey) Türk Telekom PTT	16	21	5	11	1131	1185	-54	1–1 (-7)
6.	(Portugal) FC Porto	16	16	0	16	1071	1356	-285	

==== Top 16 ====
- Best-of-3 playoff: Game 1 at home on March 3, 1998 / Game 2 away on March 5, 1998.

Team 1	Agg.	Team 2	1st leg	2nd leg	3rd leg
Olympiacos (Greece)	0–2	(Federal Republic of Yugoslavia) Partizan Zepter	74–78	60–73	– – –

=== 1998–99 FIBA EuroLeague, 1st–tier ===
The 1998–99 FIBA EuroLeague was the 42nd installment of the European top-tier level professional club competition for basketball clubs (now called simply EuroLeague), running from September 24, 1998 to April 22, 1999. The trophy was won by Žalgiris, who defeated the title holder Kinder Bologna by a result of 82–74 at Olympiahalle in Munich, Germany. Overall, Olympiacos achieved in present competition a record of 16 wins against 6 defeats, in six successive rounds. More detailed:

==== First round ====
- Day 1 (September 24, 1998)

Team 1	Score	Team 2
Kinder Bologna (Italy)	67–72	(Greece) Olympiacos

- Day 2 (October 1, 1998)

Team 1	Score	Team 2
Alba Berlin (Germany)	83–85	(Greece) Olympiacos

- Day 3 (October 8, 1998)

Team 1	Score	Team 2
Olympiacos (Greece)	58–72	(Turkey) Ülker

- Day 4 (October 15, 1998)

Team 1	Score	Team 2
Olympiacos (Greece)	71–55	(Croatia) Zadar

- Day 5 (October 22, 1998)

Team 1	Score	Team 2
CSKA Moscow (Russia)	75–81	(Greece) Olympiacos

- Day 6 (November 5, 1998)

Team 1	Score	Team 2
Olympiacos (Greece)	55–50	(Italy) Kinder Bologna

- Day 7 (November 12, 1998)

Team 1	Score	Team 2
Olympiacos (Greece)	94–65	(Germany) Alba Berlin

- Day 8 (November 19, 1998)

Team 1	Score	Team 2
Ülker (Turkey)	79–89	(Greece) Olympiacos

- Day 9 (December 10, 1998)

Team 1	Score	Team 2
Zadar (Croatia)	55–67	(Greece) Olympiacos

- Day 10 (December 18, 1998)

Team 1	Score	Team 2
Olympiacos (Greece)	74–76	(Russia) CSKA Moscow

- Group C standings:

Pos.	Team	Pld.	Pts.	W	L	PF	PA	PD	Tie-break
1.	(Greece) Olympiacos	10	18	8	2	746	677	+69	
2.	(Italy) Kinder Bologna	10	17	7	3	676	587	+89	
3.	(Russia) CSKA Moscow	10	15	5	5	752	739	+13	
4.	(Turkey) Ülker	10	14	4	6	675	726	-51	
5.	(Croatia) Zadar	10	13	3	7	660	717	-57	1–1 (+4)
6.	(Germany) Alba Berlin	10	13	3	7	725	788	-62	1–1 (-4)

==== Second round ====
- Day 1 (January 7, 1999)

Team 1	Score	Team 2
CSK VVS Samara (Russia)	70–81	(Greece) Olympiacos

- Day 2 (January 13, 1999)

Team 1	Score	Team 2
Olympiacos (Greece)	57–71	(Greece) PAOK

- Day 3 (January 21, 1999)

Team 1	Score	Team 2
Teamsystem Bologna (Italy)	60–63	(Greece) Olympiacos

- Day 4 (February 4, 1999)

Team 1	Score	Team 2
Olympiacos (Greece)	85–63	(Russia) CSK VVS Samara

- Day 5 (February 10, 1999)

Team 1	Score	Team 2
PAOK (Greece)	72–66	(Greece) Olympiacos

- Day 6 (February 17, 1999)

Team 1	Score	Team 2
Olympiacos (Greece)	62–73	(Italy) Teamsystem Bologna

- Group G standings:

Pos.	Team	Pld.	Pts.	W	L	PF	PA	PD	Tie-break
1.	(Greece) Olympiacos	16	27	11	5	1160	1086	+74	
2.	(Italy) Kinder Bologna	16	26	10	6	1099	974	+125	2–0
3.	(Russia) CSKA Moscow	16	26	10	6	1206	1155	+51	0–2
4.	(Italy) Teamsystem Bologna	16	25	9	7	1100	1039	+61	
5.	(Greece) PAOK	16	23	7	9	1128	1144	-16	
6.	(Russia) CSK VVS Samara	16	17	1	15	1067	1326	-259	

==== Top 16 ====
- Best-of-3 playoff: Game 1 at home on March 2, 1999 / Game 2 away on March 4, 1999.

Team 1	Agg.	Team 2	1st leg	2nd leg	3rd leg
Olympiacos (Greece)	2–0	(Italy) Varese Roosters	78–66	83–77*	– – –

^{*}Two Overtimes at the end of regulation (57–57 and 67–67).

==== Quarterfinals ====
- Best-of-3 playoff: Game 1 at home on March 23, 1999 / Game 2 away on March 25, 1999.

Team 1	Agg.	Team 2	1st leg	2nd leg	3rd leg
Olympiacos (Greece)	2–0	(France) ASVEL	70–57	81–77	– – –

==== Final four ====
The 1999 FIBA EuroLeague Final Four, was the 1998–99 season's FIBA EuroLeague Final Four tournament, organized by FIBA Europe.

- Semifinals: April 20, 1999 at Olympiahalle in Munich, Germany.

Team 1	Score	Team 2
Žalgiris (Lithuania)	87–71	(Greece) Olympiacos

- 3rd place game: April 22, 1999 at Olympiahalle in Munich, Germany.

Team 1	Score	Team 2
Olympiacos (Greece)	74–63	(Italy) Teamsystem Bologna

- Final four standings:

Pos.	Team	Rec.
	(Lithuania) Žalgiris	2–0
Silver medal	(Italy) Kinder Bologna	1–1
Bronze medal	(Greece) Olympiacos	1–1
4th	(Italy) Teamsystem Bologna	0–2

== 2000s ==
=== 1999–2000 FIBA EuroLeague, 1st–tier ===
The 1999–2000 FIBA EuroLeague was the 43rd installment of the European top-tier level professional club competition for basketball clubs (now called simply EuroLeague), running from September 23, 1999 to April 20, 2000. The trophy was won by Panathinaikos, who defeated Maccabi Tel Aviv by a result of 73–67 at PAOK Sports Arena in Thessaloniki, Greece. Overall, Olympiacos achieved in present competition a record of 11 wins against 8 defeats, in three successive rounds. More detailed:

==== First round ====
- Day 1 (September 23, 1999)

Team 1	Score	Team 2
Olympiacos (Greece)	65–63	(Israel) Maccabi Tel Aviv

- Day 2 (September 30, 1999)

Team 1	Score	Team 2
Olympiacos (Greece)	65–55	(France) ASVEL

- Day 3 (October 7, 1999)

Team 1	Score	Team 2
Ülker (Turkey)	64–86	(Greece) Olympiacos

- Day 4 (October 20, 1999)

Team 1	Score	Team 2
Pivovarna Laško (Slovenia)	63–56	(Greece) Olympiacos

- Day 5 (October 27, 1999)

Team 1	Score	Team 2
Olympiacos (Greece)	62–69	(Italy) Varese Roosters

- Day 6 (November 4, 1999)

Team 1	Score	Team 2
Maccabi Tel Aviv (Israel)	54–65	(Greece) Olympiacos

- Day 7 (November 10, 1999)

Team 1	Score	Team 2
ASVEL (France)	61–54	(Greece) Olympiacos

- Day 8 (November 18, 1999)

Team 1	Score	Team 2
Olympiacos (Greece)	62–73	(Turkey) Ülker

- Day 9 (December 8, 1999)

Team 1	Score	Team 2
Olympiacos (Greece)	79–68	(Slovenia) Pivovarna Laško

- Day 10 (December 18, 1999)

Team 1	Score	Team 2
Varese Roosters (Italy)	57–74	(Greece) Olympiacos

- Group C standings:

Pos.	Team	Pld.	Pts.	W	L	PF	PA	PD	Tie-break
1.	(France) ASVEL	10	18	8	2	711	645	+66	
2.	(Greece) Olympiacos	10	16	6	4	668	627	+41	2–0
3.	(Israel) Maccabi Tel Aviv	10	16	6	4	773	714	+59	0–2
4.	(Turkey) Ülker	10	15	5	5	756	770	-14	
5.	(Italy) Varese Roosters	10	13	3	7	715	762	-47	
6.	(Slovenia) Pivovarna Laško	10	12	2	8	712	817	-105	

==== Second round ====
- Day 1 (January 6, 2000)

Team 1	Score	Team 2
Caja San Fernando (Spain)	65–66	(Greece) Olympiacos

- Day 2 (January 12, 2000)

Team 1	Score	Team 2
Olympiacos (Greece)	89–61	(Federal Republic of Yugoslavia) Budućnost

- Day 3 (January 19, 2000)

Team 1	Score	Team 2
Pau-Orthez (France)	74–73	(Greece) Olympiacos

- Day 4 (February 3, 2000)

Team 1	Score	Team 2
Olympiacos (Greece)	74–63	(Spain) Caja San Fernando

- Day 5 (February 9, 2000)

Team 1	Score	Team 2
Budućnost (Federal Republic of Yugoslavia)	82–70	(Greece) Olympiacos

- Day 6 (February 16, 2000)

Team 1	Score	Team 2
Olympiacos (Greece)	77–73	(France) Pau-Orthez

- Group G standings:

Pos.	Team	Pld.	Pts.	W	L	PF	PA	PD
1.	(Israel) Maccabi Tel Aviv	16	28	12	4	1182	1050	+132
2.	(France) ASVEL	16	27	11	5	1107	1056	+51
3.	(Greece) Olympiacos	16	26	10	6	1117	1045	+72
4.	(Federal Republic of Yugoslavia) Budućnost	16	23	7	9	1164	1168	-4
5.	(Spain) Caja San Fernando	16	22	6	10	1068	1107	-39
6.	(France) Pau-Orthez	16	20	4	12	1078	1164	-86

==== Top 16 ====
- Best-of-3 playoff: Game 1 away on February 29, 2000 / Game 2 at home on March 2, 2000 / Game 3 away on March 9, 2000.

Team 1	Agg.	Team 2	1st leg	2nd leg	3rd leg
Union Olimpija (Slovenia)	2–1	(Greece) Olympiacos	65–61	52–68	85–67

=== 2000–01 Euroleague, 1st–tier ===
The 2000–01 Euroleague was the inaugural season of the EuroLeague, under the newly formed Euroleague Basketball Company's authority, and it was the 44th installment of the European top-tier level professional club competition for basketball clubs, running from October 19, 2000 to May 10, 2001. The trophy was won by Kinder Bologna, who defeated Tau Cerámica in a Best-of-5 playoff final series by a result of 3–2. Overall, Olympiacos achieved in present competition a record of 9 wins against 5 defeats, in three successive rounds. More detailed:

==== Regular season ====
- Day 1 (October 16, 2000)*

Team 1	Score	Team 2
Real Madrid Teka (Spain)	75–73	(Greece) Olympiacos

^{*}Opening Euroleague game, played on 16-10-2001.

- Day 2 (October 26, 2000)

Team 1	Score	Team 2
Olympiacos (Greece)	82–73	(Italy) Benetton Treviso

- Day 3 (November 2, 2000)

Team 1	Score	Team 2
Union Olimpija (Slovenia)	69–73	(Greece) Olympiacos

- Day 4 (November 9, 2000)

Team 1	Score	Team 2
Ovarense Aerosoles (Portugal)	53–100	(Greece) Olympiacos

- Day 5 (November 16, 2000)

Team 1	Score	Team 2
Olympiacos (Greece)	102–69	(Israel) Hapoel Jerusalem

- Day 6 (December 6, 2000)

Team 1	Score	Team 2
Olympiacos (Greece)	91–84	(Spain) Real Madrid Teka

- Day 7 (December 14, 2000)

Team 1	Score	Team 2
Benetton Treviso (Italy)	95–87	(Greece) Olympiacos

- Day 8 (December 21, 2000)

Team 1	Score	Team 2
Olympiacos (Greece)	82–70	(Slovenia) Union Olimpija

- Day 9 (January 11, 2001)

Team 1	Score	Team 2
Olympiacos (Greece)	101–67	(Portugal) Ovarense Aerosoles

- Day 10 (January 18, 2001)

Team 1	Score	Team 2
Hapoel Jerusalem (Israel)	83–70	(Greece) Olympiacos

- Group C standings:

Pos.	Team	Pld.	W	L	PF	PA	PD	Tie-break
1.	(Greece) Olympiacos	10	7	3	861	738	+123	3–1
2.	(Spain) Real Madrid Teka	10	7	3	859	789	+70	2–2
3.	(Slovenia) Union Olimpija	10	7	3	823	752	+71	1–3
4.	(Italy) Benetton Treviso	10	6	4	847	777	+70	
5.	(Israel) Hapoel Jerusalem	10	3	7	784	881	-97	
6.	(Portugal) Ovarense Aerosoles	10	0	10	746	983	-237	

==== Top 16 ====
- Best-of-3 playoff: Game 1 at home on January 31, 2001 / Game 2 away on February 7, 2001 / Game 3 at home on February 15, 2001.

Team 1	Agg.	Team 2	1st leg	2nd leg	3rd leg
Olympiacos (Greece)	2–0	(Italy) Müller Verona	94–92	96–84	– – –

==== Quarterfinals ====
- Best-of-3 playoff: Game 1 at home on February 22, 2001 / Game 2 away on February 28, 2001.

Team 1	Agg.	Team 2	1st leg	2nd leg	3rd leg
Olympiacos (Greece)	0–2	(Spain) Tau Cerámica	72–78	76–98	– – –

=== 2001–02 Euroleague, 1st–tier ===
The 2001–02 Euroleague was the 2nd season of the EuroLeague, under the newly formed Euroleague Basketball Company's authority, and it was the 45th installment of the European top-tier level professional club competition for basketball clubs, running from October 10, 2001 to May 5, 2002. The trophy was won by Panathinaikos, who defeated the title holder Kinder Bologna by a result of 89–83 at PalaMalaguti in Bologna, Italy. Overall, Olympiacos achieved in present competition a record of 14 wins against 6 defeats, in two successive rounds. More detailed:

==== Regular season ====
- Day 1 (October 10, 2001)

Team 1	Score	Team 2
Olympiacos (Greece)	87–72	(Turkey) Efes Pilsen

- Day 2 (October 17, 2001)

Team 1	Score	Team 2
Alba Berlin (Germany)	69–88	(Greece) Olympiacos

- Day 3 (October 24, 2001)

Team 1	Score	Team 2
Olympiacos (Greece)	101–79	(Poland) Idea Śląsk

- Day 4 (October 31, 2001)

Team 1	Score	Team 2
Unicaja (Spain)	86–79	(Greece) Olympiacos

- Day 5 (November 7, 2001)

Team 1	Score	Team 2
Olympiacos (Greece)	107–78	(Belgium) Spirou Charleroi

- Day 6 (November 15, 2001)

Team 1	Score	Team 2
Maccabi Tel Aviv (Israel)	78–73	(Greece) Olympiacos

- Day 7 (December 5, 2001)

Team 1	Score	Team 2
Olympiacos (Greece)	87–91	(Italy) Benetton Treviso

- Day 8 (December 12, 2001)

Team 1	Score	Team 2
Efes Pilsen (Turkey)	79–80	(Greece) Olympiacos

- Day 9 (December 19, 2001)

Team 1	Score	Team 2
Olympiacos (Greece)	91–75	(Germany) Alba Berlin

- Day 10 (January 9, 2002)

Team 1	Score	Team 2
Idea Śląsk (Poland)	75–80	(Greece) Olympiacos

- Day 11 (January 16, 2002)

Team 1	Score	Team 2
Olympiacos (Greece)	81–80	(Spain) Unicaja

- Day 12 (January 30, 2002)

Team 1	Score	Team 2
Spirou Charleroi (Belgium)	56–76	(Greece) Olympiacos

- Day 13 (February 7, 2002)

Team 1	Score	Team 2
Olympiacos (Greece)	94–91*	(Israel) Maccabi Tel Aviv

^{*}Overtime at the end of regulation (78–78).

- Day 14 (February 13, 2002)

Team 1	Score	Team 2
Benetton Treviso (Italy)	89–81	(Greece) Olympiacos

- Group A standings:

Pos.	Team	Pld.	W	L	PF	PA	PD	Tie-break
1.	(Italy) Benetton Treviso	14	11	3	1206	1142	+64	
2.	(Israel) Maccabi Tel Aviv	14	10	4	1101	1021	+80	1–1 (+2)
3.	(Greece) Olympiacos	14	10	4	1205	1098	+107	1–1 (-2)
4.	(Turkey) Efes Pilsen	14	9	5	1059	1032	+27	
5.	(Spain) Unicaja	14	6	8	1054	1052	+2	
6.	(Poland) Idea Śląsk	14	4	10	1001	1061	-60	
7.	(Germany) Alba Berlin	14	3	11	1065	1153	-88	1–1 (+3)
8.	(Belgium) Spirou Charleroi	14	3	11	1049	1181	-132	1–1 (-3)

==== Top 16 ====
- Day 1 (February 28, 2002)

Team 1	Score	Team 2
Olympiacos (Greece)	92–75	(Greece) Panathinaikos

- Day 2 (March 7, 2002)

Team 1	Score	Team 2
Olympiacos (Greece)	75–69	(Greece) AEK

- Day 3 (March 21, 2002)

Team 1	Score	Team 2
Union Olimpija (Slovenia)	66–75	(Greece) Olympiacos

- Day 4 (March 28, 2002)

Team 1	Score	Team 2
Panathinaikos (Greece)	88–78	(Greece) Olympiacos

- Day 5 (April 11, 2002)

Team 1	Score	Team 2
Olympiacos (Greece)	85–89*	(Slovenia) Union Olimpija

^{*}Overtime at the end of regulation (75–75).

- Day 6 (April 18, 2002)

Team 1	Score	Team 2
AEK (Greece)	65–75	(Greece) Olympiacos

- Group G standings:

Pos.	Team	Pld.	W	L	PF	PA	PD
1.	(Greece) Panathinaikos	6	5	1	496	467	+29
2.	(Greece) Olympiacos	6	4	2	480	452	+28
3.	(Greece) AEK	6	2	4	474	475	-1
4.	(Slovenia) Union Olimpija	6	1	5	450	506	-56

=== 2002–03 Euroleague, 1st–tier ===
The 2002–03 Euroleague was the 3rd season of the EuroLeague, under the newly formed Euroleague Basketball Company's authority, and it was the 46th installment of the European top-tier level professional club competition for basketball clubs, running from October 10, 2002 to May 11, 2003. The trophy was won by FC Barcelona, who defeated Benetton Treviso by a result of 76–65 at Palau Sant Jordi in Barcelona, Spain. Overall, Olympiacos achieved in present competition a record of 10 wins against 10 defeats, in two successive rounds. More detailed:

==== Regular season ====
- Day 1 (October 9, 2002)

Team 1	Score	Team 2
Idea Śląsk (Poland)	72–91	(Greece) Olympiacos

- Day 2 (October 17, 2002)

Team 1	Score	Team 2
Olympiacos (Greece)	71–77	(Turkey) Ülker

- Day 3 (October 23, 2002)

Team 1	Score	Team 2
CSKA Moscow (Russia)	74–67	(Greece) Olympiacos

- Day 4 (October 30, 2002)

Team 1	Score	Team 2
Olympiacos (Greece)	78–80	(Serbia and Montenegro) Partizan Mobtel

- Day 5 (November 7, 2002)

Team 1	Score	Team 2
Olympiacos (Greece)	83–77	(France) ASVEL

- Day 6 (November 14, 2002)

Team 1	Score	Team 2
Real Madrid (Spain)	73–66	(Greece) Olympiacos

- Day 7 (December 5, 2002)

Team 1	Score	Team 2
Olympiacos (Greece)	80–66	(Italy) Virtus Bologna

- Day 8 (December 11, 2002)

Team 1	Score	Team 2
Olympiacos (Greece)	78–71	(Poland) Idea Śląsk

- Day 9 (December 18, 2002)

Team 1	Score	Team 2
Ülker (Turkey)	65–82	(Greece) Olympiacos

- Day 10 (January 9, 2003)

Team 1	Score	Team 2
Olympiacos (Greece)	77–79	(Russia) CSKA Moscow

- Day 11 (January 15, 2003)

Team 1	Score	Team 2
Partizan Mobtel (Serbia and Montenegro)	81–71	(Greece) Olympiacos

- Day 12 (January 30, 2003)

Team 1	Score	Team 2
ASVEL (France)	85–74	(Greece) Olympiacos

- Day 13 (February 6, 2003)

Team 1	Score	Team 2
Olympiacos (Greece)	71–68	(Spain) Real Madrid

- Day 14 (February 12, 2003)

Team 1	Score	Team 2
Virtus Bologna (Italy)	73–77	(Greece) Olympiacos

- Group C standings:

Pos.	Team	Pld.	W	L	PF	PA	PD	Tie-break
1.	(Russia) CSKA Moscow	14	12	2	1148	1004	+144	
2.	(Turkey) Ülker	14	10	4	1115	1064	+51	
3.	(Greece) Olympiacos	14	7	7	1066	1041	+25	
4.	(Italy) Virtus Bologna	14	6	8	1102	1119	-17	3–1
5.	(France) ASVEL	14	6	8	1114	1138	-24	2–2
6.	(Spain) Real Madrid	14	6	8	1094	1113	-19	1–3
7.	(Poland) Idea Śląsk	14	5	9	1039	1125	-86	
8.	(Serbia and Montenegro) Partizan Mobtel	14	4	10	1109	1183	-74	

==== Top 16 ====
- Day 1 (February 27, 2003)

Team 1	Score	Team 2
Union Olimpija (Slovenia)	72–74	(Greece) Olympiacos

- Day 2 (March 5, 2003)

Team 1	Score	Team 2
Olympiacos (Greece)	69–59	(France) ASVEL

- Day 3 (March 20, 2003)

Team 1	Score	Team 2
FC Barcelona (Spain)	80–77	(Greece) Olympiacos

- Day 4 (March 27, 2003)

Team 1	Score	Team 2
Olympiacos (Greece)	73–61	(Slovenia) Union Olimpija

- Day 5 (April 10, 2003)

Team 1	Score	Team 2
Olympiacos (Greece)	55–58	(Spain) FC Barcelona

- Day 6 (April 17, 2003)

Team 1	Score	Team 2
ASVEL (France)	89–79	(Greece) Olympiacos

- Group G standings:

Pos.	Team	Pld.	W	L	PF	PA	PD	Tie-break
1.	(Spain) FC Barcelona	6	5	1	448	424	+24	
2.	(Greece) Olympiacos	6	3	3	427	419	+8	2–0
3.	(Slovenia) Union Olimpija	6	3	3	445	438	+7	0–2
4.	(France) ASVEL	6	1	5	436	475	-39	

=== 2003–04 Euroleague, 1st–tier ===
The 2003–04 Euroleague was the 4th season of the EuroLeague, under the newly formed Euroleague Basketball Company's authority, and it was the 47th installment of the European top-tier level professional club competition for basketball clubs, running from November 6, 2003 to May 1, 2004. The trophy was won by Maccabi Tel Aviv, who defeated Skipper Bologna by a result of 118–74 at Nokia Arena in Tel Aviv, Israel. Overall, Olympiacos achieved in present competition a record of 8 wins against 12 defeats, in two successive rounds. More detailed:

==== Regular season ====
- Day 1 (November 6, 2003)

Team 1	Score	Team 2
Idea Śląsk (Poland)	82–80	(Greece) Olympiacos

- Day 2 (November 13, 2003)

Team 1	Score	Team 2
Olympiacos (Greece)	69–77	(Spain) Pamesa Valencia

- Day 3 (November 20, 2003)

Team 1	Score	Team 2
Tau Cerámica (Spain)	92–77	(Greece) Olympiacos

- Day 4 (November 27, 2003)

Team 1	Score	Team 2
Olympiacos (Greece)	57–69	(Turkey) Efes Pilsen

- Day 5 (December 3, 2003)

Team 1	Score	Team 2
Benetton Treviso (Italy)	80–75	(Greece) Olympiacos

- Day 6 (December 11, 2003)

Team 1	Score	Team 2
Adecco ASVEL (France)	77–92	(Greece) Olympiacos

- Day 7 (December 18, 2003)

Team 1	Score	Team 2
Olympiacos (Greece)	96–95*	(Germany) Alba Berlin

^{*}Overtime at the end of regulation (87–87).

- Day 8 (January 8, 2004)

Team 1	Score	Team 2
Olympiacos (Greece)	98–92	(Poland) Idea Śląsk

- Day 9 (January 15, 2004)

Team 1	Score	Team 2
Pamesa Valencia (Spain)	78–90	(Greece) Olympiacos

- Day 10 (January 21, 2004)

Team 1	Score	Team 2
Olympiacos (Greece)	81–72	(Spain) Tau Cerámica

- Day 11 (January 29, 2004)

Team 1	Score	Team 2
Efes Pilsen (Turkey)	61–52	(Greece) Olympiacos

- Day 12 (February 5, 2004)

Team 1	Score	Team 2
Olympiacos (Greece)	89–102	(Italy) Benetton Treviso

- Day 13 (February 12, 2004)

Team 1	Score	Team 2
Olympiacos (Greece)	82–61	(France) Adecco ASVEL

- Day 14 (February 18, 2004)

Team 1	Score	Team 2
Alba Berlin (Germany)	70–71	(Greece) Olympiacos

- Group C standings:

Pos.	Team	Pld.	W	L	PF	PA	PD	Tie-break
1.	(Turkey) Efes Pilsen	14	10	4	1066	1002	+64	1–1 (+2)
2.	(Italy) Benetton Treviso	14	10	4	1185	1067	+118	1–1 (-2)
3.	(Spain) Pamesa Valencia	14	9	5	1149	1089	+60	1–1 (+7)
4.	(Spain) Tau Cerámica	14	9	5	1183	1127	+56	1–1 (-7)
5.	(Greece) Olympiacos	14	7	7	1109	1108	+1	
6.	(Poland) Idea Śląsk	14	6	8	1110	1163	-53	
7.	(Germany) Alba Berlin	14	3	11	1075	1170	-95	
8.	(France) Adecco ASVEL	14	2	12	982	1133	-151	

==== Top 16 ====
- Day 1 (March 3, 2004)

Team 1	Score	Team 2
CSKA Moscow (Russia)	80–66	(Greece) Olympiacos

- Day 2 (March 10, 2004)

Team 1	Score	Team 2
Olympiacos (Greece)	83–85	(Spain) Tau Cerámica

- Day 3 (March 17, 2004)

Team 1	Score	Team 2
Cibona VIP (Croatia)	62–68	(Greece) Olympiacos

- Day 4 (March 24, 2004)

Team 1	Score	Team 2
Olympiacos (Greece)	69–93	(Russia) CSKA Moscow

- Day 5 (March 31, 2004)

Team 1	Score	Team 2
Olympiacos (Greece)	68–70	(Croatia) Cibona VIP

- Day 6 (April 7, 2004)

Team 1	Score	Team 2
Tau Cerámica (Spain)	87–82	(Greece) Olympiacos

- Group D standings:

Pos.	Team	Pld.	W	L	PF	PA	PD
1.	(Russia) CSKA Moscow	6	5	1	477	436	+41
2.	(Spain) Tau Cerámica	6	4	2	505	477	+28
3.	(Croatia) Cibona VIP	6	2	4	422	449	-27
4.	(Greece) Olympiacos	6	1	5	436	477	-41

=== 2004–05 Euroleague, 1st–tier ===
The 2004–05 Euroleague was the 5th season of the EuroLeague, under the newly formed Euroleague Basketball Company's authority, and it was the 48th installment of the European top-tier level professional club competition for basketball clubs, running from November 4, 2004 to May 8, 2005. The trophy was won by the title holder Maccabi Tel Aviv, who defeated Tau Cerámica by a result of 90–78 at Olimpiisky Arena in Moscow, Russia. Overall, Olympiacos achieved in present competition a record of 4 wins against 10 defeats, in only one round. More detailed:

==== Regular season ====
- Day 1 (November 3, 2004)

Team 1	Score	Team 2
Olympiacos (Greece)	71–76	(Italy) Climamio Bologna

- Day 2 (November 10, 2004)

Team 1	Score	Team 2
Cibona VIP (Croatia)	60–64	(Greece) Olympiacos

- Day 3 (November 17, 2004)

Team 1	Score	Team 2
Olympiacos (Greece)	75–77	(Poland) Prokom Trefl Sopot

- Day 4 (November 25, 2004)

Team 1	Score	Team 2
Real Madrid (Spain)	76–62	(Greece) Olympiacos

- Day 5 (December 2, 2004)

Team 1	Score	Team 2
Partizan Pivara MB (Serbia and Montenegro)	87–73	(Greece) Olympiacos

- Day 6 (December 9, 2004)

Team 1	Score	Team 2
Olympiacos (Greece)	59–110	(Turkey) Efes Pilsen

- Day 7 (December 16, 2004)

Team 1	Score	Team 2
Adecco Estudiantes (Spain)	87–57	(Greece) Olympiacos

- Day 8 (December 22, 2004)

Team 1	Score	Team 2
Climamio Bologna (Italy)	94–77	(Greece) Olympiacos

- Day 9 (January 6, 2005)

Team 1	Score	Team 2
Olympiacos (Greece)	89–83*	(Croatia) Cibona VIP

^{*}Overtime at the end of regulation (75–75).

- Day 10 (January 12, 2005)

Team 1	Score	Team 2
Prokom Trefl Sopot (Poland)	77–71	(Greece) Olympiacos

- Day 11 (January 20, 2005)

Team 1	Score	Team 2
Olympiacos (Greece)	75–83	(Spain) Real Madrid

- Day 12 (January 26, 2005)

Team 1	Score	Team 2
Olympiacos (Greece)	100–74	(Serbia and Montenegro) Partizan Pivara MB

- Day 13 (February 2, 2005)

Team 1	Score	Team 2
Efes Pilsen (Turkey)	80–54	(Greece) Olympiacos

- Day 14 (February 10, 2005)

Team 1	Score	Team 2
Olympiacos (Greece)	90–80	(Spain) Adecco Estudiantes

- Group A standings:

Pos.	Team	Pld.	W	L	PF	PA	PD	Tie-break
1.	(Italy) Climamio Bologna	14	12	2	1199	1103	+96	1–1 (+15)
2.	(Turkey) Efes Pilsen	14	12	2	1080	934	+146	1–1 (-15)
3.	(Croatia) Cibona VIP	14	8	6	1172	1037	+47	
4.	(Spain) Real Madrid	14	7	7	1056	1020	+36	2–0
5.	(Poland) Prokom Trefl Sopot	14	7	7	981	1028	-47	0–2
6.	(Spain) Adecco Estudiantes	14	4	10	1074	1109	-35	1–1 (+20)
7.	(Greece) Olympiacos	14	4	10	1017	1144	-127	1–1 (-20)
8.	(Serbia and Montenegro) Partizan Pivara MB	14	2	12	1030	1146	-116	

=== 2005–06 Euroleague, 1st–tier ===
The 2005–06 Euroleague was the 6th season of the EuroLeague, under the Euroleague Basketball Company's authority, and it was the 49th installment of the European top-tier level professional club competition for basketball clubs, running from November 3, 2005 to April 30, 2006. The trophy was won by CSKA Moscow, who defeated the title holder Maccabi Tel Aviv by a result of 73–69 at Sazka Arena in Prague, Czech Republic. Overall, Olympiacos achieved in present competition a record of 12 wins against 11 defeats, in three successive rounds. More detailed:

==== Regular season ====
- Day 1 (November 3, 2005)

Team 1	Score	Team 2
Winterthur FC Barcelona (Spain)	86–70	(Greece) Olympiacos

- Day 2 (November 10, 2005)

Team 1	Score	Team 2
Olympiacos (Greece)	83–78	(Israel) Maccabi Tel Aviv

- Day 3 (November 17, 2005)

Team 1	Score	Team 2
Olympiacos (Greece)	75–78*	(Turkey) Efes Pilsen

^{*}Overtime at the end of regulation (71–71).

- Day 4 (November 23, 2005)

Team 1	Score	Team 2
Lietuvos rytas (Lithuania)	78–67	(Greece) Olympiacos

- Day 5 (November 30, 2005)

Team 1	Score	Team 2
Olympiacos (Greece)	70–65	(Poland) Prokom Trefl Sopot

- Day 6 (December 8, 2005)

Team 1	Score	Team 2
Cibona VIP (Croatia)	74–62	(Greece) Olympiacos

- Day 7 (December 14, 2005)

Team 1	Score	Team 2
Olympiacos (Greece)	89–67	(Italy) Armani Jeans Milano

- Day 8 (December 22, 2005)

Team 1	Score	Team 2
Olympiacos (Greece)	80–68	(Spain) Winterthur FC Barcelona

- Day 9 (January 5, 2006)

Team 1	Score	Team 2
Maccabi Tel Aviv (Israel)	101–95	(Greece) Olympiacos

- Day 10 (January 11, 2006)

Team 1	Score	Team 2
Efes Pilsen (Turkey)	77–69	(Greece) Olympiacos

- Day 11 (January 18, 2006)

Team 1	Score	Team 2
Olympiacos (Greece)	65–63	(Lithuania) Lietuvos rytas

- Day 12 (January 25, 2006)

Team 1	Score	Team 2
Prokom Trefl Sopot (Poland)	79–77	(Greece) Olympiacos

- Day 13 (February 1, 2006)

Team 1	Score	Team 2
Olympiacos (Greece)	99–70	(Croatia) Cibona VIP

- Day 14 (February 9, 2006)

Team 1	Score	Team 2
Armani Jeans Milano (Italy)	75–84	(Greece) Olympiacos

- Group B standings:

Pos.	Team	Pld.	W	L	PF	PA	PD	Tie-break
1.	(Israel) Maccabi Tel Aviv	14	9	5	1220	1135	+85	1–1 (+5)
2.	(Turkey) Efes Pilsen	14	9	5	1025	995	+30	1–1 (-5)
3.	(Spain) Winterthur FC Barcelona	14	8	6	1079	1021	+58	1–1 (+4)
4.	(Lithuania) Lietuvos rytas	14	8	6	1068	1012	+56	1–1 (-4)
5.	(Greece) Olympiacos	14	7	7	1085	1059	+26	
6.	(Croatia) Cibona VIP	14	6	8	917	1054	-137	
7.	(Poland) Prokom Trefl Sopot	14	5	9	997	1066	-69	2–0
8.	(Italy) Armani Jeans Milano	14	5	9	1036	1085	-49	0–2

==== Top 16 ====
- Day 1 (February 22, 2006)

Team 1	Score	Team 2
Olympiacos (Greece)	87–84	(Spain) Unicaja

- Day 2 (March 2, 2006)

Team 1	Score	Team 2
Olympiacos (Greece)	78–69	(Lithuania) Žalgiris

- Day 3 (March 9, 2006)

Team 1	Score	Team 2
Winterthur FC Barcelona (Spain)	76–72	(Greece) Olympiacos

- Day 4 (March 14, 2006)

Team 1	Score	Team 2
Unicaja (Spain)	75–87	(Greece) Olympiacos

- Day 5 (March 23, 2006)

Team 1	Score	Team 2
Olympiacos (Greece)	67–74	(Spain) Winterthur FC Barcelona

- Day 6 (March 30, 2006)

Team 1	Score	Team 2
Žalgiris (Lithuania)	72–99	(Greece) Olympiacos

- Group D standings:

Pos.	Team	Pld.	W	L	PF	PA	PD
1.	(Spain) Winterthur FC Barcelona	6	5	1	448	434	+14
2.	(Greece) Olympiacos	6	4	2	490	450	+40
3.	(Spain) Unicaja	6	3	3	447	435	+12
4.	(Lithuania) Žalgiris	6	0	6	425	491	−66

==== Quarterfinals ====
- Best-of-3 playoff: Game 1 away on April 4, 2006 / Game 2 at home on April 6, 2006 / Game 3 away on April 13, 2006.

Team 1	Agg.	Team 2	1st leg	2nd leg	3rd leg
Maccabi Tel Aviv (Israel)	2–1	(Greece) Olympiacos	87–78	70–76	77–73

=== 2006–07 Euroleague, 1st–tier ===
The 2006–07 Euroleague was the 7th season of the EuroLeague, under the Euroleague Basketball Company's authority, and it was the 50th installment of the European top-tier level professional club competition for basketball clubs, running from October 26, 2006 to May 6, 2007. The trophy was won by Panathinaikos, who defeated the title holder CSKA Moscow by a result of 93–91 at O.A.C.A. Olympic Indoor Hall in Athens, Greece. Overall, Olympiacos achieved in present competition a record of 13 wins against 9 defeats, in three successive rounds. More detailed:

==== Regular season ====
- Day 1 (October 25, 2006)

Team 1	Score	Team 2
Olympiacos (Greece)	97–78	(Spain) Tau Cerámica

- Day 2 (November 1, 2006)

Team 1	Score	Team 2
Climamio Bologna (Italy)	86–93	(Greece) Olympiacos

- Day 3 (November 9, 2006)

Team 1	Score	Team 2
Olympiacos (Greece)	97–74	(Poland) Prokom Trefl Sopot

- Day 4 (November 16, 2006)

Team 1	Score	Team 2
Le Mans Sarthe (France)	81–88	(Greece) Olympiacos

- Day 5 (November 22, 2006)

Team 1	Score	Team 2
Efes Pilsen (Turkey)	95–77	(Greece) Olympiacos

- Day 6 (November 30, 2006)

Team 1	Score	Team 2
Olympiacos (Greece)	86–73	(Russia) Dynamo Moscow

- Day 7 (December 6, 2006)

Team 1	Score	Team 2
RheinEnergie Köln (Germany)	81–88	(Greece) Olympiacos

- Day 8 (December 13, 2006)

Team 1	Score	Team 2
Tau Cerámica (Spain)	89–74	(Greece) Olympiacos

- Day 9 (December 20, 2006)

Team 1	Score	Team 2
Olympiacos (Greece)	94–67	(Italy) Climamio Bologna

- Day 10 (January 4, 2007)

Team 1	Score	Team 2
Prokom Trefl Sopot (Poland)	64–73	(Greece) Olympiacos

- Day 11 (January 11, 2007)

Team 1	Score	Team 2
Olympiacos (Greece)	80–76	(France) Le Mans Sarthe

- Day 12 (January 17, 2007)

Team 1	Score	Team 2
Olympiacos (Greece)	72–91	(Turkey) Efes Pilsen

- Day 13 (January 25, 2007)

Team 1	Score	Team 2
Dynamo Moscow (Russia)	84–69	(Greece) Olympiacos

- Day 14 (February 1, 2007)

Team 1	Score	Team 2
Olympiacos (Greece)	77–73	(Germany) RheinEnergie Köln

- Group A standings:

Pos.	Team	Pld.	W	L	PF	PA	PD	Tie-break
1.	(Spain) Tau Cerámica	14	12	2	1165	1025	+140	
2.	(Russia) Dynamo Moscow	14	10	4	1100	1032	+68	1–1 (+2)
3.	(Greece) Olympiacos	14	10	4	1165	1112	+53	1–1 (-2)
4.	(Turkey) Efes Pilsen	14	8	6	1081	1031	+50	
5.	(Poland) Prokom Trefl Sopot	14	5	9	1021	1063	-42	1–1 (+8)
6.	(Italy) Climamio Bologna	14	5	9	1115	1176	-61	1–1 (-8)
7.	(France) Le Mans Sarthe	14	4	10	985	1041	-56	
8.	(Germany) RheinEnergie Köln	14	2	12	1032	1184	-152	

==== Top 16 ====
- Day 1 (February 14, 2007)

Team 1	Score	Team 2
Partizan (Serbia)	84–92	(Greece) Olympiacos

- Day 2 (February 22, 2007)

Team 1	Score	Team 2
DKV Joventut (Spain)	58–56	(Greece) Olympiacos

- Day 3 (March 1, 2007)

Team 1	Score	Team 2
Olympiacos (Greece)	64–85	(Russia) CSKA Moscow

- Day 4 (March 7, 2007)

Team 1	Score	Team 2
Olympiacos (Greece)	79–75	(Serbia) Partizan

- Day 5 (March 14, 2007)

Team 1	Score	Team 2
CSKA Moscow (Russia)	83–79	(Greece) Olympiacos

- Day 6 (March 22, 2007)

Team 1	Score	Team 2
Olympiacos (Greece)	81–65	(Spain) DKV Joventut

- Group E standings:

Pos.	Team	Pld.	W	L	PF	PA	PD
1.	(Russia) CSKA Moscow	6	6	0	475	376	+99
2.	(Greece) Olympiacos	6	3	3	451	450	+1
3.	(Serbia) Partizan	6	2	4	432	474	-42
4.	(Spain) DKV Joventut	6	1	5	407	465	-58

==== Quarterfinals ====
- Best-of-3 playoff: Game 1 away on April 3, 2007 / Game 2 at home on April 5, 2007.

Team 1	Agg.	Team 2	1st leg	2nd leg	3rd leg
Tau Cerámica (Spain)	2–0	(Greece) Olympiacos	84–59	95–89	– – –

=== 2007–08 Euroleague, 1st–tier ===
The 2007–08 Euroleague was the 8th season of the EuroLeague, under the Euroleague Basketball Company's authority, and it was the 51st installment of the European top-tier level professional club competition for basketball clubs, running from October 25, 2007 to May 4, 2008. The trophy was won by CSKA Moscow, who defeated Maccabi Tel Aviv by a result of 91–77 at Palacio de Deportes de la Comunidad de Madrid in Madrid, Spain. Overall, Olympiacos achieved in present competition a record of 12 wins against 11 defeats, in three successive rounds. More detailed:

==== Regular season ====
- Day 1 (October 25, 2007)

Team 1	Score	Team 2
Olympiacos (Greece)	95–90	(Spain) Tau Cerámica

- Day 2 (November 1, 2007)

Team 1	Score	Team 2
Union Olimpija (Slovenia)	87–78	(Greece) Olympiacos

- Day 3 (November 8, 2007)

Team 1	Score	Team 2
Olympiacos (Greece)	104–76	(Italy) VidiVici Bologna

- Day 4 (November 14, 2007)

Team 1	Score	Team 2
CSKA Moscow (Russia)	88–79	(Greece) Olympiacos

- Day 5 (November 21, 2007)

Team 1	Score	Team 2
Olympiacos (Greece)	109–65	(Poland) Prokom Trefl Sopot

- Day 6 (November 29, 2007)

Team 1	Score	Team 2
Olympiacos (Greece)	90–74	(Lithuania) Žalgiris

- Day 7 (December 5, 2007)

Team 1	Score	Team 2
Montepaschi Siena (Italy)	86–84	(Greece) Olympiacos

- Day 8 (December 12, 2007)

Team 1	Score	Team 2
Tau Cerámica (Spain)	75–64	(Greece) Olympiacos

- Day 9 (December 19, 2007)

Team 1	Score	Team 2
Olympiacos (Greece)	113–80	(Slovenia) Union Olimpija

- Day 10 (January 3, 2008)

Team 1	Score	Team 2
VidiVici Bologna (Italy)	80–91	(Greece) Olympiacos

- Day 11 (January 10, 2008)

Team 1	Score	Team 2
Olympiacos (Greece)	71–67	(Russia) CSKA Moscow

- Day 12 (January 17, 2008)

Team 1	Score	Team 2
Prokom Trefl Sopot (Poland)	63–59	(Greece) Olympiacos

- Day 13 (January 24, 2008)

Team 1	Score	Team 2
Žalgiris (Lithuania)	88–75	(Greece) Olympiacos

- Day 14 (February 1, 2008)

Team 1	Score	Team 2
Olympiacos (Greece)	73–80	(Italy) Montepaschi Siena

- Group A standings:

Pos.	Team	Pld.	W	L	PF	PA	PD	Tie-break
1.	(Russia) CSKA Moscow	14	12	2	1123	942	+181	
2.	(Italy) Montepaschi Siena	14	10	4	1098	974	+124	
3.	(Spain) Tau Cerámica	14	9	5	1170	1051	+119	
4.	(Lithuania) Žalgiris	14	8	6	1110	1126	-16	
5.	(Greece) Olympiacos	14	7	7	1185	1099	+86	
6.	(Slovenia) Union Olimpija	14	4	10	1030	1147	-117	1–1 (+8)
7.	(Poland) Prokom Trefl Sopot	14	4	10	973	1143	-170	1–1 (-8)
8.	(Italy) VidiVici Bologna	14	2	12	1008	1215	-207	

==== Top 16 ====
- Day 1 (February 14, 2008)

Team 1	Score	Team 2
Olympiacos (Greece)	67–75	(Israel) Maccabi Tel Aviv

- Day 2 (February 21, 2008)

Team 1	Score	Team 2
Real Madrid (Spain)	80–70	(Greece) Olympiacos

- Day 3 (February 27, 2008)

Team 1	Score	Team 2
Olympiacos (Greece)	86–84*	(Lithuania) Žalgiris

^{*}Overtime at the end of regulation (72–72).

- Day 4 (March 6, 2008)

Team 1	Score	Team 2
Maccabi Tel Aviv (Israel)	82–87	(Greece) Olympiacos

- Day 5 (March 13, 2008)

Team 1	Score	Team 2
Žalgiris (Lithuania)	52–61	(Greece) Olympiacos

- Day 6 (March 22, 2008)

Team 1	Score	Team 2
Olympiacos (Greece)	72–63	(Spain) Real Madrid

- Group F standings:

Pos.	Team	Pld.	W	L	PF	PA	PD	Tie-break
1.	(Israel) Maccabi Tel Aviv	6	4	2	516	496	+20	1–1 (+3)
2.	(Greece) Olympiacos	6	4	2	443	436	+7	1–1 (-3)
3.	(Spain) Real Madrid	6	3	3	489	493	-4	
4.	(Lithuania) Žalgiris	6	1	5	457	480	-23	

==== Quarterfinals ====
- Best-of-3 playoff: Game 1 away on April 1, 2008 / Game 2 at home on April 3, 2008 / Game 3 away on April 9, 2008.

Team 1	Agg.	Team 2	1st leg	2nd leg	3rd leg
CSKA Moscow (Russia)	2–1	(Greece) Olympiacos	74–76	83–73	81–56

=== 2008–09 Euroleague, 1st–tier ===
The 2008–09 Euroleague was the 9th season of the EuroLeague, under the Euroleague Basketball Company's authority, and it was the 52nd installment of the European top-tier level professional club competition for basketball clubs, running from October 23, 2008 to May 3, 2009. The trophy was won by Panathinaikos, who defeated the title holder CSKA Moscow by a result of 73–71 at O2 World in Berlin, Germany. Overall, Olympiacos achieved in present competition a record of 14 wins against 8 defeats, in five successive rounds. More detailed:

==== Regular season ====
- Day 1 (October 23, 2008)

Team 1	Score	Team 2
Air Avellino (Italy)	69–83	(Greece) Olympiacos

- Day 2 (October 30, 2008)

Team 1	Score	Team 2
Olympiacos (Greece)	82–72	(Spain) Unicaja

- Day 3 (November 6, 2008)

Team 1	Score	Team 2
Cibona VIP (Croatia)	85–76	(Greece) Olympiacos

- Day 4 (November 13, 2008)

Team 1	Score	Team 2
Olympiacos (Greece)	84–65	(Israel) Maccabi Tel Aviv

- Day 5 (November 27, 2008)

Team 1	Score	Team 2
Le Mans Sarthe (France)	93–98*	(Greece) Olympiacos

^{*}Overtime at the end of regulation (87–87).

- Day 6 (December 3, 2008)

Team 1	Score	Team 2
Olympiacos (Greece)	91–66	(Italy) Air Avellino

- Day 7 (December 10, 2008)

Team 1	Score	Team 2
Unicaja (Spain)	60–56	(Greece) Olympiacos

- Day 8 (December 17, 2008)

Team 1	Score	Team 2
Olympiacos (Greece)	93–64	(Croatia) Cibona VIP

- Day 9 (January 8, 2009)

Team 1	Score	Team 2
Maccabi Tel Aviv (Israel)	96–83	(Greece) Olympiacos

- Day 10 (January 15, 2009)

Team 1	Score	Team 2
Olympiacos (Greece)	68–78	(France) Le Mans Sarthe

- Group A standings:

Pos.	Team	Pld.	W	L	PF	PA	PD	Tie-break
1.	(Spain) Unicaja	10	8	2	771	698	+73	
2.	(Greece) Olympiacos	10	6	4	815	748	+67	1–1 (+6)
3.	(Israel) Maccabi Tel Aviv	10	6	4	815	811	+4	1–1 (-6)
4.	(Croatia) Cibona VIP	10	5	5	760	772	-12	
5.	(Italy) Air Avellino	10	3	7	754	814	-60	
6.	(France) Le Mans Sarthe	10	2	8	747	819	-72	

==== Top 16 ====
- Day 1 (January 29, 2009)

Team 1	Score	Team 2
Armani Jeans Milano (Italy)	76–74	(Greece) Olympiacos

- Day 2 (February 5, 2009)

Team 1	Score	Team 2
Olympiacos (Greece)	73–70	(Spain) Tau Cerámica

- Day 3 (February 11, 2009)

Team 1	Score	Team 2
Asseco Prokom (Poland)	68–93	(Greece) Olympiacos

- Day 4 (February 26, 2009)

Team 1	Score	Team 2
Olympiacos (Greece)	84–71	(Poland) Asseco Prokom

- Day 5 (March 5, 2009)

Team 1	Score	Team 2
Olympiacos (Greece)	84–81	(Italy) Armani Jeans Milano

- Day 6 (March 12, 2009)

Team 1	Score	Team 2
Tau Cerámica (Spain)	80–88	(Greece) Olympiacos

- Group E standings:

Pos.	Team	Pld.	W	L	PF	PA	PD
1.	(Greece) Olympiacos	6	5	1	496	446	+50
2.	(Spain) Tau Cerámica	6	4	2	556	474	+82
3.	(Italy) Armani Jeans Milano	6	2	4	455	529	-74
4.	(Poland) Asseco Prokom	6	1	5	444	502	-58

==== Quarterfinals ====
- Best-of-5 playoff: Game 1 at home on March 24, 2009 / Game 2 at home on March 26, 2009 / Game 3 away on March 31, 2009 / Game 4 away on April 2, 2009.

Team 1	Agg.	Team 2	1st leg	2nd leg	3rd leg	4th leg	5th leg
Olympiacos (Greece)	3–1	(Spain) Real Madrid	88–79	79–73	63–71	78–75	– – –

==== Final four ====
The 2009 Euroleague Final Four, was the 2008–09 season's Euroleague Final Four tournament, organized by Euroleague Basketball Company.

- Semifinals: May 1, 2009 at O2 World in Berlin, Germany.

Team 1	Score	Team 2
Olympiacos (Greece)	82–84	(Greece) Panathinaikos

- 3rd place game: May 3, 2009 at O2 World in Berlin, Germany.

Team 1	Score	Team 2
Olympiacos (Greece)	79–95	(Spain) Regal FC Barcelona

- Final four standings:

Pos.	Team	Rec.
	(Greece) Panathinaikos	2–0
Silver medal	(Russia) CSKA Moscow	1–1
Bronze medal	(Spain) Regal FC Barcelona	1–1
4th	(Greece) Olympiacos	0–2

== 2010s ==
=== 2009–10 Euroleague, 1st–tier ===
The 2009–10 Euroleague was the 10th season of the EuroLeague, under the Euroleague Basketball Company's authority, and it was the 53rd installment of the European top-tier level professional club competition for basketball clubs, running from September 29, 2009 to May 9, 2010. The trophy was won by Regal FC Barcelona, who defeated Olympiacos by a result of 86–68 at Palais Omnisports de Paris-Bercy in Paris, France. Overall, Olympiacos achieved in present competition a record of 17 wins against 5 defeats, in five successive rounds. More detailed:

==== Regular season ====
- Day 1 (October 21, 2009)

Team 1	Score	Team 2
Olympiacos (Greece)	94–72	(France) Entente Orléanaise

- Day 2 (October 28, 2009)

Team 1	Score	Team 2
Unicaja (Spain)	86–68	(Greece) Olympiacos

- Day 3 (November 4, 2009)

Team 1	Score	Team 2
Olympiacos (Greece)	97–73	(Lithuania) Lietuvos rytas

- Day 4 (November 12, 2009)

Team 1	Score	Team 2
Olympiacos (Greece)	105–90	(Turkey) Efes Pilsen

- Day 5 (November 26, 2009)

Team 1	Score	Team 2
Partizan (Serbia)	86–80	(Greece) Olympiacos

- Day 6 (December 2, 2009)

Team 1	Score	Team 2
Entente Orléanaise (France)	84–88	(Greece) Olympiacos

- Day 7 (December 10, 2009)

Team 1	Score	Team 2
Olympiacos (Greece)	89–68	(Spain) Unicaja

- Day 8 (December 16, 2009)

Team 1	Score	Team 2
Lietuvos rytas (Lithuania)	83–89*	(Greece) Olympiacos

^{*}Overtime at the end of regulation (74–74).

- Day 9 (January 7, 2010)

Team 1	Score	Team 2
Efes Pilsen (Turkey)	85–93*	(Greece) Olympiacos

^{*}Overtime at the end of regulation (76–76).

- Day 10 (January 13, 2010)

Team 1	Score	Team 2
Olympiacos (Greece)	81–60	(Serbia) Partizan

- Group B standings:

Pos.	Team	Pld.	W	L	PF	PA	PD	Tie-break
1.	(Greece) Olympiacos	10	8	2	884	787	+97	
2.	(Spain) Unicaja	10	7	3	784	775	+9	
3.	(Serbia) Partizan	10	5	5	745	757	-12	
4.	(Turkey) Efes Pilsen	10	4	6	808	793	+15	1–1 (+8)
5.	(Lithuania) Lietuvos rytas	10	4	6	741	784	-43	1–1 (-8)
6.	(France) Entente Orléanaise	10	2	8	722	788	-66	

==== Top 16 ====
- Day 1 (January 28, 2010)

Team 1	Score	Team 2
Caja Laboral (Spain)	85–89	(Greece) Olympiacos

- Day 2 (February 3, 2010)

Team 1	Score	Team 2
Olympiacos (Greece)	87–69	(Russia) Khimki

- Day 3 (February 10, 2010)

Team 1	Score	Team 2
Olympiacos (Greece)	78–75	(Croatia) Cibona VIP

- Day 4 (February 24, 2010)

Team 1	Score	Team 2
Cibona VIP (Croatia)	94–97	(Greece) Olympiacos

- Day 5 (March 4, 2010)

Team 1	Score	Team 2
Olympiacos (Greece)	102–85	(Spain) Caja Laboral

- Day 6 (March 11, 2010)

Team 1	Score	Team 2
Khimki (Russia)	96–83	(Greece) Olympiacos

- Group H standings:

Pos.	Team	Pld.	W	L	PF	PA	PD	Tie-break
1.	(Greece) Olympiacos	6	5	1	536	504	+32	
2.	(Spain) Caja Laboral	6	3	3	515	521	-6	1–1 (0)
3.	(Russia) Khimki	6	3	3	476	487	-11	1–1 (0)
4.	(Croatia) Cibona VIP	6	1	5	486	501	-15	

==== Quarterfinals ====
- Best-of-5 playoff: Game 1 at home on March 23, 2010 / Game 2 at home on March 25, 2010 / Game 3 away on March 30, 2010 / Game 4 away on April 1, 2010.

Team 1	Agg.	Team 2	1st leg	2nd leg	3rd leg	4th leg	5th leg
Olympiacos (Greece)	3–1	(Poland) Asseco Prokom	83–79	90–73	78–81	86–70	– – –

==== Final four ====
The 2010 Euroleague Final Four, was the 2009–10 season's Euroleague Final Four tournament, organized by Euroleague Basketball Company.

- Semifinals: May 7, 2010 at Palais Omnisports de Paris-Bercy in Paris, France.

Team 1	Score	Team 2
Partizan (Serbia)	80–83*	(Greece) Olympiacos

^{*}Overtime at the end of regulation (67–67).

- Final: May 9, 2010 at Palais Omnisports de Paris-Bercy in Paris, France.

Team 1	Score	Team 2
Regal FC Barcelona (Spain)	86–68	(Greece) Olympiacos

- Final four standings:

Pos.	Team	Rec.
	(Spain) Regal FC Barcelona	2–0
Silver medal	(Greece) Olympiacos	1–1
Bronze medal	(Russia) CSKA Moscow	1–1
4th	(Serbia) Partizan	0–2

=== 2010–11 Turkish Airlines Euroleague, 1st–tier ===
The 2010–11 Turkish Airlines Euroleague was the 11th season of the EuroLeague, under the Euroleague Basketball Company's authority, and it was the 54th installment of the European top-tier level professional club competition for basketball clubs, running from September 21, 2010 to May 8, 2011. The trophy was won by Panathinaikos, who defeated Maccabi Tel Aviv by a result of 78–70 at Palau Sant Jordi, in Barcelona, Spain. Overall, Olympiacos achieved in present competition a record of 13 wins against 7 defeats, in three successive rounds. More detailed:

==== Regular season ====
- Day 1 (October 18, 2010)

Team 1	Score	Team 2
Olympiacos (Greece)	82–66	(Spain) Real Madrid

- Day 2 (October 27, 2010)

Team 1	Score	Team 2
Brose Baskets (Germany)	73–61	(Greece) Olympiacos

- Day 3 (November 3, 2010)

Team 1	Score	Team 2
Olympiacos (Greece)	93–66	(Spain) Unicaja

- Day 4 (November 10, 2010)

Team 1	Score	Team 2
Olympiacos (Greece)	86–78	(Belgium) Spirou Charleroi

- Day 5 (November 17, 2010)

Team 1	Score	Team 2
Lottomatica Roma (Italy)	71–86	(Greece) Olympiacos

- Day 6 (November 25, 2010)

Team 1	Score	Team 2
Real Madrid (Spain)	82–68	(Greece) Olympiacos

- Day 7 (December 2, 2010)

Team 1	Score	Team 2
Olympiacos (Greece)	86–69	(Germany) Brose Baskets

- Day 8 (December 9, 2010)

Team 1	Score	Team 2
Unicaja (Spain)	76–74	(Greece) Olympiacos

- Day 9 (December 13, 2010)

Team 1	Score	Team 2
Spirou Charleroi (Belgium)	67–80	(Greece) Olympiacos

- Day 10 (December 23, 2010)

Team 1	Score	Team 2
Olympiacos (Greece)	89–82	(Italy) Lottomatica Roma

- Group B standings:

Pos.	Team	Pld.	W	L	PF	PA	PD	Tie-break
1.	(Greece) Olympiacos	10	7	3	805	730	+75	
2.	(Spain) Real Madrid	10	6	4	734	662	+72	
3.	(Spain) Unicaja	10	5	5	749	759	-10	1–1 (+15)
4.	(Italy) Lottomatica Roma	10	5	5	733	770	-37	1–1 (-15)
5.	(Germany) Brose Baskets	10	4	6	714	739	-25	
6.	(Belgium) Spirou Charleroi	10	3	7	691	766	-75	

==== Top 16 ====
- Day 1 (January 20, 2011)

Team 1	Score	Team 2
Olympiacos (Greece)	70–84	(Turkey) Fenerbahçe Ülker

- Day 2 (January 26, 2011)

Team 1	Score	Team 2
Žalgiris (Lithuania)	64–71	(Greece) Olympiacos

- Day 3 (February 2, 2011)

Team 1	Score	Team 2
Olympiacos (Greece)	77–62	(Spain) Power Electronics Valencia

- Day 4 (February 17, 2011)

Team 1	Score	Team 2
Power Electronics Valencia (Spain)	79–85	(Greece) Olympiacos

- Day 5 (February 24, 2011)

Team 1	Score	Team 2
Fenerbahçe Ülker (Turkey)	65–80	(Greece) Olympiacos

- Day 6 (March 3, 2011)

Team 1	Score	Team 2
Olympiacos (Greece)	78–64	(Lithuania) Žalgiris

- Group H standings:

Pos.	Team	Pld.	W	L	PF	PA	PD	Tie-break
1.	(Greece) Olympiacos	6	5	1	461	418	+43	
2.	(Spain) Power Electronics Valencia	6	3	3	449	438	+11	1–1 (+12)
3.	(Turkey) Fenerbahçe Ülker	6	3	3	456	462	-6	1–1 (-12)
4.	(Lithuania) Žalgiris	6	1	5	418	466	-48	

==== Quarterfinals ====
- Best-of-5 playoff: Game 1 at home on March 22, 2011 / Game 2 at home on March 24, 2011 / Game 3 away on March 29, 2011 / Game 4 away on March 31, 2011.

Team 1	Agg.	Team 2	1st leg	2nd leg	3rd leg	4th leg	5th leg
Olympiacos (Greece)	1–3	(Italy) Montepaschi Siena	89–41	65–82	72–81	76–88	– – –

=== 2011–12 Turkish Airlines Euroleague, 1st–tier ===
The 2011–12 Turkish Airlines Euroleague was the 12th season of the EuroLeague, under the Euroleague Basketball Company's authority, and it was the 55th installment of the European top-tier level professional club competition for basketball clubs, running from September 29, 2011 to May 13, 2012. The trophy was won by Olympiacos, who defeated CSKA Moscow by a result of 62–61 at Sinan Erdem Dome, in Istanbul, Turkey. Overall, Olympiacos achieved in present competition a record of 14 wins against 8 defeats, in five successive rounds. More detailed:

==== Regular season ====
- Day 1 (October 21, 2011)

Team 1	Score	Team 2
Bizkaia Bilbao Basket (Spain)	76–61	(Greece) Olympiacos

- Day 2 (October 27, 2011)

Team 1	Score	Team 2
Olympiacos (Greece)	81–74	(Turkey) Fenerbahçe Ülker

- Day 3 (November 2, 2011)

Team 1	Score	Team 2
Caja Laboral (Spain)	81–79	(Greece) Olympiacos

- Day 4 (November 9, 2011)

Team 1	Score	Team 2
Bennet Cantù (Italy)	64–63	(Greece) Olympiacos

- Day 5 (November 16, 2011)

Team 1	Score	Team 2
Olympiacos (Greece)	91–78	(France) SLUC Nancy

- Day 6 (November 23, 2011)

Team 1	Score	Team 2
Olympiacos (Greece)	88–81	(Spain) Gescrap Bizkaia Bilbao Basket

^{Note} On 14-11-2011, Bilbao Basket adopted a second nominal sponsor (Gescrap), and from that moment on the team was called Gescrap Bizkaia Bilbao Basket.

- Day 7 (December 1, 2011)

Team 1	Score	Team 2
Fenerbahçe Ülker (Turkey)	86–70	(Greece) Olympiacos

- Day 8 (December 8, 2011)

Team 1	Score	Team 2
Olympiacos (Greece)	84–82	(Spain) Caja Laboral

- Day 9 (December 15, 2011)

Team 1	Score	Team 2
Olympiacos (Greece)	86–61	(Italy) Bennet Cantù

- Day 10 (December 22, 2011)

Team 1	Score	Team 2
SLUC Nancy (France)	74–79	(Greece) Olympiacos

- Group A standings:

Pos.	Team	Pld.	W	L	PF	PA	PD	Tie-break
1.	(Turkey) Fenerbahçe Ülker	10	6	4	785	758	+27	1–1 (+9)
2.	(Greece) Olympiacos	10	6	4	782	757	+25	1–1 (-9)
3.	(Italy) Bennet Cantù	10	5	5	724	744	-20	3–1
4.	(Spain) Gescrap Bizkaia Bilbao Bask.	10	5	5	776	755	+21	2–2
5.	(Spain) Caja Laboral	10	5	5	792	755	+37	1–3
6.	(France) SLUC Nancy	10	3	7	743	833	-90	

==== Top 16 ====
- Day 1 (January 18, 2012)

Team 1	Score	Team 2
Olympiacos (Greece)	78–86	(Russia) CSKA Moscow

- Day 2 (January 26, 2016)

Team 1	Score	Team 2
Galatasaray Medical Park (Turkey)	78–77*	(Greece) Olympiacos

^{*}Overtime at the end of regulation (69–69).

- Day 3 (February 1, 2012)

Team 1	Score	Team 2
Olympiacos (Greece)	83–65	(Turkey) Anadolu Efes

- Day 4 (February 8, 2012)

Team 1	Score	Team 2
Anadolu Efes (Turkey)	65–67	(Greece) Olympiacos

- Day 5 (February 22, 2012)

Team 1	Score	Team 2
CSKA Moscow (Russia)	96–64	(Greece) Olympiacos

- Day 6 (March 1, 2012)

Team 1	Score	Team 2
Olympiacos (Greece)	88–81	(Turkey) Galatasaray Medical Park

- Group E standings:

Pos.	Team	Pld.	W	L	PF	PA	PD	Tie-break
1.	(Russia) CSKA Moscow	6	5	1	509	413	+96	
2.	(Greece) Olympiacos	6	3	3	457	471	-14	1–1 (+6)
3.	(Turkey) Galatasaray Medical Park	6	3	3	423	438	-15	1–1 (-6)
4.	(Turkey) Anadolu Efes	6	1	5	387	454	-67	

==== Quarterfinals ====
- Best-of-5 playoff: Game 1 at home on March 21, 2012 / Game 2 at home on March 23, 2012 / Game 3 away on March 28, 2012 / Game 4 away on March 30, 2012.

Team 1	Agg.	Team 2	1st leg	2nd leg	3rd leg	4th leg	5th leg
Montepaschi Siena (Italy)	1–3	(Greece) Olympiacos	75–82	81–80	55–75	69–76	– – –

==== Final four ====
The 2012 Euroleague Final Four, was the 2011–12 season's Euroleague Final Four tournament, organized by Euroleague Basketball Company.

- Semifinals: May 11, 2012 at Sinan Erdem Dome, in Istanbul, Turkey.

Team 1	Score	Team 2
Olympiacos (Greece)	68–64	(Spain) FC Barcelona Regal

- Final: May 13, 2012 at Sinan Erdem Dome, in Istanbul, Turkey.

Team 1	Score	Team 2
CSKA Moscow (Russia)	61–62	(Greece) Olympiacos

- Final four standings:

Pos.	Team	Rec.
	(Greece) Olympiacos	2–0
Silver medal	(Russia) CSKA Moscow	1–1
Bronze medal	(Spain) FC Barcelona Regal	1–1
4th	(Greece) Panathinaikos	0–2

=== 2012–13 Turkish Airlines Euroleague, 1st–tier ===
The 2012–13 Turkish Airlines Euroleague was the 13th season of the EuroLeague, under the Euroleague Basketball Company's authority, and it was the 56th installment of the European top-tier level professional club competition for basketball clubs, running from September 25, 2012 to May 12, 2013. The trophy was won by the title holder Olympiacos, who defeated Real Madrid by a result of 100–88 at The O2 Arena in London, United Kingdom. Overall, Olympiacos achieved in present competition a record of 22 wins against 9 defeats, in five successive rounds. More detailed:

==== Regular season ====
- Day 1 (October 11, 2012)

Team 1	Score	Team 2
Olympiacos (Greece)	85–81	(Spain) Caja Laboral

- Day 2 (October 19, 2012)

Team 1	Score	Team 2
Anadolu Efes (Turkey)	98–72	(Greece) Olympiacos

- Day 3 (October 25, 2012)

Team 1	Score	Team 2
Olympiacos (Greece)	61–79	(Lithuania) Žalgiris

- Day 4 (November 2, 2012)

Team 1	Score	Team 2
Olympiacos (Greece)	79–77	(Croatia) Cedevita

- Day 5 (November 8, 2012)

Team 1	Score	Team 2
EA7 Emporio Armani Milano (Italy)	71–84	(Greece) Olympiacos

- Day 6 (November 16, 2012)

Team 1	Score	Team 2
Caja Laboral (Spain)	72–89	(Greece) Olympiacos

- Day 7 (November 22, 2012)

Team 1	Score	Team 2
Olympiacos (Greece)	75–53	(Turkey) Anadolu Efes

- Day 8 (November 30, 2012)

Team 1	Score	Team 2
Žalgiris (Lithuania)	63–77	(Greece) Olympiacos

- Day 9 (December 6, 2012)

Team 1	Score	Team 2
Cedevita (Croatia)	62–84	(Greece) Olympiacos

- Day 10 (December 14, 2012)

Team 1	Score	Team 2
Olympiacos (Greece)	82–81	(Italy) EA7 Emporio Armani Milano

- Group C standings:

Pos.	Team	Pld.	W	L	PF	PA	PD	Tie-break
1.	(Lithuania) Žalgiris	10	8	2	804	693	+111	1–1 (+4)
2.	(Greece) Olympiacos	10	8	2	788	737	+51	1–1 (-4)
3.	(Turkey) Anadolu Efes	10	5	5	738	740	-2	
4.	(Spain) Caja Laboral	10	4	6	749	778	+21	
5.	(Italy) EA7 Emporio Armani Milano	10	3	7	760	767	-7	
6.	(Croatia) Cedevita	10	2	8	725	849	-124	

==== Top 16 ====
- Day 1 (December 27, 2012)

Team 1	Score	Team 2
Caja Laboral (Spain)	82–74	(Greece) Olympiacos

- Day 2 (January 4, 2013)

Team 1	Score	Team 2
Olympiacos (Greece)	77–64	(Turkey) Beşiktaş

- Day 3 (January 11, 2013)

Team 1	Score	Team 2
FC Barcelona Regal (Spain)	76–68	(Greece) Olympiacos

- Day 4 (January 18, 2013)

Team 1	Score	Team 2
Olympiacos (Greece)	72–74	(Italy) Montepaschi Siena

- Day 5 (January 24, 2013)

Team 1	Score	Team 2
Maccabi Tel Aviv (Israel)	77–78	(Greece) Olympiacos

- Day 6 (January 31, 2013)

Team 1	Score	Team 2
Olympiacos (Greece)	82–71	(Turkey) Fenerbahçe Ülker

- Day 7 (February 15, 2013)

Team 1	Score	Team 2
Khimki (Russia)	82–87	(Greece) Olympiacos

- Day 8 (February 22, 2013)

Team 1	Score	Team 2
Olympiacos (Greece)	82–74	(Spain) Caja Laboral

- Day 9 (February 28, 2013)

Team 1	Score	Team 2
Beşiktaş (Turkey)	60–79	(Greece) Olympiacos

- Day 10 (March 7, 2013)

Team 1	Score	Team 2
Olympiacos (Greece)	77–90	(Spain) FC Barcelona Regal

- Day 11 (March 14, 2013)

Team 1	Score	Team 2
Montepaschi Siena (Italy)	67–68	(Greece) Olympiacos

- Day 12 (March 22, 2013)

Team 1	Score	Team 2
Olympiacos (Greece)	67–73	(Israel) Maccabi Tel Aviv

- Day 13 (March 29, 2013)

Team 1	Score	Team 2
Fenerbahçe Ülker (Turkey)	73–78	(Greece) Olympiacos

- Day 14 (April 4, 2013)

Team 1	Score	Team 2
Olympiacos (Greece)	79–70	(Russia) Khimki

- Group A standings:

Pos.	Team	Pld.	W	L	PF	PA	PD	Tie-break
1.	(Spain) FC Barcelona Regal	14	13	1	1151	986	+165	
2.	(Greece) Olympiacos	14	9	5	1068	1033	+35	
3.	(Israel) Maccabi Tel Aviv	14	8	6	1105	1012	+93	1–1 (+3)
4.	(Spain) Caja Laboral	14	8	6	1093	1045	+48	1–1 (-3)
5.	(Russia) Khimki	14	7	7	1133	1051	+82	1–1 (+1)
6.	(Italy) Montepaschi Siena	14	7	7	1036	1057	-21	1–1 (-1)
7.	(Turkey) Beşiktaş	14	2	12	893	1104	-211	1–1 (+1)
8.	(Turkey) Fenerbahçe Ülker	14	2	12	1055	1246	-191	1–1 (-1)

==== Quarterfinals ====
- Best-of-5 playoff: Game 1 at home on March 10, 2013 / Game 2 at home on March 12, 2013 / Game 3 away on March 17, 2013 / Game 4 away on March 19, 2013 / Game 5 at home on March 26, 2013.

Team 1	Agg.	Team 2	1st leg	2nd leg	3rd leg	4th leg	5th leg
Olympiacos (Greece)	3–2	(Turkey) Anadolu Efes	67–62	71–53	72–83	73–74	82–72

==== Final four ====
The 2013 Euroleague Final Four, was the 2012–13 season's Euroleague Final Four tournament, organized by Euroleague Basketball Company.

- Semifinals: May 10, 2013 at The O2 Arena in London, United Kingdom.

Team 1	Score	Team 2
CSKA Moscow (Russia)	52–69	(Greece) Olympiacos

- Final: May 12, 2013 at The O2 Arena in London, United Kingdom.

Team 1	Score	Team 2
Olympiacos (Greece)	100–88	(Spain) Real Madrid

- Final four standings:

Pos.	Team	Rec.
	(Greece) Olympiacos	2–0
Silver medal	(Spain) Real Madrid	1–1
Bronze medal	(Russia) CSKA Moscow	1–1
4th	(Spain) FC Barcelona Regal	0–2

=== 2013–14 Turkish Airlines Euroleague, 1st–tier ===
The 2013–14 Turkish Airlines Euroleague was the 14th season of the EuroLeague, under the Euroleague Basketball Company's authority, and it was the 57th installment of the European top-tier level professional club competition for basketball clubs, running from October 1, 2013 to May 18, 2014. The trophy was won by Maccabi Tel Aviv, who defeated Real Madrid by a result of 98–86 at Mediolanum Forum in Milan, Italy. Overall, Olympiacos achieved in present competition a record of 20 wins against 9 defeats, in three successive rounds. More detailed:

==== Regular season ====
- Day 1 (October 18, 2013)

Team 1	Score	Team 2
Olympiacos (Greece)	69–61	(Spain) Unicaja

- Day 2 (October 24, 2013)

Team 1	Score	Team 2
Galatasaray Liv Hospital (Turkey)	67–78	(Greece) Olympiacos

- Day 3 (October 31, 2013)

Team 1	Score	Team 2
Olympiacos (Greece)	88–83	(Germany) Bayern Munich

- Day 4 (November 8, 2013)

Team 1	Score	Team 2
Montepaschi Siena (Italy)	62–70	(Greece) Olympiacos

- Day 5 (November 15, 2013)

Team 1	Score	Team 2
Olympiacos (Greece)	79–77	(Poland) Stelmet Zielona Góra

- Day 6 (November 22, 2013)

Team 1	Score	Team 2
Unicaja (Spain)	74–82	(Greece) Olympiacos

- Day 7 (November 28, 2013)

Team 1	Score	Team 2
Olympiacos (Greece)	72–54	(Turkey) Galatasaray Liv Hospital

- Day 8 (December 5, 2013)

Team 1	Score	Team 2
Bayern Munich (Germany)	103–105	(Greece) Olympiacos

- Day 9 (December 12, 2013)

Team 1	Score	Team 2
Olympiacos (Greece)	78–73	(Italy) Montepaschi Siena

- Day 10 (December 19, 2013)

Team 1	Score	Team 2
Stelmet Zielona Góra (Poland)	80–91	(Greece) Olympiacos

- Group C standings:

Pos.	Team	Pld.	W	L	PF	PA	PD
1.	(Greece) Olympiacos	10	10	0	812	734	+78
2.	(Turkey) Galatasaray Liv Hospital	10	6	4	700	725	-25
3.	(Spain) Unicaja	10	5	5	756	712	+44
4.	(Germany) Bayern Munich	10	4	6	818	791	+27
5.	(Italy) Montepaschi Siena	10	3	7	674	706	-32
6.	(Poland) Stelmet Zielona Góra	10	2	8	707	799	-92

==== Top 16 ====
- Day 1 (January 3, 2014)

Team 1	Score	Team 2
Olympiacos (Greece)	95–82	(Turkey) Fenerbahçe Ülker

- Day 2 (January 9, 2014)

Team 1	Score	Team 2
EA7 Emporio Armani Milano (Italy)	81–51	(Greece) Olympiacos

- Day 3 (January 16, 2014)

Team 1	Score	Team 2
Olympiacos (Greece)	72–81	(Spain) FC Barcelona

- Day 4 (January 24, 2014)

Team 1	Score	Team 2
Laboral Kutxa (Spain)	72–89	(Greece) Olympiacos

- Day 5 (January 30, 2014)

Team 1	Score	Team 2
Olympiacos (Greece)	73–55	(Spain) Unicaja

- Day 6 (February 13, 2014)

Team 1	Score	Team 2
Olympiacos (Greece)	78–60	(Turkey) Anadolu Efes

- Day 7 (February 20, 2014)

Team 1	Score	Team 2
Panathinaikos (Greece)	66–62	(Greece) Olympiacos

- Day 8 (February 28, 2014)

Team 1	Score	Team 2
Fenerbahçe Ülker (Turkey)	78–74	(Greece) Olympiacos

- Day 9 (March 6, 2014)

Team 1	Score	Team 2
Olympiacos (Greece)	86–88	(Italy) EA7 Emporio Armani Milano

- Day 10 (March 14, 2014)

Team 1	Score	Team 2
FC Barcelona (Spain)	70–58	(Greece) Olympiacos

- Day 11 (March 21, 2014)

Team 1	Score	Team 2
Olympiacos (Greece)	89–59	(Spain) Laboral Kutxa

- Day 12 (March 27, 2014)

Team 1	Score	Team 2
Unicaja (Spain)	63–80	(Greece) Olympiacos

- Day 13 (April 4, 2014)

Team 1	Score	Team 2
Anadolu Efes (Turkey)	78–83	(Greece) Olympiacos

- Day 14 (April 10, 2014)

Team 1	Score	Team 2
Olympiacos (Greece)	68–65	(Greece) Panathinaikos

- Group E standings:

Pos.	Team	Pld.	W	L	PF	PA	PD	Tie-break
1.	(Spain) FC Barcelona	14	12	2	1109	1009	+100	
2.	(Italy) EA7 Emporio Armani Milano	14	10	4	1093	1011	+83	
3.	(Greece) Olympiacos	14	8	6	1058	996	+62	
4.	(Greece) Panathinaikos	14	7	7	961	958	+3	
5.	(Spain) Unicaja	14	6	8	1032	1063	-31	1–1 (+12)
6.	(Turkey) Fenerbahçe Ülker	14	6	8	1078	1101	-23	1–1 (-12)
7.	(Spain) Laboral Kutxa	14	5	9	1061	1125	-64	
8.	(Turkey) Anadolu Efes	14	2	12	967	1096	-129	

==== Quarterfinals ====
- Best-of-5 playoff: Game 1 away on April 15, 2014 / Game 2 away on April 17, 2014 / Game 3 at home on April 21, 2014 / Game 4 at home on April 23, 2014 / Game 5 away on April 25, 2014.

Team 1	Agg.	Team 2	1st leg	2nd leg	3rd leg	4th leg	5th leg
Real Madrid (Spain)	3–2	(Greece) Olympiacos	88–71	82–77	76–78	62–71	83–69

=== 2014–15 Turkish Airlines Euroleague, 1st–tier ===
The 2014–15 Turkish Airlines Euroleague was the 15th season of the EuroLeague, under the Euroleague Basketball Company's authority, and it was the 58th installment of the European top-tier level professional club competition for basketball clubs, running from September 23, 2014 to May 17, 2015. The trophy was won by Real Madrid, who defeated Olympiacos by a result of 78–59 at Barclaycard Center in Madrid, Spain. Overall, Olympiacos achieved in present competition a record of 22 wins against 8 defeats, in five successive rounds. More detailed:

==== Regular season ====
- Day 1 (October 16, 2014)

Team 1	Score	Team 2
Valencia Basket (Spain)	68–71	(Greece) Olympiacos

- Day 2 (October 24, 2014)

Team 1	Score	Team 2
Olympiacos (Greece)	63–57	(Spain) Laboral Kutxa

- Day 3 (October 31, 2014)

Team 1	Score	Team 2
Neptūnas (Lithuania)	81–85*	(Greece) Olympiacos

^{*}Overtime at the end of regulation (76–76).

- Day 4 (November 7, 2014)

Team 1	Score	Team 2
Crvena zvezda Telekom (Serbia)	57–62	(Greece) Olympiacos

- Day 5 (November 13, 2014)

Team 1	Score	Team 2
Olympiacos (Greece)	93–66	(Turkey) Galatasaray Liv Hospital

- Day 6 (November 20, 2014)

Team 1	Score	Team 2
Olympiacos (Greece)	77–76	(Spain) Valencia Basket

- Day 7 (November 27, 2014)

Team 1	Score	Team 2
Laboral Kutxa (Spain)	89–70	(Greece) Olympiacos

- Day 8 (December 5, 2014)

Team 1	Score	Team 2
Olympiacos (Greece)	89–79	(Lithuania) Neptūnas

- Day 9 (December 12, 2014)

Team 1	Score	Team 2
Olympiacos (Greece)	64–59	(Serbia) Crvena zvezda Telekom

- Day 10 (December 18, 2014)

Team 1	Score	Team 2
Galatasaray Liv Hospital (Turkey)	79–74	(Greece) Olympiacos

- Group D standings:

Pos.	Team	Pld.	W	L	PF	PA	PD	Tie-break
1.	(Greece) Olympiacos	10	8	2	748	711	+37	
2.	(Serbia) Crvena zvezda Telekom	10	6	4	784	728	+56	
3.	(Spain) Laboral Kutxa	10	5	5	803	798	+5	
4.	(Turkey) Galatasaray Liv Hospital	10	4	6	803	818	-15	1–1 (+16)
5.	(Lithuania) Neptūnas	10	4	6	763	857	-94	1–1 (-16)
6.	(Spain) Valencia Basket	10	3	7	775	764	+11	

==== Top 16 ====
- Day 1 (January 2, 2015)

Team 1	Score	Team 2
Unicaja (Spain)	61–69	(Greece) Olympiacos

- Day 2 (January 8, 2015)

Team 1	Score	Team 2
Olympiacos (Greece)	81–58	(Italy) EA7 Emporio Armani Milano

- Day 3 (January 16, 2015)

Team 1	Score	Team 2
Fenerbahçe Ülker (Turkey)	68–74	(Greece) Olympiacos

- Day 4 (January 23, 2015)

Team 1	Score	Team 2
Olympiacos (Greece)	76–64	(Spain) Laboral Kutxa

- Day 5 (January 29, 2015)

Team 1	Score	Team 2
Anadolu Efes (Turkey)	84–70	(Greece) Olympiacos

- Day 6 (February 5, 2015)

Team 1	Score	Team 2
Olympiacos (Greece)	84–76	(Russia) CSKA Moscow

- Day 7 (February 12, 2015)

Team 1	Score	Team 2
Nizhny Novgorod (Russia)	82–91	(Greece) Olympiacos

- Day 8 (February 27, 2015)

Team 1	Score	Team 2
Olympiacos (Greece)	77–72	(Spain) Unicaja

- Day 9 (March 6, 2015)

Team 1	Score	Team 2
EA7 Emporio Armani Milano (Italy)	74–83	(Greece) Olympiacos

- Day 10 (March 13, 2015)

Team 1	Score	Team 2
Olympiacos (Greece)	64–73	(Turkey) Fenerbahçe Ülker

- Day 11 (March 20, 2015)

Team 1	Score	Team 2
Laboral Kutxa (Spain)	74–73	(Greece) Olympiacos

- Day 12 (March 26, 2015)

Team 1	Score	Team 2
Olympiacos (Greece)	86–75	(Turkey) Anadolu Efes

- Day 13 (April 3, 2015)

Team 1	Score	Team 2
CSKA Moscow (Russia)	76–70	(Greece) Olympiacos

- Day 14 (April 10, 2015)

Team 1	Score	Team 2
Olympiacos (Greece)	77–70	(Russia) Nizhny Novgorod

- Group F standings:

Pos.	Team	Pld.	W	L	PF	PA	PD	Tie-break
1.	(Russia) CSKA Moscow	14	12	2	1227	1114	+113	
2.	(Turkey) Fenerbahçe Ülker	14	11	3	1126	1033	+93	
3.	(Greece) Olympiacos	14	10	4	1075	1007	+68	
4.	(Turkey) Anadolu Efes	14	6	8	1102	1132	-30	1–1 (+2)
5.	(Spain) Laboral Kutxa	14	6	8	1155	1164	-3	1–1 (-2)
6.	(Italy) EA7 Emporio Armani Milano	14	4	10	1083	1193	-110	2–0
7.	(Spain) Unicaja	14	4	10	1079	1140	-61	0–2
8.	(Russia) Nizhny Novgorod	14	3	11	1121	1185	-64	

==== Quarterfinals ====
- Best-of-5 playoff: Game 1 away on April 15, 2015 / Game 2 away on April 17, 2015 / Game 3 at home on April 21, 2015 / Game 4 at home on April 23, 2015.

Team 1	Agg.	Team 2	1st leg	2nd leg	3rd leg	4th leg	5th leg
FC Barcelona (Spain)	1–3	(Greece) Olympiacos	73–57	63–76	71–73	68–71	– – –

==== Final four ====
The 2015 Euroleague Final Four, was the 2014–15 season's Euroleague Final Four tournament, organized by Euroleague Basketball Company.

- Semifinals: May 15, 2015 at Barclaycard Center in Madrid, Spain.

Team 1	Score	Team 2
CSKA Moscow (Russia)	68–70	(Greece) Olympiacos

- Final: May 17, 2015 at Barclaycard Center in Madrid, Spain.

Team 1	Score	Team 2
Real Madrid (Spain)	78–59	(Greece) Olympiacos

- Final four standings:

Pos.	Team	Rec.
	(Spain) Real Madrid	2–0
Silver medal	(Greece) Olympiacos	1–1
Bronze medal	(Russia) CSKA Moscow	1–1
4th	(Turkey) Fenerbahçe Ülker	0–2

=== 2015–16 Turkish Airlines Euroleague, 1st–tier ===
The 2015–16 Turkish Airlines Euroleague was the 16th season of the EuroLeague, under the Euroleague Basketball Company's authority, and it was the 59th installment of the European top-tier level professional club competition for basketball clubs, running from October 15, 2015 to May 15, 2016. The trophy was won by CSKA Moscow, who defeated Fenerbahçe by a result of 101–96 (OT) at Mercedes-Benz Arena in Berlin, Germany. Overall, Olympiacos achieved in present competition a record of 14 wins against 10 defeats, in two successive rounds. More detailed:

==== Regular season ====
- Day 1 (October 15, 2015)

Team 1	Score	Team 2
Olympiacos (Greece)	76–61	(Croatia) Cedevita

- Day 2 (October 23, 2015)

Team 1	Score	Team 2
Laboral Kutxa (Spain)	96–89*	(Greece) Olympiacos

^{*}Overtime at the end of regulation (80–80).

- Day 3 (October 30, 2015)

Team 1	Score	Team 2
EA7 Emporio Armani Milan (Italy)	66–71	(Greece) Olympiacos

- Day 4 (November 5, 2015)

Team 1	Score	Team 2
Olympiacos (Greece)	75–49	(France) Limoges CSP

- Day 5 (November 12, 2015)

Team 1	Score	Team 2
Anadolu Efes (Turkey)	87–91*	(Greece) Olympiacos

^{*}Overtime at the end of regulation (76–76).

- Day 6 (November 19, 2015)

Team 1	Score	Team 2
Cedevita (Croatia)	70–83	(Greece) Olympiacos

- Day 7 (November 26, 2015)

Team 1	Score	Team 2
Olympiacos (Greece)	59–52	(Spain) Laboral Kutxa

- Day 8 (December 3, 2015)

Team 1	Score	Team 2
Olympiacos (Greece)	73–63	(Italy) EA7 Emporio Armani Milan

- Day 9 (December 10, 2015)

Team 1	Score	Team 2
Limoges CSP (France)	67–76	(Greece) Olympiacos

- Day 10 (December 18, 2015)

Team 1	Score	Team 2
Olympiacos (Greece)	68–81	(Turkey) Anadolu Efes

- Group B standings:

Pos.	Team	Pld.	W	L	PF	PA	PD	Tie-break
1.	(Greece) Olympiacos	10	8	2	761	692	+69	
2.	(Turkey) Anadolu Efes	10	6	4	863	805	+58	1–1 (+7)
3.	(Spain) Laboral Kutxa	10	6	4	854	766	+88	1–1 (-7)
4.	(Croatia) Cedevita	10	4	6	750	780	-30	
5.	(France) Limoges CSP	10	3	7	698	823	-125	2–0
6.	(Italy) EA7 Emporio Armani Milan	10	3	7	737	797	-60	0–2

==== Top 16 ====
- Day 1 (December 29, 2015)

Team 1	Score	Team 2
Olympiacos (Greece)	74–62	(Spain) FC Barcelona Lassa

- Day 2 (January 7, 2016)

Team 1	Score	Team 2
Laboral Kutxa (Spain)	76–82	(Greece) Olympiacos

- Day 3 (January 15, 2016)

Team 1	Score	Team 2
Olympiacos (Greece)	72–77	(Germany) Brose Baskets

- Day 4 (January 22, 2016)

Team 1	Score	Team 2
Žalgiris (Lithuania)	75–55	(Greece) Olympiacos

- Day 5 (January 28, 2016)

Team 1	Score	Team 2
Real Madrid (Spain)	84–72	(Greece) Olympiacos

- Day 6 (February 5, 2016)

Team 1	Score	Team 2
Olympiacos (Greece)	89–77	(Russia) Khimki

- Day 7 (February 12, 2016)

Team 1	Score	Team 2
CSKA Moscow (Russia)	92–85	(Greece) Olympiacos

- Day 8 (February 26, 2016)

Team 1	Score	Team 2
FC Barcelona Lassa (Spain)	82–66	(Greece) Olympiacos

- Day 9 (March 4, 2016)

Team 1	Score	Team 2
Olympiacos (Greece)	82–68	(Spain) Laboral Kutxa

- Day 10 (March 10, 2016)

Team 1	Score	Team 2
Brose Baskets (Germany)	72–71	(Greece) Olympiacos

- Day 11 (March 18, 2016)

Team 1	Score	Team 2
Olympiacos (Greece)	74–59	(Lithuania) Žalgiris

- Day 12 (March 25, 2016)

Team 1	Score	Team 2
Olympiacos (Greece)	99–84	(Spain) Real Madrid

- Day 13 (March 31, 2016)

Team 1	Score	Team 2
Khimki (Russia)	98–66	(Greece) Olympiacos

- Day 14 (April 8, 2016)

Team 1	Score	Team 2
Olympiacos (Greece)	96–99	(Russia) CSKA Moscow

- Group F standings:

Pos.	Team	Pld.	W	L	PF	PA	PD	Tie-break
1.	(Russia) CSKA Moscow	14	10	4	1299	1185	+114	
2.	(Spain) Laboral Kutxa	14	9	5	1110	1075	+35	
3.	(Spain) FC Barcelona Lassa	14	8	6	1085	1059	+26	
4.	(Spain) Real Madrid	14	7	7	1173	1165	+8	4–0
5.	(Russia) Khimki	14	7	7	1164	1138	+26	1–3 (+12)
6.	(Germany) Brose Baskets	14	7	7	1073	1088	-15	1–3 (-12)
7.	(Greece) Olympiacos	14	6	8	1083	1105	-22	
8.	(Lithuania) Žalgiris	14	2	12	1007	1179	-172	

=== 2016–17 Turkish Airlines EuroLeague, 1st–tier ===
The 2016–17 Turkish Airlines EuroLeague was the 17th season of the EuroLeague, under the Euroleague Basketball Company's authority, and it was the 60th installment of the European top-tier level professional club competition for basketball clubs, running from October 12, 2016 to May 21, 2017. The trophy was won by Fenerbahçe, who defeated Olympiacos by a result of 80–64 at Sinan Erdem Dome, in Istanbul, Turkey. Overall, Olympiacos achieved in present competition a record of 23 wins against 14 defeats, in four successive rounds. More detailed:

==== Regular season ====
- Day 1 (October 12, 2016)

Team 1	Score	Team 2
Real Madrid (Spain)	83–65	(Greece) Olympiacos

^{Note} Opening EuroLeague game.

- Day 2 (October 20, 2016)

Team 1	Score	Team 2
Olympiacos (Greece)	90–66	(Turkey) Anadolu Efes

- Day 3 (October 25, 2016)

Team 1	Score	Team 2
Olympiacos (Greece)	91–81	(Italy) EA7 Emporio Armani Milan

- Day 4 (October 27, 2016)

Team 1	Score	Team 2
Baskonia (Spain)	90–95	(Greece) Olympiacos

- Day 5 (November 3, 2016)

Team 1	Score	Team 2
Olympiacos (Greece)	75–81	(Russia) CSKA Moscow

- Day 6 (November 11, 2016)

Team 1	Score	Team 2
Galatasaray Odeabank (Turkey)	89–87	(Greece) Olympiacos

- Day 7 (November 16, 2016)

Team 1	Score	Team 2
Olympiacos (Greece)	59–52	(Spain) FC Barcelona Lassa

- Day 8 (November 18, 2016)

Team 1	Score	Team 2
Panathinaikos Superfoods (Greece)	77–79	(Greece) Olympiacos

- Day 9 (November 24, 2016)

Team 1	Score	Team 2
Olympiacos (Greece)	73–80	(Israel) Maccabi Tel Aviv

- Day 10 (December 2, 2016)

Team 1	Score	Team 2
Darüşşafaka Doğuş (Turkey)	71–77	(Greece) Olympiacos

- Day 11 (December 9, 2016)

Team 1	Score	Team 2
Olympiacos (Greece)	88–59	(Russia) UNICS

- Day 12 (December 15, 2016)

Team 1	Score	Team 2
Žalgiris (Lithuania)	75–88	(Greece) Olympiacos

- Day 13 (December 20, 2016)

Team 1	Score	Team 2
Olympiacos (Greece)	73–65	(Serbia) Crvena zvezda mts

- Day 14 (December 22, 2016)

Team 1	Score	Team 2
Brose Bamberg (Germany)	82–68	(Greece) Olympiacos

- Day 15 (December 29, 2016)

Team 1	Score	Team 2
Olympiacos (Greece)	71–62	(Turkey) Fenerbahçe

- Day 16 (January 6, 2017)

Team 1	Score	Team 2
Olympiacos (Greece)	77–69	(Greece) Panathinaikos Superfoods

- Day 17 (January 12, 2017)

Team 1	Score	Team 2
FC Barcelona Lassa (Spain)	67–69	(Greece) Olympiacos

- Day 18 (January 20, 2017)

Team 1	Score	Team 2
Olympiacos (Greece)	92–62	(Spain) Baskonia

- Day 19 (January 25, 2017)

Team 1	Score	Team 2
EA7 Emporio Armani Milan (Italy)	99–83	(Greece) Olympiacos

- Day 20 (January 27, 2017)

Team 1	Score	Team 2
Olympiacos (Greece)	83–77	(Germany) Brose Bamberg

- Day 21 (February 2, 2017)

Team 1	Score	Team 2
UNICS (Russia)	75–90	(Greece) Olympiacos

- Day 22 (February 10, 2017)

Team 1	Score	Team 2
Olympiacos (Greece)	73–64	(Lithuania) Žalgiris

- Day 23 (February 23, 2017)

Team 1	Score	Team 2
Fenerbahçe (Turkey)	67–64	(Greece) Olympiacos

- Day 24 (March 2, 2017)

Team 1	Score	Team 2
Maccabi Tel Aviv (Israel)	71–82	(Greece) Olympiacos

- Day 25 (March 10, 2017)

Team 1	Score	Team 2
Olympiacos (Greece)	81–73	(Turkey) Darüşşafaka Doğuş

- Day 26 (March 17, 2017)

Team 1	Score	Team 2
Olympiacos (Greece)	71–80	(Turkey) Galatasaray Odeabank

- Day 27 (March 22, 2017)

Team 1	Score	Team 2
Crvena zvezda mts (Serbia)	64–66*	(Greece) Olympiacos

^{*}Overtime at the end of regulation (58–58).

- Day 28 (March 24, 2017)

Team 1	Score	Team 2
Olympiacos (Greece)	73–79	(Spain) Real Madrid

- Day 29 (March 30, 2017)

Team 1	Score	Team 2
Anadolu Efes (Turkey)	77–69	(Greece) Olympiacos

- Day 30 (April 7, 2017)

Team 1	Score	Team 2
CSKA Moscow (Russia)	90–86	(Greece) Olympiacos

- Regular season standings:

Pos.	Team	Pld.	W	L	PF	PA	PD	Tie-break
1.	(Spain) Real Madrid	30	23	7	2585	2353	+232	
2.	(Russia) CSKA Moscow	30	22	8	2608	2355	+253	
3.	(Greece) Olympiacos	30	19	11	2330	2221	+109	2–0
4.	(Greece) Panathinaikos Superfoods	30	19	11	2263	2187	+76	0–2
5.	(Turkey) Fenerbahçe	30	18	12	2256	2233	+23	
6.	(Turkey) Anadolu Efes	30	17	13	2472	2467	+5	1–1 (+10)
7.	(Spain) Baskonia	30	17	13	2445	2376	+69	1–1 (-10)
8.	(Turkey) Darüşşafaka Doğuş	30	16	14	2358	2353	+5	2–0
9.	(Serbia) Crvena zvezda mts	30	16	14	2203	2196	+7	0–2
10.	(Lithuania) Žalgiris	30	14	16	2350	2391	-41	
11.	(Spain) FC Barcelona Lassa	30	12	18	2134	2232	-98	
12.	(Turkey) Galatasaray Odeabank	30	11	19	2345	2475	-130	
13.	(Germany) Brose Bamberg	30	10	20	2369	2404	-35	2–0
14.	(Israel) Maccabi Tel Aviv	30	10	20	2333	2493	-160	0–2
15.	(Russia) UNICS	30	8	22	2288	2408	-120	2–0
16.	(Italy) EA7 Emporio Armani Milan	30	8	22	2411	2606	-195	0–2

Rules for classification: All points scored in extra period(s) were not counted in the standings, nor for any tie-break situation.

==== Quarterfinals ====
- Best-of-5 playoff: Game 1 at home on April 19, 2017 / Game 2 at home on April 21, 2017 / Game 3 away on April 26, 2017 / Game 4 away on April 28, 2017 / Game 5 at home on May 2, 2017.

Team 1	Agg.	Team 2	1st leg	2nd leg	3rd leg	4th leg	5th leg
Olympiacos (Greece)	3–2	(Turkey) Anadolu Efes	87–72	71–73	60–64	74–62	87–78

==== Final four ====
The 2017 EuroLeague Final Four, was the 2016–17 season's EuroLeague Final Four tournament, organized by Euroleague Basketball Company.

- Semifinals: May 19, 2017 at Sinan Erdem Dome, in Istanbul, Turkey.

Team 1	Score	Team 2
CSKA Moscow (Russia)	78–82	(Greece) Olympiacos

- Final: May 21, 2017 at Sinan Erdem Dome, in Istanbul, Turkey.

Team 1	Score	Team 2
Fenerbahçe (Turkey)	80–64	(Greece) Olympiacos

- Final four standings:

Pos.	Team	Rec.
	(Turkey) Fenerbahçe	2–0
Silver medal	(Greece) Olympiacos	1–1
Bronze medal	(Russia) CSKA Moscow	1–1
4th	(Spain) Real Madrid	0–2

=== 2017–18 Turkish Airlines EuroLeague, 1st–tier ===
The 2017–18 Turkish Airlines EuroLeague was the 18th season of the EuroLeague, under the Euroleague Basketball Company's authority, and it was the 61st installment of the European top-tier level professional club competition for basketball clubs, running from October 12, 2017 to May 20, 2018. The trophy was won by Real Madrid, who defeated the title holder Fenerbahçe Doğuş by a result of 85–80 at Štark Arena in Belgrade, Serbia. Overall, Olympiacos achieved in present competition a record of 20 wins against 14 defeats, in two successive rounds. More detailed:

==== Regular season ====
- Day 1 (October 12, 2017)

Team 1	Score	Team 2
Olympiacos (Greece)	75–64	(Spain) Baskonia

- Day 2 (October 20, 2017)

Team 1	Score	Team 2
Olympiacos (Greece)	80–75	(Spain) Unicaja

- Day 3 (October 24, 2017)

Team 1	Score	Team 2
Maccabi Tel Aviv (Israel)	68–69	(Greece) Olympiacos

- Day 4 (October 26, 2017)

Team 1	Score	Team 2
Olympiacos (Greece)	92–75	(Russia) Khimki

- Day 5 (November 3, 2017)

Team 1	Score	Team 2
FC Barcelona Lassa (Spain)	73–51	(Greece) Olympiacos

- Day 6 (November 10, 2017)

Team 1	Score	Team 2
Olympiacos (Greece)	62–70	(Greece) Panathinaikos Superfoods

- Day 7 (November 15, 2017)

Team 1	Score	Team 2
Fenerbahçe Doğuş (Turkey)	83–90*	(Greece) Olympiacos

^{*}Overtime at the end of regulation (75–75).

- Day 8 (November 17, 2017)

Team 1	Score	Team 2
Olympiacos (Greece)	85–59	(Serbia) Crvena zvezda mts

- Day 9 (November 23, 2017)

Team 1	Score	Team 2
A|X Armani Exchange Olimpia (Italy)	85–86	(Greece) Olympiacos

- Day 10 (November 30, 2017)

Team 1	Score	Team 2
Valencia Basket (Spain)	64–72	(Greece) Olympiacos

- Day 11 (December 8, 2017)

Team 1	Score	Team 2
Olympiacos (Greece)	92–83*	(Spain) Real Madrid

^{*}Overtime at the end of regulation (72–72).

- Day 12 (December 14, 2017)

Team 1	Score	Team 2
Brose Bamberg (Germany)	67–65	(Greece) Olympiacos

- Day 13 (December 20, 2017)

Team 1	Score	Team 2
Olympiacos (Greece)	88–86	(Russia) CSKA Moscow

- Day 14 (December 22, 2017)

Team 1	Score	Team 2
Anadolu Efes (Turkey)	58–61	(Greece) Olympiacos

- Day 15 (December 28, 2017)

Team 1	Score	Team 2
Žalgiris (Lithuania)	74–68	(Greece) Olympiacos

- Day 16 (January 5, 2018)

Team 1	Score	Team 2
Olympiacos (Greece)	87–80	(Italy) A|X Armani Exchange Olimpia

- Day 17 (January 12, 2018)

Team 1	Score	Team 2
Baskonia (Spain)	86–54	(Greece) Olympiacos

- Day 18 (January 16, 2018)

Team 1	Score	Team 2
Olympiacos (Greece)	94–64	(Israel) Maccabi Tel Aviv

- Day 19 (January 18, 2018)

Team 1	Score	Team 2
Khimki (Russia)	82–54	(Greece) Olympiacos

- Day 20 (January 26, 2018)

Team 1	Score	Team 2
Crvena zvezda mts (Serbia)	89–78	(Greece) Olympiacos

- Day 21 (February 1, 2018)

Team 1	Score	Team 2
Olympiacos (Greece)	95–70	(Turkey) Fenerbahçe Doğuş

- Day 22 (February 9, 2018)

Team 1	Score	Team 2
Real Madrid (Spain)	79–80	(Greece) Olympiacos

- Day 23 (February 22, 2018)

Team 1	Score	Team 2
Olympiacos (Greece)	80–70	(Spain) Valencia Basket

- Day 24 (March 2, 2018)

Team 1	Score	Team 2
Panathinaikos Superfoods (Greece)	85–87*	(Greece) Olympiacos

^{*}Overtime at the end of regulation (71–71).

- Day 25 (March 9, 2018)

Team 1	Score	Team 2
Olympiacos (Greece)	87–79	(Germany) Brose Bamberg

- Day 26 (March 15, 2018)

Team 1	Score	Team 2
Olympiacos (Greece)	63–90	(Spain) FC Barcelona Lassa

- Day 27 (March 21, 2018)

Team 1	Score	Team 2
CSKA Moscow (Russia)	89–81	(Greece) Olympiacos

- Day 28 (March 23, 2018)

Team 1	Score	Team 2
Olympiacos (Greece)	89–82	(Turkey) Anadolu Efes

- Day 29 (March 30, 2018)

Team 1	Score	Team 2
Unicaja (Spain)	87–85*	(Greece) Olympiacos

^{*}Overtime at the end of regulation (74–74).

- Day 30 (April 6, 2018)

Team 1	Score	Team 2
Olympiacos (Greece)	85–86*	(Lithuania) Žalgiris

^{*}Overtime at the end of regulation (80–80).

- Regular season standings:

Pos.	Team	Pld.	W	L	PF	PA	PD	Tie-break
1.	(Russia) CSKA Moscow	30	24	6	2675	2377	+298	
2.	(Turkey) Fenerbahçe Doğuş	30	21	9	2381	2208	+173	
3.	(Greece) Olympiacos	30	19	11	2268	2250	+18	3–1
4.	(Greece) Panathinaikos Superfoods	30	19	11	2334	2291	+43	2–2
5.	(Spain) Real Madrid	30	19	11	2576	2375	+201	1–3
6.	(Lithuania) Žalgiris	30	18	12	2417	2389	+28	
7.	(Spain) Baskonia**	30	16	14	2487	2373	+114	1–1 (+9)
8.	(Russia) Khimki	30	16	14	2338	2352	-14	1–1 (-9)
9.	(Spain) Unicaja	30	13	17	2347	2435	-88	2–0
10.	(Israel) Maccabi Tel Aviv	30	13	17	2440	2530	-90	0–2
11.	(Spain) Valencia Basket	30	12	18	2336	2420	-84	
12.	(Germany) Brose Bamberg	30	11	19	2309	2446	-137	3–1
13.	(Spain) FC Barcelona Lassa	30	11	19	2456	2404	+52	2–2
14.	(Serbia) Crvena zvezda mts	30	11	19	2333	2515	-182	1–3
15.	(Italy) A|X Armani Exchange Olimpia	30	10	20	2407	2530	-123	
16.	(Turkey) Anadolu Efes	30	7	23	2321	2530	-209	

^{**} On 11-4-2018, Baskonia adopted a nominal sponsor (Kirolbet), and from that moment on the team was called Kirolbet Baskonia.

Rules for classification: All points scored in extra period(s) were not counted in the standings, nor for any tie-break situation.

==== Quarterfinals ====
- Best-of-5 playoff: Game 1 at home on April 18, 2018 / Game 2 at home on April 20, 2018 / Game 3 away on April 24, 2018 / Game 4 away on April 26, 2018.

Team 1	Agg.	Team 2	1st leg	2nd leg	3rd leg	4th leg	5th leg
Olympiacos (Greece)	1–3	(Lithuania) Žalgiris	78–87	79–68	60–80	91–101	– – –

=== 2018–19 Turkish Airlines EuroLeague, 1st–tier ===
The 2018–19 Turkish Airlines EuroLeague was the 19th season of the EuroLeague, under the Euroleague Basketball Company's authority, and it was the 62nd installment of the European top-tier level professional club competition for basketball clubs, running from October 12, 2018 to May 19, 2019. The trophy was won by CSKA Moscow, who defeated Anadolu Efes by a result of 91–83 at Fernando Buesa Arena in Vitoria-Gasteiz, Spain. Overall, Olympiacos achieved in present competition a record of 15 wins against 15 defeats, in only one round. More detailed:

==== Regular season ====
- Day 1 (October 12, 2018)

Team 1	Score	Team 2
Khimki (Russia)	66–87	(Greece) Olympiacos

- Day 2 (October 17, 2018)

Team 1	Score	Team 2
Kirolbet Baskonia (Spain)	80–85	(Greece) Olympiacos

- Day 3 (October 19, 2018)

Team 1	Score	Team 2
Olympiacos (Greece)	75–99	(Italy) A|X Armani Exchange Olimpia

- Day 4 (October 25, 2018)

Team 1	Score	Team 2
Olympiacos (Greece)	88–80	(Israel) Maccabi Tel Aviv

- Day 5 (November 1, 2018)

Team 1	Score	Team 2
CSKA Moscow (Russia)	69–65	(Greece) Olympiacos

- Day 6 (November 9, 2018)

Team 1	Score	Team 2
Panathinaikos OPAP (Greece)	93–80	(Greece) Olympiacos

- Day 7 (November 15, 2018)

Team 1	Score	Team 2
Olympiacos (Greece)	72–73	(Turkey) Fenerbahçe Beko

- Day 8 (November 20, 2018)

Team 1	Score	Team 2
Bayern Munich (Germany)	62–72	(Greece) Olympiacos

- Day 9 (November 22, 2018)

Team 1	Score	Team 2
Olympiacos (Greece)	88–83	(Spain) Real Madrid

- Day 10 (November 30, 2018)

Team 1	Score	Team 2
Olympiacos (Greece)	92–70	(Montenegro) Budućnost VOLI

- Day 11 (December 6, 2018)

Team 1	Score	Team 2
Žalgiris (Lithuania)	83–75	(Greece) Olympiacos

- Day 12 (December 13, 2018)

Team 1	Score	Team 2
Olympiacos (Greece)	88–81	(Turkey) Anadolu Efes

- Day 13 (December 18, 2018)

Team 1	Score	Team 2
FC Barcelona Lassa (Spain)	60–69	(Greece) Olympiacos

- Day 14 (December 20, 2018)

Team 1	Score	Team 2
Olympiacos (Greece)	98–77	(Spain) Herbalife Gran Canaria

- Day 15 (December 27, 2018)

Team 1	Score	Team 2
Darüşşafaka Tekfen (Turkey)	79–75	(Greece) Olympiacos

- Day 16 (January 4, 2019)

Team 1	Score	Team 2
Olympiacos (Greece)	79–65	(Greece) Panathinaikos OPAP

- Day 17 (January 8, 2019)

Team 1	Score	Team 2
Olympiacos (Greece)	91–87*	(Spain) Kirolbet Baskonia

^{*}Overtime at the end of regulation (80–80).

- Day 18 (January 10, 2019)

Team 1	Score	Team 2
Real Madrid (Spain)	94–78	(Greece) Olympiacos

- Day 19 (January 17, 2019)

Team 1	Score	Team 2
Olympiacos (Greece)	71–57	(Russia) Khimki

- Day 20 (January 24, 2019)

Team 1	Score	Team 2
Fenerbahçe Beko (Turkey)	90–75	(Greece) Olympiacos

- Day 21 (January 31, 2019)

Team 1	Score	Team 2
Olympiacos (Greece)	55–76	(Spain) FC Barcelona Lassa

- Day 22 (February 7, 2019)

Team 1	Score	Team 2
Maccabi Tel Aviv (Israel)	65–64	(Greece) Olympiacos

- Day 23 (February 21, 2019)

Team 1	Score	Team 2
Anadolu Efes (Turkey)	75–65	(Greece) Olympiacos

- Day 24 (March 1, 2019)

Team 1	Score	Team 2
Olympiacos (Greece)	81–97	(Russia) CSKA Moscow

- Day 25 (March 8, 2019)

Team 1	Score	Team 2
Budućnost VOLI (Montenegro)	76–89	(Greece) Olympiacos

- Day 26 (March 14, 2019)

Team 1	Score	Team 2
A|X Armani Exchange Olimpia (Italy)	66–57	(Greece) Olympiacos

- Day 27 (March 19, 2019)

Team 1	Score	Team 2
Olympiacos (Greece)	89–69	(Germany) Bayern Munich

- Day 28 (March 21, 2019)

Team 1	Score	Team 2
Herbalife Gran Canaria (Spain)	90–67	(Greece) Olympiacos

- Day 29 (March 29, 2019)

Team 1	Score	Team 2
Olympiacos (Greece)	68–72	(Lithuania) Žalgiris

- Day 30 (April 5, 2019)

Team 1	Score	Team 2
Olympiacos (Greece)	99–74	(Turkey) Darüşşafaka Tekfen

- Regular season standings:

Pos.	Team	Pld.	W	L	PF	PA	PD	Tie-break
1.	(Turkey) Fenerbahçe Beko	30	25	5	2504	2237	+267	
2.	(Russia) CSKA Moscow	30	24	6	2590	2397	+193	
3.	(Spain) Real Madrid	30	22	8	2578	2342	+236	
4.	(Turkey) Anadolu Efes	30	20	10	2562	2406	+156	
5.	(Spain) FC Barcelona Lassa	30	18	12	2358	2282	+76	
6.	(Greece) Panathinaikos OPAP	30	16	14	2382	2345	+37	
7.	(Spain) Kirolbet Baskonia	30	15	15	2449	2378	+71	2–2 (+10)
8.	(Lithuania) Žalgiris	30	15	15	2360	2323	+37	2–2 (-3)
9.	(Greece) Olympiacos	30	15	15	2326	2301	+25	2–2 (-7)
10.	(Israel) Maccabi Tel Aviv	30	14	16	2376	2346	+30	3–1
11.	(Germany) Bayern Munich	30	14	16	2348	2404	-56	2–2
12.	(Italy) A|X Armani Exchange Olimpia	30	14	16	2601	2600	+1	1–3
13.	(Russia) Khimki	30	9	21	2333	2449	-116	
14.	(Spain) Herbalife Gran Canaria	30	8	22	2317	2616	-299	
15.	(Montenegro) Budućnost VOLI	30	6	24	2230	2550	-320	
16.	(Turkey) Darüşşafaka Tekfen	30	5	25	2238	2576	-338	

Rules for classification: All points scored in extra period(s) were not counted in the standings, nor for any tie-break situation.

== Worldwide and other prestigious (semi-official) European competitions ==
=== 1996 XXXII FIBA International Christmas Tournament ===
The 1996 XXXII FIBA International Christmas Tournament "Trofeo Raimundo Saporta-Memorial Fernando Martín" was the 32nd installment of the international men's professional basketball club tournament FIBA International Christmas Tournament, running from December 24, 1996 to December 26, 1996. It took place at Palacio de Deportes de la Comunidad de Madrid in Madrid, Spain and the trophy was won by Real Madrid Teka.

==== Round-robin tournament ====
- Day 1 (December 24, 1996)

Team 1	Score	Team 2
Olympiacos (Greece)	80–76	(Turkey) Efes Pilsen

- Day 2 (December 25, 1996)

Team 1	Score	Team 2
Olympiacos (Greece)	85–62	(Italy) Scavolini Pesaro

- Day 3 (December 26, 1996)

Team 1	Score	Team 2
Real Madrid Teka (Spain)	66–64	(Greece) Olympiacos

- Final standings:

Pos.	Team	Pld.	Pts.	W	L	PF	PA	PD
1.	(Spain) Real Madrid Teka	3	6	3	0	239	211	+28
2.	(Greece) Olympiacos	3	5	2	1	229	204	+25
3.	(Turkey) Efes Pilsen	3	4	1	2	231	233	-2
4.	(Italy) Scavolini Pesaro	3	3	0	3	207	258	-51

=== 1997 McDonald's Championship ===
The 1997 McDonald's Championship was the 8th installment of McDonald's Championship, running from October 16, 1997 to October 18, 1997. It took place at Palais Omnisports de Paris-Bercy in Paris, France and the trophy was son by Chicago Bulls, who defeated Olympiacos by a result of 104–78.

==== Preliminary round ====
- October 16, 1997 at Palais Omnisports de Paris-Bercy in Paris, France.

Bye

==== Semifinals ====
- October 17, 1997 at Palais Omnisports de Paris-Bercy in Paris, France.

Team 1	Score	Team 2
Olympiacos (Greece)	89–86	(Argentina) Atenas

==== Final ====
- October 18, 1997 at Palais Omnisports de Paris-Bercy in Paris, France.

Team 1	Score	Team 2
Olympiacos (Greece)	78–104	(United States) Chicago Bulls

==== Final standings ====
Pos.	Club	Rec.
	(United States) Chicago Bulls	2–0
Silver medal	(Greece) Olympiacos	1–1
Bronze medal	(Argentina) Atenas	2–1
4.	(France) PSG Racing	1–2
5.	(Italy) Benetton Treviso	1–1
6.	(Spain) FC Barcelona Banca Catalana	0–2

=== 2013 FIBA Intercontinental Cup ===
The 2013 FIBA Intercontinental Cup was the 23rd installment of the FIBA Intercontinental Cup for men's professional basketball clubs, running from October 4, 2013 to October 6, 2013. It took place at Ginásio José Corrêa arena in Barueri, São Paulo, Brazil and the trophy was won by Olympiacos, who defeated Pinheiros Sky by a result of 167–139 in a two-legged final.

==== Finals ====
- Tie played on October 4, 2013 and on October 6, 2013 at Ginásio José Corrêa in Barueri, São Paulo, Brazil.

Team 1	Agg.	Team 2	1st leg	2nd leg
Pinheiros Sky (Brazil)	139–167	(Greece) Olympiacos	70–81	69–86

== Notable seasons ==
Season	Achievement	Notes
EuroLeague
1978–79	Semi-final group stage	6th place in a group with Emerson Varese, Bosna Sarajevo, Maccabi Tel Aviv, Real Madrid and Joventut Badalona
1992–93	Quarter-finals	eliminated 2–1 by Limoges CSP: 70–67 (W) in Patras, 53–59 (L) and 58–60 (L) in Limoges
1993–94	Final (2nd)	defeated Panathinaikos Athens 77–72 in the semi-final, lost to Joventut Badalona 57–59 in the final of the 1994 Final Four in Tel Aviv
1994–95	Final (2nd)	defeated Panathinaikos Athens 58–52 in the semi-final, lost to Real Madrid 61–73 in the final of the 1995 Final Four in Zaragoza
1995–96	Quarter-finals	eliminated 2–1 by Real Madrid: 68–49 (W) in Piraeus, 77–80 (L) and 65–80 (L) in Madrid
1996–97	Champions (1st)	defeated Olimpija Ljubljana 74–65 in the semi-final, defeated FC Barcelona 73–58 in the final of the 1997 Final Four in Rome
1998–99	Final Four (3rd)	lost to Žalgiris Kaunas 71–87 in the semi-final, defeated Fortitudo Bologna 74–63 in the 3rd-place game of the 1999 Final Four in Munich
2000–01	Quarter-finals	eliminated 2–0 by Baskonia Vitoria-Gasteiz: 72–78 (L) in Piraeus, 76–98 (L) in Vitoria-Gasteiz
2005–06	Quarter-finals	eliminated 2–1 by Maccabi Tel Aviv: 78–87 (L) in Tel Aviv, 76–70 (W) in Piraeus, 73–77 (L) in Tel Aviv
2006–07	Quarter-finals	eliminated 2–0 by Baskonia Vitoria-Gasteiz: 59–84 (L) in Vitoria-Gasteiz, 89–95 (L) in Piraeus
2007–08	Quarter-finals	eliminated 2–1 by CSKA Moscow: 76–74 (W) in Moscow, 73–83 (L) in Piraeus, 56–81 (L) in Moscow
2008–09	Final Four (4th)	lost to Panathinaikos Athens 82–84 in the semi-final, lost to FC Barcelona 79–95 in the 3rd-place game of the 2009 Final Four in Berlin
2009–10	Final (2nd)	defeated Partizan Belgrade 83–80 in the semi-final, lost to FC Barcelona 68–86 in the final of the 2010 Final Four in Paris
2010–11	Quarter-finals	eliminated 3–1 by Mens Sana Siena: 89–41 (W) & 65–82 (L) in Piraeus, 72–81 (L) and 76–88 (L) in Siena
2011–12	Champions (1st)	defeated FC Barcelona 68–64 in the semi-final, defeated CSKA Moscow 62–61 in the final of the 2012 Final Four in Istanbul
2012–13	Champions (1st)	defeated CSKA Moscow 69–52 in the semi-final, defeated Real Madrid 100–88 in the final of the 2013 Final Four in London
2013–14	Quarter-finals	eliminated 3–2 by Real Madrid: 71–88 (L), 77–82 (L) in Madrid, 78–76 (W), 71–62 (W) in Piraeus and 69–83 (L) in Madrid
2014–15	Final (2nd)	defeated CSKA Moscow 70–68 in the semi-final, lost to Real Madrid 59–78 in the final of the 2015 Final Four in Madrid
2016–17	Final (2nd)	defeated CSKA Moscow 82–78 in the semi-final, lost to Fenerbahçe Istanbul 64–80 in the final of the 2017 Final Four in Istanbul
2017–18	Quarter-finals	eliminated 3–1 by Žalgiris Kaunas: 78–87 (L), 79–68 (W) in Piraeus, 60–80 (L) and 91–101 (L) in Kaunas
2021–22	Final Four (4th)	lost to Anadolu Efes Istanbul 74–77 in the semi-final, lost to FC Barcelona 74–84 in the 3rd-place game of the 2022 Final Four in Belgrade
2022–23	Final (2nd)	defeated AS Monaco 76–62 in the semi-final, lost to Real Madrid 78–79 in the final of the 2023 Final Four in Kaunas
2023–24	Final Four (3rd)	lost to Real Madrid 87–76 in the semi-final, defeated Fenerbahçe Istanbul 87–84 in the 3rd-place game of the 2024 Final Four in Berlin
FIBA Saporta Cup
1975–76	Quarter-finals	4th place in a group with Rabotnički Skopje, ASPO Tours and CSKA Sofia
FIBA Intercontinental Cup
2013	Intercontinental Champions	defeated Pinheiros Basquete, 81–70 (W) and 86–69 (W) in the double final of Intercontinental Cup in São Paulo
McDonald's Championship
1997	Final	defeated Atenas de Cordoba 89–86 in the semi-final, lost to Chicago Bulls 78–104 in the final (Paris)

== The biggest wins in European competitions ==
=== The biggest wins in FIBA Champions Cup and Euroleague ===
Home wins

Season	Match	Score	Pts dif.
1978–79	Olympiacos – Jalaa	106 – 57	+49
2010–11	Olympiacos – Montepaschi Siena	89 – 41	+48
2022–23	Olympiacos – Virtus Segafredo Bologna	117 – 71	+46
1993–94	Olympiacos – Guildford Kings	96 – 51	+45
2007–08	Olympiacos – Prokom Trefl Sopot	109 – 65	+44
2024–25	Olympiacos – Bayern Munich	112 – 69	+43
2021–22	Olympiacos – LDLC ASVEL	89 – 54	+35
2000–01	Olympiacos – Ovarense Aerosoles	101 – 67	+34
2000–01	Olympiacos – Hapoel Jerusalem	102 – 69	+33
2007–08	Olympiacos – Union Olimpija	113 – 80	+33
1994–95	Olympiacos – Cibona	101 – 69	+32
1996–97	Olympiacos – Estudiantes Argentaria	110 – 78	+32
2025–26	Olympiacos – Virtus Bologna	109 – 77	+32
1994–95	Olympiacos – 7up Joventut	84 – 53	+31
1996–97	Olympiacos – CSKA Moscow	82 – 51	+31
2013–14	Olympiacos – Laboral Kutxa	89 – 59	+30
2016–17	Olympiacos – Baskonia	92 – 62	+30
2017–18	Olympiacos – Maccabi Tel Aviv	94 – 64	+30
2025–26	Olympiacos – Monaco	94 – 64	+30
1998–99	Olympiacos – Alba Berlin	94 – 65	+29
2001–02	Olympiacos – Spirou Charleroi	107 – 78	+29
2005–06	Olympiacos – Cibona VIP	99 – 70	+29
2016–17	Olympiacos – UNICS	88 – 59	+29
2022–23	Olympiacos – Partizan Mozzart Bet	87 – 58	+29
1999–00	Olympiacos – Budućnost	89 – 61	+28
2007–08	Olympiacos – VidiVici Bologna	104 – 76	+28
2021–22	Olympiacos – Panathinaikos OPAP	101 – 73	+28
2022–23	Olympiacos – Bayern Munich	102 – 74	+28
1996–97	Olympiacos – Spirou Charleroi	87 – 60	+27
2006–07	Olympiacos – Climamio Bologna	94 – 67	+27
2010–11	Olympiacos – Unicaja	93 – 66	+27
2014–15	Olympiacos – Galatasaray Liv Hospital	93 – 66	+27
2022–23	Olympiacos – Fenerbahçe Beko	94 – 67	+27

Away wins

Season	Match	Score	Pts dif.
2000–01	Ovarense Aerosoles – Olympiacos	53 – 100	+47
2025–26	Partizan – Olympiacos	66 – 104	+38
1994–95	Efes Pilsen – Olympiacos	42 – 77	+35
2022–23	Alba Berlin – Olympiacos	60 – 93	+33
1997–98	FC Porto – Olympiacos	63 – 92	+29
2005–06	Žalgiris – Olympiacos	72 – 99	+27
2022–23	Panathinaikos – Olympiacos	71 – 95	+24
1999–00	Ülker – Olympiacos	64 – 86	+22
2012–13	Cedevita – Olympiacos	62 – 84	+22
2024–25	Virtus Segafredo Bologna – Olympiacos	70 – 92	+22
2018–19	Khimki – Olympiacos	66 – 87	+21
2021–22	A|X Armani Exchange Milan – Olympiacos	72 – 93	+21
1993–94	Guildford Kings – Olympiacos	51 – 71	+20
1996–97	Panathinaikos – Olympiacos	49 – 69	+20
2001–02	Spirou Charleroi – Olympiacos	56 – 76	+20
2022–23	Fenerbahçe Beko – Olympiacos	73 – 93	+20
1992–93	Maes Pils – Olympiacos	66 – 85	+19
2001–02	Alba Berlin – Olympiacos	69 – 88	+19
2002–03	Idea Śląsk – Olympiacos	72 – 91	+19
2012–13	Beşiktaş Integral Forex – Olympiacos	60 – 79	+19
2013–14	Laboral Kutxa – Olympiacos	70 – 89	+19
2019–20	Alba Berlin – Olympiacos	80 – 99	+19
2021–22	Panathinaikos OPAP – Olympiacos	65 – 84	+19
1978–79	Jalaa – Olympiacos	76 – 94	+18
1993–94	Bayer 04 Leverkusen – Olympiacos	53 – 70	+17
2002–03	Ülker – Olympiacos	65 – 82	+17
2012–13	Caja Laboral – Olympiacos	72 – 89	+17
2013–14	Unicaja – Olympiacos	63 – 80	+17
2020–21	Khimki – Olympiacos	88 – 105	+17
2024–25	Paris – Olympiacos	73 – 90	+17

=== The biggest wins in FIBA Saporta Cup ===
Season	Match	Score	Pts dif.
1972–73	Olympiacos – Raak Punch	107 – 77	+30
1975–76	Olympiacos – Soma Wien	77 – 49	+28
1975–76	Olympiacos – Hapoel Tel Aviv	89 – 63	+26

=== The biggest wins in FIBA Korać Cup ===
Season	Match	Score	Pts dif.
1979–80	Olympiacos – Tofaş	94 – 49	+45
1988–89	Górnik Wałbrzych – Olympiacos	55 – 98	+43
1988–89	Dinamo Tbilisi – Olympiacos	75 – 96	+21

== Record ==
Olympiacos has overall, from 1960–61 FIBA European Champions Cup (first participation) to 2018–19 Turkish Airlines EuroLeague (last participation): 404 wins against 278 defeats plus 1 draw in 683 games for all the European club competitions.

- FIBA European Champions Cup or FIBA European League or FIBA EuroLeague or EuroLeague, 1st–tier: 385–252 in 637 games.
- FIBA European Cup Winners' Cup, 2nd–tier: 10–13 (plus 1 draw) in 24 games.
- FIBA Korać Cup, 3rd–tier: 9–13 in 22 games.

== See also ==
- Greek basketball clubs in international competitions
