= List of FIBA Saporta Cup Finals top scorers =

The FIBA Saporta Cup Finals Top Scorer was the individual award for the player that was the highest points scorer of the FIBA Saporta Cup Finals. Which was the championship Finals of the European-wide second-tier level professional club basketball competition, the FIBA Saporta Cup.

== FIBA Saporta Cup Finals Top Scorers ==
From the 1966–67 season, to the 2001–02 season, the Top Scorer of the FIBA Saporta Cup Finals was noted, regardless of whether he played on the winning or losing team.

| * | Member of the Naismith Memorial Basketball Hall of Fame |
| ** | Member of the FIBA Hall of Fame |
| *** | Member of both the Naismith and FIBA Halls of Fame |

| Season | Top Scorer | Club | Points Scored |
|---|---|---|---|
| 1966–67 | (United States) (Israel) Tal Brody | (Israel) Maccabi Tel Aviv | 26.5 (2 games) |
| 1967–68 | (Greece) Georgios Amerikanos & (Czechoslovakia) Jiří Zídek Sr. | (Greece) AEK & (Czechoslovakia) Slavia VŠ Praha | 31 |
| 1968–69 | (Czechoslovakia) Jiří Zedníček | (Czechoslovakia) Slavia VŠ Praha | 22 |
| 1969–70 | (United States) Rudy Bennett | (France) JA Vichy | 26.0 (2 games) |
| 1970–71 | (Italy) Massimo Masini | (Italy) Simmenthal Milano | 18.5 (2 games) |
| 1971–72 | (United States) Art Kenney | (Italy) Simmenthal Milano | 23 |
| 1972–73 | (Soviet Union) Valery Fedorov | (Soviet Union) Spartak Leningrad | 25 |
| 1973–74 | (Socialist Federal Republic of Yugoslavia) Dragan Kapičić | (Socialist Federal Republic of Yugoslavia) Crvena zvezda | 23 |
| 1974–75 | (Socialist Federal Republic of Yugoslavia) Zoran Slavnić** | (Socialist Federal Republic of Yugoslavia) Crvena zvezda | 21 |
| 1975–76 | (Italy) Giuseppe "Pino" Brumatti | (Italy) Cinzano Milano | 29 |
| 1976–77 | (Socialist Federal Republic of Yugoslavia) Srećko Jarić | (Socialist Federal Republic of Yugoslavia) Radnički Belgrade | 30 |
| 1977–78 | (Italy) Gianni Bertolotti | (Italy) Sinudyne Bologna | 27 |
| 1978–79 | (United States) Johnny Neumann & (United States) Dave Batton | (Italy) Gabetti Cantù | 20 |
| 1979–80 | (United States) Bruce Seals | (Italy) Emerson Varese | 26 |
| 1980–81 | (Spain) Juan Antonio San Epifanio "Epi" | (Spain) FC Barcelona | 28 |
| 1981–82 | (Socialist Federal Republic of Yugoslavia) Andro Knego | (Socialist Federal Republic of Yugoslavia) Cibona | 34 |
| 1982–83 | (Socialist Federal Republic of Yugoslavia) Dragan Kićanović*** | (Italy) Scavolini Pesaro | 31 |
| 1983–84 | (United States) Brian Jackson & (Italy) Roberto Premier | (Spain) Real Madrid & (Italy) Simac Milano | 27 |
| 1984–85 | (Soviet Union) Rimas Kurtinaitis | (Soviet Union) Žalgiris | 36 |
| 1985–86 | (United States) Zam Fredrick | (Italy) Scavolini Pesaro | 32 |
| 1986–87 | (Socialist Federal Republic of Yugoslavia) Dražen Petrović*** | (Socialist Federal Republic of Yugoslavia) Cibona | 28 |
| 1987–88 | (United States) Don Collins | (France) Limoges CSP | 28 |
| 1988–89 | (Socialist Federal Republic of Yugoslavia) Dražen Petrović*** (2) | (Spain) Real Madrid | 62 |
| 1989–90 | (United States) Micheal Ray Richardson | (Italy) Knorr Bologna | 29 |
| 1990–91 | (Socialist Federal Republic of Yugoslavia) (Greece) Bane Prelević | (Greece) PAOK | 31 |
| 1991–92 | (Federal Republic of Yugoslavia) (Greece) Bane Prelević (2) | (Greece) PAOK | 29 |
| 1992–93 | (United States) Roy Tarpley | (Greece) Sato Aris | 19 |
| 1993–94 | (Slovenia) Roman Horvat | (Slovenia) Smelt Olimpija | 33 |
| 1994–95 | (North Macedonia) Petar Naumoski, (United States) Orlando Woolridge & (United States) Kenny Green | (Italy) Benetton Treviso & (Spain) Taugrés | 26 |
| 1995–96 | (Federal Republic of Yugoslavia) (Greece) Bane Prelević (3) | (Greece) PAOK | 34 |
| 1996–97 | (Spain) Alberto Herreros | (Spain) Real Madrid Teka | 19 |
| 1997–98 | (Lithuania) Saulius Štombergas | (Lithuania) Žalgiris | 35 |
| 1998–99 | (United States) Henry Williams & (United States) Rod Sellers | (Italy) Benetton Treviso & (Spain) Pamesa Valencia | 17 |
| 1999–00 | (Federal Republic of Yugoslavia) Sasha Danilović | (Italy) Kinder Bologna | 18 |
| 2000–01 | (United States) Jimmy Oliver | (Greece) Maroussi | 31 |
| 2001–02 | (North Macedonia) Petar Naumoski (2) | (Italy) Montepaschi Siena | 23 |

=== Multiple FIBA Saporta Cup Finals Top Scorers ===
| Number | Player |
|---|---|
| 3× | (Federal Republic of Yugoslavia) (Greece) Bane Prelević |
| 2× | (Socialist Federal Republic of Yugoslavia) Dražen Petrović |
| 2× | (North Macedonia) Petar Naumoski |

== Top 10 scoring performances in finals games ==
The 10 highest individual single-game scoring performances in FIBA Saporta Cup Finals games.

| Points Scored | Player | Club | Year | Opponent Club |
|---|---|---|---|---|
| 62 | (Socialist Federal Republic of Yugoslavia) Dražen Petrović | (Spain) Real Madrid | 1989 | (Italy) Snaidero Caserta |
| 44 | (Brazil) Oscar Schmidt | (Italy) Snaidero Caserta | 1989 | (Spain) Real Madrid |
| 36 | (Soviet Union) Rimas Kurtinaitis | (Soviet Union) Žalgiris | 1985 | (Spain) FC Barcelona |
| 35 | (Lithuania) Saulius Štombergas | (Lithuania) Žalgiris | 1998 | (Italy) Stefanel Milano |
| 34 | (Socialist Federal Republic of Yugoslavia) Andro Knego | (Socialist Federal Republic of Yugoslavia) Cibona | 1982 | (Spain) Real Madrid |
| 34 | (Italy) Nando Gentile | (Italy) Snaidero Caserta | 1989 | (Spain) Real Madrid |
| 34 | (Federal Republic of Yugoslavia) (Greece) Bane Prelević | (Greece) PAOK | 1996 | (Spain) Taugrés |
| 33 | (Slovenia) Roman Horvat | (Slovenia) Smelt Olimpija | 1994 | (Spain) Taugrés |
| 32 | (United States) Ken Bannister | (Spain) Taugrés | 1994 | (Slovenia) Smelt Olimpija |
| 32 | (United States) Zam Fredrick | (Italy) Scavolini Pesaro | 1986 | (Spain) FC Barcelona |

== See also ==
- EuroLeague Finals Top Scorer (1st tier level)
- FIBA Saporta Cup
- FIBA Saporta Cup Finals
- FIBA Saporta Cup Finals MVP
- FIBA Saporta Cup Top Scorer
- FIBA Saporta Cup Records
- FIBA Festivals
- FIBA EuroStars
