= FIBA Saporta Cup Top Scorer =

The FIBA Saporta Cup Top scorer, also known as the FIBA Saporta Cup Best Scorer, was an annual basketball award of the now defunct second-tier level European-wide league, the FIBA Saporta Cup. It was given to the Top scorer throughout the FIBA Saporta Cup season.

== FIBA Saporta Cup Top scorers (1992–2002) ==
- Only counting the FIBA Saporta Cup Top scorers, starting with the 1991–92 season onward.

Season	Position	Top scorer	Team	PPG	Ref.
1991–92	SG	(Federal Republic of Yugoslavia) (Greece) Bane Prelević	(Greece) PAOK	25.6	
1992–93	PF/C	(United States) Roy Tarpley	(Greece) Sato Aris	25.6	
1993–94	SG/SF	(Bulgaria) Georgi Mladenov	(Bulgaria) Levski Sofia	30.3	
1994–95	PF	(United States) Walter Berry	(Greece) Iraklis Aspis Pronoia	28.4	
1995–96	SG	(Poland) Igor Griszczuk	(Poland) Nobiles Włocławek	26.9	
1996–97	SG/SF	(Bulgaria) Georgi Mladenov (2)	(Bulgaria) Spartak Pleven	29.3	
1997–98	PG	(United States) (Poland) Eric Elliott	(Sweden) Plannja Basket Lulea	25.9	
1998–99	SF	(United States) Kenya Capers	(Austria) Oberwart Gunners	25.0	
1999–00	PF	(United States) (France) Mike Doyle	(Belgium) Okapi Maes Aalst	24.9	
2000–01	SG/SF	(Canada) (Jamaica) Rowan Barrett	(Cyprus) Keravnos	23.7	
2001–02	SG	(Greece) Georgios Diamantopoulos	(Greece) Panionios	22.6	

== Multiple FIBA Saporta Cup Top scorers (1992–2002) ==
Number	Player
2	(Bulgaria) Georgi Mladenov
1	10 Players

== See also ==
- FIBA Saporta Cup
- FIBA Saporta Cup Finals
- FIBA Saporta Cup Finals MVP
- FIBA Saporta Cup Finals Top Scorer
- FIBA Saporta Cup Records
- FIBA Festivals
- FIBA EuroStars
