= FIBA Saporta Cup records =

The FIBA Saporta Cup records are the records of the now defunct European-wide second-tier level professional club basketball competition, the FIBA Saporta Cup.

== Top 10 scoring performances in finals games ==
The 10 highest individual single-game scoring performances in FIBA Saporta Cup Finals games.

Points Scored	Player	Club	Year	Opponent Club	Ref.
62	(Socialist Federal Republic of Yugoslavia) Dražen Petrović	(Spain) Real Madrid	1989	(Italy) Snaidero Caserta	
44	(Brazil) Oscar Schmidt	(Italy) Snaidero Caserta	1989	(Spain) Real Madrid	
36	(Soviet Union) Rimas Kurtinaitis	(Soviet Union) Žalgiris	1985	(Spain) FC Barcelona	
35	(Lithuania) Saulius Štombergas	(Lithuania) Žalgiris	1998	(Italy) Stefanel Milano	
34	(Socialist Federal Republic of Yugoslavia) Andro Knego	(Socialist Federal Republic of Yugoslavia) Cibona	1982	(Spain) Real Madrid	
34	(Italy) Nando Gentile	(Italy) Snaidero Caserta	1989	(Spain) Real Madrid	
34	(Federal Republic of Yugoslavia) (Greece) Bane Prelević	(Greece) PAOK	1996	(Spain) Taugrés	
33	(Slovenia) Roman Horvat	(Slovenia) Smelt Olimpija	1994	(Spain) Taugrés	
32	(United States) Ken Bannister	(Spain) Taugrés	1994	(Slovenia) Smelt Olimpija	
32	(United States) Zam Fredrick	(Italy) Scavolini Pesaro	1986	(Spain) FC Barcelona	

== Medals (1966-2002) ==
Rank	Nation	Gold	Silver	Bronze	Total
1	Italy (ITA)	15	9	12	36
2	Spain (ESP)	7	9	13	29
3	Greece (GRE)	5	2	8	15
4	Serbia (SRB)	3	4	8	15
5	Russia (RUS)	2	3	10	15
6	France (FRA)	1	4	7	12
7	Czech Republic (CZE)	1	2	1	4
8	Lithuania (LTU)	1	0	2	3
9	Slovenia (SLO)	1	0	1	2
10	Israel (ISR)	0	1	2	3
10	Netherlands (NED)	0	1	2	3
12	Turkey (TUR)	0	1	0	1
13	Bulgaria (BUL)	0	0	2	2
13	Germany (GER)	0	0	2	2
15	Croatia (CRO)	0	0	1	1
15	Poland (POL)	0	0	1	1
Totals (16 entries)		36	36	72	144

1. Russia + Soviet Union
2. Serbia + Yugoslavia
3. Czech Republic + Czechoslovakia
4. Germany + East Germany

== Players with the most Saporta Cup championships ==
Players that won the most FIBA Saporta Cup championships.

Player	Saporta Cups	Years	Ref.
(Italy) Pierlo Marzorati	4	1977, 1978, 1979, 1981	
(Italy) Renzo Tombolato	4	1977, 1978, 1979, 1981	
(Italy) Umberto Cappelletti	4	1977, 1978, 1979, 1981	
(Italy) Renzo Bariviera	4	1971, 1972, 1979, 1981	

== Head coaches with multiple Saporta Cup championships ==
Head coaches that won multiple FIBA Saporta Cup championships.

Head coach	Saporta Cups	Years	Ref.
(Italy) Arnaldo Taurisano	3	1977, 1978, 1979	
(Italy) Cesare Rubini	2	1971, 1972	
(Soviet Union) Vladimir Kondrashin	2	1973, 1975	
(Spain) Lolo Sainz	2	1984, 1989	
(Federal Republic of Yugoslavia) Željko Obradović	2	1997, 1999	

== See also ==
- FIBA Saporta Cup
- FIBA Saporta Cup Finals
- FIBA Saporta Cup Finals MVP
- FIBA Saporta Cup Finals Top Scorer
- FIBA Saporta Cup Top Scorer
- FIBA Festivals
- FIBA EuroStars
