= FIBA Saporta Cup Finals =

The FIBA Saporta Cup Finals was the championship finals series of the now defunct FIBA Saporta Cup competition. FIBA Saporta Cup was the name of the European-wide second-tier level professional club basketball competition. It was the competition in which the domestic National Cup winners from all over Europe played against each other. The competition was organized by FIBA Europe. It was named after the late Raimundo Saporta, a former Real Madrid director.

== Title holders ==
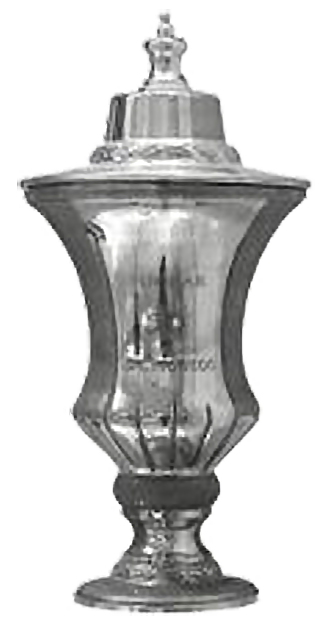

- 1966–67 (Italy) Ignis Varese
- 1967–68 (Greece) AEK
- 1968–69 (Czechoslovakia) Slavia VŠ Praha
- 1969–70 (Italy) Fides Napoli
- 1970–71 (Italy) Simmenthal Milano
- 1971–72 (Italy) Simmenthal Milano
- 1972–73 (Soviet Union) Spartak Leningrad
- 1973–74 (Socialist Federal Republic of Yugoslavia) Crvena zvezda
- 1974–75 (Soviet Union) Spartak Leningrad
- 1975–76 (Italy) Cinzano Milano
- 1976–77 (Italy) Birra Forst Cantù
- 1977–78 (Italy) Gabetti Cantù
- 1978–79 (Italy) Gabetti Cantù
- 1979–80 (Italy) Emerson Varese
- 1980–81 (Italy) Squibb Cantù
- 1981–82 (Socialist Federal Republic of Yugoslavia) Cibona
- 1982–83 (Italy) Scavolini Pesaro
- 1983–84 (Spain) Real Madrid
- 1984–85 (Spain) FC Barcelona
- 1985–86 (Spain) FC Barcelona
- 1986–87 (Socialist Federal Republic of Yugoslavia) Cibona
- 1987–88 (France) Limoges CSP
- 1988–89 (Spain) Real Madrid
- 1989–90 (Italy) Knorr Bologna
- 1990–91 (Greece) PAOK
- 1991–92 (Spain) Real Madrid Asegurator
- 1992–93 (Greece) Sato Aris
- 1993–94 (Slovenia) Smelt Olimpija
- 1994–95 (Italy) Benetton Treviso
- 1995–96 (Spain) Taugrés
- 1996–97 (Spain) Real Madrid Teka
- 1997–98 (Lithuania) Žalgiris
- 1998–99 (Italy) Benetton Treviso
- 1999–00 (Greece) AEK
- 2000–01 (Greece) Maroussi
- 2001–02 (Italy) Montepaschi Siena

== Finals ==
For finals not played on a single match, * precedes the score of the team playing at home.

Year	Host city	Champion	Runner Up	1st Game / Final	2nd Game	3rd Game	4th Game	5th Game
1966–67; Details	Varese & Tel Aviv	(Italy) Ignis Varese	(Israel) Maccabi Tel Aviv	*77–67	67–*68	–
1967–68; Details	Athens	(Greece) AEK	(Czechoslovakia) Slavia VŠ Praha	89–82	–
1968–69; Details	Vienna	(Czechoslovakia) Slavia VŠ Praha	(Soviet Union) Dinamo Tbilisi	80–74	–
1969–70; Details	Vichy & Naples	(Italy) Fides Napoli	(France) JA Vichy	60–*64	*87–65	–
1970–71; Details	Leningrad & Milan	(Italy) Simmenthal Milano	(Soviet Union) Spartak Leningrad	55–*66	*71–52	–
1971–72; Details	Thessaloniki	(Italy) Simmenthal Milano	(Socialist Federal Republic of Yugoslavia) Crvena zvezda	74–70	–
1972–73; Details	Thessaloniki	(Soviet Union) Spartak Leningrad	(Socialist Federal Republic of Yugoslavia) Jugoplastika	77–62	–
1973–74; Details	Udine	(Socialist Federal Republic of Yugoslavia) Crvena zvezda	(Czechoslovakia) Spartak ZJŠ Brno	86–75	–
1974–75; Details	Nantes	(Soviet Union) Spartak Leningrad	(Socialist Federal Republic of Yugoslavia) Crvena zvezda	63–62	–
1975–76; Details	Turin	(Italy) Cinzano Milano	(France) ASPO Tours	88–73	–
1976–77; Details	Palma de Mallorca	(Italy) Birra Forst Cantù	(Socialist Federal Republic of Yugoslavia) Radnički Belgrade	87–86	–
1977–78; Details	Milan	(Italy) Gabetti Cantù	(Italy) Sinudyne Bologna	84–82	–
1978–79; Details	Poreč	(Italy) Gabetti Cantù	(Netherlands) EBBC	83–73	–
1979–80; Details	Milan	(Italy) Emerson Varese	(Italy) Gabetti Cantù	90–88	–
1980–81; Details	Rome	(Italy) Squibb Cantù	(Spain) FC Barcelona	86–82	–
1981–82; Details	Brussels	(Socialist Federal Republic of Yugoslavia) Cibona	(Spain) Real Madrid	96–95	–
1982–83; Details	Palma de Mallorca	(Italy) Scavolini Pesaro	(France) ASVEL	111–99	–
1983–84; Details	Ostend	(Spain) Real Madrid	(Italy) Simac Milano	82–81	–
1984–85; Details	Grenoble	(Spain) FC Barcelona	(Soviet Union) Žalgiris	77–73	–
1985–86; Details	Caserta	(Spain) FC Barcelona	(Italy) Scavolini Pesaro	101–86	–
1986–87; Details	Novi Sad	(Socialist Federal Republic of Yugoslavia) Cibona	(Italy) Scavolini Pesaro	89–74	–
1987–88; Details	Grenoble	(France) Limoges CSP	(Spain) Ram Joventut	96–89	–
1988–89; Details	Athens	(Spain) Real Madrid	(Italy) Snaidero Caserta	119–113 (OT)	–
1989–90; Details	Florence	(Italy) Knorr Bologna	(Spain) Real Madrid	79–74	–
1990–91; Details	Geneva	(Greece) PAOK	(Spain) CAI Zaragoza	76–72	–
1991–92; Details	Nantes	(Spain) Real Madrid Asegurator	(Greece) PAOK	65–63	–
1992–93; Details	Turin	(Greece) Sato Aris	(Turkey) Efes Pilsen	50–48	–
1993–94; Details	Lausanne	(Slovenia) Smelt Olimpija	(Spain) Taugrés	91–81	–
1994–95; Details	Istanbul	(Italy) Benetton Treviso	(Spain) Taugrés	94–86	–
1995–96; Details	Vitoria-Gasteiz	(Spain) Taugrés	(Greece) PAOK	88–81	–
1996–97; Details	Nicosia	(Spain) Real Madrid Teka	(Italy) Mash Jeans Verona	78–64	–
1997–98; Details	Belgrade	(Lithuania) Žalgiris	(Italy) Stefanel Milano	82–67	–
1998–99; Details	Zaragoza	(Italy) Benetton Treviso	(Spain) Pamesa Valencia	64–60	–
1999–00; Details	Lausanne	(Greece) AEK	(Italy) Kinder Bologna	83–76	–
2000–01; Details	Warsaw	(Greece) Maroussi	(France) Élan Chalon	74–72	–
2001–02; Details	Lyon	(Italy) Montepaschi Siena	(Spain) Pamesa Valencia	81–71	–

== Titles by club ==
Rank	Club	Titles	Runner-up	Champion Years
1.	(Spain) Real Madrid	4	2	1983–84, 1988–89, 1991–92, 1996–97
2.	(Italy) Cantù	4	1	1976–77, 1977–78, 1978–79, 1980–81
3.	(Italy) Olimpia Milano	3	2	1970–71, 1971–72, 1975–76
4.	(Soviet Union) Spartak Leningrad	2	1	1972–73, 1974–75
5.	(Spain) FC Barcelona	2	1	1984–85, 1985–86
6.	(Italy) Varese	2		1966–67, 1979–80
7.	(Greece) AEK	2		1967–68, 1999–00
8.	(Socialist Federal Republic of Yugoslavia) Cibona	2		1981–82, 1986–87
9.	(Italy) Treviso	2		1994–95, 1998–99
10.	(Socialist Federal Republic of Yugoslavia) Crvena zvezda	1	2	1973–74
11.	(Italy) Victoria Libertas	1	2	1982–83
12.	(Italy) Virtus Bologna	1	2	1989–90
13.	(Greece) PAOK	1	2	1990–91
14.	(Spain) Baskonia	1	2	1995–96
15.	(Czechoslovakia) USK Praha	1	1	1968–69
16.	(Lithuania) Žalgiris	1	1	1997–98
17.	(Italy) Partenope Napoli	1		1969–70
18.	(France) Limoges CSP	1		1987–88
19.	(Greece) Aris	1		1992–93
20.	(Slovenia) Olimpija	1		1993–94
21.	(Greece) Maroussi	1		2000–01
22.	(Italy) Mens Sana 1871	1		2001–02
23.	(Spain) Valencia		2
24.	(Israel) Maccabi Tel Aviv		1
25.	(Soviet Union) Dinamo Tbilisi		1
26.	(France) JA Vichy		1
27.	(Socialist Federal Republic of Yugoslavia) Split		1
28.	(Czechoslovakia) Brno		1
29.	(France) ASPO Tours		1
30.	(Socialist Federal Republic of Yugoslavia) Radnički Belgrade		1
31.	(Netherlands) Den Bosch		1
32.	(France) ASVEL		1
33.	(Spain) Joventut Badalona		1
34.	(Italy) JuveCaserta		1
35.	(Spain) Zaragoza		1
36.	(Turkey) Efes Pilsen		1
37.	(Italy) Scaligera Verona		1
38.	(France) Élan Chalon		1

== Titles by nation ==
Rank	Country	Titles	Runners-up
1.	Italy	15	9
2.	Spain	7	9
3.	Greece	5	2
4.	(Socialist Federal Republic of Yugoslavia) Yugoslavia	3	4
5.	Soviet Union	2	3
6.	France	1	4
7.	Czechoslovakia	1	2
8.	Slovenia	1
9.	Lithuania	1
10.	Israel		1
11.	Netherlands		1
12.	Turkey		1

== See also ==
- FIBA Saporta Cup
- FIBA Saporta Cup Finals MVP
- FIBA Saporta Cup Finals Top Scorer
- FIBA Saporta Cup Top Scorer
- FIBA Saporta Cup Records
- FIBA Festivals
- FIBA EuroStars
