= 1997–98 FIBA EuroLeague =

Sports season

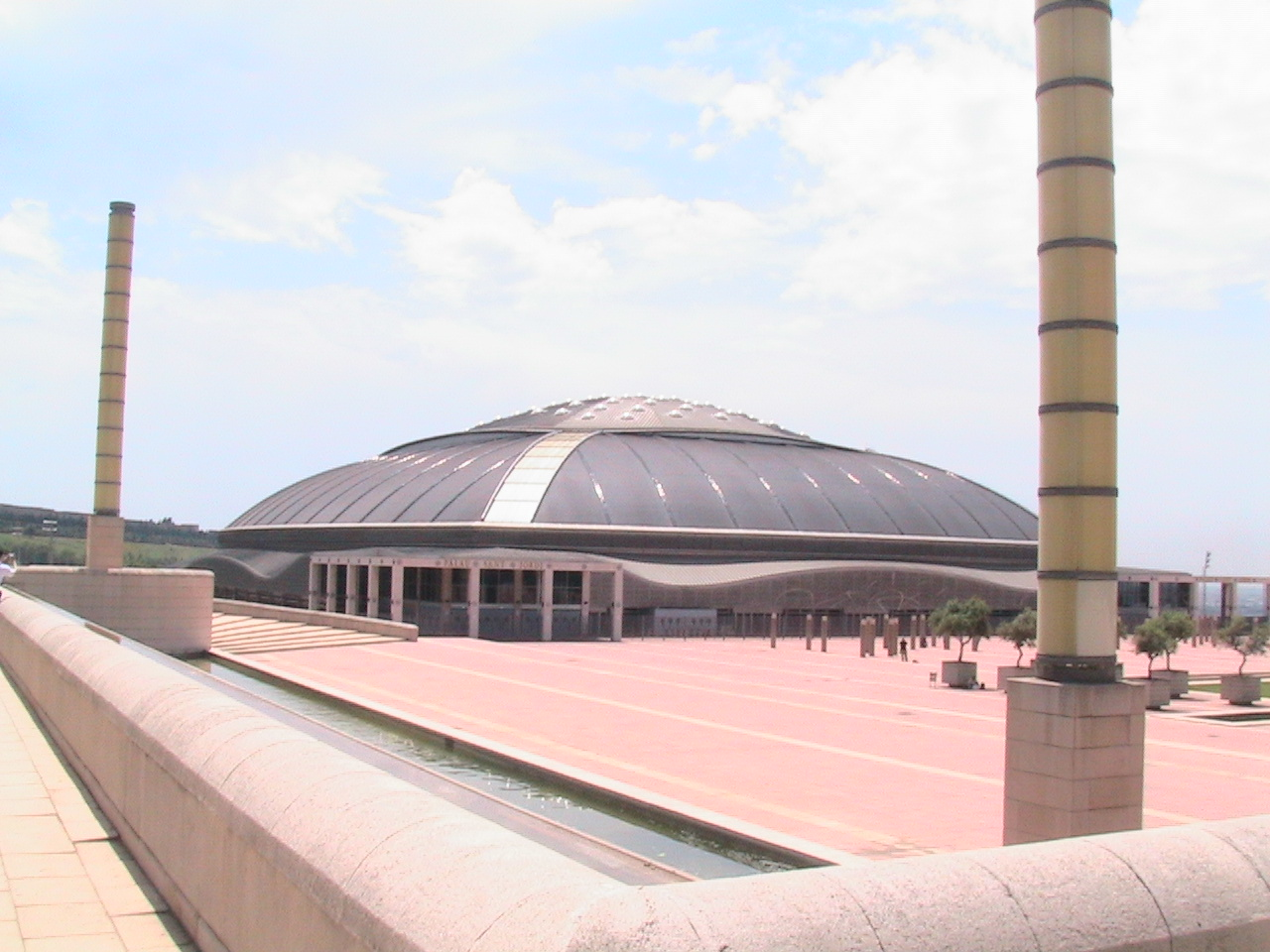
- The Palau Sant Jordi in Barcelona hosted the final Four
- Season: 1997–98
- Dates: September 18, 1997 – April 23, 1998
- Teams: 24

Finals
- Champions: (Italy) Kinder Bologna (1st title)
- Runners-up: (Greece) AEK
- Third place: (Italy) Benetton Treviso
- Fourth place: (Federal Republic of Yugoslavia) Partizan Zepter
- Final Four MVP: (Federal Republic of Yugoslavia) Zoran Savić

Statistical leaders
Points	(Federal Republic of Yugoslavia) Peja Stojaković	20.9
Rebounds	(Federal Republic of Yugoslavia) Dejan Tomašević	9.6
Assists	(United States) Willie Anderson	4.4

The 1997–98 FIBA EuroLeague was the 41st installment of the European top-tier level professional club competition for basketball clubs (now called simply EuroLeague). It began on September 18, 1997, and ended on April 23, 1998. The competition's Final Four was held at Palau Sant Jordi, Barcelona, with Kinder Bologna defeating AEK in the EuroLeague Final, in front of 11,900 spectators.

Benetton Treviso finished in the third position, while Partizan finished fourth.

== Competition system ==
- 24 teams (the national domestic league champions from the best leagues, and a variable number of other clubs from the most important national domestic leagues). The competition culminated in a Final Four.

== Country ranking ==
For the 1997–1998 EuroLeague, the countries are allocated places according to their place on the FIBA country rankings, which takes into account their performance in European competitions from 1994–95 to 1996–97.

Country ranking for 1997–1998 FIBA EuroLeague

Rank	Country	Points	Teams	Notes
1	Spain	279.667	3	
2	Greece	275.000	3	
3	Italy	190.833	3	
4	France	117.500	3	
5	Turkey	96.667	2	+1, Ulker got wild card
6	Russia	70.542	2	Lost one berth
7	Germany	55.389	2	Lost one berth
8	Croatia	50.833	2	
9	Israel	43.048	1	+1, Hapoel Jerusalem got wild card
10	Slovenia	38.833	1	
11	FR Yugoslavia	25.000	1	
12	Portugal	23.071	1	
13	Belgium	22.500	0	
14	Poland	21.206	0	
15	Lithuania	19.416	0	
16	Ukraine	15.762	0	
17	Hungary	9.667	0	
18	Czech Republic	7.139	0	
19	Slovakia	6.555	0	

Rank	Country	Points	Teams	Notes
20	Macedonia	6.111	0	
21	Austria	5.445	0	
22	Sweden	5.333	0	
23	Cyprus	4.333	0	
24	England	4.167	0	
25	Latvia	3.722	0	
26	Switzerland	3.083	0	
27	Bulgaria	2.694	0	
28	Romania	2.389	0	
29	Finland	1.861	0	
30	Bosnia and Herzegovina	1.778	0	
31	Estonia	1.500	0	
32	Netherlands	1.500	0	
33	Georgia	1.500	0	
34	Luxembourg	1.444	0	
35	Albania	1.361	0	
36	Denmark	0.167	0	
37	Moldova	0.111	0	
38	Belarus	0.056	0	

Note

1. FIBA: In Euroleague, teams finishing 6th in the Second Stage of 1996–97 FIBA EuroLeague (groups E-H) lose a berth for their country in next season. These berths are gained by those countries whose teams reach the Semifinal Round in the 1996–97 FIBA EuroCup. As a general rule, a federation cannot have more than 3 teams in Euroleague. Should a semi-finalist in EuroCup provide one more berth for its country, in case it already has 3 berths assigned in Euroleague, this berth will be transferred to the next federation in FIBA Ranking which has 2 teams (as long as one of its teams reached the 1/4 Final Round in EuroCup during the same season)..

== Team allocation ==
The labels in the parentheses show how each team qualified for the place of its starting round:

- 1st, 2nd, 3rd, etc.: League position after Playoffs
- WC: Wild card

Regular season
(Spain) FC Barcelona Banca Catalana (1st)	(Italy) Benetton Treviso (1st)	(Turkey) Efes Pilsen (1st)	(Israel) Maccabi Elite Tel Aviv (1st)
(Spain) Real Madrid Teka (2nd)	(Italy) Teamsystem Bologna (2nd)	(Turkey) Türk Telekom PTT (2nd)	(Israel) Hapoel Jerusalem (WC)
(Spain) Estudiantes (3rd)	(Italy) Kinder Bologna (3rd)	(Turkey) Ülker (WC)	(Germany) Alba Berlin (1st)
(Greece) Olympiacos (1st)	(France) PSG Racing (1st)	(Croatia) Cibona (1st)	(Slovenia) Union Olimpija (1st)
(Greece) AEK (2nd)	(France) Pau-Orthez (3rd)	(Croatia) Split (2nd)	(Federal Republic of Yugoslavia) Partizan Zepter (1st)
(Greece) PAOK (3rd)	(France) Limoges CSP (4th)	(Russia) CSKA Moscow (1st)	(Portugal) FC Porto (1st)

== Preliminary round ==
=== Group A ===
Pos	Team	Pld	W	L	PF	PA	PD	Pts	Qualification	OLY	EFE	MAC	CSK	RMA	LIM
1	(Greece) Olympiacos	10	7	3	722	702	+20	17	Advance to Group E	—	61–60	71–76	86–74	82–75	69–57
2	(Turkey) Efes Pilsen	10	6	4	718	674	+44	16	Advance to Group E	67–70	—	81–69	71–63	78–81	65–64
3	(Israel) Maccabi Elite Tel Aviv	10	5	5	747	739	+8	15	Advance to Group E	73–87	61–70	—	87–69	87–82	78–62
4	(Russia) CSKA Moscow	10	5	5	763	756	+7	15	Advance to Group F	77–58	77–73	71–63	—	90–77	83–70
5	(Spain) Real Madrid Teka	10	4	6	787	793	−6	14	Advance to Group F	77–78	66–76	68–76	101–93	—	75–62
6	(France) Limoges CSP	10	3	7	662	735	−73	13	Advance to Group F	66–60	62–77	78–77	70–66	71–85	—

Source: FIBA Europe
Legend: Blue = home team win; Red = away team win.

=== Group B ===
Pos	Team	Pld	W	L	PF	PA	PD	Pts	Qualification	BEN	EST	PAO	TTA	SPL	POR
1	(Italy) Benetton Treviso	10	9	1	782	664	+118	19	Advance to Group F	—	98–58	65–57	71–66	85–70	76–67
2	(Spain) Estudiantes	10	6	4	753	747	+6	16	Advance to Group F	58–73	—	78–60	71–73	77–73	86–63
3	(Greece) PAOK	10	6	4	729	672	+57	16	Advance to Group F	65–62	72–76	—	72–63	89–60	84–50
4	(Turkey) Türk Telekom PTT	10	5	5	711	716	−5	15	Advance to Group E	67–84	80–88	73–66	—	78–69	79–62
5	(Croatia) Split	10	4	6	747	768	−21	14	Advance to Group E	72–77	86–69	74–76	72–56	—	88–82
6	(Portugal) FC Porto	10	0	10	688	843	−155	10	Advance to Group E	84–91	69–92	71–88	61–76	79–83	—

Source: FIBA Europe
Legend: Blue = home team win; Red = away team win.

=== Group C ===
Pos	Team	Pld	W	L	PF	PA	PD	Pts	Qualification	KIN	FCB	PAU	PAR	ÜLK	HAP
1	(Italy) Kinder Bologna	10	9	1	773	655	+118	19	Advance to Group G	—	83–70	72–79	77–72	94–64	73–51
2	(Spain) FC Barcelona Banca Catalana	10	7	3	828	793	+35	17	Advance to Group G	71–84	—	85–62	87–71	89–80	68–65
3	(France) Pau-Orthez	10	5	5	739	750	−11	15	Advance to Group G	65–67	94–95	—		77–76	73–65
4	(Federal Republic of Yugoslavia) Partizan Zepter	10	4	6	793	807	−14	14	Advance to Group H	49–74	106–110	86–72	—	95–86	79–59
5	(Turkey) Ülker	10	3	7	734	769	−35	13	Advance to Group H	66–68	67–65	67–64	80–81	—	74–56
6	(Israel) Hapoel Jerusalem	10	2	8	680	773	−93	12	Advance to Group H	68–81	81–88	67–79	88–84	80–74	—

Source: FIBA Europe
Legend: Blue = home team win; Red = away team win.

=== Group D ===
Pos	Team	Pld	W	L	PF	PA	PD	Pts	Qualification	AEK	TEA	CIB	ALB	UOL	PSG
1	(Greece) AEK	10	6	4	683	653	+30	16	Advance to Group H	—	80–57	70–55	79–80	74–65	57–52
2	(Italy) Teamsystem Bologna	10	6	4	753	788	−35	16	Advance to Group H	70–67	—	77–75	80–73	77–61	93–77
3	(Croatia) Cibona	10	5	5	741	732	+9	15	Advance to Group H	67–63	87–92	—	98–84	78–75	61–73
4	(Germany) Alba Berlin	10	5	5	752	754	−2	15	Advance to Group G	60–67	95–79	74–73	—	82–74	79–71
5	(Slovenia) Union Olimpija	10	4	6	701	716	−15	14	Advance to Group G	71–74	89–68	59–76	78–72	—	59–76
6	(France) PSG Racing	10	4	6	668	655	+13	14	Advance to Group G	76–52	84–60	65–71	55–53	66–69	—

Source: FIBA Europe
Legend: Blue = home team win; Red = away team win.

== Qualification round ==
(The individual scores and standings of the first round are accumulated in the second round)

If one or more clubs are level on won-lost record, tiebreakers are applied in the following order:

1. Head-to-head record in matches between the tied clubs
2. Overall point difference in games between the tied clubs
3. Overall point difference in all group matches (first tiebreaker if tied clubs are not in the same group)
4. Points scored in all group matches
5. Sum of quotients of points scored and points allowed in each group match

=== Group E ===
Pos	Team	Pld	W	L	PF	PA	PD	Pts	Qualification	OLY	EFE	MAC	SPL	TTA	POR
1	(Greece) Olympiacos	16	12	4	1176	1098	+78	28	Advance to Play Offs	—			90–79	64–60	73–54
2	(Turkey) Efes Pilsen	16	12	4	1232	1106	+126	28	Advance to Play Offs		—		86–75	74–68	80–71
3	(Israel) Maccabi Elite Tel Aviv	16	11	5	1236	1152	+84	27	Advance to Play Offs			—	78–69	87–76	88–69
4	(Croatia) Split	16	5	11	1185	1243	−58	21	Advance to Play Offs	60–53	82–93	73–75	—		
5	(Turkey) Türk Telekom PTT	16	5	11	1131	1185	−54	21		80–82	69–83	67–79		—	
6	(Portugal) FC Porto	16	0	16	1071	1356	−285	16		63–92	67–98	59–82			—

Source: FIBA Europe
Legend: Blue = home team win; Red = away team win.

=== Group F ===
Pos	Team	Pld	W	L	PF	PA	PD	Pts	Qualification	BEN	CSK	PAO	EST	RMA	LIM
1	(Italy) Benetton Treviso	16	12	4	1213	1100	+113	28	Advance to Play Offs	—	83–77			65–56	96–70
2	(Russia) CSKA Moscow	16	9	7	1217	1159	+58	25	Advance to Play Offs	82–65	—	78–48	74–68		
3	(Greece) PAOK	16	9	7	1119	1083	+36	25	Advance to Play Offs		61–58	—		63–59	85–76
4	(Spain) Estudiantes	16	8	8	1171	1191	−20	24	Advance to Play Offs		78–85		—	68–65	68–62
5	(Spain) Real Madrid Teka	16	7	9	1187	1165	+22	23		82–54		63–58	75–64	—	
6	(France) Limoges CSP	16	6	10	1099	1199	−100	22		69–68		77–75	83–72		—

Source: FIBA Europe
Legend: Blue = home team win; Red = away team win.

=== Group G ===
Pos	Team	Pld	W	L	PF	PA	PD	Pts	Qualification	KIN	ALB	FCB	UOL	PSG	PAU
1	(Italy) Kinder Bologna	16	11	5	1234	1175	+59	27	Advance to Play Offs	—	81–66		72–62	69–52	
2	(Germany) Alba Berlin	16	10	6	1193	1167	+26	26	Advance to Play Offs	85–69	—	81–78			66–55
3	(Spain) FC Barcelona Banca Catalana	16	9	7	1236	1131	+105	25	Advance to Play Offs		77–78	—	84–65	78–77	
4	(Slovenia) Union Olimpija	16	9	7	1209	1173	+36	25	Advance to Play Offs	76–60		92–60	—		71–68
5	(France) PSG Racing	16	8	8	1177	1175	+2	24		62–72		69–68		—	70–51
6	(France) Pau-Orthez	16	1	15	1123	1297	−174	17			94–75		76–77	61–64	—

Source: FIBA Europe
Legend: Blue = home team win; Red = away team win.

=== Group H ===
Pos	Team	Pld	W	L	PF	PA	PD	Pts	Qualification	AEK	TEA	CIB	PAR	ÜLK	HAP
1	(Greece) AEK	16	11	5	1123	1055	+68	27	Advance to Play Offs	—			68–76	81–73	65–51
2	(Italy) Teamsystem Bologna	16	10	6	1206	1232	−26	26	Advance to Play Offs		—		85–82	80–74	79–60
3	(Croatia) Cibona	16	10	6	1245	1204	+41	26	Advance to Play Offs			—	84–66	91–86	81–79
4	(Federal Republic of Yugoslavia) Partizan Zepter	16	6	10	1234	1261	−27	22	Advance to Play Offs	71–73	76–66	70–78	—		
5	(Turkey) Ülker	16	5	11	1201	1242	−41	21		63–70	83–69	88–82		—	
6	(Israel) Hapoel Jerusalem	16	2	14	1090	1243	−153	18		68–83	69–74	83–88			—

Source: FIBA Europe
Legend: Blue = home team win; Red = away team win.

== Playoffs ==
=== Bracket ===
Teams in bold advanced to the next round. The numbers to the left of each team indicate the team's seeding, the numbers to the right indicate the result of games including result in bold of the team that won in that game, and the numbers furthest to the right indicate the number of games the team won in that round.

Eight-Finals
E1	(Greece) Olympiacos	74	60	0
**H4**	**(Federal Republic of Yugoslavia) Partizan Zepter**	**78**	**72**	**2**
**F2**	**(Russia) CSKA Moscow**	**81**	63	**88**	**2**
G3	(Spanish Basketball Federation) FC Barcelona Banca Catalana	79	**75**	76	1
**G1**	**(Italy) Kinder Bologna**	**86**	**67**	**2**
F4	(Spain) Estudiantes	62	62	0
**H2**	**(Italy) Teamsystem Bologna**	**96**	72	**68**	**2**
E3	(Israel) Maccabi Elite Tel Aviv	93	**88**	65	1
**F1**	**(Italy) Benetton Treviso**	**81**	**70**	**2**
G4	(Slovenia) Union Olimpija	79	61	0
**E2**	**(Turkey) Efes Pilsen**	**75**	**102**	**2**
H3	(Croatia) Cibona	59	98	0
**H1**	**(Greece) AEK**	**76**	**62**	**2**
E4	(Croatia) Split	46	54	0
**G2**	**(Germany) Alba Berlin**	**77**	60	**104**	**2**
F3	(Greece) PAOK	75	**81**	71	1

Quarter-Finals
**(Federal Republic of Yugoslavia) Partizan Zepter**	**87**	52	**89**	**2**
(Russia) CSKA Moscow	72	**77**	77	1
**(Italy) Kinder Bologna**	**64**	**58**	**2**
(Italy) Teamsystem Bologna	52	56	0
**(Italy) Benetton Treviso**	**67**	58	**76**	**2**
(Turkey) Efes Pilsen	57	**59**	68	1
**(Greece) AEK**	**88**	**82**	**2**
(Germany) Alba Berlin	68	58	0

Semi-Finals
(Federal Republic of Yugoslavia) Partizan Zepter	61
**(Italy) Kinder Bologna**	**83**
(Italy) Benetton Treviso	66
**(Greece) AEK**	**69**

Final
**(Italy) Kinder Bologna**	**58**
(Greece) AEK	44
Third Place
(Federal Republic of Yugoslavia) Partizan Zepter	89
**(Italy) Benetton Treviso**	**96**

=== Eight-Finals ===
Team 1	Agg.	Team 2	1st leg	2nd leg	3rd leg
CSKA Moscow (Russia)	2–1	(Spain) FC Barcelona Banca Catalana	81–79	63–75	88–76
Olympiacos (Greece)	0–2	(Federal Republic of Yugoslavia) Partizan Zepter	74–78	60–72	
Teamsystem Bologna (Italy)	2–1	(Israel) Maccabi Elite Tel Aviv	96–93	72–88	68–65
Kinder Bologna (Italy)	2–0	(Spain) Estudiantes	86–62	67–62	
Efes Pilsen (Turkey)	2–0	(Croatia) Cibona	75–59	102–98	
Benetton Treviso (Italy)	2–0	(Slovenia) Union Olimpija	81–79	70–61	
Alba Berlin (Germany)	2–1	(Greece) PAOK	77–75(o)	60–81	104–71
AEK (Greece)	2–0	(Croatia) Split	76–46	62–54	

=== Quarter-Finals ===
Team 1	Agg.	Team 2	1st leg	2nd leg	3rd leg
Partizan Zepter (Federal Republic of Yugoslavia)	2–1	(Russia) CSKA Moscow	87–72	52–77	89–77
Kinder Bologna (Italy)	2–0	(Italy) Teamsystem Bologna	64–52	58–56	
Benetton Treviso (Italy)	2–1	(Turkey) Efes Pilsen	67–57	58–59	76–68
AEK (Greece)	2–0	(Germany) Alba Berlin	88–68	82–58	

== Final four ==
=== Semifinals ===
April 21, Palau Sant Jordi, Barcelona

Team 1	Score	Team 2
Partizan Zepter (Federal Republic of Yugoslavia)	61–83	(Italy) Kinder Bologna
Benetton Treviso (Italy)	66–69	(Greece) AEK

=== 3rd place game ===
April 23, Palau Sant Jordi, Barcelona

Team 1	Score	Team 2
Partizan Zepter (Federal Republic of Yugoslavia)	89–96	(Italy) Benetton Treviso

=== Final ===
April 23, Palau Sant Jordi, Barcelona

Team 1	Score	Team 2
Kinder Bologna (Italy)	58–44	(Greece) AEK

1997–98 FIBA EuroLeague Champions

Kinder Bologna
1st Title

=== Final standings ===
	Team
	(Italy) Kinder Bologna
Silver medal	(Greece) AEK
Bronze medal	(Italy) Benetton Treviso
	(Federal Republic of Yugoslavia) Partizan Zepter

== Awards ==
All official awards of the 1997–98 FIBA EuroLeague.

=== FIBA EuroLeague Final Four MVP ===
- (Federal Republic of Yugoslavia) Zoran Savić ( (Italy) Kinder Bologna)

=== FIBA EuroLeague All-Final Four Team ===
First Team
(France) Antoine Rigaudeau	(Italy) Kinder Bologna
(Federal Republic of Yugoslavia) Sasha Danilović	(Italy) Kinder Bologna
(United States) Henry Williams	(Italy) Benetton Treviso
(Federal Republic of Yugoslavia) Dejan Tomašević	(Federal Republic of Yugoslavia) Partizan Zepter
(Federal Republic of Yugoslavia) Zoran Savić (MVP)	(Italy) Kinder Bologna

=== FIBA EuroLeague Top Scorer ===
- (Federal Republic of Yugoslavia) Peja Stojaković ( (Greece) PAOK)

=== FIBA EuroLeague Finals Top Scorer ===
- (France) Antoine Rigaudeau ( (Italy) Kinder Bologna)

== Statistics ==
=== Individual statistics ===
==== Points ====
Rank	Name	Team	Games	Points	PPG
1.	(Federal Republic of Yugoslavia) Peja Stojaković	(Greece) PAOK	16	335	20.9
2.	(Turkey) Harun Erdenay	(Turkey) Ülker	16	321	20.1
3.	(Israel) Oded Kattash	(Israel) Maccabi Elite Tel Aviv	19	372	19.6

Source: FIBAEurope

==== Rebounds ====
Rank	Name	Team	Games	Rebounds	RPG
1.	(Federal Republic of Yugoslavia) Dejan Tomašević	(Federal Republic of Yugoslavia) Partizan Zepter	23	221	9.6
2.	(Turkey) Mirsad Türkcan	(Turkey) Efes Pilsen	21	194	9.2
3.	(United States) Conrad McRae	(Greece) PAOK	19	167	8.8

Source: FIBAEurope

==== Assists ====
Rank	Name	Team	Games	Assists	APG
1.	(United States) Willie Anderson	(Greece) AEK	12	53	4.4
2.	(North Macedonia) Petar Naumoski	(Turkey) Efes Pilsen	17	71	4.2
3.	(Federal Republic of Yugoslavia) Aleksandar Đorđević	(Spain) FC Barcelona B.Catalana	18	74	4.1

Source: FIBAEurope

==== Other statistics ====
Category	Player	Team	Games	Average
Steals	(United States) David Rivers	(Italy) Teamsystem Bologna	21	2.9
Turnovers	(United States) Michael Anderson	(Turkey) Ülker	16	3.1
Minutes	(North Macedonia) Petar Naumoski	(Turkey) Efes Pilsen	17	39.9
FT %	(Russia) Valeriy Dayneko	(Russia) CSKA Moscow	22	87.8%
2-Point %	(Federal Republic of Yugoslavia) Radisav Ćurčić	(Israel) Hapoel Jerusalem	16	63.6%
3-Point %	(Spain) Roger Esteller	(Spain) FC Barcelona B.Catalana	19	52.1%

=== Individual game highs ===
Category	Player	Team	Statistic	Opponent
Points	(Federal Republic of Yugoslavia) Aleksandar Đorđević	(Spain) FC Barcelona B.Catalana	39	(Federal Republic of Yugoslavia) Partizan Zepter (Nov 12, 1997)
Rebounds	(United States) Kevin Rankin	(Turkey) Ülker	19	(Greece) AEK (Jan 14, 1998)
Assists	(Germany) Henrik Rödl	(Germany) Alba Berlin	12	(Italy) Teamsystem Bologna (Nov 6, 1997)
Assists	(Federal Republic of Yugoslavia) Aleksandar Đorđević	(Spain) FC Barcelona B.Catalana	12	(Turkey) Ülker (Dec 11, 1997)
Steals	(United States) Marcus Webb	(Russia) CSKA Moscow	11	(Greece) PAOK (Jan 8, 1998)

=== Team statistics ===
Category	Team	Average
Points	(Spain) FC Barcelona B.Catalana	79.1
Rebounds	(Spain) Estudiantes	30.8
Assists	(Germany) Alba Berlin	14.3
Steals	(Russia) CSKA Moscow	11.7
Turnovers	(Portugal) FC Porto	15.8
FT %	(Israel) Hapoel Jerusalem	75.1%
2-Point %	(Spain) Real Madrid Teka	57.9%
2-Point %	(Italy) Benetton Treviso	57.9%
3-Point %	(Greece) Olympiacos	40.7%

== See also ==
- 1997–98 FIBA EuroCup
- 1997–98 FIBA Korać Cup
