= Roy Tarpley =

American basketball player (1964–2015)

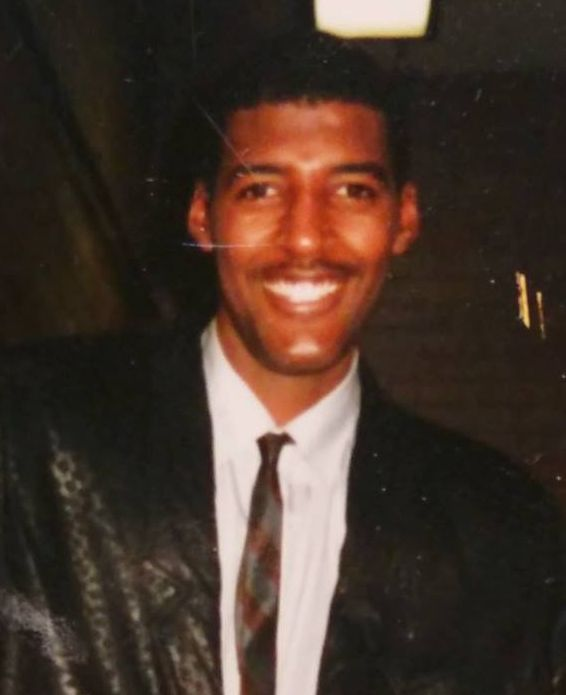
- Tarpley in 1985

Personal information
- Born: November 28, 1964 New York City, New York, U.S.
- Died: January 9, 2015 (aged 50) Arlington, Texas, U.S.
- Listed height: 6 ft 11 in (2.11 m)
- Listed weight: 230 lb (104 kg)

Career information
- High school: Cooley (Detroit, Michigan)
- College: Michigan (1982–1986)
- NBA draft: 1986: 1st round, 7th overall pick
- Drafted by: Dallas Mavericks
- Playing career: 1986–2006
- Position: Power forward / center
- Number: 42

Career history
- 1986–1991: Dallas Mavericks
- 1991–1992: Wichita Falls Texans
- 1992: Miami Tropics
- 1992–1993: Aris
- 1993–1994: Olympiacos
- 1994–1995: Dallas Mavericks
- 1996: Iraklis
- 1998–1999: Apollon Limassol
- 1999: Esperos Kallitheas
- 1999–2000: Ural Great
- 2000–2001: Beijing Olympians
- 2003–2004: Sioux Falls Skyforce
- 2005: Dodge City Legend
- 2005–2006: Michigan Mayhem

Career highlights
- NBA Sixth Man of the Year (1988); NBA All-Rookie First Team (1987); FIBA Saporta Cup champion (1993); FIBA Saporta Cup Top Scorer (1993); FIBA Saporta Cup Finals Top Scorer (1993); EuroLeague rebounding leader (1994); Greek League Hall of Fame (2022); Greek League champion (1994); Greek League rebounding leader (1993); Greek Cup winner (1994); CBA All-Star (2004); USBL Player of the Year (1992); Second-team All-American – USBWA (1985); 2× Third-team All-American – AP (1985, 1986); Third-team All-American – UPI (1985); Third-team All-American – NABC (1986); Big Ten Player of the Year (1985)

Career NBA statistics
- Points: 3,533 (12.6 ppg)
- Rebounds: 2,803 (10.0 rpg)
- Stats at NBA.com
- Stats at Basketball Reference

Roy James Tarpley Jr. (November 28, 1964 – January 9, 2015) was an American professional basketball player. He played the power forward and center positions in the National Basketball Association (NBA), earning an NBA Sixth Man of the Year Award in 1988. In 1995, Tarpley was permanently banned by the NBA due to his drug and alcohol abuse. He played in Europe for Olympiacos, Aris, and Iraklis.

== College career ==
Tarpley starred for the Michigan Wolverines, and was named a third-team All-American by the Associated Press in 1985 and 1986. In the 1984–85 season Tarpley led the Wolverines to the Big Ten championship, averaging 19.0 points and 10.4 rebounds per game throughout the season, himself earning the Big Ten Player of the Year award. On February 7, 1985, he posted a career-high in scoring against Purdue with 31 points. In his senior season Tarpley set the school record for most blocked shots in a game against Florida Southern. He led his school in blocked shots in each of his college years, and he also led the school in scoring and rebounding in all but his freshman season. As of March 2014, he was the Wolverines' all-time leader in blocked shots with 251. Tarpley finished his college career posting averages of 13.1 points, 7.8 rebounds and 2.1 blocks per game.

== Professional career ==
=== Dallas Mavericks (1986–1991) ===
In 1986, Tarpley was selected by the Dallas Mavericks, in the first round, with the seventh pick of the NBA draft. Tarpley made the NBA All-Rookie Team in his first season. In October 1987, he publicly disclosed his alcohol and cocaine problems for the first time. The following year, Tarpley won the NBA Sixth Man of the Year Award, when he averaged 13.5 points and 11.8 rebounds per game. During the 1988 NBA Playoffs, he and the Mavericks nearly made it to the NBA Finals, losing in the Western Conference Finals to the Los Angeles Lakers. In the seven-game series, Tarpley averaged 15.9 points, 13 rebounds, and 2.1 blocks. The following season, on November 9, 1988, Tarpley scored a career high 35 points and grabbed 17 rebounds in a 111–103 loss to the Phoenix Suns.

In November 1989, six games into the 1989–90 season, he was arrested for driving while intoxicated and resisting arrest, and suspended by the NBA the following day. Tarpley was reinstated in January 1990. In April 1991, he drew another suspension, after being arrested for DWI again. A few months later, in October 1991, after a third violation (refusing to take a drug test), he was banned from the league for life for violating the NBA's drug-use policies.

=== Return to Dallas (1994–1995) ===
Tarpley returned to the Mavericks briefly in 1994, but was then permanently banned from the NBA in December 1995, for using alcohol and violating the terms of a court-imposed personal aftercare program. He finished with NBA career averages of 12.6 points and 10.0 rebounds per game.

Tarpley sued the Dallas Mavericks and the NBA, claiming that their refusal to reinstate him violated the Americans with Disabilities Act because his addiction was a disability. The suit was settled out of court in January 2009.

=== Europe ===
Tarpley then signed a two-year contract with Greek club Aris for $1,25 million. In the 1992–93 FIBA European Cup season, he won the European-wide second-tier level FIBA European Cup, with Sato Aris, against the Turkish Super League club Efes Pilsen. The tournament's final took place in Turin. He also played for Olympiacos, Iraklis, Apollon Limassol and Esperos Kallitheas in Greece's top-tier level professional basketball league, the Greek Basket League.

Tarpley reached the European-wide top-tier level EuroLeague's Final, the following year, by playing in the 1994 EuroLeague Final Four. During the final four, he played with Olympiacos, against 7up Joventut, in Tel Aviv. That same year, he led the EuroLeague competition in rebounds, with an average of 12.8 per game. With Olympiacos, Tarpley also won the Greek League and the Greek Cup.

=== Michigan Mayhem (2005–2006) ===
Tarpley played with the Michigan Mayhem of the Continental Basketball Association (CBA) during part of the 2005–2006 season before suffering a season-ending hand injury. He was selected to the CBA All-Star Game, but missed the game because of his injury.

== Death ==
Tarpley died on January 9, 2015, at age 50, in Arlington, Texas. No official cause of death was released, but reports indicated that it was due to liver failure.

== Career statistics ==
Legend
GP	Games played	GS	Games started	MPG	Minutes per game
FG%	Field goal percentage	3P%	3-point field goal percentage	FT%	Free throw percentage
RPG	Rebounds per game	APG	Assists per game	SPG	Steals per game
BPG	Blocks per game	PPG	Points per game	**Bold**	Career high

=== NBA ===
==== Regular season ====
Year	Team	GP	GS	MPG	FG%	3P%	FT%	RPG	APG	SPG	BPG	PPG
1986–87	Dallas	75	1	18.7	.467	**.333**	.676	7.1	.7	.7	1.1	7.5
1987–88	Dallas	**81**	9	28.5	.500	.000	.740	11.8	1.1	1.3	1.1	13.5
1988–89	Dallas	19	6	31.1	.541	.000	.688	11.5	.9	1.5	1.6	17.3
1989–90	Dallas	45	**35**	**36.6**	.451	.000	.756	**13.1**	1.5	**1.8**	1.6	16.8
1990–91	Dallas	5	5	34.2	**.544**	.000	**.889**	11.0	**2.4**	1.2	**1.8**	**20.4**
1994–95	Dallas	55	1	24.6	.479	.278	.836	8.2	1.1	.8	1.0	12.6
Career		280	57	26.7	.483	.176	.744	10.0	1.0	1.1	1.2	12.6

==== Playoffs ====
Year	Team	GP	GS	MPG	FG%	3P%	FT%	RPG	APG	SPG	BPG	PPG
1987	Dallas	4	1	28.5	.500	–	.714	10.5	.3	.3	1.8	13.3
1988	Dallas	**17**	0	33.1	**.519**	.000	**.740**	12.9	**1.8**	1.2	1.5	**17.9**
1990	Dallas	3	**3**	**43.0**	.478	.000	.500	**15.3**	.3	**2.3**	**3.3**	16.7
Career		24	4	33.6	.510	.000	.707	12.8	1.3	1.2	1.8	17.0

== See also ==
- List of people banned or suspended by the NBA
