= Georgios Diamantopoulos =

Greek basketball player

Georgios Diamantopoulos Γιώργος Διαμαντόπουλος
Personal information
- Born: February 15, 1980 (age 46) Cholargos, Attica, Greece
- Listed height: 6 ft 5 in (1.96 m)
- Listed weight: 210 lb (95 kg)

Career information
- Playing career: 1997–2017
- Position: Shooting guard / small forward

Career history
- 1997–1999: Papagou
- 1999–2003: Panionios
- 2003–2004: Olympiacos
- 2004–2005: Panionios
- 2005–2006: Roseto Basket
- 2006: La Palma
- 2007: Samara
- 2007–2008: Kolossos
- 2008–2010: Maroussi
- 2010–2011: Achilleas Kaimakli
- 2012: Vacallo Basket
- 2012–2013: Keravnos
- 2013–2014: Doxa Lefkadas
- 2014–2015: Panionios
- 2015–2016: Papagou
- 2016–2017: Ermionis

Career highlights
- FIBA Saporta Cup Top Scorer (2002); Greek League Top Scorer (2003); Greek All-Star Game MVP (2003)
Medals
Men's basketball
Representing Greece
FIBA Europe Under-18 Championship
Bronze medal – third place	1998 Bulgaria	Under-18

Georgios "Giorgos" Diamantopoulos (Greek: Γεώργιος (Γιώργος) Διαμαντόπουλος; born on February 15, 1980) is a Greek former professional basketball player. At a height of 6 ft 5 in (1.96 m) tall, he played as a shooting guard-small forward. In the prime of his career, he possessed great scoring ability.

== Professional career ==
In the 2001–02 season, Diamantopoulos led the European-wide 2nd-tier level FIBA Saporta Cup in scoring, averaging 22.6 points per game. In the 2002–03 season, he was the Greek League Top Scorer, while playing for Panionios. He was also a player of the Greek League clubs Papagou and Olympiacos Piraeus. He was also a member of the Italian League club Roseto Basket, and the Spanish Second Division club La Palma.

In the 2006–07 season, Diamantopoulos won the FIBA EuroCup Challenge championship, while playing with the Russian Super League club CSK VSS Samara. He then played with the NBA Summer League squad of the NBA club the Indiana Pacers. During the 2007–08 season, he was a member of Kolossos.

He joined Maroussi for the 2008–09 season. He moved to the Cypriot League club Achilleas in 2010, and then to the Swiss League Vacallo Basket in 2012. He also played with the Cypriot club Keravnos in 2012. He joined Doxa Lefkadas in 2013. He returned to Panionios in 2014. In 2015, he moved to Papagou, and to Ermionis in 2016. He retired from playing professional basketball in 2017.

== National team career ==
Diamantopoulos was a member of both the Under-16 and Under-18 junior Greek national basketball teams. He won the bronze medal with Greece at the 1998 FIBA Europe Under-18 Championship. With Greece's national junior teams, he also played at the 1999 FIBA Under-19 World Cup.

He was also a member of the senior men's Greek national basketball team.

== Awards and accomplishments ==
=== Clubs ===
- 3× Greek League All-Star: (2001, 2002, 2003)
- FIBA Saporta Cup Top Scorer: (2002)
- Greek All-Star Game MVP: (2003)
- Greek League Top Scorer: (2003)
- FIBA EuroCup Challenge Champion: (2007)

=== Greek junior national team ===
- 1998 FIBA Europe Under-18 Championship: Bronze
