= Rowan Barrett =

Canadian basketball player (born 1972)

Personal information
- Born: November 24, 1972 (age 53) Toronto, Ontario, Canada
- Listed height: 6 ft 6 in (1.98 m)
- Listed weight: 225 lb (102 kg)

Career information
- High school: West Hill Collegiate Institute (Toronto, Ontario)
- College: St. John's (1992–1996)
- NBA draft: 1996: undrafted
- Playing career: 1997–2008
- Position: Shooting guard / small forward
- Number: 5, 8, 9

Career history
- 1997–1998: Lucentum Alicante
- 1998–1999: Boca Juniors
- 1999, 2001, 2003: Cocodrilos de Caracas
- 2000–2001: Keravnos
- 2001: Dafni
- 2002: Maccabi Rishon LeZion
- 2002: Hapoel Haifa
- 2002–2003: Ramat HaSharon
- 2003–2005: JDA Dijon
- 2005–2006: Cantù
- 2006–2007: ASVEL
- 2007–2008: Élan Chalon

Career highlights
- FIBA Saporta Cup Top Scorer (2001); French League Best Scorer (2005); French League All-Star (2003); Israeli League Top Scorer (2002); Cypriot League champion (2001)

Rowan Alexander Barrett Sr. (born November 24, 1972) is a Canadian former professional basketball player. At a height of 1.98 m (6 ft 6 in) tall, he played at the shooting guard and small forward positions. He was the top scorer in the 2002 Israel Basketball Premier League. He is general manager of the Canadian men's national team.

== High school career ==
Born in the Scarborough district of Toronto, Ontario, Barrett attended West Hill Collegiate Institute, where he played high school basketball.

== College career ==
Barrett played NCAA Division I college basketball at St. John's University, with the St. John's Red Storm, from 1992 to 1996.

== Professional career ==
Barrett was under contract with the Toronto Raptors (1997 and 1999), and Philadelphia 76ers (1999), but he never played in any NBA regular season games with those teams.

Some of the clubs that Barrett played professionally for include: in Spain with Etosa Alicante (2nd Division) (1997–98), in Argentina with Boca Juniors (1998–99), in Venezuela with Cocodrilos de Caracas (1999, 2001, 2003), in Cyprus with Keravnos Keo (2000–01), in Greece with Dafni (2001), in Israel with Maccabi Rishon LeZion (2002), Hapoel Haifa (2002), and Ramat HaSharon (2002–03), in France with JDA Dijon Basket (2003–05), ASVEL Lyon-Villeurbanne (2006–07), and Élan Chalon (2007–08), and in Italy with Vertical Vision Cantù (2005–06).

He was the top scorer in the 2002 Israel Basketball Premier League, scoring 25.5 points per game on 57% two-point shooting and 41% three-point shooting, as he added 5.2 rebounds per game; his one-game highs were 42 points and 10 rebounds. He was the top scorer of the European-wide 2nd-tier level league, the FIBA Saporta Cup, in the 2000–01 season.

== National team career ==
Barrett played for the senior Canadian national basketball team. With Canada, he played at the 1998 FIBA World Championship, the 2000 Summer Olympic Games, and the 2002 FIBA World Championship. He also played at the 1993 FIBA AmeriCup, the 1997 FIBA AmeriCup, the 1999 FIBA AmeriCup, and the 2003 FIBA AmeriCup.

He also played at the 1999 Pan American Games and the 2003 Pan American Games.

== Executive career ==
Barrett is currently Executive Vice President and General Manager of Canada Basketball.

== Personal life ==
Barrett was born in Scarborough, Toronto and is of Jamaican descent.

Barrett's wife, Kesha Duhaney, is a native of Brooklyn, New York. She was a nationally ranked sprinter and long jumper for St. John's University before working for the Canadian Imperial Bank of Commerce. The couple first met while attending St. John's.

The Barretts had two children together, of which one survives.

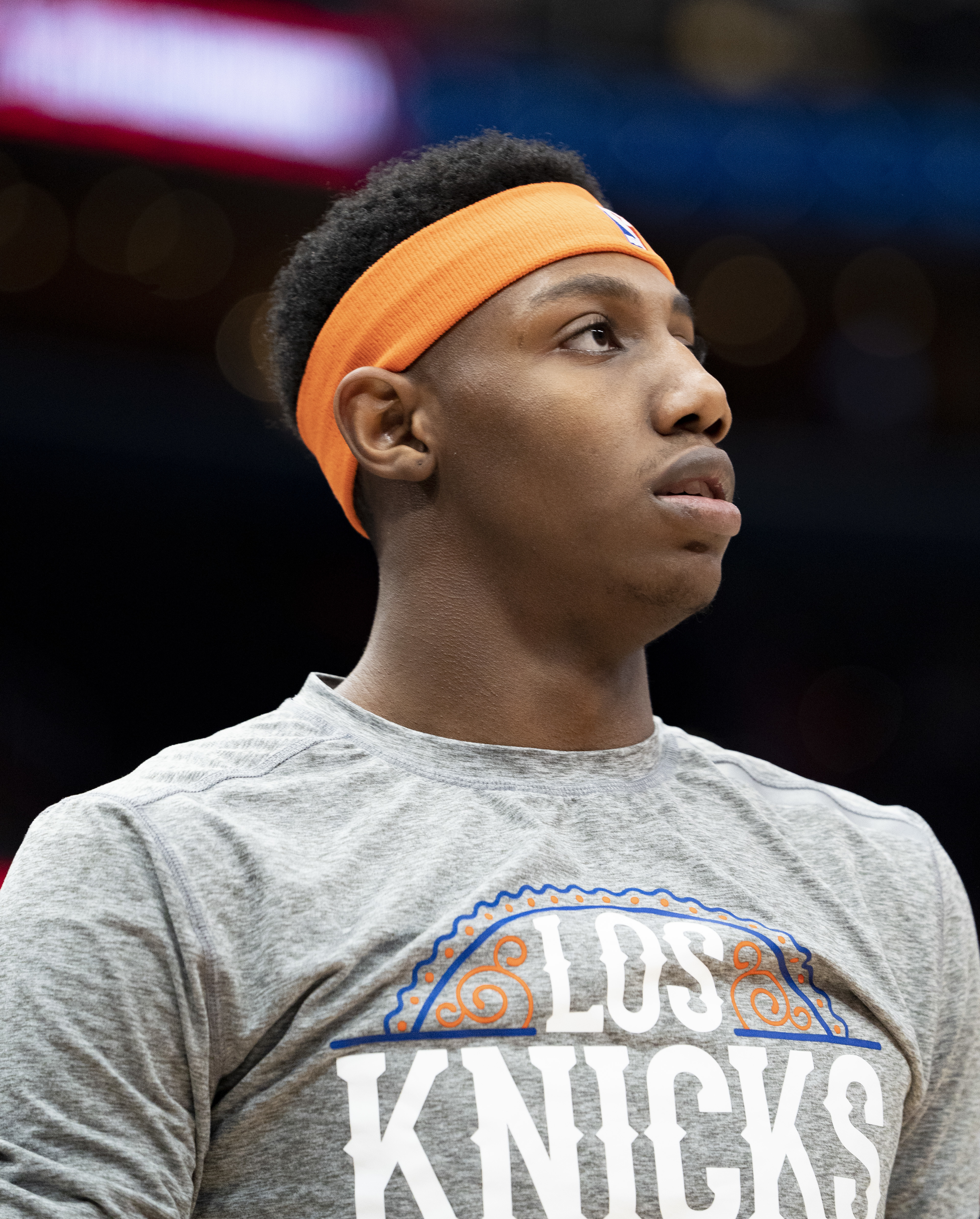
Barrett's son, Rowan Alexander "RJ" Barrett, Jr.

Their older son, Rowan Jr., better known as RJ Barrett, was ranked as the number one high-school basketball player in the class of 2018, and enrolled at Duke University for a year before being selected 3rd overall by the New York Knicks in the 2019 NBA draft. He was later traded to the Toronto Raptors, where he became a star.

The Barretts' younger son, Nathan, died tragically in 2024 several weeks after contracting an illness which ultimately took his life. The illness was not publicly identified.
