= Petar Naumoski =

Macedonian basketball player

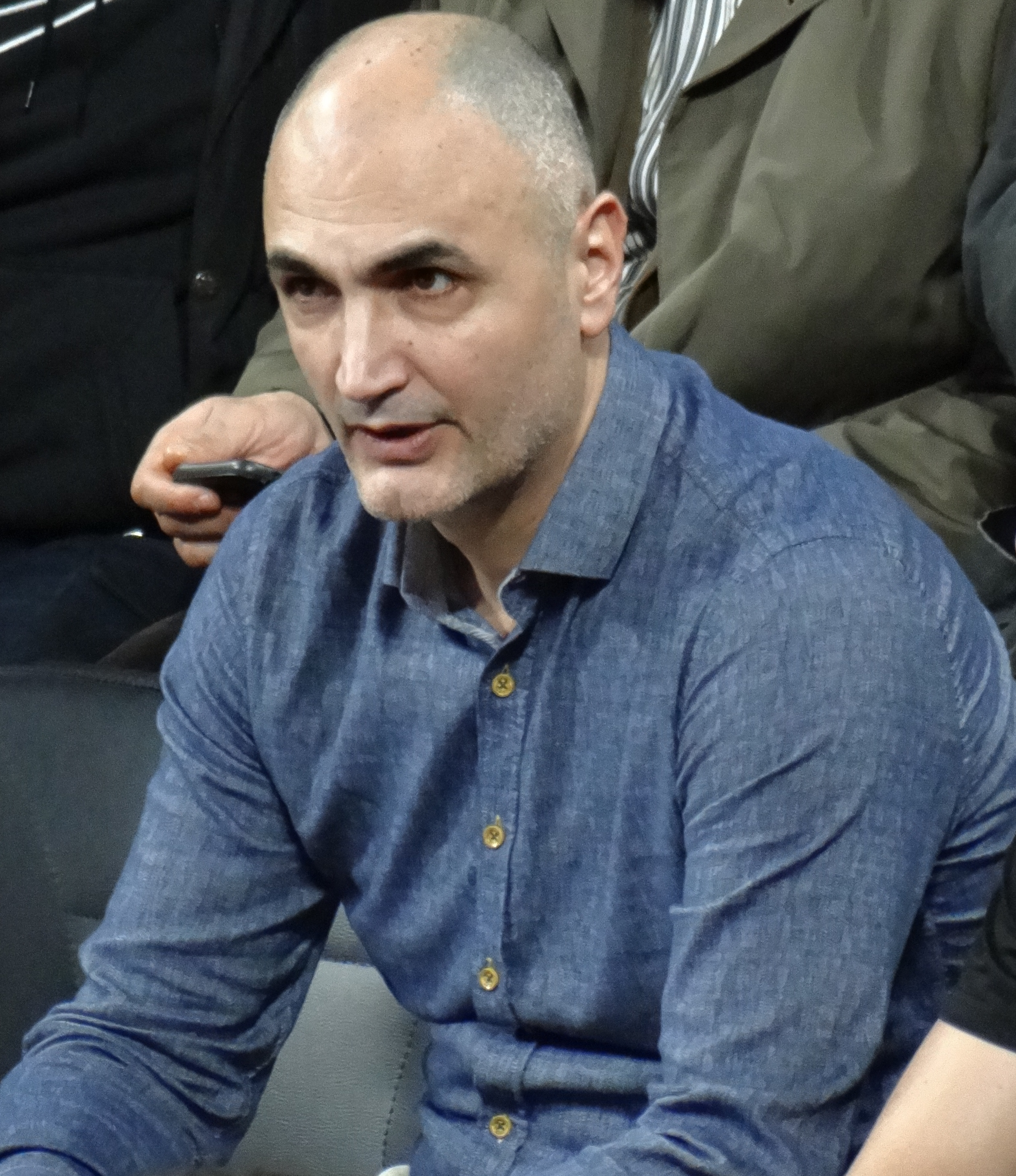
- Naumoski in 2018.

Personal information
- Born: 27 August 1968 (age 58) Prilep, SR Macedonia, SFR Yugoslavia
- Listed height: 6 ft 4.75 in (1.95 m)
- Listed weight: 210 lb (95 kg)

Career information
- Playing career: 1989–2011
- Position: Point guard / shooting guard
- Number: 7

Career history
- 1989–1991: Jugoplastika / POP 84 Split
- 1991–1992: Rabotnički
- 1992–1994: Efes Pilsen
- 1994–1995: Benetton Treviso
- 1995–1999: Efes Pilsen
- 2000–2001: Benetton Treviso
- 2002: Montepaschi Siena
- 2002–2004: Olimpia Milano
- 2004: Ülkerspor
- 2008: Guido Rossi
- 2008–2009: Derthona Basket
- 2009: Guido Rossi
- 2010–2011: MZT Skopje

Career highlights
- 2× EuroLeague champion (1990, 1991); FIBA European Selection (1996); 3× FIBA EuroStar (1996–1998); 2× FIBA Saporta Cup champion (1995, 2002); FIBA Saporta Cup Finals MVP (2002); 2× FIBA Saporta Cup Finals Top Scorer (1995, 2002); FIBA Korać Cup champion (1996); Italian Cup winner (1995); 2× Yugoslavian League champion (1990, 1991); 2× Yugoslavian Cup winner (1990, 1991); 4× Turkish League champion (1993, 1994, 1996, 1997); 5× Turkish Supercup winner (1992, 1993, 1996, 1998, 2004); 5× Turkish Cup winner (1994, 1996–1998, 2004); No. 7 retired by Efes (2017)

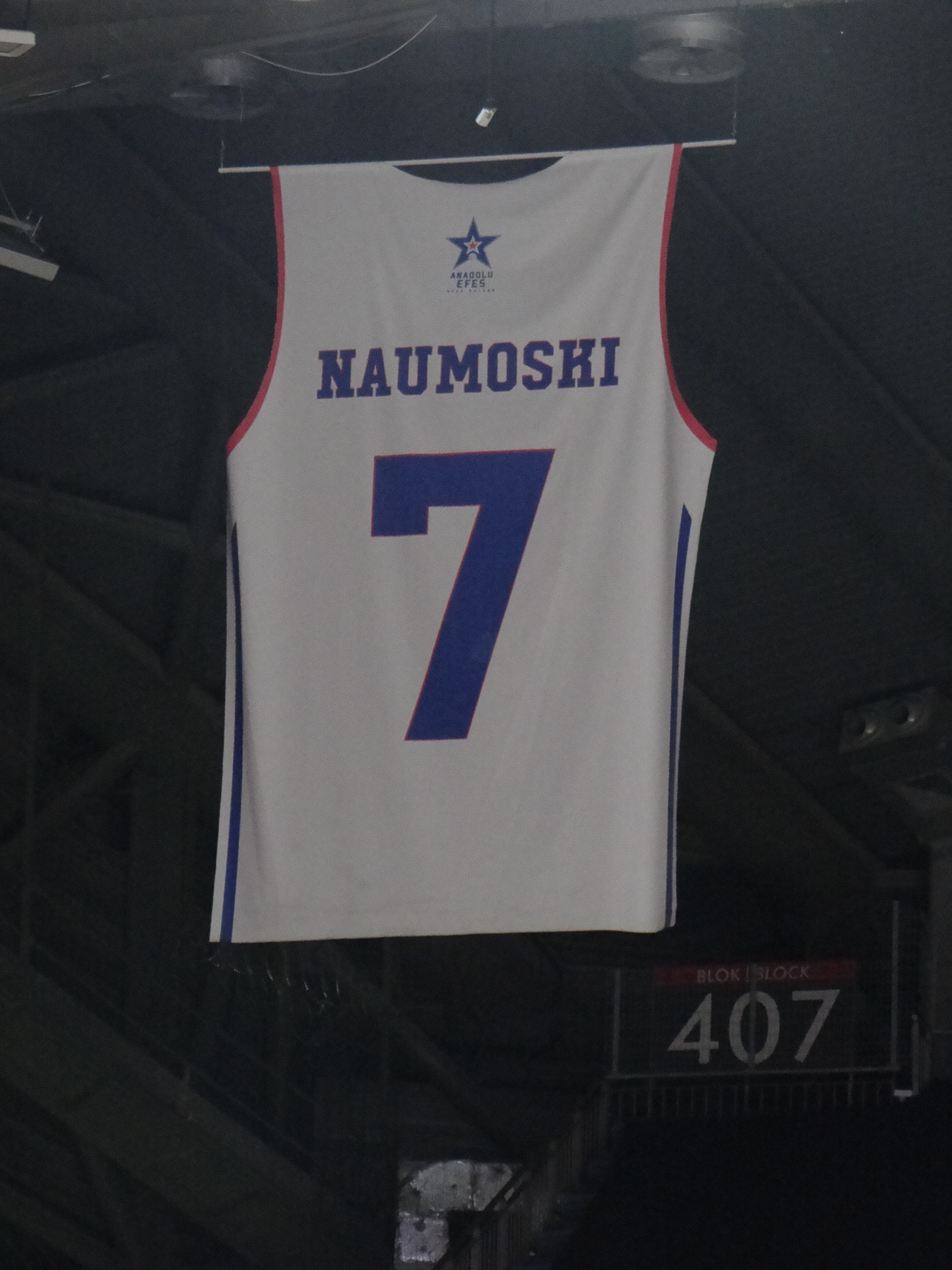
Naumoski's retired #7 Efes jersey.

Petar "Pece" Naumoski (Macedonian: Петар "Пеце" Наумоски; born 27 August 1968) is a former Macedonian professional basketball player. At a height of 1.95 m (6'4 3/4") tall, and a weight of 95 kg (210 lbs.). He played mainly at the point guard position during his career, but he could also play as a shooting guard and a small forward. He was a very skillful play maker. In his pro playing career, he had some quite successful years, while playing in Turkey and Italy.

== Professional career ==
In his career, Naumoski won all of the 3 different European-wide professional club basketball leagues that existed while he was playing. He won the championship of the top-tier level European-wide league, the EuroLeague, two times. With the Yugoslavian League club Split, in the 1989–90 season, and the 1990–91 season.

He also won the championship of the secondary level European-wide league, the FIBA Saporta Cup, with the Italian League club Treviso Basket, in the 1994–95 season. He won the Saporta Cup again, with the Italian club Mens Sana Basket, in the 2001–02 season. In addition, he also won the championship of the third-tier level European-wide league, the FIBA Korać Cup, with the Turkish Super League club Efes, in the 1995–96 season.

He was a member of the FIBA European Selection in 1996. He was also a three time FIBA EuroStar, in the years 1996, 1997, and 1998.

== National team career ==
Naumoski was a member of the senior men's Macedonian national basketball team. With Macedonia, he played at the 1999 EuroBasket.

== Post-playing career ==
Naumoski once served as the Sport Minister of the Republic of North Macedonia. In June 2007, some Turkish newspapers claimed that Efes Pilsen was considering Naumoski to be their new head basketball coach of the club, to replace Oktay Mahmuti. However, the Turkish club ultimately opted to hire David Blatt instead.

On 27 April 2015, he was named the President of the Basketball Federation of Macedonia. On 9 February 2017, Efes retired his number 7 jersey.

== Personal life ==
Naumoski also has a Turkish passport, under the name of Namık Polat, as well as Italian citizenship. He has a strong friendship with Nikola Danev and Tane Dimovski, who are also his teammates in basketball.

== Awards and honours ==
- With Jugoplastika/POP 84 Split
  - 2× Yugoslavian Cup Winner: (1990, 1991)
  - 2× FIBA European Champions Cup (EuroLeague) Champion: (1990, 1991)
  - 2× Yugoslavian Federal League Champion: (1990, 1991)
- With Efes Pilsen
  - 4× Turkish President's Cup (Turkish Supercup) Winner: (1992, 1993, 1996, 1998)
  - FIBA European Cup Runner-up: (1993)
  - 4× Turkish Super League Champion: (1993, 1994, 1996, 1997)
  - 4× Turkish Cup Winner: (1994, 1996, 1997, 1998)
  - FIBA Korać Cup Champion: (1996)
- With Benetton Treviso
  - Italian Cup Winner: (1995)
  - FIBA European Cup Champion: (1995)
- With Montepaschi Siena
  - FIBA Saporta Cup Champion: (2002)
- With Ülkerspor
  - Turkish Cup Winner: (2004)
  - Turkish President's Cup (Turkish Supercup) Winner: (2004)
- With MZT Skopje
  - Macedonian Cup Runner-up: (2011)
