= Henry Williams (basketball) =

American basketball player (1970–2018)

Personal information
- Born: June 6, 1970 Indianapolis, Indiana, U.S.
- Died: March 13, 2018 (aged 47) Charlotte, North Carolina, U.S.
- Listed height: 6 ft 3 in (1.91 m)
- Listed weight: 185 lb (84 kg)

Career information
- High school: Ben Davis (Indianapolis, Indiana)
- College: Charlotte (1988–1992)
- NBA draft: 1992: 2nd round, 44th overall pick
- Drafted by: San Antonio Spurs
- Playing career: 1992–2002
- Position: Shooting guard

Career history
- 1992–1993: Wichita Falls Texans
- 1993–1995: Scaligera Verona
- 1995–1999: Benetton Treviso
- 1999–2000: Virtus Roma
- 2000–2001: Scaligera Verona
- 2002: Basket Napoli

Career highlights
- FIBA Saporta Cup champion (1999); FIBA Saporta Cup Finals MVP (1999); FIBA Saporta Cup Finals Top Scorer (1999); Italian League champion (1997); Italian Supercup winner (1997); Italian League MVP (1996); 5x Italian All-Star (1993, 1996, 1997, 1997, 1999); First-team All-Metro Conference (1992); No. 34 retired by UNC Charlotte 49ers
- Stats at Basketball Reference
Medals
Men's basketball
Representing United States
FIBA World Cup
Bronze medal – third place	1990 Buenos Aires
Goodwill Games
Silver medal – second place	1990 Seattle

Henry Williams (June 6, 1970 – March 13, 2018), nicknamed, "Hi-Fly", was an American professional basketball player.

== College career ==
Williams played college basketball for UNC Charlotte, under head coach Jeff Mullins, from 1988 through 1992. From his four years with the Charlotte 49ers, Williams remains the 49ers' all-time leading scorer, with 2,383 points. The school has also retired his number 34 jersey. He helped lead the 49ers to the 1992 NCAA Tournament, and to a 1989 NIT berth.

== Professional career ==
Williams was drafted in the second round (44th overall), in the 1992 NBA draft, by the San Antonio Spurs, but he never played in the NBA for the team. He spent the majority of his professional career in Europe. During his 10-year overseas career, Williams played for Italian teams Scaligera Verona, Treviso, and Roma, winning an Italian League championship in 1997, coached by Mike D'Antoni and posting a career scoring average in the Italian League, of 21.7 points per game. He was the Italian League MVP in 1996 and he won the 1998–99 FIBA Saporta Cup, being chosen as FIBA Saporta Cup Finals MVP. During his long Italian stay, Williams was nicknamed "Hi-Fly" and "Sprite of Indianapolis" and became the favorite of Verona and Treviso supporters.

== National team career ==
Williams was a member of the senior Team USA national basketball team. With Team USA, he won a bronze medal at the 1990 FIBA World Cup.

== Post-playing career ==
During the 2004–05 NBA season, Williams was the Charlotte Bobcats' additional on-air talent.

He was the pastor of New Zion Missionary Church in Charlotte, North Carolina. Williams died on March 13, 2018, of kidney disease.
