= Zam Fredrick =

American basketball player

Personal information
- Born: August 17, 1959 (age 67) Calhoun County, South Carolina, U.S.
- Listed height: 6 ft 2 in (1.88 m)
- Listed weight: 180 lb (82 kg)

Career information
- High school: St. Matthews (St. Matthews, South Carolina)
- College: South Carolina (1977–1981)
- NBA draft: 1981: 3rd round, 51st overall pick
- Drafted by: Los Angeles Lakers
- Playing career: 1981–1987
- Position: Shooting guard
- Number: 20

Career history
- 1981–1983: Virtus Pallacanestro Bologna
- 1984–1987: Scavolini Pesaro

Career highlights
- Italian League Top Scorer (1982); Italian Cup winner (1985); FIBA Saporta Cup Finals Top Scorer (1986); NCAA scoring champion (1981)
- Stats at Basketball Reference

Zambolist "Zam" Fredrick Sr. (born August 17, 1959) is a retired American professional basketball player. He spent his professional career playing in Italy, from 1981 to 1987, after graduating college from the University of South Carolina, in 1981. Although Fredrick played in Europe, he is best known in the United States for leading NCAA Division I in scoring, as a senior, in 1980–81, with a 28.9 points per game average.

== College career ==
Fredrick grew up in South Carolina. He played college basketball at South Carolina (UofSC), under head coaches Frank McGuire and Bill Foster, between 1977 and 1981. The 781 total points he scored during his senior season is second all-time in school history, to Grady Wallace's 906, who, coincidentally, also led the nation in scoring in 1956–57.

== Professional playing career ==
Despite being selected by the Los Angeles Lakers, in the 1981 NBA draft (third round, 51st overall), Fredrick never played in the NBA. he was the Italian League Top Scorer in 1982, and the FIBA Saporta Cup Finals Top Scorer, in 1986.

== Coaching career ==
After his decade-long professional career in Europe, Fredrick came back to the US, and coached high school basketball at Calhoun County High School (CCHS), in St. Matthews, South Carolina. During one seven-year stretch, Fredrick led CCHS to five state championships, and a winning streak of 81 games. His son, Zam Fredrick Jr., was a member of three of those. His son also scored a South Carolina state record 3,481 points, and had played on the varsity team since 8th grade. Fredrick Sr. is still a coach at CCHS to this day.

== See also ==
- List of NCAA Division I men's basketball season scoring leaders
