= Branislav Prelević =

Serbian basketball player and coach (born 1966)

Bane Prelević
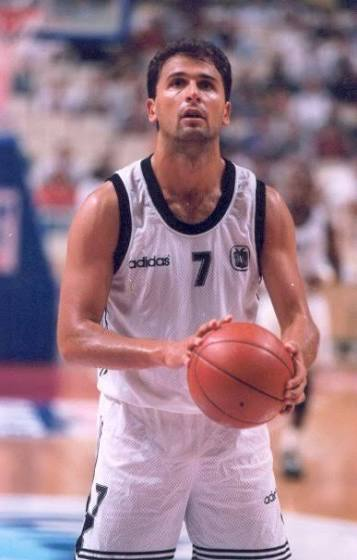
- Bane Prelevic in 1996

Personal information
- Born: 19 December 1966 (age 59) Belgrade, SR Serbia, SFR Yugoslavia
- Listed height: 6 ft 4.5 in (1.94 m)
- Listed weight: 220 lb (100 kg)

Career information
- NBA draft: 1988: undrafted
- Playing career: 1986–2000
- Position: Shooting guard
- Number: 7, 8
- Coaching career: 2001–2008

Career history

Playing
- 1986–1988: Crvena zvezda
- 1988–1996: PAOK
- 1996–1997: Kinder Bologna
- 1997–1999: AEK
- 1999–2000: PAOK

Coaching
- 2001–2002: PAOK (assistant)
- 2002–2005: PAOK
- 2007–2008: Ionikos Lamias

Career highlights
- As player: FIBA Saporta Cup champion (1991); FIBA Saporta Cup Top Scorer (1992); 3× FIBA Saporta Cup Finals Top Scorer (1991, 1992, 1996); FIBA Korać Cup champion (1994); Greek League champion (1992); Greek Cup winner (1995); Greek Cup Finals MVP (1995); Greek Cup Top Scorer (1995); No. 7 retired by PAOK; 3× Greek League All-Star (1991, 1994 II, 1996 I); Italian Cup winner (1997); Italian Cup MVP (1997)
Medals
Men's basketball
Representing Yugoslavia
FIBA Europe U16 Championship
Gold medal – first place	1983 West Germany	Under-16

Branislav Prelević (Serbian Cyrillic: Бранислав Прелевић, Greek: Μπράνισλαβ Πρέλεβιτς; born 19 December 1966) is a retired Serbian professional basketball player and coach. He is commonly referred to by his nickname Bane (Serbian Cyrillic: Бане, Greek: Μπάνε).

== Personal information ==
Prelević was born to ethnic Serb parents in Belgrade, SR Serbia, Yugoslavia. He holds both Serbian and Greek citizenship. His family originated from the Bjelopavlići/Palabardhi clan. His maternal great grandfather was born in Eratyra and he had the surname Alvanos literally meaning "Albanian" in Greek.

He is married to Nevena Prelević-Marjanović (born 26 April 1967, daughter of legendary Yugoslavian and Serbian pop singer Đorđe Marjanović), and he has two children, named Anna and Tea. Anna was elected Miss Greece in 2010, and she represented Greece at Miss Universe 2010.

== Professional playing career ==
=== Red Star Belgrade ===
Prelević started his career with Crvena zvezda (Red Star Belgrade).

=== PAOK Thessaloniki ===
In 1988, at age 21, Prelević moved to Greece in order to be able to play for PAOK Thessaloniki, where he spent eight seasons.

Then 21-year-old Prelević debuted in the 1988–89 season. He became the definitive leader and a fan favorite, often compared to the great Nikos Galis, who was at the time the captain of Aris. Prelević was often quoted for his loyalty to the team. He had a number of injuries and medical emergencies because of weak legs, but he would constantly choose to take heavy dosages of painkillers, rather than missing out on any important games.

While playing with PAOK, Prelević won the FIBA European Cup Winners' Cup, when PAOK defeated CAI Zaragoza in Geneva, by a score of 76–72 on 26 March 1991.

The next season, Prelević was again the leader of PAOK, and the team reached the FIBA European Cup Winners' Cup final again, but they lost to Real Madrid, by a score of 63–65. In the same season, PAOK won the Greek League championship, beating out Olympiacos.

Prelević participated in the EuroLeague for the first time, in the 1992–93 season, and managed to reach the Athens 1993 EuroLeague Final Four. PAOK lost in the semifinal game to Benetton Treviso, which was led by superstar Toni Kukoč, by a score of 77–79.

In 1994, Prelević and PAOK returned to European-wide success by winning the FIBA Korać Cup two-leg final against Stefanel Trieste, winning both at home and away by 9 points. The following year, PAOK won the Greek Cup, in a 19-point victory against Panionios, by a score of 72–53. In 1996, he was a FIBA European Cup finalist.

=== Virtus Bologna ===
In 1996, Prelević moved to Italy to play with Virtus Bologna (called Kinder Bologna at the time for sponsorship reasons).

=== AEK Athens ===
In 1997, Prelević returned to Greece and played with AEK Athens. Prelević reached the EuroLeague Final Four in Barcelona in 1998, where his team beat Benetton Treviso in the semis, by a score of 69–66, before losing in the final to Kinder Bologna, by a score of 44–58. In 1998 and 1999, Prelević was a Greek Cup finalist.

=== Return to PAOK Thessaloniki ===
In 1999, Prelević returned to PAOK, and he then quit playing professional basketball at the end of the season.

== National team career ==
In 1983, Prelević was part of the Yugoslavia Under-16 national team that won the gold medal at the 1983 FIBA Europe Under-16 Championship in Germany. That team included, alongside Prelević, players such as Žarko Paspalj, Jure Zdovc, Luka Pavićević, Ivo Nakić, and Miroslav Pecarski. He was selected to compete FR Yugoslavia national team at the 1992 Olympic Tournament, but Yugoslavia's participation eventually suspended due to the Yugoslav War.

== Post-playing career ==
Prelević later returned to PAOK in the 2001–02 season, as an assistant basketball coach. He was then the head coach of PAOK, from 2002 to 2005. He then went on to become the President of the club, from 2011 until 2019.

== Honors and awards ==
- PAOK:
  - Greek League Champion: (1992)
  - Greek Cup Winner: (1995)
  - 3× Greek League All-Star: (1991, 1994 II, 1996 I)
  - FIBA Saporta Cup (European Cup Winners' Cup) Champion: (1991)
  - FIBA Saporta Cup Top Scorer: (1992)
  - 3× FIBA Saporta Cup Finals Top Scorer: (1991, 1992, 1996)
  - FIBA Korać Cup Champion: (1994)
- Virtus Bologna:
  - Italian Cup Winner: (1997)
