= FIBA Saporta Cup Finals MVP =

Eurpoean basketball award

The FIBA Saporta Cup Finals MVP was an annual award that was given by the European-wide second-tier level professional club basketball competition, the FIBA Saporta Cup. It was given to the Most Valuable Player (MVP) of each season's FIBA Saporta Cup Finals.

== FIBA Saporta Cup Finals MVPs ==
From the FIBA Saporta Cup 1995–96 season, to the 2001–02 season, an MVP of the FIBA Saporta Cup Finals was chosen.

*	Member of the Naismith Memorial Basketball Hall of Fame
**	Member of the FIBA Hall of Fame
***	Member of both the Naismith and FIBA Halls of Fame

Season	Player	Pos.	Nationality	Club	Ref.
1995–96	Ramón Rivas	PF/C	Puerto Rico; Spain	(Spain) Saski Baskonia	
1996–97	Alberto Herreros	SF	Spain	(Spain) Real Madrid	
1997–98	Saulius Štombergas	SF	Lithuania	(Lithuania) Žalgiris Kaunas	
1998–99	Henry Williams	SG	United States	(Italy) Treviso Basket	
1999–00	Anthony Bowie	SG/SF	United States	(Greece) AEK Athens	
2000–01	Jimmy Oliver	SG/SF	United States	(Greece) Maroussi	
2001–02	Petar Naumoski	PG/SG	North Macedonia	(Italy) Mens Sana Siena	

== See also ==
- FIBA Saporta Cup
- FIBA Saporta Cup Finals
- FIBA Saporta Cup Finals Top scorer
- FIBA Saporta Cup Top scorer
- FIBA Saporta Cup Records
- FIBA Festivals
- FIBA EuroStars
