= 1998–99 FIBA Saporta Cup =

- League: FIBA Saporta Cup
- Sport: Basketball

Final
- Champions: (Italy) Benetton Treviso
- Runners-up: (Spain) Pamesa Valencia
- Finals MVP: (United States) Henry Williams

FIBA Saporta Cup seasons
- ← 1997–98 1999–00 →

The 1998–99 FIBA Saporta Cup was the thirty-third edition of FIBA's 2nd-tier level European-wide professional club basketball competition. It occurred between September 15, 1998, and April 13, 1999. The final was held at Zaragoza, Spain.

== Competition system ==
- 48 teams (national domestic cup champions, plus the best qualified teams from the most important European national domestic leagues), entered a preliminary group stage, divided into eight groups of six teams each, and played a round-robin. The final standings were based on individual wins and defeats. In the case of a tie between two or more teams, after the group stage, the following criteria were used to decide the final classification: 1) number of wins in one-to-one games between the teams; 2) basket average between the teams; 3) general basket average within the group.
- The top four teams from each group qualified for a 1/16 Final Playoff (X-pairings, home and away games), where the winners advanced further to 1/8 Finals, 1/4 Finals, and 1/2 Final.
- The Final was played at a predetermined venue.

== Country ranking ==
For the 1998–1999 FIBA Saporta Cup, the countries are allocated places according to their place on the FIBA country rankings, which takes into account their performance in European competitions from 1995–96 to 1997–98.

Country ranking for 1998–1999 FIBA Saporta Cup

Rank	Country	Points	Teams	Notes
1	Greece	237.000	2	
2	Italy	222.833	2	
3	Spain	194.500	2	
4	Turkey	92.833	2	
5	France	88.667	2	
6	Russia	67.732	2	
7	Yugoslavia	46.333	2	
8	Germany	38.500	2	
9	Croatia	35.542	2	
10	Lithuania	34.667	2	
11	Slovenia	33.714	2	
12	Israel	31.902	2	
13	Poland	21.524	2	
14	Portugal	19.794	2	
15	Belgium	15.929	2	
16	Ukraine	8.905	2	-1, Budivelnyk withdrew
17	Macedonia	6.542	1	
18	Hungary	6.429	1	+1, Atomerőmű got wild card
19	Austria	5.417	1	+1, Stahlbau Oberwart got wild card

Rank	Country	Points	Teams	Notes
20	Czech Republic	4.187	1	
21	Cyprus	4.083	1	
22	Slovakia	3.944	1	
23	Sweden	3.667	1	
24	England	3.611	1	-1, London Leopards withdrew
25	Bulgaria	3.361	1	
26	Finland	2.361	1	
27	Netherlands	1.889	1	
28	Bosnia and Herzegovina	1.722	1	+1, Bosna got wild card
29	Latvia	1.445	1	+1, Ventspils got wild card
30	Estonia	1.333	1	
31	Romania	1.056	1	-1,-Dinamo București withdrew
32	Luxembourg	0.889	1	-1, Racing Luxembourg withdrew
33	Albania	0.694	0	
34	Georgia	0.416	0	
35	Switzerland	0.278	0	
36	Denmark	0.111	0	
37	Belarus	0.056	0	
38	Moldova	0.056	0	

== Team allocation ==
The labels in the parentheses show how each team qualified for the place of its starting round:

- 1st, 2nd, 3rd, 4th, 5th, etc.: League position after eventual Playoffs
- CW: Cup winners
- WC: Wild card

Regular season
(Greece) AEK (4th)	(Federal Republic of Yugoslavia) Partizan Zepter (3rd)	(Poland) Śląsk Wrocław (1st)	(Latvia) ASK Brocēni (1st)
(Greece) Aris (CW)	(Federal Republic of Yugoslavia) Budućnost (CW)	(Poland) Mazowszanka (CW)	(Latvia) Ventspils (WC)
(Italy) Benetton Treviso (5th)	(Germany) Ratiopharm Ulm (2nd)	(Portugal) Estrelas da Avenida (1st)	(Ukraine) BIPA-Moda Odesa (1st)
(Italy) Sony Milano (9th)	(Germany) TVG Trier (CW)	(Portugal) Ovarense Aerosoles (2nd)	(North Macedonia) MZT Boss Skopje (2nd)
(Spain) Pinturas Bruguer Badalona (6th)	(Croatia) Zagreb (3rd)	(Belgium) Spirou Charleroi (1st)	(Czech Republic) Mlékárna Kunín (2nd)
(Spain) Pamesa Valencia (CW)	(Croatia) Split (4th)	(Belgium) Telindus Racing Antwerpen (2nd)	(Cyprus) APOEL (1st)
(Turkey) Tofaş (4th)	(Lithuania) Atletas (2nd)	(Hungary) Marc Körmend (CW)	(Slovakia) Slovakofarma Pezinok (1st)
(Turkey) Türk Telekom (6th)	(Lithuania) Lietuvos rytas (3rd)	(Hungary) Atomerőmű (WC)	(Sweden) Plannja Basket (2nd)
(France) Limoges CSP (2nd)	(Slovenia) Kovinotehna Savinjska Polzela (2nd)	(Austria) UKJ SÜBA Sankt Pölten (1st)	(Bulgaria) Cherno More (1st)
(France) Cholet (CW)	(Slovenia) Pivovarna Laško (3rd)	(Austria) UBC Stahlbau Oberwart (WC)	(Finland) Torpan Pojat (1st)
(Russia) Spartak Moscow (4th)	(Israel) Hapoel Eilat (2nd)	(Bosnia and Herzegovina) Feal Široki (1st)	(Netherlands) Den Helder (1st)
(Russia) UNICS (5th)	(Israel) Hapoel Jerusalem (4th)	(Bosnia and Herzegovina) Bosna (WC)	(Estonia) Kalev Tallinn (1st)

== Preliminary group stage ==
Key to colors
Qualified to Round of 32
Eliminated

=== Group A ===
	Team	Pld	Pts	W	L	PF	PA	PD
1.	(Italy) Sony Milano	10	17	7	3	751	693	+58
2.	(Estonia) Kalev	10	16	6	4	764	699	+65
3.	(Slovenia) Kovinotehna Savinjska Polzela	10	16	6	4	705	709	−4
4.	(Portugal) Estrelas da Avenida	10	15	5	5	730	737	−7
5.	(Bulgaria) Cherno More	10	13	3	7	755	807	−52
6.	(Lithuania) Atletas	10	13	3	7	709	769	−60

=== Group B ===
	Team	Pld	Pts	W	L	PF	PA	PD
1.	(France) Cholet	10	18	8	2	815	675	+140
2.	(Turkey) Türk Telekom	10	17	7	3	768	722	+46
3.	(Croatia) Split	10	15	5	5	800	760	+40
4.	(Slovakia) Slovakofarma Pezinok	10	15	5	5	759	771	−12
5.	(North Macedonia) MZT Boss Skopje	10	13	3	7	738	805	−67
6.	(Czech Republic) Mlékárna Kunín	10	12	2	8	755	902	−147

=== Group C ===
	Team	Pld	Pts	W	L	PF	PA	PD
1.	(Spain) Pamesa Valencia	10	20	10	0	805	678	+117
2.	(Federal Republic of Yugoslavia) Budućnost	10	16	6	4	780	767	+13
3.	(Poland) Śląsk Wrocław	10	15	5	5	729	706	+23
4.	(Latvia) ASK Brocēni	10	15	5	5	798	815	−17
5.	(Austria) SÜBA Sankt Pölten	10	12	2	8	701	768	−67
6.	(Israel) Hapoel Eilat	10	12	2	8	771	850	−79

=== Group D ===
	Team	Pld	Pts	W	L	PF	PA	PD
1.	(Federal Republic of Yugoslavia) Partizan Zepter	10	19	9	1	850	744	+106
2.	(Slovenia) Pivovarna Laško	10	17	7	3	836	803	+33
3.	(Greece) AEK	10	17	7	3	757	695	+62
4.	(Hungary) Atomerőmű	10	13	3	7	758	816	−58
5.	(Croatia) Zagreb	10	13	3	7	701	780	−79
6.	(Finland) Torpan Pojat	10	11	1	9	727	791	−64

=== Group E ===
	Team	Pld	Pts	W	L	PF	PA	PD
1.	(Turkey) Tofaş	10	17	7	3	774	650	+124
2.	(Israel) Hapoel Jerusalem	10	17	7	3	770	707	+63
3.	(Belgium) Spirou Charleroi	10	17	7	3	680	682	−2
4.	(Lithuania) Lietuvos rytas	10	16	6	4	757	776	−19
5.	(Hungary) Marc Körmend	10	12	2	8	723	841	−118
6.	(Bosnia and Herzegovina) Bosna	10	11	1	9	672	720	−48

=== Group F ===
	Team	Pld	Pts	W	L	PF	PA	PD
1.	(Greece) Aris	10	19	9	1	799	637	+162
2.	(France) Limoges CSP	10	17	7	3	711	637	+74
3.	(Belgium) Telindus Racing Antwerpen	10	15	5	5	708	736	−28
4.	(Germany) TVG Trier	10	14	4	6	741	781	−40
5.	(Sweden) Plannja	10	13	3	7	756	802	−46
6.	(Bosnia and Herzegovina) Feal Široki	10	12	2	8	653	775	−122

=== Group G ===
	Team	Pld	Pts	W	L	PF	PA	PD
1.	(Spain) Pinturas Bruguer Badalona	10	19	9	1	855	703	+152
2.	(Germany) Ratiopharm Ulm	10	17	7	3	775	759	+16
3.	(Latvia) Ventspils	10	15	5	5	860	813	+47
4.	(Poland) Mazowszanka	10	14	4	6	751	783	−32
5.	(Cyprus) APOEL	10	13	3	7	689	736	−47
6.	(Russia) Spartak Moscow	10	12	2	8	770	906	−136

=== Group H ===
	Team	Pld	Pts	W	L	PF	PA	PD
1.	(Italy) Benetton Treviso	10	20	10	0	822	644	+177
2.	(Russia) UNICS	10	15	5	5	757	748	+9
3.	(Portugal) Ovarense Aerosoles	10	14	4	6	682	697	−15
4.	(Austria) Stahlbau Oberwart	10	14	4	6	691	748	−57
5.	(Netherlands) Den Helder	10	14	4	6	593	639	−46
6.	(Ukraine) BIPA-Moda Odesa	10	12	3	7	655	724	−69

== Round of 32 ==
Team 1	Agg.	Team 2	1st leg	2nd leg
Slovakofarma Pezinok (Slovakia)	161–152	(Italy) Sony Milano	89–77	72–75
Split (Croatia)	152–139	(Estonia) Kalev	83–77	69–62
Kovinotehna Savinjska Polzela (Slovenia)	123–141	(Turkey) Türk Telekom	70–64	53–77
Estrelas da Avenida (Portugal)	114–159	(France) Cholet	59–75	55–84
Atomerőmű (Hungary)	133–153	(Spain) Pamesa Valencia	70–71	63–82
AEK (Greece)	129–135	(Federal Republic of Yugoslavia) Budućnost	66–61	63–74
Śląsk Wrocław (Poland)	149–153	(Slovenia) Pivovarna Laško	81–82	68–71
ASK Brocēni (Latvia)	173–184	(Federal Republic of Yugoslavia) Partizan Zepter	84–97	89–87
Trier (Germany)	140–172	(Turkey) Tofaş	70–92	70–80
Telindus Racing Antwerpen (Belgium)	133–158	(Israel) Hapoel Jerusalem	67–64	66–94
Spirou Charleroi (Belgium)	136–130	(France) Limoges CSP	60–61	76–69
Lietuvos rytas (Lithuania)	149–161	(Greece) Aris	77–76	72–85
Stahlbau Oberwart (Austria)	130–187	(Spain) Pinturas Bruguer Badalona	66–92	64–95
Ovarense Aerosoles (Portugal)	129–141	(Germany) Ratiopharm Ulm	66–62	63–79
Ventspils (Latvia)	167–147	(Russia) UNICS	88–73	79–74
Mazowzanka (Poland)	130–145	(Italy) Benetton Treviso	70–62	60–83

== Round of 16 ==
Team 1	Agg.	Team 2	1st leg	2nd leg
Budućnost (Federal Republic of Yugoslavia)	171–149	(Slovakia) Slovakofarma Pezinok	86–68	85–81
Pivovarna Laško (Slovenia)	159–154	(France) Cholet	77–68	82–86
Split (Croatia)	151–163	(Spain) Pamesa Valencia	76–79	75–84
Türk Telekom (Turkey)	113–161	(Federal Republic of Yugoslavia) Partizan Zepter	70–85	43–76
Ratiopharm Ulm (Germany)	135–153	(Turkey) Tofaş	65–74	70–79
Ventspils (Latvia)	137–144	(Greece) Aris	73–65	64–79
Hapoel Jerusalem (Israel)	155–166	(Spain) Pinturas Bruguer Badalona	81–73	74–93
Spirou Charleroi (Belgium)	127–145	(Italy) Benetton Treviso	66–70	61–75

== Quarterfinals ==
Team 1	Agg.	Team 2	1st leg	2nd leg
Budućnost (Federal Republic of Yugoslavia)	149–129	(Turkey) Tofaş	67–65	82–64
Aris (Greece)	158–144	(Slovenia) Pivovarna Laško	95–72	63–72
Pamesa Valencia (Spain)	123–119	(Spain) Pinturas Bruguer Badalona	57–50	66–69
Benetton Treviso (Italy)	163–150	(Federal Republic of Yugoslavia) Partizan Zepter	90–77	73–73

== Semifinals ==
Team 1	Agg.	Team 2	1st leg	2nd leg
Benetton Treviso (Italy)	96–60	(Federal Republic of Yugoslavia) Budućnost	76–60	20–0*
Pamesa Valencia (Spain)	128–114	(Greece) Aris	70–64	58–50

*The second leg which was scheduled to be played in Podgorica, was cancelled due to the war situation in Yugoslavia. Although FIBA accepted a neutral venue (Thessaloniki, Greece) to play this game, the Yugoslav players couldn't get out of their country because of the military conflict, and therefore FIBA definitely cancelled this match and awarded a forfeit (20–0) to Benetton Treviso.

== Final ==
April 13, Pabellón Príncipe Felipe, Zaragoza

Team 1	Score	Team 2
Benetton Treviso (Italy)	64–60	(Spain) Pamesa Valencia

1998–99 FIBA Saporta Cup Champions

Benetton Treviso
2nd title

== Awards ==
=== FIBA Saporta Cup Finals MVP ===
- (United States) Henry Williams ( (Italy) Benetton Treviso)

== See also ==
- 1998–99 FIBA Euroleague
- 1998–99 FIBA Korać Cup
