= MKS Znicz Basket Pruszków =

Znicz Pruszków
- Leagues: I Liga
- Founded: December 9, 1923; 101 years ago
- Arena: Hala Znicz
- Location: Pruszków, Poland
- Championships: 2 Polish Cups
- Website: www.zniczbasket.pl
Home	Away

MKS Znicz Basket Pruszków is a basketball club based in Pruszków, Poland. The team currently plays in the I Liga, the second highest division of basketball in Poland.

== Sponsorship names ==
Throughout the years, due to sponsorship, the club has been known as:

- Hoop Pekaes Pruszków (1998–2000)
- MKS Blachy (2002)
- Old Spice Pruszków (2002–2003)

== Players ==
=== Notable players ===
Note: Flags indicate national team eligibility at FIBA-sanctioned events. Players may hold other non-FIBA nationalities not displayed.

Criteria

To appear in this section a player must have either:

- Set a club record or won an individual award while at the club
- Played at least one official international match for their national team at any time
- Played at least one official NBA match at any time.

- (United States) Oliver Miller
- (Poland) Adam Wójcik
- (Poland) Cezary Trybański
