= 1994–95 FIBA European Cup =

- League: FIBA European Cup
- Sport: Basketball

Final
- Champions: (Italy) Benetton Treviso
- Runners-up: (Spain) Taugrés

FIBA European Cup seasons
- ← 1993–94 1995–96 →

The 1994–95 FIBA European Cup was the twenty-ninth edition of FIBA's 2nd-tier level European-wide professional club basketball competition. It occurred between September 6, 1994, and March 14, 1995. The final was held at the Abdi İpekçi Arena, Istanbul, Turkey. Benetton Treviso defeated Taugrés, in front of 6,000 spectators.

== Team allocation ==
The labels in the parentheses show how each team qualified for the place of its starting round:

- CW: Cup winners
- CF: Cup finalist
- 1st, 2nd, 3rd, 4th, 5th, etc.: League position after eventual Playoffs
- QR2: Loser clubs* of the second qualifying round of the FIBA European League

Third round
(Belgium) Maes Flandria (QR2)	(England) Thames Valley Tigers (QR2)	(Latvia) SWH/Brocēni (QR2)	(Switzerland) Fidefinanz Bellinzona (QR2)
Croatia Osiguranje Split (QR2)	(France) Olympique Antibes (QR2)	(Lithuania) Žalgiris (QR2)	(Ukraine) Inpromservis Kyiv (QR2)
(Cyprus) Pezoporikos-AEK Larnaca (QR2)	(Hungary) Danone Honvéd (QR2)	(Slovakia) Baník Cígeľ Prievidza (QR2)	
(Czech Republic) Bioveta COOP Banka Brno (QR2)	(Israel) Hapoel Tel Aviv (QR2)	(Sweden) Kärcher Hisings-Kärra (QR2)	
Second round
(Croatia) Zagreb (3rd)	(Greece) Iraklis Aspis Pronoia (CF)	(Portugal) Ovarense (CF)	(Turkey) Fenerbahçe (CF)
(France) SIG Strasbourg (CF)	(Israel) Hapoel Jerusalem (3rd)	(Slovenia) Kovinotehna Savinjska Polzela (CF)	
(Germany) SSV Brandt Hagen (CW)	(Italy) Benetton Treviso (CW)	(Spain) Taugres (CF)	
First round
(Albania) Vllaznia (CW)	(Cyprus) APOEL (CW)	(Lithuania) Atletas (2nd)	(Romania) Universitatea Cluj
(Austria) UKJ SÜBA Sankt Pölten (CW)	(Czech Republic) BHC SKP Pardubice (CW)	(Luxembourg) Union Sportive Hiefenech (CW)	(Russia) Avtodorozhnik (2nd)
(Belgium) Durox Leuven (CF)	(Finland) Tapiolan Honka (10th)	(North Macedonia) MZT Skopje (CF)	(Slovakia) Slovakofarma Pezinok (2nd)
(Bosnia and Herzegovina) Čelik	(Hungary) Marc-Kormend (CW)	(Netherlands) Mustang Jeans Den Helder (CW)	(Sweden) Norrkoping Dolphins (2nd)
(Bulgaria) Plama Pleven (CF)	(Latvia) Bonus (2nd)	(Poland) WTK Nobiles Wloclawek (2nd)	(Ukraine) Kyiv-Basket (2nd)

== First round ==
Team 1	Agg.	Team 2	1st leg	2nd leg
Union Sportive Hiefenech (Luxembourg)	161–177	(Slovakia) Slovakofarma Pezinok	83–96	78–81
Vllaznia (Albania)	158–170	(Romania) Universitatea Cluj	86-87	72–83
Durox Leuven (Belgium)	170–181	(Sweden) Norrköping Dolphins	85–90	85–91
Čelik (Bosnia and Herzegovina)	123–168	(Hungary) Marc Körmend	55–76	68–92
MZT Skopje (North Macedonia)	124–134	(Lithuania) Atletas	80–74	44–60
Tapiolan Honka (Finland)	123–186	(Poland) Nobiles Włocławek	81–90	82–96
SÜBA Sankt Pölten (Austria)	165–157	(Czech Republic) BHC SKP Pardubice	89–86	76–71
Bonus (Latvia)	186–167	(Russia) Avtodorozhnik	95–79	91–88
APOEL (Cyprus)	160–162	(Bulgaria) Plama Pleven	78–64	82–98
Kyiv-Basket (Ukraine)	159–152	(Netherlands) Mustang Jeans Den Helder	89–63	70–89

== Second round ==
Team 1	Agg.	Team 2	1st leg	2nd leg
Slovakofarma Pezinok (Slovakia)	151–174	(Spain) Taugrés	65–84	86–90
Universitatea Cluj (Romania)	120–171	(France) SIG Strasbourg	54-88	66–83
Norrköping Dolphins (Sweden)	157–169	(Croatia) Zagreb	83–74	74–95
Marc Körmend (Hungary)	117–148	(Greece) Iraklis Aspis Pronoia	51–60	66–88
Atletas (Lithuania)	133–138	(Israel) Hapoel Jerusalem	77–62	56–76
Nobiles Włocławek (Poland)	159–157	(Portugal) Ovarense	75–58	84–99
SÜBA Sankt Pölten (Austria)	148–210	(Turkey) Fenerbahçe	81–79	67–131
Bonus (Latvia)	156–166	(Slovenia) Kovinotehna Savinjska Polzela	89–84	67–82
Plama Pleven (Bulgaria)	153–197	(Italy) Benetton Treviso	77–87	76–110
Kyiv-Basket (Ukraine)	169–160	(Germany) Brandt Hagen	77–70	92–90

== Third round ==
- Wild card to participate in the European Cup for the Loser clubs* of the 1/16 finals of the 1994–95 FIBA European League.

*Thames Valley Tigers, Croatia Osiguranje, Budivelnyk, Žalgiris, Olympique Antibes, Bioveta Brno, Hapoel Tel Aviv, Danone Honvéd, Maes Flandria, Fidefinanz Bellinzona, Kärcher Hisings-Kärra, Pezoporikos-AEK Larnaca, SWH/Brocēni and Baník Cígeľ Prievidza.

Team 1	Agg.	Team 2	1st leg	2nd leg
Thames Valley Tigers (England)	146–148	Croatia Osiguranje	77–72	69–76
Inpromservis Kyiv (Ukraine)	186–219	(Ukraine) Kyiv-Basket	91–118	95–101
Žalgiris (Lithuania)	172–177	(Poland) Nobiles Włocławek	99–88	73–89
Zagreb (Croatia)	143–162	(France) Olympique Antibes	82–79	61–83
Bioveta COOP Banka Brno (Czech Republic)	138–165	(Israel) Hapoel Tel Aviv	72–79	66–86
Danone Honvéd (Hungary)	150–185	(Belgium) Maes Flandria	80–94	70–91
Hapoel Jerusalem (Israel)	157–161	(Spain) Taugrés	91–82	66–79
SIG Strasbourg (France)	145–149	(Switzerland) Fidefinanz Bellinzona	72–72	73–77
Kovinotehna Savinjska Polzela (Slovenia)	130–163	(Greece) Iraklis Aspis Pronoia	66–69	64–94
Fenerbahçe (Turkey)	160–157	(Sweden) Kärcher Hisings-Kärra	81–62	79–95
Pezoporikos-AEK Larnaca (Cyprus)	140–219	(Italy) Benetton Treviso	91–109	49–110
SWH/Brocēni (Latvia)	168–131	(Slovakia) Baník Cígeľ Prievidza	86–65	82–66

== Quarterfinals group stage ==
Key to colors
Qualified to semifinals
Eliminated

=== Group A ===
	Team	Pld	Pts	W	L	PF	PA	PD
1.	(France) Olympique Antibes	10	19	9	1	857	752	+105
2.	(Greece) Iraklis Aspis Pronoia	10	19	9	1	809	715	+93
3.	Croatia Osiguranje	10	15	5	5	766	731	+35
4.	(Belgium) Maes Flandria	10	14	4	6	805	807	-2
5.	(Ukraine) Kyiv-Basket	10	12	2	8	817	934	-117
6.	(Switzerland) Fidefinanz Bellinzona	10	11	1	9	669	784	-125

=== Group B ===
	Team	Pld	Pts	W	L	PF	PA	PD
1.	(Spain) Taugrés	10	19	9	1	909	840	+69
2.	(Italy) Benetton Treviso	10	18	8	2	967	843	+124
3.	(Turkey) Fenerbahçe	10	14	4	6	847	863	-16
4.	(Poland) Nobiles Włocławek	10	13	3	7	878	948	-70
5.	(Israel) Hapoel Tel Aviv	10	13	3	7	824	894	-70
6.	(Latvia) SWH Brocēni	10	13	3	7	881	918	-37

== Semifinals ==
Seeded teams played games 2 and 3 at home.

Team 1	Agg.	Team 2	1st leg	2nd leg	3rd leg
Benetton Treviso (Italy)	2–1	(France) Olympique Antibes	88–95	99–93	87-83
Iraklis Aspis Pronoia (Greece)	1–2	(Spain) Taugrés	79–78	74–79	66-70

== Final ==
March 14, Abdi İpekçi Arena, Istanbul

Team 1	Score	Team 2
Benetton Treviso (Italy)	94–86	(Spain) Taugrés

== Rosters ==
(Italy) Benetton Treviso: Petar Naumoski, Andrea Gracis, Riccardo Pittis, Orlando Woolridge, Stefano Rusconi; Maurizio Ragazzi, Massimo Iacopini (C), Alberto Vianini, Massimo R. Esposito. Coach: Mike D'Antoni
(Spain) Taugrés: Pablo Laso (C), Velimir Perasovic, Santi Abad, Kenny Green, Ramon Rivas; Ferran Lopez, Ignacio Gomez, Pedro Rodriguez, Rafael Talaveron. Coach: Manel Comas

1995–96 FIBA European Cup Champions

Benetton Treviso
1st title

== See also ==
- 1994–95 FIBA European League
- 1994-95 FIBA Korać Cup
