= 1993–94 FIBA European Cup =

- League: FIBA European Cup
- Sport: Basketball

Final
- Champions: (Slovenia) Smelt Olimpija
- Runners-up: (Spain) Taugrés

FIBA European Cup seasons
- ← 1992–93 1994–95 →

The 1993–94 FIBA European Cup was the twenty-eighth edition of FIBA's 2nd-tier level European-wide professional club basketball competition. It occurred between September 4, 1993, and March 15, 1994.

== Team allocation ==
The labels in the parentheses show how each team qualified for the place of its starting round:

- CW: Cup winners
- CF: Cup finalists
- CS: Cup semifinalists
- 1st, 2nd, 3rd, 4th, 5th, etc.: League position after eventual Playoffs
- QR2: Loser clubs* of the second qualifying round of the FIBA European League

Group stage
(Slovenia) Smelt Olimpija (QR2)			
Third round
(Austria) UKJ SÜBA Sankt Pölten (QR2)	(Czech Republic) USK Praha (QR2)	(Lithuania) Žalgiris (QR2)	(Switzerland) Fidefinanz Bellinzona (QR2)
(Bulgaria) Levski Sofia (QR2)	(Israel) Hapoel Galil Elyon (QR2)	(North Macedonia) Rabotnički (QR2)	
Croatia Osiguranje Split (QR2)	(Latvia) ASK Brocēni (QR2)	(Netherlands) Canoe Jeans EBBC (QR2)	
Second round
(Belgium) Go Pass Verviers-Pepinster (CF)	(France) Pitch Cholet (9th)	(Lithuania) Atletas (2nd)	(Russia) Spartak Saint Petersburg (2nd)
(Croatia) Zadar (CF)	(Germany) SSV Brandt Hagen (CF)	(North Macedonia) Kočani Delikates (CF)	(Slovakia) Chemosvit Svit (8th)
(Cyprus) APOEL (CW)	(Greece) Sato Aris (CF)	(Netherlands) Mustang Jeans Den Helder (2nd)	(Spain) Taugres (CS)
(Czech Republic) Bioveta COOP Banka Brno (2nd)	(Israel) Hapoel Givatayim (CF)	(Poland) WTK Nobiles Wloclawek (2nd)	(Turkey) Tofas (CW)
(Finland) Saab UU (4th)	(Italy) Olitalia Siena (CS)	(Portugal) Ovarense (CF)	(Ukraine) Bipa-Moda Odessa (CW)
First round
(Austria) Basket Flyers (2nd)	(Hungary) Kormend Hunor (CW)	(Iceland) Ungmennafélagið Snæfell (CF)	(Romania) CSA Steaua București
(Bulgaria) CSKA Sofia (CW)	(Republic of Ireland) St. Vicent's (CW)	(Luxembourg) T71 Dudelange	(Slovenia) Postojna (CF)

== First round ==
Team 1	Agg.	Team 2	1st leg	2nd leg
St. Vicent's (Republic of Ireland)	155–154	(Iceland) Ungmennafélagið Snæfell	78–75	77–79
T71 Dudelange (Luxembourg)	108–237	(Austria) Basket Flyers	70–121	38–116
Steaua București (Romania)	130–168	(Hungary) Körmend Hunor	54–71	76–97
CSKA Sofia (Bulgaria)	152–132	(Slovenia) Postojna	86–77	66–55

== Second round ==
Team 1	Agg.	Team 2	1st leg	2nd leg
St. Vicent's (Republic of Ireland)	127–174	(Netherlands) Mustang Jeans Den Helder	61–77	66–97
Atletas (Lithuania)	154–157	(Germany) Brandt Hagen	85–74	69–83
Bipa-Moda Odesa (Ukraine)	172–174	(Croatia) Zadar	83–87	89–87
Basket Flyers (Austria)	174–192	(Portugal) Ovarense	94–87	80–105
Körmend Hunor (Hungary)	154–168	(Spain) Taugrés	74–75	80–93
CSKA Sofia (Bulgaria)	131–134	(Turkey) Tofaş	67–63	64–71
Bioveta COOP Banka Brno (Czech Republic)	165–189	(Italy) Olitalia Siena	87–98	78–91
Spartak Saint Petersburg (Russia)	132–179	(Poland) Nobiles Włocławek	63–103	69–76
Chemosvit (Slovakia)	170–176	(Finland) Saab UU	81–58	89–118
Go Pass Verviers-Pepinster (Belgium)	164–178	(France) Pitch Cholet	88–81	76–97
Kočani Delikates (North Macedonia)	154–183	(Israel) Hapoel Givatayim	81–83	73–100
APOEL (Cyprus)	133–192	(Greece) Sato Aris	76–94	57–98

== Third round ==
- Wild card to participate in the European Cup for the Loser clubs* of the 1/16 finals of the 1993–94 FIBA European League.

*Canoe Jeans EBBC, Croatia Osiguranje, USK Praha, Hapoel Galil Elyon, UKJ SÜBA St. Pölten, Žalgiris, Levski Sofia, Rabotnički, ASK Brocēni and Fidefinanz Bellinzona. Smelt Olimpija entered the group stage.

Team 1	Agg.	Team 2	1st leg	2nd leg
Canoe Jeans EBBC (Netherlands)	156–172	Croatia Osiguranje	62–78	94–94
USK Praha (Czech Republic)	158–166	(Switzerland) Fidefinanz Bellinzona	75–78	83–88
Hapoel Galil Elyon (Israel)	211–140	(Austria) UKJ SÜBA St. Pölten	107–71	104–69
Žalgiris (Lithuania)	147–173	(Spain) Taugrés	76–84	71–89
Olitalia Siena (Italy)	158–159	(Turkey) Tofaş	79–72	79–87
Saab UU (Finland)	155–205	(France) Pitch Cholet	70–99	85–96
Sato Aris (Greece)	166–156	(Israel) Hapoel Givatayim	78–65	88–91
Levski Sofia (Bulgaria)	171–160	(Germany) Brandt Hagen	102–93	69–67
Zadar (Croatia)	161–138	(Poland) Nobiles Włocławek	86–60	75–78
Mustang Jeans Den Helder (Netherlands)	154–161	(North Macedonia) Rabotnički	92–76	62–85
Ovarense (Portugal)	170–166	(Latvia) ASK Brocēni	87–80	83–86

== Quarterfinals group stage ==
Key to colors
Qualified to semifinals
Eliminated

=== Group A ===
	Team	Pld	Pts	W	L	PF	PA	PD
1.	(Slovenia) Smelt Olimpija	10	18	8	2	790	718	+68
2.	(Spain) Taugrés	10	17	7	3	865	791	+74
3.	Croatia Osiguranje	10	17	7	3	861	788	+73
4.	(Switzerland) Fidefinanz Bellinzona	10	14	4	6	699	759	-60
5.	(Turkey) Tofaş	10	12	2	8	841	920	-79
6.	(North Macedonia) Rabotnički	10	12	2	8	852	932	-80

=== Group B ===
	Team	Pld	Pts	W	L	PF	PA	PD
1.	(France) Pitch Cholet	10	17	7	3	929	861	+68
2.	(Greece) Sato Aris	10	17	7	3	940	883	+57
3.	(Israel) Hapoel Galil Elyon	10	17	7	3	907	864	+43
4.	(Portugal) Ovarense	10	15	5	5	905	895	+10
5.	(Croatia) Zadar	10	13	3	7	897	894	+3
6.	(Bulgaria) Levski Sofia	10	11	1	9	827	1008	-181

== Semifinals ==
Seeded teams played games 2 and 3 at home.

Team 1	Agg.	Team 2	1st leg	2nd leg	3rd leg
Sato Aris (Greece)	1–2	(Slovenia) Smelt Olimpija	83–79	78–84	61-74
Taugrés (Spain)	2–1	(France) Pitch Cholet	81–67	90–103	90-83

== Final ==
March 15, Centre Intercommunal de Glace Malley, Lausanne

Team 1	Score	Team 2
Smelt Olimpija (Slovenia)	91–81	(Spain) Taugrés

== Rosters ==
(Slovenia) Smelt Olimpija: Jaka Daneu, Dusan Hauptman (C), Roman Horvat, Zarko Durisic, Vitaly Nosov; Marijan Kraljevic, Boris Gorenc, Marko Tusek. Coach: Zmago Sagadin
(Spain) Taugrés: Pablo Laso (C), Velimir Perasovic, Santi Abad, Ken Bannister, Ramon Rivas; Ignacio Gomez, Juan Pedro Cazorla, Rafael Talaveron. Coach: Manel Comas

1993–94 FIBA European Cup Champions

Smelt Olimpija
1st title

== See also ==
- 1993–94 FIBA European League
- 1993–94 FIBA Korać Cup
