= 1997–98 FIBA EuroCup =

- League: FIBA EuroCup
- Sport: Basketball

Final
- Champions: (Lithuania) Žalgiris
- Runners-up: (Italy) Stefanel Milano
- Finals MVP: (Lithuania) Saulius Štombergas

FIBA EuroCup seasons
- ← 1996–97 1998–99 →

The 1997–98 FIBA EuroCup was the thirty-second edition of FIBA's 2nd-tier level European-wide professional club basketball competition. it occurred between September 16, 1997, and April 14, 1998. The final was held at Pionir Hall, Belgrade, Yugoslavia. In the final, Žalgiris defeated Stefanel Milano, in front of 5,000 spectators.

== Competition system ==
- 48 teams (national domestic cup champions, plus the best qualified teams from the most important European national domestic leagues), entered a preliminary group stage, divided into eight groups of six teams each, and played a round-robin. The final standings were based on individual wins and defeats. In the case of a tie between two or more teams, after the group stage, the following criteria were used to decide the final classification: 1) number of wins in one-to-one games between the teams; 2) basket average between the teams; 3) general basket average within the group.
- The top four teams from each group qualified for a 1/16 Final Playoff (X-pairings, home and away games), where the winners advanced further to 1/8 Finals, 1/4 Finals, and 1/2 Final.
- The Final was played at a predetermined venue.

== Country ranking ==
For the 1997–1998 FIBA EuroCup, the countries are allocated places according to their place on the FIBA country rankings, which takes into account their performance in European competitions from 1994–95 to 1996–97.

Country ranking for 1997–1998 FIBA EuroCup

Rank	Country	Points	Teams	Notes
1	Spain	279.667	2	
2	Greece	275.000	2	
3	Italy	190.833	2	
4	France	117.500	2	
5	Turkey	96.667	2	
6	Russia	70.542	2	
7	Germany	55.389	2	
8	Croatia	50.833	2	
9	Israel	43.048	2	
10	Slovenia	38.833	2	
11	Yugoslavia	25.000	2	
12	Portugal	23.071	2	
13	Belgium	22.500	2	
14	Poland	21.206	2	
15	Lithuania	19.416	2	
16	Ukraine	15.762	2	
17	Hungary	9.667	1	+1, Marc-Kormend got wild card
18	Czech Republic	7.139	1	+1, USK Erpet Praha got wild card
19	Slovakia	6.555	1	

Rank	Country	Points	Teams	Notes
20	Macedonia	6.111	1	+1, MZT got wild card
21	Austria	5.445	1	
22	Sweden	5.333	1	
23	Cyprus	4.333	1	
24	England	4.167	1	
25	Latvia	3.722	1	
26	Switzerland	3.083	1	-1, Fribourg Olympic withdrew
27	Bulgaria	2.694	1	-1, Slavia Sofia withdrew
28	Romania	2.389	1	-1, Dinamo București withdrew
29	Finland	1.861	1	
30	Bosnia and Herzegovina	1.778	1	
31	Estonia	1.500	1	
32	Netherlands	1.500	1	
33	Georgia	1.500	0	
34	Luxembourg	1.444	0	
35	Albania	1.361	0	
36	Denmark	0.167	0	
37	Moldova	0.111	0	
38	Belarus	0.056	0	

== Team allocation ==
The labels in the parentheses show how each team qualified for the place of its starting round:

- 1st, 2nd, 3rd, 4th, 5th, etc.: League position after eventual Playoffs
- CW: Cup winners
- WC: Wild card

Regular season
(Spain) Festina Joventut (4th)	(Germany) Bayer 04 Leverkusen (3rd)	(Belgium) Spirou (1st)	(North Macedonia) Rabotnički (1st)
(Spain) Cáceres (10th)	(Germany) Tatami Rhöndorf (5th)	(Belgium) Sunair Oostende (CW)	(North Macedonia) MZT Skopje (WC)
(Greece) Panathinaikos (5th)	(Croatia) Zrinjevac (3rd)	(Poland) Mazowzanka (1st)	(Slovakia) Slovakofarma Pezinok (1st)
(Greece) Apollon Achaia Clauss (7th)	(Croatia) Zagreb (6th)	(Poland) Śląsk Wrocław (CW)	(Austria) UKJ SÜBA Sankt Pölten (1st)
(Italy) Stefanel Milano (5th)	(Israel) Maccabi Ironi Ra`anana (3rd)	(Lithuania) Žalgiris (1st)	(Sweden) Plannja Basket (1st)
(Italy) Polti Cantù (8th)	(Israel) Hapoel Eilat (4th)	(Lithuania) Žemaitijos Lokiai (2nd)	(Cyprus) Keravnos (1st)
(France) ASVEL (CW)	(Slovenia) Kovinotehna Savinjska Polzela (2nd)	(Ukraine) Budivelnyk (1st)	(England) London Towers (1st)
(France) Le Mans (5th)	(Slovenia) Pivovarna Laško (4th)	(Ukraine) BIPA-Moda Odesa (2nd)	(Latvia) ASK Brocēni (1st)
(Turkey) Tofaş (4th)	(Federal Republic of Yugoslavia) FMP Železnik (CW)	(Hungary) Danone-Honvéd (1st)	(Finland) Torpan Pojat (1st)
(Turkey) Fenerbahçe (5th)	(Federal Republic of Yugoslavia) Beobanka (3rd)	(Hungary) Marc-Körmend (WC)	(Bosnia and Herzegovina) Sloboda Dita (1st)
(Russia) Avtodor Saratov (2nd)	(Portugal) Oliveirense (2nd)	(Czech Republic) ICEC Opava (1st)	(Estonia) Kalev Talinn (2nd)
(Russia) Samara (3rd)	Portugal Telecom (3rd)	(Czech Republic) USK Erpet Praha (WC)	(Netherlands) Libertel Dolphins EBBC (1st)

== Preliminary group stage ==
Key to colors
Qualified to Round of 32
Eliminated

=== Group A ===
	Team	Pld	Pts	W	L	PF	PA	PD
1.	(Spain) Festina Joventut	10	19	9	1	884	782	+102
2.	(Turkey) Tofaş	10	17	7	3	793	698	+95
3.	(Ukraine) BIPA-Moda Odesa	10	17	7	3	731	644	+87
4.	(Finland) Torpan Pojat	10	15	5	5	738	735	+3
5.	(Lithuania) Žemaitijos Lokiai	10	12	2	8	734	854	−120
6.	(North Macedonia) Rabotnički	10	10	0	10	653	820	−167

=== Group B ===
	Team	Pld	Pts	W	L	PF	PA	PD
1.	(France) Le Mans	10	17	7	3	794	792	+2
2.	(Poland) Śląsk Wrocław	10	16	6	4	760	751	+9
3.	(Slovenia) Pivovarna Laško	10	16	6	4	800	783	+17
4.	(Turkey) Fenerbahçe	10	15	5	5	783	763	+20
5.	(Latvia) ASK Brocēni	10	15	5	5	879	832	+47
6.	(Czech Republic) ICEC Opava	10	11	1	9	745	840	−95

=== Group C ===
	Team	Pld	Pts	W	L	PF	PA	PD
1.	(Lithuania) Žalgiris	10	17	7	3	777	672	+105
2.	(France) ASVEL	10	17	7	3	677	642	+35
3.	(Poland) Mazowzanka	10	16	6	4	827	790	+37
4.	(Croatia) Zagreb	10	16	6	4	776	704	+72
5.	(Estonia) Kalev	10	14	4	6	690	737	−47
6.	(North Macedonia) MZT Aerodrom	10	10	0	10	634	836	−202

=== Group D ===
	Team	Pld	Pts	W	L	PF	PA	PD
1.	(Spain) Cáceres	10	16	6	4	836	767	+69
2.	(Russia) Samara	10	16	6	4	801	774	+27
3.	(Federal Republic of Yugoslavia) FMP Železnik	10	16	6	4	793	719	+74
4.	(Cyprus) Keravnos	10	15	5	5	681	743	−62
5.	(Portugal) Oliveirense	10	14	4	6	713	787	−74
6.	(Sweden) Plannja	10	13	3	7	819	853	−34

=== Group E ===
	Team	Pld	Pts	W	L	PF	PA	PD
1.	(Italy) Stefanel Milano	10	18	8	2	840	729	+111
2.	(Federal Republic of Yugoslavia) Beobanka	10	17	7	3	784	716	+68
3.	(Israel) Hapoel Eilat	10	17	7	3	805	787	+18
4.	(Germany) Tatami Rhöndorf	10	15	5	5	765	814	−49
5.	(Hungary) Danone-Honvéd	10	12	2	8	721	779	−58
6.	(England) London Towers	10	11	1	9	692	782	−90

=== Group F ===
	Team	Pld	Pts	W	L	PF	PA	PD
1.	(Belgium) Spirou	10	18	8	2	855	710	+145
2.	(Greece) Apollon Patras	10	17	7	3	910	795	+115
3.	(Croatia) Zrinjevac	10	16	6	4	836	822	+14
4.	(Slovenia) Kovinotehna Savinjska Polzela	10	15	5	5	859	842	+17
5.	(Netherlands) Libertel Dolphins EBBC	10	13	3	7	761	889	−128
6.	(Czech Republic) USK Erpet Praha	10	11	1	9	730	893	−163

=== Group G ===
	Team	Pld	Pts	W	L	PF	PA	PD
1.	(Italy) Polti Cantù	10	19	9	1	916	762	+154
2.	(Belgium) Sunair Oostende	10	17	7	3	860	820	+40
3.	(Hungary) Marc-Körmend	10	16	6	4	822	807	+15
4.	(Germany) Bayer 04 Leverkusen	10	15	5	5	820	884	−64
5.	Portugal Telecom	10	13	3	7	863	873	−10
6.	(Bosnia and Herzegovina) Sloboda Dita	10	10	0	10	735	870	−135

=== Group H ===
	Team	Pld	Pts	W	L	PF	PA	PD
1.	(Greece) Panathinaikos	10	19	9	1	865	645	+220
2.	(Russia) Avtodor Saratov	10	18	8	2	879	834	+45
3.	(Israel) Maccabi Ironi Ra`anana	10	15	5	5	778	784	−6
4.	(Slovakia) Slovakofarma Pezinok	10	14	4	6	756	856	−100
5.	(Austria) SÜBA Sankt Pölten	10	12	2	8	707	802	−95
6.	(Ukraine) Budivelnyk	10	12	2	8	695	759	−64

== Round of 32 ==
Team 1	Agg.	Team 2	1st leg	2nd leg
Fenerbahçe (Turkey)	150–162	(Spain) Festina Joventut	78–75	72–87
Pivovarna Laško (Slovenia)	157–170	(Turkey) Tofaş	79–85	78–85
BIPA-Moda Odesa (Ukraine)	143–171	(Poland) Śląsk Wrocław	74–84	69–87
Torpan Pojat (Finland)	144–131	(France) Le Mans	77–69	67–62
Keravnos (Cyprus)	101–130	(Lithuania) Žalgiris	61–57	40–73
FMP Železnik (Federal Republic of Yugoslavia)	136–145	(France) ASVEL	71–66	65–79
Mazowzanka (Poland)	150–164	(Russia) Samara	78–94	72–70
Zagreb (Croatia)	151–146	(Spain) Cáceres	98–63	53–83
Kovinotehna Savinjska Polzela (Slovenia)	111–168	(Italy) Stefanel Milano	56–98	55–70
Zrinjevac (Croatia)	114–119	(Federal Republic of Yugoslavia) Beobanka	59–59	55–60
Hapoel Eilat (Israel)	180–173	(Greece) Apollon Patras	101–84	79–89
Tatami Rhöndorf (Germany)	177–159	(Belgium) Spirou	83–77	94–82
Slovakofarma Pezinok (Slovakia)	154–166	(Italy) Polti Cantù	95–87	59–79
Maccabi Ironi Ra`anana (Israel)	155–156	(Belgium) Sunair Oostende	86–82	69–74
Marc-Körmend (Hungary)	159–184	(Russia) Avtodor Saratov	83–85	76–99
Bayer 04 Leverkusen (Germany)	135–169	(Greece) Panathinaikos	64–86	71–83

== Round of 16 ==
Team 1	Agg.	Team 2	1st leg	2nd leg
ASVEL (France)	164–152	(Spain) Festina Joventut	82–74	82–78
Samara (Russia)	127–125	(Finland) Torpan Pojat	77–74	50–51
Tofaş (Turkey)	131–133	(Lithuania) Žalgiris	66–62	65–71
Śląsk Wrocław (Poland)	142–131	(Croatia) Zagreb	76–60	66–71
Sunair Oostende (Belgium)	140–162	(Italy) Stefanel Milano	68–80	72–82
Avtodor Saratov (Russia)	160–126	(Germany) Tatami Rhöndorf	71–50	89–76
Beobanka (Federal Republic of Yugoslavia)	163–136	(Italy) Polti Cantù	88–58	75–78
Hapoel Eilat (Israel)	148–164	(Greece) Panathinaikos	80–78	68–86

== Quarterfinals ==
Team 1	Agg.	Team 2	1st leg	2nd leg
ASVEL (France)	128–129	(Italy) Stefanel Milano	58–67	70–62
Avtodor Saratov (Russia)	181–175	(Russia) Samara	92–65	89–110
Žalgiris (Lithuania)	137–119	(Federal Republic of Yugoslavia) Beobanka	78–65	59–54
Panathinaikos (Greece)	143–119	(Poland) Śląsk Wrocław	82–58	61–61

== Semifinals ==
Team 1	Agg.	Team 2	1st leg	2nd leg
Panathinaikos (Greece)	138–144	(Italy) Stefanel Milano	77–58	61–86
Žalgiris (Lithuania)	159–151	(Russia) Avtodor Saratov	96–74	63–77

== Final ==
April 14, Hala Pionir, Belgrade

Team 1	Score	Team 2
Žalgiris (Lithuania)	82–67	(Italy) Stefanel Milano

1997–98 FIBA EuroCup Champions

Žalgiris
1st title

== Awards ==
=== FIBA Saporta Cup Finals MVP ===
- (Lithuania) Saulius Štombergas ( (Lithuania) Žalgiris)
