= 2001–02 FIBA Saporta Cup =

- League: FIBA Saporta Cup
- Sport: Basketball

Final
- Champions: (Italy) Montepaschi Siena
- Runners-up: (Spain) Pamesa Valencia
- Finals MVP: (North Macedonia) Petar Naumoski

FIBA Saporta Cup seasons
- ← 2000–01 ULEB Cup 2002-03 →

The 2001–02 FIBA Saporta Cup was the thirty-sixth edition of FIBA's 2nd-tier level European-wide professional club basketball competition. It was the last edition of the tournament. It took place between 30 October 2001 and 30 April 2002. The final was held at Lyon, France.

== Competition system ==
- 24 teams (national domestic cup champions, plus the best qualified teams in the most important European national domestic leagues), entered a preliminary group stage, divided into four groups of six teams each, playing a round-robin. The final standing were based on individual wins and defeats. In case of a tie between two or more teams, after the group stage, the following criteria were used to decide the final classification: 1) number of wins in one-to-one games between the teams; 2) basket average between the teams; 3) general basket average within the group.
- The top four teams from each group qualified for a 1/8 Final Playoff (X-pairings, home and away games), while the winners advanced further to 1/4 Finals and 1/2 Finals.
- The Final was played at a predetermined venue.

== Teams ==
The labels in the parentheses show how each team qualified for the place of its starting round:

- 1st, 2nd, 3rd, 4th, 5th, etc.: League position after eventual Playoffs
- QR1-2: Losers of the 2001-02 Euroleague qualifying rounds.
- CW: Cup winners

Regular season
(Spain) Pamesa Valencia (5th)	(Turkey) Darüşşafaka (3rd)^{QR1}	(Germany) Telekom Baskets Bonn (2nd)^{QR2}	(Bosnia and Herzegovina) Igokea (1st)
(Spain) Adecco Estudiantes (6th)	(Turkey) Türk Telekom (4th)	(Israel) Hapoel Jerusalem (2nd)	(Cyprus) Keravnos Keo (1st)
(Italy) Montepaschi Siena (6th)	(Greece) Panionios (5th)	(Croatia) Split CO (2nd)^{QR2}	Portugal Telecom (1st)^{QR2}
(Italy) Snaidero Udine (7th)	(Greece) Iraklis (6th)	(Poland) Anwil Włocławek (2nd)	(Netherlands) Ricoh Astronauts (1st)
(France) Le Mans (3rd)^{QR2}	(Russia) UNICS (2nd)	(Slovakia) Slovakofarma Pezinok (1st)	(Austria) Arkadia Traiskirchen Lions (CW)
(France) SIG Strasbourg (4th)	(Lithuania) Lietuvos rytas (2nd)^{QR1}	(Federal Republic of Yugoslavia) FMP (5th)	(Switzerland) Lugano Snakes (1st)^{QR2}

== Regular season ==
Key to colors
Qualified to Round of 16
Eliminated

=== Group A ===
	(Spain) VAL	(Italy) UDI	(Turkey) TÜR	(France) SIG	(Portugal) POR	(Switzerland) LUG
(Spain) VAL		80-62	76-77	78-73	86-68	83-64
(Italy) UDI	74-69		84-89	70-74	91-80	84-68
(Turkey) TÜR	75-79	73-79		92-80	87-75	101-71
(France) SIG	88-80	76-84	93-84		80-75	112-85
(Portugal) POR	82-88	70-74	108-104	91-98		115-78
(Switzerland) LUG	72-87	77-88	105-110	79-78	103-88	

	Team	Pld	W	L	PF	PA	Pts
1.	(Spain) Pamesa Valencia	10	7	3	806	735	17
2.	(Italy) Snaidero Udine	10	7	3	790	756	17
3.	(Turkey) Türk Telekom	10	6	4	852	818	16
4.	(France) SIG Strasbourg	10	6	4	852	818	16
5.	Portugal Telecom	10	2	8	852	889	12
6.	(Switzerland) Lugano Snakes	10	2	8	802	946	12

=== Group B ===
	(Italy) SIE	(Greece) PAN	(Israel) JER	(Spain) EST	(France) MSB	(Turkey) DAR
(Italy) SIE		74-71	99-77	106-93	91-86	106-83
(Greece) PAN	91-86		97-86	100-96	108-83	83-79
(Israel) JER	87-71	85-80		84-80	20-0	94-77
(Spain) EST	68-64	82-84	83-82		108-81	91-85
(France) MSB	46-94	88-75	89-82	86-96		91-61
(Turkey) DAR	58-60	88-87	79-88	76-86	72-93	

	Team	Pld	W	L	PF	PA	Pts
1.	(Italy) Montepaschi Siena	10	7	3	851	760	17
2.	(Greece) Panionios	10	6	4	876	847	16
3.	(Israel) Hapoel Jerusalem	10	6	4	785	755	16
4.	(Spain) Adecco Estudiantes	10	6	4	883	848	16
5.	(France) Le Mans*	10	4	6	743	807	13
6.	(Turkey) Darüşşafaka	10	1	9	758	879	11

*Le Mans was docked one point for not playing the game at Hapoel Jerusalem.

=== Group C ===
	(Lithuania) LIE	(Germany) TEL	(Russia) UNI	(Poland) ANW	(Netherlands) AST	(Austria) TRA
(Lithuania) LIE		95-82	81-76	91-66	97-75	106-65
(Germany) TEL	81-96		95-76	89-73	86-80	92-78
(Russia) UNI	84-64	86-71		88-90	98-78	112-49
(Poland) ANW	72-89	82-84	79-85		79-61	84-67
(Netherlands) AST	70-82	57-72	70-78	59-61		72-65
(Austria) TRA	75-111	81-102	66-93	74-105	66-82	

	Team	Pld	W	L	PF	PA	Pts
1.	(Lithuania) Lietuvos rytas	10	9	1	912	746	19
2.	(Germany) Telekom Baskets Bonn	10	7	3	854	804	17
3.	(Russia) UNICS	10	7	3	876	743	17
4.	(Poland) Anwil Włocławek	10	5	5	791	793	15
5.	(Netherlands) Ricoh Astronauts	10	2	8	710	784	12
6.	(Austria) Arkadia Traiskirchen Lions	10	0	10	686	959	10

=== Group D ===
	(Slovakia) PEZ	(Greece) IRA	(Federal Republic of Yugoslavia) FMP	(Croatia) SPL	(Bosnia and Herzegovina) IGO	(Cyprus) KER
(Slovakia) PEZ		86-74	95-92	85-89	62-58	93-62
(Greece) IRA	62-66		71-76	88-78	86-50	80-46
(Federal Republic of Yugoslavia) FMP	81-92	63-92		96-83	72-64	82-64
(Croatia) SPL	86-80	87-92	73-78		82-84	87-84
(Bosnia and Herzegovina) IGO	78-81	81-90	77-78	99-110		91-86
(Cyprus) KER	54-87	72-80	59-100	87-88	83-86	

	Team	Pld	W	L	PF	PA	Pts
1.	(Slovakia) Slovakofarma Pezinok	10	8	2	827	736	18
2.	(Greece) Iraklis	10	7	3	815	707	17
3.	(Federal Republic of Yugoslavia) FMP	10	7	3	818	770	17
4.	(Croatia) Split CO	10	5	5	863	873	15
5.	(Bosnia and Herzegovina) Igokea	10	3	7	768	827	13
6.	(Cyprus) Keravnos Keo	10	0	10	696	874	10

== Round of 16 ==
Team 1	Agg.	Team 2	1st leg	2nd leg
Adecco Estudiantes (Spain)	145–169	(Spain) Pamesa Valencia	77–80	68–89
Hapoel Jerusalem (Israel)	158–152	(Italy) Snaidero Udine	71–74	87–78
Türk Telekom (Turkey)	143–145	(Greece) Panionios	80–74	63–71
SIG Strasbourg (France)	144–152	(Italy) Montepaschi Siena	78–78	66–74
Split CO (Croatia)	137–184	(Lithuania) Lietuvos rytas	67–100	70–84
FMP (Federal Republic of Yugoslavia)	172–174	(Germany) Telekom Baskets Bonn	88–91	84–83
UNICS (Russia)	167–163	(Greece) Iraklis	91–79	76–84
Anwil Włocławek (Poland)	163–152	(Slovakia) Slovakofarma Pezinok	95–78	68–74

== Quarterfinals ==
Team 1	Agg.	Team 2	1st leg	2nd leg
Telekom Baskets Bonn (Germany)	156–176	(Spain) Pamesa Valencia	88–92	68–84
UNICS (Russia)	131–138	(Italy) Montepaschi Siena	73–70	58–68
Hapoel Jerusalem (Israel)	163–155	(Lithuania) Lietuvos rytas	88–90	75–65
Panionios (Greece)	142–149	(Poland) Anwil Włocławek	83–74	59–75

== Semifinals ==
Team 1	Agg.	Team 2	1st leg	2nd leg
Pamesa Valencia (Spain)	135–118	(Poland) Anwil Włocławek	77–65	58–53
Montepaschi Siena (Italy)	192–140	(Israel) Hapoel Jerusalem	98–69	94–71

== Final ==
April 30, Palais des Sports de Gerland, Lyon

Team 1	Score	Team 2
Pamesa Valencia (Spain)	71–81	(Italy) Montepaschi Siena

2001–02 FIBA Saporta Cup Champions

Montepaschi Siena
1st title

== Awards ==
=== FIBA Saporta Cup Finals MVP ===
- (North Macedonia) Petar Naumoski ( (Italy) Montepaschi Siena)

== See also ==
- 2001–02 Euroleague
- 2001–02 FIBA Korać Cup
