= 1991 ACB Playoffs =

Phase of the 1990-91 Spanish ACB basketball season

The 1991 ACB Playoffs was the final phase of the 1990–91 ACB season. It started on Wednesday, April 3, 1991, and run until Saturday, May 19, 1991.

First Round
1	Montigalà Joventut	2
16	DYC Breogán	0
8	At. Madrid Villalba	2
9	Valvi Girona	0
5	Taugrés	2
12	Pamesa Valencia	0
13	Caja Ronda	0
4	Real Madrid Otaysa	2
3	Estudiantes CP	2
14	Caixa Ourense	0
11	Huesca La Magia	0
6	CAI Zaragoza	2
7	Fórum Valladolid	2
10	Mayoral Maristas	0
15	Caja San Fernando	0
2	FC Barcelona	2

Quarterfinals
1	Montigalà Joventut	2
9	At. Madrid Villalba	0
5	Taugrés	2
4	Real Madrid Otaysa	0
3	Estudiantes CP	2
6	CAI Zaragoza	0
7	Fórum Valladolid	1
2	FC Barcelona	2

Semifinals
1	Montigalà Joventut	3
5	Taugrés	1
3	Estudiantes CP	1
2	FC Barcelona	3

Finals
1	Montigalà Joventut	3
2	FC Barcelona	1

== First round ==
The first round were best-of-3 series.

=== Montigalà Joventut vs. DYC Breogán ===
3 April

Report

Montigalà Joventut	83–66	DYC Breogán
Pts: Pressley 25; Rebs: Pressley, Martínez 12; Asts: Jofresa 4		Pts: Rowinski 26; Rebs: Riley 8 Asts: Alonso 3
1-0

Pabellón de Ausiàs March, Badalona
Attendance: 4,000

6 April

Report

DYC Breogán	75–103	Montigalà Joventut
Pts: Rowinski 22; Rebs: Riley 14; Asts: three players 2		Pts: Villacampa 26; Rebs: Thompson 15; Asts: Pressley, Thompson 3
0-2

Pabellón Municipal de Deportes, Lugo
Attendance: 3,500

Montigalà Joventut won the series 2-0

=== At. Madrid Villalba vs. Valvi Girona ===
3 April

Report

At. Madrid Villalba	78–69	Valvi Girona
Pts: Berry 27; Rebs: Berry 17; Asts: Ruiz 3		Pts: Johnson 29; Rebs: Johnson 8 Asts: Puig, Margall 2
1-0

Polideportivo Municipal, Collado Villalba
Attendance: 2,500

6 April

Report

Valvi Girona	72–83	At. Madrid Villalba
Pts: Margall 21; Rebs: Johnson 13; Asts: Costa 6		Pts: Berry 30; Rebs: Berry 12; Asts: Berry 5
0-2

Palau Sacosta, Girona
Attendance: 4,000

At. Madrid Villalba won the series 2-0

=== Taugrés vs. Pamesa Valencia ===
3 April

Report

Taugrés	66–58	Pamesa Valencia
Pts: Roth 19; Rebs: Arlauckas 12; Asts: Rivas 3		Pts: Branson 19; Rebs: Branson 11; Asts: Coterón 4
1-0

Araba Arena, Vitoria
Attendance: 4,250

6 April

Report

Pamesa Valencia	74–77	Taugrés
Pts: Díaz 21; Rebs: Micheaux 14; Asts: Díez 7		Pts: Arlauckas 24; Rebs: Rivas 8 Asts: Laso 10
0-2

Fuente San Luis, Valencia
Attendance: 2,000

Taugrés won the series 2-0

=== Real Madrid Otaysa vs. Caja Ronda ===
3 April

Report

Real Madrid Otaysa	95–83	Caja Ronda
Pts: Villalobos 19; Rebs: Herrera 14; Asts: Llorente 8		Pts: Draper 21; Rebs: Vecina 11; Asts: Smith 4
1-0

Palacio de Deportes, Madrid
Attendance: 4,000

6 April

Report

Caja Ronda	66–96	Real Madrid Otaysa
Pts: Draper 19; Rebs: Smith 11; Asts: Ramiro 8		Pts: Villalobos 20; Rebs: Roberts 12; Asts: Llorente 9
0-2

Pabellon Ciudad Jardín, Málaga
Attendance: 6,500

Real Madrid Otaysa won the series 2-0

=== Estudiantes Caja Postal vs. Caixa Ourense ===
3 April

Report

Estudiantes Caja Postal	91–76	Caixa Ourense
Pts: Antúnez 25; Rebs: Orenga 11; Asts: Antúnez 10		Pts: Barneda 18; Rebs: Wright 8 Asts: Suárez 6
1-0

Palacio de Deportes, Madrid
Attendance: 5,500

6 April

Report

Caixa Ourense	79–82	Estudiantes Caja Postal
Pts: Suárez 21; Rebs: Wright 12; Asts: Pérez, Suárez 5		Pts: Herreros 27; Rebs: Pinone 10; Asts: Pinone 9
0-2

Pazo dos Deportes Paco Paz, Ourense
Attendance: 5,000

Estudiantes Caja Postal won the series 2-0

=== CAI Zaragoza vs. Huesca La Magia ===
3 April

Report

CAI Zaragoza	81–68	Huesca La Magia
Pts: Magee 23; Rebs: Magee 19; Asts: Álvarez, Davis 5		Pts: Jackson 24; Rebs: Hall 17; Asts: Hall, Capablo 2
1-0

Príncipe Felipe Arena, Zaragoza
Attendance: 9,000

6 April

Report

Huesca La Magia	91–92	CAI Zaragoza
Pts: Hall 21; Rebs: Hall 14; Asts: Solé 3		Pts: Davis 29; Rebs: Magee 18; Asts: Arcega 6
0-2

Polideportivo Municipal, Huesca
Attendance: 3,100

CAI Zaragoza won the series 2-0

=== Fórum Valladolid vs. Mayoral Maristas ===
3 April

Report

Fórum Valladolid	88–73	Mayoral Maristas
Pts: Sabonis 21; Rebs: Sabonis 17; Asts: García 6		Pts: León 23; Rebs: Benoit 10; Asts: Rodriguez 3
1-0

Pabellón Polideportivo Pisuerga, Valladolid
Attendance: 5,000

6 April

Report

Mayoral Maristas	55–78	Fórum Valladolid
Pts: Benoit 17; Rebs: Benoit 9 Asts: Rodriguez 5		Pts: García 22; Rebs: Sabonis 13; Asts: Corbalán 5
0-2

Pabellon Ciudad Jardin, Málaga
Attendance: 3,800

Fórum Valladolid won the series 2-0

=== FC Barcelona vs. Caja San Fernando ===
3 April

Report

FC Barcelona	96–79	Caja San Fernando
Pts: Ortiz, Norris 20; Rebs: Ortiz 12; Asts: Norris 4		Pts: Bingenheimer 27; Rebs: Lockhart 10; Asts: Llorente 5
1-0

Palau Sant Jordi, Barcelona
Attendance: 6,500

6 April

Report

Caja San Fernando	76–86	FC Barcelona
Pts: Lockhart 22; Rebs: Bingenheimer 8 Asts: Bingenheimer, Lafuente 3		Pts: San Epifanio 25; Rebs: Trumbo 10; Asts: Montero 6
0-2

Palacio Municipal de Deportes San Pablo, Sevilla
Attendance: 8,000

FC Barcelona won the series 2-0

== Quarterfinals ==
The quarterfinals were best-of-3 series.

=== Montigalà Joventut vs. At. Madrid Villalba ===
14 April

Report

Montigalà Joventut	87–74	At. Madrid Villalba
Pts: Pressley 23; Rebs: Thompson 13; Asts: Thompson 3		Pts: Berry 34; Rebs: Berry 8 Asts: four players 1
1-0

Pabellón de Ausiàs March, Badalona
Attendance: 5,000

20 April

Report

At. Madrid Villalba	79–84	Montigalà Joventut
Pts: Berry 27; Rebs: Wright 16; Asts: Ruiz 7		Pts: Villacampa 29; Rebs: Martínez 9 Asts: Jofresa, Villacampa 2
0-2

Polideportivo Municipal, Collado Villalba
Attendance: 3,000

Montigalà Joventut won the series 2-0.

=== Real Madrid Otaysa vs. Taugrés ===
13 April

Report

Real Madrid Otaysa	78–81	Taugrés
Pts: Herrera, Martín 16; Rebs: Roberts 9 Asts: Llorente, Biriukov 4		Pts: Arlauckas 25; Rebs: Rivas 11; Asts: Roth 9
0-1

Palacio de Deportes, Madrid
Attendance: 7,000

21 April

Report

Taugrés	86–68	Real Madrid Otaysa
Pts: Sibilo 26; Rebs: Roth 18; Asts: Roth, Laso 4		Pts: Llorente 16; Rebs: Roberts, Herrera 6 Asts: Llorente 6
2-0

Araba Arena, Vitoria
Attendance: 5,450

Taugrés won the series 2-0

=== Estudiantes Caja Postal vs. CAI Zaragoza ===
14 April

Report

Estudiantes Caja Postal	87–72	CAI Zaragoza
Pts: Pinone 24; Rebs: Pinone 8 Asts: Antúnez 5		Pts: Davis 18; Rebs: Magee 15; Asts: Davis, Arcega 3
1-0

Palacio de Deportes, Madrid
Attendance: 8,000

19 April

Report

CAI Zaragoza	85–94	Estudiantes Caja Postal
Pts: Davis 21; Rebs: Magee 12; Asts: Ruiz, Arcega 3		Pts: Antúnez 30; Rebs: Winslow 9 Asts: Antúnez 4
0-2

Príncipe Felipe Arena, Zaragoza
Attendance: 11,000

Estudiantes Caja Postal won the series 2-0

=== FC Barcelona vs. Fórum Valladolid ===
13 April

Report

FC Barcelona	64–65	Fórum Valladolid
Pts: Montero, Norris 14; Rebs: Trumbo 9 Asts: Montero, San Epifanio 3		Pts: Sabonis 30; Rebs: Sabonis 14; Asts: Corbalán 4
0-1

Palau Sant Jordi, Barcelona
Attendance: 8,730

21 April

Report

Fórum Valladolid	74–77	FC Barcelona
Pts: Sabonis 35; Rebs: Sabonis 16; Asts: Corbalán 5		Pts: San Epifanio 20; Rebs: Trumbo 7 Asts: Trumbo, Solozábal 4
1-1

Pabellón Polideportivo Pisuerga, Valladolid
Attendance: 8,000

23 April

Report

FC Barcelona	77–64	Fórum Valladolid
Pts: San Epifanio 20; Rebs: Norris 8 Asts: Solozábal 7		Pts: Sabonis 28; Rebs: Sabonis 8 Asts: Corbalán 3
2-1

Palau Sant Jordi, Barcelona
Attendance: 14,957

FC Barcelona won the series 2-1

== Semifinals ==
The semifinals were best-of-5 series.

=== Montigalà Joventut vs. Taugrés ===
25 April

Report

Montigalà Joventut	88–76	Taugrés
Pts: Villacampa 26; Rebs: Martínez 11; Asts: Jofresa 8		Pts: Sibilo 23; Rebs: de la Cruz 8 Asts: Laso 6
1-0

Pabellón de Ausiàs March, Badalona
Attendance: 5,500

28 April

Report

Montigalà Joventut	111–74	Taugrés
Pts: Villacampa 33; Rebs: Thompson 9 Asts: Jofresa 5		Pts: Sibilo 27; Rebs: Rivas 10; Asts: Rivas 4
2-0

Pabellón de Ausiàs March, Badalona
Attendance: 5,500

2 May

Report

Taugrés	87–67	Montigalà Joventut
Pts: Arlauckas 22; Rebs: Arlauckas 14; Asts: Laso 7		Pts: Jofresa, Thompson 15; Rebs: Martínez, Pressley 7 Asts: Jofresa, Thompson 3
1-2

Araba Arena, Vitoria
Attendance: 4,000

5 May

Report

Taugrés	84–102	Montigalà Joventut
Pts: Arlauckas 27; Rebs: Arlauckas 6 Asts: Laso 5		Pts: Jofresa 28; Rebs: Thompson 10; Asts: Villacampa 3
1-3

Araba Arena, Vitoria
Attendance: 4,500

Montigalà Joventut won the series 3-1

=== FC Barcelona vs. Estudiantes Caja Postal ===
26 April

Report

FC Barcelona	84–79	Estudiantes Caja Postal
Pts: San Epifanio 28; Rebs: Trumbo 14; Asts: Norris 4		Pts: Herreros 32; Rebs: Pinone 11; Asts: Antúnez 6
1-0

Palau Sant Jordi, Barcelona
Attendance: 10,253

28 April

Report

FC Barcelona	83–81	Estudiantes Caja Postal
Pts: San Epifanio 26; Rebs: Trumbo 11; Asts: Montero 6		Pts: Winslow 20; Rebs: Orenga 12; Asts: Antúnez 7
2-0

Palau Sant Jordi, Barcelona
Attendance: 15,104

3 May

Report

Estudiantes Caja Postal	80–73	FC Barcelona
Pts: Winslow 22; Rebs: Pinone, Winslow 7 Asts: Antúnez 4		Pts: Trumbo 19; Rebs: Ortiz 9 Asts: Solozábal, San Epifanio 2
1-2

Palacio de Deportes, Madrid
Attendance: 12,000

5 May

Report

Estudiantes Caja Postal	92–94	FC Barcelona
Pts: Pinone 20; Rebs: Winslow 15; Asts: Azofra 5		Pts: San Epifanio 32; Rebs: Trumbo 12; Asts: Solozábal 3
1-3

Palacio de Deportes, Madrid
Attendance: 12,000

FC Barcelona won the series 3-1

== Finals ==
The finals was a best-of-5 series.

=== Montigalà Joventut vs. FC Barcelona ===
12 May

Report

Montigalà Joventut	73–65	FC Barcelona
Pts: Thompson 24; Rebs: Thompson 9 Asts: Pressley 5		Pts: Solozábal 20; Rebs: Trumbo 12; Asts: Solozábal 5
1-0

Pabellón de Ausiàs March, Badalona
Attendance: 5,500

14 May

Report

Montigalà Joventut	84–72	FC Barcelona
Pts: Pressley 22; Rebs: Pressley 13; Asts: Thompson 4		Pts: Ortiz 27; Rebs: Trumbo 16; Asts: Solozábal 6
2-0

Pabellón de Ausiàs March, Badalona
Attendance: 5,500

17 May

Report

FC Barcelona	85–83	Montigalà Joventut
Pts: Trumbo 17; Rebs: Trumbo 13; Asts: three players 4		Pts: Pressley 32; Rebs: three players 4 Asts: four players 3
1-2

Palau Sant Jordi, Barcelona
Attendance: 15,064

19 May

Report

FC Barcelona	78–81	Montigalà Joventut
Pts: San Epifanio 27; Rebs: Ortiz 12; Asts: Solozábal 7		Pts: Villacampa 23; Rebs: Thompson 15; Asts: Jofresa 5
1-3

Palau Sant Jordi, Barcelona
Attendance: 15,101

Montigalà Joventut won the series 3-1

ACB Finals MVP: (United States) Corny Thompson

1990-91 ACB League
Montigalà Joventut
3rd Title
1st since ACB
