= 1993 Copa del Rey de Baloncesto =

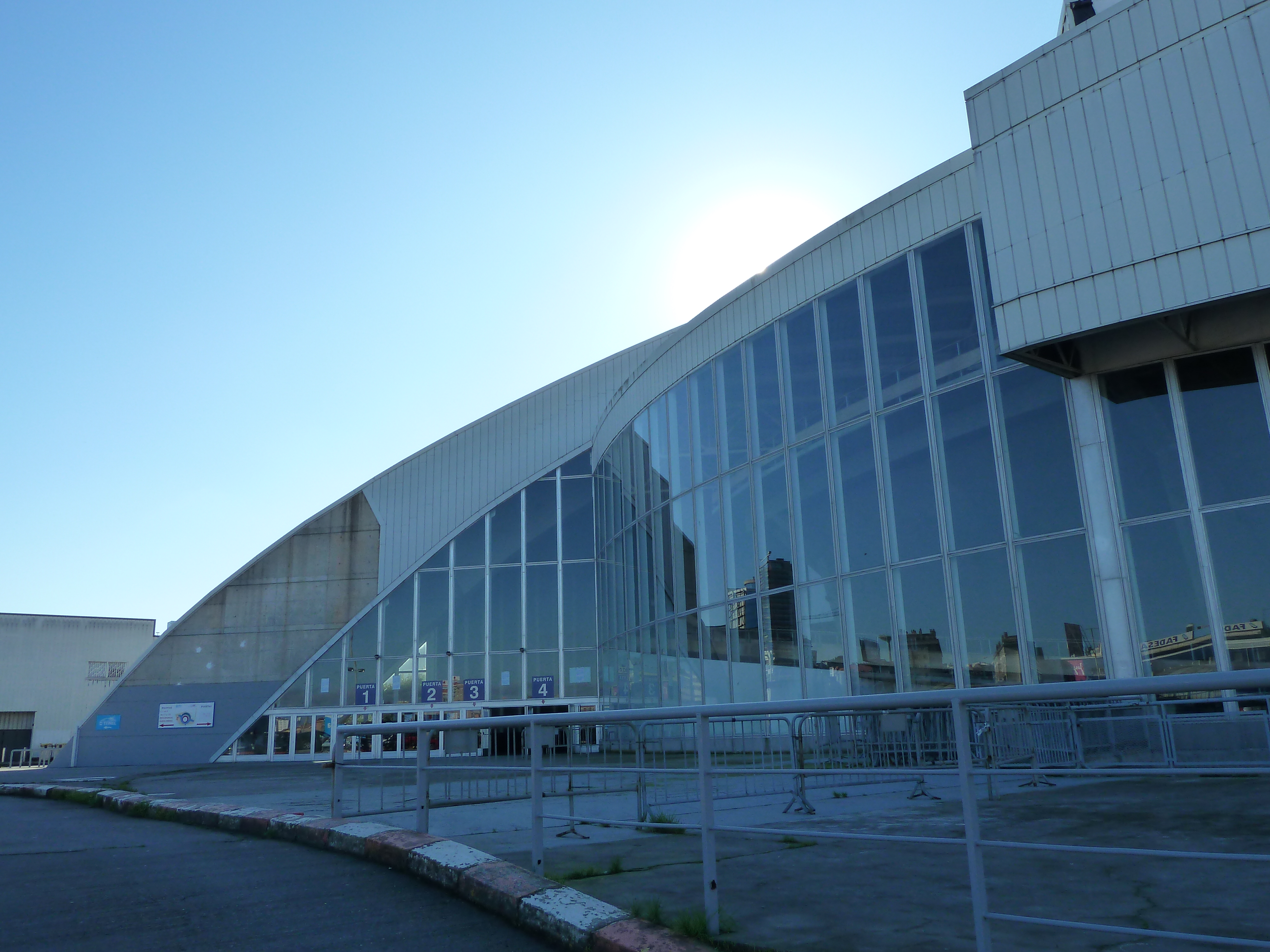
The Coliseum of A Coruña.

The 1993 Copa del Rey was the 57th edition of the Spanish basketball Cup. It was organized by the ACB and was played in A Coruña in the Coliseum between March 4 and 7, 1993.

This edition was played by the 22 teams of the 1992–93 ACB season. The four first qualified teams of the previous season qualified directly to the Final Eight while teams 5 to 8 joined the competition in the third round. In the draw of the first round, two teams received a bye.

== First round ==
Teams #2 played the second leg at home.

Team 1	Agg.	Team 2	1st leg	2nd leg	
Valvi Girona	156–159	BFI Granollers	73–63	83–96	{{{8}}}
Júver Murcia	137–145	TDK Manresa	71–66	66–79	{{{8}}}
Unicaja Mayoral	148–170	Coren Orense	78–95	70–75	{{{8}}}
Festina Andorra	150–155	DYC Breogán	74–70	76–85	{{{8}}}
Cáceres CB	168–165	Argal Huesca	88–74	80–91	{{{8}}}
Caja San Fernando	184–153	Ferrys Llíria	90–70	94–83	{{{8}}}

== Second round ==
Team 1	Agg.	Team 2	1st leg	2nd leg	
Pamesa Valencia	148–154	BFI Granollers	66–68	82–86	{{{8}}}
Pescanova Ferrol	137–141	TDK Manresa	73–74	64–67	{{{8}}}
Coren Orense	133–135	DYC Breogán	64–67	69–69	{{{8}}}
Cáceres CB	155–172	Caja San Fernando	72–76	83–96	{{{8}}}

== Third round ==
Team 1	Agg.	Team 2	1st leg	2nd leg
BFI Granollers	156–158	TDK Manresa	81–72	75–86
DYC Breogán	170–196	Caja San Fernando	88–103	82–93
FC Barcelona Banca Catalana	192–188	Elosúa León	100–91	92–97
NatWest Zaragoza	169–165	Grupo Libro Valladolid	83–76	86–89

== Final Eight Bracket ==
Quarterfinals; March 4
Marbella Joventut	86
TDK Manresa	57
Estudiantes Argentaria	75
NatWest Zaragoza	91
Real Madrid Teka	101
Caja San Fernando	89
Taugrés	78
FCB Banca Catalana	74

Semifinals; March 6
Marbella Joventut	85
NatWest Zaragoza	71
Real Madrid Teka	89
Taugrés	70

Final; March 7
Marbella Joventut	71
Real Madrid Teka	74
Third place
NatWest Zaragoza	61
Taugrés	74

== Final ==
7 March 1993
20:00 GTM+1

Boxscore

Real Madrid Teka	74–71	Marbella Joventut
Scoring by half: 33–40, 41–31
Pts: Sabonis 25; Rebs: Sabonis 11; Asts: Antúnez 2 PIR: Sabonis 29		Pts: Villacampa 22; Rebs: Thompson 5 PIR: Villacampa 25

Coliseum, A Coruña
Attendance: 9,000
Referees: Miguel Ángel Betancort, Juan Carlos Mitjana

1993 Copa del Rey Champions

Real Madrid Teka
22nd title

- MVP of the Tournament: Joe Arlauckas
