= 1995 FIBA European League Final Four =

Club basketball tournament in Zaragoza, Spain

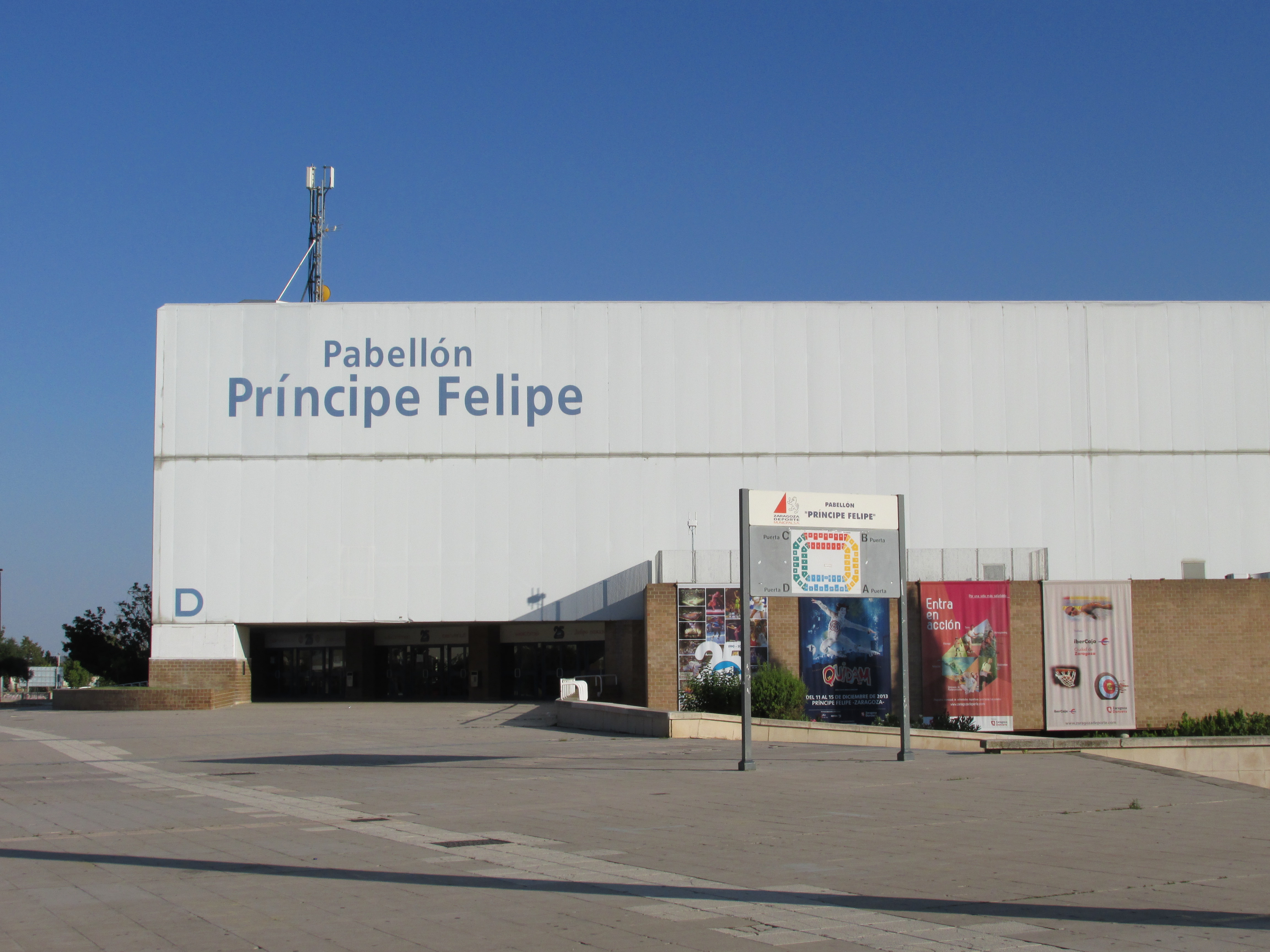
- The Pabellón Príncipe Felipe hosted the Final Four
- Season: 1994–95 FIBA European League

Tournament details
- Arena: Pabellón Príncipe Felipe; Zaragoza, Spain
- Dates: 11–13 April 1995

Final positions
- Champions: (Spain) Real Madrid Teka (1st title)
- Runners-up: (Greece) Olympiacos
- Third place: (Greece) Panathinaikos
- Fourth place: (France) Limoges CSP

Awards and statistics
- MVP: (Lithuania) Arvydas Sabonis

The 1995 FIBA European League Final Four was the 1994–95 season's FIBA European League Final Four tournament, organized by FIBA Europe. The event was hosted at the Pabellón Príncipe Felipe in Zaragoza, Spain. The event was held from April 11 until April 13, 1995. Real Madrid Teka won its eighth title, after defeating Olympiacos in the final game.

== Bracket ==
Semifinals; 11 April
(France) Limoges CSP	49
(Spain) Real Madrid Teka	62
(Greece) Panathinaikos	52
(Greece) Olympiacos	58

Final; 13 April
(Spain) Real Madrid Teka	73
(Greece) Olympiacos	61
Third place game
(France) Limoges CSP	77
(Greece) Panathinaikos	91

== Semifinals ==
=== Limoges CSP v Real Madrid Teka ===
11 April 1995	Limoges CSP (France)	49–62	(Spain) Real Madrid Teka	Pabellón Príncipe Felipe, Zaragoza
19:00	Scoring by half: 19–27, 30–35
	Pts: Kempton 22; Rebs: Young 9 Asts: Dacoury 3	Boxscore	Pts: Sabonis 21; Rebs: Sabonis 9 Asts: Lasa 3	Attendance: 11,000; Referees: Stefano Cazzaro (ITA), Carl Jungebrand (FIN)

=== Panathinaikos v Olympiacos ===
11 April 1995	Panathinaikos (Greece)	52–58	(Greece) Olympiacos	Pabellón Príncipe Felipe, Zaragoza
21:00	Scoring by half: 29–27, 23–31
	Pts: Paspalj 17; Rebs: Vranković 17; Asts: Paspalj 3	Boxscore	Pts: Johnson 27; Rebs: Johnson 10; Asts: Sigalas 3	Attendance: 11,000; Referees: Wieslaw Zych (POL), Romualdas Brazauskas (LTU)

== Third place game ==
13 April 1995	Limoges CSP (France)	77–91	(Greece) Panathinaikos	Pabellón Príncipe Felipe, Zaragoza
19:30	Scoring by half: 35–48, 42–43
	Pts: Young 24; Rebs: M'Bahia 8 Asts: Dacoury, Young 2	Boxscore	Pts: Alvertis 29; Rebs: Vranković 11; Asts: Vranković 3	Attendance: 11,000; Referees: Stefano Cazzaro (ITA), Romualdas Brazauskas (LTU)

== Final ==
13 April 1995	Real Madrid Teka (Spain)	73–61	(Greece) Olympiacos	Zaragoza
21:30 (CEST)	Scoring by half: 38–28, 35–33
	Pts: Sabonis 23; Rebs: Sabonis 7 Asts: Antúnez, Lasa 4	Boxscore	Pts: Nakić, Volkov 15; Rebs: Sigalas 9 Asts: Johnson, Tomić 2	Arena: Pabellón Príncipe Felipe; Attendance: 11,000; Referees: Wieslaw Zych (POL), Carl Jungebrand (FIBA)

Starters:			Pts	Reb	Ast
PG	9	(Spain) José Miguel Antúnez	12	4	4
SG	6	(Spain) Javier García Coll	2	0	1
SF	5	(Spain) Ismael Santos	7	5	0
PF	8	(United States) Joe Arlauckas	16	4	3
C	11	(Lithuania) Arvydas Sabonis	23	7	1
Reserves:					
PG	4	(Spain) José Lasa	1	2	4
C	13	(Spain) Pep Cargol	6	2	0
C	15	(Spain) Antonio Martín	6	6	1
Head coach:
(Basketball Federation of Yugoslavia) Željko Obradović

Real Madrid Teka	Olympiacos

Starters:			Pts	Reb	Ast
PG	11	(Federal Republic of Yugoslavia) Milan Tomić	3	1	2
SG	5	(Greece) Georgios Sigalas	10	9	1
SF	8	(United States) Eddie Johnson	9	5	2
PF	15	(Ukraine) Alexander Volkov	15	7	0
C	10	(Greece) Panagiotis Fasoulas	0	6	1
Reserves:					
PG	4	(Greece) Efthymis Bakatsias	2	1	0
SF	9	(Croatia) Franko Nakić	15	3	1
C	12	(Federal Republic of Yugoslavia) Dragan Tarlać	7	5	0
Head coach:
(Hellenic Basketball Federation) Giannis Ioannidis

- Team captains (C): (Spain) José Miguel Antúnez (Real Madrid) and (Greece) Argyris Kampouris (Olympiacos)

== Awards ==
=== FIBA European League Final Four MVP ===
- (Lithuania) Arvydas Sabonis ( (Spain) Real Madrid)

=== FIBA European League Finals Top Scorer ===
- (Lithuania) Arvydas Sabonis ( (Spain) Real Madrid)

=== FIBA European League All-Final Four Team ===
FIBA European League All-Final Four Team
Player	Team	Ref.
(Spain) José Miguel Antúnez	Real Madrid	
(Spain) Ismael Santos	Real Madrid	
(United States) Eddie Johnson	Olympiacos	
(United States) Joe Arlauckas	Real Madrid	
(Lithuania) Arvydas Sabonis (MVP)	Real Madrid	
