= Daniel Álvarez =

Daniel Álvarez may refer to:

- Daniel Álvarez (basketball) (born 1971), retired basketball player
- Daniel Alvarez (soccer, born 1978), retired American soccer player
- Daniel Álvarez (footballer, born 1994), Mexican football winger
- Daniel Alvarez (bassist) (fl. 2011–present), American metal bassist
- Danny Alvarez, American politician
