= 1995–96 FIBA European Cup =

- League: FIBA European Cup
- Sport: Basketball

Final
- Champions: (Spain) Taugrés
- Runners-up: (Greece) PAOK
- Finals MVP: (Puerto Rico) Ramón Rivas

FIBA European Cup seasons
- ← 1994–95 1996–97 →

The 1995–96 FIBA European Cup was the thirtieth edition of FIBA's 2nd-tier level European-wide professional club basketball competition. it occurred between September 5, 1995, and March 12, 1996. The final was held at Araba Arena, Vitoria, Spain. In the final, Taugrés defeated PAOK, in front of 5,500 spectators.

== Team allocation ==
=== Country ranking ===
For the 1995–1996 FIBA European League, the countries are allocated places according to their place on the FIBA country rankings, which takes into account their performance in European competitions from 1992–93 to 1994–95.

Country ranking for 1995–1996 FIBA European Cup

Rank	Country	1992-93	1993-94	1994-95	Average
1	Spain	212	340	300	284,00
2	Greece	253	322	249,375	274,79
3	Italy	363	173	260	265,33
4	France	219	123	179	173,67
5	Croatia	62,86	70	68	66,95
6	Turkey	58,33	73	69	66,78
7	Germany	37	45	103	61,67
8	Israel	66	48	61	58,33
9	Slovenia	24	72,5	27,5	41,33
10	Belgium	51	37	24	37,33
11	Russia	12	10	59	27,00
12	Portugal	9	21	25,83	18,61
13	Ukraine	15,33	13	27	18,44
14	Czech Republic	13	13	11	12,33
15	Hungary	5,33	7,5	18	10,28
16	Poland	4,5	4	18,33	8,94
17	Macedonia	0	20	6	8,67
18	Switzerland	6	9	8,5	7,83
19	Slovakia	0	10	8,33	6,11
20	Romania	11	2	4,67	5,89
21	Lithuania	3	2	12	5,67
22	Latvia	6	2	9	5,67

Rank	Country	1992-93	1993-94	1994-95	Average
23	Bulgaria	7,5	5,67	1,33	4,83
24	Cyprus	5,33	5,33	3	4,55
25	Austria	1	6	4,67	3,89
26	Luxembourg	4	2	2	2,67
27	Sweden	0,37	1	6	2,46
28	Finland	3,5	1,67	2	2,39
29	England	0,67	4,17	2	2,28
30	Netherlands	1,67	2,33	2,5	2,17
31	Georgia	2	0	3,33	1,78
32	Albania	1	0,67	2	1,22
33	Iceland	0,33	2,5	0,2	1,01
34	Estonia	1	0,33	1,67	1,00
35	Bosnia and Herzegovina	0	0	2	0,67
36	Belarus	0,4	0,5	0	0,30
37	Armenia	0,4	0	0	0,13
38	Moldova	0	0,2	0,2	0,13
39	Denmark	0	0	0,2	0,07
40	Ireland	0	0,2	0	0,07
41	Wales	0	0,2	0	0,07
42	Malta	0,2	0	0	0,07
43	Yugoslavia (banned)	0	0	0	0

=== Teams ===
The labels in the parentheses show how each team qualified for the place of its starting round:

- CW: Cup winners
- CF: Cup finalist
- 1st, 2nd, 3rd, 4th, 5th, etc.: League position after eventual Playoffs
- QR2: Loser clubs* of the 1/16 finals of the FIBA European League

Third round
(Croatia) Zrinjevac (QR2)	(Ukraine) Budivelnyk (QR2)	(Lithuania) Žalgiris (QR2)	(Federal Republic of Yugoslavia) Partizan Inex (QR2)
(Israel) Hapoel Galil Elyon (QR2)	(Switzerland) Fidefinanz Bellinzona (QR2)	(Cyprus) APOEL (QR2)	
(Slovenia) Smelt Olimpija (QR2)	(Slovakia) Baník Cígeľ Prievidza (QR2)	(England) Sheffield Sharks (QR2)	
(Belgium) Sunair Oostende (QR2)	(Romania) CSU Forest Sibiu (QR2)	(Estonia) Kalev Talinn (QR2)	
Second round
(Spain) Taugres (CW)	(Turkey) Galatasaray (CW)	(Russia) Dynamo Moscow (2nd)	(Lithuania) Olimpas (7th)
(Italy) Illycafe Trieste (CF)	(Israel) Bnei Herzlia (CW)	(Portugal) Porto (CF)	
(France) Limoges CSP (CW)	(Slovenia) Republika Postojna (CF)	(Ukraine) Dendi-Basket (2nd)	
(Croatia) Zagreb (7th)	(Belgium) Basket Brussels (CW)	(Poland) WTK Nobiles Wloclawek (CW)	
First round
(Greece) PAOK (CW)	(Slovakia) AŠK Inter Bratislava (CW)	(Luxembourg) Union Sportive Hiefenech	(Albania) Partizani Tirana (CW)
(Germany) Ratiopharm Ulm (CF)	(Romania) Universitatea Cluj (CW)	(Sweden) New Wave Sharks (2nd)	(Bosnia and Herzegovina) Sloboda Dita Tuzla (CW)
(Czech Republic) Tonak Novy Jicin (CW)	(Bulgaria) Kompakt (CW)	(Finland) Namika Lahti (5th)	(Federal Republic of Yugoslavia) Spartak Subotica (CF)
(Hungary) Marc-Kormend (CW)	(Cyprus) PAEEK (CF)	(England) Thames Valley Tigers (CW)	
(North Macedonia) Kočani Delikates (CW)	(Austria) UBC Stahlbau Oberwart (CW)	(Netherlands) Den Braven GOBA (CW)	

== First round ==
Team 1	Agg.	Team 2	1st leg	2nd leg
Thames Valley Tigers (England)	167–195	(Sweden) New Wave Sharks	93–105	74–90
Namika Lahti (Finland)	153–151	(Netherlands) Den Braven GOBA	75–78	78–73
PAEEK (Cyprus)	87–225	(Greece) PAOK	40–109	47–116
Kočani Delikates (North Macedonia)	156–152	(Bosnia and Herzegovina) Sloboda Dita Tuzla	93–82	63–70
Tonak Nový Jičín (Czech Republic)	163–175	(Germany) Ratiopharm Ulm	93–94	70–81
AŠK Inter Bratislava (Slovakia)	158–146	(Austria) UBC Stahlbau Oberwart	88–68	70–78
Union Sportive Hiefenech (Luxembourg)	121–178	(Hungary) Marc-Körmend	63–78	58–100
Universitatea Cluj-Napoca (Romania)	125–183	(Federal Republic of Yugoslavia) Spartak Subotica	64–87	61–96
Partizani Tirana (Albania)	115–151	(Bulgaria) Kompakt	56–73	59–78

== Second round ==
Team 1	Agg.	Team 2	1st leg	2nd leg
New Wave Sharks (Sweden)	161–153	(Italy) illycaffè Trieste	90–78	71–75
Namika Lahti (Finland)	172–191	(Spain) Taugrés	81–94	91–97
Porto (Portugal)	124–172	(France) Limoges CSP	52–95	72–77
Republika Postojna (Slovenia)	137–189	(Greece) PAOK	71–79	66–110
Kočani Delikates (North Macedonia)	122–145	(Croatia) Zagreb	68–83	54–62
Ratiopharm Ulm (Germany)	153–146	(Belgium) Basket Brussels	85–75	68–71
AŠK Inter Bratislava (Slovakia)	140–139	(Turkey) Galatasaray	76–76	64–63
Marc-Körmend (Hungary)	152–157	(Poland) Nobiles Włocławek	92–70	60–87
Spartak Subotica (Federal Republic of Yugoslavia)	155–156	(Israel) Bnei Herzliya	79–76	76–80
Kompakt (Bulgaria)	153–163	(Ukraine) Dendi	85–85	68–78
Olimpas (Lithuania)	156–164	(Russia) Dynamo Moscow	81–77	75–87

== Third round ==
- Wild card to participate in the European Cup for the Loser clubs* of the 1/16 finals of the 1995–96 FIBA European League.

*Partizan, Hapoel Galil Elyon, Sheffield Sharks, Sunair Oostende, Zrinjevac, Baník Cígeľ Prievidza, Smelt Olimpija, Budivelnyk, Kalev, Fidefinanz Bellinzona, Sibiu, APOEL and Žalgiris.

Team 1	Agg.	Team 2	1st leg	2nd leg
Partizan Inex (Federal Republic of Yugoslavia)	156–140	(Israel) Hapoel Galil Elyon	69–76	87–64
Sheffield Sharks (England)	128–159	(Belgium) Sunair Oostende	58–71	70–88
Ratiopharm Ulm (Germany)	153–162	(Croatia) Zrinjevac	78–82	75–80
Baník Cígeľ Prievidza (Slovakia)	169–180	(Slovenia) Smelt Olimpija	81–73	88–107
Zagreb (Croatia)	139–169	(Spain) Taugrés	65–65	74–104
Limoges CSP (France)	171–135	(Ukraine) Dendi	97–64	74–71
PAOK (Greece)	150–143	(Ukraine) Budivelnyk	76–68	74–75
Bnei Herzliya (Israel)	169–160	(Sweden) New Wave Sharks	98–86	71–74
Kalev Talinn (Estonia)	217–155	(Switzerland) Fidefinanz Bellinzona	116–76	101–79
Dynamo Moscow (Russia)	190–127	(Romania) Sibiu	105–68	85–59
APOEL (Cyprus)	133–187	(Lithuania) Žalgiris	82–100	51–87
AŠK Inter Bratislava (Slovakia)	146–156	(Poland) Nobiles Włocławek	87–76	59–80

== Quarterfinals group stage ==
Key to colors
Qualified to Semi-finals
Eliminated

=== Group A ===
	(Spain) TAU	(Lithuania) ŽAL	(France) LIM	(Federal Republic of Yugoslavia) PAR	(Israel) BNE	(Belgium) OOS
(Spain) TAU		91–93	79–73	99–88	81–67	87–74
(Lithuania) ŽAL	75–86		76–74	93–84	76–65	92–91
(France) LIM	88–86	82–68		78–75	82–60	84–64
(Federal Republic of Yugoslavia) PAR	76–80	90–99	103–90		98–85	88–67
(Israel) BNE	70–82	93–89	83–91	94–107		88–76
(Belgium) OOS	84–68	77–91	76–75	82–77	55–71	

	Team	Pld	Pts	W	L	PF	PA	PD
1.	(Spain) Taugrés	10	17	7	3	821	788	+33
2.	(Lithuania) Žalgiris	10	17	7	3	852	833	+19
3.	(France) Limoges CSP	10	16	6	4	817	752	+65
4.	(Federal Republic of Yugoslavia) Partizan Inex	10	14	4	6	886	867	+19
5.	(Israel) Bnei Herzliya	10	13	3	7	776	837	–61
6.	(Belgium) Sunair Oostende	10	13	3	7	746	821	–75

=== Group B ===
	Team	Pld	Pts	W	L	PF	PA	PD
1.	(Greece) PAOK	10	18	8	2	821	675	+146
2.	(Russia) Dynamo Moscow	10	17	7	3	812	772	+40
3.	(Croatia) Zrinjevac	10	16	5	5	839	808	+31
4.	(Estonia) Kalev Talinn	10	14	4	6	816	825	-9
5.	(Poland) Nobiles Włocławek	10	13	3	7	798	956	–158
6.	(Slovenia) Smelt Olimpija	10	13	3	7	770	820	–50

== Semifinals ==
Seeded teams played games 2 and 3 at home.

Team 1	Agg.	Team 2	1st leg	2nd leg	3rd leg
Dynamo Moscow (Russia)	0–2	(Spain) Taugrés	87–98	93–104	
Žalgiris (Lithuania)	0–2	(Greece) PAOK	76–83	59–104	

== Final ==
March 12, Pabellon Araba, Vitoria-Gasteiz

Team 1	Score	Team 2
Taugrés (Spain)	88–81	(Greece) PAOK

== Rosters ==
(Spain) Taugrés: Jordi Millera, Velimir Perasovic, Marcelo Nicola (C), Miguel Angel Reyes, Ramon Rivas; Jorge Garbajosa, Juan Pedro Cazorla, Ferran Lopez. Coach: Manel Comas
(Greece) PAOK: Nikos Boudouris, Branislav Prelevic (C), Predrag Stojakovic, Efthimios Rentzias, Dean Garrett; Giorgos Balogiannis, Christos Tsekos, Giannis Giannoulis, Sotirios Nikolaidis. Coach: Zeljko Lukajic

1995–96 FIBA European Cup Champions

Taugrés
1st title

== See also ==
- 1995–96 FIBA European League
- 1995–96 FIBA Korać Cup

== Awards ==
=== FIBA Saporta Cup Finals MVP ===
- (Puerto Rico) Ramón Rivas ( (Spain) Taugrés)
