= 1994–95 FIBA European League =

- League: FIBA European League
- Sport: Basketball

Regular Season
- Top scorer: (Federal Republic of Yugoslavia) Predrag Danilović (Buckler Beer Bologna)

Final Four
- Champions: (Spain) Real Madrid Teka (8th title)
- Runners-up: (Greece) Olympiacos
- Final Four MVP: (Lithuania) Arvydas Sabonis (Real Madrid Teka)

FIBA European League seasons
- ← 1993–94 1995–96 →

The 1994–95 FIBA European League, also shortened to 1994–95 FIBA EuroLeague, was the 38th installment of the European top-tier level professional club competition for basketball clubs (now called EuroLeague). It began on September 8, 1994, and ended on April 13, 1995. The competition's Final Four was held at Zaragoza.

== Competition system ==
- 40 teams (the cup title holder, national domestic league champions, and a variable number of other clubs from the most important national domestic leagues) played knock-out rounds on a home and away basis. The aggregate score of both games decided the winner.
- The sixteen remaining teams after the knock-out rounds entered the Regular Season Group Stage, divided into two groups of eight teams, playing a round-robin. The final standing was based on individual wins and defeats. In the case of a tie between two or more teams after the group stage, the following criteria were used to decide the final classification: 1) number of wins in one-to-one games between the teams; 2) basket average between the teams; 3) general basket average within the group.
- The top four teams from each group after the Regular Season Group Stage qualified for a Quarterfinal Playoff (X-pairings, best of 3 games).
- The four winners of the Quarterfinal Playoff qualified for the Final Stage (Final Four), which was played at a predetermined venue.

== Team allocation ==
The labels in the parentheses show how each team qualified for the place of its starting round:

- TH: Title holder
- 1st, 2nd, 3rd, 4th, 5th, etc.: League position after eventual Playoffs

Group stage
(Greece) Olympiacos (1st)	(Spain) Real Madrid Teka (1st)		
Second round
(France) Limoges CSP (1st)	(Italy) Buckler Beer Bologna (1st)	(Belgium) Maes Flandria (1st)	(Lithuania) Žalgiris (1st)
(France) Olympique Antibes (2nd)	(Italy) Scavolini Pesaro (2nd)	(Croatia) Cibona (1st)	(Portugal) Benfica (1st)
(Greece) PAOK Bravo (2nd)	(Spain) FCB Banca Catalana (2nd)	(Germany) Bayer 04 Leverkusen (1st)	(Slovenia) Smelt Olimpija (1st)
(Greece) Panathinaikos (3rd)	(Spain) 7up Joventut (3rd)^{TH}	(Israel) Maccabi Elite Tel Aviv (1st)	(Turkey) Efes Pilsen (1st)
First round
(Albania) Adelin Pogradec (1st)	(Czech Republic) Bioveta COOP Banka Brno (1st)	(Israel) Hapoel Tel Aviv (2nd)	(Romania) Dinamo București (1st)
(Austria) UKJ Mollersdorf Traiskirchen (1st)	(England) Thames Valley Tigers (1st)	(Latvia) ASK Brocēni (1st)	(Russia) CSKA Moscow (1st)
(Bosnia and Herzegovina) Sloboda Dita (1st)	(Estonia) Tallinn (1st)	(Luxembourg) Residence (1st)	(Slovakia) Baník Cígeľ Prievidza (1st)
(Bulgaria) Levski Sofia (1st)	(Finland) KTP (1st)	(North Macedonia) Rabotnički (1st)	(Sweden) Kärcher Hisings-Kärra (1st)
Croatia Osiguranje Split (2nd)	(Georgia (country)) Vita Tbilisi (1st)	(Netherlands) Laneche Weert (1st)	(Switzerland) Fidefinanz Bellinzona (1st)
(Cyprus) Pezoporikos-AEK Larnaca (1st)	(Hungary) Danone Honvéd (1st)	(Poland) Śląsk Wroclaw (1st)	(Ukraine) Inpromservis Kyiv (1st)

== First round ==
Team 1	Agg.	Team 2	1st leg	2nd leg
Résidence (Luxembourg)	126–168	(Czech Republic) Bioveta COOP Banka Brno	73–89	53–79
Pezoporikos Larnaca (Cyprus)	40–0^{*}	(Bulgaria) Levski Sofia	20–0	20–0
Sloboda Dita (Bosnia and Herzegovina)	124–180	Croatia Osiguranje	68–99	56–81
Inpromservis Kyiv (Ukraine)	199–153	(Poland) Śląsk Wrocław	100–70	99–83
Vita Tbilisi (Georgia (country))	175–188	(Latvia) ASK Brocēni	80–88	95–100
Adelin Pogradec (Albania)	151–222	(Slovakia) Baník Cígeľ Prievidza	78–99	73–123
Danone Honvéd (Hungary)	163–155	(North Macedonia) Rabotnički	99–82	64–73
Tallinn (Estonia)	168–199	(Sweden) Kärcher Hisings-Kärra	70–105	98–94
Thames Valley Tigers (England)	174–156	(Netherlands) Lanèche Weert	96–94	78–62
Dinamo București (Romania)	129–190	(Russia) CSKA Moscow	64–92	65–98
Möllersdorf Traiskirchen (Austria)	133–178	(Israel) Hapoel Tel Aviv	75–86	58–92
KTP (Finland)	157–197	(Switzerland) Fidefinanz Bellinzona	74–86	83–111

^{*}Levski Sofia withdrew before the first leg and Pezoporikos Larnaca received a forfeit (20–0) in both games.

== Second round ==
Team 1	Agg.	Team 2	1st leg	2nd leg
Bioveta COOP Banka Brno (Czech Republic)	109–155	(France) Limoges CSP	52–71	57–84
Pezoporikos Larnaca (Cyprus)	154–250	(Spain) FC Barcelona Banca Catalana	95–122	59–128
Croatia Osiguranje	142–155	(Germany) Bayer 04 Leverkusen	73–65	69–90
Inpromservis Kyiv (Ukraine)	155–162	(Greece) Panathinaikos	87–79	68–83
ASK Brocēni (Latvia)	156–168	(Spain) 7up Joventut	77–68	79–100
Baník Cígeľ Prievidza (Slovakia)	157–208	(Croatia) Cibona	82–105	75–103
Žalgiris (Lithuania)	150–207	(Italy) Scavolini Pesaro	77–91	73–116
Danone Honvéd (Hungary)	174–190	(Portugal) Benfica	85–94	89–96
Kärcher Hisings-Kärra (Sweden)	144–173	(Turkey) Efes Pilsen	81–85	63–88
Thames Valley Tigers (England)	138–180	(Italy) Buckler Beer Bologna	62–82	76–98
CSKA Moscow (Russia)	178–166	(France) Olympique Antibes	104–77	74–89
Hapoel Tel Aviv (Israel)	148–152	(Greece) PAOK Bravo	82–70	66–82
Fidefinanz Bellinzona (Switzerland)	111–144	(Israel) Maccabi Elite Tel Aviv	49–55	62–89
Smelt Olimpija (Slovenia)	148–136	(Belgium) Maes Flandria	85–61	63–75

== Group stage ==
If one or more clubs are level on won-lost record, tiebreakers are applied in the following order:

1. Head-to-head record in matches between the tied clubs
2. Overall point difference in games between the tied clubs
3. Overall point difference in all group matches (first tiebreaker if tied clubs are not in the same group)
4. Points scored in all group matches
5. Sum of quotients of points scored and points allowed in each group match

Key to colors
Qualified to Playoff
Eliminated

=== Group A ===
	Team	Pld	Pts	W	L	PF	PA	PD
1.	(Greece) Panathinaikos	14	24	10	4	1059	982	+77
2.	(Spain) Real Madrid Teka	14	23	9	5	1052	989	+63
3.	(Russia) CSKA Moscow	14	23	9	5	1203	1162	+41
4.	(Italy) Scavolini Pesaro	14	23	9	5	1148	1108	+40
5.	(Israel) Maccabi Elite Tel Aviv	14	22	8	6	1113	1104	+9
6.	(Greece) PAOK Bravo	14	20	6	8	1037	1046	-9
7.	(Slovenia) Smelt Olimpija	14	17	3	11	1026	1102	-76
8.	(Portugal) Benfica	14	16	2	12	970	1115	-145

=== Group B ===
	Team	Pld	Pts	W	L	PF	PA	PD
1.	(France) Limoges CSP	14	24	10	4	983	911	+72
2.	(Greece) Olympiacos	14	23	9	5	1086	958	+128
3.	(Croatia) Cibona	14	22	8	6	1049	1060	-11
4.	(Italy) Buckler Beer Bologna	14	22	8	6	1072	1023	+49
5.	(Turkey) Efes Pilsen	14	22	8	6	900	912	-12
6.	(Spain) FC Barcelona Banca Catalana	14	22	8	6	1095	1079	+16
7.	(Germany) Bayer 04 Leverkusen	14	18	4	10	1009	1100	-91
8.	(Spain) 7up Joventut	14	15	1	13	923	1074	-151

== Quarterfinals ==
The seed teams played games 2 and 3 at home.

Team 1	Agg.	Team 2	1st leg	2nd leg	3rd leg
Buckler Beer Bologna (Italy)	1–2	(Greece) Panathinaikos	85–68	55–63	56–99
Cibona (Croatia)	0–2	(Spain) Real Madrid Teka	78–82	70–82	
Scavolini Pesaro (Italy)	1–2	(France) Limoges CSP	68–55	66–79	72–82
CSKA Moscow (Russia)	1–2	(Greece) Olympiacos	95–65	77–86	54–79

== Final four ==
=== Semifinals ===
April 11, Pabellón Príncipe Felipe, Zaragoza

Team 1	Score	Team 2
Real Madrid Teka (Spain)	62–49	(France) Limoges CSP
Panathinaikos (Greece)	52–58	(Greece) Olympiacos

=== 3rd place game ===
April 13, Pabellón Príncipe Felipe, Zaragoza

Team 1	Score	Team 2
Limoges CSP (France)	77–91	(Greece) Panathinaikos

=== Final ===
April 13, Pabellón Príncipe Felipe, Zaragoza

Team 1	Score	Team 2
Real Madrid Teka (Spain)	73–61	(Greece) Olympiacos

1994–95 FIBA European League Champions

Real Madrid Teka
8th title

=== Final standings ===
	Team
	(Spain) Real Madrid Teka
2nd place, silver medalist(s)	(Greece) Olympiacos
3rd place, bronze medalist(s)	(Greece) Panathinaikos
	(France) Limoges CSP

== Awards ==
=== FIBA European League Top Scorer ===
- (Federal Republic of Yugoslavia) Predrag Danilović ( (Italy) Buckler Bologna)

=== FIBA European League Final Four MVP ===
- (Lithuania) Arvydas Sabonis ( (Spain) Real Madrid Teka)

=== FIBA European League Finals Top Scorer ===
- (Lithuania) Arvydas Sabonis ( (Spain) Real Madrid Teka)

=== FIBA European League All-Final Four Team ===
FIBA European League All-Final Four Team
Player	Team	Ref.
(Spain) José Miguel Antúnez	Real Madrid Teka	
(Spain) Ismael Santos	Real Madrid Teka	
(United States) Eddie Johnson	Olympiacos	
(United States) Joe Arlauckas	Real Madrid Teka	
(Lithuania) Arvydas Sabonis (MVP)	Real Madrid Teka	

== See also ==
- 1994–95 FIBA European Cup
- 1994–95 FIBA Korać Cup
