= Ignacio Suárez =

Ignacio Suárez may refer to:

- Ignacio Suárez (basketball), Spanish basketball player
- Ignacio Suárez (footballer), Uruguayan footballer
- Ignacio Suárez Llanos, Spanish painter and illustrator
- Ignacio Suarez (Ugly Betty), a character on the TV series Ugly Betty
