= Ronald Draper =

Ronald Draper may refer to:

- Ronald Draper (cricketer) (1926–2025), South African cricketer
- Ronald Draper (basketball) (born 1967), American basketball player
