= 1996–97 FIBA EuroCup =

- League: FIBA EuroCup
- Sport: Basketball

Final
- Champions: (Spain) Real Madrid Teka
- Runners-up: (Italy) Mash Jeans Verona
- Finals MVP: (Spain) Alberto Herreros

FIBA EuroCup seasons
- ← 1995–96 1997–98 →

The 1996–97 FIBA EuroCup was the thirty-first edition of FIBA's 2nd-tier level European-wide professional club basketball competition. it occurred between September 17, 1996, and April 15, 1997. The competition was won by Real Madrid Teka, who beat Mash Jeans Verona, by a score of 78–64 in the final.

== Competition system ==
- 48 teams (national domestic cup champions, plus the best qualified teams from the most important European national domestic leagues), entered a preliminary group stage, divided into eight groups of six teams each, and played a round-robin. The final standings were based on individual wins and defeats. In the case of a tie between two or more teams, after the group stage, the following criteria were used to decide the final classification: 1) number of wins in one-to-one games between the teams; 2) basket average between the teams; 3) general basket average within the group.
- The top four teams from each group qualified for a 1/16 Final Playoff (X-pairings, home and away games), where the winners advanced further to 1/8 Finals, 1/4 Finals, and 1/2 Final.
- The Final was played at a predetermined venue.

== Country ranking ==
For the 1996–1997 FIBA EuroCup, the countries are allocated places according to their place on the FIBA country rankings, which takes into account their performance in European competitions from 1993–94 to 1995–96.

Country ranking for 1996–1997 EuroCup

Rank	Country	Points	Teams	Notes
1	Spain	321.667	2	
2	Greece	299.667	2	
3	Italy	216.667	2	
4	France	123.238	2	
5	Turkey	93.333	2	
6	Russia	66	2	
7	Croatia	63	2	
8	Germany	61.389	2	
9	Israel	50.905	2	
10	Slovenia	41.333	2	
11	Belgium	29	2	
12	Yugoslavia	26	2	
13	Portugal	24.5	2	
14	Lithuania	19	2	-1, Atletas withdrew
15	Ukraine	15.389	2	
16	Poland	12.111	2	
17	Macedonia	11.778	1	+1, MZT got wild card
18	Hungary	10.5	1	
19	Slovakia	8.889	1	

Rank	Country	Points	Teams	Notes
20	Czech Republic	8.389	1	
21	Austria	6.556	1	
22	Switzerland	6.056	1	-1, Monthey withdrew
23	England	5.389	1	
24	Cyprus	5	1	+1, Achilleas got wild card
25	Sweden	4.722	1	
26	Bulgaria	4	1	
27	Latvia	3.667	1	
28	Romania	2.778	1	
29	Bosnia and Herzegovina	2.5	1	
30	Luxembourg	2.167	1	-1, Hiefenech withdrew
31	Netherlands	1.944	1	
32	Georgia	1.833	1	
33	Finland	1.667	0	+1, Torpan Pojat got wild card
34	Estonia	1.5	0	
35	Albania	1.444	0	
36	Iceland	0.889	0	
37	Belarus	0.278	0	
38	Denmark	0.167	0	

== Team allocation ==
The labels in the parentheses show how each team qualified for the place of its starting round:

- 1st, 2nd, 3rd, 4th, 5th, etc.: League position after Regular season or eventual Playoffs
- CW: Cup winners
- WC: Wild card

Regular season
(Spain) TDK Manresa (CW)	(Croatia) Zagreb (5th)	(Portugal) Porto (1st)	(Austria) UKJ SÜBA Sankt Pölten (1st)
(Spain) Real Madrid Teka (5th)	(Croatia) Zadar (9th)	(Portugal) Benfica (CW)	(England) London Towers (CW)
(Greece) Dexim Apollon Patras (8th)	(Germany) Ratiopharm Ulm (CW)	(Ukraine) Budivelnyk (1st)	(Cyprus) APOEL (1st)
(Greece) Iraklis (9th)	(Germany) SSV Brandt Hagen (6th)	(Ukraine) Shakhtar Donetsk (2nd)	(Cyprus) Achilleas Kaimakli (WC)
(Italy) Scavolini Pesaro (7th)	(Israel) Hapoel Jerusalem (CW)	(Poland) Śląsk Wrocław (1st)	(Sweden) New Wave Sharks (1st)
(Italy) Mash Jeans Verona (10th)	(Israel) Hapoel Galil Elyon (3rd)	(Poland) WTK Nobiles Włocławek (CW)	(Bulgaria) Plama Pleven (1st)
(France) Olympique Antibes (4th)	(Slovenia) Kovinotehna Savinjska Polzela (CW)	(North Macedonia) Rabotnički (1st)	(Latvia) Rīgas ASK (1st)
(France) PSG Racing Basket (5th)	(Slovenia) Bavaria Wolltex Maribor (7th)	(North Macedonia) MZT Skopje (WC)	(Romania) Universitatea Cluj (1st)
(Turkey) Fenerbahçe (3rd)	(Belgium) Sunair Oostende (2nd)	(Lithuania) Žalgiris (1st)	(Bosnia and Herzegovina) Sloboda Dita (CW)
(Turkey) Türk Telekom PTT (8th)	(Belgium) AST Gent	(Hungary) Marc-Körmend (1st)	(Netherlands) Libertel EBBC (1st)
(Russia) Avtodor Saratov (3rd)	(Federal Republic of Yugoslavia) BFC Beočin (2nd)	(Slovakia) AŠK Inter Slovnaft (1st)	(Georgia (country)) Vita Tbilisi (1st)
(Russia) Akvarius Volgograd (4th)	(Federal Republic of Yugoslavia) Budućnost (CW)	(Czech Republic) Stavex Brno (1st)	(Finland) Torpan Pojat (WC)

== Preliminary group stage ==
Key to colors
Qualified to Round of 32
Eliminated

=== Group A ===
	Team	Pld	Pts	W	L	PF	PA	PD
1.	(Turkey) Fenerbahçe	10	18	8	2	883	792	+91
2.	(Latvia) Rīgas ASK	10	16	6	4	943	896	+47
3.	(Poland) Nobiles Włocławek	10	16	6	4	853	864	−11
4.	(Slovenia) Kovinotehna Savinjska Polzela	10	15	5	5	835	851	−16
5.	(Italy) Scavolini Pesaro	10	14	4	6	831	847	−16
6.	(North Macedonia) Rabotnički	10	11	1	9	776	871	−95

=== Group B ===
	Team	Pld	Pts	W	L	PF	PA	PD
1.	(Lithuania) Žalgiris	10	17	7	3	733	627	+106
2.	(Croatia) Zagreb	10	17	7	3	755	709	+46
3.	(France) Olympique Antibes	10	16	6	4	724	709	+15
4.	(Slovenia) Bavaria Wolltex	10	15	5	5	764	764	0
5.	(Austria) SÜBA Sankt Pölten	10	14	4	6	738	741	−3
6.	(Bosnia and Herzegovina) Sloboda Dita	10	11	1	9	679	843	−64

=== Group C ===
	Team	Pld	Pts	W	L	PF	PA	PD
1.	(Spain) Real Madrid Teka	10	17	7	3	815	715	+100
2.	(Germany) Ratiopharm Ulm	10	15	5	5	875	844	+31
3.	(Portugal) Benfica	10	15	5	5	799	790	+9
4.	(North Macedonia) MZT Skopje	10	15	5	5	778	814	−36
5.	(Israel) Hapoel Galil Elyon	10	14	4	6	823	840	−17
6.	(Bulgaria) Plama Pleven	10	14	4	6	892	979	−87

=== Group D ===
	Team	Pld	Pts	W	L	PF	PA	PD
1.	(Portugal) Porto	10	20	10	0	866	721	+145
2.	(France) PSG Racing Basket	10	17	7	3	872	697	+175
3.	(Israel) Hapoel Jerusalem	10	17	7	3	851	806	+45
4.	(Germany) Brandt Hagen	10	14	4	6	768	794	−26
5.	(Sweden) New Wave Sharks	10	11	1	9	731	865	−134
6.	(Cyprus) APOEL	10	11	1	9	626	831	−205

=== Group E ===
	Team	Pld	Pts	W	L	PF	PA	PD
1.	(Greece) Iraklis	10	18	8	2	914	775	+139
2.	(Poland) Śląsk Wrocław	10	17	7	3	853	811	+42
3.	(Belgium) AST Gent	10	16	6	4	803	770	+33
4.	(Croatia) Zadar	10	16	6	4	817	810	+7
5.	(Netherlands) Libertel EBBC	10	13	3	7	847	895	−48
6.	(Cyprus) Achilleas Kaimakli	10	10	0	10	760	933	−173

=== Group F ===
	Team	Pld	Pts	W	L	PF	PA	PD
1.	(Greece) Dexim Apollon Patras	10	18	8	2	924	761	+163
2.	(Ukraine) Budivelnyk	10	18	8	2	849	718	+131
3.	(Belgium) Sunair Oostende	10	17	7	3	825	701	+124
4.	(Czech Republic) Stavex Brno	10	14	4	6	822	815	+7
5.	(Russia) Akvarius Volgograd	10	13	3	7	760	878	−118
6.	(Romania) Universitatea Cluj	10	10	0	10	702	1009	−307

=== Group G ===
	Team	Pld	Pts	W	L	PF	PA	PD
1.	(Russia) Avtodor Saratov	10	19	9	1	871	810	+61
2.	(Spain) TDK Manresa	10	16	6	4	853	766	+87
3.	(Finland) Torpan Pojat	10	16	6	4	858	808	+50
4.	(Federal Republic of Yugoslavia) BFC Beočin	10	16	6	4	809	738	+71
5.	(Ukraine) Shakhtar Donetsk	10	12	2	8	788	922	−134
6.	(Slovakia) Inter Slovnaft	10	11	1	9	755	890	−135

=== Group H ===
	Team	Pld	Pts	W	L	PF	PA	PD
1.	(Italy) Mash Jeans Verona	10	18	8	2	816	700	+116
2.	(Turkey) Türk Telekom PTT	10	17	7	3	750	711	+39
3.	(Hungary) Marc-Körmend	10	16	6	4	828	825	+3
4.	(England) London Towers	10	14	4	6	713	731	−18
5.	(Federal Republic of Yugoslavia) Budućnost	10	13	3	7	803	809	−6
6.	(Georgia (country)) Vita Tbilisi	10	12	2	8	729	863	−134

== Round of 32 ==
Team 1	Agg.	Team 2	1st leg	2nd leg
Bavaria Wolltex (Slovenia)	143–155	(Turkey) Fenerbahçe	67–69	76–86
Olympique Antibes (France)	155–161	(Latvia) Rīgas ASK	75–75	80–86
Nobiles Włocławek (Poland)	167–164	(Croatia) Zagreb	84–79	83–85
Kovinotehna Savinjska Polzela (Slovenia)	147–149	(Lithuania) Žalgiris	71–76	76–73
Brandt Hagen (Germany)	151–184	(Spain) Real Madrid Teka	71–98	80–86
Hapoel Jerusalem (Israel)	186–177	(Germany) Ratiopharm Ulm	99–97	87–80
Benfica (Portugal)	149–161	(France) PSG Racing Basket	63–81	86–80
MZT Skopje (North Macedonia)	147–149	(Portugal) Porto	73–69	74–80
Stavex Brno (Czech Republic)	147–154	(Greece) Iraklis	86–78	61–76
Sunair Oostende (Belgium)	134–150	(Poland) Śląsk Wrocław	66–62	68–88
AST Gent (Belgium)	124–171	(Ukraine) Budivelnyk	65–70	59–101
Zadar (Croatia)	120–157	(Greece) Dexim Apollon Patras	56–75	64–82
London Towers (England)	138–143	(Russia) Avtodor Saratov	70–75	68–68
Marc-Körmend (Hungary)	162–166	(Spain) TDK Manresa	83–77	79–89
Torpan Pojat (Finland)	171–180	(Turkey) Türk Telekom PTT	82–84	89–96
BFC Beočin (Federal Republic of Yugoslavia)	161–168	(Italy) Mash Jeans Verona	73–74	88–94

== Round of 16 ==
Team 1	Agg.	Team 2	1st leg	2nd leg
Hapoel Jerusalem (Israel)	148–147	(Turkey) Fenerbahçe	91–78	57–69
PSG Racing Basket (France)	137–134	(Lithuania) Žalgiris	60–58	77–76
Rīgas ASK (Latvia)	171–182	(Spain) Real Madrid Teka	83–98	88–84
Nobiles Włocławek (Poland)	156–176	(Portugal) Porto	91–81	65–95
TDK Manresa (Spain)	132–140	(Greece) Iraklis	74–79	58–61
Türk Telekom PTT (Turkey)	155–140	(Greece) Dexim Apollon Patras	89–73	66–67
Śląsk Wrocław (Poland)	194–189	(Russia) Avtodor Saratov	90–94	104–95
Budivelnyk (Ukraine)	153–180	(Italy) Mash Jeans Verona	80–90	73–90

== Quarterfinals ==
Team 1	Agg.	Team 2	1st leg	2nd leg
Hapoel Jerusalem (Israel)	126–133	(Greece) Iraklis	68–63	58–70
Türk Telekom PTT (Turkey)	122–184	(France) PSG Racing Basket	72–92	50–92
Real Madrid Teka (Spain)	205–157	(Poland) Śląsk Wrocław	112–66	93–91
Mash Jeans Verona (Italy)	168–138	(Portugal) Porto	96–78	72–60

== Semifinals ==
Team 1	Agg.	Team 2	1st leg	2nd leg
Mash Jeans Verona (Italy)	152–138	(Greece) Iraklis	96–62	56–76
Real Madrid Teka (Spain)	120–113	(France) PSG Racing Basket	62–57	58–56

== Final ==
April 15, Eleftheria Indoor Hall, Nicosia

Team 1	Score	Team 2
Mash Jeans Verona (Italy)	64–78	(Spain) Real Madrid Teka

== Rosters ==
(Italy) Scaligera Verona: Mike Iuzzolino, Roberto Bullara, Randolph Keys, Roberto Dalla Vecchia, Alessandro Boni (C); David Londero, Joachim Jerichow, Giacomo Galanda, Fabio Capelli. Coach: Andrea Mazzon
(Spain) Real Madrid: Ismael Santos, Dejan Bodiroga, Alberto Herreros, Joe Arlauckas, Juan Antonio Orenga; Pablo Laso, Alberto Angulo, Jose Miguel Antunez (C), Juan Antonio Morales, Mike Smith. Coach: Zeljko Obradovic

1996–97 FIBA EuroCup Champions

Real Madrid Teka
4th title

== Awards ==
=== FIBA Saporta Cup Finals MVP ===
- (Spain) Alberto Herreros ( (Spain) Real Madrid Teka)

== See also ==
- 1996–97 FIBA Euroleague
- 1996–97 FIBA Korać Cup
