= 1995–96 FIBA European League =

- League: FIBA European League
- Sport: Basketball

Regular Season
- Top scorer: (United States) Joe Arlauckas (Real Madrid)

Final Four
- Champions: (Greece) Panathinaikos (1st title)
- Runners-up: (Spain) FC Barcelona Banca Catalana
- Final Four MVP: (United States) Dominique Wilkins (Panathinaikos)

FIBA European League seasons
- ← 1994–95 1996–97 →

The 1995–96 FIBA European League, also shortened to 1995–96 FIBA EuroLeague, was the 39th installment of the European top-tier level professional club competition for basketball clubs (now called EuroLeague). It began on September 7, 1995, and ended on April 11, 1996. Panathinaikos B.C. became the first Greek team to lift the FIBA European League championship after beating FC Barcelona Banca Catalana by one point in the final match of the competition's Final Four, which was held at Paris.

The 1995–96 season saw the return of 1991-92 European League champion Partizan on the international scene, after three years ban of Yugoslav clubs due to UN embargo. However, Partizan was eliminated in the qualifying rounds.

It was the last season of the competition that took place under the name of FIBA European League, as the competition was renamed to FIBA EuroLeague, starting with the next season.

== Competition system ==
- 42 teams (the cup title holder, national domestic league champions, and a variable number of other clubs from the most important national domestic leagues) played knock-out rounds on a home and away basis. The aggregate score of both games decided the winner.
- The sixteen remaining teams after the knock-out rounds entered the Regular Season Group Stage, divided into two groups of eight teams, playing a round-robin. The final standing was based on individual wins and defeats. In the case of a tie between two or more teams after the group stage, the following criteria were used to decide the final classification: 1) number of wins in one-to-one games between the teams; 2) basket average between the teams; 3) general basket average within the group.
- The top four teams from each group after the Regular Season Group Stage qualified for a quarterfinal playoff (X-pairings, best of 3 games).
- The four winners of the quarterfinal playoff qualified for the final stage (Final Four), which was played at a predetermined venue.

== Country ranking ==
For the 1995–1996 FIBA European League, the countries are allocated places according to their place on the FIBA country rankings, which takes into account their performance in European competitions from 1992–93 to 1994–95.

Country ranking for 1995–1996 FIBA European League

| Rank | Country | 1992-93 | 1993-94 | 1994-95 | Average |
|---|---|---|---|---|---|
| 1 | Spain | 212 | 340 | 300 | 284,00 |
| 2 | Greece | 253 | 322 | 249,375 | 274,79 |
| 3 | Italy | 363 | 173 | 260 | 265,33 |
| 4 | France | 219 | 123 | 179 | 173,67 |
| 5 | Croatia | 62,86 | 70 | 68 | 66,95 |
| 6 | Turkey | 58,33 | 73 | 69 | 66,78 |
| 7 | Germany | 37 | 45 | 103 | 61,67 |
| 8 | Israel | 66 | 48 | 61 | 58,33 |
| 9 | Slovenia | 24 | 72,5 | 27,5 | 41,33 |
| 10 | Belgium | 51 | 37 | 24 | 37,33 |
| 11 | Russia | 12 | 10 | 59 | 27,00 |
| 12 | Portugal | 9 | 21 | 25,83 | 18,61 |
| 13 | Ukraine | 15,33 | 13 | 27 | 18,44 |
| 14 | Czech Republic | 13 | 13 | 11 | 12,33 |
| 15 | Hungary | 5,33 | 7,5 | 18 | 10,28 |
| 16 | Poland | 4,5 | 4 | 18,33 | 8,94 |
| 17 | Macedonia | 0 | 20 | 6 | 8,67 |
| 18 | Switzerland | 6 | 9 | 8,5 | 7,83 |
| 19 | Slovakia | 0 | 10 | 8,33 | 6,11 |
| 20 | Romania | 11 | 2 | 4,67 | 5,89 |
| 21 | Lithuania | 3 | 2 | 12 | 5,67 |
| 22 | Latvia | 6 | 2 | 9 | 5,67 |

| Rank | Country | 1992-93 | 1993-94 | 1994-95 | Average |
|---|---|---|---|---|---|
| 23 | Bulgaria | 7,5 | 5,67 | 1,33 | 4,83 |
| 24 | Cyprus | 5,33 | 5,33 | 3 | 4,55 |
| 25 | Austria | 1 | 6 | 4,67 | 3,89 |
| 26 | Luxembourg | 4 | 2 | 2 | 2,67 |
| 27 | Sweden | 0,37 | 1 | 6 | 2,46 |
| 28 | Finland | 3,5 | 1,67 | 2 | 2,39 |
| 29 | England | 0,67 | 4,17 | 2 | 2,28 |
| 30 | Netherlands | 1,67 | 2,33 | 2,5 | 2,17 |
| 31 | Georgia | 2 | 0 | 3,33 | 1,78 |
| 32 | Albania | 1 | 0,67 | 2 | 1,22 |
| 33 | Iceland | 0,33 | 2,5 | 0,2 | 1,01 |
| 34 | Estonia | 1 | 0,33 | 1,67 | 1,00 |
| 35 | Bosnia and Herzegovina | 0 | 0 | 2 | 0,67 |
| 36 | Belarus | 0,4 | 0,5 | 0 | 0,30 |
| 37 | Armenia | 0,4 | 0 | 0 | 0,13 |
| 38 | Moldova | 0 | 0,2 | 0,2 | 0,13 |
| 39 | Denmark | 0 | 0 | 0,2 | 0,07 |
| 40 | Ireland | 0 | 0,2 | 0 | 0,07 |
| 41 | Wales | 0 | 0,2 | 0 | 0,07 |
| 42 | Malta | 0,2 | 0 | 0 | 0,07 |
| 43 | FR Yugoslavia (banned) | 0 | 0 | 0 | 0 |

== Team allocation ==
The labels in the parentheses show how each team qualified for the place of its starting round:

- TH: Title holder.
- 1st, 2nd, 3rd, etc.: League position after Playoffs.

Group stage
| (Spain) FCB Banca Catalana (1st) | (Greece) Olympiacos (1st) | (France) Olympique Antibes (1st) | |
Second round
| (Spain) Unicaja (2nd) | (Italy) Buckler Beer Bologna (1st) | (Germany) Bayer 04 Leverkusen (1st) | (Portugal) Benfica (1st) |
| (Spain) Real Madrid Teka (3rd)^{TH} | (Italy) Benetton Treviso (2nd) | (Israel) Maccabi Elite Tel Aviv (1st) | |
| (Greece) Panathinaikos (2nd) | (Croatia) Cibona (1st) | (Slovenia) Smelt Olimpija (1st) | |
| (Greece) Iraklis Aspis Pronoia (3rd) | (Turkey) Ülker Genclik (1st) | (Russia) CSKA Moscow (1st) | |
First round
| (France) Pau-Orthez (2nd) | (Poland) Mazowzanka (1st) | (Cyprus) APOEL (1st) | (Georgia (country)) Vita Tbilisi (1st) |
| (Croatia) Zrinjevac (2nd) | (North Macedonia) Rabotnički (1st) | (Austria) UKJ SUBA Sankt Pölten (1st) | (Albania) Dinamo Tirana (1st) |
| (Israel) Hapoel Galil Elyon (2nd) | (Switzerland) Fidefinanz Bellinzona (1st) | (Luxembourg) Résidence (1st) | (Estonia) Kalev Tallinn (1st) |
| (Belgium) Sunair Oostende (1st) | (Slovakia) Baník Cígeľ Prievidza (1st) | (Sweden) Alvik (1st) | (Bosnia and Herzegovina) Zenica Metalno (1st) |
| (Ukraine) Budivelnyk (1st) | (Romania) CSU Forest Sibiu (1st) | (Finland) Kouvot (1st) | (Federal Republic of Yugoslavia) Partizan Inex (1st) |
| (Czech Republic) Stavex Brno (1st) | (Lithuania) Žalgiris (1st) | (England) Sheffield Sharks (1st) | |
| (Hungary) Danone-Honvéd (1st) | (Bulgaria) Plama Pleven (1st) | (Netherlands) Rene Coltof Den Helder (1st) | |

== First round ==
| Team 1 | Agg. | Team 2 | 1st leg | 2nd leg |
|---|---|---|---|---|
| Vita Tbilisi (Georgia (country)) | 139–178 | (Lithuania) Žalgiris | 70–78 | 69–100 |
| Stavex Brno (Czech Republic) | 175–186 | (Switzerland) Fidefinanz Bellinzona | 106–93 | 69–93 |
| Kalev (Estonia) | 174–138 | (Hungary) Danone-Honvéd | 78–57 | 96–81 |
| Dinamo Tirana (Albania) | 130–156 | (Romania) Forest Sibiu | 63–87 | 67–69 |
| SUBA Sankt Pölten (Austria) | 131–153 | (Cyprus) APOEL | 60–67 | 71–86 |
| Zenica Metalno (Bosnia and Herzegovina) | 136–142 | (Slovakia) Baník Cígeľ Prievidza | 68–71 | 68–71 |
| Sunair Oostende (Belgium) | 156–125 | (Sweden) Alvik | 79–61 | 77–64 |
| Résidence (Luxembourg) | 161–184 | (England) Sheffield Sharks | 79–99 | 82–85 |
| Kouvot (Finland) | 173–185 | (Israel) Hapoel Galil Elyon | 92–82 | 81–103 |
| Rabotnički (North Macedonia) | 134–147 | (Ukraine) Budivelnyk | 65–64 | 69–83 |
| Mazowzanka (Poland) | 147–167 | (Croatia) Zrinjevac | 79–74 | 68–93 |
| Plama Pleven (Bulgaria) | 178–185 | (Federal Republic of Yugoslavia) Partizan Inex | 83–93 | 95–92 |
| Rene Coltof Den Helder (Netherlands) | 139–182 | (France) Pau-Orthez | 72–94 | 57–88 |

== Second round ==
| Team 1 | Agg. | Team 2 | 1st leg | 2nd leg |
|---|---|---|---|---|
| Žalgiris (Lithuania) | 122–145 | (Greece) Panathinaikos | 56–59 | 66–86 |
| Fidefinanz Bellinzona (Switzerland) | 162–223 | (Russia) CSKA Moscow | 88–107 | 74–116 |
| Kalev (Estonia) | 148–172 | (Italy) Buckler Beer Bologna | 65–81 | 83–91 |
| Forest Sibiu (Romania) | 139–221 | (Israel) Maccabi Elite Tel Aviv | 74–99 | 65–122 |
| APOEL (Cyprus) | 116–139 | (Croatia) Cibona | 70–82 | 46–57 |
| Baník Cígeľ Prievidza (Slovakia) | 162–184 | (Italy) Benetton Treviso | 87–91 | 75–93 |
| Sunair Oostende (Belgium) | 149–155 | (Turkey) Ülker | 74–69 | 75–86 |
| Sheffield Sharks (England) | 132–145 | (Spain) Real Madrid Teka | 57–67 | 75–78 |
| Hapoel Galil Elyon (Israel) | 137–176 | (Greece) Iraklis Aspis Pronoia | 83–91 | 54–76 |
| Budivelnyk (Ukraine) | 161–179 | (Germany) Bayer 04 Leverkusen | 98–77 | 63–102 |
| Zrinjevac (Croatia) | 136–165 | (Spain) Unicaja | 70–85 | 66–80 |
| Partizan Inex (Federal Republic of Yugoslavia) | 159–176 | (Portugal) Benfica | 64–64 | 95–112 |
| Pau-Orthez (France) | 193–146 | (Slovenia) Smelt Olimpija | 96–71 | 97–75 |

== Group stage ==
If one or more clubs are level on won-lost record, tiebreakers are applied in the following order:

1. Head-to-head record in matches between the tied clubs
2. Overall point difference in games between the tied clubs
3. Overall point difference in all group matches (first tiebreaker if tied clubs are not in the same group)
4. Points scored in all group matches
5. Sum of quotients of points scored and points allowed in each group match

Key to colors
| Qualified to Playoff |
| Eliminated |

=== Group A ===
| | Team | Pld | Pts | W | L | PF | PA | PD |
|---|---|---|---|---|---|---|---|---|
| 1. | (Russia) CSKA Moscow | 14 | 24 | 10 | 4 | 1162 | 1081 | +81 |
| 2. | (Italy) Benetton Treviso | 14 | 24 | 10 | 4 | 1157 | 1096 | +61 |
| 3. | (Greece) Olympiacos | 14 | 24 | 10 | 4 | 1132 | 1046 | +86 |
| 4. | (Turkey) Ülker | 14 | 20 | 6 | 8 | 1078 | 1104 | +26 |
| 5. | (Spain) Unicaja | 14 | 20 | 6 | 8 | 1104 | 1081 | +23 |
| 6. | (France) Olympique Antibes | 14 | 20 | 6 | 8 | 1108 | 1169 | -61 |
| 7. | (Germany) Bayer 04 Leverkusen | 14 | 19 | 5 | 9 | 1067 | 1112 | -45 |
| 8. | (Greece) Iraklis Aspis Pronoia | 14 | 17 | 3 | 11 | 945 | 1064 | -119 |

=== Group B ===
| | Team | Pld | Pts | W | L | PF | PA | PD |
|---|---|---|---|---|---|---|---|---|
| 1. | (Spain) FC Barcelona Banca Catalana | 14 | 24 | 10 | 4 | 1145 | 1077 | +68 |
| 2. | (Spain) Real Madrid Teka | 14 | 23 | 9 | 5 | 1108 | 1079 | +29 |
| 3. | (Greece) Panathinaikos | 14 | 23 | 9 | 5 | 1035 | 1007 | +28 |
| 4. | (France) Pau-Orthez | 14 | 22 | 8 | 6 | 1127 | 1092 | +35 |
| 5. | (Italy) Buckler Beer Bologna | 14 | 20 | 6 | 8 | 1181 | 1149 | +32 |
| 6. | (Israel) Maccabi Elite Tel Aviv | 14 | 20 | 6 | 8 | 1105 | 1143 | -38 |
| 7. | (Croatia) Cibona | 14 | 20 | 6 | 8 | 1011 | 1052 | -41 |
| 8. | (Portugal) Benfica | 14 | 16 | 2 | 12 | 1046 | 1159 | -113 |

== Quarterfinals ==
| Team 1 | Agg. | Team 2 | 1st leg | 2nd leg | 3rd leg |
|---|---|---|---|---|---|
| Pau-Orthez (France) | 1–2 | (Russia) CSKA Moscow | 78–65 | 89–104 | 74–83 |
| Panathinaikos (Greece) | 2–1 | (Italy) Benetton Treviso | 70–67 | 69–83 | 65–64 |
| Ülker (Turkey) | 0–2 | (Spain) FC Barcelona Banca Catalana | 77–105 | 66–96 | |
| Olympiacos (Greece) | 1–2 | (Spain) Real Madrid Teka | 68–49 | 77–80 | 65–80 |

== Final four ==
=== Semifinals ===
April 9, Palais Omnisports de Paris-Bercy, Paris

| Team 1 | Score | Team 2 |
|---|---|---|
| CSKA Moscow (Russia) | 71–81 | (Greece) Panathinaikos |
| FC Barcelona Banca Catalana (Spain) | 76–66 | (Spain) Real Madrid Teka |

=== 3rd place game ===
April 11, Palais Omnisports de Paris-Bercy, Paris

| Team 1 | Score | Team 2 |
|---|---|---|
| CSKA Moscow (Russia) | 74–73 | (Spain) Real Madrid Teka |

=== Final ===
April 11, Palais Omnisports de Paris-Bercy, Paris

| Team 1 | Score | Team 2 |
|---|---|---|
| Panathinaikos (Greece) | 67–66 | (Spain) FC Barcelona Banca Catalana |

1995–96 FIBA European League Champions

Panathinaikos
1st Title

=== Final standings ===
| | Team |
|---|---|
| | (Greece) Panathinaikos |
| 2nd place, silver medalist(s) | (Spain) FC Barcelona Banca Catalana |
| 3rd place, bronze medalist(s) | (Russia) CSKA Moscow |
| | (Spain) Real Madrid Teka |

== Awards ==
=== FIBA European League Top Scorer ===
- (United States) Joe Arlauckas ( (Spain) Real Madrid Teka)

=== FIBA European League Final Four MVP ===
- (United States) Dominique Wilkins ( (Greece) Panathinaikos)

=== FIBA European League Finals Top Scorer ===
- (Lithuania) Artūras Karnišovas ( (Spain) FC Barcelona Banca Catalana)

=== FIBA European League All-Final Four Team ===
FIBA European League All-Final Four Team
| Player | Team | Ref. |
| (Russia) Vasily Karasev | CSKA Moscow | |
| (Greece) Fragiskos Alvertis | Panathinaikos | |
| (Lithuania) Artūras Karnišovas | FC Barcelona Banca Catalana | |
| (United States) Dominique Wilkins (MVP) | Panathinaikos | |
| (Croatia) Stojko Vranković | Panathinaikos | |

== See also ==
- 1995–96 FIBA European Cup
- 1995–96 FIBA Korać Cup
