= Miguel Angel Reyes =

American artist and professor of art (born 1964)

Miguel Angel Reyes (born 1964) is an American artist and professor of art.

Reyes was born in Colima, Mexico in 1964. He emigrated with his family in 1975 to the United States and took up residing in Southern California. He received a BFA in illustration from the Otis Art Institute/Parsons School of Design. In 1993, he worked for a season as a jazz and modern dancer for the San Diego Dance Theater. He is openly gay.

== Work ==
In 1995, he completed a 750-foot mural, one of the largest mural projects in Los Angeles, at the corner of Hollywood Boulevard and Argyle titled Amistades (Friendships). It was commissioned by the Los Angeles County Metropolitan Transportation Authority. The mural was removed with the opening of the Hollywood segment of the Metro Red Line in 1999.

Reyes has had fifteen solo exhibits and has been featured in over a hundred group shows throughout the United States, Mexico, Europe and Asia since 1989. He has also shown in major museums.

He is a portrait and figurative painter, muralist, printmaker, and illustrator.

As a regular contributor to a range of causes such as Project Angel Food, Self-Help Graphics, and Central America Resource Center (CARECEN), he not only contributes artwork but also his time and experience.

He currently is instructor of model drawing in the Fashion Department of the Otis College of Art.
