= Enrique Villalobos =

Spanish basketball player

Enrique Villalobos Brassart (born 20 November 1965 in Madrid, Spain) is a retired basketball player. He played eight times with the Spain national team.

== Clubs ==
- 1983-84: Real Canoe
- 1984-86: CB Málaga
- 1986-88: Cajamadrid
- 1988-92: Real Madrid
- 1992-93: Saski Baskonia
- 1993-97: BC Andorra
- 1997-98: CB Granada
- 1998-99: Cholet Basket
- 1999-00: Olympique Antibes

== Awards ==
- Copa del Rey (1): 1988-89
- Saporta Cup (2): 1988-89, 1991–92
- French Cup (1): 1998-99
