= Juan Miguel Alonso =

Spanish basketball player

Juan Miguel Alonso Vázquez
Personal information
- Born: 19 February 1962 (age 63); San Sebastián, Spain
- Listed height: 1.84 m (6 ft 0 in)

Juan Miguel Alonso Vázquez (born 19 February 1962 in San Sebastián, Spain) is a retired basketball player.

== Clubs ==
- 1985-86/1989-92: CB Breogán

== Bibliography ==
- ACB profile
- BREOGAN records
