= Steve Trumbo =

American basketball player

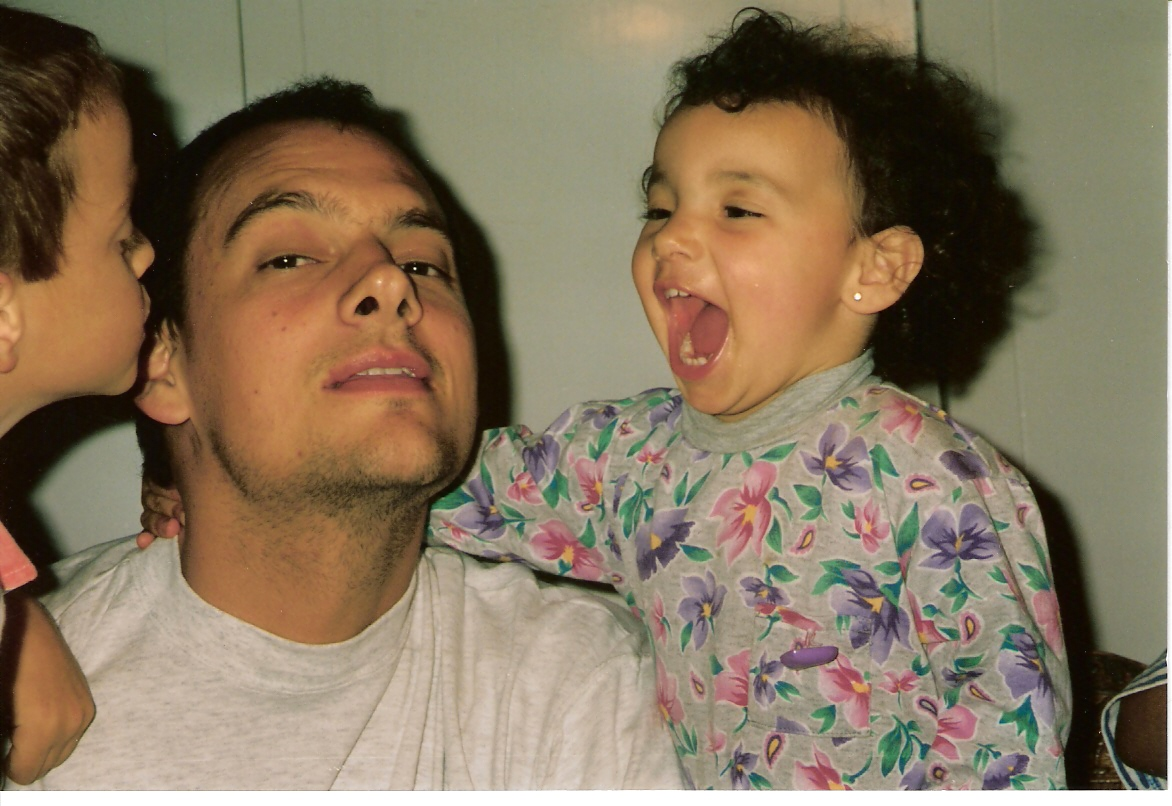
Trumbo and his children, Axel and Dakota

Esteban Dale Trumbo Hawkes, commonly known as Steve Trumbo (born May 20, 1960), is an American former professional basketball player, with Spanish citizenship. At a height of 6'9'' he played at the center position. He was best known for his success in rebounding (was the best in rebounds in the Liga ACB two years in a row), and his great capacity for effort on the court, especially defensively.

== College career ==
Trumbo played college basketball at Brigham Young University, where he did very well in the college level.

== Professional career ==
Trumbo was chosen in the third round of the 1982 NBA draft, (number 49 overall), by the Utah Jazz. However, he did not end up making it into the NBA. He signing up instead with the Ohio Mixers of the Continental Basketball Association (CBA), where he played one season, before moving to Spain.

His first two seasons in Spain, playing for the team Fórum Valladolid, were a good start to his career, as he attained the status of being the Liga ACB's best in rebounding, during two consecutive seasons.

In 1985, he signed with FC Barcelona, where he played seven seasons, between 1985 and 1992, and attained his greatest achievements: he won 4 Spanish League championships, 3 Spanish Cups, and one Prince of Asturias Cup. In 1992, he signed with Caja San Fernando of Sevilla, where he played his last two seasons of his profession. In 1994, he retired, and started a career as a basketball coach.

One characteristic that made him popular during his years in the Spanish league is that he shot free throws with his eyes closed.

== Basketball teams as a player ==
- High School: El Modena High Orange, California (United States): until 1978.
- Brigham Young University (NCAA) (United States): 1978–1982.
- Ohio Mixers (CBA) (United States): 1982–1983.
- Fórum Valladolid (Spain): 1983–1985.
- FC Barcelona (Spain): 1985–1992.
- Caja San Fernando de Sevilla (Spain): 1992–1994.

== Honors as a player ==
=== National club titles ===
- 4 Spanish League Championships: 1986–87, 1987–88, 1988–89, and 1989–90, with FC Barcelona.
- 3 Spanish Cups: 1986–87, 1987–88, and 1990–91, with FC Barcelona.
- 1 Prince of Asturias Cup: 1987–1988, with FC Barcelona.

=== Continental club titles ===
- 1 FIBA Korać Cup 1986–87 FIBA Korać Cup with FC Barcelona.
- 2 times FIBA European Champions Cup (runner-up) 1989–90 and 1990–91 with FC Barcelona.

=== Personal awards ===
- 2x Rebound Leader of the Spanish League, while playing with Forum Valladolid: 1983–84 (329 rebounds), and 1984–85 (403 rebounds).

== Coaching career ==
After he retired from playing professional basketball, Trumbo became a basketball coach.

== Teams as a coach ==
- Chapman University (NCAA): 1994–95. Assistant Coach to Mike Bobosky.
- Brigham Young University–Hawaii (NAIA): 1995–97. Assistant coach to Ken Wagner.
- Southern California University (NCAA): 1997–98. Assistant coach to Henry Bibby.
- FC Barcelona: 1998–00. Assistant Coach to Aíto García Reneses.
- FC Barcelona B (EBA League): 2000–01. Head Coach.

== Family ==
- Steve Trumbo was married in 1985 to Carolina Iglesias in Valladolid, Spain, and soon after became a father to twin boys, Giovanni and Isaac. After he began playing for FC Barcelona, they continued their family with Axel, Dakota and Kassandra Trumbo.
