= Lalo García (basketball) =

Spanish basketball player

Personal information
- Born: March 20, 1971 (age 55) Valladolid, Spain
- Listed height: 187 cm (6 ft 2 in)

Career information
- Playing career: 1988–2001
- Position: Shooting guard

Career history
- 1988–2001: Fórum Valladolid
Medals
Men's basketball
Representing Spain
European U-18 Championship
Bronze medal – third place	1990 Netherlands	U-18 Team

Gonzalo García Téllez, known as Lalo García (20 March 1971 – March 2015) was a Spanish basketball player. García played his entire career for CB Valladolid, his hometown club, and played for the Spanish national team.

On March 4, 2015, García left his home for a walk, without carrying any papers or phone. He was reported missing the following day. On March 31, García's body was found in the Pisuerga river.
