= Sergio Coterón =

Spanish basketball player

Sergio Alfredo Coterón Gonzalo (born 23 July 1961 in Madrid, Spain) is a retired basketball player.

== Clubs ==
- 1982-84 CB Breogán
- 1984-85 CB Guadalajara
- 1985-86 Real Canoe
- 1986-87 Caixa Ourense
- 1987-82 Valencia BC
- 1992-94 CB Gran Canaria
