= Jordi Puig =

Spanish basketball player (born 1971)

Jordi Puig Vicens (born 16 April 1971 in Girona, Catalonia, Spain) is a retired basketball player.

== Clubs ==
- 1988-93: CB Girona
