= Joe Arlauckas =

American basketball player (born 1965)

Personal information
- Born: July 20, 1965 (age 61) Rochester, New York, U.S.
- Listed height: 6 ft 9 in (2.06 m)
- Listed weight: 255 lb (116 kg)

Career information
- High school: Thomas Jefferson (Rochester, New York)
- College: Niagara (1983–1987)
- NBA draft: 1987: 4th round, 74th overall pick
- Drafted by: Sacramento Kings
- Playing career: 1987–2000
- Position: Power forward
- Number: 53

Career history
- 1987: Sacramento Kings
- 1988: Snaidero Caserta
- 1988–1990: Caja Ronda
- 1990–1993: Taugrés
- 1993–1998: Real Madrid
- 1998–1999: AEK
- 1999–2000: Aris

Career highlights
- FIBA European League champion (1995); FIBA European League Top Scorer (1996); FIBA EuroCup champion (1997); Spanish League champion (1994); Spanish Cup winner (1993); Spanish Cup MVP (1993); 4× Spanish League All-Star (1990, 1992, 1993, 1995); Italian Cup winner (1988); Greek League All-Star (1998); 101 Greats of European Basketball (2018); 3× Second-team All-NAC (1985–1987); Niagara Athletics Hall of Fame (1992); Metro Athletic Conference Hall of Fame (2019)
- Stats at NBA.com
- Stats at Basketball Reference

Joseph John Arlauckas (born July 20, 1965) is an American former professional basketball player of Lithuanian descent. During his playing career, he played at the power forward position. In 2018, he was named one of the 101 Greats of European Basketball.

Arlauckas is well-known for holding the record for the most points scored in a modern-era single EuroLeague game, including only games played since the 1991–92 season. He scored 63 points in a FIBA European League (EuroLeague) game, while playing with the Spanish club Real Madrid, in a game against the Italian club Virtus Bologna. The game took place during the 1995–96 season, and occurred on February 26, 1996. Radivoj Korać holds the overall all-time EuroLeague (FIBA European Champions Cup) single-game scoring record, at 99 points scored, counting all games played since the competition began during the 1958 season.

== Early years ==
Arlauckas was born on July 20, 1965, in Rochester, New York. He was born to an immigrant father from Lithuania, and to an Italian American mother. Arlauckas attended Thomas Jefferson High School, in Rochester, where he played high school basketball.

== College career ==
Arlauckas played four years of college basketball in the NCAA Division I, at Niagara University, with the Purple Eagles. He attended school and played there from 1983 to 1987. During his college career, he was a three-time All-North Atlantic Conference (NAC)Second Team selection (1985, 1986, 1987).

Arlauckas was inducted into the Niagara Athletics Hall of Fame in 1992. He was inducted into the Metro Atlantic Athletic Conference (MAAC)'s Hall of Fame in 2019.

== Professional career ==
=== NBA career ===
Arlauckas was drafted with the 74th pick of the 1987 NBA draft by the Sacramento Kings, along with their first round draft pick Kenny Smith. In his first season in the NBA, the Kings had a poor regular season record of 24–58 (sixth place of the Midwest Division), which started with Hall of Famer Bill Russell's brief stint as the Kings' head coach, during which time the Kings had a record of 17–41.

During his sole season in the NBA, Arlauckas appeared in nine games, averaging four points per game, in roughly 10 minutes of play per game.

=== Europe ===
On December 14, 1987, Arlauckas was cut by the NBA's Sacramento Kings. He then went to Italy, where he played for six months of time in the top-tier level Serie A with Snaidero Caserta. He went on to have a successful career playing in Spain, playing in the top-tier level Liga ACB.

In Spain, he played with Caja de Ronda, Taugrés, and Real Madrid, winning several individual and team accolades. He signed with Madrid in 1993 after they paid Taugrés 25 million pesetas for the transfer and the loan of young player Ignacio Castellanos. At Real Madrid, he formed one of European basketball's most fearsome front courts, along with center Arvydas Sabonis, and he won the championship of the top-tier level European league, the FIBA European League, with Real Madrid in 1995 against Olympiacos. With Madrid, he also won the second-tier level European league, the FIBA EuroCup, during the 1996–97 season.

On February 26, 1996, Arlauckas scored 63 points, a record in the modern era of the EuroLeague, against Kinder Bologna as Madrid won the game 115–96. In six seasons out of ten played in Spain, Arlauckas averaged more than 20 points per game. He scored 7,543 points in the Liga ACB, for a scoring average of 20.7 points per game.

He retired in 2000, at the age of 35, after playing two years in Greece – playing one season apiece with the Greek top-tier level Basket League clubs AEK Athens and Aris Thessaloniki.

== Post-playing career ==
After he retired from playing basketball, Arlauckas became a sports commentator, working for EuroLeague TV.

== Career statistics ==
Legend
GP	Games played	GS	Games started	MPG	Minutes per game
FG%	Field goal percentage	3P%	3-point field goal percentage	FT%	Free throw percentage
RPG	Rebounds per game	APG	Assists per game	SPG	Steals per game
BPG	Blocks per game	PPG	Points per game	**Bold**	Career high

=== NBA ===
==== Regular season ====
Year	Team	GP	GS	MPG	FG%	3P%	FT%	RPG	APG	SPG	BPG	PPG
1987–88	Sacramento	9	0	9.4	.326	—	.750	1.4	.9	.3	.4	3.8

== Honors and awards ==
- Italian Cup winner: 1988
- 4× Spanish League All-Star: 1990, 1992, 1993, 1995
- Spanish Cup winner: 1993
- Spanish Cup MVP: 1993
- Spanish League champion: 1993–94
- FIBA European League champion: 1994–95
- FIBA European League Top Scorer: 1995–96
- FIBA EuroCup champion: 1996–97
- Greek League All-Star: 1998
- 101 Greats of European Basketball: 2018
