= Raimundo Barneda =

Spanish basketball player

Raimundo Barneda Domingo (born 3 December 1968 in Vilanova i la Geltrú, Spain) is a retired basketball player.

== Clubs ==
- 1988-90: Bàsquet Manresa
- 1990-93: Ourense Baloncesto
- 1993-94: CB Peñas Huesca
