= Ismael Santos =

Spanish basketball player

Personal information
- Born: 26 February 1972 (age 54) Orense, Spain
- Listed height: 192 cm (6 ft 4 in)

Career information
- Playing career: 1989–2003
- Position: Point guard

Career history
- 1989–1991: Real Madrid
- 1991–1992: Guadalajara
- 1992–1999: Real Madrid
- 1999–2001: Benetton Treviso
- 2001–2002: Dafni
- 2002–2003: Aironi Novara

Career highlights
- EuroLeague All-Final Four Team (1995)

Ismael Santos (born 26 April 1972 in Orense, Spain) is a retired basketball player. As a member of Real Madrid, he won the Euroleague title in 1995, being selected to the EuroLeague All-Final Four Team in the process. In 1997, Santos was instrumental as Real Madrid won the Saporta Cup.

Santos played six times for the Spanish national team.

== Awards ==
- Liga ACB (2): 1992–93, 1993–94
- Copa del Rey (1): 1992–93
- Euroleague (1): 1994–95
- Saporta Cup (1): 1996–97
