= Pabellón Príncipe Felipe =

Indoor sporting arena located in Spain

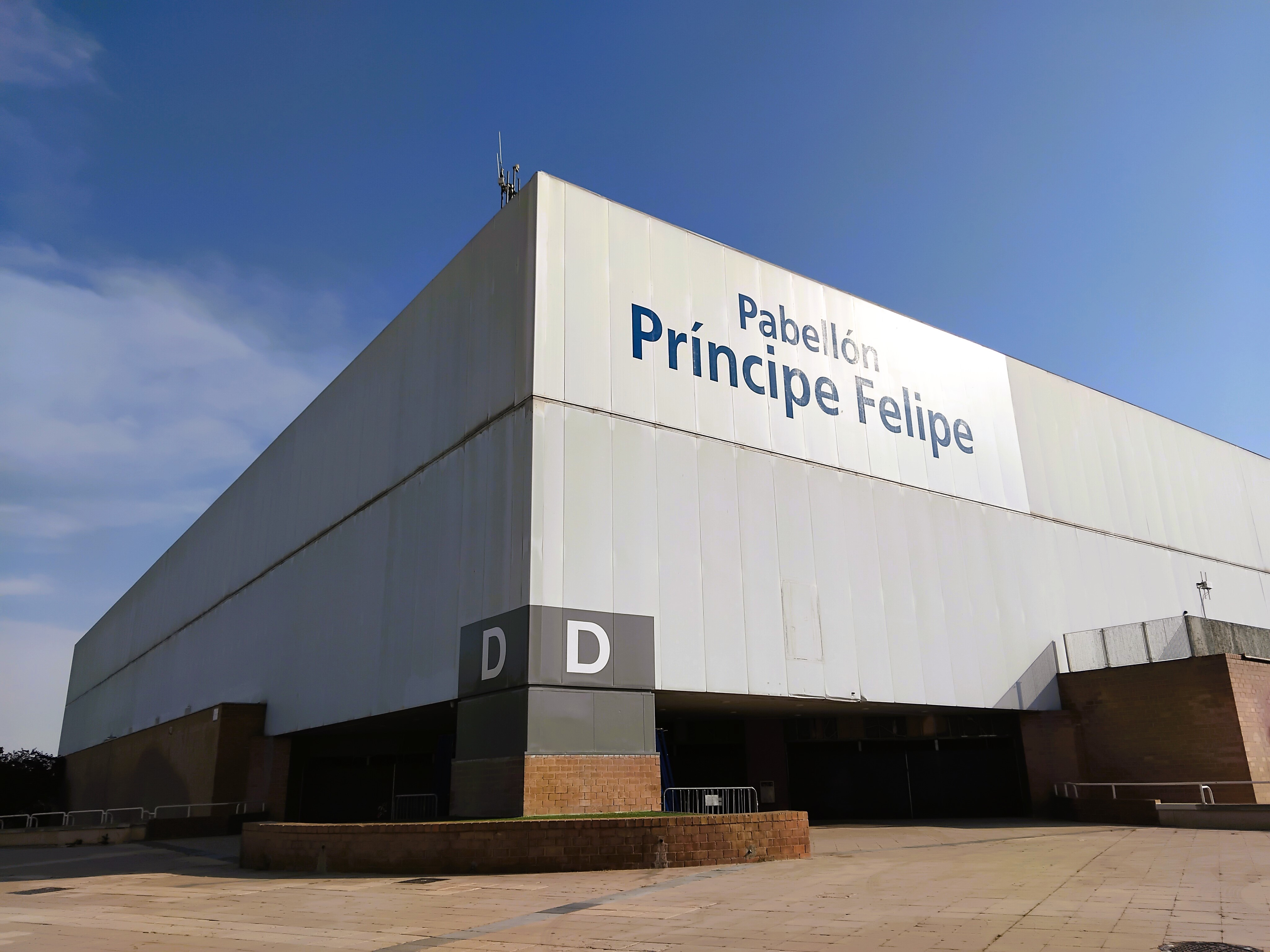
- Interactive map of Pabellón Príncipe Felipe
- Full name: Pabellón Príncipe Felipe
- Location: Zaragoza, Spain
- Coordinates: 41°38′7.22″N 0°51′58.58″W
- Owner: Ayuntamiento de Zaragoza
- Capacity: 10,744

Construction
- Opened: 17 April 1990
- Architects: Fernando Ruiz de Azúa (Studio A4) and José Jesús Fau

Tenants
- Basket Zaragoza (2002–present); BM Aragón; CDB Zaragoza (until 2007); CB Zaragoza (until 1996)

Pabellón Príncipe Felipe is an arena in Zaragoza, Spain. Opened on 17 April 1990, the arena holds 10,744 people. It is primarily used for basketball (home of Basket Zaragoza) and handball (home of Caja3 Aragón).

== Events hosted ==
The arena hosted the 1990 and 1995 Euroleague Final Fours, as well as the 1999 Saporta Cup Final in which Benetton Treviso defeated Pamesa Valencia.

The arena frequently hosts rock bands, such as David Bowie, Oasis, Iron Maiden and Depeche Mode.

The arena hosted 2010, 2018, 2023 and 2025 Copa de la Reina de Baloncesto.

The arena hosted the 2025 EuroLeague Women Final Six, and will also be the main venue in 2026 and 2027.

== Controversy about naming ==
On 24 July 2015, the Zaragoza City Hall changed the name of Pabellón Príncipe Felipe to Pabellón José Luis Abós, in honor of the beloved coach of CAI Zaragoza, who died in October 2014.

As a result of a controversy about changing the name of the pavilion, approved without majority in the voting in the City Hall, CAI Zaragoza did not support the change.

Finally, the process of changing the name was stopped judicially.

== See also ==
- Las Fuentes, Zaragoza
- List of indoor arenas in Spain

Preceded by Olympiahalle; Munich	FIBA European Champions Cup; Final Four; Venue; 1990	Succeeded by Palais omnisports de Paris-Bercy; Paris
Preceded by Yad Eliyahu Sports Hall; Tel Aviv	FIBA European Champions Cup; Final Four; Venue; 1995	Succeeded by Palais omnisports de Paris-Bercy; Paris
Preceded by Pionir Hall; Belgrade	Saporta Cup; Final Venue; 1999	Succeeded by CIG de Malley; Lausanne
