= Ramón Rivas =

Puerto Rican basketball player (born 1966)

Personal information
- Born: March 16, 1966 (age 60) Carolina, Puerto Rico
- Listed height: 6 ft 10 in (2.08 m)
- Listed weight: 260 lb (118 kg)

Career information
- High school: Pedro Albizu Campos (Carolina, Puerto Rico)
- College: Temple (1985–1988)
- NBA draft: 1988: undrafted
- Playing career: 1988–1999
- Position: Power forward / center
- Number: 45

Career history
- 1988–1989: Boston Celtics
- 1989–1996: Taugrés
- 1996–1997: FC Barcelona
- 1997–1998: AEK
- 1998: Cáceres
- 1998–1999: Zara Imballaggi Fabriano

Career highlights
- Spanish League champion (1997); Spanish Cup winner (1995); FIBA Saporta Cup champion (1996); FIBA Saporta Cup Finals MVP (1996); BSN Most Valuable Player (1989); BSN Rookie of the Year (1984)
- Stats at NBA.com
- Stats at Basketball Reference

Juan Ramón Rivas Contreras (born March 16, 1966) is a Puerto Rican former professional basketball player, and sports color commentator. Rivas was the third player from Puerto Rico to play in the NBA (after Butch Lee and José Ortiz), and half of the first duo of Puerto Ricans to be active in the NBA simultaneously (with Ortiz). Rivas has played in the NBA, NCAA Division I, and in the Puerto Rican National Superior League (BSN), with the Carolina Giants.

Rivas also played internationally, in Spain, Greece, and Italy. Rivas was also a member of the senior Puerto Rican National Basketball Team for several years. He represented Puerto Rico at the following tournaments: the 1986 FIBA World Championship, in Málaga, Spain; the 1988 Summer Olympic Games, in Seoul, South Korea; the 1990 FIBA World Championship, in Buenos Aires, Argentina; the 1992 Summer Olympic Games, in Barcelona, Spain; and the 1996 Summer Olympics, in Atlanta, United States.

== Biography ==
=== Early years ===
As a youngster, Rivas played at The San Juan YMCA, for Millin Romero. He progressed through Carolina's minor basketball tournaments, becoming one of the best centers in Puerto Rico, while he played for Levittown's Pedro Albizu Campos High School's team. Flor Melendez took note of his progress, and signed him to play for the Carolina Giants, of Puerto Rico's top-tier level league, the BSN. That year he was selected BSN Rookie of the Year.

The changes on the Carolina Giants were evident, when Rivas joined the team: From being one of the worst teams in the league, during the 1983 tournament, they got better every year. In 1987, the team almost reached the BSN playoffs, and, in 1988, the team finally reached the BSN playoffs, for the first time, having the best record in the regular season (1989 Regular Season: PPG.24.4, Reb.17.4 in 30 games).

== College career ==
Rivas attended Temple University, where he played NCAA Division I college basketball with the Temple Owls, from 1984 to 1988, going on four occasions to the NCAA post season tournament. He was coached by Hall of Fame head coach John Chaney. Temple was ranked 1st in the nation in his senior year, with a record of 34 wins and 2 losses. Playing with the Owls helped him gain experience, and improve his game in the NCAA. He became well known in the United States, as a center who could score points, and rebound in double figures, and was a respected player among his peers.

== Professional career ==
=== Signed by the NBA ===
Thanks to his notable NCAA Division I college basketball career, the Boston Celtics announced that they would sign Rivas for a full season, towards the end of the 1988 Summer Olympic Games, in Seoul. Having coincided with José Ortiz's signing by the Utah Jazz two weeks prior, Rivas' signing by the Celtics was a cause of great celebration for Puerto Ricans, many of whom felt their efforts in basketball were finally being recognized by the NBA.

With the Celtics, Rivas had the opportunity to share playing time alongside Larry Bird, Kevin McHale, Dennis Johnson, Robert Parish, Reggie Lewis, and Brian Shaw, among others. The Celtics reached the playoffs, by beating the Washington Bullets by two games, for the eighth and final playoff spot in the NBA east that year, but were swept in three games, by the eventual champion Detroit Pistons, in the playoffs' first round.

Because of his height, Rivas had to change playing positions when he arrived to the Celtics, going from playing center in Puerto Rico, to power forward in Boston.

After that season with the Celtics, he came back to Puerto Rico, and received his first Puerto Rican League MVP honor, while playing for the Carolina Giants. That summer, he was signed by a basketball club in Spain, called Taugrés, which became his home for the next 7 years.

=== Europe ===
Rivas played for Taugrés in the Spanish League from 1989 until 1996, winning the Spanish King's Cup in 1995. He arrived with the Vitorian team to the FIBA European Cup (later called FIBA Saporta Cup) Finals in three consecutive years (1994, 1995, 1996) finally winning it in the 1995–96 season, against Peja Stojaković's team PAOK, and becoming the Finals MVP, with 32 points and 15 rebounds. In the 1996–97 season, he won the Spanish league with FC Barcelona and also finished runner-up of the 1996–97 FIBA EuroLeague, losing to Olympiacos from Greek Basket League. The following season went to Athens to play for AEK of Giannis Ioannidis, one of the biggest clubs in Greece, and played in another EuroLeague Final (1997–98 FIBA EuroLeague) against Ettore Messina's Kinder Bologna. In 1998, he went back to Spain, for his final year with the club Cáceres. In 1999, he played in Italy for the club Fabriano.

== National team career ==
Rivas represented Puerto Rico, as a member of the senior Puerto Rican national basketball team, at the 1988 Summer Olympic Games, in Seoul, South Korea, the 1992 Summer Olympic Games, held at Barcelona, Spain, and the 1996 Summer Olympic Games, held in Atlanta. He also won the gold medal at the 1991 Pan American Games, and he also played at the 1986 FIBA World Championship, and the 1990 FIBA World Championship.

== Sports commentator ==
Rivas worked for the Orlando Magic for 9 years, as a sports broadcasting color analyst, and for 5 years, for Fox Sports in Spanish. He worked as a TV sports color analyst at the Summer Olympic Games of Beijing 2008, and the Summer Olympic Games of London 2012, next to Edgar Lopez, for NBC Telemundo.

== Career statistics ==
Legend
GP	Games played	GS	Games started	MPG	Minutes per game
FG%	Field goal percentage	3P%	3-point field goal percentage	FT%	Free throw percentage
RPG	Rebounds per game	APG	Assists per game	SPG	Steals per game
BPG	Blocks per game	PPG	Points per game	**Bold**	Career high

=== NBA ===
==== Regular season ====
Year	Team	GP	GS	MPG	FG%	3P%	FT%	RPG	APG	SPG	BPG	PPG
1988–89	Boston	28	0	3.3	.387	.000	.640	.9	.1	.1	.0	1.4
