= Ronald Draper (basketball) =

American basketball player

Ronald Draper (born July 8, 1967 in Los Angeles, California) is a retired American basketball player. A graduate of Pomona High School in California, Draper played for Mount San Antonio College and South Florida Community College before playing at American University from 1988–1990.

== College ==
Draper played for American University after previously attending two Junior Colleges, Mount San Antonio College and South Florida Community College . The 6'9" Draper averaged 16.4 points and 12.0 rebounds in 1988–1989 to help American finish 17–11. In 1989–90 Draper averaged 16.1 points and 12.2 rebounds as American went 20–9.

== Professional Teams ==
- 1990–91: Quad City Thunder (CBA)
- 1990–91: Grand Rapids Hoops (CBA)
- 1991: CB Málaga (Spain)
- 1991–92: Galatasaray (Turkish Basketball League)
- 1992–95: Daiwa Securitis (Japan)
- 1995–96: Basketball Club Oostende (Belgium)
- 1995–96: Racing Club de Avellaneda (Argentina)
- 1995–96: Gaiteros del Zulia (Venezuela)
- 1997–98: Atléticos de San Germán (Puerto Rico)
- 1998–99: Olympique Antibes (France)
- 1999–00: Panathinaikos Limassol (Cyprus)
- 2000–01: Legia Warszawa (Poland)

== Awards ==
- Venezuelan league (1): 1995–96

== Highlights ==
- CBA All-Star Game: 1990, 1991
