= Ignacio Suárez (basketball) =

Spanish basketball player

Ignacio Suárez Sureda (born 20 November 1964 in León, Spain) is a retired basketball player.

== Clubs ==
- 1983–84: Ebro Manresa
- 1984–85: CB L'Hospitalet
- 1985–86: Procesator Mataró
- 1986–88: CD Oximesa
- 1988–91: Club Ourense Baloncesto
- 1991–93: CB Murcia
- 1993–94: CB Peñas Huesca
