= Daniel Álvarez (basketball) =

Spanish basketball player

Daniel Álvarez Palomero (born 2 April 1971 in Zaragoza, Spain) is a retired basketball player.

== Clubs ==
- 1989-94: CAI Zaragoza
- 1994: Pamesa Valencia
- 1995-98: CB Breogán
- 1998: Menorca Bàsquet
- 1999-00: Caceres Club Baloncesto
