= Arvydas Sabonis =

Lithuanian basketball player and executive (born 1964)

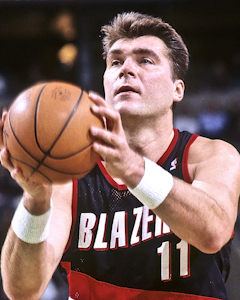
- Sabonis with the Portland Trail Blazers in 1996

Personal information
- Born: 19 December 1964 (age 61) Kaunas, Lithuanian SSR, Soviet Union
- Listed height: 7 ft 3 in (2.21 m)
- Listed weight: 292 lb (132 kg)

Career information
- NBA draft: 1986: 1st round, 24th overall pick
- Drafted by: Portland Trail Blazers
- Playing career: 1981–2004
- Position: Center
- Number: 11

Career history
- 1981–1989: Žalgiris
- 1989–1992: Fórum Valladolid
- 1992–1995: Real Madrid
- 1995–2001: Portland Trail Blazers
- 2001–2002: Žalgiris
- 2002–2003: Portland Trail Blazers
- 2003–2004: Žalgiris

Career highlights
- FIBA Club World Cup champion (1986); FIBA European League champion (1995); 3× USSR League champion (1985–1987); 2× ACB League champion (1993, 1994); LKL champion (2004); Spanish Cup winner (1993); FIBA's 50 Greatest Players (1991); 50 Greatest EuroLeague Contributors (2008); 6× Euroscar Player of the Year (1984, 1985, 1988, 1995, 1997, 1999); 2× Mr. Europa Player of the Year (1985, 1997); 4× Lithuanian Sportsman of the Year (1984–1986, 1996); EuroBasket MVP (1985); 2× EuroLeague Player Of the Year (1993, 1995); FIBA European League Final Four MVP (1995); EuroLeague Group Stage MVP (2004); EuroLeague Top 16 Stage MVP (2004); All-EuroLeague First Team (2004); 2× Spanish League Finals MVP (1993, 1994); 2× Spanish League MVP (1994, 1995); 2× Spanish All-Star Game MVP (1991, 1992); LKL All-Star (2004); 2× EuroLeague Finals Top Scorer (1986, 1995); NBA All-Rookie First Team (1996); No. 11 retired by Žalgiris Kaunas; FIBA European League Rebounding Leader (1993); EuroLeague Rebounding Leader (2004); EuroLeague Blocks Leader (2004); EuroLeague PIR Leader (2004)

Career NBA statistics
- Points: 5,629 (12.0 ppg)
- Rebounds: 3,436 (7.3 rpg)
- Assists: 964 (2.1 apg)
- Stats at NBA.com
- Stats at Basketball Reference
- Basketball Hall of Fame
- FIBA Hall of Fame
Medals
Men's basketball
Olympic Games
Representing Soviet Union
Gold medal – first place	1988 Seoul	Team
Representing Lithuania
Bronze medal – third place	1992 Barcelona	Team
Bronze medal – third place	1996 Atlanta	Team
World Cup
Representing Soviet Union
Gold medal – first place	Colombia 1982
Silver medal – second place	Spain 1986
EuroBasket
Representing Soviet Union
Bronze medal – third place	1983 France
Gold medal – first place	1985 West Germany
Bronze medal – third place	1989 Yugoslavia
Representing Lithuania
Silver medal – second place	1995 Greece
European Championship for Cadets
Representing Soviet Union
Gold medal – first place	1981 Greece	Under-18

Arvydas Romas Sabonis (Lithuanian pronunciation: [ˈaːrviːdaːs ˈsaːboːnʲɪs]; born 19 December 1964) is a Lithuanian former professional basketball player. Sabonis won the Euroscar six times and the Mr. Europa Award twice. He played in a variety of leagues, including the Spanish ACB League, and spent seven seasons in the National Basketball Association (NBA). Playing the center position, Sabonis won a gold medal at the 1988 Summer Olympics, in South Korea, for the Soviet Union, and later earned bronze medals at the 1992 Olympic Games and 1996 Olympic Games representing Lithuania. He retired from professional basketball in 2005. Sabonis was selected by the Portland Trail Blazers in the first round of the 1986 NBA draft, but he did not play his first NBA game until 1995, at the age of 30.

On 20 August 2010, Sabonis was inducted into the FIBA Hall of Fame in recognition of his great play in international competition. On 4 April 2011, Sabonis was named to the Naismith Memorial Basketball Hall of Fame, and he was inducted on 12 August 2011. On 24 October 2011, Sabonis was voted as the next President of the Lithuanian Basketball Federation, replacing Vladas Garastas, who had led the LBF since 1991. He resigned from the position on 2 October 2013, but he came back to it on 10 October 2013.

His son, Domantas Sabonis, plays for the NBA's Sacramento Kings as of 2026.

== Early life and career ==
Sabonis was born in Kaunas, and began playing basketball at age 13. By the time he was 15 years old, he was a member of the Soviet national junior team.

Sabonis was excused from mandatory service to the Soviet Army, by enrolling at the Lithuanian University of Agriculture, in his hometown.

== Professional career ==
=== Žalgiris ===
Sabonis made his professional club debut in 1981, with one of the oldest basketball teams in Lithuania, Žalgiris, in his hometown of Kaunas. With the club, he won three consecutive Soviet Premier League titles, and the 1986 FIBA Club World Cup (FIBA Intercontinental Cup).

=== Valladolid ===
In 1989, Sabonis left Žalgiris, and signed with the Spanish Liga ACB club Fórum Valladolid. During the 1991–92 season, Sabonis helped the team to reach the semifinals at the Korać Cup.

=== Real Madrid ===
In 1992, after playing with Fórum Valladolid for three seasons, Sabonis joined the Spanish club Real Madrid, and with them, he won two Spanish League titles, and a FIBA European League (EuroLeague) title, in 1994–95. With Real Madrid, during the 1994–95 Spanish League season, he averaged 22.9 points, 12.5 rebounds, 2.4 assists, 1.6 steals, and 2.3 blocked shots, in 42 games played. While in the 1994–95 FIBA European League season, he averaged 21.8 points, 11.2 rebounds, 2.6 assists, and 1.8 steals per game, in 17 games played. While a member of Real, Sabonis was twice voted the FIBA European League Player of the Year, in 1993 and 1995, and he was also voted the FIBA European League Final Four MVP, in 1995.

=== Portland Trail Blazers ===
Sabonis was originally selected by the Atlanta Hawks with the 77th overall pick of the 1985 NBA draft. However, the selection was voided because Sabonis was under 21 at the time of the draft. The following spring, he suffered a devastating Achilles' tendon injury. Nevertheless, he was selected by the Portland Trail Blazers, with the 24th overall pick of the 1986 NBA draft. As of 2025, Sabonis would be the last player to be selected in multiple NBA drafts, since the process of players entering multiple draft years would be abolished after the 1980s. Sabonis was not allowed to play in the US by the Soviet authorities, despite an offer from LSU Tigers head coach Dale Brown to have Sabonis play at Louisiana State University, thus preserving his amateur status for Olympic competition. However, Sabonis did go to Portland, to rehabilitate his injury with the Blazers medical staff, in 1988, while also practicing with the team.

After the 1994–95 European season, Sabonis and Portland contacted one another about a move to the NBA. Before signing Sabonis, Portland's then-general manager, Bob Whitsitt, asked the Blazers team physician to look at Sabonis' X-rays. Illustrating the impact of Sabonis' numerous injuries, Whitsitt recalled in a 2011 interview, that when the doctor reported the results, "He said that Arvydas could qualify for a handicapped parking spot, based on the X-ray alone." Nevertheless, the Blazers signed Sabonis. He had a successful rookie campaign, averaging 14.5 points, on 55% shooting, and 8.1 rebounds per game while playing less than 24 minutes per game. Sabonis was selected to the All-Rookie First Team and was runner-up in both Rookie of the Year and Sixth Man of the Year voting. His postseason averages went up to 23.6 points and 10.2 rebounds per game. In the first playoff series of his NBA career, Portland lost to Utah in five games. Sabonis averaged 16.0 points, 10.0 rebounds, and 3.0 assists per game in 1997–98, all career-highs.

During Sabonis's first stint in Portland, the Blazers made the playoffs every year (as part of the team's 21-year postseason streak). After six consecutive first round losses, Portland changed large parts of its roster between 1998 and 1999 in a bid to compete for the NBA Championship: Sabonis the only starter retained. Kenny Anderson and Isaiah Rider were traded for Damon Stoudamire and Steve Smith. In both those years, the Blazers reached the Western Conference Finals. In 1999, they were swept by the eventual champion San Antonio Spurs, and the next year a starting five of Sabonis, Smith, Stoudamire, Rasheed Wallace, and recently added Scottie Pippen lost to the Los Angeles Lakers (at the beginning of the team's three-peat) in seven games.

The forever unanswered question about Sabonis' NBA career is how good he could have been had he played there during his prime. He was already 30 when he joined the Blazers, by which time he had already won multiple gold medals, suffered through numerous injuries, and had lost much of his mobility and athleticism. In Bill Simmons's "Book of Basketball", Sabonis the international player is idealized, while Sabonis the Blazer is described as "lumbering up and down the court in what looked to be concrete Nikes" and ranking "just behind Artis Gilmore on the Moving Like a Mummy Scale." According to ESPN's David Thorpe, Sabonis would have been the best passing big man in NBA history, and possibly a top-four center overall, had he played his entire career there. Teammate and basketball Hall of Famer Clyde Drexler felt the Trail Blazers would "have had four, five or six titles" had Sabonis been able to spend his prime in Portland next to the plethora All-Stars that included him, Terry Porter, Buck Williams, Steve Johnson, Kevin Duckworth, and Clifford Robinson.. "Guaranteed. He was that good. He could pass, shoot three pointers, had a great post game, and dominated the paint." Despite Sabonis' height and weight, he was, according to NBA.com's Erik Lyslo, "a magician in the post who played the game with a style I've never seen from a big man. He was a point guard in a center's body. And, just to be fair to Arvydas, he was better than most point guards are at distributing the ball." His age and injuries made him appear as a "big guy who looked like he couldn't make it up the court, but the same guy who made the defense look foolish with a pass that whizzed by their ear. It just goes to show you how smarts and court savvy will always age better than a guy with no brains and all athletic ability".

On 6 April 2001, Sabonis scored a season-high 32 points while making 11 of 12 field goal attempts during a 122–91 win over the Golden State Warriors. After the 2000–2001 NBA season, Sabonis refused to sign an extension with the Trail Blazers and retired from the NBA. In his own words, he "was tired mentally and physically." Instead, he returned to Europe, where he signed a one-year deal, at a nominal salary, with Žalgiris Kaunas, expecting to join the team for the most important games of the season down the stretch. However, he ended up missing that season in its entirety, resting and recovering from injuries. Sabonis rejoined the Trail Blazers for one final season, in 2002–2003.

He won the Euroscar twice while playing with the Blazers. He also became a fan favorite, and had a warm welcome back when he visited Portland in 2011, en route to being enshrined into the Naismith Hall of Fame.

=== Back to Žalgiris ===
Sabonis went back to Žalgiris to play his final season, in 2003–04. He led the team to the Top 16 stage of the EuroLeague that year, and was named both the Group Stage MVP and the Top 16 Stage MVP. He also became the team's president. Sabonis would officially retire from playing professional basketball, in 2005.

== National team career ==
=== Soviet national team ===
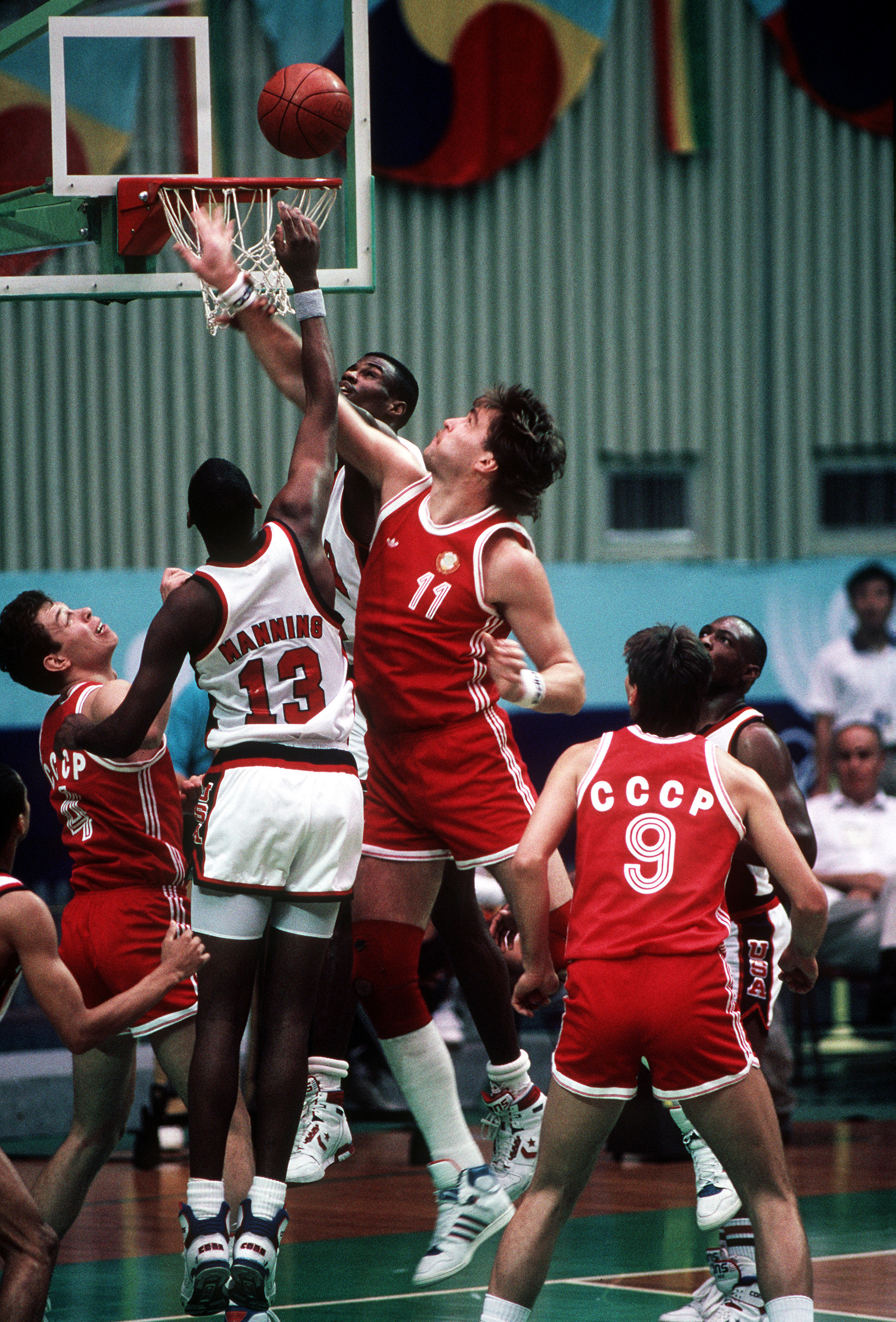
Sabonis, a member of the Soviet Union national team, taking on David Robinson and Danny Manning, during the semifinal clash with Team USA, at the 1988 Olympics. The Soviets scored an 82–76 win, with Sabonis contributing 13 points and 13 rebounds.

In 1982, Sabonis was one of the players in the senior Soviet Union national team that toured the United States, playing against various college basketball teams.

Despite being recommended to rest, instead of playing in the 1988 Summer Olympics, the Soviets allowed Sabonis to remain a part of their national team. Sabonis led the Soviet Union to a gold medal, with a win against the 1988 edition of the United States national team, that featured future NBA All-Stars David Robinson, Mitch Richmond, and Danny Manning in the semifinals. This was the last American Olympic team that was not composed of active NBA players. The team later beat Yugoslavia in the finals.

In his career with the senior Soviet national team, Sabonis also played at the following major tournaments: the 1982 FIBA World Championship (gold medal), the 1983 EuroBasket (bronze medal), the 1985 EuroBasket (gold medal), the 1986 FIBA World Championship (silver medal), and the 1989 EuroBasket (bronze medal). He was named to the EuroBasket All-Tournament Team in 1983 and 1985, and he was named the EuroBasket MVP in 1985.

The 1985–1988 stretch of a heavy playing schedule, and lack of rest, took a significant toll on Sabonis's future health and durability. Various leg injuries were not given much time to heal, due to the Cold War climate that surrounded international competition, as well as the intense rivalry of the Žalgiris Kaunas versus CSKA Moscow games in the USSR Premier League. In a 2011 interview, Sabonis expressed an opinion, that overuse by the coaches of the Soviet national program, was a major contributing factor to his first Achilles' tendon injury, back in 1986. Another key moment for his future health, took place in 1988, when Sabonis had a surgical Achilles procedure performed in Portland, but was rushed back on the floor with the USSR Olympic team, before a full recovery. The decision to include a limping Sabonis, on the USSR roster for the 1988 Olympic Games, was protested at the time by the Portland medical staff, and was later heavily criticized. While the Soviets cleared him to play professionally in 1989, when his Soviet national teammate, Šarūnas Marčiulionis, went to North America, Sabonis postponed his travel, over feeling that he was not physically ready for the NBA. Eventually, Sabonis would develop chronic knee, ankle and groin issues, that substantially limited his mobility and explosiveness, by the mid-1990s.

=== Lithuanian national team ===
After breakup of the Soviet Union, and the independence of Lithuania, Sabonis then became a member of the senior Lithuanian national team. He represented Lithuania at the following major tournaments: the 1992 Summer Olympic Games (bronze medal), the 1995 EuroBasket (silver medal), the 1996 Summer Olympic Games (bronze medal), and the 1999 EuroBasket. He was named to the EuroBasket All-Tournament Team in 1995.

Sabonis was also awarded a silver medal at the 2013 EuroBasket tournament, due to being the Lithuanian Basketball Federation (LKF) President.

== Career statistics ==
Legend
GP	Games played	GS	Games started	MPG	Minutes per game
FG%	Field goal percentage	3P%	3-point field goal percentage	FT%	Free throw percentage
RPG	Rebounds per game	APG	Assists per game	SPG	Steals per game
BPG	Blocks per game	PPG	Points per game	**Bold**	Career high
*	Led the league

=== NBA ===
==== Regular season ====
Year	Team	GP	GS	MPG	FG%	3P%	FT%	RPG	APG	SPG	BPG	PPG
1995–96	Portland	73	21	23.8	**.545**	.375	.757	8.1	1.8	**.9**	1.1	14.5
1996–97	Portland	69	68	25.5	.498	.371	.777	7.9	2.1	**.9**	1.2	13.4
1997–98	Portland	73	**73**	**32.0**	.493	.261	.798	**10.0**	**3.0**	**.9**	1.1	**16.0**
1998–99	Portland	50*	48	27.0	.485	.292	.771	7.9	2.4	.7	**1.3**	12.1
1999–00	Portland	66	61	25.6	.505	.368	**.843**	7.8	1.8	.7	1.2	11.8
2000–01	Portland	61	42	21.3	.479	.067	.776	5.4	1.5	.7	1.0	10.1
2002–03	Portland	**78**	1	15.5	.476	**.500**	.787	4.3	1.8	.8	.6	6.1
Career		470	314	24.2	.500	.328	.786	7.3	2.1	.8	1.1	12.0

==== Playoffs ====
Year	Team	GP	GS	MPG	FG%	3P%	FT%	RPG	APG	SPG	BPG	PPG
1996	Portland	5	5	**35.4**	.432	**.556**	.717	**10.2**	1.8	.8	.6	**23.6**
1997	Portland	4	4	27.0	.429	.250	.875	6.5	2.3	.8	.8	11.3
1998	Portland	4	4	26.8	.450	.500	.857	7.8	1.5	**1.8**	.8	12.3
1999	Portland	13	13	30.2	.398	.200	**.907**	8.8	2.2	1.2	1.2	10.0
2000	Portland	**16**	**16**	30.8	.453	.286	.796	6.7	1.9	.9	.8	11.3
2001	Portland	3	3	34.7	.483	.000	.750	8.3	**2.7**	.3	**2.3**	11.3
2003	Portland	6	1	14.3	**.667**	—	.800	4.0	.8	.7	.7	10.0
Career		51	46	28.8	.452	.319	.802	7.4	1.9	.9	.9	12.1

=== EuroLeague ===
Legend
GP	Games played	GS	Games started	MPG	Minutes per game
FG%	Field-goal percentage	3P%	3-point field-goal percentage	FT%	Free-throw percentage
RPG	Rebounds per game	APG	Assists per game	SPG	Steals per game
BPG	Blocks per game	PPG	Points per game	PIR	Performance index rating
**Bold**	Career high	†	Won a EuroLeague championship	*	Led the league

Year	Team	GP	GS	MPG	FG%	3P%	FT%	RPG	APG	SPG	BPG	PPG	PIR
1985–86	Žalgiris	13	—	—	—	—	—	—	—	—	—	**24.5**	—
1986–87	Žalgiris	6	—	—	—	—	—	—	—	—	—	21.3	—
1992–93	Real Madrid	**20**	—	30.9	.543	.500	.663	**12.0***	1.9	1.2	—	16.5	—
1993–94	Real Madrid	15	—	**34.3**	**.577**	.350	.723	11.9	**2.9**	1.0	—	17.4	—
1994–95†	Real Madrid	17	—	33.8	.572	**.545**	**.783**	11.2	2.6	**1.8**	—	21.8	—
2003–04	Žalgiris	18	14	28.3	.560	.366	.696	10.7*	2.4	1.0	**1.6***	16.7	**26.3***
Career		89	—	31.6	.562	.439	.716	11.4	2.4	1.3	1.6	19.2	—

== Personal life ==
Sabonis is married to Ingrida Mikelionytė, the first Miss Lithuania, a fashion model, and a movie actress. They have a daughter named Aušrinė, and three sons: Žygimantas, Tautvydas, and Domantas – the last two being born in the cities their father was playing, Valladolid and Portland. Once Sabonis left the NBA, the family moved to the Spanish coastal city of Málaga. Domantas was drafted 11th overall in the 2016 NBA draft and is a three-time NBA All-Star currently playing for the Sacramento Kings. Žygimantas and Tautvydas decided to continue their careers in Europe. Both Domantas and Tautvydas played for the Lithuania national team in different levels of competition.

In September 2011, Sabonis suffered a heart attack, while playing basketball in Lithuania. Doctors said that the heart attack was not life-threatening.

According to his son, Domantas, Arvydas is a huge fan of the Boston Celtics, his favorite basketball player is Larry Bird and his favorite color is green.

In March 2022, following the start of the Russian invasion of Ukraine, Sabonis severely criticized Russia and demonstrated his support to Ukraine, Ukrainians, Alexander Volkov: "I do not communicate with Russians. I had text chat with A. Volkov, other Ukrainians. They are all out of balance. And the Russians... We will never be able to believe these liars again in our lives. Peace doves, bleha. Peaceful country! Is this peace here? To blow up children and free people? There are no words. I have no desire to communicate with them."

== Lithuanian and foreign orders ==
- Lithuania: Recipient of the Commander's Cross of the Order of the Lithuanian Grand Duke Gediminas (1995)
- Lithuania: Recipient of the Commander's Grand Cross of the Order of the Lithuanian Grand Duke Gediminas (1996)
- IOC: Recipient of the Olympic Order (2001)

== Popular culture ==
Sabonis appeared on the Lithuanian cover of the video game NBA Live 2001.

His basketball career and journey to represent his native Lithuania in the 1992 Barcelona Olympics is highlighted in the documentary film The Other Dream Team. The film premiered at the Sundance Film Festival in 2012 and was distributed by Lionsgate in the U.S. and Disney internationally.

In 2014, Sabonis appeared in a documentary entitled Arvydas Sabonis. 11, which covered his career since 1981.

In 2023, Sabonis appeared in a movie Bilietas (The Ticket), which covered basketball club Žalgiris Kaunas in 1979–1989.

== See also ==
- List of tallest players in NBA history
- List of European basketball players in the United States
