= José Miguel Antúnez =

Spanish basketball player

Personal information
- Born: 21 February 1967 (age 59) Madrid, Spain
- Listed height: 6 ft 0 in (1.83 m)
- Listed weight: 175 lb (79 kg)

Career information
- Playing career: 1986–2003
- Position: Point guard
- Number: 9

Career history
- 1986–1991: Estudiantes
- 1991–1998: Real Madrid
- 1998–1999: Granada
- 1999–2001: Breogán
- 2001–2002: Le Havre
- 2002: Benfica
- 2002–2003: Fuenlabrada

Career highlights
- EuroLeague champion (1995); FIBA European Selection (1995); FIBA Saporta Cup champion (1992); 2× Spanish League champion (1993, 1994); Spanish Cup winner (1993)
Medals
Representing Spain
Men's Basketball
EuroBasket
Bronze medal – third place	1991 Rome

José Miguel Antúnez Melero (born 21 February 1967 in Madrid, Spain) is a retired Spanish professional basketball player.

== Professional career ==
Antúnez was a member of the FIBA European Selection team, in 1995.

== Spain national team ==
Antúnez played in 45 games, with the senior Spain national basketball team. They won a bronze medal at the 1991 EuroBasket.

== Awards and accomplishments ==
- Spanish League Champion (2): 1992–93, 1993–94
- Spanish Cup Winner (1): 1992–93
- EuroLeague Champion (1): 1994–95
- FIBA Saporta Cup Champion (1): 1991–92
