= FIBA EuroBasket 2001 qualification =

Qualification for the 2001 FIBA European Championship, commonly called FIBA EuroBasket 2001, took place between 18 May 1998 and 27 January 2001. A total of eight teams qualified for the tournament. The top eight teams from EuroBasket 1999 earned direct qualification.

== Format ==
A total of 32 teams participated. Competition consisted of three stages:

- A preliminary round that consisted of seven teams that competed in a round-robin tournament that took place in Helsinki, Finland between 18 May and 24 May 1998. The top two teams advanced to the semi-final round.
- A qualifying round where the third through seventh teams from the preliminary round joined another eleven teams. The sixteen teams where divided into three round-robin groups, two of six teams each, and one of four teams. Each group competition took place in a different city. This stage was hosted by Norway, Slovakia and Switzerland and took place between 19 May and 23 May 1999. The top three teams from the groups with six teams and the top two teams from the group with four teams advanced to the semi-final round.
- A semi-final round where the teams that advanced through the preliminary and qualifying rounds joined another fourteen teams. All twenty-four teams where then divided in four round-robin groups of six teams each. This stage took place between 24 November 1999 and 27 January 2001 and competition consisted of home and away legs, taking place in each of the participating countries. The top two teams from each group qualified for EuroBasket 2001.

== Preliminary round ==
Qualified for the semi-final round
Qualified for the qualifying round

Team	Pld	W	L	PF	PA	PD	Pts	Tie
Finland	6	6	0	500	337	+163	12	
Austria	6	4	2	459	435	+24	10	1–0
Cyprus	6	4	2	299	340	−41	10	0–1
Norway	6	3	3	410	420	−10	9	
Ireland	6	2	4	436	443	−7	8	1–0
Switzerland	6	2	4	433	414	+19	8	0–1
Luxembourg	6	0	6	355	503	−148	6	

18 May 1998

Boxscore

Luxembourg	82–98	Austria
Scoring by half: 32–47, 50–51
Pts: Feyder 22; Rebs: Boever, Wohl 6 Asts: Adam 5		Pts: Volcic, Stazic 22; Rebs: Volcic 11; Asts: Stazic 5

Helsinki

18 May 1998

Boxscore

Ireland	88–80	Switzerland
Scoring by half: 39–41, 49–39
Pts: Callahan 23; Rebs: Callahan 9 Asts: Maguire 3		Pts: Mrazek 29; Rebs: Koller 6 Asts: Valis 4

Helsinki

18 May 1998

Boxscore

Norway	55–82	Finland
Scoring by half: 23–46, 32–36
Pts: Bryn 15; Rebs: Bryn 7 Asts: Eckhoff 3		Pts: Luhtanen 18; Rebs: Möttölä 10; Asts: Lehtonen 5

Helsinki

19 May 1998

Boxscore

Cyprus	57–56	Ireland
Scoring by half: 31–22, 26–34
Pts: Stylianides 14; Rebs: Antoniou 6 Asts: Kyriacou, Stylianides 3		Pts: Powell 22; Rebs: Callahan, Richardson 7 Asts: Richardson 3

Helsinki

19 May 1998

Boxscore

Switzerland	80–56	Norway
Scoring by half: 38–17, 42–39
Pts: Mrazek 19; Rebs: Ceresa, Clément 6 Asts: Koller 4		Pts: Bryn 17; Rebs: Bryn 8 Asts: Eckhoff 2

Helsinki

19 May 1998

Boxscore

Finland	86–57	Luxembourg
Scoring by half: 41–35, 41–25
Pts: Luhtanen 17; Rebs: Markkanen 8 Asts: Lehtonen 6		Pts: Adam 15; Rebs: Boever, Wohl 4 Asts: Adam 2

Helsinki

20 May 1998

Boxscore

Norway	49–55	Cyprus
Scoring by half: 34–26, 15–29
Pts: Bryn 21; Rebs: Sonsteby 8 Asts: Gjerde 2		Pts: Stylianides 23; Rebs: Zachariou 11; Asts: Zachariou 4

Helsinki

20 May 1998

Boxscore

Luxembourg	52–94	Switzerland
Scoring by half: 30–61, 22–33
Pts: Feyder 17; Rebs: Maes 5 Asts: Adam 6		Pts: Clément 16; Rebs: Gojanovic, Ceresa 6 Asts: Maggi 4

Helsinki

20 May 1998

Boxscore

Austria	53–76	Finland
Scoring by half: 28–45, 25–31
Pts: Asceric 12; Rebs: Asceric, Volcic 5 Asts: Asceric 2		Pts: Möttölä 28; Rebs: Markkanen 9 Asts: Lehtonen 7

Helsinki

21 May 1998

Boxscore

Ireland	66–69	Norway
Scoring by half: 38–42, 28–27
Pts: Richardson 25; Rebs: Callahan 15; Asts: Maguire 2		Pts: Bryn 15; Rebs: Sonsteby 7 Asts: Eckhoff 6

Helsinki

21 May 1998

Boxscore

Cyprus	52–38	Luxembourg
Scoring by half: 25–12, 27–26
Pts: Stylianides 13; Rebs: Antoniou 10; Asts: Georgiou 4		Pts: Wohl 12; Rebs: Horsmans 9 Asts: Feyder, Wolter 1

Helsinki

21 May 1998

Boxscore

Switzerland	73–86	Austria
Scoring by half: 33–36, 40–50
Pts: Gojanovic, Mrazek 19; Rebs: Ceresa 6 Asts: Koller 5		Pts: Stazic 26; Rebs: Stazic 10; Asts: Stazic 5

Helsinki

22 May 1998

Boxscore

Luxembourg	59–73	Ireland
Scoring by half: 30–39, 29–34
Pts: Adam 21; Rebs: Wohl 8 Asts: Adam 4		Pts: Phelan 19; Rebs: Callahan 12; Asts: O'Connell 3

Helsinki

22 May 1998

Boxscore

Austria	63–49	Cyprus
Scoring by half: 28–21, 35–28
Pts: Asceric 27; Rebs: Asceric 13; Asts: Asceric 3		Pts: Antoniou 16; Rebs: Antoniou, Zachariou 3 Asts: Stylianides 6

Helsinki

22 May 1998

Boxscore

Finland	80–59	Switzerland
Scoring by half: 30–21, 50–38
Pts: Luhtanen 16; Rebs: Möttölä 6 Asts: Lehtonen 11		Pts: Gojanovic 26; Rebs: Valis, Mrazek, Koller 4 Asts: Mrazek 3

Helsinki
Attendance: 1,000

23 May 1998

Boxscore

Norway	100–67	Luxembourg
Scoring by half: 45–26, 55–41
Pts: Erlandsen 17; Rebs: Loftesnes 14; Asts: Eckhoff 4		Pts: Feyder 20; Rebs: Feyder 12; Asts: Wohl 3

Helsinki

23 May 1998

Boxscore

Ireland	74–89	Austria
Scoring by half: 35–49, 39–40
Pts: Callahan 15; Rebs: Callahan 17; Asts: O'Connell 3		Pts: Stazic 33; Rebs: Volcic 11; Asts: Hajda 4

Helsinki

23 May 1998

Boxscore

Cyprus	34–87	Finland
Scoring by half: 16–35, 18–52
Pts: Anastasiadis 9 Rebs: Antoniou, Anastasiadis, Zachariou 3		Pts: Pratesi 25; Rebs: Pehkonen 8 Asts: Vekkilä 5

Helsinki

24 May 1998

Boxscore

Austria	70–81	Norway
Scoring by half: 38–51, 32–30
Pts: Volcic 22; Rebs: Volcic 9 Asts: Lutz, Volcic, Stazic 2		Pts: Sonsteby 22; Rebs: Sonsteby 8 Asts: Sonsteby, Eckhoff 4

Helsinki

24 May 1998

Boxscore

Switzerland	47–52	Cyprus
Scoring by half: 27–21, 20–31
Pts: Clément 14; Rebs: Gojanovic 6 Asts: Mrazek 3		Pts: Anastasiadis 12; Rebs: Antoniou, Anastasiadis 6 Asts: Stylianides 2

Helsinki

24 May 1998

Boxscore

Finland	89–79	Ireland
Scoring by half: 43–38, 46–41
Pts: Lehtonen 18; Rebs: Luhtanen 7 Asts: Lehtonen 7		Pts: Callahan 21; Rebs: Callahan, O'Connell 8 Asts: Callahan 5

Helsinki

== Qualifying round ==
Qualified for the semi-final round

=== Group A (Kristiansand, Norway) ===
Times given below are in Central European Summer Time (UTC+02:00).

Team	Pld	W	L	PF	PA	PD	Pts
Latvia	3	3	0	312	213	+99	6
Netherlands	3	2	1	264	217	+47	5
Luxembourg	3	1	2	224	284	−60	4
Norway	3	0	3	219	305	−86	3

21 May 1999
18:00

Boxscore

Luxembourg	65–106	Latvia
Scoring by half: 36–20, 29–46
Pts: Feyder 17; Rebs: Wohl 5 Asts: Schiltz, Becker, Diederich 3		Pts: Bagatskis 26; Rebs: Sneps 10; Asts: Buskevics 6

Vågsbygdhallen, Kristiansand, Norway

21 May 1999
20:00

Boxscore

Netherlands	94–63	Norway
Scoring by half: 42–23, 52–40
Pts: Huijbens 21; Rebs: Nahar 9 Asts: Krieger 5		Pts: Bryn 16; Rebs: Loftesnes 9 Asts: Elsafadi 6

Vågsbygdhallen, Kristiansand, Norway

22 May 1999
15:00

Boxscore

Latvia	92–74	Netherlands
Scoring by half: 52–32, 40–42
Pts: Bagatskis 23; Rebs: Sturms 7 Asts: Sneps 6		Pts: Nahar 19; Rebs: Huijbens, Van Paassen 5 Asts: Van Rootselaar, Van Paassen 2

Vågsbygdhallen, Kristiansand, Norway

22 May 1999
17:00

Boxscore

Norway	82–97	Luxembourg
Scoring by half: 42–45, 40–52
Pts: Bryn 15; Rebs: Sonsteby, Fritzen 6 Asts: Okoroafor 4		Pts: Schiltz 24; Rebs: Feyder 10; Asts: Diederich 5

Vågsbygdhallen, Kristiansand, Norway

23 May 1999
14:00

Boxscore

Luxembourg	62–96	Netherlands
Scoring by half: 35–46, 27–50
Pts: Feyder 25; Rebs: Schiltz 6 Asts: Schiltz 3		Pts: Huijbens 24; Rebs: Huijbens 11; Asts: Krieger 8

Vågsbygdhallen, Kristiansand, Norway

23 May 1999
16:00

Boxscore

Latvia	114–74	Norway
Scoring by half: 54–30, 60–44
Pts: Bagatskis 19; Rebs: Bagatskis 7 Asts: Stelmahers 5		Pts: Loftesnes 19; Rebs: Fritzen, Bryn 8 Asts: Taheri 3

Vågsbygdhallen, Kristiansand, Norway

=== Group B (Fribourg, Switzerland) ===
Times given below are in Central European Summer Time (UTC+02:00).

Team	Pld	W	L	PF	PA	PD	Pts	Tie
Belgium	5	5	0	371	325	+46	10	
Portugal	5	3	2	365	365	0	8	1–0
Switzerland	5	3	2	362	350	+12	8	0–1
Georgia	5	2	3	362	413	−51	7	
Ireland	5	1	4	374	378	−4	6	1–0
Denmark	5	1	4	355	358	−3	6	0–1

19 May 1999
16:00

Boxscore

Denmark	50–75	Ireland
Scoring by half: 29–47, 21–28
Pts: Andersen 17; Rebs: Andersen 7 Asts: Sorensen 4		Pts: Callahan, O'Connell 16; Rebs: Callahan 16; Asts: Fulton 4

Fribourg, Switzerland

19 May 1999
18:00

Boxscore

Portugal	59–71	Belgium
Scoring by half: 35–39, 24–32
Pts: Gómez Marques Pinto 17; Rebs: Dias da Silva 6 Asts: Machado Gomes, Gómez Marques Pinto, A. Selores Ramos 2		Pts: Stas 14; Rebs: Struelens 9 Asts: Jaumin 4

Fribourg, Switzerland

19 May 1999
20:30

Boxscore

Georgia	66–85	Switzerland
Scoring by half: 29–44, 37–41
Pts: Natsvlishvili 18; Rebs: Natsvlishvili 11; Asts: Tortladze 2		Pts: Mrazek 25; Rebs: Grimes, Mrazek 6 Asts: Koller 11

Fribourg, Switzerland

20 May 1999
16:00

Boxscore

Belgium	71–66	Denmark
Scoring by half: 39–41, 32–25
Pts: Stas 25; Rebs: Goethals 11; Asts: Struelens 3		Pts: Larsen 21; Rebs: Larsen 8 Asts: Sorensen 6

Fribourg, Switzerland

20 May 1999
18:00

Boxscore

Ireland	78–80	Georgia
Scoring by half: 40–40, 38–40
Pts: Callahan 22; Rebs: Callahan 12; Asts: Callahan 6		Pts: Natsvlishvili 22; Rebs: Natsvlishvili 12; Asts: Jgenti 6

Fribourg, Switzerland

20 May 1999
20:00

Boxscore

Switzerland	71–75	Portugal
Scoring by half: 34–35, 37–40
Pts: Mrazek 22; Rebs: Valis 7 Asts: Mrazek 3		Pts: A. Selores Ramos 23; Rebs: Gómez Marques Pinto 9 Asts: Reis Veiga Perdigão, Gómez Marques Pinto 4

Fribourg, Switzerland

21 May 1999
16:00

Boxscore

Georgia	63–76	Belgium
Scoring by half: 35–38, 28–38
Pts: Boisa 22; Rebs: Natsvlishvili 6 Asts: Tortladze 3		Pts: Struelens 15; Rebs: Goethals 7 Asts: Stas, Struelens 4

Fribourg, Switzerland

21 May 1999
18:00

Boxscore

Denmark	63–66	Portugal
Scoring by half: 22–35, 41–31
Pts: Andersen 18; Rebs: Andersen 15; Asts: Jensen 3		Pts: A. Selores Ramos 14; Rebs: Dias da Silva 6 Asts: Costa 4

Fribourg, Switzerland

21 May 1999
20:30

Boxscore

Ireland	68–69	Switzerland
Scoring by half: 33–34, 35–35
Pts: Callahan 21; Rebs: Callahan 10; Asts: Lacey 4		Pts: Valis 17; Rebs: Valis 5 Asts: Mrazek, Koller 6

Fribourg, Switzerland

22 May 1999
14:00

Boxscore

Portugal	65–75	Georgia
Scoring by half: 29–30, 36–45
Pts: Gómez Marques Pinto 20; Rebs: Amorim dos Santos, Gómez Marques Pinto 7 Asts: Reis Veiga Perdigão 5		Pts: Natsvlishvili 28; Rebs: Natsvlishvili 7 Asts: Chkheidze, Jgenti 3

Fribourg, Switzerland

22 May 1999
16:00

Boxscore

Belgium	79–68	Ireland
Scoring by half: 37 –27, 42 –41
Pts: Cleymans 18; Rebs: Struelens, Goethals 7 Asts: Jaumin 6		Pts: O'Connell 19; Rebs: Callahan 13; Asts: Callahan, O'Connell 2

Fribourg, Switzerland

22 May 1999
18:00

Boxscore

Switzerland	68–67	Denmark
Scoring by half: 34–34, 34–33
Pts: Mrazek 14; Rebs: Mrazek 4 Asts: Koller 5		Pts: Larsen 19; Rebs: Larsen 8 Asts: Larsen, Quiding, Sorensen, Rasmussen 2

Fribourg, Switzerland

23 May 1999
14:00

Boxscore

Ireland	85–100	Portugal
Scoring by half: 46–48, 39–52
Pts: O'Connell 22; Rebs: O'Connell 11; Asts: Fulton 4		Pts: Gómez Marques Pinto 22; Rebs: Gómez Marques Pinto 3 Asts: Dias da Silva 4

Fribourg, Switzerland

23 May 1999
16:00

Boxscore

Georgia	78–109	Denmark
Scoring by half: 37–63, 41–46
Pts: Berdzenishvili, Bezhanishvili 16; Rebs: Bezhanishvili 9 Asts: Boisa 2		Pts: Andersen 22; Rebs: Andersen 9 Asts: Jensen 5

Fribourg, Switzerland

23 May 1999
18:00

Boxscore

Belgium	74–69	Switzerland
Scoring by half: 38–36, 36–33
Pts: Stas 22; Rebs: Goethals 12; Asts: Jaumin 6		Pts: Mrazek 23; Rebs: Valis 8 Asts: Grimes, Koller 3

Fribourg, Switzerland

=== Group C (Spišská Nová Ves, Slovakia) ===
Times given below are in Central European Summer Time (UTC+02:00).

Team	Pld	W	L	PF	PA	PD	Pts	Tie
Belarus	5	4	1	364	339	+25	9	1–0
Slovakia	5	4	1	400	311	+89	9	0–1
Iceland	5	3	2	367	338	+29	8	1–0
Romania	5	3	2	375	349	+26	8	0–1
Cyprus	5	1	4	328	368	−40	6	
Wales	5	0	5	351	480	−129	5	

19 May 1999
15:00

Boxscore

Cyprus	69–74	Iceland
Scoring by half: 30–38, 39–36
Pts: Michail 13; Rebs: Kyriakides, Michail, Kyriacou 4 Asts: Kyriacou 3		Pts: Gudfinnsson, Hardarson 18; Rebs: Bragason 13; Asts: Gudfinnsson 4

Spišská Nová Ves, Slovak Republic

19 May 1999
17:00

Boxscore

Slovakia	104–68	Wales
Scoring by half: 51–23, 53–45
Pts: Andruska 24; Rebs: Micuda, Andruska 7 Asts: Toya 7		Pts: Robbins 13; Rebs: Robbins 8 Asts: Hall, Alexander 2

Spišská Nová Ves, Slovak Republic

19 May 1999
19:00

Boxscore

Romania	81–67	Belarus
Scoring by half: 43–32, 38–35
Pts: Lapuste 22; Rebs: Alecu 8 Asts: Alecu 5		Pts: Koul 19; Rebs: Svetnik 9 Asts: Krivonos, Vasileuka, Svetnik, Khamenia, Radzionau, Aliakseyeu 1

Spišská Nová Ves, Slovak Republic

20 May 1999
15:00

Boxscore

Wales	81–108	Iceland
Scoring by half: 32–50, 49–58
Pts: Hall 20; Rebs: Longman 6 Asts: Hall, Godfrey, Weedall 2		Pts: Bragason 22; Rebs: Bragason 17; Asts: Ragnarsson 12

Spišská Nová Ves, Slovak Republic

20 May 1999
17:00

Boxscore

Slovakia	90–59	Romania
Scoring by half: 46 –24, 44 –35
Pts: Petruška 19; Rebs: Petruška, Rancik, Micuda 6 Asts: Toya 4		Pts: Voinescu 15; Rebs: Stanescu 6 Asts: Alecu 2

Spišská Nová Ves, Slovak Republic

20 May 1999
19:00

Boxscore

Belarus	70–51	Cyprus
Scoring by half: 27–26, 43–25
Pts: Koul 17; Rebs: Koul 6 Asts: Bahdanovich 4		Pts: Antoniou 18; Rebs: Kyriakides 7 Asts: Kyriacou 2

Spišská Nová Ves, Slovak Republic

21 May 1999
15:00

Boxscore

Romania	96–53	Wales
Scoring by half: 52–24, 44–29
Pts: Torday 18; Rebs: Torday 8 Asts: Alecu, Voinescu 4		Pts: Robbins 15; Rebs: Longman, Robbins, Weedall 6 Asts: Weedall, Stone, Hall 2

Spišská Nová Ves, Slovak Republic

21 May 1999
17:00

Boxscore

Cyprus	64–72	Slovakia
Scoring by half: 25–28, 39–44
Pts: Antoniou 20; Rebs: Antoniou 4 Asts: Zachariou 3		Pts: Rancik 18; Rebs: Micuda 8 Asts: Lovik 2

Spišská Nová Ves, Slovak Republic

21 May 1999
19:00

Boxscore

Iceland	62–63	Belarus
Scoring by half: 32–29, 30–34
Pts: Gudfinnsson 18; Rebs: Arnarson 4 Asts: Arnarson, Gudfinnsson 3		Pts: Krivonos 22; Rebs: Krivonos 10; Asts: Krivonos 2

Spišská Nová Ves, Slovak Republic

22 May 1999
15:00

Boxscore

Romania	75–68	Cyprus
Scoring by half: 40–36, 38–29
Pts: Voinescu 17; Rebs: Stanescu 10; Asts: Alecu 10		Pts: Kyriakides 13; Rebs: Antoniou 7 Asts: Palalas 3

Spišská Nová Ves, Slovak Republic

22 May 1999
17:00

Boxscore

Slovakia	64–49	Iceland
Scoring by half: 26 –25, 38 –24
Pts: Lovik 14; Rebs: Petruška 10; Asts: Petruška, Toya, Lovik 2		Pts: Bragason, Stefánsson 10; Rebs: Hardarson 5 Asts: Arnarson, Gudfinnsson 2

Spišská Nová Ves, Slovak Republic

22 May 1999
19:00

Boxscore

Wales	75–93	Belarus
Scoring by half: 30–43, 45–50
Pts: Walker 19; Rebs: Longman 9 Asts: Weedall, Robbins 3		Pts: Pyntsikau 16; Rebs: Bykau 7 Asts: Pyntsikau, Vasileuka 3

Spišská Nová Ves, Slovak Republic

23 May 1999
14:00

Boxscore

Iceland	74–61	Romania
Scoring by half: 42–30, 32–31
Pts: Arnarson 22; Rebs: Bragason 10; Asts: Gudfinnsson 4		Pts: Stanescu 17; Rebs: Alecu 10; Asts: Voinescu 2

Spišská Nová Ves, Slovak Republic

23 May 1999
16:00

Boxscore

Cyprus	79–74	Wales
Scoring by half: 45–43, 34–31
Pts: Michail 25; Rebs: Michail 12; Asts: Antoniou 3		Pts: Longman, Hall 15; Rebs: Longman 9 Asts: Walker 4

Spišská Nová Ves, Slovak Republic

23 May 1999
18:00

Boxscore

Belarus	71–70	Slovakia
Scoring by half: 37–32, 34–38
Pts: Svetnik 15; Rebs: Svetnik 9 Asts: Svetnik 3		Pts: Rancik 17; Rebs: Micuda 7 Asts: Toya 5

Spišská Nová Ves, Slovak Republic

== Semi-final round ==
Qualified for EuroBasket 2001

=== Group A ===
Team	Pld	W	L	PF	PA	PD	Pts	Tie
Croatia	10	10	0	856	693	+163	20	
Latvia	10	6	4	843	774	+69	16	
England	10	5	5	739	736	+3	15	1–1, 1.000, 739
Hungary	10	5	5	698	704	−6	15	1–1, 1.000, 698
Switzerland	10	4	6	678	738	−60	14	
Slovakia	10	0	10	630	799	−169	10	

Rules=1) Points; 2) Head-to-head results; 3) Points difference; 4) Points scored.

24 Nov 1999
18:00

Boxscore

Croatia	88–54	Slovakia
Scoring by half: 45–28, 43–26
Pts: Vujcic 15; Rebs: Vujcic 11; Asts: Mulaomerovic, Sesar 4		Pts: Andruska 16; Rebs: Micuda 10; Asts: Snopko 3

Dvorana Mladosti, Rijeka
Attendance: 1,500
Referees: Georgiy Valtchev (BUL), Andreas Roth (AUT)

24 Nov 1999
18:30

Boxscore

Latvia	68–72	Hungary
Scoring by half: 34–28, 34–44
Pts: Bagatskis 16; Rebs: Sturms 8 Asts: Miglinieks 4		Pts: Gulyas 27; Rebs: Gulyas 9 Asts: Gulyas, Fodor, Kálmán, Mészáros 2

Arena of BK Ventspils, Ventspils
Attendance: 2,000
Referees: Ivan Zachara (CZE), Grzegorz Ziemblicki (POL)

24 Nov 1999
19:30

Boxscore

England	60–73	Switzerland
Scoring by half: 31–29, 29–44
Pts: Haslam 14; Rebs: Mensah-Bonsu 7 Asts: Bucknall 5		Pts: Mrazek 17; Rebs: Valis 8 Asts: Mrazek 6

Sheffield
Referees: Jan Herweijer (NED), Serge De Coster (BEL)

27 Nov 1999
16:30

Boxscore

Slovakia	73–81	England
Scoring by half: 31–40, 42–41
Pts: Lovik 18; Rebs: Andruska 8 Asts: Andruska, Wimmer 2		Pts: Bucknall 16; Rebs: Betts 7 Asts: Bucknall 7

Bratislava
Attendance: 2,000
Referees: Leszek Rakoczy (POL), Luigi Lamonica (ITA)

27 Nov 1999
17:30

Boxscore

Switzerland	76–91	Latvia
Scoring by half: 34–46, 42–45
Pts: Mrazek 24; Rebs: Koller 7 Asts: Koller, Sassella 3		Pts: Bagatskis, Vītols 20; Rebs: Bagatskis, Sturms 5 Asts: Miglinieks 10

Salle Polysports du Rocher, Nyon
Referees: Alberto Grossi (ITA), Andrej Lovsin (SLO)

27 Nov 1999
18:30

Boxscore

Hungary	66–67	Croatia
Scoring by half: 30–32, 36–35
Pts: Halm 18; Rebs: Gulyas 9 Asts: Kálmán 4		Pts: Prkácin, Vujcic 15; Rebs: Vujcic 6 Asts: Mulaomerovic 6

Zalaegerszeg
Attendance: 4,500
Referees: Nikolaos Zavlanos (GRE), Borys Ryzhyk (UKR)

1 Dec 1999
18:00

Boxscore

Hungary	68–52	Slovakia
Scoring by half: 23–35, 45–17
Pts: Fodor 22; Rebs: Czigler 9 Asts: Halm, Kálmán 3		Pts: Andruska 12; Rebs: Andruska 5 Asts: Timko, Bohunicky, Snopko 1

Szekesfehervar
Attendance: 2,000
Referees: Efim Resser (GER), Sasa Pukl (SLO)

1 Dec 1999
18:00

Boxscore

Croatia	93–53	Switzerland
Scoring by half: 53–24, 40–29
Pts: Sesar 18; Rebs: Bagaric, Vujcic 7 Asts: Mulaomerovic 5		Pts: Mrazek, Valis 11; Rebs: Valis, Grimes 4 Asts: Mrazek 4

Sportska Dvorana Gospino Polje, Dubrovnik
Attendance: 2,000
Referees: Pavel Volejník (CZE), Mauro Pozzana (ITA)

1 Dec 1999
18:30

Boxscore

Latvia	90–97	England
Scoring by half: 43–41, 47–56
Pts: Helmanis, Šneps 19; Rebs: Sturms 7 Asts: Miglinieks, Šneps 6		Pts: Gardiner 25; Rebs: Betts 8 Asts: Mensah-Bonsu 3

Riga Sports Palace, Riga
Attendance: 3,220
Referees: Mika Moberg (FIN), Nikolaos Mpotitsis (SWE)

23 Feb 2000
18:00

Boxscore

Slovakia	61–79	Latvia
Scoring by half: 33–40, 28–39
Pts: Baláz 18; Rebs: Petruška 12; Asts: Jakabovic, Baláz 3		Pts: Bagatskis 32; Rebs: Bagatskis 9 Asts: Miglinieks 7

Arena of BC Slovakofarma, Pezinok
Attendance: 1,200
Referees: Marek Nowicki (POL), Andrej Jelen (SLO)

23 Feb 2000
19:30

Boxscore

England	77–81	Croatia
Scoring by half: 44–39, 33–42
Pts: Huggins 18; Rebs: Betts 11; Asts: Bucknall 3		Pts: Mršić, Giricek 20; Rebs: Vujcic 10; Asts: Krstic, Mulaomerovic 3

Birmingham
Attendance: 1,852
Referees: Pascal Dorizon (FRA), Nikolaos Mpotitsis (SWE)

23 Feb 2000
20:00

Boxscore

Switzerland	76–70	Hungary
Scoring by half: 44–38, 32–32
Pts: Valis 26; Rebs: Valis 7 Asts: Mrazek 3		Pts: Sitku 14; Rebs: Gulyas 5 Asts: Halm 2

Istituto Elvetico, Lugano
Referees: Goran Radonjic (FRA), Andreas Roth (AUT)

26 Feb 2000
17:30

Boxscore

Switzerland	73–58	Slovakia
Scoring by half: 36–34, 37–24
Pts: Mrazek, Sassella 15; Rebs: Valis 8 Asts: Koller 5		Pts: Micuda 12; Rebs: Svitek 5 Asts: Micuda 2

Istituto Elvetico, Lugano
Referees: Sasa Pukl (SLO), Mauro Pozzana (ITA)

26 Feb 2000
18:00

Boxscore

Croatia	89–88	Latvia
Scoring by half: 48–50, 41–38
Pts: Giricek 33; Rebs: Giricek 7 Asts: Krstic, Mulaomerovic 4		Pts: Stelmahers 27; Rebs: Sneps 7 Asts: Stelmahers 5

Sportska Dvornana Brezovica, Sisak
Attendance: 2,200
Referees: Gennaro Colucci (ITA), Marek Cmikiewicz (POL)

26 Feb 2000
19:00

Boxscore

Hungary	96–89 (OT)	England
Scoring by half: 42–39, 36–39 Overtime: 18–11
Pts: Dávid 26; Rebs: Dávid 7 Asts: Kálmán 9		Pts: Bucknall 31; Rebs: Carter 4 Asts: Betts 3

Budapest
Attendance: 1,500
Referees: Karel Bruna (CZE), Milivoje Jovcic (SRB)

22 Nov 2000
18:00

Boxscore

Slovakia	73–92	Croatia
Scoring by quarter: 19–22, 17–25, 13–26, 24–19
Pts: Micuda 21; Rebs: Praznovsky 6 Asts: Stec 5		Pts: Mulaomerovic 30; Rebs: Ruzic 6 Asts: Mulaomerovic 3

Lucenec
Attendance: 2,500
Referees: Giampaolo Cicoria (ITA), Erich Kratschmer (AUT)

22 Nov 2000
19:00

Boxscore

Switzerland	53–61	England
Scoring by quarter: 12–12, 14–16, 13–16, 14–17
Pts: Mrazek 16; Rebs: Polite 14; Asts: Koller 2		Pts: Dorsey 17; Rebs: Betts 13; Asts: Bucknall, Huggins 3

Istituto Elvetico, Lugano
Attendance: 2,400
Referees: Fabio Facchini (ITA), Chantal Julien (FRA)

22 Nov 2000
20:00

Boxscore

Hungary	63–82	Latvia
Scoring by quarter: 17–17, 17–18, 9–25, 20–22
Pts: Kálmán 21; Rebs: Czigler, Gulyas 6 Asts: Kálmán, Németh 3		Pts: Stelmahers 31; Rebs: Bagatskis 8 Asts: Miglinieks 6

Paks
Attendance: 1,500
Referees: Sasa Pukl (SLO), Ilija Belosevic (SRB)

25 Nov 2000
17:30

Boxscore

Croatia	79–58	Hungary
Scoring by quarter: 24–10, 19–21, 18–9, 18–18
Pts: Nicevic 20; Rebs: Nicevic 7 Asts: Mulaomerovic 5		Pts: Sitku 23; Rebs: Sitku 6 Asts: Fodor, Sitku, Kálmán 2

Sports Hall "Gradski Vrt", Osijek
Attendance: 1,700
Referees: Ivo Dolinek (CZE), Paolo Taurino (ITA)

25 Nov 2000
19:00

Boxscore

Latvia	92–67	Switzerland
Scoring by quarter: 12–13, 23–21, 27–22, 30–11
Pts: Stelmahers 27; Rebs: Helmanis 8 Asts: Stelmahers 6		Pts: Mrazek 26; Rebs: Polite, Ceresa 7 Asts: Koller 4

Riga Sports Palace, Riga
Attendance: 4,900
Referees: Mats Bjarnemar (SWE), Grzegorz Ziemblicki (POL)

25 Nov 2000
19:30

Boxscore

England	74–62	Slovakia
Scoring by quarter: 22–13, 13–17, 20–20, 19–12
Pts: Huggins 20; Rebs: Huggins 10; Asts: Huggins 4		Pts: Wimmer 13; Rebs: Stec, Praznovsky, Wimmer, Micuda, Krämer 5 Asts: Bohunicky 4

Coventry
Referees: José Araujo (POR), Manuel Alzuria (ESP)

29 Nov 2000
18:00

Boxscore

Slovakia	61–81	Hungary
Scoring by quarter: 12–20, 15–16, 23–24, 11–21
Pts: Praznovsky 14; Rebs: Stec 9 Asts: Stec, Gavlák 2		Pts: Sitku 24; Rebs: Czigler 13; Asts: Czigler, Fodor, Kálmán 2

Arena of BK VSDS Žilina, Žilina
Attendance: 1,800
Referees: Volodymyr Drabikovskyi (UKR), Milivoje Jovcic (SRB)

29 Nov 2000
19:30

Boxscore

England	69–74	Latvia
Scoring by quarter: 11–16, 26–26, 10–15, 22–17
Pts: Betts 17; Rebs: Betts 14; Asts: Huggins 5		Pts: Bagatskis 33; Rebs: Sturms 9 Asts: Miglinieks 8

Coventry
Referees: Goran Radonjic (FRA), Björn Braathen (NOR)

29 Nov 2000
20:30

Boxscore

Switzerland	74–83	Croatia
Scoring by quarter: 30–25, 17–17, 16–21, 11–20
Pts: Mrazek 20; Rebs: Valis, Jaquier, Ceresa 4 Asts: Koller 5		Pts: Marcelic 27; Rebs: Krstic 7 Asts: Krstic, J. Ruzic 6

Istituto Elvetico, Lugano
Attendance: 1,000
Referees: Pierre-Yves Bichon (FRA), Marco Giansanti (ITA)

24 Jan 2001
18:00

Boxscore

Hungary	72–71	Switzerland
Scoring by quarter: 19–23, 20–15, 19–15, 14–18
Pts: Kálmán 25; Rebs: Czigler 6 Asts: Kálmán 3		Pts: Sassella 32; Rebs: Ceresa 6 Asts: Fernandez 2

Salgotarjan
Attendance: 1,000
Referees: Ivan Zachara (CZE), Erich Kratschmer (AUT)

24 Jan 2001
19:00

Boxscore

Latvia	101–78	Slovakia
Scoring by quarter: 20–22, 27–21, 28–15, 26–20
Pts: Stelmahers, Helmanis 34; Rebs: Helmanis 7 Asts: Miglinieks 12		Pts: Krämer 23; Rebs: Znanec 5 Asts: Znanec 3

Riga Sports Palace, Riga
Attendance: 4,980
Referees: Virginijus Dovidavicius (LTU), Tomasz Kudlicki (POL)

24 Jan 2001
20:15

Boxscore

Croatia	82–72	England
Scoring by quarter: 18–16, 22–22, 18–17, 24–17
Pts: Sesar 18; Rebs: Vujcic 9 Asts: Sesar 4		Pts: Bucknall 24; Rebs: Huggins 7 Asts: Baker, Betts 2

Sportska Dvorana Gospino Polje, Dubrovnik
Attendance: 1,500
Referees: Andreas Roth (AUT), Giampaolo Cicoria (ITA)

27 Jan 2001
18:00

Boxscore

Slovakia	58–62	Switzerland
Scoring by quarter: 13–19, 16–16, 17–13, 12–14
Pts: Krämer 25; Rebs: Micuda 10; Asts: Micuda 3		Pts: Sassella 17; Rebs: Edwards 7 Asts: Koller 2

Lucenec
Attendance: 2,000
Referees: Kamen Toshev (BUL), Grzegorz Ziemblicki (POL)

27 Jan 2001
19:00

Boxscore

Latvia	78–102	Croatia
Scoring by quarter: 23–28, 16–26, 26–28, 13–20
Pts: Stelmahers 24; Rebs: Laksa, Helmanis 6 Asts: Miglinieks 8		Pts: Marcelic 21; Rebs: Vrankovic 8 Asts: Krstic 10

Riga Sports Palace, Riga
Attendance: 4,840
Referees: Fabio Facchini (ITA), Oscar Lefwerth (SWE)

27 Jan 2001
19:30

Boxscore

England	59–52	Hungary
Scoring by quarter: 18–9, 13–15, 13–12, 15–16
Pts: Bucknall 21; Rebs: Betts 17; Asts: Williams, Bucknall, Betts 2		Pts: Kálmán 16; Rebs: Czigler 11; Asts: Kálmán, Mészáros 4

Coventry
Attendance: 2,165
Referees: Bruno Gasperin (FRA), Juan Redondo (ESP)

=== Group B ===
Team	Pld	W	L	PF	PA	PD	Pts
Greece	10	9	1	805	667	+138	19
Estonia	10	7	3	817	772	+45	17
Poland	10	6	4	775	754	+21	16
Czech Republic	10	5	5	772	788	−16	15
Belarus	10	2	8	734	780	−46	12
Austria	10	1	9	669	811	−142	11

24 Nov 1999
18:00

Boxscore

Czech Republic	91–70	Belarus
Scoring by half: 41–38, 50–32
Pts: Zídek 29; Rebs: Bečka, Sokolovský, Zídek 5 Asts: Czudek 9		Pts: Koul 20; Rebs: Baidakou, Koul 8 Asts: Meshcharakou 2

Arena of BK Opava, Opava
Attendance: 1,200
Referees: Danko Radic (CRO), Sasa Pukl (SLO)

24 Nov 1999
18:05

Boxscore

Poland	81–73	Austria
Scoring by half: 49–35, 32–38
Pts: Pluta 19; Rebs: Korytek 9 Asts: Jankowski, Zielinski 2		Pts: Asceric 34; Rebs: Asceric 8 Asts: Asceric 6

Gryfia, Slupsk
Attendance: 2,500
Referees: Volodymyr Drabikovskyi (UKR), Andrei Bostan (MDA)

24 Nov 1999
18:30

Boxscore

Estonia	59–70	Greece
Scoring by half: 29–34, 30–36
Pts: Kullamäe 16; Rebs: Müürsepp 8 Asts: Kullamäe, Pehka 2		Pts: Oikonomou 15; Rebs: Oikonomou, Giannoulis 8 Asts: Giannoulis 3

Tallinn
Attendance: 2,000
Referees: Lars Klaar (SWE), Milivoje Jovcic (SRB)

27 Nov 1999
18:00

Boxscore

Greece	74–54	Czech Republic
Scoring by half: 37–32, 37–22
Pts: Liadelis 15; Rebs: Giannoulis 6 Asts: Oikonomou 5		Pts: Zídek 15; Rebs: Zídek 8 Asts: Czudek 4

NSC Demetrios Tofalos, Patras
Attendance: 3,500
Referees: György Varadi (HUN), Gennaro Colucci (ITA)

27 Nov 1999
18:00

Boxscore

Austria	77–89	Estonia
Scoring by half: 39–43, 38–46
Pts: Asceric 20; Rebs: Volcic 9 Asts: Volcic, Stazic 2		Pts: Müürsepp 31; Rebs: Müürsepp 10; Asts: Pehka 4

Arena of Arkadia Lions, Traiskirchen
Referees: Ivo Dolinek (CZE), Srdan Dozai (CRO)

27 Nov 1999
19:00

Boxscore

Belarus	76–81	Poland
Scoring by half: 41–39, 35–42
Pts: Meshcharakou 19; Rebs: Meshcharakou 9 Asts: Krivonos 5		Pts: Pluta 24; Rebs: Szybilski, Jankowski, Wilangowski 5 Asts: Jankowski, Pluta, Hyzy 2

Minsk
Attendance: 5,000
Referees: Kamen Toshev (BUL), Marian Oprea (ROU)

1 Dec 1999
18:00

Boxscore

Greece	85–66	Belarus
Scoring by half: 49–39, 36–27
Pts: Tsakalidis 16; Rebs: Tsakalidis 7 Asts: Sigalas, Sioutis 4		Pts: Koul 23; Rebs: Koul 8 Asts: Meshcharakou 5

Dimotiko Stadio Giorgos Vasilakopoulos, Pyrgos
Attendance: 3,500
Referees: Dubravko Muhvic (CRO), Fabio Facchini (ITA)

1 Dec 1999
18:00

Boxscore

Czech Republic	94–65	Austria
Scoring by half: 51–28, 43–37
Pts: Zídek 22; Rebs: Bečka 10; Asts: Beneč 6		Pts: Ašćerić 25; Rebs: Moschik 7 Asts: Lovrek 3

Arena of Mlékárna Kunín, Nový Jičín
Attendance: 1,000
Referees: Virginijus Dovidavicius (LTU), Goran Urukalo (CRO)

1 Dec 1999
18:30

Boxscore

Estonia	84–76	Poland
Scoring by half: 50–43, 34–33
Pts: Müürsepp 24; Rebs: Metstak 8 Asts: Kuusmaa 8		Pts: Wojcik 20; Rebs: Szybilski 7 Asts: Wilangowski 2

Tallinn
Attendance: 1,800
Referees: Ladislav Janac (SVK), Jan Gjettermann (DEN)

23 Feb 2000
18:00

Boxscore

Austria	70–77	Greece
Scoring by half: 41–41, 29–36
Pts: Asceric 17; Rebs: Asceric 9 Asts: Hajda, Renfroe, Volcic 3		Pts: Alvertis 23; Rebs: Papanikolaou 9 Asts: Alvertis, Dikoudis 3

Arena of Arkadia Lions, Traiskirchen
Attendance: 1,000
Referees: Petr Sudek (SVK), Roman Kolar (SLO)

23 Feb 2000
18:15

Boxscore

Poland	69–80	Czech Republic
Scoring by half: 24–41, 45–39
Pts: Jankowski, Hyzy 13; Rebs: Jankowski 6 Asts: Kościuk 3		Pts: Zídek 28; Rebs: Bečka, Zídek 8 Asts: Welsch 4

Pruszkow
Attendance: 3,000
Referees: Efim Resser (GER), Borys Ryzhyk (UKR)

23 Feb 2000
19:00

Boxscore

Belarus	66–81	Estonia
Scoring by half: 29–34, 37–47
Pts: Meshcharakou 24; Rebs: Meshcharakou 12; Asts: Meshcharakou 3		Pts: Müürsepp 19; Rebs: Müürsepp 10; Asts: Kullamäe 3

Minsk
Attendance: 4,000
Referees: Aleksander Gorshkov (RUS), Borys Shulga (UKR)

26 Feb 2000
17:00

Boxscore

Czech Republic	76–92	Estonia
Scoring by half: 41–42, 35–50
Pts: Welsch 15; Rebs: Sokolovský 5 Asts: Bečka 4		Pts: Kullamäe 29; Rebs: Kullamäe 5 Asts: Kuusmaa, Kullamäe 1

Sportcenter Sluneta, Ústí nad Labem
Attendance: 1,600
Referees: Hermann Latz (GER), Kamen Toshev (BUL)

26 Feb 2000
18:00

Boxscore

Greece	78–60	Poland
Scoring by half: 40–25, 38–35
Pts: Tsakalidis 18; Rebs: Dikoudis 4 Asts: Kalaitzis 6		Pts: Wilangowski 13; Rebs: Szybilski 10; Asts: Kosciuk, Jankowski, Wilangowski, Hyzy 1

Tenda Sports Hall, Kalamata
Attendance: 2,500
Referees: Volodymyr Drabikovskyi (UKR), Luigi Lamonica (ITA)

26 Feb 2000
19:00

Boxscore

Austria	68–66	Belarus
Scoring by half: 43–20, 25–46
Pts: Asceric 26; Rebs: Renfroe 8 Asts: Stazic 4		Pts: Baidakou 21; Rebs: Meshcharakou 12; Asts: Meshcharakou 4

Arena of Arkadia Lions, Traiskirchen
Referees: Dubravko Muhvic (CRO), Ilija Belosevic (SRB)

22 Nov 2000
16:45

Boxscore

Greece	92–73	Estonia
Scoring by quarter: 20–17, 26–21, 23–20, 23–15
Pts: Oikonomou 18; Rebs: Giannoulis 10; Asts: Oikonomou, Diamantopoulos 5		Pts: Müürsepp 18; Rebs: Müürsepp 7 Asts: Pehka 6

Filippos Amoridis Stadium, Xanthi
Attendance: 4,000
Referees: Tihomir Bubalo (SRB), Gennaro Colucci (ITA)

22 Nov 2000
19:00

Boxscore

Belarus	78–60	Czech Republic
Scoring by quarter: 18–12, 19–16, 19–15, 22–17
Pts: Baidakou 25; Rebs: Meshcharakou 10; Asts: Kojenets 4		Pts: Zídek 25; Rebs: Becka 7 Asts: Czudek, Benes 2

Minsk
Attendance: 4,000
Referees: Milivoje Jovcic (SRB), Peter Bodnar (HUN)

22 Nov 2000
19:00

Boxscore

Austria	69–94	Poland
Scoring by quarter: 14–23, 19–18, 23–27, 13–26
Pts: Stazic 25; Rebs: Renfroe 11; Asts: Stazic 4		Pts: Wojcik 26; Rebs: Tomczyk 8 Asts: Pluta 3

Arena of Arkadia Lions, Traiskirchen
Referees: Srdan Dozai (CRO), Roman Kolar (SLO)

25 Nov 2000
17:00

Boxscore

Czech Republic	76–92	Greece
Scoring by quarter: 11–20, 19–21, 25–29, 21–22
Pts: Trnka 19; Rebs: Becka, Welsch, Trnka 6 Asts: Becka 3		Pts: Alvertis 20; Rebs: Papanikolaou, Dikoudis, Giannoulis 4 Asts: Kalaitzis 2

Arena of BK Opava, Opava
Attendance: 1,200
Referees: Efim Resser (GER), Srdan Dozai (CRO)

25 Nov 2000
18:15

Boxscore

Poland	83–74	Belarus
Scoring by quarter: 23–22, 18–12, 21–18, 21–22
Pts: Wojcik 25; Rebs: Wojcik 9 Asts: Sidor 4		Pts: Krivonos 22; Rebs: Koul, Meshcharakou 5 Asts: Baidakou 4

Wrocław
Attendance: 5,000
Referees: Petr Sudek (SVK), Kestutis Pilipauskas (LTU)

25 Nov 2000
19:30

Boxscore

Estonia	79–60	Austria
Scoring by quarter: 18–20, 21–13, 18–10, 22–17
Pts: Pehka 16; Rebs: Metstak, Rumma 8 Asts: Kuusmaa 4		Pts: Volcic 31; Rebs: Volcic 10; Asts: Volcic 3

Tallinn
Attendance: 2,000
Referees: Petri Mäntylä (FIN), Oscar Lefwerth (SWE)

29 Nov 2000
18:00

Boxscore

Belarus	78–86	Greece
Scoring by quarter: 17–25, 22–26, 20–20, 19–15
Pts: Meshcharakou 23; Rebs: Meshcharakou 10; Asts: Krivonos, Meshcharakou 4		Pts: Alvertis 23; Rebs: Papanikolaou, Oikonomou, Papadopoulos, Giannoulis 4 Asts: Papaloukas 2

Minsk
Attendance: 4,000
Referees: Romualdas Brazauskas (LTU), György Varadi (HUN)

29 Nov 2000
18:15

Boxscore

Poland	81–73	Estonia
Scoring by quarter: 22–22, 18–13, 18–21, 23–17
Pts: Wojcik 21; Rebs: Tomczyk 9 Asts: Tomczyk, Sidor 3		Pts: Müürsepp 24; Rebs: Metstak 11; Asts: Rumma, Müürsepp, Pehka 3

Wrocław
Attendance: 6,000
Referees: Boris Schmidt (GER), Dubravko Muhvac (CRO)

29 Nov 2000
19:00

Boxscore

Austria	83–84	Czech Republic
Scoring by quarter: 17–19, 24–32, 20–21, 22–12
Pts: Volcic 25; Rebs: Renfroe 10; Asts: Renfroe, Buggelsheim 3		Pts: Welsch 25; Rebs: Trnka 7 Asts: Welsch 3

Arena of Oberwart Gunners, Oberwart
Referees: Tonci Anzulovic (CRO), Ilija Belosevic (SRB)

24 Jan 2001
18:30

Boxscore

Greece	76–50	Austria
Scoring by quarter: 20–16, 22–13, 13–13, 21–8
Pts: Dikoudis 19; Rebs: Rentzias 8 Asts: Papaloukas 8		Pts: Asceric, Weissenböck 11; Rebs: Volcic 12; Asts: Asceric 4

Nea Ionia Hall, Volos
Attendance: 2,000
Referees: Ilija Belosevic (SRB), Yair Michaelly (ISR)

24 Jan 2001
18:40

Boxscore

Czech Republic	72–69	Poland
Scoring by quarter: 15–17, 25–18, 16–13, 16–21
Pts: Welsch 21; Rebs: Bečka 13; Asts: Czudek, Welsch 1		Pts: Tomczyk 23; Rebs: Korytek 6 Asts: Wojcik 1

Arena of BK Opava, Opava
Attendance: 1,200
Referees: Romualdas Brazauskas (LTU), Sasa Pukl (SLO)

24 Jan 2001
19:30

Boxscore

Estonia	91–89	Belarus
Scoring by quarter: 23–22, 20–25, 24–21, 24–21
Pts: Müürsepp 31; Rebs: Müürsepp 6 Asts: Kuusmaa 9		Pts: Koul 26; Rebs: Koul 12; Asts: Krivonos 7

Tallinn
Attendance: 2,000
Referees: Kestutis Pilipauskas (LTU), Vladimir Dadugin (RUS)

27 Jan 2001
18:00

Boxscore

Belarus	71–54	Austria
Scoring by quarter: 12–19, 23–11, 16–14, 20–10
Pts: Koul 21; Rebs: Baidakou 7 Asts: Baidakou, Krivonos 3		Pts: Weissenböck 20; Rebs: Moschik, Volcic 7 Asts: Moschik, Mayer, Buggelsheim 1

Minsk
Attendance: 1,500
Referees: Ivo Dolinek (CZE), Dimitar Gologanov (BUL)

27 Jan 2001
18:15

Boxscore

Poland	81–75	Greece
Scoring by quarter: 22–15, 24–13, 17–22, 18–25
Pts: Wojcik 22; Rebs: Jankowski 9 Asts: Sidor, Pluta 4		Pts: Diamantopoulos 24; Rebs: Diamantopoulos 12; Asts: Diamantopoulos 3

Wrocław
Attendance: 4,500
Referees: Virginijus Dovidavicius (LTU), Milivoje Jovcic (SRB)

27 Jan 2001
19:30

Boxscore

Estonia	96–85	Czech Republic
Scoring by quarter: 31–17, 21–18, 23–16, 21–34
Pts: Müürsepp 26; Rebs: Müürsepp 8 Asts: Kuusmaa 9		Pts: Welsch 25; Rebs: Bečka 6 Asts: Kubálek 4

Tallinn
Attendance: 3,000
Referees: Gennaro Colucci (ITA), Dubravko Muhvic (CRO)

=== Group C ===
Team	Pld	W	L	PF	PA	PD	Pts	Tie
Israel	10	8	2	817	703	+114	18	
Bosnia and Herzegovina	10	6	4	781	760	+21	16	
Netherlands	10	5	5	752	742	+10	15	
Bulgaria	10	4	6	815	799	+16	14	2–0
Finland	10	4	6	795	880	−85	14	0–2
Sweden	10	3	7	762	838	−76	13	

24 Nov 1999
17:30

Boxscore

Bulgaria	72–74	Bosnia and Herzegovina
Scoring by half: 35–44, 37–30
Pts: Dimitrov 23; Rebs: Dimitrov 8 Asts: Petrov 4		Pts: Markovic Zoric 20; Rebs: Ovcina 6 Asts: Markovic Zoric, Mirkovic, Kahrimanovic 2

Metalni Konstrukci Hall, Pleven
Attendance: 1,000
Referees: Memduh Öget (TUR), Stylianos Koukoulekidis (GRE)

24 Nov 1999
19:00

Boxscore

Sweden	96–101	Finland
Scoring by half: 42–43, 54–58
Pts: Bergström 20; Rebs: Stümer 7 Asts: L. Larsson 7		Pts: Kuisma 29; Rebs: Luhtanen 8 Asts: Rannikko 5

Arena of Scania, Södertälje
Attendance: 1,720
Referees: Kestutis Pilipauskas (LTU), Marek Cmikiewicz (POL)

24 Nov 1999
20:45

Boxscore

Israel	90–61	Netherlands
Scoring by half: 40–27, 50–34
Pts: Sheffer, Kattache 17; Rebs: Henefeld, Sheffer 4 Asts: Kattache 8		Pts: Elson 20; Rebs: Elson 6 Asts: Krieger 8

Sport Palace, Tel Aviv
Attendance: 9,500
Referees: Tomislav Jovancic (SRB), Haluk Yesiloglu (TUR)

27 Nov 1999
14:45

Boxscore

Finland	67–72	Bulgaria
Scoring by half: 30–34, 37–38
Pts: Kuisma 18; Rebs: Kuisma 6 Asts: Rannikko 7		Pts: Minchev 23; Rebs: Natov 10; Asts: Natov 3

Attendance: 2,564
Referees: Romualdas Brazauskas (LTU), Vladimir Okhrimenko (RUS)

27 Nov 1999
19:30

Boxscore

Netherlands	61–66	Sweden
Scoring by half: 36–31, 25–35
Pts: Hammink 17; Rebs: Hammink 12; Asts: Goedee, Krieger 4		Pts: Bergström 15; Rebs: Stümer 7 Asts: L. Larsson 5

Topsportcentrum, Almere
Referees: Pascal Dorizon (FRA), Boris Schmidt (GER)

27 Nov 1999
20:15

Boxscore

Bosnia and Herzegovina	65–69	Israel
Scoring by half: 25–31, 40–38
Pts: Hukic 17; Rebs: Hukic 9 Asts: Firic, Mirkovic 2		Pts: Sheffer 19; Rebs: Sheffer 5 Asts: Sheffer 2

Sarajevo
Attendance: 3,000
Referees: Ladislav Janac (SVK), Recep Ankarali (TUR)

1 Dec 1999
17:30

Boxscore

Bulgaria	77–63	Sweden
Scoring by half: 36–35, 41–28
Pts: Stoykov 23; Rebs: Minchev 8 Asts: Koeshinov 3		Pts: Aulander 16; Rebs: Stümer 8 Asts: L. Larsson 1

Arena of Spartak, Pleven
Attendance: 1,000
Referees: Petr Sudek (SVK), Zoran Zlatevski (MKD)

1 Dec 1999
20:10

Boxscore

Bosnia and Herzegovina	79–70	Netherlands
Scoring by half: 44–41, 35–29
Pts: Markovic Zoric 38; Rebs: Leric 4 Asts: Mirkovic 2		Pts: Hammink 19; Rebs: Hammink 5 Asts: Hammink 2

Sarajevo
Attendance: 5,000
Referees: Karel Bruna (CZE), Zsolt Hartyani (HUN)

1 Dec 1999
20:45

Boxscore

Israel	93–68	Finland
Scoring by half: 52–32, 41–36
Pts: Kattache 28; Rebs: Shteinhaur 7 Asts: Henefeld 6		Pts: Kuisma, Pratesi 16; Rebs: Luhtanen 10; Asts: Rannikko 5

Sport Palace, Tel Aviv
Attendance: 7,000
Referees: Konstantinos Koromilas (GRE), Chrysanthos Christodoulou (CYP)

23 Feb 2000
19:45

Boxscore

Sweden	61–75	Israel
Scoring by half: 37–30, 24–45
Pts: P. Larsson 18; Rebs: Sahlström 10; Asts: L. Larsson 5		Pts: Turgeman 18; Rebs: Henefeld, Sheffer 6 Asts: Shelef 4

Luleå
Attendance: 1,965
Referees: Romualdas Brazauskas (LTU), Arnis Ozols (LAT)

23 Feb 2000
20:00

Boxscore

Netherlands	85–66	Bulgaria
Scoring by half: 47–32, 38–34
Pts: Nahar 21; Rebs: Hammink 10; Asts: Hammink 7		Pts: H. Dimitrov 19; Rebs: Stoykov 6 Asts: Stoykov 4

Topsportcentrum, Rotterdam
Attendance: 1,500
Referees: Bruno Gasperin (FRA), Richard Stokes (ENG)

23 Feb 2000
20:00

Boxscore

Finland	81–76	Bosnia and Herzegovina
Scoring by half: 36–29, 45–47
Pts: Rannikko 25; Rebs: Pratesi 9 Asts: Rannikko 3		Pts: Firic 24; Rebs: Mujezinovic 7 Asts: Firic 7

Turku
Attendance: 1,200
Referees: Virginijus Dovidavicius (LTU), Aare Halliko (EST)

26 Feb 2000
15:00

Boxscore

Finland	86–83	Netherlands
Scoring by half: 49–45, 37–38
Pts: Luhtanen 29; Rebs: Pehkonen, Matinen 4 Asts: Rannikko 7		Pts: Nahar 22; Rebs: Hammink 8 Asts: Krieger 4

Salo
Referees: Kestutis Pilipauskas (LTU), Grzegorz Ziemblicki (POL)

26 Feb 2000
20:30

Boxscore

Bosnia and Herzegovina	67–52	Sweden
Scoring by half: 29–34, 38–18
Pts: Ovcina 15; Rebs: Ovcina 9 Asts: Firic 5		Pts: P. Larsson 19; Rebs: Sahlström 5 Asts: P. Larsson, L. Larsson, Pettersson Rosendahl 1

Dvorana Luke, Bihac
Attendance: 2,500
Referees: Philippe Leemann (SUI), Murat Biricik (TUR)

26 Feb 2000
21:00

Boxscore

Israel	87–65	Bulgaria
Scoring by half: 46–37, 41–28
Pts: Sheffer 23; Rebs: Lubin 5 Asts: Shelef 7		Pts: Stoykov 22; Rebs: Stoykov 4 Asts: Radionov 4

Sport Palace, Tel Aviv
Attendance: 9,000
Referees: Danko Radic (CRO), Marian Oprea (ROU)

22 Nov 2000
20:00

Boxscore

Netherlands	71–53	Israel
Scoring by quarter: 17–12, 20–15, 16–19, 18–7
Pts: Elson 20; Rebs: Elson 16; Asts: Smits 4		Pts: Sharp 23; Rebs: Green 8 Asts: Shelef 4

Topsportcentrum, Rotterdam
Attendance: 2,200
Referees: Robert Iliffe (ENG), Pascal Dorizon (FRA)

22 Nov 2000
20:15

Boxscore

Finland	88–85	Sweden
Scoring by quarter: 27–15, 25–25, 14–25, 22–20
Pts: Kuisma 22; Rebs: Kumpulainen 9 Asts: Pratesi 5		Pts: P. Larsson 17; Rebs: Sanders, Aulander 7 Asts: L. Larsson 4

Espoo
Attendance: 2,500
Referees: Romualdas Brazauskas (LTU), Juris Kokainis (LAT)

22 Nov 2000
20:30

Boxscore

Bosnia and Herzegovina	83–80	Bulgaria
Scoring by quarter: 26–19, 20–13, 22–20, 15–28
Pts: Markovic Zoric, Hukic 18; Rebs: Ovcina 13; Asts: Ovcina 4		Pts: Minchev 33; Rebs: Natov 9 Asts: Petrov, Radionov 2

Arena of KK Jedinstvo, Tuzla
Attendance: 5,000
Referees: Petr Sudek (SVK), Nikolaos Papadimtriou (GRE)

25 Nov 2000
18:00

Boxscore

Sweden	76–92	Netherlands
Scoring by quarter: 17–25, 28–22, 13–23, 18–22
Pts: Aulander 21; Rebs: Sahlström, Sanders 6 Asts: Bergström 5		Pts: Smits 22; Rebs: Smits 16; Asts: Triemstra, Smits 3

Referees: Leszek Rakoczy (POL), Virginijus Dovidavicius (LTU)

25 Nov 2000
18:00

Boxscore

Bulgaria	106–78	Finland
Scoring by quarter: 31–21, 22–25, 23–15, 30–17
Pts: Minchev 32; Rebs: Natov 10; Asts: Stoykov, Radionov 7		Pts: Kuisma 22; Rebs: Kuisma 6 Asts: Mäkelä 4

Abritus Sports Hall, Razgrad
Referees: Mehmet Keseratar (TUR), Nikolaos Zavlanos (GRE)

26 Nov 2000
20:45

Boxscore

Israel	97–81	Bosnia and Herzegovina
Scoring by quarter: 23–15, 24–18, 23–20, 27–28
Pts: Sharp 17; Rebs: Green 10; Asts: Henefeld, Burstein, Shelef 3		Pts: Leric 22; Rebs: Leric 7 Asts: Mršić 8

Sport Palace, Tel Aviv
Attendance: 7,000
Referees: Bruno Gasperin (FRA), Fabio Facchini (ITA)

29 Nov 2000
19:00

Boxscore

Sweden	101–98	Bulgaria
Scoring by quarter: 31–26, 23–19, 22–26, 25–27
Pts: Sahlström, Aulander 23; Rebs: Sahlström 12; Asts: L. Larsson 9		Pts: Dimitrov 26; Rebs: Natov 7 Asts: Minchev, Petrov, Angelov, Radionov, Stoykov 3

Täby
Referees: Grzegorz Ziemblicki (POL), Fedor Dmitriev (BLR)

29 Nov 2000
20:00

Boxscore

Netherlands	73–56	Bosnia and Herzegovina
Scoring by quarter: 19–16, 17–12, 12–16, 25–12
Pts: Smits 21; Rebs: Smits 12; Asts: Triemstra 4		Pts: Hukic 17; Rebs: Hukic 11; Asts: Hukic 3

Maaspoort, Den Bosch
Attendance: 3,000
Referees: Hermann Latz (GER), Dale Aitcheson (ENG)

29 Nov 2000
10:00

Boxscore

Finland	68–86	Israel
Scoring by quarter: 15–23, 12–26, 15–24, 26–13
Pts: Kuisma 20; Rebs: Pehkonen 9 Asts: Mäkelä 3		Pts: Sharp 21; Rebs: Shelef, Green 5 Asts: Cohen-Mintz 3

Espoo
Attendance: 3,250
Referees: Kestutis Pilipauskas (LTU), Marek Cmikiewicz (POL)

24 Jan 2001
17:30

Boxscore

Bulgaria	99–75	Netherlands
Scoring by quarter: 30–20, 20–19, 24–15, 25–21
Pts: Stoykov 35; Rebs: Natov 11; Asts: Stoykov 9		Pts: Hammink 31; Rebs: Jones 5 Asts: Hammink 3

Abritus Sports Hall, Razgrad
Attendance: 1,000
Referees: Gennaro Colucci (ITA), Srdan Dozai (CRO)

24 Jan 2001
20:30

Boxscore

Bosnia and Herzegovina	102–87	Finland
Scoring by quarter: 29–15, 23–27, 16–11, 34–34
Pts: Hukic 28; Rebs: Hukic 6 Asts: Firic 4		Pts: Mäkelä 24; Rebs: Kuisma 4 Asts: Mäkelä 3

Sarajevo
Attendance: 4,000
Referees: Nikolaos Pitsilkas (GRE), Ladislav Janac (SVK)

24 Jan 2001
20:55

Boxscore

Israel	81–83	Sweden
Scoring by quarter: 20–22, 24–19, 16–20, 21–22
Pts: Sharp 23; Rebs: Saffar 7 Asts: Turgeman 4		Pts: Sanders, Blom 16; Rebs: Blom 12; Asts: L. Larsson, Bergström 3

Arena of Ashkelon, Ashkelon
Attendance: 2,300
Referees: Nikolaos Papadimitriou (GRE), Mehmet Keseratar (TUR)

27 Jan 2001
15:00

Boxscore

Netherlands	81–71	Finland
Scoring by quarter: 19–12, 26–27, 14–20, 22–12
Pts: Hammink 26; Rebs: Triemstra 12; Asts: Triemstra 5		Pts: Kuisma 21; Rebs: Kumpulainen 10; Asts: Mäkelä, Matinen 3

Maaspoort, Den Bosch
Referees: José Araujo (POR), Goran Radonjic (FRA)

27 Jan 2001
16:00

Boxscore

Sweden	79–98	Bosnia and Herzegovina
Scoring by quarter: 15–15, 21–29, 19–25, 24–29
Pts: Stalhandske 17; Rebs: Blom 9 Asts: L. Larsson 7		Pts: Firic 26; Rebs: Ovcina 9 Asts: Firic 6

Malmö
Attendance: 4,050
Referees: Efim Resser (GER), Juris Kokainis (LAT)

27 Jan 2001
17:30

Boxscore

Bulgaria	80–86	Israel
Scoring by quarter: 25–19, 7–25, 20–14, 28–28
Pts: Radionov 17; Rebs: Petrov 7 Asts: Petrov, Stoykov 2		Pts: Sharp, Saffar 24; Rebs: Kozikaro, Lubin 5 Asts: Sharp, Burstein 1

Abritus Sports Hall, Razgrad
Attendance: 1,000
Referees: Petr Sudek (SVK), Christakis Papadamou (CYP)

=== Group D ===
Team	Pld	W	L	PF	PA	PD	Pts	Tie
Slovenia	10	9	1	861	710	+151	19	
Ukraine	10	7	3	782	717	+65	17	
Macedonia	10	6	4	805	750	+55	16	1–1, 1.027
Belgium	10	6	4	788	720	+68	16	1–1, 0.973
Portugal	10	1	9	725	834	−109	11	1–1, 1.105
Iceland	10	1	9	662	894	−232	11	1–1, 0.905

24 Nov 1999
18:30

Boxscore

Slovenia	89–58	Portugal
Scoring by half: 49–26, 40–32
Pts: Jurković, Milic 17; Rebs: Jagodnik, Brezec 5 Asts: Zdovc 6		Pts: Gómez Marques Pinto 20; Rebs: Gómez Marques Pinto 8 Asts: Amorim dos Santos 3

Slovenske Konjice Hall, Slovenske Konjice
Attendance: 1,000
Referees: Peter Poiger (AUT), Jaroslav Janac (SVK)

24 Nov 1999
19:00

Boxscore

Ukraine	66–44	Iceland
Scoring by half: 34–21, 32–23
Pts: Medvedenko 16; Rebs: Iailo 11; Asts: Kharchenko, Iailo 2		Pts: Hardarson 13; Rebs: Stefánsson 6 Asts: Bragason 2

Arena of BC Kyiv, Kyiv
Attendance: 2,500
Referees: Kamen Toshev (BUL), Doru Vinasi (ROU)

24 Nov 1999
19:00

Boxscore

Belgium	69–61	Macedonia
Scoring by half: 32–35, 37–26
Pts: Struelens 16; Rebs: Struelens 10; Asts: Jaumin 4		Pts: Stefanov 34; Rebs: Simik 5 Asts: Stefanov, Kurtovic 1

Schiervelde, Roeselare
Attendance: 2,000
Referees: Bruno Gasperin (FRA), Marco Giansanti (ITA)

27 Nov 1999
16:30

Boxscore

Portugal	62–79	Ukraine
Scoring by half: 26–39, 36–40
Pts: Gómez Marques Pinto 22; Rebs: Gómez Marques Pinto 7 Asts: Amorim dos Santos, Tavares Manarte, Machado Gomes 2		Pts: Iailo 21; Rebs: Lokhmanchuk 9 Asts: Lokhmanchuk 4

Mafra
Attendance: 2,500
Referees: Tiziano Zancanella (ITA), Bruno Vauthier (FRA)

27 Nov 1999
18:00

Boxscore

Iceland	55–80	Belgium
Scoring by half: 30–41, 25–39
Pts: Arnarson 10; Rebs: Stefánsson 6 Asts: Hardarson 7		Pts: Loridon 18; Rebs: Goethals 7 Asts: Jaumin 8

Laugardalshöll, Reykjavík
Referees: Richard Stokes (ENG), Lahdo Sharro (SWE)

27 Nov 1999
20:00

Boxscore

Macedonia	64–70	Slovenia
Scoring by half: 21–28, 43–42
Pts: Bocevski 10; Rebs: Chekovski 7 Asts: Naumoski 3		Pts: Jurković 14; Rebs: Jurković 11; Asts: Milic 5

Skopje
Attendance: 1,500
Referees: Danko Radic (CRO), Vladimir Atanasov (BUL)

1 Dec 1999
19:00

Boxscore

Belgium	51–64	Ukraine
Scoring by half: 21–35, 30–29
Pts: Jaumin 14; Rebs: Goethals 11; Asts: Jaumin, Dupont 2		Pts: Iailo 15; Rebs: Lokhmanchuk 12; Asts: Bazelevskyy, Iailo, Kharchenko, Medvedenko 1

Schiervelde, Roeselare
Attendance: 2,200
Referees: Hermann Latz (GER), Michel Zegwaard (NED)

1 Dec 1999
20:00

Boxscore

Macedonia	72–63	Portugal
Scoring by half: 39–42, 33–21
Pts: Stefanov 27; Rebs: Bocevski 9 Asts: Stefanov 5		Pts: A. Selores Ramos 22; Rebs: Gómez Marques Pinto 8 Asts: Azevedo de Seixas, Gómez Marques Pinto 2

Skopje
Attendance: 1,300
Referees: Andreas Roth (AUT), Recep Ankarali (TUR)

1 Dec 1999
20:00

Boxscore

Slovenia	93–60	Iceland
Scoring by half: 47–35, 46–25
Pts: Becirovic 23; Rebs: Kraljević 12; Asts: Becirovic 4		Pts: Hardarson 16; Rebs: Stefánsson 10; Asts: Arnarson, Hardarson, Olafsson, Ormsson 2

Radovljica
Attendance: 1,200
Referees: Zdeněk Šedivý (CZE), György Varadi (HUN)

23 Feb 2000
18:00

Boxscore

Portugal	77–84	Belgium
Scoring by half: 39–48, 38–36
Pts: Azevedo de Seixas 16; Rebs: Gómez Marques Pinto 9 Asts: Gómez Marques Pinto 4		Pts: Jaumin, Goethals 26; Rebs: Goethals 12; Asts: Jaumin, Goethals 3

Fundao
Attendance: 2,000
Referees: Mateo Ramos (ESP), Gilles Bretagne (FRA)

23 Feb 2000
19:00

Boxscore

Ukraine	63–76	Slovenia
Scoring by half: 33–45, 30–31
Pts: Lokhmanchuk 17; Rebs: Lokhmanchuk 7 Asts: Kharchenko 3		Pts: Jurković 18; Rebs: Jagodnik 11; Asts: Milič 3

Dnipropetrovsk
Attendance: 5,500
Referees: Ivan Zachara (CZE), Ladislav Janáč (SVK)

23 Feb 2000
20:00

Boxscore

Macedonia	94–65	Iceland
Scoring by half: 46–34, 48–31
Pts: Naumoski 21; Rebs: Mihajlovski, Gechevski, Bocevski 7 Asts: Stefanov 4		Pts: Örlygsson 18; Rebs: Gudfinnsson 5 Asts: Hardarson 3

Skopje
Attendance: 1,500
Referees: Memduh Öget (TUR), Stelian Banica (ROU)

26 Feb 2000
16:00

Boxscore

Iceland	68–87	Portugal
Scoring by half: 41–41, 27–46
Pts: Gudfinnsson 18; Rebs: Bragason, Olafsson 7 Asts: Hardarson 3		Pts: A. Selores Ramos 32; Rebs: Gómez Marques Pinto 9 Asts: Dias da Silva, Gómez Marques Pinto 3

Laugardalshöll, Reykjavík
Referees: Lars Klaar (SWE), Paul Den Hartog (NED)

26 Feb 2000
20:00

Boxscore

Slovenia	74–69	Belgium
Scoring by half: 40–40, 34–29
Pts: Smodis 24; Rebs: Jagodnik, Smodis 7 Asts: Smodis 3		Pts: Jaumin 20; Rebs: Struelens 9 Asts: Jaumin 4

Murska Sabota Sports Hall, Murska Sobota
Attendance: 2,000
Referees: Ivo Dolinek (CZE), Fabio Facchini (ITA)

26 Feb 2000
20:00

Boxscore

Macedonia	84–58	Ukraine
Scoring by half: 41–26, 43–32
Pts: Stefanov 26; Rebs: Bocevski 7 Asts: Naumoski 7		Pts: Rayevskyy 18; Rebs: Khryapa 8 Asts: Iailo 2

Skopje
Attendance: 1,500
Referees: Georgiy Valtchev (BUL), Tiziano Zancanella (ITA)

22 Nov 2000
15:00

Boxscore

Portugal	82–104	Slovenia
Scoring by quarter: 18–30, 20–24, 24–28, 20–22
Pts: Oliveira Marçal 33; Rebs: A. Selores Ramos 7 Asts: A. Selores Ramos 3		Pts: Tusek 23; Rebs: Brezec 8 Asts: Zdovc, Milic 5

Lisbon
Attendance: 1,000
Referees: Bruno Gasperin (FRA), Dale Aitcheson (ENG)

22 Nov 2000
18:00

Boxscore

Iceland	62–105	Ukraine
Scoring by quarter: 21–29, 24–16, 7–37, 10–23
Pts: Gudfinnsson 17; Rebs: Stefánsson 11; Asts: Stefánsson 4		Pts: Iailo 22; Rebs: Iailo, Khryapa 13; Asts: Iailo 8

Laugardalshöll, Reykjavík
Referees: Keith Williams (ENG), Björn Braathen (NOR)

22 Nov 2000
19:00

Boxscore

Macedonia	89–77	Belgium
Scoring by quarter: 23–26, 18–14, 27–18, 21–19
Pts: Stefanov 33; Rebs: Bocevski 8 Asts: Stefanov 3		Pts: Ellis 26; Rebs: Struelens 12; Asts: Jaumin, Ellis 3

Skopje
Attendance: 1,400
Referees: Kamen Toshev (BUL), Luigi Lamonica (ITA)

25 Nov 2000
18:00

Boxscore

Ukraine	89–67	Portugal
Scoring by quarter: 17–27, 23–16, 23–7, 26–17
Pts: Lokhmanchuk 30; Rebs: Lokhmanchuk 17; Asts: Lokhmanchuk, Khryapa 3		Pts: A. Selores Ramos 13; Rebs: A. Selores Ramos 10; Asts: Gómez Marques Pinto 4

Arena of BC Kyiv, Kyiv
Attendance: 1,600
Referees: Kamen Toshev (BUL), Milan Brziak (SVK)

25 Nov 2000
19:00

Boxscore

Slovenia	103–82	Macedonia
Scoring by quarter: 31–19, 24–17, 24–22, 24–24
Pts: Smodis 23; Rebs: Tusek 9 Asts: Becirovic 4		Pts: Gechevski 18; Rebs: Bocevski 5

Bonifika Arena, Koper
Attendance: 4,000
Referees: Dubravko Muhvic (CRO), Dragan Neskovic (SRB)

25 Nov 2000
19:30

Boxscore

Belgium	96–61	Iceland
Scoring by quarter: 13–15, 25–18, 27–15, 31–13
Pts: Jaumin 19; Rebs: Ellis 10; Asts: Stas 6		Pts: Arnarson 14; Rebs: F. Stefánsson, Gunnarsson 5

Schiervelde, Roeselare
Attendance: 1,600
Referees: Gérard Gretsch (LUX), Goran Radonjic (FRA)

29 Nov 2000
18:00

Boxscore

Iceland	80–90	Slovenia
Scoring by quarter: 16–26, 28–16, 23–24, 13–24
Pts: Gunnarsson 29; Rebs: F. Stefánsson, J. Stefansson 8 Asts: F. Stefánsson 6		Pts: Tusek 23; Rebs: Tusek 13; Asts: Becirovic 11

Laugardalshöll, Reykjavík
Referees: Serge De Coster (BEL), Martin Hehir (IRL)

29 Nov 2000
19:00

Boxscore

Portugal	67–71	Macedonia
Scoring by quarter: 13–19, 22–13, 10–20, 22–19
Pts: A. Selores Ramos 21; Rebs: Tavares, Gómez Marques Pinto 6 Asts: Tavares 6		Pts: Naumoski 22; Rebs: Bocevski 9 Asts: Naumoski 6

Vale de Cambra
Attendance: 2,500
Referees: Bruno Vauthier (FRA), Giampaolo Cicoria (ITA)

29 Nov 2000
19:00

Boxscore

Ukraine	92–89	Belgium
Scoring by quarter: 25–21, 23–17, 19–28, 25–23
Pts: Iailo 24; Rebs: Iailo 9 Asts: Pudzyrey 4		Pts: Jaumin 24; Rebs: Struelens, Ellis 8 Asts: Cleymans, Jaumin, Struelens 2

Arena of BC Kyiv, Kyiv
Attendance: 3,000
Referees: Zbigniew Szpilewski (POL), Andreas Roth (AUT)

24 Jan 2001
19:30

Boxscore

Belgium	94–81	Portugal
Scoring by quarter: 22–19, 26–15, 21–25, 25–22
Pts: Ellis 21; Rebs: Dupont, Ellis, Baert 6 Asts: Stas 4		Pts: A. Selores Ramos 23; Rebs: A. Selores Ramos 8 Asts: Tavares 3

Schiervelde, Roeselare
Referees: Bruno Vauthier (FRA), Dale Aitcheson (ENG)

24 Jan 2001
20:00

Boxscore

Iceland	83–102	Macedonia
Scoring by quarter: 19–25, 23–28, 20–26, 21–23
Pts: Stefánsson 19; Rebs: Stefánsson 8 Asts: Stefánsson 7		Pts: Stefanov, Gechevski 18; Rebs: Chekovski 6 Asts: Naumoski 10

Laugardalshöll, Reykjavík
Referees: Robert Iliffe (ENG), Fernand Hengel (LUX)

24 Jan 2001
20:10

Boxscore

Slovenia	96–73	Ukraine
Scoring by quarter: 20–17, 23–14, 27–24, 26–18
Pts: Becirovic 19; Rebs: Jagodnik, Modric 7 Asts: Tusek, Udrih 2		Pts: Iailo, Ievstratenko 15; Rebs: Okunskyy 6 Asts: Pudzyrey, Iailo, Kharchenko, Khryapa, Khizhnyak 1

Velenje
Attendance: 3,000
Referees: Paolo Taurino (ITA), Marek Cmikiewicz (POL)

27 Jan 2001
16:30

Boxscore

Portugal	81–84	Iceland
Scoring by quarter: 14–24, 21–13, 23–32, 23–15
Pts: Oliveira Marçal 36; Rebs: Oliveira Marçal 11; Asts: Tavares Manarte, Gouveia Simão 3		Pts: Arnarson 27; Rebs: Stefánsson 6 Asts: Arnarson 4

Pacos de Ferreira
Attendance: 1,500
Referees: Luigi Lamonica (ITA), Nicolas Maestre (FRA)

27 Jan 2001
17:00

Boxscore

Ukraine	95–86	Macedonia
Scoring by quarter: 22–13, 25–23, 23–29, 25–21
Pts: Iailo 31; Rebs: Lokhmanchuk 9 Asts: Iailo 5		Pts: Naumoski 24; Rebs: Bocevski 6 Asts: Blazevski 3

Arena of BC Kyiv, Kyiv
Attendance: 5,500
Referees: Memduh Öget (TUR), Nikolaos Pitsilkas (GRE)

27 Jan 2001
19:30

Boxscore

Belgium	79–66	Slovenia
Scoring by quarter: 18–17, 20–10, 17–21, 24–18
Pts: Ellis 24; Rebs: Dupont 11; Asts: Ellis 4		Pts: Becirovic 20; Rebs: Jagodnik 7 Asts: Jurak 2

Schiervelde, Roeselare
Attendance: 1,400
Referees: Eduardo Sancha (ESP), Gilles Bretagne (FRA)
