= Sérgio Ramos (basketball) =

Portuguese basketball player (born 1975)

Personal information
- Born: 11 December 1975 (age 50) Lisbon, Portugal
- Listed height: 6 ft 6.66 in (2.00 m)
- Listed weight: 225 lb (102 kg)

Career information
- Playing career: 1995–2012
- Position: Small forward

Career history
- 1995–1999: Benfica
- 1999–2000: Olimpia Milano
- 2000–2001: Avellino
- 2001–2005: Lleida
- 2005–2006: Fuenlabrada
- 2006–2007: Alcúdia
- 2007–2008: Bàsquet Mallorca
- 2008–2012: Benfica

Sérgio Bruno Antunes Selores Ramos (born 11 December 1975 in Lisbon) is a Portuguese basketball coach and former player.

He measures 2.00 metres and played as a forward. He announced the end of his international career, after Portugal's exit from the EuroBasket 2007. He retired in 2012 and started to coach Benfica Under 18 team.

Nowadays he is the head coach of Os Belenenses Senior on the Proliga League.

== Early Career ==
He played mostly for Benfica in Portugal - after being league champion with Estrelas da Avenida. He became a professional player right after the ending of the Golden Era of the basketball team of Benfica. He won three trophies as young player, before leaving his club to go play abroad, in the Serie A, for Adecco Milano.

== Career abroad ==
At the age of 24, Sérgio left his country and went to Adecco Milano to play in the Serie A. For the next season, he tried his luck in another Italian team, De Vizia Avellino, where he improved his game quality. After that season, he went to Spain, to play in the Liga ACB. He stayed 4 years in the ACB with CE Lleida Bàsquet, team with which he reached the play-off for the title and also played in European competitions during its best moments. With stats of 11 points, 4 rebounds and nearly 2 assists per game but also large percentages to shoot and a special defense and an intangible sense of community, many sacrifices and desire to win, converted him in a very brave player and also " a basketball star. Previously, he offered the same in Italy as in his homeland where he was an international absolute.

In 2006/07, he arrives at Palma Aqua Alcudia, after a bad year because of frequent injuries which have decreased its rating.

In 2007, after the 9th place in the EuroBasket in Madrid, he put an end to his career with the national team.

At age 33, after 9 years away from his country he returned to the club of his heart: Benfica.

In 2016 he went from Benfica to Os Beleneses where he is the head coach of the senior team.

== Return to Portugal ==
For the 2008/09 season he signed once again with Benfica to be the team leader with only one objective: win the championship once again, what was accomplished. As one of the most talented and experienced players of the team, he is the team captain and considered an example by his teammates and the supporters.

== Titles ==
=== Club ===
- 1995/96: Benfica - Portuguese Basketball Cup, Portuguese Basketball SuperCup
- 1997/98: Benfica - Portuguese Basketball SuperCup
- 2002/03: Caprabo Lleida - Lliga Catalana ACB
- 2003/04: Caprabo Lleida - Lliga Catalana ACB
- 2008/09: Benfica - Portuguese Basketball League, Portuguese Basketball SuperCup
- 2009/10: Benfica - Portuguese Basketball League, Portuguese Basketball SuperCup, Compal SuperCup
- 2011/12: Benfica - Portuguese Basketball League
