= Neno Ašćerić =

Serbian-Austrian basketball player and coach

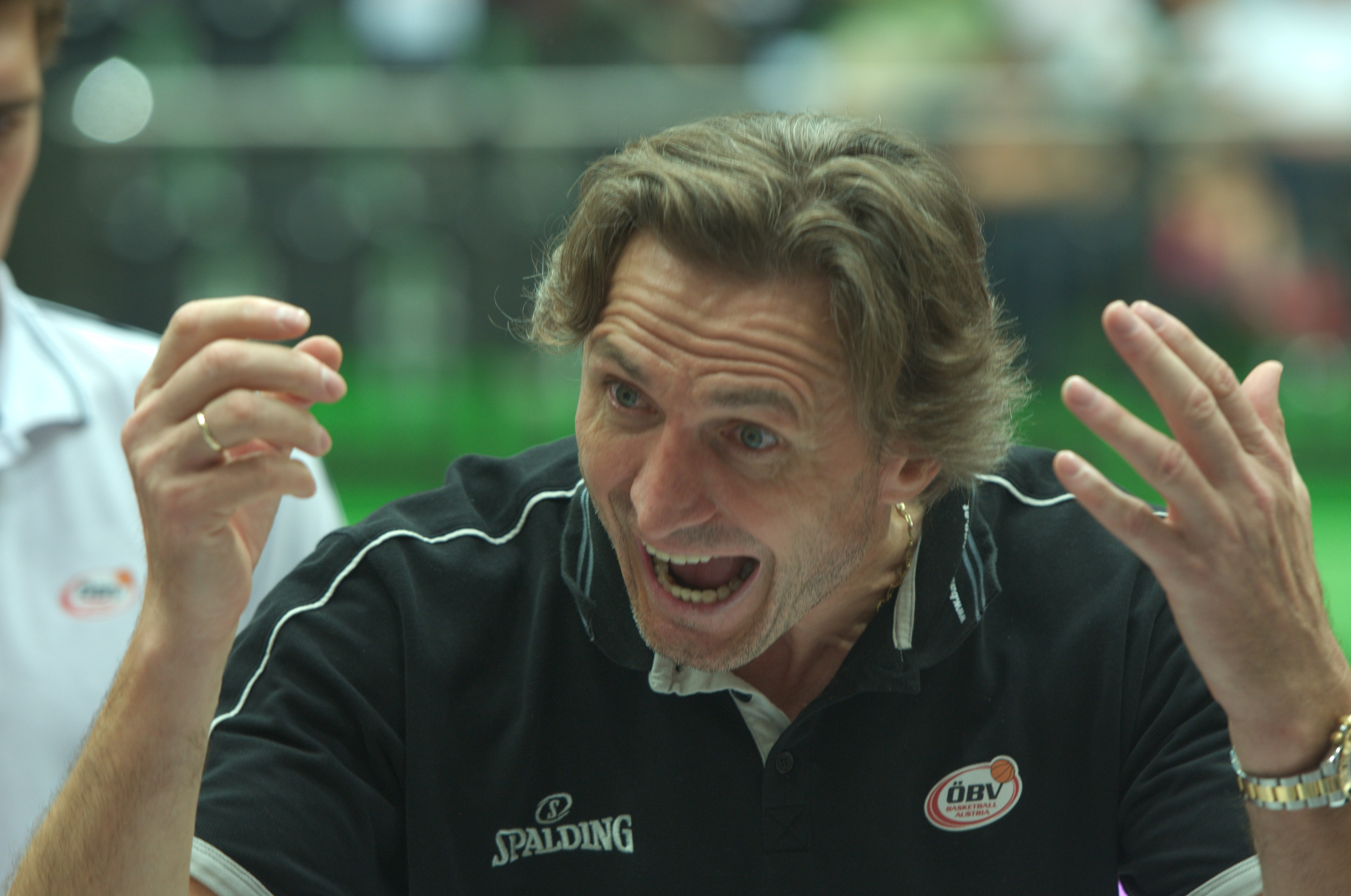
- Neno Ašćerić, coach of the Austrian national basketball team

ALM Évreux
- Title: Head coach
- League: LNB Pro B

Personal information
- Born: 29 August 1965 (age 61) Šašinci, SR Serbia, SFR Yugoslavia
- Listed height: 1.99 m (6 ft 6 in)

Career information
- NBA draft: 1987: undrafted
- Playing career: 1983–2006
- Position: Small forward
- Number: 5
- Coaching career: 2006–present

Career history

Playing
- 1983–1985: Sloboda Šašinci
- 1985–1987: Srem Sremska Mitrovica
- 1987–1988: Bačka Palanka
- 1988–1989: Novi Sad
- 1989–1998: UKJ SUBA Sankt Pölten
- 1998–2000: PSG Racing
- 2000: Crvena zvezda
- 2000–2003: Le Mans Sarthe
- 2003–2004: Hyères-Toulon
- 2005–2006: JA Vichy
- 2006: UBC Sankt Pölten

Coaching
- 2006–2007: UBC Sankt Pölten (assistant)
- 2007: Bourg Basket
- 2007–2008: Saint-Quentin
- 2008–2013: Austria
- 2008–2009: Lechugueros de León
- 2010–2012: Oberwart Gunners
- 2012: Oettinger Rockets
- 2012–2013: Szolnoki Olaj
- 2014: Zepter Vienna
- 2015–2017: Lille Métropole
- 2017–2020: Hermine Nantes
- 2020–present: ALM Évreux

Career highlights
- As a player: 5× Austrian Bundesliga champion (1993, 1995–1998); 3× Austrian Cup winner (1994, 1996, 1998); As a coach: Austrian Bundesliga champion (2011)

Nedeljko "Neno" Ašćerić (Serbian Cyrillic: Недељко "Нено" Ашћерић; born 29 August 1965) is a Serbian–Austrian professional basketball coach and former player. He currently serves as a head coach for ALM Évreux of the French Pro B League.

== Playing career ==
Ašćerić began his career in Yugoslavia, where he worked for several clubs from the second division from 1985–1989. In 1989 he moved to the UKJ SUBA Sankt Pölten of the Austrian Bundesliga. There he spent his most successful time of his playing career. Between 1993 and 1998, he won five National Championship titles and three National Cups. In 1997, he was honored as the Bundesliga Player of the Year.

In 1998, Ašćerić moved to PSG Racing in France. In the following years he played and Crvena zvezda of the YUBA League for several French clubs (Le Mans Sarthe, Hyères-Toulon and JA Vichy). At the age of 41, Ašćerić ended his career as a player at UBC Sankt Pölten in the fall of 2006 following a brief interlude as a playing assistant coach.

Ašćerić represented Austrian national basketball team internationally.

== Coaching career ==
After the end of his playing career Ašćerić coached the Bourg Basket of French league LNB Pro A and the Saint-Quentin of the Pro B. In December 2008, he took over the Mexican club Lechugueros de León, where he won 16 of 22 games and led the team into the playoffs.

In 2008, he became a head coach of the Austrian national basketball team. In February 2010, he also took over the post of head coach of the Austrian Bundesliga club Oberwart Gunners, with whom he won the Austrian champions in the 2010–11 season and celebrated his first title as a coach. Despite an ongoing contract, he resigned from his post in Oberwart after drop out in the Play–off quarterfinals during the 2011–12 season.

At the end of November 2012, Ašćerić became the new head coach of the Oettinger Rockets in the German ProA (2nd tier). He took over the team in 14th place after the previous head coach Marko Simić resigned from office, but remained barely a week before he asked again for dissolution of the contract. In December 2012, he then signed a contract with Hungarian team Szolnoki Olaj, who also played in the Adriatic League. In January 2013, Ašćerić was replaced by Werner Sallomon as a head coach of the Austrian national team. After a moderate start to the 2013–14 season in the Hungarian Championship and in the Adriatic League Ašćerić ended his contract in Hungary after almost exactly a year in December 2013. At the beginning of February 2014, he succeeded Darko Russo and become a head coach of the Austrian defending champion Zepter Vienna.

In January 2015, he became a head coach of the French ProB team Lille Métropole. He remained in office until the end of the 2016–17 season and then moved within the league to the Hermine Nantes.

== Career achievements ==
Player

- Austrian Bundesliga champion: 5 (with UKJ SUBA Sankt Pölten: 1992–93, 1994–95, 1995–96, 1996–97, 1997–98)
- Austrian Cup winner: 3 (with UKJ SUBA Sankt Pölten: 1994, 1995–96, 1997–98)

Coach

- Austrian Bundesliga champion: 1 (with Oberwart Gunners: 2010–11)

Individual

- Bundesliga Player of the Year (1997)
- ÖBL Coach of the Year (2011)

== Personal life ==
His son Luka (born 1997) is a professional basketball player. He coached Luka during his stings with Lille Métropole and Hyères-Toulon.
