= Alexander Lokhmanchuk =

Ukrainian basketball player

Personal information
- Born: May 28, 1973 (age 53) Kerch, Ukrainian SSR, Soviet Union
- Listed height: 6 ft 10.25 in (2.09 m)
- Listed weight: 223 lb (101 kg)

Career information
- Playing career: 1990–2007
- Position: Power forward

Career history
- 1990–1992: BC Budivelnyk
- 1992–1994: Kharkiv
- 1994–1997: BC Budivelnyk
- 1997–1998: Pallacanestro Varese
- 1998: Oyak Renault
- 1999: Fenerbahçe
- 1999–2000: Aurora Basket Jesi
- 2000–2001: Bayer Leverkusen
- 2001–2002: Opel Skyliners
- 2002–2003: SLUC Nancy
- 2003–2004: Azovmash Mariupol
- 2004–2005: BC Kyiv
- 2005–2006: Walter Tigers Tübingen
- 2006–2007: BC Budivelnyk

Alexander Lokhmanchuk (Ukrainian: Александр Лохманчук; born 28 May 1973 in Kerch, Ukrainian SSR, Soviet Union) is a former professional basketball player of Ukraine men's national basketball team. The forward is 2.09 m tall.

== International career ==
Lokhmanchuk was a regular Ukraine national basketball team player.
