= Stuart Robbins =

Welsh basketball player (1976–2010)

Personal information
- Born: 2 November 1976
- Died: 12 April 2010 (aged 33)
- Listed height: 6 ft 11 in (2.11 m)

Career information
- High school: King's Academy
- College: Saint Joseph's University
- Position: Centre

Career history
- ?: Saint Joseph's Hawks
- ?: Thames Valley Tigers
- ?: London Towers
- ?: Bree BBC
- ?: Kaiserslautern
- basketball: FC Bayern Munich
- ?: UL Eagles

Stuart Robbins (2 November 1976 – 12 April 2010) was a Welsh basketball player from Neath in South Wales, who played at centre for the London Towers and Thames Valley in the British Basketball League and professionally in Germany, Belgium and in Limerick, Ireland. He had also played college basketball at Saint Joseph's University in Pennsylvania, United States. In Limerick, he served as assistant coach as well as centre for the city's Superleague team UL Eagles. UL Eagles point guard Matt Hall, also Welsh, was a close friend.

== Death ==
Stuart Robbins died in his sleep at the age of 33; he was found dead in his hotel room in Galway on 12 April 2010. He had just completed his debut season with UL Eagles, where he led his team in scoring and rebounding and was considered one of the outstanding players of that season.
