= 2019–20 Swiss Basketball League =

Swiss Basketball League
- Teams: 12

The 2019–20 Swiss Basketball League (SBL) season was the 89th season of the top tier basketball league in Switzerland. On 13 March 2020, the season was ended prematurely due to the COVID-19 pandemic and no champion was declared.

== Competition format ==
All teams would play two times against each other for completing 22 games per team.

The six first qualified teams would join the group for places 1 to 6 while the other six teams would play the group for places 7 to 12. These two groups would be played with a one-legged round-robin format, where all teams from group 1 to 6 and the two first qualified teams from the group for the seventh position would be qualified for the playoffs. In this intermediate stage, teams start with the points accumulated by the winnings achieved in the first stage.

The quarterfinals and the semifinals would be played as a best-of-five series while the final in a best-of-seven series.

However, due to the COVID-19 pandemic, the league ended with two rounds of the regular season without being played.

== Teams ==
Clubs of the 2019–20 SBL season

The league was composed by 12 teams after Nyon, champion of the second tier, joined the league.

Team	Location
Boncourt	Boncourt
Fribourg Olympic	Fribourg
Lions de Genève	Le Grand-Saconnex/Geneva
Lugano Tigers	Lugano
Monthey-Chablais	Monthey
Nyon	Nyon
Pully Lausanne Foxes	Pully
Riviera Lakers	Vevey
Spinelli Massagno	Cadempino/Massagno
Starwings	Birsfelden/Basel
Swiss Central Basket	Lucerne
Union Neuchâtel	Neuchâtel

== Regular season ==
=== League table ===
Pos	Team	Pld	W	L	PF	PA	PD	Pts	Qualification
1	Fribourg Olympic	20	19	1	1806	1384	+422	39	Qualification for Champions League qualifying round
2	Union Neuchâtel	20	18	2	1639	1401	+238	38	
3	Lions de Genève	20	16	4	1705	1399	+306	36	
4	Spinelli Massagno	20	14	6	1781	1622	+159	34	
5	Monthey-Chablais	20	11	9	1530	1469	+61	31	
6	Riviera Lakers	20	8	12	1529	1571	−42	28	
7	Boncourt	20	8	12	1663	1757	−94	28	
8	Lugano Tigers	20	6	14	1559	1645	−86	26	
9	Starwings	20	6	14	1423	1618	−195	26	
10	Nyon	20	6	14	1471	1683	−212	26	
11	Pully Lausanne Foxes	20	6	14	1470	1679	−209	26	
12	Swiss Central	20	2	18	1513	1861	−348	22	

Updated to match(es) played on 1 March 2020. Source: Swiss Basketball

=== Results ===
Home \ Away	BON	FRI	GEN	LUG	MON	NYO	PUL	RIV	MAS	BAS	SWC	NEU
Boncourt	—	71–87	73–96		63–79	96–90	116–99	80–77	94–92	94–80	114–76	76–78
Fribourg Olympic	110–75	—	83–78	88–77	88–71	105–55		90–64	71–79	111–66	100–51	
Lions de Genève	100–55	73–76	—	77–61	76–68	91–64	98–70	86–71	87–84	89–47	110–66	75–76
Lugano Tigers	89–80	71–82	83–90	—	68–60	76–74	84–64	89–92	82–85		90–83	82–87
Monthey-Chablais	86–78	72–84	77–65	93–68	—	78–83			77–80	86–71	80–49	69–70
Nyon		71–107	72–96	64–81	61–76	—	75–72	62–84	81–89	74–70	85–82	69–86
Pully Lausanne Foxes	84–74	64–91	62–74	76–68	66–78		—	63–57	88–119	65–73	74–70	72–102
Riviera Lakers	82–74	69–79		86–78	70–77	69–73	86–79	—	81–70		97–80	68–80
Spinelli Massagno	99–88		84–90	81–61	93–76	109–99	83–60	98–71	—	91–77	79–77	71–87
Starwings	71–82	49–104	59–78	91–84	74–77	80–71	85–90	73–63		—	84–60	62–68
Swiss Central	92–106	79–95		107–102	89–95	68–86	76–80	103–93	83–109	66–74	—	73–104
Union Neuchâtel	90–74	64–69	68–76	85–65	73–55	69–62	84–57	83–74	92–86		94–66	—

Updated to match(es) played on 1 March 2020. Source: Swiss Basketball
Legend: Blue = home team win; Red = away team win.

== Swiss clubs in European competitions ==
Team	Competition	Progress
Fribourg Olympic	Champions League	Second qualifying round
Fribourg Olympic	FIBA Europe Cup	Regular season
