= 2017–18 Swiss Basketball League =

Swiss Basketball League
- Duration: October 2017 – 9 June 2018
- Teams: 12

Finals
- Champions: Fribourg Olympic (17th title)
- Runners-up: Lions de Genève
- Semifinalists: Lugano Tigers; SAM Massagno

The 2017–18 Swiss Basketball League (SBL) season was the 87th season of the top tier basketball league in Switzerland.

== Competition format ==
All teams will play two times against each other for completing 22 games per team.

The six first qualified teams will join the group for places 1 to 6 while the other six teams will play the group for places 7 to 12. These two groups will be played with a one-legged round-robin format, where all teams from group 1 to 6 and the two first qualified teams from the group for the seventh position will be qualified for the playoffs. In this intermediate stage, teams start with the points accumulated by the winnings achieved in the first stage.

The quarterfinals and the semifinals will be played as a best-of-five series while the final in a best-of-seven series.

== Teams ==
Clubs of the 2017–18 SBL season

BBC Lausanne did not continue playing in the SBL and was replaced by Pully and Vevey Riviera.

Team	Location
SAM Basket Massagno	Massagno
Boncourt	Boncourt
Fribourg Olympic	Fribourg
Lions de Genève	Geneva
Lugano Tigers	Lugano
Monthey	Monthey
Pully	Pully
Starwings Regio Basel	Basel
Swiss Central Basket	Lucerne
Union Neuchâtel	Neuchâtel
Vevey Riviera	Vevey
Winterthur	Winterthur

== Regular season ==
Pos	Team	Pld	W	L	PF	PA	PD	Pts	Qualification
1	Fribourg Olympic	22	20	2	1904	1528	+376	40	Qualification to group 1–6
2	Lions de Genève	22	19	3	1854	1589	+265	38	Qualification to group 1–6
3	Lugano Tigers	22	18	4	1959	1651	+308	36	Qualification to group 1–6
4	Union Neuchâtel	22	13	9	1786	1647	+139	26	Qualification to group 1–6
5	SAM Basket Massagno	22	13	9	1566	1468	+98	26	Qualification to group 1–6
6	Boncourt Red Team	22	11	11	1793	1803	−10	22	Qualification to group 1–6
7	Monthey	22	10	12	1623	1577	+46	20	Qualification to group 7–12
8	Pully Lausanne Foxes	22	9	13	1714	1795	−81	18	Qualification to group 7–12
9	Starwings Regio Basel	22	7	15	1648	1836	−188	14	Qualification to group 7–12
10	Swiss Central	22	7	15	1591	1814	−223	14	Qualification to group 7–12
11	Riviera Lakers	22	3	19	1397	1691	−294	6	Qualification to group 7–12
12	Winterthur	22	2	20	1517	1953	−436	4	Qualification to group 7–12

Source: Swiss Basketball

== Second stage ==
=== Group 1–6 ===
Pos	Team	Pld	W	L	PF	PA	PD	Pts	Qualification
1	Fribourg Olympic	5	5	0	428	367	+61	50	Qualification to playoffs
2	Lions de Genève	5	3	2	373	358	+15	44	Qualification to playoffs
3	Lugano Tigers	5	3	2	396	392	+4	42	Qualification to playoffs
4	SAM Basket Massagno	5	2	3	400	404	−4	30	Qualification to playoffs
5	Union Neuchâtel	5	1	4	398	412	−14	28	Qualification to playoffs
6	Boncourt Red Team	5	1	4	414	476	−62	24	Qualification to playoffs

Source: Swiss Basketball

=== Group 7–12 ===
Pos	Team	Pld	W	L	PF	PA	PD	Pts	Qualification or relegation
1	Monthey	5	4	1	359	297	+62	26	Qualification to playoffs
2	Pully Lausanne Foxes	5	3	2	413	384	+29	24	Qualification to playoffs
3	Starwings Regio Basel	5	3	2	419	424	−5	20	
4	Swiss Central	5	2	3	372	442	−70	18	
5	Riviera Lakers	5	3	2	359	329	+30	12	
6	Winterthur	5	0	5	391	437	−46	4	Relegated to NLB

Source: Swiss Basketball

== Play-offs ==
Seeded teams played at home games 1, 2, 5 and, in the finals, 7.

Quarter-finals
Fribourg Olympic	88	86	74
Pully Lausanne Foxes	86	48	66
SAM Basket Massagno	70	81	67	66
Union Neuchâtel	78	68	91	81
Lions de Genève	83	85	74
Monthey	63	64	59
Lugano Tigers	103	115	86
Boncourt Red Team	95	67	75

Semi-finals
Fribourg Olympic	83	87	95
SAM Basket Massagno	69	67	64
Lions de Genève	91	79	89	84
Lugano Tigers	74	100	71	76

Final
Fribourg Olympic	78	99	70	85	74
Lions de Genève	66	72	80	63	73
