= 2018–19 Swiss Basketball League =

Swiss Basketball League
- Duration: 29 September 2018 – May 2019
- Teams: 11

Finals
- Champions: Fribourg Olympic; 18th title
- Runners-up: Lions de Genève

The 2018–19 Swiss Basketball League (SBL) season is the 88th season of the top tier basketball league in Switzerland.

Fribourg Olympic defended successfully their league and conquered their 18th league.

== Competition format ==
All teams will play two times against each other for completing 20 games per team.

The six first qualified teams will join the group for places 1 to 6 while the other six teams will play the group for places 7 to 11. These two groups will be played with a one-legged round-robin format, where all teams from group 1 to 6 and the two first qualified teams from the group for the seventh position will be qualified for the playoffs. In this intermediate stage, teams start with the points accumulated by the winnings achieved in the first stage.

The quarterfinals and the semifinals will be played as a best-of-five series while the final in a best-of-seven series.

== Teams ==
Clubs of the 2018–19 SBL season

Winterthur was relegated to the NLB after finishing the previous season in the last position. Monthey-Chablais achieved the licence A in second instance after being firstly rejected.

Team	Location
Boncourt	Boncourt
Fribourg Olympic	Fribourg
Lions de Genève	Geneva
Lugano Tigers	Lugano
Monthey-Chablais	Monthey
Pully Lausanne Foxes	Pully
Riviera Lakers	Vevey
SAM Basket Massagno	Massagno
Starwings	Basel
Swiss Central Basket	Lucerne
Union Neuchâtel	Neuchâtel

== Regular season ==
=== League table ===
Pos	Team	Pld	W	L	PF	PA	PD	Pts	Qualification
1	Lions de Genève	20	17	3	1742	1475	+267	34	Qualification to group 1–6
2	Fribourg Olympic	20	16	4	1738	1468	+270	32	Qualification to group 1–6
3	Union Neuchâtel	20	14	6	1576	1447	+129	28	Qualification to group 1–6
4	SAM Basket Massagno	20	14	6	1551	1468	+83	28	Qualification to group 1–6
5	Monthey-Chablais	20	11	9	1580	1520	+60	22	Qualification to group 1–6
6	Riviera Lakers	20	10	10	1686	1712	−26	20	Qualification to group 1–6
7	Boncourt	20	9	11	1627	1647	−20	18	Qualification to group 7–11
8	Lugano Tigers	20	8	12	1659	1674	−15	16	Qualification to group 7–11
9	Swiss Central	20	4	16	1427	1689	−262	8	Qualification to group 7–11
10	Starwings	20	4	16	1380	1643	−263	8	Qualification to group 7–11
11	Pully Lausanne Foxes	20	3	17	1433	1656	−223	6	Qualification to group 7–11

Source: Swiss Basketball

=== Results ===
Home \ Away	BON	FRI	GEN	LUG	MON	MAS	PUL	RIV	BAS	SWC	NEU
Boncourt	—	71–93	103–107	96–85	82–89	84–76	75–80	83–77	74–62	94–54	99–88
Fribourg Olympic	69–70	—	83–69	86–70	101–78	74–77	81–75	115–64	106–68	100–81	75–56
Lions de Genève	85–78	79–75	—	84–85	78–68	77–80	98–78	97–89	103–52	92–46	77–61
Lugano Tigers	97–88	94–84	80–82	—	66–67	76–89	91–89	96–89	95–73	86–66	95–97
Monthey-Chablais	77–87	76–87	76–100	75–73	—	61–67	80–76	97–85	101–61	76–59	61–68
SAM Basket Massagno	81–64	72–77	80–87	79–77	80–70	—	83–50	98–83	84–74	71–61	60–73
Pully Lausanne Foxes	81–72	58–81	61–91	69–76	68–75	76–84	—	85–93	66–83	79–86	65–99
Riviera Lakers	85–70	82–88	80–95	112–97	80–91	78–61	76–65	—	89–87	105–69	92–90
Starwings	88–80	70–85	71–91	68–64	71–94	68–74	66–81	59–67	—	67–65	56–71
Swiss Central	82–85	76–94	71–72	92–79	55–104	83–88	86–76	92–95	70–65	—	66–83
Union Neuchâtel	91–72	82–84	58–78	89–77	76–64	75–67	81–55	77–65	83–72	78–67	—

Source: Swiss Basketball
Legend: Blue = home team win; Red = away team win.

== Group 1–6 ==
=== League table ===
Pos	Team	Pld	W	L	PF	PA	PD	Pts	Qualification
1	Lions de Genève	20	17	3	1742	1475	+267	34	Qualification to playoffs
2	Fribourg Olympic	20	16	4	1738	1468	+270	32	Qualification to playoffs
3	Union Neuchâtel	20	14	6	1576	1447	+129	28	Qualification to playoffs
4	SAM Basket Massagno	20	14	6	1551	1468	+83	28	Qualification to playoffs
5	Monthey-Chablais	20	11	9	1580	1520	+60	22	Qualification to playoffs
6	Riviera Lakers	20	10	10	1686	1712	−26	20	Qualification to playoffs

Source: Swiss Basketball

=== Results ===
Home \ Away	FRI	GEN	MON	RIV	MAS	NEU
Fribourg Olympic	—	—	102–65	—	124–71	91–47
Lions de Genève	73–85	—	—	—	84–61	86–95
Monthey-Chablais	—	87–98	—	83–89	—	—
Riviera Lakers	97–102	83–95	—	—	—	—
SAM Basket Massagno	—	—	68–90	93–85	—	—
Union Neuchâtel	—	—	78–92	93–95	86–67	—

Source: Swiss Basketball
Legend: Blue = home team win; Red = away team win.

== Group 7–11 ==
=== League table ===
Pos	Team	Pld	W	L	PF	PA	PD	Pts	Qualification
1	Boncourt	20	9	11	1627	1647	−20	18	Qualification to playoffs
2	Lugano Tigers	20	8	12	1659	1674	−15	16	Qualification to playoffs
3	Swiss Central	20	4	16	1427	1689	−262	8	
4	Starwings	20	4	16	1380	1643	−263	8	
5	Pully Lausanne Foxes	20	3	17	1433	1656	−223	6	

Source: Swiss Basketball

=== Results ===
Home \ Away	BON	LUG	PUL	BAS	SWC
Boncourt	—	82–94	—	—	98–60
Lugano Tigers	—	—	—	87–86	94–68
Pully Lausanne Foxes	104–102	66–73	—	—	—
Starwings	80–95	—	85–89	—	—
Swiss Central	—	—	87–79	104–109	—

Source: Swiss Basketball
Legend: Blue = home team win; Red = away team win.

== Playoffs ==
Seeded teams played at home games 1, 2 and 5.

=== Bracket ===
Quarter-finals
Fribourg Olympic	3
Boncourt	0
SAM Basket Massagno	1
Monthey-Chablais	3
Lions de Genève	3
Lugano Tigers	0
Union Neuchâtel	2
Riviera Lakers	3

Semi-finals
Fribourg Olympic	3
Monthey-Chablais	0
Lions de Genève	3
Riviera Lakers	0

Final
Fribourg Olympic	3
Lions de Genève	0

=== Quarter-finals ===
Team 1	Series	Team 2	Game 1	Game 2	Game 3	Game 4	Game 5
Fribourg Olympic	3–0	Boncourt	86–77	97–60	90–67		
Lions de Genève	3–0	Lugano Tigers	85–71	99–81	92–86		
Union Neuchâtel	2–3	Riviera Lakers	87–70	79–82	89–92	84–71	69–86
SAM Basket Massagno	1–3	Monthey-Chablais	81–69	77–85	71–84	67–69	

=== Semi-finals ===
Team 1	Series	Team 2	Game 1	Game 2	Game 3	Game 4	Game 5
Fribourg Olympic	3–0	Monthey-Chablais	89–71	112–67	109–77		
Lions de Genève	3–0	Riviera Lakers	107–80	88–73	94–75		

=== Finals ===
Team 1	Series	Team 2	Game 1	Game 2	Game 3	Game 4	Game 5
Fribourg Olympic	3–0	Lions de Genève	83–72	71–65	79–77		

== Swiss clubs in European competitions ==
Team	Competition	Progress
Fribourg Olympic	Champions League	Regular season
