= 2015–16 Championnat LNA season =

Championnat LNA
- Duration: October 4, 2015 – May 23, 2016
- Teams: 10

Finals
- Champions: Fribourg Olympic (16th title)
- Runners-up: Union Neuchâtel

The 2015–16 Championnat LNA season was the 85th season of the top tier basketball league in Switzerland. The season started on October 4, 2014, and ended on May 23, 2016.

== Competition format ==
All teams played three times against each other for completing 27 games per team. The number of games at home or away are decided by the league table of the previous season. The eight first qualified teams qualified for the playoffs while the two last teams finished the season. There are not any relegations to LNB.

== Regular season ==
Pos	Team	Pld	W	L	PF	PA	PD	Pts	Qualification
1	Fribourg Olympic	27	21	6	2252	1834	+418	48	Qualification to playoffs
2	Lions de Genève	27	21	6	2237	1850	+387	48	Qualification to playoffs
3	Union Neuchâtel	27	21	6	2221	1898	+323	48	Qualification to playoffs
4	Monthey	27	20	7	2162	1882	+280	47	Qualification to playoffs
5	Lugano Tigers	27	17	10	2088	1914	+174	44	Qualification to playoffs
6	5 Stelle Massagno	27	12	15	2083	2247	−164	39	Qualification to playoffs
7	Boncourt Red Team	27	9	18	1937	2088	−151	36	Qualification to playoffs
8	Starwings Regio Basel	27	9	18	1942	2160	−218	36	Qualification to playoffs
9	Swiss Central	27	4	23	1961	2387	−426	31	
10	Winterthur	27	1	26	1729	2352	−623	28	

Source: LNBA.ch

== Playoffs ==
Quarterfinals
1	Fribourg Olympic	3
8	Starwings Regio Basel	0
4	Monthey	2
5	Lugano Tigers	3
2	Lions de Genève	3
7	Boncourt Red Team	1
3	Union Neuchâtel	3
6	5 Stelle Massagno	1

Semifinals
1	Fribourg Olympic	3
5	Lugano Tigers	0
2	Lions de Genève	0
3	Union Neuchâtel	3

Finals
1	Fribourg Olympic	4
3	Union Neuchâtel	2

Source: LNBA.ch
