= 2016–17 Championnat LNA season =

Championnat LNA
- Teams: 11

Regular season
- Promoted: Lausanne

Finals
- Champions: Monthey (3rd title)
- Runners-up: Lions de Genève

The 2016–17 Championnat LNA season was the 86th season of the top tier basketball league in Switzerland. Monthey won its third national championship.

== Competition format ==
All teams played two times against each other for completing 20 games per team.

The six first qualified teams joined the group for places 1 to 6 while the other five teams will play the group for places 7 to 11. These two groups will be played with a one-legged round-robin format, where all teams from group 1 to 6 and the two first qualified teams from the group for the seventh position will be qualified for the playoffs. In this intermediate stage, teams start with the points accumulated by the winnings achieved in the first stage.

The quarterfinals and the semifinals were played as a best-of-five series while the final in a best-of-seven series.

== Teams ==
Clubs of the Championnat LNA 2016–17
- BBC Lausanne
- BC Winterthur
- Boncourt
- Fribourg Olympic
- Lions de Genève
- Lugano Tigers
- Monthey
- 5 Stelle Massagno
- Starwings Basket Regio Basel
- Swiss Central Basket
- Union Neuchâtel

== Regular season ==
Pos	Team	Pld	W	L	PF	PA	PD	Pts	Qualification
1	Fribourg Olympic	20	17	3	1669	1336	+333	34	Qualification to group 1–6
2	Monthey	20	14	6	1602	1480	+122	28	Qualification to group 1–6
3	Lugano Tigers	20	13	7	1493	1397	+96	26	Qualification to group 1–6
4	Union Neuchâtel	20	13	7	1582	1492	+90	26	Qualification to group 1–6
5	Lions de Genève	20	13	7	1600	1474	+126	26	Qualification to group 1–6
6	Starwings Regio Basel	20	9	11	1370	1541	−171	18	Qualification to group 1–6
7	Swiss Central	20	9	11	1403	1452	−49	18	Qualification to group 7–11
8	BBC Lausanne	20	7	13	1527	1563	−36	14	Qualification to group 7–11
9	Boncourt Red Team	20	7	13	1526	1617	−91	14	Qualification to group 7–11
10	5 Stelle Massagno	20	6	14	1559	1654	−95	12	Qualification to group 7–11
11	Winterthur	20	2	18	1426	1751	−325	4	Qualification to group 7–11

Source: LNBA.ch

== Intermediate stage ==
=== Group 1–6 ===
Pos	Team	Pld	W	L	PF	PA	PD	Pts	Qualification
1	Fribourg Olympic	5	4	1	376	335	+41	42	Qualification to playoffs
2	Monthey	5	4	1	378	350	+28	36	Qualification to playoffs
3	Lugano Tigers	5	2	3	346	351	−5	30	Qualification to playoffs
4	Lions de Genève	5	2	3	393	394	−1	30	Qualification to playoffs
5	Union Neuchâtel	5	0	5	341	394	−53	26	Qualification to playoffs
6	Starwings Regio Basel	5	3	2	378	388	−10	24	Qualification to playoffs

Source: LNBA.ch

=== Group 7–11 ===
Pos	Team	Pld	W	L	PF	PA	PD	Pts	Qualification
1	BBC Lausanne	4	4	0	363	288	+75	22	Qualification to playoffs
2	Swiss Central	4	1	3	297	328	−31	20	Qualification to playoffs
3	Boncourt Red Team	4	2	2	350	345	+5	18	
4	5 Stelle Massagno	4	2	2	321	333	−12	16	
5	Winterthur	4	1	3	298	335	−37	6	

Source: LNBA.ch

== Play-offs ==
Seeded teams played at home games 1, 2 and 5.

Quarter-finals
Fribourg Olympic	99	99	70
Swiss Central	44	48	57
Lions de Genève	77	84	77	76
Union Neuchâtel	70	78	78	70
Monthey	70	74	96
Lausanne	64	53	85
Lugano Tigers	73	96	76
Starwings Regio Basel	58	74	67

Semi-finals
Fribourg Olympic	67	88	77	61
Lions de Genève	53	96	79	70
Monthey	90	69	72	77	85
Lugano Tigers	78	81	77	75	74

Final
Lions de Genève	62	83	95	64	56	69
Monthey	67	82	90	78	72	77
