= 2017–18 SBL Cup =

- Season: 2017–18
- Dates: 13 December 2017–28 January 2018
- Games played: 5
- Teams: 6

Finals
- Champions: Fribourg Olympic; 8th title
- Runners-up: Lugano Tigers
- Finals MVP: (Senegal) Babacar Touré

The 2017–18 SBL Cup was the 14th season of the SBL Cup, the league cup competition of the Swiss Basketball League (SBL). The competition was held from 13 December 2017 until 28 January 2018. Fribourg Olympic won its eighth league cup title.

== Bracket ==
Quarter-finals
13 December
Union Neuchâtel	65
SAM Massagno	76
13 December
Lions de Genève	106
Boncourt	70

Semi-finals
27 January
Fribourg Olympic	66
SAM Massagno	65
27 January
Lugano Tigers	77
Lions de Genève	76

Final
28 January
Fribourg Olympic (ot)	93
Lugano Tigers	86

== See also ==
- 2017–18 Swiss Basketball League
