= 2011–12 Championnat LNA season =

- League: Championnat LNA
- Sport: Basketball
- Duration: 1 October 2011 – 28 January 2012

Regular season
- Season champions: Lugano Tigers
- Runners-up: Lions de Genève
- Season MVP: (United States) Mohammed Abukar (Lugano)

Finals

LNA seasons
- ← 2010–11 2012–13 →

The 2011–12 Championnat LNA was the 11th season of the top tier basketball league in Switzerland. The Lugano Tigers won the title for the third time in a row.

== Participants ==
- Starwings Basket Regio Basel
- BC Boncourt Red Team
- Benetton Fribourg Olympic
- Lions de Genève
- Lugano Tigers
- BBC Monthey
- SAM Massagno Basket
- BBC Nyon
- SAV Vacallo Basket
Ligue Nationale de Basketball A 2011–12 – Club Locations

== Regular season ==
	Team	Pts	Pld	W	L	PF	PA	Diff	Qualification
1	Lugano Tigers	20	11	10	1	949	760	+189	Qualified for the Playoffs
2	Les Lions de Geneve	16	10	8	2	805	707	+98	Qualified for the Playoffs
3	BBC Monthey	16	11	8	3	780	709	+71	Qualified for the Playoffs
4	Benetton Fribourg Olympic	14	10	7	3	790	693	+97	Qualified for the Playoffs
5	SAV Vacallo Basket	10	11	6	5	800	754	+46	Qualified for the Playoffs
6	Starwings Basket Regio Basel	8	11	4	7	810	866	-56	Qualified for the Playoffs
7	BC Boncourt Red Team	6	11	3	8	739	872	-133	Qualified for the Playoffs
8	BBC Nyon	4	11	2	9	623	750	-127	Qualified for the Playoffs
9	SAM Massagno Basket	2	12	1	11	797	982	-185	

- SAV Vacallo Basket lost 2 points by withdrawing his game on day 5
