= 2014–15 Championnat LNA season =

Championnat LNA
- Duration: October 4, 2014 – May 23, 2015
- Teams: 8

Finals
- Champions: Lions Genève; 2nd title
- Runners-up: Union Neuchâtel

The 2014–15 Championnat LNA season was the 84th season of the top tier basketball league in Switzerland. The season started on October 4, 2014 and ended on May 23, 2015.

== Regular season ==
=== First stage ===
Pos	Team	W	L	PCT	GP	Qualification or relegation
1	Lugano Tigers	15	6	.714	21	Qualified for second stage
2	Union Neuchatel	15	6	.714	21	Qualified for second stage
3	Lions Genève	15	6	.714	21	Qualified for second stage
4	Fribourg Olympic	14	7	.667	21	Qualified for second stage
5	Starwings	11	10	.524	21	Qualified for second stage
6	BBC Monthey	5	16	.238	21	Qualified for second stage
7	BC Boncourt	5	16	.238	21	
8	SAM Basket Massagno	4	17	.190	21	

=== Second stage ===
Pos	Team	W	L	PCT	GP	Qualification or relegation
1	Lions Genève	8	2	.800	10	Qualified for Playoffs
2	Union Neuchatel	7	3	.700	10	Qualified for Playoffs
3	Lugano Tigers	6	4	.600	10	Qualified for Playoffs
4	Fribourg Olympic	5	5	.500	10	Qualified for Playoffs
5	Starwings	4	6	.400	10	
6	BBC Monthey	0	10	.000	10	

== Playoffs ==
Semifinals
1	Lions Genève	3
4	Fribourg Olympic	0
2	Union Neuchatel	3
3	Lugano Tigers	2

Finals
1	Lions Genève	4
2	Union Neuchatel	1
