= Marko Mlađan =

Swiss-Serbian basketball player

No. 22 – SAM Basket
- Position: Power forward

Personal information
- Born: 26 March 1993 (age 33) Lugano, Switzerland
- Listed height: 2.05 m (6 ft 9 in)

Career information
- NBA draft: 2015: undrafted
- Playing career: 2008–present

Career history
- 2006–2009: BC79 Arbedo
- 2009–2010: SP Star Gordola
- 2010–2012: Lugano Tigers
- 2010–2011: →DDV Lugano
- 2012–2013: SAM Massagno
- 2013–2015: Fribourg Olympic
- 2015–2016: BBC Monthey
- 2016: Union Olimpija
- 2016–2019: Lions de Genève
- 2019–present: SAM Massagno

Career highlights
- 2× Swiss League champion (2011, 2012); 3× Swiss Cup winner (2011, 2012, 2016); 3x SBL Cup winner (2011,2012,2015)

Marko Mlađan (Anglicized: Marko Mladjan, Serbian Cyrillic: Марко Млађан; born 26 March 1993) is a Swiss-Serbian professional basketball player for SAM Basket. He is a 2.05 m (6 ft 9 in) tall forward.

== Professional career ==
On 21 September 2016 he signed a one-year deal with Slovenian club Union Olimpija.

== Personal life ==
His older brother Dušan is also a professional basketball player.
