= 2000–01 FIBA Korać Cup =

- League: FIBA Korać Cup
- Sport: Basketball

Finals
- Champions: (Spain) Unicaja
- Runners-up: (Federal Republic of Yugoslavia) Hemofarm

FIBA Korać Cup seasons
- ← 1999–00 2001–02 →

The 30th edition of the FIBA Korać Cup occurred between September 29, 2000 and April 18, 2001. The competition was won by the Spanish Unicaja, who beat the Yugoslavian Hemofarm in the double finals.

== Team allocation ==
The labels in the parentheses show how each team qualified for the place of its starting round

- 1st, 2nd, etc.: League position after Playoffs
- WC: Wild card

Second qualifying round
(Russia) Lokomotiv Mineralnye Vody (4th)	(Italy) Telit Trieste (7th)	(Turkey) Fenerbahçe (9th)	(Finland) Kouvot (5th)
(Russia) Spartak Saint Petersburg (6th)	(Italy) Montecatini (10th)	(Federal Republic of Yugoslavia) Hemofarm (4th)	(Greece) Near East (9th)
(Russia) Shakthyor Irkutsk (7th)	(Italy) ~~Lineltex Andrea Costa Imola~~ (12th)	(Federal Republic of Yugoslavia) NIS Vojvodina (5th)	(Israel) Maccabi Ironi Ramat Gan (4th)
(Russia) Avtodor Saratov (8th)	(Spain) Canarias Telecom (7th)	(Federal Republic of Yugoslavia) FMP Železnik (6th)	(North Macedonia) MZT Skopje 2000 (3rd)
(Russia) Khimki (9th)	(Spain) Unicaja (8th)	(Austria) SÜBA Sankt Pölten (5th)	(Netherlands) Ricoh Astronauts (1st)
(France) Strasbourg (4th)	(Spain) Cáceres (9th)	(Belgium) Okapi Aalstar (3rd)	(Poland) Hoop Pekaes Pruszków (3rd)
(France) Cholet (5th)	(Spain) Casademont Girona (10th)	(Bulgaria) CSKA Sofia (4th)	(Portugal) Oliveirense (6th)
(France) Le Mans Sarthe (7th)	(Turkey) Darussafaka (6th)	(Croatia) Benston Zagreb (5th)	(Slovenia) Kovinotehna Savinjska Polzela (5th)
(France) JDA Dijon (9th)	(Turkey) Turk Telekom (7th)	(Cyprus) Achileas Kaimakli (3rd)	(Sweden) Södertalje Kings (5th)
(Italy) Viola Reggio Calabria (5th)	(Turkey) Galatasaray (8th)	(Czech Republic) Opava (2nd)	
First qualifying round
(Bosnia and Herzegovina) Sloboda Dita Tuzla (2nd)	(Bulgaria) Yambolgaz-92 (3rd)	Portugal Telecom (3rd)	(Poland) Prokom Trefl (9th)
(Bosnia and Herzegovina) Feal Široki (3rd)	(Cyprus) Apollon Limassol (2nd)	(Portugal) Seixal FC (4th)	(Romania) CSU Pitesti (1st)
(Bosnia and Herzegovina) Brotnjo (4th)	(Cyprus) AEL Limassol (4th)	(Portugal) CAB Madeira (5th)	(Romania) West Petrom Arad (2nd)
(Bosnia and Herzegovina) Igokea (5th)	(Cyprus) Panathinaikos Limassol (5th)	(Switzerland) Fribourg Olympic (3rd)	(Slovenia) Slovan (4th)
(Germany) Herzogtel Trier (5th)	(Hungary) Albacomp Fehérvár (1st)	(Switzerland) Vevey Riviera (4th)	(Slovenia) Triglav Kranj (6th)
(Germany) Mitteldeutscher (6th)	(Hungary) MOL Szolnoki Olaj (2nd)	(Switzerland) Olimpique Lausanne (5th)	(Belarus) Grodno-93 (1st)
(Germany) Avitos Gießen (7th)	(Hungary) Atomerömü (9th)	(Austria) Goldene Seiten Kapfenberg (2nd)	(Croatia) Sava Osiguranje Rijeka (6th)
(Germany) DJK Würzburg (12th)	Racing Club Luxembourg (1st)	(Austria) Stahlbau Oberwart Gunners (3rd)	(Finland) Honka Playboys (3rd)
(Belgium) Telindus Union Mons-Hainaut (5th)	(Luxembourg) Etzella	(Czech Republic) Mlekarna Kunin (4th)	(Georgia (country)) Maccabi Brinkford Tbilisi
(Belgium) Bingoal Bree (6th)	(Luxembourg) AB Contern	(Czech Republic) Sparta Praha (5th)	(San Marino) Pallacanestro Titano
(Belgium) Athlon Ieper (13th)	(North Macedonia) Nikol Fert (1st)	(Netherlands) Landstede Zwolle (4th)	(Sweden) Sundsvall Dragons (4th)
(Bulgaria) Levski Sofia (1st)	(North Macedonia) Rabotnički (2nd)	(Netherlands) MPC Donar (5th)	
(Bulgaria) Cherno More (2nd)	(North Macedonia) Kumanovo (4th)	(Poland) Pogoń Ruda Śląska (6th)	

== First round ==
Team 1	Agg.	Team 2	1st leg	2nd leg
DJK Würzburg (Germany)	161–116	(Czech Republic) Sparta Prague	90–57	71–59
Prokom Trefl (Poland)	151–150	(Germany) Avitos Gießen	77–65	74–85
Racing Club Luxembourg	171–179	(Germany) Herzogtel Trier	93–90	78–89
Mitteldeutscher (Germany)	138–137	(Hungary) Albacomp Fehérvár	65–69	73–68
MOL Szolnoki Olaj (Hungary)	180–163	(Poland) Pogoń Ruda Śląska	110–68	70–95
Triglav Kranj (Slovenia)	140–178	(Hungary) Atomerőmű	75–84	65–94
Slovan (Slovenia)	174–130	(Austria) Goldene Seiten Kapfenberg	89–79	85–51
Stahlbau Oberwart (Austria)	182–169	(Czech Republic) Mlékárna Kunín	88–87	95–82
Maccabi Brinkford Tbilisi (Georgia (country))	134–172	(Belarus) Grodno-93	79–101	55–71
Sundsvall Dragons (Sweden)	40–0	(Finland) Honka Playboys	20–0	20–0
Contern (Luxembourg)	149–212	(Belgium) Bingoal Bree	76–79	73–133
Donar (Netherlands)	142–164	(Belgium) Athlon Ieper	70–88	72–76
Landstede Zwolle (Netherlands)	141–152	(Portugal) CAB Madeira	67–68	74–84
Seixal FC (Portugal)	133–138	(Belgium) Telindus Union Mons-Hainaut	83–70	50–68
Portugal Telecom	184–152	(Switzerland) Vevey Riviera	91–79	93–73
Etzella (Luxembourg)	140–192	(Switzerland) Olympique Lausanne	76–95	64–97
Pallacanestro Titano (San Marino)	166–192	(Switzerland) Fribourg Olympic	80–86	86–106
Apollon Limassol (Cyprus)	40–0	(Bulgaria) Cherno More	20–0	20–0
AEL Limassol (Cyprus)	169–178	(Bulgaria) Levski Sofia	79–84	90–94
Kumanovo (North Macedonia)	158–186	(Bulgaria) Yambolgaz-92	80–82	78–104
Rabotnički (North Macedonia)	133–141	(Bosnia and Herzegovina) Igokea	63–71	70–70
Sloboda Dita (Bosnia and Herzegovina)	142–126	(North Macedonia) Nikol Fert	81–60	61–66
Sava Osiguranje Rijeka (Croatia)	172–150	(Bosnia and Herzegovina) Brotnjo	84–79	88–71
CSU Pitesti (Romania)	130–209	(Bosnia and Herzegovina) Feal Široki	64–91	66–118
West Petrom Arad (Romania)	185–148	(Cyprus) Panathinaikos Limassol	93–65	92–83

== Round of 64 ==
Team 1	Agg.	Team 2	1st leg	2nd leg
DJK Würzburg (Germany)	168–184	(Poland) Hoop Pekaes Pruszków	89–89	79–95
Stahlbau Oberwart (Austria)	55–126	(Poland) Prokom Trefl	55–106	0–20
Strasbourg (France)	171–151	(Germany) Herzogtel Trier	80–66	91–85
Montecatini (Italy)	147–142	(Germany) Mitteldeutscher	72–80	75–62
MOL Szolnoki Olaj (Hungary)	169–155	(Austria) SÜBA Sankt Pölten	82–68	87–87
Atomerőmű (Hungary)	150–160	(Italy) Viola Reggio Calabria	79–73	71–87
Slovan (Slovenia)	162–163	(Italy) Telit Trieste	86–69	76–94
Opava (Czech Republic)	170–150	(Slovenia) Kovinotehna Savinjska Polzela	91–62	79–88
Shakthyor Irkutsk (Russia)	173–116	(Belarus) Grodno-93	97–53	76–63
Khimki (Russia)	167–157	(Sweden) Sundsvall Dragons	86–75	81–82
Lokomotiv Mineralnye Vody (Russia)	161–155	(Sweden) Södertalje Kings	76–54	85–101
Kouvot (Finland)	135–150	(Russia) Spartak Saint Petersburg	72–73	63–77
CSKA Sofia (Bulgaria)	137–201	(Russia) Avtodor Saratov	75–109	62–92
Okapi Aalstar (Belgium)	129–150	(Netherlands) Ricoh Astronauts	67–85	62–65
Athlon Ieper (Belgium)	166–136	(Spain) Casademont Girona	83–70	83–66
Telindus Union Mons-Hainaut (Belgium)	128–192	(Spain) Unicaja	62–95	66–97
Bingoal Bree (Belgium)	171–161	(France) Cholet	77–79	94–82
Le Mans (France)	214–162	(Portugal) CAB Madeira	104–74	110–88
Canarias Telecom (Spain)	141–154	Portugal Telecom	66–72	75–82
Cáceres (Spain)	168–151	(Portugal) Oliveirense	75–67	93–84
Lineltex AC Imola (Italy)	0–40	(Switzerland) Olympique Lausanne	0–20	0–20
Fribourg Olympic (Switzerland)	121–148	(France) jJDA Dijon	73–80	49–68
Achileas Kaimakli (Cyprus)	130–198	(Greece) Near East	70–106	60–92
Hemofarm (Federal Republic of Yugoslavia)	150–120	(Cyprus) Apollon Limassol	75–50	75–70
MZT Skopje 2000 (North Macedonia)	163–174	(Federal Republic of Yugoslavia) NIS Vojvodina	78–81	85–93
Yambolgaz 92 (Bulgaria)	127–142	(Federal Republic of Yugoslavia) FMP Železnik	65–67	62–75
Levski Sofia (Bulgaria)	159–136	(Croatia) Benston Zagreb	90–67	69–69
Sava Osiguranje Rijeka (Croatia)	173–181	(Turkey) Turk Telekom	101–92	62–89
Igokea (Bosnia and Herzegovina)	143–148	(Turkey) Fenerbahçe	78–75	65–73
Sloboda Dita (Bosnia and Herzegovina)	147–145	(Turkey) Galatasaray	70–64	77–81
Darussafaka (Turkey)	169–140	(Bosnia and Herzegovina) Feal Široki	103–62	66–78
West Petrom Arad (Romania)	160–192	(Israel) Maccabi Ironi Ramat Gan	73–100	87–92

Notes

1. Lineltex Imola: Team withdrew to replace Olimpia Milano in 2000–2001 Saporta Cup.

== Round of 32 ==
Key to colors
Top two places in each group advance to round of 32

=== Group A ===
	Team	Pld	Pts	W	L	PF	PA
1	(Poland) Prokom Trefl Sopot	6	9	3	3	478	462
2	(Netherlands) Ricoh Astronauts	6	9	3	3	463	455
3	(Czech Republic) Opava	6	9	3	3	517	512
4	(Poland) Hoop Pekaes Pruszków	6	9	3	3	443	472

=== Group B ===
	Team	Pld	Pts	W	L	PF	PA
1	(Russia) Avtodor Saratov	6	12	6	0	572	503
2	(Russia) Lokomotiv Mineralnye Vody	6	9	3	3	545	570
3	(Russia) Spartak Saint Petersburg	6	8	2	4	531	555
4	(Russia) Shakhtyor Irkutsk	6	7	1	5	506	526

=== Group C ===
	Team	Pld	Pts	W	L	PF	PA
1	(Turkey) Darüşşafaka	6	10	4	2	512	484
2	(Bulgaria) Levski Sofia	6	9	3	3	532	545
3	(Russia) Khimki	6	9	3	3	501	481
4	(Federal Republic of Yugoslavia) FMP Železnik	6	8	2	4	443	478

=== Group D ===
	Team	Pld	Pts	W	L	PF	PA
1	(Turkey) Fenerbahçe	6	11	5	1	475	431
2	(Federal Republic of Yugoslavia) Hemofarm	6	10	4	2	469	435
3	(Turkey) Türk Telekom	6	9	3	3	477	483
4	(Federal Republic of Yugoslavia) NIS Vojvodina	6	6	0	6	460	532

=== Group E ===
	Team	Pld	Pts	W	L	PF	PA
1	(Greece) Near East	6	10	4	2	459	484
2	(Israel) Maccabi Ramat Gan	6	9	3	3	478	456
3	(Bosnia and Herzegovina) Sloboda Dita	6	9	3	3	459	456
4	(Italy) Montecatini	6	8	2	4	519	519

=== Group F ===
	Team	Pld	Pts	W	L	PF	PA
1	(Italy) Viola Reggio Calabria	6	12	6	0	581	474
2	(Italy) Telit Trieste	6	9	3	3	542	482
3	(Hungary) MOL Szolnoki Olajbanyasz	6	8	2	4	528	571
4	(Switzerland) Olympique Lausanne	6	7	1	5	485	609

=== Group G ===
	Team	Pld	Pts	W	L	PF	PA
1	(Spain) Cáceres	6	11	5	1	474	441
2	(France) JDA Dijon	6	10	4	2	461	421
3	Portugal Telecom	6	9	3	3	477	501
4	(Belgium) Bingoal Bree	6	6	0	6	480	529

=== Group H ===
	Team	Pld	Pts	W	L	PF	PA
1	(Spain) Unicaja	6	11	5	1	512	431
2	(Belgium) Athlon Ieper	6	9	3	3	454	500
3	(France) Strasbourg	6	8	2	4	451	454
4	(France) Le Mans	6	8	2	4	489	521

== Playoffs ==
=== Bracket ===
Round of 16
(Netherlands) Ricoh Astronauts	89	73	162
(Russia) Avtodor Saratov	76	75	151
(Bulgaria) Levski Sofia	87	79	166
(Turkey) Fenerbahçe	86	90	176
(Israel) Maccabi Ramat Gan	106	87	193
(Italy) Viola Reggio Calabria	80	98	178
(France) JDA Dijon	68	57	125
(Spain) Unicaja	64	85	149
(Russia) Lokomotiv Mineralnye Vody	78	68	146
(Poland) Prokom Trefl Sopot	71	85	156
(Federal Republic of Yugoslavia) Hemofarm	73	58	131
(Turkey) Darüşşafaka	60	69	129
(Italy) Telit Trieste	85	88	173
(Greece) Near East	74	93	167
(Belgium) Athlon Ieper	83	83	166
(Spain) Cáceres	83	77	160

Quarterfinals
(Netherlands) Ricoh Astronauts	93	69	162
(Turkey) Fenerbahçe	73	79	152
(Israel) Maccabi Ramat Gan	73	70	143
(Spain) Unicaja	74	88	162
(Poland) Prokom Trefl Sopot	59	54	113
(Federal Republic of Yugoslavia) Hemofarm	64	70	134
(Italy) Telit Trieste	86	71	157
(Belgium) Athlon Ieper	74	84	158

Semifinals
(Netherlands) Ricoh Astronauts	46	55	101
(Spain) Unicaja	59	86	145
(Federal Republic of Yugoslavia) Hemofarm	71	64	135
(Belgium) Athlon Ieper	59	60	119

Finals
(Spain) Unicaja	77	71	148
(Federal Republic of Yugoslavia) Hemofarm	47	69	116

=== Round of 16 ===
Team 1	Agg.	Team 2	1st leg	2nd leg
Ricoh Astronauts (Netherlands)	162–151	(Russia) Avtodor Saratov	89–76	73–75
Lokomotiv Mineralnye Vody (Russia)	146–156	(Poland) Prokom Trefl Sopot	78–71	68–85
Levski Sofia (Bulgaria)	166–176	(Turkey) Fenerbahçe	87–86	79–90
Hemofarm (Federal Republic of Yugoslavia)	131–129	(Turkey) Darüşşafaka	73–60	58–69
Maccabi Ramat Gan (Israel)	193–178	(Italy) Viola Reggio Calabria	106–80	87–98
Telit Trieste (Italy)	173–167	(Greece) Near East	85–74	88–93
Dijon (France)	125–149	(Spain) Unicaja	68–64	57–85
Athlon Ieper (Belgium)	166–160	(Spain) Cáceres	83–83	83–77

=== Quarterfinals ===
Team 1	Agg.	Team 2	1st leg	2nd leg
Ricoh Astronauts (Netherlands)	162–152	(Turkey) Fenerbahçe	93–73	69–79
Prokom Trefl Sopot (Poland)	113–134	(Federal Republic of Yugoslavia) Hemofarm	59–64	54–70
Maccabi Ramat Gan (Israel)	143–162	(Spain) Unicaja	73–74	70–88
Telit Trieste (Italy)	157–158	(Belgium) Athlon Ieper	86–74	71–84

=== Semifinals ===
Team 1	Agg.	Team 2	1st leg	2nd leg
Ricoh Astronauts (Netherlands)	101–145	(Spain) Unicaja	46–59	55–86
Hemofarm (Federal Republic of Yugoslavia)	135–119	(Belgium) Athlon Ieper	71–59	64–60

=== Finals ===
Team 1	Agg.	Team 2	1st leg	2nd leg
Unicaja (Spain)	148–116	(Federal Republic of Yugoslavia) Hemofarm	77–47	71–69

== Rosters ==
(Spain) Unicaja Málaga: Carlos Cabezas, Berni Rodriguez (C), Veljko Mrsic, Danya Abrams, Richard Petruska; Moustapha Sonko, Jean-Marc Jaumin, Darren Phillip, Paco Vazquez, Frederic Weis. Coach: Bozidar Maljkovic
(Socialist Federal Republic of Yugoslavia) Hemofarm: Stevan Pekovic, Djordje Djogo, Dragoljub Vidacic (C), Aleksandar Zecevic, Sasha Savic; Marko Ivanovic, Luka Vucinic, Zoran Popovic, Ivan Stefanovic. Coach: Zeljko Lukajic

2000–01 FIBA Korać Cup Champions

Unicaja
1st title

== See also ==
- 2000–01 Euroleague
- 2000–01 FIBA SuproLeague
- 2000–01 FIBA Saporta Cup
