= Babacar Touré (basketball) =

Senegalese basketball player

Personal information
- Born: 14 November 1985 (age 41) Kaolack, Senegal
- Listed height: 6 ft 9 in (2.06 m)
- Listed weight: 190 lb (86 kg)

Career information
- NBA draft: 2007: undrafted
- Playing career: 2007–2019
- Position: Forward / center
- Number: 13

Career history
- 2007–2010: Colas Bernex
- 2010–2013: Lions de Genève
- 2013–2016: Union Neuchâtel
- 2016–2017: Vevey Riviera
- 2017–2019: Fribourg Olympic

Career highlights
- 3× Swiss League champion (2013, 2018, 2019); Swiss League Finals MVP (2018); 2× Swiss League MVP (2015, 2016); Swiss Second League champion (2017); Swiss Second League Finals MVP (2017); Swiss Cup champion (2018); Swiss League Cup champion (2018)

Babacar Touré (born 14 November 1985) is a Senegalese retired basketball player. He played for the Senegal national basketball team and several teams in Switzerland. Touré enjoyed his most successful years with Fribourg Olympic, where he won three Swiss championships and was named the league's Finals MVP two times.

== Professional career ==
Touré played for Sibac Dakar in his home country Senegal and completed an apprenticeship as an accountant, which he continued in Switzerland after moving to the second division team Colas Bernex Basket in November 2007.

Toure moved to the Lions de Genève in 2010–11 season, he averaged 11.2 points, 7.3 rebounds and 0.6 assists per game. In his second season at Lions de Genève, he averaged 12.4 points, 9.7 rebounds and 1.7 assists per game.

In the 2012–13 season, he averaged 11.6 points, 6.8 rebound and 0.7 assists per game. In August 2014, he moved to the Union Neuchâtel Basket, he averaged 16.6 points, 10 rebounds and 1.1 assists per game. In the 2014–15 season, he averaged 18.9 points, 10.9 rebounds and 1.1 assists per game. In the 2015–16 season, he averaged 19 points, 12 rebounds and 1.4 assists per game.

He moved to the second tier Championnat LNB side Vevey Riviera Basket in 2016, where he averaged 20.9 points, 12.3 rebounds and 2.2 assists per game. Toure helped them win the LNB and was named the Finals MVP.

In 2017, he moved to the Fribourg Olympic Basket, where he averaged 19.1 points, 12.1 rebounds and 1.7 assists per game. In the 2018–19 season, he averaged 15.6 points, 9.2 rebounds and 2.1 assists per game. He also played in the Basketball Champions League in 2018–19 season, he averaged 15.7 points, 10.5 rebounds and 3.5 assists per game. He played his last professional match on 30 October 2019, against CSU Sibiu in the FIBA Europe Cup.

In February 2021, Touré announced his retirement from basketball.

== National team career ==
Babacar Toure was called up to the Senegal national basketball team for the AfroBasket 2011 tournament, where he averaged 7.1 points, 5.4 rebounds and 0.6 assists per game at the tournament. He represented the Senegal national basketball team at the 2019 FIBA Basketball World Cup in China, where he averaged 8 points, 2.3 rebounds and 0.3 assists per game.
