= Justin Roberson =

American basketball player (born 1993)

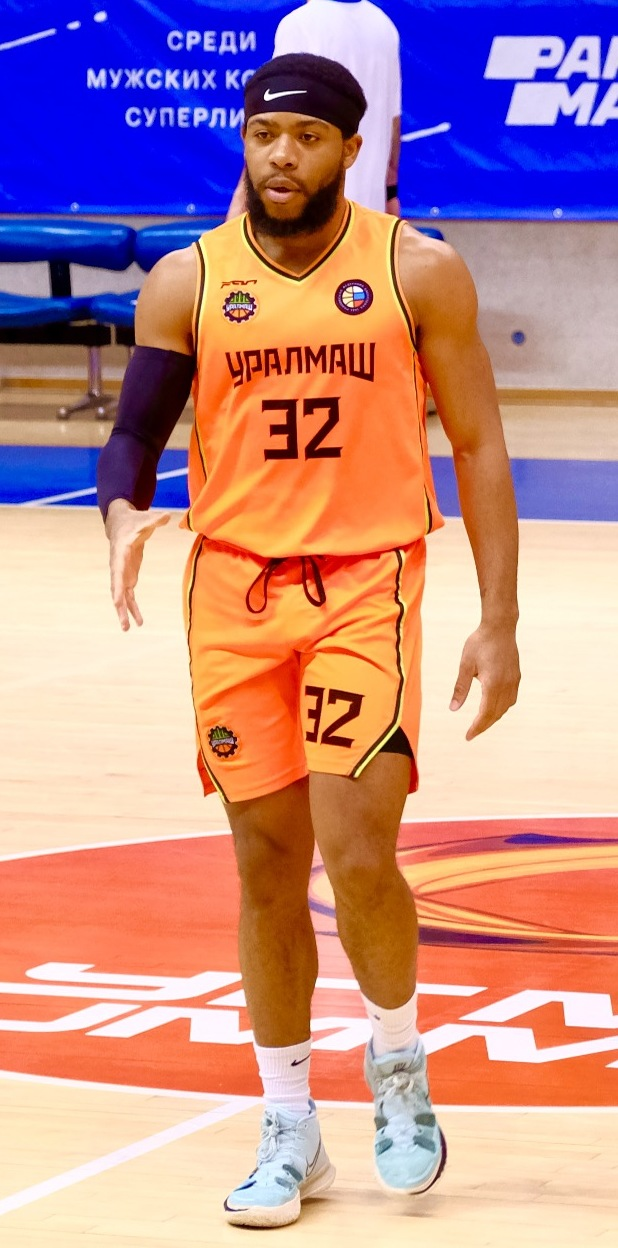

No. 32 – KK Cibona
- Position: Point guard
- League: Croatian League

Personal information
- Born: 8 July 1993 (age 33) Natchitoches Parish, Louisiana US
- Listed height: 6 ft 1 in (1.85 m)
- Listed weight: 189 lb (86 kg)

Career information
- College: University of Louisiana at Monroe (2014–2016)
- NBA draft: 2016: undrafted
- Playing career: 2016–present

Career history
- 2016–2017: Fribourg Olympic Basket
- 2017–2018: SAM Basket Massagno
- 2018–2019: Fribourg Olympic Basket
- 2019–2020: Burevestnik Yaroslavl
- 2020–2022: Uralmash Yekaterinburg
- 2022–2023: Parma
- 2023–2024: Samara
- 2024–2025: Sharjah
- 2025–present: KK Cibona

Career highlights
- Swiss Champion (2018–2019); Croatian League champion (2026); The owner Swiss Cup (2018); UAE Champion (2024–2025); Silver medalist of the 2020–2021 Super League-1; Super League 1 Champion (2021–2022)

Justin Raashard Roberson (born July 8, 1993) is an American professional basketball player for KK Cibona of the Croatian League.

== Professional career ==
In the NCAA, Roberson played for the University of Louisiana at Monroe.

In 2016, Roberson moved to Switzerland, where he played for Fribourg Olympic Basket and SAM Basket Massagno.

In July 2018, he signed a contract with Fribourg Olympic Basket. In the 2018/2019 season, Roberson became the Swiss champion and won the national cup.

On June 13, 2019, Roberson signed a contract with the Russian club Burevestnik. On March 24, 2020, Justin Roberson extended his contract with Burevestnik.

In December 2020, Roberson left Burevestnik and joined Uralmash, with whom he became the silver medalist of the Super League-1.

In May 2021, Roberson signed a new contract with Uralmash. As part of the team, Justin became the champion of the Super League-1 and was recognized as the MVP of the tournament.

In June 2022, Roberson signed a contract with Parma. At the end of the 2022/2023 regular season, Roberson received the award for "Best Performance of the Season in the VTB United League".

In June 2023, Roberson signed a contract with Samara.

In the 2024/2025 season, he joined Al-Sharjah and became the UAE champion.

On August 6, 2025, Justin signed a contract with KK Cibona.
