= Arthur Edwards (basketball) =

American basketball player (born 1992)

Personal information
- Born: September 28, 1992 (age 34) Washington, D.C., U.S.
- Listed height: 6 ft 6 in (1.98 m)
- Listed weight: 209 lb (95 kg)

Career information
- High school: National Christian Academy (Fort Washington, Maryland)
- College: Northwest Florida (2012–2013); New Mexico (2013–2015); Alabama (2015–2016)
- NBA draft: 2016: undrafted
- Playing career: 2016–2021
- Position: Shooting guard

Career history
- 2016–2017: Maine Red Claws
- 2017–2018: Canton Charge
- 2018–2019: Rilski Sportist
- 2019: BC Boncourt
- 2020–2021: BBC Monthey

Arthur Edwards (born September 28, 1992) is an American former professional basketball player. He played college basketball for Northwest Florida, New Mexico and Alabama.

== College career ==
He played for a year at Northwest Florida State College of the NJCAA, where he averaged 6.4 points, 3.1 rebounds and 1.4 steals per game. In 2013 he transferred to the New Mexico Lobos, where he played two injury-riddled seasons in which he averaged 3.9 points and 1.4 rebounds per game. He transferred again in 2015, this time to the Crimson Tide from the University of Alabama. In his senior season, he ended up averaging 9.5 points, 3.8 rebounds and 1.4 assists per game.

== Professional career ==
After not being chosen in the 2016 NBA draft, he tried out for the Maine Red Claws of the NBA D-League, a team he would end up signing with. He played a season in which he averaged 7.5 points and 3.8 rebounds per game. In September 2017 Edwards was traded to the Canton Charge along with Marcus Thornton, Jalen Jones, and a future second round draft pick in exchange for the rights to Jonathan Holmes and Daniel Coursey. Edwards averaged 6.2 points and 3 rebounds per game for Canton.

On August 25, 2018, Edwards signed with Rilski Sportist of the Bulgarian National Basketball League.

On September 3, 2019, he has signed with BC Boncourt of the Swiss Basketball League.
