= Jérémy Jaunin =

Swiss basketball player

No. 4 – BBC Nyon
- Position: Point guard
- League: Swiss Basketball League

Personal information
- Born: 2 February 1991 (age 35) Geneva, Switzerland
- Listed height: 1.70 m (5 ft 7 in)

Career information
- Playing career: 2008–present

Career history
- 2008–2010: Bernex Basket
- 2010–2016: Lions de Genève
- 2016–2020: Fribourg Olympic
- 2020–2021: Lions de Genève
- 2021–present: BBC Nyon

Career highlights
- Swiss Basketball League Champion - 2013, 2015, 2018, 2019

Jérémy Jaunin is a Swiss professional basketball player.

== Professional career ==
Jaunin started his career with Bernex Basket. In 2010, he switched teams within the Canton of Geneva and joined Lions de Genève where he stayed until 2016.

From 2016 to 2020, Jaunin played for league competitor Fribourg Olympic under the lead of head coach Petar Aleksić.

In April 2020, he rejoined his former team Lions de Genève. Jaunin signed for one season. Back in Geneva, Jaunin has been reunited with head coach Andrej Štimac, a former teammate who was also part of the squad that won the Swiss Basketball League Championship in 2013 and 2015.

== Swiss national team ==
Jaunin has been a member of the Swiss national basketball team.
