= Nemanja Calasan =

Serbian professional basketball player

No. 0 – BC Boncourt
- Position: Power forward / center
- League: Swiss Basketball League

Personal information
- Born: 24 November 1985 (age 40) Nikšić, SR Montenegro, SFR Yugoslavia
- Listed height: 2.04 m (6 ft 8 in)
- Listed weight: 230 lb (104 kg)

Career information
- College: Midland (2005-2007); Purdue (2007–2009)
- NBA draft: 2009: undrafted
- Playing career: 2009–present

Career history
- 2009-2010: Panionios ON Telecoms Athens
- 2009-2010: Étoile Charleville-Mézières
- 2010-2011: BC Boncourt Red Team
- 2011-2012: CS Gaz Metan Medias
- 2012-2013: AS Monaco Basket
- 2013-2014: JA Vichy Val d'Allier Auvergne Basket
- 2014: Benetton Fribourg Olympic
- 2014-2015: Benetton Fribourg Olympic
- 2015-2016: KK Sutjeska Niksic
- 2016: Caen Basket Calvados
- 2016-2017: BC Boncourt Red Team
- 2017–2020: Starwings Basel
- 2020–present: BC Boncourt Red Team

Nemanja Calasan (born 24 November 1985) is a Swiss professional basketball player of Serbian descent who currently plays in the Swiss Basketball League.

Before he joined the Starwings, he played professionally for other teams in Switzerland, Greece, Romania and France.

In 2018, he was the leading scorer of the Swiss Basketball League.

== National team ==
He has been a member of the Swiss national team.

== Personal ==
His parents were refugees who fled from modern-day Croatia when Nemanja Calasan was a child.
