= Jonathan Dubas =

Swiss professional basketball player

No. 15 – Norrköping Dolphins
- Position: Power forward / center
- League: Basketligan

Personal information
- Born: 4 March 1991 (age 35) Vevey, Switzerland
- Listed height: 6 ft 9 in (2.06 m)

Career information
- NBA draft: 2013: undrafted
- Playing career: 2008–present

Career history
- 2010–2013: Monthey
- 2013–2014: Leuven Bears
- 2014: Kangoeroes Willebroek
- 2015: Lugano Tigers
- 2015–2017: Monthey
- 2017–present: Norrköping Dolphins

Career highlights
- Swiss League champion (2017)
Medals
Men's 3x3 basketball
Representing Switzerland
FIBA 3x3 World Cup
Silver medal – second place	2025 Ulaanbaatar	Team

Jonathan Dubas (born 4 March 1991) is a Swiss professional basketball player. He currently plays for the Norrköping Dolphins of the Basketligan in Sweden. Dubas re-signed with the team on 27 August 2018.

He has been a member of the Swiss national basketball team as well as Swiss youth national teams on several occasions.
