= Roberto Kovac =

Swiss basketball player

No. 24 – Robur et Fides Varese
- Position: Shooting guard
- League: Serie C

Personal information
- Born: 2 May 1990 (age 36) Mendrisio, Switzerland
- Listed height: 6 ft 3 in (1.91 m)

Career information
- Playing career: 2008–present

Career history
- 2008–2011: SAV Vacallo Basket
- 2011–2016: Fribourg Olympic
- 2016–2019: Lions de Genève
- 2019: KK Cibona
- 2019–2020: ÍR
- 2020–2021: Lions de Genève
- 2021–2023: Spinelli Massagno
- 2023–2025: Fribourg Olympic
- 2025–present: Robur et Fides Varese

Roberto Kovac (born 2 May 1990) is a Swiss professional basketball player for Robur et Fides Varese of the Italian Serie C league. He has been a member of the Swiss national basketball team and participated at the 2015 EuroBasket qualification.

== Club career ==
In August 2019, Kovac signed with Úrvalsdeild karla club ÍR. On 29 August it was reported that Kovac had signed a contract with Croatian club KK Cibona even though he was still under contract for the season with ÍR. In September, Cibona bought up Kovac's contract við ÍR. In December 2019, Kovac left Cibona and signed back with ÍR. He appeared in 10 games for Cibona in the A-1 Liga, averaging 6.4 points and 1.6 rebounds. He also appeared in 9 Liga ABA games for Cibona where he averaged 2.8 points in only 8.9 minutes per game.

== National team career ==
On 21 August 2019, Kovac scored 29 points for Switzerland as it beat Iceland in the EuroBasket 2021 pre-qualification to advance to the main qualification stage.
