= Petar Aleksić =

Bosnian–Swiss coach and former basketball player

Ole Miss Rebels
- Title: Assistant coach
- League: Southeastern Conference

Personal information
- Born: 2 November 1968 (age 58) Trebinje, SR Bosnia and Herzegovina, SFR Yugoslavia
- Listed height: 1.98 m (6 ft 6 in)

Career information
- Playing career: 1996–2004
- Position: Forward
- Coaching career: 2004–present

Career history

Playing
- 1996–1998: FMP Železnik
- 1998: ZTE
- 1999–2001: Union Neuchâtel
- 2001–2002: BBC Nyon
- 2003–2004: Leotar Trebinje

Coaching
- 2004–2006: BBC Feldkirch Baskets (assistant)
- 2006–2007: Union Neuchâtel
- 2007–2009: Alba Berlin (assistant)
- 2010–2011: Union Neuchâtel
- 2011–2013: Monthey
- 2012: Switzerland under-20
- 2013–2023: Fribourg Olympic
- 2013–2016: Switzerland
- 2024: Iraklis
- 2024–2025: FMP
- 2026–present: Ole Miss (assistant)

Career highlights
- As head coach: 6× Swiss League champion (2016, 2018, 2019, 2021–2023); 5× Swiss Cup champion (2016, 2018, 2019, 2022, 2023); 3× Swiss League Cup champion (2018, 2020, 2022); 4× Swiss SuperCup champion (2016, 2020–2022); As assistant coach: German League champion (2008)

Petar Aleksić (born 2 November 1968) is a Bosnian–Swiss professional basketball coach and former basketball player.

== Playing career ==
As a professional player, he played in the Federal Republic of Yugoslavia, Hungary, Switzerland and Bosnia and Herzegovina.

== Coaching career ==
After his retirement as a player he won the Basketball Bundesliga (BBL) as assistant coach of Alba Berlin. He also coached BBC Feldkirch Baskets in Austria and several Swiss teams as head coach.

On June 25, 2024, he joined Iraklis of the Elite League Greece.

=== Switzerland's national team ===
From 2013 until 2016, he coached Switzerland's national basketball team, which he led to a surprise victory over Russia at the 2015 EuroBasket qualification.
