= Ivica Radosavljević =

Serbian/Swiss basketball player

Ivica Radosavljević (Serbian Cyrillic: Ивица Радосављевић; born December 13, 1983) is a Serbian / Swiss retired professional basketball player and now basketball coach and works in basketball Academy of Fribourg Olympic.

Radosavljević spent most of his career in Switzerland. At 6 ft 10 in (2.08 m), most of his career he played as a power forward.

Radosavljević grew up in Buljane village in the municipality of Paraćin, Serbia. He began playing basketball in his home town Paraćin, for the team KK Paraćin. At 16 he moved up to Switzerland and played for STB Bern-Giants, Union Neuchâtel, Boncourt, BC Chêne, Villars Basket and La Chaux de Fonds Basket.

Since then, he has coached a team in Val-de-Ruz Basket where he won the Second league title in the season 2017/2018 and Swiss 1LN M title in the season 2018/2019.

In 2020 he became assistant coach of Fribourg Olympic of the Swiss Basketball League (SBL). For three seasons as assistant, he helped the team to win three Swiss Championships, two SBL Cups, one League Cup and three Super Cups.

However, in 2023 after the club and the legendary head coach Petar Aleksić parted their ways, he continues to work as a youth coach in Fribourg Olympic Academy.

With the Academy he won the title with the U18 team in the season 2023/2024 and he was a vice-champion in the season 2025/2026. With the U20 team he won back to back championships in the seasons 2024/2025 and 2025/2026.
