= Ismaël N'Diaye =

Ivorian basketball player

Personal information
- Born: 20 April 1982 (age 44) Abidjan, Ivory Coast
- Listed height: 6 ft 6 in (1.98 m)

Career information
- College: Miami (Florida) (2002–2003); Los Angeles CC (2003–2004); FIU (2004–2006)
- Playing career: 2006–2018
- Position: Small forward
- Number: 10

Career history
- 2006–2011: Lausanne
- 2011–2016: Boncourt
- 2016–2018: Riviera Lakers

Ismaël N'Diaye (born 20 April 1982) is an Ivorian basketball player formerly at Florida International University in Miami. He is originally from Abidjan, Côte d'Ivoire. A 6-foot-5.5-inches and 190 lbs small forward, N'Diaye played one year of college basketball at the University of Miami before transferring to Los Angeles City College for one year and Florida International University for his final two years of eligibility. His best season was the 2004–05 season at Florida International, in which he averaged 13.4 points per game for the Golden Panthers.

N'Diaye is a longtime member and captain of the Côte d'Ivoire national basketball team and helped the team to a surprise silver medal at the 2009 African Championship. He also participated with the team at the 2007 FIBA Africa Championship.
