= Herb Johnson (basketball) =

American basketball player

Personal information
- Born: December 16, 1962 (age 63) Midland, Texas
- Listed height: 6 ft 10 in (2.08 m)

Career information
- College: University of Tulsa
- NBA draft: 1985: 3rd round, 55th overall pick
- Drafted by: Cleveland Cavaliers
- Playing career: 1981–1985
- Position: Power forward/center
- Stats at Basketball Reference

Herb Johnson (born Herb Johnson Wilkerson) is a former professional basketball player with Villars Basket in Switzerland. Johnson played collegiately with the University of Tulsa.

== College career ==
At Tulsa, Johnson helped the team to the 1981 NIT title and appearances in the 1982, 1983, and 1984 NCAA Tournaments. As of 2010, Johnson is in the top 5 of Golden Hurricane career leaders in rebounds, top 10 in steals, and top 15 in scoring.

== Professional career ==
Johnson was a third-round pick of the Cleveland Cavaliers in the 1985 NBA draft. His professional career has included stops in France, Spain, Japan, Turkey and most recently Switzerland. Johnson played the 2004–05 season with Union Neuchâtel Basket, 2005 to 2007 with Pages Jaunes Pully Basket, and the 2008–09 season with Vevey Riviera Basket. He joined Villars Basket for the 2009 season.

== Personal life ==
Johnson's daughter Brandie Wilkerson is a professional beach volleyball player for Canada. Wilkerson was born in Switzerland and moved to Canada along with Johnson when she was seven. His wife, Wilkerson's mother, Stephanie (born in Tramelan), was a Swiss national runner and a two-time Ironman finalist.
