= Klimkowski =

Klimkowski may refer to:

- Ed Klimkowski, retired American professional basketball coach
- Jan Klimkowski (born 2007), Polish chess grandmaster
- Ron Klimkowski (1944–2009), American baseball player
