= Alain Attalah =

Egyptian basketball player

Alain Attallah الان بيير عطا االله
Lions de Genève
- Title: Head coach
- League: Swiss Basketball League

Personal information
- Born: October 5, 1964 (age 62) Alexandria, Egypt
- Listed height: 1.88 m (6 ft 2 in)
- Listed weight: 88 kg (194 lb)
- Position: Guard
- Coaching career: 2013–present

Career history

Coaching
- 2013–2014: Stevnsgade Basketball
- 2004–2016: Denmark Under-18
- 2015–2016: SISU Copenhagen
- 2016–2017: Stevnsgade Basketball
- 2018–2021: Nyon
- 2022–present: Lions de Genève

Career highlights
- NLB champion (2018)

Alain Pierre Joseph Attalah (Arabic: الان بيير عطا االله; born 5 October 1964) is an Egyptian basketball coach and former player. He is the current head coach of Lions de Genève of the Swiss Basketball League (SBL).

As a player, Attallah competed with the Egypt national basketball team at the 1984 and 1988 games. He posted an Olympic high of 22 points and 5 assists in a 138-85 loss to Brazil in 1988.

From 2018 to 2022, Attallah was the head coach of Swiss club BBC Nyon.
