= Arnaud Cotture =

Swiss professional basketball player

No. 20 – Fribourg Olympic
- Position: Power forward
- League: Swiss Basketball League

Personal information
- Born: 9 August 1995 (age 31) Martigny, Switzerland
- Listed height: 6 ft 8 in (2.03 m)

Career information
- Playing career: 2010–present

Career history
- 2010–2017: Fribourg Olympic
- 2017–2020: Lions de Geneve
- 2020–present: Fribourg Olympic

Career highlights
- 2× Swiss League champion (2021, 2022)

Arnaud Cotture (born 9 August 1995) is a Swiss professional basketball player. He currently plays for Fribourg Olympic of the Swiss Basketball League.

He represented Switzerland's national basketball team at the EuroBasket 2017 qualification, where he was Switzerland's best shot blocker.
