= Abdou Badji =

Senegalese basketball player

Free Agent
- Position: Power forward

Personal information
- Born: 4 April 1992 (age 34) Dakar, Senegal
- Listed height: 6 ft 9 in (2.06 m)
- Listed weight: 210 lb (95 kg)

Career information
- NBA draft: 2014: undrafted
- Playing career: 2010–present

Career history
- 2010–2012: SAV Vacallo
- 2012–2015: Union Neuchâtel
- 2015–2016: SAM Massagno
- 2016–2018: Kangoeroes Willebroek
- 2018–2019: Champagne Châlons-Reims
- 2020–2021: Okapi Aalst
- 2021–2022: Phoenix Brussels

Abdou Pape Badji (born 4 April 1992) is a Senegalese professional basketball player who last played for Phoenix Brussels of the BNXT League. He represents the Senegalese national team, where he participated at the 2014 FIBA Basketball World Cup.

== Professional career ==
On 5 June 2018, Badji signed with Champagne Châlons-Reims Basket of the French Pro A.

On 11 June 2020, he has signed with Okapi Aalst of the Pro Basketball League.

== National team career ==
In summer 2013 he participated with the Senegal National team at the 2013 FIBA Africa Championship, where they finished in the 3rd position.

In 2014, he played in the 2014 FIBA Basketball World Cup. Senegal reached the eightfinals, where they lost again Spain. Badji scored 12 points and collected 7 rebounds in that game, against players such as Pau Gasol, Marc Gasol or Serge Ibaka.

In summer 2015 he's also been selected with the Senegal National team to play in the 2015 FIBA Africa Championship.
