= Jean-Marc Jaumin =

Belgian basketball player and coach

Personal information
- Born: 5 February 1970 (age 56) Berchem-Sainte-Agathe, Belgium
- Listed height: 6 ft 2 in (1.88 m)
- Listed weight: 195 lb (88 kg)

Career information
- Playing career: 1990–2006
- Position: Point guard
- Number: 4, 18
- Coaching career: 2008–present

Career history

Playing
- 1990–1999: Oostende
- 1999–2001: Málaga
- 2001: Apollon Patras
- 2001–2002: Real Madrid
- 2002: Gran Canaria
- 2002–2005: Mons-Hainaut
- 2005–2006: Oostende

Coaching
- 2008–2010: Oostende (assistant)
- 2010–2011: Oostende
- 2012–2014: Den Helder Kings
- 2015–2016: Lugano Tigers
- 2016–2017: Lions de Genève
- 2017–2019: Okapi Aalstar
- 2019–2021: Heroes Den Bosch
- 2021–2023: Circus Brussels
- 2023–2024: Landstede Hammers

Career highlights
- As a player: FIBA European Selection Team (1998); FIBA Korać Cup champion (2001); 2× Belgian League champion (1995, 2006); 3× Belgian Cup winner (1991, 1995, 1998); Belgian Super Cup winner (1998); 3× Belgian Player of the Year (1995, 1997, 2006); As an assistant coach: 2× Belgian Cup winner (2008, 2010); As a head coach: Swiss Super Cup winner (2015); Swiss Cup winner (2017)

Jean-Marc Jaumin (born 5 February 1970) is a Belgian professional basketball coach and former basketball player. He was most recently the head coach of Landstede Hammers of the BNXT League.

== Professional playing career ==
Jaumin was a 1.88 m (6 ft 2 in) tall point guard, who played ten seasons for the Belgian club Oostende. He also played three seasons in Spain, where hmost notably played for the Spanish ACB League clubs Málaga and Real Madrid. During his pro club career, Jaumin was a three-time Belgian Player of the Year, and a two-time Belgian League champion with Oostende.

== Coaching career ==
Following his playing career, Jaumin started working as a basketball coach. He began coaching as an assistant with Oostende. After being an assistant coach for two years with Oostende, the club Jaumin had also played for, Jaumin became the team's head coach in 2010. In 2011, he was fired.

Jaumin signed a one-year contract with Den Helder Kings, to be their head coach, in 2012. In December 2012, he signed on to coach Den Helder for another 4 years. Eight games into the 2014–15 season, Jaumin resigned after Kings didn't pay his salary caused by financial problems of the club. He later returned, but the club was eventually declared bankrupt.

In 2015, he signed with Lugano Tigers, to be the club's head coach, in the Swiss LNBA.

In 2016, Jaumin signed with the Swiss club Lions de Genève, as the club's new head coach, for the 2016–17 season.

In April 2017, Jaumin was announced as the new head coach of the Belgian club Okapi Aalstar. In March 2019, Jaumin parted ways with Okapi after disappointing results.

Jaumin signed with the Dutch club New Heroes Den Bosch, as their new head coach, for the 2019–20 season.

On 19 October 2021, he signed with the Belgian club Phoenix Brussels of the BNXT League, becoming the club's head coach in the process. In March 2023, Brussels announced that head coach Jaumin would be replaced by Serge Crevecoeur, for the 2023–24 season.

On 5 June 2023, Jaumin signed with the Dutch club Landstede Hammers, of the BNXT League, to the position of head coach.
