= 1953 Latin Cup (basketball) =

- Sport: Basketball
- Finals champions: (Spain) Real Madrid
- Runners-up: (Italy) Borletti Milano

Latin Cup seasons
- 1966 →

The 1953 Latin Cup was the 1st edition of the Latin Cup. It took place at Frontón Recoletos, Madrid, Spain, on April 5-8, 1953 with the participations of Real Madrid, Borletti Milano Milano (champions of the 1951–52 Lega Basket Serie A), ASVEL (champions of the 1951–52 Nationale 1) and Jonction (champions of the 1952–53 Ligue Nationale A). In the Day 3 where the match held the title, Real Madrid won Borletti by 63–58 and became Latin Cup champions.

== League stage ==
Venue: Frontón Recoletos

Day 1, April 5, 1953

Day 2, April 6, 1953

Day 3, April 8, 1953: Real Madrid - Olimpia de Borletti Milano 63-58

== Winning roster ==
Freddy Borrás, José Antonio Muñoz, José Manuel Becerra, Domingo Bárcenas, José “Pepito” Garrido, Félix Sánchez-Lauhle, Guillermo “Willo” Galíndez, Pedro Martínez Arroyo, Wenceslao Oceja, Manuel Martínez, Ignacio Pinedo, Rafael Becedas, Jesús Becedas, Ängel Guerra, Carlos Bea, Jorge Bonet, Emilio Villanueva. Coach: Freddy Borrás.

1953 Latin Cup Champions

Real Madrid
1st title
