= Dušan Mlađan =

Swiss basketball player

No. 21 – SAM Basket
- Position: Shooting guard
- League: Championnat LNA

Personal information
- Born: November 16, 1986 (age 39) Belgrade, SFR Yugoslavia
- Listed height: 6 ft 6 in (1.98 m)
- Listed weight: 189 lb (86 kg)

Career information
- NBA draft: 2008: undrafted
- Playing career: 2002–present

Career history
- 2002–2004: BC79 Arbedo
- 2004–2005: Lugano Tigers
- 2005–2006: Snaidero Udine
- 2006–2007: Viola Reggio Calabria
- 2007: Pallacanestro Varese
- 2008: Lugano Tigers
- 2008: Sutor Montegranaro
- 2008: Roseto Sharks
- 2009–2013: Lugano Tigers
- 2013–2014: Radnički Kragujevac
- 2014–2016: Lions de Genève
- 2016–2019: Fribourg Olympic
- 2019–present: SAM Basket

Dušan Mlađan (Anglicized: Dusan Mladjan, Serbian Cyrillic: Душан Млађан; born November 16, 1986) is a Serbian–born Swiss professional basketball player who currently plays for SAM Basket of the Championnat LNA.

== Professional career ==
On August 15, 2013, he signed with Radnički Kragujevac of Serbia for the 2013–14 season.

In November 2014, he returned to Switzerland and signed with Lions de Genève. He left the club after two seasons, and in September 2016, he signed with Fribourg Olympic.
