= Urania Genève Sport (basketball) =

- Founded: 1930
- History: 1930–Present
- Location: Geneva, Switzerland
- Team colors
- Championships: 15 Swiss League; 3 Swiss Cups
Home	Away

Urania Genève Sport is a professional basketball club, section of the eponymous UGS multi-sports club, based in Geneva, Switzerland.

== History ==
The basketball section of UGS was founded in 1930 and became one of the powerhouses in the Swiss League having won 15 champion titles.

== Honour & achievements ==
Swiss League

- Winners (15): 1937-38, 1938–39, 1941–42, 1942–43, 1943–44, 1944–45, 1946–47, 1947–48, 1948–49, 1949–50, 1558–59, 1959–60, 1964–65, 1965–66, 1967–68

Swiss Cup

- Winners (3): 1941-42, 1959–60, 1960–61
