= Larry O'Bannon =

American basketball player

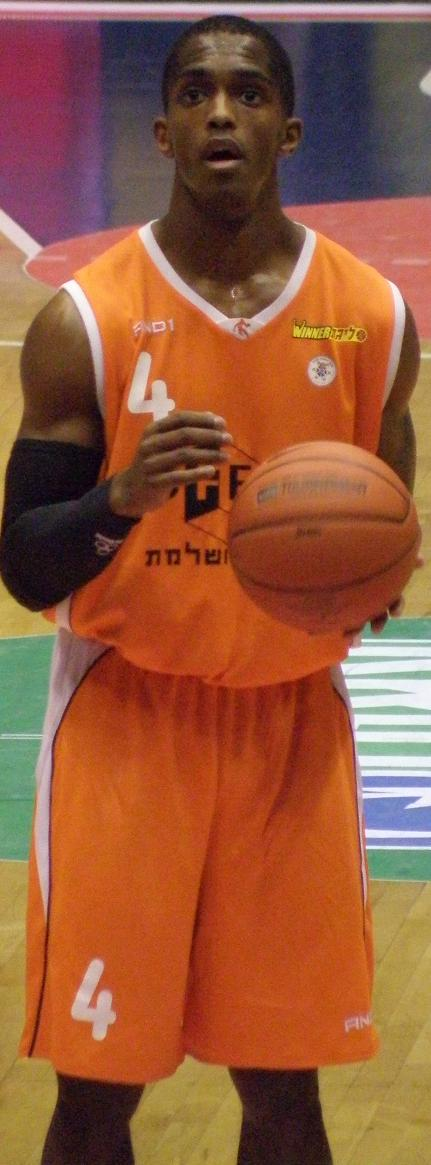
- Image of Larry O'Bannon

No. 4 – Hispano Americano
- Position: Point guard / shooting guard
- League: LNB

Personal information
- Born: August 15, 1983 (age 43) Louisville, Kentucky
- Listed height: 6 ft 4.5 in (1.94 m)
- Listed weight: 201 lb (91 kg)

Career information
- High school: Male (Louisville, Kentucky)
- College: Louisville (2001–2005)
- NBA draft: 2005: undrafted
- Playing career: 2005–present

Career history
- 2005–2006: Crvena zvezda
- 2006–2007: Amatori Udine
- 2007: Basket Napoli
- 2007: AGO Rethymno
- 2007–2008: Lukoil Academic
- 2009–2010: Maccabi Rishon LeZion
- 2010: Marinos de Anzoátegui
- 2010–2011: Maccabi Haifa
- 2011–2012: Boca Juniors
- 2012: Club Atlético Lanús
- 2012–2013: SAV Vacallo Basket
- 2013: Hapoel Eilat
- 2013–2014: Sharks Antibes
- 2014: Krasnye Krylia
- 2014: Maccabi Rishon LeZion
- 2014–2015: Hapoel Tel Aviv
- 2015–2016: San Martín de Corrientes
- 2016–present: Hispano Americano

Career highlights
- Serbian Cup winner (2006)

Larry O'Bannon (born August 15, 1983) is an American professional basketball player for Hispano Americano of the Liga Nacional de Básquet (LNB). He played college basketball for the University of Louisville.

== Early life ==
O'Bannon attended Jefferson County Traditional Middle School. He attended Male High School where he competed in basketball and track and field. He played on the same basketball team as Oakland Raiders running back Michael Bush, who was also his teammate in middle school. O'Bannon has a sister who teaches at Meyzeek Middle School.

== College career ==
O’Bannon played college basketball for the Louisville Cardinals at the University of Louisville from 2001 to 2005 under head coach Rick Pitino. A guard, O’Bannon developed into a key contributor during his collegiate career and emerged as one of the team’s leaders by his senior season.

During the 2004–05 season, he helped lead Louisville to a 33–5 record and a berth in the 2005 NCAA Division I men’s basketball tournament with the team making it all the way to the Final Four. He was instrumental in the team’s run and was named the Albuquerque Regional Most Outstanding Player after leading Louisville through the regional rounds.

== Pro career ==
O'Bannon went undrafted in the 2005 NBA draft. During the summer of 2005, he played for the Seattle SuperSonics and the Golden State Warriors in the NBA Summer League. In August 2005, he signed his first professional contract with Serbian club Crvena zvezda. With them he played one season, and won the Serbian Cup.

In September 2007, O'Bannon signed with Amatori Udine of the Italian Serie A. On February 7, 2007, he left Udine and moved to Basket Napoli for the rest of the season.

In July 2007, he joined the Denver Nuggets for the 2007 NBA Summer League. The 2007–08 season he started with AGO Rethymno of the Greek A1 League, but was released after appearing in seven games. On December 17, 2007, he signed with Bulgarian club Lukoil Academic, and stayed with them for the rest of the season.

In January 2009, O'Bannon signed with Israeli club Maccabi Rishon LeZion for the rest of the season. On August 28, 2009, he re-signed with Rishon LeZion for one more year.

In May 2010, he signed with Marinos de Anzoátegui of Venezuela for the rest of the 2010 LPB season. On September 16, 2010, he returned to Israel and signed with Maccabi Haifa, but was released in February 2011. On February 28, 2011, he signed with Boca Juniors. In August 2011, he re-signed with Boca for the 2011–12 season. On April 20, 2012, he signed with Club Atlético Lanús, where he played only one game.

In July 2012, O'Bannon signed with SAV Vacallo Basket of Switzerland. In February 2013, he left Vacallo and signed with Israeli club Hapoel Eilat for the rest of the season. On August 7, 2013, he signed with Sharks Antibes of the French LNB Pro A. On January 30, 2014, he left Antibes and signed with Russian club Krasnye Krylia for the rest of the season.

In September 2014, O'Bannon signed with his former club Maccabi Rishon LeZion. He was released by Maccabi after only three games and in November 2014, he moved to another Israeli club Hapoel Tel Aviv for the 2014–15 season. In his debut for Hapoel, he finished with 29 points and 13 rebounds.

In August 2015, he signed with San Martín de Corrientes of Argentina for the 2015–16 season. In November 2016, he signed with Hispano Americano also of Argentina.
