= 1966 Latin Cup (basketball) =

- Sport: Basketball
- Finals champions: (Italy) Simmenthal Milano
- Runners-up: (Spain) Real Madrid

Latin Cup seasons
- ← 1953 1967 →

The 1966 Latin Cup was the 2nd edition of the Latin Cup. It took place at Pabellón de la Ciudad Deportiva del Real Madrid, Madrid, Spain, on 24, 25 and 26 December 1966 with the participations of Simmenthal Milano (champions of the 1965–66 FIBA European Champions Cup, Real Madrid (champions of the 1965–66 Liga Española de Baloncesto), ASVEL (champions of the 1965–66 Nationale 1) and Benfica (champions of the 1964–65 Liga Portuguesa de Basquetebol).

== League stage ==
Day 1, December 24, 1966,

Day 2, December 25, 1966,

Day 3, December 26, 1966

1966 Latin Cup Champions

Simmenthal Milano
1st title
