= Latin Cup (basketball) =

Defunct international basketball tournament

- Sport: Basketball
- Founded: 1953
- Folded: 1966
- Continent: Europe
- Last champions: (Italy) Simmenthal Milano (1st title)
- Most titles: (Spain) Real Madrid (Italy) Olimpia Milano (1 title)

The Latin Cup (French: Coupe Latine; Italian: Coppa Latina ; Portuguese: Taça Latina or Copa Latina; Spanish: Copa Latina) was an international basketball tournament for club sides from the Latin European nations of France, Italy, Spain, and from Switzerland or Portugal, in a similar way than the Latin Cup of football.

== History ==
The basketball tournament did not start until 1953, being the immediate precedent of the precursor competition of the European Cup organized by FIBA in the 1957-58 season. The competition was organized by the Commission of International Organizations of Basketball - an organization belonging to the maximum basketball estate of the FIBA - jointly with the national federations of the participating clubs.

In spite of the football precedent and the success, Latin Cup had only two editions. After the first celebrated the same year of its establishment, the second one took place on the occasion of the second edition of a competition sponsored by the FIBA and later named the FIBA International Christmas Tournament. It was decided that this second edition would be recognized as the second Latin Cup due to the origin of the participants, and in an attempt to relaunch the competition, held in December 1966 in the Pabellón de la Ciudad Deportiva del Real Madrid.

A tournament in America has been held since 1989 (organized in Panama by the Panamanian Basketball Federation, FEPABA), being a competition between national basketball teams also called Copa Latina.

== Results ==
Year	Champion	Second place	Third place	Fourth place	Results / Notes
1953; Details	(Spain); Real Madrid	(Italy); Borletti Milano	(France); ASVEL	(Switzerland); Jonction	Four team league stage.
1966; Details	(Italy); Simmenthal Milano	(Spain); Real Madrid	(France); ASVEL	(Portugal); Benfica	Four team league stage.

== Titles by club ==
Rank	Club	Titles	Runner-up	Champion Years
=1.	(Spain) Real Madrid	1	1	1953
=1.	(Italy) Olimpia Milano	1	1	1966

== Titles by nation ==
Rank	Country	Titles	Runners-up
1.	Spain	1	1
2.	Italy	1	1

== See also ==
- FIBA International Christmas Tournament
