= SP Federale Lugano =

- Leagues: LNBA
- Founded: 1942
- History: SP Federale Lugano; 1942→1981
- Location: Lugano, Switzerland
- Team colors: yellow and light blue
- Championships: 3 Swiss Leagues; 3 Swiss Cups
Home	Away

SP Federale Lugano was a Swiss professional basketball club based in the city of Lugano in the canton of Ticino.

== History ==
Federale was founded in 1942 but had to wait until the 70s to see the first major successes. The club won in the seventies three national league titles and 2 national Cups. For three seasons, from 1978 to 1980, had as main sponsor the SA Luciano Franzosini Chiasso.

In the season 1975-76 Federale participated in the FIBA European Champions Cup as Swiss champion after two qualifier against Turkish Beşiktaş and Czechoslovak Dukla Olomouc, reached the quarter-finals where ranked sixth and last with a record of 0-5 wins in a group that included among others Real Madrid, Forst Cantù and Maccabi Tel Aviv.

In 1981 the club merged with AS Viganello Basket (later with the Molino Nuovo), giving rise to the FV Lugano (today Lugano Tigers).

== Honours ==
Swiss League

- Winners (3): 1974-75, 1975–76, 1976–77

Swiss Cup

- Winners (3): 1957-58, 1973–74, 1974–75

== Historic players ==
- (Mexico) Manuel Raga
- (United States) Louis Dunbar
- (United States) Ron Sanford
