= AS Viganello Basket =

Swiss basketball club

AS Viganello
- Leagues: LNBA
- Founded: 1942
- History: 1942–1981
- Arena: Lambertenghi; Gerra; Palaghiaccio di Mezzovico
- Location: Viganello, Switzerland
- Team colors: Green and White
- President: Luigi Roda (Switzerland)
- Head coach: Franco Bassi (Switzerland)
- Championships: 1 Swiss Championship; 2 Swiss Cups
Home	Away

AS Viganello, also known as Viganello Basket, was a Swiss men's and women's professional basketball club based in the city of Viganello. The club was played for several years in the National League A and won the Swiss men's championship in 1980 and the Swiss Men's Cup in 1977 and 1980.

== History ==
AS Viganello began as a women's team in 1942, in the village of Ticino (now district of the city of Lugano) and in 1943 it also added a men's team.

Thanks to the arrival of important players such as Ken Brady, John Fultz and Charlie Yelverton, the men's team began to achieve success. In 1977 Viganello played in the Swiss Cup finals against Pregassona in front of a sold out crowd. After a tightly played game, Viganello came out on top after overtime, winning 107-103. It added another cup victory in 1980 as well as the Swiss national championship.

The club folded after the 1980–1981 season due to financial difficulties and as a result, merged with Federal Lugano into the FV Lugano.

== European club competitions ==
The club competed in the following European competitions.

Season	Competition	Progress
1977–78	European Cup Winners' Cup	Second qualifying round
1980–81	FIBA European Champions Cup	Quarterfinals group stage

== Honours ==
=== Men's team ===
Swiss League:

- Winners (1): 1979–80

Swiss Cup

- Winners (2): 1976–77, 1979–80

== Notable players ==
Note: Flags indicate national team eligibility at FIBA-sanctioned events. Players may hold other non-FIBA nationalities not displayed.

Criteria

To appear in this section a player must have either:

- Set a club record or won an individual award while at the club
- Played at least one official international match for their national team at any time
- Played at least one official NBA match at any time.

- (United States) Charlie Yelverton (1979–1980)
