= Jermaine Turner =

American-Irish basketball player

Personal information
- Born: July 29, 1974 (age 52) Brooklyn, New York, U.S.
- Listed height: 197 cm (6 ft 6 in)
- Listed weight: 99 kg (218 lb)

Career information
- High school: John Adams (Queens, New York)
- College: Dowling (1999–2000)
- NBA draft: 2000: undrafted
- Playing career: 2000–2017
- Position: Forward
- Coaching career: 2017–present

Career history

Playing
- 2000: Capitanes de Arecibo
- 2000–2001: Dungannon
- 2001–2002: Tralee Tigers
- 2002–2003: UCD Marian
- 2003: Tolka Rovers
- 2003–2004: St. Vincent's
- 2004–2005: SAV Vacallo Basket
- 2005: Salon Vilpas Vikings
- 2005–2006: St. Vincent's
- 2006: CSU Sibiu
- 2006–2007: St. Vincent's
- 2007: Mérida Patrimonio de la Humanita
- 2007: BBC Nyon
- 2007: Ballina
- 2007–2009: CB Tíjola
- 2009–2012: Killester
- 2014–2017: Killester

Coaching
- 2017–2018: Chatham (assistant)
- 2018–2023: Carnegie Mellon (assistant)

Career highlights
- 3× Irish League champion (2006, 2010, 2011); Irish National Cup champion (2010); Irish National Cup Final MVP (2010); Irish League Finals MVP (2006); 2× Irish League All-Star First Pick (2016, 2017); Irish League All-Star Third Pick (2015); Swiss LNB champion (2005); Swiss LNB MVP (2005); All Ireland Top 8 champion (2002)

Jermaine Turner (born July 29, 1974) is an American-Irish former professional basketball player who spent the majority of his 17-year career playing in the Irish Super League. Turner first arrived in Ireland in 2000 following a season of college basketball with Dowling College. Over 17 years, he spent time with Dungannon, Tralee, Ballina, Tolka Rovers, UCD Marian, St Vincent's, and Killester. He also had stints in Switzerland, Finland, Romania and Spain.

Turner helped St. Vincent's and Killester win Super League championships. He was named the Most Valuable Player of the 2006 finals weekend after leading St Vincent's to their first title since 1994. In 2010 and 2011, he led Killester to back-to-back league championships. Elsewhere he won the Swiss Division Two league title and MVP honors in 2005 with Vacallo.

== Early life ==
Turner was born in Brownsville, Brooklyn. At the age of four, his mother moved the family to LeFrak City, Queens. According to Turner, "You couldn't be seen on the streets [of Brownsville] after a certain hour, because the place was like the wild, wild West. Everyone had a gun." Turner grew up in Queens and attended John Adams High School, a school renowned for its American football programme. Turner initially played football as a wide receiver before turning his attention to basketball heading into his junior year.

Turner quickly acquired good dunking skills, but when he tried out for the school team in the fall of his junior year, he failed to make the squad, with the coach noting that there was more to basketball than dunking. That year, Turner trained with Vincent Smith, the brother of NBA star Kenny Smith, after encountering him in a hall just off Queens Boulevard. As a result, he made the team as a senior and earned himself a university scholarship.

== College career ==
Turner's college career was turbulent. He first played with Orange County Community College but his brash, flash style didn't enamour him to his coach. On one road trip, Turner and a teammate got into a scuffle after that player knocked Turner's tray in a fast-food restaurant. The coach told Turner to cool it but once they got back on campus, Turner exacted retribution. The next day when the coach saw that teammate sporting a black eye, he summoned Turner to his office and kicked him off the team.

As a result, Turner enlisted in a junior college across the street from the World Trade Center, prompting him to be recruited by a Division Two college. However, the programme was put on probation after a number of ineligible players had also been signed. Turner subsequently dropped out of college and took up a job working for FedEx.

In his time away from college during the 1990s playing in New York City indoor leagues and at playgrounds, Turner met future NBA champion Ron Artest. Both Turner and Artest lived in Queens and played in tournaments at Rucker Park.

Turner returned to college in 1999. He joined NCAA Division II's Dowling College and went on to average 20 points and 10 rebounds per game during the 1999–2000 season. He earned All-America honors at Dowling and received his bachelor's degree in Sociology.

== Professional career ==
=== Landing in Ireland (2000) ===
After college, Turner was invited to a free agent camp in Utah—a camp where college seniors who are under the radar go and try to continue their careers. Turner was befriended by a former owner of a BBL team, Bob Wood. Wood told Turner that he would keep him in mind if a team contacted him about players. Later that summer, Turner received a call from Chester Jets coach Robbie Peers. He told Turner that he would sign him if his first choice, former NBA player Loren Meyer, fell through. Meyer did sign with them, and so the search continued. After a 15-game stint in Puerto Rico with Capitanes de Arecibo, where he averaged 10.7 points and 5.3 rebounds, Turner received a call from Irishman Frankie O'Loane on September 10, 2000. It was O'Loane who brought Turner to Ireland to play for Tyrone Towers in Dungannon. Turner arrived in Ireland on September 18, 2000, to begin his first professional season.

=== Early years in Ireland (2000–2004) ===
Listed as a 6'5" forward/center in 2000, Turner was a 26-year-old rookie with Dungannon. At first, Turner didn't know what to make of Ireland. He was struck by the locals' hospitality and intrigued by the country's history, but he was initially unimpressed by the amenities and customs. Turner explained, "I was still on my spoiled American high horse. 'The locker rooms are too small. I've got to carry my own bag. We don't practice enough. They want me to coach the local kids when I just want to play.' But when I went back to America for the Christmas break, I realised that I had to take my blinders off or I'd end up just like my friends at home, doing nothing or working in a job they hated." He came to embrace the lifestyle and it showed on and off the court. However, while he was considered 'prolific' and made a significant contribution every game, he often lacked support in offensive situations. In a 92–74 loss to Tralee Tigers in January 2001, Turner had a 49-point effort.

In September 2001, Turner signed with Tralee for the 2001–02 season. Turner teamed up with fellow American Barnaby Craddock and Canadians Paul Williscroft and Rob Schrurer. In his second year in the Irish League, Turner helped Tralee finish as regular-season runners-up with a 20–6 record. On March 24, 2002, Tralee landed the All Ireland Top 8 title after an enthralling victory over Killester in the final. Turner scored a game-high 22 points in the 78–69 win.

In the summer of 2002, Tralee hired a new coach, Rus Bradburd, who wanted to recruit his own professionals. Bradburd passed on Turner, who instead took up an offer to play with UCD Marian.

After one season with Marian, Turner joined Tolka Rovers for the 2003–04 season. However, the team did not receive the required funding for the season from Tolka Rovers F.C. As a result, the team had severe financial problems and not only had to postpone three matches, but were forced to release their two Americans, Turner and Kenny McFarland, along with coach Martin McGettrick. Tolka completed just five games in 2003–04 before withdrawing mid-season. Turner was quickly picked up by St. Vincent's for the rest of the season. Turner played his last game for Tolka on November 8 and made his debut for St. Vincent's on November 16.

=== Switzerland and Finland (2004–2005) ===
While it seemed baffling that a player of his quality was allowed to leave any Superleague team, Turner noted in 2012, had he not departed Irish shores, temporarily as it happened, he would never have enjoyed what he describes as his most enjoyable experience away from Ireland: winning the Swiss Division Two league title and MVP honors in 2004–05 with Vacallo. In 18 games for Vacallo, he averaged a league-leading 30.8 points, 12.8 rebounds, 1.9 assists, 5.5 steals and 2.8 blocks per game.

In September 2005, Turner signed with Finnish team Salon Vilpas Vikings for the 2005–06 season. However, he parted ways with Salon on November 2 and returned to Ireland due to homesickness. In six games for the team, he averaged 27.5 points, 14.0 rebounds, 1.5 assists, 3.3 steals and 2.7 blocks per game.

=== Return to St. Vincent's (2005–2006) ===
Turner immediately re-joined St. Vincent's upon returning to Ireland and amassed a 42-point effort by late November. On March 25, 2006, Turner scored 38 points to lead St. Vincent's to a 90–79 win over UCC Demons in the Men's Superleague Semi-Final. The following day, Turner had a 34-point effort in leading St. Vincent's to their first Superleague title since 1994 with a 104–74 win over Limerick Lions in the Men's Superleague Final. Turner was subsequently named Most Valuable Player of the finals weekend.

=== Romania and third stint with St. Vincent's (2006–2007) ===
In September 2006, Turner signed with Romanian team CSU Sibiu for the 2006–07 season. However, he parted ways with Sibiu in November and reregistered with St. Vincent's in early December. St Vincent's failed to qualify for the play-offs in 2006–07 after losing to Shamrock Rovers Hoops on March 10. In the 105–95 loss, Turner produced a 39-point game for St Vincent's.

=== Spain (2007–2009) ===
Four days after St Vincent's loss to Shamrock Rovers Hoops, Turner signed with Spanish team Mérida Patrimonio de la Humanita for the rest of the 2006–07 Liga EBA season. He appeared in seven games for Mérida, averaging 15.7 points, 8.1 rebounds and 2.0 steals per game. He later had a two-game stint with Swiss team BBC Nyon in April 2007.

In July 2007, Turner signed with Spanish team HNV-Consmetal for the 2007–08 season. He had a 12-point effort in a preseason game on August 27, but on September 13, he was released by the HNV-Consmetal prior to the start of the regular season. Two months later, he joined Irish team Ballina. He averaged almost 24 points per game in four outings with Ballina but left the team in mid-December in the wake of their cup exit. He subsequently returned to Spain and signed with CB Tíjola of the LEB Bronce. In 20 games for Tíjola in 2007–08, he averaged 17.3 points, 8.1 rebounds, 1.0 assists, 2.1 steals and 1.0 blocks per game.

In August 2008, Turner re-signed with CB Tíjola for the 2008–09 season. In January 2009, Turner helped Tíjola reach the final of the LEB Bronce, but despite a 14-point effort from Turner, Tíjola were defeated 83–73 by Alerta Cantabria. In 34 games during the 2008–09 season, Turner averaged 15.4 points, 8.6 rebounds, 2.4 steals and 1.0 blocks per game.

=== Killester (2009–2017) ===
==== Key to Killester's success ====
In 2009, Turner decided that it was time to make Ireland his and his family's permanent home. He subsequently settled down in Dublin and joined Killester. On January 31, 2010, Turner enjoyed his "sweetest" moment in Irish basketball as he inspired Killester with an MVP performance to help his side to National Cup success after a 94–69 demolition of UCC Demons in the final. The win ensured Turner's long wait for a cup final medal had come to an end and afterwards he admitted his relief after a performance that yielded 29 points. Less than two months later, on March 27, Killester clinched a clean sweep of trophies following their 74–64 season-finale win over UL Eagles to secure the Nivea For Men's SuperLeague title. The Dubliners followed up their National Cup and Regular Season success with another vintage display behind a 27-point outing from Turner.

A year after winning his first National Cup title, Turner guided Killester back to the final in January 2011; however, this time they were outdone by UCD Marian, losing 60–57 despite Turner scoring a team-high 12 points. In March 2017, Turner noted that the 2011 Cup loss to UCD Marian was the biggest regret of his career, saying "After my first cup win with Killester, going on to lose the second one to UCD Marian is probably the biggest regret I have. Not saying that Marian didn't deserve it, but we didn't take Marian seriously enough that year. They punished us for it I guess." Killester redeemed themselves on March 27, 2011, as they defeated Neptune 84–80 in the Nivea For Men's SuperLeague final to win back-to-back titles, with Turner scoring 14 points in the championship decider.

Turner returned to Killester for the 2011–12 season, but the team lost a number of leading players during the offseason and replaced long-time coach Mark Keenan with Darren O'Neill. Turner was instrumental in maintaining the team's challenge in both cup and league competitions during the 2011–12 season, but despite Turner's best efforts, Killester were defeated by Keenan's UL Eagles 97–81 in the SuperLeague quarter-finals.

==== Basketball Ireland boycott ====
In 2012, despite being the proud owner of an Irish passport, Turner was still considered as an American under Basketball Ireland and Superleague regulations. Despite having accumulated over a decade living in Ireland and spending the vast majority of his time in Ireland, being married to an Irish woman and having Irish children, Turner was not allowed to compete in Basketball Ireland competitions as an Irishman. As a result, Turner stood down from his duties with Killester and took on Basketball Ireland's Superleague and its regulation which dictated that he must compete as a foreign player. Turner remained away from the game and Killester for two seasons. During his absence, Killester missed the postseason in 2012–13 but won the league in 2013–14.

With his protest and boycott amounting to nothing, Turner thought he was finished with the league, but then he was part of a team that won a national 3x3 competition and represented Ireland at a European qualifying tournament in Riga in August 2014. Turner said of that experience, "It just sparked me all over again. I realised then, you know what, I really do love basketball, so screw all that, I'll play again."

==== Rounding out his career ====
Turner re-joined Killester for the 2014–15 season and scored a game-high 25 points in their 76–51 season-opening win over DCU Saints on October 4, 2014. Turner appeared in all 18 regular season games for Killester in 2014–15, averaging 23.9 points, 13.4 rebounds, 2.5 assists, 2.0 steals and 1.4 blocks per game. He helped Killester come within two points of reaching the Champions Trophy final and earned Men's Premier League 2015 All-Star Third Pick honors.

In 2015–16, Turner helped Killester come within two points of reaching the National Cup final and guided them to the Champions Trophy final, where they were defeated 82–77 by UCC Demons despite a 13-point effort from Turner. Turner was not only named Player of the Month for February, but also garnered Men's Premier League 2016 All-Star First Pick honors. Turner appeared in all 18 regular season games for Killester in 2015–16, averaging 22.0 points, 14.4 rebounds, 2.1 assists, 2.3 steals and 1.6 blocks per game.

==== Final season ====
Heading into his 17th professional season as a 42-year-old, Turner's game attire was still a black headband, black sleeve, black shoes and black socks—a tradition dating back to his high school days. Turner's original swag was still on display to make him the game's most compelling figure. Turner was captivated as a youth by the audacity of Michigan's Fab Five, basketball's first hip-hop stars. As a teenager, Turner modelled his appearance and game on them, and a quarter of a century on, their attitude and aggression still informed his game. On October 8, 2016, in the third game of the 2016–17 season, Turner rolled back the years with a season-best 45 points to help Killester defeat Moycullen 83–74.

Still considered one of the most athletic guys in the Irish game despite his age, Turner's intensity and determination in 2016–17 was spurred on by Killester's National Cup semi-final defeat to eventual winners Templeogue in January 2016. It served as a powerful motivator and he was determined to upset the odds once again. And so it was, on January 7, 2017, Turner amassed a staggering 28 rebounds and 15 points that helped his team to a memorable and unexpected 81–69 win over UCD Marian in the Men's National Cup semi-final. He was carried off following a knee injury with 3:33 remaining in the third quarter but after intense treatment returned to the action two minutes into the fourth quarter. Not many pundits gave Killester a chance of toppling UCD Marian, as Marian had defeated Killester in league competition earlier in the season. After the game, Turner was proud in the manner his teammates approached the game, saying "I am not surprised no one gave us a glimmer but as a team we knew what was needed to defeat this very talented side." Killester went on to lose in the National Cup final to Swords Thunder on January 28, as they were heavily defeated 72–51 despite Turner's 12 points and game-high 16 rebounds.

On March 18, 2017, Turner played his final game in the Irish League. Fittingly, Killester matched-up against DCU Saints in the regular-season finale, giving Turner the proper send off amongst the two teams he had accomplished so much with. Turner bid farewell to Irish basketball with a 35-point effort in what was an 83–62 win for Killester. Killester finished the season in fifth position with a 13–9 record, and thus missed out on qualifying for the Champions Trophy tournament. Turner appeared in all 22 regular season games for Killester in 2016–17, averaging 21.6 points, 12.8 rebounds, 2.1 assists, 2.1 steals and 1.6 blocks per game. He was subsequently named to the Men's Super League All-Star First Team.

== Post-playing career ==
In April 2017, Turner moved back to the United States and settled in Pittsburgh, Pennsylvania. His family moved over and joined him that summer after his eldest daughter finished school in Dublin.

Every summer between 2009 and 2016, Turner was a guest coach with Pete Strobl's Pittsburgh-based basketball academy The Scoring Factory. Turner and Strobl briefly played alongside each other with Ballina in 2007. Turner joined the staff on a full-time basis in the spring of 2017 following the conclusion of his playing career.

For the 2017–18 season, Turner served as an assistant coach for the Chatham University men's basketball team. For the 2018–19 season, he served as an assistant coach for the Carnegie Mellon University men's basketball team. He was still on the Carnegie Mellon coaching staff as of July 2023.

== Personal life ==
Turner and his Irish wife, Leesa, have three daughters. The couple met in Dublin in 2003. Leesa (née Grennell) is a member of one of Irish basketball's great families; a daughter of Martin, a sister of Johnny, and a fine player in her own right for the Killester women's team.

During his career, Turner would often pretend to rip open the front of his top when celebrating, a la Superman, a nickname Ron Artest would call him when they played together on the playgrounds of New York in the 1990s.
