= Jonction Basket =

Jonction Basket was a professional basketball club based in Geneva, Switzerland.

== History ==
The club became one of the major powers in the 50s Swiss Basketball League (so called Championnat LNA)when it won six champion titles in a row from 1953 to 1958.

== Honours ==
=== Domestic competitions ===
- Swiss League

Winners (6): 1952–53, 1953–54, 1954–55, 1955–56, 1956–57, 1957–58

=== European competitions ===
- Latin Cup

4th place (1): 1953
