= Ed Klimkowski =

College basketball player (1969–1969) St. Bonaventure

Edward Klimkowski is a retired American professional basketball coach and player.

== Career ==
A 6’2’’ forward, Klimkowski played basketball at Power Memorial Academy (class of 1967) as a teammate of Lew Alcindor. Collegiately Klimkowski played for the St. Bonaventure University men's basketball team before transferring to C.W. Post. He was a member of the C.W. Post men's basketball team from 1970 to 1972.

In 1972, Klimkowski kicked off his career in professional basketball as a player-coach at Solna IF of Sweden. Under his guidance, Solna won the 1973 Swedish national championship and subsequently played in the FIBA European Champions' Cup during the 1973–74 season. In the first round of the European competition, his Solna team defeated English Epping Avenue BC Leyton, Klimkowski scored 30 points each in the home- and the away-game. His team was defeated by KK Radnički Belgrade in the following round. In the Swedish league, he guided Solna IF to runner-up spots in 1973 and 1974. In 1974, he retired as a player, focussing on his coaching duties. He parted ways with Solna IF in 1977.

From 1977 to 1980, Klimkowski served as head coach of Fribourg Olympic, winning the Swiss national championship in 1978 and 1979 as well as the national cup competition in 1978. In the 1980–81 season, he was head coach of Ferrarelle Rieti in Italy's top-tier Serie A and the Korać Cup. Klimkowski left Rieti in 1981, returning to the US.
