= SAV Vacallo Basket =

SAV Vacallo Basket is a professional basketball club based in Vacallo, Switzerland. The club has previously played in both the Swiss LNA and LNB divisions.

== Honours ==
- Swiss Basketball League: (1)

2009

- Swiss Basketball Cup: (4)

1999, 2000, 2008, 2009

- LNB Championship: (1)

2005

== Notable players ==
- (Greece) Georgios Diamantopoulos
- (Greece) Michalis Kakiouzis
- (United States) Larry O'Bannon
- (United States) Jermaine Turner
