= BC Winterthur =

- Leagues: Swiss Basketball League; NLB Women
- Arena: Neuhegi (and Rennweg)
- Location: Winterthur, Switzerland
- President: Sandra Hofstetter
- Team manager: Samuel Frey
- Head coach: Daniel Rasljic
- Championships: 1 NLB Women: 2022; 2 Swiss Cup Women: 2017, 2019
- Website: www.bcwinterthur.ch
Home	Away

Basketballclub Winterthur is a Swiss professional basketball club based in Winterthur. Since the 2013–14 season, the team plays in the Swiss Basketball League (SBL), the top-tier league in Switzerland. The club has 11 teams in various leagues for both males and females. The BC Winterthur women's team plays in the Swiss NLB Women league, the second-tier of women's professional basketball in Switzerland.
