= Pully Lausanne Foxes =

- Leagues: Swiss Basketball League
- Founded: 1951; 75 years ago
- History: Pully Basket; 1951–2017; Pully Lausanne Foxes; 2017–present
- Arena: Salle Omnisport Arnold Reymond
- Capacity: 1,500
- Location: Pully, Switzerland
- Championships: 4 Swiss Leagues; 5 Swiss Cups
- Website: www.foxesbasketball.ch
Home	Away

Pully Lausanne Foxes is a Swiss professional basketball club that is based in Pully. The team currently plays in the Swiss Basketball League (SBL), the highest basketball tier in Switzerland. Until 2017, the club was known as Pully Basket.

== History ==
The club was founded on December 4, 1951, by Frenchman, Neil 'Pinto' Hernandez. The first club colors was green for the shirt and red for shorts. In 1962 Pully became winner of the Vaud Cup, also the club rises at LNB second level championship in Switzerland. After a remarkable 1966–67 season, Pully promoted to LNA through the streets of his city Sunday, June 25, and he was welcomed by the municipality. In 1967-68 Pully ranks fourth at the LNA championship, and the club has 88 members, including 47 juniors, making it the first club in Switzerland by the number of members. Four years late (1971–72) after the departure of several experienced players, Pully drops back to LNB after a season with 18 games and 0 points.

In 1974-75 Pully earns the title of Swiss champion LNB and goes back to LNA. The summer of 1982, Gary Lawrence named the new coach of Pully Basket. He was a former player who played with the club when he came to the elite league of Switzerland. During that year, The Pully basketball participated in the 1982–83 FIBA Korać Cup. Its opponent in the first phase was Sparta Bertrange from Luxembourg and in the second the Yugoslavs of Zadar.

The Pully Basket logo, used until 2017

The first national league title came in 1986 and followed by one more the next year (1976–87). Also the 1986–87 season Pully Basket take part for the first time in its history at the FIBA European Champions Cup. The club eliminated in the first round with two straight defeats by the beyond finalist Maccabi Tel Aviv. The next season Pully qualified the first round with two wins against Klosterneuburg but in the second phase has not been able to overcome the obstacle of Aris and to qualified in the quarter-finals group stage. In 1988-89 Pully won its first double in the domestic competitions. The second double came the next season (1989–90). Aa Swiss champion Pully participated in the 1990-91 FIBA European Champions Cup and achieved the biggest win in its all history against Maccabi Tel Aviv with 95–92 score. The defeat by 34 Points in Yad Eliyahu Arena rematch extinguished any hope of qualification for the next phase. The same year came and the third consecutive national cup title. In 1991-92 Pully won once again the Swiss cup. The last participation in a league final was in 1997. After one season the club relegated to the LNB, because of financial difficulties and during the season changed its policy and decides to financial reform and reorganize the youth department.

== Arena ==
Pully Basket plays its home games at the Salle Omnisport Arnold Reymond arena, which has a seating capacity of 1,500 people.

== Honours and titles ==
Swiss League

- Winners (4): 1985–86, 1986–87, 1988–89, 1989–90

Swiss Cup

- Winners (5): 1987–88, 1988–89, 1989–90, 1990–91, 1991–92
