= BBC Lausanne =

BBC Lausanne (Basket Ball Club Lausanne) is a Swiss basketball club from Lausanne.

== History ==
The club was founded on November 25, 1929 under the name L'epi sport Lausanne and was the first basketball club in the city. In the 1950s, the name change to Sanas Merry Boys. Since 2010, the club is called BBC Lausanne.

In 2014, the club was in debt. According to the club president in 2016, the club sought a budget between 400,000 and 800,000 Swiss francs to finish the 2016–17 season in the top 6 of the LNA. After completing the first qualifying round, BBC Lausanne took the 6th place.

== Honours ==
- Swiss League

Winners (2): 1951–52, 1963–64

- Swiss Cup

Winners (6): 1945–46, 1954–55, 1955–56, 1956–57, 1958–59, 1962–63
