= Swiss Central Basket =

Swiss Central Basketball
- Nickname: SCB
- Leagues: Swiss Basketball League
- Founded: 2015; 10 years ago
- History: Swiss Central Basket; 2015–present
- Arena: Staffeln Turnhalle
- Capacity: 650
- Location: Luzern, Switzerland
- Main sponsor: CSS Versicherung
- President: Thomas Müller
- Vice-president(s): Angelos Varelis
- Head coach: Orlando Bär
- Team captain: Michael Plüss
- Championships: 2x U16 Swiss Champion, 2x U16 Swiss Cup winners, 3x NLB 2nd place
- Website: www.swisscentralbasketball.ch

Swiss Central Basketball is a Swiss professional basketball club based in Luzern. Founded in 2009, the team currently plays in the Swiss Basketball League (SBL), the top-tier league in Switzerland.

== Notable players ==
- Set a club record or won an individual award as a professional player.
- Played at least one official international match for his senior national team at any time.

- (Switzerland) Toni Rocak
