= Vevey Riviera Basket =

Swiss basketball club

- Nickname: VRB
- Leagues: LNA
- Founded: 1952; 73 years ago
- History: Vevey Basket; 1952–1998; Vevey Riviera Basket; 1998–present
- Arena: Galeries du Rivage
- Capacity: 2,800
- Location: Vevey, Switzerland
- President: Nathan Zana
- Head coach: Ivan Beram
- Team captain: Jonathan Dubas
- Championships: 2 Swiss Championships; 3 Swiss Cups
- Website: www.vevey-basket.ch

Vevey Riviera Basket, also known as Riviera Lakers, is a Swiss basketball club based in Vevey. It plays in the first national tier.

== History ==
The club was founded in 1952 as Vevey Basket. Vevey won the Swiss League championship 2 times, in the years 1984 and 1991. Their first Swiss League championship came under coach Jim Boylan. They also won the Swiss Cup three times, in the years 1983, 1984, and 1985.

Vevey qualified to the Korać Cup for the 1974–75 and 1987–88 seasons. Vevey qualified for the Saporta Cup in the 1983–84 and 1985–86 seasons. Vevey also qualified to the EuroLeague for the 1984–85 season. They also played in the knockout rounds of both the 1991–92 Euroleague and the 1991–92 Saporta Cup. In 1998 Vevey merged with Blonay Basket and change its name to Vevey Riviera Basket.

Thabo Sefolosha began his senior men's club career with Vevey.

== Notable players ==
Note: Flags indicate national team eligibility at FIBA-sanctioned events. Players may hold other non-FIBA nationalities not displayed.

Criteria

To appear in this section a player must have either:

- Set a club record or won an individual award while at the club
- Played at least one official international match for their national team at any time
- Played at least one official NBA match at any time.

- (Switzerland) Thabo Sefolosha (2 seasons: 2001–02, 2022-23 )
- (United States) Jim Boylan
- (United States) Jim Grandholm
- (United States) Dave Angstadt
- (United States) Vince Reynolds
- (United States) Herb Johnson
- (Canada) Wayne Yearwood
- (United States) Brett Beeson
- (United States) Herman Alston
- (United States) Lee Matthews
- (Canada) Dwight Walton
- (Senegal) Babacar Touré
- (Croatia) Bojan Lapov
- (Switzerland) Jonathan Dubas

== Head coaches ==
- Nathan Zana
- Niksa Bavcevic
- Ivan Beram
