= BC Boncourt =

Boncourt
- Nickname: Red Team
- Leagues: Swiss Basketball League
- Founded: 8 May 1980; 45 years ago
- Arena: Le Chaudron
- Location: Boncourt, Switzerland
- Website: bcboncourt.ch

Basket-Club Boncourt is a professional basketball team from Boncourt, Switzerland. The team currently plays in the Swiss Basketball League (SBL). Home games of the team are played in Salle Sportive Boncourt which has a seating capacity of 1,500 people. The club has played in the lower-tier European competitions several times, the last time in 2006–07 in the FIBA EuroCup Challenge.

== Honours ==
- Swiss Basketball League
  - Champions (2): 2002–03, 2003–04
- Swiss Cup: 1
  - Winners (1): 2005
- Swiss Basketball League Cup: 2
  - Winners (2): 2005, 2006

== European history ==
Boncourt made its debut in the European fourth-tier FIBA Europe Cup in the 2003–04 season and consequently would appear in the next three edition as well.

Competition	Participation	Years	Best result
FIBA EuroCup Challenge	4	2003–04, 2004–05, 2005–06, 2006–07	Top 16 (2006)

== Players ==
=== Current roster ===
Note: Flags indicate national team eligibility at FIBA-sanctioned events. Players may hold other non-FIBA nationalities not displayed.

Basket-club Boncourt roster
Players
Coaches

Pos.	No.	Nat.	Name
F	3	(Switzerland)	Voiblet, Cyril
G	4	(Switzerland)	Gredy, Bastien
G/F	6	(Switzerland)	Vertel, Luka
G	9	(Switzerland)	Engondo, Matthieu
PG	10	(Switzerland)	Herrmann, Alexis
G	11	(United States)	Jenkins, Brandon
SF	21	(Ivory Coast)	N'Diaye, Ismael
G	30	(Canada)	Sir, Stephen
SG		(United States)	Edwards, Arthur

Head coach

(France) Antoine Petitjean

Assistant coach(es)

(Switzerland) Davide Madama

Legend

- (C) Team captain
- Injured

- Roster
Updated: 20 February 2015

=== Notable players ===
Note: Flags indicate national team eligibility at FIBA-sanctioned events. Players may hold other non-FIBA nationalities not displayed.

Criteria

To appear in this section a player must have either:

- Set a club record or won an individual award while at the club
- Played at least one official international match for their national team at any time
- Played at least one official NBA match at any time.

- (Switzerland) Roman Albrecht
- (Switzerland) Sebastien Borter
- (Switzerland) Nemanja Calasan
- (Switzerland) Nicolas Dos Santos
- (Serbia) Ivica Radosavljević
- (United States) Erroyl Bing
- (United States) Shyron Ely
