= BBC Monthey-Chablais =

- Leagues: Swiss Basketball League
- Founded: 29 September 1966; 59 years ago
- History: BBC Monthey; 1966–2018; BBC Monthey-Chablais; 2018–present
- Arena: Reposieux
- Capacity: 600
- Location: Monthey, Switzerland
- Team colors: Yellow and Green
- Head coach: Patrick Pebble
- Championships: 3 Swiss Championships
- Website: bbcmonthey.ch

BBC Monthey-Chablais is a Swiss professional basketball team based in Monthey. The team currently plays in the Swiss Ligue Nationale de Basketball. The team has won the Swiss championships three times, in 1996, 2005 and 2017.

In July 2018, the club changed its name from BBC Monthey to BBC Monthey-Chablais.

== Trophies ==
- Swiss Basketball League
  - Winners (3): 1995–96, 2004–05, 2016–17
- Swiss Cup
  - Winners (2): 2003, 2006
- Swiss Basketball League Cup
  - Winners (2): 2016, 2017

== Players ==
=== Current roster ===
Note: Flags indicate national team eligibility at FIBA-sanctioned events. Players may hold other non-FIBA nationalities not displayed.

BBC Monthey roster
Players
Coaches

Pos.	No.	Nat.	Name
G	0	(United States)	JaCori Payne
G	2	(Switzerland)	Marlon Kessler
F	4	(United States)	Jalen Hayes
PG	5	(Switzerland)	Jamal George
SG	6	(Switzerland)	Thomas Fritschi
SG	11	(Switzerland)	Thomas Salman
F	13	(Switzerland)	Brunell Tutonda
G	14	(Switzerland)	Maxime Rentsch
F/C	23	(United States)	Kevin Langford
F	33	(United States)	Tristan Von Nieda

Head coach

(Switzerland) (Democratic Republic of the Congo) Patrick Pembele

Legend

- (C) Team captain
- Injured

- Roster
Updated: 23 June 2022

=== Notable players ===
- Set a club record or won an individual award as a professional player.
- Played at least one official international match for his senior national team at any time.

- (Switzerland) Jonathan Dubas
- (Switzerland) Marko Mladjan
- (England) Ryan Richards (2010)
- (Guam) Jonathan Galloway
- (Nigeria) Mike Efevberha
- (Serbia) Marko Djurkovic
- (United States) Drew Neitzel (2012–13)
- (United States) Arizona Reid
- (United States) Doug Thomas (2006–07)
- (United States) Chad Timberlake
