= Lions de Genève =

- Leagues: Swiss Basketball League; NLB Women; Europe Cup
- Founded: 2000; 26 years ago
- History: Genève Devils; 2000–2010; Lions de Genève; 2010–present
- Arena: Pavilion des Sports
- Capacity: 2,000
- Location: Geneva, Switzerland
- Head coach: Alain Attalah
- Championships: 2 Swiss Championship; 4 Swiss Cup; 3 League Cup
- Website: www.lionsdegeneve.ch
Home	Away

The Lions de Genève are a professional basketball club based in the city of Geneva, Switzerland. The Lions currently play in the Swiss top-tier Swiss Basketball League (SBL). The team is based in the 2,000 capacity Pavillon des Sports. The women's team plays in the Swiss NLB Women league, the second-tier of women's professional basketball in Switzerland.

== History ==
Founded as the Genève Devils in the summer of 2000, the club rebranded itself as Les Lions de Genève in 2010 after merging with Meyrin Grand-Saconnex.

== Trophies ==
Total trophies: 11

- Swiss Basketball League (3):

2012–13, 2014–15, 2024–25

- Swiss Cup (4):

2003–04, 2013–14, 2016–17, 2020–21

- SBL Cup (5):

2003–04, 2012–13, 2014–15, 2019, 2021

== Current roster ==
Note: Flags indicate national team eligibility at FIBA-sanctioned events. Players may hold other non-FIBA nationalities not displayed.

Lions de Genève roster
Players
Coaches

Pos.	No.	Nat.	Name
SG	1	(Greece)	Dimitrios Klonaras
PG	2	(United States)	Ty Johnson
F	7	(United States)	Isaiah Williams
F	8	(Switzerland)	Jahlen Joly
G/F	12	(Switzerland)	Thomas Jurkovitz
PG	14	(United States)	Corey Floyd Jr.
F	16	(Switzerland)	Omar Ali
SG	17	(Switzerland) (Tunisia)	Chabouh, Mohamed
C	19	(Switzerland) (France)	Noe Anabir
PG	21	(Switzerland)	Yuri Solca
SG	22	(Switzerland)	Zaid Weibel
PF	33	(United States)	Juwann James
PF	34	(United States)	Kalu, Kevin

Head coach

(Croatia) Andrej Štimac

Assistant coach(es)

(Croatia) Ivan Stanisak

Legend

- (C) Team captain
- Injured

- Roster
Updated: 28 April 2026

== Notable players ==
To appear in this section a player must have played at least two seasons for the club AND either:

– Set a club record or won an individual award as a professional player.
– Played at least one official international match for his senior national team at any time.

- (Switzerland) Arnaud Cotture
- (Switzerland) Jeremy Jaunin
- (Switzerland) Roberto Kovac
- (Switzerland) Dusan Mladjan
- (Switzerland) Marko Mladjan
- (Switzerland) David Ramseyer
- (Switzerland) Julien Senderos
- (Croatia) Andrej Štimac
- (Israel) Alon Stein
- (United States) Shawn Jamison
- (United States) Arizona Reid

== Head coaches ==
- (Central African Republic) Rodrigue M'Baye
- (Croatia) Ivan Rudež
- (Belgium) Jean-Marc Jaumin: (2016–2017)
- (Bosnia and Herzegovina) Vedran Bosnić: (2017–2019)
- (Croatia) Andrej Štimac: (2020–2022)
- (Egypt) Alain Attalah: (2022–2023)
- Dragan Andrejevic (2022-Present
