= Union Neuchâtel =

- Leagues: Swiss Basketball League
- Founded: 1959; 67 years ago
- Arena: La Riveraine
- Capacity: 2,500
- Location: Neuchâtel, Switzerland
- Main sponsor: Tissot
- President: Andrea Siviero
- Head coach: Mitar Tritunovic
- Championships: 1 Swiss Cup
- Website: unionbasket.ch
Home	Away

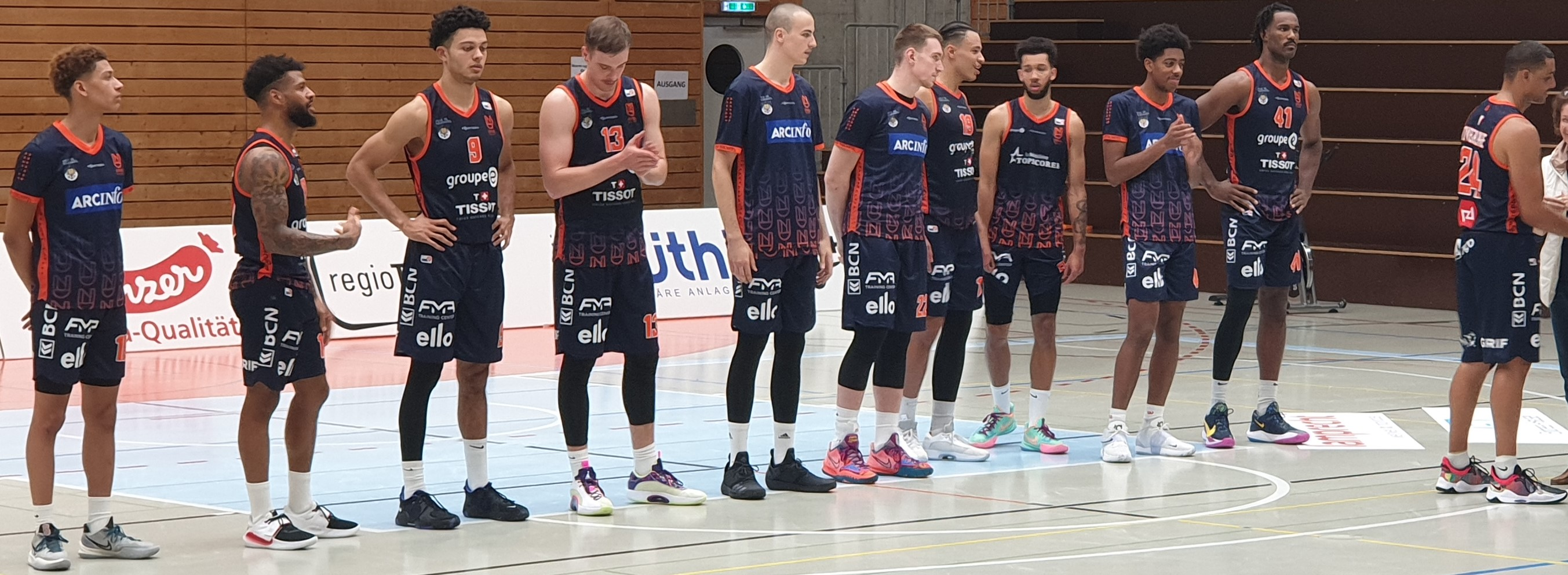
Union Neuchâtel in October 2021.

Union Neuchâtel team bus in October 2021.

Union Neuchâtel Basket, commonly known as Union Neuchâtel, is a Swiss professional basketball club based in Neuchâtel. It plays in the Swiss Basketball League (SBL), the top tier basketball division in Switzerland. The club has won one trophy, the Swiss Cup in 2013.

== Honours ==
- Swiss Basketball Cup
  - Champions (1): 2013
- Swiss Basketball League Cup
  - Winners (1): 2014

== Current roster ==
Note: Flags indicate national team eligibility at FIBA-sanctioned events. Players may hold other non-FIBA nationalities not displayed.

Union Neuchâtel roster
Players
Coaches

Pos.	No.	Nat.	Name
F	0	(United States)	Dalan Ancrum
G	2	(Angola)	Silmy Caputo
PG	3	(United States)	Nate West
F	4	(Switzerland)	Jonathan Graeser
G	5	(France)	Joanis Maquiesse
F/C	8	(Switzerland)	Saban Mehic
C	9	(Grenada)	Arkim Robertson
PG	10	(Switzerland)	Henri Chokote
C	12	(Switzerland)	Nikola Damjanovic
F	13	(Switzerland)	Killian Martin
C	17	(Switzerland)	Vigdon Memishi
G/F	73	(Argentina)	Juan De La Fuente

Head coach

(Serbia) Mitar Trivunovic

Assistant coach(es)

(United States) Chad Timberlake

Legend

- (C) Team captain
- Injured

- Roster
Updated: December 17, 2022

== Notable players ==
Note: Flags indicate national team eligibility at FIBA-sanctioned events. Players may hold other non-FIBA nationalities not displayed.

Criteria

To appear in this section a player must have either:

- Set a club record or won an individual award while at the club
- Played at least one official international match for their national team at any time
- Played at least one official NBA match at any time.

- (Switzerland) Noe Anabir
- (Switzerland) Evrard Atcho
- (Switzerland) Frederic Barman
- (Switzerland) Bryan Conlon
- (Switzerland) Selim Fofana
- (Switzerland) Yoan Granvorka
- (Switzerland) Brian Savoy
- (Switzerland) Florian Steinmann
- (Senegal) Jules Aw
- (Senegal) Pape Badji
- (Senegal) Babacar Toure
- (Serbia) Ivica Radosavljević
- (Tunisia) Mohamed Ben Hassen
- (United States) David Bell
- (United States) Tony Brown
- (United States) Antonio Ballard
- (United States) Quinton Day
- (United States) Marquis Jackson
- (United States) Dom Morris
- (United States) James Padgett
- (United States) Chad Timberlake
