= SAM Basket Massagno =

SAM Massagno
- Leagues: Swiss Basketball League
- Founded: 1964; 62 years ago
- Arena: Palestra di Nosedo
- Capacity: 1,000
- Location: Massagno, Switzerland
- President: Fabio Regazzi
- Vice-president: Patrick Manzan
- Team manager: Robbi Gubitosa
- Head coach: Alain Attallah
- Championships: 1 Swiss Cup; 1 Swiss Supercup
- Website: sambasketmassagno.com
Home	Away

SAM Basket Massagno, for sponsorship reasons A++ Massagno, is a professional basketball club based in Massagno, Switzerland. The team currently plays in the Swiss Basketball League, the highest professional division in Switzerland. The team plays its home games at the palestra di Nosedo (SEM Nosedo), which has a capacity of 1,000 people.

SAM has won two trophies in its history, the national SBL Cup in 2023 and the SBL Supercup in 2024.

== Honours ==
SBL Cup

- Winners (1): 2022–23
- Runners-up (2): 2019, 2021

SBL Supercup

- Winners (1): 2023–24

== Notable players ==
Note: Flags indicate national team eligibility at FIBA-sanctioned events. Players may hold other non-FIBA nationalities not displayed.

Criteria

To appear in this section a player must have either:

- Set a club record or won an individual award while at the club
- Played at least one official international match for their national team at any time
- Played at least one official NBA match at any time.

- (Switzerland) Dusan Mladjan
- (Switzerland) Marko Mlađan
- (Kenya) Tylor Ongwae
- (Senegal) Abdou Badji
- (Slovenia) Uroš Slokar
- (United States) Tony Gugino
- (United States) Clint Chapman
