= Fribourg Olympic Basket =

Fribourg Olympic
- Leagues: Swiss Basketball League; Europe Cup
- Founded: 27 April 1961; 65 years ago
- Arena: Salle Saint-Léonard
- Capacity: 2,850
- Location: Fribourg, Switzerland
- President: Philippe de Gottrau
- Head coach: Thibaut Petit
- 2023–24 position: SBL, 1st of 12
- Championships: Swiss League (22); Swiss Cup (13); Swiss League Cup (9)
- Website: fribourg-olympic.ch
Home	Away

Fribourg Olympic Basket, commonly known as Fribourg Olympic, is a Swiss professional basketball club that is based in Fribourg. Due to name sponsorship reasons, the former name of the club was Benetton Fribourg. The club is a seventeen-time Swiss Basketball League champion.

== History ==
Fribourg Olympic competed in seven seasons of the original version of the EuroLeague, the top-level European competition, when it was run by FIBA, due to being the Swiss League champions. In all those seasons, the club only qualified two times for the competition's second round, by winning their previous series. In 2007, Fribourg Olympic competed in the European-wide secondary competition, the 2007–08 ULEB Cup regular season, but they ended up in the last position of their group.

In the 2015–16 season, Fribourg won its first Swiss Basketball League (SBL) title in eight years. In the 2017–18 season, Fribourg won its seventeenth Swiss national title. Following that domestic title, the club made its debut in the qualifying rounds of the European secondary level FIBA Basketball Champions League (BCL). On 4 October 2018, they eventually qualified to the competition's regular season phase, after winning three successive qualifying rounds against Avtodor Saratov, Donar, and Sakarya.

== Arena ==
Fribourg Olympic plays its home games at the Salle Saint-Léonard arena, which has a seating capacity of 2,850 people.

== Honours and titles ==
Swiss Basketball League

- Champions (22): 1966, 1971, 1973, 1974, 1978, 1979, 1981, 1982, 1985, 1992, 1997, 1998, 1999, 2007, 2008, 2016, 2018, 2019, 2021, 2022, 2023, 2024
  - Runners-up (17): 1965, 1967, 1968, 1969, 1972, 1976, 1977, 1983, 1989, 1994, 1995, 1996, 2002, 2003, 2004, 2010, 2011

Swiss Cup

- Winners (13): 1967, 1976, 1978, 1997, 1998, 2007, 2016, 2018, 2019, 2022, 2023, 2024, 2026

Swiss League Cup

- Winners (9): 2007, 2008, 2009, 2010, 2018, 2020, 2022, 2024, 2025

== Roster ==
Note: Flags indicate national team eligibility at FIBA-sanctioned events. Players may hold other non-FIBA nationalities not displayed.

Fribourg Olympic roster
Players
Coaches

Pos.	No.	Nat.	Name
PG	1	(Dominican Republic)	Colon, Bryan	1.81 m (5 ft 11 in)	34 – 17 February 1992
PG	2	(United States)	Lykes, Chris	1.70 m (5 ft 7 in)	28 – 22 July 1998
SF	3	(Switzerland)	Eyenga, Philippe	1.90 m (6 ft 3 in)	27 – 10 July 1999
SG	4	(Switzerland)	Kupa, Emmanuel	1.92 m (6 ft 4 in)	20 – 11 January 2006
G	7	(Switzerland)	Bernegger, Simon	1.83 m (6 ft 0 in)	19 – 27 January 2007
SG	12	(Switzerland)	Dell'Acqua, Massimiliano	1.90 m (6 ft 3 in)	23 – 12 June 2003
PF	13	(Switzerland)	Martina, Kevin	2.03 m (6 ft 8 in)	25 – 14 April 2001
G	18	(Switzerland) (Cameroon)	Mbala, Boris	1.90 m (6 ft 3 in)	30 – 19 January 1996
C	19	(France)	Le Meut, Izan	2.14 m (7 ft 0 in)	22 – 27 May 2004
PF	20	(Switzerland)	Cotture, Arnaud	2.03 m (6 ft 8 in)	31 – 9 August 1995
F	24	(France)	Moerman, Adrien	2.06 m (6 ft 9 in)	38 – 7 August 1988
PF	99	(Switzerland)	Jurkovitz, Natan	2.02 m (6 ft 8 in)	31 – 4 April 1995

Head coach

- (Belgium) Thibaut Petit

Assistant coach(es)

- (Israel) Aner Lev Ron
- (Canada) Emerson Thomas

Legend

- (C) Team captain
- Injured

- Roster
Updated: March 13, 2025

== Notable players ==
Note: Flags indicate national team eligibility at FIBA-sanctioned events. Players may hold other non-FIBA nationalities not displayed.

Criteria

To appear in this section a player must have either:

- Set a club record or won an individual award while at the club
- Played at least one official international match for their national team at any time
- Played at least one official NBA match at any time.

- (Switzerland) Vladimir Buscaglia
- (Switzerland) Arnaud Cotture
- (Switzerland) Eric Fongue
- (Switzerland) Jérémy Jaunin
- (Switzerland) Jonathan Kazadi
- (Switzerland) Roberto Kovac
- (Switzerland) Kevin Madiamba
- (Switzerland) Vigdon Memishi
- (Switzerland) Marko Mladan
- (Switzerland) Westher Molteni
- (Switzerland) Florian Steinmann
- (Switzerland) Oliver Vogt
- (Switzerland) Robert Zinn
- (Finland) Ville Kaunisto
- (Senegal) Babacar Touré
- (United States) Greg Howard
- (United States) Arizona Reid
- (United States) Chad Timberlake
- (United States) Cornell Warner
- (United States) Derek Wright
- (United States) Clint Chapman
- (United States) Ken Johnson

== Head coaches ==
- Ed Klimkowski
- Petar Aleksic
