= Lugano Tigers =

- Leagues: Swiss Basketball League
- Founded: 1981; 44 years ago
- History: FV Lugano; 1981–1999; Lugano Snakes; 1999–2003; Lugano Tigers; 2003–present
- Arena: Istituto Elvetico
- Capacity: 1,000
- Location: Lugano, Switzerland
- President: Alessandro Cedraschi
- Vice-president(s): Riccardo Braglia
- Head coach: Jean-Marc Jaumin
- Championships: 6 LNBA; 4 Swiss Cups; 1 League Cup
- Website: Official website
Home	Away

The Lugano Tigers are a Swiss professional basketball club that is based in Lugano, Switzerland. The club competes in the Swiss Basketball League (SBL), the highest domestic tier. Founded as FN Lugano, the team was re-named to Lugano Snakes in 1999 and to its current name in 2003.

== History ==
Founded in 1981, with the merging of Federal Lugano and AS Viganello, FV Lugano won the first Swiss Cup in 1982. In 1999, FV Lugano became the Lugano Snakes, the Snakes would go on to win three Swiss League championships, two Swiss Cups, and appear in the 2000-2001 EuroLeague. In 2003, financial failure would see the Snakes become the Tigers. Lugano Tigers would go on to win the Swiss League championship in 2006, and finish in second place in the next two seasons, before winning the Swiss League championship again in 2010. During the 2010–11 season, the Tigers would play in the 2010–11 FIBA EuroChallenge tournament, on their way to winning the Swiss national championship, Swiss Cup, and the Swiss League Cup.

== Honours ==
Former logo of the club.

- Swiss Basketball League: 8

2000, 2001, 2002, 2006, 2010, 2011, 2012, 2014

- Swiss Cup: 4

1982, 2001, 2002, 2011

- League Cup: 2

2011, 2012

== European history ==
Boncourt made its debut in the European fourth-tier FIBA Europe Cup in the 2003–04 season and consequently would appear in the next three edition as well.

Tier	Competition	Participation	Years	Best result
I	EuroLeague	2	2000–01, 2001–02	Regular season (2x)
II	Saporta Cup (Note: Or its successor, the FIBA European Cup Winners' Cup)	2	1982–83, 2001–02	
III	EuroChallenge (Note: Or its successor, the FIBA Korać Cup.)	4	1993–94, 1998–99, 1999–2000, 2010–11	Third round (2000)

== Notable players ==
Note: Flags indicate national team eligibility at FIBA-sanctioned events. Players may hold other non-FIBA nationalities not displayed.

Criteria

To appear in this section a player must have either:

- Set a club record or won an individual award while at the club
- Played at least one official international match for their national team at any time
- Played at least one official NBA match at any time.

- (Switzerland) Dušan Mlađan
- (Switzerland) Derek Stockalper
- (Switzerland) Christophe Varidel
- (Israel) Alon Stein
- (Nigeria) Michael Efevberha
- (United States) Todd Mitchell
- (United States) Travis Walton
- (United States) Travis Watson

== Head coaches ==
- (Switzerland) Gianluca Barilari
