= Swiss Basketball League =

Top basketball league in Switzerland

SB League
- Founded: 1931; 95 years ago
- First season: 1931–32
- Country: Switzerland
- Confederation: FIBA Europe
- Number of teams: 9
- Level on pyramid: 1
- Relegation to: LNB
- Domestic cup(s): Swiss Cup; SBL Cup
- International cup(s): Champions League; FIBA Europe Cup
- Current champions: Fribourg Olympic (22nd title) (2025–26)
- Most championships: Fribourg Olympic (22 titles)
- Website: Link
- 2025–26 Swiss Basketball League

The Swiss Basketball League, also known as SB League or SBL, is the top-tier professional club basketball league in Switzerland. It is organized by Swiss Basketball. The winners of the SBL are crowned Swiss national basketball champions. Currently, twelve teams compete in the league. Historically, Fribourg Olympic is the league's most successful team, as it has won a league-record 19 championships. Until 2017, the league was known as the Championnat LNA.

== Promotion and relegation ==
The national professional club basketball competition of Switzerland is divided into two separate league levels, the top-tier level SBL, and the 2nd-tier level LNB, with a system of promotion and relegation between the two league levels.

== Current teams ==
Current teams as of the 2024-25 season:

Clubs of the SBL 2024-25

Team	Location
Fribourg Olympic	Fribourg
Lions de Genève	Geneva
Pully	Pully
Union Neuchâtel	Neuchâtel
Nyon	Nyon
Spinelli Massagno	Massagno
Monthey-Chablais	Monthey
Starwings Basket	Basel
Lugano Tigers	Lugano

== Champions ==
- 1931–32 Uni Bern
- 1932–33 Servette
- 1933–34 Urania Genève
- 1934–35 Servette
- 1935–36 Servette
- 1936–37 Genève
- 1937–38 Urania Genève
- 1938–40 Not held
- 1940–41 Urania Genève
- 1941–42 Urania Genève
- 1942–43 Urania Genève
- 1943–44 Urania Genève
- 1944–45 CAG Genève
- 1945–46 Urania Genève
- 1946–47 Urania Genève
- 1947–48 Urania Genève
- 1948–49 Urania Genève
- 1949–50 Stade Français Genève
- 1950–51 Sanas Merry Boys
- 1951–52 Jonction
- 1952–53 Jonction
- 1953–54 Jonction
- 1954–55 Jonction
- 1955–56 Jonction
- 1956–57 Jonction
- 1957–58 Urania Genève
- 1958–59 Urania Genève
- 1959–60 Stade Français Genève
- 1960–61 Not held
- 1961–62 Stade Français Genève
- 1962–63 Sanas Merry Boys
- 1963–64 Urania Genève
- 1964–65 Urania Genève
- 1965–66 Fribourg Olympic
- 1966–67 Urania Genève
- 1967–68 Stade Français Genève
- 1968–69 Stade Français Genève
- 1969–70 Stade Français Genève
- 1970–71 Fribourg Olympic
- 1971–72 Stade Français Genève
- 1972–73 Fribourg Olympic
- 1973–74 Fribourg Olympic
- 1974–75 Federale
- 1975–76 Federale
- 1976–77 Federale
- 1977–78 Fribourg Olympic
- 1978–79 Fribourg Olympic
- 1979–80 Viganello
- 1980–81 Fribourg Olympic
- 1981–82 Fribourg Olympic
- 1982–83 Nyon
- 1983–84 Vevey
- 1984–85 Fribourg Olympic
- 1985–86 Pully
- 1986–87 Pully
- 1987–88 Champel Genève
- 1988–89 Pully
- 1989–90 Pully
- 1990–91 Vevey
- 1991–92 Fribourg Olympic
- 1992–93 Fidefinanz Bellinzona
- 1993–94 Fidefinanz Bellinzona
- 1994–95 Fidefinanz Bellinzona
- 1995–96 Monthey
- 1996–97 Benetton Fribourg Olympic
- 1997–98 Benetton Fribourg Olympic
- 1998–99 Benetton Fribourg Olympic
- 1999–00 Lugano Tigers
- 2000–01 Lugano Tigers
- 2001–02 Lugano Tigers
- 2002–03 Boncourt
- 2003–04 Boncourt
- 2004–05 Monthey
- 2005–06 Lugano Tigers
- 2006–07 Benetton Fribourg Olympic
- 2007–08 Benetton Fribourg Olympic
- 2008–09 Vacallo
- 2009–10 Lugano Tigers
- 2010–11 Lugano Tigers
- 2011–12 Lugano Tigers
- 2012–13 Lions de Genève
- 2013–14 Lugano Tigers
- 2014–15 Lions de Genève
- 2015–16 Fribourg Olympic
- 2016–17 Monthey
- 2017–18 Fribourg Olympic
- 2018–19 Fribourg Olympic
- 2019–20 season cancelled due to coronavirus pandemic
- 2020–21 Fribourg Olympic
- 2021–22 Fribourg Olympic
- 2022–23 Fribourg Olympic
- 2023–24 Fribourg Olympic
- 2024–25 Lions de Genève
- 2025–26 Fribourg Olympic

== Performance by club ==
Club	Winners	Championship seasons
**Fribourg Olympic**	22	1965–66, 1970–71, 1972–73, 1973–74, 1977–78, 1978–79, 1980–81, 1981–82, 1984–85, 1991–92, 1996–97, 1997–98, 1998–99, 2006–07, 2007–08, 2015–16, 2017–18, 2018–19, 2020–21, 2021–22, 2022–23, 2023–24, 2025–26
Urania Genève	15	1933–34, 1937–38, 1940–41, 1941–42, 1942–43, 1943–44, 1945–46, 1946–47, 1947–48, 1948–49, 1957–58, 1958–59, 1963–64, 1964–65, 1966–67
**Lugano Tigers**	8	1999–2000, 2000–01, 2001–02, 2005–06, 2009–10, 2010–11, 2011–12, 2013–14
Stade Français Genève	7	1949–50, 1959–60, 1961–62, 1967–68, 1968–69, 1969–70, 1971–72
Jonction	6	1951–52, 1952–53, 1953–54, 1954–55, 1955–56, 1956–57
**Pully**	4	1985–86, 1986–87, 1988–89, 1989–90
**BBC Monthey**	3	1995–96, 2004–05, 2016–17
Bellinzona	3	1992–93, 1993–94, 1994–95
Federale	3	1974–75, 1975–76, 1976–77
Servette	3	1932–33, 1934–35, 1935–36
**Lions de Genève**	3	2012–13, 2014–15, 2024–25
**BC Boncourt**	2	2002–03, 2003–04
Sanas Merry Boys / BBC Lausanne	2	1950–51, 1962–63
**Vevey Basket**	2	1983–84, 1990–91
Vacallo	1	2008–09
Champel Genève Basket	1	1987–88
Nyon	1	1982–83
Viganello	1	1979–80
CAG Genève	1	1945–46
Genève	1	1936–37
Uni Bern	1	1931–32

Bold indicates clubs which will play in the 2018–19 Swiss Basketball League.

=== Performance by canton ===
Rank	Canton	Titles	Winning clubs
1	Geneva	37	Urania Genève (15), Stade Français Genève (7), Jonction (6), Servette (3), Lions de Genève (3), Champel Genève (1), CAG Genève (1), Genève Basket (1)
2	Fribourg	22	Fribourg Olympic (22)
3	Ticino	16	Lugano Tigers (8), Bellinzona (3), Federale (3), Vacallo (1), Viganello (1)
4	Vaud	9	Pully (4), Sanas Merry Boys / BBC Lausanne (2), Vevey (2), Nyon (1)
5	Valais	3	Monthey (3)
6	Jura	2	Boncourt (2)
7	Bern	1	Uni Bern (1)

== See also ==
- Swiss Basketball Cup (Federation Cup)
- Swiss Basketball League Cup (League Cup)
