= 1999–2000 FIBA Korać Cup =

- League: FIBA Korać Cup
- Sport: Basketball

Finals
- Champions: (France) Limoges CSP
- Runners-up: (Spain) Unicaja

FIBA Korać Cup seasons
- ← 1998–99 2000–01 →

The 1999–2000 FIBA Korać Cup was the 29th edition of FIBA's Korać Cup basketball competition. The French Limoges CSP defeated the Spanish Unicaja in the final. This was Limoges' third time winning the title following victories in 1982 and 1983.

== Country ranking ==
For the 1999–2000 FIBA Korać Cup, the countries are allocated places according to their place on the FIBA country rankings, which takes into account their performance in European competitions from 1996–97 to 1998–99.

Country ranking for 1999–2000 FIBA Korać Cup

Rank	Country	Points	Teams
1	Italy	237.667	4
2	Greece	179.167	4
3	Spain	150.167	4
4	Turkey	70.500	4
5	France	68.833	4
6	Lithuania	55.556	4
7	Yugoslavia	54.500	4
8	Russia	35.695	4
9	Slovenia	30.622	4
10	Germany	27.833	4
11	Croatia	25.542	4
12	Israel	22.108	4
13	Poland	20.714	4
14	Belgium	13.817	4
15	Portugal	13.762	4
16	Ukraine	6.143	4
17	Austria	4.559	4
18	Hungary	4.429	4
19	Macedonia	4.375	4

Rank	Country	Points	Teams
20	Cyprus	3.528	4
21	Czech Republic	3.187	3
22	Bosnia and Herzegovina	3.008	3
23	Finland	2.917	3
24	Slovakia	2.583	3
25	Latvia	2.302	2
26	Bulgaria	1.917	2
27	Netherlands	1.722	2
28	Sweden	1.667	2
29	Estonia	0.667	1
30	Romania	0.611	1
31	Luxembourg	0.472	1
32	Switzerland	0.389	1
33	Georgia	0.333	1
34	England	0.278	1
35	Belarus	0.111	1
36	Albania	0.055	1
37	Denmark	0.000	1
38	Ireland	0.000	1

== Team allocation ==
The labels in the parentheses show how each team qualified for the place of its starting round:

- 1st, 2nd, 3rd, etc.: League position after Playoffs
- WC: Wild card

Regular season
(Italy) Aeroporti di Roma Virtus (6th)	(Spain) Jabones Pardo Fuenlabrada (7th)	(Lithuania) Neptunas (6th)	(Poland) Ericsson Bobry Bytom (3rd)
(Italy) Lineltex Imola (7th)	(Spain) Casademont Girona (8th)	(Lithuania) Sema Panevezys (7th)	(Poland) Pogon Ruda Ślaska (5th)
(Italy) Pepsi Basket Rimini (8th)	(Spain) Unicaja (9th)	(Federal Republic of Yugoslavia) ~~Beopetrol~~ (6th)	(Turkey) Galatasaray (6th)
(Italy) Bipop-Carire Reggiana (9th)	(France) Le Mans (6th)	(Federal Republic of Yugoslavia) ~~FMP Železnik~~ (7th)	(Turkey) Turk Telekom (7th)
(Greece) Aris (4th)	(France) Limoges CSP (7th)	(Federal Republic of Yugoslavia) ~~Spartak Subotica~~ (8th)	(Finland) Kouvot (1st)
(Greece) Maroussi (7th)	(France) SLUC Nancy (8th)	(Russia) Ural Great (4th)	(Sweden) Magic M7 (WC)
(Greece) Nikas Peristeri (8th)	(France) Olympique Antibes (9th)	(Russia) UNICS (5th)	
(Greece) Near East (9th)	(Lithuania) Šiauliai (4th)	(Russia) Lokomotiv Mineralnye Vody (9th)	
(Spain) Adecco Estudiantes (4th)	(Lithuania) Alita (5th)	(Poland) Anwil Wloclawek (2nd)	
Qualifying round
(Bosnia and Herzegovina) Sloboda Dita (2nd)	(Belgium) Telindus Union Mons-Hainaut (6th)	(Austria) UBM Arkadia Traiskirchen (6th)	(Bulgaria) Yambolgaz-92 (4th)
(Bosnia and Herzegovina) Brotnjo (3rd)	(Portugal) CAB Madeira (3rd)	(Austria) UBC Stahlbau Oberwart (5th)	(Netherlands) Den Helder (2nd)
(Bosnia and Herzegovina) Feal Široki (4th)	(Portugal) Seixal FC (5th)	(Finland) Piloset Turku (3rd)	(Netherlands) MPC-Donar Groningen (6th)
(Bosnia and Herzegovina) Posušje (5th)	(Portugal) Ovarense Aerosoles (9th)	(Finland) Äänekosken Huima (4th)	(Belarus) Grodno-93 (1st)
(Bosnia and Herzegovina) Borac Nektar (1st)	(Portugal) CA Queluz (13th)	(Finland) Namika Lahti (6th)	(Belarus) Gomel' Wildcats (4th)
(Slovenia) Loka Kava (6th)	(Cyprus) Apollon Limassol (3rd)	(Luxembourg) Etzella (1st)	(Poland) Azoty Unia Tarnów (7th)
(Slovenia) Slovan (7th)	(Cyprus) AEL Limassol (4th)	Racing Club Luxembourg	(Hungary) Atomerömü (4th)
(Slovenia) Zagorje (WC)	(Cyprus) Keravnos Keo (6th)	(Luxembourg) Sparta Bertrange	(North Macedonia) Nikol-Fert (4th)
(Slovenia) Rogla Atras (WC)	(Cyprus) Panathinaikos Limassol (7th)	(Switzerland) Fribourg Olympic (1st)	(Czech Republic) Sparta Praha (7th)
(Germany) Bayer 04 Leverkusen (4th)	(Croatia) Benston Zagreb (4th)	(Switzerland) Vacallo Win (2nd)	(Slovakia) AŠK Inter Slovnaft (2nd)
(Germany) Herzogtel Trier (5th)	(Croatia) Zrinjevac (6th)	(Switzerland) Lugano Snakes (4th)	(Romania) CSU Atlassib Sibiu (1st)
(Germany) Ratiopharm Ulm (7th)	(Croatia) Zagreb (8th)	(Turkey) Beşiktaş (8th)	(Georgia (country)) Azot Rustavi
(Germany) SG Braunschweig (11th)	(Israel) Maccabi Ramat-Gan (4th)	(Turkey) Pinar Karşiyaka (9th)	(England) London Leopards (WC)
(Belgium) Telindus Racing Antwerpen (2nd)	(Israel) Hapoel Galil Elyon (6th)	(Ukraine) CSKA Kyiv (1st)	(Iceland) IRB (WC)
(Belgium) Sunair Ostende (4th)	(Israel) Maccabi Haifa (7th)	(Ukraine) Kyiv (WC)	
(Belgium) Brother Gent (5th)	(Austria) Goldene Seiten Kapfenberg (2nd)	(Bulgaria) Levski Sofia (2nd)	

Notes

1. Note RS: Champions of the league of Republika Srpska.
2. Note SLO: Slovenian Basketball Federation decided that two teams from the Second Slovenian Basketball League replace KK ZM Maribor Lumar (rejected) and KK Postojna (hadn't applied for the competition).

== First Round ==
Team 1	Agg.	Team 2	1st leg	2nd leg
IRB (Iceland)	189–155	(England) London Leopards	111–75	78–80
Bayer 04 Leverkusen (Germany)	198–135	Racing Club Luxembourg	109–65	89–70
Äänekosken Huima (Finland)	184–173	(Germany) Ratiopharm Ulm	100–87	84–86
Piloset Turku (Finland)	177–166	(Poland) Azoty Unia Tarnów	92–86	85–80
Grodno-93 (Belarus)	147–144	(Finland) Namika Lahti	73–63	74–81
Gomel' Wildcats (Belarus)	137–188	(Ukraine) CSKA Kyiv	67–73	70–115
Azot Rustavi (Georgia (country))	146–190	(Ukraine) Kyiv	74–100	72–90
Rogla Atras (Slovenia)	122–157	(Slovakia) Inter Slovnaft	58–70	64–87
Atomerömü (Hungary)	150–156	(Slovenia) Slovan	85–86	65–70
Goldene Seiten Kapfenberg (Austria)	127–130	(Croatia) Zrinjevac	69–67	58–63
Sparta Praha (Czech Republic)	141–137	(Austria) Arkadia Traiskirchen	63–70	78–67
Stahlbau Oberwart (Austria)	115–127	(Belgium) Brother Gent	58–66	57–61
Etzella (Luxembourg)	112–204	(Belgium) Sunair Ostende	63–99	49–105
Sparta Bertrange (Luxembourg)	105–180	(Belgium) Telindus Racing Antwerpen	57–95	48–85
Queluz (Portugal)	139–164	(Belgium) Telindus Union Mons-Hainaut	79–89	60–75
Ovarense Aerosoles (Portugal)	156–129	(Germany) SG Braunschweig	94–55	62–74
Den Helder (Netherlands)	121–152	(Portugal) CAB Madeira	68–80	53–72
Vacallo Win (Switzerland)	164–134	(Netherlands) Donar	86–73	78–61
Lugano Snakes (Switzerland)	155–147	(Portugal) Seixal FC	83–71	72–76
Fribourg Olympic (Switzerland)	143–159	(Cyprus) Apollon Limassol	81–88	62–71
Panathinaikos Limassol (Cyprus)	140–160	(Germany) Herzogtel Trier	65–63	75–97
AEL Limassol (Cyprus)	137–205	(Israel) Maccabi Ramat-Gan	66–102	71–103
Keravnos Keo (Cyprus)	124–133	(Israel) Maccabi Haifa	67–67	57–66
Atlassib Sibiu (Romania)	114–181	(Israel) Hapoel Galil Elyon	61–74	53–107
Nikol-Fert (North Macedonia)	179–167	(Slovenia) Zagorje	82–87	97–80
Feal Široki (Bosnia and Herzegovina)	155–158	(Slovenia) Loka Kava	75–67	80–91
Brotnjo (Bosnia and Herzegovina)	134–133	(Croatia) Benston Zagreb	67–59	67–74
Sloboda Dita (Bosnia and Herzegovina)	113–124	(Croatia) Zagreb	54–60	59–64
Posušje (Bosnia and Herzegovina)	108–141	(Turkey) Beşiktaş	43–62	65–79
Yambolgaz-92 (Bulgaria)	121–135	(Turkey) Pinar Karşiyaka	62–54	59–81
Levski Sofia (Bulgaria)	153–143	(Bosnia and Herzegovina) Borac Nektar	72–57	81–86

== Second round ==
Key to colors
Top two places in each group advance to round of 32

=== Group A ===
	Team	Pld	W	L	PF	PA	Pts
1	(Spain) Casademont Girona	6	6	0	516	444	12
2	(Switzerland) Vacallo Win	6	4	2	456	444	10
3	(France) Olympique Antibes	6	2	4	423	447	8
4	(Belgium) Brother Gent	6	0	6	414	474	6

=== Group B ===
	Team	Pld	W	L	PF	PA	Pts
1	(Turkey) Galatasaray	6	6	0	501	403	12
2	(Italy) Lineltex Imola	6	4	2	466	424	10
3	(Croatia) Zrinjevac	6	2	4	432	451	8
4	(Slovenia) Loka Kava	6	0	6	342	463	6

=== Group C ===
	Team	Pld	W	L	PF	PA	Pts
1	(Israel) Maccabi Haifa	4	3	1	318	261	7
2	(Italy) Bipop-Carire Reggiana	4	2	2	297	300	6
3	(North Macedonia) Nikol-Fert	4	1	2	277	331	5
4	(Federal Republic of Yugoslavia) Beopetrol	0	0	0	–	-	0

=== Group D ===
	Team	Pld	W	L	PF	PA	Pts
1	(Spain) Unicaja	6	4	2	460	389	10
2	(Italy) Pepsi Rimini	6	4	2	439	430	10
3	(Belgium) Telindus Union Mons Hainaut	6	3	3	420	499	9
4	(Germany) Bayer 04 Leverkusen	6	1	5	436	437	7

=== Group E ===
	Team	Pld	W	L	PF	PA	Pts
1	(Italy) Aeroporti di Roma Virtus	6	6	0	451	381	12
2	(Israel) Hapoel Galil Elyon	6	4	2	455	445	10
3	(Turkey) Beşiktaş	6	2	4	397	410	8
4	(Slovakia) Inter Slovnaft	6	0	6	407	474	6

=== Group F ===
	Team	Pld	W	L	PF	PA	Pts
1	(Lithuania) Alita	6	4	2	496	485	10
2	(Russia) Lokomotiv Mineralnye Vody	6	4	2	489	483	10
3	(Finland) Piloset Turku	6	2	4	504	516	8
4	(Ukraine) Kyiv	6	2	4	528	533	8

=== Group G ===
	Team	Pld	W	L	PF	PA	Pts
1	(Israel) Maccabi Ramat Gan	6	5	1	493	433	11
2	(Greece) Maroussi	6	4	2	487	450	10
3	(Croatia) Zagreb	6	3	3	427	419	9
4	(Czech Republic) Sparta Praha	6	0	6	397	502	6

=== Group H ===
	Team	Pld	W	L	PF	PA	Pts
1	(Sweden) Magic M7	6	5	1	539	472	11
2	(Poland) Pogon Ruda Ślaska	6	5	1	489	451	11
3	(Lithuania) Neptunas	6	1	5	437	481	7
4	(Finland) Kouvot	6	1	5	427	488	7

=== Group I ===
	Team	Pld	W	L	PF	PA	Pts
1	(France) Limoges CSP	6	5	1	473	424	11
2	(Belgium) Telindus Racing Antwerpen	6	3	3	414	397	9
3	(Spain) Jabones Pardo Fuenlabrada	6	3	3	429	433	9
4	(Portugal) Ovarense Aerosoles	6	1	5	406	468	7

=== Group J ===
	Team	Pld	W	L	PF	PA	Pts
1	(Lithuania) Šiauliai	6	5	1	435	368	11
2	(Russia) UNICS	6	4	2	469	409	10
3	(Poland) Ericsson Bobry Bytom	6	2	4	419	436	8
4	(Belarus) Grodno-93	6	1	5	376	486	7

=== Group K ===
	Team	Pld	W	L	PF	PA	Pts
1	(France) SLUC Nancy	6	6	0	494	423	12
2	(Switzerland) Lugano Snakes	6	4	2	506	449	10
3	(Iceland) IRB	6	2	4	472	518	8
4	(Finland) Äänekosken Huima	6	0	6	440	522	6

=== Group L ===
	Team	Pld	W	L	PF	PA	Pts
1	(Poland) Anwil Wloclawek	6	4	2	488	427	10
2	(Ukraine) CSKA Kyiv	6	4	2	493	470	10
3	(Russia) Ural Great	6	4	2	481	437	10
4	(Lithuania) Sema Panevezys	6	0	6	356	484	6

=== Group M ===
	Team	Pld	W	L	PF	PA	Pts
1	(Turkey) Pinar Karşiyaka	4	3	1	302	291	7
2	(Greece) Near East	4	2	2	293	311	6
3	(Slovenia) Slovan	4	1	3	301	294	5
4	(Federal Republic of Yugoslavia) Spartak Subotica	0	0	0	–	-	0

=== Group N ===
	Team	Pld	W	L	PF	PA	Pts
1	(Greece) Nikas Peristeri	6	4	2	481	411	10
2	(Turkey) Turk Telekom	6	4	2	477	451	10
3	(Bosnia and Herzegovina) Brotnjo	6	4	2	526	545	10
4	(Germany) Herzogtel Trier	6	0	6	501	578	6

=== Group O ===
	Team	Pld	W	L	PF	PA	Pts
1	(Greece) Aris	4	3	1	331	305	7
2	(Cyprus) Apollon Limassol	4	2	2	313	357	6
3	(Bulgaria) Levski Sofia	4	1	3	343	325	5
4	(Federal Republic of Yugoslavia) FMP Železnik	0	0	0	–	-	0

=== Group P ===
	Team	Pld	W	L	PF	PA	Pts
1	(Spain) Adecco Estudiantes	6	5	1	543	485	11
2	(Belgium) Sunair Oostende	6	3	3	442	468	9
3	(Portugal) CAB Madeira	6	2	4	470	497	8
4	(France) Le Mans	6	2	4	472	477	8

Notes

1. Note YUG: KK Beopetrol, KK Spartak Subotica and KK FMP Železnik withdrew from the competition because FIBA did not approve Yugoslavian courts for playing domestic games (after NATO air strikes on Yugoslavia) and Yugoslavian teams refused to play their home games abroad.

== Playoffs ==
=== Bracket ===
Third round
(Italy) Lineltex Imola	72	78	150
(Spain) Casademont Girona	83	85	168
(Italy) Pepsi Rimini	81	58	139
(Israel) Maccabi Haifa	61	66	127
(Russia) Lokomotiv Mineralnye Vody	72	59	131
(Italy) Aeroporti di Roma Virtus	69	86	155
(Poland) Pogoń Ruda Śląska	100	70	170
(Israel) Maccabi Ramat Gan	68	91	159
(Russia) UNICS	64	69	133
(France) Limoges CSP	86	93	179
(Ukraine) CSKA Kyiv	74	73	147
(France) Nancy	73	68	141
(Turkey) Türk Telekom	78	65	143
(Turkey) Pinar Karşıyaka	72	66	138
(Belgium) Sunair Oostende	75	71	146
(Greece) Aris	65	87	152
(Switzerland) Vacallo Win	58	66	124
(Turkey) Galatasaray	69	82	151
(Italy) Bipop Carire Reggiana	67	55	122
(Spain) Unicaja	74	61	135
(Israel) Hapoel Galil Elyon	88	65	153
(Lithuania) Alita	61	81	142
(Greece) Maroussi	89	75	164
(Sweden) Magic M7	74	81	155
(Belgium) Telindus Racing Antwerpen	69	71	140
(Lithuania) Šiauliai	66	69	135
(Switzerland) Lugano	60	67	127
(Poland) Anwil Włocławek	71	72	143
(Greece) Near East	73	63	136
(Greece) Nikas Peristeri	80	66	146
(Cyprus) Apollon Limassol	56	79	135
(Spain) Adecco Estudiantes	91	114	205

Top 16
(Spain) Casademont Girona	67	79	146
(Italy) Pepsi Rimini	65	72	137
(Italy) Aeroporti di Roma Virtus	66	77	143
(Poland) Pogoń Ruda Śląska	64	75	139
(France) Limoges CSP	86	100	186
(Ukraine) CSKA Kyiv	73	71	144
(Turkey) Türk Telekom	82	73	155
(Greece) Aris	59	62	121
(Turkey) Galatasaray	67	68	135
(Spain) Unicaja	64	86	150
(Israel) Hapoel Galil Elyon	80	54	134
(Greece) Maroussi	77	70	147
(Belgium) Telindus Racing Antwerpen	71	56	127
(Poland) Anwil Włocławek	65	75	140
(Greece) Nikas Peristeri	75	71	146
(Spain) Adecco Estudiantes	85	79	164

Quarterfinals
(Spain) Casademont Girona	61	78	139
(Italy) Aeroporti di Roma Virtus	67	66	133
(France) Limoges CSP	71	67	138
(Turkey) Türk Telekom	57	75	132
(Spain) Unicaja	77	63	140
(Greece) Maroussi	58	60	118
(Poland) Anwil Włocławek	74	55	129
(Spain) Adecco Estudiantes	69	84	153

Semifinals
(Spain) Casademont Girona	77	57	134
(France) Limoges CSP	77	69	146
(Spain) Unicaja	85	47	132
(Spain) Adecco Estudiantes	72	53	125

Finals
(France) Limoges CSP	80	51	131
(Spain) Unicaja	58	60	118

=== Third round ===
Team 1	Agg.	Team 2	1st leg	2nd leg
Vacallo Win (Switzerland)	124–151	(Turkey) Galatasaray	58–69	66–82
Lineltex Imola (Italy)	150–168	(Spain) Casademont Girona	72–83	78–85
Bipop Carire Reggiana (Italy)	122–135	(Spain) Unicaja	67–74	55–61
Pepsi Rimini (Italy)	139–127	(Israel) Maccabi Haifa	81–61	58–66
Hapoel Galil Elyon (Israel)	153–142	(Lithuania) Alita	88–61	65–81
Lokomotiv Mineralnye Vody (Russia)	131–155	(Italy) Aeroporti di Roma Virtus	72–69	59–86
Maroussi (Greece)	164–155	(Sweden) Magic M7	89–74	75–81
Pogoń Ruda Śląska (Poland)	170–159	(Israel) Maccabi Ramat Gan	100–68	70–91
Telindus Racing Antwerpen (Belgium)	140–135	(Lithuania) Šiauliai	69–66	71–69
UNICS (Russia)	133–179	(France) Limoges CSP	64–86	69–93
Lugano (Switzerland)	127–143	(Poland) Anwil Włocławek	60–71	67–72
CSKA Kyiv (Ukraine)	147–141	(France) Nancy	74–73	73–68
Near East (Greece)	136–146	(Greece) Nikas Peristeri	73–80	63–66
Türk Telekom (Turkey)	143–138	(Turkey) Pinar Karşıyaka	78–72	65–66
Apollon Limassol (Cyprus)	135–205	(Spain) Adecco Estudiantes	56–91	79–114
Sunair Oostende (Belgium)	146–152	(Greece) Aris	75–65	71–87

=== Top 16 ===
Team 1	Agg.	Team 2	1st leg	2nd leg
Galatasaray (Turkey)	135–150	(Spain) Unicaja	67–64	68–86
Casademont Girona (Spain)	146–137	(Italy) Pepsi Rimini	67–65	79–72
Hapoel Galil Elyon (Israel)	134–147	(Greece) Maroussi	80–77	54–70
Aeroporti di Roma Virtus (Italy)	143–139	(Poland) Pogoń Ruda Śląska	66–64	77–75
Telindus Racing Antwerpen (Belgium)	127–140	(Poland) Anwil Włocławek	71–65	56–75
Limoges CSP (France)	186–144	(Ukraine) CSKA Kyiv	86–73	100–71
Nikas Peristeri (Greece)	146–164	(Spain) Adecco Estudiantes	75–85	71–79
Türk Telekom (Turkey)	155–121	(Greece) Aris	82–59	73–62

=== Quarter finals ===
Team 1	Agg.	Team 2	1st leg	2nd leg
Unicaja (Spain)	140–118	(Greece) Maroussi	77–58	63–60
Casademont Girona (Spain)	139–133	(Italy) Aeroporti di Roma Virtus	61–67	78–66
Anwil Włocławek (Poland)	129–153	(Spain) Adecco Estudiantes	74–69	55–84
Limoges CSP (France)	138–132	(Turkey) Türk Telekom	71–57	67–75

=== Semi finals ===
Team 1	Agg.	Team 2	1st leg	2nd leg
Unicaja (Spain)	132–125	(Spain) Adecco Estudiantes	85–72	47–53
Casademont Girona (Spain)	134–146	(France) Limoges CSP	77–77	57–69

=== Finals ===
Team 1	Agg.	Team 2	1st leg	2nd leg
Limoges CSP (France)	131–118	(Spain) Unicaja	80–58	51–60

== Rosters ==
(France) Limoges : Stephane Dumas, Marcus Brown, Yann Bonato (C), Harper Williams, Frederic Weis; David Frigout, Bruno Hamm, Jean-Philippe Méthélie, Thierry Rupert, Stjepan Stazic. Coach: Duško Ivanović
(Spain) Unicaja Málaga: Jean-Marc Jaumin, Veljko Mrsic, Daniel Romero, Bryan Sallier, Juan Antonio Orenga (C); Giancarlo Marcaccini, Jean-Jacques Conceição, Xavier Fernandez, Jesus Lazaro, Richard Petruska. Coach: Bozidar Maljkovic

1999–00 FIBA Korać Cup Champions

Limoges CSP
3rd title

== See also ==
- 1999-00 FIBA Euroleague
- 1999-00 FIBA Saporta Cup
