= 1997–98 FIBA Korać Cup =

- League: FIBA Korać Cup
- Sport: Basketball

Finals
- Champions: (Italy) Mash Jeans Verona
- Runners-up: (Federal Republic of Yugoslavia) Crvena zvezda

FIBA Korać Cup seasons
- ← 1996–97 1998–99 →

The 1997–98 FIBA Korać Cup was the 27th edition of the third tier European basketball tournament FIBA Korać cup and had 84 participants (42 teams played from the first round and another 42 teams from the second round). Mash Jeans Verona won the tournament.

== Team allocation ==
=== Country ranking ===
For the 1997–1998 FIBA Korać Cup, the countries are allocated places according to their place on the FIBA country rankings, which takes into account their performance in European competitions from 1994–95 to 1996–97.

Country ranking for 1996–1997 FIBA Korać Cup

Rank	Country	Points	Teams	Notes
1	Spain	279.667	4	
2	Greece	275.000	4	
3	Italy	190.833	4	
4	France	117.500	4	
5	Turkey	96.667	4	
6	Russia	70.542	4	
7	Germany	55.389	4	
8	Croatia	50.833	4	
9	Israel	43.048	4	
10	Slovenia	38.833	4	
11	Yugoslavia	25.000	4	
12	Portugal	23.071	4	
13	Belgium	22.500	4	
14	Poland	21.206	4	
15	Lithuania	19.416	4	
16	Ukraine	15.762	4	
17	Hungary	9.667	4	
18	Czech Republic	7.139	4	
19	Slovakia	6.555	4	

Rank	Country	Points	Teams	Notes
20	Macedonia	6.111	4	
21	Austria	5.445	3	
22	Sweden	5.333	3	
23	Cyprus	4.333	3	
24	England	4.167	3	
25	Latvia	3.722	2	
26	Switzerland	3.083	2	
27	Bulgaria	2.694	2	
28	Romania	2.389	2	
29	Finland	1.861	1	
30	Bosnia and Herzegovina	1.778	1	
31	Estonia	1.500	1	
32	Netherlands	1.500	1	
33	Georgia	1.500	1	
34	Luxembourg	1.444	1	
35	Albania	1.361	1	
36	Denmark	0.167	1	
37	Moldova	0.111	1	
38	Belarus	0.056	1	
39	Iceland	0.056	1	
40	Ireland	0.000	1	
41	Wales	0.000	1	

=== Teams ===
The labels in the parentheses show how each team qualified for the place of its starting round:

- 1st, 2nd, 3rd, etc.: League position after Regular Season or Playoffs
- WC: Wild card

Regular season
(Spain) Tau Cerámica (5th)	(France) Cholet (6th)	(Russia) Shakhtyor Irkutsk (5th)	(Lithuania) Šiauliai (4th)
(Spain) Leon Caja España (6th)	(France) Montpellier Paillade (7th)	(Russia) Spartak Moscow (8th)	(Lithuania) Statyba-Lietuvos rytas (10th)
(Spain) Unicaja (7th)	(France) SLUC Nancy (8th)	(Russia) Lokomotiv Kazan (WC)	(Ukraine) Dendi Basket (3rd)
(Spain) TDK Manresa (8th)	(France) JDA Dijon (9th)	(Poland) Komfort Stargard Szczecinski (2nd)	(Ukraine) CSKA Kyiv (5th)
(Greece) Peristeri 3Bit (4th)	(Turkey) Kombassan Konya (6th)	(Poland) Stal Bobrek Bytom (4th)	(Federal Republic of Yugoslavia) Buducnost (4th)
(Greece) Aris Moda Bagno (6th)	(Turkey) Tuborg Pilsner (7th)	(Poland) WTK Nobiles Włocławek (5th)	(Portugal) Ovarense Aerosoles (8th)
(Greece) Sporting (8th)	(Turkey) Darüșșafaka (8th)	(Israel) Hapoel Galil Elyon (5th)	(Cyprus) AEL Limassol
(Greece) Papagou Katselis (9th)	(Turkey) Galatasaray (9th)	(Israel) Maccabi Rishon LeZion (6th)	
(Italy) Mash Jeans Verona (4th)	(Germany) Telekom Baskets Bonn (2nd)	(Israel) Bnei Herzliya (7th)	
(Italy) Calze Pompea Roma (6th)	(Germany) UniVersa Bamberg (4th)	(Slovenia) ZM Maribor Ovni (6th)	
(Italy) Varese Roosters (7th)	(Germany) TVG Trier (6th)	(Slovenia) Helios Domžale (5th)	
(Italy) Fontanafredda Siena (9th)	(Germany) Tally Oberelchingen (7th)	(Croatia) Zadar (4th)	
Qualifying round
(North Macedonia) Žito Veles (2nd)	(Federal Republic of Yugoslavia) Vojvodina (5th)	(Finland) Lahti Logistics (7th)	(Sweden) Astra Södertälje (5th)
(North Macedonia) Orka Sport (CF)	(Federal Republic of Yugoslavia) Spartak Subotica (6th)	(Finland) Saab UU (8th)	(Cyprus) Panathinaikos Limassol
(North Macedonia) Strumica Tabak (6th)	(Federal Republic of Yugoslavia) Crvena Zvezda (12th)	(Bosnia and Herzegovina) Brotnjo (1st)	(Latvia) Ventspils (4th)
(North Macedonia) Nemetali Strumica (7th)	(Portugal) Aveiro Basket	(Bosnia and Herzegovina) Češko (7th)	(Switzerland) Fribourg Olympic (1st)
(Austria) UBC Stahlbau Oberwart (2nd)	(Portugal) Benfica	(Netherlands) Ricoh Astronauts (2nd)	(Estonia) Estonian Fairs (1st)
(Austria) Montan Kapfenberg (3rd)	(Portugal) CA Queluz	(Netherlands) Hans Verkerk Den Helder (5th)	(Georgia (country)) Azot Rustavi
(Austria) UKJ Möllersdorf Traiskirchen (4th)	(Belgium) Belgacom Union Mons (3rd)	(Luxembourg) Résidense (1st)	
(Austria) UBC Mattersburg 49ers (5th)	(Belgium) Echo Houthalen (5th)	(Luxembourg) Sparta Bertrange (2nd)	
(Bulgaria) Slavia Sofia (1st)	(Hungary) Albacomp Fehérvár (3rd)	(Croatia) Benston Zagreb (5th)	
(Bulgaria) Cherno More (3rd)	(Hungary) Falco Szombathely (5th)	(Poland) MKS Polonia Przemysl (7th)	
(Bulgaria) Kompakt (4th)	(Romania) Dinamo București (1st)	(Ukraine) Mykolaiv (6th)	
(Bulgaria) Ficosota Shumen (5th)	(Romania) Erbaşu-Steaua București (2nd)	(Czech Republic) Sparta Praha (9th)	

Notes

1. Note YUG: KK Vojvodina participated instead of BFC Beočin because of merging those two clubs after the 1996–97 season.
2. KK Crvena zvezda
3. Mornar Bar
4. Note BIH: After the war in Bosnia, basketball league in BIH was divided in three parts by ethnicity. HKK Brotnjo participated as a champion of the league of Herzeg-Bosnia

== Qualifying round ==
Team 1	Agg.	Team 2	1st leg	2nd leg
Residense (Luxembourg)	157–182	(Portugal) Aveiro	79–81	78–101
Steaua București (Romania)	135–141	(North Macedonia) Strumica Tabak	63–53	72–88
Mykolaiv (Ukraine)	127–133	(Bulgaria) Slavia Sofia	66–67	61–66
Saab UU (Finland)	159–166	(Sweden) Astra Södertälje	80–83	79–83
Montan Kapfenberg (Austria)	143–134	(Hungary) Albacomp Fehérvár	65–74	78–60
Crvena zvezda (Federal Republic of Yugoslavia)	179–131	(Cyprus) Panathinaikos Limassol	90–54	89–77
Češko (Bosnia and Herzegovina)	136–145	(Romania) Dinamo București	72–68	64–77
Benfica (Portugal)	144–130	(Switzerland) Fribourg Olympic	66–67	78–63
Hans Verkerk (Netherlands)	147–111	(Luxembourg) Sparta Bertrange	93–64	54–47
Sparta Praha (Czech Republic)	138–127	(Poland) Polonia Przemyśl	63–60	75–67
Echo Houthalen (Belgium)	167–166	(Austria) Möllersdorf Traiskirchen	88–74	79–92
Ficosota Shumen (Bulgaria)	180–191	(North Macedonia) Orka	85–85	95–106
Žito (North Macedonia)	155–151	(Bulgaria) Kompakt	84–70	71–81
Mattersburg 49ers (Austria)	125–150	(Croatia) Benston Zagreb	75–83	50–67
Ricoh Astronauts (Netherlands)	128–160	(Belgium) Belgacom Union Mons	57–81	71–79
Lahti Logistics (Finland)	153–163	(Latvia) Ventspils	80–89	73–74
Brotnjo (Bosnia and Herzegovina)	0–40	(Hungary) Falco Szombathely	0–20	0–20
Queluz (Portugal)	132–134	(Austria) Stahlbau Oberwart	67–66	65–68
Azot Rustavi (Georgia (country))	148–165	(Estonia) Estonian Fairs	81–75	67–90
Nemetali Strumica (North Macedonia)	119–204	(Federal Republic of Yugoslavia) Vojvodina	66–108	53–96
Cherno More (Bulgaria)	186–168	(Federal Republic of Yugoslavia) Spartak Subotica	97–70	89–98

== Regular season ==
Key to colors
Top two places in each group advance to round of 32

=== Group A ===
	Team	Pld	W	L	PF	PA	PD	Pts
1.	(Spain) Leon Caja España	6	6	0	549	465	+84	12
2.	(Italy) Fontanafredda Siena	6	4	2	498	477	+21	10
3.	(Portugal) Aveiro	6	1	5	469	521	−52	7
4.	(Germany) Tally Oberelchingen	6	1	5	453	506	−53	7

=== Group B ===
	Team	Pld	W	L	PF	PA	PD	Pts
1.	(Federal Republic of Yugoslavia) Crvena zvezda	6	5	1	513	431	+72	11
2.	(Greece) Peristeri 3Bit	6	4	2	472	419	+53	10
3.	(Israel) Bnei Herzliya	6	2	4	446	471	−25	8
4.	(Austria) Montan Kapfenberg	6	1	5	430	540	−76	7

=== Group C ===
	Team	Pld	W	L	PF	PA	PD	Pts
1.	(Lithuania) Statyba-Lietuvos rytas	6	4	2	516	466	+50	10
2.	(Poland) Komfort Stargard Szczecinski	6	3	3	446	433	+13	9
3.	(Russia) Lokomotiv Kazan	6	3	3	447	474	−27	9
4.	(Sweden) Astra Södertälje	6	2	4	500	536	−36	8

=== Group D ===
	Team	Pld	W	L	PF	PA	PD	Pts
1.	(Turkey) Darüșșafaka	6	5	1	476	399	+77	11
2.	(Federal Republic of Yugoslavia) Budućnost	6	5	1	506	434	+72	11
3.	(Bulgaria) Slavia Sofia	6	1	5	490	530	−40	7
4.	(North Macedonia) Strumica Tabak	6	1	5	446	555	−109	7

=== Group E ===
	Team	Pld	W	L	PF	PA	PD	Pts
1.	(Israel) Hapoel Galil Elyon	6	5	1	471	441	+30	11
2.	(Greece) Papagou Katselis	6	3	3	424	392	+32	9
3.	(Romania) Dinamo București	6	3	3	450	461	−11	9
4.	(Cyprus) AEL Limassol	6	1	5	469	520	−51	7

=== Group F ===
	Team	Pld	W	L	PF	PA	PD	Pts
1.	(Germany) UniVersa Bamberg	6	6	0	515	439	+76	12
2.	(France) Montpellier Paillade	6	4	2	462	440	+22	10
3.	(Portugal) Benfica	6	2	4	479	465	+14	8
4.	(Netherlands) Hans Verkerk Den Helder	6	0	6	350	462	−112	6

=== Group G ===
	Team	Pld	W	L	PF	PA	PD	Pts
1.	(Italy) Mash Jeans Verona	6	4	2	495	457	+38	10
2.	(Turkey) Kombassan Konya	6	4	2	430	402	+28	10
3.	(North Macedonia) Orka	6	3	3	446	488	−42	9
4.	(Croatia) Zadar	6	1	5	408	432	−24	7

=== Group H ===
	Team	Pld	W	L	PF	PA	PD	Pts
1.	(France) SLUC Nancy	6	5	1	517	425	+92	11
2.	(Spain) Tau Cerámica	6	4	2	491	389	+102	10
3.	(Belgium) Echo Houthalen	6	2	4	435	489	−54	8
4.	(Czech Republic) Sparta Praha	6	1	5	374	514	−140	6

=== Group I ===
	Team	Pld	W	L	PF	PA	PD	Pts
1.	(Greece) Aris Moda Bagno	6	5	1	528	391	+137	11
2.	(Germany) TVG Trier	6	4	2	508	478	+30	10
3.	(Hungary) Falco Szombathely	6	3	3	491	535	−43	9
4.	(Slovenia) Maribor Ovni	6	0	6	376	499	−123	6

=== Group J ===
	Team	Pld	W	L	PF	PA	PD	Pts
1.	(France) Cholet	6	6	0	454	383	+71	12
2.	(Spain) TDK Manresa	6	4	2	479	456	+23	10
3.	(Portugal) Ovarense Aerosoles	6	1	5	428	467	−39	7
4.	(Belgium) Belgacom Union Mons	6	1	5	433	488	−55	7

=== Group K ===
	Team	Pld	W	L	PF	PA	PD	Pts
1.	(Latvia) Ventspils	6	4	2	514	423	+91	10
2.	(Russia) Spartak Moscow	6	4	2	492	426	+66	10
3.	(Ukraine) CSKA Kyiv	6	4	2	428	443	−15	10
4.	(Poland) Nobiles Włocławek	6	0	6	384	526	−142	6

=== Group L ===
	Team	Pld	W	L	PF	PA	PD	Pts
1.	(Italy) Varese Roosters	6	5	1	505	424	+81	11
2.	(Turkey) Galatasaray	6	4	2	506	428	+78	10
3.	(Croatia) Benston Zagreb	6	3	3	482	476	+6	9
4.	(North Macedonia) Žito	6	0	6	411	576	−165	6

=== Group M ===
	Team	Pld	W	L	PF	PA	PD	Pts
1.	(Italy) Calze Pompea Roma	6	6	0	434	343	+91	12
2.	(Israel) Maccabi Rishon LeZion	6	3	3	431	417	+14	9
3.	(Federal Republic of Yugoslavia) Vojvodina	6	3	3	378	410	−32	9
4.	(Slovenia) Helios Domžale	6	0	6	389	462	−73	6

=== Group N ===
	Team	Pld	W	L	PF	PA	PD	Pts
1.	(Poland) Stal Bobrek Bytom	6	4	2	487	476	+11	10
2.	(Bulgaria) Cherno More	6	3	3	471	464	+7	10
3.	(Turkey) Tuborg Pilsner	6	3	3	514	479	+35	9
4.	(Greece) Sporting	6	2	4	425	478	−53	8

=== Group O ===
	Team	Pld	W	L	PF	PA	PD	Pts
1.	(Spain) Unicaja	6	5	1	486	411	+75	11
2.	(France) JDA Dijon	6	4	2	454	435	+19	10
3.	(Germany) Telekom Baskets Bonn	6	2	4	475	478	−3	8
4.	(Austria) Stahlbau Oberwart	6	1	5	453	544	−91	7

=== Group P ===
	Team	Pld	W	L	PF	PA	PD	Pts
1.	(Ukraine) Dendi-Basket	6	5	1	494	444	+50	11
2.	(Lithuania) Šiauliai	6	4	2	509	446	+63	10
3.	(Russia) Shakhtyor Irkutsk	6	2	4	431	459	−28	9
4.	(Estonia) Estonian Fairs	6	1	5	419	504	−85	7

== Round of 32 ==
Team 1	Agg.	Team 2	1st leg	2nd leg
Fontanafredda Siena (Italy)	154–163	(Federal Republic of Yugoslavia) Crvena zvezda	81–72	73–91
Peristeri 3Bit (Greece)	145–137	(Spain) León Caja España	78–69	67–68
Komfort Stargard Szczeciński (Poland)	133–137	(Turkey) Darüşşafaka	78–69	55–68
Budućnost (Federal Republic of Yugoslavia)	144–138	(Lithuania) Statyba-Lietuvos rytas	83–69	61–69
Papagou Katselis (Greece)	129–117	(Germany) UniVersa Bamberg	60–71	69–46
Montpellier Paillade (France)	118–136	(Israel) Hapoel Galil Elyon	61–56	57–80
Kombassan Konya (Turkey)	140–137	(France) SLUC Nancy	74–68	66–69
Tau Cerámica (Spain)	155–169	(Italy) Mash Jeans Verona	70–90	85–79
TVG Trier (Germany)	145–170	(France) Cholet	75–85	70–85
TDK Manresa (Spain)	158–163	(Greece) Aris Moda Bagno	84–67	74–96
Spartak Moscow (Russia)	173–198	(Italy) Varese Roosters	79–104	94–94
Galatasaray (Turkey)	141–146	(Latvia) Ventspils	77–76	64–70
Maccabi Rishon LeZion (Israel)	149–163	(Poland) Stal Bobrek Bytom	63–81	86–82
Cherno More (Bulgaria)	134–163	(Italy) Calze Pompea Roma	79–78	55–85
JDA Dijon (France)	171–152	(Ukraine) Dendi	85–79	86–73
Šiauliai (Lithuania)	133–142	(Spain) Unicaja	74–73	59–69

== Round of 16 ==
Team 1	Agg.	Team 2	1st leg	2nd leg
Crvena zvezda (Federal Republic of Yugoslavia)	148–139	(Turkey) Darüşşafaka	67–62	81–77
Peristeri 3Bit (Greece)	136–135	(Federal Republic of Yugoslavia) Budućnost	76–57	60–78
Papagou Katselis (Greece)	134–142	(Turkey) Kombassan Konya	79–76	55–66
Hapoel Galil Elyon (Israel)	146–154	(Italy) Mash Jeans Verona	86–83	60–71
Cholet (France)	177–159	(Italy) Varese Roosters	95–70	82–89
Aris Moda Bagno (Greece)	175–133	(Latvia) Ventspils	102–66	73–67
Stal Bobrek Bytom (Poland)	133–138	(France) JDA Dijon	77–63	56–75
Calze Pompea Roma (Italy)	139–129	(Spain) Unicaja	74–55	65–74

== Quarterfinals ==
Team 1	Agg.	Team 2	1st leg	2nd leg
Crvena zvezda (Federal Republic of Yugoslavia)	144–133	(Turkey) Kombassan Konya	81–66	63–67
Peristeri 3Bit (Greece)	151–158	(Italy) Mash Jeans Verona	72–68	79–90
Cholet (France)	139–124	(France) JDA Dijon	82–62	57–62
Aris Moda Bagno (Greece)	158–166	(Italy) Calze Pompea Roma	79–80	79–86

== Semifinals ==
Team 1	Agg.	Team 2	1st leg	2nd leg
Crvena zvezda (Federal Republic of Yugoslavia)	155–145	(France) Cholet	81–49	74–96
Mash Jeans Verona (Italy)	166–154	(Italy) Calze Pompea Roma	96–82	70–72

== Finals ==
Team 1	Agg.	Team 2	1st leg	2nd leg
Mash Jeans Verona (Italy)	141–138	(Federal Republic of Yugoslavia) Crvena zvezda	68–74	73–64

== Rosters ==
(Italy) Scaligera Verona: Mike Iuzzolino, Myron Brown, Randolph Keys, Roberto Dalla Vecchia (C), Alessandro Boni; Roberto Bullara, Hansi Gnad, Joachim Jerichow. Coach: Andrea Mazzon
(Socialist Federal Republic of Yugoslavia) Crvena zvezda: Igor Rakocevic, Zlatko Bolic, Oliver Popovic, Milenko Topic, Jovo Stanojevic; Vojkan Bencic, Vladimir Kuzmanovic, Dejan Miskovic, Zeljko Topalovic, Igor Perović. Coach: Vladislav Lucic

1997–98 FIBA Korać Cup Champions

Mash Jeans Verona
1st title

== See also ==
- 1997–98 FIBA EuroLeague
- 1997–98 FIBA EuroCup
