= Pallacanestro Virtus Roma in international competitions =

Pallacanestro Virtus Roma history and statistics in FIBA Europe and Euroleague Basketball (company) competitions.

== 1980s ==
=== 1982–83 FIBA Korać Cup, 3rd–tier ===
The 1982–83 FIBA Korać Cup was the 12th installment of the European 3rd-tier level professional basketball club competition FIBA Korać Cup, running from October 6, 1982 to March 8, 1983. The trophy was won by the title holder Limoges CSP, who defeated -for second consecutive time- Šibenka by a result of 94–86 at Deutschlandhalle in West Berlin, West Germany. Overall, Banco di Roma achieved in present competition a record of 8 wins against 2 defeat, in three successive rounds. More detailed:

==== First round ====
- Tie played on October 6, 1982 and on October 13, 1982.

Team 1	Agg.	Team 2	1st leg	2nd leg
CEPF (Belgium)	142–178	(Italy) Banco di Roma	66–101	76–77

==== Second round ====
- Tie played on November 3, 1982 and on November 10, 1982.

Team 1	Agg.	Team 2	1st leg	2nd leg
Aris (Greece)	146–175	(Italy) Banco di Roma	86–89	60–86

==== Top 16 ====
- Day 1 (December 8, 1982)

Team 1	Score	Team 2
Nová huť Ostrava (Czechoslovakia)	70–73	(Italy) Banco di Roma

- Day 2 (December 15, 1982)

Team 1	Score	Team 2
Banco di Roma (Italy)	89–77	(Socialist Federal Republic of Yugoslavia) Crvena zvezda

- Day 3 (January 12, 1983)

Team 1	Score	Team 2
Limoges CSP (France)	87–80	(Italy) Banco di Roma

- Day 4 (January 19, 1983)

Team 1	Score	Team 2
Banco di Roma (Italy)	97–67	(Czechoslovakia) Nová huť Ostrava

- Day 5 (January 25, 1983)

Team 1	Score	Team 2
Crvena zvezda (Socialist Federal Republic of Yugoslavia)	97–107	(Italy) Banco di Roma

- Day 6 (February 2, 1983)

Team 1	Score	Team 2
Banco di Roma (Italy)	73–74	(France) Limoges CSP

- Group A standings:

Pos.	Team	Pld.	Pts.	W	L	PF	PA	PD
1.	(France) Limoges CSP	6	11	5	1	503	482	+21
2.	(Italy) Banco di Roma	6	10	4	2	519	472	+47
3.	(Socialist Federal Republic of Yugoslavia) Crvena zvezda	6	9	3	3	528	509	+19
4.	(Czechoslovakia) Nová huť Ostrava	6	6	0	6	445	532	-87

=== 1983–84 FIBA European Champions Cup, 1st–tier ===
The 1983–84 FIBA European Champions Cup was the 27th installment of the European top-tier level professional basketball club competition FIBA European Champions Cup (now called EuroLeague), running from September 15, 1983 to March 29, 1984. The trophy was won by Banco di Roma, who defeated FC Barcelona by a result of 79–73 at Patinoire des Vernets in Geneva, Switzerland. Overall, Banco di Roma achieved in the present competition a record of 12 wins against 3 defeats, in five successive rounds. More detailed:

==== First round ====
- Bye

==== Second round ====
- Tie played on September 29, 1983 and on October 6, 1983.

Team 1	Agg.	Team 2	1st leg	2nd leg
T71 Dudelange (Luxembourg)	84–157	(Italy) Banco di Roma	40–72	44–85

==== Top 12 ====
- Tie played on October 27, 1983 and on November 3, 1983.

Team 1	Agg.	Team 2	1st leg	2nd leg
Partizani Tirana (Albania)	124–171	(Italy) Banco di Roma	69–78	55–93

==== Semifinals ====
- Day 1 (December 8, 1983)

Team 1	Score	Team 2
Limoges CSP (France)	74–76	(Italy) Banco di Roma

- Day 2 (December 15, 1983)

Team 1	Score	Team 2
FC Barcelona (Spain)	81–74	(Italy) Banco di Roma

- Day 3 (January 12, 1984)

Team 1	Score	Team 2
Banco di Roma (Italy)	85–86	(Italy) Jollycolombani Cantù

- Day 4 (January 19, 1984)

Team 1	Score	Team 2
Banco di Roma (Italy)	82–67	(Israel) Maccabi Elite Tel Aviv

- Day 5 (January 26, 1984)

Team 1	Score	Team 2
Bosna (Socialist Federal Republic of Yugoslavia)	86–77	(Italy) Banco di Roma

- Day 6 (February 2, 1984)

Team 1	Score	Team 2
Banco di Roma (Italy)	81–76	(France) Limoges CSP

- Day 7 (February 16, 1984)

Team 1	Score	Team 2
Banco di Roma (Italy)	74–71	(Spain) FC Barcelona

- Day 8 (February 23, 1984)

Team 1	Score	Team 2
Jollycolombani Cantù (Italy)	71–79	(Italy) Banco di Roma

- Day 9 (March 1, 1984)

Team 1	Score	Team 2
Maccabi Elite Tel Aviv (Israel)	85–91	(Italy) Banco di Roma

- Day 10 (March 8, 1984)

Team 1	Score	Team 2
Banco di Roma (Italy)	66–55	(Socialist Federal Republic of Yugoslavia) Bosna

- Semifinals group stage standings:

Pos.	Team	Pld.	Pts.	W	L	PF	PA	PD	Tie-break
1.	(Spain) FC Barcelona	10	17	7	3	910	825	+85	1–1 (+4)
2.	(Italy) Banco di Roma	10	17	7	3	785	+752	+33	1–1 (-4)
3.	(Italy) Jollycolombani Cantù	10	16	6	4	865	826	+39	
4.	(Socialist Federal Republic of Yugoslavia) Bosna	10	15	5	5	843	928	-85	
5.	(Israel) Maccabi Elite Tel Aviv	10	13	3	7	872	902	-30	
6.	(France) Limoges CSP	10	12	2	8	937	979	-42	

==== Final ====
- March 29, 1984 at Patinoire des Vernets in Geneva, Switzerland.

Team 1	Score	Team 2
FC Barcelona (Spain)	73–79	(Italy) Banco di Roma

=== 1984–85 FIBA European Champions Cup, 1st–tier ===
The 1984–85 FIBA European Champions Cup was the 28th installment of the European top-tier level professional basketball club competition FIBA European Champions Cup (now called EuroLeague), running from September 21, 1984 to April 3, 1985. The trophy was won by Cibona, who defeated Real Madrid by a result of 87–78 at Peace and Friendship Stadium in Piraeus, Greece. Overall, Banco di Roma achieved in the present competition a record of 7 wins against 7 defeats, in four successive rounds. More detailed:

==== First round ====
- Bye

==== Second round ====
- Tie played on October 4, 1984 and on October 11, 1984.

Team 1	Agg.	Team 2	1st leg	2nd leg
SISU (Denmark)	147–287	(Italy) Banco di Roma	87–146	60–141

==== Top 12 ====
- Tie played on November 1, 1984 and on November 8, 1984.

Team 1	Agg.	Team 2	1st leg	2nd leg
Efes Pilsen (Turkey)	130–163	(Italy) Banco di Roma	75–73	55–90

==== Semifinals ====
- Day 1 (December 6, 1984)

Team 1	Score	Team 2
Maccabi Elite Tel Aviv (Israel)	95–86	(Italy) Banco di Roma

- Day 2 (December 13, 1984)

Team 1	Score	Team 2
Banco di Roma (Italy)	74–71	(Soviet Union) CSKA Moscow

- Day 3 (January 10, 1985)

Team 1	Score	Team 2
Granarolo Bologna (Italy)	72–73	(Italy) Banco di Roma

- Day 4 (January 16, 1985)

Team 1	Score	Team 2
Banco di Roma (Italy)	89–87	(Socialist Federal Republic of Yugoslavia) Cibona

- Day 5 (January 24, 1985)

Team 1	Score	Team 2
Banco di Roma (Italy)	85–88	(Spain) Real Madrid

- Day 6 (January 31, 1985)

Team 1	Score	Team 2
Banco di Roma (Italy)	90–94	(Israel) Maccabi Elite Tel Aviv

- Day 7 (February 21, 1985)

Team 1	Score	Team 2
CSKA Moscow (Soviet Union)	97–77	(Italy) Banco di Roma

- Day 8 (February 28, 1985)

Team 1	Score	Team 2
Banco di Roma (Italy)	93–84	(Italy) Granarolo Bologna

- Day 9 (March 6, 1985)

Team 1	Score	Team 2
Cibona (Socialist Federal Republic of Yugoslavia)	97–83	(Italy) Banco di Roma

- Day 10 (March 14, 1985)

Team 1	Score	Team 2
Real Madrid (Spain)	97–90	(Italy) Banco di Roma

- Semifinals group stage standings:

Pos.	Team	Pld.	Pts.	W	L	PF	PA	PD	Tie-break
1.	(Socialist Federal Republic of Yugoslavia) Cibona	10	17	7	3	881	826	+55	2–0
2.	(Spain) Real Madrid	10	17	7	3	933	874	+69	0–2
3.	(Israel) Maccabi Elite Tel Aviv	10	16	6	4	861	878	-17	
4.	(Soviet Union) CSKA Moscow	10	14	4	6	823	819	+4	1–1 (+17)
5.	(Italy) Banco di Roma	10	14	4	6	840	882	-42	1–1 (-17)
6.	(Italy) Granarolo Bologna	10	12	2	8	840	899	-59	

=== 1985–86 FIBA Korać Cup, 3rd–tier ===
The 1985–86 FIBA Korać Cup was the 15th installment of the European 3rd-tier level professional basketball club competition FIBA Korać Cup, running from October 2, 1985 to March 27, 1986. The trophy was won by Banco di Roma, who defeated Mobilgirgi Caserta by a result of 157–150 in a two-legged final on a home and away basis. Overall, Banco di Roma achieved in present competition a record of 8 wins against 2 defeats, in five successive rounds.

==== First round ====
- Bye

==== Second round ====
- Bye

==== Top 16 ====
- Day 1 (December 4, 1985)

Team 1	Score	Team 2
Hapoel Tel Aviv (Israel)	92–82	(Italy) Banco di Roma

- Day 2 (December 11, 1985)

Team 1	Score	Team 2
Banco di Roma (Italy)	91–77	(Socialist Federal Republic of Yugoslavia) Bosna

- Day 3 (January 8, 1986)

Team 1	Score	Team 2
ESM Challans (France)	77–78	(Italy) Banco di Roma

- Day 4 (January 15, 1986)

Team 1	Score	Team 2
Banco di Roma (Italy)	93–74	(Israel) Hapoel Tel Aviv

- Day 5 (January 22, 1986)

Team 1	Score	Team 2
Bosna (Socialist Federal Republic of Yugoslavia)	100–96	(Italy) Banco di Roma

- Day 6 (January 29, 1986)

Team 1	Score	Team 2
Banco di Roma (Italy)	107–80	(France) ESM Challans

- Group C standings:

Pos.	Team	Pld.	Pts.	W	L	PF	PA	PD	Tie-break
1.	(Italy) Banco di Roma	6	10	4	2	547	500	+47	1–1 (+9)
2.	(Israel) Hapoel Tel Aviv	6	10	4	2	531	546	-15	1–1 (-9)
3.	(Socialist Federal Republic of Yugoslavia) Bosna	6	9	3	3	581	584	-3	
4.	(France) ESM Challans	6	7	1	5	514	543	-29	

==== Semifinals ====
- Tie played on February 19, 1986 and on February 26, 1986.

Team 1	Agg.	Team 2	1st leg	2nd leg
Olympique Antibes (France)	144–161	(Italy) Banco di Roma	69–78	75–83

==== Finals ====
- Tie played on March 20, 1986 at PalaMaggiò di Castel Morrone in Caserta, Italy and on March 27, 1986 at PalaEUR in Rome, Italy.

Team 1	Agg.	Team 2	1st leg	2nd leg
Mobilgirgi Caserta (Italy)	150–157	(Italy) Banco di Roma	78–84	72–73

== 1990s ==
=== 1991–92 FIBA Korać Cup, 3rd–tier ===
The 1991–92 FIBA Korać Cup was the 21st installment of the European 3rd-tier level professional basketball club competition FIBA Korać Cup, running from October 2, 1991 to March 18, 1992. The trophy was won by Il Messaggero Roma, who defeated Scavolini Pesaro by a result of 193–180 in a two-legged final on a home and away basis. Overall, Il Messaggero Roma achieved in present competition a record of 13 wins against 2 defeats plus 1 draw, in six successive rounds. More detailed:

==== First round ====
- Tie played on October 1, 1991 and on October 9, 1991.

Team 1	Agg.	Team 2	1st leg	2nd leg
Go Pass Verviers-Pepinster (Belgium)	179–203	(Italy) Il Messaggero Roma	89–99	90–104

==== Second round ====
- Tie played on October 30, 1991 and on November 6, 1991.

Team 1	Agg.	Team 2	1st leg	2nd leg
Reims Champagne (France)	125–166	(Italy) Il Messaggero Roma	54–72	71–94

==== Top 16 ====
- Day 1 (November 27, 1991)

Team 1	Score	Team 2
Il Messaggero Roma (Italy)	97–72	(Spain) CAI Zaragoza

- Day 2 (December 4, 1991)

Team 1	Score	Team 2
Il Messaggero Roma (Italy)	84–75	(Greece) Panathinaikos

- Day 3 (December 11, 1991)

Team 1	Score	Team 2
Pitch Cholet (France)	83–69	(Italy) Il Messaggero Roma

- Day 4 (December 18, 1991)

Team 1	Score	Team 2
CAI Zaragoza (Spain)	77–81	(Italy) Il Messaggero Roma

- Day 5 (January 8, 1992)

Team 1	Score	Team 2
Panathinaikos (Greece)	96–99*	(Italy) Il Messaggero Roma

^{*}Overtime at the end of regulation (85–85).

- Day 6 (January 15, 1992)

Team 1	Score	Team 2
Il Messaggero Roma (Italy)	95–88	(France) Pitch Cholet

- Group B standings:

Pos.	Team	Pld.	Pts.	W	L	PF	PA	PD
1.	(Italy) Il Messaggero Roma	6	11	5	1	525	491	+34
2.	(France) Pitch Cholet	6	10	4	2	501	463	+38
3.	(Spain) CAI Zaragoza	6	8	2	4	466	485	-19
4.	(Greece) Panathinaikos	6	7	1	5	465	518	-53

==== Quarterfinals ====
- Tie played on January 28, 1992 and on February 5, 1992.

Team 1	Agg.	Team 2	1st leg	2nd leg
Racing Club de Paris (France)	142–151	(Italy) Il Messaggero Roma	70–71	72–80

==== Semifinals ====
- Tie played on February 19, 1992 and on February 26, 1992.

Team 1	Agg.	Team 2	1st leg	2nd leg
Il Messaggero Roma (Italy)	142–137	(Spain) Fórum Filatélico Valladolid	76–70	66–67

==== Finals ====
- Tie played on March 11, 1992 at PalaEUR in Rome, Italy and on March 18, 1992 at Palasport Comunale in Pesaro, Italy.

Team 1	Agg.	Team 2	1st leg	2nd leg
Il Messaggero Roma (Italy)	193–180	(Italy) Scavolini Pesaro	94–94	99–86

=== 1992–93 FIBA Korać Cup, 3rd–tier ===
The 1992–93 FIBA Korać Cup was the 22nd installment of the European 3rd-tier level professional basketball club competition FIBA Korać Cup, running from September 9, 1992 to March 18, 1993. The trophy was won by Philips Milano, who defeated Virtus Roma by a result of 201–181 in a two-legged final on a home and away basis. Overall, Virtus Roma achieved in present competition a record of 10 wins against 6 defeats, in seven successive rounds. More detailed:

==== First round ====
- Bye

==== Second round ====
- Tie played on October 1, 1992 and on October 7, 1992.

Team 1	Agg.	Team 2	1st leg	2nd leg
Ideal Job Union Neuchâtel (Switzerland)	157–204	(Italy) Virtus Roma	80–107	77–97

==== Third round ====
- Tie played on October 28, 1992 and on November 4, 1992.

Team 1	Agg.	Team 2	1st leg	2nd leg
Spartak Lugansk (Ukraine)	138–167	(Italy) Virtus Roma	72–73	66–94

==== Top 16 ====
- Day 1 (November 25, 1992)

Team 1	Score	Team 2
Virtus Roma (Italy)	85–97	(Greece) Chipita Panionios

- Day 2 (December 2, 1992)

Team 1	Score	Team 2
Virtus Roma (Italy)	97–94	(France) Olympique Antibes

- Day 3 (December 9, 1992)

Team 1	Score	Team 2
Taugrés (Spain)	62–68	(Italy) Virtus Roma

- Day 4 (December 16, 1992)

Team 1	Score	Team 2
Chipita Panionios (Greece)	65–67	(Italy) Virtus Roma

- Day 5 (January 6, 1993)

Team 1	Score	Team 2
Olympique Antibes (France)	82–70	(Italy) Virtus Roma

- Day 6 (January 13, 1993)

Team 1	Score	Team 2
Virtus Roma (Italy)	88–76	(Spain) Taugrés

- Group C standings:

Pos.	Team	Pld.	Pts.	W	L	PF	PA	PD	Tie-break
1.	(Italy) Virtus Roma	6	10	4	2	475	476	-1	
2.	(Greece) Chipita Panionios	6	9	3	3	484	442	+42	1–1 (+11)
3.	(France) Olympique Antibes	6	9	3	3	526	530	-4	1–1 (-11)
4.	(Spain) Taugrés	6	8	2	4	464	501	-35	

==== Quarterfinals ====
- Tie played on January 27, 1993 and on February 3, 1993.

Team 1	Agg.	Team 2	1st leg	2nd leg
Elosúa León (Spain)	173–180	(Italy) Virtus Roma	88–77	85–103

==== Semifinals ====
- Tie played on February 17, 1993 and on February 24, 1993.

Team 1	Agg.	Team 2	1st leg	2nd leg
FC Barcelona Banca Catalana (Spain)	149–163	(Italy) Virtus Roma	64–84	85–79

==== Finals ====
- Tie played on March 9, 1993 at PalaEUR in Rome, Italy and on March 18, 1993 at Forum di Milanofiori in Assago, Italy.

Team 1	Agg.	Team 2	1st leg	2nd leg
Virtus Roma (Italy)	181–201	(Italy) Philips Milano	90–95	91–106

=== 1996–97 FIBA Korać Cup, 3rd–tier ===
The 1996–97 FIBA Korać Cup was the 26th installment of the European 3rd-tier level professional basketball club competition FIBA Korać Cup, running from September 11, 1996 to April 3, 1997. The trophy was won by Aris, who defeated Tofaş by a result of 154–147 in a two-legged final on a home and away basis. Overall, Telemarket Roma achieved in present competition a record of 8 wins against 4 defeats, in five successive rounds. More detailed:

==== First round ====
- Bye

==== Second round ====
- Day 1 (October 2, 1996)

Team 1	Score	Team 2
ZTE (Hungary)	70–83	(Italy) Telemarket Roma

- Day 2 (October 9, 1996)

Team 1	Score	Team 2
Telemarket Roma (Italy)	87–78	(Federal Republic of Yugoslavia) Spartak Subotica

- Day 3 (October 16, 1996)

Team 1	Score	Team 2
Tofaş (Turkey)	86–69	(Italy) Telemarket Roma

- Day 4 (November 6, 1996)

Team 1	Score	Team 2
Telemarket Roma (Italy)	73–58	(Hungary) ZTE

- Day 5 (November 13, 1996)

Team 1	Score	Team 2
Spartak Subotica (Federal Republic of Yugoslavia)	68–90	(Italy) Telemarket Roma

- Day 6 (November 20, 1996)

Team 1	Score	Team 2
Telemarket Roma (Italy)	74–66	(Turkey) Tofaş

- Group I standings:

Pos.	Team	Pld.	Pts.	W	L	PF	PA	PD
1.	(Italy) Telemarket Roma	6	11	5	1	476	426	+50
2.	(Turkey) Tofaş	6	10	4	2	510	424	+86
3.	(Federal Republic of Yugoslavia) Spartak Subotica	6	9	3	3	466	504	-38
4.	(Hungary) ZTE	6	6	0	6	399	507	-108

==== Third round ====
- Tie played on December 4, 1996 and on December 11, 1996.

Team 1	Agg.	Team 2	1st leg	2nd leg
Turismo Andaluz Granada (Spain)	153–164	(Italy) Telemarket Roma	88–70	65–94

==== Top 16 ====
- Tie played on January 15, 1997 and on January 22, 1997.

Team 1	Agg.	Team 2	1st leg	2nd leg
Telemarket Roma (Italy)	154–147	(Greece) Sporting Feidas	78–66	76–81

==== Quarterfinals ====
- Tie played on February 12, 1997 and on February 19, 1997.

Team 1	Agg.	Team 2	1st leg	2nd leg
Telemarket Roma (Italy)	135–154	(Italy) Benetton Treviso	73–63	62–91

=== 1997–98 FIBA Korać Cup, 3rd–tier ===
The 1997–98 FIBA Korać Cup was the 27th installment of the European 3rd-tier level professional basketball club competition FIBA Korać Cup, running from September 10, 1997 to April 1, 1998. The trophy was won by Mash Jeans Verona, who defeated Crvena zvezda by a result of 141–138 in a two-legged final on a home and away basis. Overall, Calze Pompea Roma achieved in present competition a record of 11 wins against 3 defeats, in six successive rounds. More detailed:

==== First round ====
- Bye

==== Second round ====
- Day 1 (October 1, 1997)

Team 1	Score	Team 2
Vojvodina (Federal Republic of Yugoslavia)	66–74	(Italy) Calze Pompea Roma

- Day 2 (October 8, 1997)

Team 1	Score	Team 2
Helios Domžale (Slovenia)	60–71	(Italy) Calze Pompea Roma

- Day 3 (October 22, 1997)

Team 1	Score	Team 2
Calze Pompea Roma (Italy)	72–61	(Israel) Maccabi Rishon LeZion

- Day 4 (November 5, 1997)

Team 1	Score	Team 2
Calze Pompea Roma (Italy)	60–37	(Federal Republic of Yugoslavia) Vojvodina

- Day 5 (November 12, 1997)

Team 1	Score	Team 2
Calze Pompea Roma (Italy)	80–52	(Slovenia) Helios Domžale

- Day 6 (November 19, 1997)

Team 1	Score	Team 2
Maccabi Rishon LeZion (Israel)	67–77	(Italy) Calze Pompea Roma

- Group M standings:

Pos.	Team	Pld.	Pts.	W	L	PF	PA	PD	Tie-break
1.	(Italy) Calze Pompea Roma	6	12	6	0	514	343	+171	
2.	(Israel) Maccabi Rishon LeZion	6	9	3	3	431	417	+14	1–1 (+9)
3.	(Federal Republic of Yugoslavia) Vojvodina	6	9	3	3	378	410	-32	1–1 (-9)
4.	(Slovenia) Helios Domžale	6	6	0	6	389	462	-73	

==== Third round ====
- Tie played on December 10, 1997 and on December 17, 1997.

Team 1	Agg.	Team 2	1st leg	2nd leg
Cherno More (Bulgaria)	134–163	(Italy) Calze Pompea Roma	79–78	55–85

==== Top 16 ====
- Tie played on January 14, 1998 and on January 21, 1998.

Team 1	Agg.	Team 2	1st leg	2nd leg
Calze Pompea Roma (Italy)	139–129	(Spain) Unicaja	74–55	65–74

==== Quarterfinals ====
- Tie played on February 11, 1998 and on February 18, 1998.

Team 1	Agg.	Team 2	1st leg	2nd leg
Aris Moda Bagno (Greece)	158–166	(Italy) Calze Pompea Roma	79–80	79–86

==== Semifinals ====
- Tie played on March 4, 1998 and on March 11, 1998.

Team 1	Agg.	Team 2	1st leg	2nd leg
Mash Jeans Verona (Italy)	166–154	(Italy) Calze Pompea Roma	96–82	70–72

=== 1998–99 FIBA Korać Cup, 3rd–tier ===
The 1998–99 FIBA Korać Cup was the 28th installment of the European 3rd-tier level professional basketball club competition FIBA Korać Cup, running from September 16, 1998 to March 31, 1999. The trophy was won by FC Barcelona, who defeated Adecco Estudiantes by a result of 174–163 in a two-legged final on a home and away basis. Overall, Aeroporti di Roma Virtus achieved in present competition a record of 7 wins against 3 defeats, in four successive rounds. More detailed:

==== First round ====
- Bye

==== Second round ====
- Day 1 (October 7, 1998)

Team 1	Score	Team 2
Aeroporti di Roma Virtus (Italy)	102–75	(Slovenia) Krka

- Day 2 (October 14, 1998)

Team 1	Score	Team 2
Aeroporti di Roma Virtus (Italy)	65–59	(Israel) Hapoel Galil Elyon

- Day 3 (October 21, 1998)

Team 1	Score	Team 2
Lovćen (Federal Republic of Yugoslavia)	63–71	(Italy) Aeroporti di Roma Virtus

- Day 4 (November 4, 1998)

Team 1	Score	Team 2
Krka (Slovenia)	85–70	(Italy) Aeroporti di Roma Virtus

- Day 5 (November 11, 1998)

Team 1	Score	Team 2
Hapoel Galil Elyon (Israel)	75–77	(Italy) Aeroporti di Roma Virtus

- Day 6 (November 18, 1998)

Team 1	Score	Team 2
Aeroporti di Roma Virtus (Italy)	92–67	(Federal Republic of Yugoslavia) Lovćen

- Group M standings:

Pos.	Team	Pld.	Pts.	W	L	PF	PA	PD	Tie-break
1.	(Italy) Aeroporti di Roma Virtus	6	11	5	1	477	424	+53	1–1 (+12)
2.	(Slovenia) Krka	6	11	5	1	465	426	+39	1–1 (-12)
3.	(Federal Republic of Yugoslavia) Lovćen	6	7	1	5	414	466	-52	1–1 (+8)
4.	(Israel) Hapoel Galil Elyon	6	7	1	5	444	484	-40	1–1 (-8)

==== Third round ====
- Tie played on December 9, 1998 and on December 16, 1998.

Team 1	Agg.	Team 2	1st leg	2nd leg
Okapi Aalst (Belgium)	147–158	(Italy) Aeroporti di Roma Virtus	64–70	83–88

==== Top 16 ====
- Tie played on January 13, 1999 and on January 20, 1999.

Team 1	Agg.	Team 2	1st leg	2nd leg
Aeroporti di Roma Virtus (Italy)	156–164	(Russia) Arsenal Tula	79–83	77–81

== 2000s ==
=== 1999–2000 FIBA Korać Cup, 3rd–tier ===
The 1999–2000 FIBA Korać Cup was the 29th installment of the European 3rd-tier level professional basketball club competition FIBA Korać Cup, running from September 15, 1999 to March 29, 2000. The trophy was won by Limoges CSP, who defeated Unicaja by a result of 131–118 in a two-legged final on a home and away basis. Overall, Aeroporti di Roma Virtus achieved in present competition a record of 10 wins against 2 defeats, in five successive rounds. More detailed:

==== First round ====
- Bye

==== Second round ====
- Day 1 (October 6, 1999)

Team 1	Score	Team 2
Aeroporti di Roma Virtus (Italy)	73–68	(Israel) Hapoel Galil Elyon

- Day 2 (October 13, 1999)

Team 1	Score	Team 2
Aeroporti di Roma Virtus (Italy)	62–48	(Turkey) Beşiktaş

- Day 3 (October 20, 1999)

Team 1	Score	Team 2
AŠK Inter Slovnaft (Slovakia)	64–83	(Italy) Aeroporti di Roma Virtus

- Day 4 (November 3, 1999)

Team 1	Score	Team 2
Hapoel Galil Elyon (Israel)	66–79	(Italy) Aeroporti di Roma Virtus

- Day 5 (November 10, 1999)

Team 1	Score	Team 2
Beşiktaş (Turkey)	67–74*	(Italy) Aeroporti di Roma Virtus

^{*}Overtime at the end of regulation (63–63).

- Day 6 (November 17, 1999)

Team 1	Score	Team 2
Aeroporti di Roma Virtus (Italy)	80–68	(Slovakia) AŠK Inter Slovnaft

- Group M standings:

Pos.	Team	Pld.	Pts.	W	L	PF	PA	PD
1.	(Italy) Aeroporti di Roma Virtus	6	12	6	0	451	381	+71
2.	(Israel) Hapoel Galil Elyon	6	10	4	2	455	445	+10
3.	(Turkey) Beşiktaş	6	8	2	4	397	410	-13
4.	(Slovakia) AŠK Inter Slovnaft	6	6	0	6	407	474	-67

==== Third round ====
- Tie played on December 8, 1999 and on December 15, 1999.

Team 1	Agg.	Team 2	1st leg	2nd leg
Lokomotiv Mineralnye Vody (Russia)	131–155	(Italy) Aeroporti di Roma Virtus	72–69	59–86

==== Top 16 ====
- Tie played on January 12, 2000 and on January 19, 2000.

Team 1	Agg.	Team 2	1st leg	2nd leg
Aeroporti di Roma Virtus (Italy)	143–139	(Poland) Pogoń Ruda Śląska	66–64	77–75

==== Quarterfinals ====
- Tie played on February 9, 2000 and on February 16, 2000.

Team 1	Agg.	Team 2	1st leg	2nd leg
Casademont Girona (Spain)	139–133	(Italy) Aeroporti di Roma Virtus	61–67	78–66

=== 2003–04 Euroleague, 1st–tier ===
The 2003–04 Euroleague was the 4th season of the EuroLeague, under the newly formed Euroleague Basketball Company's authority, and it was the 47th installment of the European top-tier level professional club competition for basketball clubs, running from November 6, 2003 to May 1, 2004. The trophy was won by Maccabi Elite Tel Aviv, who defeated Skipper Bologna by a result of 118–74 at Nokia Arena in Tel Aviv, Israel. Overall, Lottomatica Roma achieved in present competition a record of 4 wins against 10 defeats, in only one round. More detailed:

==== Regular season ====
- Day 1 (November 3, 2003)

Team 1	Score	Team 2
Lottomatica Roma (Italy)	59–61	(Spain) FC Barcelona

- Day 2 (November 13, 2003)

Team 1	Score	Team 2
AEK (Greece)	79–77	(Italy) Lottomatica Roma

- Day 3 (November 20, 2003)

Team 1	Score	Team 2
Lottomatica Roma (Italy)	63–77	(Serbia and Montenegro) Partizan Mobtel

- Day 4 (November 26, 2003)

Team 1	Score	Team 2
Ülker (Turkey)	67–63	(Italy) Lottomatica Roma

- Day 5 (December 4, 2003)

Team 1	Score	Team 2
Lottomatica Roma (Italy)	80–79	(Slovenia) Union Olimpija

- Day 6 (December 11, 2003)

Team 1	Score	Team 2
Lottomatica Roma (Italy)	80–72	(Croatia) Cibona VIP

- Day 7 (December 18, 2003)

Team 1	Score	Team 2
Pau-Orthez (France)	106–110*	(Italy) Lottomatica Roma

^{*}Overtime at the end of regulation (91–91).

- Day 8 (January 7, 2004)

Team 1	Score	Team 2
FC Barcelona (Spain)	86–65	(Italy) Lottomatica Roma

- Day 9 (January 15, 2004)

Team 1	Score	Team 2
Lottomatica Roma (Italy)	70–73	(Greece) AEK

- Day 10 (January 22, 2004)

Team 1	Score	Team 2
Partizan Mobtel (Serbia and Montenegro)	73–81	(Italy) Lottomatica Roma

- Day 11 (January 28, 2004)

Team 1	Score	Team 2
Lottomatica Roma (Italy)	53–69	(Turkey) Ülker

- Day 12 (February 5, 2004)

Team 1	Score	Team 2
Union Olimpija (Slovenia)	87–68	(Italy) Lottomatica Roma

- Day 13 (February 12, 2004)

Team 1	Score	Team 2
Cibona VIP (Croatia)	82–55	(Italy) Lottomatica Roma

- Day 14 (February 19, 2004)

Team 1	Score	Team 2
Lottomatica Roma (Italy)	73–80	(France) Pau-Orthez

- Group A standings:

Pos.	Team	Pld.	W	L	PF	PA	PD	Tie-break
1.	(Spain) FC Barcelona	14	12	2	1086	937	+149	
2.	(Croatia) Cibona VIP	14	8	6	1122	1101	+21	1–1 (+5)
3.	(Turkey) Ülker	14	8	6	1023	1050	-27	1–1 (-5)
4.	(Slovenia) Union Olimpija	14	6	8	1093	1123	-30	4–2
5.	(France) Pau-Orthez	14	6	8	1141	1130	+11	3–3 (+2)
6.	(Greece) AEK	14	6	8	1066	1099	-33	3–3 (-2)
7.	(Serbia and Montenegro) Partizan Mobtel	14	6	8	1081	1078	+3	2–4
8.	(Italy) Lottomatica Roma	14	4	10	997	1091	-94	

=== 2005–06 ULEB Cup, 2nd–tier ===
The 2005–06 ULEB Cup was the 4th installment of ULEB's 2nd-tier level European-wide professional club basketball competition ULEB Cup (lately called EuroCup Basketball), running from November 8, 2005 to April 11, 2006. The trophy was won by Dynamo Moscow, who defeated Aris TT Bank by a result of 73–60 at Spiroudome in Charleroi, Belgium. Overall, Lottomatica Roma achieved in the present competition a record of 8 wins against 6 defeats, in three successive rounds. More detailed:

==== Regular season ====
- Day 1 (November 8, 2005)

Team 1	Score	Team 2
Deutsche Bank Skyliners (Germany)	50–54	(Italy) Lottomatica Roma

- Day 2 (November 15, 2005)

Team 1	Score	Team 2
Lottomatica Roma (Italy)	72–97	(Russia) Dynamo Moscow

- Day 3 (November 22, 2005)

Team 1	Score	Team 2
Lottomatica Roma (Italy)	91–94	(Israel) Hapoel Migdal Jerusalem

- Day 4 (November 29, 2005)

Team 1	Score	Team 2
Crvena zvezda (Serbia and Montenegro)	89–72	(Italy) Lottomatica Roma

- Day 5 (December 6, 2005)

Team 1	Score	Team 2
Lottomatica Roma (Italy)	65–78	(France) Le Mans Sarthe

- Day 6 (December 13, 2005)

Team 1	Score	Team 2
Lottomatica Roma (Italy)	86–76	(Germany) Deutsche Bank Skyliners

- Day 7 (December 20, 2005)

Team 1	Score	Team 2
Dynamo Moscow (Russia)	82–70	(Italy) Lottomatica Roma

- Day 8 (January 3, 2006)

Team 1	Score	Team 2
Hapoel Migdal Jerusalem (Israel)	84–95	(Italy) Lottomatica Roma

- Day 9 (January 10, 2006)

Team 1	Score	Team 2
Lottomatica Roma (Italy)	94–88	(Serbia and Montenegro) Crvena zvezda

- Day 10 (January 17, 2006)

Team 1	Score	Team 2
Le Mans Sarthe (France)	67–83	(Italy) Lottomatica Roma

- Group A standings:

Pos.	Team	Pld.	W	L	PF	PA	PD	Tie-break
1.	(Russia) Dynamo Moscow	10	8	2	804	707	+97	
2.	(Israel) Hapoel Migdal Jerusalem	10	7	3	859	823	+36	
3.	(Serbia and Montenegro) Crvena zvezda	10	5	5	837	794	+43	3–1
4.	(Italy) Lottomatica Roma	10	5	5	782	805	-23	2–2
5.	(France) Le Mans Sarthe	10	5	5	766	728	+38	1–3
6.	(Germany) Deutsche Bank Skyliners	10	0	10	625	816	-191	

==== Top 16 ====
- Tie played on January 31, 2006 and on February 7, 2006.

Team 1	Agg.	Team 2	1st leg	2nd leg
Lottomatica Roma (Italy)	165–156	(Russia) UNICS	91–86	74–70

==== Quarterfinals ====
- Tie played on February 28, 2006 and on March 7, 2006.

Team 1	Agg.	Team 2	1st leg	2nd leg
Lottomatica Roma (Italy)	148–158	(Israel) Hapoel Migdal Jerusalem	92–84	56–74

=== 2006–07 Euroleague, 1st–tier ===
The 2006–07 Euroleague was the 7th season of the EuroLeague, under the Euroleague Basketball Company's authority, and it was the 50th installment of the European top-tier level professional club competition for basketball clubs, running from October 26, 2006 to May 6, 2007. The trophy was won by Panathinaikos, who defeated the title holder CSKA Moscow by a result of 93–91 at O.A.C.A. Olympic Indoor Hall in Athens, Greece. Overall, Lottomatica Roma achieved in present competition a record of 7 wins against 13 defeats, in two successive rounds. More detailed:

==== Regular season ====
- Day 1 (October 25, 2006)

Team 1	Score	Team 2
Lottomatica Roma (Italy)	65–60	(Serbia) Partizan

- Day 2 (November 1, 2006)

Team 1	Score	Team 2
Union Olimpija (Slovenia)	83–72	(Italy) Lottomatica Roma

Record	Round	Opponent club		
2006–07 Euroleague 1st–tier
7–13	Regular season	(Serbia) Partizan	65–60 h	63–73 a
7–13	Regular season	(Slovenia) Union Olimpija	72–83 a	84–74 h
7–13	Regular season	(Israel) Maccabi Elite Tel Aviv	65–78 a	88–81 h
7–13	Regular season	(Greece) Panathinaikos	71–87 a	69–79 h
7–13	Regular season	(Spain) DKV Joventut	71–69 h	83–72 a
7–13	Regular season	(Spain) Unicaja	65–71 h	66–68 a
7–13	Regular season	(Croatia) Cibona VIP	84–91 a	81–58 h
7–13	Top 16	(France) Pau-Orthez	78–68 h	69–74 a
7–13	Top 16	(Israel) Maccabi Elite Tel Aviv	69–71 h	72–79 a
7–13	Top 16	(Spain) Tau Cerámica	56–99 a	72–77 h
2007–08 Euroleague 1st–tier
8–12	Regular season	(Greece) Panathinaikos	83–86 a	85–67 h
8–12	Regular season	(Spain) Real Madrid	83–89 a	69–64 h
8–12	Regular season	(Turkey) Fenerbahçe Ülker	66–85 a	63–84 h
8–12	Regular season	(Germany) Brose Baskets	81–57 h	73–59 a
8–12	Regular season	(Serbia) Partizan Igokea	86–91 a	88–87 h
8–12	Regular season	(Spain) AXA FC Barcelona	65–74 h	77–75 a
8–12	Regular season	(France) Chorale Roanne	85–104 a	67–74 h
8–12	Top 16	(Russia) CSKA Moscow	71–72 a	54–82 h
8–12	Top 16	(Spain) Unicaja	75–67 h	58–79 a
8–12	Top 16	(Spain) AXA FC Barcelona	57–86 a	68–63 h
2008–09 Euroleague 1st–tier
7–9	Regular season	(Germany) Alba Berlin	63–68 a	70–64 h
7–9	Regular season	(Spain) DKV Joventut	85–71 h	93–97 a
7–9	Regular season	(Slovenia) Union Olimpija	78–67 a	74–69 h
7–9	Regular season	(Spain) Tau Cerámica	93–90 a	96–103 h
7–9	Regular season	(Turkey) Fenerbahçe Ülker	76–67 h	86–90 a
7–9	Top 16	(Spain) Unicaja	75–88 h	64–99 a
7–9	Top 16	(Serbia) Partizan Igokea	76–84 a	88–72 h
7–9	Top 16	(Greece) Panathinaikos	67–92 a	71–90 h
2009–10 Euroleague 1st–tier
4–6	Regular season	(Spain) Caja Laboral	77–65 h	60–67 a
4–6	Regular season	(Russia) CSKA Moscow	74–69 a	57–72 h
4–6	Regular season	(Greece) Maroussi	83–71 a	74–87 h
4–6	Regular season	(Israel) Maccabi Electra Tel Aviv	90–92 h	59–79 a
4–6	Regular season	(Slovenia) Union Olimpija	70–87 a	69–48 h
2010–11 Euroleague 1st–tier
7–9	Regular season	(Germany) Brose Baskets	83–65 h	68–67 a
7–9	Regular season	(Belgium) Spirou	64–55 a	95–83 h
7–9	Regular season	(Spain) Real Madrid	56–74 h	50–72 a
7–9	Regular season	(Spain) Unicaja	83–104 a	81–75 h
7–9	Regular season	(Greece) Olympiacos	71–86 h	82–89 a
7–9	Top 16	(Slovenia) Union Olimpija	63–64 h	87–76 a
7–9	Top 16	(Israel) Maccabi Electra Tel Aviv	58–99 a	82–69 h
7–9	Top 16	(Spain) Regal FC Barcelona	56–80 a	65–74 h
2013–14 Eurocup 2nd–tier
3–7	Regular season	(France) Gravelines-Dunkerque	69–75 h	64–74 a
3–7	Regular season	(Belgium) Belfius Mons-Hainaut	88–76 a	60–61 h
3–7	Regular season	(Germany) Alba Berlin	85–71 h	81–84 a
3–7	Regular season	(Spain) CAI Zaragoza	68–74 a	83–81 h
3–7	Regular season	(Germany) Telekom Baskets Bonn	75–85 h	88–96 a
2014–15 Eurocup 2nd–tier
12–6	Regular season	(Belgium) Proximus Spirou	88–59 a	100–69 h
12–6	Regular season	(France) SLUC Nancy	84–79 h	76–64 a
12–6	Regular season	(Spain) Sevilla	84–82 h	80–98 a
12–6	Regular season	(Czech Republic) ČEZ Nymburk	87–89 a	78–72 h
12–6	Regular season	(Germany) EWE Baskets Oldenburg	83–81 h	66–80 a
12–6	Top 32	(Russia) Krasny Oktyabr	82–66 h	88–86 a
12–6	Top 32	(Spain) CAI Zaragoza	53–67 a	87–66 h
12–6	Top 32	(Croatia) Cedevita	73–66 h	90–91 a
12–6	Top 16	(Turkey) Banvit	55–71 a	66–56 h

== Worldwide competitions ==
Record	Round	Opponent club	
1984 FIBA Intercontinental Cup
3–1	League stage	(Brazil) Sírio	100–88; September 20, Ginásio do Ibirapuera, São Paulo
3–1	League stage	(Argentina) Obras Sanitarias	73–71; September 21, Ginásio do Ibirapuera, São Paulo
3–1	League stage	(Spain) FC Barcelona	86–85; September 22, Ginásio do Ibirapuera, São Paulo
3–1	League stage	(United States) Lexington Marathon Oil	92–112; September 23, Ginásio do Ibirapuera, São Paulo
1985 FIBA Club World Cup
1–3	Group stage	(United States) Golden Eagles	76–87; June 23, Girona
1–3	Group stage	(Brazil) Monte Líbano	82–92; June 24, Girona
1–3	Group stage	(Philippines) Northern Cement	79–98; June 26, Girona
1–3	Group stage	(Socialist Federal Republic of Yugoslavia) Cibona	101–98; June 27, Girona
