= 1994–95 FIBA Korać Cup =

- League: FIBA Korać Cup
- Sport: Basketball

Finals
- Champions: (Germany) Alba Berlin
- Runners-up: (Italy) Stefanel Milano

FIBA Korać Cup seasons
- ← 1993–94 1995–96 →

The 1994–95 FIBA Korać Cup was the 24th edition of FIBA's Korać Cup basketball competition. The German Alba Berlin defeated the Italian Stefanel Milano in the final. This was the first time a German team won the title.

== Team allocation ==
The labels in the parentheses show how each team qualified for the place of its starting round:

- 1st, 2nd, 3rd, etc.: League position after Playoffs
- CW: Domestic cup winner
- WC: Wild card

Third round
(France) Pau-Orthez (3rd)	(Italy) Stefanel Milano (5th)		
Second round
(Spain) Estudiantes Argentaria (4th)	(Greece) Chipita Panionios (4th)	(Italy) Birex Scaligera Verona (4th)	(Russia) Spartak Moscow (6th)
(Spain) Cáceres (5th)	(Greece) Nikas Peristeri (5th)	(Italy) Filodoro Fortitudo Bologna (6th)	(Turkey) Ülker Genclik (2nd)
(Spain) Caja San Fernando (6th)	(Greece) Aris Intersalonica (7th)	(France) PSG Racing Basket (4th)	(Turkey) Galatasaray (5th)
(Spain) TDK Manresa (7th)	(Israel) Bnei Herzliya (4th)	(France) Pitch Cholet (6th)	(Belgium) Spirou Charleroi (2nd)
(Croatia) Zrinjevac (4th)	(Israel) Hapoel Eilat (5th)	(Germany) Alba Berlin (4th)	(North Macedonia) Kočani Delikates (2nd)
Croatia Line Rijeka (6th)	(Israel) Maccabi Rishon LeZion (7th)	(Germany) SSV Ulm (5th)	(Ukraine) Mykolaiv (6th)
(Croatia) Šibenka (7th)	(Italy) illycaffè Trieste (3rd)	(Russia) Dynamo Moscow (2nd)	
First round
(Czech Republic) Tonak Nový Jičín (2nd)	(Georgia (country)) SK Tbilisi	(Ukraine) Shakhtar Donetsk (4th)	(Bosnia and Herzegovina) Češko (2nd)
(Czech Republic) Sparta Praha (3rd)	(North Macedonia) Makedonija '91 Strumica	(Ukraine) CSK-Mercury Kyiv (8th)	(Bulgaria) Kompakt (2nd)
(Czech Republic) USK Praha (5th)	(North Macedonia) Nemetali Strumica	(Austria) Volksbank Swans Gmunden (4th)	(Croatia) Franck Dona (5th)
(Czech Republic) Nova Hut Ostrava (6th)	(North Macedonia) Vardar	(Austria) Sparkasse Aflenz (5th)	(Cyprus) Achilleas Kaimakli (3rd)
(Hungary) ZTE (2nd)	(Portugal) Beira-Mar	(Germany) BG Bramsche/Osnabrück (7th)	(Denmark) Aarhus
(Hungary) Soproni Aszok (4th)	(Portugal) CA Queluz	(Germany) TVG Trier (10th)	(England) Manchester Giants (3rd)
(Hungary) MOL Szolnoki Olaj (5th)	(Portugal) Sangalhos DC	(Romania) CSU Forest Sibiu	(Estonia) Kalev/Auma
(Hungary) Albacomp Fehérvár (6th)	(Poland) Stal Bobrek Bytom (4th)	(Romania) Elba Universitatea Timişoara	(Finland) Lahden NMKY (CW)
(Lithuania) Lavera (3rd)	(Poland) Mazowszanka (9th)	(Russia) CSK VVS (3rd)	(France) JDA Dijon (9th)
(Lithuania) Statyba (4th)	(Poland) Polonia Przemyśl (1st, I Liga)^{WC}	(Russia) Stroitel Samara (5th)	(Iceland) UMFG (1st)
(Lithuania) Neca (5th)	(Slovakia) Ozeta Trenčín (3rd)	(Sweden) Plannja (7th)	(Israel) Hapoel Galil Elyon (6th)
(Lithuania) Policijos Akademija - Sakalai (1st, LAKL)^{WC}	(Slovakia) VŠDS Žilina (4th)	(Sweden) Borås (WC)	(Latvia) VEF Metropole-Adazhi Riga
(Belgium) Goodyear-Belgacom Aalstar (3rd)	(Slovakia) Baník Handlová (6th)	(Switzerland) Genève Basket	(Luxembourg) Sparta Bertrange
(Belgium) Sunair Oostende (4th)	(Slovenia) BWC Maribor (2nd)	(Switzerland) Union Neuchatel	(Moldova) Floare (1st)
(Belgium) Go Pass Verviers-Pepinster (7th)	(Slovenia) Slovenica Koper (6th)	(Turkey) PTT (3rd)	(Netherlands) Den Braven Goba
(Georgia (country)) Merani Tbilisi (2nd)	(Slovenia) Helios Domžale (7th)	(Turkey) Tofaş (6th)	
(Georgia (country)) Cactus Tbilisi (3rd)	(Ukraine) BIPA-Moda Odesa (3rd)	(Albania) Dinamo Tirana	

== First round ==
Team 1	Agg.	Team 2	1st leg	2nd leg
Helios Domžale (Slovenia)	152–206	(Czech Republic) USK Praha	77–100	75–106
Neca (Lithuania)	137–140	(Slovakia) Ozeta Trenčín	72–57	65–83
Floare (Moldova)	158–167	(Romania) Forest Sibiu	94–97	64–70
Polonia Przemyśl (Poland)	182–144	(Slovakia) Baník Handlová	82–69	100–75
Stroitel Samara (Russia)	205–182	(Finland) Lahden NMKY	112–101	93–81
Go Pass Pepinster (Belgium)	184–142	(Denmark) Aarhus	86–54	98–88
Queluz (Portugal)	177–182	(Germany) Bramsche Osnabrück	88–91	89–91
Shakhtar Donetsk (Ukraine)	147–170	(Turkey) PTT	73–89	74–81
Sparkasse Aflenz (Austria)	166–164	(Switzerland) Genève Basket	88–79	78–85
Sparta Bertrange (Luxembourg)	125–204	(France) JDA Dijon	58–102	67–102
Nova Hut Ostrava (Czech Republic)	123–124	(Hungary) ZTE	61–55	62–69
Plannja (Sweden)	151–177	(Lithuania) Lavera	71–87	80–90
Elba Timişoara (Romania)	161–207	(Hungary) Albacomp Fehervar	87–103	84–104
Franck Dona (Croatia)	174–172	(Czech Republic) Tonak Nový Jičín	73–70	101–102
Makedonija Strumica (North Macedonia)	0–40	(Estonia) Kalev/Auma	0–20	0–20
Dinamo Tirana (Albania)	155–186	(Slovenia) Slovenica Koper	64–92	91–94
Achilleas Kaimakli (Cyprus)	146–177	(Israel) Hapoel Galil Elyon	76–89	70–88
Den Braven Goba (Netherlands)	165–139	(Germany) TVG Trier	100–69	65–70
Volksbank Gmunden (Austria)	159–223	(Portugal) Beira-Mar	79–114	80–109
SK Tbilisi (Georgia (country))	177–204	(Lithuania) Statyba	85–110	92–94
Češko (Bosnia and Herzegovina)	81–121	(Poland) Mazowszanka	81–101	0–20
Cactus Tbilisi (Georgia (country))	171–177	(Russia) CSK VVS	82–61	89–116
MOL Szolnoki Olaj (Hungary)	172–169	(Bulgaria) Kompakt	78–75	94–94
Vardar (North Macedonia)	153–167	(Hungary) Soproni	74–90	79–77
Merani Tbilisi (Georgia (country))	149–194	(Ukraine) BIPA-Moda Odesa	73–100	76–94
Union Neuchatel (Switzerland)	128–185	(Belgium) Sunair Oostende	62–104	66–81
Goodyear-Belgacom Aalstar (Belgium)	151–143	(Czech Republic) Sparta Praha	91–75	60–68
BWC Maribor (Slovenia)	173–157	(Slovakia) Žilina	85–83	88–74
Stal Bobrek Bytom (Poland)	160–173	(Lithuania) Sakalai	81–82	79–91
VEF Metropole Riga (Latvia)	156–158	(Ukraine) CSK-Mercury Kyiv	87–85	69–73
UMFG (Iceland)	201–205	(Sweden) Borås	96–108	105–97
Nemetali Strumica (North Macedonia)	120–188	(Turkey) Tofaş	66–95	54–93
Sangalhos DC (Portugal)	165–178	(England) Manchester Giants	81–77	84–101

== Second round ==
Team 1	Agg.	Team 2	1st leg	2nd leg
USK Praha (Czech Republic)	176–175	(Israel) Bnei Herzliya	95–82	81–93
Ozeta Trenčín (Slovakia)	118–178	(Italy) Filodoro Bologna	60–94	58–84
Forest Sibiu (Romania)	127–210	(Russia) Dynamo Moscow	68–91	59–118
Polonia Przemyśl (Poland)	165–169	(Greece) Aris Intersalonica	75–81	90–88
Stroitel Samara (Russia)	169–185	(Germany) SSV Ulm	92–88	77–97
Go Pass Pepinster (Belgium)	145–164	(Spain) Caja San Fernando	71–78	74–86
Bramsche Osnabrück (Germany)	0–40	(Turkey) PTT	0–20	0–20
Sparkasse Aflenz (Austria)	143–206	(France) Pitch Cholet	89–119	54–87
Zrinjevac (Croatia)	161–176	(France) JDA Dijon	85–85	76–91
ZTE (Hungary)	119–155	(Germany) Alba Berlin	60–76	59–79
Lavera (Lithuania)	112–113	(Turkey) Galatasaray	42–49	70–64
Albacomp Fehérvár (Hungary)	151–184	(Spain) TDK Manresa	78–80	73–104
Franck Dona (Croatia)	169–194	(Estonia) Kalev/Auma	88–80	81–114
Slovenica Koper (Slovenia)	168–199	(Israel) Hapoel Galil Elyon	81–89	87–110
Den Braven Goba (Netherlands)	165–180	(Spain) Cáceres	80–80	85–100
Beira-Mar (Portugal)	123–179	(France) PSG Racing Basket	58–77	65–102
Spirou Charleroi (Belgium)	139–145	(Turkey) Ülker	71–54	68–91
Croatia Line Rijeka	157–149	(Lithuania) Statyba	84–69	73–80
Mazowszanka (Poland)	143–173	(Italy) Birex Verona	70–75	73–98
Mykolaiv (Ukraine)	157–166	(Russia) CSK VVS	78–80	79–86
MOL Szolnoki Olaj (Hungary)	140–166	(Greece) Nikas Peristeri	85–92	55–74
Soproni (Hungary)	172–198	(Ukraine) BIPA Moda Odesa	100–101	72–97
Sunair Oostende (Belgium)	131–142	(Israel) Hapoel Eilat	66–69	65–73
Kočani Delikates (North Macedonia)	145–160	(Russia) Spartak Moscow	74–71	71–89
Goodyear-Belgacom Aalstar (Belgium)	167–179	(Italy) illycaffè Trieste	80–89	87–90
BWC Maribor (Slovenia)	164–180	(Israel) Maccabi Rishon LeZion	91–85	73–95
Sakalai (Lithuania)	128–173	(Greece) Chipita Panionios	69–72	59–101
CSK-Mercury Kyiv (Ukraine)	158–176	(Croatia) Šibenka	70–77	88–99
Borås (Sweden)	144–155	(Turkey) Tofaş	76–81	68–74
Manchester Giants (England)	128–143	(Spain) Estudiantes Argentaria	75–80	53–63

== Third round ==
Team 1	Agg.	Team 2	1st leg	2nd leg
USK Praha (Czech Republic)	149–151	(Italy) Filodoro Bologna	69–69	80–82
Dynamo Moscow (Russia)	185–183	(Greece) Aris Intersalonica	99–94	86–89
SSV Ulm (Germany)	153–174	(Spain) Caja San Fernando	70–84	83–91
PTT (Turkey)	161–175	(France) Pitch Cholet	89–96	72–79
JDA Dijon (France)	160–187	(Germany) Alba Berlin	72–81	88–106
Galatasaray (Turkey)	159–170	(Spain) TDK Manresa	80–84	79–86
Kalev/Auma (Estonia)	140–166	(Italy) Stefanel Milano	68–89	72–77
Hapoel Galil Elyon (Israel)	149–172	(Spain) Cáceres	102–83	47–89
PSG Racing Basket (France)	159–189	(Turkey) Ülker	84–96	75–93
Croatia Line Rijeka	148–150	(Italy) Birex Verona	73–73	75–77
CSK VVS (Russia)	175–185	(Greece) Nikas Peristeri	103–91	72–94
Bipa-Moda Odesa (Ukraine)	148–158	(Israel) Hapoel Eilat	54–78	94–80
Spartak Moscow (Russia)	149–164	(Italy) illycaffè Trieste	78–80	71–84
Maccabi Rishon LeZion (Israel)	137–188	(Greece) Chipita Panionios	72–84	65–104
Šibenka (Croatia)	131–168	(France) Pau-Orthez	62–90	69–78
Tofaş (Turkey)	173–196	(Spain) Estudiantes Argentaria	101–91	72–105

== Group stage ==
Key to colors
Top two places in each group advance to quarterfinals

=== Group A ===
Pos	Team	Pld	W	L	PF	PA	PD	Pts	FIL	ULK	MAN	CHO
1	(Italy) Filodoro Bologna	6	4	2	476	453	+23	10	—	82–75	89–81	82–70
2	(Turkey) Ülker	6	4	2	454	425	+29	10	72–68	—	81–75	75–57
3	(Spain) TDK Manresa	6	2	4	484	497	−13	8	72–76	80–92	—	83–75
4	(France) Pitch Cholet	6	2	4	432	471	−39	8	83–79	63–59	84–95	—

Source: FIBA Europe

=== Group B ===
Pos	Team	Pld	W	L	PF	PA	PD	Pts	PAU	ALBA	EST	VER
1	(France) Pau-Orthez	6	5	1	498	460	+38	11	—	78–80	86–77	62–56
2	(Germany) Alba Berlin	6	3	3	482	477	+5	9	82–101	—	107–80	76–66
3	(Spain) Estudiantes Argentaria	6	2	4	465	491	−26	8	79–80	65–63	—	87–74
4	(Italy) Birex Verona	6	2	4	450	467	−17	8	86–91	87–74	81–78	—

Source: FIBA Europe

=== Group C ===
Pos	Team	Pld	W	L	PF	PA	PD	Pts	PAN	TRI	CSF	DYN
1	(Greece) Chipita Panionios	6	5	1	513	444	+69	11	—	90–73	85–59	94–81
2	(Italy) illycaffè Trieste	6	4	2	496	515	−19	10	72–71	—	100–91	95–91
3	(Spain) Caja San Fernando	6	2	4	496	489	+7	8	73–76	83–85	—	108–78
4	(Russia) Dynamo Moscow	6	1	5	490	547	−57	7	87–96	89–71	65–83	—

Source: FIBA Europe

=== Group D ===
Pos	Team	Pld	W	L	PF	PA	PD	Pts	CAC	MIL	EIL	PER
1	(Spain) Cáceres	6	5	1	496	474	+22	11	—	70–67	91–75	71–70
2	(Italy) Stefanel Milano	6	3	3	503	451	+52	9	86–93	—	80–71	98–52
3	(Israel) Hapoel Eilat	6	2	4	480	496	−16	8	90–80	74–82	—	82–87
4	(Greece) Nikas Peristeri	6	2	4	462	520	−58	8	86–91	91–90	76–88	—

Source: FIBA Europe

== Quarterfinals ==
Team 1	Agg.	Team 2	1st leg	2nd leg
Ülker (Turkey)	145–153	(France) Pau-Orthez	72–65	73–88
Alba Berlin (Germany)	157–153	(Italy) Filodoro Bologna	77–73	80–80
illycaffè Trieste (Italy)	189–200	(Spain) Cáceres	93–82	96–118
Stefanel Milano (Italy)	155–132	(Greece) Chipita Panionios	73–59	82–73

== Semifinals ==
Team 1	Agg.	Team 2	1st leg	2nd leg
Pau-Orthez (France)	161–172	(Italy) Stefanel Milano	76–82	85–90
Alba Berlin (Germany)	167–142	(Spain) Cáceres	93–70	74–72

== Finals ==
Team 1	Agg.	Team 2	1st leg	2nd leg
Stefanel Milano (Italy)	166–172	(Germany) Alba Berlin	87–87	79–85

== Rosters ==
(Germany) Alba Berlin: Henrik Rödl (C), Ademola Okulaja, Teoman Alibegovic, Gunther Behnke; Ingo Freyer, Teoman Öztürk, Stephan Baeck, Sebastian Machowski. Coach: Svetislav Pesic
(Italy) Stefanel Milano: Ferdinando Gentile (C), Dejan Bodiroga, Gregor Fucka, Davide Pessina, Paolo Alberti; Davide Cantarello, Alessandro De Pol, Flavio Portaluppi, Hugo Sconochini. Coach: Bogdan Tanjević

1994–95 FIBA Korać Cup Champions

Alba Berlin
1st title

== See also ==
- 1994–95 FIBA European League
- 1994–95 FIBA European Cup
