= Apollon Patras B.C. in international competitions =

Apollon Patras B.C. in international competitions is the history and statistics of Apollon Patras B.C. in FIBA Europe and Euroleague Basketball Company European-wide professional club basketball competitions.

== 1980s ==
=== 1986–87 FIBA Korać Cup, 3rd–tier ===
The 1986–87 FIBA Korać Cup was the 16th installment of the European 3rd-tier level professional basketball club competition FIBA Korać Cup, running from October 1, 1986, to March 25, 1987. The trophy was won by FC Barcelona, who defeated Limoges CSP in a two-legged final on a home and away basis. Overall, Apollon Patras achieved in present competition a record of 0 wins against 2 defeat, in one round. More detailed:

==== First round ====
- Tie played on October 1, 1986, and on October 8, 1986.

Team 1	Agg.	Team 2	1st leg	2nd leg
Apollon Patras (Greece)	151–205	(Israel) Hapoel Tel Aviv	71–88	80-117

== 1990s ==
=== 1989–90 FIBA Korać Cup, 3rd–tier ===
The 1989–90 FIBA Korać Cup was the 19th installment of the European 3rd-tier level professional basketball club competition FIBA Korać Cup, running from September 27, 1989, to March 28, 1990. The trophy was won by Ram Joventut, who defeated Scavolini Pesaro in a two-legged final on a home and away basis. Overall, Apollon Patras achieved in present competition a record of 0 wins against 2 defeats, in one round. More detailed:

==== First round ====
- Tie played on September 27, 1989, and on October 4, 1989.

Team 1	Agg.	Team 2	1st leg	2nd leg
Apollon Patras (Greece)	134–172	(Israel) Hapoel Tel Aviv	75–79	59-93

=== 1996–97 FIBA EuroCup, 2nd–tier ===
The 1996–97 FIBA EuroCup was the 31st installment of FIBA's 2nd-tier level European-wide professional club basketball competition FIBA EuroCup (lately called FIBA Saporta Cup), running from September 17, 1996, to April 15, 1997. The trophy was won by Real Madrid Teka, who defeated Riello Mash Verona by a result of 78–64 at Eleftheria Indoor Hall in Nicosia, Cyprus. Overall, Dexim Apollon Patras achieved in the present competition a record of 11 wins against 3 defeats, in three successive rounds. More detailed:

==== First round ====
- Day 1 (September 17, 1996)

Team 1	Score	Team 2
Dexim Apollon Patras (Greece)	92–71	(Czech Republic) Stavex Brno

- Day 2 (September 24, 1996)

Team 1	Score	Team 2
Sunair Oostende (Belgium)	74–71	(Greece) Dexim Apollon Patras

- Day 3 (October 1, 1996)

Team 1	Score	Team 2
Dexim Apollon Patras (Greece)	122–61	(Romania) Universitatea Cluj

- Day 4 (October 8, 1996)

Team 1	Score	Team 2
Budivelnyk (Ukraine)	89–79	(Greece) Dexim Apollon Patras

- Day 5 (October 15, 1996)

Team 1	Score	Team 2
Dexim Apollon Patras (Greece)	98–76	(Russia) Akvarius Volgograd

- Day 6 (November 5, 1996)

Team 1	Score	Team 2
Stavex Brno (Czech Republic)	76–84	(Greece) Dexim Apollon Patras

- Day 7 (November 12, 1996)

Team 1	Score	Team 2
Dexim Apollon Patras (Greece)	81–73	(Belgium) Sunair Oostende

- Day 8 (November 19, 1996)

Team 1	Score	Team 2
Universitatea Cluj (Romania)	86–107	(Greece) Dexim Apollon Patras

- Day 9 (December 3, 1996)

Team 1	Score	Team 2
Dexim Apollon Patras (Greece)	85–68	(Ukraine) Budivelnyk

- Day 10 (December 10, 1996)

Team 1	Score	Team 2
Akvarius Volgograd (Russia)	87–105	(Greece) Dexim Apollon Patras

- Group F standings:

Pos.	Team	Pld.	Pts.	W	L	PF	PA	PD	Tie-break
1.	(Greece) Dexim Apollon Patras	10	18	8	2	924	761	+163	1–1 (+7)
2.	(Ukraine) Budivelnyk	10	18	8	2	849	718	+131	1–1 (-7)
3.	(Belgium) Sunair Oostende	10	17	7	3	825	701	+124	
4.	(Czech Republic) Stavex Brno	10	14	4	6	822	815	+7	
5.	(Russia) Akvarius Volgograd	10	13	3	7	760	878	-118	
6.	(Romania) Universitatea Cluj	10	10	0	10	702	1009	-307	

==== Second round ====
- Tie played on January 14, 1997, and on January 21, 1997.

Team 1	Agg.	Team 2	1st leg	2nd leg
Zadar (Croatia)	120–157	(Greece) Dexim Apollon Patras	56–75	64-82

==== Top 16 ====
- Tie played on February 11, 1997, and on February 18, 1997.

Team 1	Agg.	Team 2	1st leg	2nd leg
Türk Telekom PTT (Turkey)	155–140	(Greece) Dexim Apollon Patras	89–73	66–67

=== 1997–98 FIBA EuroCup, 2nd–tier ===
The 1997–98 FIBA EuroCup was the 32nd installment of FIBA's 2nd-tier level European-wide professional club basketball competition FIBA EuroCup (lately called FIBA Saporta Cup), running from September 16, 1997, to April 14, 1998. The trophy was won by Žalgiris, who defeated Stefanel Milano by a result of 82–67 at Hala Pionir in Belgrade, Yugoslavia. Overall, Apollon Achaia Clauss achieved in the present competition a record of 8 wins against 4 defeats, in two successive rounds. More detailed:

==== First round ====
- Day 1 (September 16, 1997)

Team 1	Score	Team 2
USK Erpet Praha (Czech Republic)	86–108	(Greece) Apollon Achaia Clauss

- Day 2 (September 23, 1997)

Team 1	Score	Team 2
Kovinotehna Savinjska Polzela (Slovenia)	110–99	(Greece) Apollon Achaia Clauss

- Day 3 (September 30, 1997)

Team 1	Score	Team 2
Apollon Achaia Clauss (Greece)	90–68	(Croatia) Zrinjevac

- Day 4 (October 7, 1997)

Team 1	Score	Team 2
Apollon Achaia Clauss (Greece)	96–84	(Belgium) Spirou Charleroi

- Day 5 (October 21, 1997)

Team 1	Score	Team 2
Apollon Achaia Clauss (Greece)	107–80	(Netherlands) Libertel Dolphins EBBC

- Day 6 (November 4, 1997)

Team 1	Score	Team 2
Apollon Achaia Clauss (Greece)	99–69	(Czech Republic) USK Erpet Praha

- Day 7 (November 11, 1997)

Team 1	Score	Team 2
Apollon Achaia Clauss (Greece)	84–59	(Slovenia) Kovinotehna Savinjska Polzela

- Day 8 (November 18, 1997)

Team 1	Score	Team 2
Zrinjevac (Croatia)	73–62	(Greece) Apollon Achaia Clauss

- Day 9 (December 9, 1997)

Team 1	Score	Team 2
Spirou Charleroi (Belgium)	87–69	(Greece) Apollon Achaia Clauss

- Day 10 (December 16, 1997)

Team 1	Score	Team 2
Libertel Dolphins EBBC (Netherlands)	79–96	(Greece) Apollon Achaia Clauss

- Group F standings:

Pos.	Team	Pld.	Pts.	W	L	PF	PA	PD
1.	(Belgium) Spirou Charleroi	10	18	8	2	855	710	+145
2.	(Greece) Apollon Achaia Clauss	10	17	7	3	910	795	+115
3.	(Croatia) Zrinjevac	10	16	6	4	836	822	+14
4.	(Slovenia) Kovinotehna Savinjska Polzela	10	15	5	5	859	842	+17
5.	(Netherlands) Libertel Dolphins EBBC	10	13	3	7	761	889	-128
6.	(Czech Republic) USK Erpet Praha	10	11	1	9	730	893	-163

==== Second round ====
- Tie played on January 13, 1998, and on January 20, 1998.

Team 1	Agg.	Team 2	1st leg	2nd leg
Hapoel Eilat (Israel)	180–173	(Greece) Apollon Achaia Clauss	101–84	79–89

=== 1998–99 FIBA Korać Cup, 3rd–tier ===
The 1993–94 FIBA Korać Cup was the 28th installment of the European 3rd-tier level professional basketball club competition FIBA Korać Cup, running from September 16, 1998, to March 31, 1999. The trophy was won by FC Barcelona, who defeated Adecco Estudiantes by a result of 174–163 in a two-legged final on a home and away basis. Overall, Apollon Achaia Clauss achieved in present competition a record of 6 wins against 3 defeats plus 1 draw, in four successive rounds. More detailed:

==== First round ====
- Bye

==== Second round ====
- Day 1 (October 7, 1998)

Team 1	Score	Team 2
Sparta Praha (Czech Republic)	62–85	(Greece) Apollon Achaia Clauss

- Day 2 (October 14, 1998)

Team 1	Score	Team 2
Maccabi Ironi Ra'anana (Israel)	100–83	(Greece) Apollon Achaia Clauss

- Day 3 (October 21, 1998)

Team 1	Score	Team 2
Apollon Achaia Clauss (Greece)	79–67	(Bosnia and Herzegovina) Brotnjo

- Day 4 (November 4, 1998)

Team 1	Score	Team 2
Apollon Achaia Clauss (Greece)	72–64	(Czech Republic) Sparta Praha

- Day 5 (November 11, 1998)

Team 1	Score	Team 2
Apollon Achaia Clauss (Greece)	74–52	(Israel) Maccabi Ironi Ra'anana

- Day 6 (November 18, 1998)

Team 1	Score	Team 2
Brotnjo (Bosnia and Herzegovina)	66–49	(Greece) Apollon Achaia Clauss

- Group G standings:

Pos.	Team	Pld.	Pts.	W	L	PF	PA	PD	Tie-break
1.	(Bosnia and Herzegovina) Brotnjo	6	10	4	2	409	375	+34	2–2 (+4)
2.	(Greece) Apollon Achaia Clauss	6	10	4	2	442	411	+31	2–2 (0)
3.	(Israel) Maccabi Ironi Ra'anana	6	10	4	2	450	409	+41	2–2 (-4)
4.	(Czech Republic) Sparta Praha	6	6	0	6	352	458	-106	

==== Third round ====
- Tie played on December 9, 1998, and on December 16, 1998.

Team 1	Agg.	Team 2	1st leg	2nd leg
Apollon Achaia Clauss (Greece)	155–153	(Israel) Maccabi Rishon LeZion	75–75	80–78

==== Top 16 ====
- Tie played on January 13, 1999, and on January 20, 1999.

Team 1	Agg.	Team 2	1st leg	2nd leg
JDA Dijon (France)	135–122	(Greece) Apollon Achaia Clauss	68–52	67–70

== See also ==
- Greek basketball clubs in international competitions
