= 1998–99 FIBA Korać Cup =

- League: FIBA Korać Cup
- Sport: Basketball

Finals
- Champions: (Spain) FC Barcelona
- Runners-up: (Spain) Adecco Estudiantes

FIBA Korać Cup seasons
- ← 1997–98 1999–00 →

The 1998–99 FIBA Korać Cup was the 28th edition of FIBA's Korać Cup basketball competition. The Spanish FC Barcelona defeated the Spanish Adecco Estudiantes in the final. This was FC Barcelona's second time winning the title following a victory in 1987.

== Team allocation ==
=== Country ranking ===
For the 1998–1999 FIBA Korać Cup, the countries are allocated places according to their place on the FIBA country rankings, which takes into account their performance in European competitions from 1995–96 to 1997–98.

Country ranking for 1998–1999 FIBA Korać Cup

Rank	Country	Points	Teams	Notes
1	Greece	237.000	4	
2	Italy	222.833	4	
3	Spain	194.500	4	
4	Turkey	92.833	4	
5	France	88.667	4	
6	Russia	67.732	4	
7	Yugoslavia	46.333	4	
8	Germany	38.500	4	
9	Croatia	35.542	4	
10	Lithuania	34.667	4	
11	Slovenia	33.714	4	
12	Israel	31.902	4	
13	Poland	21.524	4	
14	Portugal	19.794	4	
15	Belgium	15.929	4	
16	Ukraine	8.905	4	
17	Macedonia	6.542	4	
18	Hungary	6.429	4	
19	Austria	5.417	4	

Rank	Country	Points	Teams	Notes
20	Czech Republic	4.187	4	
21	Cyprus	4.083	3	
22	Slovakia	3.944	3	
23	Sweden	3.667	3	
24	England	3.611	3	
25	Bulgaria	3.722	2	
26	Finland	3.083	2	
27	Netherlands	2.694	2	
28	Bosnia and Herzegovina	2.389	2	
29	Latvia	1.861	1	
30	Estonia	1.778	1	
31	Romania	1.500	1	
32	Luxembourg	1.500	1	
33	Albania	1.500	1	
34	Georgia	1.444	1	
35	Switzerland	1.361	1	
36	Denmark	0.167	1	
37	Belarus	0.111	1	
38	Moldova	0.056	1	
39	Ireland	0.000	1	
40	Wales	0.000	1	
41	Iceland	0,000	1	

=== Teams ===
The labels in the parentheses show how each team qualified for the place of its starting round:

- 1st, 2nd, 3rd, etc.: League position after Playoffs
- WC: Wild card

Regular season
(Greece) Panionios Nutella (5th)	(Spain) Adecco Estudiantes (5th)	(France) Le Mans Sarthe (7th)	(Federal Republic of Yugoslavia) Radnički Jugopetrol (8th)
(Greece) Apollon Achaia Clauss (6th)	(Spain) Unicaja (8th)	(France) Besancon BCD (8th)	(Lithuania) Šiauliai (7th)
(Greece) Iraklio Minoan Lines (7th)	(Spain) Forum Valladolid (9th)	(Russia) Lokomotiv Mineralnye Vody (6th)	(Lithuania) Alita-Savy (8th)
(Greece) Papagou Katselis (8th)	(Turkey) Beşiktaş (5th)	(Russia) Spartak Saint Petersburg (7th)	(Lithuania) Neptunas (9th)
(Italy) Zucchetti Reggiana (4th)	(Turkey) Darüșșafaka (7th)	(Russia) Sport-Akademklub Moscow (8th)	(Germany) UniVersa Bamberg (3rd)
(Italy) Ducato Siena (6th)	(Turkey) Galatasaray (8th)	(Russia) Arsenal Tula (11th)	(Germany) Telekom Baskets Bonn (5th)
(Italy) Aeroporti Di Roma (7th)	(Turkey) Tuborg Pilsner (9th)	(Federal Republic of Yugoslavia) FMP Železnik (2nd)	(Croatia) Benston Zagreb (5th)
(Italy) Pepsi Basket Rimini (8th)	(France) PSG Racing Basket (5th)	(Federal Republic of Yugoslavia) Lovćen (6th)	(Israel) Maccabi Ironi Ra'anana (3rd)
(Spain) FC Barcelona (4th)	(France) JDA Dijon (6th)	(Federal Republic of Yugoslavia) Beobanka (7th)	(Portugal) FC Porto (WC)
Qualifying round
(Poland) Ericsson Bobry Bytom (3rd)	(Cyprus) AEL Limassol (4th)	(Germany) Tatami Rhöndorf (6th)	(Slovakia) Chemosvit (2nd)
(Poland) Komfort Stargard Szczecinski (4th)	(Cyprus) Panathinaikos Limassol (5th)	(Germany) Bayer 04 Leverkusen (8th)	(Slovakia) AŠK Inter Slovnaft (3rd)
(Poland) Pogón Ruda Ślaska (6th)	(Portugal) Oliveirense (3rd)	(Croatia) Svjetlost Brod (6th)	(Finland) Tapiolan Honka (3rd)
(Poland) AZS Elana Torun (8th)	(Portugal) Aveiro Basket	(Croatia) Zrinjevac (8th)	(Finland) Namika Lahti (6th)
(Belgium) Union Mons-Hainaut (3rd)	(Portugal) Benfica	(Slovenia) Krka (4th)	(Romania) Dinamo București (1st)
(Belgium) Okapi Aalstar (4th)	(Bosnia and Herzegovina) Borac Nektar (1st)	(Slovenia) Helios Domžale (8th)	(Romania) CSU Astral Sibiu (2nd)^{WC}
(Belgium) Sunair Ostende (5th)	(Bosnia and Herzegovina) Brotnjo (3rd/4th)	(Israel) Maccabi Rishon LeZion (5th)	(Belarus) Grodno-93 (1st)
(Belgium) Atomics Brussels (8th)	(Bosnia and Herzegovina) Sloboda Dita (3rd/4th)	(Israel) Hapoel Galil Elyon (6th)	(Belarus) RTI-OZAA Osipovichi (3rd)^{WC}
(Austria) Montan Kapfenberg (3rd)	Racing Club Luxembourg (1st)	(Ukraine) Shakhtar Donetsk (4th)	(North Macedonia) Kumanovo (4th)
(Austria) UKJ Möllersdorf Traiskirchen (4th)	(Luxembourg) Residense (WC)	(Ukraine) Azovbasket (WC)	(Sweden) Norrköping Dolphins (1st)
(Austria) UBC Mattersburg 49ers (5th)	(Luxembourg) Sparta Bertrange (WC)	(Hungary) ZTE (6th)	(Bulgaria) Ficosota Shumen (4th)
(Austria) Klosterneuburg Dukes (6th)	(Switzerland) Fribourg Olympic (1st)	(Hungary) Falco Szombathely (7th)	(Netherlands) Ricoh Astronauts (3rd)
(Cyprus) Keravnos Keo (2nd)	(Switzerland) Vacallo Win (2nd)^{WC}	(Czech Republic) Sparta Praha (6th)	(Albania) Vllaznia (1st)
(Cyprus) Achilleas Kaimakli (3rd)	(Switzerland) Lugano Snakes (3rd)^{WC}	(Czech Republic) Nova Hut Ostrava (7th)	(Georgia (country)) Azot Rustavi (1st)

1. Note BIH: After the war in Bosnia, the basketball league in BIH was divided in three parts by ethnicity. Borac Nektar participated as a champion of the league of Republika Srpska, not included for the playoffs for the champion of BIH

== Qualifying round ==
Team 1	Agg.	Team 2	1st leg	2nd leg
Sunair Ostende (Belgium)	174–133	(Portugal) Oliveirense	117–78	57–55
Tatami Rhöndorf (Germany)	205–132	(Luxembourg) Sparta Bertrange	101–67	104–65
Residense (Luxembourg)	93–191	(Slovakia) Inter Slovnaft	39–108	54–83
Namika Lahti (Finland)	154–162	(Sweden) Norrköping Dolphins	88–85	66–77
RTI-OZAA Osipovichi (Belarus)	118–123	(Poland) Komfort Stargard Szczecinski	56–48	62–75
ZTE (Hungary)	149–174	(Switzerland) Fribourg Olympic	79–86	70–88
Möllersdorf Traiskirchen (Austria)	136–139	(Cyprus) Keravnos Keo	71–77	65–62
Brotnjo (Bosnia and Herzegovina)	128–101	(Romania) Dinamo București	78–46	50–55
Achilleas Kaimakli (Cyprus)	127–151	(Czech Republic) Sparta Praha	71–54	56–97
Benfica (Portugal)	164–146	(Switzerland) Vacallo Win	80–74	84–72
Astral Sibiu (Romania)	147–177	(Israel) Maccabi Rishon LeZion	73–83	74–94
Klosterneuburg Dukes (Austria)	156–165	(Belgium) Union Mons-Hainaut	74–75	82–90
Mattersburg 49ers (Austria)	110–175	(Belgium) Okapi Aalstar	50–83	60–92
Lugano Snakes (Switzerland)	144–153	(Czech Republic) Nova Hut Ostrava	76–64	68–85
Vllaznia (Albania)	129–190	(Poland) Ericsson Bobry Bytom	60–89	69–101
Svjetlost Brod (Croatia)	155–157	(Hungary) Falco Szombathely	61–72	94–85
Borac Nektar (Bosnia and Herzegovina)	156–121	(Austria) Montan Kapfenberg	92–56	64–65
Ricoh Astronauts (Netherlands)	116–139	(Portugal) Porto	65–74	51–65
Atomics Brussels (Belgium)	172–143	Racing Club Luxembourg	85–69	87–74
Azot Rustavi (Georgia (country))	179–203	(Ukraine) Shakhtar Donetsk	92–93	87–110
Pogoń Ruda Śląska (Poland)	172–127	(Finland) Kouvot	94–74	78–53
Tapiolan Honka (Finland)	176–175	(Poland) AZS Elana Torun	87–73	89–102
Zrinjevac (Croatia)	198–147	(Cyprus) AEL Limassol	109–68	89–79
Helios Domžale (Slovenia)	132–145	(Bosnia and Herzegovina) Sloboda Dita	64–70	68–75
Aveiro (Portugal)	171–186	(Germany) Bayer 04 Leverkusen	94–100	77–86
Azovbasket (Ukraine)	139–133	(Belarus) Grodno-93	79–54	60–79
Panathinaikos Limassol (Cyprus)	135–191	(Israel) Hapoel Galil Elyon	73–94	62–97
Kumanovo (North Macedonia)	107–139	(Slovenia) Krka	53–64	54–75
Chemosvit (Slovakia)	149–134	(Bulgaria) Ficosota Shumen	76–61	73–73

Source: fibaeurope.com

== Regular season ==
Key to colors
Top two places in each group advance to round of 32

=== Group A ===
	Team	Pld	W	L	PF	PA	PD	Pts
1.	(Turkey) Galatasaray	4	3	1	282	236	+46	7
2.	(Federal Republic of Yugoslavia) Radnički Jugopetrol	4	2	2	301	284	+17	6
3.	(Slovakia) Inter Slovnaft	4	1	3	235	298	−63	5
4.	(Russia) Sport-Akademklub Moscow	0	0	0	0	0	0	0

=== Group B ===
	Team	Pld	W	L	PF	PA	PD	Pts
1.	(Sweden) Norrköping Dolphins	6	4	2	532	488	+44	10
2.	(Lithuania) Alita-Savy	6	4	2	477	466	+11	10
3.	(Russia) Spartak Saint Petersburg	6	3	3	516	508	+8	9
4.	(Poland) Komfort Stargard Szczecinski	6	1	5	431	494	−63	7

=== Group C ===
	Team	Pld	W	L	PF	PA	PD	Pts
1.	(Belgium) Sunair Ostende	6	4	2	509	459	+50	10
2.	(Italy) Zucchetti Reggiana	6	3	3	441	475	−34	9
3.	(Germany) Tatami Rhöndorf	6	3	3	489	461	+28	9
4.	(Spain) Unicaja	6	2	4	420	464	−44	8

=== Group D ===
	Team	Pld	W	L	PF	PA	PD	Pts
1.	(Greece) Panionios Nutella	6	5	1	458	420	+38	11
2.	(Cyprus) Keravnos Keo	6	3	3	405	405	0	9
3.	(Federal Republic of Yugoslavia) FMP Železnik	6	3	3	421	441	−20	9
4.	(Switzerland) Fribourg Olympic	6	1	5	402	420	−18	7

=== Group E ===
	Team	Pld	W	L	PF	PA	PD	Pts
1.	(Turkey) Beşiktaş	6	5	1	480	455	+25	11
2.	(Poland) Ericsson Bobry Bytom	6	3	3	462	445	+17	9
3.	(Italy) Pepsi Rimini	6	2	4	433	453	−20	8
4.	(Hungary) Falco Szombathely	6	2	4	458	480	−22	8

=== Group F ===
	Team	Pld	W	L	PF	PA	PD	Pts
1.	(France) JDA Dijon	6	4	2	502	477	+25	10
2.	(Spain) Forum Valladolid	6	4	2	459	422	+37	10
3.	(Belgium) Union Mons-Hainaut	6	3	3	446	451	−5	9
4.	(Czech Republic) Nova Hut Ostrava	6	1	5	447	504	−57	7

=== Group G ===
	Team	Pld	W	L	PF	PA	PD	Pts
1.	(Bosnia and Herzegovina) Brotnjo	6	4	2	409	375	+34	10
2.	(Greece) Apollon Achaia Clauss	6	4	2	442	411	+31	10
3.	(Israel) Maccabi Ironi Ra'anana	6	4	2	450	409	+41	10
4.	(Czech Republic) Sparta Praha	6	0	6	352	458	−106	6

=== Group H ===
	Team	Pld	W	L	PF	PA	PD	Pts
1.	(Israel) Maccabi Rishon LeZion	6	4	2	490	454	+36	10
2.	(Germany) UniVersa Bamberg	6	4	2	424	416	+8	10
3.	(France) Le Mans Sarthe	6	3	3	475	480	−5	9
4.	(Portugal) Benfica	6	1	5	429	468	−39	7

=== Group I ===
	Team	Pld	W	L	PF	PA	PD	Pts
1.	(Spain) Adecco Estudiantes	6	5	1	496	449	+47	11
2.	(Portugal) Porto	6	4	2	493	463	+30	10
3.	(France) Besancon BCD	6	2	4	437	418	+19	8
4.	(Belgium) Atomics Brussels	6	1	5	411	507	−96	7

=== Group J ===
	Team	Pld	W	L	PF	PA	PD	Pts
1.	(Italy) Ducato Siena	6	4	2	449	359	+90	10
2.	(Croatia) Benston Zagreb	6	4	2	396	417	−21	10
3.	(Bosnia and Herzegovina) Borac Nektar	6	3	3	392	401	−9	9
4.	(Turkey) Tuborg Pilsner	6	1	5	398	458	−60	7

=== Group K ===
	Team	Pld	W	L	PF	PA	PD	Pts
1.	(Germany) Telekom Baskets Bonn	6	4	2	469	439	+30	10
2.	(Greece) Papagou Katselis	6	4	2	456	433	+23	10
3.	(Bosnia and Herzegovina) Sloboda Dita	6	3	3	368	395	−27	9
4.	(Croatia) Zrinjevac	6	1	5	413	439	−26	7

=== Group L ===
	Team	Pld	W	L	PF	PA	PD	Pts
1.	(Lithuania) Šiauliai	6	4	2	538	484	+54	10
2.	(Poland) Pogoń Ruda Śląska	6	4	2	494	453	+41	10
3.	(Russia) Lokomotiv Mineralnye Vody	6	3	3	503	531	−28	9
4.	(Ukraine) Shakhtar Donetsk	6	1	5	495	562	−67	7

=== Group M ===
	Team	Pld	W	L	PF	PA	PD	Pts
1.	(Italy) Aeroporti di Roma Virtus	6	5	1	477	424	+53	11
2.	(Slovenia) Krka	6	5	1	465	426	+39	11
3.	(Federal Republic of Yugoslavia) Lovćen	6	1	5	414	466	−52	7
4.	(Israel) Hapoel Galil Elyon	6	1	5	444	484	−40	7

=== Group N ===
	Team	Pld	W	L	PF	PA	PD	Pts
1.	(Spain) FC Barcelona	6	6	0	515	411	+104	12
2.	(Belgium) Okapi Aalstar	6	3	3	498	524	−26	9
3.	(France) PSG Racing Basket	6	3	3	466	451	+15	9
4.	(Germany) Bayer 04 Leverkusen	6	0	6	409	502	−93	6

=== Group O ===
	Team	Pld	W	L	PF	PA	PD	Pts
1.	(Russia) Arsenal Tula	6	5	1	487	398	+89	11
2.	(Lithuania) Neptunas	6	4	2	522	485	+37	10
3.	(Finland) Tapiolan Honka	6	3	3	449	457	−8	9
4.	(Ukraine) Azovbasket	6	0	6	428	546	−118	6

=== Group P ===
	Team	Pld	W	L	PF	PA	PD	Pts
1.	(Turkey) Darüșșafaka	6	5	1	523	429	+94	11
2.	(Greece) Iraklio Minoan Lines	6	4	2	472	464	+8	10
3.	(Federal Republic of Yugoslavia) Beobanka	6	3	3	482	463	+19	9
4.	(Slovakia) Chemosvit	6	0	6	397	518	−121	6

== Round of 32 ==
Team 1	Agg.	Team 2	1st leg	2nd leg
Radnički Jugopetrol (Federal Republic of Yugoslavia)	177–172	(Sweden) Norrköping Dolphins	107–93	70–79
Alita-Savy (Lithuania)	142–144	(Turkey) Galatasaray	75–70	67–74
Zucchetti Reggiana (Italy)	137–150	(Greece) Panionios Nutella	79–69	58–81
Keravnos Kéo (Cyprus)	124–153	(Belgium) Sunair Oostende	70–73	54–80
Ericsson Bobry Bytom (Poland)	145–150	(France) JDA Dijon	78–79	67–71
Fórum Valladolid (Spain)	157–159	(Turkey) Beşiktaş	76–79	81–80
Apollon Achaia Clauss (Greece)	155–153	(Israel) Maccabi Rishon LeZion	75–75	80–78
UniVersa Bamberg (Germany)	136–137	(Bosnia and Herzegovina) Brotnjo	79–54	57–83
Porto (Portugal)	129–146	(Italy) Ducato Siena	73–63	56–83
Benston Zagreb (Croatia)	108–133	(Spain) Adecco Estudiantes	49–72	59–61
Papagou Katselis (Greece)	138–147	(Lithuania) Šiauliai	74–67	64–80
Pogoń Ruda Śląska (Poland)	148–146	(Germany) Telekom Baskets Bonn	77–70	71–76
Krka (Slovenia)	119–158	(Spain) FC Barcelona	66–75	53–83
Okapi Aalst (Belgium)	147–158	(Italy) Aeroporti di Roma Virtus	64–70	83–88
Neptūnas (Lithuania)	172–191	(Turkey) Darüşşafaka	89–97	83–94
Iraklio Minoan Lines (Greece)	156–163	(Russia) Arsenal Tula	69–69	87–94

== Round of 16 ==
Team 1	Agg.	Team 2	1st leg	2nd leg
Radnički Jugopetrol (Federal Republic of Yugoslavia)	145–169	(Greece) Panionios Nutella	74–88	71–81
Galatasaray (Turkey)	131–143	(Belgium) Sunair Oostende	62–58	69–85
JDA Dijon (France)	135–122	(Greece) Apollon Achaia Clauss	68–52	67–70
Beşiktaş (Turkey)	142–133	(Bosnia and Herzegovina) Brotnjo	84–53	58–80
Ducato Siena (Italy)	151–114	(Lithuania) Šiauliai	85–45	66–69
Adecco Estudiantes (Spain)	159–150	(Poland) Pogoń Ruda Śląska	76–71	83–79
FC Barcelona (Spain)	157–147	(Turkey) Darüşşafaka	83–71	74–76
Aeroporti di Roma Virtus (Italy)	156–164	(Russia) Arsenal Tula	79–83	77–81

== Quarterfinals ==
Team 1	Agg.	Team 2	1st leg	2nd leg
Panionios Nutella (Greece)	161–150	(France) JDA Dijon	87–66	74–84
Sunair Oostende (Belgium)	171–147	(Turkey) Beşiktaş	93–65	78–82
Ducato Siena (Italy)	146–147	(Spain) FC Barcelona	87–71	59–76
Adecco Estudiantes (Spain)	147–122	(Russia) Arsenal Tula	77–59	70–63

== Semifinals ==
Team 1	Agg.	Team 2	1st leg	2nd leg
Panionios Nutella (Greece)	132–171	(Spain) FC Barcelona	71–80	61–91
Sunair Oostende (Belgium)	143–159	(Spain) Adecco Estudiantes	82–84	61–75

== Finals ==
Team 1	Agg.	Team 2	1st leg	2nd leg
Adecco Estudiantes (Spain)	163–174	(Spain) FC Barcelona	93–77	70–97

== Rosters ==
(Spain) Estudiantes: Nacho Azofra (C), Carlos Jimenez, Enrique Barcenas, Alfonso Reyes, Shaun Vandiver; Ignacio De Miguel, Gonzalo Martinez, Felipe Reyes, Pedro Robles, Carlos Brana. Coach: Pepu Hernandez
(Spain) Barcelona : Aleksandar Djordjevic, Roger Esteller (C), Milan Gurovic, Derrick Alston, Efthimios Rentzias; Nacho Rodriguez, Roberto Dueñas, Xavier Fernandez, Oriol Junyent, Juan Carlos Navarro. Coach: Aito Garcia Reneses

1998–99 FIBA Korać Cup Champions

FC Barcelona
2nd title

== See also ==
- 1998–99 FIBA Euroleague
- 1998–99 Saporta Cup
