= Bruno Hamm =

French basketball player

Personal information
- Born: 22 September 1970 (age 56) Strasbourg
- Listed height: 1.85 m (6 ft 1 in)
- Position: Point guard

Career history
- 1989–1994: Strasbourg
- 1994–1995: Pau Orthez
- 1995–1999: Dijon
- 1999–2000: Limoges
- 2000–2001: Cáceres CB
- 2001–2004: Dijon
- 2004–2005: Gries Oberhoffen
- 2005–2006: Lausanne / Orléans
- 2006–2007: Gries Oberhoffen

Career highlights
- French 2nd Division French Player's MVP (1994)

Bruno Hamm, is a former French professional basketball player. At a height of 1.85 m (6 ft 1 in) tall, he played at the point guard position.

== Professional career ==
Hamm was the French 2nd Division French Player's MVP in 1994.

== Clubs ==
- 2000–2001: Cáceres CB (Liga ACB)
- 2001–2004: Jeanne d'Arc Dijon Bourgogne (Pro A)
