= Panathinaikos Limassol B.C. =

Basketball club in Cyprus

Panathinaikos Limassol B.C. is a professional basketball club based in Limassol, Cyprus.

== History ==
The club was founded in 1996 and one season later (1997–98), was promoted to Division A and ranked 5th. During the same season, the club played in the FIBA Korać Cup and was eliminated in the first round by the then runners-up of Crvena zvezda. In the 1999–2000 season, Panathinaikos Limassol reached the Cypriot Basketball Cup finals where it lost 67–72 to Achilleas Kaimakli.

== Honours and achievements ==
- Cypriot Basketball Cup

Runners-up (1): 1999–2000
