= BC CSKA Kyiv =

CSKA Kyiv
- Founded: 1946
- Dissolved: 2005
- Location: Kyiv, Ukraine

BC CSKA Kyiv (Ukrainian: БК "ЦСКА") was a Ukrainian professional basketball club that existed from 1946 till 2005. It was founded in 1946 in the city of Kyiv, Soviet Union.

== History ==
The club was founded in 1946 as SKA Kyiv participating in the Soviet basketball championship. As the Soviet Union fell the club being located in the capital of Ukraine changed its name to CSKA-Riko in 1994 and CSKA-Ukrtatnafta in 1999. In 2001 the club was practically dissolved. After changing its name to VPPO (abbreviation for the Air Defense Forces), the club continued to play in lower divisions until 2005 when it ended its existence.

== Honors and titles ==
- Ukrainian SuperLeague
  - Runner up: 1993, 1999
  - Third: 2000
- Ukrainian Cup:
  - Winners: 1998, 2000
