= HKK Brotnjo =

Basketball team from the town of Čitluk, Bosnia and Herzegovina

Brotnjo Čitluk
- Leagues: A1 liga Herceg-Bosne
- Founded: 1977; 48 years ago
- Arena: Čitluk Sports Hall
- Location: Čitluk, Bosnia and Herzegovina
- Team colors: Blue and white
- Championships: 1
Home	Away

HKK Brotnjo Čitluk (Croatian: Hrvatski košarkaški klub Brotnjo Čitluk, English: Croatian Basketball Club Brotnjo Čitluk) is a basketball team from the town of Čitluk, Bosnia and Herzegovina. It was established in 1977.

The club previously played in the Basketball Championship of Bosnia and Herzegovina and the A1 Liga of Herceg-Bosne. The club also participated in the Korać Cup in 1995 and 1998–99.

== Honours ==
=== League ===
- Basketball Championship of Bosnia and Herzegovina:
  - Winner (1): 1997
- Herzeg-Bosnia Basketball League:
  - Winner (6): 1995, 1996, 1997, 1999, 2000, 2006, 2010, 2013

=== Cups ===
- Basketball Cup of Bosnia and Herzegovina:
  - Winner (1): 1997
  - Runner-up (2): 1999, 2002
- Cup of Herzeg-Bosnia:
  - Winner (4): 1997, 1998, 2000, 2001

== Notable players ==
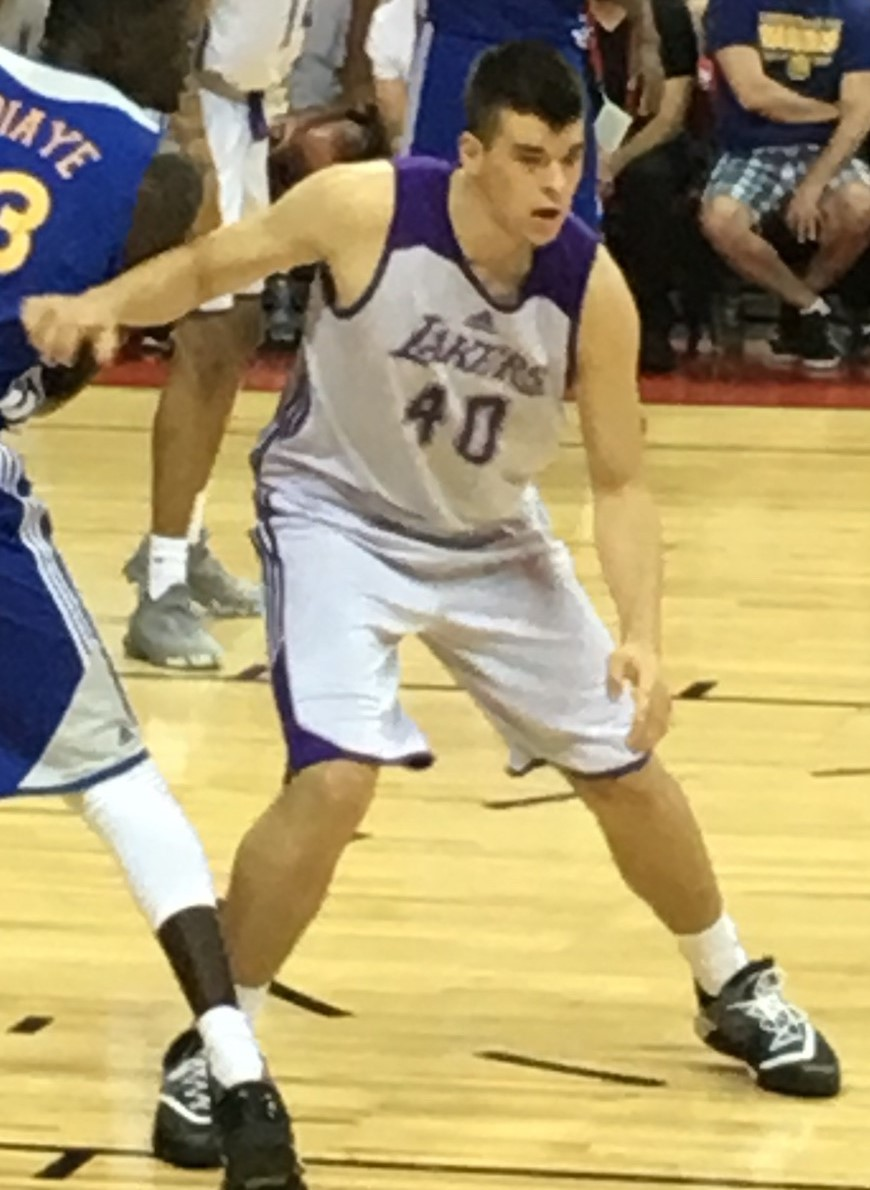
Ivica Zubac started his basketball career in Brotnjo.

Note: Flags indicate national team eligibility at FIBA-sanctioned events. Players may hold other non-FIBA nationalities not displayed.

Criteria

To appear in this section a player must have either:

- Set a club record or won an individual award while at the club
- Played at least one official international match for their national team at any time
- Played at least one official NBA match at any time.

- (Croatia) Ivica Zubac
- (Croatia) Zoran Planinić
