= HKS Bobry Bytom =

Defunct basketball club

- Leagues: PLK
- Founded: 1981
- Dissolved: 2007
- History: List: Stal Bobrek Bytom (1981–1995) Browary Tyskie Bobry (1995–1998) Ericsson Bobry Bytom (1998–2000) Browary Tyskie Bobry (2000–2001) Bobry MOSIR (2001–2002) Bobry Bytom (2002–2007)
- Arena: Josef Wiśniewsky Sports Hall
- Location: Bytom, Poland
Home	Away

HKS Bobry Bytom was a basketball club from Bytom, Poland.

== History ==
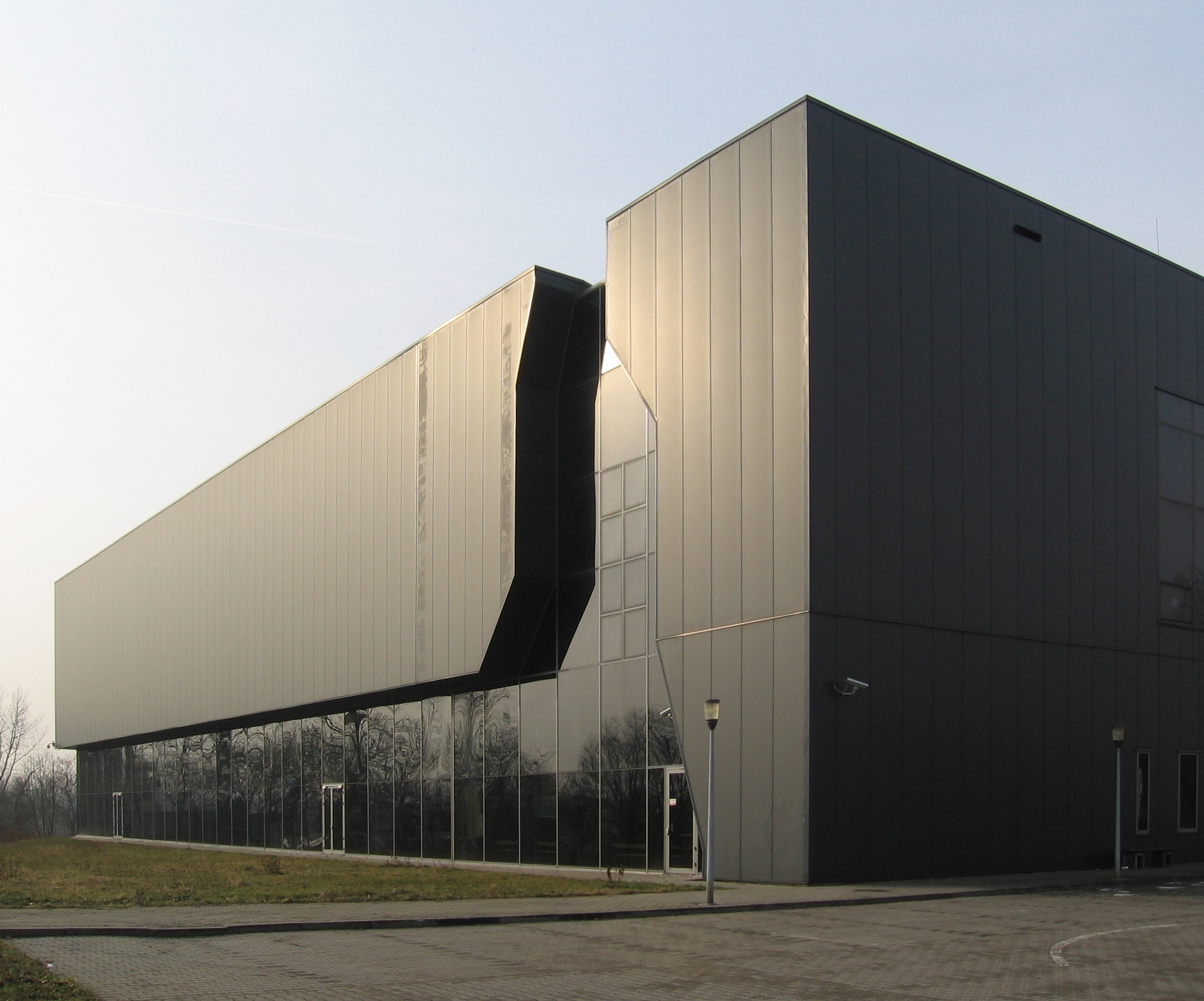
The building of sport hall Józef Wiśniewski Skarpa Sport Centre in Bytom-Szombierki, Frycza-Modrzewskiego street 5, Poland

After dissolving of Polonia Bytom basketball section due to financial difficulties, the management of Huta Bobrek (the polish steel mill) and political organizations and unions operating in the steelworks at that time founded a new basketball club called " HKS Stal Bobrek Bytom" in 1981. The club took Polonia Bytom's place in 1st basketball league of Poland that season.

In 1986, HKS Stal Bobrek took over from K.S. Polonia Bytom another section, this time female basketball, and in 1989 young sections. The end of the 1980s was marked with political and economic changes in the country, as well as the bankruptcy of Huta Bobrek. The club was in financial crisis, but managed to stay in the league. In 1998, Bobry Bytom gains a new strategic sponsor - a well-known company from the telecommunications industry - Ericsson. From the year 2000, club was known as Bobry Bytom. In 2000-2001 season club was relegated to I Liga (second tier), then in 2001-2002 season to the II Liga (third tier). In 2007, the club was dissolved.

HKS Bobry Bytom participated eight times in FIBA Korać Cup and the biggest success was in 1997-1998 season, when team got to the 1/8 finals.

== Achievements ==
Polish League:

- Runners-up (1): 1996
- Third place (4): 1992, 1997, 1998, 1999

Polish Cup :

- Finalist: 1998.
