= Jason Dourisseau =

Dutch-American basketball player

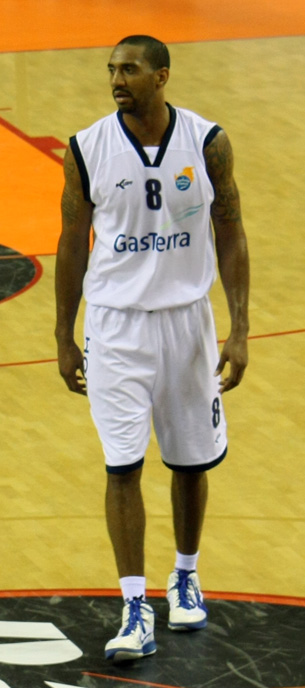
- Dourisseau with Donar in 2011

Donar
- Title: Head coach
- League: BNXT League

Personal information
- Born: December 7, 1983 (age 42) Omaha, Nebraska, U.S.
- Listed height: 6 ft 5 in (1.96 m)
- Listed weight: 200 lb (91 kg)

Career information
- High school: Burke (Omaha, Nebraska)
- College: Nebraska (2002–2006)
- NBA draft: 2006: undrafted
- Playing career: 2006–2023
- Position: Small forward
- Coaching career: 2024–present

Career history

Playing
- 2006–2008: Riesen Ludwigsburg
- 2008–2009: KR
- 2009–2014: GasTerra Flames / Donar
- 2014–2015: s.Oliver Würzburg
- 2015–2020: Donar
- 2023: Aris Leeuwarden

Coaching
- 2024: Donar (assistant)
- 2024–present: Donar

Career highlights
- As player: No. 8 retired by Donar; DBL Most Valuable Player (2011); All-DBL Team (2011); 2× DBL Best Defender of the Year (2013, 2014); 2× DBL All-Defense Team (2014, 2017); 5× DBL champion (2010, 2014, 2016–2018); 4× Dutch Cup winner (2010, 2014, 2017, 2018); 2× Dutch Supercup winner (2015, 2017); Icelandic League champion (2009); Icelandic All-Star Game MVP (2009); Icelandic All-Star (2009); As coach: Dutch Cup winner (2026); ENBL coach of the season (2026)

Jason Richard Dourisseau (born December 7, 1983) is an American-born naturalised Dutch professional basketball coach and former player, who is the current head coach of Donar. As a player, he played at the small forward position.

Following four years playing collegiately at Nebraska, Dourisseau had a 14-year professional career in Europe. He is most known for his playing years with Donar, after he played 10 seasons and won five DBL championships and seven other trophies with the team. The club retired his number 8. Born in Omaha, Nebraska, Dourisseau received a Dutch passport in 2015.

== Early life ==
Born as the son of Richard and Geneva Dourisseau, he grew up in Omaha, Nebraska, and started playing basketball in his garage. Starting from age 5, Dourisseau started playing in YMCA competitions. He won the catholic school championship at the St. Pius X/St. Leo Primary School. He then attended Omaha Burke High School from 2002 to 2006, and was a two-time All-State selection.

== College career ==
Dourisseau played four seasons of college basketball for the Nebraska Cornhuskers. Dourisseau chose Nebraska over Creighton, Iowa State and Saint Louis. He was named to the First-Team Academic All-Big 12 twice, in 2004 and 2005.

== Professional career ==
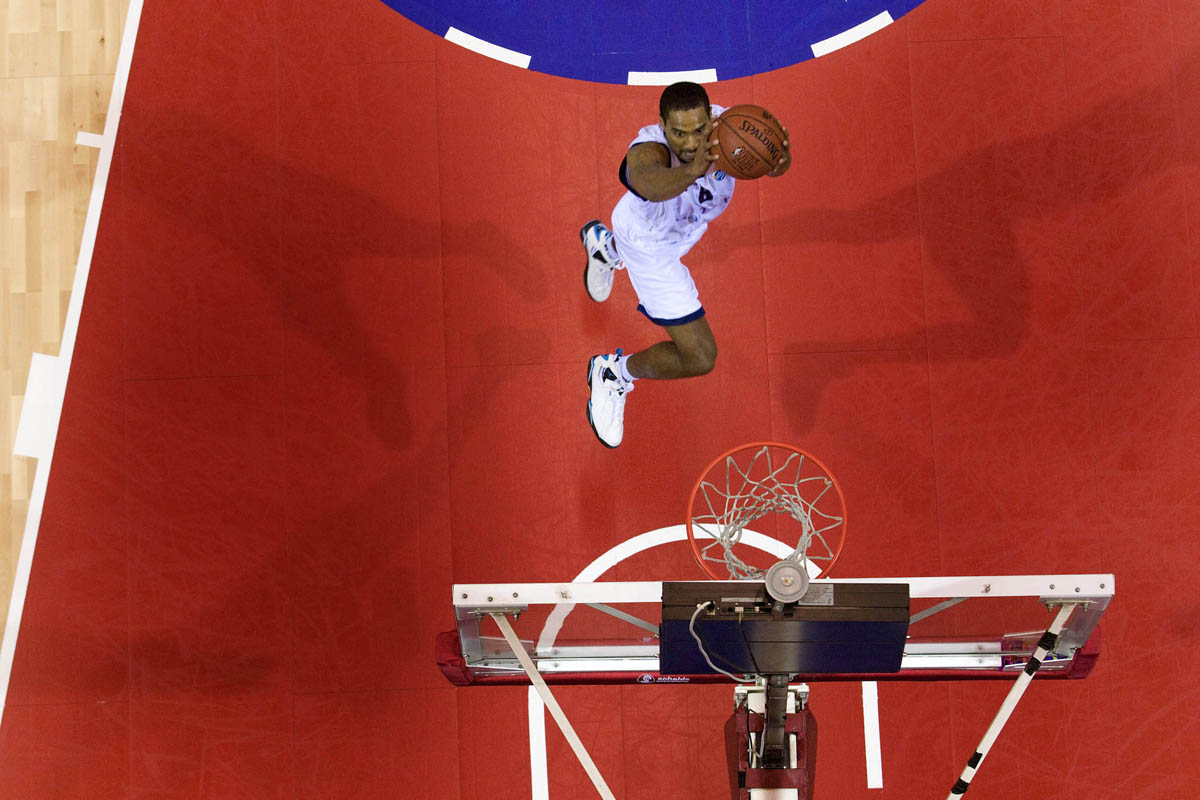
Dourisseau going for a dunk in September 2009

In the 2006–07 season, Dourisseau started his career with Neckar Riesen Ludwigsburg. He reached the Basketball Bundesliga Finals with Ludwigsburg in his first season. In the 2007–08 season, he finished 12th with the team.

In the 2008–09 season, Dourisseau played with KR Basket of the Icelandic Úrvalsdeild karla. Over the season, Dourisseau averaged 16.7 points and 7.6 rebounds per game, while winning the Icelandic Championship and the Company Cup with KR.

For the 2009–10 season, Dourisseau signed with GasTerra Flames of the Dutch Basketball League (DBL). In his first season, he won the Dutch championship. In his second season, he played in the Euroleague qualifying rounds with Flames. The team was eliminated in the first preliminary round against Russian side UNICS. In the 2013–14 season, after Dourisseau won his second Dutch championship, GasTerra Flames announced that one of the stands in home arena MartiniPlaza would be named after him as the "Jason Dourisseau Tribune" (English: Jason Dourisseau Stand).

In the 2014 offseason, Dourisseau signed with s.Oliver Baskets of the ProA, the second tier of basketball in Germany.

On 21 July 2015, Dourisseau returned to Donar, by signing a 2-year deal with the club. In 2017, Dourisseau signed for three more seasons with Donar. He won his fifth DBL championship again in 2018. On 22 June 2020, Donar announced the club and Dourisseau were parting ways.

On October 23, 2021, Donar officially retired Dourisseau's number 8. He became just the second player to have his jersey retired at Donar, after Martin de Vries.

On March 1, 2023, Dourisseau came out of retirement at age 39 when he signed for Aris Leeuwarden for the remainder of the BNXT League season. Coming off the bench, Dourisseau averaged 5.0 points and 3.0 rebounds in his nine games for Aris.

== Coaching career ==
Before 2024–25 season, he started his coaching career and signed with Donar of the BNXT League as an assistant coach.

After a 3–8 start to the season and a 17th place ranking in the BNXT League, head coach Andrej Štimac was released, and Dourisseau was named the interim head coach for the remainder of the 2024–25 season. He coached his team to the Cup Finals, but lost in overtime.

On June 12, 2025, Dourisseau extended his contract with one more season. In his first season as a head coach, he coached his team to a second consecutive cup final in the 2026 Dutch Cup by defeating on the defending champions Heroes Den Bosch in the semi-finals. He then coached the team to a successful final, winning the Cup by defeating Landstede Hammers, to achieve the first prize of his coaching career. The club also played in the regional European competition the European North Basketball League. He coached his team to the quarterfinals, earning him the title of ENBL coach of the year.

== National team career ==
In anticipation of his upcoming Dutch passport, Dourisseau was in the pre-selection of the Dutch national basketball team, as he was selected by Toon van Helfteren on June 13, 2015. Dourisseau later received his passport and made his national team debut on July 15 in a friendly game against Germany. He went on to play four games for the Netherlands in that year.

== Personal ==
In August 2015, Dourisseau officially became a Dutch citizen and stayed in Groningen after his professional basketball career. He is married and has two children.

He has one brother, Devin, and one sister, Dena.

== Honors ==
=== Trophies ===
KR

- Úrvalsdeild (1): 2008–09
- Icelandic Company Cup (1): 2008

Donar

- Dutch Basketball League (5): 2009–10, 2013–14, 2015–16, 2016–17, 2017–18
- NBB Cup (4): 2010–11, 2013–14, 2016–17, 2017–18
- Dutch Basketball Supercup (2): 2015, 2018

=== Awards ===
Donar

- DBL Most Valuable Player (1): 2010–11
- All-DBL Team (1): 2010–11
- DBL Best Defender of the Year (2): 2012–13, 2013–14
- DBL All-Star (4): 2011, 2012, 2013, 2014
- DBL All-Defense Team (2): 2014, 2017
- Icelandic All-Star Game MVP: 2009
- Icelandic All-Star: 2009
