= Holland Nordic Basketball Tournament =

- Region: Europe
- Number of teams: 8
- Current champions: (Germany) EWE Baskets Juniors (29th edition)
- President: Bart Prak

The Holland Nordic Basketball Tournament is a regional youth tournament hosted in Groningen, Netherlands, around Easter.

== History ==
The tournament was established in 1995 as a preparation for clubs in the region for a tournament in Mexico. After tremendous interest in the tournament, the organization decided to make it into a yearly tournament.

Before the 26th edition of the tournament, the organization was struggling financially because the municipality stopped subsidising the tournament. They had to start a crowdfunding to come up with the last €15.000 required to organize the tournament. The crowdfunding was a success and the tournament could be organized like previous years.

== Format ==
The tournament features teams from 7 different European countries, divided into two groups of 4. Within these groups, each team plays each other once. Then based on the group phase, two brackets are created where the respective number one play against the number two of the other group in the top 4 bracket. The winners of these matches will advance to the finals. In the bottom 4 bracket, the number 3 will play against the respective number 4 of the other group. The winners of these matches will advance to the match determining the fifth placed team of the tournament. Both brackets also play a respective losers final to determine the 3rd and 7th place.

== Champions ==
A list of champions in the oldest category.

| Edition | Year | Champions | References |
|---|---|---|---|
| 10th | 2005 | (Serbia) Zdravlje | |
| 11th | 2006 | (Latvia) BK Reinis | |
| 12th | 2007 | (Latvia) SCO Reinis | |
| 13th | 2008 | | |
| 14th | 2009 | (Russia) Gloria Basketball School | |
| 15th | 2010 | | |
| 16th | 2011 | | |
| 17th | 2012 | (United Kingdom) UK national team U18 | |
| 18th | 2013 | (Lithuania) BC Sabonis U20 | |
| 19th | 2014 | (Czech Republic) CEZ Nymburk U20 | |
| 20th | 2015 | (Russia) CSKA Moscow U20 | |
| 21st | 2016 | (United Kingdom) Itchen U19 | |
| 22nd | 2017 | (Czech Republic) BCM Orli U19 | |
| 23rd | 2018 | (Czech Republic) BCM Orli U19 | |
| 24th | 2019 | (Netherlands) Donar U19 | |
| 25th | 2022 | (Belgium) Filou Oostende U20 | |
| 26th | 2023 | (Netherlands) Dutch national Team U20 | |
| 27th | 2024 | (Lithuania) BS Tornado U19 | |
| 28th | 2025 | (Germany) Bayer Giants Leverkusen U19 | |
| 29th | 2026 | (Germany) EWE Baskets Juniors | |
