= Andrej Štimac =

Croatian basketball player and coach (born 1979)

Cibona
- Title: Assistant coach
- League: Croatian League; ABA League; FIBA Champions League

Personal information
- Born: 31 March 1979 (age 47) Rijeka, SR Croatia, SFR Yugoslavia
- Listed height: 2.05 m (6 ft 9 in)

Career information
- Playing career: 2001–2017
- Position: Power forward / center
- Coaching career: 2017–present

Career history

Playing
- 2001–2002: Kvarner
- 2002–2005: Cibona
- 2005–2006: Menorca Bàsquet
- 2006–2007: Turów Zgorzelec
- 2007–2008: Zadar
- 2008–2010: Zagreb CO
- 2010–2011: Mersin BB
- 2011–2012: Đuro Đaković
- 2012–2015: Lions de Genève
- 2015–2016: Lugano Tigers
- 2016–2017: Kvarner

Coaching
- 2017–2020: Fribourg Olympic (assistant)
- 2020–2022: Lions de Genève
- 2022: Donar (assistant)
- 2022–2024: Donar
- 2026–present: Cibona (assistant)
- 2026: Cibona (interim)

Career highlights
- As player: 2× HT Premijer liga champion (2004, 2008); Krešimir Ćosić Cup winner (2010); 2× SBL champion (2013, 2015); Swiss Cup winner (2014); 2× SBL Cup winner (2013, 2015); As assistant coach: 2× SBL champion (2018, 2019); 2× Swiss Cup winner (2018, 2019); SBL Cup winner (2018); As head coach: Swiss Cup winner (2021); SBL Cup winner (2021)

Andrej Štimac (born 31 March 1979) is a Croatian professional basketball coach and former player. He currently serves as an assistant coach for Cibona of the Croatian League, the ABA League and the FIBA Champions League.

During his playing career, he played as power forward and center.

== Playing career ==
Štimac started his professional career with KK Kvarner of the Croatian HT Premijer liga in 2001. Next, he spent three seasons with Cibona, also playing a total of 44 games in the EuroLeague where he averaged 4.7 points and 2.3 rebounds per game. In 2005, he played for Menorca Bàsquet in Spain.

From 2012 to 2016, he played in Switzerland for Lions de Genève (2012–2015) and Lugano Tigers (2015–2016). Štimac finished his career with a last season at his first club, Kvarner 2010.

== Coaching career ==
Štimac began his coaching career in 2017, as an assistant coach for Fribourg Olympic in Switzerland, serving under Petar Aleksić. He left Fribourg in 2020, and became the head coach of Lions de Genève and helped them win the Swiss Cup and SBL Cup in 2021. His contract was not renewed after the 2021–22 season when the Lions were eliminated in the semi-finals by Fribourg.

In the summer of 2022, Štimac signed a one-year contract to become assistant coach for the Dutch club Donar of the BNXT League, where he was an assistant under Matthew Otten. After Otten was fired after a disappointing start of the season, Štimac signed a contract as head coach until the 2023–24 season, on 31 October.

Štimac and Donar reached the finals of the Dutch playoffs, following a win in the semi-finals over Heroes Den Bosch. In the finals, Donar lost 2–3 to ZZ Leiden, following a Game 5 loss in Leiden.

On 3 December 2024, Štimac was sacked by Donar, following a disappointing start of the season in which the club was ranked 17th in the BNXT League.

Ahead of the 2026–27 season, Štimac joined the Croatian club Cibona as an assistant coach under Ivan Rudež. On 22 October 2026, following Rudež’s dismissal, Štimac and fellow assistant coach Neven Nikolić were appointed interim co-head coaches. Three days later, Štimac led the club to its first ABA League win of the season, defeating the Slovenian club Krka 99–84. On 28 October, he returned to the post of assistant coach under newly appointed head coach Ivan Tomas.
