= 26th Holland Nordic Basketball Tournament =

Third season of the European North Basketball League

Holland Nordic Basketball Tournament
- Season: 2023
- Duration: 27 May 2023 – 29 May 2023
- Games played: 20
- Teams: 8

Finals
- Champions: (Netherlands) Dutch national Team U20
- Runners-up: (Belgium) COREtec Basketball Academy
- Third place: (Serbia) BC Actavis U21

The 26th Holland Nordic Basketball Tournament is the twenty-sixth edition of the Holland Nordic Basketball Tournament, a regional basketball tournament organized in Groningen, Netherlands. The tournament was won by the Dutch national Team U20, after defeating the COREtec Basketball Academy in the finals with 86–79.

== Format ==
The tournament often features teams from different European countries, divided into two groups of 4. After a round-robin in their group, a final four is played with the two highest seeds of both groups.

== Teams ==
26th Holland Nordic Basketball Tournament
(Belgium) HUBO Limburg United U21	(Germany) Hamburg Towers U21	(Germany) EWE Baskets Juniors	(Netherlands) Dutch national Team U20
(Belgium) COREtec Basketball Academy	(Germany) Bayer Giants Leverkusen U21	(Serbia) BC Actavis U21	(Netherlands) Donar DTL

== Groups ==
=== Poule A ===
Pos	Team	Pld	W	L	PF	PA	PD	Pts	OOS	NED	DON	OLD
1	(Belgium) COREtec Basketball Academy	3	3	0	180	121	+59	6	—	54–43	—	68–37
2	(Netherlands) Dutch national Team U20	3	2	1	143	145	−2	5	—	—	49–46	—
3	(Netherlands) Donar DTL	3	1	2	155	154	+1	4	41–58	—	—	—
4	(Germany) EWE Baskets Juniors	3	0	3	129	187	−58	3	—	45–51	47–68	—

=== Poule B ===
Pos	Team	Pld	W	L	PF	PA	PD	Pts	ACT	LIM	HAM	(Germany) LEV
1	(Serbia) BC Actavis U21	3	3	0	219	180	+39	6	—	76–63	—	—
2	(Belgium) HUBO Limburg United U21	3	2	1	192	169	+23	5	—	—	60–47	69–47
3	(Germany) Hamburg Towers U20	3	1	2	170	182	−12	4	60–70	—	—	63–52
4	(Germany) Bayer Giants Leverkusen U21	3	0	3	156	206	−50	3	57–73	—	—	—

== Playoffs ==
Bottom 4 bracket

Crossplay
28 May
(Germany) EWE Baskets Juniors	52
(Germany) Hamburg Towers U21	61
28 May
(Germany) Bayer Giants Leverkusen U21	42
(Netherlands) Donar DTL	66

5th place game
29 May
(Germany) Hamburg Towers U21	90
(Netherlands) Donar DTL	94
7th place game
29 May
(Germany) EWE Baskets Juniors	92
(Germany) Bayer Giants Leverkusen U21	60

Top 4 bracket

Semifinals
28 May
(Netherlands) Dutch national Team U20	79
(Serbia) BC Actavis U21	74
28 May
(Belgium) HUBO Limburg United U21	52
(Belgium) COREtec Basketball Academy	53

Championship game
29 May
(Netherlands) Dutch national Team U20	86
(Belgium) COREtec Basketball Academy	79
Third place game
29 May
(Serbia) BC Actavis U21	68
(Belgium) HUBO Limburg United U21	52
