= 25th Holland Nordic Basketball Tournament =

Third season of the European North Basketball League

Holland Nordic Basketball Tournament
- Season: 2022
- Duration: 4 June 2022 – 6 June 2022
- Games played: 20
- Teams: 8

Finals
- Champions: (Belgium) BC Oostende U20
- Runners-up: (Germany) EWE Baskets Juniors
- Third place: (Netherlands) Donar U20

The 25th Holland Nordic Basketball Tournament is the twenty-fifth edition of the Holland Nordic Basketball Tournament, a regional basketball tournament organized in Groningen, Netherlands. The tournament was won by BC Oostende U20, after defeating the EWE Baskets Juniors in the finals with 91–65.

== Format ==
The tournament often features teams from different European countries, divided into two groups of 4. After a round-robin in their group, a final four is played with the two highest seeds of both groups.

== Teams ==
25th Holland Nordic Basketball Tournament
(Italy) Fortitudo U20	(Belgium) BC Oostende U20	(Serbia) BC Actavis U20	(Germany) EWE Baskets Juniors
(Germany) Hamburg Towers U20	(Poland) UKS Katowice U20	(Lithuania) BS Tornado U20	(Netherlands) Donar U20

== Groups ==
=== Poule A ===
Pos	Team	Pld	W	L	PF	PA	PD	Pts	OLD	TOR	ACT	KAT
1	(Germany) EWE Baskets Juniors	3	3	0	185	154	+31	6	—	53–49	60–58	—
2	(Lithuania) BS Tornado U20	3	2	1	196	176	+20	5	—	—	80–64	—
3	(Serbia) BC Actavis U20	3	1	2	190	200	−10	4	—	—	—	68–60
4	(Poland) UKS Katowice U20	3	0	3	166	207	−41	3	47–72	59–67	—	—

=== Poule B ===
Pos	Team	Pld	W	L	PF	PA	PD	Pts	OOS	DON	HAM	FOR
1	(Belgium) BC Oostende U20	3	3	0	233	144	+89	6	—	—	74–45	—
2	(Netherlands) Donar U20	3	2	1	164	187	−23	5	44–75	—	55–53	—
3	(Germany) Hamburg Towers U20	3	1	2	153	183	−30	4	—	—	—	55–54
4	(Italy) Fortitudo U20	3	0	3	168	204	−36	3	55–84	59–65	—	—

== Playoffs ==
Bottom 4 bracket

Crossplay
5 June
(Poland) UKS Katowice U20	52
(Germany) Hamburg Towers U20	62
5 June
(Italy) Fortitudo U20	74
(Serbia) BC Actavis U20	49

5th place game
6 June
(Germany) Hamburg Towers U20	86
(Italy) Fortitudo U20	90
7th place game
6 June
(Poland) UKS Katowice U20	78
(Serbia) BC Actavis U20	82

Top 4 bracket

Semifinals
5 June
(Lithuania) BS Tornado U20	42
(Belgium) BC Oostende U20	91
5 June
(Netherlands) Donar U20	55
(Germany) EWE Baskets Juniors	63

Championship game
6 June
(Belgium) BC Oostende U20	91
(Germany) EWE Baskets Juniors	65
Third place game
6 June
(Lithuania) BS Tornado U20	58
(Netherlands) Donar U20	73
