= Martin de Vries =

Martin de Vries may refer to

- Maarten Gerritszoon Vries (1589–1647), explorer and cartographer for the Dutch East India Company
- Martin de Vries (basketball) (born 1960), Dutch basketball player
- Martijn de Vries (born 1992), Dutch footballer
