= 27th Holland Nordic Basketball Tournament =

Third season of the European North Basketball League

Holland Nordic Basketball Tournament
- Season: 2024
- Duration: 30 March 2024 – 1 April 2024
- Games played: 20
- Teams: 8

Finals
- Champions: (Lithuania) BS Tornado U19
- Runners-up: (Belgium) COREtec Basketball Academy
- Third place: (Germany) Bayer Giants Leverkusen U19

The 27th Holland Nordic Basketball Tournament was the twenty-seventh edition of the Holland Nordic Basketball Tournament, a regional basketball tournament organized in Groningen, Netherlands. The tournament was won by BS Tornado, after defeating the COREtec Basketball Academy in the finals with 88–81.

== Format ==
The tournament often features teams from different European countries, divided into two groups of 4. After a round-robin in their group, a final four is played with the two highest seeds of both groups.

== Teams ==
27th Holland Nordic Basketball Tournament
(Belgium) Falco Ghent	(Belgium) COREtec Basketball Academy	(Germany) Bayer Giants Leverkusen U19	(Germany) EWE Baskets Juniors
(Germany) Hamburg Towers U19	(United Kingdom) Myerscough Basketball U19	(Lithuania) BS Tornado U19	(Netherlands) Donar U19

== Groups ==
=== Poule A ===
Pos	Team	Pld	W	L	PF	PA	PD	Pts	OOS	OLD	DON	MYE
1	(Belgium) COREtec Basketball Academy	3	3	0	193	152	+41	6	—	—	66–50	68–50
2	(Germany) EWE Baskets Juniors	3	2	1	175	150	+25	5	52–59	—	53–45	—
3	(Netherlands) Donar U19	3	1	2	157	160	−3	4	—	—	—	62–41
4	(United Kingdom) Myerscough Basketball U19	3	0	3	137	200	−63	3	—	46–70	—	—

=== Poule B ===
Pos	Team	Pld	W	L	PF	PA	PD	Pts	TOR	LEV	FAL	HAM
1	(Lithuania) BS Tornado U19	3	3	0	226	147	+79	6	—	—	63–56	—
2	(Germany) Bayer Giants Leverkusen U19	3	2	1	194	190	+4	5	52–94	—	—	—
3	(Belgium) Falco Ghent U19	3	1	2	156	178	−22	4	—	43–61	—	57–54
4	(Germany) Hamburg Towers U19	3	0	3	146	207	−61	3	39–69	53–81	—	—

== Playoffs ==
Bottom 4 bracket

Crossplay
5 April
(Germany) Hamburg Towers U19	44
(Netherlands) Donar U19	70
5 April
(United Kingdom) Myerscough Basketball U19	44
(Belgium) Falco Ghent U19	75

5th place game
6 April
(Netherlands) Donar U19	66
(Belgium) Falco Ghent U19	95
7th place game
6 April
(Germany) Hamburg Towers U19	59
(United Kingdom) Myerscough Basketball U19	72

Top 4 bracket

Semifinals
5 April
(Germany) EWE Baskets Juniors	42
(Lithuania) BS Tornado U19	91
5 April
(Germany) Bayer Giants Leverkusen U19	48
(Belgium) COREtec Basketball Academy	68

Championship game
6 April
(Lithuania) BS Tornado U19	88
(Belgium) COREtec Basketball Academy	81
Third place game
6 April
(Germany) EWE Baskets Juniors	72
(Germany) Bayer Giants Leverkusen U19	77
