= Ivan Rudež =

Croatian basketball coach (born 1979)

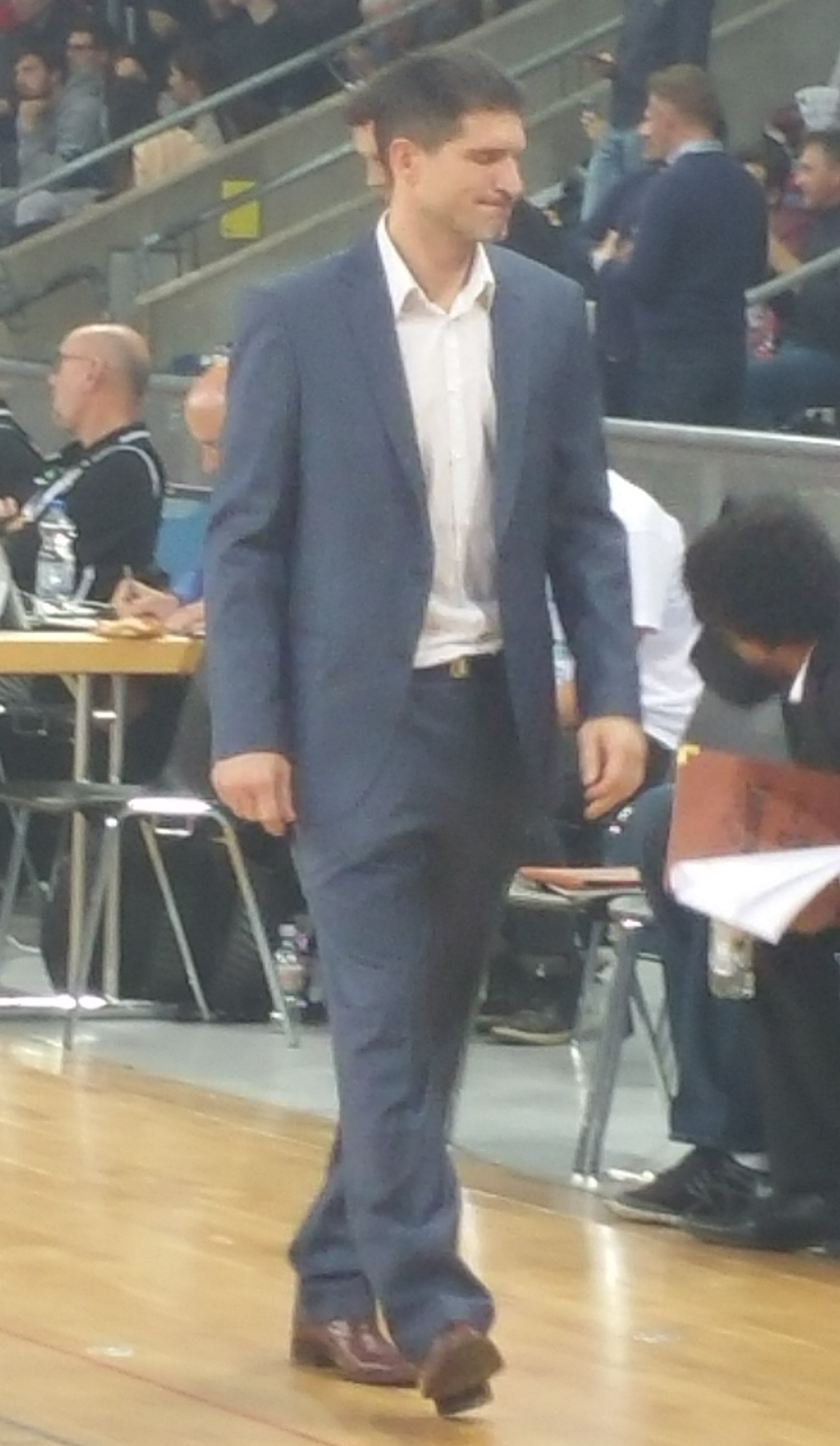
- Rudež in November 2018

Personal information
- Born: 22 December 1979 (age 46) Zagreb, SR Croatia, SFR Yugoslavia
- Position: Head coach
- Coaching career: 2006–present

Career history

Coaching
- 2006–2007: Zrinjevac
- 2007–2010: Prievidza
- 2010–2011: Cedevita (assistant)
- 2011: BC Vienna
- 2011–2012: Cibona (assistant)
- 2012–2016: Lions de Genève
- 2016–2018: Slovakia
- 2018–2020: PS Karlsruhe Lions
- 2020–2021: Donar
- 2022–2023: Kaposvári KK
- 2025–2026: Cibona

Career highlights
- 2× Swiss League champion (2013, 2015); Croatian League champion (2026); Swiss Cup winner (2014); 2× Swiss League Cup winner (2013, 2015)

Ivan Rudež (born 22 December 1979) is a Croatian professional basketball coach who was most recently the head coach for Cibona of the Croatian League, the ABA League and the FIBA Champions League.

== Coaching career ==
Rudež started as a coach at KK Zrinjevac in 2004, where he coached both U18 and senior teams. In 2007, he went to Slovakia, where he coached BC Prievidza until 2010. After that, Rudež was named an assistant coach of the Croatian club Cedevita.

In the summer of 2011, Rudež took over BC Vienna of the Austrian Bundesliga as the head coach. After compiling a record of three wins and six losses in the Austrian top flight he parted ways with the club in November 2011 and then moved to Cibona, where he served as assistant coach to Jasmin Repeša.

In 2012, Rudež signed as the head coach with the Swiss side Lions de Genève, where he worked until 2016. He was awarded Coach of the Year twice, and won two national championships and three national cup titles.

Between 2016 and 2018, Rudež led the Slovakia men's national team.

In November 2018, Rudež accepted the position as the head coach of the PS Karlsruhe Lions in the German second-tier ProA league. He guided the team to the playoffs in 2018–19, where they lost to top-seeded Chemnitz in the quarter-finals. He was sacked in early February 2020. At that time, the Karlsruhe team was 15th of 17 teams in the ProA league, having won seven of 22 games that season.

On 17 April 2020, Rudež signed a three-year deal with Donar in the Netherlands. On 13 April 2021, he was fired by the club following a 70-96 loss to ZZ Leiden. At that time, the team ranked third in the Dutch Basketball League standings, but had won only three of the previous eight league games.

In June 2022, he was appointed as head coach of Kaposvári KK of the Hungarian league (Nemzeti Bajnokság I/A). In May 2023, Rudež was named director of the national performance centre (Centre National du Basketball Suisse) of the Swiss Basketball Federation.

In July 2023, he coached the Swiss U18 men's national team at the FIBA European Championship (Division B), finishing 18th out of 22 teams. Rudež was the head coach of the Swiss squad at the 2025 FIBA Under-19 Basketball World Cup in Lausanne. At this event, he guided Switzerland to the quarterfinals, which was considered as one of the greatest achievements in Swiss basketball history.

Rudež departed the Swiss basketball federation in late July 2025, to take over the helm of KK Cibona Zagreb. Under his guidance, Cibona won the 2026 Croatian championship. His tenure at Cibona ended on October 22, 2026.

== Personal life ==
His younger brother, Damjan, is a professional basketball player who has played with the Indiana Pacers, Minnesota Timberwolves and Orlando Magic in the National Basketball Association (NBA).
