= DBL Defensive Player of the Year =

The Dutch Basketball League Best Defender of the Year is an award that is yearly given to the best defensive player in the DBL, the highest professional basketball league in the Netherlands. The award is handed out after the regular season since 2013. The award is handed out by the FEB (Federatie Eredivisie Basketbal).

== Winners ==
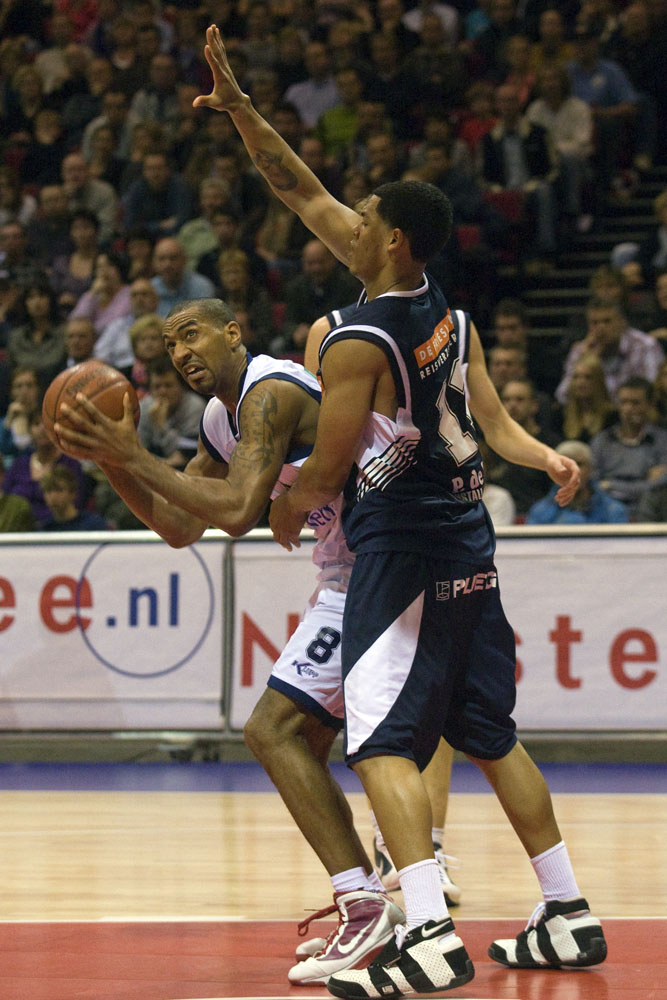
Jason Dourisseau won the inaugural award and his second the following year.

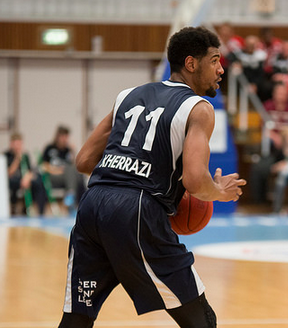
Mohamed Kherrazi won the award in two consecutive seasons.

Key
Player (X)	Name of the player and number of times they had won the award at that point (if more than one)
Nationality	Nationality as registered by FIBA, player may hold more nationalities
†	Indicates multiple award winners in the same season
‡	Denotes the club were DBL champions in the same season

DBL Defensive Players of the Year
Season	Player	Position	Nationality	Team	Ref.
2012–13	Jason Dourisseau	Forward	United States	GasTerra Flames	
2013–14	Jason Dourisseau (2)	Forward	United States	GasTerra Flames^{‡}	
2014–15	Mohamed Kherrazi	Forward	Netherlands	ZZ Leiden	
2015–16	Mohamed Kherrazi (2)	Forward	Netherlands	ZZ Leiden	
2016–17	J.T. Tiller	Guard	United States	Landstede	
2017–18	Sean Cunningham	Guard	Netherlands (Note: Sean Cunningham, born in Los Angeles, California, also owns the American nationality.)	Donar^{‡}	
2018–19	Mohamed Kherrazi (3)	Forward	Netherlands	ZZ Leiden	
2020–21	Worthy de Jong	Guard	Netherlands	ZZ Leiden	

== Awards won by nationality ==
Country	Total
Netherlands	5
United States	3

== Awards won by club ==
Country	Total
ZZ Leiden	4
Donar (Note: Previously also known as "GasTerra Flames".)	3
Landstede	2
