= Damjan Rudež =

Croatian basketball player (born 1986)

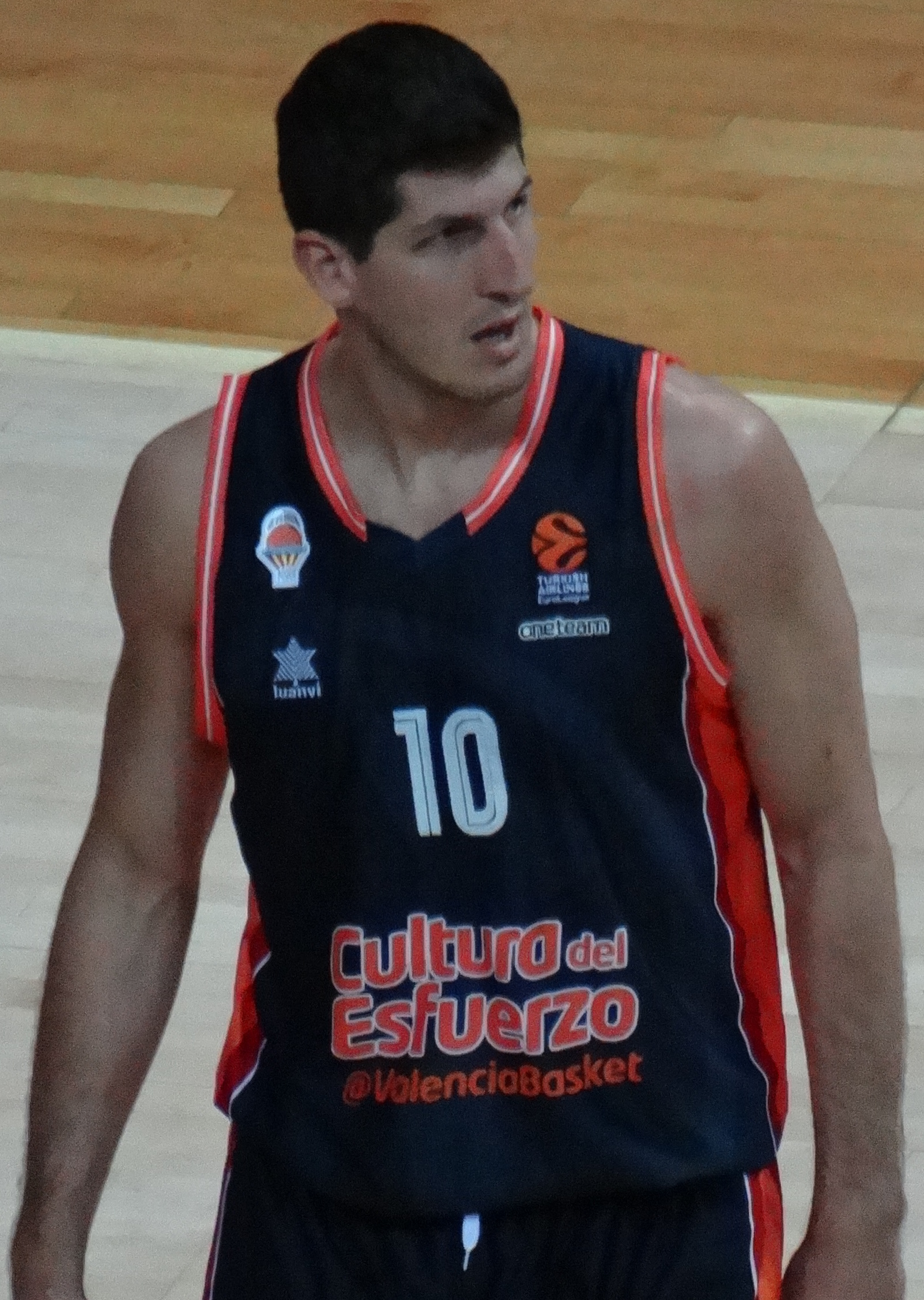
- Rudež with Valencia in 2017

Personal information
- Born: 17 June 1986 (age 40) Zagreb, SR Croatia, Yugoslavia
- Listed height: 6 ft 10 in (2.08 m)
- Listed weight: 228 lb (103 kg)

Career information
- NBA draft: 2008: undrafted
- Playing career: 2002–2021
- Position: Small forward / power forward
- Number: 9, 10, 3

Career history
- 2002–2004: Zrinjevac
- 2004–2006: Oostende
- 2006–2008: Split
- 2008–2009: Union Olimpija
- 2009–2011: Cedevita
- 2011–2012: Cibona
- 2012–2014: Zaragoza
- 2014–2015: Indiana Pacers
- 2015–2016: Minnesota Timberwolves
- 2016–2017: Orlando Magic
- 2017–2018: Valencia
- 2018: Monaco
- 2018–2019: Murcia
- 2020–2021: Donar

Career highlights
- Belgian League champion (2006); Croatian League champion (2012); Slovenian League champion (2009); Slovenian Cup winner (2009); 3× Croatian League All-Star (2007, 2008, 2010)
- Stats at NBA.com
- Stats at Basketball Reference
Medals
Men's basketball
Representing Croatia
Mediterranean Games
| Gold medal – first place | 2009 Pescara |

Damjan Rudež (born 17 June 1986) is a Croatian former professional basketball player. He represented the Croatian national team. Standing at 6 ft 10 in (2.08 m), he played at both forward positions.

== Professional career ==
=== Europe ===
From 2002 to 2004, Rudež played for the junior team of Zrinjevac and occasionally for the senior team. From 2004 to 2006, he played for the Belgian club Oostende, where he won his first championship in 2006. From 2006 to 2008, he played for Split.

In June 2008, he signed a two-year deal with Union Olimpija. In 2009, he left Olimpija and signed with Cedevita Zagreb.

On 7 July 2011, he signed a one-year deal with Cibona Zagreb.

In August 2012, he signed a one-year deal with CAI Zaragoza of Spain. On 26 June 2013, he re-signed with Zaragoza on a two-year deal. In June 2014, he requested a buy-out from his contract with Zaragoza.

=== NBA ===
On 11 July 2014, Rudež signed a three-year deal with the Indiana Pacers. During 2014–15 NBA season, Rudež led all rookies in three-point field goal percentage.

On 12 July 2015, Rudež was traded to the Minnesota Timberwolves in exchange for Chase Budinger. On 27 June 2016, the Timberwolves declined the $1.2 million team option on Rudež's contract for the 2016–17 season, making him an unrestricted free agent.

On 8 September 2016, Rudež signed with the Orlando Magic. On 7 September 2017, he re-signed with the Magic. On 13 October 2017, he was waived by the Magic.

=== Return to Europe ===
On 26 October 2017, Rudež signed a three-month contract with Spanish club Valencia Basket. Following the expiration of his contract, on 29 January 2018, he parted ways with Valencia. On 16 July 2018, Rudež signed a one-year contract with Spanish club UCAM Murcia. Eventough he had several offers, Rudež made the choice to stay home during the 2019–2020 season to take care of his baby. He planned to return in March, April or May, but the coronavirus made a return impossible.

On 27 June 2020, Rudež signed with Donar in the Netherlands. His brother Ivan had signed before as head coach. He averaged 7.9 points, 4 rebounds and 3 assists in the Dutch Basketball League.

In November, 2021, Rudež announced his retirement from playing basketball and his intention to remain professionally in the sport.

== NBA career statistics ==
Legend
| GP | Games played | GS | Games started | MPG | Minutes per game |
| FG% | Field goal percentage | 3P% | 3-point field goal percentage | FT% | Free throw percentage |
| RPG | Rebounds per game | APG | Assists per game | SPG | Steals per game |
| BPG | Blocks per game | PPG | Points per game | **Bold** | Career high |

=== Regular season ===
| Year | Team | GP | GS | MPG | FG% | 3P% | FT% | RPG | APG | SPG | BPG | PPG |
|---|---|---|---|---|---|---|---|---|---|---|---|---|
| 2014–15 | Indiana | **68** | **2** | **15.4** | **.452** | **.406** | .696 | **.7** | **.8** | .2 | **.1** | **4.8** |
| 2015–16 | Minnesota | 33 | 0 | 8.4 | .403 | .340 | **1.000** | .6 | .3 | .1 | .0 | 2.3 |
| 2016–17 | Orlando | 45 | 0 | 7.0 | .352 | .313 | .000 | .6 | .4 | **.3** | .0 | 1.8 |
| Career | | 146 | 2 | 11.2 | .424 | .373 | .774 | .6 | .6 | .2 | .0 | 3.3 |

== National team career ==
On 3 August 2008, he was called into the senior Croatian national basketball team to compete at the 2008 Summer Olympics, after Damir Markota withdrew from the team, due to injury.

In 2009, he won the gold medal at the XVI Mediterranean Games, which were held in Pescara, Italy. He also represented Croatia at the EuroBasket 2015, where they were eliminated in the eighth-finals by the Czech Republic.

== Honours ==
=== Club ===
Oostende

- Belgian League: 2005–06

Union Olimpija

- Slovenian Premier A: 2008–09
- Slovenian Cup: 2009

Cibona

- A-1 Liga: 2011–12

=== International ===
Croatia

- Mediterranean Games: (gold) 2009

=== Individual ===
- A-1 Liga All-Star: 2007, 2008, 2010

== Personal life ==
His older brother Ivan Rudež is a professional basketball coach for Donar in the Netherlands.
