= 29th Holland Nordic Basketball Tournament =

Third season of the European North Basketball League

Holland Nordic Basketball Tournament
- Season: 2026
- Duration: 4 April 2026 – 6 April 2026
- Games played: 20
- Teams: 8

Finals
- Champions: (Germany) EWE Baskets Juniors
- Runners-up: (Lithuania) BS Tornado U19
- Third place: (Belgium) BCC Falco Gent U19

The 29th Holland Nordic Basketball Tournament is the twenty-ninth edition of the Holland Nordic Basketball Tournament, a regional basketball tournament organized in Groningen, Netherlands.

== Format ==
The tournament features teams from 7 different European countries, divided into two groups of 4. Within these groups, each team plays each other once. Then based on the group phase, two brackets are created where the respective number one play against the number two of the other group in the top 4 bracket. The winners of these matches will advance to the finals. In the bottom 4 bracket, the number 3 will play against the respective number 4 of the other group. The winners of these matches will advance to the match determining the fifth placed team of the tournament. Both brackets also play a respective losers final to determine the 3rd and 7th place.

== Teams ==
29th Holland Nordic Basketball Tournament
(Denmark) Bakken Bears U19	(Spain) Baloncesto Alcalá U19	(Belgium) BCC Falco Gent U19	(Germany) EWE Baskets Juniors
(Germany) Bayer Giants Leverkusen U19	(France) BC Bray Dunes U19	(Lithuania) BS Tornado U19	(Netherlands) Donar U19

== Groups ==
=== Poule A ===
Pos	Team	Pld	W	L	PF	PA	PD	Pts	OLD	TOR	BAL	DON
1	(Germany) EWE Baskets Juniors	3	3	0	226	190	+36	9	—	79–72	—	64–60
2	(Lithuania) BS Tornado U19	3	2	1	210	189	+21	7	—	—	—	65–56
3	(Spain) Baloncesto Alcalá U19	3	1	2	177	203	−26	5	58–83	54–73	—	—
4	(Netherlands) Donar U19	3	0	3	163	194	−31	3	—	—	47–65	—

Source: hnbt.nl/

=== Poule B ===
Pos	Team	Pld	W	L	PF	PA	PD	Pts	BAK	FAL	LEV	DUN
1	(Denmark) Bakken Bears U19	3	2	1	233	188	+45	7	—	—	79–65	—
2	(Belgium) BCC Falco Gent U19	3	2	1	211	178	+33	7	71–70	—	—	73–35
3	(Germany) Bayer Giants Leverkusen U19	3	2	1	226	195	+31	7	—	73–67	—	—
4	(France) BC Bray Dunes U19	3	0	3	136	245	−109	3	52–84	—	49–88	—

Source: hnbt.nl/

== Playoffs ==
Bottom 4 bracket

Crossplay
5 April
(Netherlands) Donar U19	84
(Germany) Bayer Giants Leverkusen U19	74
5 April
(France) BC Bray Dunes U19	45
(Spain) Baloncesto Alcalá U19	67

5th place game
6 April
(Netherlands) Donar U19	63
(Spain) Baloncesto Alcalá U19	66
7th place game
6 April
(Germany) Bayer Giants Leverkusen U19	99
(France) BC Bray Dunes U19	42

Top 4 bracket

Semifinals
5 April
(Lithuania) BS Tornado U19	90
(Denmark) Bakken Bears U19	58
5 April
(Belgium) BCC Falco Gent U19	60
(Germany) EWE Baskets Juniors	72

Championship game
6 April
(Lithuania) BS Tornado U19	58
(Germany) EWE Baskets Juniors	70
Third place game
6 April
(Denmark) Bakken Bears U19	70
(Belgium) BCC Falco Gent U19	77
