= Korenbeurs (Groningen) =

National heritage site in Groningen, Netherlands

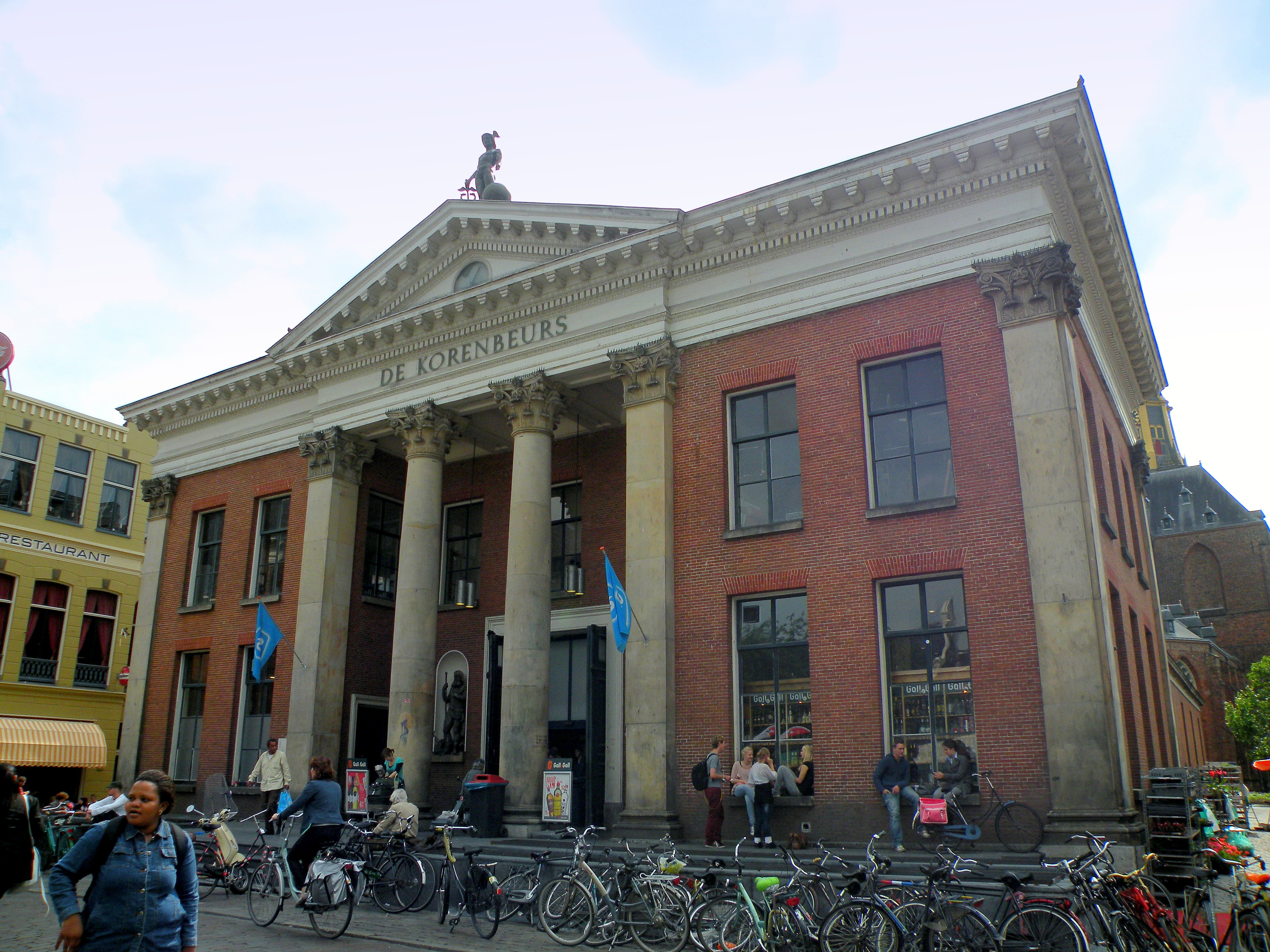
- The Korenbeurs in 2012

- Location within Groningen (province)

General information
- Architectural style: Neoclassical
- Location: Akerkhof 1 Groningen, Netherlands
- Coordinates: 53°13′0″N 6°33′48″E
- Current tenants: Albert Heijn

The Korenbeurs (Dutch pronunciation: [ˈkoːrə(m)ˌbøːrs]; English: Grain Exchange) is a neoclassical building in Groningen in the Netherlands. It was originally used as an exchange for food grain trade. Its current tenant is Albert Heijn.

The building is a rijksmonument (national heritage site) since 1971 and is one of the Top 100 Dutch heritage sites that was selected in 1990.

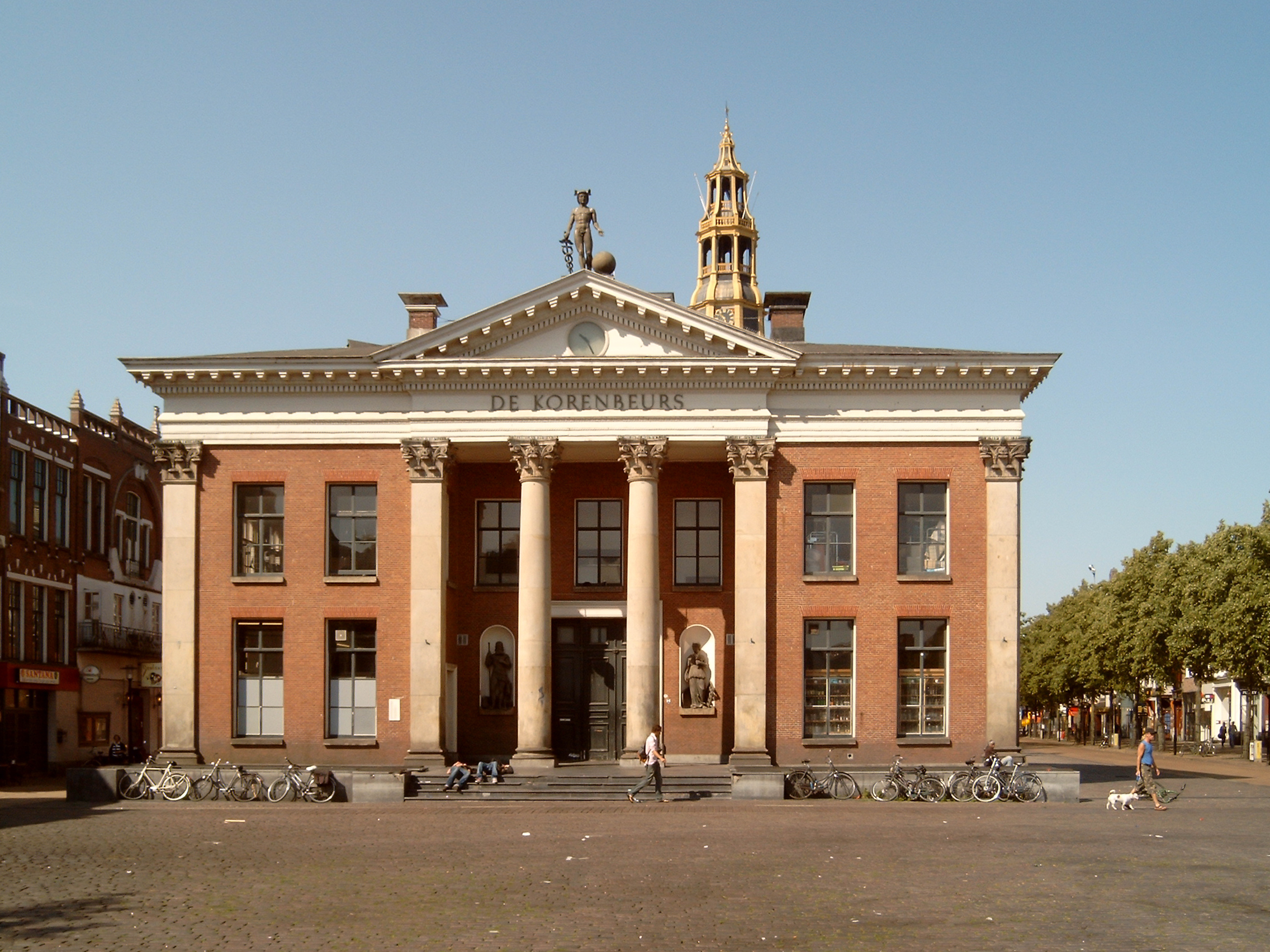
Korenbeurs in 2009, with the tower of Der Aa-kerk behind it

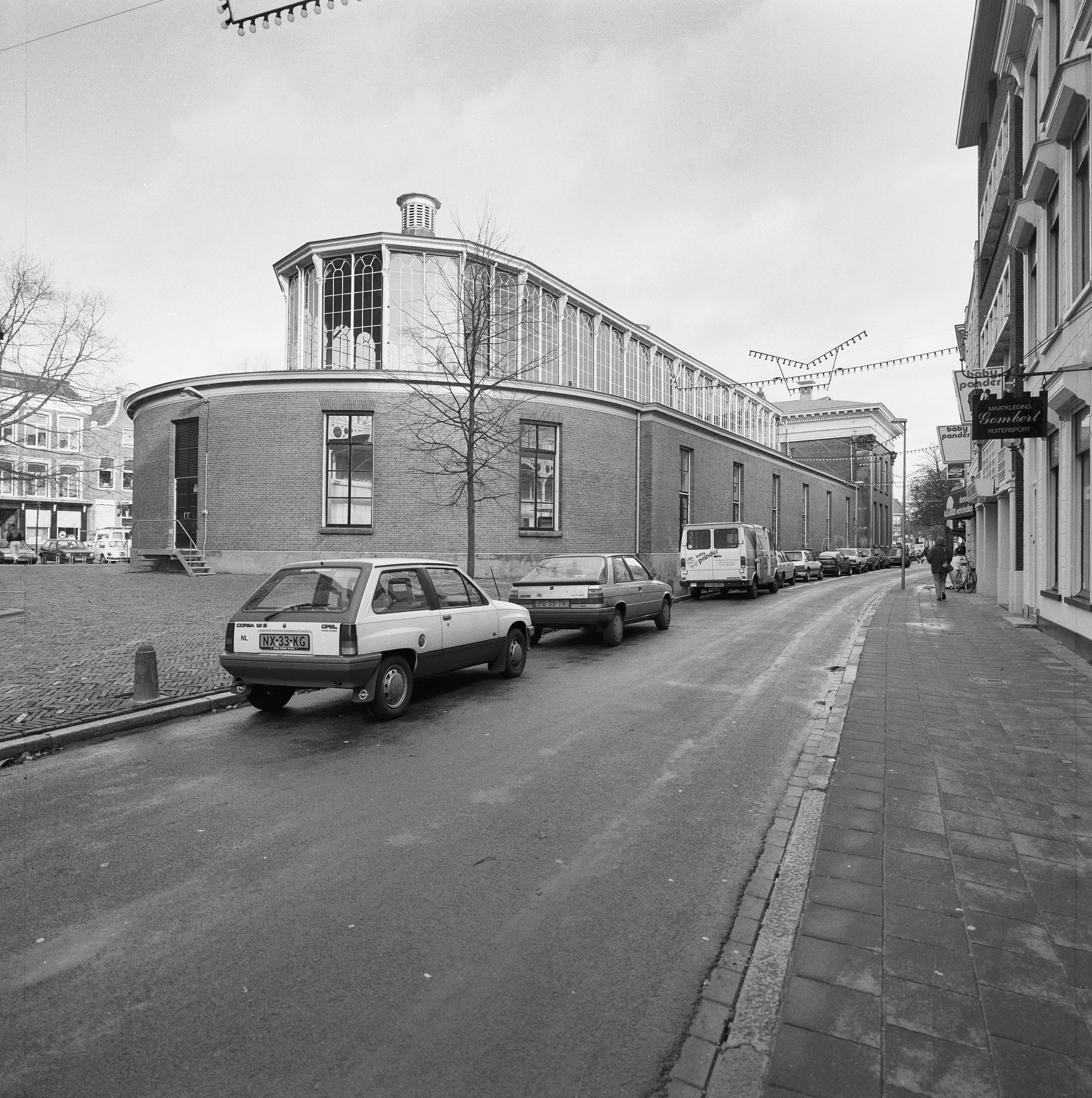
Backside of the building in 1992

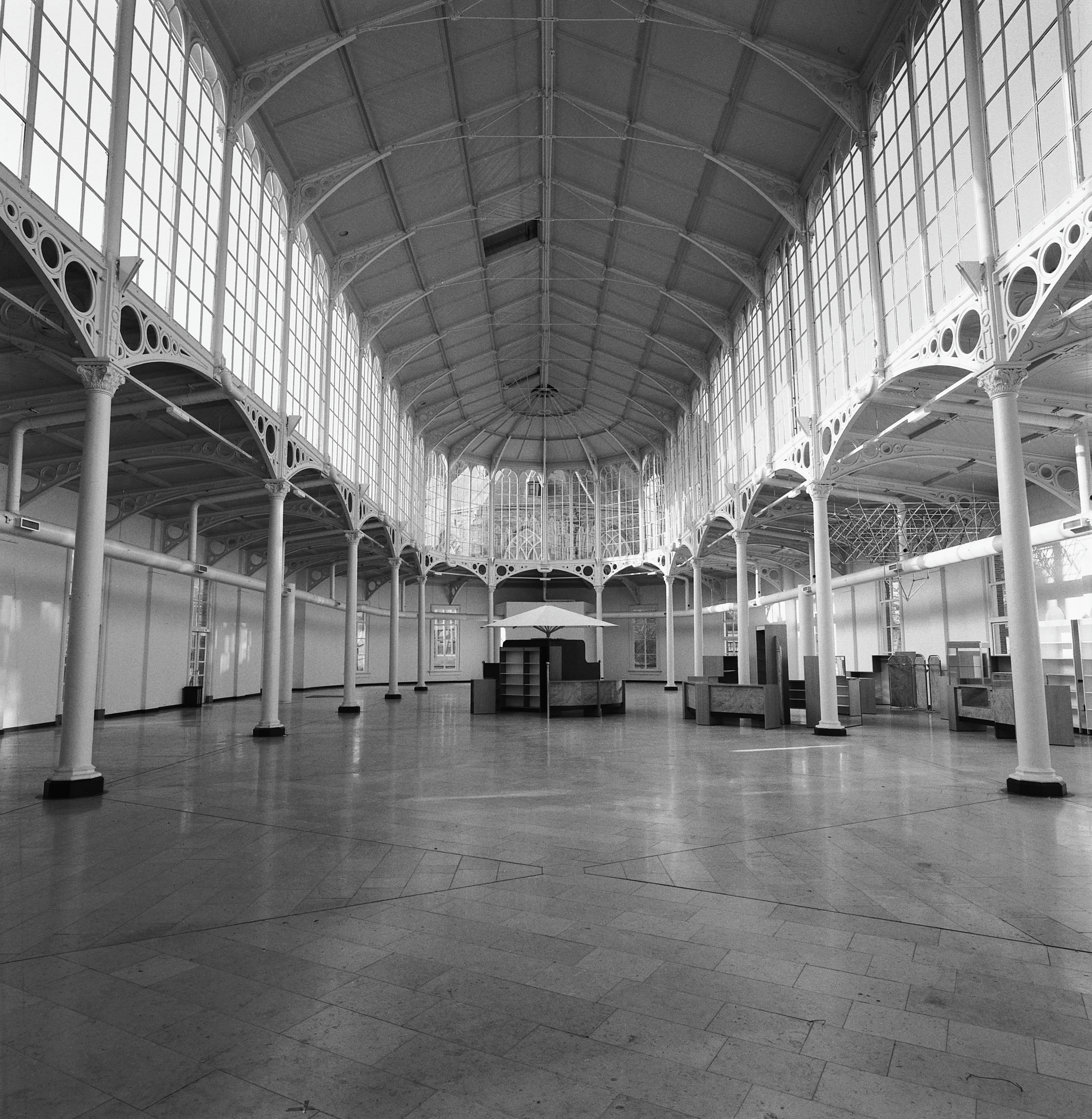
Interior in 1992

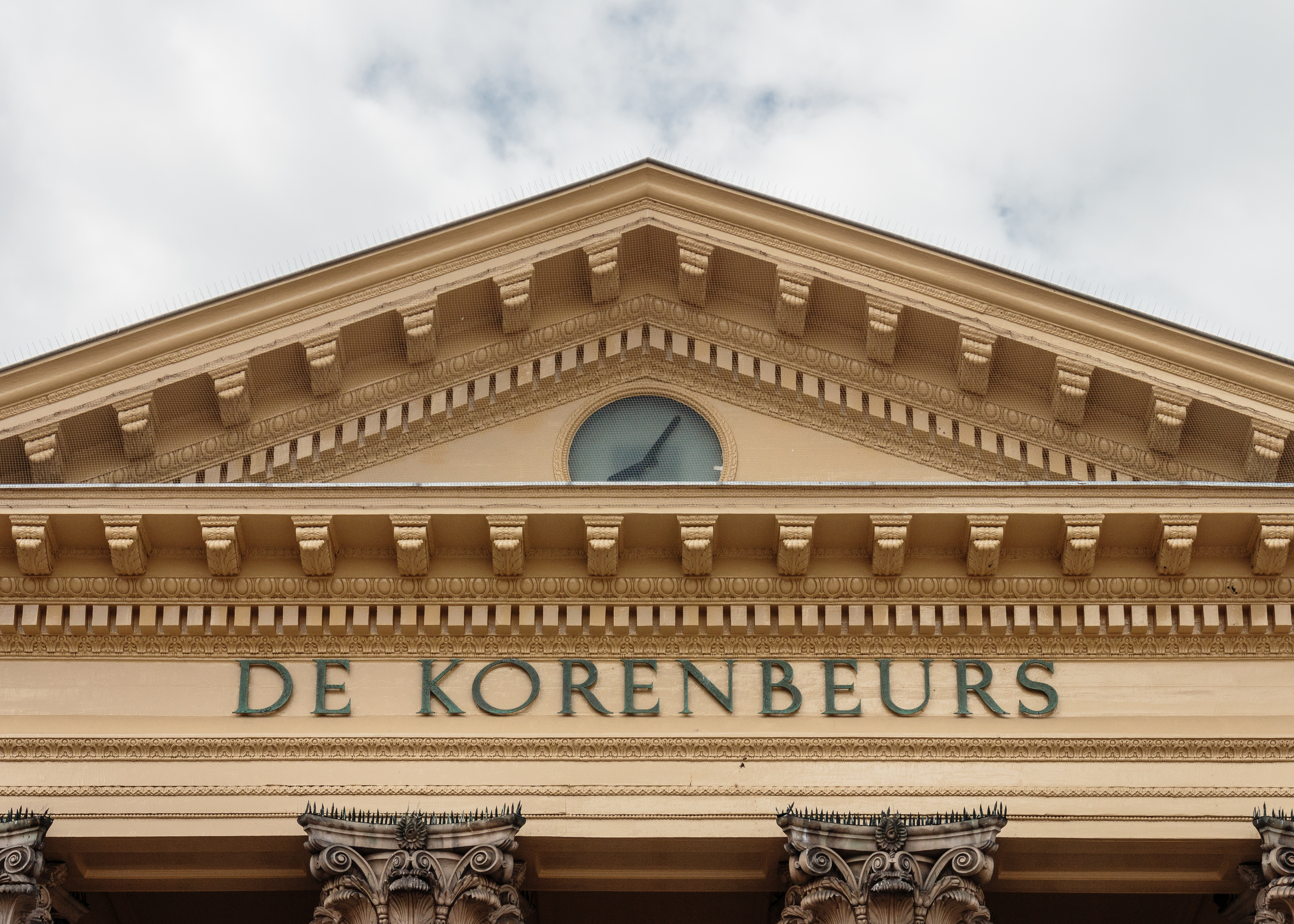
Detail frontage. (East side).
