= Martin de Vries (basketball) =

Dutch basketball player (born 1960)

Personal information
- Born: 7 April 1960 (age 66) Groningen, Netherlands
- Listed height: 6 ft 4 in (1.93 m)

Career information
- Playing career: 1979–1990
- Position: Shooting guard
- Number: 10

Career history
- 1979–1983: Donar
- 1983–1984: Orca's
- 1984–1986: Hatrans Haaksbergen
- 1986–1990: Donar

Career highlights
- Eredivisie champion (1982); 2× First-team All-Eredivisie (1987, 1989); 3× Eredivisie All-Star (1987, 1989, 1990); No. 10 retired by Donar

Martin de Vries (born 7 April 1960) is a Dutch former professional basketball player. After playing eight seasons for Donar, his jersey number 10 was retired by the club.

De Vries started playing for Donar in 1979, at age 19. From 1983 to 1986, he played for BV Orca's and Hatrans Haaksbergen.

He also played 27 games for the Netherlands men's national basketball team.

From 2013 to 2022, De Vries was the technical director of Donar.

== Career statistics ==
=== Eredivisie ===
Legend
GP	Games played	GS	Games started	MPG	Minutes per game
FG%	Field goal percentage	3P%	3-point field goal percentage	FT%	Free throw percentage
RPG	Rebounds per game	APG	Assists per game	SPG	Steals per game
BPG	Blocks per game	PPG	Points per game	**Bold**	Career high

Source: Basketball Nederland.

Year	Team	GP	GS	MPG	FG%	3P%	FT%	RPG	APG	SPG	BPG	PPG
Career		286		10.4	.492	.498	.779	1.6	1.3	0.7	0.1	15.5
