= SBL Cup =

Swiss basketball league cup

- Founded: 2004; 22 years ago
- No. of teams: 6
- Country: Switzerland
- Confederation: FIBA Europe
- Most recent champion: Fribourg Olympic (5th title)
- Related competitions: Swiss Basketball League; Swiss Basketball Cup
- Website: swissbasketball.ch/sbl-cup/

The SBL Cup is the national professional league cup competition that is organised by the Swiss Basketball League (SBL), which is the top-tier level basketball division in Switzerland. The competition was introduced in 2004, and is the second cup competition that SBL teams play in, along with the Federation Swiss Cup. Formerly, the competition was known as the Swiss Basketball League Cup.

== Format ==
Six teams from a given SBL regular season qualify, with the two highest seeds having a bye in the quarter-finals. A final four tournament, at a host city, is played to determine the winner of the SBL Cup.

== Finals ==
=== Key ===
†	Result after overtime

==== 2018–present ====
Year	Host city	Winners	Runners-up	Score	MVP
2022		Fribourg Olympic	SAM Massagno	84–73	(France) Natan Jurkovitz
2021	Montreux	Lions de Genève	SAM Massagno	78–60	(Croatia) Ive Ivanov
2020	Montreux	Fribourg Olympic	Union Neuchatêl	63–54	(United States) Xavier Pollard
2019		Lions de Genève	SAM Massagno	67–53	(United States) Terry Smith
2018	Clarens	Fribourg Olympic	Lugano Tigers	93–86 †	(Senegal) Babacar Touré

==== 2004–2017 ====
Year	Champions
2017	Monthey
2016	Monthey
2015	Lions de Genève
2014	Union Neuchâtel
2013	Lions de Genève
2012	Lugano Tigers
2011	Lugano Tigers
2010	Benetton Fribourg Olympic
2009	Benetton Fribourg Olympic
2008	Benetton Fribourg Olympic
2007	Benetton Fribourg Olympic
2006	Boncourt
2005	Boncourt
2004	Geneva Devils

== See also ==
- Swiss Basketball League (SBL)
- Swiss Basketball Cup (Federation Cup)
