= Donar (basketball) =

Coordinates: 53°12′10″N 6°33′23″E

Donar Groningen
- Leagues: BNXT League; ENBL
- Founded: 20 January 1951; 75 years ago
- History: List: GSSV Donar 1951–2003 Capitals Groningen 2003–2009 GasTerra Flames 2009–2014 Donar 2014–present
- Stadium: MartiniPlaza
- Capacity: 4,350
- Location: Groningen, Netherlands
- Team colors: White, Blue, Navy
- Main sponsor: FlexVirtual
- Chairman: Stefan Mladenovic
- Head coach: Jason Dourisseau
- Team captain: Kjeld Zuidema
- Affiliation: Donar U19
- Championships: 7 Dutch Championships; 8 Dutch Cups; 3 Dutch Supercups
- Retired numbers: 3 (8, 10, 14)
- Website: www.donar.nl
Home	Away

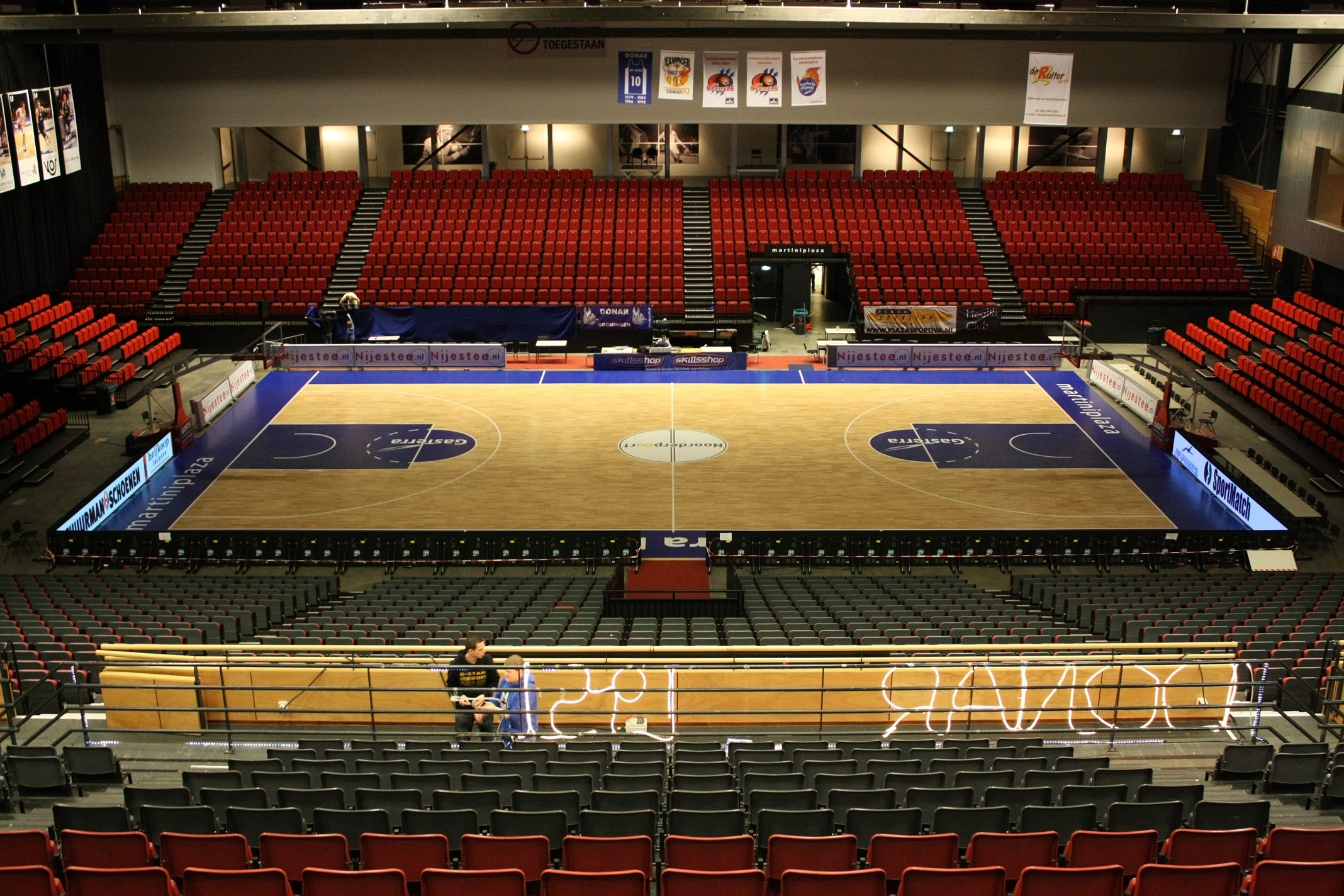
MartiniPlaza, home arena of Donar

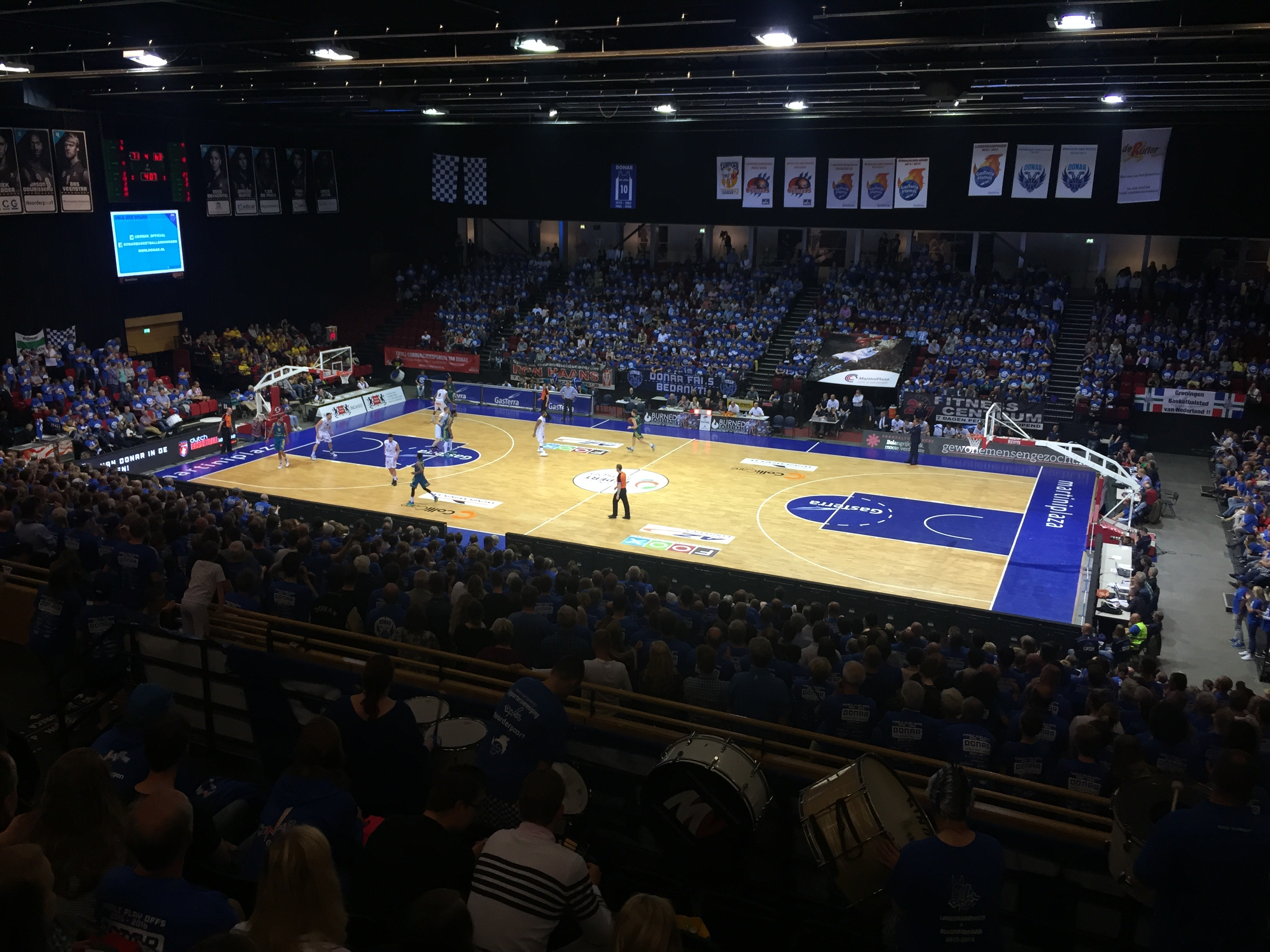
Home game of Donar in 2016

Donar, also known as Donar Groningen, is a professional basketball club based in Groningen, Netherlands. The club competes in the BNXT League and its home arena is MartiniPlaza, which has a seating capacity of 4,350 people.

Founded in 1951, Donar is one of the traditional first division clubs along with Den Bosch, as it entered the league 56 years ago. The club won the Dutch national championship seven times, seven Dutch Cups and three Dutch Supercups. They have also been a regular in European competition, with their best result reaching the FIBA Europe Cup semi-finals in 2018.

The club has the most basketball fans in the Netherlands, with approximately 1,700 season ticket holders and sells the MartiniPlaza out on a regular basis in the playoffs. The MartiniPlaza is also the largest in-use basketball arena in the country. The traditional club colours of Donar are blue and white.

== History ==
In 1881, gymnastics club Wodan and fencing club Mars, both part of the student corps Vindicat, merged to form GSSV Donar. In 1951 the basketball department of this club was founded. In 1970 the club promoted to the highest basketball league.

In 1973 the club separated from Vindicat and got their first sponsor, Nationale-Nederlanden. This allowed the team to play in the much bigger Martinihal "Events hall". On September 20, 1980, Donar won against BOB Oud-Beijerland with a score of 158–58. The score of 158 was repeated that same season against the same team (158–82) and never since. The difference of 100 points has never been repeated.

After the first championship in 1982, Nationale Nederlanden announced to stop as sponsor. After one year of playing under their name, Donar was demoted to the rayon league. Donar became champion that year and promoted to the promotion league. In 1986, Donar returned to the highest league; where they remained ever since. On February 1, 1991, the Basketball Business Club (BBC) was founded. In 2000–01, the Martinihal was remodeled to become Martiniplaza and home games were moved to the new sports hall in the complex. This hall was renovated in 2006 when new seating was placed.

=== 2009–2014: Successful GasTerra years ===
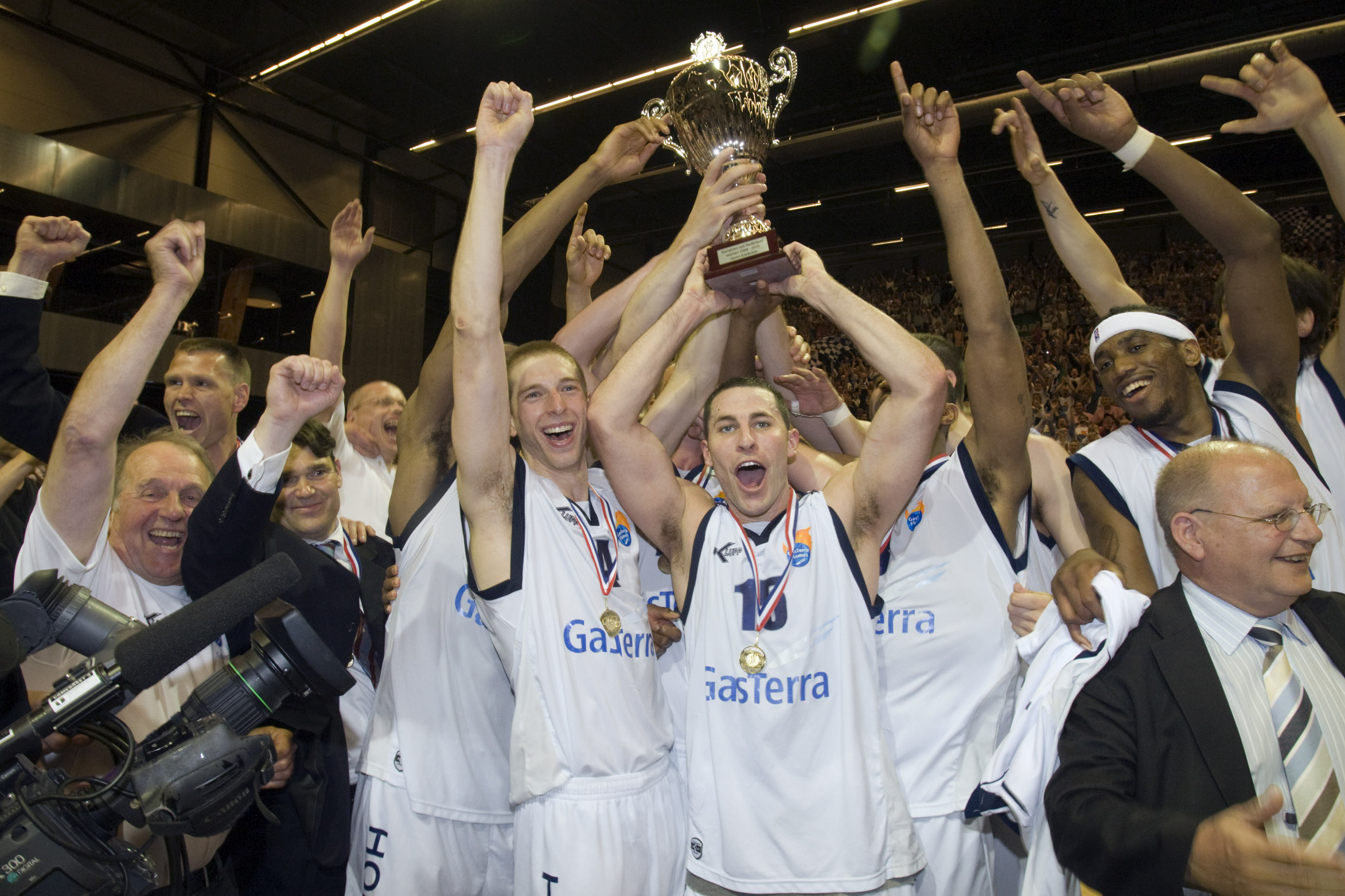
GasTerra Flames celebrating winning the 2010 DBL championship

In 2009 GasTerra became the main sponsor of the club, that was renamed the GasTerra Flames. Head coach Marco van den Berg stayed and a whole new team was put together. In the 2009–10 season, Donar won the 3rd national championship in club history by beating West-Brabant Giants 4–1 in the Finals. Earlier, in the regular season, Flames finished in first place with a 33–3 record. The key players of the team were the Americans Matt Haryasz, Matt Bauscher, Jason Dourisseau and Robby Bostain.

The whole squad that won the 2010 title returned for the next season, except for Tim Blue. In 2010 they became the first Dutch basketball team to take part in the qualifying rounds of the new Euroleague. In the regular season Donar ended on the second place, while Jason Dourisseau was named the Dutch League MVP. The team won a second NBB Cup in 2011, after beating WCAA Giants The team did eventually lost in the DBL Finals to Zorg en Zekerheid Leiden 4–3 in an historic game 7 which included three overtimes.

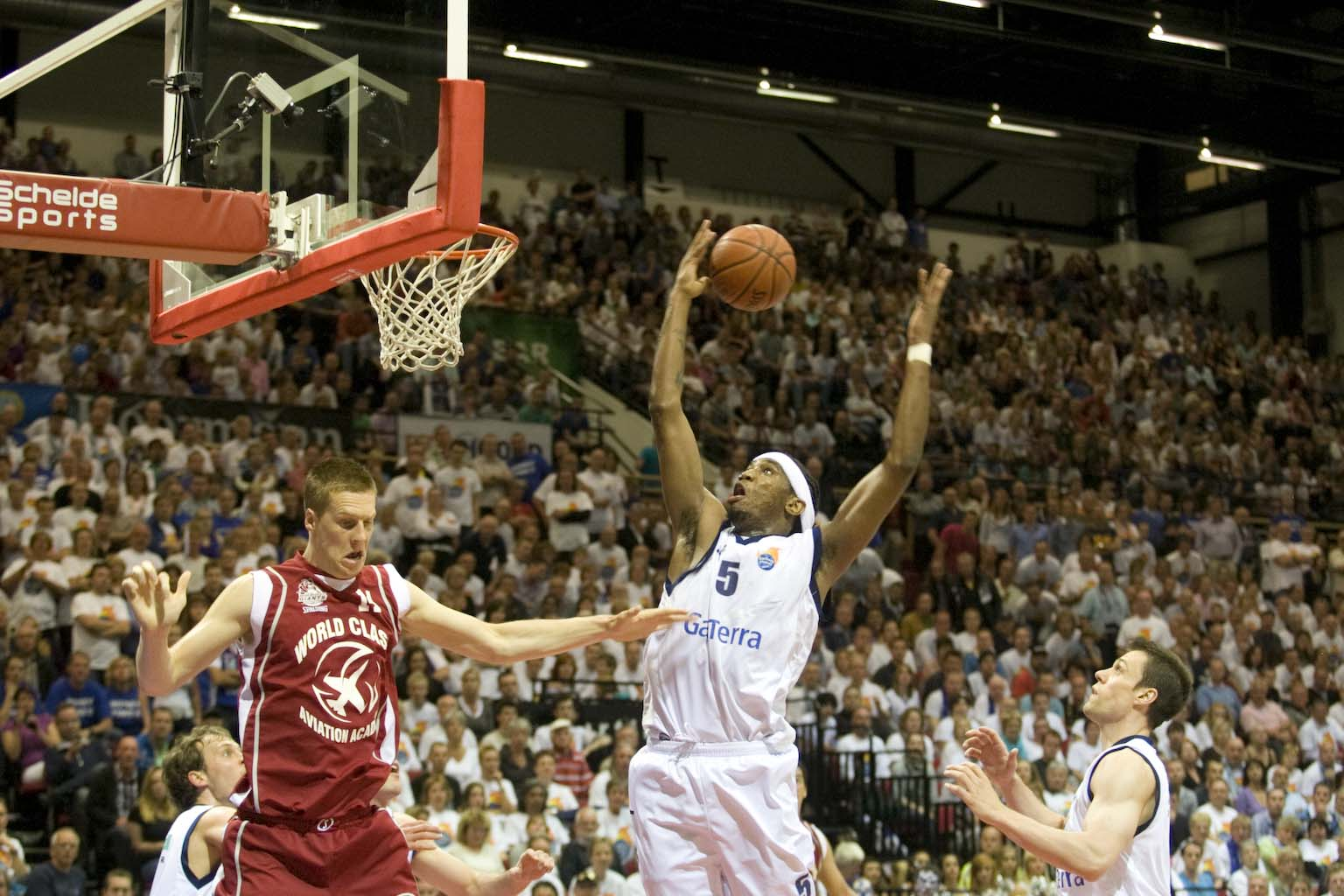
Scene of a Play-off Finals game in 2010

Head coach Marco van den Berg left after the 2010–11 season and Hakim Salem, former ABC Amsterdam coach was acquired. The team brought experienced players to the team like David Bell and Alex Wesby but they couldn't meet the set expectations. In the cup competition, Flames was defeated in the quarterfinals and in the DBL semifinals it lost to EiffelTowers Den Bosch.

During the 2012–13 season Hakim Salem was fired and the Croatian coach Ivica Skelin was acquired. Despite the coaching change, team was still swept 3–0 by Zorg en Zekerheid Leiden in the DBL semifinals.

Before the 2013–14 season it was announced that GasTerra's sponsor contract ended after the season. Flames acquired Dutch top players Arvin Slagter and Ross Bekkering from defending champion ZZ Leiden and three new Americans were added to the team. On March 30, 2014, Flames won the NBB Cup by beating Zorg en Zekerheid Leiden 79–71.

In the 2014 Playoffs Flames beat BC Apollo easily in the quarterfinals (2–0) and later beat ZZ Leiden after a tough series (3–2). On June 1, 2014, Donar won its 4th national title. They beat SPM Shoeters Den Bosch 76–68 in game 7 of the Finals series.

=== 2014–present: Donar ===
In the 2014 offseason, the club announced that in the previous season, a deficit of €135,000 had arisen after mistakes made regarding the budget. Therefore, the club had to cut into costs for the 2014–15 season and the budget was reduced. For the 2014–15 season, the club is known again as "Donar". The team won the Supercup against Leiden and the NBB Cup Final against Den Bosch, the DBL Finals were lost 4–1 against Den Bosch.

==== Braal seasons and European success (2015–2020) ====
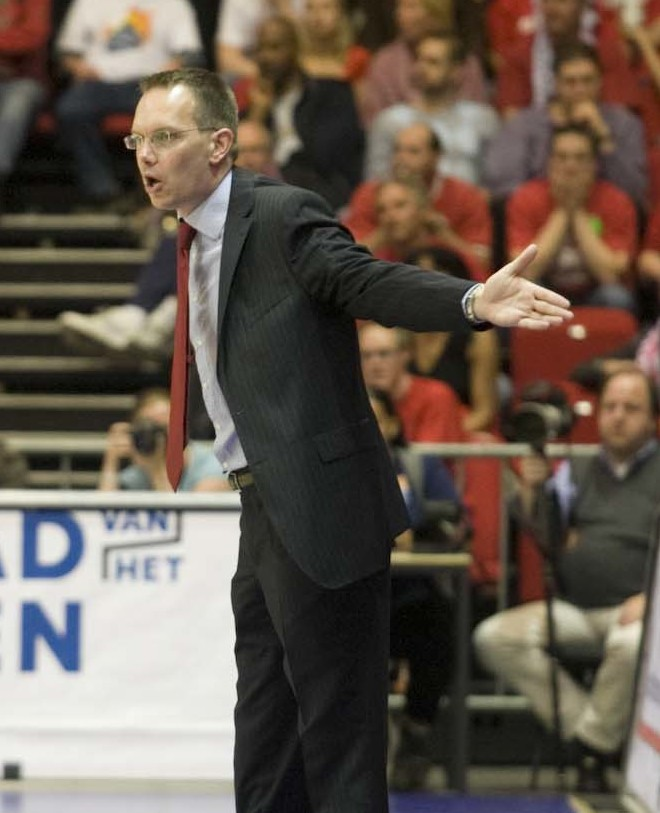
Braal coached Donar to six trophies in five years

In the 2015 offseason, Ivica Skelin left the club and was replaced by Erik Braal who would go on to become the most successful coach in Donar history. In July 2015, former league MVP and club legend Jason Dourisseau returned to Donar. In the 2015–16 season, Donar won its 5th DBL title after beating Landstede 4–1 in the finals.

In the 2016–17 season, Donar reached the second round of the FIBA Europe Cup after being defeated by Tartu in the first qualification round of the Basketball Champions League. This feat would mean Donar's best European performance in club history. The 2016–17 season was also the first season ever to record the triple crown. New Heroes Den Bosch was defeated to win the Supercup, Landstede Basketbal was defeated in the NBB Cup final as well as in the playoff finals (4–1).

In the 2017–18 season, Donar qualified for the FIBA Europe Cup after being defeated in an overtime thriller against Estudiantes in the third and last qualification round of the Basketball Champions League. As a result of the loss Donar was drafted into a Europe Cup group with KK Bosna (Bosnia and Herzegovina), Le Portel (France) and Antwerp Giants (Belgium) in which they finished 2nd. By ending in second place they earned a spot in the second round phase of the Europe Cup, playing in group L against U-BT Cluj-Napoca (Romania), Belfius Mons-Hainaut (Belgium) and Keravnos B.C. (Cyprus). After a home and away win against Cluj, a clear home win against Keravnos (109-69) and a convincing home win against Mons, Donar placed 1st in this group and, for the first time in club history, qualified itself for the Europe Cup play-off phase.

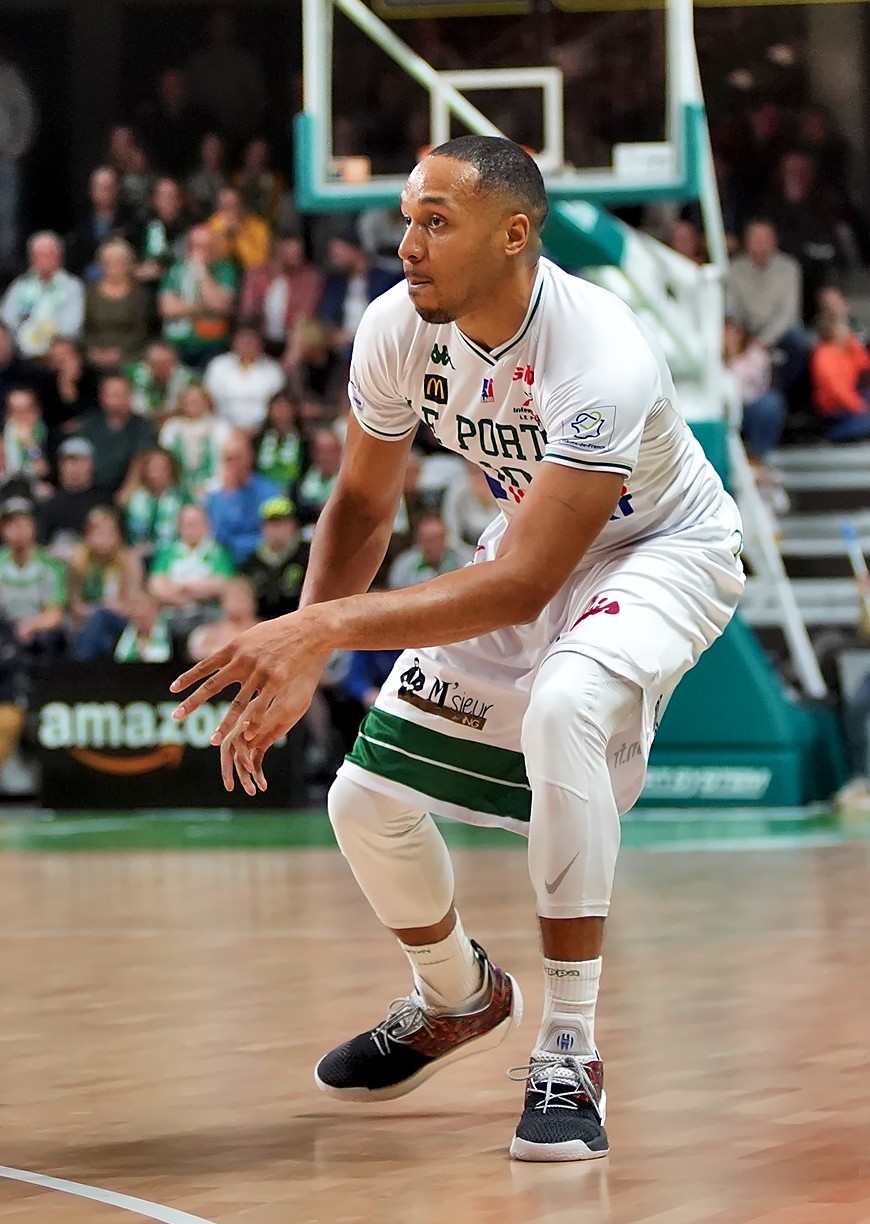
Brandyn Curry was Donar's star player in the 2017–18 season

In the play-offs, Donar beat Cluj-Napoca in the round of 16 and Mornar Bar in the quarter-finals, to reach its first ever European semi-finals. In the semi-finals, Donar lost to the defending Italian champion Reyer Venezia, despite winning the second leg at home. In the 2017–18 DBL season, the club has success as well behind star players Brandyn Curry, named Most Valuable Player and All-DBL Selections Thomas Koenis and Evan Bruinsma. Donar won its third consecutive DBL title on 29 May 2018, after defeating ZZ Leiden 4–0 in the finals.

In the 2018–19 DBL season, Donar struggled and found itself in the fourth place in the regular season. It defeated ZZ Leiden in the semi-finals, 0–3. However, in the finals it lost to second-seeded Landstede. In the 2018–19 FIBA Europe Cup, Donar reached the round of 16 for the second time in history.

The 2019–20 season was cancelled prematurely in March because of the COVID-19 pandemic. Donar was supposed to play in the NBB Cup Final against Aris Leeuwarden. On 14 April, the club announced it parted ways with coach Braal.

==== Difficult years with several head coach changes (2020–2023) ====
On 17 April 2020, Croatian coach Ivan Rudež signed a three-year contract as head coach. On 14 April 2021, Pete Miller was assigned as head coach replacing Rudež after disappointing results. He would finish the season and, after being eliminated 2-1 in the semifinals, return to being head of Donar's youth division.

On 24 May 2021, the club announced former player Matthew Otten as the new head coach. Otten just finished his first season as head coach in the Dutch Basketball League, making it to the Cup Final with Yoast United in their first season in existence. Starting from the 2021–22 season, Donar plays in the newly formed BNXT League, in which the national leagues of Belgium and the Netherlands have merged. Despite a disappointing regular season and an early elimination in Europe and the national play-offs, Donar managed to win its 7th cup this season. Additionally, the finals of the new BNXT Playoffs were reached.

After a disappointing start of the 2022–23 season, head coach Otten was fired and replaced by his assistant Andrej Štimac on 31 October. Under Stimac, Donar was able to turn around the season and was able to reach the finals of the Dutch League for a 13th time. In the series, Donar played ZZ Leiden once again, and narrowly lost the decisive Game 5 in Leiden. In the game, Donar was up by as much as 16 points with 2 minutes and 40 seconds on the clock, before giving up the lead.

==== Bankruptcy and new legal structure (2023) ====
Following the end of the season, in June 2023, the board of Donar came out with a statement that revealed the club was facing serious financial difficulties. At a press conference on 29 June, Donar was revealed to have outstanding debts approximating €1.75 million. A task force was appointed with the goal of saving the club for bankruptcy, who concluded there were insufficient check and balances in the organisation, and financial troubles had been ongoing for three years but were not reported, and that called on supporters and sponsors to invest in the club. After a month of efforts to keep the club alive, the board had to file for bankruptcy due to a high demand from the tax authorities. A trustee was appointed to investigate whether a restart is possible.

The restart was initiated by a group of investors, creating a new company in the form of a besloten vennootschap (bv) under the name Donar Groningen BV. In addition, a new foundation under the name Wij zijn Donar was founded, which used the money collected by supporters to purchase shares from Donar Groningen BV. Donar Groningen BV bought the contracts and the BNXT license from the trustee in order to realize the restart while keeping the club at the highest level of Dutch basketball. However, whether the club was allowed to use the same license was still to be decided by the BNXT license committee.

On the August 28, 2023, the new management announced that Donar Groningen BV was allowed to use the same license and play in the BNXT League in the 2023–24 season under a few conditions. The conditions entailed that no prior board member was allowed in the new management and they received a budget cap of two thirds of their prior budget.

==== Post bankruptcy (2023–2025) ====
Donar began the 2023–24 season with coach Štimac and a reduced player budget, and was eliminated in the semifinals once again. In the following 2024–25 season, Donar had a 3–8 start in the league, and was in the 17th place in the BNXT League in mid-December. On December 3, 2024, the team fired coach Štimac and appointed club legend and assistant coach Jason Dourisseau as the interim head coach for the remainder of the season. Dourisseau led the team with a 10-15 record to a 14th spot in the BNXT and 4th spot in the National ranking. This earned them a spot in the play-offs, in which they won the quarterfinals from Den Helder Suns with 2-0 but were swept by Heroes Den Bosch 0-3 in the semifinals. In addition, Donar reached the finals of the national cup, which they lost. In the 2024-25 season Donar also participated for the first time in the European North Basketball League, a regional European competition. They achieved a 2-6 record, earning them a 7th spot in the group phase which wasn't enough to reach the play-offs.

==== Anniversary season (2025-2026) ====
Donar Groningen celebrated their 75th year anniversary in the 2025-2026 season. The entire season, the club played with an alternate logo and a jersey dedicated to the history of the club. On the 8th of March, the club used the regular season match against Unions Mons Hainaut to celebrate its Anniversary. The team played for a single match in the original colors of Donar, green-red, and with their old logo. In addition festivities were organized and the Donar museum put on a display. Many old players and coaches were present. The team had a successful cup run, reaching the final by defeating rival and title defender Heroes Den Bosch in the semi-finals by 90-68. They defeated Landstede Hammers in a close final 78-77, earning their first prize since the bankruptcy.

The club played like the year before in the ENBL. In the regular season they achieved a 5-3 record, which earned them a spot in the play-offs. This also earned their Coach Jason Dourisseau the title of Coach of the Year. They survived the first round of 16 by defeating BK Opava, earned them a spot in the quarterfinals against number 1 seed Mitteldeutscher BC. In the quarterfinals they lost both matches, 100-81 and 73-80, eliminating them from the tournament.

With only 5 matches to go in the regular season, top performer Dane Erikstrup left the team due to personal reasons. He was replaced by Kilian Martin, a Swiss player who came over from BBC Nyon where he finished his offseason just two days before signing with Donar. Donar reached the play-offs in the second seed, earning them an exemption for the quarterfinals. In the semifinals they faced third seed ZZ Leiden. In the first match Evan Taylor got severely injured and was unable to play further in the playoffs. The roster proved to be too thin to withstand the blows and Donar was eliminated in the five game series by 2-3.

== Club identity ==
=== Names ===
The club has a rich history of names, mainly because of the different main sponsors of the team. Despite having been named differently in the past, "Donar" has always been used by supporters to describe the team and has been used in chants. Since 2014, the team plays under the non-sponsored name Donar.

- 1951–1973 : GSSV Donar
- 1973–1983 : Nationale-Nederlanden Donar
- 1983–1986 : GBV Donar
- 1986–1989 : Ahrend Donar
- 1989–1993 : VGNN Donar
- 1993–1995 : RZG Donar
- 1995–1996 : Celeritas/Donar
- 1996–1999 : RZG Donar
- 1999–2003 : MPC Donar
- 2003–2006 : MPC Capitals
- 2006–2009 : Hanzevast Capitals
- 2009–2014 : GasTerra Flames
- 2014–: Donar

=== Logos ===
After using several different sponsorship logos, Donar announced its current logo in 2014, and features a two-headed eagle, which can also be found on the coat of arms of the city of Groningen. In 2022, the foundation year was added to the logo.

=== Uniforms ===
Traditionally, Donar has played in white jerseys at home and in (navy) blue jerseys in away games.

1981–82	2005–06	2006–07	2009–14	2009–14

== Arenas ==
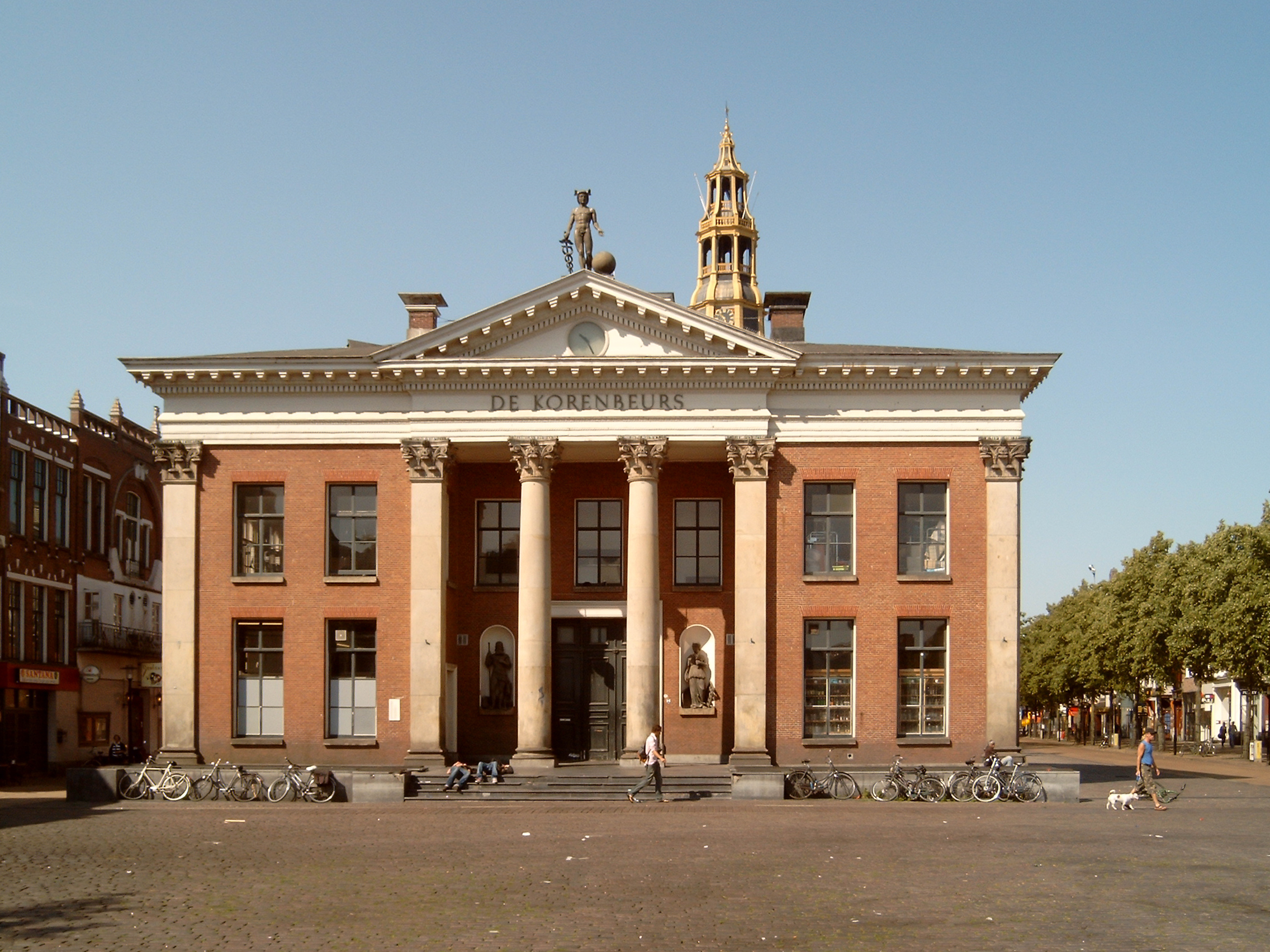
The Korenbeurs was Donar's first home, in the period 1950–59

The MartiniPlaza is the current home arena of Donar, since 2001. The arena is owned by the municipality Groningen which has a cooperation agreement with the club.

Because of unavailability in 2017 for their European games in the, Donar played one FIBA Europe Cup game in Leek (against ESSM Le Portel) and one Basketball Champions League qualifying game in Leeuwarden (against Estudiantes).

The MartiniPlaza has a stand named after the club's legendary players Jason Dourisseau (since 2014) as well as after Thomas Koenis (since 2022).

Home arenas
Arena	Tenure
Korenbeurs	1950–1959
Groente-veilinghal Peizerweg	1959–1973
ACLO-Hal	1967–1973
Evenementenhal	1973–1983
Sporthal Vinkhuizen	1983–1986
Evenementenhal	1986–2001
MartiniPlaza	2001–present

== Players ==
=== Current roster ===
Donar roster
Players
Coaches

Pos.	No.	Nat.	Name	Ht.	Age
SG	0	(United States)	Antoine, Bryan	1.96 m (6 ft 5 in)	26 – 26 April 2000
F/C	1	(United States)	Adebayo, Dola	2.03 m (6 ft 8 in)	23 – 3 July 2003
G	2	(United States)	Godwin, Kevon	1.88 m (6 ft 2 in)	26 – 4 March 2000
C	4	(United States)	DeLoach, Jalen	2.08 m (6 ft 10 in)	24 – 2 April 2002
G	5	(Netherlands)	Uijtendaal, Siem	1.98 m (6 ft 6 in)	25 – 5 May 2001
PG	6	(Netherlands)	Brathwaite, Oshean	1.83 m (6 ft 0 in)	24 – 28 May 2002
PF	7	(Netherlands)	Bergsma, Brandon	2.05 m (6 ft 9 in)	25 – 25 September 2001
G	11	(Netherlands)	Adetunji, Délé	1.91 m (6 ft 3 in)	23 – 5 October 2003
G/F	15	(United States)	McCalister, Michael	1.96 m (6 ft 5 in)	23 – 1 November 2002
F	23	(Georgia (country))	Merkviladze, Aleksandre	2.04 m (6 ft 8 in)	24 – 11 March 2002

Head coach

- (Netherlands) Jason Dourisseau

Assistant coach(es)

- (Netherlands) Yannick Koerts

Legend

- (C) Team captain
- (DP) Development player
- (I) Import player
- Injured

- Roster
Updated: October 4, 2026

Note: Flags indicate national team eligibility at FIBA-sanctioned events. Players may hold other non-FIBA nationalities not displayed.

=== Retired numbers ===
Donar retired numbers
N°	Player	Position	Tenure	Ceremony date
8	Jason Dourisseau	G/F	2009–2014, 2015–2020	23 October 2021
10	Martin de Vries	SG	1979–1983, 1986–1990	Unknown
14	Thomas Koenis	C	2011–2015, 2017–2022	6 December 2022

=== Notable players ===
Note: Flags indicate national team eligibility at FIBA-sanctioned events. Players may hold other non-FIBA nationalities not displayed.

Criteria

To appear in this section a player must have either:

- Set a club record or won an individual award while at the club
- Played at least one official international match for their national team at any time
- Played at least one official NBA match at any time.

- (Netherlands) Leon Williams
- (Croatia) Damjan Rudež
- (United States) Teddy Gipson
- (Netherlands) Jason Dourisseau
- (Netherlands) Thomas Koenis
- (Netherlands) Sean Cunningham
- (Netherlands) Arvin Slagter
- (Croatia) Drago Pašalić
- (United States) Brandyn Curry
- (United States) Evan Bruinsma
- (United States) Lance Jeter
- (United States) Chase Fieler
- (United States) Drew Smith
- (Netherlands) Ross Bekkering
- (United States) Mark Sanchez
- (Netherlands) Yannick Franke
- (Netherlands) Maarten Bouwknecht
- (Netherlands) Jessey Voorn
- (United States) Cashmere Wright
- (United States) Alex Wesby
- (United States) Avis Wyatt
- (United States) Matt Haryasz
- (United States) Torey Thomas
- (Australia) Julian Khazzouh
- (United States) Chris McGuthrie
- (Estonia) Valmo Kriisa
- (United States) Travis Reed
- (Netherlands) Rogier Jansen
- (Netherlands) Kees Akerboom
- (United States) Mack Tuck
- (United States) Donell Thomas
- (United States) Jack Jennings
- (Netherlands) Martin de Vries
- (United States) David Lawrence
- (United States) Pete Miller
- (Socialist Federal Republic of Yugoslavia) Dragutin Čermak

== Staff ==
=== Chairmen ===
- Jan Rijpstra (2007–2008)
- Rob Schuur: (2008–2012)
- Hans Haerkens (2012–2013)
- Gert Kiel (2013–2016)
- Jannes Stokroos: (2016–2023)
- Jakob Klompien (2023–2023)
- Stefan Mladenovic (2024–present)

=== Technical directors ===
- Martin de Vries: (2012–2022)
- Drago Pašalić: (2022–2024)

== Honours ==
Total titles: 16

=== Domestic ===
==== Leagues ====
- Dutch Basketball League

Winners (7): 1981–82, 2003–04, 2009–10, 2013–14, 2015–16, 2016–17, 2017–18
Runners-up (6): 1987–88, 2005–06, 2010–11, 2014–15, 2018–19, 2022–23

==== Cups ====
- Dutch Cup

Winners (8): 2004–05, 2010–11, 2013–14, 2014–15, 2016–17, 2017–18, 2021–22, 2025–26
Runners-up (4): 1996–97, 1999–2000, 2006–07, 2024–25

- Dutch Supercup

Winners (3): 2014, 2016, 2018
Runners-up (6): 2011, 2015, 2017, 2022, 2025, 2026

=== European ===
- FIBA Europe Cup

Semi-finalist (1): 2017–18

== Season by season ==
Season	Tier	League	Pos.	NBB Cup	European competitions		
1970–71	1	Eredivisie	7th	Preliminary round			
1971–72	1	Eredivisie	10th				
1972–73	1	Eredivisie	8th				
1973–74	1	Eredivisie	6th	Preliminary round			
1974–75	1	Eredivisie	8th				
1975–76	1	Eredivisie	7th	Preliminary round			
1976–77	1	Eredivisie	4th				
1977–78	1	Eredivisie	3rd				
1978–79	1	Eredivisie	3rd				
1979–80	1	Eredivisie	4th				
1980–81	1	Eredivisie	5th				
1981–82	1	Eredivisie	1st				
1982–83	1	Eredivisie	4th				
1983–86	Lower divisions						
1986–87	1	Eredivisie	4th				
1987–88	1	Eredivisie	7th				
1988–89	1	Eredivisie	8th				
1989–90	1	Eredivisie	3rd				
1990–91	1	Eredivisie	4th				
1991–92	1	Eredivisie	4th	Quarterfinalist			
1992–93	1	Eredivisie	5th	Quarterfinalist			
1993–94	1	Eredivisie	5th	Semifinalist			
1994–95	1	Eredivisie	4th				
1995–96	1	Eredivisie	5th				
1996–97	1	Eredivisie	3rd	Runner–up			
1997–98	1	Eredivisie	2nd	Semifinalist			
1998–99	1	Eredivisie	6th	Quarterfinalist			
1999–00	1	Eredivisie	5th	Runner–up			
2000–01	1	Eredivisie	3rd	Quarterfinalist			
2001–02	1	Eredivisie	5th	Semifinalist			
2002–03	1	Eredivisie	7th	Quarterfinalist			
2003–04	1	Eredivisie	1st	Semifinalist			
2004–05	1	Eredivisie	5th	Champion	2 ULEB Cup	RS	3–7
2005–06	1	Eredivisie	2nd	Fourth round	3 FIBA EuroCup	RS	2–4
2006–07	1	Eredivisie	5th	Runner–up			
2007–08	1	Eredivisie	5th	Quarterfinalist	2 ULEB Cup	RS	2–8
2008–09	1	Eredivisie	3rd	Quarterfinalist			
2009–10	1	Eredivisie	1st	Semifinalist			
2010–11	1	DBL	2nd	Champion	1 Euroleague	QR1	0–2
2010–11	1	DBL	2nd	Champion	2 Eurocup	RS	1–5
2011–12	1	DBL	3rd	Quarterfinalist	2 Eurocup	RS	0–6
2012–13	1	DBL	3rd	Fourth round			
2013–14	1	DBL	1st	Champion	3 EuroChallenge	RS	2–4
2014–15	1	DBL	2nd	Champion			
2015–16	1	DBL	1st	Eightfinal	3 FIBA Europe Cup	RS	2–4
2016–17	1	DBL	1st	Champion	3 Champions League	QR1	0–1–1
2016–17	1	DBL	1st	Champion	4 FIBA Europe Cup	R2	8–4
2017–18	1	DBL	1st	Champion	3 Champions League	QR3	2–1–3
2017–18	1	DBL	1st	Champion	4 FIBA Europe Cup	SF	5-2
2018–19	1	DBL	2nd	Semifinalist	3 Champions League	QR2	1-3
2018–19	1	DBL	2nd	Semifinalist	4 FIBA Europe Cup	R16	7–7
2019–20	1	DBL	2nd (Note: The 2019–20 season was cancelled in March because of the COVID-19 pandemic.)	Finalist (Note: The 2019–20 Basketball Cup final was postponed and later cancelled after finalist Aris Leeuwarden did not agree to play in the next season.)	3 Champions League	QR1	1–1
2019–20	1	DBL	2nd	Finalist	4 FIBA Europe Cup	RS	2–4
2020–21	1	DBL	3rd	Quarterfinalist	4 Champions League	QR2	1–1
2020–21	1	DBL	3rd	Quarterfinalist	4 FIBA Europe Cup	RS	0–2
2021–22	1	BNXT League	NL 3rd	Champion	4 FIBA Europe Cup	RS	2–4
2021–22	1	BNXT League	BNXT 2nd	Champion	4 FIBA Europe Cup	RS	2–4
2022–23	1	BNXT League	NL 2nd	Semifinalist	4 FIBA Europe Cup	RS	0–6
2022–23	1	BNXT League	BNXT Quarterfinalist	Semifinalist	4 FIBA Europe Cup	RS	0–6
2023–24	1	BNXT League	NL 4th	Quarterfinalist	4 FIBA Europe Cup	QT	1–2
2023–24	1	BNXT League	BNXT DNQ	Quarterfinalist	4 FIBA Europe Cup	QT	1–2
2024–25	1	BNXT League	NL 4th	Runner-up	R European North Basketball League	RS	2-6
2024–25	1	BNXT League	BNXT 14th	Runner-up	R European North Basketball League	RS	2-6
2025–26	1	BNXT League	NL 4th	Champion	R European North Basketball League	QF	6-5
2025–26	1	BNXT League	BNXT 7th	Champion	R European North Basketball League	QF	6-5
2026–27	1	BNXT League	NL TBD	Eightfinalist	R European North Basketball League	RS	0-0
2026–27	1	BNXT League	BNXT TBD	Eightfinalist	R European North Basketball League	RS	0-0

=== European record ===
Donar has played in Europe since the 1974–75 season, when it made its debut in the 1974–75. On 5 November 1974, Donar played its first European game away against Luxembourg club Etzella, winning 78–110.

Donar played in the qualifying rounds of the EuroLeague once, losing in the first qualifying round of the 2010–11 season to UNICS Kazan.

The best performance of the team was reaching the semi-finals of the 2017–18 FIBA Europe Cup, losing to Italian champions and later winners Reyer Venezia. Donar reached the knockout stage of the FIBA Europe Cup twice (2018 and 2019). They have played in the qualifying rounds of the Basketball Champions League five times (from 2016 to 2020), without qualifying.

== Individual awards ==
DBL Most Valuable Player
- David Lawrence – 1983
- Jack Jennings – 1993
- Donnell Thomas - 1998
- Mack Tuck - 2002
- Travis Reed - 2004
- Jason Dourisseau - 2011
- Arvin Slagter – 2014
- Lance Jeter – 2015, 2017
- Brandyn Curry – 2018

DBL Playoffs MVP

- Arvin Slagter – 2014
- Lance Jeter – 2016
- Chase Fieler – 2017
- Brandyn Curry – 2018

All-DBL Team

- Lamont Randolph – 2002
- Travis Young – 2003, 2004, 2005
- Travis Reed – 2004, 2005, 2006
- Matt Haryasz – 2010, 2011
- Jason Dourisseau – 2011
- Arvin Slagter – 2014
- Cashmere Wright – 2014
- Lance Jeter – 2015, 2016, 2017
- Mark Sanchez – 2015
- Ross Bekkering – 2016
- Drago Pašalić – 2017
- Chase Fieler – 2017
- Brandyn Curry – 2018
- Evan Bruinsma – 2018
- Thomas Koenis – 2018
- Jarred Ogungbemi-Jackson – 2021

DBL Coach of the Year

- Jim Parks - 1978
- Jan Willem Jansen - 1991
- Glenn Pinas – 1995, 1996, 1997
- Ivica Skelin – 2014, 2015
- Erik Braal – 2017, 2018

DBL Defensive Player of the Year

- Jason Dourisseau – 2013, 2014
- Sean Cunningham – 2018

DBL Statistical Player of the Year

- Ross Bekkering – 2016
- Chase Fieler – 2017
- Brandyn Curry – 2018

DBL Most Improved Player

- Rienk Mast – 2019

DBL MVP Under 23

- Thomas Koenis – 2012
- Jessey Voorn – 2013
- Rienk Mast - 2019

DBL All-Rookie Team

- Rienk Mast – 2018
- Shane Hammink – 2019

== U19 ==
Donar U19, also known as Donar Groningen U19, is the youth branch of Donar. The team competes in the M19 Eredivisie, the highest level of youth basketball in the Netherlands. The team plays their matches in the Sporthal Vinkhuizen. Many players that came through the Donar youth teams later became professional basketball players, like Rienk Mast, Kjeld Zuidema and Tim Hoeve.

In the season 2024-25, the team placed third after the regular season and qualified for the post-season. In the play-offs they managed to win the Dutch under 19 national championship by defeating Leiden in the finals with 73-58. Due to their national championship, the team was also voted as Sports team of the year 2025 in the city of Groningen.

Season by season results are:

Season	Tier	League	Pos.	Dutch Cup	European competitions	
2023-24	1	M19 Eredivisie	8th	Quarterfinals	HNBT	6th
2024-25	1	M19 Eredivisie	Champions	Quarterfinals	HNBT	
2025-26	1	M19 Eredivisie	3rd	Quarterfinals	HNBT	6th
2026-27	1	M19 Eredivisie		First round	HNBT	

== Supporters club ==
The current supporters club was founded on August 26, 1997, under the name Vikings, a nod to the Norse god Donar (Thor). After the club lost Donar from its name, this link became less clear. In 2010 it was decided to change the name of the supporters club to SV Donar (Supporters club Donar). The supporters club had 330 members as of the start of season 2010–11.

== List of head coaches ==
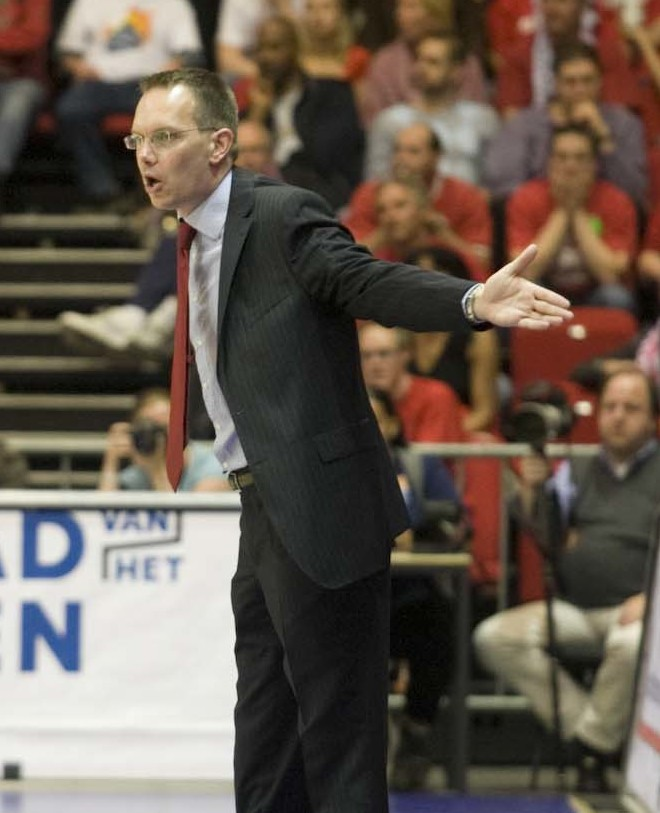
Erik Braal holds the record for most championships won with Donar

Coach	From	To	Honours
(Netherlands) Klaas Bruin	1967	1971	
(Netherlands) Ruud Skála	1971	1973	
(Netherlands) Hans Perrier	1973	1975	
(United States) Bob Kloppenburg	1976	1977	
(United States) Jim Parks	1977	1978	
(United States) Pat Stewawrt	1978	1979	
(United States) Chuck Campione	1979	1980	
(Netherlands) Jan Kamman	1980		
(Netherlands) Maarten van Gent	1980	1982	1 Dutch League
(United States) Bill Sheridan	1982	1983	-
(Netherlands) Jan Kamman	1983	1985	-
(Netherlands) Jan Castelein	1985	1986	-
(Suriname) Rupport Clements	1986	1988	-
(Netherlands) Jan Willem Jansen	1988	1991	-
(Netherlands) Marten Scheepstra	1991	1992	-
(Suriname) Glenn Pinas	1993	2002	-
(Netherlands) Ton Boot	2003	2007	1 Dutch League, 1 NBB Cup
(Spain) Pep Clarós	2007	2008	–
(Netherlands) Marco van den Berg	2008	2011	1 Dutch League, 1 NBB Cup
(Netherlands) Hakim Salem	2011	December 2012	–
(Croatia) Ivica Skelin	January 2013	2015	1 Dutch League, 2 NBB Cups, 1 Supercup
(Netherlands) Erik Braal	2015	2020	3 Dutch League, 2 NBB Cups, 2 Supercups
(Croatia) Ivan Rudež	2020	April 2021	–
(United States) Pete Miller (Note: Interim after the release of Ivan Rudež.)	April 2021	May 2021	–
(United States) Matthew Otten	2021	October 2022	1 NBB Cup
(Croatia) Andrej Štimac (Note: Initially hired as interim head coach after the release of Matthew Otten on 13 October 2022. He was later appointed as head coach for two seasons.)	October 2022	December 2024	
(Netherlands) Jason Dourisseau	December 2024	present	1 NBB Cup
