= 2024–25 Swiss Women's Basketball Championship =

Women's basketball league in Switzerland

Swiss Women's Basketball Championship
- Season: 2024–25
- Dates: Regular season: 28 September 2024 – 1 February 2025; Winners and losers stage: 18 February – 22 March 2025; Play Offs: 25 March – 27 April 2025
- Teams: 9

Regular season
- Season MVP: (United States) Sam Breen

Finals
- Champions: Nyon Basket Feminin (4th title)
- Runners-up: BCF Elfic Fribourg
- Finals MVP: (United States) Sam Breen

Statistical leaders
Points	(United States) Shannon Ryan	23.3
Rebounds	(United States) Shannon Ryan	17.4
Assists	(United States) J'aiamoni Welch-Coleman	5.8
Steals	(United States) Mykea Gray	4.2
Blocks	(Germany) Annika Soltau	1.8

The 2024–25 Swiss Women's Basketball Championship is the 85th season of the top division women's basketball league in Switzerland since its establishment in 1940. It starts in September 2024 with the first round of the regular season and ends in April 2025.

BCF Elfic Fribourg are the defending champions.

Nyon Basket Feminin won their fourth title after beating BCF Elfic Fribourg in the final.

== Format ==
In the first round, each team plays each other twice. The top five progress to the winners stage while the bottom four advance to the losers stage. In the winners stage, teams play each other once and every team reaches the play offs. In the losers stage, teams play each other once and the teams who finish in sixth, seventh and eighth place advance to the play offs. The quarterfinals are a two legged aggregate tie, the semifinals is played as a best of three series and the final is a best of five series.

== Regular season ==
Pos	Team	Pld	W	L	PF	PA	PD	Pts	Qualification
1	BCF Elfic Fribourg	16	16	0	1423	893	+530	32	Winners stage
2	Nyon Basket Feminin	16	14	2	1341	1004	+337	30	Winners stage
3	Baden Basket 54	16	11	5	1307	1210	+97	27	Winners stage
4	Genève LPLO	16	9	7	1283	1195	+88	25 (Note: Genève LPLO 161–153 BBC Troistorrents)	Winners stage
5	BBC Troistorrents	16	9	7	1187	1180	+7	25	Winners stage
6	BC Alte Kanti Aarau	16	6	10	1008	1220	−212	22	Losers stage
7	Hélios VS Basket	16	4	12	1003	1236	−233	20	Losers stage
8	Espérance Sportive Pully	16	2	14	1064	1287	−223	18	Losers stage
9	Riva Basket	16	1	15	944	1335	−391	17	Losers stage

Source: Swiss Women's Basketball Championship
Rules for classification: 1) Points; 2) Points difference; 3) Points scored.

=== Winners stage ===
Pos	Team	Pld	W	L	PF	PA	PD	Pts	Qualification
1	BCF Elfic Fribourg	20	19	1	1786	1178	+608	39	Play Offs
2	Nyon Basket Feminin	20	18	2	1680	1268	+412	38	Play Offs
3	Baden Basket 54	20	12	8	1576	1544	+32	32	Play Offs
4	Genève LPLO	20	11	9	1586	1495	+91	31	Play Offs
5	BBC Troistorrents	20	9	11	1445	1529	−84	29	Play Offs

Source: Swiss Women's Basketball Championship
Rules for classification: 1) Points; 2) Points difference; 3) Points scored.

=== Losers stage ===
Pos	Team	Pld	W	L	PF	PA	PD	Pts	Qualification
6	BC Alte Kanti Aarau	22	10	12	1419	1597	−178	32	Play Offs
7	Hélios VS Basket	22	8	14	1438	1668	−230	30	Play Offs
8	Espérance Sportive Pully	22	5	17	1485	1717	−232	27	Play Offs
9	Riva Basket	22	2	20	1329	1748	−419	24	

Source: Swiss Women's Basketball Championship
Rules for classification: 1) Points; 2) Points difference; 3) Points scored.

== Play offs ==
Quarterfinals
1	BCF Elfic Fribourg	87	83	2
8	Espérance Sportive Pully	54	57	0
4	Genève LPLO	93	80	2
5	BBC Troistorrents	73	68	0
2	Nyon Basket Feminin	91	101	2
7	Hélios VS Basket	65	70	0
3	Baden Basket 54	65	76	2
6	BC Alte Kanti Aarau	63	61	0

Semifinals
1	BCF Elfic Fribourg	95	75	2
4	Genève LPLO	64	60	0
2	Nyon Basket Feminin	107	96	2
3	Baden Basket 54	64	65	0

Final
1	BCF Elfic Fribourg	89	65	66	58	1
2	Nyon Basket Feminin	73	74	84	69	3

Champions of Switzerland

Nyon Basket Feminin
Fourth title
