= EuroBasket Women 2025 squads =

This article displays the rosters for the teams competing at the EuroBasket Women 2025. Each team had to submit 12 players.

Age and club are as of 18 June 2025, the start of the tournament.

== Group A ==
=== France ===
The roster was announced on 14 June 2025.

France women's national basketball roster
Players
Coaches

Pos.	No.	Name	Age – Date of birth	Height	Club	Ctr.
PF	1	Noémie Brochant	25 – 25 October 1999	1.78 m (5 ft 10 in)	Flammes Carolo	(Italy)
SF	2	Marie-Paule Foppossi	27 – 28 January 1998	1.89 m (6 ft 2 in)	ESB Villeneuve-d'Ascq	(France)
SF	11	Valériane Vukosavljević (C)	31 – 29 April 1994	1.84 m (6 ft 0 in)	USK Praha	(Czech Republic)
C	12	Iliana Rupert	23 – 12 July 2001	1.94 m (6 ft 4 in)	Çukurova Basketbol	(Turkey)
F	13	Janelle Salaün	23 – 5 September 2001	1.88 m (6 ft 2 in)	PF Schio	(Italy)
C	22	Marième Badiane	30 – 24 November 1994	1.90 m (6 ft 3 in)	Fenerbahçe	(Turkey)
SG	28	Mamignan Touré	30 – 19 December 1994	1.80 m (5 ft 11 in)	Spar Girona	(Spain)
SG	32	Tima Pouye	26 – 7 April 1999	1.75 m (5 ft 9 in)	Tango Bourges Basket	(France)
C	33	Maëva Djaldi-Tabdi	26 – 3 December 1998	1.87 m (6 ft 2 in)	Charnay	(France)
G	42	Leïla Lacan	21 – 2 June 2004	1.81 m (5 ft 11 in)	Basket Landes	(France)
PG	47	Romane Bernies	31 – 27 June 1993	1.70 m (5 ft 7 in)	BLMA	(France)
G	98	Pauline Astier	23 – 15 February 2002	1.81 m (5 ft 11 in)	Tango Bourges Basket	(France)

Head coach

- (Senegal) Jean-Aimé Toupane

Assistant coach(es)

- (France) David Gautier

Legend

- (C) Team captain
- Club – describes last
  club before the tournament
- Age – describes age
  on 18 June 2025

=== Greece ===
A 17-player roster was announced on 5 May 2025. The final squad was revealed on 15 June 2025.

Greece women's national basketball team roster
Players
Coaches

Pos.	No.	Name	Age – Date of birth	Height	Club	Ctr.
PG	3	Ioanna Krimili	23 – 16 July 2001	1.78 m (5 ft 10 in)	Panathinaikos	(Greece)
SF	5	Eleni Bosgana	21 – 4 December 2003	1.90 m (6 ft 3 in)	CB Leganés	(Spain)
PG	8	Pinelopi Pavlopoulou	29 – 3 March 1996	1.72 m (5 ft 8 in)	Athinaikos	(Greece)
PG	11	Angeliki Nikolopoulou	34 – 2 May 1991	1.78 m (5 ft 10 in)	Olympiacos	(Greece)
C	13	Vasiliki Louka	28 – 5 July 1996	1.93 m (6 ft 4 in)	Athinaikos	(Greece)
PF	15	Artemis Spanou (C)	32 – 1 January 1993	1.86 m (6 ft 1 in)	BK Brno	(Czech Republic)
F	18	Ioanna Chatzileonti	23 – 5 January 2002	1.84 m (6 ft 0 in)	Panathinaikos	(Greece)
SG	21	Eleanna Christinaki	28 – 16 December 1996	1.84 m (6 ft 0 in)	Olympiacos	(Greece)
F	24	Robyn Parks	32 – 19 July 1992	1.85 m (6 ft 1 in)	Athinaikos	(Greece)
F	25	Antigoni Chairistanidou	34 – 3 October 1990	1.86 m (6 ft 1 in)	Athinaikos	(Greece)
C	34	Mariella Fasoula	27 – 2 September 1997	1.92 m (6 ft 4 in)	Beşiktaş	(Turkey)
SF	44	Zafeirenia Karlafti	27 – 8 June 1998	1.82 m (6 ft 0 in)	Olympiacos	(Greece)

Head coach

- (Greece) Petros Prekas

Assistant coach(es)

- (Greece) Dimitra Kalentzou

Legend

- (C) Team captain
- Club – describes last
  club before the tournament
- Age – describes age
  on 18 June 2025

=== Switzerland ===
A 13-player roster was announced on 6 June 2025. The final squad was revealed on 15 June 2025.

Switzerland women's national basketball team roster
Players
Coaches

Pos.	No.	Name	Age – Date of birth	Height	Club	Ctr.
G	2	Laure Margot	26 – 12 June 1999	1.73 m (5 ft 8 in)	Nyon Basket Feminin	(Switzerland)
G	4	Nadia Constantin	28 – 10 February 1997	1.70 m (5 ft 7 in)	BBC Troistorrents-Chablais	(Switzerland)
PG	7	Viktoria Ranisavljevic	19 – 30 July 2005	1.70 m (5 ft 7 in)	Elfic Fribourg	(Switzerland)
F	11	Shannon Hatch	31 – 23 October 1993	1.78 m (5 ft 10 in)	Newcastle Eagles	(United Kingdom)
SG	12	Indira Vilolo Dos Santos	21 – 15 February 2004	1.76 m (5 ft 9 in)	Nyon Basket Feminin	(Switzerland)
PF	13	Léa Favre	28 – 27 January 1997	1.83 m (6 ft 0 in)	Pallacanestro Valdarno	(Italy)
C	15	Lana Wenger	22 – 13 January 2003	1.93 m (6 ft 4 in)	Portland State Vikings	(United States)
F	18	Lin Schwarz	21 – 21 November 2003	1.86 m (6 ft 1 in)	BC Castors Braine	(Belgium)
F	19	Eléa Jacquot	23 – 15 October 2001	1.82 m (6 ft 0 in)	Elfic Fribourg	(Switzerland)
SG	24	Evita Herminjard (C)	27 – 15 February 1998	1.72 m (5 ft 8 in)	Piešťanské Čajky	(Slovakia)
PG	25	Nancy Fora	27 – 17 September 1997	1.72 m (5 ft 8 in)	Tarbes Gespe Bigorre	(France)
PF	98	Yverline Da Silva	27 – 19 January 1998	1.82 m (6 ft 0 in)	Geneve LPLO	(Switzerland)

Head coach

- (France) François Gomez

Assistant coach(es)

- (Switzerland) Romain Gaspoz

Legend

- (C) Team captain
- Club – describes last
  club before the tournament
- Age – describes age
  on 18 June 2025

=== Turkey ===
A 20-player roster was announced on 30 April 2025. The final squad was revealed on 17 June 2025.

Turkey women's national basketball team roster
Players
Coaches

Pos.	No.	Name	Age – Date of birth	Height	Club	Ctr.
PF	1	Elif İstanbulluoğlu	20 – 4 April 2005	1.88 m (6 ft 2 in)	Louisville Cardinals	(United States)
SG	2	Sevgi Uzun	27 – 25 November 1997	1.78 m (5 ft 10 in)	Fenerbahçe	(Turkey)
PG	4	Olcay Çakır (C)	31 – 13 July 1993	1.82 m (6 ft 0 in)	Fenerbahçe	(Turkey)
SF	6	Gökşen Fitik	23 – 11 August 2001	1.75 m (5 ft 9 in)	Galatasaray	(Turkey)
C	7	Teaira McCowan	28 – 28 September 1996	2.04 m (6 ft 8 in)	Dallas Wings	(United States)
PG	9	Pelin Bilgiç	30 – 15 July 1994	1.73 m (5 ft 8 in)	Beşiktaş	(Turkey)
PG	10	Alperi Onar	29 – 2 January 1996	1.70 m (5 ft 7 in)	Fenerbahçe	(Turkey)
PF	11	Elif Bayram	23 – 18 September 2001	1.85 m (6 ft 1 in)	Galatasaray	(Turkey)
PF	15	Tilbe Şenyürek	30 – 26 April 1995	1.92 m (6 ft 4 in)	Fenerbahçe	(Turkey)
PG	17	Derin Erdoğan	22 – 28 June 2002	1.70 m (5 ft 7 in)	Galatasaray	(Turkey)
SF	20	Sinem Ataş	30 – 1 January 1995	1.85 m (6 ft 1 in)	Çukurova Basketbol	(Turkey)
C	33	Esra Ural	33 – 18 August 1991	1.98 m (6 ft 6 in)	Çukurova Basketbol	(Turkey)

Head coach

- (Turkey) Ekrem Memnun

Assistant coach(es)

- (Turkey) Firat Okul

Legend

- (C) Team captain
- Club – describes last
  club before the tournament
- Age – describes age
  on 18 June 2025

== Group B ==
=== Italy ===
A 19-player roster was announced on 14 May 2025. The final squad was revealed on 17 June 2025.

Italy women's national basketball team roster
Players
Coaches

Pos.	No.	Name	Age – Date of birth	Height	Club	Ctr.
PF	0	Jasmine Keys	27 – 8 October 1997	1.87 m (6 ft 2 in)	PF Schio	(Italy)
G	6	Francesca Pasa	25 – 22 May 2000	1.75 m (5 ft 9 in)	ASVEL Féminin	(France)
SG	8	Costanza Verona	25 – 6 August 1999	1.70 m (5 ft 7 in)	PF Schio	(Italy)
SF	9	Cecilia Zandalasini	29 – 16 March 1996	1.86 m (6 ft 1 in)	PF Schio	(Italy)
SG	11	Francesca Pan	28 – 27 May 1997	1.83 m (6 ft 0 in)	Reyer Venezia	(Italy)
C	13	Lorela Cubaj	26 – 8 January 1999	1.92 m (6 ft 4 in)	Reyer Venezia	(Italy)
PF	14	Sara Madera	24 – 28 June 2000	1.87 m (6 ft 2 in)	Magnolia Basket Campobasso	(Italy)
PG	18	Mariella Santucci	28 – 18 June 1997	1.70 m (5 ft 7 in)	Reyer Venezia	(Italy)
SG	19	Martina Fassina	26 – 7 April 1999	1.83 m (6 ft 0 in)	Reyer Venezia	(Italy)
C	22	Olbis André	26 – 25 December 1998	1.92 m (6 ft 4 in)	PF Schio	(Italy)
SF	23	Laura Spreafico (C)	33 – 19 June 1991	1.82 m (6 ft 0 in)	Geas Basket	(Italy)
G	99	Stefania Trimboli	28 – 30 October 1996	1.76 m (5 ft 9 in)	Magnolia Basket Campobasso	(Italy)

Head coach

- (Italy) Andrea Capobianco

Assistant coach(es)

- (Italy) Vincenzo Di Meglio

Legend

- (C) Team captain
- Club – describes last
  club before the tournament
- Age – describes age
  on 18 June 2025

=== Lithuania ===
The roster was announced on 9 June 2025.

Lithuania women's national basketball team roster
Players
Coaches

Pos.	No.	Name	Age – Date of birth	Height	Club	Ctr.
SF	4	Justė Jocytė	19 – 19 November 2005	1.84 m (6 ft 0 in)	Uni Girona	(Spain)
SG	6	Kamilė Nacickaitė	35 – 28 December 1989	1.82 m (6 ft 0 in)	Tango Bourges Basket	(France)
PF	8	Gerda Raulušaitytė	20 – 11 September 2004	1.87 m (6 ft 2 in)	Tarptautinis universitetas	(Lithuania)
SF	11	Brigita Sinickaitė	24 – 1 February 2001	1.74 m (5 ft 9 in)	Neptunas-Amberton	(Lithuania)
SF	12	Laura Juškaitė (C)	27 – 22 September 1997	1.86 m (6 ft 1 in)	BK Brno	(Czech Republic)
C	14	Eglė Šikšniūtė	34 – 16 May 1991	1.98 m (6 ft 6 in)	Neptunas-Amberton	(Lithuania)
SF	17	Gabija Meškonytė	27 – 30 April 1998	1.82 m (6 ft 0 in)	Kibirkštis Vilnius	(Lithuania)
PF	18	Monika Grigalauskytė	33 – 17 February 1992	1.91 m (6 ft 3 in)	Diósgyőri VTK	(Hungary)
PF	21	Laura Miškinienė	32 – 28 October 1992	1.90 m (6 ft 3 in)	AZS Poznań	(Poland)
SF	22	Eglė Zabotkaitė	25 – 24 January 2000	1.75 m (5 ft 9 in)	Kibirkštis Vilnius	(Lithuania)
PG	44	Dalia Donskichytė	25 – 14 April 2000	1.65 m (5 ft 5 in)	Šiauliai-Vilmers	(Lithuania)
C	77	Giedrė Labuckienė	34 – 15 July 1990	1.90 m (6 ft 3 in)	Kibirkštis Vilnius	(Lithuania)

Head coach

- (Lithuania) Vilius Stanišauskas

Assistant coach(es)

- (Lithuania) Tomas Rinkevičius

Legend

- (C) Team captain
- Club – describes last
  club before the tournament
- Age – describes age
  on 18 June 2025

=== Serbia ===
A 15-player roster was announced on 16 June 2025. The final squad was revealed on 17 June 2025.

Serbia women's national basketball team roster
Players
Coaches

Pos.	No.	Name	Age – Date of birth	Height	Club	Ctr.
PF	1	Ivana Raca	25 – 10 September 1999	1.88 m (6 ft 2 in)	Athinaikos	(Greece)
SG	3	Nevena Rosić	22 – 5 January 2003	1.76 m (5 ft 9 in)	Rutronik Stars Keltern	(Germany)
PG	12	Yvonne Anderson	35 – 8 March 1990	1.75 m (5 ft 9 in)	ŽKK Crvena zvezda	(Serbia)
C	16	Marta Mitrović	23 – 16 March 2002	1.85 m (6 ft 1 in)	ŽKK Crvena zvezda	(Serbia)
SF	17	Jovana Nogić	27 – 17 December 1997	1.81 m (5 ft 11 in)	UMMC Ekaterinburg	(Russia)
F	24	Teodora Turudić	25 – 19 July 1999	1.80 m (5 ft 11 in)	ŽKK Crvena zvezda	(Serbia)
SF	25	Maša Janković	25 – 1 February 2000	1.87 m (6 ft 2 in)	Gernika KESB	(Spain)
SF	26	Jovana Boričić	22 – 9 May 2003	1.77 m (5 ft 10 in)	Vasas SC	(Hungary)
PG	28	Jovana Popović	17 – 5 October 2007	1.75 m (5 ft 9 in)	ŽKK Art Basket	(Serbia)
PF	32	Angela Dugalić	23 – 29 December 2001	1.93 m (6 ft 4 in)	UCLA Bruins	(United States)
PG	40	Ivana Katanić	26 – 16 April 1999	1.74 m (5 ft 9 in)	ŽKK Crvena zvezda	(Serbia)
PF	51	Mina Đorđević (C)	26 – 23 February 1999	1.86 m (6 ft 1 in)	ŽKK Crvena zvezda	(Serbia)

Head coach

- (Serbia) Marina Maljković

Assistant coach(es)

- (Serbia) Ljubica Drljača

Legend

- (C) Team captain
- Club – describes last
  club before the tournament
- Age – describes age
  on 18 June 2025

=== Slovenia ===
The roster was announced on 16 June 2025.

Slovenia women's national basketball team roster
Players
Coaches

Pos.	No.	Name	Age – Date of birth	Height	Club	Ctr.
C	1	Eva Lisec	30 – 17 June 1995	1.92 m (6 ft 4 in)	UMMC Ekaterinburg	(Russia)
SG	3	Teja Oblak (C)	34 – 20 December 1990	1.72 m (5 ft 8 in)	Galatasaray	(Turkey)
SG	5	Tina Cvijanovič	27 – 4 March 1998	1.78 m (5 ft 10 in)	San Martino di Lupari	(Italy)
PF	7	Maruša Seničar	28 – 5 May 1997	1.87 m (6 ft 2 in)	Saarlouis Royals	(Germany)
C	10	Teja Goršič	25 – 7 July 1999	1.89 m (6 ft 2 in)	CSM Constanța	(Romania)
SG	13	Zala Friškovec	25 – 10 October 1999	1.80 m (5 ft 11 in)	Sopron Basket	(Hungary)
PF	15	Mojca Jelenc	22 – 4 January 2003	1.97 m (6 ft 6 in)	Valencia Basket	(Spain)
SF	17	Ajša Sivka	19 – 23 November 2005	1.92 m (6 ft 4 in)	Tarbes Gespe Bigorre	(France)
SG	20	Lea Debeljak	23 – 25 October 2001	1.77 m (5 ft 10 in)	Kangoeroes Basket Mechelen	(Belgium)
C	23	Jessica Shepard	28 – 11 September 1996	1.95 m (6 ft 5 in)	Athinaikos	(Greece)
PG	33	Sara Sambolić	21 – 31 May 2004	1.70 m (5 ft 7 in)	KK Ilirija	(Slovenia)
PG	71	Lea Bartelme	19 – 30 December 2005	1.76 m (5 ft 9 in)	UMBC Retrievers	(United States)

Head coach

- (Greece) George Dikeoulakos

Assistant coach(es)

- (Greece) Styliani Kaltsidou

Legend

- (C) Team captain
- Club – describes last
  club before the tournament
- Age – describes age
  on 18 June 2025

== Group C ==
=== Belgium ===
The roster was announced on 13 June 2025.

Belgium women's national basketball team roster
Players
Coaches

Pos.	No.	Name	Age – Date of birth	Height	Club	Ctr.
PG	4	Elise Ramette	26 – 3 November 1998	1.71 m (5 ft 7 in)	Joventut Badalona	(Spain)
PF	5	Nastja Claessens	20 – 2 December 2004	1.84 m (6 ft 0 in)	IDK Euskotren	(Spain)
SF	6	Antonia Delaere	30 – 1 August 1994	1.82 m (6 ft 0 in)	CB Avenida	(Spain)
PF	11	Emma Meesseman (C)	32 – 13 May 1993	1.93 m (6 ft 4 in)	Fenerbahçe	(Turkey)
C	13	Kyara Linskens	28 – 13 November 1996	1.93 m (6 ft 4 in)	Dynamo Kursk	(Russia)
SF	22	Bethy Mununga	27 – 22 July 1997	1.83 m (6 ft 0 in)	Araski AES	(Spain)
C	25	Becky Massey	25 – 21 March 2000	1.86 m (6 ft 1 in)	IDK Euskotren	(Spain)
SF	27	Marie Vervaet	25 – 29 February 2000	1.86 m (6 ft 1 in)	Castors Braine	(Belgium)
SF	31	Maxuella Lisowa-Mbaka	24 – 14 May 2001	1.78 m (5 ft 10 in)	Free agent
PG	35	Julie Vanloo	32 – 10 February 1993	1.73 m (5 ft 8 in)	Galatasaray	(Turkey)
PG	55	Julie Allemand	28 – 7 July 1996	1.74 m (5 ft 9 in)	Fenerbahçe	(Turkey)
C	99	Ine Joris	23 – 25 July 2001	1.83 m (6 ft 0 in)	Navarra Ardoi	(Spain)

Head coach

- (United States) Mike Thibault

Assistant coach(es)

- (Belgium) Pascal Angillis

Legend

- (C) Team captain
- Club – describes last
  club before the tournament
- Age – describes age
  on 18 June 2025

=== Czechia ===
The roster was announced on 12 June 2025.

Czechia women's national basketball roster
Players
Coaches

Pos.	No.	Name	Age – Date of birth	Height	Club	Ctr.
PG	1	Kateřina Zeithammerová	23 – 17 April 2002	1.62 m (5 ft 4 in)	Žabiny Brno	(Czech Republic)
SF	2	Julie Pospíšilová	25 – 20 June 1999	1.83 m (6 ft 0 in)	BLMA	(France)
SG	4	Gabriela Andělová	29 – 21 March 1996	1.73 m (5 ft 8 in)	Baloncesto Leganés	(Spain)
PF	5	Natálie Stoupalová	26 – 13 July 1998	1.85 m (6 ft 1 in)	VBW Gdynia	(Poland)
C	7	Alena Hanušová	34 – 29 May 1991	1.90 m (6 ft 3 in)	DSK Brandýs	(Czech Republic)
SF	8	Veronika Voráčková	25 – 21 June 1999	1.80 m (5 ft 11 in)	Basket Zaragoza	(Spain)
PG	10	Eliška Hamzová	23 – 1 October 2001	1.82 m (6 ft 0 in)	Žabiny Brno	(Czech Republic)
C	11	Anežka Kopecká	25 – 29 March 2000	1.81 m (5 ft 11 in)	KP Brno	(Czech Republic)
SG	12	Tereza Vyoralová (C)	31 – 16 January 1994	1.76 m (5 ft 9 in)	USK Praha	(Czech Republic)
SG	13	Petra Holešínská	28 – 12 March 1997	1.78 m (5 ft 10 in)	Emlak Konut SK	(Turkey)
C	22	Emma Čechová	20 – 12 July 2004	1.95 m (6 ft 5 in)	USK Praha	(Czech Republic)
C	44	Julia Reisingerová	27 – 17 April 1998	1.94 m (6 ft 4 in)	PEAC-Pécs	(Hungary)

Head coach

- (Czech Republic) Romana Ptáčková

Assistant coach(es)

- (Czech Republic) Petr Treml

Legend

- (C) Team captain
- Club – describes last
  club before the tournament
- Age – describes age
  on 18 June 2025

=== Montenegro ===
The roster was announced on 17 June 2025.

Montenegro women's national basketball team roster
Players
Coaches

Pos.	No.	Name	Age – Date of birth	Height	Club	Ctr.
PF	3	Bojana Kovačević	28 – 16 October 1996	1.86 m (6 ft 1 in)	Hapoel Petah Tikva	(Israel)
PG	4	Sofija Živaljević	27 – 24 December 1997	1.76 m (5 ft 9 in)	MBK Ružomberok	(Slovakia)
F	5	Jovana Pašić	33 – 12 May 1992	1.83 m (6 ft 0 in)	Hapoel Kfar Saba	(Israel)
SG	7	Zorana Radonjić	23 – 13 June 2002	1.73 m (5 ft 8 in)	Budućnost Podgorica	(Montenegro)
PG	10	Marija Baošić	20 – 12 October 2004	1.66 m (5 ft 5 in)	Budućnost Podgorica	(Montenegro)
PF	14	Nikolina Ilić	21 – 13 October 2003	1.80 m (5 ft 11 in)	Budućnost Podgorica	(Montenegro)
C	21	Maja Bigović	22 – 24 September 2002	1.95 m (6 ft 5 in)	Budućnost Podgorica	(Montenegro)
SG	23	Jelena Vučetić	31 – 14 September 1993	1.82 m (6 ft 0 in)	BC Castors Braine	(Belgium)
SG	24	Marija Baošić	24 – 5 February 2001	1.80 m (5 ft 11 in)	BG Göttingen	(Germany)
PG	25	Marija Leković	21 – 21 July 2003	1.66 m (5 ft 5 in)	Valencia Basket	(Spain)
F	35	Milica Jovanović (C)	35 – 14 August 1989	1.89 m (6 ft 2 in)	Maccabi Bnot Ashdod	(Israel)
G	88	Jelena Bulajić	18 – 27 February 2007	1.79 m (5 ft 10 in)	South Florida Bulls	(United States)

Head coach

- (Montenegro) Jelena Škerović

Assistant coach(es)

- (Scotland) Alexander Geddes

Legend

- (C) Team captain
- Club – describes last
  club before the tournament
- Age – describes age
  on 18 June 2025

=== Portugal ===
The roster was announced on 15 June 2025.

Portugal women's national basketball team roster
Players
Coaches

Pos.	No.	Name	Age – Date of birth	Height	Club	Ctr.
G	1	Joana Soeiro	30 – 24 January 1995	1.70 m (5 ft 7 in)	CD Zamarat	(Spain)
F	2	Maianca Umabano	28 – 1 May 1997	1.80 m (5 ft 11 in)	GDESSA	(Portugal)
PG	4	Inês Viana	30 – 10 July 1994	1.66 m (5 ft 5 in)	Benfica	(Portugal)
PG	5	Carolina Rodrigues	26 – 25 September 1998	1.69 m (5 ft 7 in)	Elfic Fribourg	(Switzerland)
SF	9	Laura Ferreira	29 – 19 June 1995	1.80 m (5 ft 11 in)	La Tronche-Meylan	(France)
SG	10	Maria Bettencourt	34 – 28 February 1991	1.72 m (5 ft 8 in)	Azul Marino Mallorca	(Spain)
PF	11	Lavínia da Silva	37 – 1 April 1988	1.87 m (6 ft 2 in)	Oaklands Wolves	(England)
SF	13	Josephine Filipe	29 – 11 October 1995	1.78 m (5 ft 10 in)	CB Al-Qazeres	(Spain)
C	14	Sofia da Silva	34 – 30 July 1990	1.90 m (6 ft 3 in)	Azul Marino Mallorca	(Spain)
SF	18	Mariana Silva	26 – 18 May 1999	1.84 m (6 ft 0 in)	Benfica	(Portugal)
SG	31	Márcia da Costa	35 – 13 December 1989	1.74 m (5 ft 9 in)	Castors Braine	(Belgium)
C	99	Carolina Cruz	24 – 17 April 2001	1.92 m (6 ft 4 in)	Galli Basket	(Italy)

Head coach

- (Portugal) Ricardo Vasconcelos

Assistant coach(es)

- (Portugal) José Araújo

Legend

- (C) Team captain
- Club – describes last
  club before the tournament
- Age – describes age
  on 18 June 2025

== Group D ==
=== Germany ===
The roster was announced on 15 June 2025.

Germany women's national basketball team – EuroBasket Women 2025 qualification roster
Players
Coaches

Pos.	No.	Name	Age – Date of birth	Height	Club	Ctr.
PG	1	Alexis Peterson	29 – 20 June 1995	1.65 m (5 ft 5 in)	ESB Villeneuve-d'Ascq	(France)
G	3	Alexandra Wilke	28 – 29 September 1996	1.75 m (5 ft 9 in)	Rutronik Stars Keltern	(Germany)
SF	5	Hilke Feldrappe	21 – 12 April 2004	1.88 m (6 ft 2 in)	Missouri Tigers	(United States)
PG	7	Jennifer Crowder	29 – 10 April 1996	1.64 m (5 ft 5 in)	Limonta Costa Masnaga	(Italy)
SF	9	Emma Eichmeyer	25 – 25 February 2000	1.80 m (5 ft 11 in)	Saarlouis Royals	(Germany)
SG	13	Leonie Fiebich (C)	25 – 10 January 2000	1.92 m (6 ft 4 in)	New York Liberty	(United States)
C	15	Luisa Geiselsöder	25 – 10 February 2000	1.90 m (6 ft 3 in)	Dallas Wings	(United States)
PF	20	Frieda Bühner	21 – 28 May 2004	1.86 m (6 ft 1 in)	CB Estudiantes	(Spain)
SF	22	Emily Bessoir	23 – 19 November 2001	1.92 m (6 ft 4 in)	Gernika KESB	(Spain)
G	25	Clara Bielefeld	17 – 28 August 2007	1.85 m (6 ft 1 in)	TCU Horned Frogs	(United States)
SF	46	Romy Bär	38 – 17 May 1987	1.87 m (6 ft 2 in)	Mitteldeutscher BC	(Germany)
PG	55	Jessika Schiffer	24 – 28 September 2000	1.75 m (5 ft 9 in)	Saarlouis Royals	(Germany)

Head coach

- (Canada) Lisa Thomaidis

Assistant coach(es)

- (Canada) Claire Meadows

Legend

- (C) Team captain
- Club – describes last
  club before the tournament
- Age – describes age
  on 18 June 2025

=== Great Britain ===
A 13-player roster was announced on 5 June 2025. The final roster was revealed on 16 June 2025.

Great Britain women's national basketball team roster
Players
Coaches

Pos.	No.	Name	Age – Date of birth	Height	Club	Ctr.
SG	2	Hannah Jump	24 – 8 January 2001	1.80 m (5 ft 11 in)	Botaş SK	(Turkey)
F	5	Cheridene Green	29 – 19 September 1995	1.90 m (6 ft 3 in)	London Lions	(United Kingdom)
G	7	Holly Winterburn	24 – 1 October 2000	1.80 m (5 ft 11 in)	Beşiktaş JK	(Turkey)
PG	9	Shanice Beckford-Norton	28 – 28 May 1997	1.73 m (5 ft 8 in)	Oaklands Wolves	(United Kingdom)
G	10	Kitty Henderson	22 – 24 August 2002	1.78 m (5 ft 10 in)	Columbia University	(United States)
PF	12	Savannah Wilkinson	26 – 31 October 1998	1.78 m (5 ft 10 in)	Elitzur Holon	(Israel)
C	14	Temi Fagbenle (C)	32 – 8 September 1992	1.93 m (6 ft 4 in)	Golden State Valkyries	(United States)
G	17	Hannah Robb	27 – 28 April 1998	1.75 m (5 ft 9 in)	Caledonia Gladiators	(United Kingdom)
G	20	Shauna Harrison	25 – 26 May 2000	1.80 m (5 ft 11 in)	Sheffield Hatters	(United Kingdom)
PF	25	Kirsty Brown	25 – 26 August 1999	1.90 m (6 ft 3 in)	Caledonia Gladiators	(United Kingdom)
G	30	Sam Ashby	24 – 22 March 2001	1.85 m (6 ft 1 in)	Oaklands Wolves	(United Kingdom)
G	43	Katie Januszewska	21 – 28 May 2004	1.83 m (6 ft 0 in)	Leicester Riders	(United Kingdom)

Head coach

- (Spain) Anna Montañana

Assistant coach(es)

- (Spain) Iñigo Nuñez

Legend

- (C) Team captain
- Club – describes last
  club before the tournament
- Age – describes age
  on 18 June 2025

=== Sweden ===
The roster was announced on 16 June 2025.

Sweden women's national basketball roster
Players
Coaches

Pos.	No.	Name	Age – Date of birth	Height	Club	Ctr.
PF	2	Elin Gustavsson	32 – 18 January 1993	1.87 m (6 ft 2 in)	Zagłębie Sosnowiec	(Poland)
PG	3	Lovisa Hjern	26 – 1 March 1999	1.75 m (5 ft 9 in)	Ślęza Wrocław	(Poland)
PF	4	Nathalie Fontaine	31 – 3 October 1993	1.83 m (6 ft 0 in)	Derthona Basket	(Italy)
SG	6	Frida Eldebrink	37 – 4 January 1988	1.75 m (5 ft 9 in)	Hozono Jairis	(Spain)
PG	7	Klara Lundquist	25 – 28 August 1999	1.73 m (5 ft 8 in)	Uni Girona CB	(Spain)
F	8	Ellen Nyström (C)	31 – 15 September 1993	1.85 m (6 ft 1 in)	Basket Saragossa 2002	(Spain)
G	12	Matilda Ekh	23 – 19 April 2002	1.82 m (6 ft 0 in)	Virginia Tech Hokies	(United States)
C	14	Louice Halvarsson	36 – 15 January 1989	1.91 m (6 ft 3 in)	CD Ibaeta	(Spain)
F	19	Tilda Trygger	19 – 12 February 2006	1.98 m (6 ft 6 in)	NC State Wolfpack	(United States)
C	22	Emma Johansson	21 – 28 August 2003	1.90 m (6 ft 3 in)	California Baptist Lancers	(United States)
C	38	Precious Johnson	25 – 1 March 2000	1.90 m (6 ft 3 in)	Megbízási Szerzödés	(Hungary)
PF	51	Fanny Wadling	28 – 23 May 1997	1.86 m (6 ft 1 in)	Luleå Basket	(Sweden)

Head coach

- (Sweden) Kevin Taylor Lundgren

Assistant coach(es)

- (Sweden) Robin Sandberg

Legend

- (C) Team captain
- Club – describes last
  club before the tournament
- Age – describes age
  on 18 June 2025

=== Spain ===
The roster was announced on 15 June 2025.

Spain women's national basketball team roster
Players
Coaches

Pos.	No.	Name	Age – Date of birth	Height	Club	Ctr.
G	2	Elena Buenavida	21 – 8 March 2004	1.75 m (5 ft 9 in)	Valencia Basket	(Spain)
C	3	Irati Etxarri	26 – 26 July 1998	1.87 m (6 ft 2 in)	CB Estudiantes	(Spain)
PG	4	Mariona Ortiz	33 – 28 February 1992	1.82 m (6 ft 0 in)	Basket Zaragoza	(Spain)
G	6	Aina Ayuso	25 – 1 August 1999	1.76 m (5 ft 9 in)	CB Jairis	(Spain)
SF	7	Alba Torrens	35 – 30 August 1989	1.92 m (6 ft 4 in)	Valencia Basket	(Spain)
PF	8	María Araújo	27 – 1 August 1997	1.82 m (6 ft 0 in)	Valencia Basket	(Spain)
SF	9	Helena Pueyo	24 – 13 February 2001	1.82 m (6 ft 0 in)	Basket Zaragoza	(Spain)
C	11	Awa Fam	19 – 17 June 2006	1.92 m (6 ft 4 in)	Valencia Basket	(Spain)
F	13	Andrea Vilaró	32 – 9 May 1993	1.79 m (5 ft 10 in)	CB Avenida	(Spain)
C	14	Raquel Carrera	23 – 31 October 2001	1.90 m (6 ft 3 in)	Valencia Basket	(Spain)
C	20	Paula Ginzo	27 – 16 February 1998	1.89 m (6 ft 2 in)	Diósgyőri VTK	(Hungary)
PG	44	Iyana Martín	19 – 18 January 2006	1.74 m (5 ft 9 in)	CB Avenida	(Spain)

Head coach

- (Spain) Miguel Méndez

Assistant coach(es)

- (Spain) Nacho Martínez

Legend

- (C) Team captain
- Club – describes last
  club before the tournament
- Age – describes age
  on 18 June 2025
