= Championnat LNB =

Swiss basketball league

- Sport: Basketball
- Founded: 1994
- No. of teams: 16
- Country: Switzerland
- Continent: FIBA Europe (Europe)
- Most recent champion: GC Zurich (2nd title) (2025–26)
- Most titles: Vevey Riviera (4 titles)
- Level on pyramid: 2nd Tier (Switzerland)
- Promotion to: SBL
- Relegation to: NL1
- Domestic cup: Swiss Cup
- Website: www.lnba.ch

Championnat Lige Nationale B (Ligue Nationale B) is the second-tier level professional club basketball league in Switzerland. It is organized by Swiss Basketball.

== Promotion and relegation ==
The professional Swiss Basketball association is divided into two championships, the top-tier level SBL, and the 2nd-tier level LNB, with a system of promotion and relegation between them.

== LNB teams ==
- Allschwil
- Bären Kleinbasel
- Bernex Basket
- Boncourt
- CNBS
- GC Zürich
- Goldcoast Wallabies
- Groupe E Academie Fribourg U23
- Lions de Genève U23
- Lugano Tigers U23
- Meyrin Basket
- Morges-Saint-Prex Red Devils
- Swiss Central Basket
- Union Lavaux Riviera
- Villars Basket
- Winterthur

== Champions ==
Season	Champions
2025–26	GC Zurich (2)
2024–25	Bären Kleinbasel
2023–24	GC Zurich
2022–23	Pully Basket
2021–22	Vevey Riviera (4)
2020–21	Goldcoast Wallabies
2019–20	No champion due to the coronavirus pandemic
2018–19	BBC Nyon
2017–18	Villars Basket
2016–17	Vevey Riviera (3)
2015–16	Lausanne (2)
2014–15	BC Alte Kanti Aarau
2013-14	Lausanne
2012-13	BC Alte Kanti Aarau
2011-12	BC Alte Kanti Aarau
2010-11	Colas Bernex Basket
2009-10	Poly-Rapid Zürich Wildcats
2008-09	Martigny-Rhône Basket
2007-08	SAM Massagno
2006-07	SAV Vacallo (3)
2005-06	Vevey Riviera (2)
2004-05	SAV Vacallo
2003-04	Hérens Basket
2002-03	Union Neuchâtel
2001-02	Morges Basket
2000-01	Carouge Basket
1999-00	Chêne Basket
1998-99	Renens Basket
1997-98	BCK KZO Wetzikon
1996-97	Blonay Basket
1995-96	Genève Basket
1994-95	SAV Vacallo
