= Swiss Cup (basketball) =

Basketball cup in Switzerland

- Founded: 1932; 94 years ago
- No. of teams: 54
- Country: Switzerland
- Confederation: FIBA Europe
- Related competitions: Swiss Basketball League; SB League Women; SBL Cup; NLB Women
- Website: swissbasketball.ch/swiss-cup/

The Swiss Basketball Cup, commonly known as simply the Swiss Cup or as the Patrick Baumann Swiss Cup, is the national cup competition of professional basketball in Switzerland. It is organised by Swiss Basketball, the national governing body of the sport. Swiss Basketball hosts a men's, women's, U18 men's, and U18 women's version of the Patrick Baumann Swiss Cup.

== Format ==
Teams from the top-tier levels in Switzerland can participate in the cup competition. A total number of 54 teams play a knock-out tournament, with a final at a neutral venue to determine the cup champions.

== Men's Finals ==
Year	Host city	Winners	Runners-up	Score
2025	Müri	Geneva Lions	Union Neuchâtel Basket	72-65
2024	Fribourg	Fribourg Olympic	Geneva Lions	57-48
2023	Fribourg	Fribourg Olympic	Spinelli Massagno	86-76
2022	Fribourg	Fribourg Olympic	BBC Nyon	73–48
2021	Fribourg	Lions de Genève	Fribourg Olympic	85–82
2020	Canceled due to the COVID-19 pandemic			
2019	Biel	Fribourg Olympic	Lions de Genève	82–73
2018	Geneva	Fribourg Olympic	Lugano Tigers	92–72
2017	Geneva	Lions de Genève	Monthey	78–77
2016	Zürich	Fribourg Olympic	Lions de Genève	82–75
2015	Fribourg	Lugano Tigers	Union Neuchâtel	79–61
2014	Fribourg	Lions de Genève	Fribourg Olympic	73–59
2013	Fribourg	Union Neuchâtel	SAM Massagno	89–85
2012	Fribourg	Lugano Tigers	Monthey	76–74
2011	Fribourg	Lugano Tigers	Monthey	68–67
2010	Fribourg	Birstal Starwings	SAV Vacallo	91–83
2009	Fribourg	SAV Vacallo	Geneva Devils	73–67
2008	Fribourg	SAV Vacallo	Lugano Tigers	76–65
2007	Fribourg	Fribourg Olympic	Monthey	70–55
2006	Fribourg	Monthey	Lugano Tigers	73–64
2005	Fribourg	Boncourt	Nyon	101–61
2004	Fribourg	Geneva Devils	Monthey	76–72
2003	Fribourg	Monthey	Boncourt	84–76
2002	Fribourg	Lugano Tigers	Boncourt	88–75
2001	Fribourg	Lugano Tigers	Riviera	90–80
2000	Fribourg	SAV Vacallo	Genève Versoix	85–53
1999	Fribourg	SAV Vacallo	Lugano Tigers	85–65
1998	Berne	Fribourg Olympic	Genève Versoix	78–73
1997	Morges	Fribourg Olympic	Pully	78–68
1996	Zürich	Bellinzone	Vevey	85–84
1995	Zürich	Bellinzone	Union Neuchâtel	93–55
1994	Fribourg	Bellinzone	Vevey	72–67
1993	Fribourg	Bellinzone	Fribourg Olympic	88–66
1992	Genève	Pully	SAM Massagno	109–82
1991	Genève	Pully	Chêne	119–98
1990	Genève	Pully	Champel	97–91
1989	Genève	Pully	Champel	97–91
1988	Genève	Pully	SF Lausanne	82–80
1987	Genève	Champel	Vevey	80–75
1986	Genève	Champel	Pully	97–91
1985	Genève	Vevey	Fribourg Olympic	87–82
1984	Genève	Vevey	Lugano	75–70
1983	Genève	Vevey	Fribourg Olympic	58–63
1982	Monthey	FV Lugano	BBC Nyon	100–92
1981	Genève	Nyon Basket	Vevey	96–95
1980	Bienne	Viganello	Fribourg Olympic	90–86
1979	Bellinzone	Lugano Molino Nuovo	SF Lausanne	106–92
1978	Reussbühl	Fribourg Olympic	Federale Lugano	76–73
1977	Mezzovico	Viganello	Pregassona	107–103
1976	Monthey	Fribourg Olympic	Pregassona	92–88
1975	Renens	Federale Lugano	Fribourg Olympic	89–73
1974	Lugano	Federale Lugano	Lugano Molino Nuovo (LNB)	103–84
1973	Neuchâtel	Pregassona (LNB)	Stade Français Genève	88–84
1972	Neuchâtel	Stade Français Genève	Neuchâtel (LNB)	85–59
1971	Neuchâtel	Stade Français Genève	Fribourg Olympic	78–76
1970	Birsfelden	Stade Français Genève	Federale Lugano	83–49
1969	Lugano	Birsfelden	Federale Lugano	60–55
1968	Unknown	Stade Français Genève	Birsfelden	96–62
1967	Fribourg	Fribourg Olympic	Urania Genève	61–55
1966	La Chaux-de-Fonds	Stade Français Genève	Fribourg Ol.	53–51
1965	Genève	Urania Genève	Fribourg Olympic	65–59
1964	Lausanne	Olympic La Chaux-de-Fonds	Federale Lugano	50–34
1963	La Chaux-de-Fonds	Sanas Merry Boys Lausanne	Federale Lugano	73–51
1958	Geneva	Federale Lugano	Stade Français Genève	38–35
1942	Geneva	Urania Genève	Geneva Basketball	25-17

== Women's Finals ==
Year	Host city	Winners	Runners-up	Score
2025	Müri	Nyon Basket Féminin	BCF Elfic Fribourg	78-72
2024	Fribourg	BCF Elfic Fribourg	Portes du Soleil BBC Troistorrents	78-61
2023	Fribourg	BCF Elfic Fribourg	Esperance Sportive Pully	93-43
2022	Fribourg	BCF Elfic Fribourg	Portes du Soleil BBC Troistorrents	74-45
2021	Fribourg	BCF Elfic Fribourg	Genève Elite Basket	94-51
2020	Canceled due to the COVID-19 pandemic			
2019	Biel	BC Winterthur	BCF Elfic Fribourg	58-56
2018	Genève	BCF Elfic Fribourg	Juice Bellinzona	76-66
2017	Genève	BC Winterthur	BCF Elfic Fribourg	61-59
2016	Zürich	Fizzy Riva Muraltese	BCF Elfic Fribourg	63-62
2015	Fribourg	Helios VS Basket	BCF Elfic Fribourg	68-63
2014	Fribourg	Helios VS Basket	Descartes Meubles Martigny Basket	66-42
2013	Fribourg	Helios VS Basket	Ovronnaz-Martigny Basket	75-48
2012	Fribourg	Sdent Helios VS Basket	Riva Basket	64-54
2011	Fribourg	Sdent Helios VS Basket	BCF Elfic Fribourg	82-70
2010	Fribourg	Sdent Sierre Basket	BCF Elfic Fribourg	67-38
2009	Fribourg	Université BC Neuchâtel	Giroud Vins BBC Troistorrents	82-62
2008	Fribourg	Université BC Neuchâtel	BBC Giroud Vins Troistorrents	93-80
2007	Fribourg	Sierre Basket	BBC Troistorrents	68-61
2006	Fribourg	Brunnen Basket	Fribourg	66-62
2005	Fribourg	Martigny-Ovronnaz Basket	Pully	86-63
2004	Fribourg	BBC Troistorrents-Morgins	Riva Basket	69-61
2003	Fribourg	BBC Troistorrents-Morgins	Star Gordola	73-54
2002	Fribourg	City Fribourg	BBC Troistorrents	71-64
2001	Fribourg	Martigny Basket	Lausanne Ol.	68-61
2000	Fribourg	Martigny Basket	Bellinzona	76-65
1999	Fribourg	Martigny Basket	Sursee	70-66
1998	Berne	Bellinzone	BBC Troistorrents	75-56
1997	Morges	Bellinzone	BBC Troistorrents	56-48
1996	Zürich	Wetzikon	Bellinzone	73-63
1995	Zürich	Bellinzone	Baden	77-61
1994	Fribourg	Bellinzone	Baden	65-61
1993	Fribourg	Bellinzone	City Fribourg	77-63
1992	Genève	Bellinzone	City Fribourg	78-56
1991	Genève	Femina Lausanne	Nyon	75-66
1990	Genève	Femina Lausanne	Nyon	74-64
1989	Genève	City Fribourg	CVJM Birsfelden	60-50
1988	Genève	CVJM Birsfelden	Nyon	70-69
1987	Genève	Fémina Berne	ES Pully	82-75
1986	Genève	ES Pully	Fémina Berne	98-84
1985	Genève	ES Pully	Fémina Berne	69-60
1984	Genève	Nyon	Espérance Sportive Pully	62-58
1983	Genève	CVJM Birsfelden	Nyon	53-48
1982	Bellinzone	STV Lucerne	Muraltese	60-55
1981	Genève	CVJM Birsfelden	Versoix	77-40
1980	Unknown	Fémina Berne	Baden	74-58
1979	Nyon	Nyon	Stade Français	63-62
1978	Pully	Nyon	Fémina Berne	73-49
1977	Renens	Berner	Nyon	68-72
1976	Genève	Stade Français	Plainpalais Genève	65-56
1975	Fribourg	Berner	Nyon	64-51
1972	Unknown	Stade Français	Servette	64-48
1971	Genève	Stade Français	Riri Mendrisio	53-36
1969	Genève	Riri Mendrisio	Servette	37-31
1968	Genève	Riri Mendrisio	Stade Français	69-27

== See also ==
- Swiss Basketball League (SBL)
- Swiss Basketball League Cup (League Cup)
