= Michaela Moua =

Finnish basketball player

Michaela Moua (born 18 August 1976 in Helsinki) is a Finnish former basketball player.

Born of Finnish mother and Ivorian father Moua started her career in the Finnish women's basketball league at the age of 16. In 1996 she joined the Ohio State Buckeyes being the first foreign female basketball player in the Ohio State University. After four seasons of college basketball Moua returned to Europe and played for several clubs in France, Switzerland, Croatia, Italy and Finland. She capped 124 times for the Finland women's national basketball team. She was nominated in 2021 "coordinator for anti-racism" of the European Commission.

== Ohio State statistics ==
Legend
GP	Games played	GS	Games started	MPG	Minutes per game
FG%	Field goal percentage	3P%	3-point field goal percentage	FT%	Free throw percentage
RPG	Rebounds per game	APG	Assists per game	SPG	Steals per game
BPG	Blocks per game	PPG	Points per game	**Bold**	Career high

Year	Team	GP	Points	FG%	3P%	FT%	RPG	APG	SPG	BPG	PPG
1996-97	Ohio State	28	250	37.3%	**29.5%**	**75.0%**	3.1	**3.0**	**1.1**	0.1	8.9
1997-98	Ohio State	27	157	45.9%	26.7%	74.5%	2.4	0.9	0.4	0.0	5.8
1998-99	Ohio State	**29**	**261**	55.4%	0.0%	61.0%	**4.5**	1.1	1.0	**0.2**	**9.0**
1999-00	Ohio State	25	212	**57.3%**	0.0%	58.8%	3.7	0.8	1.0	-	8.5
Career		109	880	48.1%	28.6%	66.7%	3.5	1.5	0.9	0.1	8.1

== Career ==
- (Finland) Pussihukat (1992–1996)
- (United States) Ohio State Buckeyes (1996–2000)
- (France) ESB Villeneuve-d'Ascq (2000–2002)
- (Italy) Acer Priolo (2002–2003)
- (Switzerland) Martigny Basket (2003–2005)
- (Hungary) Zala Volán (2005–2006)
- (Croatia) Gospić Osiguranje (2006–2007)
- (Italy) Juventus Pontedera (2007–2008)
- (Switzerland) Universite BC Neuchatel (2008–2009)
- (Finland) Espoo Basket Team (2009–2010)
- (Finland) Keravan Energia Team (2009–2011)
- (Finland) Forssan Alku (2010–2011)

== Honors ==
- Swiss Championship: 2004, 2005
