= NLB Women =

Swiss basketball league

- Sport: Basketball
- No. of teams: 10
- Country: Switzerland
- Continent: FIBA Europe (Europe)
- Level on pyramid: 2nd Tier (Switzerland)
- Promotion to: SB League Women
- Relegation to: NL1 Women
- Website: swiss.basketball/national-competitions/nlb/women

NLB Women is the second-tier level professional club basketball league in Switzerland for women's professional basketball. It is organized by Swiss Basketball.

== Teams ==
The following teams participate in NLB Women as of the 2024–25 season:

- BC Winterthur
- Elfic Fribourg Generation
- Blonay Basket
- Villars Basket
- BC Arlesheim
- Pallacanestro Bellinzona
- Sion Basket
- Muraltese Basket
- Lions de Genève
- Lausanne Ville-Prilly Basket

== Champions ==
Season	Champion
1994–95	SP Star Gordola
1995–96	Espérance Sportive Pully
1996–97	Carouge Basket
1997–98	BCTV Sursee
1998–99	Fémina Lausanne
1999–00	SP Star Gordola
2000–01	City Fribourg BBC
2001–02	Carouge Basket
2002–03	Hélios Basket
2003–04	Lancy Meyrin Basket
2004–05	Brunnen Basket
2005–06	Sierre Basket
2006–07	Lancy Meyrin Basket
2007–08	Sierre Basket
2008–09	Brunnen Basket (LNB Promotion)/Nyon Basket Féminin II (LNB)
2009–10	SC Uni Basel Basket (LNB Promotion)/Martigny-Rhône Basket (LNB)
2010–11	Ovronnaz-Martigny Basket (LNB Promotion)/Lancy Basket (LNB)
2011–12	Sopraceneri Bellinzona
2012–13	Elfic Fribourg Génération
2013–14	Luzern Amazons Highflyers
2014–15	BC Alte Kanti Aarau
2015–16	Portes du Soleil BBC Troistorrents
2016–17	Elfic Fribourg Génération
2017–18	Nyon Basket Féminin
2018–19	Nyon Basket Féminin
2019–20	No title awarded due to pandemic.
2020–21	Hélios VS Basket Espoirs
2021–22	BC Winterthur
2022–23	Riva Basket
2023–24	Blonay Basket
2024–25	Blonay Basket
