= Naomi Davenport =

American basketball player (born 1997)

Baden Basket 54
- Position: Guard
- League: Swiss League Women

Personal information
- Born: June 19, 1997 (age 29) Cincinnati, Ohio
- Listed height: 5 ft 11 in (1.80 m)

Career information
- High school: Mount Notre Dame High School
- College: Trinity Valley CC (2015-2017); West Virginia (2017–2019)
- WNBA draft: 2019: undrafted
- Playing career: 2019–present

Career history
- 2019-2020: Gigantes de Carolina
- 2020-2021: Katarzynki Torun
- 2021-2022: Peli-Karhut
- 2022: Phoenix Stiinta Constanta
- 2023: Aulnoye
- 2023: Explosivos de Moca
- 2024: Eigner Angels Noerdlingen
- 2024: Vimpelin Veto
- 2024: Rojas de Veracruz
- 2025: Pollitas de Isabela
- 2025-2026: Sparta Bertrange
- 2025-2026: Baden Basket 54

Career highlights
- All-Big 12 First Team (2019); All-Big 12 Second Team (2018)

Naomi Davenport (born June 19, 1997) is a professional basketball player for Baden Basket 54 of the Swiss League Women. Davenport previously played for Trinity Valley Cardinals and the West Virginia Mountaineers.

== High school career ==
Davenport was considered a four star recruit in the 2015 class. She was ranked the 76th overall. Davenport was originally committed to the University of Michigan. On November 12, 2024, Davenport signed her letter of intent (LOI) with the Michigan Wolverines.

During her senior year, Davenport averaged 17.4 points, 8.5 rebounds, and 3.5 assists per game. She helped her team to a 24-3 record. Davenport was a McDonald's All-American Game nominee. She was named to the Associated Press All-Ohio Third team in 2015. She was a two-time Girls Greater Catholic League (GGCL) player of the year (2014, 2015). She was a three-time All-GGCL First Team selection.

== College career ==
=== Trinity Valley Community College ===
After finishing high school, Davenport never attended the University of Michigan. She instead chose to attend Trinity Valley Community College in Texas. During her first year with the Cardinals, Davenport averaged 14.3 points, 5.6 rebounds, and 2.2 assists per game. She was named National Junior College Athletic Association (NJCAA) All-America Second Team, Women's Basketball Coaches Association (WBCA) All-America First Team. The Cardinals finished 31-4 and runners-up in the NJCAA Division 1 Tournament.

As a sophomore, Davenport averaged 16.3 points, 5.7 rebounds, and 2.6 assists per game. She was named unanimous First Team All-American by the NCJAA and the WBCA. The Cardinals finished runners-up in the NJCAA Division 1 Tournament for the second straight year. On May 8, 2017, it was announced that Davenport would attend the University of West Virginia for the 2017-18 season.

=== West Virginia ===
As a junior, Davenport averaged 16.1 points, 7.1 rebounds, and 2.4 rebounds. She played a Big 12 Conference leading 37 games. She had six double doubles and scored 20 or more points in 10 games. Davenport was named Second Team All-Big 12.

During her senior season, Davenport averaged 15.7 points, 8.1 rebounds, and 2.6 assists. Davenport was an All-Big 12 First Team selection.

== Professional career ==
Following her college career, Davenport was considered to be a second round pick. However, she went undrafted in the 2019 WNBA Draft, making her an unrestricted free agent.

Following the draft, Davenport signed with Gigantes de Carolina in Puerto Rico.

Davenport currently plays for Baden Basket 54.
