= Maria Villarroel =

Venezuelan basketball player (born 1978)

Ofelia María Villarroel Caraballo
Personal information
- Born: December 3, 1978 (age 47) Porlamar, Nueva Esparta, Venezuela
- Listed height: 5 ft 8 in (1.73 m)
- Listed weight: 135 lb (61 kg)

Career information
- College: Oklahoma (2002–2004)
- WNBA draft: 2004: 3rd round, 27th overall pick
- Drafted by: Phoenix Mercury (traded to Houston Comets)
- Playing career: 2004–present
- Position: Guard

Career history
- 2005–2010: Sierre Basket
- 2010-2012: Hélios VS Basket
- 2010: Barcelona Guayaquil
- 2012: BCF Elfic Fribourg
- 2016: Hélios VS Basket

Career highlights
- NJCAA Consensus All-American (2001, 2002); Big-12 All-Tournament Team (2004)
- Stats at Basketball Reference

Ofelia María Villarroel Caraballo (born December 3, 1978) is a former Venezuelan basketball player. She was drafted in the 2004 WNBA draft after a decorated U.S. college career with the University of Oklahoma and in Europe playing in the Swiss Women's Basketball Championship for over a decade.

Villarroel is considered the best women's basketball player ever from the South American country, and holds several accolades and records. She is still the only Venezuelan to be selected to an NCAA D-1 Conference All-Tournament squad, the first one to be drafted into the WNBA, and the first player to play in the EuroCup.

== College career ==
Villarroel arrived stateside at the age of 21 on a basketball scholarship with help of Jesús Cordovez, a nationally acclaimed basketball coach in Venezuela. At Independence Community College, she immediately gained national recognition averaging 22.1 PPG and was named consensus NJCAA All-American and Conference Player of the Year.

For her sophomore season, Villarroel transferred to NEO and improved her PPG average to 24.4 while shooting a remarkable 73% from the field. Again, she made the NJCAA All-America selection and twice named Conference Player of the Year. A heavily touted recruit out of the JUCO ranks, she committed to play for head coach Sherri Coale and the Oklahoma Sooners.

During her senior year, Villarroel alongside Dionnah Jackson led the sixth seeded Sooners into an upset of the first seeded Texas Longhorns to win the 2004 Big 12 Conference women's basketball tournament for the second time in history. Villarroel averaged 14.3 points per game in her senior year and 14.6 PPG during her two years at Norman. She was named to the Big-12 All-Tournament First Team

== WNBA ==
Villarroel got selected 27th overall by the Phoenix Mercury – and then traded to the now-defunct Houston Comets –, who had the first pick in this Draft and selected Diana Taurasi, now considered to be one of the best female basketball players in history. The native of Venezuela played on several preseason games but was cut through training camp, and decided to turn pro in Europe.

== Pro career ==
The Venezuelan guard was a stalwart playing in Switzerland for three teams. With Sdent Sierre Basket, Villarroel had success and was the team's leader for several seasons, including their 2008 EuroCup stint, where Villarroel was first of her squad in PPG with 19.3 points

She amassed three Swiss championships, three league cups and three Swiss cups during her eight-year career in the SB League Women.

== College statistics ==
Legend
GP	Games played	GS	Games started	MPG	Minutes per game
FG%	Field goal percentage	3P%	3-point field goal percentage	FT%	Free throw percentage
RPG	Rebounds per game	APG	Assists per game	SPG	Steals per game
BPG	Blocks per game	PPG	Points per game	**Bold**	Career high

Year	Team	GP	Points	FG%	3P%	FT%	RPG	APG	SPG	BPG	PPG
2000-01	Independence Community College										22.1
2001-02	Northeastern Oklahoma A&M			**73.4**	**44.6**						**24.4**
2002-03	Oklahoma	32	**480**	**57.6**	27.0	71.0	5.0	**1.9**	**1.79**	**0.65**	**15.0**
2003-04	Oklahoma	**33**	472	52.7	**34.6**	**76.1**	**6.3**	1.6	1.5	0.5	14.3
Career	Oklahoma	65	952	55.0	31.4	73.4	5.7	1.7	1.6	0.6	14.6
