= Brittanny Dinkins =

American professional basketball player

Njarðvík
- Position: Guard
- League: Úrvalsdeild kvenna

Personal information
- Born: March 8, 1994 (age 32) Miami, Florida, U.S.
- Listed height: 170 cm (5 ft 7 in)

Career information
- High school: Miami Norland (Miami, Florida)
- College: Southern Mississippi (2013–2017)
- WNBA draft: 2017: undrafted
- Playing career: 2017–present

Career history
- 2017–2019: Keflavík
- 2019: Colegio Los Leones Quilpe
- 2019: Rutronik Stars Keltern
- 2020: Durán Maquinaria Ensino
- 2020–2021: Hélios VS Basket
- 2021–2022: Misr Insurance
- 2022: Al Zamalek Cairo
- 2022: Orthodox Amman
- 2023: Fjölnir
- 2024–present: Njarðvík

Career highlights
- Chilean League champion (2019); Icelandic champion (2026); 2× Icelandic Basketball Cup (2018, 2025); 4× Icelandic Super Cup (2017, 2018, 2025, 2026); 2× Icelandic Cup MVP (2018, 2025); 3× Úrvalsdeild Foreign Player of the Year (2019, 2025, 2026); Conference USA All-Tournament Team (2017); Conference USA Defensive Player of the Year (2017); Úrvalsdeild kvenna scoring leader (2019); Úrvalsdeild kvenna assist leader (2018)

Brittanny Dinkins (born March 8, 1994, in Miami, Florida) is an American professional basketball player. She played college basketball for Southern Mississippi where she was named the Conference USA Defensive Player of the Year and to the All-Tournament Team in 2017. Following her college career, she went on to play professionally in Iceland where she was named the Icelandic Cup MVP in 2018 and the Úrvalsdeild Foreign Player of the Year in 2019. The same year, she won the Chilean League championship with Colegio Los Leones Quilpe. She was again named the Úrvalsdeild Foreign Player of the Year in 2025 and 2026.

== College career ==
Dinkins played college basketball for Southern Mississippi from 2013 to 2017. She was named the Conference USA defensive player of the year and to the All-Tournament Team in 2017. Dinkins left as the schools all-time leader in games, with 134 games, and the tenth all-time scorer, with 1,479 points.

== Club career ==
Dinkins declared for the 2017 WNBA draft but was not selected. In July 2017, she signed with reigning Icelandic champions Keflavík. In her first game with Keflavík, Dinkins scored 16 points and helped Keflavík win the Icelandic Super Cup. On January 13, 2018, Dinkins won the Icelandic Basketball Cup with Keflavík after beating Njarðvík in the Cup finals. In the game she had 16 points, 11 rebounds, 8 assists and 5 steals, and was named the Cup Final MVP.

In May 2018, she re-signed with Keflavík for the 2018–19 season. On 30 September 2018, she won the Super Cup for the second straight year after Keflavík defeated Haukar 83–77. On October 31, Dinkins scored a career high 51 points against Breiðablik in the Úrvalsdeild, including Keflavík's last 14 points in the 85–78 victory. On December 6, she posted a triple-double, her first of the season, in a victory against Haukar with 34 points, 10 rebounds and 11 assists. In 28 regular season games, she averaged a league leading 28.8 points per game while also contributing 11.8 rebounds and 6.8 assists per contest. She helped lead Keflavík to the Úrvalsdeild finals in 2019 where the team lost to Valur. After the season she was named the Úrvalsdeild Foreign Player of the Year.

In 2019, she played for Colegio Los Leones Quilpe in the Chilean Liga Femenina where she averaged 26.3 points, 7.0 rebounds and 5.1 assists per game, helping the team to the Chilean League championship. After starting the 2019–20 season with Rutronik Stars Keltern in the Damen-Basketball-Bundesliga, she signed with Durán Maquinaria Ensino in the Spanish top-tier Liga Femenina in end of December 2019.

In July 2020, Dinkins signed with Hélios VS Basket of the SB League. She was the league's fifth best scorer, 21.2 points along with 5.2 rebounds, 4.7 assists and 2.5 steals in 26 games. She helped the club to the Swiss Cup final and to the league semifinals.

In June 2021, Dinkins signed with Misr Insurance of the Egyptian Superleague.

In May 2022, she signed with Al Zamalek Cairo of the Egyptian Superleague. In September 2022, she signed with Jordanian club Orthodox Amman to play with the club in the play Arab Club Championships in Tunisia the same month.

In January 2023, Dinkins returned to Iceland and signed with Fjölnir. On 19 February, she scored 46 points in a loss against Valur. In 11 games, she averaged 23.5 points, 8.0 rebounds and 6.1 assists per game.

In July 2024, Dinkins signed with Úrvalsdeild club Njarðvík. On 22 January 2024, she posted 48 points, 11 rebounds and 11 assists in a win against Stjarnan. On 22 March 2025, she won the Icelandic Cup for the second time after Njarðvík beat Grindavík in the Cup finals. She was named the Cup finals MVP after posting a triple double with 31 points, 10 rebounds and 10 assists. After the regular season, she was named the Úrvalsdeild Foreign Player of the Year for the second time.

She returned to Njarðvík the following season and on 27 September 2025, she won the Icelandic Super Cup with the team.

On 17 May 2026, she won the Icelandic championship for the first time.

On 26 september 2026, she won her fourth Super Cup after Njarðvík defeated Keflavík, 83-78, in the Super Cup final.

== National team career ==
Dinkins was given a Cambodian citizenship in 2023, along with several other American basketball players, to compete for the Cambodia national team during the 32nd Southeast Asian Games.
