= 2008–09 EuroCup Women =

- League: EuroCup Women
- Sport: Basketball

Regular season

Final
- Champions: (Turkey) Galatasaray SK
- Runners-up: (Italy) Cras Basket Taranto

EuroCup Women seasons
- ← 2007–08 2009–10 →

The EuroCup Women is an international basketball club competition for women's clubs throughout Europe. The 2008–09 season involved 58 competing teams from 28 countries. The Turkish team Galatasaray SK became the champion, defeating Cras Basket Taranto in the finals. Trailing by 12 points after the first leg in Italy, Galatasaray returned to Istanbul and won 82-61 for a 137-128 victory on aggregate.

== Groups ==
=== Group A ===
Home		Away	Score
AZS PWSZ Gorzów Wielkopolski (Poland)	-	(Slovakia) MBK Ružomberok	82 - 76
Dynamo Moscow (Russia)	-	(Romania) Municipal Târgoviste	95 - 59
MBK Ružomberok (Slovakia)	-	(Russia) Dynamo Moscow	44 - 104
Municipal Târgoviste (Romania)	-	(Poland) AZS PWSZ Gorzów Wielkopolski	70 - 67
AZS PWSZ Gorzów Wielkopolski (Poland)	-	(Russia) Dynamo Moscow	64 - 93
Municipal Târgoviste (Romania)	-	(Slovakia) MBK Ružomberok	73 - 53
MBK Ružomberok (Slovakia)	-	(Poland) AZS PWSZ Gorzów Wielkopolski	91 - 81
Municipal Târgoviste (Romania)	-	(Russia) Dynamo Moscow	50 - 58
Dynamo Moscow (Russia)	-	(Slovakia) MBK Ružomberok	88 - 41
AZS PWSZ Gorzów Wielkopolski (Poland)	-	(Romania) Municipal Târgoviste	77 - 74
MBK Ružomberok (Slovakia)	-	(Romania) Municipal Târgoviste	75 - 69
Dynamo Moscow (Russia)	-	(Poland) AZS PWSZ Gorzów Wielkopolski	88 - 58

Group A

	Team	Pld	W	L	PF	PA	Points
1.	(Russia) Dynamo Moscow	6	6	0	523	316	12
2.	(Romania) Municipal MCM Târgovişte	6	2	4	395	425	8
3.	(Poland) AZS PWSZ Gorzów Wielkopolski	6	2	4	429	489	8
4.	(Slovakia) MBK Ružomberok	6	2	4	380	497	8

=== Group B ===
Home		Away	Score
Dynamo Kursk (Russia)	-	(Romania) CSS-LMK Sfântu Gheorghe	88 - 74
Bnot Hasharon (Israel)	-	(France) Challes-les-Eaux Basket	69 - 81
CSS-LMK Sfântu Gheorghe (Romania)	-	(Israel) Bnot Hasharon	83 - 73
Challes-les-Eaux Basket (France)	-	(Russia) Dynamo Kursk	73 - 68
CSS-LMK Sfântu Gheorghe (Romania)	-	(France) Challes-les-Eaux Basket	59 - 65
Bnot Hasharon (Israel)	-	(Russia) Dynamo Kursk	63 - 102
CSS-LMK Sfântu Gheorghe (Romania)	-	(Russia) Dynamo Kursk	70 - 64
Challes-les-Eaux Basket (France)	-	(Israel) Bnot Hasharon	66 - 72
Dynamo Kursk (Russia)	-	(France) Challes-les-Eaux Basket	69 - 54
Bnot Hasharon (Israel)	-	(Romania) CSS-LMK Sfântu Gheorghe	81 - 91
Challes-les-Eaux Basket (France)	-	(Romania) CSS-LMK Sfântu Gheorghe	77 - 63
Dynamo Kursk (Russia)	-	(Israel) Bnot Hasharon	77 - 50

Group B

	Team	Pld	W	L	PF	PA	Points
1.	(Russia) Dynamo Kursk	6	4	2	468	384	10
2.	(France) Challes-les-Eaux Basket	6	4	2	416	400	10
3.	(Romania) LMK BC Sepsi Sfântu Gheorghe	6	3	3	440	448	9
4.	(Israel) Bnot Hasharon	6	1	5	408	500	7

=== Group C ===
Home		Away	Score
Rivas Ecopolis Madrid (Spain)	-	(Serbia) Crvena Zvezda Belgrade	84 - 57
Dunav Rousse (Bulgaria)	-	(Israel) Elitzur Ramla	73 - 89
Elitzur Ramla (Israel)	-	(Spain) Rivas Ecopolis Madrid	74 - 72
Crvena Zvezda Belgrade (Serbia)	-	(Bulgaria) Dunav Rousse	70 - 52
Dunav Rousse (Bulgaria)	-	(Spain) Rivas Ecopolis Madrid	70 - 75
Crvena Zvezda Belgrade (Serbia)	-	(Israel) Elitzur Ramla	62 - 65
Elitzur Ramla (Israel)	-	(Bulgaria) Dunav Rousse	80 - 70
Crvena Zvezda Belgrade (Serbia)	-	(Spain) Rivas Ecopolis Madrid	51 - 80
Rivas Ecopolis Madrid (Spain)	-	(Israel) Elitzur Ramla	61 - 73
Dunav Rousse (Bulgaria)	-	(Serbia) Crvena Zvezda Belgrade	56 - 44
Rivas Ecopolis Madrid (Spain)	-	(Bulgaria) Dunav Rousse	85 - 71
Elitzur Ramla (Israel)	-	(Serbia) Crvena Zvezda Belgrade	76 - 54

Group C

	Team	Pld	W	L	PF	PA	Points
1.	(Israel) Elitzur Ramla	6	6	0	457	392	12
2.	(Spain) Rivas Ecopolis Madrid	6	4	2	457	396	10
3.	(Serbia) Crvena Zvezda Belgrade	6	1	5	338	413	7
4.	(Bulgaria) Dunav Rousse	6	1	5	392	443	7

=== Group D ===
Home		Away	Score
Szeviép Szeged (Hungary)	-	(Switzerland) Universite BC Neuchatel	79 - 51
Solna Vikings (Sweden)	-	(Hungary) SEAT Foton Gyõr	75 - 71
Université BC Neuchâtel (Switzerland)	-	(Sweden) Solna Vikings	68 - 66
SEAT Foton Gyõr (Hungary)	-	(Hungary) Szeviép Szeged	58 - 78
Solna Vikings (Sweden)	-	(Hungary) Szeviép Szeged	71 - 89
Université BC Neuchâtel (Switzerland)	-	(Hungary) SEAT Foton Gyõr	74 - 68
SEAT Foton Gyõr (Hungary)	-	(Sweden) Solna Vikings	74 - 62
Université BC Neuchâtel (Switzerland)	-	(Hungary) Szeviép Szeged	52 - 74
Szeviép Szeged (Hungary)	-	(Hungary) SEAT Foton Gyõr	70 - 66
Solna Vikings (Sweden)	-	(Switzerland) Université BC Neuchâtel	75 - 73
SEAT Foton Gyõr (Hungary)	-	(Switzerland) Université BC Neuchâtel	71 - 84
Szeviép Szeged (Hungary)	-	(Sweden) Solna Vikings	98 - 82

Group D

	Team	Pld	W	L	PF	PA	Points
1.	(Hungary) Szeviép Szeged	6	6	0	488	380	12
2.	(Switzerland) Université BC Neuchâtel	6	3	3	402	433	9
3.	(Sweden) Solna Vikings	6	2	4	431	473	8
4.	(Hungary) SEAT Foton Gyõr	6	1	5	408	443	7

=== Group E ===
Home		Away	Score
Panionios G.S.S. (Greece)	-	(Greece) Athinaikos BC	59 - 62
Ragusa Dubrovnik (Croatia)	-	(Spain) CB Feve San Jose	51 - 71
Athinaikos BC (Greece)	-	(Croatia) Ragusa Dubrovnik	84 - 59
CB Feve San Jose (Spain)	-	(Greece) Panionios G.S.S.	70 - 57
Ragusa Dubrovnik (Croatia)	-	(Greece) Panionios G.S.S.	62 - 66
Athinaikos BC (Greece)	-	(Spain) CB Feve San Jose	100 - 85
CB Feve San Jose (Spain)	-	(Croatia) Ragusa Dubrovnik	71 - 66
Athinaikos BC (Greece)	-	(Greece) Panionios G.S.S.	73 - 56
Panionios G.S.S. (Greece)	-	(Spain) CB Feve San Jose	61 - 70
Ragusa Dubrovnik (Croatia)	-	(Greece) Athinaikos BC	61 - 81
Panionios G.S.S. (Greece)	-	(Croatia) Ragusa Dubrovnik	86 - 70
CB Feve San Jose (Spain)	-	(Greece) Athinaikos BC	90 - 67

Group E

	Team	Pld	W	L	PF	PA	Points
1.	(Spain) CB Feve San Jose	6	5	1	457	402	11
2.	(Greece) Athinaikos BC	6	5	1	467	410	11
3.	(Greece) Panionios G.S.S.	6	2	4	385	407	8
4.	(Croatia) Ragusa Dubrovnik	6	0	6	369	459	6

=== Group F ===
Home		Away	Score
K.V. Imperial AEL Limassol (Cyprus)	-	(Italy) Cras Basket Taranto	70 - 53
Croatia Gospić	-	(Spain) Gran Canaria	76 - 64
Gran Canaria (Spain)	-	(Cyprus) K.V. Imperial AEL Limassol	63 - 69
Cras Basket Taranto (Italy)	-	Croatia Gospić	71 - 58
K.V. Imperial AEL Limassol (Cyprus)	-	Croatia Gospić	65 - 67
Gran Canaria (Spain)	-	(Italy) Cras Basket Taranto	64 - 69
Cras Basket Taranto (Italy)	-	(Cyprus) K.V. Imperial AEL Limassol	77 - 60
Gran Canaria (Spain)	-	Croatia Gospić	66 - 63
K.V. Imperial AEL Limassol (Cyprus)	-	(Spain) Gran Canaria	71 - 59
Croatia Gospić	-	(Italy) Cras Basket Taranto	59 - 82
Croatia Gospić	-	(Cyprus) K.V. Imperial AEL Limassol	82 - 76
Cras Basket Taranto (Italy)	-	(Spain) Gran Canaria	81 - 79

Group F

	Team	Pld	W	L	PF	PA	Points
1.	(Italy) Cras Basket Taranto	6	5	1	433	390	11
2.	Croatia Gospić	6	3	3	405	424	9
3.	(Cyprus) K.V. Imperial AEL Limassol	6	3	3	411	401	9
4.	(Spain) Gran Canaria	6	1	5	395	429	7

=== Group G ===
Home		Away	Score
USO Mondeville (France)	-	(Greece) Aris Holargou	65 - 71
ZKK Buducnost Podgorica (Montenegro)	-	(Turkey) Galatasaray Istanbul	53 - 89
Aris Holargou (Greece)	-	(Montenegro) ZKK Buducnost Podgorica	82 - 71
Galatasaray Istanbul (Turkey)	-	(France) USO Mondeville	73 - 53
ZKK Buducnost Podgorica (Montenegro)	-	(France) USO Mondeville	64 - 77
Aris Holargou (Greece)	-	(Turkey) Galatasaray Istanbul	61 - 65
Galatasaray Istanbul (Turkey)	-	(Montenegro) ZKK Buducnost Podgorica	85 - 57
Aris Holargou (Greece)	-	(France) USO Mondeville	53 - 59
USO Mondeville (France)	-	(Turkey) Galatasaray Istanbul	61 - 79
ZKK Buducnost Podgorica (Montenegro)	-	(Greece) Aris Holargou	84 - 70
USO Mondeville (France)	-	(Montenegro) ZKK Buducnost Podgorica	86 - 68
Galatasaray Istanbul (Turkey)	-	(Greece) Aris Holargou	97 - 45

Group G

	Team	Pld	W	L	PF	PA	Points
1.	(Turkey) Galatasaray Istanbul	6	6	0	488	330	12
2.	(France) USO Mondeville	6	3	3	401	408	9
3.	(Greece) Aris Holargou	6	2	4	382	441	8
4.	(Montenegro) ZKK Buducnost Podgorica	6	1	5	397	489	7

=== Group H ===
Home		Away	Score
BC ICIM Arad (Romania)	-	(Spain) Ibiza - PDV	61 - 66
Kara Trutnov (Czech Republic)	-	(Lithuania) Arvi Marijampole	79 - 73
Arvi Marijampole (Lithuania)	-	(Romania) BC ICIM Arad	84 - 65
Ibiza - PDV (Spain)	-	(Czech Republic) Kara Trutnov	91 - 62
BC ICIM Arad (Romania)	-	(Czech Republic) Kara Trutnov	88 - 90
Arvi Marijampole (Lithuania)	-	(Spain) Ibiza - PDV	57 - 62
Ibiza - PDV (Spain)	-	(Romania) BC ICIM Arad	95 - 68
Arvi Marijampole (Lithuania)	-	(Czech Republic) Kara Trutnov	52 - 60
BC ICIM Arad (Romania)	-	(Lithuania) Arvi Marijampole	79 - 57
Kara Trutnov (Czech Republic)	-	(Spain) Ibiza - PDV	71 - 83
Kara Trutnov (Czech Republic)	-	(Romania) BC ICIM Arad	81 - 90
Ibiza - PDV (Spain)	-	(Lithuania) Arvi Marijampole	67 - 61

Group H

	Team	Pld	W	L	PF	PA	Points
1.	(Spain) Ibiza - PDV	6	6	0	464	380	12
2.	(Czech Republic) Kara Trutnov	6	3	3	443	477	9
3.	(Romania) BC ICIM Arad	6	2	4	451	473	8
4.	(Lithuania) Arvi Marijampole	6	1	5	384	412	7

=== Group I ===
Home		Away	Score
Lavezzini Parma (Italy)	-	(Latvia) SK Cesis	79 - 43
KK Zeljeznicar Sarajevo (Bosnia and Herzegovina)	-	(Greece) Ravenna Esperides	53 - 56
SK Cesis (Latvia)	-	(Bosnia and Herzegovina) KK Zeljeznicar Sarajevo	88 - 66
Ravenna Esperides (Greece)	-	(Italy) Lavezzini Parma	69 - 64
KK Zeljeznicar Sarajevo (Bosnia and Herzegovina)	-	(Italy) Lavezzini Parma	71 - 88
SK Cesis (Latvia)	-	(Greece) Ravenna Esperides	58 - 56
Ravenna Esperides (Greece)	-	(Bosnia and Herzegovina) KK Zeljeznicar Sarajevo	94 - 51
SK Cesis (Latvia)	-	(Italy) Lavezzini Parma	64 - 72
Lavezzini Parma (Italy)	-	(Greece) Ravenna Esperides	78 - 68
KK Zeljeznicar Sarajevo (Bosnia and Herzegovina)	-	(Latvia) SK Cesis	63 - 84
Lavezzini Parma (Italy)	-	(Bosnia and Herzegovina) KK Zeljeznicar Sarajevo	86 - 50
Ravenna Esperides (Greece)	-	(Latvia) SK Cesis	67 - 56

Group I

	Team	Pld	W	L	PF	PA	Points
1.	(Italy) Lavezzini Parma	6	5	1	467	365	11
2.	(Greece) Ravenna Esperides	6	4	2	410	360	10
3.	(Latvia) SK Cesis	6	3	3	393	403	9
4.	(Bosnia and Herzegovina) KK Zeljeznicar Sarajevo	6	0	6	354	496	6

=== Group J ===
Home		Away	Score
Olivais Coimbra (Portugal)	-	(France) Tarbes GB	59 - 102
Extrugasa Cortegada (Spain)	-	(Italy) Pallacanestro Ribera	81 - 67
Tarbes GB (France)	-	(Spain) Extrugasa Cortegada	83 - 52
Pallacanestro Ribera (Italy)	-	(Portugal) Olivais Coimbra	75 - 59
Olivais Coimbra (Portugal)	-	(Italy) Extrugasa Cortegada	74 - 72
Pallacanestro Ribera (Italy)	-	(France) Tarbes GB	64 - 65
Tarbes GB (France)	-	(Portugal) Olivais Coimbra	88 - 78
Pallacanestro Ribera (Italy)	-	(Spain) Extrugasa Cortegada	66 - 80
Extrugasa Cortegada (Spain)	-	(France) Tarbes GB	51 - 56
Olivais Coimbra (Portugal)	-	(Italy) Pallacanestro Ribera	80 - 63
Tarbes GB (France)	-	(Italy) Pallacanestro Ribera	66 - 55
Extrugasa Cortegada (Spain)	-	(Portugal) Olivais Coimbra	65 - 66

Group J

	Team	Pld	W	L	PF	PA	Points
1.	(France) Tarbes GB	6	6	0	460	359	12
2.	(Portugal) Olivais Coimbra	6	3	3	416	465	9
3.	(Spain) Extrugasa Cortegada	6	2	4	401	412	8
4.	(Italy) Pallacanestro Ribera	6	1	5	390	431	7

== Sixteenth-Finals ==
Team #1	Agg.	Team #2	1st leg	2nd leg
Dynamo Moscow (Russia)	164-115	(Sweden) Solna Vikings	75 - 58	89 - 57
Galatasaray Istanbul (Turkey)	171-133	(Romania) Municipal Târgoviste	96 - 67	75 - 66
Szeviép Szeged (Hungary)	111-117	(Greece) Panionios G.S.S.	52 - 53	59 - 64
Tarbes GB (France)	206-110	(Romania) BC ICIM Arad	110 - 58	96 - 52
Ibiza - PDV (Spain)	159-122	(Spain) Extrugasa Cortegada	79 - 61	80 - 61
Elitzur Ramla (Israel)	144-122	(Portugal) Olivais Coimbra	77 - 60	67 - 62
Chevakata Vologda (Russia)	152-149	(Switzerland) Universite BC Neuchatel	70 - 84	82 - 65
Dexia W Namur (Belgium)	167-141	(Czech Republic) Kara Trutnov	84 - 72	83 - 69
ŽKK Hemofarm (Serbia)	165-144	(Russia) Spartak M.R. Noginsk	73 - 57	92 - 87
Lavezzini Parma (Italy)	137-126	Croatia Gospić	55 - 60	82 - 66
Athinaikos BC (Greece)	158-129	(Latvia) SK Cesis	68 - 57	90 - 72
CB Feve San Jose (Spain)	146-135	(Turkey) Botasspor Adana	65 - 67	81 - 68
Cras Basket Taranto (Italy)	151-126	(Romania) CSS-LMK Sfântu Gheorghe	71 - 66	80 - 60
Dynamo Kursk (Russia)	140-99	(France) USO Mondeville	68 - 48	72 - 51
Rivas Ecopolis Madrid (Spain)	128-141	(Cyprus) K.V. Imperial AEL Limassol	58 - 62	70 - 79
Ravenna Esperides (Greece)	128-113	(France) Challes-les-Eaux Basket	77 - 62	51 - 51

== Eight-Finals ==
Team #1	Agg.	Team #2	1st leg	2nd leg
Dynamo Moscow (Russia)	135-126	(Greece) Ravenna Esperides	75 - 74	60 - 52
Galatasaray Istanbul (Turkey)	135-131	(Cyprus) K.V. Imperial AEL Limassol	61 - 63	74 - 68
Dynamo Kursk (Russia)	148-107	(Greece) Panionios G.S.S.	64 - 53	84 - 54
Tarbes GB (France)	135-148	(Italy) Cras Basket Taranto	66 - 75	69 - 73
Ibiza - PDV (Spain)	126-132	(Spain) CB Feve San Jose	56 - 60	70 - 72
Elitzur Ramla (Israel)	145-179	(Greece) Athinaikos BC	73 - 88	72 - 91
Chevakata Vologda (Russia)	169-135	(Italy) Lavezzini Parma	81 - 63	88 - 72
Dexia W Namur (Belgium)	135-147	(Serbia) ŽKK Hemofarm	56 - 77	79 - 70

== Quarter-finals ==
Team #1	Agg.	Team #2	1st leg	2nd leg
Dynamo Moscow (Russia)	163-128	(Serbia) ŽKK Hemofarm	90 - 63	73 - 65
Galatasaray Istanbul (Turkey)	134-114	(Russia) Chevakata Vologda	79 - 65	55 - 49
Dynamo Kursk (Russia)	146-141	(Greece) Athinaikos BC	77 - 52	69 - 89
CB Feve San Jose (Spain)	106-126	(Italy) Cras Basket Taranto	43 - 66	63 - 60

== Semi-finals ==
Team #1	Agg.	Team #2	1st leg	2nd leg
Dynamo Moscow (Russia)	146-161	(Italy) Cras Basket Taranto	71 - 76	75 - 85
Galatasaray Istanbul (Turkey)	109-100	(Russia) Dynamo Kursk	47 - 61	62 - 39

== Final ==
Team #1	Agg.	Team #2	1st leg	2nd leg
Galatasaray Istanbul (Turkey)	137-128	(Italy) Cras Basket Taranto	55 - 67	82 - 61
