= David Henderson (basketball) =

American basketball player and coach

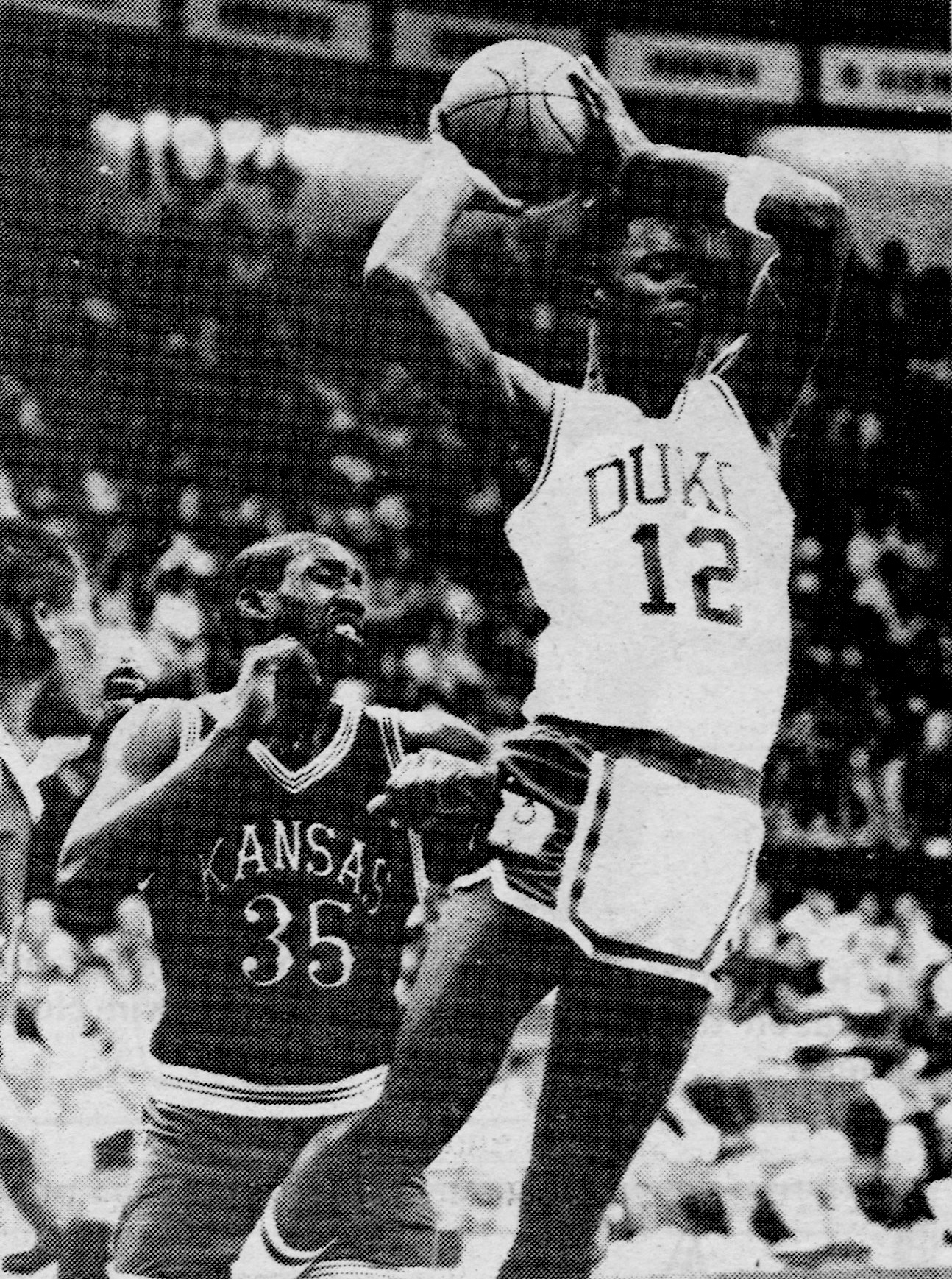
- Henderson (right) in the 1986 Final Four

Personal information
- Born: July 21, 1964 (age 62) Henderson, North Carolina, U.S.
- Listed height: 6 ft 5 in (1.96 m)
- Listed weight: 195 lb (88 kg)

Career information
- High school: Warren County (Warrenton, North Carolina)
- College: Duke (1982–1986)
- NBA draft: 1986: 3rd round, 58th overall pick
- Drafted by: Washington Bullets
- Playing career: 1986–1998
- Position: Shooting guard
- Number: 3
- Coaching career: 1996–2006

Career history

Playing
- 1986–1987: Albany Patroons
- 1988: Philadelphia 76ers
- 1988–1989: Dijon, France
- 1990–1991: Hapoel Tel Aviv
- 1990–1991: Quad City Thunder
- 1991–1992: Maccabi Rishon LeZion
- 1992–1994: Hapoel Holon
- 1994–1995: Galatasaray
- 1995–1996: Ironi Ramat Gan
- 1998: Blonay

Coaching
- 1997–2000: Duke (assistant)
- 2000–2006: Delaware

Career highlights
- Israeli Basketball Premier League MVP (1991)
- Stats at NBA.com
- Stats at Basketball Reference

David McKinley Henderson (born July 21, 1964) is an amateur basketball scout for the NBA's Cleveland Cavaliers.

As a basketball player, Henderson was senior co-captain of the Duke Blue Devil 1986 team that reached the NCAA Final Four.

After graduating from Duke, Henderson played professional basketball for 10 years in the United States, Israel, France, and Turkey.

After retirement from playing basketball, Henderson worked for three years as an assistant men's basketball coach for Duke, followed by a six-year stint as head men's basketball coach at the University of Delaware. He has been a scout for the Cavaliers since 2006.

== College career ==
Henderson grew up in Drewry, North Carolina. After graduating from Warren County High School in 1982, Henderson was recruited by Mike Krzyzewski to play for Duke. Henderson was either a starter or 6th man throughout his college career. As a senior co-captain, Henderson started all 39 games, averaging 14.2 points per game, and helped lead the Blue Devils to the national championship game, which they lost to Louisville.

Henderson graduated from Duke with a degree in economics in 1986.

== Professional career ==
After graduation from Duke, Henderson played professional basketball for 10 years.

Initially drafted by the Washington Bullets in the third round of the 1986 NBA draft, Henderson spent his first year playing for the Albany Patroons in the Continental Basketball Association. During his 22 games playing for the NBA's Philadelphia 76ers during the 1987–88 season, Henderson averaged 5.7 points per game.

Henderson spent the following 8 years playing basketball professionally in France, Israel, and Turkey. In 1991, he was named Israeli Basketball Premier League MVP.

== Coaching career ==
After retiring as a player, Henderson was hired as an assistant coach at Duke in 1997. The Blue Devils won the ACC championship during each of his 3 seasons as an assistant coach, finishing national runner up in 1999.

In 2000, Henderson was hired as head men's basketball coach at the University of Delaware. In so doing, he replaced another former Duke assistant coach, Mike Brey, who had been selected to become the head coach at Notre Dame.

Henderson served a total of six years as head coach at Delaware. In his first season, the Blue Hens lost in the America East title game, finishing the year with a 20–10 record. After his first season, Delaware moved into a more competitive (and better funded) athletic conference, the Colonial Athletic Association. The team made the tournament semifinals the next two years, and the quarterfinals during his 4th year with the team. After consecutive losing seasons, however, Henderson was fired after the 2005–06 season.

== Scouting career ==
Henderson was hired to be a scout by the NBA's Cleveland Cavaliers in the summer of 2006. As of 2022, he continues to scout amateur players for the Cavaliers. During his time with Cleveland, he has participated in all of their annual player drafts and won an NBA championship ring in 2015.

== Career statistics ==
Legend
| GP | Games played | GS | Games started | MPG | Minutes per game |
| FG% | Field goal percentage | 3P% | 3-point field goal percentage | FT% | Free throw percentage |
| RPG | Rebounds per game | APG | Assists per game | SPG | Steals per game |
| BPG | Blocks per game | PPG | Points per game | **Bold** | Career high |

=== NBA ===
==== Regular season ====
| Year | Team | GP | GS | MPG | FG% | 3P% | FT% | RPG | APG | SPG | BPG | PPG |
|---|---|---|---|---|---|---|---|---|---|---|---|---|
| 1987–88 | Philadelphia | 22 | 1 | 16.0 | .405 | .000 | .681 | 1.6 | 1.5 | .5 | .2 | 5.7 |
