= Simona Šoda =

Croatian basketball player

ŽKK Ragusa
- Title: Head coach

Personal information
- Born: October 24, 1974 (age 52) Šibenik, Croatia
- Listed height: 186 cm (6 ft 1 in)

Career information
- Playing career: 1987–2010
- Position: Small forward / power forward
- Coaching career: 2010–present

Career history

Playing
- 1987-1992: ŽKK Šibenik
- 1992-1994: ŽKK Zadar
- 1994-1995: Centar Banka Zagreb
- 1995-1998: Mursa Osijek
- 1998-2000: Hrvatski Dragovoljac Zagreb
- 2000: Sirela Livno
- 2000-2001: ŽKK Gospić
- 2001-2003: Good Angels Košice
- 2003-2004: ŽKK Plamen Požega
- 2004-2005: Ragusa Dubrovnik
- 2005-2006: Riva Basket
- 2006-2009: Elfic Fribourg
- 2009-2010: Helios Basket

Coaching
- 2010-2017: Académie Fribourg Olympic
- 2018-2019: Zürich Lady Wildcats U23
- 2019-2020: STV Luzern
- 2020-2022: Helios VS Basket
- 2023-2024: ASVEL Féminin Lyon
- 2024-present: ŽKK Ragusa

Simona Šoda (born October 24, 1974) is a Croatian basketball coach and former player. During her playing career, she was a member of the Croatia national team. She began her coaching career in 2010 as an assistant with Académie Fribourg.

In 2024, she was hired as the head coach of ŽKK Ragusa.
