= 2017–2018 Icelandic Women's Basketball Cup =

2017–2018 Bikarkeppni Kvenna
Tournament details
- Arena: Laugardalshöll; Reykjavík
- Dates: 10–13 January 2018

Final positions
- Champions: Keflavík
- Runners-up: Njarðvík

Awards and statistics
- MVP: (United States) Brittanny Dinkins
- Top scorer(s): (United States) Shalonda R. Winton

The 2017–2018 Bikarkeppni kvenna was the 44th edition of the Icelandic Women's Basketball Cup, won by Keflavík against Njarðvík. The competition is managed by the Icelandic Basketball Federation and the final four was held in Reykjavík, in the Laugardalshöll in January 2018. Brittanny Dinkins was named the Cup Finals MVP after turning in 16 points, 11 rebounds, 8 assists and 5 steals.

== Participating teams ==
Thirteen teams signed up for the Cup tournament.

== Bracket ==
Quarterfinals
10 December
Keflavík	99
KR	79
10 December
Snæfell	75
Valur	73
10 December
Skallagrímur	92
ÍR	47
10 December
Njarðvík	77
Breiðablik	74

Semifinals
11 January
Keflavík	83
Snæfell	81
11 January
Skallagrímur	75
Njarðvík	78

Final
13 January
Keflavík	74
Njarðvík	63

== Cup Finals MVP ==
Pos.	Player	Team
PG	(United States) Brittanny Dinkins	Keflavík
