= Swiss Women's Basketball Championship =

- Organising body: Swiss Basketball
- Founded: 1940
- First season: 1940-41
- Country: Switzerland
- Confederation: FIBA Europe
- Number of teams: 9
- Level on pyramid: 1
- Relegation to: NLB Women
- Domestic cup: Swiss Cup
- Supercup: Swiss Super Cup
- Current champions: Nyon Basket Feminin
- Website: swiss.basketball
- 2024–25 Swiss Women's Basketball Championship

The Swiss Women's Basketball Championship, or SB League Women or Swiss League Women, is the highest tier level of women's professional club basketball competition in Switzerland. The league is also sometimes referred to as National League A (NLA or LNA). Currently the SB League Women is granted one spot in the FIBA EuroCup Women.

== History ==
The 2019–20 season ended prematurely due to the coronavirus pandemic in Switzerland and in March 2020 the Swiss Basketball Executive Committee announced that no team would be awarded the national championship title.

== Current teams (2024-25) ==
The following teams participate in the women's SB league as of the 2024-25 season:

- BCF Elfic Fribourg Basket
- Nyon Basket Feminin
- BBC Troistorrents
- Baden Basket 54
- Geneve LPLO
- Helios VS Basket
- BC Alte Kanti Aarau
- Esperance Sportive Pully
- Mari Group Riva Basket

== Champions ==
Season	Champion
1940–41	Chêne Genève
1941–42	Chêne Genève
1942–43	SP Lugano
1943–44	Sanas Merry Boys Lausanne
1944–45	Servette Genève
1945–46	Sico Sport Locarno
1946–47	Sico Sport Locarno
1947–48	Sico Sport Locarno
1948–49	Sanas Merry Boys Lausanne
1949–50	Sico Sport Locarno
1950–51	Servette Genève
1951–52	Servette Genève
1952–53	Servette Genève
1953–54	Chêne Genève
1954–55	Servette Genève
1955–56	Servette Genève
1956–57	Chêne Genève
1957–58	Chêne Genève
1958–59	Chêne Genève
1959–60	Chêne Genève
1960–61	Chêne Genève
1961–62	BC Fémina Bern
1962–63	Chêne Genève
1963–64	Chêne Genève
1964–65	Fribourg Olympic
1965–66	BC Fémina Bern
1966–67	Riri Mendrisio
1967–68	Riri Mendrisio
1968–69	Riri Mendrisio
1969–70	Stade Français Genève
1970–71	Riri Mendrisio
1971–72	Stade Français Genève
1972–73	Nyon Basket
1973–74	Stade Français Genève
1974–75	BC Fémina Bern
1975–76	SP Muraltese
1976–77	Stade Français Genève
1977–78	Stade Français Genève
1978–79	Nyon Basket
1979–80	Stade Français Genève
1980–81	CVJM Birsfelden
1981–82	CVJM Birsfelden
1982–83	STV Luzern Basket
1983–84	Nyon Basket
1984–85	Espérance Sportive Pully
1985–86	Espérance Sportive Pully
1986–87	CVJM Birsfelden
1987–88	CVJM Birsfelden
1988–89	CVJM Birsfelden
1989–90	Fémina Lausanne
1990–91	Fémina Lausanne
1991–92	Pall. Femminile Bellinzona
1992–93	Pall. Femminile Bellinzona
1993–94	Pall. Femminile Bellinzona
1994–95	Pall. Femminile Bellinzona
1995–96	Pall. Femminile Bellinzona
1996–97	BBC Les Portes du Soleil Troistorrents
1997–98	Pall. Femminile Bellinzona
1998–99	BBC Troistorrents-Morgins
1999–00	Valtemporaire Martigny
2000–01	Valtemporaire Martigny
2001–02	Valtemporaire Martigny
2002–03	BBC Troistorrents-Morgins
2003–04	Martigny Basket
2004–05	Martigny Basket
2005–06	Elfic Fribourg Basket
2006–07	Universite BC Neuchatel
2007–08	Canti Riva Basket Ceresio
2008–09	Sdent Sierre Basket
2009–10	Sdent Sierre Basket
2010–11	BCF Elfic Fribourg Basket
2011–12	Sdent Helios VS Basket
2012–13	Helios VS Basket
2013–14	Helios VS Basket
2014–15	Helios VS Basket
2015–16	Helios VS Basket
2016–17	Helios VS Basket
2017–18	BCF Elfic Fribourg
2018–19	BCF Elfic Fribourg
2019–20	No title awarded due to pandemic.
2020–21	BCF Elfic Fribourg
2021–22	BCF Elfic Fribourg
2022–23	BCF Elfic Fribourg
2023–24	BCF Elfic Fribourg
2024–25	Nyon Basket Féminin

- Source
