= ŽKK Mursa =

KK Mursa
- Leagues: Croatian second league
- Founded: 1975
- Arena: Jug Sport Hall (ŠD Jug, capacity: 1250)
- Location: Osijek, Croatia
- Head coach: Goran Gunjević

KK Mursa is Croatian women's basketball club in Osijek.

== Notable former players ==
- Sena Pavetić
- Davorka Balić
- Ana Božić
- Simona Šoda
