= Gianluca Barilari =

Basketball Coach

Personal information
- Born: 14 February 1964 (age 62)
- Position: Head coach
- Coaching career: 1997–present

Career history

Coaching
- Lugano Tigers
- Bellinzona
- 2017–2021: Switzerland

Gianluca Barilari (born 14 February 1964) is a Swiss professional basketball coach. He was head coach of the Switzerland national team from 2017 to 2021. Before 2017, Barilari coached club teams in Italy, Turkey and Switzerland. He also coached several of Switzerland’s youth national basketball teams.
