= Ana Božić =

Croatian basketball player

Personal information
- Born: 25 February 1988 (age 38) Slavonski Brod, SFR Yugoslavia
- Listed height: 1.76 m (5 ft 9 in)

Career information
- WNBA draft: 2009: undrafted
- Position: Point guard

Career history
- Požega
- Mursa
- Rogaška
- Brod na Savi
- –2015: Pleter
- 2015–2016: Almore Genova

Ana Božić (born 25 February 1988 in Slavonski Brod, SFR Yugoslavia) is a Croatian basketball player.
