= Davorka Balić =

Croatian basketball player

No. 77 – AD Cortegada
- Position: Power forward
- League: Second League of Spain

Personal information
- Born: 7 January 1988 (age 38) Osijek, SFR Yugoslavia
- Listed height: 1.88 m (6 ft 2 in)

Career information
- WNBA draft: 2010: undrafted
- Playing career: 2005–present

Career history
- 2005–2009: Mursa
- 2009–2011: Šibenik Jolly JBS
- 2012–2013: Zadar
- 2013: Split
- 2014: Le Havre
- 2014–2015: Alviks Basket
- 2015–2016: ADBA
- 2016–present: AD Cortegada

Davorka Balić (born 7 January 1988 in Osijek, SFR Yugoslavia) is a Croatian female basketball player.
