= Brunnen Basket =

- Leagues: Swiss 1 National Liga; NLB Women
- Location: Brunnen, Switzerland
- Team colors: black, white
- Championships: 1 Swiss Cup Women: 2006
- Website: brunnen-basket.ch

Brunnen Basket was a Swiss basketball club based in Brunnen, Switzerland. Brunnen Basket's women's team plays in the Swiss 1 National Liga, the third-highest tier level of women's professional basketball in Switzerland. The team withdrew from professional competition in 2010.

== History ==
In 2006, Brunnen Basket won the Swiss Cup Women championship, defeating Fribourg 66-62.

Among former Brunnen Basket players was 2018 Stony Brook University Athletic Hall of Fame inductee Jessica Smith. Smith was a 4x All-America East Conference selection, 1x All-Defense, 1x All-Freshmen, and 2004 America East Rookie of the Year at Stony Brook. She played professionally for Brunnen Basket. Smith opened her professional career with Brunnen with a 33 point game.
