= BC Arlesheim =

- Leagues: NLB Women; NL1M
- Location: Arlesheim, Switzerland
- Team colors: navy, white
- Website: bca.bvn.ch

BC Arlesheim is a Swiss basketball club based in Arlesheim, Switzerland. BC Arlesheim‘s women's team plays in NLB Women, the second-highest tier level of women's professional basketball in Switzerland. The men's team plays in NL1M, the third tier of men's basketball in Switzerland.

== History ==
Based in Arlesheim, Switzerland, the BC Arlesheim club was founded in 1976 and is one of the biggest basketball clubs in northwestern Switzerland.

In the NLB women, BC Arlesheim has yet to win a league title, finishing 5th in 2023, 7th in 2024, 8th in 2025, and 8th in 2026.
