= Sena Pavetić =

Croatian basketball player

Personal information
- Born: 12 January 1986 (age 40) Osijek, SFR Yugoslavia
- Listed height: 1.98 m (6 ft 6 in)

Career information
- WNBA draft: 2008: undrafted
- Playing career: 2001–2014
- Position: Center

Career history
- 2001–2004: Mursa
- 2004–2005: Zala Volán ZTE
- 2005–2006: CJM Bourges Basket
- 2006–2007: Cavigal Nice Basket
- 2008–2009: CDB Zaragoza
- 2009–2010: Libertas Trogylos Basket
- 2011–2012: Gospić
- 2012–2013: Novi Zagreb
- 2013–2014: AE Sedis Bàsquet
- 2014: Brno
Medals
Women's basketball
Representing Croatia
Mediterranean Games
Bronze medal – third place	2009 Pescara	Team

Sena Pavetić (born 12 January 1986 in Osijek, SFR Yugoslavia) is a former Croatian female basketball player.
