= Pallacanestro Bellinzona =

- Leagues: NLB Women
- Location: Bellinzona, Switzerland
- Team colors: purple, white
- Championships: 1 NLB Women: 2012; 6 Swiss Cup Women: 1992, 1993, 1994, 1995, 1997, 1998

Pallacanestro Bellinzona (in English: Bellinzona Basket) is a Swiss professional basketball team of Bellinzona, in the canton of Ticino. The club plays its home games at the indoor stadium of Bellinzona that has a capacity of about 4,000 spectators. The women's team currently plays in the Swiss NLB Women, the second-tier of women's professional basketball in Switzerland. The team also went by the names Sopraceneri Bellinzona and Metanord Bellinzona prior to its current name.

== History ==
The team enjoyed its glory days in the mid-90s when under the leadership of Joe Whelton won three consecutive national championships and four consecutive Swiss Cups.

Bellinzone won the Swiss Cup Women championship in 1992, 1993, 1994, 1995, 1997, and 1998. Belinzona has been finalists in the Swiss Cup Women in 1996, 2000, and 2018.

== Titles and achievements ==
Swiss League

- Winners (3): 1992-93, 1993–94, 1994–95

Swiss Cup

- Winners (4): 1992-93, 1993–94, 1994–95, 1995-96

== Notable coaches ==
To appear in this section a player must have either:

- Won an award or title as head coach of a professional team
- Coached a national team

- (Switzerland) Gianluca Barilari
- (Croatia) Matan Rimac
