= Adam Mirković =

Serbian basketball player

No. 12 – BC Timișoara
- Position: Forward
- League: Liga Națională

Personal information
- Born: November 13, 1991 (age 35) Belgrade, SR Serbia, SFR Yugoslavia
- Listed height: 1.99 m (6 ft 6 in)
- Listed weight: 90 kg (198 lb)

Career information
- Playing career: 2007–present

Career history
- 2007–2011: Radnički 034
- 2011–2015: Jagodina
- 2015: Alte Kanti Aarau
- 2015–2016: Garonne ASPTT Basket
- 2016–2017: Tamiš
- 2017: Feni Industries
- 2017–2018: Kakanj
- 2018–2019: Ulcinj
- 2019–present: Timișoara

Adam Mirković (born November 13, 1991) is a Serbian professional basketball player for BC Timișoara.
