= Elfic Fribourg Generation =

- Leagues: NLB Women
- Location: Fribourg, Switzerland
- Team colors: blue, white
- Championships: 2 NLB Women: 2013, 2017

Elfic Fribourg Generation is a Swiss women's basketball club based in Fribourg, Switzerland. Elfic Fribourg Generation plays in NLB Women, the second-highest tier level of women's professional basketball in Switzerland. The team is coached by Thibault Allemann. The team is the second-tier team of Elfic Fribourg, which plays in the highest tier level in Switzerland.
