= Villars Basket =

- Leagues: NLB Women; NLB
- Location: Villars-sur-Glâne, Switzerland
- Team colors: blue, white
- Championships: 1 NLB: 2018
- Website: www.villars-basket.ch/fr

Villars Basket is a Swiss basketball club based in Villars-sur-Glâne, Switzerland. Villars Basket has a women's and men's team. The women's team plays in NLB Women, the second-highest tier level of women's professional basketball in Switzerland. The men's team plays in the NLB, the second-tier level professional basketball league in Switzerland.

== History ==
The men's Villars Basket team were Swiss NLB champions in 2018. After a 15-5 regular season (second best record in the NLB), Villars defeated BBC Nyon 3-2 to win the 2018 title. Troran Brown of Villars was named 2018 Finals MVP. Brown graduated from Montevallo University in 2015 after a three-year career playing basketball there at the NCAA Division II level.

The men's team was also NLB finalists in 2024, semifinalists in 2019 and 2022, and regular season champions in 2020 and 2024.

The women's Villars Basket team plays in the Swiss NLB Women league. The Villars women have never won a NLB championship. The women's team was NLB semifinalists in 2024.
