= Helios VS Basket =

- Leagues: SB League Women
- Founded: 1973
- Arena: Salle du College des Creusets (2,000)
- Location: Vetroz, Switzerland
- Team colors: black, orange
- Championships: 6 SB League Women: 2012, 2013, 2014, 2015, 2016, 2017; 5 Swiss Cup Women: 2011, 2012, 2013, 2014, 2015; 2 NLB Women: 2003, 2021
- Website: helios-basket.ch

Helios VS Basket, commonly known as Helios Basket, is a Swiss women's professional basketball club based in Vetroz, Switzerland. Helios Basket plays in SB League Women, the highest tier level of women's professional basketball in Switzerland.

The team plays its games at the Salle du College des Creusets. The club's second-tier team has been known as Helios VS Basket Espoirs (prospects).

== Notable players ==
- (United States) Brittanny Dinkins
- (Greece) Anna Niki Stamolamprou
- (Venezuela) Maria Villarroel
- (Croatia) Simona Šoda
