= Blonay Basket =

- Leagues: NLB Women
- Location: Blonay, Switzerland
- Team colors: red, yellow
- Championships: 2 NLB Women: 2024, 2025

Blonay Basket is a Swiss women's basketball club based in Blonay, Switzerland. Blonay Basket plays in NLB Women, the second-highest tier level of women's professional basketball in Switzerland. The team is coached by Derek Winston.
