= BBC Troistorrents =

- Leagues: SB League Women
- Location: Troistorrents, Switzerland
- Team colors: orange, blue
- Championships: 3 SB League Women: 1997, 1999, 2003; 1 NLB Women: 2016; 2 Swiss Cup Women: 2003, 2004
- Website: bbctroistorrents.ch

BBC Les Portes du Soleil Troistorrents, commonly known as BBC Troistorrents, is a Swiss women's basketball club based in Troistorrents, Switzerland. The BBC Troistorrents play in SB League Women, the highest tier level of women's professional basketball in Switzerland. The Troistorrents are currently coached by Emilie Duvivier.
