= Elfic Fribourg =

- Leagues: SB League Women
- Founded: 2003
- Arena: Saint-Léonard Hall
- Location: Fribourg, Switzerland
- Team colors: blue, white
- Championships: 8 Swiss League Women: 2006, 2011, 2018, 2019, 2021, 2022, 2023, 2024; 5 Swiss Cup Women: 2018, 2021, 2022, 2023, 2024
- Website: elficfribourg.ch

Basketball Club Féminin Elfic Fribourg, commonly known as Elfic Fribourg, is a Swiss women's professional basketball club based in the city of Fribourg. As of 2024, it has won the Swiss national championship eight times. The club was founded in June 2003 with the merger of BBC City-Fribourg and the women's team of ASB Villars.

Elfic Fribourg Generation is the team's second-tier club that plays in NLB Women, the second-highest tier of women's professional basketball in Switzerland.

== Notable players ==
- (Canada) Aislinn Konig
- (Iceland) Danielle Rodriguez
- (United States) Britney Jones
- (Venezuela) Maria Villarroel
- (Croatia) Simona Šoda
