= Esperance Sportive Pully =

- Leagues: SB League Women
- Location: Lausanne, Switzerland
- Team colors: white, green
- Championships: 2 SB League Women: 1985, 1986; 2 Swiss Cup Women: 1985, 1986

Esperance Sportive Pully is a Swiss women's basketball club based in Lausanne, Switzerland. Esperance Sportive Pully plays in SB League Women, the highest tier level of women's professional basketball in Switzerland. Esperance Sportive Pully is currently coached by Tayyar Gungor.
