= Universite BC Neuchatel =

- Leagues: SB League Women
- Location: Neuchatel, Switzerland
- Team colors: blue, white
- Championships: 1 SB League Women: 2007; 2 Swiss Cup Women: 2008, 2009

Universite BC Neuchatel was a Swiss women's basketball club based in Neuchatel, Switzerland. Universite BC Neuchatel played in SB League Women, the highest tier level of women's professional basketball in Switzerland. Universite BC Neuchatel withdrew from the LNA after in 2009–10.
