= Mari Group Riva Basket =

- Leagues: SB League Women
- History: Ticinohosting.com Riva Basket (-2007); Canti Riva Basket Ceresio (2007-2012); Riva Basket (2012-); Fizzy Riva Muraltese (-2017); Mari Group Riva Basket (2017-)
- Location: Riva San Vitale, Switzerland
- Team colors: blue, light gray
- Championships: 1 SB League Women: 2008; 1 NLB Women: 2023; 1 Swiss Cup: 2016

Mari Group Riva Basket is a Swiss women's basketball club based in Riva San Vitale, Switzerland. Mari Group Riva Basket plays in SB League Women, the highest tier level of women's professional basketball in Switzerland. Mari Group Riva Basket is currently coached by Fabio Bassani. Prior to 2017, the team was known as Fizzy Riva Muraltese. In 2017, the team changed its name to Mari Group Riva Basket. The team was also known as Ticinohosting.com Riva Basket (-2007), Canti Riva Basket Ceresio (2007-2012), and Riva Basket (2012-) previously.

== History ==
In 2008, while playing as Canti Riva Basket Ceresio, Riva Basket won the SB League Women championship.

In 2016, while playing as Fizzy Riva Muraltese, Riva Basket won the Swiss Cup in the women's professional division. Riva was also runner-ups in the Swiss Cup in 2004 and 2012.

In 2023, Riva Basket won the NLB Women championship.
