= Martigny Basket =

- Leagues: SB League Women
- Location: Martigny, Switzerland
- Team colors: red, white
- Championships: 5 SB League Women; 2000, 2001, 2002, 2004, 2005; 4 Swiss Cup Women: 1999, 2000, 2001, 2005

Martigny Basket was a Swiss women's basketball club based in Martigny, Switzerland. Martigny Basket played in SB League Women, the highest tier level of women's professional basketball in Switzerland. Martigny Basket won the SB League Women championship in 2004 and 2005.
