= Nyon Basket Feminin =

- Leagues: SB League Women; FIBA EuroCup Women
- Arena: Centre Sportif Du Rocher
- Location: Nyon, Switzerland
- Team colors: blue, white
- Head coach: Loan Morand
- Championships: 4 SB League Women: 1973, 1979, 1984, 2025; 4 Swiss Cup Women: 1978, 1979, 1984, 2025; 2 Swiss NLB Women: 2018, 2019; 1 EWBL: 2025
- Website: nyonbasketfeminin.ch

Nyon Basket Feminin is a Swiss women's basketball club based in Nyon, Switzerland. Nyon Basket Feminin plays in SB League Women, the highest tier level of women's professional basketball in Switzerland. The team also plays in the EWBL. The team plays its games at the Centre Sportif Du Rocher. Nyon Basket Feminin is currently coached by Loan Morand.

== History ==
Nyon Basket Feminin has won three championships in SB League Women, in 1973, 1979, and 1984.

The team has also been champions of the Swiss NLB Women in 2018 and 2019 and won its first European championship as champions of the EWBL in 2025.

Nyon Basket has won the Patrick Baumann Swiss Cup four times (1978, 1979, 1984, 2025). The club fell short and lost in the Swiss Cup finals on six occasions (1975, 1977, 1983, 1988, 1990, 1991).

== Notable personnel ==
- (Netherlands) (Egypt) Hakim Salem, head coach from 2021 to 2023
