= BC Alte Kanti Aarau =

- Leagues: SB League Women; Swiss National Liga 1
- Location: Aarau, Switzerland
- Team colors: blue, white
- Championships: 1 NLB Women: 2015

BC Alte Kanti Aarau is a Swiss basketball club based in Aarau, Switzerland. The BC Alte Kanti Aarau women’s team plays in SB League Women the highest tier level of women's professional basketball in Switzerland. The men’s team plays in the Swiss National Liga 1. The BC Alte Kanti Aarau women’s team is currently coached by Eleni Kafantari.

== Notable players ==
- (Montenegro) Snežana Aleksić
- (Serbia) Adam Mirković
