= Sdent Sierre Basket =

- Leagues: SB League Women
- Location: Sierre, Switzerland
- Team colors: orange, yellow
- Championships: 2 SB League Women: 2009, 2010; 2 Swiss Cup Women: 2007, 2010
- Website: sierre-basket.ch

Sdent Sierre Basket was a Swiss women's basketball club based in Sierre, Switzerland. Sdent Sierre Basket played in SB League Women, the highest tier level of women's professional basketball in Switzerland. Sdent Sierre Basket left LNA after the 2010 season and its 2010 championship.
