= Stade Français Genève =

Swiss basketball club

Stade Français Genève is a Swiss basketball club part of the homonymous multi-sports club that is based in Geneva.

== History ==
The club was founded in 1942 and won its first Ligue Nationale A in 1951. The golden era of the club came one decade later when Stade Français won its second league title and managed to be one of the powerhouses of the Swiss League at least until the 1972–73 season (last trophy until today). The club still has six titles in the 1961-1973 era, it has only two participations in the FIBA European Champions Cup in the 1962–63 and 1971–72 seasons.

== Honours ==
- Swiss League

Winners (7): 1950–51, 1960–61, 1961–62, 1968–69, 1969–70, 1970–71, 1972–73

- Swiss Cup

Winners (1): 1961–62
