= Baden Basket 54 =

- Leagues: SB League Women
- Location: Baden, Switzerland
- Team colors: black, white
- Website: badenbasket.ch

Baden Basket 54 is a Swiss women's basketball club based in Baden, Switzerland. Baden Basket 54 plays in SB League Women, the highest tier level of women's professional basketball in Switzerland. Baden Basket 54 is currently coached by Stacey Nolan.
