= Geneve LPLO =

- Leagues: SB League Women
- History: Hope-Geneve II (-2014); Geneve Basket Releve (2014-); Geneve Basket Elite (-2023); Geneve Elite Basket (-2023); Geneve LPLO (2024-)
- Location: Geneva, Switzerland
- Team colors: black, white

Geneve LPLO is a Swiss women's basketball club based in Geneva, Switzerland. Geneve LPLO plays in SB League Women, the highest tier level of women's professional basketball in Switzerland. Geneve LPLO is currently coached by Romain Petit.
