= Swiss Basketball =

Governing body of basketball in Switzerland

- Predecessor: LNBA; FSB
- Merged into: Swiss Basketball (2016)
- Formation: 1929; 97 years ago
- Type: Basketball federation
- Location: Fribourg, Switzerland
- Members: FIBA
- Website: www.swissbasketball.ch

Swiss Basketball is the governing sports body of the top-tier level professional basketball leagues in Switzerland. Established in 1929, the organization has its headquarters in Fribourg. Swiss Basketball also manages the Swiss national teams, the Swiss Federation Cup, and the Swiss Youth Championships. Swiss Basketball currently has more than 17,000 members, from its nine regional associations, comprising 185 clubs.

Formerly, basketball in Switzerland was mainly governed by the Ligue Nationale de Basket (LNBA). In 2016, the LNBA merged with the Fédération Suisse de Basketball to form Swiss Basketball.

== See also ==
- Swiss Basketball League
- Swiss national basketball team
